= 2022–23 Brisbane Heat season =

Overview of Brisbane Heat in 2022–23

Brisbane Heat
2022–23 season
- Coach: Wade Seccombe
- Captain(s): Usman Khawaja; James Peirson (Acting)
- Home ground: The Gabba, Brisbane
- Leading Run Scorer: James Peirson (334)
- Leading Wicket Taker: Michael Neser (26)

The 2022–23 Brisbane Heat season was the twelfth in the club's history. Coached by Wade Seccombe and captained by Usman Khawaja, they competed in the 2022–23 season.

== The team ==
The Brisbane Heat are an Australian men's professional Twenty20 franchise cricket team that competes in the Big Bash League. The Heat wears a teal uniform and are based in Brisbane in the Australian state of Queensland. Their home ground is the Brisbane Cricket Ground, also known as The Gabba.

== Standings ==
Pos	Team	Pld	W	L	NR	Pts	NRR	Qualification
1	Perth Scorchers (C)	14	11	3	0	22	1.205	Advanced to play-off phase
2	Sydney Sixers	14	10	3	1	21	0.846	Advanced to play-off phase
3	Melbourne Renegades	14	7	7	0	14	−0.027	Advanced to play-off phase
4	Sydney Thunder	14	7	7	0	14	−0.716	Advanced to play-off phase
5	Brisbane Heat	14	6	7	1	13	−0.483	Advanced to play-off phase
6	Hobart Hurricanes	14	6	8	0	12	−0.340	
7	Adelaide Strikers	14	5	9	0	10	−0.151	
8	Melbourne Stars	14	3	11	0	6	−0.287	

Source: ESPNcricinfo
(C) Champions

== Current squad ==
The team's squad for the 2022–23 Big Bash League season as of 11 December 2022.

- Players with international caps are listed in **bold**
- Ages are given as of the opening match of the tournament, 15 December 2022

No.	Name	Nationality	Date of birth	Batting style	Bowling style	Notes
Batters
70	**Sam Billings**	England	15 June 1991 (aged 31)	Right-handed	—	Overseas player & International Cap, Wicketkeeper-batter
17	Max Bryant	Australia	10 March 1999 (aged 23)	Right-handed	Right-arm medium	
61	Sam Hain	England	16 July 1995 (aged 27)	Right-handed	Right-arm off break	Overseas player
5	**Sam Heazlett**	Australia	12 September 1995 (aged 27)	Left-handed	Slow left arm orthodox	
18	**Usman Khawaja**	Australia	18 December 1986 (aged 35)	Left-handed	Right-arm medium	International Cap
33	**Marnus Labuschagne**	Australia	22 June 1994 (aged 28)	Right-handed	Right-arm leg break	International Cap
82	**Colin Munro**	New Zealand	11 March 1987 (aged 35)	Left-handed	Right-arm medium-fast	Overseas player & International Cap
77	**Matt Renshaw**	Australia	28 March 1996 (aged 26)	Left-handed	Right-arm off break	International Cap
44	Ross Whiteley	England	28 March 1996 (aged 26)	Left-handed	Left-arm medium	Overseas player
All-rounders
7	James Bazley	Australia	8 April 1995 (aged 27)	Right-handed	Right-arm fast-medium	
24	**Jack Wildermuth**	Australia	1 September 1993 (aged 29)	Right-handed	Right-arm medium-fast	International Cap
Wicket-Keepers
59	James Peirson	Australia	13 October 1992 (aged 30)	Right-handed	—	
Spin Bowlers
30	**Matthew Kuhnemann**	Australia	20 July 1996 (aged 26)	Left-handed	Slow left arm orthodox	International Cap
4	**Mitchell Swepson**	Australia	4 October 1993 (aged 29)	Right-handed	Right-arm leg break	International Cap
Pace Bowlers
19	Xavier Bartlett	Australia	17 December 1998 (aged 23)	Right-handed	Right-arm fast-medium	
45	Spencer Johnson	Australia	16 December 1995 (aged 26)	Left-handed	Left-arm fast-medium	
20	**Michael Neser**	Australia	29 March 1990 (aged 32)	Right-handed	Right-arm medium-fast	International Cap
8	Will Prestwidge	Australia	15 January 2002 (aged 20)	Left-handed	Right-arm fast	
16	Mark Steketee	Australia	17 January 1994 (aged 28)	Right-handed	Right-arm fast-medium	

== Regular season ==
Match 3
15 December 2022 (N)
Scorecard

Melbourne Renegades; 7/166 (20 overs)	v	Brisbane Heat (H); 6/144 (20 overs)
Nic Maddinson 87 (49); Matthew Kuhnemann 3/32 (4 overs)		James Peirson 43 (30); Akeal Hosein 3/15 (4 overs)

Melbourne Renegades won by 22 runs
Cazaly's Stadium, Cairns
Attendance: 6,708
Umpires: Phillip Gillespie and Stephen Dionysius
Player of the match: Nic Maddinson (Melbourne Renegades)

- Brisbane Heat won the toss and elected to bat.
- Josh Brown made his T20 debut.

Match 10
21 December 2022 (N)
Scorecard

Brisbane Heat; 8/137 (20 overs)	v	Melbourne Renegades (H); 6/139 (19.2 overs)
James Peirson 45* (30); Tom Rogers 4/23 (4 overs)		Andre Russell 57 (42); Michael Neser 4/32 (4 overs)

Melbourne Renegades won by 4 wickets
Kardinia Park, Geelong
Attendance: 6,892
Umpires: David Taylor and Simon Lightbody
Player of the match: Andre Russell (Melbourne Renegades)

- Brisbane Heat won the toss and elected to bat.

Match 13
23 December 2022 (N)
Scorecard

Brisbane Heat (H); 9/166 (20 overs)	v	Adelaide Strikers; 9/160 (20 overs)
Sam Billings 79 (48); Matthew Short 3/14 (4 overs)		Thomas Kelly 43 (33); Mark Steketee 4/34 (4 overs)

Brisbane Heat won by 6 runs
The Gabba, Brisbane
Attendance: 17,283
Umpires: Greg Davidson and Sharad Patel
Player of the match: Sam Billings (Brisbane Heat)

- Brisbane Heat won the toss and elected to bat.

Match 17
27 December 2022 (N)
Scorecard

Brisbane Heat; 6/121 (20 overs)	v	Sydney Thunder (H); 0/124 (11.4 overs)
Colin Munro 43 (47); Chris Green 2/14 (4 overs)		Alex Hales 59* (36); Matthew Kuhnemann 0/7 (1 over)

Sydney Thunder won by 10 wickets
Sydney Showground Stadium, Sydney
Attendance: 8,534
Umpires: Donovan Koch and Michael Graham-Smith
Player of the match: Matthew Gilkes (Sydney Thunder)

- Brisbane Heat won the toss and elected to bat.

Match 19
29 December 2022 (N)
Scorecard

Sydney Thunder; 6/182 (20 overs)	v	Brisbane Heat; 9/171 (20 overs)
Rilee Rossouw 39 (35); James Bazley 4/22 (4 overs)		Colin Munro 98 (53); Nathan McAndrew 4/32 (4 overs)

Sydney Thunder won by 11 runs
Carrara Oval, Carrara
Attendance: 14,575
Umpires: Bruce Oxenford and Simon Lightbody
Player of the match: Daniel Sams (Sydney Thunder)

- Brisbane Heat won the toss and elected to field.

Match 25
1 January 2023 (N)
Scorecard

Brisbane Heat (H); 5/224 (20 overs)	v	Sydney Sixers; 209 (20 overs)
Nathan McSweeney 84 (51); Dan Christian 1/5 (1 over)		Jordan Silk 41 (23); Michael Neser 3/41 (4 overs)

Brisbane Heat won by 15 runs
The Gabba, Brisbane
Attendance: 23,689
Umpires: Donovan Koch and Nathan Johnstone
Player of the match: Josh Brown (Brisbane Heat)

- Brisbane Heat won the toss and elected to bat.

Match 28
4 January 2023 (N)
Scorecard

Brisbane Heat; 6/147 (13 overs)	v	Sydney Sixers (H)
Michael Neser 45*(18); Steve O'Keefe 3/26 (3 overs)

No result
North Sydney Oval, Sydney
Attendance: 8,384
Umpires: Sam Nogajski and Troy Penman

- Sydney Sixers won the toss and elected to field.
- Match reduced to 13 overs due to rain and later abandoned.

Match 33
7 January 2023 (N)
Scorecard

Brisbane Heat; 9/171 (20 overs)	v	Perth Scorchers (H); 3/173 (16.3 overs)
Colin Munro 45 (26); Andrew Tye 3/37 (4 overs)		Cameron Bancroft 76* (48); Matthew Kuhnemann 1/38 (4 overs)

Perth Scorchers won by 7 wickets
Perth Stadium, Perth
Attendance: 28,029
Umpires: Ben Treloar and Simon Lightbody
Player of the match: Cameron Bancroft (Perth Scorchers)

- Perth Scorchers won the toss and elected to field.

Match 37
11 January 2023 (N)
Scorecard

Brisbane Heat (H); 6/155 (20 overs)	v	Perth Scorchers; 2/157 (16.2 overs)
Max Bryant 36 (27); Jason Behrendorff 3/21 (4 overs)		Matthew Short 67* (35); Matthew Kuhnemann 1/32 (4 overs)

Perth Scorchers won by 8 wickets
The Gabba, Brisbane
Attendance: 16,816
Umpires: Eloise Sheridan and Michael Graham-Smith
Player of the match: Jason Behrendorff (Perth Scorchers)

- Perth Scorchers won the toss and elected to field.
- Spencer Johnson (Brisbane Heat) made his T20 debut.

Match 40
14 January 2023 (N)
Scorecard

Brisbane Heat; 154 (19.3 overs)	v	Adelaide Strikers (H); 9/137 (20 overs)
Marnus Labuschagne 46 (33); Harry Conway 3/36 (3.3 overs)		Matthew Short 39 (30); James Bazley 3/30 (4 overs)

Brisbane Heat won by 17 runs
Adelaide Oval, Adelaide
Attendance: 14,785
Umpires: Phillip Gillespie and Shawn Craig
Player of the match: Matthew Kuhnemann (Brisbane Heat)

- Adelaide Strikers won the toss and elected to field.

Match 44
16 January 2023 (N)
Scorecard

Melbourne Stars (H); 7/159 (20 overs)	v	Brisbane Heat; 7/160 (20 overs)
Nick Larkin 58 (36); Michael Neser 4/25 (4 overs)		Matt Renshaw 90 * (56); Liam Hatcher 2/29 (4 overs)

Brisbane Heat won by 3 wickets
Melbourne Cricket Ground, Melbourne
Attendance: 12,991
Umpires: Donovan Koch and Gerrard Abood
Player of the match: Matt Renshaw (Brisbane Heat)

- Brisbane Heat won the toss and elected to field.

Match 49
20 January 2023 (N)
Scorecard

Brisbane Heat (H); 6/162 (20 overs)	v	Hobart Hurricanes; 6/150 (20 overs)
Matt Renshaw 41 (31); Joel Paris 2/15 (4 overs)		Matthew Wade 45 (37); Michael Neser 3/27 (4 overs)

Brisbane Heat won by 12 runs
The Gabba, Brisbane
Attendance: 19,636
Umpires: Bruce Oxenford and Stephen Dionysius
Player of the match: Michael Neser (Brisbane Heat)

- Brisbane Heat won the toss and elected to bat.

Match 51
22 January 2023 (D/N)
Scorecard

Brisbane Heat (H); 4/188 (20 overs)	v	Melbourne Stars; 3/184 (20 overs)
Sam Hain 73 * (41); Luke Wood 2/38 (4 overs)		Tom Rogers 41 (20); Mitchell Swepson 2/23 (4 overs)

Brisbane Heat won by 4 runs
The Gabba, Brisbane
Attendance: 18,184
Umpires: Ben Treloar and Gerrard Abood
Player of the match: Sam Hain (Brisbane Heat)

- Brisbane Heat won the toss and elected to bat.

Match 55
25 January 2023 (D/N)
Scorecard

Hobart Hurricanes (H); 9/120 (20 overs)	v	Brisbane Heat; 8/118 (20 overs)
Macalister Wright 56 (56); Michael Neser 3/35 (4 overs)		James Peirson 39 (37); Faheem Ashraf 2/19 (4 overs)

Hobart Hurricanes won by 2 runs
York Park, Launceston
Attendance: 4,822
Umpires: Donovan Koch and Sam Nogajski
Player of the match: Nathan Ellis (Hobart Hurricanes)

- Brisbane Heat won the toss and elected to field.

== Play-offs ==
=== Matches ===
Eliminator
27 January 2023 (N)
Scorecard

Brisbane Heat; 5/203 (20 overs)	v	Sydney Thunder; 1/51 (6.5 overs)
Usman Khawaja 94 (55); Chris Green 2/29 (4 overs)		David Warner 36* (20); James Bazley 1/3 (1 over)

Brisbane Heat won by 8 runs (DLS method)
Sydney Showground Stadium, Sydney
Attendance: 7,067
Umpires: Bruce Oxenford and Phillip Gillespie
Player of the match: Usman Khawaja (Brisbane Heat)

- Sydney Thunder won the toss and elected to field.
- No further play was possible due to rain.
- Ross Pawson (Sydney Thunder) made his T20 debut.

Knockout
29 January 2023 (N)
Scorecard

Melbourne Renegades; 5/162 (20 overs)	v	Brisbane Heat; 3/164 (18.5 overs)
Shaun Marsh 82* (53); Xavier Bartlett 3/18 (4 overs)		Usman Khawaja 59 (47); Tom Rogers 2/33 (3.5 overs)

Brisbane Heat won by 7 wickets
Docklands Stadium, Melbourne
Attendance: 10,699
Umpires: Bruce Oxenford and Phillip Gillespie
Player of the match: Xavier Bartlett (Brisbane Heat)

- Brisbane Heat won the toss and elected to field.

Challenger
2 February 2023 (N)
Scorecard

Sydney Sixers; 9/116 (20 overs)	v	Brisbane Heat; 6/117 (18.2 overs)
Daniel Hughes 23 (24); Matthew Kuhnemann 3/17 (4 overs)		Michael Neser 48* (32); Izharulhaq Naveed 2/28 (4 overs)

Brisbane Heat won by 4 wickets
Sydney Cricket Ground, Sydney
Attendance: 15,852
Umpires: Donovan Koch and Sam Nogajski
Player of the match: Michael Neser (Brisbane Heat)

- Sydney Sixers won the toss and elected to bat.

Final
4 February 2023 (D/N)
Scorecard

Brisbane Heat; 7/175 (20 overs)	v	Perth Scorchers; 5/178 (19.2 overs)
Nathan McSweeney 41 (37); Jason Behrendorff 2/26 (4 overs)		Ashton Turner 53 (32); Matthew Kuhnemann 1/28 (4 overs)

Perth Scorchers won by 5 wickets
Perth Stadium, Perth
Attendance: 53,886
Umpires: Sam Nogajski and Paul Wilson
Player of the match: Ashton Turner (Perth Scorchers)

- Brisbane Heat won the toss and elected to bat.

== Season statistics ==
=== Batting ===
Most runs
Batter	Mts	Runs	HS
James Peirson	18	334	57*
Matt Renshaw	12	283	90*
Colin Munro	8	278	98
Josh Brown	14	258	62
Usman Khawaja	8	249	94

As of 4 February 2023

Highest individual score
Batter	Runs	Balls	Opp
Colin Munro	98	53	Sydney Thunder
Usman Khawaja	84	55	Sydney Thunder
Matt Renshaw	90*	56	Melbourne Stars
Nathan McSweeney	84	51	Sydney Sixers
Sam Billings	79	48	Adelaide Strikers

As of 4 February 2023

=== Bowling ===
Most wickets
Bowler	Mat	Wkts	BBI
Michael Neser	17	26	4/25
James Bazley	15	16	4/22
Matthew Kuhnemann	18	16	3/17
Mark Steketee	8	10	4/34
Spencer Johnson	10	9	3/28

As of 4 February 2023
