= 2021–22 Brisbane Heat season =

Overview of Brisbane Heat in 2021–22

Brisbane Heat
2021–22 season
- Coach: Darren Lehmann
- Captain(s): Jimmy Peirson
- Home ground: The Gabba
- BBL Season: 7th
- Leading Run Scorer: Ben Duckett (302)
- Leading Wicket Taker: Mark Steketee (12)

The 2021–22 Brisbane Heat season was the eleventh in the club's history. The team was coached by Darren Lehmann and captained by Chris Lynn, they competed in the BBL's 2021–22 season.

== Standings ==
Pos	Team	Pld	W	L	NR	BP	Pts	NRR	Qualification
1	Perth Scorchers (C)	14	11	3	0	7	40	0.926	Advanced to play-off phase
2	Sydney Sixers	14	9	4	1	6	35	1.027	Advanced to play-off phase
3	Sydney Thunder	14	9	5	0	8	35	0.725	Advanced to play-off phase
4	Adelaide Strikers	14	6	8	0	10	28	0.237	Advanced to play-off phase
5	Hobart Hurricanes	14	7	7	0	6	27	−0.332	Advanced to play-off phase
6	Melbourne Stars	14	7	7	0	5	26	−0.222	
7	Brisbane Heat	14	3	11	0	7	16	−0.910	
8	Melbourne Renegades	14	3	10	1	5	16	−1.477	

Source: ESPNcricinfo
(C) Champions

== Regular season ==
Match 2
6 December 2021
19:15 (N)
Scorecard

Brisbane Heat; 8/140 (20 overs)	v	Sydney Thunder (H); 3/141 (17.1 overs)
Ben Duckett 46 (35); Daniel Sams 3/22 (4 overs)		Alex Ross 61* (46); Liam Guthrie 2/32 (3 overs)

Sydney Thunder won by 7 wickets
Manuka Oval, Canberra
Attendance: 6,824
Umpires: Greg Davidson and Tony Wilds
Player of the match: Alex Ross (Sydney Thunder)

- Sydney Thunder won the toss and elected to field.
- Liam Guthrie (Brisbane Heat) made his T20 debut.

Match 5
8 December 2021
18:35 (N)
Scorecard

(H) Perth Scorchers; 6/157 (20 overs)	v	Brisbane Heat; 151 (19.5 overs)
Kurtis Patterson 55 (30); Cameron Gannon 2/32 (4 overs)		Xavier Bartlett 34* (25); Matthew Kelly 4/28 (4 overs)

Perth Scorchers won by 6 runs
Perth Stadium, Perth
Attendance: 16,108
Umpires: Gerard Abood and Greg Davidson
Player of the match: Matthew Kelly (Perth Scorchers)

- Perth Scorchers won the toss and elected to bat.

Match 11
13 December 2021
18:15 (N)
Scorecard

Melbourne Renegades; 6/140 (20 overs)	v	Brisbane Heat (H); 5/141 (16.5 overs)
Mackenzie Harvey 71* (56); James Bazley 3/28 (4 overs)		Sam Heazlett 44* (29); Zahir Khan 2/27 (4 overs)

Brisbane Heat won by 5 wickets
Metricon Stadium, Gold Coast
Attendance: 6,459
Umpires: Bruce Oxenford and David Taylor
Player of the match: James Bazley (Brisbane Heat)

- Brisbane Heat won the toss and elected to field.

Match 14
19 December 2021
18:40 (N)
Scorecard

Sydney Thunder; 7/196 (20 overs)	v	Brisbane Heat (H); 143 (17.3 overs)
Sam Billings 64 (27); Mitchell Swepson 2/27 (4 overs)		Xavier Bartlett 42* (29); Saqib Mahmood 4/22 (3 overs)

Sydney Thunder won by 53 runs
The Gabba, Brisbane
Attendance: 16,189
Umpires: Darren Close and Donovan Koch
Player of the match: Saqib Mahmood (Sydney Thunder)

- Brisbane won the toss and elected to field.
- X-factor subs: Tom Cooper (Brisbane Heat) replaced Tom Abell.

Match 18
23 December 2021
18:45 (N)
Scorecard

Brisbane Heat; 7/208 (20 overs)	v	Adelaide Strikers (H); 8/169 (20 overs)
Ben Duckett 78 (47); Rashid Khan 3/34 (4 overs)		Jonathan Wells 55 (41); Mark Steketee 3/27 (4 overs)

Brisbane Heat won by 39 runs
Adelaide Oval, Adelaide
Attendance: 7,581
Umpires: Nathan Johnstone and Bruce Oxenford
Player of the match: Ben Duckett (Brisbane Heat)

- Brisbane Heat won the toss and elected to bat.

Match 23
27 December 2021
20:05 (N)
Scorecard

Melbourne Stars; 9/207 (20 overs)	v	Brisbane Heat (H); 9/187 (20 overs)
Joe Clarke 85 (44); Mark Steketee 3/40 (4 overs)		Chris Lynn 57 (34); Qais Ahmad 3/26 (4 overs)

Melbourne Stars won by 20 runs
The Gabba, Brisbane
Attendance: 14,803
Umpires: Gerard Abood and Tony Wilds
Player of the match: Joe Clarke (Melbourne Stars)

- Brisbane Heat won the toss and elected to field.

Match 25
29 December 2021
18:05 (N)
Scorecard

Brisbane Heat; 105 (19.1 overs)	v	Sydney Sixers (H); 8/106 (20 overs)
Jack Wildermuth 27 (26); Sean Abbott 4/31 (4 overs)		Sean Abbott 37* (43); Jack Wildermuth 2/18 (4 overs)

Sydney Sixers won by 2 wickets.
Sydney Cricket Ground, Sydney
Attendance: 11,354
Umpires: Darren Close and Sam Nogajski
Player of the match: Sean Abbott (Sydney Sixers)

- Brisbane Heat won the toss and elected to bat.
- X-factor subs: Jack Wildermuth (Brisbane Heat) replaced Matthew Kuhnemann.

Match 29
1 January 2022
16:00 (D/N)
Scorecard

Brisbane Heat; 8/150 (20 overs)	v	Hobart Hurricanes (H); 8/136 (20 overs)
James Bazley 44* (27); Nathan Ellis 3/41 (4 overs)		Tom Rogers 33* (20); Xavier Bartlett 4/30 (4 overs)

Brisbane Heat won by 14 runs
Blundstone Arena, Hobart
Umpires: Michael Graham-Smith and Nathan Johnstone
Player of the match: Xavier Bartlett (Brisbane Heat)

- Hobart Hurricanes won the toss and elected to field.
- X-factor subs: Jack Wildermuth (Brisbane Heat) replaced Liam Guthrie.

Match 37
6 January 2022
18:05 (N)
Scorecard

Brisbane Heat; 6/128 (20 overs)	v	Melbourne Renegades (H); 5/129 (15 overs)
Jake Lehmann 65 (52); Mohammad Nabi 2/19 (4 overs)		Shaun Marsh 57 (35); David Grant 3/20 (4 overs)

Melbourne Renegades won by 5 wickets
GMHBA Stadium, Geelong
Umpires: Bruce Oxenford and Ben Treloar
Player of the match: Shaun Marsh (Melbourne Renegades)

- Melbourne Renegades won the toss and elected to field.
- Jack Clayton, David Grant, Ronan McDonald, Steve McGiffin, Lachlan Pfeffer and Will Prestwidge (Brisbane Heat) all made their T20 debuts.
- X-factor subs: Mohammad Nabi (Melbourne Renegades) replaced James Pattinson.

Match 41
8 January 2022
19:30 (N)
Scorecard

(H) Brisbane Heat; 8/144 (20 overs)	v	Hobart Hurricanes; 2/145 (17.2 overs)
Lachlan Pfeffer 69 (51); Sandeep Lamichhane 2/23 (4 overs)		Ben McDermott 93 (61); Will Prestwidge 2/37 (3.2 overs)

Hobart Hurricanes won by 8 wickets
The Gabba, Brisbane
Umpires: Gerard Abood and David Taylor
Player of the match: Ben McDermott (Hobart Hurricanes)

- Hobart Hurricanes won the toss and elected to field.
- Paddy Dooley (Brisbane Heat) and Will Sanders (Hobart Hurricanes) both made their T20 debuts.
- X-factor subs: Mac Wright (Hobart Hurricanes) replaced Will Sanders.

Match 46
12 January 2022
18:15 (N)
Scorecard

Adelaide Strikers; 4/161 (20 overs)	v	Brisbane Heat (H); 90 (15 overs)
Jake Weatherald 35 (31); Will Prestwidge 2/34 (4 overs)		Ben Duckett 24 (18); Rashid Khan 6/17 (4 overs)

Adelaide Strikers won by 71 runs
The Gabba, Brisbane
Umpires: Phillip Gillespie and Simon Lightbody
Player of the match: Rashid Khan (Adelaide Strikers)

- Adelaide Strikers won the toss and elected to bat.

Match 51
16 January 2022
19:15 (N)
Scorecard

Brisbane Heat; 6/149 (20 overs)	v	Melbourne Stars (H); 2/150 (13.5 overs)
Ben Duckett 51 (42); Glenn Maxwell 2/19 (4 overs)		Joe Clarke 62 (36); James Bazley 1/34 (3.5 overs)

Melbourne Stars won by 8 wickets
Melbourne Cricket Ground, Melbourne
Attendance: 7,099
Umpires: Shawn Craig and Tony Wilds
Player of the match: Glenn Maxwell (Melbourne Stars)

- Brisbane Heat won the toss and elected to bat.
- X-factor subs: Nick Larkin (Melbourne Stars) replaced Brody Couch.

Match 53
17 January 2022
20:15 (N)
Scorecard

(H) Brisbane Heat; 7/155 (20 overs)	v	Perth Scorchers; 4/156 (18.4 overs)
Max Bryant 81 (56); Peter Hatzoglou 2/17 (4 overs)		Mitchell Marsh 59 (34); Mitchell Swepson 2/19 (4 overs)

Perth Scorchers won by 6 wickets
Marvel Stadium, Melbourne
Attendance: 480
Umpires: Shawn Craig and Ben Treloar
Player of the match: Mitchell Marsh (Perth Scorchers)

- Brisbane Heat won the toss and elected to bat.

Match 36 (Note: Originally the match was scheduled to be played on 5 January 2022 but was postponed due to COVID-19 cases in Brisbane Heat's squad.)
19 January 2022
12:05
Scorecard

Sydney Sixers; 6/178 (20 overs)	v	Brisbane Heat (H); 8/151 (20 overs)
Daniel Hughes 59 (45); Michael Neser 3/39 (4 overs)		Max Bryant 57 (55); Hayden Kerr 3/23 (4 overs)

Sydney Sixers won by 27 runs
The Gabba, Brisbane
Umpires: Phillip Gillespie and David Taylor
Player of the match: Daniel Hughes (Sydney Sixers)

- Brisbane Heat won the toss and elected to field.
- Chris Lynn (Brisbane Heat) became the first player to score 3,000 runs in the BBL.

== Squad information ==
The Brisbane Heat squad for the 2021–22 Big Bash League season.

- Players with international caps are listed in **bold**.
- Ages are given as of the first match of the tournament, 5 December 2021

No	Name	Nationality	Date of birth (age)	Batting style	Bowling style	Notes
Batsmen
5	**Sam Heazlett**	Australia	29 December 1990 (aged 30)	Left-handed	Left-arm orthodox	
17	Max Bryant	Australia	3 October 1999 (aged 22)	Right-handed	Right-arm medium	
26	**Tom Cooper**	Netherlands	26 November 1986 (aged 35)	Right-handed	Right-arm off-break	Non-visa Dutch international
50	**Chris Lynn**	Australia	10 April 1990 (aged 31)	Right-handed	Left-arm orthodox	
All-rounders
7	James Bazley	Australia	8 April 1995 (aged 26)	Right-handed	Right-arm medium-fast	
33	**Marnus Labuschagne**	Australia	22 June 1994 (aged 27)	Right-handed	Right-arm leg-break	
7	**Michael Neser**	Australia	29 March 1990 (aged 31)	Right-handed	Right-arm medium-fast	
–	Tom Abell	England	5 March 1994 (age 27)	Right-handed	Right-arm medium	Visa contract
24	**Jack Wildermuth**	Australia	1 September 1993 (aged 28)	Right-handed	Right-arm medium-fast	
Wicketkeepers
18	**Tom Banton**	England	11 November 1998 (aged 23)	Right-handed	–	Visa contract
–	**Ben Duckett**	England	17 October 1994 (age 27)	Left-handed	Right-arm off break	Visa contract
59	Jimmy Peirson	Australia	13 October 1992 (aged 29)	Right-handed	–	Captain
Pace bowlers
6	Mark Steketee	Australia	17 January 1994 (aged 27)	Right-handed	Right-arm fast-medium	
19	Xavier Bartlett	Australia	17 December 1998 (aged 22)	Right-handed	Right-arm medium-fast	
38	Matthew Willans	Australia	18 December 2000 (aged 20)	Right-handed	Left-arm fast	
42	Connor Sully	Australia	24 October 2000 (aged 21)	Right-handed	Right arm fast	
Spin bowlers
4	**Mitchell Swepson**	Australia	4 October 1993 (aged 28)	Right-handed	Right Arm leg break	
30	Matthew Kuhnemann	Australia	20 September 1996 (aged 25)	Left-handed	Left-arm orthodox	
88	**Mujeeb Ur Rahman**	Afghanistan	28 March 2001 (aged 20)	Right-handed	Right-arm off break	Visa contract
