= 2015–16 Brisbane Heat season =

Cricket team season

Brisbane Heat
2015–16 season
- Coach: Daniel Vettori (5th season)
- Captain(s): Chris Lynn (5th season)
- Home ground: The Gabba, Brisbane
- BBL: 6th
- BBL Finals: DNQ
- Highest home attendance: 33,783 vs Strikers (8 January 2016)
- Lowest home attendance: 26,245 vs Renegades (19 December 2015)
- Average home attendance: 29,352

== Ladder ==
Pos	Team	Pld	W	L	NR	Pts	NRR	Qualification
1	Adelaide Strikers	8	7	1	0	14	0.544	Advanced to semi-finals
2	Melbourne Stars	8	5	3	0	10	0.366	Advanced to semi-finals
3	Perth Scorchers	8	5	3	0	10	0.181	Advanced to semi-finals
4	Sydney Thunder (C)	8	4	4	0	8	0.375	Advanced to semi-finals
5	Melbourne Renegades	8	3	5	0	6	−0.041	
6	Brisbane Heat	8	3	5	0	6	−0.204	
7	Hobart Hurricanes	8	3	5	0	6	−0.955	
8	Sydney Sixers	8	2	6	0	4	−0.330	

(C) Champions

=== Ladder progress ===
Round	1	2	3	4	5	6	7	8
Ground	H	A	A	H	H	H	A	A
Result	L	L	L	L	W	L	W	W
Position	6	8	8	8	8	8	8	6

Source: Competitive Matches
A = Away; H = Home; W = Win; D = Draw; L = Lose

=== Regular season ===
19 December
18:10 (D/N)
Scorecard

(H) Brisbane Heat; 5/180 (20 overs)	v	Melbourne Renegades; 3/184 (19.3 overs)
Chris Lynn 35 (20); Xavier Doherty 2/29 (4 overs)		Aaron Finch 65 (45); Andrew Fekete 2/44 (4 overs)

Melbourne Renegades won by 7 wickets
The Gabba
Attendance: 26,245
Umpires: Ashley Barrow and Sam Nogajski
Player of the match: Aaron Finch (Renegades)

- Brisbane Heat won the toss and elected to bat.
- Guy Walker (Renegades) made his T20 debut.

22 December
19:10 (D/N)
Scorecard

(H) Hobart Hurricanes; 3/184 (20 overs)	v	Brisbane Heat; 8/164 (20 overs)
Tim Paine 87* (58); Ben Cutting 1/32 (4 overs)		Jason Floros 42 (23); Sam Rainbird 3/37 (4 overs)

Hobart Hurricanes won by 20 runs
Blundstone Arena
Attendance: 14,848
Umpires: Greg Davidson and Michael Graham-Smith
Player of the match: Tim Paine (Hurricanes)

- Hobart Hurricanes won the toss and elected to bat.
- The crowd of 14,848 is the highest in Tasmanian domestic cricket history, beating the previous record of 14,744 set in the previous season between the same teams.

26 December
16:10
Scorecard

Brisbane Heat; 7/117 (20 overs)	v	Perth Scorchers (H); 1/118 (15.1 overs)
Chris Lynn 75* (58); Andrew Tye 3/23 (4 overs)		Michael Klinger 53* (42); Andrew Fekete 1/16 (2 overs)

Perth Scorchers won by 9 wickets
#TheFurnace
Attendance: 19,225
Umpires: Shawn Craig and Michael Graham-Smith
Player of the match: David Willey (Scorchers)

- Brisbane Heat won the toss and elected to bat.

29 December
18:10 (D/N)
Scorecard

Hobart Hurricanes; 4/194 (20 overs)	v	Brisbane Heat (H); 9/179 (20 overs)
Daniel Christian 56* (24); Samuel Badree 2/27 (4 overs)		Chris Lynn 101 (51); Jake Reed 3/31 (4 overs)

Hobart Hurricanes won by 15 runs
The Gabba
Attendance: 29,876
Umpires: Ashley Barrow and Simon Fry
Player of the match: Chris Lynn (Heat)

- Hobart Hurricanes won the toss and elected to bat.
- Sam Heazlett (Heat) made his T20 debut.

3 January
18:10 (D/N)
Scorecard

Sydney Thunder; 5/186 (20 overs)	v	Brisbane Heat (H); 4/189 (19.3 overs)
Michael Hussey 56 (43); Samuel Badree 1/26 (4 overs)		Chris Lynn 75 (32); Andre Russell 2/28 (4 overs)

Brisbane Heat won by 6 wickets
The Gabba
Attendance: 27,507
Umpires: Simon Fry and Michael Graham-Smith
Player of the match: Chris Lynn (Heat)

- Brisbane Heat won the toss and elected to field.

8 January
18:40 (D/N)
Scorecard

(H) Brisbane Heat; 6/175 (20 overs)	v	Adelaide Strikers; 2/179 (18.4 overs)
Jimmy Peirson 51 (36); Adil Rashid 2/17 (4 overs)		Tim Ludeman 57* (49); Samuel Badree 1/25 (4 overs)

Adelaide Strikers won by 8 wickets
The Gabba
Attendance: 33,783
Umpires: Ashley Barrow and Phillip Gillespie
Player of the match: Mahela Jayawardene (Strikers)

- Adelaide Strikers won the toss and elected to field.
- The crowd of 33,783 is the highest crowd at the Gabba for a BBL match.

10 January
19:25 (D/N)
Scorecard

Brisbane Heat; 8/162 (20 overs)	v	Sydney Sixers (H); 8/156 (20 overs)
Joe Burns 60 (51); Sean Abbott 3/8 (2 overs)		Michael Lumb 47 (38); Mitchell Swepson 2/26 (3 overs)

Brisbane Heat won by 6 runs
Sydney Cricket Ground
Attendance: 24,192
Umpires: Phillip Gillespie and Michael Graham-Smith
Player of the match: Joe Burns (Heat)

- Brisbane Heat won the toss and elected to bat.
- Nick Larkin (Sixers) and Mitchell Swepson (Heat) both made their T20 debuts.

14 January
19:40 (D/N)
Scorecard

Brisbane Heat; 7/188 (20 overs)	v	Melbourne Stars (H); 9/132 (20 overs)
Chris Lynn 56 (24); Adam Zampa 2/31 (4 overs)		Evan Gulbis 61* (52); Samuel Badree 5/22 (4 overs)

Brisbane Heat won by 56 runs
Melbourne Cricket Ground
Attendance: 30,649
Umpires: Greg Davidson and Sam Nogajski
Player of the match: Samuel Badree (Heat)

- Melbourne Stars won the toss and elected to field.

== Squad ==
- Ages are given as of 17 December 2015, the date of the first match played in the tournament

Players with international caps are listed in bold.

No.	Name	Nationality	Date of birth	Batting style	Bowling style	Notes
	Batsmen					
62	**Joe Burns**	Australia	6 September 1989 (aged 26)	Right-handed	Right arm medium	
54	**Lendl Simmons**	West Indies	25 January 1985 (aged 30)	Right-handed	Right arm medium	Overseas player (replaced McCullum)
14	**Alex Doolan**	Australia	29 November 1985 (aged 30)	Right-handed	Right arm medium	
	**Peter Forrest**	Australia	15 November 1985 (aged 30)	Right-handed	Right arm medium	
50	**Chris Lynn**	Australia	10 April 1990 (aged 25)	Right-handed	Left arm orthodox	Captain
36	**Nathan Reardon**	Australia	8 November 1984 (aged 31)	Left-handed	Right arm medium	
	All-rounders					
52	Jason Floros	Australia	24 December 1990 (aged 24)	Left-handed	Right arm off spin	
39	**James Hopes**	Australia	24 November 1978 (aged 37)	Right-handed	Right arm fast medium	
24	Jack Wildermuth	Australia	1 September 1993 (aged 22)	Right-handed	Right arm medium fast	
	Wicketkeepers					
42	**Brendon McCullum**	New Zealand	27 September 1981 (aged 34)	Right-handed	Right arm medium	Overseas player (withdrew from BBL05)
59	James Peirson	Australia	13 October 1992 (aged 23)	Right-handed	—	
	Bowlers					
16	Nick Buchanan	Australia	4 March 1991 (aged 24)	Right-handed	Right arm fast medium	
12	Andrew Fekete	Australia	18 May 1985 (aged 30)	Right-handed	Right arm fast medium	
58	Luke Feldman	Australia	1 August 1984 (aged 31)	Right-handed	Right arm fast medium	
2	Josh Lalor	Australia	4 November 1987 (aged 28)	Right-handed	Left arm fast medium	
31	**Ben Cutting**	Australia	30 January 1987 (aged 28)	Right-handed	Right arm fast medium	
6	Mark Steketee	Australia	17 January 1994 (aged 21)	Right-handed	Right arm fast medium	
77	**Samuel Badree**	West Indies	8 March 1981 (aged 34)	Right-handed	Right arm leg spin	Overseas player
4	Mitchell Swepson	Australia	4 October 1993 (aged 22)	Right-handed	Right arm leg spin	

== Home attendance ==
Game	Opponent	Attendance
1	Melbourne Renegades	26,245
4	Hobart Hurricanes	29,876
5	Sydney Thunder	27,507
6	Adelaide Strikers	33,783
Total Attendance		117,411
Average Attendance		29,353
