= 2023–24 Brisbane Heat season =

Overview of Brisbane Heat in 2023–24

Brisbane Heat
2023–24 season
- Coach: Wade Seccombe
- Captain(s): Usman Khawaja; James Peirson (Acting)
- Home ground: The Gabba, Brisbane
- BBL Season: 1st Place
- BBL finals: Champion
- Leading Run Scorer: Josh Brown (366)
- Leading Wicket Taker: Xavier Bartlett (20)

The 2023-24 season was the Brisbane Heat's 13th in the Twenty20 cricket Big Bash League. The team was coached by Wade Seccombe and captained by Usman Khawaja. Their home ground is the Brisbane Cricket Ground, also known as "the Gabba" in Brisbane, Queensland, Australia.

== Roster ==
The team's squad for the 2023–24 Big Bash League season as of 22 November 2023.

- Players with international caps are listed in **bold**
- Ages are given as of the Heats opening match of the tournament, 7 December 2023

No.	Name	Nationality	Date of birth	Batting style	Bowling style	Notes
Batters
71	**Sam Billings**	England	15 June 1991 (aged 32)	Right-handed	—	Overseas player & International Cap, Wicketkeeper-batter
98	Josh Brown	Australia	26 December 1993 (aged 29)	Right-handed	Right-arm medium	
17	Max Bryant	Australia	10 March 1999 (aged 24)	Right-handed	Right-arm medium	
18	**Usman Khawaja**	Australia	18 December 1986 (aged 36)	Left-handed	Right-arm medium	International Cap
33	**Marnus Labuschagne**	Australia	22 June 1994 (aged 29)	Right-handed	Right-arm leg break	International Cap
82	**Colin Munro**	New Zealand	11 March 1987 (aged 36)	Left-handed	Right-arm medium-fast	Overseas player & International Cap
77	**Matt Renshaw**	Australia	28 March 1996 (aged 27)	Left-handed	Right-arm off break	International Cap
All-rounders
20	**Michael Neser**	Australia	29 March 1990 (aged 33)	Right-handed	Right-arm medium-fast	International Cap
96	Nathan McSweeney	Australia	8 March 1999 (aged 24)	Right-handed	Right-arm off break	
22	Paul Walter	England	28 May 1994 (aged 29)	Left-handed	Left-arm fast-medium	Overseas player
24	**Jack Wildermuth**	Australia	1 September 1993 (aged 30)	Right-handed	Right-arm medium-fast	International Cap
Wicket-Keepers
59	James Peirson	Australia	13 October 1992 (aged 31)	Right-handed	—	
Spin Bowlers
30	**Matthew Kuhnemann**	Australia	20 July 1996 (aged 27)	Left-handed	Slow left arm orthodox	International Cap
4	**Mitchell Swepson**	Australia	4 October 1993 (aged 30)	Right-handed	Right-arm leg break	International Cap
Pace Bowlers
19	Xavier Bartlett	Australia	17 December 1998 (aged 24)	Right-handed	Right-arm fast-medium	
45	**Spencer Johnson**	Australia	16 December 1995 (aged 27)	Left-handed	Left-arm fast-medium	International Cap
8	Will Prestwidge	Australia	15 January 2002 (aged 21)	Left-handed	Right-arm fast	

== Standings ==
Pos	Team	Pld	W	L	NR	Pts	NRR	Qualification
1	Brisbane Heat (C)	10	7	1	2	16	0.972	Advanced to Qualifier
2	Sydney Sixers	10	6	2	2	14	0.339	Advanced to Qualifier
3	Perth Scorchers	10	6	3	1	13	0.725	Advanced to Knockout
4	Adelaide Strikers	10	5	4	1	11	0.331	Advanced to Knockout
5	Hobart Hurricanes	10	4	6	0	8	−0.268	
6	Melbourne Stars	10	4	6	0	8	−1.051	
7	Melbourne Renegades	10	2	6	2	6	−0.289	
8	Sydney Thunder	10	1	7	2	4	−0.652	

Source: ESPNcricinfo
(C) Champions

== Regular season ==
Match 1
7 December 2023
19:15 (N)
Scorecard

Brisbane Heat; 3/214 (20 overs)	v	Melbourne Stars; 111 (15.1 overs)
Colin Munro 99* (61); Nathan Coulter-Nile 1/35 (4 overs)		Hilton Cartwright 33 (16); Mitchell Swepson 3/23 (3.1 overs)

Brisbane Heat won by 103 runs
The Gabba, Brisbane
Attendance: 20,315
Umpires: Gerard Abood and Paul Wilson
Player of the match: Colin Munro (Brisbane Heat)

- Melbourne Stars won the toss and elected to field.

Match 3
9 December 2023
19:15 (N)
Scorecard

Adelaide Strikers	v	Brisbane Heat

Match abandoned without a ball bowled
Adelaide Oval, Adelaide
Attendance: TBA
Umpires: Shawn Craig and Nathan Johnstone

- No toss.
- No play was possible due to rain.

Match 6
12 December 2023
19:15 (N)
Scorecard

Brisbane Heat; 7/151 (20 overs)	v	Sydney Thunder; 131 (19 overs)
Colin Munro 46 (33); Tanveer Sangha 3/21 (4 overs)		Oliver Davies 35 (30); Xavier Bartlett 3/35 (4 overs)

Brisbane Heat won by 20 runs
Manuka Oval, Canberra
Attendance: TBA
Umpires: Gerard Abood and Bruce Oxenford
Player of the match: Mitchell Swepson (Brisbane Heat)

- Sydney Thunder won the toss and elected to field.

Match 10
21 December 2023
19:15 (N)
Scorecard

Melbourne Renegades; 8/162 (20 overs)	v	Brisbane Heat; 4/163 (18.1 overs)
Jake Fraser-McGurk 55 (23); Paul Walter 3/27 (4 overs)		Matt Renshaw 49* (37); Mujeeb Ur Rahman 2/27 (4 overs)

Brisbane Heat won by 6 wickets
Docklands Stadium, Melbourne
Attendance: 14,893
Umpires: Phillip Gillespie and Claire Polosak
Player of the match: Paul Walter (Brisbane Heat)

- Brisbane Heat won the toss and elected to field.

Match 16
27 December 2023
18:15 (N)
Scorecard

Brisbane Heat; 172 (19.4 overs)	v	Sydney Thunder; 9/157 (20 overs)
Nathan McSweeney 73 (52); Daniel Sams 5/30 (4 overs)		Cameron Bancroft 46 (39); Xavier Bartlett 3/29 (4 overs)

Brisbane Heat won by 15 runs
The Gabba, Brisbane
Attendance: 29,155
Umpires: Donovan Koch and Simon Lightbody
Player of the match: Nathan McSweeney (Brisbane Heat)

- Brisbane Heat won the toss and elected to bat.

Match 22
1 January 2024
18:15 (N)
Scorecard

Brisbane Heat	v	Sydney Sixers

Match abandoned without a ball bowled
The Gabba, Brisbane
Attendance: –
Umpires: Stephen Dionysius and Ben Treloar

- No toss.
- No play was possible due to rain.

Match 24
3 January 2024
18:05 (N)
Scorecard

Sydney Sixers; 8/141 (20 overs)	v	Brisbane Heat; 4/104 (14.3 overs)
Josh Philippe 41 (36); Matthew Kuhnemann 2/19 (4 overs)		Josh Brown 43 (31); Ben Dwarshuis 1/7 (2 overs)

Brisbane Heat won by 3 runs (DLS method)
Coffs Harbour International Stadium, Coffs Harbour
Attendance: 10,372
Umpires: Simon Lightbody and Paul Wilson
Player of the match: Paul Walter (Brisbane Heat)

- Brisbane Heat won the toss and elected to field.
- No further play was possible due to rain.

Match 29
7 January 2024
18:15 (N)
Scorecard

Brisbane Heat; 132/7 (20 overs)	v	Hobart Hurricanes; 116/9 (16 overs)
Colin Munro 56 (47); Chris Jordan 3/19 (4 overs)		Nikhil Chaudhary 55 (38); Xavier Bartlett 3/30 (4 overs)

Brisbane Heat won by 1 run (DLS method)
The Gabba, Brisbane
Umpires: Sam Nogajski and Shawn Craig
Player of the match: Xavier Bartlett (BRH)

- Hobart Hurricanes won the toss and decided to bowl first.

Match 32
10 January 2024
18:40 (N)
Scorecard

Brisbane Heat; 6/191 (20 overs)	v	Perth Scorchers; 9/168 (20 overs)
Michael Neser 64* (30); Ashton Agar 2/29 (4 overs)		Laurie Evans 51 (29); Spencer Johnson 2/23 (4 overs)

Brisbane Heat won by 23 runs
The Gabba, Brisbane
Attendance: –
Umpires: Greg Davidson and David Taylor
Player of the match: Michael Neser (Brisbane Heat)

- Brisbane Heat won the toss and elected to bat.

Match 35
13 January 2024
13:15
Scorecard

Perth Scorchers; 6/163 (20 overs)	v	Brisbane Heat; 128 (19.5 overs)
Nick Hobson 48* (30); Michael Neser 2/21 (3 overs)		Jimmy Peirson 42 (41); Andrew Tye 4/14 (3.5 overs)

Perth Scorchers won by 35 runs
Optus Stadium, Perth
Attendance: 32,583
Umpires: Bruce Oxenford and Nathan Johnstone
Player of the match: Nick Hobson (Perth Scorchers)

- Perth Scorchers won the toss and elected to bat.

== Play-offs ==
Qualifier
19 January 2024
18:40 AEST (N)
Scorecard

Sydney Sixers; 152/8 (20 overs)	v	Brisbane Heat; 113 (17.5 overs)
Moises Henriques 59 (50); Michael Neser 3/27 (4 overs)		Jimmy Peirson 26 (25); Ben Dwarshuis 5/21 (3.5 overs)

Sydney Sixers won by 39 runs
Heritage Bank Stadium, Carrara
Attendance: –
Umpires: Michael Graham-Smith and Sam Nogajski
Player of the match: Ben Dwarshuis (Sydney Sixers)

- Brisbane Heat won the toss and elected to field.

Challenger
22 January 2024
18:40 AEST (N)
Scorecard

Brisbane Heat; 7/214 (20 overs)	v	Adelaide Strikers; 160 (19.5 overs)
Josh Brown 140 (57); David Payne 2/17 (3 overs)		Harry Nielsen 50 (33); Spencer Johnson 3/20 (4 overs)

Brisbane Heat won by 54 runs
Heritage Bank Stadium, Carrara
Attendance: –
Umpires: Gerard Abood and Sam Nogajski
Player of the match: Josh Brown (Brisbane Heat)

- Brisbane Heat won the toss and elected to bat.

Final
24 January 2024
19:15 AEDT (N)
Scorecard

Brisbane Heat; 8/166 (20 overs)	v	Sydney Sixers; 112 (17.3 overs)
Josh Brown 53 (38); Sean Abbott 4/32 (4 overs)		Moises Henriques 25 (27); Spencer Johnson 4/26 (4 overs)

Brisbane Heat won by 54 runs
Sydney Cricket Ground, Sydney
Attendance: 43,153
Umpires: Gerard Abood and Sam Nogajski
Player of the match: Spencer Johnson (Brisbane Heat)

- Sydney Sixers won the toss and elected to field.
