= 2016–17 Brisbane Heat season =

Cricket team season

Brisbane Heat
2016–17 season
- Coach: Daniel Vettori (5th season)
- Captain(s): Brendon McCullum (6th season)
- Home ground: The Gabba, Brisbane
- Highest home attendance: 35,112 vs Renegades (20 January 2017)
- Lowest home attendance: 32,371 vs Sixers (3 January 2017)
- Average home attendance: 34,190

== Ladder ==
Pos	Team	Pld	W	L	NR	Pts	NRR	Qualification
1	Perth Scorchers (C)	8	5	3	0	10	0.618	Advanced to semi-finals
2	Brisbane Heat	8	5	3	0	10	0.516	Advanced to semi-finals
3	Sydney Sixers	8	5	3	0	10	−0.848	Advanced to semi-finals
4	Melbourne Stars	8	4	4	0	8	0.397	Advanced to semi-finals
5	Melbourne Renegades	8	4	4	0	8	0.042	
6	Adelaide Strikers	8	3	5	0	6	0.334	
7	Hobart Hurricanes	8	3	5	0	6	−0.530	
8	Sydney Thunder	8	3	5	0	6	−0.600	

(C) Champions

=== Ladder progress ===
Round	1	2	3	4	5	6	7	8
Ground	A	A	H	H	A	H	A	H
Result	W	W	W	L	W	L	W	L
Position	1	1	1	1	1	2	1	2

Source: Competitive Matches
A = Away; H = Home; W = Win; D = Draw; L = Lose

=== Regular season ===
21 December
19:10 (D/N)
Scorecard

Brisbane Heat; 5/206 (20 overs)	v	Adelaide Strikers (H); 6/196 (20 overs)
Alex Ross 64 (36); Kieron Pollard 2/27 (4 overs)		Ben Dunk 85 (43); Mark Steketee 3/32 (4 overs)

Brisbane Heat won by 10 runs
Adelaide Oval
Attendance: 38,011
Umpires: Shawn Craig and Sam Nogajski
Player of the match: Brendon McCullum (Heat)

- Adelaide Strikers won the toss and elected to field.
- Liam O'Connor, Jake Weatherald (Strikers) and Jack Wildermuth (Heat) all made their T20 debuts.

28 December
19:10 (D/N)
Scorecard

(H) Sydney Thunder; 7/157 (20 overs)	v	Brisbane Heat; 7/160 (19.4 overs)
Eoin Morgan 52 (43); Samuel Badree 2/20 (4 overs)		Chris Lynn 85* (48); Fawad Ahmed 2/19 (4 overs)

Brisbane Heat won by 3 wickets
Spotless Stadium
Attendance: 20,234
Umpires: Shawn Craig and Damien Mealey
Player of the match: Chris Lynn (Heat)

- Brisbane Heat won the toss and elected to field.

30 December
18:10 (D/N)
Scorecard

Hobart Hurricanes; 9/173 (20 overs)	v	Brisbane Heat (H); 3/174 (16.2 overs)
Daniel Christian 33 (23); Jack Wildermuth 2/26 (3 overs)		Chris Lynn 84* (50); Stuart Broad 1/24 (3 overs)

Brisbane Heat won by 7 wickets
The Gabba
Attendance: 34,601
Umpires: John Ward and Paul Wilson
Player of the match: Chris Lynn (Heat)

- Brisbane Heat won the toss and elected to field.

3 January
18:10 (D/N)
Scorecard

(H) Brisbane Heat; 6/186 (20 overs)	v	Sydney Sixers; 7/191 (19.4 overs)
Joe Burns 51* (33); Sean Abbott 3/38 (4 overs)		Daniel Hughes 85 (55); Mitchell Swepson 2/25 (4 overs)

Sydney Sixers won by 3 wickets
The Gabba
Attendance: 32,371
Umpires: Ashley Barrow and Mick Martell
Player of the match: Daniel Hughes (Sixers)

- Sydney Sixers won the toss and elected to field.
- Henry Thornton (Sixers) made his T20 debut.

5 January
16:10
Scorecard

(H) Perth Scorchers; 6/173 (20 overs)	v	Brisbane Heat; 1/174 (14.4 overs)
Mitchell Marsh 70 (41); Mitchell Swepson 2/27 (4 overs)		Chris Lynn 98* (49); David Willey 1/30 (2 overs)

Brisbane Heat won by 9 wickets
#TheFurnace
Attendance: 20,446
Umpires: Phillip Gillespie and John Ward
Player of the match: Chris Lynn (Heat)

- Perth Scorchers won the toss and elected to bat.
- Chris Lynn equaled the record for the most number of sixes hit a BBL innings (11).

11 January
18:40 (D/N)
Scorecard

Perth Scorchers; 5/156 (20 overs)	v	Brisbane Heat (H); 129 (19.2 overs)
Michael Klinger 81 (54); Mitchell Swepson 2/22 (4 overs)		Alex Ross 39 (40); Andrew Tye 4/22 (3.2 overs)

Perth Scorchers won by 27 runs
The Gabba
Attendance: 34,677
Umpires: Simon Fry and Michael Graham-Smith
Player of the match: Michael Klinger (Scorchers)

- Brisbane Heat won the toss and elected to field.
- The crowd of 34,677 is the highest ever for a BBL match at the Gabba.
- Andrew Tye (Scorchers) took a hat-trick.

17 January
19:40 (D/N)
Scorecard

(H) Melbourne Stars; 7/138 (20 overs)	v	Brisbane Heat; 3/139 (18.1 overs)
Luke Wright 60* (55); Mitchell Swepson 2/14 (4 overs)		Alex Ross 46* (40); Evan Gulbis 1/8 (1 over)

Brisbane Heat won by 7 wickets
Melbourne Cricket Ground
Attendance: 40,225
Umpires: Gerard Abood and Michael Graham-Smith
Player of the match: Mitchell Swepson (Heat)

- Melbourne Stars won the toss and elected to bat.
- Marnus Labuschagne (Heat) made his T20 debut.

20 January
18:40 (D/N)
Scorecard

Melbourne Renegades; 5/199 (20 overs)	v	Brisbane Heat (H); 198 (19.5 overs)
Aaron Finch 71 (35); Mark Steketee 2/37 (4 overs)		Brendon McCullum 64 (40); Thisara Perera 2/27 (4 overs)

Melbourne Renegades won by 1 run
The Gabba
Attendance: 35,112
Umpires: Shawn Craig and Sam Nogajski
Player of the match: Aaron Finch (Renegades)

- Brisbane Heat won the toss and elected to field.
- Andrew Harriott (Renegades) made his T20 debut.
- The crowd of 35,112 is the highest ever for a BBL match at the Gabba.

== Squad ==
- Dates of birth are given as of 20 December 2016, the date of the opening match of the tournament

No.	Name	Nationality	Date of birth (age)	Batting style	Bowling style	Notes
Batsmen
62	Joe Burns	Australia	6 September 1989 (aged 27)	Right-handed	Right arm medium	International Cap
14	Alex Doolan	Australia	29 November 1985 (aged 31)	Right-handed	Right arm medium	International Cap
5	Sam Heazlett	Australia	12 September 1995 (aged 21)	Left-handed	Left arm orthodox	
9	Marnus Labuschagne	Australia	22 June 1994 (aged 22)	Right-handed	Right arm leg spin	
50	Chris Lynn	Australia	10 April 1990 (aged 26)	Right-handed	Left arm orthodox	International Cap
36	Nathan Reardon	Australia	8 November 1984 (aged 32)	Left-handed	Right arm medium	International Cap
49	Alex Ross	Australia	17 April 1992 (aged 24)	Right-handed	Right arm off spin	
42	Brendon McCullum	New Zealand	27 September 1981 (aged 35)	Right-handed	Right arm medium	Captain, Visa contract & International Cap
All-rounders
52	Jason Floros	Australia	24 December 1990 (aged 25)	Left-handed	Right arm off spin	
24	Jack Wildermuth	Australia	1 September 1993 (aged 23)	Right-handed	Right arm medium fast	
Wicketkeepers
59	James Peirson	Australia	13 October 1992 (aged 24)	Right-handed	–	
Pace bowlers
16	Nick Buchanan	Australia	3 April 1991 (aged 25)	Right-handed	Right arm fast medium	
31	Ben Cutting	Australia	30 January 1987 (aged 29)	Right-handed	Right arm fast medium	
12	Andrew Fekete	Australia	18 May 1985 (aged 31)	Right-handed	Right arm fast medium	
58	Luke Feldman	Australia	1 August 1984 (aged 32)	Right-handed	Right arm fast medium	
2	Josh Lalor	Australia	4 November 1987 (aged 29)	Right-handed	Left arm fast medium	
6	Mark Steketee	Australia	17 January 1994 (aged 22)	Right-handed	Right arm fast medium	
Spin bowlers
77	Samuel Badree	West Indies	8 March 1981 (aged 35)	Right-handed	Right arm leg spin	Visa contract & International Cap
4	Mitchell Swepson	Australia	4 October 1993 (aged 23)	Right-handed	Right arm leg spin	

== Home attendance ==
Match	Opponent	Attendance
3	Hobart Hurricanes	34,601
4	Sydney Sixers	32,371
6	Perth Scorchers	34,677
8	Melbourne Renegades	35,112
Total Attendance		136,761
Average Attendance		34,190
