= 2018–19 Brisbane Heat season =

Cricket team season

The 2018–19 Brisbane Heat season was the eighth in the club's history. The team was coached by Daniel Vettori.

== Fixtures ==
=== Match 1 ===
19 December 2018
18:15 (D/N)
Scorecard

(H) Brisbane Heat; 146 (19.4 overs)	v	Adelaide Strikers; 5/147 (19.1 overs)
Chris Lynn 33 (20); Rashid Khan 3/19 (4 overs)		Alex Carey 70 (46); James Pattinson 2/23 (4 overs)

Adelaide Strikers won by 5 wickets
The Gabba, Brisbane
Attendance: 26,932
Umpires: Simon Fry and Paul Wilson
Player of the match: Rashid Khan (Adelaide Strikers)

- Adelaide Strikers won the toss and elected to field.
- Max Bryant (Brisbane Heat) made his T20 debut.
- Mujeeb Ur Rahman (Brisbane Heat) made 27 runs, the highest score by a number 11 batsman in T20's and in the history of BBL.
- Jimmy Peirson and Mujeeb Ur Rahman (Brisbane Heat) made the highest last wicket partnership (of 45) in the history of BBL.

=== Match 5 ===
22 December 2018
18:00 (D/N)
Scorecard

Hobart Hurricanes; 6/159 (19 overs)	v	Brisbane Heat (H); 144 (18.4 overs)
D'Arcy Short 67 (52); Mujeeb Ur Rahman 2/23 (4 overs)		Ben Cutting 58 (32); James Faulkner 3/25 (3.4 overs)

Hobart Hurricanes won by 15 runs
Metricon Stadium, Gold Coast
Attendance: 12,791
Umpires: Phillip Gillespie and John Ward
Player of the match: D'Arcy Short (Hobart Hurricanes)

- Brisbane Heat won the toss and elected to field.
- Match was reduced to 19 overs per side due to rain.

=== Match 15 ===
1 January 2019
13:45
Scorecard

(H) Brisbane Heat; 7/164 (20 overs)	v	Sydney Sixers; 5/165 (19.3 overs)
Chris Lynn 84 (55); Tom Curran 3/25 (4 overs)		Moises Henriques 57 (37); Josh Lalor 2/32 (4 overs)

Sydney Sixers won by 5 wickets
Metricon Stadium, Gold Coast
Attendance: 17,106
Umpires: Phillip Gillespie and Donovan Koch
Player of the match: Chris Lynn (Brisbane Heat)

- Sydney Sixers won the toss and elected to field.
- Justin Avendano (Sydney Sixers) made his T20 debut.

=== Match 21 ===
5 January 2019
18:30 (D/N)
Scorecard

(H) Perth Scorchers; 6/135 (20 overs)	v	Brisbane Heat; 5/139 (18.2 overs)
Ashton Turner 47 (30); Mujeeb Ur Rahman 2/10 (4 overs)		Chris Lynn 33 (34); Nathan Coulter-Nile 3/25 (4 overs)

Brisbane Heat won by 5 wickets
Optus Stadium, Perth
Attendance: 40,511
Umpires: Phillip Gillespie and Tony Wilds
Player of the match: Mujeeb Ur Rahman (Brisbane Heat)

- Brisbane Heat won the toss and elected to field.

=== Match 24 ===
8 January 2019
19:15 (D/N)
Scorecard

Brisbane Heat; 8/186 (20 overs)	v	Sydney Thunder (H); 2/34 (5.3 overs)
Brendon McCullum 56 (35); Jonathan Cook 3/27 (4 overs)		Callum Ferguson 16 (12); James Pattinson 1/6 (2 overs)

Brisbane Heat won by 15 runs (D/L method)
Spotless Stadium, Sydney
Attendance: 11,147
Umpires: Shawn Craig and Greg Davidson
Player of the match: Chris Lynn (Brisbane Heat)

- Sydney Thunder won the toss and elected to field.
- Rain stopped play during Sydney Thunder's innings.

=== Match 26 ===
10 January 2019
18:15 (D/N)
Scorecard

(H) Brisbane Heat; 8/144 (20 overs)	v	Melbourne Renegades; 2/145 (15.4 overs)
Brendon McCullum 50 (47); Usman Shinwari 3/16 (4 overs)		Sam Harper 56* (40); Mujeeb Ur Rahman 1/23 (4 overs)

Melbourne Renegades won by 8 wickets
The Gabba, Brisbane
Attendance: 30,281
Umpires: Geoff Joshua and Simon Lightbody
Player of the match: Sam Harper (Melbourne Renegades)

- Melbourne Renegades won the toss and elected to field.

=== Match 29 ===
13 January 2019
18:35 (D/N)
Scorecard

Brisbane Heat; 4/192 (20 overs)	v	Melbourne Renegades (H); 91 (17.5 overs)
Brendon McCullum 69 (43); Dan Christian 2/24 (4 overs)		Cameron Boyce 25 (21); Brendan Doggett 3/16 (2.5 overs)

Brisbane Heat won by 101 runs
GMHBA Stadium, Geelong
Attendance: 16,008
Umpires: Shawn Craig and Phillip Gillespie
Player of the match: Max Bryant (Brisbane Heat)

- Melbourne Renegades won the toss and elected to field.

=== Match 33 ===
17 January 2019
18:15 (D/N)
Scorecard

Sydney Thunder; 4/186 (20 overs)	v	Brisbane Heat (H); 2/10 (3 overs)
Shane Watson 100 (62); Ben Cutting 2/41 (4 overs)		Chris Lynn 4 (9); Gurinder Sandhu 1/3 (1 over)

No result
The Gabba, Brisbane
Attendance: 26,644
Umpires: Shawn Craig and Donovan Koch

- Sydney Thunder won the toss and elected to bat.
- Jack Prestwidge (Brisbane Heat) made his T20 debut.
- A flood light failure stopped play during Brisbane Heat's innings.

=== Match 36 ===
20 January 2019
19:15 (D/N)
Scorecard

(H) Sydney Sixers; 7/177 (20 overs)	v	Brisbane Heat; 98 (18.1 overs)
James Vince 75 (46); Josh Lalor 5/26 (4 overs)		Ben Cutting 28 (26); Tom Curran 3/16 (4 overs)

Sydney Sixers won by 79 runs
Sydney Cricket Ground, Sydney
Attendance: 14,921
Umpires: Shawn Craig and John Ward
Player of the match: James Vince (Sydney Sixers)

- Brisbane Heat won the toss and elected to field.

=== Match 42 ===
27 January 2019
19:40 (D/N)
Scorecard

(H) Melbourne Stars; 134/8 (20 overs)	v	Brisbane Heat; 129/8 (20 overs)
Marcus Stoinis 43 (29); Ben Cutting 2/10 (2 overs)		Matt Renshaw 45 (43); Marcus Stoinis 4/21 (4 overs)

Melbourne Stars won by 5 runs
Melbourne Cricket Ground, Melbourne
Attendance: 22,231
Umpires: Simon Fry and Geoff Joshua
Player of the match: Marcus Stoinis (Melbourne Stars)

- Brisbane Heat won the toss and elected to field.

=== Match 44 ===
29 January 2019
16:00
Scorecard

Brisbane Heat; 6/145 (20 overs)	v	Hobart Hurricanes (H); 1/146 (14.2 overs)
Alex Ross 62 (35); James Faulkner 2/27 (4 overs); David Moody 2/27 (4 overs)		D'Arcy Short 68* (41); Ben Cutting 1/29 (3 overs)

Hobart Hurricanes won by 9 wickets
Blundstone Arena, Hobart
Attendance: 11,320
Umpires: Sam Nogajski and John Ward
Player of the match: D'Arcy Short (Hobart Hurricanes)

- Hobart Hurricanes won the toss and elected to field.
- Jarrod Freeman (Hobart Hurricanes) made his T20 debut.

=== Match 48 ===
1 February 2019
19:40 (D/N)
Scorecard

Perth Scorchers; 9/128 (20 overs)	v	Brisbane Heat (H); 4/130 (17.3 overs)
Nick Hobson 43 (35); Mujeeb Ur Rahman 3/16 (4 overs)		Chris Lynn 56* (39); Matthew Kelly 2/27 (3 overs)

Brisbane Heat won by 6 wickets
The Gabba, Brisbane
Attendance: 21,254
Umpires: Greg Davidson and Donovan Koch
Player of the match: Mujeeb Ur Rahman (Brisbane Heat)

- Brisbane Heat won the toss and elected to field.
- Matthew Kuhnemann (Brisbane Heat) and Clint Hinchliffe (Perth Scorchers) both made their T20 debuts.
- Josh Lalor (Brisbane Heat) took a hat-trick.
- Chris Lynn (Brisbane Heat) became the leading run-scorer in the Big Bash League with 1,945 runs.

=== Match 53 ===
8 February 2019
19:40 (D/N)
Scorecard

Melbourne Stars; 8/156 (20 overs)	v	Brisbane Heat (H); 0/158 (10 overs)
Marcus Stoinis 81 (51); Josh Lalor 3/43 (4 overs)		Ben Cutting 81* (30)

Brisbane Heat won by 10 wickets
The Gabba, Brisbane
Attendance: 21,391
Umpires: Greg Davidson and Tony Wilds
Player of the match: Ben Cutting (Brisbane Heat)

- Brisbane Heat won the toss and elected to field.

== Ladder ==
Pos	Team	Pld	W	L	NR	Pts	NRR	Qualification
1	Hobart Hurricanes	14	10	4	0	20	0.603	Advanced to semi-finals
2	Melbourne Renegades (C)	14	8	6	0	16	0.173	Advanced to semi-finals
3	Sydney Sixers	14	8	6	0	16	0.047	Advanced to semi-finals
4	Melbourne Stars	14	7	7	0	14	−0.062	Advanced to semi-finals
5	Brisbane Heat	14	6	7	1	13	0.249	
6	Sydney Thunder	14	6	7	1	13	0.000	
7	Adelaide Strikers	14	6	8	0	12	−0.473	
8	Perth Scorchers	14	4	10	0	8	−0.502	

(C) Champions
