= 2017–18 Brisbane Heat season =

Cricket team season

The 2017–18 Brisbane Heat season was the seventh in the club's history. The team was coached by Daniel Vettori.

== Fixtures ==
=== Match 2 ===
20 December 2017
18:40 (D/N)
Scorecard

(H) Brisbane Heat; 7/206 (20 overs)	v	Melbourne Stars; 6/191 (20 overs)
Alex Ross 51 (36); Marcus Stoinis 3/38 (4 overs)		Marcus Stoinis 99 (51); Shadab Khan 2/41 (4 overs)

Brisbane Heat won by 15 runs
The Gabba, Brisbane
Attendance: 27,433
Umpires: Shawn Craig and John Ward
Player of the match: Marcus Stoinis (Melbourne Stars)

- Melbourne Stars won the toss and elected to field.
- Brendan Doggett (Brisbane Heat) made his T20 debut.

=== Match 6 ===
23 December 2017
19:25 (D/N)
Scorecard

Brisbane Heat; 8/132 (20 overs)	v	Melbourne Renegades (H); 3/137 (18.4 overs)
Alex Ross 48 (44); Jack Wildermuth 3/16 (4 overs)		Tom Cooper 52* (44); Shadab Khan 2/17 (4 overs)

Melbourne Renegades won by 7 wickets
Docklands Stadium, Melbourne
Attendance: 20,567
Umpires: John Ward and Paul Wilson
Player of the match: Jack Wildermuth (Melbourne Renegades)

- Melbourne Renegades won the toss and elected to field.

=== Match 8 ===
27 December 2017
18:10 (D/N)
Scorecard

Sydney Thunder; 4/149 (17 overs)	v	Brisbane Heat (H); 4/153 (16.5 overs)
Shane Watson 56 (34); Shadab Khan 2/27 (4 overs)		Joe Burns 45* (35); Mitchell McClenaghan 2/45 (4 overs)

Brisbane Heat won by 6 wickets (D/L)
The Gabba, Brisbane
Attendance: 34,343
Umpires: Gerard Abood and Tony Wilds
Player of the match: Alex Ross (Brisbane Heat)

- Sydney Thunder won the toss and elected to bat.
- Both innings were reduced to 17 overs due to a rain delay, with Brisbane Heat set a target of 151 to win by the D/L method.

=== Match 12 ===
31 December 2017
18:40 (D/N)
Scorecard

(H) Adelaide Strikers; 7/147 (20 overs)	v	Brisbane Heat; 91 (16.2 overs)
Michael Neser 40* (26); Josh Lalor 3/40 (4 overs)		Cameron Gannon 23 (26); Ben Laughlin 3/11 (2.2 overs)

Adelaide Strikers won by 56 runs
Adelaide Oval, Adelaide
Attendance: 46,594
Umpires: Michael Graham-Smith and Geoff Joshua
Player of the match: Michael Neser (Adelaide Strikers)

- Adelaide Strikers won the toss and elected to bat

=== Match 15 ===
2 January 2018
19:10 (D/N)
Scorecard

(H) Melbourne Stars; 7/141 (20 overs)	v	Brisbane Heat; 1/144 (14.4 overs)
Glenn Maxwell 50 (39); Mitchell Swepson 3/14 (4 overs)		Chris Lynn 63* (46); Liam Bowe 1/21 (2 overs)

Brisbane Heat won by 9 wickets
Melbourne Cricket Ground, Melbourne
Attendance: 36,834
Umpires: Michael Graham-Smith and Geoff Joshua
Player of the match: Mitchell Swepson (Brisbane Heat)

- Brisbane Heat won the toss and elected to field

=== Match 18 ===
5 January 2018
18:10 (D/N)
Scorecard

(H) Brisbane Heat; 6/191 (20 overs)	v	Perth Scorchers; 142 (19 overs)
Ben Cutting 46 (20); David Willey 2/40 (4 overs)		Ashton Agar 31 (18); Brendan Doggett 5/35 (4 overs)

Brisbane Heat won by 49 runs
The Gabba, Brisbane
Attendance: 35,564
Umpires: Phillip Gillespie and Tony Wilds
Player of the match: Ben Cutting (Brisbane Heat)

- Perth Scorchers won the toss and elected to field.

=== Match 24 ===
10 January 2018
18:40 (D/N)
Scorecard

Hobart Hurricanes; 4/179 (20 overs)	v	Brisbane Heat (H); 8/176 (20 overs)
D'Arcy Short 122* (69); Ben Cutting 2/27 (4 overs)		Sam Heazlett 45 (33); Cameron Boyce 2/23 (4 overs)

Hobart Hurricanes won by 3 runs
The Gabba, Brisbane
Attendance: 33,017
Umpires: Greg Davidson and Simon Fry
Player of the match: D'Arcy Short (Hobart Hurricanes)

- Hobart Hurricanes won the toss and elected to bat.
- D'Arcy Short (Hobart Hurricanes) scored the highest individual score in a BBL match.

=== Match 29 ===
15 January 2018
19:40 (D/N)
Scorecard

Brisbane Heat; 8/165 (20 overs)	v	Hobart Hurricanes (H); 4/166 (18.2 overs)
Brendon McCullum 51 (38); Jofra Archer 2/32 (4 overs)		D'Arcy Short 59 (49); Joe Burns 1/10 (1 over)

Hobart Hurricanes won by 6 wickets
Bellerive Oval, Hobart
Attendance: 14,873
Umpires: Gerard Abood and Tony Wilds
Player of the match: Dan Christian (Hobart Hurricanes)

- Brisbane Heat won the toss and elected to bat

=== Match 32 ===
18 January 2018
19:40 (D/N)
Scorecard

Brisbane Heat; 73 (16.4 overs)	v	Sydney Sixers (H); 1/74 (10 overs)
Alex Ross 15 (21); Sean Abbott 4/11 (4 overs)		Daniel Hughes 37 (28); Yasir Shah 1/37 (4 overs)

Sydney Sixers won by 9 wickets
Sydney Cricket Ground, Sydney
Attendance: 22,900
Umpires: Michael Graham-Smith and Geoff Joshua
Player of the match: Sean Abbott (Sydney Sixers)

- Sydney Sixers won the toss and elected to field.

=== Match 40 ===
27 January 2018
18:20 (D/N)
Scorecard

Melbourne Renegades; 3/187 (20 overs)	v	Brisbane Heat (H); 161 (19.5 overs)
Tom Cooper 65* (36); Mitchell Swepson 1/27 (4 overs)		Alex Ross 36 (27); Kane Richardson 4/35 (4 overs)

Melbourne Renegades won by 26 runs
The Gabba, Brisbane
Attendance: 34,543
Umpires: Gerard Abood and Phillip Gillespie
Player of the match: Tom Cooper (Melbourne Renegades)

- Brisbane Heat won the toss and elected to field

== Ladder ==
Pos	Team	Pld	W	L	NR	Pts	NRR	Qualification
1	Perth Scorchers	10	8	2	0	16	0.154	Advanced to semi-finals
2	Adelaide Strikers (C)	10	7	3	0	14	0.801	Advanced to semi-finals
3	Melbourne Renegades	10	6	4	0	12	0.297	Advanced to semi-finals
4	Hobart Hurricanes	10	5	5	0	10	−0.291	Advanced to semi-finals
5	Sydney Sixers	10	4	6	0	8	0.331	
6	Sydney Thunder	10	4	6	0	8	−0.039	
7	Brisbane Heat	10	4	6	0	8	−0.437	
8	Melbourne Stars	10	2	8	0	4	−0.926	

(C) Champions
