= Bizzelli =

Bizzelli is a surname. Notable people with the surname include:

- Annibale Bizzelli (1900–1967), Italian composer
- Giovanni Bizzelli (1556–1607 or 1612), Italian painter

== See also ==
- Bizzell
