= List of Perth Scorchers records and statistics =

This is a list of Perth Scorchers records and statistics in the Big Bash League, an Australian cricket series.

== Records ==
=== Team records ===
==== Result summary v. opponent ====
Domestic teams
Opposition	Pld	W	L	T	T+W	T+L	NR	%
Adelaide Strikers	22	12	10	0	0	0	0	54.54
Brisbane Heat	21	14	7	0	0	0	0	66.66
Hobart Hurricanes	19	12	7	0	0	0	0	63.15
Melbourne Renegades	18	15	3	0	0	0	0	83.33
Melbourne Stars	22	13	8	0	0	0	1	59.09
Sydney Sixers	27	16	10	0	1	0	0	59.25
Sydney Thunder	17	8	9	0	0	0	0	47.05
Statistics are correct as of Perth Scorchers v Brisbane Heat at Perth, Big Bash League final, 4 February 2023.

International teams
Opposition	Pld	W	L	T	T+W	T+L	NR	%
Auckland	1	1	0	0	0	0	0	100.00
Chennai Super Kings	1	0	1	0	0	0	0	0
Delhi Daredevils	1	0	1	0	0	0	0	0
Dolphins	1	1	0	0	0	0	0	100.00
Kolkata Knight Riders	2	0	1	0	0	0	1	0
Lahore Lions	1	1	0	0	0	0	0	100.00
Lions	1	0	0	0	0	0	1	-
Mumbai Indians	1	0	1	0	0	0	0	0
Otago	1	0	1	0	0	0	0	0
Rajasthan Royals	1	0	1	0	0	0	0	0
Titans	1	0	1	0	0	0	0	0

=== Batting records ===
==== Most runs ====
Batsman	Years	mat	inns	NO	Runs	HS	Average	Strike rate
Mitchell Marsh	2011–2022	77	76	24	2107	100*	40.51	133.43
Ashton Turner	2013-2023	124	108	26	2085	84*	25.42	143.49
Cameron Bancroft	2014-2023	69	63	15	1617	95*	33.68	124.09
Shaun Marsh	2011–2019	40	40	8	1519	99*	47.46	127.21
Josh Inglis	2017-2023	54	49	8	1509	79	31.36	125.16
Statistics are correct as of Perth Scorchers v Brisbane Heat at Perth, Big Bash League Final, 4 February 2023.
