= Bizzell =

Bizzell is a surname. Notable people with the surname include:

- Clint Bizzell (born 1976), Australian rules footballer
- Graham Bizzell (1941–2014), Australian cricketer
- Jim Bob Bizzell (born 1985), American Paralympic athlete
- Patricia Bizzell PhD, Professor of English and Chairperson of the English Department at College of the Holy Cross, USA
- William Bizzell (1876–1944), fifth president of the University of Oklahoma and president of Agricultural and Mechanical College of Texas

== See also ==
- Bizzell Memorial Library, located at the University of Oklahoma in Norman, Oklahoma
