= Peter Forrest =

Australian cricketer

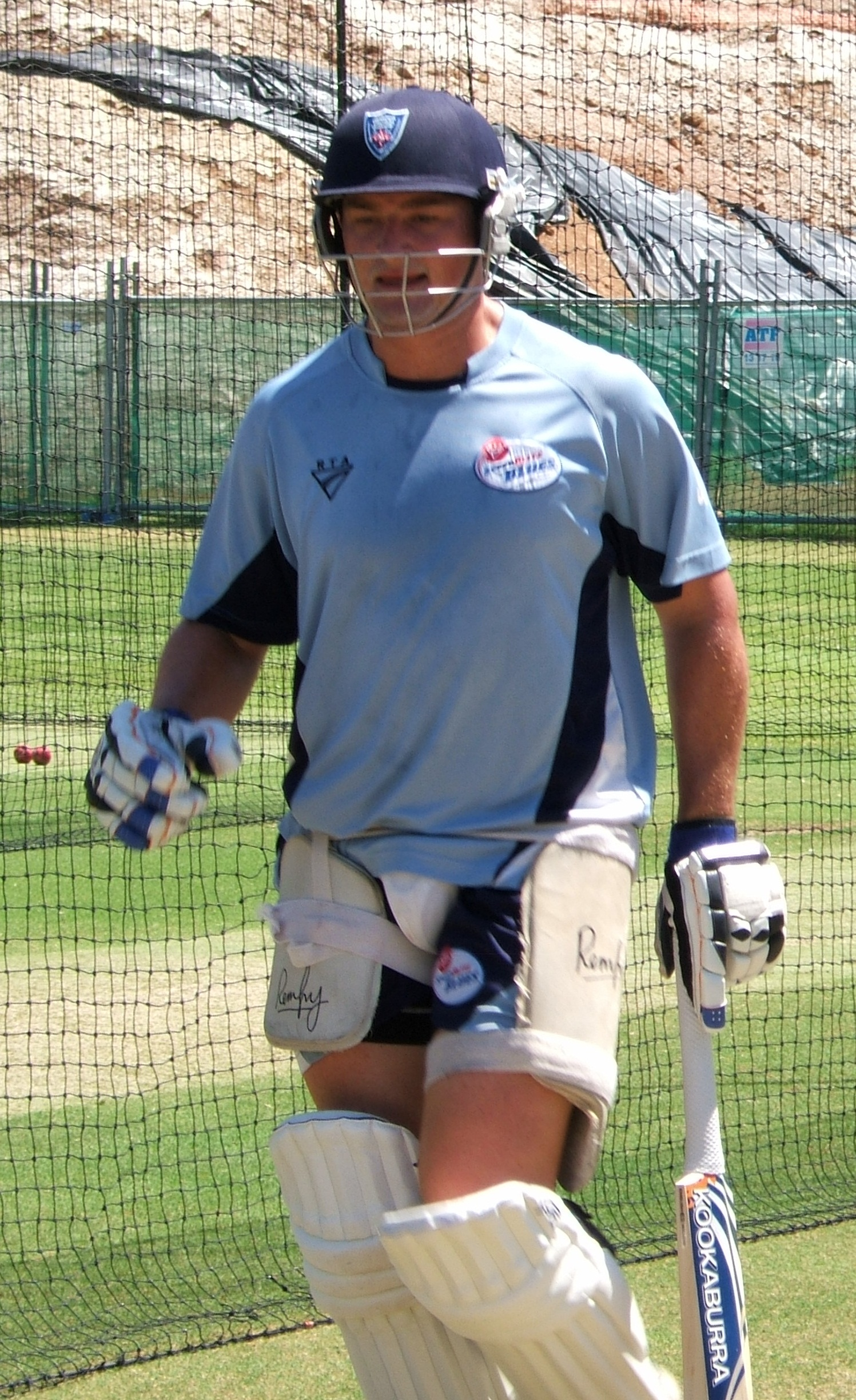

Personal information
- Full name: Peter James Forrest
- Born: 15 November 1985 (age 41); Windsor, New South Wales, Australia
- Nickname: Foz
- Height: 1.80 m (5 ft 11 in)
- Batting: Right-handed
- Bowling: Right-arm medium
- Role: Batsman

International information
- National side: Australia
- ODI debut (cap 193): 12 February 2012 v India
- Last ODI: 10 July 2012 v England
- ODI shirt no.: 66

Domestic team information
- Years: Team
- 2006/07–2010/11: New South Wales
- 2011/12–2016/17: Queensland
- 2011/12–2015/16: Brisbane Heat

Career statistics
Competition	ODI	FC	LA	T20
Matches	15	80	59	32
Runs scored	368	4,251	1,354	575
Batting average	26.28	33.47	26.54	23.00
100s/50s	1/3	10/18	1/9	0/3
Top score	104	177	104	62*
Balls bowled	–	105	12	-
Wickets	–	1	0	–
Bowling average	–	82.00	–	–
5 wickets in innings	–	0	–	–
10 wickets in match	–	0	–	–
Best bowling	–	1/7	–	–
Catches/stumpings	4/–	94/–	28/–	17/–
- Source: CricInfo, 5 October 2021

Peter James Forrest (born 15 November 1985) is an Australian former professional cricketer who played for New South Wales, Queensland and Brisbane Heat. He played in 15 One Day Internationals (ODIs) for the Australian national cricket team in 2012.

== Domestic career ==
With a rookie contract in the 2006–07 season, Forrest made his first-class cricket debut for New South Wales against Queensland on 1 March 2007. After solid performances in early Pura Cup games, outstanding results in the Cricket Australia Cup and consistency for Hawkesbury in Grade Cricket, Forrest received his first full contract for New South Wales ahead of the 2007–08 season.

Forrest made his List A cricket debut against Western Australia on 12 October 2007

In November 2007, Forrest scored his first first-class century against Tasmania at the Sydney Cricket Ground, hitting 177 runs including 21 fours and two sixes.

In February 2010 it was announced that Forrest would be the professional for Lancashire League side Nelson Cricket Club for the 2010 season. Forrest moved from New South Wales to the Queensland Bulls from the 2011–12 Australian season.

== International career ==
In January 2012, Forrest was selected in the 14-man One Day International squad for Australia, to take part in the tri-series against India and Sri Lanka. This came after impressive performances with both Queensland and Brisbane's Big Bash League side the Brisbane Heat, which he captained for the majority of the tournament in injured skipper James Hopes' place.

In February 2012, Forrest made his ODI debut against India at the Adelaide Oval. In his debut innings he scored 66 runs off 83 balls. He hit his second ODI fifty against India on 19 February 2012 at The Gabba, scoring 52 runs off 71 balls. He scored his only One Day international century against Sri Lanka at the Bellerive Oval in Hobart on 24 February 2012.

Sporting positions
Preceded by Robin Peterson	Nelson Cricket Club professional 2010	Succeeded by Incumbent
