= Brisbane Heat =

Cricket team

- Nickname: Heat
- League: Big Bash League
- Association: Cricket Australia

Personnel
- Captain: Usman Khawaja
- Coach: James Hopes
- Owner: Queensland Cricket

Team information
- City: Brisbane, Queensland
- Colours: Teal
- Founded: 2011; 15 years ago
- Home ground: The Gabba
- Capacity: 37,000

History
- Big Bash League wins: 2 (BBL |02, BBL |13)
- Official website: brisbaneheat.com.au
T20I kit

The Brisbane Heat are an Australian men's professional franchise cricket team, competing in Australia's domestic Twenty20 (T20) cricket competition, the Big Bash League (BBL). The Heat are the successors of the Queensland Bulls who played in the now-defunct KFC Twenty20 Big Bash. The Heat wear a teal uniform and are based in Brisbane in the Australian state of Queensland. Their home ground is the Brisbane Cricket Ground, commonly known as The Gabba. The inaugural coach was Darren Lehmann who was the assistant to head coach Wade Seccombe, who then stepped down after winning the BBL|13 title. Leading up to the start of the BBL|14 season, Johan Botha was appointed the Heat's head coach. The Heat's inaugural captain was Australian ODI batter Peter Forrest. Internationals Usman Khawaja, Chris Lynn, Brendon McCullum, Colin Munro and Daniel Vettori have also captained the team.

== History ==
=== Big Bash League 2011/12 ===
After losing their first four matches of the season, the Heat finished strong, winning their final three games. They finished in 5th place, one place below the semi-final qualification. James Hopes was supposed to captain the team, but missed the whole tournament due to injury. Peter Forrest led the team instead. Brendon McCullum missed some matches while playing in the HRV Cup in New Zealand simultaneously. Fellow New Zealander Daniel Vettori missed a few games because of injury.

Date	Opponent	Venue	Result
16 December 2011	Sydney Sixers	Sydney Cricket Ground	Lost by 7 wickets, MoM-Brad Haddin 76(59)
20 December 2011	Melbourne Stars	The Gabba	Lost by 8 runs
29 December 2011	Perth Scorchers	WACA Ground	Lost by 10 runs
3 January 2012	Adelaide Strikers	The Gabba	Lost by 31 runs
6 January 2012	Hobart Hurricanes	The Gabba	Won by 3 runs, MoM- Matthew Hayden 76 (51)
12 January 2012	Melbourne Renegades	Etihad Stadium	Won by 12 runs, MoM- Daniel Vettori 40 (25) and 0/27 (4 Overs)
17 January 2012	Sydney Thunder	The Gabba	Won by 91 runs, MoM- Daniel Christian 75* (47) and 1/17 (4 Overs)
Overall Record of 3–4 in BBL|01 Failed to make Semifinals, ended 5/8

=== Big Bash League 2012/13 ===
Heat won four matches and lost four matches in the league stage, sneaking into the semi-finals thanks to net run-rate. In the semi-final, the Heat met the Renegades, who finished the league in first place. Luke Pomersbach scored 112* to help the Heat upset the Renegades.

=== Final ===
Brisbane Heat defeated the Perth Scorchers in the 2012/13 Big Bash League final. The match was played at the WACA Ground on 19 January 2013.

Captain James Hopes was unable to play due to injury, so Chris Hartley led the team instead and won the toss, choosing to bat first. Kishal Majmudar top scored for Brisbane with 43 runs off 27 balls, in a total of 167. Jason Behrendorff took 2 wickets for the Scorchers.

In reply, Perth Scorchers scored 133 for the loss of nine wickets from their 20 overs, losing by 34 runs. Adam Voges was the highest scorer with 49 runs from 32 deliveries. Barbadian Kemar Roach took 3 wickets for 18 runs. Nathan Hauritz was named man of the match after bowling three overs for 11 runs and taking three catches.

Date	Opponent	Venue	Result
9 December 2012	Hobart Hurricanes	The Gabba	Lost by 8 wickets
13 December 2012	Adelaide Strikers	Adelaide Oval	Won by 3 wickets, MoM- Luke Pomersbach 65 (39)
18 December 2012	Perth Scorchers	The Gabba	Lost by 9 wickets (D/L)
22 December 2012	Melbourne Renegades	Etihad Stadium	Lost by 6 wickets, MoM- Ben Cutting 2/12 (4 Overs)
28 December 2012	Sydney Thunder	Stadium Australia	Won by 5 wickets, MoM- Daniel Christian 5/26 (4 overs)
3 January 2013	Melbourne Stars	The Gabba	Won by 24 runs, MoM- James Hopes 49 (40) and 3/28 (4 Overs)
7 January 2013	Sydney Sixers	The Gabba	Lost by 5 wickets
12 January 2013	Hobart Hurricanes	Bellerive Oval	Won by 8 wickets, MoM- Luke Pomersbach 82 (42)
Finals Series
15 January 2013	Melbourne Renegades	Etihad Stadium	Won by 15 runs, MoM- Luke Pomersbach 112* (70)
19 January 2013	Perth Scorchers	WACA Ground	Won by 34 runs, MoM- Nathan Hauritz 0/11 (3 Overs) and 3 catches
Overall Record of 6–4 in BBL|02 Big Bash League Champions (1/8)

=== Big Bash League 2013/14 ===
The team started well, winning their first game against the Perth Scorchers, but then lost the next three games. However, the Heat finished well, winning two of their last three games. They lost the Do-or-die match against Hobart Hurricanes by 40 runs, so giving the Hurricanes the last qualifying spot, leaving the Heat to finish in 5th place. There were good signs for the Heat as Cameron Gannon was the leading wicket-taker in the Big Bash, snaring 18 wickets at an average of less than 12 – with best bowling of 4–10. Daniel Vettori was economical with the ball, going for just above six an over and picking up 7 wickets. Chris Lynn was the Heat's highest run scorer, with 198 runs in the season, closely followed by Dan Christian who made 186 runs at an average of 46.5.

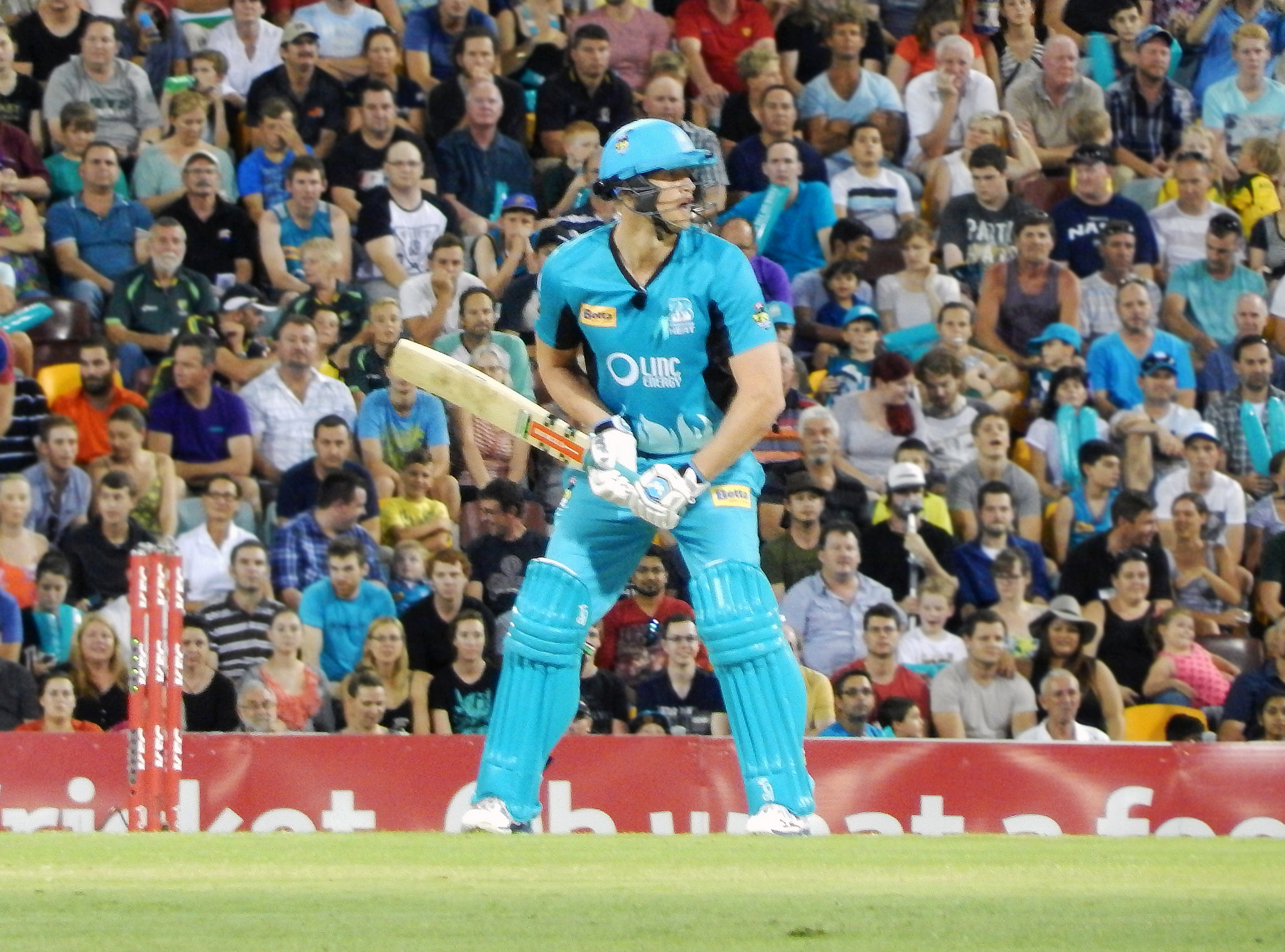
28.12.2014 at the Gabba, Brisbane.

Date	Opponent	Venue	Result
22 December 2013	Perth Scorchers	The Gabba	Won by 3 wickets, MoM- Chris Lynn 81 (53)
28 December 2013	Hobart Hurricanes	The Gabba	Lost by 3 wickets
30 December 2013	Melbourne Renegades	Etihad Stadium	Lost by 57 runs
2 January 2014	Sydney Sixers	The Gabba	Lost by 4 runs
8 January 2014	Sydney Thunder	Stadium Australia	Won by 48 runs, MoM- Chris Lynn 56 (35)
11 January 2014	Melbourne Stars	The Gabba	Lost by 3 wickets
18 January 2014	Adelaide Strikers	Adelaide Oval	Won by 32 runs, MoM- Daniel Vettori 2/10 (4 Overs)
23 January 2014	Hobart Hurricanes	Bellerive Oval	Lost by 40 runs
Overall Record of 3–5 in BBL|03 Failed to make Semifinals, ended 5/8

=== Big Bash League 2014/15 ===
Brisbane Heat lost their first match against Thunder but bounced back to defeat the Melbourne Stars by one run in a thrilling contest. The Heat then lost five consecutive games but beat the Hurricanes by 18 runs in their final match of the season. Brisbane Heat finished in last place, winning only two of eight games. Consequently, Stuart Law resigned as coach and James Hopes as captain. Brisbane Heat won the wooden spoon off the Sydney Thunder, who finished last in each of the first 3 seasons of the BBL.

Date	Opponent	Venue	Result
21 December 2014	Sydney Thunder	ANZ Stadium	Lost by 56 runs
28 December 2014	Melbourne Stars	The Gabba	Won by 1 run, MoM- Ryan Duffield 3/28 (4 overs)
2 January 2015	Hobart Hurricanes	Blundstone Arena	Lost by 6 wickets
4 January 2015	Adelaide Strikers	The Gabba	Lost by 5 wickets
8 January 2015	Perth Scorchers	#TheFurnace	Lost by 8 wickets
11 January 2015	Sydney Sixers	The Gabba	Lost by 6 wickets
13 January 2015	Melbourne Renegades	Etihad Stadium	Lost by 5 wickets
15 January 2015	Hobart Hurricanes	The Gabba	Won by 18 runs, MoM- Chris Lynn 81 (35)
Overall Record of 2–6 in BBL|04 Failed to make Semifinals, ended 8/8

=== Big Bash League 2015/16 ===
After retiring from playing, Daniel Vettori signed a 3-year contract to be coach of the franchise. Chris Lynn became the captain for the tournament following the resignation of James Hopes. The Heat signed Josh Lalor, Andrew Fekete (cricketer), Alex Doolan, as well as snapping up West Indian pair Samuel Badree and Lendl Simmons. Rookies Jack Wildermuth and Mitchell Swepson also joined the Heat. They lost their first four matches, before beating the Thunder. The Heat then lost to Strikers, but finished well, beating the Sixers and Stars in their last two matches. The Heat finished 6th in the table with 3 wins and 5 losses. Captain Chris Lynn was the tournament's leading run-scorer and was also named Player of the Tournament. He smashed 378 runs in 8 matches, including a century against Hobart Hurricanes in a losing cause.

Date	Opponent	Venue	Result
19 December 2015	Melbourne Renegades	The Gabba	Lost by 7 wickets
22 December 2015	Hobart Hurricanes	Blundstone Arena	Lost by 20 runs
26 December 2015	Perth Scorchers	#The Furnace	Lost by 9 wickets
29 December 2015	Hobart Hurricanes	The Gabba	Lost by 15 runs, MoM- Chris Lynn 101(51)
3 January 2016	Sydney Thunder	The Gabba	Won by 6 wickets, MoM- Chris Lynn 75 (32)
8 January 2016	Adelaide Strikers	The Gabba	Lost by 8 wickets
10 January 2016	Sydney Sixers	Sydney Cricket Ground	Won by 6 runs, MoM- Joe Burns 60(51)
14 January 2016	Melbourne Stars	Melbourne Cricket Ground	Won by 56 runs, MoM- Samuel Badree 5/22(4)
Overall Record of 3–5 in BBL|05 Failed to make Semifinals, ended 6/8

=== Big Bash League 2016/17 ===
Following Brendon McCullum's international retirement, he returned to the Heat to captain the team. He took no part in the previous season due to BBL coinciding with the final matches of his international career. James Hopes retired from cricket. Heat signed local player Marnus Labuschagne and Alex Ross from Adelaide Strikers. English fast bowler Tymal Mills joined as an international player. The Heat started well, winning their first three matches, but then lost to the Sixers by 3 wickets. The Heat won 2 of their next 3 matches. They lost their last game of the season to the Renegades in a thrilling 1-run loss. The Heat finished 2nd in the table with 5 wins and 3 losses. This was their best performance in the league stage. In a thrilling semi-final, they lost to the Sydney Sixers in a super over. Chris Lynn was again named Player of the Tournament, after scoring 305 runs in 6 matches at an average of 154.5.

Date	Opponent	Venue	Result
21 December 2016	Adelaide Strikers	Adelaide Oval	Won by 10 runs, MoM- Brendon McCullum 42(21)
28 December 2016	Sydney Thunder	Spotless Stadium	Won by 3 wickets, MoM- Chris Lynn 85* (48)
30 December 2016	Hobart Hurricanes	The Gabba	Won by 7 wickets, MoM- Chris Lynn 84*(50)
3 January 2017	Sydney Sixers	The Gabba	Lost by 3 wickets
5 January 2017	Perth Scorchers	#The Furnace	Won by 9 wickets, MoM- Chris Lynn 98*(49)
11 January 2017	Perth Scorchers	The Gabba	Lost by 29 runs
17 January 2017	Melbourne Stars	Melbourne Cricket Ground	Won by 7 wickets, MoM- Mitchell Swepson 2/14(4)
20 January 2017	Melbourne Renegades	Etihad Stadium	Lost by 1 run
Finals Series
25 January 2017	Sydney Sixers	The Gabba	Match tied, Lost in the super over
Overall Record of 5–4 in BBL|06 Lost in the semi-final (3/8)

=== Big Bash League 2017-18 ===
The Heat signed Test opener Matt Renshaw. Pakistani leg break bowler Shadab Khan was signed before the season as an international player, and Yasir Shah was later signed as his replacement. The Heat started off well by defeating Melbourne Stars but lost to Renegades in the next match. They won one of their next two matches and then beat the Stars and Scorchers. However, the Brisbane Heat lost their four remaining matches including a Do-or-die last match against the Renegades, ending their season.

Date	Opponent	Venue	Result
20 December 2017	Melbourne Stars	The Gabba	Won by 15 runs
23 December 2017	Melbourne Renegades	Etihad Stadium	Lost by 7 wickets
27 December 2017	Sydney Thunder	The Gabba	Won by 6 wickets(D/L), MoM- Alex Ross 25*(9)
31 December 2017	Adelaide Strikers	Adelaide Oval	Lost by 56 runs
2 January 2018	Melbourne Stars	Melbourne Cricket Ground	Won by 8 wickets, MoM- Mitchell Swepson 3/14(4)
5 January 2018	Perth Scorchers	The Gabba	Won by 49 runs, MoM- Ben Cutting 46(20),2-0-14-0
10 January 2018	Hobart Hurricanes	The Gabba	Lost by 3 runs
15 January 2018	Hobart Hurricanes	Bellerive Oval	Lost by 6 wickets
18 January 2018	Sydney Sixers	Sydney Cricket Ground	Lost by 9 wickets
27 January 2018	Melbourne Renegades	The Gabba	Lost by 27 runs
Overall Record of 4–6 in BBL|07 Failed to make Semifinals, ended 7/8

=== Big Bash League 2018-19 ===
The Heat signed Australian fast bowler James Pattinson and Afghan off-spinner Mujeeb Ur Rahman. Youth signings included Max Bryant and Jack Prestwidge. The Heat faced Adelaide Strikers in their first game of the season and lost by 6 wickets. They lost their next two matches against Hurricanes and Sixers but then beat the Scorchers and the Thunder. The next two matches were against the Renegades, the Heat lost the first but won the second. The next match against the Thunder was abandoned after a power cut. Heat lost their next three matches, but won their last three matches. The Heat finished fifth in the standings with 6 wins and 7 losses with one match abandoned. After the season, Brendon McCullum announced his retirement from the BBL.

Date	Opponent	Venue	Result
19 December 2018	Adelaide Strikers	The Gabba	Lost by 5 wickets
22 December 2018	Hobart Hurricanes	Metricon Stadium	Lost by 15 runs
1 January 2019	Sydney Sixers	The Gabba	Lost by 5 wickets, MoM- Chris Lynn 84(55)
5 January 2019	Perth Scorchers	Optus Stadium	Won by 5 wickets, MoM- (Afghanistan) Mujeeb Ur Rahman 2/10(4)
8 January 2019	Sydney Thunder	Sydney Showground Stadium	Won by 15 runs(D/L), MoM- Chris Lynn 54(30)
10 January 2019	Melbourne Renegades	The Gabba	Lost by 8 wickets
13 January 2019	Melbourne Renegades	GMHBA Stadium	Won by 101 runs, MoM- Max Bryant 44(24)
17 January 2019	Sydney Thunder	The Gabba	No result
20 January 2019	Sydney Sixers	Sydney Cricket Ground	Lost by 79 runs
27 January 2019	Melbourne Stars	Melbourne Cricket Ground	Lost by 5 runs
29 January 2019	Hobart Hurricanes	The Gabba	Lost by 9 wickets
1 February 2019	Perth Scorchers	The Gabba	Won by 6 wickets, MoM- (Afghanistan) Mujeeb Ur Rahman 3/16(4)
3 February 2019	Adelaide Strikers	Adelaide Oval	Won by 6 wickets, MoM- Matt Renshaw 90*(50)
8 February 2019	Melbourne Stars	The Gabba	Won by 10 wickets, MoM- Ben Cutting 3-0-19-0,81*(30)
Overall Record of 6–7 in BBL|08 Failed to make Semifinals, ended 5/8

=== Big Bash League 2019-20 ===
Before the season started Brendon McCullum retired and Daniel Vettori resigned as coach. Darren Lehmann re-joined the team as the Head Coach. In BBL|02, he guided the Heat to their maiden BBL Title. The Heat signed AB de Villiers, as well as Afghan left-arm wrist spinner Zahir Khan and young English opener Tom Banton. In the season opener, the Heat lost to the Thunder by 29 runs and then lost the next match to the Stars by 22 runs. In the third match of the season, the Heat beat the Sixers by 48 runs, with Chris Lynn smashing 94 off 35 deliveries, including 11 sixes. They then lost to the Scorchers by 40 runs. They won their next three matches, including a match against the Thunder where Banton hit Arjun Nair for five consecutive sixes.

After losing to the Scorchers by 34 runs, the Heat won their next match against the Strikers by 6 wickets, where AB de Villiers made his Big Bash debut. The ghosts of BBL|07 returned, as the Heat lost their next three matches. In the second of these defeats, the Heat collapsed against the Renegades, losing 10 wickets for 36 runs in 55 balls. A 71-run victory over the Stars, meant the Heat could qualify for the playoffs by beating the Renegades in their last match. However, they lost by 7 wickets with Jack Prestwidge dropping some important opportunities, and so were eliminated.

Date	Opponent	Venue	Result
17 December 2019	Sydney Thunder	The Gabba	Lost by 29 runs
20 December 2019	Melbourne Stars	Metricon Stadium	Lost by 22 runs
22 December 2019	Sydney Sixers	Sydney Cricket Ground	Won by 48 runs, MoM- Chris Lynn 94(35)
1 January 2020	Perth Scorchers	Metricon Stadium	Lost by 40 runs
3 January 2020	Hobart Hurricanes	Blundstone Arena	Won by 31 runs, MoM- Chris Lynn 88(55)
6 January 2020	Sydney Thunder	Sydney Showground Stadium	Won by 16 runs (D/L), MoM- Tom Banton 56(19)
9 January 2020	Hobart Hurricanes	The Gabba	Won by 5 wickets, MoM- Ben Cutting 2-0-12-1,43*(29)
11 January 2020	Perth Scorchers	Optus Stadium	Lost by 34 runs
14 January 2020	Adelaide Strikers	The Gabba	Won by 6 wickets, MoM- James Pattinson 4-0-33-5
17 January 2020	Adelaide Strikers	Adelaide Oval	Lost by 10 wickets
19 January 2020	Melbourne Renegades	The Gabba	Lost by 44 runs
23 January 2020	Sydney Sixers	The Gabba	Lost by 8 wickets
25 January 2020	Melbourne Stars	Adelaide Oval	Won by 71 runs, MoM- AB de Villiers 71(37)
27 January 2020	Melbourne Renegades	The Gabba	Lost by 7 wickets
Overall Record of 6–8 in BBL|09 Failed to make Semifinals, ended 7/8

=== Big Bash League 2020-21 (BBL|10) ===
Before the season, Jack Wildermuth re-joined Heat and Tom Cooper was signed by the Heat. Morné Morkel joined the club as a local player after gaining permanent residency in Australia. Overseas signings included Lewis Gregory and Dan Lawrence. Local Signings included James Bazley, a former Rookie player in BBL|04, who joined the Heat after 6 seasons, this time having a full contract. Ben Cutting, Matt Renshaw, James Pattinson, Josh Lalor and Jack Prestwidge left the club. Tom Banton left due to bio-bubble fatigue and was later replaced by Joe Denly.

Date	Opponent	Venue	Result
11 December 2020	Melbourne Stars	Manuka Oval	Lost by 6 wickets
14 December 2020	Sydney Thunder	Manuka Oval	Lost by 4 wickets
23 December 2020	Adelaide Strikers	The Gabba	Lost by 2 runs, MoM- Jimmy Peirson 69*(36)
27 December 2020	Hobart Hurricanes	The Gabba	Won by 4 wickets, MoM- Lewis Gregory 3/22(4)
30 December 2020	Hobart Hurricanes	The Gabba	Lost by 1 run, MoM- (Afghanistan) Mujeeb Ur Rahman 5/15(4)
2 January 2021	Sydney Sixers	The Gabba	Won by 4 wickets, MoM- Mark Steketee 4/33(4)
4 January 2021	Sydney Thunder	The Gabba	Won by 5 wickets, MoM- Joe Burns 52(38)
7 January 2021	Melbourne Stars	Metricon Stadium	Won by 18 runs (D/L), MoM- Chris Lynn 48(23)
10 January 2021	Sydney Sixers	Metricon Stadium	Lost by 3 wickets
14 January 2021	Melbourne Renegades	Manuka Oval	Won by 5 wickets, MoM- Joe Burns 31*(15)
19 January 2021	Perth Scorchers	Marvel Stadium	Lost by 59 runs
21 January 2021	Adelaide Strikers	Adelaide Oval	Lost by 82 runs
23 January 2021	Melbourne Renegades	Marvel Stadium	Won by 26 runs, MoM- Marnus Labuschagne 49(31), 1/10(2)
26 January 2021	Perth Scorchers	Adelaide Oval	Won by 6 runs, MoM- Marnus Labuschagne 46(38), 3/35(4)
Finals Series
29 January 2021	Adelaide Strikers	The Gabba	Won by 6 wickets, MoM- Jimmy Peirson 47*(44)
31 January 2021	Sydney Thunder	Manuka Oval	Won by 7 wickets, MoM- Sam Heazlett 74*(49)
4 February 2021	Perth Scorchers	Adelaide Oval	Lost by 49 runs (D/L)
Overall Record of 9–8 in BBL|10 Lost in The Challenger (3/8)

=== Big Bash League 2021-22 ===
Brisbane Heat finished 7th and missed the finals for the fourth time in five years. The team was heavily hit by COVID-19 and was forced to field a team almost completely devoid of its squad.

== Season summaries ==
Chart of yearly table positions for Brisbane Heat in BBL

Season	W–L	Pos.	Finals	Coach	Captain	Most Runs	Most Wickets	Most Valuable Player	Refs
2011–12	3–4	5th	DNQ	Darren Lehmann	James Hopes (Note: Peter Forrest stood in as acting captain for six games.)	Matthew Hayden – 207	Alister McDermott – 9	–	
2012–13	4–4	4th	C	Darren Lehmann	James Hopes (Note: Chris Hartley stood in as acting captain for two games.)	Luke Pomersbach – 397	Ben Cutting – 13	–	
2013–14	3–5	5th	DNQ	Stuart Law	James Hopes (Note: Daniel Vettori stood in as acting captain for one game.)	Chris Lynn – 198	Cameron Gannon – 18*	–	
2014–15	2–6	8th	DNQ	Stuart Law	James Hopes	Chris Lynn – 243	Dan Christian – 6	–	
2015–16	3–5	6th	DNQ	Daniel Vettori	Chris Lynn	Chris Lynn – 378*	Samuel Badree – 9	Chris Lynn*	
2016–17	5–3	2nd	SF	Daniel Vettori	Brendon McCullum	Brendon McCullum – 323	Mark Steketee – 15	Chris Lynn	
2017–18	4–6	7th	DNQ	Daniel Vettori	Brendon McCullum	Brendon McCullum – 248	Mark Steketee – 10	Yasir Shah	
2018–19	6–7	5th	DNQ	Daniel Vettori	Chris Lynn	Chris Lynn – 385	Josh Lalor – 20	Mujeeb Ur Rahman	
2019–20	6–8	7th	DNQ	Darren Lehmann	Chris Lynn	Chris Lynn – 387	Ben Laughlin – 15	Matt Renshaw	
2020–21	7–7	4th	CF	Darren Lehmann	Chris Lynn (Note: Jimmy Peirson stood in as acting captain for five games.)	Chris Lynn – 458	Mark Steketee – 24	Chris Lynn	
2021–22	3–11	7th	DNQ	Wade Seccombe	Jimmy Peirson (Note: Tom Cooper and Chris Lynn both stood in as acting captain for two games each.)	Ben Duckett – 302	James Bazley and Mark Steketee – 12	Ben Duckett	
2022–23	6–7	5th	RU	Wade Seccombe	Usman Khawaja (Note: Jimmy Peirson stood in as acting captain for ten games.)	Jimmy Peirson – 334	Michael Neser – 26	Michael Neser	
2023–24	7–1*	1st*	C	Wade Seccombe	Usman Khawaja (Note: Colin Munro and Nathan McSweeney stood in as acting captain for seven and four games respectively.)	Josh Brown – 366	Xavier Bartlett – 20*	Xavier Bartlett	
2024–25	3–6	7th	DNQ	Johan Botha	Usman Khawaja (Note: Colin Munro and Mitchell Swepson stood in as acting captain for seven and two games respectively.)	Matt Renshaw – 280	Spencer Johnson – 13	Nathan McSweeney	
2025–26	5–5	5th	DNQ	Johan Botha	Usman Khawaja (Note: Nathan McSweeney and Xavier Bartlett stood in as acting captain for four and three games respectively.)	Matt Renshaw – 324	Xavier Bartlett – 15	Matthew Kuhnemann	

Legend
DNQ	Did not qualify	SF	Semi-finalists	*	Led the league
EF	Lost the Eliminator	RU	Runners-up	^	League record
KF	Lost the Knockout	CF	Lost the Challenger	C	Champions

== Captaincy records ==
There have been 14 captains in the Heat's history, including matches featuring an acting captain.

Captain	Span	M	Won	Lost	Tied	NR	W–L%
Peter Forrest	2011–12	6	3	3	0	0	50
James Hopes	2011–15	28	9	18	0	1	33.33
Chris Hartley	2013	2	2	0	0	0	100
Daniel Vettori	2013	1	0	1	0	0	0
Chris Lynn	2015–22	50	21	28	0	1	42.86
Brendon McCullum	2016–18	18	8	10	0	0	44.44
Joe Burns	2017	1	1	0	0	0	100
Jimmy Peirson	2020–23	25	9	15	0	1	36
Tom Cooper	2022	2	0	2	0	0	0
Usman Khawaja	2023–26	14	10	4	0	0	71.43
Colin Munro	2023–24	15	8	4	0	3	66.67
Nathan McSweeney	2024–26	8	4	4	0	0	50
Mitch Swepson	2024-25	2	1	1	0	0	50
Xavier Bartlett	2025	3	1	2	0	0	33.33

== Home grounds ==
Venue	Games hosted by season															
Venue	01	02	03	04	05	06	07	08	09	10	11	12	13	14	15	Total
People First Stadium	0	0	0	0	0	0	0	2	2	2	1	1	2	0	0	10
Cazalys Stadium	0	0	0	0	0	0	0	0	0	0	0	1	0	0	0	1
The Gabba	4	4	4	4	4	5	5	5	5	6	5	5	5	5	5	71

== Current squad ==
The squad of the Brisbane Heat for the 2026–27 Big Bash League season as of 20 October 2026.

- Players with international caps are listed in **bold**.

No.	Name	Nat.	Birth Date	Batting Style	Bowling Style	Additional Info.
Batters
17	Max Bryant	Australia	10 March 1999 (age 27)	Right-handed	Right-arm medium	
22	Lachlan Hearne	Australia	19 December 2000 (age 25)	Left-handed	Right-arm off spin	
70	**Bevon Jacobs**	New Zealand	6 May 2002 (age 24)	Right-handed	Right-arm medium	International Replacement Player
1	**Usman Khawaja**	Australia	18 December 1986 (age 39)	Left-handed	Right-arm off spin	
38	**Nathan McSweeney**	Australia	8 March 1999 (age 27)	Right-handed	Right-arm off spin	
77	**Matt Renshaw**	Australia	28 March 1996 (age 30)	Left-handed	Right-arm off spin	
33	**Tim Robinson**	New Zealand	28 April 2002 (age 24)	Right-handed	Right-arm medium	International Signing
23	Hugh Weibgen	Australia	28 October 2004 (age 22)	Right-handed	Right-arm off spin	
All-rounders
59	**Tom Curran**	England	12 March 1995 (age 31)	Right-handed	Right-arm fast-medium	International Signing
20	**Michael Neser**	Australia	29 March 1990 (age 36)	Right-handed	Right-arm medium-fast	
24	**Jack Wildermuth**	Australia	1 September 1993 (age 33)	Right-handed	Right-arm medium-fast	
Wicket-keepers
59	Jimmy Peirson	Australia	13 October 1992 (age 34)	Right-handed	—N/a	
Bowlers
19	**Xavier Bartlett**	Australia	17 December 1998 (age 27)	Right-handed	Right-arm fast-medium	
45	**Spencer Johnson**	Australia	16 December 1995 (age 30)	Left-handed	Left-arm fast	
30	**Matt Kuhnemann**	Australia	20 September 1996 (age 30)	Left-handed	Slow left-arm orthodox	
15	Callum Vidler	Australia	14 October 2005 (age 21)	Right-handed	Right-arm medium	

== Players ==
=== Australian representatives ===
The following is a list of cricketers who have played for the Heat after making their debut in the national men's team (the period they spent as both a Heat squad member and an Australian-capped player is in brackets):

- Dan Christian (BBL|01–04)
- Ryan Harris (BBL|01–03)
- Nathan Hauritz (BBL|01–03)
- Matthew Hayden (BBL|01)
- James Hopes (BBL|01–05)
- Ben Cutting (BBL|02–09)
- Peter Forrest (BBL|02–05)
- Luke Pomersbach (BBL|02–03)
- Shane Watson (BBL|02)
- Joe Burns (BBL|04–10)
- Chris Lynn (BBL|04–11)
- Nathan Reardon (BBL|04–06)
- Sam Heazlett (BBL|07–12)
- Matthew Renshaw (BBL|07–09, 12–16)
- Marnus Labuschagne (BBL|08–15)
- James Pattinson (BBL|08–09)
- Mitchell Swepson (BBL|08–14)
- Ben Laughlin (BBL|09–10)
- Jack Wildermuth (BBL|10–16)
- Michael Neser (BBL|11–16)
- Usman Khawaja (BBL|12–16)
- Matthew Kuhnemann (BBL|12–16)
- Spencer Johnson (BBL|13–16)
- Xavier Bartlett (BBL|14–16)
- Nathan McSweeney (BBL|14–16)

=== Overseas marquees ===
- (New Zealand) Brendon McCullum (BBL|01, 06–08)
- (South Africa) Roelof van der Merwe (BBL|01)
- (New Zealand) Daniel Vettori (BBL|01, 03–04)
- (Sri Lanka) Thisara Perera (BBL|02)
- (Cricket West Indies) Kemar Roach (BBL|02)
- (England) Craig Kieswetter (BBL|03)
- (England) Andrew Flintoff (BBL|04)
- (England) Stephen Parry (BBL|04)
- (Cricket West Indies) Samuel Badree (BBL|05–06)
- (Cricket West Indies) Lendl Simmons (BBL|05)
- (England) Tymal Mills (BBL|06)
- (Pakistan) Shadab Khan (BBL|07)
- (Pakistan) Yasir Shah (BBL|07)
- (Afghanistan) Mujeeb Ur Rahman (BBL|08–11)
- (England) Tom Banton (BBL|09, 14)
- (South Africa) AB de Villiers (BBL|09)
- (Afghanistan) Zahir Khan (BBL|09)
- (England) Joe Denly (BBL|10)
- (England) Lewis Gregory (BBL|10)
- (England) Dan Lawrence (BBL|10)
- (England) Tom Abell (BBL|11)
- (England) Ben Duckett (BBL|11)
- (Pakistan) Fakhar Zaman (BBL|11)
- (England) Sam Billings (BBL|12–13)
- (New Zealand) Colin Munro (BBL|12–15)
- (England) Ross Whiteley (BBL|12)
- (England) Sam Hain (BBL|12)
- (England) Paul Walter (BBL|13–14)
- (England) Tom Alsop (BBL|14–15)
- (Pakistan) Shaheen Afridi (BBL|15)
- (England) Tom Curran (BBL|16)
- (New Zealand) Bevon Jacobs (BBL|16)
- (New Zealand) Tim Robinson (BBL|16)

== Honours ==
- Champions: 2 – BBL|02, BBL|13
- Runners-Up: 1 – BBL|12
- Minor Premiers: 1 – BBL|13
- Finals Appearances: 5 – BBL|02, BBL|06, BBL|10, BBL|12, BBL|13
- Wooden Spoons: 1 – BBL|04

== Statistics and awards ==
As of 25 January 2026

=== Team stats ===
- Win–loss record:

Big Bash League:

Opposition	M	Won	Lost	Tied	NR	W–L%
Adelaide Strikers	24	12	11	0	1	52.17
Hobart Hurricanes	25	11	14	0	0	44
Melbourne Renegades	23	8	15	0	0	34.78
Melbourne Stars	22	14	8	0	0	63.64
Perth Scorchers	25	9	16	0	0	36
Sydney Sixers	27	7	17	0	3	29.17
Sydney Thunder	24	15	8	0	1	65.22
Total	170	76	89	0	5	46.06

Champions League Twenty20:

Opposition	M	Won	Lost	Tied	NR	W–L%
Chennai Super Kings	1	0	1	0	0	0
Sunrisers Hyderabad	1	0	0	0	1	0
Titans	1	0	1	0	0	0
Trinidad and Tobago	1	0	1	0	0	0
Total	4	0	3	0	1	0

- Highest score in an innings: 2/258 (19.5 overs) vs Perth Scorchers, 19 December 2025
- Highest successful chase: 2/258 (19.5 overs) vs Perth Scorchers, 19 December 2025
- Lowest successful defence: 7/129 (20 overs) vs Adelaide Strikers, 18 January 2014
- Largest victory:
  - Batting first: 103 runs vs Melbourne Stars, 7 December 2023
  - Batting second: 60 balls remaining vs Melbourne Stars, 8 February 2019
- Longest winning streak: 7 matches (7 December 2023 – 10 January 2024)
- Longest losing streak: 8 matches (6 January – 21 December 2022)

=== Individual stats ===
- Most runs: Chris Lynn – 3,005
- Highest score in an innings: Josh Brown – 140 (57) vs Adelaide Strikers, 22 January 2024
- Highest partnership: Matt Renshaw and Jack Wildermuth – 212 vs Perth Scorchers, 19 December 2025
- Most wickets: Mark Steketee – 88
- Best bowling figures in an innings: Mujeeb Ur Rahman – 5/15 (4 overs) vs Hobart Hurricanes, 30 December 2020
- Hat-tricks taken:
  - Josh Lalor vs Perth Scorchers, 1 February 2019
  - Michael Neser vs Melbourne Renegades, 21 December 2022
- Most catches (fielder): Max Bryant – 34
- Most dismissals (wicket-keeper): Jimmy Peirson – 90 (73 catches, 17 stumpings)

=== Individual awards ===
- Player of the Match:
  - Chris Lynn – 13
  - Xavier Bartlett and Ben Cutting – 4
  - Max Bryant, Joe Burns, Michael Neser, Jimmy Peirson, Luke Pomersbach, Matt Renshaw, Mitch Swepson, and Mujeeb Ur Rahman – 3
  - Josh Brown, Dan Christian, Usman Khawaja, Matthew Kuhnemann, Marnus Labuschagne, Nathan McSweeney, Daniel Vettori, and Paul Walter – 2
  - Samuel Badree, Tom Banton, James Bazley, Sam Billings, AB de Villiers, Ben Duckett, Ryan Duffield, Lewis Gregory, Sam Hain, Nathan Hauritz, Matthew Hayden, Sam Heazlett, James Hopes, Spencer Johnson, Brendon McCullum, Colin Munro, James Pattinson, Alex Ross, and Mark Steketee – 1
- BBL Player of the Final:
  - Nathan Hauritz – BBL|02
  - Spencer Johnson – BBL|13
- BBL Player of the Tournament:
  - Chris Lynn (2) – BBL|05, BBL|06
- BBL Team of the Tournament:
  - Chris Lynn (2) – BBL|05, BBL|06
  - Mark Steketee (2) – BBL|06, BBL|10
  - Samuel Badree – BBL|05
  - Brendon McCullum – BBL|06
  - Mitchell Swepson – BBL|06
  - Michael Neser – BBL|12
  - Xavier Bartlett – BBL|13
  - Matthew Kuhnemann – BBL|13
  - Paul Walter – BBL|13
  - Matt Renshaw – BBL|15

== See also ==
- Queensland Cricket
- Queensland cricket team
