= Graham Bizzell =

Australian cricketer

Personal information
- Born: 19 November 1941; Beenleigh, Queensland, Australia
- Died: 29 April 2014 (aged 72); Brisbane, Australia
- Relatives: Jack Wildermuth (grandson)
- Source: ESPNcricinfo, 22 April 2016

Graham Bizzell (19 November 1941 – 29 April 2014) was an Australian cricketer. He played thirty first-class matches for Queensland between 1961 and 1966. His grandson, Jack Wildermuth, is also a cricketer, who has played Twenty20 International (T20I) cricket for Australia.
