= Spencer Johnson (cricketer) =

Australian cricketer (born 1995)

Personal information
- Full name: Spencer Henry Johnson
- Born: 16 December 1995 (age 30); Adelaide, South Australia
- Height: 193 cm (6 ft 4 in)
- Batting: Left-handed
- Bowling: Left-arm fast
- Role: Bowler

International information
- National side: Australia (2023–present)
- ODI debut (cap 243): 24 September 2023 v India
- Last ODI: 20 September 2026 v Zimbabwe
- ODI shirt no.: 45
- T20I debut (cap 105): 30 August 2023 v South Africa
- Last T20I: 21 June 2026 v Bangladesh
- T20I shirt no.: 45

Domestic team information
- Years: Team
- 2017/18–present: South Australia (squad no. 21)
- 2022/23–present: Brisbane Heat (squad no. 45)
- 2023–2024: Oval Invincibles (squad no. 21)
- 2024: Gujarat Titans (squad no. 42)
- 2024: Surrey (squad no. 21)
- 2023–2024: Los Angeles Knight Riders
- 2025: Kolkata Knight Riders
- 2026: Chennai Super Kings

Career statistics
Competition	ODI	T20I	FC	LA
Matches	7	11	6	15
Runs scored	19	0	27	47
Batting average	19.00	0.00	5.40	9.40
100s/50s	0/0	0/0	0/0	0/0
Top score	12*	0	17	12*
Balls bowled	354	208	1,189	771
Wickets	7	17	26	17
Bowling average	47.14	17.29	27.46	41.41
5 wickets in innings	–	1	2	0
10 wickets in match	–	0	0	0
Best bowling	2/44	5/26	7/47	4/46
Catches/stumpings	1/–	0/–	5/–	3/–
- Source: Cricinfo, 2 October 2026

Spencer Henry Johnson (born 16 December 1995) is an Australian international cricketer who represents the Australia national cricket team in ODI and T20I cricket. A left-arm fast bowler, Johnson plays for South Australia in domestic cricket.

== Domestic career ==
Johnson made his List A debut in the 2017–18 JLT One-Day Cup playing for South Australia in the 15th match against Victoria on 12 October 2017. He did not bat, but he bowled 10 overs and took one wicket for 72 runs. South Australia won the match by 11 runs. Despite being delisted by South Australia ahead of the 2020/21 season, Johnson returned to the squad for the 2020-21 Marsh One-Day Cup after impressive performances in South Australian Premier Cricket.

Johnson was named in the Adelaide Strikers squad ahead of the 2020-21 Big Bash League season, however did not feature in the tournament. Johnson would eventually make his BBL debut in the 2022–23 season on 11 January 2023, for the Brisbane Heat. He played ten matches in the season, including the final, and gained a reputation as a reliable death bowler. Johnson would later on win the final for the 2023–24 Big Bash League season.

In his first-class debut on 20 February 2023, Johnson picked up figures of 6/87 against Victoria, which he bettered in his next match against Queensland with 7/47.

On 10 August 2023, Johnson made his debut for Oval Invincibles, a team in the English competition The Hundred. On debut, Johnson impressed with figures of 3/1 off 20 balls against Manchester Originals.

On 24 March 2026, Johnson was signed as a replacement player for Nathan Ellis for INR 1.5 crore, by Chennai Super Kings ahead of the 2026 IPL season after previously going unsold during the Player Auction.

== International career ==
In March 2023, Johnson was named in an Australia A squad to tour New Zealand in the lead up to the 2023 Ashes series. Johnson played the first match of the tour in Lincoln, taking 4/53 in the first innings.

A dual citizen of Australia and Italy, Johnson was expected to debut for the Italian cricket team in July 2023 ahead of the 2022–23 ICC Men's T20 World Cup Europe Qualifier. However, in August of the same year, Johnson was selected in a 14-player squad for Australia's T20I series against South Africa. He made his international debut in the first match, taking 2/33 in a 111-run win.

In February 2024, he was selected in Australia's squad for the T20 series against West Indies. In the second match of the series, he took 2 wickets for 39 runs. On 16 November 2024, Johnson took his maiden international five-wicket haul in a T20I against Pakistan, taking figures of 5/26 in four overs.
