= Matthew Kuhnemann =

Australian cricketer (born 1996)

Matt Kuhnemann
- Kuhnemann in 2026

Personal information
- Full name: Matthew Paul Kuhnemann
- Born: 20 September 1996 (age 30); Brisbane, Queensland, Australia
- Batting: Left-handed
- Bowling: Slow left-arm orthodox
- Role: Bowler

International information
- National side: Australia (2022–present)
- Test debut (cap 466): 17 February 2023 v India
- Last Test: 6 February 2025 v Sri Lanka
- ODI debut (cap 237): 16 June 2022 v Sri Lanka
- Last ODI: 4 June 2026 v Pakistan
- ODI shirt no.: 50
- T20I debut (cap 113): 22 July 2025 v West Indies
- Last T20I: 13 February 2026 v Zimbabwe
- T20I shirt no.: 50

Domestic team information
- Years: Team
- 2017/18: Cricket Australia XI (squad no. 18)
- 2018/19–2023/24: Queensland (squad no. 30)
- 2018/19–present: Brisbane Heat (squad no. 18)
- 2023: Durham (squad no. 50)
- 2024/25–present: Tasmania
- 2025: Glamorgan

Career statistics
Competition	Test	ODI	T20I	FC
Matches	5	8	8	35
Runs scored	18	54	7	369
Batting average	4.50	13.50	2.33	13.66
100s/50s	0/0	0/0	0/0	0/1
Top score	6	24	5	56
Balls bowled	1,026	432	162	6,979
Wickets	25	13	3	114
Bowling average	22.20	25.00	73.33	28.92
5 wickets in innings	2	0	0	9
10 wickets in match	0	0	0	1
Best bowling	5/16	3/38	1/27	6/53
Catches/stumpings	2/–	2/–	0/–	16/–
Medal record
Men's cricket
Representing Australia
World Test Championship
Runner-up	2023–2025
- Source: ESPNcricinfo, 13 June 2026

Matthew Paul Kuhnemann (born 20 September 1996) is an Australian cricketer. He made his List A debut for Cricket Australia XI in the 2017–18 JLT One-Day Cup on 8 October 2017 after being offered a rookie contract for Queensland in the 2016–17 and 2017–18 seasons. He made his international debut for the Australia cricket team in June 2022.

== Career ==
Kuhnemann was born in Brisbane and moved to the Gold Coast in his childhood where he attended The Southport School. He began playing cricket at the age of 10 and made his first grade debut for the Gold Coast Dolphins at 17 years of age. In 2014, he played a pivotal role in the First XI GPS Premiership win for TSS, a victory he still considers the favourite memory of his junior career.

Kuhnemann was named in the Cricket Australia XI squad for the 2017–18 JLT One-Day Cup. He made his List A cricket debut in the 11th match of the tournament against New South Wales. He bowled five overs and took his first List A wicket, getting Kurtis Patterson out stumped. In the second innings he scored 14 runs off 13 balls batting 11th for Cricket Australia before he himself was stumped, ending their run chase 93 runs short.

He made his Twenty20 debut for the Brisbane Heat in the 2018–19 Big Bash League season on 1 February 2019. He made his first-class debut on 17 February 2021, for Queensland in the 2020–21 Sheffield Shield season.

In June 2022, Kuhnemann was added to Australia's One Day International (ODI) squad for their series against Sri Lanka. He made his ODI debut on 16 June 2022, for Australia in Pallekele, taking two wickets.

Kuhnemann made his Test debut in the second Test against India in India in February 2023. He was not originally in the squad, with Ashton Agar and Mitchell Swepson being selected ahead of him. But when Swepson returned to Australia for personal reasons, Kuhnemann was added to the squad. Kuhnemann was then selected ahead of Agar for the second Test, and kept his place for the third and fourth Tests. On March 1, 2023 in the third Test at Indore, Kuhnemann took his maiden international five-wicket haul. Kuhnemann finished the first innings with figures of 5/16, playing an important role in Australia’s victory over India.

Kuhnemann was selected for the Australian Cricket team’s 2025 tour of Sri-Lanka. However, Kuhnemann sustained an injury to his right thumb in a Big Bash League game which required surgery. This left Kuhnemann in doubt for the tour. However, he was eventually cleared to play the first Test. In the first Test at Galle, Kuhnemann took his second five-wicket haul in tests finishing the second innings with figures of 5/63. Kuhnemann took a further four wickets in the third innings helping to steer Australia to a convincing win. He took 7 wickets in the second Test, finishing the series as the leading wicket-taker with 16 wickets at an average of 17.18. He was reported for a suspected illegal bowling action at the conclusion of the second Test by the match officials, and was subsequently suspended from bowling in international matches until testing could be completed. On 26 February, his action was cleared after undergoing testing with the International Cricket Council, allowing him to continue bowling in international matches.

On the 16th of March 2026, playing in a Sheffield Shield match for Tasmania, Khunemann scored his maiden first-class half-century, scoring 56 off of 201 deliveries against Queensland.
