= Simon Lightbody =

Australian cricket umpire

Personal information
- Full name: Simon Lightbody

Umpiring information
- Source: ESPN Cricinfo, 30 December 2017

Simon Lightbody is an Australian cricket umpire. He was promoted to the National Umpiring Panel for the 2017–18 cricket season. He has stood in domestic matches in the 2017–18 Sheffield Shield season and the 2017–18 JLT One-Day Cup.
