= Mark Steketee =

Australian cricketer

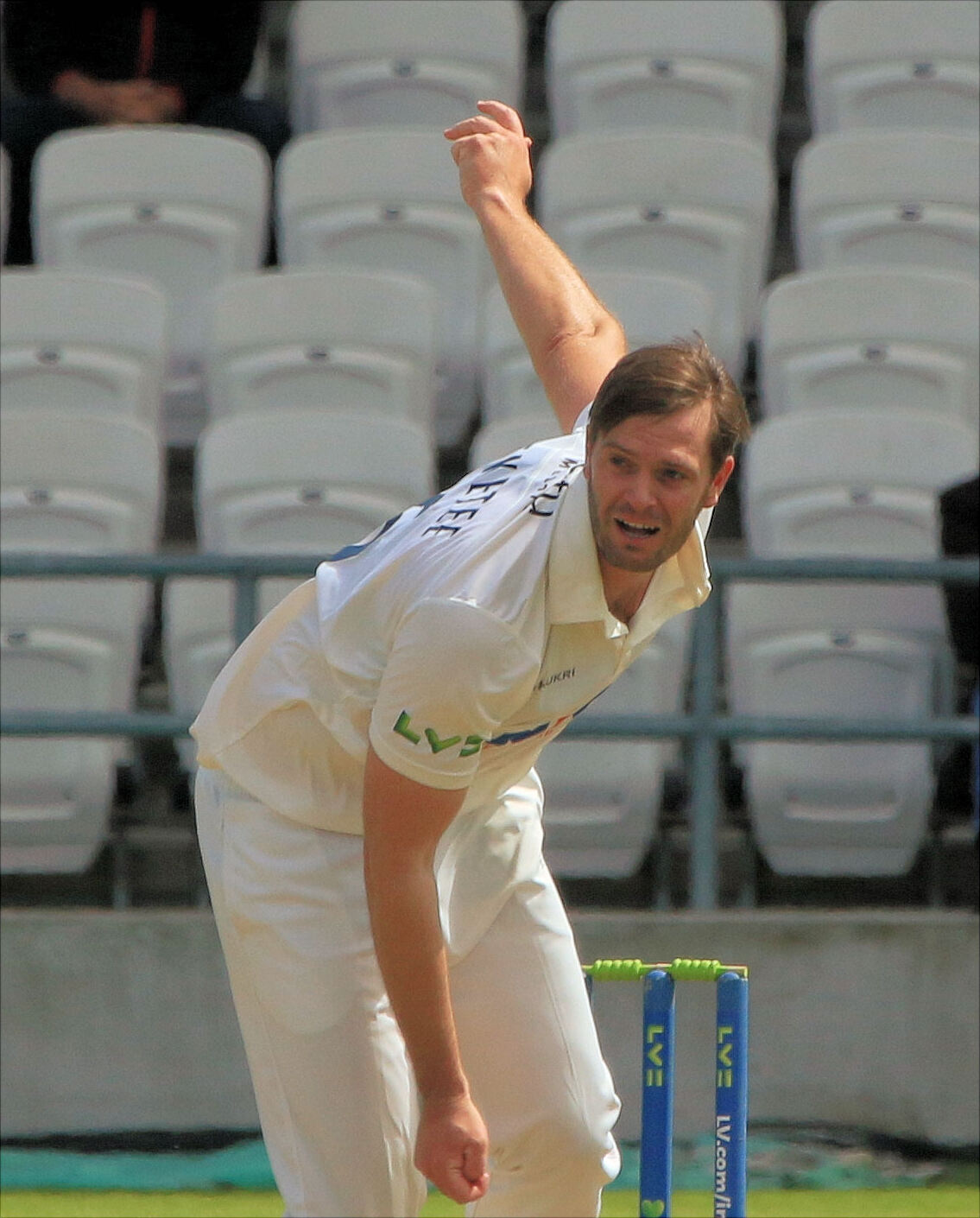
- Steketee bowling for Yorkshire in 2023

Personal information
- Full name: Mark Thomas Steketee
- Born: 17 January 1994 (age 32); Monto, Queensland, Australia
- Nickname: Sticky
- Height: 187 cm (6 ft 2 in)
- Batting: Right-handed
- Bowling: Right-arm fast-medium
- Role: Bowler

Domestic team information
- Years: Team
- 2013/14–2022/23: Brisbane Heat
- 2014/15–present: Queensland
- 2016/17: Cricket Australia XI
- 2022: Essex
- 2023: Yorkshire
- 2023/24–Present: Melbourne Stars

Career statistics
Competition	FC	LA	T20
Matches	94	52	78
Runs scored	1,581	413	199
Batting average	16.13	17.95	7.37
100s/50s	0/4	0/0	0/0
Top score	53	35*	33
Balls bowled	16,997	2,332	1,608
Wickets	327	66	104
Bowling average	26.74	31.45	23.04
5 wickets in innings	6	0	1
10 wickets in match	1	0	0
Best bowling	7/44	4/25	5/17
Catches/stumpings	30/–	11/–	22/–
- Source: Cricinfo, 21 October 2025

Mark Thomas Steketee (born 17 January 1994) is an Australian cricketer. He plays for Queensland. He plays his club cricket for Valley District Cricket Club in Brisbane. During the 2017–18 season, Steketee represented the Cricket Australia XI in the 2017–18 JLT One-Day Cup.

Instead of playing for Queensland in the 2017–18 JLT One-Day Cup, Steketee was named in the Cricket Australia XI team. He played four matches for them, taking five wickets at an average of 38.40 and conceding 6.06 runs per over. In November 2019, in the 2019–20 Sheffield Shield season match against Tasmania, Steketee took his first five-wicket haul in first-class cricket.

In January 2021, Steketee was named in Australia's Test squad for their series against South Africa. The following month, he was also added to Australia's Test squad for their series against Pakistan. In March 2022, Steketee was signed by Essex County Cricket Club to play in their first six matches of the County Championship in England.
