= Sam Heazlett =

Australian cricketer

Personal information
- Full name: Samuel Daly Heazlett
- Born: 12 September 1995 (age 31); Sunnybank, Queensland, Australia
- Batting: Left-handed
- Bowling: Slow left-arm orthodox
- Role: Batter

International information
- National side: Australia (2017)
- Only ODI (cap 220): 30 January 2017 v New Zealand

Domestic team information
- Years: Team
- 2015/16–2022/23: Queensland
- 2015/16–present: Brisbane Heat

Career statistics
Competition	ODI	FC	LA	T20
Matches	1	41	40	51
Runs scored	4	2,058	1,615	898
Batting average	4.00	29.82	42.50	18.70
100s/50s	0/0	4/9	3/14	0/3
Top score	4	135	107	74*
Catches/stumpings	0/–	38/–	16/–	23/–
- Source: ESPNcricinfo, 14 February 2022

Samuel Daly Heazlett (born 12 September 1995) is an Australian cricketer who plays for Queensland in Australian domestic cricket and the Brisbane Heat in the Big Bash League. He made his state-level debut for Queensland in November 2015, and despite his inexperience, he was fast-tracked into the Australian national cricket team for a One Day International (ODI) debut in January 2017. As of December 2022, he has not played another match for Australia.

== Domestic career ==
Heazlett made his first-class debut on 6 November 2015 in the 2015–16 Sheffield Shield, scoring a century against Tasmania. On 29 December 2015 he made his Twenty20 debut for the Brisbane Heat in the 2015–16 Big Bash League. At the end of the 2015–16 season, he was included in Australia's second-level team, Australia A, who played matches against India A and South Africa A in the 2016 winter. Heazlett made his List A debut during this winter, playing for the National Performance Squad.

== ODI debut ==
Heazlett was fast-tracked into the Australian national cricket team in January 2017 despite having very limited experience in state cricket. Heazlett suffered a thigh strain that ruled him out of playing for Queensland in the 2016–17 Matador BBQs One-Day Cup, meaning at the end of 2016 he still had not played a one-day match for his state team. Regardless, he was added to Australia's One Day International (ODI) squad as a replacement for the injured Steve Smith for their series against New Zealand. Heazlett was told the day before the first ODI that he would not be in the playing XI for that game, but when wicket-keeper Matthew Wade was ruled out of the first ODI due to a back strain, Heazlett became a last-minute replacement. As a result, he made his ODI debut for Australia against New Zealand on 30 January 2017. He only scored 4 runs, and did not play for the rest of the series. Former Australian fast bowler Stuart Clark criticized Heazlett's selection, saying, "You've got a lot of guys running around playing first-class cricket and you go, 'Hang on, why are they not getting an opportunity?' But the selectors have obviously seen someone and thought, 'Well this guy's a player of the future, let's get him into the series'. But I'm a bit uncomfortable with that."
