= Jack Wildermuth =

Australian cricketer

Personal information
- Full name: Jack David Wildermuth
- Born: 1 September 1993 (age 33); Toowoomba, Queensland, Australia
- Batting: Right-handed
- Bowling: Right-arm medium-fast
- Role: All-rounder
- Relatives: Graham Bizzell (grandfather); Tom Veivers (great uncle)

International information
- National side: Australia (2018)
- T20I debut (cap 92): 6 July 2018 v Zimbabwe
- Last T20I: 8 July 2018 v Pakistan

Domestic team information
- Years: Team
- 2014/15–present: Queensland
- 2016/17: Brisbane Heat
- 2017/18–2019/20: Melbourne Renegades
- 2020/21–2021/22: Brisbane Heat
- 2021: Quetta Gladiators
- 2025/26–present: Brisbane Heat

Career statistics
| Competition | T20I | FC | LA | T20 |
|---|---|---|---|---|
| Matches | 2 | 78 | 38 | 58 |
| Runs scored | 1 | 3,286 | 670 | 418 |
| Batting average | - | 28.32 | 20.93 | 13.93 |
| 100s/50s | 0/0 | 5/14 | 0/6 | 1/0 |
| Top score | 1* | 111* | 83 | 110* |
| Balls bowled | 18 | 10,752 | 1,614 | 1,093 |
| Wickets | 1 | 180 | 44 | 46 |
| Bowling average | 32.00 | 30.42 | 34.86 | 33.65 |
| 5 wickets in innings | 0 | 1 | 0 | 0 |
| 10 wickets in match | 0 | 0 | 0 | 0 |
| Best bowling | 1/16 | 5/40 | 4/39 | 3/16 |
| Catches/stumpings | 1/– | 25/– | 7/– | 10/– |
- Source: Cricinfo, 20 December 2025

Jack David Wildermuth (born 1 September 1993) is an Australian cricketer. He plays first-class cricket for Queensland. He made his List A debut for Cricket Australia XI on 5 October 2015 in the 2015–16 Matador BBQs One-Day Cup. He made his Twenty20 (T20) debut for Brisbane Heat in the 2016–17 Big Bash League season on 21 December 2016.

In May 2018, he was named in Australia's Twenty20 International (T20I) squad for the 2018 Zimbabwe Tri-Nation Series. He made his T20I debut against Zimbabwe on 6 July 2018.

Wildermuth's grandfather, Graham Bizzell, also played first-class cricket for Queensland, and his great-uncle, Tom Veivers, played Test cricket for Australia.
