= Greg Davidson =

Australian cricket umpire (born 1970)

Personal information
- Full name: Gregory James Davidson
- Born: 7 November 1970 (age 56); Parramatta, Sydney
- Height: 207 cm (6 ft 9 in)
- Role: Umpire

Umpiring information
- WTests umpired: 1 (2014)
- WODIs umpired: 5 (2014–2017)
- WT20Is umpired: 5 (2014)
- Source: ESPNcricinfo, 21 January 2023

Gregory James Davidson is an Australian cricket umpire. Davidson played in Sydney Grade Cricket for Parramatta District Cricket Club, spending time as first grade captain. Davidson turned to umpiring after retiring from playing in his late 30s. He made his first-class cricket umpiring debut in 2013 in Hobart.
