= Jimmy Peirson =

Australian cricketer (born 1992)

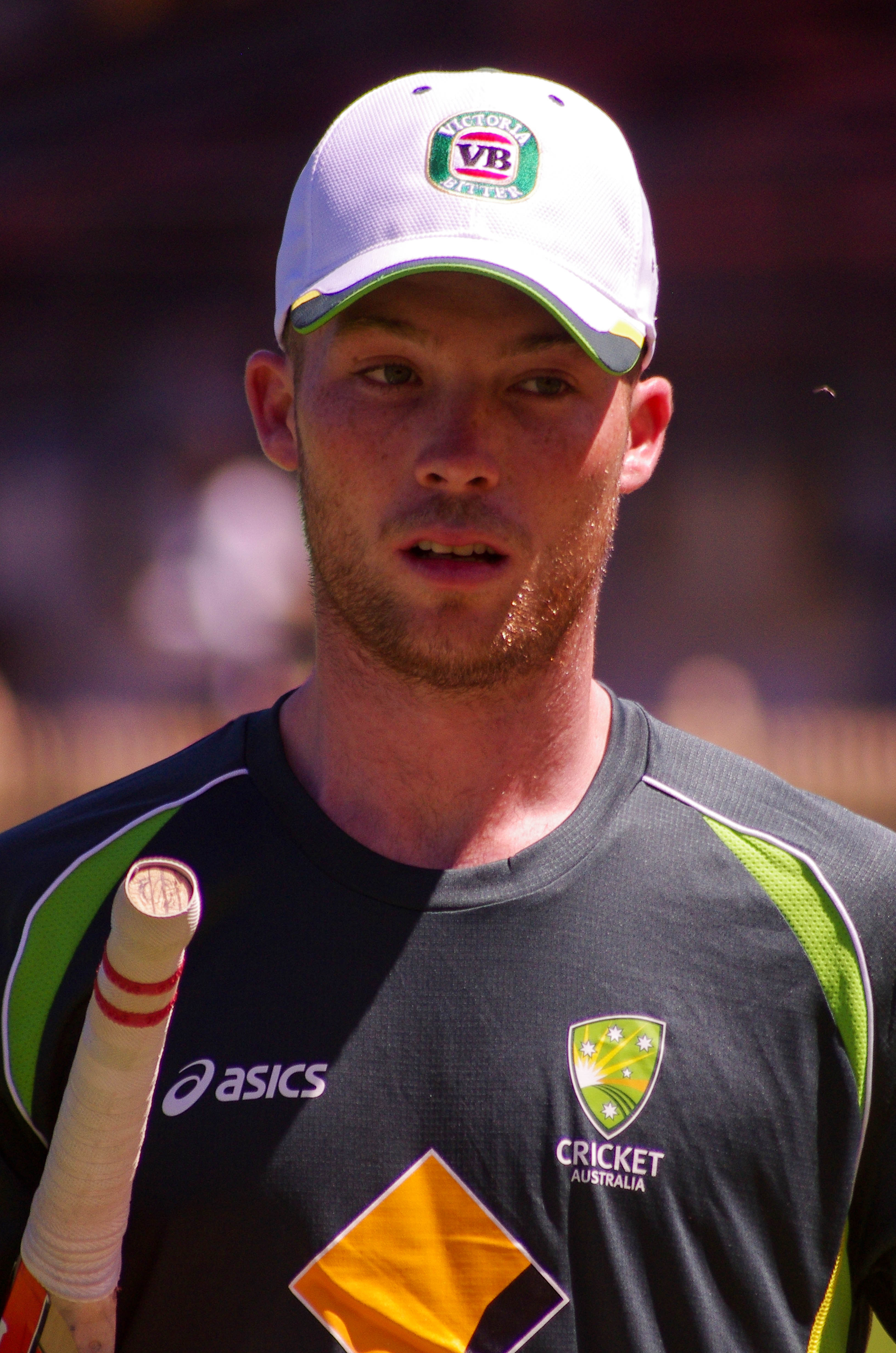
- Peirson in 2014

Personal information
- Full name: James John Peirson
- Born: 13 October 1992 (age 34); Sydney, New South Wales, Australia
- Batting: Right-handed
- Role: Wicket-keeper

Domestic team information
- Years: Team
- 2013/14–present: Queensland
- 2014/15–present: Brisbane Heat
- 2015/16: Cricket Australia XI

Career statistics
Competition	FC	LA	T20
Matches	101	71	125
Runs scored	4,629	1,704	1938
Batting average	33.30	27.93	21.77
100s/50s	9/24	1/9	0/7
Top score	132	100*	72*
Catches/stumpings	372/5	87/7	74/17
- Source: ESPNcricinfo, 23 October 2026

James John Peirson (born 13 October 1992) is an Australian cricketer.

== Domestic career ==
Peirson plays for Queensland and the Redlands Tigers in Brisbane Grade Cricket. He made his List A debut on 17 October 2013 for Queensland against New South Wales. He made his first-class debut for Cricket Australia XI against the West Indians during their tour of Australia in December 2015.

Peirson was Queensland's youngest-ever Sheffield Shield winning captain when the Queensland Bulls won the competition in 2018. He was part of Queensland's 2020-2021 Sheffield Shield winning side for the second time in his career when the Queensland Bulls defeated New South Wales by an innings and 33 runs at Allan Border Field. In November 2020, in the fourth round of the 2020–21 Sheffield Shield season, Peirson scored his maiden century in first-class cricket.

== International career ==
In May 2023, he received his first international call-up for the Test matches against England, in the 2023 Ashes series.
