= Michael Graham-Smith =

Australian cricket umpire (born 1969)

Personal information
- Full name: Michael Wayne Graham-Smith
- Born: 5 August 1969 (age 57); Burnie, Tasmania, Australia
- Role: Umpire

Umpiring information
- T20Is umpired: 3 (2022–2022)
- WTests umpired: 1 (2022)
- WODIs umpired: 7 (2016–2023)
- WT20Is umpired: 4 (2020–2023)
- Source: ESPNcricinfo, 29 January 2023

Michael Graham-Smith (born 5 August 1969 in Burnie, Tasmania) is an Australian cricket umpire. He made his umpiring debut in domestic cricket on 4 October 2013, during the Ryobi One-Day Cup.

Graham-Smith taught mathematics at Elizabeth College in Hobart.

On 15 October 2022, he stood in his first Twenty20 International (T20I) match, between Indonesia and South Korea. As of January 2023, Graham-Smith has officiated in 15 international fixtures.
