= Shawn Craig =

Australian cricketer (born 1973)

Personal information
- Full name: Shawn Andrew Jacob Craig
- Born: 23 June 1973 (age 53); Carlton, Victoria, Australia
- Batting: Left-handed
- Bowling: Leg spin

Domestic team information
- Years: Team
- 1997–2001: Victoria
- First-class debut: 7 March 1997 Victoria v South Australia
- Last First-class: 29 November 2000 Victoria v Queensland
- List A debut: 23 February 1997 Victoria v Western Australia
- Last List A: 4 November 2001 Victoria v South Australia

Umpiring information
- T20Is umpired: 16 (2019–2025)
- WODIs umpired: 11 (2014–2026)
- WT20Is umpired: 11 (2014–2023)

Career statistics
Competition	FC	LA
Matches	20	20
Runs scored	936	346
Batting average	31.20	24.71
100s/50s	1/4	0/2
Top score	128*	60
Balls bowled	1007	149
Wickets	8	7
Bowling average	83.00	23.57
5 wickets in innings	0	0
10 wickets in match	0	0
Best bowling	2/89	3/56
Catches/stumpings	20/0	4/0
- Source: Cricket Archive, 24 January 2023

Shawn Craig (born 23 June 1973) is an Australian former first-class cricketer, who is now an umpire.

== Playing career ==
Craig played first-class cricket for the Victorian Bushrangers, debuting in 1996–97 after graduating from the Australian Cricket Academy. He was used for his part-time legspin and his middle-order batting. His finest knock with the bat was an unbeaten 128 in 1998–99.

In his first-class career he averaged 31 with Victoria over the space of 20 matches, and was cut from the state squad after the 2001–02 season. Following this he became a prominent all-rounder in Victorian Premier Cricket, opening the batting for St Kilda Cricket Club.

== Umpiring career ==
Craig is a member of the Cricket Australia Project Panel and officiates at First Grade level in Victorian Premier Cricket. He made his international umpiring debut in 2014 and had officiated in 24 international fixtures, as of January 2023.

== See also ==
- List of Victoria first-class cricketers
- List of Twenty20 International cricket umpires
