= 2026–27 Big Bash League season =

Australian cricket tournament

2026–27 Big Bash League
- Dates: 12 December 2026 – 26 January 2027
- Administrator: Cricket Australia
- Cricket format: Twenty20
- Tournament format(s): Group stage and playoffs
- Participants: 8
- Matches: 44
- Official website: BBL

The 2026–27 Big Bash League season or BBL|16 will be the sixteenth edition of the Big Bash League (BBL). The tournament will be played from 12 December 2026, with the final held on 26 January 2027. The Perth Scorchers are the defending champions.

== Background ==
The Big Bash League is a professional men's Twenty20 cricket tournament played in Australia and organised by Cricket Australia. It was first held in 2011–12, with the 2026–27 season marking its sixteenth edition. The fifteenth edition was won by the Perth Scorchers, who defeated the Sydney Sixers in the final.

=== Format changes ===
"Designated batters" will be implemented for the first time. Similar to the "X-Factor player" from 2020–21, teams will be able to nominate a player who will not be allowed to field or bowl. Over-rate penalty rules will also be changed, enforcing full powerplay restrictions on teams who breach the over-rate timer.

=== Schedule ===
On 13 July 2026, Cricket Australia announced the full schedule for the 16th season of the Big Bash League. The tournament was scheduled to take place from 12 December 2026 to 26 January 2027, featuring 44 matches, including 40 regular-season matches and four finals.

The opening match was scheduled to feature Melbourne Renegades against the defending champions Perth Scorchers on 12 December 2026 at M. A. Chidambaram Stadium in Chennai, India. It marked the first time in the history of the Big Bash League that a match was scheduled to be played outside Australia.

The first match to be played in Australia was scheduled for 15 December 2026, featuring Brisbane Heat against Sydney Sixers at The Gabba in Brisbane. The final was scheduled to take place on 26 January 2027, coinciding with Australia Day.

== Teams ==
| Team | Home ground(s) | Captain | Head coach |
|---|---|---|---|
| Adelaide Strikers | Adelaide Oval | Matt Short | Tim Paine |
| Brisbane Heat | The Gabba | | James Hopes |
| Hobart Hurricanes | Bellerive Oval | Nathan Ellis | Jeff Vaughan |
| Hobart Hurricanes | York Park | Nathan Ellis | Jeff Vaughan |
| Melbourne Renegades | Melbourne Cricket Ground | Will Sutherland | Luke Ronchi |
| Melbourne Renegades | Junction Oval | Will Sutherland | Luke Ronchi |
| Melbourne Stars | Melbourne Cricket Ground | Marcus Stoinis | Cameron White |
| Melbourne Stars | Junction Oval | Marcus Stoinis | Cameron White |
| Perth Scorchers | Perth Stadium | Ashton Turner | Adam Voges |
| Sydney Sixers | Sydney Cricket Ground | | Matthew Mott |
| Sydney Sixers | Manuka Oval | | Matthew Mott |
| Sydney Thunder | Sydney Showground Stadium | | Andrew Flintoff |
| Sydney Thunder | Manuka Oval | | Andrew Flintoff |

=== Personnel changes ===
==== Coaching changes ====
Following Greg Shipperd's departure from the Sydney Sixers and Cricket NSW in January 2026, Matthew Mott was named as the coach of the team in July. Previously, James Hopes had been named head coach, but had stepped away from the position in June to work with the Brisbane Heat following the resignation of Johan Botha. Earlier that month, Andrew Flintoff was announced to have signed to the Sydney Thunder as head coach, replacing Trevor Bayliss.

Following an internal restructuring at Cricket Victoria, Cameron White switched from the Melbourne Renegades to the Melbourne Stars in July. Luke Ronchi was moved from the women's team to the men's team.

==== Captaincy changes ====
Moises Henriques retired from the Big Bash League in July 2026, stepping down as the captain of the Sydney Sixers.

== Squads ==
Each team is allowed to sign an 18-player squad, including a maximum of 12 players signed before 27 August 2026. Teams are allowed to sign additional replacement players in the instance that one of their players is unavailable. Following the removal of the International Player Draft, teams able to sign foreign players directly.

Squads contracted for the 2026–27 Big Bash League season
| Adelaide Strikers | Brisbane Heat | Hobart Hurricanes | Melbourne Renegades | Melbourne Stars | Perth Scorchers | Sydney Sixers | Sydney Thunder |
|---|---|---|---|---|---|---|---|
| Matt Short (c); Alex Carey; Mark Chapman (NZ); Mackenzie Harvey; Thomas Kelly; Lloyd Pope; Haris Rauf (PAK); Jason Sangha; Liam Scott; Ben Stokes (ENG); Tom Straker; Harjas Singh; Henry Thornton; Jerrssis Wadia | Xavier Bartlett; Max Bryant; Tom Curran (ENG); Lachlan Hearne; Bevon Jacobs (NZ); Spencer Johnson; Usman Khawaja; Matthew Kuhnemann; Nathan McSweeney; Michael Neser; Jimmy Peirson; Matt Renshaw; Tim Robinson (NZ); Callum Vidler; Hugh Weibgen; Jack Wildermuth | Nathan Ellis (c); Marcus Bean; Iain Carlisle; Nikhil Chaudhary; Tim David; Nick Hobson; Shai Hope (WI); Rishad Hossain (BAN); Ben McDermott; Riley Meredith; Mitchell Owen; Will Prestwidge; Billy Stanlake; Tim Ward; Jake Weatherald; Beau Webster; Adam Zampa | Will Sutherland (c); Michael Archer; Jonny Bairstow (ENG); ~~Jason Behrendorff~~; Michael Bracewell (NZ); Josh Brown; Harry Dixon; Brendan Doggett; Sam Elliott; Jake Fraser-McGurk; Caleb Jewell; Ben Manenti; Oliver Peake; Tom Rogers; Mustafizur Rahman (BAN); Callum Stow | Marcus Stoinis (c); Finn Allen (NZ); Austin Anlezark; Hilton Cartwright; Sam Harper; Liam Hatcher; Campbell Kellaway; Glenn Maxwell; Todd Murphy; Craig Overton (ENG); Jamie Overton (ENG); Tom Rogers; Peter Siddle; Mitchell Swepson | Ashton Turner (c); Ashton Agar; Mahli Beardman; Cooper Connolly; Brody Couch; Zak Crawley (ENG); Joel Curtis; Aneurin Donald (ENG); Albert Esterhuysen; Aaron Hardie; Calvin Harrison (ENG); Will Malajczuk; Mitchell Marsh; Lance Morris; Joel Paris; Jhye Richardson | Sean Abbott; Jafer Chohan (ENG); Joel Davies; Oliver Davies; Ben Dwarshuis; Jack Edwards; Chris Jordan (ENG); Hayden Kerr; Riley Kingsell; Fergus O'Neill; Josh Philippe; Corey Rocchiccioli; Jake Scott; Tim Seifert (NZ); Lachlan Shaw; Jordan Silk; Steve Smith | Cameron Bancroft; Sam Billings (ENG); Trent Boult (NZ); Lockie Ferguson (NZ); Matthew Gilkes; Chris Green; Ryan Hadley; Harry Hoekstra; Sam Konstas; Aidan O'Connor; Nic Maddinson; Will Salzmann; Daniel Sams; Tanveer Sangha; David Warner |

As of 13 November 2026

Notes

- Unless otherwise specified, all players are Australian.

== Venues ==
Eleven venues were selected to host the tournament. M. A. Chidambaram Stadium in Chennai will become the first venue outside Australia to host a Big Bash League match. Both York Park and Junction Oval will return as venues for the first time since 2023 and 2022, respectively—York Park will host the Hobart Hurricanes, and Junction Oval will host both the Melbourne Stars and the Melbourne Renegades. The Melbourne Cricket Ground will become the Renegades 'primary' home ground, with the team leaving Kardinia Park and Docklands Stadium. The Sydney Sixers will not host a match at Coffs Harbour International Stadium, instead hosting a match at Manuka Oval.

| Adelaide | Brisbane | Perth | Melbourne | | India |
|---|---|---|---|---|---|
| Adelaide Oval | The Gabba | Perth Stadium | Junction Oval | Melbourne Cricket Ground | 2026–27 Big Bash League season is located in India |
| Capacity: 53,500 | Capacity: 36,000 | Capacity: 60,000 | Capacity: 7,000 | Capacity: 100,000 | 2026–27 Big Bash League season is located in India |
| 2026–27 Big Bash League season is located in Australia | | | | | 2026–27 Big Bash League season is located in India |
| Hobart | Launceston | Sydney | | Canberra | Chennai |
| Bellerive Oval | York Park | Sydney Showground Stadium | Sydney Cricket Ground | Manuka Oval | M. A. Chidambaram Stadium |
| Capacity: 19,500 | Capacity: 15,615 | Capacity: 23,500 | Capacity: 48,000 | Capacity: 13,500 | Capacity: 39,000 |
| | | | | | M. A. Chidambaram Stadium in 2023 |

== Standings ==
=== Points table ===
| Pos | Team | Pld | W | L | NR | Pts | NRR | Qualification |
|---|---|---|---|---|---|---|---|---|
| 1 | Adelaide Strikers | 0 | 0 | 0 | 0 | 0 | — | Advanced to the Qualifier |
| 2 | Brisbane Heat | 0 | 0 | 0 | 0 | 0 | — | Advanced to the Qualifier |
| 3 | Hobart Hurricanes | 0 | 0 | 0 | 0 | 0 | — | Advanced to the Knockout |
| 4 | Melbourne Renegades | 0 | 0 | 0 | 0 | 0 | — | Advanced to the Knockout |
| 5 | Melbourne Stars | 0 | 0 | 0 | 0 | 0 | — | |
| 6 | Perth Scorchers | 0 | 0 | 0 | 0 | 0 | — | |
| 7 | Sydney Sixers | 0 | 0 | 0 | 0 | 0 | — | |
| 8 | Sydney Thunder | 0 | 0 | 0 | 0 | 0 | — | |

Source: Cricinfo

=== Match summary ===
| Team | Group matches | | | | | | | | | | Playoffs | | |
| Team | 1 | 2 | 3 | 4 | 5 | 6 | 7 | 8 | 9 | 10 | Q/K | C | F |
|---|---|---|---|---|---|---|---|---|---|---|---|---|---|
| Adelaide Strikers | ? | ? | ? | ? | ? | ? | ? | ? | ? | ? | | | |
| Brisbane Heat | ? | ? | ? | ? | ? | ? | ? | ? | ? | ? | | | |
| Hobart Hurricanes | ? | ? | ? | ? | ? | ? | ? | ? | ? | ? | | | |
| Melbourne Renegades | ? | ? | ? | ? | ? | ? | ? | ? | ? | ? | | | |
| Melbourne Stars | ? | ? | ? | ? | ? | ? | ? | ? | ? | ? | | | |
| Perth Scorchers | ? | ? | ? | ? | ? | ? | ? | ? | ? | ? | | | |
| Sydney Sixers | ? | ? | ? | ? | ? | ? | ? | ? | ? | ? | | | |
| Sydney Thunder | ? | ? | ? | ? | ? | ? | ? | ? | ? | ? | | | |

| Win | Loss | No result |

- Note: The total points at the end of each group match are listed.
- Note: Click on the points (group matches) or W/L (playoffs) to see the match summary.

| Visitor team → | ADS | BRH | HBH | MLR | MLS | PRS | SYS | SYT |
| Home team ↓ | ADS | BRH | HBH | MLR | MLS | PRS | SYS | SYT |
|---|---|---|---|---|---|---|---|---|
| Adelaide Strikers | | | Match 33 | Match 26 | Match 18 | Match 37 | | Match 10 |
| Brisbane Heat | Match 15 | | Match 20 | | | Match 28 | Match 2 | Match 40 |
| Hobart Hurricanes | Match 29 | Match 4 | | | Match 16 | | Match 39 | Match 25 |
| Melbourne Renegades | | Match 31 | Match 11 | | Match 38 | Match 1 | Match 19 | |
| Melbourne Stars | Match 5 | Match 8 | Match 35 | Match 23 | | | Match 27 | |
| Perth Scorchers | | Match 24 | Match 7 | Match 34 | Match 13 | | | Match 17 |
| Sydney Sixers | Match 22 | Match 12 | | Match 9 | | Match 30 | | Match 36 |
| Sydney Thunder | Match 3 | | | Match 14 | Match 32 | Match 21 | Match 6 | |

- Note: Results listed are according to the home (horizontal) and visitor (vertical) teams.
- Note: Click on a result to see a summary of the match.

== League stage ==
Prior to the release of the full schedule, Cricket Australia confirmed the first match of the season on 10 July 2026. They later confirmed the full schedule on 14 July, which included the dates for finals matches.

Match 1
12 December 2026
20:10 (N)
Scorecard

| Melbourne Renegades (H) | v | Perth Scorchers |

M. A. Chidambaram Stadium, Chennai

Match 2
15 December 2026
18:15 (N)
Scorecard

| Brisbane Heat (H) | v | Sydney Sixers |

The Gabba, Brisbane

Match 3
16 December 2026
19:15 (N)
Scorecard

| Sydney Thunder (H) | v | Adelaide Strikers |

Manuka Oval, Canberra

Match 4
17 December 2026
19:15 (N)
Scorecard

| Hobart Hurricanes (H) | v | Brisbane Heat |

Bellerive Oval, Hobart

Match 5
18 December 2026
19:15 (N)
Scorecard

| Melbourne Stars (H) | v | Adelaide Strikers |

Melbourne Cricket Ground, Melbourne

Match 6
19 December 2026
19:15 (N)
Scorecard

| Sydney Thunder (H) | v | Sydney Sixers |

Sydney Showground Stadium, Sydney

Match 7
20 December 2026
16:15 (N)
Scorecard

| Perth Scorchers (H) | v | Hobart Hurricanes |

Perth Stadium, Perth

Match 8
21 December 2026
19:15 (N)
Scorecard

| Melbourne Stars (H) | v | Brisbane Heat |

Junction Oval, Melbourne

Match 9
22 December 2026
19:15 (N)
Scorecard

| Sydney Sixers (H) | v | Melbourne Renegades |

Sydney Cricket Ground, Sydney

Match 10
23 December 2026
18:15 (N)
Scorecard

| Adelaide Strikers (H) | v | Sydney Thunder |

Adelaide Oval, Adelaide

Match 11
24 December 2026
19:15 (N)
Scorecard

| Melbourne Renegades (H) | v | Hobart Hurricanes |

Junction Oval, Melbourne

Match 12
26 December 2026
18:05 (N)
Scorecard

| Sydney Sixers (H) | v | Brisbane Heat |

Sydney Cricket Ground, Sydney

Match 13
26 December 2026
18:15 (N)
Scorecard

| Perth Scorchers (H) | v | Melbourne Stars |

Perth Stadium, Perth

Match 14
27 December 2026
19:15 (N)
Scorecard

| Sydney Thunder (H) | v | Melbourne Renegades |

Sydney Showground Stadium, Sydney

Match 15
28 December 2026
18:15 (N)
Scorecard

| Brisbane Heat (H) | v | Adelaide Strikers |

The Gabba, Brisbane

Match 16
29 December 2026
19:15 (N)
Scorecard

| Hobart Hurricanes (H) | v | Melbourne Stars |

Bellerive Oval, Hobart

Match 17
30 December 2026
16:15
Scorecard

| Perth Scorchers (H) | v | Sydney Thunder |

Perth Stadium, Perth

Match 18
31 December 2026
18:45 (N)
Scorecard

| Adelaide Strikers (H) | v | Melbourne Stars |

Adelaide Oval, Adelaide

Match 19
1 January 2027
16:00 (D/N)
Scorecard

| Melbourne Renegades (H) | v | Sydney Sixers |

Melbourne Cricket Ground, Melbourne

Match 20
1 January 2027
18:15 (N)
Scorecard

| Brisbane Heat (H) | v | Hobart Hurricanes |

The Gabba, Brisbane

Match 21
2 January 2027
19:15 (N)
Scorecard

| Sydney Thunder (H) | v | Perth Scorchers |

Sydney Showground Stadium, Sydney

Match 22
3 January 2027
19:15 (N)
Scorecard

| Sydney Sixers (H) | v | Adelaide Strikers |

Manuka Oval, Canberra

Match 23
4 January 2027
18:05 (N)
Scorecard

| Melbourne Stars (H) | v | Melbourne Renegades |

Melbourne Cricket Ground, Melbourne

Match 24
4 January 2027
18:15 (N)
Scorecard

| Perth Scorchers (H) | v | Brisbane Heat |

Perth Stadium, Perth

Match 25
5 January 2027
19:15 (N)
Scorecard

| Hobart Hurricanes (H) | v | Sydney Thunder |

Bellerive Oval, Hobart

Match 26
6 January 2027
18:45 (N)
Scorecard

| Adelaide Strikers (H) | v | Melbourne Renegades |

Adelaide Oval, Adelaide

Match 27
7 January 2027
19:15 (N)
Scorecard

| Melbourne Stars (H) | v | Sydney Sixers |

Melbourne Cricket Ground, Melbourne

Match 28
8 January 2027
18:15 (N)
Scorecard

| Brisbane Heat (H) | v | Perth Scorchers |

The Gabba, Brisbane

Match 29
9 January 2027
19:15 (N)
Scorecard

| Hobart Hurricanes (H) | v | Adelaide Strikers |

York Park, Launceston

Match 30
10 January 2027
14:10
Scorecard

| Sydney Sixers (H) | v | Perth Scorchers |

Sydney Cricket Ground, Sydney

Match 31
10 January 2027
19:15 (N)
Scorecard

| Melbourne Renegades (H) | v | Brisbane Heat |

Junction Oval, Melbourne

Match 32
11 January 2027
19:15 (N)
Scorecard

| Sydney Thunder (H) | v | Melbourne Stars |

Manuka Oval, Canberra

Match 33
12 January 2027
18:45 (N)
Scorecard

| Adelaide Strikers (H) | v | Hobart Hurricanes |

Adelaide Oval, Adelaide

Match 34
13 January 2027
16:15 (N)
Scorecard

| Perth Scorchers (H) | v | Melbourne Renegades |

Perth Stadium, Perth

Match 35
14 January 2027
19:15 (N)
Scorecard

| Melbourne Stars (H) | v | Hobart Hurricanes |

Melbourne Cricket Ground, Melbourne

Match 36
15 January 2027
19:15 (N)
Scorecard

| Sydney Sixers (H) | v | Sydney Thunder |

Sydney Cricket Ground, Sydney

Match 37
16 January 2027
15:30 (D/N)
Scorecard

| Adelaide Strikers (H) | v | Perth Scorchers |

Adelaide Oval, Adelaide

Match 38
16 January 2027
19:15 (N)
Scorecard

| Melbourne Renegades (H) | v | Melbourne Stars |

Melbourne Cricket Ground, Melbourne

Match 39
17 January 2027
13:40
Scorecard

| Hobart Hurricanes (H) | v | Sydney Sixers |

Bellerive Oval, Hobart

Match 40
17 January 2027
18:15 (N)
Scorecard

| Brisbane Heat (H) | v | Sydney Thunder |

The Gabba, Brisbane

== Play-offs ==
Qualifier
19 January 2027
1 | 1st placed team
2 | 2nd placed team
Knockout
20 January 2027
3 | 3rd placed team
4 | 4th placed team

Challenger
23 January 2027
Loser of Qualifier
Winner of Knockout

Final
26 January 2027
Winner of Qualifier
Winner of Challenger

=== Qualifier ===
19 January 2027
Scorecard

| 1st placed team | v | 2nd placed team |

TBC

=== Knockout ===
20 January 2027
Scorecard

| 3rd placed team | v | 4th placed team |

TBC

=== Challenger ===
23 January 2027
Scorecard

| Loser of Qualifier | v | Winner of Knockout |

TBC

=== Final ===
26 January 2027
Scorecard

| Winner of Qualifier | v | Winner of Challenger |

TBC

== See also ==
- 2026–27 Women's Big Bash League season

== External link ==
- Official website
