= 2026–27 Hobart Hurricanes season =

Australian cricket team season

Hobart Hurricanes
2026–27 season
- Coach: Jeff Vaughan
- Captain(s): Nathan Ellis
- Home ground: Bellerive Oval
- League: BBL
- BBL season: -
- BBL finals: -

The 2026–27 Hobart Hurricanes season will be the sixteenth in the club's history. Coached by Jeff Vaughan and captained by Nathan Ellis, the club will compete in the 2026–27 Big Bash League season.

== Background ==
The Hobart Hurricanes are an Australian men's professional Twenty20 franchise cricket team that competes in the Big Bash League. The Hurricanes wear a purple uniform and are based in Hobart in the Australian state of Tasmania. Their home ground is the Bellerive Oval.

Adam Zampa signed a two-year contract with the Hobart Hurricanes

== Current squads ==
As of 15 October 2026

- Players with international caps are listed in **bold**.

Hobert Hurricane 2026/27
No.	Name	Nat.	Birth Date	Batting Style	Bowling Style	Additional Info.
Batters
8	**Tim David**	Australia	16 March 1996 (age 30)	Right-handed	Right-arm off spin	
32	Nick Hobson	Australia	22 August 1994 (age 32)	Left-handed	Right-arm medium	
61	Tim Ward	Australia	16 February 1998 (age 28)	Left-handed	Right-arm off spin	
11	**Jake Weatherald**	Australia	4 November 1994 (age 31)	Left-handed	Right-arm leg spin	
All Rounders
4	**Nikhil Chaudhary**	Australia	4 May 1996 (age 30)	Right-handed	Right-arm leg spin	
16	**Mitchell Owen**	Australia	16 September 2001 (age 25)	Right-handed	Right-arm medium	
20	**Beau Webster**	Australia	1 December 1993 (age 32)	Right-handed	Right-arm medium	
Wicket-keepers
47	**Shai Hope**	West Indies	10 November 1993 (age 32)	Right-handed	—N/a	International Signing
28	**Ben McDermott**	Australia	12 December 1994 (age 31)	Right-handed	—N/a	
Bowlers
7	Marcus Bean	Australia	5 January 2004 (age 22)	Left-handed	Left-arm medium-fast	
35	Iain Carlisle	Australia	5 January 2000 (age 26)	Left-handed	Right-arm medium	
72	**Nathan Ellis**	Australia	22 September 1994 (age 32)	Right-handed	Right-arm medium	Captain
2	**Rishad Hossain**	Bangladesh	15 July 2002 (age 24)	Right-handed	Right-arm leg spin	International Signing
21	**Riley Meredith**	Australia	21 June 1996 (age 30)	Right-handed	Right-arm fast	
80	Will Prestwidge	Australia	15 January 2002 (age 24)	Left-handed	Right-arm fast	
37	**Billy Stanlake**	Australia	4 November 1994 (age 31)	Left-handed	Right-arm fast	
88	**Adam Zampa**	Australia	31 March 1992 (age 34)	Right-handed	Right-arm leg spin	

== Fixtures ==
On 14 July 2026, Cricket Australia confirmed the full schedule for the tournament

Match 4
17 December 2026
19:15 (N)
Scorecard

Hobart Hurricanes (H)	v	Brisbane Heat

Bellerive Oval, Hobart

Match 7
20 December 2026
16:15 (N)
Scorecard

Perth Scorchers (H)	v	Hobart Hurricanes

Perth Stadium, Perth

Match 11
24 December 2026
19:15 (N)
Scorecard

Melbourne Renegades (H)	v	Hobart Hurricanes

Junction Oval, Melbourne

Match 16
29 December 2026
19:15 (N)
Scorecard

Hobart Hurricanes (H)	v	Melbourne Stars

Bellerive Oval, Hobart

Match 20
1 January 2027
18:15 (N)
Scorecard

Brisbane Heat (H)	v	Hobart Hurricanes

The Gabba, Brisbane

Match 25
5 January 2027
19:15 (N)
Scorecard

Hobart Hurricanes (H)	v	Sydney Thunder

Bellerive Oval, Hobart

Match 29
9 January 2027
19:15 (N)
Scorecard

Hobart Hurricanes (H)	v	Adelaide Strikers

York Park, Launceston

Match 33
12 January 2027
18:45 (N)
Scorecard

Adelaide Strikers (H)	v	Hobart Hurricanes

Adelaide Oval, Adelaide

Match 35
14 January 2027
19:15 (N)
Scorecard

Melbourne Stars (H)	v	Hobart Hurricanes

Melbourne Cricket Ground, Melbourne

Match 39
17 January 2027
13:40
Scorecard

Hobart Hurricanes (H)	v	Sydney Sixers

Bellerive Oval, Hobart

== Standing ==
=== Points table ===
Pos	Team	Pld	W	L	NR	Pts	NRR	Qualification
1	Adelaide Strikers	0	0	0	0	0	—	Advanced to the Qualifier
2	Brisbane Heat	0	0	0	0	0	—	Advanced to the Qualifier
3	Hobart Hurricanes	0	0	0	0	0	—	Advanced to the Knockout
4	Melbourne Renegades	0	0	0	0	0	—	Advanced to the Knockout
5	Melbourne Stars	0	0	0	0	0	—	
6	Perth Scorchers	0	0	0	0	0	—	
7	Sydney Sixers	0	0	0	0	0	—	
8	Sydney Thunder	0	0	0	0	0	—	

Source: Cricinfo

=== Match summary ===
Team	League matches										Finals		
Team	1	2	3	4	5	6	7	8	9	10	QF/KO	Ch	F
Hobart Hurricanes													

Win	Loss	Tie	No result

== Administration and support staff ==
Position	Name
Head Coach	(Australia) Jeff Vaughan
Batting Coach	(Australia) Jimmy Adams
Bowling Coach	(Australia) Shawn Bradstreet
Head of Strategy	(Australia) Ricky Ponting
General Manager	(Australia) Salliann Beams
