= Australian cricket team in Bangladesh in 2026 =

International cricket tour

Australia tour of Bangladesh, 2026
| | Bangladesh | Australia |
- Dates: 9 June – 21 June 2026
| Captains | Mehidy Hasan Miraz (Note: Najmul Hossain Shanto captained Bangladesh in the 3rd ODI.) (ODIs) Litton Das (Note: Tawhid Hridoy captained Bangladesh in the 1st T20I.) (T20Is) | Josh Inglis (ODIs) Mitchell Marsh (T20Is) |

One Day International series
- Results: Bangladesh won the 3-match series 2–1
| Most runs | Mosaddek Hossain (157) | Cooper Connolly (184) |
| Most wickets | Shoriful Islam (6); Mustafizur Rahman (6) | Matt Renshaw (5) |
- Player of the series: Mosaddek Hossain (Ban)

Twenty20 International series
- Results: Australia won the 3-match series 3–0
| Most runs | Towhid Hridoy (104) | Matt Renshaw (113) |
| Most wickets | Nasum Ahmed (3); Abdul Gaffar Saqlain (3) | Adam Zampa (6) |
- Player of the series: Matt Renshaw (Aus)

The Australian cricket team toured Bangladesh to play the Bangladesh cricket team. The tour consisted of three ODI and three T20I matches. In April 2026, the Bangladesh Cricket Board (BCB) confirmed the fixtures for the tour. It was Australia's first ODI tour to Bangladesh in 15 years.

== Squads ==
| Bangladesh | | Australia | |
| ODIs | T20Is | ODIs | T20Is |
|---|---|---|---|
| Mehidy Hasan Miraz (c); Najmul Hossain Shanto (vc); Taskin Ahmed; Litton Das (wk); Nurul Hasan (wk); Tanzid Hasan; Saif Hassan; Tawhid Hridoy; Mosaddek Hossain; Rishad Hossain; Shoriful Islam; Tanvir Islam; Soumya Sarkar; Mustafizur Rahman; Nahid Rana | Litton Das (c, wk); Tawhid Hridoy (vc); Nasum Ahmed; Taskin Ahmed; Parvez Hossain Emon; Tanzid Hasan; Soumya Sarkar; Saif Hassan; Shamim Hossain; Nurul Hasan (wk); Mahedi Hasan; Rishad Hossain; Shoriful Islam; Mustafizur Rahman; Nahid Rana; Abdul Gaffar Saqlain | ~~Mitchell Marsh (c)~~; Josh Inglis (c, wk); Xavier Bartlett; Alex Carey (wk); Cooper Connolly; Ben Dwarshuis; Nathan Ellis; Cameron Green; ~~Travis Head~~; Matthew Kuhnemann; Marnus Labuschagne; Riley Meredith; Oliver Peake; Matthew Renshaw; Liam Scott; Adam Zampa; ~~Tanveer Sangha~~ | Mitchell Marsh (c); Xavier Bartlett; Nikhil Chaudhary; Cooper Connolly; Tim David; Joel Davies; Nathan Ellis; ~~Cameron Green~~; Aaron Hardie; ~~Travis Head~~; Josh Inglis (wk); Spencer Johnson; Matthew Kuhnemann; Riley Meredith; Josh Philippe (wk); Matthew Renshaw; Adam Zampa |

On 8 June 2026, Mitchell Marsh was ruled out of the ODI series and replaced as skipper by Josh Inglis in the Australian team. On the same date Todd Murphy was added to the Australian squad as a replacement for Tanveer Sangha. On 11 June, Nikhil Chaudhary was added to the Australian squad for the T20I series, replacing Travis Head, who withdrew due to personal leave. Cameron Green was withdrawn from the T20 series following the 3rd ODI on 14 June.

== ODI series ==
=== 1st ODI ===
9 June 2026
14:00 (BST) (D/N)
Scorecard

| Bangladesh; 284/8 (50 overs) | v | Australia; 191/9 (42.2 overs) |
| Mosaddek Hossain 86* (70); Nathan Ellis 3/38 (10 overs) | | Cameron Green 52* (66); Nahid Rana 4/41 (10 overs) |

Bangladesh won by 86 runs (DLS method)
Sher-e-Bangla National Cricket Stadium, Dhaka
Umpires: Gazi Sohel (Ban) and Alex Wharf (Eng)
Player of the match: Mosaddek Hossain (Ban)

- Australia won the toss and elected to field.
- Australia innings curtailed at 43 overs due to lightning; DLS par score was 198.
- Liam Scott (Aus) made his ODI debut.
- This was Bangladesh's first win at home against Australia in ODIs.

=== 2nd ODI ===
11 June 2026
14:00 (BST) (D/N)
Scorecard

| Australia; 187/8 (42 overs) | v | Bangladesh; 195/5 (35 overs) |
| Marnus Labuschagne 55* (85); Mustafizur Rahman 3/27 (7 overs) | | Soumya Sarkar 42 (47); Cameron Green 2/9 (2 overs) |

Bangladesh won by 5 wickets (DLS method)
Sher-e-Bangla National Cricket Stadium, Dhaka
Umpires: Tanvir Ahmed (Ban) and Ahsan Raza (Pak)
Player of the match: Mustafizur Rahman (Ban)

- Australia won the toss and elected to bat.
- Australia innings curtailed at 42 overs due to rain.
- Bangladesh were set a revised target of 192 runs from 41 overs.
- This was Bangladesh's first ODI series win against Australia.

=== 3rd ODI ===
14 June 2026
14:00 (BST) (D/N)
Scorecard

| Bangladesh; 274/5 (50 overs) | v | Australia; 277/9 (49.3 overs) |
| Towhid Hridoy 83 (88); Matt Renshaw 2/44 (9 overs) | | Cooper Connolly 149 (134); Shoriful Islam 6/48 (10 overs) |

Australia won by 1 wicket
Sher-e-Bangla National Cricket Stadium, Dhaka
Umpires: Masudur Rahman (Ban) and Alex Wharf (Eng)
Player of the match: Cooper Connolly (Aus)

- Bangladesh won the toss and elected to bat.
- Cooper Connolly (Aus) scored his maiden century in ODIs.
- Shoriful Islam (Ban) took his maiden five-wicket haul in ODIs.

== T20I series ==
=== 1st T20I ===
17 June 2026
14:00 (BST)
Scorecard

| Bangladesh; 131 (19 overs) | v | Australia; 133/6 (18.2 overs) |
| Mahedi Hasan 29* (22); Joel Davies 3/17 (3 overs) | | Cooper Connolly 47 (27); Abdul Gaffar Saqlain 2/32 (3.2 overs) |

Australia won by 4 wickets
Bir Shrestho Flight Lieutenant Matiur Rahman Cricket Stadium, Chittagong
Umpires: Masudur Rahman (Ban) and Sharfuddoula (Ban)
Player of the match: Adam Zampa (Aus)

- Bangladesh won the toss and elected to bat.
- Joel Davies, Nikhil Chaudhary (Aus), and Abdul Gaffar Saqlain (Ban) made their T20I debuts.

=== 2nd T20I ===
19 June 2026
14:00 (BST)
Scorecard

| Australia; 196/5 (20 overs) | v | Bangladesh; 189/6 (20 overs) |
| Matt Renshaw 89* (52); Nasum Ahmed 2/27 (4 overs) | | Saif Hassan 42 (33); Aaron Hardie 2/40 (4 overs) |

Australia won by 7 runs
Bir Shrestho Flight Lieutenant Matiur Rahman Cricket Stadium, Chittagong
Umpires: Tanvir Ahmed (Ban) and Sharfuddoula (Ban)
Player of the match: Matt Renshaw (Aus)

- Australia won the toss and elected to bat.

=== 3rd T20I ===
21 June 2026
14:00 (BST)
Scorecard

| Bangladesh; 109/8 (20 overs) | v | Australia; 112/3 (11 overs) |
| Towhid Hridoy 61* (51); Spencer Johnson 2/6 (4 overs) | | Mitchell Marsh 60 (28); Nasum Ahmed 1/10 (3 overs) |

Australia won by 7 wickets
Bir Shrestho Flight Lieutenant Matiur Rahman Cricket Stadium, Chittagong
Umpires: Morshed Ali Khan (Ban) and Gazi Sohel (Ban)
Player of the match: Mitchell Marsh (Aus)

- Bangladesh won the toss and elected to bat.

== See also ==
- Bangladeshi cricket team in Australia in 2026 (Test series)
