= 2019–20 Sheffield Shield season =

Cricket tournament

2019–20 Sheffield Shield
- Dates: 10 October 2019 – 31 March 2020
- Administrator: Cricket Australia
- Cricket format: First-class
- Tournament format(s): Double round-robin and final
- Champions: New South Wales (47th title)
- Participants: 6
- Matches: 27
- Player of the series: Moises Henriques (New South Wales) & Nic Maddinson (Victoria)
- Most runs: Nic Maddinson (Victoria) (780)
- Most wickets: Cameron Gannon (Queensland) (38)

The 2019–20 Sheffield Shield season was the 118th season of the Sheffield Shield, the Australian domestic first-class cricket competition. It began on 10 October 2019 and was scheduled to finish on 31 March 2020. The first four rounds took place prior to the international Test series against Pakistan, and in addition the season breaks for the Big Bash League. Victoria were the defending champions.

In December 2019, during the sixth round match between Victoria and Western Australia at the Melbourne Cricket Ground, play was suspended after 40 overs on the first day due to a dangerous pitch. Following another inspection on the second day, the match was called off. During the same round, the match at the Sydney Cricket Ground between New South Wales and Queensland was played under a smoke cloud from the Australian bushfires.

The final round of matches and the final were cancelled due to the COVID-19 pandemic. The title was subsequently awarded to New South Wales, who finished on top of the points table after the nine rounds that were played. It was the 47th time that New South Wales had won the title. On 25 March 2020, Cricket Australia named Moises Henriques and Nic Maddinson as the joint winners of player of the season.

== Points table ==
Team	Pld	W	L	D	NR	BP	Pts
New South Wales	9	6	2	1	0	13.76	50.76
Victoria	9	3	3	2	1	15.53	38.53
Queensland	9	4	3	2	0	10.91	36.91
Tasmania	9	3	4	2	0	12.29	32.29
Western Australia	9	2	3	3	1	13.37	31.37
South Australia	9	2	5	2	0	14.54	28.54

== Fixtures ==
=== Round 1 ===
10–13 October 2019
Scorecard

(home team) Victoria	v	South Australia
6/616d (150 overs); Nic Maddinson 224 (328); Tom Andrews 2/130 (34 overs)		6/671 (186 overs); Tom Cooper 271* (347); Chris Tremain 2/56 (26 overs)

Match drawn
Junction Oval, Melbourne
Umpires: Geoff Joshua, Simon Fry
Player of the match: Tom Cooper (South Australia)

- Victoria won the toss and elected to bat
- Henry Hunt (South Australia) made his first-class debut.

10–13 October 2019
Scorecard

(home team) Queensland	v	New South Wales
153 (71 overs); Marnus Labuschagne 69 (140); Harry Conway 5/17 (13 overs)		9/288d (88 overs); David Warner 125 (221); Cameron Gannon 5/94 (25 overs)
268 (91.5 overs); Joe Burns 52 (105); Harry Conway 5/39 (17.5 overs)		5/134 (41.5 overs); Daniel Hughes 66* (109); Michael Neser 3/42 (11 overs)

New South Wales won by 5 wickets
The Gabba, Brisbane
Umpires: Gerard Abood, Donovan Koch
Player of the match: Harry Conway (New South Wales)

- Queensland won the toss and elected to bat

10–13 October 2019
Scorecard

(home team) Western Australia	v	Tasmania
337 (85.5 overs); Marcus Stoinis 61 (101); Jackson Bird 3/51 (21 overs)		397 (142 overs); Tim Paine 121 (208); Jhye Richardson 3/58 (31 overs)
9/383d (113 overs); Shaun Marsh 85 (168); Jackson Bird 5/78 (27 overs)

Match drawn
WACA, Perth
Umpires: Paul Wilson and Nathan Johnstone
Player of the match: Jackson Bird (Tasmania)

- Western Australia won the toss and elected to bat.
- Lawrence Neil-Smith (Tasmania) made his first-class debut.

=== Round 2 ===
18–21 October 2019
Scorecard

Tasmania	v	New South Wales (home team)
268 (101.3 overs); Beau Webster 65 (164); Mitchell Starc 5/40 (24.3 overs)		364 (117.4 overs); Moises Henriques 124 (190); Riley Meredith 5/98 (29 overs)
140 (62.5 overs); Matthew Wade 40 (113); Mitchell Starc 5/20 (19.5 overs)		2/46 (8.2 overs); Daniel Hughes 25 (23); Alex Pyecroft 2/9 (2.2 overs)

New South Wales won by 8 wickets
Drummoyne Oval, Sydney
Umpires: Phillip Gillespie and Michael Graham-Smith
Player of the match: Mitchell Starc (New South Wales)

- Tasmania won the toss and elected to bat.

18–21 October 2019
Scorecard

South Australia	v	Queensland (home team)
221 (66.2 overs); Tom Andrews 78 (111); Michael Neser 5/56 (20.2 overs)		264 (98.4 overs); Charlie Hemphrey 64 (141); Wes Agar 4/30 (19.4 overs)
192 (61.4 overs); Chadd Sayers 42 (32); Xavier Bartlett 3/33 (13 overs)		6/150 (39.4 overs); Marnus Labuschagne 72* (83); Nicholas Winter 4/37 (11 overs)

Queensland won by 4 wickets
The Gabba, Brisbane
Umpires: Greg Davidson and Shawn Craig
Player of the match: Marnus Labuschagne (Queensland)

- South Australia won the toss and elected to bat
- Bryce Street, Xavier Bartlett (Queensland) and Wes Agar (South Australia) all made their first-class debuts.

18–21 October 2019
Scorecard

Victoria	v	Western Australia (home team)
341 (114.3 overs); Sam Harper 72 (122); Jhye Richardson 3/58 (28 overs)		9/519d (152.3 overs); Shaun Marsh 214 (436); James Pattinson 4/117 (31 overs)
186 (73.1 overs); Glenn Maxwell 57 (76); Marcus Stoinis 3/33 (12 overs)		1/9 (3.2 overs); Sam Whiteman 6* (12); Scott Boland 1/4 (2 overs)

Western Australia won by 9 wickets
WACA, Perth
Umpires: Gerard Abood and Tony Wilds
Player of the match: Shaun Marsh (Western Australia)

- Victoria won the toss and elected to bat.

=== Round 3 ===
31 October–3 November 2019
Scorecard

Victoria	v	Tasmania (home team)
127 (41.5 overs); Nic Maddinson 69 (68); Alex Pyecroft 3/16 (8 overs)		226 (82.5 overs); Matthew Wade 69 (179); Chris Tremain 4/45 (23.5 overs)
237 (85.2 overs); Marcus Harris 60 (97); Jackson Bird 4/65 (27 overs)		4/144 (45.2 overs); Matthew Wade 57* (92); Peter Siddle 2/23 (14 overs)

Tasmania won by 6 wickets
Blundstone Arena, Hobart
Umpires: Greg Davidson and Donovan Koch
Player of the match: Matthew Wade (Tasmania)

- Tasmania won the toss and elected to field.

1–4 November 2019
Scorecard

New South Wales	v	South Australia (home team)
289 (104.3 overs); Daniel Solway 133* (303); Chadd Sayers 8/64 (27.3 overs)		245 (100.2 overs); Travis Head 109 (214); Harry Conway 3/55 (19 overs)
253 (72.2 overs); Nick Larkin 91 (143); Chadd Sayers 5/67 (18.2 overs)		201 (67.4 overs); Tom Cooper 77 (133); Josh Hazlewood 6/35 (18.4 overs)

New South Wales won by 96 runs
Adelaide Oval, Adelaide
Umpires: Geoff Joshua and John Ward
Player of the match: Chadd Sayers (South Australia)

- South Australia won the toss and elected to field.
- Matthew Gilkes and Daniel Solway (New South Wales) made their first-class debuts.
- Daniel Solway scored his maiden century in first-class cricket.

2–5 November 2019
Scorecard

Western Australia	v	Queensland (home team)
332 (121.4 overs); Cameron Green 87* (167); Cameron Gannon 4/79 (25 overs)		411 (135.2 overs); Bryce Street 115 (308); Marcus Stoinis 3/50 (21.2 overs)
9/246 (100 overs); Cameron Green 121* (172); Cameron Gannon 4/39 (27 overs)

Match drawn
The Gabba, Brisbane
Umpires: Michael Graham-Smith and Simon Fry
Player of the match: Cameron Green (Western Australia)

- Queensland won the toss and elected to field.
- Bryce Street (Queensland) scored his maiden century in first-class cricket.
- Cameron Green (Western Australia) scored his maiden century in first-class cricket.

=== Round 4 ===
11–14 November 2019
Scorecard

(home team) New South Wales	v	Western Australia
8/444d (152 overs); Steve Smith 103 (295); D'Arcy Short 2/39 (11 overs)		191 (95.4 overs); D'Arcy Short 51 (164); Pat Cummins 3/31 (15 overs)
0/98d (17 overs); Daniel Hughes 53* (48)		128 (64.3 overs); Josh Inglis 46 (104); Mitchell Starc 4/57 (17 overs)

New South Wales won by 223 runs
Sydney Cricket Ground, Sydney
Umpires: Greg Davidson and Simon Lightbody
Player of the match: Moises Henriques (New South Wales)

- New South Wales won the toss and elected to bat.

11–14 November 2019
Scorecard

(home team) South Australia	v	Tasmania
6/490d (124 overs); Jake Weatherald 198 (282); Sam Rainbird 2/95 (24 overs)		5/345d (136 overs); Alex Doolan 170* (403); Tom Cooper 3/76 (24 overs)
5/191d (30 overs); Callum Ferguson 82 (84); Alex Pyecroft 2/29 (4 overs)		8/308 (90 overs); Alex Doolan 116 (201); Wes Agar 3/49 (18 overs)

Match drawn
Adelaide Oval, Adelaide
Umpires: Phillip Gillespie and Tony Wilds
Player of the match: Alex Doolan (Tasmania)

- South Australia won the toss and elected to bat.
- Henry Hunt (South Australia) scored his maiden century in first-class cricket.
- Henry Hunt and Jake Weatherald set a new record for the highest opening partnership for South Australia in first-class cricket, with 293 runs.
- Alex Doolan became the seventh batsman for Tasmania to score a century in each innings in a first-class match.

12–15 November 2019
Scorecard

Queensland	v	Victoria (home team)
183 (75 overs); Charlie Hemphrey 64 (130); Jon Holland 3/29 (14 overs)		9/300d (111.5 overs); Peter Handscomb 92 (199); Mitchell Swepson 4/75 (25.5 overs)
306 (117 overs); Mark Steketee 52 (76); James Pattinson 4/66 (28 overs)		130 (73.5 overs); Matthew Short 27 (55); Mitchell Swepson 3/17 (17.5 overs)

Queensland won by 59 runs
Melbourne Cricket Ground, Melbourne
Umpires: Shawn Craig and John Ward
Player of the match: Mitchell Swepson (Queensland)

- Victoria won the toss and elected to field.
- Jake Fraser-McGurk, Will Sutherland (Victoria) and Blake Edwards (Queensland) all made their first-class debuts.
- Mitchell Swepson (Queensland) took a hat-trick in the first innings.

=== Round 5 ===
29 November–2 December 2019
Scorecard

New South Wales	v	Victoria (home team)
294 (120.2 overs); Sean Abbott 54 (118); Peter Siddle 3/52 (26 overs)		7/307d (115 overs); Will Pucovski 82 (257); Steve O'Keefe 5/80 (33 overs)
0/129 (60 overs); Nick Larkin 68* (185)

Match drawn
Melbourne Cricket Ground, Melbourne
Umpires: Gerard Abood and Michael Graham-Smith
Player of the match: Steve O'Keefe (New South Wales)

- Victoria won the toss and elected to field.

29 November–2 December 2019
Scorecard

(home team) Tasmania	v	Queensland
107 (40.5 overs); Alex Doolan 34 (85); Mark Steketee 5/19 (14 overs)		240 (81.3 overs); Sam Heazlett 135 (198); Jackson Bird 3/55 (26 overs)
150 (55.3 overs); George Bailey 82 (157); Mark Steketee 4/32 (13 overs)		0/18 (5.3 overs); Matt Renshaw 10* (14)

Queensland won by 10 wickets
Blundstone Arena, Hobart
Umpires: Darren Close and Sam Nogajski
Player of the match: Sam Heazlett (Queensland)

- Queensland won the toss and elected to field.
- Macalister Wright (Tasmania) made his first-class debut.
- Mark Steketee (Queensland) took his first five-wicket haul in first-class cricket.

29 November–2 December 2019
Scorecard

(home team) Western Australia	v	South Australia
8/492d (145.1 overs); Cameron Green 126 (194); Adam Zampa 3/121 (30.1 overs)		353 (99 overs); Alex Carey 143 (200); Marcus Stoinis 3/42 (21 overs)
6/205d (58 overs); Shaun Marsh 102* (150); Chadd Sayers 2/39 (17 overs)		308 (68.5 overs); Callum Ferguson 123 (154); Matthew Kelly 6/69 (18.5 overs)

Western Australia won by 36 runs
WACA, Perth
Umpires: Simon Fry and Donovan Koch

- Western Australia won the toss and elected to bat.
- Liam Scott (South Australia) made his first-class debut.

=== Round 6 ===
7–10 December 2019
Scorecard

Western Australia	v	Victoria (home team)
3/89 (39.4 overs); Jake Carder 44 (103); Peter Siddle 3/21 (14 overs)

No result
Melbourne Cricket Ground, Melbourne
Umpires: Phillip Gillespie and Geoff Joshua

- Victoria won the toss and elected to field.
- Play was suspended after 40 overs on day 1 due to a dangerous pitch.
- Umpires called off the match on day 2 due to the dangerous conditions of the pitch.

7–10 December 2019
Scorecard

Queensland	v	New South Wales (home team)
240 (90 overs); Bryce Street 58 (200); Harry Conway 5/15 (15 overs)		375 (138.5 overs); Moises Henriques 116 (158); Michael Neser 4/60 (30.5 overs)
176 (74.5 overs); Usman Khawaja 54 (127); Steve O'Keefe 3/28 (17.5 overs)		1/42 (11.3 overs); Daniel Hughes 27 (44); Mitchell Swepson 1/27 (6 overs)

New South Wales won by 9 wickets
Sydney Cricket Ground, Sydney
Umpires: Greg Davidson and Tony Wilds
Player of the match: Moises Henriques (New South Wales)

- Queensland won the toss and elected to bat.

7–10 December 2019
Scorecard

(home team) Tasmania	v	South Australia
254 (79.2 overs); Simon Milenko 100 (134); Wes Agar 3/68 (22 overs)		346 (96 overs); Jake Weatherald 126 (228); Jackson Bird 4/70 (27 overs)
261 (107.3 overs); Ben McDermott 89 (236); Wes Agar 5/53 (24.3 overs)		4/170 (48.5 overs); Harry Nielsen 86* (109); Gabe Bell 2/32 (14 overs)

South Australia won by 6 wickets
Blundstone Arena, Hobart
Umpires: Gerard Abood and Simon Fry
Player of the match: Wes Agar (South Australia)

- South Australia won the toss and elected to field.
- Daniel Drew (South Australia) made his first-class debut.
- Simon Milenko (Tasmania) scored his maiden century in first-class cricket.

=== Round 7 ===
14–17 February 2020
Scorecard

Victoria	v	New South Wales (home team)
7/431d (123 overs); Seb Gotch 100* (241); Nathan Lyon 3/113 (36 overs)		310 (116.2 overs); Kurtis Patterson 54 (107); Wil Parker 3/54 (25 overs)
1/168d (30 overs); Nic Maddinson 105* (90); Harry Conway 1/33 (7 overs)		177 (65.5 overs); Daniel Solway 66 (153); Peter Siddle 5/49 (18 overs)

Victoria won by 112 runs
Sydney Cricket Ground, Sydney
Umpires: Stephen Harris and Shawn Craig
Player of the match: Nic Maddinson (Victoria)

- Victoria won the toss and elected to bat.
- Wil Parker (Victoria) made his first-class debut.
- Seb Gotch (Victoria) scored his maiden century in first-class cricket.

14–17 February 2020
Scorecard

(home team) South Australia	v	Western Australia
389 (101.3 overs); Tom Cooper 99 (136); David Moody 4/86 (23 overs)		254 (130.4 overs); Shaun Marsh 63 (111); Chadd Sayers 4/54 (31.4 overs)
5/196d (48 overs); Travis Head 49 (50); Matthew Kelly 3/44 (12 overs)		222 (67 overs); Marcus Stoinis 60 (84); Daniel Worrall 5/31 (18 overs)

South Australia won by 109 runs
Adelaide Oval, Adelaide
Umpires: Michael Graham-Smith and Virender Sharma
Player of the match: Daniel Worrall (South Australia)

- Western Australia won the toss and elected to field.

14–17 February 2020
Scorecard

Tasmania	v	Queensland (home team)
78 (37.2 overs); Charlie Wakim 11 (50); Michael Neser 4/18 (12 overs)		257 (111.5 overs); Usman Khawaja 56 (173); Jackson Bird 4/68 (25 overs)
236 (89 overs); Ben McDermott 69 (189); Michael Neser 3/48 (21 overs)		0/58 (10 overs); Joe Burns 46* (35)

Queensland won by 10 wickets
The Gabba, Brisbane
Umpires: John Ward and Ashley Mehrotra
Player of the match: Michael Neser (Queensland)

- Queensland won the toss and elected to field.
- Tasmania’s first-innings total of 78 was their third-lowest first-class score.

=== Round 8 ===
24–27 February 2020
Scorecard

(home team) New South Wales	v	South Australia
373 (121.4 overs); Daniel Hughes 103 (191); Joe Mennie 6/103 (31 overs)		207 (91.1 overs); Callum Ferguson 44 (94); Trent Copeland 5/63 (25 overs)
2/236d (51 overs); Daniel Hughes 136 (170); Chadd Sayers 1/45 (9 overs)		269 (95 overs); Callum Ferguson 82 (193); Trent Copeland 4/60 (28 overs)

New South Wales won by 133 runs
Bankstown Oval, Sydney
Umpires: Shawn Craig and Simon Fry
Player of the match: Daniel Hughes (New South Wales)

- New South Wales won the toss and elected to bat.

24–27 February 2020
Scorecard

Western Australia	v	Tasmania (home team)
371 (114.4 overs); Cameron Green 158* (283); Sam Rainbird 5/77 (30 overs)		390 (112.4 overs); Beau Webster 187 (187); Joel Paris 5/90 (26.4 overs)
253 (82.5 overs); Joel Paris 93 (163); Nathan Ellis 6/86 (26.5 overs)		5/235 (60 overs); Jake Doran 63 (103); Joel Paris 2/58 (17 overs)

Tasmania won by 5 wickets
Blundstone Arena, Hobart
Umpires: Phillip Gillespie and Stephen Harris
Player of the match: Beau Webster (Tasmania)

- Tasmania won the toss and elected to field.
- Nathan Ellis (Tasmania) made his first-class debut.

24–27 February 2020
Scorecard

Victoria	v	Queensland (home team)
9/330d (76.2 overs); Seb Gotch 102* (162); Xavier Bartlett 5/85 (21 overs)		184 (76.5 overs); Lachlan Pfeffer 50 (101); Will Sutherland 5/34 (16.5 overs)
8/208d (72 overs); Travis Dean 96 (196); Cameron Gannon 4/40 (18 overs)		310 (115.1 overs); Joe Burns 135 (197); Scott Boland 4/62 (29.1 overs)

Victoria won by 44 runs
The Gabba, Brisbane
Umpires: Geoff Joshua and Virender Sharma
Player of the match: Seb Gotch (Victoria)

- Queensland won the toss and elected to field.
- Max Bryant (Queensland) and Jonathan Merlo (Victoria) both made their first-class debuts.
- Will Sutherland (Victoria) took his maiden five-wicket haul in first-class cricket.

=== Round 9 ===
6–9 March 2020
Scorecard

New South Wales	v	Tasmania (home team)
195 (68.4 overs); Nick Larkin 45 (113); Nathan Ellis 6/43 (20 overs)		270 (82.4 overs); Charlie Wakim 78 (145); Sean Abbott 4/52 (23 overs)
203 (68.3 overs); Kurtis Patterson 46 (97); Nathan Ellis 3/52 (19 overs)		1/132 (40.3 overs); Jordan Silk 67* (129); Nathan Lyon 1/25 (6.3 overs)

Tasmania won by 9 wickets
Blundstone Arena, Hobart
Umpires: John Ward and Simon Fry
Player of the match: Nathan Ellis (Tasmania)

- Tasmania won the toss and elected to field.

6–9 March 2020
Scorecard

Victoria	v	South Australia (home team)
292 (88.4 overs); Nic Maddinson 66 (114); Joe Mennie 4/54 (20.4 overs)		214 (67.2 overs); Jake Weatherald 67 (146); Peter Siddle 3/27 (13 overs)
6/320d (89.1 overs); Travis Dean 92 (199); Wes Agar 3/62 (18.1 overs)		216 (71.4 overs); Travis Head 60 (101); Will Sutherland 6/67 (17.4 overs)

Victoria won by 182 runs
Adelaide Oval, Adelaide
Umpires: Sam Nogajski and Donovan Koch
Player of the match: Will Sutherland (Victoria)

- South Australia won the toss and elected to field.

6–9 March 2020
Scorecard

(home team) Western Australia	v	Queensland
277 (86.2 overs); Sam Whiteman 51 (129); Cameron Gannon 4/65 (18 overs)		496 (139.2 overs); Bryce Street 115 (281); Matthew Kelly 5/85 (31.2 overs)
347 (121.5 overs); Sam Whiteman 110 (270); Michael Neser 3/59 (26.5 overs)		5/54 (16 overs); Jimmy Peirson 17* (33); Matthew Kelly 3/11 (7 overs)

Match drawn
WACA, Perth
Umpires: Geoff Joshua and Tony Wilds
Player of the match: Sam Whiteman (Western Australia)

- Queensland won the toss and elected to field.
- Aaron Hardie (Western Australia) scored his maiden century in first-class cricket.

=== Round 10 ===
17–20 March 2020
Scorecard

(home team) South Australia	v	Queensland

Cancelled
Karen Rolton Oval, Adelaide

17–20 March 2020
Scorecard

(home team) Western Australia	v	New South Wales
498; 300; 10

Cancelled
WACA, Perth

22-25 March 2020
Scorecard

(home team) Victoria	v	Tasmania

Cancelled
Junction Oval, Melbourne

== Final ==
27–31 March 2020
Scorecard

v

Cancelled
North Dalton Park, Wollongong

== Statistics ==
=== Most runs ===
Player	Team	Mat	Inns	NO	Runs	Ave	HS	100	50
Nic Maddinson	Victoria	7	10	1	780	86.67	224	2	5
Tom Cooper	South Australia	8	15	1	765	54.64	271*	1	4
Shaun Marsh	Western Australia	9	17	2	724	48.27	214	2	3
Cameron Green	Western Australia	8	15	4	699	63.55	158*	3	1
Daniel Hughes	New South Wales	9	18	3	665	44.33	136	2	3

=== Most wickets ===
Player	Team	Mat	Inns	Overs	Wkts	Ave	Econ	BBI	BBM	5	10
Cameron Gannon	Queensland	8	16	295.0	38	20.92	2.69	5/94	8/118	1	0
Michael Neser	Queensland	6	12	238.2	33	17.30	2.39	5/56	7/66	1	0
Wes Agar	South Australia	8	16	291.0	33	24.21	2.74	5/53	8/121	1	0
Peter Siddle	Victoria	8	14	278.2	32	19.87	2.28	5/49	7/119	1	0
Chadd Sayers	South Australia	8	16	332.3	31	28.41	2.64	8/64	13/131	2	1

== Broadcasting ==
All Sheffield Shield matches were exclusively streamed live and free on Cricket Australia's official website, with Fox Cricket originally scheduled to show the final.
