= Bangladeshi cricket team in Australia in 2026 =

International cricket tour

	Australia	Bangladesh
- Dates: 13 – 26 August 2026
Captains	Pat Cummins	Najmul Hossain Shanto

Test series
- Result: 2-match series drawn 1–1
Most runs	Cameron Green (184)	Najmul Hossain Shanto (115)
Most wickets	Mitchell Starc (12)	Hasan Mahmud (9)
- Player of the series: Mitchell Starc (Aus)

The Bangladesh cricket team toured Australia in August 2026 to play the Australia cricket team. The tour consisted of two Test matches. The Test series formed part of the 2025–2027 ICC World Test Championship. In February 2026, the Cricket Australia (CA) confirmed the fixtures for the tour.

It was Bangladesh's first tour to Australia in 23 years. The series also marked the first winter Tests in Australia since 2004. Initially, the tour was scheduled to take place in March 2027 but was later moved to 2026 due to fixture congestion with the 150th Anniversary Test against England.

== Squads ==
Australia	Bangladesh
Pat Cummins (c); Steve Smith (vc); Scott Boland; Alex Carey (wk); Cameron Green; Josh Hazlewood; Travis Head; Josh Inglis (wk); Marnus Labuschagne; Nathan Lyon; Matt Renshaw; Mitchell Starc; Jake Weatherald; Beau Webster	Najmul Hossain Shanto (c); Mehidy Hasan Miraz (vc); Khaled Ahmed; Taskin Ahmed; Jaker Ali (wk); Litton Das (wk); Mominul Haque; Amite Hasan (wk); Musfik Hasan; Tanzid Hasan; Ebadot Hossain; Shadman Islam; Taijul Islam; Hasan Mahmud; Mushfiqur Rahim; Soumya Sarkar

On 1 August 2026, after recovering from injury, Litton Das was added to Bangladesh's squad. On 18 August, Matt Renshaw was announced to replace Jake Weatherald in the squad for the second test.

== Tour match ==
Three-day match : Bangladesh vs Cricket Australia XI:

The Bangladesh team played a three-day match against the Australia XI team.

6–8 August 2026
Scorecard

Bangladesh	v	Australia XI
263 (75.5 overs); Mehidy Hasan Miraz 109* (141); Corey Rocchiccioli 6/83 (24 overs)		355 (87.2 overs); Teague Wyllie 130 (177); Hasan Mahmud 4/19 (19 overs)
54 (22 overs); Tanzid Hasan 22 (41); Campbell Thompson 8/25 (11 overs)

Cricket Australia XI won by an innings and 38 runs
Marrara Cricket Ground, Darwin
Umpires: Sam Nogajski (Aus) and Ben Treloar (Aus)

- Bangladesh won the toss and elected to bat.
- Up to 13 players per side (11 batting, 11 fielding).

== Test series ==
=== 1st Test ===
13–16 August 2026 (Note: While five days of play were scheduled for this Test, the test reached a result in four days.)
Scorecard

Australia	v	Bangladesh
198 (53 overs); Steve Smith 71 (109); Hasan Mahmud 6/55 (17 overs)		426 (138 overs); Tanzid Hasan 101 (197); Josh Hazlewood 6/89 (28 overs)
284 (95.1 overs); Cameron Green 104 (201); Mehidy Hasan Miraz 5/66 (33.1 overs)		1/57 (14.2 overs); Mominul Haque 30* (39); Josh Hazlewood 1/5 (3 overs)

Bangladesh won by 9 wickets
Marrara Oval, Darwin
Umpires: Richard Illingworth (Eng) and Kumar Dharmasena (SL)
Player of the match: Hasan Mahmud (Ban)

- Australia won the toss and elected to bat.
- Hasan Mahmud recorded the best bowling figures in an innings (6 for 55) for any Bangladeshi bowler against Australia and recorded the third-best bowling figures by any Bangladeshi pacer. He also recorded the best bowling figures in a match (9 for 111) by a Bangladeshi bowler in Tests played outside Bangladesh.
- 198, scored by Australia in their first innings, is their lowest team total against Bangladesh in Tests.
- Tanzid Hasan (Ban) scored his maiden century in Tests. He also became the first Bangladeshi player to score a Test century in Australia.
- Josh Hazlewood (Aus) took his 300th wicket in Tests.
- Bangladeshi pacers took 14 wickets, the joint most by Bangladeshi pace bowlers in a Test.
- This was Bangladesh's first Test victory against Australia in Australia. Bangladesh are the third-quickest (3 Tests; 23 years) team to win a Test in Australia after England (2 Tests; 21 days) and South Africa (3 Tests; 1 month).
- This is the third Test win as captain for Najmul Hossain Shanto away from home, the most by a Bangladeshi captain.
- World Test Championship points: Bangladesh 12, Australia 0.

=== 2nd Test ===
22–23 August 2026 (Note: While five days of play were scheduled for this Test, the test reached a result in two days.)
Scorecard

Bangladesh	v	Australia
64 (34 overs); Shoriful Islam 14 (19); Mitchell Starc 6/12 (10 overs)		210 (52.3 overs); Cameron Green 67 (105); Shoriful Islam 7/48 (15 overs)
95 (38.3 overs); Najmul Hossain Shanto 31 (46); Mitchell Starc 4/39 (10 overs)

Australia won by an innings and 51 runs
Great Barrier Reef Arena, Mackay
Umpires: Kumar Dharmasena (SL) and Nitin Menon (Ind)
Player of the match: Mitchell Starc (Aus)

- Australia won the toss and elected to field.
- Great Barrier Reef Arena became the 12th Australian venue and the 127th overall to host a men's Test match.
- Mitchell Starc (Aus) surpassed Nathan Lyon to become the highest wicket-taker of all time in the World Test Championship.
- Shoriful Islam (Ban) took his maiden five-wicket haul in Tests. He also recorded the best bowling figure (7 for 48 runs) by any Bangladeshi pacer.
- This was the first time Bangladesh were bowled out below 100 runs in both innings.
- World Test Championship points: Australia 12, Bangladesh 0.

== See also ==
- Australian cricket team in Bangladesh in 2026
