= 2026–27 Melbourne Renegades season =

Australian cricket team season

Melbourne Renegades
2026–27 season
- Coach: Luke Ronchi
- Captain(s): Will Sutherland
- Home ground: Docklands Stadium
- League: Big Bash League
- BBL season: -
- BBL finals: -

The 2026–27 Melbourne Renegades season will be the sixteenth in the club's history. Coached by Luke Ronchi and captained by Will Sutherland, the club will compete in the BBL |16.

== Background ==
The Melbourne Renegades are an Australian men's professional Twenty20 franchise cricket team that competes in the Big Bash League. The Renegades wear a red uniform and are based in Melbourne in the Australian state of Victoria. Their home ground is the Docklands Stadium.

On 10 July 2026, Cricket Australia confirmed that the Melbourne Renegades would face the Perth Scorchers in the opening match of the BBL |16 at the M. A. Chidambaram Stadium in Chennai, India. The fixture marked the first Big Bash League match to be played outside Australia.

Michael Archer joined the Melbourne Renegades becomes the first player to sign on after the lifting of the Big Bash's contract embargo.

Sam Elliott and Callum Stow both re-signing with the club for BBL |16.

== Current squads ==
- Players with international caps are listed in **bold**.

Melbourne Renegades 2026–27
No.	Name	Nat.	Date of birth	Batting style	Bowling style	Notes
Batters
6	Josh Brown	Australia	26 December 1993 (age 32)	Right-handed	Right-arm off spin	
22	Harry Dixon	Australia	16 February 2005 (age 21)	Left-handed	Right-arm off spin	
23	**Jake Fraser-McGurk**	Australia	11 April 2002 (age 24)	Right-handed	Right arm leg spin	
32	Caleb Jewell	Australia	21 April 1997 (age 29)	Left-handed	Left-arm medium	
19	Oliver Peake	Australia	11 September 2006 (age 20)	Left-handed	Right-arm medium	
All-rounders
12	**Will Sutherland**	Australia	27 October 1999 (age 26)	Right-handed	Right-arm fast	Captain
Wicketkeepers
Pace bowlers
5	**Jason Behrendorff**	Australia	20 April 1990 (age 36)	Right-handed	Left-arm fast	
35	**Brendan Doggett**	Australia	3 May 1994 (age 32)	Right-handed	Right-arm fast	
1	Sam Elliott	Australia	18 February 2000 (age 26)	Right-handed	Right-arm medium	
8	Tom Rogers	Australia	3 March 1994 (age 32)	Left-handed	Right-arm fast	
28	**Gurinder Sandhu**	Australia	14 June 1993 (age 33)	Left-handed	Right-arm fast	
Spin bowlers
44	Michael Archer	Australia	28 February 1997 (age 29)	Right-handed	Right-arm Leg spin	
24	Callum Stow	Australia	27 August 2002 (age 24)	Right-handed	Left-arm unorthodox	

== Fixtures ==
On 14 July 2026, Cricket Australia confirmed the full schedule for the tournament

Match 1
12 December 2026
20:10 (N)
Scorecard

Melbourne Renegades (H)	v	Perth Scorchers

M. A. Chidambaram Stadium, Chennai

Match 9
22 December 2026
19:15 (N)
Scorecard

Sydney Sixers (H)	v	Melbourne Renegades

Sydney Cricket Ground, Sydney

Match 11
24 December 2026
19:15 (N)
Scorecard

Melbourne Renegades (H)	v	Hobart Hurricanes

Junction Oval, Melbourne

Match 14
27 December 2026
19:15 (N)
Scorecard

Sydney Thunder (H)	v	Melbourne Renegades

Sydney Showground Stadium, Sydney

Match 19
1 January 2027
16:00 (D/N)
Scorecard

Melbourne Renegades (H)	v	Sydney Sixers

Melbourne Cricket Ground, Melbourne

Match 23
4 January 2027
18:05 (N)
Scorecard

Melbourne Stars (H)	v	Melbourne Renegades

Melbourne Cricket Ground, Melbourne

Match 26
6 January 2027
18:45 (N)
Scorecard

Adelaide Strikers (H)	v	Melbourne Renegades

Adelaide Oval, Adelaide

Match 31
10 January 2027
19:15 (N)
Scorecard

Melbourne Renegades (H)	v	Brisbane Heat

Junction Oval, Melbourne

Match 34
13 January 2027
16:15 (N)
Scorecard

Perth Scorchers (H)	v	Melbourne Renegades

Perth Stadium, Perth

Match 38
16 January 2027
19:15 (N)
Scorecard

Melbourne Renegades (H)	v	Melbourne Stars

Melbourne Cricket Ground, Melbourne

== Standing ==
=== Points table ===
Pos	Team	Pld	W	L	NR	Pts	NRR	Qualification
1	Adelaide Strikers	0	0	0	0	0	—	Advanced to the Qualifier
2	Brisbane Heat	0	0	0	0	0	—	Advanced to the Qualifier
3	Hobart Hurricanes	0	0	0	0	0	—	Advanced to the Knockout
4	Melbourne Renegades	0	0	0	0	0	—	Advanced to the Knockout
5	Melbourne Stars	0	0	0	0	0	—	
6	Perth Scorchers	0	0	0	0	0	—	
7	Sydney Sixers	0	0	0	0	0	—	
8	Sydney Thunder	0	0	0	0	0	—	

Source: Cricinfo

=== Match summary ===
Team	League matches										Finals		
Team	1	2	3	4	5	6	7	8	9	10	QF/KO	Ch	F
Melbourne Renegades													

Win	Loss	Tie	No result

== Administration and support staff ==
Position	Name
Head coach	Luke Ronchi
General Manager	Max Abbott
Assistant coach	Simon Helmot
Assistant coach	Ian Bell
Assistant coach	Andre Borovec
Bowling coach	Michael Lewis

- Source: Melbourne Renegades
