= Australian cricket team in Zimbabwe in 2026 =

International cricket tour

	Zimbabwe	Australia
- Dates: 15 – 20 September 2026
Captains	Sikandar Raza	Mitchell Marsh

One Day International series
- Results: Australia won the 3-match series 3–0
Most runs	Sikandar Raza (183)	Cooper Connolly (150)
Most wickets	Brad Evans (9)	Nathan Ellis (9)
- Player of the series: Cooper Connolly (Aus)

The Australian cricket team toured Zimbabwe in September 2026 to play three One Day International (ODI) matches. In April 2026, the Zimbabwe Cricket (ZC) confirmed the fixtures for the tour.

== Squads ==
Zimbabwe	Australia
Sikandar Raza (c); Brian Bennett; Ryan Burl; Graeme Cremer; Ben Curran; Craig Ervine; Brad Evans; Innocent Kaia; Wessly Madhevere; Tadiwanashe Marumani (wk); Wellington Masakadza; Ernest Masuku; Blessing Muzarabani; Newman Nyamhuri; Brendan Taylor	Mitchell Marsh (c); Xavier Bartlett; Alex Carey (wk); Cooper Connolly; Joel Davies; Nathan Ellis; Cameron Green; Josh Hazlewood; Travis Head; Josh Inglis (wk); Spencer Johnson; Oliver Peake; Matt Renshaw; Billy Stanlake; Adam Zampa

== ODI series ==
=== 1st ODI ===
15 September 2026
09:30
Scorecard

Australia; 294/8 (50 overs)	v	Zimbabwe; 235 (45.1 overs)
Matt Renshaw 109 (94); Newman Nyamhuri 5/62 (9 overs)		Craig Ervine 59 (60); Nathan Ellis 5/31 (9.1 overs)

Australia won by 59 runs
Harare Sports Club Ground, Harare
Umpires: Langton Rusere (Zim) and Alex Wharf (Eng)
Player of the match: Matt Renshaw (Aus)

- Australia won the toss and elected to bat.
- Mitchell Marsh (Aus) played in his 100th ODI.
- Matt Renshaw (Aus) scored his maiden century in ODIs.
- Newman Nyamhuri (Zim) and Nathan Ellis (Aus) both took their maiden five-wicket hauls in ODIs.

=== 2nd ODI ===
18 September 2026
09:30
Scorecard

Australia; 356/6 (50 overs)	v	Zimbabwe; 272 (48.3 overs)
Travis Head 112 (84); Brad Evans 3/86 (9 overs)		Sikandar Raza 45 (49); Cooper Connolly 2/25 (6.1 overs)

Australia won by 84 runs
Harare Sports Club Ground, Harare
Umpires: Iknow Chabi (Zim) and Rashid Riaz (Pak)
Player of the match: Travis Head (Aus)

- Zimbabwe won the toss and elected to field.
- Adam Zampa (Aus) took his 200th wicket in ODIs.

=== 3rd ODI ===
20 September 2026
09:30
Scorecard

Zimbabwe; 271/8 (50 overs)	v	Australia; 272/9 (49.5 overs)
Sikandar Raza 81* (72); Nathan Ellis 3/50 (10 overs)		Josh Inglis 103 (102); Brad Evans 4/47 (10 overs)

Australia won by 1 wicket
Harare Sports Club Ground, Harare
Umpires: Forster Mutizwa (Zim) and Alex Wharf (Eng)
Player of the match: Josh Inglis (Aus)

- Zimbabwe won the toss and elected to bat.
