= 2026–27 Adelaide Strikers season =

Australian cricket team season

Adelaide Strikers
2026–27 season
- Coach: Tim Paine
- Captain(s): Matthew Short
- Overseas player: (England) Ben Stokes (New Zealand) Mark Chapman (Pakistan) Haris Rauf
- Home ground: Adelaide Oval
- League: BBL
- BBL season: -
- BBL finals: -

The 2026–27 Adelaide Strikers season will be the sixteenth in the club's history. Coached by Tim Paine and captained by Matthew Short, the club will compete in the BBL |16.

== Background ==
The Adelaide Strikers are an Australian men's professional Twenty20 franchise cricket team that competes in the Big Bash League. The Striker wears a teal uniform and are based in Adelaide in the Australian state of Southern Australia. Their home ground is the Adelaide Oval.

Ben Stokes joined the Adelaide Strikers Mark Chapman signing for BBL |16.

== Current squad ==
- Players with international caps are listed in **bold**.

Adelaide Strikers 2026
S/N	Name	Nat.	Date of Birth	Batting Style	Bowling Style	Notes
Batters
15	Mackenzie Harvey	Australia	18 September 2000	Left-handed	Right-arm medium	
32	Mark Chapman	New Zealand	27 June 1994 (age 32)	Left-handed	Left-arm orthodox	International Signing
31	Thomas Kelly	Australia	14 December 2000	Right-handed	Right-arm medium	
23	Jason Sangha	Australia	8 September 1999	Right-handed	Right-arm leg spin	
All-rounders
6	Liam Scott	Australia	12 December 2000	Right-handed	Right-arm fast	
2	**Matt Short**	Australia	8 November 1995	Right-handed	Right-arm off spin	Captain
55	Jerrssis Wadia	Australia	22 November 2001	Left-handed	Left-arm orthodox	
Wicket-keepers
5	**Alex Carey**	Australia	27 August 1991	Left-handed	—N/a	
Bowlers
24	Lloyd Pope	Australia	1 December 1999	Right-handed	Right-arm leg spin	
58	Henry Thornton	Australia	16 December 1996	Right-handed	Right-arm fast	

== Fixtures ==
On 14 July 2026, Cricket Australia confirmed the full schedule for the tournament

Match 3
16 December 2026
19:15 (N)
Scorecard

Sydney Thunder (H)	v	Adelaide Strikers

Manuka Oval, Canberra

Match 5
18 December 2026
19:15 (N)
Scorecard

Melbourne Stars (H)	v	Adelaide Strikers

Melbourne Cricket Ground, Melbourne

Match 10
23 December 2026
18:15 (N)
Scorecard

Adelaide Strikers (H)	v	Sydney Thunder

Adelaide Oval, Adelaide

Match 15
28 December 2026
18:15 (N)
Scorecard

Brisbane Heat (H)	v	Adelaide Strikers

The Gabba, Brisbane

Match 18
31 December 2026
18:45 (N)
Scorecard

Adelaide Strikers (H)	v	Melbourne Stars

Adelaide Oval, Adelaide

Match 22
3 January 2027
19:15 (N)
Scorecard

Sydney Sixers (H)	v	Adelaide Strikers

Manuka Oval, Canberra

Match 26
6 January 2027
18:45 (N)
Scorecard

Adelaide Strikers (H)	v	Melbourne Renegades

Adelaide Oval, Adelaide

Match 29
9 January 2027
19:15 (N)
Scorecard

Hobart Hurricanes (H)	v	Adelaide Strikers

York Park, Launceston

Match 33
12 January 2027
18:45 (N)
Scorecard

Adelaide Strikers (H)	v	Hobart Hurricanes

Adelaide Oval, Adelaide

Match 37
16 January 2027
15:30 (D/N)
Scorecard

Adelaide Strikers (H)	v	Perth Scorchers

Adelaide Oval, Adelaide

== Standing ==
=== Points table ===
Pos	Team	Pld	W	L	NR	Pts	NRR	Qualification
1	Adelaide Strikers	0	0	0	0	0	—	Advanced to the Qualifier
2	Brisbane Heat	0	0	0	0	0	—	Advanced to the Qualifier
3	Hobart Hurricanes	0	0	0	0	0	—	Advanced to the Knockout
4	Melbourne Renegades	0	0	0	0	0	—	Advanced to the Knockout
5	Melbourne Stars	0	0	0	0	0	—	
6	Perth Scorchers	0	0	0	0	0	—	
7	Sydney Sixers	0	0	0	0	0	—	
8	Sydney Thunder	0	0	0	0	0	—	

Source: Cricinfo

=== Match summary ===
Team	League matches										Finals		
Team	1	2	3	4	5	6	7	8	9	10	QF/KO	Ch	F
Adelaide Strikers													

Win	Loss	Tie	No result

== Administration and support staff ==
Adelaide Strikers staff
Position	Name
Head Coach	(Australia) Tim Paine
