= 2026–27 Sydney Sixers season =

Australian cricket team season

Sydney Sixers
2026–27 season
- Coach: Matthew Mott
- Overseas player: (New Zealand) Tim Seifert
- Home ground: Sydney Cricket Ground
- League: BBL
- BBL season: -
- BBL finals: -

The 2026–27 Sydney Sixers season will be the sixteenth in the club's history. Coached by Matthew Mott and captained by TBA, the club will compete in the BBL |16.

Former captain Moises Henriques, who led the club for several seasons, retired from Australian domestic cricket ahead of the season. The Sixers are expected to appoint a new captain before the start of the campaign.

== Background ==
The Sydney Sixers entered the 2026–27 season following their elimination in the previous Big Bash League season and underwent significant changes ahead of the new campaign. In July 2026, the club appointed former Australian coach Matthew Mott as head coach, replacing Greg Shipperd after the conclusion of the previous season. Mott returned to the Sixers after previously serving as an assistant coach during the club's inaugural title-winning campaign.

The club also marked the end of an era with long-serving captain Moises Henriques announcing his retirement from Australian domestic cricket after the 2025–26 season. Henriques finished his career as the most-capped player in both Sydney Sixers and Australian domestic cricket history. At the time of the season's commencement, the Sixers had not announced a new captain.

New Zealand keeper-batter Tim Seifert has signed a one-year deal with Sydney Sixers Sydney Sixers have signed Riley Kingsell. Sydney Sixers have signed promising allrounder Jake Scott on a one-year deal for BBL |16. England allrounder Chris Jordan will make his return to the Sydney Sixers for BBL |16.Sydney Sixers signing Western Australia off-spinner Corey Rocchiccioli for BBL |16.

== Current squad ==
- Players with international caps are listed in **bold**.

Sydney Sixers 2026/27
No.	Name	Nat.	Birth date	Batting style	Bowling style	Year signed	Notes
Batters
9	Oliver Davies	Australia	14 October 2000 (age 26)	Right-handed	Right-arm off spin	2021	
26	Riley Kingsell	Australia	26 September 2005 (age 21)	Right-handed	Right-arm medium	2026	
14	Jordan Silk	Australia	13 April 1992 (age 34)	Right-handed	Right-arm leg spin	2013	
49	**Steve Smith**	Australia	2 June 1989 (age 37)	Right-handed	Right-arm leg spin	2011	
All-rounders
51	**Joel Davies**	Australia	11 September 2003 (age 23)	Left-handed	Left-arm orthodox	2023	
18	**Jack Edwards**	Australia	19 April 2000 (age 26)	Right-handed	Right-arm medium	2019	
34	**Chris Jordan**	England	4 October 1988 (age 38)	Right-handed	Right-arm fast-medium	2026	International Signing
50	Hayden Kerr	Australia	10 October 1996 (age 30)	Left-handed	Right-arm medium-fast	2020	
44	Jake Scott	Australia	10 January 2005 (age 21)	Left-handed	Right-arm fast-medium	2026	
Wicket-keepers
22	**Josh Philippe**	Australia	1 June 1997 (age 29)	Right-handed	—N/a	2018	
43	**Tim Seifert**	New Zealand	14 December 1994 (age 31)	Right-handed	—N/a	2026	International Signing
11	Lachlan Shaw	Australia	26 December 2002 (age 23)	Right-handed	—N/a	2025	
Bowlers
77	**Sean Abbott**	Australia	29 February 1992 (age 34)	Right-handed	Right-arm fast-medium	2011	
27	**Ben Dwarshuis**	Australia	23 June 1994 (age 32)	Left-handed	Right-arm fast-medium	2014	
9	Fergus O'Neill	Australia	27 January 2001 (age 25)	Right-handed	Right-arm fast-medium	2025	
77	Corey Rocchiccioli	Australia	8 October 1997 (age 29)	Right-handed	Right-arm off spin	2026	

== Fixtures ==
Prior to the release of the full schedule, Cricket Australia confirmed the first match of the season in Chennai on 10 July 2026. They later confirmed to full schedule on 14 July.

Match 2
15 December 2026
18:15 (N)
Scorecard

Brisbane Heat (H)	v	Sydney Sixers

The Gabba, Brisbane

Match 6
19 December 2026
19:15 (N)
Scorecard

Sydney Thunder (H)	v	Sydney Sixers

Sydney Showground Stadium, Sydney

Match 9
22 December 2026
19:15 (N)
Scorecard

Sydney Sixers (H)	v	Melbourne Renegades

Sydney Cricket Ground, Sydney

Match 12
26 December 2026
18:05 (N)
Scorecard

Sydney Sixers (H)	v	Brisbane Heat

Sydney Cricket Ground, Sydney

Match 19
1 January 2027
16:00 (D/N)
Scorecard

Melbourne Renegades (H)	v	Sydney Sixers

Melbourne Cricket Ground, Melbourne

Match 22
3 January 2027
19:15 (N)
Scorecard

Sydney Sixers (H)	v	Adelaide Strikers

Manuka Oval, Canberra

Match 27
7 January 2027
19:15 (N)
Scorecard

Melbourne Stars (H)	v	Sydney Sixers

Melbourne Cricket Ground, Melbourne

Match 30
10 January 2027
14:10
Scorecard

Sydney Sixers (H)	v	Perth Scorchers

Sydney Cricket Ground, Sydney

Match 36
15 January 2027
19:15 (N)
Scorecard

Sydney Sixers (H)	v	Sydney Thunder

Sydney Cricket Ground, Sydney

Match 39
17 January 2027
13:40
Scorecard

Hobart Hurricanes (H)	v	Sydney Sixers

Bellerive Oval, Hobart

== Standing ==
=== Points table ===
Pos	Team	Pld	W	L	NR	Pts	NRR	Qualification
1	Adelaide Strikers	0	0	0	0	0	—	Advanced to the Qualifier
2	Brisbane Heat	0	0	0	0	0	—	Advanced to the Qualifier
3	Hobart Hurricanes	0	0	0	0	0	—	Advanced to the Knockout
4	Melbourne Renegades	0	0	0	0	0	—	Advanced to the Knockout
5	Melbourne Stars	0	0	0	0	0	—	
6	Perth Scorchers	0	0	0	0	0	—	
7	Sydney Sixers	0	0	0	0	0	—	
8	Sydney Thunder	0	0	0	0	0	—	

Source: Cricinfo

=== Match summary ===
Team	League matches										Finals		
Team	1	2	3	4	5	6	7	8	9	10	QF/KO	Ch	F
Sydney Sixers													

Win	Loss	Tie	No result

== Administration and support staff ==
Sydney Sixers staff
Position	Name
Head coach	Matthew Mott
General manager	Rachel Haynes
