= 2026–27 Brisbane Heat season =

Australian cricket team season

Brisbane Heat
2026–27 season
- Coach: James Hopes
- Captain(s): TBA
- Home ground: Brisbane Cricket Ground
- League: BBL
- BBL season: -
- BBL finals: -

The 2026–27 Brisbane Heat season will be the sixteenth in the club's history. Coached by James Hopes and captained by TBA, the club will compete in the BBL|16.

== Background ==
The Brisbane Heat are an Australian men's professional Twenty20 franchise cricket team that competes in the Big Bash League. The Heat wear a teal uniform and are based in Brisbane in the Australian state of Queensland. Their home ground is the Brisbane Cricket Ground.

Michael Neser signed a two-year contract extension with the Brisbane Heat Tom Curran signs for Brisbane Heat Tim Robinson signing with the Brisbane Heat for BBL |16. Usman Khawaja has re-signed with the Brisbane Heat.

== Current squads ==
- Players with international caps are listed in **bold**.

Brisbane Heat 2026
| No. | Name | Nat. | Birth Date | Batting Style | Bowling Style | Additional Info. |
Batters
| 17 | Max Bryant | Australia | 10 March 1999 | Right-handed | Right-arm medium | |
| 22 | Lachlan Hearne | Australia | 19 December 2000 | Left-handed | Right-arm off spin | |
| 38 | **Nathan McSweeney** | Australia | 8 March 1999 | Right-handed | Right-arm off spin | |
| 77 | **Matt Renshaw** | Australia | 28 March 1996 | Left-handed | Right-arm off spin | |
| 7 | **Tim Robinson** | New Zealand | 28 April 2002 (age 24) | Right-handed | Right-arm medium | International Signing |
All-rounders
| 59 | **Tom Curran** | England | 12 March 1995 (age 31) | Right-handed | Right-arm fast-medium | International Signing |
| 20 | **Michael Neser** | Australia | 29 March 1990 | Right-handed | Right-arm medium | |
| 23 | Hugh Weibgen | Australia | 28 October 2004 | Right-handed | Right-arm off spin | |
| 24 | **Jack Wildermuth** | Australia | 1 September 1993 | Right-handed | Right-arm medium | |
Wicket-keepers
| 59 | Jimmy Peirson | Australia | 13 October 1992 | Right-handed | —N/a | |
Bowlers
| 19 | **Xavier Bartlett** | Australia | 17 December 1998 | Right-handed | Right-arm fast | |
| 45 | **Spencer Johnson** | Australia | 16 December 1995 | Left-handed | Left-arm fast | |
| 30 | **Matt Kuhnemann** | Australia | 20 September 1996 | Left-handed | Slow left-arm orthodox | |
| 15 | Callum Vidler | Australia | 14 October 2005 | Right-handed | Right-arm medium | |

== Fixtures ==
On 14 July 2026, Cricket Australia confirmed the full schedule for the tournament

Match 2
15 December 2026
18:15 (N)
Scorecard

| Brisbane Heat (H) | v | Sydney Sixers |

The Gabba, Brisbane

Match 4
17 December 2026
19:15 (N)
Scorecard

| Hobart Hurricanes (H) | v | Brisbane Heat |

Bellerive Oval, Hobart

Match 8
21 December 2026
19:15 (N)
Scorecard

| Melbourne Stars (H) | v | Brisbane Heat |

Junction Oval, Melbourne

Match 12
26 December 2026
18:05 (N)
Scorecard

| Sydney Sixers (H) | v | Brisbane Heat |

Sydney Cricket Ground, Sydney

Match 15
28 December 2026
18:15 (N)
Scorecard

| Brisbane Heat (H) | v | Adelaide Strikers |

The Gabba, Brisbane

Match 20
1 January 2027
18:15 (N)
Scorecard

| Brisbane Heat (H) | v | Hobart Hurricanes |

The Gabba, Brisbane

Match 24
4 January 2027
18:15 (N)
Scorecard

| Perth Scorchers (H) | v | Brisbane Heat |

Perth Stadium, Perth

Match 28
8 January 2027
18:15 (N)
Scorecard

| Brisbane Heat (H) | v | Perth Scorchers |

The Gabba, Brisbane

Match 31
10 January 2027
19:15 (N)
Scorecard

| Melbourne Renegades (H) | v | Brisbane Heat |

Junction Oval, Melbourne

Match 40
17 January 2027
18:15 (N)
Scorecard

| Brisbane Heat (H) | v | Sydney Thunder |

The Gabba, Brisbane

== Standing ==
=== Points table ===
| Pos | Team | Pld | W | L | NR | Pts | NRR | Qualification |
|---|---|---|---|---|---|---|---|---|
| 1 | Adelaide Strikers | 0 | 0 | 0 | 0 | 0 | — | Advanced to the Qualifier |
| 2 | Brisbane Heat | 0 | 0 | 0 | 0 | 0 | — | Advanced to the Qualifier |
| 3 | Hobart Hurricanes | 0 | 0 | 0 | 0 | 0 | — | Advanced to the Knockout |
| 4 | Melbourne Renegades | 0 | 0 | 0 | 0 | 0 | — | Advanced to the Knockout |
| 5 | Melbourne Stars | 0 | 0 | 0 | 0 | 0 | — | |
| 6 | Perth Scorchers | 0 | 0 | 0 | 0 | 0 | — | |
| 7 | Sydney Sixers | 0 | 0 | 0 | 0 | 0 | — | |
| 8 | Sydney Thunder | 0 | 0 | 0 | 0 | 0 | — | |

Source: Cricinfo

=== Match summary ===
| Team | League matches | | | | | | | | | | Finals | | |
| Team | 1 | 2 | 3 | 4 | 5 | 6 | 7 | 8 | 9 | 10 | QF/KO | Ch | F |
|---|---|---|---|---|---|---|---|---|---|---|---|---|---|
| Brisbane Heat | | | | | | | | | | | | | |

| Win | Loss | Tie | No result |

== Administration and support staff ==
| Position | Name |
|---|---|
| Head Coach | (Australia) James Hopes |
