= Bryce Street =

Australian cricketer

Personal information
- Full name: Bryce Edward Street
- Born: 25 January 1998 (age 28); Gosford, New South Wales, Australia
- Batting: Left-handed
- Bowling: Right-arm medium
- Role: Batsman

Domestic team information
- Years: Team
- 2016/17–2024/25: Queensland (squad no. 25)

Career statistics
Competition	FC	LA
Matches	42	4
Runs scored	2,127	93
Batting average	32.41	23.25
100s/50s	6/7	0/0
Top score	143	33
Balls bowled	219	24
Wickets	2	0
Bowling average	96.50	–
5 wickets in innings	0	–
10 wickets in match	0	–
Best bowling	1/19	–
Catches/stumpings	38/–	1/–
- Source: Cricinfo, 11 September 2025

Bryce Edward Street (born 25 January 1998) is an Australian cricketer.

In April 2016, he was awarded a rookie contract with Queensland ahead of the 2016–17 season. He made his first-class debut on 18 October 2019, for Queensland in the 2019–20 Sheffield Shield season. Two weeks before his first-class debut, Street made the highest individual total in Second XI cricket in Australia, scoring 345 runs against Victoria. He made his List A debut on 31 October 2019, for Queensland in the 2019–20 Marsh One-Day Cup. On 4 November 2019, Street scored his maiden first-class century, with 115 runs against Western Australia.

Street was upgraded to a full contract with Queensland ahead of the 2020–21 season.

In December 2021, Street represented Australia A against the England Lions, scoring an unbeaten 119 in the second innings of the first-class match between the two sides at Ian Healy Oval.

== See also ==
- List of Queensland first-class cricketers
