= 2026–27 Perth Scorchers season =

Perth Scorchers season

Perth Scorchers
2026–27 season
- Coach: (Australia) Adam Voges
- Captain(s): (Australia) Ashton Turner
- Overseas player: (England) Zak Crawley (England) Calvin Harrison (Wales) Aneurin Donald
- Home ground: Perth Stadium
- League: Big Bash League
- BBL season: -
- BBL finals: -

The 2026–27 Perth Scorchers season will be the sixteenth in the club's history. Coached by Adam Voges and captained by Ashton Turner, the club will compete in the BBL |16.

== Background ==
The Perth Scorchers are an Australian men's professional Twenty20 franchise cricket team that competes in the Big Bash League. The Scorchers wear an orange uniform and are based in Perth in the Australian state of Western Australia. Their home ground is Perth Stadium.

Following their record-extending sixth Big Bash League title in the BBL|15, the Perth Scorchers entered the 2026–27 season as the defending champions. During the off-season, the club appointed Kade Harvey as its new General Manager, replacing Christina Matthews, while Adam Voges continued as head coach and Ashton Turner remained captain.

On 10 July 2026, Cricket Australia confirmed that the Scorchers would face the Melbourne Renegades in the opening match of the 2026–27 Big Bash League season at the M. A. Chidambaram Stadium in Chennai, India. The fixture marked the first Big Bash League match to be played outside Australia. Prior to the match, the Scorchers travelled to Chennai for a training camp to acclimatise to local conditions and prepare for the historic season opener.

Previous star import Finn Allen chose to join Melbourne Stars for BBL 16. Perth's first international signing was Calvin Harrison, followed by the returning Zak Crawley and finally Welsh-born England cricketer Aneurin Donald, in his first stint with an international franchise team.

== Current squad ==
- Players with international caps are listed in **bold**.

Perth Scorchers 2026–27
Name	Nat.	Date of Birth	Batting Style	Bowling Style	Year signed	Notes
Batters
**Ashton Turner**	Australia	January 25, 1993 (age 33)	Right-handed	Right-arm off break	2012	Captain
**Cooper Connolly**	Australia	August 22, 2003 (age 23)	Left-handed	Slow left-arm orthodox	2022	
**Zak Crawley**	England	February 3, 1998 (age 28)	Right-handed			
All-rounders
**Aaron Hardie**	Australia	January 7, 1999 (age 27)	Right-handed	Right-arm medium-fast	2019	
**Mitchell Marsh**	Australia	October 20, 1991 (age 35)	Right-handed	Right-arm medium-fast	2011	
Wicket-keepers
Joel Curtis	Australia	November 4, 1999 (age 26)	Left-handed		2025	
Bowlers
**Jhye Richardson**	Australia	September 20, 1996 (age 30)	Right-handed	Right-arm fast	2016	
**Joel Paris**	Australia	December 11, 1992 (age 33)	Left-handed	Left-arm fast-medium		
**Lance Morris**	Australia	March 28, 1998 (age 28)	Right-handed	Right-arm fast	2021	
**Ashton Agar**	Australia	October 14, 1993 (age 33)	Left-handed	Left-arm orthodox		
**Mahli Beardman**	Australia	August 31, 2005 (age 21)	Right-handed	Right-arm fast		

== Fixtures ==
Prior to the release of the full schedule, Cricket Australia confirmed the first match of the season in Chennai on 10 July 2026. They later confirmed to full schedule on 14 July.

Match 1
12 December 2026
20:10 (N)
Scorecard

Melbourne Renegades (H)	v	Perth Scorchers

M. A. Chidambaram Stadium, Chennai

Match 7
20 December 2026
16:15 (N)
Scorecard

Perth Scorchers (H)	v	Hobart Hurricanes

Perth Stadium, Perth

Match 13
26 December 2026
18:15 (N)
Scorecard

Perth Scorchers (H)	v	Melbourne Stars

Perth Stadium, Perth

Match 17
30 December 2026
16:15
Scorecard

Perth Scorchers (H)	v	Sydney Thunder

Perth Stadium, Perth

Match 21
2 January 2027
19:15 (N)
Scorecard

Sydney Thunder (H)	v	Perth Scorchers

Sydney Showground Stadium, Sydney

Match 24
4 January 2027
18:15 (N)
Scorecard

Perth Scorchers (H)	v	Brisbane Heat

Perth Stadium, Perth

Match 28
8 January 2027
18:15 (N)
Scorecard

Brisbane Heat (H)	v	Perth Scorchers

The Gabba, Brisbane

Match 30
10 January 2027
14:10
Scorecard

Sydney Sixers (H)	v	Perth Scorchers

Sydney Cricket Ground, Sydney

Match 34
13 January 2027
16:15 (N)
Scorecard

Perth Scorchers (H)	v	Melbourne Renegades

Perth Stadium, Perth

Match 37
16 January 2027
15:30 (D/N)
Scorecard

Adelaide Strikers (H)	v	Perth Scorchers

Adelaide Oval, Adelaide

== Standing ==
=== Points table ===
Pos	Team	Pld	W	L	NR	Pts	NRR	Qualification
1	Adelaide Strikers	0	0	0	0	0	—	Advanced to the Qualifier
2	Brisbane Heat	0	0	0	0	0	—	Advanced to the Qualifier
3	Hobart Hurricanes	0	0	0	0	0	—	Advanced to the Knockout
4	Melbourne Renegades	0	0	0	0	0	—	Advanced to the Knockout
5	Melbourne Stars	0	0	0	0	0	—	
6	Perth Scorchers	0	0	0	0	0	—	
7	Sydney Sixers	0	0	0	0	0	—	
8	Sydney Thunder	0	0	0	0	0	—	

Source: Cricinfo

=== Match summary ===
Team	League matches										Finals		
Team	1	2	3	4	5	6	7	8	9	10	QF/KO	Ch	F
Perth Scorchers													

Win	Loss	Tie	No result

== Administration and support staff ==
Perth Scorchers staff
Position	Name
Head Coach	Adam Voges
List Management & Strategy	Simon Katich
Assistant Coach	Tim Macdonald
Assistant Coach	Beau Casson
Development Coach	Travis Birt
Development Coach	Michael Marshall
Performance Analyst	Joshua Sale
SSSM Manager	Toby Horak
Head Physiotherapist	Angus Le Lievre
Physiotherapist	Chris Quinnell
Physical Performance Coach	Warren Andrews
Head Medical Officer	Jonathon Charlesworth
Dietitian	Beth Allanson
Sports Psychologist	Jack Hudson-Williams
Player Development Manager	Scott Hancock
High Performance Coordinator	Melissa Heron

== See also ==
- 2026 Global Super League
