= 2026–27 Sydney Thunder season =

Australian cricket team season

Sydney Thunder
2026–27 season
- Coach: (Australia) Andrew Flintoff
- Captain(s): (Australia) David Warner
- Overseas player: (England) Sam Billings
- Home ground: Sydney Showground Stadium
- League: Big Bash League
- BBL season: -
- BBL finals: -

The 2026–27 Sydney Thunder season will be the sixteenth in the club's history. Coached by Andrew Flintoff and captained by David Warner, the club will compete in the BBL |16.

== Background ==
The Sydney Thunder are an Australian men's professional Twenty20 franchise cricket team that competes in the Big Bash League. The Thunder wear an electric green uniform and are based in Sydney in the Australian state of New South Wales. Their home ground is the Sydney Showground Stadium.

== Current squads ==
- Players with international caps are listed in **bold**.

Sydney Thunder 2026–27
No.	Name	Nat.	Birth Date	Batting Style	Bowling Style	Additional Info.
Batters
1	**Cameron Bancroft**	(Australia)	19 November 1992	Right-handed	Right-arm fast	
5	**Sam Konstas**	(Australia)	2 October 2005	Right-handed	Right-arm leg spin	
31	**David Warner**	(Australia)	27 October 1986	Left-handed	Right-arm medium	Captain
All-rounders
93	**Chris Green**	(Australia)	1 October 1993	Right-handed	Right-arm off spin	
44	Nathan McAndrew	(Australia)	14 July 1993	Right-handed	Right-arm fast	
95	**Daniel Sams**	(Australia)	27 October 1992	Right-handed	Left-arm fast	
Wicket-keepers
77	**Sam Billings**	(England)	15 June 1991	Right-handed	—N/a	Overseas Direct singing
22	Matthew Gilkes	(Australia)	21 August 1999	Left-handed	—N/a	
Bowlers
34	Ryan Hadley	(Australia)	17 November 1998	Right-handed	Right-arm fast	
17	**Tanveer Sangha**	(Australia)	26 November 2001	Right-handed	Right-arm leg spin	

== Fixtures ==
On 14 July 2026, Cricket Australia confirmed the full schedule for the tournament

Match 3
16 December 2026
19:15 (N)
Scorecard

Sydney Thunder (H)	v	Adelaide Strikers

Manuka Oval, Canberra

Match 6
19 December 2026
19:15 (N)
Scorecard

Sydney Thunder (H)	v	Sydney Sixers

Sydney Showground Stadium, Sydney

Match 10
23 December 2026
18:15 (N)
Scorecard

Adelaide Strikers (H)	v	Sydney Thunder

Adelaide Oval, Adelaide

Match 14
27 December 2026
19:15 (N)
Scorecard

Sydney Thunder (H)	v	Melbourne Renegades

Sydney Showground Stadium, Sydney

Match 17
30 December 2026
16:15
Scorecard

Perth Scorchers (H)	v	Sydney Thunder

Perth Stadium, Perth

Match 21
2 January 2027
19:15 (N)
Scorecard

Sydney Thunder (H)	v	Perth Scorchers

Sydney Showground Stadium, Sydney

Match 25
5 January 2027
19:15 (N)
Scorecard

Hobart Hurricanes (H)	v	Sydney Thunder

Bellerive Oval, Hobart

Match 32
11 January 2027
19:15 (N)
Scorecard

Sydney Thunder (H)	v	Melbourne Stars

Manuka Oval, Canberra

Match 36
15 January 2027
19:15 (N)
Scorecard

Sydney Sixers (H)	v	Sydney Thunder

Sydney Cricket Ground, Sydney

Match 40
17 January 2027
18:15 (N)
Scorecard

Brisbane Heat (H)	v	Sydney Thunder

The Gabba, Brisbane

== Standing ==
=== Points table ===
Pos	Team	Pld	W	L	NR	Pts	NRR	Qualification
1	Adelaide Strikers	0	0	0	0	0	—	Advanced to the Qualifier
2	Brisbane Heat	0	0	0	0	0	—	Advanced to the Qualifier
3	Hobart Hurricanes	0	0	0	0	0	—	Advanced to the Knockout
4	Melbourne Renegades	0	0	0	0	0	—	Advanced to the Knockout
5	Melbourne Stars	0	0	0	0	0	—	
6	Perth Scorchers	0	0	0	0	0	—	
7	Sydney Sixers	0	0	0	0	0	—	
8	Sydney Thunder	0	0	0	0	0	—	

Source: Cricinfo

=== Match summary ===
Team	League matches										Finals		
Team	1	2	3	4	5	6	7	8	9	10	QF/KO	Ch	F
Sydney Thunder													

Win	Loss	Tie	No result

== Administration and support staff ==
Position	Name
Head Coach	(Australia) Andrew Flintoff
