= 2026–27 Melbourne Stars season =

Melbourne Stars in 2026–27

Melbourne Stars
2026–27 season
- Coach: (Australia) Cameron White
- Captain(s): (Australia) Marcus Stoinis
- Overseas player: Finn Allen Jamie Overton Craig Overton
- Home ground: Melbourne Cricket Ground
- League: Big Bash League
- BBL season: -
- BBL finals: -

The 2026–27 Melbourne Stars season will be the sixteenth in the club's history. Coached by Cameron White and captained by Marcus Stoinis, the club will compete in the BBL |16.

== Background ==
The Melbourne Stars are an Australian men's professional Twenty20 franchise cricket team that competes in the Big Bash League. The Stars wear a green uniform and are based in Melbourne in the Australian state of Victoria. Their home ground is the Melbourne Cricket Ground.

New Zealand Finn Allen has been lured out of Perth Scorchers and is heading to the Melbourne Stars Melbourne Stars signing England twins, Craig Overton and Jamie Overton.

== Current squads ==
- Players with international caps are listed in **bold**.

Melbourne Stars 2026–27
No.	Name	Nat.	Birth Date	Batting Style	Bowling Style	Additional Info.
Batters
32	**Finn Allen**	(New Zealand)	22 April 1999	Right-handed	Right-arm off spin	Direct signings
35	**Hilton Cartwright**	(Australia)	14 February 1992	Right-handed	Right-arm medium	
37	Campbell Kellaway	(Australia)	1 November 2002	Left-handed	Left-arm orthodox	
3	Tom Rogers	(Australia)	7 February 1999	Left-handed	Right-arm leg spin	
All-rounders
32	**Glenn Maxwell**	(Australia)	14 October 1988	Right-handed	Right-arm off spin	
16	**Marcus Stoinis**	(Australia)	16 August 1989	Right-handed	Right-arm fast	Captain
88	**Jamie Overton**	(England)	10 April 1994	Right-handed	Right-arm fast	Direct signings
7	**Craig Overton**	(England)	10 April 1994	Right-handed	Right-arm medium	Direct signings
Wicket-keepers
6	Sam Harper	(Australia)	10 December 1996	Right-handed	Right-arm off spin	
Pace bowlers
-	Austin Anlezark	(Australia)	16 June 2005	Left-handed	Right-arm medium	
7	Liam Hatcher	(Australia)	17 September 1996	Right-handed	Right-arm fast	
64	**Peter Siddle**	(Australia)	25 November 1984	Right-handed	Right-arm fast	
61	Mark Steketee	(Australia)	17 January 1994	Right-handed	Right-arm fast	
4	**Mitch Swepson**	(Australia)	4 October 1993	Right-handed	Right-arm leg spin	

== Fixtures ==
On 14 July 2026, Cricket Australia confirmed the full schedule for the tournament

Match 3
16 December 2026
19:15 (N)
Scorecard

Sydney Thunder (H)	v	Adelaide Strikers

Manuka Oval, Canberra

Match 6
19 December 2026
19:15 (N)
Scorecard

Sydney Thunder (H)	v	Sydney Sixers

Sydney Showground Stadium, Sydney

Match 10
23 December 2026
18:15 (N)
Scorecard

Adelaide Strikers (H)	v	Sydney Thunder

Adelaide Oval, Adelaide

Match 14
27 December 2026
19:15 (N)
Scorecard

Sydney Thunder (H)	v	Melbourne Renegades

Sydney Showground Stadium, Sydney

Match 17
30 December 2026
16:15
Scorecard

Perth Scorchers (H)	v	Sydney Thunder

Perth Stadium, Perth

Match 21
2 January 2027
19:15 (N)
Scorecard

Sydney Thunder (H)	v	Perth Scorchers

Sydney Showground Stadium, Sydney

Match 25
5 January 2027
19:15 (N)
Scorecard

Hobart Hurricanes (H)	v	Sydney Thunder

Bellerive Oval, Hobart

Match 32
11 January 2027
19:15 (N)
Scorecard

Sydney Thunder (H)	v	Melbourne Stars

Manuka Oval, Canberra

Match 36
15 January 2027
19:15 (N)
Scorecard

Sydney Sixers (H)	v	Sydney Thunder

Sydney Cricket Ground, Sydney

Match 40
17 January 2027
18:15 (N)
Scorecard

Brisbane Heat (H)	v	Sydney Thunder

The Gabba, Brisbane

== Standing ==
=== Points table ===
Pos	Team	Pld	W	L	NR	Pts	NRR	Qualification
1	Adelaide Strikers	0	0	0	0	0	—	Advanced to the Qualifier
2	Brisbane Heat	0	0	0	0	0	—	Advanced to the Qualifier
3	Hobart Hurricanes	0	0	0	0	0	—	Advanced to the Knockout
4	Melbourne Renegades	0	0	0	0	0	—	Advanced to the Knockout
5	Melbourne Stars	0	0	0	0	0	—	
6	Perth Scorchers	0	0	0	0	0	—	
7	Sydney Sixers	0	0	0	0	0	—	
8	Sydney Thunder	0	0	0	0	0	—	

Source: Cricinfo

=== Match summary ===
Team	League matches										Finals		
Team	1	2	3	4	5	6	7	8	9	10	QF/KO	Ch	F
Melbourne Stars													

Win	Loss	Tie	No result

== Administration and support staff ==
Position	Name	ref
Head Coach	(Australia) Cameron White	
General Manager	James Rosengarten	
