= Shawn Bradstreet =

Australian cricketer (born 1972)

Personal information
- Born: 28 February 1972 (age 53); Wollongong, Australia
- Source: ESPNcricinfo, 23 December 2016

Shawn Bradstreet (born 28 February 1972) is an Australian cricketer. He played nine first-class and fifty List A matches for New South Wales between 1998/99 and 2004/05.

== See also ==
- List of New South Wales representative cricketers
