= Harare Sports Club =

Cricket stadium

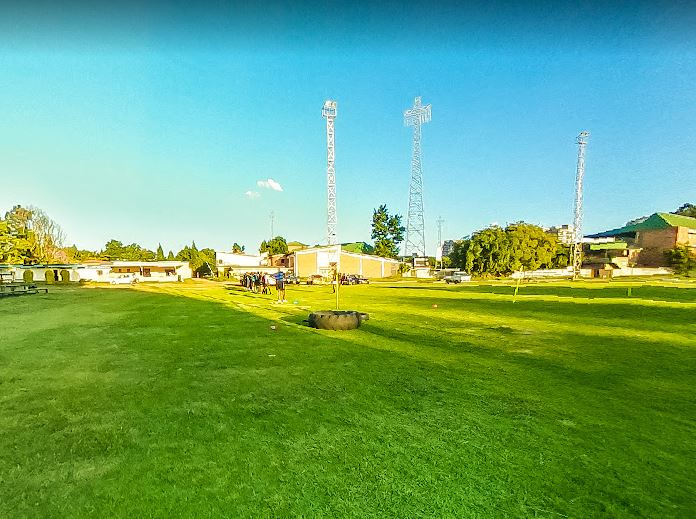
- Harare Sports Club
- Interactive map of Harare Sports Club

Ground information
- Location: Harare, Zimbabwe
- Country: Zimbabwe
- Coordinates: 17°48′51″S 31°3′2″E
- Establishment: 1900
- Capacity: 10,000
- Owner: Zimbabwe Cricket
- Operator: Zimbabwe Cricket
- Tenants: Zimbabwe national cricket team Rhodesia cricket team Mashonaland cricket team Mashonaland Eagles
- End names
- Prayag End; Cycle Pure End

International information
- First men's Test: 18–22 October 1992: Zimbabwe v India
- Last men's Test: 20–22 October 2025: Zimbabwe v Afghanistan
- First men's ODI: 25 October 1992: Zimbabwe v India
- Last men's ODI: 20 September 2026: Zimbabwe v Australia
- First men's T20I: 12 June 2010: Zimbabwe v India
- Last men's T20I: 31 October 2025: Zimbabwe v Afghanistan
- First women's ODI: 5 October 2021: Zimbabwe v Ireland
- Last women's ODI: 28 October 2024: Zimbabwe v United States
- First women's T20I: 12 May 2019: Zimbabwe v Namibia
- Last women's T20I: 2 April 2024: Zimbabwe v Papua New Guinea

Team information
Rhodesia	(1910–1979)
Mashonaland	(1923–2008)
Mashonaland Eagles	(2009–present)
- As of 21 December 2024; Source: Cricinfo

Harare Sports Club is a sports club and the Harare Sports Club Ground is a cricket stadium in Harare, Zimbabwe. Founded in 1900 and known as Salisbury Sports Club until 1982, it is mostly used for cricket matches, and has served as the primary cricket venue in Rhodesia and Zimbabwe since its foundation. Other sports played at the club are rugby, tennis, golf and squash.

== History ==
The earliest recorded first-class cricket match at Salisbury Sports Club was played in 1910. In the years between World War II and independence from the United Kingdom in 1980, the ground hosted several of Rhodesia's home matches in the Currie Cup, South Africa's main domestic first-class competition.

The first List A match at the ground was played in September 1980, shortly after independence. During the 1980s and early 1990s, the ground frequently hosted first-class and List A matches between the Zimbabwe national team and touring national 'A', 'B' and youth teams.

In July 1992, Zimbabwe became a full member of the International Cricket Council (ICC), thus obtaining Test status. Three months later, Harare Sports Club hosted the country's inaugural Test match, against India. Soon after, the ground played host to its first One Day International, also against India. In February 1995, HSC was the site of Zimbabwe's first-ever Test win, against Pakistan.

== The venue ==
The ground is surrounded by Jacaranda trees and with a gabled pavilion, Harare Sports Club is in the heart of the city. It is bordered by the presidential palace on one side and the Royal Harare Golf Club on another.

The venue hosted Zimbabwe's first Test in October 1992 and has been the country's major Test and one-day venue since. Although the club itself does not possess any of the major stands associated with major sports grounds, the capacity of around 10,000 can be increased by the use of temporary stands, like when a record crowd of 26,000 saw Rhodesia play the MCC in 1956.

However, that capacity is rarely tested and in recent times only the 2014 Zimbabwe Tri-Series, involving Australia and South Africa, and the 2018 Cricket World Cup Qualifier have drawn sizeable crowds. The main social centre is the historic pavilion with its popular bar, The Centurion. On the southern side of the ground is Castle Corner, the alternative and usually lively bar.

This ground is home to the domestic team Mashonaland Eagles. Harare Sports Club is also home to the Zimbabwe Cricket Union, the country's national cricket board.

Floodlight towers were installed at the ground in 2023 for the launch of the Zim Afro T10.

On 7 December 2023, the 1st T20I between Zimbabwe and Ireland was played under the floodlights, the first ever international match to be played under the lights at this venue.

In September 2026, the ground was the selected venue for hosting the first bilateral series between Australia and Zimbabwe featuring three-match ODIs.

== See also ==
- List of Test cricket grounds
