= Daniel Solway =

Australian cricketer (born 1995)

Personal information
- Full name: Daniel Luke Solway
- Born: 18 April 1995 (age 31)
- Batting: Right-handed
- Role: Wicket-keeper

Domestic team information
- Years: Team
- 2019/20–: New South Wales

Career statistics
| Competition | FC |
|---|---|
| Matches | 13 |
| Runs scored | 714 |
| Batting average | 39.66 |
| 100s/50s | 1/5 |
| Top score | 133* |
| Catches/stumpings | 6/– |
- Source: Cricinfo, 4 October 2021

Daniel Solway (born 18 April 1995) is an Australian cricketer who plays for New South Wales.

Solway played Sydney, Australia grade cricket for Bankstown scoring prolifically enough to train with NSW. He made his first class debut on 1 November 2019 in the Sheffield Shield clash at Adelaide Oval against South Australia scoring a century.
