= Mike Archer (cricketer) =

Australian cricketer (born 1997)

Michael Archer
Personal information
- Full name: Michael William Archer
- Born: 28 February 1997 (age 29); Tatura, Victoria, Australia
- Bowling: Right-arm leg break
- Role: Bowler

Domestic team information
- Years: Team
- 2025–2026: Melbourne Renegades
- Source: , 4 September 2026

Michael William Archer (born 28 February 1997) is an Australian cricketer who plays as a right-arm leg-spin bowler. He represents the Melbourne Renegades in the Big Bash League (BBL).

== Early life and club cricket ==
Archer was born in Tatura, Victoria, Australia. He developed his cricket through regional Victorian cricket before progressing to Victorian Premier Cricket. He played First XI cricket for Greenvale Kangaroos before joining Carlton Cricket Club at the beginning of the 2023–24 season.

During the 2023–24 Victorian Premier Cricket season, Archer was part of Carlton's premiership-winning First XI. In the grand final against Casey South Melbourne, he took two wickets in consecutive deliveries during Carlton's comeback victory. He finished the season with 37 wickets at an average of 16.

Archer also played club cricket in England, representing Farnsfield Cricket Club in the Nottingham Premier Cricket League during the 2024 season.

=== Big Bash League ===
Archer made his Big Bash League debut for the Melbourne Renegades during the 2025–26 season. He was selected as a replacement for Adam Zampa, who was unavailable because of the 2026 T20 World Cup. Archer made his debut against the Adelaide Strikers, bowling two overs for 15 runs without taking a wicket.

In August 2026, the Melbourne Renegades signed Archer to their primary list for the 2026–27 Big Bash League season (BBL|16) on a one-year contract.

=== Top End T20 Series ===
In the 2026 Top End T20 Series, Archer represented the Victoria Academy. Against Northern Territory Strike, he took a hat-trick and finished with bowling figures of 4/13 as Victoria Academy won by 52 runs.

The hat-trick was Archer's second in approximately 18 months, following another hat-trick for the Melbourne Renegades Academy in April 2025.
