= Jerrssis Wadia =

Australian cricketer (born 2001)

Personal information
- Full name: Jerrssis Dillzan Wadia
- Born: 12 November 2001 (age 25); Mumbai, India
- Batting: Left-handed
- Bowling: Slow left-arm orthodox
- Role: All-rounder

Domestic team information
- Years: Team
- 2025/26–present: Adelaide Strikers (squad no. 55)
- 2026/27–present: South Australia

Career statistics
Competition	List A	T20
Matches	3	7
Runs scored	29	52
Batting average	14.50	8.66
100s/50s	0/0	0/0
Top score	19	34
Balls bowled	144	72
Wickets	4	2
Bowling average	28.00	45.50
5 wickets in innings	0	0
10 wickets in match	0	0
Best bowling	3/37	2/11
Catches/stumpings	0/–	5/–
- Source: Cricinfo, 18 October 2026

Jerrssis Dillzan Wadia (born 22 November 2001) is an Indian-born cricketer based in Australia who plays for South Australia and the Adelaide Strikers. He is a left-handed batsman and left-arm orthodox spin bowler. He made his Big Bash League debut against Melbourne Stars on 23 December 2025.

== Early and personal life ==
Wadia was born in Mumbai, India. Wadia’s father, Dilzan Wadia, is a Bollywood actor based in Mumbai. Fellow Indian cricketer Hardik Pandya would take tuition from Wadia's mother, and stayed at his family house in Mumbai. His grandfather Neville Wadia became the oldest player to score a century in minor cricket, earning a place in the Guinness Book of World Records. He speaks Hindi and Gujarati, as well as English. Wadia played U16 and U19 cricket for the Baroda Cricket Association, before moving to Adelaide.

== Career ==
Wadia first came to Australia at the age of 17 years-old, and played for the South Australia U19s and with the Adelaide Strikers Academy, only to return to Mumbai as the COVID-19 pandemic stopped cricket and international borders closed. Having moved back to Adelaide in 2022, Wadia played South Australian Premier Cricket from the 2022–23 campaign onwards, and featured for clubs such as East Torrens and Tea Tree Gully.

Wadia was playing at a T10 tournament in Melbourne, when he was spotted by former Australia captain and current Adelaide Strikers coach Tim Paine. Wadia was brought into the Adelaide Strikers squad for the Big Bash League in 2025; as a local player replacement for Alex Carey. He made his debut against Melbourne Stars on 23 December 2025. In his second appearance on 27 December, he hit three sixes from the first three balls he faced from Jack Wildermuth, scoring 22 from his first four balls, and ultimately scoring 34 from 16 deliveries against Brisbane Heat.
