= Nikhil Chaudhary (cricketer) =

Australian cricketer (born 1996)

Personal information
- Born: 4 May 1996 (age 30); Delhi, India
- Batting: Right-handed
- Bowling: Right-arm off break
- Role: Batting all-rounder

International information
- National side: Australia (2026–present)
- T20I debut (cap 117): 17 June 2026 v Bangladesh
- Last T20I: 21 November 2026 v England

Domestic team information
- Years: Team
- 2016/17–2019/20: Punjab
- 2023/24–present: Hobart Hurricanes
- 2025/26–present: Tasmania
- 2026–present: JB Bruges
- 2026–present: Washington Freedom
- 2026: Southern Brave
- 2026: St Kitts and Nevis Patriots

Career statistics
Competition	T20I	FC	LA	T20
Matches	4	9	16	71
Runs scored	92	567	278	1,225
Batting average	30.66	35.43	25.27	23.55
100s/50s	0/1	1/3	0/1	0/3
Top score	66	163	67	79
Balls bowled	66	420	477	786
Wickets	4	5	11	34
Bowling average	17.25	57.40	41.00	29.85
5 wickets in innings	0	1	0	0
10 wickets in match	0	0	0	0
Best bowling	2/21	5/108	3/66	3/36
Catches/stumpings	3/–	5/–	8/–	25/–
- Source: ESPNcricinfo, 21 November 2026

Nikhil Chaudhary (born 4 May 1996) is an India-born Australian cricketer who plays for Tasmania, Hobart Hurricanes and the Washington Freedom. In June 2026, he earned his maiden call-up to the Australia national cricket team and made his international debut during the T20I series in Bangladesh. He is also the second India-born cricketer to feature in the Big Bash League.

== Early life ==
Chaudhary was born in Delhi, India. Chaudhary moved to Punjab in his early years. Initially aspiring to be a fast bowler, he later shifted to offspin and ultimately to legspin, while also developing as an aggressive batsman.

== Domestic career ==
By 2017, Chaudhary had emerged in Indian domestic cricket as a batting all-rounder. He made his Twenty20 debut for Punjab in the 2016–17 Inter State Twenty-20 Tournament on 29 January 2017. Despite training under cricketers such as Harbhajan Singh and Yuvraj Singh in Punjab, his career in India did not lead to an IPL selection, with unsuccessful trials at Mumbai Indians.

His career took a turn when he was stranded in Brisbane during the COVID-19 pandemic while he was on a travel visa. During this period, he actively participated in club cricket, gaining notice for his performance, especially in a semi-final where he hit seven sixes. The performance led to his inclusion in the BBL after a recommendation from a local coach. During this period, he also worked various jobs in Brisbane, including a brief period at a Mexican restaurant and a longer tenure as a courier with Australia Post to support himself.

In 2023, after playing grade cricket in Brisbane, Chaudhary joined the Hobart Hurricanes of the Big Bash League for the 2023–24 season.

In January 2025, Chaudhary was part of the Hurricanes squad that won the 2024–25 Big Bash League final.

== International career ==
On 11 June 2026, Chaudhary received his maiden international call-up when he was added to Australia's T20I squad for their three-match tour of Bangladesh, replacing Travis Head, who withdrew due to personal leave.

On November 21 2026, Chaudhary earned player of the match honours in Australia's three-wicket victory over England in the T20 international match at the Melbourne Cricket Ground. Chaudhary scored 66 runs off 38 balls, and picked up two wickets.

Although he does not hold Australian citizenship, he is a permanent resident who meets the ICC's eligibility criteria through residency. Chaudhary made his debut in the first match of the series, making him the first India-born male cricketer to represent Australia internationally in over 60 years, since leg-spinner Rex Sellers in 1964.

== Legal issues ==
In March 2024, Chaudhary stood trial in the District Court of Queensland on a charge of raping a woman in his car in Townsville in 2021, and was found not guilty. The Hobart Hurricanes said they were unaware of the charges before the trial started.
