= Matthew Mott =

Australian cricketer

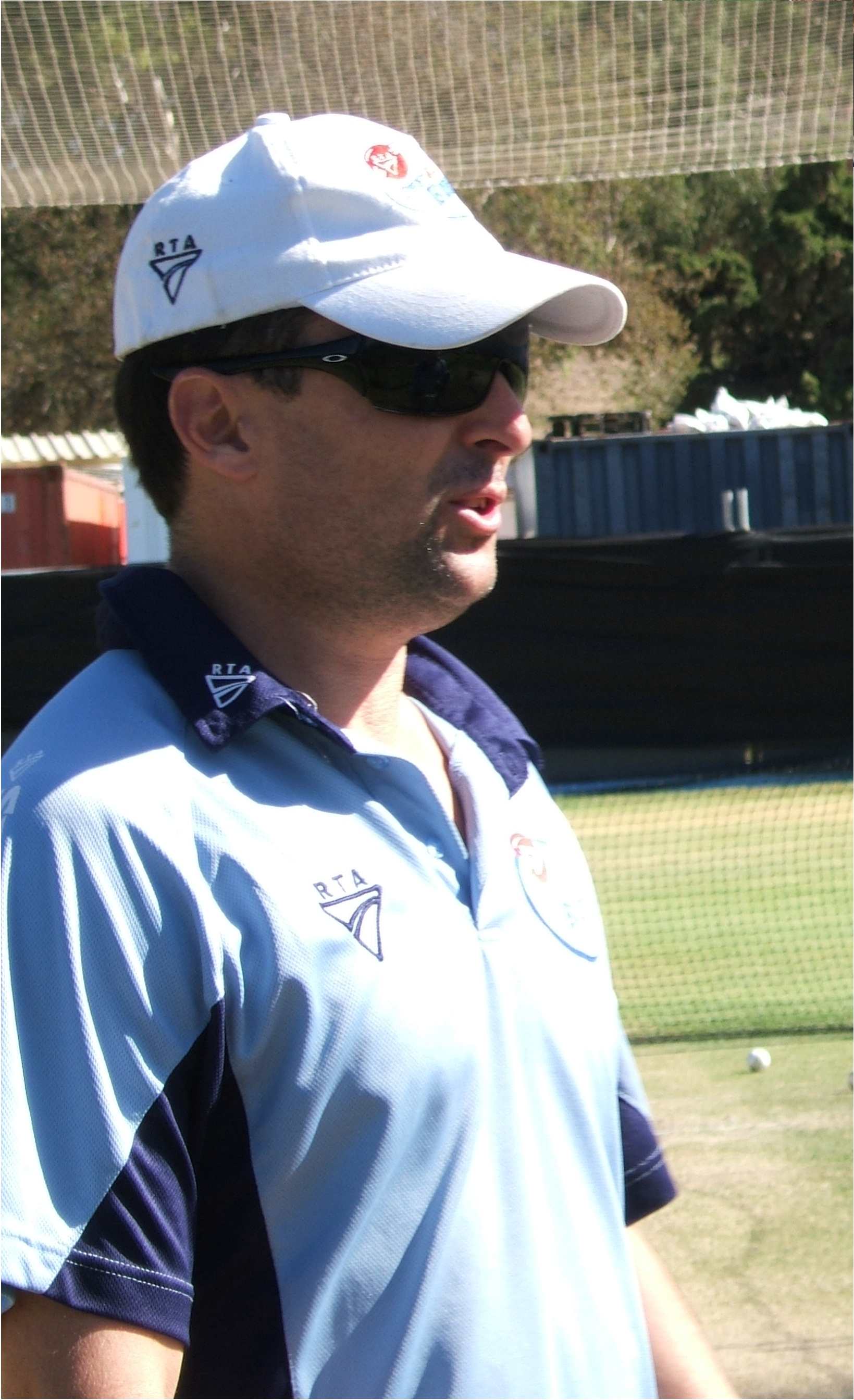

Personal information
- Full name: Matthew Peter Mott
- Born: 3 October 1973 (age 53); Charleville, Queensland, Australia
- Batting: Left-handed
- Bowling: Right-arm medium
- Role: Batsman

Domestic team information
- Years: Team
- 1994/95–1997/98: Queensland
- 1998/99–2003/04: Victoria

Head coaching information
- Years: Team
- 2007/08–2010/11: New South Wales
- 2011–2013: Glamorgan
- 2015–2022: Australia women
- 2022–2024: England Men (ODI and T20I)

Career statistics
Competition	First-class	List A
Matches	66	24
Runs scored	3,723	452
Batting average	33.84	22.60
100s/50s	7/20	0/2
Top score	216	55*
Balls bowled	856	165
Wickets	7	6
Bowling average	65.00	28.00
5 wickets in innings	0	0
10 wickets in match	0	0
Best bowling	3/35	2/2
Catches/stumpings	55/–	8/–
- Source: CricInfo, 30 July 2024

Matthew Peter Mott (born 3 October 1973) is an Australian cricket coach and a former first-class cricketer. He is the former coach of the Australian Women's Cricket Team. Mott also previously coached the England men's white-ball cricket team, and steered the side to victory in the 2022 T20 World Cup.

== Playing career ==
Mott played for the Victorian Bushrangers and Queensland Bulls. He was part of the Australian Cricket Academy in Adelaide in 1995. A left-handed batsman, he made his first-class debut in 1994–95, playing for Queensland. He was in and out of the side but made a crucial 86 in Queensland's 1996–97 Sheffield Shield Final. He relocated to Victoria for the 1998–99 season and performed well, cementing his spot in the upper order. His first season included centuries against New South Wales and Western Australia. He made 841 first-class runs the following summer to help Victoria reach the final for the first time in nine years. A highlight of his career with Victoria was a 223 run opening partnership with Jason Arnberger. He finished his 66-game career in 2004 with 3723 runs at 33.84 with seven hundreds.

== Coaching career ==
Mott was appointed head coach of the New South Wales Blues for the 2007–08 season, after two years as assistant coach. In his first season in charge, the side won the Pura Cup (Sheffield Shield), and later claimed victory in the 2009 Champions League T20 competition.

He signed a three-year contract as the 1st XI coach of Glamorgan County Cricket Club on 14 January 2011. On 20 August 2013, it was announced that Mott would be leaving his role with Glamorgan after the end of the season. He then led Glamorgan to the final of the 2013 Yorkshire Bank 40, where they lost to Nottinghamshire.

Mott was appointed coach of the Australia women's national cricket team in March 2015, replacing Cathryn Fitzpatrick. In April 2017, he was re-signed to coach the Australian women's team until 2020. In 2020, he coached the winning women's team at the T20 World Cup.

In May 2022, Mott was announced as the white-ball coach of the England cricket team.

In November 2022, Mott coached the England cricket team men's T20 side to victory over Pakistan in the ICC World Cup in Australia.

Mott left his job with England on 30 July 2024, after the team under-performed at the 2023 Cricket World Cup in India, then failed to progress beyond the semi-finals at the 2024 T20 World Cup in the West Indies and USA. Several sources suggested that he had stepped down voluntarily, whilst in the Times and the Guardian it was reported that he had been sacked. His role was assumed by Marcus Trescothick, pending the appointment of a permanent replacement.

In September 2024, Mott was appointed as the assistant coach of the Sydney Sixers Big Bash League side for a three-year contract. In July 2026, Mott was promoted to the role of head coach at the Sixers for the 2026/27 and 2027/28 seasons.
