= Jeff Vaughan =

Australian cricketer (born 1974)

Personal information
- Born: 26 March 1974 (age 52); Blacktown, New South Wales, Australia
- Source: Cricinfo, 29 September 2020

Jeff Vaughan (born 26 March 1974) is an Australian cricketer. He played in twenty-eight first-class and twenty-four List A matches for South Australia between 1996 and 2003. In July 2021, along with Michael Di Venuto, Vaughan was appointed as the assistant coach of the Australia national cricket team. He is also the head coach of the Hobart Hurricanes in the Big Bash League, which won their first title against Sydney Thunder in the 2024/25 season.

== See also ==
- List of South Australian representative cricketers
