= Cameron Green =

Australian cricketer (born 1999)

- Green in 2026

Personal information
- Full name: Cameron Donald Green
- Born: 3 June 1999 (age 27); Perth, Western Australia, Australia
- Height: 198 cm (6 ft 6 in)
- Batting: Right-handed
- Bowling: Right-arm fast-medium
- Role: Batting all-rounder

International information
- National side: Australia (2020–present)
- Test debut (cap 459): 17 December 2020 v India
- Last Test: 27 October 2026 v South Africa
- ODI debut (cap 230): 2 December 2020 v India
- Last ODI: 30 September 2026 v South Africa
- ODI shirt no.: 42
- T20I debut (cap 101): 5 April 2022 v Pakistan
- Last T20I: 20 February 2026 v Oman
- T20I shirt no.: 42

Domestic team information
- Years: Team
- 2016/17–present: Western Australia
- 2018/19–2019/20: Perth Scorchers
- 2023: Mumbai Indians
- 2024: Royal Challengers Bengaluru
- 2025: Gloucestershire
- 2026–present: Kolkata Knight Riders

Career statistics
Competition	Test	ODI	T20I	FC
Matches	40	40	28	82
Runs scored	2,012	991	638	5,329
Batting average	34.68	38.11	29.00	45.93
100s/50s	3/9	1/4	0/6	16/18
Top score	174*	118*	62*	251
Balls bowled	2,621	904	231	5,257
Wickets	39	21	14	83
Bowling average	39.82	41.38	25.00	35.44
5 wickets in innings	1	1	0	3
10 wickets in match	0	0	0	0
Best bowling	5/27	5/33	3/35	6/30
Catches/stumpings	42/–	24/–	25/–	70/–
Medal record
Men's cricket
Representing Australia
ICC Cricket World Cup
Winner	2023 India
ICC World Test Championship
Winner	2021–2023
Runner-up	2023–2025
- Source: ESPNcricinfo, 1 November 2026

Cameron Donald Green (born 3 June 1999) is an Australian international cricketer who plays as an all-rounder for Australia and Western Australia. He is a right handed batter and right-arm fast-medium bowler. He was a member of the Australian team that won the 2023 Cricket World Cup and the 2023 ICC World Test Championship final.

== Youth and domestic career ==
Green grew up in Subiaco, Perth and played for the Subiaco-Floreat Cricket Club in Western Australia Premier Cricket. He started playing in the 2009–10 season in the under 13s league, when he was 10 years old. His rapid development meant he made his WACA first grade debut at the age of 16. Green earned a rookie contract with the Western Australian Cricket Association (WACA) ahead of the 2016/17 Sheffield Shield season, largely thanks to averaging 82 runs per innings and taking 20 wickets in eight games in the under 19s national league.

=== Sheffield Shield ===
He made his first-class debut for Western Australia in the 2016–17 Sheffield Shield on 10 February 2017. He took 5/24 in the first innings to become the youngest player to take a five-wicket haul in the Sheffield Shield.

Originally a bowling all-rounder, Green began focusing on improving his batting following a series of injuries, his breakthrough performance being 87* and 121* against Queensland in the 2019–20 Sheffield Shield.

In March 2021, Green scored his maiden double century in first-class cricket, with 251 runs for Western Australia against Queensland in the 2020–21 Sheffield Shield.

=== Big Bash League ===
He made his Twenty20 debut for the Perth Scorchers in the 2018–19 Big Bash League on 13 January 2019.

=== Indian Premier League ===
In the IPL 2023 auction, Green was bought by the Mumbai Indians for INR 17.5 crore (approximately $3.15 million AUD), making him at-the-time second-most expensive overseas player in IPL auction history, and the most expensive Australian. On 27 November 2023, soon after the deadline for the player retentions ahead of IPL 2024, he was traded to Royal Challengers Bangalore after representing the Mumbai Indians for one season.

He moved to Kolkata Knight Riders for 2026, where he became the most expensive overseas player in IPL history.

=== English county cricket ===
In February 2025, Green signed a contract with Gloucestershire County Cricket Club to play in their first five county championship matches of the season. Green scored three centuries during the short stint.

== International career ==
Green made his List A debut for Cricket Australia XI against Pakistan during their tour of Australia on 10 January 2017. In October 2020, Green was named in Australia's squad for the limited overs matches against India. In November 2020, he was also named in Australia's Test squad for the matches against India. Green made his One Day International (ODI) debut for Australia against India on 2 December 2020. In a warm-up match before the Test series, Green scored a century for Australia A. He made his Test debut for Australia on 17 December 2020, against India.

In February 2022, Green was named in Australia's Twenty20 International (T20I) squad for their tour of Pakistan. He made his T20I debut on 5 April 2022, for Australia against Pakistan. In August 2022, he took his first ODI five-wicket haul, against Zimbabwe in Townsville. In the first ODI against New Zealand in Cairns, he was named player of the match after making 89 not out in a difficult run chase. In the T20I Series against India, Green scored two half-centuries.

In October 2022, Green was added to the Australian squad for the 2022 T20 World Cup as an injury replacement for Josh Inglis.

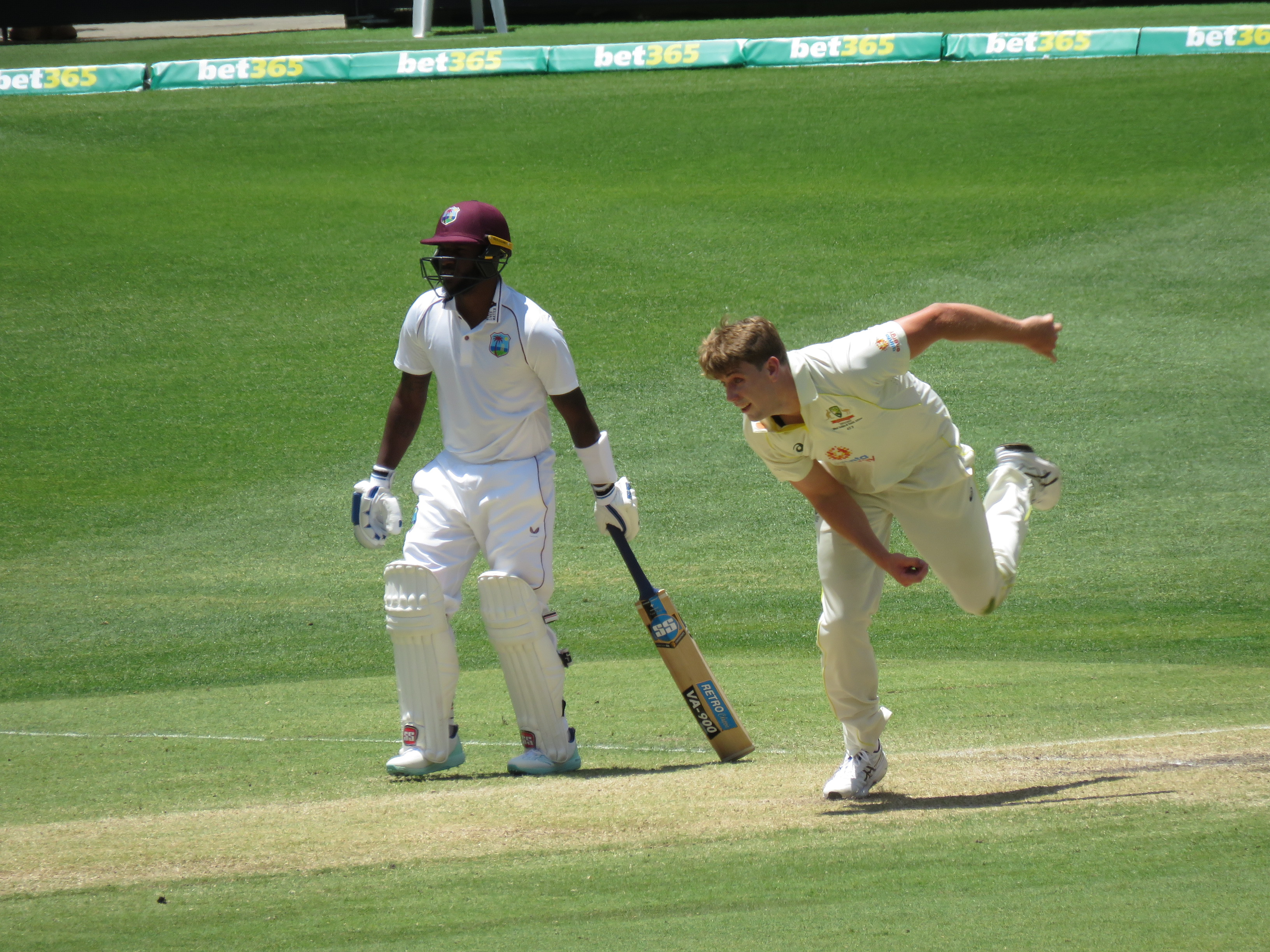
Green bowling during the first Test against the West Indies in December, 2022

In December 2022, Green picked up his maiden five-wicket haul in Test cricket while bowling in the first innings of the Boxing Day Test of the South Africa tour of Australia at the Melbourne Cricket Ground.

In the fourth Test in Ahmedabad of the 2023 Border–Gavaskar Trophy, Green scored his maiden Test century (114).

On 28 September 2023 Green was included in Australia's squad for the 2023 ODI World Cup. On 8 October 2023, Green made his World Cup debut against India. On 3 November 2023, Green made his only other appearance of the tournament scoring a vital 47 off 52 to help Australia defeat England.

After Green fell out of favour from Test selection during the 2023 Ashes, he was dropped from the test team to face Pakistan. However, following David Warner's retirement, Green was reintroduced to the squad, climbing the batting order to play his natural position at number 4. He debuted in this position for the 2024 series against the West Indies. This fresh start for Green paid dividends as he notched his second Test century against New Zealand on 29 February 2024 at the Basin Reserve. He finished the first day on 103* before putting on an impressive 116-run 10th wicket partnership with Josh Hazlewood, ending the 1st innings on 174*. This performance on an otherwise seam-friendly pitch earned Green a Player of the Match award.

In May 2024, he was named in Australia's squad for the 2024 ICC Men's T20 World Cup tournament.

During the 1st Test of the series against Bangladesh in August 2026, Green hit a century in the 3rd innings, making it his first Test century on home soil and his first since 2024.

== Personal life ==
Green was diagnosed with chronic kidney disease before birth.

== Records and achievements ==
=== International centuries ===
==== Test centuries ====
Runs	Match	Opponents	City	Venue	Year
114	20	India	Ahmedabad, India	Narendra Modi Stadium	2023
174*	27	New Zealand	Wellington, New Zealand	Basin Reserve	2024
104	38	Bangladesh	Darwin, Australia	TIO Stadium	2026

==== ODI centuries ====
Runs	Match	Opponents	City	Venue	Year
118*	31	South Africa	Mackay, Australia	Great Barrier Reef Arena	2025

=== International five-wicket hauls ===
==== Test five-wicket hauls ====
Wkts	Runs	Overs	Econ	Match	Batters	Opponents	City	Venue	Year
5	27	10.4	2.53	18	Theunis de Bruyn; Kyle Verreynne; Marco Jansen; Kagiso Rabada; Lungi Ngidi	South Africa	Melbourne, Australia	Melbourne Cricket Ground	2022

==== ODI five-wicket hauls ====
Wkts	Runs	Overs	Econ	Match	Batters	Opponents	City	Venue	Year
5	33	9	3.66	8	Sikandar Raza; Regis Chakabva; Ryan Burl; Luke Jongwe; Brad Evans	Zimbabwe	Townsville, Australia	Riverway Stadium	2022
