= Matt Renshaw =

Australian cricketer (born 1996)

- Renshaw in 2026

Personal information
- Full name: Matthew Thomas Renshaw
- Born: 28 March 1996 (age 30); Middlesbrough, North Yorkshire, England
- Nickname: The Turtle
- Height: 1.94 m (6 ft 4 in)
- Batting: Left-handed
- Bowling: Right-arm off break
- Role: Batter

International information
- National side: Australia (2016–present)
- Test debut (cap 449): 24 November 2016 v South Africa
- Last Test: 27 October 2026 v South Africa
- ODI debut (cap 251): 19 October 2025 v India
- Last ODI: 18 November 2026 v England
- ODI shirt no.: 7
- T20I debut (cap 116): 29 January 2026 v Pakistan
- Last T20I: 21 June 2026 v Bangladesh

Domestic team information
- Years: Team
- 2014/15–present: Queensland (squad no. 77)
- 2017/18–2019/20: Brisbane Heat (squad no. 77)
- 2018: Somerset (squad no. 77)
- 2019: Kent (squad no. 77)
- 2020/21–2021/22: Adelaide Strikers (squad no. 77)
- 2022: Somerset (squad no. 77)
- 2022/23–present: Brisbane Heat (squad no. 77)
- 2024: Somerset (squad no. 77)

Career statistics
Competition	Test	ODI	T20I	FC
Matches	18	18	9	137
Runs scored	1,022	595	233	8,565
Batting average	35.24	37.18	38.83	38.23
100s/50s	2/5	1/4	0/2	27/26
Top score	190	109	89*	200*
Balls bowled	210	402	36	1,860
Wickets	2	12	3	22
Bowling average	55.00	30.25	14.33	48.81
5 wickets in innings	0	0	0	0
10 wickets in match	0	0	0	0
Best bowling	2/30	3/51	2/26	3/29
Catches/stumpings	13/–	10/–	2/–	134/–
- Source: CricInfo, 18 November 2026

Matthew Thomas Renshaw (born 28 March 1996) is an Australian international cricketer. He played eleven Tests for Australia between 2016 and 2018 as an opening batsman, and was recalled to the Test team in 2023 and 2026 as a middle-order and top-order batsman respectively. He made his ODI debut in October 2025. In domestic first-class cricket he plays for Queensland, and in the Big Bash League he has played for the Brisbane Heat and Adelaide Strikers.

== Early life ==
Matt Renshaw was born in Middlesbrough, England. His family moved to New Zealand when he was seven, and then to Australia when he was ten. He attended Brisbane Grammar School.

== Domestic career ==
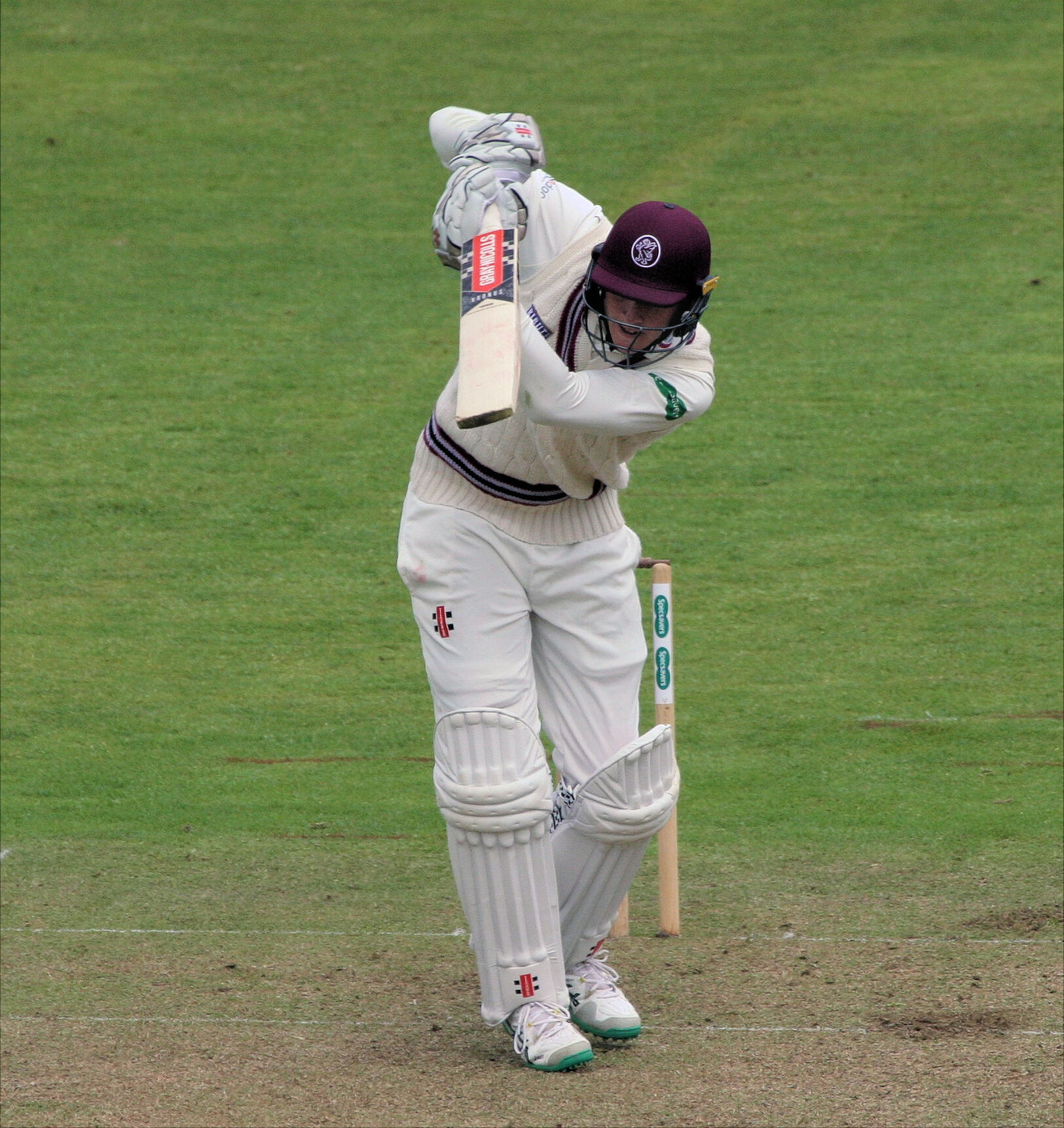
Renshaw batting for Somerset in 2018

=== Australia ===
He scored his maiden first-class century on 6 December 2015 in the 2015–16 Sheffield Shield against New South Wales. He made his List A debut for the National Performance Squad against India A on 27 August 2016.

In March 2018, Cricket Australia named Renshaw in their Sheffield Shield team of the year after making 686 runs. In December 2018, he made a record score for Brisbane senior cricket: 345 for Toombul off 273 balls, with 38 fours and 12 sixes.

Ahead of the 2019–20 Marsh One-Day Cup, Renshaw was named as one of the six cricketers to watch during the tournament.

From 2018 to 2019, he played for Brisbane Heat in Big Bash League before moving to Adelaide Strikers for the 2020–21 Big Bash League season. He also signed a three-year contract with the Adelaide Strikers in September 2020. After two seasons with Adelaide, he returned to the Brisbane Heat for the 2022–23 Big Bash League season.

=== England ===
Following the ball-tampering incident in South Africa, and the subsequent nine-month ban for Renshaw's international teammate Cameron Bancroft, Renshaw was signed to replace Bancroft as an international player at Somerset County Cricket Club for the 2018 English cricket season. He made his debut for Somerset on 20 April 2018 against Worcestershire, scoring 101 not out, exactly half of Somerset's first innings total of 202, and went on to score 513 runs at an average of 51.13 in six Championship matches for the county, scoring another century in his second match. He also scored 180 runs in six List A appearances for Somerset before his spell at the county was cut short following a broken finger.

In February 2019, Renshaw agreed to play for Kent County Cricket Club for the early stages of the season leading up to the 2019 Ashes series. Playing for Kent in a one-day match against Sussex on 21 April 2019 Renshaw top-scored with 109 off 111 balls In January 2022, Renshaw re-signed for Somerset ahead of the 2022 domestic season in England. In 2024, Renshaw returned to Somerset for a third stint.

== International career ==
Renshaw with Australia on their 2026–27 tour of South Africa

=== 2016–2018 ===
In November 2016 he was added to Australia's Test squad ahead of the third Test against South Africa. He made his Test debut on 24 November 2016 as an opening batsman, replacing his opening partner in Queensland, Joe Burns. His baggy green cap was presented by Ian Healy.

Renshaw scored his first Test century, 184, against Pakistan at the Sydney Cricket Ground in his fourth match. He became the 133rd Test centurion for Australia.

Renshaw became the first Australian cricketer to score 500 Test runs before turning 21 years of age and has scored the most number of Test runs before turning 21 years for Australia, with 524.

Renshaw played ten Tests in 2016 and 2017, but had poor form in the tours of India and Bangladesh in 2017, and lost his place in the Test team to Cameron Bancroft.

Following the 2018 Australian ball-tampering scandal and the suspension of Bancroft, David Warner and captain Steve Smith, Renshaw was recalled to the team for the fourth and final Test of the 2018 Test series against South Africa.

In April 2018, following the South African series, he was awarded a national contract by Cricket Australia for the 2018–19 season, and was in the Test squad for the tour of the UAE against Pakistan. However Renshaw suffered an injury in a warm-up game, and did not play in the Test series against Pakistan. He then had poor form the following summer and could not break back into the Test team. In April 2019, it was announced that Renshaw had not been offered a central Cricket Australia contract for the 2019–20 season.

=== 2022–2025 ===
In March 2022, Renshaw was added to Australia's One Day International (ODI) squad for their series against Pakistan, but did not play a game.

After being out of the Test team for more than four years, Renshaw was recalled in January 2023, in the final Test of the 2022–23 series against South Africa, batting in the middle order to replace the injured Cameron Green. He kept his place in the team in the first Test of the Australian tour of India in February–March 2023. He was initially dropped for the second Test, but played in the second innings as a concussion substitute, before being dropped again for the third Test.

Renshaw made his One Day International debut on 19 October 2025, against India at Perth Stadium, scoring 21 not out and hitting the winning run.

=== 2026–present ===
Renshaw was included in Australia's squad for the T20 series with Pakistan in early 2026 and made his Twenty20 International debut in the first match. Renshaw was timing the ball well and managing the run rate before being run out due to a miscommunication with Cameron Green.

In August 2026, Renshaw was called back to the Test squad for the first time in three years (2023) to play in the second Test against Bangladesh in Mackay, replacing Jake Weatherald in the squad. Placed as an opener alongside Travis Head, Renshaw went 8 (10) in Australia's only innings. The two-Test series against Bangladesh was ultimately drawn 1–1.

In September 2026, Renshaw was named in Australia's ODI and Test squads for their tour of Zimbabwe and South Africa, respectively. In the first match on the Zimbabwe tour, Renshaw, entering the match in the middle order, scored his maiden ODI century, hitting 109 runs off 94 balls in Harare. He scored a further 19 runs in the following two matches to finish the series with 128 runs combined, Australia's second-highest scoring batsman, in a 3–0 series whitewash. Renshaw played in all three of Australia's matches against South Africa in their ODI series, scoring 106 runs. In the final match, played at JB Marks Oval, Potchefstroom, Renshaw suffered a wrist injury while fielding and left the match. He was subsequently unfit for the remainder of the match which finished early after rain affected play. Australia, however, won the match by 45 runs via the DLS method.

In Australia's opening Test against South Africa in Durban, Renshaw was initially named as an opener before being put in the middle order, swapping positions with Nic Maddinson. Entering the match with Australia at 3/84, Renshaw scored 190 runs, his second Test century for Australia, and his highest batting score, to conclude Australia's first innings at 390 on day two. Renshaw also made a 134-run partnership with Nathan Lyon (27), the second-most for the ninth wicket for Australia in their Test history. Renshaw's 190 was followed by an 82 run showing in Australia's second innings. In South Africa's second innings, Renshaw claimed his maiden Test wicket. He finished with career best bowling figures of 2/30 after 13 overs. Australia won the first Test by 214 runs, with Renshaw named Player of the Match.

=== List of international centuries ===
List of Test centuries scored by Matt Renshaw
No.	Score	Opponent	Venue	Date	Result	Refs
1	184	Pakistan	Sydney Cricket Ground, Moore Park	3–7 January 2017	Won	
2	190	South Africa	Kingsmead Cricket Ground, Durban	9–13 October 2026	Won	

List of ODI centuries scored by Matt Renshaw
No.	Score	Opponent	Venue	Date	Result	Refs
1	109	Zimbabwe	Harare Sports Club, Harare	15 September 2026	Won	
