= 2026–27 Dean Jones Trophy =

Australian cricket competition

- Dates: 18 September 2026 – 14 February 2027
- Administrator: Cricket Australia
- Cricket format: List A
- Tournament format: Round-robin tournament
- Host(s): Adelaide; Brisbane; Hobart; Melbourne; Perth; Sydney
- Participants: 6
- Matches: 22
- Official website: One-Day Cup

The 2026–27 Dean Jones Trophy is the 58th season of the official List A domestic cricket competition played in Australia. The tournament runs from 18 September 2026 to 14 February 2027.

== Squads ==
2026–27 season squadsR = Rookie contract CA = Cricket Australia contract
New South Wales	Queensland	South Australia	Tasmania	Victoria	Western Australia
Lachlan Shaw (c); Charlie Anderson (R); Sean Abbott (c); Pat Cummins (CA); Joel Davies; Oliver Davies; Ben Dwarshuis; Jack Edwards; Ryan Hadley; Liam Hatcher; Josh Hazlewood (CA); Ryan Hicks; Bryce Jackson; Riley Kingsell; Sam Konstas; Nathan Lyon (CA); Nic Maddinson; Jack Nisbet; Kurtis Patterson; Josh Philippe; Will Salzmann; Tanveer Sangha; Harjas Singh (R); Steve Smith (CA); Mitchell Starc (CA); Charlie Stobo; Jake Scott (R)	Marnus Labuschagne (CA) (c); Tom Balkin; Xavier Bartlett (CA); Hugo Burdon; Jack Clayton; Cameron Gannon; Lachlan Hearne; Hayden Kerr; Angus Lovell; Dylan McLachlan; Michael Neser (CA); Jimmy Peirson; Matthew Renshaw; Jem Ryan; Jack Sinfield; Mark Steketee; Tom Straker; Mitchell Swepson; Callum Vidler; Hugh Weibgen; Tom Whitney; Jack Wildermuth; Adam Zampa (CA); Tom Campbell (R); Steven Hogan (R); Charlie Lachmund (R); Oli Patterson (R)	Ben Manenti (c); Wes Agar; Jordan Buckingham; Alex Carey (CA); Brendan Doggett (CA); Jake Fraser-McGurk; Matthew Gilkes; Travis Head (CA); Henry Hunt; Hanno Jacobs; Spencer Johnson; Jake Lehmann; Nathan McAndrew; Noah McFadyen; Nathan McSweeney; Harry Nielsen; Lloyd Pope; Henry Thornton; Campbell Thompson; Jason Sangha; Liam Scott; Mackenzie Harvey; Jerrssis Wadia; Jake Weatherald (CA); Thomas Brown (R); Kane Halfpenny (R); Douwtjie Hoogenboezem (R); Hayden Schiller (R)	Jordan Silk (c); Marcus Bean; Gabe Bell; Jackson Bird; Iain Carlisle; Nikhil Chaudhary; Tim David; Jake Doran; Nathan Ellis (CA); Brad Hope; Caleb Jewell; Matthew Kuhnemann (CA); Raf MacMillan; Caelan Maladay; Ben McDermott; Riley Meredith; Lawrence Neil-Smith; Mitch Owen; Will Prestwidge; Nivethan Radhakrishnan; Billy Stanlake; Tim Ward; Beau Webster (CA); Teague Wyllie; Kasey Barton (R); Zac Curtain (R); Aidan O'Connor (R); Nitesh Samuel (R); William Taylor (R)	Will Sutherland (c); Austin Anlezark; Liam Blackford; Scott Boland (CA); Dylan Brasher; Ashley Chandrasinghe; Harry Dixon; Sam Elliott; Peter Handscomb; Sam Harper; Marcus Harris; Campbell Kellaway; Blake Macdonald; Cam McClure; David Moody (cricketer); Todd Murphy (CA); Fergus O'Neill; Oliver Peake; Mitch Perry; Tyler Pearson; Tom Rogers; Doug Warren; Harry Hoekstra (R); Tom Paddington (R); Aryan Sharma (R)	Ashton Turner (c); Cameron Bancroft; Mahli Beardman; Hilton Cartwright; Cooper Connolly; Brody Couch; Joel Curtis; Kieran Elliott; Sam Fanning; Jayden Goodwin; Cameron Green (CA); Aaron Hardie; Liam Haskett; Josh Inglis (CA); Will Malajczuk; Mitchell Marsh (CA); Tom Murray; Lance Morris; Joel Paris; Jhye Richardson; Corey Rocchiccioli; Sam Whiteman; Simon Budge (R); Albert Esterhuysen (R); Jordan Quiggin (R); Corey Wasley (R)

== Points table ==
Pos	Team	Pld	W	L	T	NR	BP	Ded	Pts	NRR	Qualification
1	South Australia	5	4	0	0	1	3	0	21	2.060	Advance to the final
2	Tasmania	5	3	2	0	0	3	0	15	0.887	Advance to the final
3	New South Wales	5	3	2	0	0	1	0	13	−0.460	
4	Victoria	5	2	3	0	0	1	0	9	0.074	
5	Western Australia	5	1	3	0	1	0	0	6	−1.465	
6	Queensland	5	1	4	0	0	0	0	4	−0.744	

Updated to match(es) played on 19 November 2026. Source: Cricinfo

Points system:

- Win: 4 points
- Tie: 2 points
- No result: 2 points
- Loss: 0 points
- A bonus point is awarded if the winning team had a run rate of 1.25 more than the opposition.

== Fixtures ==
18 September 2026
14:00 (D/N)
- Scorecard

(H) Western Australia; 9/238 (50 overs)	v	South Australia; 0/58 (7.4 overs)
Kieran Elliott 53* (71); Henry Thornton 4/52 (9 overs)		Jake Fraser-McGurk 46* (33); Kieran Elliott 0/27 (3.4 overs)

No result
WACA Ground, Perth
Umpires: Troy Penman and Ben Treloar

- South Australia won the toss and elected to field.
- Jerrssis Wadia (South Australia) and Kieran Elliott (Western Australia) both made their List A debuts.
- Points: Western Australia 2, South Australia 2.

19 September 2026
14:00 (D/N)
- Scorecard

(H) Queensland; 7/335 (50 overs)	v	Victoria; 7/339 (49.5 overs)
Hugo Burdon 73 (70); Doug Warren 2/54 (10 overs)		Liam Blackford 149* (113); Tom Straker 4/50 (10 overs)

Victoria won by 3 wickets
Allan Border Field, Brisbane
Umpires: Donovan Koch and Riki Wessels
Player of the match: Liam Blackford (Victoria)

- Victoria won the toss and elected to field.
- Doug Warren, Harry Hoekstra and Liam Blackford (Victoria) made their List A debuts.
- Points: Victoria 4, Queensland 0.

20 September 2026
14:00 (D/N)
- Scorecard

(H) Western Australia; 115 (30.2 overs)	v	Tasmania; 1/117 (16.2 overs)
Cameron Bancroft 19 (35); Riley Meredith 4/11 (8 overs)		Mitchell Owen 43 (29); Brody Couch 1/28 (5 overs)

Tasmania won by 9 wickets
WACA Ground, Perth
Umpires: Troy Penman and Ben Treloar
Player of the match: Riley Meredith (Tasmania)

- Tasmania won the toss and elected to field.
- Marcus Bean (Tasmania) made his List A debut.
- Points: Tasmania 5, Western Australia 0.

22 September 2026
14:00 (D/N)
Scorecard

(H) Queensland; 358 (49.5 overs)	v	New South Wales; 6/359 (49 overs)
Hugh Weibgen 125 (89); Ben Dwarshuis 3/57 (10 overs)		Riley Kingsell 79 (82); Hayden Kerr 2/68 (10 overs)

New South Wales won by 4 wickets
Allan Border Field, Brisbane
Umpires: Donovan Koch and Claire Polosak
Player of the match: William Salzmann (New South Wales)

- New South Wales won the toss and elected to field.
- Riley Kingsell and Jake Scott (New South Wales) made their List A debuts.
- Points: New South Wales 4, Queensland 0.

23 September 2026
10:00
Scorecard

(H) South Australia; 7/383 (50 overs)	v	Tasmania; 8/376 (50 overs)
Matthew Gilkes 97* (65); Mitchell Owen 2/39 (5 overs)		Jordan Silk 142 (106); Nathan McAndrew 2/72 (10 overs)

South Australia won by 7 runs
Karen Rolton Oval, Adelaide
Umpires: Gerard Abood and Eloise Sheridan
Player of the match: Jordan Silk (Tasmania)

- Tasmania won the toss and elected to field.
- Points: South Australia 4, Tasmania 0.

25 September 2026
14:00 (D/N)
Scorecard

New South Wales; 257 (48.5 overs)	v	Victoria (H); 212 (44.5 overs)
Nic Maddinson 126 (127); Harry Hoekstra 5/42 (7.5 overs)		Matthew Short 46 (52); Jake Scott 3/48 (6.5 overs)

New South Wales won by 47 runs (DLS method)
Junction Oval, Melbourne
Umpires: Shawn Craig and Michael Graham-Smith
Player of the match: Nic Maddinson (New South Wales)

- New South Wales won the toss and elected to bat.
- The match was reduced to 49 overs per side due to rain.
- Victoria were set a revised target of 260 runs.
- Joe Colgan (NSW) made his List A debut.
- Points: New South Wales 4, Victoria 0.

12 October 2026
14:00 (D/N)
Scorecard

South Australia; 311 (49.3 overs)	v	Victoria (H); 241 (43.5 overs)
Matthew Gilkes 127 (115); Fergus O'Neill 3/47 (10 overs)		Liam Blackford 50 (69); Wes Agar 3/35 (8 overs)

South Australia won by 70 runs
Junction Oval, Melbourne
Umpires: Chris Grant and Sam Nogajski
Player of the match: Matthew Gilkes (South Australia)

- Victoria won the toss and elected to field.
- Points: South Australia 5, Victoria 0.

13 October 2026
10:00
Scorecard

Tasmania; 203 (29.1 overs)	v	New South Wales (H); 158 (26 overs)
Will Prestwidge 71 (56); Jake Scott 3/50 (6 overs)		Jake Scott 32* (32); Raf MacMillan 3/29 (6 overs)

Tasmania won by 57 runs (DLS method)
Cricket Central, Sydney
Umpires: Mitchell Claydon and Donovan Koch
Player of the match: Will Prestwidge (Tasmania)

- New South Wales won the toss and elected to field.
- The match was reduced to 30 overs per side due to rain.
- New South Wales were set a revised target of 216 runs.
- Reiley Mark, Ryan Hicks (New South Wales) and Jack Montgomery (Tasmania) all made their List A debuts.
- Points: Tasmania 5, New South Wales 0.

13 October 2026
14:00 (D/N)
Scorecard

Queensland; 261 (45.2 overs)	v	Western Australia (H); 246 (44 overs)
Hugh Weibgen 103 (85); Brody Couch 3/48 (10 overs)		Joel Curtis 63 (76); Hayden Kerr 3/31 (8 overs)

Queensland won by 15 runs
WACA Ground, Perth
Umpires: Shawn Craig and Troy Penman
Player of the match: Hugh Weibgen (Queensland)

- Western Australia won the toss and elected to field.
- Jordan Quiggin (Western Australia) made his List A debut.
- Points: Queensland 4, Western Australia 0.

17 October 2026
10:30
Scorecard

(H) South Australia; 7/397 (50 overs)	v	Queensland; 271 (40.1 overs)
Jake Fraser-McGurk 122 (63); Hayden Kerr 3/67 (10 overs)		Lachlan Hearne 121 (104); Spencer Johnson 5/59 (9.1 overs)

South Australia won by 126 runs
Karen Rolton Oval, Adelaide
Umpires: Andrew Crozier and Peter George
Player of the match: Jake Fraser-McGurk (South Australia)

- Queensland won the toss and elected to field.
- Points: South Australia 5, Queensland 0.

24 October 2026
10:30
Scorecard

Victoria; 7/304 (50 overs)	v	Tasmania (H); 137 (25.2 overs)
Matthew Short 70 (91); Tom Rogers 2/70 (10 overs)		Caleb Jewell 47* (63); Mitchell Perry 4/9 (6 overs)

Victoria won by 138 runs (DLS method)
Bellerive Oval, Hobart
Umpires: Riki Wessels and Troy Penman
Player of the match: Mitchell Perry (Victoria)

- Tasmania won the toss and elected to field.
- Tasmania were set a revised target of 276 runs from 35 overs due to rain.
- Matt Hennig (Victoria) made his List A debut.
- Points: Victoria 5, Tasmania 0.

24 October 2026
14:00 (D/N)
Scorecard

New South Wales; 8/371 (50 overs)	v	Western Australia (H); 293 (46.3 overs)
Sam Konstas 149 (131); Ashton Agar 2/60 (10 overs)		Sam Whiteman 116 (113); Jack Nisbet 3/47 (9 overs)

New South Wales won by 78 runs
WACA Ground, Perth
Umpires: Michael Graham-Smith and Mitchell Claydon
Player of the match: Sam Konstas (New South Wales)

- New South Wales won the toss and elected to bat.
- Corey Wasley (Western Australia) made his List A debut.
- Points: New South Wales 5, Western Australia 0.

16 November 2026
10:00
Scorecard

South Australia; 3/236 (32.2 overs)	v	(H) New South Wales; 108 (15.4 overs)
Mackenzie Harvey 58 (49); Tanveer Sangha 1/39 (6 overs)		Riley Kingsell 37 (17); Henry Thornton 4/40 (5.4 overs)

South Australia won by 172 runs (DLS method)
Cricket Central, Sydney
Umpires: Michael Graham-Smith and Sharad Patel
Player of the match: Jake Fraser-McGurk (South Australia)

- New South Wales won the toss and elected to field.
- New South Wales were set a revised target of 281 runs from 32 overs due to rain.
- Hayden Schiller (South Australia) made his List A debut.
- Points: South Australia 5, New South Wales 0.

16 November 2026
10:00
Scorecard

(H) Queensland; 9/241 (50 overs)	v	Tasmania; 3/164 (29.2 overs)
Hugo Burdon 87 (94); Billy Stanlake 3/45 (10 overs)		Beau Webster 68* (80); Hayden Kerr 1/15 (3 overs)

Tasmania won by 47 runs (DLS method)
The Gabba, Brisbane
Umpires: Parashar Joshi and Riki Wessels
Player of the match: Beau Webster (Tasmania)

- Tasmania won the toss and elected to field.
- No further play was possible due to rain. Tasmania par score was 117 runs.
- Points: Tasmania 5, Queensland 0.

16 November 2026
14:00 (D/N)
Scorecard

(H) Victoria; 9/268 (50 overs)	v	Western Australia; 9/272 (49.1 overs)
Blake Macdonald 86 (98); Michael Dawson 3/46 (9 overs)		Joel Curtis 75 (73); Matt Hennig 6/46 (10 overs)

Western Australia won by 1 wicket
Junction Oval, Melbourne
Umpires: Phillip Gillespie and Troy Penman
Player of the match: Ashton Turner (Western Australia)

- Victoria won the toss and elected to bat.
- Michael Dawson (Western Australia) made his List A debut.
- Points: Western Australia 4, Victoria 0.

1 February 2027
10:00
Scorecard

(H) New South Wales	v	Victoria

Cricket Central, Sydney

2 February 2027
11:00
Scorecard

(H) South Australia	v	Western Australia

Karen Rolton Oval, Adelaide

2 February 2027
14:00 (D/N)
Scorecard

(H) Tasmania	v	Queensland

Bellerive Oval, Hobart

5 February 2027
14:00 (D/N)
Scorecard

(H) Queensland	v	Western Australia

Allan Border Field, Brisbane

5 February 2027
14:00 (D/N)
Scorecard

(H) Tasmania	v	New South Wales

Bellerive Oval, Hobart

5 February 2027
11:00
Scorecard

(H) South Australia	v	Victoria

Karen Rolton Oval, Adelaide

== Final ==
2027
14:00
Scorecard

v

== Television coverage ==
Every match of the 2026–27 One-Day Cup will be streamed live by Cricket Australia through their website and the CA Live app. Kayo Sports also streamed all 22 matches. Fox Cricket broadcast four matches, including the final.

=== Match reports ===
Match reports
Match	Reports	
Match	Cricinfo	Cricket Australia
1		
2		
3		
4		
5		
6		
7		
8		
9		
10		

== See also ==
- 2026–27 Sheffield Shield season
