= List of 2026–27 Big Bash League personnel signings =

2026–27 Big Bash League personnel signings

General information
- Sport: Cricket
- Date: 26 August 2026 – present

Overview
- League: Big Bash League
- Team: 8

This is a list of personnel signings for the 2026–27 Big Bash League season cricket tournament.

== Background ==
Each team is allowed to sign an 18-player squad, including a maximum of 12 players signed before 27 August 2026. Teams are allowed to sign additional replacement players in the instance that one of their players is unavailable. Following the removal of the International Player Draft, teams are able to sign foreign players directly.

Michael Archer joined the Melbourne Renegades becomes the first player to sign on after the lifting of the Big Bash's contract embargo. Michael Neser signed a two-year contract extension with the Brisbane Heat Ben Stokes joined the Adelaide Strikers Perth Scorchers sign England leg-spinner Calvin Harrison for BBL |16. Victorian duo Callum Stow and Sam Elliott signing with the Melbourne Renegades. Todd Murphy signing with the Melbourne Stars Tom Curran signs for Brisbane Heat Adam Zampa signed a two-year contract with the Hobart Hurricanes New Zealand keeper-batter Tim Seifert has signed a one-year deal with Sydney Sixers New Zealand Finn Allen has been lured out of Perth Scorchers and is heading to the Melbourne Stars Tim Robinson signing with the Brisbane Heat for BBL |16. Melbourne Stars signing England twins, Craig Overton and Jamie Overton. Mark Chapman signing with the Adelaide Strikers for BBL |16. Usman Khawaja has re-signed with the Brisbane Heat. Sydney Sixers have signed Riley Kingsell. Western Australia allrounder Will Malajczuk has signed with Perth Scorchers. New Zealand Lockie Ferguson signing with Sydney Thunder for BBL |16. Nic Maddinson has re-signed with Sydney Thunder for BBL |16. West Indies white-ball captain Shai Hope signing with Hobart Hurricanes for BBL |16. England opener Zak Crawley signing with Perth Scorchers. Sydney Sixers have signed promising allrounder Jake Scott on a one-year deal for BBL |16. Perth Scorchers re-signing fast bowler Brody Couch and wicketkeeper-batter Joel Curtis for BBL |16. Jonny Bairstow signing with Melbourne Renegades for BBL |16. Nick Hobson will call the Hobart Hurricanes home for the next two season. Melbourne Renegades signing New Zealand all-rounder Michael Bracewell. New Zealand Bevon Jacobs signing with Brisbane Heat for opening three matches as an International Replacement Player. England allrounder Chris Jordan will make his return to the Sydney Sixers for BBL |16. Ben Manenti signing a two-year deal with Melbourne Renegades. Sydney Sixers signing Western Australia off-spinner Corey Rocchiccioli for BBL |16. Sydney Thunder signing left-arm quick Trent Boult for BBL |16. Bangladesh leg spinner Rishad Hossain will be representing Hobart Hurricanes for the second season. Jafer Chohan signing with Sydney Sixers for a third consecutive season. Wicketkeeper Jimmy Peirson re-signing with the Brisbane Heat. New South Wales-born allrounder Will Salzmann will line up for the Sydney Thunder in BBL |16. New England T20 opener Aneurin Donald signs for Perth Scorchers. Adelaide Strikers signing Pakistan Haris Rauf for BBL |16. Mustafizur Rahman signing with Melbourne Renegades for BBL |16. Sydney Thunder signing 20-year-old Victoria fast bowler Harry Hoekstra for BBL |16. Perth Scorchers signing emerging speedster Albert Esterhuysen for BBL |16.

== Pre-signed ==
Contracted for BBL |16
Adelaide Strikers	Brisbane Heat	Hobart Hurricanes	Melbourne Renegades	Melbourne Stars	Perth Scorchers	Sydney Sixers	Sydney Thunder
Alex Carey; Mackenzie Harvey; Thomas Kelly; Lloyd Pope; Jason Sangha; Liam Scott; Matt Short (c); Tom Straker; Henry Thornton; Jerrssis Wadia	Xavier Bartlett; Max Bryant; Lachlan Hearne; Spencer Johnson; Matthew Kuhnemann; Nathan McSweeney; Matt Renshaw; Callum Vidler; Hugh Weibgen; Jack Wildermuth	Nikhil Chaudhary; Tim David; Nathan Ellis (c); Ben McDermott; Riley Meredith; Mitchell Owen; Billy Stanlake; Matthew Wade; Jake Weatherald; Beau Webster	Jason Behrendorff; Josh Brown; Harry Dixon; Brendan Doggett; Jake Fraser-McGurk; Caleb Jewell; Oliver Peake; Tom Rogers; Will Sutherland (c)	Austin Anlezark; Hilton Cartwright; Sam Harper; Liam Hatcher; Campbell Kellaway; Glenn Maxwell; Tom Rogers; Peter Siddle; Marcus Stoinis (c); Mitchell Swepson	Ashton Agar; Mahli Beardman; Cooper Connolly; Aaron Hardie; Mitchell Marsh; Lance Morris; Joel Paris; Jhye Richardson; Ashton Turner	Sean Abbott; Joel Davies; Oliver Davies; Ben Dwarshuis; Jack Edwards; Hayden Kerr; Fergus O'Neill; Josh Philippe; Lachlan Shaw; Jordan Silk; Steve Smith	Cameron Bancroft; Sam Billings (ENG); Matthew Gilkes; Chris Green; Ryan Hadley; Sam Konstas; Aidan O'Connor; Daniel Sams; Tanveer Sangha; David Warner

As of 26 August 2026

Notes

- Unless otherwise specified, all players are Australian.

== Direct signings ==
The following players were directly signed by teams ahead of the 2026–27 season.

Player	Team
Michael Archer	Melbourne Renegades
Michael Neser	Brisbane Heat
Callum Stow	Melbourne Renegades
Sam Elliott	Melbourne Renegades
Todd Murphy	Melbourne Stars
Adam Zampa	Hobart Hurricanes
Usman Khawaja	Brisbane Heat
Riley Kingsell	Sydney Sixers
Will Malajczuk	Perth Scorchers
Nic Maddinson	Sydney Thunder
Brody Couch	Perth Scorchers
Joel Curtis	Perth Scorchers
Jake Scott	Sydney Sixers
Nick Hobson	Hobart Hurricanes
Ben Manenti	Melbourne Renegades
Corey Rocchiccioli	Sydney Sixers
Jimmy Peirson	Brisbane Heat
Will Salzmann	Sydney Thunder
Harry Hoekstra	Sydney Thunder
Albert Esterhuysen	Perth Scorchers

== Overseas signings ==
The following players were directly signed by teams ahead of the 2026–27 season.

Overseas signings for the 2026–27 Big Bash League season
Player	Nationality	Team	Ref.
Ben Stokes	England	Adelaide Strikers	
Calvin Harrison	England	Perth Scorchers	
Tom Curran	England	Brisbane Heat	
Tim Seifert	New Zealand	Sydney Sixers	
Finn Allen	New Zealand	Melbourne Stars	
Tim Robinson	New Zealand	Brisbane Heat	
Craig Overton	England	Melbourne Stars	
Jamie Overton	England	Melbourne Stars	
Mark Chapman	New Zealand	Adelaide Strikers	
Lockie Ferguson	New Zealand	Sydney Thunder	
Shai Hope	West Indies	Hobart Hurricanes	
Zak Crawley	England	Perth Scorchers	
Jonny Bairstow	England	Melbourne Renegades	
Michael Bracewell	New Zealand	Melbourne Renegades	
Bevon Jacobs	New Zealand	Brisbane Heat	
Chris Jordan	England	Sydney Sixers	
Rishad Hossain	Bangladesh	Hobart Hurricanes	
Trent Boult	New Zealand	Sydney Thunder	
Jafer Chohan	England	Sydney Sixers	
Aneurin Donald	England	Perth Scorchers	
Haris Rauf	Pakistan	Adelaide Strikers	
Mustafizur Rahman	Bangladesh	Melbourne Renegades	

== See also ==
- List of 2026–27 Women's Big Bash League personnel signings

== External link ==
- Official website
