= 2026–27 Sheffield Shield season =

Australian cricket competition

2026–27 Sheffield Shield
- Dates: 7 October 2026 – 29 March 2027
- Administrator: Cricket Australia
- Cricket format: First-class
- Tournament format(s): Double round-robin and final
- Participants: 6
- Matches: 31
- Official website: 2026–27 Sheffield Shield

The 2026–27 Sheffield Shield season is the 125th season of the Australian interstate domestic first-class cricket competition. Cricket Australia revealed the season fixtures in July 2026. The season started on 7 October 2026, and the final is scheduled to be played from 25 to 29 March 2027.

== Teams ==
Team	Home ground(s)	Captain	Head coach
New South Wales	Cricket Central; Sydney Cricket Ground	Nic Maddinson	Brad Haddin
Queensland	Allan Border Field; The Gabba	Marnus Labuschagne	James Hopes
South Australia	Adelaide Oval	Nathan McSweeney	Ryan Harris
Tasmania	Bellerive Oval	Jordan Silk	Jeff Vaughan
Victoria	Junction Oval; Melbourne Cricket Ground	Will Sutherland	Chris Rogers
Western Australia	Perth Stadium; WACA Ground	Aaron Hardie	Beau Casson

Grounds used during the 2026–27 Sheffield Shield season.

== Points table ==
Pos	Team	Pld	W	L	T	D	Bat	Bowl	Ded	Pts	Qualification
1	Western Australia	4	2	0	0	2	3.15	2.8	0	19.95	Advance to the final
2	Queensland	4	2	1	0	1	3.12	4	1	19.12	Advance to the final
3	Tasmania	4	2	1	0	1	2.31	3.5	0	18.81	
4	New South Wales	4	1	1	0	2	4.81	3.4	0	16.21	
5	South Australia	4	1	3	0	0	2.67	3.4	0	12.07	
6	Victoria	4	0	2	0	2	2.58	2.9	0	7.48	

Updated to match(es) played on 14 November 2026. Source: Cricket.com.au, Cricinfo

== Round–robin ==
=== Round 1 ===
7–10 October 2026
Scorecard

(H) Victoria	v	South Australia
244 (84.3 overs); Harry Hoekstra 45 (122); Henry Thornton 3/51 (13 overs)		508 (135.3 overs); Noah McFadyen 134 (174); Harry Hoekstra 6/103 (27 overs)
224 (90.4 overs); Fergus O'Neill 62 (110); Nathan McAndrew 3/36 (17 overs)

South Australia won by an innings and 40 runs
Junction Oval, Melbourne
Umpires: Ben Treloar and Sam Nogajski
Player of the match: Ben Manenti (South Australia)

- South Australia won the toss and elected to field.
- Harry Hoekstra, Liam Blackford (Victoria) and Noah McFadyen (South Australia) all made their first-class debuts.
- Points: South Australia 8.39, Victoria 1.04.

8–11 October 2026
Scorecard

Tasmania	v	New South Wales (H)
245 (96.2 overs); Ben McDermott 77 (148); Jake Scott 5/35 (16.2 overs)		9/500d (97.2 overs); Oliver Davies 253 (225); Marcus Bean 5/111 (21 overs)
5/402 (153 overs); Caleb Jewell 88 (159); Sean Abbott 4/54 (28 overs)

Match drawn
Cricket Central, Sydney
Umpires: Donovan Koch and Gerard Abood
Player of the match: Oliver Davies (New South Wales)

- New South Wales won the toss and elected to field.
- Bryce Jackson, Jake Scott, Riley Kingsell, Reiley Mark (New South Wales), Caelan Maladay, Marcus Bean and Will Prestwidge (Tasmania) all made their first-class debuts.
- Points: New South Wales 5, Tasmania 2.35.

8–11 October 2026
Scorecard

Queensland	v	Western Australia (H)
307 (90.3 overs); Jimmy Peirson 101* (146); Albert Esterhuysen 4/43 (9.3 overs)		175 (73.1 overs); Sam Fanning 64 (149); Xavier Bartlett 5/48 (20.1 overs)
68 (25.1 overs); Hayden Kerr 22 (29); Jhye Richardson 5/19 (9.1 overs)		8/201 (72.5 overs); Aaron Hardie 80* (128); Xavier Bartlett 4/53 (24.5 overs)

Western Australia won by 2 wickets
WACA Ground, Perth
Umpires: Shawn Craig and Troy Penman
Player of the match: Aaron Hardie (Western Australia)

- Western Australia won the toss and elected to field.
- Only 74.1 overs play was possible on day 1 due to rain and bad light.
- Tom Murray (Western Australia) made his first-class debut.
- Points: Western Australia 7, Queensland 1.07.

=== Round 2 ===
19–22 October 2026
Scorecard

(H) Tasmania	v	Victoria
241 (89.2 overs); Ben McDermott 128 (197); Harry Hoekstra 5/46 (20 overs)		207 (61.1 overs); Marcus Harris 54 (119); Mitchell Owen 4/58 (13 overs)
236 (85.3 overs); Nikhil Chaudhary 81 (123 overs); Harry Hoekstra 4/52 (18.3 overs)		266 (85 overs); Liam Blackford 80 (139); Gabe Bell 6/72 (25 overs)

Tasmania won by 4 runs
Bellerive Oval, Hobart
Umpires: Riki Wessels and Sam Nogajski
Player of the match: Ben McDermott (Tasmania)

- Tasmania won the toss and elected to bat.
- Points: Tasmania 7.41, Victoria 1.07.

19–21 October 2026
Scorecard

(H) South Australia	v	Queensland
203 (68.1 overs); Jake Lehmann 62 (113); Cameron Gannon 5/42 (19 overs)		238 (77.4 overs); Jack Clayton 66 (129); Brendan Doggett 3/46 (20 overs)
145 (47.3 overs); Ben Manenti 39 (83); Xavier Bartlett 5/52 (15.3 overs)		4/114 (36.4 overs); Jimmy Peirson 48* (69); Nathan McAndrew 2/26 (9 overs)

Queensland won by 6 wickets
Adelaide Oval, Adelaide
Umpires: Andrew Crozier and Roberto Howard
Player of the match: Xavier Bartlett (Queensland)

- Queensland won the toss and elected to field.
- Points: Queensland 7.38, South Australia 1.03.

19–22 October 2026
Scorecard

New South Wales	v	Western Australia (H)
6/440d (110 overs); Kurtis Patterson 122 (214); Jhye Richardson 2/78 (18 overs)		339 (105.1 overs); Kieran Elliott 79 (161); Jack Edwards 4/42 (22 overs)
5/262d (51.3 overs); Sam Konstas 151* (167); Corey Rocchiccioli 3/90 (19 overs)		9/244 (111 overs); Jayden Goodwin 67 (165); Ben Dwarshuis 4/50 (22 overs)

Match drawn
WACA Ground, Perth
Umpires: Michael Graham-Smith and Mitch Claydon
Player of the match: Sam Konstas (New South Wales)

- New South Wales won the toss and elected to bat.
- Corey Wasley (Western Australia) made his first-class debut.
- Points: New South Wales 3.65, Western Australia 2.77.

=== Round 3 ===
28–31 October 2026
Scorecard

Western Australia	v	South Australia (H)
5/406d (116 overs); Cameron Bancroft 186 (341); Brendan Doggett 2/78 (25 overs)		154 (37.1 overs); Jake Weatherald 40 (30); Jhye Richardson 3/29 (9 overs)
169 (61.5 overs); Ashton Agar 48 (101); Brendan Doggett 4/51 (16 overs)		316 (100.2 overs); Mackenzie Harvey 90 (143); Ashton Agar 3/62 (27 overs)

Western Australia won by 105 runs
Adelaide Oval, Adelaide
Umpires: Andrew Crozier and Sharad Patel
Player of the match: Cameron Bancroft (Western Australia)

- Western Australia won the toss and elected to bat.
- Points: Western Australia 8.26, South Australia 0.4.

30 October – 1 November 2026
Scorecard

(H) Tasmania	v	New South Wales
427 (119.1 overs); Bradley Hope 99 (182); Ben Dwarshuis 4/85 (22 overs)		202 (79.2 overs); Lachlan Shaw 45 (57); Jackson Bird 4/39 (15 overs)
		144 (50.2 overs) (f/o); Ben Dwarshuis 36 (60); Jackson Bird 3/26 (9 overs)

Tasmania won by an innings and 81 runs
Bellerive Oval, Hobart
Umpires: Eloise Sheridan and Michael Graham-Smith
Player of the match: Jake Doran (Tasmania)

- New South Wales won the toss and elected to field.
- Points: Tasmania 8.45, New South Wales 0.52.

31 October – 3 November 2026
Scorecard

Victoria	v	Queensland (H)
307 (90.4 overs); Campbell Kellaway 64 (156); Cameron Gannon 5/66 (22 overs)		280 (103.5 overs); Jack Clayton 104 (207); Matt Hennig 4/54 (17 overs)
173 (78.2 overs); Liam Blackford 36 (90); Jem Ryan 3/38 (14 overs)		3/75 (27 overs); Angus Lovell 27 (74); Mitchell Perry 3/15 (11 overs)

Match drawn
The Gabba, Brisbane
Umpires: Gerard Abood and Stephen Dionysius
Player of the match: Jack Clayton (Queensland)

- Queensland won the toss and elected to field.
- Matt Hennig (Vic) made his first-class debut.
- Points: Victoria 2.87, Queensland 2.73.

=== Round 4 ===
11–14 November 2026
Scorecard

(H) New South Wales	v	South Australia
204 (47.2 overs); Oliver Davies 70 (73); Jordan Buckingham 5/53 (14.2 overs)		325 (82.5 overs); Jake Weatherald 142 (171); Sean Abbott 3/42 (15 overs)
410 (118.5 overs); Sam Konstas 173 (272); Henry Thornton 4/47 (20.5 overs)		191 (57 overs); Jake Weatherald 38 (76); Jake Scott 4/30 (12 overs)

New South Wales won by 98 runs
Cricket Central, Sydney
Umpires: Claire Polosak and Michael Graham-Smith
Player of the match: Sam Konstas (New South Wales)

- New South Wales won the toss and elected to bat.
- Points: New South Wales 7.04, South Australia 2.25.

11–14 November 2026
Scorecard

(H) Victoria	v	Western Australia
5/402d (119.3 overs); Peter Handscomb 169* (323); Corey Rocchiccioli 2/70 (22 overs)		424 (158.5 overs); Corey Wasley 179* (337); Ashley Chandrasinghe 2/30 (5.5 overs)
1/109 (41 overs); Todd Murphy 63 (90); Ashton Agar 1/14 (10 overs)

Match drawn
Melbourne Cricket Ground, Melbourne
Umpires: Phillip Gillespie and Troy Penman
Player of the match: Corey Wasley (Western Australia)

- Victoria won the toss and elected to bat.
- Austin Anlezark (Victoria) made his first-class debut.
- Points: Victoria 2.5, Western Australia 1.92.

11–14 November 2026
Scorecard

(H) Queensland	v	Tasmania
348 (111.3 overs); Hugh Weibgen 89 (172); Riley Meredith 4/77 (25 overs)		133 (54.3 overs); Beau Webster 54 (104); Marnus Labuschagne 3/6 (4 overs)
0/19 (5.1 overs); Hugo Burdon 8* (18)		233 (97.2 overs) (f/o); Nikhil Chaudhary 63 (91); Tom Straker 4/33 (15 overs)

Queensland won by 10 wickets
The Gabba, Brisbane
Umpires: Parashar Joshi and Riki Wessels
Player of the match: Michael Neser (Queensland)

- Queensland won the toss and elected to bat.
- Points: Queensland 7.94, Tasmania 0.6.

=== Round 5 ===
22–25 November 2026
Scorecard

(H) New South Wales	v	Queensland

Sydney Cricket Ground, Sydney

23–26 November 2026
Scorecard

(H) Western Australia	v	Tasmania

Perth Stadium, Perth

24–27 November 2026
Scorecard

(H) South Australia	v	Victoria

Adelaide Oval, Adelaide

=== Round 6 ===
3–6 December 2026
Scorecard

(H) New South Wales	v	Western Australia

Sydney Cricket Ground, Sydney

3–6 December 2026
Scorecard

(H) Victoria	v	Queensland

Melbourne Cricket Ground, Melbourne

3–6 December 2026
Scorecard

(H) South Australia	v	Tasmania

Adelaide Oval, Adelaide

Mid-season break for 2026–27 Big Bash League season

=== Round 7 ===
8–11 February 2027 (D/N)
Scorecard

(H) Victoria	v	Tasmania

Melbourne Cricket Ground, Melbourne

8–11 February 2027 (D/N)
Scorecard

(H) Queensland	v	Western Australia

The Gabba, Brisbane

8–11 February 2027 (D/N)
Scorecard

(H) South Australia	v	New South Wales

Adelaide Oval, Adelaide

=== Round 8 ===
20–23 February 2027
Scorecard

(H) New South Wales	v	Victoria

Sydney Cricket Ground, Sydney

20–23 February 2027
Scorecard

(H) Tasmania	v	Queensland

Bellerive Oval, Hobart

20–23 February 2027
Scorecard

(H) Western Australia	v	South Australia

WACA Ground, Perth

=== Round 9 ===
2–5 March 2027
Scorecard

(H) Queensland	v	New South Wales

Allan Border Field, Brisbane

2–5 March 2027
Scorecard

(H) Tasmania	v	South Australia

Bellerive Oval, Hobart

2–5 March 2027
Scorecard

(H) Western Australia	v	Victoria

WACA Ground, Perth

=== Round 10 ===
14–17 March 2027
Scorecard

(H) Queensland	v	South Australia

Allan Border Field, Brisbane

14–17 March 2027
Scorecard

(H) Victoria	v	New South Wales

Junction Oval, Melbourne

14–17 March 2027
Scorecard

(H) Tasmania	v	Western Australia

Bellerive Oval, Hobart

== Final ==
25–29 March 2027
Scorecard

v

== See also ==
- 2026–27 One-Day Cup
