= Manly Warringah District Cricket Club =

- Nickname: Waratahs
- League: Sydney Grade Cricket

Personnel
- Captain: Jay Lenton
- Coach: Tim Cruickshank

Team information
- City: Manly, New South Wales, Australia
- Colours: Blue Maroon
- Founded: 1878
- Home ground: Manly Oval
- Capacity: 2,000
- Official website: Manly Cricket

Manly Warringah District Cricket Club is a cricket club in based in Manly, New South Wales, Australia who play in the Sydney Grade Cricket competition. Founded in 1878, Manly was a foundation club in the Sydney grade competition. Manly are relatively successful, having won the Club Championship 5 times since the year 2000. The current head coach is Tim Cruickshank and the first-grade captain Jay Lenton. Manly play their home games at Manly Oval. The club has produced a number of international cricketers, more recently Stephen O'Keefe, Stuart Clark and Michael Bevan, and all-time great Keith Miller. In 2019, Morne Morkel played a season at Manly in preparation for the Big Bash which he played for the Perth Scorchers and after he retired, he became Manly's Assistant Coach.. Current state representatives include Mickey Edwards, Jack Edwards, Stephen O'Keefe and Oliver Davies. Other first-class players include Ahillen Beadle and Jay Lenton. Media personalities including Cameron Merchant and Andrew Rochford currently also represent Manly-Warringah.

== Notable players ==
=== Current ===
Current players representing the Manly Warringah District Cricket Club who have played professional cricket include:

- Ahillen Beadle (Sydney Thunder)
- Adam Crosthwaite (Victoria, New South Wales, South Australia, Adelaide Strikers)
- Chris Green (New South Wales, Sydney Thunder, Guyana Amazon Warriors)
- Mickey Edwards (New South Wales, Sydney Sixers)
- Jack Edwards (New South Wales, Sydney Sixers)
- Jay Lenton (New South Wales, Sydney Thunder)
- Stephen O'Keefe (New South Wales, Sydney Sixers, Australia)
- Cameron Merchant (Northern Districts)
- Ben Bryant (Cambridge MCCU)
- Oliver Davies (New South Wales, Sydney Thunder)

=== International representatives ===
The following players have represented Manly Warringah District Cricket Club and Australia:

- Sammy Woods
- Percie Charlton
- Bert Hopkins
- Roy Minnett
- Jack Gregory
- Arthur Mailey
- Keith Miller
- Ron Saggers
- Jim Burke
- Gordon Rorke
- Peter Philpott
- Graeme Thomas
- Peter Toohey
- Kevin Wright
- Graeme Beard
- Michael Bevan
- Gavin Robertson
- Paul Wilson
- Stuart Clark
- Stephen O'Keefe
- Jack Edwards

The following players have represented Manly Warringah District Cricket Club and another national team:

- Bill Athey (England)
- Paul Jarvis (England)
- David Lawrence (England)
- Jason Gallian (England)
- Alvin Kallicharran (West Indies)
- Morne Morkel (South Africa)

=== Other notable players ===
- Andrew Rochford, television and radio presenter and doctor
- Cameron Merchant, former Northern Districts player and Married at First Sight contestant
- Mike Pawley OAM, former New South Wales player, local business owner and philanthropist

== See also ==
- Manly Marlins
