= Joe Colgan =

Australian cricketer (born 2004)

Personal information
- Full name: Joseph Grant Colgan
- Born: 24 May 2004 (age 22); Sydney, New South Wales, Australia
- Batting: Left-handed
- Role: Batter

Domestic team information
- Years: Team
- 2026/27–: New South Wales (squad no. 39)

Career statistics
Competition	LA
Matches	2
Runs scored	8
Batting average	4.00
100s/50s	0/0
Top score	7
Balls bowled	–
Wickets	–
Bowling average	–
5 wickets in innings	–
10 wickets in match	–
Best bowling	–
Catches/stumpings	3/–
- Source: Cricinfo, 18 October 2026

Joseph Grant Colgan (born 24 May 2004) is an Australian cricketer who plays for New South Wales in domestic cricket.

== Early life and Premier Cricket ==
Colgan joined the Mosman Junior Cricket Club in the North Shore Junior Cricket Association at the age of 13. He attended school at St Pius X College, Sydney, where he captained their first XI cricket side.

Colgan progressed to playing seniors for Mosman, making his First Grade debut during the 2021-21 season. He initially struggled to break into Mosman's first XI side, primarily playing for their second XI until breaking through during the 2025-26 season. At the end of the season, Colgan was awarded the O’Reilly Medal as the Men’s First Grade Player of the Year, after scoring two centuries from 19 innings at an average of 64.13.

== Domestic career ==
Colgan was invited to train with New South Wales ahead of the 2026-27 season. During the 2026-27 Dean Jones Trophy, Colgan was selected to make his List A debut against Victoria. He recorded 7 runs on debut before being dismissed by Scott Boland.
