= Richard Bennett =

Richard Bennet(t) may refer to:

== Academia ==
- Richard Bennett (historian) (1860–1937), Welsh author of 1940 in Wales#Arts and literature
- Richard E. Bennett (born 1946), religion professor

== Entertainment ==
- Rick Bennett (voice actor) (died 2019), played Juggernaut in X-Men: The Animated Series
- Richard Bennett (actor) (1870–1944), father of Constance Bennett and Joan Bennett
- Richard Bennett Lamas (born 1968), Uruguayan former comic book artist

== Music ==
- Richard Bennett (guitarist) (born 1951), Nashville based musician and record producer
- Richard Rodney Bennett (1936–2012), British composer

== Politics ==
- Richard Bennett (Virginia politician) (1609–1675), colonial governor of Virginia
- Richard Bennet (MP for Wycombe) (14th cent), represented Wycombe (UK Parliament constituency)
- Rick Bennett (Maine politician) (born 1963), politician from Maine
- R. B. Bennett (1870–1947), prime minister of Canada
- Richard D. Bennett (born 1947), U.S. federal judge
- Richard Bennett (Mississippi politician) (born 1957), Mississippi House of Representatives
- Richard Bennett (UN), United Nations special rapporteur on human rights in Afghanistan
- Richard Henry Alexander Bennet (senior) (1743–1814), British landowner and MP for Newport
- Richard Henry Alexander Bennet (junior) (1771?–1818), Royal Navy captain; MP for Launceston and Enniskillen

== Sports ==
- Richard Bennett (Australian cricketer) (born 1965), Australian cricketer
- Richard Bennett (English cricketer) (1872–1953), English cricketer
- Richard Bennett (New Zealand cricketer) (born 1954), New Zealand cricketer
- Richard Bennett (sailor) (1932–2011), Trinidad and Tobago sailor
- Dick Bennett (born 1943), American basketball coach
- Rick Bennett (born 1967), American retired ice hockey left winger
- Richie Bennett (born 1991), English footballer

== See also ==
- Bennett (disambiguation)
