= Hayden Schiller =

Personal information
- Born: 24 September 2006 (age 20)
- Batting: Right-handed
- Bowling: Right-arm medium-fast
- Role: Bowler

Domestic team information
- Years: Team
- 2026/27–: South Australia (squad no. 88)

Career statistics
Competition	LA
Matches	1
Runs scored	–
Batting average	–
100s/50s	–/–
Top score	–
Balls bowled	12
Wickets	2
Bowling average	5.00
5 wickets in innings	–
10 wickets in match	–
Best bowling	2/10
Catches/stumpings	–/–
- Source: CricInfo, 16 November 2026

Hayden Schiller (born 24 September 2006) is an Australian cricketer who represents South Australia in domestic cricket.

== Early life ==
Schiller grew up in Nuriootpa, South Australia. He attended school at Redeemer Lutheran School, Nuriootpa.

Schiller played junior cricket for the Greenock Cricket Club. He played Australian rules rootball for the Nuriootpa Rovers in the Barossa Light & Gawler Football Association.

== Domestic career ==
Schiller played junior cricket for South Australia, and South Australian Premier Cricket for the Northern Districts Cricket Club. In 2023, Schiller took a hat-trick against Tea Tree Gully to win the match for Northern Districts.

Ahead of the 2026–27 Australian cricket season, Schiller was added to South Australia's list as a rookie. He was selected to make his List A debut against New South Wales on 16 November.

== International career ==
Schiller represented the Australia Under-19s side at the 2026 Under-19 Men's Cricket World Cup. He recorded his best bowling innings of the World Cup against England, finishing as the pick of the Australian bowlers with figures of 2/31.
