= Aidan O'Connor (cricketer) =

Australian cricketer (born 2006)

- O'Connor in 2026

Personal information
- Full name: Aidan Patrick O'Connor
- Born: 13 July 2006 (age 20); Launceston, Tasmania, Australia
- Batting: Right-handed
- Bowling: Right-arm Medium-fast
- Role: All-rounder

Domestic team information
- Years: Team
- 2023/24-: Tasmania
- FC debut: 8 February 2025 Tasmania v Victoria
- LA debut: 5 February 2025 Tasmania v NSW

Career statistics
Competition	FC	LA	T20
Matches	5	6	1
Runs scored	103	63	-
Batting average	17.16	10.50	-
100s/50s	0/1	0/0	-
Top score	53	27	-
Balls bowled	468	231	12
Wickets	4	4	1
Bowling average	68.00	61.50	17.00
5 wickets in innings	0	0	0
10 wickets in match	0	0	0
Best bowling	1/6	2/47	1/17
Catches/stumpings	5/–	2/–	0/0
- Source: Cricinfo, 25 October 2026

Aidan Patrick O'Connor (born 13 July 2006) is an Australian cricketer who plays for Tasmania and Sydney Thunder. He is a right-handed batter and right-arm medium-pace bowler.

== Domestic career ==
O'Connor plays grade local cricket in Tasmania for Riverside Cricket Club in the NTCA (Northern Tasmania Cricket Association) and the Greater Northern Raiders in the CTPL (Cricket Tasmania Premier League). In 2023, he was awarded a rookie contract with Tasmania.

O'Connor made his One-Day Cup debut for Tasmania against New South Wales on 5 February 2025. He scored a half-century for Tasmania on his first-class debut in the Sheffield Shield on 8 February 2025 against Victoria, top-scoring in the Tasmania first innings with a score of 53.

In October 2025, he signed a two-year contract with Big Bash team Sydney Thunder. He made his debut against Sydney Sixers at the SCG on 16 January 2026.

== International career ==
In December 2023, O'Connor was selected as part of the Australia national under-19 cricket team that would go on to win the 2024 Under-19 Cricket World Cup in South Africa.

== Personal life ==
O'Connor is originally from George Town, Tasmania and first played cricket for Georgetown Cricket Club. He then transitioned to live in Launceston where he eventually started playing for Riverside Cricket Club in the NTCA and the Greater Northern Raiders in the CTPL. He attended Riverside High School before then heading to Launceston Church Grammar School.
