= Claude Tozer =

Australian cricketer (1890–1920)

Personal information
- Full name: Claude John Tozer
- Born: 27 September 1890; Sydney, Colony of New South Wales
- Died: 21 December 1920 (aged 30); Lindfield, New South Wales, Australia
- Batting: Right-handed
- Relatives: Percie Charlton (uncle)

Domestic team information
- Years: Team
- 1910/11–1919/20: New South Wales
- FC debut: 24 February 1911 New South Wales v South Africans
- Last FC: 3 December 1920 Australians v Marylebone Cricket Club

Career statistics
Competition	First-class
Matches	7
Runs scored	514
Batting average	46.72
100s/50s	1/5
Top score	103
Catches/stumpings	4/–
- Source: CricketArchive, 12 December 2008

Claude John Tozer DSO (27 September 1890 – 21 December 1920) was an Australian medical doctor and first-class cricketer who played for New South Wales. He was the nephew of Australian Test cricketer Percie Charlton.

== Early years and background ==
The son of a Bank of New South Wales official, John and Beatrice Tozer (née Charlton), he was educated at Sydney Church of England Grammar School. While at the school he was a member of the cadet corps, within which he attained the rank of cadet under officer.

He graduated from the University of Sydney with a Bachelor of Medicine in 1914. While at the university he played for the university's cricket club and was a member of their premiership winning team in 1913–14.

His uncle, Percie Charlton, played in two Tests, for Australia in England in 1890 and in 40 first class matches for New South Wales.

== Sporting career ==
A right-handed batsman, Tozer juggled his early cricket career with medical studies at university and as a resident at the Royal Hospital for Women, Paddington. Before the war, Tozer played four first-class matches for New South Wales as a middle order batsman.

In May 1915 he enlisted in the army with the rank of captain and was posted to the 1st Field Ambulance, Australian Army Medical Corps at Gallipoli. After the evacuation he was hospitalised in Egypt with paratyphoid in early 1916. Later in 1916 he served on the western front and was wounded severely in the head and right leg in July 1916 during the Battle of Pozières. Following an extended convalescence he returned to France in January 1917 and served in various capacities in hospitals and field units. He was promoted to the rank of Major in June 1917. In November 1917, he was mentioned in despatches by the commander of British forces, Field Marshal Sir Douglas Haig, for "distinguished and gallant service and devotion to duty in the field" and awarded the Distinguished Service Order.

Returning to Australia in early 1919, he resumed his duties with the state cricket team, this time as an opening batsman. In 1919/20 he played his fifth first-class match, against Queensland at Brisbane and made innings of 51 and 103. He also made his Sheffield Shield debut that season, at the SCG against South Australia and scored 37 in the first innings before being run out. Tozer was by now working as a general practitioner on Sydney's North Shore.

His prolific 1920–21 season in grade cricket, which saw him make 452 runs in three matches earned him selection for an Australian XI to play against the touring MCC. Opening the batting, he made a pair of half centuries.

== Death ==
Tozer was due to play as NSW captain in a match against Queensland on 1 January 1921, but on 21 December, at Lindfield in Sydney, he was shot three times and killed by a depressed married female patient who had fallen in love with him. At her trial, the woman, Dorothy Mort, was found not guilty on the ground of insanity but was imprisoned in Long Bay Gaol at the Governor's pleasure, and was released nine years later.

A non-fiction book describing the case, Mrs Mort's Madness, by Suzanne Falkiner, was published by Xoum in December 2014.

== See also ==
- List of cricketers who were murdered
