= Liam Blackford =

Australian cricketer

Personal information
- Full name: Liam Steven Blackford
- Born: 10 January 2004 (age 22)
- Batting: Left-handed
- Role: Wicket-keeper-batter

Domestic team information
- Years: Team
- 2023/24–: Victoria (squad no. 35)

Career statistics
Competition	FC	LA
Matches	2	4
Runs scored	145	243
Batting average	36.25	81.00
100s/50s	0/1	1/1
Top score	80	149*
Catches/stumpings	10/0	6/0
- Source: Cricinfo, 25 October 2026

Liam Steven Blackford (born 10 January 2004) is an Australian cricketer who has represented Victoria in domestic cricket.

== Early life ==
Blackford attended school at Geelong College, and represented them in APS cricket. He played local cricket for the North Geelong Cricket Club in the Geelong Cricket Association.

== Career ==
Blackford represented Victoria from Under 12s level. As a 15-year-old, Blackford played for the Cricket Australia XI at the national Under 19 Championships.

In December 2021, Blackford was selected as a reserve for Australia's Under-19 side ahead of the 2022 Under-19 Cricket World Cup. He represented Australia against England's Under-19 side in 2023.

Blackford was added to Victoria's state squad as a rookie ahead of the 2023-24 season. He missed the entire season after being diagnosed with thoracic outlet syndrome. Ahead of the 2024-25 season, Blackford was elevated to Victoria's senior list. He would not make his debut at state level, but returned to playing with the Geelong Cricket Club in Victorian Premier Cricket. In 2026, he joined The Hills Cricket Club in the Leinster Senior League in Ireland.

Blackford made his List A debut for Victoria in their first match of the 2026–27 Dean Jones Trophy against Queensland. He scored an unbeaten century on debut, finishing with 149 and winning the game for Victoria in the final over of the match.
