= Cameron Merchant =

New Zealand cricketer

Personal information
- Full name: Cameron James Merchant
- Born: 4 January 1984 (age 42); Sydney, New South Wales, Australia
- Batting: Left-handed
- Bowling: Right-arm off-break
- Role: Batsman

Domestic team information
- Years: Team
- 2007/08–2008/09: Northern Districts
- 2009/10–2010/11: Wellington

Career statistics
Competition	FC	LA	T20
Matches	26	12	8
Runs scored	1,445	270	144
Batting average	30.10	22.50	20.57
100s/50s	2/8	0/1	0/1
Top score	108	94	57
Balls bowled	24	–	–
Wickets	0	–	–
Bowling average	–	–	–
5 wickets in innings	–	–	–
10 wickets in match	–	–	–
Best bowling	–	–	–
Catches/stumpings	21/–	4/0	2/0
- Source: ESPNCricinfo, 29 January 2019

Cameron James Merchant (born 4 January 1984) is an Australian cricketer living in Sydney.

== Career ==
After a Second XI career in Australia, moved to New Zealand to play first class cricket for Northern Districts from 2007. A left-handed batsman and occasional right-arm off-break bowler, Merchant continually alternated between Northern Districts' First and Second XIs into the 2009 season. During his career, he has scored more than 1,000 runs in First and Second XI cricket, including two centuries and five half-centuries. He was formerly a professional at the Toronto Cricket Club in Canada.

Merchant is now the stand-in first grade captain of Manly Warringah District Cricket Club in Sydney Grade Cricket.

== Personal life ==
In 2019, he appeared on the Australian version of Married at First Sight, where he 'married' 36-year-old Jules Robinson in an episode originally aired on 28 January 2019. They legally married in November 2019, and their first child, Oliver Chase Merchant, was born on 3 October 2020.
