= Riverside Cricket Club (Tasmania) =

Cricket team representing Riverside

- Riverside Blues
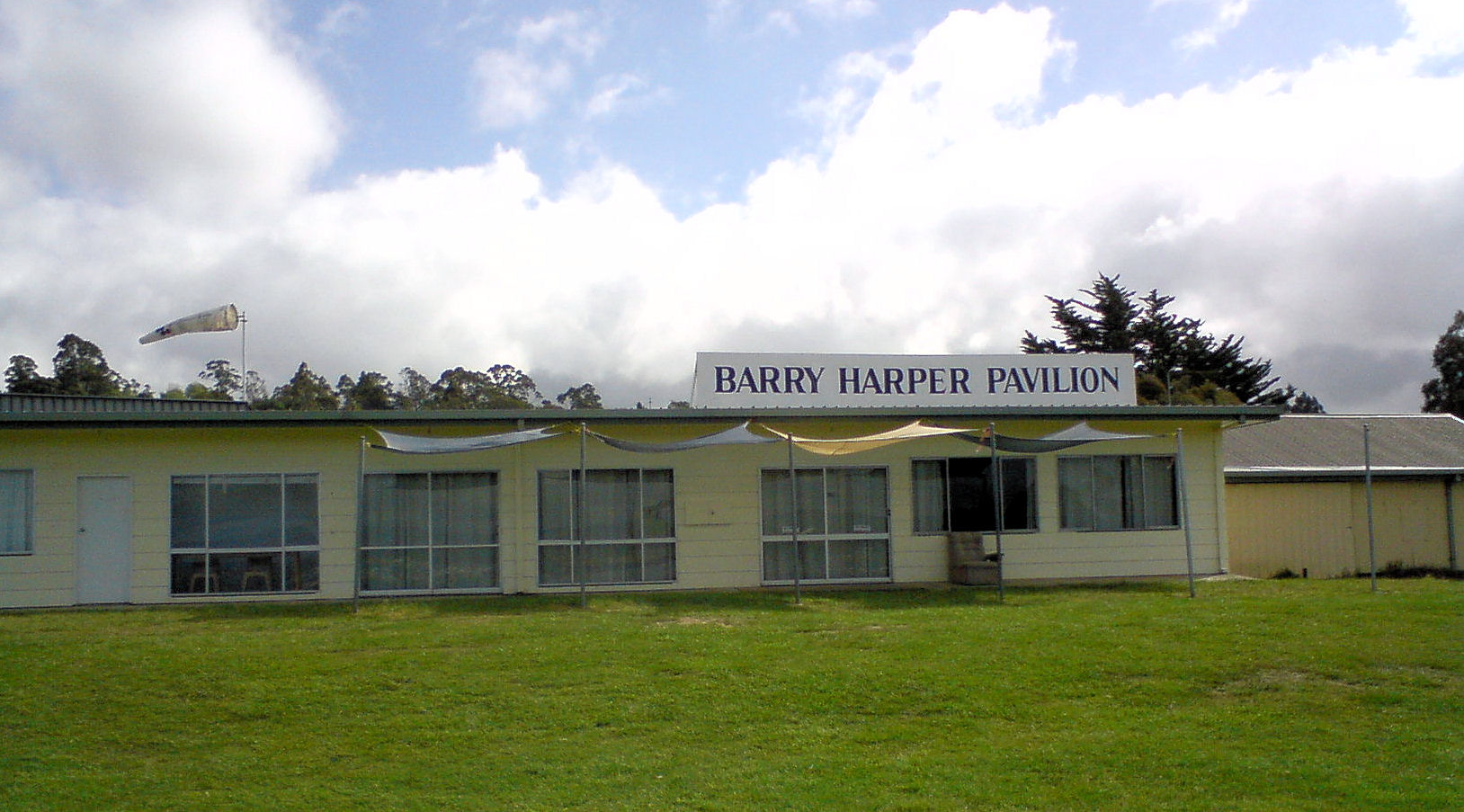

Personnel
- Captain: Peter New
- Coach: Patrick Mackrell

Team information
- Founded: 1948
- Home ground: Windsor Park
- Official website: http://riversidecc.tas.cricket.com.au

Riverside Cricket Club (RCC) is a cricket team formed in 1948 as a club in the western side of the Tamar Valley near Launceston. The club plays in the Northern Tasmanian Cricket Association grade cricket competition, in the Australian state of Tasmania.

The club is based in the West Tamar Council's Windsor Park precinct and has access to three cricket grounds, two of these are used as junior grounds and are concrete with a synthetic covering and the third is a turf wicket that is used by the senior club and at times representative teams including the Greater Northern Raiders.

== Teams and Honours ==
The Riverside Cricket Club has junior teams in the Northern Tasmanian Cricket league as well as 4 senior men's grade teams and 1 ladies' team. Riverside has won four A-grade NTCA Premierships in; 1968–69, 1976–77, 1977–78, 1980–81. During 1980-81 Riverside was the first club to win all three grade titles in Tasmanian history.

== Notable players ==
Richard Hadlee played six games for the club scoring 53 runs. He took taking 22 wickets in 86.4 overs at an average of 7.75 with an economy rate of 1.92. Steve Howard was a star batsmen during the Club's successful era in the late 1970s and early 1980s. He was a regular selection for Tasmania in the inaugural season of Shield cricket. Tony Benneworth was a medium pace swing bowler and hard hitting middle order bat. Another who contributed to the Club's successful era in the late 1970s and early 1980s. He was also a regular selection for Tasmania during the early years of the Sheffield Shield. Also, starred in Tasmania's inaugural one-day cup campaigns, particularly in the win against West Australia in 1979 at the TCA ground in Hobart.

Riverside Cricket Club is the club of origin for Tasmania Tigers WNCL and Hobart Hurricanes WBBL batter Emma Manix-Geeves, who is a product of Riverside's junior program. Manix-Geeves went on to represent Riverside in both the male and female senior first grade teams and the Greater Northern Raiders in the Cricket Tasmania Premier League (CTPL).

Over the 2021/22 CTPL season, Manix-Geeves scored a total of 682 runs at an average of 68.20 with 1 century and 6 half centuries. To top off her stellar season with the bat, Manix-Geeves also played an important role in the Tasmanian Tigers WNCL grand final triumph over South Australia, scoring an unbeaten 104 alongside Ellyse Villani (111*). This effort, along with her overall consistency with the bat, saw Manix-Geeves awarded the Cricket Tasmania Female Young Player of the Year award for season 2021/22.

== Gallery ==
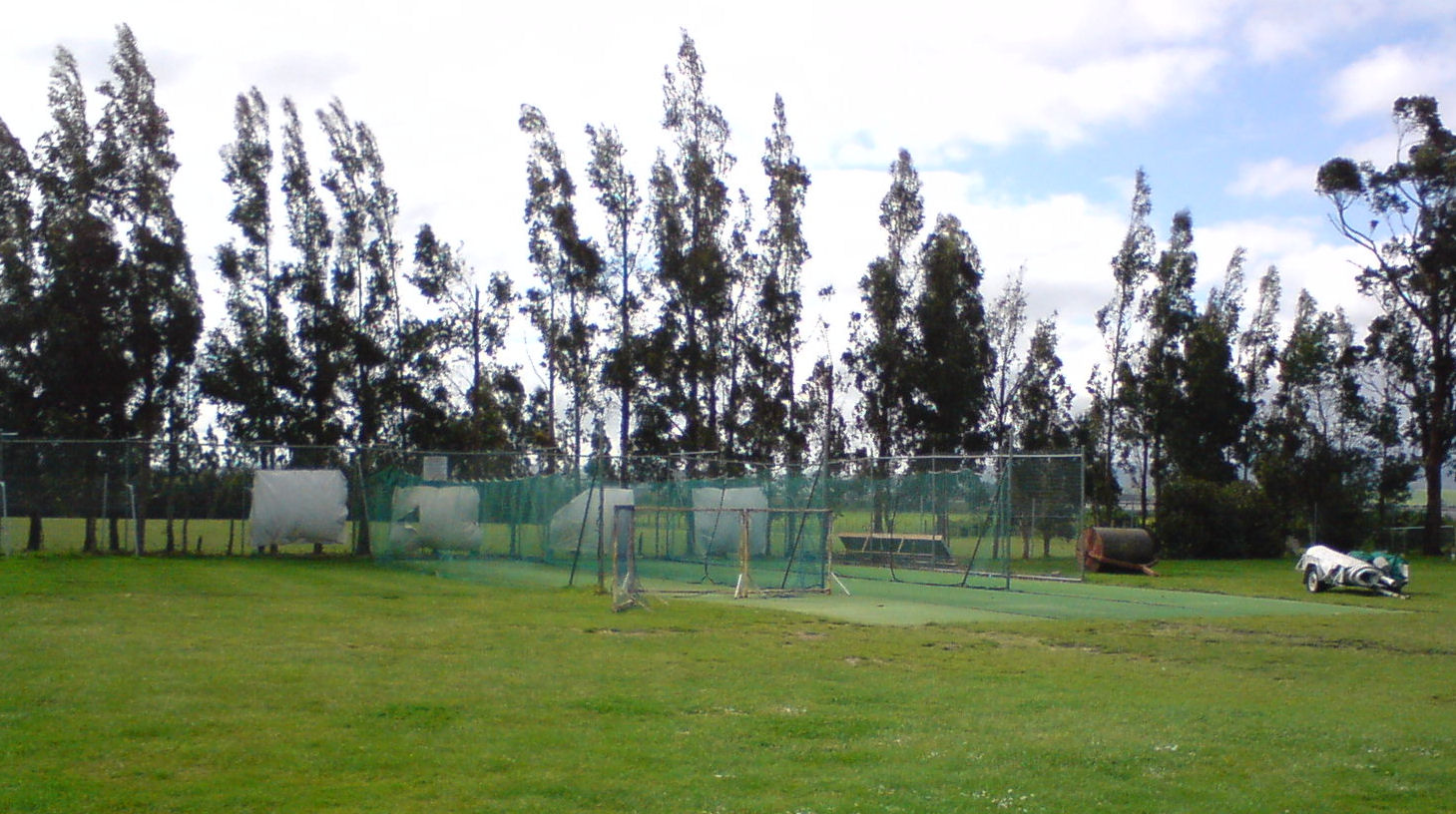
Club Training Nets

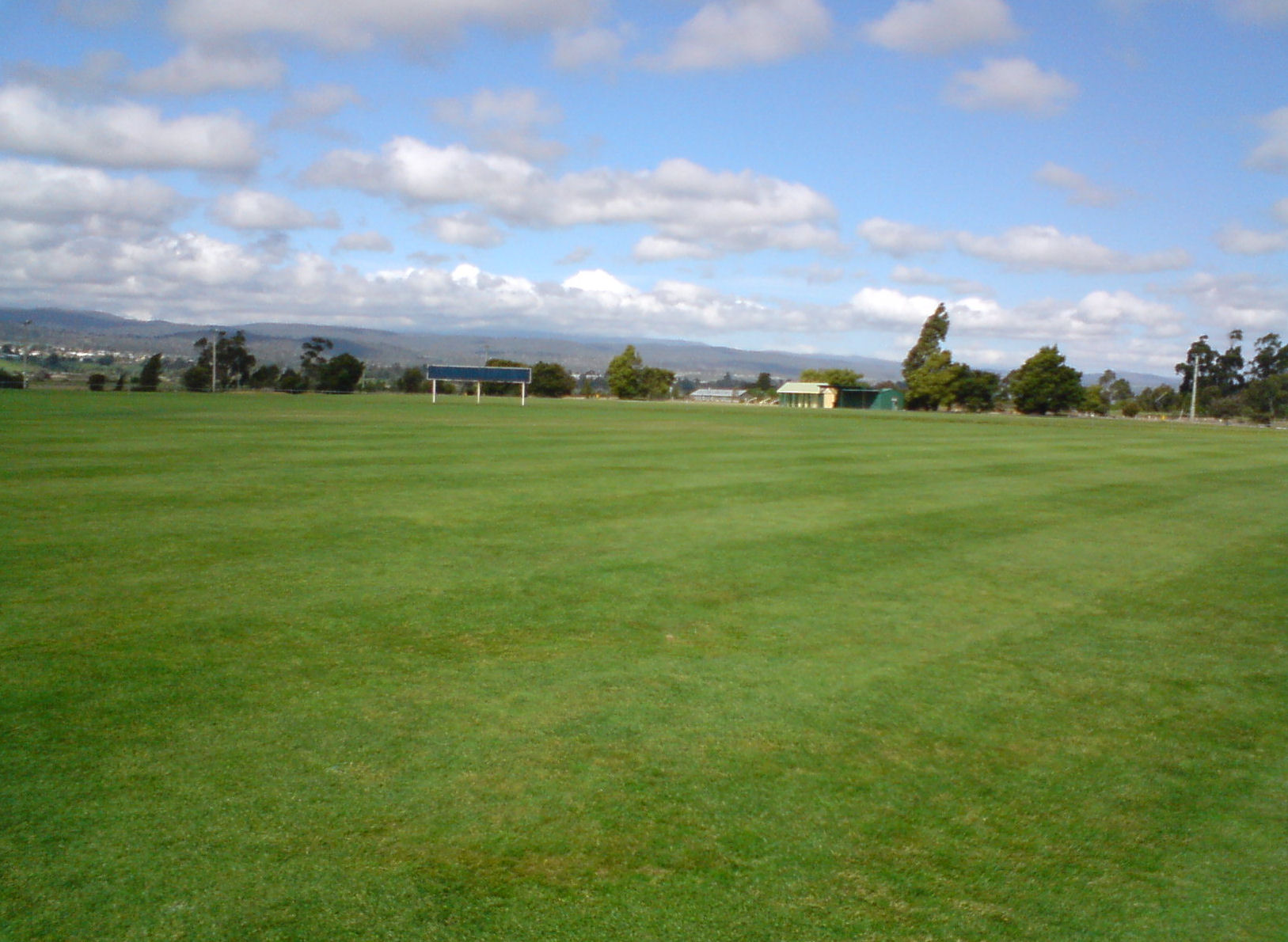
Main Oval in foreground with Oval 2 in background

== See also ==
- Cricket Tasmania
