= 2026–27 Australian cricket season =

Sheffield Shield
- Champions: –

Dean Jones Trophy
- Champions: –

BBL
- Champions: –

WNCL
- Champions: –

WBBL
- Champions: –

The 2026–27 Australian cricket season commenced on 18 September 2026 and will finish on 30 March 2027.

It is the 125th season in which the Sheffield Shield has been an official competition and featured First-Class, List A, and Twenty20 cricket competitions across Australia.

The principal men's domestic competitions are the Sheffield Shield, Marsh One-Day Cup and Big Bash League, while the women's domestic season includes the Women's National Cricket League and Women's Big Bash League.

== International tours ==
=== Bangladesh men's tour ===
In August, Bangladesh toured Australia to play two Test matches which formed part of the 2025–2027 World Test Championship. The matches were played in Darwin and Mackay, with the series marking the return of Test cricket to Darwin after 22 years and the first Test at Mackay's Great Barrier Reef Arena.

=== Bangladesh women's tour ===
In October, Bangladesh women's team will tour Australia to play three WODI and three WT20I matches. The WODI series will be played at Allan Border Field in Brisbane, while the WT20I series will be played at North Sydney Oval.

=== England men's tour ===
In November, England will tour Australia to play three ODI and five T20I matches. The ODI series will be played in Perth, Adelaide and Hobart, while the T20I series will be played in Melbourne, the Gold Coast, Brisbane, Sydney and Canberra.

=== New Zealand men's tour ===
From December to January, New Zealand will tour Australia to play four Test matches, which form part of the 2025–2027 World Test Championship. The series will be played in Perth, Adelaide, Melbourne and Sydney.

=== New Zealand women's tour ===
In October, New Zealand women's team will tour Australia to play three WT20I matches. The White Ferns will return to Australia in March to play three WODI matches.

=== 150th Anniversary Test ===
In March, Australia will play England in a one-off Test match at the Melbourne Cricket Ground to commemorate the 150th anniversary of the first Test match. The match is scheduled to take place from 11 to 15 March 2027.

== Domestic cricket ==
=== Sheffield Shield ===
The Sheffield Shield began on 7 October and will finish with the final beginning on 25 March, with the six state teams competing in a round-robin competition. Each team will play ten fixtures during the regular season.

=== One-Day Cup ===
The One-Day Cup will run from 18 September to 14 February with the six state teams competing in a List A competition. The competition will be played in a round-robin format before the final.

=== Big Bash League ===
The Big Bash League will run during the Australian summer, with the eight teams competing in the Twenty20 competition. The regular season will be followed by a finals series to determine the BBL champions.

=== Women's National Cricket League ===
The Women's National Cricket League will run from 28 September to 20 March, with Australia's state and territory teams competing in a List A competition. The teams will compete in a round-robin competition before the finals.

=== Women's Big Bash League ===
The Women's Big Bash League will run during the Australian summer, with eight teams competing in the Twenty20 competition. The regular season will be followed by a finals series to determine the WBBL champions.

=== T20 Spring Challenge ===
The T20 Spring Challenge will take place during the 2026–27 season, providing a domestic Twenty20 competition for women's state and territory players before the Women's Big Bash League season.
