= Campbell Thompson =

Australian cricketer (born 2004)

Personal information
- Full name: Campbell Thompson
- Born: 18 January 2004 (age 22)
- Batting: Right Handed
- Bowling: Left-arm medium-fast

Domestic team information
- Years: Team
- 2025/26: South Australia (squad no. 10)

Career statistics
Competition	FC	LA
Matches	1	3
Runs scored	0	–
Batting average	0	–
100s/50s	–/–	–
Top score	0*	–
Balls bowled	126	118
Wickets	3	2
Bowling average	14.66	46.00
5 wickets in innings	0	0
10 wickets in match	0	0
Best bowling	2/16	1/3
Catches/stumpings	1/–	0/–
- Source: ESPNcricinfo, 18 October 2026

Campbell Thompson (born 18 January 2004) is an Australian cricketer, who is a left-arm medium-fast. He plays for South Australia cricket team in domestic cricket.

== Domestic career ==
He made his List A cricket debut for South Australia against New South Wales on 10 February 2026 in the 2025–26 One-Day Cup. He made his first-class cricket debut for South Australia against Queensland on 16 February 2026 in the 2025–26 Sheffield Shield season.

In August 2026, Thompson played for the Cricket Australia XI against the visiting Bangladesh team, taking eight wickets in the second innings to win the match for Australia.
