= Matt Hennig =

Personal information
- Full name: Matthew Hennig
- Born: 17 August 1998 (age 28)
- Nickname: Chook
- Batting: Right-handed
- Bowling: Right-arm fast
- Role: Bowler

Domestic team information
- Years: Team
- 2026/27–: Victoria (squad no. 11)
- 2026/27–: Melbourne Renegades (squad no. 11)

Career statistics
Competition	FC	LA
Matches	1	2
Runs scored	8	15
Batting average	8.00	–
100s/50s	0/0	0/0
Top score	4*	15*
Balls bowled	126	90
Wickets	4	8
Bowling average	16.75	10.12
5 wickets in innings	0	1
10 wickets in match	0	0
Best bowling	4/54	6/46
Catches/stumpings	1/–	0/–
- Source: CricInfo, 19 November 2026

Matthew Hennig (born 17 August 1998) is an Australian cricketer who plays for Victoria and the Melbourne Renegades in domestic cricket.

== Career ==
Hennig played junior cricket for the Beaumaris Cricket Club. He represents the St Kilda Cricket Club in Victorian Premier Cricket.

During the 2026–27 Dean Jones Trophy, Hennig was selected by Victoria to make his List A debut against Tasmania. A week later, Hennig made his first-class debut against Queensland.

In his second List A match against Western Australia, Hennig took three wickets in an over twice, becoming the first player to do so in List A cricket. Following this feat, Hennig signed a one-year contract with the Melbourne Renegades.
