= Mark Wasley =

Australian cricketer (born 1965)

Personal information
- Full name: Mark Andrew Wasley
- Born: 6 October 1965 (age 61); Subiaco, Western Australia, Australia
- Batting: Left-handed
- Bowling: Right-arm fast-medium
- Relatives: Corey Wasley (son)

Domestic team information
- Years: Team
- 1994/95: Tasmania
- 1990/91: Western Australia

Career statistics
Competition	FC	LA
Matches	3	3
Runs scored	43	11
Batting average	10.75	–
100s/50s	0/0	0/0
Top score	20	10*
Balls bowled	629	102
Wickets	7	0
Bowling average	23.28	–
5 wickets in innings	0	–
10 wickets in match	0	–
Best bowling	3/88	–
Catches/stumpings	0/–	0/–
- Source: Cricinfo, 2 January 2011

Mark Andrew Wasley (born 6 October 1965) is a former Australian cricketer who played for Western Australia and Tasmania. He made his debut for the Warriors in 1991 against Victoria, but with constant injuries and a change of scenery saw him move to Tasmania for more chances. However, he was also frustrated there by the lack of opportunities. He is now involved with coaching the WACA Premier Cricket competition and is a well-known figure amongst cricket in Western Australia.
