= Jordan Quiggin =

Australian cricketer

Personal information
- Born: 24 December 2005 (age 20)
- Batting: Left-handed
- Bowling: Left-arm fast
- Role: Bowler

Domestic team information
- Years: Team
- 2025/26–present: Western Australia (squad no. 33)

Career statistics
Competition	LA
Matches	2
Runs scored	1
Batting average	-
100s/50s	0/0
Top score	1*
Balls bowled	72
Wickets	2
Bowling average	43.50
5 wickets in innings	0
10 wickets in match	0
Best bowling	1/28
Catches/stumpings	0/0
- Source: Cricinfo, 13 November 2026

Jordan Quiggin (born 24 December 2005) is an Australian cricketer who plays for Western Australia. He is a left-arm fast bowler.

== Career ==
In May 2025, Quiggin was awarded a rookie contract with Western Australia ahead of the 2025–26 season.

He failed to make his debut for WA in the 2025/26 season, but was named to play against Queensland in the 2026–27 Dean Jones Trophy.
