= Manly Oval =

Sports ground in Manly, New South Wales, Australia

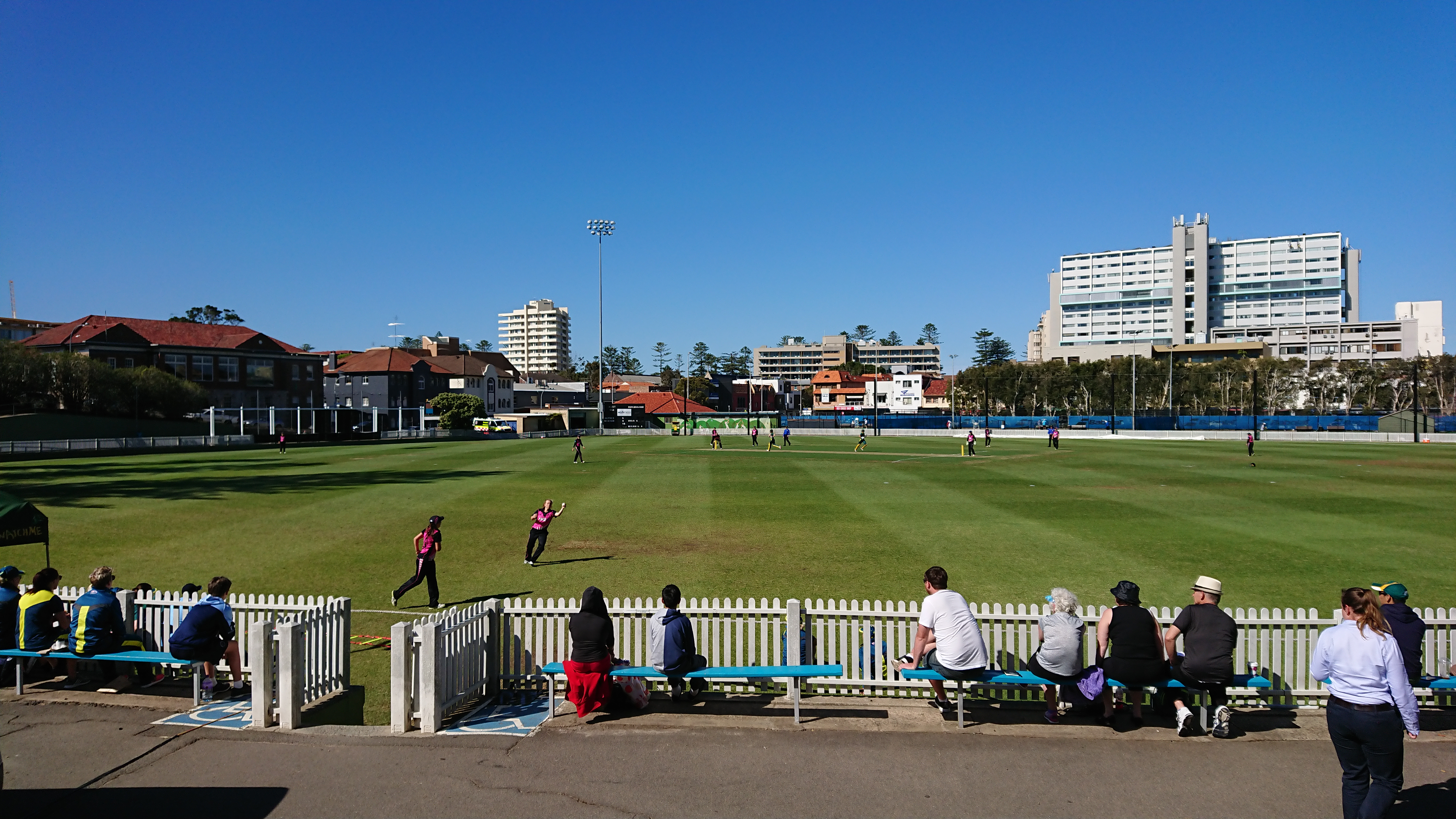
- Manly Oval women's international cricket match September 2018 Australia vs New Zealand
- Location: Manly, New South Wales, Australia
- Coordinates: 33.7960°S 151.2841°E
- Capacity: 5,000 (2,000 seats)
- Owner: Northern Beaches Council
- Tenants: Manly Warringah District Cricket Club, Manly Marlins

Manly Oval is a sporting ground located in Manly, New South Wales, Australia, primarily used for cricket and rugby union. The ground serves as the home ground for the Manly Marlins and Manly Warringah District Cricket Club. Manly Oval has also previously been used to host National Rugby Championship games as a home ground for the Sydney Rays. The ground primarily hosts Shute Shield and Sydney Grade Cricket matches.
