= Tim Cruickshank =

Australian cricketer (born 1982)

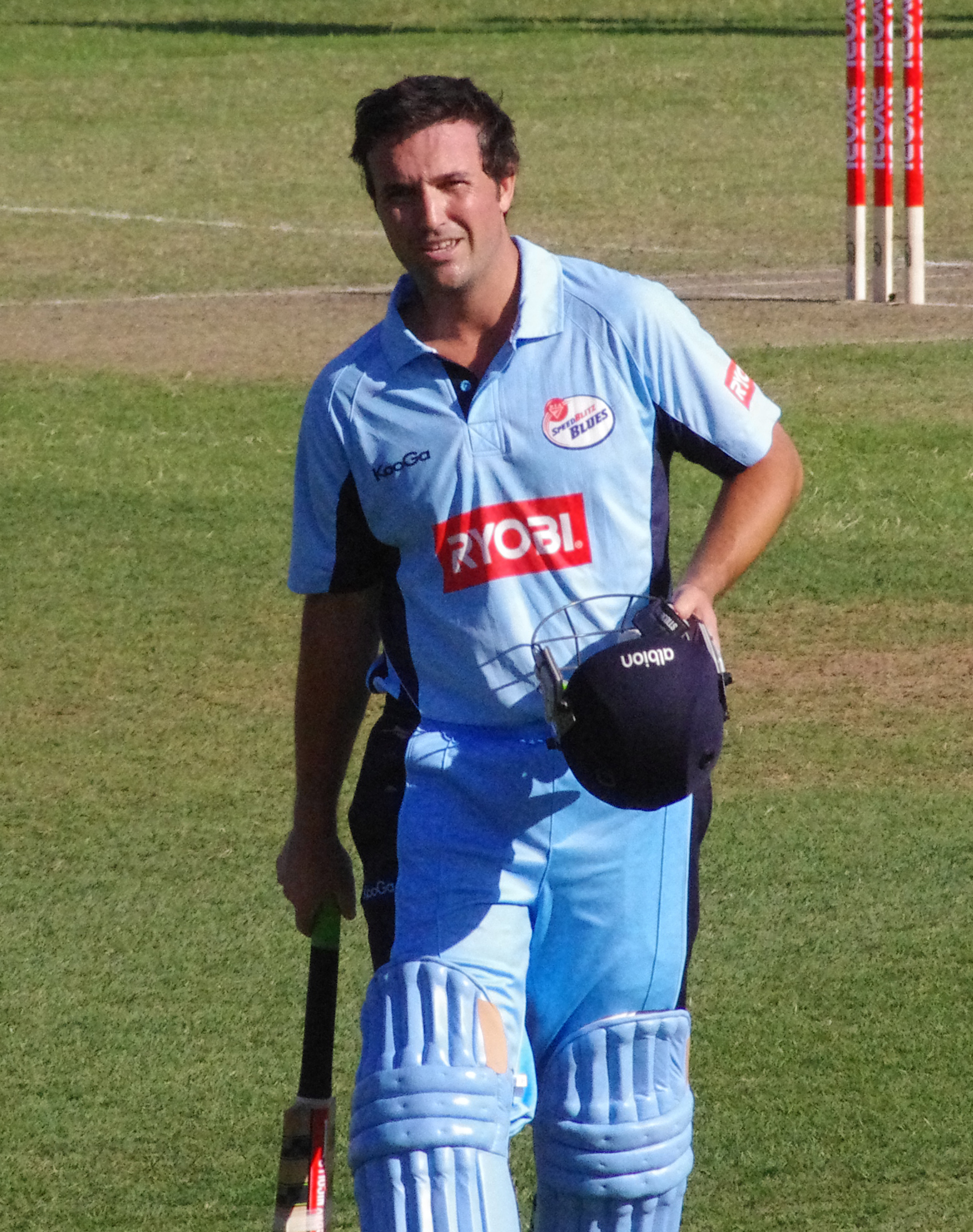

Personal information
- Full name: Timothy Dale Cruickshank
- Born: 19 May 1982 (age 44); Australia
- Nickname: Crooks
- Batting: Right-handed

Domestic team information
- Years: Team
- 2010–present: New South Wales
- 2011–present: Sydney Thunder

Career statistics
Competition	FC	LA	T20
Matches	4	5	3
Runs scored	191	116	17
Batting average	31.83	23.20	5.66
100s/50s	0/1	0/1	0/0
Top score	52	75	15
Catches/stumpings	4/–	1/–	0/–
- Source: Cricinfo, 24 March 2012

Timothy Dale Cruickshank (born 19 May 1982) is an Australian cricketer. He is a right hand batsman and rarely bowls. He is a regular in the Manly-Warringah Waratahs (a Sydney Grade Cricket club) and made his debut for New South Wales in the 2010/11 Ryobi One Day Cup - a provincial cricket tournament in Australia. In his debut against Queensland at the Brisbane Cricket Ground on 29 October 2010, Cruickshank made 8 off 16 balls. He signed with the Sydney Thunder in the newly formed Big Bash League, playing three games for the team. Cruickshank has also played for New South Wales second XI and the New South Wales under 17 and 19s.
