= 2026–27 Women's National Cricket League season =

Cricket tournament

Women's National Cricket League 2026–27 season
- Dates: 29 September 2026 – 20 March 2027
- Administrator: Cricket Australia
- Cricket format: 50-over Limited overs cricket
- Tournament format(s): Double round-robin and final
- Participants: 7
- Matches: 43
- Official website: cricket.com.au

The 2026–27 Women's National Cricket League season will be the 31st season of the Women's National Cricket League, the women's domestic limited overs cricket competition in Australia. The tournament ran from 29 September 2026 to 20 March 2027. Seven teams competed in a double round-robin tournament. Queensland are the defending champions.

== Ladder ==
Pos	Team	Pld	W	L	T	MA	Pts	NRR	Qualification
1	Australian Capital Territory	0	0	0	0	0	0	—	Advanced to the final
2	New South Wales	0	0	0	0	0	0	—	Advanced to the final
3	Queensland	0	0	0	0	0	0	—	
4	South Australia	0	0	0	0	0	0	—	
5	Tasmania	0	0	0	0	0	0	—	
6	Victoria	0	0	0	0	0	0	—	
7	Western Australia	0	0	0	0	0	0	—	

Updated to match(es) played on 29 September 2026. Source: Cricinfo
Rules for classification: The top two ranked teams will qualify for the final.
- Point system: 4 for a win, 2 each for a tie/no result/abandoned match, 0 for a loss
- Bonus point system: 1 for a win with a run rate 1.25 times that of the opposition

== Fixtures ==
29 September 2026
9:30
Scorecard

Queensland; 167 (38 overs)	v	New South Wales; 168/4 (25 overs)
Georgia Voll 83 (95); Samantha Bates 5/40 (10)		Phoebe Litchfield 68 (56); Kazuma Kato-Stafford 4/25 (5)

New South Wales won by 6 wickets
Cricket Central, Sydney
Umpires: C McGregor and Jeff Egan
Player of the match: Samantha Bates (New South Wales)

- Queensland won the toss and elected to bat.
- Points: New South Wales 5, Queensland 0

29 September 2026
14:00 (D/N)
Scorecard

South Australia; 290/7 (50 overs)	v	Victoria; 293/8 (49.3 overs)
Tahlia McGrath 154 (137); Annabel Sutherland 3/60 (10)		Annabel Sutherland 107 (96); Megan Schutt 2/49 (10)

Victoria won by 2 wickets
Junction Oval, Melbourne
Umpires: Ashfaq Ali and Clare Haysom
Player of the match: Annabel Sutherland (Victoria)

- South Australia won the toss and elected to bat.
- Points: Victoria 4, South Australia 0

29 September 2026
14:00 (D/N)
Scorecard

Tasmania; 232 (45 overs)	v	Western Australia; 236/6 (35.2 overs)
Tabatha Saville 79 (86); Ruby Strange 5/49 (8)		Beth Mooney 117* (94); Lauren Smith 3/37 (10)

Western Australia won by 4 wickets
WACA Ground, Perth
Umpires: Ashlee Gibbons and Lauren McGill
Player of the match: Beth Mooney (Western Australia)

- Tasmania won the toss and elected to bat.
- Points: Western Australia 5, Tasmania 0

1 October 2026
9:30
Scorecard

Queensland; 285/4 (50 overs)	v	New South Wales; 174 (38.5 overs)
Georgia Redmayne 139 (150); Samantha Bates 1/40 (10)		Lauren Cheatle 42 (40); Catherine White 3/44 (8)

Queensland won by 111 runs
Cricket Central, Sydney
Umpires: Jeff Egan and NW Warburton
Player of the match: Georgia Redmayne (Queensland)

- New South Wales won the toss and elected to field.
- Points: Queensland 5, New South Wales 0

1 October 2026
14:00 (D/N)
Scorecard

Victoria	v	South Australia

Match abandoned
Junction Oval, Melbourne

- No toss.
- No play was possible due to rain.
- Points: Victoria 2, South Australia 2

1 October 2026
14:00 (D/N)
Scorecard

Tasmania; 299/7 (50 overs)	v	Western Australia; 273/7 (50 overs)
Nicola Carey 87 (97); Ruby Strange 3/62 (9)		Mikayla Hinkley 60 (84); Courtney Grace Sippel 3/47 (10)

Tasmania won by 26 runs
WACA Ground, Perth
Umpires: Jarryd Buscall and Peta Merrilees
Player of the match: Nicola Carey (Tasmania)

- Western Australia won the toss and elected to field.
- Points: Tasmania 4, Western Australia 0

== Final ==
20 March 2027
14:00
Scorecard

v
