= Hugh Weibgen =

Australian cricketer (born 2004)

Personal information
- Full name: Hugh Desmond Weibgen
- Born: 28 October 2004 (age 22); Brisbane, Queensland, Australia
- Batting: Right-handed
- Bowling: Right arm off break
- Role: All-rounder

Domestic team information
- Years: Team
- 2023–: Queensland (squad no. 23)
- 2024/25: Sydney Thunder (squad no. 48)
- 2025/26–: Brisbane Heat (squad no. 23)

Career statistics
| Competition | FC | LA | T20 |
|---|---|---|---|
| Matches | 8 | 11 | 13 |
| Runs scored | 230 | 484 | 177 |
| Batting average | 15.33 | 53.77 | 19.66 |
| 100s/50s | 0/0 | 3/0 | 0/0 |
| Top score | 39 | 125 | 38* |
| Balls bowled | 36 | 111 | – |
| Wickets | 0 | 1 | – |
| Bowling average | – | 115.00 | – |
| 5 wickets in innings | – | 0 | – |
| 10 wickets in match | – | 0 | – |
| Best bowling | – | 1/6 | – |
| Catches/stumpings | 12/– | 5/– | 6/– |
- Source: ESPNcricinfo, 23 October 2026

Hugh Desmond Weibgen (born 28 October 2004) is an Australian cricketer who plays for Brisbane Heat in the Big Bash League and for Queensland in List A cricket. He is a right-handed batsman and right-arm off break bowler.

== Early life and education ==
Weibgen attended Brisbane Grammar School and played his junior cricket at Valley District Cricket Club.

== Career ==
Weibgen was named as part of the Queensland Bulls side for the 2023–2024 season on a rookie contract. Despite a back injury limiting his availability during the 2023–24 season, he was upgraded to a full-time contract with Queensland in April 2024.

In December 2024 Weibgen was selected by the Sydney Thunder as a local replacement player for the injured Tanveer Sangha. On 3 January 2025 he made his Big Bash League debut as a concussion substitute during the Thunder's match against the Perth Scorchers after Daniel Sams and Cameron Bancroft collided whilst attempting a catch.

Weibgen made his debut for Queensland at the start of the 2025–26 season, starting the season in the team for the One-Day Cup. In just his second match, Weibgen scored 115 not out off 94 balls to guide Queensland to victory over Western Australia, chasing 322 after having come out to bat with the score at 4/38.

Weibgen started the 2026-27 season strongly, making his second List A hundred in the second game of the One-Day Cup against New South Wales at Allan Border Field, making 125 off 89 balls. Weibgen was then named captain for the four-day Second XI match against Victoria the following week.

== International career ==
Weibgen captained the Australia national under-19 cricket team at the 2024 Under-19 Cricket World Cup in South Africa. During the tournament he scored a century against England U19 on 31 January 2024. His Australia U19 team won the tournament. Weibgen was selected for ESPNcricinfo's Team of the Tournament with an average of 50.66 and a strike rate of 83.

He acted as a substitute fielder on day five in the third Test between Australia and India in December 2024.

He was selected and played in the Prime Minister's XI in 2025 against the England Lions cricket team.
