= Lachlan Shaw (cricketer) =

Australian cricketer

Personal information
- Full name: Lachlan Darryl Shaw
- Born: 26 December 2002 (age 23)
- Batting: Right-handed
- Role: Middle-order batter

International information
- National side: Australia (2026–present)
- Only T20I (cap 120): 21 November 2026 v England

Domestic team information
- Years: Team
- 2024/25–: New South Wales (squad no. 11)
- 2024/25–: Sydney Sixers (squad no. 11)

Career statistics
Competition	T20I	FC	LA	T20
Matches	1	10	20	16
Runs scored	5	604	520	201
Batting average	5.00	33.55	30.58	22.33
100s/50s	0/0	0/5	0/2	0/0
Top score	5	68	80	33*
Catches/stumpings	2/–	9/–	23/–	10/–
- Source: Cricinfo, 21 November 2026

Lachlan Darryl Shaw (born 26 December 2002) is an Australian cricketer for New South Wales cricket team and Sydney Sixers. He is a right handed batsman and wicket keeper.

== Domestic career ==
He played club cricket for Sydney and then Northern Districts in the NSW Premier Cricket competition from 2020.

He was awarded a rookie contract by New South Wales cricket team in April 2024. He made his List A cricket and Sheffield Shield debuts for New South Wales against South Australia in November 2024. In December 2024, he signed for Sydney Sixers in the Big Bash League. He made his debut against Sydney Thunder on 21 December 2024.

Despite his youthful age and inexperience, Shaw was appointed as the captain of New South Wales in the One-Day Cup for the 2026-27 season.

== International career ==
He played for Australia U19 at the 2022 Under-19 Cricket World Cup, top-scoring for the side in the semi-final against India U19, hitting a half century from 66 balls.

Having played for Australia A on their 2026 tour of India, Shaw earned his maiden call-up in November 2026 for the T20I series of England's 2026–27 tour of Australia. He made his debut against England on 21 November 2026 at the MCG.

== Personal life ==
He attended The King's School, Parramatta.
