= Corey Wasley =

Australian cricketer (born 2005)

Personal information
- Full name: Corey Kenneth Wasley
- Born: 12 July 2005 (age 21)
- Batting: Left-handed
- Role: Batter
- Relatives: Mark Wasley (father)

Domestic team information
- Years: Team
- 2026–present: Western Australia (squad no. 29)
- FC debut: 19 October 2026 Western Australia v NSW
- LA debut: 24 October 2026 Western Australia v NSW

Career statistics
| Competition | FC | LA |
|---|---|---|
| Matches | 3 | 1 |
| Runs scored | 278 | 9 |
| Batting average | 139.00 | 9.00 |
| 100s/50s | 1/1 | 0/0 |
| Top score | 179* | 9 |
| Catches/stumpings | 0/0 | 1/0 |
- Source: Cricinfo, 13 November 2026

Corey Kenneth Wasley (born 12 July 2005) is an Australian cricketer who plays for Western Australia. A left-handed batsman, he made his First-class cricket and List-A cricket debut in October 2026 against New South Wales.

== Career ==
The son of former cricketer Mark Wasley, he played for Rockingham-Mandurah in Western Australian Grade Cricket. He joined Western Australia cricket team on a rookie contract ahead of the 2024-2025 season. Wasley scored 206 in a State Second XI game as an 18-year-old.

Wasley was a member of the Australia national under-19 cricket team that started the 2024 Under-19 Cricket World Cup in South Africa but having broken a finger in the opening match, he was replaced by Oliver Peake.

Wasley averaged 68.75 with the bat in the Western Australia Grade Cricket competition in the 2025-26 season.

Wasley made his first-class cricket debut for Western Australia agaikst NSW in the Sheffield Shield in October 2026, as an injury replacement for captain Aaron Hardie and scored 29 from 54 balls as Western Australia salvaged a draw with one wicket remaining. Two days later, Wasley made his List-A debut against the same team. The following month, he made his maiden Sheffield Shield century against Victoria with an unbeaten 179 at the MCG.
