= Geelong Cricket Association =

The Geelong Cricket Association is the main cricket organisation in the Geelong area. It is affiliate with Cricket Victoria. It currently has 37 teams competing in 4 divisions as well as junior competitions.

== History ==
The Geelong Cricket Association was first formed in 1896 with six foundation clubs Capulets, Clarendon, Geelong, Magpies, Non Descripts and Yarra Street Wesleyans. Also successful to begin with the competition began to struggle and was forced to disband in 1913.

In 1928 the Geelong Cricket Association was reformed with six new clubs Geelong City, Geelong Footballers, Geelong West, Newtown & Chilwell, North Geelong and South Geelong forming the new competition.

As of today the competition runs 4 divisions with 8 teams in each division. These 8 sides then play each other twice in the one day format and then once in the two day format, once home once away.

In the 2009/10 season the GCA also introduced a Twenty-20 competition spanning all divisions. North Geelong have currently won the last 2 seasons we have played.

The most successful GCA club has been Newtown & Chilwell who have won 20 Division One 1st XI premierships,theyre being closely followed by North Geelong who now have 17.

North Geelong are the current reigning Division 1 premiers, winning a record 7 premierships in a row. They have now taken over Newtown and Chillwell's 6 Premierships in the late 70s and early 80s. They will look to continue that record in 2026/27, whilst Newtown enter Division 2 for the first time on record.

== Affiliated Clubs ==
Division One	Division Two	Division Three	Division Four
East Belmont	Waurn Ponds	Bannockburn	Guild St. Marys
Grovedale	Bell Park	Corio	Modewarre
Lara	Bell Post Hill	Lethbridge	Manifold Heights
Highton	Geelong City	Marshall	Meredith
North Geelong	Geelong West	Little River	Newcomb & District
South Barwon	Newtown & Chilwell	Murgheboluc	St Albans Breakwater
St Joseph's	Leopold	Thomson	Teesdale
St. Peters	Torquay	Alexander Thomson	Surf Coast

In 2022/23 a new 4 Division Competition began with 8 sides in each Division.

== Premiers ==
	Division 1		Division 2		Division 3		Division 4		GCA T20	
Season	Premiers	Runners up	Premiers	Runners up	Premiers	Runners up	Premiers	Runners up	Premiers	Runners up
2025/26	North Geelong	East Belmont	Leopold	Highton	Waurn Ponds	Murgheboluc	Newcomb & District	Little River	North Geelong	Leopold
2024/25	North Geelong	Newtown & Chillwell	Lara	Murghebuloc	Thomson	Marshall	Lethbridge	Meredith	North Geelong	Lara
2023/24	North Geelong	East Belmont	St Peters	Torquay	Bell Park	Thomson	Lethbridge	Waurn Ponds-Deakin	North Geelong	Grovedale
2022/23	North Geelong	East Belmont	Murghebuloc	Torquay	Bell Park	St Albans	Waurn Ponds-Deakin	Guild St Marys	St Josephs	St Peters
2021/22	North Geelong	East Belmont	St Peters	Leopold	St Albans Breakwater	Corio			Not contested	
2020/21	North Geelong	East Belmont	Bell Post Hill	Geelong City	Corio	St Albans Breakwater			Not contested	
2019/20	North Geelong+	South Barwon	Bell Park+	Highton	Alexander Thomson+	Newcomb & District			East Belmont	Newtown & Chilwell
2018/19	East Belmont	Grovedale	Marshall	Torquay	Modewarre	Bannockburn			East Belmont	St Josephs
2017/18	East Belmont	North Geelong	Bell Park	Torquay	Thomson	Modewarre			Geelong City	Newtown & Chilwell
2016/17	Grovedale	St Josephs	Newcomb & District	Highton	Little River	Bannockburn			East Belmont	South Barwon
2015/16	Grovedale	East Belmont	St Albans Breakwater	St Peters	Shelford	Bannockburn			East Belmont	Leopold
2014/15	St Josephs	North Geelong	Marshall	Thomson	Teesdale	Meredith			East Belmont	Grovedale
2013/14	St Josephs	South Barwon	Bell Post Hill	Thomson	Shelford	Teesdale			Murgheboluc	East Belmont
2012/13	East Belmont	South Barwon	Newcomb & District	St Albans Breakwater	Bell Park	Meredith			East Belmont	Lara
2011/12	Grovedale	Geelong West	Geelong City	St Albans Breakwater	Lethbridge	Meredith			Lara	East Belmont
2010/11	Geelong West	Grovedale	St Albans Breakwater	Geelong City	Lethbridge	Bell Park			South Barwon	Newtown & Chilwell
2009/10	Lara	Geelong West	Thomson	Alexander Thomson	Modewarre	Teesdale			Grovedale	East Belmont
2008/09	Geelong West	Grovedale	North Shore	Thomson	Teesdale	Guild-St Marys				
2007/08	Grovedale	South Barwon	Waurn Ponds	Guild-St Marys						
2006/07	North Geelong	East Belmont	St Peters	Manifold Heights						
2005/06	East Belmont	Grovedale	Manifold Heights	Alexander Thomson						
2004/05	East Belmont	Geelong City								
2003/04	Grovedale	St Josephs								
2002/03	Bell Post Hill	St Josephs								
2001/02	Bell Post Hill	North Geelong								
2000/01	Newtown & Chilwell	Geelong City								
1999/2000	Newtown & Chilwell	Bell Post Hill								
1998/99	North Geelong	St Josephs								
1997/98	East Belmont	Geelong City								
1996/97	North Geelong	East Belmont								
1995/96	North Geelong	Leopold								
1994/95	Leopold	East Belmont								
1993/94	Leopold	North Geelong								
1992/93	East Belmont	St Josephs								
1991/92	Newtown & Chilwell	North Geelong								
1990/91	Geelong West	East Belmont								
1989/90	Newtown & Chilwell	East Belmont								
1988/89	St Josephs	North Geelong								
1987/88	Newtown & Chilwell	North Geelong								
1986/87	Thomson	Grovedale								
1985/86	Geelong City	Geelong West								
1984/85	East Belmont	Newtown & Chilwell								
1983/84	Newtown & Chilwell	Geelong West								
1982/83	Newtown & Chilwell	North Geelong								
1981/82	Newtown & Chilwell	Thomson								
1980/81	Newtown & Chilwell	Thomson								
1979/80	Newtown & Chilwell	G.W.C&F.C.								
1978/79	Newtown & Chilwell	South Barwon								
1977/78	East Belmont	Newtown & Chilwell								
1976/77	South Barwon	G.W.C.&F.C.								
1975/76	South Barwon*	Newtown & Chilwell								
1974/75	St Josephs	Geelong City								
1973/74	Newtown & Chilwell	South Barown								
1972/73	South Barwon	East Belmont								
1971/72	North Geelong	East Belmont								
1970/71	Corio	South Barwon								
1969/70	Leopold	Corio								
1968/69	South Barwon	Newtown & Chilwell								
1967/68	Leopold	G.W.C&F.C.								
1966/67	G.W.C&F.C.	Corio								
1965/66	Corio	South Barwon								
1964/65	G.W.C&F.C.	South Barwon								
1963/64	Corio	Geelong City								
1962/63	G.W.C&F.C.	Corio								
1961/62	South Barwon	G.W.C&F.C.								
1960/61	Newtown & Chilwell	Corio								
1959/60	Newtown & Chilwell	Geelong City								
1958/59	Newtown & Chilwell	Leopold								
1957/58	Corio	Leopold								
1956/57	G.W.C&F.C.	Corio								
1955/56	Newtown & Chilwell	G.W.C&F.C.								
1954/55	Geelong City	G.W.C&F.C.								
1953/54	Geelong City	Corio								
1952/53	G.W.C&F.C.	Geelong City								
1951/52	Geelong City	Newtown & Chilwell								
1950/51	Geelong West	CYMS								
1949/50	G.W.C&F.C.	High School East								
1948/49	Newtown & Chilwell*	Geelong West								
1947/48	Geelong West	Geelong Footballers								
1946/47	Geelong Footballers	Geelong West								
1945/46	G.W.C&F.C.*	Newtown & Chilwell								
1941/42	Ford Motor Company	Geelong West								
1940/41	Federal Mill	North Geelong								
1939/40	Geelong Footballers (B Grade)	Federal Mill								
1939/40	Ford Motor Company (A Grade)	Newtown & Chilwell								
1938/39	High School East*	Federal Mill								
1937/38	Geelong West	High School East								
1936/37	Federal Mill	Geelong Footballers								
1935/36	Newtown & Chilwell	Geelong Footballers								
1934/35	Newtown & Chilwell	East Geelong								
1933/34	Geel.West & Geel.Footballers									
1932/33	Geelong West	South Geelong								
1931/32	South Geel. & Geel.Footballers									
1930/31	South Geelong	North Geelong								
1929/30	North Geelong	Geelong City								
1928/29	Newtown & Chilwell	North Geelong								
1912/13	East Geelong# (Pre WW1)									
1911/12	East Geelong# (Pre WW1)									
1910/11	South Geelong# (Pre WW1)									
1909/10	Geelong B	Kardinia								
1908/09	Geelong B	Clarendon								
1907/08	Geelong B#									
1906/07	Geelong B#									
1905/06	Corio# (Pre WW1)									
1904/05	Geelong B#									
1903/04	Corio# (Pre WW1)									
1902/03	Clarendon#									
1901/02	Geelong B	Corio (Pre WW1)								
1900/01	Corio (Pre WW1)	Clarendon								
1899/1900	Geelong	Clarendon								
1898/99	Geelong#									
1897/98	Geelong	Non Descripts								
1896/97	Non Descripts	Geelong								

- # Most wins premiers.
- * No semis due to washouts
- + No finals due to Covid-19
