= Noah McFadyen =

Australian cricketer

- McFadyen in 2026

Personal information
- Born: 18 March 2003 (age 23)
- Batting: Left-Handed
- Bowling: Right-arm fast-medium
- Role: All-rounder

Domestic team information
- Years: Team
- 2026/27–present: South Australia (squad no. 16)

Career statistics
Competition	FC
Matches	1
Runs scored	134
Batting average	134.00
100s/50s	1/0
Top score	134
Balls bowled	184
Wickets	3
Bowling average	21.66
5 wickets in innings	0
10 wickets in match	0
Best bowling	2/35
Catches/stumpings	1/–
- Source: Cricinfo, 10 October 2026

Noah McFadyen (born 18 March 2003) is an Australian cricketer. He made his first-class debut for South Australia against Victoria on 7 October 2026 during the 2026–27 Sheffield Shield season. He scored 134 and took three wickets in the match. He had previously won the Bradman Medal twice in consecutive seasons for performances in South Australian Premier Cricket.
