= Kieran Elliott =

Australian cricketer

Personal information
- Full name: Kieran JS Elliott
- Born: 12 September 1995 (age 31)
- Batting: Right-handed
- Bowling: Right-arm medium-fast

Domestic team information
- Years: Team
- 2023/24–2025/26: Tasmania
- 2026/27–Present: Western Australia
- FC debut: 16 February 2024 Tasmania v Western Australia

Career statistics
Competition	FC	LA
Matches	15	3
Runs scored	379	68
Batting average	15.16	34.00
100s/50s	0/2	0/1
Top score	79	53*
Balls bowled	2,693	78
Wickets	50	3
Bowling average	29.74	33.33
5 wickets in innings	2	0
10 wickets in match	1	0
Best bowling	6/23	3/57
Catches/stumpings	4/–	1/–
- Source: ESPNcricinfo, 23 October 2026

Kieran Elliott (born 12 September 1995) is an Australian cricketer.

He made his first-class cricket debut for Tasmania against Western Australia on 16 February 2024.

In February 2025, he took his first five-wicket haul and ten-wicket haul in first-class cricket against Victoria.

Elliott moved to Western Australia ahead of the 2026-27 summer.
