= Percie Charlton =

Australian cricketer

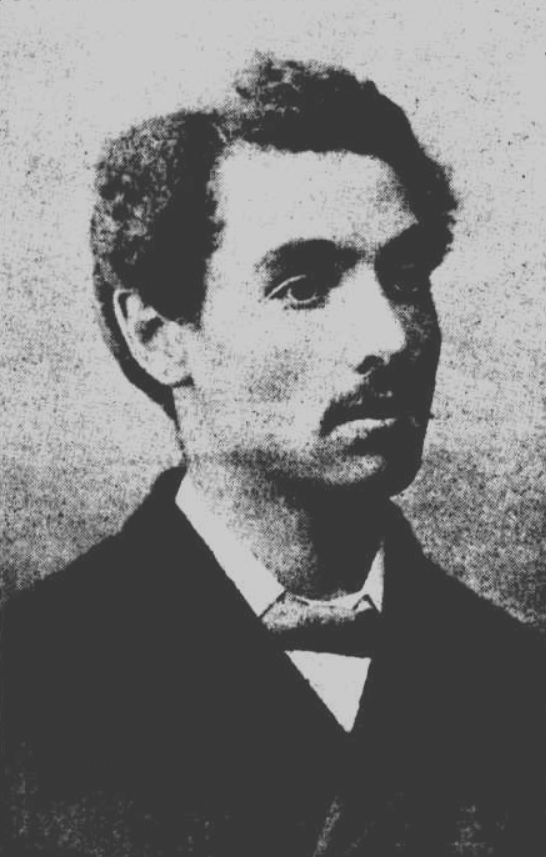

Personal information
- Full name: Percie Chater Charlton
- Born: 9 April 1867; Surry Hills, Sydney, Australia
- Died: 30 September 1954 (aged 87); Pymble, Sydney, Australia
- Batting: Right-handed
- Bowling: Right-arm fast-medium

International information
- National side: Australia
- Test debut (cap 57): 21 July 1890 v England
- Last Test: 11 August 1890 v England

Domestic team information
- Years: Team
- 1888/89-1897/98: New South Wales

Career statistics
Competition	Tests	First-class
Matches	2	40
Runs scored	29	648
Batting average	7.25	12.46
100s/50s	0/0	0/1
Top score	11	50
Balls bowled	45	5291
Wickets	3	97
Bowling average	8.00	19.96
5 wickets in innings	0	6
10 wickets in match	0	1
Best bowling	3/18	7/44
Catches/stumpings	0/0	39/0
- Source: Cricinfo

Percie Chater Charlton (9 April 1867 – 30 September 1954) was an Australian cricketer who played in two Tests in England in 1890 and played first-class cricket for New South Wales from 1888 to 1897.

== Cricket career ==
Charlton was regarded as an all-rounder, but he was more successful with his fast-medium bowling than with his batting. He was also an excellent slips fieldsman. A return of 7 for 44 against South Australia in February 1890 led to his selection in the Australian team to tour England later that year.

In his two Test matches in England, he didn't score many runs (6,2,10,11) but can claim the "honour" of being dismissed LBW to WG Grace in the second innings of the first test. Charlton didn't bowl in the first test, however in the first innings of the second he took 3 wickets for 18 runs off 6 overs. Unfortunately, he didn't get a decent opportunity to bowl as it seems in this early period of cricket both teams had a strong tendency to bowl their two top bowlers "into the ground". For example, Australia's two top bowlers in the second innings of the first test bowling 48 overs between them with only Charlton bowling the other 6. This was more the rule than the exception at least during this series.

He played cricket for many years for I Zingari, and served as the club's president from 1928 to 1947, and its patron from 1947 till his death in 1954. He was then made its patron in perpetuity.

== Life ==
Charlton went to school at Sydney Grammar School and became a highly qualified dentist, having graduated from the Harvard University School of Dental Medicine, studied at Edinburgh University and Glasgow University, and taught at the University of Sydney.

Charlton married Florence Bradford in the Sydney suburb of Neutral Bay on 15 May 1894. He was an uncle of the New South Wales state cricketer Claude Tozer, and also of the Olympic swimmer Boy Charlton.

== See also ==
- List of New South Wales representative cricketers
