= Jake Scott (cricketer) =

Australian cricketer

- Scott in 2026

Personal information
- Born: 10 January 2005 (age 21)
- Batting: Left-handed
- Bowling: Right-arm fast-medium
- Role: All-rounder

Domestic team information
- Years: Team
- 2025/26–: New South Wales (squad no. 44)
- 2025/26–: Sydney Sixers (squad no. 44)

Career statistics
Competition	FC	LA
Matches	4	3
Runs scored	154	127
Batting average	30.80	127.00
100s/50s	0/1	0/1
Top score	60*	52*
Balls bowled	585	101
Wickets	14	6
Bowling average	20.92	21.33
5 wickets in innings	1	0
10 wickets in match	0	0
Best bowling	5/35	3/48
Catches/stumpings	3/–	2/–
- Source: CricInfo, 17 November 2026

Jake Scott (born 10 January 2005) is an Australian cricketer who plays for New South Wales and the Sydney Sixers in domestic cricket.

== Early life ==
Scott attended primary school at Kooringal Public School. He attended secondary school at Kooringal High School.

Scott began playing cricket for the South Wagga Blues. As a 13-year-old, Scott made his debut for South Wagga's first grade side.

== Domestic career ==
In 2022, Scott represented the New South Wales Under 17s team at the National Championships. In November 2023, he was named the captain of New South Wales Country at the U19's Male National Championships.

In 2024, Scott had a strong season for Campbelltown-Camden in NSW Premier Cricket. He received a Basil Sellers Emerging Player Scholarship for his season, awarded to athletes that have the potential to earn a state-level contract.

Ahead of the 2025–26 season, Scott received a rookie contract with New South Wales. He was selected to make his List A debut against Queensland during the 2026–27 Dean Jones Trophy. On debut, he hit an unbeaten half-century, finishing with 52 not out from 39 balls.

During the 2025–26 Big Bash League season, Scott was added to the squad of the Sydney Sixers as a local replacement player. Ahead of the 2026–27 Big Bash League season, he signed his first full-year contract with the Sixers.

Scott made his First-class cricket debut for New South Wales in their first game of the 2026–27 Sheffield Shield season against Tasmania. In Tasmania's first batting innings, Scott took his maiden five-wicket haul, finishing with figures of 5/35.

== International career ==
In November 2025, Scott was named in the Cricket Australia XI to face the England Lions in a four-day game at Lilac Hill. In the match, Scott had bowling figures of 1/9 in his first bowling innings and 1/29 in the second. In his lone batting innings, Scott was dismissed by Matthew Potts for 2 runs from 19 balls.
