= Matthew Gilkes =

Australian cricketer (born 1999)

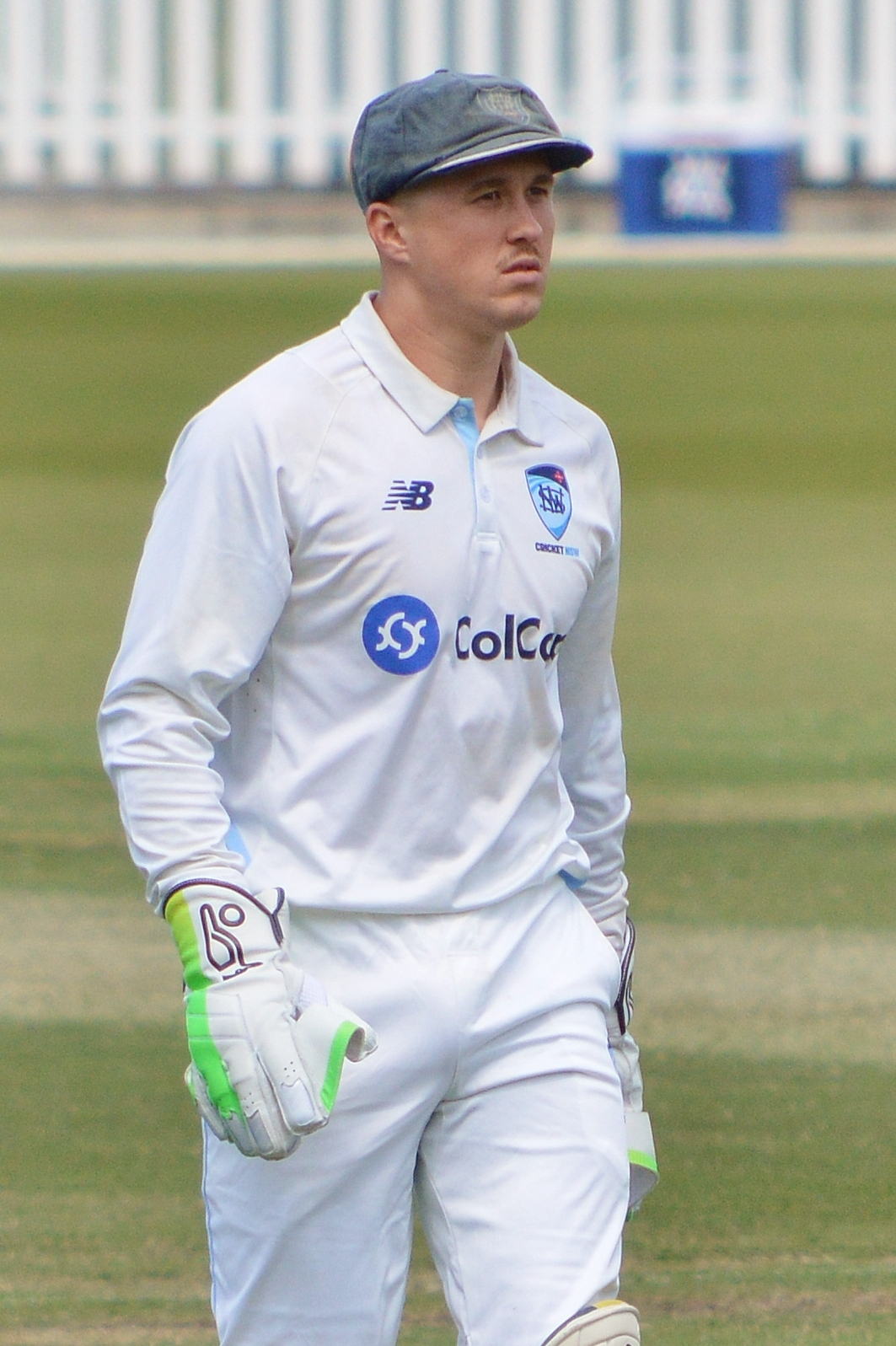
- Gilkes playing First Class cricket with New South Wales in October 2025

Personal information
- Full name: Matthew Robert Gilkes
- Born: 21 August 1999 (age 27); Ulladulla, New South Wales
- Batting: Left-handed
- Bowling: Right-arm medium
- Role: Wicket-keeper-batter

Domestic team information
- Years: Team
- 2018/19–: Sydney Thunder (squad no. 22)
- 2019/20–2025/26: New South Wales (squad no. 99)
- 2026/27–present: South Australia

Career statistics
Competition	FC	LA	T20
Matches	46	45	64
Runs scored	2,051	1,314	1,131
Batting average	26.98	34.57	20.19
100s/50s	0/19	1/6	0/6
Top score	94	127	93
Catches/stumpings	81/1	42/5	23/1
- Source: Cricinfo, 18 October 2026

Matthew Gilkes (born 21 August 1999) is an Australian cricketer who plays for South Australia, having previously played for New South Wales. He made his Twenty20 debut for the Sydney Thunder against the Perth Scorchers on 24 January 2019 during the 2018-19 Big Bash League season. He made his List A debut for New South Wales, on 30 September 2019, in the 2019–20 Marsh One-Day Cup. He made his first-class debut on 1 November 2019, for New South Wales in the 2019–20 Sheffield Shield season.

Gilkes left New South Wales to move to South Australia ahead of the 2026-27 season.
