= Richard Bennett (Australian cricketer) =

Australian cricketer (born 1965)

Personal information
- Born: 5 June 1965 (age 61); Launceston, Tasmania, Australia

Domestic team information
- Years: Team
- 1984-1992: Tasmania
- Source: Cricinfo, 20 March 2016

Richard Bennett (born 5 June 1965) is an Australian former cricketer. He played 35 first-class matches for Tasmania between 1984 and 1992. He was part of the group of northern Tasmanians who led the development of the first non-Hobart Premier League team in Tasmania; the Greater Northern Raiders.

== See also ==
- List of Tasmanian representative cricketers
