= Bryce Jackson =

Australian cricketer

- Jackson in 2026

Personal information
- Full name: Bryce Alic Jackson
- Born: 28 November 1999 (age 26); Albany, Western Australia
- Batting: Right-handed
- Bowling: Right-arm fast medium
- Role: Bowler

Domestic team information
- Years: Team
- 2023/24–2025/26: Western Australia
- 2026/27–present: New South Wales
- LA debut: 14 February 2024 Western Australia v Tasmania

Career statistics
Competition	FC	List A
Matches	1	15
Runs scored	8	24
Batting average	N/A	12.00
100s/50s	0/0	0/0
Top score	8*	8*
Balls bowled	210	803
Wickets	3	36
Bowling average	37.00	21.25
5 wickets in innings	0	1
10 wickets in match	0	0
Best bowling	3/36	6/31
Catches/stumpings	0/–	9/–
- Source: Cricinfo, 25 October 2026

Bryce Jackson (born 28 November 1999) is an Australian cricketer who plays for New South Wales, having previously represented Western Australia. He is a right-handed batsman and right-arm medium-fast bowler. He made his List A cricket debut on 14 February 2024 against Tasmania.

== Career ==
From Albany, Western Australia, Jackson was awarded a rookie contract with Western Australia cricket team ahead of the 2021–22 season. For the following season, he was awarded a full professional contract in May 2022. Although his progress as a cricketer was hampered by injury, he made his List A cricket debut for the side in February 2024, taking three wickets for 67 runs against Tasmania.

In December 2024 he was signed by Perth Scorchers for the Big Bash League.

Jackson was released by Western Australia at the end of the 2025/26 season, despite being the state's leading wicket-taker in the One-Day Cup. Jackson, however, secured a contract with New South Wales for the 2026-27 summer.
