= Greater Northern Raiders =

Tasmanian Premier League cricket team

- Founded: 2017
- League: Cricket Tasmania Premier League
- Home ground: York Park
- Colours: Orange/Black
- Affiliation: Cricket Tasmania

The Greater Northern Raiders are a set of cricket teams representing the Northern Tasmania Cricket Association (NTCA) and Cricket North West (CNW) in the Cricket Tasmania Premier League (CTPL). The Raiders form the only teams in the CTPL from outside of the greater Hobart area and the only teams without a formal club structure supporting the teams.

== History ==
In 2017, as a result of a review into the performance of Tasmanian representative cricket (the Hussey Review), Cricket Tasmania endorsed the creation of a men's team based in northern Tasmania to compete in the Cricket Tasmania Premier League (CTPL). This initiative aimed to address concerns that northern cricketers lacked the opportunity to compete in the highest level of domestic competition and the pool of cricketers being considered for State representative honours was being limited. Cricket Tasmania approached former State cricketer Richard Bennett to form a northern-based volunteer committee to develop and manage a men's first grade team that competed in the 2018/19 CTPL season.

The first season of the men's Raiders team was impacted by the historical low investment in training and playing facilities in the north by the state body and facilities' owners, a large playing roster causing frequent team changes, significant travel commitments for players, a lack of Tasmanian Tiger (State) representative players in their ranks, and limited support from some North Tasmania Cricket Association (NTCA) and Cricket North West (CNW) clubs who saw the Raiders as rivals. Despite these barriers, the Raiders achieved several match wins and the season was regarded as a success overall. As time progressed, a more focused playing squad began to form and the men's team won the T20 CTPL competition in the 2021-22 season in their third season of competition.

The Raiders management committee proposed the creation of a women's first grade CTPL team which was accepted by Cricket Tasmania for the 2019/20 season. Robert Stewart and Darren Simmonds were announced as the co-coaches of the women's team, which went on to win the Raiders' first championship. In the same season, the Raiders entered a team in the CTPL Vacation Cup, a short form Hobart junior competition, and fell short of a grand final place, losing to the eventual cup winners in their first season. The following season, the under-18s Raiders dominated the Vacation Cup and won the Grand Final. The Vacation Cup was cancelled in following seasons.

In 2023, Cricket Tasmania took over management of the GNR teams as a part of the State's high performance program, maintaining 1st Grade men's and women's teams in the CTPL plus a limited junior development program. The 2023-24 season saw the first 'home grown' Raider, Aidan O'Connor, to progress through the development program to the 1st Grade squad to receive a 'rookie' contract with Cricket Tasmania and achieve national representative honours with the Australian under-19 squad competing in the ICC Under-19 Men's Cricket World Cup in South Africa.

After the last round match in March 2024, when Cricket Tasmania reassessed competition points in the 2023-24 season, bonus points were removed for a Raiders win announced two months earlier. This resulted in the Raiders being removed from a preliminary final only a few days before that match, thereby ending the team's season.
