= Harry Hoekstra =

Australian cricketer (born 2006)

Personal information
- Born: 2 July 2006 (age 20)
- Batting: Right-handed
- Bowling: Left-arm fast-medium
- Role: Bowler

Domestic team information
- Years: Team
- 2026–present: Victoria
- LA debut: 19 September 2026 Victoria v Queensland

Career statistics
Competition	FC	LA
Matches	2	2
Runs scored	74	4
Batting average	18.50	4.00
100s/50s	0/0	0/0
Top score	45	2*
Balls bowled	393	95
Wickets	15	5
Bowling average	13.40	16.40
5 wickets in innings	2	1
10 wickets in match	0	0
Best bowling	6/103	5/42
Catches/stumpings	0/–	0/–
- Source: Cricinfo, 22 October 2026

Harry Hoekstra (born 2 July 2006) is an Australian cricketer who plays domestic cricket for Victoria. He is a left arm medium pace bowler and right-handed batsmen. He made his List-A cricket debut on 19 September 2026 against Queensland.

== Career ==
Hoekstra is from Leongatha, and played for Victorian Premier Cricket club Casey South Melbourne. He also played for Australia at under-19 level, his performances including dismissing Vaibhav Suryavanshi with his first ball against India U19 in a youth test in October 2024.

Hoekstra signed a professional contract ahead of the 2026-27 season with Victoria cricket team having worked prior to that in his family business. Hoekstra made his List-A cricket debut for Victoria on 19 September 2026 against Queensland. Hoekstra took his maiden five wicket haul in his second match a couple of days later, taking 5/42 against New South Wales at the Junction Oval. On 7 October, he made his first-class debut for Victoria against South Australia, taking figures of 6/103 in South Australia's innings.

== Style of play ==
A left-arm seam bowler, Hoekstra has been compared to Nathan Bracken due to his ability to bowl accurate balls that swing.
