= Marcus Bean (cricketer) =

Australian cricketer

Personal information
- Born: 5 January 2004 (age 22)
- Batting: Left-handed
- Bowling: Left-arm fast-medium

Domestic team information
- Years: Team
- 2024/25: Hobart Hurricanes
- 2025/26–: Tasmania

Career statistics
Competition	FC	List A	T20
Matches	2	1	2
Runs scored	7	-	1
Batting average	3.50	-	N/A
100s/50s	0/0	-	0/0
Top score	5	-	1*
Balls bowled	306	24	48
Wickets	10	0	2
Bowling average	20.50	-	38.50
5 wickets in innings	1	-	0
10 wickets in match	0	-	0
Best bowling	5/111	-	1/38
Catches/stumpings	0/–	1/–	0/–
- Source: Cricinfo, 23 October 2026

Marcus Bean (born 5 January 2004) is an Australian cricketer who plays for Tasmania in Australian domestic cricket and the Hobart Hurricanes in the Big Bash League. He is a left arm fast medium bowler.

== Career ==
He is a tall left-arm pace bowler. In December 2024, he signed for Hobart Hurricanes for the 2024-25 Big Bash League season having been scouted by Hurricanes Assistant Coach, James Hopes, playing in the Queensland Premier League for Northern Suburbs, and T20 cricket for Lindisfarne in the Cricket Tasmania Premier League. He made his debut on 16 January 2025 against Brisbane Heat, taking the wicket of Australian test batsman Nathan McSweeney with his second ball.
