= Austin Anlezark =

Australian cricketer

Personal information
- Born: 16 June 2005 (age 21)
- Batting: Left-handed
- Bowling: Right-arm fast-medium
- Role: Bowler

Domestic team information
- Years: Team
- 2025/26–present: Victoria (squad no. 41)

Career statistics
Competition	List A
Matches	8
Runs scored	10
Batting average	5.00
100s/50s	0/0
Top score	5*
Balls bowled	330
Wickets	10
Bowling average	31.50
5 wickets in innings	0
10 wickets in match	0
Best bowling	3/61
Catches/stumpings	1/–
- Source: Cricinfo, 25 October 2026

Austin Anlezark (born 16 June 2005) is an Australian cricketer who is a right-arm fast medium bowler and left-handed batsman. He plays for Victoria cricket team and Melbourne Stars.

== Career ==
From Briagolong, he played as a member of Boisdale-Briagolong Cricket Club in Victoria, and also played for Richmond Cricket Club.

He signed a rookie contract with Victoria cricket team in May 2024, having recovered from back injuries to finish the club season strongly. He subsequently signed with Melbourne Stars for the 2024–25 Big Bash League season in December 2024 and re-signed for the team ahead of the 2025-26 season.

Anlezark made his professional cricket debut for Victoria in a One-Day Cup fixture on 9 October 2025 against South Australia at the Adelaide Oval. Anzelark took 1/46 off 9 overs, taking the wicket of Nathan McAndrew on debut. He played his first home fixture the following week against New South Wales, talking two wickets in three balls.
