= Riley Kingsell =

Australian cricketer (born 2005)

Personal information
- Full name: Riley Kingsell
- Born: 26 September 2005 (age 21); Australia
- Batting: Right-handed
- Bowling: Right-arm medium
- Role: Batter
- Relatives: Sarah Ryan (Mother)

Domestic team information
- Years: Team
- 2025–present: New South Wales
- 2026–present: Sydney Sixers

Career statistics
| Competition | First-class | List A |
|---|---|---|
| Matches | 1 | 4 |
| Runs scored | 1 | 109 |
| Batting average | 1.00 | 27.25 |
| 100s/50s | 0/0 | 0/1 |
| Top score | 1 | 79 |
| Balls bowled | - | - |
| Wickets | - | - |
| Bowling average | - | - |
| 5 wickets in innings | - | - |
| 10 wickets in match | - | - |
| Best bowling | - | - |
| Catches/stumpings | 0/– | 3/– |
- Source: Cricinfo, 25 October 2026

Riley Kingsell (born 26 September 2005) is an Australian cricketer. He is a right-handed batter and right-arm medium bowler. He represents New South Wales in Australian domestic cricket and plays for the Sydney Sixers in the Big Bash League.

== Early life ==
Kingsell developed through the New South Wales cricket pathway and played for Bankstown District Cricket Club in NSW Premier Cricket. He was selected for the Australia Under-19 squad for the 2024 tour of India.

== Domestic career ==
Kingsell earned his first rookie contract with New South Wales for the 2025–26 season. He was listed alongside the Blues' other rookie players after progressing through Premier Cricket and the NSW pathway.

In May 2026, Kingsell was elevated from a rookie contract to a full contract with New South Wales for the 2026–27 season. Cricket NSW noted his progression through the state pathway, while Cricket Australia reported that he had become the youngest player to score a double-century in NSW first-grade cricket.

In September 2026, Kingsell signed his first Big Bash League contract with the Sydney Sixers on a one-year deal for BBL|16. He had previously been involved with the Sixers as a local replacement player.

At the start of the 2026-27 season, Kingsell made his debut in professional cricket in a One-Day Cup match against Queensland at Allan Border Field. Kingsell opened the batting and made 79 off 82 balls.

== Personal life ==
Kingsell's mother, Sarah Ryan, is a former Australian Olympic swimmer and a dual Olympic medallist who represented Australia at three Olympic Games.
