= Cricket Central =

Sports ground of Sydney, Australia

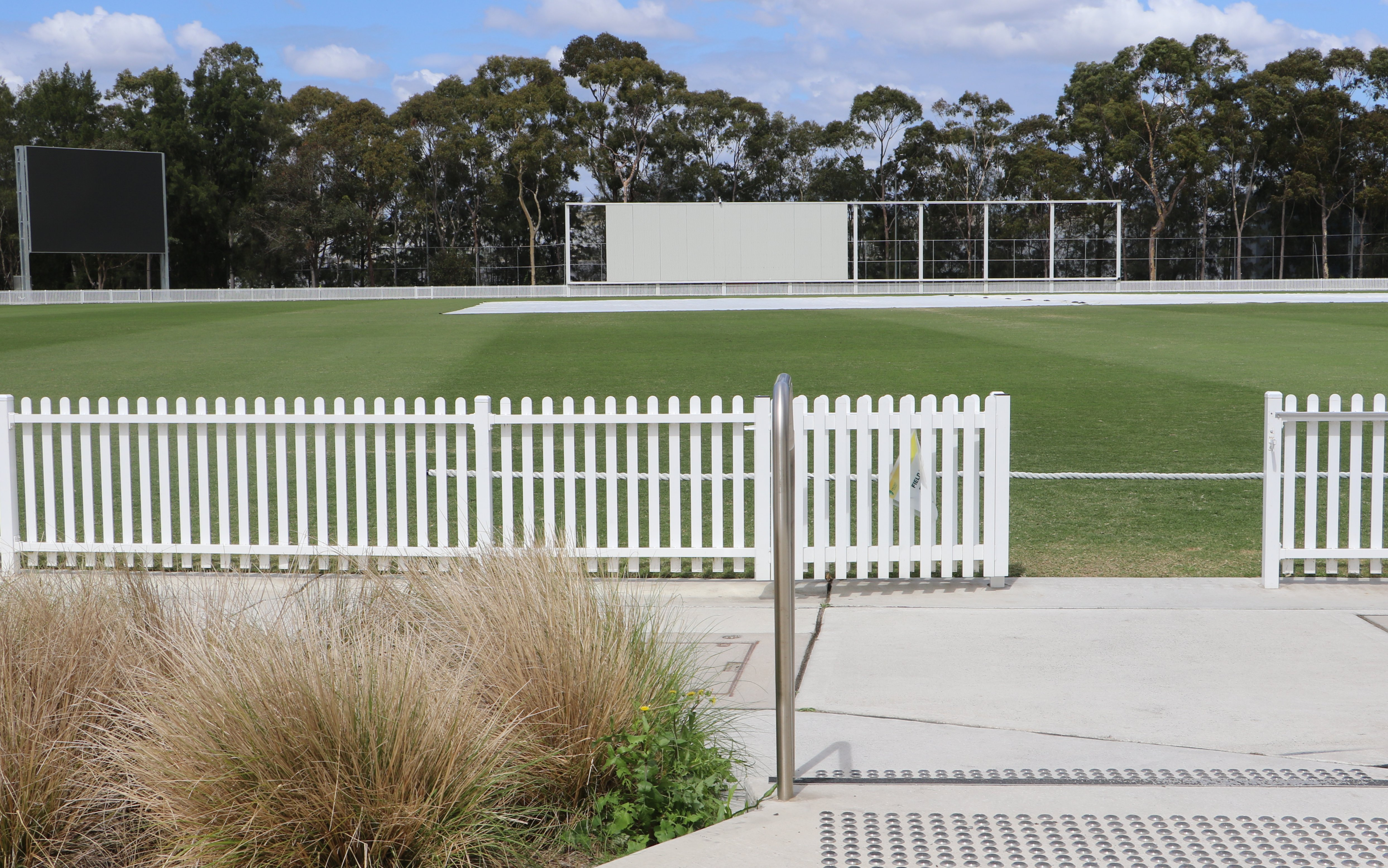
- Location: Greater Western Sydney
- Coordinates: 33.8268°S 151.0525°E
- Establishment: 2022
- Capacity: 3,000
- Operator: Cricket NSW
- Tenants: New South Wales

Cricket Central is a cricket ground located at far north-western corner of Wilson Park in Sydney Olympic Park. The ground has been used for domestic men's and women's cricket matches.

The stadium has a capacity of 3,000 people and opened in 2022.

== Development ==
The construction of Cricket Central Ground was part of a larger initiative to promote sports and recreational activities in the Olympic Park area. The project was funded with an investment of US$60 million, aimed at creating a facility that meets international standards for cricket.
