= Albert Esterhuysen =

Australian cricketer

Personal information
- Born: 18 August 2006 (age 20); South Africa
- Batting: Right-handed
- Bowling: Right-arm medium
- Role: Bowler

Domestic team information
- Years: Team
- 2025/26–present: Western Australia (squad no. 34)

Career statistics
Competition	FC	LA
Matches	3	9
Runs scored	4	23
Batting average	2.00	3.28
100s/50s	0/0	0/0
Top score	2*	11
Balls bowled	243	350
Wickets	12	10
Bowling average	15.75	35.80
5 wickets in innings	0	0
10 wickets in match	0	0
Best bowling	4/37	3/42
Catches/stumpings	2/0	5/–
- Source: Cricinfo, 25 October 2026

Albert Esterhuysen (born 18 August 2006) is an Australian cricketer who currently plays for Western Australia. He is a right-handed batsman and right-arm medium-fast bowler.

== Early life ==
Esterhuysen was born in South Africa, growing up in Pretoria before emigrating to Australia with his family at the age of 12. His role model is Morné Morkel. Esterhuysen represented Western Australia in the Under 19 National Championships. He also played for Rockingham-Mandurah in the 2024–25 season. He played second XI matches for Western Australia before his first-class debut.

== Career ==
In September 2025, Esterhuysen signed a professional contract with Western Australia ahead of the 2025–26 season. He made his List A debut on 24 September 2025 in the 2025–26 One-Day Cup. Esterhuysen took 3 wickets on his professional cricket debut. He took two wickets on his second game including Sam Konstas.
