= New South Wales cricket team =

Australian domestic cricket team

New South Wales

Personnel
- Captain: Nic Maddinson
- Coach: Brad Haddin

Team information
- Colours: Light blue Dark blue
- Founded: 1856; 170 years ago
- Home ground: Sydney Cricket Ground
- Capacity: 48,601
- Secondary home ground: Cricket Central
- Secondary ground capacity: 3,000

History
- First-class debut: Victoria in 1856 at Melbourne Cricket Ground
- Sheffield Shield wins: 47 (1896, 1897, 1900, 1902, 1903, 1904, 1905, 1906, 1907, 1909, 1911, 1912, 1914, 1920, 1921, 1923, 1926, 1929, 1932, 1933, 1938, 1940, 1949, 1950, 1952, 1954, 1955, 1956, 1957, 1958, 1959, 1960, 1961, 1962, 1965, 1966, 1983, 1985, 1986, 1990, 1993, 1994, 2003, 2005, 2008, 2014, 2020)
- One-Day Cup wins: 12 (1985, 1988, 1992, 1993, 1994, 2001, 2002, 2003, 2006, 2015, 2016, 2021)
- Twenty20 Big Bash wins: 1: 2008–09
- CLT20 wins: 1: 2009
First-class
One-day

The New South Wales cricket team (formerly nicknamed NSW Blues) are an Australian men's professional first class cricket team based in the Australian state of New South Wales. The team competes in the Australian first class cricket competition known as the Sheffield Shield and the limited overs One-Day Cup. The team previously played in the now defunct Twenty20, Big Bash, which has since been replaced by the Big Bash League since the 2011–12 season. New South Wales were the inaugural winners of the Champions League Twenty20.

They are the most successful domestic cricket side in Australia having won the First-class competition 47 times. In addition, they have also won the Australian domestic limited-overs cricket tournament cup 12 times. They occasionally play first-class matches against touring International sides. New South Wales have played teams representing nine of the twelve test playing nations. Besides its domestic successes, the state is also known for producing some of Australia's finest cricketers.

== Colours and badge ==
The primary club colour of New South Wales is sky blue, which represents the state colour of New South Wales. The secondary club colour is dark blue, with additional contrasting colours of white and red.

== Notable players ==
The following is a list of players who have represented Australia in Test Matches.

- Reginald Allen
- Tommy Andrews
- Alick Bannerman
- Charles Bannerman
- Warren Bardsley
- Sid Barnes
- Graeme Beard
- Richie Benaud
- John Benaud
- Murray Bennett
- Michael Bevan
- Jackson Bird
- Doug Bollinger
- George Bonnor
- Brian Booth
- Allan Border
- Nathan Bracken
- Don Bradman
- Bill Brown
- Jim Burke
- Fred Burton
- Sydney Callaway
- Hanson Carter
- Beau Casson
- Trevor Chappell
- Percie Charlton
- Arthur Chipperfield
- Stuart Clark
- Michael Clarke
- David Colley
- Herbie Collins
- Arthur Coningham
- Simon Cook
- Trent Copeland
- Grahame Corling
- John Cottam
- Tibby Cotter
- Ed Cowan
- Ian Craig
- Pat Crawford
- Pat Cummins
- Alan Davidson
- Ian Davis
- Jim de Courcy
- Harry Donnan
- Reggie Duff
- Greg Dyer
- John Dyson
- Ross Edwards
- Phil Emery
- Sid Emery
- Edwin Evans
- Alan Fairfax
- Jack Fingleton
- Bruce Francis
- Tom Garrett
- Dave Gilbert
- Adam Gilchrist
- Gary Gilmour
- John Gleeson
- Syd Gregory
- Jack Gregory
- Ned Gregory
- Dave Gregory
- Brad Haddin
- Roger Hartigan
- Neil Harvey
- Nathan Hauritz
- Josh Hazlewood
- Gerry Hazlitt
- Hunter Hendry
- Moises Henriques
- Andrew Hilditch
- Graeme Hole
- Bob Holland
- Bert Hopkins
- Ranji Hordern
- Bill Howell
- Phillip Hughes
- Bill Hunt
- Frank Iredale
- Archie Jackson
- Phil Jaques
- Sammy Jones
- Simon Katich
- Charlie Kelleway
- James Kelly
- Usman Khawaja
- Alan Kippax
- Sam Konstas
- Jason Krejza
- Geoff Lawson
- Brett Lee
- Ray Lindwall
- Hammy Love
- Nathan Lyon
- Stuart MacGill
- Charlie Macartney
- Nic Maddinson
- Arthur Mailey
- Alfred Marr
- Johnny Martin
- Hugh Massie
- Greg Matthews
- Stan McCabe
- Colin McCool
- Rick McCosker
- Percy McDonnell
- Glenn McGrath
- Tom McKibbin
- Keith Miller
- Roy Minnett
- Frank Misson
- Jack Moroney
- Arthur Morris
- Harry Moses
- Billy Murdoch
- Peter Nevill
- Matthew Nicholson
- Monty Noble
- Otto Nothling
- Steve O'Keefe
- Kerry O'Keeffe
- Norm O'Neill
- Bill O'Reilly
- Bert Oldfield
- Len Pascoe
- Kurtis Patterson
- Peter Philpott
- Roland Pope
- David Renneberg
- Steve Rixon
- Gavin Robertson
- Ray Robinson
- Gordon Rorke
- Ron Saggers
- Bob Simpson
- Michael Slater
- Steve Smith
- Fred Spofforth
- Mitchell Starc
- Brian Taber
- Peter Taylor
- Mark Taylor
- Johnny Taylor
- Grahame Thomas
- Nat Thomson
- Jeff Thomson
- Peter Toohey
- Ernie Toshack
- Victor Trumper
- Alan Turner
- Charlie Turner
- Doug Walters
- David Warner
- John Watkins
- Graeme Watson
- Bill Watson
- Shane Watson
- Mark Waugh
- Steve Waugh
- Dirk Wellham
- Mike Whitney

The following is a list of players who have represented other nations in Test matches.

- Mason Crane (England)
- Imran Khan (Pakistan)
- Andy Roberts (West Indies)
- Will Somerville (New Zealand)

== Honours ==
- Sheffield Shield Champions: 47

1895–96, 1896–97, 1899–1900, 1901–02, 1902–03, 1903–04, 1904–05, 1905–06, 1906–07, 1908–09, 1910–11, 1911–12, 1913–14, 1919–20, 1920–21, 1922–23, 1925–26, 1928–29, 1931–32, 1932–33, 1937–38, 1939–40, 1948–49, 1949–50, 1951–52, 1953–54, 1954–55, 1955–56, 1956–57, 1957–58, 1958–59, 1959–60, 1960–61, 1961–62, 1964–65, 1965–66, 1982–83, 1984–85, 1985–86, 1989–90, 1992–93, 1993–94, 2002–03, 2004–05, 2007–08, 2013–14, 2019–20

- Sheffield Shield Runner-up (since introduction of final in 1982–83): 4

1990–91, 1991–92, 2006–07, 2018–19

- Domestic One-Day Cup Champions: 12

1984–85, 1987–88, 1991–92, 1992–93, 1993–94, 2000–01, 2001–02, 2002–03, 2005–06, 2015-16, 2016-17, 2020–21

- Domestic One-Day Cup Runner-up: 10

1979–80, 1981–82, 1982–83, 1990–91, 1997–98, 1998–99, 2013–14, 2014–15, 2021-22, 2023–24

- KFC Twenty20 Big Bash Champions: 1

2008–09

- Champions League Twenty20 Champions: 1

2009

== Squad ==
Players with international caps are listed in bold.

Players contracted to New South Wales for the 2025/26 season are as follows:

No.	Name	Nat.	Birth date	Premier Cricket club	Batting style	Bowling style	Notes
Batters
14	Oliver Davies	(Australia)	14 October 2000 (age 26)	Manly Warringah	Right-handed	Right-arm off break	
5	**Sam Konstas**	(Australia)	2 October 2005 (age 21)	Sutherland	Right-handed	—N/a	Cricket Australia contract
53	**Nic Maddinson**	(Australia)	21 December 1991 (age 34)	Eastern Suburbs	Left-handed	Slow left arm orthodox	
45	Blake Nikitaras	(Australia)	29 April 2000 (age 26)	St George	Left-handed	—N/a	
17	**Kurtis Patterson**	(Australia)	5 May 1993 (age 33)	St George	Left-handed	—N/a	
49	**Steve Smith**	(Australia)	2 June 1989 (age 37)	Sutherland	Right-handed	Right-arm leg spin	Cricket Australia contract
26	Riley Kingsell	(Australia)	26 September 2005 (age 21)	Bankstown	Right-handed	—N/a	Rookie contract
All-rounders
77	**Sean Abbott**	(Australia)	29 February 1992 (age 34)	Parramatta	Right-handed	Right-arm fast-medium	Cricket Australia contract
18	Jack Edwards	(Australia)	19 April 2000 (age 26)	Manly Warringah	Right-handed	Right-arm medium	Captain
19	Will Salzmann	(Australia)	19 November 2003 (age 22)	Sydney University	Right-handed	Right-arm medium-fast	
44	Jake Scott	(Australia)	10 January 2005 (age 21)	Campbelltown-Camden	Left-handed	Right-arm medium-fast	Rookie contract
13	Charlie Stobo	(Australia)	8 March 1995 (age 31)	Manly Warringah	Right-handed	Right-arm medium-fast	
Wicket-keepers
99	Matt Gilkes	(Australia)	21 August 1999 (age 27)	UNSW	Left-handed	—N/a	
22	**Josh Philippe**	(Australia)	1 June 1997 (age 29)	Western Suburbs	Right-handed	—N/a	
48	Lachlan Shaw	(Australia)	26 December 2002 (age 23)	Northern District	Right-handed	—N/a	
—	Ryan Hicks	(Australia)	18 March 2005 (age 21)	Mosman	Right-handed	Legbreak googly	Rookie contract
Spin bowlers
77	Joel Davies	(Australia)	28 October 2003 (age 23)	Manly Warringah	Left-handed	Slow left arm orthodox	
67	**Nathan Lyon**	(Australia)	20 November 1987 (age 38)	Northern District	Right-handed	Right-arm off break	Cricket Australia contract
2	**Tanveer Sangha**	(Australia)	26 November 2001 (age 24)	Campbelltown-Camden	Right-handed	Right-arm leg break	
66	**Adam Zampa**	(Australia)	31 March 1992 (age 34)	Sutherland	Right-handed	Right-arm leg break	Cricket Australia contract
Pace bowlers
–	Charlie Anderson	(Australia)	20 January 2005 (age 21)	Northern District	Right-handed	Right-arm medium	Rookie contract
30	**Pat Cummins**	(Australia)	8 May 1993 (age 33)	Penrith	Right-handed	Right-arm fast	Cricket Australia contract
27	**Ben Dwarshuis**	(Australia)	23 June 1994 (age 32)	Sutherland	Left-handed	Left-arm fast-medium	
28	Ryan Hadley	(Australia)	17 November 1998 (age 27)	Manly Warringah	Right-handed	Right-arm medium-fast	
7	Liam Hatcher	(Australia)	17 September 1996 (age 30)	Fairfield-Liverpool	Right-handed	Right-arm fast-medium	
8	**Josh Hazlewood**	(Australia)	8 January 1991 (age 35)	St George	Left-handed	Right-arm fast-medium	Cricket Australia contract
28	Jack Nisbet	(Australia)	27 January 2003 (age 23)	Sydney	Right-handed	Right-arm medium-fast	
56	**Mitchell Starc**	(Australia)	30 January 1990 (age 36)	Manly Warringah	Left-handed	Left-arm fast	Cricket Australia contract
4	**Chris Tremain**	(Australia)	10 August 1991 (age 35)	UNSW	Right-handed	Right-arm medium-fast	

== Records ==
=== Most first-class matches played ===
Rank	Matches	Player	Period
1	135	Greg Matthews	1982/83 – 1997/98
2	120	Phil Emery	1987/88 – 1998/99
3	115	Geoff Lawson	1977/78 – 1991/92
4	108	Mark Waugh	1985/86 – 2003/04
5=	107	Steve Rixon	1974/75 – 1987/88
5=	107	Moises Henriques	2006/07 – Present
Source:. Last updated: 20 March 2024.

=== Most first-class runs ===
Rank	Runs	Player	Career
1	9,309 (183 inns.)	Michael Bevan	1989/90 – 2006/07
2	8,416 (182 inns.)	Mark Waugh	1985/86 – 2003/04
3	8,005 (135 inns.)	Alan Kippax	1918/19 – 1935/36
4	6,997 (172 inns.)	Mark Taylor	1985/86 – 1998/99
5	6,946 (159 inns.)	Steve Waugh	1984/85 – 2003/04
Source:. Last updated: 28 May 2007.

=== Most first-class wickets ===
Rank	Wickets	Player	Matches	Average
1	417	Greg Matthews	135	28.64
2	395	Geoff Lawson	115	23.36
3	334	Arthur Mailey	67	27.66
4	325	Bill O'Reilly	54	16.52
5	322	Richie Benaud	86	26.00
Source:. Last updated: 31 May 2007.

== See also ==
- Cricket in New South Wales
- Cricket NSW
- NSW Premier Cricket
