= Career of Virat Kohli =

Indian cricketer career

Virat Kohli's career began when he made his debut in List A cricket, playing against Services in the Ranji One-Day Trophy, but he did not have the opportunity to bat during the match. On the international stage, he has been representing India since he was included in the ODl squad for the tour of Sri Lanka. Kohli was part of the team during India won the 2011 Cricket World Cup, the 2013 ICC Champions Trophy, the 2024 ICC Men's T20 world Cup and 2025 ICC Champions Trophy alongside several Asia Cups. He had previously led his side to the 2008 Under-19 Cricket World Cup title. In league cricket, Kohli has played for the Royal Challengers Bengaluru since the inception of the team in 2008 and was part of the team that won the 2025 and 2026 seasons.

== International career ==
=== 2008–2009: Debut and maiden stint ===
In August 2008, Kohli was included in the ODl squad for the tour of Sri Lanka and the Champions Trophy in Pakistan. Prior to the Sri Lankan tour, Kohli had limited experience, with only eight List A matches under his belt. So, his selection was considered a "surprise call-up". During the Sri Lankan tour, as both first-choice openers Sachin Tendulkar and Virender Sehwag, were unable to play due to injury, Kohli was required to fill the role of makeshift opener throughout the series. On August 18, 2008, Kohli made his international debut at the age of 19 in the first ODI of the tour, where he was dismissed for 12 runs, caught dead in front by an incutter from Nuwan Kulasekara. However, in the fourth match of the series, Kohli scored his maiden half century in the ODl format, with a total of fifty-four runs scored.

Following the postponement of the Champions Trophy to 2009, Kohli was picked as a replacement for the injured Shikhar Dhawan in the India A squad for the unofficial Tests against Australia A in September 2008. Despite limited opportunities, he managed to make an impact in the single innings that he participated in, scoring 49 runs. In October 2008, Kohli participated in a four-day tour match against Australia as part of the Indian Board President's XI team. The match featured a formidable Australian bowling line-up that consisted of Brett Lee, Stuart Clark, Mitchell Johnson, Peter Siddle and Jason Krejza. Despite this, Kohli displayed his batting prowess by scoring 105 runs in the first innings and an unbeaten 16 runs in the second innings, demonstrating his ability to perform against high-level international competition.

In November 2008, Kohli was selected for inclusion in the squad for the home ODI series against England. However, he was not given an opportunity to play in any of the matches. In December 2008, Kohli was awarded a Grade D contract by the Board of Control for Cricket in India (BCCI) as part of the annual contract list for the Indian national team which entitled him to receive ₹1.5 million (equivalent to ₹4.2 million or US$43,000 in 2023). Despite being awarded a contract, in January, Kohli was dropped for the five-match ODl series against Sri Lanka in Sri Lanka.

In July–August 2009, Kohli was selected in the four-team Emerging Players Tournament, held in Australia. He was selected to open the innings for the Indian Emerging Players team in the tournament, and he went on to have a standout performance. Kohli finished as the tournament's leading run-scorer, with a total of 398 runs from seven matches, at an average of 66.33. He was particularly impressive in the final match, where he scored 104 runs off 102 balls against the South Africa Emerging Players team in Brisbane. His strong performance helped lead his team to a 17-run victory and the tournament title. At the conclusion of the tournament, Kris Srikkanth, the chairman of the Indian national selection committee, expressed his admiration for Kohli's performance during the tournament. Kohli later stated that this tournament was a "turning point" in his career.

In August 2009, Kohli returned to the national team after recovering from a minor shoulder injury, replacing the injured Gautam Gambhir in the Indian squad for the tri-series in Sri Lanka. He was also utilized as a middle order batsman in the 2009 ICC Champions Trophy due to an injury sustained by Yuvraj Singh. In December of that year, he was included in the team for home ODI series against Sri Lanka and scored 27 and 54 in the first two ODIs before making way for Yuvraj, who regained fitness for the third ODI. However, due to the reoccurrence of a finger injury, Yuvraj was ruled out indefinitely, which led to Kohli's return to the team in the fourth ODI at Kolkata. In that match, Kohli scored his maiden ODI century–107 off 114 balls–while sharing a 224-run partnership for the third wicket with Gambhir. As a result of this performance, India won by seven wickets and sealed the series 3–1. (Note: In recognition of this achievement, Gautam Gambhir, who scored 150 not out in the match and received the player of the match award, graciously passed on the award to Kohli.)

=== 2010–2011: Rise through the ranks ===
In January 2010, Kohli was given the opportunity in tri-nation ODI tournament in Bangladesh, as Tendulkar was rested for the event. During the series, Kohli became just the third Indian player to score two ODI centuries before the age of 22. He was widely hailed for his performances, and ultimately emerged as the leading run-scorer of the series, with 275 runs from five innings at an impressive average of 91.66. After the match, the Indian captain MS Dhoni stated about Kohli that "he has grabbed his chances" and that "he has matured now." Dhoni went on to say that "To us, he comes as a 'humble guy'. He might come across different to the world."

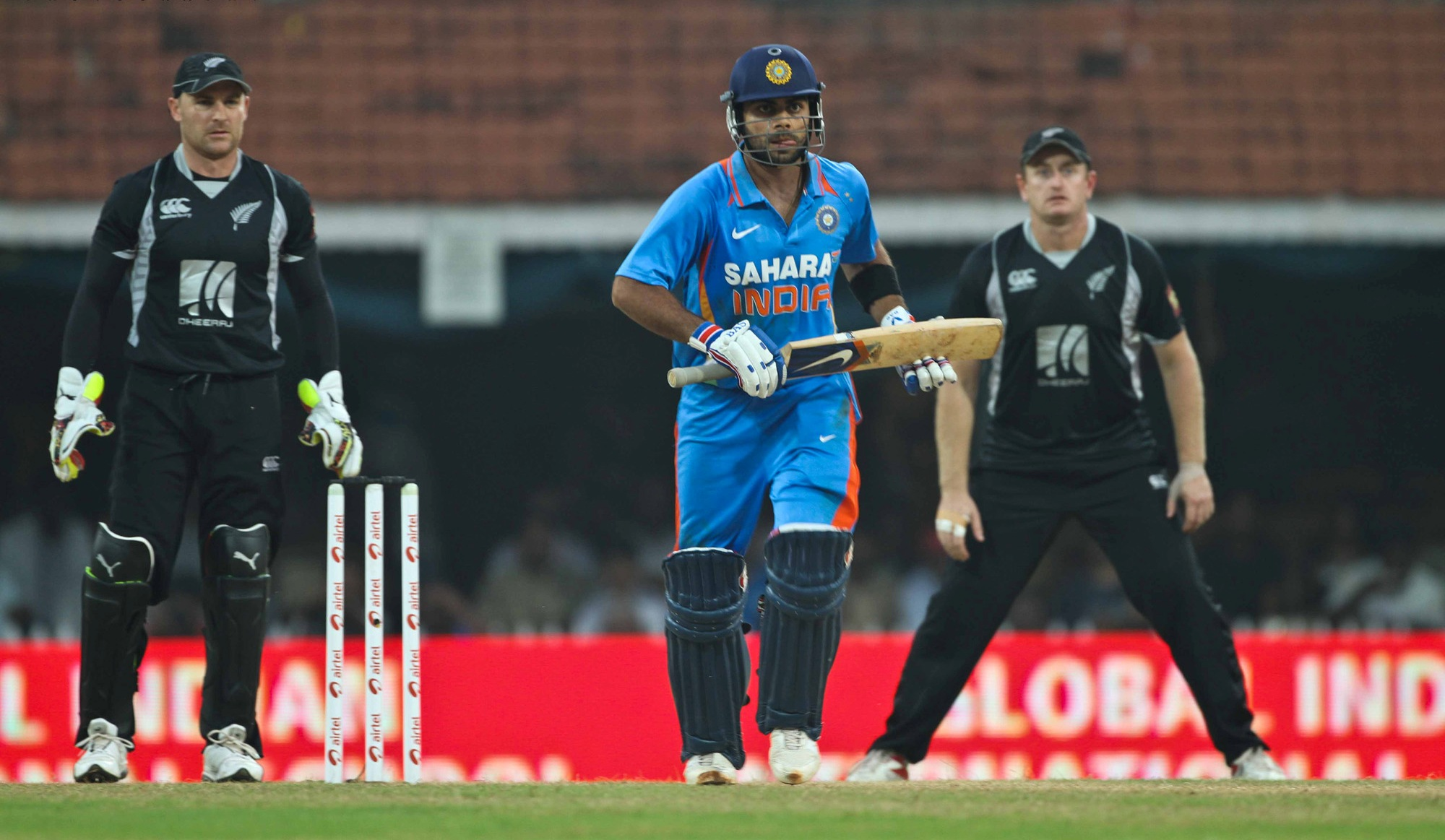
Kohli batting in an ODI against New Zealand in December 2010

Kohli's initial foray into leadership on an international level occurred in May–June 2010, when he was appointed as vice-captain for the tri-series against Sri Lanka and Zimbabwe in Zimbabwe. This appointment came as many established players were rested for the tour. However, in the first match, Kohli was dismissed for a duck, without facing a single delivery, a rare and unusual mode of dismissal. Despite this early setback, Kohli managed to become the fastest Indian batsman at the time to reach 1,000 runs in ODI cricket, achieving this milestone in 24 innings. Kohli also made his International T20 debut against Zimbabwe at Harare, where he scored an unbeaten 26. Later that month, during the 2010 Asia Cup, Kohli was included in the Indian team and was given the role of batting at number 3. However, his struggles with form started as he scored a total of 67 runs at an average of 16.75. This poor form was also reflected in the tri-series against Sri Lanka and New Zealand in Sri Lanka where his average was a mere 15.

Despite his recent struggles with form, Kohli was retained in the Indian ODI squad for a three-match series against Australia in October. In the only completed match of the series, held at Visakhapatnam, Kohli scored a century, earning him the man of the match award. He candidly acknowledged that he was under significant pressure to maintain his place in the team, given his previous failures in the preceding series. During the home ODI series against New Zealand, Kohli scored another match-winning century in the first match, marking his fourth ODI hundred and second in succession. The Indian team emerged victorious with a 5–0 whitewash over New Zealand, and Kohli's exceptional performances in the series solidified his position in the ODI team and made him a strong candidate for a spot in India's World Cup squad. He was India's leading run-scorer in ODIs in 2010, accumulating 995 runs from 25 matches at an average of 47.38, including three centuries and seven half-centuries.

"He is a very physical type of player. He likes to impose himself on the game, backs it up with his skill."

— Team India's coach Dav Whatmore at the 2008 Under-19 World Cup on Kohli,

Kohli was India's leading run scorer in the five-match ODI series of the South African tour in January 2011, with 193 runs including two fifties, both in Indian defeats. During the series, he jumped to number two spot on the ICC Rankings for Men's ODI batters, and was named in India's 15-man squad for the World Cup.

Kohli played every match of India's successful World Cup campaign. He scored an unbeaten 100 in the first match against Bangladesh and became the first Indian batsman to score a century on World Cup debut. In the final against Sri Lanka at Mumbai, he scored 35, sharing an 83 runs partnership with Gambhir for the third wicket after India had lost both openers within seven overs while chasing 275.

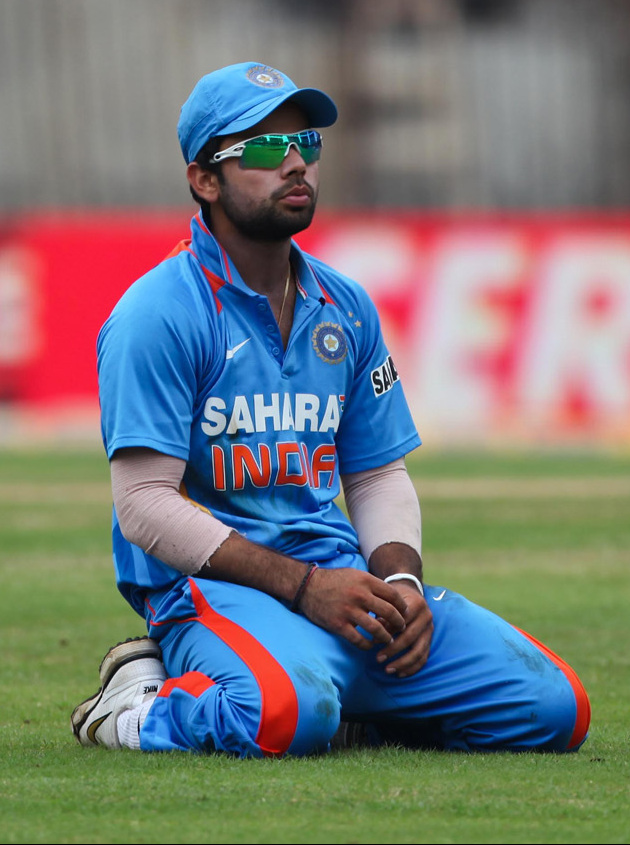
Kohli fielding during a match in December 2010

==== Breakthrough in Test cricket ====
When India toured the West Indies in June–July 2011, they selected a largely inexperienced squad, resting Tendulkar while others such as Gambhir and Sehwag missed out due to injuries. Kohli was one of three uncapped players in the Test squad. Kohli made his Test debut at Kingston in the first match of the Test series that followed. He batted at 5th position and was dismissed on scores of 4 and 15, caught behind off the bowling of Fidel Edwards in both innings. India went on to win the Test series 1–0 but Kohli amassed just 76 runs from five innings, struggling against the short ball.

He got dropped from the Test squad for India's four-match series in England in July and August due to poor performance in his debut series. However, Kohli was recalled as a replacement for the injured Yuvraj, though he did not get to play in any match of that series. He found moderate success in the subsequent ODI series in which he averaged 38.80. His score of 55 in the first ODI at Chester-le-Street was followed by a string of low scores in the next three matches. In the last game of the series at Cardiff, Kohli scored his sixth ODI hundred–107 runs off 93 balls–and shared 170 runs partnership with Rahul Dravid for the third wicket, who was playing his last ODI match. Kohli was dismissed hit wicket in that innings .It was the only century in the series by any player of either team and earned him praise for his "hard work" and "maturity".

In October 2011, Kohli was the leading run scorer of the five-match home ODI series against England which India won 5–0. He scored a total of 270 runs across five matches at an average of 90. This included unbeaten knock of 112 from 98 balls at Delhi, where he put on an unbroken 209 run partnership with Gambhir; followed by innings of 86 at Mumbai, both the knocks came in successful run chases. Owing to his ODI success, Kohli was included in the Test squad to face the West Indies in November. He was selected in the final match of the series at Mumbai in which he scored a pair of fifties. India won the subsequent ODI series 4–1 in which Kohli managed to accumulate 243 runs at 60.75. During the series, Kohli scored his eighth ODI century and his second at Visakhapatnam, where he made 117 off 123 balls in India's run chase of 270. A knock which raised his reputation as "an expert of the chase". Kohli ended up as the leading run-getter in ODIs for the year 2011, with 1381 runs from 34 matches at 47.62 including four centuries and eight fifties.

During tour of Australia in December 2011, Kohli failed to go past 25 in the first two Tests, as his defensive technique was exposed. While fielding on the boundary during the second day of the second match at Sydney, he gestured to the crowd with his middle finger for which he was fined 50% of his match fee by the match referee. He top scored in each of India's innings in the third Test at Perth with scores of 44 and 75, even as India got their second consecutive innings defeat. In the fourth and final match at Adelaide, Kohli scored his maiden Test century, 116 runs in the first innings. India suffered a 0–4 whitewash and Kohli, India's top run-scorer in the series was described as "the lone bright spot in an otherwise nightmare visit for the tourists".

=== 2012–2013: ODI ascendancy and ascension to vice-captaincy ===
In the first seven matches of the Commonwealth Bank triangular series that India played against hosts Australia and Sri Lanka, Kohli made two fifties–77 at Perth and 66 at Brisbane, both against Sri Lanka. Being set a target of 321 by Sri Lanka, Kohli came to the crease with India's score at 86/2 and went on to score 133 not out from 86 balls to take India to a comfortable win with 13 overs to spare. India earned a bonus point with the win and Kohli was named Man of the Match for his knock. Former Australian cricketer and commentator Dean Jones rated Kohli's innings as "one of the greatest ODI knocks of all time". However, Sri Lanka beat Australia three days later in their last group fixture and knocked India out of the series. With 373 runs at 53.28, Kohli finished as India's highest run-scorer and lone centurion of the series.

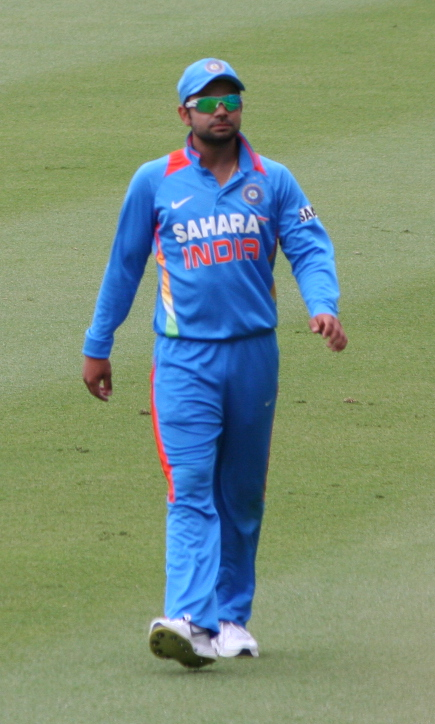
Kohli fielding during a CB Series match against Australia in February 2012

Kohli was appointed the vice-captain for the 2012 Asia Cup in Bangladesh on the back of his fine performances in Australia. Kohli was in fine form during the tournament, finishing as the leading run-scorer with 357 runs at an average of 119. In the final group stage match against Pakistan, he scored his personal best of 183 from 148 balls, his 11th ODI century. He helped India to chase down 330, their highest successful ODI run chase at the time. His knock was the highest individual score in Asia Cup history surpassing previous record of 144 by Younis Khan in 2004 and the joint second highest score along with Dhoni in an ODI run-chase; also became the highest individual score against Pakistan in ODIs. Kohli was awarded the man of the match in both the matches that India won, nonetheless India could not progress to the final of the tournament.

In July–August 2012, Kohli struck two centuries in the five-match ODI tour of Sri Lanka, 106 off 113 balls at Hambantota and 128* off 119 balls at Colombo, winning man of the match in both games. India won the series 4–1 and Kohli was named player of the series. In the one-off T20I that followed, he scored a 48 ball 68, his first T20I fifty, and yet again won the player of the series award. He continued to be in good form during the 2012 ICC World Twenty20 in Sri Lanka, with 185 runs he was highest run-getter among Indian batsmen; hitting two fifties during the tournament, against Afghanistan and Pakistan, winning man of the match for both his innings. For his performances he was named in the ICC 'Team of the Tournament'.

Kohli's test form dipped during the first three matches of England's tour of India, between October 2012 and January 2013, with a top score of 20 and England leading the series 2–1. Overcoming his poor run of form, he scored a patient 103 from 295 balls in the last match. However, the match ended in a draw and England won their first Test series in India in 28 years. Against Pakistan in December 2012, Kohli averaged 18 in the T20Is and 4.33 in the ODIs. Troubled by the fast bowlers, particularly Junaid Khan who dismissed him on all three occasions in the ODI series. Kohli had a quiet ODI series against England, apart from a match-winning 77* in the third ODI with a total of 155 runs at an average of 38.75. Kohli scored his fourth Test century (107) at Chennai in the first match of the home Test series against Australia in February 2013. India completed a 4–0 series sweep, becoming the first team to whitewash Australia in more than four decades. Kohli averaged 56.80 in the series.

"I love watching Virat Kohli bat. He looks to me like an individual of my own heart. I love his aggression, and he has serious passion that I used to have. He reminds me of myself."

— Former West Indies captain Viv Richards on Kohli.,

In June 2013, Kohli featured in the ICC Champions Trophy in England which India won. He scored a 144 against Sri Lanka in warm-up match. He scored moderately in India's group matches against South Africa, West Indies and Pakistan respectively. In sync India qualified for the semi-finals with an undefeated record. In the semi-final against Sri Lanka at Cardiff, he struck 58* in an eight-wicket win for India. The final between India and England at Birmingham was reduced to 20 overs after a rain delay. India batted first and Kohli top-scored with 43 from 34 ball, helping India reach 129/7 in 20 overs. India went on to secure a five run win and their second consecutive ICC ODI tournament victory. Kohli was also named as part of the 'Team of the Tournament' by the ICC.

==== Setting records and post-Tendulkar era ====
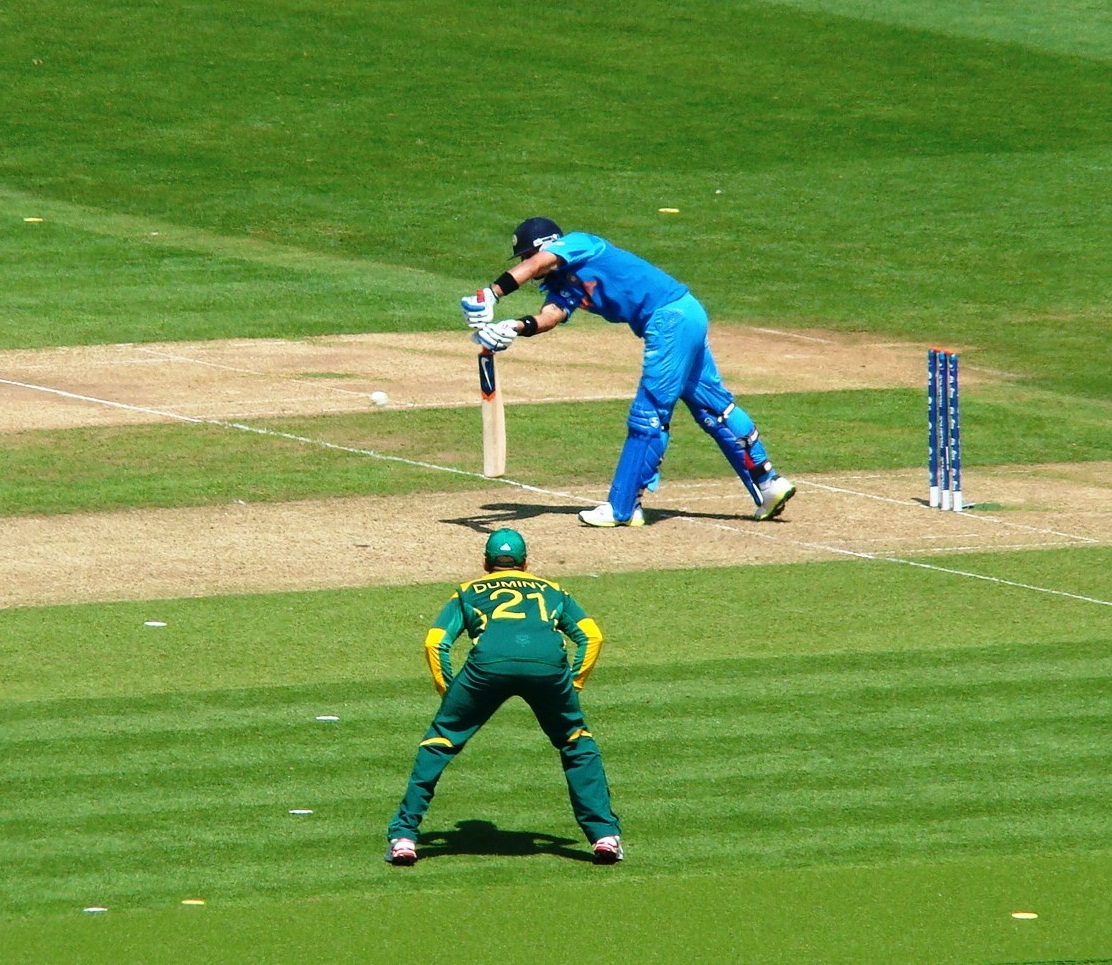
Kohli batting against South Africa in Cardiff during the Champions Trophy in June 2013

Kohli stood in as the captain for the first ODI of the triangular series in the West Indies after Dhoni injured himself during the match; Kohli being named the captain for the remaining matches. In his second match as captain, Kohli scored his first century as captain, making 102 off 83 balls against the West Indies at Port of Spain in a bonus point win for India. Many senior players including Dhoni were rested for the five-match ODI tour of Zimbabwe in July 2013. Kohli was therefore appointed as captain for an entire series . In the first game of the series at Harare, he struck 115 runs from 108 balls, helping India chase down the target of 229 and winning the man of the match award. India completed a 5–0 sweep of the series; their first in an away ODI series.

Kohli had a successful time with the bat in the seven-match ODI series against Australia. After top-scoring with 61 in the opening loss at Pune, he struck the fastest century by an Indian in ODIs in the second match at Jaipur. Reaching the milestone in just 52 balls and putting up an unbroken 186 run partnership for second wicket with Rohit Sharma, that came in 17.2 overs. Kohli's innings of 100* helped India chase down the target of 360 with more than six overs to spare. This chase was the second-highest successful run-chase in ODI cricket at the time while Kohli's knock became the fastest century against Australia and third fastest in a run chase. In the sixth ODI at Nagpur, he struck 115 off only 66 balls to help India successfully chase the target of 351 and level the series 2–2 . He reached the triple-digit figure in 61 balls, making it the third fastest ODI century by an Indian batsman subsequently became the fastest batsman in the world to score 17 hundreds in ODI cricket. India clinched the series after winning the last match in which he was run out for a duck. At the conclusion of the series, Kohli moved to the top position in the ICC ODI batsmen rankings for the first time in his career.

"I always had a different kind of feeling when I started working with Virat Kohli. From the beginning, I was very sure that he was a rare talent and would become a great player. He grew massively in these past few years and has matured a lot. I was fortunate to be part of that process of seeing him grow and that give me immense pleasure."

— Gary Kirsten, who was India's coach from 2008 to 2011, on Kohli,

Kohli batted twice in the two-match Test series against the West Indies, and had scores of 3 and 57 . This was also the last Test series for Tendulkar and Kohli was expected to take Tendulkar's number 4 batting position after the series. In the first game of the three-match ODI series that followed at Kochi, Kohli made 86 to seal a six wicket win and won the man of the match. He missed out on his third century at Visakhapatnam in the next match, after being dismissed for 99 while playing a hook shot off Ravi Rampaul. India lost the match by two wickets, but took the series 2–1 after winning the series-decider at Kanpur. With 204 runs at 68.00, Kohli finished the series as the leading run-getter and was awarded the man of the series. India toured South Africa in December 2013 for three ODIs and two Tests. Kohli averaged 15.50 in the ODIs including a duck. In the first Test at Johannesburg, playing his first Test in South Africa and batting at 4 for the first time, Kohli scored 119 and 96. His hundred was the first by a subcontinent batsman at the venue since 1998. The match ended in a draw and Kohli was awarded man of the match. India failed to win a single match on the tour, losing the second Test by 10 wickets in which he made 46 and 11.

=== 2014: T20 World Cup and assuming Test-captaincy ===
Virat's record as Test captain
Matches	Won	Lost	Drawn	Tied	No result	Win %
68	40	17	11	0	–	70.17%

During New Zealand tour, he averaged 58.21 in the five-match ODI series. However, his efforts went in vain as India were defeated 4–0. He made 214 runs at 71.33 in the two-match Test series that followed including an unbeaten 105 on the last day of the second Test at Wellington that helped India save the match. India then traveled to Bangladesh for the Asia Cup and World Twenty20. Dhoni was ruled out of the Asia Cup after suffering a side strain during the New Zealand tour, which led to Kohli being named the captain for the tournament. Kohli scored 136 off 122 balls in India's opening match against Bangladesh, sharing a 213 run third wicket stand with Ajinkya Rahane, which helped India successfully chase 280. It was his 19th ODI century and his fifth in Bangladesh, making him the batsman with most ODI centuries in Bangladesh. India were knocked out of the tournament after narrow losses against Sri Lanka and Pakistan in which Kohli scored 48 and 5 respectively. Dhoni returned from injury to captain the team for 2014 ICC World Twenty20 while Kohli was named vice-captain. Kohli played a crucial knock of 36 off 32 balls against Pakistan, the highest score in that match. He then scored 54 off 41 balls against West Indies and an unbeaten 57 from 50 balls against Bangladesh, both in successful run chases. In the semi-final against South Africa, he made an unbeaten 72 in 44 deliveries to help India achieve the target of 173. He won the man of the match for this knock. In the final against Sri Lanka India posted the target of 130/4 in which Kohli top scored 77 from 58 balls. Notwithstanding his innings, India lost the match by six wickets. Kohli made a total of 319 runs in the tournament at an average of 106.33, a record for most runs by an individual batsman in a single World Twenty20 tournament. For his achievement he won the Man of the Tournament award.

"Kohli is the next chosen one. He exudes the intensity of Dravid, the audacity of Sehwag, and the extraordinary range of Tendulkar. That doesn't make him better, simply sui generis, his own unique kind."

— Former New Zealand captain Martin Crowe on Kohli,

Kohli's tour of England was a challenging one, marked by a series of underwhelming performances. He scored a total of 134 runs in the series in 10 innings, at an average of 13.4, with a top score of 39. He found himself dismissed for single-digit scores on six occasions, and appeared to struggle particularly with the swinging deliveries aimed at his off stump. This resulted in several dismissals by means of edges caught by the wicket-keeper or slip fielders. James Anderson, who was named Man of the Series, was particularly successful in dismissing Kohli, accounting for four of his wickets. Kohli's technique and ability as a batsman were subjected to analysis and critique from cricket experts and former players after the series. Despite India emerging victorious in the following ODI series by 3–1, Kohli's batting performance did not see significant improvement. He scored with an average of 18 runs in four innings, in the ODI series. However, in the single T20I match, he exhibited a resurgence with a 41-ball 66, marking his first score of over 50 during the tour. Despite India's defeat in the match by a margin of three runs, Kohli's performance earned him the top position in the ICC T20I batsmen rankings.

Kohli had a successful time during India's home ODI series win over the West Indies in October 2014. His 62 in the second ODI at Delhi was his first fifty across Tests and ODIs in 16 innings since February and he stated that he got his "confidence back" with the innings. Dhoni was rested for the five-match ODI series against Sri Lanka in November enabling Kohli to lead the team for another full series. Kohli batted at 4 throughout the series and showed moderate batting display in the first four ODIs with India leading the series 4–0. In the fifth ODI at Ranchi, he made an unbeaten 139 off 126 balls to give his team a three-wicket win and a whitewash of Sri Lanka. Kohli was awarded player of the series and it was the second whitewash under his captaincy. During the series he became the fastest batsman in the world to go past the 6000-run mark in ODIs, at the time. With 1054 ODI runs at 58.55 in 2014, he became the second player in the world after Sourav Ganguly to make more than 1,000 runs in ODIs for four consecutive calendar years.

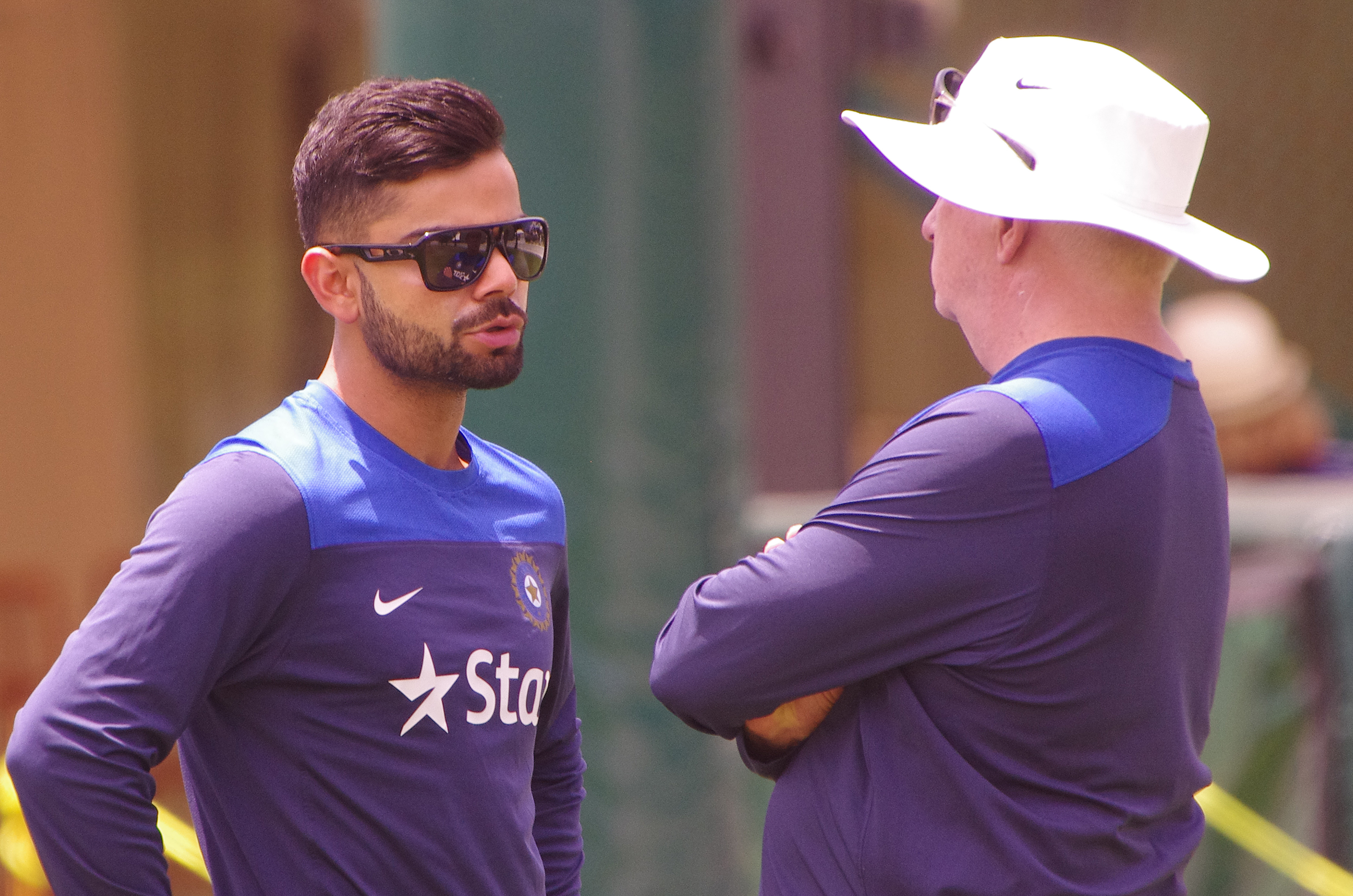
Virat in discussion with coach Duncan Fletcher ahead of the Border–Gavaskar series

For the first Test of the Australian tour in December 2014, Dhoni was not part of the Indian team at Adelaide due to an injury and Kohli took the reins as Test captain for the first time. Kohli scored 115 in India's first innings, becoming the fourth Indian to score a hundred on Test captaincy debut. In their second innings, India were set a target of 364 to be scored on the fifth day. Kohli put on 185 runs for the third wicket with Murali Vijay before Vijay's dismissal, which triggered a batting collapse. From 242/2, India was bowled out for 315 with Kohli's 141 off 175 balls being the top-score.

Dhoni returned to the team as captain for the second match at Brisbane where Kohli scored 19 and 1 in a four-wicket defeat for India. In the Melbourne Boxing Day Test, he made his personal best Test score (of that time) of 169 in the first innings while sharing a 262 runs partnership with Rahane, India's biggest partnership outside Asia in ten years. Kohli followed it with a score of 54 in India's second innings on the fifth day helping his team draw the Test match. Dhoni announced his retirement from Test cricket at the conclusion of this match and Kohli was appointed as the full-time Test captain ahead of the fourth Test at Sydney. Captaining the Test team for the second time, Kohli scored 147 runs in the first innings of the match and became the first batsman in Test cricket history to score three hundreds in his first three innings as Test captain. He was dismissed for 46 in the second innings and the match ended in a draw. Kohli's total of 692 runs in four Tests is the most by any Indian batsman in a Test series in Australia.

=== 2015–2016: World Cups and limited-over success ===
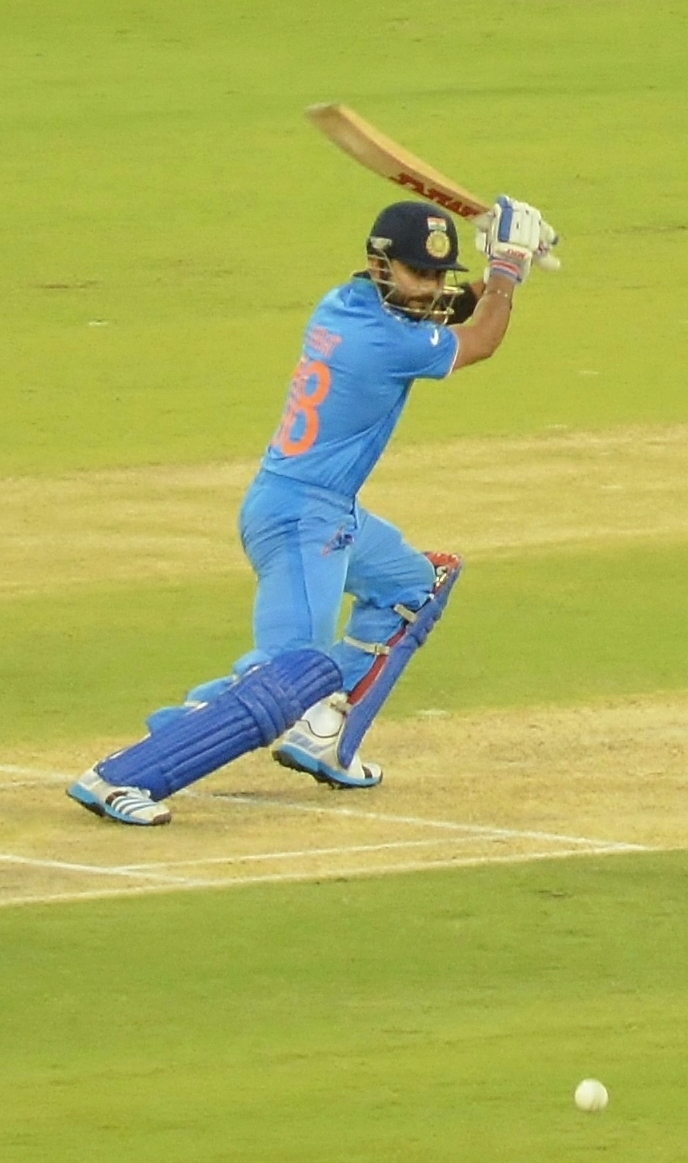
Virat Kohli batting against UAE during 2015 Cricket World Cup

Kohli's form in the lead-up to the World Cup was not at its peak, as evidenced by his scores of 18 and 5 in the warm-up matches against Australia and Afghanistan. Despite his less-than-stellar form in the warm-up matches, Kohli was able to rise to the occasion and deliver a commanding performance in the first match of the World Cup against Pakistan at Adelaide by scoring 107 runs from 126 deliveries. This feat earned him the man of the match award and established him as the first Indian batsman to score a century against Pakistan in a World Cup match. In India's second match of the tournament, against South Africa, Kohli was dismissed for a score of 46. Despite this setback, India went on to secure a commanding 130-run victory in the match. In the subsequent four group matches, India batted second, and Kohli maintained his form, contributing to the team's success with a series of steady performances. He scored 33* against UAE, 33 against West Indies, 44* against Ireland, and 38 against Zimbabwe, respectively. India secured wins in all four fixtures and topped Pool B with an undefeated record. During a highly anticipated semi-final match against Australia at Melbourne, the Indian team suffered elimination from the tournament. Despite the high expectations for their performance, India's efforts were ultimately thwarted by their opponent. In this contest, Kohli, was dismissed for a score of 1 from 13 deliveries.

Kohli had a slump in form when India toured Bangladesh in June 2015. He contributed only 14 in the one-off Test which ended in a draw and averaged 16.33 in the ODI series which Bangladesh won 2–1. Kohli ended his streak of low scores by scoring his 11th Test hundred in the first Test of the Sri Lankan tour which India lost. India won the next two matches to seal the series 2–1, Kohli's first series win as Test captain and India's first away Test series win in four years. During South Africa's tour of India, Kohli became the fastest batsman in the world at that time to make 1,000 runs in T20I cricket, reaching the milestone in his 27th innings. In the ODI series, he made a century in the fourth ODI at Chennai that helped India win and level the series. India lost the series after a defeat in the final ODI and Kohli finished the series with an average of 49. India came back to beat the top ranked South African team 3–0 in the four-match Test series under Kohli's captaincy, and climbed to number two position on the ICC Test rankings. Virat scored a total of 200 runs in the series at 33.33.

Kohli started 2016 with scores of 91 and 59 in the first two ODIs of the limited-overs tour of Australia. He followed it up with a pair of hundreds, a run-a-ball 117 at Melbourne and 106 from 92 balls at Canberra. During the course of the series he became the fastest batsman in the world to cross the 7000-run mark in ODIs at the time, getting to the milestone in his 161st innings and the fastest to get to 25 centuries. After the ODI series ended in a 1–4 loss, the Indian team came back to whitewash the Australians 3–0 in the T20I series. Kohli made fifties in all three T20Is with scores of 90*, 59* and 50, winning two man of the matches as well as the man of the series award. He was also instrumental in India winning the Asia Cup in Bangladesh the following month, where he scored 49 in a run-chase of 84 against Pakistan, followed by an unbeaten 56 against Sri Lanka and 41 not out in the Final against Bangladesh. Kohli maintained his good form in the 2016 ICC World Twenty20 in India, scoring 55* in another successful run-chase against Pakistan. He struck an unbeaten 82 from 51 balls in India's must-win group match against Australia in "an innings of sheer class" with "clean cricket shots". It helped India win by six wickets and register a spot in the semi-final. In the semi-final, Kohli top-scored with an unbeaten 89 from 47 deliveries, but West Indies overhauled India's total of 192 and ended India's campaign. His total of 273 runs in five matches at an average of 136.50 earned him his second consecutive Man of the Tournament award at the World Twenty20. He was named as captain of the 'Team of the Tournament' for the 2016 World Twenty20 by the ICC.

Playing his first Test in the West Indies since his debut series, Kohli scored 200 in the first Test at Antigua to ensure an innings-and-92-run win for India, their biggest win ever outside of Asia. It was his first double hundred in first-class cricket and the first made away from home by an Indian captain in Tests. India went on to wrap the series 2–0 and briefly top the ICC Test Rankings before being displaced by Pakistan at the position. He scored another double hundred, 211 at Indore in the third Test against New Zealand as India's 3–0 whitewash victory saw them regain the top position in the ICC Test Rankings.

=== 2017–2018: Dominant batting and leadership ===
Virat's record as White ball captain
	Matches	Won	Lost	Tied	No result	Win %
ODI	95	65	27	1	2	70.43%
T20I	50	30	16	2	2	64.58%

Kohli got double centuries in the next two Test series against England and Bangladesh, making him the first batsman ever to score double centuries in four consecutive series. He broke the record of Australian great Donald Bradman and Rahul Dravid, both of whom had managed to get three. Against England, he scored his then-highest Test score of 235.

Kohli got the chance to captain in an ICC tournament for the first time in the 2017 ICC Champions Trophy. In the semi-final against Bangladesh, Kohli scored 96* and became the fastest batsman in terms of innings to reach 8,000 runs in ODIs in 175 innings. India reached the final, but lost to Pakistan by 180 runs. In the third over of Indian innings, Kohli was dropped in the slips for just five runs but caught the next ball by Shadab Khan at point on the bowling of Mohammad Amir. He was also named as part of the 'Team of the Tournament' at the 2017 Champions Trophy by the ICC.

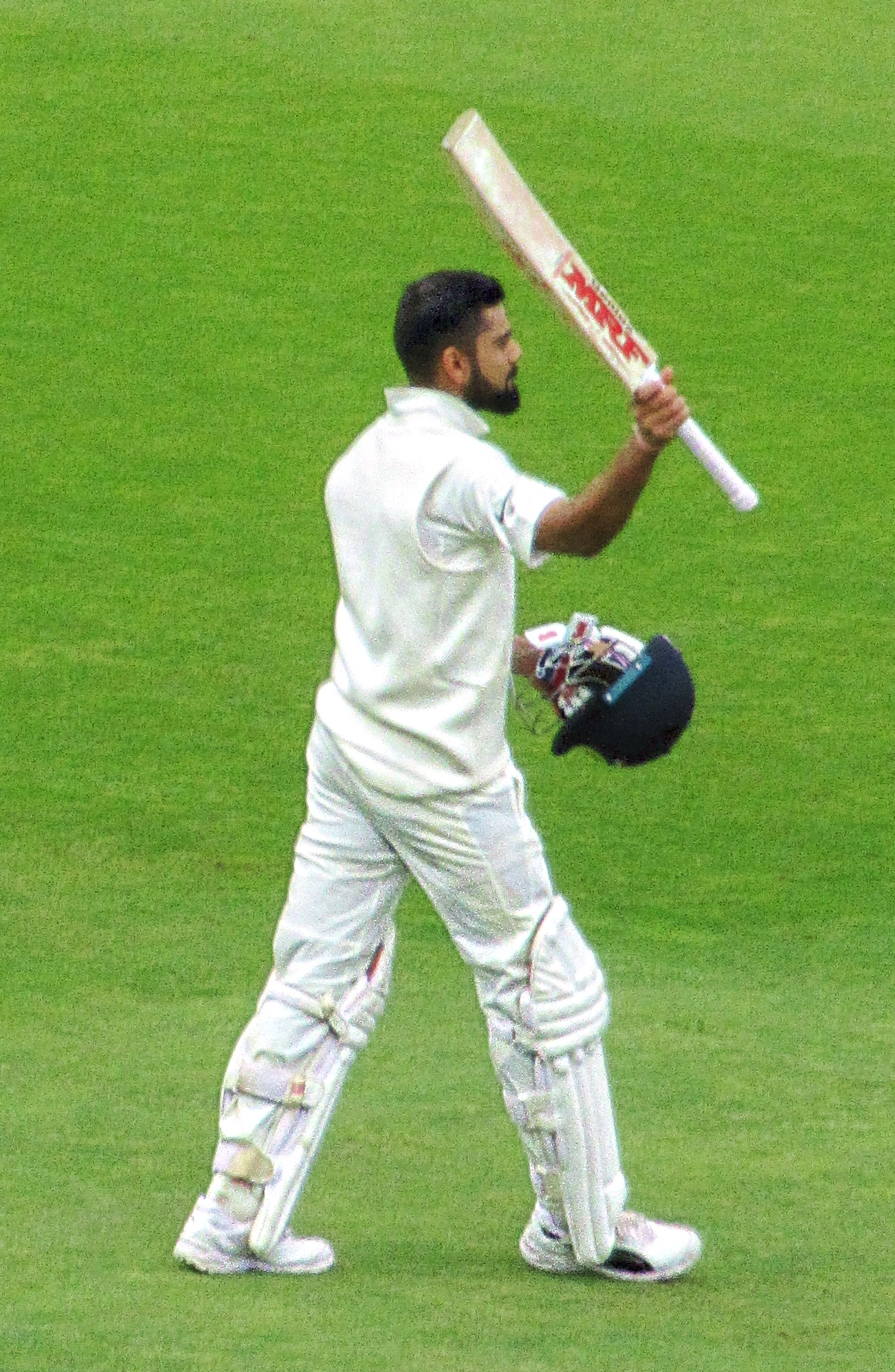
Virat Kohli after scoring a hundred against England in 2018 Test series

Kohli carried on his form with ODI centuries against the West Indies and Sri Lanka in consecutive series, equaling Ricky Ponting's tally of 30 ODI centuries. In October 2017, he was adjudged the ODI player of the series against New Zealand for scoring two ODI centuries, during the course of which he made a new record for the most runs (8,888), best average (55.55) and highest number of centuries (31) for any batsman when completing 200 ODIs. Kohli made several more records during the 3 match Test series against Sri Lanka at home in November. After scoring a century and a double century in the first two Tests, he ended up scoring yet another double century in the third Test during which he became the eleventh Indian batsman to surpass 5000 runs in Test cricket while scoring his 20th Test century and 6th double century. During this match he also became the first batsman to score six double hundreds as a captain. With 610 runs in the series, Kohli also became the highest run-scorer by an Indian in a three-match Test series and the fourth-highest overall. India comfortably won the three-match series 1–0 and Kohli was adjudged man of the match for the second and third Test matches and player of the series. With this win, India equaled Australia for the record streak of nine consecutive series wins in Test cricket. He ended the year with 2818 international runs, which is recorded as the third-highest tally ever in a calendar year and the highest tally ever by an Indian player. The ICC named Kohli as captain of both their World Test XI and ODI XI for 2017. Kohli farely averaged in the Test matches as India lost 1–2 during the South Africa tour in 2018 but came back strongly to score 558 runs in the 6 ODIs making a record for the highest runs scored in a bilateral ODI series. This included three centuries, remaining unbeaten in two with a best of 160*. India won the ODI series 5–1 and Kohli became the first Indian captain to win an ODI series in South Africa.

In March 2018, Kohli showed interest to play county cricket in England in June in order to improve his batting before the start of India's tour to England the following month. He signed to play for Surrey but a neck injury ruled him out of his stint in England before it even began. On 2 August, Kohli scored his first Test century on English soil in the first test match of the series against England. On 5 August, Kohli displaced Steve Smith to become the No. 1 ranked Test batsman in the ICC Test rankings. He also became the seventh Indian batsman and first since Sachin Tendulkar in June 2011 to achieve this feat. In the third test at Trent Bridge, Nottingham, Kohli scored 97 and 103 and helped India win by 203 runs. At the end of 5-match test series, Kohli scored 593 runs which was third highest runs by an Indian batsman in a losing test series. Kohli's consistent performance in the series against the moving ball when other batsman failed to perform was hailed by British Media as one of his finest. The Guardian described Kohli's batting display as "one of the greatest batting displays in a losing cause."

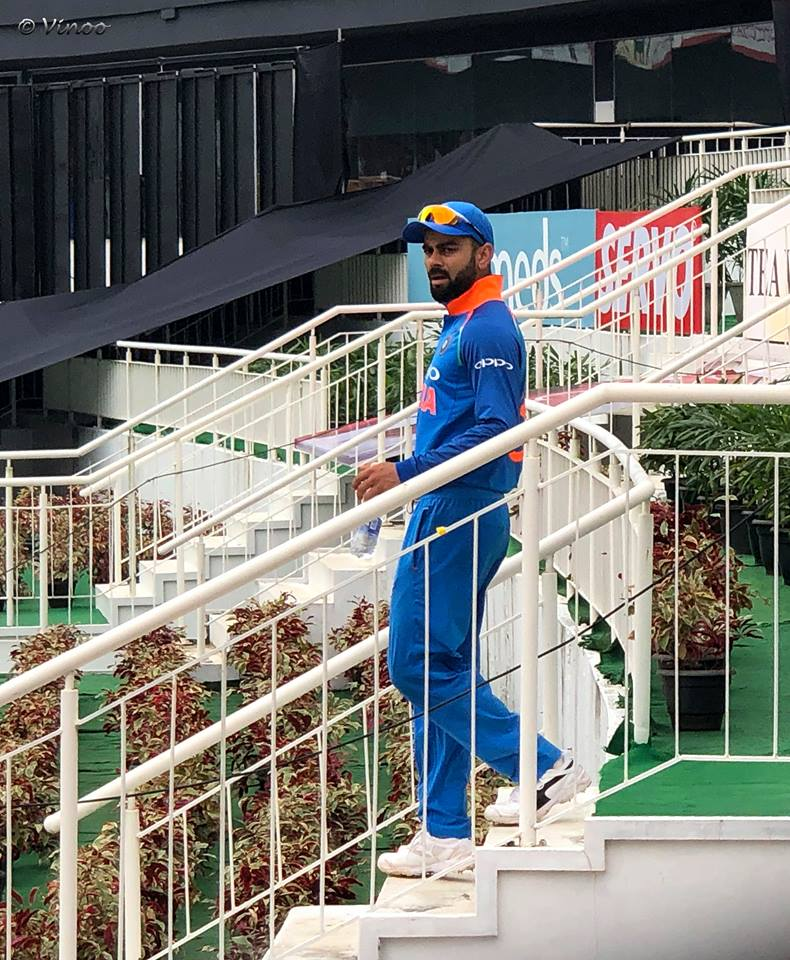
Kohli at Greenfield Stadium during match with West Indies

During ODI series against West Indies in 2018, Kohli accomplished a noteworthy achievement. He became the twelfth batsman to amass 10,000 ODI runs in ODIs and achieved this feat at an unprecedented pace, he surpassed this landmark in 54 fewer innings than Sachin Tendulkar, the player who holds the record for being the second-fastest to the landmark. In the course he scored his 37th ODI century. On 27 October, after scoring his 38th ODI century Kohli became the first batsman for India, first captain and tenth overall to score three successive centuries in ODIs. He ended up scoring 453 runs in 5 innings at an average of 151.00 in the 5-match series and was the Player of the Series.

On 16 December 2018 in the 2018–2019 Border–Gavaskar Trophy, Kohli scored his 25th test hundred in Perth. His knock of 123 was his 6th hundred in three tours to Australia making him the only Indian to score 6 test hundreds in Australia after Sachin Tendulkar. He also became the fastest Indian and second fastest overall (125 innings) to score 25 test hundreds, second only to Donald Bradman (68 innings); which was bettered by Steven Smith during 2019 Ashes (119 innings). Kohli's knock was rated by several analysts and former cricketers as one of his finest against a quality Australian attack. Although he broke several records in the game his innings proved to be insufficient as India went down by 146 runs as Australia leveled the series with two tests remaining. Overall, he finished the series with 282 runs at an average of 40. By winning the test series in Australia he had become the first Indian and also the first Asian skipper to win a test series in Australia. He was again named as captain of both the World Test XI and ODI XI for 2018 by the ICC.

=== 2019–2020: Record breaking captaincy and batting woes ===
In April 2019, he was named the captain of India's squad for the 2019 Cricket World Cup. On 16 June 2019, in India's match against Pakistan, Kohli became the fastest batsman in terms of innings to score 11,000 runs in ODI cricket. He reached the landmark in his 222nd innings. Eleven days later in the match against the West Indies, Kohli became the fastest cricketer in terms of innings to score 20,000 runs in international cricket, doing so in his 417th innings. Kohli scored five consecutive fifty plus scores in the tournament . Nonetheless, India lost the semi-final against New Zealand in which Kohli was out for just a run. After the World Cup, India toured West Indies for 3 T20Is and 3 ODIs followed by two test matches . Kohli was instrumental in ODI series win as he struck back to back hundreds in second and third ODI. He was awarded player of the series for his match performances. In the following test series which India won 2–0, Kohli became most successful test captain for India, going past MS Dhoni who had 27 wins.

In October 2019, Kohli captained India for the 50th time in Test cricket in the second Test against South Africa. In the first innings of the match, Kohli scored an unbeaten 254 runs, which is his personal best, while passing 7,000 runs in Tests. In the process, he subsequently became the first batsman for India to score seven double centuries in Test cricket. In November 2019, during the day/night Test match against Bangladesh, Kohli became the fastest captain to score 5,000 runs in Test cricket, doing so in his 86th innings. In the same match, he also scored his 70th century in international cricket.

India toured to New Zealand from January to March 2020 to play 5-match T20I series along with a 3 and 2-match ODI and test series respectively. During the tour, Kolhi only managed to score 218 runs across formats in 12 innings at an average of 19.81 with only one fifty plus score during the first ODI. This was his lowest aggregate of runs in a tour where he played in all formats. India managed to win the T20I series 5–0 but during the ODI and Test leg of the tour they lost by 3–0 and 2–0 respectively. The Indian team travelled to Australia in November 2020, touring until January 2021. During the ODI Series, Kohli managed to score two half-centuries in three innings with an aggregate of 173 runs at an average of 57.67. The second match against Australia was Kohli's 250th appearance in an ODI match and became 8th Indian to play this many matches. During the first test of the tour played as day/night match at Adelaide, Kohli scored 74 before getting run out followed by 4 runs in the next innings. This happened in the match in which India were skittled out for 36 . After the first Test, Kohli left the tour on paternity leave as he was expecting the birth of his first child. In November 2020, Kohli was nominated for the Sir Garfield Sobers Award for ICC Male Cricketer of the Decade as well as Test, ODI and T20I player of the decade. He won the awards for Male cricketer of the decade and ODI cricketer of the decade.

=== 2021–2022: Captaincy exit and resurgence ===
The English cricket team's tour of India in 2020–2021 began with a long 4-match Test series. Kohli made 172 runs across 4 Test matches, at an average of 28.66 with 2 half-centuries and 2 ducks. During the second test at Chepauk, he scored 62 on a spin-friendly pitch which English batting great Geoffrey Boycott described as a template to bat and score runs on a turning pitch.

Kohli was dismissed for a duck again in the 1st T20I of a 5-match series. However, he found his form in the latter part of the series and ended the series as the highest run-scorer from both sides with 231 runs to his name and 3 half-centuries at an average of 115.50. India clinched the series 3–2; Kohli was adjudged as the Man of the Series for his performances. During the second T20I, Kohli became the first ever batsman to complete 3,000 runs in the format. In the 3-match ODI series, Kohli scored 129 runs in 3 innings with 2 half-centuries as India won the series 2–1. During the 2nd ODI, Kohli became the second batsman after Ricky Ponting to score 10,000 runs batting at number 3.

The 2021 ICC World Test Championship Final was played in June 2021, which India lost to New Zealand. This was Kohli's third defeat as captain in a knockout game of an ICC tournament. He scored 44 and 13 in two innings before getting dismissed by Kyle Jamieson on both occasions .

The Indian cricket team toured England in August and September 2021 to play five Test matches, following the conclusion of WTC Final. In the first four matches, Kohli scored a total of 249 runs, at an average of 27.66, including a duck and a couple of half-centuries. In the 4th test of the series, Kohli became the fastest batsman, in terms of innings, to score 23,000 runs in international cricket (490). In the same match, he scored his 10,000th run in first-class cricket. The fifth test of the series was postponed following positive COVID-19 results in the Indian team. Throughout the series, he was troubled by swinging deliveries and edged many deliveries, outside the off-stump, to the slip-fielders and wicket-keeper. Despite his batting woes, India won two of the four matches, with Kohli becoming the 2nd captain after Kapil Dev to win two tests in a series in England.

In September 2021, Kohli was named as the captain of India's squad for the 2021 ICC Men's T20 World Cup. However, Kohli also publicly announced his decision to step down from the role of T20I captain following the tournament's conclusion. India was unable to advance to the semi-final round, marking the first time in a period of 9 years that India had been excluded from the tournament's latter stages.

In December 2021, Kohli was replaced by Rohit Sharma as India's ODI captain. The BCCI President, Sourav Ganguly, disclosed that Kohli's removal from the ODI captaincy was attributed to the selectors decision to avoid having two leaders for the white ball format. However, he also conveyed that Kohli was asked to remain the captain of the T20I. During a press conference, Kohli disputed the BCCI President's statement, affirming that his decision to step down from the captaincy was "well-received" and viewed as a "positive move" by the BCCI officials. Kohli also claimed that he was informed about his dismissal from the ODI captaincy by the chief selector, Chetan Sharma, 90 minutes before the announcement of the Test squad for India's tour of South Africa. More than a week later, during the announcement of the squad for the ODI series against South Africa, Chetan Sharma refuted Kohli's claim and stated that the officials had urged him to reconsider his decision to relinquish his role as T20I captain.

Later in 2021 and early 2022, the Indian cricket team toured South Africa for a 3-match test series and a 3-match ODI series. Kohli managed to score 161 runs in the 4 innings of test series he played, averaging at 40.25. He could not play 2nd test of the series due to back spasm. On 15 January 2022, Kohli also stepped down as India's Test captain, following the 2–1 test series defeat against South Africa. In the ODI series, Kohli scored 116 runs in 3 innings, including two fifties, with an average of 38.66. However South Africa swept the ODI series against India with a whitewash of 3–0.

The West Indian cricket team toured India in February 2022, for a 3-match ODI series and a 3-match T20I series. During the ODI series, Kohli scored 5,000th run in India in ODIs. He scored a total of 26 runs from 3 innings at an average of 8.66. In the following T20I series Kohli scored a total of 69 runs at an average of 34.50 with the help of a half-century. In February–March 2022, Sri Lankan cricket team toured India for a 3-match T20I series and 2-match test series. Kohli amassed a total of 81 runs from the 3 innings, in the 2-match test series, at an average of 27.0. When playing first-match of series in Mohali, Kohli also completed hundred Test matches, becoming only the 12th Indian cricketer to play this many matches.

Following the fifth test, the Indian cricket team toured England for 3 T20Is and 3 ODIs in 2022. Kohli was rested for the first T20I but was selected to play the second. He finished the series with 12 runs in 2 innings at an average of 6, a high score of 11, anyhow India won the series 2–1 Kohli was selected to play during the first ODI but was ruled out due an injury in the groin. Kohli failed to impress many and finished the ODI series with 33 runs from 2 innings with a high score of 17 and an average of 16.50, regardless India still won the ODI series 2–1.

Kohli made a resurgence of his form during the Asia Cup 2022. Over the course of the tournament, he amassed a total of 276 runs with an average of 92, The highlight of his performance was his maiden T20I century against Afghanistan, a knock that saw him score 122 runs from 61 deliveries, it was his first century in 1020 days. He later said in post match presentation that:

"Last two and a half years have taught me a lot. I am going to turn 34 in a month. So those angry celebrations are a thing of the past. I have had many suggestions, lot of advice has come my way; people were telling me I was doing this wrong, that wrong, I picked out all the videos from the best time I had; same initial movement, same approach towards the ball and it was just what was happening inside my head I wasn't able to explain it to anyone"

— Kohli after scoring 71st century,

He carried his good form into the 2022 ICC Men's T20 World Cup. In the first game against Pakistan, Kohli scored 82* and won the match for his team by a close margin. During the match he hit a six down the ground of Haris Rauf, which is remembered as one of the greatest sixes of all time. He rated this as his best innings in the format due to the magnitude which the game had. Wisden, the prestigious almanack of cricket, deemed this particular innings as the acme of the tournament. Kohli finished as the highest run-scorer in the tournament, with 296 runs to his name at an average of 98.66. For his performances, he was included in Team of the tournament.

Kohli was named in India's Test and ODI squad for India Tour of Bangladesh in 2022–23. In third-match, he scored his 44th ODI and overall 72nd century surpassing Ricky Ponting's record of the second-most centuries scored across formats in international cricket.

=== 2023–2025: Resurgence and T20I & Test Retirements ===
In the early part of the year, Kohli began his campaign with a century against the touring Sri Lankan side in ODI. In the third match of the series, Kohli amassed an unbeaten 166 runs from 110 balls. It was his 21st ODI century in India, the most by any player in a single country, and his 10th against Sri Lanka, the most by any player against any opposition. Additionally, his performance in this match elevated him to become the fifth highest run-scorer in ODI cricket, going ahead of Mahela Jayawardene. Following Kohli's performance, India went on to win the third ODI match by a record margin of 317 runs.

In February–March 2023, Kohli played in the Border–Gavaskar series of 2023. He faced a string of low scores in the initial three tests, before scoring a century in the final test at Ahmedabad, at the 75 Years of Friendship through Cricket Event. He amassed a total of 186 runs in the match with his century being his first in the format in three years. On 20 July 2023, during the Test series against West Indies, Kohli became the 10th player to play in 500 international matches. Simultaneously became the first player to register a fifty-plus score in a 500th international match whilst scoring his 29th Test century. It is noteworthy that, upon the culmination of their initial five hundred matches, Kohli boasts the preeminent position in terms of accumulated runs.

In August 2023, he was selected in India's squad for 2023 Asia Cup. In the opening match against Pakistan, Kohli could only score 4 runs before being bowled by Shaheen Afridi. The match, however, was called off due to rain. He did not get to bat in the second match against Nepal as India won the match without losing any wicket. However, in the next match against Pakistan, Kohli scored a century and stitched an unbeaten 233 run partnership with KL Rahul, making it the highest partnership in the history of the tournament.

I think he is one of the four most charismatic cricketers I have seen, along with Imran Khan, Shane Warne and Viv Richards, and I cannot think there has been a better ODI player in history.

— Michael Atherton, reflecting on Kohli's stature in the game.

He was named in India's squad for the 2023 Cricket World Cup, his fourth appearance in the tournament. In the opening match against Australia, India were at 2 for 3, with the top order collapsing again similar to India's previous WC match against New Zealand in the 2019 WC semi-final. In response, he made 85 in a partnership of 165 runs with KL Rahul as India chased the target. He made a century against Bangladesh and a 95 against New Zealand.

Kohli reached a significant milestone during the World Cup match against Sri Lanka at the Wankhede Stadium in Mumbai. He accomplished the feat of scoring the most number of 1000 runs in a calendar year. This marked the eighth time in Kohli's career that he achieved this milestone, surpassing the previous record held by Sachin Tendulkar, who had scored 1000 or more runs seven times in his career. In the following match against South Africa on 5 November 2023, which was also Kohli's 35th birthday, he scored his 49th century in 277 innings, equaling Tendulkar's record of 49 centuries in 438 innings. In the semi-final against New Zealand, Kohli surpassed Tendulkar's haul and became the only player to score 50 centuries in the format. During the match, he also surpassed Tendulkar's record and became the first batsman to hit 700 runs in a single World Cup edition. Kohli was awarded the Player of the Tournament title in the ICC ODI World Cup 2023 as he scored a record 765 average of 95.62.

Early in 2024, Kohli missed the entire Test series against England at home due to "personal reasons", which as revealed was the birth of his second child. In May, he was named in India's squad for the 2024 ICC Men's T20 World Cup tournament, which India eventually won. Despite being out of form for most of the tournament, scoring only 75 runs before the finals, Kohli was player of the match in the final scoring 76 runs off 59 balls against South Africa. Kohli scored 151 runs in the 8 matches India played. After India's win, Kohli announced his retirement from T20Is, saying that this was his last T20 game playing for India and it was the time for the next generation to take over.

Overall, he had a below-average 2024, scoring only 655 runs in 23 matches with an average of 21.83 and just one century.

In 2025 ICC Champion's trophy match against Pakistan, following his unbeaten 100 against Pakistan, he scored 84 runs off 98 balls, the most for India in the semi-final match against Australia, helping India win by four wickets. This victory secured India's spot in the final He also surpassed Tendulkar's record for most 50-plus scores in ICC ODI tournaments, with 24 scores to his name, along with being India's top run-scorer in the tournament's history. Overall Kohli had a solid performance in the 2025 ICC Champions Trophy, scoring 217 runs over four matches. However, in the final match against New Zealand, he was dismissed for just 1 run. Nonetheless, India went on to win the tournament by four wickets. For his performances, he was named in team of the tournament by ICC. Later, on 12 May 2025, he announced his retirement from the Test format with the fifth test of 2024-25 Border-Gavaskar Trophy played in Sydney being his last Test match. Following his Test retirement, the three-match ODI series against Australia in October 2025 saw Kohli initially struggle, as he registered two consecutive ducks in the first two matches of the series. However, he bounced back in the final ODI at the SCG in Sydney, scoring a match-winning, unbeaten 74* off 81 deliveries forming a crucial unbeaten 168 run partnership with Rohit Sharma to help India secure a nine-wicket victory. During the three-match ODI series against South Africa at home, Kohli achieved multiple world records in that series. In the first match at Ranchi, he scored 135 off 120 deliveries which was his 52nd century in a single format (ODIs), breaking Sachin Tendulkar's record of 49 ODI centuries. He followed this with his 53rd ODI century scoring 102 off 93 deliveries in the 2nd match at Raipur extending his world record for the most instances of scoring back-to-back ODI centuries to 11. Kohli finished the series as the leading run-scorer with 302 runs at an exceptional average of 151, culminating in an unbeaten 65* off 45 in the decider in Visakhapatnam and earning him the Player of the Series award for a record-extending 12th time in his ODI career helping India to win the series 2-1.

=== Later Years (2026–present) ===
Kohli began 2026 with scores of 93, 23 and 124 in the ODI series against New Zealand national cricket team. He was named Player of the Match for his 93 in the opening ODI and scored 124 in the series-deciding match. However, it went in vain as India lost by 41 runs.

== Franchise career ==
=== Royal Challengers Bangalore ===
In 2007, the Board of Control for Cricket in India (BCCI) introduced the Indian Premier League (IPL), a franchise-based Twenty20 league. Among the franchises, Royal Challengers Bangalore, owned by Vijay Mallya at the time, selected Kohli to join their team for a sum of $50,000 through a draft. This decision was influenced by Kohli's performance in the Under-19 World Cup held in Malaysia.

==== 2008–2009: Early seasons ====
In the inaugural match of the IPL, Kohli played in a high-stakes encounter against the Kolkata Knight Riders, where he fell early to a dismissal, contributing a single run to the team's pursuit of a target of 223 runs. As the tournament progressed, Kohli found himself occupying a position in the middle order, but his impact in this role was relatively limited, prompting a strategic decision to reinstate him at the top order during the match against the Deccan Charges. It was in this role that he rediscovered his form and made contributions to his team's cause. However, in the last two games of the tournament, Kohli had to sacrifice his preferred position in order to accommodate Misbah-ul-Haq, taking on the responsibility of batting in the middle order once again. Concluding the season, Kohli's individual performance yielded a total of 165 runs, as Bangalore secured the seventh position on the points table. In the subsequent season, Kohli encountered a series of low scores in the initial two matches before bouncing back with a half-century in the third match against Deccan Chargers, in team's defeat. Throughout the remainder of the season, Kohli displayed moderate performances or found limited opportunities to bat, owing to the dominance of top-order batsmen Jacques Kallis and Ross Taylor. This proved advantageous for the team, as they secured a spot in the playoffs. In the semi-final against Chennai Super Kings, Kohli made crucial contributions to the team's successful chase, propelling Bangalore to the final. In final against Deccan Charges, Kohli got stumped for 7 as Bangalore fell short by a margin of 8 runs, thus concluding the season as runners-up.

==== 2010–2012: Rise, retention and realization ====
In the 2010 season of the IPL, Kohli, assuming the role of vice-captain for the Bangalore, was positioned strategically in the middle order. He augmented Bangalore's batting depth and made notable contributions to the team's success. Notably, his contribution was observed during a victory over the Kings XI Punjab, where he played an instrumental role in concluding the match. His cameos in away fixtures against the Chennai Super Kings and Kings XI Punjab, forging valuable partnerships, particularly with Kevin Pietersen, were crucial. Kohli's standout performance came in futile encounter against the Deccan Chargers, where he scored 58 runs at a strike rate of 165. As the season progressed, Kohli's fielding prowess also came to the fore, augmenting his contribution to the team's cause. Upon securing a place in the playoffs, the Bangalore team confronted Mumbai Indians in the semi-final. Bangalore suffered a setback, succumbing to a defeat margin of 35 runs, as Kohli's contribution was limited to a tally of 7 runs in Bangalore's total, thereby ending Bangalore's campaign in the tournament. In the Champions League Twenty20 held in September, the Bangalore team found themselves in an encounter against the Mumbai Indians. In pursuit of a target of 165 runs, Kohli played a steady innings, contributing 47 runs. The match came down to the final ball, which resulted in Kohli's dismissal, leading to Bangalore falling short by a margin of 2 runs. As a consequence, their upcoming game against the Lions became a virtual knockout match. In this must-win encounter, Kohli scored 49* runs, guiding his team to victory and securing a place in the semi-finals. In the semi-final clash against the Chennai Super Kings, Bangalore faced a significant defeat of 52 runs(D/L method).

Prior to the 2011 season of the IPL, Kohli was the sole player retained by Bangalore, for an amount of US$1.8 million. In the opening match against the Kochi Tuskers Kerala, Kohli started his campaign with a score of 23 runs. He registered his first half-century of the season against the Deccan Chargers, in pursuit of what was then the second-highest run chase, however Bangalore fell short by 33 runs. After lacklustre start for Bangalore, winning two out of their first six matches, Kohli scored 56 runs in the next match against the Delhi Daredevils, and was awarded the player of the match for the first time in the tournament. In the subsequent match, he continued his form against the Pune Warriors, where he claimed his second player of the match award. It was during this match that Kohli became the leading run-scorer of the season, donning the Orange cap for the short time, and he also surpassed the milestone of 1000 runs in the IPL. During the mid-tournament, with regular captain Daniel Vettori sustaining an injury, Kohli had the opportunity to captain his side for the first time in an IPL match. Team's coach, Ray Jennings praised Kohli for his efforts, acknowledged his potential to become the future captain not only of the franchise but also of the Indian national team. The team ended their league stage campaign on a high note, defeating the Chennai Super Kings and securing the top position on the points table. In the first qualifier, Kohli scored 70 off 44 balls. Setting a target of 175 runs, Bangalore failed to defend, resulting in knockout match against the Mumbai Indians. In the knockout match, Bangalore triumphed over Mumbai, securing their place in the IPL final for the second time. In the final, chasing a target of 205 runs, Kohli contributed 35 runs to the team's total. However, Bangalore once again fell short in their pursuit of the title. During the season, Kohli amassed 557 runs, including four half-centuries, and earning the distinction of being the second-highest run-scorer of the season, trailing West-Indian teammate Chris Gayle. In the Champions League, Bangalore encountered a defeat in their first match against the Warriors. In the following match, Kohli got dismissed for a duck, leading to another loss for Bangalore. To secure a spot in the semi-finals, they needed to win their remaining two matches. In their last group-stage match against the Southern Redbacks, Kohli showcased his aggressive batting by scoring 70 runs off just 36 balls, propelling Bangalore into the semi-finals. In the semi-final clash against the New South Wales Blues, Kohli once again played match-winning innings, scoring an unbeaten 84 runs. However, in the final showdown against the Mumbai Indians, Bangalore suffered a defeat by a margin of 31 runs. In the 2012 season of the IPL, Kohli registered single-digit scores in the first two matches before bouncing back in the third match against the Chennai Super Kings, scoring 57 runs. He struggled to maintain consistency in subsequent matches, reaching a total of 165 runs by the ninth game. Kohli did manage to contribute 45 runs in the following match against the Kings XI Punjab to his team's cause. As the season progressed, ineffectiveness of Bangalore's captain, Daniel Vettori, as a player led to a strategic alteration. Vettori made the decision to step down as captain and handed the leadership role to Kohli for the remaining matches of the season. His breakthrough performance in the season came during the match against the Delhi Daredevils where he scored 73* and formed a record-breaking partnership of 203 runs with his teammate Gayle. In their final match of the season, Bangalore faced the Deccan Chargers with the necessity of must-win to qualify for the playoffs. Kohli contributed 42 runs to the team's chase before being dismissed in the 16th over. His dismissal triggered a collapse in Bangalore's batting order, resulting in their eventual defeat and elimination from the tournament during the group stage. During the season, Kohli accumulated a total of 364 runs, garnered over the course of 16 matches. He returned from the League with a sense of disillusionment with his own performance and was dissatisfied with the state of his game. He recognized the need for improvement and adaptation to the evolving dynamics of cricket.

==== 2013–2014: Leadership role and tribulations in batting ====
Following Vettori's retirement, Kohli assumed the role of full-time captain for the Bangalore team starting from the 2013 season of the IPL. Prior to the commencement of this season, he was highest run-scorer for Bangalore with a tally of 1,639 runs. Kohli embarked on the tournament with a consistent start, but suffered a loss against the Sunrisers Hyderabad in an away game. In their subsequent home match, once again against Hyderabad, Kohli scored unbeaten 93 while chasing, marking his highest individual score in Twenty20 cricket at that time. Continuing his form, Kohli went on to score back-to-back fifties in the matches against the Chennai Super Kings and the Delhi Daredevils, the latter of which was decided through a super over. After a defeat against the Mumbai Indians, Kohli found himself embroiled in a disagreement with the crowd due to their aggressive demeanour towards the visiting team at the Wankhede Stadium. As the mid-season approached, Kohli encountered a dip in his performance, managing 45 runs in four innings. He bounced back during the away game against Delhi, where he came close to achieving a century, scoring 99 before being run out on the final delivery. With a strong start to the season that saw Bangalore occupying the top position in the table, the team's performance waned in the latter half of the tournament. Kohli openly addressed the issue, attributing their decline to a lack of execution by the bowling unit. In a bid to keep their playoff hopes alive, Bangalore confronted a must-win scenario in their final match against Chennai. Opening the innings, Kohli scored an unbeaten 56 in a rain-affected match, ultimately leading his team to victory. However, Bangalore's hopes were shattered when the Hyderabad secured a win over the Kolkata Knight Riders, dashing their chances of advancing to the playoffs. As a result, Bangalore's season came to an end during the group stage. Prior to the seventh season of the IPL, Kohli was retained by Bangalore for ₹12.5 crore (US$1.3 million). His campaign commenced with an unbeaten score of 49 runs in a victorious encounter against the Delhi Daredevils. However, Kohli struggled to maintain his form and faced a dismissal without scoring in the second match. In a match against the Rajasthan Royals, Bangalore's batting lineup faltered, resulting in them being bowled out for 70, then third-lowest total in IPL history. Kohli contributed 21 runs to the team's total in that particular match. Bangalore heavily relied on the performances of Gayle and Kohli in their batting lineup, but neither of them had managed a significant innings thus far in the season. Kohli's struggles persisted as he recorded his third duck of the season in a match against the Kings XI Punjab. In an effort to address the batting woes, Kohli made the decision to alter his batting position and open the innings; however, this adjustment did not yield the desired outcome. With Bangalore losing six out of their nine games, Kohli had yet to reach the milestone of scoring a half-century. Meanwhile, the team was striving to secure victories in their remaining matches in order to qualify for the playoffs. In his twelfth game of the season against the Sunrisers Hyderabad, Kohli achieved his first fifty of the season. However, the subsequent defeat to the Kolkata Knight Riders, with Kohli contributing 38 runs before being dismissed by Sunil Narine for the second time, led to Bangalore's elimination from playoff contention for the third consecutive time. In their final match of the season against the Chennai Super Kings, Kohli showcased his best performance of the season, accumulating 73 runs. However, Bangalore suffered a defeat in that match. Despite the team's challenges, Kohli's popularity continued to soar, making him the most-searched player on the internet during the tournament.

==== 2015–2016: Collective and individual success ====
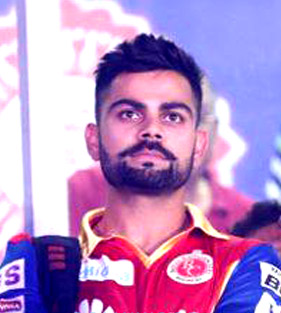
Kohli as the captain of RCB at 2015 IPL Opening Ceremony

At the outset of the 2015 season of the IPL, Kohli expressed his optimism about playing with reduced pressure, attributing it to the strengthened middle order of the Bangalore team. Kohli strategically decided to open the batting alongside Gayle for the season. In the second match against the Sunrisers Hyderabad, he scored 41 runs, providing a moderate start to his campaign. Continuing his form, Kohli achieved his first half-century of the season, albeit in a match that ended in defeat against the Chennai Super Kings. In the subsequent match, Kohli again notched a fifty, leading Bangalore to victory and ending their three-match losing streak. During this match, he promoted AB de Villiers up the batting order, recognizing the importance of having the team's premier batsman face more deliveries. Bangalore, looking to overcome their previous struggles in the bowling department, successfully bowled out the Delhi Daredevils for 95 runs, while Kohli guided his team to a ten-wicket victory during the chase. However, in an away game against Chennai, Kohli fell short of reaching a half-century, scoring 48 runs before being run out by Dwayne Bravo due to a momentary lapse in judgment. Bangalore's loss in that match marked the end of their winning streak. His standout innings of the season came against the Mumbai Indians, where he played a knock of 82 runs, forming a then record partnership of 215 runs with de Villiers. In a rain-affected match against the Hyderabad, with a target of 83 runs to chase in six overs, Kohli scored quickfire 44 off 19 balls, earning him player of the match award. In the subsequent game, Kohli found himself entangled in an incident involving an anti-corruption code breach. Nonetheless, he managed to continue playing due to breach's absence of severity. Qualifying for the playoffs for the first time under his captaincy, Kohli held firm confidence in the turnaround his team had showcased during the later stages of the league. However, in the qualifier 2 against Chennai, Kohli's dismissal for 12 runs proved detrimental to Bangalore's chances, resulting in their defeat and the conclusion of their campaign for the season. Throughout the season, Kohli accumulated a total of 505 runs in 16 matches with an average of 45.90, then third-highest run tally achieved by him in a single season.

In the 2016 season of the IPL, Kohli's campaign began with 75 runs, contributing to a victory of 45 runs against the Sunrisers Hyderabad. He continued his run in the subsequent match, scoring 79 runs. Throughout the early matches, Kohli consistently achieved the milestone of scoring half-centuries in three out of the four matches he played, while sharing three century partnerships with de Villiers. In the encounter against the Gujarat Lions, he registered his first century in Twenty20 cricket. Although the match ended in defeat for his team, Kohli's knock earned him the player of the match. Despite Kohli's performances, Bangalore struggled in the league stage, securing only two victories out of their seven matches and finding themselves in the seventh position on the points table. To revive their chances of qualifying for the playoffs, Bangalore needed to win six out of their next seven matches. In the subsequent match, Kohli scored a century in a successful chase against Rising Pune Supergiant as Bangalore's virtual knockouts began. He continued to deliver match-winning performances, forming a record partnership of 229 runs with de Villiers against the Gujarat, followed by playing a knock of 75* against the Kolkata Knight Riders. In a rain-affected match against the Kings XI Punjab, Kohli achieved his fourth century of the season, surpassing the milestone of 4,000 runs in the league. His batting drew high praise from Harsha Bhogle, who lauded his technical proficiency and shot-making. Kohli's consistent performances propelled Bangalore to the playoffs, as he scored four consecutive fifty-plus scores in must-win matches and finished the league stage with tally of 919 runs. In the playoffs, Bangalore faced Gujarat in the first qualifier. Kohli was dismissed for a duck in that match, however his team emerged victorious, setting up a final against the Hyderabad. Kohli contributed 54 runs in Bangalore's pursuit of target of 209 in the final. Notwithstanding, Bangalore fell short by a margin of 8 runs, leaving him to acknowledge the Hyderabad team's performance and express his gratitude to the Bangalore crowd for their support. Kohli concluded the season with record 973 runs in 16 matches, at an average of 81.08, establishing himself as the highest run-scorer of the tournament and claiming Orange Cap with the title of Most Valuable Player. Team's coach, Vettori, praised Kohli for his contributions, stating:

Virat has been phenomenal. When you have got a guy at the top of the order who takes that much control and his performances are that great, it allows things to flow from there. Obviously a great captain does that — leads with his performance and he has been exceptional not only with his batting, but also fielding and leadership.

==== 2017–2019: Fluctuating form and captaincy struggles ====
In the lead-up to the tenth season of the IPL, Kohli grappled with a shoulder injury, which sidelined him for the initial three fixtures of the tournament. Upon his return in the fourth match against the Mumbai Indians, he scored 62 runs, albeit in a defeat for Bangalore. Following this performance, Kohli delivered moderately in the subsequent two matches. However, in the face-off against the Kolkata Knight Riders, Kohli faced a setback after being dismissed for a duck as Bangalore stumbled to league's lowest score of 49 runs. He promptly criticized the batting display as reckless. In the encounter against the Rising Pune Supergiant, Kohli contributed 55 runs to his team's total of 96 runs. Expressing disappointment, Kohli attributed the team's struggles to a lack of intent and a fearful batting approach. With Bangalore facing defeat in seven out of their ten matches, their hopes for playoffs were dashed, particularly after their loss to the Mumbai Indians, making them the first team to be eliminated from contention. Wrapping up the tournament, Bangalore secured a victory in their last match against Delhi Daredevils, with Kohli scoring his fourth fifty of the season and amassing a total of 308 runs in 10 innings. Kohli concluded that the season as a whole was the team's most underwhelming performance to date. Commemorating the ten-year anniversary of the league, ESPNcricinfo honoured Kohli by including him in the all-time IPL-XI.

"He is a consummate surgeon at the crease, intensely focused, working hard, playing the ball into gaps in the field and staying calm under pressure. He is always judging the right time to consolidate and the right time to seize a game by the scruff of the neck."

— Kohli's RCB team mate AB de Villiers

Prior to the commencement of the 2018 season, Bangalore retained Kohli for sum of ₹17 crore (US$1.8 million), making him the league's most expensive player at the time. His campaign began with 33 runs in a defeat against the Kolkata Knight Riders, where he expressed his discontentment with the number of dot balls he faced. In contrast to his individual performances, which included twin fifties in the third and fourth matches, temporarily securing him the Orange Cap, Bangalore found themselves consistently on the losing side. This predicament was primarily attributed to the team's heavy reliance on Kohli and his partner de Villiers in the batting lineup, coupled with their challenges in the bowling department, which Kohli critiqued as being "criminal". As the tournament progressed, Bangalore gradually discovered their winning rhythm, propelled by Kohli's contributions, including scores of 70 and 48* in must-win encounters against Delhi Daredevils and Kings XI Punjab, respectively. He eventually surpassed the milestone of 500 runs in the season, a feat he accomplished for a record fifth time. However, in the decisive encounter against the Rajasthan Royals, Kohli faltered, managing 4 runs before succumbing to dismissal. This setback ultimately led to Bangalore's elimination from the tournament. In the aftermath of their exit, Kohli publicly scrutinized the team's middle-order batsmen for their failure to deliver substantial contributions during crucial matches, reflecting on the missed opportunities that defined their campaign.

Kohli's start to the 2019 season proved underwhelming, as he managed 6 runs in the opener against the Chennai Super Kings. Consequently, he opted to move down the batting order in an attempt to provide more depth. However, his struggle with form persisted, reflecting in Bangalore's losses and prompting a quick reversal of the decision. In an encounter against the Rajasthan Royals, Kohli marked his 100th appearance as Bangalore's captain. Albeit, that match ended in defeat, extending the team's losing streak to four consecutive matches. Former cricketer Gautam Gambhir weighed in on Kohli's lengthy tenure as captain, suggesting luck may have played a part despite his underwhelming performance as leader. Kohli eventually found his rhythm in the fifth match, where he managed to score a half-century against the Kolkata Knight Riders. However, Bangalore's string of losses persisted, prompting him to acknowledge his team's lackluster performance thus far. After enduring record six consecutive defeats, Bangalore secured their first victory against the Kings XI Punjab, with Kohli contributing 67 runs in that match. Subsequently, he scored his fifth century in the league; however, his subsequent form saw a dip, as he struggled to make significant contributions with the bat in Bangalore's successive victories. These wins, were not enough as Bangalore fell short in their bid to advance further in the tournament, marking their third consecutive elimination under Kohli's captaincy. Reflecting on the season, he expressed satisfaction with the team's turnaround in the latter stages of the tournament, acknowledging the progress made despite their early challenges.

==== 2020–2022: Performance plunge and captaincy departure ====
Following the resumption of cricket post the COVID-19 lockdown, Kohli returned to the field with cautious optimism. However, positioned at number 3, his start to the 2020 season was lackluster, tallying a total of 18 runs across the first three matches. In the fourth match, Kohli found his rhythm, and scored 72 runs against the Rajasthan Royals. His momentum continued as he played his standout innings of the season against the Chennai Super Kings, scoring an unbeaten 90. Throughout the season, Kohli adhered to a strategy of accumulating runs primarily through singles and doubles, thereby minimizing the reliance on boundaries. Under his captaincy, Bangalore secured victories in five of their opening eight matches, with Kohli himself contributing moderately, amassing a total of 389 runs by the conclusion of eleven matches. However, during the latter part of the season, Kohli's form dipped, coinciding with Bangalore's consecutive losses in four matches following their promising start. Despite these setbacks, Bangalore managed to qualify for the playoffs due to their net run rate. Kohli concluded the league stage with a cumulative total of 460 runs, albeit with a slower strike rate of 122. Analysts at ESPNcricinfo attributed this performance in part to the distinctive conditions of the season, notably the relocation of matches to the UAE, where larger boundaries and an inexperienced middle order might have influenced Kohli's risk-averse approach. In the playoffs, Bangalore encountered the Sunrisers Hyderabad in the eliminator. Kohli, assuming the opening position alongside Devdutt Padikkal, encountered an early setback, scoring 7 runs before his dismissal. Bangalore succumbed in the knockout encounter, prompting Kohli to reflect on a palpable sense of nervousness among the players, which contributed to their defeat. Ahead of the 2021 season opener, Kohli emphasized the strategic advantages of neutral venues for his team. In their inaugural match against the Mumbai Indians, Kohli commenced with a score of 33, which he replicated in the subsequent fixture. Notably, his first half-century of the season came against the Rajasthan Royals, where he scored an unbeaten 72, leading Bangalore to secure victory in four consecutive encounters. Upon the resumption of the league in September, Kohli became the first player to make 200 appearances for a singular franchise. Concurrently, Kohli announced his intention to relinquish the captaincy of Bangalore at the season's end, this decision was met with speculation, with Sandip of The Indian Express suggesting that it could potentially afford Kohli to play with more freedom. In subsequent fixtures, Kohli scored consecutive half-centuries against the Chennai Super Kings and Mumbai, his innings against the latter also marked the completion of 10,000 runs in T20 cricket. As the tournament progressed, Bangalore qualified for the playoffs, with two games to spare, attributed to performances by Glenn Maxwell and Harshal Patel in their respective domains. However, Kohli experienced a dip in form leading up to the playoffs, as Bangalore prepared to face Kolkata Knight Riders in the eliminator. In the knockout clash, where he notched up 39 runs, Bangalore was unable to secure victory, thus concluding Kohli's tenure as captain. In his post-match discourse, Kohli reaffirmed his commitment to delivering his utmost for Bangalore, while expressing gratitude for the loyalty and support extended by the franchise.

Prior to the onset of the 2022 season, Bangalore chose to retain Kohli for a sum of ₹15 crore (US$1.6 million). With Faf Du Plessis taking over the captaincy reins, Kohli commenced the season with a score of 41* against the Punjab Kings. However, positioned at number 3, Kohli's subsequent innings were marked by inconsistency, with sole significant contribution of 48 runs against the Mumbai Indians. Struggling to regain his form, Kohli endured two consecutive ducks in matches against the Lucknow Super Giants and Sunrisers Hyderabad. By the seventh match of the season, Kohli found himself registering single-digit scores in four out of seven matches, accumulating a total of 119 runs at an average of 17. Cricket analyst Jarrod Kimber, writing for ESPNcricinfo, remarked that Kohli's batting seemed enigmatic and uncertain. In an attempt to rectify his batting woes, Kohli was elevated to the opening position alongside du Plessis. It was in the tenth match that he managed to secure his maiden half-century of the season, albeit in 45 balls, marking it as his slowest in the T20 format. However, his struggles persisted, as he encountered another duck against Hyderabad, accumulating a total of 216 runs in twelve matches. Former Indian coach Ravi Shastri expressed his apprehension, suggesting that Kohli appeared "overcooked" and advocated for a break to rejuvenate himself. In concurrence with Shastri's assessment, Kohli asserted that he did not feel the need to prove himself to anyone and believed in his ability to bounce back. As the tournament progressed, Bangalore found themselves in a precarious position, requiring a victory in their final league match to remain in contention for the playoffs. Kohli rose to the occasion, scoring 73 runs against Gujarat Titans, and propelling Bangalore to victory. However, Kohli faltered in the subsequent eliminator and qualifier 2, spelling the culmination of Bangalore's campaign.

==== 2023–2026: Return to form and title wins ====
In the 2023 season, Kohli commenced his campaign with a score of 82* runs against the Mumbai Indians. He maintained his form in subsequent matches, registering fifties in three out of the first four matches. Kohli's batting approach during this period was marked by aggression in the powerplay overs, followed by a more cautious approach in the middle overs of the game. Reflecting on this tactical shift, Kohli noted that the middle overs are when teams typically introduce their premier bowlers, necessitating the assessment of the game's evolving dynamics. Moreover, in the absence of regular captain du Plessis, Kohli assumed the role of stand-in captain for several matches, while du Plessis contributed as an impact player. Eight matches into the season, Kohli had scored fifties in five of them. However, an altercation marred a match against the Lucknow Super Giants, where Kohli found himself in a confrontation with Gambhir, resulting in a fine for breaching the code of conduct. Throughout the season, Kohli relied on his placement and running between the wickets to maintain a scoring rate above a run a ball. As the season progressed, Bangalore needed victories in their final two games to clinch a spot in the playoffs. Kohli stepped up in a pivotal match against the Sunrisers Hyderabad, scoring a century, to secure a win for his team. In the subsequent fixture, he scored another century, surpassing Gayle for the most centuries in the league. However, Bangalore fell short in defending their total, leading to their elimination from the tournament. Kohli concluded the season with a tally of 639 runs at an average of 53.2 and a strike rate of 140.

In the 2024 season, Kohli began slow, scoring only 21 runs against the Chennai Super Kings, in a loss too. The next match however, he scored 77 runs against the Punjab Kings, a crucial knock, and he won Man of the Match. Kohli continued this type of form throughout the tournament, scoring 2 fifties in the first 4 games. In a game against the Rajasthan Royals, Kohli scored 113*, which is his highest score in the IPL. However, he did it in 72 balls, which was 12 out of 20 overs. Bengaluru lost this match, and was on a 6 game losing streak, before Kohli scored another fifty that helped them win against Sunrisers Hyderabad. Kohli scored two more fifties in the next 3 matches, including an impressive 92 off just 47 and the runout of Shashank Singh. RCB won the next 2 games to qualify for the playoffs, and after being on a 6 game losing streak, turned around a came back with a 6 game winning streak. However, they lost in the eliminator.

In the 2025 season, Kohli hit a record 8 fifties in wins and ended as the third highest run scorer, as RCB lifted their first title after 18 years.

Kohli enjoyed another prolific season in IPL 2026, scoring 675 runs and helping Royal Challengers Bengaluru retain the title. He finished as the franchise's leading run-scorer and scored an unbeaten 75 in the final against Gujarat Titans. Since 2025, RCB has won every single match where Kohli has scored fifty or more runs.

== ICC Tournaments ==
=== World Test Championship ===
Batting record

Cycle	Matches	Innings	Runs	Average	Strike rate	50	100
2019–21	15	24	934	42.45	54.17	5	2
2021–23	17	30	932	32.13	45.53	3	1
2023–25	14	25	751	32.65	58.30	3	2
Total	46	79	2617	35.36	51.72	11	5
Last updated: 29 March 2026

Bowling record

Cycle	Overs	Wickets	Runs	Economy rate	Average
2019–21	1	0	4	4.00	–
Last updated: 29 March 2026

=== Cricket World Cup ===
Batting record

Host and Year	Matches	Innings	Runs	Average	Strike rate	50	100
(India) (Bangladesh) (Sri Lanka) 2011	9	9	282	35.25	82.21	1	1
(Australia) (New Zealand) 2015	8	8	305	50.83	81.55	0	1
(England) (Wales) 2019	9	9	443	55.37	94.05	5	0
(India) 2023	11	11	765	95.62	90.31	6	3
Total	37	37	1795	59.83	88.20	12	5
Last updated: 06 March 2026

- Player of the Tournament

Bowling record

Host and Year	Overs	Wickets	Runs	Economy rate	Average
(India) (Bangladesh) (Sri Lanka) 2011	2	0	12	6.00	–
(Australia) (New Zealand) 2015	1	0	7	7.00	–
(India) 2023	3.3	1	15	4.29	15.00
Total	5.3	1	34	5.23	34.00
Last updated: 06 March 2026

=== T20 World Cup ===
Batting record

Host and Year	Matches	Innings	Runs	Average	Strike rate	50
(Sri Lanka) 2012	5	5	185	46.25	122.51	2
(Bangladesh) 2014	6	6	319	106.33	129.14	4
(India) 2016	5	5	273	136.50	146.77	3
(United Arab Emirates) (Oman) 2021	5	3	68	34	119.29	1
(Australia) (New Zealand) 2022	6	6	296	98.66	136.40	4
(Cricket West Indies) (United States) 2024	8	8	151	18.87	112.68	1
Total	35	33	1292♠	58.72	128.81	15
Last updated: 06 March 2026

- Player of the Tournament

Bowling record

Host and Year	Overs	Wickets	Runs	Economy rate	Average
(Sri Lanka) 2012	4	1	31	7.75	31.00
(India) 2016	1.4	1	15	9.00	15.00
Total	5.4	2	46	8.12	23.00
Last updated: 06 March 2026

=== Champions Trophy ===
Batting record

Host and Year	Matches	Innings	Runs	Average	Strike rate	50	100
(South Africa) 2009	3	2	95	95.00	74.21	1	0
(England) (Wales) 2013	5	5	176	58.66	95.65	1	0
(England) (Wales) 2017	5	5	258	129.00	98.85	3	0
(United Arab Emirates) (Pakistan) 2025	5	5	218	54.50	82.88	1	1
Total	18	17	747	74.70	89.35	6	1
Last updated: 21 March 2026

Bowling record

Host and Year	Overs	Wickets	Runs	Economy rate	Average
(South Africa) 2009	3	0	21	7.00	–
(England) (Wales) 2013	6	0	37	6.17	–
(England) (Wales) 2017	3	0	17	5.66	–
Total	12	0	75	6.25	–
Last updated: 21 March 2026

=== Under-19 World Cup ===
Batting record

Host and Year	Matches	Innings	Runs	Average	Strike rate	50	100
(Malaysia) 2008	6	6	235	47.00	94.75	0	1

Bowling record

Host and Year	Overs	Wickets	Runs	Economy rate	Average
(Malaysia) 2008	11.5	4	50	4.22	12.50

== ACC Tournaments ==
=== Asia Cup (ODI) ===
Batting record

Host and Year	Matches	Innings	Runs	Average	Strike rate	50	100
(Sri Lanka) 2010	4	4	67	16.75	69.07	0	0
(Bangladesh) 2012	3	3	357	119.00	102.00	1	2
(Bangladesh) 2014	4	3	189	63.00	102.71	0	1
(Sri Lanka) (Pakistan) 2023	5	3	129	64.50	114.15	0	1
Total	16	13	742	61.83	99.73	1	4
Last updated: 29 March 2026

Bowling record

Host and Year	Overs	Wickets	Runs	Economy rate	Average
(Sri Lanka) 2010	3	0	16	5.33	–
(Bangladesh) 2014	1.1	0	6	5.14	–
Total	4.1	0	22	5.28	–
Last updated: 29 March 2026

=== Asia Cup (T20I) ===
Batting record

Host and Year	Matches	Innings	Runs	Average	Strike rate	50	100
(Bangladesh) 2016	5	4	153	76.50	110.86	1	0
(United Arab Emirates) 2022	5	5	276	92.00	147.59	2	1
Total	10	9	429	85.80	132.00	3	1
Last updated: 29 March 2026

Bowling record

Host and Year	Overs	Wickets	Runs	Economy rate	Average
(United Arab Emirates) 2022	1	0	6	6.00	–
Last updated: 29 March 2026

== Franchise Tournaments ==
=== IPL ===
Batting record

Host and Year	Matches	Innings	Runs	Average	Strike rate	50	100
(India) 2008	13	12	165	15.00	105.09	0	0
(South Africa) 2009	16	13	246	22.36	112.32	1	0
(India) 2010	16	13	307	27.90	144.81	1	0
(India) 2011	16	16	557	46.41	121.08	4	0
(India) 2012	16	15	364	28.00	111.65	2	0
(India) 2013	16	16	634	45.28	138.73	6	0
(India) (United Arab Emirates) 2014	14	14	359	27.61	122.10	2	0
(India) 2015	16	16	505	45.90	130.82	3	0
(India) 2016	16	16	973	81.08	152.03	7	4
(India) 2017	10	10	308	30.80	122.22	4	0
(India) 2018	14	14	530	48.18	139.10	4	0
(India) 2019	14	14	464	33.14	141.46	2	1
(United Arab Emirates) 2020	15	15	466	42.36	121.35	3	0
(India) (United Arab Emirates) 2021	15	15	405	28.92	119.46	3	0
(India) 2022	16	16	341	22.73	115.98	2	0
(India) 2023	14	14	639	53.25	139.82	6	2
(India) 2024	15	15	741	61.75	154.69	5	1
(India) 2025	15	15	657	54.75	144.71	8	0
(India) 2026	16	16	675	56.25	165.84	5	1
Total	283	275	9336♠	40.41	134.79	68	9
Last updated: 31 May 2026

- The player with the most runs at the end of the tournament received the Orange Cap.

Bowling record

Host and Year	Overs	Wickets	Runs	Economy rate	Average
(India) 2008	7.4	2	46	7.95	30.50
(South Africa) 2009	6	0	45	7.50	–
(India) 2010	5.2	0	50	9.38	–
(India) 2011	17	2	139	8.17	69.50
(India) 2012	3	0	49	16.33	–
Total	39	4	329	8.44	82.25
Last updated: 29 March 2026

IPL centuries scored by Virat Kohli
No.	Runs	Against	Pos.	Inn.	S/R	Venue	H/A/N	Date	Result
1	100*	Gujarat Lions	1	1	158.73	Niranjan Shah Stadium, Rajkot	Away	24 April 2016	Lost
2	108*	Rising Pune Supergiants	1	2	186.20	M. Chinnaswamy Stadium, Bengaluru	Home	7 May 2016	Won
3	109	Gujarat Lions	2	1	198.18	M. Chinnaswamy Stadium, Bengaluru	Home	14 May 2016	Won
4	113	Punjab Kings	2	1	226.00	M. Chinnaswamy Stadium, Bengaluru	Home	18 May 2016	Won
5	100	Kolkata Knight Riders	2	1	172.41	Eden Gardens, Kolkata	Away	19 April 2019	Won
6	100	Sunrisers Hyderabad	1	2	158.73	Rajiv Gandhi International Cricket Stadium, Hyderabad	Away	18 May 2023	Won
7	101*	Gujarat Titans	1	1	165.57	M. Chinnaswamy Stadium, Bengaluru	Home	21 May 2023	Lost
8	113*	Rajasthan Royals	1	1	156.94	Sawai Mansingh Stadium, Jaipur	Away	6 April 2024	Lost
9	105*	Kolkata Knight Riders	2	2	175.00	Shaheed Veer Narayan Singh International Cricket Stadium, Raipur	Home	13 May 2026	Won

=== Champions League ===
Batting record

Host and Year	Matches	Innings	Runs	Average	Strike rate	50	100
(India) 2009	4	4	79	26.33	154.90	0	0
(South Africa) 2010	5	4	113	37.66	156.94	0	0
(India) 2011	6	6	232	46.40	145.91	2	0
Total	15	14	424	38.54	150.35	2	0
Last updated: 29 March 2026

Bowling record

Host and Year	Overs	Wickets	Runs	Economy rate	Average
(India) 2009	2	0	23	11.50	–
(South Africa) 2010	4	0	39	9.75	–
(India) 2011	3.3	0	33	9.43	–
Total	9.3	0	95	10.00	–
Last updated: 29 March 2026
