= English cricket team in Australia in 2026–27 =

International cricket tour

	Australia	England
- Dates: 13 November 2026 – 15 March 2027
Captains	Mitchell Marsh	Harry Brook

Test series

One Day International series
- Results: England won the 3-match series 2–1
Most runs	Matt Renshaw (144)	Tom Banton (190)
Most wickets	Mahli Beardman (6)	Gus Atkinson (6)
- Player of the series: Tom Banton (Eng)

Twenty20 International series

The England cricket team is touring Australia in November 2026 to play three One Day International (ODI) and five Twenty20 International (T20I) matches. They will return in March 2027 to play one-off day/night Test match against Australia cricket team. The match will be a part of celebration of 150th anniversary of Test cricket and will be a day-night Test match. The match will be played at the Melbourne Cricket Ground.

Following criticism over their preparation for the previous Ashes series in Australia, England also currently intend to play warm-up matches against local teams ahead of 150th Anniversary Test though any opponents have not yet been confirmed.

England won the 3-match ODI series by 2–1, making a comeback after losing the 1st ODI.

== Squads ==
Australia		England	
ODIs	T20Is	ODIs	T20Is
Mitchell Marsh (c); Xavier Bartlett; Mahli Beardman; Alex Carey; Cooper Connolly; Jack Edwards; Cameron Green; Travis Head; Josh Inglis; Spencer Johnson; Riley Meredith (Note: Only for the 2nd and 3rd ODIs); Ollie Peake; Matt Renshaw; Liam Scott; Adam Zampa	Mitchell Marsh (c); ~~Xavier Bartlett~~; ~~Mahli Beardman~~; Nikhil Chaudhary; Tim David; Joel Davies; Ben Dwarshuis; Jack Edwards; ~~Nathan Ellis~~; Jake Fraser-McGurk; Sam Harper; Spencer Johnson; Riley Meredith; Mitch Owen; Lachlan Shaw; Billy Stanlake; Henry Thornton; Adam Zampa	Harry Brook (c); Jofra Archer; Gus Atkinson; Sonny Baker; Tom Banton; ~~Jacob Bethell~~; James Coles; Jordan Cox (wk); Henry Crocombe; Sam Curran; Liam Dawson; Ben Duckett; Eddie Jack; Will Jacks; Jamie Overton; Adil Rashid; Joe Root; ~~Josh Tongue~~	Harry Brook (c); Tom Banton; ~~Jacob Bethell~~; James Coles; Jordan Cox (wk); Henry Crocombe; Sam Curran; Scott Currie (Note: Only for 5th T20I); Liam Dawson; Aneurin Donald; Eddie Jack; Will Jacks; Jamie Overton; Adil Rashid; Thomas Rew; Phil Salt; Luke Wood

On 7 November 2026, Josh Tongue was ruled out of the ODI series due to toe injury. On 11 November, Jacob Bethell was ruled out of the tour due to a reoccurrence of a knee injury, with James Coles and Eddie Jack added to the ODI squad. On 15 November, Riley Meredith was added to the ODI squad ahead of the second match. Nathan Ellis was ruled out of the T20I series due to side strain injury and was replaced by Ben Dwarshuis. Riley Meredith and Henry Thornton were added to the T20I squad on 19 November. Xavier Bartlett and Mahli Beardman were then ruled out of the T20I series due to a knee and quad injury, respectively, with Billy Stanlake added on 20 November.

== Tour matches ==
=== Western Australia v England ===
7 November 2026
11:30
Scorecard

England; 251 (48.0 overs)	v	Western Australia; 159 (32.3 overs)
Ben Duckett 59 (66); Brody Couch 4/47 (9.0 overs)		Corey Wasley 41 (34); Adil Rashid 4/35 (7.3 overs)

England won by 92 runs
WACA Ground, Perth
Umpires: Shawn Craig and Ahmad Khan
Player of the match: Ben Duckett (Eng)

- England won the toss and elected to bat.
- 12 players per side (11 batting, 11 fielding)

== ODI series ==
=== 1st ODI ===
13 November 2026
11:30 (D/N)
Scorecard

England; 131 (33.4 overs)	v	Australia; 3/132 (23.3 overs)
Gus Atkinson 29* (32); Mahli Beardman 6/24 (7.4 overs)		Mitchell Marsh 50 (30); Jamie Overton 1/35 (4.3 overs)

Australia won by 7 wickets
Perth Stadium, Perth
Umpires: Sam Nogajski (Aus) and Sharfuddoula (Ban)
Player of the match: Mahli Beardman (Aus)

- Australia won the toss and elected to field.
- Joe Root (Eng) played in his 200th ODI.
- Mahli Beardman's 6/24 represent the best bowling figures by an Australian on ODI debut, surpassing Tony Dodemaide's 5/21 in 1988.

=== 2nd ODI ===
15 November 2026
14:00 (D/N)
Scorecard

England; 6/355 (50 overs)	v	Australia; 220 (44.3 overs)
Tom Banton 121 (99); Xavier Bartlett 3/72 (10 overs)		Cameron Green 64 (82); Gus Atkinson 4/28 (10 overs)

England won by 135 runs
Adelaide Oval, Adelaide
Umpires: Chris Gaffaney (NZ) and Donovan Koch (Aus)
Player of the match: Tom Banton (Eng)

- Australia won the toss and elected to field.

=== 3rd ODI ===
18 November 2026
14:30 (D/N)
Scorecard

England; 328 (48.3 overs)	v	Australia; 231 (46.5 overs)
Ben Duckett 133 (115); Jack Edwards 4/31 (5.3 overs)		Matt Renshaw 55 (70); Sonny Baker 4/45 (10 overs)

England won by 97 runs
Bellerive Oval, Hobart
Umpires: Sharfuddoula (Ban) and Shaun Haig (NZ)
Player of the match: Ben Duckett (Eng)

- England won the toss and elected to bat.

== T20I series ==
=== 1st T20I ===
21 November 2026
19:15 (N)
Scorecard

England; 9/187 (20 overs)	v	Australia; 7/191 (19.5 overs)
Harry Brook 65 (28); Nikhil Chaudhary 2/21 (4 overs)		Nikhil Chaudhary 66 (38); Will Jacks 2/29 (2.4 overs)

Australia won by 3 wickets
Melbourne Cricket Ground, Melbourne
Umpires: Donovan Koch (Aus) and Sam Nogajski (Aus)
Player of the match: Nikhil Chaudhary (Aus)

- Australia won the toss and elected to field.
- Sam Harper, Lachlan Shaw (Aus) and Henry Crocombe (Eng) all made their T20I debuts.

=== 2nd T20I ===
24 November 2026
18:15 (N)
Scorecard

Australia	v	England

Carrara Stadium, Gold Coast

=== 3rd T20I ===
27 November 2026
18:15 (N)
Scorecard

Australia	v	England

The Gabba, Brisbane

=== 4th T20I ===
29 November 2026
19:15 (N)
Scorecard

Australia	v	England

Sydney Cricket Ground, Sydney

=== 5th T20I ===
2 December 2026
19:15 (N)
Scorecard

Australia	v	England

Manuka Oval, Canberra

== Only Test ==
11–15 March 2027 (D/N)
Scorecard

Australia	v	England

Melbourne Cricket Ground, Melbourne
