= Mahli Beardman =

Australian cricketer (born 2005)

Personal information
- Born: 31 August 2005 (age 21); Dunsborough, Western Australia, Australia
- Batting: Right-handed
- Bowling: Right-arm fast-medium
- Role: Bowler

International information
- National side: Australia (2026)
- ODI debut (cap 255): 13 November 2026 v England
- Last ODI: 18 November 2026 v England
- ODI shirt no.: 40
- Only T20I (cap 114): 29 January 2026 v Pakistan
- T20I shirt no.: 40

Domestic team information
- Years: Team
- 2023/24–present: Western Australia (squad no. 4)
- 2024/25–present: Perth Scorchers (squad no. 4)

Career statistics
Competition	ODI	T20I	LA	T20
Matches	2	1	13	14
Runs scored	13	–	33	2
Batting average	–	–	6.60	2.00
100s/50s	–/–	–/–	0/0	0/0
Top score	13*	–	13*	2
Balls bowled	94	24	569	270
Wickets	6	2	27	18
Bowling average	13.00	16.50	21.40	20.00
5 wickets in innings	1	0	1	0
10 wickets in match	0	0	0	0
Best bowling	6/24	2/33	6/24	3/17
Catches/stumpings	2/–	0/–	6/–	4/–
- Source: ESPNcricinfo, 18 November 2026

Mahli Beardman (born 31 August 2005) is an Australian cricketer who plays for Western Australia and the Perth Scorchers. A fast bowler, Beardman represented Australia at under-19 level, and was the player of the match in their 2024 Under-19 Cricket World Cup final victory.

== Playing style ==
Beardman is a fast bowler. He took up this style of bowling as a child after watching Mitchell Johnson bowling in the 2013–14 Ashes series, and was mentored by former Australian Test bowler Dennis Lillee from when he was a teenager. He can bowl over 140 km/h.

== Career ==
=== Junior cricket ===
Born in Dunsborough and raised in Margaret River, Beardman was first spotted as a 10 year old playing cricket in Cowaramup before moving to Dampier for a two-year stint where the Western Australian Cricket Association first noticed his talent. He then moved to Perth and attended Aquinas College and at age 15, Beardman came to be coached and mentored by Australia bowling great Dennis Lillee.

Beardman gained the attention of the national cricket team in 2022. In November, he was invited to train with the senior Australian cricket team as they prepared to play a Test match against the West Indies in Perth, then in December he was called up to the Australia national under-19 cricket team for the first time in a series of matches against England.

=== Professional and international career ===
On 4 November 2023, Beardman made his List-A cricket debut for Western Australia against New South Wales. His first wicket was Moises Henriques, caught at mid-on after the ball had deflected from the non-striker's helmet. He didn't play another match for Western Australia during the regular season of the 2023–24 Marsh Cup. Later in the season, he featured as Australia won the 2024 Under-19 Cricket World Cup in South Africa. He was named player of the match in the final after taking 3–15 against India under-19s. He returned to Western Australia's squad for the final of the Marsh Cup, but did not play the match. At the end of the season, in April 2024, he was given a rookie contract by Western Australia. In August 2024, he also signed a contract with the Perth Scorchers for the 2024–25 season.

In September 2024, despite only having played one List A match in his career, Beardman was called up as a reserve player for the senior Australia squad ahead of their five-match ODI series in England. He was brought into the squad as injury cover, as several pace bowlers had been ruled out of the series with injuries, but was not required to play in the series. He made his debut in the Big Bash League for the Perth Scorchers against the Sydney Thunder on 13 January 2025, and in April 2025 was upgraded to a senior contract with Western Australia.

Beardman experienced stress fractures over the 2025 winter, which ruled him out of some early matches in the 2025–26 One-Day Cup. After his return from injury, in October 2025, he was again called up to the Australian national squad for their Twenty20 series against India. On 20 January 2026, Beardman took 3-20, including the wicket of Steve Smith, as Perth Scorchers secured a place in the final of the 2025-26 Big Bash League season with a win against Sydney Sixers.

In January 2026, Beardman was selected in the Australian squad for the three-match T20I series in Pakistan. He made his debut in the first match of the series, taking two wickets. Having played for Australia A on a 2026 tour of India, in November 2026 Beardman was recalled to the Australia limited-overs squads for a home series against England.

In his first One Day International for Australia on 13 Nov 2026, he set a record for the best figures for an Australian on ODI debut taking six wickets for 24 runs against England, only the second time an Australian had taken five wickets in their ODI debut.
