= Uvais Karnain =

Sri Lankan cricketer

Personal information
- Full name: Shaul Hameed Uvais Karnain
- Born: 11 August 1962 (age 64); Colombo
- Batting: Right-handed
- Bowling: Right-arm medium

International information
- National side: Sri Lanka (1984–1990)
- ODI debut (cap 38): 31 March 1984 v New Zealand
- Last ODI: 29 April 1990 v Pakistan

Career statistics
Competition	ODI
Matches	19
Runs scored	229
Batting average	19.08
100s/50s	0/0
Top score	41*
Balls bowled	105.5
Wickets	16
Bowling average	31.56
5 wickets in innings	1
10 wickets in match	0
Best bowling	5/26
Catches/stumpings	1/–
- Source: ESPNcricinfo, 1 May 2006

Shaul Hameed Uvais Karnain (born 11 August 1962) is a Sri Lankan former Sri Lankan cricketer who played 19 One Day Internationals (ODI) between 1984 and 1990. Making his ODI debut in 1984 against New Zealand, he took a five-wicket haul, thus becoming the first debutant to do so in ODIs. Karnain started playing cricket at Isipathana College, Colombo.

== Domestic career ==
Born in Colombo, Sri Lanka, Karnain started playing first-class cricket for Moors Sports Club and Nondescripts Cricket Club during the 1982–83 season.

== International career ==
A right-arm medium-fast bowler, he made his ODI debut in March 1984 against New Zealand at the Tyronne Fernando Stadium, Moratuwa. Batting first, Sri Lanka was struggling at 81 runs for the loss of 6 wickets when Karnain joined Arjuna Ranatunga and scored 28 runs off 24 balls. In the second innings, he took 5 wickets for 26 runs as New Zealand was bowled out for 116 runs. In the event, he became the first player to take a five-wicket haul on ODI debut. His performance with both bat and ball ensured Sri Lanka's victory and earned him a man of the match award. The Wisden Cricketers' Almanack described his performance as a "superb debut".

Karnain was then selected for the World Series Cricket and the World Championship of Cricket, both during the 1984–85 season in Australia. In nine matches that he played in the World Series Cricket, he scored 173 runs at an average of 43.25. Although his performance with the bat earned him a good repute, his performance with the ball was criticized as he conceded a lot many runs in both the tournaments. He was also a part of the Sri Lankan team that lost to India in the Wills Asia Cup in 1988. This was followed by the Austral-Asia Cup which was held in the United Arab Emirates in 1990. The series marked his last appearance in international cricket.

== After cricket ==
As of April 2015, Karnain was one of the members of the selection committee of the Sri Lanka women's national cricket team.
