= Tanveer Sangha =

Australian cricketer (born 2001)

Personal information
- Full name: Tanveer Singh Sangha
- Born: 26 November 2001 (age 24); Sydney, New South Wales, Australia
- Batting: Right-handed
- Bowling: Right-arm leg break
- Role: Bowler

International information
- National side: Australia (2023–)
- ODI debut (cap 241): 12 September 2023 v South Africa
- Last ODI: 2 May 2026 v Pakistan
- ODI shirt no.: 26
- T20I debut (cap 106): 30 August 2023 v South Africa
- Last T20I: 3 December 2023 v India
- T20I shirt no.: 26

Domestic team information
- Years: Team
- 2020/21–present: Sydney Thunder (squad no. 17)
- 2021/22–present: New South Wales
- 2022–2023: Birmingham Phoenix
- 2025: Los Angeles Knight Riders

Career statistics
Competition	ODI	T20I	FC	LA
Matches	6	7	20	33
Runs scored	6	2	163	114
Batting average	3.00	-	10.86	8.76
100s/50s	0/0	0/0	0/1	0/0
Top score	5*	2*	53	26*
Balls bowled	258	168	3,865	1,619
Wickets	4	10	52	49
Bowling average	63.25	24.90	38.21	31.26
5 wickets in innings	0	0	0	0
10 wickets in match	0	0	0	0
Best bowling	1/22	4/31	4/56	4/21
Catches/stumpings	0/–	1/–	6/–	8/–
- Source: ESPNcricinfo, 25 October 2026

Tanveer Singh Sangha (born 26 November 2001) is an Australian cricketer who represents Australia in ODI and T20I cricket as a right arm leg spin bowler. He plays for Sydney Thunder in the Big Bash League (BBL) and plays domestically for New South Wales.

He was Australia’s leading wicket taker at the 2020 Under-19 Cricket World Cup, claiming 15 wickets.

== Family and early life ==
Sangha's parents moved from Indian Punjab to Sydney in Australia in 1997. Tanveer was born in 2001, and growing up he played various sports including volleyball, rugby, and kabaddi. Though he showed promise in volleyball, he began playing cricket at the age of 10 at the encouragement of his school coach. He bowling pace, but his father encouraged him to spin bowling as a teenager to avoid shoulder injuries. Sangha attended East Hills Boys High School, the same high school as former Australian Test cricketers Steve Waugh and Mark Waugh.

== Junior cricket ==
Sangha represented Australia in cricket at under-16 level, playing in a series against a Pakistan under-16 team in Melbourne, when he was spotted by former international cricket Fawad Ahmed, who subsequently became his mentor. He impressed at a junior level, and was signed by the Sydney Thunder as a development player for the 2018–19 season.

After finishing school, Sangha began playing first grade cricket in Sydney as a 17-year-old in 2019. He had quick success at this level, taking a 6-wicket haul in his second match and another 5-wicket haul in his third, and in November 2019 he was signed to a senior contract with the Sydney Thunder for the first time. He continued to represent Australia at junior level, playing for the Australian under-19 team at the 2020 U19 World Cup in South Africa. He was Australia's leading wicket-taker at the tournament, taking 15 wickets with a bowling average of 11.46.

== Cricket career ==
Tanveer made his Big Bash League debut for the Sydney Thunder on 12 December 2020 against the Melbourne Stars. He had a successful first season in the competition, taking 21 wickets (the most of any spin bowler in the competition) with a bowling average of 16.66. In January 2021, he was named in Australia's Twenty20 International (T20I) squad for their series against New Zealand at the age of just 19. He became the second player of Indian origin (after Gurinder Sandhu) to make it to the national team, though he did not play during the series, with experienced spin bowler Adam Zampa and Ashton Agar preferred.

Sangha made his debuts for New South Wales in both first-class cricket and List A cricket in the 2020–21 season. He made his first-class debut in a Sheffield Shield match on 27 October 2021, taking three wickets, and his List A debut in a One-Day Cup match on 24 November 2021, taking four wickets. Sangha then spent time in the 2022 winter in the subcontinent, playing for Australia A on a tour of Sri Lanka, and then being sent by Cricket Australia to a spin bowling academy in Chennai.

Ahead of the 2022–23 season, after playing a warm-up match for New South Wales, scans revealed a stress fracture in Sangha's back. The injury meant Sangha could not play for the entire season. After he recovered, he spent the 2023 winter abroad. He first travelled to the United States to play for the Washington Freedom as a replacement for Sri Lankan spin bowler Wanindu Hasaranga, but he was not selected to play in any matches for the team. He then travelled again to the United Kingdom to play for the Birmingham Phoenix in The Hundred, where he played his first matches post-injury.

Despite a lack of professional cricket in the previous twelve months, Sangha was named in Australia's provisional squad for the 2023 Cricket World Cup in India, as well as their squad for a tour of South Africa which was used to prepare for the tournament. The tour consisted first of a Twenty20 International series followed by a One Day International series. Originally, Sangha was not part of Australia's squad for the Twenty20 matches, but their lead spin bowler Adam Zampa fell ill before the final match and Sangha was called in to replace him just a day after his arrival in the country. He made his debut for Australia on 30 August, taking four wickets for 31 runs in the match, the second-best bowling figures for an Australian on debut (after Michael Kasprowicz's 4 for 29). He made his One Day International debut later in the tour on 12 September. Sangha played a total of two One Day Internationals and seven Twenty20s for Australia in 2023, but was ultimately not included in Australia's final 15-player squad for the World Cup.

In 2025, Sangha played in a series for Australia A against India A, taking seven wickets in three one-day matches, and he returned to international cricket for Australia's Twenty20 series against India in October 2025, again replacing the unavailable Adam Zampa.
