= 150th Anniversary Test match =

2027 cricket match in Melbourne, Australia

Australia	England
(Australia)	(England)
- Date: 11–15 March 2027
- Venue: Melbourne Cricket Ground, Melbourne

The 150th Anniversary Test match is a cricket match that will be played at the Melbourne Cricket Ground between Australia and England on 11–15 March 2027. It will commemorate the 150th anniversary of the first Test match played between Australia and England in 1877. The Centenary Test commemorating the match was played in 1977.

The match will be a pink ball Test match under lights (day/night) and will not be part of an Ashes series.

== Only Test ==
11–15 March 2027 (D/N)
Scorecard

Australia	v	England

Melbourne Cricket Ground, Melbourne

== See also ==
- English cricket team in Australia in 2026–27
