= Australian cricket team in Pakistan in 2025–26 =

International cricket tour

	Pakistan	Australia
- Dates: 29 January – 1 February 2026
Captains	Salman Ali Agha	Mitchell Marsh (Note: Travis Head captained Australia in the 1st T20I.)

Twenty20 International series
- Results: Pakistan won the 3-match series 3–0
Most runs	Salman Ali Agha (120)	Cameron Green (93)
Most wickets	Mohammad Nawaz (7)	Adam Zampa (5)
- Player of the series: Salman Ali Agha (Pak)

The Australia cricket team toured Pakistan in January and February 2026 to play Pakistan cricket team. The tour consisted of three Twenty20 International (T20I) matches. The series was served as preparation for both teams ahead of the 2026 Men's T20 World Cup. In January 2026, Pakistan Cricket Board (PCB) confirmed the fixtures for the tour. All the matches were played at the Gaddafi Stadium in Lahore.

== Squads ==
Pakistan	Australia
Salman Ali Agha (c); Abrar Ahmed; Babar Azam; Faheem Ashraf; Fakhar Zaman; Khawaja Nafay (wk); Mohammad Nawaz; Salman Mirza; Mohammad Wasim Jnr; Naseem Shah; Sahibzada Farhan; Saim Ayub; Shaheen Shah Afridi; Shadab Khan; Usman Khan (wk); Usman Tariq	Mitchell Marsh (c); Travis Head (vc); Sean Abbott; Xavier Bartlett; Mahli Beardman; Cooper Connolly; Ben Dwarshuis; Jack Edwards; Cameron Green; Josh Inglis (wk); Matthew Kuhnemann; Mitchell Owen; Josh Philippe (wk); Matt Renshaw; Matthew Short; Marcus Stoinis; Adam Zampa

== T20I series ==
=== 1st T20I ===
29 January 2026
16:00 (D/N)
Scorecard

Pakistan; 168/8 (20 overs)	v	Australia; 146/8 (20 overs)
Saim Ayub 40 (22); Adam Zampa 4/24 (4 overs)		Cameron Green 36 (31); Abrar Ahmed 2/10 (4 overs)

Pakistan won by 22 runs
Gaddafi Stadium, Lahore
Umpires: Ahsan Raza (Pak) and Asif Yaqoob (Pak)
Player of the match: Saim Ayub (Pak)

- Pakistan won the toss and elected to bat.
- Mahli Beardman, Jack Edwards and Matt Renshaw (Aus) all made their T20I debuts.

=== 2nd T20I ===
31 January 2026
16:00 (D/N)
Scorecard

Pakistan; 198/5 (20 overs)	v	Australia; 108 (15.4 overs)
Salman Ali Agha 76 (40); Adam Zampa 1/27 (4 overs)		Cameron Green 35 (20); Abrar Ahmed 3/14 (3 overs)

Pakistan won by 90 runs
Gaddafi Stadium, Lahore
Umpires: Ahsan Raza (Pak) and Rashid Riaz (Pak)
Player of the match: Salman Ali Agha (Pak)

- Pakistan won the toss and elected to bat.

=== 3rd T20I ===
1 February 2026
16:00 (D/N)
Scorecard

Pakistan; 207/6 (20 overs)	v	Australia; 96 (16.5 overs)
Saim Ayub 56 (37); Ben Dwarshuis 2/39 (4 overs)		Marcus Stoinis 23 (22); Mohammad Nawaz 5/18 (4 overs)

Pakistan won by 111 runs
Gaddafi Stadium, Lahore
Umpires: Nasir Hussain (Pak) and Rashid Riaz (Pak)
Player of the match: Mohammad Nawaz (Pak)

- Pakistan won the toss and elected to bat.
- This was Australia's biggest margin of loss (in terms of runs) in T20Is.
