= Indian cricket team in Australia in 2025–26 =

International cricket tour

	Australia	India
- Dates: 19 October – 8 November 2025
Captains	Mitchell Marsh	Shubman Gill (ODIs); Suryakumar Yadav (T20Is)

One Day International series
- Results: Australia won the 3-match series 2–1
Most runs	Matthew Short (112)	Rohit Sharma (202)
Most wickets	Adam Zampa (4)	Harshit Rana (6)
- Player of the series: Rohit Sharma (Ind)

Twenty20 International series
- Results: India won the 5-match series 2–1
Most runs	Tim David (89)	Abhishek Sharma (163)
Most wickets	Nathan Ellis (9)	Varun Chakravarthy (5)
- Player of the series: Abhishek Sharma (Ind)

The Indian cricket team toured Australia in October and November 2025 to play the Australia cricket team. The tour consisted of three One Day International (ODI) and five Twenty20 Internationals (T20I) matches. In March 2025, the Cricket Australia (CA) confirmed the fixtures for the tour, as a part of the 2025 home international season.

== Squads ==
Australia		India	
ODIs	T20Is	ODIs	T20Is
Mitchell Marsh (c); Xavier Bartlett; Alex Carey (Note: Only for the 2nd and 3rd ODIs) (wk); Cooper Connolly; ~~Ben Dwarshuis~~; Jack Edwards (Note: Only for the 3rd ODI); Nathan Ellis; ~~Cameron Green~~; Josh Hazlewood; Travis Head; Josh Inglis (wk); Matthew Kuhnemann; ~~Marnus Labuschagne~~; Mitchell Owen; Josh Philippe (wk); Matt Renshaw; Matthew Short; Mitchell Starc; Adam Zampa	Mitchell Marsh (c); Sean Abbott (Note: Only for the 1st, 2nd and 3rd T20Is); Xavier Bartlett; Mahli Beardman (Note: Only for the 3rd, 4th and 5th T20Is); Tim David; Ben Dwarshuis (Note: Only for the 4th and 5th T20Is); Nathan Ellis; Josh Hazlewood (Note: Only for the 1st and 2nd T20Is); Travis Head; Josh Inglis (wk); Matthew Kuhnemann; Glenn Maxwell; Mitchell Owen; Josh Philippe (wk); Tanveer Sangha; Matthew Short; Marcus Stoinis; Adam Zampa	Shubhman Gill (c); Shreyas Iyer (vc); Yashasvi Jaiswal; Dhruv Jurel (wk); Virat Kohli; Prasidh Krishna; Axar Patel; KL Rahul (wk); Harshit Rana; Nitish Kumar Reddy; Rohit Sharma; Arshdeep Singh; Mohammed Siraj; Washington Sundar; Kuldeep Yadav	Suryakumar Yadav (c); Shubman Gill (vc); Jasprit Bumrah; Varun Chakaravarthy; Shivam Dube; Axar Patel; Harshit Rana; Nitish Kumar Reddy; Sanju Samson (wk); Abhishek Sharma; Jitesh Sharma (wk); Arshdeep Singh; Rinku Singh; Washington Sundar; Tilak Varma; Kuldeep Yadav

On 14 October, Josh Inglis (calf injury) and Adam Zampa (family reasons) were ruled out of the first ODI and were replaced by Matthew Kuhnemann and Josh Philippe. Alex Carey was released from the squad for the first ODI to play in the round two Sheffield Shield match for South Australia against Queensland as part of his preparation for the Ashes series. On 17 October, Cameron Green was ruled out of the ODI series due to side soreness and was replaced by Marnus Labuschagne. On 21 October, Ben Dwarshuis was ruled out of the ODI series due to calf strain. On 24 October, Marnus Labuschagne was released from the ODI squad, without playing either match, to play in the round three of Sheffield Shield match for Queensland against New South Wales as part of his preparation for the Ashes series and was replaced by Jack Edwards. Mahli Beardman, Glenn Maxwell and Josh Philippe were added to the T20I squad. On 27 October, Tanveer Sangha was added to the T20I squad. On 3 November, Travis Head was released from T20I squad to play fourth round of Sheffield Shield game.

On 29 October, Nitish Kumar Reddy was ruled out of first three T20I matches due to neck spasms. On 2 November, Kuldeep Yadav was released from T20I squad to prepare for Test series against South Africa and included in India A squad for second four day match against South Africa A.

== ODI series ==
=== 1st ODI ===
19 October 2025
11:30 (D/N)
Scorecard

India; 9/136 (26 overs)	v	Australia; 3/131 (21.1 overs)
KL Rahul 38 (31); Josh Hazlewood 2/20 (7 overs)		Mitchell Marsh 46* (52); Washington Sundar 1/14 (2 overs)

Australia won by 7 wickets (DLS method)
Perth Stadium, Perth
Umpires: Richard Kettleborough (Eng) and Sam Nogajski (Aus)
Player of the match: Mitchell Marsh (Aus)

- Australia won the toss and elected to field.
- The match was reduced to 26 overs per side due to rain.
- Australia were set a revised target of 131 runs from 26 overs due to rain.
- Shubman Gill captained India for the first time in ODIs.
- Mitchell Owen, Matt Renshaw (Aus) and Nitish Kumar Reddy (Ind) all made their ODI debuts.
- Rohit Sharma (Ind) played in his 500th international match.
- This was Australia's first ever ODI win at the venue.

=== 2nd ODI ===
23 October 2025
14:00 (D/N)
Scorecard

India; 9/264 (50 overs)	v	Australia; 8/265 (46.2 overs)
Rohit Sharma 73 (97); Adam Zampa 4/60 (10 overs)		Matthew Short 74 (78); Washington Sundar 2/37 (7 overs)

Australia won by 2 wickets
Adelaide Oval, Adelaide
Umpires: Sam Nogajski (Aus) and Allahudien Paleker (SA)
Player of the match: Adam Zampa (Aus)

- Australia won the toss and elected to field.

=== 3rd ODI ===
25 October 2025
14:30 (D/N)
Scorecard

Australia; 236 (46.4 overs)	v	India; 1/237 (38.3 overs)
Matt Renshaw 56 (58); Harshit Rana 4/39 (8.4 overs)		Rohit Sharma 121* (125); Josh Hazlewood 1/23 (6 overs)

India won by 9 wickets
Sydney Cricket Ground, Sydney
Umpires: Richard Kettleborough (Eng) and Wayne Knights (NZ)
Player of the match: Rohit Sharma (Ind)

- Australia won the toss and elected to bat.
- Travis Head (Aus) scored his 3,000th run in ODIs.
- Rohit Sharma (Ind) scores his 50th International century and 33rd in ODIs.
- Rohit Sharma (Ind) took his 100th catch in ODIs.
- Virat Kohli (Ind) surpassed Kumar Sangakkara to become the second highest run scorer ever in ODIs.

== T20I series ==
=== 1st T20I ===
29 October 2025
19:15 (N)
Scorecard

India; 1/97 (9.4 overs)	v	Australia
Suryakumar Yadav 39* (24); Nathan Ellis 1/25 (1.4 overs)

No result
Manuka Oval, Canberra
Umpires: Wayne Knights (NZ) and Sam Nogajski (Aus)

- Australia won the toss and elected to field.
- No further play was possible due to rain.
- Sanju Samson (Ind) played in 50th T20I match.

=== 2nd T20I ===
31 October 2025
19:15 (N)
Scorecard

India; 125 (18.4 overs)	v	Australia; 6/126 (13.2 overs)
Abhishek Sharma 68 (37); Josh Hazlewood 3/13 (4 overs)		Mitchell Marsh 46 (26); Varun Chakravarthy 2/23 (4 overs)

Australia won by 4 wickets
Melbourne Cricket Ground, Melbourne
Umpires: Shawn Craig (Aus) and Wayne Knights (NZ)
Player of the match: Josh Hazlewood (Aus)

- Australia won the toss and elected to field.

=== 3rd T20I ===
2 November 2025
19:15 (N)
Scorecard

Australia; 6/186 (20 overs)	v	India; 5/188 (18.3 overs)
Tim David 74 (38); Arshdeep Singh 3/35 (4 overs)		Washington Sundar 49* (23); Nathan Ellis 3/36 (4 overs)

India won by 5 wickets
Bellerive Oval, Hobart
Umpires: Phillip Gillespie (Aus) and Sam Nogajski (Aus)
Player of the match: Arshdeep Singh (Ind)

- India won the toss and elected to field.

=== 4th T20I ===
6 November 2025
18:15 (N)
Scorecard

India; 8/167 (20 overs)	v	Australia; 119 (18.2 overs)
Shubman Gill 46 (39); Nathan Ellis 3/21 (4 overs)		Mitchell Marsh 30 (24); Washington Sundar 3/3 (1.2 overs)

India won by 48 runs
Carrara Stadium, Gold Coast
Umpires: Phillip Gillespie (Aus) and Rod Tucker (Aus)
Player of the match: Axar Patel (Ind)

- Australia won the toss and elected to field.
- Washington Sundar (Ind) took his 50th wicket in T20Is.

=== 5th T20I ===
8 November 2025
18:15 (N)
Scorecard

India; 0/52 (4.5 overs)	v	Australia
Shubman Gill 29* (16)

No result
The Gabba, Brisbane
Umpires: Shawn Craig (Aus) and Rod Tucker (Aus)

- Australia won the toss and elected to field.
- No further play was possible due to rain.
- Abhishek Sharma (Ind) scored his 1,000th run in T20Is.
