= Side strain =

Medical condition

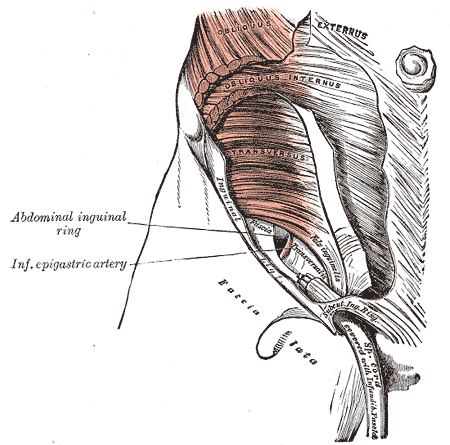
Transverse fascia

A side strain is a muscle strain caused by tearing of the transversalis fascia or the internal oblique muscle. When this occurs, stretching the muscle will be severely painful, making it difficult to move the arm, and the strain may later be marked by swelling or bruising.

The strain usually occurs due to the internal oblique muscle contracting suddenly from a stretched position. It may happen suddenly, or over time from regular repetitive activity. It is common in cricket players, and occurs on the opposite side of the arm that is used for bowling. The injury has also been reported in rowing, baseball and ice hockey and pool. The preferred treatment for a side strain is regular rest and inactivity on the affected muscle. With appropriate rest, regular activity on the muscle can occur between four and six weeks, though it may take longer.
