= List of cricketers who have taken five-wicket hauls on One Day International debut =

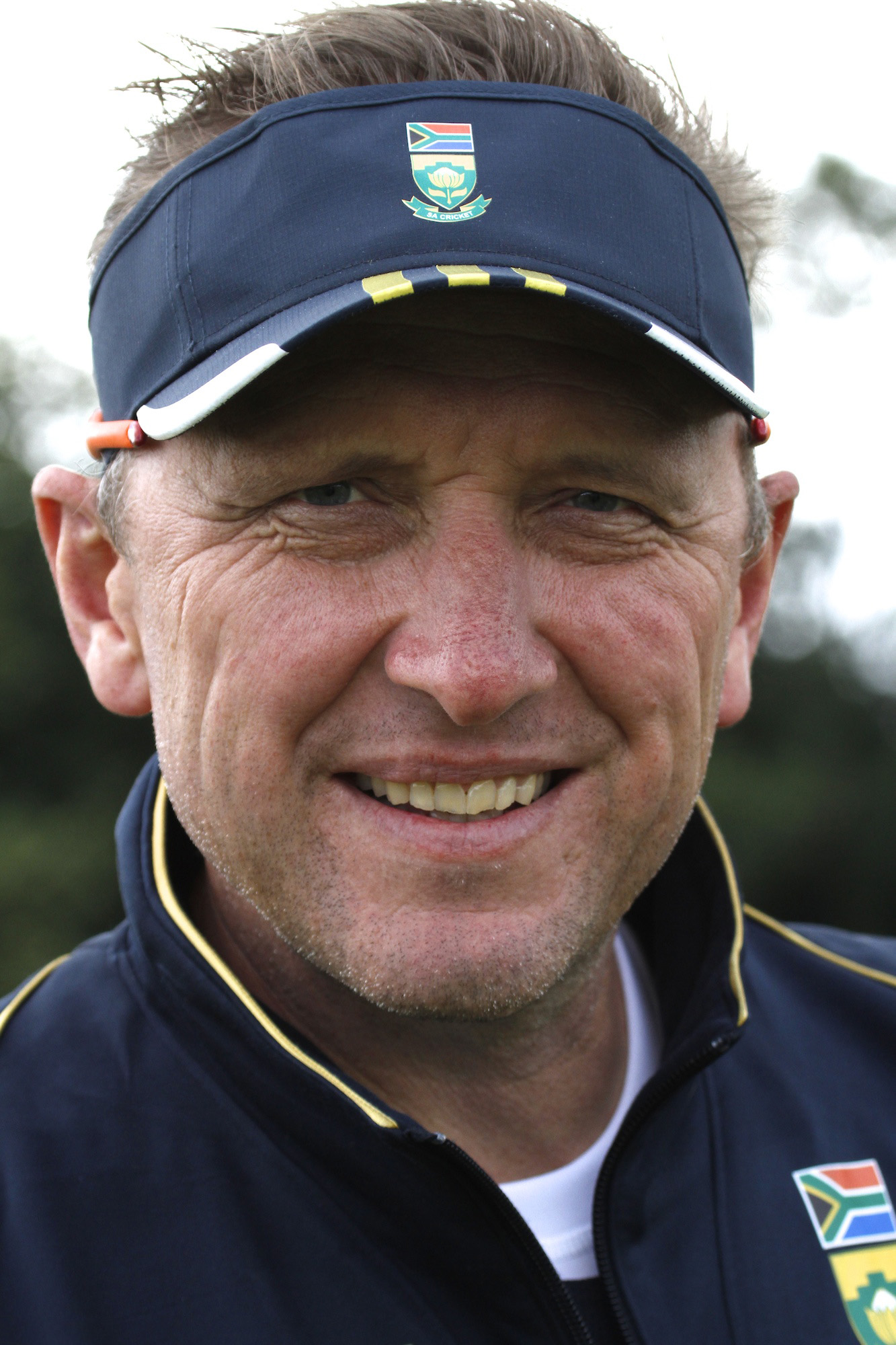
Allan Donald took a five-wicket haul for South Africa in its first ever ODI.

In cricket, a five-wicket haul (also known as a "five-for" or "fifer") refers to a bowler taking five or more wickets in a single innings. This is regarded as a significant achievement. As of November 2026, more than 5,000 ODIs have been played, however there have only been 18 occasions where a player achieved this feat on his ODI debut. Players from the nine of the twelve teams that have Full member status—Australia, Bangladesh, England, Ireland (Note: When the feat was achieved, Ireland were an Associate member), Pakistan, South Africa, Sri Lanka, West Indies and Zimbabwe—have taken five-wicket hauls on debut. Sri Lankans have performed this feat on three occasions, while the Bangladeshis and South Africa have two each. In addition, three players from Associate teams—Canada, Namibia and Scotland—have taken a five-wicket haul on debut. Afghanistan, India, and New Zealand are yet to have a debutant take a five-wicket haul.

Sri Lankan cricketer Uvais Karnain was the first to take a five-wicket haul on ODI debut; he took 5 wickets for 26 runs against New Zealand in March 1984. His figures were bettered by Australian cricketer Tony Dodemaide who took 5 wickets while conceding 21 runs in a match against Sri Lanka in January 1988. In 1991, Allan Donald became the first South African cricketer to take an ODI five-wicket haul for his team. (Note: It was South Africa's first ODI when they were re-admitted to international cricket following their ban in 1970 for the Apartheid policy.) Although South Africa lost the game by three wickets, Donald received a man of the match award. (Note: Donald shared the award with Sachin Tendulkar.) Canada cricketer Austin Codrington's tally of 5 wickets for 27 runs against Bangladesh in the group stage of the 2003 Cricket World Cup is the only five-wicket haul taken during the Cricket World Cup; his figures helped Canada secure a 60-run victory. Australian cricketer Mahli Beardman is the most recent debutant to take a five-wicket haul, with figures of 6 wickets for 24 runs against England. Of the 18 occasions a cricketer has taken a five-wicket haul on debut, his team has lost only 2 times.

== Key ==
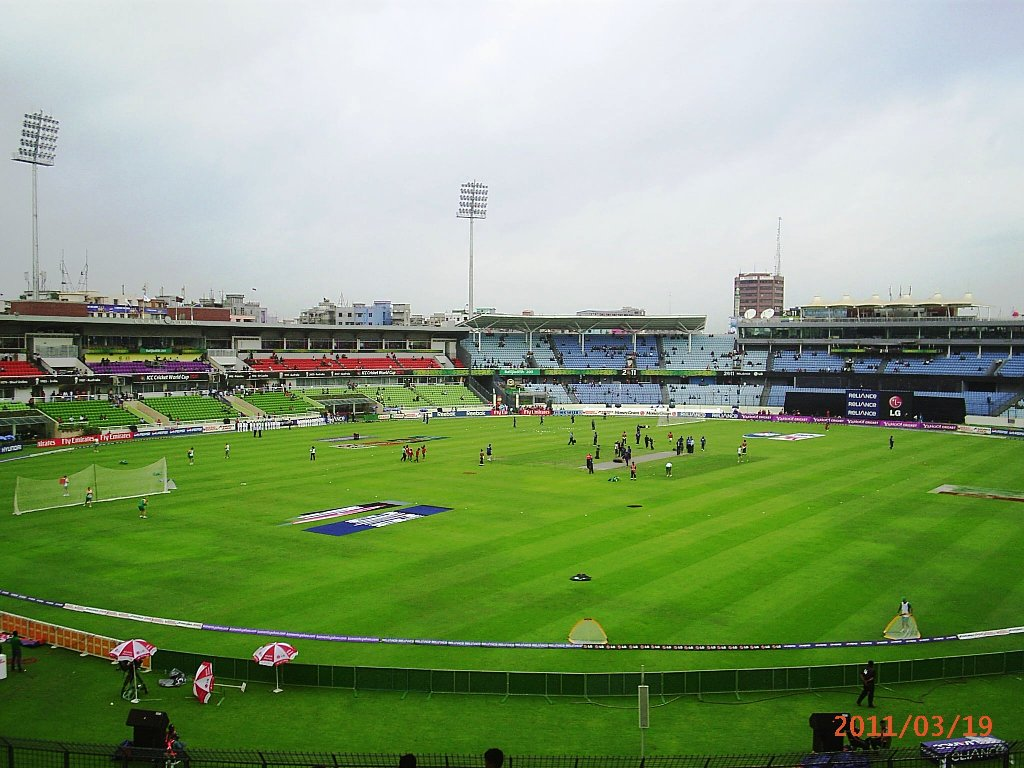
Four bowlers have taken a five-wicket haul on debut at the Sher-e-Bangla Stadium, Dhaka—the most at any ground.

Symbol	Meaning
Date	Date the match was held
Overs	Number of overs bowled in that innings
Runs	Runs conceded
Wkts	Number of wickets taken
Econ	Bowling economy rate (average runs per over)
Batsmen	The batsmen whose wickets were taken in the five-wicket haul
Result	The result for the team in that match
†	Bowler selected as "Man of the match"

== Five-wicket hauls ==
List of five-wicket hauls on ODI debut
No.	Bowler	Date	Ground	For	Against	Overs	Runs	Wkts	Econ	Batsmen	Result
1	Uvais Karnain †	31 March 1984	Tyronne Fernando Stadium, (Note: The ground has since been renamed as De Soysa Stadium.) Moratuwa, Sri Lanka	Sri Lanka	New Zealand	8.0	26	5	3.25	Geoff Howarth; Bruce Edgar; Lance Cairns; Jeff Crowe; Martin Crowe	Won
2	Tony Dodemaide	2 January 1988	WACA Ground, Perth, Australia	Australia	Sri Lanka	7.2	21	5	2.86	Asanka Gurusinha; Aravinda de Silva; Arjuna Ranatunga; Guy de Alwis; Graeme Labrooy	Won
3	Allan Donald †	10 November 1991	Eden Gardens, Calcutta, (Note: The city has since been renamed as Kolkata.) India	South Africa	India	8.4	29	5	3.34	Ravi Shastri; Sanjay Manjrekar; Navjot Sidhu; Sachin Tendulkar; Pravin Amre	Lost
4	Charitha Buddhika †	26 October 2001	Sharjah Cricket Association Stadium, Sharjah, United Arab Emirates	Sri Lanka	Zimbabwe	9.0	67	5	7.44	Dougie Marillier; Stuart Carlisle; Andy Flower; Gary Brent; Travis Friend	Won
5	Austin Codrington †	11 February 2003	Kingsmead Cricket Ground, Durban, South Africa	Canada	Bangladesh	9.0	27	5	3.00	Hannan Sarkar; Alok Kapali; Tapash Baisya; Mashrafe Mortaza; Mohammad Rafique	Won
6	Fidel Edwards †	29 November 2003	Harare Sports Club, Harare, Zimbabwe	West Indies	Zimbabwe	7.0	22	6	3.14	Barney Rogers; Vusi Sibanda; Craig Wishart; Mark Vermeulen; Stuart Matsikenyeri; Tatenda Taibu	Won
7	Brian Vitori †	12 August 2011	Harare Sports Club, Harare, Zimbabwe	Zimbabwe	Bangladesh	10.0	30	5	3.00	Tamim Iqbal; Shahriar Nafees; Mohammad Ashraful; Imrul Kayes; Shafiul Islam	Won
8	Taskin Ahmed	17 June 2014	Sher-e-Bangla National Cricket Stadium, Dhaka, Bangladesh	Bangladesh	India	8.0	28	5	3.50	Robin Uthappa; Ambati Rayudu; Cheteshwar Pujara; Stuart Binny; Amit Mishra	Lost
9	Craig Young	8 September 2014	(Republic of Ireland) Malahide Cricket Club Ground, Malahide, Ireland	Ireland	Scotland	10.0	46	5	4.60	Calum MacLeod; Hamish Gardiner; Preston Mommsen; Safyaan Sharif; Michael Leask	Won
10	Mustafizur Rahman †	18 June 2015	Sher-e-Bangla National Cricket Stadium, Dhaka, Bangladesh	Bangladesh	India	9.2	50	5	5.35	Rohit Sharma; Suresh Raina; Ravichandran Ashwin; Ajinkya Rahane; Ravindra Jadeja	Won
11	Kagiso Rabada (Note: Includes a hat-trick.) †	10 July 2015	Sher-e-Bangla National Cricket Stadium, Dhaka, Bangladesh	South Africa	Bangladesh	8.0	16	6	2.00	Tamim Iqbal; Soumya Sarkar; Litton Das; Mahmudullah Riyad; Mashrafe Mortaza; Jubair Hossain	Won
12	Dasun Shanaka	16 June 2016	(Republic of Ireland) Malahide Cricket Club Ground, Malahide, Ireland	Sri Lanka	Ireland	9.0	46	5	4.77	Paul Stirling; Ed Joyce; John Anderson; Stuart Poynter; Max Sorensen	Won
13	Jake Ball †	7 October 2016	Sher-e-Bangla National Cricket Stadium, Dhaka, Bangladesh	England	Bangladesh	9.5	51	5	5.19	Tamim Iqbal; Sabbir Rahman; Shakib Al Hasan; Mosaddek Hossain; Taskin Ahmed	Won
14	Jan Frylinck †	27 April 2019	Wanderers Cricket Ground, Windhoek, Namibia	Namibia	Oman	8	13	5	1.62	Khawar Ali; Aqib Ilyas; Zeeshan Maqsood; Suraj Kumar; Fayyaz Butt	Won
15	Charlie Cassell †	22 July 2024	Broughty Ferry, Dundee, Scotland	Scotland	Oman	5.4	21	7	3.70	Zeeshan Maqsood; Ayaan Khan; Khalid Kail; Shoaib Khan; Mehran Khan; Pratik Athavale; Bilal Khan	Won
16	Arafat Minhas	30 May 2026	Rawalpindi Cricket Stadium, Rawalpindi, Pakistan	Pakistan	Australia	10	32	5	3.20	Josh Inglis; Marnus Labuschagne; Cameron Green; Matthew Short; Nathan Ellis	Won
17	Lyle Robertson †	13 August 2026	Forthill, Dundee, Scotland	Scotland	Canada	10	52	6	5.20	Harsh Thaker; Saad Bin Zafar; Shivam Sharma; Shreyas Movva; Zahid Shirzad; Kaleem Sana	Won
18	Mahli Beardman	13 November 2026	Perth Stadium, Perth, Australia	Australia	England	7.4	24	6	3.13	Harry Brook; Joe Root; Jordan Cox; Sam Curran; Liam Dawson; Jofra Archer	Won
