= 2010–11 Ryobi One-Day Cup =

2010–11 National One Day Cup
- Administrator: Cricket Australia
- Cricket format: Limited overs cricket
- Tournament format: Double round-robin
- Champions: Victoria (5th title)
- Participants: 6
- Matches: 31
- Most runs: Brad Hodge (Victoria) (499)
- Most wickets: Brendan Drew (Tasmania) (19)

The 2010–11 Ryobi One-Day Cup was the 41st season of the National One Day Cup, the official List A domestic cricket in Australia. The season began on 6 October 2010 when Queensland Bulls played the Tasmanian Tigers.

The season marked the commencement of a new limited overs format which includes 45 overs per team of 12 players with a split innings of 20 and 25 overs.

== Table ==
Pos	Team	Pld	W	L	T	NR	Pts	NRR
1	Victorian Bushrangers	10	7	2	0	1	35	0.522
2	Tasmanian Tigers	10	5	4	0	1	28	0.360
3	New South Wales Blues	10	5	5	0	0	25	−0.139
4	Western Warriors	10	5	5	0	0	24	−0.232
5	Southern Redbacks	10	4	6	0	0	21	−0.159
6	Queensland Bulls	10	3	7	0	0	16	−0.238

== Fixture ==
=== October ===
6 October 2010
Scorecard

Tasmania; 9/252 (45 overs)	v	Queensland (H); 247 (45 overs)
Mark Cosgrove 69 (74); Nathan Rimmington 4/60 (12 overs)		Ryan Broad 83 (116); Brendan Drew 4/70 (12 overs)

Tasmania won by 5 runs
Brisbane Cricket Ground, Woolloongabba, Brisbane
Umpires: Ashley Barrow and Paul Reiffel
Player of the match: Nathan Rimmington (Qld)

- Queensland won the toss and elected to field.

8 October 2010
Scorecard

Victoria; 4/319 (45 overs)	v	Western Australia (H); 206 (34.4 overs)
Brad Hodge 134* (125); Michael Hogan 1/37 (7.4 overs)		Mitchell Marsh 44 (26); Shane Harwood 6/46 (7.4 overs)

Victoria won by 113 runs
Western Australia Cricket Association Ground, Perth
Umpires: Ian Lock and Mick Martell
Player of the match: Brad Hodge (Vic)

- Western Australia won the toss and elected to field.

9 October 2010
Scorecard

(H) South Australia; 9/232 (45 overs)	v	New South Wales; 199 (42.2 overs)
Michael Klinger 40 (46); Stuart Clark 4/51 (10 overs)		Nic Maddinson 54 (51); Gary Putland 4/41 (12 overs)

South Australia won by 33 runs
Adelaide Oval, Adelaide
Umpires: Simon Fry and Paul Wilson

- South Australia won the toss and elected to bat.

16 October 2010
Scorecard

(H) Queensland; 8/238 (45 overs)	v	Victoria; 8/240 (44 overs)
Chris Lynn 50 (70); Dirk Nannes 4/44 (12 overs)		Brad Hodge 140* (121); Chris Swan 3/51 (11 overs)

Victoria won by 2 wickets
Brisbane Cricket Ground, Woolloongabba, Brisbane
Umpires: Ashley Barrow and Bruce Oxenford
Player of the match: Brad Hodge (Vic)

- Queensland won the toss and elected to bat.

17 October 2010
Scorecard

Western Australia; 6/224 (45 overs)	v	New South Wales (H); 5/228 (42.2 overs)
Liam Davis 116* (126); Brett Lee 2/37 (11 overs)		Steve O'Keefe 70* (50); Brett Dorey 2/50 (10 overs)

New South Wales won by 5 wickets
Hurstville Oval, Sydney
Umpires: Gerald Abood and Simon Fry
Player of the match: Steve O'Keefe (NSW)

- Western Australia won the toss and elected to bat.

17 October 2010
Scorecard

Tasmania; 6/274 (45 overs)	v	South Australia (H); 183 (40 overs)
Ed Cowan 75 (94); Ben Edmondson 3/47 (8 overs)		Tom Cooper 56 (70); Xavier Doherty 3/20 (7 overs)

Tasmania won by 91 runs
Adelaide Oval, Adelaide
Umpires: Ian Lock and Mick Martell
Player of the match: George Bailey (Tas)

- South Australia won the toss and elected to field.

22 October 2010
Scorecard

Tasmania; 7/286 (45 overs)	v	New South Wales (H); 214 (42 overs)
Ed Cowan 131* (120); Brett Lee 2/74 (12 overs)		Phil Jaques 95 (103); Xavier Doherty 3/35 (10 overs)

Tasmania won by 72 runs
Sydney Cricket Ground, Sydney
Umpires: Paul Reiffel and Tony Ward

- Tasmania won the toss and elected to bat.

23 October 2010
Scorecard

(H) Victoria; 8/236 (45 overs)	v	Western Australia; 3/239 (43.3 overs)
Matthew Wade 101* (81); Michael Hogan 5/44 (12 overs)		Liam Davis 108 (125); Shane Harwood 2/51 (9.3 overs)

Western Australia won by 7 wickets
Melbourne Cricket Ground, Melbourne
Umpires: Geoff Joshua and John Ward
Player of the match: Liam Davis (WA)

- Western Australia won the toss and elected to field.

24 October 2010
Scorecard

South Australia; 6/258 (45 overs)	v	Queensland (H); 7/259 (44.5 overs)
Daniel Christian 100 (90); Cameron Gannon 3/68 (12 overs)		Chris Lynn 70 (73); Gary Putland 3/53 (10 overs)

Queensland won by 3 wickets
Riverway Stadium, Townsville
Umpires: Simon Fry and Bruce Oxenford
Player of the match: Chris Lynn (Qld)

- South Australia won the toss and elected to bat.

27 October 2010
Scorecard

(H) South Australia; 198 (44 overs)	v	Western Australia; 5/199 (39.2 overs)
Graham Manou 47* (57); Mitchell Marsh 3/37 (8 overs)		Adam Voges 81* (93); Aaron O'Brien 2/33 (10 overs)

Western Australia won by 5 wickets
Adelaide Oval, Adelaide
Umpires: Geoff Joshua and Bob Parry
Player of the match: Adam Voges (WA)

- Western Australia won the toss and elected to field.

29 October 2010
Scorecard

(H) Queensland; 158 (34.4 overs)	v	New South Wales; 4/162 (32.4 overs)
James Hopes 39 (34); Scott Coyte 3/31 (6 overs)		Nic Maddinson 39* (57); Nathan Rimmington 2/40 (9 overs)

New South Wales won by 6 wickets
Brisbane Cricket Ground, Woolloongabba, Brisbane
Umpires: Mick Martell and Damien Mealey
Player of the match: Stuart Clark (NSW)

- Queensland won the toss and elected to bat.

30 October 2010
Scorecard

(H) Victoria; 2/112 (20 overs)	v	Tasmania; 1/9 (4.1 overs)
Aaron Finch 42* (55); Xavier Doherty 1/21 (3 overs)		Tim Paine 7* (10); Shane Harwood 1/0 (2.1 overs)

No result
Melbourne Cricket Ground, Melbourne
Umpires: Ian Lock and John Ward

- Tasmania won the toss and elected to field.

=== November ===
6 November 2010
Scorecard

Queensland; 9/167 (45 overs)	v	Tasmania (H); 5/168 (31.3 overs)
Chris Hartley 27* (31); Brendan Drew 4/38 (12 overs)		Tim Paine 71 (72); James Hopes 2/11 (4 overs)

Tasmania won by 5 wickets
Bellerive Oval, Hobart
Umpires: Geoff Joshua and Bob Parry

- Queensland won the toss and elected to bat.

24 November 2010
Scorecard

(H) Victoria; 6/297 (45 overs)	v	Queensland; 2/140 (25 overs)
Brad Hodge 108 (98); Ryan Harris 4/64 (11 overs)		Ben Dunk 60 (69); Dirk Nannes 1/29 (7 overs)

Victoria won by 4 runs (D/L)
Melbourne Cricket Ground, Melbourne
Umpires: Ian Lock and Paul Wilson
Player of the match: Brad Hodge (Vic)

- Queensland won the toss and elected to field.

26 November 2010
Scorecard

New South Wales; 9/259 (45 overs)	v	Western Australia (H); 252 (44.4 overs)
Phillip Hughes 47 (57); Aaron Heal 3/52 (12 overs)		Shaun Marsh 132 (135); Brett Lee 5/47 (10.4 overs)

New South Wales won by 7 runs
Western Australia Cricket Association Ground, Perth
Umpires: Gerald Abood and Tony Ward
Player of the match: Brett Lee (NSW)

- New South Wales won the toss and elected to bat.

=== December ===
1 December 2010
Scorecard

(H) Tasmania; 222 (44.3 overs)	v	South Australia; 4/223 (42.2 overs)
Ed Cowan 62 (86); Chris Duval 3/33 (5.3 overs)		Callum Ferguson 101* (116); Brendan Drew 2/33 (6 overs)

South Australia won by 6 wickets
Bellerive Oval, Hobart
Umpires: Bob Parry and John Ward
Player of the match: Callum Ferguson (SA)

- Tasmania won the toss and elected to bat.

3 December 2010
Scorecard

Queensland; 9/211 (45 overs)	v	Western Australia (H); 5/216 (44.1 overs)
Chris Hartley 58 (100); Brett Dorey 4/53 (11 overs)		Adam Voges 85* (106); Nathan Rimmington 2/26 (9 overs)

Western Australia won by 5 wickets
Western Australia Cricket Association Ground, Perth
Umpires: Nathan Johnstone and Mick Martell
Player of the match: Adam Voges (WA)

- Queensland won the toss and elected to bat.

4 December 2010
Scorecard

(H) Tasmania; 8/189 (45 overs)	v	New South Wales; 3/190 (41.1 overs)
Ed Cowan 58 (86); Brett Lee 3/51 (12 overs)		Phillip Hughes 80* (114); James Faulkner 1/23 (6 overs)

New South Wales won by 7 wickets
West Park Oval, Burnie
Umpires: Sam Nogajski and Bob Parry
Player of the match: Phillip Hughes (NSW)

- New South Wales won the toss and elected to field.

4 December 2010
Scorecard

(H) Victoria; 198 (44.4 overs)	v	South Australia; 5/199 (41.5 overs)
David Hussey 45 (62); Daniel Christian 6/48 (12 overs)		Daniel Christian 86 (78); Glenn Maxwell 1/13 (1.5 overs)

South Australia won by 5 wickets
Geelong Cricket Ground, Geelong
Umpires: Paul Reiffel and Paul Wilson
Player of the match: Daniel Christian (SA)

- Victoria won the toss and elected to bat.

8 December 2010
Scorecard

(H) Queensland; 210 (45 overs)	v	Western Australia; 132 (34.5 overs)
Jason Floros 60 (78); Ryan Duffield 4/58 (12 overs)		Liam Davis 38 (52); Chris Swan 3/28 (7 overs)

Queensland won by 78 runs
Brisbane Cricket Ground, Woolloongabba, Brisbane
Umpires: Damien Mealey and Paul Reiffel
Player of the match: Jason Floros (Qld)

- Western Australia won the toss and elected to field.

12 December 2010
Scorecard

(H) New South Wales; 6/317 (45 overs)	v	South Australia; 8/314 (45 overs)
Usman Khawaja 121 (105); Ben Edmondson 3/70 (11 overs)		Michael Klinger 101 (119); Doug Bollinger 3/59 (10 overs)

New South Wales won by 3 runs
North Sydney Oval, Sydney
Umpires: Michael Kumutat and Mick Martell
Player of the match: Usman Khawaja (NSW)

- South Australia won the toss and elected to field.

15 December 2010
Scorecard

Victoria; 6/310 (45 overs)	v	South Australia (H); 234 (43.5 overs)
Rob Quiney 103 (67); Ben Edmondson 2/66 (10 overs)		Michael Klinger 73 (84); John Hastings 4/55 (12 overs)

Victoria won by 67 runs
Adelaide Oval, Adelaide
Umpires: Simon Fry and Bob Parry
Player of the match: Rob Quiney (Vic)

- Victoria won the toss and elected to bat.

22 December 2010
Scorecard

Western Australia; 6/245 (45 overs)	v	Tasmania (H); 6/246 (44.2 overs)
Shaun Marsh 52 (71); Luke Butterworth 2/38 (8 overs)		Ed Cowan 82 (79); Nathan Coulter-Nile 2/48 (8.2 overs)

Tasmania won by 4 wickets
Bellerive Oval, Hobart
Umpires: Ian Lock and Tony Ward
Player of the match: Ed Cowan (Tas)

- Tasmania won the toss and elected to field.

23 December 2010
Scorecard

(H) New South Wales; 225 (44.3 overs)	v	Victoria; 4/226 (39 overs)
Nathan Hauritz 51 (45); James Pattinson 2/42 (12 overs)		Matthew Wade 105 (110); Nathan Hauritz 2/53 (9 overs)

Victoria won by 6 wickets
Sydney Cricket Ground, Sydney
Umpires: Geoff Joshua and John Ward
Player of the match: Matthew Wade (Vic)

- New South Wales won the toss and elected to bat.

=== February ===
9 February 2011
Scorecard

(H) Tasmania; 6/258 (45 overs)	v	Victoria; 9/259 (45 overs)
Mark Cosgrove 120 (113); Peter Siddle 2/57 (11 overs)		Matthew Wade 67 (103); Brendan Drew 3/59 (12 overs)

Victoria won by 1 wicket
Bellerive Oval, Hobart
Umpires: Gerald Abood and Mick Martell
Player of the match: Glenn Maxwell (Vic)

- Tasmania won the toss and elected to bat.

13 February 2011
Scorecard

(H) New South Wales; 121 (34.2 overs)	v	Queensland; 4/119 (31 overs)
Peter Forrest 34 (66); James Hopes 4/16 (5.2 overs)		James Hopes 41 (56); Scott Coyte 1/15 (4 overs)

Queensland won by 6 wickets (D/L)
North Sydney Oval, Sydney
Umpires: John Ward and Paul Wilson
Player of the match: James Hopes (Qld)

- Queensland won the toss and elected to field.

16 February 2011
Scorecard

South Australia; 235 (44.2 overs)	v	Western Australia (H); 8/236 (45 overs)
James Smith 68 (79); Ryan Duffield 3/60 (10.2 overs)		Marcus North 104 (99); Jake Haberfield 3/44 (10 overs)

Western Australia won by 2 wickets
Western Australia Cricket Association Ground, Perth
Umpires: Ashley Barrow and Simon Fry
Player of the match: Marcus North (WA)

- Western Australia won the toss and elected to field.

19 February 2011
Scorecard

(H) South Australia; 9/217 (45 overs)	v	Queensland; 9/157 (45 overs)
Aiden Blizzard 58 (53); Brad Ipson 3/46 (12 overs)		Chris Hartley 34* (102); Kane Richardson 3/21 (9 overs)

South Australia won by 60 runs
Adelaide Oval, Adelaide
Umpires: Simon Fry and Tony Ward
Player of the match: Kane Richardson (SA)

- Queensland won the toss and elected to field.

19 February 2011
Scorecard

(H) Western Australia; 6/255 (45 overs)	v	Tasmania; 189 (39.4 overs)
Marcus North 100 (102); Ben Hilfenhaus 2/38 (11 overs)		James Faulkner 76 (80); Matt Johnston 4/28 (8.4 overs)

Western Australia won by 66 runs
Hands Memorial Oval, Bunbury
Umpires: Ian Lock and Paul Reiffel
Player of the match: Marcus North (WA)

- Tasmania won the toss and elected to field.

23 February 2011
Scorecard

(H) Victoria; 6/281 (45 overs)	v	New South Wales; 280 (44.4 overs)
Matthew Wade 101 (113); Moises Henriques 2/44 (8 overs)		Phillip Hughes 64 (79); Mark Cleary 2/44 (9 overs)

Victoria won by 1 run
Melbourne Cricket Ground, Melbourne
Umpires: AJ Barrow and P Wilson
Player of the match: Matthew Wade (Vic)

- Victoria won the toss and elected to bat.

== Final ==
27 February 2011
Scorecard

(H) Victoria; 194 (36.4 overs)	v	Tasmania; 109 (31.1 overs)
Brad Hodge 61 (69); James Faulkner 4/20 (5.4 overs)		Ed Cowan 32* (68); Dirk Nannes 3/29 (10 overs)

Victoria won by 84 runs
Melbourne Cricket Ground, Melbourne
Umpires: Simon Fry and Paul Reiffel
Player of the match: Dirk Nannes (Vic)

- Tasmania won the toss and elected to field.

== Statistics ==
=== Highest team totals ===
The following table lists the six highest team scores during this season.

Team	Total	Opponent	Ground
Victoria	4/319	Western Australia	Western Australia Cricket Association Ground, Perth
New South Wales	6/317	South Australia	North Sydney Oval, Sydney
South Australia	8/314	New South Wales	North Sydney Oval, Sydney
Victoria	6/301	South Australia	Adelaide Oval, Adelaide
Victoria	6/297	Queensland	Melbourne Cricket Ground, Melbourne
Tasmania	7/286	New South Wales	Sydney Cricket Ground, Sydney

Last Updated 31 December 2010.

=== Most runs ===
The top five highest run scorers (total runs) in the season are included in this table.

Player	Team	Runs	Inns	Avg	S/R	HS	100s	50s
Brad Hodge	Victoria	499	10	62.37	94.15	140*	3	1
Matthew Wade	Victoria	486	10	69.42	87.72	105	3	1
Ed Cowan	Tasmania	418	10	52.25	80.69	131*	1	4
Daniel Christian	South Australia	411	10	45.66	118.10	100	1	2
Aaron Finch	Victoria	409	10	45.44	83.81	84	0	3

Last Updated 25 February 2010.

=== Highest scores ===
This table contains the top five highest scores of the season made by a batsman in a single innings.

Player	Team	Score	Balls	4s	6s	Opponent	Ground
Brad Hodge	Victoria	140*	121	15	4	Queensland	Brisbane Cricket Ground, Woolloongabba, Brisbane
Brad Hodge	Victoria	134*	125	13	4	Western Australia	Western Australia Cricket Association Ground, Perth
Shaun Marsh	Western Australia	132	135	13	3	New South Wales	Western Australia Cricket Association Ground, Perth
Ed Cowan	Tasmania	131*	120	9	2	New South Wales	Sydney Cricket Ground, Sydney
Usman Khawaja	New South Wales	121	105	12	4	South Australia	North Sydney Oval, Sydney

Last Updated 31 December 2010.

=== Most wickets ===
The following table contains the five leading wicket-takers of the season.

Player	Team	Wkts	Mts	Ave	S/R	Econ	BBI
Ben Edmondson	South Australia	18	10	25.94	29.5	5.26	4/49
Daniel Christian	South Australia	17	10	26.58	24.4	6.51	6/48
Brendan Drew	Tasmania	16	10	26.68	30.8	5.19	4/38
Brett Lee	New South Wales	15	7	25.00	30.2	4.95	5/47
Michael Hogan	Western Australia	15	9	30.00	36.6	4.90	5/44

Last Updated 19 February 2010.

=== Best bowling figures ===
This table lists the top five players with the best bowling figures in the season.

Player	Team	Overs	Figures	Opponent	Ground
Shane Harwood	Victoria	7.4	6/46	Western Australia	Western Australia Cricket Association Ground, Perth
Daniel Christian	South Australia	12.0	6/48	Victoria	Geelong Cricket Ground, Geelong
Michael Hogan	Western Australia	12.0	5/44	Victoria	Melbourne Cricket Ground, Melbourne
Brett Lee	New South Wales	10.4	5/47	Western Australia	Western Australia Cricket Association Ground, Perth
James Hopes	Queensland	5.2	4/16	New South Wales	North Sydney Oval, Sydney

Last Updated 18 February 2010.
