= 2010–11 Sheffield Shield season =

Australian cricket tournament

2010–11 Sheffield Shield
- Administrator: Cricket Australia
- Cricket format: First-class
- Tournament format: Double round-robin
- Champions: Tasmania (2nd title)
- Participants: 6
- Matches: 30, plus final
- Player of the series: James Hopes (Queensland)
- Most runs: Mark Cosgrove (Tasmania) – 762 runs
- Most wickets: Luke Butterworth (Tasmania) – 45 wickets

The 2010–11 Sheffield Shield season was the 109th season of the Sheffield Shield, the first-class Australian domestic cricket competition. The season began on 8 October 2010, and ended on 21 March 2011 at the Bellerive Oval, Hobart, with the Tasmanian Tigers winning their second shield.

== Teams ==
Club	Home Ground	Captain
New South Wales Blues	Sydney Cricket Ground	Simon Katich
Queensland Bulls	Brisbane Cricket Ground	James Hopes
Southern Redbacks	Adelaide Oval	Michael Klinger
Tasmanian Tigers	Bellerive Oval	George Bailey
Victorian Bushrangers	Melbourne Cricket Ground	Cameron White
Western Warriors	WACA Ground	Marcus North

== Table ==
The top two teams after each round is played will compete for the Sheffield Shield final. The match will be contested at the home ground of the side that finishes first. In the result of a draw, the team that finished on top of the ladder, and hence hosting the match will be awarded the title. For an explanation of how points are awarded, see Sheffield Shield Points System.

Team	Pts	Pld	W	D	L	Quot	For		Against	
Tasmania	44	10	7	1	2	1.287	142	4024	172	3786
New South Wales	38	10	6	2	2	1.355	145	4916	180	4503
Queensland	26	10	4	3	3	1.001	146	3987	142	3873
Western Australia	22	10	3	2	5	0.901	171	4891	151	4795
Victoria	20	10	3	3	4	0.914	165	4976	161	5312
South Australia	12	10	1	1	8	0.722	187	4754	150	5279

Last Updated on 19 March 2011.

== Fixtures ==
=== October ===
8–11 October 2010
Scorecard

Tasmania	v	Queensland (H)
2/52 (31 overs); Ed Cowan 19 (69); Nathan Rimmington 1/18 (15)

Match drawn
Brisbane Cricket Ground, Woolloongabba, Brisbane
Umpires: Bruce Oxenford and Paul Reiffel

- Queensland won the toss and elected to field.

10–13 October 2010
Scorecard

Victoria	v	Western Australia (H)
529 (129.3 overs); Andrew McDonald 163 (116); Ryan Duffield 3/92 (27)		190 (58.3 overs); Luke Pomersbach 54 (62); Darren Pattinson 8/35 (15.3)
2/64 (13 overs); Aaron Finch 26 (17); Michael Hogan 1/13 (5)		400 (125.2 overs); Michael Swart 104 (143); Damien Wright 2/38 (16)

Victoria won by 8 wickets
Western Australia Cricket Association Ground, Perth
Umpires: Mick Martell and Bob Parry
Player of the match: Darren Pattinson (Vic)

- Western Australia won the toss and elected to field.

11–14 October 2010
Scorecard

New South Wales	v	South Australia (H)
6/529d (127 overs); Usman Khawaja 214 (294); Aaron O'Brien 2/107 (27)		255 (78 overs); Aiden Blizzard 96 (143); Moisés Henriques 4/53 (14.3)
0/6 (0.5 overs); Phil Jaques 5* (3); Daniel Christian 0/6 (0.5)		279 (89 overs); Chris Duval 87 (107); Steve O'Keefe 4/90 (31)

New South Wales won by 10 wickets
Adelaide Oval
Umpires: Simon Fry and Paul Wilson
Player of the match: Usman Khawaja (NSW)

- New South Wales won the toss and elected to bat.

25–28 October 2010
Scorecard

Tasmania	v	Victoria (H)
326 (99 overs); Mark Cosgrove 159 (194); Damien Wright 4/56 (20 overs)		276 (94.4 overs); Rob Quiney 62* (89); Xavier Doherty 5/83 (32 overs)
234 (92.2 overs); Travis Birt 68 (162); Peter Siddle 4/30 (15.2 overs)		261 (85 overs); Rob Quiney 102 (133); Luke Butterworth 5/41 (19 overs)

Tasmania won by 23 runs
Melbourne Cricket Ground
Umpires: Ian Lock and Paul Reiffel

- Tasmania won the toss and elected to bat.

29 October–1 November 2010
Scorecard

(H) South Australia	v	Western Australia
8/452d (110 overs); Aiden Blizzard 141* (153); Mitchell Johnson 3/120 (27 overs)		295 (86.5 overs); Shaun Marsh 137 (240); Aaron O'Brien 4/74 (26 overs)
		311/6 (102 overs); Marcus North 101 (201); Peter George 4/64 (23 overs)

Match drawn
Adelaide Oval
Umpires: Geoff Joshua and Paul Wilson
Player of the match: Callum Ferguson (SA)

- South Australia won the toss and elected to bat.

31 October–3 November 2010
Scorecard

New South Wales	v	Queensland (H)
262 (78.4 overs); Ben Rohrer 69 (140); Scott Walter 5/63 (16.4 overs)		75 (29.5 overs); Chris Lynn 11 (16); Mark Cameron 6/22 (11 overs)
		96 (33 overs); Scott Walter 15* (13); Mark Cameron 5/30 (99 overs)

New South Wales won by an innings and 91 runs
Brisbane Cricket Ground, Woolloongabba
Umpires: Ashley Barrow and Mick Martell
Player of the match: Mark Cameron (NSW)

- New South Wales won the toss and elected to bat.

=== November ===
10–13 November 2010
Scorecard

(H) Tasmania	v	Queensland
196 (75.2 overs); Mark Cosgrove 50 (78); Ryan Harris 5/72 (23 overs)		254 (81.4 overs); James Hopes 73 (87); Adam Maher 3/53 (21 overs)
271 (90.3 overs); Tim Paine 74 (138); Ryan Harris 4/68 (21.3 overs)		2/214 (75.2 overs); Lee Carseldine 68* (121); Adam Maher 1/42 (13 overs)

Queensland won by 8 wickets
Bellerive Oval, Hobart
Umpires: Geoff Joshua and Ian Lock
Player of the match: Ryan Harris (Qld)

- Queensland won the toss and elected to field.

10–13 November 2010
Scorecard

Victoria	v	New South Wales (H)
378 (99.4 overs); David Hussey 122 (162); Mark Cameron 3/91 (23 overs)		263 (93.1 overs); Michael Clarke 113 (244); Jon Holland 3/70 (23 overs)
8/275d (82 overs); Andrew McDonald 107* (174); Nathan Hauritz 3/67 (24 overs)		6/254 (94 overs); Brad Haddin 61* (138); Peter Siddle 2/42 (20 overs)

Match drawn
Sydney Cricket Ground, Sydney
Umpires: Ashley Barrow and Bob Parry
Player of the match: Andrew McDonald (Vic)

- Victoria won the toss and elected to bat.

17–20 November 2010
Scorecard

South Australia	v	Queensland (H)
223 (74.5 overs); Tom Cooper 63 (112); Chris Swan 6/69 (19.3 overs)		196 (53.1 overs); Ryan Broad 65 (106); Robert Cassell 6/53 (16.1 overs)
198 (58.1 overs); Graham Manou 116 (147); Chris Swan 7/75 (24.1 overs)		5/226 (52.2 overs); Chris Lynn 99 (102); Gary Putland 3/43 (16 overs)

Queensland won by 5 wickets
Allan Border Field, Brisbane
Umpires: Ashley Barrow and David Orchard
Player of the match: Chris Swan (Qld)

- Queensland won the toss and elected to field.

17–20 November 2010
Scorecard

Western Australia	v	Victoria (H)
368 (112 overs); Mitchell Johnson 121* (143); John Hastings 3/66 (28 overs)		141 (63 overs); Rob Quiney 54 (105); Mitchell Johnson 5/35 (16 overs)
3/222d (57.1 overs); Michael Hussey 118 (160); Damien Wright 2/42 (11 overs)		208 (103.1 overs); David Hussey 57 (152); Brett Dorey 3/33 (23 overs)

Western Australia won by 241 Runs
Melbourne Cricket Ground, Melbourne
Umpires: Tony Ward and John Ward
Player of the match: Mitchell Johnson (WA)

- Victoria won the toss and elected to field.

17–20 November 2010
Scorecard

(H) New South Wales	v	Tasmania
97 (40.2 overs); Phil Jaques 28 (67); James Faulkner 5/33 (12.2 overs)		125 (43.4 overs); Luke Butterworth 39 (83); Trent Copeland 6/51 (20.4 overs)
190 (74 overs); Simon Katich 36 (76); Jason Krejza 2/30 (10 overs)		9/167 (52.5 overs); Luke Butterworth 44* (44); Shane Watson 5/39 (14 overs)

Tasmania won by 1 wicket
Sydney Cricket Ground, Sydney
Umpires: Mick Martell and Paul Wilson
Player of the match: Luke Butterworth (Tas)

- New South Wales won the toss and elected to bat.

26–29 November 2010
Scorecard

(H) Tasmania	v	South Australia
251 (80.5 overs); Alex Doolan 68 (124); Peter George 4/65 (21.4 overs)		55 (32.5 overs); James Smith 17 (59); James Faulkner 5/5 (7 overs)
177 (51 overs); George Bailey 74 (104); Peter George 5/28 (15 overs)		416f/o (102.2 overs); Aiden Blizzard 115 (160); James Faulkner 3/92 (22 overs)

South Australia won by 43 Runs
Bellerive Oval, Hobart
Umpires: Bob Parry and John Ward
Player of the match: Daniel Christian (SA)

- Tasmania won the toss and elected to bat.

26–29 November 2010
Scorecard

Queensland	v	Victoria (H)
300 (109.1 overs); Chris Hartley 80 (190); Damien Wright 5/62 (32 overs)		9/152d (63.2 overs); David Hussey 38 (79); Ryan Harris 4/41 (21 overs)
2/190d (56 overs); Chris Lynn 77* (116); Damien Wright 1/12 (7 overs)		6/142 (55 overs); David Hussey 48 (65); Ryan Harris 2/27 (13 overs)

Match drawn
Melbourne Cricket Ground, Melbourne
Umpires: Barry Frost (NZ) and Ian Lock
Player of the match: Chris Swan (Qld)

- Victoria won the toss and elected to field.

28 November–1 December 2010
Scorecard

New South Wales	v	Western Australia (H)
291 (89.4 overs); Nic Maddinson 72 (153); Ryan Duffield 3/64 (21 overs)		205 (83.1 overs); Shaun Marsh 86 (199); Doug Bollinger 3/32 (20 overs)
278 (80 overs); Steve Smith 70 (113); Ryan Duffield 6/77 (19 overs)		165 (89.2 overs); Wes Robinson 39 (201); Nathan Hauritz 5/39 (27 overs)

New South Wales won by 199 Runs
Western Australia Cricket Association Ground, Perth
Umpires: Gerald Abood and Tony Ward
Player of the match: Nathan Hauritz (NSW)

- New South Wales won the toss and elected to bat.

=== December ===
7–10 December 2010
Scorecard

South Australia	v	New South Wales (H)
188 (68.5 overs); Michael Klinger 59 (168); Moises Henriques 4/13 (9 overs)		8/461d (148 overs); Nathan Hauritz 146 (337); Ben Edmondson 2/77 (28 overs)
9/362d (111.1 overs); Callum Ferguson 131 (250); Steve Smith 4/112 (26 overs)		2/91 (23.1 overs); Steve Smith 46* (67); Aaron O'Brien 1/23 (9 overs)

New South Wales won by 8 wickets
Sydney Cricket Ground, Sydney
Umpires: Ashley Barrow and Mick Martell
Player of the match: Nathan Hauritz (NSW)

- South Australia won the toss and elected to bat.

10–13 December 2010
Scorecard

Western Australia	v	Queensland (H)
331 (111.4 overs); Luke Ronchi 68 (77); Michael Neser 4/53 (20 overs)		150 (63.5 overs); Wade Townsend 47 (93); Michael Hogan 4/53 (19 overs)
		7/277 (111 overs); Chris Lynn 142* (290); Brett Dorey 3/62 (25 overs)

Match drawn
Brisbane Cricket Ground, Woolloongabba, Brisbane
Umpires: Gerald Abood and Paul Reiffel
Player of the match: Chris Lynn (Qld)

- Western Australia won the toss and elected to bat.

17–20 December 2010
Scorecard

Western Australia	v	Tasmania (H)
108 (31.4 overs); Ryan Duffield 29 (22); James Faulkner 3/15 (7 overs)		258 (74.3 overs); Mark Cosgrove 100 (153); Michael Hogan 6/70 (21.3 overs)
255 (92.4 overs); Wes Robinson 98 (175); Luke Butterworth 4/59 (21 overs)		0/106 (16.3 overs); Mark Cosgrove 86* (53)

Tasmania won by 10 wickets
Bellerive Oval, Hobart
Umpires: Ian Lock and Tony Ward
Player of the match: James Faulkner (Tas)

- Tasmania won the toss and elected to field.

17–20 December 2010
Scorecard

(H) South Australia	v	Victoria
168 (53.5 overs); Tom Cooper 53 (68); John Hastings 4/37 (14.5 overs)		306 (90.5 overs); Aaron Finch 62 (124); Ben Edmondson 5/93 (22.5 overs)
218 (73.5 overs); Tom Cooper 53 (112); Jon Holland 4/61 (23.5 overs)		2/81 (12 overs); Michael Hill 28 (33); Ben Edmondson 1/18 (3 overs)

Victoria won by 8 wickets
Adelaide Oval, Adelaide
Umpires: Simon Fry and Bob Parry
Player of the match: Jon Holland (Vic)

- South Australia won the toss and elected to bat.

18–21 December 2010
Scorecard

(H) New South Wales	v	Queensland
9/458d (139 runs); Nic Maddinson 137 (335); Chris Swan 4/86 (32.1 overs)		213 (74.3 overs); Andrew Robinson 77 (145); Steve O'Keefe 3/23 (9 overs)
3/168d (45 overs); Usman Khawaja 78* (110); Cameron Gannon 2/28 (11 overs)		280 (98.1 overs); Wade Townsend 80 (192); Doug Bollinger 3/64 (20 overs)

New South Wales won by 133 Runs
Blacktown Olympic Park Oval, Sydney
Umpires: Geoff Joshua and John Ward
Player of the match: Andrew Robinson (Qld)

- New South Wales won the toss and elected to bat.

=== February ===
10–13 February 2011
Scorecard

(H) Western Australia	v	South Australia
324 (82.2 overs); Luke Pomersbach 82 (130); Nathan Lyon 4/81 (26 overs)		271 (95.3 overs); Michael Klinger 100 (232); Ryan Duffield 4/56 (22 overs)
9/324d (105 overs); Tom Beaton 72* (117); Peter George 4/52 (22 overs)		248 (97.5 overs); Graham Manou 79 (211); Nathan Coulter-Nile 4/31 (20.5 overs)

Western Australia won by 129 runs
Western Australia Cricket Association Ground, Perth
Umpires: Ashley Barrow and Simon Fry
Player of the match: Nathan Coulter-Nile (WA)

- Western Australia won the toss and elected to bat.

11–14 February 2011
Scorecard

Victoria	v	Tasmania (H)
233 (65.4 overs); Aaron Finch 83 (124); Ben Hilfenhaus 4/44 (19 overs)		266 (98.3 overs); Ed Cowan 101 (270); Peter Siddle 4/66 (25.3 overs)
351 (114.4 overs); Rob Quiney 106 (180); Adam Maher 3/59 (19 overs)		5/319 (94.5 overs); George Bailey 160* (235); Jon Holland 2/59 (25 overs)

Tasmania won by 5 wickets
Bellerive Oval, Hobart
Umpires: Gerald Abood and Mick Martell
Player of the match: George Bailey (Tas)

- Tasmania won the toss and elected to field.

18–21 February 2011
Scorecard

New South Wales	v	Victoria (H)
416 (126.2 overs); Phil Jaques 129 (193); Peter Siddle 6/89 (29.2 overs)		263 (80 overs); Rob Quiney 66 (93); Beau Casson 4/56 (14 overs)
5/296d (79 overs); Phil Jaques 125 (167); Peter Siddle 2/50 (11 overs)		4/252 (89 overs); Matthew Wade 77* (123); Trent Copeland 2/40 (27 overs)

Match drawn
Melbourne Cricket Ground, Melbourne
Umpires: Tony Ward and Paul Wilson
Player of the match: Phil Jaques (NSW)

- New South Wales won the toss and elected to bat.

21–24 February 2011
Scorecard

Queensland	v	South Australia (H)
347 (89 overs); Joe Burns 140* (237); Kane Richardson 4/79 (17 overs)		294 (108.3 overs); Graham Manou 87 (172); Luke Feldman 4/66 (26.4 overs)
218 (75.2 overs); Chris Hartley 61 (132); Daniel Christian 3/20 (17.2 overs)		177 (62 overs); Daniel Harris 105 (178); James Hopes 6/50 (22 overs)

Queensland won by 94 runs
Adelaide Oval, Adelaide
Umpires: Geoff Joshua and John Ward
Player of the match: Joe Burns (Qld)

- Queensland won the toss and elected to bat.

21–24 February 2011
Scorecard

(H) Western Australia	v	Tasmania
160 (66.1 overs); Nathan Coulter-Nile 40 (87); Luke Butterworth 6/51 (15.1 overs)		426 (127.5 overs); Luke Butterworth 99 (169); Ryan Duffield 4/98 (26.5 overs)
137 (57.3 overs); Michael Hogan 24 (20); Ben Hilfenhaus 3/24 (11 overs)

Tasmania won by an innings and 129 runs
Western Australia Cricket Association Ground, Perth
Umpires: Johanes Cloete and Paul Reiffel
Player of the match: Luke Butterworth (Tas)

- Western Australia won the toss and elected to bat.

=== March ===
3–6 March 2011
Scoreboard

New South Wales	v	Tasmania (H)
74 (36.1 overs); Peter Nevill 24 (65); Adam Maher 5/19 (9.1 overs)		353 (105 overs); Nick Kruger 150 (242); Scott Coyte 3/82 (18 overs)
209 (72.1 overs); Steve O'Keefe 46 (78); Luke Butterworth 3/33 (13 overs)

Tasmania won by an innings and 70 runs
Bellerive Oval, Hobart
Umpires: Gerard Abood and Geoff Joshua
Player of the match: Nick Kruger (Tas)

- Tasmania won the toss and elected to field.

3–6 March 2011
Scoreboard

(H) Victoria	v	South Australia
345 (98.1 overs); Aaron Finch 84 (132); Ben Edmondson 3/51 (15.1 overs)		260 (75 overs); Daniel Harris 67 (93); Steve Gilmour 3/66 (13 overs)
6/294d (94.3 overs); Glenn Maxwell 103* (118); Kane Richardson 2/37 (15.3 overs)		194 (62.4 overs); Daniel Harris 96 (156); Peter Siddle 4/33 (16 overs)

Victoria won by 185 Runs
MCG, Melbourne
Umpires: Johanes Cloete and Bob Parry
Player of the match: Glenn Maxwell (Vic)

- South Australia won the toss and elected to field.

3–6 March 2011
Scoreboard

Queensland	v	Western Australia (H)
250 (85.4 overs); James Hopes 80 (104); Ryan Duffield 4/57 (20.4 overs)		397 (165.3 overs); Marcus Harris 157 (411); James Hopes 4/65 (40 overs)
273 (89.4 overs); James Hopes 68 (86); Nathan Coulter-Nile 557 (24 overs)		3/127 (33 overs); Wes Robinson 41 (28); James Hopes 1/10 (7 overs)

Western Australia won by 7 wickets
Western Australia Cricket Association Ground, Perth
Umpires: Ian Lock and John Ward
Player of the match: Marcus Harris (WA)

- Western Australia won the toss and elected to field.

10–13 March 2011
Scoreboard

Western Australia	v	New South Wales (H)
382 (127.2 overs); Marcus North 158 (321); Patrick Cummins 3/111 (33 overs)		9/322d (84.1 overs); David Warner 114 (169); Nathan Coulter-Nile 3/85 (20 overs)
190 (54.2 overs); Adam Voges 97* (138); Trent Copeland 4/61 (19.2 overs)		7/251 (90 overs); Phillip Hughes 115 (243); Nathan Coulter-Nile 3/75 (26 overs)

New South Wales won by 3 wickets
Sydney Cricket Ground, Sydney
Umpires: Gerard Abood and Paul Reiffel
Player of the match: Phillip Hughes (NSW)

- Western Australia won the toss and elected to bat.

10–13 March 2011
Scoreboard

Victoria	v	Queensland (H)
119 (35.3 overs); Glenn Maxwell 38 (41); Luke Feldman 6/37 (12 overs)		428 (122 overs); Chris Lynn 172 (287); James Pattinson 4/128 (32 overs)
306 (103.5 overs); Matthew Wade 113* (201); James Hopes 6/89 (27 overs)

Queensland won by an innings and 3 runs
Brisbane Cricket Ground, Woolloongabba, Brisbane
Umpires: Simon Fry and Mick Martell
Player of the match: Chris Lynn (Qld)

- Queensland won the toss and elected to field.

10–13 March 2011
Scoreboard

(H) South Australia	v	Tasmania
298 (115.3 overs); Graham Manou 82 (149); Adam Maher 3/40 (23 overs)		124 (45 overs); Mark Cosgrove 29 (38); Gary Putland 5/28 (12 overs)
198 (82.1 overs); Cullen Bailey 79 (204); Adam Maher 3/23 (13 overs)		6/373 (114.2 overs); Nick Kruger 147 (242); Cullen Bailey 2/98 (26.2 overs)

Tasmania won 4 wickets
Adelaide Oval, Adelaide
Umpires: Ian Lock and Tony Ward
Player of the match: Nick Kruger (Tas)

- South Australia won the toss and elected to bat.

== Final ==
17–21 March 2011
Scoreboard

New South Wales	v	Tasmania (H)
440 (121.5 overs); Phillip Hughes 136 (278); Xavier Doherty 3/67 (20.5 overs)		453 (178.2 overs); Ed Cowan 133 (329); Trent Copeland 4/124 (56.2 overs)
5/215d (63.5 overs); Phil Jaques 94 (156); Ben Hilfenhaus 2/32 (13 overs)		3/203 (74 overs); Alex Doolan 65* (177); Trent Copeland 1/53 (23 overs)

Tasmania won by 7 wickets
Bellerive Oval, Hobart
Umpires: Simon Fry and Paul Reiffel
Player of the match: Ed Cowan

- Tasmania won the toss and elected to field.

== Statistics ==
=== Most runs ===
Player	Team	Matches	Innings	Runs	Average	HS	100s	50s
Mark Cosgrove	Tasmania	11	18	806	53.73	159	2	3
Rob Quiney	Victoria	10	19	724	42.58	106	2	4
Phil Jaques	New South Wales	11	21	674	33.70	129	2	1
Aaron Finch	Victoria	10	20	645	33.94	84	0	5
Chris Lynn	Queensland	9	15	641	49.80	172	2	2

Updated to end of competition

=== Highest scores ===
Runs	Balls	Player	Team	Opponent	Ground
214	294	Usman Khawaja	New South Wales	South Australia	Adelaide Oval
172	287	Chris Lynn	Queensland	Victoria	Brisbane Cricket Ground, Woolloongabba, Brisbane
163	116	Andrew McDonald	Victoria	Western Australia	Western Australia Cricket Association Ground, Perth
160*	235	George Bailey	Tasmania	Victoria	Bellerive Oval, Hobart
159	194	Mark Cosgrove	Tasmania	Victoria	Melbourne Cricket Ground

Updated to end of competition

=== Most wickets ===
Player	Team	Matches	Overs	Wickets	Average	BBI	5W
Luke Butterworth	Tasmania	10	301.5	45	17.53	6/51	2
Trent Copeland	New South Wales	10	451.0	45	24.68	6/51	1
Adam Maher	Tasmania	9	265.0	37	18.21	5/14	1
James Faulkner	Tasmania	9	206.0	36	17.72	5/5	2
Ryan Duffield	Western Australia	7	230.1	33	22.90	6/77	1

Updated to end of competition

=== Best bowling ===
Figures	Overs	Player	Team	Opponent	Ground
8/35	15.3	Darren Pattinson	Victoria	Western Australia	Western Australia Cricket Association Ground, Perth
7/75	24.1	Chris Swan	Queensland	South Australia	Brisbane Cricket Ground, Woolloongabba, Brisbane
6/22	11.0	Mark Cameron	New South Wales	Queensland	Brisbane Cricket Ground, Woolloongabba, Brisbane
6/37	12.0	Luke Feldman	Queensland	Victoria	Brisbane Cricket Ground, Woolloongabba, Brisbane
6/50	22.0	James Hopes	Queensland	South Australia	Adelaide Oval

Updated to end of competition

== See also ==
- 2010–11 Australian cricket season
