= 2008–09 Ford Ranger One Day Cup season =

Ford Ranger One Day Cup 2008–09
- Administrator: Cricket Australia
- Cricket format: Limited overs cricket
- Tournament format: Double round-robin
- Champions: Queensland (8th title)
- Participants: 6
- Matches: 31
- Player of the series: Shane Harwood (Vic)
- Most runs: Lee Carseldine (Qld) (477)
- Most wickets: Shane Harwood (Vic) (24)

The 2008–09 Ford Ranger One Day Cup is the 39th season of official List A domestic cricket in Australia. The season began on 8 October 2008 when Western Australia played, New South Wales.

The final between the Victorian Bushrangers and the Queensland Bulls was played at the MCG on 22 February 2009.

== Points Table ==
The top two teams after each round was played competed in the Ford Ranger One Day Cup final. The match was contested at the home ground of the side that finished first. (For an explanation of how points are rewarded, see Ford Ranger One Day Cup – Points system).

Pos	Team	Pld	W	L	T	NR	BP	Pts	NRR
1	Victoria	10	7	3	0	0	2	30	0.100
2	Queensland	10	6	4	0	0	6	30	0.838
3	South Australia	10	5	5	0	0	3	23	0.048
4	Tasmania	10	4	5	1	0	2	20	0.078
5	Western Australia	10	4	6	0	0	0	16	−0.341
6	New South Wales	10	3	6	1	0	1	15	−0.646

== Teams ==
Club	Home Ground	Captain
New South Wales Blues	Sydney Cricket Ground	Simon Katich
Queensland Bulls	Brisbane Cricket Ground	Chris Simpson
Southern Redbacks	Adelaide Oval	Graham Manou
Tasmanian Tigers	Bellerive Oval	Daniel Marsh
Victorian Bushrangers	Melbourne Cricket Ground	Cameron White
Western Warriors	WACA Ground	Marcus North

== Fixture ==
=== October ===
8 October 2008
(scorecard)

New South Wales; 220/9 (50 overs)	v	Western Australia (H); 214 all out (49.2 overs)
Grant Lambert 48* (49); Brett Dorey 3/48 (10 ov)		Marcus North 95 (114); Nathan Hauritz 3/29 (10 ov)

New South Wales by 6 runs
WACA Ground, Perth (2142 att)
Umpires: Jeff Brookes & Bob Parry
Player of the match: Marcus North (WA)

12 October 2008
(scorecard)

(H) South Australia; 239/5 (50 overs)	v	Victoria; 240/2 (43.1 overs)
Daniel Harris 79 (100); Cameron Borgas 59 (76); Jon Holland 2/44 (10 ov)		Brad Hodge 102* (106); Chris Rogers 60 (69); Aaron O'Brien 1/44 (6 ov)

Victoria by 8 wickets
Adelaide Oval, Adelaide (1299 att)
Umpires: Simon Fry & Rod Tucker
Player of the match: Brad Hodge (VIC)

15 October 2008
(scorecard)

(H) Queensland; 205 all out (47.5 overs)	v	Tasmania; 60/1 (15.5 overs)
Clinton Perren 49 (73); Ben Hilfenhaus 3/29 (9 ov)		Dane Anderson 31* (55); Ryan Harris 1/26 (7 ov)

Tasmania by 14 runs (D/L)
Brisbane Cricket Ground, Brisbane (825 att)
Umpires: Bruce Oxenford & John Ward
Player of the match: Ben Hilfenhaus (TAS)

- Rain stopped play after 15.5 overs of the Tasmanian innings. No further play was possible

18 October 2008
(scorecard)

(H) Queensland; 287/6 (50.0 overs)	v	New South Wales; 136 all out (39.3 overs)
Lee Carseldine 126 (134); Andrew Symonds 73 (94); Aaron Bird 3/48 (10 ov)		Peter Forrest 41 (88); Ben Laughlin 6/23 (7 ov)

Queensland by 147 runs (D/L)
Cazaly's Stadium, Cairns (2970 att)
Umpires: Tim Laycock & Bruce Oxenford
Player of the match: Lee Carseldine (QLD)

- Rain stopped play after 10.2 overs of the New South Wales innings at 21/1. 1 over was lost and a revised target of 284 runs from 49 overs was set for NSW.

22 October 2008
(scorecard)

New South Wales; 261/9 (50.0 overs)	v	South Australia (H); 262/6 (49.5 overs)
Dominic Thornely 82 (92); Peter Forrest 57 (94); Shaun Tait 5/27 (10 ov)		Michael Klinger 79 (120); Daniel Harris 56 (73); Aaron Bird 4/48 (10 ov)

South Australia by 4 wickets
Adelaide Oval, Adelaide (1269 att)
Umpires: Simon Fry & Rod Tucker
Player of the match: Shaun Tait (SA)

24 October 2008
(scorecard)

Tasmania; 222/9 (45.0 overs)	v	Western Australia (H); 217/6 (42.2 overs)
Daniel Marsh 51 (60); Aaron Heal 3/39 (9 ov)		Theo Doropoulos 92 (75); Adam Voges 56 (78); Brett Geeves 2/35 (9 ov)

Western Australia by 4 wickets (D/L)
WACA Ground, Perth (1151 att)
Umpires: Paul Reiffel & Paul Wilson
Player of the match: Theo Doropoulos (WA)

- Rain stopped play with Tasmania 72/0 from 11 overs. 5 overs were lost
  Western's Australia's target was set at 227 runs from 45 overs under Duckworth-Lewis calculations
  Rain stopped play with Western Australia 211/5 from 42 overs. 2 overs were lost, setting Western Australia's target to 212 from 43 overs

26 October 2008
(scorecard)

(H) Queensland; 222/9 (50.0 overs)	v	Victoria; 227/3 (38.4 overs)
Nathan Reardon 54 (68); Clinton Perren 52 (96); Shane Harwood 2/18 (8 ov)		Rob Quiney 73 (63); David Hussey 50* (52); Chris Simpson 1/29 (6 ov)

Victoria by 7 wickets
Brisbane Cricket Ground, Brisbane (7535 att)
Umpires: Ian Lock & Norm McNamara
Player of the match: Rob Quiney (VIC)

=== November ===
1 November 2008
(scorecard)

(H) Tasmania; 286/8 (50.0 overs)	v	South Australia; 182 (46.4 overs)
George Bailey 79 (93); Shaun Tait 3/52 (10 ov)		Michael Klinger 59 (69); Brett Geeves 3/25 (10 ov)

Tasmania by 104 runs
Bellerive Oval, Hobart (1566 att)
Umpires: Steven John & Bruce Oxenford
Player of the match: George Bailey (TAS)

2 November 2008
(scorecard)

(H) New South Wales; 275/6 (50.0 overs)	v	Victoria; 277/5 (46.0 overs)
Dominic Thornely 108 (90); Andrew McDonald 2/57 (10 ov)		Rob Quiney 92 (85); Grant Lambert 2/54 (10 ov)

Victoria by 5 wickets
North Sydney Oval, Sydney (1793 att)
Umpires: Gerard Abood & Simon Fry
Player of the match: Rob Quiney (VIC)

5 November 2008
(scorecard)

Queensland; 140/7 (25.0 overs)	v	Western Australia (H); 157/5 (24.4 overs)
Lee Carseldine 54 (54); Trent Kelly 3/31 (5 ov)		Liam Davis 54 (59); Ryan Harris 2/28 (4.4 ov)

Western Australia by 5 wickets (D/L)
WACA Ground, Perth
Umpires: Andrew Craig & Ian Lock
Player of the match: Liam Davis (WA)

- Rain delayed (reduced to 32 overs per side)
  Rain stooped play with Queensland 1/17 from 4.5 overs. 1 over lost.
  Rain stopped play with Queensland 4/111 from 21.4 overs. The match was reduced to 28 overs.
  Rain stopped play with Queensland 4/135 from 24 overs. The match was reduced to 25 overs per side.

12 November 2008
(scorecard)

Tasmania; 290/8 (50.0 overs)	v	Victoria (H); 267 (48.2 overs)
Michael Dighton 95 (103); Shane Harwood 5/41 (10 ov)		Brad Hodge 103 (108); Mark Divin 4/56 (10 ov)

Tasmania by 23 runs
Melbourne Cricket Ground, Melbourne (1403 att)
Umpires: Geoff Joshua & Bob Parry
Player of the match: Shane Harwood (VIC)

16 November 2008
(scorecard)

(H) South Australia; 270/6 (50.0 overs)	v	Western Australia; 272/5 (47.2 overs)
Callum Ferguson 101 (83); Aaron Heal 2/34 (10 ov)		Adam Voges 104* (119); Gary Putland 2/58 (10 ov)

Western Australia by 5 wickets
Adelaide Oval, Adelaide (2651 att)
Umpires: Andy Collins & John Ward
Player of the match: Adam Voges (WA)

19 November 2008
(scorecard)

Queensland; 177 (47.2 overs)	v	New South Wales (H); 153 (44.3 overs)
Nathan Reardon 42 (50); Aaron Bird 5/26 (9 ov)		Steve Smith 48 (66); Chris Swan 3/28 (10 ov)

Queensland by 24 runs
Sydney Cricket Ground, Sydney (719 att)
Umpires: Terry Keel & Bruce Oxenford
Player of the match: Aaron Bird (NSW)

26 November 2008
(scorecard)

(H) Western Australia; 263/6 (50.0 overs)	v	Victoria; 265/6 (48.3 overs)
Luke Ronchi 80* (64); Shane Harwood 2/47 (10 ov)		Chris Rogers 75 (85); David Bandy 2/25 (3 ov)

Victoria by 4 wickets
WACA Ground, Perth
Umpires: Mick Martell & John Ward

29 November 2008
(scorecard)

Tasmania; 246 (43.0 overs)	v	New South Wales (H); 250/1 (34.4 overs)
Michael Dighton 69 (80); Dane Anderson 1/22 (3 ov)		David Warner 165* (112); Aaron Bird 4/61 (8 ov)

New South Wales by 9 wickets
Hurstville Oval, Sydney
Umpires: Gerard Abood & Rod Tucker
Player of the match: David Warner

- Rain Delayed. The match was reduced to 45 overs per side.

=== December ===
3 December 2008
(scorecard)

South Australia; 205 (45.3 overs)	v	Queensland (H); 163/3 (30.0 overs)
Younus Khan 60 (67); James Hopes 2/24 (8 ov)		James Hopes 75 (61); Mark Cleary 1/27 (6 ov)

Queensland by 59 runs (D/L)
Brisbane Cricket Ground, Brisbane
Umpires: Jeff Brookes & Paul Reiffel
Player of the match: James Hopes (QLD)

7 December 2008
(scorecard)

(H) Tasmania; 291/8 (50.0)	v	New South Wales; 291/7 (50.0)
Michael Dighton 87 (76); Doug Bollinger 3/39 (9 ov)		David Warner 97 (54); Brendan Drew 2/36 (10)

Match Tied
Bellerive Oval, Hobart
Umpires: Steven John & Bob Parry
Player of the match: David Warner (NSW)

10 December 2008
(scorecard)

Tasmania; 310/5 (50.0)	v	South Australia (H); 313/4 (48.4)
Travis Birt 94 (80); Daniel Christian 3/6 (10.0)		Michael Klinger 133* (128); Luke Butterworth 1/32 (4.0)

South Australia by 6 wickets
Adelaide Oval, Adelaide
Umpires: Mick Martell & John Ward
Player of the match: Michael Klinger (SA)

14 December 2008
(scorecard)

Queensland; 238/6 (50.0)	v	Tasmania (H); 197 (48.0)
Nathan Reardon 66 (63); Xavier Doherty 3/52 (9.0)		George Bailey 39 (85); Ben Laughlin 4/43 (10.0)

Queensland by 41 runs
Bellerive Oval, Hobart
Umpires: Brian Muir & Bruce Oxenford
Player of the match: Chris Swan (QLD)

16 December 2008
(scorecard)

South Australia; 285/5 (50.0)	v	New South Wales (H); 112 all out (30.3)
Tom Cooper 101 (108); Nathan Hauritz 2/49 (10.0)		David Warner 31 (20); Mark Cleary 3/29 (10.0)

South Australia by 173 runs
Sydney Cricket Ground, Sydney
Umpires: Rod Tucker & John Ward
Player of the match: Tom Cooper (NSW)

20 December 2008
(scorecard)

Western Australia; 198 all outs (47.3 overs)	v	Victoria (H); 199/6 (45.2)
Adam Voges 78 (108); Shane Harwood 3/32 (8.3 overs); Andrew McDonald 3/41 (8 overs)		Andrew McDonald 67 (82); David Hussey 66 (103); Brett Dorey 5/48 (9.2 overs)

Victoria by 4 wickets
Brisbane Cricket Ground, Brisbane
Umpires: Geoff Joshua & Ian Lock
Player of the match: Andrew McDonald (VIC)

23 December 2008
(scorecard)

Western Australia; 177/8 (44.0)	v	New South Wales (H); 137/5 (27.0)
Shaun Marsh 71 (123); Moisés Henriques 3/29 (10.0)		Phillip Hughes 53* (78); Paul Davis 2/21 (7.0)

New South Wales by 5 wickets (D/L)
Sydney Cricket Ground, Sydney
Umpires: Gerard Abood & Simon Taufel
Player of the match: Daniel Smith (NSW)

- Rain delayed the start of play until 2.35 pm. The match was reduced to 48 overs per side.
  Rain stopped play in the WA innings at 103/3 off 29.3 overs. 4 overs were lost.
  New South Wales were set a revised target of 184 runs from 44 overs under the Duckworth-Lewis system.
  Rain stopped play in the NSW innings at 33/2 from 13.3 overs. 15 overs lost. Revised target 137 runs from 29 overs.

=== January ===
28 January 2009
(scorecard)

(H) Queensland; 287/4 (50.0 overs)	v	Western Australia; 226 (47.4 overs)
Craig Simmons 61 (83); Ben Laughlin 3/41 (10 ov)		Lee Carseldine 122 (134); Steve Magoffin 1/46 (10 ov)

Queensland by 61 runs
Brisbane Cricket Ground, Brisbane
Umpires: Simon Fry & Bob Parry
Player of the match: Lee Carseldine (QLD)

=== February ===
4 February 2009
(scorecard)

South Australia; 200 (50.0 overs)	v	Victoria (H); 204/4 (37.3 overs)
Callum Ferguson 89 (116); Jake Haberfield 3/42 (6.3 ov)		Andrew McDonald 55 (74); Shane Harwood 4/33 (10 ov)

Victoria by 6 wickets
Melbourne Cricket Ground, Melbourne
Umpires: Tony Ward & John Ward
Player of the match: Shane Harwood (VIC)

7 February 2009
(scorecard)

(H) Tasmania; 197/8 (37.0 overs)	v	Victoria; 189/9 (37.0 overs)
Travis Birt 86 (66); Brett Geeves 2/42 (8 ov)		Chris Rogers 68 (82); Peter Siddle 4/27 (7 ov)

Tasmania by 14 runs (D/L)
Bellerive Oval, Hobart
Umpires: Simon Fry & Steven John
Player of the match: Travis Brit (Tas)

- Rain stopped play after 10.5 overs of the Tasmanian innings (Tasmania 35/1). 84 minutes and 11 overs play was lost and the match revised to 37 overs per side

8 February 2009
(scorecard)

(H) Western Australia; 148/10 (40.0 overs)	v	South Australia; 150/2 (36.4 overs)
Aaron Heal 50 (67); Brad Knowles 1/23 (8 ov); Aaron Heal 1/23 (5 ov)		Cameron Borgas 49 (101); Mark Cosgrove 41 (47); Jake Haberfield 3/30 (10 ov)

South Australia by 8 wickets
Hands Memorial Oval, Bunbury, Western Australia
Umpires: Ian Lock & Mick Martell
Player of the match: Aaron Heal (WA)

11 February 2009
(scorecard)

Queensland; 230/9 (50.0 overs)	v	Victoria (H); 95/10 (36.3 overs)
Andrew Symonds 39 (40); Chris Simpson 39 (39); Nathan Rimmington 3/15 (8 ov); Ben Laughlin 3/14 (7 ov)		Brad Hodge 25 (42); Clint McKay 3/22 (10 ov); Shane Harwood 3/58 (10 ov)

Queensland by 135 runs
Melbourne Cricket Ground, Melbourne
Umpires: Bruce Oxenford & Tony Ward
Player of the match: Ben Laughlin (QLD)

13 February 2009
(scorecard)

New South Wales; 245/7 (50.0 overs)	v	Victoria (H); 246/6 (49.3 overs)
Phillip Hughes 48 (84); David Warner 47 (45); Nathan Hauritz 2/35 (10 ov); Moises Henriques 2/35 (10 ov)		Chris Rogers 74 (109); Bryce McGain 2/33 (10 ov); Shane Harwood 2/57 (10 ov)

Victoria by 4 wickets
Melbourne Cricket Ground, Melbourne
Umpires: Geoff Joshua & John Ward
Player of the match: Chris Rogers (VIC)

14 February 2009
(scorecard)

(H) Tasmania; 254/8 (50.0 overs)	v	Western Australia; 255/7 (49.5 overs)
Luke Butterworth 114 (103); Xavier Doherty 3/30 (10 ov)		Marcus North 104 (101); Brad Knowles 5/62 (10 ov)

Western Australia by 3 wickets
Bellerive Oval, Hobart
Umpires: Ian Lock & Mick Martell
Player of the match: Marcus North (WA)

18 February 2009
(scorecard)

(H) South Australia; 258/7 (50.0 overs)	v	Queensland; 210/10 (47.5 overs)
Michael Klinger 70 (110); Mark Cosgrove 64 (57); Daniel Christian 3/50 (9.5 ov)		James Hopes 57 (78); Ryan Broad 48 (75); Nathan Rimmington 2/43 (8 ov); Ben Laughlin 2/67 (10 ov)

South Australia by 48 runs
Adelaide Oval, Adelaide
Umpires: Jeff Brookes & Andrew Craig
Player of the match: Mark Cosgrove (SA)

== Final ==
22 February 2009
14:15 (UTC+11) (D/N)
scorecard

Queensland; 187/8 (50 overs)	v	Victoria (H); 175/10 (48 overs)
Glen Batticciotto 40 (73); Chris Hartley 49 (102)*; Nathan Rimmington 4/40 (10 ov)		Rob Quiney 52 (58); Shane Harwood 2/23 (8.4 ov); Damien Wright 2/31 (10 ov)

Queensland won by 12 runs
Melbourne Cricket Ground, Melbourne
Umpires: Ian Lock & Paul Reiffel
Player of the match: Nathan Rimmington (Qld)

== Statistics ==
=== Most Runs ===
Player	Team	Matches	Innings	Runs	Balls	Strike rate	Average	HS	100s	50s
(Australia) Lee Carseldine	Queensland	11	11	477	599	79.62	43.36	126	2	2
(Australia) Michael Klinger	South Australia	10	10	469	669	70.10	52.11	133*	1	4
(Australia) Chris Rogers	Victoria	10	10	448	590	75.93	44.80	75	0	5
(Australia) Rob Quiney	Victoria	11	11	428	452	94.69	38.90	92	0	4
(Australia) Callum Ferguson	South Australia	9	9	406	424	95.75	45.11	101	1	3
As 22 February 2009

=== Most Wickets ===
Player	Team	Matches	Overs	Wickets	Economy rate	Average	Strike rate	BBI	5W
(Australia) Shane Harwood	Victoria	10	91.1	24	4.27	16.25	22.7	5/41	1
(Australia) Ben Laughlin	Queensland	11	76.0	23	4.50	14.86	19.8	6/23	1
(Australia) Aaron Bird	New South Wales	9	84.0	21	5.54	22.19	24.0	5/26	1
(Australia) Brett Geeves	Tasmania	8	67.5	14	5.17	25.07	29.0	3/25	0
(Australia) Chris Swan	Queensland	9	73.0	13	3.76	21.15	33.6	3/17	0
As 22 February 2009
