= List of 2013 Indian Premier League personnel changes =

This is a list of all personnel changes for the 2013 Indian Premier League (IPL).

== Retirement ==
Date	Name	Team(s) played (years)	Age	Notes	Ref.
18 August 2012	V. V. S. Laxman	Deccan Chargers (2008–2010); Kochi Tuskers Kerala (2011)	37	Went unsold at the 2012 auction. Retired from international cricket on 18 August 2012. Became the mentor-ambassador for the Sunrisers Hyderabad.	
29 October 2012	Sourav Ganguly	Kolkata Knight Riders (2008–2010); Pune Warriors India (2011–2012)	40	Retired from all forms of cricket on 28 October 2012.	
31 October 2012	Paul Collingwood	Delhi Daredevils (2009–2010); Rajasthan Royals (2011–2012)	36	Did not return after being released from his contract.	

== Trades ==
The trading window opened on 19 November 2012.

Date	Trade		Ref
12 February 2013	To Delhi Daredevils: Ashish Nehra	To Pune Warriors India: Ross Taylor	

== Signings ==
Player	Team	Ref.
CM Gautam	Delhi Daredevils	
Ishwar Pandey	Pune Warriors India	
Parvez Rasool	Pune Warriors India	
Tirumalasetti Suman	Pune Warriors India	
Sandeep Warrier	Royal Challengers Bangalore	
Sheldon Jackson	Royal Challengers Bangalore	
Abhinav Mukund	Royal Challengers Bangalore	
Sunny Sohal	Royal Challengers Bangalore	
Lokesh Rahul	Royal Challengers Bangalore	
Harmeet Singh	Rajasthan Royals	
Sachin Baby	Rajasthan Royals	
Sanju Samson	Rajasthan Royals	
Jalaj Saxena	Mumbai Indians	
Rishi Dhawan	Mumbai Indians	
Baba Aparajith	Chennai Super Kings	
Vijay Shankar	Chennai Super Kings	
Mohit Sharma	Chennai Super Kings	
Ankit Rajpoot	Chennai Super Kings	
Imtiyaz Ahmed	Chennai Super Kings	
Ronit More	Chennai Super Kings	
Karthikeyan R	Chennai Super Kings	
Steve Smith	Pune Warriors India	
Tamim Iqbal	Pune Warriors India	
Hanuma Vihari	Sunrisers Hyderabad	
Sachin Rana	Sunrisers Hyderabad	
Karn Sharma	Sunrisers Hyderabad	

Retained players

== Released players ==
In October 2012, the IPL franchise teams were offered the option of releasing any number of their players from their contracts ahead of the trading window and auction. This allowed teams to reduce player costs. The following players were released from their contracts.

Player	Team	Contract	Signed
Darren Bravo	Deccan Chargers	$100,000	2012
Daniel Christian	Deccan Chargers	$900,000	2011
Manpreet Gony	Deccan Chargers	$290,000	2011
Daniel Harris	Deccan Chargers	$70,000	2012
George Bailey	Chennai Super Kings	$50,000	2011
Doug Bollinger	Chennai Super Kings	$700,000	2011
Joginder Sharma	Chennai Super Kings	$150,000	2011
Suraj Randiv	Chennai Super Kings	$80,000	2011
Scott Styris	Chennai Super Kings	$200,000	2011
Gulam Bodi	Delhi Daredevils	†	2012
Doug Bracewell	Delhi Daredevils	$50,000	2012
Aaron Finch	Delhi Daredevils	$300,000	2011
Glenn Maxwell	Delhi Daredevils	†	2012
Venugopal Rao	Delhi Daredevils	$700,000	2011
Kyle Abbott	Kings XI Punjab	†	2012
Ben Cutting	Kings XI Punjab	†	2012
James Faulkner	Kings XI Punjab	$190,000	2012
Ramesh Powar	Kings XI Punjab	$160,000	2012
Nathan Rimmington	Kings XI Punjab	$20,000	2011
Stuart Broad	Kings XI Punjab	$400,000	2011
Richard Levi	Mumbai Indians	†	2012
Davy Jacobs	Mumbai Indians	$190,000	2011
Clint McKay	Mumbai Indians	$110,000	2011
Thisara Perera	Mumbai Indians	$650,000	2012
Michael Clarke	Pune Warriors India	†	2012
Sourav Ganguly	Pune Warriors India	†	2011
Callum Ferguson	Pune Warriors India	$300,000	2011
Nathan McCullum	Pune Warriors India	$100,000	2011
Jesse Ryder	Pune Warriors India	$150,000	2011
Graeme Smith	Pune Warriors India	$500,000	2011
James Hopes	Pune Warriors India	$350,000	2011
Johan Botha	Rajasthan Royals	$950,000	2011
Dinesh Chandimal	Rajasthan Royals	$50,000	2012
Paul Collingwood	Rajasthan Royals	$250,000	2011
Owais Shah	Rajasthan Royals	†	2012
Mohammad Kaif	Royal Challengers Bangalore	$130,000	2011
Charl Langeveldt	Royal Challengers Bangalore	$140,000	2011
Dirk Nannes	Royal Challengers Bangalore	$650,000	2011
Luke Pomersbach	Royal Challengers Bangalore	$50,000	2011
Rilee Rossouw	Royal Challengers Bangalore	$20,000	2011

†Signed as a replacement player for an undisclosed sum

== Withdrawn players ==
The following players withdrew from the tournament.

Player	Team	Reason	Ref
JP Duminy	Sunrisers Hyderabad	Injury	
Varun Aaron	Delhi Daredevils	Injury	
Michael Clarke	Pune Warriors India	Back and hamstring problems	
Sreenath Aravind	Royal Challengers Bangalore	Injury	
Kevin Pietersen	Delhi Daredevils	Knee injury	

== Auction ==
The players' auction for the 2013 season was held on 3 February in Chennai. Nottinghamshire County Cricket Club prevented their players (Michael Lumb, Alex Hales and Samit Patel in particular) from participating in the IPL and the auction to avoid losing them for the County Championship.

=== Sold players ===
All player contracts are for this season only.

Player	Team	Base price	Winning bid
Christopher Barnwell	Royal Challengers Bangalore	$50,000	$50,000
Johan Botha	Delhi Daredevils	$300,000	$450,000
Daniel Christian	Royal Challengers Bangalore	$100,000	$100,000
Michael Clarke	Pune Warriors India	$400,000	$400,000
Nathan Coulter-Nile	Mumbai Indians	$100,000	$450,000
Akila Dananjaya	Chennai Super Kings	$20,000	$20,000
Quinton de Kock	Sunrisers Hyderabad	$20,000	$20,000
Fidel Edwards	Rajasthan Royals	$100,000	$210,000
James Faulkner	Rajasthan Royals	$100,000	$400,000
Manpreet Gony	Kings XI Punjab	$200,000	$500,000
Moisés Henriques	Royal Challengers Bangalore	$100,000	$300,000
Jason Holder	Chennai Super Kings	$20,000	$20,000
Phillip Hughes	Mumbai Indians	$100,000	$100,000
Ben Laughlin	Chennai Super Kings	$20,000	$20,000
Glenn Maxwell	Mumbai Indians	$200,000	$1,000,000
Nathan McCullum	Sunrisers Hyderabad	$100,000	$100,000
Clint McKay	Sunrisers Hyderabad	$100,000	$100,000
Ryan McLaren	Kolkata Knight Riders	$50,000	$50,000
Ajantha Mendis	Pune Warriors India	$50,000	$725,000
Jeevan Mendis	Delhi Daredevils	$50,000	$50,000
Chris Morris	Chennai Super Kings	$20,000	$625,000
Dirk Nannes	Chennai Super Kings	$200,000	$600,000
Abhishek Nayar	Pune Warriors India	$100,000	$675,000
Jacob Oram	Mumbai Indians	$50,000	$50,000
Kusal Perera	Rajasthan Royals	$20,000	$20,000
Thisara Perera	Sunrisers Hyderabad	$50,000	$675,000
Luke Pomersbach	Kings XI Punjab	$50,000	$300,000
Ricky Ponting	Mumbai Indians	$400,000	$400,000
Ravi Rampaul	Royal Challengers Bangalore	$50,000	$290,000
Kane Richardson	Pune Warriors India	$100,000	$700,000
Jesse Ryder	Delhi Daredevils	$100,000	$260,000
Darren Sammy	Sunrisers Hyderabad	$100,000	$425,000
Sachithra Senanayake	Kolkata Knight Riders	$50,000	$625,000
Pankaj Singh	Royal Challengers Bangalore	$50,000	$150,000
R. P. Singh	Royal Challengers Bangalore	$100,000	$400,000
Sudeep Tyagi	Sunrisers Hyderabad	$100,000	$100,000
Jaydev Unadkat	Royal Challengers Bangalore	$100,000	$525,000
