= Kane Richardson =

Australian cricketer (born 1991)

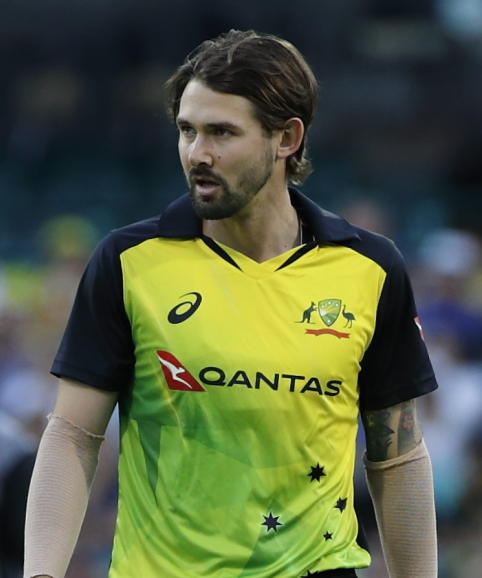
- Richardson in 2018

Personal information
- Full name: Kane William Richardson
- Born: 12 February 1991 (age 35); Eudunda, South Australia
- Height: 1.90 m (6 ft 3 in)
- Batting: Right-handed
- Bowling: Right-arm fast-medium
- Role: Bowler

International information
- National side: Australia (2013–2023)
- ODI debut (cap 201): 13 January 2013 v Sri Lanka
- Last ODI: 7 March 2020 v South Africa
- ODI shirt no.: 55
- T20I debut (cap 71): 5 October 2014 v Pakistan
- Last T20I: 28 November 2023 v India
- T20I shirt no.: 55

Domestic team information
- Years: Team
- 2008/09–2021/22: South Australia
- 2011/12–2016/17: Adelaide Strikers
- 2013: Pune Warriors India
- 2014: Rajasthan Royals
- 2016; 2021: Royal Challengers Bangalore
- 2017/18–2024/25: Melbourne Renegades
- 2022–2023: Birmingham Phoenix
- 2022/23–2025/26: Queensland
- 2023: Kent
- 2025/26: Sydney Sixers

Career statistics
Competition	ODI	T20I	FC	LA
Matches	25	36	34	98
Runs scored	75	17	664	506
Batting average	15.00	4.25	13.83	13.67
100s/50s	0/0	0/0	0/0	0/0
Top score	24*	9	49	36*
Balls bowled	1,312	756	7,045	5,176
Wickets	39	45	102	153
Bowling average	31.79	23.53	34.36	29.79
5 wickets in innings	1	0	1	6
10 wickets in match	0	0	0	0
Best bowling	5/68	4/30	5/69	6/48
Catches/stumpings	7/–	14/–	10/–	23/–
- Source: CricInfo, 5 April 2024

Kane William Richardson (born 12 February 1991) is a former Australian international cricketer who played domestic cricket for South Australia and Queensland and played in the Big Bash League for the Adelaide Strikers, Melbourne Renegades, and Sydney Sixers.

From 2013 to 2023, Richardson played international cricket for Australia in both One Day Internationals and Twenty20 Internationals, and as a teenager, he played for Australia's Under-19 team, winning the 2010 Under-19 Cricket World Cup with them. Richardson was also a member of the Australian team that won the 2021 T20 World Cup. He announced his retirement from all forms of cricket in January 2026.

== Career ==
Richardson was born at Eudunda in South Australia, but spent much of his childhood in Darwin in the Northern Territory. While in Darwin, Richardson played for Waratah and PINT Cricket Clubs, and represented the Northern Territory at junior levels. He moved back to South Australia to play for the State cricket team, making his Twenty20 debut in the 2008–09 Big Bash and his List A debut in the 2008–09 Ford Ranger Cup.

In 2009, Richardson was named in Australia's under-19 squad for their tour of India ahead of the 2010 Under-19 Cricket World Cup. While on tour in India, he managed a five-wicket haul in a youth test against India. After the tour, he went with the team to Kenya to play in the World Cup. He played three matches in the tournament and impressed with both bat and ball. His first standout performance came against Ireland, when he scored 23 runs from 14 balls and took three wickets with the new ball to help Australia to a crushing 209-run victory. He was brought into the team for the final of the World Cup against Pakistan, top-scoring with 44 runs to help Australia to their third Under-19 World Cup title. During his youth career, Richardson played in two youth Test matches and ten youth One Day Internationals (ODI).

Richardson was a crucial part of Such Australia's win in the 2010–11 Big Bash, taking three key wickets against New South Wales in the final of the tournament. His form carried over into the other forms of the game in this season as well, with a man-of-the-match bowling performance against Queensland in the Ryobi Cup being followed up with his first-class debut for South Australia in the next Sheffield Shield game. He was impressive on debut, taking a wicket in each of his first three overs of first-class cricket. At the end of the season, he was upgraded from a rookie contract with South Australia to a full contract for the first time, and when the Big Bash was replaced with the Big Bash League he stayed in Adelaide, playing for the new Adelaide Strikers.

Richardson had a breakout season in 2012–13, particularly in the Ryobi Cup where he took 21 wickets in just five matches with a very good average of 13.8, including a six-wicket haul against Queensland. On the back of his strong performances for South Australia and the Adelaide Strikers, Richardson replaced the injured Mitchell Starc in the 2nd One Day international against Sri Lanka on 13 January 2013, making his international debut. In his first One Day International, he got a first ball duck lbw to Lasith Malinga and the fine figures of 6 overs, 3 maidens and no wickets for 15 runs when he was removed by umpire Marais Erasmus for repeatedly running on the pitch in his follow through. He was forced to remodel his follow through during the rest of the season, but he continued to impress in domestic cricket with a five wicket haul against Victoria and six wickets against New South Wales.

Richardson made international headlines when he was bought by Pune Warriors in the 2013 IPL player's auction for $700,000, the third-highest price of any player that season despite the fact he had only played six first-class matches to that point. He went on to play just three matches in the 2013 season and before the following season was bought by Rajasthan Royals, playing seven matches and taking 11 wickets. This ended up being his only season with the team as, though he was then retained by the Royals for the 2015 season, he withdrew from the tournament for personal reasons.

During 2014 Richardson played for Australia A in a series of matches in Darwin. He had very good form, taking 13 wickets at an average of 11.30 and earning a return to Australia's ODI team for the 2014 Zimbabwe Tri-Series. He impressed Australian selectors enough to be included in both the ODI and T20I squad for Australia's matches against Pakistan in the United Arab Emirates. He made his Twenty20 International debut for Australia against Pakistan in the United Arab Emirates in October 2014. Despite his successes in 2014, Richardson was unable to secure his spot in the national team and wasn't included in the Australia A squad in 2015.

Richardson made another comeback in the 2015–16 Australian summer when he was again very successful in one-day matches, being named South Australia's player of the tournament for the Matador Cup. He made his way back into the national team in January 2016, joining the ODI squad against India. His breakthrough performance came in this series, when in a match at Manuka Oval, he took five wickets, causing the Indian batting order to collapse and taking Australia from a losing position to a dramatic win. After this series, Richardson went with the Australian team to New Zealand, but he was withdrawn from the series due to a back injury. Later scans ruled him out of the rest of the season, meaning he missed the final four rounds of the 2015–16 Sheffield Shield season.

Richardson returned from his back injury to first-class cricket for Australia A in northern Queensland in the 2016 winter, but injuries again affected him in the 2016–17 season. A hamstring injury interrupted Richardson's Matador Cup campaign and another back injury caused him to miss most of BBL|06. Despite these injuries, he had the most consistent Sheffield Shield season of his career, playing in eight matches for the Redbacks.

Although Richardson started to find consistent form and recover from his injury problems, he was unable to gain a permanent place in Australia's national team as Australia already had four world-class fast bowlers in Mitchell Starc, Josh Hazlewood, Pat Cummins and James Pattinson. This limited Richardson's opportunities at the international level to occasions when one or more of the other fast bowlers was injured. As a result, Richardson was again included in the Australia A squad in 2017 for the 2017 South Africa A Team Tri-Series, though Australia had to pull out of the series due to a pay dispute. Despite the cancellation of the series, Richardson was selected for Australia's ODI and T20I series in India when Hazlewood, Cummins and Pattinson were all simultaneously injured. In three ODIs in India, he took seven wickets.

After spending the first six seasons of the Big Bash League with the Adelaide Strikers, being the club's all-time leading wicket-taker taking 42 wickets in 40 Twenty20 matches for the Strikers and South Australia combined, Richardson decided he wanted a fresh start and signed a new five-year contract with the Melbourne Renegades ahead of BBL|07.

In April 2018, Richardson was awarded a national contract by Cricket Australia for the 2018–19 season. In May 2019, he was added to Australia's squad for the 2019 Cricket World Cup, replacing Jhye Richardson, who was ruled out of the tournament with a dislocated shoulder.

In February 2020, Richardson was named in Australia's ODI squad for their series against New Zealand. He missed the first match as he reported symptoms of COVID-19, though he tested negative and re-joined the squad. In April 2020, Cricket Australia awarded Richardson with a central contract ahead of the 2020–21 season. On 16 July 2020, Richardson was named in a 26-man preliminary squad of players to begin training ahead of a possible tour to England following the COVID-19 pandemic. On 14 August 2020, Cricket Australia confirmed that the fixtures would be taking place, with Richardson included in the touring party.

In August 2021, Richardson was named in Australia's squad for the 2021 ICC Men's T20 World Cup.

Richardson played Queensland Grade Cricket for the Gold Coast Mens 1st team, and Victorian Premier Cricket for the Geelong Cricket Club’s 1st XI He announced his retirement from all forms of professional cricket in January 2026.

== Playing style ==
Richardson is a right-arm fast-medium bowler. He is known for his fast pace and aggression and is skilled at bowling well-directed yorker. Richardson's bowling action resembles Australian Test bowler Paul Reiffel. In addition to bowling, Richardson is a capable batsman and an athletic fielder. He able to take impressive catches in the field. Richardson has done a two-kilometre time trial in 6:39, placing him among the fittest Australian cricketers.

Richardson has had far more success in limited overs cricket, playing for Australia in both One Day Internationals and Twenty20 Internationals, than in first-class cricket, as he is yet to play a Test match for Australia. This has led to him being referred to as a white ball specialist. Part of the reason for his success in shorter forms of the game is his ability to both open and close the bowling well.

== Veganism ==
Richardson is a vegan, not eating animal products. Cricket balls are made with leather, an animal product, and Richardson has said that he would prefer if they were not made with leather.
