= Ryan Duffield =

Australian cricketer

Personal information
- Full name: Ryan Matthew Duffield
- Born: 20 June 1988 (age 38); Narrogin, Western Australia
- Batting: Left-handed
- Bowling: Left-arm fast-medium
- Role: Bowler

Domestic team information
- Years: Team
- 2010/11–2016/17: Western Australia
- 2012/13: Perth Scorchers
- 2014/15: Brisbane Heat

Career statistics
Competition	FC	LA	T20
Matches	19	12	3
Runs scored	239	37	1
Batting average	10.39	18.50	1.00
100s/50s	0/0	0/0	0/0
Top score	36	18*	1
Balls bowled	3,270	589	66
Wickets	69	14	4
Bowling average	28.63	40.85	21.00
5 wickets in innings	1	0	0
10 wickets in match	0	0	0
Best bowling	6/77	4/58	3/28
Catches/stumpings	8/–	2/–	0/–
- Source: CricketArchive, 28 December 2014

Ryan Matthew Duffield (born 20 June 1988) is an Australian retired professional cricketer, formerly contracted to Western Australia, Brisbane Heat and Perth Scorchers.

Duffield was born in Narrogin, Western Australia. He played for Gosnells and Melville in the Western Australian Grade Cricket competition, and also played for Western Australia Under-23s in the 2009–10 Futures League. He took nine wickets in three Futures League matches, with a best of 4/50 against South Australia U23s, and scored a best of 28*, also against South Australia. In Futures League Twenty20s he took seven wickets in three games at an average of 9.29, a competition record, with a best of 3/22 against Australian Centre of Excellence. He did not bat. Duffield made his first-class debut for the Warriors in the Sheffield Shield against Victoria in October 2010, taking 3/92 and 0/15 on debut, and making 31 runs in the second innings of the match. He made his debut in the Ryobi One-Day Cup a week later against New South Wales, taking 1/57. Against New South Wales in the Shield game from 28 November to 1 December, Duffield took 3/64 in the first innings and 6/77 in the second innings to record his best innings and match figures.

Duffield played a single match for the Perth Scorchers during the 2012 Champions League Twenty20. He signed to the Brisbane Heat for the 2014–15 Big Bash League season, and made his debut against the Sydney Thunder in December 2014. In his second match, he took 3/28 against the Melbourne Stars, and was named man of the match.

== Personal life ==
Duffield's sister, Paris Duffield, is a basketball player who has played in the NBL1 West. His cousin, Paul Duffield, played in the AFL for the Fremantle Dockers.
