= Adam Maher (cricketer) =

Australian cricketer (born 1981)

Personal information
- Born: 14 November 1981 (age 44); Newcastle, New South Wales, Australia
- Bowling: Right-arm medium-fast
- Role: Bowler

Domestic team information
- Years: Team
- 2009-2013: Tasmania
- Source: Cricinfo, 20 March 2016

Adam Maher (born 14 November 1981) is an Australian cricketer. He played 21 first-class matches for Tasmania between 2009 and 2013.

== See also ==
- List of Tasmanian representative cricketers
