= Nathan Coulter-Nile =

Australian cricketer

Personal information
- Full name: Nathan Mitchell Coulter-Nile
- Born: 11 October 1987 (age 39); Perth, Western Australia
- Nickname: River
- Height: 191 cm (6 ft 3 in)
- Batting: Right-handed
- Bowling: Right-arm fast
- Role: Bowling all-rounder

International information
- National side: Australia (2013–2019)
- ODI debut (cap 204): 14 September 2013 v England
- Last ODI: 20 June 2019 v Bangladesh
- T20I debut (cap 61): 13 February 2013 v West Indies
- Last T20I: 27 February 2019 v India

Domestic team information
- Years: Team
- 2009/10–present: Western Australia
- 2011/12–2018/19: Perth Scorchers
- 2013: Mumbai Indians
- 2014–2016: Delhi Daredevils
- 2017: Kolkata Knight Riders
- 2019/20–2023/24: Melbourne Stars
- 2020–2021: Mumbai Indians
- 2022: Rajasthan Royals

Career statistics
Competition	ODI	T20I	FC	LA
Matches	32	28	37	80
Runs scored	252	150	994	703
Batting average	16.80	13.63	18.75	17.57
100s/50s	0/1	0/0	0/3	0/3
Top score	92	34	64	92
Balls bowled	1,678	582	6,861	4,310
Wickets	52	34	124	146
Bowling average	29.90	23.58	28.68	24.97
5 wickets in innings	0	0	2	2
10 wickets in match	0	0	0	0
Best bowling	4/48	4/31	6/84	5/26
Catches/stumpings	7/–	13/–	24/–	28/–
- Source: ESPNcricinfo, 26 November 2019

Nathan Mitchell Coulter-Nile (born 11 October 1987) is an Australian cricketer who has played at One Day International (ODI) and Twenty20 International level for the Australian national team. Domestically, he is contracted to Western Australia and the Melbourne Stars. From Perth, Western Australia, Coulter-Nile attended Aquinas College, and represented the state under-17 and under-19 teams, later going on to play three youth ODI matches for the Australian national under-19 team. Having held a rookie contract from the Western Australian Cricket Association (WACA) for several seasons, he made his debut at state level during the 2009–10 season, and has since become a regular selection in Western Australia and the Perth Scorchers' fast bowling attacks. Coulter-Nile made his Twenty20 International debut for the Australian national cricket team in February 2013, and his ODI debut in September 2013.

== Early career ==
Coulter-Nile was born in Perth, Western Australia, on 11 October 1987. He is the eldest of three children, and has two younger sisters. He was educated at Aquinas College. He played in state representative teams from an early age, representing Western Australia at both under-17 and under-19 level. At the 2003–04 National Under-17 Championships, Coulter-Nile took four wickets from five matches, although he scored only 19 runs from his five innings during the tournament. Two seasons later, at the 2005–06 National Under-19 Championships (held in Perth), he took eight wickets at an average of 24.50 from his six matches. In grade cricket, Coulter-Nile made his third-grade debut for the Fremantle District Cricket Club during the 2003–04 season, aged 16. He made his first-grade debut the following season, and took 18 wickets at an average of 25.72 from his ten first-grade matches. This included figures of 5/56 against Joondalup, his first five-wicket haul in the competition. A member of the Dennis Lillee Fast Bowling Academy, Coulter-Nile was selected to appear for the Australian national under-19 team in three under-19 One Day International (ODI) matches against the Pakistan under-19s in April 2007, at the end of the 2006–07 season. This followed on from a season for Fremantle in which he took 30 wickets, as well as appearing in a single Cricket Australia Cup match for the state second XI team.

== Domestic career ==
=== Western Australia ===
At the end of the 2012–13 season, Coulter-Nile was awarded the Laurie Sawle Medal as Western Australia's player of the season.

=== Perth Scorchers ===
Coulter-Nile was a member of the Perth Scorchers' 15-man squad for the inaugural 2011–12 season of the franchise-based Big Bash League, which replaced the state-based KFC Twenty20 Big Bash as the Australian domestic Twenty20 competition. The squad was very similar to that of Western Australia, with other fast bowlers including Ryan Duffield, Ben Edmondson, Joe Mennie, and Nathan Rimmington, as well as all-rounders Paul Collingwood and Mitchell Marsh. Having missed the team's first two matches due to concerns over an injured shoulder, Coulter-Nile debuted for Perth in the Scorchers' third match, replacing Shaun Marsh for the game against the Brisbane Heat at the WACA Ground in late December 2011. He went on to play in each of the team's six remaining matches, including in both the semi-final against the Melbourne Stars and the final against the Sydney Sixers. Coulter-Nile finished the season with 10 wickets at an average of 17.40, third in Perth's wicket-taking behind Ben Edmondson (14 wickets) and Brad Hogg (13 wickets). His best bowling figures, 3/9 from three overs, came against the Sydney Thunder in mid-January 2012, at ANZ Stadium Having also affected two run outs during the Thunder's total of 99 all out, he was awarded man of the match.

In July 2012, Coulter-Nile re-signed with the Perth Scorchers for the 2012–13 Big Bash League season. During the Big Bash League offseason, he also played in the team's three matches in the 2012 Champions League Twenty20. The team's squad for the 2012–13 season differed slightly from the previous season, with Tim Armstrong, Jason Behrendorff, Hilton Cartwright, and Alfonso Thomas replacing Duffield (not contracted), Marsh (injured), and Rimmington (Melbourne Renegades) as members of Perth's bowling attack. With Justin Langer having replaced Lachlan Stevens as coach prior to the start of the season, Coulter-Nile began to be used in a different role. Usually bowling three or four overs, often first change behind Thomas and spinner Michael Beer, he took ten wickets at an average of 27.60 from his ten matches, but also usually played as a top-order batsman. This was not entirely a success, given that he scored only 61 runs from his eight innings. However, in a match against Brisbane at the Gabba in mid-December 2012, Coulter-Nile scored 23 not out from just six balls, including 20 runs from four balls in Dan Christian's final over. With rain necessitating the use of the Duckworth–Lewis method, Perth had been set 51 runs from five overs. Coulter-Nile was named man of the match for his performance, despite having conceded 39 runs from his three overs in Brisbane's innings.

=== Indian Premier League ===
At the player auction prior to the 2013 season of the Indian Premier League, Coulter-Nile was sold to the Mumbai Indians for US$450,000. Although his reserve price had been $100,000, Mumbai and the Rajasthan Royals (owned by Nita Ambani and Shilpa Shetty, respectively) engaged in a bidding war which eventually raised his price to its final figure. Coulter-Nile played his only match for team in May 2013, against Kings XI Punjab at the HPCA Stadium in Dharamshala. On debut, he took 1/29 from four overs bowling, and scored nine runs from six balls while batting, with the Indians losing by 50 runs. At the 2014 IPL auction, he was bought by Delhi Daredevils for Rs. 4.25 crores (approximately A$750,000). In February 2017, he was bought by the Kolkata Knight Riders team for the 2017 Indian Premier League for 3.5 crores. He was named in the IPL XI of the tournament in 2017 by Cricbuzz. In January 2018, he was bought by Royal Challengers Bangalore for Rs. 2.2 crores. He was released by the Royal Challengers Bangalore ahead of the 2020 IPL auction.

In the 2020 IPL auction, he was bought by the Mumbai Indians ahead of the 2020 Indian Premier League. In February 2022, he was bought by the Rajasthan Royals for his base price ₹2 Cr in the Mega auction for the 2022 Indian Premier League tournament.

=== Cowaramup Bulls ===
He currently plays in the Busselton-Margaret River Cricket Association for the Cowaramup Bulls.

== International career ==
Following on from his form for Western Australia during the 2011–12 season, Coulter-Nile played two first-class matches for Australia A during the team's 2012 tour of England. Despite being called up for the tour after James Pattinson withdrew due to an abdominal strain, he played in another match for Australia A in November 2012, against the touring South Africans. After good form in all three formats of the game during the 2012–13 season, Coulter-Nile began to be seriously considered to play for Australia. Following on from his nine-wicket Sheffield Shield performance against Queensland in February 2013, two former international players—Mike Hussey and Shane Warne—both nominated him as a potential debutant during the ODI and T20I series held towards the end of that season. Coulter-Nile was selected to make his international debut in a T20I against the West Indies later that month. On debut, he took 1/36 from four overs while bowling, and scored 16 not out from 11 balls while batting, including two sixes.

In May 2013, Coulter-Nile was named in Australia's 15-man squad for the 2013 ICC Champions Trophy, to be held in England and Wales in June 2013. He played no matches during the tournament, but was selected to tour both India and South Africa with Australia A in the middle of the year. This included a one-day tri-series involving Australia A, India A, and South Africa A, in which Coulter-Nile scored 104 runs and took two three-wicket hauls in four matches. In one match against South Africa A, he scored 62 runs, which included a partnership of 133 runs for the seventh wicket with Shaun Marsh (136*), and helped Australia A win the match by three wickets. Based on this form, Coulter-Nile was selected in Australia's 18-man senior squad for the ODI and Twenty20 International portions of Australia's 2013 tour of England. In late August, he played his second T20I match. With Australia losing by 27 runs, he failed to take a wicket, conceding 47 runs from four overs, but scored 13 runs from six balls while batting, including two sixes.

In April 2019, he was named in Australia's squad for the 2019 Cricket World Cup. In the Cricket World cup, he scored his maiden ODI half-century and made the highest score by a number 8 batsman in the World Cup in the group stage match against the West Indies. In the match against Pakistan, Coulter-Nile took his 50th wicket in ODIs.

Nathan almost made his debut for the baggy greens when he was called up as replacement for Mitchell Starc in the Australia vs West Indies Test series 2015–16. However, an injury and Australia's strong fast bowling depth prevented him from earning the coveted Test Cap. Finally, a back injury in 2017 made him restricted to limited overs formats.
