= Luke Butterworth =

Australian cricketer (born 1983)

Personal information
- Full name: Luke Rex Butterworth
- Born: 28 October 1983 (age 43); Hobart, Tasmania, Australia
- Nickname: Buttsy
- Height: 1.90 m (6 ft 3 in)
- Batting: Left-handed
- Bowling: Right-arm medium
- Role: All-rounder

Domestic team information
- Years: Team
- 2003/04–2014/15: Tasmania
- 2011/12: Sydney Thunder

Career statistics
Competition	FC	List A	T20
Matches	70	63	9
Runs scored	2,762	887	66
Batting average	27.89	22.74	11.00
100s/50s	3/11	1/1	0/0
Top score	116	114*	36
Balls bowled	12,087	2,572	130
Wickets	223	61	5
Bowling average	24.68	37.22	38.80
5 wickets in innings	8	0	0
10 wickets in match	1	0	0
Best bowling	6/49	3/32	2/27
Catches/stumpings	50/–	22/–	2/–
- Source: Cricinfo, 18 July 2020

Luke Rex Butterworth (born 28 October 1983) is a former Australian cricket player, who played interstate cricket for Tasmania and club cricket for Glenorchy.

Butterworth became a regular in Tasmania's one-day side, but had to wait until 2006/07 to make his first-class debut. Although he was not a regular in the side during Tasmania's first Pura Cup winning season in 2006/07, he did play an outstanding role in the final, scoring 66 and 106, his maiden first class century. He also took 4/33 in the first innings, and his combined efforts earned him the distinction of being man of the match in Tasmania's first ever Pura Cup winning final. He was called up to the Australian A team that toured Pakistan in 2007.

In the 2010–11 Sheffield Shield season, Butterworth was the leading wicker-taker, taking 43 wickets at an average of 15.04. He helped Tasmania win another Shield title in 2012–13.
