= Chris Duval =

Australian cricketer (born 1983)

Personal information
- Full name: Chris John Duval
- Born: 3 August 1983 (age 43); Elizabeth, South Australia
- Nickname: Bear
- Height: 1.93 m (6 ft 4 in)
- Batting: Right-handed
- Bowling: Right-arm fast-medium

Domestic team information
- Years: Team
- 2004/05–2005/06: South Australia
- 2006/07–2008/09: Tasmania
- 2009/10–2010/11: South Australia
- FC debut: 12 October 2007 Tasmania v Queensland
- Last FC: 29 October 2010 South Australia v Western Australia
- LA debut: 7 November 2004 South Australia v Tasmania
- Last LA: 4 December 2010 South Australia v Victoria

Career statistics
Competition	FC	LA	T20
Matches	12	14	2
Runs scored	360	131	2
Batting average	30.00	26.20	1.00
100s/50s	0/3	0/0	0/0
Top score	87	32	2
Balls bowled	2,159	632	36
Wickets	18	14	3
Bowling average	58.61	44.07	14.66
5 wickets in innings	0	0	0
10 wickets in match	0	0	0
Best bowling	4/29	3/33	2/27
Catches/stumpings	8/–	2/–	0/–
- Source: CricketArchive, 2 January 2011

Chris Duval (born 3 August 1983) is a former Australian cricketer, who played for South Australia and Tasmania. He was a fast bowler who generated enough pace to have interested scouts from American baseball outfit Los Angeles Dodgers. Duval transferred to Tasmania from South Australia in 2006 in an effort to boost the fast-bowling attack following a series of injuries. He later transferred back to South Australia where he became a regular player until he was dropped after the 2010–11 season.
