= Brendan Drew =

Australian cricketer

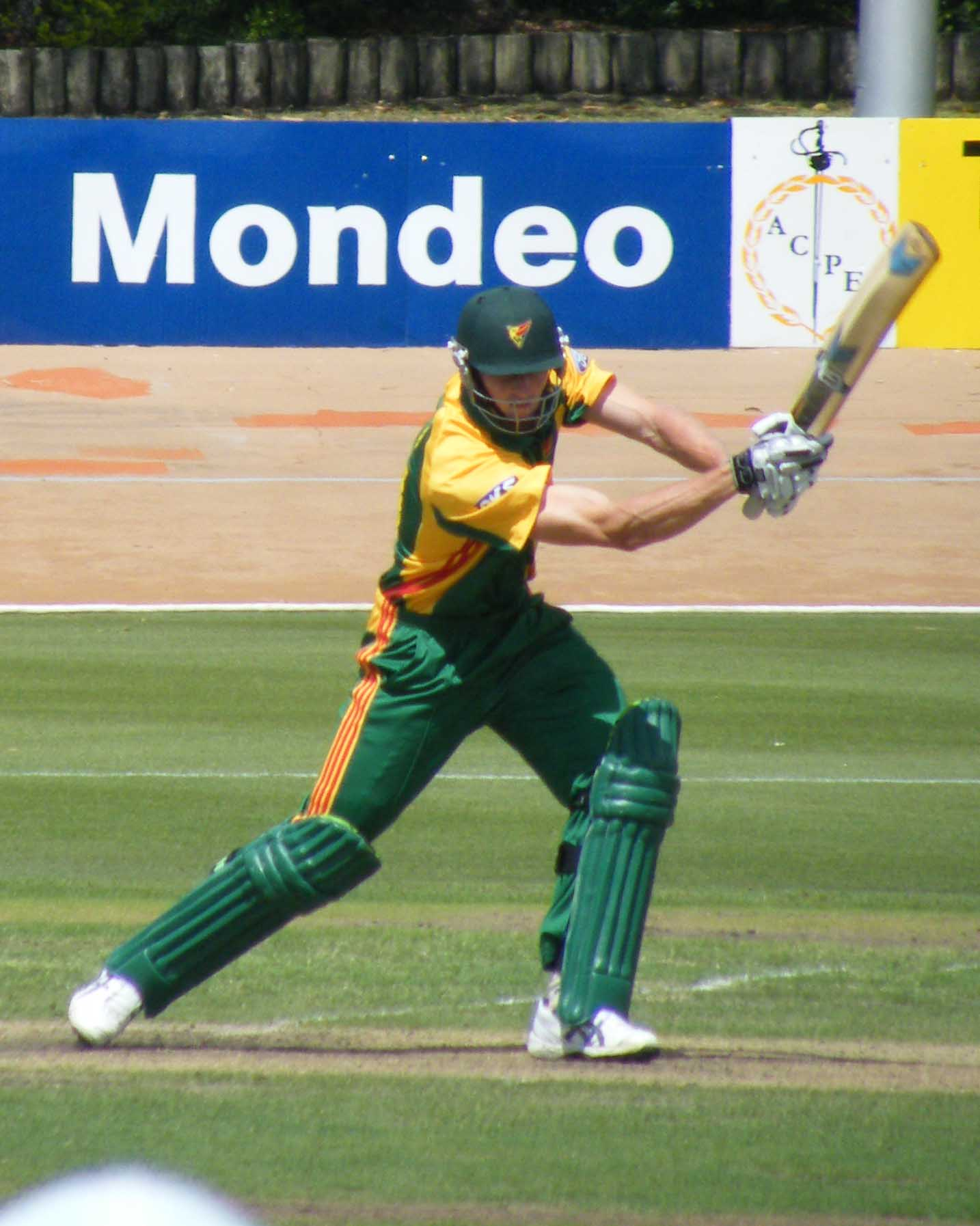

Personal information
- Full name: Brendan Gerard Drew
- Born: 16 December 1983 (age 42); Lismore, New South Wales, Australia
- Height: 1.93 m (6 ft 4 in)
- Batting: Right-handed
- Bowling: Right-arm fast-medium
- Role: Bowler

Domestic team information
- Years: Team
- 2005/06–2011/12: Tasmania
- 2008: Gloucestershire
- 2011/12: Adelaide Strikers

Career statistics
Competition	FC	LA	T20
Matches	34	51	19
Runs scored	523	328	109
Batting average	14.94	15.61	13.62
100s/50s	0/0	0/0	0/0
Top score	44*	33*	25
Balls bowled	5,460	2,391	384
Wickets	83	78	22
Bowling average	41.75	28.55	24.59
5 wickets in innings	2	1	0
10 wickets in match	0	0	0
Best bowling	6/94	5/36	3/24
Catches/stumpings	17/–	16/–	13/–
- Source: CricketArchive, 18 July 2020

Brendan Gerard Drew (born 16 December 1983) is an Australian cricketer, who played domestic cricket for the Tasmanian Tigers. When not on Tasmanian duty, Drew played Tasmanian club cricket for the Lindisfarne Cricket Club. A tall bowler who generates a lot of pace and bounce, Drew arrived in Tasmania mid-season in 2005 to fill in for a bowling attack struck by injury. He had a solid 2006 season, taking 20 Pura Cup wickets at 31.60 in six matches, and was 12th man in the Tasmania's historic first ever Pura Cup win in 2006–07. Drew later moved to Victoria and played premier cricket for Camberwell, and won the Jack Ryder Medal as Premier Cricket's best player in 2016–17.
