= Scott Coyte =

Australian cricketer (born 1985)

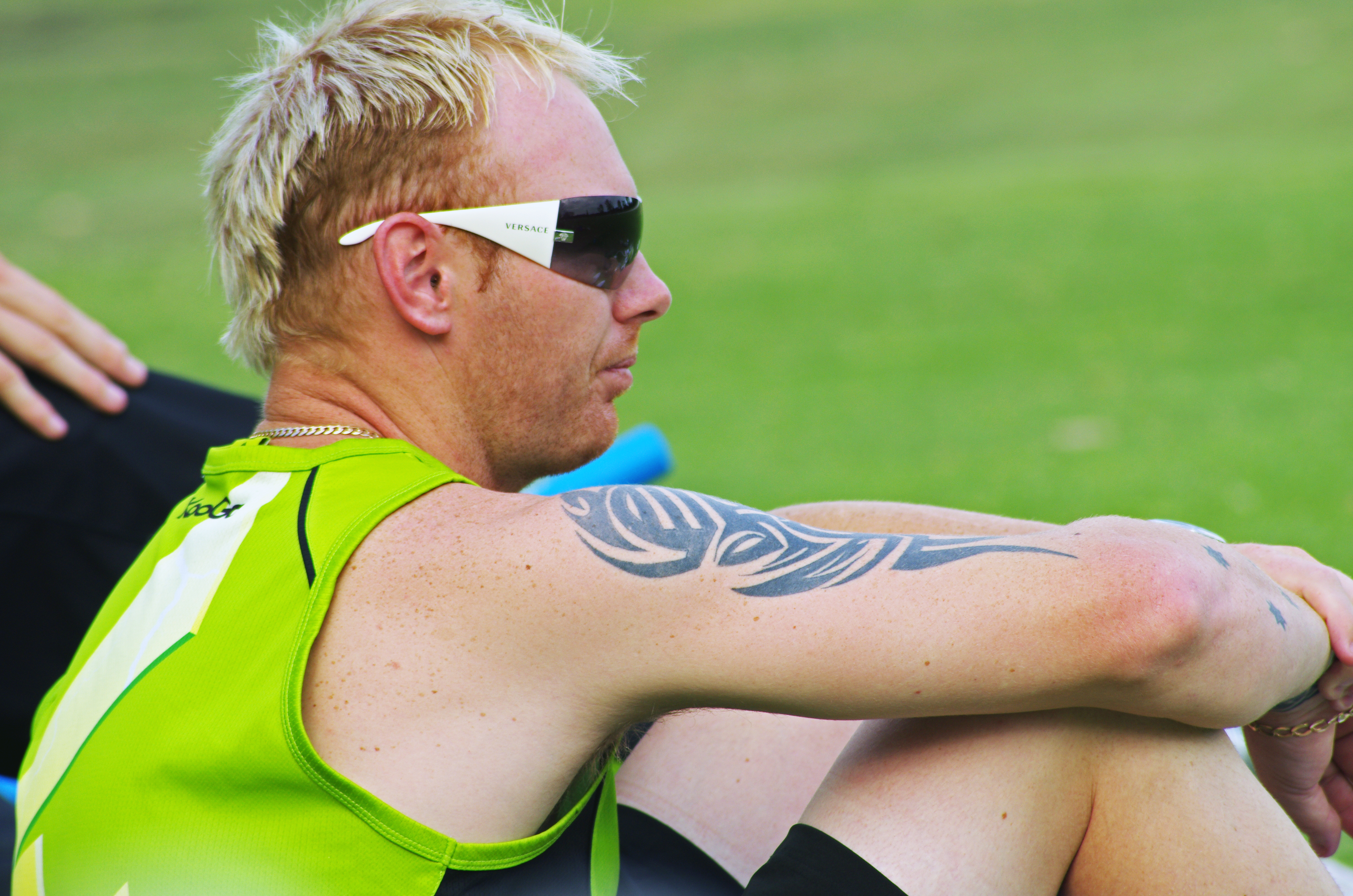
- Scott Coyte (2014)

Personal information
- Born: 7 March 1985 (age 41); Liverpool, Sydney, Australia
- Height: 1.75 m (5 ft 9 in)
- Batting: Left-handed
- Bowling: Right-arm fast-medium
- Role: Bowler
- Relatives: Sarah Coyte (sister)
- Source: ESPNcricinfo, 11 October 2020

Scott James Coyte (born 7 March 1985, in Liverpool, Sydney, Australia) is an Australian cricketer. He plays first-class cricket for New South Wales and has represented the Australian Under-19 team. He is a right-arm fast-medium bowler and a left-hand bat.

His sister, Sarah Coyte, has played for the Australian women's cricket team.
