= Luke Pomersbach =

Australian cricketer

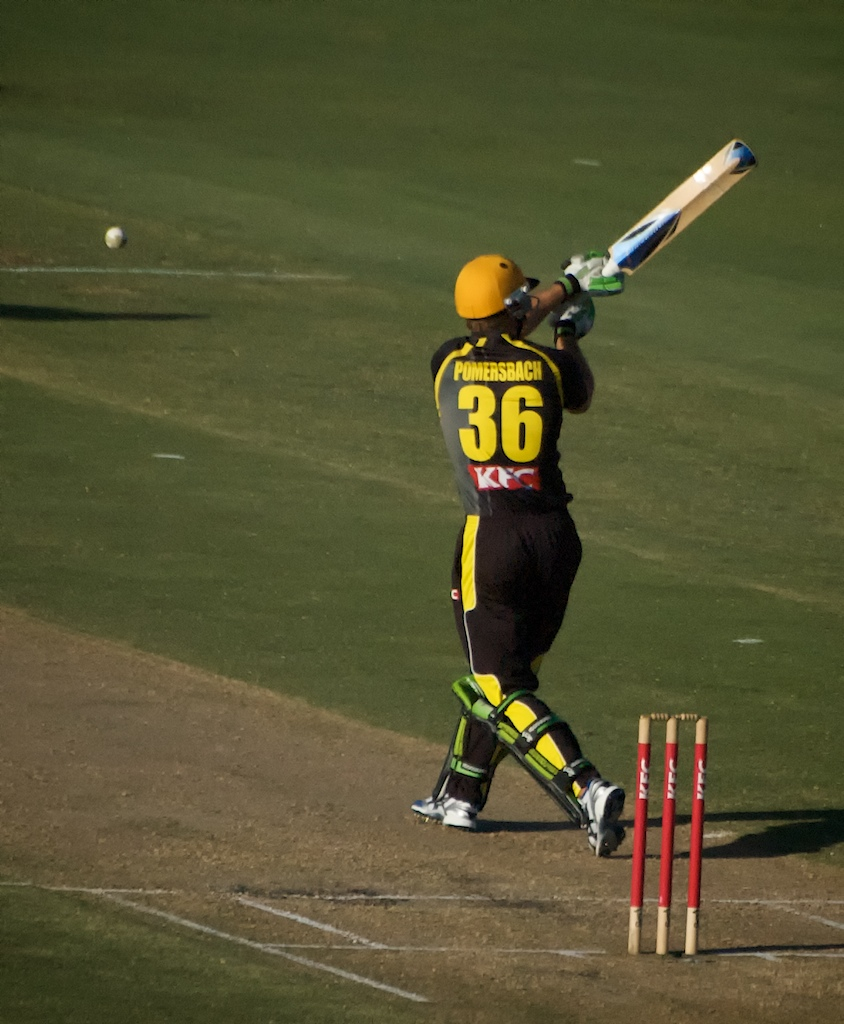

Personal information
- Full name: Luke Anthony Pomersbach
- Born: 28 September 1984 (age 42); Bentley, Western Australia
- Nickname: Pomers
- Height: 1.78 m (5 ft 10 in)
- Batting: Left-handed
- Bowling: Right-arm off-break
- Role: Batsman

International information
- National side: Australia
- Only T20I (cap 26): 11 December 2007 v New Zealand

Domestic team information
- Years: Team
- 2006/07–2010/11: Western Australia
- 2008–2009: Kings XI Punjab
- 2011–2012: Royal Challengers Bangalore
- 2012/13–2013/14: Brisbane Heat
- 2012/13–2013/14: Queensland
- 2013: Kings XI Punjab

Career statistics
Competition	T20I	FC	LA	T20
Matches	1	39	37	56
Runs scored	15	2,785	666	1,228
Batting average	15.00	39.78	20.81	26.12
100s/50s	0/0	5/20	1/2	1/5
Top score	15	176	104*	112*
Balls bowled	–	273	18	–
Wickets	–	5	0	–
Bowling average	–	30.80	–	–
5 wickets in innings	–	0	–	–
10 wickets in match	–	0	–	–
Best bowling	–	1/4	–	–
Catches/stumpings	0/–	51/–	20/–	21/–
- Source: ESPNcricinfo, 6 June 2014

Luke Anthony Pomersbach (born 28 September 1984) is a former Australian cricketer. He played mainly for Western Australia and Royal Challengers Bangalore. Citing mental health issues, he retired from the game in June 2014.

== Career ==
Pomersbach made his Ford Ranger Cup debut for Western Australia in their match against New South Wales in November 2006, scoring 33 runs from 47 balls. In December 2006 in a two-day tour match at the WACA against a touring England XI, he showed his potential, scoring 101 not out.

Shortly after, he made his first-class cricket debut against Tasmania in a Pura Cup match at Bellerive Oval in Hobart. He performed well, scoring 74 in the first innings, partnering Chris Rogers in a 106 run fifth-wicket partnership. He continued his form in the second innings, coming to the wicket with WA in trouble at 4/36 and scoring 63 runs.

Despite a suspension from the state side for drinking alcohol following a game against Queensland, Pomersbach was named in the Cricket Australia Chairman's XI to play in the annual Lilac Hill game in December 2007. He starred against the New Zealanders, scoring 88 runs from 65 balls. Pomersbach then made a most unusual debut for the Australian cricket team in a Twenty20 International against New Zealand in Perth on 11 December 2007. Having not been selected in the original squad for the match, Pomersbach was at the ground as a spectator, when a back injury to Brad Hodge during the warm-up forced the Australian team to call on him as an emergency replacement. He scored 15 runs from seven balls, including a 6 off the third ball he faced. Pomersbach also won the 2008 Bradman Young Player of the Year.

Pomersbach signed with Perth Scorchers in the 2011/12 Big Bash League, but in October stood down from Western Australia and the Scorchers to deal with depression.

He played for Kings XI Punjab in the 2008 and 2009 Indian Premier League seasons before switching to Royal Challengers Bangalore for the 2011 season. In 2012 Pomersbach returned to play for Bangalore in the 2012 Indian Premier League. In January 2013 he was the second leading run scorer in the 2012–13 Big Bash League season. Playing for the Brisbane Heat, he scored 112 runs from 70 deliveries in the semi-final and was a member of the team which won the final. He was again bought by Kings XI Punjab for the 2013 Indian Premier League.

== Personal life and controversy ==
Pomersbach attended Yale Primary School and Kent Street Senior High School in Perth.

In November 2007, Pomersbach and fellow Western Warrior Shaun Marsh were suspended from the state side for drinking alcohol following a game against Queensland.

On 9 August 2009, after two hit-and-run incidents, Pomersbach was arrested and charged by police with failing to stop, failing to accompany police, driving with a blood alcohol level in excess of .08, assaulting a public officer, obstructing police and escaping legal custody. He pleaded guilty and was fined and had his driver's licence cancelled. The WACA responded by suspending him indefinitely. On 6 October 2009, Pomersbach was awarded an extraordinary driver's licence due to hardship using public transport. He returned from his ban for Western Australia in January 2010.

Pomersbach first stood down from playing for Western Australia and the Perth Scorchers towards the end of 2011 to focus on his struggle with depression. He cited mental health issues as the reason for his retirement from cricket in 2014.

In May 2012, he was arrested and charged with molesting a woman and assaulting her fiancé after an incident at a hotel in India. He was released on bail but had to surrender his passport. The case was later settled out of court and the charges were dropped.

He received press coverage in 2021 as a result of charges relating to stealing, aggravated burglary, and involvement with drugs.
