= Ben Edmondson =

Australian cricketer (born 1978)

Personal information
- Full name: Ben Matthew Edmondson
- Born: 28 September 1978 (age 48); Southport, Queensland, Australia
- Nickname: Edo
- Height: 1.85 m (6 ft 1 in)
- Batting: Left-handed
- Bowling: Right-arm fast-medium
- Role: Bowler

Domestic team information
- Years: Team
- 2003: Denmark
- 2003/04–2009/10: Western Australia
- 2007: Gloucestershire
- 2010/11: South Australia
- 2011/12: Perth Scorchers
- FC debut: 7 December 2003 Western Australia v Tasmania
- Last FC: 3 March 2011 South Australia v Victoria
- LA debut: 28 August 2003 Denmark v Wales Minor Counties
- Last LA: 19 February 2011 South Australia v Queensland

Career statistics
Competition	FC	LA	T20
Matches	58	40	23
Runs scored	169	41	9
Batting average	4.12	5.85	4.50
100s/50s	0/0	0/0	0/0
Top score	18	16*	2*
Balls bowled	9,865	2,079	487
Wickets	194	64	30
Bowling average	33.61	27.71	20.30
5 wickets in innings	4	1	0
10 wickets in match	1	0	0
Best bowling	7/95	5/39	4/14
Catches/stumpings	19/–	6/–	4/–
- Source: CricketArchive, 2 November 2011

Ben Matthew Edmondson (born 28 September 1978) is an Australian cricketer who has played for the Western Warriors, Southern Redbacks and Gloucestershire. He is a right-arm fast-medium bowler born at Southport, Queensland.

After struggling to get a game for Queensland due to the long fast-bowling queue, Edmondson was invited to Western Australia. He made his Pura Cup debut for the Warriors after just five days from his arrival. He finished the season with 28 wickets at an average of 31.61. He was one of the heroes against his former state in a thrilling ING Cup final victory.

The next summer he was the state's leading wicket taker with 29 victims in seven games. He was rewarded with selection in the Prime Minister's XI. In 2005–06 he demonstrated great consistency by again topping 20 wickets with 24 at 33.79. Edmondson has career best figures of 6/28.

In 2003 he represented Denmark in a one-day game against Wales.

He moved to the Southern Redbacks for the 2010–11 season, and represented Glenelg in the local competition in Adelaide. Edmondson's season at the Redbacks was a success, taking the most wickets in the domestic one-day competition, and he retired in March 2011.

In July 2011 he was signed by the new Perth Scorchers team for the 2011–12 Big Bash Twenty20 league.
