= Xavier Doherty =

Australian cricketer

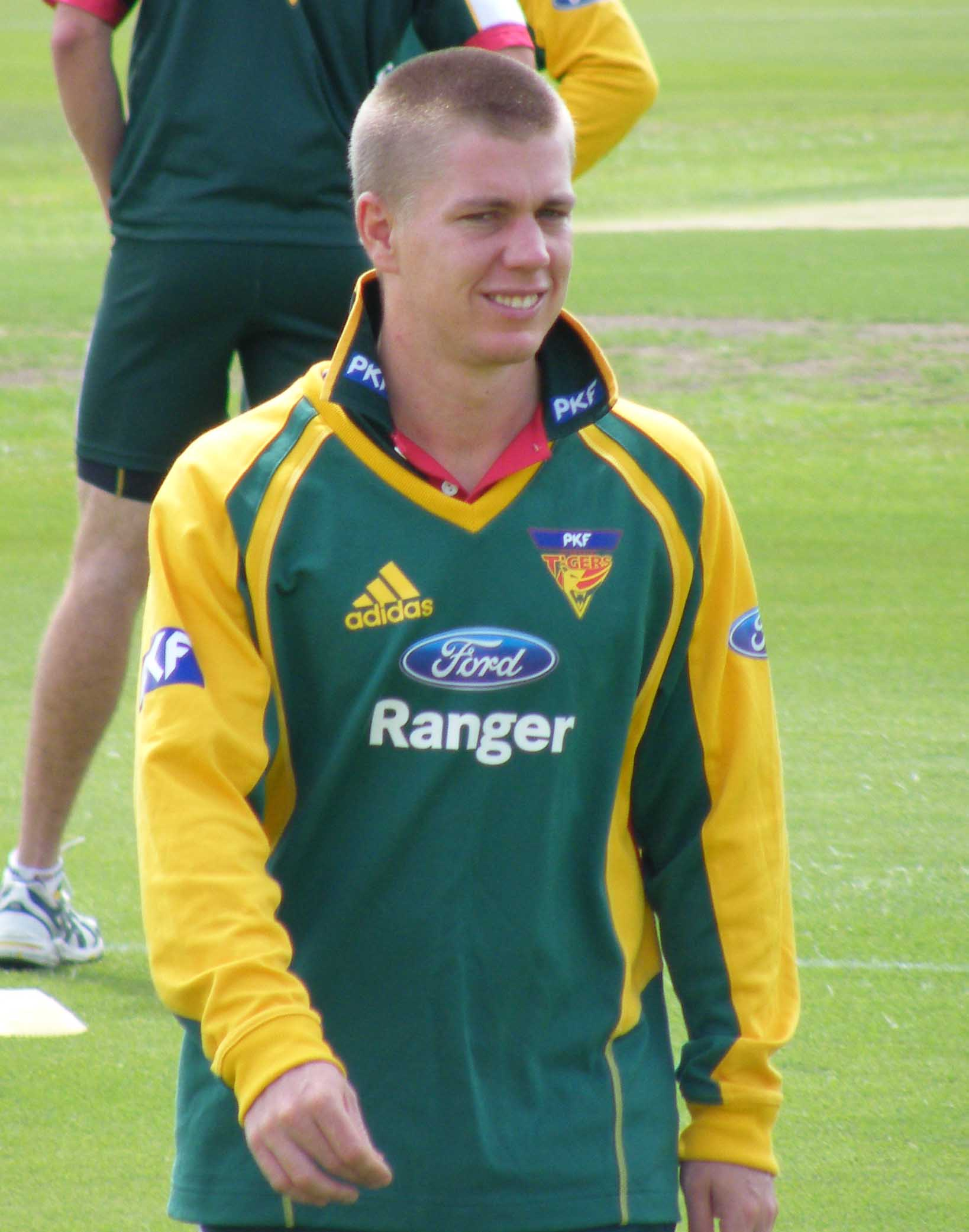
- Doherty in 2008

Personal information
- Full name: Xavier John Doherty
- Born: 22 November 1982 (age 43); Scottsdale, Tasmania, Australia
- Height: 178 cm (5 ft 10 in)
- Batting: Left-handed
- Bowling: Slow left-arm orthodox
- Role: Bowler

International information
- National side: Australia (2010–2015)
- Test debut (cap 417): 25 November 2010 v England
- Last Test: 14 March 2013 v India
- ODI debut (cap 184): 3 November 2010 v Sri Lanka
- Last ODI: 8 March 2015 v Sri Lanka
- ODI shirt no.: 3
- T20I debut (cap 56): 1 February 2012 v India
- Last T20I: 10 October 2013 v India
- T20I shirt no.: 3

Domestic team information
- Years: Team
- 2001/02–2016/17: Tasmania (squad no. 24)
- 2011/12–2014/15: Hobart Hurricanes
- 2015/16–2016/17: Melbourne Renegades

Career statistics
Competition	Test	ODI	FC	LA
Matches	4	60	71	176
Runs scored	51	101	1,272	833
Batting average	12.75	14.42	14.13	17.72
100s/50s	0/0	0/0	0/2	0/1
Top score	18*	15*	53*	53
Balls bowled	918	2,792	13,178	8,313
Wickets	7	55	163	190
Bowling average	78.28	40.43	42.64	34.08
5 wickets in innings	0	0	4	0
10 wickets in match	0	0	0	0
Best bowling	3/131	4/28	6/149	4/18
Catches/stumpings	2/–	19/–	25/–	55/–
Medal record
Men's Cricket
Representing Australia
ICC Cricket World Cup
Winner	2015 Australia and New Zealand
- Source: ESPN Cricinfo, 18 July 2020

Xavier John Doherty (born 22 November 1982) is a former Australian international cricketer who played Australian domestic cricket with Tasmania and internationally for Australia.

He is a left-handed batsman and a slow left arm orthodox bowler. After continued one-day success for Tasmania, Doherty made his One Day International debut for Australia against Sri Lanka at the Melbourne Cricket Ground in November 2010. Later that month, he made his Test debut against England at the Gabba, when he replaced off spinner Nathan Hauritz in team. He was not selected in Australia's 2011 World Cup squad due to a back injury. Doherty was a member of the Australian team that won the 2015 Cricket World Cup.

In March 2017, he announced his retirement from domestic cricket, following the conclusion of the 2016–17 Sheffield Shield season. He is now working as a carpenter.

== Cricket career ==
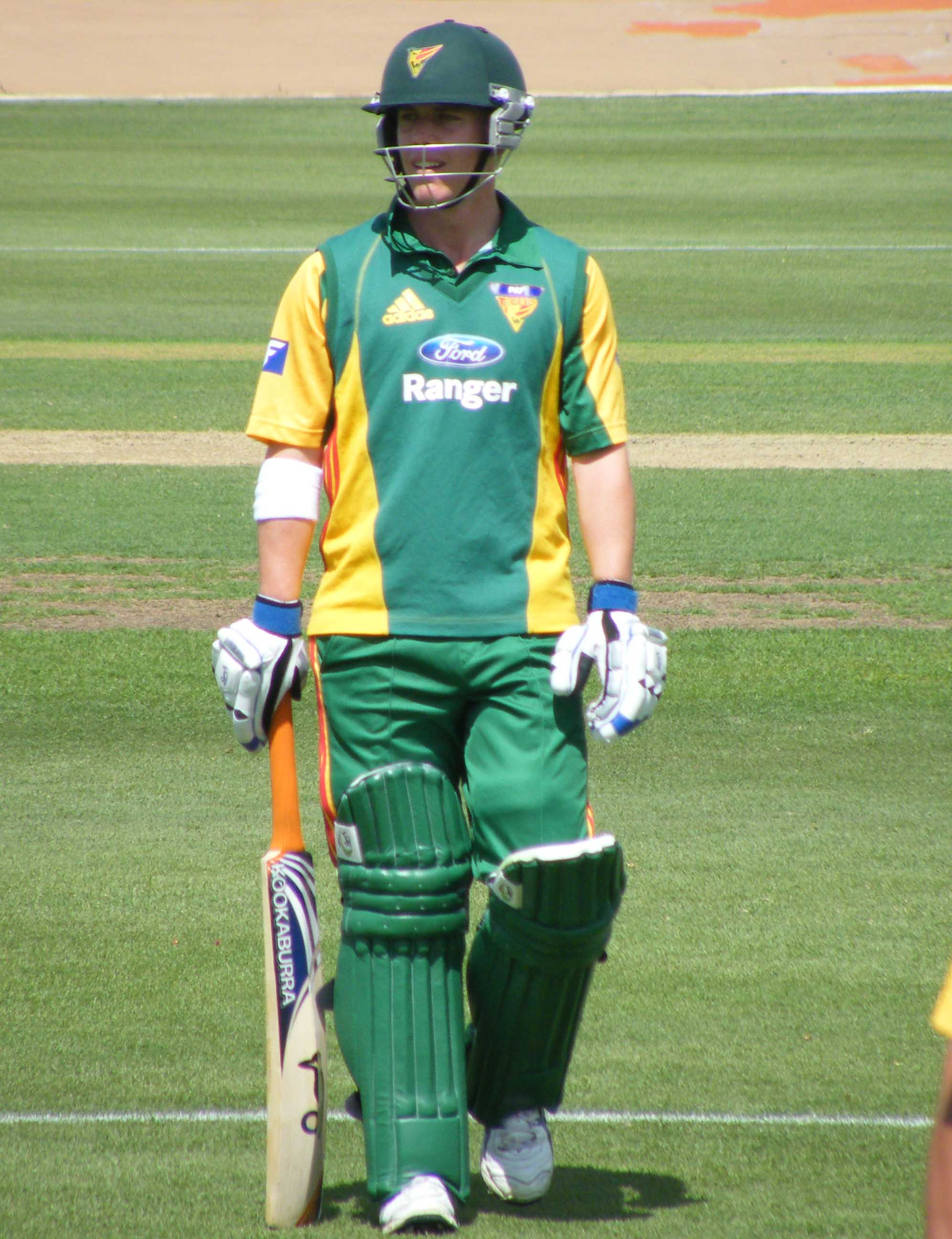
Doherty playing for Tasmania in 2008

He plays club cricket for South Hobart/Sandy Bay Cricket Club, and also played in the 2002 U-19 Cricket World Cup in New Zealand. He started playing cricket in his home town for the George Town Cricket Club where he debut in the NTCA 1st grade at the age of 12. Doherty then moved to the Launceston Cricket Club.

Doherty took an impressive 4/46 from 10 overs with the ball in a losing effort against the Sri Lankans on his One Day International debut.

He made his Test debut not long after against England in the First Test of the 2010–11 Ashes series, ahead of then-incumbent Test spinner, Nathan Hauritz. Australian Chairman of Selectors, Andrew Hilditch, stated before the team for the match was announced: "If we play a specialist spinner, which I am pretty sure we will be, it will be Xavier", which showed the likelihood that Doherty would make his Test and Ashes debuts simultaneously. He took his first Test wicket by dismissing Ian Bell in Brisbane. Doherty was recalled for the 2013 Test series against India. He played in the 2nd and 3rd Tests of the Series. In the 2 Tests, his figures were 4/242.
