= Chris Swan =

Australian cricketer

Personal information
- Full name: Christopher Andrew Swan
- Born: 10 August 1978 (age 48); Southport, Queensland, Australia
- Batting: Right-handed
- Bowling: Right-arm fast medium

Domestic team information
- Years: Team
- 2006/07–2011/12: Queensland
- 2011/12: Brisbane Heat

Career statistics
Competition	FC	LA	T20
Matches	31	23	1
Runs scored	804	100	–
Batting average	21.15	8.33	–
100s/50s	0/3	0/0	–
Top score	82	30*	–
Balls bowled	5,673	1,182	24
Wickets	101	31	1
Bowling average	25.92	27.38	16.00
5 wickets in innings	3	0	0
10 wickets in match	1	0	0
Best bowling	7/75	4/24	1/16
Catches/stumpings	11/–	4/–	0/–
- Source: ESPNcricinfo, 1 August 2022

Christopher Richard Swan (born 10 August 1978) is an Australian professional cricketer. He is a right-arm swing bowler who played for Queensland between 2006 and 2012.

Swan was born at Southport, Queensland in 1978. Before playing first-class cricket, Swan played for the Gold Coast Dolphins in Queensland's grade cricket premiership. He once took nine wickets in an innings for the Dolphins and became the club's captain and coach. He made his debut for Queensland at the age of 28 in a four-day match against New South Wales in October 2006. Despite taking five wickets in the match, it would be more than a year before he played for Queensland again. Upon his recall to the Queensland side, in a limited overs match, he took four wickets for 24 runs and was named the man of the match. He subsequently earned a full-time contract with Queensland. His best bowling figures for Queensland are 7–75, while he has scored three half-centuries as a batsman. The 7–75 performance came in a four-day match against South Australia in November 2010 in which he took 13 wickets—the third best bowling performance in the Bulls' history. The performance followed Swan being dropped from the Bulls' team—he only played in the match after other bowlers withdrew from the team with injuries. His average score with the bat in first class cricket is over 20, while his bowling average is less than 26 runs for every wicket.

As a youngster, Swan represented Queensland in junior Australian rules football squads.
