= Aaron O'Brien =

Australian cricketer

Personal information
- Full name: Aaron Warren O'Brien
- Born: 2 October 1981 (age 45); St Leonards, New South Wales, Australia
- Height: 1.82 m (6 ft 0 in)
- Batting: Left-handed
- Bowling: Slow left-arm orthodox
- Role: All-rounder

Domestic team information
- Years: Team
- 2001/02–2006/07: New South Wales
- 2008/09–2011/12: South Australia
- 2011/12: Adelaide Strikers
- 2012/13–2013/14: Melbourne Renegades
- FC debut: 14 December 2001 New South Wales v Western Australia
- LA debut: 6 January 2002 New South Wales v Victoria

Career statistics
Competition	FC	LA	T20
Matches	49	64	58
Runs scored	1,846	1,147	255
Batting average	26.75	31.00	15.93
100s/50s	1/8	0/6	0/0
Top score	147	62*	38
Balls bowled	5,619	2,395	1,161
Wickets	51	40	55
Bowling average	56.11	48.85	25.95
5 wickets in innings	0	0	0
10 wickets in match	0	0	0
Best bowling	4/74	4/41	3/15
Catches/stumpings	27/–	20/–	22/–
- Source: CricketArchive, 21 May 2023

Aaron Warren O'Brien (born 2 October 1981) is an Australian cricketer. He has played first class cricket for New South Wales. He was Middleton Cricket Club's professional deputising for the injured Brendon Reddy for the match against Crompton.

O'Brien signed with South Australia for the 2008–2009 domestic season, to get regular playing opportunities.
