= Simon Fry =

Australian cricket umpire (born 1966)

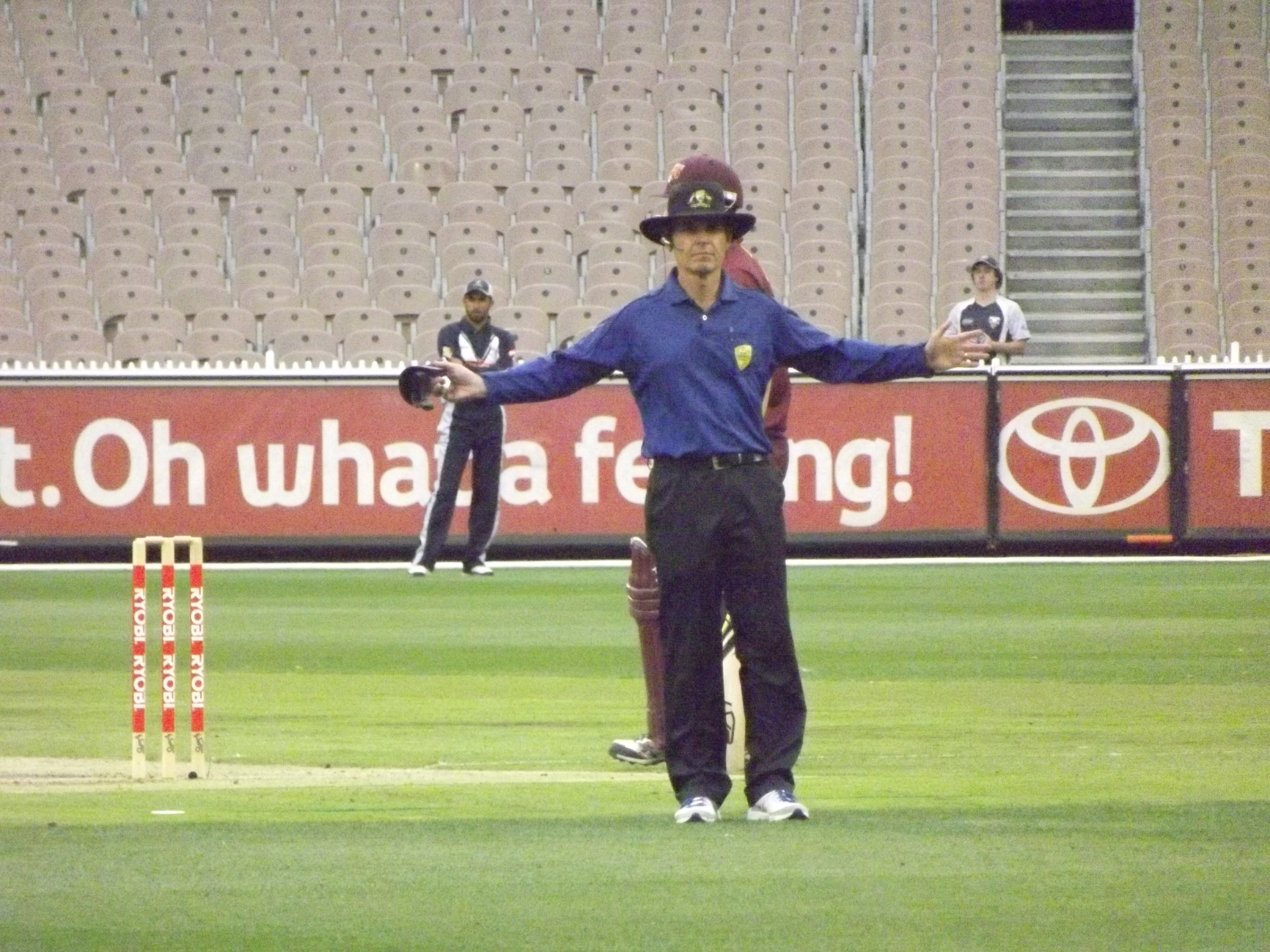
- Simon Fry umpiring at the MCG

Personal information
- Full name: Simon Douglas Fry
- Born: 29 July 1966 (age 60); Adelaide, South Australia
- Role: Umpire

Umpiring information
- Tests umpired: 7 (2015–2017)
- ODIs umpired: 49 (2011–2018)
- T20Is umpired: 19 (2011–2019)
- WODIs umpired: 4 (2006–2010)
- WT20Is umpired: 4 (2012–2016)
- Source: ESPN cricinfo, 17 April 2020

Simon Douglas Fry (born 29 July 1966) is an Australian former cricket umpire. In April 2020, Fry announced his retirement from elite umpiring.

== Umpiring career ==
Fry served as an international umpire in ODIs for the first time in a match between Australia and England at Adelaide on 26 January 2011. He stood in his first T20I when Australia and England played at Adelaide on 12 January 2011.

He was among the twenty umpires who stood in matches during the 2015 Cricket World Cup. On 22 October 2015 he made his debut as an umpire in a Test match, standing in the game between Sri Lanka and the West Indies at Colombo (PSS).

He stood in 100 First-class, 130 List A and 93 T20 matches.

== See also ==
- List of Test cricket umpires
- List of One Day International cricket umpires
- List of Twenty20 International cricket umpires
