= Nathan Hauritz =

Australian cricketer

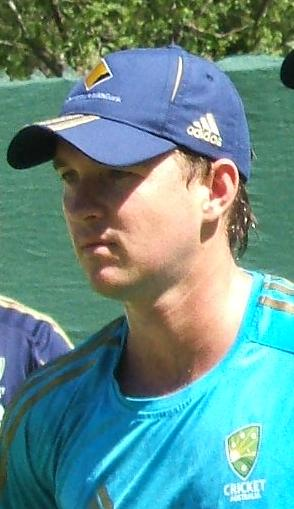

Personal information
- Full name: Nathan Michael Hauritz
- Born: 18 October 1981 (age 45); Wondai, Queensland, Australia
- Nickname: Ritz
- Height: 181 cm (5 ft 11 in)
- Batting: Right-handed
- Bowling: Right-arm offbreak
- Role: Bowler

International information
- National side: Australia (2002–2011)
- Test debut (cap 390): 3 November 2004 v India
- Last Test: 9 October 2010 v India
- ODI debut (cap 147): 22 March 2002 v South Africa
- Last ODI: 21 January 2011 v England
- ODI shirt no.: 43

Domestic team information
- Years: Team
- 2001/02–2005/06: Queensland
- 2006/07–2011/12: New South Wales
- 2011/12–2013/14: Brisbane Heat (squad no. 43)
- 2012/13–2013/14: Queensland
- 2014/15: Sydney Thunder
- 2015/16: Melbourne Renegades (squad no. 43)

Career statistics
Competition	Test	ODI	FC	LA
Matches	17	58	79	172
Runs scored	426	336	1,747	1,208
Batting average	25.05	22.40	21.04	19.17
100s/50s	0/2	0/1	2/4	0/2
Top score	75	53*	146	53*
Balls bowled	4,200	2,724	15,768	8,299
Wickets	63	63	187	196
Bowling average	34.98	34.15	43.02	32.87
5 wickets in innings	2	0	4	0
10 wickets in match	0	0	0	0
Best bowling	5/53	4/29	5/39	4/29
Catches/stumpings	3/–	24/–	45/–	60/–
Medal record
Men's Cricket
Representing Australia
ICC Cricket World Cup
Winner	2003 South Africa-Zimbabwe-Kenya
- Source: ESPNcricinfo, 19 January 2016

Nathan Michael Hauritz (/ˈhɔːrɪts/; born 18 October 1981) is a former Australian cricketer who has represented Australia in Tests, One-dayers and Twenty20 Internationals. He is mainly noted for his off spin bowling. He was a part of the Australian squad which won the 2003 Cricket World Cup and the 2009 ICC Champions Trophy.

After representing Australia at Under-19 level and making his ODI debut in 2002 at the age of 20, Hauritz made his Test debut in 2004 in India, where he turned out a credible performance. Upon his return to Australia, however, his form at first class level did not live up to expectations and as a result he found himself out of the Australian side and struggling to hold a place in the Queensland side. As a result, he switched to playing State cricket for New South Wales in the 2006–07 season. Nevertheless, even after the move Hauritz's opportunities to play regularly in senior cricket were limited.

On the eve of the 2nd Test against New Zealand at the Adelaide Oval in November 2008, Hauritz found himself unexpectedly called into the Australian side, four years after making his debut, as Australia searched for a spinner to replace Shane Warne. He went on to play three Tests during the 2008–09 Australian home season and was subsequently selected for Australia's tour to South Africa. Although he did not play in any of the Tests, he played in all of the One Day Internationals. Later during Australia's one-day series against Pakistan, Hauritz was Australia's leading wicket-taker. These performances were enough for the Australian selectors to include Hauritz in the squad for the 2009 Ashes series.

In January 2016, Hauritz announced his retirement from competitive cricket.

== Early life and career ==
Nathan Michael Hauritz was born in Wondai, Queensland on 18 October 1981. As a junior Hauritz played his cricket with the Hervey Bay Cricket Association, representing Wide Bay at the Under 12 to Under 15 levels before captaining the Under 14 Queensland Development side that toured New Zealand in 1996. Between the 1996–97 and 2000–01 seasons Hauritz represented Queensland at both Under 17 and Under 19 levels, as well as taking part in the Under 19 Australian side's tour to England in 1999 and the 1999–2000 Under 19 tour to Sri Lanka.

In 2000–01 Hauritz attended the Australian Institute of Sport in Adelaide during which time he played a number of matches against academy sides from New Zealand and Sri Lanka before captaining the Australian Under 19 side on its tour to Bangladesh.

In total Hauritz played six Youth Tests and 14 Youth One Day Internationals.

== Domestic career ==
On the back of his performances at Under 19s level for Queensland and Australia in 2001 Hauritz was selected to play for the Queensland one-day side to play against Victoria at the Gabba on 19 January 2001. In a day-night game that Victoria went on to win, Hauritz took 0/38 off his ten overs and scored a duck with the bat. Nevertheless, he was selected again for the next match and played out the rest of the Mercantile Mutual Cup season for the Bulls.

Later in the year, in Queensland's opening game of the 2001–02 Pura Cup, Hauritz made his first class debut playing against Victoria at the Punt Road Oval in Melbourne on 24 October 2001. In a rain shortened match, Hauritz scored 41 after coming in at number ten in Queensland's first innings, before taking 1/35 off 16 overs and 0/36 off 12 overs with the ball.

Following this Hauritz played first class and one-day domestic cricket for Queensland with regularity between 2001 and 2005, however, following his inclusion in squad for Australia's tour to India in 2004, where Hauritz made his Test debut, he found himself struggling for form in the first class game, and his opportunities to play regularly for Queensland became more infrequent. In the 2004–05 domestic season he played just six matches and the following season he played only one. In the 2005 off season, Hauritz undertook a stint in the Lancashire League in which he played 24 matches for the Nelson Cricket Club.

Following criticism about his ability to spin the ball, Hauritz made the decision to move to New South Wales to play for the Blues, where he felt that he might have more opportunities to showcase his talents as a spinner on the traditionally spin-friendly Sydney Cricket Ground wicket. Nevertheless, opportunities at first class level remained elusive for Hauritz and in the 2006–07 Pura Cup season he played only three first class games, including the final against Tasmania, in which he played alongside his main rival Stuart MacGill and took 0/22 and 1/56 in a match that Tasmania won by 426 runs.

He encountered more competition for selection when left arm unorthodox spinner Beau Casson moved from Western Australia to New South Wales.

The following season Hauritz found himself out of favour once more, playing only one first class game for New South Wales, although he played in eight one-day domestic games as part of the Ford Ranger Cup. The 2008–09 season began only a little better for Hauritz, playing the first couple of matches of the Sheffield Shield competition and a tour game against New Zealand, however, he found himself not selected for New South Wales' next Shield game and it seemed once again that he might spend the rest of the season on the sidelines. A surprise return to the Australian Test team for the 2nd Test against New Zealand, however, seemed to offer him a lifeline and after a creditable performance against New Zealand in the Test at Adelaide, Hauritz found himself back in the New South Wales side, playing two more Sheffield Shield games in which he took ten wickets—including a career best 4/86—before being called for international duty in South Africa.

== International career ==
Hauritz began his international cricket career when he made his One Day International debut against South Africa on 22 March 2002 at the Wanderers Stadium in Johannesburg. He subsequently went on to play seven more One Day Internationals between then and May 2003 before finding himself out of favour with the Australian selectors.

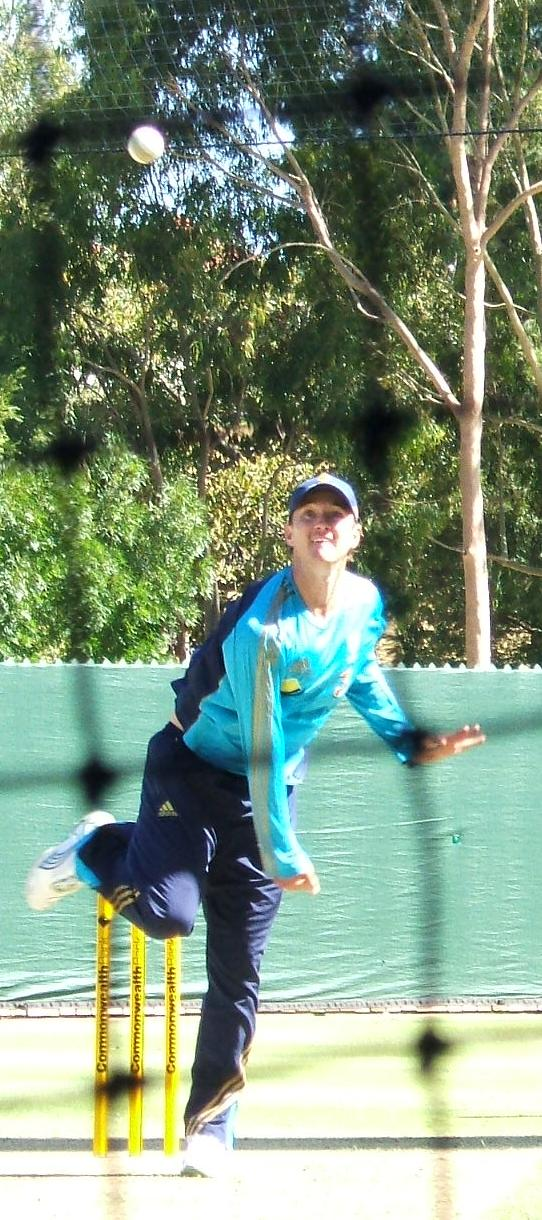
Hauritz bowling at the Adelaide Oval nets, January 2009

In November 2004, however, Hauritz and leg spinner Cameron White were surprise selections ahead of Stuart MacGill for Australia's tour of India. The reasoning given by the selectors was that as they intended to play only one spinner—Shane Warne—MacGill was unlikely to play so they would not lose anything by taking some young spinners instead, in order to gain experience.

However, Warne suffered an injury on the eve of the 4th Test at Mumbai, so Hauritz played, as it was too late to fly MacGill in. Hauritz took 3/16 in the first innings, including the wickets of Sachin Tendulkar and VVS Laxman, and match figures of 5/103. Nevertheless, upon his return to Australia afterwards he found himself struggling to maintain a place in both the Queensland and New South Wales state first class sides and was not selected to play another Test again until four years later, when in November 2008 he was recalled into the Australian squad for the 2nd Test against New Zealand at the Adelaide Oval to replace Jason Krejza who had suffered an ankle injury. Hauritz went on to take four wickets in the match, but was not selected for the next Test, against South Africa at Perth, as Krezja had recovered by then.

However, after Australia's loss to South Africa Krejza was dropped and Hauritz called into the side to play the remaining two Tests.

Since Warne's retirement at the start of 2007, Australia had used Brad Hogg, MacGill, Casson, Krejza and White in Tests with limited success, and none played more than four in that period.

He played his third Test, the Boxing Day Test at the Melbourne Cricket Ground and was found to be quite economical, bowling 43 overs in South Africa's 1st innings for only 3/98. In the 3rd Test at Sydney, Hauritz scored 41 with the bat and although he went wicketless in South Africa's first innings, in the second he took the important wicket of Hashim Amla as Australia went on to win the match by 103 runs.

Following his performances in the Tests against South Africa in Australia, Hauritz was selected for the reciprocal tour to South Africa, however, in the end he did not play in any of the Tests. Nevertheless, he played in all five of the One Day Internationals, taking a career best of 4/29 in the first ODI against South Africa on 3 April 2009. He also went on to play in all the one-day matches in Australia's ODI series against Pakistan in the United Arab Emirates where was Australia's highest wicket-taker, taking seven wickets in five matches. These performances led to his selection in squad for the 2009 Ashes series in England, where he took part in the first three of the five Tests that were played, taking match figures of 6/158 in the first Test and 3/106 in the second. It was in the second Test, on 16 July 2009 that Hauritz suffered a dislocation of his middle finger on his bowling hand from the ball catching the tip during a "caught-and-bowled" catch attempt and was unable to bowl at a crucial stage of the innings. Although Hauritz came back and took two quick wickets, England later went on to win the match by 115 runs. In the third Test he took 1 for 57 off 18 overs in his only innings. Australia played out a draw in the rain affected match. Hauritz was overlooked for the fourth Ashes Test with NSW fast bowler Stuart Clark preferred. Australia won the 4th Ashes Test, leveling the series and needed a win in the fifth and final Test of the 2009 Ashes. Hauritz again was overlooked on what appeared to be a "spinners paradise" and Graeme Swann claimed eight wickets as England won the match and regained the Ashes. Selectors later admitted to misreading the pitch and Hauritz should have been selected.

Hauritz was picked for the ODI series against England, where he performed well, playing all seven matches and taking nine wickets at an average of 28.77. He subsequently later took part in Australia's successful Champions Trophy campaign.

Hauritz remained a fixture in the Australian side during the 2009–10 season, fighting off injury concerns to play in Test series against West Indies and Pakistan. Most notably, he finished 2009 on a high with 5/101, his maiden five-wicket haul, against Pakistan at the MCG, and then replicated the effort in the next Test at the SCG against the same opponents, taking 5/53 in the second innings as Australia sealed a remarkable comeback victory.

Hauritz picked up his 50th Test Wicket in Hobart 2010.

Following the test series against Pakistan, the One Day Series against Pakistan and West Indies begun and Hauritz played every match, including 3/28 against the West Indies in the first ODI. The following tour was to New Zealand in which Hauritz played both tests, maintaining economical spells with regular important strikes. Notably was having New Zealand batsmen Ross Taylor pad up to a ball that turned back in sharply to strike him in front of the stumps, out LBW.

Due to an ankle injury, Hauritz could not take part in the test series in the neutral grounded test series against Pakistan in England and Steven Smith, the legspinning all rounder filled in for the two matches. Hauritz recovered from his injury to tour India the following tour, however bad lucked combined with mediocre bowling at times resulted in a poor series for Hauritz which India won 2–0. There was criticism over his ability against the Indian batsmen, who are notably good players of spin. Ironically Hauritz has a great record against Pakistan who are also considered excellent players of spin.

Upon the return to Australia Hauritz found himself out of favour with the selectors with a focus on left arm spin becoming more apparent. Left arm Spinner Xavier Doherty was given one day international experience, taking 4 wickets. Hauritz was then left out of the first test at Brisbane for the 2010–11 Ashes series, a series in which he was a certainty to play in favour of Xavier Doherty.

Nathan Hauritz returned to First Class Cricket for NSW and begun participating in the Sheffield Shield, hoping to gain a test recall. He was a strong contributor for the side notching his maiden first class hundred, 146, breaking a long-standing record for the most runs by a night watchmen in the Sheffield Shield and then followed that up with another hundred in the following game. He was also the shield's leading spinner at this stage with the ball taking 19 wickets at 26.78 including a career best 5/39 and match figures of 7/104 at the WACA. There were calls for an "S.O.S" style test recall as Xavier Doherty performed miserably however the selectors included uncapped spinner Michael Beer for the Sydney Test despite Hauritz's better performances. At the end of the summer Hauritz was recalled to the ODI match against England in Hobart. His regain to form had Hauritz set for a World Cup berth but he dislocated his shoulder in the outfield while fielding a ball at Hobart, which subsequently needed a full shoulder reconstruction, ruling him out of competitive cricket for some time.

Hauritz's domestic season was not prosperous for NSW in the 2011–12 season, with NSW sitting last on the Sheffield Shield ladder. Hauritz moved back to his original State, Queensland with fellow NSW batsmen Usman Khawaja.

== Life after cricket ==
Hauritz now works as a cricket coach and consultant at schools. He coaches at Brisbane cricket club Northern Suburbs He lives in Bulimba. Nathan Haurtiz was spin bowling coach of Ireland Men's cricket team till July 2023.

== Career best performances ==
	Bowling			
	Score	Fixture	Venue	Season
Test	5/53	Australia v Pakistan	SCG	2009/10
ODI	4/29	Australia v South Africa	Kingsmead, Durban	2008/09
T20I	1/20	Australia v Pakistan	Dubai International Cricket Stadium	2009
FC	5/39	New South Wales v Western Australia	WACA, Perth	2010/11
LA	4/29	Australia v South Africa	Kingsmead, Durban	2008/09
T20	3/18	Brisbane Heat v Melbourne Stars	Gabba, Brisbane	2011/12

Sporting positions
Preceded by Cameron Cuffy	Nelson Cricket Club professional 2005	Succeeded by Robin Peterson
