= 2013–14 Melbourne Stars season =

Melbourne Stars
2013–14 season
- Coach: (Australia) Greg Shipperd
- Captain(s): (Australia) Cameron White
- Home ground: Melbourne Cricket Ground, Melbourne
- BBL: 1st
- BBL Finals: Semi–Finals
- Leading Run Scorer: (England) Luke Wright (288)
- Leading Wicket Taker: (Australia) Jackson Bird (13) (Australia) John Hastings (13)
- Highest home attendance: 25,266 vs Renegades (20 December 2013)
- Lowest home attendance: 12,506 vs Hurricanes (4 February 2014)
- Average home attendance: 19,951

The 2013–14 Melbourne Stars season was the third in the club's history. Coached by Greg Shipperd and captained by Cameron White, they competed in the BBL's 2013–14 season.

== Season ==
=== Ladder ===
Pos	Team	Pld	W	L	NR	Pts	NRR	Qualification
1	Melbourne Stars	8	8	0	0	16	2.189	Advanced to semi-finals
2	Sydney Sixers	8	6	2	0	12	−0.218	Advanced to semi-finals
3	Perth Scorchers (C)	8	5	3	0	10	−0.064	Advanced to semi-finals
4	Hobart Hurricanes	8	3	4	1	7	0.321	Advanced to semi-finals
5	Brisbane Heat	8	3	5	0	6	−0.197	
6	Melbourne Renegades	8	3	5	0	6	−0.475	
7	Adelaide Strikers	8	2	5	1	5	−0.933	
8	Sydney Thunder	8	1	7	0	2	−0.654	

(C) Champions

=== Regular season ===
20 December 2013
19:40 (D/N)
Scorecard

(H) Melbourne Stars; 7/208 (20 overs)	v	Melbourne Renegades; 132 (17.3 overs)
Luke Wright 70 (32); Nathan Rimmington 2/34 (4 overs)		Jos Buttler 49 (28); Jackson Bird 4/31 (4 overs)

Melbourne Stars won by 76 runs
Melbourne Cricket Ground
Attendance: 25,266
Umpires: Simon Fry and John Ward
Player of the match: Luke Wright (Stars)

- Melbourne Renegades won the toss and elected to field.

29 December 2013
19:10 (D/N)
Scorecard

Melbourne Stars; 5/200 (20 overs)	v	Sydney Sixers (H); 9/123 (20 overs)
David Hussey 50* (41); Josh Hazlewood 3/20 (4 overs)		Michael Lumb 29 (19); Glenn Maxwell 3/26 (4 overs)

Melbourne Stars won by 77 runs
Sydney Cricket Ground, Sydney
Attendance: 20,368
Umpires: Ashley Barrow and Michael Graham-Smith
Player of the match: Glenn Maxwell (Stars)

- Sydney Sixers won the toss and elected to field.

1 January 2014
19:40 (D/N)
Scorecard

(H) Sydney Thunder; 6/155 (20 overs)	v	Melbourne Stars; 3/156 (19.1 overs)
Michael Hussey 66 (48); John Hastings 3/31 (4 overs)		Brad Hodge 64* (36); Dirk Nannes 1/15 (4 overs)

Melbourne Stars won by 7 wickets
ANZ Stadium, Sydney
Attendance: 10,902
Umpires: Gerard Abood and Michael Graham-Smith
Player of the match: Brad Hodge (Stars)

- Sydney Thunder won the toss and elected to bat.

4 January 2014
19:10 (D/N)
Scorecard

(H) Melbourne Renegades; 5/163 (20 overs)	v	Melbourne Stars; 1/167 (16.2 overs)
Aaron Finch 84* (55); Jackson Bird 3/24 (4 overs)		Cameron White 84* (49); Aaron O'Brien 1/38 (3 overs)

Melbourne Stars won by 9 wickets
Etihad Stadium, Melbourne
Attendance: 42,837
Umpires: Ashley Barrow and Tony Ward
Player of the match: Cameron White (Stars)

- Melbourne Renegades won the toss and elected to bat.

9 January 2014
19:40 (D/N)
Scorecard

Adelaide Strikers; 9/90 (20 overs)	v	Melbourne Stars (H); 2/91 (7.3 overs)
Michael Klinger 42 (49); James Faulkner 3/9 (4 overs)		Luke Wright 49 (20); Michael Neser 2/21 (1.3 overs)

Melbourne Stars won by 8 wickets
Melbourne Cricket Ground
Attendance: 24,344
Umpires: Michael Graham-Smith and Geoff Joshua
Player of the match: James Faulkner (Stars)

- Adelaide Strikers won the toss and elected to bat.

11 January 2014
18:10 (D/N)
Scorecard

(H) Brisbane Heat; 7/144 (20 overs)	v	Melbourne Stars; 7/149 (19.4 overs)
Daniel Christian 68 (48); Lasith Malinga 2/21 (4 overs)		Luke Wright 37 (33); James Hopes 3/23 (4 overs)

Melbourne Stars won by 3 wickets
The Gabba, Woolloongabba, Brisbane
Attendance: 32,696
Umpires: Ashley Barrow and Paul Wilson
Player of the match: Luke Wright (Stars)

- Brisbane Heat won the toss and elected to bat

21 January 2014
19:40 (D/N)
Scorecard

Hobart Hurricanes; 9/131 (20 overs)	v	Melbourne Stars (H); 5/135 (19.1 overs)
Travis Birt 31 (23); Marcus Stoinis 2/12 (2 overs)		Luke Wright 52 (36); Ben Laughlin 2/28 (4 overs)

Melbourne Stars won by 5 wickets
Melbourne Cricket Ground
Attendance: 21,443
Umpires: Ian Lock and Sam Nogajski
Player of the match: Luke Wright (Stars)

- Melbourne Stars won the toss and elected to field.

27 January 2014
13:50
Scorecard

(H) Melbourne Stars; 6/161 (20 overs)	v	Perth Scorchers; 9/141 (20 overs)
Brad Hodge 61 (43); Michael Beer 2/27 (4 overs)		Simon Katich 30 (23); John Hastings 3/20 (4 overs)

Melbourne Stars won by 20 runs
Melbourne Cricket Ground
Attendance: 16,198
Umpires: Gerard Abood (Aus) and Geoff Joshua (Aus)
Player of the match: John Hastings (Stars)

- Melbourne Stars won the toss and elected to bat.

=== Semi-finals ===
Semi-final
4 February 2014
19:45 (D/N)
Scorecard

(H) Melbourne Stars; 8/141 (20 overs)	v	Hobart Hurricanes; 3/142 (18.1 overs)
Brad Hodge 51 (35); Cameron Boyce 3/11 (3 overs)		Tim Paine 65 (52); John Hastings 1/26 (3.1 overs)

Hobart Hurricanes won by 7 wickets
Melbourne Cricket Ground
Attendance: 12,506
Umpires: Gerard Abood and Tony Ward
Player of the match: Cameron Boyce (Hurricanes)

- Melbourne Stars won the toss and elected to bat.

== Team information ==
=== Squad ===
Players with international caps are listed in bold.

S/N	Name	Nat.	Date of birth (age)	Batting style	Bowling style	Notes
Batsmen
7	Brad Hodge	(Australia)	29 December 1974 (age 50)	Right-handed	Right Arm off spin	
9	Cameron White	(Australia)	18 August 1983 (age 42)	Right-handed	Right arm leg break	Captain
8	David Hussey	(Australia)	15 July 1977 (age 48)	Right-handed	Right arm off spin	
21	Robert Quiney	(Australia)	20 August 1982 (age 43)	Left-handed	Right arm medium	
2	Ben Abbatangelo	(Australia)	12 August 1993 (age 32)	Right-handed	Right Arm off spin	Rookie contract
All-rounders
6	Luke Wright	(England)	7 March 1985 (age 40)	Right-handed	Right arm fast medium	Visa contract
5	James Faulkner	(Australia)	29 April 1990 (age 35)	Right-handed	Left arm fast medium	
3	Mohammad Hafeez	(Pakistan)	17 October 1980 (age 44)	Right-handed	Right-arm off break	Visa contract
32	Glenn Maxwell	(Australia)	14 October 1988 (age 36)	Right-handed	Right arm off spin	
11	John Hastings	(Australia)	4 November 1985 (age 39)	Right-handed	Right arm fast medium	
16	Marcus Stoinis	(Australia)	16 August 1989 (age 36)	Right-handed	Right arm medium	
10	Alexander Keath	(Australia)	20 January 1992 (age 33)	Right-handed	Right arm medium	
Wicketkeepers
54	Peter Handscomb	(Australia)	26 April 1991 (age 34)	Right-handed	–	
13	Matthew Wade	(Australia)	26 December 1987 (age 37)	Left-handed	Right arm medium	
Pace bowlers
22	Jackson Bird	(Australia)	11 December 1986 (age 38)	Right-handed	Right arm fast medium	
15	Clint McKay	(Australia)	22 February 1983 (age 42)	Right-handed	Right arm fast medium	International Cap
99	Lasith Malinga	(Sri Lanka)	28 August 1983 (age 42)	Right	Right-arm fast	Visa contract
17	Daniel Worrall	(Australia)	10 July 1991 (age 34)	Right-handed	Right arm fast medium	
25	Scott Boland	(Australia)	11 April 1989 (age 36)	Right-handed	Right arm fast medium	
4	Guy Walker	(Australia)	12 September 1995 (age 30)	Right-handed	Right arm fast medium	
Spin bowlers
67	James Muirhead	(Australia)	30 July 1993 (age 32)	Right-handed	Right-arm leg spin	
37	Clive Rose	(Australia)	13 October 1989 (age 35)	Right-handed	Left-arm orthodox	

=== Home attendance ===
Game	Opponent	Attendance
1	Melbourne Renegades	25,266
5	Adelaide Strikers	24,344
7	Hobart Hurricanes	21,443
8	Perth Scorchers	16,198
SF	Hobart Hurricanes	12,506
**Total Attendance**		**99,757**
Average Attendance		19,951
