= 2014–15 Melbourne Stars season =

Australian cricket team

Melbourne Stars
2014–15 season
- Coach: (Australia) Greg Shipperd
- Captain(s): (Australia) Cameron White
- Home ground: Melbourne Cricket Ground, Melbourne
- BBL: 3rd
- BBL Finals: Semi–Finals
- Leading Run Scorer: (England) Kevin Pietersen (293)
- Leading Wicket Taker: (Australia) John Hastings (16)
- Highest home attendance: 37,323 vs Renegades (10 January 2015)
- Lowest home attendance: 18,284 vs Hurricanes (20 December 2014)
- Average home attendance: 27,871

The 2014–15 Melbourne Stars season was the fourth in the club's history. Coached by Greg Shipperd and captained by Cameron White, they competed in the BBL's 2014–15 season.

== Season ==
=== Ladder ===
Pos	Team	Pld	W	L	NR	Pts	NRR	Qualification
1	Adelaide Strikers	8	6	1	1	13	1.159	Advanced to semi-finals
2	Perth Scorchers (C)	8	5	3	0	10	0.705	Advanced to semi-finals
3	Melbourne Stars	8	5	3	0	10	0.336	Advanced to semi-finals
4	Sydney Sixers	8	5	3	0	10	−0.014	Advanced to semi-finals
5	Hobart Hurricanes	8	3	5	0	6	−0.280	
6	Melbourne Renegades	8	3	5	0	6	−0.331	
7	Sydney Thunder	8	2	5	1	5	−0.485	
8	Brisbane Heat	8	2	6	0	4	−1.116	

(C) Champions

=== Regular season ===
18 December 2014
19:10 (D/N)
Scorecard

Melbourne Stars; 7/148 (20 overs)	v	Adelaide Strikers (H); 2/149 (12.3 overs)
Kevin Pietersen 66 (46)1; Kane Richardson 2/20 (3 overs)		Tim Ludeman 92* (44); John Hastings 2/31 (2.3 overs)

Adelaide Strikers won by 8 wickets
Adelaide Oval
Attendance: 27,635
Umpires: Michael Graham-Smith and John Ward
Player of the match: Tim Ludeman (Strikers)

- Melbourne Stars won the toss and elected to bat
- Tim Ludeman (Strikers) scored the fastest fifty (18 balls) in the Big Bash League to this point

20 December 2014
19:10 (D/N)
Scorecard

Hobart Hurricanes; 5/190 (20 overs)	v	Melbourne Stars (H); 9/138 (20 overs)
Jonathan Wells 68 (44); John Hastings 3/24 (4 overs)		Cameron White 62 (48); Ben Hilfenhaus 4/27 (4 overs)

Hobart Hurricanes won by 52 runs
Melbourne Cricket Ground
Attendance: 18,284
Umpires: Mick Martell and Geoff Joshua
Player of the match: Darren Sammy (Hurricanes)

- Melbourne Stars won the toss and elected to field

28 December 2014
18:10 (D/N)
Scorecard

(H) Brisbane Heat; 8/164 (20 overs)	v	Melbourne Stars; 7/163 (20 overs)
Chris Lynn 48 (34); James Faulkner 2/26 (4 overs)		Rob Quiney 45* (31); Ryan Duffield 3/28 (4 overs)

Brisbane Heat won by 1 run
The Gabba, Woolloongabba, Brisbane
Attendance: 26,733
Umpires: Michael Graham-Smith (Aus) and Damien Mealey (Aus)
Player of the match: Ryan Duffield (Heat)

- Melbourne Stars won the toss and elected to field

3 January 2015
19:10 (D/N)
Scorecard

Melbourne Stars; 6/169 (20 overs)	v	Melbourne Renegades (H); 57 (12.4 overs)
Luke Wright 39 (21); Dwayne Bravo 3/22 (3 overs)		Tom Cooper 10 (15); Michael Beer 2/14 (4 overs)

Melbourne Stars won by 112 runs
Etihad Stadium, Melbourne
Attendance: 33,734
Umpires: Geoff Joshua and Paul Wilson
Player of the match: Michael Beer (Stars)

- Melbourne Renegades won the toss and elected to field
- Melbourne Renegades score of 57 was the lowest score in BBL history

5 January 2015
19:10 (D/N)
Scorecard

Sydney Sixers; 6/150 (20 overs)	v	Melbourne Stars (H); 4/150 (20 overs)
Michael Lumb 80 (61); Scott Boland 2/19 (4 overs)		Kevin Pietersen 54 (43); Ben Dwarshuis 2/31 (4 overs)

Scores level;Stars won the Super Over
Melbourne Cricket Ground
Attendance: 22,098
Umpires: Sam Nojagski and Paul Wilson
Player of the match: James Faulkner (Stars)

- Melbourne Stars won the toss and elected to field

10 January 2015
19:10 (D/N)
Scorecard

Melbourne Renegades; 6/153 (20 overs)	v	Melbourne Stars (H); 7/154 (20 overs)
Matthew Wade 71 (49); James Faulkner 3/19 (3 overs)		Glenn Maxwell 66 (44); Ben Stokes 2/22 (2 overs)

Melbourne Stars won by 3 wickets
Melbourne Cricket Ground
Attendance: 37,323
Umpires: Mick Martell and Shawn Craig
Player of the match: Glenn Maxwell (Stars)

- Melbourne Renegades won the toss and elected to bat

17 January 2015
19:10 (D/N)
Scorecard

(H) Sydney Thunder; 8/106 (20 overs)	v	Melbourne Stars; 2/107 (14.3 overs)
Aiden Blizzard 45 (48); Michael Beer 2/14 (4 overs)		Kevin Pietersen 67* (42); Josh Lalor 1/18 (2 overs)

Melbourne Stars won by 8 wickets
Sydney Showground Stadium
Attendance: 14,469
Umpires: Rod Tucker and Damien Mealey
Player of the match: Kevin Pietersen (Stars)

- Melbourne Stars won the toss and elected to field

21 January 2015
19:40 (D/N)
Scorecard

Perth Scorchers; 2/179 (20 overs)	v	Melbourne Stars (H); 7/182 (19.3 overs)
Shaun Marsh 79 (51); Michael Beer 1/38 (4 overs)		Peter Handscomb 103* (64); Yasir Arafat 4/27 (4 overs)

Melbourne Stars won by 3 wickets
Melbourne Cricket Ground
Attendance: 33,778
Umpires: Greg Davidson and Shawn Craig
Player of the match: Peter Handscomb (Stars)

- Perth Scorchers won the toss and elected to bat
- Melbourne Stars recorded the largest run chase in the BBL at the MCG

=== Semi-finals ===
Semi-final 2
25 January 2015
16:10 (D/N)
Scorecard

(H) Perth Scorchers; 7/144 (20 overs)	v	Melbourne Stars; 126 (19.5 overs)
Michael Carberry 50 (36); John Hastings 3/27 (4 overs)		Luke Wright 31 (25); Andrew Tye 4/18 (4 overs)

Perth Scorchers won by 18 runs
#TheFurnace, Perth
Attendance: 19,289
Umpires: Sam Nojagski and Geoff Joshua
Player of the match: Andrew Tye (Scorchers)

- Perth Scorchers won the toss and elected to bat

== Team information ==
=== Squad ===
Players with international caps are listed in bold.

S/N	Name	Nat.	Date of birth (age)	Batting style	Bowling style	Notes
Batsmen
24	Kevin Pietersen	(England)	27 June 1980 (age 46)	Right-handed	Right arm off spin	Visa contract
9	Cameron White	(Australia)	18 August 1983 (age 43)	Right-handed	Right arm leg break	Captain
8	David Hussey	(Australia)	15 July 1977 (age 49)	Right-handed	Right arm off spin	
21	Robert Quiney	(Australia)	20 August 1982 (age 44)	Left-handed	Right arm medium	
All-rounders
6	Luke Wright	(England)	7 March 1985 (age 41)	Right-handed	Right arm fast medium	Visa contract
5	James Faulkner	(Australia)	29 April 1990 (age 36)	Right-handed	Left arm fast medium	Vice-captain
32	Glenn Maxwell	(Australia)	14 October 1988 (age 38)	Right-handed	Right arm off spin	
11	John Hastings	(Australia)	4 November 1985 (age 41)	Right-handed	Right arm fast medium	
16	Marcus Stoinis	(Australia)	16 August 1989 (age 37)	Right-handed	Right arm medium	
10	Alexander Keath	(Australia)	20 January 1992 (age 34)	Right-handed	Right arm medium	
Wicketkeepers
54	Peter Handscomb	(Australia)	26 April 1991 (age 35)	Right-handed	–	
7	Tom Triffitt	(Australia)	13 November 1990 (age 36)	Right-handed	–	
Pace bowlers
22	Jackson Bird	(Australia)	11 December 1986 (age 39)	Right-handed	Right arm fast medium	
15	Clint McKay	(Australia)	22 February 1983 (age 43)	Right-handed	Right arm fast medium	International Cap
17	Daniel Worrall	(Australia)	10 July 1991 (age 35)	Right-handed	Right arm fast medium	
25	Scott Boland	(Australia)	11 April 1989 (age 37)	Right-handed	Right arm fast medium	
58	Luke Feldman	(Australia)	8 January 1981 (age 45)	Right-handed	Right arm fast medium	
Spin bowlers
19	Michael Beer	(Australia)	9 June 1984 (age 42)	Right-handed	Left arm orthodox	
37	Clive Rose	(Australia)	13 October 1989 (age 37)	Right-handed	Left-arm orthodox	

=== Home attendance ===
Game	Opponent	Attendance
2	Hobart Hurricanes	18,284
5	Sydney Sixers	22,098
6	Melbourne Renegades	37,323
8	Perth Scorchers	33,778
**Total Attendance**		**111,483**
Average Attendance		27,871
