= 2012–13 Melbourne Stars season =

Melbourne Stars
2012–13 season
- Coach: (Australia) Greg Shipperd
- Captain(s): (Australia) Shane Warne.
- Home ground: Melbourne Cricket Ground, Melbourne
- BBL: 3rd
- BBL Finals: Semi–Finals
- Leading Run Scorer: (Australia) Brad Hodge (342)
- Leading Wicket Taker: (Sri Lanka) Lasith Malinga (13)
- Highest home attendance: 46,581 vs Renegades (6 January 2013)
- Lowest home attendance: 11,184 vs Hurricanes (15 December 2012)
- Average home attendance: 13,684

The 2012–13 Melbourne Stars season was the second in the club's history. Coached by Greg Shipperd and captained by Shane Warne, they competed in the BBL's 2012–13 season.

== Season ==
=== Ladder ===
Pos	Team	Pld	W	L	NR	Pts	NRR	Qualification
1	Melbourne Renegades	8	7	1	0	14	0.791	Advanced to semi-finals
2	Perth Scorchers	8	5	3	0	10	1.322	Advanced to semi-finals
3	Melbourne Stars	8	5	3	0	10	0.246	Advanced to semi-finals
4	Brisbane Heat (C)	8	4	4	0	8	0.464	Advanced to semi-finals
5	Adelaide Strikers	8	4	4	0	8	−0.162	
6	Hobart Hurricanes	8	4	4	0	8	−0.569	
7	Sydney Sixers	8	3	5	0	6	−0.380	
8	Sydney Thunder	8	0	8	0	0	−1.360	

(C) Champions

=== Regular season ===
7 December 2012
19:00 (D/N)
Scorecard

Melbourne Stars; 5/167 (20 overs)	v	Melbourne Renegades (H); 2/168 (18.2 overs)
Luke Wright 95 (41); Aaron O'Brien 2/27 (4 overs)		Aaron Finch 111* (65); Jackson Bird 1/29 (4 overs)

Melbourne Renegades won by 8 wickets
Etihad Stadium, Melbourne
Attendance: 23,589
Umpires: Simon Fry & Paul Reiffel
Player of the match: Aaron Finch (Melbourne Renegades)

- Melbourne Stars won the toss and elected to bat

12 December 2012
17:00 (D/N)
Scorecard

(H) Perth Scorchers; 69 (15.2 overs)	v	Melbourne Stars; 0/29 (2.0 overs)
Hilton Cartwright 17 (16); Lasith Malinga 6/7 (4 overs)		Luke Wright 23* (11)

Melbourne Stars won by 10 wickets (D/L)
WACA Ground, Perth
Attendance: 4,329
Umpires: Ian Lock & John Ward
Player of the match: Lasith Malinga (Melbourne Stars)

- Melbourne Stars won the toss and elected to field
- Twenty20 debuts: Peter Handscomb (Melbourne Stars), Hilton Cartwright & Marcus Stoinis (Perth Scorchers)

15 December 2012
19:00 (D/N)
Scorecard

Hobart Hurricanes; 8/134 (20 overs)	v	Melbourne Stars (H); 6/135 (19.1 overs)
Tim Paine 46 (46); Clint McKay 3/24 (4 overs)		Rob Quiney 35 (31); Ben Laughlin 3/14 (4 overs)

Melbourne Stars won by 4 wickets
Melbourne Cricket Ground
Attendance: 11,184
Umpires: Geoff Joshua & Mick Martell
Player of the match: Clint McKay (Melbourne Stars)

- Melbourne Stars won the toss and elected to field

21 December 2012
19:00 (D/N)
Scorecard

(H) Melbourne Stars; 6/177 (20 overs)	v	Sydney Sixers; 5/156 (20 overs)
Glenn Maxwell 82 (50); Ian Moran 3/30 (3 overs)		Steve O'Keefe 42 (35); Shane Warne 2/32 (4 overs)

Melbourne Stars won by 21 runs
Melbourne Cricket Ground, Melbourne
Attendance: 14,260
Umpires: Ashley Barrow & Tony Ward
Player of the match: Glenn Maxwell (Melbourne Stars)

- Sydney Sixers won the toss and elected to field
- Twenty20 debut: Scott Henry (Melbourne Stars)

27 December 2012
19:00 (D/N)
Scorecard

Melbourne Stars; 8/175 (20 overs)	v	Adelaide Strikers (H); 4/167 (20 overs)
Brad Hodge 88 (58); Shaun Tait 2/36 (4 overs)		Kieron Pollard 65* (43); James Faulkner 2/32 (4 overs)

Melbourne Stars won by 8 runs
Adelaide Oval
Attendance: 15,344
Umpires: Geoff Joshua & Ian Lock
Player of the match: Brad Hodge (Melbourne Stars)

- Melbourne Stars won the toss and elected to bat
- Twenty20 debut: Clive Rose (Melbourne Stars)

3 January 2013
19:00 (D/N)
Scorecard

(H) Brisbane Heat; 5/171 (20 overs)	v	Melbourne Stars; 9/147 (20 overs)
James Hopes 49 (40); Lasith Malinga 3/26 (4 overs)		Luke Wright 34 (30); Thisara Perera 3/18 (2 overs)

Brisbane Heat won by 24 runs
The Gabba, Woolloongabba, Brisbane
Attendance: 24,570
Umpires: Ian Lock & Mick Martell
Player of the match: James Hopes (Brisbane)

- Melbourne Stars won the toss and elected to field

6 January 2013
19:00 (D/N)
Scorecard

(H) Melbourne Stars; 9/146 (20 overs)	v	Melbourne Renegades; 1/147 (18.5 overs)
Luke Wright 29 (22); Will Sheridan 3/36 (4 overs)		Aaron Finch 67* (47); Shane Warne 1/24 (4 overs)

Melbourne Renegades won by 9 wickets
Melbourne Cricket Ground, Melbourne
Attendance: 46,581
Umpires: Sam Nogajski & Simon Fry
Player of the match: Aaron Finch (Melbourne Renegades)

- Melbourne Stars won the toss and elected to bat

8 January 2013
19:00 (D/N)
Scorecard

(H) Melbourne Stars; 8/145 (20 overs)	v	Sydney Thunder; 132 (19.4 overs)
Brad Hodge 39 (26); Chris Gayle 2/5 (1 over)		Chris Gayle 65 (43); James Faulkner 3/24 (3.4 overs)

Melbourne Stars won by 13 runs
Melbourne Cricket Ground Melbourne
Attendance: 13,680
Umpires: Geoff Joshua & Mick Martell
Player of the match: Chris Gayle (Sydney Thunder)

- Melbourne Stars won the toss and elected to bat

=== Semi-finals ===
16 January 2013
17:00 (D/N)
Scorecard

Melbourne Stars; 2/183 (18 overs)	v	Perth Scorchers (H); 2/142 (13 overs)
Cameron White 88 (53); Nathan Coulter-Nile 1/24 (4 overs)		Shaun Marsh 68 (40); James Faulkner 1/22 (3 overs)

Perth Scorchers won by 8 wickets (D/L)
WACA Ground, Perth
Attendance: 17,903
Umpires: Simon Fry & Mick Martell
Player of the match: Shaun Marsh (Perth)

- Perth Scorchers won the toss and elected to field.
- Rain first reduced the match to 18 overs per side. It then reduced the Perth Scorchers' innings to 13 overs with a target of 139 runs according to the Duckworth–Lewis method.
- Twenty20 debut: Alex Keath (Melbourne Stars)

== Team information ==
=== Squad ===
S/N	Name	Nat.	Date of birth (age)	Batting style	Bowling style	Notes
Batsmen
7	Brad Hodge	(Australia)	29 December 1974 (age 51)	Right-handed	Right Arm off spin	
9	Cameron White	(Australia)	18 August 1983 (age 43)	Right-handed	Right arm leg break	
8	David Hussey	(Australia)	15 July 1977 (age 49)	Right-handed	Right arm off spin	
21	Robert Quiney	(Australia)	20 August 1982 (age 44)	Left-handed	Right arm medium	
14	Scott Henry	(Australia)	14 February 1989 (age 37)	Left-handed	Slow left-arm orthodox	
All-rounders
6	Luke Wright	(England)	7 March 1985 (age 41)	Right-handed	Right arm fast medium	Visa contract
5	James Faulkner	(Australia)	29 April 1990 (age 36)	Right-handed	Left arm fast medium	
32	Glenn Maxwell	(Australia)	14 October 1988 (age 37)	Right-handed	Right arm off spin	
11	John Hastings	(Australia)	4 November 1985 (age 40)	Right-handed	Right arm fast medium	
10	Alexander Keath	(Australia)	20 January 1992 (age 34)	Right-handed	Right arm medium	
Wicketkeepers
54	Peter Handscomb	(Australia)	26 April 1991 (age 35)	Right-handed	–	
13	Matthew Wade	(Australia)	26 December 1987 (age 38)	Left-handed	Right arm medium	
Pace bowlers
22	Jackson Bird	(Australia)	11 December 1986 (age 39)	Right-handed	Right arm fast medium	
15	Clint McKay	(Australia)	22 February 1983 (age 43)	Right-handed	Right arm fast medium	International Cap
99	Lasith Malinga	(Sri Lanka)	28 August 1983 (age 43)	Right	Right-arm fast	Visa contract
19	James Pattinson	(Australia)	3 May 1990 (age 36)	Left-handed	Right arm fast medium	
Spin bowlers
23	Shane Warne	(Australia)	13 September 1969 (age 57)	Right-handed	Right-arm leg spin	Captain
37	Clive Rose	(Australia)	13 October 1989 (age 36)	Right-handed	Left-arm orthodox	

=== Home attendance ===
Game	Opponent	Attendance
3	Hobart Hurricanes	11,184
4	Sydney Sixers	14,260
7	Melbourne Renegades	46,581
8	Sydney Thunder	13,680
Total Attendance		85,705
Average Attendance		13,684
