= 2011–12 Melbourne Stars season =

Melbourne Stars
2011–12 season
- Coach: (Australia) Greg Shipperd
- Captain(s): (Australia) Cameron White
- Home ground: Melbourne Cricket Ground, Melbourne
- BBL: 4th
- BBL Finals: Semi–Finals
- Leading Run Scorer: (Australia) David Hussey (243) (Australia) Robert Quiney (243)
- Leading Wicket Taker: (Australia) James Faulkner (13)
- Highest home attendance: 40,227 vs Renegades (7 January 2012)
- Lowest home attendance: 19,840 vs Scorchers (4 January 2012)
- Average home attendance: 27,424

The 2011–12 Melbourne Stars season was the first in the club's history. Coached by Greg Shipperd and captained by Cameron White, they competed in the BBL's inaugural season.

== Season ==
=== Ladder ===
Pos	Team	Pld	W	L	NR	Pts	NRR	Qualification
1	Perth Scorchers	7	5	2	0	10	0.626	Advanced to semi-finals
2	Hobart Hurricanes	7	5	2	0	10	0.569	Advanced to semi-finals
3	Sydney Sixers (C)	7	5	2	0	10	0.262	Advanced to semi-finals
4	Melbourne Stars	7	4	3	0	8	0.254	Advanced to semi-finals
5	Brisbane Heat	7	3	4	0	6	0.324	
6	Adelaide Strikers	7	2	5	0	4	−0.338	
7	Melbourne Renegades	7	2	5	0	4	−0.582	
8	Sydney Thunder	7	2	5	0	4	−1.250	

(C) Champions

=== Regular season ===
17 December 2011
19:00 (D/N)
Scorecard

(H) Melbourne Stars; 7/153 (20 overs)	v	Sydney Thunder; 4/154 (19 overs)
David Hussey 52 (27); Doug Bollinger 2/22 (3 overs)		David Warner 102* (52); James Faulkner 2/20 (4 overs)

Sydney Thunder won by 6 wickets
Melbourne Cricket Ground
Attendance: 23,496
Umpires: Simon Fry and Paul Wilson
Player of the match: David Warner (Sydney Thunder)

- Sydney Thunder won the toss and elected to field.

20 December 2011
18:30 (D/N)
Scorecard

Melbourne Stars; 7/177 (20 overs)	v	Brisbane Heat (H); 7/169 (20 overs)
Robert Quiney 97 (60); Nathan Hauritz 3/18 (4 Overs)		Brendon McCullum 36 (25); Clint McKay 3/22 (4 Overs)

Melbourne Stars won by 8 runs
The Gabba
Attendance: 29,241
Umpires: Paul Reiffel and Ian Lock
Player of the match: Robert Quiney

- Melbourne Stars won the toss and elected to bat.

27 December 2011
19:00 (D/N)
Scorecard

(H) Sydney Sixers; 9/166 (20 overs)	v	Melbourne Stars; 8/164 (20 overs)
Dwayne Bravo 51 (39); Clint McKay 2/35 (4 overs)		David Hussey 42 (30); Steve Smith 2/27 (4 overs)

Sydney Sixers won by 2 runs
Sydney Cricket Ground
Attendance: 27,520
Umpires: Gerard Abood and Bruce Oxenford
Player of the match: Dwayne Bravo

- Sydney Sixers won the toss and elected to bat.

4 January 2012
19:00 (D/N)
Scorecard

Perth Scorchers; 136 (20 overs)	v	Melbourne Stars (H); 5/128 (20 overs)
Herschelle Gibbs 69 (48); James Faulkner 3/17 (4 overs)		Matthew Wade 53* (43); Nathan Coulter-Nile 2/20 (3 overs)

Perth Scorchers won by 8 runs
Melbourne Cricket Ground
Attendance: 19,840
Umpires: Mick Martell and Paul Wilson
Player of the match: Herschelle Gibbs (Perth Scorchers)

- Perth Scorchers won the toss and elected to bat.

7 January 2012
19:00 (D/N)
Scorecard

(H) Melbourne Stars; 5/167 (20 overs)	v	Melbourne Renegades; 3/58 (8.1 overs)
David Hussey 51 (42); Shahid Afridi 2/20 (4 overs)		Glenn Maxwell 28 (24); Shane Warne 1/4 (1 over)

Melbourne Stars won by 11 runs (D/L)
Melbourne Cricket Ground
Attendance: 40,227
Umpires: Simon Fry and Geoff Joshua
Player of the match: David Hussey (Melbourne Stars)

- Melbourne Stars won the toss and elected to bat.
- Rain ended the match during the Melbourne Renegades' innings after 8.1 overs. Their target was 70 runs according to the Duckworth–Lewis method.

9 January 2012
19:00 (D/N)
Scorecard

Melbourne Stars; 3/203 (20 overs)	v	(H) Hobart Hurricanes; 9/184 (20 overs)
Luke Wright 117 (60); Naved-ul-Hasan 2/38 (4 overs)		Owais Shah 55 (37); James Faulkner 4/46 (4 overs)

Melbourne Stars won by 19 runs
Blundstone Arena
Attendance: 13,713
Umpires: Geoff Joshua and John Ward
Player of the match: Luke Wright (Melbourne Stars)

- Melbourne Stars won the toss and elected to bat.

19 January 2012
19:00 (D/N)
Scorecard

Adelaide Strikers; 125 (19.3 overs)	v	Melbourne Stars (H); 4/129 (18.5 overs)
Callum Ferguson 41 (29); Clint McKay 3/17 (4 overs)		David Hussey 41* (36); James Franklin 2/21 (3 overs)

Melbourne Stars won by 6 wickets
Melbourne Cricket Ground
Attendance: 26,133
Umpires: Ian Lock and Bob Parry
Player of the match: Clint McKay (Melbourne Stars)

- Adelaide Strikers won the toss and elected to bat

=== Semi-finals ===
21 January 2012
17:00 (D/N)
Scorecard

(H) Perth Scorchers; 3/174 (20 overs)	v	Melbourne Stars; 8/163 (20 overs)
Herschelle Gibbs 71 (46); Luke Wright 1/14 (2 overs)		James Faulkner 38 (27); Brad Hogg 2/17 (4 overs)

Perth Scorchers won by 11 runs
WACA Ground
Attendance: 15,225
Umpires: Simon Fry and John Ward
Player of the match: Mitchell Marsh (Perth Scorchers)

- Perth Scorchers won the toss and elected to bat

== Team information ==
=== Squad ===
S/N	Name	Nat.	Date of birth (age)	Batting style	Bowling style	Notes
Batsmen
10	George Bailey	(Australia)	7 September 1982 (age 42)	Right-handed	Right-arm medium	International Cap
9	Cameron White	(Australia)	18 August 1983 (age 41)	Right-handed	Right arm leg break	Captain
8	David Hussey	(Australia)	15 July 1977 (age 47)	Right-handed	Right arm off spin	
21	Robert Quiney	(Australia)	20 August 1982 (age 42)	Left-handed	Right arm medium	
17	Adam Voges	(Australia)	4 October 1979 (age 45)	Right-handed	Slow left-arm	
All-rounders
6	Luke Wright	(England)	7 March 1985 (age 40)	Right-handed	Right arm fast medium	Visa contract
5	James Faulkner	(Australia)	29 April 1990 (age 34)	Right-handed	Left arm fast medium	
83	Chris Simpson	(Australia)	1 September 1982 (age 42)	Right-handed	Right arm off spin	
11	John Hastings	(Australia)	4 November 1985 (age 39)	Right-handed	Right arm fast medium	
10	Alexander Keath	(Australia)	20 January 1992 (age 33)	Right-handed	Right arm medium	
Wicketkeepers
13	Matthew Wade	(Australia)	26 December 1987 (age 37)	Left-handed	Right arm medium	
Pace bowlers
22	Jackson Bird	(Australia)	11 December 1986 (age 38)	Right-handed	Right arm fast medium	
15	Clint McKay	(Australia)	22 February 1983 (age 42)	Right-handed	Right arm fast medium	International Cap
20	Peter Siddle	(Australia)	25 November 1984 (age 40)	Right-handed	Right-arm fast medium	International Cap
16	Jade Dernbach	(England)	3 March 1986 (age 39)	Right-handed	Right-arm fast-medium	
19	James Pattinson	(Australia)	3 May 1990 (age 34)	Left-handed	Right arm fast medium	
Spin bowlers
23	Shane Warne	(Australia)	13 September 1969 (age 55)	Right-handed	Right-arm leg spin	Captain
25	Jon Holland	(Australia)	29 May 1987 (age 37)	Right-handed	Left-arm orthodox spin	International Cap

=== Home attendance ===
Game	Opponent	Attendance
1	Sydney Thunder	23,496
4	Perth Scorchers	19,840
5	Melbourne Renegades	40,227
7	Adelaide Strikers	26,133
Total Attendance		109,696
Average Attendance		27,424
