= 2017–18 Melbourne Stars season =

Melbourne Stars
2017–18 season
- Coach: (New Zealand) Stephen Fleming
- Captain(s): (Australia) John Hastings
- Home ground: Melbourne Cricket Ground, Melbourne
- BBL Season: 8th
- BBL Finals: DNQ
- Leading Run Scorer: (Australia) Glenn Maxwell (299)
- Leading Wicket Taker: (Australia) John Hastings (10)
- Highest home attendance: 48,086 vs Renegades (6 January 2018)
- Lowest home attendance: 19,671 vs Hurricanes (27 January 2018)
- Average home attendance: 31,628

The 2017–18 Melbourne Stars season was the seventh in the club's history. Coached by Stephen Fleming and captained by John Hastings, they competed in the BBL's 2017–18 season.

== Season ==
=== Ladder ===
Pos	Team	Pld	W	L	NR	Pts	NRR	Qualification
1	Perth Scorchers	10	8	2	0	16	0.154	Advanced to semi-finals
2	Adelaide Strikers (C)	10	7	3	0	14	0.801	Advanced to semi-finals
3	Melbourne Renegades	10	6	4	0	12	0.297	Advanced to semi-finals
4	Hobart Hurricanes	10	5	5	0	10	−0.291	Advanced to semi-finals
5	Sydney Sixers	10	4	6	0	8	0.331	
6	Sydney Thunder	10	4	6	0	8	−0.039	
7	Brisbane Heat	10	4	6	0	8	−0.437	
8	Melbourne Stars	10	2	8	0	4	−0.926	

(C) Champions

=== Regular season ===
20 December 2017
18:40 (D/N)
Scorecard

(H) Brisbane Heat; 7/206 (20 overs)	v	Melbourne Stars; 6/191 (20 overs)
Alex Ross 51 (36); Marcus Stoinis 3/38 (4 overs)		Marcus Stoinis 99 (51); Shadab Khan 2/41 (4 overs)

Brisbane Heat won by 15 runs
The Gabba, Brisbane
Attendance: 27,433
Umpires: Shawn Craig and John Ward
Player of the match: Marcus Stoinis (Melbourne Stars)

- Melbourne Stars won the toss and elected to field.
- Brendan Doggett (Brisbane Heat) made his T20 debut.

26 December 2017
16:10
Scorecard

(H) Perth Scorchers; 6/142 (20 overs)	v	Melbourne Stars; 8/129 (20 overs)
Hilton Cartwright 58 (53); James Faulkner 2/19 (3 overs)		James Faulkner 35* (31); Andrew Tye 5/23 (4 overs)

Perth Scorchers won by 13 runs
WACA Ground, Perth
Attendance: 19,506
Umpires: Simon Fry and Simon Lightbody
Player of the match: Hilton Cartwright (Perth Scorchers)

- Melbourne Stars won the toss and elected to field.

2 January 2018
19:10 (D/N)
Scorecard

(H) Melbourne Stars; 7/141 (20 overs)	v	Brisbane Heat; 1/144 (14.4 overs)
Glenn Maxwell 50 (39); Mitchell Swepson 3/14 (4 overs)		Chris Lynn 63* (46); Liam Bowe 1/21 (2 overs)

Brisbane Heat won by 9 wickets
Melbourne Cricket Ground, Melbourne
Attendance: 36,834
Umpires: Michael Graham-Smith and Geoff Joshua
Player of the match: Mitchell Swepson (Brisbane Heat)

- Brisbane Heat won the toss and elected to field

6 January 2018
19:10 (D/N)
Scorecard

(H) Melbourne Stars; 4/157 (20 overs)	v	Melbourne Renegades; 4/159 (17.5 overs)
Ben Dunk 47 (30); Mohammad Nabi 1/27 (4 overs)		Mohammad Nabi 52 (30); John Hastings 2/24 (3.5 overs)

Melbourne Renegades won by 6 wickets
Melbourne Cricket Ground, Melbourne
Attendance: 48,086
Umpires: Shawn Craig and John Ward
Player of the match: Mohammad Nabi (Melbourne Renegades)

- Melbourne Renegades won the toss and elected to field
- Jackson Coleman (Melbourne Stars) made his T20 debut.

9 January 2018
19:10 (D/N)
Scorecard

Melbourne Stars; 6/151 (20 overs)	v	Adelaide Strikers (H); 2/152 (18.4 overs)
Glenn Maxwell 60 (39); Rashid Khan 1/23 (4 overs)		Alex Carey 59* (52); Glenn Maxwell 1/24 (3 overs)

Adelaide Strikers won by 8 wickets
Adelaide Oval, Adelaide
Attendance: 42,624
Umpires: Phillip Gillespie and Tony Wilds
Player of the match: Travis Head (Adelaide Strikers)

- Melbourne Stars won the toss and elected to bat

12 January 2018
19:40 (D/N)
Scorecard

Melbourne Stars; 4/167 (20 overs)	v	Melbourne Renegades (H); 9/144 (20 overs)
Kevin Pietersen 74 (46); Mohammad Nabi 2/15 (4 overs)		Dwayne Bravo 26 (18); Jackson Coleman 3/27 (4 overs)

Melbourne Stars won by 23 runs
Etihad Stadium, Melbourne
Attendance: 44,316
Umpires: Michael Graham-Smith and Geoff Joshua
Player of the match: Kevin Pietersen (Melbourne Stars)

- Melbourne Renegades won the toss and elected to field
- Daniel Fallins (Melbourne Stars) made his T20 debut.

16 January 2018
19:40 (D/N)
Scorecard

(H) Melbourne Stars; 7/128 (20 overs)	v	Sydney Sixers; 2/129 (15.1 overs)
Glenn Maxwell 28 (16); Nathan Lyon 3/18 (4 overs)		Nic Maddinson 62 (31); Jackson Coleman 1/14 (1.1 overs)

Sydney Sixers won by 8 wickets
Melbourne Cricket Ground, Melbourne
Attendance: 26,130
Umpires: Shawn Craig and John Ward
Player of the match: Nathan Lyon (Sydney Sixers)

- Sydney Sixers won the toss and elected to field

20 January 2018
18:10 (D/N)
Scorecard

(H) Melbourne Stars; 6/147 (20 overs)	v	Sydney Thunder; 3/149 (16.1 overs)
Peter Handscomb 57 (44); Chris Green 2/27 (4 overs)		Shane Watson 49* (28); Liam Bowe 2/30 (4 overs)

Sydney Thunder won by 7 wickets
Melbourne Cricket Ground, Melbourne
Attendance: 27,421
Umpires: Greg Davidson and Simon Lightbody
Player of the match: Shane Watson (Sydney Thunder)

- Sydney Thunder won the toss and elected to field

23 January 2018
19:40 (D/N)
Scorecard

Melbourne Stars; 5/189 (20 overs)	v	Sydney Sixers (H); 5/190 (17.3 overs)
Glenn Maxwell 84 (47); Carlos Brathwaite 2/31 (4 overs)		Joe Denly 72* (45); Evan Gulbis 2/22 (3 overs)

Sydney Sixers won by 5 wickets
Sydney Cricket Ground, Sydney
Attendance: 17,145
Umpires: Phillip Gillespie and Tony Wilds
Player of the match: Joe Denly (Sydney Sixers)

- Sydney Sixers won the toss and elected to field

27 January 2018
16:10
Scorecard

Hobart Hurricanes; 7/185 (20 overs)	v	Melbourne Stars (H); 7/186 (19.1 overs)
Dan Christian 56 (37); John Hastings 2/41 (4 overs)		Kevin Pietersen 46 (23); Tymal Mills 2/56 (4 overs)

Melbourne Stars won by 3 wickets
Melbourne Cricket Ground, Melbourne
Attendance: 19,671
Umpires: Michael Graham-Smith and Geoff Joshua
Player of the match: Kevin Pietersen (Melbourne Stars)

- Melbourne Stars won the toss and elected to field

== Players ==
S/N	Name	Nat.	Date of birth	Batting style	Bowling style	Notes
Batsmen
21	Robert Quiney	(Australia)	20 August 1982 (age 44)	Left-handed	Right arm medium	International cap
24	Kevin Pietersen	(England)	27 June 1980 (age 46)	Right-handed	Right arm off spin	Visa contract and International Cap
All Rounders
4	Evan Gulbis	(Australia)	26 March 1986 (age 40)	Right-handed	Right arm fast medium	
5	James Faulkner	(Australia)	29 April 1990 (age 36)	Right-handed	Left arm fast medium	Vice-captain and International Cap
6	Luke Wright	(England)	7 March 1985 (age 41)	Right-handed	Right arm fast medium	Visa contract and International Cap
11	John Hastings	(Australia)	4 November 1985 (age 41)	Right-handed	Right arm fast medium	Captain and International Cap
16	Marcus Stoinis	(Australia)	16 August 1989 (age 37)	Right-handed	Right arm medium	International Cap
32	Glenn Maxwell	(Australia)	14 October 1988 (age 38)	Right-handed	Right arm off spin	International Cap
Wicketkeepers
2	Sam Harper	(Australia)	10 December 1996 (age 29)	Right-handed	—	
13	Seb Gotch	(Australia)	12 July 1993 (age 33)	Right-handed	—	
51	Ben Dunk	(Australia)	11 March 1987 (age 39)	Left-handed	—	International Cap
54	Peter Handscomb	(Australia)	26 April 1991 (age 35)	Right-handed	—	International Cap
Pace Bowlers
10	Jackson Coleman	(Australia)	18 December 1991 (age 34)	Right-handed	Left arm fast medium	
17	Daniel Worrall	(Australia)	10 July 1991 (age 35)	Right-handed	Right arm fast medium	International Cap
20	Ben Hilfenhaus	(Australia)	15 March 1983 (age 43)	Right-handed	Right arm fast medium	International Cap
25	Scott Boland	(Australia)	11 April 1989 (age 37)	Right-handed	Right arm fast medium	International Cap
Spin Bowlers
19	Michael Beer	(Australia)	9 June 1984 (age 42)	Right-handed	Left arm orthodox	International Cap
21	Daniel Fallins	(Australia)	12 August 1996 (age 30)	Right-handed	Right-arm leg break	
23	Liam Bowe	(Australia)	23 September 1997 (age 29)	Right-handed	Slow left-arm wrist-spin	
63	Adam Zampa	(Australia)	31 March 1992 (age 34)	Right-handed	Right arm leg break	International Cap

== Season statistics ==
=== Home attendance ===
Match	Opponent	Attendance
3	Brisbane Heat	36,834
4	Melbourne Renegades	48,086
7	Sydney Sixers	26,130
8	Sydney Thunder	27,421
10	Hobart Hurricanes	19,671
Total Attendance		158,142
Average Attendance		31,628
