= 2016–17 Melbourne Stars season =

Melbourne Stars
2016–17 season
- President: (Australia) Eddie McGuire
- Coach: (New Zealand) Stephen Fleming
- Captain(s): (Australia) David Hussey
- Home ground: Melbourne Cricket Ground, Melbourne
- BBL Season: 4th
- BBL Finals: Semi–Finals
- Leading Run Scorer: (England) Kevin Pietersen (268)
- Leading Wicket Taker: (Australia) Scott Boland (14)
- Highest home attendance: 71,162 vs Renegades (1 January 2017)
- Lowest home attendance: 40,225 vs Heat (17 January 2017)
- Average home attendance: 49,578

The 2016–17 Melbourne Stars season was the sixth in the club's history. Coached by Stephen Fleming and captained by David Hussey, they competed in the BBL's 2016–17 season.

== Season ==
=== Ladder ===
Pos	Team	Pld	W	L	NR	Pts	NRR	Qualification
1	Perth Scorchers (C)	8	5	3	0	10	0.618	Advanced to semi-finals
2	Brisbane Heat	8	5	3	0	10	0.516	Advanced to semi-finals
3	Sydney Sixers	8	5	3	0	10	−0.848	Advanced to semi-finals
4	Melbourne Stars	8	4	4	0	8	0.397	Advanced to semi-finals
5	Melbourne Renegades	8	4	4	0	8	0.042	
6	Adelaide Strikers	8	3	5	0	6	0.334	
7	Hobart Hurricanes	8	3	5	0	6	−0.530	
8	Sydney Thunder	8	3	5	0	6	−0.600	

(C) Champions

=== Regular season ===
26 December 2016
19:10 (D/N)
Scorecard

(H) Hobart Hurricanes; 4/188 (20 overs)	v	Melbourne Stars; 3/191 (17.4 overs)
Tim Paine 91 (61); Ben Hilfenhaus 3/38 (4 overs)		Rob Quiney 75 (43); Stuart Broad 2/35 (3.4 overs)

Melbourne Stars won by 7 wickets
Blundstone Arena
Attendance: 18,079
Umpires: Geoff Joshua and Paul Wilson
Player of the match: Rob Quiney (Stars)

- Hobart Hurricanes won the toss and elected to bat.
- Sam Harper (Stars) made his T20 debut.

1 January 2017
18:10 (D/N)
Scorecard

Melbourne Renegades; 4/171 (20 overs)	v	Melbourne Stars (H); 9/151 (18 overs)
Cameron White 64* (43); James Faulkner 1/19 (4 overs)		Luke Wright 45 (40); Brad Hogg 3/22 (4 overs)

Melbourne Renegades won by 7 runs (D/L)
Melbourne Cricket Ground
Attendance: 71,162
Umpires: Shawn Craig and Geoff Joshua
Player of the match: Brad Hogg (Renegades)

- Melbourne Stars won the toss and elected to field.
- Rain reduced the Stars innings to 18 overs with a revised target of 159.

4 January 2017
19:10 (D/N)
Scorecard

Melbourne Stars; 8/166 (20 overs)	v	Sydney Thunder (H); 4/168 (20 overs)
Kevin Pietersen 60 (37); Shane Watson 3/23 (4 overs)		Eoin Morgan 71* (50); Ben Hilfenhaus 2/39 (4 overs)

Sydney Thunder won by 6 wickets
Spotless Stadium
Attendance: 20,076
Umpires: Gerard Abood and Simon Fry
Player of the match: Eoin Morgan (Thunder)

- Sydney Thunder won the toss and elected to field.

7 January 2017
19:10 (D/N)
Scorecard

Melbourne Stars; 7/200 (20 overs)	v	Melbourne Renegades (H); 9/154 (20 overs)
Kevin Pietersen 73 (46); James Pattinson 3/44 (4 overs)		Cameron White 38 (29); Adam Zampa 3/19 (4 overs)

Melbourne Stars won by 46 runs
Etihad Stadium
Attendance: 44,189
Umpires: Geoff Joshua and Sam Nogajski
Player of the match: Adam Zampa (Stars)

- Melbourne Renegades won the toss and elected to field.
- The crowd of 44,189 is the highest ever for a cricket match at Etihad Stadium.

10 January 2017
19:40 (D/N)
Scorecard

Adelaide Strikers; 8/152 (20 overs)	v	Melbourne Stars (H); 8/153 (19.3 overs)
Ben Dunk 35 (25); Scott Boland 4/30 (4 overs)		Ben Hilfenhaus 32* (24); Ben Laughlin 3/19 (4 overs)

Melbourne Stars won by 2 wickets
Melbourne Cricket Ground
Attendance: 40,254
Umpires: John Ward and Paul Wilson
Player of the match: Ben Hilfenhaus (Stars)

- Melbourne Stars won the toss and elected to field.
- Liam Bowe (Stars) and Wes Agar (Strikers) both made their T20 debuts.

14 January 2017
18:15 (D/N)
Scorecard

(H) Perth Scorchers; 7/134 (20 overs)	v	Melbourne Stars; 3/137 (17.2 overs)
Andrew Tye 42 (33); Michael Beer 2/12 (4 overs)		Kevin Pietersen 44* (42); Jhye Richardson 2/26 (3 overs)

Melbourne Stars won by 7 wickets
#TheFurnace
Attendance: 21,171
Umpires: Geoff Joshua and Damien Mealey
Player of the match: Michael Beer (Stars)

- Perth Scorchers won the toss and elected to bat.

17 January 2017
19:40 (D/N)
Scorecard

(H) Melbourne Stars; 7/138 (20 overs)	v	Brisbane Heat; 3/139 (18.1 overs)
Luke Wright 60* (55); Mitchell Swepson 2/14 (4 overs)		Alex Ross 46* (40); Evan Gulbis 1/8 (1 over)

Brisbane Heat won by 7 wickets
Melbourne Cricket Ground
Attendance: 40,225
Umpires: Gerard Abood and Michael Graham-Smith
Player of the match: Mitchell Swepson (Heat)

- Melbourne Stars won the toss and elected to bat.
- Marnus Labuschagne (Heat) made his T20 debut.

21 January 2017
19:25 (D/N)
Scorecard

(H) Melbourne Stars; 8/156 (20 overs)	v	Sydney Sixers; 7/160 (19 overs)
Luke Wright 62 (47); Ben Dwarshuis 3/25 (4 overs)		Daniel Hughes 34 (33); Scott Boland 3/37 (4 overs)

Sydney Sixers won by 3 wickets
Melbourne Cricket Ground
Attendance: 46,671
Umpires: Ashley Barrow and Greg Davidson
Player of the match: Sean Abbott (Sixers)

- Sydney Sixers won the toss and elected to field.

=== Semi-finals ===
Semi-final 1
24 January 2017
16:40
Scorecard

Melbourne Stars; 8/136 (20 overs)	v	Perth Scorchers (H); 3/139 (16.5 overs)
Seb Gotch 48 (47); Mitchell Johnson 3/3 (4 overs)		Shaun Marsh 56* (44); Evan Gulbis 1/9 (1 over)

Perth Scorchers won by 7 wickets
#TheFurnace
Attendance: 19,977
Umpires: Shawn Craig and Sam Nogajski
Player of the match: Mitchell Johnson (Scorchers)

- Perth Scorchers won the toss and elected to field.
- Mitchell Johnson's figures of 3/3 is the most economical completed spell in BBL history.

== Players ==
S/N	Name	Nat.	Date of birth	Batting style	Bowling style	Notes
Batsmen
24	Kevin Pietersen	(England)	27 June 1980 (age 44)	Right-handed	Right arm off spin	Visa contract & International Cap
12	Seb Gotch	(Australia)	12 July 1993 (age 31)	Right-handed	—	
8	David Hussey	(Australia)	15 July 1977 (age 47)	Right-handed	Right arm off spin	Captain
21	Robert Quiney	(Australia)	20 August 1982 (age 42)	Left-handed	Right arm medium	International cap
All Rounders
6	Luke Wright	(England)	7 March 1985 (age 40)	Right-handed	Right arm fast medium	Visa contract & International Cap
5	James Faulkner	(Australia)	29 April 1990 (age 34)	Right-handed	Left arm fast medium	Vice-captain & International Cap
32	Glenn Maxwell	(Australia)	14 October 1988 (age 36)	Right-handed	Right arm off spin	International Cap
11	John Hastings	(Australia)	4 November 1985 (age 39)	Right-handed	Right arm fast medium	Captain & International Cap
16	Marcus Stoinis	(Australia)	16 August 1989 (age 35)	Right-handed	Right arm medium	International Cap
4	Evan Gulbis	(Australia)	26 March 1986 (age 38)	Right-handed	Right arm fast medium	
Wicketkeepers
54	Peter Handscomb	(Australia)	26 April 1991 (age 33)	Right-handed	—	International Cap
7	Tom Triffitt	(Australia)	13 November 1990 (age 34)	Right-handed	–	
2	Sam Harper	(Australia)	10 December 1996 (age 28)	Right-handed	—	
Pace Bowlers
25	Scott Boland	(Australia)	11 April 1989 (age 35)	Right-handed	Right arm fast medium	International Cap
10	Jackson Coleman	(Australia)	18 December 1991 (age 33)	Right-handed	Left arm fast medium	
17	Daniel Worrall	(Australia)	10 July 1991 (age 33)	Right-handed	Right arm fast medium	International Cap
20	Ben Hilfenhaus	(Australia)	15 March 1983 (age 42)	Right-handed	Right arm fast medium	International Cap
Spin Bowlers
19	Michael Beer	(Australia)	9 June 1984 (age 40)	Right-handed	Left arm orthodox	International Cap
63	Adam Zampa	(Australia)	31 March 1992 (age 32)	Right-handed	Right arm leg break	International Cap
23	Liam Bowe	(Australia)	23 September 1997 (age 27)	Right-handed	Slow left-arm wrist-spin	

== Season statistics ==
=== Home attendance ===
Match	Opponent	Attendance
2	Melbourne Renegades	71,162
5	Adelaide Strikers	40,254
7	Brisbane Heat	40,225
8	Sydney Sixers	46,671
Total Attendance		198,312
Average Attendance		49,578
