= 2015–16 Melbourne Stars season =

Melbourne Stars
2015–16 season
- Coach: (New Zealand) Stephen Fleming
- Captain(s): (Australia) Michael Clarke (Australia) David Hussey
- Home ground: Melbourne Cricket Ground, Melbourne
- BBL: 2nd
- BBL Finals: Runners Up
- Leading Run Scorer: (England) Kevin Pietersen (323)
- Leading Wicket Taker: (Australia) Adam Zampa (12)
- Highest home attendance: 80,883 vs Renegades (2 January 2016)
- Lowest home attendance: 18,809 vs Thunder (20 December 2015)
- Average home attendance: 40,298

The 2015–16 Melbourne Stars season was the fifth in the club's history. Coached by Stephen Fleming and captained by David Hussey, they competed in the BBL's 2015–16 season.

== Season ==
=== Ladder ===
Pos	Team	Pld	W	L	NR	Pts	NRR	Qualification
1	Adelaide Strikers	8	7	1	0	14	0.544	Advanced to semi-finals
2	Melbourne Stars	8	5	3	0	10	0.366	Advanced to semi-finals
3	Perth Scorchers	8	5	3	0	10	0.181	Advanced to semi-finals
4	Sydney Thunder (C)	8	4	4	0	8	0.375	Advanced to semi-finals
5	Melbourne Renegades	8	3	5	0	6	−0.041	
6	Brisbane Heat	8	3	5	0	6	−0.204	
7	Hobart Hurricanes	8	3	5	0	6	−0.955	
8	Sydney Sixers	8	2	6	0	4	−0.330	

(C) Champions

=== Regular season ===
18 December 2015
19:10 (D/N)
Scorecard

(H) Adelaide Strikers; 5/187 (20 overs)	v	Melbourne Stars; 7/168 (20 overs)
Alex Ross 65 (31); Scott Boland 2/55 (4 overs)		Marcus Stoinis 50 (42); Kane Richardson 3/23 (4 overs)

Adelaide Strikers won by 19 runs
Adelaide Oval
Attendance: 27,611
Umpires: Gerard Abood and Michael Graham-Smith
Player of the match: Alex Ross (Strikers)

- Melbourne Stars won the toss and elected to field.

20 December 2015
19:25 (D/N)
Scorecard

Sydney Thunder; 6/178 (20 overs)	v	Melbourne Stars (H); 5/177 (20 overs)
Usman Khawaja 109* (70); Glenn Maxwell 2/28 (4 overs)		Kevin Pietersen 76 (42); Andre Russell 2/28 (4 overs)

Sydney Thunder won by 1 run
Melbourne Cricket Ground
Attendance: 18,809
Umpires: Shawn Craig and Paul Wilson
Player of the match: Usman Khawaja (Thunder)

- Melbourne Stars won the toss and elected to field.

27 December 2015
19:10 (D/N)
Scorecard

(H) Sydney Sixers; 6/139 (20 overs)	v	Melbourne Stars; 5/143 (18.4 overs)
Moisés Henriques 41* (34); Ben Hilfenhaus 2/25 (3 overs)		Peter Handscomb 52 (40); Doug Bollinger 2/31 (3.4 overs)

Melbourne Stars won by 5 wickets
Sydney Cricket Ground
Attendance: 29,104
Umpires: Geoff Joshua and Sam Nogajski
Player of the match: Glenn Maxwell (Stars)

- Sydney Sixers won the toss and elected to bat.
- The crowd of 29,104 is the highest crowd at the SCG for a non-derby BBL match.

2 January 2016
18:10 (D/N)
Scorecard

Melbourne Renegades; 7/161 (20 overs)	v	Melbourne Stars (H); 3/163 (19.1 overs)
Cameron White 54 (39); John Hastings 4/29 (4 overs)		Luke Wright 109* (63); Chris Tremain 1/22 (4 overs)

Melbourne Stars won by 7 wickets
Melbourne Cricket Ground
Attendance: 80,883
Umpires: Shawn Craig and Sam Nogajski
Player of the match: Luke Wright (Stars)

- Melbourne Stars won the toss and elected to field.
- The crowd of 80,883 is the highest ever recorded attendance for a domestic cricket match.

6 January 2016
19:40 (D/N)
Scorecard

Hobart Hurricanes; 124 (20 overs)	v	Melbourne Stars (H); 2/126 (15 overs)
George Bailey 55 (40); Adam Zampa 2/18 (4 overs)		Glenn Maxwell 56* (32); Sam Rainbird 1/25 (4 overs)

Melbourne Stars won by 8 wickets
Melbourne Cricket Ground
Attendance: 33,603
Umpires: Geoff Joshua and Sam Nogajski
Player of the match: Glenn Maxwell (Stars)

- Melbourne Stars won the toss and elected to field.

9 January 2016
19:10 (D/N)
Scorecard

(H) Melbourne Renegades; 6/155 (20 overs)	v	Melbourne Stars; 2/156 (18 overs)
Dwayne Bravo 59* (37); Marcus Stoinis 3/11 (2 overs)		Kevin Pietersen 67* (43); Cameron Stevenson 1/28 (3 overs)

Melbourne Stars won by 8 wickets
Etihad Stadium
Attendance: 43,176
Umpires: Geoff Joshua and Mick Martell
Player of the match: Marcus Stoinis (Stars)

- Melbourne Stars won the toss and elected to field.
- Aaron Ayre (Renegades) made his T20 debut.
- The crowd of 43,176 is the highest at Etihad Stadium for a cricket match.

14 January 2016
19:40 (D/N)
Scorecard

Brisbane Heat; 7/188 (20 overs)	v	Melbourne Stars (H); 9/132 (20 overs)
Chris Lynn 56 (24); Adam Zampa 2/31 (4 overs)		Evan Gulbis 61* (52); Samuel Badree 5/22 (4 overs)

Brisbane Heat won by 56 runs
Melbourne Cricket Ground
Attendance: 30,649
Umpires: Greg Davidson and Sam Nogajski
Player of the match: Samuel Badree (Heat)

- Melbourne Stars won the toss and elected to field.

16 January 2016
18:15 (D/N)
Scorecard

Melbourne Stars; 9/146 (20 overs)	v	Perth Scorchers (H); 94 (19 overs)
David Hussey 36 (25); Matt Dixon 3/32 (4 overs)		Adam Voges 46* (51); Daniel Worrall 3/15 (4 overs)

Melbourne Stars won by 52 runs
#TheFurnace
Attendance: 20,870
Umpires: Phillip Gillespie and Geoff Joshua
Player of the match: Ben Hilfenhaus (Stars)

- Perth Scorchers won the toss and elected to field.
- Jhye Richardson (Scorchers) made his T20 debut.
- The crowd of 20,870 is the highest crowd for a BBL at this ground.

=== Semi-finals ===
22 January 2016
19:40 (D/N)
Scorecard

Perth Scorchers; 7/139 (20.0 overs)	v	Melbourne Stars (H); 3/140 (18.1 overs)
Adam Voges 52 (40); Daniel Worrall 3/25 (4 overs)		Kevin Pietersen 62 (36); Brad Hogg 1/20 (4 overs)

Melbourne Stars won by 7 wickets
Melbourne Cricket Ground
Attendance: 30,174

- Melbourne Stars won the toss and elected to field.

=== Final ===
24 January 2016
19:20 (D/N)
Scorecard

(H) Melbourne Stars; 9/176 (20 overs)	v	Sydney Thunder; 7/181 (19.3 overs)
Kevin Pietersen 74 (39); Marcus Stoinis 3/30 (4 overs)		Usman Khawaja 70 (40); Shane Watson 2/17 (3 overs)

Sydney Thunder won by 3 wickets
Melbourne Cricket Ground
Attendance: 47,672
Umpires: Simon Fry and Sam Nogajski
Player of the match: Usman Khawaja (Sydney Thunder)

- Sydney Thunders won the toss and elected to field.

== Players ==
S/N	Name	Nat.	Date of birth (age)	Batting style	Bowling style	Notes
Batsmen
24	Kevin Pietersen	(England)	27 June 1980 (age 45)	Right-handed	Right arm off spin	Visa contract
8	David Hussey	(Australia)	15 July 1977 (age 48)	Right-handed	Right arm off spin	Captain
21	Robert Quiney	(Australia)	20 August 1982 (age 43)	Left-handed	Right arm medium	
23	Michael Clarke	(Australia)	2 April 1981 (age 44)	Right-handed	Slow left arm orthodox	Captain, Withdrew
All-rounders
6	Luke Wright	(England)	7 March 1985 (age 40)	Right-handed	Right arm fast medium	Visa contract
5	James Faulkner	(Australia)	29 April 1990 (age 35)	Right-handed	Left arm fast medium	Vice-captain
32	Glenn Maxwell	(Australia)	14 October 1988 (age 37)	Right-handed	Right arm off spin	
11	John Hastings	(Australia)	4 November 1985 (age 40)	Right-handed	Right arm fast medium	
16	Marcus Stoinis	(Australia)	16 August 1989 (age 36)	Right-handed	Right arm medium	
4	Evan Gulbis	(Australia)	26 March 1986 (age 39)	Right-handed	Right arm fast medium	
Wicketkeepers
54	Peter Handscomb	(Australia)	26 April 1991 (age 34)	Right-handed	–	
7	Tom Triffitt	(Australia)	13 November 1990 (age 35)	Right-handed	–	
2	Sam Harper	(Australia)	10 December 1996 (age 29)	Right-handed	–	
Pace bowlers
17	Daniel Worrall	(Australia)	10 July 1991 (age 34)	Right-handed	Right arm fast medium	
25	Scott Boland	(Australia)	11 April 1989 (age 36)	Right-handed	Right arm fast medium	
20	Ben Hilfenhaus	(Australia)	15 March 1983 (age 42)	Right-handed	Right arm fast medium	
Spin bowlers
19	Michael Beer	(Australia)	9 June 1984 (age 41)	Right-handed	Left arm orthodox	
63	Adam Zampa	(Australia)	31 March 1992 (age 33)	Right-handed	Right-arm leg break	

== Season Statistics ==
=== Home attendance ===
Game	Opponent	Attendance
2	Sydney Thunder	18,809
4	Melbourne Renegades	80,883
5	Hobart Hurricanes	33,603
7	Brisbane Heat	30,649
SF2	Perth Scorchers	30,174
Final	Sydney Thunder	47,672
Total Attendance		241,790
Average Attendance		40,298
