= Unnamed Melbourne BBL franchise =

Melbourne-based franchise cricket team

- Nickname: TBD
- League: Big Bash League
- Association: Cricket Australia

Team information
- City: Melbourne, Victoria
- Home ground: Melbourne Cricket Ground
- Capacity: 100,024

The unnamed Melbourne BBL franchise was a proposed Australian men's professional Twenty20 (T20) franchise cricket team that would compete in Australia's domestic Twenty20 competition, the Big Bash League (BBL). It would be a merger of the brands of the Melbourne Renegades and the Melbourne Stars, utilising the Stars' existing BBL license. Nick Cummins, the CEO of Cricket Victoria (CV), has described the new team as "just a merger of brands and staff" and "not a merger of the teams".

The team would be known as Melbourne (with a nickname to be determined), play home matches at the Melbourne Cricket Ground (MCG) – the home ground of the Stars – and "almost certainly" wear navy blue colours.

The new team was announced on 2 June 2026, but two weeks later, it was confirmed that both the Renegades and the Stars would compete in the upcoming 2026–27 Big Bash League season under their existing names.

== History ==
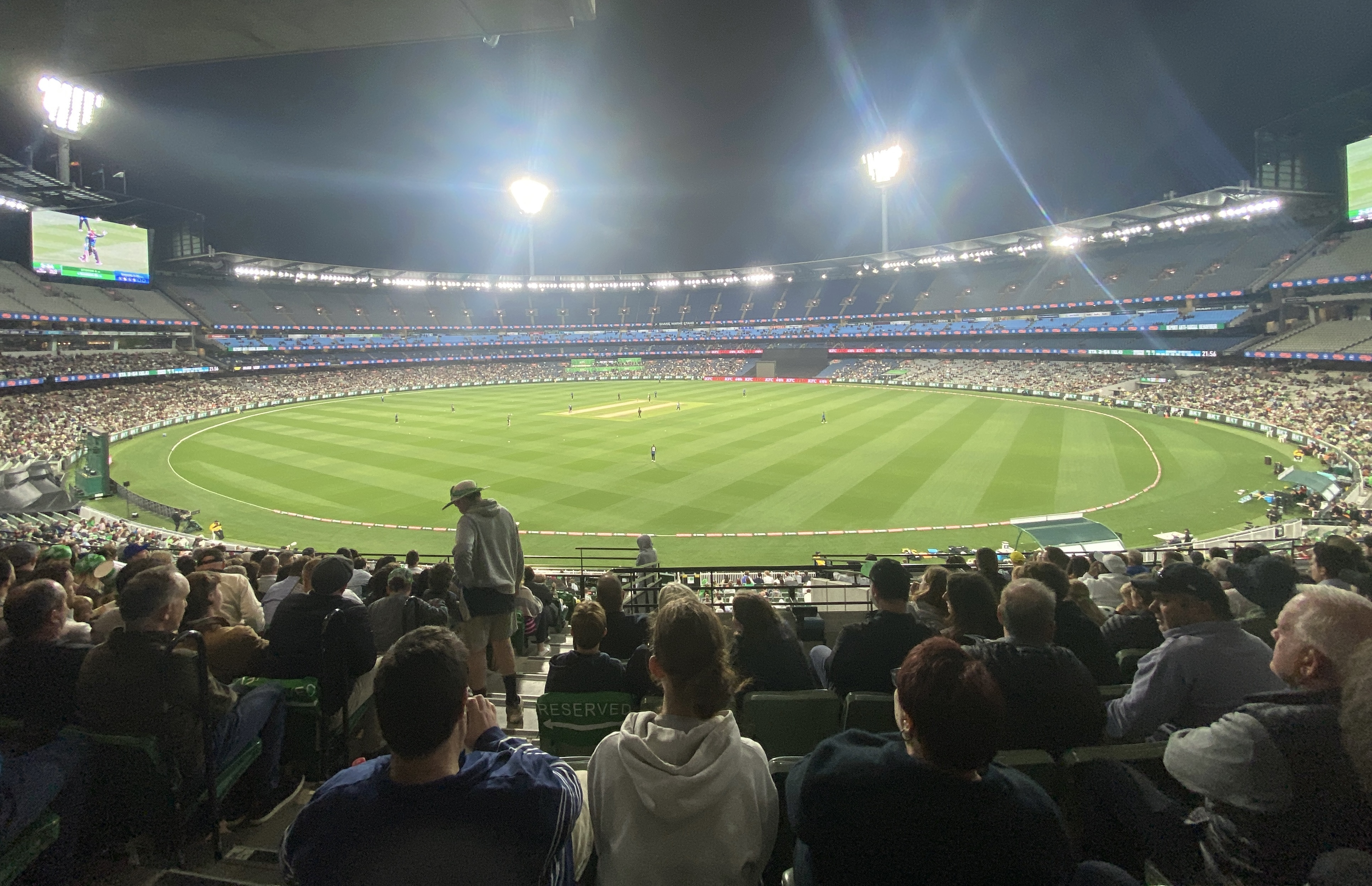
Scenes during the Stars' match against the Adelaide Strikers on 13 January 2026

=== Background ===
The Renegades and the Stars were both formed in 2011 for the inaugural Big Bash League season. The Renegades won its first and only BBL title in 2018–19, when they defeated the Stars by 13 runs. The Stars have never won a BBL title, despite making the final on three occasions.

As the two Melbourne-based teams, the Renegades and the Stars had a rivalry and played each other in the Melbourne Derby twice during each regular season. During the first leg of the two derbies at the MCG in the 2015–16 season, the derby drew a record crowd of 80,883, which is the highest crowd for any domestic cricket match in the history of the sport.

In the two Melbourne Derby matches during the 2025–26 season, the Renegades won the first leg by four runs in front of 68,124 people at the MCG, while the Stars won by eight wickets in the second leg at Docklands Stadium.

=== Merger ===
Discussions around merging the Renegades and the Stars began at Cricket Victoria (CV) in late December 2025. The decision to merge the teams was kept secret until it was first reported on 2 June 2026 by sports journalist Tom Morris. Players were not notified of the merger before it was publicly reported, with only "select senior administrators" aware in advance.
