= Nick Cummins (sports administrator) =

Australian cricket administrator

Nicholas William Redfern Cummins (born 1973) is an Australian cricket administrator and is the current CEO of Cricket Victoria.

== Career ==
Cummins began working in sports management in 1997 where he worked with Elite Sports Properties (ESP). As manager of the Communications Division, Cummins was involved in a number of major sporting events, including the 1998 Commonwealth Games, 2000 Summer Olympics, 2002 Winter Olympics, 2002 Commonwealth Games and 2003 Rugby World Cup.

In 2004 Cummins moved into the corporate sector, holding sponsorship/marketing roles at Foster's Group, Ford Australia and Betfair before moving to Cricket Australia in 2013.

In late 2013, Cummins was appointed General Manager of the Sydney Thunder, a team in the Big Bash League.

Over four seasons, Cummins oversaw the club's evolution from perennial cellar dwellers to dual BBL and WBBL Champions in BBL05/WBBL01. In 2016, Cummins was recognised for his achievements, winning the NSW Sports Awards Administrator of the Year.

At the start of 2017, Cummins was appointed CEO of Cricket Tasmania. During his tenure, the Tasmanian Tigers and Hobart Hurricanes reached the Sheffield Shield, JLT Cup and BBL Finals (twice).

In December 2019, Cummins took up a new role as General Manager, Big Bash, Commercial and Marketing at Cricket Victoria, looking after commercial responsibilities as they relate to the two Big Bash League teams Melbourne Renegades and Melbourne Stars. During his time in charge, the Melbourne Stars reached the BBL Grand Final (BBL09) and their first ever WBBL finals campaign (WBBL07), losing both finals.

In August 2021, Cummins was promoted to CEO of Cricket Victoria after three months as Interim CEO.
