= 2020–21 Melbourne Stars season =

Overview of Melbourne Stars in 2020–21

Melbourne Stars
2020-21 season
- Coach: David Hussey
- Captain(s): Glenn Maxwell
- Home ground: Melbourne Cricket Ground, Melbourne
- BBL Season: 7th
- Leading Run Scorer: Marcus Stoinis (396)
- Leading Wicket Taker: Adam Zampa (19)

The 2020–21 Melbourne Stars season was the tenth in the club's history. The team was coached by David Hussey and under the captaincy of Glenn Maxwell, they competed in the BBL's 2020–21 season.

== Season results and standings ==
=== Ladder ===
Pos	Team	Pld	W	L	NR	BP	Pts	NRR	Qualification
1	Sydney Sixers (C)	14	9	5	0	9	36	0.257	Advanced to play-off phase
2	Perth Scorchers	14	8	5	1	6	32	0.851	Advanced to play-off phase
3	Sydney Thunder	14	8	6	0	7	31	0.949	Advanced to play-off phase
4	Brisbane Heat	14	7	7	0	8	29	−0.286	Advanced to play-off phase
5	Adelaide Strikers	14	7	7	0	7	28	0.105	Advanced to play-off phase
6	Hobart Hurricanes	14	7	7	0	7	28	−0.187	
7	Melbourne Stars	14	5	8	1	7	24	0.140	
8	Melbourne Renegades	14	4	10	0	4	16	−1.727	

Source: ESPNcricinfo
(C) Champions

=== Regular season ===
Match 2
11 December 2020
19:15 (D/N)
Scorecard

Brisbane Heat; 125 (19.5 overs)	v	Melbourne Stars (H); 4/129 (17.1 overs)
Tom Cooper 26 (24); Nathan Coulter-Nile 4/10 (3.5 overs)		Glenn Maxwell 46 (26); Jack Wood 2/28 (3 overs)

Melbourne Stars won by 6 wickets
Manuka Oval, Canberra
Attendance: 2,471
Umpires: Phillip Gillespie and Shawn Craig
Player of the match: Nathan Coulter-Nile (Melbourne Stars)

- Melbourne Stars won the toss and elected to field.
- Jack Wood and Xavier Bartlett (Brisbane Heat) made their T20 debuts.

Match 3
12 December 2020
16:05 (D/N)
Scorecard

(H) Melbourne Stars; 8/169 (20 overs)	v	Sydney Thunder; 9/147 (20 overs)
Marcus Stoinis 61 (37); Daniel Sams 2/24 (3 overs)		Callum Ferguson 54 (35); Liam Hatcher 3/28 (4 overs)

Melbourne Stars won by 22 runs
Manuka Oval, Canberra
Attendance: 3,295
Umpires: Greg Davidson and Phillip Gillespie
Player of the match: Adam Zampa (Melbourne Stars0

- Melbourne Stars won the toss and elected to bat.
- Liam Hatcher (Stars) and Tanveer Sangha (Thunder) made their T20 debuts.

Match 9
16 December 2020
19:15 (D/N)
Scorecard

Perth Scorchers; 6/158 (17 overs)	v	Melbourne Stars; 1/10 (1.1 overs)
Colin Munro 49 (36); Nic Maddinson 2/8 (2 overs)		Andre Fletcher 6* (4); Jhye Richardson 1/0 (0.1 overs)

No result
University of Tasmania Stadium, Launceston
Attendance: TBA
Umpires: Michael Graham-Smith and Sam Nogajski

- Melbourne Stars won the toss and elected to field.
- Rain stopped play during Perth Scorchers' innings. Melbourne Stars were set a revised target of 76 runs from 6 overs.
- X-factor subs: Ben Dunk (Melbourne Stars) replaced Tom O'Connell.

Match 15
26 December 2020
20:20 (D/N)
Scorecard

Sydney Sixers; 9/194 (19.5 overs)	v	Melbourne Stars; 5/193 (20 overs)
Daniel Hughes 96 (51); Liam Hatcher 3/33 (4 overs)		Glenn Maxwell 71* (47); Steve O'Keefe 2/13 (2 overs)

Sydney Sixers won by 1 wicket
Metricon Stadium, Gold Coast
Attendance: TBA
Umpires: Greg Davidson and Phillip Gillespie
Player of the match: Daniel Hughes (Sydney Sixers)

- Sydney Sixers won the toss and elected to field.

Match 19
29 December 2020
19:15 (D/N)
Scorecard

Sydney Thunder; 7/219 (20 overs)	v	Melbourne Stars; 144 (19.5 overs)
Alex Hales 71 (29); Adam Zampa 3/49 (4 overs)		Marcus Stoinis 27 (15); Chris Green 4/34 (4 overs)

Sydney Thunder won by 75 runs
Manuka Oval, Canberra
Attendance: TBA
Umpires: Donovan Marius Koch and Simon Lightbody
Player of the match: Alex Hales (Sydney Thunder)

- Melbourne Stars won the toss and elected to field.
- X-factor subs: Ben Dunk (Melbourne Stars) replaced Lance Morris.

Match 23
2 January 2021
17:05 (D/N)
Scorecard

Hobart Hurricanes; 5/164 (20 overs)	v	Melbourne Stars; 9/143 (20 overs)
Dawid Malan 75 (56); Billy Stanlake 3/25 (4 overs)		Glenn Maxwell 70 (37); Scott Boland 3/22 (4 overs)

Hobart Hurricanes won by 21 runs
Blundstone Arena, Hobart
Umpires: Gerard Abood and Shawn Craig
Player of the match: Scott Boland (Hobart Hurricanes)

- Melbourne Stars won the toss and elected to field.
- X-factor subs: Lance Morris (Melbourne Stars) replaced Nic Maddinson.

Match 27
4 January 2021
16:05 (D/N)
Scorecard

Melbourne Stars; 6/183 (20 overs)	v	Hobart Hurricanes; 6/173 (20 overs)
Marcus Stoinis 97* (55); Nathan Ellis 3/31 (4 overs)		Ben McDermott 91 (58); Sam Rainbird 2/22 (4 overs)

Melbourne Stars won by 10 runs
Blundstone Arena, Hobart
Umpires: Gerard Abood and Nathan Johnstone
Player of the match: Marcus Stoinis (Melbourne Stars)

- Hobart Hurricanes won the toss and elected to field.

Match 32
7 January 2021
21:20 (D/N)
Scorecard

Brisbane Heat; 3/115 (10 overs)	v	Melbourne Stars; 5/110 (10 overs)
Chris Lynn 48 (23); Adam Zampa 2/7 (2 overs)		Nick Larkin 35* (16); Mark Steketee 3/25 (2 overs)

Brisbane Heat won by 18 runs (DLS method)
Metricon Stadium, Gold Coast
Umpires: Gerard Abood and Phillip Gillespie
Player of the match: Chris Lynn (Brisbane Heat)

- Melbourne Stars won the toss and elected to field.
- The match was reduced to 10 overs per side due to rain. Melbourne Stars were set a revised target of 129 runs.

Match 36
11 January 2021
18:45 (D/N)
Scorecard

Adelaide Strikers; 5/150 (19 overs)	v	Melbourne Stars; 7/149 (20 overs)
Jonathan Wells 36 (27); Adam Zampa 2/20 (4 overs)		Nic Maddinson 48 (34); Wes Agar 2/19 (4 overs)

Adelaide Strikers won by 5 wickets
Adelaide Oval, Adelaide
Umpires: Sam Nogajski and David Taylor
Player of the match: Wes Agar (Adelaide Strikers)

- Melbourne Stars won the toss and elected to bat.

Match 40
15 January 2021
19:15 (D/N)
Scorecard

Melbourne Stars; 2/179 (20 overs)	v	Adelaide Strikers; 68 (14.2 overs)
Andre Fletcher 89* (49); Cameron Valente 1/36 (4 overs)		Matt Renshaw 20 (23); Adam Zampa 5/17 (3.2 overs)

Melbourne Stars won by 111 runs
Melbourne Cricket Ground, Melbourne
Umpires: Shawn Craig and Sam Nogajski
Player of the match: Andre Fletcher (Melbourne Stars)

- Adelaide Strikers won the toss and elected to field.

Match 42
17 January 2021
19:15 (D/N)
Scorecard

Melbourne Renegades; 150 (19.5 overs)	v	Melbourne Stars; 4/153 (19.1 overs)
Sam Harper 63 (52); Liam Hatcher 4/29 (4 overs)		Marcus Stoinis 43 (32); Kane Richardson 2/24 (4 overs)

Melbourne Stars won by 6 wickets
Melbourne Cricket Ground, Melbourne
Umpires: Donovan Marius Koch and Shawn Craig
Player of the match: Liam Hatcher (Melbourne Stars)

- Melbourne Renegades won the toss and elected to bat.

Match 45
20 January 2021
19:15 (D/N)
Scorecard

Melbourne Renegades; 5/160 (19.4 overs)	v	Melbourne Stars; 6/158 (20 overs)
Mackenzie Harvey 47* (21); Nathan Coulter-Nile 3/41 (4 overs)		Nick Larkin 61* (47); Zak Evans 2/23 (3 overs)

Melbourne Renegades won by 5 wickets
Marvel Stadium, Melbourne
Umpires: Sam Nogajski and Shawn Craig
Player of the match: Mackenzie Harvey (Melbourne Renegades)

- Melbourne Stars won the toss and elected to bat.

Match 50
23 January 2021
19:15 (D/N)
Scorecard

Melbourne Stars; 6/171 (20 overs)	v	Perth Scorchers; 4/182 (20 overs)
Nick Larkin 70 (44); Andrew Tye 2/28 (4 overs)		Jason Roy 54 (32); Marcus Stoinis 1/16 (2 overs)

Perth Scorchers won by 11 runs
Melbourne Cricket Ground, Melbourne
Umpires: Michael Graham-Smith and Phillip Gillespie
Player of the match: Jason Roy (Perth Scorchers)

- Melbourne Stars won the toss and elected to field.

Match 56
26 January 2021
19:15 (D/N)
Scorecard

Melbourne Stars; 6/177 (20 overs)	v	Sydney Sixers; 5/180 (19.5 overs)
Glenn Maxwell 66 (41); Ben Dwarshuis 3/27 (4 overs)		Daniel Christian 49* (23); Nic Maddinson 1/6 (1 overs)

Sydney Sixers won by 5 wickets
Melbourne Cricket Ground, Melbourne
Umpires: Phillip Gillespie and Shawn Craig
Player of the match: Ben Dwarshuis (Sydney Sixers)

- Sydney Sixers won the toss and elected to field.

== Players ==
=== Squad ===
The following is the Stars men's squad for the 2020–21 Big Bash League season as of 2 January 2020.

S/N	Name	Nat.	Date of birth	Batting style	Bowling style	Notes
Batsmen
10	Will Pucovski	(Australia)	2 February 1998 (age 27)	Right-handed	Right-arm off break	
36	Nick Larkin	(Australia) (Republic of Ireland)	1 May 1990 (age 34)	Right-handed	—	
53	Nic Maddinson	(Australia)	21 December 1991 (age 33)	Left-handed	Left-arm orthodox	International Cap
All-rounders
16	Marcus Stoinis	(Australia)	16 August 1989 (age 35)	Right-handed	Right-arm medium	International Cap
23	Clint Hinchliffe	(Australia)	23 October 1996 (age 28)	Left-handed	Slow left-arm unorthodox	
32	Glenn Maxwell	(Australia)	14 October 1988 (age 36)	Right-handed	Right-arm off-spin	Captain, International Cap
35	Hilton Cartwright	(Australia)	14 February 1992 (age 33)	Right-handed	Right-arm medium	International Cap
Wicketkeepers
13	Seb Gotch	(Australia)	12 July 1993 (age 31)	Right-handed	Right-arm off-break	
21	Jonny Bairstow	(England)	26 September 1989 (age 35)	Right-handed	—	Visa Contract and International Cap
29	Nicholas Pooran	(Trinidad and Tobago)	2 October 1995 (age 29)	Left-handed	—	Visa Contract and International Cap
51	Ben Dunk	(Australia)	11 March 1987 (age 38)	Left-handed	Right arm off-break	International Cap
72	Andre Fletcher	(Grenada)	28 November 1987 (age 37)	Right-handed	—	Visa Contract and International Cap
Pace bowlers
7	Nathan Coulter-Nile	(Australia)	11 October 1987 (age 37)	Right-handed	Right-arm fast	International Cap
9	Jackson Coleman	(Australia)	18 December 1991 (age 33)	Right-handed	Right-arm fast-medium	U-19 International Cap
19	Liam Hatcher	(Australia)	17 September 1996 (age 28)	Right-handed	Right-arm fast	
28	Lance Morris	(Australia)	28 March 1998 (age 26)	Right-handed	Right-arm fast-medium	
37	Billy Stanlake	(Australia)	4 November 1994 (age 30)	Left-handed	Right-arm fast	International Cap
43	Sam Rainbird	(Australia)	5 June 1992 (age 32)	Right-handed	Left-arm medium-fast	International Cap
77	Haris Rauf	(Pakistan)	7 November 1993 (age 31)	Right-handed	Right-arm fast	Visa Contract and International Cap
90	Dilbar Hussain	(Pakistan)	20 February 1993 (age 32)	Right-handed	Right-arm fast	Visa Contract
Spin bowlers
6	Tom O'Connell	(Australia)	14 June 2000 (age 24)	Left-handed	Right-arm leg spin	
75	Zahir Khan	(Afghanistan)	20 December 1998 (age 26)	Left-handed	Left-arm orthodox	Visa Contract and International Cap
88	Adam Zampa	(Australia)	31 March 1992 (age 32)	Right-handed	Right-arm leg-break	International Cap

- Player ruled out of season due to injury.

=== Personnel Changes ===
==== Incoming Players ====
Entry date	Role	No.	Player	From team	Notes	Ref.
8 September 2020	Pace Bowler	37	(Australia) Billy Stanlake	(Australia) Adelaide Strikers	International Cap, Traded for Daniel Worrall	
28 October 2020	Batsman	10	(Australia) Will Pucovski	(Australia) Free Agent		
9 November 2020	Wicket-keeper	21	(England) Jonny Bairstow	(England) International Player	Visa Contract and International Cap	
12 November 2020	Wicket-keeper	-	(Trinidad and Tobago) Nicholas Pooran	(Trinidad and Tobago) International Player	Visa Contract and International Cap	
18 November 2020	Spin Bowler	75	(Afghanistan) Zahir Khan	(Australia) Brisbane Heat	Visa Contract and International Cap	
24 November 2020	Pace Bowler	19	(Australia) Liam Hatcher	(Australia) Sydney Thunder		
3 December 2020	Wicket-keeper	72	(Grenada) Andre Fletcher	(Grenada) International Player	Visa Contract and International Cap	
2 January 2021	Pace Bowler	43	(Australia) Sam Rainbird	(Australia) Free Agent		

==== Outgoing Players ====
Exit date	Role	No.	Player	To team	Notes	Ref.
1 March 2020	Pace Bowler	8	(South Africa) Dale Steyn	Released	Visa Contract and International Cap	
1 March 2020	All-rounder	12	(Australia) Jonathan Merlo	Released		
1 March 2020	Pace Bowler	40	(England) Pat Brown	Released	Visa Contract and International Cap	
8 September 2020	Pace Bowler	17	(Australia) Daniel Worrall	(Australia) Adelaide Strikers	Traded for Billy Stanlake	
9 September 2020	Wicket-keeper	54	(Australia) Peter Handscomb	(Australia) Hobart Hurricanes	International Cap	
19 November 2020	Spin Bowler	25	(Nepal) Sandeep Lamichhane	(Australia) Hobart Hurricanes	Visa Contract and International Cap	
3 December 2020	Wicket-keeper	21	(England) Jonny Bairstow	Withdrew	Visa Contract and International Cap	

== Statistics ==
=== Attendance ===
==== Home attendance ====
Match	Opponent	Attendance
1	Brisbane Heat	2,471
2	Sydney Thunder	3,295
6	Hobart Hurricanes	
10	Adelaide Strikers	
11	Melbourne Renegades	
13	Perth Scorchers	
14	Sydney Sixers	
Total Attendance		
Average Attendance		

Due to the COVID-19 pandemic, all matches were played with a reduced capacity.

=== Most runs ===
No.	Name	Match	Inns	NO	Runs	HS	Ave.	BF	SR	100s	50s	0	4s	6s
1	Marcus Stoinis	13	13	1	396	97*	33.00	278	142.44	0	2	1	40	17
2	Glenn Maxwell	14	13	1	379	71*	31.58	264	143.56	0	3	3	32	17
3	Nick Larkin	11	10	3	276	70	39.42	218	126.60	0	2	0	32	5
4	Hilton Cartwright	14	13	5	239	46*	29.87	166	143.97	0	0	0	11	15
5	Andre Fletcher	12	12	2	206	89*	20.60	158	130.37	0	1	0	27	9

- Last updated: 30 January 2021
- Source:Cricinfo

=== Most wickets ===
No.	Name	Match	Inns	Overs	Maidens	Runs	Wickets	BBI	Ave.	Econ.	SR	4W	5W
1	Adam Zampa	12	12	45.1	0	332	19	5/17	17.47	7.35	14.2	0	1
2	Liam Hatcher	9	9	34.4	0	308	13	3/28	23.69	8.88	16.0	0	0
3	Billy Stanlake	12	12	38.5	0	324	13	3/25	24.92	8.34	17.9	0	0
4	Nathan Coulter-Nile	6	6	21.5	0	172	11	4/10	15.63	7.87	11.9	1	0
5	Glenn Maxwell	14	12	28.5	0	221	7	2/12	31.57	7.66	24.7	0	0

- Last updated: 30 January 2021
- Source:Cricinfo

== See also ==
- Melbourne Stars
