= Liam Bowe =

Australian cricketer (born 1997)

Personal information
- Full name: Liam Patrick Bowe
- Born: 23 September 1997 (age 29); Bendigo, Victoria, Australia
- Batting: Left-handed
- Bowling: Left-arm unorthodox spin
- Role: Bowler

Domestic team information
- Years: Team
- 2016/17–2018/19: Melbourne Stars
- 2019/20: Sydney Thunder

Career statistics
Competition	Twenty20
Matches	13
Runs scored	2
Batting average	1.00
100s/50s	0/0
Top score	2*
Balls bowled	234
Wickets	11
Bowling average	30.72
5 wickets in innings	0
10 wickets in match	0
Best bowling	2/23
Catches/stumpings	1/–
- Source: Cricinfo, 4 May 2025

Liam Patrick Bowe (born 23 September 1997) is an Australian cricketer. He made his Twenty20 (T20) debut for Melbourne Stars in the 2016–17 Big Bash League season on 10 January 2017.

Bowe opts to play in glasses rather than contact lenses in the field. Due to this and a good debut match, he was affectionately nicknamed "cricket's Harry Potter" by fans, later adopting the nickname "The Wizard". This nickname, as well as the use of his glasses, saw him established as a cult hero immediately after his debut.
