= Alex Keath =

Australian rules footballer

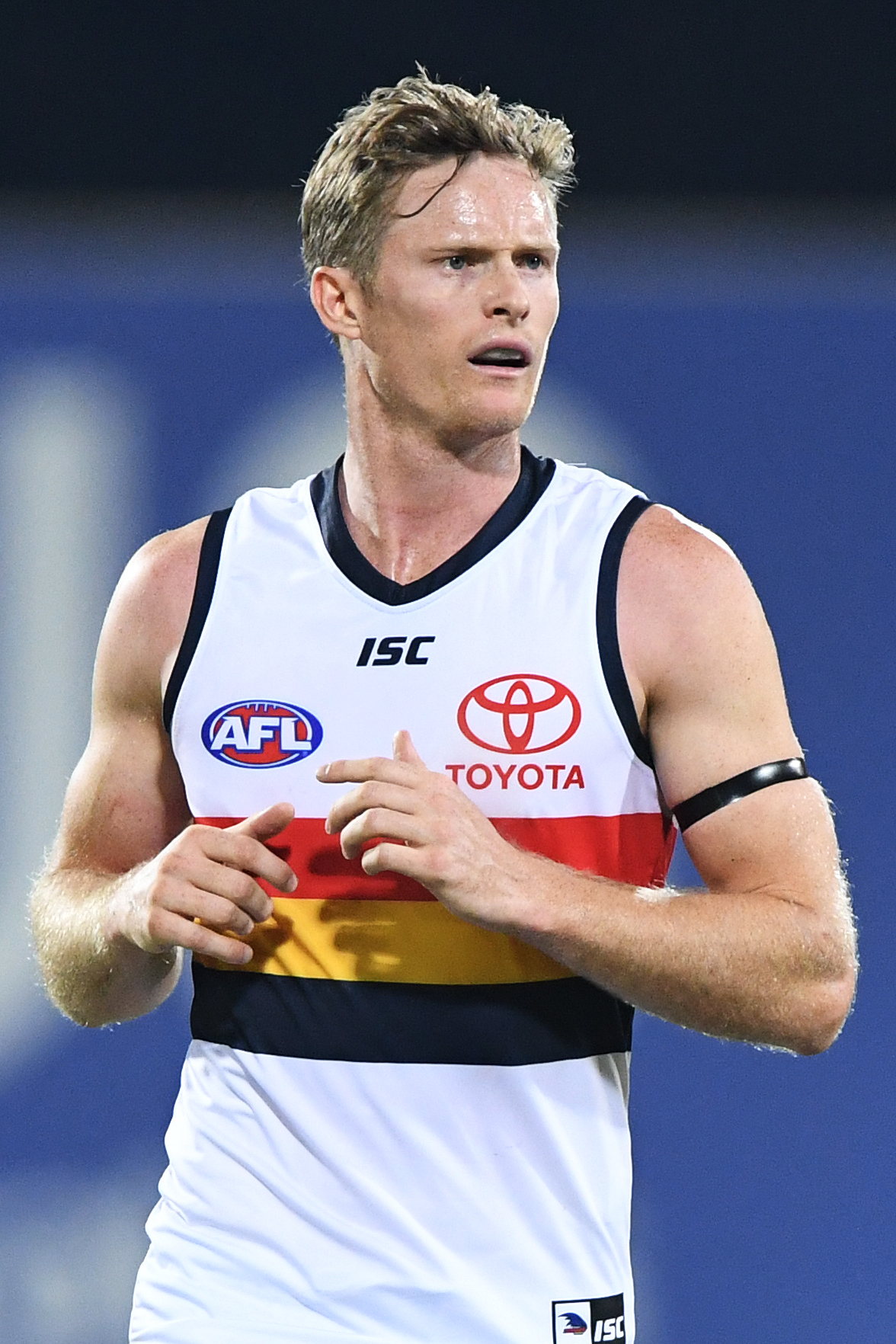
- Keath in June 2019

Personal information
- Full name: Alexander Robin Keath
- Born: 20 January 1992 (age 34); Shepparton, Victoria
- Original teams: Shepparton Bears; Melbourne Grammar; Murray U18
- Draft: No. 58, 2016 rookie draft
- Height: 200 cm (6 ft 7 in)
- Weight: 97 kg (214 lb)
- Position: Defender

Playing career
Years	Club	Games (Goals)
2016–2019	Adelaide	30 (1)
2020–2024	Western Bulldogs	79 (4)
Total		109 (5)

Career highlights
- Showdown Medal (round 8, 2019); Brad Johnson Best Team Player Award: 2021

Alex Keath
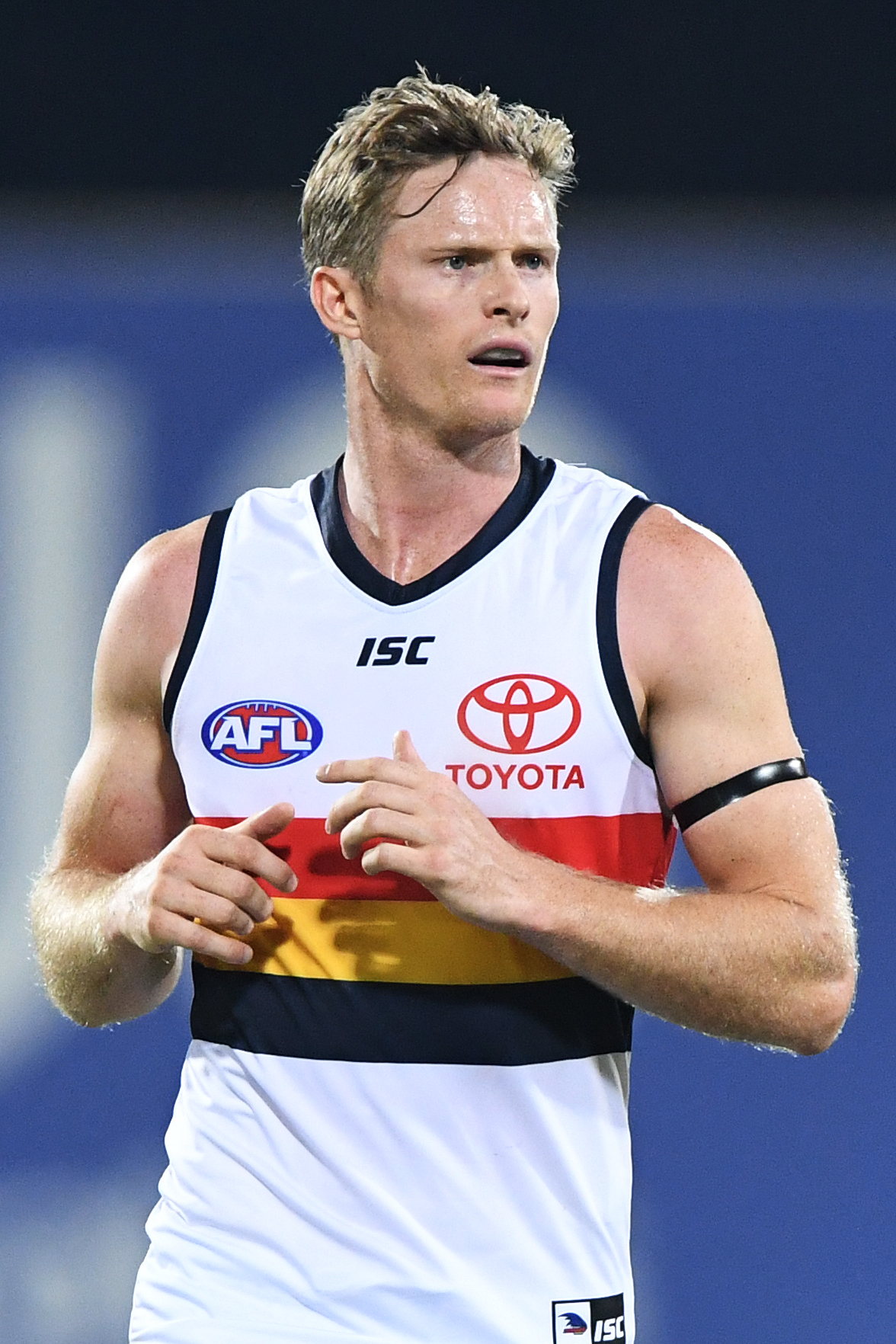

Cricket information
- Batting: Right-handed
- Bowling: Right-arm medium
- Role: Allrounder

Domestic team information
- Years: Team
- 2010/11–2014/15: Victoria
- 2012/13–2014/15: Melbourne Stars

Career statistics
Competition	FC	LA	T20
Matches	7	16	5
Runs scored	174	250	40
Batting average	17.40	19.23	13.33
100s/50s	0/0	0/1	0/0
Top score	46	55	30
Balls bowled	126	138	6
Wickets	4	3	0
Bowling average	18.25	32.66	–
5 wickets in innings	0	0	–
10 wickets in match	0	0	–
Best bowling	2/2	2/15	–
Catches/stumpings	5/–	15/–	2/–
- Source: Cricinfo, 19 October 2015

Alexander Robin Keath (born 20 January 1992) is a former Australian rules footballer who played for the Western Bulldogs in the Australian Football League between 2020 and 2024 and the Adelaide Crows between 2016 and 2019. He formerly played professional cricket for Victoria in Australian domestic cricket and the Melbourne Stars in the Big Bash League.

== Early life ==
Born in Shepparton in northern Victoria, Keath completed his schooling at Goulburn Valley Grammar School and Melbourne Grammar School. He was a talented junior in both football and cricket, and drew the attention of professional recruiters from both sports. In 2009, after excelling at under-18s football for the Murray Bushrangers in the TAC Cup, he was recruited by the newly established Gold Coast Suns football club, which at that time was recruiting twelve 17-year-olds in a separate draft before it entered the Australian Football League in 2011. At the same time, Keath had excelled as a junior cricketer, and represented Australia in their successful 2010 Under-19 Cricket World Cup, and was offered a three-year Cricket Victoria contract.

== Cricket career ==
In April 2010, Keath chose to proceed with cricket, accepting his Cricket Victoria contract. An all rounder who bowled medium pace, Keath made his first-class cricket debut against the touring England team in December 2010 making 46. Over the following five years, he failed to earn a regular spot in the Victorian team, playing a total of seven first-class matches and sixteen List A matches, averaging less than twenty with the bat in both formats, as well as five Twenty20 matches for the Melbourne Stars. He played premier cricket for Melbourne during that time, scoring 2101 runs at 35.01 and taking 79 wickets at 19.62.

At the end of the 2014–15 season, Keath lost his Cricket Victoria contract. He spent the 2015 season playing in England in the Birmingham Premier League, and upon his return to Australia signed for South Australian Grade Cricket club Prospect. On 8 December 2015 Keath was signed by the Adelaide Strikers in the Big Bash League but was not offered a first class contract with the South Australian Cricket Association (SACA).

== Football career ==
Despite being drafted to the Gold Coast Suns in 2009, Keath was eligible to be drafted as a Category B rookie from 2013 as he had not played for an Australian rules football club at any level for three years. His shift to South Australian grade cricket attracted the attention of football recruiters, and in October 2015 he was signed by the Adelaide Football Club as a Category B rookie. Despite being on the football club's list, cricket initially remained Keath's primary focus season, with Adelaide's recruitment of him in the hope that he would switch to football at the end of the 2015–16 summer season. After he failed to earn a SACA contract, he began playing SANFL football for the Adelaide reserves in the 2016 winter season. In 2017, Keath was named co-captain of the Adelaide Crows SANFL team.

Keath made his debut for the Adelaide Crows AFL side against the Geelong Cats at Adelaide Oval on 21 July 2017, filling in for the injured Jake Lever and Kyle Hartigan.

At the end of the 2019 AFL season Keath officially requested a trade to the Western Bulldogs. The trade was finalised on 16 October. A key player in the Bulldogs' 2021 campaign, Keath played in the losing 2021 Grand Final. He was awarded as the Bulldogs' Best Team Player following the grand final defeat, named after former Western Bulldogs legend Brad Johnson. At the conclusion of the 2024 season, Keath retired from professional football, following 79 games across five years at the Bulldogs.

== Statistics ==
Legend
G	Goals	K	Kicks	D	Disposals	T	Tackles
B	Behinds	H	Handballs	M	Marks

Season	Team	No.	Games	Totals							Averages (per game)							Votes
Season	Team	No.	Games	G	B	K	H	D	M	T	G	B	K	H	D	M	T	Votes
2017	Adelaide	42	6	0	0	36	28	64	27	13	0.0	0.0	6.0	4.7	10.7	4.5	2.2	0
2018	Adelaide	42	6	0	0	56	31	87	27	9	0.0	0.0	9.3	5.2	14.5	4.5	1.5	0
2019	Adelaide	42	18	1	0	188	106	294	112	30	0.1	0.0	10.4	5.9	16.3	6.2	1.7	6
2020 (Note: The 2020 season was played with 17 home-and-away matches per team (down from 22) and 16-minute quarters with time on (down from 20-minute quarters with time on) due to the impact of the COVID-19 pandemic.)	Western Bulldogs	42	18	1	1	113	66	179	70	15	0.1	0.1	6.3	3.7	9.9	3.9	0.8	0
2021	Western Bulldogs	42	23	0	1	161	117	278	110	43	0.0	0.0	7.0	5.1	12.1	4.8	1.9	0
2022	Western Bulldogs	42	15	3	0	105	68	173	80	20	0.2	0.0	7.0	4.5	11.5	5.3	1.3	0
2023	Western Bulldogs	42	18	0	0	128	89	217	92	29	0.0	0.0	7.1	4.9	12.1	5.1	1.6	0
2024	Western Bulldogs	42	5	0	0	28	27	55	22	5	0.0	0.0	5.6	5.4	11.0	4.4	1.0	0
2025	Western Bulldogs	42	0	—	—	—	—	—	—	—	—	—	—	—	—	—	—	0
Career			109	5	2	815	532	1347	540	164	0.0	0.0	7.5	4.9	12.4	5.0	1.5	6
