= Melbourne Stars =

Melbourne-based franchise cricket team

- Nickname: Stars
- League: Big Bash League
- Association: Cricket Australia

Personnel
- Captain: Marcus Stoinis
- Coach: Cameron White
- Owner: Cricket Victoria

Team information
- City: Melbourne, Victoria
- Colours: Green
- Founded: 2011; 15 years ago
- Home ground: Melbourne Cricket Ground
- Capacity: 100,024

History
- Big Bash League wins: 0
- Official website: melbournestars.com.au
Home kit
Away kit

The Melbourne Stars are an Australian men's professional Twenty20 (T20) franchise cricket team that competed in Australia's domestic Twenty20 competition, the Big Bash League (BBL). Based in Melbourne, Victoria, the Stars wore a green uniform and played their home matches at the Melbourne Cricket Ground (MCG). They are the only team not to have won a Big Bash League title despite making three appearances in the finals.

On 2 June 2026, it was reported that the brands of the Stars and the Melbourne Renegades would be merged into a new franchise, utilising the Stars' existing BBL license. Nick Cummins, the CEO of Cricket Victoria (CV), has described the new team as "just a merger of brands and staff" and "not a merger of the teams". Two weeks later, it was confirmed that both the Stars and the Renegades would compete in the upcoming 2026–27 season under their existing names.

== Mascots ==
Starman & Starlet are two of the official mascots of the Melbourne Stars. In BBL|05 the Stars introduced a secondary mascot, Steven Seagull, the year after a seagull was struck with a cricket ball hit by Perth Scorchers batsman Adam Voges during a match between Melbourne Stars and Perth Scorchers in BBL|04 while the Stars were fielding at the Melbourne Cricket Ground. Rob Quiney, who was the first to the scene, immediately signalled that he feared the worst for the stricken bird as it lay motionless on the ground, before he delicately carried it over the boundary rope and placed it back on the turf. But just minutes later, the bird came back to life and started the walk along the boundary line, much to the delight of the huge MCG crowd.

== Rivalries ==
When the league began in 2011, Cricket Australia decided they would place two teams in Melbourne. With the core group of players for both teams coming from the Victoria cricket team, this rivalry automatically became widely anticipated in Melbourne. The derby between the new two teams, the Stars and the Melbourne Renegades, quickly became hugely popular with big crowds flocking in to the derby matches at both the MCG and Docklands Stadium. In BBL05, during the first leg of the two derbies at the MCG, it drew a record crowd of 80,883 which is the highest crowd for any domestic cricket match ever in the history of the sport.

List of Melbourne Derby matches
Date	Winner	Margin	Venue	Attendance	Player of the match
7 January 2012	Stars	11 runs (D/L)	MCG	40,227	David Hussey
7 December 2012	Renegades	8 wickets	Docklands Stadium	23,589	Aaron Finch
6 January 2013	Renegades	9 wickets	MCG	46,581	Aaron Finch
20 December 2013	Stars	76 runs	MCG	25,266	Luke Wright
4 January 2014	Stars	9 wickets	Docklands Stadium	42,837	Cameron White
3 January 2015	Stars	112 runs	Docklands Stadium	33,734	Michael Beer
10 January 2015	Stars	3 wickets	MCG	37,323	Glenn Maxwell
2 January 2016	Stars	7 wickets	MCG	80,883	Luke Wright
9 January 2016	Stars	8 wickets	Docklands Stadium	43,176	Marcus Stoinis
1 January 2017	Renegades	7 runs (D/L)	MCG	71,162	Brad Hogg
7 January 2017	Stars	46 runs	Docklands Stadium	44,189	Adam Zampa
6 January 2018	Renegades	6 wickets	MCG	48,086	Mohammad Nabi
12 January 2018	Stars	23 runs	Docklands Stadium	44,316	Kevin Pietersen
1 January 2019	Stars	7 wickets	MCG	46,418	Marcus Stoinis
19 January 2019	Stars	6 wickets	Docklands Stadium	38,117	Marcus Stoinis
17 February 2019	Renegades	13 runs	Docklands Stadium	40,816	Daniel Christian
4 January 2020	Stars	7 wickets	MCG	54,478	Adam Zampa
10 January 2020	Stars	7 wickets	Docklands Stadium	30,388	Glenn Maxwell
17 January 2021	Stars	6 wickets	MCG	14,979	Liam Hatcher
20 January 2021	Renegades	5 wickets	Docklands Stadium	14,202	Mackenzie Harvey
3 January 2022	Renegades	5 wickets	MCG	21,562	Kane Richardson
13 January 2022	Stars	6 wickets	Docklands Stadium	10,014	Glenn Maxwell
3 January 2023	Renegades	33 runs	MCG	38,564	Tom Rogers
14 January 2023	Renegades	6 runs	Docklands Stadium	22,437	Kane Richardson
2 January 2024	Stars	8 wickets	MCG	27,024	Glenn Maxwell
13 January 2024	Renegades	6 wickets	Docklands Stadium	41,205	Shaun Marsh
5 January 2025	Stars	5 wickets	Docklands Stadium	40,636	Ben Duckett
12 January 2025	Stars	42 runs	MCG	38,031	Glenn Maxwell
4 January 2026	Renegades	4 runs	MCG	68,124	Josh Brown
10 January 2026	Stars	8 wickets runs	Docklands Stadium	42,846	Marcus Stoinis

== Season summaries ==
Chart of yearly table positions for Melbourne Stars in BBL

Season	W–L	Pos.	Finals	Coach	Captain	Most Runs	Most Wickets	Most Valuable Player	Refs
2011–12	4–3	4th	SF	Greg Shipperd	Cameron White	David Hussey and Rob Quiney – 243	James Faulkner – 13	–	
2012–13	5–3	3rd	SF	Greg Shipperd	Shane Warne (Note: Cameron White and James Faulkner stood in as acting captain for two games and one game respectively.)	Brad Hodge – 342	Lasith Malinga – 13	–	
2013–14	8–0*	1st*	SF	Greg Shipperd	Cameron White (Note: Brad Hodge stood in as acting captain for one game.)	Luke Wright – 288	Jackson Bird and John Hastings – 13	–	
2014–15	5–3	3rd	SF	Greg Shipperd	Cameron White	Kevin Pietersen – 293	John Hastings – 16*	–	
2015–16	5–3	2nd	RU	Stephen Fleming	David Hussey	Kevin Pietersen – 323	Adam Zampa – 12	Kevin Pietersen	
2016–17	4–4	4th	SF	Stephen Fleming	David Hussey	Kevin Pietersen – 268	Scott Boland – 14	Luke Wright	
2017–18	2–8	8th	DNQ	Stephen Fleming	John Hastings	Glenn Maxwell – 299	John Hastings – 10	Glenn Maxwell	
2018–19	7–7	4th	RU	Stephen Fleming	Glenn Maxwell (Note: Nic Maddinson stood in as acting captain for three games.)	Marcus Stoinis – 533	Dwayne Bravo – 15	Marcus Stoinis	
2019–20	10–4*	1st*	RU	David Hussey	Glenn Maxwell (Note: Peter Handscomb stood in as acting captain for one game.)	Marcus Stoinis – 705^	Haris Rauf and Adam Zampa – 20	Marcus Stoinis*	
2020–21	5–8	7th	DNQ	David Hussey	Glenn Maxwell	Marcus Stoinis – 396	Adam Zampa – 19	–	
2021–22	7–7	6th	DNQ	David Hussey	Glenn Maxwell (Note: Adam Zampa stood in as acting captain for one game.)	Glenn Maxwell – 468	Brody Couch – 16	Joe Clarke	
2022–23	3–11	8th	DNQ	David Hussey	Adam Zampa	Joe Clarke – 381	Luke Wood – 20	Joe Clarke	
2023–24	4–6	6th	DNQ	Peter Moores	Glenn Maxwell (Note: Marcus Stoinis stood in as acting captain for one game.)	Beau Webster – 262	Glenn Maxwell – 7	Hilton Cartwright and Glenn Maxwell	
2024–25	5–5	4th	KF	Peter Moores	Marcus Stoinis	Glenn Maxwell – 325	Mark Steketee – 15	Glenn Maxwell* (Note: Joint player of the tournament with Cooper Connolly.)	
2025–26	6–4	4th	KF	Peter Moores	Marcus Stoinis	Sam Harper – 381	Haris Rauf – 20*	Sam Harper*	

Legend
DNQ	Did not qualify	SF	Semi-finalists	*	Led the league
EF	Lost the Eliminator	RU	Runners-up	^	League record
KF	Lost the Knockout	CF	Lost the Challenger	C	Champions

=== Season results ===
Season	P	W	L	NR	Pts	NRR	Position	Finals
2011–12	7	4	3	0	8	+0.254	4th	Semi-finals
2012–13	8	5	3	0	10	+0.246	3rd	Semi-finals
2013–14	8	8	0	0	16	+2.189	1st	Semi-finals
2014–15	8	5	3	0	10	+0.336	4th	Semi-finals
2015–16	8	5	3	0	10	+0.366	2nd	Runners-up
2016–17	8	4	4	0	8	+0.397	4th	Semi-finals
2017–18	10	2	8	0	8	−0.926	8th	—
2018–19	14	7	7	0	14	−0.062	4th	Runners-up
2019–20	14	10	4	0	20	+0.526	1st	Runners-Up
2020–21	14	5	8	1	24	0.140	7th	—
2021–22	14	7	7	0	26	-0.222	6th	—
2022–23	14	3	11	0	6	-0.287	8th	—
2023-24	10	4	6	0	8	-1.051	6th	—
2024-25	10	5	5	0	10	0.135	4th	Knockout Final
2025-26	10	6	4	0	12	0.759	4th	Knockout Final

== Captains ==
There have been 11 captains in the Stars' history, including matches featuring an acting captain.

Captain	Span	M	Won	Lost	Tied	NR	W–L%
Cameron White	2011–15	27	18	9	0	0	66.67
Shane Warne	2012–13	6	3	3	0	0	50
James Faulkner	2013	1	0	1	0	0	0
Brad Hodge	2014	1	1	0	0	0	100
David Hussey	2015–17	19	10	9	0	0	52.63
John Hastings	2017–18	10	2	8	0	0	20
Glenn Maxwell	2018–24	65	34	30	0	1	53.13
Nic Maddinson	2019	3	0	3	0	0	0
Peter Handscomb	2020	1	0	1	0	0	0
Adam Zampa	2022–23	15	4	11	0	0	26.67
Marcus Stoinis	2023–26	23	11	121	0	0	47.83

== Home grounds ==
Venue	Games hosted by season															
Venue	01	02	03	04	05	06	07	08	09	10	11	12	13	14	15	Total
CitiPower Centre	0	0	0	0	0	0	0	0	0	0	1	0	0	0	0	1
Lavington Sports Ground	0	0	0	0	0	0	0	0	0	0	0	0	1	0	0	1
Corroboree Group Oval Manuka	0	0	0	0	0	0	0	0	0	0	0	0	0	1	1	2
Melbourne Cricket Ground	4	4	5	4	6	4	5	5	7	4	6	7	4	4	4	65
People First Stadium	0	0	0	0	0	0	0	1	1	0	0	0	0	0	0	2
Ted Summerton Reserve	0	0	0	0	0	0	0	1	1	0	0	0	0	0	0	2

== Current squad ==
The squad of the Melbourne Stars for the 2026–27 Big Bash League season as of 14 September 2026.

- Players with international caps are listed in **bold**.

No.	Name	Nat.	Birth Date	Batting Style	Bowling Style	Additional Info.
Batters
32	**Finn Allen**	New Zealand	22 April 1999 (age 27)	Right-handed	Right-arm off spin	International Signing
35	**Hilton Cartwright**	Australia	14 February 1992 (age 34)	Right-handed	Right-arm medium	
37	Campbell Kellaway	Australia	1 November 2002 (age 24)	Left-handed	Left-arm orthodox	
3	Tom Rogers	Australia	7 February 1999 (age 27)	Left-handed	Right-arm leg spin	
All-rounders
32	**Glenn Maxwell**	Australia	14 October 1988 (age 38)	Right-handed	Right-arm off spin	
7	**Craig Overton**	England	10 April 1994 (age 32)	Right-handed	Right-arm medium-fast	International Signing
88	**Jamie Overton**	England	10 April 1994 (age 32)	Right-handed	Right-arm fast	International Signing
16	**Marcus Stoinis**	Australia	16 August 1989 (age 37)	Right-handed	Right-arm fast	Captain
Wicket-keepers
6	Sam Harper	Australia	10 December 1996 (age 29)	Right-handed	—N/a	
Pace bowlers
41	Austin Anlezark	Australia	16 June 2005 (age 21)	Left-handed	Right-arm medium	
7	Liam Hatcher	Australia	17 December 1996 (age 29)	Right-handed	Right-arm fast	
64	**Peter Siddle**	Australia	25 November 1984 (age 41)	Right-handed	Right-arm fast	
4	**Mitch Swepson**	Australia	4 October 1993 (age 33)	Right-handed	Right-arm leg spin	

== Players ==
=== Australian representatives ===
(Australia) The following is a list of cricketers who have played for the Stars after making their debut in the national men's team (the period they spent as both a Stars squad member and an Australian-capped player is in brackets):

- Jackson Bird (BBL|01–04)
- David Hussey (BBL|01–06)
- Clint McKay (BBL|01–04)
- Matthew Wade (BBL|01–03)
- Shane Warne (BBL|01–02)
- Cameron White (BBL|01–04)
- Adam Voges (BBL|01)
- James Faulkner (BBL|02–07)
- John Hastings (BBL|02–07)
- Brad Hodge (BBL|02–03)
- Glenn Maxwell (BBL|02–16)
- Rob Quiney (BBL|02–07)
- James Muirhead (BBL|03)
- Michael Beer (BBL|04–08)
- Scott Boland (BBL|05–08, 13–15)
- Ben Hilfenhaus (BBL|05–06)
- Marcus Stoinis (BBL|05–16)
- Peter Handscomb (BBL|06–09, 13–14)
- Daniel Worrall (BBL|06–09)
- Adam Zampa (BBL|06–12)
- Ben Dunk (BBL|07–10)
- Nic Maddinson (BBL|08–10)
- Hilton Cartwright (BBL|09–16)
- Nathan Coulter-Nile (BBL|09–13)
- Billy Stanlake (BBL|10–11)
- Joe Burns (BBL|11–13)
- Joel Paris (BBL|13–14)
- Peter Siddle (BBL|14–16)
- Beau Webster (BBL|14)
- Mitch Swepson (BBL|15–16)

=== Overseas marquees ===
- (England) Jade Dernbach (BBL|01)
- (England) Luke Wright (BBL|01–07)
- (Sri Lanka) Lasith Malinga (BBL|02–03)
- (England) Dimitri Mascarenhas (BBL|02)
- (Pakistan) Mohammad Hafeez (BBL|03)
- (England) Kevin Pietersen (BBL|04–07)
- (Cricket West Indies) Dwayne Bravo (BBL|08)
- (Nepal) Sandeep Lamichhane (BBL|08–09)
- (England) Liam Plunkett (BBL|08)
- (Pakistan) Dilbar Hussain (BBL|09–10)
- (Pakistan) Haris Rauf (BBL|09–11, 13, 15)
- (South Africa) Dale Steyn (BBL|09)
- (Cricket West Indies) Andre Fletcher (BBL|10)
- (Afghanistan) Zahir Khan (BBL|10)
- (Cricket West Indies) Nicholas Pooran (BBL|10)
- (Afghanistan) Qais Ahmad (BBL|11)
- (England) Joe Clarke (BBL|11–12, 14–15)
- (Pakistan) Ahmed Daniyal (BBL|11)
- (Pakistan) Syed Faridoun (BBL|11)
- (Cricket West Indies) Andre Russell (BBL|11)
- (New Zealand) Trent Boult (BBL|12)
- (England) Luke Wood (BBL|12)
- (England) Liam Dawson (BBL|13)
- (England) Dan Lawrence (BBL|13–14)
- (Pakistan) Usama Mir (BBL|13–14)
- (England) Olly Stone (BBL|13)
- (Pakistan) Imad Wasim (BBL|13)
- (England) Tom Curran (BBL|14–15)
- (England) Ben Duckett (BBL|14)
- (New Zealand) Adam Milne (BBL|14)
- (England) Sam Hain (BBL|15)
- (New Zealand) Finn Allen (BBL|16)

== Honours ==
- Champions: 0
- Runners Up: 3 – BBL |05, BBL |08, BBL |09
- Minor Premiers: 2 – BBL |03, BBL |09
- Finals Series Appearances: 10 – BBL |01, BBL |02, BBL |03, BBL |04, BBL |05, BBL |06, BBL |08, BBL |09, BBL |14, BBL |15
- Wooden Spoons: 2 – BBL |07, BBL |12

== Statistics and awards ==
As of 13 September 2026

=== Team stats ===
- Win–loss record:

Opposition	M	Won	Lost	Tied	NR	W–L%
Adelaide Strikers	21	12	9	0	0	57.14
Brisbane Heat	22	8	14	0	0	36.36
Hobart Hurricanes	24	15	9	0	0	62.5
Melbourne Renegades	30	19	11	0	0	63.33
Perth Scorchers	25	8	16	0	1	33.33
Sydney Sixers	26	10	16	0	0	38.46
Sydney Thunder	23	11	12	0	0	47.83
Total	171	83	87	0	1	48.82

- Highest score in an innings: 2/273 (20 overs) vs Hobart Hurricanes, 19 January 2022
- Highest successful chase: 3/211 (19 overs) vs Adelaide Strikers, 21 November 2021
- Lowest successful defence: 8/134 (20 overs) vs Brisbane Heat, 31 December 2023
- Largest victory:
  - Batting first: 112 runs vs Melbourne Renegades, 3 January 2015
  - Batting second: 75 balls remaining vs Adelaide Strikers, 9 January 2014
- Longest winning streak: 8 matches (20 December 2013 – 27 January 2014 & 30 December 2019 – 18 January 2020)
- Longest losing streak: 8 matches (17 January 2017 – 9 January 2018 & 6 January – 28 December 2024)

=== Individual stats ===
- Most runs: Marcus Stoinis – 3,240
- Highest score in an innings: Glenn Maxwell – 154 (64) vs Hobart Hurricanes, 19 January 2022
- Highest partnership: Hilton Cartwright and Marcus Stoinis – 207 vs Sydney Sixers, 12 January 2020
- Most wickets: Adam Zampa – 98
- Best bowling figures in an innings: Lasith Malinga – 6/7 (4 overs) vs Perth Scorchers, 12 December 2012
- Hat-tricks taken:
  - Haris Rauf vs Sydney Thunder, 8 January 2020
- Most catches (fielder): Glenn Maxwell – 94
- Most dismissals (wicket-keeper): Peter Handscomb – 42 (31 catches, 11 stumpings)

=== Individual awards ===
- Player of the Match:
  - Glenn Maxwell – 17
  - Marcus Stoinis – 12
  - Luke Wright – 5
  - Kevin Pietersen – 4
  - Joe Clarke, Nick Larkin, Haris Rauf, and Adam Zampa – 3
  - Michael Beer, Nathan Coulter-Nile, Tom Curran, James Faulkner, Peter Handscomb, Sam Harper, Liam Hatcher, Ben Hilfenhaus, Brad Hodge, Clint McKay, and Rob Quiney – 2
  - Hilton Cartwright, Jackson Coleman, Ben Duckett, Ben Dunk, Andre Fletcher, John Hastings, David Hussey, Lasith Malinga, Andre Russell, Cameron White, and Daniel Worrall – 1
- BBL Player of the Tournament:
  - David Hussey – BBL|01
  - Marcus Stoinis – BBL|09
  - Glenn Maxwell – BBL|14
- BBL Team of the Tournament:
  - Glenn Maxwell (5) – BBL|07, BBL|08, BBL|09, BBL|10, BBL|14
  - Marcus Stoinis (5) – BBL|08, BBL|09, BBL|10, BBL|14, BBL|15
  - Luke Wright – BBL|05
  - Haris Rauf – BBL|09, BBL|15
  - Adam Zampa – BBL|10
  - Joe Clarke – BBL|11
  - Tom Curran – BBL|15
  - Sam Harper – BBL|15
  - Peter Siddle – BBL|15

== See also ==
- Melbourne Renegades
- Cricket Victoria
- Cricket in Victoria
- Victorian Cricket Team
- BBL
