= Cricket Victoria =

Sports governing body in Australia

- Sport: Cricket
- Jurisdiction: Victoria
- Founded: 29 September 1875; 150 years ago
- Affiliation: Cricket Australia
- Headquarters: Junction Oval
- Location: St Kilda, Victoria
- Chairman: Ross Hepburn
- CEO: Nick Cummins

Official website
- www.cricketvictoria.com.au
- (Victoria (state))
- (Australia)

Cricket Victoria (CV) is the governing body for the sport of cricket in the Australian state of Victoria. It is integrated with the Victorian Women's Cricket Association to include funding, programs, office accommodation and staff assistance.

The body was formed on 29 September 1875 as the Victorian Cricket Association, with its committee composed of delegates from leading metropolitan clubs. On 30 August 1895, the association's eight strongest clubs – Melbourne, East Melbourne, North Melbourne, South Melbourne, Fitzroy, Carlton, Richmond and St Kilda – seceded to form a new body known as the Victorian Cricket League; within a month, the new league had assumed the Victorian Cricket Association's name, assets and status as Victoria's governing body for cricket, and is considered to have a continuous history.

As of 2019, CV administered the 1,065 cricket clubs and 448,000 registered cricketers in Victoria, who compete across 75 cricket competitions. It employs well over a hundred full time and part time staff, and is responsible for offering professional and semi-professional contracts to several dozen of its male and female cricketers.

CV also administers the Victorian men's and women's representative teams, and the Victorian Premier Cricket competitions. It also owns and operates the Melbourne Stars and Melbourne Renegades Big Bash League teams.

== See also ==
- Cricket in Victoria

== Bibliography ==
- Barclays World of Cricket, (ed. E W Swanton), Willow Books, 1986
