= Greg Shipperd =

Australian cricketer and coach

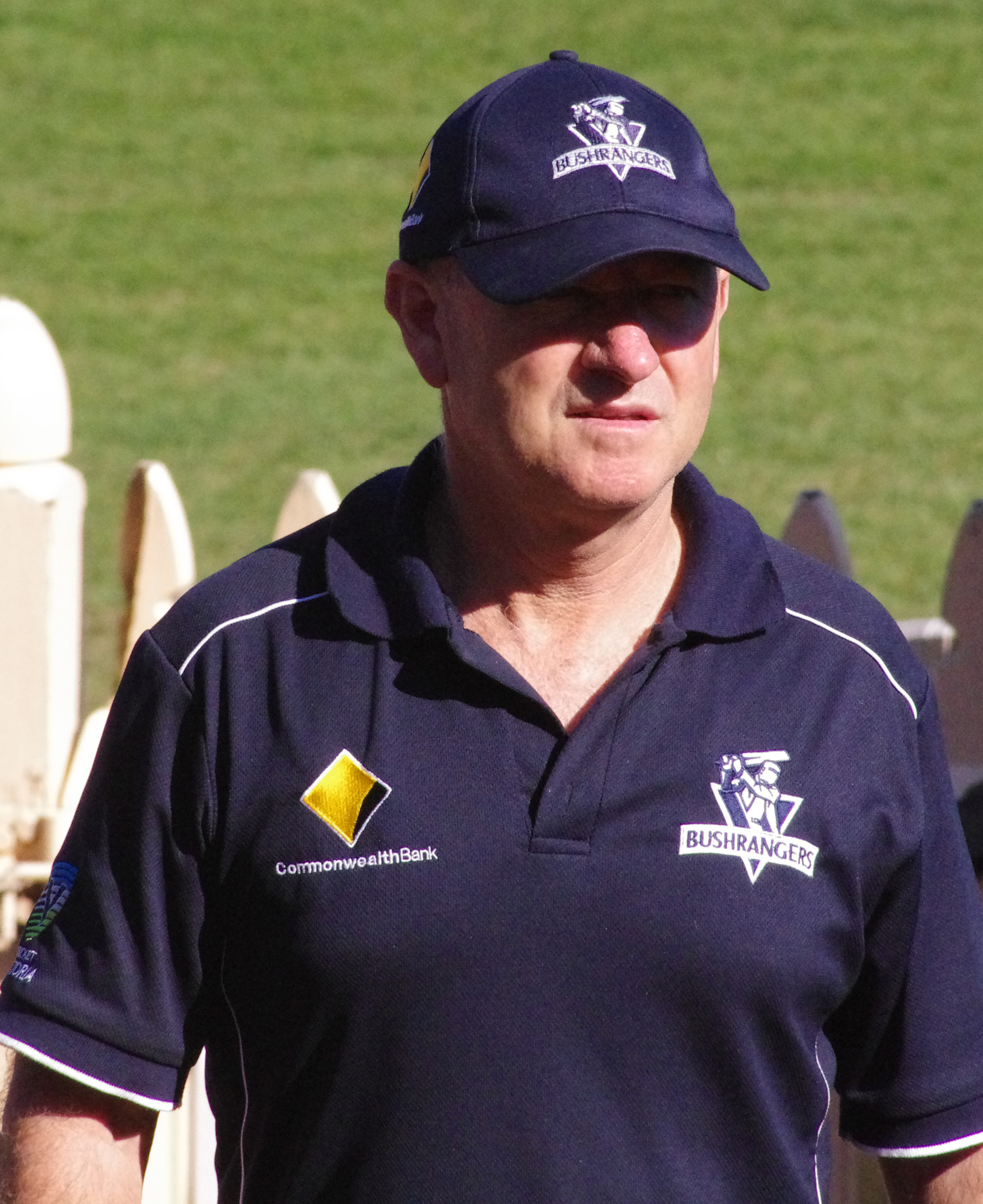
- Shipperd in 2011

Personal information
- Full name: Gregory Shipperd
- Born: 13 November 1956 (age 70); Subiaco, Western Australia
- Batting: Right-handed
- Role: Batsman

Domestic team information
- Years: Team
- 1977/78–1987/88: Western Australia
- 1988/89–1990/91: Tasmania

Career statistics
Competition	First-class	List A
Matches	112	29
Runs scored	6,806	875
Batting average	42.27	41.66
100s/50s	15/34	0/6
Top score	200*	86
Catches/stumpings	82/2	18/1
- Source: Cricinfo, 2 January 2011

Gregory Shipperd (born 13 November 1956) is an Australian cricket coach and former cricketer who is the current coach of the Sydney Sixers coaching them to the Big Bash League title in BBL09 in 2019–20. He was also the coach of Delhi Daredevils. As a player, he represented Western Australia from 1977–78 to 1984–85 and finished his career with Tasmania in 1990–91. He went on to coach Tasmania and Victoria, as well as had stints as coach of Twenty20 cricket franchises Melbourne Stars and Delhi Daredevils.

== Playing career ==
A right-handed top-order batsman, Shipperd never played a Test or ODI for Australia, but was part of two rebel tours to South Africa in 1985–86, and in 1986–87. On the 1985–86 tour Shipperd scored 397 runs at 28.35, with a top score of 79. On the second tour he played in one match, scoring 53 runs at 26.50.

In his 112 first-class cricket matches he made 6806 runs at 42.27. He was a member of the Western Australia team that won the Sheffield Shield in 1980–81 and in 1983–84. His highest score of 200 not out was made from 571 balls at the WACA, playing for Tasmania. In the same year he scored the slowest first-class century ever by an Australian, taking 481 minutes to score his hundred.

== Coaching career ==
=== Tasmania ===
Shipperd's first head coaching role was with Tasmania. He coached Tasmania for 11 seasons and guided them to their maiden Sheffield Shield final in 1993–94. Under Shipperd, Tasmania made the final again in 1997–98 and 2001–02.

=== Victoria ===
Moving back to Victoria, Shipperd became assistant coach of Victoria. He took over in 2004 when David Hookes was killed. He led Victoria their first Pura Cup title since 1990–91. In total he coached Victoria to 4 Sheffield Shield titles (2003/04, 2008/09, 2009/10, 2014/15), one National One-Day Cup (2010/11) and four Big Bash titles (2005/06, 2006/07, 2007/08, 2009/10). At the end of the 2014/15 season Victoria decided to part ways with Shipperd despite winning the Sheffield Shield.

=== Melbourne Stars ===
With the introduction of the Big Bash League for the 2011/12 season, Shipperd was named the inaugural coach of the Melbourne Stars. He led the Stars to the finals in all four seasons in charge but each time they were to suffer defeat in the semi-finals. After the 2014–15 Big Bash League season he was removed from his position as head coach.

=== Delhi Daredevils ===
Shipperd was the inaugural coach of the Delhi Daredevils in the Indian Premier League. He was head coach for four seasons.

=== Sydney Sixers ===
In August 2015, Shipperd was announced as the new head coach of the Sydney Sixers, taking over from Trevor Bayliss.

=== New South Wales ===
In November 2022, Shipperd was announced as the interim head coach of New South Wales, after Phil Jacques was dismissed.
