= Michael Beer (cricketer) =

Australian cricketer

Personal information
- Full name: Michael Anthony Beer
- Born: 9 June 1984 (age 42); Malvern, Victoria, Australia
- Nickname: Frothy
- Height: 1.87 m (6 ft 2 in)
- Batting: Right-handed
- Bowling: Slow left-arm orthodox
- Role: Bowler

International information
- National side: Australia (2011–2012)
- Test debut (cap 418): 3 January 2011 v England
- Last Test: 15 April 2012 v West Indies

Domestic team information
- Years: Team
- 2010/11–2014/15: Western Australia (squad no. 19)
- 2011/12–2013/14: Perth Scorchers
- 2014/15—2018/19: Melbourne Stars
- 2016/17: Victoria

Career statistics
Competition	Test	FC	LA	T20
Matches	2	30	27	71
Runs scored	6	293	65	40
Batting average	2.00	10.85	9.28	10.00
100s/50s	0/0	0/0	0/0	0/0
Top score	2*	29*	13*	11*
Balls bowled	406	6,049	1,427	1,618
Wickets	3	74	26	50
Bowling average	59.33	40.37	39.69	32.36
5 wickets in innings	0	1	0	0
10 wickets in match	0	0	0	0
Best bowling	2/56	7/46	3/39	3/13
Catches/stumpings	1/–	16/–	4/–	10/–
- Source: Cricinfo, 25 May 2019

Michael Anthony Beer (born 9 June 1984) is an Australian former cricketer who played for the Victorian cricket team. He played as a slow left-arm orthodox spin bowler. He made his Test cricket debut in the final match of the 2010–11 Ashes series. After several seasons playing for the Western Australian cricket team, in the 2016–17 season Beer returned to his home state of Victoria to continue his professional cricket career.

== Early life ==
Beer grew up in the Melbourne suburb of Malvern and played his junior cricket for Malvern Cricket Club in the Victorian Sub-District Cricket Association. His family had strong ties with the club and his father was part of the club's "Team of the Century". He attended De La Salle College, which resides opposite the Malvern Cricket Ground and graduated in 2002. He made his way into the club's First XI before leaving to play with Victorian Premier Cricket club St Kilda when he was 17.

== Domestic career ==
Beer had some success with St Kilda, taking over 100 wickets in two seasons and twice being selected in the Premier Cricket teams of the year. He was unable to make the Victorian cricket squad ahead of other spin bowling options such as Bryce McGain, Cameron White and Jon Holland. He did play some Second XI matches for Victoria in the Cricket Australia Cup and toured England with the Victorian Emerging Players in 2007. He won the Crusaders/Robert Rose Scholarship for 2006/07, having taken 43 wickets at a bowling average of 19.88. Following the 2009–10 domestic season, Beer moved from Victoria to Western Australia, where he was awarded a contract for the 2010–11 season with the Western Warriors. He made his debut in the Warriors first 2010–11 Ryobi Cup match against Victoria in October 2010.

In the 2016–17 season Beer represented Victoria in the Matador Cup domestic one day competition. In his first game for his home state, Beer took a hat trick, becoming only the seventh Australian domestic bowler to take a one-day domestic hat trick, taking it across two overs against South Australia at the WACA Ground.

== International career ==
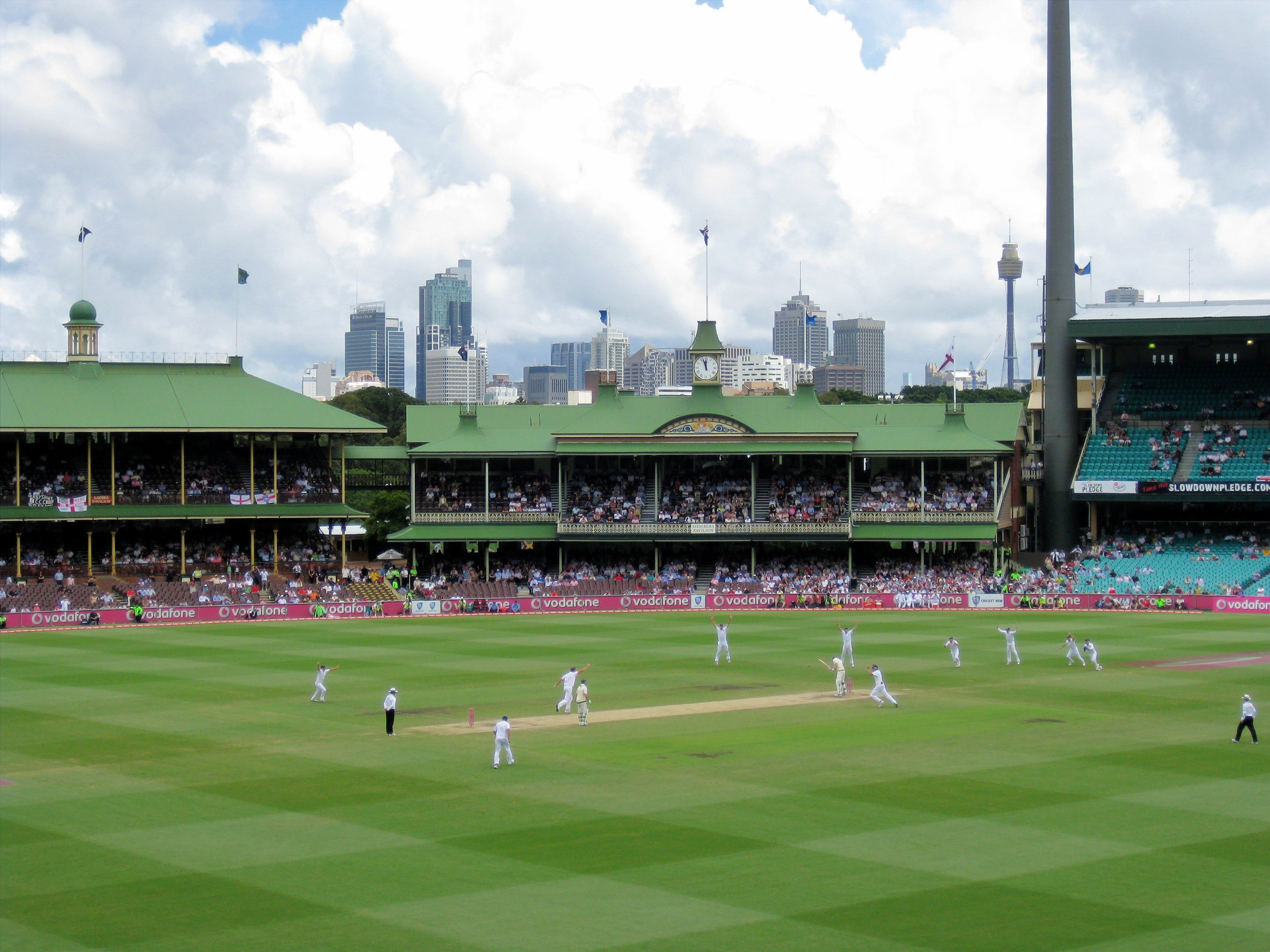
Chris Tremlett bowls Michael Beer to complete England's 3-1 Ashes victory on 7 January 2011

In December 2010, after playing only five first-class cricket games for Western Australia, he was named in the Australian Test Squad for the third Ashes Test to be played at the WACA Ground. His selection in the squad came a day after retired Australian champion spinner Shane Warne suggested that Beer be included in the side after performing well in the 2010–11 season, taking 16 wickets, including five against the touring English side in November 2010. Tasmanian spinner Xavier Doherty was omitted from the squad after taking only one wicket in Australia's loss to England in the Second Test. The move was highly criticised by some, including former Australian Test bowlers Stuart MacGill and Nathan Bracken. Beer was named as the twelfth man for the match as Australia decided to play four specialist fast bowlers. Along with batsman Usman Khawaja, he debuted in the fifth Test in Sydney, on 3 January 2011.

Beer was denied his maiden Test wicket when a catch by Ben Hilfenhaus at mid-off from England's opener Alastair Cook was overturned after a front-foot no ball. He claimed his first Test wicket by dismissing Paul Collingwood for 13, with the catch completed by Hilfenhaus at deep mid-on. Beer was the last batsman to be dismissed in Australia's second innings in the match, enabling England to complete a victory by an innings and 83 runs and a 3–1 series win. He had made two runs in the second innings to add to the two not out he had made in the first innings.

Beer was picked for Australia's 2012 tour to the West Indies. He was not picked for the first Test, but in the second Test, he opened the bowling in both West Indies' innings.
