= Rob Quiney =

Australian cricketer

Robert Quiney
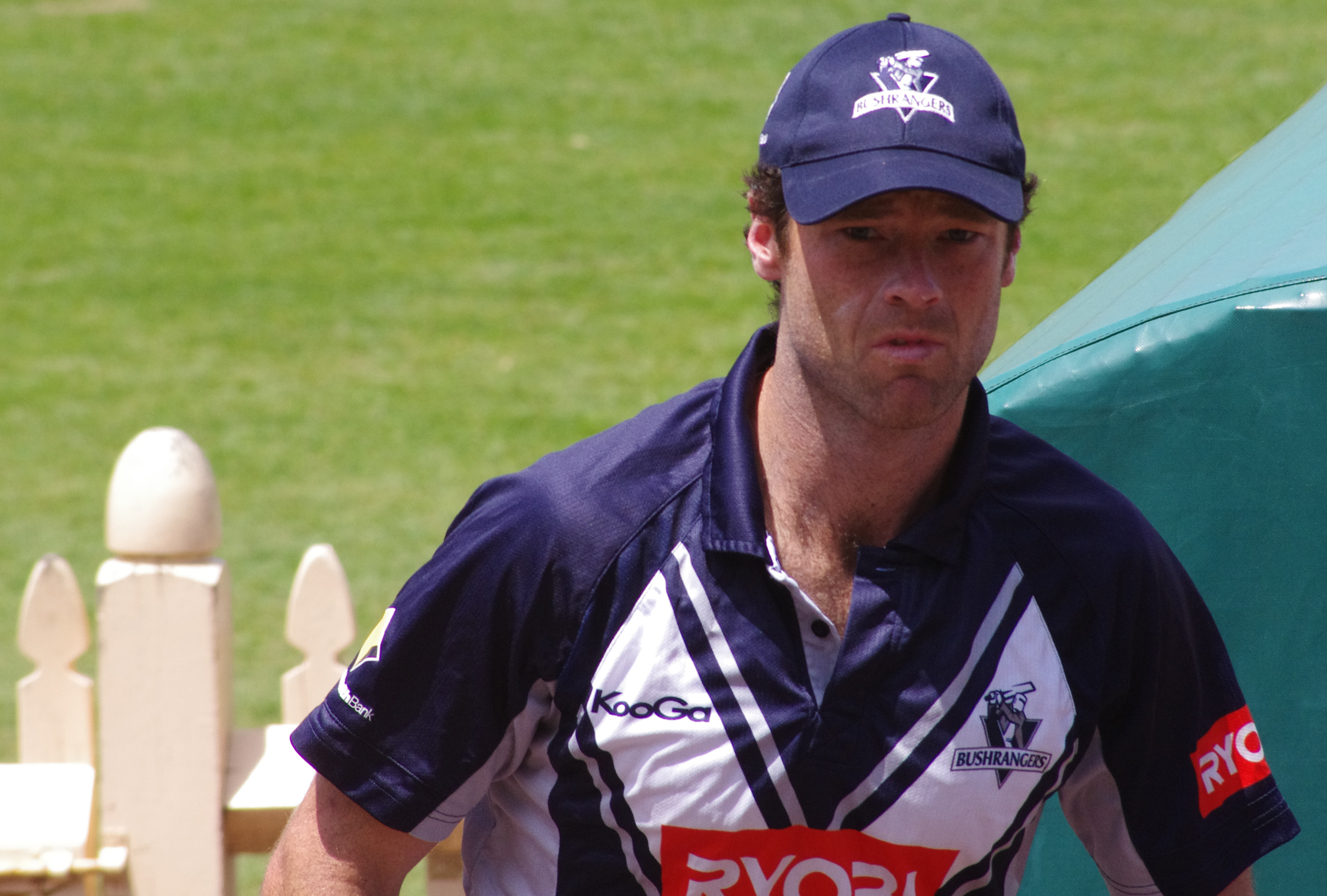

Personal information
- Full name: Robert John Quiney
- Born: 20 August 1982 (age 44); Brighton, Victoria, Australia
- Nickname: Bobby
- Height: 193 cm (6 ft 4 in)
- Batting: Left-handed
- Bowling: Right-arm medium
- Role: Batsman

International information
- National side: Australia
- Test debut (cap 429): 9 November 2012 v South Africa
- Last Test: 22 November 2012 v South Africa

Domestic team information
- Years: Team
- 2005/06–2016/17: Victoria
- 2009: Rajasthan Royals
- 2010/11–2011/12: Auckland
- 2011/12–2017/18: Melbourne Stars
- 2013: Essex

Career statistics
| Competition | Test | FC | LA | T20 |
|---|---|---|---|---|
| Matches | 2 | 96 | 78 | 82 |
| Runs scored | 9 | 5,674 | 2,680 | 1,349 |
| Batting average | 3.00 | 36.84 | 39.41 | 18.47 |
| 100s/50s | 0/0 | 11/35 | 3/23 | 0/7 |
| Top score | 9 | 153 | 122 | 97 |
| Balls bowled | 150 | 972 | 120 | 6 |
| Wickets | 0 | 4 | 0 | 0 |
| Bowling average | – | 112.25 | – | – |
| 5 wickets in innings | – | 0 | – | – |
| 10 wickets in match | – | 0 | – | – |
| Best bowling | – | 2/22 | – | – |
| Catches/stumpings | 5/– | 87/– | 38/– | 39/– |
- Source: ESPNcricinfo, 27 April 2022

Robert John Quiney (born 20 August 1982) is a former Australian cricketer who played two Test matches for Australia in the 2012–13 season. He played domestic first class and List A cricket for Victoria, and domestic Twenty20 cricket for the Melbourne Stars, Auckland Aces, Uthura Rudras and Rajasthan Royals. He was a tall (193 cm) left-handed batsman who also bowled right-arm medium pace. He played his last game for the Melbourne Stars on 27 January 2018, after which he retired from professional cricket.

== Cricket career ==
Quiney was first called up to the Victorian team in 2005, to play against the touring ICC World XI in a limited overs warm-up match for the ICC Super Series. He was run out for three. In the following season (2006–07), he became a regular member of Victoria's interstate limited overs side, and made his first-class debut against Tasmania in Hobart.

During the 2007–08 season, Quiney began to hold down a regular position in all forms of the game at interstate level, playing some important innings for Victoria, especially in the Ford Ranger Cup limited overs competition, in which he scored 89 not out off 57 balls against New South Wales at the MCG followed by 78 runs off 95 balls and 65 off 76 against Tasmania in Hobart and Melbourne respectively. In a Sheffield Shield match at the Melbourne Cricket Ground (MCG) against Tasmania in 2010–11, he scored a half century in the first innings and then 102 in the second innings. The century was his third in first-class cricket, but was unable to save Victoria from their first defeat in a Sheffield Shield match at the MCG for three years.

In 2011, Quiney was named Australia's Domestic Player of the Year, and was awarded his second Bill Lawry Medal for his performance for Victoria. In February 2012, he scored two centuries (114 and 119) in the one Sheffield Shield match against South Australia at the Adelaide Oval.

Early in the 2012–13 season, Quiney was selected for Australia A in a trial match against a touring South African XI, in which he made 85 runs. Soon after, he was selected to make his Test debut in the first Test against South Africa in Brisbane in November 2012, after batsman Shane Watson withdrew due to injury. South Africa batted first, making 450, but with the entire second day lost due to rain, Australia's innings didn't commence until after tea on day three. Batting at number 3, and facing the likes of Dale Steyn and Morne Morkel, he only managed 9 runs, in what was to be his only innings, which lasted 14 minutes and 12 deliveries with one boundary. Australia recovered from 3–40 to make 5-565 declared and the match ended in a draw.

He retained his place in the team for the second Test at the Adelaide Oval but, in another drawn match, he made a pair of ducks in a combined total of 10 deliveries faced, leaving his test average at 3.00 runs per innings. He was dropped for the third Test when Shane Watson returned from injury. After the retirement of Ricky Ponting, there were some calls for Quiney to replace him in the Australian XI.

In August 2017, Quiney retired from first-class cricket, after not getting a contract with Victoria ahead of the 2017–18 Sheffield Shield season. On 27 January 2018, Quiney played his last game for Melbourne Stars and the last game of his career.
