= Geoff Joshua =

Australian cricket umpire (born 1970)

Personal information
- Full name: Geoffrey Charles Joshua
- Born: 12 March 1970 (age 56); Richmond, Victoria, Australia

Umpiring information
- WTests umpired: 1 (2017)
- WODIs umpired: 5 (2014–2016)
- WT20Is umpired: 12 (2008–2017)
- Source: ESPNcricinfo, 21 September 2016

Geoff Joshua (born 12 March 1970) is an Australian cricket umpire. He has stood in matches in the Big Bash League tournament and in women's One Day International matches in the 2014–16 ICC Women's Championship.

In November 2017, along with Gerard Abood, he was one of the on-field umpires for the Women's Ashes Test match between Australia and England.
