= 2013–14 Sheffield Shield season =

Australian cricket tournament

2013–14 Sheffield Shield
- Dates: 30 October 2013 – 25 March 2014
- Administrator: Cricket Australia
- Cricket format: First-class
- Tournament format(s): Double round-robin and final
- Champions: New South Wales (46th title)
- Participants: 6
- Matches: 31
- Player of the series: Marcus North (Western Australia)
- Most runs: Marcus North (886) Western Australia
- Most wickets: Steve O'Keefe (41) New South Wales

The 2013–14 Sheffield Shield season was the 112th season of the Sheffield Shield, the Australian domestic first-class cricket competition. It was held after the conclusion of the Ryobi One-Day Cup and included a break halfway through for the entirety of the Big Bash League. As a part of Cricket Australia's campaign for day/night Tests, it included three day/night matches, played with the pink ball. The separation of the tournaments meant that players in the national Test squad only played two or three Shield matches before the first Test of the 2013–14 Ashes series.

== Points table ==
Team	Pld	W	L	D	FI	Pts	Quot
New South Wales	10	4	3	3	4	32	1.0651
Western Australia	10	4	3	3	1	26	1.0264
South Australia	10	3	2	5	4	26	1.0044
Queensland	10	3	2	5	3	24	1.1410
Tasmania	10	3	4	3	2	22	1.0029
Victoria	10	1	4	5	2	10	0.7895

== Group stage ==
Visitor team →	NSW	QLD	SA	TAS	VIC	WA
Home team ↓	NSW	QLD	SA	TAS	VIC	WA
New South Wales		Match drawn	SA; 6 wickets	Tasmania; 2 wickets	NSW; Inns & 48 runs	NSW; 3 wickets
Queensland	NSW; 150 runs		Queensland; 5 wickets	Match drawn	Queensland; 182 runs	Queensland; 250 runs
South Australia	Match drawn	Match drawn		Match drawn	Match drawn	Match drawn
Tasmania	NSW; 6 wickets	Tasmania; 183 runs	Tasmania; Inns & 316 runs		Victoria; 129 runs	WA; 84 runs
Victoria	Match drawn	Match drawn	SA; 7 wickets	Match drawn		Match drawn
Western Australia	WA; 8 wickets	Match drawn	SA; 108 runs	WA; 4 wickets	WA; Inns & 38 runs	

Home team won	Visitor team won

- Note: Results listed are according to the home (horizontal) and visitor (vertical) teams.
- Note: Click on a result to see a summary of the match.

=== Round 1 ===
30 October – 2 November 2013
Scorecard

(H) New South Wales	v	Tasmania
288 (101.5 overs); Michael Clarke 88 (190); Sam Rainbird 6/68 (23.5 overs)		239 (97.5 overs); Alex Doolan 56 (99); Doug Bollinger 6/62 (24 overs)
245 (72 overs); Scott Henry 65 (137); Clive Rose 4/64 (18 overs)		8/295 (86.2 overs); Alex Doolan 132 (195); Steve O'Keefe 3/52 (21.2 overs)

Tasmania won by 2 wickets
Blacktown International Sportspark, Sydney
Umpires: Ashley Barrow and Sam Nogajski
Player of the match: Alex Doolan (Tasmania)

- New South Wales won the toss and elected to bat
- Points: Tasmania 6, New South Wales 2

30 October – 2 November 2013
Scorecard

(H) South Australia	v	Queensland
387 (131 overs); Tom Cooper 171 (244); Luke Feldman 5/101 (30 overs)		465 (154 overs); Peter Forrest 129 (264); Johan Botha 5/114 (51 overs)
9/194 (71.5 overs); Michael Klinger 51 (105); Cameron Boyce 7/68 (27.5 overs)

Match drawn
Glenelg Oval, Glenelg East, South Australia
Umpires: Simon Fry and John Ward
Player of the match: Cameron Boyce (Queensland)

- South Australia won the toss and elected to bat
- Points: Queensland 2, South Australia 0
- First class debut: Kelvin Smith (South Australia)

30 October – 2 November 2013
Scorecard

(H) Victoria	v	Western Australia
312 (88.4 overs); Cameron White 83 (123); Jason Behrendorff 4/62 (20.4 overs)		270 (83.1 overs); John Rogers 95 (161); Fawad Ahmed 6/68 (16.1 overs)
8/338d (98 overs); Rob Quiney 89 (198); Michael Hogan 3/71 (21 overs)		8/244 (103 overs); Marcus North 118* (314); Cameron White 4/38 (17 overs)

Match drawn
Melbourne Cricket Ground, Melbourne
Umpires: Gerard Abood and Geoff Joshua
Player of the match: Marcus North (Western Australia)

- Western Australia won the toss and elected to field
- Points: Victoria 2, Western Australia 0
- First class debuts: Cameron Bancroft and William Bosisto (Western Australia)

=== Round 2 ===
6–9 November 2013
Scorecard

Tasmania	v	Queensland (H)
407 (140.3 overs); Jordan Silk 107 (250); Cameron Gannon 5/53 (25.3 overs)		303 (99.2 overs); Chris Lynn 81 (166); Andrew Fekete 4/74 (23.2 overs)
5/270d (79 overs); Ben Dunk 81* (79); James Hopes 2/33 (17 overs)		0/168 (42 overs); Chris Lynn 72* (104)

Match drawn
Allan Border Field, Brisbane
Umpires: Gerard Abood and Tony Ward
Player of the match: Jordan Silk (Tasmania)

- Tasmania won the toss and elected to bat
- First class debuts: Nick Stevens (Queensland) and Andrew Fekete (Tasmania)
- Points: Tasmania 2, Queensland 0

6–9 November 2013
Scorecard

South Australia	v	Western Australia (H)
222 (68.4 overs); Travis Head 51 (46); Jason Behrendorff 4/58 (19 overs)		230 (90.3 overs); Marcus North 50 (140); Johan Botha 4/47 (16 overs)
326 (98.5 overs); Travis Head 92 (143); Michael Hogan 3/63 (24 overs)		210 (70 overs); Sam Whiteman 47* (40); Chadd Sayers 4/34 (20 overs)

South Australia won by 108 runs
Western Australia Cricket Association Ground, Perth, Western Australia
Umpires: Ashley Barrow and Ian Lock
Player of the match: Chadd Sayers (South Australia)

- South Australia won the toss and elected to bat
- First class debuts: Trent Lawford and James Munting (South Australia)
- Points: South Australia 6, Western Australia 2

6–9 November 2013
Scorecard

(H) Victoria	v	New South Wales
236 (96 overs); Chris Rogers 88 (213); Sean Abbott 3/60 (15 overs)		353 (94 overs); Steve Smith 107 (169); John Hastings 5/61 (24 overs)
4/356d (122 overs); Chris Rogers 117 (235); Stephen O'Keefe 2/51 (21 overs)		0/94 (18 overs); David Warner 51* (45)

Match drawn
Melbourne Cricket Ground, Melbourne
Umpires: Michael Graham-Smith and Mick Martell
Player of the match: Chris Rogers (Victoria)

- Victoria won the toss and elected to bat
- Points: New South Wales 2, Victoria 0

=== Round 3 ===
13–16 November 2013
Scorecard

New South Wales	v	Queensland (H)
386 (98.1 overs); Nic Maddinson 87 (108); James Hopes 2/48 (17.1 overs)		222 (67 overs); Usman Khawaja 58 (77); Trent Copeland 5/49 (20 overs)
8/270d (58 overs); Nic Maddinson 72 (96); Alister McDermott 4/44 (12 overs)		284 (98.2 overs); Chris Hartley 78* (165); Stephen O'Keefe 3/60 (20 overs)

New South Wales won by 150 runs
Brisbane Cricket Ground, Woolloongabba, Brisbane
Umpires: Geoff Joshua and Paul Wilson
Player of the match: Trent Copeland (New South Wales)

- New South Wales won the toss and elected to bat.
- Points: New South Wales 6, Queensland 0

13–16 November 2013
Scorecard

Western Australia	v	South Australia (H)
434 (132.2 overs); Marcus North 110 (213); Johan Botha 4/120 (38 overs)		601 (161.4 overs); Phillip Hughes 204 (393); Nathan Rimmington 3/86 (26.4 overs)
3/202 (80 overs); Marcus North 84* (228); Joe Mennie 1/16 (13 overs)

Match drawn
Adelaide Oval, Adelaide
Umpires: Damien Mealey and Tony Ward
Player of the match: Phillip Hughes (South Australia)

- Western Australia won the toss and elected to bat.
- Points: South Australia 2, Western Australia 0

13–16 November 2013
Scorecard

Victoria	v	Tasmania (H)
383 (136.2 overs); Matthew Wade 119 (208); Xavier Doherty 4/62 (33 overs)		250 (81.5 overs); Tim Paine 66* (119); Fawad Ahmed 3/76 (21.5 overs)
6/203d (48 overs); Rob Quiney 86 (140); Adam Maher 2/39 (9 overs)		207 (65.1 overs); James Faulkner 53 (88); Daniel Christian 3/60 (16 overs)

Victoria won by 129 runs
Bellerive Oval, Hobart
Umpires: Ian Lock and Sam Nogajski
Player of the match: Rob Quiney (Victoria)

- Tasmania won the toss and elected to field.
- Points: Victoria 6, Tasmania 0
- Matthew Wade was suspended for one match for tampering with the pitch while batting.

=== Round 4 ===
22–25 November 2013
Scorecard

(H) Western Australia	v	Victoria
581/8 (142.2 overs); Marcus North 145 (269); Jake Haberfield 3/118 (26 overs)		198 (70.5 overs); David Hussey 85 (122); Nathan Coulter-Nile 4/57 (16 overs)
		345 (f/o) (95.4 overs); Cameron White 131 (155); Nathan Coulter-Nile 4/53 (20 overs)

Western Australia won by an innings and 38 runs
Western Australia Cricket Association Ground, Perth, Western Australia
Umpires: Simon Fry and Wayne Knights
Player of the match: Marcus North (Western Australia)

- Victoria won the toss and elected to field.
- Points: Western Australia 6, Victoria 0

22–25 November 2013
Scorecard

(H) New South Wales	v	Queensland
397/9 (125.1 overs); Ryan Carters 154 (316); Cameron Boyce 3/80 (19.1 overs)		306 (96.1 overs); Peter Forrest 97 (268); Stephen O'Keefe 3/44 (26 overs)
221/9 (62.3 overs); Nic Maddinson 67 (86); Nathan Hauritz 4/93 (27.3 overs)		123/3 (35 overs); Chris Lynn 40* (68); Doug Bollinger 1/20 (7 overs)

Match drawn
Sydney Cricket Ground, Sydney
Umpires: Mick Martell and Damien Mealey
Player of the match: Ryan Carters (New South Wales)

- New South Wales won the toss and elected to bat.
- Points: New South Wales 2, Queensland 0

22–25 November 2013
Scorecard

Tasmania	v	South Australia (H)
291 (127.2 overs); Ed Cowan 68 (158); Adam Zampa 3/71 (22.2 overs)		397 (110.3 overs); Travis Head 98 (135); Xavier Doherty 5/96 (22.3 overs)
390/7 (90 overs); Ed Cowan 123 (178); Johan Botha 3/90 (28 overs)		208/5 (46 overs); Tom Cooper 74* (94); James Faulkner 2/33 (10 overs)

Match drawn
Adelaide Oval, Adelaide
Umpires: Michael Graham-Smith and Ian Lock
Player of the match: Travis Head (South Australia)

- Tasmania won the toss and elected to bat.
- Points: South Australia 2, Tasmania 0

=== Round 5 ===
29 November – 2 December 2013
Scorecard

(H) Western Australia	v	Queensland
254 (80.2 overs); Mitchell Marsh 96 (159); Luke Feldman 4/58 (19.2 overs)		401 (118.4 overs); Luke Pomersbach 159 (281); Michael Hogan 3/69 (21 overs)
5/447d (133.3 overs); Adam Voges 235* (322); James Hopes 3/73 (30.3 overs)		2/81 (30 overs); Luke Pomersbach 40 (42); Ashton Agar 2/22 (11 overs)

Match drawn
Western Australia Cricket Association Ground, Perth, Western Australia
Umpires: Gerard Abood and Ashley Barrow
Player of the match: Luke Pomersbach (Queensland)

- Western Australia won the toss and elected to bat.
- Points: Queensland 2, Western Australia 0

29 November – 2 December 2013
Scorecard

(H) Tasmania	v	New South Wales
354 (113 overs); Ben Dunk 89 (166); Steve O'Keefe 4/74 (26 overs)		264 (103.2 overs); Trent Copeland 58 (106); Xavier Doherty 3/37 (25.2 overs)
164 (46.1 overs); Mark Cosgrove 81 (106); Sean Abbott 4/36 (12 overs)		4/255 (80.5 overs); Ryan Carters 100 (196); Sam Rainbird 3/52 (21 overs)

New South Wales won by 6 wickets
Bellerive Oval, Hobart
Umpires: Ian Lock and Paul Wilson
Player of the match: Sean Abbott (New South Wales)

- Tasmania won the toss and elected to bat.
- Points: New South Wales 6, Tasmania 2

29 November – 2 December 2013
Scorecard

(H) Victoria	v	South Australia
118 (45.3 overs); Daniel Christian 39 (60); Gary Putland 3/16 (10.3 overs)		343 (108.3 overs); Callum Ferguson 110 (187); Scott Boland 4/62 (28 overs)
404 (146.1 overs); Aaron Finch 97 (248); Chadd Sayers 3/76 (27.1 overs)		3/183 (45.1 overs); Michael Klinger 73* (130); Rob Quiney 1/1 (2 overs)

South Australia won by 7 wickets
Melbourne Cricket Ground, Melbourne
Umpires: Sam Nogajski and Tony Ward

- Victoria won the toss and elected to bat.
- Points: South Australia 6, Victoria 0

=== Round 6 ===
8–11 December 2013
Scorecard

(H) Queensland	v	Victoria
8/382d (123.3 overs); Joe Burns 75 (177); Scott Boland 3/56 (23 overs)		371 (108.2 overs); David Hussey 77 (109); Alister McDermott 5/78 (25 overs)
6/313d (67 overs); Joe Burns 102 (149); David Hussey 2/25 (4 overs)		142 (49.5 overs); David Hussey 39 (53); Luke Feldman 4/36 (10.5 overs)

Queensland won by 182 runs
Brisbane Cricket Ground, Woolloongabba, Brisbane
Umpires: Michael Graham-Smith and Geoff Joshua
Player of the match: Joe Burns (Queensland)

- Queensland won the toss and elected to bat.
- Points: Queensland 6, Victoria 0

8–11 December 2013
Scorecard

(H) New South Wales	v	South Australia
373 (93.3 overs); Moisés Henriques 127 (158); Joe Mennie 4/60 (18.3 overs)		426 (136.2 overs); Phillip Hughes 118 (277); Trent Copeland 4/92 (38 overs)
148 (49.5 overs); Ben Rohrer 40 (69); Gary Putland 4/35 (9 overs)		4/100 (31.2 overs); Callum Ferguson 45* (68); Sean Abbott 3/42 (10 overs)

South Australia won by 6 wickets
Sydney Cricket Ground, Sydney
Umpires: Damien Mealey and John Ward
Player of the match: Phillip Hughes (South Australia)

- South Australia won the toss and elected to field.
- First class debut: Manjot Singh (New South Wales)
- Points: South Australia 6, New South Wales 0

8–11 December 2013
Scorecard

Western Australia	v	Tasmania (H)
258 (89.5 overs); Cam Bancroft 93 (190); Evan Gulbis 3/44 (19 overs)		196 (47.1 overs); Evan Gulbis 80 (73); Mitchell Marsh 4/19 (7 overs)
187 (76.4 overs); Mitchell Marsh 70 (163); Andrew Fekete 4/54 (21 overs)		166 (52.3 overs); Alex Doolan 75 (102); Michael Hogan 5/37 (14.3 overs)

Western Australia won by 84 runs
Bellerive Oval, Hobart
Umpires: Greg Davidson and Paul Wilson
Player of the match: Mitchell Marsh (Western Australia)

- Tasmania won the toss and elected to field.
- First class debut: Simon Mackin (Western Australia)
- Points: Western Australia 6, Tasmania 0

=== Round 7 ===
12–15 February 2014
Scorecard

South Australia	v	Queensland (H)
403 (126 overs); Tom Cooper 175 (275); James Hopes 4/71 (30 overs)		135 (49.3 overs); Chris Hartley 33 (98); Joe Mennie 3/31 (9 overs)
6/202d (49 overs); Callum Ferguson 70* (76); James Hopes 2/47 (14 overs)		5/471 (143.2 overs); Usman Khawaja 182* (320); Chadd Sayers 1/69 (35 overs)

Queensland won by 5 wickets
Brisbane Cricket Ground, Woolloongabba, Brisbane
Umpires: Gerard Abood and Anil Chaudhary (India)
Player of the match: Usman Khawaja (Queensland)

- Queensland won the toss and elected to field.

12–15 February 2014
Scorecard

Tasmania	v	Western Australia (H)
248 (72.5 overs); Mark Cosgrove 71 (90); Michael Hogan 4/55 (17 overs)		279 (93.3 overs); Marcus North 87 (199); Ben Hilfenhaus 6/82 (23.3 overs)
286 (95 overs); George Bailey 83 (186); Mitchell Marsh 4/35 (13 overs)		6/259 (91.4 overs); Marcus North 79 (174); Andrew Fekete 2/54 (15 overs)

Western Australia won by 4 wickets
Western Australia Cricket Association Ground, Perth, Western Australia
Umpires: Damien Mealey and Tony Ward
Player of the match: Marcus North (Western Australia)

- Tasmania won the toss and elected to bat.

12–15 February 2014
Scorecard

Victoria	v	New South Wales (H)
218 (50.1 overs); Glenn Maxwell 94 (95); Sean Abbott 3/44 (7 overs)		9/452d (121 overs); Peter Nevill 100* (134); John Hastings 3/58 (22 overs)
186 (51.4 overs); Glenn Maxwell 127 (102); Trent Copeland 3/24 (13 overs)

New South Wales won by an innings and 48 runs
Sydney Cricket Ground, Sydney
Umpires: Allahudien Paleker (SA) and John Ward
Player of the match: Peter Nevill (New South Wales)

- New South Wales won the toss and elected to field.

=== Round 8 ===
20–23 February 2014
Scorecard

New South Wales	v	Western Australia (H)
344 (107.5 overs); Ryan Carters 104 (210); Jason Behrendorff 5/65 (23.5 overs)		462 (138.1 overs); Adam Voges 155 (298); Sean Abbott 4/71 (20.1 overs)
126 (53.3 overs); Ryan Carters 37 (132); Jason Behrendorff 4/35 (13.3 overs)		2/10 (2.1 overs); Adam Voges 4* (2); Manjot Singh 2/6 (1.1 overs)

Western Australia won by 8 wickets
Western Australia Cricket Association Ground, Perth, Western Australia
Umpires: Anil Chaudhary (India) and Mick Martell
Player of the match: Adam Voges (Western Australia)

- New South Wales won the toss and elected to bat.

20–23 February 2014
Scorecard

(H) South Australia	v	Victoria
6/511d (145 overs); Michael Klinger 213 (403); Glenn Maxwell 3/52 (11 overs)		309 (98 overs); Glenn Maxwell 119 (162); Kane Richardson 4/51 (26 overs)
		7/334 (128 overs); Matthew Wade 71* (164); Joe Mennie 3/18 (9.4 overs)

Match drawn
Adelaide Oval, Adelaide
Umpires: Ashley Barrow and Sam Nogajski
Player of the match: Michael Klinger (South Australia)

- South Australia won the toss and elected to bat.

20–23 February 2014
Scorecard

(H) Tasmania	v	Queensland
350 (134.4 overs); Ed Cowan 93 (223); Ben Cutting 4/54 (25.5 overs)		183 (76.4 overs); Joe Burns 90* (225); Ben Hilfenhaus 4/50 (20 overs)
9/165d (62 overs); Jonathan Wells 43 (96); James Hopes 5/59 (23 overs)		149 (50.4 overs); Cameron Boyce 65 (56); Sam Rainbird 4/40 (14 overs

Tasmania won by 183 runs
Bellerive Oval, Hobart
Umpires: Geoff Joshua and Allahudien Paleker (SA)
Player of the match: Ed Cowan (Tasmania)

- Queensland won the toss and elected to field.

=== Round 9 ===
3–6 March 2014 (D/N)
Scorecard

(H) Queensland	v	Western Australia
391 (129 overs); Peter Forrest 133 (239); Jason Behrendorff 5/105 (27 overs)		175 (72 overs); Ashton Turner 41 (83); James Hopes 6/45 (21 overs)
3/178d (50 overs); Usman Khawaja 74* (118); Nathan Rimmington 2/34 (13 overs)		144 (65.4 overs); Adam Voges 41 (110); Luke Feldman 4/26 (15 overs)

Queensland won by 250 runs
Brisbane Cricket Ground, Woolloongabba, Brisbane
Umpires: Michael Graham-Smith and Sam Nogajski
Player of the match: Peter Forrest (Queensland)

- Western Australia won the toss and elected to field.

3–6 March 2014 (D/N)
Scorecard

(H) South Australia	v	New South Wales
288 (105.2 overs); Callum Ferguson 97 (221); Steve O'Keefe 5/89 (36.2 overs)		292 (107 overs); Kurtis Patterson 81 (195); Johan Botha 4/70 (34 overs)
280 (77 overs); Tom Cooper 89 (141); Steve O'Keefe 6/70 (27 overs)		9/207 (87 overs); Ryan Carters 84 (175); Johan Botha 4/51 (35 overs)

Match drawn
Adelaide Oval, Adelaide
Umpires: Damien Mealey and John Ward

- South Australia won the toss and elected to bat.

3–6 March 2014 (D/N)
Scorecard

Tasmania	v	Victoria (H)
206 (72 overs); Mark Cosgrove 55 (83); Fawad Ahmed 4/49 (18 overs)		9/523d (158.1 overs); Marcus Stoinis 170 (274); Xavier Doherty 4/130 (46.1 overs)
7/291 (145.4 overs); Luke Butterworth 107* (314); Scott Boland 2/42 (29.4 overs)

Match drawn
Melbourne Cricket Ground, Melbourne
Umpires: Ian Lock and Tony Ward

- Tasmania won the toss and elected to bat.

=== Round 10 ===
11–14 March 2014
Scorecard

Western Australia	v	New South Wales (H)
82 (35.4 overs); Ashton Turner 25 (39); Josh Hazlewood 4/14 (8.4 overs)		186 (79.5 overs); Steve Smith 48 (114); Ashton Agar 5/74 (24.5 overs)
316 (126 overs); Shaun Marsh 113 (246); Josh Hazlewood 3/53 (31 overs)		7/213 (78 overs); Steve Smith 89 (161); Marcus North 3/61 (23 overs)

New South Wales won by 3 wickets
Manuka Oval, Canberra
Umpires: Gerard Abood and Paul Wilson
Player of the match: Steve Smith (New South Wales)

- Western Australia won the toss and elected to bat.

11–14 March 2014
Scorecard

South Australia	v	Tasmania (H)
212 (55 overs); Andrew McDonald 83 (107); Jackson Bird 6/50 (17 overs)		651 (168.5 overs); Evan Gulbis 229 (293); Chadd Sayers 4/145 (39 overs)
123 (47.1 overs); Phillip Hughes 39 (99); Evan Gulbis 4/7 (8.1 overs)

Tasmania won by an innings and 316 runs
Bellerive Oval, Hobart
Umpires: Geoff Joshua and Mick Martell
Player of the match: Evan Gulbis (Tasmania)

- South Australia won the toss and elected to bat.

11–14 March 2014
Scorecard

(H) Victoria	v	Queensland
210 (83.3 overs); David Hussey 58 (94); James Hopes 6/40 (21.3 overs)		8/483d (156.1 overs); Peter Forrest 155* (324); John Hastings 4/102 (30.1 overs)
2/314 (124 overs); Rob Quiney 143* (379); Luke Feldman 1/34 (16 overs)

Match drawn
Melbourne Cricket Ground, Melbourne
Umpires: Simon Fry and John Ward
Player of the match: Rob Quiney (Victoria)

- Victoria won the toss and elected to bat.

== Final ==
21–25 March 2014
Scorecard

(H) New South Wales	v	Western Australia
447 (168.5 overs); Moisés Henriques 140 (314); Jason Behrendorff 4/95 (33 overs)		180 (84.5 overs); Mitchell Marsh 92* (211); Josh Hazlewood 6/50 (22 overs)
4/197 (77 overs); Steve Smith 103* (229); Jason Behrendorff 2/48 (16 overs)

Match Drawn; New South Wales won title by finishing higher on the ladder.
Manuka Oval, Canberra
Umpires: Simon Fry and John Ward
Player of the match: Moisés Henriques (NSW)

- New South Wales won the toss and elected to bat.
