= 2014–15 Matador BBQs One-Day Cup =

2014 Matador BBQs One-Day Cup
- Dates: 4 October 2014 – 26 October 2014
- Administrator: Cricket Australia
- Cricket format: List A
- Tournament format: Round-robin tournament
- Host(s): Brisbane, Sydney
- Champions: Western Australia (12th title)
- Participants: 6
- Matches: 23
- Player of the series: Cameron White (Victoria)
- Most runs: Usman Khawaja (QLD) (523 runs)
- Most wickets: Gurinder Sandhu (NSW) (15 wickets)

The 2014 Matador BBQs One-Day Cup was the 45th season of the official List A domestic cricket competition in Australia. It was played over a four-week period at the start of the domestic season to separate its schedule from the Sheffield Shield, held after the tournament's conclusion. The tournament was held in Sydney and Brisbane, with most matches broadcast live on free-to-air television on GEM. Western Australia defeated New South Wales in the final to win the title for the first time in 11 years.

== Points table ==
Pos	Team	Pld	W	L	T	NR	BP	Pts	NRR
1	Western Australia (C)	7	5	1	0	1	3	25	0.937
2	Queensland	7	5	2	0	0	4	24	1.104
3	New South Wales	7	4	2	0	1	0	18	−0.224
4	Tasmania	7	2	4	0	1	2	12	−0.080
5	Victoria	7	2	5	0	0	0	7.5	−1.207
6	South Australia	7	1	5	0	1	0	6	−0.570

(C) Champions

== Fixtures ==
4 October
09:30
Scorecard

Victoria; 111 (38 overs)	v	Queensland; 1/112 (21.2 overs)
Peter Handscomb 20 (63); Mark Steketee 4/29 (8 overs)		Chris Hartley 46* (73); Jon Holland 1/25 (5 overs)

Queensland won by 9 wickets
Brisbane Cricket Ground, Woolloongabba, Brisbane
Umpires: Geoff Davidson and Sam Nogajski
Player of the match: Mark Steketee (Qld)

- Queensland won the toss and elected to field.

4 October
09:30
Scorecard

South Australia; 244 (49.4 overs)	v	New South Wales; 6/246 (48.1 overs)
Callum Ferguson 82 (99); Josh Hazlewood 7/36 (9.4 overs)		Nic Maddinson 84 (54); Travis Head 2/9 (3 overs)

New South Wales won by 4 wickets
Allan Border Field, Brisbane
Umpires: Michael Graham-Smith and Mick Martell
Player of the match: Josh Hazlewood (NSW)

- New South Wales won the toss and elected to field.

6 October
09:30
Scorecard

Queensland; 190 (42.3 overs)	v	New South Wales; 6/194 (47.3 overs)
Nathan Reardon 45 (76); Moises Henriques 3/28 (8 overs)		Ben Rohrer 52 (59); Jason Floros 2/32 (9 overs)

New South Wales won by 4 wickets
Allan Border Field, Brisbane
Umpires: Damien Mealey and Sam Nogajski
Player of the match: Peter Nevill (NSW)

- Queensland won the toss and elected to bat.

6 October
13:00 (D/N)
Scorecard

South Australia; 8/299 (50 overs)	v	Victoria; 6/302 (48.3 overs)
Alex Ross 65 (58); John Hastings 3/37 (10 overs)		Cameron White 102* (101); Johan Botha 2/41 (9.3 overs)

Victoria won by 4 wickets
Brisbane Cricket Ground, Woolloongabba, Brisbane
Umpires: Simon Fry and Mick Martell
Player of the match: Cameron White (Vic)

- South Australia won the toss and elected to bat.
- Victoria docked 0.5 of a point for slow-over rate

8 October
09:30
Scorecard

South Australia; 147 (27.3 overs)	v	Western Australia; 7/150 (36.1 overs)
Trent Lawford 61 (44); Joel Paris 3/34 (7 overs)		Marcus Harris 34 (35); Adam Zampa 4/18 (10 overs)

Western Australia won by 3 wickets
Brisbane Cricket Ground, Woolloongabba, Brisbane
Umpires: Michael Graham-Smith and Sam Nogajski
Player of the match: Adam Zampa (SA)

- Western Australia won the toss and elected to field.

8 October
09:30
Scorecard

Tasmania; 7/287 (50 overs)	v	Victoria; 155 (29.2 overs)
Jonathan Wells 110* (95); Scott Boland 3/31 (9 overs)		Clint McKay 57 (49); Sam Rainbird 5/29 (8.2 overs)

Tasmania won by 132 runs
Allan Border Field, Brisbane
Umpires: Simon Fry and Tony Wilds
Player of the match: Jonathan Wells (Tas)

- Victoria won the toss and elected to field.

10 October
13:00 (D/N)
Scorecard

Queensland; 243 (49.3 overs)	v	New South Wales; 5/244 (49.3 overs)
Simon Milenko 54 (39); Doug Bollinger 3/30 (9 overs)		Peter Nevill 74 (92); Peter George 3/30 (10 overs)

New South Wales won by 5 wickets
Brisbane Cricket Ground, Woolloongabba, Brisbane
Umpires: Greg Davidson and Mick Martell
Player of the match: Doug Bollinger (NSW)

- Queensland won the toss and elected to bat.

11 October
09:30
Scorecard

Tasmania; 62 (23.2 overs)	v	Western Australia; 3/64 (15.1 overs)
Jonathan Wells 22 (45); Joel Paris 4/13 (5 overs)		Michael Klinger 28* (40); Sam Rainbird 2/26 (7 overs)

Western Australia won by 7 wickets
Brisbane Cricket Ground, Woolloongabba, Brisbane
Umpires: Michael Graham-Smith and Simon Fry
Player of the match: Joel Paris (WA)

- Western Australia won the toss and elected to field.

12 October
09:30
Scorecard

Queensland; 4/351 (50 overs)	v	South Australia; 257 (45.1 overs)
Joe Burns 115 (115); Shaun Tait 2/62 (8 overs)		Callum Ferguson 98 (91); Peter George 5/39 (8 overs)

Queensland won by 94 runs
Allan Border Field, Brisbane
Umpires: Sam Nogajski and Tony Wilds
Player of the match: Joe Burns (Qld)

- South Australia won the toss and elected to field.

12 October
11:00
Scorecard

Victoria; 293 (50 overs)	v	New South Wales; 5/294 (47.5 overs)
Cameron White 107 (84); Doug Bollinger 4/78 (10 overs)		Moises Henriques 131 (112); John Hastings 1/59 (9.5 overs)

New South Wales won by 5 wickets
North Sydney Oval, Sydney
Umpires: Ashley Barrow and Paul Wilson
Player of the match: Moises Henriques (NSW)

- New South Wales won the toss and elected to field.

13 October
11:00
Scorecard

Western Australia; 8/268 (50 overs)	v	Tasmania; 240 (46.5 overs)
Ashton Agar 64 (60); Evan Gulbis 3/45 (10 overs)		Ed Cowan 76 (79); Joel Paris 3/50 (8.5 overs)

Western Australia won by 28 runs
North Sydney Oval, Sydney
Umpires: Gerard Abood and Damien Mealey
Player of the match: Ashton Agar (WA)

- Tasmania won the toss and elected to field.

14 October
11:00
Scorecard

Queensland; 5/372 (50 overs)	v	Victoria; 256 (43.2 overs)
Chris Hartley 90 (82); Scott Boland 3/70 (10 overs)		Peter Handscomb 72 (61); Ben Cutting 4/63 (9 overs)

Queensland won by 116 runs
North Sydney Oval, Sydney
Umpires: Geoff Joshua and Paul Wilson
Player of the match: Ben Cutting (Qld)

- Victoria won the toss and elected to field.

15 October
10:00
Scorecard

Tasmania; 1/22 (4 overs)	v	South Australia
Tim Paine 14* (12); Gary Putland 1/7 (2 overs)

No result
Bankstown Oval, Sydney
Umpires: Phillip Gillespie and John Ward

- South Australia won the toss and elected to field.
- Match was first reduced to 47 overs per side before being abandoned due to inclement weather and wet outfield

15 October
14:00 (D/N)
Scorecard

New South Wales	v	Western Australia

Match abandoned without a ball bowled
Blacktown Olympic Park Oval, Sydney
Umpires: Gerard Abood and Shawn Craig

17 October
10:00
Scorecard

Victoria; 4/245 (50 overs)	v	New South Wales; 6/243 (50 overs)
David Hussey 58* (38); Gurinder Sandhu 1/41 (10 overs)		Ryan Carters 65 (66); Jon Holland 2/34 (10 overs)

Victoria won by 2 runs
Blacktown Olympic Park Oval, Sydney
Umpires: Damien Mealey and John Ward
Player of the match: David Hussey (Vic)

- Victoria won the toss and elected to bat.

17 October
10:00
Scorecard

South Australia; 215/8 (50 overs)	v	Western Australia; 6/216 (47.5 overs)
Callum Ferguson 82 (82); Nathan Coulter-Nile 4/32 (10 overs)		Adam Voges 55 (80); Gary Putland 3/46 (9 overs)

Western Australia won by 4 wickets
Bankstown Oval, Sydney
Umpires: Phillip Gillespie and Geoff Joshua
Player of the match: Nathan Coulter-Nile (WA)

- Western Australia won the toss and elected to field.

18 October
10:00
Scorecard

Tasmania; 1/398 (50 overs)	v	Queensland; 3/402 (47.2 overs)
Ben Dunk 229* (157); Peter George 1/101 (10 overs)		Usman Khawaja 166 (110); Evan Gulbis 1/72 (9.2 overs)

Queensland won by 7 wickets
North Sydney Oval, Sydney
Umpires: Gerard Abood and Ashley Barrow
Player of the match: Ben Dunk (Tas)

- Queensland won the toss and elected to field.
- Ben Dunk scored the highest score in One-Day Domestic Cricket
- Queensland achieved the highest run chase in One-Day Domestic Cricket

19 October
14:00 (D/N)
Scorecard

Victoria; 213 (48.2 overs)	v	Western Australia; 4/215 (49 overs)
Marcus Stoinis 69 (89); Nathan Coulter-Nile 5/26 (9.2 overs)		Adam Voges 83* (99); Jon Holland 3/39 (10 overs)

Western Australia won by 6 wickets
Blacktown Olympic Park Oval, Sydney
Umpires: Paul Wilson and Shawn Craig
Player of the match: Nathan Coulter-Nile (WA)

- Victoria won the toss and elected to bat.

20 October
14:00 (D/N)
Scorecard

New South Wales; 172 (49.3 overs)	v	Tasmania; 5/173 (29.5 overs)
Ryan Carters 38 (80); Andrew Fekete 3/36 (10 overs)		Tim Paine 69 (66); Gurinder Sandhu 2/44 (8 overs)

Tasmania won by 5 wickets
Blacktown Olympic Park Oval, Sydney
Umpires: Ashley Barrow and Geoff Joshua
Player of the match: Andrew Fekete (Tas)

- New South Wales won the toss and elected to bat

22 October
10:00
Scorecard

South Australia; 295 (49.3 overs)	v	Tasmania; 9/258 (50 overs)
Tom Cooper 72 (69); Kingston, Doherty 3/50 (10 overs)		Ben Dunk 92 (115); Kane Richardson 4/48 (10 overs)

South Australia won by 37 runs
North Sydney Oval, Sydney
Umpires: Greg Davidson and Paul Wilson
Player of the match: Tom Cooper (Tas)

- Tasmania won the toss and elected to field.

22 October
10:00
Scorecard

Queensland; 7/266 (50 overs)	v	Western Australia; 4/265 (50 overs)
Usman Khawaja 120 (129); Nathan Rimmington 4/43 (10 overs)		Craig Simmons 98 (114); James Hopes 1/39 (10 overs)

Queensland won by 1 run
Bankstown Oval, Sydney
Umpires: Shawn Craig and John Ward
Player of the match: Usman Khawaja (Qld)

- Western Australia won the toss and elected to field.

== Finals ==
=== Preliminary final ===
Preliminary Final
24 October
14:00 (D/N)
Scorecard

Queensland; 8/225 (50 overs)	v	New South Wales; 8/229 (49.4 overs)
James Hopes 72 (96); Sean Abbott 3/44 (7 overs)		Peter Nevill 44 (60); Jason Floros 2/27 (6 overs)

New South Wales won by 2 wickets
Blacktown Olympic Park Oval, Sydney
Umpires: Simon Fry (Aus) and Paul Wilson (Aus)
Player of the match: James Hopes (Qld)

- Queensland won the toss and elected to bat

=== Final ===
Final
26 October
14:00 (D/N)
Scorecard

Western Australia; 6/255 (50 overs)	v	New South Wales; 191 (44.1 overs)
Michael Klinger 96 (122); Gurinder Sandhu 2/38 (10 overs)		Shane Watson 83 (100); Jason Behrendorff 5/27 (8.1 overs)

Western Australia won by 64 runs
Sydney Cricket Ground
Umpires: Simon Fry (Aus) and John Ward (Aus)
Player of the match: Michael Klinger (WA)

- Western Australia won the toss and elected to bat
