= List of 2011 Indian Premier League personnel changes =

This is a list of all personnel changes for the 2011 Indian Premier League (IPL).

== Retirement ==
Date	Name	Team(s) played (years)	Age	Notes	Ref.
16 May 2010	Shane Bond	Kolkata Knight Riders (2010)	34		
16 September 2010	Andrew Flintoff	Chennai Super Kings (2009)	32	Had missed the 2010 season due to injury.	
December 2010	Matthew Hayden	Chennai Super Kings (2008–2010)	39	Declined participation in the auction.	
4 January 2011	Anil Kumble	Royal Challengers Bangalore (2008–2010)	40	Became a mentor for the Royal Challengers Bangalore.	
29 January 2011	Nathan Bracken	Royal Challengers Bangalore (2008–2010)	33	Declined participation in the auction.	

== Retained players ==
No	Player	Nat	Salary
Chennai Super Kings
1	Mahendra Singh Dhoni	(India)	$1,800,000
2	Suresh Raina	(India)	$1,300,000
3	Murali Vijay	(India)	$900,000
4	Albie Morkel	(South Africa)	$500,000
Delhi Daredevils
5	Virender Sehwag	(India)	$1,800,000
Mumbai Indians
6	Sachin Tendulkar	(India)	$1,800,000
7	Harbhajan Singh	(India)	$1,300,000
8	Kieron Pollard	(Trinidad and Tobago)	$900,000
9	Lasith Malinga	(Sri Lanka)	$500,000
Rajasthan Royals
10	Shane Warne	(Australia)	$1,800,000
11	Shane Watson	(Australia)	$1,300,000
Royal Challengers Bangalore
12	Virat Kohli	(India)	$1,800,000

== Auction ==
The players auction for the 2011 Indian Premier League (fourth season) was held on 8 and 9 January 2011 at the ITC Royal Gardenia, Bangalore. The auction comprised 350 players (reduced from an initial list of 416 players) put for auction in English auction. Each player in the auction pool had a bidding base price under which franchise owners could not bid. Players were allowed to set their base price between $200,000 to $400,000.

There are reports that some teams spent $12 million on players, despite the salary cap being $9 million.

=== Sold players ===
Player	Team	Winning bid	Base price
Gautam Gambhir	Kolkata Knight Riders	$2,400,000	$200,000
Yusuf Pathan	Kolkata Knight Riders	$2,100,000	$300,000
Robin Uthappa	Pune Warriors India	$2,100,000	$200,000
Rohit Sharma	Mumbai Indians	$2,000,000	$200,000
Irfan Pathan	Delhi Daredevils	$1,900,000	$200,000
Yuvraj Singh	Pune Warriors India	$1,800,000	$400,000
Saurabh Tiwary	Royal Challengers Bangalore	$1,600,000	$100,000
Mahela Jayawardene	Kochi Tuskers Kerala	$1,500,000	$400,000
David Hussey	Kings XI Punjab	$1,400,000	$200,000
Dale Steyn	Deccan Chargers	$1,200,000	$200,000
Muttiah Muralitharan	Kochi Tuskers Kerala	$1,100,000	$300,000
Cameron White	Deccan Chargers	$1,100,000	$300,000
Jacques Kallis	Kolkata Knight Riders	$1,100,000	$300,000
AB de Villiers	Royal Challengers Bangalore	$1,100,000	$400,000
Ross Taylor	Rajasthan Royals	$1,000,000	$400,000
Angelo Mathews	Pune Warriors India	$950,000	$200,000
Ravindra Jadeja	Kochi Tuskers Kerala	$950,000	$100,000
Johan Botha	Rajasthan Royals	$950,000	$200,000
Dinesh Karthik	Kings XI Punjab	$900,000	$200,000
Piyush Chawla	Kings XI Punjab	$900,000	$100,000
Sreesanth	Kochi Tuskers Kerala	$900,000	$200,000
Adam Gilchrist	Kings XI Punjab	$900,000	$400,000
Zaheer Khan	Royal Challengers Bangalore	$900,000	$300,000
Dan Christian	Deccan Chargers	$900,000	$50,000
Ravichandran Ashwin	Chennai Super Kings	$850,000	$100,000
Ashish Nehra	Pune Warriors India	$850,000	$200,000
Andrew Symonds	Mumbai Indians	$850,000	$300,000
Subramaniam Badrinath	Chennai Super Kings	$800,000	$100,000
Praveen Kumar	Kings XI Punjab	$800,000	$200,000
Abhishek Nayar	Kings XI Punjab	$800,000	$50,000
David Warner	Delhi Daredevils	$750,000	$200,000
Umesh Yadav	Delhi Daredevils	$750,000	$50,000
Munaf Patel	Mumbai Indians	$700,000	$100,000
Venugopal Rao	Delhi Daredevils	$700,000	$100,000
Kumar Sangakkara	Deccan Chargers	$700,000	$300,000
Cheteshwar Pujara	Royal Challengers Bangalore	$700,000	$100,000
Doug Bollinger	Chennai Super Kings	$700,000	$200,000
Dirk Nannes	Royal Challengers Bangalore	$650,000	$200,000
Tillakaratne Dilshan	Royal Challengers Bangalore	$650,000	$400,000
Kevin Pietersen	Deccan Chargers	$650,000	$400,000
Daniel Vettori	Royal Challengers Bangalore	$550,000	$400,000
Pragyan Ojha	Deccan Chargers	$500,000	$200,000
Rahul Dravid	Rajasthan Royals	$500,000	$400,000
Graeme Smith	Pune Warriors India	$500,000	$400,000
RP Singh	Kochi Tuskers Kerala	$500,000	$200,000
Lakshmipathy Balaji	Kolkata Knight Riders	$500,000	$100,000
Manoj Tiwari	Kolkata Knight Riders	$475,000	$100,000
Morné Morkel	Delhi Daredevils	$475,000	$100,000
Brendon McCullum	Kochi Tuskers Kerala	$475,000	$400,000
Vinay Kumar	Kochi Tuskers Kerala	$475,000	$100,000
Ishant Sharma	Deccan Chargers	$450,000	$200,000
Brad Hodge	Kochi Tuskers Kerala	$425,000	$200,000
Shakib Al Hasan	Kolkata Knight Riders	$425,000	$200,000
Michael Hussey	Chennai Super Kings	$425,000	$200,000
Brett Lee	Kolkata Knight Riders	$400,000	$400,000
Shaun Marsh	Kings XI Punjab	$400,000	$400,000
Stuart Broad	Kings XI Punjab	$400,000	$400,000
VVS Laxman	Kochi Tuskers Kerala	$400,000	$300,000
Murali Kartik	Pune Warriors India	$400,000	$200,000
Ashok Dinda	Delhi Daredevils	$375,000	$100,000
Eoin Morgan	Kolkata Knight Riders	$350,000	$200,000
James Hopes	Delhi Daredevils	$350,000	$200,000
Ryan Harris	Kings XI Punjab	$325,000	$200,000
Brad Haddin	Kolkata Knight Riders	$325,000	$200,000
Callum Ferguson	Pune Warriors India	$300,000	$200,000
Aaron Finch	Delhi Daredevils	$300,000	$100,000
Amit Mishra	Deccan Chargers	$300,000	$100,000
Shikhar Dhawan	Deccan Chargers	$300,000	$100,000
JP Duminy	Deccan Chargers	$300,000	$200,000
Shaun Tait	Rajasthan Royals	$300,000	$300,000
Parthiv Patel	Kochi Tuskers Kerala	$290,000	$100,000
Mitchell Marsh	Pune Warriors India	$290,000	$100,000
Manpreet Gony	Deccan Chargers	$290,000	$50,000
Naman Ojha	Delhi Daredevils	$270,000	$100,000
Tim Paine	Pune Warriors India	$270,000	$100,000
Abhimanyu Mithun	Royal Challengers Bangalore	$260,000	$100,000
Jaydev Unadkat	Kolkata Knight Riders	$250,000	$50,000
Paul Collingwood	Rajasthan Royals	$250,000	$200,000
Sudeep Tyagi	Chennai Super Kings	$240,000	$50,000
Ajit Agarkar	Delhi Daredevils	$210,000	$100,000
Steve Smith	Pune Warriors India	$200,000	$200,000
Dwayne Bravo	Chennai Super Kings	$200,000	$200,000
Owais Shah	Kochi Tuskers Kerala	$200,000	$200,000
Scott Styris	Chennai Super Kings	$200,000	$100,000
Davy Jacobs	Mumbai Indians	$190,000	$20,000
Ramesh Powar	Kochi Tuskers Kerala	$180,000	$100,000
Wayne Parnell	Pune Warriors India	$160,000	$100,000
Ryan ten Doeschate	Kolkata Knight Riders	$150,000	$50,000
Jesse Ryder	Pune Warriors India	$150,000	$100,000
Joginder Sharma	Chennai Super Kings	$150,000	$100,000
Charl Langeveldt	Royal Challengers Bangalore	$140,000	$100,000
Mohammad Kaif	Royal Challengers Bangalore	$130,000	$100,000
Francois du Plessis	Chennai Super Kings	$120,000	$20,000
Clint McKay	Mumbai Indians	$110,000	$100,000
Nathan McCullum	Pune Warriors India	$100,000	$100,000
James Franklin	Mumbai Indians	$100,000	$100,000
Wriddhiman Saha	Chennai Super Kings	$100,000	$100,000
Jerome Taylor	Pune Warriors India	$100,000	$100,000
James Pattinson	Kolkata Knight Riders	$100,000	$100,000
Alfonso Thomas	Pune Warriors India	$100,000	$50,000
Nuwan Kulasekara	Chennai Super Kings	$100,000	$100,000
Matthew Wade	Delhi Daredevils	$100,000	$100,000
Dimitri Mascarenhas	Kings XI Punjab	$100,000	$100,000
Colin Ingram	Delhi Daredevils	$100,000	$100,000
Ben Hilfenhaus	Chennai Super Kings	$100,000	$100,000
Pankaj Singh	Rajasthan Royals	$95,000	$50,000
Rusty Theron	Deccan Chargers	$85,000	$50,000
Suraj Randiv	Chennai Super Kings	$80,000	$50,000
John Hastings	Kochi Tuskers Kerala	$20,000	$20,000
Andrew McDonald	Delhi Daredevils	$80,000	$50,000
Thissara Perera	Kochi Tuskers Kerala	$80,000	$50,000
Michael Lumb	Deccan Chargers	$80,000	$50,000
Michael Klinger	Kochi Tuskers Kerala	$75,000	$20,000
Johan van der Wath	Royal Challengers Bangalore	$50,000	$50,000
Moises Henriques	Mumbai Indians	$50,000	$50,000
George Bailey	Chennai Super Kings	$50,000	$50,000
Roelof van der Merwe	Delhi Daredevils	$50,000	$50,000
Luke Pomersbach	Royal Challengers Bangalore	$50,000	$20,000
Rilee Rossouw	Royal Challengers Bangalore	$20,000	$20,000
Nuwan Pradeep	Royal Challengers Bangalore	$20,000	$20,000
Chris Lynn	Deccan Chargers	$20,000	$20,000
Travis Birt	Delhi Daredevils	$20,000	$20,000
Nathan Rimmington	Kings XI Punjab	$20,000	$20,000
Jonathan Vandiar	Royal Challengers Bangalore	$20,000	$20,000
Aiden Blizzard	Mumbai Indians	$20,000	$20,000
Robert Frylinck	Delhi Daredevils	$20,000	$20,000
Stephen O'Keefe	Kochi Tuskers Kerala	$20,000	$20,000

== Replacement signings ==
Many franchises signed players after the IPL auction, as replacement of contracted players who were not available to play due to injuries and national commitments. Under IPL rules, the replacements had to be chosen from the pool of players who went unsold in the January auction, and could not be paid more than the players they were replacing, though they could be paid less.

Player	Replaced	Team	Price	Reason for replacement
Tim Southee	Ben Hilfenhaus	Chennai Super Kings	$100,000	Injury
Chris Gayle	Dirk Nannes	Royal Challengers Bangalore	$650,000	Injury – side strain
Jacob Oram	Paul Collingwood	Rajasthan Royals	$250,000	Injury – damaged cartilage in right knee
Ryan McLaren	Stuart Broad	Kings XI Punjab	$250,000	Injury – side strain
David Miller	Dimitri Mascarenhas	Kings XI Punjab	$100,000	Surgery – to fix achilles heel injury
Mark Boucher	Brad Haddin	Kolkata Knight Riders	$325,000	Injury – middle finger
Sourav Ganguly	Ashish Nehra	Pune Warriors India	$400,000	Injury – finger
James Faulkner	Angelo Mathews	Pune Warriors India	$100,000	Injury – leg
Ray Price	Moises Henriques	Mumbai Indians	$50,000	Injury – adductor muscle
Dilhara Fernando	Clint McKay	Mumbai Indians	$100,000	Injury – stress fracture in left foot

== See also ==
- List of 2010 Indian Premier League personnel changes
- 2011 Indian Premier League
