= 2013–14 Ryobi One-Day Cup =

2013 Ryobi One-Day Cup
- Dates: 29 September 2013 – 27 October 2013
- Administrator: Cricket Australia
- Cricket format: List A
- Tournament format: Round-robin tournament
- Host: Sydney
- Champions: Queensland (10th title)
- Participants: 6
- Matches: 20
- Player of the series: Cameron White (Victoria)
- Most runs: David Warner (NSW) (541)
- Most wickets: Sean Abbott (NSW) (16)

The 2013 Ryobi One-Day Cup was the 44th season of the official List A domestic cricket in Australia. It was played in a four-week period at the start of the domestic season to separate its schedule from the Sheffield Shield, held after this tournament's conclusion. It was held exclusively in Sydney and most matches were broadcast live on free-to-air television on GEM.

== Points table ==
Pos	Team	Pld	W	L	T	NR	BP	Pts	NRR
1	Queensland	6	5	1	0	0	2	22	0.935
2	New South Wales	6	4	2	0	0	1	17	0.372
3	Victoria*	6	4	2	0	0	0	15.5	0.263
4	Tasmania	6	3	3	0	0	0	12	−0.493
5	Western Australia	6	1	5	0	0	0	4	−0.506
6	South Australia	6	1	5	0	0	0	4	−0.516

- Victoria deducted 0.5 of a point for a slow-over rate in the match against Queensland.

== Group stage ==
29 September
09:30
Scorecard

(H) New South Wales; 9/178 (50 overs)	v	Tasmania; 97 (35 overs)
Steve Smith 70 (99); Ben Laughlin 3/23 (10 overs)		Ed Cowan 25 (50); Moises Henriques 4/17 (8 overs)

New South Wales won by 81 runs
Bankstown Oval, Sydney
Umpires: Simon Fry and Geoff Joshua
Player of the match: Steve Smith (New South Wales)

- New South Wales won the toss and chose to bat.
- List A debuts: Kurtis Patterson (New South Wales) and Sam Rainbird (Tasmania)
- Points: New South Wales 5, Tasmania 0

1 October
09:30
Scorecard

Tasmania; 197 (48.2 overs)	v	Victoria; 5/199 (44.5 overs)
Ed Cowan 60 (88); Fawad Ahmed 4/38 (8.2 overs)		Rob Quiney 49 (59); Xavier Doherty 1/30 (10 overs)

Victoria won by 5 wickets
Bankstown Oval, Sydney
Umpires: Gerard Abood and Geoff Joshua
Player of the match: Fawad Ahmed (Victoria)

- Tasmania won the toss and elected to bat
- Points: Victoria 4, Tasmania 0

4 October
09:30
Scorecard

South Australia; 6/232 (50 overs)	v	Victoria; 4/236 (47.5 overs)
Sam Miller 47* (67); Daniel Christian 2/41 (10 overs)		Cameron White 86 (89); Brenton McDonald 2/47 (7.5 overs)

Victoria won by 6 wickets
Bankstown Oval, Sydney
Umpires: Simon Fry and Michael Graham-Smith
Player of the match: Cameron White (Victoria)

- South Australia won the toss and elected to bat.
- List A debuts: Brenton McDonald and Sam Miller (South Australia)
- Points: Victoria 4, South Australia 0

7 October
10:00
Scorecard

(H) New South Wales; 9/171 (50 overs)	v	Victoria; 8/174 (45.5 overs)
Ben Rohrer 63* (91); Scott Boland 3/42 (10 overs)		Cameron White 82* (126); Doug Bollinger 2/25 (10 overs)

Victoria won by 2 wickets
Bankstown Oval, Sydney
Umpires: Sam Nogajski and Tony Ward
Player of the match: Cameron White (Victoria)

- New South Wales won the toss and elected to bat.
- Points: Victoria 4, New South Wales 0

9 October
10:00
Scorecard

South Australia; 6/268 (50 overs)	v	Tasmania; 8/269 (49.5 overs)
Michael Klinger 140* (153); Clive Rose 2/33 (10 overs)		Alex Doolan 68 (66); Joe Mennie 2/52 (10 overs)

Tasmania won by 2 wickets
Bankstown Oval, Sydney
Umpires: John Ward and TG Ward
Player of the match: Michael Klinger (South Australia)

- South Australia won the toss and elected to bat.
- Points: Tasmania 4, South Australia 0

11 October
10:00
Scorecard

Queensland; 4/202 (50 overs)	v	Western Australia; 118 (42.5 overs)
Nathan Reardon 92* (110); Andrew Tye 2/32 (8 overs)		Marcus North 33 (86); Jason Floros 3/37 (8 overs)

Queensland won by 84 runs
Bankstown Oval, Sydney
Umpires: Sam Nogajski and John Ward
Player of the match: Nathan Reardon (Queensland)

- Queensland won the toss and elected to bat.
- List A debuts: Andrew Tye (Western Australia)
- Points: Queensland 5, Western Australia 0

12 October
10:00
Scorecard

South Australia; 210 (50 overs)	v	Tasmania; 9/211 (49.5 overs)
Michael Klinger 74 (108); Andrew Fekete 4/38 (10 overs)		Tim Paine 56 (78); Peter George 3/27 (10 overs)

Tasmania won by 1 wicket
Bankstown Oval, Sydney
Umpires: Mick Martell and Paul Wilson
Player of the match: Andrew Fekete (Tasmania)

- South Australia won the toss and elected to bat.
- List A debuts: Matthew Weaver (South Australia)
- Points: Tasmania 4, South Australia 0

13 October
10:00
Scorecard

Queensland; 8/305 (50 overs)	v	Victoria; 279 (48.1 overs)
Ben Cutting 98* (48); Peter Siddle 3/43 (10 overs)		Rob Quiney 59 (62); Luke Feldman 5/57 (9 overs)

Queensland won by 26 runs
North Sydney Oval, Sydney
Umpires: Ashley Barrow and Sam Nogajski
Player of the match: Ben Cutting (Queensland)

- Victoria won the toss and elected to field.
- Points: Queensland 4, Victoria -0.5
- Victoria were deducted 0.5 points for slow over-rate.

13 October
10:00
Scorecard

Western Australia; 8/233 (50 overs)	v	New South Wales (H); 5/234 (48.5 overs)
Marcus North 51 (59); Gurinder Sandhu 3/66 (10 overs)		Steve Smith 73* (108); Michael Beer 1/31 (10 overs)

New South Wales won by 5 wickets
Hurstville Oval, Sydney
Umpires: Damien Mealey and Tony Ward
Player of the match: Sean Abbott (New South Wales)

- Western Australia won the toss and elected to bat.
- Points: New South Wales 4, Western Australia 0

15 October
10:00
Scorecard

Queensland; 9/241 (50 overs)	v	Tasmania; 8/245 (49.1 overs)
Usman Khawaja 66 (88); Evan Gulbis 4/36 (10 overs)		Jordan Silk 62 (75); Michael Neser 4/50 (10 overs)

Tasmania won by 2 wickets
Hurstville Oval, Sydney
Umpires: Ashley Barrow and Ian Lock
Player of the match: Evan Gulbis (Tasmania)

- Tasmania won the toss and elected to field
- Points: Tasmania 4, Queensland 0

15 October
10:00
Scorecard

Victoria; 8/331 (50 overs)	v	Western Australia; 272 (47 overs)
Cameron White 76 (49); Jason Behrendorff 3/66 (10 overs)		Simon Katich 67 (58); Jon Holland 4/48 (10 overs)

Victoria won by 59 runs
North Sydney Oval, Sydney
Umpires: Damien Mealey and Paul Wilson

- Western Australia won the toss and elected to field.
- Points: Victoria 4, Western Australia 0

17 October
10:00
Scorecard

(H) New South Wales; 253 (43.2 overs)	v	Queensland; 5/256 (44 overs)
David Warner 139 (126); James Hopes 4/38 (7.2 overs)		Chris Lynn 78* (67); Nathan Lyon 2/33 (10 overs)

Queensland won by 5 wickets
North Sydney Oval, Sydney
Umpires: Ashley Barrow and Damien Mealey
Player of the match: James Hopes (Queensland)

- New South Wales won the toss and elected to bat.
- Points: Queensland 4, New South Wales 0

17 October
10:00
Scorecard

Western Australia; 5/285 (50 overs)	v	South Australia; 4/286 (48.3 overs)
Simon Katich 66 (39); Peter George 2/41 (10 overs)		Tom Cooper 101 (131); Nathan Rimmington 2/50 (9.3 overs)

South Australia won by 6 wickets
Drummoyne Oval, Sydney
Umpires: Ian Lock and Mick Martell
Player of the match: Tom Cooper (South Australia)

- Western Australia won the toss and elected to bat.
- Points: South Australia 4, Western Australia 0

19 October
10:00
Scorecard

Queensland; 8/273 (50 overs)	v	South Australia; 183 (34.4 overs)
James Peirson 85 (102); Johan Botha 3/42 (10 overs)		Adam Zampa 66 (51); Nathan Hauritz 3/31 (5.4 overs)

Queensland won by 90 runs
North Sydney Oval, Sydney
Umpires: Gerard Abood and Michael Graham-Smith

- South Australia won the toss and elected to field.
- List A debuts: James Peirson (Queensland)
- Points: Queensland 5, South Australia 0

19 October
10:00
Scorecard

Western Australia; 8/256 (50 overs)	v	Tasmania; 204 (48.5 overs)
Shaun Marsh 84 (92); Evan Gulbis 3/37 (10 overs)		Evan Gulbis 47 (46); Andrew Tye 5/46 (9.5 overs)

Western Australia won by 52 runs
Blacktown Olympic Park Oval, Sydney
Umpires: Greg Davidson and Mick Martell
Player of the match: Shaun Marsh (Western Australia)

- Tasmania won the toss and elected to field.
- Points: Western Australia 4, Tasmania 0

20 October
10:00
Scorecard

Victoria; 311 (50 overs)	v	New South Wales; 3/314 (45.5 overs)
Matthew Wade 85 (81); Josh Hazlewood 4/57 (10 overs)		David Warner 138 (111); Peter Siddle 1/48 (7 overs)

New South Wales won by 7 wickets
North Sydney Oval, Sydney
Umpires: Ian Lock and Paul Wilson
Player of the match: David Warner (New South Wales)

- New South Wales won the toss and elected to field.
- Points: New South Wales 4, Victoria 0

22 October
10:00
Scorecard

Western Australia; 9/212 (46 overs)	v	Queensland; 3/145 (29.5 overs)
Shaun Marsh 119 (129); Matthew Gale 2/36 (9 overs)		Usman Khawaja 88* (95); Andrew Tye 2/36 (7 overs)

Queensland won by 35 runs (D/L)
North Sydney Oval, Sydney
Umpires: Simon Fry and Paul Wilson
Player of the match: Usman Khawaja (Queensland)

- Queensland won the toss and elected to field.
- Points: Queensland 4, Western Australia 0

22 October
14:15
Scorecard

(H) New South Wales; 8/252 (42 overs)	v	South Australia; 198 (34.5 overs)
Nic Maddinson 75 (74); Joe Mennie 4/58 (8 overs)		Tom Cooper 73 (62); Sean Abbott 3/32 (6 overs)

New South Wales won by 49 runs (D/L)
Drummoyne Oval, Sydney
Umpires: Michael Graham-Smith and John Ward
Player of the match: Sean Abbott (New South Wales)

- New South Wales won the toss and elected to bat.
- Points: New South Wales 4, South Australia 0

== Finals ==
Semi-final
24 October
10:00
Scorecard

Victoria; 9/321 (50 overs)	v	New South Wales (H); 6/324 (49.3 overs)
Daniel Christian 117 (90); Sean Abbott 3/52 (10 overs)		David Warner 197 (141); Fawad Ahmed 2/64 (9.3 overs)

New South Wales won by 4 wickets
North Sydney Oval, Sydney
Umpires: Gerard Abood and Geoff Joshua
Player of the match: David Warner

- Victoria won the toss and elected to bat.
- David Warner's 197 was the highest List A score in Australia at the time.

Final
27 October
Scorecard

(H) New South Wales; 6/317 (50 overs)	v	Queensland; 5/319 (49.1 overs)
Nic Maddinson 76 (74); James Hopes 3/64 (10 overs)		Usman Khawaja 104 (100); Doug Bollinger 2/53 (10 overs)

Queensland won by 5 wickets
North Sydney Oval, Sydney
Umpires: Simon Fry and John Ward
Player of the match: Usman Khawaja

- Queensland won the toss and elected to field.
- Queensland won the 2013 Ryobi One-Day Cup
