= Australian cricket team in India in 2010–11 =

	India	Australia
- Dates: 1 October 2010 – 24 October 2010
Captains	Mahendra Singh Dhoni	Ricky Ponting (Tests); Michael Clarke (ODIs)

Test series
- Result: India won the 2-match series 2–0
Most runs	Sachin Tendulkar (403)	Shane Watson (271)
Most wickets	Zaheer Khan (12)	Mitchell Johnson (8)
- Player of the series: Sachin Tendulkar (Ind)

One Day International series
- Results: India won the 3-match series 1–0
Most runs	Virat Kohli (118)	Michael Clarke (111)
Most wickets	Clint McKay (3)	Ashish Nehra (2)
- Player of the series: Virat Kohli (Ind)

The Australian cricket team toured India, played three One Day Internationals and two Test matches between 1 and 24 October 2010.

== Squads ==
Test squads		ODI squads	
India	Australia	India	Australia
Mahendra Singh Dhoni (c, wk); Suresh Raina (vc); Rahul Dravid; Gautam Gambhir; Zaheer Khan; VVS Laxman; Amit Mishra; Pragyan Ojha; Cheteshwar Pujara; Virender Sehwag; Ishant Sharma; Harbhajan Singh; Sreesanth; Sachin Tendulkar; Murali Vijay	Ricky Ponting (c); Michael Clarke (vc); Doug Bollinger; Peter George; Nathan Hauritz; Josh Hazlewood; Ben Hilfenhaus; Phillip Hughes; Michael Hussey; Mitchell Johnson; Simon Katich; Marcus North; Tim Paine (wk); Steve Smith; Shane Watson	Mahendra Singh Dhoni (c, wk); Suresh Raina (vc); Ravichandran Ashwin; Shikhar Dhawan; Ravindra Jadeja; Virat Kohli; Praveen Kumar; Vinay Kumar; Ashish Nehra; Munaf Patel; Rohit Sharma; Yuvraj Singh; Saurabh Tiwary; Murali Vijay	Michael Clarke (c); Cameron White (vc); Doug Bollinger; Callum Ferguson; Nathan Hauritz; James Hopes; Michael Hussey; Clint McKay; Shaun Marsh; Tim Paine (wk); James Pattinson; Steve Smith; Mitchell Starc; David Warner

== Tour Match ==
25–27 September
Scorecard

Australians	v	Indian Board President's XI
505/8d (144.3 overs); Marcus North 124 (128); Pragyan Ojha 3/67 (33.3 overs)		177 (45.5 overs); Piyush Chawla 82 (102); Ben Hilfenhaus 5/47 (12 overs)
187/6d (41 overs); Shane Watson 104* (121); Piyush Chawla 3/64 (15 overs)		174/0 (36 overs); Ajinkya Rahane 113* (111); Ben Hilfenhaus 0/24 (6 overs)

Match drawn
Sector 16 Stadium, Chandigarh
Umpires: Sudhir Asnani (Ind) and Sanjay Hazare (Ind)

- Australians won the toss and elected to bat.

== Test series ==
=== 1st Test ===
1–5 October
Scorecard

Australia	v	India
428 (151.4 overs); Shane Watson 126 (338); Zaheer Khan 5/94 (30 overs)		405 (108.1 overs); Sachin Tendulkar 98 (189); Mitchell Johnson 5/64 (20 overs)
192 (60.5 overs); Shane Watson 56 (59); Ishant Sharma 3/34 (9 overs)		216/9 (58.4 overs); VVS Laxman 73* (79); Ben Hilfenhaus 4/57 (19 overs)

India won by 1 wicket
PCA Stadium, Mohali, Chandigarh
Umpires: Billy Bowden (NZ) and Ian Gould (Eng)
Player of the match: Zaheer Khan (Ind)

- Australia won the toss and elected to bat.
- This was the first occasion ever where India won a Test match by 1 wicket

Australia batted first and with the century from Shane Watson makes a score of 428 runs. Zaheer Khan took five wickets . In reply India put 405 runs on the board giving the Aussies a lead of 23 runs. Australian second innings was reduced to 192 runs by good performance by all Indian bowlers. The target for India was 216 and it was not an easy task for Indian batsmen as Aussie bowlers troubled Indian batsmen with their pace attack and took quick wickets.

It was a perfectly scripted game for the Aussies. India had ended day 4 at 55 for 4 and they still needed 161 runs for a victory. The Australian pacers started afresh on the final day and India lost another four wickets for 48 runs. First Ishant Sharma shared a partnership of 81 runs with Laxman for the ninth wicket before Pragyan Ojha and Laxman completed one of the greatest comebacks in cricket. The duo added the required 11 runs and helped India win the match by one wicket.

=== 2nd Test ===
9–13 October
Scorecard

Australia	v	India
478 (141 overs); Marcus North 128 (240); Harbhajan Singh 4/148 (43 overs)		495 (144.5 overs); Sachin Tendulkar 214 (363); Mitchell Johnson 3/105 (28 overs)
223 (75.2 overs); Ricky Ponting 72 (117); Zaheer Khan 3/41 (11.2 overs)		207/3 (45 overs); Cheteshwar Pujara 72 (89); Shane Watson 1/20 (5 overs)

India won by 7 wickets
M. Chinnaswamy Stadium, Bangalore
Umpires: Billy Bowden (NZ) and Ian Gould (Eng)
Player of the match: Sachin Tendulkar (Ind)

- Australia won the toss and elected to bat.
- Bad light ended play early on day 1
- The tenth time in a row India lost the toss (the most by any team)
- During the first innings, Ricky Ponting became the highest Australian run scorer in Test matches against India
- Sachin Tendulkar went past 14,000 runs in this Test match
- Test debuts: Cheteshwar Pujara (Ind) and Peter George (Aus)

== ODI series ==
=== 1st ODI ===
17 October 2010
Scorecard

Australia	v	India

Match abandoned without a ball bowled
Nehru Stadium, Kochi
Umpires: Billy Bowden (NZ) and Amiesh Saheba (Ind)

=== 2nd ODI ===
20 October 2010
Scorecard

Australia; 289/3 (50 overs)	v	India; 292/5 (48.5 overs)
Michael Clarke 111* (139); Ashish Nehra 2/57 (10 overs)		Virat Kohli 118 (121); Clint McKay 3/55 (10 overs)

India won by 5 wickets
Dr. Y.S. Rajashekhara Reddy ACA-VDCA Cricket Stadium, Visakhapatnam
Umpires: Billy Bowden (NZ) and Shavir Tarapore (Ind)
Player of the match: Virat Kohli (Ind)

- India won the toss and elected to field.
- ODI debuts: Saurabh Tiwary and Shikhar Dhawan (Ind); John Hastings and Mitchell Starc (Aus).

|India own the toss and they invite Australia to bat first. Australia lost both the openers at an early stage but the century run partnership between Michael Hussey and Michael Clarke puts the things under control for Aussies. They steadied Australia with a 144-run stand and Michael Hussey(69r,77 b) was dismissed after scoring a half century. Then comes the Cameron White joins Michael Clarke(111 r, 139 b,7×4's,1×6) in the middle keeps increasing the score card with boundaries as he scores 89 runs off just 49 balls with six fours and six sixes. Clarke scores his fifth century of his career. White left India facing a tough target. Last five overs cost India 84 runs. |India was set a target of 290 runs. |India lost both their openers in quick time and were dismissed by Clint McKay. Then Virat Kohli (118r,121b,11×4's,1×6's) and Yuvraj Singh(58r,87b) stabilizes the India's innings with their 137 run stand. Later Yuvraj Singh was dismissed and brings Suresh Raina to join with Kohli and they both add some quick runs. Virat Kohli scores to his third century and change gears scoring some quick runs in the middle and was dismissed. Suresh Raina then finished the remaining things with debutant Saurabh Tiwary and takes India to victory of five wickets.

=== 3rd ODI ===
24 October 2010
Scorecard

Australia	v	India

Match abandoned without a ball bowled
Nehru Stadium, Fatorda, Margao
Umpires: Billy Bowden (NZ) and Amiesh Saheba (Ind)

== Media coverage ==
=== Television ===
- India: NEO Cricket
- India: Doordarshan (only ODI matches)
- Australia: Fox Sports
- United Kingdom and Ireland: Sky Sports
- South Africa, Kenya and Zimbabwe: SuperSport
- Canada: ATN CBN
- United Arab Emirates: Arab Digital Distribution
