= Trent Copeland =

Australian cricketer

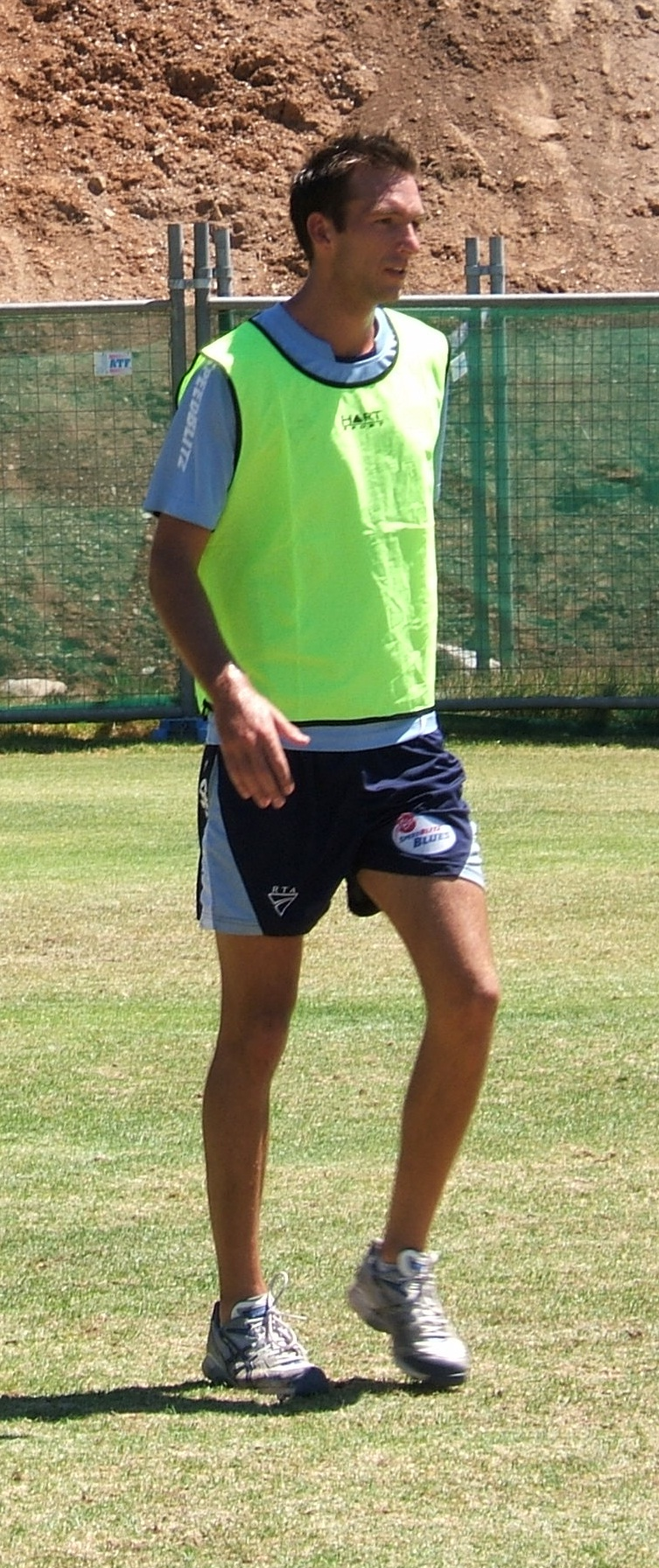
- Copeland in 2010

Personal information
- Full name: Trent Aaron Copeland
- Born: 14 March 1986 (age 40); Bathurst, New South Wales, Australia
- Nickname: Copes
- Height: 1.95 m (6 ft 5 in)
- Batting: Right-handed
- Bowling: Right-arm fast-medium
- Role: Bowler
- Relatives: Kimberlee Green (wife)

International information
- National side: Australia (2011)
- Test debut (cap 420): 31 August 2011 v Sri Lanka
- Last Test: 16 September 2011 v Sri Lanka

Domestic team information
- Years: Team
- 2009/10–2023: New South Wales
- 2011/12: Sydney Thunder
- 2013: Northamptonshire
- 2013/14: Sydney Sixers (squad no. 9)

Career statistics
Competition	Test	FC	LA	T20
Matches	3	111	29	3
Runs scored	39	2,142	111	1
Batting average	13.00	16.73	12.33	1.00
100s/50s	0/0	1/8	0/0	0/0
Top score	23*	106	23	1
Balls bowled	648	25,420	1,489	30
Wickets	6	407	41	0
Bowling average	37.83	25.68	31.29	–
5 wickets in innings	0	21	2	–
10 wickets in match	0	3	0	–
Best bowling	2/24	8/92	5/32	–
Catches/stumpings	2/-	110/–	8/–	0/–
- Source: Cricinfo, 4 October 2021

Trent Aaron Copeland (born 14 March 1986) is an Australian cricket player and commentator. He was a right-arm fast bowler who played first-class cricket for New South Wales. He made his Test debut for Australia against Sri Lanka in August 2011.

== Cricket ==
Originally from Bathurst, Trent Copeland began his career as a wicketkeeper at St George Cricket Club. In a third grade game, with the front-line bowlers exhausted, St George turned to Copeland needing 4 wickets for a win, with the close of play 10 minutes away. Copeland took 4/1 from 2 overs. Following this performance, Copeland quickly came up through the ranks of St George, and was the second highest wicket-taker with 61 at 16.62 in the Sydney Grade competition in 2008–09.

He made his first class debut for NSW against Queensland at the Sydney Cricket Ground on 27 January 2010 and took a remarkable 8/92 in the first innings. It was the second-best figures in a maiden first-class fixture for New South Wales. Copeland took an impressive 35 wickets at 17.57 in a remarkable, debut Sheffield Shield season. Despite playing just 5 games he was the third highest wicket taker behind only Ben Cutting and Peter George who both played the full 10 games – twice as many as Copeland. He was named in the ACA four-day team of the year two seasons in a row 2009/10 and 2010/11. Copeland replaced Doug Bollinger in the Sydney Thunder Big Bash squad, and his stocks continued to rise.

Copeland won the Allan Border Medal – Bradman Young Cricketer of the Year 2010. He was named in the Australia A four-day and one-day squads to tour Zimbabwe in July 2011, and was subsequently named in the Test squad to tour Sri Lanka in August 2011.

Copeland made his Test debut for Australia in Galle, Sri Lanka, he had his baggy Green cap presented to him by Doug Walters. He picked up the wicket of Sri Lankan opener Tillakaratne Dilshan, whose wicket he would claim twice more in 5 innings. He scored a vital 23* in the second innings of his debut Test, achieving the fourth-highest score in the innings. He took 6 wickets at an economical run return, retained his place in the squad for tour of South Africa two months later but Ryan Harris was selected to play ahead of him in the first test and the 18 year old Pat Cummins made his test debut in the second test as Harris was injured. Copeland was the 12th man and occasionally fielded as the substitute. This was his last involvement in an Australian national team as he was not included in any squad for the Australian summer of 2011/10 as the selectors picked James Pattinson and Mitchell Starc to debut alongside Peter Siddle & Nathan Lyon in the bowling attack with Ben Cutting in the squad but not playing. Copeland did not make any appearances for Australia in the 20 or 50 over short formats.

In 2018, Copeland joined the Seven Network as an analyst for the network's Test cricket coverage, after having previously done radio commentary with ABC Radio Grandstand.

Copeland hosted 7Mate's coverage of the 2020 Tokyo Olympics.

As of January 2025, Copeland is general manager of the Sydney Thunder.

== Personal life ==
Copeland is married to former Australian Diamonds netballer, Kimberlee Green.

During his early years in Sydney, Copeland studied sports management at the Australian College of Physical Education and, later, did a master's degree in International Sports Management at Southern Cross University.
