= Michael Klinger =

Australian cricketer (born 1980)

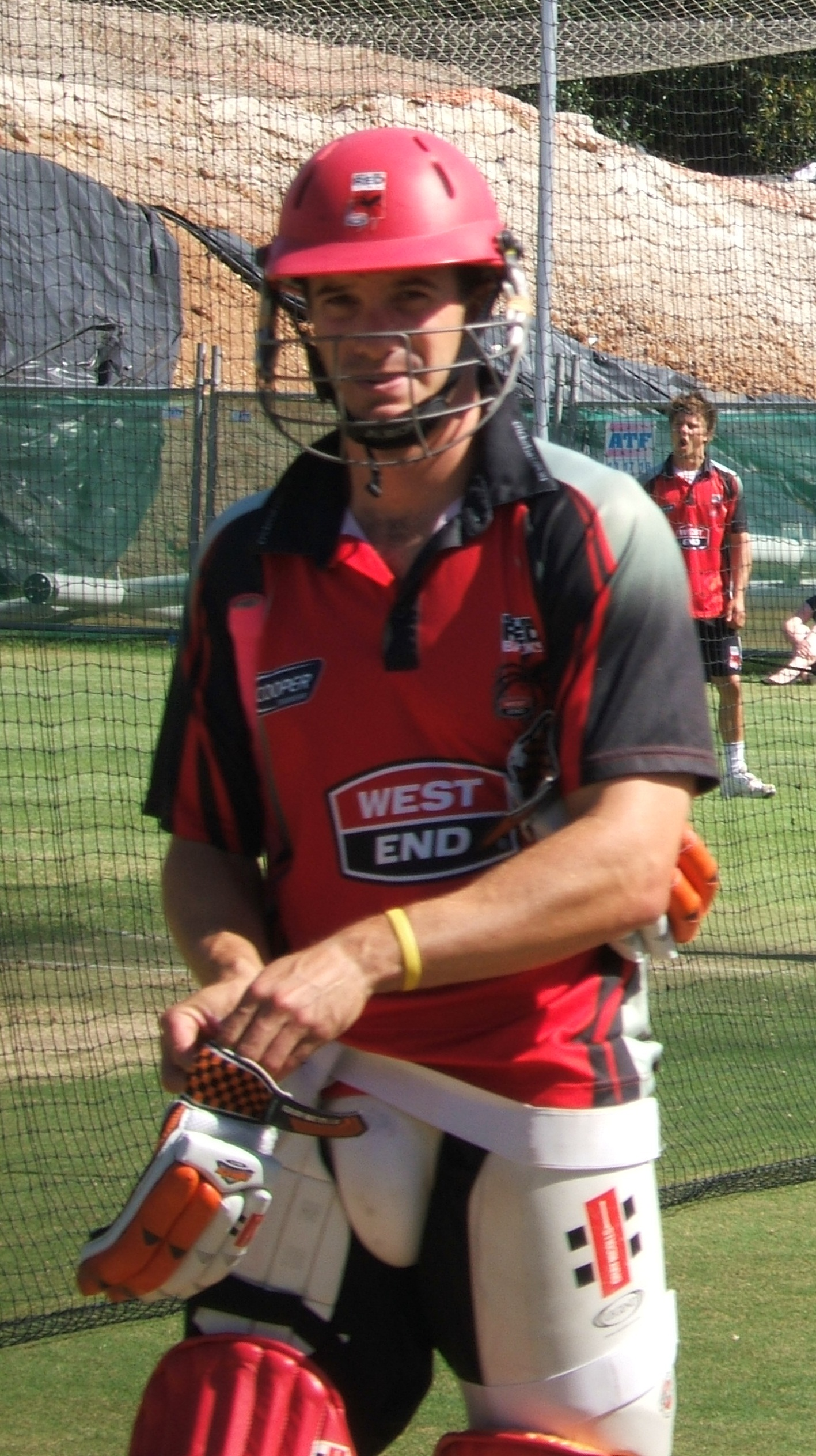
- Klinger in February 2010

Personal information
- Full name: Michael Klinger
- Born: 4 July 1980 (age 46); Kew, Victoria, Australia
- Nickname: Maxy
- Height: 1.79 m (5 ft 10 in)
- Batting: Right-handed
- Role: Batter

International information
- National side: Australia
- T20I debut (cap 84): 17 February 2017 v Sri Lanka
- Last T20I: 22 February 2017 v Sri Lanka
- T20I shirt no.: 52

Domestic team information
- Years: Team
- 1999/00–2007/08: Victoria
- 2008/09–2013/14: South Australia
- 2011: Kochi Tuskers Kerala
- 2011/12–2013/14: Adelaide Strikers (squad no. 18)
- 2012: Worcestershire (squad no. 2)
- 2013–2019: Gloucestershire (squad no. 2)
- 2014/15–2017/18: Western Australia (squad no. 7)
- 2014/15–2018/19: Perth Scorchers (squad no. 7)
- 2017: Khulna Titans

Career statistics
Competition	T20I	FC	LA	T20
Matches	3	182	177	206
Runs scored	143	11,320	7,449	5,960
Batting average	47.66	39.30	49.33	34.45
100s/50s	0/1	30/49	18/44	8/33
Top score	62	255	166*	126*
Catches/stumpings	2/–	178/–	72/–	83/–
Medal record
Men's cricket
Representing Australia
Maccabiah Games
Gold medal – first place	1997 Israel	Team
- Source: ESPNcricinfo, 8 September 2019

Michael Klinger (born 4 July 1980) is an Australian former first-class cricketer, who held the record for the most runs scored in the Big Bash League when he retired in 2019.

Until the 2008–09 season, Klinger played for Victoria and for St Kilda Cricket Club in Premier Cricket. He joined the South Australia Redbacks for the 2008–09 season, was named their Captain in 2010, and was recognised as the State Player of the Year in both 2009 and 2010. He was one of the 350 players under the hammer for the IPL Auction 2011, and was bought by Kochi Tuskers Kerala. In 2014 he was recruited by the Perth Scorchers and then also played for Western Australia. In March 2018, he announced his retirement from first-class cricket.

== Personal life ==
Klinger was born in Kew, Victoria, Australia, and is Jewish. He completed an undergraduate applied science degree in Human Movement, and a Master of Business (Sport Management) degree at Deakin University.

== Career ==
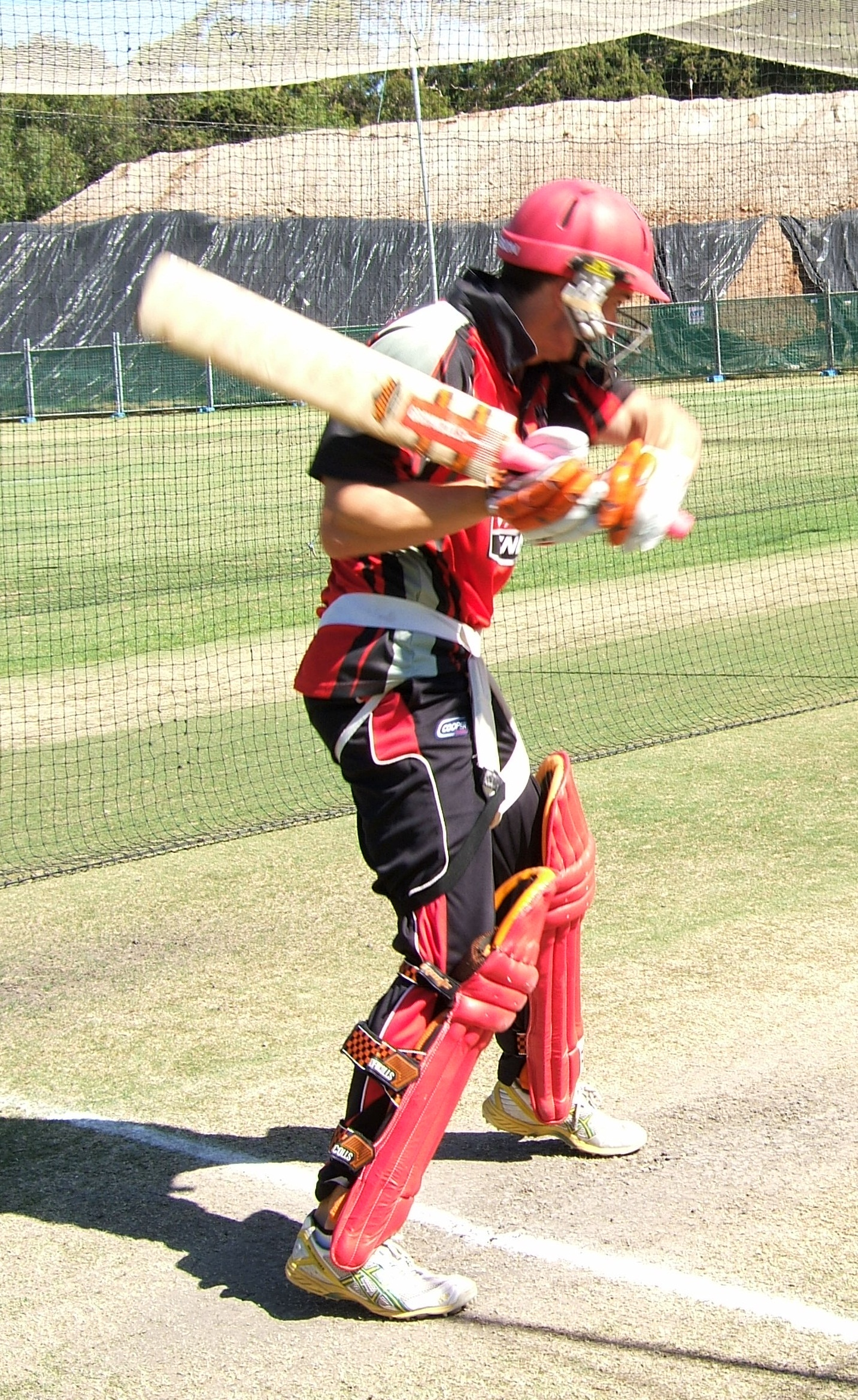
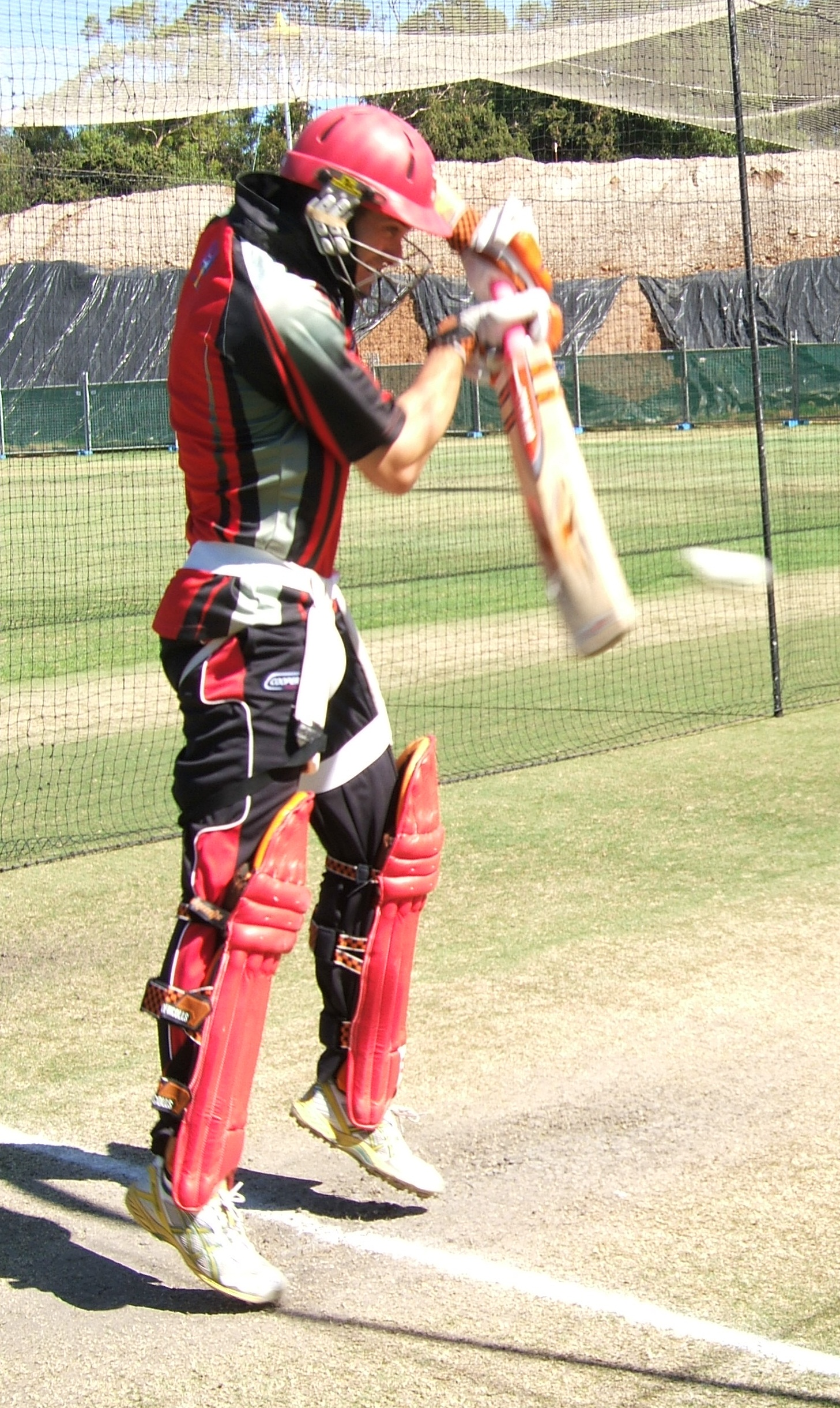
Michael Klinger batting in the nets in February 2010

As a young batsman, Klinger was named Captain of the Australia Under 19's Men's Cricket team – his deputy being Michael Clarke who subsequently became captain of the national team.

Klinger began as an 18-year-old in the 1998–99 season. His career lowlight was the 2000–01 season when he made a famous 99 not out, with captain Paul Reiffel declaring the innings closed, a move which brought great controversy and remains the only batsman in Australian cricket to be stranded on 99 due to a declaration. This caused Klinger some great upset, and following it Klinger had several less successful years, but returned to contention for a spot in the Victorian Bushrangers side for the 2005–06 season. He quickly made his first first-class century, and then followed it up with his first List A one-day century, but his first-class form soon dropped, and he was replaced in the side by Lloyd Mash, not to return in the Pura Cup all season. In 2003 he was the club professional for Walkden in the Bolton Cricket League.

In Season 2006–07 he started off in the outer from the Pura Cup side, but started off his Ford Ranger Cup season in style, nearly getting a century early on, and then following it up with one. He led the runs scoring in the competition for much of the season, eventually finishing 3rd. Klinger's rise to the Pura Cup team came only when Brad Hodge was called up by Australia for their ODI Series, and Klinger's recent form had been wavy, with his last game for the 2nd XI yielding a first innings duck, but second innings century. Klinger was soon to do the same for the 1st XI, but the century ensured that when Hodge returned, Klinger survived. He finished the season as a regular fixture of the Bushrangers side, and was part of a great partnership with David Hussey in a match against NSW, in which the Vics defied all odds to chase down a massive total of 360 on an extremely poor 4th day pitch (it was later described as a 3rd day pitch on day 1 by Hussey), scoring 102.

=== Move to South Australia ===
Klinger joined the South Australia Redbacks for the 2008–09 season in order to get more opportunities at state level, where he began batting at number 3 rather than opening, and saw immediate success, scoring a maiden 150 not out against old state Victoria in his first game. Then, against Western Australia on 11 November, Klinger scored his maiden double century, finishing on 255, and he continued to score heavily in both the Sheffield Shield and the Ford Ranger Cup, and hit his third century for the season against Queensland at the Gabba, and his first away from the traditionally batting friendly Adelaide Oval.

On 11 December 2008, Klinger posted his highest individual score in one day cricket, with an unbeaten 133 off just 128 balls. This guided South Australia to victory in their high-scoring match against the Tasmania Tigers at the Adelaide Oval. This was Klinger's fourth one-day century. He won the Australian Cricketers' Association's December 2008 Johnnie Walker player-of-the-month award.

In 2010, Klinger was named Captain of the Redbacks.

In November 2019, he was appointed as the head coach of Melbourne Renegades, an Australian franchise professional men's Twenty20 cricket team. He replaced former all-rounder Andrew McDonald who resigned for becoming Australia's assistant coach.

In 2026, he was appointed head coach of the professional women's cricket franchise Welsh Fire who compete in The Hundred.

=== Indian Premier League ===
Klinger was one of the 350 players under the hammer for the IPL Auction 2011, and was bought by Kochi Tuskers Kerala for US$ 75,000.

=== Gloucestershire ===
In December 2012, Klinger was signed by Gloucestershire County Cricket Club, not only as their overseas player for the 2013 season, but also as their captain, taking over from Alex Gidman. He had previously stood in for Phillip Hughes at Worcestershire at the beginning of the previous season. He scored over 1000 runs in the County Championship, scoring 6 centuries, plus another 1000 runs in the limited over competitions. Due to his success, Klinger returned to captain Gloucs again for the 2014 season. He was their leading run scorer in the One Day Cup, until he broke his arm playing against Derbyshire in August. In August 2015, he was confirmed as staying with the club for the 2016 season.

=== Western Australia ===
Klinger signed a two-year contract with Western Australia in April 2014. He recovered from the broken arm to make his debut for WA in the 2014–15 Matador BBQs One-Day Cup in October. Klinger scored 71 runs (not out) for the Perth Scorchers as they beat the Sydney Sixers to win the Big Bash League | 06 in January 2017.

== International career ==
Klinger competed for Australia at the 1997 Maccabiah Games in Israel when he was 17 years old, winning a gold medal.

In February 2017, Klinger was named in Australia's Twenty20 International (T20I) squad for their series against Sri Lanka. He made his T20I debut for Australia against Sri Lanka at the Melbourne Cricket Ground on 17 February 2017. At the age of 36, Klinger became the oldest player for Australia to debut in a T20I.

Despite having the 20th highest List A batting average of all time (49.33) and the second highest by an Australian, Klinger never played a One Day International.

== Awards ==
- State Cricket Players of the Year: 2009
- State Cricket Players of the Year: 2010

== See also ==
- List of select Jewish cricketers

== Sources ==
- Miller, A. (2001) Allan's Cricket Annual, Allan Miller: Perth. ISBN 0 9586122 3 4.
