= Sam Miller (cricketer) =

Australian cricketer (born 1988)

Personal information
- Born: 12 February 1988 (age 38); Ballarat, Victoria, Australia
- Source: Cricinfo, 23 August 2020

Sam Miller (born 12 February 1988) is an Australian cricketer. He played in three first-class matches for South Australia in 2012.

== See also ==
- List of South Australian representative cricketers
