= Manjot Singh (cricketer) =

Australian cricketer (born 1987)

Personal information
- Born: 2 October 1987 (age 39); St Leonards, New South Wales, Australia
- Source: ESPNcricinfo, 7 January 2017

Manjot Singh (born 2 October 1987) is an Australian cricketer. He played two first-class matches for New South Wales in 2013/14.

== See also ==
- List of New South Wales representative cricketers
