= Callum Ferguson =

Australian cricketer (born 1984)

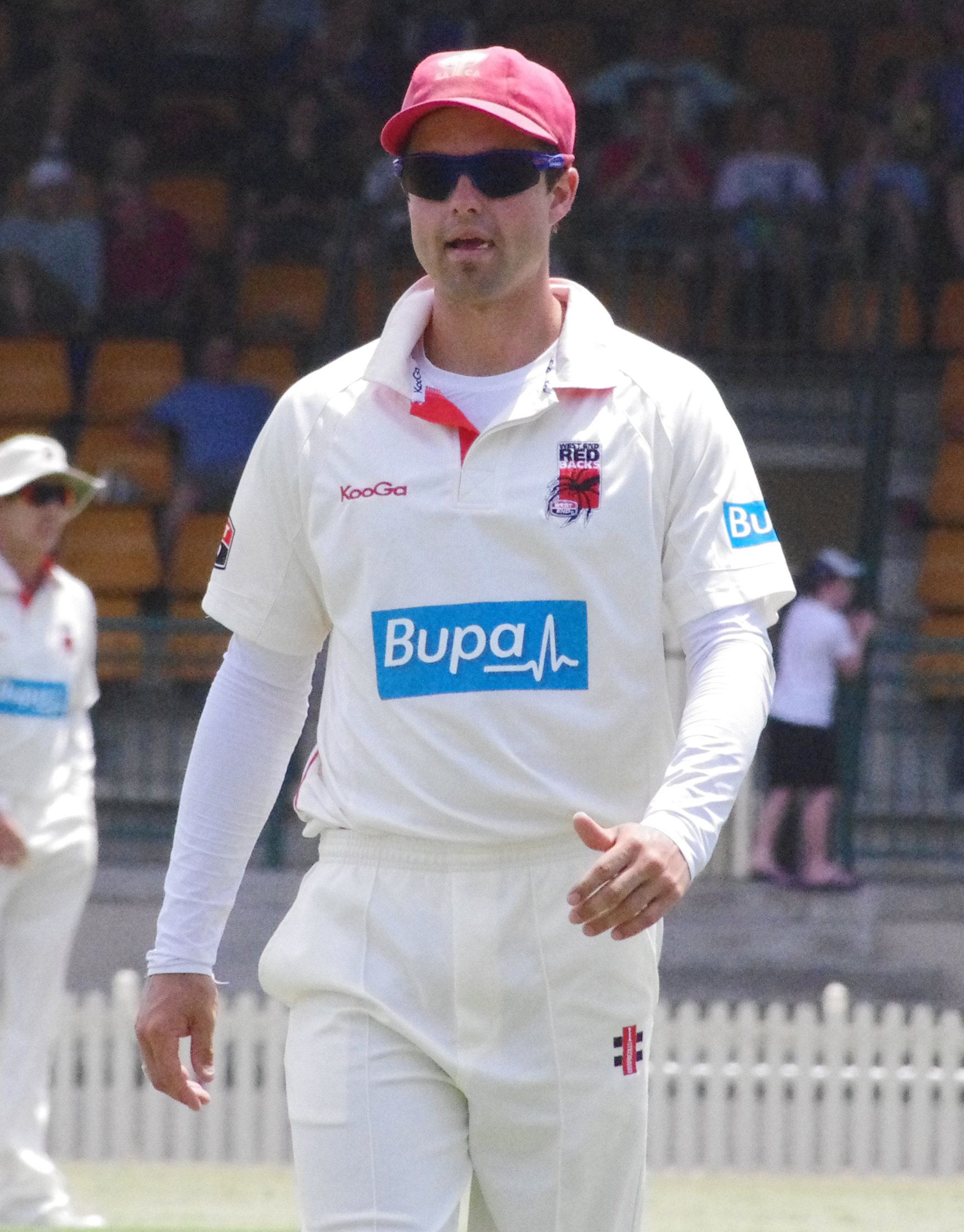
- Ferguson in November 2011

Personal information
- Full name: Callum James Ferguson
- Born: 21 November 1984 (age 42); North Adelaide, Australia
- Batting: Right-handed
- Bowling: Right-arm medium
- Role: Middle-order batter

International information
- National side: Australia (2009–2016)
- Only Test (cap 445): 12 November 2016 v South Africa
- ODI debut (cap 171): 6 February 2009 v New Zealand
- Last ODI: 13 April 2011 v Bangladesh
- T20I debut (cap 33): 15 February 2009 v New Zealand
- Last T20I: 7 May 2009 v Pakistan

Domestic team information
- Years: Team
- 2002/03–2020/21: South Australia
- 2011–2012: Pune Warriors India
- 2011/12–2013/14: Adelaide Strikers
- 2014/15–2016/17: Melbourne Renegades
- 2017/18–2020/21: Sydney Thunder
- 2018–2019: Worcestershire

Career statistics
Competition	Test	ODI	FC	LA
Matches	1	30	147	175
Runs scored	4	663	9,386	5,952
Batting average	2.00	41.43	37.09	42.82
100s/50s	0/0	0/5	20/49	14/31
Top score	3	71*	213	192
Balls bowled	–	–	149	30
Wickets	–	–	2	1
Bowling average	–	–	49.50	22.00
5 wickets in innings	–	–	0	0
10 wickets in match	–	–	0	0
Best bowling	–	–	2/32	1/8
Catches/stumpings	0/–	7/–	87/–	52/–
- Source: ESPNcricinfo, 4 October 2021

Callum James Ferguson (born 21 November 1984) is a former Australian cricketer and commentator who has represented Australia in all three forms of international cricket. He also represented South Australia in Australian domestic first-class cricket. He was formerly the captain of the Sydney Thunder in the Big Bash League before being released at the end of the 2020–21 season

Ferguson began his domestic career in the 2004–05 season, and by 2009 his form in limited overs cricket was good enough for him to be selected by the Australian national cricket team. Though his form in ODIs was strong, bolstering Australia's middle order, a knee injury in the 2009 ICC Champions Trophy final took him out of competitive cricket for 11 months and he lost his place in the national side. He has played few ODIs since, and he played a single Test match in 2016 against South Africa, scoring 4 runs across his two innings.

Ferguson has played for South Australia for his entire domestic career, which spanned over fourteen seasons. When the Big Bash League was created he initially played for the Adelaide Strikers, but played for the Melbourne Renegades for three seasons after moving in the 2014–15 season and now plays for the Sydney Thunder. He also spent two seasons playing for Pune Warriors India in the Indian Premier League. In the 2019 BBL he scored 113*, the top score in BBL 2019.

During the 2020-21 Sheffield shield season Ferguson announced he was retiring from first class cricket. He said “Once I got left out of the first game of the year, it knocked a bit of the wind out of my sails”. He conceded that being dropped sped up his retirement.

On the 7th of February 2021, Ferguson was notified that he would not be offered a contract for the 2021-22 Big Bash season despite captaining the franchise for the last 2 seasons.

Following his retirement from cricket, Ferguson works as a commentator for Triple M, Seven and Nine Australia.

== Early life ==
Ferguson attended Blackfriars Priory School in Prospect, South Australia before moving to Marryatville High School in Year 9, where he completed his schooling. Ferguson started his cricket with the Prospect District Cricket Club before moving to the West Torrens Cricket Club in the 2005/06 season. He has since become captain of West Torrens DCC and had the Ferguson-George Cricket Academy for promising young players in the West Torrens zone named after him and Southern Redbacks teammate and fellow Australian Cricket Representative Peter George. In 2003 he was awarded a scholarship to the Australian Cricket Academy.

== Early career ==
=== Youth career (2002–2004) ===
Ferguson played his first game for South Australia in their final game of the 2002–03 ING Cup, Australia's domestic one-day tournament, on 16 February 2003. He came in at number 9 and scored 3 runs. After captaining South Australia in the 2003 Commonwealth Bank Under-19 Championship Series, Ferguson was selected to in Australia's squad for the 2004 Under-19 Cricket World Cup. He played three matches in the 2003–04 ING Cup, scoring a half-century against Victoria. During a warmup match two days before Australia's first match in the World Cup he faced the first knee injury of his career, leaving him unable to play any matches in the World Cup.

=== First-class debut and inconsistent form (2004–2008) ===
Ferguson made his first-class debut for South Australia on 16 October 2004 against Victoria at South Australia's home ground, the Adelaide Oval, with scores of 2 and 46. In just his second match, he top-scored for South Australia with 93 in the second innings against Queensland, almost taking the Redbacks to an unlikely victory. Ferguson scored a duck in a disastrous yet memorable innings for South Australia in which they were dismantled for a record low total of 29, mainly due to a devastating spell of 7/4 from Australian representative Nathan Bracken. He scored his maiden first-class century in the second innings of the match with a score of 103. He had a very strong debut season overall, top scoring for Redbacks with 733 runs at an average of 38.57 runs per wicket. He also scored 225 at an average of 28.12 in the one-day ING Cup.

Ferguson's second season also saw him produce solid results, as he scored 506 first-class runs at an average of 36.14 and was one of 15 players to be selected for the Australian Cricket Academy. He was less successful in one-day matches, only scoring 175 runs at an average of 21.87. He fell into poor form in the 2006–07 season, averaging under 30 in both first-class and one-day matches. This resulted in him being dropped from the South Australian side in December before being recalled in late February, when he scored a match-winning half century in a one-day match against Tasmania.

Ferguson's first opportunity of the 2007–08 season came in a Pura Cup match against New South Wales where he managed a first-innings score of 83, showing particular skill with the drive shot, and a second-innings score of 59. He scored his third first-class fifty in a row in Darren Lehmann's farewell match against Western Australia. For the 2008 winter, Ferguson went to northern England to play for Netherfield Cricket Club after being told by his state coaches that he needed to convert his starts into larger scores more often. During his time at the club he managed to score 1381 runs at an average of 106, including six fifties and six centuries.

== ODI career ==
=== Early successes (2009) ===
In the early part of Ferguson's career he had been known for regularly failing to build on solid starts to his innings, but the 2008–09 season proved to be a breakout season for him. In a breakout performance against Western Australia he finally scored his maiden List A century with an 83-ball 101. He then scored two 50s against Tasmania and New South Wales. Ferguson scored totals of 81 and 115 in a Sheffield Shield match against Victoria, and five minutes after his second dismissal he learned that he would be brought into the national team's 13-man squad for the second and third ODIs against New Zealand due to the absence of captain Ricky Ponting and an injury to Shaun Marsh. He made his One Day International debut, his first match representing Australia, against New Zealand at the Melbourne Cricket Ground on 6 February 2009. He came in late in Australia's innings to score 6 not out off 6 balls. He also made his Twenty20 International debut against New Zealand, batting at number 3 and scoring 8 runs.

Within only a few matches for Australia, Ferguson started to build a reputation as the middle-order stabiliser. He scored his first ODI half-century against New Zealand at the Gabba with 55 not out while Australia faced top-order wobbles. After the New Zealand series Ferguson was included in Australia's squad for their series in South Africa. In the second match he scored another ODI half-century, resurrecting the Australian innings after they'd collapsed to 5 for 19, though his work wasn't enough to get Australia the win. In the third match he again had to try to rebuild Australia's innings, as they were 5 for 114 needing to reach target of 290. He scored a cool-headed 63 from 68 balls to give them a fighting chance, but again it was all in vain and Australia lost by 25 runs.

Though Ferguson was initially named in Australia's 30-man squad for the 2009 ICC World Twenty20 he was cut from the final squad of 15. Chairman of selectors Andrew Hilditch described cutting Ferguson as "the hardest selection of them all," saying "He is a young kid who has taken all the opportunities that have come his way and done exceptionally well. He is desperately unlucky not to be in the squad." He was, however, given a Cricket Australia contract for the 2009–10 season. Ferguson remained in the ODI squad when he was included in the team for Australia's ODIs in England and Scotland at the end of the 2009 season. In this series he had the best ODI innings of his career, surviving through difficult bowling spells to score 71 not out at The Oval against England and being awarded the man of the match, with Australian captain Michael Clarke noting the "beauty" of his batting. He was one of the key players for Australia in the series win against England, scoring two half-centuries and twice being at the crease to seal run chases.

=== Champions Trophy, Injury and Return (2009–2011) ===
Ferguson was part of Australia's 2009 ICC Champions Trophy-winning squad in South Africa, which he described as the "hugest" event of his career so far. During the tournament's final against New Zealand, Ferguson injured his knee while fielding. He would have been prepared to bat in Australia's run chase if needed, though later tests revealed that he would require a knee reconstruction, taking out of competitive cricket for at least six months. Despite not being able to play for the rest of the season, Ferguson kept his contract with Australia. Ferguson came back from injury to be named in Australia's squad for their ODI series in India in October 2010, but persistent rain meant he was unable to play any matches and he was then left out of Australia's squad for the next ODI series against Sri Lanka until a back injury forced Shaun Marsh out of the team.

Ferguson made his first-class return from his injury in the 2010–11 Sheffield Shield season with a century in Brisbane, putting his name up to potentially play in the 2010–11 Ashes and earning a place in an Australia A squad for a tour match against England, but he didn't impress national selectors with scores of 7 and 10. Though he was included in a large 17-man squad for the first Ashes test, his poor form in the Australia A match meant he failed to earn his baggy green.

Ferguson was again added to the Australian ODI squad for the last two matches of the ODI series against England when Shaun Marsh had a hamstring injury, which led to his selection in Australia's 15-man squad for the 2011 Cricket World Cup. He did not get to play a match and Australia were eliminated in the quarter-finals. His last chance came in Australia's ODI series in Bangladesh in April 2011. Ferguson came into the side in the second ODI to replace the out-of-form Cameron White but was not required to bat as Australia only lost one wicket in their innings. He played his final ODI in the third match of the series, scoring just 3 runs off 6 balls. He had not done enough to retain his spot in the squad for their tour of Sri Lanka in August 2011.

== Post-ODI career ==
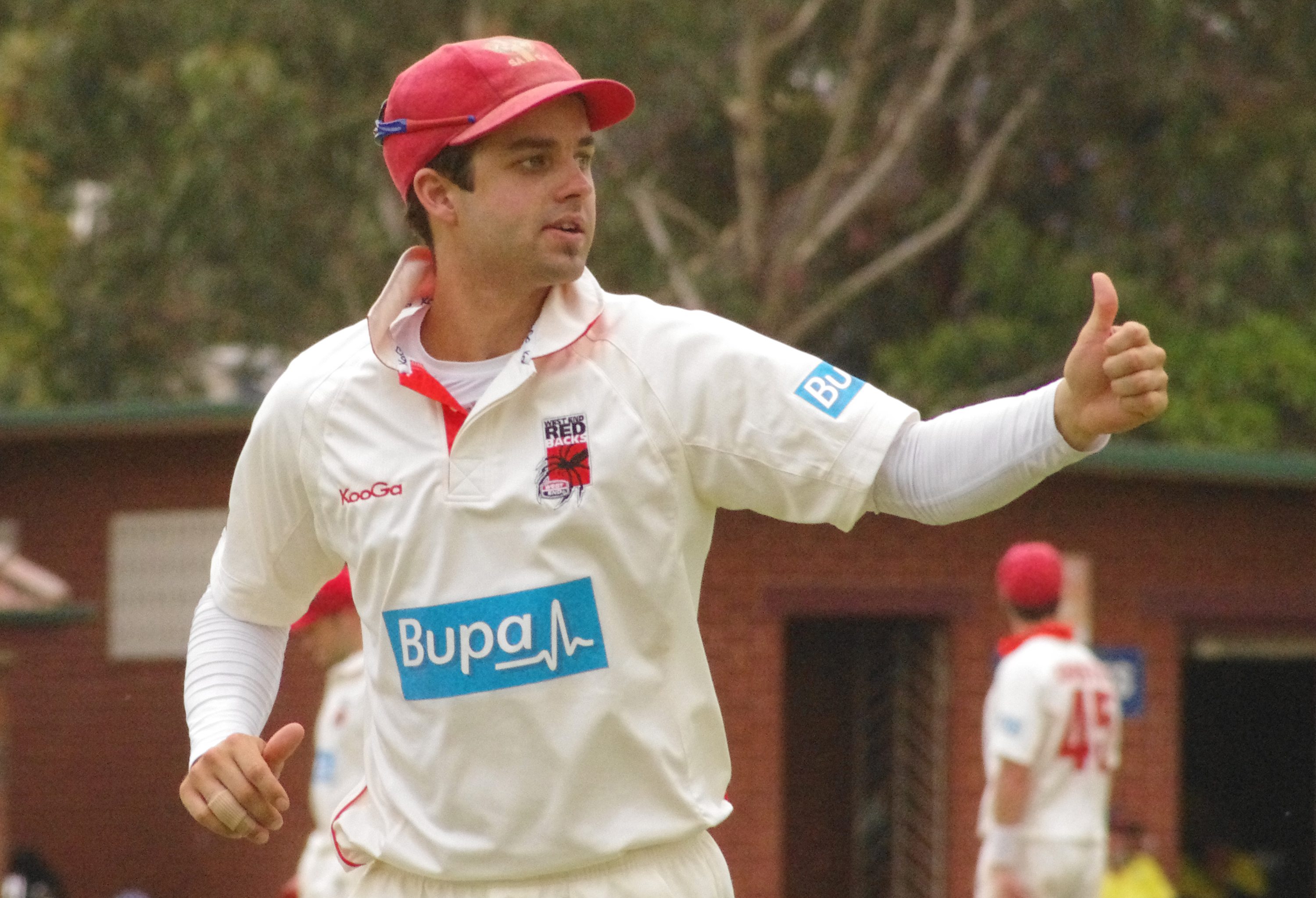
Ferguson playing for South Australia in 2011

Ferguson signed up for the 2011 Indian Premier League player auction, where he was bought by the Pune Warriors India for $300,000, though he missed the start of the tournament as he was still with the Australian side in Bangladesh at the time. When he was able to play in the tournament he was still left out of the side for most of the matches, playing with relative ease when he did eventually get to play. He played five matches for the tournament and scored 48 runs, though he did so at less than a run a ball. He was kept on by Pune for the 2012 season, but he only managed to play 4 matches with the very low strike rate of 79.36 runs per 100 balls.

Since his brief ODI career, Ferguson has consistently performed well enough in domestic cricket to be in contention to play for Australia, but has struggled to actually break into the Australian side. He hit a match-winning century against Western Australia on 23 October 2011, battling to take South Australia from 8 for 170 to their target of 234 along with tailender Nathan Lyon. He remarkably top-scored for South Australia with 126 in spite of an innings loss to Western Australia in a Sheffield Shield loss, after which he scored an unbeaten 56 against the Warriors in a one-day win two days later. He was part of South Australia's Ryobi Cup-winning team, breaking a 25-year drought for the state. He was named as 12th man in the one-day team of the year.

After the Redbacks began the 2012–13 Sheffield Shield season with back-to-back losses, Ferguson fought hard to score one of the best centuries of his first-class career against Queensland, eventually reaching his highest first-class score with a total of 164. Ferguson scored his only one-day century for the 2012–13 season against Victoria on 9 February. Suffering from a groin problem he still managed to top-score for South Australia against New South Wales on 14 February with 78 runs. At the end of the season he was named in both the Sheffield Shield and limited overs ACA Teams of the Year.

Ferguson only played one match in the 2013–14 Ryobi One-Day Cup, scoring 21 runs against Victoria, as he was called up to replace injured Australian captain Michael Clarke for their ODI series in India, though he did not play an international. He scored his only century for the season in a Sheffield Shield match against Victoria, reaching 110 runs. In the next match against New South Wales he hit ten fours and two sixes to put on 80 and was part of a 148-run partnership with Phillip Hughes. He played only four matches in BBL|03 for the Adelaide Strikers, and only managed to score 37 runs across them.

During the 2014 winter, Ferguson was named to play for Australia A in a quadrangular tournament and a series of unofficial Test matches. His best performance for the side came in the final match against South Africa A, where he scored 82 runs as part of a 182-run partnership with Phillip Hughes.

Ferguson had to fight hard for runs in the 2014–15 Matador BBQs One-Day Cup as South Australia had a poor tournament and finished as the bottom-placed team. In their opening match of the season against New South Wales, Ferguson had to rebuild the innings as the Redbacks had collapsed to 3 for 23. He top-scored with 82 and forged a 136-run partnership with Alex Ross. Against Queensland he was the only batsman for South Australia to put up a fight, scoring a 91-ball 98 in a team total of 257. He again saved the Redbacks from disaster, though they were still unable to win, against Western Australia at the end of the tournament, scoring a run-a-ball 82 to top score again.

Ferguson started the Sheffield Shield with an unbeaten century against Queensland, finishing on exactly 100 not out when the Redbacks declared in the first innings on their way to an eight-wicket win. He scored his second century in three matches against Victoria, scoring a total of 140 in the first innings, though he scored only 4 in the second innings while the Redbacks suffered an innings loss. He top-scored for South Australia when they scored the lowest Sheffield Shield total in ten years. Ferguson was the only player to reach double figures, scoring 11 out of their 45 runs.

In BBL|04 Ferguson played for the Melbourne Renegades, who consistently struggled with their batting. In a tight match against the Melbourne Stars which came down to the final ball, Ferguson looked to have run out Tom Triffitt with a direct throw at the wickets at the bowler's end, but a third umpire decided that the bails had been dislodged by the body of bowler Nathan Rimmington, giving the Stars the win over the Renegades. When the Sheffield Shield resumed, Ferguson fell short of a century twice in the same match against Western Australia, with scores of 81 and 84 in a loss. He followed this up by scoring a match-winning unbeaten century against Tasmania, and in the final match he scored another century against Queensland, as part of both a 156-run partnership with Mark Cosgrove and a 99-run partnership with Tom Cooper.

During the 2015 winter, Ferguson toured India with Australia A, playing one unofficial Test match and five unofficial ODIs. He then began the 2015–16 season in great form, scoring three centuries with only one dismissal in the West End Premier League to achieve an average of 405. This form, in combination with his recent experience with the Australia A side, put him in contention to play for Australia. He continued his good form in the first half of the 2015–16 Sheffield Shield season, scoring 478 runs at an average of 53.11, including his new highest first-class score of 213 against Tasmania in a 378-run partnership with Jake Lehmann. Unfortunately for Ferguson, when he was training with the Melbourne Renegades in December, he suffered a serious knee injury for the third time in his career, prematurely ending his season.

== Test debut and later career ==
=== Return from injury and Test debut (2016) ===
Ferguson returned from his knee injury over the off-season and, in his first match back in competitive cricket, he scored 122 in the Premier League. He was then named the captain of South Australia's 14-man squad for the 2016–17 Matador BBQs One-Day Cup due to the absence of Travis Head, who was in South Africa playing for Australia at the time. On 12 October he led the Redbacks to their first win of the tournament, a six-wicket bonus-point upset of New South Wales, with a score of 72 not out. He followed this up with a century against Cricket Australia XI, his career-best at 154 runs off just 113 balls. His 225-run partnership with Jake Weatherald was the highest second-wicket partnership for South Australia in any one-day match, and the state's third-highest one-day partnership ever. South Australia finished with 420, the highest ever score in Australia's domestic one-day competition history.

Ferguson played his 100th first-class match in the opening game of the Sheffield Shield against Western Australia. Batting second, the Redbacks were reduced to 2/16 at stumps on the first day, with Ferguson coming on in the morning. He struck a fast-paced 101 runs off 127 balls to lead South Australia to a total of 505 and an overall first-innings lead of 234 in what became a 10-wicket win. Due to his strong form he was added to Australia's Test squad for their series against South Africa. Ferguson became the 445th Test cricketer for Australia when he played against South Africa on 12 November 2016 at Bellerive Oval in Hobart, making his debut along with Redbacks teammate Joe Mennie, the 446th Test cricketer for Australia. Former Test cricket and former South Australian teammate Greg Blewett presented him with his baggy green. Within an hour of the beginning of the match, Ferguson came in to face a hat trick ball from Vernon Philander with Australia already at 4/8. Though he survived the ball, he went on to run himself out after scoring just three runs, leaving Australia at 5/16. He went even worse in his second innings, only scoring one run before he was caught out. Ferguson was dropped from the Test team immediately after his debut match, which turned out to be a controversial decision. His replacement was the younger Nic Maddinson, who had a less consistent and less successful first-class record than Ferguson, and former Australian Test cricketers Brett Lee and Michael Hussey both said that he had been unlucky to be dropped after having just one opportunity. Maddinson played the next 3 test matches with a similar lack of scoring and was himself dropped for the final match of that Test summer for Hilton Cartwright.

=== Later career (2016–present) ===
After his unsuccessful Test debut for Australia, Ferguson was unable to recapture his first-class form. He scored just four runs in both innings of his next match, and by BBL|06 he had batted in six innings since the Test with a high score of 24. Ferguson played every match for the Melbourne Renegades in BBL|06 and scored 183 at a strike rate of 150 runs per 100 balls. When the Sheffield Shield resumed, one issue for Ferguson was struggling against the new ball, as the Redbacks’ inexperienced opening partners Sam Raphael and Jake Weatherald were often dismissed early, forcing him to come in early and face the new ball. After three months without a first-class century, Ferguson broke his drought against New South Wales. He scored 75 and 103 in an 8-wicket loss, having only averaged 8.1 runs per innings since his Test debut. He scored 90 in the final match against Tasmania, taking the side through to the final, the first Shield final of Ferguson's career. The match ended in a draw, meaning South Australia lost the tournament to Victoria.

Ferguson was again named as the captain of the Redbacks’ 14-man squad for the 2017–18 JLT One-Day Cup in the absence of Travis Head, who was playing for Australia in India at the time. In the 15th match, he anchored the Redbacks innings with 72 runs off 71 balls, the team's highest score in a total of 356, and in the team's final match before the finals, the Redbacks needed a win against Western Australia to make it through to the finals. Ferguson won the toss and chose to bat first, going on to score 169 runs, the highest total in his one-day career, to help the team win by just 5 runs. As Travis Head returned from India in time for the finals, Ferguson handed the captaincy back over to him, and they progressed to the final against Western Australia, where Ferguson hit seven boundaries but fell for just 37 runs as the Redbacks lost by six wickets. Ferguson finished the tournament as the sixth-highest run-scorer, and the highest for the Redbacks, with a total of 358 runs across 8 matches.

Ferguson hit career-best form in the 2017–18 Sheffield Shield season. He scored an unbeaten 182 in a match against Victoria, the highest score of the season to that point. With 343 runs at an average of 68 in the first three matches of the season.

After three years at the Melbourne Renegades, Ferguson signed a three-year contract with the Sydney Thunder for BBL|07, BBL|08 and BBL|09. In March 2018, Cricket Australia named Ferguson in their Sheffield Shield team of the year.

He made his debut for Worcestershire (Worcestershire Rapids) in May 2018 in the Royal London Cup 50 over competition, scoring 192 off 143 balls against Leicestershire- on debut.

In the opening game of BBL|09 against Brisbane Heat, Ferguson was man of the match. In April 2021, he was signed by Lahore Qalandars to play in the rescheduled matches in the 2021 Pakistan Super League.
