= Ryan Carters =

Australian cricketer (born 1990)

Personal information
- Full name: Ryan Graham Leslie Carters
- Born: 25 July 1990 (age 36); Canberra, Australian Capital Territory
- Batting: Right-handed
- Role: Wicket-keeper

Domestic team information
- Years: Team
- 2009/10–2012/13: Victoria
- 2012/13–2013/14: Sydney Thunder
- 2013/14–2016/17: New South Wales
- 2014/15–2016/17: Sydney Sixers

Career statistics
Competition	FC	LA	T20
Matches	43	22	35
Runs scored	2,515	345	319
Batting average	35.92	31.36	15.19
100s/50s	5/11	0/1	0/0
Top score	209	65	35*
Catches/stumpings	66/1	13/1	29/2
- Source: ESPNcricinfo, 12 May 2017

Ryan Graham Leslie Carters (born 25 July 1990) is an Australian former cricketer who represented New South Wales in the Australian domestic cricket competition and the Sydney Sixers in the Big Bash League. In May 2017, he announced his retirement from all forms of cricket.

Originally from Canberra, Carters played for the ACT Comets in the Cricket Australia Cup as well as Wests/ University of Canberra Cricket Club in the local Canberra grade competition. Carters moved to Melbourne in the 2009–10 season, making his first class debut in 2010 for Victoria. He moved to New South Wales for the 2013–1414 season, and cemented his place in the Shield team with hundreds in back-to-back Sheffield Shield matches at the start of the season. He was awarded the NSW 2013–1414 Sheffield Shield Player of the Year and the following season won the NSW One Day Player of the Year award.

Carters and Aaron Finch hold the Australian first class cricket record for the most runs ever scored in an opening partnership when they scored 503 during a tour match against New Zealand in Sydney in 2015.

== Retirement ==
Carters retired from all forms of cricket on 12 May 2017. He played 43 first class matches. He left the game to pursue higher education at Harvard University with the goal of leadership and service. He received his Master of Public Policy from Harvard in 2020.

== Personal life ==
Carters is married to the writer Sarah Darmody and has three children, including one born in Cambridge, Massachusetts while he was studying at Harvard University. Carters is a supporter of the Canberra Raiders in the National Rugby League.

Carters is the founder of Batting for Change, in partnership with the LBW Trust Charity.

In 2023 Carters founded community group dadfit in Melbourne.
