= Peter George (cricketer) =

Australian cricketer

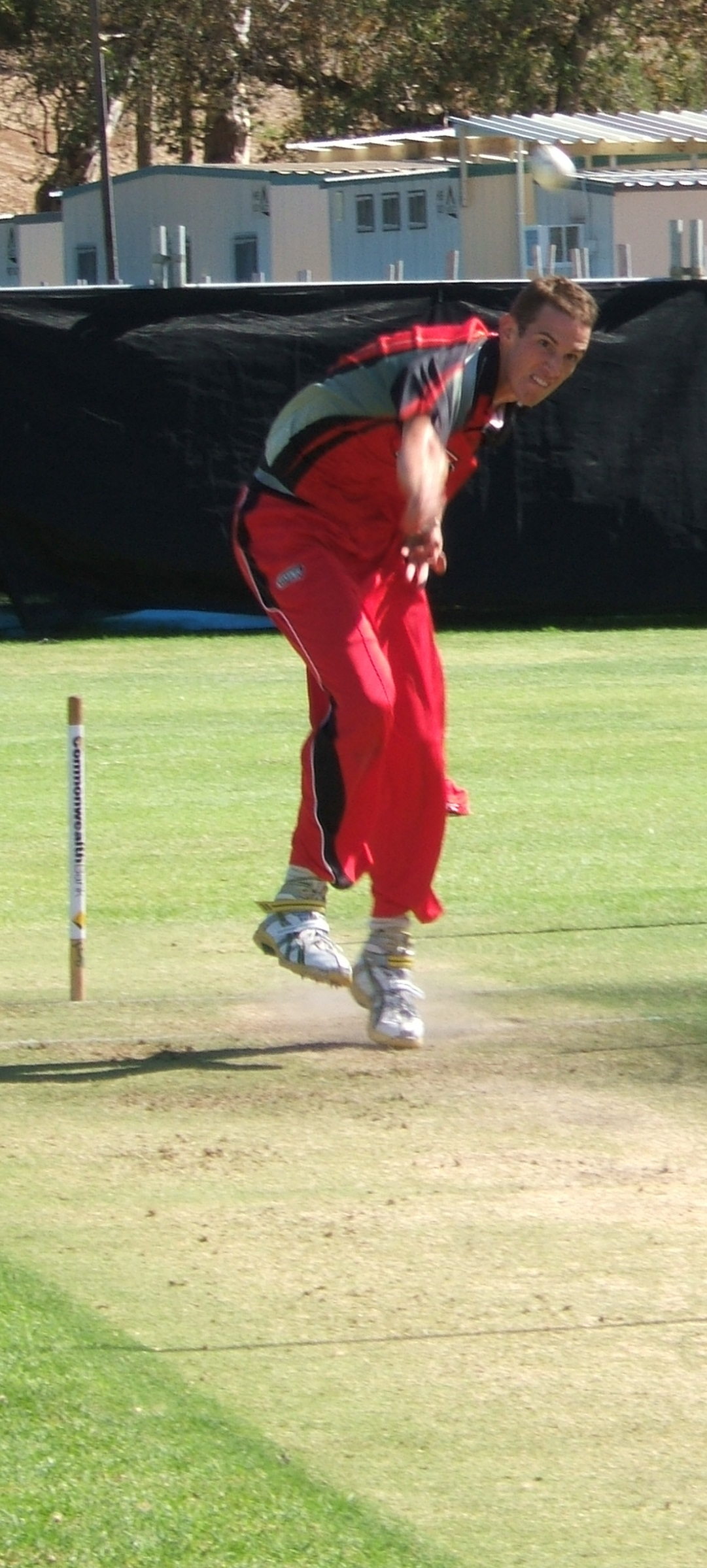

Personal information
- Full name: Peter Robert George
- Born: 16 October 1986 (age 40); Woodville, Adelaide, South Australia
- Height: 2.03 m (6 ft 8 in)
- Batting: Right-handed
- Bowling: Right-arm fast-medium
- Role: Bowler

International information
- National side: Australia (2010)
- Only Test (cap 416): 8 October 2010 v India

Domestic team information
- Years: Team
- 2008/09–2013/14: South Australia
- 2014/15–2018/19: Queensland

Career statistics
Competition	Test	FC	LA
Matches	1	64	22
Runs scored	2	167	11
Batting average	1.00	3.63	5.50
100s/50s	0/0	0/0	0/0
Top score	2	22	4*
Balls bowled	168	12,259	1,164
Wickets	2	207	25
Bowling average	38.50	30.75	37.76
5 wickets in innings	0	5	1
10 wickets in match	0	1	0
Best bowling	2/48	8/84	5/39
Catches/stumpings	0/–	12/–	7/–
- Source: CricInfo, 9 February 2016

Peter Robert George (born 16 October 1986) is a former Australian Test cricketer. A right-arm fast-medium bowler, George played his first-class cricket for South Australia and then the Queensland Bulls before retiring at the conclusion of the 2019 season.

== Profile ==
George, who was born at Woodville, South Australia, gained a rookie contract with the state side in 2005/06 but lost it the very next season. He regained a contract in the 2008/09 season. He made his Test cricket debut for Australia in the second Test against India at Bangalore.

He is one of the tallest players in Australian domestic cricket with a height of 203 cm.

George progressed through the grades of the West Torrens DCC, and unlike many other Test Match players struggled to make an impact in junior grades. However, around the 2005/06 season, George started taking hauls of wickets in the A grade for the Western Eagles and soon won a place in the South Australian Shield Cricket team. He recently was honoured with the naming of the Ferguson-George Cricket Academy for promising young players in the West Torrens zone named after him and Southern Redbacks team-mate and fellow Australian Cricket Representative Callum Ferguson.

In 2014, George moved to Queensland on a rookie contract in the hope of more opportunity. In the Matador Cup, George capitalized on his chances, taking 11 wickets. Before the 2015/16 season, George was rewarded with a senior contract by the Bulls.

== Bowling ==
George has been compared in style to former fast-bowler Glenn McGrath. His first class debut was for the Redbacks in November of the 2008/09 season. He took 4 for 56 against Tasmania in Hobart.

George holds the record for best bowling figures at Bellerive Oval with the figures 8 for 84.

George was a member of the Australian Test touring squad in 2010, first being called in as an emergency replacement midway through the 2009–10 tour of New Zealand after a series of injuries to Australian pacemen, then joining the team for the 2010 series against Pakistan in England and the 2010–11 tour of India. He played his only Test in the Second Test against India in Bangalore, taking two wickets.

== Personal life ==
His parents Rob and Gayle were Physical Education teachers and met at teachers college. Peter George and his wife Susie, are Christians. They were at school together at Temple Christian College, Mile End and were together for three years before marrying, aged 21.
