= David Hussey =

Australian cricketer (born 1977)

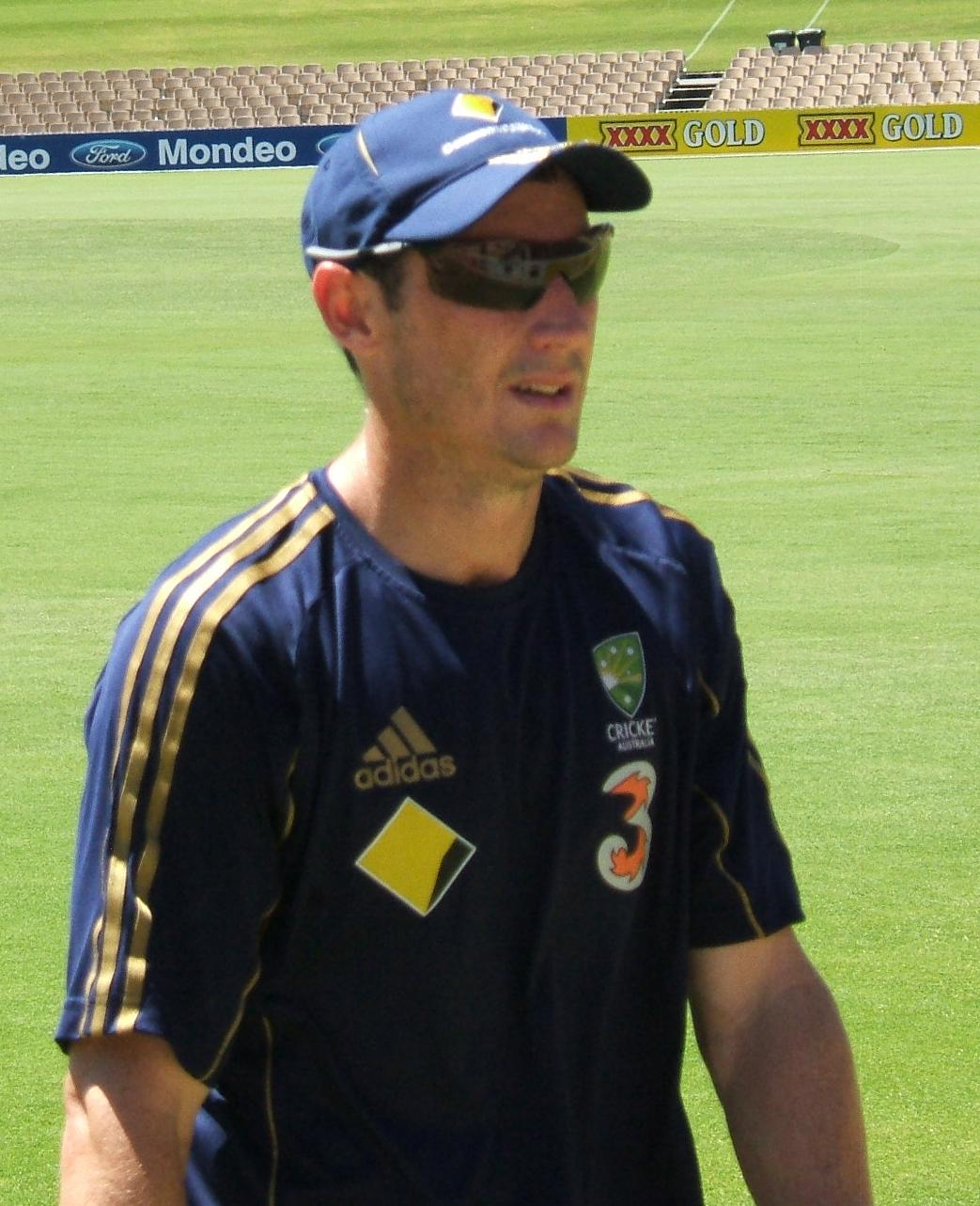

Personal information
- Full name: David John Hussey
- Born: 15 July 1977 (age 49); Mount Lawley, Western Australia
- Nickname: Huss
- Height: 1.80 m (5 ft 11 in)
- Batting: Right-handed
- Bowling: Right-arm offbreak
- Role: All-rounder
- Relatives: Michael Hussey (brother)

International information
- National side: Australia (2008–2013)
- ODI debut (cap 167): 4 July 2008 v West Indies
- Last ODI: 23 January 2013 v Sri Lanka
- ODI shirt no.: 29
- T20I debut (cap 29): 1 February 2008 v India
- Last T20I: 5 October 2012 v West Indies

Domestic team information
- Years: Team
- 2002/03–2014/15: Victoria (squad no. 8)
- 2004–2013: Nottinghamshire (squad no. 29)
- 2008–2010: Kolkata Knight Riders
- 2010/11: Northern Districts
- 2011–2013: Kings XI Punjab (squad no. 29)
- 2011/12–2016/17: Melbourne Stars (squad no. 8)
- 2014: Chennai Super Kings
- 2014: Antigua Hawksbills

Career statistics
Competition	ODI	T20I	FC	LA
Matches	69	39	192	260
Runs scored	1,796	756	14,280	8,152
Batting average	32.65	22.90	52.50	39.96
100s/50s	1/14	0/3	45/65	10/57
Top score	111	88*	275	140*
Balls bowled	802	361	3,052	2,481
Wickets	18	19	31	51
Bowling average	38.77	20.63	60.70	42.80
5 wickets in innings	0	0	0	0
10 wickets in match	0	0	0	0
Best bowling	4/21	3/25	4/105	4/21
Catches/stumpings	29/–	24/–	246/–	123/–
- Source: ESPNcricinfo, 19 October 2015

David John Hussey (born 15 July 1977) is an Australian cricket coach and former cricketer. Hussey is a right-handed batter and can also bowl right-arm off breaks. He is the younger brother of former Australian cricketer Michael Hussey. He was captain of the Melbourne Stars in the Big Bash League.

== Australian domestic career ==
Hussey's cricketing prowess was perhaps first widely acknowledged after an innings for the Victorian Bushrangers in 2003–04, his first full season of first-class cricket. Hussey scored 212 not out as his side scored a record 455/7 in the 4th innings to beat New South Wales in Newcastle. He finished the Australian season with an aggregate 857 runs at an average of 61. In 2004–05 season, his four-day form let him down and he was dropped from the Victorian Pura Cup side. Hussey unsuccessfully asked Cricket Victoria for a release to return to Western Australia. Another modest Pura Cup season for Victoria in 2005–06 saw him make 500 runs at an average of just over 30. It was again in the one day arena where he impressed as he smashed 535 runs at 76.42. This tally included 130 against Queensland and he won the state's limited-overs player-of-the-year award. In 2006–07 season, he repeated his Newcastle heroics with another match winning unbeaten century to beat NSW in the 4th innings. Captaining the side in the absence of Cameron White and Brad Hodge, Hussey finished with 125 as his side made 362 for 7 chasing 360 for victory. The winning runs came from his bat with a 6 off Stuart MacGill. It took his first thousand-run season in 2007–08 (he made 1,008 in the Pura Cup at 56) before he was finally chosen for a tour, the ODI series in the West Indies in 2008, and earned his first Cricket Australia contract. In February 2008, Hussey made the second fastest Australian domestic one-day hundred, off 60 balls. Hussey played as a Twenty20 all-rounder, bowling in all Victoria's matches with success (a wicket in all but one game and leaving him with 10 for the tournament). In 2007–08, Hussey was named Victoria's Player of the Year in all three domestic cricket formats.

In 2013, Hussey was involved in an incident in the 2013 Big Bash League, with Marlon Samuels and Shane Warne, after Samuels had grabbed Hussey while in the process of running between the wickets which followed Warne abusing Samuels in the following innings, and Samuels throwing his bat in Warne's direction.

== English cricket ==
Hussey started his English cricket career at Horsham Cricket Club in Sussex. From 2004, Hussey played for county side Nottinghamshire. In the English summer of 2004, Hussey score 1208 runs for Nottinghamshire. In 2005, he had another prolific season, scoring 1231 runs. He hit two centuries and one double century, 232* against Warwickshire as his county went on to win the championship. In the subsequent county season, Hussey scored a career best 275, off just 227 balls and with 14 sixes. His record for the year was an exceptional 1,219 runs at 93.76. Hussey signed for Nottinghamshire County Cricket Club for the 2008 and 2009 seasons, but due to commitments to the Australian national team withdrew from the end of the 2008 season.

Hussey returned to Notts for the majority of the 2010 season, and left the county at the end of the 2013 season, signing off with a century against Somerset in the County Championships. During his final season, he also helped Notts beat Glamorgan by 87 runs to win the YB40 final at Lord's, their first one-day trophy since 1989.

== International career ==
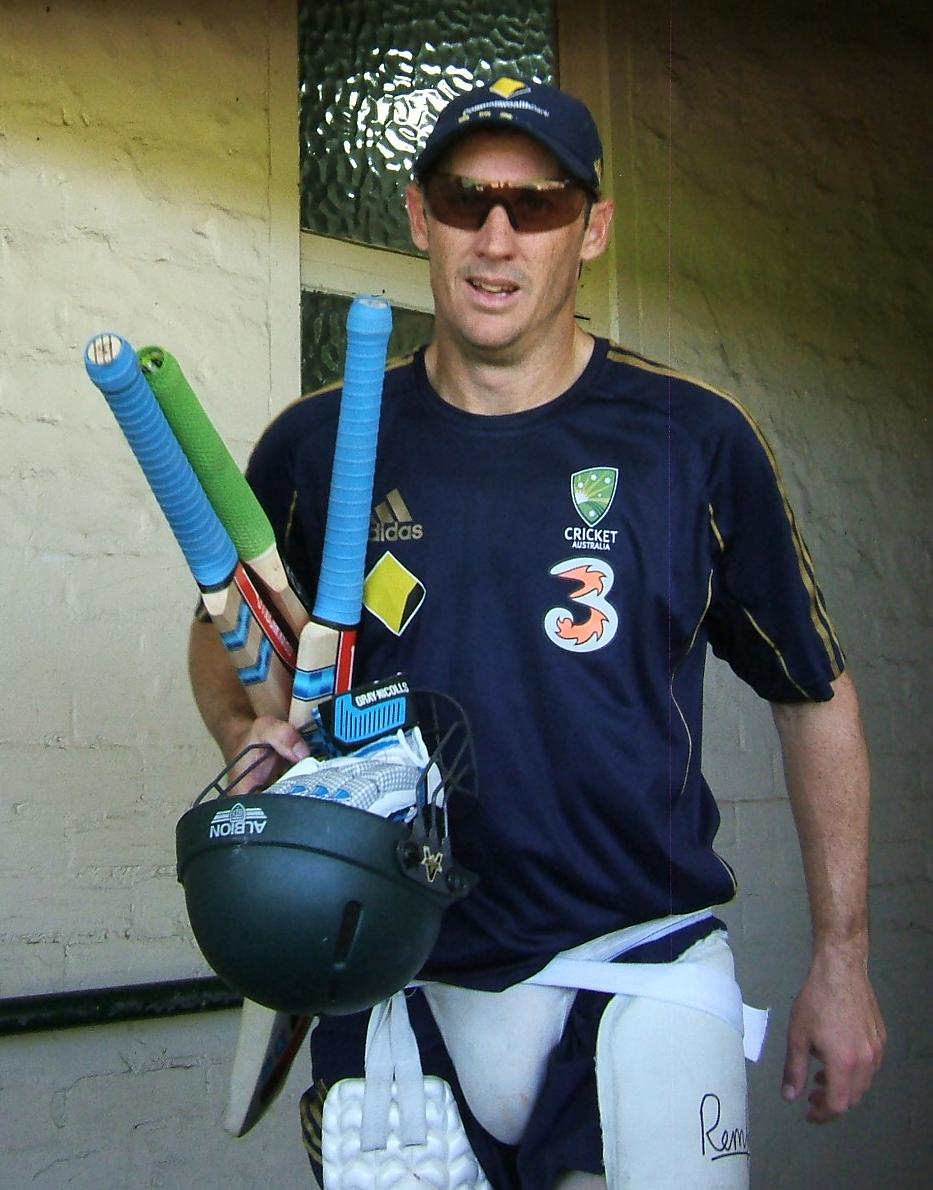
Hussey with Australia in 2009.

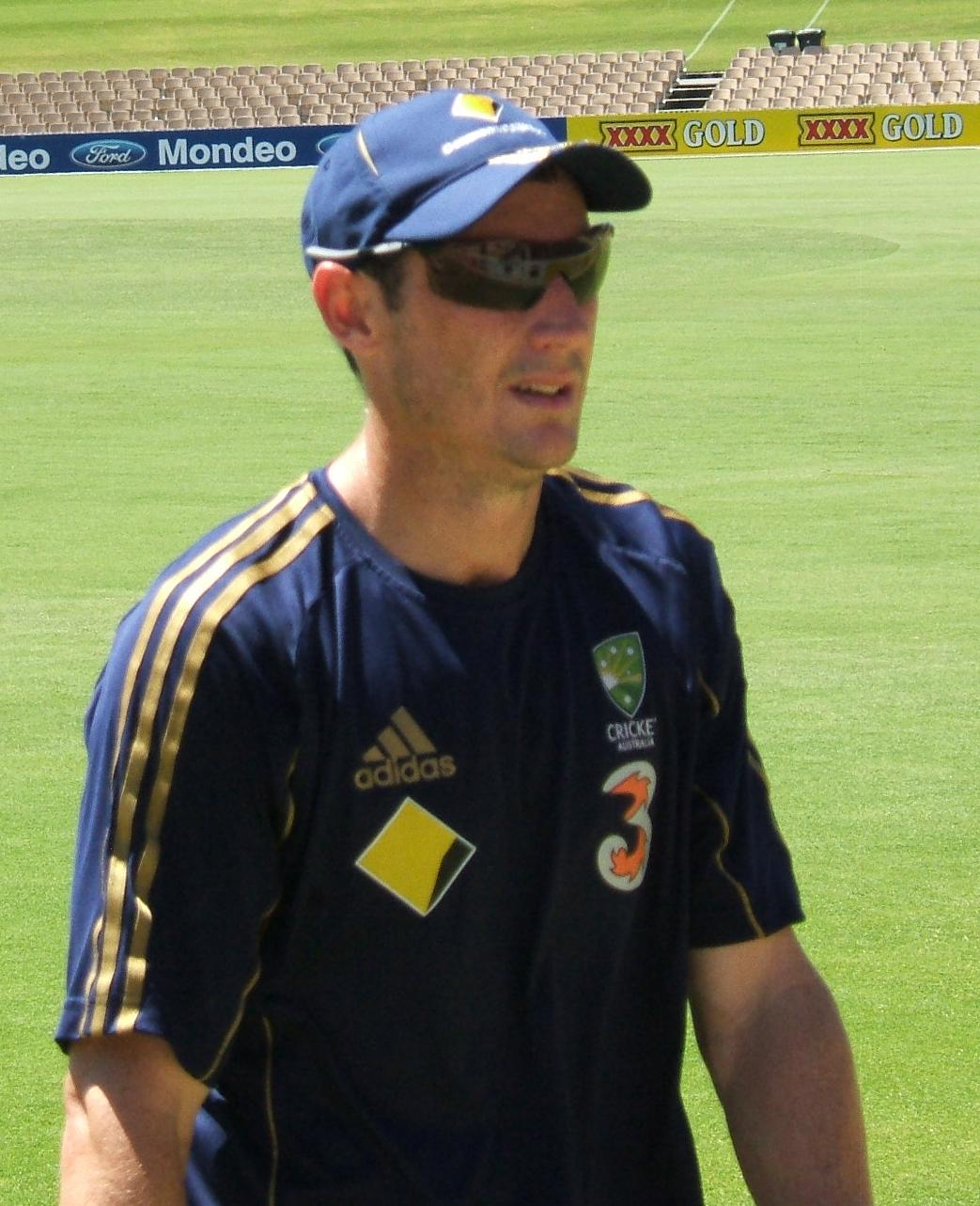
Hussey with Australia in 2009.

In 2004, Hussey played four one-day internationals (ODIs) for Australia A, scoring a century against the West Indies. In September 2007, David toured Pakistan with the Australia A team, scoring two centuries on the tour. Hussey made his international Twenty20 debut for Australia against India at the MCG on 1 February 2008. Although he was not required to bat, he took a wicket and a catch.

Hussey's international representative career continued with selection for the ODI tour of the West Indies in the Australian off-season of 2008. He made his debut at Basseterre on 4 July 2008 in the fourth ODI of the bilateral series against the West Indies and scored 52, involved in a 50 partnership with brother Michael. In the fifth ODI, he created a new record for Australia when he struck a half century off just 19 balls. Incidentally, earlier in the same match, wicket keeper Luke Ronchi scored his half century off just 21 balls only to see it eclipsed by Hussey minutes later.

On 28 August 2009, Hussey registered his maiden ODI century against Scotland getting 111 off 87 balls. Nevertheless, although he represented Australia in a number of T20 International matches during 2010, Hussey did not play another one day international after scoring his century against Scotland until he was selected for the 1st ODI against England at the MCG on 16 January 2011. During England's innings, Hussey took figures of 2/42 off six overs with the ball, but was not required to bat during Australia's successful run chase. On 23 January 2011 in the third ODI match in a series against England, he scored 68* to take Australia to victory and a 3–0 series lead over England with four games to play. On 6 February 2011 he scored 60 in the 3rd ODI match against England as Australia completed a resounding 6–1 series win at the WACA in Perth.

Despite his exemplary first class average of 55.27 (as of the end of the 2010/11 season), Hussey has never been selected to play a test match for Australia. Outside of India, Hussey is the only batsman to average more than 54 at first class level, but never be selected for a test.

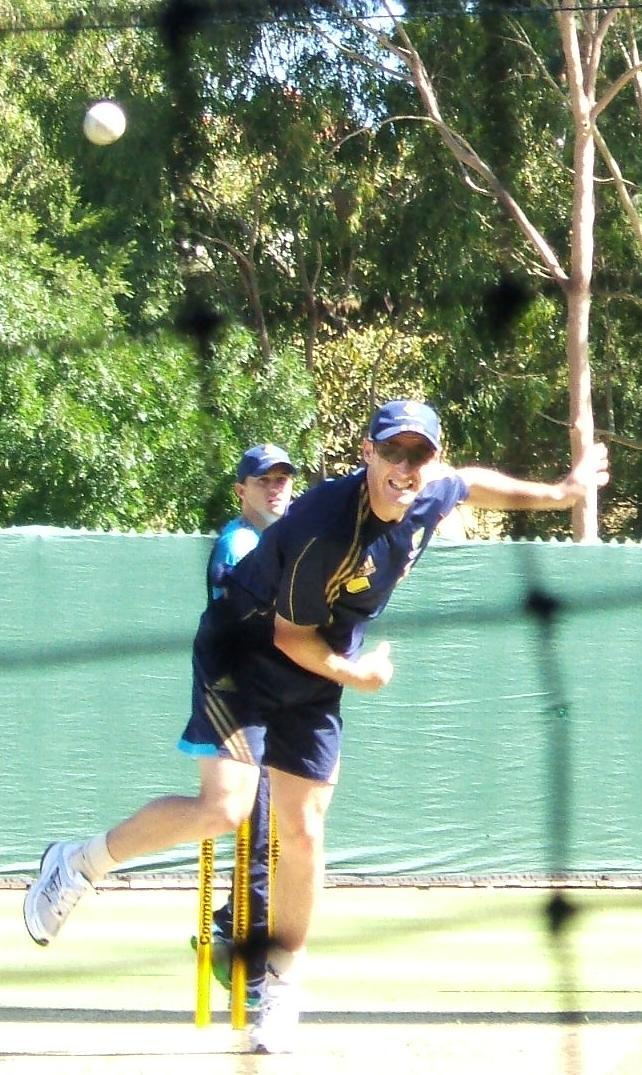
Hussey bowling off spin in the Adelaide Oval nets.

In the 2011–2012 tri-series held in Australia against India and Sri Lanka, Hussey scored the third most runs between the three teams, making 439 runs with an average 54.88.

== Indian Premier League ==
Hussey was selected for Kolkata Knight Riders in the Indian Premier League to a contract of $625,000. He had a successful first series, scoring 319 runs at 29.00, he received a man of the match award against Deccan Chargers after scoring 38 not out on a difficult pitch to win the match for his side.

In the fourth season, Hussey attracted the biggest price for an Australian on the opening day of the two-day auction at Bangalore and was contracted by Kings XI Punjab for US$1.4 million. He is currently the second-most-expensive overseas IPL cricketer, after Mahela Jayawardene.

In the 2012 Indian Premier League, due to the absence of injured Kings XI Punjab captain Adam Gilchrist, Hussey was the skipper of Kings XI until Gilchrist returned.

Hussey represented Chennai Super Kings for the IPL 2014. He was the replacement for the injured Dwayne Bravo.

Hussey was appointed as the chief mentor for Kolkata Knight Riders in the 2019 IPL.

== Career best performances ==
	Batting			
	Score	Fixture	Venue	Season
ODI	111	Scotland v Australia	The Grange, Edinburgh	2009
T20I	88*	South Africa v Australia	Wanderers Stadium, Johannesburg	2009
FC	275	Nottinghamshire v Essex	Trent Bridge, Nottinghamshire	2007
LA	140*	New South Wales v Victoria	North Sydney Oval, Sydney	2012
T20	100*	Tasmania v Victoria	Bellerive Oval, Hobart	2008
