= 2020–21 Melbourne Renegades season =

Melbourne Renegades
2020–21 season
- Coach: Michael Klinger
- Captain(s): Aaron Finch
- Home ground: Marvel Stadium (Capacity: 47,000); Blundstone Arena (Capacity: 20,000); Metricon Stadium (Capacity: 21,000); Adelaide Oval (Capacity: 55,317); Melbourne Cricket Ground (Capacity: 100,024)
- BBL Season: 8th
- BBL Finals: DNQ
- Leading Run Scorer: Sam Harper (351)
- Leading Wicket Taker: Peter Hatzoglou (17)
- Player of the Season: Sam Harper

The 2020–21 Melbourne Renegades season was the tenth in the club's history. Coached by Michael Klinger and captained by Aaron Finch, they competed in the BBL's 2020–21 season.

== Standings ==
Pos	Team	Pld	W	L	NR	BP	Pts	NRR	Qualification
1	Sydney Sixers (C)	14	9	5	0	9	36	0.257	Advanced to play-off phase
2	Perth Scorchers	14	8	5	1	6	32	0.851	Advanced to play-off phase
3	Sydney Thunder	14	8	6	0	7	31	0.949	Advanced to play-off phase
4	Brisbane Heat	14	7	7	0	8	29	−0.286	Advanced to play-off phase
5	Adelaide Strikers	14	7	7	0	7	28	0.105	Advanced to play-off phase
6	Hobart Hurricanes	14	7	7	0	7	28	−0.187	
7	Melbourne Stars	14	5	8	1	7	24	0.140	
8	Melbourne Renegades	14	4	10	0	4	16	−1.727	

Source: ESPNcricinfo
(C) Champions

== Fixtures and results ==
Match 4
12 December 2020
19:15 (N)
Scorecard

Perth Scorchers; 130 (19.1 overs)	v	Melbourne Renegades (H); 3/131 (16.3 overs)
Aaron Hardie 33 (36); Kane Richardson 3/22 (3.1 overs)		Shaun Marsh 62 (47); Jhye Richardson 2/20 (3.3 overs)

Melbourne Renegades won by 7 wickets
Blundstone Arena, Hobart
Attendance: 1,119
Umpires: Michael Graham-Smith and Donovan Koch
Player of the match: Josh Lalor (Melbourne Renegades)

- Perth Scorchers won the toss and elected to bat.
- Jake Fraser-McGurk and Peter Hatzoglou (Melbourne Renegades) both made their T20 debuts.

Match 6
13 December 2020
19:15 (N)
Scorecard

(H) Sydney Sixers; 4/205 (20 overs)	v	Melbourne Renegades; 60 (10.4 overs)
Josh Philippe 95 (57); Peter Hatzoglou 2/40 (4 overs)		Jake Fraser-McGurk 13 (10); Kane Richardson 13 (10); Ben Dwarshuis 4/13 (2.4 overs)

Sydney Sixers won by 145 runs
Blundstone Arena, Hobart
Attendance: 3,807
Umpires: Michael Graham-Smith and Donovan Koch
Player of the match: Josh Philippe (Sydney Sixers)

- Melbourne Renegades won the toss and elected to field.
- The Melbourne Renegades total of 60 was the second-lowest score in the BBL.
- The Sydney Sixers' winning margin of 145 runs was the largest in a BBL match.

Match 10
19 December 2020
11:10
Scorecard

Melbourne Renegades; 5/157 (20 overs)	v	Hobart Hurricanes (H); 4/161 (17.4 overs)
Sam Harper 66* (52); Scott Boland 2/19 (4 overs)		Ben McDermott 89* (55); Noor Ahmad 1/27 (4 overs)

Hobart Hurricanes won by 6 wickets
Blundstone Arena, Hobart
Attendance: 3,877
Umpires: Darren Close and Paul Wilson
Player of the match: Ben McDermott (Hobart Hurricanes)

- Hobart Hurricanes won the toss and elected to field.
- X-factor subs: Mackenzie Harvey (Melbourne Renegades) replaced Peter Hatzoglou.

Match 14
26 December 2020
18:10 (N)
Scorecard

(H) Sydney Thunder; 8/209 (20 overs)	v	Melbourne Renegades; 80 (12.2 overs)
Oliver Davies 48 (23); Kane Richardson 2/33 (4 overs)		Aaron Finch 20 (17); Tanveer Sangha 4/14 (3.2 overs)

Sydney Thunder won by 129 runs
Manuka Oval, Canberra
Attendance: 4,300
Umpires: Nathan Johnstone and Donovan Koch
Player of the match: Oliver Davies (Sydney Thunder)

- Melbourne Renegades won the toss and elected to field.

Match 18
29 December 2020
17:10 (D/N)
Scorecard

(H) Melbourne Renegades; 6/168 (20 overs)	v	Sydney Sixers; 8/169 (19.5 overs)
Shaun Marsh 67 (48); Dan Christian 2/19 (3 overs)		Josh Philippe 48 (30); Mohammad Nabi 2/11 (2 overs)

Sydney Sixers won by 2 wickets
Metricon Stadium, Gold Coast
Attendance: 3,375
Umpires: Phillip Gillespie and Tony Wilds
Player of the match: Jason Holder (Sydney Sixers)

- Melbourne Renegades won the toss and elected to bat.

Match 22
1 January 2021
19:15 (N)
Scorecard

(H) Melbourne Renegades; 6/166 (17 overs)	v	Sydney Thunder; 2/117 (12 overs)
Shaun Marsh 87 (48); Nathan McAndrew 3/41 (4 overs)		Usman Khawaja 48* (34); Mitchell Perry 1/33 (2 overs)

Sydney Thunder won by 7 runs (DLS method)
Metricon Stadium, Gold Coast
Attendance: 2,707
Umpires: Phillip Gillespie and David Taylor
Player of the match: Alex Hales (Sydney Thunder)

- Sydney Thunder won the toss and elected to field.
- Sydney Thunder were set a revised target of 173 runs from 17 overs due to rain. Rain prevented further play and Thunder were 7 runs above the DLS par score.
- Mitchell Perry (Melbourne Renegades) made his T20 debut.

Match 25
3 January 2021
16:05 (D/N)
Scorecard

(H) Perth Scorchers; 3/185 (20 overs)	v	Melbourne Renegades; 89 (12.5 overs)
Josh Inglis 72* (41); Jack Prestwidge 2/32 (4 overs)		Jack Prestwidge 33 (24); Fawad Ahmed 2/5 (2.5 overs)

Perth Scorchers won by 96 runs
Optus Stadium, Perth
Attendance: 25,101
Umpires: Michael Graham-Smith and Simon Lightbody
Player of the match: Josh Inglis (Perth Scorchers)

- Melbourne Renegades won the toss and elected to field.

Match 29
5 January 2021
19:15 (N)
Scorecard

Adelaide Strikers; 5/171 (20 overs)	v	Melbourne Renegades (H); 111 (19.1 overs)
Jake Weatherald 51 (25); Imad Wasim 2/13 (3 overs)		Mackenzie Harvey 34 (29); Peter Siddle 3/16 (3.1 overs)

Adelaide Strikers won by 60 runs
Adelaide Oval, Adelaide
Attendance: 12,707
Umpires: Darren Close and Sam Nogajski
Player of the match: Ryan Gibson (Adelaide Strikers)

- Adelaide Strikers won the toss and elected to bat.

Match 33
8 January 2021
18:10 (D/N)
Scorecard

(H) Adelaide Strikers; 7/177 (20 overs)	v	Melbourne Renegades; 4/178 (19.5 overs)
Phil Salt 59 (42); Peter Hatzoglou 3/43 (4 overs)		Mohammad Nabi 71* (41); Rashid Khan 2/24 (4 overs)

Melbourne Renegades won by 6 wickets
Adelaide Oval, Adelaide
Attendance: 14,609
Umpires: Darren Close and David Taylor
Player of the match: Mohammad Nabi (Melbourne Renegades)

- Adelaide Strikers won the toss and elected to bat.

Match 39
14 January 2021
19:15 (N)
Scorecard

Melbourne Renegades; 6/149 (20 overs)	v	Brisbane Heat (H); 5/150 (18.4 overs)
Beau Webster 50* (40); Mark Steketee 2/24 (4 overs)		Chris Lynn 50 (40); Peter Hatzoglou 2/28 (4 overs)

Brisbane Heat won by 5 wickets
Manuka Oval, Canberra
Closed Event
Umpires: Gerard Abood and Greg Davidson
Player of the match: Joe Burns (Brisbane Heat)

- Brisbane Heat won the toss and elected to field.
- X-factor subs: Morné Morkel (Brisbane Heat) replaced Xavier Bartlett.

Match 42
17 January 2021
19:15 (N)
Scorecard

Melbourne Renegades; 150 (19.5 overs)	v	Melbourne Stars (H); 4/153 (19.1 overs)
Sam Harper 63 (52); Liam Hatcher 3/29 (4 overs)		Nick Larkin 43 (32); Marcus Stoinis 43 (32); Kane Richardson 2/24 (4 overs)

Melbourne Stars won by 6 wickets
Melbourne Cricket Ground, Melbourne
Attendance: 14,979
Umpires: Shawn Craig and Donovan Koch
Player of the match: Liam Hatcher (Melbourne Stars)

- Melbourne Renegades won the toss and elected to bat.

Match 45
20 January 2021
19:15 (N)
Scorecard

Melbourne Stars; 6/158 (20 overs)	v	Melbourne Renegades (H); 5/160 (19.4 overs)
Nick Larkin 61* (47); Zak Evans 2/23 (4 overs)		Mackenzie Harvey 47* (21); Nathan Coulter-Nile 3/41 (4 overs)

Melbourne Renegades won by 5 wickets
Marvel Stadium, Melbourne
Attendance: 14,208
Umpires: Shawn Craig and Sam Nogajski
Player of the match: Mackenzie Harvey (Melbourne Renegades)

- Melbourne Stars won the toss and elected to bat.

Match 49
23 January 2021
16:05 (D/N)
Scorecard

Brisbane Heat; 5/173 (20 overs)	v	Melbourne Renegades (H); 147 (18.4 overs)
Chris Lynn 52 (30); Zak Evans 3/34 (3 overs)		Sam Harper 57 (32); Mark Steketee 3/41 (3.4 overs)

Brisbane Heat won by 26 runs
Marvel Stadium, Melbourne
Attendance: 5,691
Umpires: Donovan Koch and Sam Nogajski
Player of the match: Marnus Labuschagne (Brisbane Heat)

- Brisbane Heat won the toss and elected to bat.

Match 55
26 January 2021
15:50 (D/N)
Scorecard

(H) Melbourne Renegades; 5/150 (20 overs)	v	Hobart Hurricanes; 9/139 (20 overs)
Beau Webster 54* (35); Riley Meredith 3/22 (4 overs)		Dawid Malan 34 (36); Zak Evans 5/33 (4 overs)

Melbourne Renegades won by 11 runs
Melbourne Cricket Ground, Melbourne
Attendance: 14,888
Umpires: Darren Close and Michael Graham-Smith
Player of the match: Zak Evans (Melbourne Renegades)

- Hobart Hurricanes won the toss and elected to field.
- X-factor subs: Tim David (Hobart Hurricanes) replaced Nicholas Winter.

== Squad information ==
The following is the Renegades men squad for the 2020–21 Big Bash League season as of 30 January 2021.

S/N	Name	Nat.	Date of birth (age)	Batting style	Bowling style	Notes
Batsmen
5	Aaron Finch	Australia	17 November 1986 (age 38)	Right-handed	Slow left arm orthodox	Captain
23	Jake Fraser-McGurk	Australia	11 April 2002 (age 22)	Right-handed	Right arm leg break	
14	Marcus Harris	Australia	21 July 1992 (age 32)	Left-handed	Right arm off break	
3	Mackenzie Harvey	Australia	18 September 2000 (age 24)	Left-handed	Right arm medium-fast	
9	Shaun Marsh	Australia	9 July 1983 (age 36)	Left-handed	Slow left arm orthodox	
8	Rilee Rossouw	South Africa	9 October 1989 (age 31)	Left-handed	Right arm off break	Visa contract
All-rounders
7	Mohammad Nabi	Afghanistan	1 January 1985 (age 34)	Right-handed	Right arm off break	Visa contract
20	Beau Webster	Australia	1 December 1993 (age 25)	Right-handed	Right arm off break	
4	Imad Wasim	Pakistan	18 December 1988 (age 36)	Left-handed	Left-arm off break	Visa contract
12	Will Sutherland	Australia	27 October 1999 (age 25)	Right-handed	Right arm fast medium	
17	Benny Howell	England	5 October 1988 (age 36)	Right-handed	Right arm fast medium	Visa contract
61	Jack Prestwidge	Australia	28 February 1996 (age 24)	Right-handed	Right-arm medium fast	
Wicketkeepers
6	Sam Harper	Australia	10 December 1996 (age 28)	Right-handed	–	
Pace bowlers
–	Brody Couch	Australia	26 March 2000 (age 19)	Right-handed	Right-arm fast	
2	Zak Evans	Australia	26 March 2000 (age 19)	Right-handed	Right-arm fast	
16	Mitchell Perry	Australia	27 April 2000 (age 20)	Left-handed	Right-arm fast medium	
19	James Pattinson	Australia	3 May 1990 (age 34)	Right-handed	Right arm fast	
55	Kane Richardson	Australia	12 February 1991 (age 34)	Right-handed	Right arm fast medium	
11	Josh Lalor	Australia	5 December 1999 (age 21)	Left-handed	Right arm medium	
Spin bowlers
13	Cameron Boyce	Australia	27 July 1989 (age 35)	Right-handed	Right arm leg break	
41	Peter Hatzoglou	Australia	27 November 1998 (age 26)	Right-handed	Right arm leg break	
18	Jon Holland	Australia	29 May 1987 (age 32)	Right-handed	Slow left arm orthodox	
15	Noor Ahmad	Afghanistan	3 January 2005 (age 16)	Left-handed	Left arm wrist spin	Visa contract
99	Imran Tahir	South Africa	27 March 1979 (age 41)	Right-handed	Right arm legbreak	Visa contract, didn't make an appearance due to withdrawal

== Season statistics ==
=== Home attendance ===
Match No.	Opponent	Attendance
4	Perth Scorchers	1,119*
18	Sydney Sixers	3,375*
22	Sydney Thunder	2,707*
29	Adelaide Strikers	12,707*
45	Melbourne Stars	14,208
49	Brisbane Heat	5,691
55	Hobart Hurricanes	14,888
Total Attendance		54,695
Average Attendance		7,814
