= List of Melbourne Renegades records and statistics =

This is a list of Melbourne Renegades records and statistics in the Big Bash League, an Australian cricket series.

== Records ==
=== Team records ===
==== Result summary versus opponent ====
As of 26 December 2024

Domestic teams
Opposition	Pld	W	L	T	T+W	T+L	NR	%
Adelaide Strikers	19	8	11	0	0	0	0	42.10
Brisbane Heat	21	13	8	0	0	0	0	61.90
Hobart Hurricanes	20	9	11	0	0	0	0	45.00
Melbourne Stars	26	10	16	0	0	0	0	38.46
Perth Scorchers	21	4	16	0	0	0	1	20.00
Sydney Sixers	20	5	14	0	0	0	1	26.31
Sydney Thunder	17	10	7	0	0	0	0	58.82

==== Highest totals ====
As of 26 December 2024

Rank	Score	Inns	Overs	RR	Opposition	Ground	Season	Date
1	222/4	1st	20.0	11.10	Hobart Hurricanes	Docklands Stadium, Melbourne	BBL06	12 Jan 2017
2	210/3	1st	20.0	10.50	Brisbane Heat	Docklands Stadium, Melbourne	BBL04	30 Dec 2013
3	202/5	2nd	20.0	10.10	Perth Scorchers	Perth Stadium, Perth	BBL12	22 Jan 2023
4	199/5	1st	20.0	9.95	Brisbane Heat	The Gabba, Brisbane	BBL06	20 Jan 2017
5	189/6	1st	20.0	9.45	Sydney Thunder	Manuka Oval, Canberra	BBL07	24 Jan 2018

==== Lowest totals ====
As of 26 December 2024

Rank	Score	Inns	Overs	RR	Opposition	Ground	Tournament	Date
1	57	2nd	12.4	4.50	Melbourne Stars	Docklands Stadium, Melbourne	BBL04	3 Jan 2015
2	60	2nd	10.4	5.62	Sydney Sixers	Bellerive Oval, Hobart	BBL10	13 Dec 2020
3	80	2nd	12.2	6.48	Sydney Thunder	Manuka Oval, Canberra	BBL10	26 Dec 2020
3	80	2nd	14.2	5.58	Sydney Thunder	Docklands Stadium, Melbourne	BBL11	8 Jan 2022
5	89	2nd	12.5	6.93	Perth Scorchers	Perth Stadium, Perth	BBL10	3 Jan 2021

=== Batting records ===
==== Most runs ====
As of 26 December 2024

Batsman	Years	Mat	Inns	Runs
Aaron Finch	2011–2024	107	105	3311
Sam Harper	2018–2023	68	67	1433
Shaun Marsh	2019–2024	42	42	1375
Tom Cooper	2012–2020	71	62	1202
Cameron White	2015–2019	35	35	931

==== Highest individual scores ====
As of 26 December 2024

Batsman	Runs	BF	Opponent	Ground	Tournament	Date
Aaron Finch	111*	65	Melbourne Stars	Docklands Stadium, Melbourne	BBL02	7 Dec 2012
Aaron Finch	109	68	Sydney Sixers	SCG, Sydney	BBL09	25 Jan 2020
Alex Hales	89	52	Sydney Sixers	SCG, Sydney	BBL02	9 Jan 2013
Sam Harper	89	48	Hobart Hurricanes	Docklands Stadium, Melbourne	BBL12	7 Jan 2023
Shaun Marsh	87	48	Sydney Thunder	Carrara Stadium, Gold Coast	BBL10	1 Jan 2021
Nic Maddinson	87	49	Brisbane Heat	Cazalys Stadium, Cairns	BBL12	15 Dec 2022

==== Highest averages ====
Minimum 10 innings

As of 26 December 2024

Batsman	Years	Mat	Inns	Ave
Brad Hodge	2011–2018	12	10	43.00
Aaron Finch	2011–2024	107	105	34.48
Cameron White	2015–2019	35	35	34.48
Shaun Marsh	2019–2024	42	42	34.37
Tom Beaton	2015–2016	12	11	32.33

==== Highest strike rates ====
Minimum 250 balls faced

As of 26 December 2024

Batsman	Years	SR	Runs	BF
Dwayne Bravo	2014–2018	141.86	471	332
Sam Harper	2018–2023	133.55	1433	1073
Ben Rohrer	2012–2015	133.51	498	373
Will Sutherland	2018–2024	132.07	490	371
Aaron Finch	2011–2024	131.12	3311	2525

==== Most fifties ====
As of 26 December 2024

Batsman	Years	Mat	Inns	50+
Aaron Finch	2011–2024	107	105	28
Shaun Marsh	2019–2024	42	42	13
Sam Harper	2018–2023	68	67	10
Cameron White	2015–2019	35	35	7
Tom Cooper	2012–2020	71	62	6

==== Most sixes ====
As of 26 December 2024

Batsman	Years	Mat	Inns	6s
Aaron Finch	2011–2024	107	105	118
Sam Harper	2018–2023	68	67	52
Shaun Marsh	2019–2024	42	42	41
Tom Cooper	2012–2020	71	62	38
Cameron White	2015–2019	35	35	32

=== Bowling records ===
==== Most wickets ====
As of 26 December 2024

Bowler	Seasons	Mat	Wickets
Kane Richardson	2017–2024	76	100
Cameron Boyce	2018–2022	34	40
Tom Rogers	2022–2024	27	38
Nathan Rimmington	2012–2017	35	34
Will Sutherland	2018–2024	56	33

==== Best bowling figures ====
As of 26 December 2024

Bowler	Ovr	BBI	Opposition	Ground	Tournament	Date
Tom Rogers	4.0	5/16	Melbourne Stars	MCG, Melbourne	BBL12	3 Jan 2023
Cameron Boyce	4.0	5/21	Sydney Thunder	MCG, Melbourne	BBL11	19 Jan 2022
Dwayne Bravo	4.0	5/28	Hobart Hurricanes	Blundstone Arena, Hobart	BBL07	21 Dec 2017
Zak Evans	4.0	5/33	Hobart Hurricanes	MCG, Melbourne	BBL10	26 Jan 2021
Shakib Al Hasan	4.0	4/13	Brisbane Heat	Docklands Stadium, Melbourne	BBL04	13 Jan 2015

==== Best averages ====
Minimum 10 wickets

As of 26 December 2024

Bowler	Years	Mat	Wickets	Ave
Akeal Hosein	2022–2024	10	15	16.26
Muttiah Muralitharan	2012–2014	16	19	18.31
Sunil Narine	2016–2017	8	13	19.23
Shahid Afridi	2011–2012	7	10	20.80
Tom Rogers	2022–2024	21	34	21.31

==== Best economy rates ====
Minimum 150 balls

As of 26 December 2024

Bowler	Years	Mat	Econ
Muttiah Muralitharan	2012–2014	16	5.70
Usman Khan Shinwari	2018–2019	7	6.14
Akeal Hosein	2022–2024	10	6.25
Cameron Boyce	2018–2022	34	6.85
Fawad Ahmed	2013–2023	13	6.87

=== Partnerships ===
==== Highest partnerships by wicket ====
As of 26 December 2024

Wicket	Runs	Partners	Opposition	Ground	Date
1st	126	Aaron Finch & Brad Hodge	Hobart Hurricanes	Blundstone Arena, Hobart	18 Jan 2012
2nd	130	Aaron Finch & Nic Maddinson	Perth Scorchers	Docklands Stadium, Melbourne	22 Dec 2021
3rd	124*	Brad Hodge & Andrew McDonald	Sydney Sixers	Docklands Stadium, Melbourne	2 Jan 2012
4th	102	Tom Cooper & Aaron Finch	Melbourne Stars	Docklands Stadium, Melbourne	4 Jan 2014
5th	84	Aaron Finch & Will Sutherland	Perth Scorchers	Perth Stadium, Perth	22 Jan 2023
6th	94*	Daniel Christian & Mohammad Nabi	Adelaide Strikers	Adelaide Oval, Adelaide	23 Dec 2018
7th	41	Cameron Boyce & Daniel Christian	Sydney Sixers	Docklands Stadium, Melbourne	15 Feb 2019
8th	50*	Cameron Boyce & Kane Richardson	Sydney Thunder	Docklands Stadium, Melbourne	30 Jan 2019
9th	44	Cameron Gannon & Nathan Rimmington	Adelaide Strikers	Docklands Stadium, Melbourne	18 Jan 2016
10th	27*	Brad Hogg & Chris Tremain	Melbourne Stars	Docklands Stadium, Melbourne	7 Jan 2017
