= 2020–21 Big Bash League season =

Cricket tournament

2020–21 Big Bash League
- Dates: 10 December 2020 – 6 February 2021
- Administrator: Cricket Australia
- Cricket format: Twenty20
- Tournament format(s): Double round robin and Playoffs
- Champions: Sydney Sixers (3rd title)
- Participants: 8
- Matches: 61
- Attendance: 540,231 (8,856 per match)
- Player of the series: Josh Philippe (Sydney Sixers)
- Most runs: Alex Hales (Sydney Thunder) (543)
- Most wickets: Jhye Richardson (Perth Scorchers) (29)
- Official website: bigbash.com.au

The 2020–21 Big Bash League season or BBL|10 was the tenth season of the Big Bash League, the professional men's Twenty20 domestic cricket competition in Australia. On 15 July 2020, Cricket Australia confirmed the fixtures for the tournament, with the first match taking place on 10 December 2020 and the final on 6 February 2021 The majority of the matches played at night.

Sydney Sixers were the defending champions. They successfully defended their title following a 27-run victory over Perth Scorchers in the final.

== New rules ==
Several changes for the season, including bonus points, substitutions and free hits for wides, were suggested by Cricket Australia. On 16 November three changes were announced to the league's playing conditions to add a more strategic element to the tournament.

The "Power Surge", a two-over period during which the fielding team is allowed only two players outside the inner fielding circle, was introduced. The batting side could call for this at any point after the 11th over of their innings. The fielding restrictions replicate those of the usual Powerplay at the beginning of an innings, which was shortened to four overs.

An "X-factor Player", named as either the 12th or 13th player on the team sheet, was also introduced. This player could enter a game at any point after the 10th over of the first innings as a replacement for any player who was yet to bat or had bowled no more than one over. The rule was first used in the eighth match, Adelaide Strikers replacing Danny Briggs with Matthew Short, and Hobart Hurricanes replacing Johan Botha with Mac Wright.

The points awarded for a win was increased to three, with a "Bash Boost" bonus point awarded halfway through the second innings. The team batting received the point if they were above the equivalent 10-over score of their opposition, and the bolding team receiving it if the batting had not reached the mark. If the score at the 10-over mark was equal, both teams received 0.5 point each. In case of a no result, both teams received two standard points and no Bash Boost was awarded. If a match was shortened before a ball was bowled, the midway point of the innings is recalculated and points are given as normal. If a match is impacted by rain and is shortened, the Bash Boost target was calculated via the Duckworth–Lewis–Stern method.

== Teams ==
Team	Home Ground*	Capacity	Captain	Coach
Adelaide Strikers	Adelaide Oval; Blundstone Arena*; Metricon Stadium*	55,317; 19,500; 21,000	Travis Head	Jason Gillespie
Brisbane Heat	The Gabba; Metricon Stadium	42,000; 21,000	Chris Lynn and Jimmy Peirson	Darren Lehmann
Hobart Hurricanes	Blundstone Arena; UTAS Stadium; The Gabba*	19,500; 15,500; 42,000	Peter Handscomb and Matthew Wade	Adam Griffith
Melbourne Renegades	Marvel Stadium; Kardinia Park; Blundstone Arena*; Metricon Stadium*; Melbourne Cricket Ground*	47,000; 36,000; 19,500; 21,000; 100,024	Aaron Finch	Michael Klinger
Melbourne Stars	Melbourne Cricket Ground; Metricon Stadium; Junction Oval; Manuka Oval*	100,024; 21,000; 7,000; 12,000	Glenn Maxwell	David Hussey
Perth Scorchers	Optus Stadium; UTAS Stadium*; Adelaide Oval*; Manuka Oval*	60,000; 15,500; 55,317; 12,000	Ashton Turner	Adam Voges
Sydney Sixers	Sydney Cricket Ground; Coffs Harbour International Stadium; Blundstone Arena*; Metricon Stadium*; Manuka Oval*; Adelaide Oval*	48,601; 20,000; 19,500; 21,000; 12,000; 55,317	Moises Henriques and Daniel Hughes	Greg Shipperd
Sydney Thunder	Sydney Showground Stadium; Manuka Oval	22,000; 12,000	Callum Ferguson	Shane Bond

Due to the COVID-19 pandemic, teams will play 'home' games at neutral venues. These are marked with an *.

== League stage ==
On 23 November 2020, Cricket Australia confirmed the full schedule for the tournament. 45 of the 61 games – including all the finals – were shown on Channel Seven, whilst Fox Cricket and Kayo Sports broadcast all of the matches. On 5 November 2020, Cricket Australia announced the revised dates, start times and matchups for all 56 regular season games, with venues confirmed for the first 21 matches up until 31 December 2020.

=== Points table ===
Pos	Team	Pld	W	L	NR	BP	Pts	NRR	Qualification
1	Sydney Sixers (C)	14	9	5	0	9	36	0.257	Advanced to play-off phase
2	Perth Scorchers	14	8	5	1	6	32	0.851	Advanced to play-off phase
3	Sydney Thunder	14	8	6	0	7	31	0.949	Advanced to play-off phase
4	Brisbane Heat	14	7	7	0	8	29	−0.286	Advanced to play-off phase
5	Adelaide Strikers	14	7	7	0	7	28	0.105	Advanced to play-off phase
6	Hobart Hurricanes	14	7	7	0	7	28	−0.187	
7	Melbourne Stars	14	5	8	1	7	24	0.140	
8	Melbourne Renegades	14	4	10	0	4	16	−1.727	

Source: ESPNcricinfo
(C) Champions

=== Win–loss table ===
Below is a summary of results for each team's fourteen regular season matches, plus finals where applicable, in chronological order. A team's opponent for any given match is listed above the margin of victory/defeat.

Team vs	1	2	3	4	5	6	7	8	9	10	11	12	13	14
Adelaide Strikers (ADS)	HBH; 11 runs	HBH; 5 wickets	SYS; 38 runs	BRH; 2 runs	PRS; 71 runs	PRS; 7 wickets	SYS; 7 wickets	MLR; 60 runs	MLR; 6 wickets	MLS; 5 wickets	MLS; 111 runs	BRH; 82 runs	SYT; 6 runs	SYT; 9 wickets
Brisbane Heat (BRH)	MLS; 6 wickets	SYT; 4 wickets	ADS; 2 runs	HBH; 4 wickets	HBH; 1 run	SYS; 4 wickets	SYT; 5 wickets	MLS; 17 runs (DLS)	SYS; 3 wickets	MLR; 5 wickets	PRS; 59 runs	ADS; 82 runs	MLR; 26 runs	PRS; 6 runs
Hobart Hurricanes (HBH)	SYS; 16 runs	ADS; 11 runs	ADS; 5 wickets	MLR; 6 wickets	BRH; 4 wickets	BRH; 1 run	MLS; 21 runs	MLS; 10 runs	SYT; 39 runs	PRS; 9 wickets	SYT; 6 wickets	PRS; 22 runs	SYS; 7 runs	MLR; 11 runs
Melbourne Renegades (MLR)	PRS; 7 wickets	SYS; 145 runs	HBH; 6 wickets	SYT; 129 runs	SYS; 2 wickets	SYT; 7 runs (DLS)	PRS; 96 runs	ADS; 60 runs	ADS; 6 wickets	BRH; 5 wickets	MLS; 6 wickets	MLS; 5 wickets	BRH; 26 runs	HBH; 11 runs
Melbourne Stars (MLS)	BRH; 6 wickets	SYT; 22 runs	PRS; No result	SYS; 1 wicket	SYT; 75 runs	HBH; 21 runs	HBH; 10 runs	BRH; 17 runs (DLS)	ADS; 5 wickets	ADS; 111 runs	MLR; 6 wickets	MLR; 5 wickets	PRS; 11 runs	SYS; 5 wickets
Perth Scorchers (PRS)	MLR; 7 wickets	MLS; No result	SYT; 7 wickets	ADS; 71 runs	ADS; 7 wickets	MLR; 96 runs	SYS; 86 runs	SYT; 17 runs	HBH; 9 wickets	SYS; 7 wickets	BRH; 59 runs	HBH; 22 runs	MLS; 11 runs	BRH; 6 runs
Sydney Sixers (SYS)	HBH; 16 runs	MLR; 145 runs	ADS; 38 runs	MLS; 1 wicket	MLR; 2 wickets	BRH; 4 wickets	ADS; 7 wickets	PRS; 86 runs	BRH; 3 wickets	SYT; 5 wickets (DLS)	PRS; 7 wickets	SYT; 46 runs	HBH; 7 runs	MLS; 5 wickets
Sydney Thunder (SYT)	MLS; 22 runs	BRH; 4 wickets	PRS; 7 wickets	MLR; 129 runs	MLS; 75 runs	MLR; 7 runs (DLS)	BRH; 5 wickets	HBH; 39 runs	PRS; 17 runs	SYS; 5 wickets (DLS)	HBH; 6 wickets	SYS; 46 runs	ADS; 6 runs	ADS; 9 wickets

Team's results→	Won	Lost	N/R

Last updated: 20 February 2021

=== Match summary ===
Visitor team →	ADS	BRH	HBH	MLR	MLS	PRS	SYS	SYT
Home team ↓	ADS	BRH	HBH	MLR	MLS	PRS	SYS	SYT
Adelaide Strikers		Strikers; 82 runs	Strikers; 5 wickets	Strikers; 60 runs	Strikers; 5 wickets	Strikers; 71 runs	Sixers; 7 wickets	Strikers; 6 runs
Brisbane Heat	Strikers; 2 runs		Heat; 4 wickets	Heat; 5 wickets	Stars; 6 wickets	Heat; 6 runs	Heat; 4 wickets	Heat; 5 wickets
Hobart Hurricanes	Hurricanes; 11 runs	Hurricanes; 1 run		Hurricanes; 6 wickets	Hurricanes; 21 runs	Scorchers; 22 runs	Hurricanes; 16 runs	Hurricanes; 6 wickets
Melbourne Renegades	Renegades; 6 wickets	Heat; 26 runs	Renegades; 11 runs		Renegades; 5 wickets	Renegades; 7 wickets	Sixers; 2 wickets	Thunder; 7 runs
Melbourne Stars	Stars; 111 runs	Heat; 17 runs	Stars; 10 runs	Stars; 6 wickets		Scorchers; 11 runs	Sixers; 1 wicket	Thunder; 75 runs
Perth Scorchers	Scorchers; 7 wickets	Scorchers; 59 runs	Scorchers; 9 wickets	Scorchers; 96 runs	Match abandoned		Scorchers; 86 runs	Scorchers; 17 runs
Sydney Sixers	Sixers; 38 runs	Heat; 3 runs	Sixers; 7 runs	Sixers; 145 runs	Sixers; 5 wickets	Sixers; 7 wickets		Thunder; 46 runs
Sydney Thunder	Thunder; 9 wickets	Thunder; 4 wickets	Thunder; 39 runs	Thunder; 129 runs	Stars; 22 runs	Thunder; 7 wickets	Sixers; 5 wickets	

Home team won	Visitor team won

- Note: Results listed are according to the home (horizontal) and visitor (vertical) teams.
- Note: Click on a result to see a summary of the match.

=== Matches ===
Match 1
10 December 2020
19:15 (N)
Scorecard

Hobart Hurricanes; 8/178 (20 overs)	v	Sydney Sixers; 6/162 (20 overs)
Tim David 58 (33); Dan Christian 3/36 (4 overs)		James Vince 67 (41); James Faulkner 2/22 (4 overs)

Hobart Hurricanes won by 16 runs
Blundstone Arena, Hobart
Attendance: 3,791
Umpires: Sam Nogajski and Paul Wilson
Player of the match: Tim David (Hobart Hurricanes)

- Sydney Sixers won the toss and elected to field.

Match 2
11 December 2020
19:15 (N)
Scorecard

Brisbane Heat; 125 (19.5 overs)	v	Melbourne Stars; 4/129 (17.1 overs)
Tom Cooper 26 (24); Nathan Coulter-Nile 4/10 (3.5 overs)		Glenn Maxwell 46 (26); Jack Wood 2/28 (3 overs)

Melbourne Stars won by 6 wickets
Manuka Oval, Canberra
Attendance: 2,471
Umpires: Shawn Craig and Phillip Gillespie
Player of the match: Nathan Coulter-Nile (Melbourne Stars)

- Melbourne Stars won the toss and elected to field.
- Xavier Bartlett and Jack Wood (Brisbane Heat) both made their T20 debuts.

Match 3
12 December 2020
16:05 (D/N)
Scorecard

Melbourne Stars; 8/169 (20 overs)	v	Sydney Thunder; 9/147 (20 overs)
Marcus Stoinis 61 (37); Daniel Sams 2/24 (3 overs)		Callum Ferguson 54 (35); Liam Hatcher 3/28 (4 overs)

Melbourne Stars won by 22 runs
Manuka Oval, Canberra
Attendance: 3,295
Umpires: Greg Davidson and Phillip Gillespie
Player of the match: Adam Zampa (Melbourne Stars)

- Melbourne Stars won the toss and elected to bat.
- Liam Hatcher (Melbourne Stars) and Tanveer Sangha (Sydney Thunder) both made their T20 debuts.

Match 4
12 December 2020
19:15 (N)
Scorecard

Perth Scorchers; 130 (19.1 overs)	v	Melbourne Renegades; 3/131 (16.3 overs)
Aaron Hardie 33 (36); Kane Richardson 3/22 (3.1 overs)		Shaun Marsh 62 (47); Jhye Richardson 2/20 (3.3 overs)

Melbourne Renegades won by 7 wickets
Blundstone Arena, Hobart
Attendance: 1,119
Umpires: Michael Graham-Smith and Donovan Koch
Player of the match: Josh Lalor (Melbourne Renegades)

- Perth Scorchers won the toss and elected to bat.
- Jake Fraser-McGurk and Peter Hatzoglou (Melbourne Renegades) both made their T20 debuts.

Match 5
13 December 2020
14:15
Scorecard

Hobart Hurricanes; 5/174 (20 overs)	v	Adelaide Strikers; 9/163 (20 overs)
D'Arcy Short 72 (48); Wes Agar 2/28 (4 overs)		Daniel Worrall 62* (39); James Faulkner 3/21 (4 overs)

Hobart Hurricanes won by 11 runs
Blundstone Arena, Hobart
Attendance: 3,807
Umpires: Darren Close and Nathan Johnstone
Player of the match: D'Arcy Short (Hobart Hurricanes)

- Adelaide Strikers won the toss and elected to field.
- Daniel Worrall (Adelaide Strikers) made the highest score by a number 8 batsman in the BBL. His 10th wicket partnership with Danny Briggs for 61 runs was the highest 10th wicket partnership in the BBL.

Match 6
13 December 2020
19:15 (N)
Scorecard

Sydney Sixers; 4/205 (20 overs)	v	Melbourne Renegades; 60 (10.4 overs)
Josh Philippe 95 (57); Peter Hatzoglou 2/40 (4 overs)		Jake Fraser-McGurk 13 (10); Kane Richardson 13 (10); Ben Dwarshuis 4/13 (2.4 overs)

Sydney Sixers won by 145 runs
Blundstone Arena, Hobart
Attendance: 3,807
Umpires: Michael Graham-Smith and Donovan Koch
Player of the match: Josh Philippe (Sydney Sixers)

- Melbourne Renegades won the toss and elected to field.
- The Melbourne Renegades total of 60 was the second-lowest score in the BBL.
- The Sydney Sixers' winning margin of 145 runs was the largest in a BBL match.

Match 7
14 December 2020
19:15 (N)
Scorecard

Brisbane Heat; 6/178 (20 overs)	v	Sydney Thunder; 6/180 (18.5 overs)
Chris Lynn 69 (44); Jonathan Cook 2/31 (4 overs)		Daniel Sams 65* (25); Jack Wildermuth 3/23 (4 overs)

Sydney Thunder won by 4 wickets
Manuka Oval, Canberra
Attendance: 2,828
Umpires: Shawn Craig and Greg Davidson
Player of the match: Daniel Sams (Sydney Thunder)

- Brisbane Heat won the toss and elected to bat.

Match 8
15 December 2020
19:15 (N)
Scorecard

Hobart Hurricanes; 146 (19.3 overs)	v	Adelaide Strikers; 5/147 (18.4 overs)
Ben McDermott 46 (33); Peter Siddle 5/16 (3.3 overs)		Jake Weatherald 68* (48); James Faulkner 2/35 (4 overs)

Adelaide Strikers won by 5 wickets
University of Tasmania Stadium, Launceston
Attendance: 4,235
Umpires: Donovan Koch and Paul Wilson
Player of the match: Peter Siddle (Adelaide Strikers)

- Adelaide Strikers won the toss and elected to field.
- X-factor subs: Matthew Short (Adelaide Strikers) replaced Danny Briggs and Mac Wright (Hobart Hurricanes) replaced Johan Botha.

Match 9
16 December 2020
19:15 (N)
Scorecard

Perth Scorchers; 6/158 (17 overs)	v	Melbourne Stars; 1/10 (1.1 overs)
Colin Munro 49 (36); Nic Maddinson 2/8 (2 overs)		Andre Fletcher 6* (4); Jhye Richardson 1/0 (0.1 overs)

No result
University of Tasmania Stadium, Launceston
Attendance: 1,375
Umpires: Michael Graham-Smith and Sam Nogajski

- Melbourne Stars won the toss and elected to field.
- Rain stopped play during Perth Scorchers' innings. Melbourne Stars were set a revised target of 76 runs from 6 overs.
- X-factor subs: Ben Dunk (Melbourne Stars) replaced Tom O'Connell.

Match 10
19 December 2020
11:10
Scorecard

Melbourne Renegades; 5/157 (20 overs)	v	Hobart Hurricanes; 4/161 (17.4 overs)
Sam Harper 66* (52); Scott Boland 2/19 (4 overs)		Ben McDermott 89* (55); Noor Ahmad 1/27 (4 overs)

Hobart Hurricanes won by 6 wickets
Blundstone Arena, Hobart
Attendance: 3,877
Umpires: Darren Close and Paul Wilson
Player of the match: Ben McDermott (Hobart Hurricanes)

- Hobart Hurricanes won the toss and elected to field.
- X-factor subs: Mackenzie Harvey (Melbourne Renegades) replaced Peter Hatzoglou.

Match 11
20 December 2020
19:15 (N)
Scorecard

Sydney Sixers; 5/177 (20 overs)	v	Adelaide Strikers; 7/139 (20 overs)
Dan Christian 50 (16); Daniel Worrall 2/12 (4 overs)		Jonathan Wells 36* (38); Steve O'Keefe 2/8 (2 overs)

Sydney Sixers won by 38 runs
Blundstone Arena, Hobart
Attendance: 903
Umpires: Michael Graham-Smith and Sam Nogajski
Player of the match: Dan Christian (Sydney Sixers)

- Adelaide Strikers won the toss and elected to field.
- Liam Scott (Adelaide Strikers) made his T20 debut.
- X-factor subs: Liam Scott (Adelaide Strikers) replaced Danny Briggs.
- Liam Scott (Adelaide Strikers) became the first player to make his T20 debut as a substitute.

Match 12
22 December 2020
19:15 (N)
Scorecard

Perth Scorchers; 5/152 (20 overs)	v	Sydney Thunder; 3/156 (19.3 overs)
Mitchell Marsh 52* (41); Ben Cutting 1/16 (3 overs)		Callum Ferguson 61* (53); Jason Behrendorff 1/32 (4 overs)

Sydney Thunder won by 7 wickets
Manuka Oval, Canberra
Attendance: 4,039
Umpires: Donovan Koch and Simon Lightbody
Player of the match: Callum Ferguson (Sydney Thunder)

- Sydney Thunder won the toss and elected to field.
- Oliver Davies (Sydney Thunder) made his T20 debut.

Match 13
23 December 2020
18:15 (N)
Scorecard

Adelaide Strikers; 6/150 (20 overs)	v	Brisbane Heat; 9/148 (20 overs)
Matt Renshaw 32 (28); Xavier Bartlett 3/24 (4 overs)		Jimmy Peirson 69* (36); Danny Briggs 3/20 (4 overs)

Adelaide Strikers won by 2 runs
The Gabba, Brisbane
Attendance: 16,878
Umpires: David Taylor and Tony Wilds
Player of the match: Jimmy Peirson (Brisbane Heat)

- Brisbane Heat won the toss and elected to field.

Match 14
26 December 2020
18:10 (N)
Scorecard

Sydney Thunder; 8/209 (20 overs)	v	Melbourne Renegades; 80 (12.2 overs)
Oliver Davies 48 (23); Kane Richardson 2/33 (4 overs)		Aaron Finch 20 (17); Tanveer Sangha 4/14 (3.2 overs)

Sydney Thunder won by 129 runs
Manuka Oval, Canberra
Attendance: 4,300
Umpires: Nathan Johnstone and Donovan Koch
Player of the match: Oliver Davies (Sydney Thunder)

- Melbourne Renegades won the toss and elected to field.

Match 15
26 December 2020
20:20 (N)
Scorecard

Melbourne Stars; 5/193 (20 overs)	v	Sydney Sixers; 9/194 (19.5 overs)
Glenn Maxwell 71* (47); Steve O'Keefe 2/13 (2 overs)		Daniel Hughes 96 (51); Liam Hatcher 3/33 (4 overs)

Sydney Sixers won by 1 wicket
Metricon Stadium, Gold Coast
Attendance: 2,549
Umpires: Phillip Gillespie and Sam Nogajski
Player of the match: Daniel Hughes (Sydney Sixers)

- Sydney Sixers won the toss and elected to field.
- X-factor subs: Gurinder Sandhu (Sydney Sixers) replaced Ben Manenti.

Match 16
27 December 2020
18:15 (N)
Scorecard

Hobart Hurricanes; 7/148 (20 overs)	v	Brisbane Heat; 6/152 (17.2 overs)
D'Arcy Short 27 (20); Lewis Gregory 3/22 (4 overs)		Sam Heazlett 48 (27); D'Arcy Short 3/18 (4 overs)

Brisbane Heat won by 4 wickets
The Gabba, Brisbane
Attendance: 18,369
Umpires: Sam Nogajski and Tony Wilds
Player of the match: Lewis Gregory (Brisbane Heat)

- Brisbane Heat won the toss and elected to field.
- Wil Parker (Hobart Hurricanes) made his T20 debut.

Match 17
28 December 2020
18:45 (N)
Scorecard

Adelaide Strikers; 8/165 (20 overs)	v	Perth Scorchers; 94 (15.2 overs)
Phil Salt 51 (31); Jhye Richardson 3/30 (4 overs)		Liam Livingstone 22 (24); Danny Briggs 2/8 (3 overs)

Adelaide Strikers won by 71 runs
Adelaide Oval, Adelaide
Attendance: 17,840
Umpires: Darren Close and Sam Nogajski
Player of the match: Rashid Khan (Adelaide Strikers)

- Perth Scorchers won the toss and elected to field.

Match 18
29 December 2020
17:10 (D/N)
Scorecard

Melbourne Renegades; 6/168 (20 overs)	v	Sydney Sixers; 8/169 (19.5 overs)
Shaun Marsh 67 (48); Dan Christian 2/19 (3 overs)		Josh Philippe 48 (30); Mohammad Nabi 2/11 (2 overs)

Sydney Sixers won by 2 wickets
Metricon Stadium, Gold Coast
Attendance: 3,375
Umpires: Phillip Gillespie and Tony Wilds
Player of the match: Jason Holder (Sydney Sixers)

- Melbourne Renegades won the toss and elected to bat.

Match 19
29 December 2020
19:15 (N)
Scorecard

Sydney Thunder; 7/219 (20 overs)	v	Melbourne Stars; 144 (19.5 overs)
Alex Hales 71 (29); Adam Zampa 3/49 (4 overs)		Marcus Stoinis 27 (15); Chris Green 4/34 (4 overs)

Sydney Thunder won by 75 runs
Manuka Oval, Canberra
Attendance: 4,877
Umpires: Donovan Koch and Simon Lightbody
Player of the match: Alex Hales (Sydney Thunder)

- Melbourne Stars won the toss and elected to field.
- X-factor subs: Ben Dunk (Melbourne Stars) replaced Lance Morris.

Match 20
30 December 2020
18:15 (N)
Scorecard

Hobart Hurricanes; 150 (19.4 overs)	v	Brisbane Heat; 8/149 (20 overs)
Dawid Malan 39 (32); Mujeeb Ur Rahman 5/15 (4 overs)		James Bazley 49* (31); Riley Meredith 3/21 (4 overs)

Hobart Hurricanes won by 1 run
The Gabba, Brisbane
Attendance: 13,850
Umpires: Donovan Koch and Tony Wilds
Player of the match: Mujeeb Ur Rahman (Brisbane Heat)

- Brisbane Heat won the toss and elected to field.
- Mujeeb Ur Rahman (Brisbane Heat) took his first five-wicket haul in T20 cricket.

Match 21
31 December 2020
18:45 (N)
Scorecard

Adelaide Strikers; 9/146 (20 overs)	v	Perth Scorchers; 3/147 (17.4 overs)
Alex Carey 82 (59); Jhye Richardson 3/19 (4 overs)		Jason Roy 49 (32); Wes Agar 2/43 (4 overs)

Perth Scorchers won by 7 wickets
Adelaide Oval, Adelaide
Attendance: 21,636
Umpires: Darren Close and Michael Graham-Smith
Player of the match: Jhye Richardson (Perth Scorchers)

- Perth Scorchers won the toss and elected to field.

Match 22
1 January 2021
19:15 (N)
Scorecard

Melbourne Renegades; 6/166 (17 overs)	v	Sydney Thunder; 2/117 (12 overs)
Shaun Marsh 87 (48); Nathan McAndrew 3/41 (4 overs)		Usman Khawaja 48* (34); Mitchell Perry 1/33 (2 overs)

Sydney Thunder won by 7 runs (DLS method)
Metricon Stadium, Gold Coast
Attendance: 2,707
Umpires: Phillip Gillespie and David Taylor
Player of the match: Alex Hales (Sydney Thunder)

- Sydney Thunder won the toss and elected to field.
- Sydney Thunder were set a revised target of 173 runs from 17 overs due to rain. Rain prevented further play and Thunder were 7 runs above the DLS par score.
- Mitchell Perry (Melbourne Renegades) made his T20 debut.

Match 23
2 January 2021
17:05 (D/N)
Scorecard

Hobart Hurricanes; 5/164 (20 overs)	v	Melbourne Stars; 9/143 (20 overs)
Dawid Malan 75 (56); Billy Stanlake 3/25 (4 overs)		Glenn Maxwell 70 (37); Scott Boland 3/22 (4 overs)

Hobart Hurricanes won by 21 runs
Blundstone Arena, Hobart
Attendance: 5,892
Umpires: Gerard Abood and Nathan Johnstone
Player of the match: Scott Boland (Hobart Hurricanes)

- Melbourne Stars won the toss and elected to field.
- X-factor subs: Lance Morris (Melbourne Stars) replaced Nic Maddinson.

Match 24
2 January 2021
20:15 (N)
Scorecard

Sydney Sixers; 8/165 (20 overs)	v	Brisbane Heat; 6/171 (18.5 overs)
Josh Philippe 48 (36); Mark Steketee 4/33 (4 overs)		Max Bryant 40 (23); Dan Christian 2/35 (3 overs)

Brisbane Heat won by 4 wickets
The Gabba, Brisbane
Attendance: 16,946
Umpires: Greg Davidson and Phillip Gillespie
Player of the match: Mark Steketee (Brisbane Heat)

- Sydney Sixers won the toss and elected to bat.
- X-factor subs: Sam Heazlett (Brisbane Heat) replaced Matthew Kuhnemann.

Match 25
3 January 2021
16:05 (D/N)
Scorecard

Perth Scorchers; 3/185 (20 overs)	v	Melbourne Renegades; 89 (12.5 overs)
Josh Inglis 72* (41); Jack Prestwidge 2/32 (4 overs)		Jack Prestwidge 33 (24); Fawad Ahmed 2/5 (2.5 overs)

Perth Scorchers won by 96 runs
Optus Stadium, Perth
Attendance: 25,101
Umpires: Michael Graham-Smith and Simon Lightbody
Player of the match: Josh Inglis (Perth Scorchers)

- Melbourne Renegades won the toss and elected to field.

Match 26
3 January 2021
19:15 (N)
Scorecard

Adelaide Strikers; 4/150 (20 overs)	v	Sydney Sixers; 3/151 (18 overs)
Jonathan Wells 66 (56); Ben Dwarshuis 1/19 (3 overs)		James Vince 45* (33); Rashid Khan 3/18 (4 overs)

Sydney Sixers won by 7 wickets
Metricon Stadium, Gold Coast
Attendance: 3,012
Umpires: Greg Davidson and Tony Wilds
Player of the match: Josh Philippe (Sydney Sixers)

- Sydney Sixers won the toss and elected to field.

Match 27
4 January 2021
16:05 (D/N)
Scorecard

Melbourne Stars; 6/183 (20 overs)	v	Hobart Hurricanes; 6/173 (20 overs)
Marcus Stoinis 97* (55); Nathan Ellis 3/31 (4 overs)		Ben McDermott 91 (58); Sam Rainbird 2/22 (4 overs)

Melbourne Stars won by 10 runs
Blundstone Arena, Hobart
Attendance: 6,082
Umpires: Gerard Abood and Nathan Johnstone
Player of the match: Marcus Stoinis (Melbourne Stars)

- Hobart Hurricanes won the toss and elected to field.

Match 28
4 January 2021
19:15 (N)
Scorecard

Sydney Thunder; 8/174 (20 overs)	v	Brisbane Heat; 5/175 (19.1 overs)
Alex Hales 46 (26); Mujeeb Ur Rahman 2/26 (4 overs)		Joe Burns 52 (38); Tanveer Sangha 3/40 (3.1 overs)

Brisbane Heat won by 5 wickets
The Gabba, Brisbane
Attendance: 16,306
Umpires: Phillip Gillespie and Tony Wilds
Player of the match: Joe Burns (Brisbane Heat)

- Sydney Thunder won the toss and elected to bat.
- X-factor subs: Chris Lynn (Brisbane Heat) replaced Matthew Kuhnemann.
- Daniel Sams (Sydney Thunder) was replaced by Chris Tremain during Brisbane Heat's innings, after suffering a concussion.

Match 29
5 January 2021
19:15 (N)
Scorecard

Adelaide Strikers; 5/171 (20 overs)	v	Melbourne Renegades; 111 (19.1 overs)
Jake Weatherald 51 (25); Imad Wasim 2/13 (3 overs)		Mackenzie Harvey 34 (29); Peter Siddle 3/16 (3.1 overs)

Adelaide Strikers won by 60 runs
Adelaide Oval, Adelaide
Attendance: 12,707
Umpires: Darren Close and Sam Nogajski
Player of the match: Ryan Gibson (Adelaide Strikers)

- Adelaide Strikers won the toss and elected to bat.

Match 30
6 January 2021
19:15 (D/N)
Scorecard

Perth Scorchers; 4/183 (20 overs)	v	Sydney Sixers; 97 (16.4 overs)
Mitchell Marsh 57* (27); Lloyd Pope 2/13 (2 overs)		Jack Edwards 44 (38); Andrew Tye 4/20 (3.4 overs)

Perth Scorchers won by 86 runs
Optus Stadium, Perth
Attendance: 21,608
Umpires: Michael Graham-Smith and Donovan Koch
Player of the match: Mitchell Marsh (Perth Scorchers)

- Sydney Sixers won the toss and elected to field.
- X-factor subs: Lloyd Pope (Sydney Sixers) replaced Ben Dwarshuis.

Match 31
7 January 2021
18:10 (D/N)
Scorecard

Sydney Thunder; 5/167 (20 overs)	v	Hobart Hurricanes; 8/128 (20 overs)
Usman Khawaja 49 (33); D'Arcy Short 3/26 (4 overs)		Peter Handscomb 30 (24); Chris Green 2/23 (4 overs)

Sydney Thunder won by 39 runs
Optus Stadium, Perth
Attendance: 2,940
Umpires: Donovan Koch and Nathan Johnstone
Player of the match: Nathan McAndrew (Sydney Thunder)

- Hobart Hurricanes won the toss and elected to field.
- X-factor subs: Mac Wright (Hobart Hurricanes) replaced Johan Botha.

Match 32
7 January 2021
21:20 (N)
Scorecard

Brisbane Heat; 3/115 (10 overs)	v	Melbourne Stars; 5/111 (10 overs)
Chris Lynn 48 (23); Adam Zampa 2/7 (2 overs)		Nick Larkin 35* (16); Mark Steketee 3/25 (2 overs)

Brisbane Heat won by 17 runs (DLS method)
Metricon Stadium, Gold Coast
Attendance: 6,220
Umpires: Gerard Abood and Phillip Gillespie
Player of the match: Chris Lynn (Brisbane Heat)

- Melbourne Stars won the toss and elected to field.
- The match was reduced to 10 overs per side due to rain. Melbourne Stars were set a revised target of 129 runs.

Match 33
8 January 2021
18:10 (D/N)
Scorecard

Adelaide Strikers; 7/177 (20 overs)	v	Melbourne Renegades; 4/178 (19.5 overs)
Phil Salt 59 (42); Peter Hatzoglou 3/43 (4 overs)		Mohammad Nabi 71* (41); Rashid Khan 2/24 (4 overs)

Melbourne Renegades won by 6 wickets
Adelaide Oval, Adelaide
Attendance: 14,609
Umpires: Darren Close and David Taylor
Player of the match: Mohammad Nabi (Melbourne Renegades)

- Adelaide Strikers won the toss and elected to bat.

Match 34
9 January 2021
19:15 (D/N)
Scorecard

Perth Scorchers; 6/185 (20 overs)	v	Sydney Thunder; 168 (20 overs)
Colin Munro 50 (41); Brendan Doggett 4/22 (4 overs)		Sam Billings 83 (48); Jhye Richardson 4/24 (4 overs)

Perth Scorchers won by 17 runs
Optus Stadium, Perth
Attendance: 27,566
Umpires: Michael Graham-Smith and Donovan Koch
Player of the match: Jhye Richardson (Perth Scorchers)

- Sydney Thunder won the toss and elected to field.

Match 35
10 January 2021
19:15 (N)
Scorecard

Brisbane Heat; 148 (20 overs)	v	Sydney Sixers; 7/152 (20 overs)
Chris Lynn 56 (44); Carlos Brathwaite 4/18 (4 overs)		Dan Christian 61* (38); Mujeeb Ur Rahman 2/16 (4 overs)

Sydney Sixers won by 3 wickets
Metricon Stadium, Gold Coast
Attendance: 7,752
Umpires: Greg Davidson and Tony Wilds
Player of the match: Dan Christian (Sydney Sixers)

- Sydney Sixers won the toss and elected to field.
- Dan Christian (Sydney Sixers) scored his 5,000th T20 run.

Match 36
11 January 2021
19:15 (N)
Scorecard

Melbourne Stars; 7/149 (20 overs)	v	Adelaide Strikers; 5/150 (19 overs)
Nic Maddinson 48* (34); Wes Agar 2/19 (4 overs)		Jonathan Wells 36 (27); Adam Zampa 2/20 (4 overs)

Adelaide Strikers won by 5 wickets
Adelaide Oval, Adelaide
Attendance: 14,390
Umpires: Sam Nogajski and David Taylor
Player of the match: Wes Agar (Adelaide Strikers)

- Melbourne Stars won the toss and elected to bat.

Match 37
12 January 2021
19:15 (D/N)
Scorecard

Hobart Hurricanes; 5/139 (20 overs)	v	Perth Scorchers; 1/140 (16.2 overs)
D'Arcy Short 54 (47); Aaron Hardie 2/36 (4 overs)		Jason Roy 74* (52); Scott Boland 1/26 (4 overs)

Perth Scorchers won by 9 wickets
Optus Stadium, Perth
Attendance: 23,609
Umpires: Michael Graham-Smith and Nathan Johnstone
Player of the match: Jason Roy (Perth Scorchers)

- Hobart Hurricanes won the toss and elected to bat.
- Mitchell Owen (Hobart Hurricanes) made his T20 debut.
- X-factor subs: Kurtis Patterson (Perth Scorchers) replaced Mitchell Marsh.

Match 38
13 January 2021
19:15 (N)
Scorecard

Sydney Thunder; 6/166 (20 overs)	v	Sydney Sixers; 5/132 (12.4 overs)
Alex Hales 54 (33); Steve O'Keefe 3/15 (4 overs)		Josh Philippe 64 (36); Daniel Sams 2/25 (2.4 overs)

Sydney Sixers won by 5 wickets (DLS method)
Manuka Oval, Canberra
Attendance: 4,655
Umpires: Gerard Abood and Tony Wilds
Player of the match: Steve O'Keefe (Sydney Sixers)

- Sydney Sixers won the toss and elected to field.
- Sydney Sixers were set a revised target of 129 runs from 14 overs due to rain.

Match 39
14 January 2021
19:15 (N)
Scorecard

Melbourne Renegades; 6/149 (20 overs)	v	Brisbane Heat; 5/150 (18.4 overs)
Beau Webster 50* (40); Mark Steketee 2/24 (4 overs)		Chris Lynn 50 (40); Peter Hatzoglou 2/28 (4 overs)

Brisbane Heat won by 5 wickets
Manuka Oval, Canberra
Closed Event
Umpires: Gerard Abood and Greg Davidson
Player of the match: Joe Burns (Brisbane Heat)

- Brisbane Heat won the toss and elected to field.
- X-factor subs: Morné Morkel (Brisbane Heat) replaced Xavier Bartlett.

Match 40
15 January 2021
19:15 (N)
Scorecard

Melbourne Stars; 2/179 (20 overs)	v	Adelaide Strikers; 68 (14.2 overs)
Andre Fletcher 89* (49); Danny Briggs 1/36 (4 overs); Cameron Valente 1/36 (4 overs)		Matt Renshaw 20 (23); Adam Zampa 5/17 (3.2 overs)

Melbourne Stars won by 111 runs
Melbourne Cricket Ground, Melbourne
Attendance: 12,189
Umpires: Shawn Craig and Sam Nogajski
Player of the match: Andre Fletcher (Melbourne Stars)

- Adelaide Strikers won the toss and elected to field.

Match 41
16 January 2021
18:40 (N)
Scorecard

Perth Scorchers; 7/163 (20 overs)	v	Sydney Sixers; 3/164 (18.5 overs)
Liam Livingstone 67 (38); Carlos Brathwaite 2/12 (3 overs)		Josh Philippe 84 (52); Jason Behrendorff 1/19 (4 overs)

Sydney Sixers won by 7 wickets
Manuka Oval, Canberra
Attendance: 4,203
Umpires: Gerard Abood and Tony Wilds
Player of the match: Josh Philippe (Sydney Sixers)

- Perth Scorchers won the toss and elected to bat.

Match 42
17 January 2021
19:15 (N)
Scorecard

Melbourne Renegades; 150 (19.5 overs)	v	Melbourne Stars; 4/153 (19.1 overs)
Sam Harper 63 (52); Liam Hatcher 3/29 (4 overs)		Nick Larkin 43 (32); Marcus Stoinis 43 (32); Kane Richardson 2/24 (4 overs)

Melbourne Stars won by 6 wickets
Melbourne Cricket Ground, Melbourne
Attendance: 14,979
Umpires: Shawn Craig and Donovan Koch
Player of the match: Liam Hatcher (Melbourne Stars)

- Melbourne Renegades won the toss and elected to bat.

Match 43
18 January 2021
19:15 (N)
Scorecard

Sydney Thunder; 5/177 (20 overs)	v	Hobart Hurricanes; 4/181 (18 overs)
Sam Billings 50 (34); Scott Boland 4/41 (4 overs)		Ben McDermott 96 (56); Tanveer Sangha 2/45 (4 overs)

Hobart Hurricanes won by 6 wickets
Manuka Oval, Canberra
Attendance: 3,797
Umpires: Greg Davidson and Tony Wilds
Player of the match: Ben McDermott (Hobart Hurricanes)

- Hobart Hurricanes won the toss and elected to field.

Match 44
19 January 2021
19:15 (N)
Scorecard

Perth Scorchers; 5/174 (20 overs)	v	Brisbane Heat; 115 (16.4 overs)
Colin Munro 82 (54); Morné Morkel 2/24 (4 overs)		Chris Lynn 27 (16); Fawad Ahmed 3/25 (3.4 overs)

Perth Scorchers won by 59 runs
Marvel Stadium, Melbourne
Attendance: 1,568
Umpires: Darren Close and Michael Graham-Smith
Player of the match: Colin Munro (Perth Scorchers)

- Brisbane Heat won the toss and elected to field.
- X-factor subs: James Bazley (Brisbane Heat) replaced Xavier Bartlett.

Match 45
20 January 2021
19:15 (N)
Scorecard

Melbourne Stars; 6/158 (20 overs)	v	Melbourne Renegades; 5/160 (19.4 overs)
Nick Larkin 61* (47); Zak Evans 2/23 (4 overs)		Mackenzie Harvey 47* (21); Nathan Coulter-Nile 3/41 (4 overs)

Melbourne Renegades won by 5 wickets
Marvel Stadium, Melbourne
Attendance: 14,208
Umpires: Shawn Craig and Sam Nogajski
Player of the match: Mackenzie Harvey (Melbourne Renegades)

- Melbourne Stars won the toss and elected to bat.

Match 46
21 January 2021
19:15 (N)
Scorecard

Adelaide Strikers; 5/197 (20 overs)	v	Brisbane Heat; 115 (17.3 overs)
Alex Carey 101 (62); Marnus Labuschagne 2/20 (2 overs)		Marnus Labuschagne 28 (25); Wes Agar 4/27 (4 overs)

Adelaide Strikers won by 82 runs
Adelaide Oval, Adelaide
Attendance: 9,022
Umpires: Gerard Abood and Greg Davidson
Player of the match: Alex Carey (Adelaide Strikers)

- Adelaide Strikers won the toss and elected to bat.
- X-factor subs: Max Bryant (Brisbane Heat) replaced Morné Morkel.

Match 47
22 January 2021
16:05 (D/N)
Scorecard

Perth Scorchers; 8/179 (20 overs)	v	Hobart Hurricanes; 8/157 (20 overs)
Josh Inglis 58 (35); Nathan Ellis 4/34 (4 overs)		D'Arcy Short 43 (37); Jhye Richardson 4/33 (4 overs)

Perth Scorchers won by 22 runs
Marvel Stadium, Melbourne
Attendance: 1,503
Umpires: Shawn Craig and Phillip Gillespie
Player of the match: Jhye Richardson (Perth Scorchers)

- Perth Scorchers won the toss and elected to bat.

Match 48
22 January 2021
19:15 (N)
Scorecard

Sydney Thunder; 5/232 (20 overs)	v	Sydney Sixers; 5/186 (20 overs)
Alex Hales 110 (56); Ben Dwarshuis 3/38 (4 overs)		Moises Henriques 56 (35); Tanveer Sangha 2/34 (4 overs)

Sydney Thunder won by 46 runs
Adelaide Oval, Adelaide
Attendance: 2,651
Umpires: Greg Davidson and Tony Wilds
Player of the match: Alex Hales (Sydney Thunder)

- Sydney Sixers won the toss and elected to field.
- Sydney Thunder scored the highest team total in the BBL.
- Dan Christian (Sydney Sixers) became the first cricketer to play 100 games in the BBL.

Match 49
23 January 2021
16:05 (D/N)
Scorecard

Brisbane Heat; 5/173 (20 overs)	v	Melbourne Renegades; 147 (18.4 overs)
Chris Lynn 52 (30); Zak Evans 3/34 (3 overs)		Sam Harper 57 (32); Mark Steketee 3/41 (3.4 overs)

Brisbane Heat won by 26 runs
Marvel Stadium, Melbourne
Attendance: 5,691
Umpires: Donovan Koch and Sam Nogajski
Player of the match: Marnus Labuschagne (Brisbane Heat)

- Brisbane Heat won the toss and elected to bat.

Match 50
23 January 2021
19:15 (N)
Scorecard

Perth Scorchers; 4/182 (20 overs)	v	Melbourne Stars; 6/171 (20 overs)
Jason Roy 54 (32); Marcus Stoinis 1/16 (2 overs)		Nick Larkin 70 (44); Andrew Tye 2/28 (4 overs)

Perth Scorchers won by 11 runs
Melbourne Cricket Ground, Melbourne
Attendance: 11,193
Umpires: Phillip Gillespie and Michael Graham-Smith
Player of the match: Jason Roy (Perth Scorchers)

- Melbourne Stars won the toss and elected to field.

Match 51
24 January 2021
16:05 (D/N)
Scorecard

Adelaide Strikers; 6/159 (20 overs)	v	Sydney Thunder; 7/153 (20 overs)
Travis Head 31 (24); Phil Salt 31 (24); Brendan Doggett 2/21 (4 overs)		Usman Khawaja 36 (30); Michael Neser 2/17 (3 overs)

Adelaide Strikers won by 6 runs
Adelaide Oval, Adelaide
Attendance: 4,740
Umpires: Gerard Abood and Tony Wilds
Player of the match: Peter Siddle (Adelaide Strikers)

- Adelaide Strikers won the toss and elected to bat.
- X-factor subs: Alex Ross (Sydney Thunder) replaced Tanveer Sangha.

Match 52
24 January 2021
19:15 (N)
Scorecard

Hobart Hurricanes; 8/188 (20 overs)	v	Sydney Sixers; 8/181 (20 overs)
Matthew Wade 86 (44); Sean Abbott 2/32 (4 overs)		Jordan Silk 78 (49); Nathan Ellis 3/36 (4 overs)

Hobart Hurricanes won by 7 runs
Melbourne Cricket Ground, Melbourne
Attendance: 1,042
Umpires: Darren Close and Shawn Craig
Player of the match: Matthew Wade (Hobart Hurricanes)

- Sydney Sixers won the toss and elected to field.
- X-factor subs: Tim David (Hobart Hurricanes) replaced Peter Handscomb.
- Sean Abbott (Sydney Sixers) became the second bowler to take 100 wickets in the BBL.

Match 53
25 January 2021
19:15 (N)
Scorecard

Adelaide Strikers; 4/115 (14 overs)	v	Sydney Thunder; 1/116 (12.1 overs)
Jake Weatherald 80* (47); Nathan McAndrew 1/8 (2 overs)		Alex Hales 63* (39); Daniel Worrall 1/24 (3 overs)

Sydney Thunder won by 9 wickets
Adelaide Oval, Adelaide
Attendance: 8,375
Umpires: Gerard Abood and Greg Davidson
Player of the match: Alex Hales (Sydney Thunder)

- Sydney Thunder won the toss and elected to field.
- The match was reduced to 14 overs per side due to rain.

Match 54
26 January 2021
12:30
Scorecard

Brisbane Heat; 7/181 (20 overs)	v	Perth Scorchers; 6/175 (20 overs)
Chris Lynn 51 (25); Andrew Tye 2/23 (4 overs)		Mitchell Marsh 54* (26); Marnus Labuschagne 3/35 (4 overs)

Brisbane Heat won by 6 runs
Adelaide Oval, Adelaide
Attendance: 1,436
Umpires: Greg Davidson and Tony Wilds
Player of the match: Marnus Labuschagne (Brisbane Heat)

- Perth Scorchers won the toss and elected to field.
- X-factor subs: Jack Wildermuth (Brisbane Heat) replaced Xavier Bartlett.

Match 55
26 January 2021
15:50 (D/N)
Scorecard

Melbourne Renegades; 5/150 (20 overs)	v	Hobart Hurricanes; 9/139 (20 overs)
Beau Webster 54* (35); Riley Meredith 3/22 (4 overs)		Dawid Malan 34 (36); Zak Evans 5/33 (4 overs)

Melbourne Renegades won by 11 runs
Melbourne Cricket Ground, Melbourne
Attendance: 14,888
Umpires: Darren Close and Michael Graham-Smith
Player of the match: Zak Evans (Melbourne Renegades)

- Hobart Hurricanes won the toss and elected to field.
- X-factor subs: Tim David (Hobart Hurricanes) replaced Nicholas Winter.

Match 56
26 January 2021
19:30 (N)
Scorecard

Melbourne Stars; 6/177 (20 overs)	v	Sydney Sixers; 5/180 (19.5 overs)
Glenn Maxwell 66 (41); Ben Dwarshuis 3/27 (4 overs)		Dan Christian 49* (23); Nic Maddinson 1/6 (1 over)

Sydney Sixers won by 5 wickets
Melbourne Cricket Ground, Melbourne
Attendance: 14,888
Umpires: Shawn Craig and Phillip Gillespie
Player of the match: Ben Dwarshuis (Sydney Sixers)

- Sydney Sixers won the toss and elected to field.
- X-factor subs: Jake Ball (Sydney Sixers) replaced Jackson Bird.

== Play-offs ==
Eliminator
4	Brisbane Heat	4/131
5	Adelaide Strikers	7/130

Qualifier
1	Sydney Sixers	1/168
2	Perth Scorchers	6/167
Knockout
3	Sydney Thunder	8/158
4	Brisbane Heat	3/162

Challenger
2	Perth Scorchers	1/189
4	Brisbane Heat	9/150

Grand final
1	Sydney Sixers	6/188
2	Perth Scorchers	9/161

=== Eliminator ===
29 January 2021
19:15 (N)
Scorecard

Adelaide Strikers; 7/130 (20 overs)	v	Brisbane Heat; 4/131 (18.5 overs)
Jake Weatherald 32 (28); Marnus Labuschagne 3/13 (3 overs)		Jimmy Peirson 47* (44); Peter Siddle 1/14 (3 overs)

Brisbane Heat won by 6 wickets
The Gabba, Brisbane
Attendance: 20,942
Umpires: Michael Graham-Smith and Donovan Koch
Player of the match: Jimmy Peirson (Brisbane Heat)

- Adelaide Strikers won the toss and elected to bat.
- X-factor subs: Jonathan Wells (Adelaide Strikers) replaced Daniel Worrall and Morné Morkel (Brisbane Heat) replaced Xavier Bartlett.

=== Qualifier ===
30 January 2021
19:15 (N)
Scorecard

Perth Scorchers; 6/167 (20 overs)	v	Sydney Sixers; 1/168 (17 overs)
Josh Inglis 69* (41); Ben Dwarshuis 2/40 (4 overs)		James Vince 98* (53); Liam Livingstone 1/16 (2 overs)

Sydney Sixers won by 9 wickets
Manuka Oval, Canberra
Attendance: 6,434
Umpires: Sam Nogajski and Paul Wilson
Player of the match: James Vince (Sydney Sixers)

- Perth Scorchers won the toss and elected to bat.

=== Knockout ===
31 January 2021
19:15 (N)
Scorecard

Sydney Thunder; 8/158 (20 overs)	v	Brisbane Heat; 3/162 (19.1 overs)
Ben Cutting 34* (18); Mark Steketee 2/22 (3 overs)		Sam Heazlett 74* (49); Daniel Sams 1/32 (4 overs)

Brisbane Heat won by 7 wickets
Manuka Oval, Canberra
Attendance: 5,374
Umpires: Michael Graham-Smith and Donovan Koch
Player of the match: Sam Heazlett (Brisbane Heat)

- Brisbane Heat won the toss and elected to field.
- X-factor subs: Morné Morkel (Brisbane Heat) replaced Xavier Bartlett.

=== Challenger ===
4 February 2021
19:40 (N)
Scorecard

Perth Scorchers; 1/189 (18.1 overs)	v	Brisbane Heat; 9/150 (18 overs)
Liam Livingstone 77 (39); Mitchell Swepson 1/26 (4 overs)		Joe Burns 38 (24); Aaron Hardie 3/46 (4 overs)

Perth Scorchers won by 49 runs (DLS method)
Manuka Oval, Canberra
Attendance: 4,490
Umpires: Gerard Abood and Shawn Craig
Player of the match: Liam Livingstone (Perth Scorchers)

- Brisbane Heat won the toss and elected to field.
- Rain stopped play during Perth Scorchers innings. Brisbane Heat were set a revised target of 200 from 18 overs.
- X-factor subs: Morné Morkel (Brisbane Heat) replaced Mark Steketee.

=== Final ===
6 February 2021
19:40 (N)
Scorecard

Sydney Sixers; 6/188 (20 overs)	v	Perth Scorchers; 9/161 (20 overs)
James Vince 95 (60); Andrew Tye 2/29 (4 overs)		Liam Livingstone 45 (35); Ben Dwarshuis 3/37 (4 overs)

Sydney Sixers won by 27 runs
Sydney Cricket Ground, Sydney
Attendance: 25,295
Umpires: Sam Nogajski and Paul Wilson
Player of the match: James Vince (Sydney Sixers)

- Perth Scorchers won the toss and elected to field.
