= Georgia Prestwidge =

Australian cricketer

Personal information
- Full name: Georgia Kate Prestwidge
- Born: 17 December 1997 (age 28); Brisbane, Queensland, Australia
- Batting: Right-handed
- Bowling: Right-arm medium
- Role: Bowler
- Relatives: Scott Prestwidge (father); Jack Prestwidge (brother); Will Prestwidge (brother)

Domestic team information
- Years: Team
- 2014/15–2022/23: Queensland (squad no. 16)
- 2016/17–2021/22: Brisbane Heat (squad no. 16)
- 2022/23–present: Melbourne Renegades (squad no. 16)
- 2023/24–present: Victoria (squad no. 16)

Career statistics
Competition	WLA	WT20
Matches	58	74
Runs scored	336	125
Batting average	14.22	5.00
100s/50s	0/2	0/0
Top score	56*	16
Balls bowled	2,008	981
Wickets	57	46
Bowling average	28.63	28.65
5 wickets in innings	0	0
10 wickets in match	0	0
Best bowling	4/41	4/12
Catches/stumpings	9/–	14/–
- Source: CricketArchive, 28 March 2021

Georgia Kate Prestwidge (born 17 December 1997) is an Australian cricketer who plays as a right-arm medium bowler and right-handed batter for Victoria in the Women's National Cricket League (WNCL) and Melbourne Renegades in the Women's Big Bash League (WBBL). She has previously played for Queensland and Brisbane Heat.

Prestwidge is the daughter of former Queensland Bulls all rounder Scott Prestwidge and the sister of current Melbourne Renegades bowler Jack Prestwidge. She made her debut for the Fire in October 2014, but did not bat or bowl in that match. At the end of the 2015–16 season, she was named the Queensland Fire Youth Player of the Year.

On 13 October 2016, Prestwidge was reported for having a suspected illegal bowling action during a WNCL match against Tasmania at Allan Border Field. On 12 November 2016, Cricket Australia announced that an analysis undertaken on 28 October 2016 by the Biomechanics Department at the Bupa National Cricket Centre had found Prestwidge's bowling action to be illegal, and that she had therefore been suspended from bowling in Cricket Australia sanctioned matches with immediate effect.

Despite that setback, Prestwidge was added to the Brisbane Heat squad in December 2016 for its 2016–17 campaign. She made her Heat debut on 11 December 2016 against the Sydney Sixers. In November 2018, she was named in Brisbane Heat's squad for the 2018–19 Women's Big Bash League season.
