= Adam Voges =

Australian cricketer

Adam Voges OAM
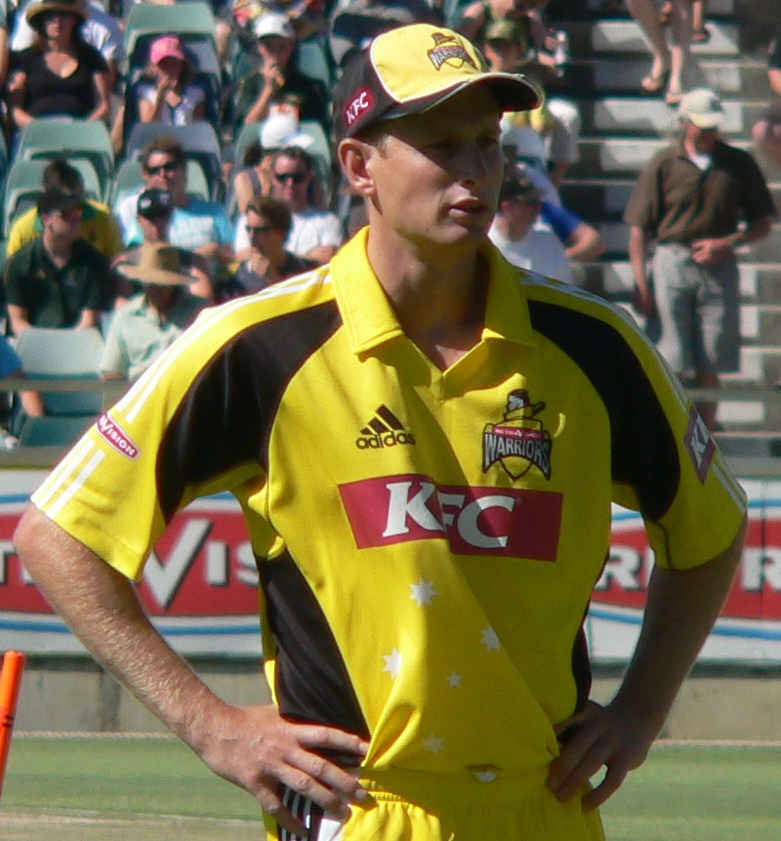
- Voges in January 2008

Personal information
- Full name: Adam Charles Voges
- Born: 4 October 1979 (age 47); Subiaco, Western Australia, Australia
- Height: 1.87 m (6 ft 2 in)
- Batting: Right-handed
- Bowling: Slow left-arm orthodox
- Role: Top-order batter

International information
- National side: Australia (2007–2016)
- Test debut (cap 442): 3 June 2015 v West Indies
- Last Test: 12 November 2016 v South Africa
- ODI debut (cap 163): 20 February 2007 v New Zealand
- Last ODI: 2 November 2013 v India
- ODI shirt no.: 24
- T20I debut (cap 28): 11 December 2007 v New Zealand
- Last T20I: 13 February 2013 v West Indies

Domestic team information
- Years: Team
- 2002/02–2016/17: Western Australia
- 2007: Hampshire
- 2008–2012: Nottinghamshire
- 2010: Rajasthan Royals
- 2011/12: Melbourne Stars
- 2012/13–2017/18: Perth Scorchers (squad no. 32)
- 2013–2017: Middlesex
- 2014: Jamaica Tallawahs

Head coaching information
- Years: Team
- 2018–: Western Australia
- 2018–: Perth Scorchers
- 2026–present: Rawalpindiz

Career statistics
Competition	Test	ODI	FC	LA
Matches	20	31	211	191
Runs scored	1,485	870	13,881	6,130
Batting average	61.87	45.78	46.42	43.47
100s/50s	6/5	1/4	32/72	5/47
Top score	269*	112*	269*	112*
Balls bowled	76	301	3,770	1,881
Wickets	0	6	56	39
Bowling average	–	46.00	36.08	41.12
5 wickets in innings	–	0	0	0
10 wickets in match	–	0	0	0
Best bowling	–	1/3	4/92	3/20
Catches/stumpings	15/–	7/–	282/–	80/–
Medal record
Representing Australia
ICC Champions Trophy
Winner	2009 South Africa
- Source: ESPNcricinfo, 2 December 2017

Adam Charles Voges OAM (/ˈvoʊdʒɪz/, born 4 October 1979) is an Australian cricket coach and former cricketer who played for the Australian national team at Test, One Day International (ODI), and Twenty20 International (T20I) level, and also captained Western Australia and Perth Scorchers in domestic cricket. Voges' Test match batting average of 61.87 is second among men's Test cricketers who have played a minimum of 20 innings. Voges was included in the 2016 ICC Test Match Team of the Year. With his country, he won the 2009 ICC Champions Trophy.

From Perth, Western Australia, Voges excelled at cricket from an early age, attending the Western Australian Institute of Sport and playing for the Australian under-19 team. He made his first-class debut for Western Australia in the 2002–03 Sheffield Shield, and had established himself in the team by the middle of the decade, playing as a middle-order batsman and part-time left-arm orthodox bowler. Voges debuted for Australia during the 2006–07 Chappell–Hadlee Trophy, and played irregularly at both ODI and T20I level throughout the remainder of the decade.

In October 2012, after Marcus North's resignation, Voges was appointed acting captain of Western Australia. For the inaugural Big Bash League, he signed with the Melbourne Stars franchise, although he switched to the Perth Scorchers the following season. In overseas competitions, Voges has represented Hampshire, Nottinghamshire, and Middlesex (captain 2015–2016) in English county cricket, and also played for the Rajasthan Royals in the Indian Premier League and the Jamaica Tallawahs in the Caribbean Premier League.

Voges made his Test debut for Australia in June 2015, aged 35, and scored a century on debut against the West Indies. He recorded a second century in November 2015, against New Zealand, and later scored 269 not out, 106 not out, and 239 in consecutive innings from December 2015 to February 2016, breaking Sachin Tendulkar's record for the most runs between dismissals in Test cricket.

In February 2017, Voges announced his retirement from international cricket. His last match was as captain of the Prime Minister's XI team against Sri Lanka on 15 February 2017. The next month, he also announced his retirement from domestic cricket, following the conclusion of the 2016–17 Sheffield Shield season.

On 16 October 2017, he re-signed on for 2017–18 Big Bash League season with the Perth Scorchers.

== Early career ==
Born in Subiaco, Western Australia, Voges was raised in Rockingham, and attended Safety Bay Senior High School. In WACA District Cricket, he originally fell under the Rockingham-Mandurah District Cricket Club's recruitment zone, but transferred to the Melville Cricket Club on a special permit. He went on to tour with the Western Australia under-19 cricket team, and captained the team during the 1998–99 season, later playing for Australia at under-19 level. Voges was the winner of the 2001–02 Olly Cooley Medal for the best player in the WACA grade cricket competition. Voges made his first-class debut on 8 December 2002 for Western Australia in the Pura Cup match against Tasmania. After averaging only 17 with the bat in the four matches he played, he spent the 2003/04 season playing grade cricket.

== 2004/05/06 seasons ==
He made his List A debut in the ING Cup match against Tasmania in October 2004, and was also recalled to the Pura Cup team. In just his second one-day match at North Sydney Oval, Voges set the record for the fastest domestic one-day century, bringing up his 100 off only 62 balls (and hitting the ING sign on one of his 7 sixes, which earned him $50,000). He finished the ING Cup season with an average of just under 32, and a Pura Cup average of 72 from 6 matches.

2005/06 was a mixed season, which saw him average 34 in Pura Cup and 49 in the ING Cup.

== 2006/07 season and international selection ==
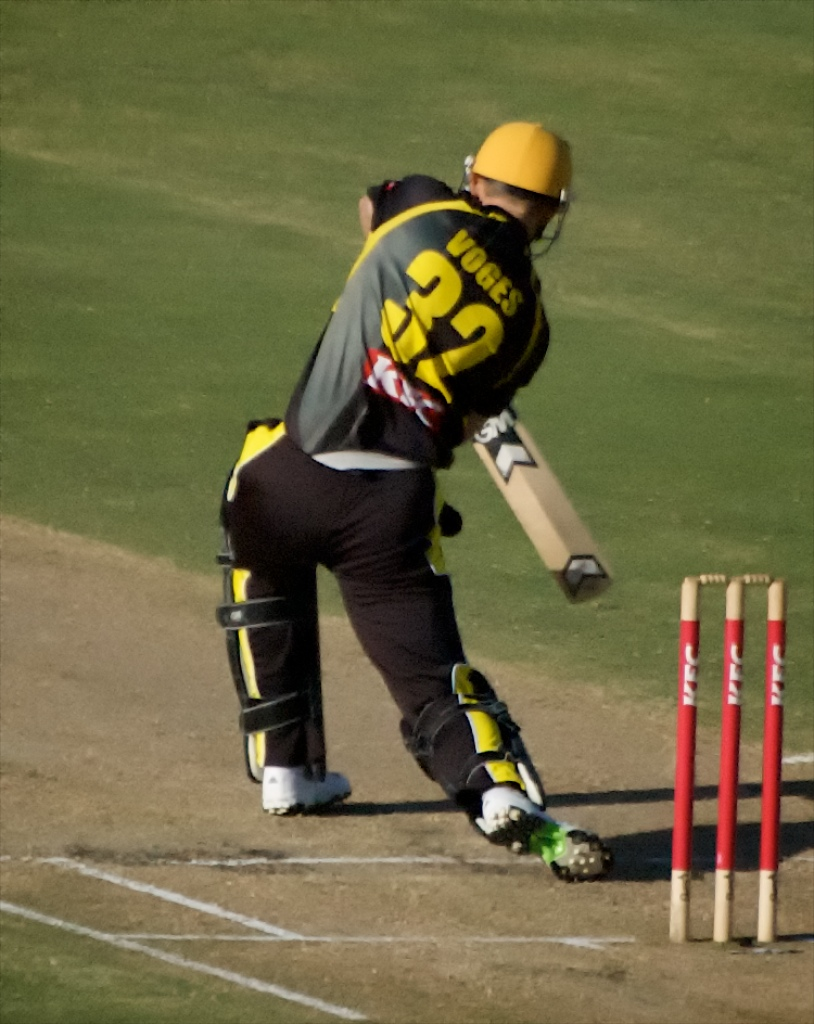
Voges batting for WA against Victoria in the 2009–10 KFC Twenty20 Big Bash.

In 2006/07, Voges enjoyed a very good start to the season with two first-class centuries in his first three matches. This good form led to his surprise selection to the Australian squad for the 3rd Ashes Test. On Friday, 8 December 2006, Australian selectors had been expected to select an unchanged lineup, but due to the shock retirement of Damien Martyn, selection processes were re-thought with Andrew Symonds and Voges drafted into the 13-man lineup. Voges also scored 150 against Tasmania, nearly chasing down a total of 400 early in the season.

Voges learned of the news during a tour match between his team, the Cricket Australia XI, and the ECB Chairman's XI at Lilac Hill. Of his learning of the selection, Voges said: "Tony Dodemaide tapped me on the shoulder and he said: 'Come with me. You're being substituted'. I thought I was in trouble."

Voges made his ODI debut on 20 February 2007 vs New Zealand in the Chappell–Hadlee Series before being selected for the Tour of India in September 2007. In December 2007 he made his Twenty20 International debut, also against New Zealand, at his home ground in Perth.

On 15 February 2009, Voges made a stunning catch in a Twenty20 game against New Zealand at the Sydney Cricket Ground to catch Brendon McCullum out for 61 in the penultimate over. Catching the ball on the boundary line, but not in full control (as the rules for a catch demand) he tossed the ball forwards into the air as he tumbled backwards over the boundary rope. He then scrambled back into the field of play and took a diving catch low to the ground. The 3rd umpire confirmed a valid catch and centre umpire Paul Reiffel (former Australian bowler) gave McCullum out. Australia went on to win the match by one run.

Voges was included in Australia's one-day squad for the tour of South Africa. Batsman Marcus North was called up as batting cover while Voges returned home to marry his fiancée. Voges commented that "It's a big thing to give up an opportunity to play for Australia. But I guess you only get married once and that's important to me and a decision I've made and one that I'm comfortable with".

Voges also played in the ODI match against Scotland on 28 August 2009. He made 72, the second highest score behind David Hussey who made 111. Australia won the match.

Voges also played for the Rajasthan Royals in the 2010 IPL Season.

== 2015 Test debut and stand-in vice-captaincy ==
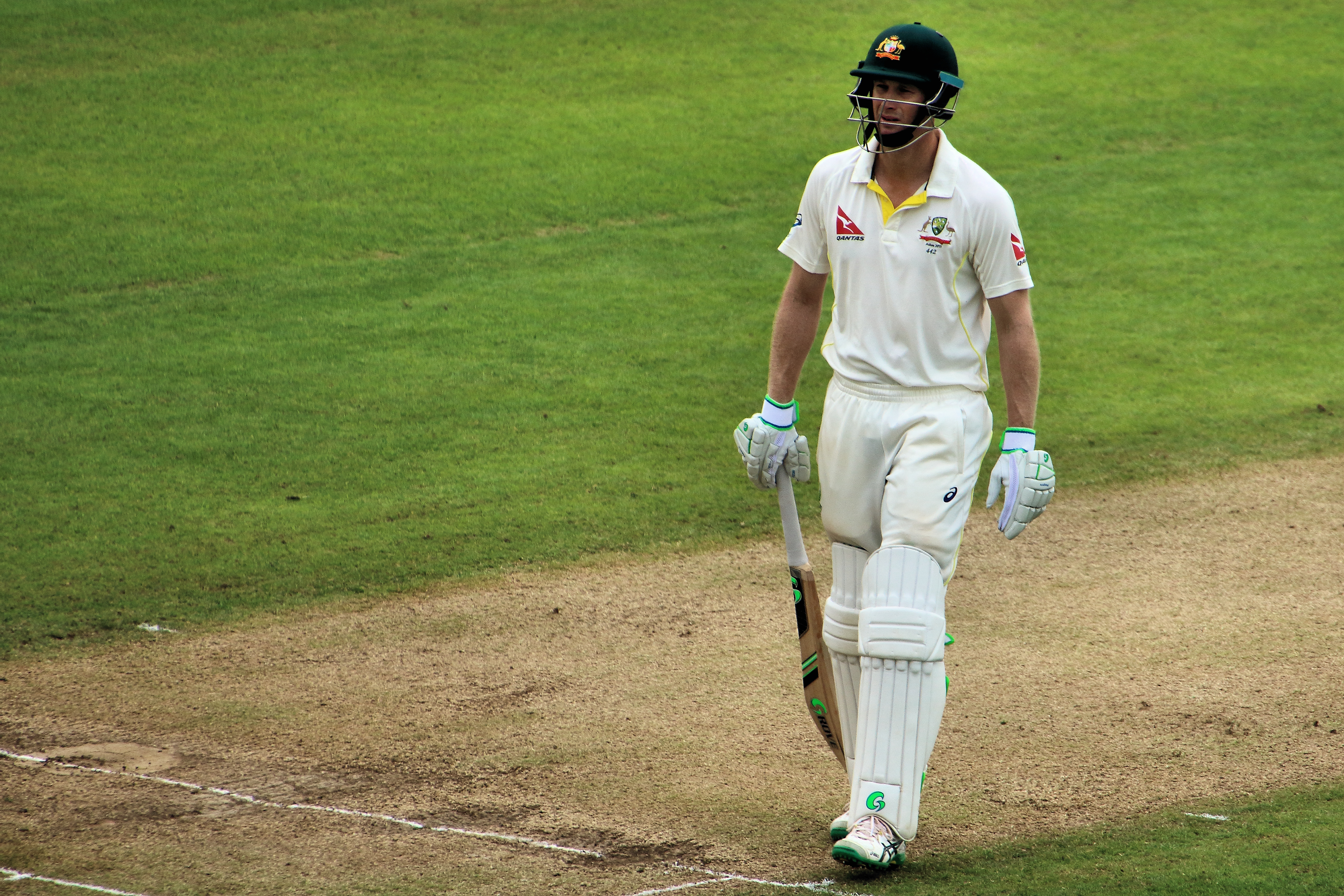
Voges playing for Australia in 2015

In April 2015, Voges was called up to the Australian Test Cricket squad for the first time, and made his Test debut in Dominica two months later when a head injury prevented Chris Rogers from taking part in the first Test against the West Indies. Before the match, he was presented with his baggy green cap by Brendon Julian, who had made his own Test debut for Australia on the same day 22 years earlier. By scoring a century in the first innings, Voges became the oldest centurion on Test debut, and subsequently the oldest player to be named man-of-the-match in their opening game at Test level.

Voges was named as stand-in test Vice-Captain for Australia after David Warner suffered a thumb fracture during the ODI series against England from the bowling of Steven Finn.

On 11 December 2015, Voges eclipsed the Bellerive Oval's scoring record, passing Ricky Ponting's record of 209 runs. He then surpassed Doug Walters' record of 242 for the highest score by an Australian against the West Indies. This was also his second century against West Indies.

At the age of 36 and 68 days, the Western Australian is the fourth-oldest Australian to achieve the feat behind Test greats Sir Donald Bradman, Allan Border and Ricky Ponting. Jack Ryder is the only other Australian to have posted a Test double ton beyond the age of 35.

This also makes him the oldest Australian to join the list of test double-centurions. The 449-run partnership between Voges and Shaun Marsh in this match was the highest 4th wicket partnership in Test cricket history at the time, the highest partnership in Australia, the highest against the West Indies, and the second-highest in Tests for Australia. It is also the sixth-highest ever partnership in Test history. In the Boxing Day Test, he became the third batsman to score over 1000 runs in his debut year (Mark Taylor with 1219 runs in 1989 and Alastair Cook with 1013 in 2006).

On 13 February 2016, during the First Test against New Zealand, Voges made his second Test double-century, scoring 239. During this innings, Voges broke the world record for the highest number of runs without a dismissal having previously scored 269* and 106* against the West Indies, for a total of 614, beating the previous record set by Sachin Tendulkar of 497. When he reached 172 not out his Test average passed 100, although when he was dismissed it dropped back to 97.46. His performances over the 2015–16 season were statistically some of the best of all time, scoring 969 runs at an average of 161.50, with only Bradman (twice) recording more than 500 runs at a higher season average.

For his performances in 2016, he was named in the World Test XI by the ICC.

== Career best performances ==
	Batting			
	Score	Fixture	Venue	Season
Test	269*	Australia v West Indies	Bellerive Oval, Hobart	2015
ODI	112*	Australia v West Indies	MCG, Melbourne	2013
T20I	51	Australia v West Indies	The Gabba, Brisbane	2013
FC	269*	Australia v West Indies	Bellerive Oval, Hobart	2015
LA	112*	Australia v West Indies	MCG, Melbourne	2013
T20	82*	Yorkshire v Nottinghamshire	Leeds, Yorkshire	2009

== Awards ==
Voges was awarded the Order of Australia Medal in the 2020 Australia Day Honours for "service to cricket."

== See also ==
- List of Test cricket centuries scored on debut

Sporting positions
Preceded by Chris Rogers	Middlesex County cricket captain 2015–2016	Succeeded by James Franklin
