= Australian cricket team in the West Indies in 2015 =

Australian cricket team in West Indies in 2015
	West Indies	Australia
- Dates: 27 May 2015 – 15 June 2015
Captains	Denesh Ramdin	Michael Clarke

Test series
- Result: Australia won the 2-match series 2–0
Most runs	Jason Holder (116)	Steve Smith (283)
Most wickets	Jerome Taylor (8)	Josh Hazlewood (12)
- Player of the series: Josh Hazlewood (Aus)

The Australian cricket team toured the West Indies from 27 May to 15 June 2015. The tour consisted of one first-class warm-up match and two Test matches. On 8 April 2015, the West Indies Cricket Board brought forward the date of the two Test matches by two days "due to a number of logistical challenges beyond [their] control". Australia won the 2-match Test series 2–0 and therefore retained the Frank Worrell Trophy.

== Squads ==
Australia announced their squad on 31 March 2015. They included three uncapped players, spinner Fawad Ahmed, wicket-keeper Peter Nevill and batsman Adam Voges. West Indies announced a training squad on 24 May 2015. Shivnarine Chanderpaul was not selected in the 12-man training squad, a decision that was criticised by Brian Lara. However, former fast-bowler Michael Holding backed the selectors saying that "I don't believe that cricketers should just get a series for getting a series sake". The full squad was announced on 30 May, with Chanderpaul ultimately being dropped. Australia's Chris Rogers was ruled out of the series after suffering a concussion while practicing in the nets before the first Test.

West Indies	Australia
Denesh Ramdin (c); Devendra Bishoo; Jermaine Blackwood; Kraigg Brathwaite; Darren Bravo; Rajendra Chandrika; Shane Dowrich; Shannon Gabriel; Jason Holder; Shai Hope; Veerasammy Permaul; Kemar Roach; Marlon Samuels; Jerome Taylor	Michael Clarke (c); Steve Smith (vc); Fawad Ahmed; Brad Haddin (wk); Josh Hazlewood; Mitchell Johnson; Nathan Lyon; Mitchell Marsh; Shaun Marsh; Peter Nevill; ~~Chris Rogers~~; Peter Siddle; Mitchell Starc; Adam Voges; David Warner; Shane Watson

== Tour match ==
=== WICB President's XI v Australians ===
27–29 May 2015
Scorecard

WICB President's XI	v	Australians
382 (114 overs); Shane Dowrich 78 (167); Josh Hazlewood 2/36 (19 overs)		250 (104 overs); Shaun Marsh 118 (220); Carlos Brathwaite 3/39 (21 overs)
161/4 (48 overs); Roston Chase 55* (103); Josh Hazlewood 3/4 (4 overs)

Match drawn
Sir Vivian Richards Stadium, North Sound, Antigua
Umpires: Nigel Duguid and Leslie Reifer
Player of the match: Shaun Marsh (Australians)

- WICB President's XI won the toss and elected to bat.

== Test series (Frank Worrell Trophy) ==
=== 1st Test ===
3–7 June 2015
Scorecard

West Indies	v	Australia
148 (53.5 overs); Shai Hope 36 (54); Josh Hazlewood 3/33 (15 overs)		318 (107 overs); Adam Voges 130* (247); Devendra Bishoo 6/80 (33 overs)
216 (86 overs); Marlon Samuels 74 (184); Mitchell Starc 4/28 (18 overs)		47/1 (5 overs); David Warner 28 (20); Jerome Taylor 1/22 (3 overs)

Australia won by 9 wickets
Windsor Park, Roseau, Dominica
Umpires: Aleem Dar (Pak) and Richard Kettleborough (Eng)
Player of the match: Adam Voges (Aus)

- West Indies won the toss and elected to bat.
- Shane Dowrich (WI) and Adam Voges (Aus) both made their Test debuts.
- Adam Voges became the oldest player to score a century on debut in a Test match.

=== 2nd Test ===
11–15 June 2015
Scorecard

Australia	v	West Indies
399 (126.5 overs); Steve Smith 199 (361); Jerome Taylor 6/47 (25 overs)		220 (59.5 overs); Jason Holder 82* (63); Josh Hazlewood 5/35 (15.5 overs)
212/2d (65 overs); Shaun Marsh 69 (153); Kemar Roach 1/26 (9 overs)		114 (42 overs); Denesh Ramdin 29 (74); Mitchell Starc 3/34 (13 overs)

Australia won by 277 runs
Sabina Park, Kingston, Jamaica
Umpires: Ian Gould (Eng) and Richard Kettleborough (Eng)
Player of the match: Steve Smith (Aus)

- West Indies won the toss and elected to field.
- Rajendra Chandrika (WI) made his Test debut.
- Steve Smith (Aus) made his highest score in Tests.
- Jerome Taylor (WI) took his best bowling figures in Tests.
