= Rajendra Chandrika =

Guyanese cricketer (born 1989)

Personal information
- Born: 8 August 1989 (age 37); Enterprise, Guyana
- Batting: Right-handed
- Bowling: Right-arm offbreak
- Role: Opening batsman

International information
- National side: West Indies
- Test debut: 11 June 2015 v Australia
- Last Test: 30 July 2016 v India

Domestic team information
- Years: Team
- 2008/09–2017/18: Guyana
- 2018/19: Leeward Islands

Career statistics
Competition	Test	FC	LA
Matches	5	60	27
Runs scored	140	2,682	491
Batting average	14.00	25.30	18.88
100s/50s	0/0	1/13	0/3
Top score	37	146	52
Catches/stumpings	2/–	35/–	8/–
- Source: ESPNCricinfo, 21 March 2019

Rajendra Chandrika (born 8 August 1989) is a Guyanese first-class cricketer. In May 2015 he was named in the 14-man Test squad to face Australia. He made his Test debut in the second Test of the series on 11 June at Sabina Park, Kingston.
