= Scott Prestwidge =

Australian cricketer (born 1968)

Scott Arthur Prestwidge (born 15 May 1968 in Bankstown, New South Wales), is a retired Australian cricketer who played for the Queensland Bulls in Australian domestic cricket. He was an all-rounder who bowled right arm fast medium, and was one of his country's inaugural inductees of the Australian Cricket Academy when it opened in 1988.

Prestwidge played one day cricket for Queensland between 1991/92 and 2000/01 and for the latter part of his career was a regular in the side. During that period he played only 3 first class games.

He was awarded the man of the match award in his side's Mercantile Mutual Cup Final victory in 1997–98. He was also a winner of the Peter Burge Medal, given to the best player of the season in Brisbane grade cricket.

Prestwidge is the father of bowlers Jack Prestwidge, Will Prestwidge and Queensland Fire and Brisbane Heat bowler Georgia Prestwidge.
