= Peter Hatzoglou =

Australian cricketer (born 1998)

Personal information
- Born: 27 November 1998 (age 27); Melbourne, Australia
- Height: 1.93 m (6 ft 4 in)
- Batting: Right-handed
- Bowling: Right-arm leg break
- Role: Bowler

Domestic team information
- Years: Team
- 2020/21: Melbourne Renegades (squad no. 41)
- 2020/21: South Australia (squad no. 43)
- 2021/22–2022/23: Perth Scorchers (squad no. 34)
- 2022: Oval Invincibles (squad no. 2)
- 2023: Glamorgan (squad no. 34)
- 2023/24-: Hobart Hurricanes
- 2026: Dublin Guardians

Career statistics
Competition	LA	T20
Matches	3	70
Runs scored	5	86
Batting average	5.00	14.33
100s/50s	0/0	0/0
Top score	5*	15
Balls bowled	126	1,441
Wickets	0	65
Bowling average	–	29.41
5 wickets in innings	–	0
10 wickets in match	–	0
Best bowling	–	3/14
Catches/stumpings	0/–	19/–
- Source: Cricinfo, 25 September 2026

Peter Hatzoglou (born 27 November 1998) is an Australian cricketer. Hatzoglou was born in Melbourne, to a father whose family came from Kozani in Greece, and a mother from North Macedonia. He is known for his idiosyncratic bowling action, ability to bowl topspinners, sliders and googlies as well as the ability to bowl from a high release point at high pace.

== Career ==
Hatzoglou was only playing at the local level by the age of 18 and had never appeared in a state cricket age-group team by that time. In 2016, after completing his exams, he joined the Sunshine Heights Cricket Club in Victoria and became club treasurer. He later represented Melbourne University Cricket Cub in 2017 in a third-grade premier cricket tournament. He first appeared in a club cricket match in 2019, when he played for Ashton-on-Mersey Cricket Club as an overseas player in the fourth division of the Cheshire County Cricket League. He ended up in the 2019 Cheshire Cricket League by grabbing 41 scalps at an incredible bowling average of 18.39. He also toured the UK with the Australian Universities XI for a cricket tour in the UK in 2019. It was former Australian cricketer Cameron White who strongly pushed for Hatzoglou's selection after watching him play during a Victorian Premier Cricket match in 2019. He also played for South Australian Premier Cricket team Prospect.

In December 2020, Hatzoglou signed with the Melbourne Renegades. He found his way into the first XI of the Melbourne Renegades squad as a local replacement player for Will Sutherland with the latter having withdrawn from the 2020–21 Big Bash League season after being named in the Australian A squad against the touring Indian test squad during that summer. He received a phone call from Melbourne Renegades coach Michael Klinger in order to get a confirmation on whether he could join the team as a local replacement player. Before his surprise call-up, he was pursuing degrees in both finance and international relations as well as working as a data analyst for the financial services firm, KPMG. He made his Twenty20 debut on 12 December 2020, taking two wickets. He made rapid strides from playing in third-grade premier cricket competitions to top-tier professional cricket competitions within a space of two and half years with a big breakthrough coming at the Big Bash League.

After a successful maiden Big Bash League season, Hatzoglou was called into the South Australia squad for the 2020–21 Marsh One-Day Cup, where he made his List A debut against Western Australia on 2 March 2021. In July 2021, he signed a two-year deal with the Perth Scorchers.

It was revealed that he was advised by former veteran Australian leg spinner Shane Warne to spend the Australian winter season by playing club cricket in the UK in order to be in contention for a contract in The Hundred with the London Spirit team for which Warne served as its head coach. Hatzoglou had messaged Warne in an Instagram chat to seek ideas and advice during the middle of a COVID-19 pandemic induced lockdown in Melbourne in July 2021.

Following his successful BBL stint with Perth Scorchers, he returned to his KPMG office and discussed his plans with two of the firm's partners and made the decision to fly to the UK. He quit his job at KPMG with the intention of pursuing his club cricket career in the UK. He headed for Sawston and Babraham Cricket Club in Cambridge and emerged as the highest wicket-taker in the East Anglian Premier League. He also arranged a number of stints with various county clubs as a net bowler to gain and garner some attention but much to his disappointment, he was ignored by the counties.

In August 2022, Oval Invincibles offered him a short-term contract as a replacement player for Sunil Narine during the 2022 season of The Hundred with the latter decided to opt out of the final stages of the tournament in order to play in the 2022 Caribbean Premier League.
