= Mitchell Perry =

Australian cricketer (born 2000)

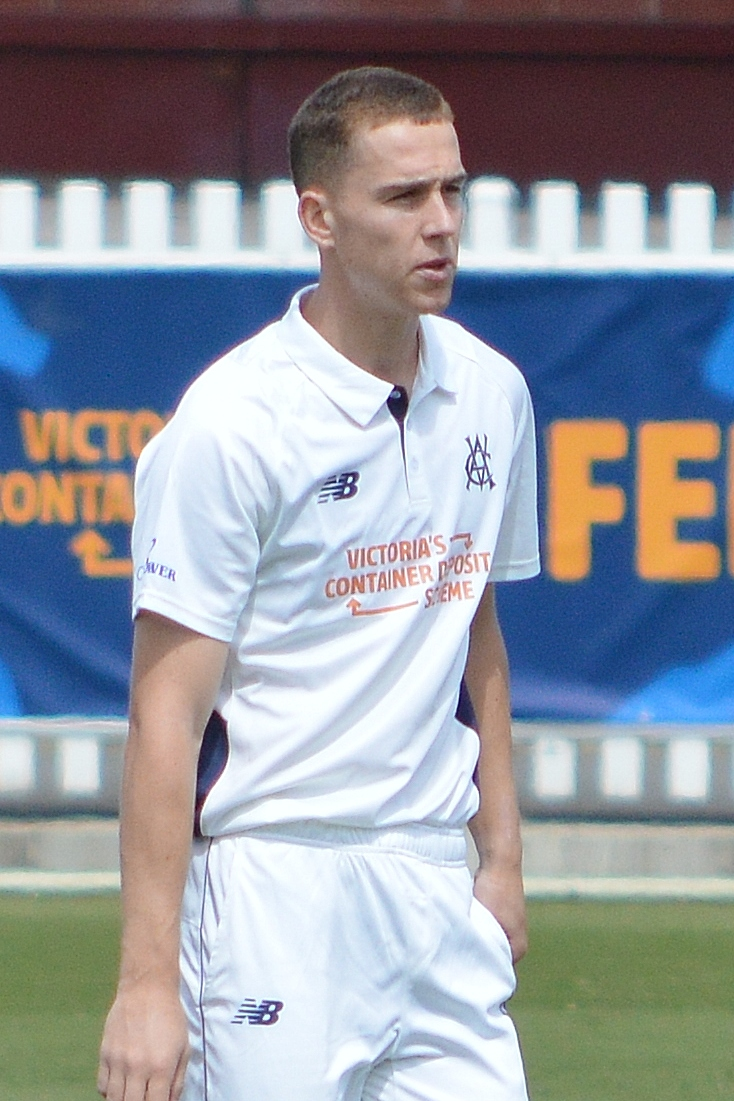
- Perry playing First Class cricket with Victoria in October 2025

Personal information
- Full name: Mitchell Jordan Perry
- Born: 27 April 2000 (age 26); Bacchus Marsh, Victoria, Australia
- Batting: Left-handed
- Bowling: Right-arm fast medium
- Role: Bowler

Domestic team information
- Years: Team
- 2019/20–present: Victoria
- 2020/21: Melbourne Renegades
- 2024/25: Sydney Sixers

Career statistics
Competition	FC	LA	T20
Matches	53	7	5
Runs scored	1,342	33	3
Batting average	19.73	11.00	—
100s/50s	0/5	0/0	0/0
Top score	75	17	3*
Balls bowled	8,613	301	140
Wickets	151	9	4
Bowling average	29.25	36.77	35.00
5 wickets in innings	3	0	0
10 wickets in match	0	0	0
Best bowling	5/33	4/9	1/22
Catches/stumpings	12/–	1/–	3/–
- Source: Cricinfo, 25 October 2026

Mitchell Perry (born 27 April 2000) is an Australian cricketer. He made his List A debut on 19 November 2019, for Victoria in the 2019–20 Marsh One-Day Cup. He made his first-class debut on 30 October 2020, for Victoria in the 2020–21 Sheffield Shield season. He made his Twenty20 debut on 1 January 2021, for the Melbourne Renegades, in the 2020–21 Big Bash League season. In December 2025, Perry agreed to join Lancashire County Cricket Club as an overseas player for the first two months of the 2026 English County Championship season.
