= Liam Hatcher =

Australian cricketer (born 1996)

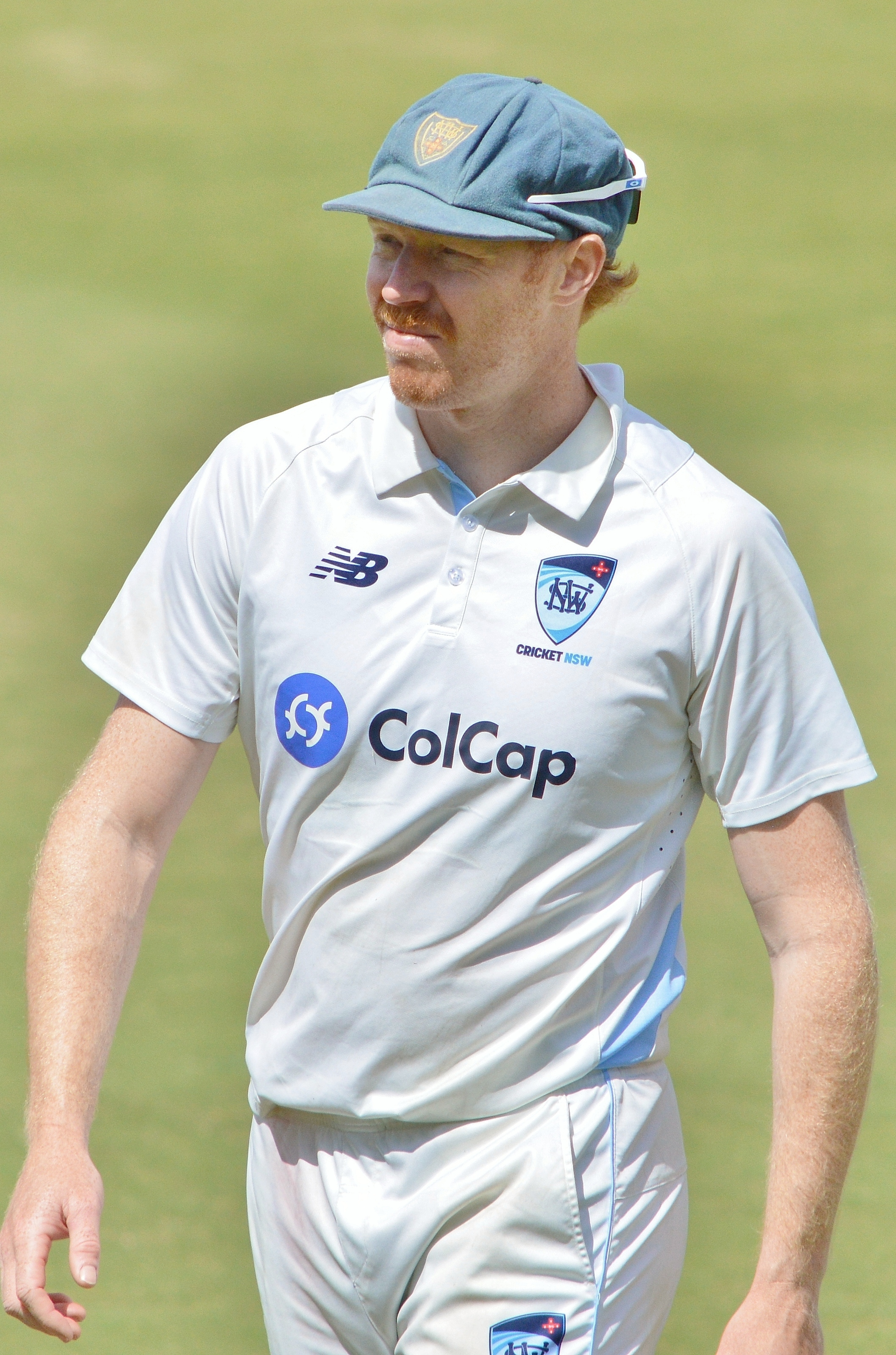
- Hatcher playing First Class cricket with New South Wales in October 2025

Personal information
- Full name: Liam Conor Hatcher
- Born: 17 September 1996 (age 30); Liverpool, New South Wales, Australia
- Batting: Right-handed
- Bowling: Right-arm medium-fast
- Role: Bowler

Domestic team information
- Years: Team
- 2015/16–2016/17: Cricket Australia XI
- 2019/20–present: New South Wales
- 2020/21: Melbourne Stars

Career statistics
Competition	FC	LA	T20
Matches	30	29	25
Runs scored	238	100	46
Batting average	10.34	8.33	7.66
100s/50s	0/0	0/0	0/0
Top score	36*	31	20
Balls bowled	4,756	1,268	5,09
Wickets	105	38	27
Bowling average	28.59	35.13	27.29
5 wickets in innings	2	1	0
10 wickets in match	0	0	0
Best bowling	5/51	6/58	3/25
Catches/stumpings	8/–	9/–	2/–
- Source: Cricinfo, 23 October 2026

Liam Hatcher (born 17 September 1996) is an Australian cricketer. He made his List A debut for Cricket Australia XI on 5 October 2015 in the 2015–16 Matador BBQs One-Day Cup. He made his first-class debut for Cricket Australia XI on 29 October 2015 in a tour match against New Zealanders as part of New Zealand's tour to Australia.

In December 2015 he was named in Australia's squad for the 2016 Under-19 Cricket World Cup. He made his Twenty20 debut on 12 December 2020, for the Melbourne Stars, in the 2020–21 Big Bash League season.
