= Jack Prestwidge =

Australian cricketer (born 1996)

Personal information
- Born: 28 February 1996 (age 30)
- Batting: Right-handed
- Bowling: Right-arm fast-medium
- Role: All-rounder

Domestic team information
- Years: Team
- 2017–2020: Queensland
- 2018–2020: Brisbane Heat
- 2020–2023: Melbourne Renegades
- 2022–2023: Victoria

Career statistics
Competition	FC	List A	T20
Matches	1	5	25
Runs scored	0	43	149
Batting average	-	21.50	14.90
100s/50s	0/0	0/0	0/0
Top score	-	23	33
Balls bowled	30	216	356
Wickets	0	9	17
Bowling average	-	24.66	29.05
5 wickets in innings	0	0	0
10 wickets in match	0	0	0
Best bowling	-	3/52	2/15
Catches/stumpings	0/-	1/-	6/-
- Source: Cricinfo, 14 February 2023

Jack Prestwidge (born 28 February 1996) is an Australian cricketer. He made his List A debut for Queensland in the 2018–19 JLT One-Day Cup on 22 September 2018. He made his Twenty20 debut for the Brisbane Heat in the 2018–19 Big Bash League season on 17 January 2019.

In May 2020, Prestwidge signed with Victorian Premier Cricket club Melbourne, confirming his departure from Queensland.

== Personal life ==
Prestwidge is the son of cricketer Scott Prestwidge. His brother Will Prestwidge, and his sister Georgia Prestwidge, are also cricketers.
