= Zak Evans =

Australian rules footballer (born 2000)

Personal information
- Full name: Zak Kai Evans
- Nickname: Cherry
- Born: 26 March 2000 (age 26); Melbourne, Victoria
- Draft: Category B rookie

Club information
- Current club: Gold Coast
- Number: 36

Playing career
Years	Club	Games (Goals)
2025–	Gold Coast	0 (0)

Zak Evans (born 26 March 2000) is a professional Australian rules footballer who currently plays for the Gold Coast Suns in the Australian Football League (AFL). He previously played first-class and List A cricket for Victoria, and played in the Big Bash League for the Melbourne Renegades.

== Cricket career ==
Cricket information
- Batting: Right-handed
- Bowling: Right-arm fast
- Role: Bowler

Domestic team information
- Years: Team
- 2018/2019–: Victoria
- 2018/2019–: Melbourne Renegades

Career statistics
Competition	FC	LA	T20
Matches	1	2	10
Runs scored	0	7	8
Batting average	—	3.50	4.00
100s/50s	0/0	0/0	0/0
Top score	0	6	6
Balls bowled	186	102	168
Wickets	1	2	13
Bowling average	105.00	50.50	21.61
5 wickets in innings	0	0	1
10 wickets in match	0	0	0
Best bowling	1/31	2/68	5/33
Catches/stumpings	0/–	0/–	7/–
- Source: Cricinfo, 4 October 2021

Evans made his Twenty20 debut on 27 January 2020, for the Melbourne Renegades in the 2019–20 Big Bash League season. Prior to his T20 debut, he was named in Australia's squad for the 2018 Under-19 Cricket World Cup. He made his first-class debut on 30 October 2020, for Victoria in the 2020–21 Sheffield Shield season. He made his List A debut on 15 January 2021, for Victoria in the 2020–21 Marsh One-Day Cup.

Evans was delisted from Victoria's contract list ahead of the 2023-24 season. Evans spent the winter playing club cricket in Essex in the hope of pushing for more Sheffield Shield opportunities the following season despite the loss of his contract, however these opportunities were not forthcoming.

== AFL career ==
Following the end of his professional cricket career, Evans was signed by the Gold Coast Suns as a Category B rookie to play in the Australian Football League (AFL) for the 2025 season. Evans had played junior football before committing to pursuing a career in cricket, with his last competitive football match being in 2018 while playing for Xavier College.
