= 2021–22 Adelaide Strikers season =

Overview of Adelaide Strikers in 2021–22

Adelaide Strikers
2021–22 season
- Coach: Jason Gillespie
- Captain(s): Travis Head
- Home ground: Adelaide Oval
- BBL Season: 4th
- BBL Playoffs: Playoffs (3rd)
- Leading Run Scorer: Jonathan Wells (501)
- Leading Wicket Taker: Peter Siddle (30)

The 2021–22 Adelaide Strikers season was the eleventh in the club's history. The team was coached by Jason Gillespie and captained by Travis Head, they competed in the BBL's 2021–22 season.

== Standings ==
Pos	Team	Pld	W	L	NR	BP	Pts	NRR	Qualification
1	Perth Scorchers (C)	14	11	3	0	7	40	0.926	Advanced to play-off phase
2	Sydney Sixers	14	9	4	1	6	35	1.027	Advanced to play-off phase
3	Sydney Thunder	14	9	5	0	8	35	0.725	Advanced to play-off phase
4	Adelaide Strikers	14	6	8	0	10	28	0.237	Advanced to play-off phase
5	Hobart Hurricanes	14	7	7	0	6	27	−0.332	Advanced to play-off phase
6	Melbourne Stars	14	7	7	0	5	26	−0.222	
7	Brisbane Heat	14	3	11	0	7	16	−0.910	
8	Melbourne Renegades	14	3	10	1	5	16	−1.477	

Source: ESPNcricinfo
(C) Champions

== Regular season ==
Match 3
7 December 2021
19:15 (N)
Scorecard

(H) Melbourne Renegades; 9/153 (20 overs)	v	Adelaide Strikers; 8/151 (20 overs)
Mackenzie Harvey 56 (46); Peter Siddle 3/42 (4 overs)		Harry Nielsen 30 (30); Zahir Khan 3/24 (4 overs)

Melbourne Renegades won by 2 runs
Marvel Stadium, Melbourne
Attendance: 8,932
Umpires: Phillip Gillespie and Michael Graham-Smith
Player of the match: Zahir Khan (Melbourne Renegades)

- Melbourne Renegades won the toss and elected to bat.
- James Seymour (Melbourne Renegades) and Daniel Drew (Adelaide Strikers) both made their T20 debuts.

Match 6
9 December 2021
18:45 (N)
Scorecard

(H) Adelaide Strikers; 149 (19 overs)	v	Melbourne Renegades; 100 (18.4 overs)
Jonathan Wells 37 (30); Kane Richardson 4/32 (4 overs)		Sam Harper 33 (31); Wes Agar 3/17 (3 overs)

Adelaide Strikers won by 49 runs
Adelaide Oval, Adelaide
Attendance: 8,408
Umpires: Michael Graham-Smith and Ben Treloar
Player of the match: Wes Agar (Adelaide Strikers)

- Adelaide Strikers won the toss and elected to bat.

Match 9
11 December 2021
21:30 (N)
Scorecard

(H) Perth Scorchers; 1/195 (20 overs)	v	Adelaide Strikers; 146 (17.5 overs)
Colin Munro 114* (73)		Matthew Short 63 (47); Andrew Tye 3/21 (3 overs)

Perth Scorchers won by 49 runs
Sydney Showground Stadium, Sydney
Attendance: Closed Event
Umpires: Nathan Johnstone and Tony Wilds
Player of the match: Colin Munro (Perth Scorchers)

- Perth Scorchers won the toss and elected to bat.
- Thomas Kelly (Adelaide Strikers) made his T20 debut.
- X-factor subs: Liam Scott (Adelaide Strikers) replaced Wes Agar.

Match 16
21 December 2021
19:15 (N)
Scorecard

Adelaide Strikers; 8/147 (20 overs)	v	Sydney Sixers (H); 6/150 (19.2 overs)
Thomas Kelly 41 (34); Dan Christian 3/8 (3 overs)		Jordan Silk 36 (24); Rashid Khan 3/20 (4 overs)

Sydney Sixers won by 4 wickets
Sydney Cricket Ground, Sydney
Attendance: 8,359
Umpires: Bruce Oxenford and David Taylor
Player of the match: Sean Abbott (Sydney Sixers)

- Adelaide Strikers won the toss and elected to bat.

Match 18
23 December 2021
18:45 (N)
Scorecard

Brisbane Heat; 7/208 (20 overs)	v	Adelaide Strikers (H); 8/169 (20 overs)
Ben Duckett 78 (47); Rashid Khan 3/34 (4 overs)		Jonathan Wells 55 (41); Mark Steketee 3/27 (4 overs)

Brisbane Heat won by 39 runs
Adelaide Oval, Adelaide
Attendance: 7,581
Umpires: Nathan Johnstone and Bruce Oxenford
Player of the match: Ben Duckett (Brisbane Heat)

- Brisbane Heat won the toss and elected to bat.

Match 22
27 December 2021
18:05 (N)
Scorecard

Adelaide Strikers; 5/175 (20 overs)	v	Hobart Hurricanes (H); 3/176 (18.3 overs)
Matt Renshaw 63 (41); Riley Meredith 3/37 (4 overs)		Ben McDermott 110* (60); Peter Siddle 1/25 (3 overs)

Hobart Hurricanes won by 7 wickets
Blundstone Arena, Hobart
Attendance: 4,896
Umpires: Simon Lightbody and Sam Nogajski
Player of the match: Ben McDermott (Hobart Hurricanes)

- Adelaide Strikers won the toss and elected to bat.

Match 28
31 December 2021
18:45 (N)
Scorecard

Sydney Thunder; 3/187 (20 overs)	v	Adelaide Strikers (H); 7/165 (20 overs)
Jason Sangha 91* (55); Fawad Ahmed 1/22 (4 overs)		Jonathan Wells 46 (26); Daniel Sams 4/33 (4 overs)

Sydney Thunder won by 22 runs
Adelaide Oval, Adelaide
Attendance: 9,555
Umpires: Darren Close and Greg Davidson
Player of the match: Jason Sangha (Sydney Thunder)

- Sydney Thunder won the toss and elected to bat.

Match 32
2 January 2022
19:15 (N)
Scorecard

(H) Sydney Thunder; 7/172 (20 overs)	v	Adelaide Strikers; 144 (19.1 overs)
Matthew Gilkes 93 (57); Wes Agar 3/26 (4 overs)		Harry Nielsen 39 (31); Mohammad Hasnain 3/20 (4 overs)

Sydney Thunder won by 28 runs
Sydney Showground Stadium, Sydney
Umpires: Gerard Abood and Simon Lightbody
Player of the match: Matthew Gilkes (Sydney Thunder)

- Sydney Thunder won the toss and elected to bat.
- Henry Hunt (Adelaide Strikers) made his T20 debut.

Match 35
5 January 2022
18:45 (N)
Scorecard

Hobart Hurricanes; 126 (19.5 overs)	v	Adelaide Strikers (H); 3/129 (15.1 overs)
D'Arcy Short 32 (32); Peter Siddle 5/23 (3.5 overs)		Matthew Short 72* (44); Sandeep Lamichhane 2/22 (4 overs)

Adelaide Strikers won by 7 wickets
Adelaide Oval, Adelaide
Umpires: Phillip Gillespie and Tony Wilds
Player of the match: Matthew Short (Adelaide Strikers)

- Adelaide Strikers won the toss and elected to field.
- X-factor subs: Mac Wright (Hobart Hurricanes) replaced Wil Parker.

Match 44
10 January 2022
19:15 (N)
Scorecard

Adelaide Strikers; 9/139 (20 overs)	v	Melbourne Stars (H); 5/140 (19.1 overs)
Jonathan Wells 68 (56); Qais Ahmad 2/21 (4 overs)		Joe Clarke 83 (58); Peter Siddle 2/26 (4 overs)

Melbourne Stars won by 5 wickets
Melbourne Cricket Ground, Melbourne
Attendance: 5,802
Umpires: Nathan Johnstone and Troy Penman
Player of the match: Joe Clarke (Melbourne Stars)

- Melbourne Stars won the toss and elected to field.

Match 46
12 January 2022
18:15 (N)
Scorecard

Adelaide Strikers; 4/161 (20 overs)	v	Brisbane Heat (H); 90 (15 overs)
Jake Weatherald 35 (31); Will Prestwidge 2/34 (4 overs)		Ben Duckett 24 (18); Rashid Khan 6/17 (4 overs)

Adelaide Strikers won by 71 runs
The Gabba, Brisbane
Umpires: Phillip Gillespie and Simon Lightbody
Player of the match: Rashid Khan (Adelaide Strikers)

- Adelaide Strikers won the toss and elected to bat.

Match 49
14 January 2022
10:10
Scorecard

Perth Scorchers; 9/127 (20 overs)	v	Adelaide Strikers (H); 4/130 (17 overs)
Laurie Evans 39 (31); Fawad Ahmed 3/30 (4 overs)		Ian Cockbain 35* (24); Aaron Hardie 3/31 (4 overs)

Adelaide Strikers won by 6 wickets
Adelaide Oval, Adelaide
Umpires: Michael Graham-Smith and Bruce Oxenford
Player of the match: Fawad Ahmed (Adelaide Strikers)

- Adelaide Strikers won the toss and elected to field.

Match 39 (Note: Originally the match was scheduled to be played on 7 January 2022 but was postponed due to COVID-19 cases in Melbourne Stars' squad.)
15 January 2022
10:10
Scorecard

(H) Adelaide Strikers; 6/155 (20 overs)	v	Melbourne Stars; 8/132 (20 overs)
Jonathan Wells 73 (49); Clint Hinchliffe 2/21 (3 overs)		Hilton Cartwright 49 (35); Henry Thornton 4/26 (4 overs)

Adelaide Strikers won by 23 runs
Adelaide Oval, Adelaide
Attendance: 3,511
Umpires: Bruce Oxenford and Michael Graham-Smith
Player of the match: Henry Thornton (Adelaide Strikers)

- Melbourne Stars won the toss and elected to field.

Match 52
17 January 2022
16:35 (D/N)
Scorecard

Sydney Sixers; 7/161 (20 overs)	v	Adelaide Strikers (H); 2/165 (17.3 overs)
Justin Avendano 52 (29); Fawad Ahmed 3/16 (4 overs)		Ian Cockbain 71* (42); Ben Dwarshuis 1/37 (3 overs)

Adelaide Strikers won by 8 wickets
Adelaide Oval, Adelaide
Umpires: Darren Close and Phillip Gillespie
Player of the match: Ian Cockbain (Adelaide Strikers)

- Sydney Sixers won the toss and elected to bat.
- Ben Dwarshuis (Sydney Sixers) took his 100th BBL wicket, becoming the first player to do so whilst representing one team and fifth player overall.

== Playoffs ==
Eliminator
21 January 2022
19:15 (N)
Scorecard

(H) Adelaide Strikers; 6/188 (20 overs)	v	Hobart Hurricanes; 166 (19.4 overs)
Matthew Short 89 (48); Riley Meredith 2/37 (4 overs); Tom Rogers 2/37 (4 overs)		D’Arcy Short 56 (34); Peter Siddle 4/32 (3.4 overs)

Adelaide Strikers won by 22 runs
Melbourne Cricket Ground, Melbourne
Umpires: Phillip Gillespie and Donovan Koch
Player of the match: Matthew Short (Adelaide Strikers)

- Adelaide Strikers won the toss and elected to bat.

Knockout
23 January 2022
19:15 (N)
Scorecard

Adelaide Strikers; 6/184 (20 overs)	v	Sydney Thunder (H); 6/178 (20 overs)
Ian Cockbain 65 (38); Tanveer Sangha 2/15 (4 overs)		Jason Sangha 61 (43); Harry Conway 2/33 (4 overs)

Adelaide Strikers won by 6 runs
Melbourne Cricket Ground, Melbourne
Umpires: Phillip Gillespie and Donovan Koch
Player of the match: Ian Cockbain (Adelaide Strikers)

- Adelaide Strikers won the toss and elected to bat.

Challenger
26 January 2022
19:25 (N)
Scorecard

Adelaide Strikers; 4/167 (20 overs)	v	Sydney Sixers (H); 6/170 (20 overs)
Jonathan Wells 62* (47); Sean Abbott 3/27 (4 overs)		Hayden Kerr 98* (58); Harry Conway 2/37 (4 overs)

Sydney Sixers won by 4 wickets
Sydney Cricket Ground, Sydney
Umpires: Donovan Koch and Sam Nogajski
Player of the match: Hayden Kerr (Sydney Sixers)

- Sydney Sixers won the toss and elected to field.
- Jake Carder (Sydney Sixers) made his T20 debut.

== Squad information ==
- Players with international caps are listed in **bold**.
- Ages are given as of the first match of the tournament, 5 December 2021

No.	Name	Nationality	Date of birth (age)	Batting style	Bowling style	Notes
Batsmen
1	**Phil Salt**	England	28 August 1996 (aged 25)	Right-handed	Right-arm medium	Visa contract
28	Jake Weatherald	Australia	4 November 1994 (aged 27)	Left-handed	Right-arm leg spin	
29	Jon Wells	Australia	13 August 1988 (aged 33)	Right-handed	Right-arm medium	
34	**Travis Head**	Australia	29 December 1993 (aged 27)	Left-handed	Right-arm off spin	Captain
77	**Matt Renshaw**	Australia	28 March 1996 (aged 25)	Left-handed	Right-arm off spin	
88	Ryan Gibson	Australia	30 December 1993 (aged 27)	Right-handed	Right-arm leg spin	
All-rounders
2	Matt Short	Australia	8 November 1995 (aged 26)	Right-handed	Right-arm off spin	
6	Cameron Valente	Australia	6 September 1994 (aged 27)	Right-handed	Right-arm medium-fast	
12	Liam Scott	Australia	12 December 2000 (aged 20)	Right-handed	Right-arm fast-medium	
Wicket-keepers
4	Harry Nielsen	Australia	3 May 1995 (aged 26)	Right-handed	–	
5	**Alex Carey**	Australia	27 August 1991 (aged 30)	Left-handed	–	Vice captain
Bowlers
9	Liam O'Connor	Australia	20 June 1993 (aged 28)	Right-handed	Right-arm leg spin	
11	**Daniel Worrall**	Australia	10 July 1991 (aged 30)	Right-handed	Right-arm fast medium	
13	Harry Conway	Australia	17 September 1992 (aged 29)	Right-handed	Right-arm fast medium	
14	**Danny Briggs**	England	30 April 1991 (aged 30)	Right-handed	Left-arm orthodox	Visa contract
19	**Rashid Khan**	Afghanistan	20 September 1998 (aged 23)	Right-handed	Right-arm leg spin	Visa contract
21	**Wes Agar**	Australia	5 February 1997 (aged 24)	Right-handed	Right-arm fast	
42	Spencer Johnson	Australia	6 December 1995 (aged 25)	Left-handed	Left-arm fast-medium	
64	**Peter Siddle**	Australia	25 November 1984 (aged 37)	Right-handed	Right-arm fast medium	
