= 2022–23 Adelaide Strikers season =

Overview of Adelaide Strikers in 2022–23

Adelaide Strikers
2022–23 season
- Coach: Jason Gillespie
- Captain(s): Travis Head; Peter Siddle (Acting)
- Home ground: Adelaide Oval
- Highest home attendance: 40,373
- Lowest home attendance: 12,621
- Average home attendance: 21,105

The 2022–23 Adelaide Strikers season was the twelfth in the club's history. The team was coached by Jason Gillespie and captained by Travis Head, they competed in the BBL's 2022–23 season.

== Standings ==
Pos	Team	Pld	W	L	NR	Pts	NRR	Qualification
1	Perth Scorchers (C)	14	11	3	0	22	1.205	Advanced to play-off phase
2	Sydney Sixers	14	10	3	1	21	0.846	Advanced to play-off phase
3	Melbourne Renegades	14	7	7	0	14	−0.027	Advanced to play-off phase
4	Sydney Thunder	14	7	7	0	14	−0.716	Advanced to play-off phase
5	Brisbane Heat	14	6	7	1	13	−0.483	Advanced to play-off phase
6	Hobart Hurricanes	14	6	8	0	12	−0.340	
7	Adelaide Strikers	14	5	9	0	10	−0.151	
8	Melbourne Stars	14	3	11	0	6	−0.287	

Source: ESPNcricinfo
(C) Champions

== Regular season ==
Match 2
14 December 2022
19:15 (N)
Scorecard

Adelaide Strikers (H); 184/6 (20 overs)	v	Sydney Sixers; 133/7 (20 overs)
Matthew Short 84 (53); Sean Abbott 3/37 (4 overs)		Jordan Silk 36 (25); Henry Thornton 4/20 (4 overs)

Adelaide Strikers won by 51 runs
Adelaide Oval, Adelaide
Attendance: 12,621
Umpires: Bruce Oxenford and Eloise Sheridan
Player of the match: Matthew Short (Adelaide Strikers)

- Adelaide Strikers won the toss and elected to bat.

Match 5
16 December 2022
20:15 (N)
Scorecard

Adelaide Strikers; 9/139 (20 overs)	v	Sydney Thunder (H); 15 (5.5 overs)
Chris Lynn 36 (27); Fazalhaq Farooqi 3/20 (4 overs)		Brendan Doggett 4 (2); Henry Thornton 5/3 (2.5 overs)

Adelaide Strikers won by 124 runs
Sydney Showground Stadium, Sydney
Attendance:
Attendance: 6,103
Umpires: Simon Lightbody and Sam Nogajski
Player of the match: Henry Thornton (Adelaide Strikers)

- Adelaide Strikers won the toss and elected to bat.
- Thunder's 15 all out is the lowest score in a completed innings in a men's professional T20. At 35 balls, it was also the shortest completed innings in all men's professional T20s.

Match 9
20 December 2022
18:45 (N)
Scorecard

Sydney Thunder; 5/150 (20 overs)	v	Adelaide Strikers (H); 4/151 (18.4 overs)
Alex Hales 68 (50); Henry Thornton 2/18 (3 overs)		Matthew Short 65 (44); Nathan McAndrew 2/25 (4 overs)

Adelaide Strikers won by 6 wickets
Adelaide Oval, Adelaide
Attendance: 17,134
Umpires: Gerard Abood and Shawn Craig
Player of the match: Matthew Short (Adelaide Strikers)

- Sydney Thunder won the toss and elected to bat.

Match 13
23 December 2022
18:00 (N)
Scorecard

(H) Brisbane Heat; 9/166 (20 overs)	v	Adelaide Strikers; 9/160 (20 overs)
Sam Billings 79 (48); Matt Short 3/14 (3 overs)		Thomas Kelly 43 (33); Mark Steketee 4/34 (4 overs)

Brisbane Heat won by 6 runs
The Gabba, Brisbane
Attendance: 17,283
Umpires: Greg Davidson and Sharad Patel
Player of the match: Sam Billings (Brisbane Heat)

- Brisbane Heat won the toss and elected to bat.

Match 16
26 December 2022
18:15 (N)
Scorecard

Adelaide Strikers; 7/133 (20 overs)	v	Perth Scorchers (H); 7/136 (19.1 overs)
Chris Lynn 35 (34); Andrew Tye 3/30 (4 overs)		Ashton Turner 48* (38); Matt Short 2/11 (2 overs)

Perth Scorchers won by 3 wickets
Perth Stadium, Perth
Attendance: 26,211
Umpires: Gerard Abood and Nathan Johnstone
Player of the match: Ashton Turner (Perth Scorchers)

- Adelaide Strikers won the toss and elected to bat.

Match 23
31 December 2022
18:30 (N)
Scorecard

Melbourne Stars; 7/186 (20 overs)	v	Adelaide Strikers (H); 5/178 (20 overs)
Marcus Stoinis 74 (35); Wes Agar 3/27 (4 overs)		Adam Hose 56* (41); Liam Hatcher 2/29 (4 overs)

Melbourne Stars won by 8 runs
Adelaide Oval, Adelaide
Attendance: 40,373
Umpires: Ben Treloar and Simon Lightbody
Player of the match: Marcus Stoinis (Melbourne Stars)

- Melbourne Stars won the toss and elected to bat.

Match 26
2 January 2023
19:15 (N)
Scorecard

Adelaide Strikers; 6/177 (20 overs)	v	Hobart Hurricanes (H); 3/178 (17.2 overs)
Chris Lynn 87 (58); Nathan Ellis 2/39 (4 overs)		Caleb Jewell 54 (28); Peter Siddle 1/21 (4 overs)

Hobart Hurricanes won by 7 wickets
Bellerive Oval, Hobart
Attendance: 6,113
Umpires: Sam Nogajski and Michael Graham-Smith
Player of the match: Caleb Jewell (Hobart Hurricanes)

- Adelaide Strikers won the toss and elected to bat.

Match 30
5 January 2023
18:45 (N)
Scorecard

Hobart Hurricanes; 4/229 (20 overs)	v	Adelaide Strikers (H); 3/230 (19.3 overs)
Ben McDermott 57 (30); Colin de Grandhomme 2/45 (4 overs)		Matt Short 100* (59); Patrick Dooley 2/25 (4 overs)

Adelaide Strikers won by 7 wickets
Adelaide Oval, Adelaide
Attendance: 21,727
Umpires: Bruce Oxenford and Paul Wilson
Player of the match: Matt Short (Adelaide Strikers)

- Adelaide Strikers won the toss and elected to field.

Match 36
10 January 2023
19:10 (N)
Scorecard

(H) Adelaide Strikers; 4/202 (20 overs)	v	Melbourne Renegades; 6/182 (20 overs)
Chris Lynn 69* (37); Ruwantha Kellepotha 2/32 (4 overs)		Sam Harper 63 (36); Matt Short 2/26 (4 overs); Wes Agar 2/26 (4 overs)

Adelaide Strikers won by 20 runs
Adelaide Oval, Adelaide
Attendance: 21,345
Umpires: Claire Polosak and Shawn Craig
Player of the match: Chris Lynn (Adelaide Strikers)

- Melbourne Renegades won the toss and elected to field
- Ruwantha Kellepotha made his T20 debut.

Match 38
12 January 2023
19:15 (N)
Scorecard

Adelaide Strikers; 108 (19.2 overs)	v	Melbourne Stars (H); 1/109 (14.3 overs)
Harry Nielsen 40 (33); Nathan Coulter-Nile 3/17 (4 overs)		Tom Rogers 51* (45)

Melbourne Stars won by 9 wickets
Melbourne Cricket Ground, Melbourne
Attendance: 16,224
Umpires: Donovan Koch and David Taylor
Player of the match: Liam Hatcher (Melbourne Stars)

- Melbourne Stars won the toss and elected to field.

Match 40
14 January 2023
15:30 (N)
Scorecard

Brisbane Heat; 154 (19.3 overs)	v	Adelaide Strikers (H); 9/137 (20 overs)
Marnus Labuschagne 46 (33); Harry Conway 3/36 (3.3 overs)		Matthew Short 39 (30); James Bazley 3/30 (4 overs)

Brisbane Heat won by 17 runs
Adelaide Oval, Adelaide
Attendance: 14,785
Umpires: Shawn Craig and Phillip Gillespie
Player of the match: Matthew Kuhnemann (Brisbane Heat)

- Adelaide Strikers won the toss and elected to field.

Match 45
17 January 2023
19:15 (N)
Scorecard

(H) Sydney Sixers; 5/203 (20 overs)	v	Adelaide Strikers; 144 (19 overs)
Steve Smith 101 (56); Wes Agar 2/48 (4 overs)		Alex Carey 54 (35); Ben Dwarshuis 3/28 (4 overs)

Sydney Sixers won by 59 runs
Coffs Harbour International Stadium, Coffs Harbour
Attendance: 9,576
Umpires: Simon Lightbody and Bruce Oxenford
Player of the match: Steve Smith (Sydney Sixers)

- Adelaide Strikers won the toss and elected to field.

Match 48
20 January 2023
16:00 (N)
Scorecard

(H) Adelaide Strikers; 92 (17 overs)	v	Perth Scorchers; 3/94 (11.1 overs)
Adam Hose 30 (23); Peter Hatzoglou 3/14 (3 overs)		Aaron Hardie 43 (30); Cameron Boyce 2/12 (3 overs)

Perth Scorchers won by 7 wickets
Adelaide Oval, Adelaide
Attendance: 19,751
Umpires: Nathan Johnstone and Troy Penman
Player of the match: David Payne (Perth Scorchers)

- Adelaide Strikers won the toss and elected to bat.

== Season statistics ==
=== Batting ===
Most runs
Batsmen	Inns	Runs
Chris Lynn	11	415
Matt Short	11	398
Adam Hose	11	249
Colin de Grandhomme	10	217
Thomas Kelly	7	80

As of 14 January 2023

Highest individual score
Batsmen	Runs	Balls	Opposition
Matt Short	100*	59	Hobart Hurricanes
Chris Lynn	87	58	Hobart Hurricanes
Matt Short	84	53	Sydney Sixers
Chris Lynn	69*	37	Melbourne Renegades
Matt Short	65	44	Sydney Thunder

As of 14 January 2023

=== Bowling ===
Most wickets
Bowler	Mat	Wkts
Henry Thornton	7	16
Wes Agar	9	14
Matt Short	11	9
Rashid Khan	9	5
Colin de Grandhomme	10	5

As of 23 December 2022

== Current squad ==
The current squad of the Adelaide Strikers for the 2022–23 Big Bash League season as of 6 December 2022.

- Players with international caps are listed in **bold**
- Ages are given as of the opening match of the tournament, 13 December 2022
- * denotes a player who is currently unavailable for selection.
- * denotes a player who is unavailable for rest of the season.

S/N	Name	Nationality	Date of birth (age)	Batting style	Bowling style	Notes
Batsmen
21	Adam Hose	England	25 October 1992 (aged 30)	Right-handed	Right-arm medium-fast	Overseas player
22	Henry Hunt	Australia	7 January 1997 (aged 25)	Right-handed	Right-arm medium	
31	Thomas Kelly	Australia	14 December 2000 (aged 21)	Right-handed	Right-arm off break	
34	**Travis Head**	Australia	29 December 1993 (aged 28)	Left-handed	Right-arm off break	International Cap
50	**Chris Lynn**	Australia	10 April 1990 (aged 32)	Right-handed	Slow left arm orthodox	International Cap
88	Ryan Gibson	Australia	30 December 1993 (aged 28)	Right-handed	Right-arm leg break	
2	Matt Short	Australia	8 November 1995 (aged 27)	Right-handed	Right-arm off break	
28	Jake Weatherald	Australia	4 November 1994 (aged 28)	Left-handed	Right-arm leg spin	
All-rounders
77	**Colin de Grandhomme**	New Zealand	22 July 1986 (aged 36)	Right-handed	Right-arm medium-fast	Overseas player & International Cap
19	**Rashid Khan**	Afghanistan	20 September 1998 (aged 24)	Right-handed	Right-arm leg break	Overseas player & International Cap
Wicket-Keepers
5	**Alex Carey**	Australia	27 August 1991 (aged 31)	Left-handed	—	International Cap
4	Harry Nielsen	Australia	3 May 1995 (aged 27)	Right-handed	—	
Spin Bowlers
13	**Cameron Boyce**	Australia	27 July 1989 (aged 33)	Right-handed	Right-arm leg break	International Cap
26	Ben Manenti	Australia	23 March 1997 (aged 25)	Right-handed	Right-arm off break	
Pace Bowlers
9	**Wes Agar**	Australia	5 February 1997 (aged 25)	Right-handed	Right-arm fast	International Cap
13	Harry Conway	Australia	17 September 1992 (aged 30)	Right-handed	Right-arm fast-medium	
64	**Peter Siddle**	Australia	25 November 1984 (aged 38)	Right-handed	Right-arm fast-medium	International Cap
58	Henry Thornton	Australia	16 December 1996 (aged 25)	Right-handed	Right-arm fast-medium	
