= 2023–24 Adelaide Strikers season =

Adelaide Strikers
2023–24 season
- Coach: Jason Gillespie
- Captain(s): Travis Head
- Home ground: Adelaide Oval
- League: BBL
- Record: 4th
- BBL finals: 3rd Place
- Leading Run Scorer: Matt Short (541)

The 2023–24 Adelaide Strikers season was the eleventh in the club's history. The team was coached by Jason Gillespie and captained by Travis Head, they competed in the BBL's 2023–24 season.

The Adelaide Strikers are an Australian men's professional Twenty20 franchise cricket team that competes in the Big Bash League. The Striker wears a teal uniform and are based in Adelaide in the Australian state of Southern Australia. Their home ground is the Adelaide Oval.

== Standings ==
Pos	Team	Pld	W	L	NR	Pts	NRR	Qualification
1	Brisbane Heat (C)	10	7	1	2	16	0.972	Advanced to Qualifier
2	Sydney Sixers	10	6	2	2	14	0.339	Advanced to Qualifier
3	Perth Scorchers	10	6	3	1	13	0.725	Advanced to Knockout
4	Adelaide Strikers	10	5	4	1	11	0.331	Advanced to Knockout
5	Hobart Hurricanes	10	4	6	0	8	−0.268	
6	Melbourne Stars	10	4	6	0	8	−1.051	
7	Melbourne Renegades	10	2	6	2	6	−0.289	
8	Sydney Thunder	10	1	7	2	4	−0.652	

Source: ESPNcricinfo
(C) Champions

== Fixture ==
Match 3
9 December 2023
19:15 (N)
Scorecard

Adelaide Strikers	v	Brisbane Heat

Match abandoned without a ball bowled
Adelaide Oval, Adelaide
Attendance: TBA
Umpires: Shawn Craig and Nathan Johnstone

- No toss.
- No play was possible due to rain.

Match 8
19 December 2023
19:15 (N)
Scorecard

Sydney Thunder; 7/200 (20 overs)	v	Adelaide Strikers; 4/205 (19.4 overs)
Cameron Bancroft 74 (54); Jamie Overton 2/29 (4 overs)		Matthew Short 82 (41); Tanveer Sangha 1/33 (4 overs)

Adelaide Strikers won by 6 wickets
Adelaide Oval, Adelaide
Attendance: 20,748
Umpires: Greg Davidson and Phillip Gillespie
Player of the match: Matthew Short (Adelaide Strikers)

- Sydney Thunder won the toss and elected to bat.

Match 11
22 December 2023
19:15 (N)
Scorecard

Sydney Sixers; 7/155 (20 overs)	v	Adelaide Strikers; 6/154 (20 overs)
Jordan Silk 66* (45); Jamie Overton 3/23 (4 overs)		Matthew Short 55 (48); Moises Henriques 2/11 (2 overs)

Sydney Sixers won by 1 run
Sydney Cricket Ground, Sydney
Umpires: Donovan Koch and Gerard Abood
Player of the match: Jordan Silk (Sydney Sixers)

- Adelaide Strikers won the toss and elected to field.

Match 18
29 December 2023
19:15 (N)
Scorecard

Adelaide Strikers; 6/177 (20 overs)	v	Melbourne Renegades; 6/178 (18.4 overs)
Chris Lynn 56 (34); Mujeeb Ur Rahman 3/20 (4 overs)		Jake Fraser-McGurk 70 (37); David Payne 3/37 (3.4 overs)

Melbourne Renegades won by 4 wickets
Docklands Stadium, Melbourne
Umpires: Gerard Abood and Bruce Oxenford
Player of the match: Jake Fraser-McGurk (Melbourne Renegades)

- Adelaide Strikers won the toss and elected to bat.

Match 20
31 December 2023
19:15 (N)
Scorecard

Adelaide Strikers; 4/205 (20 overs)	v	Melbourne Stars; 3/211 (19 overs)
Chris Lynn 83* (42); Glenn Maxwell 2/21 (3 overs)		Beau Webster 66* (48); Cameron Boyce 1/15 (4 overs)

Melbourne Stars won by 7 wickets
Adelaide Oval, Adelaide
Attendance: 42,504
Umpires: Shawn Craig and Michael Graham-Smith
Player of the match: Marcus Stoinis (Melbourne Stars)

- Melbourne Stars won the toss and elected to field.

Match 25
3 January 2024
18:15 (N)
Scorecard

Perth Scorchers; 4/211 (20 overs)	v	Adelaide Strikers; 169 (19.2 overs)
Laurie Evans 85* (28); Henry Thornton 2/31 (4 overs)		Matthew Short 74 (44); Lance Morris 5/24 (4 overs)

Perth Scorchers won by 42 runs
Perth Stadium, Perth
Attendance: 41,576
Umpires: Gerard Abood and Ben Treloar
Player of the match: Laurie Evans (Perth Scorchers)

- Adelaide Strikers won the toss and elected to field.

Match 27
5 January 2024
18:45 (N)
Scorecard

Perth Scorchers; 7/153 (20 overs)	v	Adelaide Strikers; 1/154 (16.1 overs)
Josh Inglis 39 (25); David Payne 2/22 (3 overs)		Matthew Short 76* (51); Lance Morris 1/25 (3 overs)

Adelaide Strikers won by 9 wickets
Adelaide Oval, Adelaide
Attendance: –
Umpires: Andrew Crozier and Michael Graham-Smith
Player of the match: Matthew Short (Adelaide strikers)

- Adelaide Strikers won the toss and elected to field.

Match 31
9 January 2024
19:10 (N)
Scorecard

Hobart Hurricanes; 7/165 (20 overs)	v	Adelaide Strikers; 5/168 (19.2 overs)
Ben McDermott 95* (61); Jamie Overton 3/23 (4 overs)		Matthew Short 45 (32); Nathan Ellis 2/44 (4 overs)

Adelaide Strikers won by 5 wickets
Adelaide Oval, Adelaide
Attendance: –
Umpires: Sam Nogajski and Nathan Johnstone
Player of the match: Cameron Boyce (Adelaide Strikers)

- Adelaide Strikers won the toss and elected to field.

Match 33
11 January 2024
19:15 (N)
Scorecard

Hobart Hurricanes; 6/167 (20 overs)	v	Adelaide Strikers; 2/169 (15.5 overs)
Mac Wright 37 (27); Cameron Boyce 2/17 (4 overs)		Jake Weatherald 80* (32); Nikhil Chaudhary 1/18 (3 overs)

Adelaide Strikers won by 8 wickets
Blundstone Arena, Hobart
Attendance: –
Umpires: Sam Nogajski and Sharad Patel
Player of the match: Jake Weatherald (Adelaide Strikers)

- Adelaide Strikers won the toss and elected to field.

Match 37
14 January 2024
19:15 (N)
Scorecard

Sydney Thunder; 140 (19.2)	v	Adelaide Strikers; 1/141 (16.1 overs)
Alex Hales 43 (32); Lloyd Pope 4/22 (3 overs)		Matthew Short 74* (49); Tanveer Sangha 1/27 (4 overs)

Adelaide Strikers won by 9 wickets
Manuka Oval, Canberra
Umpires: Simon Lightbody and Paul Wilson
Player of the match: Lloyd Pope (Adelaide Strikers)

- Sydney Thunder won the toss and elected to bat.

== Play-offs ==
=== Matches ===
Knockout
20 January 2024
16:40 AWST (N)
Scorecard

Adelaide Strikers; 7/155 (20 overs)	v	Perth Scorchers; 105 (16.2 overs)
Jake Weatherald 56 (32); Cooper Connolly 2/17 (3 overs)		Sam Fanning 31 (20); Lloyd Pope 4/24 (4 overs)

Adelaide Strikers won by 50 runs
Optus Stadium, Perth
Attendance: –
Umpires: Gerard Abood and Shawn Craig
Player of the match: Lloyd Pope (Adelaide Strikers)

- Perth Scorchers won the toss and elected to field.

Challenger
22 January 2024
18:40 AEST (N)
Scorecard

Brisbane Heat; 7/214 (20 overs)	v	Adelaide Strikers; 160 (19.5 overs)
Josh Brown 140 (57); David Payne 2/17 (3 overs)		Harry Nielsen 50 (33); Spencer Johnson 3/20 (4 overs)

Brisbane Heat won by 54 runs
Heritage Bank Stadium, Carrara
Attendance: –
Umpires: Gerard Abood and Sam Nogajski
Player of the match: Josh Brown (Brisbane Heat)

- Brisbane Heat won the toss and elected to bat.

== Current squads ==
Teams	Squads
Adelaide Strikers	Travis Head, Wes Agar, James Bazley, Cameron Boyce, Alex Carey, Brendan Doggett, Henry Hunt, Thomas Kelly, Chris Lynn, Ben Manenti, Harry Nielsen, David Payne, D'Arcy Short, Matt Short, Jamie Overton, Adam Hose, Jake Weatherald, Lloyd Pope

The current squad of the Adelaide Strikers for the 2023–24 Big Bash League season as of 25 September 2023.

=== Squad information ===
- Players with international caps are listed in **bold**.

S/N	Name	Nationality	Date of birth (age)	Batting style	Bowling style	Notes
Batters
34	**Travis Head**	Australia	29 December 1993 (age 32)	Left-handed	Right-arm off break	
21	Adam Hose	England	25 October 1992 (age 33)	Right-handed	—N/a	Overseas Draft Pick (Bronze) & International
22	Henry Hunt	Australia	7 January 1997 (age 29)	Right-handed	—N/a	
31	Thomas Kelly	Australia	14 December 2000 (age 25)	Right-handed	—N/a	
50	**Chris Lynn**	Australia	10 April 1990 (age 36)	Right-handed	Slow left arm orthodox	International
28	**D'Arcy Short**	Australia	9 August 1990 (age 36)	Left-handed	Left-arm leg spin	International
2	**Matthew Short**	Australia	8 November 1995 (age 30)	Right-handed	Right-arm off break	Captain & International
28	Jake Weatherald	Australia	4 November 1994 (age 31)	Left-handed	—N/a	
All-rounders
26	**Ben Manenti**	Italy	23 March 1997 (age 29)	Right-handed	Right-arm off break	International
7	James Bazley	Australia	8 April 1995 (age 31)	Right-handed	Right-arm medium-fast	
88	**Jamie Overton**	England	10 April 1994 (age 32)	Right-handed	Right-arm fast	Overseas Draft Pick (Gold) & International
Wicket-keepers
5	**Alex Carey**	Australia	27 August 1991 (age 35)	Left-handed	—N/a	International
4	**Harry Nielsen**	Australia	3 May 1995 (age 31)	Left-handed	Right-arm off break	
Spin bowlers
87	**Cameron Boyce**	Australia	27 July 1989 (age 37)	Right-handed	Right-arm leg break	International
Pace bowlers
9	**Wes Agar**	Australia	5 February 1997 (age 29)	Right-handed	Right-arm fast	International
35	Brendan Doggett	Australia	3 May 1994 (age 32)	Right-handed	Right-arm medium-fast	
58	Henry Thornton	Australia	16 December 1996 (age 29)	Right-handed	Right-arm fast-medium	
