= 2016–17 Adelaide Strikers season =

Adelaide Strikers
2016–17 season
- Coach: Jason Gillespie (6th season)
- Captain(s): Brad Hodge (6th season)
- Home ground: Adelaide Oval, Adelaide
- Highest home attendance: 45,471 vs Sixers (31 December 2016)
- Lowest home attendance: 38,011 vs Brisbane Heat (21 December 2015)
- Average home attendance: 43,689

The 2016–17 Adelaide Strikers season is stated as follows:

== Ladder ==
Pos	Team	Pld	W	L	NR	Pts	NRR	Qualification
1	Perth Scorchers (C)	8	5	3	0	10	0.618	Advanced to semi-finals
2	Brisbane Heat	8	5	3	0	10	0.516	Advanced to semi-finals
3	Sydney Sixers	8	5	3	0	10	−0.848	Advanced to semi-finals
4	Melbourne Stars	8	4	4	0	8	0.397	Advanced to semi-finals
5	Melbourne Renegades	8	4	4	0	8	0.042	
6	Adelaide Strikers	8	3	5	0	6	0.334	
7	Hobart Hurricanes	8	3	5	0	6	−0.530	
8	Sydney Thunder	8	3	5	0	6	−0.600	

(C) Champions

=== Ladder progress ===
Round	1	2	3	4	5	6	7	8
Ground	H	A	H	A	H	A	H	A
Result	L	L	W	L	W	L	-	-
Position	4	6	6	6	5	6	-	-

Source: Competitive Matches
A = Away; H = Home; W = Win; D = Draw; L = Lose

=== Regular season ===
21 December
19:10 (D/N)
Scorecard

Brisbane Heat; 5/206 (20 overs)	v	Adelaide Strikers (H); 6/196 (20 overs)
Alex Ross 64 (36); Kieron Pollard 2/27 (4 overs)		Ben Dunk 85 (43); Mark Steketee 3/32 (4 overs)

Brisbane Heat won by 10 runs
Adelaide Oval
Attendance: 38,011
Umpires: Shawn Craig and Sam Nogajski
Player of the match: Brendon McCullum (Heat)

- Adelaide Strikers won the toss and elected to field.
- Liam O'Connor, Jake Weatherald (Strikers) and Jack Wildermuth (Heat) all made their T20 debuts.

23 December
18:15 (D/N)
Scorecard

(H) Perth Scorchers; 7/197 (20 overs)	v	Adelaide Strikers; 9/149 (20 overs)
Ian Bell 61 (42); Michael Neser 2/37 (4 overs)		Brad Hodge 56 (33); Mitchell Johnson 3/33 (4 overs)

Perth Scorchers won by 48 runs
#TheFurnace
Attendance: 20,430
Umpires: Greg Davidson and Mick Martell
Player of the match: Ashton Turner (Scorchers)

- Adelaide Strikers won the toss and elected to field.

31 December
18:40 (D/N)
Scorecard

(H) Adelaide Strikers; 9/152 (20 overs)	v	Sydney Sixers; 104 (18.2 overs)
Ben Dunk 37 (20); Sean Abbott 5/16 (4 overs)		Sam Billings 40 (30); Billy Stanlake 3/17 (3.2 overs)

Adelaide Strikers won by 48 runs
Adelaide Oval
Attendance: 45,471
Umpires: Ashley Barrow and Greg Davidson
Player of the match: Sean Abbott (Sixers)

- Sydney Sixers won the toss and elected to field.
- Tom Andrews (Strikers) made his T20 debut.

2 January
19:10 (D/N)
Scorecard

Adelaide Strikers; 143 (20 overs)	v	Hobart Hurricanes (H); 2/144 (17.4 overs)
Brad Hodge 55 (45); Daniel Christian 5/14 (4 overs)		D'Arcy Short 60 (39); Billy Stanlake 1/17 (4 overs)

Hobart Hurricanes won by 8 wickets
Blundstone Arena
Attendance: 16,815
Umpires: Phillip Gillespie and John Ward
Player of the match: Daniel Christian (Hurricanes)

- Hobart Hurricanes won the toss and elected to field.
- Beau Webster (Hurricanes) made his T20 debut.

6 January
18:40 (D/N)
Scorecard

Hobart Hurricanes; 8/161 (20 overs)	v	Adelaide Strikers (H); 5/164 (18.2 overs)
Beau Webster 67* (43); Chris Jordan 3/24 (4 overs)		Ben Dunk 79* (49); Daniel Christian 2/24 (4 overs)

Adelaide Strikers won by 5 wickets
Adelaide Oval
Attendance: 39,229
Umpires: Simon Fry and Michael Graham-Smith
Player of the match: Ben Dunk (Strikers)

- Adelaide Strikers won the toss and elected to field.

10 January
19:40 (D/N)
Scorecard

Adelaide Strikers; 8/152 (20 overs)	v	Melbourne Stars (H); 8/153 (19.3 overs)
Ben Dunk 35 (25); Scott Boland 4/30 (4 overs)		Ben Hilfenhaus 32* (24); Ben Laughlin 3/19 (4 overs)

Melbourne Stars won by 2 wickets
Melbourne Cricket Ground
Attendance: 40,254
Umpires: John Ward and Paul Wilson
Player of the match: Ben Hilfenhaus (Stars)

- Melbourne Stars won the toss and elected to field.
- Liam Bowe (Stars) and Wes Agar (Strikers) both made their T20 debuts.
- The crowd of 40,254 is the highest crowd for a non-derby BBL match at the MCG.

== Squad ==
- Ages are given as of the opening date of the tournament, 20 December 2016

S/N	Name	Nationality	Date of birth (age)	Batting style	Bowling style	Notes
Batsmen
17	Brad Hodge	Australia	29 December 1974 (aged 41)	Right-handed	Right arm off spin	Captain & International Cap
77	Jono Dean	Australia	23 June 1984 (aged 32)	Right-handed	Right arm off spin	
34	Travis Head	Australia	29 December 1993 (aged 22)	Left-handed	Right arm off spin	International Cap
19	Kelvin Smith	Australia	5 September 1994 (aged 22)	Left-handed	Right arm off spin	
33	Jake Lehmann	Australia	8 July 1992 (aged 24)	Left-handed	Left-arm orthodox	
28	Jake Weatherald	Australia	4 November 1994 (aged 22)	Left-handed	Right-arm off spin	
–	Patrick Page	Australia	15 January 1998 (aged 18)	Left-handed	Right arm medium	Development Rookie
All-rounders
55	Kieron Pollard	West Indies	12 May 1987 (aged 29)	Right-handed	Right arm medium fast	Overseas Player & International Cap
20	Michael Neser	Australia	29 March 1990 (aged 26)	Right-handed	Right arm medium fast	
8	Chris Jordan	England	4 September 1988 (aged 28)	Right-handed	Right arm fast medium	Overseas Player & International Cap
Wicketkeepers
15	Tim Ludeman	Australia	23 June 1987 (aged 29)	Right-handed	–	
51	Ben Dunk	Australia	11 March 1987 (aged 29)	Left-handed	–	International Cap
5	Alex Carey	Australia	27 August 1991 (aged 25)	Left-handed	–	
Pace bowlers
13	Kane Richardson	Australia	12 February 1991 (aged 25)	Right-handed	Right arm fast medium	International Cap
56	Ben Laughlin	Australia	3 October 1982 (aged 34)	Right-handed	Right arm fast medium	International Cap
3	Billy Stanlake	Australia	11 April 1994 (aged 22)	Right-handed	Right arm fast	International Cap
21	Wes Agar	Australia	5 February 1997 (aged 19)	Right-handed	Right arm fast medium	
Spin bowlers
9	Liam O'Connor	Australia	20 June 1993 (aged 23)	Right-handed	Right arm leg spin	
61	Ish Sodhi	New Zealand	31 October 1992 (aged 24)	Right-handed	Right arm leg spin	Visa Contract & Injury Replacement for Chris Jordan
-	Tom Andrews	Australia	7 August 1994 (aged 22)	Right-handed	Left arm orthodox	
