= 2015–16 Adelaide Strikers season =

Adelaide Strikers
2015–16 season
- Coach: Jason Gillespie (5th season)
- Captain(s): Brad Hodge (5th season)
- Home ground: Adelaide Oval, Adelaide
- BBL: 1st
- BBL Finals: Semi-finalist
- Leading Run Scorer: Travis Head(299)
- Leading Wicket Taker: Adil Rashid(9)
- Highest home attendance: 49,115 vs Hurricanes (13 January 2016)
- Lowest home attendance: 27,611 vs Stars (18 December 2015)
- Average home attendance: 43,689

== Ladder ==
| Pos | Team | Pld | W | L | NR | Pts | NRR | Qualification |
|---|---|---|---|---|---|---|---|---|
| 1 | Adelaide Strikers | 8 | 7 | 1 | 0 | 14 | 0.544 | Advanced to semi-finals |
| 2 | Melbourne Stars | 8 | 5 | 3 | 0 | 10 | 0.366 | Advanced to semi-finals |
| 3 | Perth Scorchers | 8 | 5 | 3 | 0 | 10 | 0.181 | Advanced to semi-finals |
| 4 | Sydney Thunder (C) | 8 | 4 | 4 | 0 | 8 | 0.375 | Advanced to semi-finals |
| 5 | Melbourne Renegades | 8 | 3 | 5 | 0 | 6 | −0.041 | |
| 6 | Brisbane Heat | 8 | 3 | 5 | 0 | 6 | −0.204 | |
| 7 | Hobart Hurricanes | 8 | 3 | 5 | 0 | 6 | −0.955 | |
| 8 | Sydney Sixers | 8 | 2 | 6 | 0 | 4 | −0.330 | |

(C) Champions

=== Ladder progress ===
| Round | 1 | 2 | 3 | 4 | 5 | 6 | 7 | 8 |
|---|---|---|---|---|---|---|---|---|
| Ground | H | A | A | H | H | A | H | A |
| Result | W | W | L | W | W | W | W | W |
| Position | 1 | 2 | 3 | 2 | 1 | 1 | 1 | 1 |

Source: Competitive Matches
A = Away; H = Home; W = Win; D = Draw; L = Lose

=== Regular season ===
18 December
19:10 (D/N)
Scorecard

| (H) Adelaide Strikers; 5/187 (20 overs) | v | Melbourne Stars; 7/168 (20 overs) |
| Alex Ross 65 (31); Scott Boland 2/55 (4 overs) | | Marcus Stoinis 50 (42); Kane Richardson 3/23 (4 overs) |

Adelaide Strikers won by 19 runs
Adelaide Oval
Attendance: 27,611
Umpires: Gerard Abood and Michael Graham-Smith
Player of the match: Alex Ross (Strikers)

- Melbourne Stars won the toss and elected to field.

21 December
16:10
Scorecard

| (H) Perth Scorchers; 6/151 (20 overs) | v | Adelaide Strikers; 6/152 (19.1 overs) |
| Shaun Marsh 47 (35); Ben Laughlin 2/20 (3 overs) | | Mahela Jayawardene 42 (40); David Willey 2/24 (4 overs) |

Adelaide Strikers won by 4 wickets
#TheFurnace
Attendance: 20,553
Umpires: Gerard Abood and Mick Martell
Player of the match: Adil Rashid (Strikers)

- Perth Scorchers won the toss and elected to bat.

28 December
19:10 (D/N)
Scorecard

| Adelaide Strikers; 9/117 (20 overs) | v | Sydney Thunder (H); 3/121 (16.3 overs) |
| Brad Hodge 34 (33); Clint McKay 2/18 (3 overs) | | Jacques Kallis 49* (48); Ben Laughlin 2/22 (2.3 overs) |

Sydney Thunder won by 7 wickets
Spotless Stadium
Attendance: 21,500
Umpires: Gerard Abood and Greg Davidson
Player of the match: Andre Russell (Thunder)

- Adelaide Strikers won the toss and elected to bat.
- The crowd of 21,500 is the highest attendance for a cricket match at Spotless Stadium and the second highest attendance for any sport at the stadium.
- Billy Stanlake (Strikers) made his T20 debut.

31 December
18:40 (D/N)
Scorecard

| Sydney Sixers; 5/176 (20 overs) | v | Adelaide Strikers (H); 5/182 (19.3 overs) |
| Brad Haddin 54* (35); Adil Rashid 3/34 (4 overs) | | Travis Head 101* (53); Ben Dwarshuis 3/25 (4 overs) |

Adelaide Strikers won by 5 wickets
Adelaide Oval
Attendance: 46,389
Umpires: Simon Fry and Paul Wilson
Player of the match: Travis Head (Strikers)

- Adelaide Strikers won the toss and elected to field.
- Hamish Kingston (Strikers) made his T20 debut.

5 January
19:10 (D/N)
Scorecard

| (H) Adelaide Strikers; 2/174 (20 overs) | v | Perth Scorchers; 138 (17.3 overs) |
| Mahela Jayawardene 57 (37); Ashton Agar 1/12 (2 overs) | | David Willey 31 (17); Adil Rashid 3/23 (4 overs) |

Adelaide Strikers won by 36 runs
Adelaide Oval
Attendance: 46,633
Umpires: Shawn Craig and Greg Davidson
Player of the match: Travis Head (Strikers)

- Adelaide Strikers won the toss and elected to bat.
- Jake Lehmann (Strikers) made his T20 debut.

8 January
18:40 (D/N)
Scorecard

| (H) Brisbane Heat; 6/175 (20 overs) | v | Adelaide Strikers; 2/179 (18.4 overs) |
| Jimmy Peirson 51 (36); Adil Rashid 2/17 (4 overs) | | Tim Ludeman 57* (49); Samuel Badree 1/25 (4 overs) |

Adelaide Strikers won by 8 wickets
The Gabba
Attendance: 33,783
Umpires: Ashley Barrow and Phillip Gillespie
Player of the match: Mahela Jayawardene (Strikers)

- Adelaide Strikers won the toss and elected to field.
- The crowd of 33,783 is the highest crowd at the Gabba for a BBL match.

13 January
19:10 (D/N)
Scorecard

| Hobart Hurricanes; 143 (19.3 overs) | v | Adelaide Strikers (H); 4/146 (20 overs) |
| Tim Paine 45 (39); Michael Neser 3/26 (3.3 overs) | | Tim Ludeman 57* (58); Simon Milenko 3/25 (4 overs) |

Adelaide Strikers won by 6 wickets
Adelaide Oval
Attendance: 49,115
Umpires: Shawn Craig and Paul Wilson
Player of the match: Adil Rashid (Strikers)

- Hobart Hurricanes won the toss and elected to bat.
- Greg West (Strikers) made his T20 debut.
- The crowd of 49,115 is the highest at Adelaide Oval for a non-finals BBL match.

18 January
19:40 (D/N)
Scorecard

| Adelaide Strikers; 5/170 (20 overs) | v | Melbourne Renegades (H); 143 (15.3 overs) |
| Tim Ludeman 49 (41); Xavier Doherty 2/30 (4 overs) | | Chris Gayle 56 (17); Travis Head 3/16 (2 overs) |

Adelaide Strikers won by 27 runs
Etihad Stadium
Attendance: 25,227
Umpires: Gerard Abood and Shawn Craig
Player of the match: Travis Head (Strikers)

- Melbourne Renegades won the toss and elected to field.
- Chris Gayle (Renegades) equaled the world record for the fastest fifty in a T20 match (12 balls).

== Finals ==
Semifinals
1 | Adelaide Strikers (H) | 7/159 (20 ov)
4 | Sydney Thunder | 2/160 (17.4 ov)
2 | Melbourne Stars (H)
3 | Perth Scorchers

Final
4 | Sydney Thunder
TBA

=== Semi-finals ===
The top four teams from the group stage qualified for the semi-finals.

21 January
19:10 (D/N)
Scorecard

| (H) Adelaide Strikers; 7/159 (20 overs) | v | Sydney Thunder; 2/160 (17.4 overs) |
| Alex Ross 47 (38); Clint McKay 3/44 (4 overs) | | Usman Khawaja 104* (59); Ben Laughlin 1//21 (3 overs) |

Sydney Thunder won by 8 wickets
Adelaide Oval
Attendance: 48,699
Umpires: Gerard Abood and Simon Fry
Player of the match: Usman Khawaja (Thunder)

- Adelaide Strikers won the toss and elected to bat.

== Squad ==
Players with international caps are listed in bold.

- Ages are given as of the first day of the tournament, 17 December 2015.

| S/N | Name | Nationality | Birth date | Batting style | Bowling style | Notes |
| | Batsmen | | | | | |
|---|---|---|---|---|---|---|
| 50 | Craig Simmons | Australia | 1 December 1982 (aged 33) | Left-handed | Left arm orthodox | |
| 17 | **Brad Hodge** | Australia | 29 December 1974 (aged 40) | Right-handed | Right arm off spin | Assistant coach and Captain |
| 77 | Jono Dean | Australia | 23 June 1984 (aged 31) | Right-handed | Right arm off spin | |
| 49 | Alex Ross | Australia | 17 April 1992 (aged 23) | Right-handed | Right arm off spin | |
| 19 | Kelvin Smith | Australia | 5 September 1994 (aged 21) | Left-handed | Right arm off spin | |
| | Patrick Page | Australia | 15 January 1998 (aged 17) | Left-handed | Right arm medium fast | Development Rookie |
| 33 | Jake Lehmann | Australia | 8 July 1992 (aged 23) | Left-handed | Left arm orthodox | |
| 27 | **Mahela Jayawardene** | Sri Lanka | 27 May 1977 (aged 38) | Right-handed | Right arm medium | Overseas player (injury replacement for Kieron Pollard) |
| | All-rounder | | | | | |
| 34 | Travis Head | Australia | 29 December 1993 (aged 21) | Left-handed | Right arm off spin | |
| 55 | **Kieron Pollard** | West Indies | 12 May 1987 (aged 28) | Right-handed | Right arm medium fast | Overseas player |
| 20 | Michael Neser | Australia | 29 March 1990 (aged 25) | Right-handed | Right arm medium fast | |
| 29 | Hamish Kingston | Australia | 17 December 1990 (aged 25) | Right-handed | Right arm medium fast | |
| 42 | Alexander Keath | Australia | 20 January 1992 (aged 23) | Right-handed | Right arm medium | |
| | Wicket-keeperw | | | | | |
| 15 | Tim Ludeman | Australia | 23 June 1987 (aged 28) | Right-handed | — | Opener |
| | Fast bowlers | | | | | |
| 23 | **Kane Richardson** | Australia | 12 February 1991 (aged 24) | Right-handed | Right arm fast medium | |
| 56 | **Ben Laughlin** | Australia | 3 October 1982 (aged 33) | Right-handed | Right arm fast medium | |
| 10 | Gary Putland | Australia | 10 February 1986 (aged 29) | Right-handed | Left arm fast medium | |
| 3 | Billy Stanlake | Australia | 11 April 1994 (aged 21) | Right-handed | Right arm fast medium | |
| | Spin bowlers | | | | | |
| 25 | Jon Holland | Australia | 29 May 1987 (aged 28) | Right-handed | Left arm off spin | |

== Home attendance ==
| Game | Opponent | Attendance |
|---|---|---|
| 2 | Melbourne Stars | 27,611 |
| 14 | Sydney Sixers | 46,389 |
| 20 | Perth Scorchers | 46,633 |
| 28 | Hobart Hurricanes | 49,115 |
| SF1 | Sydney Thunder | 48,699 |
| Total Attendance | | 218,447 |
| Average Attendance | | 43,689 |

== TV audience ==
Following are the television ratings for 2015–16 BBL season involving Team Adelaide Strikers in Australia.

| Match No | Teams | Average TV Ratings | | | |
| Match No | Teams | National | | 5 metro cities | |
| Match No | Teams | Session 1 | Session 2 | Session 1 | Session 2 |
|---|---|---|---|---|---|
| 2 | Adelaide Strikers vs Melbourne Stars | 999,000 | 1,270,000 | 720,000 | 941,000 |
| 6 | Perth Scorchers vs Adelaide Strikers | 898,000 | 1,200,000 | 664,000 | 919,000 |
| 11 | Sydney Thunder vs Adelaide Strikers | 797,000 | 1,030,000 | 575,000 | 758,000 |
| 14 | Adelaide Strikers vs Sydney Sixers | 729,000 | 887,000 | 517,000 | 629,000 |
| 20 | Adelaide Strikers vs Perth Scorchers | 1,210,000 | 1,270,000 | 878,000 | 983,000 |
| 23 | Brisbane Heat vs Adelaide Strikers | 1,180,000 | 1,040,000 | 765,000 | 887,000 |
| 28 | Adelaide Strikers vs Hobart Hurricanes | 1,040,000 | 1,190,000 | 788,000 | 897,000 |
| 32 | Melbourne Renegades vs Adelaide Strikers | 1,110,000 | 1,360,000 | 820,000 | 1,020,000 |
| SF1 | Adelaide Strikers vs Sydney Thunder | 1,070,000 | 1,220,000 | 806,000 | 929,000 |
| Total | | 9,033,000 | 10,467,000 | 6,533,000 | 7,963,000 |
| Average | | 1,163,000 | | 884,777 | |
