= Darren Berry =

Australian cricketer and coach (born 1969)

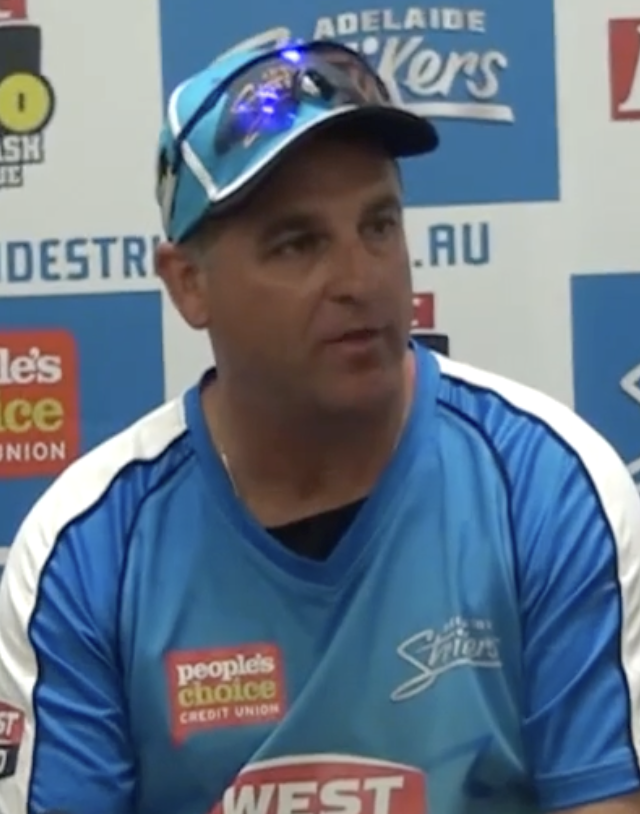

Personal information
- Full name: Darren Shane Berry
- Born: 10 December 1969 (age 56); Melbourne, Victoria, Australia
- Nickname: Chuck
- Batting: Right-handed
- Role: Wicketkeeper

Domestic team information
- Years: Team
- 1989/90: South Australia
- 1990/91–2003/04: Victoria
- 2000: Marylebone Cricket Club
- First-class debut: 3 November 1989 South Australia v Queensland
- Last First-class: 12 March 2004 Victoria v Queensland
- List A debut: 21 October 1989 South Australia v Queensland
- Last List A: 21 February 2004 Victoria v Western Australia

Career statistics
Competition	First-class	List A
Matches	153	89
Runs scored	4273	825
Batting average	21.58	17.93
100s/50s	4/11	0/2
Top score	166*	64*
Balls bowled	12	0
Wickets	0	–
Bowling average	–	–
5 wickets in innings	–	–
10 wickets in match	–	–
Best bowling	–	–
Catches/stumpings	552/51	108/29
- Source: CricketArchive, 7 November 2011

Darren Shane Berry (born 10 December 1969) is an Australian cricket coach and former cricketer who was known for his sharp skills as a wicketkeeper, first with South Australia and then Victoria in the Sheffield Shield and ING Cup domestic competitions. He led the Redbacks to the first premiership win in 2010 of the BBL.

Berry was the head coach of the South Australia cricket team for 5 years (including the Adelaide Strikers in the BBL Tournament).

Between 2017 and 2019, Berry served as assistant coach to the late Dean Jones for Islamabad United in the Pakistan Super League.

== Cricket career ==
Making his first-class debut for South Australia in the 1989–90 season, Berry moved back to his native Victoria to play with the Bushrangers in the 1990–91 season, and enjoyed a large degree of success. One of the high points of his career came in the 1997 Ashes tour, when he was selected to replace the injured Adam Gilchrist as the team's second-string wicketkeeper. Unfortunately, Berry did not represent Australia in a Test match on that tour.

In 2003–04, Berry ended his career on a high, captaining Victoria to a Pura Cup title against Queensland, although he was suspended for a short time during the season when he was late to a training session after accidentally setting his alarm to the wrong time.

In terms of pure keeping ability, Berry was rated extremely highly, particularly his ability "keeping up" both to leg-spinner Shane Warne and to medium (and even fast-medium) paced bowlers. Warne, his Victorian teammate, said that "Darren Berry up to the stumps has probably been the best keeper that I've ever seen in my time ... I really wish he did get the opportunity to show how good a keeper he was, with a baggy green cap playing for Australia." Berry has often talked about his leg-side stumping off the bowling of paceman Paul Reiffel as one of his best achievements.

The reasons why Berry did not play for Australia included not only Australia's entrenched and effective keeper, Ian Healy, but his below par batting ability. Berry averaged only 21.58 in first-class cricket, with four centuries and 11 fifties in a long career, compared with Healy's 27 at Test level and 30 at first-class level, and well below the batting numbers of Healy's replacement, Adam Gilchrist

== Post-cricket career ==
In 2002, preparing for his retirement from cricket, Berry was the runner for the St Kilda Football Club, for which he played at Under 19 level, a team which he passionately supports. That year he also took up boundary riding for Triple M before he graduated to the role of match-day play-by-play commentator on matches following his retirement from cricket in 2004. Berry was later released by Triple M and picked up his commentary career with K-Rock in Geelong.

In addition to his role with K-Rock football, Berry writes a column in The Sunday Age and coaches the Carlton Cricket Club in the Victorian Premier League. Berry was then assistant coach for his beloved Victorian Bushrangers, followed by a stint in the IPL coaching alongside close mate Shane Warne where they delivered success in the inaugural season at Rajasthan Royals in 2008. He held the position as the head coach of the [Southern Redbacks], South Australia's state cricket team, as well as coaching the Adelaide Strikers in the T20 Big Bash League.

At the start of the 2016–17 season, Berry began work at Private Melbourne school, Xavier College, to coach the 1st XI cricket team. Berry was the head cricket coach at Xavier for three seasons accompanied by Assistant Coach and former First Class cricketer, Gerard Dowling.

Berry also served as assistant coach to the late Dean Jones with Islamabad United in the Pakistan Super League (2017-2019).

The team won two out of three titles in which Berry was involved in strategy analysis.

In recent times Berry was appointed Director of Cricket at the Rowville Secondary College – Cricket Academy in Melbourne's eastern suburbs

== Other ==
Darren Berry's nickname is "Chuck" after the American rock and roll singer.

== See also ==
- List of Victoria first-class cricketers
- List of South Australian representative cricketers
