= Ben Laughlin (cricketer) =

Australian cricketer

Personal information
- Full name: Ben Laughlin
- Born: 3 October 1982 (age 44); Box Hill, Victoria, Australia
- Batting: Right-handed
- Bowling: Right-arm fast-medium
- Role: Bowler

International information
- National side: Australia (2009–2013)
- ODI debut (cap 173): 3 April 2009 v South Africa
- Last ODI: 3 May 2009 v Pakistan
- T20I debut (cap 37): 29 March 2009 v South Africa
- Last T20I: 28 January 2013 v Sri Lanka

Domestic team information
- Years: Team
- 2007/08–2010/11: Queensland
- 2011/12–2013/14: Tasmania
- 2011/12–2014/15: Hobart Hurricanes
- 2012: Nagenahira Nagas
- 2012/13: Canterbury
- 2013: Chennai Super Kings
- 2013/14–2017/18: Northern Districts
- 2014: Antigua Hawksbills
- 2014/15–2018/19: Adelaide Strikers
- 2018: Quetta Gladiators
- 2018: Rajasthan Royals
- 2018: Balkh Legends
- 2019: Guyana Amazon Warriors
- 2019/20–2020/21: Brisbane Heat

Career statistics
Competition	ODI	T20I	LA	T20
Matches	5	3	39	164
Runs scored	1	–	157	172
Batting average	–	–	13.08	6.37
100s/50s	0/0	–	0/0	0/0
Top score	1*	–	34*	22
Balls bowled	224	71	2,048	3,390
Wickets	4	2	69	191
Bowling average	54.75	59.00	25.86	23.96
5 wickets in innings	0	0	2	1
10 wickets in match	0	0	0	0
Best bowling	1/28	1/32	6/23	6/28
Catches/stumpings	2/–	1/–	9/–	59/–
- Source: ESPNcricinfo, 4 October 2021

Ben Laughlin (born 3 October 1982) is a former Australian cricketer. A right-arm fast-medium bowler, he was primarily a Twenty20 specialist, featuring for a number of teams in the top global leagues. He also represented Australia in white-ball cricket eight times. Laughlin last featured in professional cricket for the Brisbane Heat of the BBL in 2021.

Laughlin began his career playing grade cricket in Queensland, and following his first-class debut for the side in 2008 he was selected to play for Australia in One Day Internationals and Twenty20 Internationals, though his time in the national side only lasted 8 matches across 4 years. He emerged as a star of Twenty20 cricket, playing for the Hobart Hurricanes in the Big Bash League (BBL) for three years before moving to Adelaide. He last featured in the BBL in 2021 for the Heat, and as of 2024 is the competition’s 9th highest wicket taker of all time. He also played for the Northern Districts Knights in New Zealand and has played in the Indian Premier League.

== Cricket career ==
=== Before first-class debut ===
Laughlin's father, Trevor Laughlin, played Test cricket for Australia in 1978. Though his father had played District Cricket in Victoria, Laughlin played his grade cricket for Wynnum Manly District Cricket Club in Queensland. For three seasons in a row, starting from when he was 19 years old, Laughlin had stress fractures which ruined his opportunities to play cricket. He made his way back into the team by bowling off-spin rather than pace, though he played as a specialist batsman at the time. His form as a pace bowler improved towards the end of the 2000s, and in 2006 he was awarded the Peter Burge Medal for the best grade cricketer in Queensland over the 2005–06 season, and in the three seasons leading up to his first-class debut in 2008 he took a total of 126 wickets, including 50 wickets in the 2006–07 season alone.

=== Queensland (2008–2011) ===
Laughlin made his first-class debut for Queensland's state team at the end of the 2007–08 Pura Cup season against Victoria and took the wicket of Victorian captain Cameron White. He was then given his first contract with Queensland for the 2008–09 season and started to play List A cricket for them in the 2008–09 Ford Ranger One Day Cup season. Despite it being his first season, he was very impressive and played in all eleven games, taking 23 wickets. He recorded a particularly exceptional bowling performance in a match against New South Wales in October 2008. In only his second List A match, he claimed 6/23, the best List A bowling figures for Queensland in two decades and the third-best of all time, not only for Queensland but for any Australian domestic team. He also played in three matches in the 2008–09 Sheffield Shield season, but he was far less successful in the longer form of the game.

Despite having started the season only hopeful of playing a few matches for Queensland, by March Laughlin was called up to the Australia squads for a series of five One Day Internationals and two Twenty20 Internationals against South Africa. Laughlin and fellow fast bowler Brett Geeves were drafted into the squad to replace Peter Siddle and Ben Hilfenhaus, who were being rested as a precaution before the 2009 ICC World Twenty20 and The Ashes. He did alright in the matches, finishing with four wickets in the ODIs, but he didn't star in any of them. After this brief stint in the national team he was not included in Australia's squad for the 2009 ICC World Twenty20 and he wasn't given a Cricket Australia contract. His career went downhill quickly, as he suffered from a painful stomach injury and was only able to play six state games in the 2009–10 summer, then in 2011 he was cut from Queensland's contract list altogether.

=== Tasmania and the Hobart Hurricanes (2011–2014) ===
When Laughlin was cut from Queensland's contract list he changed state teams to Tasmania, joining them for the 2011–12 Ryobi One-Day Cup. Echoing the start to his career for Queensland, Laughlin took his second six-wicket haul in his second match for Tasmania, also against New South Wales. He also played for Tasmania's team in the new Big Bash League (BBL), the Hobart Hurricanes. Despite being cut from Tasmania's contract list at the end of the season, his form for the Hurricanes was good enough that he was named in Australia's extended 30-man squad for the 2012 ICC World Twenty20.

Though Laughlin was unable to play much cricket for Tasmania, his performances for the Hurricanes were stellar in BBL|02. He took 14 wickets for the tournament, the most of any player, and was brought back into the national team for a two-match Twenty20 series against Sri Lanka. He didn't make the most of his opportunity and his performances were sub-par, as he fell short of the international standard and conceded 20 runs off of the final over of one of the matches.

Despite his failures in international cricket, Laughlin continued to perform strongly in domestic Twenty20 competitions in the 2013–14 season. He started to play for New Zealand team the Northern Districts Knights and was a crucial part of the side as they won the HRV Cup. including his third six-wicket haul and his first in a Twenty20 against Wellington cricket team. His figures of 6/28 equaled the record for the best bowling figures in a Twenty20 in New Zealand. He was again the leading wicket taker for the Hurricanes, but this time only the second best in the tournament for BBL|03 with 18 wickets at an incredible strike rate of a wicket every 12.8 balls. After three seasons with the Hurricanes he had taken 35 wickets.

=== Adelaide Strikers (2014–2019) ===
In 2014 Laughlin changed BBL teams, signing a two-year contract with the Adelaide Strikers and continued his stellar form, taking another 13 wickets in his first season at his new club. The next year in BBL|05 he became the first player in the Big Bash League to reach 50 career wickets in the tournament when he took two wickets in a match against the Melbourne Stars. He continued his strong form in BBL|06 with 9 wickets, still exceptional in the competition, at an average of 14.9 and remained the all-time leading wicket taker in the BBL.

Laughlin was also part of a controversial moment in BBL|06 during a match against the Sydney Thunder. Network Ten commentator Mark Howard gave advice to the Strikers' captain Brad Hodge on air, informing him that Laughlin had dismissed Thunder captain Shane Watson twice in his last eight balls to the batsman. Hodge then brought Laughlin on to bowl the next over. Cricket Australia investigated as the act was potentially an integrity breach. In February 2017, he was bought by the Sunrisers Hyderabad team for the 2017 Indian Premier League for 30 lakhs.

During BBL|07 Laughlin was part of what was called by Damien Fleming "the greatest outfield catch ever taken", though he was not credited for the catch on the scorecard. Melbourne Renegades batsman Dwayne Bravo hit the ball off of the bowling of Rashid Khan towards the boundary through the air. The ball was heading over the rope for six runs, but Laughlin was sprinting underneath it and caught it within the boundary rope. Laughlin was unable to keep his balance and had the throw the ball backwards to keep it in the boundary, and he threw it 30 metres backwards before running over the rope. The ball was thrown far enough and high enough that teammate Jake Weatherald was able to dive and catch it. As Weatherald was the fielder to finally catch the ball, he was credited with the catch. The Strikers, with Laughlin in the team went on to win the tournament, their first BBL title.

=== Brisbane Heat (2019–2022) ===
After being delisted in Adelaide after BBL08 Ben rejoined former Queensland teammates for the first few years of the Covid era BBL bubble.

=== T20 franchise career ===
In September 2018, he was named in Balkh's squad in the first edition of the Afghanistan Premier League tournament.

== Player profile ==
Laughlin is an exceptional pace bowler, the all-time leading wicket taker in the Big Bash League. His bowling mainly relies on bowling outswingers and changing his pace, sometimes bowling faster deliveries and sometimes bowling slower deliveries. He developed his off-cutter slower ball variation because of his time spent bowling off-spin early in his career. He is known as a "death bowler", as many of his wickets are taken in the final overs of a Twenty20 match, known as the "death" of the innings.

Laughlin is one of few Australian international cricketers in the 21st century who also kept a "normal" occupation during his cricket career, as he continued to work as a carpenter throughout his career, giving up days of work whenever he had to play cricket.
