= Liam Scott =

Australian cricketer (born 2000)

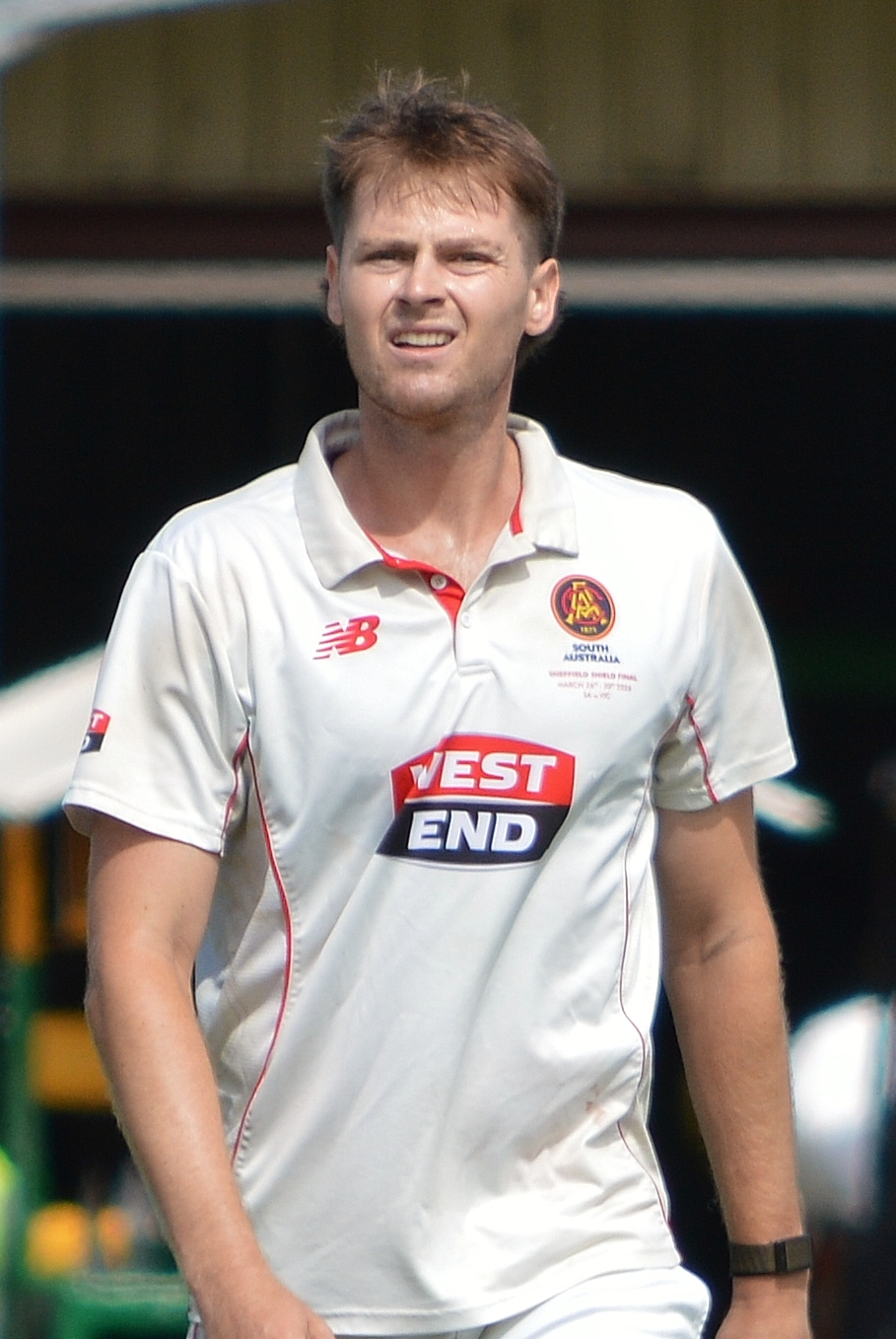
- Scott playing First Class cricket with South Australia in March 2026

Personal information
- Full name: Liam Alexander Hamilton Scott
- Born: 12 December 2000 (age 25); Crows Nest, New South Wales, Australia
- Batting: Right-handed
- Bowling: Right-arm fast-medium
- Role: Bowling all-rounder

International information
- National side: Australia (2026–present)
- Only ODI (cap 253): 9 June 2026 v Bangladesh

Domestic team information
- Years: Team
- 2019/20–present: South Australia (squad no. 6)
- 2020/21–Present: Adelaide Strikers (squad no. 6)
- 2026: Gloucestershire

Career statistics
Competition	ODI	FC	LA	T20
Matches	1	42	24	25
Runs scored	2	1,760	516	503
Batting average	2.00	27.50	36.85	29.58
100s/50s	0/0	1/9	0/3	0/3
Top score	2	147	73	91*
Balls bowled	48	5,555	786	253
Wickets	2	90	18	13
Bowling average	28.50	26.54	31.38	31.69
5 wickets in innings	0	3	0	0
10 wickets in match	0	0	0	0
Best bowling	2/57	5/33	3/16	2/12
Catches/stumpings	1/–	20/–	7/–	4/–
- Source: ESPNcricinfo, 23 October 2026

Liam Alexander Hamilton Scott (born 12 December 2000) is an Australian cricketer who has represented his country at One Day International (ODI) level, and plays domestic cricket for South Australia. A bowling all-rounder, he is a right-handed batter and right-arm fast-medium bowler.

== Career ==
Scott made his first-class debut on 29 November 2019, for South Australia against Western Australia in the 2019–20 Sheffield Shield season. In December, he was named in Australia's squad for the 2020 Under-19 Cricket World Cup. He made his Twenty20 debut on 20 December 2020, for the Adelaide Strikers, in the 2020–21 Big Bash League season. He made his List A debut on 15 February 2022, for South Australia against Victoria in the 2021–22 Marsh One-Day Cup. He took his maiden first-class five-wicket haul against Queensland during the 2021–22 Sheffield Shield season, with figures of 5/46.

In December 2025, Scott signed a contract to play for Gloucestershire County Cricket Club in the 2026 T20 Blast as well as two matches in that season's County Championship.
