= Harry Conway =

Australian cricketer

Personal information
- Full name: Harry Nicholas Alexander Conway
- Born: 17 September 1992 (age 34); Sydney, New South Wales, Australia
- Height: 200 cm (6 ft 7 in)
- Batting: Right-handed
- Bowling: Right-arm fast-medium
- Role: Bowler

Domestic team information
- Years: Team
- 2015/16–2021/22: New South Wales (squad no. 5)
- 2019/20–2022/23: Adelaide Strikers (squad no. 13)
- 2022/23–2024/25: South Australia (squad no. 13)
- 2025–2026: Northamptonshire

Career statistics
Competition	FC	LA	T20
Matches	61	22	24
Runs scored	389	83	16
Batting average	9.26	83.00	5.33
100s/50s	0/0	0/0	0/0
Top score	31	43*	6
Balls bowled	10,720	1,033	499
Wickets	183	28	20
Bowling average	26.79	34.35	36.05
5 wickets in innings	8	0	0
10 wickets in match	1	0	0
Best bowling	6/39	3/27	3/36
Catches/stumpings	21/–	7/–	1/–
- Source: ESPNcricinfo, 27 September 2026

Harry Nicholas Alexander Conway (born 17 September 1992) is an Australian cricketer who plays for South Australia. He is a right-arm fast-medium bowler and a right-handed batter.

== Career ==
Conway represented Australia in April 2012 as part of an under-19 quadrangular series against India, New Zealand and England and another series against Pakistan. Conway was named as part of the Australian squad for the 2012 Under-19 Cricket World Cup in July 2012. Later that month, he received a rookie contract with New South Wales ahead of the 2012/13 domestic season. He played a single match during the group stage, taking a hat-trick against Nepal, bowling Pradeep Airee, Naresh Budhayer and Prithu Baskota across two overs.

He made his first-class debut for New South Wales on 5 March 2016 against Tasmania in the 2015–16 Sheffield Shield. He took a five-wicket haul in the first innings with figures of 5/45. He made his List A debut in the final of the 2016–17 Matador BBQs One-Day Cup against Queensland on 23 October 2016.

He made his Twenty20 debut on 15 February 2017 against Sri Lanka for the Prime Minister's XI after being named as a replacement for James Pattinson. He was named as part of the Adelaide Strikers squad ahead of the 2019–20 Big Bash League season. In October 2019, he took his maiden ten-wicket haul against Queensland, taking 5/17 in the first innings and 5/39 in the second.

He was selected to play for Australia A as part of the Indian tour of Australia. During the second tour match he suffered a concussion and was replaced by Mark Steketee as concussion substitute.

Ahead of the 2022/23 cricket season in Australia, Conway was signed by South Australia. Conway was delisted by South Australia at the end of the 2024-25 season.

In March 2025, he signed for Northamptonshire County Cricket Club for four County Championship games.
