= Jake Lehmann =

Australian cricketer (born 1992)

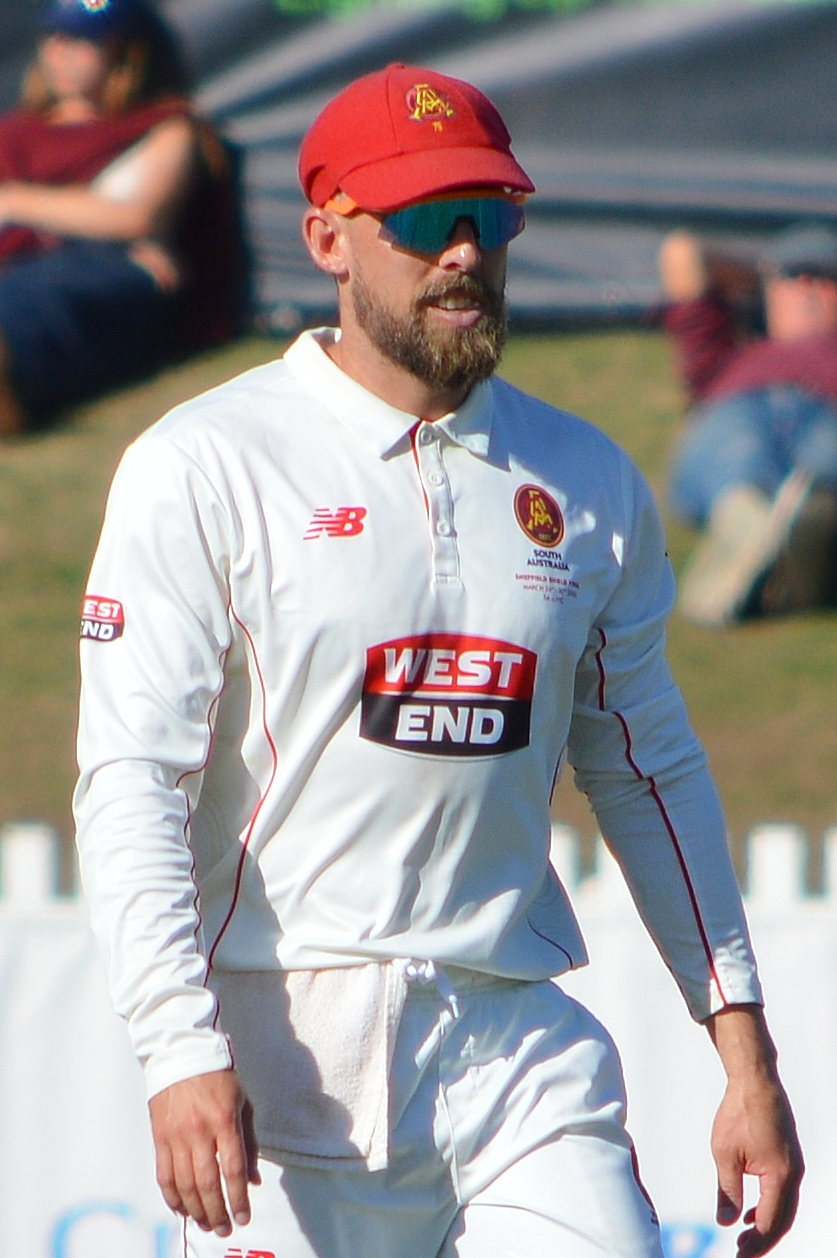
- Lehmann playing First Class cricket for South Australia in March 2026

Personal information
- Full name: Jake Scott Lehmann
- Born: 8 July 1992 (age 34); Melbourne, Victoria, Australia
- Batting: Left-handed
- Bowling: Slow left-arm orthodox
- Role: Batter
- Relatives: Darren Lehmann (father); Craig White (uncle)

Domestic team information
- Years: Team
- 2014/15–present: South Australia (squad no. 33)
- 2015/16–2018/19: Adelaide Strikers (squad no. 33)
- 2016: Yorkshire
- 2021/22: Brisbane Heat (squad no. 13)
- 2026–: Hampshire

Career statistics
Competition	FC	LA	T20
Matches	116	75	34
Runs scored	6,955	2,165	341
Batting average	36.03	35.49	14.20
100s/50s	18/37	0/16	0/1
Top score	205	87	65
Balls bowled	308	12	24
Wickets	4	0	1
Bowling average	48.25	–	42.00
5 wickets in innings	0	–	0
10 wickets in match	0	–	0
Best bowling	2/17	–	1/5
Catches/stumpings	74/–	26/–	15/–
- Source: ESPNcricinfo, 23 October 2026

Jake Scott Lehmann (born 8 July 1992) is an English-Australian cricketer who plays for South Australia. He is the eldest son of former Australian coach Darren Lehmann. Well known for his moustache, Lehmann began his first-class career in the 2014–15 season and enjoyed early success, scoring a double century in his second season. He began playing for the Adelaide Strikers in the Big Bash League in 2015 and hit a match-winning six against the Hobart Hurricanes in the first ball of his career and the last ball of the innings.

== Domestic career ==
Lehmann first represented South Australia in the Futures League. He made his name in the 2013–14 season of the tournament with 255 runs at an average of 36.42 across four matches, which earned him a rookie contract with South Australia for the following season. In the lead up to the 2014–15 season he played for the Western Grit in the West End Premier League, where he continued to impress with a fast-paced century against Eastern Edge. His form merited inclusion in South Australia's squad for the 2014–15 Matador BBQs One-Day Cup, in which he scored 54 runs in three innings. Lehmann led his grade cricket team East Torrens Cricket Club to victory in the one-day competition with an unbeaten 78 runs, again earning the attention of South Australia's selectors, who added him to the club's Sheffield Shield squad for the first time. He made his first-class debut in South Australia's penultimate match of the season against Victoria at Glenelg Oval on 5 March 2015, with his father, former South Australian captain Darren Lehmann, giving him his cap. He scored a half-century and played again in the final match of the season, scoring another half-century against Queensland.

Lehmann was upgraded to South Australia's senior squad for the 2015–16 season, which turned out to be a successful season for him. He began the season with a half-century against Victoria in the 2015–16 Matador BBQs One-Day Cup and scores of 74 and 86 in a Futures League match. He followed this up in his third first-class match, a Sheffield Shield match against Tasmania in which he scored his maiden first-class century, which was also his maiden first-class double century. He was part of a 378-run partnership with Callum Ferguson and finished with 205 runs from 242 balls. He was signed by the Adelaide Strikers ahead of Australia's domestic Twenty20 competition, BBL|05. On 5 January 2016 he made his debut for the Strikers, though he did not have to bat, and in his second match he came in for the last ball against the Hobart Hurricanes, the first ball of his Twenty20 career. The Strikers required four runs to win, and Lehmann hit a six to win the game. After the Big Bash League, he scored another two first-class centuries in the Sheffield Shield and finished the season with a first-class average above 50.

During the 2016 winter, Lehmann was in Australia A's squad against South Africa A in northern Australia. At the end of the winter, he replaced his South Australian teammate Travis Head at Yorkshire County Cricket Club, the same club that his father had played at for a decade with great success. He scored one century at the club, in his final match, with 116 against Somerset. Overall he managed 384 runs at an average of 54.85 while playing for Yorkshire. He had to return to South Australia to prepare for the 2016–17 season in September and missed the final match of the season.

Lehmann's 2016–17 Sheffield Shield season was highly successful, as he was an important part of three wins for South Australia and played in his second consecutive Sheffield Shield final. His best performances were an unbeaten century against Tasmania, which the Redbacks won by an innings, a hard-fought 47 not out to secure a tight two-wicket win against New South Wales and his participation in a 187-run partnership with Tom Cooper against Queensland. Lehmann is yet to represent the Australian national cricket team, and his father, Darren Lehmann, is the team's former coach. Lehmann resigned as the coach of the Australian cricket team following the ball-tampering scandal in South Africa in 2018. As a result, Darren Lehmann was part of Australia's selection panel. Darren Lehmann has abstained from any discussion on selecting Jake Lehmann for the national team.

During the 2017–18 Sheffield Shield season, Lehmann came into contention for national selection for the first time. Australia's number 6 batting spot for the 2017–18 Ashes series was still to be determined, and Lehmann became one of a number of possible options when he scored a first-innings century and a second-innings 93 against Victoria. He was not included in the squad, with veteran Shaun Marsh being named instead.

== Moustache ==
Early in his career, Lehmann started growing a moustache for a competition with Travis Head. Growing the moustache coincided with his rise from B-grade cricket to first-class grade, so he decided to keep it out of superstition. He described the moustache as his "little lucky charm", and it helped him to become a cult figure in South Australian cricket, with a number of Twitter accounts being created in honour of it.
