= Harry Nielsen (cricketer) =

Australian cricketer (born 1995)

Personal information
- Full name: Harry James Nielsen
- Born: 3 May 1995 (age 31); Ashford, Adelaide, South Australia
- Batting: Left-handed
- Role: Wicket-keeper
- Relatives: Tim Nielsen (father)

Domestic team information
- Years: Team
- 2017/18–present: South Australia (squad no. 4)
- 2017/18–present: Adelaide Strikers (squad no. 4)

Career statistics
| Competition | FC | LA | T20 |
|---|---|---|---|
| Matches | 57 | 35 | 52 |
| Runs scored | 2,676 | 724 | 466 |
| Batting average | 28.16 | 27.84 | 18.64 |
| 100s/50s | 2/14 | 1/4 | 0/1 |
| Top score | 114 | 110 | 50 |
| Catches/stumpings | 167/5 | 37/2 | 32/3 |
- Source: Cricinfo, 23 October 2026

Harry James Nielsen (born 3 May 1995) is an Australian cricketer, the son of former South Australian cricketer Tim Nielsen. During the 2017–18 season, he made his debut in all three major forms of the game, first-class, one-day and Twenty20 cricket playing for Cricket Australia XI in the JLT One-Day Cup and tour matches, the Adelaide Strikers in the Big Bash League and South Australia in the Sheffield Shield.

== Domestic career ==
=== Early career ===
Nielsen started his career playing grade cricket for Woodville Cricket Club in Adelaide. He played his first against a higher quality opposition when he played for a Cricket Australia XI against the touring India national cricket team. Despite his team's poor performance, he scored 43 runs off 40 balls and was part of a 52-run partnership for the final wicket. His next major appearance was in another tour match, this time when South Africa were touring Australia, but instead of playing against the South Africans he played with them. When South Africa's wicket-keeper Quinton de Kock was unable to field and their reserve keeper had not yet arrived in the country, Nielsen had to leave partway through a grade cricket match for Woodville to stand in as their wicket-keeper. This gave him the opportunity to keep to a world-class bowling attack.

Nielsen started to play for South Australia in the Futures League. When he was the state's leading run-scorer in the competition for the 2016–17 season, he was upgraded to a senior contract with South Australia for the 2017–18 season.

=== 2017–18 season ===
Nielsen was in the Cricket Australia XI squad for the 2017–18 JLT One-Day Cup and played for them in all six matches, one of their standout players in the tournament. He made his List A debut for Cricket Australia XI in the first match of the tournament against South Australia. He took three catches as Cricket Australia XI's wicket-keeper in what was just the team's second win in their history. He made his first mark with the bat against Victoria, when he came to the crease with Cricket Australia XI at 4/36. They lost two more wickets quickly to fall to 6/45, but Nielsen fought hard and scored 94 runs, falling just short of a century, taking them to 9/216. They lost the match by 7 wickets. He finished the tournament with the highest batting average among the team, scoring 147 runs at an average of 49.00. As their keeper he also had nine dismissals. In November 2017 he also made his first-class debut for Cricket Australia XI in a tour match against England.

During the 2017–18 Big Bash League season, Nielsen was added to the Adelaide Strikers squad for their semi-final match in order to replace their regular wicket-keeper Alex Carey, who was busy playing for Australia's national team at the time. He was taken out of the team for the BBL final when Carey was surprisingly released from his national duty.

Nielsen made his Sheffield Shield debut for South Australia a week later when Carey was again called up for national duties. His father Tim Nielsen, who had also kept wickets for South Australia, presented him with his cap. He scored a century in the first innings of the match, becoming the ninth South Australian to do so on Sheffield Shield debut, with his 105 bringing South Australia back into the game after they had slipped to 5/126. On 2 December 2018, he scored a century against India in a tour match for Cricket Australia XI.
