= Adam Hose =

English cricketer (born 1992)

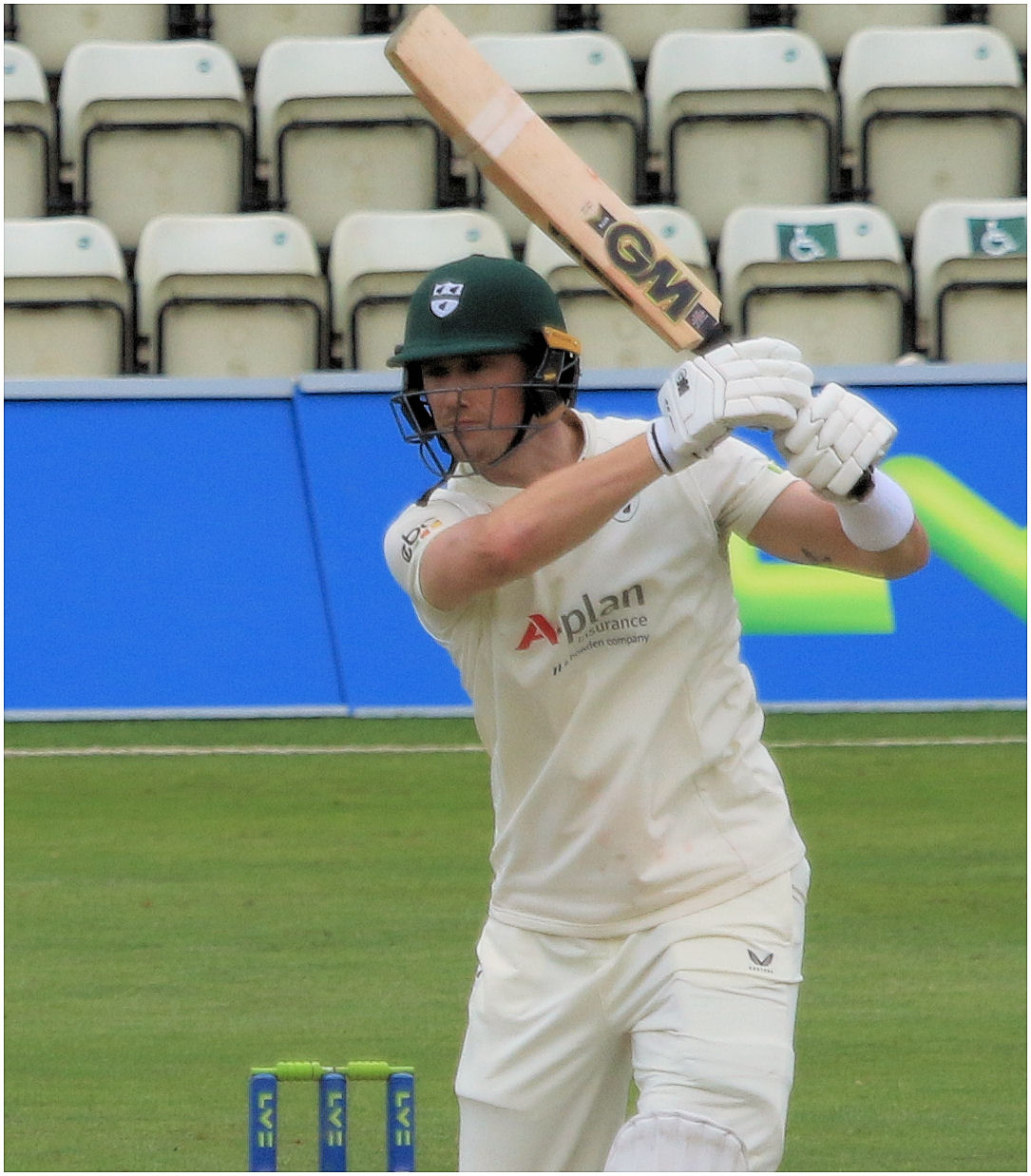
- Hose in 2023

Personal information
- Full name: Adam John Hose
- Born: 25 October 1992 (age 34); Newport, Isle of Wight, England
- Height: 6 ft 4 in (1.93 m)
- Batting: Right-handed
- Bowling: Right-arm medium-fast
- Role: Middle-order batter

Domestic team information
- Years: Team
- 2015–2017: Somerset (squad no. 21)
- 2017–2022: Warwickshire (squad no. 21)
- 2018/19: Wellington
- 2022–2024: Northern Superchargers
- 2022: St Lucia Kings
- 2022/23–2023/24: Adelaide Strikers
- 2023–2026: Worcestershire (squad no. 54)
- 2025: Desert Vipers
- FC debut: 3 July 2016 Somerset v Pakistanis
- LA debut: 26 July 2015 Somerset v Derbyshire

Career statistics
Competition	FC	LA	T20
Matches	65	31	198
Runs scored	3,160	778	4,534
Batting average	28.72	31.12	28.69
100s/50s	3/18	1/4	2/23
Top score	266	101*	119
Catches/stumpings	38/–	17/–	94/–
- Source: Cricinfo, 27 September 2026

Adam John Hose (born 25 October 1992) is an English cricketer who plays for Worcestershire County Cricket Club. He is a right-handed batsman, who also bowls right-arm medium-fast pace.

== Domestic career ==
Hose joined Somerset on a 14-month contract in July 2015, and made his debut in the 2015 NatWest t20 Blast against Hampshire. On 3 July 2016 he made his first-class debut for Somerset during Pakistan's tour of England.

On 26 July 2017, Hose rejected the offer of a new three-year contract from Somerset to join Warwickshire with immediate effect. On 30 July 2017, Hose scored a match-winning 76 off 43 balls on debut for Warwickshire against Lancashire in the 2017 NatWest t20 Blast.

In December 2018, he was signed by the Wellington Firebirds to play in the 2018–19 Super Smash in New Zealand. In April 2022, he was bought by the Northern Superchargers for the 2022 season of The Hundred.

In July 2022, it was announced Hose would join Worcestershire County Cricket Club on a three-year contract at the end of the 2022 season.

In August 2022, he was picked by the Adelaide Strikers to play in the 2022–23 Big Bash League season. On 31 December 2022, he struck his maiden half-century in Big Bash League, scoring unbeaten 56 runs off 41 balls for Adelaide Strikers against the Melbourne Stars.

Hose made his Worcestershire County Championship debut in April 2023 in a match vs Derbyshire which resulted in victory.

In May 2024, Hose was appointed as the new vice-captain of Worcestershire for the T20 Blast. He signed a new three-year contract with the club in November 2024.

On 29 June 2025, he scored his maiden first-class double century, compiling 266 off 253 balls including 31 4s and seven 6s for Worcestershire against Hampshire at the Utilita Bowl.

In October 2026, Hose agreed a three-year contract extension with Worcestershire, tying him into the club until at least the end of the 2029 season.
