= Henry Hunt (cricketer) =

Australian cricketer (born 1997)

Personal information
- Full name: Henry James Hunt
- Born: 7 January 1997 (age 29); Cowra, New South Wales, Australia
- Batting: Right-handed
- Role: Opening batter
- Relatives: Clare Hunt (sister)

Domestic team information
- Years: Team
- 2019/20–present: South Australia (squad no. 22)
- 2021/22–2022/23: Adelaide Strikers (squad no. 22)

Career statistics
Competition	FC	LA	T20
Matches	68	23	9
Runs scored	4,169	780	154
Batting average	32.57	37.14	17.11
100s/50s	12/16	1/5	0/0
Top score	162	103	49
Catches/stumpings	37/–	8/–	3/–
- Source: Cricinfo, 23 October 2026

Henry James Hunt (born 7 January 1997) is an Australian cricketer, currently playing for South Australia as an opening batter.

== Early life ==
Hunt grew up living on a farm near a small town between Grenfell and Cowra in New South Wales. His father, James Hunt, had played for the Canberra Raiders, a rugby league team, and built a cricket net in the backyard of their family home. He has two younger sisters, Anna and Clare, who is a member of the national soccer team.

== Cricket career ==
Hunt played grade cricket for Queanbeyan District and was first selected to play for the ACT/NSW Country Comets in the 2014–15 season of the Futures League. Hunt played for Australia under-19s in 2015–16, and he was named in Australia's squad that was scheduled to play in the 2016 Under-19 Cricket World Cup, but withdrew from the tournament due to security concerns.

In the 2018–19 season Hunt scored 208 in a Futures League match against Queensland Under-23s, followed by another four half-centuries during the season. He was the tournament's leading run-scorer with 737 runs at an average of 46.06. During the 2018–19 season, Hunt also played for Eastern Suburbs in Sydney Grade Cricket, and he equalled Johan Botha's record for the fastest Twenty20 century in the competition, scoring 104 runs off 45 deliveries against UNSW.

On the back of his performances in the 2018–19 season, Hunt earned a rookie contract with South Australia for the 2019–20 season. He made his first-class debut on 10 October 2019, against Victoria in the 2019–20 Sheffield Shield season. In his first innings, he scored his maiden half-century, finishing with a total of 75 runs.

On 11 November 2019, in a Sheffield Shield match against Tasmania, Hunt scored his maiden century in first-class cricket in just his fourth first-class match. He scored 132 and had a 293-run partnership with Jake Weatherald, breaking a 52-year-old record for the highest opening partnership for South Australia in first-class cricket. In Hunt's innings he hit 17 boundaries, including a six. Hunt followed up his century with another half-century in the second innings.

He made his List A debut on 28 November 2021, for South Australia in the 2021–22 Marsh One-Day Cup. On 25 February 2022, Hunt was named as captain of South Australia for the remainder of the 2021–22 Sheffield Shield season in the absence of Travis Head and Alex Carey. He made his Twenty20 debut on 2 January 2022, for the Adelaide Strikers in the 2021-22 Big Bash. On 9 October 2022, Hunt secured a draw against Victoria by facing 326 balls for 97 runs and batting out the final day. Hunt stood down from the captaincy before the end of the 2022–23 Sheffield Shield season to focus solely on batting.

In February 2024, Hunt was ruled out of the remainder of the 2023-24 summer following a fielding incident during a Marsh One Day Cup match against Victoria.

Hunt was part of the South Australian squad that won the 2024-25 One-Day Cup, however did not play in the final.
