= Liam O'Connor (cricketer) =

Australian cricketer

Personal information
- Full name: Liam Nicholas O'Connor
- Born: 20 June 1993 (age 33); Perth, Western Australia
- Batting: Right-handed
- Bowling: Right arm leg break
- Role: Bowler

Domestic team information
- Years: Team
- 2016–present: Adelaide Strikers

Career statistics
Competition	FC	LA	T20
Matches	3	4	23
Runs scored	0	0	7
Batting average	0.00	0.00	1.75
100s/50s	0/0	0/0	0/0
Top score	0*	0*	2
Balls bowled	516	198	456
Wickets	10	4	15
Bowling average	33.50	48.75	39.06
5 wickets in innings	1	0	0
10 wickets in match	0	0	0
Best bowling	5/131	3/35	3/30
Catches/stumpings	0/–	1/–	8/–
- Source: Cricinfo, 4 October 2021

Liam O'Connor (born 20 June 1993) is an Australian cricketer. He was previously contracted with the Western Warriors, Western Australia's state team, but initially he did not play any first-class or List A matches for the state. Since 2016, he has played for the Adelaide Strikers in the Big Bash League, being brought into the squad for BBL|06 as an injury replacement, winning the tournament with the team in BBL|07. In 2019, he made his first-class and List A debuts for Western Australia.

== Cricket career ==
O'Connor first started to gain attention in the 2014–15 season playing grade cricket in Perth for Bayswater-Morley District Cricket Club. In 15 games in the premier division he took 29 wickets, enough to earn himself a rookie contract with the Western Warriors, Western Australia's state team, for the 2015–16 season. Though he came close to a Sheffield Shield debut, he did not get into the state team and instead played for Western Australia Under-23s in the Futures League. He was the team's leading wicket taker with 28 wickets from just six games. As a result of his strong form he was upgraded to a full contract with the state for the 2016–17 season.

Despite now being on a full contract with Western Australia, O'Connor still did not make his debut for Western Australia in either first-class or List A cricket. Shortly before the 2016–17 Big Bash League season he did not have a contract with any of the eight franchises, but Adelaide Strikers spinner Jon Holland was injured and unable to compete in the tournament, so the Strikers needed to find a replacement player. Strikers captain Brad Hodge had previously coached Western Australian wicket-keeper Josh Inglis in a tour match, so Inglis suggested that O'Connor would be a good bowler to sign. The Strikers signed him for the season, and he ended up playing every game in the first half of the tournament. His standout performance came when he took the wickets of Moises Henriques and Sean Abbott in the New Year's Eve match to achieve bowling figures of 2/12 in a win.

As a result of his strong performances, O'Connor was re-signed by the Strikers for BBL|07, but he was not offered another contract with Western Australia. Throughout the tournament he was unable to play because Strikers' international player Rashid Khan was the team's main spinner, being the leading wicket-taker of the tournament. O'Connor played his only match of BBL|07 in the final against the Hobart Hurricanes, while Khan was on international duty with Afghanistan. He was the second-most economical bowler on the day with figures of 0/27, only two boundaries hit off of his bowling. The Strikers won the match and the tournament. Before returning to Perth at the end of the tournament he went to Brisbane to help the Papua New Guinea spinners in the team's training camp ahead of the 2018 Cricket World Cup Qualifier.

He made his first-class debut for Western Australia in the 2018–19 Sheffield Shield season on 23 February 2019. He made his List A debut on 31 October 2019, for Western Australia in the 2019–20 Marsh One-Day Cup.

== Personal life ==
O'Connor worked as an insurance broker for Robinson Insurance Broking, playing cricket part-time. He now works for SEDA College WA as their Human Resources Advisor.
