= Matthew Short =

Australian cricketer (born 1995)

Personal information
- Full name: Matthew William Short
- Born: 8 November 1995 (age 31); Ballarat, Victoria, Australia
- Height: 1.87 m (6 ft 2 in)
- Batting: Right-handed
- Bowling: Right-arm off break
- Role: Batting all-rounder

International information
- National side: Australia (2023–present)
- ODI debut (cap 242): 22 September 2023 v India
- Last ODI: 11 June 2026 v Bangladesh
- ODI shirt no.: 5
- T20I debut (cap 107): 30 August 2023 v South Africa
- Last T20I: 1 February 2026 v Pakistan
- T20I shirt no.: 5

Domestic team information
- Years: Team
- 2014/15–present: Victoria
- 2014/15–2017/18: Melbourne Renegades
- 2015/16–2017/18: Cricket Australia XI
- 2018/19–present: Adelaide Strikers
- 2023: Punjab Kings
- 2023: Washington Freedom
- 2023–2024: Northern Superchargers
- 2025: San Francisco Unicorns
- 2026: Chennai Super Kings

Career statistics
Competition	ODI	T20I	FC	LA
Matches	23	24	62	92
Runs scored	462	416	3,182	2,432
Batting average	22.00	20.80	34.21	30.40
100s/50s	0/4	0/1	4/20	2/15
Top score	74	66	134*	134
Balls bowled	462	108	3,366	2,076
Wickets	6	9	46	34
Bowling average	67.83	22.88	37.17	56.52
5 wickets in innings	0	1	0	0
10 wickets in match	0	0	0	0
Best bowling	3/36	5/22	4/57	3/36
Catches/stumpings	10/–	16/–	73/–	45/–
- Source: ESPNcricinfo, 25 October 2026

Matthew William Short (born 8 November 1995) is an Australian international cricketer who represents the Australia national team in limited overs cricket. A right-handed top-order batter who bowls right-arm off break, Short plays for Victoria at state level, captains the Adelaide Strikers in the Big Bash League and plays for the Chennai Super Kings in Indian Premier League.

== Domestic career ==
Short made his one day debut on 20 July 2014 for the Australia National Performance Squad against South Africa A, as part of the Australia A Team Quadrangular Series in 2014. He made his first-class debut for Cricket Australia XI on 29 October 2015 in a tour match against the New Zealanders as part of New Zealand's tour to Australia. He scored his maiden first-class century playing for Cricket Australia XI in a tour match against England at Townsville in mid-November 2017, scoring 51 in the first innings and then 134 not out in the second. He also took 4/103 with the ball.

In 2019, Short had a stint in England in club cricket for Coggeshall Town CC scoring 1100 runs at an average of 55.

For the 2021–22 Big Bash League season, Short moved from the middle order to open the batting, finishing the season with the second most sixes (26) and third-most runs (493). Strikers captain Peter Siddle said of the move: "Last year was all about finding a position for him because he’s been thrown around for a few years and hasn’t been able to lock down a spot ... We found that spot for him last year and he got all the confidence from being at the top of the order. He’s fearless and we saw that against the Sixers."

On 5 January 2023, captaining the Strikers in Peter Siddle's absence, Short made his maiden century in the Big Bash League, scoring 100* from 59 balls in the highest run chase in BBL history (230 runs). Bowling himself for 4 overs, he also had figures of 1/34. On 30 January 2023, Short was named BBL12 Player of the Tournament at the Australian Cricket Awards.

In March 2023, he was brought in by Punjab Kings for the 2023 Indian Premier League as an injury replacement for Jonny Bairstow.

In December 2025, he was brought in by Chennai Super Kings in the mini auction held in Abu Dhabi for the 2026 Indian Premier League.

Having spent a couple of years living on the Gold Coast but travelling to Victoria to play domestically, Short opted out of a Victorian state contract for the 2025-26 summer, but remained available to play for them.

== International career ==
Short made his international and Twenty20 International debut against South Africa on 30 August 2023. On September 1, 2023 in the 2nd T20I of the series, Short scored his maiden half century in international cricket scoring 66 off just 30 balls. An innings that steered Australia to a comfortable victory over South Africa. Short Featured in each match of Australia’s 3-0 sweep of South Africa.

On 22 September 2023, Short made his One Day International debut against India.

On 23 November 2023, Short took his first wicket in T20I’s and international cricket against India as Steve Smith caught Yashasvi Jaiswal off his bowling for 21.

In May 2024, he was named as a reserve player in Australia’s squad for the 2024 ICC Men's T20 World Cup tournament.

In September 2024, Short was selected as part of a white ball tour against England. In the second T20I, he took his maiden five-wicket haul, taking 5 for 22 and recording the third best figures for an Australian bowler in T20Is. In the fifth ODI, he scored his maiden ODI half-century off just 23 balls.

== Personal life ==
Short is married to Australian swimmer Madison Wilson. The couple have a son.
