= Adelaide Strikers =

Australian men's cricket team

- Nickname: Strikers
- League: Big Bash League
- Association: Cricket Australia

Personnel
- Captain: Matt Short
- Coach: Tim Paine
- Owner: South Australian Cricket Association

Team information
- City: Adelaide, South Australia
- Colours: Blue
- Founded: 2011; 15 years ago
- Home ground: Adelaide Oval
- Capacity: 53,583

History
- Big Bash League wins: 1 (BBL |07)
- Official website: adelaidestrikers.com.au
T20 kit

The Adelaide Strikers are an Australian men's professional franchise cricket team, competing in Australia's domestic Twenty20 (T20) cricket competition, the Big Bash League (BBL). Based in Adelaide, South Australia, their home ground is the Adelaide Oval, and they play in a cornflower blue uniform. The Strikers were formed in 2011 to play in the BBL, succeeding the South Australia cricket team, who played in the now-defunct KFC Twenty20 Big Bash competition. Since the inaugural BBL |01, the Strikers' sole title came in BBL |07.

== History ==
The Adelaide Strikers were formed in 2011, as a result of the formation of the Big Bash League. When the competition was first formed, each team had an opportunity to sign up players and build their lists. The contracting window opened on 30 June 2011 at 9 am and closed on 22 July 2011. Each team was allowed to sign up to 18 players, including up to two from overseas. The team's inaugural captain was South Australia captain, Michael Klinger, and the inaugural coach was Darren Berry, the then coach of the Southern Redbacks.

In the 2016/17 Big Bash, the Adelaide Strikers were rated the most entertaining team in the BBL, with a BBEI of 2177.

== New Year's Eve match ==
Since BBL03, Cricket Australia started hosting a Strikers home match on 31 December night every year against different oppositions. It quickly gained popularity among the fans, turning into a tradition and attracting big crowds at the Adelaide Oval throughout the years. It is popularly termed as the New Year's Eve Match or NYE Clash in the media. Up until BBL08, the Strikers had maintained a clean 6–0 win record in the NYE Big Bash clashes. In season 3, Travis Head scored a brilliant century to take the Strikers home against Sydney Sixers in the NYE clash, which remains one of the most memorable NYE matches in the short history of BBL to date. Though, in BBL09, the Strikers finally fell against the Sydney Thunder by 3 runs, the Strikers' first defeat on New Year's Eve.

=== List of New Year's Eve matches ===
Year	Winner	Loser	Margin	Attendance	Player of the match
2013	Strikers	Scorchers	6 wickets	26,030	Michael Klinger
2014	Strikers	Hurricanes	8 wickets	43,288	Tim Ludeman
2015	Strikers	Sixers	5 wickets	46,389	Travis Head
2016	Strikers	Sixers	48 runs	45,471	Sean Abbott
2017	Strikers	Heat	56 runs	46,594	Michael Neser
2018	Strikers	Thunder	20 runs	41,987	Peter Siddle
2019	Thunder	Strikers	3 runs	41,414	Callum Ferguson
2020	Scorchers	Strikers	7 wickets	21,636	Jhye Richardson
2021	Thunder	Strikers	22 runs	9,555	Jason Sangha
2022	Stars	Strikers	8 runs	40,373	Marcus Stoinis
2023	Stars	Strikers	7 wickets	42,502	Marcus Stoinis
2024	Scorchers	Strikers	7 wickets	41,624	Cooper Connolly
2025	Strikers	Heat	7 wickets	40,713	Liam Scott

== Season summaries ==
Chart of yearly table positions for Adelaide Strikers in BBL

Season	W–L	Pos.	Finals	Coach	Captain	Most Runs	Most Wickets	Most Valuable Player	Refs
2011–12	2–5	6th	DNQ	Darren Berry	Michael Klinger	Michael Klinger – 198	Aaron O'Brien – 6	Michael Klinger	
2012–13	4–4	5th	DNQ	Darren Berry	Johan Botha	Michael Klinger – 242	Kane Richardson – 10	Johan Botha	
2013–14	2–5	7th	DNQ	Darren Berry	Johan Botha (Note: Phillip Hughes stood in as acting captain for two games.)	Michael Klinger – 223	Shaun Tait – 11	Michael Neser	
2014–15	6–1*	1st*	SF	Darren Berry	Johan Botha	Tim Ludeman – 253	Ben Laughlin – 13	Adam Zampa	
2015–16	7–1*	1st*	SF	Jason Gillespie	Brad Hodge	Travis Head – 299	Adil Rashid – 16	Adil Rashid	
2016–17	3–5	6th	DNQ	Jason Gillespie	Brad Hodge	Ben Dunk – 364*	Ish Sodhi – 9 (Note: Ben Laughlin and Chris Jordan also took 9 wickets, but at a higher bowling average.)	Ben Dunk	
2017–18	7–3	2nd	C	Jason Gillespie	Travis Head (Note: Colin Ingram stood in as acting captain for three games.)	Alex Carey – 443	Rashid Khan – 18* (Note: Dwayne Bravo from the Melbourne Renegades also took 18 wickets.)	Rashid Khan	
2018–19	6–8	7th	DNQ	Jason Gillespie	Travis Head (Note: Colin Ingram stood in as acting captain for 11 games.)	Jon Wells – 359	Rashid Khan – 19	Rashid Khan	
2019–20	8–5	3rd	KF	Jason Gillespie	Travis Head (Note: Alex Carey stood in as acting captain for seven games.)	Jon Wells – 478	Peter Siddle – 19 (Note: Rashid Khan also took 19 wickets but at a higher bowling average.)	Jon Wells	
2020–21	7–7	5th	EF	Jason Gillespie	Travis Head (Note: Alex Carey and Peter Siddle stood in as acting captain for nine and two games respectively.)	Jake Weatherald – 433	Wes Agar – 22	Wes Agar	
2021–22	6–8	4th	CF	Jason Gillespie	Peter Siddle	Jon Wells – 501	Peter Siddle – 30^ (Note: Tied with Daniel Sams who also took 30 wickets in BBL|09.)	Matt Short	
2022–23	5–9	7th	DNQ	Jason Gillespie	Travis Head (Note: Peter Siddle and Matt Short stood in as acting captain for eight and two games respectively.)	Matt Short – 458	Wes Agar – 18	Matt Short*	
2023–24	5–4	4th	CF	Jason Gillespie	Matt Short	Matt Short – 541*	Jamie Overton – 16	Matt Short*	
2024–25	3–7	8th	DNQ	Tim Paine	Matt Short (Note: Alex Ross stood in as acting captain for three games.)	Alex Ross – 256	Lloyd Pope – 15	Jamie Overton	
2025–26	4–6	6th	DNQ	Tim Paine	Matt Short	Liam Scott – 310	Lloyd Pope – 15	Liam Scott	

Legend
DNQ	Did not qualify	CF	Lost the Challenger	*	Led the league
EF	Lost the Eliminator	SF	Semi-finalists	^	League record
KF	Lost the Knockout	RU	Runners-up	C	Champions

== Captaincy records ==
There have been 10 captains in the Strikers' history, including matches featuring an acting captain.

Span	Captain	M	Won	Lost	Tied	NR	W–L%
2011–12	Michael Klinger	7	2	5	0	0	28.57
2012–15	Johan Botha	23	12	9	0	2	57.14
2014	Phillip Hughes	2	0	2	0	0	0.00
2015–17	Brad Hodge	17	10	7	0	0	58.82
2017–24	Travis Head	28	17	11	0	0	60.71
2018	Colin Ingram	14	5	9	0	0	35.71
2019–25	Alex Carey	16	7	8	0	1	46.66
2020–23	Peter Siddle	27	12	15	0	0	44.44
2023–26	Matt Short	31	14	16	0	1	46.67
2024–25	Alex Ross	3	1	2	0	0	33.33

== Home grounds ==
Venue	Games hosted by season															
Venue	01	02	03	04	05	06	07	08	09	10	11	12	13	14	15	Total
Adelaide Oval	3	4	4	5	5	4	6	7	8	5	7	7	5	5	5	80
TIO Traeger Park	0	0	0	0	0	0	1	0	0	0	0	0	0	0	0	1

== Current squad ==
The squad of the Adelaide Strikers for the 2026–27 Big Bash League season as of 12 September 2026.

- Players with international caps are listed in **bold**.

S/N	Name	Nat.	Date of Birth	Batting Style	Bowling Style	Additional Info.
Batters
32	**Mark Chapman**	New Zealand	27 June 1994 (age 32)	Left-handed	Left-arm orthodox	International Signing
15	Mackenzie Harvey	Australia	18 September 2000 (age 26)	Left-handed	Right-arm medium	
31	Thomas Kelly	Australia	14 December 2000 (age 25)	Right-handed	Right-arm medium	
23	Jason Sangha	Australia	8 September 1999 (age 27)	Right-handed	Right-arm leg spin	
All-rounders
6	**Liam Scott**	Australia	12 December 2000 (age 25)	Right-handed	Right-arm fast	
2	**Matt Short**	Australia	8 November 1995 (age 30)	Right-handed	Right-arm off spin	Captain
55	**Ben Stokes**	England	4 June 1991 (age 35)	Left-handed	Right-arm fast-medium	International Signing
55	Jerrssis Wadia	Australia	22 November 2001 (age 24)	Left-handed	Left-arm orthodox	
Wicket-keepers
5	**Alex Carey**	Australia	27 August 1991 (age 35)	Left-handed	—N/a	
Bowlers
24	Lloyd Pope	Australia	1 December 1999 (age 26)	Right-handed	Right-arm leg spin	
58	Henry Thornton	Australia	16 December 1996 (age 29)	Right-handed	Right-arm fast	
45	Tom Straker	Australia	19 March 2005 (age 21)	Right-handed	Right-arm fast	

== Players ==
=== Australian representatives ===
The following is a list of cricketers who have played for the Strikers after making their debut in the national men's team (the period they spent as both a Strikers squad member and an Australian-capped player is in brackets):

- Callum Ferguson (BBL|01–03)
- Nathan Lyon (BBL|01–02)
- Bryce McGain (BBL|01)
- Phillip Hughes (BBL|02–03)
- Kane Richardson (BBL|02–06)
- Shaun Tait (BBL|02–04)
- Brad Young (BBL|02)
- Brad Hodge (BBL|04–06)
- Ben Laughlin (BBL|04–08)
- Ben Dunk (BBL|06)
- Travis Head (BBL|06–15)
- Billy Stanlake (BBL|06–09)
- Alex Carey (BBL|07–16)
- Peter Siddle (BBL|07–12)
- Michael Neser (BBL|08–10)
- Cameron White (BBL|09)
- Matt Renshaw (BBL|10–11)
- Daniel Worrall (BBL|10–11)
- Wes Agar (BBL|11–13)
- Fawad Ahmed (BBL|11)
- Cameron Boyce (BBL|12–15)
- Chris Lynn (BBL|12–15)
- D'Arcy Short (BBL|13–14)
- Matt Short (BBL|13–16)
- Liam Scott (BBL|16)

=== Overseas marquees ===
- (South Africa) Johan Botha (BBL|01–04)
- (New Zealand) James Franklin (BBL|01)
- (South Africa) Alfonso Thomas (BBL|01)
- (Pakistan) Saeed Ajmal (BBL|02)
- (Cricket West Indies) Kieron Pollard (BBL|02, 04, 06)
- (Bangladesh) Shakib Al Hasan (BBL|03)
- (England) Alex Hales (BBL|03)
- (Netherlands) Ryan ten Doeschate (BBL|04)
- (Sri Lanka) Mahela Jayawardene (BBL|05)
- (England) Adil Rashid (BBL|05)
- (England) Chris Jordan (BBL|06)
- (New Zealand) Ish Sodhi (BBL|06)
- (South Africa) Colin Ingram (BBL|07–08)
- (Afghanistan) Rashid Khan (BBL|07–12)
- (England) Phil Salt (BBL|09–10)
- (England) Danny Briggs (BBL|10)
- (England) Ian Cockbain (BBL|11)
- (England) George Garton (BBL|11)
- (New Zealand) Colin de Grandhomme (BBL|12)
- (England) Adam Hose (BBL|12–13)
- (England) Jamie Overton (BBL|13–15)
- (England) David Payne (BBL|13)
- (Cricket West Indies) Fabian Allen (BBL|14)
- (England) Ollie Pope (BBL|14)
- (Pakistan) Hassan Ali (BBL|15)
- (England) Luke Wood (BBL|15)
- (South Africa) Tabraiz Shamsi (BBL|15)
- (England) Ben Stokes (BBL|16)
- (New Zealand) Mark Chapman (BBL|16)

== Honours ==
- Champions: 1 – BBL |07
- Runners Up: 0
- Minor Premiers: 2 – BBL |04, BBL |05
- Finals Appearances: 7 – BBL |04, BBL |05, BBL |07, BBL |09, BBL |10, BBL |11, BBL |13
- Wooden Spoons: 1 – BBL |14

== Records ==
As of 12 September 2026

=== Team records ===
==== Result summary v. opponent ====
Opposition	M	Won	Lost	Tied	NR	W–L%
Brisbane Heat	24	11	12	0	1	47.83
Hobart Hurricanes	26	14	11	0	1	56
Melbourne Renegades	21	13	8	0	0	61.9
Melbourne Stars	21	9	12	0	0	42.86
Perth Scorchers	29	12	17	0	0	41.38
Sydney Sixers	22	8	14	0	0	36.36
Sydney Thunder	25	13	10	0	2	56.52
Total	168	80	84	0	4	48.78

- Source: CricInfo

==== Highest innings score ====
As of 22 December 2023

Score	Opposition	Ground	Date
5/251	Brisbane Heat	Adelaide Oval	11 January 2025
3/230	Hobart Hurricanes	Adelaide Oval	5 January 2023
8/207	Hobart Hurricanes	Adelaide Oval	26 January 2020
4/205	Sydney Thunder	Adelaide Oval	19 December 2023
6/203	Hobart Hurricanes	Adelaide Oval	27 December 2024

=== Batting ===
==== Most career runs ====
As of 12 January 2025

Batsman	Years	Matches	Runs	High score
Matthew Short	2018–present	82	2,207	109
Jake Weatherald	2016–2025	93	2,176	115
Alex Carey	2017–present	59	1,890	101
Jonathan Wells	2017–2022	71	1,740	73
Travis Head	2013–present	57	1,394	101 *

==== Highest scores ====
As of 12 January 2025

Batsman	Runs	Opposition	Ground	Date
Jake Weatherald	115	Hobart Hurricanes	Adelaide Oval	4 February 2018
Matthew Short	109	Brisbane Heat	Adelaide Oval	11 January 2025
Travis Head	101 *	Sydney Sixers	Adelaide Oval	31 December 2015
Alex Carey	101	Brisbane Heat	Adelaide Oval	21 January 2021
Matthew Short	100 *	Hobart Hurricanes	Adelaide Oval	5 January 2023
Alex Carey	100	Hobart Hurricanes	Adelaide Oval	17 January 2018

==== Highest Averages ====
As of 22 December 2023

Batsman	Years	Innings	Average
Jamie Overton	2023–present	9	90.50
Ian Cockbain	2022-2022	6	59.75
Ben Dunk	2016-2017	8	52.00
Chris Lynn	2022–present	20	43.88
Adil Rashid	2015-2016	4	43.00

==== Highest Strike Rate ====
Player	Years	Innings	Strike Rate
Rashid Khan	2017–2023	49	150.37
Chris Lynn	2022–present	20	130.40
2019–2021	30	146.50	
Matthew Short	2018–present	73	141.51

==== Most Sixes ====
As of 22 December 2023

Player	Years	Innings	Amount
Matthew Short	2018–present	85	101
Jake Weatherald	2016–2025	89	85
Travis Head	2013–present	55	61
Alex Carey	2017–present	56	48

==== Most Ducks ====
Player	Years	Innings	Amount
Rashid Khan	2017–2023	49	7
Matthew Short	2018–present	80	6
Peter Siddle	2017-2023	22	5
Jake Lehmann	2016-2019	25	5

==== Highest partnerships by wicket ====
As of 11 January 2025

Wicket	Runs	Batters	Opposition	Ground	Date
1st	171	Alex Carey & Jake Weatherald	Hobart Hurricanes	Adelaide Oval	17 January 2018
2nd	140	Jake Weatherald & Travis Head	Hobart Hurricanes	Adelaide Oval	4 February 2018
3rd	107	Jake Weatherald & Alex Carey	Hobart Hurricanes	York Park, Launceston	15 December 2020
4th	104	Matthew Short & Jonathan Wells	Melbourne Renegades	Adelaide Oval	23 December 2018
5th	115	Brad Hodge & Alex Ross	Melbourne Stars	Adelaide Oval	18 December 2015
6th	59*	Travis Head & Adil Rashid	Sydney Sixers	Adelaide Oval	31 December 2015
7th	44	Johan Botha & Michael Neser	Melbourne Renegades	Docklands Stadium, Melbourne	2 January 2013
8th	55	Michael Neser & Kane Richardson	Perth Scorchers	WACA Ground, Perth	23 December 2016
9th	84*	Cameron Boyce & Brendan Doggett	Perth Scorchers	Adelaide Oval	31 December 2024
10th	61*	Daniel Worrall & Danny Briggs	Hobart Hurricanes	Blundstone Arena, Hobart	13 December 2020

=== Bowling ===
==== Most career wickets ====
As of 30 August 2023

Bowler	Seasons	Matches	Wickets	Best bowling
Rashid Khan	2017–23	69	98	6/17
Peter Siddle	2017–23	72	91	5/16
Wes Agar	2017–23	56	69	4/6
Michael Neser	2012–21	62	62	3/24
Ben Laughlin	2014–19	50	60	4/26

==== Best bowling figures ====
As of 30 August 2023

Bowler	Figures	Opposition	Ground	Date
Ish Sodhi	6/11	Sydney Thunder	Stadium Australia, Sydney	18 January 2017
Rashid Khan	6/17	Brisbane Heat	The Gabba, Brisbane	12 January 2021
Henry Thornton	5/3	Sydney Thunder	Stadium Australia, Sydney	16 December 2022
Peter Siddle	5/16	Hobart Hurricanes	York Park, Launceston	15 December 2020
Peter Siddle	5/23	Hobart Hurricanes	Adelaide Oval	5 January 2022

=== Fielding ===
==== Most Catches ====
Player	Span	Matches	Catches
Matthew Short	2018–25	82	48
Jake Weatherald	2016–25	93	34
Michael Neser	2012-21	62	30
Jonathan Wells	2017-22	71	24
Travis Head	2013-25	57	18

== Awards ==
- Player of the Match:
  - Travis Head and Matt Short – 8
  - Rashid Khan – 6
  - Jake Weatherald – 5
  - Jonathan Wells – 4
  - Wes Agar, Alex Carey, Tim Ludeman, Lloyd Pope, and Peter Siddle – 3
  - Cameron Boyce, Ian Cockbain, Colin Ingram, Michael Klinger, Peter Siddle, Chris Lynn, Jamie Overton, Adil Rashid, and Henry Thornton – 2
  - Fawad Ahmed, Johan Botha, Tom Cooper, Ben Dunk, Ryan Gibson, Phillip Hughes, Mahela Jayawardene, Michael Neser, Liam O'Connor, Kane Richardson, Alex Ross, Liam Scott, Tabraiz Shamsi, and Ish Sodhi – 1
- BBL Player of the Final:
  - Jake Weatherald – BBL|07
- BBL Player of the Tournament:
  - Matt Short (2) – BBL|12, BBL|13
- BBL Team of the Tournament:
  - Rashid Khan (4) – BBL|07, BBL|08, BBL|09, BBL|10
  - Matt Short (3) – BBL|11, BBL|12, BBL|13
  - Peter Siddle (2) – BBL|09, BBL|11
  - Chris Lynn (2) – BBL|12, BBL|13
  - Jamie Overton (2) – BBL|13, BBL|14
  - Travis Head – BBL|05
  - Adil Rashid – BBL|05
  - Ben Dunk – BBL|06
  - Brad Hodge – BBL|06
  - Ben Laughlin – BBL|06
  - Alex Carey – BBL|07
  - Jonathan Wells – BBL|09
  - Wes Agar – BBL|10
  - Cameron Boyce – BBL|13
  - Lloyd Pope – BBL|14, BBL|15
  - Liam Scott – BBL|15

== See also ==
- South Australian Cricket Association
- South Australia cricket team
