= Wes Agar =

Australian cricketer

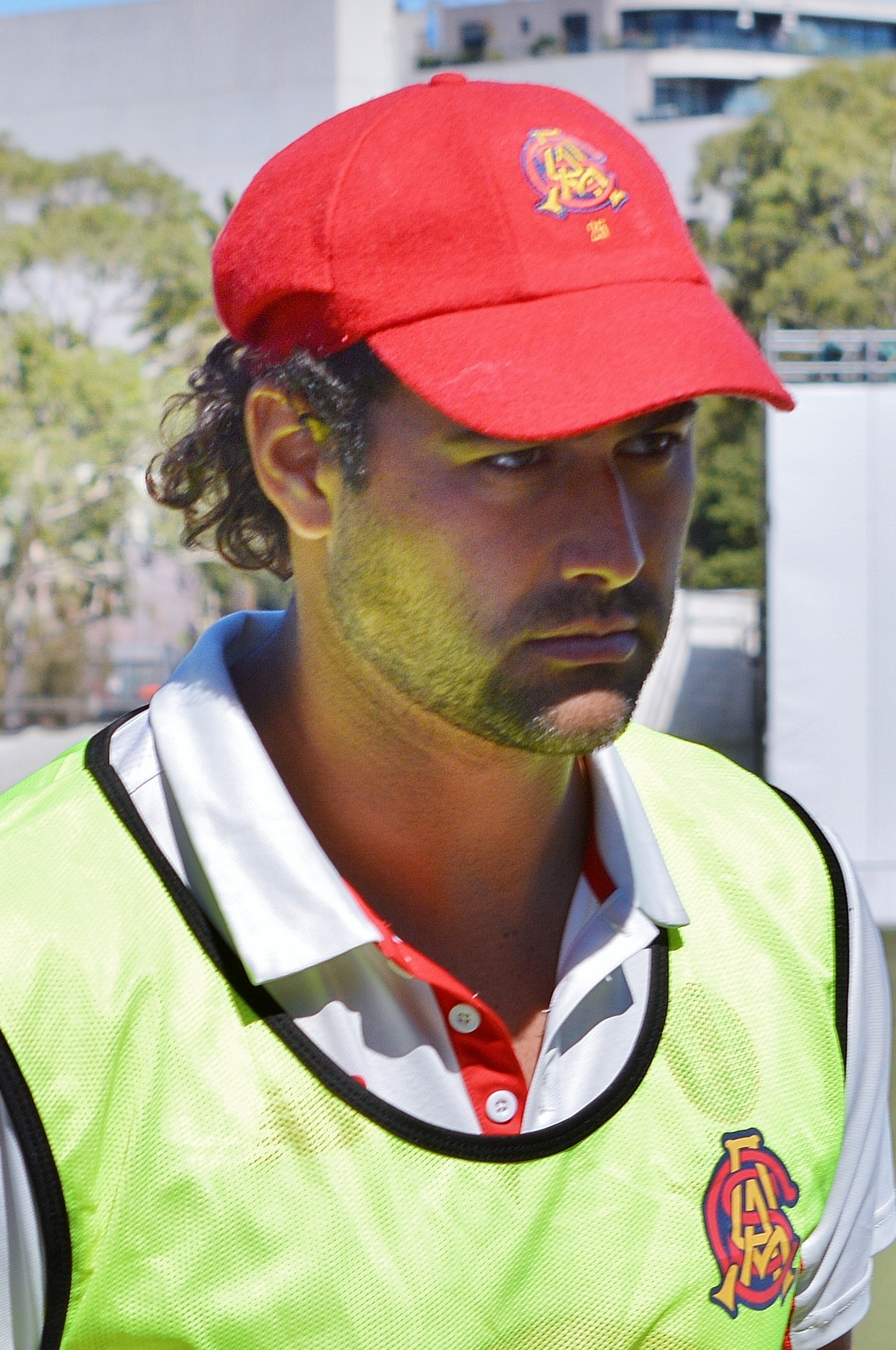
- Agar in March 2026

Personal information
- Full name: Wesley Austin Agar
- Born: 5 February 1997 (age 29); Malvern, Victoria, Australia
- Height: 191 cm (6 ft 3 in)
- Batting: Right-handed
- Bowling: Right-arm fast
- Role: Bowler
- Relatives: Ashton Agar (brother)

International information
- National side: Australia
- ODI debut (cap 231): 20 July 2021 v West Indies
- Last ODI: 22 July 2021 v West Indies
- ODI shirt no.: 25

Domestic team information
- Years: Team
- 2016/17: South Australia
- 2016/17–2023/24: Adelaide Strikers (squad no. 9)
- 2018/19: Victoria
- 2019/20–present: South Australia (squad no. 9)
- 2023–2025: Kent (squad no. 8)
- 2024/25: Sydney Thunder (squad no. 8)

Career statistics
Competition	ODI	FC	LA	T20
Matches	2	50	45	81
Runs scored	50	756	233	108
Batting average	25.00	12.39	12.94	6.75
100s/50s	0/0	0/2	0/0	0/0
Top score	41	57	41	15
Balls bowled	66	9,051	2,233	1,594
Wickets	0	155	59	100
Bowling average	–	32.60	37.50	24.19
5 wickets in innings	–	6	2	0
10 wickets in match	–	0	0	0
Best bowling	–	6/42	5/40	4/6
Catches/stumpings	0/–	15/–	15/–	15/–
- Source: Cricinfo, 18 October 2026

Wesley Austin Agar (born 5 February 1997) is an Australian cricketer. He is a fast bowler who has played for Australia's national youth team, and has played first-class and List A cricket for South Australia and Twenty20s for the Sydney Thunder. He is the younger brother of fellow Australian international cricketer, Ashton Agar. He made his international debut for Australia, in one-day internationals, in July 2021.

Agar spent his childhood in Victoria but moved to South Australia to seek more opportunities. He represented the state at under-19 level and was named in Australia's national under-19 squad for the 2016 Under-19 Cricket World Cup before Australia pulled out of the tournament. He had a rookie contract with South Australia and played his first matches at state level in the 2016–17 Matador BBQs One-Day Cup, after which he also signed with the Adelaide Strikers to play in the Big Bash League. In 2017, he was not given another contract with South Australia and returned to Victoria.

Agar returned to South Australia mid-2019 where he made his first-class debut on 18 October 2019. He went on to be the tied highest wicket taker in the Sheffield Shield competition and continued to impress South Australians, winning the 2020 Bradman Young Cricketer of the Year award.

== Early and personal life ==
Agar was born into a cricketing family. His father, John, was a fast bowler, and he was born the youngest of three brothers. His oldest brother, Ashton, has played Test cricket for Australia as a spin bowler and his other brother Will is a left-handed batsman who plays grade cricket. Agar chose to follow in his father's footsteps and became a fast bowler. Agar was diagnosed with obsessive–compulsive disorder (OCD).

== Career ==
=== Early career ===
Agar played Victorian Premier Cricket for the Monash Tigers, also known as the Richmond Cricket Club, making his first XI debut for the club at the age of sixteen. Double stress fractures in his back interrupted his 2014–15 season, but he was still able to win a premiership with the Tigers' second XI. During this stage of his career, he did not have the pace in his bowling or the physical build to reach higher success.

=== Move to South Australia (2015–2017) ===
Agar moved to South Australia in 2015 to seek out more opportunities. He joined Adelaide University's grade cricket team for the 2015–16 season. He had only $500 to his name and had to work part-time on a dairy farm to earn enough money to stay in Adelaide. Despite still being only a teenager, he rose to prominence, increasing his bowling speed to as high as 130 km/h. This made him the second fastest uncontracted bowler in South Australia at the time.

Agar was selected to play for South Australia in the under-19 national championships and took ten wickets at an average of 22.60, including an impressive 5/37 against Tasmania. His form through the tournament meant that in December 2015, he was named in Australia's squad for the 2016 Under-19 Cricket World Cup. Australia later pulled out of the world cup, but Agar had played three matches while in the squad in the United Arab Emirates.

Agar's form in the 2015–16 season brought him to the attention of both national and state selectors. During the 2016 winter, he was included in the 17-man National Performance Squad to train for two months at Australia's Centre of Excellence, and he was also given a rookie contract with South Australia's state team. His first appearance for South Australia came in the 2016–17 Matador BBQs One-Day Cup, when he made his List A debut on 2 October 2016. During the tournament, he took eight wickets in five matches, his consistent form earning him a contract with Big Bash League franchise the Adelaide Strikers. He made his Twenty20 debut for the Strikers in the 2016–17 Big Bash League season on 10 January 2017.

=== Return to Victoria (2017–2019) ===
At the end of the 2016–17 season, Agar did not sign another contract with South Australia, and instead decided to return to Victoria to try to win a contract with the Bushrangers. Despite this move, he remained with the Adelaide Strikers for BBL|07, but wasn't a regular member of the Strikers' team. He played his only match of the tournament against the Perth Scorchers, who his brother Ashton was playing for. This was the first time they had played against each other in a cricket match. Wes bowled two balls to Ashton, who hit him for two runs.

=== Return to South Australia (2019–present) ===
Agar returned to South Australia in mid-2019 and made his first-class debut on 18 October 2019, for South Australia in the 2019–20 Sheffield Shield season. In consecutive List A matches for South Australia in late 2019, he took 5 for 69 against Queensland and 5 for 40 against Western Australia. He continued to impress for South Australia throughout the Sheffield Shield, ending the season with 33 wickets in eight matches at 24.21, the most of anyone from South Australia and equal-second most in the competition. Agar also translated this form to the Big Bash League, taking 17 wickets in 12 matches for the Strikers.

Agar's impressive domestic season across all formats saw him named the 2020 Bradman Young Cricketer Of The Year. In June 2021, Agar was named in Australia's limited overs squad for their tours of the West Indies and Bangladesh. Agar made his One Day International (ODI) debut on 20 July 2021, for Australia against the West Indies. He scored 41 runs off 36 balls in his first match.

In February 2024, Agar was called up to the Twenty20 International squad against the West Indies as a replacement to Josh Hazlewood, although he did not play.

== Player profile ==
Agar is a right-handed batsman and a right-arm fast bowler. He has focused on bowling quickly, bowling at speeds of up to 130 km/h (81 mph) when he was still a teenager. By 2017, he was aiming to bowl consistently at 140 km/h (87 mph), a feat that most bowlers can't achieve. He is also a useful batsman, and Troy Cooley, the coach at the Centre of Excellence, has said that his older brother Ashton adopted his batting approach to improve his own batting.
