= Jake Weatherald =

Australian cricketer

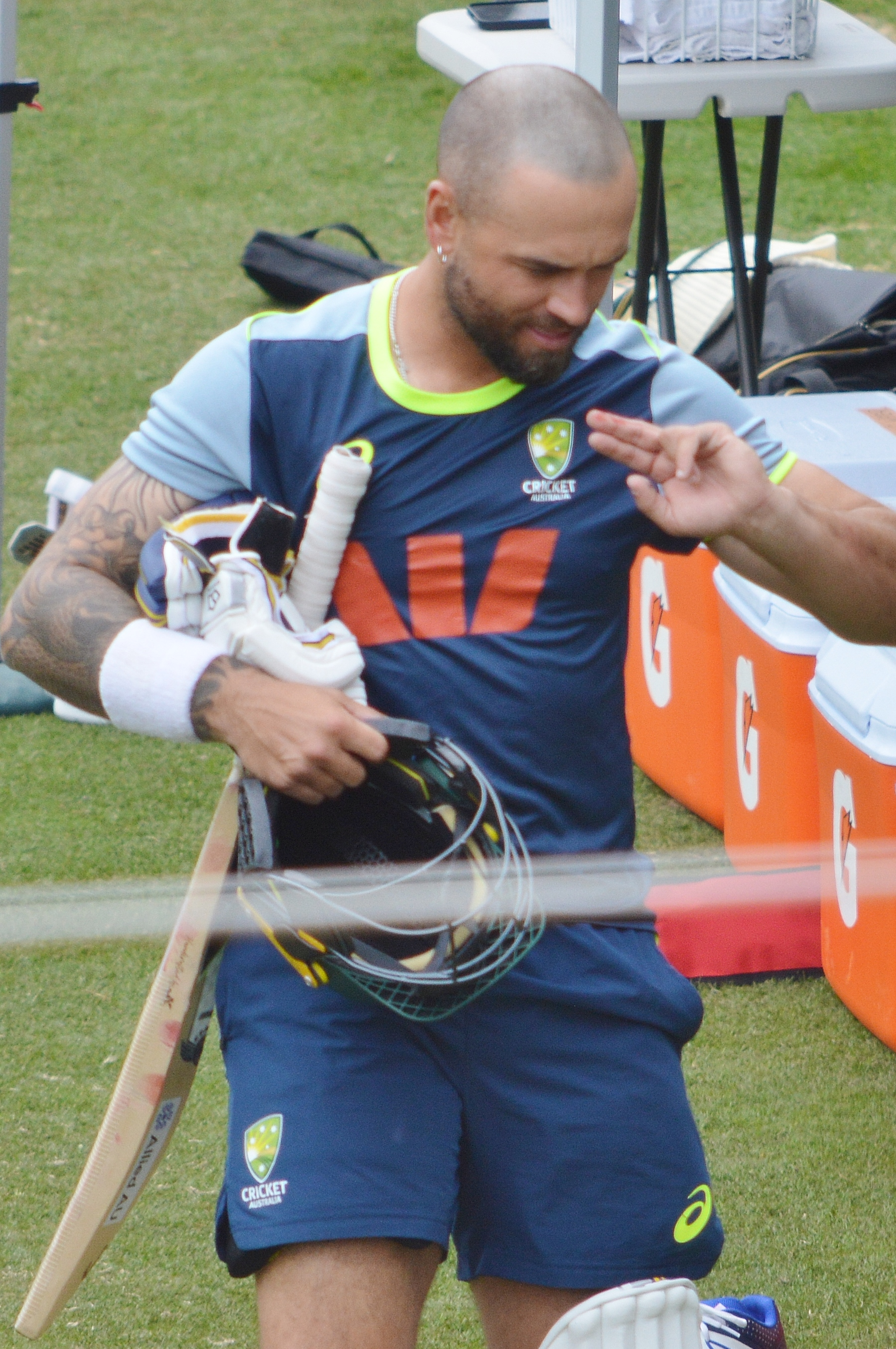
- Weatherald in December 2025

Personal information
- Full name: Jake Beath Weatherald
- Born: 4 November 1994 (age 32); Darwin, Northern Territory, Australia
- Batting: Left-handed
- Bowling: Leg-break
- Role: Opening batter
- Relatives: Tim Weatherald (cousin)

International information
- National side: Australia (2025–present)
- Test debut (cap 473): 21 November 2025 v England
- Last Test: 13 August 2026 v Bangladesh

Domestic team information
- Years: Team
- 2015/16–2022/23, 2026/27–present: South Australia
- 2016/17–2024/25: Adelaide Strikers
- 2021: Quetta Gladiators
- 2023/24–2025/26: Tasmania
- 2025/26–present: Hobart Hurricanes
- 2026: Leicestershire

Career statistics
Competition	Test	FC	LA	T20
Matches	6	94	53	98
Runs scored	224	6,325	1,694	2,324
Batting average	20.36	37.20	34.57	25.82
100s/50s	0/1	14/32	4/9	1/15
Top score	72	198	141	115
Balls bowled	–	78	5	–
Wickets	–	1	0	–
Bowling average	–	63.00	–	–
5 wickets in innings	–	0	–	–
10 wickets in match	–	0	–	–
Best bowling	–	1/14	–	–
Catches/stumpings	1/–	69/–	18/–	35/–
- Source: ESPNCricinfo, 23 October 2026

Jake Beath Weatherald (born 4 November 1994) is an Australian cricketer. Originally from Darwin in the Northern Territory, he is an opening batsman who plays for South Australia in both first-class and one-day cricket and plays for the Hobart Hurricanes in the Big Bash League. Weatherald has also previously played domestic cricket for Tasmania.

== Early life ==
Weatherald was born and raised in Darwin, Northern Territory. Growing up, Weatherald played tennis alongside cricket. In his mid teens he moved to Adelaide where he began his domestic career. Jake is the cousin of former Australian rules footballer Tim Weatherald.

== Domestic career ==
=== Beginnings (2013–2017) ===
Weatherald began his cricket career in Darwin, and he got his first major opportunities in the West End Premier League, playing for the Northern Territory Strike. He had early successes, scoring a century against Papua New Guinea in 2013. He then began playing grade cricket in South Australia, initially playing for Sturt as a wicket keeper-batsman before changing clubs to Adelaide University before the 2015–16 season. He first made his way into the South Australia cricket team in February 2016, replacing underperforming veteran Mark Cosgrove. He scored a half-century in his first-class debut with 58 from 83 balls against New South Wales. He played for South Australia through the rest of the season as they made their way to the 2015–16 Sheffield Shield final, in which he scored two half-centuries. His form was strong enough to displace Cosgrove on South Australia's contracted player list for the 2016–17 season.

Weatherald was included in South Australia's squad for the 2016–17 Matador BBQs One-Day Cup, in which he made his List A debut against Western Australia, scoring 41 runs. His best performance of the tournament came against Cricket Australia XI when, opening the batting, he reached his half-century in 31 balls and his century in just 66. He finished with 141 runs, including 17 fours and six sixes on the small ground of Hurstville Oval. Throughout the tournament Weatherald scored a total of 284 runs at a strike rate of 108.81 runs per 100 balls, earning himself a contract with Big Bash League team the Adelaide Strikers. Across all three forms of cricket, first-class, one-day and Twenty20, Weatherald was the highest run-scorer in Australian domestic cricket under the age of 25 from 11 December 2015 to 9 December 2016, the voting period for the 2017 Bradman Young Cricketer of the Year. He was the runner-up for the award, only behind Australian Test player Hilton Cartwright.

Weatherald continued to play for South Australia in the 2016–17 Sheffield Shield season, taking part in his second successive Sheffield Shield final. In addition to scoring 60 runs in the first innings, his third successive half-century in Shield finals, he took his maiden first-class wicket. In his first over in domestic cricket, he bowled former Australian Twenty20 captain Aaron Finch around his legs.

=== Breakout season (2017–2018) ===
In the leadup to the 2017–18 season, Weatherald played in an Australian intra-squad match in Darwin as the national team prepared for their upcoming tour of Bangladesh. He played for a David Warner XI and scored 96 runs from just 52 balls in the first innings, though he was not one of the players in the Australian squad itself and did not go to Bangladesh.

Weatherald hit form in the 2017–18 JLT One-Day Cup, opening the batting with Alex Carey. The two of them had three hundred-run opening partnerships, including a 212-run opening stand in the elimination final against Victoria, and scored two centuries himself. He also hit career-best form in the 2017–18 Sheffield Shield season in a match against Western Australia at the WACA. He scored twin centuries, a century in each innings of the match; in the first innings, he scored 152 off only 160 balls (to date his highest innings score), and then 143 off 281 balls in the second innings to guide the Redbacks to an unlikely five-wicket victory, after Western Australia had scored 514 in the first innings. This was South Australia's highest successful chase at the WACA, and the first time a South Australian had scored twin centuries in a Shield match since Darren Lehmann eighteen seasons earlier. Weatherald took his first-class batting average from 33 to 40 in this match alone.

In the final for the 2017–18 Big Bash League season, Weatherald played a knock of 115 of 70 balls, against the Hobart Hurricanes, in which the Adelaide Strikers won their first Big Bash title. This was the first century in a Big Bash final. He was involved in what was termed by former England Test captain Michael Vaughan the greatest catch of all time during BBL|07.

=== 2019–2020 ===
Ahead of the 2019–20 Marsh One-Day Cup, Weatherald was named as one of the six cricketers to watch during the tournament.

On 11 November 2019, in the 2019–20 Sheffield Shield season, he and Henry Hunt set a new record for the highest opening partnership for South Australia in first-class cricket, with 293 runs. However, in October 2020, Weatherald took time away from the game citing mental health issues.

=== 2025–present ===
At the end of the 2025–26 season, Weatherald returned to South Australia for the 2026–27 Sheffield Shield season. He also signed an overseas player contract with Leicestershire County Cricket Club in England to play for the club in the opening block of matches in the 2026 County Championship.

== International career ==
Weatherald received his first senior national call-up in November 2025, when he was named in Australia's squad for the opening Test of the home 2025–26 Ashes series against England in Perth. His selection followed a run of strong early-season Sheffield Shield performances. Upon making his Test debut, Weatherald become just the second Northern Territory-born player to represent Australia after Damien Martyn. He scored a second ball duck in the first innings, and 22 off 34 balls in the second innings.

He scored his maiden Test half-century in the first innings of the second Test match in the series, finishing with 72 runs from just 78 balls.
