= List of Melbourne Stars cricketers =

The Melbourne Stars are an Australian cricket club who play in the Big Bash League, the national domestic Twenty20 competition. The club was established in 2011 as an inaugural member of the eight-club league. The Big Bash League consists of a regular season and a finals series of the top four teams. This list includes players who have played at least one match for the Stars in the Big Bash League.

== List of players ==
Players are listed according to the date of their debut for the Stars. All statistics are for Big Bash League and Champions League Twenty20 only.

- The number to the left of player name represents 'cap'. For players who debuted for club in the same match, player caps are ordered by that of the batting order.
- Hover over column headings for key
- Currently contracted players names are in bold

As of the end of the 2021–22 season:

Melbourne Stars players						Batting							Bowling					Fielding		Ref
No.	Name	Nat	First	Last	Mat	Runs	HS	Avg	SR	100	50	6's	Wkt	BB	Ave	ER	5wi	C	St	Ref
1	Rob Quiney	(Australia)	2011/12	2017/18	39	793	97	24.03	133.50	0	4	33	–	–	–	–	–	21	0	Ref
2	Matthew Wade	(Australia)	2011/12	2013/14	16	287	53*	28.70	131.65	0	1	10	–	–	–	–	–	12	2	
3	George Bailey	(Australia)	2011/12	2011/12	8	114	33	19.00	110.67	0	0	1	–	–	–	–	–	4	0	
4	David Hussey	(Australia)	2011/12	2016/17	48	855	52	26.71	129.34	0	3	21	12	2/25	20.00	7.50	0	23	0	
5	Cameron White	(Australia)	2011/12	2014/15	34	615	88	19.83	112.22	0	4	22	2	1/12	23.50	7.83	0	17	0	
6	Adam Voges	(Australia)	2011/12	2011/12	6	79	31	15.80	106.75	0	0	0	–	–	–	–	–	1	0	
7	Luke Wright	(England)	2011/12	2017/18	57	1479	117	29.00	131.23	2	6	42	6	1/7	40.50	8.89	0	22	0	
8	James Faulkner	(Australia)	2011/12	2017/18	45	531	47*	27.94	111.08	0	0	12	44	4/46	23.81	7.61	0	17	0	
9	Clint McKay	(Australia)	2011/12	2014/15	23	41	14*	13.66	120.58	0	0	1	24	3/17	27.29	8.02	0	4	0	
10	Shane Warne	(Australia)	2011/12	2012/13	15	0	0*	-	0.00	0	0	0	11	2/23	31.00	7.25	0	2	0	
11	Jade Dernbach	(England)	2011/12	2011/12	2	-	-	-	-	-	-	-	1	1/44	80.00	10.00	0	0	0	
12	Chris Simpson	(Australia)	2011/12	2011/12	3	8	8*	-	160.00	0	0	0	1	1/25	25.00	8.33	0	0	0	
13	Jackson Bird	(Australia)	2011/12	2014/15	33	26	10	4.33	81.25	0	0	0	35	4/31	23.05	7.04	0	13	0	
14	Brad Hodge	(Australia)	2012/13	2013/14	18	561	88	43.15	139.90	0	6	22	–	–	–	–	–	8	0	
15	Lasith Malinga	(Sri Lanka)	2012/13	2013/14	13	4	2*	4.00	50.00	0	0	0	18	6/7	15.00	5.40	1	0	0	
16	Peter Handscomb	(Australia)	2012/13	2019/20	51	834	103*	27.80	121.22	1	4	20	–	–	–	–	–	32	10	
17	**Glenn Maxwell**	(Australia)	2012/13	2020/21	81	2081	84	33.56	150.25	0	17	93	32	3/26	29.78	7.57	0	56	0	
18	Scott Henry	(Australia)	2012/13	2012/13	1	6	6	6	54.54	0	0	0	–	–	–	–	–	0	0	
19	John Hastings	(Australia)	2012/13	2015/16	38	190	22	12.66	146.15	0	0	13	50	4/29	21.24	7.87	0	11	0	
20	Clive Rose	(Australia)	2012/13	2014/15	4	1	1*	0.50	50.00	0	0	0	1	1/25	121.00	10.08	0	3	0	
21	Dimitri Mascarenhas	(England)	2012/13	2012/13	2	1	1	1.00	50.00	0	0	0	2	2/27	27.00	7.71	0	1	0	
22	Alex Keath	(Australia)	2012/13	2014/15	4	10	6	5.00	90.90	0	0	0	0	0/27	–	27.00	0	0	0	
23	**Marcus Stoinis**	(Australia)	2013/14	2020/21	71	2127	147*	37.98	131.94	1	14	70	36	4/21	20.97	8.48	0	16	0	
24	James Muirhead	(Australia)	2013/14	2013/14	4	6	6	6.00	200.00	0	0	0	2	1/11	34.00	6.18	0	3	0	
25	Scott Boland	(Australia)	2013/14	2018/19	31	34	8*	8.50	103.03	0	0	0	36	4/30	25.94	8.50	0	4	0	
26	Mohammad Hafeez	(Pakistan)	2013/14	2013/14	1	4	4	4.00	66.66	0	0	0	0	0/22	–	7.33	0	1	0	
27	Daniel Worrall	(Australia)	2013/14	2019/20	32	55	16	11.00	119.56	0	0	1	26	4/23	33.26	8.27	0	9	0	
28	Kevin Pietersen	(England)	2014/15	2017/18	33	1110	76	37.00	137.20	0	10	38	0	0/7	–	10.00	0	11	0	
29	Tom Triffitt	(Australia)	2014/15	2015/16	10	91	25*	22.75	133.82	0	0	4	–	–	–	–	–	10	0	
29	Michael Beer	(Australia)	2014/15	2018/19	35	13	7*	–	130.00	0	0	0	22	3/32	38.45	6.96	0	3	0	
30	**Adam Zampa**	(Australia)	2015/16	2020/21	57	108	23	8.30	95.57	0	0	2	72	5/17	20.77	7.12	1	8	0	
31	Ben Hilfenhaus	(Australia)	2015/16	2016/17	17	57	32*	8.14	107.54	0	0	2	22	3/17	20.77	8.16	0	5	0	
32	Evan Gulbis	(Australia)	2015/16	2018/19	28	298	61*	24.83	123.14	0	1	9	8	2/22	36.75	7.53	0	10	0	
33	Sam Harper	(Australia)	2016/17	2016/17	5	10	5	2.50	100.00	0	0	0	–	–	–	–	–	2	1	
34	Liam Bowe	(Australia)	2016/17	2018/19	9	2	2*	2.00	66.66	0	0	0	8	2/30	30.50	9.03	0	1	0	
35	Cameron Gannon	(Australia) (United States)	2016/17	2016/17	1	–	–	–	–	–	–	–	0	0/26	–	13.00	–	0	0	
36	**Seb Gotch**	(Australia)	2016/17	2020/21	36	377	48	16.39	102.44	0	0	9	–	–	–	–	–	18	8	
37	Ben Dunk	(Australia)	2017/18	2020/21	42	621	72*	16.34	115.64	0	3	18	1	1/19	48.00	8.00	0	22	0	
38	**Jackson Coleman**	(Australia)	2017/18	2019/20	10	–	–	–	–	–	–	–	11	3/16	16.54	7.18	0	0	0	
39	Daniel Fallins	(Australia)	2017/18	2017/18	2	–	–	–	–	–	–	–	0	0/19	–	8.80	0	0	0	
40	Travis Dean	(Australia)	2018/19	2018/19	2	18	11	9.00	100.00	0	0	0	–	–	–	–	–	0	0	
41	Dwayne Bravo	(Trinidad and Tobago)	2018/19	2018/19	16	145	33	14.50	122.88	0	0	6	15	3/22	28.26	7.97	0	6	0	
42	Sandeep Lamichhane	(Nepal)	2018/19	2019/20	21	1	1	1.00	33.33	0	0	0	26	3/11	20.38	7.09	0	4	0	
43	**Nick Larkin**	(Australia) (Republic of Ireland)	2018/19	2020/21	33	732	83*	36.60	127.97	0	4	15	–	–	–	–	–	14	0	
44	Jonathan Merlo	(Australia)	2018/19	2019/20	5	24	11	8.00	114.28	0	0	0	0	0/21	–	10.50	–	0	0	
45	Liam Plunkett	(England)	2018/19	2018/19	8	23	11	5.75	92.00	0	0	0	12	4/36	17.58	8.22	0	1	0	
46	**Nic Maddinson**	(Australia)	2018/19	2020/21	34	392	48*	14.00	101.55	0	0	15	7	3/24	17.28	7.11	0	22	0	
47	**Tom O'Connell**	(Australia)	2018/19	2020/21	5	9	9*	–	128.57	0	0	0	1	1/17	51.00	8.50	0	0	0	
48	**Hilton Cartwright**	(Australia)	2019/20	2020/21	23	469	59	33.50	134.77	0	2	21	2	2/34	48.00	15.56	0	12	0	
49	**Clint Hinchliffe**	(Australia)	2019/20	2020/21	15	58	25*	11.60	86.56	0	0	0	10	3/19	22.40	8.61	0	5	0	
50	**Haris Rauf**	(Pakistan)	2019/20	2020/21	13	0	0	0.00	0.00	0	0	0	21	5/27	15.95	7.64	1	2	0	
51	**Nathan Coulter-Nile**	(Australia)	2019/20	2020/21	18	82	20*	10.25	143.85	0	0	4	21	4/10	21.80	7.65	0	5	0	
52	Dale Steyn	(South Africa)	2019/20	2019/20	4	–	–	–	–	–	–	–	5	2/12	16.20	6.23	0	1	0	
53	**Lance Morris**	(Australia)	2019/20	2020/21	7	2	2	2.00	33.33	0	0	0	1	1/30	156.00	12.00	0	1	0	
54	**Dilbar Hussain**	(Pakistan)	2019/20	2020/21	3	7	7*	–	87.50	0	0	0	4	2/25	23.00	9.35	0	0	0	
55	**Andre Fletcher**	(Grenada)	2020/21	2020/21	12	206	89*	20.60	130.37	0	1	9	0	0/8	–	8.00	0	8	0	
56	**Billy Stanlake**	(Australia)	2020/21	2020/21	12	3	2*	3.00	25.00	0	0	0	13	3/25	24.92	8.34	0	1	0	
57	**Liam Hatcher**	(Australia)	2020/21	2020/21	9	16	9	8.00	88.88	0	0	1	13	3/28	23.69	8.88	0	2	0	
58	**Nicholas Pooran**	(Trinidad and Tobago)	2020/21	2020/21	6	127	65	25.40	169.33	0	1	13	–	–	–	–	–	2	1	
59	**Zahir Khan**	(Afghanistan)	2020/21	2020/21	8	2	2*	–	50.00	0	0	0	6	2/19	33.50	6.93	0	0	0	
60	**Sam Rainbird**	(Australia)	2020/21	2020/21	5	21	15	21.00	150.00	0	0	0	5	2/22	29.80	8.27	0	0	0	

== See also ==
- Melbourne Stars
- Big Bash League
