= 2018–19 Melbourne Stars season =

Melbourne Stars
2018–19 season
- Coach: (New Zealand) Stephen Fleming
- Captain(s): (Australia) Glenn Maxwell
- Home ground: Melbourne Cricket Ground, Melbourne
- BBL Season: 4th
- BBL Finals: Runners-up
- Leading Run Scorer: (Australia) Marcus Stoinis (533)
- Leading Wicket Taker: (Trinidad and Tobago) Dwayne Bravo (15)
- Highest home attendance: 46,418 vs Renegades (1 January 2019)
- Lowest home attendance: 6,093 vs Strikers (23 January 2019)
- Average home attendance: 21,541

The 2018–19 Melbourne Stars season is the eighth in the club's history. Coached by Stephen Fleming and captained by Glenn Maxwell, they competed in the BBL's 2018–19 season.

== Season ==
=== Ladder ===
Pos	Team	Pld	W	L	NR	Pts	NRR	Qualification
1	Hobart Hurricanes	14	10	4	0	20	0.603	Advanced to semi-finals
2	Melbourne Renegades (C)	14	8	6	0	16	0.173	Advanced to semi-finals
3	Sydney Sixers	14	8	6	0	16	0.047	Advanced to semi-finals
4	Melbourne Stars	14	7	7	0	14	−0.062	Advanced to semi-finals
5	Brisbane Heat	14	6	7	1	13	0.249	
6	Sydney Thunder	14	6	7	1	13	0.000	
7	Adelaide Strikers	14	6	8	0	12	−0.473	
8	Perth Scorchers	14	4	10	0	8	−0.502	

(C) Champions

=== Regular season ===
21 December 2018
19:15 (D/N)
Scorecard

(H) Sydney Thunder; 5/181 (20 overs)	v	Melbourne Stars; 6/74 (8 overs)
Jason Sangha 63* (36); Adam Zampa 2/23 (4 overs)		Nick Larkin 28* (13); Daniel Sams 3/5 (2 overs)

Sydney Thunder won by 15 runs (D/L method)
Manuka Oval, Canberra
Attendance: 8,788
Umpires: Simon Lightbody and Tony Wilds
Player of the match: Daniel Sams (Sydney Thunder)

- Melbourne Stars won the toss and elected to field.
- Melbourne Stars were set a target of 90 runs from 8 overs due to rain.
- Travis Dean (Melbourne Stars) made his T20 debut.

24 December 2018
15:45
Scorecard

Melbourne Stars; 5/155 (20 overs)	v	Hobart Hurricanes (H); 4/156 (18.4 overs)
Glenn Maxwell 47 (31); Jofra Archer 3/25 (4 overs)		Matthew Wade 52 (37); Sandeep Lamichhane 3/24 (4 overs)

Hobart Hurricanes won by 6 wickets
Blundstone Arena, Hobart
Attendance: 9,132
Umpires: Shawn Craig and Sam Nogajski
Player of the match: D'Arcy Short (Hobart Hurricanes)

- Hobart Hurricanes won the toss and elected to field.

27 December 2018
19:15 (D/N)
Scorecard

(H) Sydney Sixers; 9/130 (20 overs)	v	Melbourne Stars; 5/132 (14.5 overs)
Jordan Silk 41* (37); Jackson Coleman 3/18 (3 overs)		Peter Handscomb 70 (35); Ben Dwarshuis 3/26 (3.5 overs)

Melbourne Stars won by 5 wickets
Sydney Cricket Ground, Sydney
Attendance: 22,221
Umpires: Shawn Craig and Simon Lightbody
Player of the match: Peter Handscomb (Melbourne Stars)

- Melbourne Stars won the toss and elected to field.

1 January 2019
19:15 (D/N)
Scorecard

Melbourne Renegades; 9/148 (20 overs)	v	Melbourne Stars (H); 3/151 (17.5 overs)
Daniel Christian 32 (28); Dwayne Bravo 3/27 (4 overs)		Marcus Stoinis 78* (49); Cameron Boyce 2/23 (4 overs)

Melbourne Stars won by 7 wickets
Melbourne Cricket Ground, Melbourne
Attendance: 46,418
Umpires: Shawn Craig and John Ward
Player of the match: Marcus Stoinis (Melbourne Stars)

- Melbourne Stars won the toss and elected to field.
- Jonathan Merlo (Melbourne Stars) made his T20 debut.

5 January 2019
17:15 (D/N)
Scorecard

Sydney Thunder; 8/135 (20 overs)	v	Melbourne Stars (H); 2/137 (17.2 overs)
Daniel Sams 42 (25); Scott Boland 2/28 (4 overs)		Glenn Maxwell 41* (31); Fawad Ahmed 1/26 (4 overs)

Melbourne Stars won by 8 wickets
Metricon Stadium, Gold Coast
Attendance: 8,156
Umpires: Greg Davidson and Geoff Joshua
Player of the match: Marcus Stoinis (Melbourne Stars)

- Sydney Thunder won the toss and elected to bat.

9 January 2019
19:15 (D/N)
Scorecard

(H) Melbourne Stars; 6/146 (20 overs)	v	Perth Scorchers; 4/147 (17.4 overs)
Ben Dunk 62 (47); Andrew Tye 4/18 (4 overs)		Cameron Bancroft 59 (42); Dwayne Bravo 2/18 (3 overs)

Perth Scorchers won by 6 wickets
Melbourne Cricket Ground, Melbourne
Attendance: 25,342
Umpires: Simon Fry and Sam Nogajski
Player of the match: Andrew Tye (Perth Scorchers)

- Perth Scorchers won the toss and elected to field.
- Aaron Hardie (Perth Scorchers) made his T20 debut.

11 January 2019
18:30 (D/N)
Scorecard

(H) Adelaide Strikers; 5/178 (20 overs)	v	Melbourne Stars; 137 (19.2 overs)
Colin Ingram 57 (41); Liam Plunkett 4/36 (4 overs)		Evan Gulbis 37 (25); Ben Laughlin 3/19 (3.2 overs)

Adelaide Strikers won by 41 runs
Adelaide Oval, Adelaide
Attendance: 30,392
Umpires: John Ward and Tony Wilds
Player of the match: Colin Ingram (Adelaide Strikers)

- Melbourne Stars won the toss and elected to field.

14 January 2019
19:15 (D/N)
Scorecard

Hobart Hurricanes; 2/185 (20 overs)	v	Melbourne Stars (H); 126 (17.1 overs)
D'Arcy Short 96* (57); Tom O'Connell 1/17 (2 overs)		Seb Gotch 35 (26); Riley Meredith 4/21 (4 overs)

Hobart Hurricanes won by 59 runs
Melbourne Cricket Ground, Melbourne
Attendance: 20,188
Umpires: Michael Graham-Smith and John Ward
Player of the match: D'Arcy Short (Hobart Hurricanes)

- Melbourne Stars won the toss and elected to field.
- Tom O'Connell (Melbourne Stars) made his T20 debut.

19 January 2019
18:45 (D/N)
Scorecard

(H) Melbourne Renegades; 121 (19.3 overs)	v	Melbourne Stars; 4/124 (19.2 overs)
Mohammad Nabi 28 (33); Marcus Stoinis 3/19 (4 overs)		Marcus Stoinis 70* (65); Kane Richardson 2/17 (4 overs)

Melbourne Stars won by 6 wickets
Marvel Stadium, Melbourne
Attendance: 38,117
Umpires: Phillip Gillespie and Geoff Joshua
Player of the match: Marcus Stoinis (Melbourne Stars)

- Melbourne Stars won the toss and elected to field.

23 January 2019
14:45
Scorecard

(H) Melbourne Stars; 2/167 (20 overs)	v	Adelaide Strikers; 123 (19.4 overs)
Ben Dunk 72* (53); Rashid Khan 1/32 (4 overs)		Jake Lehmann 40 (32); Marcus Stoinis 3/20 (4 overs)

Melbourne Stars won by 44 runs
Ted Summerton Reserve, Moe
Attendance: 6,093
Umpires: Phillip Gillespie and Michael Graham-Smith
Player of the match: Ben Dunk (Melbourne Stars)

- Adelaide Strikers won the toss and elected to field.

27 January 2019
19:40 (D/N)
Scorecard

(H) Melbourne Stars; 134/8 (20 overs)	v	Brisbane Heat; 129/8 (20 overs)
Marcus Stoinis 43 (29); Ben Cutting 2/10 (2 overs)		Matt Renshaw 45 (43); Marcus Stoinis 4/21 (4 overs)

Melbourne Stars won by 5 runs
Melbourne Cricket Ground, Melbourne
Attendance: 22,231
Umpires: Simon Fry and Geoff Joshua
Player of the match: Marcus Stoinis (Melbourne Stars)

- Brisbane Heat won the toss and elected to field.

3 February 2019
18:15 (D/N)
Scorecard

(H) Perth Scorchers; 3/182 (20 overs)	v	Melbourne Stars; 9/155 (20 overs)
Ashton Turner 69 (42); Liam Plunkett 1/23 (3 overs)		Glenn Maxwell 61 (40); Nathan Coulter-Nile 3/30 (4 overs)

Perth Scorchers won by 27 runs
Optus Stadium, Perth
Attendance: 16,660
Umpires: Gerard Abood and Nathan Johnstone
Player of the match: Ashton Turner (Perth Scorchers)

- Melbourne Stars won the toss and elected to field.
- Michael Klinger (Perth Scorchers) regained his record of the leading run-scorer in the Big Bash League with 1,947 runs. Chris Lynn of the Brisbane Heat had over taken Klinger two nights prior.

8 February 2019
19:40 (D/N)
Scorecard

Melbourne Stars; 8/156 (20 overs)	v	Brisbane Heat (H); 0/158 (10 overs)
Marcus Stoinis 81 (51); Josh Lalor 3/43 (4 overs)		Ben Cutting 81* (30)

Brisbane Heat won by 10 wickets
The Gabba, Brisbane
Attendance: 21,391
Umpires: Greg Davidson and Tony Wilds
Player of the match: Ben Cutting (Brisbane Heat)

- Brisbane Heat won the toss and elected to field.

10 February 2019
14:45
Scorecard

(H) Melbourne Stars; 6/168 (20 overs)	v	Sydney Sixers; 74 (13.4 overs)
Glenn Maxwell 82 (43); Tom Curran 2/39 (4 overs)		Daniel Hughes 12 (9); Sandeep Lamichhane 3/11 (3.4 overs)

Melbourne Stars won by 94 runs
Melbourne Cricket Ground, Melbourne
Attendance: 22,359
Umpires: Gerard Abood and Sam Nogajski
Player of the match: Glenn Maxwell (Melbourne Stars)

- Sydney Sixers won the toss and elected to field.

=== Knockout stages ===
==== Semi-finals ====
14 February 2019
19:40 (D/N)
Scorecard

(H) Hobart Hurricanes; 7/153 (20 overs)	v	Melbourne Stars; 4/157 (18.5 overs)
Ben McDermott 53 (42); Daniel Worrall 4/23 (4 overs)		Glenn Maxwell 43* (33); Qais Ahmad 3/33 (4 overs)

Melbourne Stars won by 6 wickets
Blundstone Arena, Hobart
Attendance: 12,404
Umpires: Shawn Craig and Sam Nogajski
Player of the match: Daniel Worrall (Melbourne Stars)

- Melbourne Stars won the toss and elected to field.

==== Final ====
17 February 2019
14:45
Scorecard

(H) Melbourne Renegades; 5/145 (20 overs)	v	Melbourne Stars; 7/132 (20 overs)
Tom Cooper 43* (35); Adam Zampa 2/21 (4 overs)		Ben Dunk 57 (45); Chris Tremain 2/21 (4 overs)

Melbourne Renegades won by 13 runs
Marvel Stadium, Melbourne
Attendance: 40,816
Umpires: Gerard Abood and Sam Nogajski
Player of the match: Dan Christian (Melbourne Renegades)

- Melbourne Stars won the toss and elected to field.

== Players ==
=== Squad ===
The following is the Stars men's squad for the 2018–19 Big Bash League season as of 23 January 2019.

S/N	Name	Nat.	Date of birth	Batting style	Bowling style	Notes
Batsmen
28	Travis Dean	(Australia)	1 February 1992 (age 34)	Right-handed	—	
36	Nick Larkin	(Australia) (Republic of Ireland)	1 May 1990 (age 36)	Right-handed	—	
53	Nic Maddinson	(Australia)	21 December 1991 (age 34)	Right-handed	Slow left arm	Vice-Captain, International Cap
All Rounders
4	Evan Gulbis	(Australia)	26 March 1986 (age 40)	Right-handed	Right arm fast medium	
12	Jonathan Merlo	(Australia)	15 December 1998 (age 27)	Right-handed	Right arm fast medium	
16	Marcus Stoinis	(Australia)	16 August 1989 (age 37)	Right-handed	Right arm medium	International Cap
32	Glenn Maxwell	(Australia)	14 October 1988 (age 38)	Right-handed	Right arm off spin	Captain, International Cap
47	Dwayne Bravo	(Trinidad and Tobago)	7 October 1983 (age 43)	Right-handed	Right arm fast medium	International Cap, Visa contract
Wicketkeepers
13	Seb Gotch	(Australia)	12 July 1993 (age 33)	Right-handed	—	
51	Ben Dunk	(Australia)	11 March 1987 (age 39)	Left-handed	—	International Cap
54	Peter Handscomb	(Australia)	26 April 1991 (age 35)	Right-handed	—	International Cap
Pace Bowlers
9	Jackson Coleman	(Australia)	18 December 1991 (age 34)	Right-handed	Left arm fast medium	
17	Daniel Worrall	(Australia)	10 July 1991 (age 35)	Right-handed	Right arm fast medium	International Cap
22	Jackson Bird	(Australia)	11 December 1986 (age 39)	Right-handed	Right arm fast medium	International Cap
25	Scott Boland	(Australia)	11 April 1989 (age 37)	Right-handed	Right arm fast medium	International Cap
33	Liam Plunkett	(England)	6 April 1985 (age 41)	Right-handed	Right arm fast	International Cap, Visa Contract
Spin Bowlers
1	Sandeep Lamichhane	(Nepal)	2 August 2000 (age 26)	Right-handed	Right arm leg break	International Cap, Visa contract
6	Tom O'Connell	(Australia)	14 June 2000 (age 26)	Left-handed	Right-arm leg spin	
19	Michael Beer	(Australia)	9 June 1984 (age 42)	Right-handed	Left arm orthodox	International Cap
23	Liam Bowe	(Australia)	23 September 1997 (age 29)	Right-handed	Slow left-arm wrist-spin	
28	Matt Parkinson	(England)	24 October 1996 (age 29)	Right-handed	Right-arm leg break	Visa Contract
63	Adam Zampa	(Australia)	31 March 1992 (age 34)	Right-handed	Right arm leg break	International Cap

=== Personnel Changes ===
==== Incoming Players ====
Entry date	Role	No.	Player	From team	Notes	Ref.
27 February 2018	Batsman	53	(Australia) Nic Maddinson	(Australia) Sydney Sixers	International Cap	
18 July 2018	Batsman	28	(Australia) Travis Dean	(Australia) Melbourne Renegades		
23 October 2018	Spin Bowler	1	(Nepal) Sandeep Lamichhane	(Nepal) International Player	Visa Contract and International Cap	
23 October 2018	Spin Bowler	28	(England) Matt Parkinson	(England) International Player	Visa Contract	
13 November 2018	All-rounder	12	(Australia) Jonathan Merlo	(Australia) Free Agent		
15 November 2018	All-rounder	47	(Trinidad and Tobago) Dwayne Bravo	(Australia) Melbourne Renegades	Visa Contract and International Cap	
21 November 2018	Pace Bowler	22	(Australia) Jackson Bird	(Australia) Sydney Sixers	International Cap	
6 December 2018	Pace Bowler	33	(England) Liam Plunkett	(England) International Player	Visa Contract and International Cap	
21 December 2018	Batsman	36	(Australia) Nick Larkin	(Australia) Free Agent		
14 January 2019	Spin Bowler	6	(Australia) Tom O'Connell	(Australia) Free Agent		

==== Outgoing Players ====
Exit date	Role	No.	Player	To team	Notes	Ref.
27 January 2018	Batsman	21	(Australia) Robert Quiney	Retired	International Cap	
1 March 2018	All-rounder	6	(England) Luke Wright	Released	Visa Contract and International Cap	
1 March 2020	Pace Bowler	20	(Australia) Ben Hilfenhaus	Released	International Cap	
15 March 2018	Batsman	24	(England) Kevin Pietersen	Retired	Visa Contract and International Cap	
15 May 2018	All-rounder	5	(Australia) James Faulkner	(Australia) Hobart Hurricanes	International Cap	
28 May 2018	All-rounder	11	(Australia) John Hastings	(Australia) Sydney Sixers	International Cap	
31 October 2018	Spin Bowler	28	(England) Matt Parkinson	Withdrew	Visa Contract	
9 November 2018	Spin Bowler	21	(Australia) Daniel Fallins	(Australia) Sydney Sixers		
21 December 2018	Wicket-keeper	2	(Australia) Sam Harper	(Australia) Melbourne Renegades		

== Season statistics ==
=== Home attendance ===
Match	Opponent	Attendance
3	Melbourne Renegades	46,418
4	Sydney Thunder	8,156
5	Perth Scorchers	25,342
8	Hobart Hurricanes	20,188
10	Adelaide Strikers	6,093
11	Brisbane Heat	22,231
14	Sydney Sixers	22,359
Total Attendance		150,787
Average Attendance		21,541

=== Batting ===
==== Most runs ====
Batsman	Matches	Innings	Runs	BF	Average	SR
(Australia) Marcus Stoinis	13	13	533	408	53.30	130.63
(Australia) Ben Dunk	16	16	342	289	22.80	118.33
(Australia) Glenn Maxwell	13	12	331	233	33.10	142.06
(Australia) Peter Handscomb	9	9	193	150	21.44	128.66
(Australia) Nick Larkin	8	8	159	137	31.80	116.05

Full Table on Cricinfo

Last updated: 17 February 2019

==== Highest scores ====
Batsman	Score	Opp
(Australia) Glenn Maxwell	82	Sixers
(Australia) Marcus Stoinis	81	Heat
(Australia) Marcus Stoinis	78*	Renegades
(Australia) Ben Dunk	72*	Strikers
(Australia) Marcus Stoinis	70*	Renegades

Full Table on Cricinfo

Last updated: 17 February 2019

==== Best strike rates ====
Batsman	Mat	SR
(Australia) Glenn Maxwell	1	142.06
(Australia) Evan Gulbis	12	130.98
(Australia) Marcus Stoinis	17	130.63
(Australia) Peter Handscomb	14	128.66
(Australia) Tom O'Connell	17	128.57

Full Table on Cricinfo

Last updated: 17 February 2019

==== Most sixes ====
Batsman	6's
(Australia) Glenn Maxwell	17
(Australia) Marcus Stoinis	11
(Australia) Ben Dunk	8
(Australia) Peter Handscomb	6
(Trinidad and Tobago) Dwayne Bravo	6

Full Table on Cricinfo

Last updated: 17 February 2019
