= 2015–16 Matador BBQs One-Day Cup =

2015 Matador BBQs One-Day Cup
- Dates: 5 October 2015 – 25 October 2015
- Administrator: Cricket Australia
- Cricket format: List A
- Tournament format: Round-robin tournament
- Host: Sydney
- Champions: New South Wales (10th title)
- Participants: 7
- Matches: 23
- Player of the series: Mitchell Starc (NSW)
- Most runs: Steve Smith (NSW) (435 runs)
- Most wickets: Mitchell Starc (NSW) (26 wickets)

The 2015–16 Matador BBQs One-Day Cup was the 46th season of the official List A domestic cricket competition in Australia. It was played over a four-week period at the start of the domestic season to separate its schedule before the Sheffield Shield. The tournament was held in Sydney, with most matches broadcast live on free-to-air television on GEM. In the final, New South Wales, who won every round robin game except for one against Victoria, was successful over South Australia, who qualified for the final through a victory in an elimination final against Victoria.

== Points table ==
Pos	Team	Pld	W	L	T	NR	BP	Pts	NRR
1	New South Wales	6	5	1	0	0	6	26	2.249
2	Victoria	6	4	2	0	0	2	18	0.827
3	South Australia	6	4	2	0	0	1	17	−0.431
4	Tasmania	6	3	3	0	0	2	14	0.381
5	Western Australia	6	2	4	0	0	2	10	0.463
6	Queensland	6	2	4	0	0	0	8	−0.676
7	Cricket Australia XI	6	1	5	0	0	0	4	−2.896

RESULT POINTS:

- Win – 4
- Tie – 2 each
- No Result – 2 each
- Loss – 0
- Bonus Point – 1 (Run rate 1.25 times that of opposition.)
- Additional Bonus Point – 1 (Run rate twice that of opposition.)

== Fixtures ==
5 October
10:00
Scorecard

Queensland; 196 (48.3 overs)	v	Tasmania; 200/1 (36 overs)
Simon Milenko 40 (69); Andrew Fekete 4/30 (9.3 overs)		Ben Dunk 104* (101); Cameron Boyce 1/30 (5 overs)

Tasmania won by 9 wickets
North Sydney Oval, Sydney
Umpires: Gerard Abood (Aus) and Shawn Craig (Aus)
Player of the match: Ben Dunk (Tas)

- Tasmania won the toss and elected to field.
- Marnus Labuschagne and Billy Stanlake (Qld) and Jake Doran (Tas) all made their List A debuts.

5 October
10:00
Scorecard

New South Wales; 338/3 (50 overs)	v	Cricket Australia XI; 59 (24.4 overs)
Steve Smith 143* (122); James Bazley 1/49 (7 overs)		Alex Gregory 23* (48); Mitchell Starc 6/25 (8.4 overs)

New South Wales won by 279 runs
Bankstown Oval, Sydney
Umpires: Sam Nogajski (Aus) and Tony Wilds (Aus)
Player of the match: Mitchell Starc (NSW)

- New South Wales won the toss and elected to bat.
- James Bazley, Seb Gotch, Liam Hatcher, Mitchell Swepson and Jack Wildermuth (all Cricket Australia XI) made their List A debuts.

5 October
10:00
Scorecard

Western Australia; 350/4 (50 overs)	v	South Australia; 354/4 (46.3 overs)
Cameron Bancroft 176 (155); Tom Andrews 2/66 (9 overs)		Travis Head 202 (120); Joel Paris 3/63 (9 overs)

South Australia won by 6 wickets
Hurstville Oval, Sydney
Umpires: Phillip Gillespie (Aus) and Michael Graham-Smith (Aus)
Player of the match: Travis Head (SA)

- South Australia won the toss and elected to field.
- Sam Raphael (SA) made his List A debut.

7 October
10:00
Scorecard

Cricket Australia XI; 79 (28 overs)	v	Victoria; 81/1 (11.1 overs)
William Bosisto 21 (46); James Pattinson 4/18 (10 overs)		Aaron Finch 45* (30); Matt Dixon 1/33 (6 overs)

Victoria won by 9 wickets
Hurstville Oval, Sydney
Umpires: Shawn Craig (Aus) and Phillip Gillespie (Aus)
Player of the match: James Pattinson (Vic)

- Cricket Australia XI won the toss and elected to bat.
- Ryan Lees (Cricket Australia XI) made his List A debut.

8 October
10:00
Scorecard

New South Wales; 266/9 (50 overs)	v	South Australia; 110 (31.3 overs)
Steve Smith 72 (83); Gary Putland 2/54 (10 overs)		Tom Cooper 28 (47); Mitchell Starc 4/27 (8.3 overs)

New South Wales won by 156 runs
North Sydney Oval, Sydney
Umpires: Greg Davidson (Aus) and Michael Graham-Smith (Aus)
Player of the match: Mitchell Starc (NSW)

- South Australia won the toss and elected to field.

9 October
14:00
Scorecard

Queensland; 209 (50 overs)	v	Victoria; 180 (41 overs)
Peter Forrest 57 (71); James Pattinson 4/53 (10 overs)		Matthew Wade 56 (45); James Hopes 2/31 (10 overs)

Queensland won by 29 runs
Blacktown Olympic Park Oval, Sydney
Umpires: Gerard Abood (Aus) and Phillip Gillespie (Aus)
Player of the match: James Pattinson (Vic)

- Victoria won the toss and elected to field.
- Charlie Hemphrey (Qld) made his List A debut.

10 October
10:00
Scorecard

Cricket Australia XI; 241/7 (50 overs)	v	Tasmania; 238/9 (50 overs)
Marcus Harris 84 (94); James Faulkner 3/40 (10 overs)		Tim Paine 56 (94); Matt Dixon 3/40 (10 overs)

Cricket Australia XI won by 3 runs
Bankstown Oval, Sydney
Umpires: Greg Davidson (Aus) and Michael Graham-Smith (Aus)
Player of the match: Marcus Harris (Cricket Australia XI)

- Cricket Australia XI won the toss and elected to bat.
- Riley Ayre (Cricket Australia XI) made his List A debut.

10 October
14:00
Scorecard

New South Wales; 264/5 (50 overs)	v	Western Australia; 189 (44.4 overs)
Ed Cowan 100 (139); Mitchell Marsh 3/36 (8 overs)		Michael Klinger 51 (77); Mitchell Starc 4/23 (9.4 overs)

New South Wales won by 75 runs
Blacktown Olympic Park Oval, Sydney
Umpires: Shawn Craig (Aus) and Sam Nogajski (Aus)
Player of the match: Ed Cowan (NSW)

- New South Wales won the toss and elected to bat.

11 October
10:00
Scorecard

Queensland; 279/9 (50 overs)	v	South Australia; 278/9 (48.5 overs)
Nathan Reardon 87 (97); Kane Richardson 5/35 (10 overs)		Alex Ross 88* (87); Billy Stanlake 3/43 (9 overs)

South Australia won by 1 wicket (D/L method)
Bankstown Oval, Sydney
Umpires: Tony Wilds (Aus) and Paul Wilson (Aus)
Player of the match: Kane Richardson (SA)

- South Australia won the toss and elected to field.

12 October
10:00
Scorecard

Victoria; 225/8 (50 overs)	v	Western Australia; 189 (47.2 overs)
Daniel Christian 60 (66); Mitchell Marsh 2/33 (8 overs); Ashton Agar 2/33 (8 overs)		Cameron Bancroft 64 (100); Glenn Maxwell 3/30 (5 overs)

Victoria won by 36 runs
Blacktown Olympic Park Oval, Sydney
Umpires: Gerard Abood (Aus) and Geoff Joshua (Aus)
Player of the match: Glenn Maxwell (Vic)

- Victoria won the toss and elected to bat.

12 October
10:00
Scorecard

Tasmania; 217 (46.3 overs)	v	New South Wales; 193/2 (38.5 overs)
James Faulkner 51 (57); Mitchell Starc 5/39 (8.3 overs)		Nic Maddinson 118 (118); Xavier Doherty 2/38 (9 overs)

New South Wales won by 8 wickets (D/L method)
Hurstville Oval, Sydney
Umpires: Shawn Craig (Aus) and John Ward (Aus)
Player of the match: Nic Maddinson (NSW)

- New South Wales won the toss and elected to field.

14 October
10:00
Scorecard

Tasmania; 234/4 (50 overs)	v	South Australia; 141 (40.4 overs)
Tim Paine 109* (141); Adam Zampa 1/37 (10 overs)		Travis Head 39 (52); Evan Gulbis 4/12 (6.4 overs)

Tasmania won by 93 runs
Blacktown Olympic Park Oval, Sydney
Umpires: Geoff Joshua (Aus) and Mick Martell (Aus)
Player of the match: Tim Paine (Tas)

- Tasmania won the toss and elected to bat.

15 October
10:00
Scorecard

Western Australia; 347/5 (50 overs)	v	Cricket Australia XI; 101 (27.3 overs)
Shaun Marsh 186 (148); Liam Hatcher 3/76 (10 overs)		Marcus Harris 44 (64); Andrew Tye 4/35 (8 overs)

Western Australia won by 246 runs
North Sydney Oval, Sydney
Umpires: Ashley Barrow (Aus) and Greg Davidson (Aus)
Player of the match: Shaun Marsh (WA)

- Western Australia won the toss and elected to bat.

16 October
14:00
Scorecard

New South Wales; 304/6 (50 overs)	v	Queensland; 158 (39.1 overs)
Steve Smith 136* (142); Ben Cutting 4/50 (10 overs)		Joe Burns 77 (99); Nathan Lyon 4/31 (6.1 overs)

New South Wales won by 146 runs
Drummoyne Oval, Sydney
Umpires: Gerard Abood (Aus) and Paul Wilson (Aus)
Player of the match: Steve Smith (NSW)

- New South Wales won the toss and elected to bat.

16 October
10:00
Scorecard

South Australia; 198 (49.2 overs)	v	Victoria; 181 (47.4 overs)
Jake Lehmann 58 (89); Marcus Stoinis 4/43 (8.2 overs)		John Hastings 43 (42); Kane Richardson 3/23 (9.4 overs)

South Australia won by 17 runs
Bankstown Oval, Sydney
Umpires: Mick Martell (Aus) and John Ward (Aus)
Player of the match: Jake Lehmann (SA)

- South Australia won the toss and elected to bat.

17 October
14:00
Scorecard

Tasmania; 222/9 (50 overs)	v	Western Australia; 207/8 (50 overs)
Dom Michael 100 (134); Joel Paris 3/24 (7 overs)		Shaun Marsh 68 (107); James Faulkner 3/35 (10 overs)

Tasmania won by 15 runs
Drummoyne Oval, Sydney
Umpires: Ashley Barrow (Aus) and Mick Martell (Aus)
Player of the match: Dom Michael (Tas)

- Tasmania won the toss and elected to bat.

18 October
10:00
Scorecard

Victoria; 244 (46.5 overs)	v	New South Wales; 223 (48.2 overs)
Rob Quiney 79 (75); Mitchell Starc 4/58 (9.5 overs)		Shane Watson 64 (91); John Hastings 4/30 (10 overs)

Victoria won by 21 runs
North Sydney Oval, Sydney
Umpires: Greg Davidson (Aus) and Paul Wilson (Aus)
Player of the match: John Hastings (Vic)

- New South Wales won the toss and elected to field.

19 October
10:00
Scorecard

Queensland; 282/7 (50 overs)	v	Cricket Australia XI; 248 (47.4 overs)
Nathan Reardon 101 (83); Matthew Short 2/67 (10 overs)		Hilton Cartwright 99 (96); Mark Steketee 4/41 (8.4 overs)

Queensland won by 34 runs
Drummoyne Oval, Sydney
Umpires: Geoff Joshua (Aus) and Sam Nogajski (Aus)
Player of the match: Hilton Cartwright (Cricket Australia XI)

- Queensland won the toss and elected to bat.

20 October
10:00
Scorecard

Victoria; 320/6 (50 overs)	v	Tasmania; 230/7 (43.1 overs)
Marcus Stoinis 109 (112); James Faulkner 3/71 (10 overs)		Ben Dunk 54 (58); James Pattinson 3/35 (8.1 overs)

Victoria won by 48 runs (D/L method)
North Sydney Oval, Sydney
Umpires: Ashley Barrow (Aus) and Paul Wilson (Aus)
Player of the match: Marcus Stoinis (Vic)

- Victoria won the toss and elected to bat.

21 October
10:00
Scorecard

South Australia; 244/5 (49 overs)	v	Cricket Australia XI; 168 (42.1 overs)
Tom Cooper 83 (83); Mitchell Swepson 2/43 (10 overs)		Hilton Cartwright 66 (76); Tom Andrews 4/41 (10 overs)

South Australia won by 79 runs
Bankstown Oval, Sydney
Umpires: Geoff Joshua (Aus) and Mick Martell (Aus)
Player of the match: Tom Cooper (SA)

- South Australia won the toss and elected to bat.

21 October
10:00
Scorecard

Western Australia; 240/9 (50 overs)	v	Queensland; 201 (47 overs)
Adam Voges 81 (106); Billy Stanlake 4/37 (10 overs)		Nathan Reardon 54 (67); Mitchell Johnson 5/31 (9 overs)

Western Australia won by 39 runs
Drummoyne Oval, Sydney
Umpires: Sam Nogajski (Aus) and John Ward (Aus)
Player of the match: Adam Voges (WA)

- Western Australia won the toss and elected to bat.
- Jhye Richardson (WA) made his List A debut.

== Finals ==
=== Elimination Final ===
Elimination Final
23 October
14:00 (D/N)
Scorecard

South Australia; 250/7 (50 overs)	v	Victoria; 194 (46.4 overs)
Alex Ross 97 (104); Jon Holland 3/49 (9 overs)		Rob Quiney 71 (99); Kane Richardson 3/26 (8 overs)

South Australia won by 56 runs
Drummoyne Oval, Sydney
Umpires: Mick Martell (Aus) and John Ward (Aus)

- South Australia won the toss and elected to bat.

=== Final ===
Final
25 October
10:00
Scorecard

South Australia; 221 (46.3 overs)	v	New South Wales; 223/1 (29.5 overs)
Tom Cooper 105 (119); Josh Hazlewood 3/28 (9.3 overs)		Ed Cowan 88 (78); Kane Richardson 1/58 (7 overs)

New South Wales won by 9 wickets
North Sydney Oval, Sydney
Umpires: Mick Martell and John Ward
Player of the match: Josh Hazlewood (NSW)

- New South Wales won the toss and elected to field.
