= English cricket team in Australia in 2017–18 =

International cricket tour

	Australia	England
- Dates: 23 November 2017 – 21 February 2018
Captains	Steve Smith	Joe Root (Tests); Eoin Morgan (ODIs)

Test series
- Result: Australia won the 5-match series 4–0
Most runs	Steve Smith (687)	Dawid Malan (383)
Most wickets	Pat Cummins (23)	James Anderson (17)
- Player of the series: Steve Smith (Aus)

One Day International series
- Results: England won the 5-match series 4–1
Most runs	Aaron Finch (275)	Jason Roy (250)
Most wickets	Andrew Tye (8)	Adil Rashid (10)
- Player of the series: Joe Root (Eng)

The England cricket team toured Australia between November 2017 and February 2018 to play five Tests and five One Day Internationals (ODIs). They also played in a three nation Twenty20 International (T20I) tournament, along with New Zealand, who co-hosted the tournament along with Australia. England additionally played two first-class matches, a two-day tour match and a one-day tour match against Cricket Australia XI, as well as a Twenty20 against the Prime Minister's XI. The Test matches made up the 2017–18 Ashes series, with Australia regaining the Ashes by winning the series 4–0. England won the ODI series 4–1. This was England's first bilateral ODI series win in Australia.

In May 2017, it was confirmed that the WACA Ground would host the Test in Perth, as the planned new Perth Stadium would not be opened in time. However, the fifth ODI was played at the new stadium.

ODI series logo

== Squads ==
Tests		ODIs	
Australia	England	Australia	England
Steve Smith (c); David Warner (vc); Ashton Agar; Cameron Bancroft; Jackson Bird; Pat Cummins; Peter Handscomb; Josh Hazlewood; Usman Khawaja; Nathan Lyon; Mitchell Marsh; Shaun Marsh; Glenn Maxwell; Tim Paine (wk); ~~Chadd Sayers~~; Mitchell Starc	Joe Root (c); James Anderson (vc); Moeen Ali; Jonny Bairstow (wk); Jake Ball; Gary Ballance; Stuart Broad; Alastair Cook; Mason Crane; Tom Curran; ~~Steven Finn~~; Ben Foakes (wk); ~~George Garton~~; Dawid Malan; Craig Overton; ~~Ben Stokes~~; Mark Stoneman; Chris Woakes; James Vince	Steve Smith (c); David Warner (vc); Alex Carey (wk); Pat Cummins; Aaron Finch; Josh Hazlewood; Travis Head; ~~Chris Lynn~~; Mitchell Marsh; Glenn Maxwell; Tim Paine (wk); Jhye Richardson; Mitchell Starc; Marcus Stoinis; Andrew Tye; Cameron White; Adam Zampa	Eoin Morgan (c); Moeen Ali; Jonny Bairstow; Jake Ball; Sam Billings; Jos Buttler (wk); Tom Curran; Alex Hales; Dawid Malan; Liam Plunkett; Adil Rashid; Joe Root; Jason Roy; ~~Ben Stokes~~; David Willey; Chris Woakes; Mark Wood

In September 2017, Ben Stokes was named in the initial England squad, but was subsequently ruled out of international selection pending a disciplinary process. The following month, he was replaced by Steven Finn. However, Finn was then himself ruled out of the tour, injuring his knee before the first warm-up game. Tom Curran was called up to replace him. James Anderson was named as England's vice-captain for the Test series in Stokes' absence. George Garton was added to England's squad as cover for Jake Ball during the warm-up games, but returned to the England Lions when Ball recovered in time for the first Test. Additionally, England played a warm-up game during the tour which featured six players not included in the Test squad (Ben Duckett, Keaton Jennings, Daniel Lawrence, Jack Leach, Liam Livingstone, and Mark Wood), although Joe Clarke replaced Duckett himself after an off-field incident with James Anderson.

Australia delayed the naming of its squad for the first two Tests until 17 November 2017, and selected Cameron Bancroft to replace Matthew Renshaw. Tim Paine returned to the team after a seven-year absence, ahead of Matthew Wade and Peter Nevill. Ahead of the first Test, Glenn Maxwell was added to Australia's squad as a cover for David Warner, who injured his neck at training. Mitchell Marsh was added to Australia's squad ahead of the third Test, replacing Chadd Sayers.

Australia's Mitchell Starc and England's Craig Overton were ruled out of the fourth Test due to heel and rib injuries respectively. Despite already having lost the Ashes, England opted not to make wholesale changes to their team, announcing prior to the start of the fourth Test match, that Surrey's Tom Curran would make his debut as a replacement for Overton. Ahead of the fifth Test, Ashton Agar was added to Australia's squad. England's Chris Woakes was ruled out of the fifth Test due to injury.

Prior to the ODI series, Dawid Malan was added to England's squad, replacing Ben Stokes. Cameron White was called up to replace Chris Lynn in Australia’s ODI squad after Lynn was ruled out with an injury. Australia's Josh Hazlewood was ruled out of the second ODI due to virus. Alex Carey was added to Australia's ODI squad as cover for Tim Paine. Glenn Maxwell was added to Australia's ODI squad as a cover for Aaron Finch before the fourth ODI. England's Liam Plunkett was ruled out of last two ODIs due to injury.

== Tour matches ==
=== Western Australia XI vs England ===
4–5 November 2017
Scorecard

England	v	Western Australia
6/349d (91 overs); Mark Stoneman 85 (113); Aaron Hardie 2/46 (11 overs)		10/342 (86 overs); Josh Philippe 88 (92); James Anderson 4/27 (13 overs)

Match drawn
WACA Ground, Perth
Umpires: Gerard Abood (Aus) and Sam Nogajski (Aus)

- England won the toss and elected to bat.
- Up to 15 players per side (12 batting, 11 fielding).

=== Cricket Australia XI vs England ===
8–11 November 2017 (D/N)
Scorecard

England	v	Cricket Australia XI
293 (95 overs); Dawid Malan 63 (128); Daniel Fallins 5/73 (22 overs)		9/233d (76 overs); Tim Paine 52 (98); Mason Crane 3/78 (21 overs)
203 (67.4 overs); Jonny Bairstow 61* (66); Simon Milenko 5/34 (16.4 overs)		75 (40.1 overs); Matthew Short 28 (55); Chris Woakes 4/17 (10 overs)

England won by 192 runs
Adelaide Oval, Adelaide
Umpires: Simon Fry (Aus) and David Shepard (Aus)

- Cricket Australia XI won the toss and elected to field.
- Jackson Coleman, Daniel Fallins and Jason Sangha (Cricket Australia XI) all made their first-class debuts.
- Daniel Fallins took his first five-wicket haul in first-class cricket.
- Jake Ball (Eng) did not bat in the second innings due to injury.

=== Cricket Australia XI vs England ===
15–18 November 2017
Scorecard

Cricket Australia XI	v	England
250 (91.3 overs); Matthew Short 51 (122); Chris Woakes 6/55 (19 overs)		515 (142.5 overs); Mark Stoneman 111 (159); Matthew Short 4/103 (32 overs)
4/364 (110 overs); Matthew Short 134* (264); Moeen Ali 2/88 (32 overs)

Match drawn
Tony Ireland Stadium, Townsville
Umpires: Nathan Johnstone (Aus) and Paul Wilson (Aus)

- Cricket Australia XI won the toss and elected to bat.
- Harry Nielsen (Cricket Australia XI) made his first-class debut.
- Jason Sangha and Matthew Short (Cricket Australia XI) both made their maiden first-class centuries, with Sangha becoming the second-youngest batsman to score a first-class century against England.

=== Cricket Australia XI vs England ===
9–10 December 2017
Scorecard

England	v	Cricket Australia XI
9/314d (69.2 overs); Keaton Jennings 80 (116); Mac Wright 2/19 (5.2 overs)		4/151d (50 overs); Mac Wright 36* (76); Mark Wood 2/25 (10 overs)
3/130d (20 overs); Moeen Ali 47 (41); Gabe Bell 2/29 (4 overs)		8/269 (36.5 overs); Travis Dean 100 (70); Jack Leach 4/104 (9.5 overs)

Match drawn
Richardson Park, Perth
Umpires: Shawn Craig (Aus) and Greg Davidson (Aus)

- Cricket Australia XI won the toss and elected to field.
- 12 players per side (11 batting, 11 fielding).

== Test series ==
=== 1st Test ===
23–27 November 2017
Scorecard

England; 302 (116.4 overs) & 195 (71.4overs)	v	Australia; 328 (130.3 overs) & 0/173 (50 overs)

Australia won by 10 wickets
The Gabba, Brisbane

=== 2nd Test ===
2–6 December 2017 (D/N)
Scorecard

Australia; 8/442 (149 overs) & 138 (58 overs)	v	England; 227 (76.1 overs) & 233 (84.2 overs)

Australia won by 120 runs
Adelaide Oval, Adelaide

=== 3rd Test ===
14–18 December 2017
Scorecard

England; 403 (115.1 overs) & 218 (72.5 overs)	v	Australia; 9/662d (179.3 overs)

Australia won by an innings and 41 runs
WACA Ground, Perth

=== 4th Test ===
26–30 December 2017
Scorecard

Australia; 327 (119 overs) & 4/263d (124.2 overs)	v	England; 491 (144.1 overs)

Match drawn
Melbourne Cricket Ground, Melbourne

=== 5th Test ===
4–8 January 2018
Scorecard

England; 346 (112.3 overs) & 180 (88.1 overs)	v	Australia; 7/649d (193 overs)

Australia won by an innings and 123 runs
Sydney Cricket Ground, Sydney

== 50-over tour match ==
=== Cricket Australia XI vs England ===
11 January 2018 (D/N)
Scorecard

Cricket Australia XI; 9/258 (50 overs)	v	England; 5/259 (40.5 overs)
Travis Dean 62 (63); Adil Rashid 3/45 (10 overs)		Eoin Morgan 81* (76); Gabe Bell 2/35 (7.5 overs)

England won by 5 wickets
Drummoyne Oval, Sydney
Umpires: Gerard Abood (Aus) and Claire Polosak (Aus)

- Cricket Australia XI won the toss and elected to bat.
- 12 players per side (11 batting, 11 fielding).

== ODI series ==
=== 1st ODI ===
14 January 2018
14:20 (D/N)
Scorecard

Australia; 8/304 (50 overs)	v	England; 5/308 (48.5 overs)
Aaron Finch 107 (119); Liam Plunkett 3/71 (10 overs)		Jason Roy 180 (151); Pat Cummins 2/63 (10 overs)

England won by 5 wickets
Melbourne Cricket Ground, Melbourne
Umpires: Simon Fry (Aus) and Chris Gaffaney (NZ)
Player of the match: Jason Roy (Eng)

- England won the toss and elected to field.
- Andrew Tye (Aus) made his ODI debut.
- Jos Buttler (Eng) played his 100th ODI.
- Jason Roy (Eng) made the highest score by an England batsman in ODIs.
- This was the highest successful run chase at this venue in ODIs.

=== 2nd ODI ===
19 January 2018
13:20 (D/N)
Scorecard

Australia; 9/270 (50 overs)	v	England; 6/274 (44.2 overs)
Aaron Finch 106 (114); Joe Root 2/31 (7 overs)		Jonny Bairstow 60 (56); Mitchell Starc 4/59 (10 overs)

England won by 4 wickets
The Gabba, Brisbane
Umpires: Kumar Dharmasena (SL) and Sam Nogajski (Aus)
Player of the match: Joe Root (Eng)

- Australia won the toss and elected to bat.
- Alex Carey and Jhye Richardson (Aus) both made their ODI debuts.
- This was Eoin Morgan's 70th ODI as England captain, a new record.
- Liam Plunkett (Eng) took his 100th wicket in ODIs.
- Aaron Finch scored his 10th ODI century, becoming the fastest Australian to reach that milestone (83 innings).

=== 3rd ODI ===
21 January 2018
14:20 (D/N)
Scorecard

England; 6/302 (50 overs)	v	Australia; 6/286 (50 overs)
Jos Buttler 100* (83); Josh Hazlewood 2/58 (10 overs)		Aaron Finch 62 (53); Mark Wood 2/46 (10 overs)

England won by 16 runs
Sydney Cricket Ground, Sydney
Umpires: Simon Fry (Aus) and Chris Gaffaney (NZ)
Player of the match: Jos Buttler (Eng)

- Australia won the toss and elected to field.
- Joe Root (Eng) played in his 100th ODI.

=== 4th ODI ===
26 January 2018
13:50 (D/N)
Scorecard

England; 196 (44.5 overs)	v	Australia; 7/197 (37 overs)
Chris Woakes 78 (82); Pat Cummins 4/24 (10 overs)		Travis Head 96 (107); Adil Rashid 3/49 (10 overs)

Australia won by 3 wickets
Adelaide Oval, Adelaide
Umpires: Kumar Dharmasena (SL) and Sam Nogajski (Aus)
Player of the match: Pat Cummins (Aus)

- Australia won the toss and elected to field.
- Travis Head (Aus) and Chris Woakes (Eng) both scored their 1,000th run in ODIs.

=== 5th ODI ===
28 January 2018
11:20
Scorecard

England; 259 (47.4 overs)	v	Australia; 247 (48.2 overs)
Joe Root 62 (68); Andrew Tye 5/46 (9.4 overs)		Marcus Stoinis 87 (99); Tom Curran 5/35 (9.2 overs)

England won by 12 runs
Perth Stadium, Perth
Umpires: Simon Fry (Aus) and Chris Gaffaney (NZ)
Player of the match: Tom Curran (Eng)

- Australia won the toss and elected to field.
- The venue became 19th venue in Australia to host an ODI.
- Andrew Tye took his maiden ODI five-wicket haul and also the maiden ODI five-wicket haul at the venue.
- Tom Curran (Eng) took his maiden ODI five-wicket haul.
