= South African cricket team in Australia in 2016–17 =

International cricket tour

	Australia	South Africa
- Dates: 22 October 2016 – 27 November 2016
Captains	Steve Smith	Faf du Plessis

Test series
- Result: South Africa won the 3-match series 2–1
Most runs	Usman Khawaja (314)	Quinton de Kock (281)
Most wickets	Josh Hazlewood (17)	Kagiso Rabada (15)
- Player of the series: Vernon Philander (SA)

The South African cricket team toured Australia in November 2016 to play three Test matches. South Africa won the series 2–1, with victories in Perth and Hobart.

In April 2016, Cricket Australia (CA) suggested that the third Test at the Adelaide Oval could be played as a day/night match, but there was some reluctance from the South African cricketers. In June, CA confirmed that the Adelaide Test would be played as a day/night game. Prior to the series, both teams played practice day/night matches.

South Africa played 2 two-day day/night warm-up fixtures at the Adelaide Oval and the Melbourne Cricket Ground in preparation for the day-night Test match.

Following the conclusion of the second Test, footage emerged of South Africa's captain Faf du Plessis apparently shining the ball using a sweet in his mouth. He was charged by the International Cricket Council (ICC) for ball tampering and pled not-guilty. Hashim Amla said that the situation was "ridiculous" and "a joke". It was suggested that a hearing would take place after the conclusion of the third Test, as Cricket South Africa (CSA) had engaged legal representation for du Plessis. However, on 22 November, du Plessis was found guilty of ball tampering, fined his match fee from the Hobart Test, but was allowed to play in the Adelaide Test. After du Plessis was found guilty he said he disagreed with the verdict stating "I felt like I have done nothing wrong". Du Plessis appealed the charge, but that was rejected on 21 December 2016. The initial penalties of losing his match fee and getting three demerit points stood, but he was not punished with a one-match ban.

== Squads ==
Australia	South Africa
Steve Smith (c); David Warner (vc); Jackson Bird; Joe Burns; Callum Ferguson; Peter Handscomb; Josh Hazlewood; Usman Khawaja; Nathan Lyon; Nic Maddinson; Mitchell Marsh; Shaun Marsh; Joe Mennie; Peter Nevill (wk); Matt Renshaw; Chadd Sayers; Peter Siddle; Mitchell Starc; Adam Voges; Matthew Wade (wk)	Faf du Plessis (c); Kyle Abbott; Hashim Amla; Temba Bavuma; Stephen Cook; Quinton de Kock (wk); JP Duminy; Dean Elgar; Keshav Maharaj; Morné Morkel; Vernon Philander; Dwaine Pretorius; Kagiso Rabada; Rilee Rossouw; Tabraiz Shamsi; Dale Steyn; Dane Vilas (wk)

Dale Steyn suffered a shoulder injury during the first Test and was ruled out of the rest of the series. Dwaine Pretorius was added to South Africa's squad to replace Steyn. Joe Burns and Callum Ferguson were added to Australia's squad for the second Test, while Shaun Marsh was ruled out with a broken finger. Peter Siddle was ruled out due to a back injury and Jackson Bird was added to Australia's team as cover for him.

For the third Test of the tour, Australia added Matt Renshaw, Peter Handscomb, Nic Maddinson, Chadd Sayers and Matthew Wade to their squad. Joe Burns, Callum Ferguson, Peter Nevill and Joe Mennie were all dropped, while Adam Voges was ruled out with concussion.

== Tour matches ==
=== Two-day: Cricket Australia XI vs South Africa XI ===
22–23 October 2016 (D/N)
Scorecard

South Africa XI	v	Cricket Australia XI
415 (89.5 overs); Quinton de Kock 122 (103); Ryan Lees 2/21 (12.5 overs)		103 (30.4 overs); Matthew Short 57 (61); Dale Steyn 2/9 (6 overs)
5/181 (44 overs); Rilee Rossouw 77 (84); Brendan Doggett 1/23 (4 overs)

Match drawn
Adelaide Oval, Adelaide
Umpires: Shawn Craig (Aus) and John Ward (Aus)
Player of the match: Quinton de Kock (SA)

- South Africa XI won the toss and elected to bat.
- Players per side Cricket Australia XI 12 (11 batting, 11 fielding); South Africa 16 (11 batting, 11 fielding)

=== Two-day: South Australia XI vs South Africa XI ===
27–28 October 2016
Scorecard

South Africa XI	v	South Australia
489 (89.5 overs); Dean Elgar 117 (143); David Grant 2/82 (17 overs)		8/435 (80.2 overs); Tim Ludeman 167 (134); Keshav Maharaj 3/59 (17.2 overs)

Match drawn
Glenelg Oval, Glenelg East
Umpires: Shawn Craig (Aus) and Sam Nogajski (Aus)
Player of the match: Tim Ludeman (South Australia)

- South Africa XI won the toss and elected to bat.
- 15 players per side (11 batting, 11 fielding).

=== 50-overs: Victoria XI vs South Africans ===
19 November 2016 (D/N)
Scorecard

Victoria XI (Victoria (state)); 258 (45.2 overs)	v	South Africans; 4/205 (50 overs)
Evan Gulbis 53 (28); Tabraiz Shamsi 4/72 (12 overs)		Hashim Amla 81* (114); Jackson Coleman 2/26 (9 overs)

Victoria XI won by 53 runs
Melbourne Cricket Ground, Melbourne
Umpires: Gerard Abood (Aus) and Mick Martell (Aus)
Player of the match: Hashim Amla (South Africans)

- South Africans won the toss and elected to field.
- Players per side: Victoria XI 12 (11 batting, 11 fielding); South Africans 15 (11 batting, 11 fielding).

== Test series ==
=== 1st Test ===
3–7 November 2016
Scorecard

South Africa	v	Australia
242 (63.4 overs); Quinton de Kock 84 (101); Mitchell Starc 4/71 (18.4 overs)		244 (70.2 overs); David Warner 97 (100); Vernon Philander 4/56 (19.2 overs)
8/540d (160.1 overs); JP Duminy 141 (225); Peter Siddle 2/62 (26 overs)		361 (119.1 overs); Usman Khawaja 97 (182); Kagiso Rabada 5/92 (31 overs)

South Africa won by 177 runs
WACA Ground, Perth
Umpires: Aleem Dar (Pak) and Nigel Llong (Eng)
Player of the match: Kagiso Rabada (SA)

- South Africa won the toss and elected to bat.
- Keshav Maharaj (SA) made his Test debut.
- Australia's collapse of 10/86 was their worst collapse after having an opening stand of 150 or more, and third worst by any team in Tests.
- Dean Elgar and Jean-Paul Duminy's partnership of 250 is South Africa's highest partnership in Perth, the third highest overall in Perth, and their second highest against Australia.
- This was Australia's first loss in the opening Test of the home series since 1988.
- It was also Australia's first Test match loss at home since they lost in Perth against South Africa in 2012.

=== 2nd Test ===
12–16 November 2016
Scorecard

Australia	v	South Africa
85 (32.5 overs); Steve Smith 48* (80); Vernon Philander 5/21 (10.1 overs)		326 (100.5 overs); Quinton de Kock 104 (143); Josh Hazlewood 6/89 (30.5 overs)
161 (60.1 overs); Usman Khawaja 64 (121); Kyle Abbott 6/77 (23.1 overs)

South Africa won by an innings and 80 runs
Bellerive Oval, Hobart
Umpires: Aleem Dar (Pak) and Richard Kettleborough (Eng)
Player of the match: Kyle Abbott (SA)

- South Africa won the toss and elected to field.
- No play was possible on day 2 due to rain.
- Callum Ferguson and Joe Mennie (Aus) both made their Test debuts.
- Australia's first innings total is their lowest at home for 32 years and their second-shortest innings at home in terms of balls faced.
- This was South Africa's third consecutive Test series win in Australia.
- This was South Africa's first win against Australia by an innings in Australia.

=== 3rd Test ===
24–28 November 2016 (D/N)
Scorecard

South Africa	v	Australia
9/259d (76 overs); Faf du Plessis 118* (164); Josh Hazlewood 4/68 (22 overs)		383 (121.1 overs); Usman Khawaja 145 (308); Kyle Abbott 3/49 (29 overs)
250 (85.2 overs); Stephen Cook 104 (240); Mitchell Starc 4/80 (23.2 overs)		3/127 (40.5 overs); David Warner 47 (51); Kyle Abbott 1/26 (10 overs)

Australia won by 7 wickets
Adelaide Oval, Adelaide
Umpires: Richard Kettleborough (Eng) and Nigel Llong (Eng)
Player of the match: Usman Khawaja (Aus)

- South Africa won the toss and elected to bat.
- This was the third day/night Test match.
- Peter Handscomb, Nic Maddinson, Matt Renshaw (Aus); and Tabraiz Shamsi (SA) all made their Test debuts.
- Faf du Plessis became the first player for South Africa to score a century in a day/night Test match.
- Usman Khawaja became the first player for Australia to score a century in a day/night Test match.

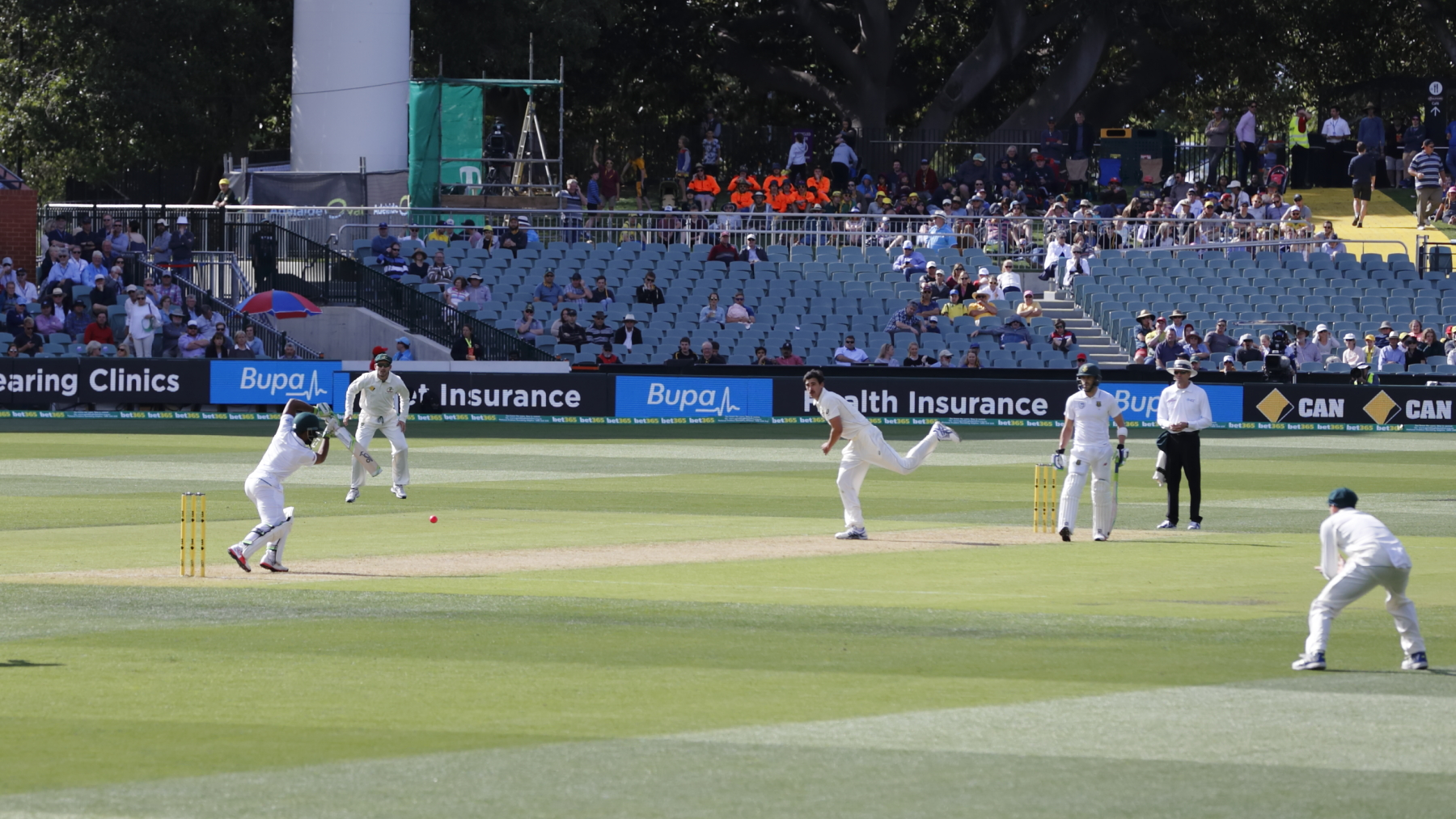
Mitchell Starc bowling to Temba Bavuma during the third Test at the Adelaide Oval
