= Cricket Australia XI =

Australian domestic cricket team

Personnel
- Captain: Jake Lehmann (most recent)
- Coach: N/A

Team information
- Colours: Yellow Green
- Home ground: Allan Border Field
- Capacity: 4,500
- Secondary home ground: Bellerive Oval
- Secondary ground capacity: 19,500

History
- First-class debut: New Zealand in 2015 at Canberra
- List A debut: New South Wales in 2015 at Bankstown Oval, Sydney
- JLT Cup wins: 0
- Official website: Cricket Australia
First-class
One-day

Cricket Australia XI is a domestic cricket team that plays matches against international teams touring Australia.

Cricket Australia XI played in Australia's limited-overs tournament from 2015–16 to 2017–18. Before each tournament, a 14-man squad was selected from players with state contracts who had not been picked in their respective states' 14-man List A squads for that season's tournament. The aim was to develop their skills against top players. The addition of the Cricket Australia XI to the limited-overs cricket tournament expanded the competition to seven teams. The team made their List A debut against New South Wales on 5 October 2015, losing by 279 runs. They scored their first win five days later against Tasmania, winning by 3 runs.

Cricket Australia XI, often with more experienced personnel, now play first-class and T20 matches against touring teams, rather than playing in the one-day competition.

== Formation ==
Announcing the formation of the team in May 2015, Cricket Australia's team performance manager Pat Howard said, "We know we've got the talent and we want to be able to expose these players to more high-pressure game time to help the states and to help the overall national cause."

The team was selected from those young players who were not included in any of the six state squads for the 2015–16 competition. Cricket Australia's national talent manager Greg Chappell said he was confident the side would be competitive against the state teams.

== 2015–16 Matador Cup season ==
Cricket Australia XI were overwhelmed in their first two matches of the 2015–16 Matador Cup. In the first, New South Wales scored 3 for 338 then dismissed Cricket Australia XI for 59. Eight of the team were playing their first List A match. In the second match, Victoria dismissed Cricket Australia XI for 79 and made 1 for 81 in 11.1 overs. In their third match, Cricket Australia XI scored 7 for 241 and restricted Tasmania to 9 for 238, winning by three runs. Marcus Harris, who scored 84 from 94 balls, won the man of the match award. They again lost heavily in their fourth match, when Western Australia made 5 for 347 and dismissed them for 101. In their fifth match they replied to Queensland's 7 for 282 with 248 all out, Hilton Cartwright scoring 99 off 96 balls and winning the man of the match award. In their sixth and final match South Australia made 5 for 244 and dismissed Cricket Australia XI for 168.

They finished at the bottom of the table. Their leading run-scorer, with 180 runs, was Hilton Cartwright, who also had the highest average, 45.00, and strike-rate, 87.80 runs per 100 balls. Jack Wildermuth took the most wickets, six, and had the best bowling average, 38.00. Matt Dixon had the best figures, 3 for 40.

=== 2015–16 Matador Cup squad ===
- Riley Ayre (ACT/NSW, played in 2 matches)
- James Bazley (Qld, 5)
- William Bosisto (WA, 6)
- Hilton Cartwright (WA, 5)
- Matt Dixon (WA, 5)
- Seb Gotch (Vic, 5)
- Alex Gregory (SA, 5)
- Marcus Harris (WA, 6)
- Liam Hatcher (NSW, 2)
- Ryan Lees (Tas, 3)
- James Peirson (Qld, 6)
- Matthew Short (Vic, 6)
- Mitchell Swepson (Qld, 5)
- Jack Wildermuth (Qld, 5)

Bosisto captained the side in five matches, Peirson in one.

== 2016–17 Matador Cup season ==
Cricket Australia XI were more competitive in the 2016–17 Matador Cup, especially in batting, although they lost all six matches. In the first match they made 5 for 274, Ryan Gibson scoring 106 and winning the man of the match award, before Queensland replied with 7 for 278. In the next match they scored 9 for 236 and Tasmania replied with 2 for 239. In the third match New South Wales made 6 for 328, and Cricket Australia XI fell only four runs short in reply with 6 for 324, Gibson top-scoring with 97. The fourth match was more one-sided: Victoria dismissed Cricket Australia XI for 153 and made 6 for 154 in 21.4 overs. In the fifth match South Australia hit a record score for List A cricket in Australia, 7 for 420, and in reply Cricket Australia XI reached 3 for 226 in the 29th over before being dismissed for 318. In the rain-affected final match Cricket Australia XI scored 8 for 147 off their 15 overs, and Western Australia reached the target of 156 with eight balls to spare.

The leading run-scorers were Gibson with 293 runs at an average of 48.83, and Will Bosisto with 251 at 41.83. Sam Harper had the highest run-rate, scoring his 94 runs at a rate of 136 per 100 balls. The most successful bowler was Arjun Nair with 10 wickets at 24.50; he also had the best figures of 3 for 53.

=== 2016–17 Matador Cup squad ===
- Xavier Bartlett (Qld, played in 3 matches)
- James Bazley (Qld, 6)
- William Bosisto (WA, 6)
- Jake Carder (WA, 5)
- Brendan Doggett (Qld, 4)
- Ryan Gibson (NSW, 6)
- David Grant (SA, 1)
- Sam Grimwade (Vic, 2)
- Sam Harper (Vic, 6)
- Liam Hatcher (NSW, 3)
- Josh Inglis (WA, 6)
- Josh Lalor (NSW, 1)
- Ryan Lees (Tas, 2)
- Arjun Nair (NSW, 5)
- Tom O'Donnell (Vic, 4)
- Jason Sangha (NSW, 1)
- Matthew Short (Vic, 5)

Bosisto captained the side in all six matches.

== 2017–18 JLT One-Day Cup season ==
Cricket Australia XI played six matches, winning one, losing five, and finishing in last place.

=== Squad ===
- Beau Webster (captain) (played all 6 matches)
- Max Bryant (6)
- Jake Carder (6)
- Jackson Coleman (4)
- Daniel Fallins (2)
- David Grant (2)
- Clint Hinchliffe (6)
- Matthew Kuhnemann (1)
- Jonathan Merlo (4)
- Harry Nielsen (6)
- Ben Pengelley (5)
- Mark Steketee (4)
- Charlie Stobo (2)
- Henry Thornton (3)
- Param Uppal (6)
- Mac Wright (3)

== 2017–18 Ashes Series Tour matches ==
Cricket Australia XI played two first-class matches, a two-day practice match and one List A match against England as pre-test warm-up matches for the 2017–18 Ashes series and limited-overs tour.

=== Squad ===
The squad for the tour matches, named in November 2017:

Name	Nat	Birth date	Batting style	Bowling style	State Team
Batsmen
Jake Carder	(Australia)	11 December 1995 (age 30)	Left-handed	Right-arm medium	Western Australia
Ryan Gibson	(Australia)	30 December 1993 (age 32)	Right-handed	Right-arm medium	New South Wales
Nick Larkin	(Australia)	1 May 1990 (age 36)	Right-handed	Right-arm medium	New South Wales
Will Pucovski	(Australia)	2 February 1998 (age 28)	Right-handed	Right-arm off-break	Victoria
All-rounders
Simon Milenko	(Australia)	24 November 1988 (age 37)	Right-handed	Right-arm fast-medium	Tasmania
Jason Sangha	(Australia)	8 September 1998 (age 27)	Right-handed	Right-arm leg-break	New South Wales
Matt Short	(Australia)	8 November 1995 (age 30)	Right-handed	Right-arm off-break	Victoria
Wicket-keepers
Tim Paine	(Australia)	8 December 1984 (age 41)	Right-handed	Right-arm medium	Tasmania
Harry Nielsen	(Australia)	3 May 1995 (age 31)	Left-handed	Right-arm off-break	South Australia
Bowlers
Jackson Coleman	(Australia)	18 December 1991 (age 34)	Right-handed	Left-arm medium-fast	Victoria
Michael Cormack	(Australia)	29 June 1997 (age 29)	Right-handed	Right-arm off-break	South Australia
Daniel Fallins	(Australia)	12 August 1996 (age 29)	Right-handed	Right-arm leg-break	New South Wales
Gurinder Sandhu	(Australia)	14 June 1993 (age 33)	Right-handed	Right-arm fast-medium	New South Wales

Tim Paine captained the team for the first game before being called into Tasmania's Sheffield Shield squad and missing the second. Matthew Short was named captain for the second game, whilst Harry Nielsen replaced Paine in the squad.

=== First class matches ===
8–11 November 2017 (D/N)
Scorecard

England	v	Cricket Australia XI
293 (95 overs); Dawid Malan 63 (128); Daniel Fallins 5/73 (22 overs)		9/233d (76 overs); Tim Paine 52 (98); Mason Crane 3/78 (21 overs)
203 (67.4 overs); Jonny Bairstow 61* (66); Simon Milenko 5/34 (16.4 overs)		75 (40.1 overs); Matthew Short 28 (55); Chris Woakes 4/17 (10 overs)

England won by 192 runs
Adelaide Oval, Adelaide
Umpires: Simon Fry (Aus) and David Shepard (Aus)

- Cricket Australia XI won the toss and elected to field.
- Jackson Coleman, Daniel Fallins and Jason Sangha (Cricket Australia XI) all made their first-class debuts.
- Jake Ball (England) did not bat in the second innings due to injury.

15–18 November 2017
Scorecard

Cricket Australia XI	v	England
250 (91.3 overs); Matthew Short 51 (122); Chris Woakes 6/55 (19 overs)		515 (142.5 overs); Mark Stoneman 111 (159); Matthew Short 4/103 (32 overs)
4/364 (110 overs); Matthew Short 134* (264); Moeen Ali 2/88 (32 overs)

Match drawn
Tony Ireland Stadium, Townsville
Umpires: Nathan Johnstone (Aus) and Paul Wilson (Aus)

- Cricket Australia XI won the toss and elected to bat.
- Harry Nielsen (Cricket Australia XI) made his first-class debut.
- Jason Sangha and Matthew Short (Cricket Australia XI) both made their maiden first-class centuries, with Sangha becoming the second-youngest batsman to score a first-class century against England.

9–10 December 2017
Scorecard

England	v	Cricket Australia XI
9/314d (69.2 overs); Keaton Jennings 80 (116); Mac Wright 2/19 (5.2 overs)		4/151d (50 overs); Mac Wright 36* (76); Mark Wood 2/25 (10 overs)
3/130d (20 overs); Moeen Ali 47 (41); Gabe Bell 2/29 (4 overs)		8/269 (36.5 overs); Travis Dean 100 (70); Jack Leach 4/104 (9.5 overs)

Match drawn
Richardson Park, Perth
Umpires: Shawn Craig (Aus) and Greg Davidson (Aus)

- Cricket Australia XI won the toss and elected to field.
- 12 players per side (11 batting, 11 fielding).

=== List A Match ===
11 January 2018
02:20
Scorecard

Cricket Australia XI	v	England

Drummoyne Oval, Sydney

== Similarly named teams ==
Teams under similar names often play matches against visiting Test teams. A Cricket Australia Chairman's XI played eleven non-first-class matches between 2003 and 2013. A Cricket Australia Invitation XI played a first-class match in 2013–14. Apart from their List A competition matches, Cricket Australia XI teams have also played three first-class and several other matches since 2014–15.

== See also ==
- National Performance Squad
- Unicorns, a similar team for English players
- West Indies B, a similar team for West Indian players
- Australia A cricket team
- Australian Cricket Academy XI
