= West Indian cricket team in Australia in 2015–16 =

International cricket tour

| | Australia | West Indies |
- Dates: 2 December 2015 – 7 January 2016
| Captains | Steve Smith | Jason Holder |

Test series
- Result: Australia won the 3-match series 2–0
| Most runs | Adam Voges (375) | Darren Bravo (247) |
| Most wickets | James Pattinson (13); Nathan Lyon (13) | Jomel Warrican (5) |
- Player of the series: Adam Voges (Aus)

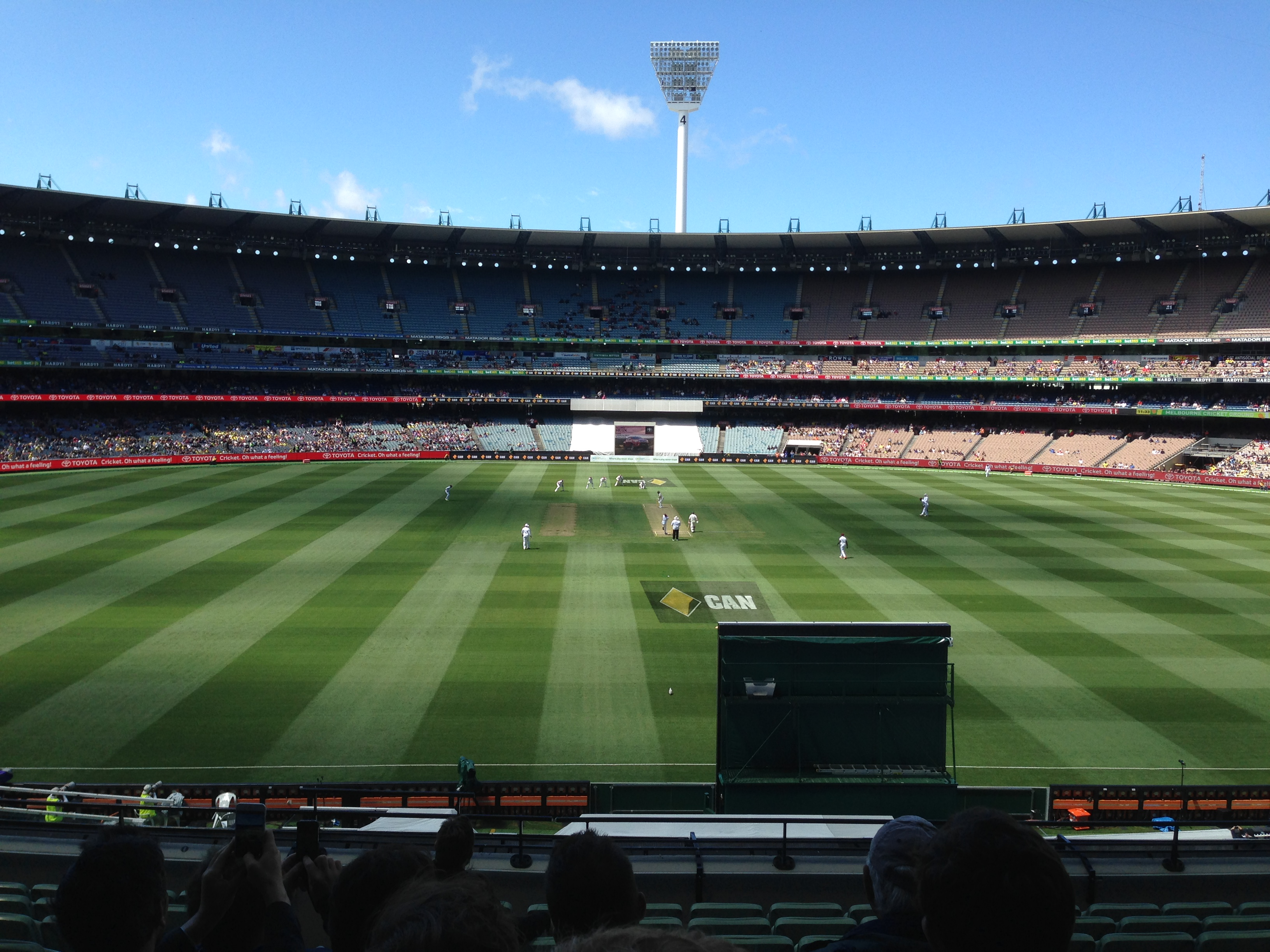
Day 1 of the Boxing Day Test

The West Indies cricket team toured Australia from 2 December 2015 to 7 January 2016 to play two tour matches and three Test matches. Australia won the Test series 2–0, retaining the Frank Worrell Trophy.

Adam Voges won the inaugural Richie Benaud Medal as the player of the series.

== Squads ==
Tests
| Australia | West Indies |
|---|---|
| Steve Smith (c); David Warner (vc); Scott Boland; Joe Burns; ~~Nathan Coulter-Nile~~; Josh Hazlewood; Usman Khawaja; Nathan Lyon; Mitchell Marsh; Shaun Marsh; Peter Nevill (wk); Steve O'Keefe; James Pattinson; Peter Siddle; Adam Voges | Jason Holder (c); Kraigg Brathwaite (vc); Devendra Bishoo; Jermaine Blackwood; Carlos Brathwaite; Darren Bravo; Rajendra Chandrika; Miguel Cummins; Shane Dowrich; ~~Shannon Gabriel~~; Shai Hope; Denesh Ramdin (wk); Kemar Roach; Marlon Samuels; Jerome Taylor; Jomel Warrican |

West Indies fast bowler Shannon Gabriel was ruled out of the series after sustaining an ankle injury on day one of the Hobart Test. He was replaced by Miguel Cummins. Usman Khawaja and Stephen O'Keefe were added to Australia's squad for the second and third Tests. Nathan Coulter-Nile was ruled out of the series after he dislocated his shoulder while playing in the Big Bash League. He was replaced by Scott Boland.

== Tour matches ==
=== First-class match: Cricket Australia XI vs West Indians ===
2 – 5 December
Scorecard

| West Indians | v | Cricket Australia XI |
| 243 (90.5 overs); Darren Bravo 51 (158); Simon Milenko 5/76 (22.5 overs) | | 444 (104.2 overs); Matthew Short 76 (115); Jason Holder 4/76 (22 overs) |
| 210 (58.2 overs); Jason Holder 65 (99); Cameron Boyce 4/84 (20 overs) | | 0/13 (2.5 overs); Jake Carder 7* (5) |

Cricket Australia XI won by 10 wickets
Allan Border Field, Brisbane
Umpires: Phillip Gillespie (Aus) and Sam Nogajski (Aus)

- West Indians won the toss and elected to bat.
- Rain interrupted play during day 1 and only 60 overs were possible.
- Tom Andrews, James Bazley, Jake Carder, Josh Inglis, Ryan Lees and James Peirson (Cricket Australia XI) all made their first-class debuts.

=== Tour match: Victorian XI vs West Indians ===
19 – 20 December
Scorecard

| West Indians | v | Victoria |
| 8/303d (90 overs); Kraigg Brathwaite 78 (175); Jeremy Hart 4/93 (18 overs) | | 3/169 (58 overs); Jake Hancock 80* (168); Devendra Bishoo 2/60 (18 overs) |

Match drawn
Simonds Stadium, Geelong
Umpires: Stephen Brne (Aus) and David Shepard (Aus)

- Victorian XI won the toss and elected to field.
- 12 players per side (11 batting, 11 fielding).

== Test series (Frank Worrell Trophy) ==
=== 1st Test ===
10 – 14 December 2015
Scorecard

| Australia | v | West Indies |
| 4/583d (114 overs); Adam Voges 269* (285); Jomel Warrican 3/157 (28 overs) | | 223 (70 overs); Darren Bravo 108 (177); Josh Hazlewood 4/45 (18 overs) |
| | | 148 (36.3 overs) (f/o); Kraigg Brathwaite 94 (122); James Pattinson 5/27 (8 overs) |

Australia won by an innings and 212 runs
Bellerive Oval, Hobart
Umpires: Marais Erasmus (SA) and Ian Gould (Eng)
Player of the match: Adam Voges (Aus)

- Australia won the toss and elected to bat.
- Play was interrupted by rain on three occasions on Day 2 and umpires had to call for an early tea with play eventually resuming after the tea break. Play was also interrupted by rain on Day 3 with umpires calling for an early lunch and play finally resumed after the lunch break.
- The 449-run partnership between Adam Voges and Shaun Marsh is the highest 4th wicket partnership in Test cricket history. It is the second-highest partnership in Tests for Australia and is also the highest partnership in Tests against the West Indies. It is the highest partnership in Tests played in Australia and is also the sixth-highest partnership ever in the history of Test Cricket.

=== 2nd Test ===
26 – 30 December 2015
Scorecard

| Australia | v | West Indies |
| 3/551d (135 overs); Usman Khawaja 144 (227); Jerome Taylor 2/97 (22 overs) | | 271 (100.3 overs); Darren Bravo 81 (204); Nathan Lyon 4/66 (29 overs) |
| 3/179d (32 overs); Steve Smith 70* (70); Jason Holder 2/49 (11 overs) | | 282 (88.3 overs); Jason Holder 68 (86); Mitchell Marsh 4/61 (17.3 overs) |

Australia won by 177 runs
Melbourne Cricket Ground, Melbourne
Umpires: Marais Erasmus (SA) and Chris Gaffaney (NZ)
Player of the match: Nathan Lyon (Aus)

- West Indies won the toss and elected to field.
- Rain delayed the start of play by one hour on Day 1.
- Carlos Brathwaite (WI) made his Test debut.
- The 100-run partnership between Denesh Ramdin and Jason Holder is the highest 6th wicket partnership for the West Indies at this ground.
- Australia won the series and retained the Frank Worrell Trophy, a trophy they've held for 20 years.

=== 3rd Test ===
3 – 7 January 2016
Scorecard

| West Indies | v | Australia |
| 330 (112.1 overs); Kraigg Brathwaite 85 (174); Steve O'Keefe 3/63 (26.1 overs) | | 2/176d (38 overs); David Warner 122* (103); Jomel Warrican 2/62 (15 overs) |

Match drawn
Sydney Cricket Ground, Sydney
Umpires: Chris Gaffaney (NZ) and Ian Gould (Eng)
Player of the match: David Warner (Aus)

- West Indies won the toss and elected to bat.
- Rain stopped play at 13:46 on Day 1 and delayed play for an hour and a half before tea was taken. Play eventually resumed at 16:00. Play was again delayed by rain from 16:50 to 17:35.
- Rain delayed the start of play on Day 2 by 39 minutes. Rain again delayed play from 10:41 to 12:00. Play was then delayed by rain at 12:15 and lunch was taken. Play resumed after lunch until rain once again stopped play at 13:42 and no play was possible for the rest of the day.
- No play was possible on Days 3 and 4 due to rain. This was the first time since Pakistan's tour in 1989–90 that two consecutive days were washed out in a Test in Australia.
- The start of play on Day 5 was delayed by an hour and 45 minutes due to rain. Rain further delayed play at 15:30 and tea was taken.
- Nathan Lyon became the fifth Australian spin bowler to take 100 Test wickets in Australia.
- David Warner scored the fastest Test century at this ground.
