= Ryan Gibson (Australian cricketer) =

Australian cricketer (born 1993)

Personal information
- Full name: Ryan James Gibson
- Born: 30 December 1993 (age 32); Penrith, New South Wales, Australia
- Batting: Right-handed
- Bowling: Right-arm medium
- Role: Batter

Domestic team information
- Years: Team
- 2016/17–2018/19: New South Wales (squad no. 22)
- 2016/17–2017/18: Sydney Thunder
- 2020/21-2022/23: Adelaide Strikers (squad no. 88)
- 2020/21–2021/22: South Australia
- FC debut: 4 November 2016 New South Wales v Western Australia
- Last FC: 15 November 2017 Cricket Australia XI v England XI
- LA debut: 1 October 2016 Cricket Australia XI v Queensland
- Last LA: 15 October 2017 South Australia v Western Australia

Career statistics
Competition	FC	LA	T20
Matches	5	17	29
Runs scored	144	453	285
Batting average	18.00	26.64	15.00
100s/50s	0/1	1/3	0/1
Top score	65*	106	53
Catches/stumpings	3/—	4/—	13/—
- Source: Cricinfo, 8 April 2025

Ryan Gibson (born 30 December 1993) is an Australian cricketer. He made his List A debut for Cricket Australia XI in the 2016–17 Matador BBQs One-Day Cup on 1 October 2016. He scored a century and was named man of the match.

== Domestic career ==
He made his first-class debut for New South Wales in the 2016–17 Sheffield Shield season on 4 November 2016. He made his Twenty20 (T20) debut for Sydney Thunder in the 2016–17 Big Bash League season on 20 December 2016.

Gibson played for New South Wales in the 2017–18 JLT One-Day Cup. He scored his only fifty for the tournament against Cricket Australia XI in the 11th match. He played five matches but only managed to score 93 runs at an average of 18.60.
