= Jake Carder =

Australian cricketer (born 1995)

Personal information
- Full name: Jake Michael Carder
- Born: 11 December 1995 (age 30); Perth, Western Australia, Australia
- Batting: Left-handed
- Bowling: Right-arm off break
- Role: Batsman

Domestic team information
- Years: Team
- 2015/17–2017/18: Cricket Australia XI
- 2019/20–2020/21: Western Australia
- 2021/22: South Australia
- FC debut: 2 December 2015 Cricket Australia XI v West Indians
- LA debut: 1 October 2016 Cricket Australia XI v Queensland

Career statistics
Competition	FC	LA	T20
Matches	30	14	1
Runs scored	1,232	461	10
Batting average	23.24	32.92	10.00
100s/50s	1/5	1/2	–/–
Top score	118	102	10
Balls bowled	335	–	–
Wickets	5	–	–
Bowling average	51.80	–	–
5 wickets in innings	0	–	–
10 wickets in match	0	–	–
Best bowling	3/134	–	–
Catches/stumpings	22/–	2/–	1/–
- Source: Cricinfo, 7 February 2024

Jake Michael Carder (born 11 December 1995) is an Australian cricketer. He made his first-class debut for Cricket Australia XI against the West Indians during their tour of Australia in December 2015. He made his List A debut for Cricket Australia XI in the 2016–17 Matador BBQs One-Day Cup on 1 October 2016.

== Domestic career ==
Carder was in the Cricket Australia XI squad for the 2017–18 JLT One-Day Cup. Batting second against South Australia, he scored his maiden List A century. He scored 102 and combined with Beau Webster for a 229-run partnership, the fourth-highest second-wicket partnership in Australia's domestic one-day history. This helped deliver Cricket Australia XI just the second victory in their history. He played every match for Cricket Australia XI and finished the tournament as one of their best batsmen, scoring 200 runs at an average of 33.33.

In September 2021, in the opening match of the 2021–22 Sheffield Shield season, Carder scored his maiden century in first-class cricket, with 118 runs. He made his Twenty20 debut on 26 January 2022, for the Sydney Sixers in the 2021–22 Big Bash League season.
