= Glenn Coleman =

Australian rules footballer (born 1961)

Personal information
- Full name: Glenn Coleman
- Born: 3 February 1961 (age 65)
- Original team: Southern Districts
- Height: 193 cm (6 ft 4 in)
- Weight: 103 kg (16 st 3 lb)
- Position: Ruckman

Playing career^{1}
| Years | Club | Games (Goals) |
| 1980–1984 | Fitzroy | 64 (7) |
| 1986–1989 | Sydney | 61 (57) |
| 1990–1993 | Footscray | 69 (51) |
| Total | | 194 (115) |
- ^{1} Playing statistics correct to the end of 1993.

Glenn Coleman (born 3 February 1961) is a former Australian rules footballer who played with Fitzroy, Sydney and Footscray in the VFL/AFL.

Coleman first played with Fitzroy and made his league debut in 1980. After five seasons with the Lions, he missed the 1985 season due to a serious knee injury. Coleman then returned to Sydney, where he had begun his career with Southern Districts in the local competition, and finished second in their goalkicking with 32 goals in 1988. He represented New South Wales during this time, at interstate football. In 1990 he returned to Victoria and joined Footscray with whom he finished his career.

His son, Jackson, represented Australia at the under-19 Cricket World Cup and has played in the Victorian Football League for Sandringham and Frankston.
