= Riley Ayre =

Australian cricketer (born 1996)

Personal information
- Born: 2 April 1996 (age 30); Denman, Australia
- Batting: Right-handed
- Bowling: Slow left-arm orthodox
- Role: Bowler

Domestic team information
- Years: Team
- 2015: Cricket Australia XI
- 2021/22: New South Wales

Career statistics
Competition	FC	LA
Matches	1	2
Runs scored	1	5
Batting average	-	5.00
100s/50s	0/0	0/0
Top score	1*	5*
Balls bowled	72	72
Wickets	1	0
Bowling average	38.00	-
5 wickets in innings	0	-
10 wickets in match	0	-
Best bowling	1/38	-
Catches/stumpings	0/–	1/–
- Source: Cricinfo, 18 March 2022

Riley Ayre (born 2 April 1996) is an Australian cricketer. He made his List A debut for Cricket Australia XI on 10 October 2015 in the 2015–16 Matador BBQs One-Day Cup. In February 2020, Ayre signed to play domestic cricket in Ireland during the 2020 summer. He made his first-class debut on 15 March 2022, for New South Wales in the 2021–22 Sheffield Shield season.
