= Mac Wright =

Australian cricketer

Macalister Wright
Personal information
- Full name: Macalister Bailey Wright
- Born: 22 January 1998 (age 28); Ferntree Gully, Victoria
- Batting: Right-handed
- Bowling: Right-arm leg break
- Role: All-rounder

Domestic team information
- Years: Team
- 2017/18: Cricket Australia XI
- 2018/19–present: Hobart Hurricanes
- 2019/20–2025/26: Tasmania
- LA debut: 27 September 2017 Cricket Australia XI v South Australia
- Last LA: 17 October 2017 Cricket Australia XI v Western Australia

Career statistics
| Competition | FC | LA | T20 |
|---|---|---|---|
| Matches | 10 | 25 | 28 |
| Runs scored | 454 | 620 | 601 |
| Batting average | 28.37 | 29.52 | 26.13 |
| 100s/50s | 0/3 | 1/3 | 0/5 |
| Top score | 78* | 104 | 70* |
| Balls bowled | – | 56 | 30 |
| Wickets | – | 0 | 1 |
| Bowling average | – | – | 53.00 |
| 5 wickets in innings | – | – | 0 |
| 10 wickets in match | – | – | 0 |
| Best bowling | – | – | 1/28 |
| Catches/stumpings | 3/– | 6/– | 13/– |
- Source: Cricinfo, 20 May 2025

Macalister Bailey Wright (born 22 January 1998) is an Australian cricketer. He made his List A debut for Cricket Australia XI in the 2017–18 JLT One-Day Cup on 27 September 2017.

== Domestic career ==
Wright played for Cricket Australia XI in the 2017–18 JLT One-Day Cup. He made his List A debut in the tournament against South Australia. He bowled 3 overs and conceded 23 runs. He played three matches for the tournament, scoring 42 runs but failing to take his first List A wicket.

In September 2018, he was named in the Hobart Hurricanes' squad for the 2018 Abu Dhabi T20 Trophy. He made his Twenty20 debut for the Hobart Hurricanes in the 2018 Abu Dhabi T20 Trophy on 5 October 2018. On 20 November 2019, in the 2019–20 Marsh One-Day Cup, Wright scored his maiden century in List A cricket. He made his first-class debut on 29 November 2019, for Tasmania in the 2019–20 Sheffield Shield season.

Wright was delisted by Tasmania at the end of the 2025-26 season.

== Personal life ==
In 2022, Wright was studying for a Bachelor of Arts (Psychology) at Deakin University.
