= Jason Sangha =

Australian cricketer (born 1999)

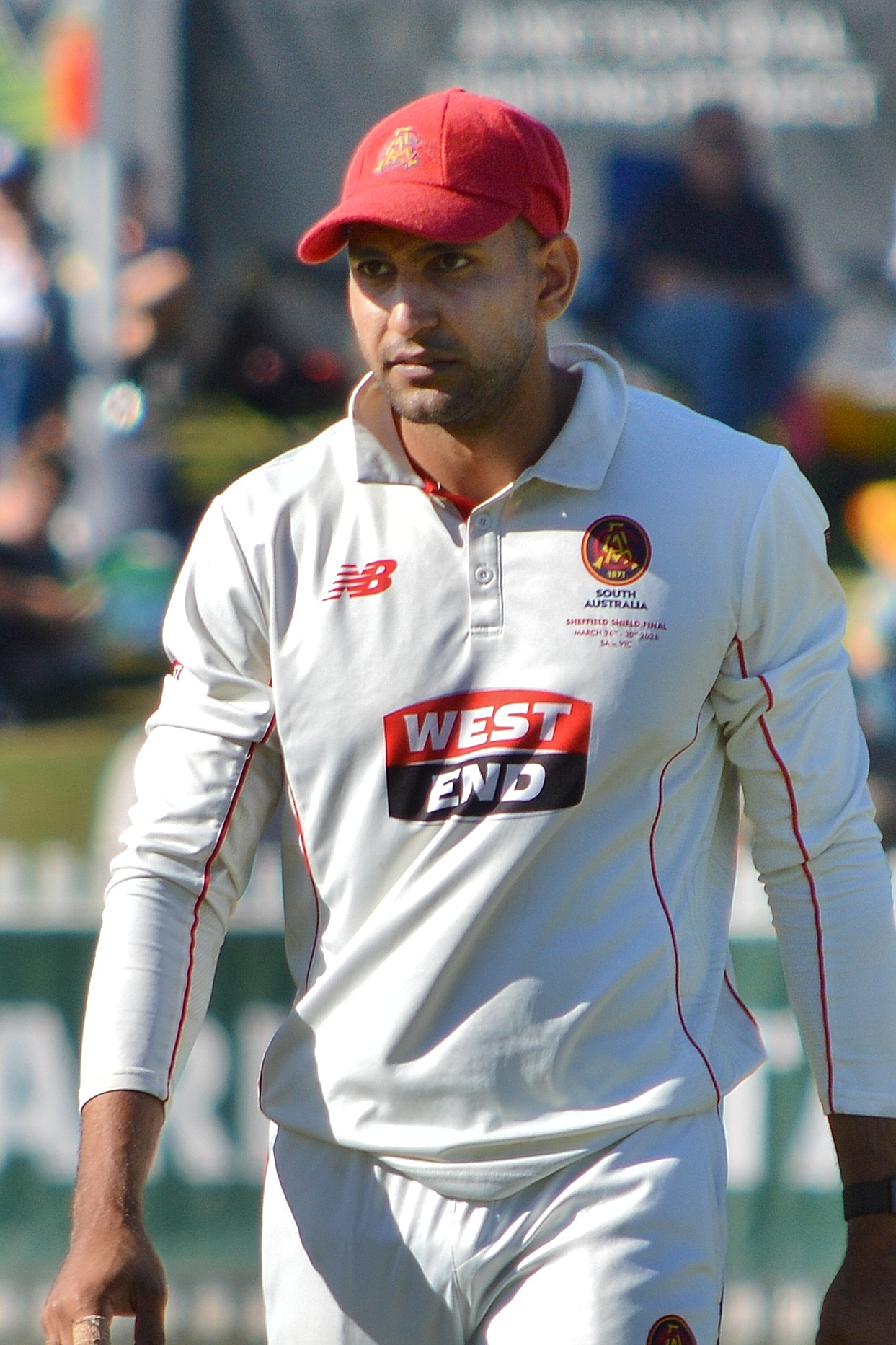
- Sangha playing First Class cricket with South Australian in March 2026

Personal information
- Full name: Jason Jaskirat Singh Sangha
- Born: 8 September 1999 (age 27); Randwick, New South Wales, Australia
- Batting: Right-handed
- Bowling: Right-arm leg break
- Role: Batter

Domestic team information
- Years: Team
- 2016/17: Cricket Australia XI
- 2018/19–2023/24: New South Wales (squad no. 23)
- 2018/19–2025/26: Sydney Thunder (squad no. 23)
- 2024/25–present: South Australia (squad no. 50)
- 2025/26: Adelaide Strikers (squad no. 23)

Career statistics
| Competition | FC | LA | T20 |
|---|---|---|---|
| Matches | 62 | 30 | 43 |
| Runs scored | 3,468 | 473 | 882 |
| Batting average | 35.38 | 18.92 | 26.72 |
| 100s/50s | 9/15 | 0/3 | 0/6 |
| Top score | 202* | 79* | 91* |
| Balls bowled | 1,350 | 214 | 89 |
| Wickets | 19 | 2 | 5 |
| Bowling average | 42.94 | 112.50 | 25.80 |
| 5 wickets in innings | 0 | 0 | 0 |
| 10 wickets in match | 0 | 0 | 0 |
| Best bowling | 3/19 | 2/16 | 2/16 |
| Catches/stumpings | 47/– | 21/– | 23/– |
- Source: ESPNcricinfo, 23 October 2026

Jason Jaskirat Singh Sangha (born 8 September 1999) is an Australian cricketer. He is a right-handed batsman and right-arm leg break bowler. He represents South Australia in Australian domestic cricket.

== Early life and family ==
Sangha was born in Randwick, New South Wales, Australia to parents of Indian descent. He grew up in Newcastle, then at the age of 17 moved to Sydney to play grade cricket for Randwick Petersham Cricket Club.

== Career ==
Sangha made his debut for Australia under-19 team against Pakistan under-19 team in January 2016. Later, he made his List A debut for Cricket Australia XI against South Australia on 15 October 2016. He made his first-class debut for Cricket Australia XI against England on 8 November 2017 in a tour game prior to the 2017–18 Ashes series. He scored his maiden first-class century in the second tour match, becoming the second-youngest player to score a first-class century against England, second to only Sachin Tendulkar.

In December 2017, he was named as the captain of Australia's squad for the 2018 Under-19 Cricket World Cup. He was the leading run-scorer for Australia in the tournament, with 229 runs.

In December 2022, he was named as the captain of the Sydney Thunder, replacing Usman Khawaja.

In April 2024, Sangha was named as part of the South Australian squad ahead of the 2024/25 domestic season. He was named player of the match in his debut Sheffield Shield match for South Australia, scoring 151 and 61. Sangha was part of South Australia's Sheffield Shield and One-Day Cup winning season in his first season with the state, scoring 126 not out in the fourth innings and hitting the winning runs to guide his team to victory in the Sheffield Shield final against Queensland.
