= Alex Gregory (cricketer) =

Australian cricketer (born 1995)

Personal information
- Full name: Alexander James Gregory
- Born: 27 June 1995 (age 31); Adelaide, South Australia
- Batting: Right-handed
- Bowling: Right-arm fast-medium

Domestic team information
- Years: Team
- 2014/15–2016/17: South Australia (squad no. 25)
- 2015/16: Cricket Australia XI
- LA debut: 22 July 2014 National Performance Squad v Australia A

Career statistics
Competition	List A
Matches	13
Runs scored	139
Batting average	15.44
100s/50s	0/0
Top score	42*
Balls bowled	372
Wickets	6
Bowling average	54.00
5 wickets in innings	0
10 wickets in match	0
Best bowling	2/39
Catches/stumpings	4/–
- Source: CricketArchive, 29 August 2020

Alexander James Gregory (born 27 June 1995) is a cricketer who played for South Australia. He made his one day debut on 22 July 2014 for the Australia National Performance Squad against Australia A, as part of the Australia A Team Quadrangular Series in 2014. He was educated at Scotch College and St Peter's College in Adelaide.
