= Ryan Lees =

Australian cricketer (born 1994)

Personal information
- Full name: Ryan Andrew Lees
- Born: 16 February 1994 (age 32); Flinders Island, Tasmania, Australia
- Batting: Right-handed
- Bowling: Right-arm fast-medium
- Role: Bowler

Domestic team information
- Years: Team
- 2015/16–2016/17: Cricket Australia XI

Career statistics
Competition	First-class	List A
Matches	2	5
Runs scored	4	24
Batting average	4.00	6.00
100s/50s	0/0	0/0
Top score	2*	13
Balls bowled	420	180
Wickets	7	2
Bowling average	21.14	93.50
5 wickets in innings	0	0
10 wickets in match	0	0
Best bowling	3/68	1/18
Catches/stumpings	0/–	2/–
- Source: Cricinfo, 5 October 2021

Ryan Lees (born 16 February 1994) is an Australian cricketer. He made his List A debut for Cricket Australia XI on 7 October 2015 in the 2015–16 Matador BBQs One-Day Cup. He made his first-class debut for Cricket Australia XI against the West Indians during their tour of Australia in December 2015.
