= Matt Dixon (cricketer) =

Australian cricketer

Personal information
- Full name: Matthew William Dixon
- Born: 12 June 1992 (age 34); Subiaco, Western Australia
- Batting: Right-handed
- Bowling: Right-arm fast
- Role: Bowler

Domestic team information
- Years: Team
- 2010/11–2011/12: Western Australia
- 2014/15–2015/16: Perth Scorchers
- 2015/16: Cricket Australia XI
- 2016–2017: Essex
- 2018: → Durham (on loan)
- FC debut: 10 March 2011 Western Australia v New South Wales
- LA debut: 23 October 2010 Western Australia v Victoria

Career statistics
Competition	FC	LA	T20
Matches	13	16	9
Runs scored	76	18	2
Batting average	8.44	4.50	0.66
100s/50s	0/0	0/0	0/0
Top score	22	12	1
Balls bowled	1,758	754	174
Wickets	29	16	10
Bowling average	42.48	47.87	25.90
5 wickets in innings	1	0	0
10 wickets in match	0	0	0
Best bowling	5/124	3/40	3/32
Catches/stumpings	1/–	2/–	0/–
- Source: CricketArchive, 30 May 2020

Matthew William Dixon (born 12 June 1992) is an Australian cricketer who has played for Western Australia and the Perth Scorchers domestically.

From Perth, Dixon played cricket for Western Australia at both under-17 and under-19 levels, and also represented the Australian Under-19 cricket team in five One-Day Internationals in 2009, taking three wickets. A right-arm fast bowler, he made his Futures League debut for the Western Australia Under-23s in February 2010, and subsequently made his List A debut for Western Australia against Victoria in October 2010, taking a wicket with his fifth ball and finishing with 1/39 overall. He played two more matches in the 2010–11 Ryobi One-Day Cup before making his first-class debut against New South Wales in March 2011, taking two wickets.

In 2016 Dixon was signed by Essex on a two-year contract to play for them in all formats of the game. As a British passport holder Dixon is not regarded as an overseas player for English domestic cricket purposes. Dixon made his Essex debut against Cambridge MCCU at Fenner's on 31 March 2016.
