= Daniel Fallins =

Australian cricketer (born 1996)

Personal information
- Full name: Daniel Geoffrey Fallins
- Born: 12 August 1996 (age 30)
- Batting: Right-handed
- Bowling: Right-arm leg break
- Role: Bowler

Domestic team information
- Years: Team
- 2017/18–present: New South Wales (squad no. 42)
- 2017/18: Cricket Australia XI (squad no. 13)
- 2017/18: Melbourne Stars (squad no. 21)
- LA debut: 13 October 2017 Cricket Australia XI v Tasmania
- FC debut: 8 November 2017 Cricket Australia XI v England

Career statistics
Competition	FC	LA	T20
Matches	4	4	2
Runs scored	76	18	–
Batting average	25.33	18.00	–
100s/50s	0/0	0/0	–
Top score	29*	17	–
Balls bowled	688	138	30
Wickets	15	3	0
Bowling average	31.60	59.66	–
5 wickets in innings	1	0	–
10 wickets in match	0	0	–
Best bowling	5/73	2/50	–
Catches/stumpings	2/–	1/–	0/–
- Source: CricInfo, 21 January 2020

Daniel Fallins (born 12 August 1996) is an Australian cricketer. He made his List A debut for Cricket Australia XI in the 2017–18 JLT One-Day Cup on 13 October 2017. He made his first-class debut for Cricket Australia XI against England on 8 November 2017 in a tour match prior to the 2017–18 Ashes series. He made his Twenty20 debut for the Melbourne Stars in BBL07 on 12 January 2018.

== Domestic career ==
Fallins was in the Cricket Australia XI squad for the 2017–18 JLT One-Day Cup. He played two matches, bowling only 11 overs and taking just one wicket.
