= 2017–18 Ashes series =

Cricket tour

- Part of English cricket team in Australia in 2017–18
- The Magellan Ashes Series 2017–18 logo
- Date: 23 November 2017 – 8 January 2018
- Location: Australia
- Result: Australia won the five-match series 4–0
- Player of the series: Compton–Miller Medal: Steve Smith (Aus)
Teams
- Australia: England
Captains
- Steve Smith: Joe Root
Most runs
- Steve Smith (687) Shaun Marsh (445) David Warner (441): Dawid Malan (383); Joe Root (378); Alastair Cook (376)
Most wickets
- Pat Cummins (23) Mitchell Starc (22) Nathan Lyon (21): James Anderson (17); Stuart Broad (11); Chris Woakes (10)

The 2017–18 Ashes series (named Magellan Ashes Series for sponsorship reasons) was a series of Test cricket matches contested between England and Australia for The Ashes. The series was played at five venues across Australia between 23 November 2017 and 8 January 2018. England were the defending holders of the Ashes going into the series, having won in 2015.

Australia won the series 4–0, regaining the Ashes after taking an unassailable lead with an innings victory in the third Test.

== Squads ==
Australia	England
Steve Smith (c); David Warner (vc); Tim Paine (wk); Cameron Bancroft; Shaun Marsh; Mitchell Marsh; Peter Handscomb; Usman Khawaja; Josh Hazlewood; Nathan Lyon; Pat Cummins; Jackson Bird; ~~Glenn Maxwell~~; Ashton Agar; ~~Chadd Sayers~~; Mitchell Starc	Joe Root (c); James Anderson (vc); Moeen Ali; Jonny Bairstow (wk); Alastair Cook; Gary Ballance; Stuart Broad; Jake Ball; Mason Crane; Tom Curran; ~~Steven Finn~~; Ben Foakes (wk); ~~George Garton~~; Dawid Malan; Craig Overton; ~~Ben Stokes~~; Mark Stoneman; Chris Woakes; James Vince

In September 2017, Ben Stokes was named in the initial England squad, but was subsequently ruled out of international selection until further notice while a disciplinary process took place. The following month, he was withdrawn from the Ashes squad, pending an investigation, with Steven Finn added to England's squad. However, Finn himself was then ruled out of the tour, injuring his knee prior to the first warm-up game. Tom Curran was called up to replace him. James Anderson was named as England's vice-captain for the Test series in Stokes' absence. George Garton was added to England's squad as cover for Jake Ball during pre-Test tour matches, but returned to the England Lions when Ball recovered in time for the first Test.

Australia delayed naming its squad for the first two Tests until 17 November 2017, selecting Cameron Bancroft to replace Matthew Renshaw. Tim Paine returned to the team after a seven-year absence, ahead of Matthew Wade and Peter Nevill. Before the first Test, Glenn Maxwell was added to Australia's squad as cover for David Warner, who injured his neck at training. Mitchell Marsh was later added to Australia's squad ahead of the third Test, replacing Chadd Sayers.

Australia's Mitchell Starc and England's Craig Overton were both ruled out of the fourth Test, with heel and rib injuries respectively. Maxwell was replaced by Ashton Agar for the fifth Test. England's Chris Woakes was ruled out of the fifth Test due to injury.

== Venues ==
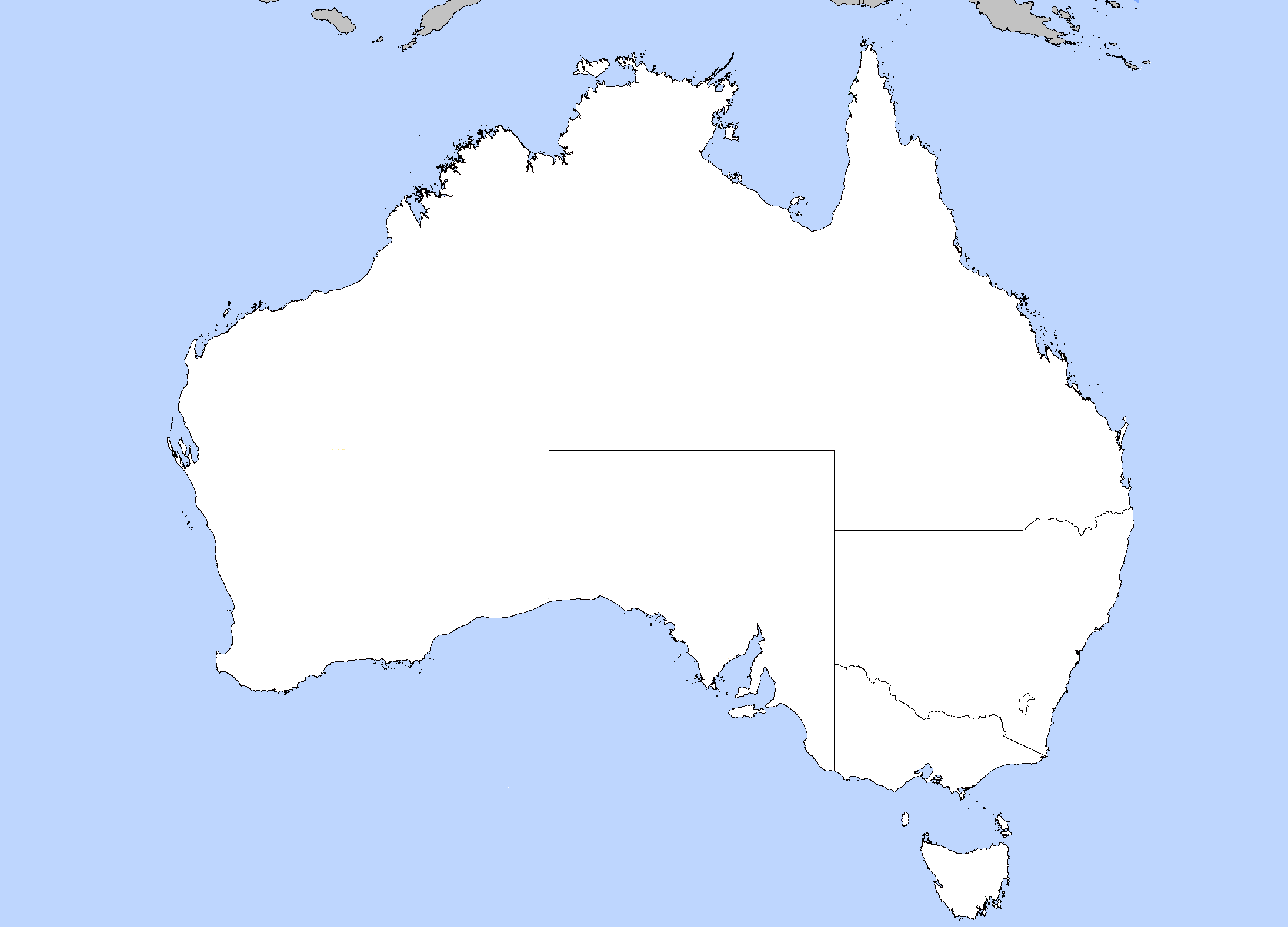

The five venues were the Gabba, Adelaide Oval, the WACA Ground, the Melbourne Cricket Ground and the Sydney Cricket Ground.

The WACA Ground was expected to host its final Test during the series, prior to the opening of the new Optus Stadium. However, it was said in November 2015 that construction of the new stadium was well ahead of schedule and the Perth Test could be hosted at the new venue. A decision on the venue was made in May 2017, with the WACA Ground confirmed as the venue, as the new stadium would not be ready in time.

In December 2016, Cricket Australia (CA) were looking at hosting the first day/night Ashes match, with Adelaide being the likely venue. On 12 December 2016, it was confirmed that Adelaide Oval would host the first day/night Ashes Test.

== Matches ==
=== First Test ===
23–27 November 2017
Scorecard

England	v	Australia
302 (116.4 overs); James Vince 83 (170); Mitchell Starc 3/77 (28 overs)		328 (130.3 overs); Steve Smith 141* (326); Stuart Broad 3/49 (25 overs)
195 (71.4 overs); Joe Root 51 (104); Josh Hazlewood 3/46 (16 overs)		0/173 (50 overs); David Warner 87* (119)

Australia won by 10 wickets
The Gabba, Brisbane
Umpires: Aleem Dar (Pak) and Marais Erasmus (SA)
Player of the match: Steve Smith (Aus)

- England won the toss and elected to bat.
- Due to rain and bad light, 9.3 overs were lost on day 1.
- Cameron Bancroft (Aus) made his Test debut.
- Tim Paine (Aus) equalled the record for the most consecutive Test matches missed between successive appearances for Australia (78).
- Mitchell Starc (Aus) took his 150th Test wicket.
- Cameron Bancroft and David Warner (Aus) broke the record for the highest unbeaten opening stand in a successful run chase in a Test match.

=== Second Test ===
2–6 December 2017 (D/N)
Scorecard

Australia	v	England
8/442d (149 overs); Shaun Marsh 126* (231); Craig Overton 3/105 (33 overs)		227 (76.1 overs); Craig Overton 41* (79); Nathan Lyon 4/60 (24.1 overs)
138 (58 overs); Mitchell Starc 20 (25); James Anderson 5/43 (22 overs)		233 (84.2 overs); Joe Root 67 (123); Mitchell Starc 5/88 (19.2 overs)

Australia won by 120 runs
Adelaide Oval, Adelaide
Umpires: Aleem Dar (Pak) and Chris Gaffaney (NZ)
Player of the match: Shaun Marsh (Aus)

- England won the toss and elected to field.
- Due to rain, 9 overs were lost on day 1 and 18.5 overs lost on day 2.
- Craig Overton (Eng) made his Test debut and took his maiden Test wicket.

=== Third Test ===
14–18 December 2017
Scorecard

England	v	Australia
403 (115.1 overs); Dawid Malan 140 (227); Mitchell Starc 4/91 (25.1 overs)		9/662d (179.3 overs); Steve Smith 239 (399); James Anderson 4/116 (37.3 overs)
218 (72.5 overs); James Vince 55 (95); Josh Hazlewood 5/48 (18 overs)

Australia won by an innings and 41 runs
WACA Ground, Perth
Umpires: Marais Erasmus (SA) and Chris Gaffaney (NZ)
Player of the match: Steve Smith (Aus)

- England won the toss and elected to bat.
- Rain prevented play during the first session of day 5.
- Alastair Cook was the first player for England, and the eighth overall, to play 150 Tests.
- Dawid Malan (Eng) and Mitchell Marsh (Aus) both scored their first centuries in Tests.
- Australia's first innings' total was their highest score in an Ashes Test at home.
- Australia regained the Ashes as a result of this match.

=== Fourth Test ===
26–30 December 2017
Scorecard

Australia	v	England
327 (119 overs); David Warner 103 (151); Stuart Broad 4/51 (28 overs)		491 (144.1 overs); Alastair Cook 244* (409); Pat Cummins 4/117 (29.1 overs)
4/263d (124.2 overs); Steve Smith 102* (275); Joe Root 1/1 (3 overs)

Match drawn
Melbourne Cricket Ground, Melbourne
Umpires: Kumar Dharmasena (SL) and Sundaram Ravi (Ind)
Player of the match: Alastair Cook (Eng)

- Australia won the toss and elected to bat.
- Rain stopped play from 3:00 pm on Day 4.
- Tom Curran (Eng) made his Test debut and took his maiden Test wicket.
- David Warner became the joint fourth-fastest Australian to score 6,000 Test runs.
- Alastair Cook (Eng) made the highest score by a visiting player at this venue. He also made his 11th score of 150 or more – the most by an England batsman – and became the sixth highest run-scorer in Tests. His first-innings score of 244 not out was the highest score while carrying the bat in Test cricket until it was bettered by Tom Latham in December 2018.

=== Fifth Test ===
4–8 January 2018
Scorecard

England	v	Australia
346 (112.3 overs); Joe Root 83 (141); Pat Cummins 4/80 (24.3 overs)		7/649d (193 overs); Usman Khawaja 171 (381); Moeen Ali 2/170 (48 overs)
180 (88.1 overs); Joe Root 58* (167); Pat Cummins 4/39 (17 overs)

Australia won by an innings and 123 runs
Sydney Cricket Ground, Sydney
Umpires: Kumar Dharmasena (SL) and Joel Wilson (WI)
Player of the match: Pat Cummins (Aus)

- England won the toss and elected to bat.
- The toss was delayed by 130 minutes due to rain.
- Mason Crane (Eng) made his Test debut and took his maiden Test wicket.
- Jonny Bairstow (Eng) played his 50th Test.
- Steve Smith (Aus) became the joint second-fastest batsman (in terms of innings) to score 6,000 runs in Tests.
- Alastair Cook (Eng) became the youngest player to score 12,000 Test runs.
- Shaun Marsh and Mitchell Marsh became the fifth pair of brothers, and the third Australian pair, to score a century in the same innings.

== Statistics ==
As of fifth Test ending 8 January 2018

=== Leading run-scorers ===
Rank	Name	Runs	Inns.	NO	HS	Ave.	100s	50s	SR
1	(Australia) Steve Smith	687	7	2	239	137.40	3	2	48.51
2	(Australia) Shaun Marsh	445	7	1	156	74.16	2	2	45.97
3	(Australia) David Warner	441	8	1	103	63.00	1	3	52.37
4	(England) Dawid Malan	383	9	0	140	42.55	1	3	42.69
5	(England) Joe Root	378	9	1	83	47.25	0	5	49.02
Source: ESPN cricinfo

=== Leading wicket-takers ===
Rank	Name	Wkts.	Ovs.	Mdns.	Runs	Eco.	Ave.	Best.
1	(Australia) Pat Cummins	23	197.1	43	567	2.87	24.65	8/119
2	(Australia) Mitchell Starc	22	162.3	32	518	3.18	23.54	8/137
3	(Australia) Josh Hazlewood	21	190.5	49	544	2.85	25.90	8/140
4	(Australia) Nathan Lyon	21	260.1	61	614	2.36	29.23	6/105
5	(England) James Anderson	17	223.3	70	473	2.11	27.82	6/117
Source: ESPN cricinfo

== Broadcasting ==
The series was broadcast on television in Australia by the Nine Network. As part of a five-year deal with Cricket Australia that commenced in 2016, BT Sport provided television coverage of the series in the United Kingdom and Ireland.
