= Jonathan Merlo =

Australian cricketer

Personal information
- Full name: Jonathan Adam Merlo
- Born: 15 December 1998 (age 27); Melbourne, Victoria, Australia
- Batting: Right-handed
- Bowling: Right-arm medium-fast
- Role: All-rounder

Domestic team information
- Years: Team
- 2017/18: Cricket Australia XI (squad no. 12)
- 2018/19–2019/20: Melbourne Stars (squad no. 12)
- 2019/20–2024/25: Victoria (squad no. 12)
- 2021/22: Melbourne Renegades
- 2025/26: Melbourne Stars (squad no. 11)
- LA debut: 27 September 2017 CA XI v South Australia

Career statistics
Competition	FC	LA	T20
Matches	10	27	18
Runs scored	260	468	79
Batting average	15.29	23.40	7.18
100s/50s	0/1	1/2	0/0
Top score	64	101	15
Balls bowled	300	705	30
Wickets	3	23	0
Bowling average	67.33	32.60	–
5 wickets in innings	0	1	–
10 wickets in match	0	0	–
Best bowling	2/14	5/71	–
Catches/stumpings	7/–	12/–	3/–
- Source: Cricinfo, 25 January 2026

Jonathan Adam Merlo (born 15 December 1998) is an Australian cricketer. He made his List A debut for Cricket Australia XI in the 2017–18 JLT One-Day Cup on 27 September 2017.

== Career ==
In December 2017, he was named in Australia's squad for the 2018 Under-19 Cricket World Cup.

Merlo was in the Cricket Australia XI squad for the 2017–18 JLT One-Day Cup. He made his List A debut in the first match of the tournament when Cricket Australia XI won their second match in their existence against South Australia. He bowled seven overs with figures of 2/38 including a maiden over. He took his first List A wicket when he bowled Cameron Valente, who was on 100 at the time. He played four matches in the tournament and took a total of 5 wickets.

Merlo made his Twenty20 debut for Melbourne Stars in the 2018–19 Big Bash League season on 1 January 2019. He made his first-class debut on 24 February 2020, for Victoria in the 2019–20 Sheffield Shield season.

Merlo was delisted by Victoria at the end of the 2024–25 season.

== Personal life ==
In 2022, Merlo was studying for a Bachelor of Commerce at Deakin University.

He grew up in Melbourne and attended Xavier College.
