= Hilton Cartwright =

Australian cricketer (born 1992)

Personal information
- Full name: Hilton William Raymond Cartwright
- Born: 14 February 1992 (age 34); Harare, Zimbabwe
- Height: 1.88 m (6 ft 2 in)
- Batting: Right-handed
- Bowling: Right-arm medium
- Role: Middle-order batter

International information
- National side: Australia (2017)
- Test debut (cap 450): 3 January 2017 v Pakistan
- Last Test: 4 September 2017 v Bangladesh
- ODI debut (cap 221): 17 September 2017 v India
- Last ODI: 21 September 2017 v India

Domestic team information
- Years: Team
- 2012/13–: Western Australia
- 2012/13–2018/19: Perth Scorchers
- 2015/16: Cricket Australia XI
- 2018: Middlesex
- 2019/20–: Melbourne Stars
- 2022: Derbyshire
- 2022: Oval Invincibles
- 2025–2026: Hampshire

Career statistics
Competition	Test	ODI	FC	LA
Matches	2	2	109	86
Runs scored	55	2	6,126	1,814
Batting average	27.50	1.00	35.41	27.48
100s/50s	0/0	0/0	10/32	0/10
Top score	37	1	171*	99
Balls bowled	54	–	3,307	739
Wickets	0	–	60	16
Bowling average	–	–	34.93	47.31
5 wickets in innings	–	–	0	0
10 wickets in match	–	–	0	0
Best bowling	–	–	4/23	3/26
Catches/stumpings	0/–	1/–	69/–	36/–
- Source: ESPNcricinfo, 23 October 2026

Hilton William Raymond Cartwright (born 14 February 1992) is a Zimbabwean born Australian international cricketer who plays for Western Australia and the Melbourne Stars. He is a right-handed all-rounder. Cartwright made his Test debut for the Australian national team in January 2017, having earlier played for Australia A and the National Performance Squad. In January 2017 he won the Bradman Young Cricketer of the Year prize awarded by Cricket Australia.

== Early life ==
=== Zimbabwe ===
Cartwright was born in Harare, Zimbabwe. He spent his early life in Marondera, but at the age of 11 emigrated to Australia with his family after their tobacco farm was occupied.

"I don’t remember a huge amount of the bad side of Zimbabwe," said Cartwright. "I remember living on a farm. Our cousins, were down the road. It was only in the last year or so when we had to move out of our farm home and live with my mum’s side of the family in Harare was when my perspective started to change."

=== Move to Perth ===
His family settled in Perth, Western Australia, where he attended Wesley College.

After his arrival to Perth, Cartwright impressed locals with his cricket skills. Cartwright was picked for the under-13 South Perth Cricket Club district team where he had early success, averaging 34 in his first season. After three more successful seasons, he made his grade-cricket debut in third grade, scoring an unbeaten 50*.

Cartwright represented Western Australia at the 2008–09 Australian Under-17 Championships, and subsequently progressed to the state's under-23 side in the Futures League, debuting in February 2012.

Cartwright said, "When I was younger, I saw myself as a batting all-rounder, and then I started taking a few wickets and people started saying, ‘'Oh you're a bowling all-rounder'’ because I was out of form with my batting. So it was quite hard to try to keep the idea of myself as a batting all-rounder in my own mind."

At grade cricket level, he plays for the South Perth Cricket Club. Cartwright also holds British citizenship, and spent the 2010 English season playing for Sidmouth in the Devon Cricket League.

"I used to think 'I’m always going to play for Zimbabwe', but since moving to Australia I’ve actually never thought about playing for the English," said Cartwright.

== Domestic career ==
=== 2012–13 ===
After good form in a Futures League match against the Queensland Academy of Sport, recording a half-century and a five-wicket haul, Cartwright was selected to debut for Western Australia's team for the 2012–13 Ryobi One-Day Cup against Victoria at the Melbourne Cricket Ground, held on 7 November 2012. In the match, Cartwright scored four runs from seven deliveries coming in at number seven in the batting order, and took a single wicket in Victoria's innings bowling medium pace, Western Australia's only wicket of the match.

In December 2012, Cartwright was named in the Perth Scorchers' squad for the 2012–13 Big Bash League season, replacing the injured Pat Cummins. He debuted for the Scorchers in the second match of the competition, against the Melbourne Stars, and top-scored with 17 runs from Perth's innings of 69, the lowest completed score recorded in the tournament. Cartwright made his first-class debut for Western Australia in January 2013, against New South Wales in the Sheffield Shield. He scored 0 and 29 and took 0–19 off two overs.

His second first class game was unusual – he replaced Adam Voges during a game on day 4, when Voges was called up for international duty. Cartwright took 0–22.

Cartwright's next first class game was in 2013–14. Against Victoria he took 2–14 and 0–19 and scored 5 and 0.

=== 2015–16 season ===
In October 2015 Cartwright was picked in the Cricket Australia XI to play New Zealand. He won man of the match in a Matador Cup game scoring 99 for the Cricket Australia XI against Queensland. He also scored 66 against South Australia.

He was selected in the Australian National Performance Squad. He made 81 against Australia A and 65 against India A.

That summer in the Sheffield Shield Cartwright scored 59 in a game against NSW; scored 44 and took 4 wickets against Queensland; scored 139 and took 2 wickets against South Australia; and scored 92 against Queensland.

Cartwright was picked to play for Australia A against a touring India A side in 2016. He scored 117 and took a wicket, winning the man of the match.

=== 2016–17 season ===
Cartwright began the 2016–17 Sheffield Shield competition strongly, scoring 80 against South Australia, 59 against NSW and 84 and 41 (and one wicket) against Qld.

In April 2022, he was bought by the Oval Invincibles for the 2022 season of The Hundred in England.

== International career ==
In November 2016, Cartwright was added to Australia's One Day International (ODI) squad ahead of their three-match series against New Zealand, despite the fact his domestic one day performances for WA had been relatively underwhelming. ""Hilton bowls useful aggressive medium-pace and is a very good striker of the ball," said Trevor Hohns. "He is an exciting young prospect for Australian cricket and we have been watching him at the pathway level for some time now."

In December 2016 he was added to Australia's Test squad ahead of the Boxing day match against Pakistan.

Trevor Hohns, chairman of selectors, said, "We wanted a batting allrounder, someone to bowl seam-up and capable of batting in the top six as well, and after considering several names we came to the conclusion that Hilton fits that bill. We have seen plenty of him, he has performed well this season and we believe that if called upon he will do an excellent job."

On 3 January 2017 Cartwright was presented his baggy green cap by former Australian cricketer Tom Moody to make his debut in third Test match against Pakistan, replacing Nic Maddinson. Cartwright averaged over 44.50 with the bat and had taken 15 wickets from 16 games at 44. Captain Steve Smith said Cartwright's bowling had "improved a lot over the last year or so. I remember facing him a little while ago and I think since then he's probably gained 10ks and got a lot more consistent with his areas. I think he's improved a lot. I guess it depends how much we'll use him, how the game goes. But he's certainly improved over the last year."

In the test Cartwright scored 37 off 97 balls (including a four off his first ball) and took 0–15 off four overs. Australia won the game. According to one report "Cartwright's balls were sluggish, and not just after he was struck a low blow at short leg. He delivered only four overs in this Test and barely broke the 125 km/h barrier. It is hard to imagine him worrying batsmen at that pace. Marsh and Shane Watson at their quickest have both operated above 140 km/h."

Cartwright was overlooked for Australia's squad to tour India in favour of Shaun Marsh and Mitchell Marsh. However, in January 2017 he was voted the Bradman Young Cricketer of the Year.

He finished the rest of the season strongly at domestic level. He made 94 and 27 against Tasmania, winning the man of the match. He scored 101 against Victoria and a man of the match winning 70 and 170 not out against New South Wales.

Cartwright was offered a Cricket Australia contract for 2017–18.

=== 2017 Tour of Bangladesh ===
Cartwright was picked on the 2017 tour of Bangladesh, replacing Shaun Marsh. Head selector Trevor Hohns said, "Hilton averages nearly 60 [52.07] runs in first-class cricket and was the second highest run-scorer in the Sheffield Shield last season with 861 runs. He is a quality player who we believe has a big future for Australia and we are very keen to see him carry on his good form in the sub-continent."

He did not play in the first test but was picked in the second test in place of Usman Khawaja. Australia had decided to play three spinners – Ashton Agar, Steve O'Keefe and Nathan Lyon – and it was felt that Cartwright's bowling would give Steve Smith an extra pace option.

Cartwright was only used for five overs in Bangladesh's first innings, taking 0–16. He scored 18 in Australia's first innings.

=== 2017 India tour ===
Cartwright was named in the Australian one day squad to tour India in 2017.

He made a duck playing as opener in a tour game against the Indian Board XI.

He made his One Day International (ODI) debut for Australia against India on 17 September 2017. He scored 1, while opening with David Warner. In the second ODI he scored 1. Cartwright was dropped for the rest of the series.

== 2017–18 summer ==
Cartwright was part of the West Australian side that won the JLT One Day Competition in 2017. Against Tasmania he took 1–13; against Queensland 0–29; South Australia he took 0–26 and scored 5; he made 34 against the Cricket Australia XI; and he made 15 not out in the final.

He had a poor 2017–18 Sheffield Shield, although he ended the seasons strong with a man of the match performance against SA, scoring 83 and 111 not out.

In the BBL, his highlight was a man of the match 58 off 53 balls against the Stars.

=== 2018: Playing for Middlesex ===
Cartwright signed to play for the English county Middlesex over the 2018 summer. Middlesex signed in him in part due to conversations with former Middlesex teammates Adam Voges and Justin Langer.

Highlights of Cartwright's season include 4–33 against Glamorgan. However, after five first class games he had scored 78 runs at an average of 9.75.

=== 2025: Playing for Hampshire ===
In July 2025, Cartwright signed for Hampshire County Cricket Club to play in the final six matches of the group stages of that season's T20 Blast. In January 2026, he agreed a deal to rejoin the club to play in that year's T20 Blast.
