= Ben Dunk =

Australian cricketer

Personal information
- Full name: Ben Robert Dunk
- Born: 11 March 1987 (age 39); Innisfail, Queensland, Australia
- Batting: Left-handed
- Bowling: Right-arm off break
- Role: Wicket-keeper-batter

International information
- National side: Australia (2014–2017)
- T20I debut (cap 72): 5 November 2014 v South Africa
- Last T20I: 22 February 2017 v Sri Lanka
- T20I shirt no.: 51

Domestic team information
- Years: Team
- 2009/10–2011/12: Queensland
- 2011/12: Sydney Thunder
- 2012/13–2017/18: Tasmania
- 2013/14–2015/16: Hobart Hurricanes
- 2014: Mumbai Indians
- 2014: Antigua Hawksbills
- 2016/17: Adelaide Strikers
- 2017/18–2020/21: Melbourne Stars
- 2019: Karachi Kings
- 2019: Nelson Mandela Bay Giants
- 2020–2022: Lahore Qalandars
- 2020: St Kitts & Nevis Patriots
- 2021: Galle Gladiators

Career statistics
Competition	T20I	FC	LA	T20
Matches	5	43	44	171
Runs scored	99	2,303	1,347	3,536
Batting average	19.80	30.30	33.67	24.05
100s/50s	0/0	4/11	3/6	0/18
Top score	32	190	229*	99*
Balls bowled	–	198	104	76
Wickets	–	4	5	3
Bowling average	–	42.25	15.40	39.33
5 wickets in innings	–	0	0	0
10 wickets in match	–	0	0	0
Best bowling	–	1/4	3/14	1/19
Catches/stumpings	5/2	43/0	28/3	97/10
- Source: ESPNcricinfo, 3 February 2022

Ben Robert Dunk (born 11 March 1987) is an Australian professional cricketer who is currently playing and is the power hitting coach for the Lahore Qalandars. Previously, he has played for Melbourne Stars in the BBL, and he has also played for Queensland and Tasmania in Australian domestic cricket as a left-handed batsman. He can also play as a wicket-keeper and is a capable bowler, bowling right arm off spin.

He made his Twenty20 International debut for Australia against South Africa on 5 November 2014.

== Early career ==
Born in the northern Queensland town of Innisfail, Dunk moved to Brisbane early in his career to broaden his cricketing opportunities. He participated in a specialist cricket program at Mitchelton State High School before winning a Rugby and Cricket scholarship to Brisbane Grammar School. He played for the Northern Suburbs District Cricket Club in Queensland's grade cricket competition and represented Queensland in youth representative teams. He was also in the Australian squad for the 2005 World Youth Cup.

== Domestic and T20 franchise career ==
Dunk made his debut for Queensland in December 2009, having been selected in the Twenty20 team. 2009-10 was a breakout season for Dunk, playing 9 games, highlighted by an innings of 70 not out off 40 balls. He made his Sheffield Shield debut for Queensland in October 2010, playing as a specialist batsman (Chris Hartley retained selection as Queensland's wicket-keeper).

In 2012, Dunk moved to the Tasmanian Tigers. On 18 October 2014 he scored an unbeaten 229 against Queensland in the domestic one-day competition, surpassing David Warner's 197 and became the first one-day double century in Australian Domestic cricket.

In 2018, Dunk was drafted by Vancouver Knights for the inaugural season of GT20

Dunk has been the top run-scorer in a Big Bash League season twice and has played for four of the eight franchises, most recently for the Melbourne Stars. In the Pakistan Super League he has played for both Karachi Kings and Lahore Qalandars and in the Indian Premier League for Mumbai Indians.

In July 2020, he was named in the St Kitts & Nevis Patriots squad for the 2020 Caribbean Premier League.

In January- February 2022, Ben Dunk again played for Lahore Qalandars, but then got offered the position as power-hitting coach.
