= Evan Gulbis =

Australian cricketer

Personal information
- Full name: Evan Peter Gulbis
- Born: 26 March 1986 (age 40); Melbourne, Victoria, Australia
- Batting: Right-handed
- Bowling: Right-arm medium
- Role: All-rounder

Domestic team information
- Years: Team
- 2010/11: Victoria
- 2011/12–2015/16: Tasmania
- 2012/13–2014/15: Hobart Hurricanes
- 2015/16–2018/19: Melbourne Stars
- 2016/17: Victoria
- 2016/17: Wellington

Career statistics
Competition	FC	LA	T20
Matches	21	33	52
Runs scored	726	636	475
Batting average	24.20	27.65	19.00
100s/50s	1/2	0/4	0/1
Top score	229	63	61*
Balls bowled	3,412	1,135	564
Wickets	59	36	20
Bowling average	31.59	25.77	38.95
5 wickets in innings	1	0	0
10 wickets in match	0	0	0
Best bowling	5/104	4/8	3/29
Catches/stumpings	10/–	11/–	19/–
- Source: Cricinfo, 13 May 2022

Evan Gulbis (born 26 March 1986) is an Australian cricketer who most recently played for the Victorian cricket team in Australian domestic cricket competitions. Originally from Williamstown, Gulbis made his debut for Victoria in a Twenty20 match against New South Wales at the Melbourne Cricket Ground on 22 January 2011.

He played as an overseas professional for Macclesfield CC in the ECB Cheshire Premier League in 2006 and 2007.

After playing a number of limited overs and T20 games for Victoria in the 2010–11 session, Gulbis was picked up for a regular position in the Tasmanian side, making his first class debut for Tasmania against his former home state in November 2011. After that, he spent several years in the Tasmanian side filling the all rounder position in the team and on 13 March 2014, Gulbis made 229 playing for Tasmania against South Australia. This is the second highest first class score for a number 8 batsman. Despite some success, Tasmania eventually cut Gulbis from their line up for the 2016–17 season, and he was later brought into the Victorian team for the Matador Cup limited overs competition.

In the 2016–17 season, Gulbis was signed to the Wellington side in New Zealand's domestic T20 tournament.

Gulbis plays for Carlton in Victorian Premier Cricket, commuting weekly from his home in Launceston to play, and has captained the club to three premierships: in 2018–19, when he scored 148* in the final to win the John Scholes Medal and chase Geelong's first innings total of 9/409; and against Casey–South Melbourne in both 2021–22 and 2023–24 – the latter of which saw Carlton 171 & 3/253 defeat Casey–South Melbourne 212 & 209 after completing fourth innings chase in 30.4 of the 36 available overs, for the first reverse outright victory in the final by any club since 1953–54.
