= Jackson Coleman =

Australian cricketer (born 1991)

Personal information
- Full name: Jackson Ray Coleman
- Born: 18 December 1991 (age 34)
- Batting: Right-handed
- Bowling: Left-arm fast-medium
- Role: Bowler

Domestic team information
- Years: Team
- 2016–present: Victoria
- 2017–present: Cricket Australia XI (squad no. 10)
- 2017-2019: Melbourne Stars (squad no. 9)
- 2019-present: Perth Scorchers (squad no. 9)
- List A debut: 5 October 2016 Victoria v South Australia

Career statistics
Competition	FC	LA	T20
Matches	2	18	10
Runs scored	25	57	–
Batting average	–	14.25	–
100s/50s	0/0	0/0	–/–
Top score	17*	17	–
Balls bowled	262	826	152
Wickets	5	27	11
Bowling average	36.80	27.51	16.54
5 wickets in innings	0	1	0
10 wickets in match	0	0	0
Best bowling	3/72	5/39	3/16
Catches/stumpings	1/–	2/–	0/–
- Source: ESPNcricinfo, 21 January 2020

Jackson Coleman (born 18 December 1991) is an Australian cricketer. He made his List A debut for Victoria in the 2016–17 Matador BBQs One-Day Cup on 5 October 2016. Prior to his debut, he was part of Australia's squad for the 2010 Under-19 Cricket World Cup. In 2017, he represented Cricket Australia XI in the 2017–18 JLT One-Day Cup.

== Domestic career ==
Coleman was in the Cricket Australia XI squad for the 2017–18 JLT One-Day Cup. In his first match for the team, he took four wickets against South Australia to cause major problems for the Redbacks' top order, which allowed Cricket Australia XI to register just the second win in their history. Though he only took one other wicket over the course of the tournament, he bowled consistently and only conceded 4.60 runs per over.

He made his first-class debut for Cricket Australia XI against England on 8 November 2017. He made his Twenty20 debut for Melbourne Stars in the 2017–18 Big Bash League season on 6 January 2018.

== Personal life ==
Coleman is the son of former VFL/AFL footballer Glenn Coleman.
