= Simon Milenko =

Australian cricketer (born 1988)

Personal information
- Born: 24 November 1988 (age 37); Sydney, Australia
- Batting: Right-handed
- Bowling: Right-arm medium
- Role: All-rounder

Domestic team information
- Years: Team
- 2014/15–2015/16: Queensland
- 2015/16–2018/19: Hobart Hurricanes
- 2016/17–: Tasmania
- 2020/21: Brisbane Heat

Career statistics
Competition	FC	LA	T20
Matches	29	27	42
Runs scored	1,221	510	333
Batting average	27.13	28.33	15.13
100s/50s	1/10	0/3	0/1
Top score	100	57*	66*
Balls bowled	3,881	848	123
Wickets	68	21	9
Bowling average	30.73	41.00	23.00
5 wickets in innings	3	0	0
10 wickets in match	0	0	0
Best bowling	5/15	4/80	3/25
Catches/stumpings	13/–	9/–	13/–
- Source: Cricinfo, 21 March 2021

Simon Milenko (born 24 November 1988) is an Australian cricketer. He plays for Tasmania and the Hobart Hurricanes. After making his first class debut for Queensland in 2014–15, he did not play any Sheffield Shield games for them in the 2015–16 season, so he moved to Tasmania to pursue further opportunities. On 7 December 2019, in the 2019–20 Sheffield Shield season, Milenko scored his maiden century in first-class cricket.
