= Jackson Bird =

Australian cricketer

Personal information
- Full name: Jackson Munro Bird
- Born: 11 December 1986 (age 39); Sydney, New South Wales
- Nickname: Squid
- Height: 1.95 m (6 ft 5 in)
- Batting: Right-handed
- Bowling: Right-arm fast-medium
- Role: Bowler

International information
- National side: Australia (2012–2017)
- Test debut (cap 431): 26 December 2012 v Sri Lanka
- Last Test: 26 December 2017 v England

Domestic team information
- Years: Team
- 2011/12–2022/23: Tasmania
- 2011/12–2014/15: Melbourne Stars
- 2015: Hampshire
- 2015/16–2017/18: Sydney Sixers
- 2016: Nottinghamshire
- 2018/19: Melbourne Stars
- 2019/20–present: Sydney Sixers
- 2022: Kent
- 2023/24–2024/25: New South Wales
- 2025: Hobart Hurricanes
- 2025/26: Tasmania

Career statistics
Competition	Test	FC	LA	T20
Matches	9	137	48	96
Runs scored	43	1,780	185	107
Batting average	14.33	11.55	13.21	8.91
100s/50s	0/0	0/4	0/0	0/0
Top score	19*	64	28*	14*
Balls bowled	1,934	27,380	2,602	1,881
Wickets	34	535	59	89
Bowling average	30.64	24.96	34.40	26.71
5 wickets in innings	1	20	1	0
10 wickets in match	0	6	0	0
Best bowling	5/59	7/18	6/25	4/16
Catches/stumpings	2/–	77/–	20/–	40/–
- Source: ESPNcricinfo, 26 July 2026

Jackson Munro Bird (born 11 December 1986) is an Australian international cricketer. He has played for Australia in the past and currently plays first-class cricket for Tasmania. Bird is a fast-medium bowler. He is originally from Sydney and was educated at Saint Ignatius' College, Riverview and St Pius X College, Chatswood. Bird left the Manly club to further his career with the Tasmanian Tigers in the 2011–2012 season.

== Early career ==
In March 2012, Bird took a hat-trick against Western Australia at the Bellerive Oval. He finished with match figures of 11/95 and helped Tasmania to a spot in the Sheffield Shield final.

== Domestic career ==
After 10 Sheffield Shield matches, Bird had taken 62 wickets. These came at an average of 17.30 and a strike rate of 36.1 – which was the best in the competition's 120-year history at that point.

Bird does not bowl express pace but his ability to swing the ball both ways has proven very successful in domestic cricket. He plays in the Big Bash League for the Sydney Sixers.

In March 2018, Cricket Australia named Bird in their Sheffield Shield team of the year.

== International career ==
Bird was picked in the Australian Test Squad prior to the 2012 Boxing Day Test against Sri Lanka at the MCG, while Mitchell Starc was rested. Prior to the commencement of the Test, Bird was presented with a Baggy green, making him the 431st person to play Test Cricket for Australia. Opening the bowling, he took the first wicket of the game removing Dimuth Karunaratne with his tenth delivery and took a total of two wickets in the first innings. Bird took two wickets in the first session of Sri Lanka's second innings. In the following test in Sydney, Bird was named man of the match after taking 7 wickets across two innings. Bird was picked in the Australian One Day squad for the first time on 19 January prior to the match against Sri Lanka at the Sydney Cricket Ground.

In January 2017, Bird played as a substitute fielder in the third Test against Pakistan and took four catches during the match, two in each of Pakistan's innings. This equalled Younis Khan's record of four catches as a substitute fielder in a Test.
