= 2020–21 Sheffield Shield season =

Cricket tournament

2020–21 Sheffield Shield
- Dates: 10 October 2020 – 19 April 2021
- Administrator: Cricket Australia
- Cricket format: First-class
- Tournament format(s): Double round-robin and final
- Champions: Queensland (9th title)
- Participants: 6
- Matches: 25
- Player of the series: Nathan Lyon (New South Wales)
- Most runs: Cameron Green (Western Australia) (922)
- Most wickets: Nathan Lyon (New South Wales) (42)

The 2020–21 Sheffield Shield season was the 119th season of the Sheffield Shield, the Australian domestic first-class cricket competition. On 26 June 2020, Cricket Australia confirmed all the squads for the 2020–21 domestic cricket season. Cricket Australia also confirmed that the tournament would use the Kookaburra ball for all the matches, after using the Duke ball since the 2016–17 season. New South Wales were the defending champions.

Due to the COVID-19 pandemic, the first four rounds of the season are being played at four venues in Adelaide. With further restrictions due to the pandemic in Australia, the first round match between New South Wales and Victoria was scheduled to take place from 17 November 2020, because of extra measures for people travelling into South Australia from Victoria. However, on 12 October 2020, Victoria's first two matches were postponed due to the extra quarantine restrictions.

Round three of the tournament saw a new record partnership set in a Sheffield Shield match. Marcus Harris and Will Pucovski of Victoria scored 486 runs for the first wicket, in the match against South Australia. The previous record was held by Mark and Steve Waugh, making 464 for New South Wales against Western Australia in the 1990–91 tournament.

On 16 December 2020, Cricket Australia confirmed the remaining schedule of the tournament, when the tournament was shortened by one round. On 10 February 2021, the tournament was shortened further by one round, with the final starting on 15 April 2021. Queensland won the tournament, beating New South Wales by an innings and 33 runs in the final.

== Points table ==
Team	Pld	W	L	D	MA	BP	Pts
Queensland	8	3	1	3	1	11.17	33.17
New South Wales	8	3	2	3	0	10.51	31.51
Western Australia	8	2	1	5	0	11.37	28.37
Tasmania	8	2	3	3	0	13.11	28.11
Victoria	8	1	1	6	0	9.76	21.76
South Australia	8	0	3	4	1	7.82	12.82

== Round-Robin stage ==
=== Round 1 ===
10–13 October 2020
Scorecard

Western Australia	v	South Australia (H)
5/481d (129 overs); Josh Inglis 153* (182); Lloyd Pope 5/164 (27 overs)		314 (114 overs); Jake Weatherald 105 (160); Ashton Agar 5/103 (33 overs)
2/215d (45 overs); Shaun Marsh 110* (111); Chadd Sayers 2/56 (11 overs)		177 (82.3 overs); Travis Head 54 (105); Joel Paris 2/10 (10.3 overs)

Western Australia won by 205 runs
Karen Rolton Oval, Adelaide
Umpires: Michael Graham-Smith and Donovan Koch
Player of the match: Ashton Agar (Western Australia)

- Western Australia won the toss and elected to bat.
- Lance Morris (Western Australia) made his first-class debut.
- Lloyd Pope (South Australia) became the first leg spinner in 50 years to take a five-wicket haul on the opening day of a Sheffield Shield season.
- Josh Inglis (Western Australia) scored his maiden first-class century.
- Ashton Agar (Western Australia) became the 28th player to score a century and take a five-wicket haul in the same Sheffield Shield match.

10–13 October 2020
Scorecard

Tasmania	v	Queensland
250 (85.3 overs); Ben McDermott 74 (156); Michael Neser 5/32 (17 overs)		529 (156.3 overs); Marnus Labuschagne 167 (230); Nathan Ellis 3/99 (32 overs)
210 (129.2 overs); Jordan Silk 56 (201); Mitchell Swepson 4/66 (45.2 overs)

Queensland won by an innings and 59 runs
Park 25, Adelaide
Umpires: Bruce Oxenford and Darren Close
Player of the match: Michael Neser (Queensland)

- Tasmania won the toss and elected to bat.
- Park 25 hosted its maiden first-class cricket match.
- Michael Neser (Queensland) scored his maiden first-class century. Neser also became the 27th player to score a century and take a five-wicket haul in the same Sheffield Shield match.

17–20 November 2020

New South Wales	v	Victoria

- The match was postponed due to COVID-19 quarantine restrictions.

=== Round 2 ===
19–22 October 2020
Scorecard

South Australia	v	Tasmania
195 (82.4 overs); Harry Nielsen 64 (164); Beau Webster 3/26 (12 overs)		8/493d (158 overs); Jake Doran 112 (229); Chadd Sayers 3/27 (29 overs)
5/347 (128 overs); Travis Head 171* (256); Jackson Bird 2/53 (23 overs)

Match drawn
Karen Rolton Oval, Adelaide
Umpires: Gerard Abood and Sam Nogajski
Player of the match: Travis Head (South Australia)

- South Australia won the toss and elected to bat.

19–22 October 2020
Scorecard

New South Wales	v	Western Australia
6/443d (141 overs); Moises Henriques 167 (276); Ashton Agar 2/106 (40 overs)		534 (167.5 overs); Cameron Green 197 (438); Sean Abbott 6/89 (32.5 overs)
2/107 (34 overs); Kurtis Patterson 48 (79); Cameron Gannon 1/22 (9 overs)

Match drawn
Park 25, Adelaide
Umpires: Paul Wilson and Darren Close
Player of the match: Sean Abbott (New South Wales)

- Western Australia won the toss and elected to field.

22–25 October 2020

Victoria	v	New South Wales

Adelaide Oval No. 2, Adelaide

- The match was postponed due to COVID-19 quarantine restrictions.

=== Round 3 ===
30 October–2 November 2020
Scorecard

Western Australia	v	Tasmania
302 (89.1 overs); Shaun Marsh 115 (242); Nathan Ellis 4/76 (17.1 overs)		432 (128.3 overs); Ben McDermott 90 (220); Lance Morris 5/94 (20.3 overs)
5/436d (100 overs); Sam Whiteman 118 (192); Nathan Ellis 2/108 (121)		2/117 (48 overs); Matthew Wade 57* (143); Matthew Kelly 1/10 (7 overs)

Match drawn
Park 25, Adelaide
Umpires: Phillip Gillespie and Gerard Abood
Player of the match: Shaun Marsh (Western Australia)

- Tasmania won the toss and elected to field.
- Shaun Marsh (Western Australia) scored his 30th century in first-class cricket.
- Lance Morris (Western Australia) took his maiden first-class five-wicket haul.

30 October–2 November 2020
Scorecard

South Australia	v	Victoria
200 (80 overs); Henry Hunt 50 (108); Will Sutherland 3/26 (16 overs)		3/564d (139.1 overs); Will Pucovski 255* (386); Travis Head 1/53 (10.1 overs)
8/384 (160 overs); Travis Head 151 (296); Scott Boland 6/61 (33 overs)

Match drawn
ACH Group Stadium, Glenelg
Umpires: Rod Tucker and Shawn Craig
Player of the match: Will Pucovski (Victoria)

- South Australia won the toss and elected to bat.
- Zak Evans and Mitchell Perry (Victoria) both made their first-class debuts.
- Marcus Harris and Will Pucovski (Victoria) made the highest ever partnership in Sheffield Shield history, scoring 486 runs for the first wicket. The previous record was held by Mark and Steve Waugh, making 464 for New South Wales against Western Australia in the 1990–91 tournament.

30 October–2 November 2020
Scorecard

Queensland	v	New South Wales
298 (97.2 overs); Marnus Labuschagne 117 (203); Mitchell Starc 4/76 (24 overs)		283 (81.1 overs); Sean Abbott 66 (77); Mitchell Swepson 5/97 (23 overs)
190 (63.5 overs); Matt Renshaw 42 (115); Trent Copeland 5/17 (18 overs)		9/206 (78.3 overs); Daniel Solway 52 (129); Mitchell Swepson 5/74 (29 overs)

New South Wales won by 1 wicket
Karen Rolton Oval, Adelaide
Umpires: Sam Nogajski and Donovan Koch
Player of the match: Mitchell Swepson (Queensland)

- New South Wales won the toss and elected to field.

=== Round 4 ===
8–11 November 2020
Scorecard

Victoria	v	Western Australia
4/414d (119 overs); Will Pucovski 202 (348); Matthew Kelly 3/84 (27 overs)		479 (139.1 overs); Shaun Marsh 135 (271); Jon Holland 4/115 (42.1 overs)
4/199 (86 overs); Marcus Harris 45 (150); Aaron Hardie 2/19 (11 overs)

Match drawn
Karen Rolton Oval, Adelaide
Umpires: Gerard Abood and Sam Nogajski
Player of the match: Will Pucovski (Victoria)

- Western Australia won the toss and elected to field.

8–11 November 2020
Scorecard

New South Wales	v	Tasmania
64 (30.3 overs); Mitchell Starc 18 (22); Jackson Bird 4/14 (10.3 overs)		239 (94.1 overs); Jordan Silk 106 (264); Sean Abbott 4/33 (21.1 overs)
6/522d (139 overs); Nick Larkin 161 (292); Jackson Bird 2/84 (29 overs)		202 (80.5 overs); Matthew Wade 59 (156); Nathan Lyon 3/60 (25 overs)

New South Wales won by 145 runs
Park 25, Adelaide
Umpires: Bruce Oxenford and Shawn Craig
Player of the match: Sean Abbott (New South Wales)

- Tasmania won the toss and elected to field.
- New South Wales made their third-lowest total in the Sheffield Shield.
- Sean Abbott (New South Wales) scored his maiden century in first-class cricket.

8–11 November 2020
Scorecard

Queensland	v	South Australia
5/496d (124 overs); Matt Renshaw 168* (230); Chadd Sayers 2/98 (29 overs)		154 (64.4 overs); Will Bosisto 38 (139); Mitchell Swepson 5/55 (25 overs)
3/105d (26 overs); Usman Khawaja 46* (46); Will Bosisto 2/45 (8 overs)		385 (158 overs); Harry Nielsen 114 (260); Mark Steketee 4/43 (28 overs)

Queensland won by 62 runs
ACH Group Stadium, Glenelg
Umpires: Rod Tucker and Phillip Gillespie
Player of the match: Mitchell Swepson (Queensland)

- Queensland won the toss and elected to bat.
- Jimmy Peirson (Queensland) scored his maiden century in first-class cricket.
- Callum Ferguson (South Australia) played in his final first-class cricket match.

=== Round 5 ===
17–20 February 2021
Scorecard

New South Wales	v	Victoria
165 (80.3 overs); Moises Henriques 67 (170); Mitchell Perry 3/25 (17 overs)		200 (74 overs); Nic Maddinson 77 (80); Nathan Lyon 6/21 (16 overs)
175 (50 overs); Sean Abbott 73 (75); Scott Boland 4/57 (16 overs)		6/143 (57.1 overs); Nic Maddinson 44 (77); Nathan Lyon 4/57 (28.1 overs)

Victoria won by 4 wickets
Sydney Cricket Ground, Sydney
Umpires: Rod Tucker and Tony Wilds
Player of the match: Nic Maddinson (Victoria)

- Victoria won the toss and elected to field.
- Nathan Lyon (New South Wales) took his 600th first-class wicket.

17–20 February 2021
Scorecard

Tasmania	v	Queensland
332 (101.1 overs); Caleb Jewell 140 (236); Brendan Doggett 4/88 (23.1 overs)		275 (77.4 overs); Joe Burns 171 (217); Beau Webster 4/50 (15.4 overs)
252 (76.4 overs); Jake Doran 55 (121); Xavier Bartlett 4/59 (19 overs)		7/310 (97.4 overs); Usman Khawaja 115* (206); Nathan Ellis 2/58 (19 overs)

Queensland won by 3 wickets
Blundstone Arena, Hobart
Umpires: Bruce Oxenford and Darren Close
Player of the match: Joe Burns (Queensland)

- Queensland won the toss and elected to field.
- Matthew Kuhnemann (Queensland) made his first-class debut.
- Caleb Jewell (Tasmania) scored his maiden first-class century.

25–28 February 2021
Scorecard

South Australia	v	Western Australia (H)
8/510d (124.5 overs); Travis Head 223 (245); Cameron Green 3/119 (28 overs)		5/409d (117 overs); Cameron Green 168* (298); Wes Agar 2/80 (22 overs)
9/230d (56 overs); Alex Carey 82* (112); Liam O'Connor 3/53 (11 overs)		9/148 (75 overs); Shaun Marsh 45 (95); Daniel Worrall 4/30 (20 overs)

Match drawn
WACA Ground, Perth
Umpires: Donovan Koch and Nathan Johnstone
Player of the match: Travis Head (South Australia)

- South Australia won the toss and elected to bat.
- Travis Head (South Australia) scored his maiden double century in first-class cricket.

25–28 February 2021
Scorecard

Victoria	v	New South Wales
190 (67.1 overs); Matthew Short 94 (184); Harry Conway 6/39 (15.1 overs)		364 (114.1 overs); Moises Henriques 141 (202); James Pattinson 4/60 (26 overs)
4/270 (129 overs); Peter Handscomb 124* (327); Nathan Lyon 2/64 (40 overs)

Match drawn
Bankstown Oval, Sydney
Umpires: Greg Davidson and Shawn Craig
Player of the match: Moises Henriques (New South Wales)

- New South Wales won the toss and elected to field.

=== Round 6 ===
5–8 March 2021
Scorecard

Tasmania	v	Victoria (H)
188 (66.1 overs); Jake Doran 52 (99); Scott Boland 4/44 (17.1 overs)		199 (84.5 overs); Peter Handscomb 73 (115); Jackson Bird 4/43 (22.5 overs)
263 (127.3 overs); Jake Doran 98 (237); James Pattinson 3/54 (26 overs)		1/122 (37.2 overs); Peter Handscomb 54* (68); Peter Siddle 1/16 (9 overs)

Match drawn
Melbourne Cricket Ground, Melbourne
Umpires: Phillip Gillespie and Simon Lightbody
Player of the match: Jake Doran (Tasmania)

- Victoria won the toss and elected to field.

6–9 March 2021
Scorecard

South Australia	v	New South Wales
8/428d (132 overs); Alex Carey 125 (214); Nathan Lyon 5/152 (45 overs)		7/366d (122 overs); Kurtis Patterson 102 (184); David Grant 2/81 (26 overs)
6/178d (54 overs); Travis Head 44 (76); Nathan Lyon 2/44 (21 overs)		4/298 (70.1 overs); Sean Abbott 83 (102); Travis Head 1/29 (8 overs)

New South Wales won by 6 wickets
Adelaide Oval, Adelaide
Umpires: Ben Treloar and Michael Graham-Smith
Player of the match: Sean Abbott (New South Wales)

- South Australia won the toss and elected to bat.
- Joe Medew-Ewen (South Australia) made his first-class debut.

6–9 March 2021
Scorecard

Western Australia	v	Queensland (H)
5/458d (124 overs); Cameron Green 251 (343); Jack Wildermuth 2/60 (20 overs)		9/600d (179.5 overs); Matt Renshaw 139 (230); Jake Carder 3/134 (31.5 overs)
4/178 (58 overs); Jake Carder 57* (115); Jack Wildermuth 2/30 (9 overs)

Match drawn
The Gabba, Brisbane
Umpires: Gerard Abood and Tony Wilds
Player of the match: Cameron Green (Western Australia)

- Queensland won the toss and elected to field.
- Cameron Green (Western Australia) scored his maiden double century in first-class cricket.

=== Round 7 ===
15–18 March 2021
Scorecard

Victoria	v	Queensland
7/219 (76 overs); Marcus Harris 113* (230); Jack Wildermuth 2/41 (10 overs)

Match drawn
Allan Border Field, Brisbane
Umpires: Donovan Koch and Rod Tucker
Player of the match: Marcus Harris (Victoria)

- Queensland won the toss and elected to field.
- No play was possible on days 3 and 4 due to rain.

20–23 March 2021
Scorecard

Tasmania	v	New South Wales
333 (107.1 overs); Tim Paine 87 (159); Harry Conway 3/80 (22.1 overs)		32 (19.3 overs); Peter Nevill 10* (30); Jackson Bird 7/18 (10 overs)
191 (56.2 overs); Tim Paine 40* (80); Nathan Lyon 4/48 (17 overs)		194 (64.3 overs); Trent Copeland 58 (60); Peter Siddle 3/31 (15 overs)

Tasmania won by 298 runs
Blundstone Arena, Hobart
Umpires: Darren Close and Sam Nogajski
Player of the match: Jackson Bird (Tasmania)

- New South Wales won the toss and elected to field.

23–26 March 2021
Scorecard

Queensland	v	South Australia

Match abandoned
Ian Healy Oval, Brisbane
Umpires: Greg Davidson and Paul Reiffel

- No toss.
- No play was possible on day 1 due to rain.
- No play was possible on days 2, 3 and 4 due to a wet outfield.

25–28 March 2021
Scorecard

Western Australia	v	Victoria
9/391d (119 overs); Josh Inglis 115 (159); Will Sutherland 4/81 (26 overs)		207 (74.2 overs); Travis Dean 38 (82); Matthew Kelly 4/43 (19 overs)
5/269d (64 overs); Sam Whiteman 104 (162); Jon Holland 2/60 (10 overs)		206 (64.3 overs); Matthew Short 37 (56); Joel Paris 5/33 (18 overs)

Western Australia won by 247 runs
WACA Ground, Perth
Umpires: Bruce Oxenford and Paul Wilson
Player of the match: Joel Paris (Western Australia)

- Victoria won the toss and elected to field.
- Joel Paris (Western Australia) scored his maiden century in first-class cricket.

=== Round 8 ===
3–6 April 2021
Scorecard

South Australia	v	Victoria
333 (118.1 overs); Travis Head 76 (164); Jon Holland 5/82 (33.1 overs)		365 (112.3 overs); Sam Harper 106* (167); Daniel Worrall 3/86 (25 overs)
9/329 (105 overs); Henry Hunt 127 (253); Jon Holland 4/90 (31 overs)

Match drawn
Junction Oval, St Kilda
Umpires: Phillip Gillespie and Sam Nogajski
Player of the match: Jon Holland (Victoria)

- South Australia won the toss and elected to bat.
- Todd Murphy, James Seymour (Victoria) and Samuel Kerber (South Australia) all made their first-class debuts.

3–6 April 2021
Scorecard

New South Wales	v	Queensland
381 (124.2 overs); Jason Sangha 103 (202); Brendan Doggett 4/79 (25 overs)		433 (138.2 overs); Marnus Labuschagne 112 (212); Nathan Lyon 6/128 (20 overs)
5/145 (56.2 overs); Matthew Gilkes 66 (135); Mitchell Swepson 4/60 (25 overs)

Match drawn
North Dalton Park, Wollongong
Umpires: Gerard Abood and Paul Wilson
Player of the match: Nathan Lyon (New South Wales)

- Queensland won the toss and elected to field.
- Lachlan Hearne (New South Wales) made his first-class debut.

3–6 April 2021
Scorecard

Tasmania	v	Western Australia
514 (160 overs); Beau Webster 135* (185); Mitchell Marsh 3/84 (22 overs)		219 (75.1 overs); Cameron Bancroft 57 (124); Jarrod Freeman 4/72 (19.1 overs)
6/184d (34.4 overs); Jordan Silk 46 (72); Cameron Gannon 3/66 (12 overs)		304 (81.3 overs); Josh Inglis 54 (38); Sam Rainbird 4/67 (16.3 overs)

Tasmania won by 175 runs
WACA Ground, Perth
Umpires: Shawn Craig and Michael Graham-Smith
Player of the match: Beau Webster (Tasmania)

- Western Australia won the toss and elected to field.
- Tim Ward (Tasmania) made his first-class debut.

== Final ==
15–19 April 2021
Scorecard

New South Wales	v	Queensland (H)
143 (62.2 overs); Kurtis Patterson 43 (128); Michael Neser 5/27 (13.2 overs)		389 (149.3 overs); Marnus Labuschagne 192 (353); Sean Abbott 4/71 (28.3 overs)
213 (82.1 overs); Daniel Hughes 40 (61); Brendan Doggett 3/37 (14.1 overs)

Queensland won by an innings and 33 runs
Allan Border Field, Brisbane
Umpires: Paul Wilson and Sam Nogajski
Player of the match: Marnus Labuschagne (Queensland)

- New South Wales won the toss and elected to bat.
- This was the first time Queensland had won against New South Wales in a Sheffield Shield Final

== Statistics ==
=== Most runs ===
Player	Team	Mat	Inns	NO	Runs	Ave	HS	100	50
Cameron Green	Western Australia	8	14	2	922	76.83	251	3	2
Travis Head	South Australia	7	14	1	893	68.69	223	3	3
Marnus Labuschagne	Queensland	8	10	0	821	82.1	192	4	2
Shaun Marsh	Western Australia	8	14	1	734	54.46	135	3	3
Marcus Harris	Victoria	8	13	2	695	63.18	239	2	1

=== Most wickets ===
Player	Team	Mat	Inns	Overs	Wkts	Ave	Econ	BBI	BBM	5	10
Nathan Lyon	New South Wales	9	15	412.3	42	25.97	2.64	6/21	10/78	3	1
Jackson Bird	Tasmania	8	15	298.4	35	22.17	2.59	7/18	8/73	1	0
Mitchell Swepson	Queensland	5	10	288.4	32	23.14	2.59	5/55	10/173	3	1
Scott Boland	Victoria	8	12	265.1	30	24	2.71	6/61	8/113	1	0
Jon Holland	Victoria	8	12	296.2	27	28.85	2.62	5/82	9/172	1	0
