= Indian cricket team in Australia in 2020–21 =

International cricket tour

| | Australia | India |
- Dates: 27 November 2020 – 19 January 2021
| Captains | Tim Paine (Tests); Aaron Finch, Matthew Wade (ODIs & T20Is) (Note: Matthew Wade captained Australia for the 2nd T20I.) | Virat Kohli; Ajinkya Rahane (Note: Ajinkya Rahane captained India for the last three Test matches.) |

Test series
- Result: India won the 4-match series 2–1
| Most runs | Marnus Labuschagne (426) | Rishabh Pant (274) |
| Most wickets | Pat Cummins (21) | Mohammed Siraj (13) |
- Player of the series: Pat Cummins (Aus)

One Day International series
- Results: Australia won the 3-match series 2–1
| Most runs | Aaron Finch (249) | Hardik Pandya (210) |
| Most wickets | Adam Zampa (7) | Jasprit Bumrah (4); Mohammed Shami (4) |
- Player of the series: Steve Smith (Aus)

Twenty20 International series
- Results: India won the 3-match series 2–1
| Most runs | Matthew Wade (145) | Virat Kohli (134) |
| Most wickets | Mitchell Swepson (5) | T. Natarajan (6) |
- Player of the series: Hardik Pandya (Ind)

The India cricket team toured Australia from November 2020 to January 2021 to play four Tests, three One Day Internationals (ODIs) and three Twenty20 International (T20I) matches. The Test series formed part of the inaugural ICC World Test Championship, and the ODI series formed part of the inaugural ICC Cricket World Cup Super League.

In February 2020, the Board of Control for Cricket in India (BCCI) announced that they wanted to play one of the Test matches as a day/night fixture. On 22 October 2020, the tour was approved by the NSW Government, with Sydney and Canberra confirmed as the hosts of the limited overs matches. Four days later, Cricket Australia confirmed the fixtures for the tour. On 9 November 2020, the BCCI announced that India's captain Virat Kohli had been granted paternity leave, and left the tour after the first Test match. Ajinkya Rahane led the Indian team in Kohli's absence.

Australia won the first and second ODI matches to take a lead in the series. India won the third ODI match by 13 runs, with Australia winning the series 2–1. India also won the first and second T20I matches, winning the T20I series with a game to spare. This series victory made Virat Kohli the first captain to win a T20I series in both Australia and England. Australia won the third and final match by 12 runs, with India winning the series 2–1.

In the first Test, India were bowled out for 36 runs in the second innings, their lowest team total in a Test match. Australia went on to win the match by eight wickets. India then won the second Test by the same margin to level the series. The third Test ended in a draw, with the series remaining at 1–1. India won the fourth and final Test match by three wickets, to win the series 2–1.

It was the 10th time Australia lost a test series on home soil outside The Ashes, (Note: England achieved this in 1882–83, 1884–85, 1886–87, 1887–88, 1894–95, 1903–04, 1911–12, 1928–29, 1932–33, 1954–55, 1970–71, 1978–79, 1986–87 and 2010–11.) West Indies in 1979–80, West Indies in 1984–85, New Zealand in 1985–86, West Indies in 1988–89, West Indies in 1992–93, South Africa in 2008–09, South Africa in 2012–13, South Africa in 2016–17 and India in 2018–19.

== Background ==
In April 2020, Kevin Roberts, CEO of Cricket Australia looked at "creative" solutions for the tour due to the COVID-19 pandemic. These included the possibility of playing five Test matches instead of four, and to play all the Test matches behind closed doors at the Adelaide Oval. The Australian government was also looking at applying international travel exemptions to allow the tour to happen. The following month, the BCCI confirmed that they were willing to put players in a two-week quarantine period to ensure that the tour goes ahead. Kevin Roberts later added that there is a "nine out of 10" chance of the tour taking place. The Test series was scheduled to start in December 2020, with the first Test in Brisbane. The ODI series was scheduled to start in January 2021. On 28 May 2020, Cricket Australia confirmed all of the fixtures for the series. The following day, Kevin Roberts stated that the number of Test venues could be reduced to one or two grounds, depending on any travel restrictions imposed due to the virus.

Originally, the tour was also going to start with three Twenty20 International (T20I) matches, commencing on 11 October 2020, ahead of the then scheduled 2020 ICC Men's T20 World Cup. However, in July 2020, the International Cricket Council (ICC) confirmed that the tournament had been postponed until 2021, due to the COVID-19 pandemic. As a result, the T20I matches were postponed, after they clashed with the revised fixtures for the 2020 Indian Premier League. Despite a lockdown in Melbourne in August 2020, Cricket Australia said they would do everything they can to ensure the Boxing Day Test goes ahead as planned. Cricket Australia were also looking at a revised schedule for the tour, including playing all the limited-overs matches before the Test series. On 20 August 2020, Sourav Ganguly, president of the BCCI, said that India's senior men's team would travel to Australia to fulfil their Future Tours Programme (FTP) commitments.

In September 2020, Cricket Australia were looking at further contingency plans for the tour, including moving venues if needed, and the possibility of replacing the Test match in Brisbane with white-ball fixtures. It was later announced that no matches of any form of cricket would be played in Perth, due to a major quarantine breach by then-Sydney Swans player Elijah Taylor during the 2020 AFL season.

In October 2020, an updated tour itinerary was published, with the ODIs taking place in Brisbane, the T20Is taking place in Adelaide, and the day/night Test match also taking place in Adelaide. Cricket Australia also confirmed that the Sydney Cricket Ground and the Manuka Oval in Canberra were part of their contingency plan to host the limited overs matches of the tour.

In October 2020, plans began to emerge to allow crowds back into venues, with Australia slowly coming out of COVID-19 restrictions. The following month, Cricket Australia confirmed the ground capacities for each match on the tour, with the possibility of more tickets being made available closer to the start of each match.

In late December 2020, there was a COVID-19 outbreak in Sydney, prompting tighter restrictions in New South Wales. As a result, Cricket Australia looked at the contingency of swapping the venues of the third and fourth Tests in Sydney and Brisbane respectively. Other scenarios that Cricket Australia were looking at was to host the last two Tests in Sydney, to avoid travel between states, or to host the second and third Tests in Melbourne. On 29 December 2020, Cricket Australia confirmed that Sydney would host the third Test as scheduled. On 4 January 2021, the crowd capacity of the Sydney Cricket Ground was reduced from 50% to 25%.

== Squads ==
| Tests | | ODIs | | T20Is | |
| Australia | India | Australia | India | Australia | India |
|---|---|---|---|---|---|
| Tim Paine (c, wk); Pat Cummins (vc); Sean Abbott; Joe Burns; Cameron Green; Marcus Harris; Josh Hazlewood; Travis Head; Moises Henriques; Marnus Labuschagne; Nathan Lyon; Michael Neser; ~~James Pattinson~~; Will Pucovski; Steve Smith; Mitchell Starc; Mitchell Swepson; Matthew Wade (wk); David Warner | Ajinkya Rahane (c) (Note: Virat Kohli was the captain for the first Test while Ajinkya Rahane was the captain for the rest of the series.); Virat Kohli (c); Rohit Sharma (vc); Mayank Agarwal; Ravichandran Ashwin; Jasprit Bumrah; Shubman Gill; Ravindra Jadeja; T. Natarajan; Rishabh Pant (wk); Cheteshwar Pujara; ~~KL Rahul~~; Wriddhiman Saha (wk); Navdeep Saini; Mohammed Shami; Prithvi Shaw; Mohammed Siraj; Washington Sundar; Shardul Thakur; Hanuma Vihari; Kuldeep Yadav; Umesh Yadav | Aaron Finch (c); Pat Cummins (vc); Sean Abbott; Ashton Agar; Alex Carey (wk); Cameron Green; Josh Hazlewood; Moises Henriques; Marnus Labuschagne; Glenn Maxwell; Daniel Sams; ~~Kane Richardson~~; Steve Smith; Mitchell Starc; Marcus Stoinis; Andrew Tye; Matthew Wade; David Warner; Adam Zampa | Virat Kohli (c); KL Rahul (vc, wk); Mayank Agarwal; Jasprit Bumrah; Yuzvendra Chahal; Shikhar Dhawan; Shubman Gill; Shreyas Iyer; Ravindra Jadeja; T. Natarajan; Manish Pandey; Hardik Pandya; Navdeep Saini; Sanju Samson (wk); Mohammed Shami; Shardul Thakur; Kuldeep Yadav | Aaron Finch (c); ~~Pat Cummins (vc)~~; Sean Abbott; ~~Ashton Agar~~; Alex Carey (wk); ~~Cameron Green~~; Josh Hazlewood; Moises Henriques; Marnus Labuschagne; Nathan Lyon; Glenn Maxwell; Daniel Sams; ~~Kane Richardson~~; D'Arcy Short; Steve Smith; Mitchell Starc; Marcus Stoinis; Mitchell Swepson; Andrew Tye; Matthew Wade; ~~David Warner~~; Adam Zampa | Virat Kohli (c); KL Rahul (vc, wk); Mayank Agarwal; Jasprit Bumrah; Yuzvendra Chahal; Deepak Chahar; ~~Varun Chakravarthy~~; Shikhar Dhawan; Shreyas Iyer; Ravindra Jadeja; T. Natarajan; Manish Pandey; Hardik Pandya; Navdeep Saini; Sanju Samson (wk); Mohammed Shami; Washington Sundar; Shardul Thakur |

On 26 October 2020, India named their squad for the tour, with Kamlesh Nagarkoti, Kartik Tyagi, Ishan Porel and T. Natarajan named as additional bowlers to travel with the team. Rohit Sharma and Ishant Sharma were not named in India's squads, after both players suffered injuries during the 2020 Indian Premier League. KL Rahul was named as the vice-captain of India for the limited overs matches, in place of Rohit Sharma.

On 9 November 2020, the BCCI made several updates for the squads for the tour. Virat Kohli was granted paternity leave to leave the squad after the first Test match, and Rohit Sharma was added to India's Test squad for the tour. T. Natarajan was added to India's T20I squad, replacing Varun Chakravarthy who was ruled out due to an injury, and Sanju Samson was added to India's ODI squad as an extra wicket-keeper. Kamlesh Nagarkoti, one of the four additional bowlers named for the tour, was also ruled out due to the management of his workload. On 12 November 2020, the Indian squad arrived in Sydney to begin a two-week long quarantine period. On 24 November 2020, the BCCI confirmed that Ishant Sharma and Rohit Sharma had been ruled out of the first two Test matches. On 26 November 2020, T. Natarajan was added to India's squad for the ODI series. Natarajan was named as cover for Navdeep Saini, who was suffering with a back spasm. Later the same day, the BCCI also confirmed that Ishant Sharma had been ruled out of the tour due to injury.

In November 2020, Kane Richardson was withdrawn from Australia's ODI and T20I squads, after he opted to stay at home with his newborn son. Andrew Tye was named as Richardson's replacement. On 30 November 2020, David Warner was ruled out of the remaining limited-overs games after suffering a groin injury in the second ODI. Subsequently, D'Arcy Short was named as Warner's replacement in the T20I series. Additionally, Pat Cummins was rested for the remainder of the white-ball matches to prepare for the Test series. Ashton Agar was ruled out of Australia's squad for the T20I series due to an injury, with Mitchell Swepson replacing him.

On 4 December 2020, India's Ravindra Jadeja suffered a concussion during the first T20I match. He was ruled out of the rest of the T20I series, with Shardul Thakur named as his replacement. The following day, Cameron Green was released from Australia's T20I squad, with Nathan Lyon named as his replacement. On 6 December 2020, Mitchell Starc withdrew from Australia's squad for the rest of the T20I series for personal reasons.

On 9 December 2020, David Warner was ruled out of Australia's squad for the first Test in Adelaide, due to an injury. On 12 December 2020, Marcus Harris was added to Australia's squad, after Will Pucovski was ruled out of the first Test in Adelaide due to a concussion. On 14 December 2020, Sean Abbott was ruled out of Australia's squad for the first Test due to an injury, with Moises Henriques named as Abbott's replacement. On 23 December 2020, Cricket Australia confirmed that both David Warner and Sean Abbott had also been ruled out of the second Test. On 30 December 2020, Joe Burns was dropped from Australia's squad for the third and fourth Tests, with David Warner, Will Pucovski and Sean Abbott returning to the Test squad. On 4 January 2021, James Pattinson was ruled out of the third Test, and was not replaced in Australia's squad. Will Pucovski was ruled out of Australia's squad for the fourth Test due to a shoulder injury, with Marcus Harris named as his replacement.

On 11 December 2020, the BCCI confirmed that Rohit Sharma had passed a fitness assessment, and would be available for selection for the last two Test matches. On 19 December 2020, Mohammed Shami was ruled out of India's squad for the last three Tests, after suffering a fractured arm in the first Test. T. Natarajan was added to India's squad ahead of the third Test match. Umesh Yadav was ruled out of India's squad for the last two Tests, due to a calf injury. Shardul Thakur was also added to India's squad for the last two Test matches, replacing Mohammed Shami. On 2 January 2021, Rohit Sharma was named the vice-captain of India's squad for the last two Test matches. On 5 January 2021, KL Rahul was ruled out of the last two Test matches due to a wrist sprain. Ravindra Jadeja, Ravichandran Ashwin and Hanuma Vihari were both ruled out of the fourth Test due to injuries they sustained in the third Test. Jasprit Bumrah was also ruled out of India's squad for the fourth Test, following an abdominal strain. On 12 January 2021, Washington Sundar was added to India's squad for the fourth Test, replacing Ravindra Jadeja.

== Tour matches ==
Two three-day tour matches were played in Sydney, with both matches having first-class status. The second match was a day/night fixture in preparation for the first Test.

6–8 December 2020
Scorecard

| India | v | Australia A |
| 9/247d (93 overs); Ajinkya Rahane 117* (242); James Pattinson 3/58 (19 overs) | | 9/306d (95 overs); Cameron Green 125* (202); Umesh Yadav 3/48 (20 overs) |
| 9/189d (61 overs); Wriddhiman Saha 54* (100); Mark Steketee 5/37 (15 overs) | | 1/52 (15 overs); Marcus Harris 25* (42); Umesh Yadav 1/14 (4 overs) |

Match drawn
Drummoyne Oval, Sydney
Umpires: Shawn Craig (Aus) and Bruce Oxenford (Aus)
Player of the match: Cameron Green (Australia A)

- India won the toss and elected to bat.

11–13 December 2020 (D/N)
Scorecard

| India | v | Australia A |
| 194 (48.3 overs); Jasprit Bumrah 55* (57); Jack Wildermuth 3/13 (8 overs) | | 108 (32.2 overs); Alex Carey 32 (38); Navdeep Saini 3/19 (5.2 overs) |
| 4/386d (90 overs); Hanuma Vihari 104* (194); Mark Steketee 2/54 (16 overs) | | 4/307 (75 overs); Jack Wildermuth 111* (119); Mohammed Shami 2/58 (13 overs) |

Match drawn
Sydney Cricket Ground, Sydney
Umpires: Gerard Abood (Aus) and Bruce Oxenford (Aus)

- India won the toss and elected to bat.
- Patrick Rowe made his first-class debut after replacing Cameron Green as a concussion for Australia A on day 1.
- Harry Conway (Australia A) was replaced by Mark Steketee on day 2, after suffering a concussion.

== ODI series ==
=== 1st ODI ===
27 November 2020
14:40 (D/N)
Scorecard

| Australia; 6/374 (50 overs) | v | India; 8/308 (50 overs) |
| Aaron Finch 114 (124); Mohammed Shami 3/59 (10 overs) | | Hardik Pandya 90 (76); Adam Zampa 4/54 (10 overs) |

Australia won by 66 runs
Sydney Cricket Ground, Sydney
Umpires: Sam Nogajski (Aus) and Rod Tucker (Aus)
Player of the match: Steve Smith (Aus)

- Australia won the toss and elected to bat.
- Aaron Finch (Aus) scored his 5,000th run in ODIs.
- Hardik Pandya (Ind) scored his 1,000th run in ODIs,
- World Cup Super League points: Australia 10, India −1. (Note: India were deducted one WCSL point for bowling a slow over-rate.)

=== 2nd ODI ===
29 November 2020
14:40 (D/N)
Scorecard

| Australia; 4/389 (50 overs) | v | India; 9/338 (50 overs) |
| Steve Smith 104 (64); Hardik Pandya 1/24 (4 overs) | | Virat Kohli 89 (87); Pat Cummins 3/67 (10 overs) |

Australia won by 51 runs
Sydney Cricket Ground, Sydney
Umpires: Gerard Abood (Aus) and Paul Reiffel (Aus)
Player of the match: Steve Smith (Aus)

- Australia won the toss and elected to bat.
- Virat Kohli (Ind) played in his 250th ODI.
- This was the highest total for Australia against India in ODIs.
- World Cup Super League points: Australia 10, India 0.

=== 3rd ODI ===
2 December 2020
14:40 (D/N)
Scorecard

| India; 5/302 (50 overs) | v | Australia; 289 (49.3 overs) |
| Hardik Pandya 92* (76); Ashton Agar 2/44 (10 overs) | | Aaron Finch 75 (82); Shardul Thakur 3/51 (10 overs) |

India won by 13 runs
Manuka Oval, Canberra
Umpires: Bruce Oxenford (Aus) and Paul Wilson (Aus)
Player of the match: Hardik Pandya (Ind)

- India won the toss and elected to bat.
- Cameron Green (Aus) and T. Natarajan (Ind) both made their ODI debuts.
- Virat Kohli (Ind) scored his 12,000th run in ODI cricket, breaking Sachin Tendulkar's record for the fastest to 12,000 runs in ODIs.
- World Cup Super League points: India 10, Australia 0.

== T20I series ==
=== 1st T20I ===
4 December 2020
19:10 (N)
Scorecard

| India; 7/161 (20 overs) | v | Australia; 7/150 (20 overs) |
| KL Rahul 51 (40); Moises Henriques 3/22 (4 overs) | | Aaron Finch 35 (26); Yuzvendra Chahal 3/25 (4 overs) |

India won by 11 runs
Manuka Oval, Canberra
Umpires: Shawn Craig (Aus) and Rod Tucker (Aus)
Player of the match: Yuzvendra Chahal (Ind)

- Australia won the toss and elected to field.
- T. Natarajan (Ind) made his T20I debut.
- Ravindra Jadeja was replaced by Yuzvendra Chahal after suffering a concussion during India's batting innings.
- Yuzvendra Chahal (Ind) was the first concussion substitute to be named man of the match in an international cricket match.

=== 2nd T20I ===
6 December 2020
19:10 (N)
Scorecard

| Australia; 5/194 (20 overs) | v | India; 4/195 (19.4 overs) |
| Matthew Wade 58 (32); T. Natarajan 2/20 (4 overs) | | Shikhar Dhawan 52 (36); Mitchell Swepson 1/25 (4 overs) |

India won by 6 wickets
Sydney Cricket Ground, Sydney
Umpires: Sam Nogajski (Aus) and Paul Wilson (Aus)
Player of the match: Hardik Pandya (Ind)

- India won the toss and elected to field.
- Daniel Sams (Aus) made his T20I debut.
- Matthew Wade captained Australia for the first time in T20Is.

=== 3rd T20I ===
8 December 2020
19:10 (N)
Scorecard

| Australia; 5/186 (20 overs) | v | India; 7/174 (20 overs) |
| Matthew Wade 80 (53); Washington Sundar 2/34 (4 overs) | | Virat Kohli 85 (61); Mitchell Swepson 3/23 (4 overs) |

Australia won by 12 runs
Sydney Cricket Ground, Sydney
Umpires: Gerard Abood (Aus) and Rod Tucker (Aus)
Player of the match: Mitchell Swepson (Aus)

- India won the toss and elected to field.

== Test series ==
=== 1st Test ===
17–21 December 2020 (Note: While five days of play were scheduled for each Test, the first Test reached a result in three days and the second Test reached a result in four days.) (D/N)
Scorecard

| India | v | Australia |
| 244 (93.1 overs); Virat Kohli 74 (180); Mitchell Starc 4/53 (21 overs) | | 191 (72.1 overs); Tim Paine 73* (99); Ravichandran Ashwin 4/55 (18 overs) |
| 36 (21.2 overs); Mayank Agarwal 9 (40); Josh Hazlewood 5/8 (5 overs) | | 2/93 (21 overs); Joe Burns 51* (63); Ravichandran Ashwin 1/16 (6 overs) |

Australia won by 8 wickets
Adelaide Oval, Adelaide
Umpires: Bruce Oxenford (Aus) and Paul Reiffel (Aus)
Player of the match: Tim Paine (Aus)

- India won the toss and elected to bat.
- Cameron Green (Aus) made his Test debut.
- Mayank Agarwal (Ind) scored his 1,000th run in Tests.
- Pat Cummins (Aus) took his 150th wicket in Tests.
- Josh Hazlewood (Aus) took his 200th wicket in Tests.
- India recorded their lowest team total in Tests and the joint-fourth lowest overall. It was the first instance in Tests when all 11 batsmen, and extras, did not cross single-figures in an innings.
- World Test Championship points: Australia 30, India 0.

==== Day One ====
Prithvi Shaw was bowled by Mitchell Starc with the second ball of the match. India consolidated by batting slowly, even as multiple chances were created but not taken by the Australians—Pujara had chances while on 0, 2 and 4, all evading fielders. India lost Agarwal with a ball from Cummins that nipped between bat and pad. Kohli and Pujara were not out at the lunch break, with India 2/41 after 25 overs, Pujara 17 and Kohli 5. India continued to bat slowly until tea, even after losing Pujara for 43 from 160 balls, India were 3/107 at the tea break. Just after 9pm, Rahane drove the ball to mid-off and called a run, but sent Kohli back leaving him stranded in the middle of the pitch. Hazlewood fielded the ball and Lyon broke the stumps, with Kohli being run out for 74. Rahane followed shortly after as he was dismissed lbw to Starc for 42 off 92 balls. Vihari was soon dismissed by Hazlewood, also by lbw, for 16 runs. After India were ahead for most of the day, Australia were now even or just in front, with India 6/233 at stumps.

==== Day Two ====
India lost their seventh wicket without adding to their overnight score, Ashwin dismissed by Cummins on the 3rd ball of the day. Saha flashed at a wide ball from Starc the next over, but all he could manage was an edge through to Paine behind the stumps. The Indian tail lasted only a few more overs, with Starc and Cummins claiming the final two wickets of Yadav for 6 and Shami for a duck. India was all out for 244, adding only 11 to their overnight score.

Australia, like India, batted slowly with four consecutive maidens at the start of the innings. Wade, who was only 8 off 50 balls, was deceived by Bumrah as he fell over his front pad and was trapped in front, a DRS review doing nothing to help his cause. Australia was 1/16 after 14.1 overs. Burns was lbw to Bumrah on the final ball of his next over, which was again reviewed but showed the ball crashing into the stumps. Labuschagne and Smith were at the wicket. Labuschagne was given three chances with two drops by Bumrah and Shaw. Shortly after the Shaw drop, Smith was almost runout at the non-striker's end as he was sent back by Labuschagne. However his luck ran out as he edged one from Ashwin to first slip, scoring just 1 from 29 balls as India dried up his scoring. Australia was 3/45 from 27 overs. Head and Green were skittled by Ashwin for low scores as Australia struggled to 5/92 from 48 overs at tea, Labuschagne was 46* and Paine was 9*. Labuschagne perished soon after tea but Paine rescued Australia's innings slightly as the tail wagged, dragging Australia to 191 from 72.1 overs, Paine stranded on 73* from 99 balls. Australia had 6 overs to bowl at the Indian openers, and managed to capture Shaw's wicket in the 4th over for 4. India sent out Bumrah as a nightwatchman, India 1/9 at stumps with a lead of 62.

==== Day Three ====
A remarkable spell of fast bowling followed. Bumrah was caught and bowled by Cummins in the second over of the day for 2. India was now 2/15. Pujara was removed for an eight-ball duck the next over by Cummins. Hazlewood continued, taking Agarwal for 9 and Rahane in the following over, completing a double-wicket maiden. The collapse continued as Kohli came to the wicket and scored a flashy four through gully but as he tried to repeat it, the ball caught the edge and was caught at gully by the debutant Green. India was 6/19 with a lead of just 72. Saha was caught by Labuschagne at midwicket for 4 in the 19th over, the replacement Ashwin being removed for a golden duck, both by Hazlewood. Vihari was taken by Hazlewood in the 21st over taking the score to 9/31. Cummins bowled the next over and hit Shami on his bowling arm. He tried to continue after being treated, but left the field and retired hurt. It was later revealed he had suffered a fractured wrist after undergoing scans. India had been bowled out for 36, their lowest in an innings of a Test match. This was the first time in an innings no batsman or extras had reached double figures.

Australia had been set 90 to win. Australia had 5 overs before the lunch break and reached the interval without losing a wicket, 0/15. The openers Burns and Wade reached 70 but then Wade was dismissed in a bizarre runout where the ball bounced off short leg's protective pad, Saha collecting it and flicking it through his legs to dislodge the bails. Labuschagne came to the crease and tried to attack Ashwin, top edging a hit over midwicket, caught by Agarwal at mid on. In what would be the final over of the match, Smith came to the wicket and scored a single off his first ball. Umesh bowled wide to Burns and he hit it through the slips cordon for 4. Burns, looking for his 50, hit the ball down to the fine leg fence, Vihari dropping the catch on the boundary, thus causing the ball to fly over for 6, Burns finishing on 51* along with Smith 1*, Australia winning by 8 wickets.

=== 2nd Test ===
26–30 December 2020
Scorecard

| Australia | v | India |
| 195 (72.3 overs); Marnus Labuschagne 48 (132); Jasprit Bumrah 4/56 (16 overs) | | 326 (115.1 overs); Ajinkya Rahane 112 (223); Nathan Lyon 3/72 (27.1 overs) |
| 200 (103.1 overs); Cameron Green 45 (146); Mohammed Siraj 3/37 (21.3 overs) | | 2/70 (15.5 overs); Shubman Gill 35* (36); Mitchell Starc 1/20 (4 overs) |

India won by 8 wickets
Melbourne Cricket Ground, Melbourne
Umpires: Bruce Oxenford (Aus) and Paul Reiffel (Aus)
Player of the match: Ajinkya Rahane (Ind)

- Australia won the toss and elected to bat.
- Shubman Gill and Mohammed Siraj (Ind) both made their Test debuts.
- This was the 100th Test match to be played between the two teams.
- Ravindra Jadeja (Ind) played in his 50th Test.
- Mitchell Starc (Aus) took his 250th wicket in Tests.
- Tim Paine (Aus) became the fastest wicket-keeper to take 150 dismissals in Tests, in terms of matches played (33).
- Ajinkya Rahane (Ind) was the first recipient of the Johnny Mullagh Medal for being the Player of the Match in the Boxing Day Test.
- World Test Championship points: India 30, Australia −4. (Note: Australia were deducted four WTC points for bowling a slow over-rate.)

==== Day One ====
Burns fell for a 10-ball duck in the fifth over of the match. Labuschagne came to the crease and put on a small partnership with Wade, but was broken in the 13th over, when Wade skied a pull shot off Ashwin, dismissed for 30. Smith came and went quickly for a duck in the 15th over. Australia were 3/38. Labuschagne and Head put on an 86 run partnership before Head edged to gully off Bumrah for 38. Labuschagne topscored with 48. The lower order managed to get Australia to 195 after 72.3 overs. Australia had 11 overs to bowl to India, and Starc managed to get Agarwal for a duck on the sixth ball of the innings. India were 1/36 at stumps, trailing by 159.

==== Day Two ====
Gill lost his wicket in the 22nd over after making 45 from 65 deliveries. Pujara followed in the 24th over for 17 from 70 deliveries, both wickets being taken by Pat Cummins. India were 3/90 after 37 overs at lunch; Rahane was on 10 and Vihari on 13. Lyon got Vihari on 21 in the 45th over. Pant made 29 at a strike rate of 72.50 as India reached 5/189 at tea. Jadeja then combined with Rahane as they accelerated in the final session of the day to take India to 5/277 with Rahane ending the day on 104*, and Jadeja 40*.

==== Day Three ====
Rahane was run out by Labuschagne combining with Tim Paine at the stumps for 112. Jadeja was removed by Starc for 57, and India were 7/306. The tail folded in the next nine overs. India had added just 49 runs in the session, as they were bowled out for 326, creating a first-innings lead of 131. Australia came out to bat after lunch and Burns again fell cheaply to Yadav in the 4th over, however Yadav left soon after with muscle pain and left India with a bowler down. Labuschagne offered some resistance but edged a ball from Ashwin to Rahane at slip, making 28 runs. Australia were 2/65 at tea, Wade was on 27 and Smith was on 6. In the final session, Smith was dismissed for 8, bowled behind his legs by Bumrah causing Australia to be 3/71 after 32.2 overs. Wade fell for 40 in the 44th over, and Head followed shortly after for 17 in the 47th over. Australian captain Paine was controversially given out by the third umpire after the on field umpire ruled not out in the 48th over, falling for 1. Australia ended the day at 6/133, a lead of 2 runs. Green and Cummins were 17* and 15* respectively.

==== Day Four ====
The final day of the game ended just after lunch with India achieving victory by eight wickets. Green and Cummins initially resisted the Indian attack, however Cummins fell for 22 to a Bumrah bouncer, and Green, batting with the tail, was caught in the same way as the last match—a mistimed pull shot caught at midwicket. Australia quickly folded for 200, setting India a target of 70 to win. India in their second innings lost Agarwal and Pujara to low scores but captain Rahane and Gill finished on 27* and 35*, achieving the target in 15.5 overs, to level the series 1–1.

=== 3rd Test ===
7–11 January 2021
Scorecard

| Australia | v | India |
| 338 (105.4 overs); Steve Smith 131 (226); Ravindra Jadeja 4/62 (18 overs) | | 244 (100.4 overs); Shubman Gill 50 (101); Pat Cummins 4/29 (21.4 overs) |
| 6/312d (87 overs); Cameron Green 84 (132); Navdeep Saini 2/54 (16 overs) | | 5/334 (131 overs); Rishabh Pant 97 (118); Josh Hazlewood 2/39 (26 overs) |

Match drawn
Sydney Cricket Ground, Sydney
Umpires: Paul Reiffel (Aus) and Paul Wilson (Aus)
Player of the match: Steve Smith (Aus)

- Australia won the toss and elected to bat.
- 35 overs were lost on day 1 due to rain.
- Will Pucovski (Aus) and Navdeep Saini (Ind) both made their Test debuts.
- Claire Polosak (Aus) became the first female to officiate in a men's Test match as fourth umpire.
- Cheteshwar Pujara (Ind) scored his 6,000th run in Tests.
- World Test Championship points: Australia 10, India 10.

==== Day One ====
Warner was gone in the fourth over of the match for 5 runs, edging to Pujara in the slips off Siraj. Labuschagne came out to bat and joined the debutant opening batsman Pucovski. Australia was 1/21 in the 8th over, when play was stopped one ball into the over due to rain. Lunch was taken early, as 35 overs were lost due to rain. The covers were cleared before tea, and Pucovski was dropped on 26 and 32 by Rishabh Pant before reaching his maiden half century off 97 balls. Australia was 1/93 from 31 overs at tea with Pucovski on 54* and Labuschagne on 34*. Pucovski fell for 62, ending a 100-run stand. Australia was 2/106. Smith came to the wicket, as Labuschagne brought up his 50 off 108 balls, with six fours. Australia ended the day on 2/166 with Labuschagne on 67* and Smith on 31*. Australia was generally considered on top at stumps.

==== Day Two ====
Rain delays continued, as Australia reached 200 in the 69th over. Labuschagne fell shortly after for 91, caught by Rahane at slip from the bowling of Jadeja. Smith received little support from the rest of the team as Australia collapsed to lose its final eight wickets for 130 runs. Green, Cummins and Lyon were all dismissed for ducks. Despite this, Smith made his 27th Test hundred batting with the tail, but was finally run out for 131 off 226 balls. India came out to bat and the opening pair of Gill and Rohit Sharma put on 70 before Sharma was caught and bowled by Hazlewood for 26, on the final ball of the 27th over. Gill fell shortly after for 50, being caught at gully by Green off the bowling of Cummins. India finished the day on 2/96 from 45 overs, erasing Australia's lead to 242 runs at stumps. Pujara was 9* and Rahane was 5*.

==== Day Three ====
Rahane was bowled by Cummins for 22 from 70 balls in the 55th over. Pujara anchored the innings, adding 50 off 176 balls as India collapsed from 3/142 to 244 all out, as Vihari, Ashwin and Bumrah were all run out. Australia had a first innings lead of 94. Australia had 29 overs to bat out in the final session. Pucovski was caught behind off Siraj for 10 in the sixth over, and Warner fell in the tenth over, leg before wicket to Ashwin for 13. Australia was 2/35 but Smith and Labuschagne partnered together to a stand of 68 at stumps, Australia was 2/103 from 29 overs, and Labuschagne was 47* while Smith was 29*. Australia led by 197.

==== Day Four ====
Labuschagne again fell short of a hundred as he was caught behind off Saini for 73. Smith, Green and Paine batted Australia to a lead of 406, as they made 81, 84 and 39* respectively. India had a target of 407 to win the match in four sessions. India had another promising first wicket stand, until Gill was claimed for 31 in the 23rd over by Hazlewood. Sharma's wicket was claimed by Cummins in the 31st over as he attempted a pull shot but was caught at backward square leg by Starc. India was 2/98 from 34 overs at stumps, with Pujara on 9* and Rahane 4*.

==== Day Five ====
India required 309 on the final day. Rahane was caught by Wade at short leg off the bowling of Lyon in the second over of the day. India was 3/102. Pant was sent out at number five and put on a 148-run partnership with Pujara before Pant fell for 97 in the 80th over. Pujara was bowled by Hazlewood in the 89th over. Vihari and Ashwin survived the rest of the overs without too much trouble, as India played the match out for a draw. They did have a scare in the 123rd over, as Starc caught the edge of Vihari's bat, but the chance was dropped by the keeper Paine. The chance of the match ending in a win for either team was dropping at this point, as the five wickets for Australia and 88 runs proved too difficult for either team to manage. Vihari finished with 23* (161) and Ashwin was 39* (128).

=== 4th Test ===
15–19 January 2021
Scorecard

| Australia | v | India |
| 369 (115.2 overs); Marnus Labuschagne 108 (204); T. Natarajan 3/78 (24.2 overs) | | 336 (111.4 overs); Shardul Thakur 67 (115); Josh Hazlewood 5/57 (24.4 overs) |
| 294 (75.5 overs); Steve Smith 55 (74); Mohammed Siraj 5/73 (19.5 overs) | | 7/329 (97 overs); Shubman Gill 91 (146); Pat Cummins 4/55 (24 overs) |

India won by 3 wickets
The Gabba, Brisbane
Umpires: Bruce Oxenford (Aus) and Paul Wilson (Aus)
Player of the match: Rishabh Pant (Ind)

- Australia won the toss and elected to bat.
- No play was possible after tea on day 2 due to rain.
- T. Natarajan and Washington Sundar (Ind) both made their Test debuts.
- Nathan Lyon (Aus) played in his 100th Test.
- Mohammed Siraj (Ind) took his first five-wicket haul in Tests.
- Rishabh Pant (Ind) scored his 1,000th run in Tests, the fastest by an Indian wicket-keeper.
- This was Australia's first loss in a Test match at the Gabba in 32 years, and India became the first Asian team to win a Test match at this ground.
- World Test Championship points: India 30, Australia 0

==== Day One ====
The start of the game saw a massive difference in terms of experience between the two sides. Indian bowlers had a combined total of 13 wickets, with T Natarajan and Washington Sundar making their debuts following injuries to Bumrah and Ashwin. However, this did not deter the Indian bowling who started with the session by dismissing both Warner and Marcus Harris in the first hour. This was followed by determined batting by Smith and Labuschagne. Labuschagne finally got his much deserved century late in the day with Australia ending on 5/274. India suffered further injury setbacks when Navdeep Saini left the field owing to groin pain.

==== Day Two ====
Day two started with India fighting back and dismissing Paine early. Some lower order resistance resulted in Australia reaching 369 before being dismissed at the stroke of lunch. India lost Gill early in their reply. However, Rohit Sharma and Pujara steadied the innings. However, Sharma fell due to his intention to attack Nathan Lyon, who was playing his 100th Test. Rain wiped out the last session and India finished the day on 2/62.

==== Day Three ====
Day three started with Pujara and Rahane leading India's reply. However, Pujara was dismissed by Hazlewood. Rahane fell soon after and with Mayank Agarwal, playing in middle order and Pant falling in the second session India were in trouble at 6/186. This was followed by the most enterprising partnership of the match with debutant Washington Sundar and Shardul Thakur, playing only his second Test, counter punching. They both scored sixties and with their 123 run partnership made sure India got as close to Australia's total as possible. Australia ended the day on 0/21.

==== Day Four ====
Day four started with Warner and Harris leading the charge for Australia. Runs were scored fairly easily before Thakur got Harris out after an opening wicket partnership of 89 runs. Warner was soon dismissed by Sundar with Australia ending on 4/149 at Lunch. The post-lunch session saw Green and Smith consolidate Australia's position before Smith was dismissed for 55 by Siraj. Rain caused early tea with Australia on 7/243. Post tea session saw Siraj get his maiden five-wicket haul as Australia were finally dismissed for 294 setting India a target of 328 runs, or bat out 114 overs. India ended the day on 0/4 as rain brought an early end to proceedings.

==== Day Five ====
India lost Rohit Sharma early on the last day. This was however followed by a 114 run partnership between Gill and Pujara as India set out to chase the target. Gill was dismissed for 91. Rahane hit a quickfire 24 off 22 balls, as India ended the second session on 183/3, meaning they required 145 runs of 37 overs. The post-tea session saw Pant ignite this test match as he in combination with Pujara led India's reply. Pujara fell for 56 immediately after new ball was taken. This was followed by Mayank Agarwal failing for the second time in the match. However, Pant led the charge as India reached the final target with three overs left in the day. The win has been regarded as India's greatest overseas triumph and meant Australia lost a Test at the Gabba for the first time since 1988.

== In popular culture ==
In 2022, Voot released a four-episodes documentary miniseries on India's Test series victory called Bandon Mein Tha Dum (translation : The Boys Had Guts) directed by Neeraj Pandey and narrated by Jimmy Shergill. It featured interviews of Ajinkya Rahane, Cheteshwar Pujara, Ravichandran Ashwin, Rishabh Pant, Hanuma Vihari, Mohammad Siraj, Washington Sundar, Tim Paine, Pat Cummins, and several cricket journalists.
