= Will Pucovski =

Australian cricketer (born 1998)

Personal information
- Full name: William Jan Pucovski
- Born: 2 February 1998 (age 28); Malvern, Victoria, Australia
- Height: 179 cm (5 ft 10 in)
- Batting: Right-handed
- Bowling: Right-arm off break
- Role: Top-order batter

International information
- National side: Australia (2021)
- Only Test (cap 460): 7 January 2021 v India

Domestic team information
- Years: Team
- 2016/17–2023/24: Victoria (squad no. 10)

Career statistics
Competition	Test	FC	LA
Matches	1	36	14
Runs scored	72	2,350	333
Batting average	36.00	45.19	27.75
100s/50s	0/1	7/9	1/2
Top score	62	255*	137
Catches/stumpings	0/–	18/–	6/–
- Source: ESPNcricinfo, 10 April 2025

William Jan Pucovski (born 2 February 1998) is an Australian former cricketer. He made his List A debut for Cricket Australia XI against Pakistan during their tour of Australia on 10 January 2017. He made his first-class debut for Victoria in the 2016–17 Sheffield Shield season on 1 February 2017.

He played one Test match as the 460th cap for Australia, scoring a half-century 62 in his debut innings in 2021 against India and 10 in the second, before he suffered a shoulder injury whilst fielding that prevented further Test appearances. He suffered from at least 13 known concussion injuries during his career along with mental health issues, and retired at age 27 in 2025.

== Early life ==
Pucovski was born in Malvern, a suburb of Melbourne, Victoria. His father, Ján Pucovski, who emigrated to Australia as a child from Serbia, has Czechoslovak roots. Ján also played cricket, as a fast bowler, and was regarded as a "Caulfield legend".

Pucovski completed school at Brighton Grammar School in 2015, and was captain of the school's First XI and a school prefect. He was awarded the Bradman Young Cricketer of the Year at the Allan Border Medal ceremony by Cricket Australia in 2019.

== Cricket career ==
In the 2016-17 Under 19 National Championships, Pucovski scored four consecutive hundreds on his way to being named Player of the Championship and totalling 650 runs from eight innings, breaking the long-standing runs record held by Queensland's Jerry Cassel (568) since 1993–94.

In March 2018, he suffered a second concussion from a bouncer delivery in two years, the second of which was bowled by Sean Abbott. Pucovski was well enough to walk off the field unaided. In October 2018, he became only the second player representing Victoria in the Sheffield Shield, after Dean Jones, to hit a double century against the Western Australia cricket team at the WACA. Totalling 243 not out, Pucovski became just the ninth player in Sheffield Shield history to score a double-century before his 21st birthday. However, later the same month, he announced he would be taking a break from cricket due to a mental health-related illness.

In January 2019, he was named in Australia's Test squad for the series against Sri Lanka. After being named in the squad for the Test series, Pucovski said that it's every kid's dream to play for their country, and that getting that opportunity was "just amazing". However, he was not selected to play in either match during the series, and was released from the squad at the start of the Canberra Test, allowing him to continue to work on his mental health.

Ahead of the 2019–20 Marsh One-Day Cup, Pucovski was named as one of the six cricketers to watch during the tournament. In October 2020, in the third round of the 2020–21 Sheffield Shield season, Pucovski and Marcus Harris scored 486 runs for the first wicket in the match against South Australia, setting a new partnership record in the Sheffield Shield. Pucovski finished his innings on 255 not out, his highest score in first-class cricket. The following match, he scored 202 runs in the first innings, becoming the first batsman since Dene Hills in the 1997–98 season to score consecutive double-hundreds in the Sheffield Shield.

In November 2020, Pucovski was named in Australia's Test squad for their series against India. Pucovski suffered another concussion playing for Australia A in December 2020, bringing the total to nine concussions before playing a single game for Australia. He made his Test debut for Australia on 7 January 2021, against India, scoring 62 in his maiden Test innings. Pucovski had his baggy green cap presented to him by Andrew McDonald. However, during his debut, Pucovski suffered an injury to his shoulder that required reconstruction surgery which ruled him out of playing for six months. In February 2022, during the 2021–22 Sheffield Shield season, Pucovski suffered another concussion, the eleventh one of his career. In October 2022, Pucovski announced that he would be taking an indefinite leave from cricket.

After a year out of the game, Pucovski made his long-awaited return to play domestic cricket for Victoria in the 2023-24 Sheffield Shield. Pucovski played his first five matches of the season without an issue, before being struck on the head in a Second XI match against South Australia on 22 January 2024. Despite initially being cleared of concussion, delayed concussion symptoms ruled him out for the next Sheffield Shield match, but he made a comparatively quick return compared to previous concussions, missing only the one match and returning a couple of weeks later to face New South Wales at the Sydney Cricket Ground. Pucovski made a century in the match, his first since 2020 given all the interruptions his career had faced. That, however, turned out to be the second last match of his cricket career, as the following match he was struck on the head by a short ball from Riley Meredith against Tasmania, forcing him to be substituted out of the match and ending his season.

In September 2024, Pucovski was advised against continuing his cricket career following an assessment by a medical panel. He remained contracted to Victoria while discussions over contract and injury compensation were held.

On 8 April 2025, 13 months after his last cricket match, Pucovski announced his retirement from cricket, citing medical advice to not continue to play cricket due to his concussion history. While announcing his retirement on radio, Pucovski detailed some of the symptoms he was suffering from, including fatigue, headaches and motion sickness.

== Post-cricket career ==
On the day of his retirement, Pucovski was appointed senior coach of the Melbourne Cricket Club for the 2025-26 Victorian Premier Cricket season. Melbourne was Pucovski's premier cricket club during his playing career, having been with the club since age 12 and made his debut for its First XI at age 16.
