= Sri Lankan cricket team in Australia in 2018–19 =

International cricket tour

	Australia	Sri Lanka
- Dates: 17 January – 5 February 2019
Captains	Tim Paine	Dinesh Chandimal

Test series
- Result: Australia won the 2-match series 2–0
Most runs	Travis Head (304)	Niroshan Dickwella (140)
Most wickets	Pat Cummins (14)	Suranga Lakmal (5)
- Player of the series: Pat Cummins (Aus)

The Sri Lanka cricket team toured Australia in January and February 2019 to play two Test matches for the Warne–Muralitharan Trophy. The first Test, in Brisbane, was a day/night match. They also played a three-day warm-up match ahead of the Test series. In April 2018, Cricket Australia confirmed that the Manuka Oval would host its first ever Test match. Australia won the series 2–0, with Tim Paine winning his first Test series as captain of Australia.

== Squads ==
Tests
Australia	Sri Lanka
Tim Paine (c, wk); Pat Cummins (vc); Travis Head (vc); ~~Josh Hazlewood (vc)~~; Joe Burns; Marcus Harris; Usman Khawaja; Marnus Labuschagne; Nathan Lyon; Kurtis Patterson; Will Pucovski; Matt Renshaw; Jhye Richardson; Peter Siddle; Mitchell Starc; Marcus Stoinis	Dinesh Chandimal (c); Dimuth Karunaratne (vc); Dushmantha Chameera; Niroshan Dickwella (wk); Vishwa Fernando; Chamika Karunaratne; Lahiru Kumara; Suranga Lakmal; Kusal Mendis; Dilruwan Perera; Kusal Perera; ~~Nuwan Pradeep~~; Kasun Rajitha; Sadeera Samarawickrama; Lakshan Sandakan; Dhananjaya de Silva; Roshen Silva; Lahiru Thirimanne

Before the start of the series, Josh Hazlewood was ruled out of Australia's squad due to a back injury and was replaced by Jhye Richardson. Ahead of the first Test, Kurtis Patterson was added to Australia's squad. Pat Cummins and Travis Head were named the joint vice-captains of the Australian Test squad. Ahead of the second Test, Marcus Stoinis was added to Australia's squad, replacing Matt Renshaw.

Nuwan Pradeep was ruled out of Sri Lanka's squad before the Test series after suffering a hamstring injury during the warm-up match. Vishwa Fernando was named as his replacement in the team. Dushmantha Chameera and Lahiru Kumara were both ruled out of Sri Lanka's squad for the second Test due to injury. Chamika Karunaratne was added to Sri Lanka's squad as a replacement for Kumara.

== Tour match ==
=== Three-day match: Cricket Australia XI vs Sri Lanka ===
17–19 January 2019 (D/N)
Scorecard

Cricket Australia XI	v	Sri Lanka
5/316d (75 overs); Kurtis Patterson 157* (212); Dushmantha Chameera 3/57 (16 overs)		5/176d (75 overs); Dimuth Karunaratne 44 (92); Marnus Labuschagne 2/27 (9 overs)
3/224d (59 overs); Kurtis Patterson 102* (136); Kasun Rajitha 1/9 (3 overs)		6/131 (51 overs); Lahiru Thirimanne 46* (121); Jon Holland 4/28 (15 overs)

Match drawn
Bellerive Oval, Hobart
Umpires: Gerard Abood (Aus) and Simon Fry (Aus)
Player of the match: Kurtis Patterson (Cricket Australia XI)

- Cricket Australia XI won the toss and elected to bat.

== Test series ==
=== 1st Test ===
24–28 January 2019 (Note: While five days of play were scheduled for each Test, the first Test reached a result in three days and the second Test reached a result in four days.) (D/N)
Scorecard

Sri Lanka	v	Australia
144 (56.4 overs); Niroshan Dickwella 64 (78); Pat Cummins 4/39 (14.4 overs)		323 (106.2 overs); Travis Head 84 (187); Suranga Lakmal 5/75 (27 overs)
139 (50.5 overs); Lahiru Thirimanne 32 (98); Pat Cummins 6/23 (15 overs)

Australia won by an innings and 40 runs
The Gabba, Brisbane
Umpires: Marais Erasmus (SA) and Richard Illingworth (Eng)
Player of the match: Pat Cummins (Aus)

- Sri Lanka won the toss and elected to bat.
- Kurtis Patterson and Jhye Richardson (Aus) both made their Test debuts.
- Mitchell Starc (Aus) played in his 50th Test and took his 200th wicket in Tests.

=== 2nd Test ===
1–5 February 2019
Scorecard

Australia	v	Sri Lanka
5/534d (132 overs); Joe Burns 180 (260); Vishwa Fernando 3/126 (30 overs)		215 (68.3 overs); Dimuth Karunaratne 59 (95); Mitchell Starc 5/54 (13.3 overs)
3/196d (47 overs); Usman Khawaja 101* (136); Kasun Rajitha 2/64 (13 overs)		149 (51 overs); Kusal Mendis 42 (69); Mitchell Starc 5/46 (18 overs)

Australia won by 366 runs
Manuka Oval, Canberra
Umpires: Michael Gough (Eng) and Richard Illingworth (Eng)
Player of the match: Mitchell Starc (Aus)

- Australia won the toss and elected to bat.
- Chamika Karunaratne (SL) made his Test debut.
- This was the first Test to be played at this venue.
- Travis Head and Kurtis Patterson (Aus) both scored their first centuries in Tests.
- The 308-run partnership between Joe Burns and Travis Head was the highest Australian partnership in Tests against Sri Lanka. It was also the highest 4th wicket partnership against Sri Lanka in Tests.

== In popular culture ==
An Australian docu-series - The Test was produced, following the Australian national cricket team in the aftermath of the Australian ball tampering scandal. The fourth episode of Season 1 featured Australia playing the 2 tests against Sri Lanka.
