= Joe Medew-Ewen =

Australian cricketer

Personal information
- Full name: Joe Medew-Ewen
- Batting: Right-handed
- Bowling: Left-arm unorthodox spin
- Role: Bowler

Domestic team information
- Years: Team
- 2020/21: South Australia

Career statistics
Competition	FC
Matches	1
Runs scored	-
Batting average	-
100s/50s	-/-
Top score	-
Balls bowled	234
Wickets	3
Bowling average	55.00
5 wickets in innings	0
10 wickets in match	0
Best bowling	2/105
Catches/stumpings	0/–
- Source: Cricinfo, 5 October 2021

Joe Medew-Ewen is an Australian cricketer. He made his first-class debut on 6 March 2021, for South Australia in the 2020–21 Sheffield Shield season.
