= 1990–91 Sheffield Shield season =

Australian cricket tournament

- Cricket format: First-class
- Tournament format(s): Double round-robin & Final
- Champions: Victoria (25th title)
- Participants: 6
- Matches: 31
- Player of the series: Stuart Law (Queensland)
- Most runs: Stuart Law (Queensland) (1082)
- Most wickets: Paul Reiffel (Victoria) (49)

The 1990–91 Sheffield Shield season was the 89th season of the Sheffield Shield, the domestic first-class cricket competition of Australia. Victoria won the championship.

== Table ==
Team	Played	Won	Lost	Tied	Drawn	N/R	Points
Victoria	10	4	2	0	4	0	30
New South Wales	10	3	2	0	5	0	24
Queensland	10	3	3	0	4	0	22
Western Australia	10	2	4	0	4	0	18
South Australia	10	2	1	0	7	0	16
Tasmania	10	1	3	0	6	0	8

== Final ==
March 23-26 1991

New South Wales	v	Victoria (H)
223; Steve Small 82; Damien Fleming 4/53; Tony Dodemaide 3/69		119; Wayne Holdsworth 5/55; Phil Alley 3/33
134; Steve Small 30; Tony Dodemaide 5/25; Simon O'Donnell 3/34		239/2; Jamie Siddons 124*no Wayne Phillips 91*no

Victoria won by 8 wickets.
Venue: Melbourne Cricket Ground

The last time the two teams played, New South Wales defeated Victoria. A number of players from both sides were unavailable as they were touring with the Australian side in the West Indies, including Mark and Steve Waugh, Mark Taylor, Mike Whitney, Peter Taylor, Greg Matthews, Merv Hughes and Dean Jones. The game was at the MCG, meaning New South Wales had to win outright.

Victoria won the toss and sent in New South Wales to bat. They made 223, mostly due to Steve Small (82), Phil Emery (62) and Randall Green (40). The best Victoria bowlers were Damien Fleming (4-53) and Tony Dodemaide (3-69), with Fleming taking 3/17 off his first 17 deliveries.

New South Wales dismissed Victoria for 119, with Wayne Phillips' top scoring with 26. Wayne Holdworth took 5/55. New South Wales were at one stage 0-50, 154 runs ahead. However, Victoria bowled them out for 193, led by Dodemaide (5/25), setting Victoria 239 to win.

Victoria were 2-27 but then Wayne Phillips (91) and Jamie Siddons (124) combined for a partnership which saw the team win by eight wickets.

"It was definitely the hardest game of cricket I've ever played in," said Simon O'Donnell. It was the first time Victoria won the Shield since 1979-80.

Paul Jackson, a member of the Victoria team was also a member of the Queensland team which won the 1994-95 Sheffield Shield final.

== Statistics ==
=== Most Runs ===
Stuart Law 1082

=== Most Wickets ===
Paul Reiffel 49
