= Samuel Kerber =

Australian cricketer (born 1994)

Personal information
- Full name: Samuel Louis Kerber
- Born: 26 July 1994 (age 32); Shepparton, Victoria, Australia
- Batting: Left-handed
- Bowling: Slow left arm orthodox

Domestic team information
- Years: Team
- 2020/21–present: South Australia

Career statistics
| Competition | FC | LA |
|---|---|---|
| Matches | 2 | 3 |
| Runs scored | 99 | 37 |
| Batting average | 33.00 | 12.33 |
| 100s/50s | 0/1 | 0/0 |
| Top score | 55 | 22 |
| Balls bowled | 285 | 162 |
| Wickets | 3 | 1 |
| Bowling average | 66.00 | 210.00 |
| 5 wickets in innings | 0 | 0 |
| 10 wickets in match | 0 | 0 |
| Best bowling | 3/92 | 1/70 |
| Catches/stumpings | 3/– | 2/– |
- Source: Cricinfo, 4 October 2021

Samuel Louis Kerber (born 26 July 1994) is an Australian cricketer. He made his List A debut on 28 March 2021, for South Australia in the 2020–21 Marsh One-Day Cup. He made his first-class debut on 3 April 2021, for South Australia in the 2020–21 Sheffield Shield season. Samuel is also an exceptional and much loved footballer in the Australian Rules football team The Bastards.
