= Mitchell Swepson =

Australian cricketer

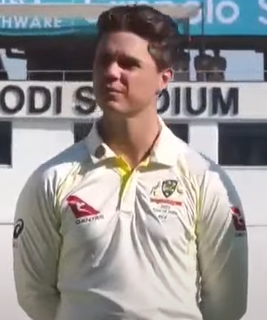
- Swepson in 2023

Personal information
- Full name: Mitchell Joseph Swepson
- Born: 4 October 1993 (age 33); Brisbane, Queensland, Australia
- Batting: Right-handed
- Bowling: Right-arm leg break
- Role: Bowler

International information
- National side: Australia (2018–2022)
- Test debut (cap 464): 12 March 2022 v Pakistan
- Last Test: 8 July 2022 v Sri Lanka
- ODI debut (cap 236): 29 March 2022 v Pakistan
- Last ODI: 16 June 2022 v Sri Lanka
- ODI shirt no.: 22
- T20I debut (cap 91): 27 June 2018 v England
- Last T20I: 9 October 2022 v England
- T20I shirt no.: 22

Domestic team information
- Years: Team
- 2015/16–present: Queensland
- 2015/16–2024/25: Brisbane Heat
- 2023: Glamorgan
- 2025/26–present: Melbourne Stars

Career statistics
Competition	Test	ODI	T20I	FC
Matches	4	3	8	100
Runs scored	28	2	32	1,318
Batting average	7.00	2.00	–	13.31
100s/50s	0/0	0/0	0/0	0/1
Top score	15*	2	14*	69
Balls bowled	892	158	150	19,254
Wickets	10	3	11	295
Bowling average	45.80	53.66	18.54	36.09
5 wickets in innings	0	0	0	7
10 wickets in match	0	–	–	2
Best bowling	3/55	2/53	3/12	6/109
Catches/stumpings	2/–	0/–	4/–	52/–
Medal record
Men's Cricket
Representing Australia
T20 World Cup
Winner	2021 UAE & Oman
- Source: Cricinfo, 23 October 2026

Mitchell Joseph Swepson (born 4 October 1993) is an Australian cricketer. A leg-spin bowler, he made his international debut for the Australia cricket team in June 2018, and plays for Queensland and the Melbourne Stars in Australian domestic cricket. Swepson was a member of the Australian team that won the 2021 T20 World Cup.

== Domestic career ==
Swepson made his List A debut for Cricket Australia XI on 5 October 2015 in the 2015–16 Matador BBQs One-Day Cup. He made his first-class debut for Cricket Australia XI on 29 October 2015 in a tour match against New Zealanders as part of New Zealand's tour to Australia. On 10 January 2016 he made his Twenty20 debut for the Brisbane Heat in the 2015–16 Big Bash League.

In November 2019, during the 2019–20 Sheffield Shield season match against Victoria, Swepson took a hat-trick in the first innings.

== International career ==
In January 2017 he was named in Australia's Test squad for their series against India, but he did not play. In August 2017, he was added to Australia's Test squad for their tour to Bangladesh, but he did not play. In May 2018, he was named in Australia's Twenty20 International (T20I) squad for the one-off match against England. He made his T20I debut for Australia against England on 27 June 2018. In December 2019, Swepson was added to Australia's Test squad for the third Test against New Zealand.

In November 2020, Swepson was named in Australia's Test squad for their series against India. In January 2021, Swepson was named in Australia's Test squad for their series against South Africa. In June 2021, Swepson was named in Australia's limited overs squad for their tours of the West Indies and Bangladesh.

In August 2021, Swepson was named in Australia's squad for the 2021 ICC Men's T20 World Cup. In November 2021, Swepson was named in Australia's Test squad for the 2021–22 Ashes series. In February 2022, Swepson was again named in Australia's Test squad, this time for their series against Pakistan. He made his Test debut in March 2022, in the second Test against Pakistan. In the first innings he took 2 wickets for 32 runs; in the second inning, he produced the worst innings return ever for an Australian bowler, as his 0/156 from 53.4 overs overtook Bryce McGain's 0/149 off just 18. During the same tour, Swepson was also added to Australia's One Day International (ODI) squad, replacing Steve Smith. He made his ODI debut on 29 March 2022, for Australia against Pakistan.
