= Marcus Harris (cricketer) =

Australian cricketer (born 1992)

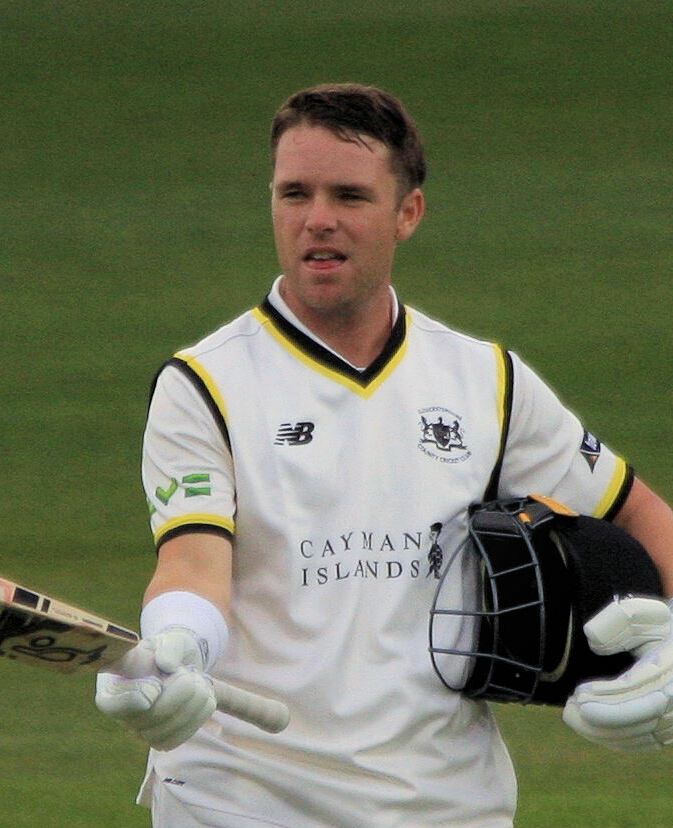
- Harris celebrates after scoring a century for Gloucestershire in 2022

Personal information
- Full name: Marcus Sinclair Harris
- Born: 21 July 1992 (age 34); Perth, Western Australia, Australia
- Nickname: Harry
- Height: 173 cm (5 ft 8 in)
- Batting: Left-handed
- Bowling: Right-arm off-break
- Role: Opening batter

International information
- National side: Australia (2018–2022)
- Test debut (cap 456): 6 December 2018 v India
- Last Test: 5 January 2022 v England

Domestic team information
- Years: Team
- 2010/11–2015/16: Western Australia
- 2014/15–2015/16: Perth Scorchers
- 2016/17–present: Victoria (squad no. 14)
- 2016/17–2022/23: Melbourne Renegades (squad no. 21)
- 2021: Leicestershire (squad no. 4)
- 2022–2023: Gloucestershire (squad no. 21)
- 2023/24: Perth Scorchers (squad no. 14)
- 2024: Leicestershire (squad no. 14)
- 2024/25: Melbourne Renegades (squad no. 14)
- 2025–present: Lancashire (squad no. 12)

Career statistics
Competition	Test	FC	LA	T20
Matches	14	209	99	57
Runs scored	607	13,899	3,380	1,051
Batting average	25.29	39.15	36.34	19.46
100s/50s	0/3	35/61	3/22	0/4
Top score	79	250*	142*	85
Catches/stumpings	8/–	107/–	30/–	20/–
Medal record
Men's Cricket
Representing Australia
ICC World Test Championship
Winner	2021–2023
- Source: ESPNcricinfo, 23 October 2026

Marcus Sinclair Harris (born 21 July 1992) is an Australian cricketer who has represented Australia in Test cricket. A left-handed opening batter, Harris plays for Victoria and Lancashire in domestic cricket. He made his Test debut for the Australia national cricket team in December 2018 against India. He was a member of the Australian team that won the 2023 ICC World Test Championship final.

== Cricket career ==
=== Western Australia ===
Harris began playing first-class cricket for Western Australia in the 2010–11 summer. His maiden first-class century came in just his third match, when he made 157 against Queensland. This made him the youngest Australian to score a first class 150, breaking a 115-year-old record set by Clem Hill. Harris played semi-regularly for Western Australia over the next six years, and was even named man of the match in the 2014–15 Sheffield Shield final for scoring 81 and 158 in his two innings. Harris played more than 40 Sheffield Shield matches for Western Australia and scored more than 2,000 runs for the team, but he'd only kept a batting average of 28.43 and scored just four centuries in that time. Harris also played for the Twenty20 team the Perth Scorchers, playing 14 Big Bash League (BBL) matches to score 192 runs at an average of 19.41.

Harris had a particularly poor 2015–16 season. In the Sheffield Shield he had mixed results, scoring a century but only totaling 274 runs at an average of 27.40, and his BBL form was woeful with just 69 runs from 6 innings. His performances for the Western Australian teams frustrated coach Justin Langer, who said he was "mediocre with flashes of brilliance". In Australia's national List A competition, the Matador BBQs One-Day Cup, Harris wasn't even chosen to be in Western Australia's team at all. He was instead picked up by the young Cricket Australia XI. At the end of the season Harris left Western Australia to play for Victoria.

=== Victoria ===
The move to Victoria proved to be very successful for Harris. In December 2016 he was the leading run-scorer in the 2016–17 Sheffield Shield season with 409 runs at an average of 68.16. Victoria made the Sheffield Shield final, in which Harris scored a century and was part of a Shield final record-breaking opening partnership of 224 runs with Travis Dean on the first day. Harris credited his newfound form with the move to Victoria, saying that the Victorian system suited him better and it was useful to have more experienced players around him than he had had in Western Australia.

In the absence of Steve Smith, David Warner and Cameron Bancroft from the Australian Test team following the 2018 ball-tampering scandal, Harris gained his first opportunity to play Test cricket for Australia. In a Sheffield Shield match against New South Wales in October 2018, Harris helped Victoria to recover from a poor start of 2/6 with an unbeaten 250, the best score of his first-class career. This innings put him into contention for one of the vacant spots at the top of Australia's batting order. In the first four matches of the Sheffield Shield season, he scored a further two half-centuries and averaged 87.40. After 25 first-class matches for Victoria, Harris had scored five centuries and averaged 47.58, and as a result of his improved consistency he was selected in Australia's Test squad for the first time.

On the 23 March 2019, Harris became the 49th man to achieve the rare milestone of scoring 1,000 shield runs in a season. He was the seventh Victorian to achieve this feat joining Chris Rogers, Matthew Elliott, Bill Ponsford, Graham Yallop, Dean Jones and David Hussey.

The left-hander went on to make a sublime 141 off 229 balls in the 2018–2019 Sheffield Shield final which was his third century from three Sheffield Shield finals. Victoria beat New South Wales by 177 runs to win their 32nd title and Harris was named Player of the Match.

Harris finished the 2018–2019 Sheffield Shield season as the competition's leading run scorer with a total of 1,188 runs at 69.88. He was awarded the Bill Lawry Medal as Victoria's best Sheffield Shield player and was also presented the John Scholes Award for exhibiting the best Victorian values.

On the 1 November 2020, Harris and Will Pucovski broke the 30-year record for the highest partnership in Sheffield Shield history. Harris and Pucovski combined for an astonishing 486-run opening stand against South Australia with both players recording double centuries. The openers broke the previous record partnership of 464 held by Steve and Mark Waugh, set in a Shield match between New South Wales and Western Australia in 1990.

Harris went on to win the Bill Lawry Medal for a second time as Victoria's best-performed player throughout the 2020–2021 Sheffield Shield season. He scored 695 runs at an average of 63, including two centuries.

=== County cricket ===
Harris experienced domestic cricket in England for the first time in 2021, representing Leicestershire in the County Championship and Royal London Cup. Appearing in eight County Championship matches, Harris made 655 runs at an average of 54.58; the sixth best average amongst players who played at least half of the tournament. He scored three centuries for the season, his highest score being 185 from 311 balls in a victory over Middlesex before Gloucestershire experienced his talent first-hand as he racked up 148 off 236 to lead his team to victory in early June.

In the 2021 Royal London Cup, Harris once again topped the averages for Leicestershire with 232 runs at 58.00 in his four appearances. That included a brilliant 127 against Yorkshire which followed a 75-run showing against Derbyshire.

Following the successful season with Leicestershire, Harris signed a two-year deal with Gloucestershire. He marked his debut for the county with a century against Yorkshire, going on to score 726 runs for the 2022 County Championship season at an average of 42.70 with three centuries.

Harris returned to Gloucestershire for the 2023 County Championship, fulfilling his two-year contract. He started the season with scores of 59 and 148 against Glamorgan.

In 2024 Harris rejoined Leicestershire for the first 5 matches of the 2024 County Championship.

In 2025, Harris signed for Lancashire. In May, Harris was appointed Captain for the County Championship following the resignation of Keaton Jennings, due to a poor start to the season. Harris signed a two-year contract extension with Lancashire in May 2025, extending his deal through the end of the 2027 season. In the 2025 County Championship, Harris scored 1,027 runs, averaging 60 and winning Lancashire's County Championship Player of the Year award.

=== Test career ===
Harris was first selected to join the Australian team ahead of the 2018–19 Border–Gavaskar Trophy. According to Harris, he received a text message from now Australian coach Justin Langer saying, "Welcome to the brotherhood, you little bastard". Harris and Langer both publicly denied media speculation that there was bad blood between them after Langer's comments when Harris had left Western Australia.

Let me squash this straightaway – Marcus Harris is like my little brother. I've known him at Scarborough Cricket Club since he was about 10 years old. Did I say [he was] mediocre with flashes of brilliance? Yeah I did, because that's what he was. That's the truth, look at it. ... What he's done [since leaving WA], to his great credit, is he's become a really consistent opening batsman with flashes of brilliance.

— Justin Langer

Harris made his Test debut on 6 December 2018, opening the batting alongside his Victorian teammate Aaron Finch, the least experienced pair to open the batting for Australia at Test level since the 1950s. He had his baggy green cap presented by Michael Hussey. Harris played in all four matches of the series against India, scoring 256 runs, including two half-centuries, at an average of 36.57, and he was Australia's most consistent batsman in the 2–1 series loss, but he wasn't able to score a century in any of the matches. Harris then under-performed in the subsequent series against Sri Lanka, potentially putting his place in the Test team at risk for the upcoming 2019 Ashes series.

Harris finished off the season playing for Victoria in the remaining matches of the 2018–19 Sheffield Shield season. In a match against Queensland he had innings of 95 and 174 to push his case, and then on the final day of the regular season he scored 65 runs against South Australia to take his season total up to 1,024 runs. In doing so, he became the first person to score 1,000 runs in a season for Victoria since Chris Rogers a decade earlier. Victoria made it to the Sheffield Shield final again, and Harris scored another century in the final to finish off the summer. Harris was given his first contract with Cricket Australia for the 2019–20 season.

He was named in Australia's squad for the 2019 Ashes series in England. He was omitted from the first two Tests, but recalled in place of Cameron Bancroft for the third Test. He failed to impress, scoring just 58 runs across the last three Tests at an average of less than 10, and was subsequently dropped for the 2019–20 home summer.

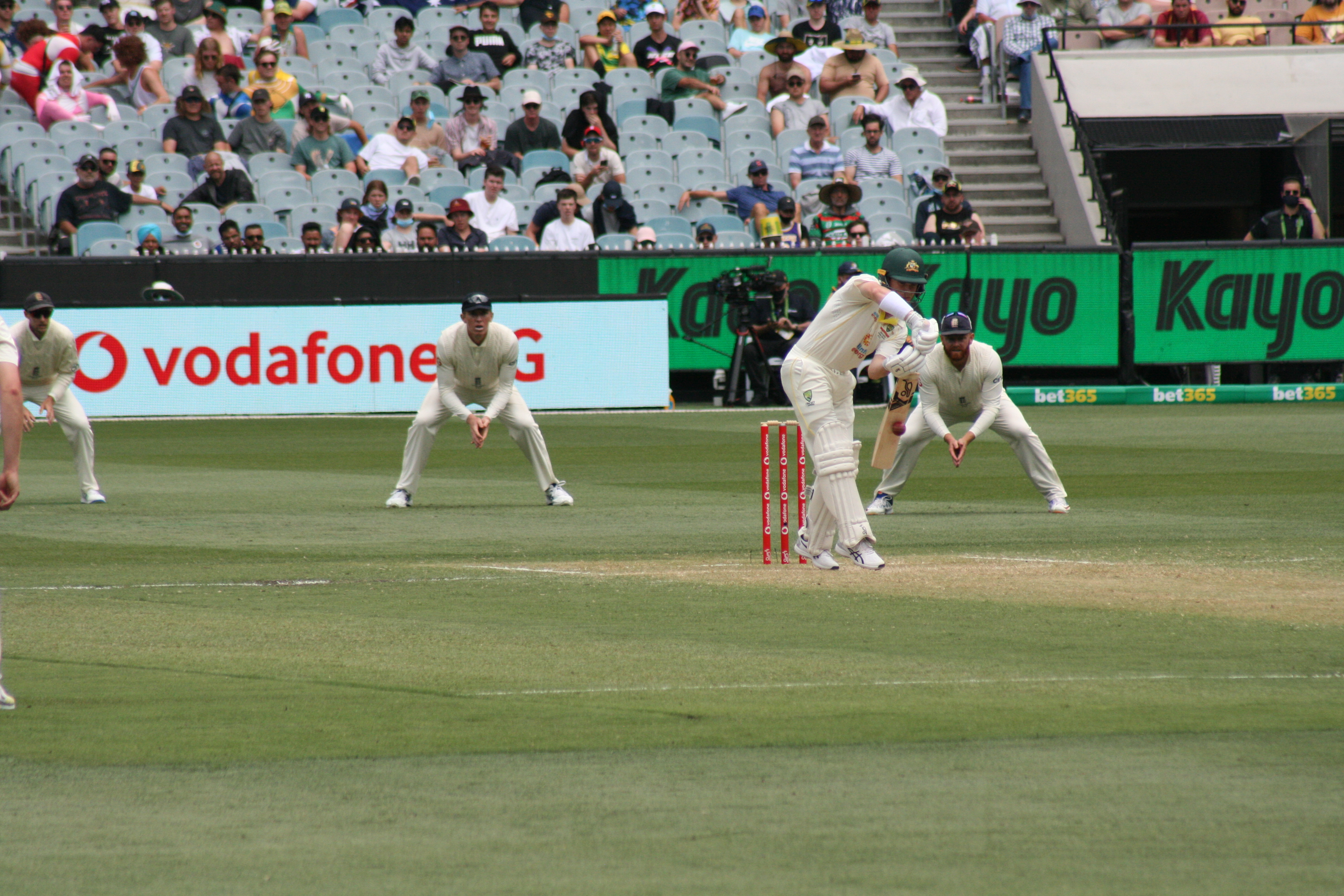
Harris batting during the 2021 Boxing Day Test at the MCG. He top scored for Australia with 76.

After a year on the outside, Harris was recalled to the Test team in 2021 following an injury to Will Pucovski. He featured in the fourth Test of the 2020–21 series against India, where he managed scores of 5 and 38. He was selected in Australia's squad for the 2021-22 Ashes series, featuring in the first four Tests. His best result was in the third test in Melbourne, where he top-scored with 76 runs. Harris was omitted for the final Test of the series.

Harris was selected in the Test squad for Australia's 2022–23 home summer, but did not feature in any Tests. He was not included in the squad for the 2023 Border–Gavaskar Trophy series, however he was awarded a Cricket Australia contract in April 2023, and later named in the Australian squad for the 2023 Ashes.

== Playing style ==
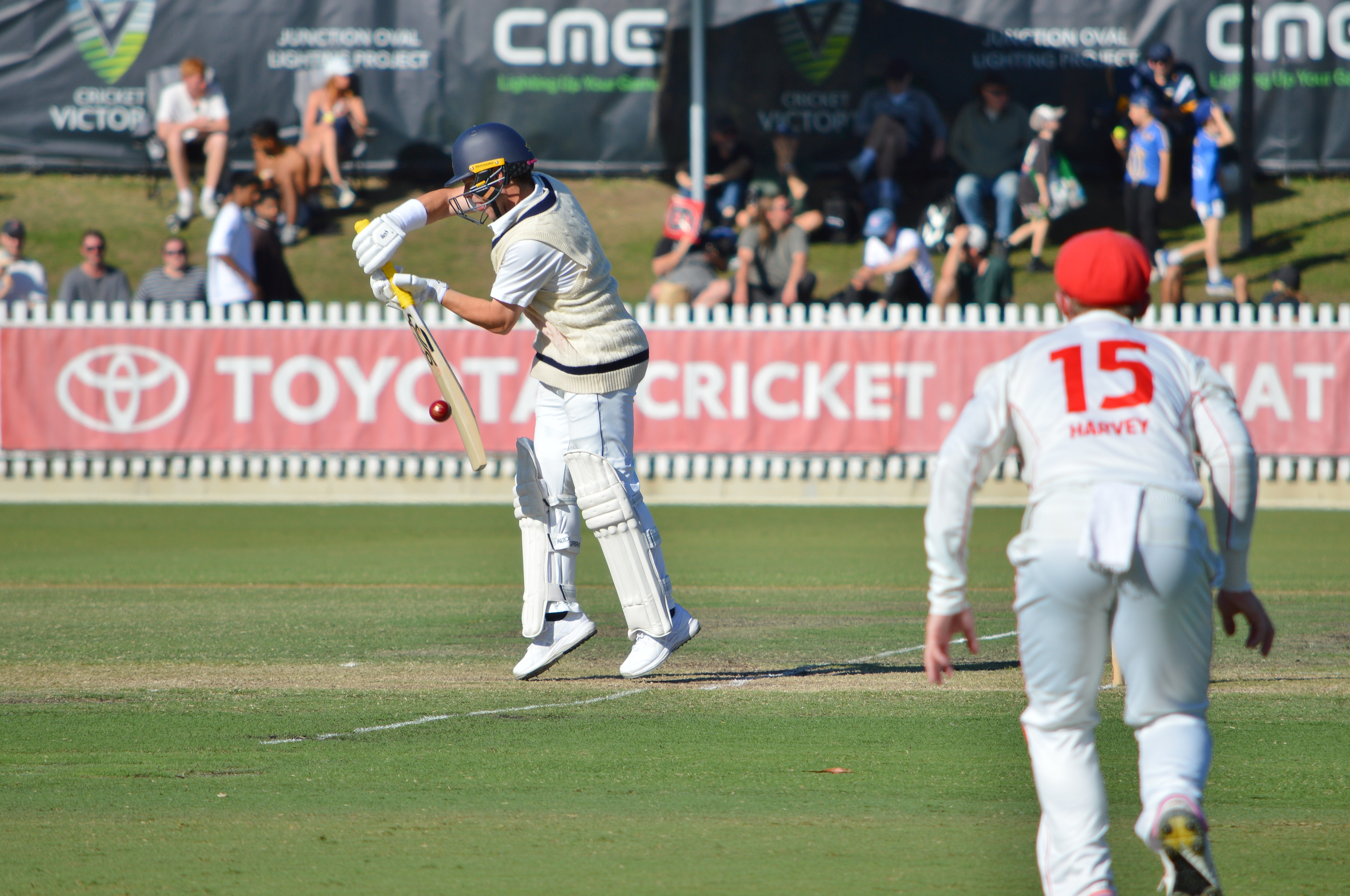
Marcus Harris during day four of the Sheffield Shield Final in March 2026

Harris' batting style is typical of Perth-raised opening batsmen, similar to Justin Langer and Chris Rogers. He has a variety of shots he can play well, particularly the cover drive and the pull and hook shots. He leaves the ball judiciously if he thinks it is outside the line of his off stump. Harris is comfortable at facing fast bowling. Harris' similarities with Langer were noted by former Australian coach Darren Lehmann following Harris' maiden first-class century. Harris has said that this is because the two of them came from the same club team in Perth and had the same batting coach.
