= Kurtis Patterson =

Australian cricketer (born 1993)

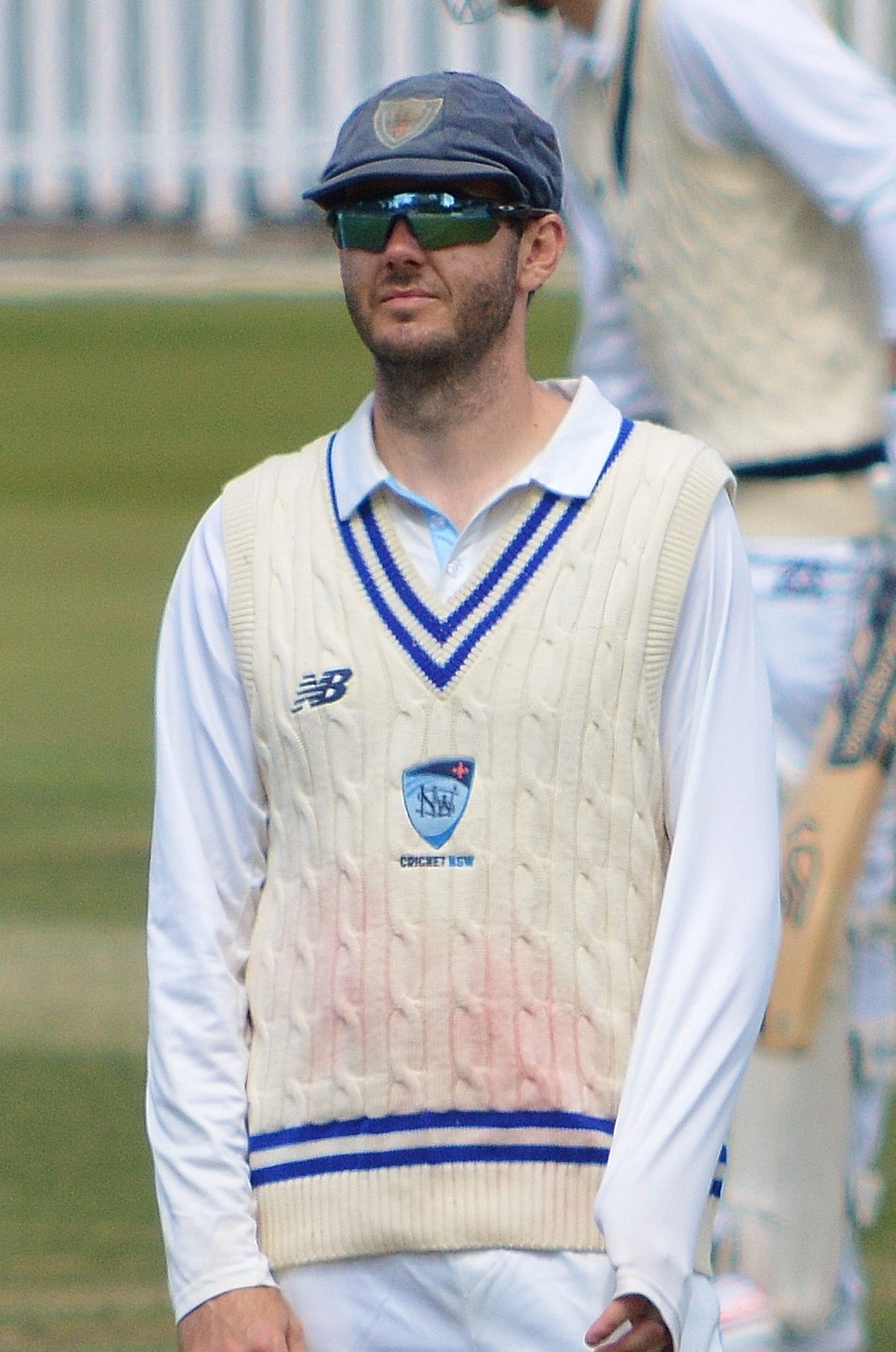
- Patterson playing First Class cricket for New South Wales in October 2025

Personal information
- Full name: Kurtis Robert Patterson
- Born: 5 May 1993 (age 33); Hurstville, New South Wales, Australia
- Nickname: Spoon
- Height: 192 cm (6 ft 4 in)
- Batting: Left-handed
- Bowling: Right-arm off break
- Role: Middle-order batsman

International information
- National side: Australia (2019)
- Test debut (cap 457): 24 January 2019 v Sri Lanka
- Last Test: 1 February 2019 v Sri Lanka

Domestic team information
- Years: Team
- 2011/12–present: New South Wales (squad no. 17)
- 2012/13: Sydney Sixers (squad no. 17)
- 2013/14–2017/18: Sydney Thunder (squad no. 17)
- 2019/20–2021/22: Perth Scorchers (squad no. 41)
- 2022/23-present: Sydney Sixers (squad no. 41)
- 2025: Surrey

Career statistics
Competition	Test	FC	LA	T20
Matches	2	122	75	65
Runs scored	144	7,602	2,231	1,264
Batting average	144.00	39.18	37.18	21.79
100s/50s	1/0	16/42	4/11	0/4
Top score	114*	173*	125*	78
Catches/stumpings	6/–	110/–	30/–	33/–
- Source: ESPNcricinfo, 23 October 2026

Kurtis Robert Patterson (born 5 May 1993) is an Australian cricketer who plays for the New South Wales cricket team in the Sheffield Shield, and the Sydney Sixers in the Big Bash League. Patterson scored a century on his first-class cricket debut for New South Wales in November 2011, becoming the youngest batsman to score a century in Sheffield Shield cricket. In January 2019, he made his Test debut for Australia against Sri Lanka, becoming the 457th person to play test cricket for Australia. He made a century in just his second test match in Canberra, also against Sri Lanka. He was not selected for the 2019 Ashes series and returned to play domestically in the 2019/2020 season. He has the highest average of any Test batsman who has lost their wicket at least once.

== Early life ==
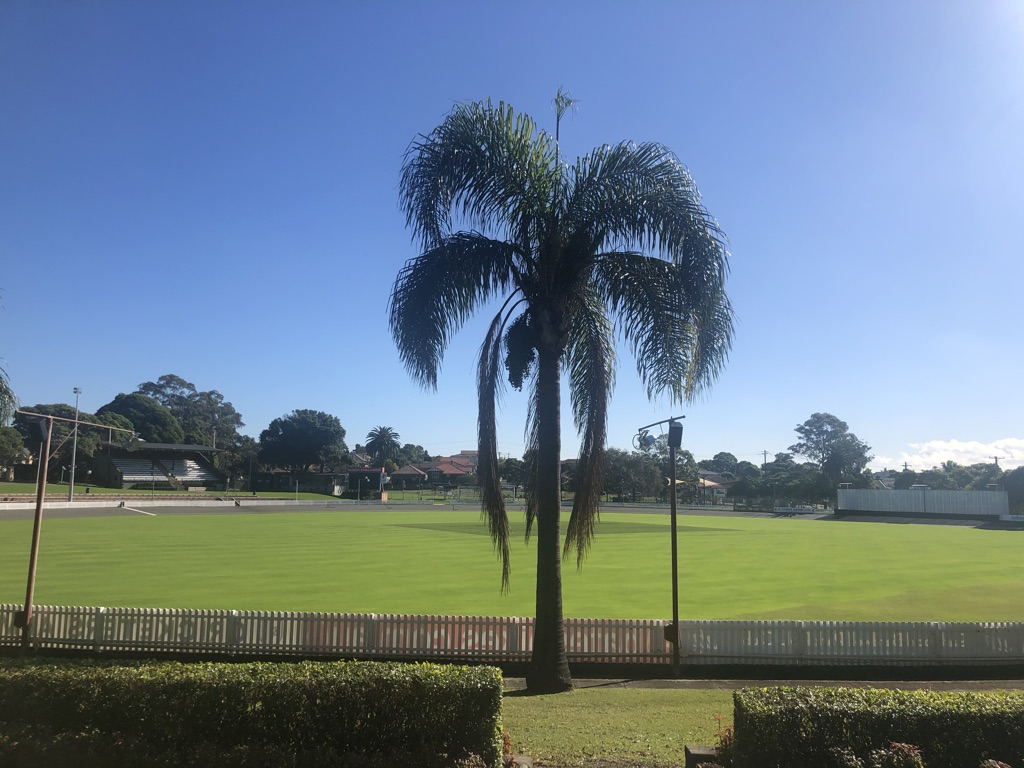
Hurstville Oval. Home ground of Patterson's club, St George

Kurtis Patterson was born in the Southern Sydney suburb of Hurstville and grew up in the Southern Sydney suburbs of Roselands and then Lugarno. He was born into a family with a strong sporting pedigree. His mum Dana played volleyball for Australia and his father Brad played cricket for Northern Districts in Sydney's first grade competition. Patterson went to high school at Christian Brothers in Lewisham. He played much of his junior cricket with St George Cricket Club. Aged 13, he played for St George in the AW Green Shield, which is Sydney's premier cricket competition for under 16s. Playing Green Shield again the following year, he scored a total of 442 runs at an average of 88.40. By the time he was 17, Patterson was playing first grade for St George. At the start of the 2011/2012 season, he scored two centuries in the first 4 rounds, which saw him be selected to make his debut for New South Wales.

== Domestic career ==
Patterson made his Sheffield Shield debut for New South Wales against Western Australia in November 2011. He made an immediate statement by scoring 157 in the first innings and remaining 6 not out in the second innings as New South Wales won the match by 6 wickets. This performance earned him the player of the match honours. His century in the first innings saw him become the youngest player to score a century in the Sheffield Shield. At the age of 18 years and 206 days he broke the record that was previously held by Barry Shepherd, who scored a century aged 18 years and 241 days in 1955. Despite this initial success, he was not selected to play for New South Wales for the rest of the season. Patterson returned to the New South Wales side during the 2013/2014 season, playing 7 out of 11 games. Throughout the season he scored a total of 403 runs at an average of 31.00. He scored 4 half-centuries during the season, including 52 in the final against Western Australia, which was won by New South Wales. Patterson produced similar statistics during the 2014/2015 season, scoring 372 runs at an average of 28.61.

Patterson's break out year came during the 2015/2016 season. Play all but one game, he scored a total of 737 runs at an average of 52.64, which included two centuries and four half-centuries. This made him the highest run-scorer for New South Wales that season and the 6th highest run-scorer in the whole competition. He was then selected for Australia A to play in a 2016 winter series against South Africa A and India A. In two unofficial test matches against South Africa A, Patterson made scores of 74, 6, 92, and 50 not out. This made him the highest scorer in the series among both sides. During this offseason, he also played 6 one day matches for Australia A in a quadrangular series against India A, South Africa A, and Australia's National Performance Squad. His stand-out performance in the series was a score of 115 against India A in a match that Australia A won by 1 run. Still aged just 23 and with a first-class batting average of 42.91, Patterson was now in contention for national selection. Before the start of the 2016/2017 season, former New South Wales and Australian wicketkeeper Brad Haddin said that Patterson could be in contention to play for Australia that summer. He furthered his case by scoring a century against Queensland in the first round of the 2016/2017 Sheffield Shield season. After this innings, New South Wales coach Trent Johnston said he believed Patterson was ready for test cricket and deserved a chance at international level. However, Patterson was not selected for Australia and played out the rest of the season in the Sheffield Shield. Although he did not score a century for the rest of the season, he still finished the season with 668 runs at an average of 44.53. This was followed by another strong domestic season in 2017/2018 where he scored 672 runs. This marked the second time in three years that Patterson was the highest run-scorer for New South Wales. Despite his consistent run scoring ability, questions began to be asked in the media about his ability to convert his half-centuries into bigger scores. However, in round 5 of the 2018/2019, he made a score of 107 not out against Western Australia, his first Sheffield Shield century since 2016. Between that time, he had scored a total of 14 half-centuries without scoring a century.

=== Domestic One-Day Career ===
Since 2013, Patterson has played for New South Wales in Australia's domestic one-day competition. In his first year playing in the competition, he played 7 out of 8 matches and made 152 runs at an average of 25.33 as New South Wales finished runners up in the competition. He following year he had a slightly improved season, scoring 230 runs at an average of 32.85. He had his most successful season in the 2016 competition when he averaged 49.40. In the final, Patterson scored 77 not out as New South Wales won the title. Just before the start of the 2018 competition, New South Wales captain Peter Nevill broke his thumb, and Patterson was named as the new captain. He had a difficult start as captain as New South Wales lost the first 3 games of the season. He also struggled individually, averaging 23.80 for the season. After being in contention for a Test call-up in the 2017–18 Ashes series, Patterson played every match for New South Wales in the 2017–18 JLT One-Day Cup, scoring two fifties and averaging 41.33 runs per innings to be one of the team's top run-scorers for the tournament. During the 2019 season, Patterson was hampered by a quad injury, playing only two matches in the competition.

=== Big Bash career ===
For the inaugural season of the Big Bash League, Australia's franchise Twenty20 competition, Patterson was offered a roster spot by the Sydney Thunder. However, he turned it down to focus on making the New South Wales Sheffield Shield side. In the second season of the Big Bash, Patterson was signed by the Sydney Sixers franchise for the 2012/2013 season. In his first season, he only played one game for the Sixers. The following season, he was signed by cross-town rivals the Sydney Thunder. Patterson was not regularly selected for the Thunder, playing only 9 games in each of the next three seasons. In later seasons of the Big Bash he began to play for games for the Thunder but failed to make a significant impact. In his time at the Thunder, he played a total of 25 matches in 8 seasons with a total of 438 runs and a high score of 48. Just before the start of the 2019/2020 Big Bash season, Patterson signed a 3-year deal with the Perth Scorchers. He missed the opening rounds of the season due to a hamstring injury. He finally made his debut for the Scorchers in January 2020, however, after scoring 38 runs in 3 matches, he was dropped for the remainder of the season due to lack of runs.

== International career ==
During the 2018/19 season, Patterson was selected to play for a Cricket Australia XI side against the touring Sri Lankans as a warm-up for the Test series. Patterson scored unbeaten centuries in both innings, with 157 not out in the first innings and 102 not out in the second innings. He was named the player of the match. Despite this performance against the Sri Lankans, the Australian squad for the Test series had already been named the previous week and Patterson had not been included. However the selectors backtracked and he was added to Australia's Test squad for the series against Sri Lanka. He made his Test debut for Australia against Sri Lanka on 24 January 2019. He had his baggy green cap presented to him by Michael Hussey. Batting at number 6, he made 30 off 82 balls in his first Test innings before being dismissed LBW. He was not required to bat in the second innings as Australia won by an innings and 40 runs. He also took three catches in the match, including a diving, one-handed catch in the gully to dismiss Dilruwan Perera. He was retained in the side for the second Test match in Canberra. In the second Test, he scored a century, the first of his Test career as Australia romped to a huge total, with Joe Burns and Travis Head also scoring centuries. Patterson finished with a score of 114 not out. With Travis Head also scoring his first Test century in the same innings, it was the first time since 1989 that two Australian batsmen had made their first Test centuries in the same innings. He did not bat in the second innings as Australia beat Sri Lanka by 366 runs, winning the series 2–0.

== 2019 Australia A tour of England ==
Following the conclusion of the Test series, Patterson returned to play for New South Wales in the Sheffield Shield. He finished the competition with a total of 724 runs, making him the 5th highest run-scorer for the season. This meant that Patterson was suddenly in contention for selection in the Australian side due to tour England for the 2019 Ashes series. Patterson was selected for the Australia A team that toured England in the lead up to the Ashes. These matches were considered to be crucial in deciding who would be selected for the Ashes. Before this tour, Patterson had only played 8 weeks of club cricket in England and he struggled to make runs. He scored 4, 32, and 28 for Australia A before scoring 2 and 0 in an intra-squad trial match. Ultimately, Patterson was not selected for the series, with Chairman of selectors Trevor Hohns saying Patterson was desperately unlucky to not be selected. Hohns also said the return of Steve Smith, David Warner, and Cameron Bancroft from their ball-tampering suspensions pushed players like Patterson out of the side.

== Injury and 2020 season ==
At the start of the 2019/2020 season, Patterson suffered a quadriceps injury playing grade cricket for St George. While he started the Sheffield Shield season for New South Wales, he reinjured his leg while fielding against Tasmania and missed several months of cricket. This injury also meant that Patterson did not have a chance to impress national selectors before the Australia test squad for the summer was named. On his return from injury, Patterson only played 3 matches for New South Wales before the COVID-19 pandemic caused the cancellation of the last round of the season. Patterson stated towards the end of the season that he did not think the injury was affecting his batting. He was also selected for Australia A against England Lions in February 2020. He top-scored with 94 not out in the second innings of the match.
