= Sean Abbott =

Australian cricketer (born 1992)

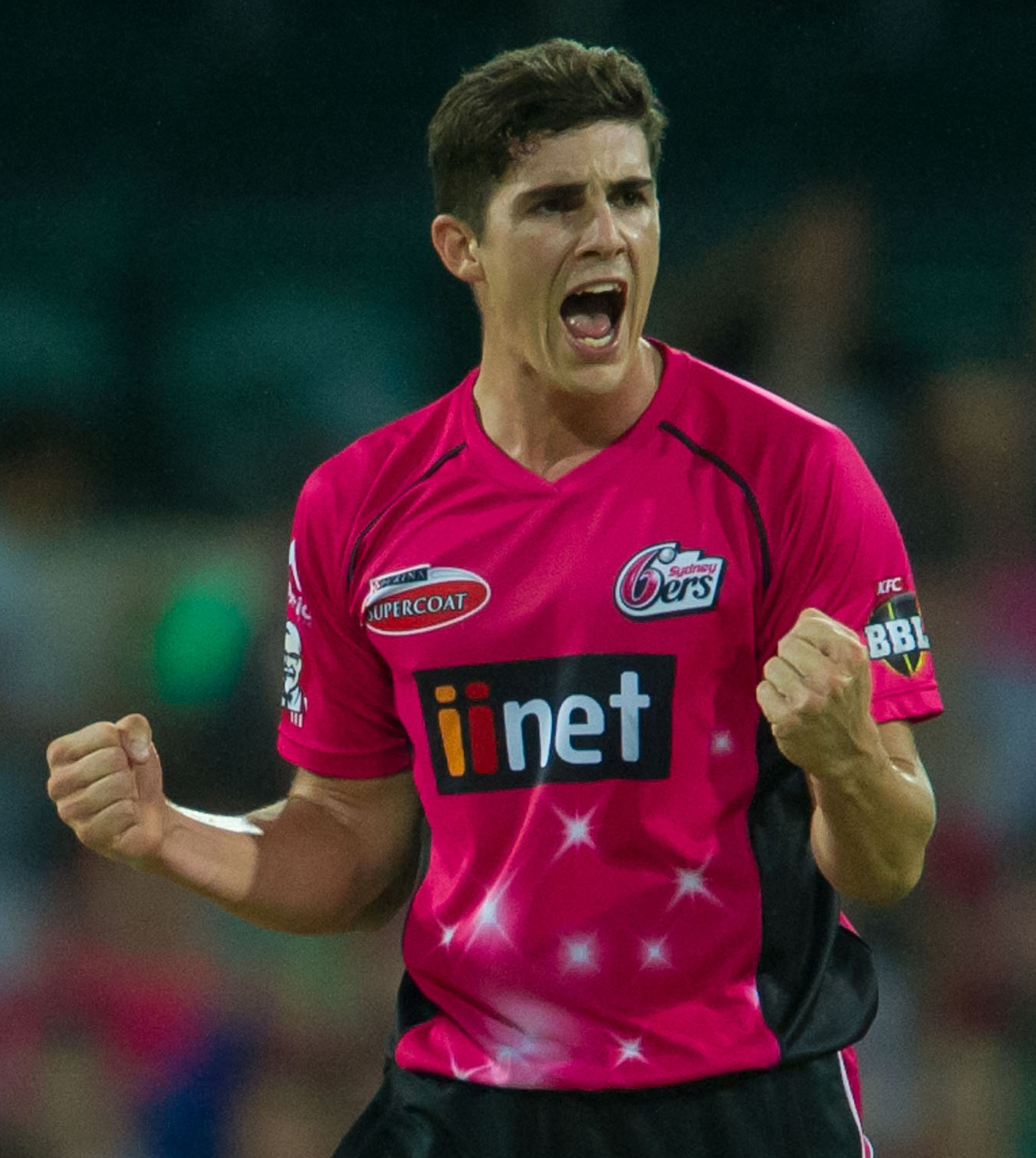
- Abbott in 2016

Personal information
- Full name: Sean Anthony Abbott
- Born: 29 February 1992 (age 34); Windsor, New South Wales, Australia
- Height: 184 cm (6 ft 0 in)
- Batting: Right-handed
- Bowling: Right-arm fast-medium
- Role: Bowling all-rounder

International information
- National side: Australia (2014–present)
- ODI debut (cap 205): 7 October 2014 v Pakistan
- Last ODI: 24 August 2025 v South Africa
- ODI shirt no.: 77
- T20I debut (cap 69): 5 October 2014 v Pakistan
- Last T20I: 31 January 2026 v Pakistan
- T20I shirt no.: 77

Domestic team information
- Years: Team
- 2010/11–present: New South Wales
- 2011/12–2012/13: Sydney Thunder
- 2013/14–present: Sydney Sixers
- 2015: Royal Challengers Bangalore
- 2021–2024; 2026: Surrey
- 2022: Sunrisers Hyderabad
- 2022: Manchester Originals
- 2024: Birmingham Phoenix
- 2025: Quetta Gladiators

Career statistics
Competition	ODI	T20I	FC	LA
Matches	29	29	101	104
Runs scored	374	50	3,182	1,131
Batting average	19.68	7.14	24.47	17.95
100s/50s	0/2	0/0	1/18	0/3
Top score	69	13*	102*	69
Balls bowled	1,331	550	17,978	4,710
Wickets	35	34	296	157
Bowling average	36.31	25.14	31.15	26.80
5 wickets in innings	0	0	9	2
10 wickets in match	0	0	0	0
Best bowling	3/23	4/31	7/45	5/43
Catches/stumpings	14/–	16/–	53/–	46/–
Medal record
Men's Cricket
Representing Australia
ICC Cricket World Cup
Winner	2023 India
- Source: ESPNcricinfo, 23 October 2026

Sean Anthony Abbott (born 29 February 1992) is an Australian international cricketer who represents the Australia national cricket team in ODI and T20I cricket as a bowling all-rounder who bats right-handed. He was a part of the Australian squad which won the 2023 Cricket World Cup.

== Early life ==
Abbott is originally from Windsor, New South Wales. After playing in junior cricket for Baulkham Hills Cricket Club, he progressed to play grade cricket for Parramatta District. Abbott completed his schooling at Gilroy College, Castle Hill.

== Domestic and T20 franchise career ==
Abbott made his List A debut for New South Wales against Western Australia at the Sydney Cricket Ground on 17 October 2010 in the 2010–11 Ryobi One-Day Cup, but neither bowled nor batted in the match. He made his first-class cricket debut exactly one year later, against South Australia at the Adelaide Oval.

Abbott has played for Parramatta and Sydney University in the Sydney Grade Cricket competition and both of the Sydney teams in the Big Bash League, the Sydney Thunder in the 2011–12 and 2012–13 seasons and the Sydney Sixers in 2013–14.

During a Sheffield Shield match on 25 November 2014, Abbott bowled a bouncer that hit Phillip Hughes on the neck. Hughes died two days later at St Vincent's Hospital, Sydney, as a result of a vertebral artery dissection, leading to subarachnoid haemorrhage. Many of the condolence messages included support for Abbott due to Hughes' death being an accident. He returned to training the day before Hughes' funeral, and returned to play against Queensland in a Sheffield Shield match starting on 8 December 2014, returning a match-winning 6/14 in Queensland's second innings.

In January 2015, Abbott was named as Australia's young cricketer of the year, spoken as the future fast bowler for Australia. Abbott was bought by Royal Challengers Bangalore in the 2015 auctions for 10,000,000 rupees (approx 200,000 AUD).

Abbott was named the Sydney Sixers Player of the Tournament in BBL|06 after taking 20 wickets over 10 games. He shared the award with Sixers batsmen Daniel Hughes.

On 28 August 2017, the Sixers announced that Abbott had re-signed with the club for three more editions of the Big Bash League. He played for New South Wales in the 2017–18 JLT One-Day Cup and took 12 wickets, the most of any player in the team.

Ahead of the 2019–20 Marsh One-Day Cup, Abbott was named as one of the six cricketers to watch during the tournament. In November 2020, in round four of the 2020–21 Sheffield Shield season, Abbott scored his maiden century in first-class cricket.

In April 2021, English county Surrey announced the signing of Abbott as their second overseas player for the season, specifically for the T20 Vitality Blast competition and also three County Championship matches. He made his first class Surrey debut on 27 May 2021 at The Oval against Gloucestershire. His time at Surrey was cut short by injury, but he signed again for the county in 2023.

In February 2022, he was bought by the Sunrisers Hyderabad in the auction for the 2022 Indian Premier League tournament. In April 2022, he was bought by the Manchester Originals for the 2022 season of The Hundred.

== International career ==
Abbott made his Twenty20 International debut for Australia against Pakistan in the United Arab Emirates on 5 October 2014. Two days later, he made his One Day International debut, also against Pakistan in the UAE. He then played in two more Twenty20 matches for Australia against South Africa in early November 2014.

He was awarded the Bradman Young Cricketer of the Year at the Allan Border Medal ceremony by the CA in 2015.

In 2019, Abbott made his return to Australia's international team after a five-year hiatus, taking 2/14 off his four overs against Pakistan at Optus Stadium. On 16 July 2020, Abbott was named in a 26-man preliminary squad of players to begin training ahead of a possible tour to England following the COVID-19 pandemic. On 14 August 2020, Cricket Australia confirmed that the fixtures would be taking place, with Abbott included in the touring party.

In November 2020, Abbott was named in Australia's Test squad for their series against India.

In July 2022, Abbott was named in the Australian squad for the ODI series against New Zealand and Zimbabwe In September 2022, Abbott was called up to the Australian squad for the T20I series against India.

In August 2023, Abbott was called up to the Australia squad for the T20I series against South Africa. He was also called up to the squad for the ODI series against South Africa and for the series against India.

In September 2023, Abbott was named in the Australia squad for the 2023 ODI World Cup in India. On 23 September, he scored his maiden international and ODI half century. He hit 54 runs off just 36 balls as Australia were defeated by 99 runs against India. On 11 November 2023, Abbott made his first ODI World Cup appearance against Bangladesh. He recorded figures of 2/61 in Australia's final group stage victory.

Abbott was included in the Australia squad in 2024 to play Scotland.
