= Steve Small =

Australian cricketer (born 1955)

Personal information
- Full name: Stephen Mark Small
- Born: 2 March 1955 (age 71); Sydney, Australia
- Batting: Left-handed
- Bowling: Slow left-arm orthodox
- Role: Batsman

Domestic team information
- Years: Team
- 1978/79 - 1981/82 1984/85 - 1992/93: New South Wales
- 1982/83 - 1983/84: Tasmania

Career statistics
Competition	FC	LA
Matches	90	39
Runs scored	5007	1021
Batting average	34.29	26.17
100s/50s	8/32	1/3
Top score	184	101
Balls bowled	30	-
Wickets	-	-
Bowling average	-	–
5 wickets in innings	-	–
10 wickets in match	-	–
Best bowling	-	–
Catches/stumpings	84/–	6/–
- Source: Cricinfo, 21 January 2021

Stephen Mark Small (born 2 March 1955) is an Australian former cricketer. He played first-class cricket for New South Wales and Tasmania.

== See also ==
- List of Tasmanian representative cricketers
- List of New South Wales representative cricketers
