= Marnus Labuschagne =

Australian cricketer (born 1994)

- Labuschagne in 2026

Personal information
- Born: 22 June 1994 (age 32); Klerksdorp, South Africa
- Height: 180 cm (5 ft 11 in)
- Batting: Right-handed
- Bowling: Right-arm medium-fast Right-arm leg break
- Role: Top-order batter

International information
- National side: Australia (2018–present)
- Test debut (cap 455): 7 October 2018 v Pakistan
- Last Test: 27 October 2026 v South Africa
- ODI debut (cap 229): 14 January 2020 v India
- Last ODI: 14 June 2026 v Bangladesh
- ODI shirt no.: 33
- Only T20I (cap 102): 5 April 2022 v Pakistan
- T20I shirt no.: 33

Domestic team information
- Years: Team
- 2014/15–present: Queensland (squad no. 33)
- 2016/17–present: Brisbane Heat (squad no. 33)
- 2019–2025: Glamorgan (squad no. 33)
- 2026: Hyderabad Kingsmen

Career statistics
Competition	Test	ODI	FC	LA
Matches	68	72	184	127
Runs scored	4,861	1,980	12,874	4,045
Batting average	42.64	33.55	42.77	36.44
100s/50s	11/25	2/13	34/63	7/27
Top score	215	124	215	135
Balls bowled	1,388	356	7,537	1,218
Wickets	15	11	99	25
Bowling average	58.00	35.18	46.00	51.04
5 wickets in innings	0	0	0	0
10 wickets in match	0	0	0	0
Best bowling	3/45	3/39	4/81	3/39
Catches/stumpings	52/–	42/–	164/–	69/–
Medal record
Men's cricket
Representing Australia
ICC Cricket World Cup
Winner	2023 India
ICC World Test Championship
Winner	2021–2023
Runner-up	2023–2025
- Source: Cricinfo, 1 October 2026

Marnus Labuschagne (/læbəˈʃeɪn/ or Afrikaans: [la.bəsˈkaχ.ni]; born 22 June 1994) is an Australian international cricketer who plays for the Australia national cricket team. He also captains Queensland and plays for the Brisbane Heat in the Big Bash League. Labuschagne was once ranked as high as no.1 in the Test batting rankings. He was a member of the Australian team that won the 2023 WTC and the 2023 ODI World Cup.

He represented Queensland at various levels in junior cricket, before making his first-class cricket debut in 2014. In August 2019, Labuschagne was the first cricketer to become a concussion substitute in a Test match, replacing Steve Smith. Labuschagne was the leading run-scorer in Test matches in 2019. He rose to fourth place in the ICC Player Rankings during the year, a rise of 106 places. In January 2020, Labuschagne was named as the ICC Men's Emerging Cricketer of the Year by the International Cricket Council (ICC), in February as Australia's Test player of the year, and in April as one of the five Cricketers of the Year by Wisden Cricketers' Almanack.

== Early life ==
Labuschagne was born in Klerksdorp, in South Africa's North West province, to South African parents. His family emigrated to Australia in 2004 when he was 10, after his father gained work in the mining industry, and Labuschagne attended school at Brisbane State High School. He grew up speaking Afrikaans, and only became fluent in English after moving to Australia. In 2021, he revealed that in November 2010, he worked at The Gabba, Brisbane, as a Hot Spot infrared camera operator for Channel 9, and witnessed Peter Siddle's hat-trick during the 2010–11 Ashes series, on Siddle's 26th birthday.

== Domestic career ==
A right-handed batsman, Labuschagne played for Queensland at under-12, under-15, under-17, and under-19 level, and captained the team at the 2012–13 National Championships. In Brisbane Grade Cricket, he plays for Easts-Redlands District Cricket Club. He spent 2013 playing club cricket in England for Plymouth in the Devon Premier League and played for Sandwich Town Cricket Club in the Kent Premier League in 2014, scoring prolifically for both teams. His 1,049 runs scored for Sandwich Town in the 2014 season set a new Kent Premier League record for runs scored by a batter in a single season, overtaking the previous record of 1,012 set by former-Australia coach Justin Langer in 1992 whilst representing Dover Cricket Club.

After playing just once for Queensland Academy, Labuschagne made his first-class cricket debut in the first round of the 2014–15 Sheffield Shield season against South Australia at the Adelaide Oval. Opening the batting with Joe Burns, he scored 83 runs in Queensland's first innings, featuring in a 99-run fourth-wicket partnership with Nick Stevens. Later in the 2014–15 season, Labuschagne was used as a substitute fielder for the Australian national team in the second Test against India at the Gabba, taking a low catch at short leg.

Labuschagne made his List A debut for Queensland in the 2015 One-Day Cup in October 2015 and scored his maiden first-class century in the following month, making 112 runs in his eighth Sheffield Shield match. He scored 273 runs at a batting average of 45 in the 2016 One-Day Cup and was named player of the tournament.

In September 2017, during a 2017 One-Day Cup match between Queensland and Cricket Australia XI, he became the first fielder to be penalised under the newly introduced Law designed to stop fielders deceiving batsmen. Labuschagne dived to field a ball in the covers, and although he failed to stop the ball he feigned throwing to the wicket-keeper. His team was penalised five runs.

After being Queensland's leading run-scorer in the 2017–18 Sheffield Shield, Cricket Australia named him in their Sheffield Shield team of the season.

In April 2021, Labuschagne scored 192 in the 2020–21 Sheffield Shield season final against New South Wales. Queensland winning by an innings and 33 runs.

In June 2024, Labuschagne was formally announced as Queensland Bulls state captain for both Sheffield Shield and One-Day Cup, having previously filled the role on two occasions in 2023 in One-Day Cup and Sheffield Shield matches against South Australia.

In the 2024–25 Sheffield Shield season, Labuschagne switched from his part-time legspin to bowling medium pace in the lead-up to the Test series against India.

=== County cricket ===
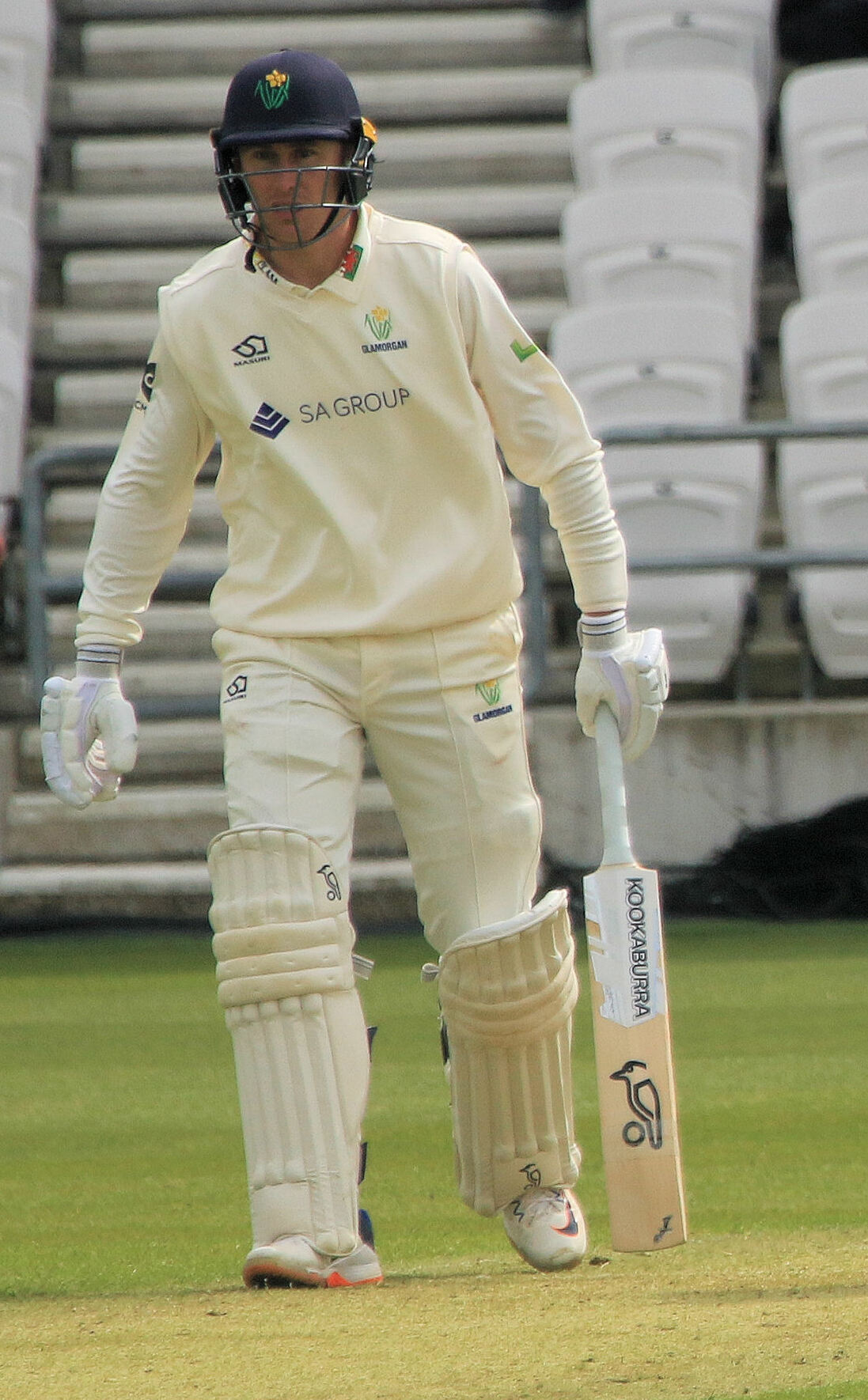
Labuschagne playing for Glamorgan (2023).

In April 2019, Labuschagne signed for Glamorgan County Cricket Club for the 2019 English cricket season. He made 1,114 runs in his first County Championship season, including three centuries in his first four first-class matches – one of which was a then career-best 182 against Sussex in a Glamorgan record second-wicket partnership of 291. He was the second-highest scorer in the Second Division of the County Championship, despite only playing in ten matches, and topped Glamorgan's batting averages with an average of 61.89 runs per innings. He also took 19 wickets with a bowling average of 38.11. In November 2019, he re-signed for Glamorgan for the next two seasons following his performances in the 2019 Ashes.

In June 2020, Labuschagne's contract was extended for an extra season following the disruption of the 2020 season due to the COVID-19 pandemic.

== International career ==
=== Tour of UAE against Pakistan 2018–19 ===
In September 2018, he was named in Australia's Test squad for their series against Pakistan. He made his Test debut for Australia against Pakistan on 7 October 2018, scoring a two-ball duck in his first innings and 13 runs in his second. He also took two wickets on debut. He had his baggy green cap presented by Michael Hussey. In the second Test, he took another five wickets and made scores of 25 and 43, top scoring in Australia's second innings.

=== India and Sri Lanka in Australia 2018–19 ===
Marnus was named in the Australian One Day International squad in December 2018 ahead of the team's tour of India the following year before he was surprisingly added to the Australian Test squad for the fourth Test match against the touring Indians at the start of the year. He was selected to bat at number three in the batting order, a decision which was "heavily criticised" at the time. He scored 38 runs in his only innings and was retained in the team for the two Tests against Sri Lanka at the end of the summer.

=== Ashes in England 2019 ===
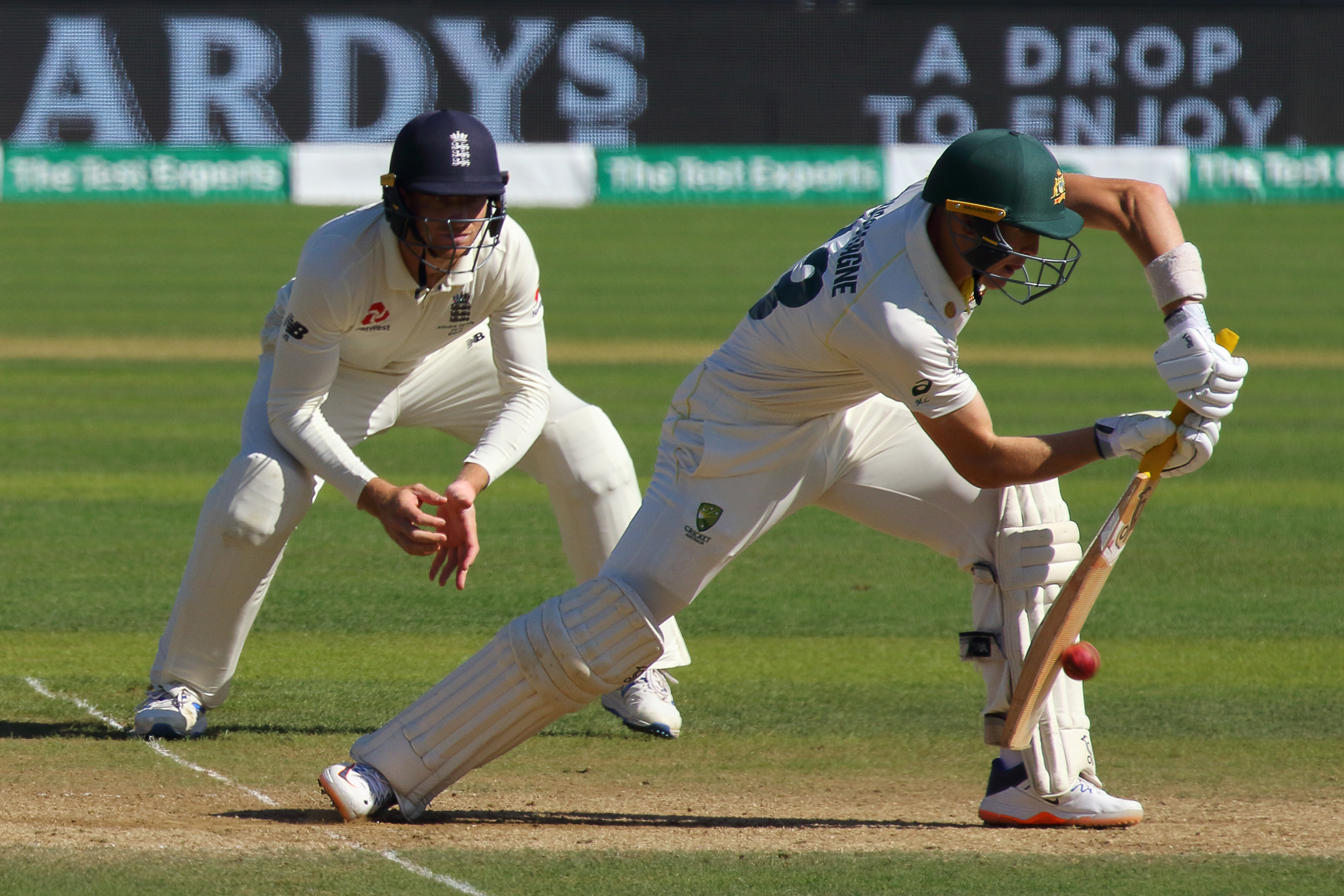
Labuschagne batting for Australia in the 2019 Ashes series

After showing good early season form for Glamorgan in county cricket, he was named in Australia's squad for the 2019 Ashes series in England. On 18 August 2019, Labuschagne replaced Steve Smith on day five of the second Test, after Smith suffered a concussion on the previous day – becoming the first player to be concussion substitute in a Test match following a change in the International Cricket Council's (ICC) regulations. Players substituted in this way are intended to be a "like for like" replacement, a role he "took very seriously". He went on to score 59 runs, the highest in the Australian second innings, and was selected for the third Test in Smith's absence, top-scoring in both Australian innings, batting in a style which was described as "exceptionally doughty, brave and intelligent batting". After England were bowled out for 67 in their first innings, Labuschagne became the fifth batsman in Test history to make two scores in a match higher than the total scored by the opposing team in one of their innings.

=== Pakistan and New Zealand in Australia 2019–20 ===
Labuschagne retained his place in the Australian team for the visit of Pakistan the following summer, scoring 185, his maiden Test century, at the Gabba. He scored another century in the second Test before scoring a third in the first Test against New Zealand in December. Having made three consecutive centuries, he made half-centuries in his next two innings before starting 2020 by making his first double-century in the third Test against New Zealand at the SCG, scoring 215 runs. He finished 2019 as the year's highest Test match run-scorer, having made 975 of his 1,104 Test runs in the year after his appearance as a concussion substitute in August. During the year he rose 106 places to become the fourth-ranked batsman on the ICC rankings.

=== Tours of India and South Africa 2019–20 ===
In December 2019, Labuschagne was named in Australia's ODI squad for their 2020 tour of India. He made his ODI debut on 14 January; Australia won the match by ten wickets with Labuschagne not batting or bowling in the game. He played the remaining two ODIs of the series, scoring a maiden ODI half-century in the third match.

After being retained in the Australian squad for their tour of South Africa, he scored his first ODI century in March, making 108 runs at Potchefstroom, close to his hometown. In April 2020, Cricket Australia awarded Labuschagne with a central contract ahead of the 2020–21 season. On 16 July 2020, Labuschagne was named in a 26-man preliminary squad of players to begin training ahead of a possible tour to England following the COVID-19 pandemic. On 14 August 2020, Cricket Australia confirmed that the fixtures would be taking place, with Labuschagne included in the touring party.

=== New Zealand in Australia 2020 ===
New Zealand returned to Australia after the Test series, with games scheduled to be held on the 13, 15 and 20 March 2020. The first match was won by Australia, with a winning margin of 71 runs as Labuschagne made 56. However, due to the COVID-19 pandemic, the 2nd and 3rd matches were cancelled without a ball being bowled due to travel restrictions.

In February 2022, Labuschagne was named in Australia's Twenty20 International (T20I) squad for their one-off match against Pakistan. He made his T20I debut on 5 April 2022, for Australia against Pakistan.

=== 2021-22 Ashes Series in Australia ===
This series was Labuschagne's first Ashes series at home, in which he played all 5 Test matches, and scored 335 runs with the bat across the series at an average of 41.87. During the 2nd Test at Adelaide Oval, in Australia's first innings, he scored a 103-run century off a patient 305 balls. In the 2nd innings of the same Test, he scored 51 runs off 96 balls, leading to him being named the Player Of The Match.

=== Ashes in England 2023 ===
Labuschagne scored 328 runs at 32.8 with a century in the 4th Test. This was just his second century scored outside of Australia.

=== 2023 Cricket World Cup ===
He was selected in Australia's squad for the 2023 World Cup. He scored a match-winning half century in the World Cup Final against India to take his team home.

=== India in Australia 2024–25 ===
Ahead of the first test of the series, there was a lot of speculation about the form of Labuschagne. This intensified following his performance where he batted poorly in both innings. To make matters worse, Labuschagne was also criticized for his bowling.

=== 2025-26 Ashes Series in Australia ===
Before the beginning of the 2025-26 Ashes series, there was a discussion of whether or not Labuschagne should be a part of the Test team for the series, as his form of the last 6 months had not been up to par. But in the two months coming up the series, Labuschagne found incredible form, scoring two centuries in the Sheffield Shield of 160 and 159 in October, and 3 more centuries in the Dean Jones Trophy of 130, 105, and 101 in September October and November. Because of the incredible form, he was selected for the series. He played all 5 Test matches, and put up 259 runs with the bat at an average of 28.77, scoring 2 50's. In the 3rd Test in Adelaide, during England's second innings with the bat, he made two spectacular catches to dismiss Ollie Pope and later Will Jacks, helping Australia to victory in the match and clinching the series.

=== Australia in Pakistan and Bangladesh 2026 ===
In 2026, Australia toured Pakistan and he made unremarkable scores. In the first ODI, he was dismissed for a two ball duck, after being trapped and given lbw to Arafat Minhas. In the second ODI, he made 5 runs off 12 balls, failing to make an impact once again whilst trying to hit the ball hard, but top-edging it straight to a fielder. In the third ODI, he fell cheaply once more, scoring 19 runs off 31 balls.

After touring Pakistan, Australia toured Bangladesh. After just the first ODI, doubts began to arise about his form and statistical analysis revealed that he had averaged 11.64 in his previous 14 ODI innings. It was also shown that in his last 7 innings he had averaged just 4.5, and scored 25 runs. Critics also noticed that his fear of getting out made him afraid to attack bowlers.

=== Test records ===
In December 2022, on West Indies tour of Australia, Labuschagne achieved the 3000 run landmark, and became the joint second-fastest batter to achieve this feat. He took 51 innings to accomplish the landmark, equalling West Indies' batter Everton Weekes.

=== Achievements ===
- ICC Men's Test Team of the Year: 2019, 2021, 2022
- Shane Warne Men's Test Player of the Year: 2020
- ICC Men's Emerging Cricketer of the Year: 2019

== Personal life ==
Labuschagne married his wife, Rebekah, on 26 May 2017. Their first child, a daughter was born on 20 September 2022. They have a chocolate Labrador named 'Milo' who has been known to make appearances on Labuschagne's Instagram playing backyard cricket.

Labuschagne was brought up in a Christian household and committed to the faith aged 17. He has spoken publicly about how his Christian faith provides stability amid the ups and downs of professional cricket.

Labuschagne has a strong love for coffee, having completed a barista course at the age of 21. He has been known to take his commercial grade coffee machine away on tour with the Australian Cricket Team. On the tour to Pakistan, he also took 30 kg of coffee beans and 1000L of oat milk for the team.

Away from the field, Labuschagne has been known to hone his batting skills with home-made games in his backyard. In preparation for the 2022 Australian tour of Pakistan, he was seen practising batting on his home balcony in Brisbane on a rubber mat laden with pieces of taped aluminium and metal sheeting to try to emulate the variable bounce and turn of Pakistani wickets.

Labuschagne is a supporter of National Rugby League club the Brisbane Broncos and Australian Football League club the Brisbane Lions.

== Statistics ==
T20 Franchise Statistics
Team	Season	League		Batting					Bowling					Fielding
Team	Season	Competition	Matches	Innings	Runs	Average	High score	100s / 50s	Overs	Wickets	Runs	Economy	Average	Catches
Brisbane Heat	2016/17	BBL	3	2	21	1.00	20	0 / 0	4	1	54	13.50	54.00	4
Brisbane Heat	2017/18	BBL	3	3	21	7.00	20	0 / 0	1	0	5	5.00	—	0
Brisbane Heat	2018/19	BBL	1	1	0	0.00	0	0 / 0	0	0	0	—	—	0
Brisbane Heat	2019/20	BBL	3	3	55	18.33	28	0 / 0	1	0	11	11.00	—	0
Brisbane Heat	2020/21	BBL	6	6	176	29.33	49	0 / 0	17	10	146	8.59	14.60	2
Brisbane Heat	2021/22	BBL	1	1	3	3.00	3	0 / 0	3	1	23	11.00	23.00	1
Brisbane Heat	2022/23	BBL	8	8	192	24.00	73	0 / 1	1	0	20	11.00	—	4
Brisbane Heat	2023/24	BBL	2	2	75	37.50	45	0 / 0	0	0	0	—	—	0
Brisbane Heat	2024/25	BBL	1	1	77	77.0	77	0/1		0	4	23.00		
Brisbane Heat	Total		28	27	620	23.84	77	0 / 2	25	12	259	10.36	21.58	11
Glamorgan	2021	T20 Blast	8	8	390	48.75	93*	0 / 4	22	9	193	8.77	21.44	5
Glamorgan	2022	T20 Blast	6	5	118	23.60	41	0 / 0	12	3	103	8.58	34.33	3
Glamorgan	Total		14	13	508	39.08	93*	0 / 4	34	12	296	8.71	24.67	8
Career Total			41	39	1051	26.95	93*	0 / 5	59	24	555	9.41	23.13	19

Statistics are correct to 11 January 2024

== International centuries ==
As of September 2023, Labuschagne has scored 11 centuries in Test matches and two in ODIs.

Test centuries scored by Labuschagne
No.	Score	Against	Pos.	Venue	Date	Result
1	185	Pakistan	3	The Gabba, Brisbane	21 November 2019	Won
2	162	Pakistan	3	Adelaide Oval, Adelaide	29 November 2019	Won
3	143	New Zealand	3	Perth Stadium, Perth	12 December 2019	Won
4	215	New Zealand	3	Sydney Cricket Ground, Sydney	3 January 2020	Won
5	108	India	3	The Gabba, Brisbane	15 January 2021	Lost
6	103	England	3	Adelaide Oval, Adelaide	16 December 2021	Won
7	104	Sri Lanka	3	Galle International Stadium, Galle	8 July 2022	Lost
8	204	West Indies	3	Perth Stadium, Perth	30 November 2022	Won
9	104*	West Indies	3	Perth Stadium, Perth	30 November 2022	Won
10	163	West Indies	3	Adelaide Oval, Adelaide	8 December 2022	Won
11	111	England	3	Old Trafford, Manchester	19 July 2023	Drawn

ODI centuries scored by Labuschagne
No.	Score	Against	Pos.	Venue	Date	Result
1	108	South Africa	4	Senwes Park, Potchefstroom	7 March 2020	Lost
2	124	South Africa	4	Mangaung Oval, Bloemfontein	9 September 2023	Won
