= 2018–19 Sheffield Shield season =

Cricket tournament

2018–19 Sheffield Shield
- Dates: 16 October 2018 – 1 April 2019
- Administrator: Cricket Australia
- Cricket format: First-class
- Tournament format(s): Double round-robin and final
- Champions: Victoria (32nd title)
- Participants: 6
- Matches: 31
- Player of the series: (Victoria (state)) Scott Boland (Victoria)
- Most runs: (Victoria (state)) Marcus Harris (Victoria) (1188)
- Most wickets: Trent Copeland (New South Wales) (52)

The 2018–19 Sheffield Shield season was the 117th season of the Sheffield Shield, the Australian domestic first-class cricket competition. The season started on 16 October 2018. For the first time in six seasons, the competition featured no day/night matches. The first five rounds took place prior to the international Test series against India, and in addition the season breaks for the Big Bash League.

Queensland were the defending champions. The final will include the use of the bonus point system that is used during the rest of the competition, in the event that the match ends in a draw.

New South Wales faced Victoria in the Sheffield Shield final at Junction Oval in Melbourne. Victoria beat New South Wales by 177 runs to win their 32nd title.

== Points table ==
Team	Pld	W	L	D	NR	BP	Pts
Victoria	10	6	1	3	0	18.98	57.98
New South Wales	10	5	2	3	0	13.72	46.72
Western Australia	10	5	3	2	0	11.90	43.90
Queensland	10	3	5	2	0	11.82	31.82
Tasmania	10	3	5	2	0	11.59	30.59
South Australia	10	0	6	4	0	12.51	16.51

== Fixtures ==
=== Round 1 ===
16–19 October 2018
Scorecard

New South Wales	v	South Australia (home team)
246 (76.1 overs); Daniel Hughes 60 (162); Joe Mennie 5/39 (20 overs)		273 (108.2 overs); Jake Lehmann 61 (123); Trent Copeland 6/86 (30 overs)
8/279d (86 overs); Peter Nevill 72* (147); Chadd Sayers 5/101 (25 overs)		6/103 (44.3 overs); Jake Lehmann 33* (126); Sean Abbott 3/29 (13.3 overs)

Match drawn
Adelaide Oval, Adelaide
Umpires: Shawn Craig and Simon Fry
Player of the match: Trent Copeland (New South Wales)

- South Australia won the toss and elected to field.
- There was no play in the first two sessions of day 1 due to rain.
- There was no play in the first session of day 2 due to rain.
- Rain delayed the start of play on day 3.
- Rain delayed the start of the second session on day 4.
- Lloyd Pope (South Australia) and Jack Edwards (New South Wales) both made their first-class debuts.

16–19 October 2018
Scorecard

Tasmania	v	Queensland (home team)
355 (116.3 overs); Alex Doolan 115 (193); Peter George 4/76 (30 overs)		148 (77 overs); Jimmy Peirson 42 (71); Jackson Bird 5/35 (19 overs)
132 (52.4 overs); Matthew Wade 51 (114); Mitchell Swepson 3/17 (10.4 overs)		93 (29.2 overs); Joe Burns 16 (21); Jackson Bird 5/42 (13 overs)

Tasmania won by 246 runs
The Gabba, Brisbane
Umpires: Simon Lightbody and Gerard Abood
Player of the match: Jackson Bird (Tasmania)

- Queensland won the toss and elected to field.
- Rain delayed the start of play on day 1.
- Rain delayed the start of the second session on day 2.
- Nathan McSweeney (Queensland) made his first-class debut.

16–19 October 2018
Scorecard

(home team) Western Australia	v	Victoria
208 (48.4 overs); Marcus Stoinis 80 (114); Chris Tremain 4/37 (14 overs)		504 (112 overs); Will Pucovski 243 (311); Marcus Stoinis 4/73 (17 overs)
251 (70.5 overs); Josh Philippe 104 (142); Chris Tremain 5/100 (22.5 overs)

Victoria won by an innings and 45 runs
WACA, Perth
Umpires: Nathan Johnstone and Sam Nogajski
Player of the match: Will Pucovski (Victoria)

- Victoria won the toss and elected to field.
- Rain delayed play in the first session on day 3.
- Tea was called early on day 3 due to rain.
- There was no play in the final session of day 3 due to rain.
- Usman Qadir (Western Australia) was substituted in for Matthew Kelly after he suffered a concussion.
- Josh Philippe (Western Australia) scored his first century in first-class cricket.
- Will Pucovski (Victoria) scored his first double century in first-class cricket.

=== Round 2 ===
25–28 October 2018
Scorecard

New South Wales	v	Victoria (home team)
159 (61.4 overs); Kurtis Patterson 63 (147); Chris Tremain 5/47 (18 overs)		9/445d (147.2 overs); Marcus Harris 250* (403); Trent Copeland 3/74 (40.1 overs)
179 (86 overs); Nick Larkin 53 (79); Scott Boland 6/49 (26 overs)

Victoria won by an innings and 107 runs
Melbourne Cricket Ground, Melbourne
Umpires: John Ward and Michael Graham-Smith
Player of the match: Marcus Harris (Victoria)

- Victoria won the toss and elected to field.
- Marcus Harris (Victoria) scored his first double century in first-class cricket.

25–28 October 2018
Scorecard

Queensland	v	South Australia (home team)
231 (73.2 overs); Joe Burns 64 (108); Lloyd Pope 7/87 (22.2 overs)		505 (151.5 overs); Tom Cooper 178 (246); Brendan Doggett 4/82 (32 overs)
6/357 (138 overs); Sam Heazlett 118* (356); Joe Mennie 3/55 (24 overs)

Match drawn
Adelaide Oval, Adelaide
Umpires: Geoff Joshua and Tony Wilds
Player of the match: Tom Cooper (South Australia)

- Queensland won the toss and elected to bat.
- Lloyd Pope (South Australia) took his maiden five-wicket haul in first-class cricket and became the youngest bowler to take seven wickets in a Sheffield Shield innings.

25–28 October 2018
Scorecard

Tasmania	v	Western Australia (home team)
226 (64.1 overs); Alex Doolan 76 (135); Cameron Green 6/30 (11.1 overs)		243 (82.4 overs); Shaun Marsh 80 (140); Gabe Bell 3/45 (20 overs)
208 (82.3 overs); Jordan Silk 56 (140); Cameron Green 3/12 (14.3 overs)		3/195 (41 overs); Shaun Marsh 98 (92); Beau Webster 1/15 (3 overs)

Western Australia won by 7 wickets
WACA, Perth
Umpires: Greg Davidson and Phillip Gillespie
Player of the match: Shaun Marsh (Western Australia)

- Tasmania won the toss and elected to bat.

=== Round 3 ===
3-6 November 2018
Scorecard

South Australia	v	Victoria (home team)
244 (67.4 overs); Tom Cooper 118 (159); Scott Boland 7/54 (17 overs)		351 (124.2 overs); Peter Handscomb 123 (216); Joe Mennie 4/92 (27.2 overs)
230 (74.2 overs); Conor McInerney 63 (146); James Pattinson 3/24 (9 overs)		2/22 (10 overs); Travis Dean 10* (27); Joe Mennie 2/4 (2 overs)

Match drawn
Melbourne Cricket Ground, Melbourne
Umpires: David Shepard and Phillip Gillespie
Player of the match: Scott Boland (Victoria)

- South Australia won the toss and elected to bat
- There was no play on day 4 due to rain.

3-6 November 2018
Scorecard

(home team) Queensland	v	Western Australia
9/448d (129.5 overs); Matt Renshaw 89 (215); Matthew Kelly 3/80 (28 overs)		540 (172.2 overs); William Bosisto 167* (377); Mark Steketee 3/84 (25.2 overs)
2/135 (28 overs); Joe Burns 80* (85); Mitchell Marsh 1/33 (7 overs)

Match drawn
Allan Border Field, Brisbane
Umpires: Shawn Craig and Donovan Koch
Player of the match: William Bosisto (Western Australia)

- Queensland won the toss and elected to bat

5-8 November 2018
Scorecard

(home team) New South Wales	v	Tasmania
9/442d (144.4 overs); Jason Sangha 117 (223); Gabe Bell 3/75 (24.4 overs)		4/115d (49.3 overs); Alex Doolan 53 (108); Trent Copeland 4/27 (14.3 overs)
1/22d (4 overs); Daniel Hughes 21* (14)		7/264 (105.4 overs); Alex Doolan 90 (180); Nathan Lyon 4/88 (34.4 overs)

Match drawn
Sydney Cricket Ground, Sydney
Umpires: Greg Davidson and Simon Lightbody
Player of the match: Jason Sangha (New South Wales)

- New South Wales won the toss and elected to bat.
- Lunch was called early on day 3 due to rain.
- There was no play in the second session and final session of day 3 due to rain.

=== Round 4 ===
16-19 November 2018
Scorecard

(home team) New South Wales	v	Queensland
279 (80.2 overs); Moises Henriques 152 (178); Mark Steketee 4/38 (15.2 overs)		260 (88.4 overs); Marnus Labuschagne 52 (86); Nathan Lyon 4/83 (25.4 overs)
3/360d (91 overs); Nick Larkin 175* (290); Mitchell Swepson 2/133 (29 overs)		216 (59.3 overs); Jack Wildermuth 84 (91); Nathan Lyon 5/94 (25.3 overs)

New South Wales won by 163 runs
Manuka Oval, Canberra
Umpires: Greg Davidson and Geoff Joshua
Player of the match: Nick Larkin (New South Wales)

- New South Wales won the toss and elected to bat.

16-19 November 2018
Scorecard

(home team) South Australia	v	Western Australia
251 (83 overs); Travis Head 87 (118); Jhye Richardson 5/47 (22 overs)		207 (66.4 overs); Jhye Richardson 53 (53); Daniel Worrall 7/64 (21.4 overs)
268 (85.5 overs); Harry Nielsen 82 (134); Matthew Kelly 5/61 (17.5 overs)		5/313 (99 overs); Shaun Marsh 163* (264); Daniel Worrall 3/84 (27 overs)

Western Australia won by 5 wickets
Adelaide Oval, Adelaide
Umpires: John Ward and Simon Lightbody
Player of the match: Shaun Marsh (Western Australia)

- Western Australia won the toss and elected to field.

17-20 November 2018
Scorecard

(home team) Tasmania	v	Victoria
81 (29.5 overs); Jordan Silk 16 (22); Chris Tremain 5/13 (9.5 overs)		282 (94.4 overs); Cameron White 63 (121); Riley Meredith 4/61 (19.4 overs)
476 (147.1 overs); Matthew Wade 137 (194); Peter Siddle 4/100 (32.1 overs)		4/276 (83.1 overs); Marcus Harris 67 (145); Jackson Bird 2/65 (23.1 overs)

Victoria won by 6 wickets
Blundstone Arena, Hobart
Umpires: Tony Wilds and Michael Graham-Smith
Player of the match: Matthew Wade (Tasmania)

- Victoria won the toss and elected to field.

=== Round 5 ===
27-30 November 2018
Scorecard

Victoria	v	Queensland (home team)
167 (57.2 overs); Peter Handscomb 81 (126); Mark Steketee 4/52 (13.2 overs)		271 (80.1 overs); Joe Burns 96 (118); Peter Siddle 4/62 (22.1 overs)
191 (58 overs); Marcus Harris 62 (80); Mark Steketee 4/49 (11 overs)		2/90 (29.1 overs); Charlie Hemphrey 26* (32); Scott Boland 1/14 (6 overs)

Queensland won by 8 wickets
The Gabba, Brisbane
Umpires: Simon Lightbody and Tony Wilds
Player of the match: Joe Burns (Queensland)

- Queensland won the toss and elected to field.

27-30 November 2018
Scorecard

(home team) Tasmania	v	South Australia
185 (85.4 overs); Matthew Wade 43 (97); Daniel Worrall 4/42 (21.4 overs)		136 (51.2 overs); Travis Head 49 (100); Gabe Bell 4/29 (16.2 overs)
8/353d (123 overs); Jordan Silk 113 (253); Daniel Worrall 3/83 (29 overs)		213 (87.5 overs); Callum Ferguson 111 (246); Jackson Bird 4/65 (26 overs)

Tasmania won by 189 runs
Blundstone Arena, Hobart
Umpires: Donovan Koch and Phillip Gillespie
Player of the match: Jordan Silk (Tasmania)

- South Australia won the toss and elected to field.
- Alex Pyecroft (Tasmania) made his first-class debut.

27-30 November 2018
Scorecard

New South Wales	v	Western Australia (home team)
261 (88.3 overs); Kurtis Patterson 107* (221); Jhye Richardson 8/47 (20.3 overs)		198 (78.1 overs); Shaun Marsh 81 (193); Trent Copeland 4/52 (22.1 overs)
253 (81.1 overs); Moises Henriques 48 (76); Marcus Stoinis 3/43 (12 overs)		212 (51.3 overs); Marcus Stoinis 81 (96); Nathan Lyon 4/86 (22 overs)

New South Wales won by 104 runs
Optus Stadium, Perth
Umpires: Geoff Joshua and John Ward
Player of the match: Kurtis Patterson (New South Wales)

- Western Australia won the toss and elected to field.

=== Round 6 ===
7-10 December 2018
Scorecard

(home team) Victoria	v	Western Australia
9/424d (132.5 overs); Nic Maddinson 162 (293); David Moody 3/72 (27 overs)		296 (107.3 overs); Ashton Turner 80 (180); Jon Holland 5/65 (38.3 overs)
5/208d (57 overs); Travis Dean 68 (139); Matthew Kelly 3/65 (17 overs)		6/214 (72 overs); Marcus Stoinis 85 (130); Scott Boland 2/48 (15 overs)

Match drawn
Melbourne Cricket Ground, Melbourne
Umpires: Greg Davidson and Geoff Joshua
Player of the match: Nic Maddinson (Victoria)

- Victoria won the toss and elected to bat.

7-10 December 2018
Scorecard

South Australia	v	New South Wales (home team)
380 (113 overs); Alex Carey 110* (183); Greg West 3/88 (24 overs)		8/541d (165 overs); Daniel Hughes 134 (323); Jake Lehmann 2/17 (4 overs)
6/239 (95 overs); Jake Lehmann 67 (157); Steve O'Keefe 4/88 (34 overs)

Match drawn
Sydney Cricket Ground, Sydney
Umpires: Paul Wilson and Michael Graham-Smith
Player of the match: Daniel Hughes (New South Wales)

- South Australia won the toss and elected to bat.
- Greg West (New South Wales) made his first-class debut.

7-10 December 2018
Scorecard

(home team) Tasmania	v	Queensland
167 (55.4 overs); Matthew Wade 63 (106); Mark Steketee 3/35 (13 overs)		107 (36.4 overs); Michael Neser 27 (67); Alex Pyecroft 5/28 (11 overs)
353 (136.4 overs); George Bailey 109 (202); Mitchell Swepson 4/99 (28.4 overs)		6/414 (128.4 overs); Marnus Labuschagne 78 (150); Riley Meredith 3/70 (27 overs)

Queensland won by 4 wickets
Blundstone Arena, Hobart
Umpires: John Ward and Sam Nogajski
Player of the match: Michael Neser (Queensland)

- Queensland won the toss and elected to field.

=== Round 7 ===
23-26 February 2019
Scorecard

Western Australia	v	New South Wales (home team)
279 (127 overs); Cameron Bancroft 138* (358); Steve O'Keefe 4/78 (38 overs)		8/477d (150 overs); Kurtis Patterson 134 (229); Liam O'Connor 5/131 (38 overs)
147 (91.2 overs); Cameron Bancroft 86 (263); Steve O'Keefe 5/52 (33.2 overs)

New South Wales won by an innings and 51 runs
Bankstown Oval, Sydney
Umpires: Arno Jacobs and Gerard Abood
Player of the match: Steve O'Keefe (New South Wales)

- Western Australia won the toss and elected to bat.
- Bradley Hope and Liam O'Connor (Both Western Australia) made their first-class debuts.

23-26 February 2019
Scorecard

Queensland	v	Victoria (home team)
441 (134.4 overs); Charlie Hemphrey 93 (218); Chris Tremain 3/93 (30.4 overs)		344 (110.2 overs); Nic Maddinson 108 (169); Mark Steketee 3/61 (22 overs)
7/202d (51.4 overs); Joe Burns 80 (138); Jon Holland 5/72 (20.4 overs)		7/304 (73.2 overs); Marcus Harris 174 (197); Mitchell Swepson 4/107 (24.2 overs)

Victoria won by 3 wickets
Junction Oval, Melbourne
Umpires: Shaun Haig and Simon Fry
Player of the match: Marcus Harris (Victoria)

- Queensland won the toss and elected to bat.

23-26 February 2019
Scorecard

(home team) South Australia	v	Tasmania
257 (78.3 overs); Travis Head 50 (103); Jackson Bird 4/53 (18.3 overs)		467 (165.2 overs); Charlie Wakim 160 (333); Joe Mennie 3/53 (27.2 overs)
319 (90.5 overs); Jake Weatherald 150 (259); Jackson Bird 7/59 (24.5 overs)		4/110 (34.2 overs); Jordan Silk 36 (88); Travis Head 2/33 (10.2 overs)

Tasmania won by 6 wickets
Adelaide Oval, Adelaide
Umpires: Anil Dandekar and John Ward
Player of the match: Jackson Bird (Tasmania)

- South Australia won the toss and elected to bat.
- Charlie Wakim (Tasmania) made his first-class debut.

=== Round 8 ===
3-6 March 2019
Scorecard

New South Wales	v	Queensland (home team)
150 (54.2 overs); Nick Larkin 31 (72); Luke Feldman 5/20 (11 overs)		185 (85.3 overs); James Peirson 41 (95); Trent Copeland 3/49 (29.3 overs)
298 (99.1 overs); Moises Henriques 78 (116); Michael Neser 3/73 (27 overs)		89 (42 overs); Matt Renshaw 31 (51); Sean Abbott 5/31 (13 overs)

New South Wales won by 174 runs
The Gabba, Brisbane
Umpires: Anil Dandekar and Tony Wilds
Player of the match: Moises Henriques (New South Wales)

- Queensland won the toss and elected to field.

3-6 March 2019
Scorecard

South Australia	v	Western Australia (home team)
159 (62.3 overs); Conor McInerney 43 (144); Liam Guthrie 4/53 (15 overs)		157 (49.4 overs); Josh Philippe 47 (65); Nick Winter 4/23 (14 overs)
240 (67.4 overs); Travis Head 72 (118); Matthew Kelly 6/67 (18.4 overs)		4/243 (68 overs); Josh Philippe 53* (62); Joe Mennie 3/55 (20 overs)

Western Australia won by 6 wickets
WACA, Perth
Umpires: Gerard Abood and Sam Nogajski
Player of the match: Matthew Kelly (Western Australia)

- Western Australia won the toss and elected to field.
- Luke Robins (South Australia) made his first-class debut.

5-8 March 2019
Scorecard

(home team) Victoria	v	Tasmania
454 (115 overs); Nic Maddinson 136 (197); Riley Meredith 4/86 (27 overs)		286 (88.5 overs); Matthew Wade 86 (128); Scott Boland 4/63 (20 overs)
3/307d (66 overs); Will Pucovski 131* (160); Riley Meredith 1/30 (8 overs)		5/197 (100 overs); Alex Doolan 88 (204); Jon Holland 2/42 (39 overs)

Match drawn
Junction Oval, Melbourne
Umpires: Arno Jacobs and Geoff Joshua
Player of the match: Nic Maddinson (Victoria)

- Victoria won the toss and elected to bat.

=== Round 9 ===
11-14 March 2019
Scorecard

(home team) Queensland	v	South Australia
115 (64 overs); Marnus Labuschagne 36 (70); Tom Andrews 6/40 (24 overs)		71 (27.2 overs); Jake Lehmann 23 (41); Luke Feldman 4/19 (8.2 overs)
130 (59.2 overs); Sam Heazlett 37 (108); Joe Mennie 3/16 (11 overs)		131 (53.5 overs); Jake Lehmann 42 (84); Mark Steketee 4/29 (13 overs)

Queensland won by 43 runs
The Gabba, Brisbane
Umpires: Simon Lightbody and Michael Graham-Smith
Player of the match: Luke Feldman (Queensland)

- Queensland won the toss and elected to bat.
- Brad Davis (South Australia) made his first-class debut.

12-15 March 2019
Scorecard

Victoria	v	New South Wales (home team)
106 (55.3 overs); Nic Maddinson 24 (65); Harry Conway 5/14 (13 overs)		135 (50.5 overs); Daniel Hughes 45 (70); Jon Holland 5/31 (16 overs)
194 (70.2 overs); Matthew Short 50 (111); Harry Conway 4/50 (20 overs)		102 (38.5 overs); Peter Nevill 26* (72); James Pattinson 5/25 (12 overs)

Victoria won by 63 runs
Drummoyne Oval, Sydney
Umpires: John Ward and Simon Fry
Player of the match: Harry Conway (New South Wales)

- Victoria won the toss and elected to bat.
- As a result of this victory, Victoria qualified for a home final.

12-15 March 2019
Scorecard

Western Australia	v	Tasmania (home team)
367 (108.2 overs); Josh Philippe 76 (115); Jackson Bird 5/70 (30.2 overs)		197 (72.3 overs); Alex Doolan 46 (94); Mitchell Marsh 3/21 (12 overs)
8/283d (80 overs); Sam Whiteman 93 (192); Gabe Bell 3/72 (21 overs)		402 (107.1 overs); Matthew Wade 134 (201); Joel Paris 3/64 (24 overs)

Western Australia won by 51 runs
Blundstone Arena, Hobart
Umpires: Phillip Gillespie and Geoff Joshua

- Tasmania won the toss and elected to field.

=== Round 10 ===
20-23 March 2019
Scorecard

New South Wales	v	Tasmania (home team)
375 (110 overs); Nick Larkin 67 (153); Jackson Bird 3/85 (30 overs)		255 (97.4 overs); Alex Doolan 72 (166); Trent Copeland 6/88 (33.4 overs)
5/149d (49 overs); Moises Henriques 49 (69); Gabe Bell 2/22 (14 overs)		120 (35.4 overs); Matthew Wade 65 (76); Sean Abbott 7/45 (12.4 overs)

New South Wales won by 149 runs
Blundstone Arena, Hobart
Umpires: Paul Wilson and Sam Nogajski
Player of the match: Sean Abbott (New South Wales)

- Tasmania won the toss and elected to field.
- Nicholas Bertus and Baxter Holt (New South Wales) both made their first-class debuts.

20-23 March 2019
Scorecard

(home team) South Australia	v	Victoria
260 (85.5 overs); Travis Head 67 (117); Chris Tremain 3/38 (12.5 overs)		286 (106.3 overs); Will Pucovski 82 (190); Chadd Sayers 3/50 (26 overs)
192 (69.4 overs); Brad Davis 52 (137); Chris Tremain 4/34 (12 overs)		3/167 (48.2 overs); Marcus Harris 65 (98); Tom Andrews 2/42 (13.2 overs)

Victoria won by 7 wickets
Karen Rolton Oval, Adelaide
Umpires: Gerard Abood and Shawn Craig
Player of the match: Chris Tremain (Victoria)

- South Australia won the toss and elected to bat.

20-23 March 2019
Scorecard

(home team) Western Australia	v	Queensland
138 (57.1 overs); Sam Whiteman 38 (107); Michael Neser 5/15 (15 overs)		175 (56.4 overs); Sam Heazlett 68 (147); Aaron Hardie 4/29 (11.4 overs)
348 (107.1 overs); Mitchell Marsh 105 (161); Mark Steketee 4/65 (24 overs)		175 (54.4 overs); Matt Renshaw 73 (119); Aaron Hardie 4/33 (13 overs)

Western Australia won by 136 runs
WACA, Perth
Umpires: Greg Davidson and Phillip Gillespie
Player of the match: Aaron Hardie (Western Australia)

- Queensland won the toss and elected to field.
- Aaron Hardie (Western Australia) made his first-class debut.

== Final ==
28 March–1 April 2019
Scorecard

(home team) Victoria	v	New South Wales
289 (100.5 overs); Marcus Harris 141 (229); Trent Copeland 5/74 (34 overs)		121 (39 overs); Moises Henriques 35 (80); Peter Siddle 5/28 (14 overs)
219 (89.2 overs); Will Pucovski 51 (99); Sean Abbott 4/82 (23 overs)		210 (63.3 overs); Kurtis Patterson 76 (121); James Pattinson 4/41 (16 overs)

Victoria won by 177 runs
Junction Oval, Melbourne
Umpires: Paul Wilson and Sam Nogajski
Player of the match: Marcus Harris (Victoria)

- Victoria won the toss and elected to bat.
- Bonus Points: Victoria 1.88, New South Wales 0.90
- This was Victoria's 32nd Sheffield Shield win

== Statistics ==
=== Most runs ===
Player	Team	Mat	Inns	NO	Runs	Ave	HS	100	50
Marcus Harris	Victoria	10	18	1	1188	69.88	250*	3	6
Matthew Wade	Tasmania	10	20	3	1021	60.05	137	2	8
Alex Doolan	Tasmania	10	20	0	761	38.05	115	1	6
Daniel Hughes	New South Wales	11	20	1	742	39.05	134	2	4
Kurtis Patterson	New South Wales	11	20	2	724	40.22	134	2	4

=== Most wickets ===
Player	Team	Mat	Inns	Overs	Wkts	Ave	SR	BBI	BBM	5	10
Trent Copeland	New South Wales	9	17	408.2	52	18.21	47.1	6/86	9/131	3	0
Jackson Bird	Tasmania	10	20	398.4	50	22.22	47.8	7/59	11/112	4	2
Scott Boland	Victoria	10	20	332.1	48	19.66	41.5	7/54	9/102	2	0
Chris Tremain	Victoria	10	20	326.0	45	22.42	43.4	5/13	9/137	3	0
Mark Steketee	Queensland	9	17	288.2	42	20.76	41.1	4/29	8/101	0	0

== Broadcasting ==
All Sheffield Shield regular season matches were exclusively streamed live and free on Cricket Australia's official website, with the final broadcast live on Fox Sports' new Fox Cricket channel.
