= 2015–16 Sheffield Shield season =

Australian cricket tournament

2015–16 Sheffield Shield
- Dates: 28 October 2015 – 30 March 2016
- Administrator: Cricket Australia
- Cricket format: First-class
- Tournament format(s): Double round-robin and final
- Champions: Victoria (30th title)
- Participants: 6
- Matches: 31
- Player of the series: (South Australia) Travis Head
- Most runs: Ben Dunk (Tasmania) (838)
- Most wickets: Joe Mennie (South Australia) (51)

The 2015–16 Sheffield Shield season was the 114th season of the Sheffield Shield, the Australian domestic first-class cricket competition. The season began after the conclusion of the Matador BBQs One-Day Cup, and included a break halfway through to allow for the Big Bash League. Trials for day/night Tests with a pink ball continued, having been introduced during the previous season. All of the matches for rounds one and seven of the tournament were played as day/night games. Victoria won their second consecutive title, defeating South Australia by 7 wickets in the final at Gliderol Stadium. Travis Head was named player of the series for his 721 runs and 9 wickets during the season. Ben Dunk of Tasmania was the leading run-scorer, while Joe Mennie from South Australia took the most wickets.

== Points table ==
Team	Pld	W	L	D	NR	BP	Pts
South Australia	10	5	5	0	0	19.63	49.63
Victoria	10	5	3	2	0	17.13	49.13
New South Wales	10	5	2	3	0	14.57	47.57
Queensland	10	5	5	0	0	16.66	46.66
Western Australia	10	4	3	3	0	17.00	44.00
Tasmania	10	2	8	0	0	17.19	27.19

== Round-Robin stage ==
Visitor team →	NSW	QLD	SA	TAS	VIC	WA
Home team ↓	NSW	QLD	SA	TAS	VIC	WA
New South Wales		NSW; 7 wickets	NSW; 5 wickets	Tasmania; 223 runs	Victoria; Forfeited	Match drawn
Queensland	NSW; 3 wickets		Queensland; Inns & 14 runs	Queensland; 7 wickets	Queensland; 100 runs	WA; Inns & 6 runs
South Australia	NSW; 215 runs	Queensland; 173 runs		SA; Inns & 78 runs	Victoria; 218 runs	SA; 1 wicket
Tasmania	NSW; 7 wickets	Queensland; 3 wickets	SA; 302 runs		Tasmania; Inns & 136 runs	WA; 162 runs
Victoria	Match drawn	Victoria; 9 wickets	SA; 8 wickets	Victoria; 7 wickets		Match drawn
Western Australia	Match drawn	WA; 24 runs	SA; 1 wicket	WA; 9 wickets	Victoria; 356 runs	

Home team won	Visitor team won

- Note: Results listed are according to the home (horizontal) and visitor (vertical) teams.
- Note: Click on a result to see a summary of the match.

=== Round 1 ===
28 – 31 October (D/N)
Scorecard

New South Wales	v	South Australia (H)
9/262d (87.1 overs); Steve Smith 67 (121); Travis Head 3/42 (16 overs)		120 (39.3 overs); Travis Head 37 (61); Mitchell Starc 5/28 (11.3 overs)
1/291d (67 overs); Steve Smith 152* (192); Joe Mennie 1/64 (18 overs)		218 (74.4 overs); Callum Ferguson 96 (211); Josh Hazlewood 3/23 (15 overs)

New South Wales won by 215 runs
Adelaide Oval, Adelaide
Umpires: Greg Davidson and Mick Martell
Player of the match: Steve Smith (NSW)

- New South Wales won the toss and elected to bat.
- Bonus Points: South Australia 1.50, New South Wales 2.10

28 – 31 October (D/N)
Scorecard

Queensland	v	Victoria (H)
444 (138.3 overs); Scott Henry 141 (249); John Hastings 4/59 (34 overs)		3/319d (93 overs); Travis Dean 154* (279); Ben Cutting 2/62 (19 overs)
103 (32.3 overs); Marnus Labuschagne 27 (65); Peter Siddle 3/21 (8 overs)		1/230 (71.2 overs); Travis Dean 109* (221); Ben Cutting 1/26 (10 overs)

Victoria won by 9 wickets
Melbourne Cricket Ground, Melbourne
Umpires: Phillip Gillespie and Geoff Joshua
Player of the match: Travis Dean (Vic)

- Queensland won the toss and elected to bat.
- Travis Dean (Victoria) made his first-class debut.
- Travis Dean became the first player in Shield history to score two centuries on debut, and the first player in first-class cricket to score two unbeaten centuries on debut.
- Bonus Points: Victoria 1.70, Queensland 1.10

28 – 31 October (D/N)
Scorecard

Western Australia	v	Tasmania (H)
8/432d (144.1 overs); Michael Klinger 202* (401); Jackson Bird 3/83 (31 overs)		189 (89.4 overs); George Bailey 63 (202); Simon Mackin 3/30 (15.4 overs)
4/136d (32 overs); Michael Klinger 50* (58); Andrew Fekete 2/21 (9 overs)		217 (94.4 overs); George Bailey 68 (169); Mitchell Marsh 3/30 (18 overs)

Western Australia won by 162 runs
Bellerive Oval, Hobart
Umpires: Gerard Abood and Shawn Craig
Player of the match: Michael Klinger (WA)

- Tasmania won the toss and elected to field.
- Jake Doran (Tasmania) made his first-class debut.
- Bonus Points: Tasmania 0.50, Western Australia 2.20

=== Round 2 ===
6 – 9 November
Scorecard

(H) New South Wales	v	Victoria
1/88 (34.2 overs); Ed Cowan 48* (96); Peter Siddle 1/23 (11 overs)

Match awarded to Victoria; abandoned due to unsafe playing conditions
Sydney Cricket Ground, Sydney
Umpires: Simon Fry and Michael Graham-Smith

- New South Wales won the toss and elected to bat.
- Play was reduced to just 10 overs on Day 1 and just 24 overs on Day 2 due to rain and a wet outfield.
- The match was abandoned on Day 3 due to unsafe playing conditions. Under Law 7.2 in the Cricket Playing Conditions, Cricket Australia ruled that New South Wales had forfeited the match, and Victoria was awarded the 6 points for a win.
- Jay Lenton (New South Wales) made his first-class debut.

6 – 9 November
Scorecard

Western Australia	v	South Australia (H)
211 (84.5 overs); Sam Whiteman 45 (84); Joe Mennie 4/50 (19.5 overs)		191 (82.2 overs); Callum Ferguson 40 (124); Jason Behrendorff 4/55 (21.2 overs)
295 (108.4 overs); Cameron Bancroft 111 (258); Kane Richardson 3/54 (23.4 overs)		9/317 (86.5 overs); Travis Head 114 (150); Michael Hogan 3/58 (19.5 overs)

South Australia won by 1 wicket
Adelaide Oval, Adelaide
Umpires: Sam Nogajski and John Ward
Player of the match: Travis Head (SA)

- Western Australia won the toss and elected to bat.
- Bonus Points: South Australia 1.50, Western Australia 1.60

6 – 9 November
Scorecard

(H) Tasmania	v	Queensland
8/433d (133.3 overs); George Bailey 148* (190); Peter George 3/82 (31.3 overs)		8/329d (122 overs); Sam Heazlett 129 (248); James Faulkner 3/61 (23 overs)
168 (44 overs); Jake Doran 68 (113); Mark Steketee 4/52 (16 overs)		7/274 (65.3 overs); Sam Heazlett 78 (87); Jackson Bird 2/54 (19 overs)

Queensland won by 3 wickets
Bellerive Oval, Hobart
Umpires: Phillip Gillespie and Mick Martell
Player of the match: Sam Heazlett (Qld)

- Tasmania won the toss and elected to bat.
- Sam Heazlett (Queensland) made his first-class debut.
- Sam Heazlett scored his maiden first-class century.
- Bonus Points: Tasmania 1.50, Queensland 0.40

=== Round 3 ===
14 – 17 November
Scorecard

South Australia	v	Queensland (H)
203 (59.5 overs); Alex Ross 92* (136); James Hopes 4/52 (17 overs)		452 (145.4 overs); Marnus Labuschagne 112 (184); Joe Mennie 3/66 (33 overs)
235 (84.2 overs); Mark Cosgrove 65 (112); James Hopes 4/33 (21.2 overs)

Queensland won by an innings and 14 runs
Brisbane Cricket Ground, Woolloongabba, Brisbane
Umpires: John Ward and Ashley Barrow
Player of the match: James Hopes (Qld)

- Queensland won the toss and elected to field.
- Billy Stanlake (Queensland) made his first-class debut.
- The start of play on Day 1 was delayed by 90 minutes due to rain and ended early due to bad light.
- Bonus Points: Queensland 2.50, South Australia 0.50

14 – 17 November
Scorecard

(H) Victoria	v	Western Australia
7/423d (110 overs); Glenn Maxwell 98 (111); David Moody 4/106 (24 overs)		272 (107.3 overs); Michael Klinger 70 (140); Fawad Ahmed 5/105 (32 overs)
7/238d (56 overs); Rob Quiney 79 (106); Andrew Tye 3/58 (14 overs)		8/282 (106 overs); Will Bosisto 108 (288); James Pattinson 3/39 (19 overs)

Match drawn
Melbourne Cricket Ground, Melbourne
Umpires: Simon Fry and Paul Wilson
Player of the match: Will Bosisto (WA)

- Victoria won the toss and elected to bat.
- Aaron Ayre (Victoria) made his first-class debut.
- Bonus Points: Victoria 2.70, Western Australia 0.49

14 – 17 November
Scorecard

Tasmania	v	New South Wales (H)
295 (92.4 overs); Ben Dunk 68 (110); Stephen O'Keefe 4/46 (20.4 overs)		215 (77.2 overs); Kurtis Patterson 86 (179); Sam Rainbird 3/38 (17 overs)
7/313d (92 overs); Ben Dunk 144* (249); Doug Bollinger 3/67 (20 overs)		170 (62.4 overs); Ryan Carters 77 (166); Hamish Kingston 4/61 (16 overs)

Tasmania won by 223 runs
Bankstown Oval, Sydney
Umpires: Sam Nogajski and Geoff Joshua
Player of the match: Ben Dunk (Tas)

- Tasmania won the toss and elected to bat.
- With the previous Sheffield Shield match at the Sydney Cricket Ground being abandoned because of an unsafe pitch, the fixture was moved to the Bankstown Oval.
- The start of play on Day 1 was delayed by 75 minutes and ended after just 36 overs due to rain.
- Bonus Points: New South Wales 1.68, Tasmania 2.40

=== Round 4 ===
27 – 30 November
Scorecard

Victoria	v	Western Australia (H)
322 (82.4 overs); Peter Handscomb 98 (158); Joel Paris 4/68 (17.4 overs)		186 (68 overs); Will Bosisto 33 (88); Chris Tremain 4/48 (16 overs)
7/322d (78.5 overs); Marcus Stoinis 110 (161); Joel Paris 2/52 (17 overs)		102 (28.2 overs); Cameron Bancroft 16 (39); Scott Boland 7/31 (11.2 overs)

Victoria won by 356 runs
Western Australia Cricket Association Ground, Perth
Umpires: Shawn Craig and Michael Graham-Smith
Player of the match: Scott Boland (Vic)

- Western Australia won the toss and elected to field.
- Joel Paris (Western Australia) made his first-class debut.
- Bonus Points: Western Australia 1.50, Victoria 2.80

27 – 30 November
Scorecard

South Australia	v	Tasmania (H)
7/600d (124 overs); Callum Ferguson 213 (295); Andrew Fekete 4/151 (28 overs)		284 (89.1 overs); Ben Dunk 115 (176); Nick Benton 3/45 (16 overs)
185 (38 overs); Alex Ross 56 (55); Jackson Bird 5/69 (14 overs)		199 (88 overs); Jake Doran 50 (131); Chadd Sayers 4/41 (23 overs)

South Australia won by 302 runs
Bellerive Oval, Hobart
Umpires: Greg Davidson and Paul Wilson
Player of the match: Callum Ferguson (SA)

- Tasmania won the toss and elected to field.
- Bonus Points: Tasmania 0.90, South Australia 4.00

27 – 30 November
Scorecard

Queensland	v	New South Wales (H)
259 (111.3 overs); Jason Floros 82 (198); Stephen O'Keefe 3/56 (30.3 overs)		303 (88.5 overs); Nic Maddinson 112 (151); James Hopes 4/47 (23 overs)
145 (64.1 overs); Nathan Reardon 44 (97); Stephen O'Keefe 4/38 (22 overs)		3/102 (28.4 overs); Kurtis Patterson 31* (81); Jason Floros 1/19 (6 overs)

New South Wales won by 7 wickets
Sydney Cricket Ground, Sydney
Umpires: Gerard Abood and Ashley Barrow
Player of the match: Stephen O'Keefe (NSW)

- Queensland won the toss and elected to bat.
- Bonus Points: New South Wales 2.03, Queensland 1.82

=== Round 5 ===
6 – 9 December
Scorecard

(H) Victoria	v	South Australia
180 (46 overs); Glenn Maxwell 62 (55); Daniel Worrall 5/69 (17 overs)		199 (58 overs); Mark Cosgrove 50 (67); Chris Tremain 5/52 (17 overs)
163 (62 overs); Travis Dean 33 (82); Joe Mennie 4/55 (20 overs)		2/145 (26.3 overs); Tom Cooper 54 (64); John Hastings 1/31 (6 overs)

South Australia won by 8 wickets
Melbourne Cricket Ground, Melbourne
Umpires: Gerard Abood and Geoff Joshua
Player of the match: Joe Mennie (SA)

- South Australia won the toss and elected to field.
- Rain delayed play by 90 minutes after tea and ended play early on Day 2.
- Bonus Points: Victoria 1.50, South Australia 1.50

6 – 9 December
Scorecard

Tasmania	v	Western Australia (H)
261 (89.5 overs); Tom Triffitt 66 (131); Michael Hogan 4/48 (23.5 overs)		415 (133.2 overs); Ashton Agar 106 (128); Andrew Fekete 5/77 (25.2 overs)
205 (68.3 overs); Ben Dunk 75 (123); Joel Paris 6/23 (14.3 overs)		1/52 (14.2 overs); Cameron Bancroft 32* (41); Jackson Bird 1/8 (6 overs)

Western Australia won by 9 wickets
Western Australia Cricket Association Ground, Perth
Umpires: Simon Fry and Damien Mealey
Player of the match: Joel Paris (WA)

- Western Australia won the toss and elected to field.
- Rain reduced Day 1 to just 76 overs of play.
- Bonus Points: Western Australia 2.30, Tasmania 1.60

6 – 9 December
Scorecard

(H) Queensland	v	New South Wales
342 (136.4 overs); Matt Renshaw 170 (395); William Somerville 5/110 (38 overs)		260 (125.2 overs); Ben Rohrer 56 (130); Luke Feldman 4/45 (19.2 overs)
7/131d (51.3 overs); Scott Henry 38 (130); William Somerville 2/24 (12.3 overs)		7/217 (58.4 overs); Nic Maddinson 80 (72); Jason Floros 4/71 (25 overs)

New South Wales won by 3 wickets
Harrup Park, Mackay
Umpires: Shawn Craig and Tony Wilds
Player of the match: Matt Renshaw (Qld)

- Queensland won the toss and elected to bat.
- Bonus Points: Queensland 0.68, New South Wales -0.03

=== Round 6 ===
3 – 6 February
Scorecard

Tasmania	v	Victoria (H)
241 (68.3 overs); Beau Webster 107 (161); Chris Tremain 3/48 (16 overs)		271 (82.1 overs); Daniel Christian 95 (136); Sam Rainbird 4/66 (21 overs)
228 (82.4 overs); Ben McDermott 79* (150); Chris Tremain 4/37 (16.4 overs)		3/200 (41.4 overs); Rob Quiney 85* (133); Beau Webster 1/18 (5 overs)

Victoria won by 7 wickets
Melbourne Cricket Ground, Melbourne
Umpires: Gerard Abood and Greg Davidson
Player of the match: Daniel Christian (Vic)

- Victoria won the toss and elected to field.
- Rain reduced Day 1 to just 71 overs of play.
- Sam Harper and Ian Holland (both Victoria) made their first-class debuts.
- Bonus Points: Victoria 2.21, Tasmania 1.91

3 – 6 February
Scorecard

(H) New South Wales	v	Western Australia
402 (125.3 overs); Kurtis Patterson 75 (155); David Moody 3/91 (20 overs)		491 (147.5 overs); Adam Voges 149 (307); Doug Bollinger 3/107 (26 overs)
5/155 (87 overs); Peter Nevill 69 (210); Joel Paris 4/37 (18 overs)

Match drawn
Bert Sutcliffe Oval, Lincoln, New Zealand
Umpires: Simon Fry and John Ward
Player of the match: Adam Voges (WA)

- Western Australia won the toss and elected to field.
- This was the first game in Australian domestic cricket history to be played outside of Australia.
- Bonus Points: New South Wales 1.57, Western Australia 1.57

3 – 6 February
Scorecard

Queensland	v	South Australia (H)
6/474d (118 overs); Matt Renshaw 146 (244); Tom Andrews 3/106 (20 overs)		315 (89.5 overs); Jake Lehmann 126 (121); Peter George 3/50 (17.5 overs)
8/258d (61 overs); Sam Heazlett 72 (88); Joe Mennie 2/22 (9 overs)		244 (74.2 overs); Joe Mennie 43 (86); Mitchell Swepson 3/110 (24.2 overs)

Queensland won by 173 runs
Adelaide Oval, Adelaide
Umpires: Ashley Barrow and Phillip Gillespie
Player of the match: Matt Renshaw (Qld)

- Queensland won the toss and elected to bat.
- Bonus Points: South Australia 1.65, Queensland 3.23

=== Round 7 ===
14 – 17 February (D/N)
Scorecard

New South Wales	v	Western Australia (H)
316 (108.3 overs); Daniel Hughes 124 (237); Joel Paris 4/61 (25.3 overs)		8/511d (136 overs); Cameron Bancroft 144 (340); Gurinder Sandhu 3/110 (24 overs)
5/303 (112 overs); Kurtis Patterson 129* (289); Hilton Cartwright 1/16 (5 overs)

Match drawn
Western Australia Cricket Association Ground, Perth
Umpires: Gerard Abood and Lubabalo Gcuma (SA)
Player of the match: Kurtis Patterson (NSW)

- New South Wales won the toss and elected to bat.
- Bonus Points: Western Australia 1.86, New South Wales 0.94

14 – 17 February (D/N)
Scorecard

Tasmania	v	Queensland (H)
300 (101.4 overs); Beau Webster 106 (191); Peter George 3/44 (22 overs)		374 (102.3 overs); James Hopes 94 (60); Beau Webster 3/49 (16.3 overs)
233 (100.4 overs); Tom Triffitt 57 (86); Jack Wildermuth 3/31 (21 overs)		3/158 (43.5 overs); Charlie Hemphrey 79* (98); Ben Dunk 1/10 (4 overs)

Queensland won by 7 wickets
Brisbane Cricket Ground, Woolloongabba, Brisbane
Umpires: Shawn Craig and Tim Parlane (NZ)
Player of the match: James Hopes (Qld)

- Tasmania won the toss and elected to bat.
- Chris Hartley (Queensland) broke the record for the most catches taken by a wicket-keeper in Sheffield Shield history (500).
- Bonus Points: Queensland 3.23, Tasmania 2.39

14 – 17 February (D/N)
Scorecard

Victoria	v	South Australia (H)
9/325d (80.2 overs); Glenn Maxwell 79 (78); Joe Mennie 3/73 (21 overs)		224 (71.3 overs); Sam Raphael 48 (71); Scott Boland 5/38 (18 overs)
5/306d (92 overs); Peter Handscomb 102 (151); Adam Zampa 2/54 (15 overs)		189 (57.2 overs); Travis Head 59 (88); Fawad Ahmed 5/24 (12.2 overs)

Victoria won by 218 runs
Adelaide Oval, Adelaide
Umpires: Nitin Menon (Ind) and John Ward
Player of the match: Scott Boland (Vic)

- Victoria won the toss and elected to bat.
- Cameron Valente (South Australia) made his first-class debut.
- Bonus Points: South Australia 1.74, Victoria 2.75

=== Round 8 ===
25 – 28 February
Scorecard

South Australia	v	New South Wales (H)
298 (79.2 overs); Jake Lehmann 122 (148); Nic Maddinson 2/10 (4 overs)		211 (88.4 overs); Ryan Carters 54 (161); Daniel Worrall 4/48 (24.4 overs)
177 (51.3 overs); Travis Head 44 (55); Trent Copeland 5/62 (17.3 overs)		5/267 (81 overs); Ben Rohrer 109* (179); Joe Mennie 2/56 (21 overs)

New South Wales won by 5 wickets
International Sports Stadium, Coffs Harbour
Umpires: Ashley Barrow and Michael Graham-Smith
Player of the match: Trent Copeland (NSW)

- New South Wales won the toss and elected to field.
- Arjun Nair (New South Wales) and Jake Weatherald (South Australia) both made their first-class debuts.
- Bonus Points: New South Wales 1.61, South Australia 2.48

25 – 28 February
Scorecard

(H) Western Australia	v	Queensland
6/436d (123.5 overs); Cameron Bancroft 171 (339); Mark Steketee 3/64 (22 overs)		8/446d (130.5 overs); Marnus Labuschagne 103 (267); Michael Hogan 3/59 (24 overs)
5/291d (57 overs); Shaun Marsh 109 (119); Jack Wildermuth 3/38 (10 overs)		257 (58.5 overs); Charlie Hemphrey 102 (144); Joel Paris 4/78 (17.5 overs)

Western Australia won by 24 runs
Western Australia Cricket Association Ground, Perth
Umpires: Nitin Menon (Ind) and Paul Wilson
Player of the match: Shaun Marsh (WA)

- Queensland won the toss and elected to field.
- Bonus Points: Western Australia 1.28, Queensland 1.18

25 – 28 February
Scorecard

Victoria	v	Tasmania (H)
165 (55.2 overs); Chris Tremain 28 (41); Beau Webster 3/18 (4.2 overs)		8/566d (144 overs); Ben Dunk 190 (281); Jake Reed 3/114 (25 overs)
265 (84.1 overs); Cameron White 106 (128); Evan Gulbis 4/45 (19 overs)

Tasmania won by an innings and 136 runs
Bellerive Oval, Hobart
Umpires: Lubabalo Gcuma (SA) and Sam Nogajski
Player of the match: Ben Dunk (Tas)

- Tasmania won the toss and elected to field.
- Bonus Points: Tasmania 3.09, Victoria 0.50

=== Round 9 ===
5 – 8 March
Scorecard

(H) Tasmania	v	New South Wales
242 (75.4 overs); Beau Webster 73 (143); Harry Conway 5/45 (13.4 overs)		271 (89.1 overs); Kurtis Patterson 100 (195); Jackson Bird 7/45 (20.1 overs)
177 (46.4 overs); Evan Gulbis 62 (49); Trent Copeland 7/58 (23 overs)		3/150 (23.4 overs); Daniel Hughes 100* (89); Jackson Bird 3/47 (9 overs)

New South Wales won by 7 wickets
Bellerive Oval, Hobart
Umpires: Shawn Craig and John Ward
Player of the match: Trent Copeland (NSW)

- New South Wales won the toss and elected to field.
- Harry Conway (New South Wales) made his first-class debut.
- Bonus Points: Tasmania 1.92, New South Wales 2.21

5 – 8 March
Scorecard

(H) Queensland	v	Victoria
190 (71.3 overs); Sam Heazlett 45 (71); Scott Boland 4/44 (19.3 overs)		147 (53.1 overs); Scott Boland 33 (45); Jack Wildermuth 4/27 (9.1 overs)
184 (59 overs); Chris Hartley 55* (88); Chris Tremain 4/40 (17 overs)		127 (56.3 overs); Rob Quiney 53 (107); James Hopes 4/43 (16 overs)

Queensland won by 100 runs
Brisbane Cricket Ground, Woolloongabba, Brisbane
Umpires: Sam Nogajski and Paul Wilson
Player of the match: Jack Wildermuth (Qld)

- Victoria won the toss and elected to field.
- Bad light ended play early on Day 1.
- Bonus Points: Queensland 1.50, Victoria 1.50

5 – 8 March
Scorecard

(H) Western Australia	v	South Australia
311 (106.2 overs); Hilton Cartwright 139 (222); Daniel Worrall 5/91 (30 overs)		230 (56.5 overs); Sam Raphael 80 (131); Michael Hogan 4/49 (14 overs)
192 (67.1 overs); Adam Voges 89 (193); Joe Mennie 3/47 (18 overs)		9/275 (60 overs); Travis Head 134 (141); Joel Paris 5/87 (20 overs)

South Australia won by 1 wicket
Western Australia Cricket Association Ground, Perth
Umpires: Geoff Joshua and Mick Martell
Player of the match: Joe Mennie (SA)

- South Australia won the toss and elected to field.
- Josh Nicholas (Western Australia) made his first-class debut.
- Bonus Points: Western Australia 2.35, South Australia 1.80

=== Round 10 ===
15 – 18 March
Scorecard

(H) Queensland	v	Western Australia
147 (61.1 overs); Mark Steketee 32* (45); Michael Hogan 4/29 (16.1 overs)		380 (137 overs); Hilton Cartwright 92 (176); James Hopes 3/60 (29 overs)
227 (52.4 overs); Chris Lynn 80 (46); Michael Hogan 4/58 (18 overs)

Western Australia won by an innings and 6 runs
Brisbane Cricket Ground, Woolloongabba, Brisbane
Umpires: Geoff Joshua and John Ward
Player of the match: Hilton Cartwright (WA)

- Western Australia won the toss and elected to field.
- Jhye Richardson (Western Australia) made his first-class debut.
- Bonus Points: Queensland 1.00, Western Australia 1.82

15 – 18 March
Scorecard

Tasmania	v	South Australia (H)
91 (37.4 overs); Tom Triffitt 25 (49); Chadd Sayers 7/46 (15 overs)		346 (74.2 overs); Travis Head 192 (176); Jackson Bird 5/81 (22 overs)
177 (62.1 overs); Alex Doolan 67 (134); Daniel Worrall 4/71 (16.1 overs)

South Australia won by an innings and 78 runs
Gliderol Stadium, Adelaide
Umpires: Gerard Abood and Sam Nogajski
Player of the match: Chadd Sayers (SA)

- Tasmania won the toss and elected to bat.
- Elliot Opie (South Australia) and Caleb Jewell (Tasmania) both made their first-class debuts.
- Bonus Points: South Australia 2.96, Tasmania 1.50

15 – 18 March
Scorecard

New South Wales	v	Victoria (H)
341 (107.1 overs); Kurtis Patterson 82 (174); Chris Tremain 4/47 (17 overs)		251 (90 overs); Marcus Stoinis 107 (199); Sean Abbott 3/60 (18 overs)
178 (63.4 overs); Trent Copeland 47 (84); Daniel Christian 5/40 (16.4 overs)		7/234 (110.4 overs); Cameron White 97* (253); Trent Copeland 3/59 (31 overs)

Match drawn
Traeger Park, Alice Springs
Umpires: Mick Martell and Paul Wilson
Player of the match: Cameron White (Vic)

- New South Wales won the toss and elected to bat.
- Bonus Points: Victoria 1.51, New South Wales 2.44

== Final ==
26 – 30 March
Scorecard

(H) South Australia	v	Victoria
340 (93.3 overs); Alex Ross 72 (108); Chris Tremain 3/73 (15.3 overs)		399 (121.2 overs); Peter Handscomb 112 (201); Daniel Worrall 6/96 (34.2 overs)
251 (102.5 overs); Jake Weatherald 96 (223); Jon Holland 5/76 (37 overs)		3/196 (51 overs); Marcus Stoinis 72 (129); Elliot Opie 1/15 (9 overs)

Victoria won by 7 wickets
Gliderol Stadium, Adelaide
Umpires: Mick Martell and Paul Wilson
Player of the match: Peter Handscomb (Vic)

- South Australia won the toss and elected to bat.
- Victoria became the first visiting team to win a Sheffield Shield final since New South Wales in 2004-05.

== Statistics ==
=== Most runs ===
Player	Team	Mat	Inns	NO	Runs	Ave	HS	100	50
Ben Dunk	Tasmania	10	19	1	837	46.55	190	4	2
Travis Dean	Victoria	11	20	2	807	44.83	154*	3	4
Peter Handscomb	Victoria	11	19	1	784	43.55	137	3	4
George Bailey	Tasmania	9	17	1	761	47.56	148*	3	3
Matt Renshaw	Queensland	9	17	3	738	52.71	129*	2	4

=== Most wickets ===
Player	Team	Mat	Inns	Overs	Wkts	Ave	BBI	SR
Joe Mennie	South Australia	11	21	429.5	51	21.21	4/50	50.50
Daniel Worrall	South Australia	9	18	357.5	44	26.18	6/96	48.70
Jackson Bird	Tasmania	8	15	276.2	40	19.50	7/45	41.40
Michael Hogan	Western Australia	9	18	342.5	37	24.64	4/29	55.50
Chris Tremain	Victoria	9	15	228.1	36	21.05	5/52	38.00
