= Irish cricket team in South Africa in 2016–17 =

International cricket tour

The Irish national cricket team toured South Africa in September 2016. They played two One day internationals, one each against South Africa and Australia. They lost heavily in both matches, by 206 runs against South Africa and by nine wickets against Australia. Their match against South Africa was the first ODI to use the updated rules to the DRS system, which brought more of the stumps into play for LBW decisions.

== Squads ==
Ireland	Australia	South Africa
William Porterfield (c); John Anderson; Peter Chase; George Dockrell; Ed Joyce; Tim Murtagh; Andrew McBrine; Barry McCarthy; Kevin O'Brien; Niall O'Brien; Stuart Poynter; Paul Stirling; Gary Wilson; Craig Young	Steve Smith (c); David Warner; George Bailey; Scott Boland; Aaron Finch; John Hastings; Travis Head; Usman Khawaja; Mitchell Marsh; Joe Mennie; Chris Tremain; Matthew Wade; Daniel Worrall; Adam Zampa	Faf du Plessis (c); ~~AB de Villiers (c)~~; Temba Bavuma; Farhaan Behardien; Quinton de Kock; JP Duminy; David Miller; ~~Chris Morris~~; Wayne Parnell; Aaron Phangiso; Andile Phehlukwayo; Dwaine Pretorius; Kagiso Rabada; Rilee Rossouw

AB de Villiers was originally named as the captain for the game against Ireland. However, he was still recovering from an injury, so Faf du Plessis took his place as captain and Rilee Rossouw was also added to the squad. Chris Morris suffered a knee injury ruling him out for two months. He was replaced by Dwaine Pretorius.

== South Africa vs Ireland ==
25 September 2016
Scorecard

South Africa; 354/5 (50 overs)	v	Ireland; 148 (30.5 overs)
Temba Bavuma 113 (123); Craig Young 3/81 (10 overs)		Kevin O'Brien 41 (36); JP Duminy 4/16 (4.5 overs)

South Africa won by 206 runs
Willowmoore Park, Benoni
Umpires: Shaun George (SA) and Joel Wilson (WI)
Player of the match: Temba Bavuma (SA)

- Ireland won the toss and elected to field.
- Temba Bavuma, Andile Phehlukwayo and Dwaine Pretorius (SA) all made their ODI debuts.
- Temba Bavuma (SA) made his maiden ODI century, becoming the twelfth player to do so on debut.

== Australia vs Ireland ==
27 September 2016
Scorecard

Ireland; 198 (43.5 overs)	v	Australia; 199/1 (30.1 overs)
John Anderson 39 (49); Adam Zampa 3/37 (10 overs)		Usman Khawaja 82* (77); Tim Murtagh 1/21 (6 overs)

Australia won by 9 wickets
Willowmoore Park, Benoni
Umpires: Bongani Jele (SA) and Nigel Llong (Eng)
Player of the match: Usman Khawaja (Aus)

- Ireland won the toss and elected to bat.
- Daniel Worrall (Aus) made his ODI debut.
- Bongani Jele (SA) stood in his first ODI match as an umpire.

== See also ==
- Australian cricket team in South Africa in 2016–17
