= Pakistani cricket team in Australia in 2016–17 =

International cricket tour

	Australia	Pakistan
- Dates: 8 December 2016 – 26 January 2017
Captains	Steve Smith	Misbah-ul-Haq (Tests); Azhar Ali (1st, 4th & 5th ODIs); Mohammad Hafeez (2nd & 3rd ODIs)

Test series
- Result: Australia won the 3-match series 3–0
Most runs	Steve Smith (441)	Azhar Ali (406)
Most wickets	Josh Hazlewood (15)	Wahab Riaz (11)
- Player of the series: Steve Smith (Aus)

One Day International series
- Results: Australia won the 5-match series 4–1
Most runs	David Warner (367)	Babar Azam (282)
Most wickets	Mitchell Starc (9)	Hasan Ali (12)
- Player of the series: David Warner (Aus)

The Pakistani cricket team toured Australia in December 2016 to play three Test matches and five One Day Internationals (ODIs). The 1st Test at The Gabba in Brisbane was a day/night match played with a pink ball. In preparation for the first Test, ten matches in Pakistan's 2016–17 Quaid-e-Azam Trophy and the first round of matches in Australia's 2016–17 Sheffield Shield season were played as day/night matches. Ahead of the Test matches, Pakistan also played a first-class match against Cricket Australia XI.

This was Pakistan's 17th tour of Australia, with their previous tour occurring in 2009–10. During that tour they lost both the Test and the ODI series in a clean sweep and also lost the only T20I match. The last time that these teams met was 2014–15 in the United Arab Emirates where Pakistan won the Test series 2–0 but Australia won the ODI series 3–0. The Australians come into this Test series after recently losing their previous two series – against Sri Lanka abroad and to South Africa at home. They enter the ODI series after a 4–1 series victory against Sri Lanka, a 9 wicket win over Ireland and a 5–0 series defeat away to South Africa – the first time that Australia had lost all five matches in a five-match ODI series. However, immediately prior to this series, Australia won back the Chappell–Hadlee Trophy, defeating New Zealand in a 3–0 whitewash.

Australia won the Test series 3–0. Their victory in the third Test was their 12th consecutive win against Pakistan in Tests in Australia. Australia won the ODI series 4–1.

== Squads ==
Tests		ODIs	
Australia	Pakistan	Australia	Pakistan
Steve Smith (c); David Warner (vc); Ashton Agar; Jackson Bird; Hilton Cartwright; Peter Handscomb; Josh Hazlewood; Usman Khawaja; Nathan Lyon; Nic Maddinson; Matt Renshaw; Steve O'Keefe; Chadd Sayers; Mitchell Starc; Matthew Wade (wk)	Misbah-ul-Haq (c); Azhar Ali (vc); Sarfraz Ahmed (wk); Rahat Ali; Mohammad Amir; Mohammad Asghar; Sami Aslam; Babar Azam; Imran Khan; Sharjeel Khan; Sohail Khan; Younis Khan; Mohammad Nawaz; Wahab Riaz; Mohammad Rizwan; Asad Shafiq; Yasir Shah	Steve Smith (c); David Warner (vc); Pat Cummins; James Faulkner; Peter Handscomb; Josh Hazlewood; Travis Head; Usman Khawaja; ~~Chris Lynn~~; ~~Mitchell Marsh~~; Glenn Maxwell; Billy Stanlake; Mitchell Starc; Marcus Stoinis; Matthew Wade (wk); Adam Zampa	Azhar Ali (c); ~~Sarfraz Ahmed (wk)~~; Umar Akmal; Hasan Ali; Rahat Ali; Mohammad Amir; Babar Azam; Mohammad Hafeez; ~~Mohammad Irfan~~; Junaid Khan; Sharjeel Khan; Shoaib Malik; Mohammad Nawaz; Wahab Riaz; Mohammad Rizwan (wk); Asad Shafiq; Imad Wasim

Mohammad Asghar was added to Pakistan's squad as back-up for Yasir Shah. After the first Test, Hilton Cartwright was added to Australia's squad. Ashton Agar and Steve O'Keefe were added to Australia's squad for third Test with Nic Maddinson and Chadd Sayers being dropped. Mohammad Hafeez was added to Pakistan's ODI squad after the conclusion of the Test series. Mohammad Irfan left Pakistan's ODI squad after the death of his mother and was replaced by Junaid Khan. Sarfraz Ahmed also left Pakistan's squad after his mother was admitted into hospital. Mitchell Marsh and Chris Lynn were withdrawn from Australia's ODI squad due to injury, with Marcus Stoinis and Peter Handscomb replacing them respectively. Billy Stanlake was not included in Australia's squad for 5th ODI as he went to New Zealand for preparation ahead of the Chappell-Hadlee series.

== Tour matches ==
=== First-class match: Cricket Australia XI vs Pakistanis ===
8–10 December 2016 (D/N)
Scorecard

Pakistanis	v	Cricket Australia XI
208 (84.5 overs); Younis Khan 54 (138); Cameron Valente 4/36 (18 overs)		114 (39.1 overs); Jake Winter 39 (68); Mohammad Amir 3/15 (10 overs)
6/216d (73 overs); Azhar Ali 82 (209); Ryan Lees 2/28 (13 overs)		109 (27.3 overs); Arjun Nair 42 (60); Mohammad Nawaz 3/31 (8 overs)

Pakistanis won by 201 runs
Cazaly's Stadium, Cairns
Umpires: Gerard Abood (Aus) and Shawn Craig (Aus)

- Pakistanis won the toss and elected to bat.
- Cameron Wheatley and Jake Winter (Cricket Australia XI) both made their first-class debuts.

=== 50-over match: Cricket Australia XI vs Pakistanis ===
10 January 2017
10.00
Scorecard

Pakistanis; 7/334 (50 overs)	v	Cricket Australia XI; 138 (36.2 overs)
Babar Azam 98 (113); Cameron Green 3/59 (10 overs)		Josh Inglis 70 (64); Hasan Ali 3/18 (6.2 overs)

Pakistanis won by 196 runs
Allan Border Field, Brisbane
Umpires: Donovan Koch (Aus) and Sam Nogajski (Aus)

- Cricket Australia XI won the toss and elected to field.
- Travis Dean, Cameron Green, Riley Meredith, Will Pucovski, Will Sutherland and Henry Thornton (Cricket Australia XI) all made their List A debuts.

== Test series ==
=== 1st Test ===
15–19 December 2016 (D/N)
Scorecard

Australia	v	Pakistan
429 (130.1 overs); Steve Smith 130 (222); Wahab Riaz 4/89 (26 overs)		142 (55 overs); Sarfraz Ahmed 59* (64); Josh Hazlewood 3/22 (14 overs)
5/202d (39 overs); Usman Khawaja 74 (109); Rahat Ali 2/40 (10 overs)		450 (145 overs); Asad Shafiq 137 (207); Mitchell Starc 4/119 (39 overs)

Australia won by 39 runs
The Gabba, Brisbane
Umpires: Ian Gould (Eng) and Richard Illingworth (Eng)
Player of the match: Asad Shafiq (Pak)

- Australia won the toss and elected to bat.
- Peter Handscomb (Aus) scored his first century in Tests.
- Pakistan's 450 is their highest ever fourth innings total, the highest fourth innings total set at the Gabba and the fourth highest set overall in Tests.
- Asad Shafiq's (Pak) 137 is the highest individual score in the fourth innings of a Test at the Gabba.
- Shafiq scored his ninth Test century batting at number six, the most by any player batting in that position.

=== 2nd Test ===
26–30 December 2016
Scorecard

Pakistan	v	Australia
9/443d (126.3 overs); Azhar Ali 205* (364); Josh Hazlewood 3/50 (32.3 overs)		8/624d (142 overs); Steve Smith 165* (246); Sohail Khan 3/131 (31 overs)
163 (53.2 overs); Sarfraz Ahmed 43 (62); Mitchell Starc 4/36 (15.2 overs)

Australia won by an innings and 18 runs
Melbourne Cricket Ground, Melbourne
Umpires: Ian Gould (Eng) and Sundaram Ravi (Ind)
Player of the match: Steve Smith (Aus)

- Pakistan won the toss and elected to bat.
- Tea was taken early on day 1, with no play in the final session due to rain. Lunch was taken early on day 2, with no play in the middle session due to rain. Further rain caused play to cease at 5:15 pm. Rain delayed the start of play on day 3 until 10:35 am. Tea was taken early on day 4, with no play in the final session due to rain.
- Azhar Ali (Pak) scored his 1,000th Test run in 2016.
- Azhar Ali's first innings score of 205 not out is highest Test score by a Pakistani player in Australia and the second highest Test score by a visiting player at the Melbourne Cricket Ground.
- The partnership of 118 runs between Ali and Sohail Khan (Pak) is the highest 8th wicket partnership against Australia.
- Australia's first innings total of 624 is the highest Test innings score at the Melbourne Cricket Ground.
- Josh Hazlewood (Aus) took his 100th Test wicket.
- Steve Smith (Aus) scored his 1,000th Test run in 2016.
- This was the first time Pakistan lost by an innings margin despite scoring 400+ runs in the first innings of the match.

=== 3rd Test ===
3–7 January 2017
Scorecard

Australia	v	Pakistan
8/538d (135 overs); Matt Renshaw 184 (293); Wahab Riaz 3/89 (28 overs)		315 (110.3 overs); Younis Khan 175* (334); Josh Hazlewood 4/55 (27.3 overs)
2/241d (32 overs); Usman Khawaja 79* (98); Wahab Riaz 1/28 (7 overs)		244 (80.2 overs); Sarfraz Ahmed 72* (70); Josh Hazlewood 3/29 (18.2 overs)

Australia won by 220 runs
Sydney Cricket Ground, Sydney
Umpires: Richard Illingworth (Eng) and Sundaram Ravi (Ind)
Player of the match: David Warner (Aus)

- Australia won the toss and elected to bat.
- Rain prevented play in the first sessions of days 3 and 4.
- Hilton Cartwright (Aus) and Sharjeel Khan (Pak) both made their Test debuts.
- Steve Smith (Aus) played his 50th Test.
- David Warner (Aus) became the fifth batsmen to score a century before lunch on the first day of a Test match and the first to do so in Australia.
- David Warner's century off 78 balls is the fastest Test century at the Sydney Cricket Ground and the second fastest against Pakistan.
- Sarfraz Ahmed (Pak) claimed his 100th Test dismissal as a wicket-keeper.
- Matt Renshaw (Aus) scored his first Test century.
- Younis Khan (Pak) became the first player to score a century in every nation that has hosted a Test match, including the United Arab Emirates.
- David Warner's half century off 23 balls in the second innings is the fastest Test fifty by an Australian and the second fastest overall.
- This was the fourth consecutive whitewash for Pakistan in Australia in Tests and their sixth consecutive defeat, making it their worst streak.
- Jackson Bird (Aus) equalled the record of four catches in a Test as a substitute fielder.

== ODI series ==
=== 1st ODI ===
13 January 2017
13:20 (D/N)
Scorecard

Australia; 9/268 (50 overs)	v	Pakistan; 176 (42.4 overs)
Matthew Wade 100* (100); Hasan Ali 3/65 (9 overs)		Babar Azam 33 (46); James Faulkner 4/32 (7 overs)

Australia won by 92 runs
The Gabba, Brisbane
Umpires: Mick Martell (Aus) and Chettithody Shamshuddin (Ind)
Player of the match: Matthew Wade (Aus)

- Australia won the toss and elected to bat.
- Chris Lynn and Billy Stanlake (Aus) both made their ODI debuts.
- Matthew Wade (Aus) scored his maiden ODI century.

=== 2nd ODI ===
15 January 2017
14:20 (D/N)
Scorecard

Australia; 220 (48.2 overs)	v	Pakistan; 4/221 (47.4 overs)
Steve Smith 60 (101); Mohammad Amir 3/47 (9.2 overs)		Mohammad Hafeez 72 (104); James Faulkner 2/35 (9 overs)

Pakistan won by 6 wickets
Melbourne Cricket Ground, Melbourne
Umpires: Chris Gaffaney (NZ) and Paul Wilson (Aus)
Player of the match: Mohammad Hafeez (Pak)

- Australia won the toss and elected to bat.
- Mohammad Hafeez (Pak) captained his first ODI match after Azhar Ali sustained a hamstring injury in the first ODI.
- This was Pakistan's first victory in any format against Australia in Australia since January 2005 and ended their longest losing streak in ODIs against any host nation.

=== 3rd ODI ===
19 January 2017
11:20 (D/N)
Scorecard

Pakistan; 7/263 (50 overs)	v	Australia; 3/265 (45 overs)
Babar Azam 84 (100); Josh Hazlewood 3/32 (10 overs)		Steve Smith 108* (104); Mohammad Amir 1/36 (10 overs)

Australia won by 7 wickets
WACA Ground, Perth
Umpires: Simon Fry (Aus) and Chettithody Shamshuddin (Ind)
Player of the match: Steve Smith (Aus)

- Australia won the toss and elected to field.
- Peter Handscomb (Aus) made his ODI debut.
- Billy Stanlake (Aus) took his maiden ODI wicket.
- Babar Azam (Pak) became the joint-fastest player to score 1,000 runs in ODIs and the fastest for Pakistan in his 21st innings, later broke by his team-mate in 2018, Fakhar Zaman, who achieved the feat in his 18th innings.
- Steve Smith (Aus) scored his 3,000th ODI run, becoming the quickest Australian to reach the milestone in his 79th innings.

=== 4th ODI ===
22 January 2017
14:20 (D/N)
Scorecard

Australia; 6/353 (50 overs)	v	Pakistan; 267 (43.5 overs)
David Warner 130 (119); Hasan Ali 5/54 (10 overs)		Sharjeel Khan 74 (47); Josh Hazlewood 3/54 (8.5 overs)

Australia won by 86 runs
Sydney Cricket Ground, Sydney
Umpires: Chris Gaffaney (NZ) and Mick Martell (Aus)
Player of the match: David Warner (Aus)

- Australia won the toss and elected to bat.

=== 5th ODI ===
26 January 2017
13:50 (D/N)
Scorecard

Australia; 7/369 (50 overs)	v	Pakistan; 312 (49.1 overs)
David Warner 179 (128); Junaid Khan 2/61 (10 overs)		Babar Azam 100 (109); Mitchell Starc 4/42 (9.1 overs)

Australia won by 57 runs
Adelaide Oval, Adelaide
Umpires: Simon Fry (Aus) and Chettithody Shamshuddin (Ind)
Player of the match: David Warner (Aus)

- Australia won the toss and elected to bat.
- Travis Head (Aus) scored his maiden ODI century.
- David Warner's (Aus) 179 was his highest ODI score and he equaled the record for the most 150s in ODIs (5).
- Travis Head and David Warner's opening wicket partnership of 284 runs was the second highest opening stand and Australia's highest for any wicket in ODIs.
- Their openers came out with an aggressive mindset, looking to capitalize on the powerplay. Usman Khan was the star of the opening overs, hammering boundaries all over the park. Australia Won by 13 Runs
- In 2016–17, the Pakistan cricket team toured Australia, playing three Test matches and five One-Day Internationals (ODIs). It was a challenging series for Pakistan in which Australia won the Test series 3-0 and the ODI series 4-1. Pakistan's players struggled on Australia's fast pitches, although there were some standout performances, such as Azhar Ali and Sharjeel Khan's brilliant batting.
