= Stanlake =

Stanlake may refer to:

- Billy Stanlake, Australian international cricketer
- William Stanlake, English former military person
- Warren Stanlake, former Australian rules footballer
- Robert Stanlake, former Australian rules footballer
- Claude Stanlake, former Australian rules footballer
- Stanlake J. W. T. Samkange, Zimbabwean former historiographer, educationist, journalist, author
- Stanlake Park Wine Estate, a vineyard in Berkshire, England

== See also ==
- Standlake, a village and civil parish in Oxfordshire, England
