= Brad Davis (cricketer) =

Australian cricketer (born 1990)

Personal information
- Full name: Bradley R Davis
- Born: 1990 (age 35–36)
- Batting: Right-handed
- Bowling: Right-arm medium
- Role: Wicket-keeper-batsman

Domestic team information
- Years: Team
- 2018/19–2020/21: South Australia

Career statistics
Competition	First-class
Matches	5
Runs scored	196
Batting average	19.60
100s/50s	0/2
Top score	57
Catches/stumpings	3/–
- Source: ESPNcricinfo, 4 October 2021

Brad Davis (born 1990) is an Australian cricketer who played five first-class cricket matches for South Australia. Davis is a prolific player in South Australian Premier Cricket, holding the run-scoring and games records for Sturt Cricket Club, but was unable to establish himself at first-class level, playing just five matches for South Australia, his last match being in 2020.

== Early life and junior career ==
Davis was born in 1990. His father and grandfather both played first-grade cricket in South Australia. His father, Garry Davis, played for Adelaide University and won the Bradman Medal as the best player in South Australian Premier Cricket in the 1982–83 season.

Davis started his junior cricket career playing for Sturt Cricket Club, living within walking distance of the club's home ground. He also represented South Australia at both under-17 and under-19 level.

== Cricket career ==
Davis made his first grade debut for Sturt in the 2007–08 season. He was a prolific run-scorer at the club for many years, becoming the club's captain in the 2016–17 season, but it took him until age 27 to make his first appearance for South Australia's second XI team. Davis made his first-class debut for South Australia in the 2018–19 Sheffield Shield season on 11 March 2019. He played a second match beginning on 20 March against Victoria, in which he scored his maiden first-class half-century with 52 runs in South Australia's second innings.

Davis earned a state contract with the team for the 2020–21 season following strong form in grade cricket and second XI match, and he entered the season in good form, scoring 149 runs not out in an internal trial match at Karen Rolton Oval before the first match of the season. Davis began the 2020–21 Sheffield Shield season batting at the number 3 position for South Australia, and in the first match of the season against Western Australia he scored his second half-century, with 57 runs in the first innings. This was Davis' highest score at first-class level. Davis lost his place in the squad in February 2021 in favour of the younger Liam Scott, and at the end of the season he was one of five players to be cut from their list, following a season without any wins.

Although he didn't experience success at first-class level, Davis was very successful in grade cricket for Sturt. In the 2020–21 season he won the Bradman Medal as the best player in first grade cricket, tying with Samuel Kerber from Adelaide University. In doing so, Davis and his father became the first father-son pair to have both won the Bradman Medal. He won a second Bradman Medal in the 2024–25 season. Davis also broke Sturt's club records for most runs scored (surpassing Jason Borgas in the 2024–25 season) and most games played (surpassing Vic Richardson in the 2025–26 season, a record that Richardson had held since 1942). At age 35, he announced that the 2025–26 season would be his last at the club, as his family planned to move to Albury–Wodonga the following year for work opportunities.
