= Ray Watson-Smith =

South African cricketer (1940–2024)

Personal information
- Full name: Raymond Watson-Smith
- Born: 20 February 1940; Mowbray, Cape Town, Cape Province, South Africa
- Died: 27 March 2024 (aged 84)
- Batting: Right-handed
- Bowling: Right-arm medium-pace

Domestic team information
- Years: Team
- 1969–70: Border

Career statistics
| Competition | FC | List A |
|---|---|---|
| Matches | 5 | 1 |
| Runs scored | 444 | 47 |
| Batting average | 88.80 | 47.00 |
| 100s/50s | 2/1 | 0/0 |
| Top score | 183* | 47 |
| Balls bowled | 12 | 0 |
| Wickets | 0 | – |
| Bowling average | – | – |
| 5 wickets in innings | – | – |
| 10 wickets in match | – | – |
| Best bowling | – | – |
| Catches/stumpings | 4/– | 3/– |
- Source: CricketArchive, 9 July 2016

Raymond Watson-Smith (20 February 1940 – 27 March 2024) was a South African cricketer. Playing for Border in 1969–70, he scored a not-out century in each of his first two first-class matches, and reached 310 runs before being dismissed.

== Cricket career ==
Ray Watson-Smith made his first-class debut for Border against Orange Free State in November 1969 in the B Section of the Currie Cup. In a drawn match in Bloemfontein, in which 1258 runs were scored in three days for the loss of only 17 wickets, Watson-Smith, batting at number seven, scored 183 not out, the highest of five centuries in the match. In the next match, against Griqualand West in East London two weeks later, he batted at number six and made 125 not out in 145 minutes. Border won by an innings. He was finally dismissed for the first time in the next match against Natal B, when he made 2 and 19, and Border lost by an innings. In the fourth and last match of the Currie Cup season he made 25 and 53 not out in a draw with North Eastern Transvaal.

He finished the Currie Cup season at the top of the competition's batting averages, with 407 runs at an average of 135.66. He then played for Border against the Australians, scoring 28 and 9. At the end of the season he played one match in South Africa's first List A cricket tournament, top-scoring with 47 in a losing Border team.

His captain at Border, Gordon Minkley, said Watson-Smith was a talented player but "He hit a lot of balls in the air and I think the word quickly got around among the other teams." Watson-Smith moved away from Border after the 1969–70 season and played no further first-class cricket.

Watson-Smith's 310 career runs before being dismissed remained a world record until 2015, when the Victorian batsman Travis Dean made 347 runs before being dismissed. Dean was dismissed in his second first-class match.
