= Alex Pyecroft =

Australian cricketer (born 1992)

Personal information
- Born: 4 September 1992 (age 34)
- Batting: Right-handed
- Bowling: Right-arm medium-fast
- Role: Bowler

Domestic team information
- Years: Team
- 2018-: Tasmanian Tigers (squad no. 4)

Career statistics
Competition	FC
Matches	8
Runs scored	99
Batting average	7.61
100s/50s	0/0
Top score	29
Balls bowled	1,464
Wickets	22
Bowling average	31.36
5 wickets in innings	1
10 wickets in match	0
Best bowling	5/28
Catches/stumpings	6/–
- Source: Cricinfo, 5 October 2021

Alex Pyecroft (born 4 September 1992) is an Australian cricketer. He made his first-class debut for Tasmania in the 2018–19 Sheffield Shield season on 27 November 2018. As well as being a player, Pyecroft is also the Female Pathway Coach of the Hobart Hurricanes in the Women's Big Bash League (WBBL).
