= Dean Sayers =

Australian cricketer (born 1954)

Personal information
- Full name: Dean Keith Sayers
- Born: 11 June 1954 (age 72); Adelaide, Australia
- Batting: Right-handed
- Bowling: Right-arm fast-medium
- Role: Bowler
- Relatives: Chadd Sayers (son)

Domestic team information
- Years: Team
- 1981/82–1982/83: South Australia

Career statistics
Competition	FC	LA
Matches	3	1
Runs scored	7	4
Batting average	3.50	–
100s/50s	0/0	0/0
Top score	5*	4*
Balls bowled	432	60
Wickets	3	1
Bowling average	57.33	38.00
5 wickets in innings	0	0
10 wickets in match	0	–
Best bowling	2/43	1/38
Catches/stumpings	0/–	0/–
- Source: ESPNcricinfo, 11 March 2024

Dean Keith Sayers (born 11 June 1954) is an Australian cricketer. He played in three first-class matches and one List A match for South Australia from 1981 to 1982. His son, Chadd Sayers also played cricket for South Australia.

== See also ==
- List of South Australian representative cricketers
