= Elliot Opie =

Australian cricketer (born 1991)

Personal information
- Born: 16 April 1991 (age 35); Melbourne, Victoria, Australia

Career statistics
| Competition | First-class |
|---|---|
| Matches | 2 |
| Runs scored | 19 |
| Batting average | 19.00 |
| 100s/50s | 0/0 |
| Top score | 15 |
| Balls bowled | 288 |
| Wickets | 4 |
| Bowling average | 38.75 |
| 5 wickets in innings | 0 |
| 10 wickets in match | 0 |
| Best bowling | 2/92 |
| Catches/stumpings | 0/– |
- Source: Cricinfo, 5 October 2021

Elliot Opie (born 16 April 1991) is an Australian cricketer. He made his first-class debut for South Australia on 15 March 2016 in the 2015–16 Sheffield Shield.
