= Nicholas Bertus =

Australian cricketer (born 1993)

Personal information
- Full name: Nicholas Lawrence Bertus
- Born: 24 July 1993 (age 33); Castle Hill, New South Wales
- Batting: Left-handed
- Role: Wicket-keeper-batsman

Domestic team information
- Years: Team
- 2018/19–2019/20: New South Wales
- 2021/22: Sydney Sixers

Career statistics
Competition	FC	LA	T20
Matches	4	5	2
Runs scored	130	87	19
Batting average	21.66	21.75	9.50
100s/50s	0/1	0/1	0/0
Top score	53	69*	15
Catches/stumpings	3/—	1/—	0/–
- Source: Cricinfo, 22 October 2022

Nicholas Lawrence Bertus (born 24 July 1993) is an Australian cricketer who represents New South Wales. He made his first-class debut for New South Wales in the 2018–19 Sheffield Shield season on 20 March 2019. He made his List A debut in the 2019–20 Marsh One-Day Cup, against Queensland, on 22 September 2019, scoring 69 not out. He made his Twenty20 debut on 22 January 2022, for the Sydney Sixers in the 2021–22 Big Bash League season.
