= Greg West (cricketer) =

Australian cricketer (born 1994)

Personal information
- Full name: Gregory Aaron West
- Born: 25 April 1994 (age 32); Belmont, New South Wales, Australia
- Batting: Right-handed
- Bowling: Left-arm fast-medium
- Role: Bowler

Domestic team information
- Years: Team
- 2015/16: Adelaide Strikers (squad no. 67)
- 2018—: New South Wales (squad no. 76)
- 2018—: Sydney Sixers (squad no. 76)

Career statistics
Competition	FC	T20
Matches	2	3
Runs scored	16	0
Batting average	8.00	—
100s/50s	0/0	0/0
Top score	12	0*
Balls bowled	338	42
Wickets	8	2
Bowling average	23.87	42.50
5 wickets in innings	0	0
10 wickets in match	0	0
Best bowling	3/30	2/24
Catches/stumpings	0/–	1/–
- Source: ESPNcricinfo, 4 October 2021

Greg West (born 25 April 1994) is an Australian professional cricketer who currently represents New South Wales and the Sydney Sixers. He made his Twenty20 (T20) debut for Adelaide Strikers in the 2015–16 Big Bash League season on 13 January 2016. He made his first-class debut for New South Wales in the 2018–19 Sheffield Shield season on 7 December 2018.
