= Jake Winter =

Australian cricketer

Personal information
- Full name: Jake Liam Winter
- Born: 2 June 1997 (age 29)
- Batting: Right-handed
- Bowling: Right-arm offbreak
- Role: Opening batsman

Domestic team information
- Years: Team
- 2017: South Australia
- Only First-class: 8 December 2016 Cricket Australia XI v Pakistanis

Career statistics
Competition	FC	LA
Matches	1	2
Runs scored	39	44
Batting average	19.50	22.00
100s/50s	0/0	0/0
Top score	39	24
Catches/stumpings	2/-	0/-
- Source: Cricinfo, 15 February 2024

Jake Winter (born 2 June 1997) is an Australian cricketer. He made his first-class debut for Cricket Australia XI during Pakistan's tour of Australia on 8 December 2016.

== Youth career ==
Winter started his career playing grade cricket for Glenelg, playing regularly at B-grade level by the 2013–14 season when he was sixteen years old. In January 2014 he represented South Australia in the national under-17 cricket championships and was named the player of the tournament, scoring a tournament-high 389 runs with a batting average of 77.80. In the 2014–15 season he made his A-grade debut for Glenelg, but he suffered a fractured hip and torn hip flexor during the game. He returned to cricket two months later through B-grade before he was called up to play for South Australia in the under-19 national championships in January 2015 as one of the state's two co-captains. He performed well in the tournament and went on to play for Australia's national youth team. He played three Youth One Day Internationals for Australia, all against Sri Lanka.

== Rise to domestic cricket ==
After scoring 276 runs at an average of 55.20 in the Redbacks League, Winter scored a century in the first round of the grade cricket season in 2016–17 and became the first person nominated to win the premier grade's rising star award, the Jason Gillespie Medal. He then made his debut for South Australia in the Futures League, scoring 144 runs against the ACT Comets, resulting in his inclusion in a South Australia XI against the touring South Africa national cricket team. Against an international standard attack he teamed up with Tim Ludeman for a 159-run fourth-wicket partnership, scoring 63 runs himself. He continued his strong start to the season with another grade cricket century

Winter was selected for another tour match, this time for a Cricket Australia XI against the touring Pakistan national cricket team. On a slow wicket he top-scored for the Cricket Australia XI, leading a game-high partnership of 57 runs with Matthew Short. At the end of the season his form was rewarded with both the Jason Gillespie Medal as South Australia's grade cricket Rising Star and a rookie contract with South Australia for the 2017–18 season.
