= Andile Phehlukwayo =

South African cricketer (born 1996)

Personal information
- Full name: Andile Lucky Phehlukwayo
- Born: 3 March 1996 (age 30); Durban, KwaZulu-Natal, South Africa
- Height: 180 cm (5 ft 11 in)
- Batting: Left-handed
- Bowling: Right-arm medium-fast
- Role: All-rounder
- Relatives: Okuhle Cele (cousin)

International information
- National side: South Africa (2016–present)
- Test debut (cap 333): 28 September 2017 v Bangladesh
- Last Test: 24 January 2018 v India
- ODI debut (cap 118): 25 September 2016 v Ireland
- Last ODI: 19 December 2024 v Pakistan
- T20I debut (cap 68): 20 January 2017 v Sri Lanka
- Last T20I: 25 May 2024 v West Indies

Domestic team information
- Years: Team
- 2013/14–2018/19: KwaZulu-Natal
- 2014/15–2020/21: Dolphins
- 2018: Cape Town Blitz
- 2019/20: Durban Heat
- 2021/22–2023/24: KwaZulu-Natal Coastal
- 2023–2025: Paarl Royals
- 2024/25—present: Titans

Career statistics
Competition	Test	ODI	T20I	FC
Matches	4	85	42	60
Runs scored	19	883	166	1,761
Batting average	9.50	23.23	9.22	24.45
100s/50s	0/0	0/2	0/0	1/10
Top score	9	69*	27*	107
Balls bowled	250	3,175	748	4,579
Wickets	11	97	50	69
Bowling average	13.36	31.35	22.24	40.49
5 wickets in innings	0	0	0	1
10 wickets in match	0	0	0	0
Best bowling	3/13	4/22	4/24	5/62
Catches/stumpings	2/–	17/–	9/–	26/–
- Source: Cricinfo, 25 June 2026

Andile Lucky Phehlukwayo (born 3 March 1996) is a South African professional cricketer. He is a left handed lower order batsman who bowls right-arm fast-medium. He made his international debut for South Africa in September 2016.

== Early life ==
Phehlukwayo won a bursary to Glenwood High School in Durban for field hockey. He was introduced to cricket by his guardian Rosemary Dismore, who employed his mother as a domestic worker.

== Early and domestic career ==
In January 2014, Phehlukwayo was named in South Africa's 15 man squad for the 2014 Under-19 Cricket World Cup.

Phehlukwayo was included in the KwaZulu-Natal cricket team squad for the 2015 Africa T20 Cup.

In August 2017, Phehlukwayo was named in Jo'burg Giants' squad for the first season of the T20 Global League. However, in October 2017, Cricket South Africa initially postponed the tournament until November 2018, with it being cancelled soon after.

In September 2018, Phehlukwayo was named in KwaZulu-Natal's squad for the 2018 Africa T20 Cup. He was the leading wicket-taker for KwaZulu-Natal in the tournament, with ten dismissals in four matches.

In October 2018, Phehlukwayo was named in Cape Town Blitz's squad for the first edition of the Mzansi Super League T20 tournament. In September 2019, he was named in the squad for the Durban Heat team for the 2019 Mzansi Super League tournament. In April 2021, he was named in KwaZulu-Natal's squad, ahead of the 2021–22 cricket season in South Africa.

On 27 March 2022, in Division One of the 2021–22 CSA One-Day Cup, Phehlukwayo scored his first century in List A cricket, with 100 not out.

== International career ==
In September 2016, Phehlukwayo was named in South Africa's One Day International (ODI) squad for their series against Australia. He made his ODI debut for South Africa against Ireland on 25 September 2016. In January 2017, he was included in South Africa's Twenty20 International (T20I) squad for their series against Sri Lanka. He made his T20I debut for South Africa against Sri Lanka on 20 January 2017.

In June 2017, Phehlukwayo was named in South Africa's Test squad for their series against England, but he did not play. In September 2017, he was named in South Africa's Test squad for their series against Bangladesh. He made his Test debut for South Africa against Bangladesh on 28 September 2017.

In April 2019, Phehlukwayo was named in South Africa's 15 man squad for the 2019 Cricket World Cup. On 23 June 2019, in the match against Pakistan, Phehlukwayo played in his 50th ODI. Following the World Cup, the International Cricket Council (ICC) named Phehlukwayo as the rising star of the squad.

In September 2021, Phehlukwayo was named as one of three reserve players in South Africa's squad for the 2021 ICC Men's T20 World Cup. In September 2023, he was included in South Africa's squad for the 2023 Cricket World Cup.
