= Josh Nicholas =

Australian cricketer (born 1991)

Personal information
- Full name: Josh Bradley Nicholas
- Born: 20 December 1991 (age 34)
- Batting: Right-handed
- Bowling: Right-arm fast
- Role: Bowler

Domestic team information
- Years: Team
- 2015/16–: Western Australia

Career statistics
| Competition | First-class |
|---|---|
| Matches | 5 |
| Runs scored | 255 |
| Batting average | 56.42 |
| 100s/50s | 0/2 |
| Top score | 68* |
| Balls bowled | 675 |
| Wickets | 12 |
| Bowling average | 42.33 |
| 5 wickets in innings | 0 |
| 10 wickets in match | 0 |
| Best bowling | 2/17 |
| Catches/stumpings | 3/– |
- Source: CricketArchive, 28 May 2020

Josh Nicholas (born 20 December 1991) is an Australian cricketer who debuted for Western Australia during the 2015–16 season. He has previously played for Eckington and Ambergate Cricket Clubs in the Derbyshire Premier Cricket League and a single game for the Surrey Second XI.

Nicholas plays for the Perth Cricket Club in Western Australian Grade Cricket.
