= Sam Raphael =

Australian cricketer (born 1987)

Personal information
- Born: 24 May 1987 (age 39); Adelaide, Australia

Domestic team information
- Years: Team
- 2012: South Australia

Career statistics
Competition	FC	List A
Matches	15	4
Runs scored	664	46
Batting average	24.59	11.50
100s/50s	0/3	0/0
Top score	65	21
Balls bowled	0	0
Wickets	–	–
Bowling average	–	–
5 wickets in innings	–	–
10 wickets in match	–	–
Best bowling	–	–
Catches/stumpings	14/–	4/–
- Source: Cricinfo, 9 February 2016

Sam Raphael (born 24 May 1987) is an Australian cricketer. He made his List A debut for South Australia on 5 October 2015 in the 2015–16 Matador BBQs One-Day Cup.
