= Warren Stanlake =

Australian rules footballer

Personal information
- Full name: Warren Stanlake
- Born: 3 September 1958 (age 68)
- Original team: Lavington
- Height: 189 cm (6 ft 2 in)
- Weight: 87 kg (192 lb)

Playing career^{1}
| Years | Club | Games (Goals) |
| 1981 | Footscray | 1 (0) |
- ^{1} Playing statistics correct to the end of 1981.

Warren Stanlake (born 3 September 1958) is a former Australian rules footballer who played with Footscray in the Victorian Football League (VFL).

His son Billy Stanlake is an international cricketer.
