= Australian cricket team in South Africa in 2016–17 =

International cricket tour

	South Africa	Australia
- Dates: 30 September 2016 – 12 October 2016
Captains	Faf du Plessis	Steve Smith

One Day International series
- Results: South Africa won the 5-match series 5–0
Most runs	Rilee Rossouw (311)	David Warner (386)
Most wickets	Andile Phehlukwayo (8)	Chris Tremain (7)
- Player of the series: Rilee Rossouw (SA)

The Australia national cricket team toured South Africa in September and October 2016 playing a series of five One Day Internationals (ODIs) against the hosts and a solitary ODI against Ireland. The Western Province Cricket Association (WPCA) raised concerns with Cricket South Africa (CSA) about the fifth ODI being held on Yom Kippur. The fixture went ahead as planned, but the WPCA asked that matches do not clash with religious days in the future.

South Africa won the series against Australia 5–0, the first time that Australia had lost all five matches in a five-match ODI series.

== Squads ==
South Africa	Australia
Faf du Plessis (c); ~~AB de Villiers (c)~~; Kyle Abbott; Hashim Amla; Farhaan Behardien; Quinton de Kock (wk); JP Duminy; Imran Tahir; David Miller; ~~Chris Morris~~; ~~Wayne Parnell~~; Aaron Phangiso; Andile Phehlukwayo; Dwaine Pretorius; Kagiso Rabada; Rilee Rossouw; Tabraiz Shamsi; Dale Steyn	Steve Smith (c); David Warner; George Bailey; Scott Boland; ~~James Faulkner~~; Aaron Finch; John Hastings; Travis Head; Usman Khawaja; Mitchell Marsh; ~~Shaun Marsh~~; Joe Mennie; Chris Tremain; Matthew Wade (wk); Daniel Worrall; Adam Zampa

Both James Faulkner and Shaun Marsh were ruled out of the tour due to injury. Marsh was replaced with Usman Khawaja, while no replacement was made for Faulkner. Chris Morris suffered a knee injury ruling him out for two months. He was replaced by Dwaine Pretorius. AB de Villiers was ruled out of series due to elbow injury and was replaced by Rilee Rossouw. AB de Villiers was also ruled of subsequent tour of Australia. Wayne Parnell suffered a rib injury in the second ODI and was ruled out of the rest of the series.

== ODIs vs South Africa ==
=== 1st ODI ===
30 September 2016 (D/N)
Scorecard

Australia; 294/9 (50 overs)	v	South Africa; 295/4 (36.2 overs)
George Bailey 74 (90); Andile Phehlukwayo 4/44 (10 overs)		Quinton de Kock 178 (113); Scott Boland 3/67 (7 overs)

South Africa won by 6 wickets
Centurion Park, Centurion
Umpires: Bongani Jele (SA) and Joel Wilson (WI)
Player of the match: Quinton de Kock (SA)

- South Africa won the toss and elected to field.
- Quinton de Kock (SA) made his highest score in an ODI and the highest score by any player in an ODI in South Africa.

=== 2nd ODI ===
2 October 2016
Scorecard

South Africa; 361/6 (50 overs)	v	Australia; 219 (37.4 overs)
Faf du Plessis 111 (93); John Hastings 3/57 (10 overs)		Travis Head 51 (45); Wayne Parnell 3/40 (7 overs)

South Africa won by 142 runs
Wanderers Stadium, Johannesburg
Umpires: Shaun George (SA) and Nigel Llong (Eng)
Player of the match: Faf du Plessis (SA)

- Australia won the toss and elected to field.
- Joe Mennie and Chris Tremain (Aus) both made their ODI debuts.

=== 3rd ODI ===
5 October 2016 (D/N)
Scorecard

Australia; 371/6 (50 overs)	v	South Africa; 372/6 (49.2 overs)
David Warner 117 (107); Imran Tahir 2/54 (10 overs)		David Miller 118* (79); John Hastings 2/79 (10 overs)

South Africa won by 4 wickets
Kingsmead Cricket Ground, Durban
Umpires: Adrian Holdstock (SA) and Joel Wilson (WI)
Player of the match: David Miller (SA)

- Australia won the toss and elected to bat.
- This was the second-highest successful run chase in ODIs.

=== 4th ODI ===
9 October 2016
Scorecard

Australia; 167 (36.4 overs)	v	South Africa; 168/4 (35.3 overs)
Matthew Wade 52 (58); Kyle Abbott 4/40 (8 overs)		Faf du Plessis 69 (87); Chris Tremain 2/48 (10 overs)

South Africa won by 6 wickets
St George's Park Cricket Ground, Port Elizabeth
Umpires: Adrian Holdstock (SA) and Nigel Llong (Eng)
Player of the match: Kyle Abbott (SA)

- Australia won the toss and elected to bat.

=== 5th ODI ===
12 October 2016 (D/N)
Scorecard

South Africa; 327/8 (50 overs)	v	Australia; 296 (48.2 overs)
Rilee Rossouw 122 (118); Joe Mennie 3/49 (10 overs)		David Warner 173 (136); Imran Tahir 2/42 (10 overs)

South Africa won by 31 runs
Newlands Cricket Ground, Cape Town
Umpires: Shaun George (SA) and Joel Wilson (WI)
Player of the match: David Warner (Aus)

- South Africa won the toss and elected to bat.
- David Warner made the highest total for an Australian batsman against South Africa in an ODI.
