= Chadd Sayers =

Australian cricketer (born 1987)

Personal information
- Full name: Chadd James Sayers
- Born: 31 August 1987 (age 39); Adelaide, South Australia
- Nickname: Leo
- Height: 180 cm (5 ft 11 in)
- Batting: Right-handed
- Bowling: Right-arm medium
- Role: Bowler
- Relatives: Dean Sayers (father)

International information
- National side: Australia (2018)
- Only Test (cap 452): 30 March 2018 v South Africa

Domestic team information
- Years: Team
- 2010/11–2020/21: South Australia (squad no. 27)
- 2019: Gloucestershire

Career statistics
Competition	Test	FC	LA
Matches	1	85	16
Runs scored	0	1,597	37
Batting average	0.00	15.35	7.40
100s/50s	0/0	0/3	0/0
Top score	0	58*	14
Balls bowled	294	19,074	855
Wickets	2	320	12
Bowling average	73.00	26.51	64.08
5 wickets in innings	0	16	0
10 wickets in match	0	3	0
Best bowling	2/78	8/64	2/41
Catches/stumpings	1/–	26/–	2/–
- Source: ESPNcricinfo, 11 March 2024

Chadd James Sayers (born 31 August 1987) is a former Australian cricketer from South Australia. After spending several years in the South Australian Grade Cricket League as one of the best pace bowlers in the state, Sayers began playing first-class cricket for South Australia in the Sheffield Shield in 2011. He played matches for Australia A from 2013, and played his only Test for Australia in the final Test of the 2017–18 tour of South Africa at Johannesburg, after years of near misses.

Sayers is a swing bowler who bowls with slower pace than most other bowlers in the modern era. Despite his precision and consistency, his lack of pace has consistently been a barrier to selection for higher levels of cricket. Sayers specializes in first-class cricket and does not play Twenty20s.

Sayers retired from first class cricket at the end of the 2020–21 season.

== Rise through grade cricket (2004–2011) ==
Sayers started his cricket career, after switching from baseball, playing grade cricket with Woodville Cricket Club. Early on, he suffered from stress fractures in his back and was forced to play as a batsman, but he fought through his injuries to become a pace bowler and rise to Woodville's top-level team along with his brother Aaron. In the 2006–07 season, Sayers was the leading wicket-taker in South Australian grade cricket, with 55 wickets at an average of 14.65, and he fell one point short of winning the Bradman medal for the best grade cricketer of the season. As he was in good form in grade cricket, Sayers was given a rookie contract with South Australia's state team for the 2007–08 and 2008–09 seasons. During these two seasons, he took an outstanding 90 wickets in grade cricket and recorded figures of 7/60 in a match for South Australia's Second XI, but he wasn't given any opportunities to play for South Australia and was dropped from their contract list in 2009.

Sayers considered moving interstate to seek opportunities at a higher level, but he stayed in South Australia and his form continued to improve. He took 65 wickets in the 2010–11 season at an average of 8.63, won the Bradman Medal and was finally given the opportunity to play in a first-class match in a Sheffield Shield game against Tasmania. He took two wickets on debut.

== Domestic career (2011–2021) ==
=== Breakout (2011–2013) ===
In 2011, Sayers was given his first full contract with South Australia. He played two more games with South Australia in the 2011–12 Sheffield Shield season, including a five-wicket haul against Victoria, but he had his breakout season in 2012–13. Despite missing almost a month of cricket due to a side strain, Sayers was the leading wicket-taker for the season with 48 wickets at an average of 18.52. He won the Neil Dansie Medal for the best South Australian player of the season and finished just two points behind former Australian Test captain Ricky Ponting, to be second in the Sheffield Shield player of the year.

=== Opportunities with Australia A (2013–2014) ===
Sayers was included in an Australia A squad touring England in the 2013 season before the 2013 Ashes series. This was his first opportunity to play on the international scene, and during the tour he took 11 wickets at an average of 11.54, leading his South Australian coach Darren Berry to say he was a front-runner to play in the Ashes. He did not play in the 2013 Ashes in England, and though he was one of a number of pace bowlers in consideration to play in the 2013–14 Ashes series in Australia which he also did not play in. Instead of making his Test debut, he played in the 2013–14 Sheffield Shield season, taking 36 wickets. In 2014, he continued to play for Australia A, and impressed enough to be on track for national selection with a five-wicket haul against India A.

Sayers continued his good form in the first half of the 2014–15 Sheffield Shield season. In a match against Queensland, he took a hat-trick to tear through Queensland's top order, the first player to take a hat-trick for South Australia since 1977. Tim Ludeman also managed a stumping off of Sayers' bowling, a very unusual dismissal for a pace bowler. Sayers also signed a contract to play for Twenty20 team the Adelaide Strikers in the Big Bash League (BBL) for the first time. Sayers had never played in the BBL and was considered a specialist in the longer forms of cricket. Sayers was unable to play in the BBL and the rest of the Sheffield Shield season due to an ankle injury which required surgery.

=== Test debut near misses (2015–2018) ===
Sayers returned to domestic cricket in November 2015 to play in the 2015–16 Sheffield Shield season. In his first match back, the second match of the season against Western Australia, he took the first three wickets of the match with the new ball. His return from injury and return to form resulted in his selection in the Australian national team for the first time as he was selected in the 14-man Test squad for Australia's tour of New Zealand. He was selected for the tour because it was expected the conditions would suit his style of swing bowling. Though he was unable to make his Test debut, Sayers spent the time in New Zealand honing his skills with Australian fast bowling coach Craig McDermott and veteran Test bowler Peter Siddle. He returned to Australia after the tour to finish off the Sheffield Shield season, and reached new career-best figures of 7/46 against Tasmania in a big innings victory.

Sayers had a good start to the 2016–17 Sheffield Shield season, taking eleven wickets in the second round in another innings victory over Tasmania. He recorded the second-best bowling figures of his career in the first innings with 6/32 and followed it up with 5/44 in the second innings, including two wickets in the first over of the innings. In November 2016, he was again added to Australia's Test squad ahead of the third Test against South Africa. He did not play in the Test, but he was again included in the Australian squad for a match against Pakistan, which he also did not play in. Sayers did not make his Test debut during the 2016–17 season, but he reached the best Sheffield Shield form of his career. He helped take South Australia to the Sheffield Shield final then took 7/84 against Victoria in the match. He finished the season with 62 wickets, again the most in the competition, and again won the Neil Dansie Medal.

Sayers was selected for Australia A again in 2017 for their tour of South Africa, but the tour plans were derailed when a pay dispute erupted between Cricket Australia and the Australian Cricketers' Association. Sayers was put in financial uncertainty by the pay dispute as his three-year contract had come to an end, and the players agreed to boycott the Australia A tour if an agreement had not been reached before its commencement. A new agreement wasn't reached in time and the tour was cancelled, all but ending any chance Sayers had of making his Test debut for Australia in their Bangladesh tour.

In June 2019, Sayers signed with Gloucestershire for the 2019 County Championship as an injury replacement for Daniel Worrall. He played four matches for the club and took 11 wickets at an average of 36.36.

== International career ==
In November 2017, he was named in Australia's Test squad for the 2017–18 Ashes series, but was replaced by Mitchell Marsh ahead of the third Test.

He replaced the injured Jackson Bird in Australia's Test squad for their tour of South Africa in February to April 2018. He made his Test debut in the final test of the series on 30 March 2018, replacing the injured Mitchell Starc. His first Test wicket was that of former South African captain AB De Villiers, in a double wicket over that also included Kagiso Rabada.

Sayers was not selected for the next Test tour, against Pakistan in late 2018, and did not play any more Tests.

== Grade cricket ==
While Sayers played professionally for South Australia, he also continued to play grade cricket for Woodville Cricket Club. As he continued to improve his game, he also became Woodville's captain. At the same time as Sayers played for the club, his brother Aaron Sayers (a top-order batsman) was the vice-captain. After they had become the captain and vice-captain, their father Dean Sayers (a former first-class cricketer for South Australia) became the club's coach and kept his sons in their leadership roles. In 2014, the club sought to replace Aaron as vice-captain because it saw all three Sayers being so heavily involved in leadership as being a conflict of interest. As a result, Dean Sayers quit coaching the club with a year left on his contract and both Sayers brothers left the club. Aaron Sayers joined Port Adelaide Cricket Club and Chadd Sayers joined Glenelg Cricket Club.

== Player profile ==
Sayers is a fast-medium bowler capable of getting late outswing against right-handed batsmen. Unlike most other pace bowlers of the 21st century, Sayers is not a very fast bowler, instead focusing on precision and swing to take wickets. His abilities lend themselves to success even on pitches not considered to help pace bowlers. Sayers has been called an "old-fashioned" cricketer as he does not bowl with significant pace to frighten batsmen or have many variations on his bowling, both major elements of pace bowling in the era of Twenty20 cricket. Former Test cricketer Ashley Mallett has compared Sayers to past Australian swing bowlers Bob Massie and Terry Alderman because of his patience and focus.

In his early career, Sayers was considered to be too short and too slow of a bowler to succeed at higher levels of cricket, which made it more difficult for him to force his way into the South Australian state team, and his slower pace continued to plague him when he was struggling to force his way into the Australian national team as Australian coach Darren Lehmann has said he prefers bowlers capable of bowling faster than 140 km/h, a speed which Sayers cannot reach.

Sayers specializes in first-class cricket rather than List A cricket or Twenty20 cricket. Despite being the leading wicket-taker in the Sheffield Shield on multiple occasions, he has been consistently overlooked by Twenty20 franchises in Australia due to his lack of pace and variations. Not being able to play Twenty20 cricket has been a disadvantage for Sayers. The Sheffield Shield breaks for two months in the middle of the summer to make way for the Big Bash League, Australia's franchise Twenty20 competition. As Sayers does not have a Twenty20 team, this often means he spends months in the middle of the cricket season unable to play cricket. In addition to this, it is difficult for players without a Twenty20 team to earn a pay rise, putting Sayers at a financial disadvantage for not having a Twenty20 team.
