= Jason Borgas =

Australian cricketer (born 1981)

Personal information
- Full name: Jason Daniel Borgas
- Born: 3 September 1981 (age 45)
- Batting: Left-handed
- Bowling: Right-arm medium
- Role: Batsman

Domestic team information
- Years: Team
- 2007/08: South Australia

Career statistics
Competition	First-class
Matches	6
Runs scored	417
Batting average	34.75
100s/50s	0/4
Top score	95
Catches/stumpings	7/–
- Source: Cricinfo, 18 May 2018

Jason Daniel Borgas (born 3 September 1981) is an Australian cricketer. He played six first-class matches for South Australia in 2007.
