= Travis Dean =

Australian cricketer

Personal information
- Full name: Travis Jeffrey Dean
- Born: 1 February 1992 (age 34); Williamstown, Victoria, Australia
- Batting: Right-handed
- Bowling: Right-arm medium
- Role: Opening batsman

Domestic team information
- Years: Team
- 2015/16–2023/24: Victoria
- 2018/19–2021/22: Melbourne Stars

Career statistics
Competition	FC	List A	T20
Matches	72	12	3
Runs scored	3,609	306	50
Batting average	29.82	30.60	16.66
100s/50s	8/16	1/0	0/0
Top score	154*	119	32
Catches/stumpings	46/–	4/–	0/–
- Source: Cricinfo, 14 February 2023

Travis Jeffrey Dean (born 1 February 1992) is an Australian cricketer who has played first-class cricket for Victoria.

Dean came to attention playing premier cricket for Footscray-Edgewater, and was one of the competition's top batsmen in the 2014–15 season. Following these performances, Dean was selected to make his first-class debut for Victoria at age 23 on 28 October 2015, in a day-and-night Sheffield Shield match. In the match he made two unbeaten centuries opening the batting, with scores of 154 not out and 109 not out, making him the first player to score centuries in both innings on debut in the Sheffield Shield competition, and the second Australian player after Arthur Morris to do so on first-class debut.

In his second first-class match Dean reached 347 first-class runs before being dismissed, beating the world record set by Border's Ray Watson-Smith, who got to 310 career runs in 1969–70 before being dismissed in his third match. Dean scored a century in the 2015–16 Shield final, finishing his debut Shield season with 807 runs at 44.83.

Dean made his List A debut for Cricket Australia XI against the Pakistanis during their tour of Australia on 10 January 2017. He made his Twenty20 debut for Melbourne Stars in the 2018–19 Big Bash League season on 21 December 2018.
