= Billy Stanlake =

Australian cricketer

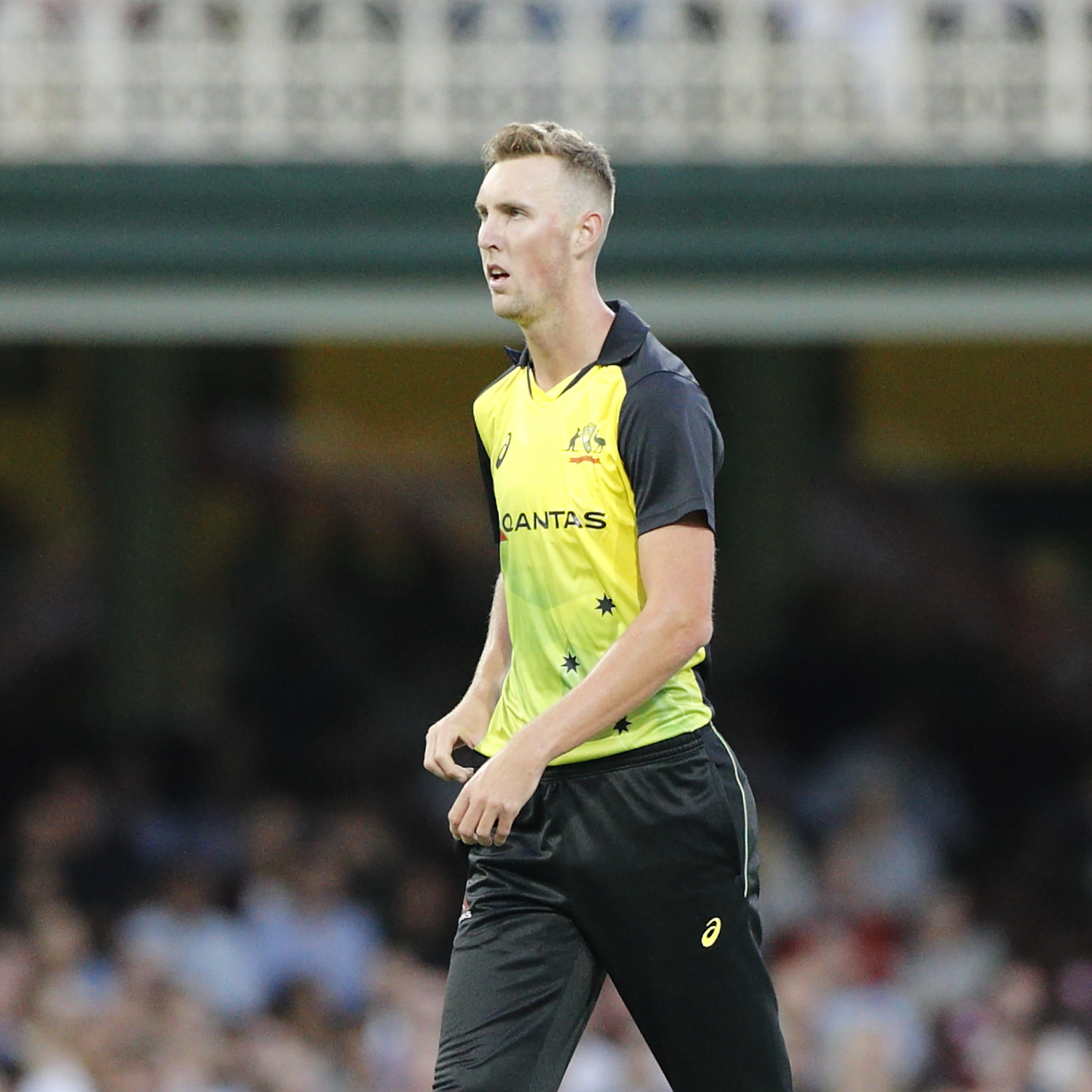
- Stanlake in 2018

Personal information
- Full name: Billy James Stanlake
- Born: 4 November 1994 (age 32); Hervey Bay, Queensland, Australia
- Height: 204 cm (6 ft 8 in)
- Batting: Left-handed
- Bowling: Right-arm fast
- Role: Bowler

International information
- National side: Australia (2017–present)
- ODI debut (cap 218): 13 January 2017 v Pakistan
- Last ODI: 18 September 2026 v Zimbabwe
- ODI shirt no.: 37 (formerly 52)
- T20I debut (cap 85): 17 February 2017 v Sri Lanka
- Last T20I: 8 November 2019 v Pakistan
- T20I shirt no.: 37 (formerly 52)

Domestic team information
- Years: Team
- 2015/16–2022: Queensland
- 2015/16–2019/20: Adelaide Strikers
- 2017: Royal Challengers Bangalore
- 2018: Sunrisers Hyderabad
- 2020/21-2021/22: Melbourne Stars
- 2021: Derbyshire
- 2022/23-present: Tasmania
- 2023/24-present: Hobart Hurricanes

Career statistics
Competition	ODI	T20I	FC	LA
Matches	9	19	13	49
Runs scored	4	9	71	30
Batting average	1.33	9.00	8.87	3.00
100s/50s	0/0	0/0	0/0	0/0
Top score	2	7	13*	8*
Balls bowled	416	420	2,017	2,426
Wickets	7	27	40	59
Bowling average	54.28	20.14	26.92	36.42
5 wickets in innings	0	0	0	0
10 wickets in match	0	0	0	0
Best bowling	3/35	4/8	4/35	4/24
Catches/stumpings	1/–	0/–	3/–	7/–
- Source: ESPNcricinfo, 20 September 2026

Billy James Stanlake (born 4 November 1994) is an Australian cricketer. He is a fast bowler who represented Australia in the 2014 Under-19 Cricket World Cup and played One Day International and Twenty20 International cricket for the full national team. He plays domestic cricket for the Tasmania cricket team and the Hobart Hurricanes in the Big Bash League. Stanlake is the tallest person to ever represent Australia in international cricket, standing at 204 cm.

== Early life ==
Stanlake was born in Hervey Bay, Queensland and spent the first six years of his life on the Fraser Coast. There, he and his brother played Australian rules football for the Hervey Bay Bombers, encouraged to do so by their father Warren Stanlake who played for the Footscray Football Club in the professional Victorian Football League. The family then relocated to the Gold Coast in 2001, where Billy began playing cricket for Southport-Labrador and attended The Southport School (TSS). He represented TSS's First XI cricket team in their back-to-back 2010-11 GPS Premiership years and was awarded the Westcott Family Trophy for First XI bowler of the year in both seasons. Stanlake made his first grade debut for the Gold Coast Dolphins at 16 years of age in October 2011.

== Youth career ==
After switching to cricket, Stanlake was a very successful youth cricketer in both domestic and international competitions. He represented his home state of Queensland in the 2013 under-19 national championships and took fourteen wickets in three matches, including bowling figures of 6/30 and 5/40.

Stanlake played for Australia's youth team, being named in their squad for both the 2012 and 2014 Under-19 World Cups. He faced a foot injury before the 2012 World Cup and was unable to play, but although he had another foot injury ahead of the 2014 World Cup, he was able to recover in time to participate. During the tournament he had both the best bowling average and economy rate of the Australian bowlers, taking five wickets at an average of 19.40 with an economy rate of 3.34 runs per over.

During his youth career Stanlake played twelve youth One Day Internationals for Australia from 2011 to 2014. His best bowling performance came in 2011, when he was still sixteen years old, against Sri Lanka. He took four wickets for 37, taking out most of Sri Lanka's top order. Overall he took 13 wickets in youth ODIs at an average of 29.92.

== Rise to international cricket (2014–present) ==
=== Domestic debuts (2014–2016) ===
In the wake of his Under-19 World Cup performances, Stanlake was offered a rookie contract with the Queensland state cricket team for the 2014–15 season, but he missed the entire season due to stress fractures in his back. He instead made his debut in all three major formats of cricket (first-class, one-day and Twenty20) in the 2015–16 season.

Stanlake was named in Queensland's squad for the first time for the 2015–16 Matador BBQs One-Day Cup, and he made his List A debut on 5 October 2015 against Tasmania. After impressive performances of 3/43 against South Australia and 4/37 against Western Australia in the Matador Cup, Stanlake was also picked in a Cricket Australia XI squad to play a match against touring New Zealanders.

Because of his injury history, Stanlake did not start the 2015–16 Sheffield Shield season in Queensland's team, but after he took figures of 4/26 playing grade cricket for Gold Coast he was brought into the team. He made his first-class debut on 14 November 2015 against South Australia and took four wickets for 63 runs in South Australia's second innings to secure victory for Queensland. During the mid-season break for the 2015–16 Big Bash League Stanlake played for South Australian team the Adelaide Strikers. On 28 December 2015 he made his debut for the Strikers. He took no wickets, but only conceded 18 runs in his three overs, bowling quickly at a speed of 140 km/h. Former English Test cricketer Andrew Flintoff commented that it was likely he'd be able to lift his pace even higher in the future.

=== International debuts (2016–2017) ===
Stanlake was upgraded from a rookie contract to a full contract with Queensland in 2016, but further back injuries made him unavailable for the 2016–17 Matador BBQs One-Day Cup. Injury kept Stanlake out of cricket for a total of ten months, but after returning he quickly shot his way up to national selection within months.

Stanlake was in strong form during the 2016–17 Big Bash League season. His pace was increasing and getting closer to 150 km/h, particularly on the New Year's Eve match when he took three wickets for 17 in 3.2 overs. The selectors for Australia's national team decided to rest their fast bowlers Josh Hazlewood and Mitchell Starc in January 2017 because of an upcoming tour of India, and they felt that Stanlake's unusual height and fast pace could both be strong assets in international cricket, so he was named in Australia One Day International (ODI) squad for their series against Pakistan.

Stanlake's selection was a shock even to Stanlake himself, and he was still very inexperienced. At the time of his selection he had only played two first-class matches and four one-day matches for Queensland. He made his ODI debut for Australia against Pakistan on 13 January 2017. He was struck down by illness after bowling just three overs, but bounced back in his second match to take his first wicket, dismissing Shoaib Malik. In February 2017 Stanlake was also named in Australia's Twenty20 International (T20I) squad for their series against Sri Lanka. He made his T20I debut for Australia against Sri Lanka at the Melbourne Cricket Ground on 17 February 2017, but he was dropped from the team immediately because of his disappointing bowling performance of 0/41.

In February 2017, he was bought by the Royal Challengers Bangalore for the 2017 Indian Premier League for 30 lakhs, and in April he was given a Cricket Australia contract. Usually players are given Cricket Australia contracts because they are expected to play for the national team often in the next twelve months, but Stanlake's was given with the intention of keeping an eye on him as a potential player of the future.

=== BBL 07 and Trans-Tasman Tri-Series (2017–19) ===
Stanlake started the 2017–18 with injury again, getting a toe infection after neglecting to look after a cut in his big toe. The infection was severe enough that it could have caused the toe to be amputated. He returned in time to play for the Strikers in BBL|07, taking eleven wickets in ten matches for the team, but he missed the final (in which the Strikers won the tournament for the first time) because he had been included in Australia's squad for the 2017–18 Trans-Tasman Tri-Series.

Stanlake began the tri-series in Australia's convincing win over New Zealand. Stanlake came on to bowl in the second over and took two wickets with his first two balls, then took another in the fourth over. After this New Zealand were 3/16 and Australia went on to win easily in a rain-affected match. Stanlake finished with figures of 3/15, only conceding one boundary in his four overs, and was named the man of the match for the first time in just his second Twenty20 International. He was virtually unplayable and consistently performed, opening the bowling throughout the tri-series.

In January 2018, he was bought by the Sunrisers Hyderabad in the 2018 IPL auction. The following month, he was signed by Yorkshire County Cricket Club to play in the 2018 T20 Blast in England. However, in April 2018, Stanlake suffered a fractured finger during an IPL match against Chennai Super Kings, ruling him out of the rest of the tournament.

In April 2018, he was awarded a national contract by Cricket Australia for the 2018–19 season. In May 2019, Stanlake was once again signed to play in the t20 Blast in England, this time for Derbyshire County Cricket Club. However, in July 2019, Stanlake was ruled out of playing for Derbyshire due to injury.

In May 2022, he joined the Tasmania cricket team, after leaving the Queensland cricket team.

== Player profile ==
Stanlake is a right-arm fast bowler who often opens the bowling. His bowling is known for its impressive bounce and pace, as his height gives him a good angle for bounce and he can bowl at a speed of 150 km/h and swing the ball. He has mostly played Twenty20 cricket, being rested from longer formats due to stress fracture injuries.

Stanlake is one of the tallest Australian cricketers of all time at 204 cm in height. He is the tallest player to ever represent Australia in international cricket, and the only domestic Australian cricketer to be taller than him was New South Welsh bowler Phil Alley, who was 208 cm tall.

== Personal life ==
Stanlake comes from a sporting family with his father Warren a former VFL player for Footscray and his brother Jack formerly contracted with the Gold Coast Football Club, though he never played an AFL match.
