= Chris Tremain (cricketer) =

Australian cricketer

Personal information
- Full name: Christopher Peter Tremain
- Born: 10 August 1991 (age 35); Dubbo, New South Wales, Australia
- Batting: Right-handed
- Bowling: Right-arm medium-fast
- Role: Bowler

International information
- National side: Australia (2016)
- ODI debut (cap 216): 2 October 2016 v South Africa
- Last ODI: 12 October 2016 v South Africa
- ODI shirt no.: 99

Domestic team information
- Years: Team
- 2011/12–2013/14: New South Wales (squad no. 26)
- 2012/13–2014/15: Sydney Thunder
- 2013/14: Northern Districts
- 2014/15–2019/20: Victoria (squad no. 99)
- 2015/16–2018/19: Melbourne Renegades (squad no. 14)
- 2019/20–2020/21: Sydney Thunder
- 2020/21–2025/26: New South Wales (squad no. 26)
- 2023–2024: Northamptonshire (squad no. 20)

Career statistics
Competition	ODI	FC	LA	T20
Matches	4	96	37	52
Runs scored	23	1,349	316	80
Batting average	23.00	13.09	18.58	13.33
100s/50s	0/0	1/1	0/1	0/0
Top score	23*	111	50	37*
Balls bowled	240	17,301	1,815	1,081
Wickets	7	353	57	46
Bowling average	36.42	23.54	29.92	31.45
5 wickets in innings	0	13	2	0
10 wickets in match	0	1	0	0
Best bowling	3/64	7/82	5/25	3/9
Catches/stumpings	1/–	23/–	9/–	12/–
- Source: ESPNcricinfo, 4 October 2024

Christopher Peter Tremain (born 10 August 1991) is an Australian former cricketer who played for New South Wales and Victoria in the Sheffield Shield.

== Domestic career ==
Tremain made his state-level debut for New South Wales in the 2011–12 season. In July 2012, he was given a state contract with New South Wales for the first time. By the end of the 2013–14 season he had played six first-class matches for the state. In April 2014 he moved interstate and signed a new contract with Victoria.

== International career ==
In September 2016, Tremain was named in the Australian national team's squad for a One Day International (ODI) series in South Africa. Tremain was one of three fast bowlers selected for the series who had never represented Australia before, as the team needed to cover for injuries and resting players. Tremain made his debut in the second ODI of the series at Wanderers Stadium. He opened the bowling for Australia alongside fellow debutant Joe Mennie, the first time since 1996–97 that a pair of Australian debutants had opened the bowling together. Both bowled poorly. Tremain took a wicket but conceded 78 runs in his 10 overs, and Mennie conceded 82 runs without taking a wicket (the worst ever bowling figures by Australian debutant).

== Later career ==
In March 2017, he scored his maiden first-class century in the Sheffield Shield match against Western Australia. In March 2018, Cricket Australia named Tremain in their Sheffield Shield team of the year. He was the leading wicket-taker in the 2017–18 Sheffield Shield season, with 51 dismissals in ten matches. Following the conclusion of the 2017–18 Sheffield Shield, Cricket Victoria named him the Sheffield Shield player of the season, winning the Bill Lawry Medal. In November 2018, he was named in Australia's Test squad for the series against India, but he did not play a game in the series.

In June 2020, Tremain signed with New South Wales ahead of Australia's 2020–21 domestic cricket season, returning to the team where he started his domestic career. Despite the move, Tremain was left out of the New South Wales team for the entire summer. He did not play his first game back with New South Wales until November 2021, by which point it had been 634 days since his last first-class match. He took a wicket with his first ball of the match and three wickets in his first two overs to have bowling figures of 3/2. In the last five matches of the season he took 24 wickets at an average of 15.95 and was named as New South Wales' men's player of the season.

In September 2022, Tremain signed with the Hobart Hurricanes for the BBL|12 season. Although he featured as 12th man many times in the BBL|12 season, Tremain did not make the starting XI for any games. The BBL|13 season was the first season Tremain went unsigned by any franchise.

In December 2023 it was reported that Tremain would be joining Northamptonshire for the opening four rounds of the 2024 County Championship after a successful 3 game spell in 2023.

Following his diagnosis of Parsonage-Turner Syndrome in 2024, Tremain announced his retirement from cricket in February 2026.
