= Daniel Worrall =

Australian and English cricketer

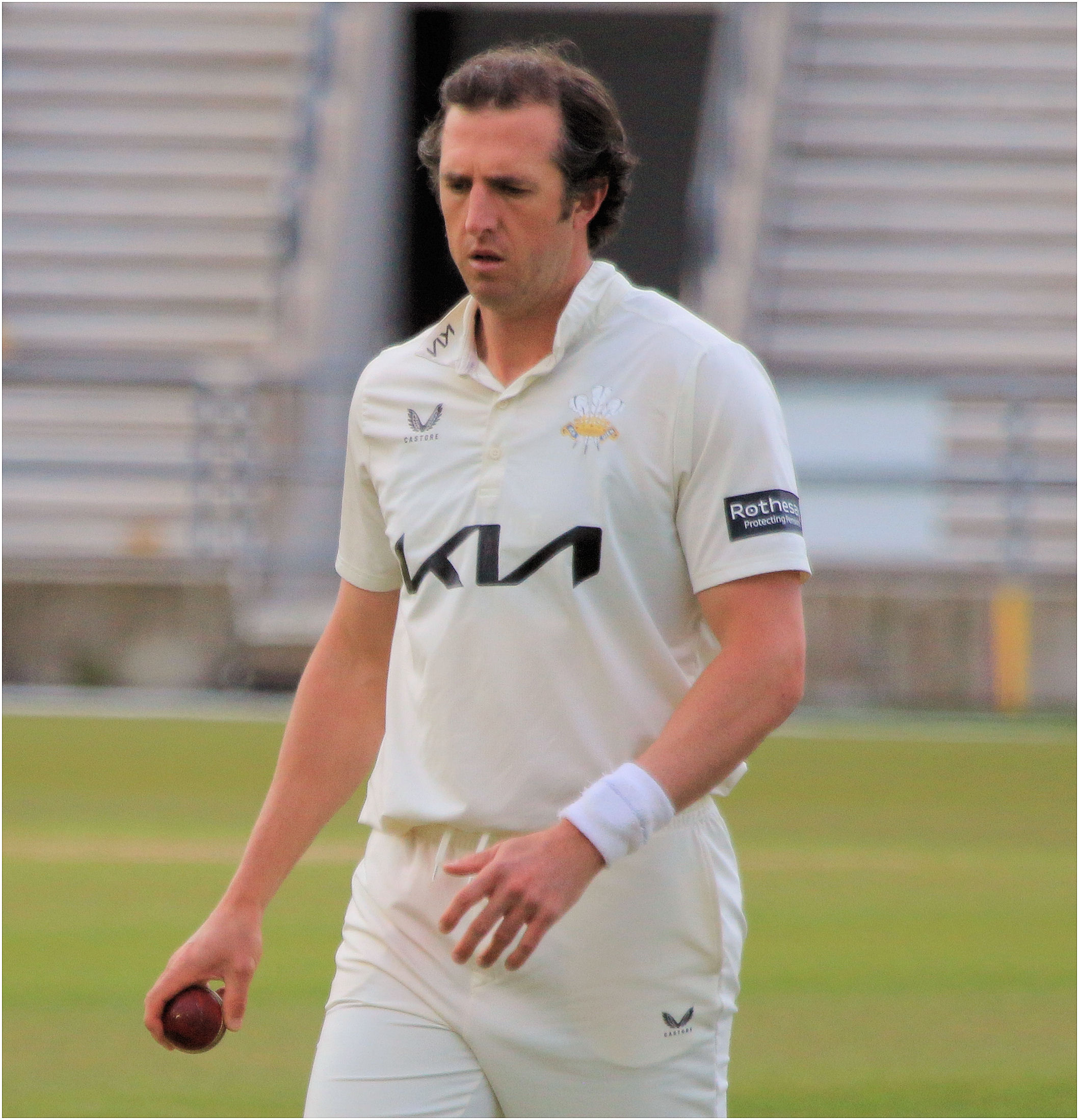
- Worrall in the 2026 County Championship

Personal information
- Full name: Daniel James Worrall
- Born: 10 July 1991 (age 35); Melbourne, Victoria, Australia
- Nickname: Franky
- Height: 6 ft 2 in (188 cm)
- Batting: Right-handed
- Bowling: Right-arm fast-medium
- Role: Bowler

International information
- National side: Australia (2016)
- ODI debut (cap 214): 27 September 2016 v Ireland
- Last ODI: 5 October 2016 v South Africa

Domestic team information
- Years: Team
- 2012/13–2021/22: South Australia
- 2013/14–2019/20: Melbourne Stars
- 2018–2021: Gloucestershire
- 2020/21: Adelaide Strikers
- 2022–present: Surrey
- 2023/24: Sunrisers Eastern Cape
- 2024–2025: London Spirit
- 2025: Gulf Giants
- 2026: Joburg Super Kings
- 2026: Southern Brave

Career statistics
Competition	ODI	FC	LA	T20
Matches	3	113	45	125
Runs scored	6	1,357	130	178
Batting average	–	13.84	10.00	11.86
100s/50s	0/0	0/2	0/0	0/1
Top score	6*	51	31*	62*
Balls bowled	158	22,903	2,263	2,417
Wickets	1	433	51	110
Bowling average	171.00	25.30	39.45	28.26
5 wickets in innings	0	17	1	0
10 wickets in match	0	3	0	0
Best bowling	1/43	7/64	5/62	4/23
Catches/stumpings	1/–	31/–	17/–	28/–
- Source: Cricinfo, 27 September 2026

Daniel James Worrall (born 10 July 1991) is an Australian and English cricket right-arm fast-medium bowler who has played for Surrey since 2022. He played for South Australia in the Sheffield Shield competition and for the Adelaide Strikers in the Big Bash League. He was selected to play for Australia in 2016. Born to a British father and Irish mother, he holds British citizenship and lives in England. He will be classed as an international player in Australian competitions.

== Career ==
=== Early career (2012–2015) ===
Worrall started his career playing for Melbourne Cricket Club in Victorian Premier Cricket, but he moved to Adelaide when he was offered a rookie contract with South Australia for the 2012–13 season. He made his first-class debut against Queensland in 2012, but he struggled to maintain a spot in the state side consistently for the next few years.

=== Breakout and international career (2015–present) ===
Worrall's breakout came in the 2015–16 Sheffield Shield season and BBL|05. He recorded his first 5 wicket haul in first-class cricket when he took figures of 5/69 against Victoria in the first innings. He followed this up in the second innings with three more wickets as the Redbacks went on to win by 8 wickets. He made headlines at the end of BBL|05 when, after starting the season outside of the Melbourne Stars' squad, he was brought into the team because other members of the team's pace attack were called up to play for Australia. In the final match of the regular season he took figures of 3/15 against the Perth Scorchers to help guarantee the Stars a home semi-final, a performance that David Hussey described as "world-class". He followed this up in the semi-final, also against the Scorchers, by taking 3/25 in another win. His form continued to improve over the rest of the Sheffield Shield season, with career-best figures of 6/96 against Victoria in the Sheffield Shield final in the absence of fellow Redbacks fast bowler Chadd Sayers. He finished the season as the second-highest wicket taker of the Sheffield Shield, with 44 wickets at an average of 26.18, and as a result he was named by the South Australian Cricket Association as the most improved player for the 2015–16 season, having gone from a fringe member of the squad to one of the key members of the South Australian pace attack.

Worrall's improvement warranted selection in the Australia A squad for a 2016 quadrangular series in northern Queensland, during which he took figures of 4/26 against India A, his best figures in a List A match. After the series, despite having only played 12 List A matches in his career, he was added to the Australian national squad for their tour of South Africa. He made his ODI debut for Australia against Ireland on 27 September 2016.

Worrall played for South Australia in the 2017–18 JLT One-Day Cup. Worrall opened the bowling against Victoria in the elimination final, bowling a wide on the first ball but recovering to then bowl Aaron Finch for a golden duck in the same over. He finished the match with figures of 5/62 as Victoria fell short of South Australia's score and they advanced through to the final.

=== English County career ===
In February 2018, Gloucestershire signed Worrall as their overseas player for the 2018 County Championship. In 2019, he re-signed with Gloucestershire, ahead of the 2019 County Championship in England. He returned to Gloucestershire for the 2021 season. He made his first appearance in the third game against Hampshire after missing the start of the season due to quarantine requirements.

On 27 July 2021 Worrall signed for Surrey as a local player on a three-year contract which started from the 2022 summer. Worrall has a UK passport so will not count as an overseas player for Surrey. Worrall was part of the Surrey team that won the 2022 County Championship.

In April 2022, he was bought by the Manchester Originals for the 2022 season of The Hundred.

In July 2023 Worrall was selected by the London Spirit for the 2023 season of The Hundred as an injury replacement for fast bowler Olly Stone. On 21 August 2023 Worrall signed a new multi-year contract with Surrey

Based on his success in England, there were reports that Worrall would switch his allegiances to England.

== Awards ==
Worrall was named as one of the 2025 Wisden Cricketers of the Year.

== Bowling style ==
Worrall bowls a fast-medium pace and makes use of swing in his bowling. He has a distinctive angled run-up, one of the strangest in domestic Australian cricket. He developed this run-up in his childhood, where there was an inconveniently placed tree in his backyard which made a direct approach to the crease impossible with the long run-up required for pace bowling.
