= Joe Mennie =

Australian cricketer (born 1988)

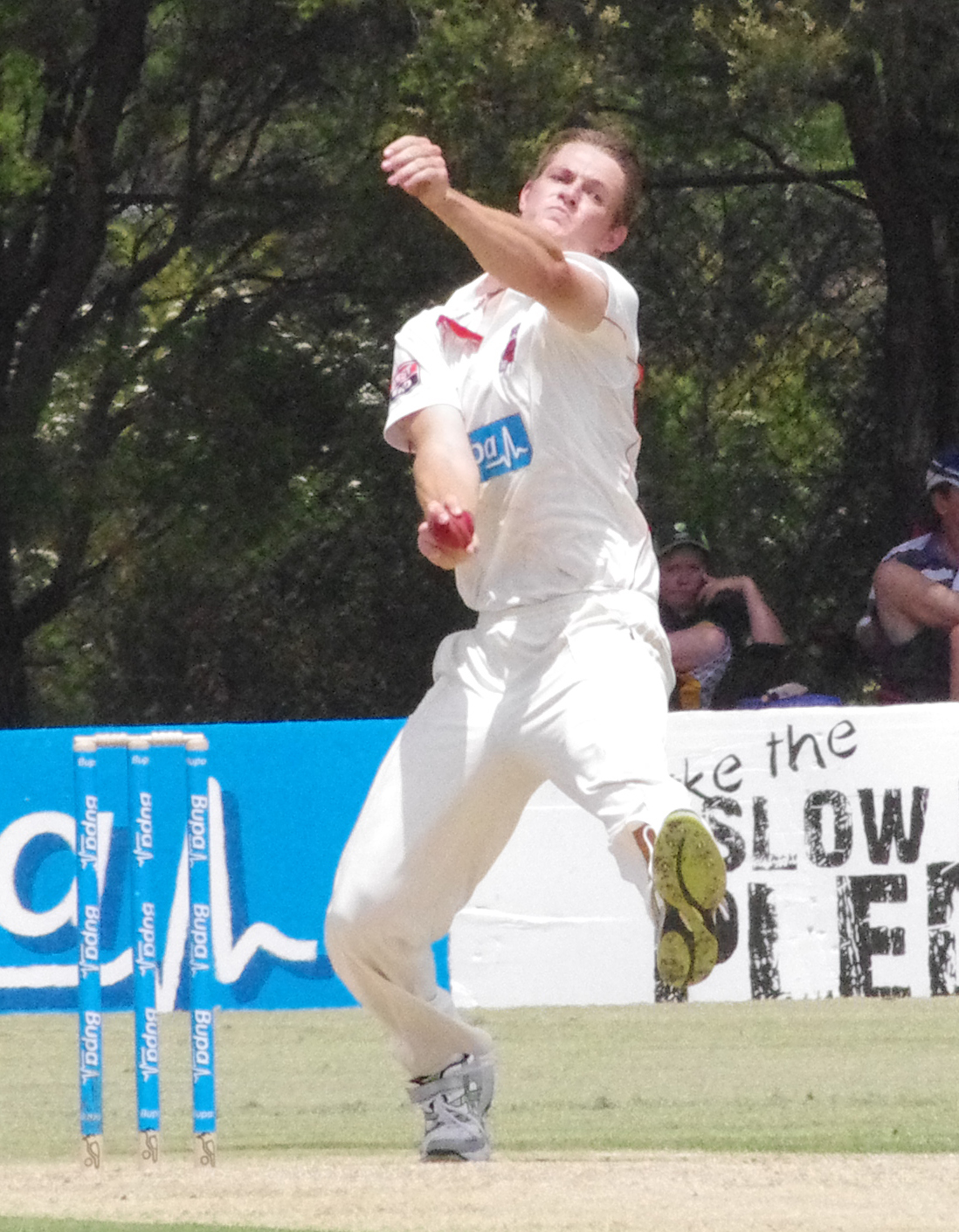

Personal information
- Full name: Joe Matthew Mennie
- Born: 24 December 1988 (age 37); Coffs Harbour, New South Wales, Australia
- Batting: Right-handed
- Bowling: Right-arm fast-medium
- Role: Bowler

International information
- National side: Australia (2016)
- Only Test (cap 446): 12 November 2016 v South Africa
- ODI debut (cap 215): 2 October 2016 v South Africa
- Last ODI: 12 October 2016 v South Africa
- ODI shirt no.: 16

Domestic team information
- Years: Team
- 2011/12–2020/21: South Australia
- 2012/13–2013/14: Perth Scorchers
- 2013/14–2015/16: Hobart Hurricanes
- 2016/17: Sydney Sixers
- 2017/18–2019/20: Melbourne Renegades
- 2018: Lancashire

Career statistics
Competition	Test	ODI	FC	LA
Matches	1	2	79	50
Runs scored	10	1	1,934	342
Batting average	5	0.50	17.74	11.40
100s/50s	0/0	0/0	0/8	0/0
Top score	10	1	79*	43*
Balls bowled	168	120	16,312	2,475
Wickets	1	3	297	58
Bowling average	85.00	43.66	26.17	35.75
5 wickets in innings	0	0	8	1
10 wickets in match	0	0	0	0
Best bowling	1/85	3/49	7/96	5/36
Catches/stumpings	0/–	0/–	31/–	6/–
- Source: ESPNcricinfo, 5 December 2021

Joe Matthew Mennie (born 24 December 1988) is an Australian professional cricketer. He is a right-arm fast-medium bowler for South Australia, the representative team of the South Australian Cricket Association, and in the 2017–18 Big Bash League season he will begin playing for the Melbourne Renegades, his fourth BBL team.

Mennie lived in New South Wales for most of his early life and made his way through the ranks of New South Wales cricket to be part of New South Wales' Second XI in 2010, but he did not see many further opportunities for him there and moved to South Australia where he quickly made both his first-class and List A cricket debuts. His bowling improved over time until he became the leading wicket-taker in the Sheffield Shield in 2015–16. As a result, he joined the Australia A squad in 2016 and made both his One Day International and Test debuts in the 2016–17 season.

== Early life ==
Mennie grew up in Coffs Harbour, New South Wales, but as a teenager he moved to Nelson Bay, New South Wales. While living in Nelson Bay, he played cricket for grade cricket club Western Suburbs in nearby Newcastle. At the time he played as a batting all-rounder, but once his body matured he became a specialist fast bowler. At the age of 17 Mennie moved back to Coffs Harbour and quickly broke into both the New South Wales Country Colts team and the Western Suburbs District Cricket Club in Sydney Grade Cricket. In 2010, he also broke into New South Wales' Second XI, but he saw that he would have limited opportunities to play for the state team, so in 2011 he moved to Adelaide to play for Adelaide University Cricket Club and he was given a rookie contract with South Australia's state team.

== Early domestic career (2011–2016) ==
In October 2011 he made both his List A and first-class cricket debuts for the Redbacks. His first big haul came against Western Australia when he took figures of 7/96, including the last five wickets of the innings to bowl out Western Australia and keep the Redbacks in the game. He took the second-most wickets by a South Australian for the Sheffield Shield season with 23 wickets at an average of 26.26. He was signed to the Perth Scorchers in the Big Bash League Twenty20 competition, along with Ryan Duffield in December 2011 to replace the injured Mitchell Johnson and Mark Cameron. However, he didn't make his Twenty20 debut until October 2012, when he played in the Scorchers opening match against the Titans in the 2012 Champions League Twenty20.

In the 2012–13 Sheffield Shield season, Mennie improved on his form from the previous season. His best performance was 6/43, helping the Redbacks to bowl out Victoria cricket team for just 136 runs. He became the fourth-highest wicket taker in the competition with 33 wickets at an average of 22.03 despite only playing six matches. Mennie also proved his usefulness as a lower order batsman with a score of 79 not out, his maiden first-class half-century, against Queensland. He followed up less successfully in the 2013–14 Sheffield Shield season with only 19 wickets and went into a lull for the next couple of season. He wasn't in good form in Twenty20 cricket either and changed teams from the Scorchers to the Hobart Hurricanes.

Mennie came back into the spotlight in the 2015–16 Sheffield Shield season. Despite not having any five-wicket innings for the entire season, he led all of the bowlers with 51 wickets at an average of 21.21. He was a major reason for South Australia advancing to their first Sheffield Shield final since 1996, so he was awarded the Neil Dansie medal at the end of the season for being South Australia's most outstanding player for the whole season. He also won the Lord Hampen Trophy for being the state's best first-class cricketer of the season. As a result of his outstanding season, he was selected to play for Australia A, Australia's second team, during the 2016 winter. In August 2016, he signed with the Sydney Sixers for the upcoming BBL|06. This was now his third BBL team.

== International debuts and Sheffield Shield dominance (2016–present) ==
In September 2016, Mennie was named in Australia's One Day International (ODI) squad for their tour to South Africa. Mennie was surprised that his international debut would come in one of the shorter forms of the game given he had had more success in first-class matches than in List A matches. His form in the previous season's one-day tournament was poor, only taking seven wickets with an average of 50.85 and conceding more than 5 runs per over throughout. Mennie made his ODI debut for Australia against South Africa on 2 October 2016, and he broke the record for the worst bowling figures by an Australian on debut while Australia were demolished by 142 runs. Mennie bowled 10 overs and conceded 82 runs without taking a wicket. The loss was Australia's second biggest loss to South Africa and their fifth biggest loss of all time.

Despite his poor performances in the ODI series in South Africa, Mennie was chosen to be part of Australia's squad for the Test series against South Africa. He was chosen over one of Australia's more established pace bowlers, Jackson Bird, because of his stronger lower order batting in the Sheffield Shield. He wasn't named in Australia's team for the first match of the series and he was relieved of his 12th man duties so that he could play for South Australia in a Sheffield Shield match. When Peter Siddle suffered a back injury in the first Test, Mennie was brought into the Australian side to make his Test debut. Mennie made his Test debut on 12 November 2016. His baggy green cap was presented by Ben Hilfenhaus and Temba Bavuma of South Africa was his first test wicket.

After his debut Mennie did not remain in the Test team, and he began playing for the Sydney Sixers in BBL|06. After playing two matches, he was struck in the head with a cricket ball while bowling at training and was admitted to hospital with a "minor brain bleed". He was released from hospital two days later and was cleared to fly to Brisbane for the Sixers' semi-final, though he did not play in the match himself. Mennie then returned to Shield cricket and finished the season strongly with figures of 5/67 and 4/21 against Tasmania to take South Australia through to their second final in a row.

In October 2021, Mennie announced retirement from state cricket.

In February 2022, it was announced that Mennie had signed for Oxton Cricket Club, in Wirral.

== Player profile ==
Mennie is not a particularly fast bowler, only bowling in the 130–135 km/h range. Instead of using sheer pace to take wickets, he relies on consistency and accuracy. His bowling action is front-on, different to most pace bowlers but comparable to former Test cricket Max Walker. Because of his height, Mennie benefits from good bounce in his bowling. His best ball is his leg cutter, which he can use to turn the ball away from right-handed batsmen and bring slip fielders into play.
