= Benaud–Qadir Trophy =

Test cricket series between Australia and Pakistan

Benaud–Qadir Trophy بینو قادر ٹرافی
- Countries: Australia; Pakistan
- Administrator: Cricket Australia; Pakistan Cricket Board
- Format: Test cricket
- First edition: 2021–22 (Pakistan)
- Latest edition: 2023–24 (Australia)
- Tournament format: Test series
- Number of teams: 2
- Current trophy holder: Australia (2nd)
- Most successful: Australia (2)
- Most runs: (Australia) Usman Khawaja (716)
- Most wickets: (Australia) Pat Cummins (31)
- TV: List of broadcasters

The Benaud–Qadir Trophy is a Test cricket series played between the men's cricket teams of Australia and Pakistan. It was launched in March 2022 during Australia's tour of Pakistan. The trophy is named after Richie Benaud and Abdul Qadir, who were both prolific cricketers and exponents of leg spin bowling for their respective nations. Both nations have shared a formidable cricket rivalry at times.

Under the agreement reached between Cricket Australia (CA) and the Pakistan Cricket Board (PCB), all bilateral Test series between the two teams from 2022 onward would be played under the Benaud–Qadir Trophy.

== Results ==
Year	Host	Winning team
2021–22	Pakistan	Australia
2023–24	Australia	Australia
2025-26	TBD	TBD

Total Series	Australia	Pakistan	Drawn
2	2	0	0

== Background ==
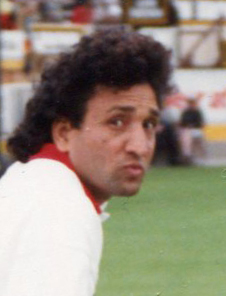
Left: Richie Benaud. Right: Abdul Qadir.

Below is a summary of all Test series played prior to the Benaud–Qadir Trophy between Australia and Pakistan from 1956 to 2019, covering a 63-year period. Australia and Pakistan competed against each other in 25 Test series, with Australia winning 13, Pakistan winning seven, and five Test series ending in a draw. In terms of Test matches, the two sides played against each other a total of 66 times, out of which Australia won 33 matches, Pakistan won 15 matches, and 18 matches were drawn. The first ever Test match between the two sides was played in October 1956 in Karachi, which Pakistan won by nine wickets.

Pakistan hosted 12 series, from 1956 onward; between Australia's tours of 1998 and 2022, all of Pakistan's home series were held on neutral venues like the United Arab Emirates (UAE), Sri Lanka and England due to the security situation in Pakistan post-2002. Australia hosted 13 series, from 1964 onward.

Pakistan played Test matches against Australia on Australian soil on 37 occasions, out of which they won four times and drew seven times but did not win a Test series; they also played Australia in home matches held on neutral venues on nine occasions, in which they defeated Australia four times and drew once, including prominent series victories in 2014 and 2018 in the UAE. Pakistan clinched five of their seven series victories in home conditions – 1956, 1980, 1982, 1988 and 1994, winning seven and drawing 10 of their total of 20 home games.

Of their 20 matches played against Pakistan on Pakistani soil, Australia won three times and drew 10 times, including historical series victories in 1959 and 1998; they also defeated Pakistan in neutral venues four times and drew once out of nine occasions, including a series victory in 2002 in Sri Lanka and the UAE. Australia seized 10 of their 13 series victories in home conditions – 1972–73, 1981, 1983–84, 1990, 1995, 1999, 2004–05, 2009–10, 2016–17 and 2019, winning 26 and drawing seven of their total of 37 home games.

Five Test series between Australia and Pakistan were drawn. Of these, the series of October 1964 was held in Pakistan; the series of December 1964, 1976–77 and 1979 were held in Australia, while the series of 2010 was held in the neutral venues of England.

Season	Host	Tests	Australia	Pakistan	Drawn	Result
1956–57	Pakistan	1	0	1	0	Pakistan
1959–60	Pakistan	3	2	0	1	Australia
1964–65	Pakistan	1	0	0	1	Drawn
1964–65	Australia	1	0	0	1	Drawn
1972–73	Australia	3	3	0	0	Australia
1976–77	Australia	3	1	1	1	Drawn
1978–79	Australia	2	1	1	0	Drawn
1979–80	Pakistan	3	0	1	2	Pakistan
1981–82	Australia	3	2	1	0	Australia
1982–83	Pakistan	3	0	3	0	Pakistan
1983–84	Australia	5	2	0	3	Australia
1988–89	Pakistan	3	0	1	2	Pakistan
1989–90	Australia	3	1	0	2	Australia
1994–95	Pakistan	3	0	1	2	Pakistan
1995–96	Australia	3	2	1	0	Australia
1998–99	Pakistan	3	1	0	2	Australia
1999–2000	Australia	3	3	0	0	Australia
2002–03 (N)	Pakistan	3	3	0	0	Australia
2004–05	Australia	3	3	0	0	Australia
2009–10	Australia	3	3	0	0	Australia
2010 (N)	Pakistan	2	1	1	0	Drawn
2014–15 (N)	Pakistan	2	0	2	0	Pakistan
2016–17	Australia	3	3	0	0	Australia
2018–19 (N)	Pakistan	2	0	1	1	Pakistan
2019–20	Australia	2	2	0	0	Australia
Total	25	66	33	15	18	Australia: 13 Pakistan: 7 Drawn: 5

Notes

- Italics and (N) indicate a home series for Pakistan that was held in a neutral venue.
- Source: ESPNcricinfo.

== Benaud–Qadir Trophy series ==
Years	Host	Tests	Australia	Pakistan	Drawn	Result	Holder	Player of the series
2021–22	Pakistan	3	1	0	2	Australia	Australia	(Australia) Usman Khawaja
2023–24	Australia	3	3	0	0	Australia	Australia	(Australia) Pat Cummins
Total		6	4	0	2			

Total Series	Australia	Pakistan	Drawn
2	2	0	0

- Source: ESPNcricinfo.

== Match venues ==
The following is a full list of venues for Test matches played between Pakistan and Australia since 1956, along with match records. Venues that have featured in the Benaud–Qadir Trophy are in green. Venues that no longer host matches are in red.

Locations of Benaud–Qadir Trophy Tests within Pakistan. Italics indicate locations of Tests played prior to the Benaud–Qadir Trophy.
Locations of Tests played in Australia prior to the Benaud–Qadir Trophy.
Locations of Tests played in neutral venues prior to the Benaud–Qadir Trophy. Note: Dacca (then in East Pakistan) hosted one home Test in 1959.

In Pakistan
Stadium	Province	First Test	Last Test	Played	Pakistan wins		Draws	Australia wins		Ref
National Stadium, Karachi	Sindh	1956–57	2021–22	9	5	1994	4	0	–	
Dacca Stadium, Dacca	East Pakistan	1959–60	1959–60	1	0	–	0	1	1959	
Gaddafi Stadium, Lahore	Punjab	1959–60	2021–22	6	1	1982	3	2	2022	
Iqbal Stadium, Faisalabad	Punjab	1979–80	1988–89	3	1	1982	2	0	–	
Rawalpindi Cricket Stadium, Rawalpindi	Punjab	1994–95	2021–22	3	0	–	2	1	1998	
Arbab Niaz Stadium, Peshawar	Khyber Pakhtunkhwa	1998–99	1998–99	1	0	–	1	0	–	
In Australia
Stadium	State	First Test	Last Test	Played	Australia wins		Draws	Pakistan wins		Ref
MCG, Melbourne	Victoria	1964–65	2023–24	11	7	2023	2	2	1981	
Adelaide Oval, Adelaide	South Australia	1972–73	2019–20	5	2	2019	3	0	–	
SCG, Sydney	New South Wales	1972–73	2023–24	9	6	2024	1	2	1995	
WACA Ground, Perth	Western Australia	1978–79	2004–05	5	5	2004	0	0	–	
Perth Stadium, Perth	Western Australia	2023–24	2023–24	1	1	2023	0	0	–	
The Gabba, Brisbane	Queensland	1981–82	2019–20	6	5	2019	1	0	–	
Bellerive Oval, Hobart	Tasmania	1995–96	2009–10	3	3	2010	0	0	–	
In neutral venues
Stadium	Country	First Test	Last Test	Played	Pakistan wins		Draws	Australia wins		Ref
P Saravanamuttu Stadium, Colombo	Sri Lanka	2002–03	2002–03	1	0	–	0	1	2002	
Sharjah Cricket Stadium, Sharjah	United Arab Emirates	2002–03	2002–03	2	0	–	0	2	2002	
Lord's, London	England	2010	2010	1	0	–	0	1	2010	
Headingley, Leeds	England	2010	2010	1	1	2010	0	0	–	
Dubai International Cricket Stadium, Dubai	United Arab Emirates	2014–15	2018–19	2	1	2014	1	0	–	
Sheikh Zayed Cricket Stadium, Abu Dhabi	United Arab Emirates	2014–15	2018–19	2	2	2018	0	0	–	

== Media coverage ==
The series is broadcast through PTV Sports in Pakistan and Fox Sports in Australia. Globally, coverage has been available via Sony in the rest of South Asia including India, Etisalat in the Middle East and North Africa, Sky Sports in the United Kingdom, Sky Sport in New Zealand, SuperSport in Sub-Saharan Africa, Flow Sports in the Caribbean and Willow in North America, with ICC TV and Daraz serving as the live streaming partners.

== See also ==
- Australia–Pakistan relations
- Border–Gavaskar Trophy
- Warne–Muralitharan Trophy
