= List of Test cricket triple centuries =

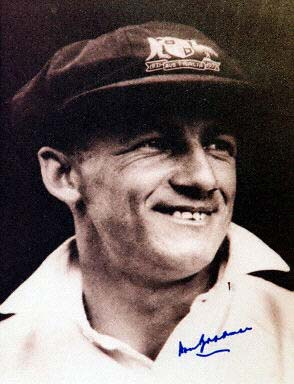
Australian Donald Bradman is one of only four players in Test cricket to have scored 300 or more runs in a single innings on more than one occasion. The others are Brian Lara and Chris Gayle (both West Indies), and Virender Sehwag (India).

A triple century (an individual score of 300 runs or more) in Test cricket has been scored on 33 occasions by 29 batsmen from eight of the twelve Test-cricket playing nations. No player from Afghanistan, Bangladesh, Ireland or Zimbabwe has scored 300. A batsman scoring a Test triple century is slightly rarer than a bowler taking a Test hat-trick (33 triple centuries versus 46 hat-tricks as of October 2024).

No triple centuries have yet been scored in women's Test cricket.

== History ==
The first Test triple century was achieved by Andy Sandham of England against the West Indies in 1930 in the first Test series hosted in the West Indies. The quickest Test triple-century was scored in 4 hours 48 minutes, by Wally Hammond for England against New Zealand at Auckland in 1932–33. The fastest Test triple-century by number of balls faced, where that figure is recorded, is Virender Sehwag's 278-ball triple century for India against South Africa in the first Test of the Future Cup in Chennai in 2008.

Donald Bradman (Australia), Brian Lara (West Indies), Virender Sehwag (India), and Chris Gayle (West Indies) are the only batsmen to reach 300 more than once. Lara's 400 not out against England in 2004, his second Test triple-century, is the highest score in Test cricket and the only instance of a Test quadruple century; Lara is also the only player to have surpassed 350 twice. Bradman also scored 299 not out against South Africa in 1932. Sehwag also scored 293 off 254 balls in the third Test between Sri Lanka and India in December 2009. On an all-round note, Gooch, Jayasuriya, Gayle, and Clarke are the only triple centurions to have also bowled and taken wickets in the same match as scoring a 300: there has not yet been a triple centurion who kept wicket in the same match (Sangakkara and McCullum were both regular keepers for their nations, but both were playing purely as batsmen in the matches where they scored their respective 300s). Simpson, Gooch, Taylor, Lara (2004), Jayawardene, Khan, Clarke, McCullum and Mulder are the only batsmen to score triple centuries as captain.

On 10 October 2024, Harry Brook joined the list, becoming the first England player since Graham Gooch did so in 1990 to score 300+.

The two cricket grounds with the most triple centuries scored at them are Headingley in Leeds, England, and the Antigua Recreation Ground in St. John's, Antigua and Barbuda, both with three. The most triple centuries scored by players from one country is eight, by Australia.

== Innings ==
=== Key ===
	Description
*	denotes that the batsman remained not out.
†	denotes that the total was the highest Test match score at the time.
(c)	denotes that the batsman was captain.
Innings	denotes which of the team's batting innings the triple century was scored in.
Test	denotes the number of the Test match played in that series.
Date	denotes the date the match started on.
^	denotes that the total was the highest Test match score by a captain at the time.

No	Score	Batsman	For	Against	Innings	Test	Ground	Date	Note	Ref
1	325 †	Andy Sandham	England	West Indies	1st	4th	Sabina Park, Kingston	3 April 1930		
2	334 †	Donald Bradman	Australia	England	1st	3rd	Headingley, Leeds	11 July 1930		
3	336* †	Wally Hammond	England	New Zealand	1st	2nd	Eden Park, Auckland	31 March 1933		
4	304	Donald Bradman	Australia	England	1st	4th	Headingley, Leeds	20 July 1934		
5	364 †	Len Hutton	England	Australia	1st	5th	The Oval, London	20 August 1938		
6	337	Hanif Mohammad	Pakistan	West Indies	2nd	1st	Kensington Oval, Bridgetown	17 January 1958		
7	365* †	Garfield Sobers	West Indies	Pakistan	1st	3rd	Sabina Park, Kingston	26 February 1958		
8	311 (c) ^	Bob Simpson	Australia	England	1st	4th	Old Trafford, Manchester	23 July 1964		
9	310*	John Edrich	England	New Zealand	1st	3rd	Headingley, Leeds	8 July 1965		
10	307	Bob Cowper	Australia	England	1st	5th	Melbourne Cricket Ground	11 February 1966		
11	302	Lawrence Rowe	West Indies	England	1st	3rd	Kensington Oval, Bridgetown	6 March 1974		
12	333 (c) ^	Graham Gooch	England	India	1st	1st	Lord's Cricket Ground, London	26 July 1990		
13	375 †	Brian Lara	West Indies	England	1st	5th	Antigua Recreation Ground, St John's	16 April 1994		
14	340	Sanath Jayasuriya	Sri Lanka	India	1st	1st	R. Premadasa Stadium, Colombo	2 August 1997		
15	334* (c) ^	Mark Taylor	Australia	Pakistan	1st	2nd	Arbab Niaz Stadium, Peshawar	15 October 1998		
16	329	Inzamam-ul-Haq	Pakistan	New Zealand	1st	1st	Gaddafi Stadium, Lahore	1 May 2002		
17	380 †	Matthew Hayden	Australia	Zimbabwe	1st	1st	WACA Ground, Perth	9 October 2003		
18	309	Virender Sehwag	India	Pakistan	1st	1st	Multan Cricket Stadium, Multan	28 March 2004		
19	400* † (c) ^	Brian Lara	West Indies	England	1st	4th	Antigua Recreation Ground, St John's	10 April 2004		
20	317	Chris Gayle	West Indies	South Africa	1st	4th	Antigua Recreation Ground, St John's	29 April 2005		
21	374 (c)	Mahela Jayawardene	Sri Lanka	South Africa	1st	1st	Sinhalese Sports Club, Colombo	27 July 2006		
22	319	Virender Sehwag	India	South Africa	1st	1st	M. A. Chidambaram Stadium, Chennai	26 March 2008		
23	313 (c)	Younis Khan	Pakistan	Sri Lanka	1st	1st	National Stadium, Karachi	21 February 2009		
24	333	Chris Gayle	West Indies	Sri Lanka	1st	1st	Galle International Stadium	15 November 2010		
25	329* (c)	Michael Clarke	Australia	India	1st	2nd	Sydney Cricket Ground	3 January 2012		
26	311*	Hashim Amla	South Africa	England	1st	1st	The Oval, London	19 July 2012		
27	319	Kumar Sangakkara	Sri Lanka	Bangladesh	1st	2nd	Zohur Ahmed Chowdhury Stadium, Chittagong	5 February 2014		
28	302 (c)	Brendon McCullum	New Zealand	India	2nd	2nd	Basin Reserve, Wellington	18 February 2014		
29	302*	Azhar Ali	Pakistan	West Indies	1st	1st	Dubai International Cricket Stadium, Dubai	13 October 2016		
30	303*	Karun Nair	India	England	1st	5th	M. A. Chidambaram Stadium, Chennai	16 December 2016		
31	335*	David Warner	Australia	Pakistan	1st	2nd	Adelaide Oval, Australia	30 November 2019		
32	317	Harry Brook	England	Pakistan	1st	1st	Multan Cricket Stadium, Multan	7 October 2024		
33	367* (c)	Wiaan Mulder	South Africa	Zimbabwe	1st	2nd	Queen's Sports Club , Bulawayo	6 July 2025		

== By country ==
Triple centurions in Tests by country
Team	Triple centuries	Players
Australia	8	7
West Indies	6	4
England	6	6
Pakistan	4	4
Sri Lanka	3	3
India	3	2
South Africa	2	2
New Zealand	1	1
Total	33	29

== By player ==
Players with multiple triple centuries
Player	Triple centuries
(Australia) Donald Bradman	2
(Cricket West Indies) Brian Lara	2
(Cricket West Indies) Chris Gayle	2
(India) Virender Sehwag	2

== By ground ==
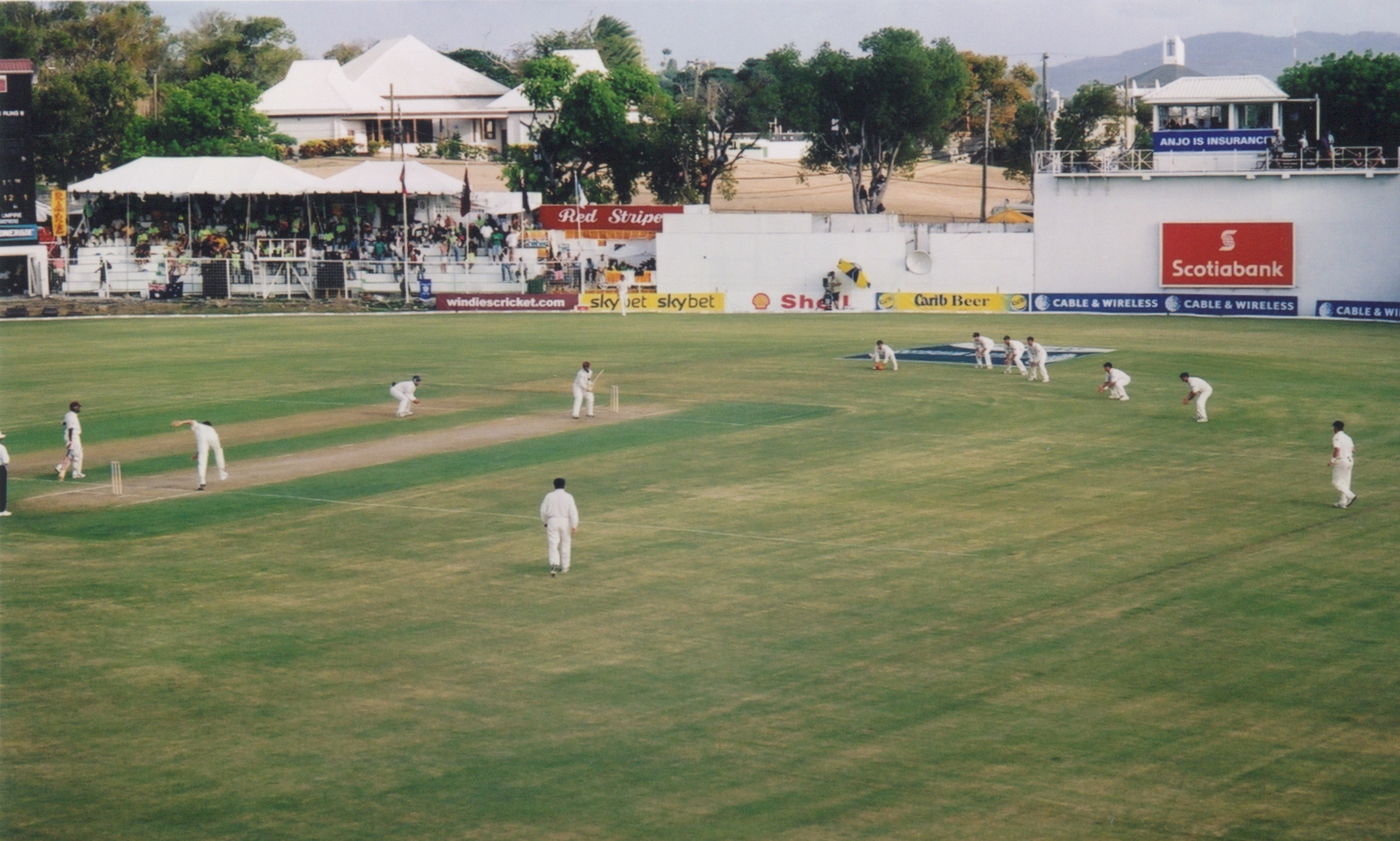
Three triple centuries have been scored at Antigua Recreation Ground.

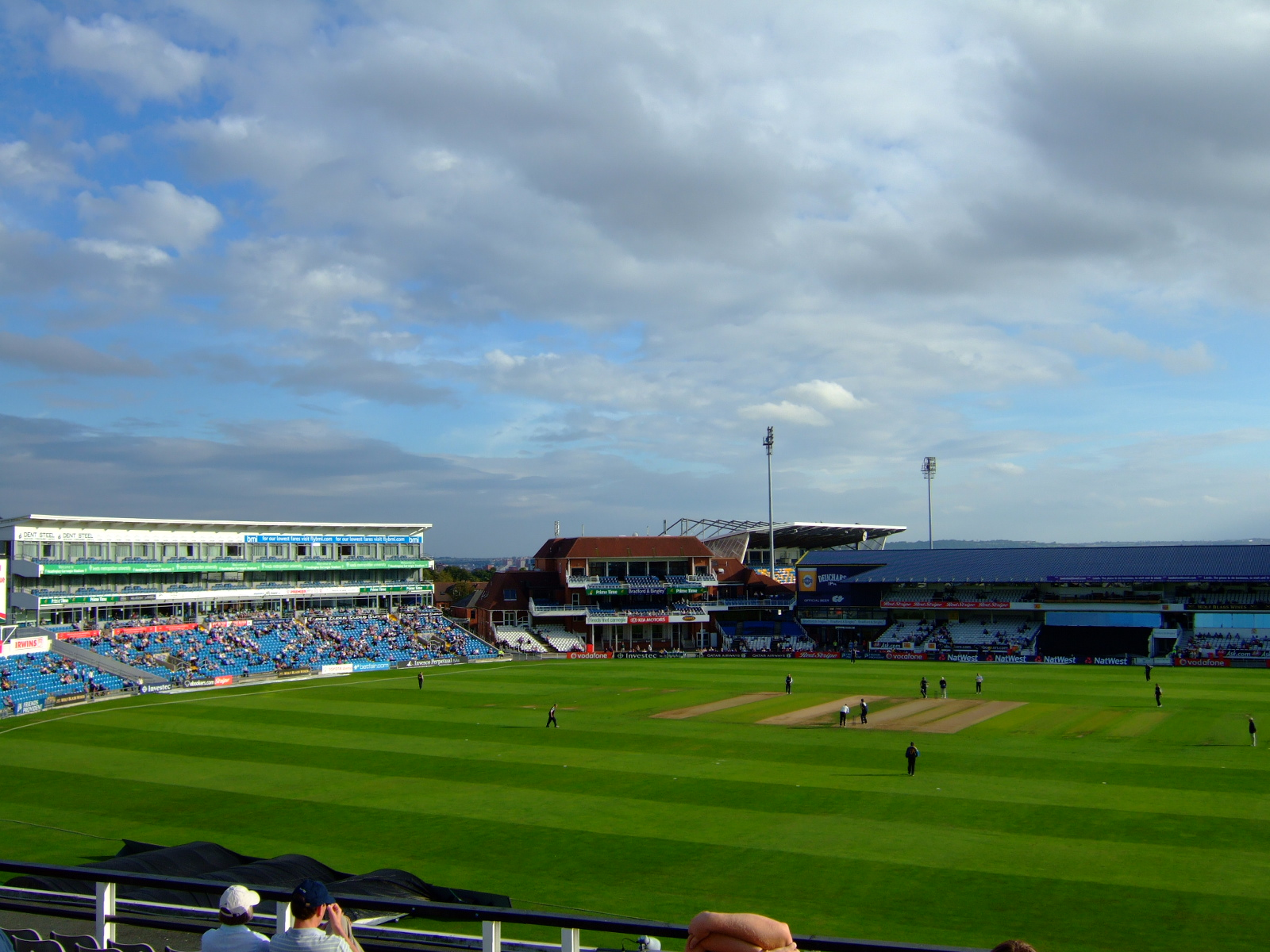
Three triple centuries have been scored at Headingley.

and

Grounds involved in multiple Test triple centuries
Ground	Triple centuries
(Antigua and Barbuda) Antigua Recreation Ground, St John's	3
(England) Headingley, Leeds	3
(Barbados) Kensington Oval, Bridgetown	2
(England) The Oval, London	2
(India) M. A. Chidambaram Stadium, Chennai	2
(Jamaica) Sabina Park, Kingston	2
(Pakistan) Multan Cricket Stadium, Multan	2

== Notes ==
1. Batting first, in a timeless Test, Sandham shared stands of 173 with George Gunn (85) for the first wicket, 148 with Bob Wyatt (58) for the second wicket, and 249 with Leslie Ames (149) for the fourth wicket, on the way to an England total of 849. West Indies replied with 286, but England did not enforce the follow-on, setting West Indies a target of 835 to win. After bad weather prevented any play on the match's eighth day, a draw was agreed with West Indies at 408 for 5, George Headley having scored 223. It was the first triple hundred in Tests. Sandham was 39 years and 275 days old, and playing his last Test match: he is Test cricket's oldest triple-centurion. He had also scored 50 in the second innings, for a match total of 375 which remained a record until 1974 (GS Chappell, 247* and 133).
2. Bradman came in to bat after Australia had lost Archie Jackson off the eleventh ball of the match. He shared stands of 192 with Bill Woodfull (50) for the second wicket and 229 with Alan Kippax (77) for the third wicket, and helped Australia to a total of 566. Bradman was 105* at lunch, 220* at tea and 309* at the close of the first day's play. It is the only instance in Tests of a batsman scoring 300 in a day. Bradman scored 200 in 214 minutes. England scored 391 in reply, including a century from Wally Hammond (113). Forced to follow on, they salvaged a draw.
3. Batting second, in a three-day match, Hammond shared a stand of 149 with Eddie Paynter (36) for the third wicket, on the way to an England total of 548 for 7 declared. New Zealand had batted first, scoring 158. Hammond reached 300 in 287 minutes, going between 200 and 300 in 48 minutes. It has been estimated that he received about 355 balls to get there. Hammond hit 10 sixes in his innings, three off them off consecutive balls from Jack Newman. The third day was affected by rain, and the match was drawn. Hammond made 227 in his previous innings against New Zealand and finished the two-match series with a batting average of 563.
4. Batting second, Bradman shared a stand of 388 with Bill Ponsford (181) for the fourth wicket on the way to an Australian total of 584, in reply to England's 200 all out. Bradman came in to join Ponsford after Australia had lost their first three wickets for 39. England salvaged a draw. This was Bradman's second successive triple century in matches at Headingley, in only his second match at the ground. Shortly before his dismissal his average in Test matches at Headingley stood at 638.
5. Batting first, Hutton shared stands of 382 with Maurice Leyland (187) for the second wicket, 135 with Wally Hammond (59) for the third wicket, and 215 with Joe Hardstaff junior (169*) for the sixth wicket, on the way to an England total of 903 for 7 declared, the first time a Test team scored over 900. Hutton was dismissed with the score at 770, the greatest number of runs added during one batsman's Test innings. Don Bradman and Jack Fingleton were both unable to bat in either Australia innings, and England won by a Test record margin of an innings and 579 runs.
6. Hanif shared stands of 152 with Imtiaz Ahmed (97) for the first wicket, 112 with Alimuddin (37) for the second wicket, 154 with Saeed Ahmed (65) for the third wicket, and 121 with Wazir Mohammad (35) for the fourth wicket, on the way to a Pakistan score of 657 for 8 declared. His 970-minute innings is the longest in Test cricket and was the only instance of a Test triple century scored in a team's second innings until Brendon McCullum's in 2014. Pakistan had followed on, having scored 106 in the first innings in reply to West Indies' 579 for 9 declared, including centuries for Conrad Hunte (142) and Everton Weekes (197). The six-day Test match was drawn.
7. Batting second, Sobers shared stands of 446 with Conrad Hunte (260) for the second wicket, and 188 unbroken with Clyde Walcott (88*) for the fourth wicket, on the way to a West Indies total of 790 for 3 declared. It was Sobers' first hundred in Test cricket. Pakistan had batted first, scoring 328, including a century for Imtiaz Ahmed (122), but their bowling was hampered by injuries to Mahmood Hussain (torn hamstring in his first over), Nasim-ul-Ghani (broken finger after bowling 15 overs) and Abdul Kardar (broken finger before the match even began, nevertheless bowling 37 overs against doctor's orders). Wazir Mohammad scored 106 in Pakistan's second innings, but could not prevent West Indies winning by an innings and 174 runs: Pakistan's two centurions in the match were the only players who did not bowl during West Indies' innings.
8. Batting first, Simpson shared stands of 201 with Bill Lawry (106) for the first wicket and 219 with Brian Booth (98) for the fifth wicket, on the way to an Australian total of 656 for 8 declared. Ken Barrington (256) and Ted Dexter (174) ensured that the match was drawn, England scoring 611. This was also the first instance of a captain scoring a triple century in tests.
9. Batting first, Edrich shared stands of 369 with Ken Barrington (163) for the second wicket and 109 with Peter Parfitt (32) for the fourth wicket, on the way to an England total of 546 for 4 declared. England won by an innings and 187 runs. Edrich hit a Test record 52 boundaries in addition to five sixes in his innings and was on the field for every ball of the match.
10. Batting second, Cowper shared stands of 212 with Bill Lawry (108) for the third wicket and 172 for the fourth wicket with Doug Walters (60) on the way to a total of 543 for 8 declared (the lowest total to include a Test triple-hundred). England had batted first, scoring 485 including a century for Ken Barrington (115). The match was drawn. A wet outfield meant that Cowper's innings included only 20 fours but 26 threes.
11. Batting second, Rowe shared stands of 126 with Roy Fredericks (32) for the first wicket and 249 with Alvin Kallicharran (119) for the second wicket, on the way to a West Indies total of 596. England had batted first, scoring 395 including a century for Tony Greig (148). Keith Fletcher scored 129* in England's second innings and the match was drawn.
12. Batting first, Gooch – reprieved on 36 when edging the ball to keeper Kiran More, who dropped a regulation catch – shared stands of 127 with David Gower (40) for the second wicket, 308 with Allan Lamb (139) for the third wicket, and 192 with Robin Smith (100*) for the fourth wicket. England declared on 653 for 4. With centuries from Ravi Shastri (100) and Mohammad Azharuddin (121), and Kapil Dev's four sixes in a row off Eddie Hemmings with the last man in, India saved the follow on. Graham Gooch hit a second century (123) in England's second innings (the first instance in any form of cricket of a triple-century and a century in the same match) and India lost by 247 runs. As of 2023, Gooch's 456 runs in the match remains the Test record. The England captain also took one wicket and two catches, plus a direct-hit run-out to dismiss India's last man and win the match.
13. Batting first, Lara shared stands of 179 with Jimmy Adams (59) for the third wicket, 183 with Keith Arthurton (47) for the fourth wicket, and 219 with Shivnarine Chanderpaul (75*) for the fifth wicket, on the way to a West Indies total of 593 for 5 declared. In reply, England also scored 593, with centuries for Mike Atherton (135) and Robin Smith (175). The match was drawn.
14. Batting second, Jayasuriya shared a stand of 576 with RS Mahanama (225) for the second wicket, on the way to a Test record total of 952 for 6 declared. Sri-Lanka's second wicket stand was the highest in Test history, was Sri Lanka's first in Test cricket over 400 runs, and is the only instance of two batsmen batting throughout two uninterrupted days of a Test match. India had batted first, scoring 537 for 8 declared with centuries from Navjot Singh Sidhu, Sachin Tendulkar and Mohammad Azharuddin, Jayasuriya taking three wickets in addition to his later feats with the bat. The match was drawn.
15. Batting first, Taylor shared stands of 279 with Justin Langer (116) for the second wicket, 123 with Mark Waugh (77) for the third wicket, and an undefeated 168 for the fifth wicket with Ricky Ponting (76*), on the way to an Australian total of 599 for 4 declared. Pakistan hit 580 in reply, including centuries for Saeed Anwar (126) and Ijaz Ahmed (155). Most of the play on the third day was lost, and the match was drawn. The Australian captain scored 103 runs before lunch on the second day of the match, but it was a three-hour session. Taylor deliberately declared with his score on 334 so as not to overtake the highest score by an Australian of Don Bradman. Taylor also scored 92 in Australia's second innings, falling just short of Gooch's achievements of 1990, totalling 426 in the match.
16. Batting first, Inzamam shared stands of 204 with Imran Nazir (127) for the third wicket and 111 with Saqlain Mushtaq (30) for the seventh wicket. He was last out with the Pakistan score on 643. New Zealand were bowled out for 73, followed on, and were defeated by an innings and 324 runs inside three days.
17. Batting first, Hayden shared stands of 207 with Steve Waugh (59) for the fourth wicket and 233 with Adam Gilchrist (113*) for the sixth wicket, on the way to an Australian total of 735 for 6 declared. Hayden hit thirty-eight fours and eleven sixes, scored 102 between tea and stumps on day one and 105 runs between lunch and tea on the second day. Australia won by an innings and 175 runs.
18. Batting first, Sehwag shared stands of 160 with Akash Chopra (42) for the first wicket and 336 with Sachin Tendulkar (194*) for the third wicket, on the way to an Indian total of 675 for 5 declared. India won by an innings and 52 runs, despite Yousuf Youhana scoring 117 in Pakistan's second innings (following on). It is first Test triple hundred reached with a six.
19. Batting first, Lara (captain), who was playing in his 106th Test, shared stands of 232 with Ramnaresh Sarwan (90) for the third wicket, and 282 with Ridley Jacobs (107*) for the fifth wicket, on the way to a West Indies total of 751 for 5 declared. England's attack was hampered towards the end of the innings by the loss of Hoggard (stomach bug) and Harmison (barred from bowling after too many warnings for running on the pitch), although they had bowled 18 and 35 overs respectively. Despite a century for Andrew Flintoff (102*), England were bowled out for 285 in their first innings and forced to follow on. However, England managed to hold out in their second innings, with a century for Michael Vaughan (140), and the match was drawn.
20. Batting second, Gayle shared stands of 341 with Ramnaresh Sarwan (127) for the second wicket and 149 with Shivnarine Chanderpaul (also 127) for the fourth wicket, on the way to a West Indies total of 747; Dwayne Bravo (107) also scored a century. South Africa had batted first, scoring 588, with four batsmen scoring centuries (Abraham de Villiers (114), Graeme Smith (126), Jacques Kallis (147) and Ashwell Prince (131)) making a record eight centuries in the Test. The match was drawn.
21. Batting second, coming in to bat at 14 for 2, Jayawardene shared a partnership of 624 with Kumar Sangakkara (287) for the third wicket, a record for any wicket in first-class cricket. It eclipsed the previous Test partnership record, also held by two Sri Lankans. The Sri Lankan captain also shared a stand of 117 with Tillakaratne Dilshan (45). Sri Lanka declared on the fall of Jayawardene's wicket, at 756 for 5, a first-innings lead of 587. Sri Lanka won by an innings and 153 runs.
22. Batting second, Sehwag shared stands of 213 with Wasim Jaffer (74) for the first wicket and 268 with Rahul Dravid (111) for the second wicket on the way to an India total of 627. Sehwag reached his second triple-ton off only 278 balls, the fastest triple century in Test cricket, and his innings lasted 304 balls in total. The match ended in a draw.
23. The first ever Test triple hundred to be made against Sri Lanka, with the previous highest being Martin Crowe's 299. Khan brought up the milestone with a reverse sweep. After Sri Lanka had declared their first innings on 644 for 7, with captain Mahela Jayawardene and Thilan Samaraweera hitting for 240 and 231 respectively and teaming for a record fourth-wicket partnership of 437, Pakistan's captain led his team to a response of 765 for 6. The match was ultimately drawn. It was also the first Test in history in which both captains scored double centuries, and only the second in which three double centuries were scored.
24. Batting first, Gayle shared stands of 110 for the first wicket with Adrian Barath (50), 196 for the second wicket with Darren Bravo (58) and 167 for the fourth wicket with Brendan Nash before being bowled by Ajantha Mendis with the score at 566 for 6. The West Indies later declared at 580 for 9. The match was drawn.
25. Batting first, Clarke shared a stand of 288 with Ricky Ponting (134) for the fourth wicket, and an unbroken stand of 334 with Michael Hussey (150*) for the fifth wicket, on the way to an Australian total of 659 for 4 declared. Australia won the match by an innings and 68 runs, with the Australian captain also taking two catches in India's first innings, and one wicket in the second. This is the highest score at the SCG, surpassing Tip Foster's 287 in 1903.
26. Batting second, Amla shared a stand of 259 with Graeme Smith (131) and an unbroken partnership of 377 with Jacques Kallis (182*). He was left unbeaten on 311 when South Africa declared on 637 for 2. It was the first triple century by a South African cricketer. South Africa won by an innings and 12 runs.
27. Batting first, Sangakkara shared stands of 178 with Mahela Jayawardene (72) for the third wicket and 100 with Ajantha Mendis (47) for the eighth wicket. Sangakkara was last out, with Sri Lanka making 587. It is second Test triple hundred reached with a six. Sangakkara also scored a century (105) in the second innings, the second player to achieve the feat of a triple century and a century in the same Test. The match was drawn.
28. McCullum shared a record stand of 352 with BJ Watling (124) for the sixth wicket and 179 with James Neesham (137*) for the seventh wicket. New Zealand were 246 runs behind after the first innings, and finished their second innings on 680 for 8 declared. The captain's triple century was the first by a New Zealander, and only the second to be scored in a team's second innings. The match was drawn.
29. Azhar Ali became the first batsman to score a triple century in a day/night test match as well a first in a match to be played with a pink ball. Azhar played against West Indies in Dubai and began his innings on the first day of the 1st Test match. He hit 23 fours and two sixes in his marathon 469-ball 302 not out. He shared a 215-run opening stand with Sami Aslam. Pakistan declared the innings on 579 for the loss of only three batsmen while Azhar and Misbah remained unbeaten at the crease. Pakistan won by 56 runs.
30. Karun Nair became the second Indian batsman to score a triple century, the first being Virender Sehwag. Nair also became the first Indian and the third batsman overall to convert a maiden test century into a triple hundred. Nair played against England in Chennai and shared a stand of 161 with K. L. Rahul (199) for the fourth wicket, 181 with Ravichandran Ashwin (67) for the sixth wicket, and 138 with Ravindra Jadeja (51) for the seventh wicket on the way to a total of 759 for 7 declared. India won by an innings and 75 runs.
31. David Warner became the first batsman to score a triple century at Adelaide Oval in South Australia. He was the seventh Australian batsman to score a triple century, and the fourth to do so at an Australian ground. This score saw Warner surpass Sir Donald Bradman (334) and Mark Taylor (334*) to hold the second highest Test score by an Australian batsman, behind only Matthew Hayden. The Australian captain, Tim Paine, declared at 3/589 once Warner reached this mark.

== See also ==
- List of first-class cricket quadruple centuries
- List of One Day International cricket double centuries
- List of Ranji Trophy triple centuries

== Sources ==
- Wisden Cricketers' Almanack
- Most Runs in an Innings (from Cricinfo)
- Triple-centurions in Test cricket (from rediff.com)
