= Australian cricket team in Pakistan in 1988–89 =

International cricket tour

The Australian cricket team toured Pakistan in the 1988–89 season. The teams played three Tests and 3 ODI's. Pakistan won both series 1 - 0. Javed Miandad and Bruce Reid were declared Man of the Series.

== Summary ==
The first test was held in Karachi and quickly caused controversy, with Australian spinner Tim May having three LBW appeals turned down against Javed Miandad on the first day on his way to 211 and a first innings score of 9/469d, before Australia would suffer an innings defeat after collapsing to 165 in the first innings and 116 in the second after Pakistan enforced the follow on.

There was furore in the Australian camp as they perceived the umpiring to be biased towards Pakistan, this was not the first time umpiring standards had been questioned as the English team had also complained on their own tour the year previous and Imran Khan who did not play in this series, had called for neutral umpires for a tour of Pakistan in 1986 as there had been continued arguments that the Pakistani umpires were biased, a vote amongst the Australian team was held on if to continue the tour, with only Tony Dodemaide and Jamie Siddons voting to continue.

Although intervention from the Australian board ensured the tour would continue under protest. This protest would later be removed as the tour continued. The remaining matches were played out with Pakistan winning the test and ODI series 1-0 each. Pakistan would tour Australia the following year and there would also be questions about the umpiring, this time being biased towards Australia. Giving further strength to the idea of neutral umpires, which would be implemented by the ICC for all test matches from 1994.

== Australian squad ==
The Australian squad selected was as follows:

- Batsmen - David Boon, Allan Border (c), Dean Jones, Geoff Marsh, Jamie Siddons, Mike Veletta, Steve Waugh, Graeme Wood
- Fast/medium bowlers - Tony Dodemaide, Craig McDermott, Bruce Reid
- Wicketkeeper - Ian Healy
- Spinners - Tim May, Peter Sleep, Peter Taylor

== Test series ==
=== 1st Test ===
15–20 September 1988
(5-day match)
Scorecard

Pakistan	v	Australia
469/9d (169.5 overs); Javed Miandad 211 (441); TBA May 4/97 (40.5 overs)		165 (122 overs); PL Taylor 54* (251); Iqbal Qasim 5/35 (39 overs)
		116 (f/o) (64.4 overs); IA Healy 21 (34); Iqbal Qasim 4/49 (25 overs)

Pakistan won by an innings and 188 runs
National Stadium, Karachi
Umpires: Khizer Hayat and Mahboob Shah
Player of the match: Javed Miandad (PAK)

- Pakistan won the toss and elected to bat.
- 18 September was taken as a rest day.
- IA Healy (AUS) made his Test debut.

In the first Test, Javed Miandad scored 211, while Iqbal Qasim took 9 wickets.

=== 2nd Test ===
23–28 September 1988
(5-day match)
Scorecard

Pakistan	v	Australia
316 (106.5 overs); Ijaz Ahmed 122 (221); AIC Dodemaide 4/87 (34 overs)		321 (129.5 overs); AR Border 113* (237); Tauseef Ahmed 3/73 (35 overs)
378/9d (116.4 overs); Javed Miandad 107 (186); BA Reid 4/100 (30 overs)		67/3 (26 overs); DM Jones 21* (56); Shoaib Mohammad 1/2 (1 over)

Match drawn
Iqbal Stadium, Faisalabad
Umpires: Mahboob Shah and Tariq Ata
Player of the match: AR Border (AUS)
Ijaz Ahmed (PAK)

- Pakistan won the toss and elected to bat.
- 26 September was taken as a rest day.

In the second Test, Ijaz Ahmed and Javed Miandad scored 122 and 107 for Pakistan, while Allan Border scored 113 for Australia.

=== 3rd Test ===
7–11 October 1988
(5-day match)
Scorecard

Australia	v	Pakistan
340 (158 overs); AR Border 75 (193); Tauseef Ahmed 3/85 (50 overs)		233 (98.2 overs); Rameez Raja 64 (120); BA Reid 3/53 (23 overs)
161/3d (41 overs); GR Marsh 84* (136); Saleem Jaffar 2/60 (14 overs)		153/8 (84 overs); Mudassar Nazar 49 (190); PL Taylor 4/78 (28 overs)

Match drawn
Gaddafi Stadium, Lahore
Umpires: Khizer Hayat and Saleem Badar
Player of the match: GR Marsh (AUS)

- Australia won the toss and elected to bat.

In the third match, Javed Miandad became the first batsman for Pakistan to score 7,000 runs in Tests. It was also the only time that Steve Waugh opened the bowling in each innings in a Test.

== ODI series ==
Pakistan won the ODI series 1–0. The first match, scheduled for 30 September 1988, at the Jinnah Stadium in Gujranwala was abandoned due to the ground flooding. The second match, originally scheduled to be played at the National Stadium in Karachi on 14 October 1988, and the third one-day match, scheduled to be played at Niaz Stadium in Hyderabad on 15 October 1988, were both abandoned as well due to riots. As a result, the scheduled rest day of the Lahore Test was cancelled and a one-day international scheduled for 13 October for Gaddafi Stadium in Lahore. That match as then played a day later.

14 October 1988
Scorecard

Australia; 229/8 (45 overs)	v	Pakistan; 229/7 (45 overs)
GR Marsh 89 (126); Wasim Akram 3/38 (9 overs)		Mudassar Nazar 76* (108); TBA May 1/31 (9 overs)

Pakistan won by losing fewer wickets
Gaddafi Stadium, Lahore
Umpires: Ikram Rabbani and Mian Mohammad Aslam
Player of the match: Mudassar Nazar (PAK)

- Pakistan won the toss and elected to field.
- IA Healy and JD Siddons (both AUS) made their ODI debuts.

The only one day match to be played resulted in a tied game, with both teams scoring 229 in the 45 over match. However, since Australia lost 1 more wickets (8 to 7), Pakistan was declared winners of the match.

For more information regarding the riots, see Hyderabad riots of 1988

== Tour Matches ==
Australia also played three 3-day first class tour matches against BCCP Patron's XI at the Gaddafi Stadium in Lahore on 5 September 1988, Baluchistan Governor's XI at the Ayub National Stadium in Quetta on 9 September 1988 and against North West Frontier Province Governor's XI at the Arbab Niaz Stadium in Peshawar on 2 October 1988.

All three matches were drawn.

== External sources ==
Cricinfo CricketArchive
