= Pakistani cricket team in Australia in 2023–24 =

International cricket tour

Pakistan cricket team in Australia in 2023–24
	Australia	Pakistan
- Dates: 6 December 2023 – 7 January 2024
Captains	Pat Cummins	Shan Masood

Test series
- Result: Australia won the 3-match series 3–0
Most runs	Mitchell Marsh (344)	Mohammad Rizwan (193)
Most wickets	Pat Cummins (19)	Aamir Jamal (18)
- Player of the series: Pat Cummins (Aus)

The Pakistan national cricket team toured Australia in December 2023 and January 2024 to play three Test matches. The teams contested the Benaud–Qadir Trophy and the series was a part of the 2023–2025 ICC World Test Championship.

== Controversies ==
In December 2023, Australian cricketer Usman Khawaja apparently attempted to appeal to the international community by including the slogan "All lives are equal" in his pair of shoes during Australia's first test match of the series. He made the decision to showcase the solidarity with the citizens of Palestine who are being killed by Israeli forces although he did not intend any political messages directing towards a particular party. His social messages "All lives are equal" and "Freedom is a human right" were understood by both Cricket Australia (CA) and International Cricket Council (ICC) to be political and both organizations banned Khawaja from using such slogans. Khawaja also wore black armbands during the first test match against Pakistan at Perth which drew sharp criticism from the ICC which eventually reprimanded him for wearing black armbands by ruling out that it breached the clothing and equipment regulations of the body. Khawaja insisted that he wore black armband for his personal bereavement and does not lean with the sentiments towards Gaza. Khawaja also revealed that he would challenge the ICC charges regarding the wearing of black armbands but promised that he would not wear them for the Boxing Day test match at Melbourne against Pakistan.

In December 2023, Pakistani fast bowler Haris Rauf made himself unavailable for this series, due to his partaking in the Big Bash League, which triggered the PCB to hold a hearing. The hearing resulted in the termination of his central contract. PCB also decided for Rauf to not be granted an NOC to play in overseas leagues till June 30, 2024. During this time, the PCB chairman was Zaka Ashraf.

However, it is worth noting that Mohsin Naqvi did reinstate his central contract once according to Naqvi, "wrote to us (the PCB) very nicely."

== Squads ==
Australia	Pakistan
Pat Cummins (c); Travis Head (vc); Steve Smith (vc); Scott Boland; Alex Carey (wk); Cameron Green; Josh Hazlewood; Usman Khawaja; Marnus Labuschagne; Nathan Lyon; Mitchell Marsh; Lance Morris; Mitchell Starc; David Warner	Shan Masood (c); Shaheen Afridi (vc); Salman Ali Agha; Abrar Ahmed; Sarfaraz Ahmed (wk); Hasan Ali; Noman Ali; Faheem Ashraf; Saim Ayub; Babar Azam; Mir Hamza; Imam-ul-Haq; Aamir Jamal; Sajid Khan; Mohammad Rizwan (wk); Mohammad Nawaz; Abdullah Shafique; Khurram Shahzad; Saud Shakeel; Mohammad Wasim Jr.

On 10 December 2023, Sajid Khan was added to Pakistan's squad as cover for unfit Abrar Ahmed.

On 13 December 2023, Travis Head and Steve Smith were named joint-vice-captains of Australia.

On 21 December 2023, Pakistan's Khurram Shahzad was ruled out of the last two tests due to rib stress fracture and abdominal muscle tear suffered during the first Test.

On 23 December 2023, Pakistan's Noman Ali was ruled out of the last two tests due to acute appendicitis, with Mohammad Nawaz named as replacement.

== Tour matches ==
=== Prime Minister's XI vs Pakistan ===
6–9 December 2023
Scorecard

Pakistan	v	(Australia) Prime Minister's XI
9/391d (116.2 overs); Shan Masood 201* (298); Jordan Buckingham 5/80 (23 overs)		4/367 (141 overs); Matt Renshaw 136* (337); Imam-ul-Haq 1/12 (9 overs)

Match drawn
Manuka Oval, Canberra
Umpires: Phillip Gillespie (Aus) and Donovan Koch (Aus)
Player of the match: Shan Masood (Pak)

- Pakistan won the toss and elected to bat.
- No play was possible on day 4 due to rain.

=== Victoria XI vs Pakistan ===
This match wasn't part of the original schedule and was added later at Pakistan's request. It was not a first-class match.

22–23 December 2023
Scorecard

Pakistan	v	Victoria XI
323 (78.4 overs); Saud Shakeel 70 (87); Doug Warren 3/69 (15 overs)		4/272d (59 overs); Marcus Harris 126 (131); Shaheen Afridi 1/37 (8 overs)
3/57 (11.3 overs); Abdullah Shafique 39 (44); Sam Elliott 1/6 (2 overs)

Match drawn
Junction Oval, Melbourne
Umpires: Gaurav Bawa (Aus) and Shawn Craig (Aus)

- Pakistan won the toss and elected to bat.

== Test series ==
=== 1st Test ===
14–17 December 2023
Scorecard

Australia	v	Pakistan
487 (113.2 overs); David Warner 164 (211); Aamir Jamal 6/111 (20.2 overs)		271 (101.5 overs); Imam-ul-Haq 62 (199); Nathan Lyon 3/66 (24 overs)
5/233d (63.2 overs); Usman Khawaja 90 (190); Khurram Shahzad 3/45 (16 overs)		89 (30.2 overs); Saud Shakeel 24 (51); Josh Hazlewood 3/13 (7.2 overs)

Australia won by 360 runs
Perth Stadium, Perth
Umpires: Richard Illingworth (Eng) and Joel Wilson (WI)
Player of the match: Mitchell Marsh (Aus)

- Australia won the toss and elected to bat.
- Aamir Jamal and Khurram Shahzad (Pak) both made their Test debuts.
- Shan Masood captained Pakistan for the first time in Tests.
- Babar Azam (Pak) played in his 50th Test.
- Aamir Jamal became the 14th bowler for Pakistan to take a five-wicket haul on Test debut.
- Nathan Lyon (Aus) became the 3rd Australian and 8th overall to take 500 wickets in Tests.
- World Test Championship points: Australia 12, Pakistan –2.

=== 2nd Test ===
26–29 December 2023
Scorecard

Australia	v	Pakistan
318 (96.5 overs); Marnus Labuschagne 63 (155); Aamir Jamal 3/64 (19 overs)		264 (73.5 overs); Abdullah Shafique 62 (109); Pat Cummins 5/48 (20 overs)
262 (84.1 overs); Mitchell Marsh 96 (130); Mir Hamza 4/32 (18.1 overs)		237 (67.2 overs); Shan Masood 60 (71); Pat Cummins 5/49 (18 overs)

Australia won by 79 runs
Melbourne Cricket Ground, Melbourne
Umpires: Michael Gough (Eng) and Joel Wilson (WI)
Player of the match: Pat Cummins (Aus)

- Pakistan won the toss and elected to field.
- Pat Cummins (Aus) took his 250th wicket and his 10th 5-wicket haul in Tests.
- World Test Championship points: Australia 12, Pakistan 0.

=== 3rd Test ===
3–6 January 2024
Scorecard

Pakistan	v	Australia
313 (77.1 overs); Mohammad Rizwan 88 (103); Pat Cummins 5/61 (18 overs)		299 (109.4 overs); Marnus Labuschagne 60 (147); Aamir Jamal 6/69 (21.4 overs)
115 (43.1 overs); Saim Ayub 33 (53); Josh Hazlewood 4/16 (9 overs)		2/130 (25.5 overs); Marnus Labuschagne 62* (73); Sajid Khan 2/49 (11 overs)

Australia won by 8 wickets
Sydney Cricket Ground, Sydney
Umpires: Michael Gough (Eng) and Richard Illingworth (Eng)
Player of the match: Aamir Jamal (Pak)

- Pakistan won the toss and elected to bat.
- Saim Ayub (Pak) made his Test debut.
- David Warner (Aus) played in his last Test.
- World Test Championship points: Australia 12, Pakistan 0.
