= Australian cricket team in Pakistan in 2021–22 =

International cricket tour

	Pakistan	Australia
- Dates: 4 March – 5 April 2022
Captains	Babar Azam	Pat Cummins (Tests); Aaron Finch (ODIs & T20I)

Test series
- Result: Australia won the 3-match series 1–0
Most runs	Abdullah Shafique (397)	Usman Khawaja (496)
Most wickets	Shaheen Afridi (9); Nauman Ali (9)	Pat Cummins (12); Nathan Lyon (12)
- Player of the series: Usman Khawaja (Aus)

One Day International series
- Results: Pakistan won the 3-match series 2–1
Most runs	Imam-ul-Haq (298)	Ben McDermott (195)
Most wickets	Shaheen Afridi (6)	Adam Zampa (6)
- Player of the series: Babar Azam (Pak)

Twenty20 International series
- Results: Australia won the 1-match series 1–0
Most runs	Babar Azam (66)	Aaron Finch (55)
Most wickets	Shaheen Afridi (2); Usman Qadir (2); Mohammad Wasim (2)	Nathan Ellis (4)

The Australian cricket team toured Pakistan in March and April 2022 to play three Tests, three One Day Internationals (ODIs) and one Twenty20 International (T20I) match. The Test series formed part of the 2021–2023 ICC World Test Championship, and the ODI series formed part of the inaugural 2020–2023 ICC Cricket World Cup Super League. It was Australia's first tour to Pakistan since 1998. The Test series was the first time that the teams played for the Benaud–Qadir Trophy, named after former international cricketers Richie Benaud and Abdul Qadir.

The first Test ended in a draw, with the teams shaking hands before the scheduled close of play on day five. Across the match, Pakistan's aggregate score was 728 for 4, with Australia's Steve Smith saying that the wicket was "dead" and benign". The pitch was later rated as "below average" by match referee Ranjan Madugalle. The second Test also finished in a draw on the fifth day, after Australia had declared on 556/9 in their first innings, with Pakistan's Babar Azam scoring 196 runs in the fourth innings. Australia won the third Test by 115 runs in the final session of play on day five to win the series 1–0. It was Australia's first Test series win in Asia since 2011, and their first Test win in Asia since 2017.

Australia won the opening ODI match by 88 runs, after Travis Head scored a century. In the second match, Australia scored 348/8 from their 50 overs, with Ben McDermott scoring his first ODI century. In reply, Pakistan made 349/4 in 49 overs, with centuries from Imam-ul-Haq and Babar Azam, to record Pakistan's highest successful run chase in an ODI match. Pakistan won the third ODI by nine wickets to take the series 2–1, with Babar Azam scoring another century. It was Pakistan's first ODI series win against Australia since June 2002. Australia finished the tour by winning the one-off T20I match by three wickets.

The tour was deemed a success with former players from both teams praising the teams and requesting for more international cricket in Pakistan. Pakistan's Shahid Afridi said that "I hope other teams will follow their footsteps & visit Pakistan", with Shoaib Akhtar also saying that he was "glad the whole series with Australia went smooth". Australia's Shane Watson also said that the tour was a "great thing for world cricket".

== Background ==
In September 2021, Cricket Australia said they were monitoring the situation in Pakistan and will "talk with the relevant authorities once more information becomes known", after New Zealand cancelled their tour of Pakistan due to a security threat. In November 2021, the Pakistan Cricket Board (PCB) confirmed the fixtures for the tour. On 4 February 2022, the PCB made some minor changes to the tour schedule. The limited overs matches were moved from Lahore to Rawalpindi, and the venues of the first two Test matches were swapped around, with Cricket Australia endorsing the tour.

After initial fears that some Australian players may opt out of the tour, Australia named a full-strength Test squad on 8 February 2022. Originally, the Test matches would have overlapped with Australia's T20I tour of New Zealand. However, on 9 February 2022, that tour was abandoned after there were no managed isolation quarantine (MIQ) spots available for the Australian team. On 27 February 2022, the Australian team arrived in Pakistan, landing at Islamabad International Airport. On 18 March 2022, the limited overs matches were moved from Rawalpindi to Lahore, due to political tension in Islamabad.

== Squads ==
Tests		ODIs		T20I	
Pakistan	Australia	Pakistan	Australia	Pakistan	Australia
Babar Azam (c); Mohammad Rizwan (vc, wk); Shaheen Afridi; Iftikhar Ahmed; Fawad Alam; Azhar Ali; Hasan Ali; Nauman Ali; Faheem Ashraf; Imam-ul-Haq; Sajid Khan; Zahid Mahmood; Shan Masood; ~~Mohammad Nawaz~~; Haris Rauf; Abdullah Shafique; Naseem Shah; Saud Shakeel; Mohammad Wasim	Pat Cummins (c); Steve Smith (vc); Ashton Agar; Scott Boland; Alex Carey (wk); Cameron Green; Marcus Harris; Josh Hazlewood; Travis Head; Josh Inglis (wk); Usman Khawaja; Marnus Labuschagne; Nathan Lyon; Mitchell Marsh; ~~Michael Neser~~; Mark Steketee; Mitchell Starc; Mitchell Swepson; David Warner	Babar Azam (c); Shadab Khan (vc); Asif Afridi; Shaheen Afridi; Iftikhar Ahmed; Asif Ali; Haider Ali; Hasan Ali; Shahnawaz Dahani; Mohammad Haris (wk); Zahid Mahmood; ~~Mohammad Nawaz~~; Usman Qadir; Haris Rauf; Mohammad Rizwan (wk); Abdullah Shafique; Khushdil Shah; Saud Shakeel; Imam-ul-Haq; Mohammad Wasim; Fakhar Zaman	Aaron Finch (c); Sean Abbott; ~~Ashton Agar~~; Jason Behrendorff; Alex Carey (wk); Ben Dwarshuis; Nathan Ellis; Cameron Green; Travis Head; Josh Inglis; Marnus Labuschagne; ~~Mitchell Marsh~~; Ben McDermott; Matt Renshaw; ~~Kane Richardson~~; ~~Steve Smith~~; Mitchell Swepson; Marcus Stoinis; Adam Zampa	Babar Azam (c); Shadab Khan (vc); Asif Afridi; Shaheen Afridi; Iftikhar Ahmed; Asif Ali; Haider Ali; Hasan Ali; Shahnawaz Dahani; Mohammad Haris (wk); Zahid Mahmood; ~~Mohammad Nawaz~~; Usman Qadir; Haris Rauf; Mohammad Rizwan (wk); Khushdil Shah; Mohammad Wasim; Fakhar Zaman	Aaron Finch (c); Sean Abbott; Ashton Agar; Jason Behrendorff; Alex Carey (wk); Ben Dwarshuis; Nathan Ellis; Cameron Green; Travis Head; Josh Inglis; Marnus Labuschagne; ~~Mitchell Marsh~~; Ben McDermott; ~~Kane Richardson~~; ~~Steve Smith~~; Mitchell Swepson; Marcus Stoinis; Adam Zampa

Pakistan also named Kamran Ghulam, Mohammad Abbas, Naseem Shah, Sarfaraz Ahmed and Yasir Shah as reserve players for the Test series. Prior to the start of the Test series, Mohammad Nawaz was ruled out of Pakistan's squad with a foot injury. Mohammad Haris was also added to Pakistan's reserve list for the Test matches. Hasan Ali and Faheem Ashraf were both ruled out of Pakistan's squad for the first Test due to injuries, with Iftikhar Ahmed and Mohammad Wasim added to their squad. On 1 March 2022, Haris Rauf tested positive for COVID-19. As a result, travelling reserve Naseem Shah was added to Pakistan's squad for the first Test. Faheem Ashraf, who was ruled out of the first Test due to an injury, was also initially ruled out of the second Test after testing positive for COVID-19. However, less than 24 hours later, Faheem was given the go-ahead to join Pakistan's Test squad after clearing a rapid antigen test. On 20 March 2022, Zahid Mahmood replaced Mohammad Nawaz in Pakistan's ODI and T20I squads after not recovering from his foot injury. Zahid was also named as cover for Shadab Khan.

Ahead of the tour, Michael Neser was ruled out of the series and was replaced by Mark Steketee in the Australian Test team. Australia also named Sean Abbott and Brendan Doggett as standby players for the tour. Kane Richardson was ruled out of Australia's ODI and T20I squads due to a hamstring injury. Ben Dwarshuis was named as his replacement. Steve Smith was also ruled out of Australia's limited overs matches, due to an elbow problem, and was replaced by Mitchell Swepson. Mitchell Marsh was ruled out of Australia's squad for the first ODI due to a hip injury, before being ruled out of all of the white-ball matches. Ashton Agar was ruled out of Australia's squad for the ODI matches after testing positive for COVID-19 with Matt Renshaw named as his replacement.

== Test series ==
=== 1st Test ===
4–8 March 2022
Scorecard

Pakistan	v	Australia
476/4d (162 overs); Azhar Ali 185 (361); Marnus Labuschagne 1/53 (12 overs)		459 (140.1 overs); Usman Khawaja 97 (159); Nauman Ali 6/107 (38.1 overs)
252/0 (77 overs); Abdullah Shafique 136* (242)

Match drawn
Rawalpindi Cricket Stadium, Rawalpindi
Umpires: Aleem Dar (Pak) and Ahsan Raza (Pak)
Player of the match: Imam-ul-Haq (Pak)

- Pakistan won the toss and elected to bat.
- 21 overs were lost on day 3 due to bad light and rain. No play was possible before lunch on day 4 due to a wet outfield.
- Imam-ul-Haq (Pak) scored his first century in Tests, and became the tenth batter for Pakistan to score a century in both innings of a Test.
- Abdullah Shafique (Pak) scored his first century in Tests.
- World Test Championship points: Pakistan 4, Australia 4.

=== 2nd Test ===
12–16 March 2022
Scorecard

Australia	v	Pakistan
556/9d (189 overs); Usman Khawaja 160 (369); Faheem Ashraf 2/55 (21 overs)		148 (53 overs); Babar Azam 36 (79); Mitchell Starc 3/29 (13 overs)
97/2d (22.3 overs); Usman Khawaja 44* (70); Shaheen Afridi 1/21 (6.3 overs)		443/7 (171.4 overs); Babar Azam 196 (425); Nathan Lyon 4/112 (55 overs)

Match drawn
National Stadium, Karachi
Umpires: Aleem Dar (Pak) and Ahsan Raza (Pak)
Player of the match: Babar Azam (Pak)

- Australia won the toss and elected to bat.
- Mitchell Swepson (Aus) made his Test debut and returned the worst figures for an Australian in a Test match with 0/156.
- Babar Azam (Pak) scored the highest total by a captain in the fourth innings of a Test.
- World Test Championship points: Pakistan 4, Australia 4.

=== 3rd Test ===
21–25 March 2022
Scorecard

Australia	v	Pakistan
391 (133.3 overs); Usman Khawaja 91 (219); Naseem Shah 4/58 (31 overs)		268 (116.4 overs); Abdullah Shafique 81 (228); Pat Cummins 5/56 (24 overs)
227/3d (60 overs); Usman Khawaja 104* (178); Naseem Shah 1/23 (12 overs)		235 (92.1 overs); Imam-ul-Haq 70 (199); Nathan Lyon 5/83 (37 overs)

Australia won by 115 runs
Gaddafi Stadium, Lahore
Umpires: Aleem Dar (Pak) and Ahsan Raza (Pak)
Player of the match: Pat Cummins (Aus)

- Australia won the toss and elected to bat.
- Azhar Ali (Pak) scored his 7,000th run in Tests.
- Steve Smith (Aus) became the fastest cricketer, in terms of innings, to score 8,000 runs in Tests (151).
- World Test Championship points: Australia 12, Pakistan 0.

== ODI series ==
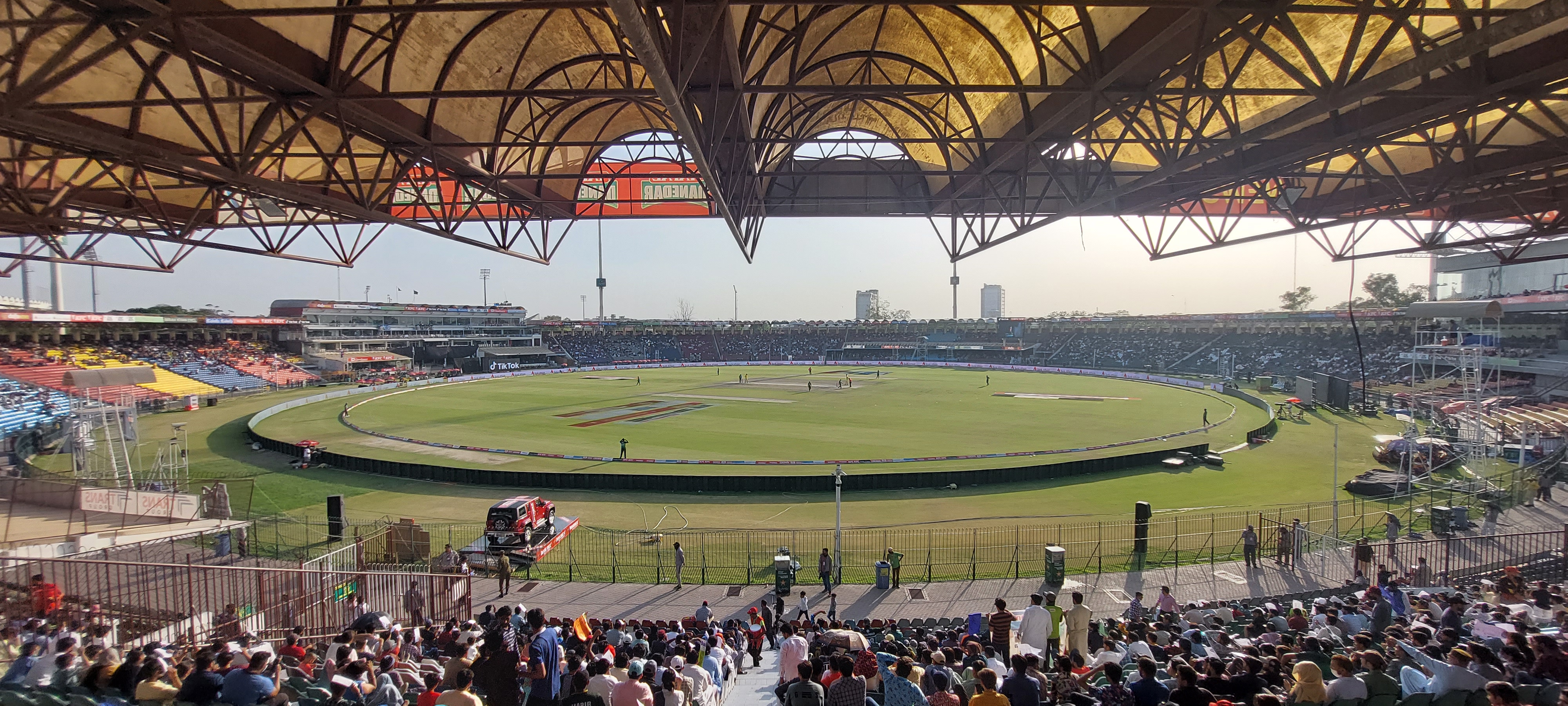
The 3rd ODI between Pakistan and Australia at the Gaddafi Stadium, Lahore (2022)

=== 1st ODI ===
29 March 2022
15:00 (D/N)
Scorecard

Australia; 313/7 (50 overs)	v	Pakistan; 225 (45.2 overs)
Travis Head 101 (72); Haris Rauf 2/44 (8 overs)		Imam-ul-Haq 103 (96); Adam Zampa 4/38 (10 overs)

Australia won by 88 runs
Gaddafi Stadium, Lahore
Umpires: Aleem Dar (Pak) and Asif Yaqoob (Pak)
Player of the match: Travis Head (Aus)

- Pakistan won the toss and elected to field.
- Zahid Mahmood, Mohammad Wasim (Pak), Nathan Ellis and Mitchell Swepson (Aus) all made their ODI debuts.
- Babar Azam (Pak) scored his 4,000th run in ODIs.
- Adam Zampa (Aus) took his 100th wicket in ODIs.
- World Cup Super League points: Australia 10, Pakistan 0.

=== 2nd ODI ===
31 March 2022
15:00 (D/N)
Scorecard

Australia; 348/8 (50 overs)	v	Pakistan; 349/4 (49 overs)
Ben McDermott 104 (108); Shaheen Afridi 4/63 (10 overs)		Babar Azam 114 (83); Adam Zampa 2/71 (10 overs)

Pakistan won by 6 wickets
Gaddafi Stadium, Lahore
Umpires: Aleem Dar (Pak) and Ahsan Raza (Pak)
Player of the match: Babar Azam (Pak)

- Pakistan won the toss and elected to field.
- Ben McDermott (Aus) scored his first century in ODIs.
- This was Pakistan's highest successful run chase in ODIs.
- World Cup Super League points: Pakistan 10, Australia 0.

=== 3rd ODI ===
2 April 2022
15:00 (D/N)
Scorecard

Australia; 210 (41.5 overs)	v	Pakistan; 214/1 (37.5 overs)
Alex Carey 56 (61); Haris Rauf 3/39 (8.5 overs)		Babar Azam 105* (115); Nathan Ellis 1/38 (6 overs)

Pakistan won by 9 wickets
Gaddafi Stadium, Lahore
Umpires: Aleem Dar (Pak) and Rashid Riaz (Pak)
Player of the match: Babar Azam (Pak)

- Pakistan won the toss and elected to field.
- World Cup Super League points: Pakistan 10, Australia 0.

== Only T20I ==
5 April 2022
20:30 (N)
Scorecard

Pakistan; 162/8 (20 overs)	v	Australia; 163/7 (19.1 overs)
Babar Azam 66 (46); Nathan Ellis 4/28 (4 overs)		Aaron Finch 55 (45); Shaheen Afridi 2/21 (4 overs)

Australia won by 3 wickets
Gaddafi Stadium, Lahore
Umpires: Aleem Dar (Pak) and Ahsan Raza (Pak)
Player of the match: Aaron Finch (Aus)

- Australia won the toss and elected to field.
- Ben Dwarshuis, Cameron Green and Marnus Labuschagne (Aus) all made their T20I debuts.

== In popular culture ==
The second season of the Australian docu-series - The Test was produced, following the Australian national cricket team in the aftermath of the resignation of Tim Paine as Test captain. The third episode of Season 2 featured Australia playing the three tests against Pakistan.
