= Australian cricket team in New Zealand in 2021–22 =

International cricket tour

	New Zealand	Australia
- Dates: 17 – 20 March 2022

Twenty20 International series

The Australia cricket team was scheduled to tour New Zealand in March 2022 to play three Twenty20 International (T20I) matches. The series would have overlapped with Australia's Test matches in Pakistan.

The initial tour schedule had the first two T20Is at the Wellington Regional Stadium. On 27 January 2022, New Zealand Cricket announced a change to the itinerary, with all matches being moved to McLean Park. However, on 9 February 2022, the tour was abandoned after there were no managed isolation quarantine (MIQ) spots available for the Australian team.

== T20I series ==
=== 1st T20I ===
17 March 2022
19:10 (N)
Scorecard

Australia	v	New Zealand

McLean Park, Napier

=== 2nd T20I ===
18 March 2022
19:10 (N)
Scorecard

Australia	v	New Zealand

McLean Park, Napier

=== 3rd T20I ===
20 March 2022
19:10 (N)
Scorecard

Australia	v	New Zealand

McLean Park, Napier
