= Pakistani cricket team in Australia in 1989–90 =

International cricket tour

Pakistan cricket team in Australia in 1989–90
- Date: December 1989 – March 1990
- Location: Australia
- Result: Australia won the 3-Test series 1–0
- Player of the series: Wasim Akram
Teams
- Australia: Pakistan
Captains
- Allan Border: Imran Khan
Most runs
- MA Taylor (390) DM Jones (247): Imran Khan (311); Wasim Akram (197); Javed Miandad (190)
Most wickets
- MG Hughes (16) TM Alderman (13): Wasim Akram (17)

The Pakistan national cricket team toured Australia in the 1989–90 season, under the captaincy of Imran Khan. The series set a Pakistani team, regarded as one of the strongest team in the world against an Australian team returning from an unexpectedly successful tour of England. The series was marred by a series of incidents and conflicts, including a walk off by the Pakistani players during a tour match against Victoria in protest at an umpire's ruling. The three match Test series was won by Australia 1–0.

The touring party consisted of Imran Khan (captain), Aamer Malik, Aaqib Javed, Abdul Qadir, Ijaz Ahmed, Javed Miandad, Mansoor Akhtar, Maqsood Rana, Mushtaq Ahmed, Nadeem Ghauri, Rameez Raja, Saeed Anwar, Saleem Malik, Saleem Yousuf, Shoaib Mohammad, Tauseef Ahmed, Waqar Younis and Wasim Akram.

== Results ==
Pakistan played 17 games during their tour, losing nine and winning five with three draws. Six of these were first class cricket matches and Pakistan went without a win - including the three Test matches which saw one defeat to Australia and two draws.

=== 1st Test ===
12–16 January
Scorecard

Australia	v	Pakistan
223 (90.1 overs); MA Taylor 52 (144); Wasim Akram 6/62 (30 overs)		107 (65.5 overs); Ijaz Ahmed 19 (33); TM Alderman 3/30 (19 overs)
8/312 (dec) (108.4 overs); MA Taylor 101 (240); Wasim Akram 5/98 (41.4 overs)		336 (137.5 overs); Ijaz Ahmed 121 (331); TM Alderman 5/105 (33.5 overs)

Australia won by 92 runs
Melbourne Cricket Ground, Melbourne
Umpires: PJ McConnell (Aus) and RJ Evans (Aus)
Player of the match: Wasim Akram (Pak)

=== 2nd Test ===
19–23 January
Scorecard

Pakistan	v	Australia
257 (76.3 overs); Wasim Akram 52 (68); CG Rackemann 4/40 (21 overs)		341 (133 overs); DM Jones 116 (239); Wasim Akram 5/100 (43 overs)
9/387 (dec) (143.5 overs); Imran Khan 136 (361); Merv Hughes 5/111 (32 overs)		6/233 (83 overs); DM Jones 121 (205); Tauseef Ahmed 3/80 (32 overs)

Match drawn
Adelaide Oval, Adelaide
Umpires: AR Crafter (Aus) and LJ King (Aus)
Player of the match: Wasim Akram (Pak)

=== 3rd Test ===
3–8 February
Scorecard

Pakistan	v	Australia
199 (94.5 overs); Imran Khan 82 (203); TM Alderman 5/65 (33.5 overs)		2/176 (65 overs); MA Taylor 101 (227); Waqar Younis 1/21 (9 overs)

Match drawn
Sydney Cricket Ground, Sydney
Umpires: AR Crafter (Aus) and PJ McConnell (Aus)
Player of the match: MA Taylor (Aus)

- The match was extended by one day after 3, 4 and 6 February were washed out.

== Other matches ==
Pakistan also competed in a tri-nation ODI tournament involving Australia and Sri Lanka they won 5 of their 8-round robin matches. In the best of three final with Australia, they lost 2–0.

== External sources ==
- Australia v Pakistan, 1989-1990
- CricketArchive
