= Pakistani cricket team in Australia in 1995–96 =

International cricket tour

The Pakistan national cricket team toured Australia in the 1995–96 season and played 3 Test matches against Australia. Australia won the series 2-1.

== Test series summary ==
=== 1st Test ===
9–13 November 1995
(5-day match)
Scorecard

Australia	v	Pakistan
463 (161.5 overs); SR Waugh 112* (275); Waqar Younis 3/101 (29.5 overs)		97 (41.1 overs); Aamer Sohail 32 (66); SK Warne 7/23 (16.1 overs)
		240 (f/o) (85.5 overs); Aamer Sohail 99 (159); SK Warne 4/54 (27.5 overs)

Australia won by an innings and 126 runs
Brisbane Cricket Ground, Woolloongabba, Brisbane
Umpires: KE Liebenberg (SA) and SG Randell (AUS)
Player of the match: SK Warne (AUS)

- Australia won the toss and elected to bat.
- 12 November was taken as a rest day.
- The match was scheduled for five days but completed in four.
- Saleem Elahi (PAK) made his Test debut.

=== 2nd Test ===
17–20 November 1995
(5-day match)
Scorecard

Australia	v	Pakistan
267 (78.3 overs); ME Waugh 88 (151); Mushtaq Ahmed 5/115 (30 overs)		198 (66.5 overs); Rameez Raja 59 (115); PR Reiffel 4/38 (15.5 overs)
306 (102.1 overs); MA Taylor 123 (244); Mushtaq Ahmed 4/83 (38 overs)		220 (84.3 overs); Aamer Sohail 57 (110); GD McGrath 5/61 (24.3 overs)

Australia won by 155 runs
Bellerive Oval, Hobart
Umpires: HD Bird (ENG) and DB Hair (AUS)
Player of the match: MA Taylor (AUS)

- Australia won the toss and elected to bat.
- The match was scheduled for five days but completed in four.

=== 3rd Test ===
30 November–4 December 1995
(5-day match)
Scorecard

Pakistan	v	Australia
299 (113.2 overs); Ijaz Ahmed 137 (332); SK Warne 4/55 (34 overs)		257 (98.2 overs); ME Waugh 116 (206); Mushtaq Ahmed 5/95 (36.2 overs)
204 (94 overs); Inzamam-ul-Haq 59 (135); CJ McDermott 5/49 (15.3 overs)		172 (66.1 overs); MA Taylor 59 (154); Mushtaq Ahmed 4/91 (30 overs)

Pakistan won by 74 runs
Sydney Cricket Ground, Sydney
Umpires: HD Bird (ENG) and SG Randell (AUS)
Player of the match: Mushtaq Ahmed (PAK)

- Pakistan won the toss and elected to bat.

== External sources ==
- CricketArchive
- Cricinfo
