= Pakistani cricket team in Australia in 1999–2000 =

	Pakistan	Australia
- Dates: 26 October 1999 – 12 January 2000
Captains	Wasim Akram	Steve Waugh

Test series
- Result: Australia won the 3-match series 3–0
Most runs	Saeed Anwar (282)	Justin Langer (331)
Most wickets	Saqlain Mushtaq (10)	Damien Fleming (18)

The Pakistan national cricket team toured Australia in the 1999–2000 season to play three test matches against Australia before the tri-series with India. The tour began on October 26, in, Perth, Western Australia against an ACB Chairman XI as they played in four tour matches (two list a and two first-class matches before the first test which was played at the Brisbane Cricket Ground. The captains of the teams were Wasim Akram for Pakistan, and Steve Waugh for Australia.

In the opening test played in Brisbane, centuries from Michael Slater and Mark Waugh guided Australia to a ten wicket victory. The following test, played at Hobart saw Pakistan with a century from Inzamam-ul-Haq and a six wicket haul in the first innings from Saqlain Mushtaq give Australia a target of 369 runs to chase down. In what was a record breaking run-chase, centuries from Justin Langer and Adam Gilchrist aided Australia to a four wicket win and also taking the series with one game to spare. The final test which was played at Perth saw a 337-run partnership between Ricky Ponting and Justin Langer as they led Australia to 451 which would be enough as they won by an innings and twenty runs.

Australian batsman, Justin Langer top scored for the series with 331 runs which included two centuries as he finished ahead of Michael Slater and Pakistani batsman, Saeed Anwar. In the bowling, Damien Fleming was the leading wicket taker of the series with 18 wickets which included a five wicket inning in Brisbane. He was followed by fellow Australian bowlers, Glenn McGrath and Shane Warne.

== Test series ==
=== 1st Test ===
5–9 November 1999
Scorecard

Pakistan	v	Australia
367 (117.1 overs); Inzamam-ul-Haq 88 (199); Damien Fleming 4/65 (31 overs)		575 (139.1 overs); Michael Slater 169 (271); Shoaib Akhtar 4/153 (32 overs)
281 (74.1 overs); Saeed Anwar 119 (174); Damien Fleming 5/59 (14.1 overs)		0/74 (14.2 overs); Greg Blewett 40* (48)

Australia won by 10 wickets
Brisbane Cricket Ground, Woolloongabba, Brisbane
Umpires: Daryl Harper (Aus) and Eddie Nicholls (WI)
Player of the match: Michael Slater (Australia)

- Australia won the toss and elected to field.
- Abdul Razzaq (Pak), Adam Gilchrist and Scott Muller (Aus) made their Test debut. Gilchrist made a half century off 46 balls, the fastest by an Australian on debut.

=== 2nd Test ===
18–22 November 1999
Scorecard

Pakistan	v	Australia
222 (72.5 overs); Mohammad Wasim 91 (122); Shane Warne 3/45 (16 overs)		246 (80 overs); Michael Slater 97 (195); Saqlain Mushtaq 6/46 (24 overs)
392 (128.5 overs); Inzamam-ul-Haq 118 (191); Shane Warne 5/110 (45.5 overs)		6/369 (113.5 overs); Adam Gilchrist 149* (163); Azhar Mahmood 2/43 (17 overs)

Australia won by 4 wickets
Bellerive Oval, Hobart
Umpires: Peter Parker (Aus) and Peter Willey (Eng)
Player of the match: Justin Langer (Australia)

- Australia won the toss and elected to field.
- Adam Gilchrist scored his maiden Test century

=== 3rd Test ===
26–28 November 1999
Scorecard

Pakistan	v	Australia
155 (52 overs); Azhar Mahmood 39 (65); Michael Kasprowicz 4/53 (12 overs)		451 (110.5 overs); Ricky Ponting 197 (288); Mohammad Akram 5/138 (27.5 overs)
276 (69.4 overs); Ijaz Ahmed 115 (160); Glenn McGrath 4/49 (21 overs)

Australia won by innings and 20 runs
WACA Ground, Perth
Umpires: Darrell Hair (Aus) and Peter Willey (Eng)
Player of the match: Ricky Ponting (Australia)

- Pakistan won the toss and elected to bat.

== External sources ==
- CricketArchive
