= Pakistani cricket team in Australia in 1981–82 =

International cricket tour

The Pakistan national cricket team toured Australia in the 1981–82 season and played 3 Test matches against Australia. Australia won the series 2-1.

== Test series summary ==
=== First Test ===
13–17 November 1981
(5-day match)
Scorecard

Australia	v	Pakistan
180 (83.4 overs); GM Wood 33 (87); Imran Khan 4/66 (31.4 overs)		62 (21.2 overs); Sarfraz Nawaz 26 (33); DK Lillee 5/18 (9 overs)
424/8d (138 overs); KJ Hughes 106 (198); Imran Khan 3/90 (39 overs)		256 (73.5 overs); Javed Miandad 79 (128); B Yardley 6/84 (25.5 overs)

Australia won by 286 runs
Western Australia Cricket Association Ground, Perth
Umpires: AR Crafter and MW Johnson
Player of the match: TM Alderman (AUS)

- Pakistan won the toss and elected to field.
- Rizwan-uz-Zaman (PAK) made his Test debut.

=== Second Test ===
27 November–1 December 1981
(5-day match)
Scorecard

Pakistan	v	Australia
291 (79 overs); Zaheer Abbas 80 (116); DK Lillee 5/81 (20 overs)		512/9d (152 overs); GS Chappell 201* (296); Imran Khan 4/92 (40 overs)
223 (73 overs); Mohsin Khan 43 (91); DK Lillee 4/51 (19 overs)		3/0 (2.2 overs); BM Laird 3* (8)

Australia won by 10 wickets
Brisbane Cricket Ground, Woolloongabba, Brisbane
Umpires: AR Crafter and MW Johnson
Player of the match: GS Chappell (AUS)

- Australia won the toss and elected to field.

=== Third Test ===
11–15 December 1981
(5-day match)
Scorecard

Pakistan	v	Australia
500/8d (171.3 overs); Mudassar Nazar 95 (202); B Yardley 7/187 (66 overs)		293 (134.1 overs); GM Wood 100 (305); Imran Khan 3/41 (24.1 overs)
		125 (f/o) (72.1 overs); BM Laird 52 (132); Iqbal Qasim 4/44 (24 overs)

Pakistan won by an innings and 82 runs
Melbourne Cricket Ground, Melbourne
Umpires: RC Bailhache and RA French
Player of the match: B Yardley (AUS)

- Pakistan won the toss and elected to bat.

== External sources ==
- CricketArchive – tour summaries

== Annual reviews ==
- Playfair Cricket Annual 1982
- Wisden Cricketers' Almanack 1982
