= Australian cricket team against Pakistan in Sri Lanka and the UAE in 2002–03 =

Australia's tour of Pakistan in 2002-03
	Pakistan	Australia
- Dates: October 3, 2002 – October 22, 2002
Captains	Waqar Younis	Steve Waugh

Test series
- Result: Australia won the 3-match series 3–0
Most runs	Faisal Iqbal (144)	Ricky Ponting (341)
Most wickets	Saqlain Mushtaq (14)	Shane Warne (27)
- Player of the series: Shane Warne (Aus)

The Australian national cricket team played 3 Tests series against Pakistan in October 2002. Originally scheduled to take place in Pakistan, but it was changed to a neutral venue after 2002 Karachi bus bombing. This was done in consultation with Foreign Minister Alexander Downer and Prime Minister John Howard.

The first test was played in Sri Lanka and the other two were played in the UAE. Australians won the series 3-0.

== Test series ==
=== 1st Test ===
3–7 October 2002
Scorecard

Australia	v	Pakistan
467 (116.5 overs); Ricky Ponting 141 (163); Saqlain Mushtaq 4/136 (40.5 overs)		279 (65.3 overs); Faisal Iqbal 83 (85); Shane Warne 7/94 (24.3 overs)
127 (39.5 overs); Matthew Hayden 34 (70); Shoaib Akhtar 5/21 (8 overs)		274 (94.2 overs); Taufeeq Umar 88 (172); Shane Warne 4/94 (30.3 overs)

Australia won by 41 runs
P Saravanamuttu Stadium, Colombo
Umpires: Steve Bucknor & Srinivas Venkataraghavan
Player of the match: Shane Warne (Aus)

- Australia won the toss & elected to bat

=== 2nd Test ===
11–12 October 2002
Scorecard

Pakistan	v	Australia
59 (31.5 overs); Abdul Razzaq 21 (62); Shane Warne 4/11 (11 overs)		310 (92.1 overs); Matthew Hayden 119 (255); Saqlain Mushtaq 4/83 (34 overs)
53 (24.5 overs); Imran Nazir 16 (48); Shane Warne 4/13 (6.5 overs)

Australia won by an innings and 198 runs
Sharjah Cricket Association Stadium
Umpires: Steve Bucknor & Srinivas Venkataraghavan
Player of the match: Matthew Hayden (Aus)

- Pakistan won the toss & elected to bat
- Pakistan's total of 53 surpassed their lowest total in Tests set in the first innings.
- This Test match was the 17th occasion a match was completed in two days (first involving Pakistan & 11th involving Australia).

=== 3rd Test ===
19–22 October 2002
Scorecard

Australia	v	Pakistan
444 (128.3 overs); Ricky Ponting 150 (395); Waqar Younis 4/55 (17.3 overs)		221 (71.1 overs); Hasan Raza 68 (154); Shane Warne 5/74 (30.1 overs)
		203 (f/o) (67.2 overs); Hasan Raza 54* (160); Glenn McGrath 3/18 (7 overs)

Australia won by an innings and 20 runs
Sharjah Cricket Association Stadium
Umpires: Steve Bucknor & Srinivas Venkataraghavan
Player of the match: Shane Warne (Aus)

- Australia won the toss & elected to bat
