= Australian cricket team in Pakistan in 1998–99 =

	Pakistan	Australia
- Dates: October – November 1998
Captains	Aamer Sohail	Mark Taylor (Tests); Steve Waugh (ODIs)

Test series
- Result: Australia won the 3-match series 1–0
Most runs	Saeed Anwar (290)	Mark Taylor (513)
Most wickets	Shahid Afridi (5); Arshad Khan (5); Wasim Akram (5); Shoaib Akhtar (5)	Stuart MacGill (15)
- Player of the series: Ijaz Ahmed (Pak) and Mark Taylor (Aus)

One Day International series
- Results: Australia won the 3-match series 3–0
Most runs	Mohammad Yousuf (192)	Ricky Ponting (195)
Most wickets	Saqlain Mushtaq (4)	Brendon Julian (7)

The Australian cricket team toured Pakistan in 1998–99. The teams played three Tests and One Day Internationals (ODI) each between October and November 1998. Australia won both the Test (1–0) and ODI series (3–0). Ijaz Ahmed and Mark Taylor were declared Men of the Series for the Test matches.

== Test ==
=== 1st Test ===
1–5 October 1998
(5-day match)
Scorecard

Pakistan	v	Australia
269 (97 overs); Saeed Anwar 145 (275); SCG MacGill 5/66 (22 overs)		513 (173.5 overs); SR Waugh 157 (326); Wasim Akram 3/111 (35 overs)
145 (75.5 overs); Saleem Malik 52* (159); SCG MacGill 4/47 (21 overs)

Australia won by an innings and 99 runs
Rawalpindi Cricket Stadium, Rawalpindi
Umpires: Javed Akhtar (PAK) and P Willey (ENG)
Player of the match: SR Waugh (AUS)

- Pakistan won the toss and elected to bat.
- CR Miller (AUS) made his Test debut.

=== 2nd Test ===
15–19 October 1998
(5-day match)
Scorecard

Australia	v	Pakistan
599/4d (174 overs); MA Taylor 334* (564); Shoaib Akhtar 2/107 (31 overs)		580/9d (172.1 overs); Ijaz Ahmed 155 (282); GD McGrath 3/131 (36 overs)
289/5 (88 overs); MA Taylor 92 (159); Mushtaq Ahmed 2/59 (20 overs)

Match drawn
Arbab Niaz Stadium, Peshawar
Umpires: SA Bucknor (WIN) and Mohammad Nazir (PAK)
Player of the match: MA Taylor (AUS)

- Australia won the toss and elected to bat.

=== 3rd Test ===
22–26 October 1998
(5-day match)
Scorecard

Australia	v	Pakistan
290 (125.3 overs); MJ Slater 96 (257); Shahid Afridi 5/52 (23.3 overs)		252 (89.4 overs); Aamer Sohail 133 (272); GD McGrath 5/66 (25 overs)
390 (142.3 overs); ME Waugh 117 (229); Shakeel Ahmed 4/91 (29.3 overs)		262/5 (86 overs); Ijaz Ahmed 120* (251); CR Miller 3/82 (25 overs)

Match drawn
National Stadium, Karachi
Umpires: DL Orchard (SA) and Riazuddin (PAK)
Player of the match: Aamer Sohail (PAK)

- Australia won the toss and elected to bat.
- Shahid Afridi and Shakeel Ahmed (PAK) made their Test debuts.

== ODIs ==
=== 1st ODI ===
6 November 1998
Scorecard

Australia; 324/8 (50 overs)	v	Pakistan; 238 (47.2 overs)
DS Lehmann 103 (101); Shoaib Akhtar 3/44 (9 overs)		Yousuf Youhana 92 (110); GD McGrath 3/35 (8 overs)

Australia won by 86 runs
National Stadium, Karachi
Umpires: Riazuddin and Saleem Badar
Player of the match: DS Lehmann (AUS)

- Pakistan won the toss and elected to field.

=== 2nd ODI ===
8 November 1998
Scorecard

Pakistan; 217/7 (50 overs)	v	Australia; 220/5 (48.1 overs)
Azhar Mahmood 65* (90); BP Julian 3/40 (10 overs)		MG Bevan 57* (83); Saqlain Mushtaq 3/35 (10 overs)

Australia won by 5 wickets
Arbab Niaz Stadium, Peshawar
Umpires: Athar Zaidi and Saleem Badar
Player of the match: BP Julian (AUS)

- Pakistan won the toss and elected to bat.
- Asif Mahmood (PAK) made his ODI debut.

=== 3rd ODI ===
10 November 1998
Scorecard

Pakistan; 315/8 (50 overs)	v	Australia; 316/4 (48.5 overs)
Ijaz Ahmed 111 (109); GD McGrath 2/58 (10 overs)		RT Ponting 124* (129); Saqlain Mushtaq 1/44 (9.5 overs)

Australia won by 6 wickets
Gaddafi Stadium, Lahore
Umpires: Mian Mohammad Aslam and Mohammad Nazir
Player of the match: RT Ponting (AUS)

- Pakistan won the toss and elected to bat.
- A Symonds (AUS) made his ODI debut.
