= Australian cricket team in Pakistan in 1959–60 =

International cricket tour

The Australian national cricket team visited Pakistan in November and December 1959 and played a three-match Test series against the Pakistani national cricket team. Australia won the Test series 2–0. Australia were captained by Richie Benaud and Pakistan by Fazal Mahmood.

== Tour match ==
28–30 November 1959
Scorecard

Pakistan President's XI	v	Australians
132 (54.1 overs); Shahid Mahmood 43; Ray Lindwall 4/27 (15 overs)		139 (41.5 overs); Ken Mackay 36; Intikhab Alam 5/65 (17.5 overs)
122 (52.5 overs); Alimuddin 50; Gordon Rorke 5/26 (12 overs)		117/7 (38.3 overs); Norm O'Neill 52*; Munir Malik 4/30 (19 overs)

Australians won by 3 wickets
Pindi Club Ground, Rawalpindi
Umpires: Akhtar Hussain and Salahuddin Ahmed

- Pakistan President's XI won the toss and elected to bat.
- Farooq Azeem (Pakistan President's XI) made his debut in first-class cricket.
- Peter Burge (Australians) passed 5,000 runs in first-class matches.
- Intikhab Alam picked his first five-wicket haul in first-class matches (5/65).

== Test series summary ==
=== First Test ===
13, 14, 15, 17, 18 November 1959
(5-day match)
Scorecard

Pakistan	v	Australia
200 (105.5 overs); Hanif Mohammad 66; AK Davidson 4/42 (23.5 overs)		225 (78.5 overs); RN Harvey 96; Fazal Mahmood 5/71 (35.5 overs)
134 (100.3 overs); DA Sharpe 35; KD Mackay 6/42 (45 overs)		112/2 (48.1 overs); CC McDonald 44*; Israr Ali 1/20 (9 overs)

Australia won by 8 wickets
Bangabandhu National Stadium, Dhaka, Bangladesh
Umpires: Ahmed Saeed and AA Qureshi

- Australia won the toss and elected to field.
- 16 November was taken as a rest day.
- DA Sharpe (PAK) made his Test debut.

=== Second Test ===
21, 22, 23, 25, 26 November 1959
(5-day match)
Scorecard

Pakistan	v	Australia
146 (66 overs); Hanif Mohammad 49; AK Davidson 4/48 (19 overs)		391/9d (118.3 overs); NCL O'Neill 134; Haseeb Ahsan 3/115 (33.3 overs)
366 (179.4 overs); Saeed Ahmed 166; LF Kline 7/75 (44 overs)		123/3 (25.3 overs); NCL O'Neill 43*; Mohammad Munaf 2/38 (10 overs)

Australia won by 7 wickets
Lahore Stadium, Lahore
Umpires: Ahmed Saeed and AA Qureshi

- Pakistan won the toss and elected to bat.
- 24 November was taken as a rest day.
- Mohammad Munaf (PAK) and GB Stevens (AUS) made their Test debuts.

=== Third Test ===
4, 5, 6, 8, 9 December 1959
(5-day match)
Scorecard

Pakistan	v	Australia
287 (131.5 overs); Saeed Ahmed 91; R Benaud 5/93 (49.5 overs)		257 (82.2 overs); RN Harvey 54; Fazal Mahmood 5/74 (30.2 overs)
194/8d (109.4 overs); Hanif Mohammad 101*; AK Davidson 3/70 (34 overs)		83/2 (33 overs); CC McDonald 30; Intikhab Alam 1/13 (6 overs)

Match drawn
National Stadium, Karachi
Umpires: Ahmed Saeed and Munawwar Hussain

- Pakistan won the toss and elected to bat.
- 7 December was taken as a rest day.
- Intikhab Alam and Munir Malik (both PAK) made their Test debuts.

== Eisenhower's visit ==
Day four of the Third Test in Karachi was notably attended by U.S. president Dwight Eisenhower, who was visiting Pakistan at the time. Eisenhower, who was accompanied by Pakistan's president Ayub Khan, became the first American President to watch Test cricket. According to Arunabha Sengupta, the day proved challenging for Pakistan who managed just 104 runs for the loss of five wickets, with Hanif Mohammed putting up the lone resistance against Australian bowlers.

The U.S. President, who was seen "cheering the rare attacking strokes" and applauding every "decent effort in the field", used the occasion for cricket diplomacy – signing a cricket bat and sporting a Pakistan blazer. When Australian captain Richie Benaud saw Eisenhower wearing the blazer, he jokingly remarked: "Mr President… you have joined the other camp."

The Karachi Test and the First Test in Dhaka were played on matting pitches. Benaud and the Australian team's manager, Sam Loxton, took the opportunity when meeting the two presidents to plead that Pakistan abandon matting pitches, as the standard of play on matting was inferior. Ayub Khan subsequently decreed that Pakistan's Tests would in future all be played on turf pitches, so the Karachi Test was the last anywhere to be played on matting.
