= Australian cricket team in Pakistan in 1964–65 =

International cricket tour

The Australian national cricket team visited Pakistan in October 1964 and played a single Test match, which was drawn, against the Pakistani national cricket team. Australia were captained by Bob Simpson, who scored a century in each innings, and Pakistan by Hanif Mohammad.

== Only Test ==
24, 25, 27, 28, 29 October 1964
(5-day match)
Scorecard

Pakistan	v	Australia
414 (138 overs); Khalid Ibadulla 166; GD McKenzie 6/69 (30 overs)		352 (133.5 overs); RB Simpson 153; Saeed Ahmed 3/41 (19 overs)
279/8d (122 overs); Javed Burki 62; TR Veivers 2/44 (30 overs)		227/2 (82 overs); RG Simpson 115; Nasim-ul-Ghani 1/24 (12 overs)

Match drawn
National Stadium, Karachi
Umpires: Daud Khan and Shujauddin

- Pakistan won the toss and elected to bat.
- 26 October was taken as a rest day.
- Khalid Ibadulla, Abdul Kadir, Shafqat Rana, Majid Khan, Asif Iqbal and Pervez Sajjad (all PAK) made their Test debuts.
