= Pakistani cricket team in Australia in 1978–79 =

International cricket tour

The Pakistan national cricket team, captained by Mushtaq Mohammed, toured Australia in March 1979 and played two Test matches against the Australia national cricket team. The series was drawn 1–1. Pakistan visited Sri Lanka en route for home and played a match against the Sri Lankan national cricket team.

== Test series summary ==
=== First Test ===
10–15 March 1979
Scorecard

Pakistan	v	Australia
196 (61.7 overs); Mushtaq Mohammad 36 (121); RM Hogg 4/49 (17 overs)		168 (61.6 overs); DF Whatmore 43 (147); Imran Khan 4/26 (18 overs)
353/9d (81.5 overs); Majid Khan 108 (157); RM Hogg 3/75 (19 overs)		310 (92.4 overs); AR Border 105 (275); Sarfraz Nawaz 9/86 (35.4 overs)

Pakistan won by 71 runs
Melbourne Cricket Ground, Melbourne
Umpires: RC Bailhache and CE Harvey

- Australia won the toss and elected to field.
- 13 March was taken as a rest day.
- PR Sleep and DF Whatmore (both AUS) made their Test debuts.

=== Second Test ===
24–29 March 1979
Scorecard

Pakistan	v	Australia
277 (77.6 overs); Javed Miandad 129* (276); AG Hurst 4/61 (23 overs)		327 (95.6 overs); AR Border 85 (250); Imran Khan 3/105 (32 overs)
285 (85.7 overs); Asif Iqbal 134* (280); AG Hurst 5/94 (24.7 overs)		236/3 (48.1 overs); WM Darling 79 (140)

Australia won by 7 wickets
Western Australia Cricket Association Ground, Perth
Umpires: AR Crafter and MG O'Connell

- Australia won the toss and elected to field.
- 27 March was taken as a rest day.
- JK Moss (AUS) made his Test debut.

== Sri Lanka ==
The Pakistan team had a stopover in Colombo after leaving Australia and played a limited overs match there on 4 April 1979 against the Sri Lankan national cricket team. Pakistan won by 55 runs. Sri Lanka were captained by Anura Tennekoon.

== Annual reviews ==
- Playfair Cricket Annual 1979
- Wisden Cricketers' Almanack 1980
