= Pakistani cricket team in Australia in 2019–20 =

International cricket tour

	Australia	Pakistan
- Dates: 31 October – 3 December 2019
Captains	Tim Paine (Tests); Aaron Finch (T20Is)	Azhar Ali (Tests); Babar Azam (T20Is)

Test series
- Result: Australia won the 2-match series 2–0
Most runs	David Warner (489)	Babar Azam (210)
Most wickets	Mitchell Starc (14)	Shaheen Afridi (5)
- Player of the series: David Warner (Aus)

Twenty20 International series
- Results: Australia won the 3-match series 2–0
Most runs	Aaron Finch (106)	Babar Azam (115)
Most wickets	Kane Richardson (6)	Mohammad Amir (1); Mohammad Irfan (1); Imad Wasim (1)
- Player of the series: Steve Smith (Aus)

The Pakistan cricket team toured Australia from October to December 2019 to play two Tests and three Twenty20 International (T20I) matches. The Test series formed part of the inaugural 2019–2021 ICC World Test Championship. The second Test was a day/night match at the Adelaide Oval. Cricket Australia confirmed the fixtures for the tour in May 2019.

Ahead of the tour, Sarfaraz Ahmed was sacked as captain of Pakistan's team, following Pakistan's poor run of form. Azhar Ali and Babar Azam were named as the captains of the Test and T20I squads respectively.

Australia won the T20 series 2–0, after the first match finished as a no result. Australia also won the Test series 2–0, winning both matches by an innings margin.

== Squads ==
Tests		T20Is	
Australia	Pakistan	Australia	Pakistan
Tim Paine (c, wk); Pat Cummins (vc); Travis Head (vc); Cameron Bancroft; Joe Burns; Josh Hazlewood; Marnus Labuschagne; Nathan Lyon; Michael Neser; James Pattinson; Steve Smith; Mitchell Starc; Matthew Wade; David Warner	Azhar Ali (c); Mohammad Abbas; Shaheen Afridi; Iftikhar Ahmed; Abid Ali; Babar Azam; Kashif Bhatti; Imran Khan; Shan Masood; Muhammad Musa; Mohammad Rizwan (wk); Asad Shafiq; Naseem Shah; Yasir Shah; Haris Sohail; Imam-ul-Haq	Aaron Finch (c); Alex Carey (vc, wk); Pat Cummins (vc); Ashton Agar; Sean Abbott; ~~Glenn Maxwell~~; Ben McDermott; Kane Richardson; D'Arcy Short; Steve Smith; Billy Stanlake; Mitchell Starc; Ashton Turner; Andrew Tye; David Warner; Adam Zampa	Babar Azam (c); Iftikhar Ahmed; Asif Ali; Mohammad Amir; Mohammad Hasnain; Mohammad Irfan; Shadab Khan; Muhammad Musa; Usman Qadir; Wahab Riaz; Mohammad Rizwan (wk); Khushdil Shah; Haris Sohail; Imam-ul-Haq; Imad Wasim; Fakhar Zaman

Ahead of the T20I series, Glenn Maxwell took an indefinite break from cricket to deal with a mental health issue, that ruled him out of the T20I series with D'Arcy Short was named as his replacement. Sean Abbott was added to Australia's squad for the third T20I match. Australia's James Pattinson was suspended from the first Test of the series. He was found guilty of using abusive language during Victoria's loss against Queensland in the fourth round of the 2019–20 Sheffield Shield.

== Tour matches ==
=== 20 over match: Cricket Australia XI vs Pakistan ===
31 October 2019
14:30
Scorecard

Cricket Australia XI; 6/134 (20 overs)	v	Pakistan; 4/138 (17.5 overs)
Nathan McSweeney 30 (26); Shadab Khan 3/30 (4 overs)		Fakhar Zaman 43 (39); Ben Dwarshuis 2/18 (3 overs)

Pakistan won by 6 wickets
Bankstown Oval, Bankstown
Umpires: Ben Treloar (Aus) and Tony Wilds (Aus)
Player of the match: Shadab Khan (Pak)

- Cricket Australia XI won the toss and elected to bat.

=== Three-day match: Australia A vs Pakistan ===
11–13 November 2019 (D/N)
Scorecard

Pakistan	v	Australia A
428 (118 overs); Babar Azam 157 (197); Jhye Richardson 3/79 (29 overs)		122 (56.4 overs); Cameron Bancroft 49 (155); Imran Khan 5/32 (12 overs)
3/152d (40.5 overs); Iftikhar Ahmed 79* (99); Michael Neser 2/11 (8 overs)		2/91 (35 overs); Usman Khawaja 37* (75); Naseem Shah 1/21 (8 overs)

Match drawn
Perth Stadium, Perth
Umpires: Sam Nogajski (Aus) and Paul Wilson (Aus)

- Pakistan won the toss and elected to bat.

=== Two-day match: Cricket Australia XI vs Pakistan ===
15–16 November 2019
Scorecard

Pakistan	v	Cricket Australia XI
7/386d (90 overs); Asad Shafiq 101* (172); Lloyd Pope 5/100 (24 overs)		7/246 (79.5 overs); Jonathan Merlo 78 (115); Mohammad Abbas 2/22 (14 overs)

Match drawn
WACA Ground, Perth
Umpires: Nathan Johnstone (Aus) and Claire Polosak (Aus)

- Pakistan won the toss and elected to bat.

== T20I series ==
=== 1st T20I ===
3 November 2019
14:30
Scorecard

Pakistan; 5/107 (15 overs)	v	Australia; 0/41 (3.1 overs)
Babar Azam 59* (38); Kane Richardson 2/16 (3 overs)		Aaron Finch 37* (16)

No result
Sydney Cricket Ground, Sydney
Umpires: Gerard Abood (Aus) and Paul Wilson (Aus)

- Australia won the toss and elected to field.
- Rain during Australia's innings prevented any further play.
- Babar Azam captained Pakistan for the first time in T20Is.
- Aaron Finch set the record for the most matches as captain of Australia in T20Is with 29.

=== 2nd T20I ===
5 November 2019
19:10 (N)
Scorecard

Pakistan; 6/150 (20 overs)	v	Australia; 3/151 (18.3 overs)
Iftikhar Ahmed 62* (34); Ashton Agar 2/23 (4 overs)		Steve Smith 80* (51); Mohammad Irfan 1/27 (4 overs)

Australia won by 7 wickets
Manuka Oval, Canberra
Umpires: Gerard Abood (Aus) and Shawn Craig (Aus)
Player of the match: Steve Smith (Aus)

- Pakistan won the toss and elected to bat.
- This was the first T20I match to be played at this ground.

=== 3rd T20I ===
8 November 2019
16:30 (D/N)
Scorecard

Pakistan; 8/106 (20 overs)	v	Australia; 0/109 (11.5 overs)
Iftikhar Ahmed 45 (37); Kane Richardson 3/18 (4 overs)		Aaron Finch 52* (36)

Australia won by 10 wickets
Perth Stadium, Perth
Umpires: Sam Nogajski (Aus) and Paul Wilson (Aus)
Player of the match: Sean Abbott (Aus)

- Australia won the toss and elected to field.
- Muhammad Musa and Khushdil Shah (Pak) both made their T20I debuts.
- This was the first T20I match to be played at this ground.

== Test series ==
=== 1st Test ===
21–25 November 2019 (Note: While five days of play were scheduled for each Test, both Tests reached a result in four days.)
Scorecard

Pakistan	v	Australia
240 (86.2 overs); Asad Shafiq 76 (134); Mitchell Starc 4/52 (18.2 overs)		580 (157.4 overs); Marnus Labuschagne 185 (279); Yasir Shah 4/205 (48.4 overs)
335 (84.2 overs); Babar Azam 104 (173); Josh Hazlewood 4/63 (21 overs)

Australia won by an innings and 5 runs
The Gabba, Brisbane
Umpires: Richard Illingworth (Eng) and Richard Kettleborough (Eng)
Player of the match: Marnus Labuschagne (Aus)

- Pakistan won the toss and elected to bat.
- Naseem Shah (Pak) made his Test debut.
- Marnus Labuschagne (Aus) scored his first century in Tests.
- World Test Championship points: Australia 60, Pakistan 0.

=== 2nd Test ===
29 November–3 December 2019 (D/N)
Scorecard

Australia	v	Pakistan
3/589d (127 overs); David Warner 335* (418); Shaheen Afridi 3/88 (30 overs)		302 (94.2 overs); Yasir Shah 113 (213); Mitchell Starc 6/66 (25 overs)
		239 (82 overs) (f/o); Shan Masood 68 (127); Nathan Lyon 5/69 (25 overs)

Australia won by an innings and 48 runs
Adelaide Oval, Adelaide
Umpires: Michael Gough (Eng) and Richard Illingworth (Eng)
Player of the match: David Warner (Aus)

- Australia won the toss and elected to bat.
- Muhammad Musa (Pak) made his Test debut.
- Josh Hazlewood (Aus) played in his 50th Test.
- David Warner (Aus) scored his first triple century in Tests.
- David Warner's 335 not out is the highest individual score by a batter in Day-Night Test Matches.
- Steve Smith (Aus) became the fastest batsman, in terms of innings, to score 7,000 runs in Tests (126).
- Yasir Shah (Pak) scored his first century in Tests.
- World Test Championship points: Australia 60, Pakistan 0.
