= Abdullah Shafique =

Pakistani cricketer (born 1999)

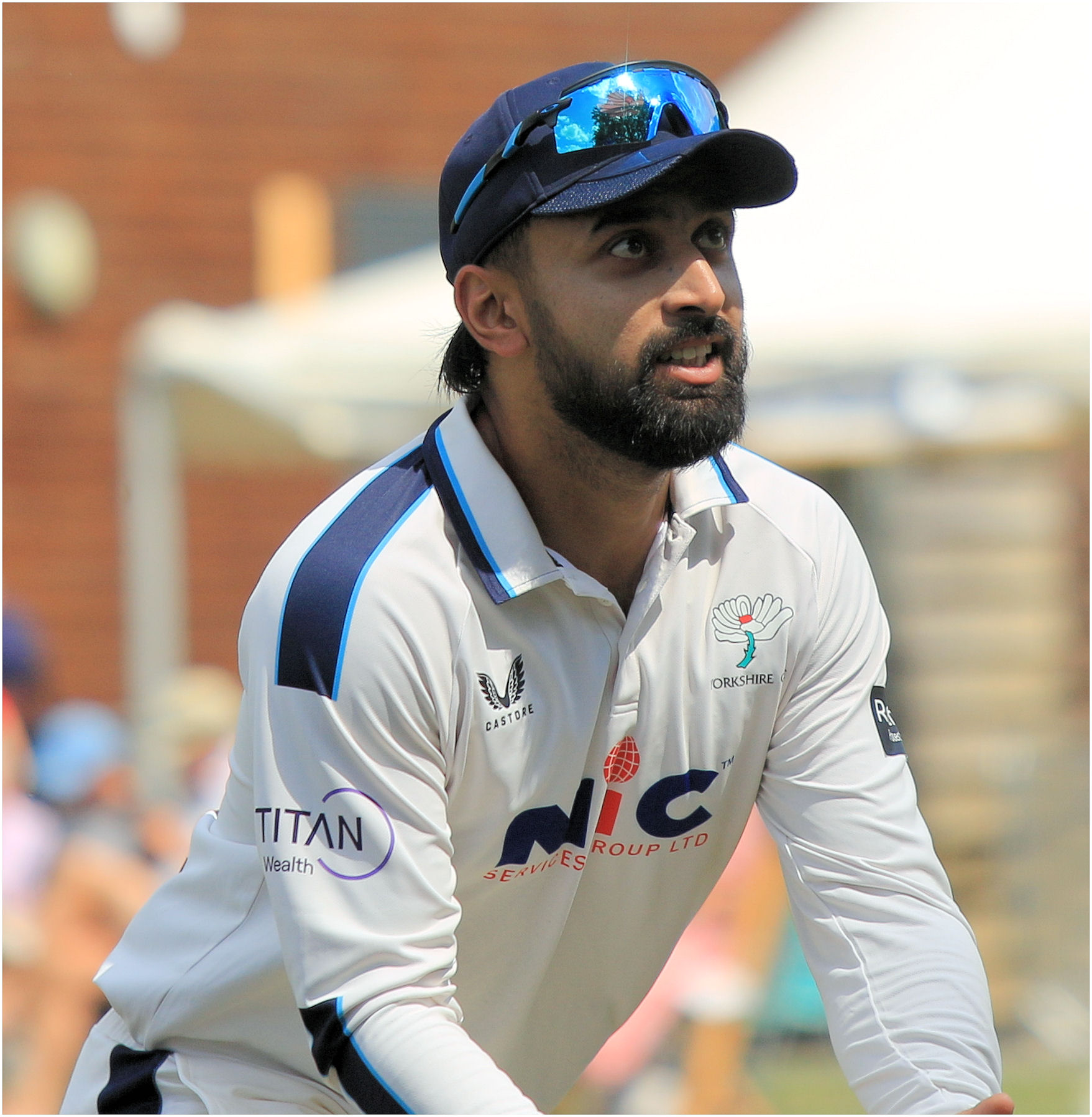
- Shafique playing for Yorkshire in 2025

Personal information
- Born: 20 November 1999 (age 26); Sialkot, Punjab, Pakistan
- Height: 5 ft 10 in (178 cm)
- Batting: Right-handed
- Bowling: Right-arm off break
- Role: Top-order batter
- Relatives: Arshad Ali (uncle)

International information
- National side: Pakistan (2020–present)
- Test debut (cap 246): 26 November 2021 v Bangladesh
- Last Test: 9 September 2026 v England
- ODI debut (cap 238): 21 August 2022 v Netherlands
- Last ODI: 12 August 2025 v West Indies
- ODI shirt no.: 57
- T20I debut (cap 89): 10 November 2020 v Zimbabwe
- Last T20I: 27 March 2023 v Afghanistan
- T20I shirt no.: 57

Domestic team information
- Years: Team
- 2019/20–2020/21: Central Punjab (squad no. 57)
- 2021/22–2023: Balochistan (squad no. 57)
- 2022–present: Lahore Qalandars (squad no. 57)
- 2025: Yorkshire

Career statistics
Competition	Test	ODI	T20I	FC
Matches	28	27	6	54
Runs scored	1,878	737	64	3,803
Batting average	38.32	29.48	12.80	43.71
100s/50s	6/7	1/6	0/0	12/16
Top score	201	113	41*	232
Catches/stumpings	19/–	14/–	3/–	40/–
- Source: ESPNcricinfo, 12 September 2026

Abdullah Shafique (Note: Punjabi, Urdu: عبد اللہ شفیق) (pronounced [əbdʊllaːɦ ʃəfiːq]; born 20 November 1999) is a Pakistani international cricketer who plays for the Pakistan national cricket team in all formats. A right-handed top-order batter, he also plays for Lahore Qalandars in the PSL and previously played for Central Punjab and Balochistan in Pakistan's domestic cricket.

== Early life and family ==
Shafique was born in Sialkot on 20 November 1999 into a Punjabi Muslim Gujjar family. His father Shafiq Ahmed is a long-term resident of Dubai, where he moved in 1991. He was a professional cricketer and later became a cricket coach. His uncle Arshad Ali played international cricket for the United Arab Emirates.

Under the supervision of his father, who has coached at GEMS Modern Academy in Dubai since 2003 and has produced more than 20 international cricketers for the UAE, Abdullah began his cricket training at the age of 3 and was called up to the Pakistan under-19 team at the age of 16.

Outside cricket, Abdullah also enjoys music, is a singer himself and plays the guitar; videos of different songs he has sung have gone viral.

== Domestic career ==
In November 2017, Shafique was bought by Multan Sultans in the 2018 Pakistan Super League players draft but did not play in the competition.

In December 2019, he made his first-class debut for Central Punjab in the 2019–20 Quaid-e-Azam Trophy, scoring 133 runs.

In September 2020, he made his Twenty20 debut for Central Punjab in the 2020–21 National T20 Cup, scoring 102 not out.

As a result, he became the first Pakistani batsman to score a century on his first-class and T20 debut.

In December 2021, Shafique was named in Lahore Qalandar's squad for the 2022 Pakistan Super League season (PSL).

== International career ==
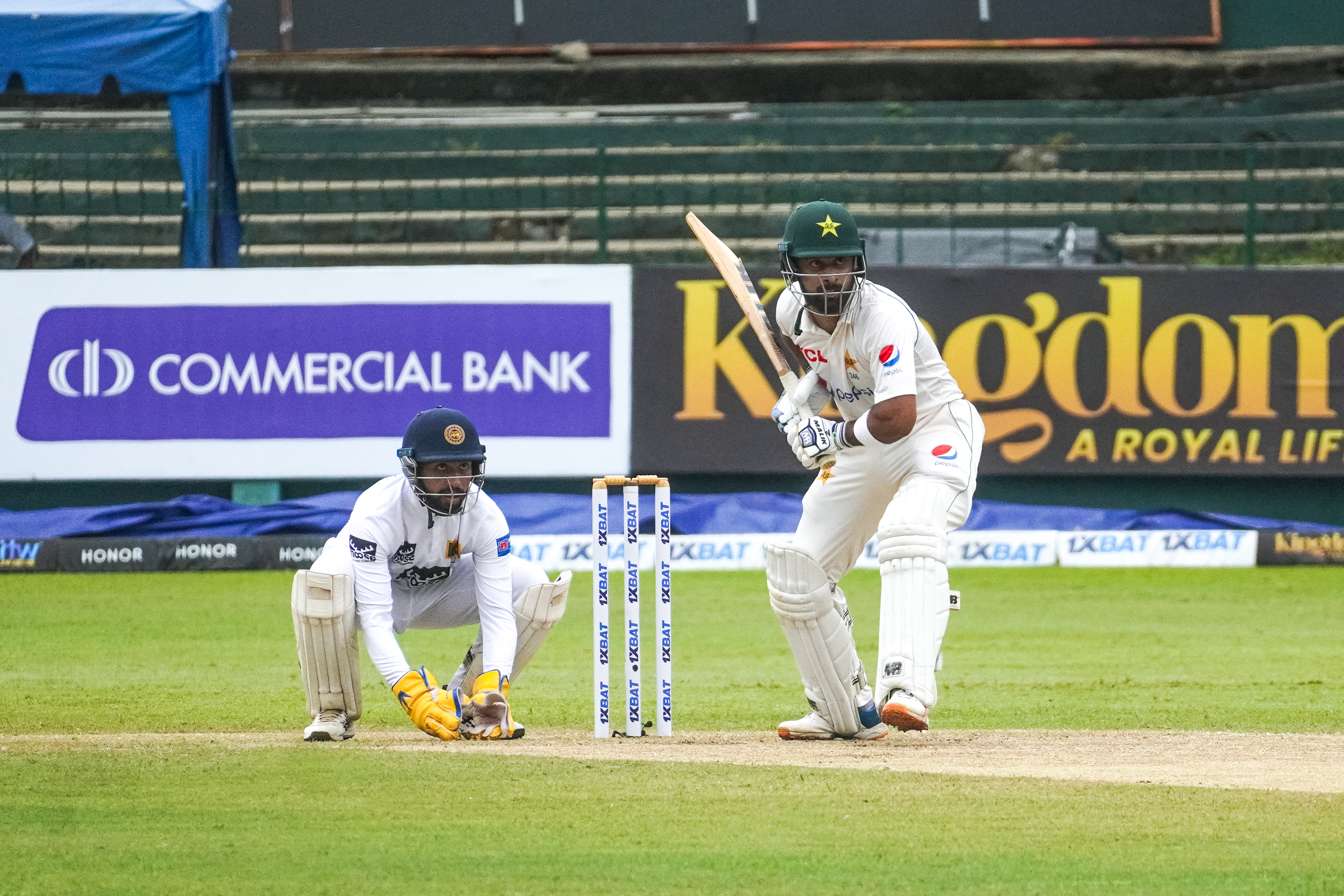
Shafique batting against Sri Lanka in 2023

In October 2020, following his performances in the National T20 Cup, he was named in a 22-man squad of "probables" for Pakistan's home series against Zimbabwe.

In November 2020, he was named in Pakistan's 15-man squad for the third One Day International (ODI) match against Zimbabwe, though he did not play. He made his Twenty20 International (T20I) debut for Pakistan, against Zimbabwe, on 10 November 2020. The same month, he was named in Pakistan's 35-man squad for their tour to New Zealand.

In January 2021, he was named in Pakistan's Test squad for their series against South Africa.

In March 2021, he was named in Pakistan's One Day International (ODI) squad for their series against South Africa, and their Test squad for their series against Zimbabwe.

In June 2021, Shafique was again named in Pakistan's ODI squad, this time for the series against England. He was also named in Pakistan's Test squad for the series against the West Indies.

In September 2021, he was named in Pakistan's ODI squad for their series against New Zealand. The following month, he was named in the Pakistan Shaheens squad for their tour of Sri Lanka.

In November 2021, he was named in Pakistan's Test squad for their series against Bangladesh. He made his Test debut on 26 November 2021, for Pakistan against Bangladesh.

In February 2022, Shafique was named in Pakistan's Test squad for the series against Australia. Abdullah Shafique scored his maiden century in the first match's fourth innings. He scored 397 runs during the three Test matches.

In March 2022, Shafique was named in Pakistan's One Day International (ODI) squad for their series against Australia.

In May 2022, he was named in Pakistan's ODI squad for the series against the West Indies.

In July 2022, he was named in Pakistan's squad for the tour of Sri Lanka. In the fourth innings of the first Test, he scored a historic 160* to win the match in Galle.

In August 2022, he was named in Pakistan's ODI squad, for their tour of the Netherlands. He made his ODI debut on 21 August 2022, for Pakistan, against the Netherlands.

In December 2022, he scored his third Test hundred against England at Rawalpindi.

In October 2023, he made his World Cup debut in the 2023 World Cup against Sri Lanka held in Hyderabad, India, and marked the occasion by scoring his first ODI century in his very first World Cup match, leading Pakistan to victory and simultaneously breaking the record for the highest successful run chase in a World Cup match. He scored 113 off 103 balls with a strike rate of 109.71. He also played an inning of 64 runs on 61 balls in a losing cause in his second world cup match against Australia in M.Chinaswamy stadium Banglore on 20 October 2023. On 23 October, he batted sensibly against Afghanistan scoring 58 runs off 75 balls before being pinned LBW by Noor Ahmed.

In August 2026, Shafique returned to Pakistan's Test side after an absence of nearly two years for the second Test in the West Indies. He scored his sixth Test century in the match, his first outside Asia. He won the Player of the Match for his unbeaten knocks of 160* and 24* in what was Pakistan's first away Test win in three years. Early in his career, he became the fastest Pakistani batter to 1,000 Test runs before a prolonged dip in form saw him lose his place in the side.
