= Australian cricket team against Pakistan in England in 2010 =

	Australia	Pakistan
- Dates: 5 July – 25 July 2010
Captains	Ricky Ponting (Tests); Michael Clarke (T20Is)	Shahid Afridi (T20Is and 1st Test); Salman Butt (2nd Test)

Test series
- Result: 2-match series drawn 1–1
Most runs	Simon Katich (187)	Salman Butt (213)
Most wickets	Shane Watson (11)	Mohammad Aamer (11); Mohammad Asif (11)

Twenty20 International series
- Results: Pakistan won the 2-match series 2–0
Most runs	David Hussey (67)	Umar Akmal (89)
Most wickets	Dirk Nannes (5)	Mohammad Aamer (6)

The Pakistan cricket team played against Australia in England from 5–25 July 2010. The tour consisted of two T20Is and two Tests. Pakistan was the official home nation but the tour was transferred to England for security reasons.

== Twenty20 Series ==
=== 1st T20I ===
5 July
Scorecard

Pakistan; 167/8 (20 overs)	v	Australia; 144 (18.4 overs)
Umar Akmal 64 (31); Shaun Tait 2/25 (4 overs)		David Warner 41 (31); Saeed Ajmal 3/26 (3.4 overs)

Pakistan won by 23 runs
Edgbaston, Birmingham
Umpires: Aleem Dar (Pak) and Asad Rauf (Pak)
Player of the match: Umar Akmal (Pak)

- Pakistan won the toss and elected to bat.

=== 2nd T20I ===
6 July
Scorecard

Pakistan; 162/9 (20 overs)	v	Australia; 151 (19.4 overs)
Kamran Akmal 33 (25); Steve O'Keefe 3/29 (4 overs)		David Hussey 33 (27); Mohammed Aamer 3/27 (4 overs)

Pakistan won by 11 runs
Edgbaston, Birmingham
Umpires: Asad Rauf (Pak) and Zameer Haider (Pak)
Player of the match: Mohammed Aamer (Pak)

- Pakistan won the toss and elected to bat.

== Test series ==
=== 1st Test ===
13–17 July
Scorecard

Australia	v	Pakistan
253 (76.5 overs); Simon Katich 80 (138); Mohammad Aamer 4/72 (19.5 overs)		148 (40.5 overs); Salman Butt 63 (94); Shane Watson 5/40 (7.5 overs)
334 (91 overs); Simon Katich 83 (174); Umar Gul 4/61 (21 overs)		289 (91.1 overs); Salman Butt 92 (173); Marcus North 6/55 (18.1 overs)

Australia won by 150 runs
Lord's, London
Umpires: Ian Gould (Eng) and Rudi Koertzen (SA)
Player of the match: Simon Katich (Aus) and Salman Butt (Pak)

- Pakistan won the toss and elected to field.
- Steve Smith, Tim Paine (Aus) and Azhar Ali, Umar Amin (Pak) all made their Test debuts.
- Play on days 1 and 2 was reduced due to bad light.
- Play on days 3 and 4 was reduced due to rain.

=== 2nd Test ===
21–25 July
Scorecard

Australia	v	Pakistan
88 (33.1 overs); Tim Paine 17 (47); Mohammad Aamer 3/20 (11 overs)		258 (64.5 overs); Salman Butt 45 (68); Shane Watson 6/33 (11 overs)
349 (95.3 overs); Steve Smith 77 (100); Mohammad Aamer 4/86 (27 overs)		180/7 (50.4 overs); Imran Farhat 67 (95); Ben Hilfenhaus 3/39 (13 overs)

Pakistan won by 3 wickets
Headingley, Leeds
Umpires: Ian Gould (Eng) and Rudi Koertzen (SA)
Player of the match: Shane Watson (Aus) and Mohammad Aamer (Pak)

- Australia won the toss and elected to bat.
- Play on day 1 was reduced due to rain and bad light.
- Play on day 2 was reduced due to bad light.

== Tour matches ==
=== First Class: Kent vs Pakistanis ===
28–30 June
Scorecard

Pakistanis	v	Kent
360 (87 overs); Umar Akmal 153 (188); Mark Lawson 4/93 (16 overs)		259 (69 overs); Joe Denly 63 (77); Mohammad Aamer 5/54 (13 overs)
264/4d (65 overs); Umar Amin 73 (126); Mark Lawson 2/71 (18 overs)		150/3 (28 overs); Joe Denly 69 (57); Shoaib Malik 2/17 (5 overs)

Match drawn
St Lawrence Ground, Canterbury
Umpires: Mark Eggleston and John Steele

- Pakistanis won the toss and elected to bat.

=== Tour match: Derbyshire vs Australians ===
8–9 July
Scorecard

Australians	v	Derbyshire
436 (89.3 overs); Michael Hussey 132 (140); Mark Footitt 3/68 (14 overs)		235/5 (79 overs); Chris Rogers 93 (164); Mitchell Johnson 2/17 (10 overs)

Match drawn
County Ground, Derby
Umpires: Barry Dudleston and Andy Hicks

- Australians won the toss and elected to bat.

=== Tour match: Leicestershire vs Pakistanis ===
8–9 July
Scorecard

Leicestershire	v	Pakistanis
296/7d (99 overs); Greg Smith 87 (198); Tanvir Ahmed 2/41 (13.3 overs)		280/7 (82 overs); Yasir Hameed 58 (80); Wayne White 1/21 (13 overs)

Match drawn
Grace Road, Leicester
Umpires: Paul Baldwin (Ger) and Peter Willey

- Leicestershire won the toss and elected to bat.
