= Australian cricket team in Pakistan in 1956–57 =

International cricket tour

The Australia national cricket team visited Pakistan in October 1956 and played a single Test match against Pakistan. Pakistan won the Test. Australia were captained by Ian Johnson and Pakistan by Abdul Hafeez Kardar. The Test match was the first between the two teams. The opening day's play was the slowest in the history of Test cricket, with just 95 runs scored.

The Australians were on the way home from their 1956 tour of England. After this single Test in Pakistan, they went on to India to play a three-Test series before returning to Australia.

== Test series ==
=== Only Test ===
11, 12, 13, 15, 17 October 1956
(5-day match)
Scorecard

Australia	v	Pakistan
80 (53.1 overs); KR Miller 21; Fazal Mahmood 6/34 (27 overs)		199 (91.3 overs); AH Kardar 69; IWG Johnson 4/50 (20.3 overs)
187 (109.5 overs); R Benaud 56; Fazal Mahmood 7/80 (48 overs)		69/1 (48.4 overs); Alimuddin 34*; AK Davidson 1/9 (9 overs)

Pakistan won by 9 wickets
National Stadium, Karachi
Umpires: Daud Khan and Idrees Baig

- Australia won the toss and elected to bat.
- 14 and 16 October were taken as rest days.
