= Iqbal Qasim =

Pakistani cricketer (born 1953)

Personal information
- Born: 6 August 1953 (age 73); Karachi, Pakistan
- Batting: Left-handed
- Bowling: Slow left-arm orthodox

International information
- National side: Pakistan
- Test debut (cap 75): 24 December 1976 v Australia
- Last Test: 07 October 1988 v Australia
- ODI debut (cap 24): 30 December 1977 v England
- Last ODI: 29 October 1988 v Bangladesh

Career statistics
Competition	Test	ODI	FC	LA
Matches	50	15	246	95
Runs scored	549	39	2,432	329
Batting average	13.07	6.50	14.47	10.61
100s/50s	0/1	0/0	0/3	0/0
Top score	56	13	61	23
Balls bowled	13,019	664	55,387	4,223
Wickets	171	12	999	119
Bowling average	28.11	41.66	20.48	20.54
5 wickets in innings	8	0	68	2
10 wickets in match	2	0	14	0
Best bowling	7/49	3/13	9/80	6/25
Catches/stumpings	42/–	3/–	172/–	27/–
- Source: CricInfo, 4 February 2006

Mohammad Iqbal Qasim (Urdu: محمد اقبال قاسم; born 6 August 1953) is a former Pakistani cricketer who played in 50 Test matches and 15 One Day Internationals between 1976 and 1988.

== Early life and education ==
Iqbal Qasim was born on 6 August 1953 in Karachi to a Memon business family. He attended the University of Karachi, where he graduated with a master's degree in economics.

== Career ==
Qasim ended his career with 171 wickets in his 50 Test matches, at approximately 3.5 wickets a match. His accurate bowling saw his economy rate at a low 2.21. He pushed the ball through quicker than normal, not extracting great turn, but deceiving batsmen through variations in pace and trajectory.

He is most notable for spinning Pakistan to victory in the 5th Test at Bangalore in the 1987 India-Pakistan series, and thus securing Pakistan's first series win on Indian soil. He took 9/121, including the key scalp of Sunil Gavaskar for 96 in the last innings of the game.

Iqbal Qasim remained in the shadows of his teammate, leg spinner Abdul Qadir, although his career returns are superior by average and very similar by strike rate.

He became Pakistan's chief selector in 2012.
