= Imran Khan Cricket Stadium =

Cricket Stadium in Peshawar, Pakistan

Coordinates: 34°1′18″N 71°34′42″E

- د عمران خان کرکټ لوبغالی
- Interactive map of Imran Khan Cricket Stadium

Ground information
- Location: Peshawar, Khyber Pakhtunkhwa, Pakistan
- Country: Pakistan
- Establishment: 1984; 42 years ago
- Capacity: 30,000
- Owner: Pakistan Cricket Board
- Operator: Pakistan Cricket Board
- Tenants: Peshawar Zalmi; Khyber Pakhtunkhwa cricket team Pakistan national cricket team

International information
- First men's Test: 8–11 Sep 1995: Pakistan v Sri Lanka
- Last men's Test: 27–30 Aug 2003: Pakistan v Bangladesh
- First men's ODI: 2 Nov 1984: Pakistan v India
- Last men's ODI: 6 Feb 2006: Pakistan v India
- As of 29 August 2009; Source: ESPNcricinfo

Imran Khan Cricket Stadium, formerly known as Arbab Niaz Stadium and Shahi Bagh Stadium, is a cricket stadium in Peshawar, Pakistan. It is owned by Khyber Pakhtunkhwa Cricket Association (KPCA). The stadium is named after one of the greatest Pakistani Cricket player and the legendary captain who led Pakistan to their only ODI world cup victory in 1992, Imran Khan, the former Prime Minister (2018–2022).

== History ==
The ground was constructed as Arbab Niaz Stadium in November 1984, named after federal minister for sports Arbab Niaz. In 1985 it replaced the Peshawar Club Ground which had been the home ground for the Khyber Pakhtunkhwa cricket team since 1938. In 1986 the stadium replaced the Peshawar Club Ground for the Peshawar cricket team which had also been using the same venue as a home ground since 1956. The stadium hosted international cricket between 1984 and 2006, including 15 One Day Internationals (ODIs) and 6 Test matches.

=== Final international matches ===
Due to terrorist attacks in Pakistan, including the 2002 Karachi bus bombing and the 2002 US consulate bombing in Karachi, international cricket teams refused to tour parts of Pakistan. This stadium was one of those venues where international teams did not want to play at, because of Peshawar's proximity to the war in Afghanistan.

In 2003, the South African national cricket team toured Pakistan. Arbab Niaz Cricket Stadium was scheduled to host the 3rd match of a Test series between Pakistan and South Africa, but ahead of the tour, the Union Cricket Board of South Africa (UCB) requested that this match be moved due to security concerns. Initially the Pakistan Cricket Board (PCB) tried to keep the original schedule in place, but following a bomb blast in Karachi on the eve of the tour, the PCB acquiesced to the UCB's demands. The Test series was shortened to two matches, and Arbab Niaz Cricket Stadium did not host any matches. Between the beginning of the war on terror in 2001 and the end of 2005, Arbab Niaz Cricket Stadium only hosted three Pakistan matches: a Test match against Bangladesh in 2003, and two ODIs against India and Zimbabwe in 2004.

The last international match to be played at Arbab Niaz Cricket Stadium was against India in February 2006. An Indian delegation met with local law enforcement in Peshawar in December 2005 and decided that the security measures were adequate for India and Pakistan to play an ODI against each other in the city. The match was played on 6 February 2006. The match was shortened due to poor light, and Pakistan won by 7 runs (the Duckworth–Lewis method for adjusting scores was used to determine the result). During the match a large number of spectators barged onto the field, which led Chris Broad (the ICC match referee) to express unhappiness at the lack of security measures in place. The ICC's other objections to the stadium included its lack of floodlights and the poor quality of the dressing rooms and training facilities provided for playing teams. The poor facilities were a result of neglect from the provincial government which controlled the stadium.

The PCB intended to continue using the stadium for international cricket, but sought to take over control of the stadium from the local administration. However, after continuing terrorist attacks in Pakistan, international teams refused to play cricket in Pakistan altogether, and as of 2026, no further international matches have been played at the stadium.

=== Renovation efforts and name change ===
The provincial government of Khyber Pakhtunkhwa decided to upgrade the stadium in 2017 to help bring international cricket back to the city. The renovations were to include an increased capacity of 34,000+ (up from 14,000), floodlights, a new electronic scoreboard, and better facilities for players modeled on Dubai International Cricket Stadium. The government initiated the renovations in 2018 with a completion date of 18 October 2021, through a contract worth Rs1.4 billion. The renovations were not completed in time, and in December 2022, a government official reported the new completion date as being in June 2023, subject to funding, and the total cost of the project had grown to Rs2 billion. A 2022, report from the Planning and Development Department found irregularities in the project and said that the contractor was unqualified to complete the work.

Stadium's renovations became a point of conflict between the PCB and local administration. In 2022, Peshawar Zalmi owner Javed Afridi claimed that the stadium's renovations would be complete in time to host Peshawar's matches in the 2023 Pakistan Super League. However, security forces did not declare the venue suitable for international cricket, and PCB chairman Ramiz Raja stated that the stadium would not be a high enough standard to host PSL matches.

In February 2025, the stadium was decided to be renamed to Imran Khan Stadium after Imran Khan, a former Pakistan cricket captain and Prime Minister. Despite several controversies and opposition, it was officially renamed in April 2025. In June 2025, an exhibition match between KP Zalmi and KP Panthers was played.

== Stats and records ==
=== International matches hosted ===
(as of 15 March 2026)

- Test - 6
- ODI - 15

=== Team records ===
Imran Khan Cricket Stadium Records
Category	Test Matches	ODI Matches
Highest Inning Score	599/4d - Australia vs Pakistan (1998)	328 - India vs Pakistan (2006)
Lowest Inning Score	96 - Bangladesh vs Pakistan (2003)	127 - New Zealand vs Pakistan (1990)
Largest Victory - by Innings	Innings & 40 runs - Pakistan vs Sri Lanka (1995)	—N/a
Largest Victory - by Runs	57 runs - Sri Lanka vs Pakistan (2000)	108 runs - England vs Sri Lanka (1987)
Largest Victory - By Wickets	9 Wickets - Pakistan vs Sri Lanka (2003)	8 Wickets - Pakistan vs Sri Lanka (1985)
Largest Victory - by Balls Remaining	—N/a	90 balls - England vs United Arab Emirates (1996)
Narrowest Victory - by Runs	57 runs - Sri Lanka vs Pakistan (2000)	7 runs - Pakistan vs India (2006)
Narrowest Victory - by Wickets	7 Wickets - Zimbabwe vs Pakistan (1998)	3 Wickets - Australia vs South Africa (1994)
Narrowest Victory - by Balls Remaining	—N/a	2 balls - Australia vs South Africa (1994)

=== Individual records ===
Individual Records
Category	Test Matches	ODI Matches
Most Runs	426 - Mark Taylor Australia	172 - Shoaib Malik Pakistan
Highest Score	334* - Mark Taylor Australia vs. Pakistan (1998)	117 - Ijaz Ahmed Pakistan vs. Zimbabwe (1996)
Most Wickets	20 - Wasim Akram & Shoaib Akhtar Pakistan	8 - Phillip DeFreitas England
Best Bowling Figures - in innings	6/50 - Shoaib Akhtar Pakistan vs. Bangladesh (2003)	5/11 - Waqar Younis VS. New Zealand (1990)
Best Bowling Figures - in Match	10/80 - Shoaib Akhtar Pakistan vs. Bangladesh (2003)	—N/a

== Tournament record ==
=== Cricket World Cup ===
Year	Date	Team #1	Team #2	Round	Result
1987 Cricket World Cup	17 October 1987	England	Sri Lanka	Group Stage	England won by 108 runs
1996 Cricket World Cup	18 February 1996	United Arab Emirates	England	Group Stage	England won by 8 wickets
1996 Cricket World Cup	22 February 1996	England	Netherlands	Group Stage	England won by 49 runs
