= Ijaz Ahmed (cricketer, born 1968) =

Pakistani cricketer

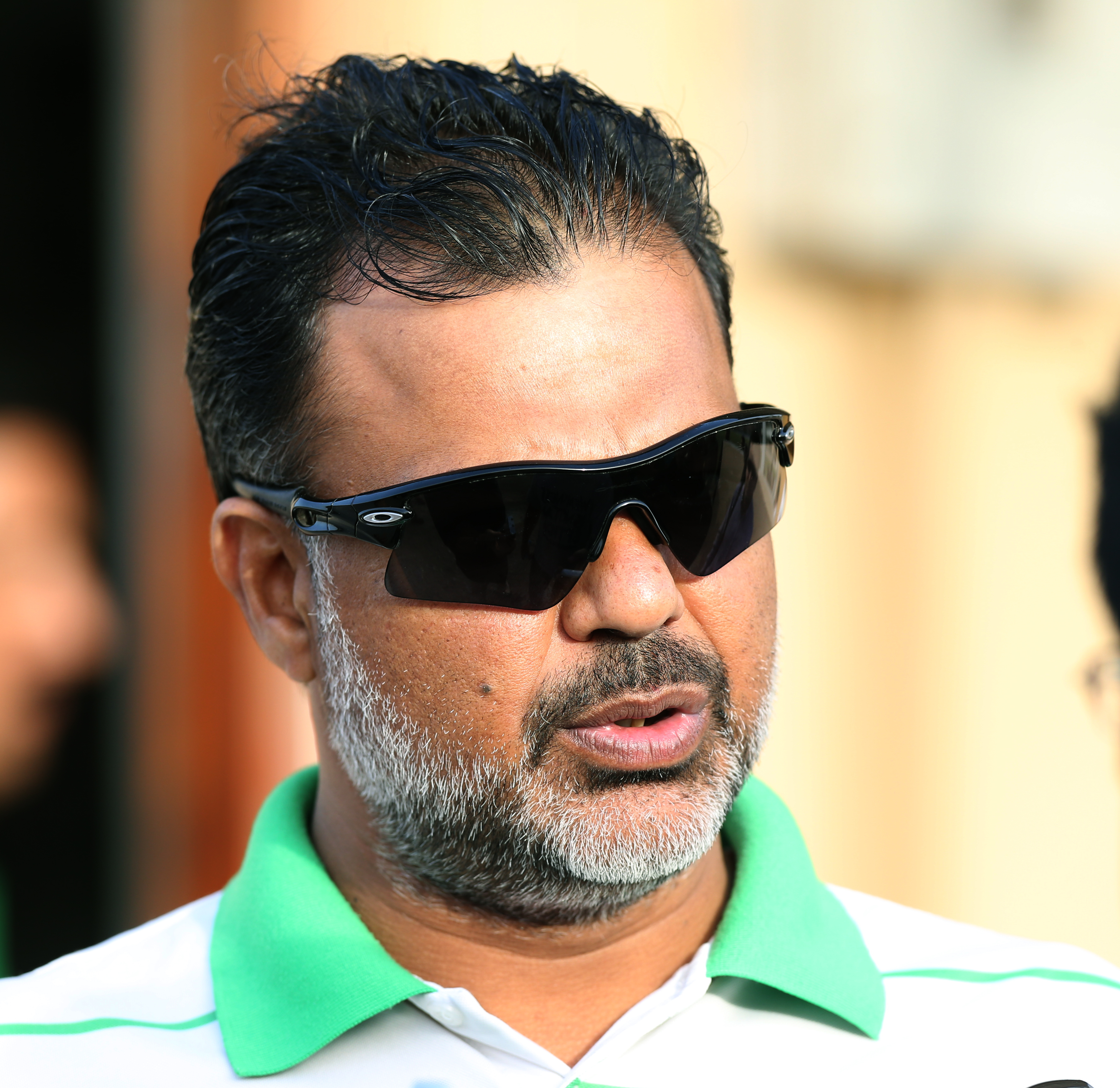
- Ahmed in 2013

Personal information
- Full name: Ijaz Ahmed
- Born: 20 September 1968 (age 58); Sialkot, Punjab, Pakistan
- Height: 5 ft 11 in (180 cm)
- Batting: Right-handed
- Bowling: Left-arm medium
- Role: Batsman
- Relatives: Saleem Malik (brother-in-law)

International information
- National side: Pakistan (1986–2001)
- Test debut (cap 107): 3 February 1987 v India
- Last Test: 27 March 2001 v New Zealand
- ODI debut (cap 60): 14 November 1986 v West Indies
- Last ODI: 11 October 2000 v New Zealand

Domestic team information
- Years: Team
- 1983/84–1985/86: Gujranwala
- 1983/84–1985/86: Pakistan Automobiles Corporation
- 1986/87–2000/01: Habib Bank Limited
- 1991: Durham
- 1992/93–2000/01: Islamabad

Career statistics
| Competition | Test | ODI | FC | LA |
|---|---|---|---|---|
| Matches | 60 | 250 | 169 | 371 |
| Runs scored | 3315 | 6564 | 9,889 | 10,037 |
| Batting average | 37.67 | 32.33 | 38.47 | 33.01 |
| 100s/50s | 12/12 | 10/37 | 26/41 | 16/59 |
| Top score | 211 | 139* | 211 | 139* |
| Balls bowled | 180 | 637 | 2,048 | 1,853 |
| Wickets | 2 | 5 | 34 | 31 |
| Bowling average | 38.50 | 95.20 | 32.29 | 46.80 |
| 5 wickets in innings | 0 | 0 | 1 | 0 |
| 10 wickets in match | 0 | 0 | 0 | 0 |
| Best bowling | 1/9 | 2/31 | 5/95 | 3/46 |
| Catches/stumpings | 45/– | 90/– | 123/– | 135/– |
Medal record
Men's Cricket
Representing Pakistan
ICC Cricket World Cup
| Winner | 1992 Australia and New Zealand |
| Runner-up | 1999 England-Wales -Ireland-Scotland-Netherlands |
- Source: ESPNcricinfo, 4 February 2006

Ijaz Ahmed (Urdu: اعجاز احمد) (born 20 September 1968) is a Pakistani cricket coach and former cricketer who played 60 Test matches and 250 One Day Internationals for Pakistan from 1986 to 2001. He was a part of the Pakistani squad which won the 1992 Cricket World Cup.

== Personal life ==
Born in Sialkot, his family roots lie in the city of Jalandhar (now in Punjab, India) where some of his cousins still live.

He is a brother-in-law of former Pakistan international cricketer and captain Saleem Malik.

== Career ==
Ahmed scored six Test centuries against the world's top-ranked team, Australia – a record number of centuries by a Pakistani against Australia, shared with Javed Miandad. However, 33 of his 92 innings yielded single-figure scores, 54 of them yielded scores below 20.

Ijaz Ahmed came into the national team at the height of the Imran Khan era, and remained on the fringes for nearly a decade, despite several good scores. Dropped after the 1992 World Cup, he came back strongly the following season and established himself at the pivotal "one down" position. He performed poorly at the 1999 World Cup, and the arrival of Younis Khan brought an end to his international career. He formally retired from cricket in 2003.

Ahmed's 250 matches is the seventh-highest of all time in Pakistan, behind Shahid Afridi, Inzamam-ul-Haq, Wasim Akram, Saleem Malik, Younis Khan, Waqar Younis and Shoaib Malik.

A powerful hitter of the ball, Ahmed became the second Pakistani batsman to score 10 ODI centuries. At Lahore, in 1997, Ahmed collapsed the Indian bowling attack by making a quick century off just 68 balls including 9 sixes, remaining not out for 139*; his highest ODI score.

In Test cricket, Ahmed scored 12 Test centuries, including his first and only double century against Sri Lanka, when he scored 211. Ahmed is the top scorer for Pakistan team against South Africa.

On 21 April 1997, in a Test match against Sri Lanka, Ahmed was at the crease on 97, when a run-out attempt brought ambiguity in the decision. However, replays declared Salim Malik as dismissed, and Ahmad was called back to the crease. This was the first time for a batsman to return from the pavilion to the crease since 1987.

=== International centuries ===
Ijaz Ahmed made 22 centuries in international cricket – 12 in Test cricket and 10 in One Day Internationals. He scored his first Test century against Australia at Faisalabad in September 1988, scoring 122. He scored his final Test century, also against Australia at the Perth on in November 1999, scoring 115. His highest Test score is 211, scored against Sri Lanka at Dhaka in 1999.

He scored his first ODI century against Bangladesh at Chittagong, scoring 124*. He scored his final ODI century against England at Sharjah in 1999, scoring 137. His highest ODI score of 139 not out came against India in 1997 at Lahore.

Test centuries
| No. | Score | Against | Pos. | Inn. | Test | Venue | H/A/N | Date | Result | Ref |
|---|---|---|---|---|---|---|---|---|---|---|
| 1 | 122 | Australia | 6 | 1 | 2/3 | Iqbal Stadium, Faisalabad | Home | 23 September 1988 | Drawn | |
| 2 | 121 | Australia | 5 | 4 | 1/3 | Melbourne Cricket Ground, Melbourne | Away | 12 January 1990 | Lost | |
| 3 | 137 | Australia | 3 | 1 | 3/3 | Sydney Cricket Ground, Sydney | Away | 30 November 1995 | Won | |
| 4 | 103 | New Zealand | 3 | 3 | 1/1 | Lancaster Park, Christchurch | Away | 8 December 1995 | Won | |
| 5 | 141 | England | 3 | 1 | 2/3 | Headingley, Leeds | Away | 8 August 1996 | Drawn | |
| 6 | 125 | New Zealand | 3 | 2 | 2/2 | Rawalpindi Cricket Stadium, Rawalpindi | Home | 28 November 1996 | Won | |
| 7 | 113 | Sri Lanka | 3 | 2 | 1/2 | R. Premadasa Stadium, Colombo | Away | 19 April 1997 | Drawn | |
| 8 | 151 | West Indies | 2 | 2 | 3/3 | National Stadium, Karachi | Home | 6 December 1997 | Won | |
| 9 | 155 | Australia | 3 | 2 | 2/3 | Arbab Niaz Stadium, Peshawar | Home | 15 October 1998 | Drawn | |
| 10 | 120 not out | Australia | 3 | 4 | 3/3 | National Stadium, Karachi | Home | 22 October 1998 | Drawn | |
| 11 | 211 | Sri Lanka | 3 | 2 | Final | Bangabandhu National Stadium, Dhaka | Neutral | 12 March 1999 | Won | |
| 12 | 115 | Australia | 3 | 3 | 3/3 | WACA Ground, Perth | Away | 26 November 1999 | Lost | |

ODI centuries
| No. | Score | Against | Pos. | Inn. | SR | Venue | H/A/N | Date | Result | Ref |
|---|---|---|---|---|---|---|---|---|---|---|
| 1 | 124 not out | Bangladesh | 4 | 1 | 142.52 | M. A. Aziz Stadium, Chittagong | Away | 29 October 1988 | Won | |
| 2 | 102 not out | Sri Lanka | 3 | 2 | 102.00 | The Gabba, Brisbane | Neutral | 10 February 1990 | Won | |
| 3 | 110 | South Africa | 5 | 1 | 100.00 | Rawalpindi Cricket Stadium, Rawalpindi | Home | 20 October 1994 | Won | |
| 4 | 114 not out | South Africa | 3 | 2 | 126.66 | Kingsmead, Durban | Away | 17 December 1994 | Won | |
| 5 | 117 | Zimbabwe | 3 | 1 | 111.42 | Arbab Niaz Stadium, Peshawar | Home | 3 November 1996 | Won | |
| 6 | 139 not out | India | 1 | 2 | 165.47 | Gaddafi Stadium, Lahore | Home | 2 October 1997 | Won | |
| 7 | 117 | India | 4 | 1 | 104.46 | Bangabandhu National Stadium, Dhaka | Neutral | 18 January 1998 | Lost | |
| 8 | 111 | Australia | 3 | 1 | 101.83 | Gaddafi Stadium, Lahore | Home | 10 November 1998 | Lost | |
| 9 | 132 | Zimbabwe | 3 | 1 | 128.15 | Rawalpindi Cricket Stadium, Rawalpindi | Home | 24 November 1998 | Won | |
| 10 | 137 | England | 3 | 1 | 105.38 | Sharjah Cricket Stadium, Sharjah | Neutral | 7 April 1999 | Won | |

== Post-retirement ==
=== Coaching career ===
In 2011, the PCB named Ijaz, then a fielding coach, as the national team's batting consultant for the upcoming tour of Zimbabwe. He was later appointed assistant coach of the national team before the upcoming tour of Zimbabwe on request of team management.

Ahmed was appointed as the coach of Pakistan's Under-19 cricket team on 20 October 2019.

He has been the head coach for Lahore Qalandars in the Pakistan Super League.

== Controversies ==
=== Fraud case ===
In 2009, he was jailed for fake issuance of bank cheques. He was remanded for six weeks in jail and later received a bail. In 2012, a local court charged him with forgery.

=== Racism against Pashtuns ===
Ijaz Ahmed was heavily criticized by a large number of former cricket players, and journalists after he made racist remarks about the number of Pashtun players in the Pakistan cricket team, calling them illiterate and accusing them of not being able to handle pressure because of their upbringing on a talk show in ARY channel.
