= List of Australia national cricket captains =

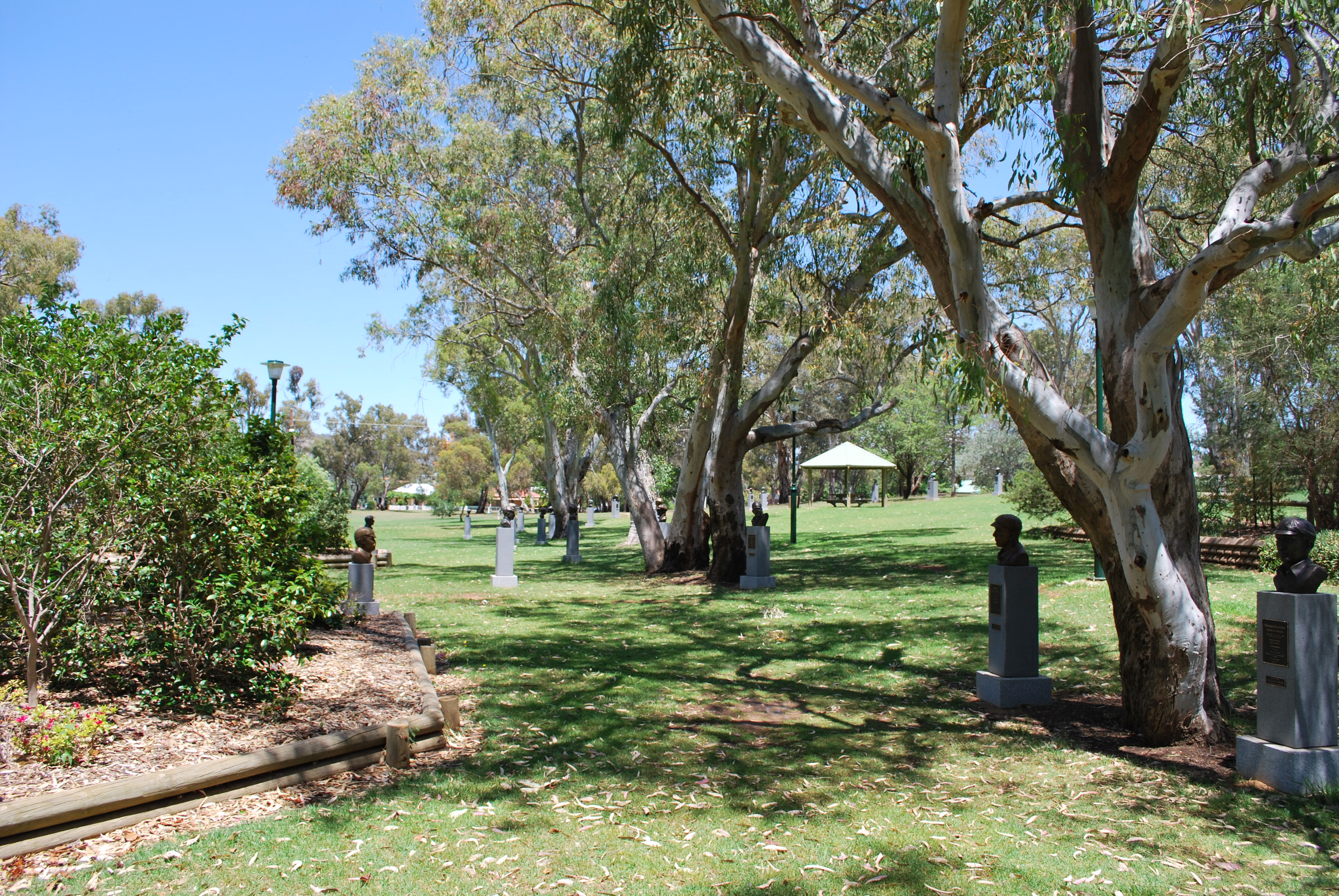
The Cricket Captains' Walk in Cootamundra, New South Wales, is a series of busts representing the captains of the Australian Test cricket team.

This is a list of the people who have been the official Australian captains in Tests, ODIs and Twenty20 Internationals cricket teams.

Australia participated in the first Test match in cricket in 1877, the first One Day International in 1971 (both against England) and the first Twenty20 international in 2005 (against New Zealand). In addition to officially sanctioned international matches and tours organised by the Australian Cricket Board (now known as Cricket Australia), there have been two major rebel Australian teams. In the 1970s many of Australia's leading players signed up for Kerry Packer's World Series Cricket and played in a number of SuperTests against other international teams. Then in the mid-1980s there were two rebel Australian tours to South Africa, which was at that time banned from official competition because of the apartheid regime then in force there. The captains of those Australian teams are also listed below.

== Men's cricket ==
=== Test match captains ===
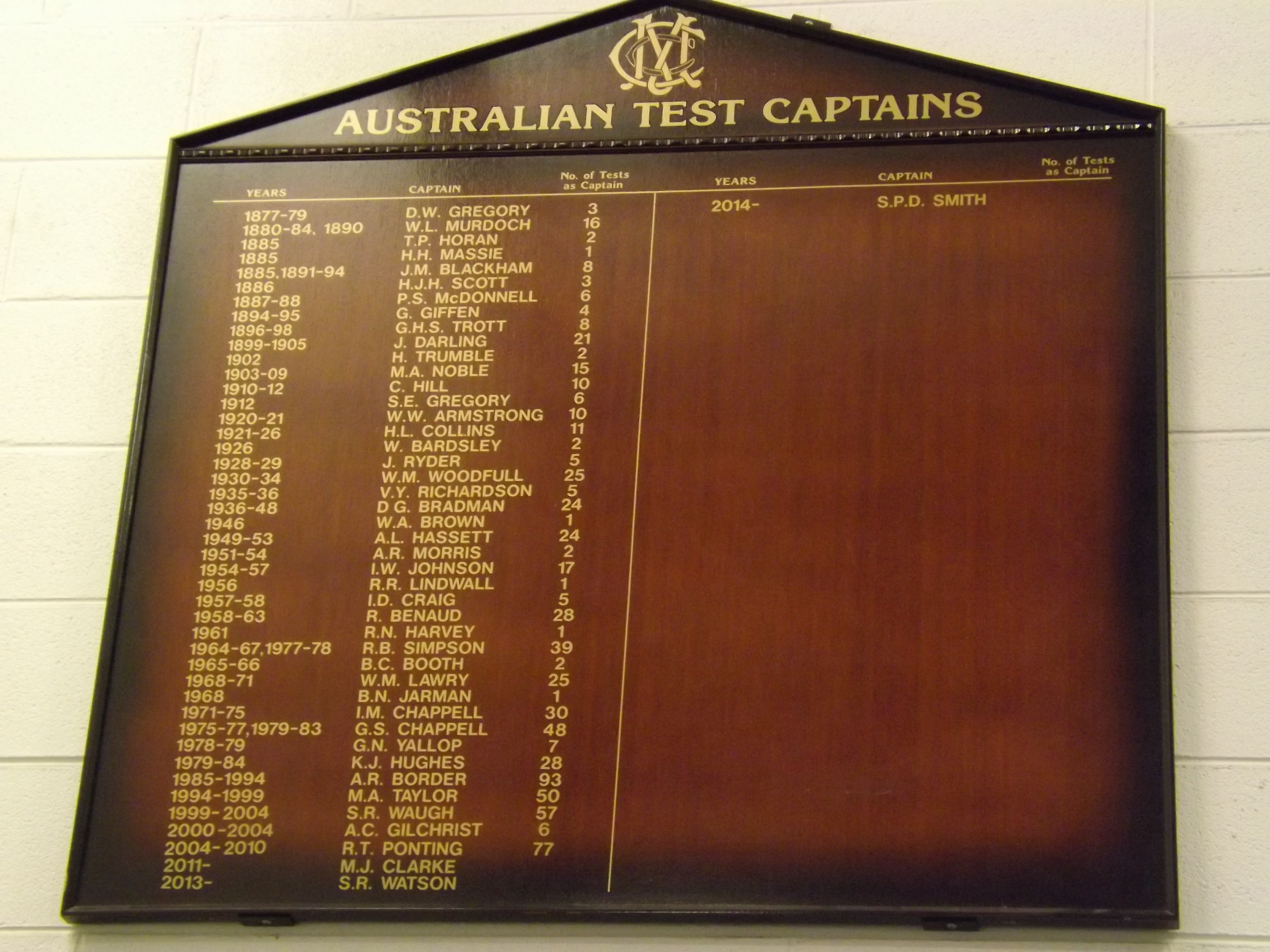
List of Australian test captains, hanging at the MCG

This is a list of cricketers who have captained the Australian cricket team for at least one Test match. It does not include players who have deputised on the field for any period of time during a match where the captain has been unable to play. A dagger (†) next to a Test match series denotes a player who was deputized for the appointed captain for a proportion in a series. The dagger classification follows that adopted by Wisden Cricketers' Almanack.

Australian Test match captains
Number	Player	Year(s)	Opposition	Location	Matches	W	L	D/T
1	Dave Gregory	1876–77	England	Australia	2	1	1	0
1	Dave Gregory	1878–79	England	Australia	1	1	0	0
1	Dave Gregory	Total			3	2	1	0
2	Billy Murdoch	1880	England	England	1	0	1	0
2	Billy Murdoch	1881–82	England	Australia	4	2	0	2
2	Billy Murdoch	1882	England	England	1	1	0	0
2	Billy Murdoch	1882–83	England	Australia	3	1	2	0
2	Billy Murdoch	1882–83	England	Australia	1	1	0	0
2	Billy Murdoch	1884	England	England	3	0	1	2
2	Billy Murdoch	1884–85†	England	Australia	1	0	1	0
2	Billy Murdoch	1890	England	England	2	0	2	0
2	Billy Murdoch	Total			16	5	7	4
3	Tom Horan	1884–85	England	Australia	2	0	2	0
4	Hugh Massie	1884–85†	England	Australia	1	1	0	0
5	Jack Blackham	1884–85†	England	Australia	1	1	0	0
5	Jack Blackham	1891–92	England	Australia	3	2	1	0
5	Jack Blackham	1893	England	England	3	0	1	2
5	Jack Blackham	1894–95†	England	Australia	1	0	1	0
5	Jack Blackham	Total			8	3	3	2
6	Tup Scott	1886	England	England	3	0	3	0
7	Percy McDonnell	1886–87	England	Australia	2	0	2	0
7	Percy McDonnell	1887–88	England	Australia	1	0	1	0
7	Percy McDonnell	1888	England	England	3	1	2	0
7	Percy McDonnell	Total			6	1	5	0
8	George Giffen	1894–95	England	Australia	4	2	2	0
9	Harry Trott	1896	England	England	3	1	2	0
9	Harry Trott	1897–98	England	Australia	5	4	1	0
9	Harry Trott	Total			8	5	3	0
10	Joe Darling	1899	England	England	5	1	0	4
10	Joe Darling	1901–02	England	Australia	3	2	1	0
10	Joe Darling	1902	England	England	5	2	1	2
10	Joe Darling	1902–03	South Africa	South Africa	3	2	0	1
10	Joe Darling	1905	England	England	5	0	2	3
10	Joe Darling	Total			21	7	4	10
11	Hugh Trumble	1901–02†	England	Australia	2	2	0	0
12	Monty Noble	1903–04	England	Australia	5	2	3	0
12	Monty Noble	1907–08	England	Australia	5	4	1	0
12	Monty Noble	1909	England	England	5	2	1	2
12	Monty Noble	Total			15	8	5	2
13	Clem Hill	1910–11	South Africa	Australia	5	4	1	0
13	Clem Hill	1911–12	England	Australia	5	1	4	0
13	Clem Hill	Total			10	5	5	0
14	Syd Gregory	1912 (Note: In 1945, just after the Second World War had ended in Europe, Warrant Officer Lindsay Hassett (as he then was) captained the Australian Services in five "Victory Tests" against England. The series was tied two-all with one draw. The "Victory Tests" have not, however, been granted full Test status.)	South Africa	England	3	2	1	0
14	Syd Gregory	1912	England	England	3	0	1	2
14	Syd Gregory	Total			6	2	2	2
15	Warwick Armstrong	1920–21	England	Australia	5	5	0	0
15	Warwick Armstrong	1921	England	England	5	3	0	2
15	Warwick Armstrong	Total			10	8	0	2
16	Herbie Collins	1921–22	South Africa	South Africa	3	1	0	2
16	Herbie Collins	1924–25	England	Australia	5	4	1	0
16	Herbie Collins	1926	England	England	3	0	1	2
16	Herbie Collins	Total			11	5	2	4
17	Warren Bardsley	1926†	England	England	2	0	0	2
18	Jack Ryder	1928–29	England	Australia	5	1	4	0
19	Bill Woodfull	1930	England	England	5	2	1	2
19	Bill Woodfull	1930–31	West Indies	Australia	5	4	1	0
19	Bill Woodfull	1931–32	South Africa	Australia	5	5	0	0
19	Bill Woodfull	1932–33	England	Australia	5	1	4	0
19	Bill Woodfull	1934	England	England	5	2	1	2
19	Bill Woodfull	Total			25	14	7	4
20	Vic Richardson	1935–36	South Africa	South Africa	5	4	0	1
21	Don Bradman	1936–37	England	Australia	5	3	2	0
21	Don Bradman	1938	England	England	4	1	1	2
21	Don Bradman	1946–47	England	Australia	5	3	0	2
21	Don Bradman	1947–48	India	Australia	5	4	0	1
21	Don Bradman	1948	England	England	5	4	0	1
21	Don Bradman	Total			24	15	3	6
22	Bill Brown	1945–46	New Zealand	New Zealand	1	1	0	0
23	Lindsay Hassett	1949–50	South Africa	South Africa	5	4	0	1
23	Lindsay Hassett	1950–51	England	Australia	5	4	1	0
23	Lindsay Hassett	1951–52	West Indies	Australia	4	4	0	0
23	Lindsay Hassett	1952–53	South Africa	Australia	5	2	2	1
23	Lindsay Hassett	1953	England	England	5	0	1	4
23	Lindsay Hassett	Total			24	14	4	6
24	Arthur Morris	1951–52†	West Indies	Australia	1	0	1	0
24	Arthur Morris	1954–55†	England	Australia	1	0	1	0
24	Arthur Morris	Total			2	0	2	0
25	Ian Johnson	1954–55	England	Australia	4	1	2	1
25	Ian Johnson	1954–55	West Indies	West Indies	5	3	0	2
25	Ian Johnson	1956	England	England	5	1	2	2
25	Ian Johnson	1956–57	Pakistan	Pakistan	1	0	1	0
25	Ian Johnson	1956–57	India	India	2	2	0	0
25	Ian Johnson	Total			17	7	5	5
26	Ray Lindwall	1956–57†	India	India	1	0	0	1
27	Ian Craig	1957–58	South Africa	South Africa	5	3	0	2
28	Richie Benaud |	1958–59	England	Australia	5	4	0	1
28	Richie Benaud |	1959–60	Pakistan	Pakistan	3	2	0	1
28	Richie Benaud |	1959–60	India	India	5	2	1	2
28	Richie Benaud |	1960–61	West Indies	Australia	5	2	1	2 (Note: Includes one tied match.)
28	Richie Benaud |	1961	England	England	4	1	1	2
28	Richie Benaud |	1962–63	England	Australia	5	1	1	3
28	Richie Benaud |	1963–64†	South Africa	Australia	1	0	0	1
28	Richie Benaud |	Total			28	12	4	12
29	Neil Harvey	1961†	England	England	1	1	0	0
30	Bob Simpson	1963–64	South Africa	Australia	4	1	1	2
30	Bob Simpson	1964	England	England	5	1	0	4
30	Bob Simpson	1964–65	India	India	3	1	1	1
30	Bob Simpson	1964–65	Pakistan	Pakistan	1	0	0	1
30	Bob Simpson	1964–65	Pakistan	Australia	1	0	0	1
30	Bob Simpson	1964–65	West Indies	West Indies	5	1	2	2
30	Bob Simpson	1965–66	England	Australia	3	1	0	2
30	Bob Simpson	1966–67	South Africa	South Africa	5	1	3	1
30	Bob Simpson	1967–68	India	Australia	2	2	0	0
30	Bob Simpson	1977–78	India	Australia	5	3	2	0
30	Bob Simpson	1977–78	West Indies	West Indies	5	1	3	1
30	Bob Simpson	Total			39	12	12	15
31	Brian Booth	1965–66†	England	Australia	2	0	1	1
32	Bill Lawry	1967–68†	India	Australia	2	2	0	0
32	Bill Lawry	1968	England	England	4	1	1	2
32	Bill Lawry	1968–69	West Indies	Australia	5	3	1	1
32	Bill Lawry	1969–70	India	India	5	3	1	1
32	Bill Lawry	1969–70	South Africa	South Africa	4	0	4	0
32	Bill Lawry	1970–71	England	Australia	5	0	1	4
32	Bill Lawry	Total			25	9	8	8
33	Barry Jarman	1968†	England	England	1	0	0	1
34	Ian Chappell (Note: In 1971–72, the planned tour to Australia by South Africa was cancelled. A Rest of the World XI toured Australia in its place and played five "Tests". Ian Chappell captained Australia in all of them. The World XI won two "Tests", Australia one, with two being drawn. The matches have retrospectively been denied Test status.)	1970–71†	England	Australia	1	0	1	0
34	Ian Chappell	1972	England	England	5	2	2	1
34	Ian Chappell	1972–73	Pakistan	Australia	3	3	0	0
34	Ian Chappell	1972–73	West Indies	West Indies	5	2	0	3
34	Ian Chappell	1973–74	New Zealand	Australia	3	2	0	1
34	Ian Chappell	1973–74	New Zealand	New Zealand	3	1	1	1
34	Ian Chappell	1974–75	England	Australia	6	4	1	1
34	Ian Chappell	1975	England	England	4	1	0	3
34	Ian Chappell	Total			30	15	5	10
35	Greg Chappell	1975–76	West Indies	Australia	6	5	1	0
35	Greg Chappell	1976–77	Pakistan	Australia	3	1	1	1
35	Greg Chappell	1976–77	New Zealand	New Zealand	2	1	0	1
35	Greg Chappell	1976–77	England	Australia	1	1	0	0
35	Greg Chappell	1977	England	England	5	0	3	2
35	Greg Chappell	1979–80	West Indies	Australia	3	0	2	1
35	Greg Chappell	1979–80	England	Australia	3	3	0	0
35	Greg Chappell	1979–80	Pakistan	Pakistan	3	0	1	2
35	Greg Chappell	1980	England	England	1	0	0	1
35	Greg Chappell	1980–81	New Zealand	Australia	3	2	0	1
35	Greg Chappell	1980–81	India	Australia	3	1	1	1
35	Greg Chappell	1981–82	Pakistan	Australia	3	2	1	0
35	Greg Chappell	1981–82	West Indies	Australia	3	1	1	1
35	Greg Chappell	1981–82	New Zealand	New Zealand	3	1	1	1
35	Greg Chappell	1982–83	England	Australia	5	2	1	2
35	Greg Chappell	1982–83	Sri Lanka	Sri Lanka	1	1	0	0
35	Greg Chappell	Total			48	21	13	14
36	Graham Yallop	1978–79	England	Australia	6	1	5	0
36	Graham Yallop	1978–79	Pakistan	Australia	1	0	1	0
36	Graham Yallop	Total			7	1	6	0
37	Kim Hughes	1978–79†	Pakistan	Australia	1	1	0	0
37	Kim Hughes	1979–80	India	India	6	0	2	4
37	Kim Hughes	1981	England	England	6	1	3	2
37	Kim Hughes	1982–83	Pakistan	Pakistan	3	0	3	0
37	Kim Hughes	1983–84	Pakistan	Australia	5	2	0	3
37	Kim Hughes	1983–84	West Indies	West Indies	5	0	3	2
37	Kim Hughes	1984–85†	West Indies	Australia	2	0	2	0
37	Kim Hughes	Total			28	4	13	11
38	Allan Border	1984–85	West Indies	Australia	3	1	1	1
38	Allan Border	1985	England	England	6	1	3	2
38	Allan Border	1985–86	New Zealand	Australia	3	1	2	0
38	Allan Border	1985–86	India	Australia	3	0	0	3
38	Allan Border	1985–86	New Zealand	New Zealand	3	0	1	2
38	Allan Border	1986–87	India	India	3	0	0	3
38	Allan Border	1986–87	England	Australia	5	1	2	2
38	Allan Border	1987–88	New Zealand	Australia	3	1	0	2
38	Allan Border	1987–88	England	Australia	1	0	0	1
38	Allan Border	1987–88	Sri Lanka	Australia	1	1	0	0
38	Allan Border	1988–89	Pakistan	Pakistan	3	0	1	2
38	Allan Border	1988–89	West Indies	Australia	5	1	3	1
38	Allan Border	1989	England	England	6	4	0	2
38	Allan Border	1989–90	New Zealand	Australia	1	0	0	1
38	Allan Border	1989–90	Sri Lanka	Australia	2	1	0	1
38	Allan Border	1989–90	Pakistan	Australia	3	1	0	2
38	Allan Border	1989–90	New Zealand	New Zealand	1	0	1	0
38	Allan Border	1990–91	England	Australia	5	3	0	2
38	Allan Border	1990–91	West Indies	West Indies	5	1	2	2
38	Allan Border	1991–92	India	Australia	5	4	0	1
38	Allan Border	1992	Sri Lanka	Sri Lanka	3	1	0	2
38	Allan Border	1992–93	West Indies	Australia	5	1	2	2
38	Allan Border	1992–93	New Zealand	New Zealand	3	1	1	1
38	Allan Border	1993	England	England	6	4	1	1
38	Allan Border	1993–94	New Zealand	Australia	3	2	0	1
38	Allan Border	1993–94	South Africa	Australia	3	1	1	1
38	Allan Border	1993–94	South Africa	South Africa	3	1	1	1
38	Allan Border	Total			93	32	22	39
39	Mark Taylor	1994–95	Pakistan	Pakistan	3	0	1	2
39	Mark Taylor	1994–95	England	Australia	5	3	1	1
39	Mark Taylor	1994–95	West Indies	West Indies	4	2	1	1
39	Mark Taylor	1995–96	Pakistan	Australia	3	2	1	0
39	Mark Taylor	1995–96	Sri Lanka	Australia	3	3	0	0
39	Mark Taylor	1996–97	India	India	1	0	1	0
39	Mark Taylor	1996–97	West Indies	Australia	5	3	2	0
39	Mark Taylor	1996–97	South Africa	South Africa	3	2	1	0
39	Mark Taylor	1997	England	England	6	3	2	1
39	Mark Taylor	1997–98	New Zealand	Australia	3	2	0	1
39	Mark Taylor	1997–98	South Africa	Australia	3	1	0	2
39	Mark Taylor	1997–98	India	India	3	1	2	0
39	Mark Taylor	1998–99	Pakistan	Pakistan	3	1	0	2
39	Mark Taylor	1998–99	England	Australia	5	3	1	1
39	Mark Taylor	Total			50	26	13	11
40	Steve Waugh	1998–99	West Indies	West Indies	4	2	2	0
40	Steve Waugh	1999	Sri Lanka	Sri Lanka	3	0	1	2
40	Steve Waugh	1999–2000	Zimbabwe	Zimbabwe	1	1	0	0
40	Steve Waugh	1999–2000	Pakistan	Australia	3	3	0	0
40	Steve Waugh	1999–2000	India	Australia	3	3	0	0
40	Steve Waugh	1999–2000	New Zealand	New Zealand	3	3	0	0
40	Steve Waugh	2000–01	West Indies	Australia	5	5	0	0
40	Steve Waugh	2000–01	India	India	3	1	2	0
40	Steve Waugh	2001	England	England	4	4	0	0
40	Steve Waugh	2001–02	New Zealand	Australia	3	0	0	3
40	Steve Waugh	2001–02	South Africa	Australia	3	3	0	0
40	Steve Waugh	2001–02	South Africa	South Africa	3	2	1	0
40	Steve Waugh	2002–03	Pakistan	Sri Lanka and United Arab Emirates	3	3	0	0
40	Steve Waugh	2002–03	England	Australia	5	4	1	0
40	Steve Waugh	2003	West Indies	West Indies	4	3	1	0
40	Steve Waugh	2003	Bangladesh	Australia	2	2	0	0
40	Steve Waugh	2003–04	Zimbabwe	Australia	2	2	0	0
40	Steve Waugh	2003–04	India	Australia	4	1	1	2
40	Steve Waugh	Total			57	41	9	7
41	Adam Gilchrist	2000–01†	West Indies	Australia	1	1	0	0
41	Adam Gilchrist	2001†	England	England	1	0	1	0
41	Adam Gilchrist	2004†	Sri Lanka	Australia	1	1	0	0
41	Adam Gilchrist	2004–05	India	India	3	2	0	1
41	Adam Gilchrist	Total			6	4	1	1
42	Ricky Ponting	2003–04	Sri Lanka	Sri Lanka	3	3	0	0
42	Ricky Ponting	2004	Sri Lanka	Australia	1	0	0	1
42	Ricky Ponting	2004–05†	India	India	1	0	1	0
42	Ricky Ponting	2004–05	New Zealand	Australia	2	2	0	0
42	Ricky Ponting	2004–05	Pakistan	Australia	3	3	0	0
42	Ricky Ponting	2004–05	New Zealand	New Zealand	3	2	0	1
42	Ricky Ponting	2005	England	England	5	1	2	2
42	Ricky Ponting	2005–06	World XI	Australia	1	1	0	0
42	Ricky Ponting	2005–06	West Indies	Australia	3	3	0	0
42	Ricky Ponting	2005–06	South Africa	Australia	3	2	0	1
42	Ricky Ponting	2005–06	South Africa	South Africa	3	3	0	0
42	Ricky Ponting	2005–06	Bangladesh	Bangladesh	2	2	0	0
42	Ricky Ponting	2006–07	England	Australia	5	5	0	0
42	Ricky Ponting	2007–08	Sri Lanka	Australia	2	2	0	0
42	Ricky Ponting	2007–08	India	Australia	4	2	1	1
42	Ricky Ponting	2008	West Indies	West Indies	3	2	0	1
42	Ricky Ponting	2008–09	India	India	4	0	2	2
42	Ricky Ponting	2008–09	New Zealand	Australia	2	2	0	0
42	Ricky Ponting	2008–09	South Africa	Australia	3	1	2	0
42	Ricky Ponting	2008–09	South Africa	South Africa	3	2	1	0
42	Ricky Ponting	2009	England	England	5	1	2	2
42	Ricky Ponting	2009–10	West Indies	Australia	3	2	0	1
42	Ricky Ponting	2009–10	Pakistan	Australia	3	3	0	0
42	Ricky Ponting	2009–10	New Zealand	New Zealand	2	2	0	0
42	Ricky Ponting	2010	Pakistan	England	2	1	1	0
42	Ricky Ponting	2010–11	India	India	2	0	2	0
42	Ricky Ponting	2010–11	England	Australia	4	1	2	1
42	Ricky Ponting	Total			77	48	16	13
43	Michael Clarke	2010–11†	England	Australia	1	0	1	0
43	Michael Clarke	2011	Sri Lanka	Sri Lanka	3	1	0	2
43	Michael Clarke	2011–12	South Africa	South Africa	2	1	1	0
43	Michael Clarke	2011–12	New Zealand	Australia	2	1	1	0
43	Michael Clarke	2011–12	India	Australia	4	4	0	0
43	Michael Clarke	2011–12	West Indies	West Indies	3	2	0	1
43	Michael Clarke	2012–13	South Africa	Australia	3	0	1	2
43	Michael Clarke	2012–13	Sri Lanka	Australia	3	3	0	0
43	Michael Clarke	2012–13	India	India	3	0	3	0
43	Michael Clarke	2013	England	England	5	0	3	2
43	Michael Clarke	2013–14	England	Australia	5	5	0	0
43	Michael Clarke	2013–14	South Africa	South Africa	3	2	1	0
43	Michael Clarke	2014–15	Pakistan	United Arab Emirates	2	0	2	0
43	Michael Clarke	2014–15	India	Australia	1	1	0	0
43	Michael Clarke	2015	West Indies	West Indies	2	2	0	0
43	Michael Clarke	2015	England	England	5	2	3	0
43	Michael Clarke	Total			47	24	16	7
44	Shane Watson	2012–13†	India	India	1	0	1	0
45	Steve Smith	2014–15†	India	Australia	3	1	0	2
45	Steve Smith	2015–16	New Zealand	Australia	3	2	0	1
45	Steve Smith	2015–16	West Indies	Australia	3	2	0	1
45	Steve Smith	2015–16	New Zealand	New Zealand	2	2	0	0
45	Steve Smith	2016	Sri Lanka	Sri Lanka	3	0	3	0
45	Steve Smith	2016–17	South Africa	Australia	3	1	2	0
45	Steve Smith	2016–17	Pakistan	Australia	3	3	0	0
45	Steve Smith	2016–17	India	India	4	1	2	1
45	Steve Smith	2017	Bangladesh	Bangladesh	2	1	1	0
45	Steve Smith	2017–18	England	Australia	5	4	0	1
45	Steve Smith	2017–18 (Note: Steve Smith was removed as Australian captain during the third Test of the 2017–18 tour of South Africa due to a ball-tampering scandal. His vice-captain, David Warner was also stood down. Tim Paine acted as Australian captain for the remainder of the Test match. Smith and Warner were subsequently suspended following an investigation, and Paine was confirmed as captain for the Fourth (and final) Test.)	South Africa	South Africa	3	1	2	0
45	Steve Smith	2021–22† (Note: Pat Cummins was withdrawn from the Test squad after being deemed a close contact of a person who received a positive COVID-19 test. Vice-captain Steve Smith acted as Australian captain in his place.)	England	Australia	1	1	0	0
45	Steve Smith	2022–23†	West Indies	Australia	1	1	0	0
45	Steve Smith	2022–23†	India	India	2	1	0	1
45	Steve Smith	2024–25	Sri Lanka	Sri Lanka	2	2	0	0
45	Steve Smith	2025–26†	England	Australia	4	3	1	0
45	Steve Smith	Total			44	26	11	7
46	Tim Paine	2017–18†	South Africa	South Africa	1	0	1	0
46	Tim Paine	2018–19	Pakistan	United Arab Emirates	2	0	1	1
46	Tim Paine	2018–19	India	Australia	4	1	2	1
46	Tim Paine	2018–19	Sri Lanka	Australia	2	2	0	0
46	Tim Paine	2019	England	England	5	2	2	1
46	Tim Paine	2019–20	Pakistan	Australia	2	2	0	0
46	Tim Paine	2019–20	New Zealand	Australia	3	3	0	0
46	Tim Paine	2020–21	India	Australia	4	1	2	1
46	Tim Paine	Total			23	11	8	4
47	Pat Cummins	2021–22	England	Australia	4	3	0	1
47	Pat Cummins	2021–22	Pakistan	Pakistan	3	1	0	2
47	Pat Cummins	2022	Sri Lanka	Sri Lanka	2	1	1	0
47	Pat Cummins	2022–23	West Indies	Australia	1	1	0	0
47	Pat Cummins	2022–23	South Africa	Australia	3	2	0	1
47	Pat Cummins	2022–23	India	India	2	0	2	0
47	Pat Cummins	2023 (WTC Final)	India	England	1	1	0	0
47	Pat Cummins	2023	England	England	5	2	2	1
47	Pat Cummins	2023–24	Pakistan	Australia	3	3	0	0
47	Pat Cummins	2023–24	West Indies	Australia	2	1	1	0
47	Pat Cummins	2024	New Zealand	New Zealand	2	2	0	0
47	Pat Cummins	2024–25	India	Australia	5	3	1	1
47	Pat Cummins	2025 (WTC Final)	South Africa	England	1	0	1	0
47	Pat Cummins	2025	West Indies	West Indies	3	3	0	0
47	Pat Cummins	2025–26	England	Australia	1	1	0	0
47	Pat Cummins	2026	Bangalesh	Australia	2	1	1	0
47	Pat Cummins	2026	South Africa	South Africa	3	1	2	0
47	Pat Cummins	Total			43	26	11	6
Grand total					887	428	238	221

Last updated: 13 November 2026

=== Test match vice-captains ===
A number of players have served as vice-captain(s) in the Test team including:

- Bill Woodfull – under Jack Ryder from October 1928 to March 1929, then promoted to captain
- Vic Richardson – under Bill Woodfull from December 1932 to June 1934, when he was unavailable for selection
- Don Bradman – under Bill Woodfull from June to August 1934, when he was unavailable for selection
- Stan McCabe – under Vic Richardson from August 1934 to December 1936
- Stan McCabe – retained the position under Don Bradman from December 1936 to August 1938, when he retired
- Lindsay Hassett – under Don Bradman from November 1946 to August 1948, then promoted to captain
- Arthur Morris – under Lindsay Hassett from December 1949 to November 1954
- Arthur Morris – retained the position under Ian Johnson from November to December 1954 to March 1955, when he was made to step aside for Keith Miller
- Richie Benaud – under Arthur Morris for one Test in December 1954, when Johnson was injured
- Arthur Morris – resumed the position under Ian Johnson from December 1954 to March 1955, when he was made to step aside for Keith Miller
- Keith Miller – under Ian Johnson from March 1955 to 1956, when he retired
- Neil Harvey – under Ian Craig in 1957–58 vs South Africa
- Neil Harvey – retained the position under Richie Benaud from December 1958 to February 1963, deputised as captain for one Test and later retired
- Bob Simpson – under Richie Benaud for one Test in December 1963, then promoted to captain
- Brian Booth – under Bob Simpson from January 1964 to January 1966, deputised as captain for two Tests and then dropped
- Bill Lawry – under Bob Simpson from January 1966 to January 1968, then promoted to captain
- Barry Jarman – under Bill Lawry from 1968 to January 1969, when he retired
- Ian Chappell – under Bill Lawry from February 1969 to February 1971, then promoted to captain
- Keith Stackpole – under Ian Chappell from June to August 1972,
- Ian Redpath – under Ian Chappell from December 1972 to October 1975
- Ian Redpath – retained the position under Greg Chappell from October 1975 to February 1976, when he retired
- David Hookes – under Greg Chappell from December 1976 to June 1977, when he was made to step aside for Rod Marsh
- Rod Marsh – under Greg Chappell from June to August 1977, then left to join World Series Cricket
- Craig Serjeant – under Bob Simpson from December 1977 to January 1978, when he was dropped
- Graham Yallop – under Bob Simpson from January to February 1978, when he was dropped
- Jeff Thomson – under Bob Simpson from February to May 1978, then left to join World Series Cricket
- Gary Cosier – under Graham Yallop from November to December 1978, when he was dropped
- John Maclean – under Graham Yallop from December 1978 to January 1979, when he was dropped
- Andrew Hilditch – under Graham Yallop from March to September 1979
- Andrew Hilditch – retained the position under Kim Hughes from September to November 1979, when he was dropped
- Kim Hughes – under Greg Chappell from November 1979 to June 1981, then stood in as captain when Chappell was unavailable for selection
- Rod Marsh – resumed the position under Kim Hughes from June to September 1981, when he was made to step aside for Kim Hughes
- Kim Hughes – resumed the position under Greg Chappell from November 1981 to March 1982, then stood in as captain when Chappell was unavailable for selection
- Allan Border – under Kim Hughes from March to October 1982, when he was made to step aside for Kim Hughes
- Kim Hughes – resumed the position under Greg Chappell from October 1982 to April 1983, when he was unavailable for selection
- David Hookes – resumed the position under Greg Chappell from April to November 1983, when he was dropped
- Greg Chappell – resumed the position under Kim Hughes from November 1983 to January 1984, when he retired
- Allan Border – resumed the position under Kim Hughes from March to December 1984, then promoted to captain
- Rodney Hogg – under Allan Border in December 1984, when he was injured
- Andrew Hilditch – resumed the position under Allan Border from December 1984 to, when he was made to step aside for Graeme Wood
- Graeme Wood – under Allan Border for one Test in June 1985, when he was made to step aside for Andrew Hilditch
- Andrew Hilditch – resumed the position under Allan Border from June to November 1985, when he was dropped
- David Hookes – under Allan Border from November to December 1985, when he was dropped
- Ray Bright – under Allan Border from January to October 1986, when he was made to step aside for David Boon
- David Boon – under Allan Border from September to December 1986, when he was dropped
- Geoff Marsh – under Allan Border from January 1987 to January 1992, when he was dropped
- Mark Taylor – under Allan Border from February 1992 to April 1994, dropped and injured once respectively, re-selected and later promoted to captain
- Ian Healy – under Mark Taylor from April 1994 to March 1997, when he was sacked from the position
- Steve Waugh – under Mark Taylor from March 1997 to February 1999, then promoted to captain
- Shane Warne – under Steve Waugh from February 1999 to April 1999, when he was dropped
- Mark Waugh – under Steve Waugh for one Test in April 1999, when Shane Warne was dropped
- Shane Warne – resumed the position under Steve Waugh from July 1999 to August 2000, when he was sacked from the position
- Adam Gilchrist – under Steve Waugh from August to December 2000, then stood in as captain when Waugh was injured
- Ricky Ponting – under Adam Gilchrist (when Steve Waugh was injured) for one Test in December 2000
- Adam Gilchrist – resumed the position under Steve Waugh from December 2000 to August 2001, then stood in as captain when Waugh was injured
- Ricky Ponting – resumed the position under Adam Gilchrist (when Steve Waugh was injured) for one Test in August 2001
- Adam Gilchrist – resumed the position under Steve Waugh from August 2001 to April 2003, when he was made to step aside for Ricky Ponting
- Ricky Ponting – resumed the position under Steve Waugh from April 2003 to March 2004, then promoted to captain
- Adam Gilchrist – resumed the position under Ricky Ponting from March to October 2004, then stood in as captain when Ponting was injured
- Matthew Hayden – under Adam Gilchrist (when Ricky Ponting was injured) for three Tests in October 2004
- Adam Gilchrist – resumed the position under Ricky Ponting from November 2004 to January 2008, when he retired
- Michael Hussey – under Ricky Ponting for one Test in May 2008, when Michael Clarke was injured
- Michael Clarke – under Ricky Ponting from May 2008 to March 2011, then promoted to captain
- Shane Watson – under Michael Clarke, from March 2011 to April 2013, deputised as captain for one Test and later resigned from the position
- Brad Haddin – under Michael Clarke from April 2013 to December 2014
- Brad Haddin – retained the position under Steve Smith (when Michael Clarke was injured) from December 2014 to January 2015, when he was made to step aside for Steve Smith
- Steve Smith – under Michael Clarke from January 2015 to August 2015, then promoted to captain
- David Warner – under Steve Smith from August 2015 to March 2018, when he stood down following a ball-tampering scandal
- Josh Hazlewood (jointly with Mitchell Marsh) – under Tim Paine from September 2018 to January 2019, when he was injured
- Mitchell Marsh (jointly with Josh Hazlewood) – under Tim Paine from September 2018 to January 2019, when he was dropped
- Travis Head (jointly with Pat Cummins) – under Tim Paine from January 2019 to November 2020, dropped at one point, re-selected and later sacked from the position
- Pat Cummins (jointly with Travis Head until November 2020) – under Tim Paine from January 2019 to November 2021, then promoted to captain
- Steve Smith – resumed the position under Pat Cummins from November to December 2021, then stood in as captain when Cummins was unavailable for selection
- Travis Head – resumed the position under Steve Smith (when Pat Cummins was unavailable) for one Test in December 2021
- Steve Smith – resumed the position under Pat Cummins from December 2021 to December 2022, then stood in as captain when Cummins was injured
- Alex Carey – under Steve Smith (when Pat Cummins was injured) for one Test in December 2022
- Steve Smith – resumed the position under Pat Cummins from December 2022 to March 2023, then stood in as captain when Cummins was unavailable
- Alex Carey – resumed the position under Steve Smith (when Pat Cummins was unavailable) in March 2023
- Steve Smith (jointly with Travis Head from December 2023) – resumed the position under Pat Cummins from March 2023 to February 2025, then stood in as captain when Cummins was unavailable for selection
- Travis Head (jointly with Steve Smith since December 2023) – resumed the position under Pat Cummins and Steve Smith (when Pat Cummins was unavailable) since December 2023

=== One Day International captains ===
This is a list of cricketers who have captained the Australia national cricket team for at least one One Day International (ODI).

Australian One Day International captains
Number	Player	Year(s)	Matches	W	L	T	NR	Winning rate
1	Bill Lawry	1971	1	1	0	0	0	100.00%
2	Ian Chappell (Note: Ian Chappell also captained the Australians against a Rest of the World XI in three one-day matches in 1971/2. The series was tied one-all, with one match abandoned without a ball being bowled. These games are not recognised as official ODIs.)	1972–1975	11	6	5	0	0	54.55%
3	Greg Chappell	1975–1983	49	21	25	0	3	42.85%
4	Bob Simpson	1978	2	1	1	0	0	50.00%
5	Graham Yallop	1979	4	2	1	0	1	50.00%
6	Kim Hughes	1979–1984	49	21	23	1	4	42.85%
7	David Hookes	1983	1	0	1	0	0	0.00%
8	Allan Border	1985–1994	178	107	67	1	3	60.11%
9	Ray Bright	1986	1	0	1	0	0	0.00%
10	Geoff Marsh	1987–1991	4	3	1	0	0	75.00%
11	Mark Taylor	1992–1997	67	36	30	1	0	53.73%
12	Ian Healy	1996–1997	8	5	3	0	0	62.50%
13	Steve Waugh	1997–2002	106	67	35	3	1	63.20%
14	Shane Warne	1998–1999	11	10	1	0	0	90.90%
15	Adam Gilchrist	2001–2007	17	12	4	0	1	70.58%
16	Ricky Ponting (Note: Ricky Ponting also captained the ICC World XI in the first ODI played as part of the World Cricket Tsunami Appeal.)	2002–2012	229	164	51	2	12	71.61%
17	Michael Hussey	2006–2007	4	0	4	0	0	0.00%
18	Michael Clarke	2008–2015	74	50	21	0	3	67.56%
19	Cameron White	2011	1	1	0	0	0	100.00%
20	Shane Watson	2012–2013	9	5	3	1	0	55.55%
21	George Bailey	2013–2015	29	16	10	0	3	55.17%
22	Steve Smith	2015–2025	64	32	28	0	4	50.00%
23	David Warner	2016	3	3	0	0	0	100.00%
24	Aaron Finch	2017–2022	55	31	24	0	0	56.36%
25	Tim Paine	2018	5	0	5	0	0	0.00%
26	Alex Carey	2021	3	2	1	0	0	66.67%
27	Pat Cummins	2022–2024	17	13	4	0	0	76.47%
28	Josh Hazlewood	2022	1	1	0	0	0	100.00%
29	Mitchell Marsh	2023–present	21	11	10	0	0	52.38%
30	Josh Inglis	2024-2026	7	2	5	0	0	28.57%
Grand total			1031	623	364	9	35	60.43%

Statistics are correct as of 13 November 2026.

=== Twenty20 International captains ===
Ricky Ponting was Australia's first captain in Twenty20 Internationals. On occasions when Ponting was unavailable, vice-captain Adam Gilchrist filled the role. In December 2007, Ponting was rested from the team to give the younger players exposure. Although vice-captain Gilchrist was in the team, 26-year-old Michael Clarke was selected as captain. Ponting called him the "obvious choice" and Clarke had been predicted to be the next full-time captain of Australia once Ponting stepped down from the captaincy. With Gilchrist's retirement from all forms of representative cricket at the end of the 2007–08 season, Clarke was promoted to the regular vice-captain's position. Thereafter, Cameron White was promoted as the captain, but George Bailey has taken over the captaincy in the two match series against India.

This is a list of cricketers who have captained the Australia national cricket team for at least one Twenty 20 International (T20I). A total of eleven players have captained Australia in T20Is, of which Aaron Finch is the most successful captain, with 35 wins. Australia are currently captained by Mitchell Marsh in Twenty20 Internationals.

Australian Twenty20 International captains
Number	Player	Year(s)	Matches	W	L	T	NR	Winning rate
1	Ricky Ponting	2005–2009	17	7	10	0	0	41.17%
2	Adam Gilchrist	2007	2	1	1	0	0	50.00%
3	Michael Clarke	2007–2010	18	12	4	1	1	73.52%
4	Brad Haddin	2009	2	1	1	0	0	50.00%
5	Cameron White	2011	6	2	4	0	0	33.33%
6	George Bailey	2012–2014	28	14	13	1	0	51.78%
7	Aaron Finch	2014–2022	76	40	32	1	3	55.47%
8	Steve Smith	2015–2016	8	4	4	0	0	50.00%
9	Shane Watson	2016	1	0	1	0	0	0.00%
10	David Warner	2016–2018	9	8	1	0	0	88.88%
11	Matthew Wade	2020–2023	13	4	9	0	0	30.76%
12	Mitchell Marsh	2023–present	35	26	8	0	1	74.28%
13	Travis Head	2024	1	0	1	0	0	0.00%
14	Josh Inglis	2024	3	3	0	0	0	100.00%
Total			203	112	84	3	4	55.17%

=== Captains in Men's ICC tournaments ===
Australian Captains in ICC Tournaments
Tournament	Player	Format	Matches	W	L	T/NR	Stand	Winning rate
1975 Cricket World Cup	Ian Chappell	ODI (60 overs)	5	3	2	0	Runners-up	60%
1979 Cricket World Cup	Kim Hughes	ODI (60 overs)	3	1	2	0	Group Stage	33.33%
1983 Cricket World Cup	Kim Hughes	ODI (60 overs)	6	2	4	0	Group Stage	33.33%
1987 Cricket World Cup	Allan Border	ODI	8	7	1	0	Champions	87.5%
1992 Cricket World Cup	Allan Border	ODI	8	4	4	0	Group Stage	50%
1996 Cricket World Cup	Mark Taylor	ODI	8	5	3	0	Runners-up	62.5%
1998 ICC KnockOut Trophy	Steve Waugh	ODI	1	0	1	0	Group Stage	0%
1999 Cricket World Cup	Steve Waugh	ODI	10	7	2	1	Champions	70%
2000 ICC KnockOut Trophy	Steve Waugh	ODI	1	0	1	0	Group Stage	0%
2002 ICC Champions Trophy	Ricky Ponting	ODI	3	2	1	0	Semi Finals	66.6%
2003 Cricket World Cup	Ricky Ponting	ODI	8	8	0	0	Champions	100%
2004 ICC Champions Trophy	Ricky Ponting	ODI	3	2	1	0	Semi Finals	66.6%
2006 ICC Champions Trophy	Ricky Ponting	ODI	5	4	1	0	Champions	80%
2007 Cricket World Cup	Ricky Ponting	ODI	11	11	0	0	Champions	100%
2007 World Twenty20	Ricky Ponting	T20I	6	3	3	0	Semi Finals	50%
2009 World Twenty20	Ricky Ponting	T20I	2	0	2	0	Group Stage	0%
2009 ICC Champions Trophy	Ricky Ponting	ODI	5	4	0	1	Champions	80%
2010 World Twenty20	Michael Clarke	T20I	7	6	1	0	Runners-up	85%
2011 Cricket World Cup	Ricky Ponting	ODI	7	4	2	1	Quarter-finals	57%
2012 World Twenty20	George Bailey	T20I	6	4	2	0	Semi Finals	66.6%
2013 ICC Champions Trophy	Michael Clarke	ODI	3	0	2	1	Group Stage	0%
2014 World Twenty20	George Bailey	T20I	4	1	3	0	Group Stage	25%
2015 Cricket World Cup	Michael Clarke	ODI	9	7	1	1	Champions	77.7%
2016 World Twenty20	Steve Smith	T20I	4	2	2	0	Super 10	50%
2017 ICC Champions Trophy	Steve Smith	ODI	3	0	1	2	Group Stage	0%
2019 Cricket World Cup	Aaron Finch	ODI	10	7	3	0	Semi Finals	70
2021 World Twenty20	Aaron Finch	T20I	7	6	1	0	Champions	85%
2022 Men's T20 World Cup	Aaron Finch	T20I	5	3	1	1	Group Stage	60%
2023 ICC World Test Championship Final	Pat Cummins	Test	1	1	0	0	Champions	100%
2023 Cricket World Cup	Pat Cummins	ODI	10	8	2	0	Champions	80%
2024 Men's T20 World Cup	Mitchell Marsh	T20I	7	5	2	0	Super 8	71%
2025 ICC Champions Trophy	Steve Smith	ODI	4	1	1	2	Semi Finals	25%
2025 ICC World Test Championship Final	Pat Cummins	Tests	1	0	1	0	Runners-up	0%
2026 Men's T20 World Cup	Travis Head	T20I	2	1	1	0	Group Stage	50%
2026 Men's T20 World Cup	Mitchell Marsh	T20I	2	1	1	0	Group Stage	50%

=== Other men's captains ===
Ian Chappell captained the WSC Australians in five Supertests in 1977–78, winning one and losing four. His brother Greg Chappell took over for a sixth Supertest, which the WSC Australians won. In 1978–79 in Australia Ian Chappell captained the WSC Australians in four Supertests, winning one, losing two and drawing the other one. In the same season in the West Indies, Ian Chappell went on to captain in five Supertests, winning one, losing one and drawing three.

Kim Hughes captained a Rebel Australian XI to South Africa in 1985–86. He captained his Australian XI in 3 Rebel "Tests", losing one of them and drawing the other two. He also captained in another rebel tour in 1986–87 in 4 Rebel "Tests", losing one of them and drawing the other three.

== Women's cricket ==
=== Women's test match captains ===
This is a list of cricketers who have captained the Australian women's cricket team for at least one Women's Test match. It does not including players who have deputised on the field for any period of time during a match where the captain has been unable to play. A dagger (†) next to a Test match series denotes a player who was deputized for the appointed captain for a proportion in a series.

Australian women's Test match captains
Number	Player	Year(s)	Opposition	Location	Matches	W	L	D
1	Margaret Peden	1934–35	England	Australia	3	0	2	1
1	Margaret Peden	1937	England	England	3	1	1	1
1	Margaret Peden	Total			6	1	3	2
2	Mollie Dive	1947–48	New Zealand	New Zealand	1	1	0	0
2	Mollie Dive	1948–49	England	Australia	3	1	0	2
2	Mollie Dive	1951	England	England	3	1	1	1
2	Mollie Dive	Total			7	3	1	3
3	Una Paisley	1956–57	New Zealand	Australia	1	1	0	0
3	Una Paisley	1957–58	England	Australia	3	0	0	3
3	Una Paisley	Total			4	1	0	3
4	Muriel Picton	1960–61	New Zealand	New Zealand	1	0	0	1
4	Muriel Picton	1968–69	England	Australia	3	0	0	3
4	Muriel Picton	Total			4	0	0	4
5	Mary Allitt	1963	England	England	3	0	1	2
6	Miriam Knee	1971–72	New Zealand	Australia	1	0	1	0
7	Wendy Blunsden	1974–75	New Zealand	New Zealand	1	0	0	1
8	Anne Gordon	1975–76	West Indies	West Indies	2	0	0	2
8	Anne Gordon	1976	England	England	3	0	0	3
8	Anne Gordon	Total			5	0	0	5
9	Margaret Jennings	1976–77	India	Australia	1	1	0	0
10	Sharon Tredrea	1978–79	New Zealand	Australia	3	1	0	2
10	Sharon Tredrea	1984–85†	England	Australia	1	0	0	1
10	Sharon Tredrea	Total			4	1	0	3
11	Jill Kennare	1983–84	India	India	4	0	0	4
12	Raelee Thompson	1984–85	England	Australia	4	2	1	1
13	Lyn Larsen	1987	England	England	3	1	0	2
13	Lyn Larsen	1989–90	New Zealand	New Zealand	3	1	0	2
13	Lyn Larsen	1990–91	India	Australia	3	2	0	1
13	Lyn Larsen	1991–92	England	Australia	1	1	0	0
13	Lyn Larsen	Total			10	5	0	5
14	Belinda Clark	1994–95	New Zealand	New Zealand	1	0	0	1
14	Belinda Clark	1995–96	New Zealand	Australia	1	0	0	1
14	Belinda Clark	1998	England	England	3	0	0	3
14	Belinda Clark	2001	England	England	2	2	0	0
14	Belinda Clark	2002–03	England	Australia	2	1	0	1
14	Belinda Clark	2005	England	England	2	0	1	1
14	Belinda Clark	Total			10	3	1	6
15	Karen Rolton	2005–06	India	Australia	1	1	0	0
15	Karen Rolton	2007–08	England	Australia	1	0	1	0
15	Karen Rolton	Total			2	1	1	0
16	Jodie Fields	2009	England	England	1	0	0	1
16	Jodie Fields	2013	England	England	1	0	0	1
16	Jodie Fields	2013–14	England	Australia	1	0	1	0
16	Jodie Fields	Total			3	0	1	2
17	Alex Blackwell	2010–11	England	Australia	1	1	0	0
18	Meg Lanning	2015	England	England	1	1	0	0
18	Meg Lanning	2019	England	England	1	0	0	1
18	Meg Lanning	2021–22	India	Australia	1	0	0	1
18	Meg Lanning	2021–22	England	Australia	1	0	0	1
18	Meg Lanning	Total			4	1	0	3
19	Rachael Haynes	2017–18	England	Australia	1	0	0	1
20	Alyssa Healy	2023	England	England	1	1	0	0
20	Alyssa Healy	2023–24	India	India	1	0	1	0
20	Alyssa Healy	2023–24	South Africa	Australia	1	1	0	0
20	Alyssa Healy	2024–25	England	Australia	1	1	0	0
20	Alyssa Healy	2025–26	India	Australia	1	1	0	0
20	Alyssa Healy	Total			5	4	1	0
Grand total					81	24	11	46

Last updated: 27 September 2026

=== Women's One-Day International captains ===
This is a list of cricketers who have captained the Australian women's cricket team for at least one women's One-Day International. Australia won the World Cup in 1977–78, 1981–82, 1988–89, 1997–98, 2004–05 and 2021–22.

Australian women's ODI captains
Number	Player	Year(s)	Matches	W	T	L	NR
1	Miriam Knee	1973	6	4	0	1	1
2	Anne Gordon	1976	3	1	0	2	0
3	Margaret Jennings	1978	3	3	0	0	0
4	Sharon Tredrea	1982–1988	15	14	1	0	0
5	Jill Kennare	1984	4	4	0	0	0
6	Raelee Thompson	1985	3	3	0	0	0
7	Denise Emerson	1985	3	2	0	1	0
8	Lyn Larsen	1986–1993	40	27	0	11	2
9	Karen Brown	1991	1	1	0	0	0
10	Christina Matthews	1993	1	1	0	0	0
11	Belinda Clark	1994–2005	101	83	0	17	1
12	Karen Rolton	2001–2009	43	30	0	13	0
13	Lisa Sthalekar	2006	3	3	0	0	0
14	Alex Blackwell	2009–2012	13	12	0	1	0
15	Jodie Fields	2009–2013	29	18	0	9	2
16	Meg Lanning	2014–2023	78	69	1	8	0
17	Rachael Haynes	2017–2020	7	6	0	1	0
18	Alyssa Healy	2023–2026	29	23	0	5	1
19	Tahlia McGrath	2023–2025	6	6	0	0	0
Grand total			388	310	2	69	7

Last updated: 18 February 2026

=== Women's Twenty20 International captains ===
This is a list of cricketers who have captained the Australian women's cricket team for at least one women's Twenty20 International. The table of results is complete to the third T20I against the West Indies in October 2023.

Australian women's Twenty20 International captains
Number	Player	Year(s)	Matches	W	L	T	NR
1	Belinda Clark	2005	1	1	0	0	0
2	Karen Rolton	2006–2009	13	8	1	4	0
3	Jodie Fields	2009–2013	26	16	0	10	0
4	Alex Blackwell	2010–2011	20	8	1	11	0
5	Meg Lanning	2014–2023	100	76	1	18	0
6	Rachael Haynes	2017–2020	6	3	0	3	0
7	Alyssa Healy	2022–2024	25	19	5	1	0
8	Tahlia McGrath	2022–2025	9	8	1	0	0
9	Sophie Molineux	2026–present	1	0	1	0	0
Grand total			201	139	4	53	5

Last updated: 18 February 2026

== Youth cricket ==
=== Youth Test captains ===
This is a list of cricketers who have captained the Australia Under-19 cricket team for at least one match. Where a player has a dagger (†) next to a Test match series in which he captained at least one Test, that denotes that player was captain for a minor proportion in a series.

Australian Under-19 Test match captains
Number	Player	Year	Opposition	Location	Matches	W	L	D
1	Darryl Smith	1978–79	England	Australia	2	0	0	2
2	Laurie Potter	1980–81	Pakistan	Pakistan	3	0	2	1
3	Mike Veletta	1981–82	Pakistan	Australia	3	0	1	2
3	Mike Veletta	1983	England	England	3	2	1	0
3	Mike Veletta	Total			6	2	2	2
4	Jamie McPhee	1983–84	Sri Lanka	Australia	3	1	0	2
5	Dean Reynolds	1984–85	India	India	3	1	0	2
5	Dean Reynolds	1984–85	Sri Lanka	Sri Lanka	1	0	1	0
5	Dean Reynolds	1985–86	New Zealand	Australia	3	0	0	3
5	Dean Reynolds	1986–87	India	Australia	3	2	0	1
5	Dean Reynolds	Total			10	3	1	6
6	Geoff Parker	1986–87	New Zealand	New Zealand	3	2	0	1
7	Stuart Law	1987–88	West Indies	Australia	1	0	1	0
8	Matthew May	1988–89	New Zealand	Australia	3	2	0	1
9	Jason Gallian	1989–90	England	Australia	2	0	0	2
10	Jamie Cox	1990	West Indies	West Indies	3	2	0	1
11	Damien Martyn	1991	England	England	3	1	1	1
12	Nathan Ashley	1992–93	New Zealand	New Zealand	2	0	1	1
13	Rob Baker	1993–94	India	India	3	1	1	1
14	Adam Smith	1994–95	India	Australia	3	2	0	1
15	Clinton Peake	1995–96	New Zealand	Australia	3	2	1	0
16	Brad Haddin	1996–97	Pakistan	Pakistan	2	1	0	1
17	Tim Anderson	1997–98	Pakistan	Australia	3	0	0	3
18	Michael Klinger	1999	England	England	3	1	1	1
19	Nathan Hauritz	2000–01	Sri Lanka	Australia	2	2	0	0
20	Tim Welsford	2000–01†	Sri Lanka	Australia	1	1	0	0
21	Greg Hunt	2002–03	England	Australia	3	2	1	0
22	Tom Beaton	2009	India	Australia	1	0	1	0
23	Mitchell Marsh	2009	India	Australia	1	1	0	0
24	Seb Gotch	2009	India	Australia	1	1	0	0
25	Jake Doran	2015	England	England	1	0	0	1
26	Will Sutherland	2017	Sri Lanka	Australia	1	0	0	1
27	Baxter Holt	2019	Sri Lanka	Sri Lanka	1	0	1	0
Grand total					70	26	15	29

=== Youth One-Day International captains ===
This is a list of cricketers who have captained the Australia Under-19 cricket team for at least one Under-19 One Day International. The table of results is complete to the 2012 ICC Under-19 World Cup. Australia won the World Cup in 1987–88 and 2001–02.

Australian Under-19 ODI captains
Number	Player	Year(s)	Matches	W	L	T	NR
1	Braddon Green	1977	2	1	0	1	0
2	Darryl Smith	1978–79	1	1	0	0	0
3	Mike Veletta	1983	2	1	0	1	0
4	Jamie McPhee	1983–84	3	2	0	1	0
5	Dean Reynolds	1984–85 to 1986–87	12	10	0	2	0
6	Geoff Parker	1986–87 to 1987–88	12	11	0	1	0
7	Matthew May	1988–89	3	3	0	0	0
8	Jason Gallian	1989–90	2	2	0	0	0
9	Damien Martyn	1991	2	2	0	0	0
10	Nathan Ashley	1992–93	3	2	0	1	0
11	Rob Baker	1993–94	1	0	0	1	0
12	Adam Smith	1994–95	3	2	0	1	0
13	Clinton Peake	1995–96	3	1	0	2	0
14	Brad Haddin	1996–97	1	0	1	0	0
15	Tim Anderson	1997–98	9	8	0	1	0
16	Michael Klinger	1999	3	2	0	1	0
17	Nathan Hauritz	1999–2000 to 2000–01	3	2	0	1	0
18	Michael Clarke	1999–2000	5	3	0	2	0
19	Tim Welsford	2000–01	3	0	0	1	2
20	Cameron White	2001–02	8	8	0	0	0
21	Greg Hunt	2002–03	5	4	0	1	0
22	Tim Paine	2003–04	8	6	0	2	0
23	Usman Khawaja	2005–06	5	1	0	4	0
24	Moises Henriques	2005–06	5	4	0	1	0
25	Simon Keen	2006–07	1	1	0	0	0
26	Michael Hill	2006–07	2	2	0	0	2
27	Phillip Hughes	2006–07	1	0	0	1	0
28	Daniel Burns	2006–07	1	0	0	1	0
29	Jeremy Smith	2006–07	1	0	0	1	0
30	Sam Robson	2006–07	1	0	0	1	0
31	Tim Buszard	2007	3	0	0	3	0
32	Mitchell Marsh	2009–10	7	5	0	2	0
33	Tom Triffitt	2009	1	0	0	1	0
34	Tim Armstrong	2009	2	1	0	1	0
35	Jason Floros	2009	2	1	0	1	0
36	Tom Beaton	2009	1	0	0	1	0
37	Luke Doran	2009	1	1	0	0	0
38	Sebastian Gotch	2011	3	1	0	2	0
39	Cameron Bancroft	2011	2	0	0	2	0
40	Kurtis Patterson	2011–12	4	2	0	2	0
41	Ashton Turner	2011	2	1	0	1	0
42	Will Bosisto	2012	13	8	0	5	0
43	Damien Mortimer	2013	7	4	0	3	0
44	Jake Doran	2013	1	0	1	0	0
45	Alex Gregory	2013–14	10	3	0	7	0
46	Ben McDermott	2013	2	1	0	1	0
47	Jaron Morgan	2013–14	3	1	0	2	0
Grand total			189	114	1	70	4

== See also ==
- List of Australian Test cricketers
- List of Australian ODI cricketers
- List of Australian Twenty20 International cricketers
