= Warne–Muralitharan Trophy =

Australia-Sri Lanka cricket award

Warne–Muralidaran Trophy
- The Warne–Muralidaran Trophy
- Countries: Australia; Sri Lanka
- Administrator: Cricket Australia; Sri Lanka Cricket
- Format: Test cricket
- First edition: 2007–08 (Australia)
- Latest edition: 2025 (Sri Lanka)
- Tournament format: Test Series
- Number of teams: 2
- Current trophy holder: Australia (2025)
- Most successful: Australia (5 series wins)
- Most runs: (Australia) Michael Hussey (994)
- Most wickets: (Sri Lanka) Rangana Herath (56)

The Warne–Muralidaran Trophy is awarded to the winner of the Australia–Sri Lanka Test cricket series from 2007–08 season onwards. The trophy is named after the two leading wicket takers in Test cricket, Sri Lanka's Muttiah Muralitharan (who prefers to romanise his name as "Muralidaran") and Australia's Shane Warne. The trophy celebrates the 25th anniversary of Australia–Sri Lanka Test cricket. The trophy features casts of the two bowlers' right hands and match-used cricket balls bowled by them during their careers. Sri Lanka Cricket, the governing body of cricket in Sri Lanka had written to its Australian counterpart, Cricket Australia, that the winner of the series should be awarded a trophy named after the two bowlers. Cricket Australia had responded positively to the Sri Lankans' proposal. In unveiling the trophy, Cricket Australia said in a statement,

...The two greatest bowlers in world cricket history have lent their names to a perpetual prize that will be played for in the Test series between Australia and Sri Lanka.

The Warne–Muralidaran trophy became the latest addition to the series of trophies named after former players such as the Border–Gavaskar Trophy, for Test series between Australia and India and the Chappell–Hadlee Trophy which is contested between Australia and New Zealand in ODI format.

== Results ==
Year	Host	Winning team
2007–08	Australia	Australia
2011	Sri Lanka	Australia
2012–13	Australia	Australia
2016	Sri Lanka	Sri Lanka
2018–19	Australia	Australia
2022	Sri Lanka	Drawn
2024–25	Sri Lanka	Australia

Total Series	Australia	Sri Lanka	Drawn
7	5	1	1

== History ==
=== Background ===
Before the Warne–Muralidaran Trophy, (1983–2004), Australia and Sri Lanka had played each other 18 times in the 21-year period, there had been four tours in each country. Out of the 18 tests, Australia had won 11 times while Sri Lanka had won only once, in 1999, and 6 Tests had been drawn. The following were all regular, not Warne–Muralidaran Tests between the two countries:

Season	Host	Tests	Australia	Sri Lanka	Drawn	Result
1982–83	Sri Lanka	1	1	0	0	Australia
1987–88	Australia	1	1	0	0	Australia
1989–90	Australia	2	1	0	1	Australia
1992	Sri Lanka	3	1	0	2	Australia
1995–96	Australia	3	3	0	0	Australia
1999	Sri Lanka	3	0	1	2	Sri Lanka
2003–04	Sri Lanka	3	3	0	0	Australia
2004	Australia	2	1	0	1	Australia

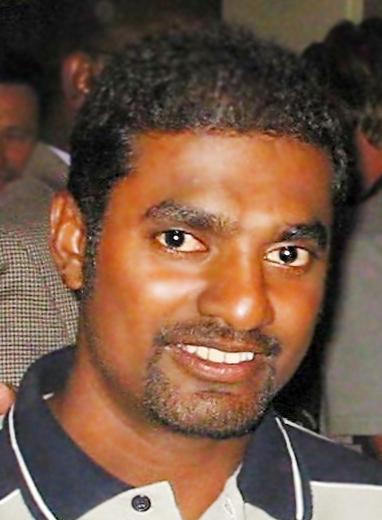
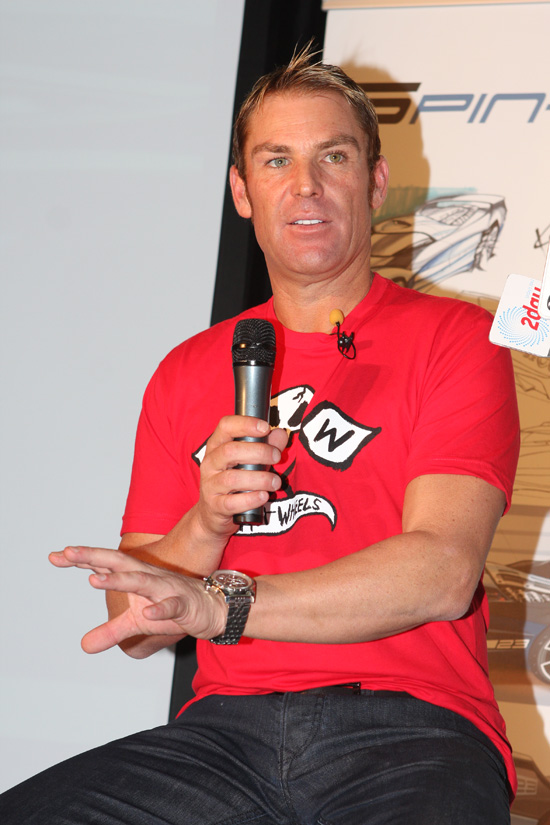
Left: Muttiah Muralitharan. Right: Shane Warne

=== Inaugural series ===
Shane Warne retired from cricket in 2007 with 708 wickets against his name and Muttiah Muralitharan played the 2007–2008 series eight wickets short of Warne's tally at the start of the series. Ricky Ponting stated that he was determined to deny Murali from getting the nine wickets required to surpass Warne as the highest wicket-taker in Test cricket while in Australia. At the end of the series Muralitharan had bagged only four wickets. Australia won the test series and the trophy 2–0. In the second Test, Kumar Sangakkara was given out when the ball actually hit his shoulder on 192 by umpire Rudi Koertzen. After the match Koertzen apologised to Sangakkara. During the series Marvan Atapattu, former Sri Lankan cricket captain criticised the selecting board of Sri Lanka Cricket saying the selectors were a group of "Muppets headed by a joker" referring to the chairman of selectors, Ashantha de Mel. Atapattu retired from cricket at the end of the series.

=== 2011 series ===
On the second day of the first Test, Nathan Lyon took his first wicket in tests with his first ball, his victim was Kumar Sangakkara; he is the 14th international player and 2nd Australian to do so. He finished with figures of 5/34, becoming the 131st player to take five wickets on debut in a Test match. Also, Trent Copeland took his first wicket in tests with his second ball; his victim was Tillakaratne Dilshan. Also in the first test, the ICC admitted that the hawk-eye or eagle-eye made an error.

On the first day of the third Test Shaminda Eranga got his first wicket in Tests with his first ball (repeating Nathan Lyon's feat in the first Test); his victim was Shane Watson. Also on the first day Shaun Marsh achieved an average of 209, the highest ever by an Australian. Michael Hussey was Man of the Match for all three test matches and was also awarded Man of the Series.

=== 2012–13 series ===
Australia completed a clean sweep of the series, winning 3–0.

=== 2016 series ===
Sri Lanka had a poor run leading up to this series, where they lost across all forms in England. The first match at Pallekele was a memorable one for Kusal Mendis who scored his maiden test century (176) and bowling of Rangana Herath lead Sri Lanka to a 106-run victory, their first test victory over the visitors in 17 years. The win boosted the confidence of the home team leading to the second test in Galle. Performances by Herath and Dilruwan Perera sealed the series with a 229-run victory. The spin duo took 18 wickets out of the possible 20 in the game. The third test was at SSC, Dinesh Chandimal and Dhananjaya de Silva scored centuries in the first innings. In reply, Shaun Marsh and Steven Smith scored centuries for the visitors. In the third and crucial innings, Kaushal Silva scored a century setting a target of over 300 for the Aussies. On the final day the Australians started to crumble, only David Warner scored a half-century and no other batsman scored more than 30. Herath took 13 wickets in the match and Sri Lanka managed to win by 163 runs, whitewashing Australia for the first time in their history. Herath won both Man of the match award and Player of the Series awards. With this win, Sri Lanka moved above South Africa in the Test rankings, and Australia lost the top spot in the rankings.

=== 2018–19 series ===
Australia completed a clean sweep of the series, winning 2–0.

== Warne–Muralidaran Trophy series ==
Series	Years	Host	Tests	Australia	Sri Lanka	Drawn	Result	Holder	Player of the Series
1	2007–08	Australia	2	2	0	0	Australia	Australia	(Australia) Brett Lee
2	2011	Sri Lanka	3	1	0	2	Australia	Australia	(Australia) Michael Hussey
3	2012–13	Australia	3	3	0	0	Australia	Australia	(Australia) Michael Clarke
4	2016	Sri Lanka	3	0	3	0	Sri Lanka	Sri Lanka	(Sri Lanka) Rangana Herath
5	2018–19	Australia	2	2	0	0	Australia	Australia	(Australia) Pat Cummins
6	2022	Sri Lanka	2	1	1	0	Drawn	Australia	(Sri Lanka) Dinesh Chandimal
7	2024–25	Sri Lanka	2	2	0	0	Australia	Australia	(Australia) Steve Smith
Total			16	10	4	2			

Total Series	Australia	Sri Lanka	Drawn
7	5	1	1

== See also ==
- Benaud–Qadir Trophy
- Sobers–Tissera Trophy
