= Welsford =

Welsford is a surname. Notable people with the surname include:

- Enid Welsford (1892–1981), English literary scholar
- Henry Welsford (1900–1974), American rower
- Malcolm Welsford, New Zealand record producer
- Sam Welsford (born 1996), Australian racing cyclist
- Tim Welsford (born 1982), Australian cricketer

== See also ==
- Welsford, Nova Scotia
