= Daryl Smith =

Daryl, Darryl, or Daryle Smith may also refer to:

- Daryl Smith (linebacker) (born 1982), American football linebacker
- Daryl Smith (defensive back) (born 1963), American football defensive back
- Daryl Smith (baseball) (born 1960), American baseball player
- Darryl Smith (cricketer) (born 1960), Australian cricketer
- Daryle Smith (1964–2010), American football player for the Dallas Cowboys, the Cleveland Browns, and the Philadelphia Eagles

== See also ==
- Darrell Smith (disambiguation)
