= Darrell Smith =

Darrell Smith may refer to:

- Darrell K. Smith (1961–2017), wide receiver and slotback in the Canadian Football League
- Darrell M. Smith (born 1971), American actor
- Darrell F. Smith (1927–2013), American politician, the Attorney General of Arizona

== See also ==
- Daryl Smith (disambiguation)
