= Josh Inglis =

English-born Australian cricketer (born 1995)

- Inglis in 2026

Personal information
- Full name: Joshua Patrick Inglis
- Born: 4 March 1995 (age 31); Leeds, West Yorkshire, England
- Batting: Right-handed
- Role: Wicket-keeper-batter

International information
- National side: Australia (2022–present)
- Test debut (cap 470): 29 January 2025 v Sri Lanka
- Last Test: 27 October 2026 v South Africa
- ODI debut (cap 238): 24 June 2022 v Sri Lanka
- Last ODI: 24 September 2026 v South Africa
- ODI shirt no.: 48
- T20I debut (cap 99): 11 February 2022 v Sri Lanka
- Last T20I: 21 June 2026 v Bangladesh
- T20I shirt no.: 48

Domestic team information
- Years: Team
- 2016/17–present: Western Australia
- 2017/18–present: Perth Scorchers
- 2021–2022: London Spirit
- 2021: Leicestershire
- 2024: San Francisco Unicorns
- 2025: Punjab Kings
- 2026: Lucknow Super Giants

Career statistics
Competition	Test	ODI	T20I	FC
Matches	6	43	49	66
Runs scored	290	1,100	1,033	3,450
Batting average	32.22	30.55	26.48	35.20
100s/50s	2/0	2/6	2/2	9/12
Top score	102	120*	110	153*
Catches/stumpings	2/0	39/5	31/3	208/3
Medal record
Men's cricket
Representing Australia
ICC World Test Championship
Winner	2021–2023
Runner-up	2023–2025
ICC Cricket World Cup
Winner	2023 India
ICC T20 World Cup
Winner	2021 UAE & Oman
- Source: ESPNcricinfo, 1 November 2026

Joshua Patrick Inglis (born 4 March 1995) is an Australian cricketer who represents the Australia national team as a wicket-keeper-batter in all three formats of the game. Inglis has captained Australia in ODI and T20Is. He plays for Western Australia in domestic cricket, Perth Scorchers in the Big Bash League and Lucknow Super Giants in the Indian Premier League.

Inglis was a member of the Australian squad that won the 2023 ICC Cricket World Cup. Inglis was a member of the Australian team that won the 2021 T20 World Cup, but did not play in the tournament. Inglis was also a member of the Australian team that won the 2023 ICC World Test Championship final but did not make his Test debut until January 2025 as a middle-order batsman against Sri Lanka, where he scored a century on debut, and became the fourth Australian to score centuries in all three formats.

== Background ==
Inglis was born in Leeds, West Yorkshire, England, and moved to Australia with his family at 14-years-old.

== Career ==
Inglis made his first-class debut for Cricket Australia XI against the West Indians during their tour of Australia in December 2015. He made his List A debut for Cricket Australia XI against Pakistanis during their tour of Australia in January 2017. He made his Twenty20 debut for Perth Scorchers in the 2017–18 Big Bash League season on 23 December 2017.

In October 2020, in the opening round of the 2020–21 Sheffield Shield season, Inglis scored his maiden first-class century, with 153 not out against South Australia. In March 2021, Inglis was signed by Leicestershire County Cricket Club to play in the 2021 T20 Blast tournament in England. In June 2021, Inglis scored his first century in a T20 match, with 103 not out for Leicestershire. He scored his second T20 century, against Worcestershire, with an unbeaten 118 from 61 balls.

In August 2021, Inglis was named in Australia's squad for the 2021 ICC Men's T20 World Cup, in his maiden call-up to the national team. In January 2022, Inglis was named in Australia's Twenty20 International (T20I) squad for their series against Sri Lanka. Inglis made his T20I debut on 11 February 2022, for Australia against Sri Lanka. Later the same month, Inglis was named in Australia's One Day International (ODI) squad for their tour of Pakistan. In April 2022, Inglis was also named in Australia's ODI squad for their tour of Sri Lanka. He made his ODI debut on 24 June 2022, for Australia against Sri Lanka. In 2023, he was selected in Australia's squad for the ODI Cricket World Cup. He scored 58 runs off 59 balls while chasing a target of 210 against Sri Lanka in their third match. In November 2023, he scored his maiden T20 hundred in the first T20i against India in Vishakhapatnam.

In May 2024, he was named in Australia's squad for the 2024 ICC Men's T20 World Cup tournament.

In July 2024 Inglis was named in Australia's white ball squad to tour Scotland and England. On 6 September 2024 in the 2nd T20I against Scotland, Inglis scored his 2nd T20I century. Inglis reached 100 in 43 balls making it the fastest century ever hit by an Australian batter in T20Is.

Inglis filled in for Pat Cummins as captain of the Australian team in the third ODI against Pakistan on 10 November 2024.

Before the first Test in Australia's tour of Sri Lanka in January 2025, Inglis received his 'Baggy Green' Test Cap from Geoff Marsh and became the 470th Australian to play tests for Australia. He scored a century on debut.

Inglis returned to the Test team in their next series against the West Indies for the Frank Worrell Trophy in July, playing one match and scoring 17 runs across both innings.

In the 2025–26 Ashes series, Inglis played 2 matches, scoring 65 runs at an average of 21.66 across 3 innings. In the 2nd Test in Brisbane, he displayed a great set of fielding by running out England captain Ben Stokes falling away from the stumps.

== Statistics ==
As of 1 June 2025.

T20 Franchise Statistics
Team	Season	League		Batting				Fielding	
Team	Season	Competition	Matches	Runs	Average	High score	100s / 50s	Catches	Stumpings
Perth Scorchers	2017/18	Big Bash League	6	11	5.50	7	0 / 0	4	1
Perth Scorchers	2018/19	Big Bash League	4	112	28.00	55	0 / 1	2	0
Perth Scorchers	2019/20	Big Bash League	14	405	28.92	73	0 / 4	9	4
Perth Scorchers	2020/21	Big Bash League	17	413	34.41	72*	0 / 3	11	2
Perth Scorchers	2021/22	Big Bash League	8	137	17.12	79	0 / 1	9	4
Perth Scorchers	2022/23	Big Bash League	16	431	35.91	74	0 / 4	16	2
Perth Scorchers	2023/24	Big Bash League	11	238	34.00	64	0 / 1	13	3
Perth Scorchers	2024/25	Big Bash League	2	53	26.50	49	0 / 0	1	0
Perth Scorchers	Total		78	1,800	29.50	79	0 / 14	65	16
London Spirit	2021	The Hundred	8	173	24.71	72	0 / 2	3	0
London Spirit	2022	The Hundred	1	3	3.00	3	0 / 0	1	0
London Spirit	Total		9	176	22.00	72	0 / 2	4	0
Leicestershire	2021	T20 Blast	14	531	48.27	118*	2 / 1	6	2
Leicestershire	Total		14	531	48.27	118*	2 / 1	6	2
San Francisco Unicorns	2024	Major League Cricket	9	157	19.62	45	0 / 0	7	0
San Francisco Unicorns	Total		9	157	19.62	45	0 / 0	7	0
Punjab Kings	2025	Indian Premier League	11	239	29.87	73	0 / 1	9	1
Lucknow Super Giants	2026	Indian Premier League	4	194	48.50	85	0 / 2	1	0
Lucknow Super Giants	Total		15	472	36.31	85	0 / 3	10	1
Career Total			120	2,903	25.58	118*	2 / 18	91	19
