= Adam Smith (cricketer) =

Australian cricketer (born 1976)

Personal information
- Born: 6 April 1976 (age 50); Melbourne, Australia

Domestic team information
- Years: Team
- 1997: Victoria
- Source: Cricinfo, 12 December 2015

Adam Smith (born 6 April 1976) is an Australian former cricketer. An all-rounder, Smith bowled left-arm orthodox. He played three first-class cricket matches for Victoria in 1997. Prior to playing for Victoria, Smith played for Northcote Cricket Club and captained the Australian under-19 team. He made his debut for Victoria on 5 February 1997 at the Melbourne Cricket Ground against Queensland as a replacement for Brad Stacey. Batting at 8, he scored 36 runs in the first innings and 12 in the second and took no wickets.

Smith is the son of 1976 VFL grand final umpire Kevin Smith.

== See also ==
- List of Victoria first-class cricketers
