= Australian cricket team in New Zealand in 1989–90 =

International cricket tour

The Australia national cricket team toured New Zealand from February to March 1990 and played a single Test match against the New Zealand national cricket team which New Zealand won. New Zealand were captained by John Wright and Australia by Allan Border. In addition, the teams took part in a Limited Overs International (LOI) tournament with the India national cricket team which Australia won.

== Test series summary ==
15–19 March 1990
(5-day match)
Scorecard

Australia	v	New Zealand
110 (45.2 overs); PL Taylor 29 (73); RJ Hadlee 5/39 (16.2 overs)		202 (121 overs); JG Wright 36 (149); TM Alderman 4/46 (29 overs)
269 (109.2 overs); PL Taylor 87 (153); JG Bracewell 6/85 (34.2 overs)		181/1 (63.4 overs); JG Wright 117* (197); GD Campbell 1/23 (7 overs)

New Zealand won by 9 wickets
Basin Reserve, Wellington
Umpires: RS Dunne and SJ Woodward
Player of the match: JG Wright (NZ)

- Australia won the toss and elected to bat.
