= Australian cricket team in Sri Lanka in 2024–25 =

International cricket tour

	Sri Lanka	Australia
- Dates: 29 January – 14 February 2025
Captains	Dhananjaya de Silva (Tests); Charith Asalanka (ODIs)	Steve Smith

Test series
- Result: Australia won the 2-match series 2–0
Most runs	Kusal Mendis (190)	Usman Khawaja (295)
Most wickets	Prabath Jayasuriya (9)	Matthew Kuhnemann (16)
- Player of the series: Steve Smith (Aus)

One Day International series
- Results: Sri Lanka won the 2-match series 2–0
Most runs	Charith Asalanka (205)	Alex Carey (41); Steve Smith (41)
Most wickets	Dunith Wellalage (6)	Sean Abbott (4)
- Player of the series: Charith Asalanka (SL)

The Australia cricket team toured Sri Lanka in January and February 2025 to play the Sri Lanka cricket team. The tour consisted of two Tests and two One Day International (ODI) matches. The Test series, where the teams contested for the Warne–Muralitharan Trophy, formed part of the 2023–2025 ICC World Test Championship. The ODI series served as part of Australia's preparation for the 2025 ICC Champions Trophy in February 2025. In November 2024, the Sri Lanka Cricket (SLC) confirmed the fixtures for the tour. Australia had last toured Sri Lanka in 2022.

Initially, the tour included only one ODI match. Later, the schedule was revised by SLC to include two ODI matches. The Test matches were played at the Galle International Stadium in Galle, and Australia won the series 2–0. The ODI matches were played at the R. Premadasa Stadium in Colombo, and Sri Lanka won the series 2–0.

== Squads ==
Sri Lanka		Australia	
Tests	ODIs	Tests	ODIs
Dhananjaya de Silva (c); Dinesh Chandimal (wk); Sonal Dinusha; Asitha Fernando; Oshada Fernando; Vishwa Fernando (Note: In squad for 1st Test only.); Prabath Jayasuriya; Dimuth Karunaratne; Lahiru Kumara; Angelo Mathews; Kamindu Mendis; Kusal Mendis (wk); Ramesh Mendis (Note: In squad for 2nd Test only.); Pathum Nissanka; Nishan Peiris; Milan Rathnayake; Sadeera Samarawickrama (wk); Lahiru Udara; Jeffrey Vandersay	Charith Asalanka (c); Asitha Fernando; Avishka Fernando; Nuwanidu Fernando; Wanindu Hasaranga; Lahiru Kumara; Janith Liyanage; Nishan Madushka (wk); Eshan Malinga; Kamindu Mendis; Kusal Mendis (wk); Pathum Nissanka; Mohamed Shiraz; Maheesh Theekshana; Jeffrey Vandersay; Dunith Wellalage	Steve Smith (c); Travis Head (vc); Sean Abbott; Scott Boland; Alex Carey (wk); Cooper Connolly; Josh Inglis (wk); Usman Khawaja; Sam Konstas; Matthew Kuhnemann; Marnus Labuschagne; Nathan Lyon; Nathan McSweeney; Todd Murphy; Mitchell Starc; Beau Webster	Steve Smith (c); ~~Pat Cummins (c)~~; Sean Abbott; Alex Carey (wk); Cooper Connolly; Ben Dwarshuis; Nathan Ellis; Jake Fraser-McGurk; Aaron Hardie; ~~Josh Hazlewood~~; Travis Head; Josh Inglis (wk); Spencer Johnson; Marnus Labuschagne; ~~Mitchell Marsh~~; Glenn Maxwell; Tanveer Sangha; Matthew Short; ~~Mitchell Starc~~; ~~Marcus Stoinis~~

On 5 February, Ramesh Mendis was added into the squad for the 2nd Test.

On 6 February, Marcus Stoinis was ruled out of the ODI series after his retirement. On the same day, both Pat Cummins and Josh Hazlewood were also ruled out of the ODI series as well as the 2025 ICC Champions Trophy with Sean Abbott, Cooper Connolly, Ben Dwarshuis, Jake Fraser-McGurk, Spencer Johnson and Tanveer Sangha were added to the ODI squad.

== Test series ==
=== 1st Test ===
29 January–1 February 2025
Scorecard

Australia	v	Sri Lanka
654/6d (154 overs); Usman Khawaja 232 (352); Jeffrey Vandersay 3/182 (38 overs)		165 (52.2 overs); Dinesh Chandimal 72 (139); Matthew Kuhnemann 5/63 (18.2 overs)
		247 (54.3 overs) (f/o); Jeffrey Vandersay 53 (47); Nathan Lyon 4/78 (19 overs)

Australia won by an innings and 242 runs
Galle International Stadium, Galle
Umpires: Chris Gaffaney (NZ) and Adrian Holdstock (SA)
Player of the match: Usman Khawaja (Aus)

- Australia won the toss and elected to bat.
- Rain washed out play after lunch on Day 3.
- Josh Inglis (Aus) scored the second fastest century on Test debut.
- Steve Smith (Aus) scored his 10,000th run in Tests.
- Usman Khawaja (Aus) scored his first double century in Tests. He became the first Australian batsman to score a Test match double century in Sri Lanka and became the second oldest Australian Test cricketer to score a double century at the age of 38 years and 42 days, just behind Don Bradman.
- Usman Khawaja & Steve Smith's partnership of 266 runs for the third wicket was the highest third-wicket partnership by an Australian pair in Asia.
- Nishan Peiris (SL) registered the worst bowling figures by a Sri Lankan bowler in an innings of a Test match with 0/189.
- Mitchell Starc (Aus) took his 700th wicket in international cricket.
- Jeffrey Vandersay (SL) became the first Sri Lankan batter batting at number nine or lower to score a half-century in an innings of a Test match against Australia.
- This was Australia's fourth largest innings victory and Sri Lanka's biggest defeat.
- World Test Championship points: Australia 12, Sri Lanka 0.

=== 2nd Test ===
6–9 February 2025
Scorecard

Sri Lanka	v	Australia
257 (97.4 overs); Kusal Mendis 85* (139); Mitchell Starc 3/37 (16 overs)		414 (106.4 overs); Alex Carey 156 (188); Prabath Jayasuriya 5/151 (38 overs)
231 (68.1 overs); Angelo Mathews 76 (149); Matthew Kuhnemann 4/63 (23 overs)		75/1 (17.4 overs); Usman Khawaja 27* (44); Prabath Jayasuriya 1/20 (6 overs)

Australia won by 9 wickets
Galle International Stadium, Galle
Umpires: Adrian Holdstock (SA) and Joel Wilson (WI)
Player of the match: Alex Carey (Aus)

- Sri Lanka won the toss and elected to bat.
- Cooper Connolly (Aus) made his Test debut.
- Dimuth Karunaratne (SL) played in his 100th and last Test match.
- In the Sri Lankan first innings, Steve Smith took his 197th catch in Test cricket, breaking the Australian record of 196 by Ricky Ponting, and completed 200 catches in the second innings, the first Australian and fifth overall to reach the landmark in Tests.
- Alex Carey's 156 was the highest score by an Australian wicket-keeper in Asia.
- Thushara Cooray (SL) appeared in his 100th Test match as an official match scorer.
- World Test Championship points: Australia 12, Sri Lanka 0.

== ODI series ==
=== 1st ODI ===
12 February 2025
10:00
Scorecard

Sri Lanka; 214 (46 overs)	v	Australia; 165 (33.5 overs)
Charith Asalanka 127 (126); Sean Abbott 3/61 (9 overs)		Alex Carey 41 (38); Maheesh Theekshana 4/40 (9.5 overs)

Sri Lanka won by 49 runs
R. Premadasa Stadium, Colombo
Umpires: Chris Gaffaney (NZ) and Prageeth Rambukwella (SL)
Player of the match: Charith Asalanka (SL)

- Sri Lanka won the toss and elected to bat.

=== 2nd ODI ===
14 February 2025
10:00
Scorecard

Sri Lanka; 281/4 (50 overs)	v	Australia; 107 (24.2 overs)
Kusal Mendis 101 (115); Sean Abbott 1/41 (10 overs)		Steve Smith 29 (34); Dunith Wellalage 4/35 (7.2 overs)

Sri Lanka won by 174 runs
R. Premadasa Stadium, Colombo
Umpires: Adrian Holdstock (SA) and Ruchira Palliyaguruge (SL)
Player of the match: Kusal Mendis (SL)

- Sri Lanka won the toss and elected to bat.
- Kusal Mendis (SL) scored his 11,000th run in International cricket.
- This was Sri Lanka's biggest victory against Australia in ODIs and Australia 5th greatest loss margin.
