= Brad Stacey =

Australian cricketer (born 1972)

Personal information
- Full name: Bradley John Stacey
- Born: 11 June 1972 (age 54); Geelong, Australia

Domestic team information
- Years: Team
- 1996-1997: Victoria
- Source: Cricinfo, 12 December 2015

Brad Stacey (born 11 June 1972) is an Australian former cricketer. He played eight first-class cricket matches for Victoria between 1996 and 1997.

== See also ==
- List of Victoria first-class cricketers
