= Nathan Ashley =

Australian cricketer

Nathan William Ashley (born 3 October 1973) is a former Australian professional cricket-player. He was born in Sydney. He captained the Australian under 19 team in tests twice and One Day Internationals three times.

== Statistics ==
He played six first-class games in his career scoring 316 runs at an average of 31.60. Five of his first-class appearances were in England for Oxford University in 1999.

He did not score a century in the first-class matches in which he played even though he did score 96 on one occasion and another fifty. He never bowled in his first-class career.
