= Sri Lankan cricket team in Australia in 2007–08 =

Sri Lanka in Australia in 2007-08
	Australia	Sri Lanka
- Dates: 8 November – 20 November 2007
Captains	Ricky Ponting	Mahela Jayawardene

Test series
- Result: Australia won the 2-match series 2–0
Most runs	Phil Jaques (319)	Kumar Sangakkara (249)
Most wickets	Brett Lee (16)	Muttiah Muralitharan (4)
- Player of the series: Brett Lee

The Sri Lanka cricket team toured Australia for four tour matches, two Test matches and the 2007–08 Commonwealth Bank Series from 27 October 2007 to 7 March 2008.

== Squad lists ==
Test squads
Australia	Sri Lanka
Ricky Ponting (c)	Mahela Jayawardene (c)
Adam Gilchrist (wk)	Kumar Sangakkara (wk)
Stuart Clark	Marvan Atapattu
Michael Clarke	Malinga Bandara
Matthew Hayden	Sujeewa de Silva
Ben Hilfenhaus (added)	Dilhara Fernando
Brad Hogg	Sanath Jayasuriya
Michael Hussey	Prasanna Jayawardene (wk)
Phil Jaques	Farveez Maharoof
Mitchell Johnson	Lasith Malinga
Brett Lee	Jehan Mubarak
Stuart MacGill	Muttiah Muralitharan
Andrew Symonds	Thilan Samaraweera
Shaun Tait (withdrawn)	Chamara Silva
	Upul Tharanga
	Chaminda Vaas
	Michael Vandort
	Chanaka Welegedara

- Ben Hilfenhaus was added after Tait was withdrawn with an elbow injury.
- Sujeewa de Silva was added as cover for Welegedara.

== Test series ==
=== 1st Test ===
8–12 November
00:00 UTC

Australia	v	Sri Lanka
4/551 dec. (151 overs); Michael Clarke 145* (249); Michael Hussey 133 (249); Muttiah Muralitharan 2/170 (50 overs)		211 (81.5 overs); Marvan Atapattu 51 (183); Chamara Silva 40 (45); Brett Lee 4/26 (17.5 overs)
		300 (99.2 overs); Michael Vandort 82 (170); Mahela Jayawardene 49 (115); Brett Lee 4/86 (27 overs)

Australia won by an innings and 40 runs
The Gabba, Brisbane
Umpires: Tony Hill (NZ) and Rudi Koertzen (SA)
Player of the match: Brett Lee (Aus)

- Sri Lanka won the toss and elected to field first
- Mitchell Johnson (Aus) made his Test debut.

=== 2nd Test ===
16–20 November
23:30 UTC
Scorecard

Australia	v	Sri Lanka
5/542 dec. (139 overs); Phil Jaques 150 (237); Michael Hussey 132 (220); Dilhara Fernando 2/134 (26 overs)		246 (81.2 overs); Mahela Jayawardene 104 (194); Kumar Sangakkara 57 (76); Brett Lee 4/82 (23.2 overs)
2/210 dec. (46 overs); Phil Jaques 68 (95); Ricky Ponting 53* (102); Lasith Malinga 1/61 (12 overs)		410 (104.3 overs); Kumar Sangakkara 192 (282); Marvan Atapattu 80 (164); Brett Lee 4/87 (26.3 overs)

Australia won by 96 runs
Bellerive Oval, Hobart
Umpires: Aleem Dar (Pak) and Rudi Koertzen (SA)
Player of the match: Brett Lee (Aus)

== Tour Matches ==
=== Cricket Australia Chairman's XI ===
27–29 October
(scorecard)

Sri Lanka	v	CA Chairman's XI
368/6 dec. (96.2 overs); ST Jayasuriya 154 (153); AK Heal 3/50 (19 overs)		409 (122.2 overs); TC Plant 124 (322); M Muralitharan 4/122 (44 overs)
125/3 (36 overs); DPMD Jayawardene 52 (73); ML Lewis 2/17 (7 overs)

Match drawn
Adelaide Oval, Adelaide
Umpires: Andy Collins (Aus) and Andrew Willoughby (Aus)

=== Queensland ===
2–4 November
(scorecard)

Sri Lanka	v	Queensland
210/9 dec. (63.2 overs); HAPW Jayawardene 58 (130); AA Noffke 5/36 (14 overs)		295 (79.2 overs); AJ Bichel 125 (168); MF Maharoof 3/72 (20 overs)
226 (73.5 overs); WPUJC Vaas 84 (76); AA Noffke 3/21 (13 overs)		142/6 (37.1 overs); CT Perren 62* (74); MF Maharoof 3/33 (9 overs)

Queensland won by 4 wickets
Allan Border Field, Brisbane
Umpires: Andrew Curran (Aus) and Norm McNamara (Aus)
Player of the match: AA Noffke (Qld)

=== Prime Minister's XI ===
30 January
(scorecard)

Prime Minister's XI; 152 (38 overs)	v	Sri Lanka; 156/6 (31.5 overs)
AA Noffke 30 (54); SL Malinga 3/33 (9 overs)		TM Dilshan 75* (83); CL White 2/24 (6 overs)

Sri Lanka won by 4 wickets
Manuka Oval, Canberra
Umpires: Tim Laycock (Aus) and Yohan Ramasundra (Aus)
Player of the match: SL Malinga (SL)

=== Tasmania ===
2 February
Scorecard

Sri Lanka; 183/9 (47.4 overs)	v	Tasmania; 184/3 (36.1 overs)
DPMD Jayawardene 51 (59); BG Drew 5/36 (10 overs)		TD Paine 54 (76); KMDN Kulasekara 2/27 (6 overs)

Tasmania won by 7 wickets
Bellerive Oval, Hobart
Umpires: Brian Muir (Aus) and Greg Luck (Aus)

== See also ==
- Australian cricket team in 2007–08

Preceded by 2004	Sri Lankan cricket team in Australia	Succeeded by 2010–11
