= Australian cricket team in Sri Lanka in 2011 =

	Australia	Sri Lanka
- Dates: 6 August – 20 September 2011
Captains	Michael Clarke (Test and ODI); Cameron White (T20I)	Tillakaratne Dilshan

Test series
- Result: Australia won the 3-match series 1–0
Most runs	Michael Hussey (463)	Angelo Mathews (274)
Most wickets	Ryan Harris (11)	Rangana Herath (16)
- Player of the series: Michael Hussey (Aus)

One Day International series
- Results: Australia won the 5-match series 3–2
Most runs	Michael Clarke (242)	Mahela Jayawardene (180)
Most wickets	Mitchell Johnson (11)	Lasith Malinga (11)
- Player of the series: Michael Clarke (Aus)

Twenty20 International series
- Results: Sri Lanka won the 2-match series 2–0
Most runs	David Warner (69)	Tillakaratne Dilshan (108)
Most wickets	Brett Lee (4)	Ajantha Mendis (6)
- Player of the series: Ajantha Mendis and Tillakaratne Dilshan (both SL)

The Australian cricket team toured Sri Lanka from 6 August to 20 September 2011. The tour consisted of two Twenty20 Internationals (T20Is), five One Day Internationals (ODIs) and three Tests played for Warne–Muralitharan Trophy. Four uncapped players had been named in the Australian Test squad, namely Shaun Marsh, Trent Copeland, James Pattinson and Nathan Lyon. Lyon had only made four first-class appearances and was previously one of the groundstaff at the Adelaide Oval.

During the test series, a five-year old kid going by the name Sharujan Shanmuganathan caught the attention of viewers when his free-flowing, elegant cover drive became a talking point as it was captured by one of the camera operators during the course of the test match. Sharujan was only five-years-old when he received recognition for playing cover drives, and commentator Tony Greig, who was named as one of the commentators for the test match, reportedly spotted him playing at the grass bank of the Sinhalese Sports Club Cricket Ground. Tony Greig eventually nicknamed him "Little Sanga" during the air while doing commentary, and Greig later went on to interview the five-year-old Sharujan, which became an instant hit on television.

== Squads ==
Tests		ODIs		T20Is	
Sri Lanka	Australia	Sri Lanka	Australia	Sri Lanka	Australia
Tillakaratne Dilshan (c); Mahela Jayawardene; Rangana Herath; Prasanna Jayawardene (wk); Shaminda Eranga; Suraj Randiv; Suranga Lakmal; Angelo Mathews; Ajantha Mendis; Tharanga Paranavitana; Dhammika Prasad; Seekkuge Prasanna; Thilan Samaraweera; Kumar Sangakkara; Lahiru Thirimanne; Chanaka Welegedara	Michael Clarke (c); Shane Watson (vc); Michael Beer; Brad Haddin (wk); Trent Copeland; Ryan Harris; Phillip Hughes; Michael Hussey; Mitchell Johnson; Usman Khawaja; Nathan Lyon; Shaun Marsh; James Pattinson; Ricky Ponting; Peter Siddle	Tillakaratne Dilshan (c); Angelo Mathews (vc); Dinesh Chandimal; Kumar Sangakkara (wk); Rangana Herath; Mahela Jayawardene; Suraj Randiv; Nuwan Kulasekara; Suranga Lakmal; Ajantha Mendis; Jeevan Mendis; Chamara Silva; Thisara Perera; Lasith Malinga; Shaminda Eranga; Upul Tharanga; Seekkuge Prasanna	Michael Clarke (c); Doug Bollinger; Xavier Doherty; Brad Haddin (wk); John Hastings; David Hussey; Michael Hussey; Shaun Marsh; James Pattinson; Ricky Ponting; Steven Smith; Shane Watson	Tillakaratne Dilshan (c); Angelo Mathews (vc); Chamara Silva; Kumar Sangakkara (wk); Dhammika Prasad; Dilruwan Perera; Ajantha Mendis; Nuwan Kulasekara; Mahela Jayawardene; Shaminda Eranga; Dinesh Chandimal; Rangana Herath; Suraj Randiv; Suranga Lakmal; Jeevan Mendis; Thisara Perera	Cameron White (c); Aaron Finch; Brad Haddin (wk); John Hastings; David Hussey; Mitchell Johnson; Brett Lee; Shaun Marsh; Steve O'Keefe; James Pattinson; Steven Smith; David Warner; Shane Watson

== Tour matches ==
=== First-class: SL Board XI vs Australians ===
25–27 August 2011
Scorecard

Sri Lanka Board XI	v	Australians
258 (85 overs); Dinesh Chandimal 59 (90); Trent Copeland 5/47 (20 overs)		393 (121.3 overs); Michael Clarke 104 (127); Dilruwan Perera 3/137 (46 overs)
174/2 (49 overs); Lahiru Thirimanne 100 (161); Trent Copeland 1/14 (8 overs)

Match drawn
P Sara Oval, Colombo, Sri Lanka
Umpires: Rohitha Kottahachchi (Sri) and Tyron Wijewardene (Sri)

- Sri Lanka Board XI won the toss and elected to bat.

== T20I series ==
=== 1st T20I ===
6 August 2011 (D/N)
Scorecard

Sri Lanka; 198/3 (20 overs)	v	Australia; 163/8 (20 overs)
Tillakaratne Dilshan 104* (57); Brett Lee 1/38 (4 overs)		David Warner 53 (31); Dilruwan Perera 3/26 (4 overs)

Sri Lanka won by 35 runs
Pallekele International Cricket Stadium, Kandy, Sri Lanka
Umpires: Asoka De Silva (SL) and Ruchira Palliyaguruge (SL)
Player of the match: Tillakaratne Dilshan (SL)

- Australia won the toss and elected to field.
- Tillakaratne Dilshan (SL) scored his first century in T20Is.

=== 2nd T20I ===
8 August 2011 (D/N)
Scorecard

Sri Lanka; 157/9 (20 overs)	v	Australia; 149/9 (20 overs)
Mahela Jayawardene 86 (63); John Hastings 3/14 (4 overs)		Shane Watson 57 (24); Ajantha Mendis 6/16 (4 overs)

Sri Lanka won by 8 runs
Pallekele International Cricket Stadium, Kandy, Sri Lanka
Umpires: Ranmore Martinesz (SL) and Ruchira Palliyaguruge (SL)
Player of the match: Ajantha Mendis (SL)

- Sri Lanka won the toss and elected to bat.

== ODI series ==
=== 1st ODI ===
10 August 2011 (D/N)
Scorecard

Sri Lanka; 191 (40.1 overs)	v	Australia; 192/3 (38.1 overs)
Suraj Randiv 41 (50); Mitchell Johnson 6/31 (10 overs)		Shane Watson 69 (51); Suraj Randiv 2/43 (8 overs)

Australia won by 7 wickets (with 71 balls remaining)
Pallekele International Cricket Stadium, Kandy, Sri Lanka
Umpires: Asoka De Silva (SL) and Tony Hill (NZ)
Player of the match: Mitchell Johnson (Aus)

- Sri Lanka won the toss and elected to bat.

=== 2nd ODI ===
14 August 2011 (D/N)
Scorecard

Sri Lanka; 208 (49.3 overs)	v	Australia; 211/2 (38.2 overs)
Kumar Sangakkara 52 (85); Doug Bollinger 3/35 (10 overs)		Ricky Ponting 90* (106); Nuwan Kulasekara 1/38 (7 overs)

Australia won by 8 wickets
Mahinda Rajapaksa International Cricket Stadium, Hambantota, Sri Lanka
Umpires: Tony Hill (NZ) and Ruchira Palliyaguruge (SL)
Player of the match: Ricky Ponting (Aus)

- Sri Lanka won the toss and elected to bat.

=== 3rd ODI ===
16 August 2011 (D/N)
Scorecard

Sri Lanka; 286/9 (50 overs)	v	Australia; 208 (44.2 overs)
Upul Tharanga 111 (139); Doug Bollinger 4/42 (10 overs)		Michael Hussey 63 (76); Lasith Malinga 5/28 (8.2 overs)

Sri Lanka won by 78 runs
Mahinda Rajapaksa International Cricket Stadium, Hambantota, Sri Lanka
Umpires: Asad Rauf (Pak) and Ranmore Martinesz (SL)
Player of the match: Upul Tharanga (SL)

- Australia won the toss and elected to field.
- Shaminda Eranga (SL) made his ODI debut.

=== 4th ODI ===
20 August 2011 (D/N)
Scorecard

Sri Lanka; 132 (38.4 overs)	v	Australia; 133/5 (28 overs)
Mahela Jayawardene 53 (102); Brett Lee 4/15 (6.4 overs)		Shaun Marsh 70 (80); Seekkuge Prasanna 3/32 (6 overs)

Australia won by 5 wickets (with 132 balls remaining)
R. Premadasa Stadium, Colombo, Sri Lanka
Umpires: Asoka De Silva (SL) and Tony Hill (NZ)
Player of the match: Xavier Doherty (Aus)

- Sri Lanka won the toss and elected to bat.
- Seekkuge Prasanna (SL) made his ODI debut.

=== 5th ODI ===
22 August 2011 (D/N)
Scorecard

Australia; 211 (46.1 overs)	v	Sri Lanka; 213/6 (47 overs)
Shane Watson 56 (84); Lasith Malinga 3/35 (8 overs)		Mahela Jayawardene 71 (119); James Pattinson 2/41 (10 overs)

Sri Lanka won by 4 wickets (with 18 balls remaining)
R. Premadasa Stadium, Colombo, Sri Lanka
Umpires: Asad Rauf (Pak) and Ranmore Martinesz (SL)
Player of the match: Lasith Malinga (SL)

- Sri Lanka won the toss and elected to field.
- Lasith Malinga took his third ODI hat-trick.

== Test series (Warne–Muralitharan Trophy) ==
=== 1st Test ===
31 August – 4 September 2011
Scorecard

Australia	v	Sri Lanka
273 (86.5 overs); Michael Hussey 95 (178); Rangana Herath 3/54 (24 overs)		105 (50 overs); Tharanga Paranavitana 29 (85); Nathan Lyon 5/34 (15 overs)
210 (59.2 overs); Michael Clarke 60 (80); Rangana Herath 5/79 (23 overs)		253 (95.5 overs); Mahela Jayawardene 105 (215); Ryan Harris 5/62 (20 overs)

Australia won by 125 runs
Galle International Stadium, Galle, Sri Lanka
Umpires: Aleem Dar (Pak) and Richard Kettleborough (Eng)
Player of the match: Michael Hussey (Aus)

- Australia won the toss and elected to bat.
- Rain delayed play on Day 2 resulting Stumps to be called. Rain delayed play on Day 3 therefore there was no first session but an extended second and third session. Bad light on Day 3 suspended play at the end of the day with a min. of 3 overs to spare ultimately resulting in stumps. Rain delayed part of the first session on Day 4.
- Trent Copeland and Nathan Lyon (both Aus) made their Test debuts.

On the 2nd day of the test, Nathan Lyon took his first wicket in tests with his first ball, his victim was Kumar Sangakkara; he is the 14th international player and 2nd Australian to do so. He finished with figures of 5/34, becoming the 131st player to take five wickets on debut in a Test match. Also, Trent Copeland took his first wicket in tests with his second ball; his victim was Tillakaratne Dilshan.

Australia lead the series 1–0

=== 2nd Test ===
8–12 September 2011
Scorecard

Sri Lanka	v	Australia
174 (64.1 overs); Angelo Mathews 58 (111); Ryan Harris 3/38 (16 overs)		411/7d (132 overs); Michael Hussey 142 (244); Suraj Randiv 3/103 (43 overs)
317/6 (114.3 overs); Kumar Sangakkara 69 (265); Ryan Harris 3/54 (22 overs)

Match drawn
Pallekele International Cricket Stadium, Pallekele, Sri Lanka
Umpires: Richard Kettleborough (Eng) and Tony Hill (NZ)
Player of the match: Michael Hussey (Aus)

- Sri Lanka won the toss and elected to bat.
- Match delayed by bad light on Day 1. Match delayed by rain on 2nd, 3rd and 4th days. Match delayed by bad light on Day 2 and 5, resulting in stumps.
- Seekkuge Prasanna (SL) and Shaun Marsh (Aus) made their Test debuts.

Ricky Ponting missed this test. Ponting's wife, Rianna, gave birth to the couple's second child, and he returned to Australia to witness the event. As a result, Shaun Marsh made his debut and he scored 141 off 315 balls.

Australia lead the series 1–0

=== 3rd Test ===
16–20 September 2011
Scorecard

Australia	v	Sri Lanka
316 (104.3 overs); Michael Hussey 118 (178); Shaminda Eranga 4/65 (23.3 overs)		473 (174 overs); Angelo Mathews 163* (269); Peter Siddle 4/91 (35 overs)
488 (138.5 overs); Phillip Hughes 126 (220); Rangana Herath 7/157 (52 overs)		7/0 (2 overs); Tharanga Paranavitana 4* (6)

Match drawn
Sinhalese Sports Club Cricket Ground, Colombo, Sri Lanka
Umpires: Aleem Dar (Pak) and Tony Hill (NZ)
Player of the match: Michael Hussey (Aus)

- Sri Lanka won the toss and elected to field.
- Match delayed by rain, a wet outfield and bad light on Day 1. Match delayed by bad light resulting in stumps on Day 2.
- Shaminda Eranga (SL) made his Test debut.
- Kumar Sangakkara (SL) played in his 100th Test.

On the first day Shaminda Eranga got his first wicket in tests with his first ball (repeating Nathan Lyon's feat in the 1st test); his victim was Shane Watson. Also on the first day Shaun Marsh achieved an average of 222 before he got out, the highest ever by an Australian. Michael Hussey was Man of the Match for all three test matches and was awarded Man of the Series.

Australia won the series 1-0
