= Welsford, Nova Scotia =

Welsford, Nova Scotia may refer to one of the following places:

- Welsford, Kings, Nova Scotia
- Welsford, Pictou, Nova Scotia
