= Sri Lankan cricket team in Australia in 2012–13 =

	Australia	Sri Lanka
- Dates: 6 December 2012 – 28 January 2013
Captains	Michael Clarke / George Bailey (ODI)	Mahela Jayawardene

Test series
- Result: Australia won the 3-match series 3–0
Most runs	Michael Clarke (316)	Tillakaratne Dilshan (208)
Most wickets	Peter Siddle (15)	Rangana Herath (12)
- Player of the series: Michael Clarke

One Day International series
- Results: 5-match series drawn 2–2
Most runs	Phillip Hughes (257)	Tillakaratne Dilshan (152)
Most wickets	Clint McKay (8)	Nuwan Kulasekara (11)
- Player of the series: Nuwan Kulasekara

Twenty20 International series
- Results: Sri Lanka won the 2-match series 2–0
Most runs	David Warner (97)	Mahela Jayawardene (69)
Most wickets	Glenn Maxwell (3); Xavier Doherty (3)	Nuwan Kulasekara (2); Thisara Perera (2)

The Sri Lankan cricket team toured Australia from 6 December 2012 to 28 January 2013. The tour consisted of three Tests, five One Day Internationals (ODIs) and two Twenty20 Internationals (T20Is). Tests were played for the Warne–Muralidaran Trophy. The Test series was preceded by a match against the Cricket Australia Chairman's XI and Sri Lankans.

Australia won the test series in a 3-0 whitewash, the ODI series was drawn 2-2 and Sri Lanka won the T20I series 2-0.

Sri Lanka's Kumar Sangakkara scored his 10,000th career run in the Melbourne Test, tying the record for the fastest player to achieve the milestone.

Australian cricketer Michael Hussey retired from Test cricket after the final test in Sydney.

== Background ==
Immediately prior to the series, Australia played a home series against South Africa, and lost the series 1-0. At the end of that series, Ricky Ponting, the second highest run scorer in Tests and former Test captain, retired.

Meanwhile, Sri Lanka enjoyed some success at a home series against New Zealand, winning an ODI series and drawing a Test series 1-1.

== Squads ==
On 20 November 2012, Sri Lanka announced a 16-man Test squad.

Australia announced a 12-man squad for the first Test in Hobart on 6 December 2012. Phillip Hughes was selected to replace Ricky Ponting, who retired after the preceding South African series. Jackson Bird (to replace the injured Ben Hilfenhaus) and Usman Khawaja (to cover for Michael Clarke) were the additions after to the Australian squad the first Test. Glenn Maxwell was picked to replace vice-captain Shane Watson after he was injured in the Boxing Day Test. Lahiru Thirimanne and Suranga Lakmal were called up for the final test.

Sri Lanka announced a squad for the limited overs series on 2 January 2013, while Australia announced a squad (for the first two ODIs) on 6 January 2013, Mike Hussey was not picked, while Michael Clarke, David Warner, Shane Watson and Matthew Wade were rested. Before the start of the second ODI, Mitchell Starc was replaced by Kane Richardson after complaining of calf soreness. The rested Australian players (excluding Shane Watson) returned to the squad after the 2nd ODI. Jackson Bird was added for cover after the 3rd ODI.

Australia announced a squad for the T20I series on 21 January 2013.

Tests		ODIs		T20Is	
Australia	Sri Lanka	Australia	Sri Lanka	Australia	Sri Lanka
Michael Clarke (c); Shane Watson (vc); Ed Cowan; Ben Hilfenhaus*; Phillip Hughes; Michael Hussey; Mitchell Johnson; Nathan Lyon; Peter Siddle; Mitchell Starc; Matthew Wade (wk); David Warner; Jackson Bird*; Usman Khawaja**; Glenn Maxwell	Mahela Jayawardene (c); Angelo Mathews (vc); Tillakaratne Dilshan; Kumar Sangakkara (wk); Tharanga Paranavitana; Thilan Samaraweera; Prasanna Jayawardene (wk); Rangana Herath; Nuwan Kulasekara; Shaminda Eranga; Suraj Randiv; Dinesh Chandimal (wk); Chanaka Welagedara; Nuwan Pradeep; Dhammika Prasad; Dimuth Karunaratne; Lahiru Thirimanne; Suranga Lakmal	Michael Clarke (c); George Bailey (c); Phillip Hughes; Usman Khawaja; Aaron Finch; David Hussey; Brad Haddin (wk); Glenn Maxwell; Steven Smith; Mitchell Johnson; Ben Cutting; Mitchell Starc; Clint McKay; Xavier Doherty; Kane Richardson***; David Warner; Matthew Wade (wk); Moises Henriques; Jackson Bird	Mahela Jayawardene (c); Angelo Mathews (vc); Tillakaratne Dilshan; Upul Tharanga; Lahiru Thirimanne; Dinesh Chandimal (wk); Lasith Malinga; Nuwan Kulasekara; Thisara Perera; Akila Dananjaya; Ajantha Mendis; Jeevan Mendis; Suranga Lakmal; Rangana Herath; Kusal Perera (wk); Shaminda Eranga	George Bailey (c); Ben Cutting; Xavier Doherty; James Faulkner; Aaron Finch; Ben Laughlin; Shaun Marsh; Glenn Maxwell; Mitchell Starc; Adam Voges; Matthew Wade (wk); David Warner	Angelo Mathews (c); Mahela Jayawardene; Tillakaratne Dilshan; Upul Tharanga; Lahiru Thirimanne; Dinesh Chandimal (wk); Lasith Malinga; Nuwan Kulasekara; Thisara Perera; Akila Dananjaya; Ajantha Mendis; Jeevan Mendis; Suranga Lakmal; Rangana Herath; Kusal Perera (wk); Shaminda Eranga

- * Replaced the injured Ben Hilfenhaus after the first Test.
- ** Was added as cover for Michael Clarke in the final two tests
- *** Replaced Mitchell Starc after the first ODI

== Tour matches ==
=== CA Chairman's XI v Sri Lankans ===
6–8 December
Scorecard

CA Chairman's XI	v	Sri Lankans
6/439d (100 overs); Scott Henry 207* (283); Dhammika Prasad 2/128 (20 overs)		6/396 (109 overs); Tillakaratne Dilshan 101 (152); Ashton Turner 2/93 (22 overs)

Match drawn
Manuka Oval, Canberra
Umpires: Gerard Abood (Aus) and Geoff Joshua (Aus)

- Cricket Australia Chairman's XI won the toss and elected to bat.
- Dilshan retired out on 101

== Test series (Warne–Muralitharan Trophy) ==
=== 1st Test ===
14–18 December 2012
Scorecard

Australia	v	Sri Lanka
5/450d (131 overs); Mike Hussey 115* (184); Chanaka Welegedara 3/130 (26 overs)		336 (109.3 overs); Tillakaratne Dilshan 147 (273); Peter Siddle 5/54 (25.3 overs)
9/278d (73.5 overs); David Warner 68 (119); Rangana Herath 5/96 (21.5 overs)		255 (119.2 overs); Kumar Sangakkara 63 (226); Mitchell Starc 5/63 (28.2 overs)

Australia won by 137 runs
Bellerive Oval, Hobart
Umpires: Tony Hill (NZ) and Nigel Llong (Eng)
Player of the match: Peter Siddle (Aus)

- Australia won the toss and elected to bat
- Play was delayed by rain on Days 2, 3, 4 and 5

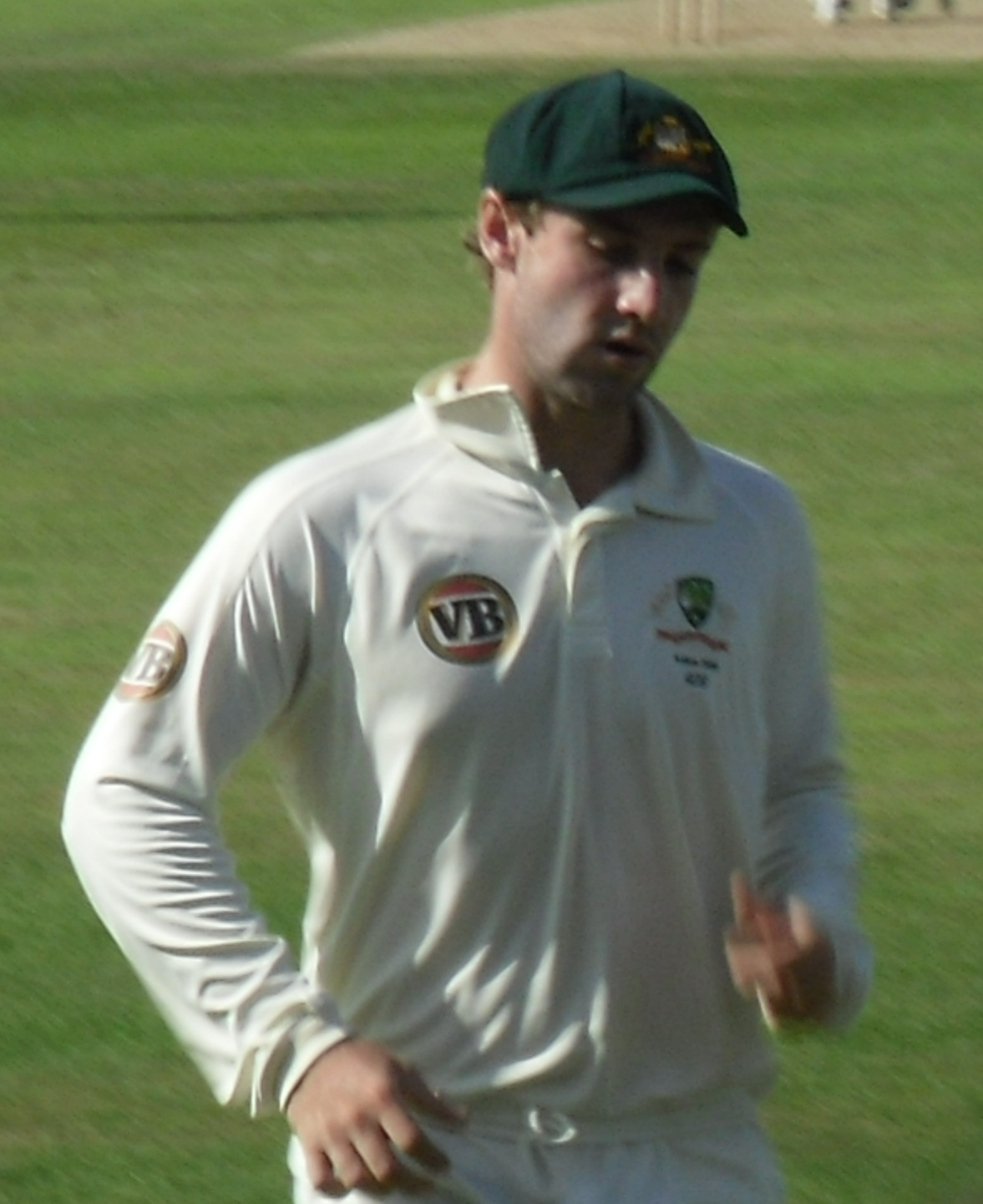
Phillip Hughes was given a Test recall.

Before the start of the Test, the Blundstone Arena pitch was criticized because it had produced many low scores during Sheffield Shield matches earlier in the season.

Match Report:

Day 1

Australia won the toss and chose to bat. David Warner and Phillip Hughes batted together for most of the morning session, before Warner (57) was run out just before lunch. After lunch, Hughes and Shane Watson put on a partnership, before Sri Lanka dismissed both with a wicket on either side of tea. Michael Clarke and Mike Hussey added 101 runs in the evening session, and at stumps Australia was 4/299.

Day 2

Rain delayed the start of Day 2 by 50 minutes. After the rain cleared, Sri Lanka dismissed Michael Clarke (74). After lunch, about two and half hours of play was lost due to more rain. After the resumption, Hussey (115*) and Matthew Wade (68*) combined for an unbeaten 146 run partnership, before Clarke declared at 5/450. Sri Lanka's experienced top order failed to build a platform, and Sri Lanka finished the day at 4/87, with Tillakaratne Dilshan not out 50.

Day 3

Sri Lanka made a brisk start to Day 3 and Tillakaratne Dilshan made his second century against Australia. Dilshan (147) and Angelo Mathews (75) added 161 runs for the fifth wicket, before both were dismissed either side of tea. Prasanna Jayawardene (40) and Nuwan Kulasekara (23) added useful runs in the lower order, and Sri Lanka was bowled out for 336, a deficit of 114 runs. Peter Siddle was the best of the bowlers, taking 5/54, and fast bowler Ben Hilfenhaus left the field with a side strain, and did not bowl again in the game. Australia survived fourteen overs before stumps, and finished at 0/27.

Day 4

The Australian openers, David Warner (68) and Ed Cowan (56) resumed and made a solid 132 run partnership before a collapse saw Australia fall from 0/132 to 5/181. Michael Clarke (58 retired hurt) and Michael Hussey (31*) took Australia's total to 278, setting a target of 393 for victory. Sri Lanka lost its openers early and at the close of play finished at 2/65.

Day 5

On the last day, the pitch deteriorated with uneven bounce, and Australia was short one bowler due to Ben Hilfenhaus' injury. Attempting to save the Test, Sri Lanka lost only Sangakkara (63) and Mahela Jayawardene (19) before the tea break, but Thilan Samaraweera (49) and Mathews (19), the last two recognised batsmen fell shortly after the tea break; all four of those wickets fell to Peter Siddle (4/50). The last four wickets fell to Mitchell Starc (5/63) over the following hour of play, and Australia won the match by 137 runs inside the final hour of play.

Peter Siddle was named the Man of the match for his match figures of 9/104. There was minor controversy when broadcast footage of the match appeared to show Siddle ball tampering, but the issue was quickly cleared up without any formal complaint against him. Siddle was later cleared by the International Cricket Council (ICC).

=== 2nd Test ===
26–30 December 2012
Scorecard

Sri Lanka	v	Australia
156 (43.4 overs); Kumar Sangakkara 58 (98); Mitchell Johnson 4/63 (14 overs)		460 (134.4 overs); Michael Clarke 106 (187); Dhammika Prasad 3/106 (26 overs)
103 (24.2 overs); Angelo Mathews 35 (48); Mitchell Johnson 2/16 (8 overs)

Australia won by an innings and 201 runs
Melbourne Cricket Ground, Melbourne
Umpires: Aleem Dar (Pak) and Nigel Llong (Eng)
Player of the match: Mitchell Johnson (Aus)

- Sri Lanka won the toss and elected to bat
- Jackson Bird (Aus) made his Test debut.
- Sangakkara (broken thumb) retired hurt on 27 while Prasanna Jayawardene (broken thumb) and Chanaka Welegedara (torn hamstring) were absent hurt in the second innings

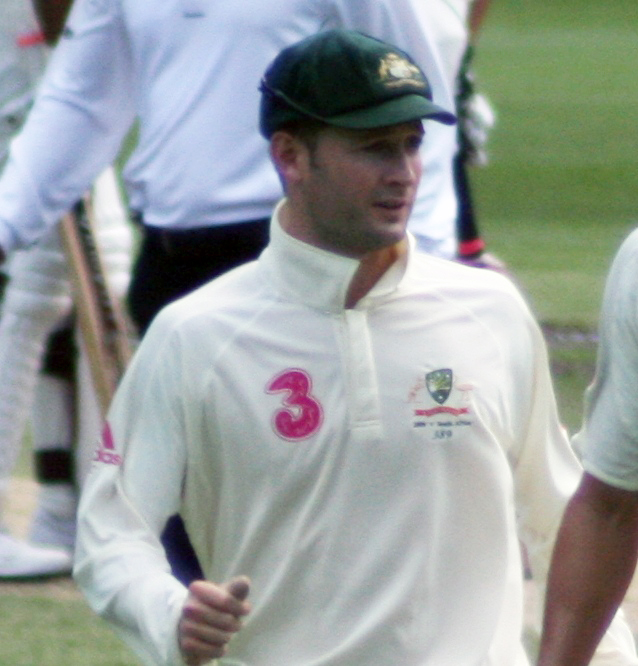
Michael Clarke finished his record-breaking calendar year with a century.

Match Report:

Day 1

Sri Lanka won the toss and chose to bat. Australian bowler Jackson Bird made his Test Match debut and took the wicket of Dimuth Karunaratne on his tenth ball in Test cricket. Sri Lanka collapsed and was all out for 156; the only highlight for Sri Lanka was top-scorer Kumar Sangakkara (58), who surpassing 10,000 career Test runs in the innings. Mitchell Johnson took 4/63 for Australia. In reply, the Australian openers scored 95 in only 18 overs before David Warner (62) was dismissed. At stumps, Australia was 150/3.

Day 2

Australia batted throughout the second day, with a century to Michael Clarke (106) and half-centuries to Shane Watson (83) and Mitchell Johnson (73* at stumps). At stumps, Australia was 8/440, a lead of 284 runs. Michael Clarke broke Ricky Ponting's record for most runs in a calendar year for an Australian, and Sri Lankan fast bowler Chanaka Welegedara tore his hamstring while bowling and was ruled out for the series.

Day 3

Australia added twenty more runs at the start of Day 3, before being dismissed for 460, a lead of 304 runs; Mitchell Johnson finished not out 92. Sri Lanka's collapsed to 3/3 inside the first two overs, and was dismissed shortly after lunch in the 25th over for 103 (with Welegedara and Prasanna Jayawardene absent hurt and Sangakkara retired hurt), giving Australia a dominant victory by an innings and 201 runs.

=== 3rd Test ===
3–7 January 2013
Scorecard

Sri Lanka	v	Australia
294 (87.4 overs); Lahiru Thirimanne 91 (151); Jackson Bird 4/41 (19.4 overs)		9/432d (107 overs); Matthew Wade 102* (158); Rangana Herath 4/95 (31 overs)
278 (81.2 overs); Dinesh Chandimal 62* (106); Mitchell Johnson 3/34 (15 overs)		5/141 (42.5 overs); Ed Cowan 36 (88); Rangana Herath 3/46 (16.5 overs)

Australia won by 5 wickets
Sydney Cricket Ground, Sydney
Umpires: Aleem Dar (Pak) and Tony Hill (NZ)
Player of the match: Jackson Bird (Aus)

- Australia won the toss and elected to bowl.

Former England cricket captain and Australia's Nine Network commentator Tony Greig, who died between the second and third Tests, was farewelled with a minute's silence and tributes from the commentary team before the match.

Match Report

Day 1

Australia won the toss and chose to bowl, and took wickets at regular intervals throughout the day. Lahiru Thirimanne (91) and captain Mahela Jayawardene (72) both scored half-centuries, but the largest partnership was only 62 runs. Sri Lanka was bowled out at stumps for 294. Jackson Bird took 4/41 for Australia.

Day 2

Australia batted solidly to take its total to 4/271 early in the evening session, with David Warner (85), Phillip Hughes (87) and Michael Clarke (50) all scoring half-centuries. At stumps, Australia was 6/342, with a lead of 48 runs, and with Matthew Wade not out 47*.

Day 3

In the morning session, Matthew Wade (102*) batted with the tail to make the second century of his Test career, and to take Australia to 9/432, at which point Michael Clarke declared with a lead of 138 runs. Rangana Herath (4/95) was the best of Sri Lanka's bowlers in the first innings.

In reply, Dimuth Karunaratne (85) and Mahela Jayawardene (60) added 108 runs for the second wicket, taking Sri Lanka to 1/132; but after Karunaratne was dismissed, Sri Lanka lost 5/46, eventually finishing at 7/225 at stumps, a lead of 87 runs.

Day 4

Dinesh Chandimal (62*) batted with the tail to take Sri Lanka's score to 278, and to set Australia a target of 141; Bird (3/76) and Mitchell Johnson (3/34) each took three wickets for Australia.

In the run chase, David Warner was out first ball, and Hughes (34) was dismissed shortly after lunch to leaving Australia at 2/45. But top-scorer Ed Cowan (36) and Michael Clarke (29) put on a 59 run partnership for the third wicket, which was enough of a platform for Australia to reach the target with five wickets in hand. Herath (3/47) was again Sri Lanka's leading wicket taker for the innings.

The Man of the Match award went to Jackson Bird (4/41 & 3/75).

== ODI series ==
=== 1st ODI ===
11 January 2013
14:20 (D/N)
Scorecard

Australia; 5/305 (50 overs)	v	Sri Lanka; 198 (40 overs)
Phillip Hughes 112 (129); Angelo Mathews 1/46 (8 overs)		Dinesh Chandimal 73 (95); Clint McKay 4/33 (8 overs)

Australia won by 107 runs
Melbourne Cricket Ground, Melbourne
Umpires: Richard Kettleborough (Eng) and Paul Reiffel (Aus)
Player of the match: Phillip Hughes (Aus)

- Australia won the toss and elected to bat.
- Aaron Finch, Phillip Hughes and Usman Khawaja (all Aus) made their ODI debuts.
- Phillip Hughes became the first Australian batsman to score a century on debut in an ODI.

Match Report

Australia won the toss and elected to bat. Three debutants were named in the XI for Australia.

Australia made a steady start to the innings (0/53) before Aaron Finch (16) and Usman Khawaja (3) were dismissed. Phillip Hughes and skipper George Bailey (89) amassed a 140-run partnership with Hughes (112) making a century on debut. Some late hitting from David Hussey (60*) saw Australia post a score of 5/305.

Sri Lanka began the innings with two early wickets, before Tillakaratne Dilshan and Dinesh Chandimal steadied the innings to take the score to 2/111. Dilshan (51) was then run out, and shortly afterwards, Glenn Maxwell inflicted two run-outs in successive balls (including Lahiru Thirimanne for a diamond duck) to reduce Sri Lanka to 5/128 in the 30th over. Sri Lanka was ultimately dismissed for 198 in the 40th over, with Dinesh Chandimal (73) top-scoring, and Clint McKay (4/33) finishing with the best bowling figures. Phillip Hughes was named Man of the match for his century on debut.

=== 2nd ODI ===
13 January 2013
13:50 (D/N)
Scorecard

Australia; 170 (46.5 overs)	v	Sri Lanka; 2/172 (40.1 overs)
Brad Haddin 50 (67); Lasith Malinga 3/32 (9 overs)		Lahiru Thirimanne 102* (134); Ben Cutting 1/42 (10 overs)

Sri Lanka won by 8 wickets (with 59 balls remaining)
Adelaide Oval, Adelaide
Umpires: Marais Erasmus (SA) and Simon Fry (Aus)
Player of the match: Lahiru Thirimanne (SL)

- Sri Lanka won the toss and elected to field.
- Play was delayed by wet outfield, no overs lost
- Ben Cutting, Kane Richardson (both Aus) and Kusal Perera (SL) made their ODI debuts.

Match Report

Sri Lanka won the toss and chose to field, and immediately took advantage of seaming conditions, reducing Australia to 2/12 after seven overs, and then to 6/83 in the 25th over. Brad Haddin (50) managed to bat with the tail and extend the innings into the 47th over, before Australia was ultimately dismissed for 170 runs. Lasith Malinga (3/32) had the best bowling figures, and Angelo Mathews (2/24) Nuwan Kulasekara (1/24) both took wickets and bowled economically.

Despite losing Upul Tharanga for a duck in the first over of its run chase, Sri Lanka had little difficulty chasing Australia's total, reaching the target in the 41st over with eight wickets in hand. Lahiru Thirimanne (102*) scored his maiden ODI and List A century, and Tillakaratne Dilshan (51) made a half-century. Thirimanne was named Man of the Match.

=== 3rd ODI ===
18 January 2013
13:20 (D/N)
Scorecard

Australia; 74 (26.4 overs)	v	Sri Lanka; 6/75 (20 overs)
Mitchell Starc 22* (28); Nuwan Kulasekara 5/22 (10 overs)		Kusal Perera 22* (28); Mitchell Johnson 3/11 (3 overs)

Sri Lanka won by 4 wickets (with 180 balls remaining)
Brisbane Cricket Ground, Brisbane
Umpires: Richard Kettleborough (Eng) and Paul Reiffel (Aus)
Player of the match: Nuwan Kulasekara (SL)

- Australia won the toss and elected to bat.
- Australia were all out for 74, which was its 3rd lowest ODI total in a completed innings

Match Report

Australia won the toss and chose to bat, but humid conditions meant that the game was dominated by swing bowling. Nuwan Kulasekara took five wickets between the 5th and 11th overs of Australia's innings to reduce Australia to 6/30; he finished with 5/22 from ten overs. Lasith Malinga then took three wickets between the 15th and 19th overs to reduce Australia to 9/40; he finished with 3/14 from five overs. Mitchell Starc (22*) and Xavier Doherty (15) added 34 runs for the last wicket to take Australia's score to 74. They were the only batsmen to register a double-figure score.

In reply, Sri Lanka took its total to 1/33, before Mitchell Johnson (3/11) took three wickets between the 10th and 12th overs to reduce Sri Lanka to 4/37. Sri Lanka lost two more wickets late in its small run chase, reaching the target after 20 overs with four wickets in hand.

Kulasekara was named Man of the Match.

=== 4th ODI ===
20 January 2013
14:20 (D/N)
Scorecard

Australia; 9/222 (50 overs)	v	Sri Lanka; 0/14 (3.2 overs)
David Warner 60 (73); Nuwan Kulasekara 3/30 (10 overs)		Tillakaratne Dilshan 9* (9)

No result
Sydney Cricket Ground, Sydney
Umpires: Marais Erasmus (SA) and Paul Reiffel (Aus)

- Australia won the toss and elected to bat.
- Play was delayed by rain after 3.2 overs, later abandoned due to a wet outfield

Match Report

Australia won the toss and chose to bat. Australia was reduced to 3/53 in the 13th over, with both Phillip Hughes (1) and David Hussey (1) dismissed cheaply; much of the early damage with the ball was done by Nuwan Kulasekara (3/30) taking two wickets and Lasith Malinga (2/33). From there, Australia lost wickets at regular intervals, with David Warner (60) top-scoring. Australia managed to bat out the full 50 overs, and 40 runs were added in an unbroken tenth wicket partnership to take the score to 9/222, with Mitchell Starc (52*) providing the most significant lower order contribution.

In the run chase, play was delayed by rain after 20 balls were bowled. Three hours later, the umpires abandoned the match due to a wet outfield.

=== 5th ODI ===
23 January 2013
14:20 (D/N)
Scorecard

Australia; 5/247 (50 overs)	v	Sri Lanka; 215 (48.3 overs)
Phillip Hughes 138* (154); Tillakaratne Dilshan 1/22 (7 overs)		Angelo Mathews 67 (79); Xavier Doherty 3/21 (8 overs)

Australia won by 32 runs
Blundstone Arena, Hobart
Umpires: Simon Fry (Aus) and Richard Kettleborough (Eng)
Player of the match: Phillip Hughes (Aus)

- Sri Lanka won the toss and elected to field.

Match Report

Sri Lanka won the toss and chose to field. The Australian openers made a solid start (0/31) before two quick wickets left them at 2/37 after 10 overs. Phillip Hughes and George Bailey steadied the innings before Bailey (17) was caught and bowled in the 27th over. A 98-run stand followed between Phillip Hughes and David Hussey (34), and late hitting from Australia saw them post a score of 5/247. Hughes finished unbeaten on 138, his second ODI century for the series, and in his career.

Sri Lanka got of to a brisk start (0/57), with Mahela Jayawardene quickly getting to 38, before suffering a top order collapse to 4/77; Xavier Doherty (3/21) took three of these wickets. Angelo Mathews scored 67 runs to help Sri Lanka to 5/187 in the 44th over, but Sri Lanka was eventually bowled out for 215, with Moises Henriques (3/32) and Clint McKay (2/51) taking the wickets of the tail-enders.

Hughes was named Man of the Match.

== T20I series ==
=== 1st T20I ===
26 January 2013
19:35 (D/N)
Scorecard

Australia; 3/137 (20 overs)	v	Sri Lanka; 5/139 (18.5 overs)
David Warner 90* (62); Nuwan Kulasekara 1/21 (4 overs)		Angelo Mathews 35* (27); Glenn Maxwell 2/15 (3 overs)

Sri Lanka won by 5 wickets
Stadium Australia, Sydney
Umpires: Simon Fry (Aus) and Paul Reiffel (Aus)
Player of the match: David Warner (Aus)

- Australia won the toss and elected to bat.
- Ben Cutting (Aus) and Kusal Perera (SL) made their T20I debuts.

=== 2nd T20I ===
28 January 2013
19:35 (D/N)
Scorecard

Sri Lanka; 4/161 (20 overs)	v	Australia; 3/119 (15 overs)
Mahela Jayawardene 61 (45); Glenn Maxwell 1/23 (4 overs)		Shaun Marsh 47* (40); Nuwan Kulasekara 1/18 (3 overs)

Sri Lanka won by 2 runs (D/L method)
Melbourne Cricket Ground, Melbourne
Umpires: Simon Fry (Aus) and John Ward (Aus)
Player of the match: Thisara Perera (SL)

- Australia won the toss and elected to field.
- Australia were set a revised target of 122 runs from 15 overs due to rain.

== Statistics ==
=== Australia ===
Tests

- Michael Hussey made his 19th Test century when he scored 115* in the 1st innings of the 1st Test.
- Peter Siddle took his 6th five wicket haul in Sri Lanka's 1st innings of the 1st Test.
- Mitchell Starc took his 2nd five wicket haul in Sri Lanka's 2nd innings of the 1st Test.
- Jackson Bird took his 1st Test wicket when he dismissed Dimuth Karunaratne in the 1st innings of the 2nd Test.
- Mitchell Johnson took his 200th Test wicket when he dismissed Kumar Sangakkara in the 1st innings of the 2nd Test.
- Michael Clarke made his 22nd Test century when he scored 106 in the 1st innings of the 2nd Test.
- David Warner surpassed 1,000 career Test runs when he scored 85 in the first innings of the 3rd Test.
- Matthew Wade made his 2nd Test century (1st in Australia) when he scored 102* in the first innings of the 3rd Test.

ODI's

- Phillip Hughes made his 1st ODI century on debut in the 1st ODI.
- Ben Cutting took his 1st ODI wicket when he dismissed Tillakaratne Dilshan in the 2nd ODI.
- Phillip Hughes made his 2nd ODI century in the 5th ODI.

T20I's

- James Faulkner took his first T20I wicket when he dismissed Tillakaratne Dilshan in the 2nd T20I.

=== Sri Lanka ===
Tests

- Chanaka Welegedara took his 50th Test wicket when he dismissed Shane Watson in the 1st innings of the 1st Test.
- Tillakaratne Dilshan made his 15th Test century when he scored 147 in the 1st innings of the 1st Test.
- Kumar Sangakkara surpassed 10,000 career Test runs when he scored 58 in the 1st innings of the 2nd Test.

ODI's

- Lahiru Thirimanne made his 1st ODI and List A century when he scored 102* in the 2nd ODI.
- Nuwan Kulasekara took his 1st five wicket haul in the 3rd ODI.

T20I's

== Player statistics ==
=== Australia ===
Test Statistics
Player	Tests	Runs	Batting average	Wickets	Bowling average
Michael Clarke (c)	3	316	79.00	0	
Shane Watson (vc)	2	118	39.33	2	56.00
Ed Cowan	3	136	27.20		
Ben Hilfenhaus	1	0	0.00	1	30.00
Phillip Hughes	3	233	46.60		
Michael Hussey	3	232	116.00	0	
Mitchell Johnson	2	106	106.00	9	19.00
Nathan Lyon	3	16	5.33	7	43.85
Peter Siddle	3	55	18.33	15	16.93
Mitchell Starc	2	7	3.50	10	28.70
Matthew Wade (wk)	3	191	63.66	0	
David Warner	3	272	54.40	0	
Jackson Bird	2	6	6.00	11	16.18

ODI Statistics
Player	ODIs	Runs	Batting average	SR	Wickets	Bowling average	RPO
Michael Clarke (c)	2	29	14.50	63.04			
George Bailey (c)	5	154	30.80	74.03			
Phillip Hughes	5	257	64.25	80.56			
Usman Khawaja	1	3	3.00	27.27			
Aaron Finch	2	20	10.00	46.51			
David Hussey	5	128	32.00	99.22	0		4.80
Brad Haddin (wk)	2	60	60.00	75.00			
Glenn Maxwell	3	22	7.33	66.66	0		5.78
Steven Smith	1	8	8.00	72.72	0		4.00
Mitchell Johnson	4	12	6.00	29.26	7	14.14	4.50
Ben Cutting	1	27	27.00	60.00	1	42.00	4.20
Mitchell Starc	4	74		113.84	3	33.00	4.24
Clint McKay	5	6	2.00	20.00	8	21.37	4.56
Xavier Doherty	5	30	30.00	56.60	3	32.00	4.17
Kane Richardson	1	0	0.00	0.00	0		2.50
David Warner	3	74	24.66	72.54			
Matthew Wade (wk)	3	62	20.66	60.78			
Moises Henriques	3	14	7.00	63.63	3	13.00	3.25

==== Sri Lanka ====
Test Statistics
Player	Tests	Runs	Batting average	Wickets	Bowling average
Mahela Jayawardene (c)	3	166	27.66		
Angelo Mathews (vc)	3	175	29.16	2	58.50
Tillakaratne Dilshan	3	208	34.66	3	61.66
Kumar Sangakkara (wk)	2	152	50.66		
Thilan Samaraweera	3	79	13.16		
Prasanna Jayawardene (wk)	2	85	28.33		
Rangana Herath	3	48	9.60	12	33.91
Nuwan Kulasekara	1	32	16.00	0	
Shaminda Eranga	2	15	7.50	5	50.40
Dinesh Chandimal (wk)	1	86	86.00		
Chanaka Welagedara	2	0	0.00	6	42.83
Nuwan Pradeep	1	26	26.00	2	64.00
Dhammika Prasad	2	34	8.50	3	53.00
Dimuth Karunaratne	3	140	23.33		
Lahiru Thirimanne	1	98	49.00		
Suranga Lakmal	1	5	2.50	1	113.00

ODI Statistics
Player	ODIs	Runs	Batting average	SR	Wickets	Bowling average	RPO
Mahela Jayawardene (c)	5	48	16.00	75.00			
Angelo Mathews (vc)	5	79	26.33	84.04	4	43.50	4.46
Tillakaratne Dilshan	5	152	38.00	61.29	1	39.00	3.54
Upul Tharanga	3	13	4.33	50.00			
Lahiru Thirimanne	5	110	36.66	65.47			
Dinesh Chandimal (wk)	3	79	39.50	69.29			
Lasith Malinga	5	3	3.00	42.85	10	18.90	4.10
Nuwan Kulasekara	5	32	32.00	123.07	11	16.90	3.79
Thisara Perera	5	15	7.50	93.75	5	37.00	5.78
Ajantha Mendis	2	0	0.00	0.00	2	51.50	5.77
Jeevan Mendis	5	48	16.00	67.60	0		6.66
Rangana Herath	2	2	2.00	40.00	2	35.50	3.55
Kusal Perera (wk)	4	50	50.00	67.56			
Shaminda Eranga	1				1	12.00	4.50

== Broadcasters ==
Country	TV Broadcaster(s)
Australia	Nine Network
Australia	Fox Sports
United Kingdom	Sky Sports
Pakistan	PTV Sports
India	STAR Cricket
South Africa	SuperSport
