= Rob Baker (cricketer) =

Australian cricketer (born 1975)

Robert Michael Baker (born 24 July 1975) is an Australian former first-class cricketer who played for Western Australia. He played as a right-handed batsman and occasional slow left-arm orthodox bowler.

He showed great promise as a junior cricketer – being a skillful middle-order batsman and handy bowler. He represented the Australian Under 19 side in 1993 and 1994 (as captain) and attended the Commonwealth Bank Cricket Academy in 1994. He became a regular in the Western Australian side, but a debilitating onset of chronic fatigue syndrome forced him from the game when he was only 26 years old.

Baker was the second player and first Western Australian to take a hat-trick in a domestic one-day match.
