= Sri Lankan cricket team in Australia in 1987–88 =

International cricket tour

The Sri Lanka national cricket team toured Australia in the 1987-88 season and played 1 Test match against Australia. This was the first time that Australia and Sri Lanka had played each other in Test cricket in Australia.

== Test series summary ==
12–15 February 1988
(5-day match)
Scorecard

Australia	v	Sri Lanka
455 (137.2 overs); DM Jones 102 (174); JR Ratnayeke 4/98 (40 overs)		194 (82.3 overs); A Ranatunga 55 (169); SR Waugh 4/33 (20 overs)
		153 (f/o) (52.1 overs); A Ranatunga 45 (65); MG Hughes 5/67 (21 overs)

Australia won by an innings and 108 runs
Western Australia Cricket Association Ground, Perth
Umpires: RC Bailhache and PJ McConnell
Player of the match: DM Jones (AUS)

- Australia won the toss and elected to bat.
- The match was scheduled for five days but completed in four.
- CPH Ramanayake (SL) made his Test debut.

== External sources ==
- CricketArchive
