= Darryl Smith (cricketer) =

Australian cricketer

Personal information
- Full name: Darryl Donald Smith
- Born: 8 June 1960 (age 66); Adelaide, South Australia, Australia
- Batting: Right-handed
- Bowling: Right-arm medium
- Role: All-rounder

Domestic team information
- Years: Team
- 1981–1985: Western Australia

Career statistics
Competition	FC	LA
Matches	1	4
Runs scored	2	43
Batting average	1.00	21.50
100s/50s	0/0	0/0
Top score	2	42
Balls bowled	36	156
Wickets	2	6
Bowling average	14.50	23.83
5 wickets in innings	0	0
10 wickets in match	0	n/a
Best bowling	2/29	4/24
Catches/stumpings	1/-	2/-
- Source: CricketArchive, 16 December 2012

Darryl Donald Smith (born 8 June 1960) is a former Australian cricketer who played several matches for Western Australia during the early 1980s.

Born in Adelaide, South Australia, Smith played colts and under-19 cricket for Western Australia, and was subsequently chosen to captain the Australian under-19 cricket team in two Tests and one One Day International against the touring England under-19 side during the 1978–79 season.

A right-handed all-rounder bowling medium pace, he debuted at state level during the 1980–81 season, playing a single match for Western Australia in the limited-overs McDonald's Cup. In the match, played against Victoria at the WACA Ground in February 1981, Smith scored 42 runs from 23 balls, an innings which included three sixes. He again played one match for Western Australia in the following season's competition, and subsequently spent the 1982 English season playing for the Accrington Cricket Club in the Lancashire League. His season as the club's professional was not entirely successful—from 26 matches, he took 45 wickets at an average of 21.26, but scored only 382 runs at an average of 18.19, with one century and no half-centuries.

Smith did not again play for Western Australia until the 1984–85 season, when he played two limited-overs matches, as well as his first and only first-class match. His sole first-class match was played against the touring Sri Lankans, and he took two wickets in Sri Lanka's first innings.

== See also ==
- List of Western Australia first-class cricketers
