= Tim Welsford =

Australian cricketer

Personal information
- Full name: Timothy Harold Welsford
- Born: 22 April 1982 (age 44); Bendigo, Victoria, Australia
- Batting: Right-handed
- Bowling: Right-arm fast-medium

Domestic team information
- Years: Team
- 2005/06: Victoria
- LA debut: 14 November 2005 Victoria v Western Australia
- Last LA: 11 December 2005 Victoria v Queensland

Career statistics
Competition	List A
Matches	5
Runs scored	12
Batting average	6.00
100s/50s	0/0
Top score	10
Balls bowled	36
Wickets	0
Bowling average	–
5 wickets in innings	–
10 wickets in match	–
Best bowling	–
Catches/stumpings	0/–
- Source: CricketArchive, 9 February 2010

Timothy Harold Welsford (born 22 April 1982) was a professional cricketer who captained the Australia Under-19 cricket team in one Under-19 Test match and three Under-19 One Day Internationals. He also made five List A appearances for Victoria in 2004 and 2005.
