= Sri Lankan cricket team in Australia in 2004 =

	Australia	Sri Lanka
- Dates: 1 July – 13 July 2004
Captains	Adam Gilchrist; Ricky Ponting	Marvan Atapattu

Test series
- Result: Australia won the 2-match series 1–0
Most runs	Matthew Hayden (288)	Marvan Atapattu (156)
Most wickets	Glenn McGrath (10); Shane Warne (10)	Upul Chandana (12)
- Player of the series: Matthew Hayden (Aus)

The Sri Lankan national cricket team toured Australia in July 2004, well outside the normal Australian cricket season. Two Test matches were played, Australia winning the series 1–0.

== Test series ==
=== 1st Test ===
1–3 July 2004
Scorecard

Australia	v	Sri Lanka
207 (71.3 overs); Darren Lehmann 57 (107); Chaminda Vaas 5/31 (18.3 overs)		97 (41.5 overs); Tillakaratne Dilshan 17* (59); Glenn McGrath 5/37 (15 overs)
201 (63.1 overs); Adam Gilchrist 80 (123); Lasith Malinga 4/42 (15.1 overs)		162 (65.4 overs); Mahela Jayawardene 44 (114); Michael Kasprowicz 7/39 (17.4 overs)

Australia won by 149 runs
Marrara Oval, Darwin
Umpires: Aleem Dar (Pak) and Billy Bowden (NZ)
Player of the match: Glenn McGrath (Aus)

- Sri Lanka won the toss and elected to field.
- Lasith Malinga (SL) made his Test debut

=== 2nd Test ===
9–13 July 2004
Scorecard

Australia	v	Sri Lanka
517 (124.2 overs); Justin Langer 162 (285); Upul Chandana 5/109 (26 overs)		455 (144.4 overs); Marvan Atapattu 133 (268); Jason Gillespie 3/116 (37.4 overs)
292/9d (66.4 overs); Matthew Hayden 132 (169); Upul Chandana 5/101 (18.4 overs)		183/8 (85 overs); Kumar Sangakkara 66 (173); Shane Warne 4/70 (37 overs)

Match drawn
Cazaly's Stadium, Cairns
Umpires: Aleem Dar (Pak) and Billy Bowden (NZ)
Player of the match: Matthew Hayden (Aus)

- Sri Lanka won the toss and elected to field.
