= Cricket in Australia =

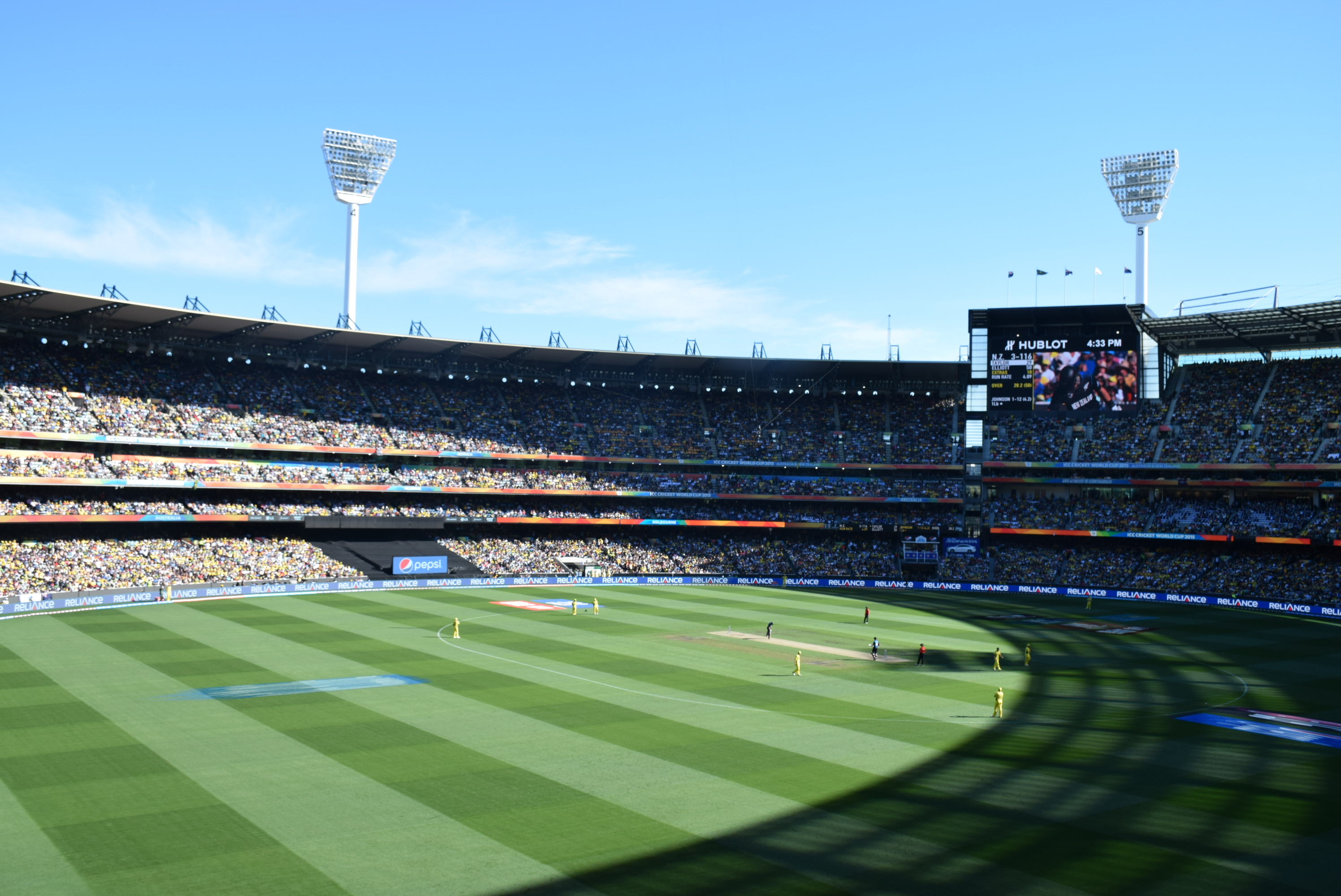
- The MCG hosting the 2015 Cricket World Cup Final between Australia and New Zealand
- Country: Australia
- Governing body: Cricket Australia
- National teams: Australia Men; Australia Women; Australia U-19 Men; Australia U-19 Women; Australia A Men
- First played: December 1803, Sydney
- Registered players: 541,743 (adult); 156,089 (child)

National competitions
- List: First Class Cricket; Sheffield Shield; List A Cricket; One-Day Cup; Women's National Cricket League; T20 Cricket; Big Bash League; Women's Big Bash League

Club competitions
- List: Victorian Premier Cricket; NSW Premier Cricket; South Australian Premier Cricket; Queensland Premier Cricket; Western Australian Premier Cricket; Cricket Tasmania Premier League

International competitions
- List: Men’s national team; ICC World Test Championship: Champions (2021-2023); Cricket World Cup: Champions (1987, 1999, 2003, 2007, 2015, 2023); ICC Men's T20 World Cup: Champions (2021); ICC Champions Trophy: Champions (2006, 2009); Commonwealth Games: Silver Medal (1998); Men’s U-19 national team; Under-19 Cricket World Cup: Champions (1988, 2002, 2010, 2024); Women's national team; Women's Cricket World Cup: Champions (1978, 1982, 1988, 1997, 2005, 2013, 2022); ICC Women's World Twenty20: Champions (2010, 2012, 2014, 2018, 2020, 2023); Commonwealth Games: Gold Medal (2022); Women's U-19 national team; Under-19 Women's T20 World Cup: Semi-final (2023)

Audience records
- Single match: Test (overall): 373,691 – Australia v India, 4th Test, December 2024, Melbourne Cricket Ground Test (day): 91,092 – Australia v England, Day 1 (26 December), 4th test 2013/14, Melbourne Cricket Ground ODI: 93,013 – Australia v New Zealand, 29 March 2015, 2015 Cricket World Cup Final, Melbourne Cricket Ground

Cricket is the most popular summer sport in Australia at international, domestic, and local levels. It is widely played across the country, especially from the months of September to April. It was one of the first of Australia's mainstream sports to be established, having begun in the Colony of New South Wales as early as December 1803. The peak administrative body for both professional and amateur cricket is Cricket Australia.

Australia has approximately 8 million cricket fans, which is nearly one in three Australians. Ausplay in 2024 reports that 541,743 adults and 156,089 children play cricket in Australia. Less than a quarter of all players are female. Separately, official audience data shows that 93.6% of Australians watched at least some cricket on TV in 2010–11 calendar year.

As of February 2026, Australia is ranked first in the ICC Men's Test Team Rankings. Australia is ranked first in the ICC women's ODI Team Rankings 2025 with a rating of 168.

== History ==
=== 1803–1939 ===
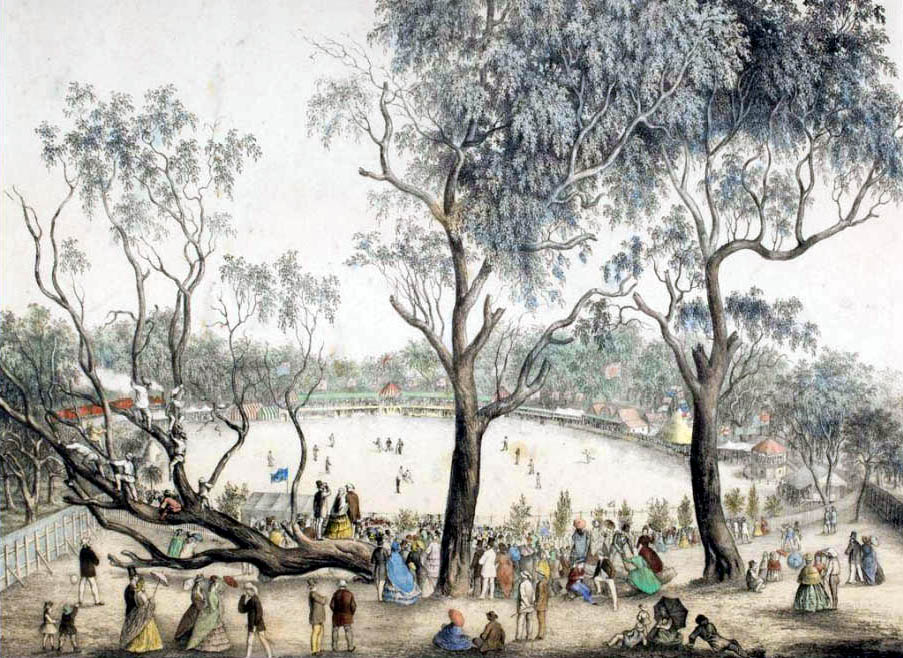
Cricket at the MCG in 1864

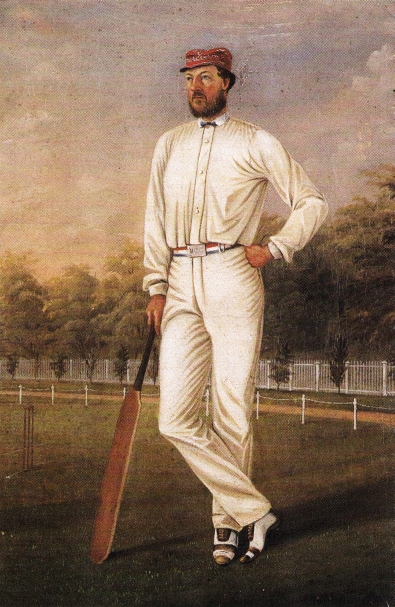
Tom Wills was Australia's greatest cricketer in the era before Test cricket.

Cricket has been played in Australia for over 210 years. The first recorded cricket match in Australia took place in Sydney in December 1803 and a report in the Sydney Gazette on 8 January 1804 suggested that cricket was already well established in the infant colony. Intercolonial cricket in Australia started with a visit by cricketers from Victoria to Tasmania in February 1851. The match was played in Launceston on 11–12 February with Tasmania winning by 3 wickets.

The first tour by an English team to Australia was in 1861–62, organised by the catering firm of Spiers and Pond as a private enterprise. A further tour followed in 1863–64, led by George Parr and was even more successful than the last.

In 1868, a team consisting of Aboriginal cricketers became the first Australian team to tour England. The team played 47 matches, winning 14, drawing 19 and losing 14. The heavy workload and inclement weather took its toll with King Cole contracting a fatal case of tuberculosis during the tour.

Further tours by English teams took place in 1873–74 (featuring the most notable cricketer of the age W. G. Grace) and 1876–77. The 1876–77 season was notable for a match between a combined XI from New South Wales and Victoria and the touring Englishmen at the Melbourne Cricket Ground played on 15–19 March. This match, later to be recognised as the first Test match, was won by Australia by 45 runs thanks mainly to an unbeaten 165 by Charles Bannerman. The result of this match was seen by Australians and Englishmen as a reflection of the rising standard of Australian cricket.

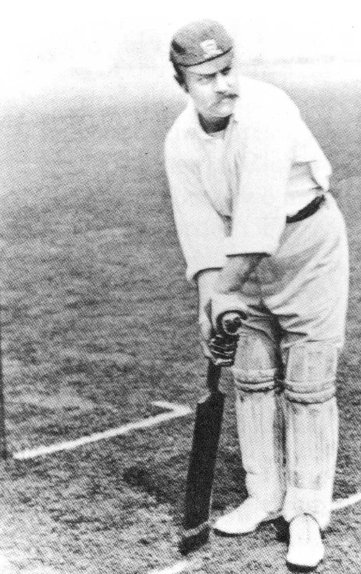
Billy Murdoch, who captained the Australia team during the first Ashes test in 1882

The rising standards of Australian cricket was further established during the first representative tour of England in 1878. A return visit in 1878–79 is best remembered for a riot and by the time Australia visited England in 1880, playing the first Test in England at The Oval, a system of international tours was well established. A famous victory on the 1882 tour of England resulted in the placement of a satirical obituary in an English newspaper, The Sporting Times. The obituary stated that English cricket had died, and the body will be cremated and the ashes taken to Australia. The English media then dubbed the next English tour to Australia (1882–83) as the quest to regain The Ashes. The Sheffield Shield, the premier first-class cricket competition in Australia, was established in 1892 by the Australasian Cricket Council, the first attempt at a national cricket board.

The era from the mid-1890s to World War I has been described as Australian cricket's golden age. This era saw the emergence of players such as Monty Noble, Clem Hill and in particular Victor Trumper, who was idolised by the Australian public.

The founding mother of organised women's cricket in Australia was the young Tasmanian, Lily Poulett-Harris, who captained the Oyster Cove team in the league she created in 1894. Lily's obituary, from her death a few years later in 1897, states that her league was almost certainly the first to be formed in the colonies.

World War I led to the suspension of both international and Sheffield Shield cricket and the enlistment of many cricketers in the AIF. After the war, a team consisting of cricketers enlisted in the AIF toured the United Kingdom.

International cricket recommenced with a tour by a weakened England team in 1920–21. The strong Australian team, led by Armstrong and with a bowling attack spearheaded by Gregory and Ted McDonald won the series 5–0, the first time this was achieved in an Ashes series. Don Bradman, born in Cootamundra and raised in Bowral was 20 when he made his Test debut in the first Test of the 1928–29 series against England. He would hold the records for the highest individual Test innings and the most centuries in Test cricket and when he retired in 1948 he had the highest Test batting average, the last a record he still holds. He scored 117 first class centuries, still the only Australian to score a century of centuries and was knighted for services to cricket.

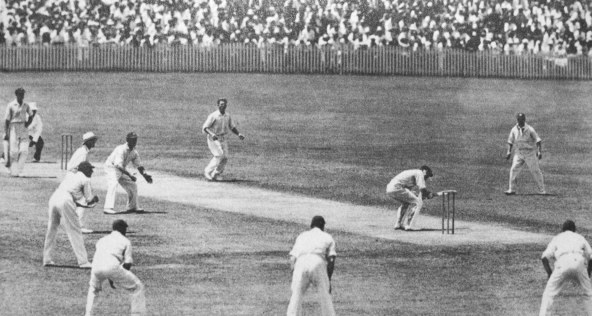
Bodyline bowling in Brisbane, 1932

The Bodyline controversy began when Bradman toured England with the Australian team in 1930. Bradman scored heavily, 974 runs at an average of 139.14 including a then world record 334 at Leeds, two other double centuries and another single. Watching these displays of batting was Douglas Jardine, playing for Surrey. Following discussions with other observers such as Percy Fender and George Duckworth, he developed a tactic to limit the prodigious run scoring of Bradman and the others. The tactic, originally called fast leg theory and later called bodyline involved fast short pitched bowling directed at the batsman's body and a packed leg side field. Appointed captain of England for the 1932–33 series in Australia, Jardine was able to put these theories into practice. Combined with bowlers of the speed and accuracy of Harold Larwood and Bill Voce, the tactic required batsmen to risk injury in order to protect their wicket. In the third Test in Adelaide, Larwood struck Australian captain Bill Woodfull above the heart and fractured wicket-keeper Bert Oldfield's skull.

In December 1934, the Australian women's team played the English women in the first women's Test match at the Brisbane Exhibition Ground. Despite a 7 wicket haul to Anne Palmer in the first innings, the English women were too strong and won by 9 wickets.

=== 1945–1969 ===
Once again, war brought a stop to Shield and Test cricket as Australia mobilised for World War II. Immediately after the end of the war in Europe in 1945, an Australian Services XI played a series of Victory Tests in England. The team was captained by Lindsay Hassett and it saw the emergence of the charismatic all-rounder Keith Miller. The series was drawn 2–2. After the retirement of Bradman in 1948, Hassett, Miller and all-rounder Ray Lindwall formed the nucleus of the Australian team. They were later joined by leg spinning all-rounder, Richie Benaud and batsman Neil Harvey.

By the 1958–59 series, Benaud was captain of the Australian side and managed to recover the Ashes. The 1960–61 series at home against the West Indies was widely regarded as one of the most memorable. A commitment by Benaud and his West Indian counterpart Frank Worrell to entertaining cricket revived lagging interest in the sport. The gripping series, including the first tied Test, saw Australia win 2–1 and become the inaugural holders of the newly commissioned Frank Worrell Trophy. The West Indian team was held in such affection that a ticker-tape parade in their honour prior to their departure from Australia attracted a crowd of 300,000 Melburnians to wish them farewell.

In the late 1950s and early 1960s, there was an ongoing controversy regarding illegal bowling actions. A number of bowlers, Australian and international were accused of throwing or "chucking" over this period including the South Australian pair of Alan Hitchcox and Peter Trethewey and New South Welshman, Gordon Rorke. The controversy reached a high point when Ian Meckiff was recalled to the Australian team for the first Test of the 1963–64 series against South Africa. Called on to bowl his first over, he was no-balled 4 times by umpire Colin Egar for throwing before being removed from the attack by his skipper, Benaud. As a consequence, Meckiff retired from all levels of cricket after the match and Egar received death threats from persons aggrieved at his call.

=== 1970–present ===
The 1970s saw players and administrators once again come into conflict. Poor scheduling saw Australia visit South Africa immediately after a tour to India in 1969–70. This would be the last tour to South Africa prior to the application of international sporting sanctions designed to oppose the policy of apartheid. The tired Australians came across a very strong South African team in conditions vastly different from the subcontinent, and were subsequently beaten 4–0. A request by the Australian Cricket Board for the players to play a further match in South Africa was met with resistance by the players, led by the captain, Bill Lawry. During the following home series against England, Lawry was sacked as captain and replaced by the South Australian batsman, Ian Chappell. Lawry remains the only Australian captain to be sacked in the middle of a Test series.

Greg Chappell, Ian's younger brother, succeeded him as captain in 1975–76 and led the Australian team in the Centenary Test in Melbourne in March 1977. A celebration of 100 years of Test cricket, Australia won the Test by 45 runs, the precise result of the corresponding game 100 years earlier.

While Australian cricket celebrated, the Australian media tycoon Kerry Packer was making plans to wrest away the television rights for Australian cricket. During the 1977 Ashes tour, the cricket world became aware that Packer had signed 35 of the world's top cricketers for a series of matches, including 18 Australians, 13 of whom were part of the tour party. World Series Cricket, as the breakaway group was known split Australian cricket in two for nearly three years. Former Australian captain, Bob Simpson was recalled from retirement to lead an inexperienced team in a home series against India in 1977–78, won 3–2 and then a tour to the West Indies, marred by an ugly riot. For the 1978–79 Ashes series, he was replaced by the young Victorian, Graham Yallop. The subsequent thrashing, a 5–1 victory for England, and the success of World Series Cricket forced the Australian Cricket Board to concede on Packer's terms.

The settlement between the ACB and WSC led to the introduction of a series of innovations including night cricket, coloured clothing and an annual limited overs tri-series called the World Series Cup. It also signalled the return of the champion cricketers Greg Chappell, Dennis Lillee and Rod Marsh. Their retirement at the end of the 1983–84 season was quickly followed by a series of tours to South Africa by a rebel Australian team in breach of the sporting sanctions imposed on the apartheid regime. The combined effect was to leave Australian cricket at its nadir under reluctant captain, Allan Border, losing Test series at home (2–1) and away (1–0) to New Zealand in 1985–86.

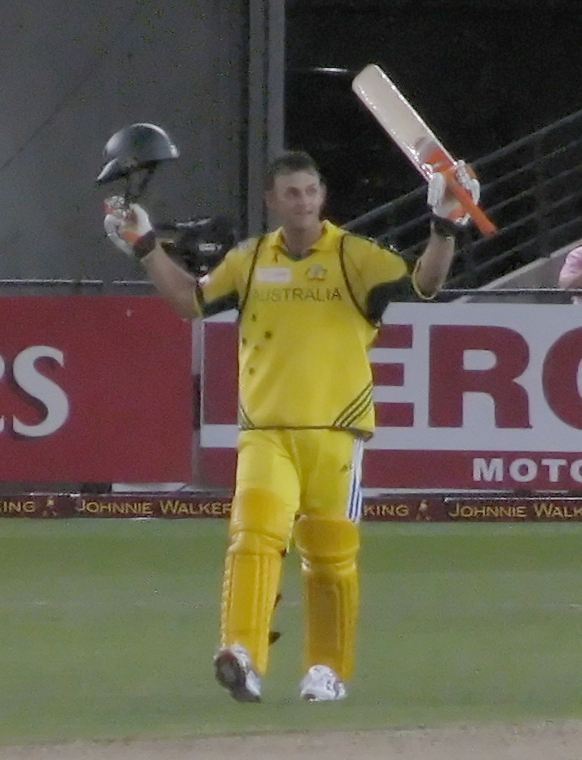
Adam Gilchrist celebrating scoring a century against the World XI in the second ICC Super Series 2005 match at Telstra Dome (7 October 2005)

The long road back for Australian cricket started in India in 1986–87. Border, along with Bob Simpson in a new role as coach, set out to identify a group of players that a team could form around. These players showed some of the steel necessary in the famous tied Test at the M. A. Chidambaram Stadium in Chennai. Returning to the subcontinent for the World Cup in 1987, Australia surprised the cricket world by defeating England at Eden Gardens in Kolkata to win the tournament with a disciplined brand of cricket. By the 1989 Ashes tour, the development of players such as Steve Waugh and David Boon and the discovery of Mark Taylor and Ian Healy had reaped rewards. The 4–0 drubbing of England was the first time since 1934 that Australia had recovered the Ashes away from home and marked the resurgence of Australia as a cricketing power. Australia would hold the Ashes for the next 16 years.

The most successful leg-spinbowler in the history of the game, Shane Warne, made his debut in 1991–92 in the third Test against India at the Sydney Cricket Ground. He had an undistinguished Test debut, taking 1/150 off 45 overs, and recording figures of 1/228 in his first Test series. From this modest beginning, Warne dominated Australian cricket for 15 years, taking 708 wickets at an average of 25.41. When the fast medium bowler, Glenn McGrath was first selected in the Australian team for the Perth test against New Zealand in 1993–94, the core of a highly successful bowling attack was formed. In 1994–95, under new captain Taylor, the Australians defeated the then dominant West Indies in the Caribbean to recover the Frank Worrell Trophy for the first time since 1978 and staked a claim to be considered the best team in the world.

Following a disappointing World Cup at home in 1992, Australia then entered a run of extraordinarily successful World Cup campaigns; runners up to Sri Lanka in 1996 in the subcontinent, fighting back after early setbacks to win in England in 1999 and unbeaten on their way to another victory in South Africa. The change in captain from Taylor to Steve Waugh made little difference in the success of the Australian team. Waugh made a slightly rocky start to his term as captain, drawing 2–2 with the West Indies in the Caribbean and losing to Sri Lanka 1–0 away. A victory in the Australian team's first ever Test match against Zimbabwe was the start of an unparalleled 16 Test winning streak. The streak was finally ended in 2001 in Kolkata with a remarkable victory by India after being asked to follow-on. For Waugh, India would remain unconquered territory.

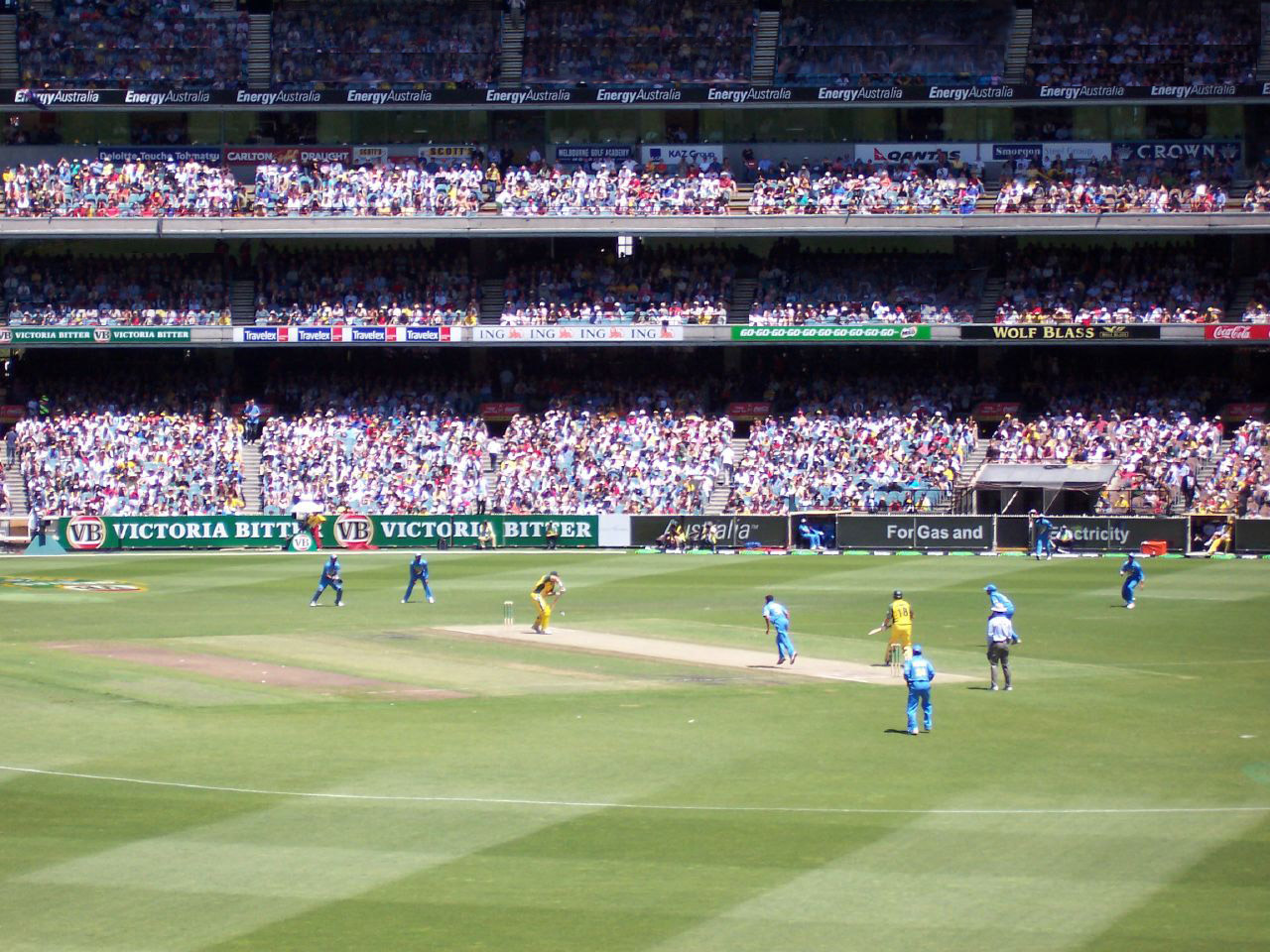
MCG during an ODI match between Australia and India in 2004

Australia's success was not without its detractors. Accusations of racism were made against the Australian team, one incident leading to a suspension for Darren Lehmann in 2003. Contacts between Warne and batsman Mark Waugh and illegal bookmakers, at first kept under cover by the ACB, were later revealed by the Australian press, sparking accusations of hypocrisy given Australian cricket's earlier attitude toward match fixing allegations. Warne would later be suspended from all forms of cricket for 12 months after testing positive to banned diuretics hydrochlorothiazide and amiloride. The brand of cricket played by the Australian team was praised for its spirit and aggressiveness but critics charged that this aggressive approach led to ugly sledging incidents such as the confrontation between McGrath and West Indian batsman, Ramnaresh Sarwan at the Antigua Recreation Ground in 2003. Tasmanian batsman Ricky Ponting would admit to an alcohol problem after incidents in India and in Sydney.

A rehabilitated Ponting would succeed Waugh as captain in 2004. While injured for most of the 2004–05 series against India, his team under acting captain Adam Gilchrist defeated India in India, the first Australian series win in India since Bill Lawry's team in 1969–70. A 2–1 defeat in the 2005 Ashes series in England was quickly avenged at home with a 5–0 thrashing of England in 2006–07. The whitewash was the first in an Ashes series since Warwick Armstrong's team in 1920–21. Following the series, the successful bowling combination of McGrath and Warne retired from Test cricket, with a record that was hard to match. Australia won the 2007 Cricket World Cup under Ricky Ponting in the Caribbean and were unbeaten through the tournament. Australian cricketer Matthew Hayden scored the most runs in the tournament. The finals happened to be Glenn McGrath's last match and he was also the highest wicket taker of the tournament and the player of the tournament.

The 2015 Cricket World Cup was jointly hosted by Australia and New Zealand from 14 February to 29 March 2015. Fourteen teams played 49 matches in 14 venues, with Australia staging 26 games at grounds in Adelaide, Brisbane, Canberra, Hobart, Melbourne, Perth and Sydney. Australia defeated New Zealand by 7 wickets to win their fifth ICC Cricket World Cup in front of a record crowd of 93,013. The winning captain Michael Clarke, retired from ODIs with immediate effect after the final match.

Australia also hosted the 2022 T20 World Cup from 16 October to 13 November. In total, 45 games where played across the nation, located in all capital cities except Canberra, as well as Geelong. Australia played 5 games, winning 3, losing 1 against New Zealand and having 1 abandoned. The country finished 3rd in their group, missing out on the semi-finals.

== Administration ==
The Cricket Australia (CA) is the principal national governing body of cricket in Australia. Its headquarters is situated at the Jolimont, Melbourne. The CA is involved in talent development through grassroots programs and cricket academies. Its initiatives include infrastructure development, coaching, and player welfare programs designed to maintain and enhance Australia's competitive performance internationally.

The CA was established in 1905 as the Australian Board of Control for International Cricket. It is incorporated as an Australian Public Company, limited by guarantee.

== National teams ==
The Australia national cricket team is governed by the Cricket Australia (CA) and is a member of the East Asia-Pacific. Since 1909, the CA has been affiliated with ICC, the international governing body for world cricket.

=== Performance ===
The following list includes the performance of all of Australia's national teams at major competitions.

==== Men's senior team ====
The Australian senior national team is considered the world’s most successful team across formats, including winning six Cricket World Cups.

Tournament	Appearance in finals	Last appearance	Best performance
ICC Men's Cricket World Cup	8 out of 13	2023	Champions (1987, 1999, 2003, 2007, 2015, 2023)
ICC Men's T20 World Cup	2 out of 9	2024	Champions (2021)
ICC Champions Trophy	2 out of 8	2017	Champions (2006, 2009)
ICC World Test Championship	2 out of 3	2023–25	Champions (2021-2023)
Commonwealth Games	1 out of 1	1998	Silver Medal (1998)

==== Women's senior team ====
Tournament	Appearance in finals	Last appearance	Best performance
ICC Women's Cricket World Cup	9 out of 12	2022	Champions (1978, 1982, 1988, 1997, 2005, 2013, 2022)
ICC Women's T20 World Cup	7 out of 9	2024	Champions (2010, 2012, 2014, 2018, 2020, 2023)
Commonwealth Games	1 out of 1	2022	Gold Medal (2022)

==== Men's U-19 team ====
Tournament	Appearance in finals	Last appearance	Best performance
ICC Under-19 Cricket World Cup	6 out of 15	2024	Champions (1988, 2002, 2010, 2024)

==== Women's U-19 team ====
Tournament	Appearance in finals	Last appearance	Best performance
Under-19 Women's T20 World Cup	0 out of 1	2023	Semi-final (2023)

== Affiliated state associations ==
=== Full members ===
No.	Name	Represents	CEO
1	Cricket NSW	New South Wales	Lee Germon
2	Queensland Cricket	Queensland	Terry Svenson
3	South Australian Cricket Association	South Australia	William Rayner
4	Cricket Tasmania	Tasmania	
5	Cricket Victoria	Victoria	Nick Cummins
6	Western Australian Cricket Association	Western Australia	John Stephenson

=== Non-members (participating in CA tournaments) ===
No.	Name	Represents	CEO
1	Cricket ACT	Australian Capital Territory	Olivia Thornton
2	Northern Territory Cricket	Northern Territory	

=== Participation ===
Ausplay in 2024 reports that 541,743 adults and 156,089 children play cricket in Australia. Fewer than a quarter of all players are female.

The 2017–18 National Cricket Census showed 1,558,821 Australians engaged in cricket competitions or programs – an increase of 9% from the previous year. 30% of cricket's participants were female, and 6 in every 10 new participants were female, one of the highest participation growth figures. More than 2.3 million people attended the cricket during the 2017–18 summer, surpassing the record of 1.8 million set in 2016–17.

Region/state/territory	Registered adults 2023/24
(Australia) National	541,743
New South Wales	162,180
(Victoria (state)) Victoria	160,676
Queensland	81,240
Western Australia	58,618
South Australia	51,820
Tasmania	11,470
Australian Capital Territory	7,927
Northern Territory	7,813

== Organisation of cricket in modern Australia ==
=== International cricket ===
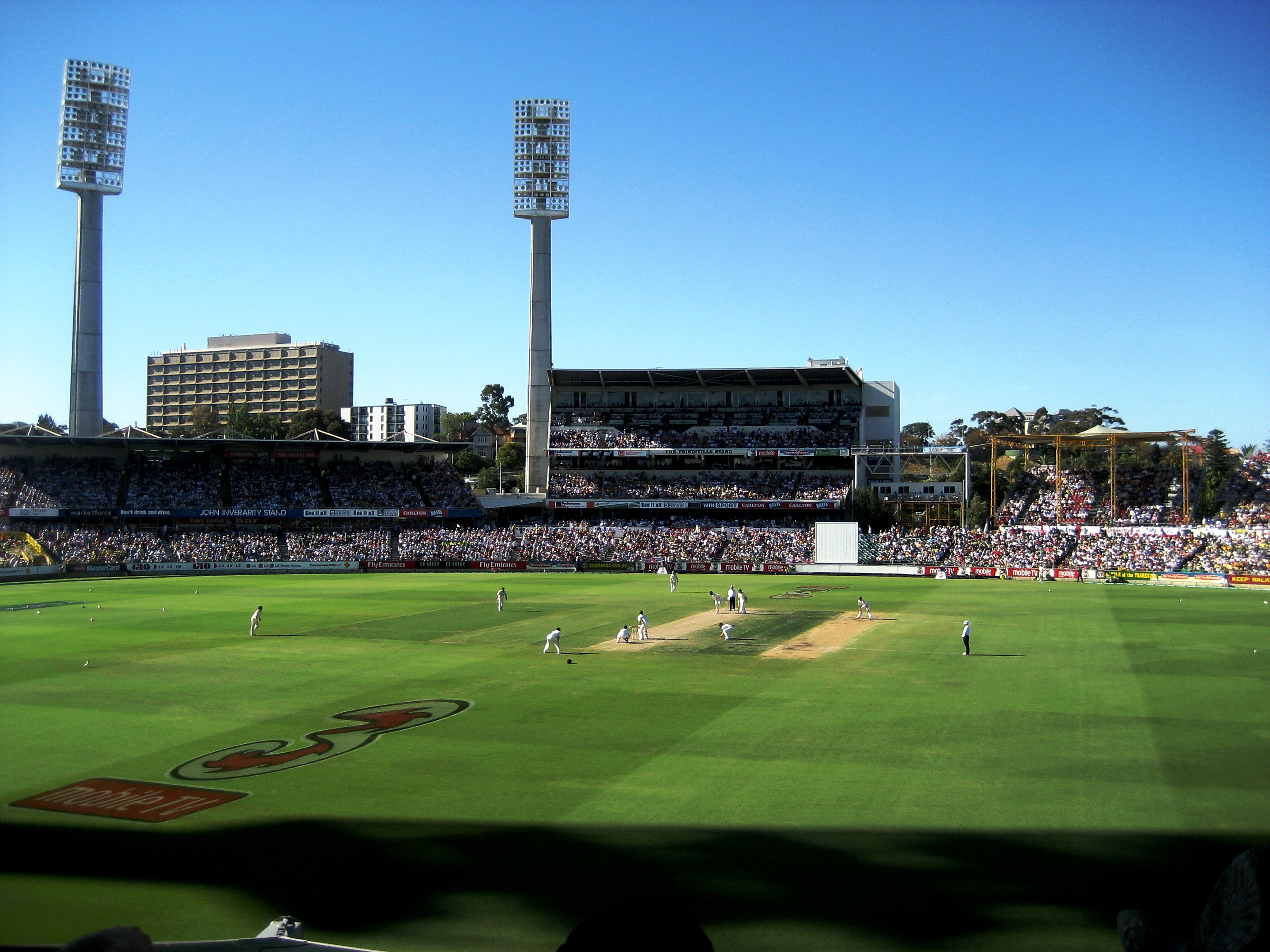
The 3rd test of the 2006–07 Ashes series, December 2006

The Australian national team is one of the most successful teams in international cricket. Along with England, Australia was recognised as one of the founder nations of the Imperial Cricket Conference, later the International Cricket Council. Australia generally plays a test series against a visiting team, and a one-day series between two other teams at home each summer, and tours overseas for the remainder of the year

==== Men's national team ====
Australia have been participating in international cricket since 1861 and competed in international tournament since the first ever the 1975 Cricket World Cup. The Australia national cricket team has also provided some of the greatest players to the world, the biggest example of which is Don Bradman. Australian cricket has a rich history. The Australian men's national team is currently ranked No. 1 in Tests, No. 2 in ODIs and at 2nd position in T20Is. Australia had won six World Championship cups (most by any country). In 1987 Australia won their first world cup under the captaincy of Allan Border. Recently in 2023, they had won their sixth title under the captaincy of Pat Cummins, which was won after a span of 8 years.

- Test International- On 15 March 1877, an Australian representative team played England in what would later be recognised as the first Test match. They are the most successful Test cricketing nation, with a higher percentage of won matches than any other nation. In Test cricket, the Australian team compete for various trophies and championships. The ICC Test Championship is an international competition run by the ICC for the 10 teams that play Test cricket. The competition is notional in the sense that it is simply a ranking scheme overlaid on all international matches that are otherwise played as part of regular Test cricket with no other consideration whatsoever. The most famous among all these trophies is The Ashes, which was played for the first time in 1882 between Australia and England. Other bilateral trophies have generally been named after the great players from the two competing nations.

Name of the trophy	Opponent	First played
ICC Test Championship	All Test teams	2003
The Ashes	England	1882
Border–Gavaskar Trophy	India	1996
Frank Worrell Trophy	West Indies	1960–61
Trans-Tasman Trophy	New Zealand	1985–86
Benaud-Qadir Trophy	Pakistan	2021–2022
Southern Cross Trophy	Zimbabwe	1999–2000
Warne–Muralidaran Trophy	Sri Lanka	2007–08

In late September 2021, Cricket Australia announced it would postpone its men's test match against Afghanistan indefinitely to prompt Afghanistan to rethink their approach to women's sports after media outlets reported that Taliban rulers would not allow women to play cricket. The match against the Afghan men's team was originally scheduled for Nov. 27 in Hobart.

- One Day International- The Australian team took part in the first one day international on 5 January 1971, once again also against England at the Melbourne Cricket Ground. Since then, the team has maintained a good record in one day internationals, winning six Cricket World Cups, more than any other national team.Following the end of World Series Cricket, from 1979 to 1980 the Australian season featured a triangular series of one day internationals, featuring the Australian team and two touring teams. The first incarnation of this tournament was called the World Series Cup and included night cricket, coloured uniforms and a white ball. In 1994–95, the tournament included an Australia A cricket team, due to the perceived weakness of the invited Zimbabwe team. For the 1996–97 season, the World Series Cup was replaced by a series of tournaments named after a major sponsor, including the Carlton & United Series, the VB Series and the Commonwealth Bank Series. The successor series followed a similar format.Australia and New Zealand co-hosted the 1992 Cricket World Cup, and the 2015 Cricket World Cup. In 1992, for the first time, the tournament featured the innovations already common in Australian one-day matches such as night cricket and coloured clothing. The tournament featured nine nations, expanded to include a South African team recently admitted back into world cricket. Australia despite starting firm favourites, performed poorly, failing to make the semi – final stage. Pakistan defeated England in the final in front of 87,182 spectators at the Melbourne Cricket Ground. The 2015 Cricket World Cup was the 11th Cricket World Cup, jointly hosted by Australia and New Zealand from 14 February to 29 March 2015. Fourteen teams played 49 matches in 14 venues, with Australia staging 26 games at grounds in Adelaide, Brisbane, Canberra, Hobart, Melbourne, Perth and Sydney. The final match of the tournament took place at the Melbourne Cricket Ground between co-hosts New Zealand and Australia in front of a record crowd of 93,013.

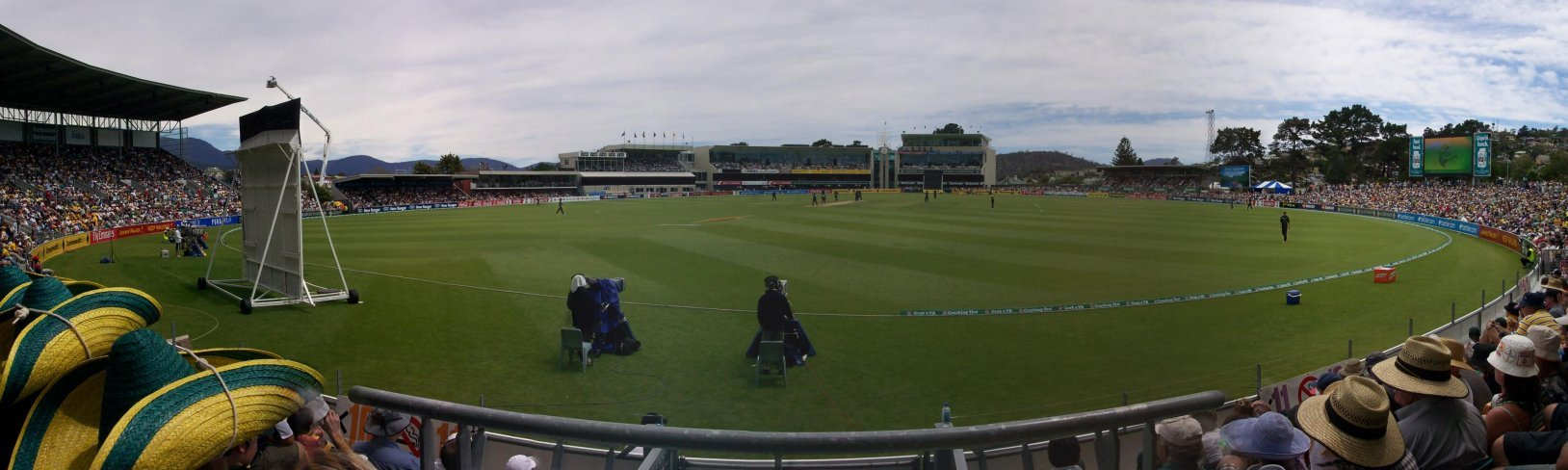
Australia vs New Zealand playing a one-day game at Bellerive Oval in Hobart, one of Australia's smaller international cricket grounds

- T20 International- Australia played there first T2O International in 2005 against New Zealand. In November 2021, Australia won their first-ever ICC Men's T20 World Cup held in United Arab Emirates, beating New Zealand by 8 wickets in the final.

==== Women's national team ====
There are currently 290,566 female participants in cricket. The Australia national women's cricket team competes internationally and has won the Women's Cricket World Cup five times, more than any other team. As in men's cricket, Australia and England were the first two women's Test nations, playing in the inaugural women's Test in Brisbane in 1934. Australia compete with England for the Women's Ashes, a cricket bat symbolically burned prior to the 1998 test series. The Australian team also compete in the Rose Bowl series, a series of one-day internationals against New Zealand. The Australian women's national team is currently ranked No. 1 in ODIs and at first position in T20Is.

- Test International -
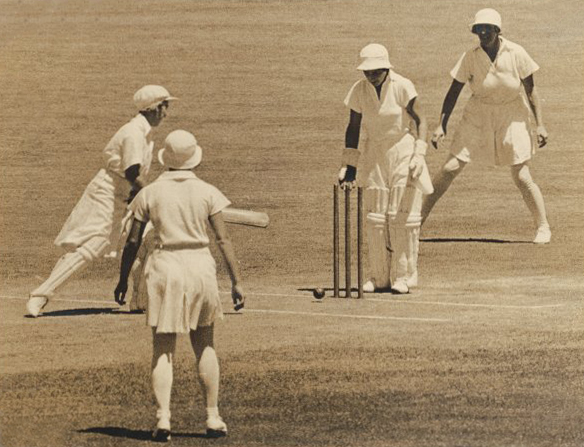
  Women's test cricket in 1935
  Australia made their debut as a Test playing nation in 1934 against England. In past time, Australia women's rarely play test. But in recent years they are playing more test matches.
- One Day International - Australia played their first ODI in 1978 against Young England and competed in international tournament since the first ever the 1973 Women's Cricket World Cup. They have clinched most number of Women's Cricket World Cup title. In the second edition of women's cricket world cup, Australia clinched their first ever title. Recently, in 2022 Australia have won their seventh world cup trophy.
- T20 International - Australia played their first T20 International in 2005 against England. Australia Women's have made great impact in T20 international from their early day of this format. They have clinched ICC Women's T20 World Cup trophy six times. In the second edition of t20 women's cricket world cup, Australia clinched their first ever title. Recently, in 2023 Australia have won their sixth T20 world cup trophy.

=== Domestic cricket ===
Team home grounds

On a domestic level, each of the six states has a cricket team.

==== Men's domestic cricket ====
===== First class competitions =====
- Sheffield Shield –The Sheffield Shield is the domestic first-class cricket competition in Australia. It was established in 1892 using a bequest of £150 provided by Lord Sheffield for the improvement of Australian cricket and was originally named the Sheffield Shield in recognition. When established, the competition included the colonies (later states) of New South Wales, South Australia and Victoria. Queensland was admitted to the Shield competition for the 1926–27 season, Western Australia in 1947–48 and Tasmania in 1977–78. In 1999, the Australian Cricket Board (now Cricket Australia) announced a 4-year sponsorship deal which included renaming the Sheffield Shield to the Pura Milk Cup, then to the Pura Cup the following season. As of the 2008–09 season, the title has reverted to its original name. At the end of the 2023-24 season, all participating teams have won at least one Sheffield Shield, with New South Wales the most successful state with 47 wins.

===== Limited overs competitions =====
- One-Day Cup –The Marsh One Day Cup is the domestic List A cricket (limited overs cricket) competition in Australia. It was established in 1969–70 and featured the state teams and a team from New Zealand. Originally a knock-out tournament, the format and name has changed several times since inception depending on the naming rights sponsor. New Zealand withdrew from the competition after the 1974–75 season. The Canberra Comets, a team from the Australian Capital Territory were included for three seasons from 1997 to 1998 to 1999–2000. At the end of the 2023-24 season, Western Australia has been the most successful state with 17 wins. In 2013, the format changed and all matches were held in Sydney at various grounds. It was broadcast live on GEM. The whole competition was held in the month of October, prior to the Sheffield Shield. However it has since moved back to being played from October to March and is now broadcast exclusively on the Pay TV network Foxtel and its streaming platform Kayo Sports.

=== Twenty20 cricket ===
- Big Bash League – The KFC Big Bash League or BBL, in short, is the Australian domestic Twenty20 cricket tournament, which was established in 2011. The Big Bash League replaced the previous competition, the KFC Twenty20 Big Bash, and features eight city-based franchises, instead of the six state-based teams which had competed before. Each state's capital city features one team, with Sydney and Melbourne featuring two. BBL matches are played in Australia during the summer in the months of December and January. It is now placed ninth in the list of most attended sports leagues in the world with respect to average crowd per match (2015–16 season). At the end of the 2023-24 season the Perth Scorchers are the most successful franchise with 6 wins.

Local club cricket is also popular, as well as social cricket which includes variations such as backyard and beach cricket.

==== Women's domestic cricket ====
===== Limited overs competitions =====
- Women's National Cricket League- The Women's National Cricket League (WNCL) is the national domestic 50-over competition for women's cricket in Australia. Featuring seven teams—one from every state, plus the Australian Capital Territory—each season's winner is awarded the Ruth Preddy Cup. New South Wales have historically dominated the competition, appearing in the first 24 title deciders and winning 20 championships.

===== Twenty20 competitions =====
- Women's Big Bash League- In 2007, the Australian Women's Twenty20 Cup was introduced, also featuring state representative teams. In 2015, it was replaced by the Women's Big Bash League, which features the same eight franchise teams as the men's competition.

== Stadiums ==
Nineteen different grounds in Australia have been used for international cricket (Tests, ODIs and Twenty20 Internationals). Five were only used once, during the 1992 World Cup, while three (all in Tasmania) only hosted games during 1980s World Series Cups. The main six used are:

Stadium name	Capacity	City	State	First used	Opponent
Melbourne Cricket Ground	100,024	Melbourne	Victoria	15 March 1877	England
Sydney Cricket Ground	48,000	Sydney	New South Wales	17 February 1882	England
Adelaide Oval	53,583	Adelaide	South Australia	12 December 1884	England
The Gabba	42,000	Brisbane	Queensland	27 November 1931	South Africa
Perth Stadium	60,000	Perth	Western Australia	28 January 2018	England
Bellerive Oval	19,500	Hobart	Tasmania	16 December 1989	Sri Lanka

Other grounds which have been used for Test cricket are:

Stadium name	Capacity	City	State	First used	Opponent
Brisbane Exhibition Ground	25,490	Brisbane	Queensland	30 November 1928	England
WACA Ground	20,000	Perth	Western Australia	11 December 1970	England
Marrara Oval	14,000	Darwin	Northern Territory	18 July 2003	Bangladesh
Cazaly's Stadium	13,500	Cairns	Queensland	25 July 2003	Bangladesh
Manuka Oval	12,000	Canberra	Australian Capital Territory	1 February 2019	Sri Lanka

Grounds which have been used for One Day Internationals only are:

Stadium name	Capacity	City	State	First used	Team 1	Team 2
TCA Ground	8,000	Hobart	Tasmania	10 January 1985	Sri Lanka	West Indies
NTCA Ground	10,000	Launceston	Tasmania	2 February 1986	New Zealand	India
Devonport Oval	14,000	Devonport	Tasmania	3 February 1987	England	West Indies
Harrup Park	10,000	Mackay	Queensland	28 February 1992	India	Sri Lanka
Eastern Oval	NA	Ballarat	Victoria	9 March 1992	England	Sri Lanka
Berri Oval	NA	Berri	South Australia	13 March 1992	Sri Lanka	West Indies
Lavington Sports Ground	20,000	Albury	New South Wales	18 March 1992	England	Zimbabwe
Docklands Stadium	53,359	Melbourne	Victoria	16 August 2000	Australia	South Africa

Grounds in Australia which have been used exclusively for the Twenty20 Internationals:

Stadium name	Capacity	City	State	First used	Team 1	Team 2
Stadium Australia	82,500	Sydney	New South Wales	1 February 2012	Australia	India
Kardinia Park	27,000	Geelong	Victoria	19 February 2017	Australia	Sri Lanka

== International competitions hosted ==
Competition	Edition	Winner	Final	Runners-up	Australia's position	Venues	Final venue	Stadium
Men's senior competitions
ICC Men's Cricket World Cup	1992 Cricket World Cup	Pakistan	249/6 (50 overs) – 227 (49.2 overs)	England	Round-Robin stage	18 (in 2 countries)	Melbourne Cricket Ground	
Under-19 Men's Cricket World Cup	1988 Youth Cricket World Cup	Australia	201 (49.3 overs) – 202/5 (45.5 overs)	Pakistan	Champions	8 (in 4 cities)	Adelaide Oval	
Under-19 Men's Cricket World Cup	2012 Under-19 Cricket World Cup	India	225/8 (50 overs) – 227/4 (47.4 overs)	Australia	Runners-up	9 (in 6 cities)	Tony Ireland Stadium	
ICC Men's Cricket World Cup	2015 Cricket World Cup	Australia	183 (45 overs) – 186/3 (33.1 overs)	New Zealand	Champions	14 (in 2 countries)	Melbourne Cricket Ground	
ICC Men's Cricket World Cup	2022 Men's T20 World Cup	England	137/8 (20 overs) – 138/5 (19 overs)	Pakistan	Super 12	7 ( in 7 cities)	Melbourne Cricket Ground	
Women's senior competitions
ICC Women's Cricket World Cup	1988 Women's Cricket World Cup	Australia	127/7 (60 overs) – 129/2 (44.5 overs)	England	Champions	7 (in 4 cities)	Melbourne Cricket Ground	
ICC Women's Cricket World Cup	2009 Women's Cricket World Cup	England	166 (47.2 overs) – 167/6 (46.1 overs)	New Zealand	Super sixes	7 (in 6 cities)	North Sydney Oval	
ICC Women's T20 World Cup	2020 ICC Women's World Twenty20	Australia	184/4 (20 overs) – 99 (19.1 overs)	India	Champions	6 (in 4 cities)	Melbourne Cricket Ground	

== Performance in international competitions ==
A red box around the year indicates tournaments played within Australia

Key
Champions
Runners-up
Semi-finals

=== Men's team ===
==== ICC World Test Championship ====
ICC World Test Championship record
Year	League stage										Final host	Final	Final position
Year	Pos	Matches					Ded	PC	Pts	PCT	Final host	Final	Final position
Year	Pos	P	W	L	D	T	Ded	PC	Pts	PCT	Final host	Final	Final position
2019–21	3/9	14	8	4	2	0	4	480	332	69.2	Rose Bowl, England	DNQ	3rd
2021–23	1/9	19	11	3	5	0	0	228	152	66.7	The Oval, England	Beat India by 209 runs	Champions
2023–25	2/9	17	11	4	2	0	10	228	130	63.7	Lord's, England	Q	In Progress

==== ICC Cricket World Cup ====
World Cup record
Year	Round	Position	GP	W	L	T	NR
(England) 1975	Runners-up	2/8	5	3	2	0	0
(England) 1979	Group stage	6/8	3	1	2	0	0
(England) 1983	Group stage	6/8	6	2	4	0	0
(India) (Pakistan) 1987	Champions	1/8	8	7	1	0	0
(Australia) (New Zealand) 1992	Round-Robin stage	5/9	8	4	4	0	0
(India) (Pakistan) (Sri Lanka) 1996	Runners-up	2/12	8	5	3	0	0
(England) 1999	Champions	1/12	10	7	2	1	0
(South Africa) 2003	Champions	1/14	11	11	0	0	0
(Cricket West Indies) 2007	Champions	1/16	11	11	0	0	0
(India) (Sri Lanka) (Bangladesh) 2011	Quarter-finals	6/14	7	4	2	0	1
(Australia) (New Zealand) 2015	Champions	1/14	9	7	1	0	1
(England) (Wales) 2019	Semi-finals	4/10	10	7	3	0	0
(India) 2023	Champions	1/10	11	9	2	0	0
Total	6 titles	13/13	106	78	25	1	2

==== ICC T20 World Cup ====
T20 World Cup record
Year	Round	Position	GP	W	L	T	NR
(South Africa) 2007	Semi-finals	3/12	6	3	3	0	0
(England) 2009	Group Stage	11/12	2	0	2	0	0
(Cricket West Indies) 2010	Runners-up	2/12	7	6	1	0	0
(Sri Lanka) 2012	Semi-finals	3/12	6	4	2	0	0
(Bangladesh) 2014	Super 10	8/16	4	1	3	0	0
(India) 2016	Super 10	6/16	4	2	2	0	0
(United Arab Emirates) (Oman) 2021	Champions	1/16	7	6	1	0	0
(Australia) 2022	Super 12	5/16	5	3	1	0	1
(Cricket West Indies) (United States) 2024	Super 8	6/20	7	5	2	0	0
Total	1 title	9/9	48	30	17	0	1

==== ICC Champions Trophy ====
Champions Trophy record
Year	Round	Position	GP	W	L	T	NR
(Bangladesh) 1998	Quarter-finals	8/9	1	0	1	0	0
(Kenya) 2000	Quarter-finals	5/11	1	0	1	0	0
(Sri Lanka) 2002	Semi-finals	4/12	3	2	1	0	0
(England) 2004	Semi-finals	3/12	3	2	1	0	0
(India) 2006	Champions	1/10	5	4	1	0	0
(South Africa) 2009	Champions	1/8	5	4	0	0	1
(England) (Wales) 2013	Group stage	7/8	3	0	2	0	1
(England) (Wales) 2017	Group stage	7/8	3	0	1	0	2
(Pakistan) (United Arab Emirates) 2025	Qualified						
Total	2 Titles	8/8	24	12	8	0	4

==== Commonwealth Games ====
Commonwealth Games record
Year	Round	Position	GP	W	L	T	NR
(Malaysia) 1998	Runners-up	2/16	5	4	1	0	0
Total	0 Titles	1/1	5	4	1	0	0

=== Women's team ===
==== ICC Women's Cricket World Cup ====
Australia at the Women's Cricket World Cup
Year	Finish	Rank	Mat	Won	Lost	Tied	NR
(England) 1973	Runners-up	2/7	6	4	1	0	1
(India) 1978	Champions	1/4	3	3	0	0	0
(New Zealand) 1982	Champions	1/5	13	12	0	1	0
(Australia) 1988	Champions	1/5	9	8	1	0	0
(England) 1993	Group stage	3/8	7	5	2	0	0
(India) 1997	Champions	1/11	7	7	0	0	0
(New Zealand) 2000	Runners-up	2/8	9	8	1	0	0
(South Africa) 2005	Champions	1/8	8	7	0	0	1
(Australia) 2009	Super sixes	4/8	7	4	3	0	0
(India) 2013	Champions	1/8	7	6	1	0	0
(England) 2017	Semi-finalists	3/8	8	6	2	0	0
(New Zealand) 2022	Champions	1/8	9	9	0	0	0
Total	12 appearances, 7 titles		93	79	11	1	2

==== ICC Women's T20 World Cup ====
Australia at the Women's T20 World Cup
Year	Finish	Rank	Mat	Won	Lost	Tied	NR
(England) 2009	Semi-finalists	3/8	4	2	2	0	0
(Cricket West Indies) 2010	Champions	1/8	5	5	0	0	0
(Sri Lanka) 2012	Champions	1/8	5	4	1	0	0
(Bangladesh) 2014	Champions	1/10	6	5	1	0	0
(India) 2016	Runners-up	2/10	6	4	2	0	0
(Cricket West Indies) 2018	Champions	1/10	6	5	1	0	0
(Australia) 2020	Champions	1/10	6	5	1	0	0
(South Africa) 2023	Champions	1/10	6	6	0	0	0
(United Arab Emirates) 2024	Semi-finalists	3/10	5	4	1	0	0
Total	9 appearances, 6 titles		49	39	9	0	0

==== Commonwealth Games ====
Commonwealth Games record
Year	Round	Position	GP	W	L	T	NR
(England) 2022	Gold medal	1/8	5	5	0	0	0
Total	1 Title	-	5	5	0	0	0

=== Men's U-19 team ===
==== U-19 World Cup ====
Australia's U19 World Cup record
Year	Result	Pos	№	Pld	W	L	T	NR
(Australia) 1988	Champions	1st	8	9	8	1	0	0
(South Africa) 1998	Second round	4th	16	6	5	1	0	0
(Sri Lanka) 2000	Semi-finals	4th	16	7	4	3	0	0
(New Zealand) 2002	Champions	1st	16	8	8	0	0	0
(Bangladesh) 2004	First round	10th	16	8	6	2	0	0
(Sri Lanka) 2006	Semi-finals	3rd	16	5	4	1	0	0
(Malaysia) 2008	Second round	6th	16	6	2	2	0	2
(New Zealand) 2010	Champions	1st	16	6	5	1	0	0
(Australia) 2012	Runner-up	2nd	16	6	5	1	0	0
(United Arab Emirates) 2014	Semi-finals	4th	16	6	3	3	0	0
(Bangladesh) 2016	Withdrew							
(New Zealand) 2018	Runner-up	2nd	16	6	4	2	0	0
(South Africa) 2020	Quarter finals	6th	16	6	3	2	0	1
(Cricket West Indies) 2022	Semi-finals	3rd	16	6	4	2	0	0
(South Africa) 2024	Champions	1st	16	8	7	0	0	1

=== Women's U-19 team ===
==== Under-19 Women's World Cup ====
Australia U19's Twenty20 World Cup Record
Year	Result	Pos	№	Pld	W	L	T	NR
(South Africa) 2023	Semi-finals	–	16	6	4	2	0	0
(Malaysia) (Thailand) 2025	To be determined							
(Bangladesh) (Nepal) 2027	To be determined							
Total				6	4	2	0	0

== In Australian culture ==
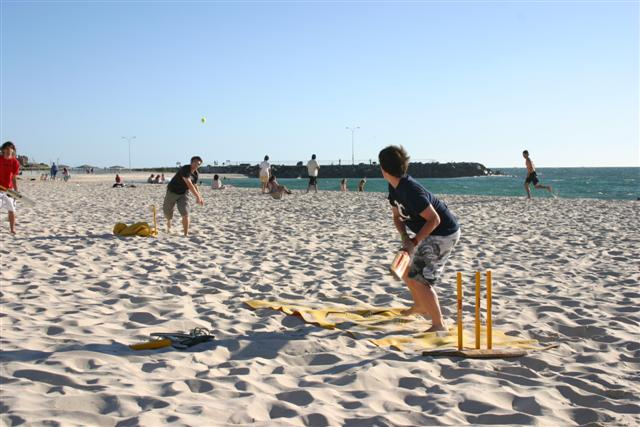
Beach cricket being played at Cottesloe Beach in Perth

In 2007, The Age reported that a survey by Sweeney Sports had found that 59% of the Australian public have an interest in cricket, second to none. Cricket is also a mass participation sport in Australia: a census conducted on behalf of Cricket Australia found that in the 2003–04 season there were 471,329 participants in Australian cricket programs and competitions, including 47,780 female participants.

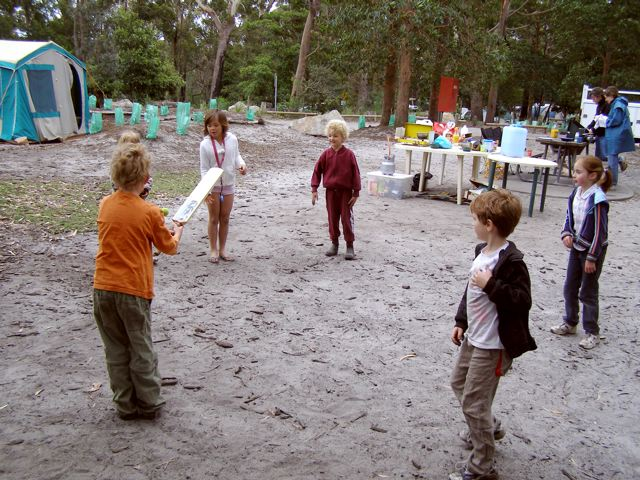
A game of French cricket in progress in Jervis Bay, Australia

In 2015–16, a record 1,300,000 Australians played formal, organised cricket during the year, an increase of nine percent over the previous year, making cricket Australia's biggest participant sport.

The position of Australian Test cricket captain is regarded as one of the most important roles in Australian sport. It is often said that in Australia the office of Test captain is second in stature behind the office of Prime Minister. Reflecting this community perception, three Australian cricket captains have been named as Australian of the Year by the National Australia Day Council; Allan Border in 1989, Mark Taylor in 1999 and Steve Waugh in 2004. In addition, Steve Waugh has been nominated as an Australian Living Treasure by the National Trust of Australia, as was Don Bradman prior to his death in 2001.

Cricket plays an important role in Australia's national identity, in particular its relationship towards the United Kingdom. The national team has been said to represent "de facto Australian foreign policy" particularly with respect to relations with Asian subcontinent nations.

With both predominant winter sports, Australian rules football and rugby league, having largely regionally divided followings, cricket is the only one of the nation's three most popular sports to maintain a truly national following.

=== Audience ===
Official audience data shows that 93.6% of Australians watched at least some cricket on TV in 2010–11 calendar year.

Australia's victory over New Zealand in the 2015 Cricket World Cup Final was, at the time, the most-watched sports match ever in Australia, peaking at 4.218 million viewers nationally. The second innings of the match, which saw Australia winning the match with seven wickets to spare, averaged 2.404 million in the five capital cities and 3.285 million nationally. A further 522,000 watched Australia's innings on pay-TV channel Fox Sports 3, while 492,000 watched the first session.

3.196 million viewers peaked in for the 2015 Cricket World Cup semi-final between Australia and India, which was broadcast on the Nine Network.

The first ever Day/Night test match between Australia and New Zealand attracted nearly 3.1 million viewers across the country during the first two days of the match at Adelaide Oval. The third and eventually the final day of the match, attracted a peak national audience of 3.19 million.

An audience of 2.306 million viewers watched the Australia v England Twenty20 match in 2007. It still remains the most watched Twenty20 match in Australia on TV.

In 2013, Ten paid $100 million for BBL rights over five years, marking the channel's first foray into elite cricket coverage. Network Ten had previously covered the Big Bash League. In 2018 it was announced that the Seven Network and Foxtel had paid a combined $1.2 billion over 6 years for broadcast rights of all cricket competitions in Australia.

BBL coverage has become a regular feature of Australian summers and attracted an average audience of more than 492,000 viewers nationally in 2023-24 season, including a peak audience of 952,000 viewers for the final.

== Attendances ==
In the 2024-25 league season, six cricket clubs from Australia recorded an average home league attendance of at least 20,000:

#	Team	Average
1	Perth Scorchers	38,507
2	Adelaide Strikers	28,593
3	Brisbane Heat	26,593
4	Sydney Sixers	26,515
5	Melbourne Stars	24,401
6	Melbourne Renegades	21,528

== See also ==
- Cricket in New South Wales
- Cricket in Norfolk Island
- Cricket in Queensland
- Cricket in Victoria
- Cricket in Western Australia
