= 2006 ICC Champions Trophy final =

2006 ICC Champions Trophy Final
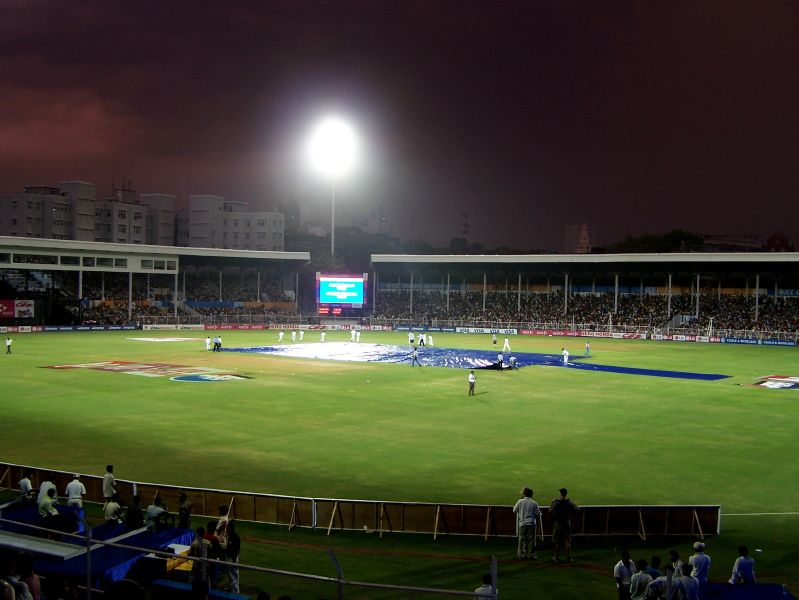
- The final was disrupted by rain under lights at the Brabourne Stadium
- Event: 2006 ICC Champions Trophy
West Indies	Australia
138	116/2
30.4	28.1
- Australia won by 8 wickets (D/L method)
- Date: 5 November 2006
- Venue: Brabourne Stadium, Mumbai
- Player of the match: Shane Watson (Aus)
- Umpires: Aleem Dar (Pak) and Rudi Koertzen (SA)
- Attendance: 26,000

The final of the 2006 ICC Champions Trophy was played on 5 November 2006 between the West Indies and Australia at the Brabourne Stadium, Mumbai. Australia qualified into the final by defeating New Zealand in the first semi-final at the Punjab Cricket Association Stadium, Mohali on 1 November 2006. The West Indies made their way into the final after defeating South Africa in the second semi-final played at Sawai Mansingh Stadium, Jaipur on 2 November 2006. The match was interrupted by rain during the Australian innings. Australia won the final by 8 wickets applying Duckworth–Lewis method (D/L method), winning the Champions Trophy for the first time. Shane Watson earned the man of the match award for his performance in the match. Chris Gayle was named the man of the series for scoring 474 runs in the tournament.

== Road to the final ==
=== Semifinals ===
The first semi final was played between Australia and New Zealand on 1 November 2006 at the Punjab Cricket Association Stadium, Mohali. Australia batted first and scored 240 runs for 9 wickets in 50 overs. Ricky Ponting and Andrew Symonds scored 58 runs each. Kyle Mills took four wickets for 38 runs in 10 overs. In the reply, New Zealand were all out for 206 runs in 46 overs with Daniel Vettori scoring 79 runs. Glenn McGrath, who took three wickets conceding 22 runs in 10 overs, was given man of the match award.

West Indies played South Africa in the second semi-final on 2 November 2006 at the Sawai Mansingh Stadium, Jaipur, and defeated them by 6 wickets. South Africa scored 258 runs for eight wickets in 50 overs with Herschelle Gibbs scoring 77 runs. Dwayne Bravo took two wickets for 44 runs in seven overs. West Indies had lost four wickets before reaching the target in 44 overs. Their highest scorer Chris Gayle—133 runs not out from 135 balls—shared an opening partnership of 154 runs with Shivnarine Chanderpaul, who scored 57. South African bowler Robin Peterson conceded 36 runs in seven overs for taking one wicket. Gayle's performance earned him the man of the match award.

== Match details ==
=== Match officials ===
- On-field umpires: Aleem Dar (Pak) and Rudi Koertzen (SA)
- Third umpire: Billy Bowden (NZ)
- Reserve umpire: Mark Benson (Eng)
- Match referee: Ranjan Madugalle (SL)
- Toss: West Indies won the toss and elected to bat.

=== Summary ===
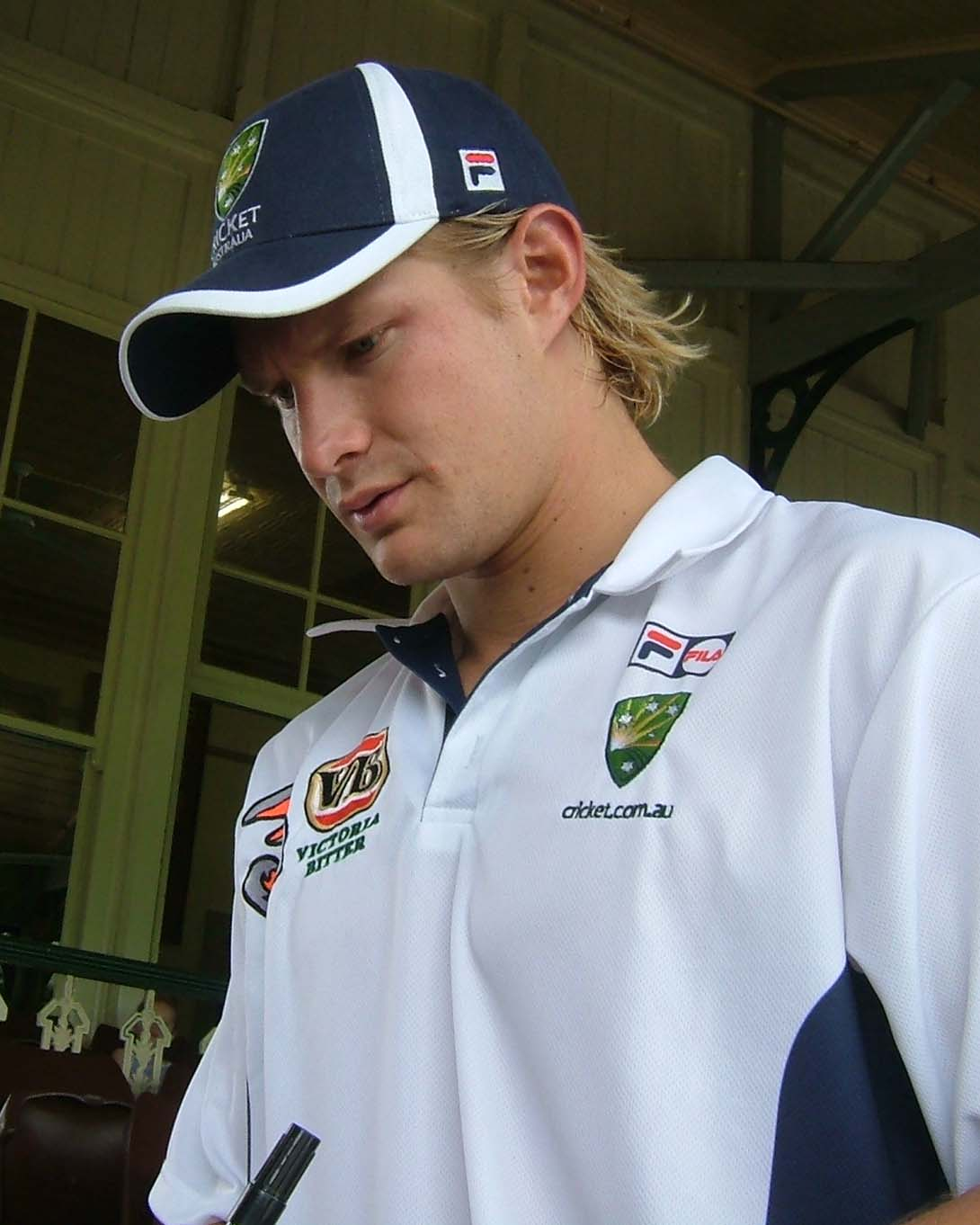
Shane Watson scored 57 runs not out and took two wickets in the match.

The final of the 2006 ICC Champions Trophy was played between Australia and West Indies in Brabourne Stadium, Mumbai on 5 November 2006. West Indies batted first after winning the toss. Chanderpaul and Gayle opened the innings, shared a partnership of 49 runs in 5.1 overs. Chanderpaul scored 27 runs from 18 balls. Brett Lee, who was struck for a six and four fours by Chanderpaul, conceded 36 runs in his opening spell three overs. Gayle scored 37 runs from 27 balls hitting McGrath for 14 runs in three consecutive deliveries including two sixes. McGrath conceded 22 runs in his first two overs, but his next five overs cost just two runs for two wickets. Despite their 80 runs in the first 10 overs, West Indies were all out for 138 runs in 30.4 overs. Their last eight batsmen added just 58 runs to the total; and last five players scored 25 runs in eight overs. Australian left-arm fast bowler Nathan Bracken took three wickets for 22 runs in six overs whereas Shane Watson took two wickets for 11 runs in three overs. Australia started their batting with the early losses of Adam Gilchrist and captain Ricky Ponting, and were restricted to 13 runs for two wickets in four overs. Before the scheduled dinner break, Watson and Damien Martyn had taken the total to 45 runs in 10 overs. The match was then delayed for two hours due to rain, and the revised target of 116 runs was set in 35 overs applying the Duckworth–Lewis method (D/L method). Australia reached the target in 28.5 overs with Watson and Martyn scoring 57 and 47 runs (both not out) respectively. West Indian fast bowler Ian Bradshaw took one wicket for 21 runs in six overs. Watson was given the man of the match award for his all-round performance. Gayle was named the man of the tournament for scoring 474 runs in eight games including three centuries. West Indies, the winner of the 2004 ICC Champions Trophy, were not able to defend the title. Australia won the ICC Champions Trophy for the first time.

5 November
14:30 (D/N)
Scorecard

West Indies; 138 (30.4 overs)	v	Australia; 116/2 (28.1 overs)
Chris Gayle 37 (27); Nathan Bracken 3/22 (6 overs)		Shane Watson 57* (88); Ian Bradshaw 1/21 (6 overs)

Australia won by 8 wickets (D/L method)
Brabourne Stadium, Mumbai
Umpires: Aleem Dar (Pak) and Rudi Koertzen (SA)
Player of the match: Shane Watson (Aus)

- West Indies won the toss and elected to bat
- Australia were set a revised target of 116 runs from 35 overs.

== Scorecard ==
West Indies batting
Player	Status	Runs	Balls	4s	6s	Strike rate
Shivnarine Chanderpaul	b Bracken	27	18	4	1	150.00
Chris Gayle	b Bracken	37	27	6	2	137.02
Ramnaresh Sarwan	c Hogg b Bracken	7	9	1	0	77.77
Dwayne Bravo	lbw b Hogg	21	47	3	0	44.68
Brian Lara *	c †Gilchrist b McGrath	2	18	0	0	11.11
Runako Morton	c †Gilchrist b McGrath	2	9	0	0	22.22
Marlon Samuels	c Ponting b Watson	7	12	1	0	58.33
Carlton Baugh †	lbw b Watson	9	13	1	0	69.23
Ian Bradshaw	b Lee	7	15	1	0	46.66
Jerome Taylor	not out	5	13	0	0	38.46
Corey Collymore	run out (Symonds)	0	5	0	0	0.00
Extras	(lb 5, nb 2, w 7)	14				
Total	(all out; 30.4 overs)	138		17	3	

Fall of wickets: 1/49 (Chanderpaul, 5.1 ov), 2/65 (Sarwan, 7.3 ov), 3/80 (Gayle, 9.4 ov), 4/88 (Lara, 14.5 ov), 5/94 (Morton, 18.2 ov), 6/113 (Samuels, 22.4 ov), 7/125 (Baugh, 24.6 ov), 8/125 (Bravo, 25.1 ov), 9/136 (Bradshaw, 28.6 ov), 10/138 (Collymore, 30.4 ov)

Australia bowling
Bowler	Overs	Maidens	Runs	Wickets	Econ	Wides	NBs
Brett Lee	7.4	0	49	1	6.39	0	2
Nathan Bracken	6	0	22	3	3.66	3	0
Glenn McGrath	7	3	24	2	3.42	2	0
Andrew Symonds	3	0	16	0	5.33	0	0
Shane Watson	3	0	11	2	3.66	1	0
Brad Hogg	4	1	11	1	2.75	1	0

Australia batting
Player	Status	Runs	Balls	4s	6s	Strike rate
Adam Gilchrist	c Gayle b Bradshaw	2	9	0	0	22.22
Shane Watson	not out	57	88	4	0	64.77
Ricky Ponting	lbw b Taylor	0	2	0	0	0.00
Damien Martyn	not out	47	71	6	0	66.19
Michael Hussey						
Andrew Symonds						
Michael Clarke						
Brett Lee						
Brad Hogg						
Nathan Bracken						
Glenn McGrath						
Extras	(lb 4, nb 1, w 5)	10				
Total	(2 wickets; 28.1 overs)	116		10	0	

Fall of wickets: 1/12 (Gilchrist, 2.6 ov), 2/13 (Ponting, 3.6 ov)

West Indies bowling
Bowler	Overs	Maidens	Runs	Wickets	Econ	Wides	NBs
Chris Gayle	1	0	5	0	5.00	0	0
Jerome Taylor	7	0	42	1	6.00	1	0
Ian Bradshaw	6	0	21	1	3.50	1	1
Corey Collymore	6	1	19	0	3.16	1	0
Marlon Samuels	5	0	9	0	1.80	0	0
Ramnaresh Sarwan	3.1	0	16	0	5.05	2	0

Key

- * – Captain
- † – Wicket-keeper
- c Fielder – the batsman was dismissed by a catch by the named fielder
- b Bowler – the bowler who gains credit for the dismissal
- lbw – the batsman was dismissed leg before wicket
- Total runs are in the format: score/wickets

== Controversy ==
Australia were criticised for pushing Board of Control for Cricket in India (BCCI) President and Minister in the Government of India, Sharad Pawar off the podium once he presented the trophy to Australian captain Ponting. Television replays showed Martyn placing his hand on the minister's shoulder and asking him to move aside, Ponting showing Pawar his forefinger as asking to give him the trophy. Indian media described Australia as "rude and arrogant". The Times of India reported that "Australia showed they aren't exactly polite off it too" while Indian Express headlined that "this is how champions behave when they get the trophy." Former Indian captain Sachin Tendulkar called the incident as "unpleasant" and said that "such incidents should be avoided." Indian chief selector Dilip Vengsarkar reacted that it was a "behavior from uneducated people" and called it "appalling." Pawar, however, recalled the incident "a small thing, stupid thing," and said that he did not "want to react."
