= Australia national cricket team =

Australia
- Association: Cricket Australia

Personnel
- Test captain: Pat Cummins
- One Day captain: Pat Cummins
- T20I captain: Mitchell Marsh
- Coach: Andrew McDonald

History
- Test status acquired: 1877; 149 years ago

International Cricket Council
- ICC status: Full Member (1909; 117 years ago)
- ICC region: East Asia-Pacific
ICC Rankings	Current	Best-ever
Test	2nd	1st (1 January 1952)
ODI	3rd	1st (1 January 1990)
T20I	3rd	1st (1 May 2020)

Tests
- First Test: v. England at the Melbourne Cricket Ground, Melbourne; 15–19 March 1877
- Last Test: v. South Africa at Newlands Cricket Ground, Cape Town; 27–31 October 2026
Tests	Played	Won/Lost
Total	887	428/237 (219 draws, 2 ties)
This year	6	3/3 (0 draws)
- World Test Championship appearances: 3 (first in 2019–2021)
- Best result: Champions (2023)

One Day Internationals
- First ODI: v. England at the Melbourne Cricket Ground, Melbourne; 5 January 1971
- Last ODI: v. England at Bellerive Oval, Hobart; 18 November 2026
ODIs	Played	Won/Lost
Total	1,034	624/366 (9 ties, 35 no results)
This year	15	7/8 (0 ties, 0 no results)
- World Cup appearances: 13 (first in 1975)
- Best result: Champions (1987, 1999, 2003, 2007, 2015, 2023)

T20 Internationals
- First T20I: v. New Zealand at Eden Park, Auckland; 17 February 2005
- Last T20I: v. England at Melbourne Cricket Ground, Melbourne; 21 November 2026
T20Is	Played	Won/Lost
Total	230	128/92 (3 ties, 7 no results)
This year	11	6/5 (0 ties, 0 no results)
- T20 World Cup appearances: 8 (first in 2007)
- Best result: Champions (2021)
Test kit
ODI kit
T20I kit
- As of 21 November 2026

The Australia men's national cricket team represents Australia in international cricket. Along with England, it is the joint oldest team in Test cricket history, playing and winning the first ever Test match in 1877; the team also plays One-Day International and Twenty20 International cricket, participating in both the first ODI, against England in the 1970–71 season and the first T20I, against New Zealand in the 2004–05 season, winning both games. The team draws its players from teams playing in the Australian domestic competitions – the Sheffield Shield, the Australian domestic limited-overs cricket tournament and the Big Bash League. Australia are the current ICC Cricket World Cup champions. They are generally regarded as the most successful national team in the history of cricket.

The national team has played 887 Test matches, winning 428, losing 238, 219 drawn and with 2 tied. As of October 2025, Australia is first in the ICC Test Rankings. Australia is the most successful team in Test cricket history, in terms of overall wins, win–loss ratio, and wins percentage. Australia have won the ICC World Test Championship once, defeating India in the final of the 2021–2023 World Test Championship. Test rivalries centre on The Ashes (with England), the Border–Gavaskar Trophy (with India), the Frank Worrell Trophy (with the West Indies), the Trans-Tasman Trophy (with New Zealand), and matches against South Africa.

The team has played 1,034 ODI matches, winning 624, losing 366, tying 9 and with 35 ending in a no-result. As of February 2026, Australia is ranked third in the ICC Men's ODI Team Rankings. Australia is one of the most successful teams in ODI cricket history, winning more than 60 per cent of their matches, with a record eight World Cup final appearances (1975, 1987, 1996, 1999, 2003, 2007, 2015, and 2023) and have won the World Cup a record six times: 1987, 1999, 2003, 2007, 2015, and 2023. Australia is the only team to appear in four consecutive World Cup finals (1996, 1999, 2003, and 2007), surpassing the old record of three consecutive World Cup appearances by the West Indies (1975, 1979, and 1983) and the only team to win three consecutive World Cups (1999, 2003, and 2007). The team was undefeated in 34 consecutive World Cup matches until the 2011 Cricket World Cup where Pakistan beat them by four wickets in the Group stage. Australia is also the second team to win a World Cup (2015) on home soil, after India (2011). Australia have also won the ICC Champions Trophy twice (2006 and 2009) making them the only team to be back-to-back winners in the Champions Trophy tournaments.

Australia has played 230 Twenty20 International matches, winning 128, losing 92, tying 3, and with 7 ending in a no-result. As of November 2025, Australia is ranked second in the ICC Men's T20I Team Rankings. Australia have won the ICC Men's T20 World Cup once, defeating New Zealand in the 2021 Final.

On 12 January 2019, Australia won an ODI against India at the Sydney Cricket Ground by 34 runs, to record their 1,000th win in international cricket.

== History ==
=== Early history ===
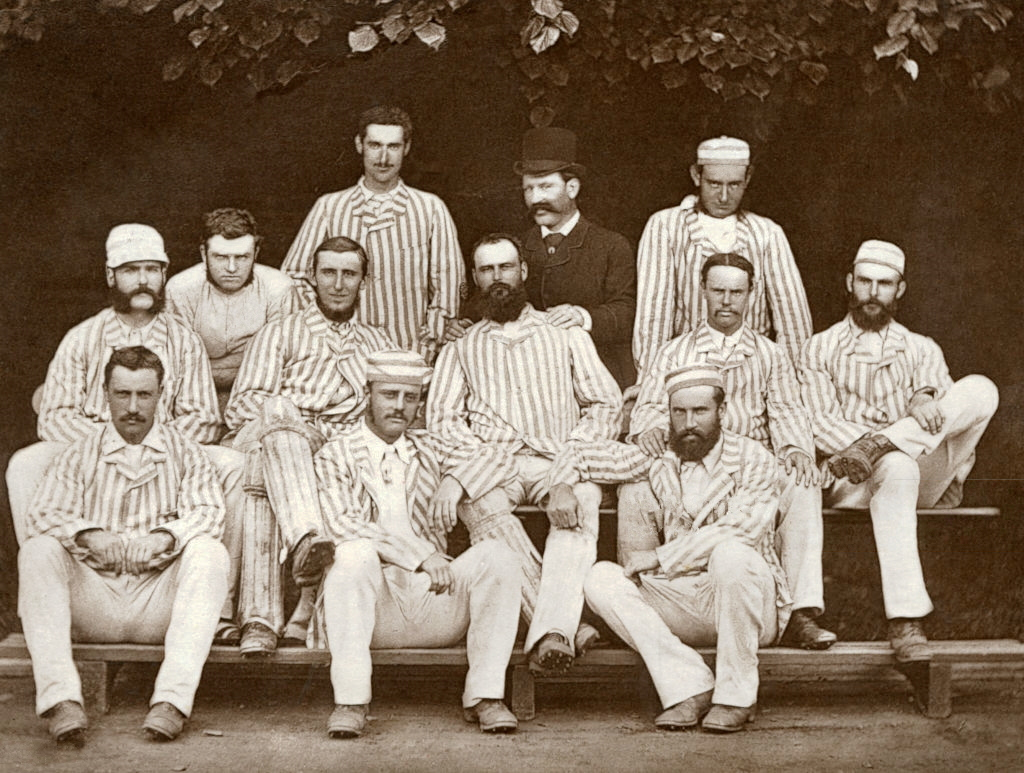
The Australian team that toured England in 1878

The Australian cricket team participated in the first Test match at the MCG in 1877. They defeated England by 45 runs, with Charles Bannerman making the first Test century with a score of 165. Test cricket, which only occurred between Australia and England at the time, was limited by the long distance between the two countries, which took several months by sea. Despite Australia's much smaller population, the team was very competitive in early games, producing stars such as Jack Blackham, Billy Murdoch, Fred "The Demon" Spofforth, George Bonnor, Percy McDonnell, George Giffen, and Charles "The Terror" Turner. Most cricketers at the time were either from New South Wales or Victoria, with the notable exception of George Giffen, the star South Australian all-rounder.

One of the highlights of Australia's early history was the 1882 Test match against England, which took place at The Oval. In this match, Fred Spofforth took 7/44 in the game's fourth innings, saving the match by preventing England from making their 85-run target.

After this match, The Sporting Times, a major newspaper in London at the time, printed a mock obituary in which the death of English cricket was proclaimed and the announcement made that "the body was cremated and the ashes taken to Australia." This was the start of the famous Ashes series, in which Australia and England play a series of Test matches to decide the holder of the Ashes. To this day, the contest is one of the fiercest rivalries in sport.

=== Golden age ===
The 'Golden Age' of Australian Test cricket occurred around the end of the 19th century, concluding at the beginning of the 20th century, with the team under the captaincy of Joe Darling, Monty Noble and Clem Hill, winning eight of ten tours. It is considered to have lasted from the 1897–98 English tour of Australia and the 1910–11 South African tour of Australia. Outstanding batsmen such as Joe Darling, Clem Hill, and Reggie Duff, all helped Australia to become the dominant cricketing nation for most of this period.

Victor Trumper became one of Australia's first sporting heroes, who was widely considered Australia's greatest batsman before Bradman became one of the most popular players. He played a record (at the time) of a number of Tests at 49, and scored 3163 runs at a high for the time average of 39.04. He died in 1915 at the age of 37 from kidney disease, causing national mourning. The Wisden Cricketers' Almanack, in its obituary for him, called him Australia's greatest batsman: "Of all the great Australian batsmen Victor Trumper was by general consent the best and most brilliant." The years leading up to the start of World War were marred by conflict between the players, led by Clem Hill, Victor Trumper and Frank Laver, and the Australian Board of Control for International Cricket, led by Peter McAlister, who was attempting to gain more control of tours from the players.

This led to six leading players (the so-called "Big Six") walking out on the 1912 Triangular Tournament in England, with Australia fielding what was generally considered a second-rate team. This was the last series before the war, and no more cricket was played by Australia for eight years. Fast bowler Tibby Cotter, who had caused outrage with his bowling during the 1905 tour of England, after first striking W.G. Grace with the ball, before dismissing him the following delivery, was killed during the Battle of Beersheba.

=== Inter-war period ===
Test cricket resumed in the 1920/21 season in Australia with a touring English team captained by Johnny Douglas losing all five Tests to Australia, captained by the "Big Ship" Warwick Armstrong. Several players from before the war, including Warwick Armstrong, Charlie Macartney, Charles Kelleway, Warren Bardsley and the wicket-keeper Sammy Carter, were instrumental in the team's success, as well as new players Herbie Collins, Jack Ryder, Bert Oldfield, the spinner Arthur Mailey and the so-called "twin destroyers" Jack Gregory and Ted McDonald. The team continued its success on the 1921 tour of England, winning three out of the five Tests in Warwick Armstrong's last series. The team was, on the whole, inconsistent in the latter half of the 1920s, losing its first home Ashes series since the 1911–12 season in 1928–29.

=== Bradman era ===
The 1930 tour of England heralded a new age of success for the Australian team. The team, led by Bill Woodfull – the "Great Un-bowlable" – featured legends of the game including Bill Ponsford, Stan McCabe, Clarrie Grimmett and the young pair of Archie Jackson and Don Bradman. Bradman was the outstanding batsman of the series, scoring a record 974 runs, including one century, two double centuries and one triple century, a massive score of 334 at Leeds which including 309 runs in a day. Jackson died of tuberculosis at the age of 23 three years later, after playing eight Tests. The team was widely considered unstoppable, winning nine of its next ten Tests.

The 1932–33 England tour of Australia is considered one of the most infamous episodes of cricket, due to the England team's use of bodyline, where captain Douglas Jardine instructed his bowlers Bill Voce and Harold Larwood to bowl fast, short-pitched deliveries aimed at the bodies of the Australian batsmen. The tactic, although effective, was widely considered by Australian crowds as vicious and unsporting. Injuries to Bill Woodfull, who was struck over the heart, and Bert Oldfield, who received a fractured skull (although from a non-bodyline ball), exacerbated the situation, almost causing a full-scale riot from the 50 000 fans at the Adelaide Oval for the third Test. The conflict almost escalated into a diplomatic incident between the two countries, as leading Australian political figures, including the Governor of South Australia, Alexander Hore-Ruthven, protested to their English counterparts. The series ended in a 4–1 win for England but the bodyline tactics used were banned the year after.

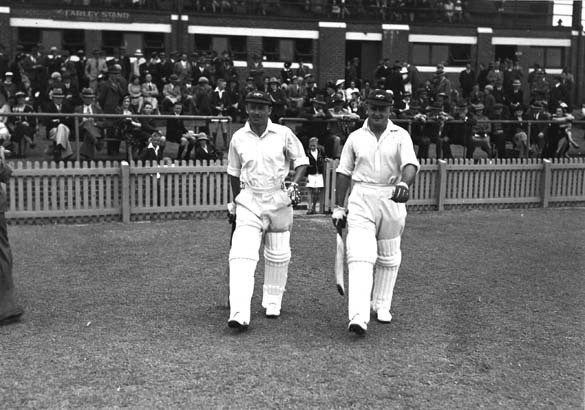
Bradman (left, with his vice-captain Stan McCabe) walks out to bat at Perth, during a preliminary match to the 1938 tour of England. Bradman scored 102.

The Australian team put the result of this series behind them, winning their next tour of England in 1934. The team was led by Bill Woodfull on his final tour and was notably dominated by Ponsford and Bradman, who twice put on partnerships of over 380 runs, with Bradman once again scoring a triple century at Leeds. The bowling was dominated by the spin pair of Bill O'Reilly and Clarrie Grimmett, who took 53 wickets between them, with O'Reilly twice taking seven-wicket hauls.

Sir Donald Bradman is widely considered the greatest player of all time. He dominated the sport from 1930 until his retirement in 1948, setting new records for the highest score in a Test innings (334 vs England at Headingley in 1930), the most runs (6996), the most centuries (29), the most double centuries and the highest Test and first-class batting averages. His record for the highest Test batting average – 99.94 – has never been beaten. It is almost 40 runs per innings above the next highest average. He would have finished with an average of over 100 runs per innings if he had not been dismissed for a duck in his last Test. He was knighted in 1949 for services to cricket. He is generally considered one of Australia's all-time greatest sporting heroes, if not the greatest.

Test cricket was again interrupted by war, with the last Test series in 1938 made notable by Len Hutton scoring a world record 364 for England, and with Chuck Fleetwood-Smith conceding 298 runs in England's world record total of 7/903. Ross Gregory, a notable young batsman who played two Tests before the war, was killed in the war.

=== Post-war era ===
The team continued its success after the end of the Second World War with the first Test (also Australia's first against New Zealand) being played in the 1945–46 season against New Zealand. Australia was by far the most successful team of the 1940s, being undefeated throughout the decade, winning two Ashes series against England and its first Test series against India. The team capitalised on its ageing stars Bradman, Sid Barnes, Bill Brown and Lindsay Hassett while new talent, including Ian Johnson, Don Tallon, Arthur Morris, Neil Harvey, Bill Johnston and the fast bowling pair of Ray Lindwall and Keith Miller, who all made their debut in the latter half of the 1940s, and were to form the basis of the team for a good part of the next decade. The team that Don Bradman led to England in 1948 gained the moniker The Invincibles, after going through the tour without losing a single game. Of 31 first-class games played during the tour, they won 23 and drew 8, including winning the five-match Test series 4–0 with one draw. The tour was particularly notable for the fourth Test of the series, in which Australia won by seven wickets chasing a target of 404, setting a new record for the highest run chase in Test cricket, with Arthur Morris and Bradman both scoring centuries, as well as for the final Test in the series, Bradman's last, where he finished with a duck in his last innings after needing only four runs to secure a career average of 100.

Australia was less successful in the 1950s, losing three consecutive Ashes series to England, including a horrendous 1956 Tour of England, where the 'spin twins' Laker and Lock destroyed Australia, taking 61 wickets between them, including Laker taking 19 wickets in the game (a first-class record) at Headingley, a game dubbed Laker's Match.

However, the team rebounded to win five consecutive series in the latter half of the 1950s, first under the leadership of Ian Johnson, then Ian Craig and Richie Benaud. The series against the West Indies in the 1960–61 season was notable for the Tied Test in the first game at the Gabba, which was the first in Test cricket. Australia ended up winning the series 2–1 after a hard-fought series that was praised for its excellent standards and sense of fair play. Stand-out players in that series as well as through the early part of the 1960s were Richie Benaud, who took a then-record number of wickets as a leg-spinner and who also captained Australia in 28 Tests, including 24 without defeat;Alan Davidson, who was a notable fast-bowler and also became the first player to take 10 wickets and make 100 runs in the same game in the first Test; Bob Simpson, who also later captained Australia for two different periods of time; Colin McDonald, the first-choice opening batsman for most of the 1950s and early '60s; Norm O'Neill, who made 181 in the Tied Test;Neil Harvey, towards the end of his long career; and Wally Grout, an excellent wicket-keeper who died at the age of 41.

=== World Series Cricket and Restructuring ===
The Centenary Test was played in March 1977 at the MCG to celebrate 100 years since the first Test was played. Australia won the match by 45 runs, an identical result to the first Test match.

In May 1977, Kerry Packer announced he was organising a breakaway competition – World Series Cricket (WSC) – after the Australian Cricket Board (ACB) refused to accept Channel Nine's bid to gain exclusive television rights to Australia's Test matches in 1976. Packer secretly signed leading international cricketers to his competition, including 28 Australians. Almost all of the Australian Test team at the time were signed to WSC – notable exceptions including Gary Cosier, Geoff Dymock, Kim Hughes and Craig Serjeant – and the Australian selectors were forced to pick what was generally considered a third-rate team from players in the Sheffield Shield. Former player Bob Simpson, who had retired 10 years previously after a conflict with the board, was recalled at the age of 41 to captain Australia against India. Jeff Thomson was named deputy in a team that included seven debutants. Australia managed to win the series 3–2, mainly thanks to the batting of Simpson, who scored 539 runs, including two centuries; and the bowling of Wayne Clark, who took 28 wickets. Australia lost the next series 3–1 against the West Indies, which was fielding a full strength team; and also lost the 1978–79 Ashes series 5–1, the team's worst Ashes result in Australia. Graham Yallop was named as captain for the Ashes, with Kim Hughes taking over for the 1979–80 tour of India. Rodney Hogg took 41 wickets in his debut series, an Australian record. WSC players returned to the team for the 1979–80 season after a settlement between the ACB and Kerry Packer. Greg Chappell was reinstated as captain.

The underarm bowling incident of 1981 occurred when, in an ODI against New Zealand, Greg Chappell instructed his brother Trevor to bowl an underarm delivery to New Zealand batsman Brian McKechnie with New Zealand needing a six to tie off the last ball. The aftermath of the incident soured political relations between Australia and New Zealand, with several leading political and cricketing figures calling it "unsportsmanlike" and "not in the spirit of cricket".

Australia continued its success up until the early 1980s, built around the Chappell brothers, Dennis Lillee, Jeff Thomson and Rod Marsh. The 1980s was a period of relative mediocrity after the turmoil caused by the Rebel Tours of South Africa and the subsequent retirement of several key players. The rebel tours were funded by the South African Cricket Board to compete against its national team, which had been banned—along with many other sports, including Olympic athletes—from competing internationally, due to the South African government's racist apartheid policies. Some of Australia's best players were poached: Graham Yallop, Carl Rackemann, Terry Alderman, Rodney Hogg, Kim Hughes, John Dyson, Greg Shipperd, Steve Rixon and Steve Smith amongst others. These players were handed three-year suspensions by the Australian Cricket Board which greatly weakened the player pool for the national teams, as most were either current representative players or on the verge of gaining honours.

=== Golden era ===
The so-called 'Golden Era' of Australian cricket occurred around the end of the 20th century and the beginning of the 21st century. This was a period in which Australian cricket recovered from the disruption caused by World Series Cricket to create arguably the strongest Test team in history.

Under the captaincy of Allan Border and the new fielding standards put in place by new coach Bob Simpson, the team was restructured and gradually rebuilt their cricketing stocks. Some of the rebel players returned to the national team after serving their suspensions, including Trevor Hohns, Carl Rackemann and Terry Alderman. During these lean years, it was the batsmen Border, David Boon, Dean Jones, the young Steve Waugh and the bowling feats of Alderman, Bruce Reid, Craig McDermott, Merv Hughes and to a lesser extent, Geoff Lawson who kept the Australian team afloat.

With the emergence of players such as Ian Healy, Mark Taylor, Geoff Marsh, Mark Waugh, and Greg Matthews in the late 1980s, Australia was on the way back from the doldrums. They went on to win their first ever world title by getting the better of England in the 1987 Cricket World Cup final. Winning the Ashes in 1989, the Australians got a roll on beating Pakistan, Sri Lanka and then followed it up with another Ashes win on home soil in 1991. The Australians went on to the West Indies and had their chances but ended up losing the series. However, they bounced back and beat the Indians in their next Test series; with the retirement of the champion but defensive Allan Border, a new era of attacking cricket had begun under the leadership of firstly Mark Taylor and then Steve Waugh. Australia ended the 20th century by winning the 1999 Cricket World Cup. They defeated Pakistan in the final.

=== Team of the Century ===
The ACB Team of the Century was a theoretical cricket team selected by the Australian Cricket Board in 2000 as the best team of Australian cricketers in the 20th century. It consisted of:

1. Bill Ponsford
2. Arthur Morris
3. Don Bradman (captain)
4. Greg Chappell
5. Neil Harvey
6. Keith Miller (vice-captain)
7. Ian Healy (wicket-keeper)
8. Ray Lindwall
9. Shane Warne
10. Dennis Lillee
11. Bill O'Reilly
12. Allan Border (12th man)

=== 21st century ===
The 1990s and early 21st century were arguably Australia's most successful periods, unbeaten in all Ashes series played bar the famous 2005 series and achieving a hat-trick of World Cups.

Following the 2006–07 Ashes series which Australia won 5–0, Australia slipped in the rankings after the retirements of key players. In the 2013/14 Ashes series, Australia again defeated England 5–0 and climbed back to third in the ICC International Test rankings. In February/March 2014, Australia beat South Africa, the number one team in the world, 2–1 and overtook them to return to the top of the rankings. In 2015, Australia won the Cricket World Cup, losing just one game for the tournament.

==== 2018 ball-tampering incident ====
On 25 March 2018, during the third Test match against hosts South Africa; players Cameron Bancroft, Steve Smith, David Warner and the leadership group of the team were implicated in a ball tampering scandal. Smith and Bancroft admitted to conspiring to alter the condition of the ball by rubbing it with a piece of adhesive tape containing abrasive granules picked up from the ground (it was later revealed that sandpaper was used). Smith stated that the purpose was to gain an advantage by unlawfully changing the ball's surface in order to generate reverse swing. Bancroft had been filmed tampering with the ball and, after being informed he had been caught, he was seen to transfer a yellow object from a pocket to the inside front of his trousers to hide the evidence. Steve Smith and David Warner were stood down as captain and vice-captain during the third Test while head coach, Darren Lehmann was suspected to have assisted Cameron Bancroft to tamper the ball. In November 2026, Usman Khawaja claimed in his autobiography that Australia also used sandpaper at Port Elizabeth in the second Test of the 2018 series, and that every member of the touring party knew of the plans.

The ICC imposed a one-match ban and 100%-match-fee fine on Smith, while Bancroft was fined 75 percent of his match fee and received 3 demerit points. Smith and Warner were both stripped of their captaincy roles by Cricket Australia and sent home from the tour (along with Bancroft). Tim Paine was appointed as captain for the fourth Test. Cricket Australia then suspended Smith and Warner from playing for 12 months and Bancroft for 9 months. Smith and Bancroft could not be considered for leadership roles for 12 months after the suspension, while Warner is banned from leadership of any Cricket Australia team for life. In the aftermath of these events, Darren Lehmann announced his resignation as head coach at the end of the series, with Justin Langer replacing him. On 8 May 2018, Tim Paine was also named as the ODI captain while Aaron Finch was reinstated as T20I captain hours later, although Finch replaced Paine as the ODI captain after the 5–0 ODI series whitewash in England in June 2018.

==== October 2018–present ====
On 7 October 2018, Australia played their first Test match under new coach Justin Langer and a new leadership group, which included Tim Paine as Australia's 46th Test captain. After a 1–0 loss to Pakistan in a two match Test series against Pakistan in the UAE and a 2–1 defeat against India in a four match Test series, they found success against Sri Lanka, winning the two Test match series 2–0. In 2019, Australia played in the Cricket World Cup, where they finished second in the group stage before being knocked out by England at Edgbaston in the semi-final. Australia later went on to retain the Ashes during the 2019 Ashes series, the first time on English soil since 2001, by winning the fourth Test at Old Trafford.

In 2020–21, Australia hosted India for 3 ODIs, 3 T20Is, and 4 Tests. They won the ODI series 2–1, but lost the T20I series 2–1. Then, the two teams competed for the Border–Gavaskar Trophy which saw one of the greatest overseas Test triumphs by India in the 4th Test to win the series 2–1, with the 3rd Test being drawn. In 2021, Australia named a 15-member squad for the upcoming T20 World Cup with regular limited overs captain Aaron Finch leading the team. In finals, they would face their trans-Tasman rivals New Zealand and win the match to claim their maiden T20 World Cup Trophy.

On 19 November 2021, Tim Paine resigned from the captaincy due to off-the-field misconduct, and was replaced by Pat Cummins, who became Australia's 47th Test captain, with Steve Smith named as his deputy. Under Pat Cummins, Australia retained 2021–22 Ashes at home by winning the series 4–0. Australia then toured Pakistan in March 2022 for the first time since 1998 to play 3 test matches and 3 ODIs and one-off T20. Australia won all the series. Australia failed to advance to knockouts in 2022 T20 World Cup. Australia's white ball captain Finch retired from international cricket. Afterwards, Pat Cummins was made ODI captain.

Under Cummins’ captaincy, Australia had a stellar 2023, winning their maiden ICC World Test Championship title (which made them the first team in history to win all major ICC Trophies across all formats), and retaining the Ashes on their tour to England. In November, they won the 2023 Cricket World Cup, defeating the host India in the final.

== International grounds ==
Locations of all stadiums which have hosted an international cricket match within Australia

Australia currently plays International cricket at each of the following grounds:

Venue	City	Capacity
Melbourne Cricket Ground	Melbourne	100,024
Perth Stadium	Perth	61,266
Adelaide Oval	Adelaide	53,500
Sydney Cricket Ground	Sydney	48,000
Brisbane Cricket Ground	Brisbane	36,000
Carrara Oval	Gold Coast	21,000
Bellerive Oval	Hobart	20,000
Manuka Oval	Canberra	12,000

== Team colours ==
For Test matches, the team wears cricket whites, with an optional sweater or sweater-vest, with a green and gold V-neck for use in cold weather. The sponsor's (currently Westpac for home matches and Qantas for away matches) logo is displayed on the right side of the chest while the Cricket Australia emblem is displayed on the left. If the sweater is being worn the Cricket Australia emblem is displayed under the V-neck and the sponsor's logo is again displayed on the right side of the chest. The baggy green, the Australian Test cricket cap, is considered an essential part of the cricketing uniform and as a symbol of the national team, with new players being presented with one upon their selection in the team. The cap and the helmet both prominently display the Australian cricketing coat-of-arms instead of the Cricket Australia emblem. At the end of 2011, ASICS was named the manufacturer of the whites and limited over uniforms from Adidas, with the ASICS logo being displayed on the shirt and pants. Players may choose any manufacturer for their other gear (bat, pads, shoes, gloves, etc.).

In One Day International (ODI) cricket and Twenty20 International cricket, the team wears uniforms usually coloured green and gold, the national colours of Australia. There has been a variety of different styles and layouts used in both forms of the limited-overs game, with coloured clothing (sometimes known as "pyjamas") being introduced for World Series Cricket in the late 1970s. The Toyota or Qantas logo is prominently displayed on the shirts and other gears. The current T20I kit consists of green as the primary colour and gold as the secondary colour. The ODI is the opposite of the T20I kit, with gold as the primary colour and green as the secondary colour. However, since Australia beat New Zealand at the MCG in the 2015 Cricket World Cup wearing the gold uniform, it has also become their primary colour, with the hats used being called 'floppy gold', formerly known as 'baggy gold', a limited-overs equivalent to a baggy green. Until the early 2000s and briefly in early 2020, in ODIs, Australia wore yellow helmets, before using green helmets as in test matches.

Former suppliers were Asics (1999), ISC (2000–2001), Fila (2002–2003) and Adidas (2004–2010) among others. Before Travelex (and 3 in test matches), some of the former sponsors were XXXX (1990–1992), Coca-Cola (1993–1998), Fly Emirates (1999) and Carlton & United Breweries (2000–2001).

Years	Kit manufacturer	Primary sponsor
1979–90	Adidas	
1990–93	Unknown	XXXX
1992	ISC	XXXX
1993–98	Unknown	Coca-Cola
1999 WC	Asics	Fly Emirates
2000–03	ISC	
2003–03	Fila	Carlton & United Breweries
2004–07	Adidas	Travelex, 3 (test)
2008–11	Adidas	Victoria Bitter, Commonwealth Bank (test), KFC (T20), Qantas (Away; since 2015)
2012–18	Asics	Victoria Bitter, Commonwealth Bank (test), KFC (T20), Qantas (Away; since 2015)
2018–22	Asics	Alinta Energy (Home), Qantas (Away)
2023–2025	Asics	Toyota (Home), Qantas (Away)
2025–present	Asics	Westpac (Home), Qantas (Away)

== Squad ==
Cricket Australia announced its list of centrally contracted players for the 2026–27 season on 1 April 2026. Players can be upgraded to national contracts throughout the year by earning 12 upgrade points, with a Test worth five points and each ODI and T20I worth two.

This table lists all players who:

- hold a Cricket Australia national contract for 2026–27
- have represented Australia since 18 November 2025
- have been selected in a current national squad (Test, ODI or T20I).

Players without international caps are listed in italics.

Notes

- Cooper Connolly and Matthew Renshaw were upgraded to central contracts.
- Usman Khawaja retired from international cricket in January 2026.
- Glenn Maxwell retired from T20I cricket in November 2026.
- Forms – Formats played for Australia since 18 November 2025
- S/N – Shirt number
- C – Cricket Australia contract (Y = Holds contract)
- Captain – (C) Captain, (VC) Vice-captain

Name	Age	Batting style	Bowling style	State Team	BBL Team	Forms	S/N	C	Captain	Last Test	Last ODI	Last T20I
Batters
Tim David	30	Right-handed	Right-arm off break	Tasmania	Hobart Hurricanes	T20I	85			—N/a	(South Africa) 2023	(Bangladesh) 2026
Jake Fraser-McGurk	24	Right-handed	—N/a	South Australia	Melbourne Renegades	T20I	23			—N/a	(Sri Lanka) 2025	(England) 2026
Travis Head	32	Left-handed	Right-arm off break	South Australia		Test, ODI, T20I	62	Y		(South Africa) 2026	(England) 2026	(Oman) 2026
Marnus Labuschagne	32	Right-handed	Right-arm medium-fast, leg break	Queensland		Test, ODI	33	Y		(South Africa) 2026	(Bangladesh) 2026	(Pakistan) 2022
Nic Maddinson	34	Left-handed	Slow left-arm orthodox	New South Wales	Sydney Thunder	Test	53			(South Africa) 2026	—N/a	(Zimbabwe) 2018
Mitchell Marsh	35	Right-handed	Right-arm medium	Western Australia	Perth Scorchers	ODI, T20I	8	Y	ODI (VC), T20I (C)	(India) 2024	(England) 2026	(Bangladesh) 2026
Matt Renshaw	30	Left-handed	Right-arm off break	Queensland	Brisbane Heat	Test, ODI, T20I	7	Y		(South Africa) 2026	(England) 2026	(Bangladesh) 2026
Lachlan Shaw	23	Right-handed	—N/a	New South Wales	Sydney Sixers	T20I				—N/a	—N/a	—N/a
Steve Smith	37	Right-handed	Right-arm leg break	New South Wales	Sydney Sixers	Test	49	Y	Test (VC)	(South Africa) 2026	(India) 2025	(New Zealand) 2024
Jake Weatherald	32	Left-handed	—N/a	South Australia	Hobart Hurricanes	Test	66	Y		(Bangladesh) 2026	—N/a	—N/a
All-rounders
Sean Abbott	34	Right-handed	Right-arm fast-medium	New South Wales	Sydney Sixers	T20I	77			—N/a	(South Africa) 2025	(Pakistan) 2026
Nikhil Chaudhary	30	Right-handed	Right-arm leg break	Tasmania	Hobart Hurricanes	T20I	44			—N/a	—N/a	(England) 2026
Cooper Connolly	23	Left-handed	Slow left-arm orthodox	Western Australia	Perth Scorchers	Test, ODI, T20I	9	Y		(South Africa) 2026	(England) 2026	(Bangladesh) 2026
Jack Edwards	26	Right-handed	Right-arm medium	New South Wales	Sydney Sixers	ODI, T20I	39			—N/a	(England) 2026	(Pakistan) 2026
Cameron Green	27	Right-handed	Right-arm fast-medium	Western Australia		Test, ODI, T20I	42	Y		(South Africa) 2026	(England) 2026	(Oman) 2026
Aaron Hardie	27	Right-handed	Right-arm medium-fast	Western Australia	Perth Scorchers	T20I	20			—N/a	(South Africa) 2025	(Bangladesh) 2026
Michael Neser	36	Right-handed	Right-arm medium-fast	Queensland	Brisbane Heat	Test	18	Y		(England) 2026	(South Africa) 2023	—N/a
Mitchell Owen	25	Right-handed	Right-arm medium	Tasmania	Hobart Hurricanes	T20I	61			—N/a	(India) 2025	(Pakistan) 2026
Oliver Peake	20	Left-handed	Right-arm off break	Victoria	Melbourne Renegades	ODI	11			—N/a	(England) 2026	—N/a
Liam Scott	25	Right-handed	Right-arm fast-medium	South Australia	Adelaide Strikers	ODI	10			—N/a	(Bangladesh) 2026	—N/a
Matthew Short	31	Right-handed	Right-arm off break	—N/a	Adelaide Strikers	ODI, T20I	5			—N/a	(Bangladesh) 2026	(Pakistan) 2026
Marcus Stoinis	37	Right-handed	Right-arm medium	—N/a	Melbourne Stars	T20I	17			—N/a	(Pakistan) 2024	(Oman) 2026
Beau Webster	32	Right-handed	Right-arm medium, off break	Tasmania	Hobart Hurricanes	Test	21	Y		(South Africa) 2026	—N/a	—N/a
Wicket-keeper-batters
Alex Carey	35	Left-handed	—N/a	South Australia	Adelaide Strikers	Test, ODI	4	Y		(South Africa) 2026	(England) 2026	(New Zealand) 2025
Sam Harper	29	Right-handed	—N/a	Victoria	Melbourne Stars	T20I				—N/a	—N/a	—N/a
Josh Inglis	31	Right-handed	—N/a	Western Australia		Test, ODI, T20I	48	Y		(South Africa) 2026	(England) 2026	(Bangladesh) 2026
Josh Philippe	29	Right-handed	—N/a	New South Wales	Sydney Sixers	T20I	2			—N/a	(India) 2025	(Pakistan) 2026
Pace bowlers
Xavier Bartlett	27	Right-handed	Right-arm fast-medium	Queensland	Brisbane Heat	ODI, T20I	15	Y		—N/a	(England) 2026	(Bangladesh) 2026
Mahli Beardman	21	Right-handed	Right-arm fast-medium	Western Australia	Perth Scorchers	ODI, T20I	40			—N/a	(England) 2026	(Pakistan) 2026
Scott Boland	37	Right-handed	Right-arm fast-medium	Victoria		Test	19	Y		(South Africa) 2026	(South Africa) 2016	(Sri Lanka) 2016
Pat Cummins	33	Right-handed	Right-arm fast	New South Wales		Test, ODI	30	Y	Test (C), ODI (C)	(South Africa) 2026	(South Africa) 2026	(India) 2024
Brendan Doggett	32	Right-handed	Right-arm fast-medium	South Australia	Melbourne Renegades	Test	35	Y		(England) 2025	—N/a	—N/a
Ben Dwarshuis	32	Left-handed	Left-arm fast-medium	New South Wales	Sydney Sixers	ODI, T20I	82			—N/a	(Bangladesh) 2026	(Zimbabwe) 2026
Nathan Ellis	32	Right-handed	Right-arm fast-medium	Tasmania	Hobart Hurricanes	ODI, T20I	12	Y		—N/a	(South Africa) 2026	(Bangladesh) 2026
Josh Hazlewood	35	Left-handed	Right-arm fast-medium	New South Wales		Test, ODI	38	Y		(South Africa) 2026	(South Africa) 2026	(India) 2025
Spencer Johnson	30	Left-handed	Left-arm fast	South Australia	Brisbane Heat	ODI, T20I	54			—N/a	(England) 2026	(Bangladesh) 2026
Riley Meredith	30	Right-handed	Right-arm fast	Tasmania	Hobart Hurricanes	ODI	24			—N/a	(England) 2026	(Scotland) 2024
Jhye Richardson	30	Right-handed	Right-arm fast	Western Australia	Perth Scorchers	Test	60			(England) 2025	(Sri Lanka) 2022	(Sri Lanka) 2022
Billy Stanlake	32	Left-handed	Right-arm fast	Tasmania	Hobart Hurricanes	ODI	52			—N/a	(Zimbabwe) 2026	(Pakistan) 2019
Mitchell Starc	36	Left-handed	Left-arm fast	New South Wales		Test, ODI	56	Y		(South Africa) 2026	(South Africa) 2026	(India) 2024
Spin bowlers
Joel Davies	23	Left-handed	Slow left-arm orthodox	New South Wales	Sydney Sixers	T20I	51			—N/a	—N/a	(Bangladesh) 2026
Matthew Kuhnemann	30	Left-handed	Slow left-arm orthodox	Tasmania	Brisbane Heat	ODI, T20I	50	Y		(Sri Lanka) 2025	(Pakistan) 2026	(Zimbabwe) 2026
Nathan Lyon	38	Right-handed	Right-arm off break	New South Wales		Test	67	Y		(South Africa) 2026	(England) 2019	(Pakistan) 2018
Todd Murphy	26	Left-handed	Right-arm off break	Victoria	Melbourne Stars		36	Y		(Sri Lanka) 2025	—N/a	—N/a
Tanveer Sangha	24	Right-handed	Right-arm leg break	New South Wales	Sydney Thunder	ODI	26			—N/a	(Pakistan) 2026	(India) 2023
Adam Zampa	34	Right-handed	Right-arm leg break	Queensland	Hobart Hurricanes	ODI, T20I	88	Y		—N/a	(England) 2026	(Bangladesh) 2026
Last updated: 18 November 2026

== Coaching staff ==
Position	Name
Head coach	Andrew McDonald
Assistant coach	Andre Borovec
Assistant coach	Daniel Vettori
T20 Consultant	Brad Hodge
Batting coach	Michael Di Venuto
Bowling coach	Adam Griffith
Fielding and Keeping coach	Matthew Wade
Coaching consultant	Michael Hussey
Physiotherapist	Nick Jones
Psychologist	Mary Spillane

=== National selection panel ===
Position	Name
National selector (chairman)	George Bailey
Head coach	Andrew McDonald
National selector	Tony Dodemaide

=== Coaching history ===
- 1986–1996: Bob Simpson
- 1996–1999: Geoff Marsh
- 1999–2007: John Buchanan
- 2007–2011: Tim Nielsen
- 2010–2013: Mickey Arthur
- 2013–2018: Darren Lehmann
- 2018–2022: Justin Langer
- 2022–present: Andrew McDonald

== Test records ==
=== Team ===
- Australia is the most successful Test team in cricketing history. It has won more than 350 Test matches at a rate of almost 47%. The next best performance is by South Africa at 37%.
- Australia have been involved in the only two Tied Tests played. The first occurred in December 1960, against the West Indies in Brisbane. The second occurred in September 1986, against India in Madras (Chennai).
- Australia's largest victory in a Test match came on 24 February 2002. Australia defeated South Africa by an innings and 360 runs in Johannesburg.
- Australia holds the record for the most consecutive wins, with 16. This has been achieved twice; from October 1999 to February 2001 and from December 2005 to January 2008.
- Australia shares the record for the most consecutive series victories winning 9 series from October 2005 to June 2008. This record is shared, with England.
- Australia's highest total in a Test match innings was recorded in Kingston, Jamaica against the West Indies in June 1955. Australia posted 758/8 in their first innings, with five players scoring a century.
- Australia's lowest total in a Test match innings was recorded in Birmingham against England in May 1902. Australia were bowled all out for 36.
- Australia are one of only two teams to have lost a Test match after enforcing the follow-on, having been the losing team in the first three of four such matches, with England becoming the second team to follow a similar fate with their loss to New Zealand in 2023:
  - The first Test of the 1894–95 Ashes.
  - The third Test of the 1981 Ashes.
  - The second Test of the 2000–01 Border–Gavaskar Trophy series against India.
- Against India in March 2013, Australia became the first team in Test history to declare in their first innings and then lose by an innings.
- In the 2013–14 Ashes series, Australia took all 100 wickets on offer in the 5–0 sweep over England.

=== Appearances ===
- Ricky Ponting and Steve Waugh have played in the most Test matches for Australia, both playing in 168 matches.

=== Batting ===
- Charles Bannerman faced the first ball in Test cricket, scored the first runs in Test cricket and also scored the first Test century.
- Charles Bannerman also scored 67.34% of the Australian first innings total in match 1. This record remains to this day as the highest percentage of a completed innings total that has been scored by a single batsman.
- Ricky Ponting has scored the most runs for Australia in Test cricket, with 13,378 runs. Allan Border is second, with 11,174 runs in 265 innings, a record which was broken by Brian Lara during his innings of 226 against Australia, while Steve Waugh has 10,927 from 260 innings.
- Allan Border was the first Australian batsman to pass 10,000 and the first ever batsman to pass 11,000 Test runs.
- Ricky Ponting was the first Australian batsman to pass 12,000 and 13,000 Test runs.
- Matthew Hayden holds the record for the most runs in a single innings by an Australian, with 380 in the first Test against Zimbabwe in Perth in October 2003.
- Donald Bradman holds the record for the highest average by an Australian (or any other) cricketer of 99.94 runs per dismissal. Bradman played 52 Tests, scoring 29 centuries and a further 13 fifties.
- Ricky Ponting holds the record for the most centuries by an Australian cricketer, with 41. Former Australian captain Steve Smith is in second position, with 36 centuries from 206 innings.
- Allan Border holds the record for the most fifties by an Australian cricketer, with 63 in 265 innings.
- Adam Gilchrist holds the record for the fastest century by an Australian.
- Glenn McGrath holds the record for the most ducks by an Australian cricketer, with 35 in 138 innings.

=== Bowling ===
- Billy Midwinter picked up the first five-wicket haul in a Test innings in match 1.
- Fred Spofforth performed Test cricket's first hat-trick by dismissing Vernon Royle, Francis McKinnon and Tom Emmett in successive balls.
- Fred Spofforth also took the first 10-wicket match haul in Test cricket.
- Shane Warne holds the record for the most wickets by an Australian cricketer, with 708 wickets in 145 Test matches.
- Arthur Mailey holds the record for the best bowling figures in an innings by an Australian cricketer, with 9/121 against England in February 1921.
- Bob Massie holds the record for the best bowling figures in a match by an Australian cricketer, with 16/137 against England in June 1972. That was also his first Test match for Australia.
- J. J. Ferris holds the record for the best bowling average by an Australian bowler, taking 61 wickets at 12.70 in his career.
- Clarrie Grimmett holds the record for the most wickets in a Test series, with 44 against South Africa in 1935–36.

=== Fielding and wicketkeeping ===
- Steve Smith holds the record for the most catches in a career by an Australian fielder, with 215 in 123 matches.
- Jack Blackham performed the first stumping in Test cricket in match 1.
- Adam Gilchrist holds the record for the most dismissals in a career by an Australian wicketkeeper, with 416 in 96 matches.

== ODI records ==
=== Team ===
- Australia's highest total in a One-Day International innings is 434/4, scored off 50 overs against South Africa in Johannesburg on 12 March 2006. This was a world record score before the South Africans later surpassed it in the same match.
- Australia's lowest total in a One-Day International innings is 70. This score has occurred twice; once against England in 1977 and once against New Zealand in 1986.
- Australia's largest victory in One-Day International cricket is 309 runs. This occurred against The Netherlands at the 2023 World Cup in India.
- Australia are the only team in the history of the World Cup to win 3 consecutive tournaments; 1999, 2003 and 2007.
- Australia went undefeated at the World Cup for a record 34 consecutive matches. After being defeated by Pakistan in 1999, Australia would remain unbeaten until they were again defeated by Pakistan in 2011.
- Australia have won the most ODI World Cups – 6.

=== Appearances ===
- Ricky Ponting has played in the most One-Day International matches for Australia, playing 375 matches.

=== Batting ===
- Ricky Ponting has the most One-Day International runs by an Australian batsman, with 13,589.
- Ricky Ponting has the most One-Day International centuries by an Australian batsman, with 29.
- Ricky Ponting has the most One-Day International fifties by an Australian batsman, with 82.
- Ricky Ponting is the first Australian batsman to pass 10,000 One-Day International runs.
- Glenn Maxwell has the highest individual not out score in an innings by an Australian batsman, with 201*.
- Shane Watson has hit the most sixes in a single innings by an Australian player, with 15.
- Phillip Hughes was the only Australian player to score a century on debut in One-Day International cricket.

=== Bowling ===
- Glenn McGrath & Brett Lee have the most One-Day International wickets by an Australian bowler, with 380.
- Glenn McGrath has the best bowling figures by an Australian bowler, with 7/15.
- Brett Lee has the most five-wicket hauls by an Australian bowler, with 9.

=== Fielding and wicketkeeping ===
- Ricky Ponting has the most catches taken by an Australian fielder, with 159.
- Adam Gilchrist has the most dismissals by an Australian wicketkeeper, with 470.
- Adam Gilchrist has the most catches taken by an Australian wicketkeeper, with 417.
- Adam Gilchrist has the most stumpings made by an Australian wicketkeeper, with 55.

== Tournament history ==
A red box around the year indicates tournaments played within Australia

=== World Test Championship ===
ICC World Test Championship record
Year	League stage										Final host	Final	Final position
Year	Pos	Matches					Ded	PC	Pts	PCT	Final host	Final	Final position
Year	Pos	P	W	L	D	T	Ded	PC	Pts	PCT	Final host	Final	Final position
2019–21	3/9	14	8	4	2	0	4	480	332	69.2	Rose Bowl, England	DNQ	3rd
2021–23	1/9	19	11	3	5	0	0	228	152	66.7	The Oval, England	Beat India by 209 runs	Champions
2023–25	2/9	19	13	4	2	0	10	228	154	67.5	Lord's, England	Lost to South Africa by 5 wickets	Runners-up

=== Cricket World Cup ===
World Cup record
Year	Round	Position	GP	W	L	T	NR
(England) 1975	Runners-up	2/8	5	3	2	0	0
(England) 1979	Group stage	6/8	3	1	2	0	0
(England) (Wales) 1983	Group stage	6/8	6	2	4	0	0
(India) (Pakistan) 1987	Champions	1/8	8	7	1	0	0
(Australia) (New Zealand) 1992	Round-Robin stage	5/9	8	4	4	0	0
(India) (Pakistan) (Sri Lanka) 1996	Runners-up	2/12	8	5	3	0	0
(England) (Wales) (Scotland) (Republic of Ireland) (Netherlands) 1999	Champions	1/12	10	7	2	1	0
(South Africa) (Zimbabwe) (Kenya) 2003	Champions	1/14	11	11	0	0	0
(Cricket West Indies) 2007	Champions	1/16	11	11	0	0	0
(India) (Sri Lanka) (Bangladesh) 2011	Quarter-finals	6/14	7	4	2	0	1
(Australia) (New Zealand) 2015	Champions	1/14	9	7	1	0	1
(England) (Wales) 2019	Semi-finals	4/10	10	7	3	0	0
(India) 2023	Champions	1/10	11	9	2	0	0
(South Africa) (Zimbabwe) (Namibia) 2027	TBD						
(India) (Bangladesh) 2031	TBD						
Total	6 titles	13/13	106	78	25	1	2

=== T20 World Cup ===
T20 World Cup record
Year	Round	Position	GP	W	L	T	NR
(South Africa) 2007	Semi-finals	3/12	6	3	3	0	0
(England) 2009	Group Stage	11/12	2	0	2	0	0
(Cricket West Indies) 2010	Runners-up	2/12	7	6	1	0	0
(Sri Lanka) 2012	Semi-finals	3/12	6	4	2	0	0
(Bangladesh) 2014	Super 10	8/16	4	1	3	0	0
(India) 2016	Super 10	6/16	4	2	2	0	0
(United Arab Emirates) (Oman) 2021	Champions	1/16	7	6	1	0	0
(Australia) 2022	Super 12	5/16	5	3	1	0	1
(Cricket West Indies) (United States) 2024	Super 8	6/20	7	5	2	0	0
(India) (Sri Lanka) 2026	Group Stage	9/20	4	2	2	0	0
(Australia) (New Zealand) 2028	Qualified as co-hosts						
(England) (Wales) (Republic of Ireland) (Scotland) 2030	TBD						
Total	1 title	10/10	52	32	19	0	1

=== Champions Trophy ===
Champions Trophy record
Year	Round	Position	GP	W	L	T	NR
(Bangladesh) 1998	Quarter-finals	8/9	1	0	1	0	0
(Kenya) 2000	Quarter-finals	5/11	1	0	1	0	0
(Sri Lanka) 2002	Semi-finals	4/12	3	2	1	0	0
(England) 2004	Semi-finals	3/12	3	2	1	0	0
(India) 2006	Champions	1/10	5	4	1	0	0
(South Africa) 2009	Champions	1/8	5	4	0	0	1
(England) (Wales) 2013	Group stage	7/8	3	0	2	0	1
(England) (Wales) 2017	Group stage	7/8	3	0	1	0	2
(Pakistan) (United Arab Emirates) 2025	Semi-finals	4/8	4	1	1	0	2
(India) 2029	TBD						
Total	2 Titles	9/9	28	13	9	0	6

=== Commonwealth Games ===
Commonwealth Games record
Year	Round	Position	GP	W	L	T	NR
(Malaysia) 1998	Runners-up	2/16	5	4	1	0	0
Total	0 Titles	1/1	5	4	1	0	0

== Honours ==
=== ICC ===
Titles

- World Test Championship
  - Champions (1): 2021–2023
  - Runners-up (1): 2023–2025
- World Cup
  - Champions (6): 1987, 1999, 2003, 2007, 2015, 2023
  - Runners-up (2): 1975, 1996
- T20 World Cup
  - Champions (1): 2021
  - Runners-up (1): 2010
- Champions Trophy
  - Champions (2): 2006, 2009

Awards

- ICC Test Championship
  - Winners (8): 2003–2009, 2016
- ICC ODI Championship
  - Winners (9): 2002–2007, 2010–2012

=== Others ===
- Commonwealth Games
  - Silver medal (1): 1998

== Series trophies ==
Test Cricket features multiple trophies competed for when teams play one another in a Test series. Australia contests a trophy with seven other Test nations, currently holding all seven.

Name of trophy	Holder	Opponent	First contested	Last contested
The Ashes	Australia	England	1882–83	2025–26
Frank Worrell Trophy	Australia	West Indies	1960–61	2025
Trans-Tasman Trophy	Australia	New Zealand	1985–86	2023–24
Border–Gavaskar Trophy	Australia	India	1996–97	2024–25
Southern Cross Trophy	Australia	Zimbabwe	1999–2000	2003–04
Warne–Muralitharan Trophy	Australia	Sri Lanka	2007–08	2024–25
Benaud–Qadir Trophy	Australia	Pakistan	2021–22	2023–24

== Traditions ==
=== Under the Southern Cross I Stand ===
The team song is "Under the Southern Cross I Stand", which is sung by the players after every victory and "treated with reverential consideration and respect" within the team. The official lyrics are as follows, though when it is sung by the players, the word "little" in the last line is instead replaced by "bloody" or the expletive "fucking".

Under the Southern Cross I Stand
A sprig of wattle in my hand,
A native of my native land,
Australia you little beauty.

The authorship of this "Under the Southern Cross I Stand" is credited to former wicketkeeper Rod Marsh, who was apparently inspired by Henry Lawson's 1887 poem, "Flag of the Southern Cross". Marsh initially had the role of leading the team in singing it and, on his retirement, passed it on to Allan Border. The other players to have taken on the role are David Boon (when Border took over the captaincy), Ian Healy (on Boon's retirement), Ricky Ponting (on Healy's retirement), Justin Langer (when Ponting took over the captaincy), Michael Hussey (on Langer's retirement), Nathan Lyon (on Hussey's retirement). With Nathan Lyon's departure from the team due to injury after the Second Ashes Test at Lord's in 2023, custody of the song has passed to wicketkeeper Alex Carey.

=== Nerds and Julios ===
External videos
- "Julios v Nerds" golf competition, 2010, on Cricket Australia YouTube channel

Since the 1990s, team members have identified themselves or their teammates as either "nerds" or "Julios". The "nerds" have cheap haircuts, are polite off-field, and let their playing performance define them. The Julios have fashionable hairstyles and wear snappy clothes. The term "Julio" is reported to refer to Spanish singer Julio Iglesias. In a 2016 podcast, Australian fast bowler Josh Hazlewood wrote that the "nerds" tended to be fast bowlers, and gave himself as an example.

== See also ==
- Allan Border Medal
- Australia A cricket team
- Australia national women's cricket team
- Australian Cricket Hall of Fame
- List of Australia national cricket captains
- List of Australia ODI cricketers
- List of Australia Test cricketers
- List of Australia Test wicket-keepers
- List of Australia Twenty20 International cricketers

Preceded by None	Test match playing teams 15 March 1877 (Jointly with England)	Succeeded by South Africa
