= Southern Cross Trophy =

- Countries: Australia; Zimbabwe
- Administrator: Cricket Australia and Zimbabwe Cricket
- Format: Test cricket
- First edition: 1999–2000 (Zimbabwe)
- Latest edition: 2003–04 (Australia)
- Tournament format: Test Series
- Number of teams: 2
- Current trophy holder: Australia (2003–04)
- Most successful: Australia (2 series wins)
- Most runs: (Australia) Matthew Hayden (501 runs)
- Most wickets: (Australia) Andy Bichel (10 wickets)

The Southern Cross Trophy is a cricket trophy that was awarded to the winner of Test series between Australia and Zimbabwe. The Trophy was first contested in a single-Test series in Zimbabwe in 1999, which was accompanied by a series of three One Day Internationals. In the first Test of the second and last series of the Trophy in the 2003–04 season, Matthew Hayden scored a then-record highest Test score by a batsman, a 380 that won him the player of the series award.

== List of Test series ==
Season	Host	Tests	Australia	Zimbabwe	Drawn	Result
1999–00	Zimbabwe	1	1	0	0	Australia won
2003–04	Australia	2	2	0	0	Australia won
