= Cricket at the Commonwealth Games =

Optional sport

- Most recent season or competition: Cricket at the 2022 Commonwealth Games
- Sport: Cricket
- Founded: M: 1998; W: 2022
- First season: 1998
- Administrator: Commonwealth Games Federation (CGF)
- No. of teams: M: 16; W: 8
- Most recent champions: M: South Africa (1st title); W: Australia (1st title)
- Most titles: M: South Africa (1 title); W: Australia (1 title)

Cricket is an optional sport at the quadrennial Commonwealth Games. It first appeared at the 1998 Games, with a men's tournament seeing South Africa defeat Australia by 4 wickets in the final. Matches were played over 50 overs and had List A status rather than being full One Day Internationals.

The sport returned to the Games' programme at the 2022 Games, with a women's tournament taking place. Matches were played under the Twenty20 format, with the tournament won by Australia. A women's Twenty20 tournament had been planned to be included in the 2026 Games, with a men's tournament also considered. However the withdrawal of original hosts Victoria, led replacement hosts Glasgow to announce only a streamlined event with cricket one of several sports removed from the program.

As is normal at the multi-sport events, Caribbean countries that enter participate as separate nations rather than the amalgamated West Indies team. The England team likewise represents only England and not Wales.

== Venues ==
- (Malaysia) Kuala Lumpur 1998: PKNS (Finals), Tenaga National Sports Complex (Heats, Bronze playoff), Kelab Aman (Heats), Royal Military College (Heats), Rubber Research Institute Ground (Heats), Victoria Institution (Heats)
- (England) Birmingham 2022: Edgbaston Cricket Ground

== Men's tournament ==
=== Results ===
| Year | Host | Final | | | Bronze medal match | | | Number of teams |
| Year | Host | Gold medal | Score | Silver medal | Bronze medal | Score | Fourth place | Number of teams |
|---|---|---|---|---|---|---|---|---|
| 1998; Details | Kuala Lumpur, Malaysia | South Africa | South Africa won by 4 wickets Scorecard | Australia | New Zealand | New Zealand won by 51 runs Scorecard | Sri Lanka | 16 |

=== Performance by nation ===
| Nation | 1998 | Years |
|---|---|---|
| Antigua and Barbuda | GP | 1 |
| Australia | 2nd | 1 |
| Bangladesh | GP | 1 |
| Barbados | GP | 1 |
| Canada | GP | 1 |
| India | GP | 1 |
| Jamaica | GP | 1 |
| Kenya | GP | 1 |
| Malaysia | GP | 1 |
| New Zealand | 3rd | 1 |
| Northern Ireland | GP | 1 |
| Pakistan | GP | 1 |
| Scotland | GP | 1 |
| South Africa | 1st | 1 |
| Sri Lanka | 4th | 1 |
| Zimbabwe | GP | 1 |
| Nations | 16 | 16 |

Legend

- GP – Group stage / First round

== Women's tournament ==
=== Results ===
| Year | Host | Final | | | Bronze medal match | | | Number of teams |
| Year | Host | Gold medal | Score | Silver medal | Bronze medal | Score | Fourth place | Number of teams |
|---|---|---|---|---|---|---|---|---|
| 2022; Details | Birmingham, England | Australia | Australia won by 9 runs Scorecard | India | New Zealand | New Zealand won by 8 wickets Scorecard | England | 8 |

=== Performance by nation ===
| Nation | 2022 | Years |
|---|---|---|
| Australia | 1st | 1 |
| Barbados | GP | 1 |
| England | 4th | 1 |
| India | 2nd | 1 |
| New Zealand | 3rd | 1 |
| Pakistan | GP | 1 |
| South Africa | GP | 1 |
| Sri Lanka | GP | 1 |
| Nations | 8 | 8 |

Legend

- GP – Group stage / First round

== Medal table ==
=== Total ===
| Rank | Nation | Gold | Silver | Bronze | Total |
|---|---|---|---|---|---|
| 1 | Australia | 1 | 1 | 0 | 2 |
| 2 | South Africa | 1 | 0 | 0 | 1 |
| 3 | India | 0 | 1 | 0 | 1 |
| 4 | New Zealand | 0 | 0 | 2 | 2 |
| Totals (4 entries) | | 2 | 2 | 2 | 6 |

=== Men ===
| Rank | Nation | Gold | Silver | Bronze | Total |
|---|---|---|---|---|---|
| 1 | South Africa | 1 | 0 | 0 | 1 |
| 2 | Australia | 0 | 1 | 0 | 1 |
| 3 | New Zealand | 0 | 0 | 1 | 1 |
| Totals (3 entries) | | 1 | 1 | 1 | 3 |

=== Women ===
| Rank | Nation | Gold | Silver | Bronze | Total |
|---|---|---|---|---|---|
| 1 | Australia | 1 | 0 | 0 | 1 |
| 2 | India | 0 | 1 | 0 | 1 |
| 3 | New Zealand | 0 | 0 | 1 | 1 |
| Totals (3 entries) | | 1 | 1 | 1 | 3 |

== See also ==
- Cricket at the Asian Games
- Cricket at the Summer Olympics
