= History of Australian cricket =

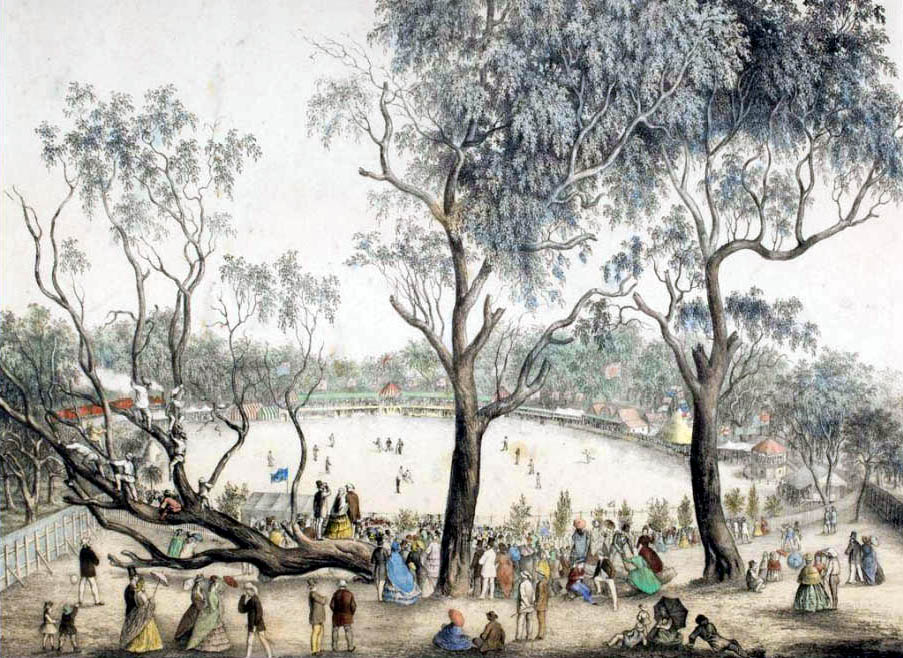
Cricket at the MCG in 1864

The History of Australian cricket began over 210 years ago. The first recorded cricket match in Australia took place in Sydney in December 1803 and a report in the Sydney Gazette on 8 January 1804 suggested that cricket was already well established in the infant colony. By 1826, clubs including the Currency Cricket Club, the Military Cricket Club and the Australian Cricket Club had been formed. Hyde Park and the Racecourse were the venue for these organised matches. The formation of clubs in Van Diemen's Land (later Tasmania) was not far behind with clubs formed in Hobart in 1832 and Launceston (1841). In Western Australia a match was arranged in 1835 between the "builders" (probably architects and engineers) of the new Government House and a team of labourers and "mechanics" (an archaic term for trades people). In what would later become Victoria, in 1838, the Melbourne Cricket Club was formed – it would become arguably Australia's most exclusive and influential cricket club. In 1839, a club was formed in South Australia.

Intercolonial cricket in Australia started with a visit by cricketers from Victoria to Tasmania in February 1851. The match was played in Launceston on 11–12 February with Tasmania winning by 3 wickets. Another three matches between the two teams were played before 1854 but in time the crossing of Bass Strait became less attractive to the Victorians and the focus turned to the neighbouring colony of New South Wales. These matches attracted large crowds, including a crowd of 15,000 at a match in Sydney in January 1853. Boards of control were formed in the various colonies: New South Wales in 1857, Victoria in 1864 and South Australia in 1871.

== Early tours ==
The first tour by an English team to Australia was in 1861–62, organised by the catering firm of Spiers and Pond as a private enterprise. Captained by HH Stephenson, the team largely consisted of cricketers from Surrey and while not wholly representative was reasonably strong. While the locals efforts, even when receiving odds, were mostly in vain, the tour was popular with spectators and highly profitable for the cricketers and promoters alike. A further tour followed in 1863–64, led by George Parr and was even more successful than the last.

== First Australian team to tour England ==
In 1866–67, Tom Wills, a troubled but brilliant sportsman who had captained the Victorian cricket team in 1856, led an all-Aboriginal cricket team on an Australian tour as its captain-coach.

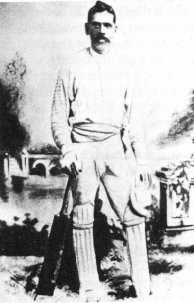
Johnny Mullagh, one of the batsmen in the 1868 tour of England

Another tour was launched in 1868, thus Aboriginal cricketers constituted the first Australian teams to tour England. The 1868 team was captained by Charles Lawrence, a member of Stephenson's team in 1861 who remained in Australia, and mainly recruited from the Harrow and Edenhope areas of the Wimmera region in western Victoria. Including outstanding cricketers such as Johnny Mullagh, the team played 47 matches, winning 14, drawing 19 and losing 14. In addition to cricket, the players demonstrated athletic prowess before, after and during games, including throwing boomerangs and spears. The heavy workload and inclement weather took its toll with King Cole contracting a fatal case of tuberculosis during the tour.

Further tours by English teams took place in 1873-74 (featuring the most notable cricketer of the age W.G. Grace) and 1876–77. The 1876-77 season was notable for a match between a combined XI from New South Wales and Victoria and the touring Englishmen at the Melbourne Cricket Ground played on 15–19 March. This match, later to be recognised as the first Test Match, was won by Australia by 45 runs, thanks mainly to an unbeaten 165 by Charles Bannerman. The result of this match was seen by Australians and Englishmen as a reflection of the rising standard of Australian cricket.

== Origin of the Ashes and Sheffield Shield ==
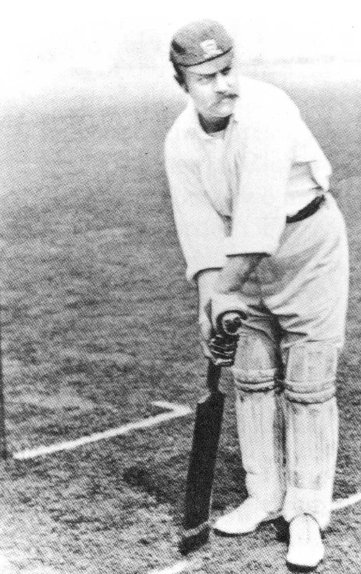
Billy Murdoch, who captained the Australia team during the first Ashes test in 1882

The rising standards of Australian cricket was further established during the first representative tour of England in 1878. While the Australians did not play a representative English team on this tour, the efforts of players such as Billy Murdoch, Fred Spofforth and Jack Blackham attracted much public interest. A return visit in 1878–79 is best remembered for a riot and by the time Australia visited England in 1880, playing the first Test in England at The Oval, a system of international tours was well established. A famous victory on the 1882 tour of England resulted in the placement of a satirical obituary in an English newspaper, The Sporting Times. The obituary stated that English cricket had died, and the body will be cremated and the ashes taken to Australia. The English media then dubbed the next English tour to Australia (1882–83) as the quest to regain The Ashes.

The Sheffield Shield, the premier first-class cricket competition in Australia, was established in 1892 by the Australasian Cricket Council, the first attempt at a national cricket board. The Shield was purchased from funds donated by Lord Sheffield, the financier of the English tour of 1891–92. The council was formed with representation from New South Wales, Victoria and South Australia and with the aim of regulating intercolonial cricket and organising international tours. This last aim met resistance from the leading players of the day such as George Giffen. The players had previously run tours as a private enterprise, splitting profits amongst themselves and were unwilling to relinquish control of appointing a captain and team selection. Conflict between players and administrators would become a running theme in Australian cricket.

== Golden Age ==
The era from the mid-1890s to the World War I has been described as Australian cricket's golden age. This era saw the emergence of players such as Monty Noble, Clem Hill and in particular Victor Trumper, who was idolised by the Australian public. It also saw the continuing battle between the Melbourne Cricket Club and the players on one side with the state boards and the new Australian Board of Control on the other. The dispute was over the organisation of international tours and the revenue streams it created. It culminated in 1912 with the withdrawal of six leading players; Trumper, Hill, Warwick Armstrong, Vernon Ransford, Albert Cotter and Hanson "Sammy" Carter from the tri-nations series in England that year and a fistfight between Hill and his fellow selector Peter McAlister. The tour was unsuccessful and dogged by controversy.

== Birth of Women's Cricket Leagues ==
The founding mother of organised women's cricket in Australia was the young Tasmanian, Lily Poulett-Harris, who captained the Oyster Cove team in the league she created in 1894. Lily's obituary, from her death a few years later in 1897, states that her league was almost certainly the first to be formed in the colonies. Following this, a league was founded in Rockhampton and the Victoria Women's Cricket Association was founded in 1905.

== The Great War ==
The Great War lead to the suspension of both international and Sheffield Shield cricket and the enlistment of many cricketers in the AIF. After the war, a team consisting of cricketers enlisted in the AIF toured the United Kingdom. The Australian Imperial Forces cricket team was strong, including cricketers such as Herbie Collins, Bert Oldfield and the all-rounder, Jack Gregory, all of whom would play a large part in the fortunes of the national team in the future.

== Between the wars: Bradman and Bodyline ==
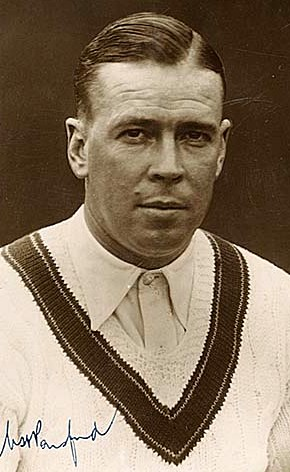
Bill Ponsford is one of only two cricket players to have scored 400 or more runs in a single first-class innings on more than one occasion. The other is Brian Lara of the West Indies.

International cricket recommenced with a tour by a weakened England team in 1920–21. The strong Australian team, led by Armstrong and with a bowling attack spearheaded by Gregory and Ted McDonald won the series 5–0, the first time this was achieved in an Ashes series. The 1920s was an era of batting dominance. The Victorian opening batsman, Bill Ponsford was the chief destroyer of bowling attacks, scoring 429 against Tasmania in 1922–23 and topping that in 1927–28 with an innings against Queensland of 437. In between these innings, in 1926–27, his Victorian team made 1,107, the highest first class innings total to date. Ponsford's contribution was a mere 352.

However, the greatest run machine in the history of Australian cricket was yet to come. Don Bradman, born in Cootamundra and raised in Bowral was 20 when he made his Test debut in the first Test of the 1928–29 series against England. He made 18 and 1 and was promptly dropped for the next Test. Recalled for the third Test in Melbourne, he scored 112 in the second innings to establish his place in the team for the next twenty years. During his illustrious career, he would hold the records for the highest individual Test innings and the most centuries in Test cricket and when he retired in 1948 he had the highest Test batting average, the last a record he still holds. He scored 117 first class centuries, still the only Australian to score a century of centuries and was knighted for services to cricket.

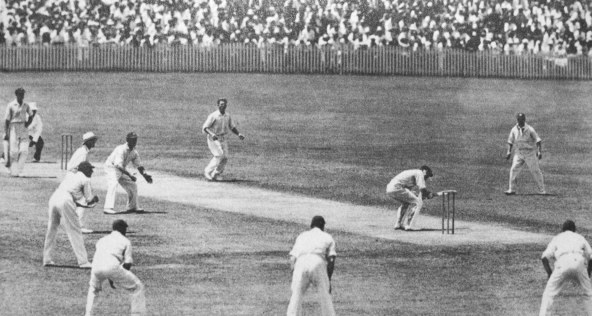
Bodyline bowling in Brisbane, 1932

All that was still to come for Bradman when he toured England with the Australian team in 1930. Bradman scored heavily, 974 runs at an average of 139.14 including a then world record 334 at Leeds, two other double centuries and another single. Watching these displays of batting was Douglas Jardine, playing for Surrey. Following discussions with other observers such as Percy Fender and George Duckworth, he developed a tactic to limit the prodigious run scoring of Bradman and the others. The tactic, originally called fast leg theory and later called bodyline involved fast short pitched bowling directed at the batsman's body and a packed leg side field. Appointed captain of England for the 1932-33 series in Australia, Jardine was able to put these theories into practice.

Combined with bowlers of the speed and accuracy of Harold Larwood and Bill Voce, the tactic required batsmen to risk injury in order to protect their wicket. In the third Test in Adelaide, Larwood struck Australian captain Bill Woodfull above the heart and fractured wicket-keeper Bert Oldfield's skull. The crowd was incensed and public feeling in Australia was high. A minor diplomatic incident ensued and for a time it appeared that cricketing relations between the two nations would be cut and the tour called off. Eventually diplomacy prevailed and the tour continued, England winning the series 4–1. The effect of bodyline can be seen by looking at Bradman's batting average, a respectable 56.57, the highest for Australia that series, but much lower than his Shield average of 150 over the same period.

In December 1934, the Australian women's team played the English women in the first women's Test match at the Brisbane Exhibition Ground. Despite a 7 wicket haul to Anne Palmer in the first innings, the English women were too strong and won by 9 wickets.

== Post War consolidation ==
Once again, war brought a stop to Shield and Test cricket as Australia mobilised for World War II. Immediately after the end of the war in Europe in 1945, an Australian Services XI played a series of Victory Tests in England. The team was captained by Lindsay Hassett and it saw the emergence of the charismatic all-rounder Keith Miller. The series was drawn 2–2. After the retirement of Bradman in 1948, Hassett, Miller and all-rounder Ray Lindwall formed the nucleus of the Australian team. They were later joined by leg spinning all-rounder, Richie Benaud and batsman Neil Harvey.

In 1951 Menzies enthusiasm for cricket, lead him to inaugurate the annual Prime Minister's XI cricket match in 1951 at Manuka Oval in Canberra. Robert Menzies favourite pastime or 'obsession' as some say was to watch and follow cricket. The first game was against the visiting international team the West Indies. Menzies was a trustee of the Melbourne Cricket Club and knew many cricketers including Donald Bradman whom he declared was the 'undisputed master batsman of his time'. Menzies found cricket a useful diplomatic tool that Commonwealth nations had in common, as he stated that Great Britain and Australia were of the same blood, allegiance, history and instinctive mental processes.

By the 1958–59 series, Benaud was captain of the Australian side and managed to recover the Ashes. The 1960–61 series at home against the West Indies was widely regarded as one of the most memorable. A commitment by Benaud and his West Indian offsider Frank Worrell to entertaining cricket revived lagging interest in the sport. The gripping series, including the first tied Test, saw Australia win 2-1 and become the inaugural holders of the newly commissioned Frank Worrell Trophy. The West Indian team was held in such affection that a ticker-tape parade in their honour prior to their departure from Australia attracted a crowd of 300,000 Melburnians to wish them farewell.

In the late 1950s and early 1960s, there was an ongoing controversy regarding illegal bowling actions. A number of bowlers, Australian and international were accused of throwing or "chucking" over this period including the South Australian pair of Alan Hitchcox and Peter Trethewey and New South Welshman, Gordon Rorke. The controversy reached a high point when Ian Meckiff was recalled to the Australian team for the first Test of the 1963–64 series against South Africa. Called on to bowl his first over, he was no-balled 4 times by umpire Colin Egar for throwing before being removed from the attack by his skipper, Benaud. As a consequence, Meckiff retired from all levels of cricket after the match and Egar received death threats from persons aggrieved at his call.

== Rebel tours and revolution ==
The 1970s saw players and administrators once again come into conflict. Poor scheduling saw Australia visit South Africa immediately after a tour to India in 1969–70. This would be the last tour to South Africa prior to the application of international sporting sanctions designed to oppose the policy of apartheid. The tired Australians came across a very strong South African team in conditions vastly different from the subcontinent, and were subsequently beaten 4–0. A request by the Australian Cricket Board for the players to play a further match in South Africa was met with resistance by the players, led by the captain, Bill Lawry. During the following home series against England, Lawry was sacked as captain and replaced by the South Australian batsman, Ian Chappell. Lawry remains the only Australian captain to be sacked in the middle of a Test series. Chappell, part of a younger and more assertive generation, saw the board's treatment of Lawry's as disgraceful and made a pledge to never allow himself to be placed in the same situation.

Greg Chappell, Ian's younger brother, succeeded him as captain in 1975–76 and lead the Australian team in the Centenary Test in Melbourne in March 1977. A celebration of 100 years of Test cricket, Australia won the Test by 45 runs, the precise result of the corresponding game 100 years earlier.

While Australian cricket celebrated, the Australian media tycoon Kerry Packer was making plans to wrest away the television rights for Australian cricket. During the 1977 Ashes tour, the cricket world became aware that Packer had signed 35 of the world's top cricketers for a series of matches, including 18 Australians, 13 of whom were part of the tour party. World Series Cricket, as the breakaway group was known split Australian cricket in two for nearly three years. Former Australian captain, Bob Simpson was recalled from retirement to lead an inexperienced team in a home series against India in 1977–78, won 3–2 and then a tour to the West Indies, marred by an ugly riot. For the 1978–79 Ashes series, he was replaced by the young Victorian, Graham Yallop. The subsequent thrashing, a 5–1 victory for England, and the success of World Series Cricket forced the Australian Cricket Board to concede on Packer's terms.

The settlement between the ACB and WSC lead to the introduction of a series of innovations including night cricket, coloured clothing and an annual limited overs tri-series called the World Series Cup. It also signalled the return of the champion cricketers Greg Chappell, Dennis Lillee and Rod Marsh. Their retirement at the end of the 1983–84 season was quickly followed by a series of tours to South Africa by a rebel Australian team in breach of the sporting sanctions imposed on the apartheid regime. The combined effect was to leave Australian cricket at its nadir under reluctant captain, Allan Border, losing Test series at home (2–1) and away (1–0) to New Zealand in 1985–86.

== Modern dominance ==
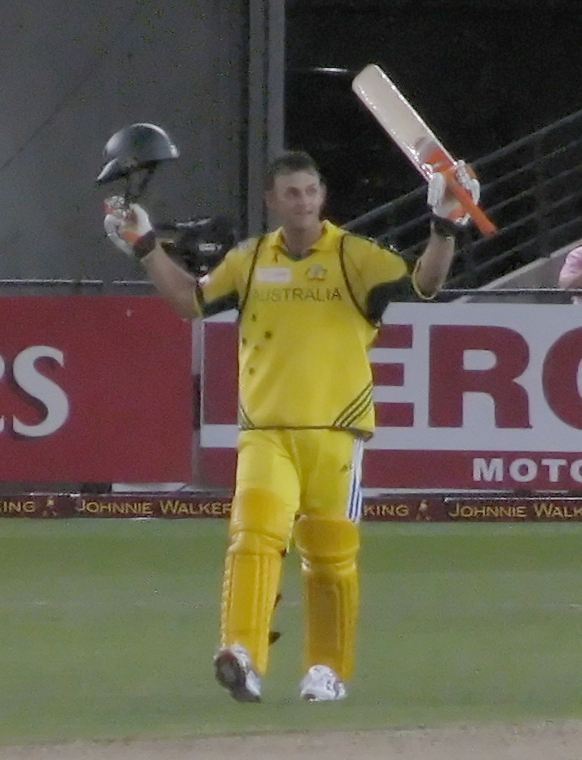
Adam Gilchrist celebrating scoring a century against the World XI in the second ICC Super Series 2005 match at Telstra Dome (7 October 2005).

The long road back for Australian cricket started in India in 1986–87. Border, along with Bob Simpson in a new role as coach, set out to identify a group of players that a team could form around. These players showed some of the steel necessary in the famous tied Test at the M. A. Chidambaram Stadium in Chennai. Returning to the subcontinent for the World Cup in 1987, Australia surprised the cricket world by defeating England at Eden Gardens in Kolkata to win the tournament with a disciplined brand of cricket. By the 1989 Ashes tour, the development of players such as Steve Waugh and David Boon and the discovery of Mark Taylor and Ian Healy had reaped rewards. The 4–0 drubbing of England was the first time since 1934 that Australia had recovered the Ashes away from home and marked the resurgence of Australia as a cricketing power. Australia would hold the Ashes for the next 16 years.

The most successful leg spin bowler in the history of the game, Shane Warne, made his debut in 1991-92 in the third Test against India at the Sydney Cricket Ground. He had an undistinguished Test debut, taking 1/150 off 45 overs, and recording figures of 1/228 in his first Test series. From this modest beginning, Warne dominated Australian cricket for 15 years, taking 708 wickets at an average of 25.41. When the fast medium bowler, Glenn McGrath was first selected in the Australian team for the Perth test against New Zealand in 1993–94, the core of a highly successful bowling attack was formed. In 1994–95, under new captain Taylor, the Australians defeated the then dominant West Indies in the Caribbean to recover the Frank Worrell Trophy for the first time since 1978 and staked a claim to be considered the best team in the world.

Following a disappointing World Cup at home in 1992, Australia then entered a run of extraordinarily successful World Cup campaigns; runners up to Sri Lanka in 1996 in the subcontinent, fighting back after early setbacks to win in England in 1999 and unbeaten on their way to another victory in South Africa. The change in captain from Taylor to Steve Waugh made little difference in the success of the Australian team. Waugh made a slightly rocky start to his term as captain, drawing 2–2 with the West Indies in the Caribbean and losing to Sri Lanka 1–0 away. A victory in the Australian team's first ever Test match against Zimbabwe was the start of an unparalleled 16 Test winning streak. The streak was finally ended in 2001 in Kolkata with a remarkable victory by India after being asked to follow-on. For Waugh, India would remain unconquered territory.

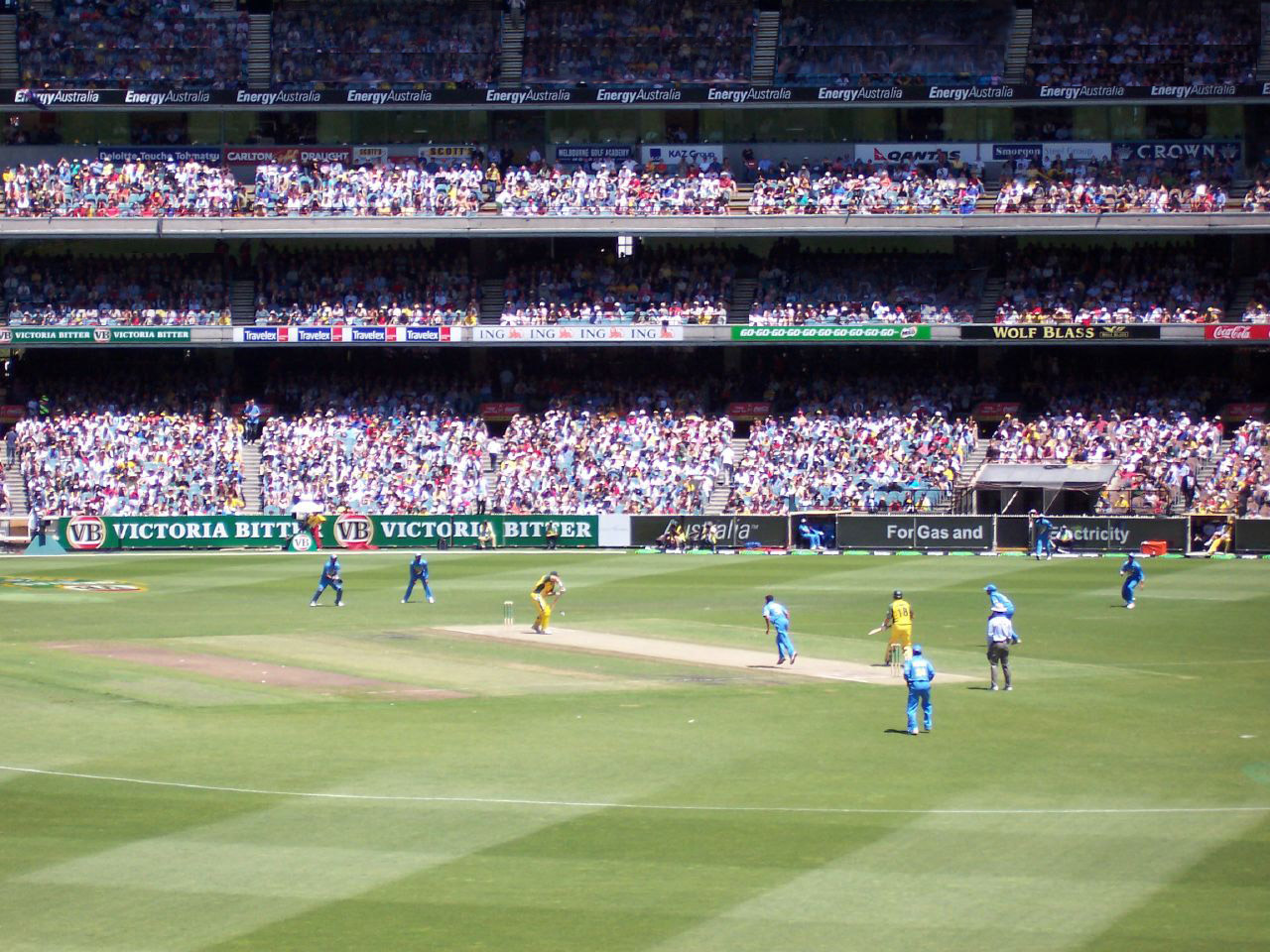
A One day match at the MCG between Australia and India, 2004

Australia's success was not without its detractors. Accusations of racism were made against the Australian team, one incident leading to a suspension for Darren Lehmann in 2003. Contacts between Warne and batsman Mark Waugh and illegal bookmakers, at first kept under cover by the ACB, were later revealed by the Australian press, sparking accusations of hypocrisy given Australian cricket's earlier attitude toward match fixing allegations. Warne would later be suspended from all forms of cricket for 12 months after testing positive to banned diuretics hydrochlorothiazide and amiloride. The brand of cricket played by the Australian team was praised for its spirit and aggressiveness but critics charged that this aggressive approach lead to ugly sledging incidents such as the confrontation between McGrath and West Indian batsman, Ramnaresh Sarwan at the Antigua Recreation Ground in 2003. Tasmanian batsman Ricky Ponting would admit to an alcohol problem after incidents in India and in Sydney.

A rehabilitated Ponting would succeed Waugh as captain in 2004. While injured for most of the 2004–05 series against India, his team under acting captain Adam Gilchrist defeated India in India, the first Australian series win in India since Bill Lawry's team in 1969–70. A 2–1 defeat in the 2005 Ashes series in England was quickly avenged at home with a 5–0 thrashing of England in 2006–07. The whitewash was the first in an Ashes series since Warwick Armstrong's team in 1920–21. Following the series, the successful bowling combination of McGrath and Warne retired from Test cricket, with a record that will be hard to match as the Australian team endeavours to retain its place at the top of world cricket. Most recently Australia won the 2007 Cricket World Cup in the Caribbean and were unbeaten through the tournament. Australian cricketer Matthew Hayden scored the most runs in the tournament. The finals happened to be Glenn McGrath's last match and he was also the highest wicket taker of the tournament and the player of the tournament.

The 2015 Cricket World Cup was jointly hosted by Australia and New Zealand from 14 February to 29 March 2015. Fourteen teams played 49 matches in 14 venues, with Australia staging 26 games at grounds in Adelaide, Brisbane, Canberra, Hobart, Melbourne, Perth and Sydney. Australia defeated New Zealand by 7 wickets to win their fifth ICC Cricket World Cup in front of a record crowd of 93,013. The winning captain Michael Clarke, retired from ODIs with immediate effect after the final match.

On 12 January 2019, Australia won the first ODI against India at the Sydney Cricket Ground by 34 runs, to record their 1,000th win in international cricket.

The second ICC World Test Championship started on 4 August 2021 and finished with Australia lifting the trophy after defeating India in the final in June 2023. Thereafter, Australia drew 2–2 with England in The Ashes retaining the trophy and maintaining their unbeaten streak in England since 2001.This was followed by the 2023 Cricket World Cup in which Australia beat India in the finals.

In the 2024–25 season, Australia continued their dominance in Test Cricket by beating India 4–1 in the Border–Gavaskar Trophy series & reclaiming the trophy after a decade. Australia qualified for the finals of the 2025 World Test Championship, by finishing second in the WTC Standings. However, in the final Australia lost to South Africa.

In July 2025, Australia concluded a historic 8–0 sweep of the West Indies winning 3 Test matches and 5 T20I games

== Cricket World Cup Record ==
Year	Round	Games	Won	Tied/No result	Lost	Captain
(England) 1975	Runner Up	5	3	0	2	Ian Chappell
(England) 1979	Group Stage	3	1	0	2	Kim Hughes
(England) 1983	Group Stage	6	2	0	4	Kim Hughes
(India) (Pakistan) 1987	Champions	8	7	0	1	Allan Border
(Australia) (New Zealand) 1992	Round-Robin Stage	8	4	0	4	Allan Border
(India) (Pakistan) (Sri Lanka) 1996	Runners Up	8	5	0	3	Mark Taylor
(England) (Scotland) (Republic of Ireland) (Netherlands) 1999	Champions	10	8	0	2	Steve Waugh
(South Africa) (Zimbabwe) (Kenya) 2003	Champions	11	11	0	0	Ricky Ponting
(Cricket West Indies) 2007	Champions	11	11	0	0	Ricky Ponting
(India) (Bangladesh) (Sri Lanka) 2011	Quarter-finals	7	4	1	2	Ricky Ponting
(Australia) (New Zealand) 2015	Champions	9	7	1	1	Michael Clarke
(England) (Wales) 2019	Semi-finals	10	7	0	3	Aaron Finch
(India) 2023	Champions	11	9	0	2	Pat Cummins
Total	Six time Champions	96	70	2	24	

White: Group/Round-Robin Stage

Green: Quarter-finals/Super Six

Light Blue: Semifinals

Silver: Runner Up

Gold: Champions

=== Teamwise record ===
Opponent	M	W	L	T	NR	Win %	First played
Afghanistan	2	2	0	0	0	100	2015
Bangladesh	4	3	0	0	1	75	1999
Canada	2	2	0	0	0	100	1979
England	8	5	3	0	0	62.50	1975
India	13	8	5	0	0	61.53	1983
Ireland	1	1	0	0	0	100	2007
Kenya	3	3	0	0	0	100	1996
Namibia	1	1	0	0	0	100	2003
Netherlands	2	2	0	0	0	100	2003
New Zealand	11	8	3	0	0	72.72	1987
Pakistan	10	6	4	0	0	60	1975
Scotland	2	2	0	0	0	100	1999
South Africa	6	3	2	1	0	50	1992
Sri Lanka	11	8	2	0	1	72.72	1975
West Indies	10	5	5	0	0	50	1975
Zimbabwe	9	8	1	0	0	88.88	1983
Total	92	66	23	0	3	71.73	–

== See also ==
- Cricket in Australia
- History of the Australian cricket team
- History of Australian cricket to 1876
- History of Australian cricket from 1876–77 to 1890
- History of Australian cricket from 1890-91 to 1900
- History of Australian cricket from 1900-01 to 1918
- History of Australian cricket from 1918-19 to 1930
- History of Australian cricket from 1930-31 to 1945
- History of Australian cricket from 1945-46 to 1960
- History of Australian cricket from 1960-61 to 1970
- History of Australian cricket from 1970–71 to 1985
- History of Australian cricket from 1985-86 to 2000
- History of Australian cricket from 2000-01
- List of years in Australian Test cricket
