= Frank Kerr =

Frank Kerr may refer to:

- Frank John Kerr (1918–2000), Australian astronomer and physicist
- Frank Kerr (cricketer) (1916–1943), New Zealand cricketer and RNZAF pilot
- Frank Kerr (footballer) (1889–1977), Australian rules footballer and Australian Army officer
