= Frank Kerr (cricketer) =

New Zealand cricketer

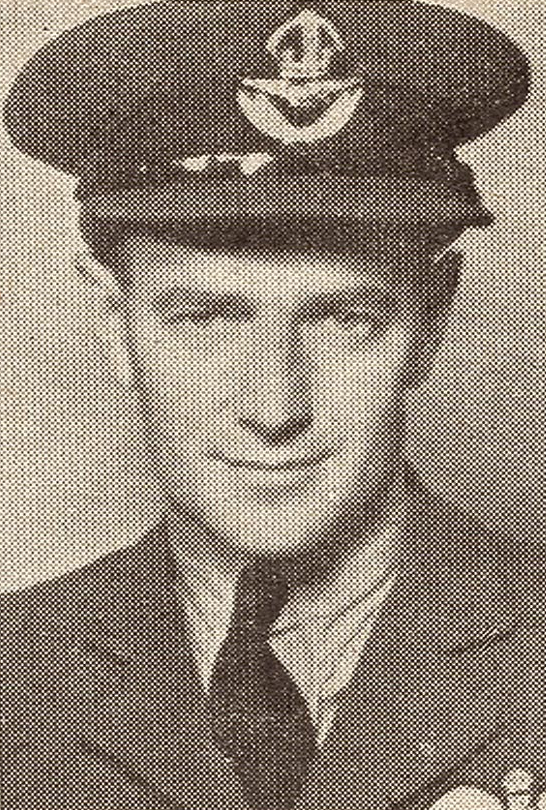

Personal information
- Full name: Frank Bevan Kerr
- Born: 28 October 1916; Perth, Western Australia
- Died: 24 July 1943 (aged 26); British Solomon Islands
- Batting: Right-handed
- Role: Batsman

Domestic team information
- Years: Team
- 1934/35–1936/37: Otago

Career statistics
Competition	First-class
Matches	8
Runs scored	193
Batting average	13.78
100s/50s	0/0
Top score	44*
Catches/stumpings	0/–
- Source: CricketArchive, 8 August 2015

Frank Bevan Kerr (28 October 1916 – 24 July 1943) was an Australian born Royal New Zealand Air Force (RNZAF) pilot who was killed on active service during World War II. He played first-class cricket for Otago in the mid-1930s

Kerr was born in Perth, Western Australia, to Gwendoline Lisle and H. Douglas Kerr. All his cricket, however, was played in New Zealand. His first-class debut for Otago came when he was 18, against Canterbury during the 1934–35 Plunket Shield season. A right-handed batsman, Kerr played another three Plunket Shield games the following season, as well as a match against the touring MCC team. Against Auckland in the first match of the season, he scored 44 not out from eighth in the batting order, his highest first-class score. Later in the season, he was promoted to third in the batting order, but had little success. Kerr's final first-class matches came during the 1936–37 season, when he played three games for only 28 runs (at an average of 4.66). His final high-level match for Otago, however, came against Canterbury in December 1942, though it did not have first-class status.

By that time, Kerr was enlisted as a pilot officer in the RNZAF. He was killed in the Solomon Islands in July 1943, as the co-pilot of a Lockheed Hudson flying a patrol between Bougainville and New Georgia. The plane was attacked by eight Japanese Zeros, and was eventually forced to ditch near a small island off the coast of Vella Lavella. The five crew, including Kerr, survived the ditching, but were afterward strafed by the Japanese, with only one member, Sgt. Trevor Ganley, surviving. Kerr was survived by his wife, Flora Margaret Mary Kerr and his son, Douglas Anthony Kerr.
