= History of Australian cricket from 1970–71 to 1985 =

In the history of Australian cricket from the 1970–71 season until 1985, notable Australian players include brothers Ian and Greg Chappell, Jeff Thomson, Dennis Lillee, Rod Marsh and Doug Walters.

== Events ==
The key event in this period was the advent of World Series Cricket, which ran from 1977 to 1979.

== Domestic cricket ==
Western Australia had a very strong team during this period when they won the Sheffield Shield seven times.

=== Sheffield Shield winners ===
- 1970–71 – South Australia
- 1971–72 – Western Australia
- 1972–73 – Western Australia
- 1973–74 – Victoria
- 1974–75 – Western Australia
- 1975–76 – South Australia
- 1976–77 – Western Australia
- 1977–78 – Western Australia
- 1978–79 – Victoria
- 1979–80 – Victoria
- 1980–81 – Western Australia
- 1981–82 – South Australia
- 1982–83 – New South Wales
- 1983–84 – Western Australia
- 1984–85 – New South Wales

== International tours of Australia ==
=== England 1970–71 ===
Ray Illingworth captained the English cricket team in Australia in 1970–71, playing as England in the 1970–71 Ashes series against the Australians, and as the MCC in their other matches on the tour. They had a successful tour, but an acrimonious one as Illingworth's team often argued with their own management and the Australian umpires. When they arrived the Australian selector Neil Harvey called them "rubbish". and others labelled them "Dad's Army" because of the seniority of the players, whose average age was over 30, but these experienced veterans beat the younger Australian team. They are the only touring team to play a full Test series in Australia without defeat.

=== New Zealand 1970–71 ===
New Zealand took part in the V&G Knockout Cup, a limited overs competition for the Australian state teams. New Zealand were defeated in the semi-final by Western Australia.

=== Rest of the World XI 1971–72 ===
A Rest of the World cricket team captained by Gary Sobers toured Australia in the 1971–72 season and played a total of 16 matches. The World XI played five matches against Australia but these were not ranked as Test matches. The team played three limited overs internationals against Australia and the remaining games were first-class fixtures against each of the Australian state teams.

The World XI squad included Gary Sobers, Graeme Pollock, Clive Lloyd, Sunil Gavaskar, Zaheer Abbas, Tony Greig, Farokh Engineer, Intikhab Alam, Rohan Kanhai, Bob Taylor and Bishen Bedi

=== Pakistan 1972–73 ===
The Pakistan national cricket team toured Australia in the 1972–73 season and played 3 Test matches against Australia. Australia won the series 3–0.

=== New Zealand 1972–73 ===
New Zealand took part in the Coca-Cola Knockout Cup along with the Australian state teams. New Zealand won the competition, defeating Queensland by 38 runs in the final.

=== New Zealand 1973–74 ===
The New Zealand national cricket team toured Australia in the 1973–74 season and played 3 Test matches. Australia won the series 2–0 with one match drawn.

=== England 1974–75 ===
The England cricket team toured Australia in the 1974–75 season to play a six-match Test series against Australia for The Ashes. The tour was organised by the Marylebone Cricket Club and matches outside the Tests were played under the MCC name. Australia won the series 4–1 and regained The Ashes.

=== West Indies 1975–76 ===
The West Indies cricket team toured Australia in the 1975–76 season and played 6 Test matches against Australia. Australia won the series 5–1.

=== Pakistan 1976–77 ===
The Pakistan national cricket team toured Australia in the 1976–77 season and played 3 Test matches against Australia. The series was drawn 1–1.

=== England 1976–77 ===
England visited Australia in the 1976–77 season to take part in a Centenary Test at Melbourne Cricket Ground to celebrate 100 years of Test cricket. By an amazing coincidence, Australia won the match by 45 runs, which was the same result as the original Test a century earlier.

=== India 1977–78 ===
The India national cricket team toured Australia in the 1977–78 season to play 5 Test matches. Australia won the test series 3–2.

=== England 1978–79 ===
The England cricket team toured Australia in the 1978–79 season to play a six-match Test series against Australia for The Ashes. England won the series 5–1, thereby retaining The Ashes.

This series was often over shadowed by Kerry Packer's World Series Cricket which meant many players from both sides were absent, including Greg Chappell. Australia were more handicapped which opened the way for England and their captain Mike Brearley.

=== Pakistan 1978–79 ===
The Pakistan national cricket team toured Australia in the 1978–79 season and played 2 Test matches against Australia. The series was drawn 1–1.

=== West Indies and England 1979–80 ===
As part of the settlement between World Series Cricket and the Australian board, two series were hastily arranged in which Australia played three Tests against both England and the West Indies. These series are seen by many as semi-official only: for example, The Ashes were not at stake.

==== Australia v West Indies ====
- [1st Test] at Brisbane Cricket Ground – match drawn
- [2nd Test] at Melbourne Cricket Ground – West Indies won by 10 wickets
- [3rd Test] at Adelaide Oval – West Indies won by 408 runs

==== Australia v England ====
- [1st Test] at Western Australia Cricket Association Ground – Australia won by 138 runs
- [2nd Test] at Sydney Cricket Ground – Australia won by 6 wickets
- [3rd Test] at Melbourne Cricket Ground – Australia won by 8 wickets

=== India 1980–81 ===
The India national cricket team toured Australia in the 1980–81 season to play 3 Test matches. The series was drawn 1–1.

=== New Zealand 1980–81 ===
The New Zealand national cricket team toured Australia in the 1980–81 season and played 3 Test matches. Australia won the series 2–0 with one match drawn.

=== Pakistan 1981–82 ===
The Pakistan national cricket team toured Australia in the 1981–82 season and played 3 Test matches against Australia. Australia won the series 2–1.

=== West Indies 1981–82 ===
The West Indies cricket team toured Australia in the 1981–82 season and played 3 Test matches against Australia. The series was drawn 1–1.

=== England 1982–83 ===
The England cricket team toured Australia in the 1982–83 season to play a five-match Test series against Australia for The Ashes. Australia won the series 2–1 with two matches drawn and thereby regained The Ashes.

=== New Zealand 1982–83 ===
The New Zealand national cricket team toured Australia in the 1982–83 season and played a total of 21 matches, mostly One Day Internationals in the Benson & Hedges World Series Cup against Australia and England. New Zealand reached the finals of the competition but lost to Australia 2–0. A highlight of the finals series was a 21-ball half century from Lance Cairns at the Melbourne Cricket Ground containing 6 sixes. This was a world record for One Day Internationals at the time.

=== Sri Lanka 1982–83 ===
The Sri Lanka national cricket team toured Australia in the 1982–83 season. Although Sri Lanka had just acquired Test status, no Tests were played on this short tour which consisted of two first-class matches versus New South Wales and Tasmania; and a limited overs game versus Victoria.

=== Pakistan 1983–84 ===
The Pakistan national cricket team toured Australia in the 1983–84 season and played 5 Test matches against Australia. Australia won the series 2–0.

=== West Indies 1983–84 ===
The West Indies team took part in the Benson & Hedges World Series Cup, a limited overs tournament also involving Australia and Pakistan. West Indies won the competition, beating Australia in the final.

=== England 1984–85 ===
The England team made a short visit to Australia in February 1985 following a tour of India. The England team, captained by David Gower, played three limited overs matches in Australia:

- 14 Feb – versus Sydney Metropolitan at Village Green, Sydney
- 19 Feb – versus Victoria at Eastern Oval, Ballarat (ListA match)
- 28 Feb – versus New South Wales Second XI at Manly Oval, Sydney

=== West Indies 1984–85 ===
The West Indies cricket team toured Australia in the 1984–85 season and played 5 Test matches against Australia. West Indies won the series 3–1 with one match drawn. The West Indies won the first three Tests quite easily against a very weak Australian team. Then captain Kim Hughes lost the captaincy due to his and the Australian's poor form after the Second Test and Allan Border took over. The Fourth Test at Melbourne ended West Indies' then world record of 11 consecutive Test wins as Australia held out for a draw. West Indies lost the Fifth Test by an innings at Sydney where Clive Lloyd played the last of his 110 Tests.

=== Sri Lanka 1984–85 ===
The Sri Lanka team played a series of limited overs matches in the Benson and Hedges World Series Cup which also involved Australia and West Indies. Sri Lanka was eliminated in the qualifying stage of the competition which was won by West Indies. See : series itinerary

== External sources ==
- CricketArchive – itinerary of Australian cricket
