= Frank Kerr (footballer) =

Australian rules footballer

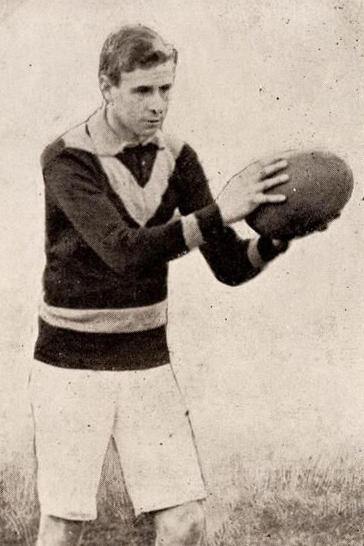
- Kerr in 1910

Personal information
- Full name: Frank Robison Kerr
- Born: 5 April 1889; Hawthorn, Victoria
- Died: 3 May 1977 (aged 88); Kew, Victoria

Playing career^{1}
Years	Club	Games (Goals)
1909–11, 1913	University	40 (10)
- ^{1} Playing statistics correct to the end of 1913.

Captain Frank Robison Kerr DSO (5 April 1889 – 3 May 1977) was an Australian rules footballer who played with University in the Victorian Football League (VFL).

An all-round sportsman, Kerr was awarded a Triple Blue at Melbourne University for athletics, cricket and football. In addition to his 40 senior games in the VFL, he also played pennant cricket for four seasons and captained the Melbourne University Athletics Club.

Kerr, who graduated from Melbourne University with a medical degree, was the Victorian selected to be a Rhodes Scholar in 1913. Retired from football, Kerr moved to England and continued his studies at University College.

His academic career was interrupted by World War I, during which he spent time in France with Britain's Royal Army Medical Corps. In 1915 he was awarded the Distinguished Service Order (DSO) for showing "conspicuous gallantry and splendid devotion to duty" during fighting in Givenchy, when he twice crawled under the parapet to bring in wounded soldiers, while under fire from the Germans who were within 70 yards.

Kerr completed his studies when he returned to England and practised medicine for three years.

Back in Melbourne, Kerr was appointed Commonwealth Medical Officer in 1925.
