= History of Australian cricket from 1945–46 to 1960 =

This article describes the history of Australian cricket from the 1945–46 season until 1960.

Notable Australian players during this period include Don Bradman, Arthur Morris, Ray Lindwall, Keith Miller, Neil Harvey, Alan Davidson and Richie Benaud.

== Domestic cricket ==
Western Australia surprised everyone by winning the Sheffield Shield in the team's debut season 1947–48. But for the rest of this period and until the mid-1960s, domestic Australian cricket was dominated by New South Wales.

=== Sheffield Shield winners ===
- 1945–46 – not contested
- 1946–47 – Victoria
- 1947–48 – Western Australia
- 1948–49 – New South Wales
- 1949–50 – New South Wales
- 1950–51 – Victoria
- 1951–52 – New South Wales
- 1952–53 – South Australia
- 1953–54 – New South Wales
- 1954–55 – New South Wales
- 1955–56 – New South Wales
- 1956–57 – New South Wales
- 1957–58 – New South Wales
- 1958–59 – New South Wales
- 1959–60 – New South Wales

== International tours of Australia ==
=== England 1946–47 ===
For more information about this tour, see : English cricket team in Australia in 1946-47

=== India 1947–48 ===
For more information about this tour, see : Indian cricket team in Australia in 1947-48

=== England 1950–51 ===
For more information about this tour, see : English cricket team in Australia in 1950-51

=== West Indies 1951–52 ===
For more information about this tour, see : West Indian cricket team in Australia in 1951-52

=== South Africa 1952–53 ===
For more information about this tour, see : South African cricket team in Australia in 1952-53

=== New Zealand 1953–54 ===
The New Zealand national team toured Australia in March 1954 and played three first-class matches including its first-ever meeting with Western Australia at the WACA Ground in Perth.

New Zealand defeated Western Australia by 184 runs and then South Australia by 8 wickets. They drew with Victoria to complete their most successful tour of Australia to date. Bert Sutcliffe was their most outstanding player, scoring a century in each of the three games while John Reid made 160 and 64 to help Sutcliffe save the game against Victoria.

See : CricketArchive tour itinerary

=== England 1954–55 ===
For more information about this tour, see : English cricket team in Australia in 1954-55

=== England 1958–59 ===
For more information about this tour, see : English cricket team in Australia in 1958-59

== External sources ==
- CricketArchive — itinerary of Australian cricket
