= List of years in Australian Test cricket =

This article gives a chronological list of years in Australian Test cricket (descending order), with series, notable matches, and events listed with their respective years. The list of years commences in 1877, the year of the first cricket Test played between Australia and England.

Note: inclusion of death notes are for Australian Test captains, and significant figures within the game. Results of Test matches show close or large wins or losses, and ties. Individual batting scores or bowling figures show significant performances. See List of Australia Test cricket records.

== 21st century ==
=== 2010s ===
2020 India beat Australia in Australia

2017

2016

- Indian cricket team in Australia in 2015–16, the 5-ODI series is won by Australia 4–1, the 3-T20 series is won by India 3–0.
- Australian cricket team in New Zealand in 2015–16 Australia won the 2 match test series 2-0.
- Australian cricket team in Sri Lanka in 2016, the 3-Test series was won 3-0 by Sri Lanka.
- Pakistani cricket team in Australia in 2016–17, the 3-Test series was won 3-0 by Australia.

2015

- Australian cricket team in the West Indies in 2015, the 2-Test series is won by Australia 2–0.
- Adam Voges 130* on debut vs West Indies at Roseau.
- Australian cricket team in England and Ireland in 2015, the 5-Test series is won by England 3–2.
- New Zealand cricket team in Australia in 2015–16, the 3-Test series is won by Australia 2–0.
- David Warner scores a century in both innings vs New Zealand at Brisbane.
- First day-night Test cricket match is held in Adelaide using a pink ball.
- West Indian cricket team in Australia in 2015–16, the 3-Test series is won by Australia 2–0.
- Death of Richie Benaud.

2014

- Australian cricket team in South Africa in 2013–14, the 3-Test series is won by Australia 2–1.
- David Warner scores a century in both innings vs South Africa at Cape Town.
- Australian cricket team against Pakistan in the UAE in 2014–15, the 2-Test series is won by Pakistan 2–0.
- Pakistan defeats Australia by 356 runs at Abu Dhabi.
- Indian cricket team in Australia in 2014–15, the 4-Test series is won by Australia 2–0.
- David Warner scores a century in both innings vs India at Adelaide.
- Josh Hazlewood 5/68 on debut vs India at Brisbane.
- Ryan Harris and Chris Rogers named Wisden Cricketers of the Year.
- Death of Ian Craig.
- Death of Phillip Hughes.

2013

- Australian cricket team in India in 2012–13, the 4-Test series is won by India 4–0.
- Australian cricket team in England in 2013, the 5-Test series is won by England 3–0.
- England defeats Australia by 347 runs at Lord's.
- English cricket team in Australia in 2013–14, the 5-Test series is won by Australia 5–0.

2012

- Michael Clarke 329* vs India at Sydney.
- Ricky Ponting & Michael Clarke 386 for the 4th wicket vs India at Adelaide.
- Australian cricket team in the West Indies in 2011–12, the 3-Test series is won by Australia 2–0.
- Sri Lankan cricket team in Australia in 2012–13, the 3-Test series is won by Australia 3–0.
- South African cricket team in Australia in 2012–13, the 3-Test series is won by South Africa 1–0.

2011

- Australian cricket team in Sri Lanka in 2011, the 3-Test series is won by Australia 1–0.
- Nathan Lyon dismisses Sri Lankan batsman Kumar Sangakkara with his first ball in Test cricket at Galle.
- Nathan Lyon 5/34 on debut vs Sri Lanka at Galle.
- Shaun Marsh 141 on debut vs Sri Lanka at Pallekele.
- Australian cricket team in South Africa in 2011–12, the 2-Test series is drawn 1–1.
- Australia 47 vs South Africa at Newlands.
- Pat Cummins 6/79 on debut vs South Africa at Johannesburg.
- Australia defeats South Africa by 2 wickets at Johannesburg.
- New Zealand cricket team in Australia in 2011–12, the 2-Test series is drawn 1–1.
- James Pattinson 5/27 on debut vs New Zealand at Brisbane.
- New Zealand defeats Australia by 7 runs at Hobart.
- Indian cricket team in Australia in 2011–12, the 4-Test series is won by Australia 4–0.

2010

- Australian cricket team in New Zealand in 2009–10, the 2-Test series is won by Australia 2–0.
- Australian cricket team against Pakistan in England in 2010, the 2-Test series is drawn 1–1.
- Australian cricket team in India in 2010–11, the 2-Test series is won by India 2–0.
- India defeats Australia by 1 wicket at Mohali.
- English cricket team in Australia in 2010–11, the 5-Test series is won by England 3–1.
- Peter Siddle takes a hat-trick vs England at Brisbane.
- Ryan Harris scores a king pair vs England at Adelaide.
- Michael Clarke named Wisden Cricketer of the Year.

=== 2000s ===
2009

- Australian cricket team in South Africa in 2008–09, the 3-Test series is won by Australia 2–1.
- Marcus North 117 on debut vs South Africa at Johannesburg.
- Phillip Hughes scores a century in both innings vs South Africa at Durban.
- Australian cricket team in England in 2009, the 5-Test series is won by England 2–1.
- West Indian cricket team in Australia in 2009–10, the 3-Test series is won by Australia 2–0.
- Pakistani cricket team in Australia in 2009–10, the 3-Test series is won by Australia 3–0.

2008

- Australian cricket team in the West Indies in 2008, the 3-Test series is won by Australia 2–0.
- Australian cricket team in India in 2008–09, the 4-Test series is won by India 2–0.
- Jason Krejza 8/215 on debut vs India at Nagpur.
- New Zealand cricket team in Australia in 2008–09, the 2-Test series is won by Australia 2–0.
- South African cricket team in Australia in 2008–09, the 3-Test series is won by South Africa 2–1.
- Death of Bill Brown.

2007

- Sri Lankan cricket team in Australia in 2007–08, the 2-Test series is won by Australia 2–0.
- Indian cricket team in Australia in 2007–08, the 4-Test series is won by Australia 2–1.

2006

- Ricky Ponting scores a century in both innings vs South Africa at Sydney.
- Australian cricket team in South Africa in 2005–06, the 3-Test series is won by Australia 3–0.
- Stuart Clark 5/55 on debut vs South Africa at Cape Town.
- Ricky Ponting scores a century in both innings vs South Africa at Kingsmead.
- Australia defeats South Africa by 2 wickets at Johannesburg.
- Australian cricket team in Bangladesh in 2005–06, the 2-Test series is won by Australia 2–0.
- Australia plays its first Test at Chittagong.
- Jason Gillespie 201* as a nightwatchman vs Bangladesh at Chittagong.
- English cricket team in Australia in 2006–07, the 5-Test series is won by Australia 5–0.
- Ricky Ponting and Brett Lee named as Wisden Cricketers of the Year.

2005

- Australian cricket team in New Zealand in 2004–05, the 3-Test series is won by Australia 2–0.
- Ricky Ponting scores a century in both innings vs West Indies at Brisbane.
- Australian cricket team in England in 2005, the 5-Test series is won by England 2–1.
- England defeat Australia by 2 runs at Edgbaston.
- West Indian cricket team in Australia in 2005–06, the 3-Test series is won by Australia 3–0.
- South African cricket team in Australia in 2005–06, the 3-Test series is won by Australia 2–0.

2004

- Australian cricket team in Sri Lanka in 2003–04, the 3-Test series is won by Australia 3–0.
- Sri Lankan cricket team in Australia in 2004 the 2-Test series is won by Australia 1–0.
- Matthew Hayden scores a century in both innings vs Sri Lanka at Cairns.
- Australian cricket team in India in 2004–05, the 4-Test series is won by Australia 2–1.
- Michael Clarke 151 on debut vs India at Bangalore.
- New Zealand cricket team in Australia in 2004–05, the 2-Test series is won by Australia 2–0.
- Pakistani cricket team in Australia in 2004–05, the 3-Test series is won by Australia 3–0.
- Australia defeat Pakistan by 491 runs at Perth.
- Ian Harvey named as Wisden Cricketer of the Year.
- Death of David Hookes.

2003

- Bangladesh cricket team in Australia in 2003, the 3-Test series is won by Australia 3–0.
- Australia plays its first Test at Darwin.
- Australia plays its first Test at Cairns.
- Australian cricket team in the West Indies in 2003, the 4-Test series is won by Australia 3–1.
- Zimbabwean cricket team in Australia in 2003–04, the 2-Test series is won by Australia 2–0.
- Matthew Hayden 380 vs Zimbabwe at Perth. (Note: Current highest Australian Test score)
- Australia 735-6d vs Zimbabwe at Perth.
- Indian cricket team in Australia in 2003–04, the 4-Test series is drawn 1–1.
- Matthew Hayden named Wisden Cricketer of the Year.

2002

- Australian cricket team in South Africa in 2001–02, the 3-Test series is won by Australia 2–1.
- Australia defeats South Africa by an innings and 360 runs at Johannesburg.
- English cricket team in Australia in 2002–03, the 5-Test series is won by Australia 4–1.
- Matthew Hayden scores a century in both innings vs England at Brisbane.
- Australia defeats England by 384 runs at Brisbane.
- Adam Gilchrist, Jason Gillespie and Damien Martyn named Wisden Cricketers of the Year.

2001

- Australian cricket team in India in 2000–01, the 3-Test series is won by India 2–1.
- Adam Gilchrist scores a king pair vs India at Kolkata.
- India defeats Australia by 171 runs after following-on at Kolkata.
- Australian cricket team in England in 2001, the 5-Test series is won by Australia 4–1.
- New Zealand cricket team in Australia in 2001–02, the 3-Test series is drawn 0–0.
- South African cricket team in Australia in 2001–02, the 3-Test series is won by Australia 3–0.
- Justin Langer and Darren Lehmann named as Wisden Cricketers of the Year.
- Death of Don Bradman.

2000

- Australian cricket team in New Zealand in 1999–2000, the 3-Test series is won by Australia 3–0.
- West Indian cricket team in Australia in 2000–01, the 5-Test series is won by Australia 5–0.
- Glenn McGrath takes a hat-trick vs West Indies at Perth.
- Tom Moody named as Wisden Cricketer of the Year.

== 20th century ==
=== 1990s ===
1999

- Australian cricket team in the West Indies in 1998–99, the 4-Test series is drawn 2–2.
- West Indies defeats Australia by 1 wicket at Bridgetown.
- Australian cricket team in Sri Lanka in 1999, the 3-Test series is won by Sri Lanka 1–0.
- Australian cricket team in Zimbabwe in 1999–2000, the 1-Test series is won by Australia 1–0.
- Pakistani cricket team in Australia in 1999–2000, the 3-Test series is won by Australia 3–0.
- Indian cricket team in Australia in 1999–2000, the 3-Test series is won by Australia 3–0.
- Brett Lee 5/47 on debut vs India at Melbourne.

1998

- Australian cricket team in India in 1997–98, the 3-Test series is won by India 2–1.
- India defeats Australia by an innings and 219 runs at Calcutta.
- Australian cricket team in Pakistan in 1998–99, the 3-Test series is won by Australia 1–0.
- Mark Taylor 334* vs Pakistan at Peshawar. (Note: Then highest Australian Test score)
- English cricket team in Australia in 1998–99, the 5-Test series is won by Australia 3–1.
- Matthew Elliott, Stuart Law and Glenn McGrath named as Wisden Cricketers of the Year.
- Death of Ian Johnson.

1997

- Australian cricket team in South Africa in 1996–97, the 3-Test series is won by Australia 2–1.
- Steve Waugh & Greg Blewett 385 for the 5th wicket vs South Africa at Johannesburg.
- Australia defeats South Africa by 2 wickets at Port Elizabeth.
- Australian cricket team in England in 1997, the 6-Test series is won by Australia 3–2.
- Steve Waugh scores a century in both innings vs England at Old Trafford.
- New Zealand cricket team in Australia in 1997–98, the 3-Test series is won by Australia 2–0.
- Simon Cook 5/39 on debut vs New Zealand at Perth.
- South African cricket team in Australia in 1997–98, the 3-Test series is won by Australia 1–0.

1996

- Australian cricket team in India in 1996–97, the 1-Test series is won by India 1–0.
- West Indian cricket team in Australia in 1996–97, the 5-Test series is won by Australia 3–2.
- Death of Ray Lindwall.

1995

- Greg Blewett 102* on debut vs England at Adelaide.
- Peter McIntyre scores a pair on debut vs England at Adelaide.
- Australian cricket team in the West Indies in 1994–95, the 5-Test series is won by Australia 2–1.
- Pakistani cricket team in Australia in 1995–96, the 3-Test series is won by Australia 2–1.
- Sri Lankan cricket team in Australia in 1995–96, the 3-Test series is won by Australia 3–0.

1994

- South Africa defeats Australia by 5 runs at Sydney.
- Australian cricket team in South Africa in 1993–94, the 3-Test series is drawn 1–1.
- Australian cricket team in Pakistan in 1994–95, the 3-Test series is won by Pakistan 1–0.
- Pakistan defeats Australia by 1 wicket at Karachi.
- Damien Fleming takes a hat-trick vs Pakistan at Rawalpindi.
- English cricket team in Australia in 1994–95, the 5-Test series is won by Australia 3–1.
- Shane Warne takes a hat-trick vs England at Melbourne.
- David Boon, Ian Healy, Merv Hughes and Shane Warne named Wisden Cricketers of the Year.

1993

- West Indies defeats Australia by 1 run at Adelaide.
- Australian cricket team in New Zealand in 1992–93, the 3-Test series is drawn 1–1.
- Australian cricket team in England in 1993, the 6-Test series is won by Australia 4–1.
- New Zealand cricket team in Australia in 1993–94, the 3-Test series is won by Australia 2–0.
- Australia defeats New Zealand by an innings and 222 runs at Hobart.
- South African cricket team in Australia in 1993–94, the 3-Test series is drawn 1–1.
- Death of Lindsay Hassett.

1992

- South Africa defeats Australia by 5 runs at Sydney.
- Australian cricket team in Sri Lanka in 1992, the 3-Test series is won by Australia 1–0.
- Australia defeats Sri Lanka by 16 runs at Colombo.
- West Indian cricket team in Australia in 1992–93, 5-Test series is won by West Indies 2–1.

1991

- Mark Waugh 138 on debut vs England at Adelaide.
- Australian cricket team in the West Indies in 1990–91, the 5-Test series is won by West Indies 2–1.
- West Indies defeats Australia by 343 runs at Bridgetown.
- Indian cricket team in Australia in 1991–92, the 5-Test series is won by Australia 4–0.
- Mark Waugh named as Wisden Cricketer of the Year.

1990

- Dean Jones scores a century in both innings vs Pakistan at Adelaide.
- Australian cricket team in New Zealand in 1989–90, the 1-Test series is won by New Zealand 1–0.
- English cricket team in Australia in 1990–91, the 5-Test series is won by Australia 3–0.
- Dean Jones and Mark Taylor named as Wisden Cricketers of the Year.

=== 1980s ===
1989

- Australian cricket team in England in 1989, the 6-Test series is won by Australia 4–0.
- New Zealand cricket team in Australia in 1989–90, the 1-Test series is drawn 0–0.
- Sri Lankan cricket team in Australia in 1989–90, the 2-Test series is won by Australia 1–0.
- Australia plays its first Test at Bellerive Oval in Hobart.
- Pakistani cricket team in Australia in 1989–90, the 3-Test series is won by Australia 1–0.
- Steve Waugh named as Wisden Cricketer of the Year.

1988

- English cricket team in Australia in 1987–88, the 1-Test series, to celebrate Australia's Bicentennial, is drawn.
- Australian cricket team in Pakistan in 1988–89, the 3-Test series is won by Pakistan 1–0.
- West Indian cricket team in Australia in 1988–89, the 5-Test series is won by the West Indies 3–1.
- Merv Hughes takes a hat-trick vs West Indies at Perth.

1987

- Peter Taylor 6/78 on debut vs England at Sydney.
- Sri Lankan cricket team in Australia in 1987–88, the 1-Test series is won by Australia 1–0.
- New Zealand cricket team in Australia in 1987–88, the 3-Test series is won by Australia 1–0.
- Tony Dodemaide 6/58 on debut vs New Zealand at Melbourne.

1986

- Australian cricket team in New Zealand in 1985–86, the 3-Test series is won by New Zealand 1–0.
- Allan Border scores a century in both innings vs New Zealand at Christchurch.
- Australian cricket team in India in 1986–87, the 3-Test series is drawn 0–0.
- Australia ties Test vs India at Madras.
- English cricket team in Australia in 1986–87, the 5-Test series is won by England 2–1.
- Craig McDermott named as Wisden Cricketer of the Year.

1985

- Australian cricket team in England in 1985, the 6-Test series is won by England 3–1.
- New Zealand cricket team in Australia in 1985–86, the 3-Test series is won by New Zealand 2–1.
- Indian cricket team in Australia in 1985–86, the 3-Test series is drawn 0–0.

1984

- Australian cricket team in the West Indies in 1983–84, the 5-Test series is won by West Indies 3–0.
- West Indian cricket team in Australia in 1984–85, the 5-Test series is won by Australia 3–1.

1983

- Australian cricket team in Sri Lanka in 1982–83, the 1-Test series is won by Australia 1–0.
- Tom Hogan 5/66 on debut vs Sri Lanka at Kandy.
- Pakistani cricket team in Australia in 1983–84, the 5-Test series is won by Australia 2–0.
- Wayne Phillips 159 on debut vs Pakistan at Perth.

1982

- Australian cricket team in New Zealand in 1981–82, the 3-Test series is drawn 1–1.
- Australian cricket team in Pakistan in 1982–83, the 3-Test series is won by Pakistan 3–0.
- English cricket team in Australia in 1982–83, the 5-Test series is won by Australia 2–1.
- Kepler Wessels 162 on debut vs England at Brisbane.
- England defeats Australia by 3 runs at Melbourne.
- Terry Alderman, Allan Border and Rod Marsh named as Wisden Cricketers of the Year.

1981

- Australian cricket team in England in 1981, the 5-Test series is won by England 3–1.
- Terry Alderman 5/62 on debut vs England at Trent Bridge.
- England defeats Australia by 18 runs after following-on.
- Mike Whitney scores a pair on debut vs England at Old Trafford.
- Dirk Wellham 103 on debut vs England at The Oval.
- West Indian cricket team in Australia in 1981–82, the 3-Test series is drawn 1–1.
- Kim Hughes named as Wisden Cricketer of the Year.

1980

- West Indies defeats Australia by 408 runs at Adelaide.
- Australian cricket team in Pakistan in 1979–80, the 3-Test series is won by Pakistan 1–0.
- Allan Border scores a century in both innings vs Pakistan at Lahore.
- Australian cricket team in England in 1980, the 1-Test series is drawn 0–0; this was the Centenary Test to mark 100 years of Test cricket in England.
- New Zealand cricket team in Australia in 1980–81, the 3-Test series is won by Australia 2–0.
- Indian cricket team in Australia in 1980–81, the 3-Test series is drawn 1–1.

=== 1970s ===
1979

- Pakistani cricket team in Australia in 1978–79, the 2-Test series is drawn 1–1.
- Australian cricket team in India in 1979–80, the 6-Test series is won by India 2–0.
- West Indian cricket team in Australia in 1979–80, the 3-Test series is won by West Indies 2–0.
- English cricket team in Australia in 1979–80, the 3-Test series is won by Australia 3–0.

1978

- Australian cricket team in the West Indies in 1977–78, the 5-Test series is won by West Indies 3–1.
- English cricket team in Australia in 1978–79, the 6-Test series is won by England 5–1.
- Rodney Hogg 6/74 on debut vs England at Brisbane.

1977

- Australian cricket team in New Zealand in 1976–77, the 2-Test series is won by Australia 1–0.
- Centenary Test Australia vs England at Melbourne.
- Australian cricket team in England in 1977, the 5-Test series is won by England 3–0.
- Mick Malone 5/63 on debut vs England at The Oval.
- Indian cricket team in Australia in 1977–78, the 5-Test series is won by Australia 3–2.
- Australia defeats India by 16 runs at Brisbane.
- Australia defeats India by 2 wickets at Perth.
- Death of Jack Ryder.

1976

- Pakistani cricket team in Australia in 1976–77, the 3-Test series is drawn 1–1.
- Ian Chappell and Rick McCosker named as Wisden Cricketers of the Year.

1975

- Australian cricket team in England in 1975, the 4-Test series is won by Australia 1–0.
- West Indian cricket team in Australia in 1975–76, the 6-Test series is won by Australia 5–1.
- Greg Chappell scores centuries in both innings vs West Indies at Brisbane.
- Gary Cosier 109 on debut vs West Indies at Melbourne.

1974

- Geoff Dymock 5/58 on debut vs New Zealand at Adelaide.
- Australian cricket team in New Zealand in 1973–74, the 3-Test series is drawn 1–1.
- Greg Chappell and Ian Chappell both score centuries in both innings vs New Zealand in Wellington.
- English cricket team in Australia in 1974–75, the 6-Test series is won by Australia 4–1.

1973

- Australian cricket team in the West Indies in 1972–73, the 5-Test series is won by Australia 2–0.
- New Zealand cricket team in Australia in 1973–74, the 3-Test series is won by Australia 2–0.
- Greg Chappell, Dennis Lillee, Bob Massie and Keith Stackpole named as Wisden Cricketers of the Year.

1972

- Australian cricket team in England in 1972, the 5-Test series is won by England 2–1.
- Bob Massie 8/84 and 8/53 on debut vs England at Lord's.
- Pakistani cricket team in Australia in 1972–73, the 3-Test series is won by Australia 3–0.

1971

- Dennis Lillee 5/84 on debut vs England at Adelaide.
- After South Africa is banned from international cricket and its 1971–72 tour of Australia is cancelled, a Rest of the World team tours Australia but these are not recognised as Test matches.

1970

- Australian cricket team in South Africa in 1969–70, the 4-Test series is won by South Africa 4–0.
- English cricket team in Australia in 1970–71, the 6-Test series is won by England 1–0.
- Australia plays its first Test at the WACA Ground in Perth.
- Greg Chappell 108 on debut vs England at Perth.

=== 1960s ===
1969

- Doug Walters scores a double-century and a century vs West Indies at Sydney, the first Test batsman to do so.
- Australian cricket team in India in 1969–70, the 5-Test series is won by Australia 3–1.
- Death of Vic Richardson.

1968

- Australian cricket team in England in 1968, the 5-Test series is drawn 1–1.
- West Indian cricket team in Australia in 1968–69, the 5-Test series is won by Australia 3–1.

1967

- Indian cricket team in Australia in 1967–68, the 4-Test series is won by Australia 4–0.

1966

- Bob Cowper 307 vs England at Melbourne.
- Australian cricket team in South Africa in 1966-67, the 5-Test series is won by South Africa 3–1.

1965

- Australian cricket team in the West Indies in 1964–65, the 5-Test series is won by West Indies 2–1.
- English cricket team in Australia in 1965–66, the 5-Test series is drawn 1–1.
- Doug Walters 155 on debut vs England at Brisbane.
- Peter Burge, Graham McKenzie and Bob Simpson named as Wisden Cricketers of the Year.
- Death of Bill Woodfull.

1964

- Australian cricket team in England in 1964, the 5-Test series is won by Australia 1–0.
- Bob Simpson 311 vs England at Old Trafford.
- Australian cricket team in India in 1964–65, the 3-Test series is drawn 1–1.
- Australian cricket team in Pakistan in 1964–65, the 1-Test series is drawn 1–0.
- Bob Simpson scores a century in both innings vs Pakistan at Karachi.
- Pakistani cricket team in Australia in 1964–65, the 1-Test series is drawn 0–0.

1963

- South African cricket team in Australia in 1963–64, the 5-Test series is drawn 1–1.

1962

- English cricket team in Australia in 1962–63, the 5-Test series is drawn 1–1.
- Bill Alley, Richie Benaud, Alan Davidson, Bill Lawry and Norm O'Neill named as Wisden Cricketers of the Year.

1961

- Australia defeats West Indies by 2 wickets at Melbourne.
- Australian cricket team in England in 1961, the 5-Test series is won by Australia 2–1.
- Graham McKenzie 5/37 on debut vs England at Lord's.

1960

- West Indian cricket team in Australia in 1960–61, the 5-Test series is won by Australia 2–1.
- Australia ties Test vs West Indies at Brisbane.

=== 1950s ===
1959

- Australian cricket team in India in 1959–60, the 5-Test series is won by Australia 2–1.
- Australian cricket team in Pakistan in 1959–60, the 3-Test series is won by Australia 2–0.
- Death of Herbie Collins.

1958

- Lindsay Kline takes a hat-trick vs South Africa at Cape Town.
- English cricket team in Australia in 1958–59, the 5-Test series is won by Australia 4–0.

1957

- Australian cricket team in South Africa in 1957–58, the 5-Test series is won by Australia 3–0.
- Ian Meckiff 5/125 on debut vs South Africa at Johannesburg.
- Gil Langley named as Wisden Cricketer of the Year.

1956

- Australian cricket team in England in 1956, the 5-Test series is won by England 2–1.
- Australian cricket team in India in 1956–57, the 3-Test series is won by Australia 2–0.
- Australian cricket team in Pakistan in 1956–57, the 1-Test series is won by Pakistan 1–0.

1955

- Australian cricket team in the West Indies in 1954–55, the 5-Test series is won by Australia 3–0.
- Australia 758-8d vs West Indies at Kingston.

1954

- English cricket team in Australia in 1954–55, the 5-Test series is won by England 3–1.
- Neil Harvey and Keith Miller named as Wisden Cricketers of the Year.
- Death of Warren Bardsley.

1953

- Australian cricket team in England in 1953, the 5-Test series is won by England 1–0.

1952

- South African cricket team in Australia in 1952–53, the 5-Test series is drawn 2–2.

1951

- Jim Burke 101* on debut vs England at Adelaide.
- West Indian cricket team in Australia in 1951–52, the 5-Test series is won by Australia 4–1.
- Australia defeats West Indies by 1 wicket at Melbourne.

1950

- Jack Moroney scores a century in both innings vs South Africa at Old Wanderers.
- Australia defeats South Africa by an innings and 259 runs at Port Elizabeth.
- English cricket team in Australia in 1950–51, the 5-Test series is won by Australia 4–1.

=== 1940s ===
1949

- Australian cricket team in South Africa in 1949–50, the 5-Test series is won by Australia 4–0.
- Lindsay Hassett, Bill Johnston, Ray Lindwall, Arthur Morris and Don Tallon named as Wisden Cricketers of the Year.

1948

- Don Bradman scores a century in both innings vs India at Melbourne.
- Australian cricket team in England in 1948, the 5-Test series is won by Australia 4–0.
- Australia defeats England by 409 runs at Lord's.

1947

- Arthur Morris scores a century in both innings vs England at Adelaide.
- Indian cricket team in Australia in 1947–48, the 5-Test series is won by Australia 4–0.
- Australia defeats India by an innings and 226 runs at Brisbane.
- Death of Warwick Armstrong.

1946

- English cricket team in Australia in 1946–47, the 5-Test series is won by Australia 3–0.
- Australia defeats England by an innings and 332 runs at Brisbane.
- Sid Barnes & Don Bradman 405 for 5th wicket vs England at Sydney.
- Death of Joe Darling.

1945

- No Test cricket played due to World War II.
- Death of Clem Hill.

1944

- No Test cricket played due to World War II.

1943

- No Test cricket played due to World War II.

1942

- No Test cricket played due to World War II.

1941

- No Test cricket played due to World War II.

1940

- No Test cricket played due to World War II.
- Death of Monty Noble.

=== 1930s ===
1939

- Bill Brown named as Wisden Cricketer of the Year.

1938

- Australian cricket team in England in 1938, the 5-Test series is drawn 1–1.
- England defeats Australia by an innings and 579 runs at The Oval.
- Death of Hugh Massie.
- Death of Hugh Trumble.

1937

1936

- English cricket team in Australia in 1936–37, the 5-Test series is won by Australia 3–2.
- Frank Ward 5/66 on debut vs England at Brisbane.

1935

- Stan McCabe, Bill O'Reilly and Bill Ponsford named as Wisden Cricketers of the Year.

1934

- Australian cricket team in England in 1934, the 5-Test series is won by Australia 2–1.
- Don Bradman 304 vs England at Headingley.
- Bill Ponsford & Don Bradman 388 for 4th wicket vs England at Headingley.
- Australia 701 vs England at The Oval.
- Australia defeats England by 562 runs at The Oval.
- Bill Ponsford & Don Bradman 451 for 2nd wicket vs England at The Oval.

1933

- England defeats Australia by 338 runs at Adelaide in what comes to be known as the defining moment of the 1932–33 Bodyline series.

1932

- English cricket team in Australia in 1932–33, the 5-Test series is won by England 4–1.
- Death of Jack Blackham.

1931

- Australia plays its last Test at Exhibition Ground in Brisbane.
- South African cricket team in Australia in 1931–32, the 5-Test series is won by Australia 5–0.
- Australia plays its first Test at the Gabba in Brisbane.
- Don Bradman and Clarrie Grimmett named as Wisden Cricketers of the Year.

1930

- Australian cricket team in England in 1930, the 5-Test series is won by Australia 2–1.
- Australia 729-6d vs England at Lord's.
- Don Bradman 334 vs England at Headingley.
- Australia 695 vs England at The Oval.
- West Indian cricket team in Australia in 1930–31, the 5-Test series is won by Australia 4–1.

=== 1920s ===
1929

- Archie Jackson 129 on debut vs England at Adelaide.
- Tim Wall 5/66 on debut vs England at Melbourne.
- Death of Syd Gregory.

1928

- English cricket team in Australia in 1928–29, the 5-Test series is won by England 4–1.
- Australia plays its first Test at Exhibition Ground in Brisbane.
- England defeat Australia by 675 runs at Brisbane.

1927

- Bert Oldfield and Bill Woodfull named as Wisden Cricketers of the Year.
- Death of George Giffen.

1926

- Australian cricket team in England in 1926, the 5-Test series is won by England 1–0.

1925

- Australia defeats England by 11 runs at Adelaide.
- Clarrie Grimmett 5/45 and 6/37 on debut vs England at Sydney.

1924

- English cricket team in Australia in 1924–25, the 5-Test series is won by Australia 4–1.
- Bill Ponsford 110 on debut vs England at Sydney.

1923

- No Test cricket played by Australia during the year.

1922

- Jack Gregory, Charlie Macartney and Ted McDonald named as Wisden Cricketers of the Year.

1921

- Arthur Mailey 9/121 vs England at Melbourne. (Note: Current best Australian Test bowling figures)
- Australian cricket team in England in 1921, the 5-Test series is won by Australia 3–0.

1920

- English cricket team in Australia in 1920–21, the 5-Test series is won by Australia 5–0.
- Herbie Collins 104 on debut vs England at Sydney.

=== 1910s ===
1919

- Death of Dave Gregory.

1918

- No Test cricket played due to World War I.

1917

- No Test cricket played due to World War I.
- Death of Harry Trott.

1916

- No Test cricket played due to World War I.
- Death of Tom Horan.

1915

- No Test cricket played due to World War I.

1914

- No Test cricket played due to World War I.

1913

- No Test cricket played by Australia during the year.

1912

- England defeats Australia by an innings and 225 runs at Melbourne.
- Australian cricket team in England in 1912, this is the first and only triangular series. The 9-Test series is won by England 4–0, with Australia 2–1, and South Africa 0–5.
- Jimmy Matthews takes a hat-trick in each innings vs South Africa at Manchester.

1911

- Victor Trumper 214* vs South Africa at Adelaide.
- Ranji Hordern 5/66 on debut vs South Africa at Melbourne.
- Australia defeats South Africa by 530 runs at Melbourne.
- English cricket team in Australia in 1911–12, the 5-Test series is won by England 4–1.
- Death of Billy Murdoch.

1910

- South African cricket team in Australia in 1910–11, the 5-Test series is won by Australia 4–1.
- Warren Bardsley named as Wisden Cricketer of the Year.
- Death of Tup Scott.

=== 1900s ===
1909

- Australian cricket team in England in 1909, the 5-Test series is won by Australia 2–1.
- Frank Laver 8/31 vs England at Old Trafford. (Note: Then Australia's best Test bowling figures)
- Warren Bardsley scores centuries in both innings vs England at The Oval.
- Alan Marshal named as Wisden Cricketer of the Year.

1908

- England defeats Australia by 1 wicket at Melbourne.
- Roger Hartigan 116 on debut vs England at Adelaide.
- Jack O'Connor 5/65 on debut vs England at Adelaide.

1907

- English cricket team in Australia in 1907–08, the 5-Test series is won by Australia 4–1.
- Australia defeats England by 2 wickets at Sydney.

1906

- No Test cricket is played by Australia during this year.

1905

- Australian cricket team in England in 1905, the 5-Test series is won by England 2–0.

1904

- Hugh Trumble takes a hat-trick vs England at Melbourne.

1903

- English cricket team in Australia in 1903–04, the 5-Test series is won by England 3–2.
- Warwick Armstrong, Jim Kelly and Victor Trumper named as Wisden Cricketers of the Year.

1902

- Reggie Duff 104 on debut vs England at Melbourne.
- Hugh Trumble takes a hat-trick vs England at Melbourne.
- Jack Saunders 5/43 on debut vs England at Sydney.
- Australian cricket team in England in 1902, the 5-Test series is won by Australia 2–1.
- Australia 36 vs England at Edgbaston.
- Australia defeats England by 3 runs at Old Trafford.
- England defeats Australia by 1 wicket at The Oval.
- Australian cricket team in South Africa in 1902–03, the 3-Test series is won by Australia 2–0.

1901

- English cricket team in Australia in 1901–02, the 5-Test series is won by Australia 4–1.

1900

- Joe Darling, Clem Hill and Monty Noble named as Wisden Cricketers of the Year.

== 19th century ==
=== 1890s ===
1899

- Australian cricket team in England in 1899, the 5-Test series is won by Australia 1–0.

1898

- Monty Noble 6–49 on debut vs England at Adelaide.

1897

- English cricket team in Australia in 1897–98, the 5-Test series is won by Australia 4–1.
- Syd Gregory and Hugh Trumble named as Wisden Cricketers of the Year.

1896

- Australian cricket team in England in 1896, the 3-Test series is won by England 2–1.
- Australia 53 vs England at Lord's.
- Australia 44 vs England at The Oval.
- Death of Percy McDonnell.

1895

- Albert Trott 8–43 on debut vs England at Adelaide.

1894

- English cricket team in Australia in 1894–95, the 5-Test series is won by England 3–2.
- England defeats Australia by 10 runs after following-on at Sydney.
- Arthur Coningham dismisses English batsman Archie MacLaren with his first ball in Test cricket at Sydney.
- George Giffen and Harry Trott named as Wisden Cricketers of the Year.

1893

- Australian cricket team in England in 1893, the 3-Test series is won by England 1–0.
- Harry Graham 107 on debut vs England at Lord's.

1892

- Bob McLeod 5–53 on debut vs England at Melbourne.
- England defeats Australia by an innings and 230 runs at Adelaide.

1891

- English cricket team in Australia in 1891–92, the 3-Test series is won by Australia 2–1.

1890

- Australian cricket team in England in 1890, the 3-Test series is won by England 2–0.

=== 1880s ===
1889

- No Test cricket is played by Australia during this year.

1888

- Australia 42 vs England at Sydney.
- Australian cricket team in England in 1888, the 3-Test series is won by England 2–1.

1887

- English cricket teams in Australia in 1887–88, the 1-Test series is won by England 1–0.
- Charlie Turner 5–76 on debut vs England at Sydney.
- J.J. Ferris 6–15 on debut vs England at Sydney.

1886

- Australian cricket team in England in 1886, the 3-Test series is won by England 3–0.
- England defeats Australia by an innings and 217 runs at The Oval.
- English cricket team in Australia in 1886–87, the 2-Test series is won by England 2–0.

1885

- Australia defeats England by 6 runs at Sydney.

1884

- Australian cricket team in England in 1884, the 3-Test series is won by England 1–0.
- Billy Murdoch 211 vs England at The Oval. (Note: First double-century in Test cricket)
- English cricket team in Australia in 1884–85, the 5-Test series is won by England 3–2.
- Australia plays its first Test at Adelaide.

1883

- Tom Horan dismisses English batsman Walter Read with his first ball in Test cricket at Sydney.

1882

- Australian cricket team in England in 1882, the 1-Test series is won by Australia 1–0.
- Australia 63 vs England at The Oval.
- Australia defeats England by 7 runs at The Oval.
- English cricket team in Australia in 1882–83 in what becomes known as the first Ashes Series, the 4-Test series is drawn 2–2.
- Australia plays its first Test at Sydney.

1881

- English cricket team in Australia in 1881–82, the 4-Test series is won by Australia 2–0.
- William Cooper 6–120 on debut vs England at Melbourne.

1880

- Australian cricket team in England in 1880, the 1-Test series is won by England 1–0.

=== 1870s ===
1879

- Fred Spofforth takes a hat-trick vs England at Melbourne.

1878

- English cricket team in Australia in 1878–79, the 1-Test series is won by Australia 1–0.

1877

- English cricket team in Australia in 1876–77, the 2-Test series is drawn 1–1.
- First Test between Australia and England at Melbourne.
- Charles Bannerman 165* on debut vs England at Melbourne.
- Billy Midwinter 5–78 on debut vs England at Melbourne.
- Tom Kendall 7–55 on debut vs England at Melbourne.

== See also ==
- List of Test cricket records
- List of Australia Test cricket records
- List of cricketers who have scored centuries in both innings of a Test match
- Pairs in Test and first-class cricket
- List of Australia cricketers who have taken five-wicket hauls on Test debut
- List of bowlers who have taken a wicket with their first ball in international cricket
- List of Test cricket hat-tricks
- List of Test cricket grounds
