= History of the Australia national cricket team =

The History of the Australian cricket team began when eleven cricketers from the colonies of New South Wales (NSW) and Victoria formed an eleven to play a touring team of professional English cricketers at Melbourne in March 1877. Billed as the "Grand Combination match", the game is now known as the first Test match. Encouraged by a 45-run victory, the colonists believed that they had enough cricketing talent to take on the English on their own soil. A team organised and managed by John Conway, a former Victorian player, toured England during the 1878 season. After a discouraging loss to Nottinghamshire in the opening match of the tour, the Australians met a Marylebone Cricket Club (MCC) team at Lord's on 26 May 1878. Australia's upset win by nine wickets was "the commencement of the modern era of cricket", according to Lord Hawke.

== The 1860s ==
In 1865, a match was arranged between a team of Aboriginal cricketers and European settlers from various pastoral stations; the indigenous team won. The playing of cricket by indigenous people of the Western District reflected their changing circumstances. At this time there were no formal associations.

== The 1870s ==
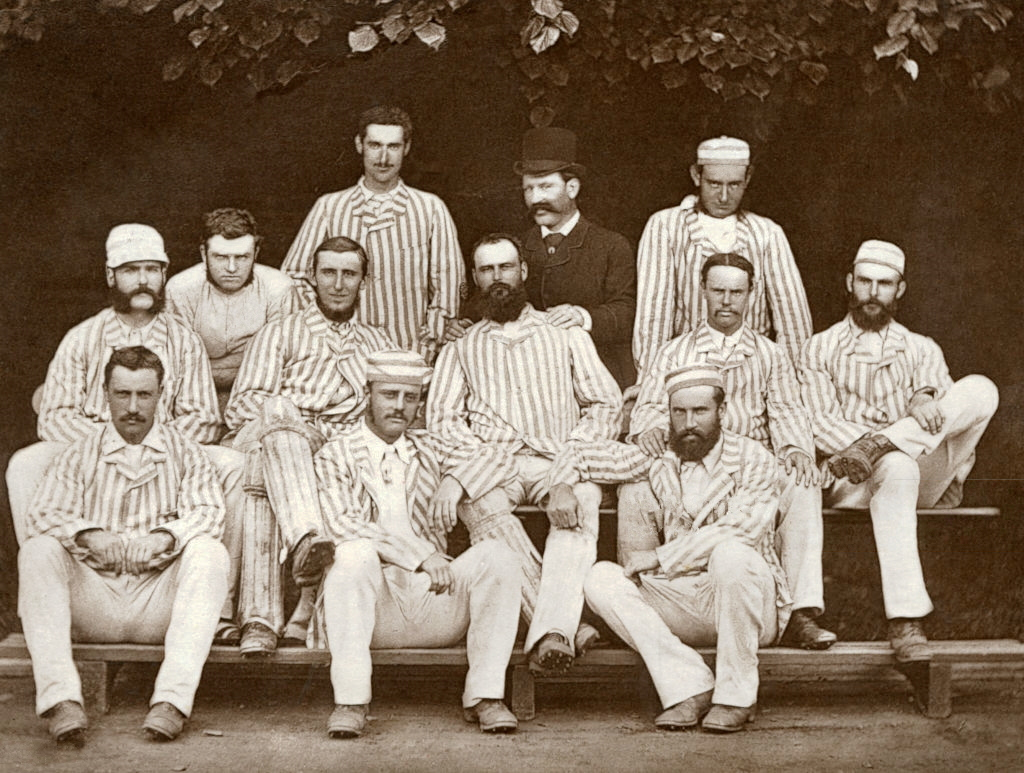
1878 team

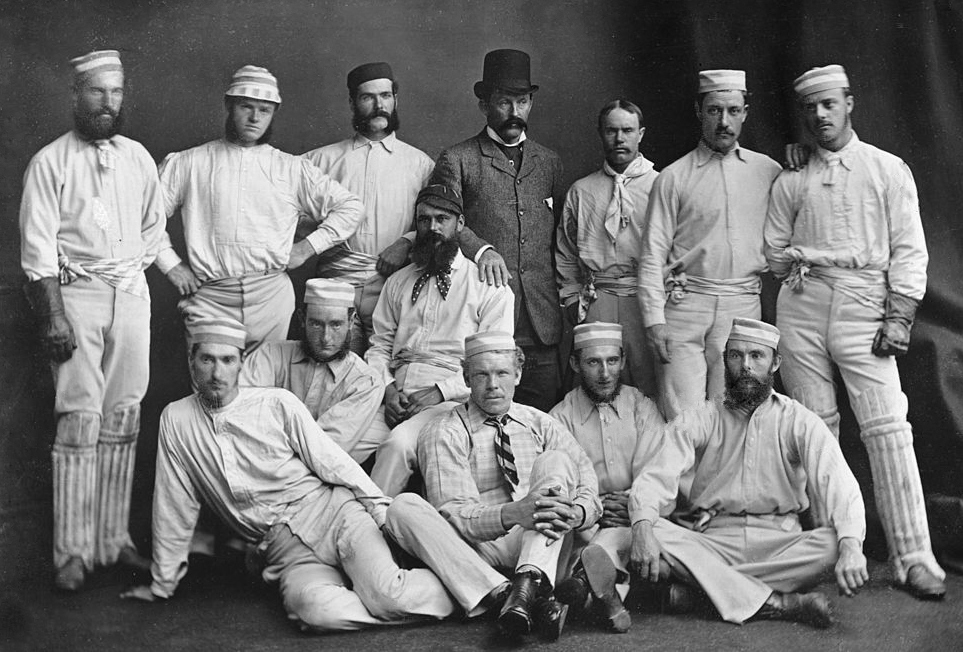
1878 team

Season	Opponent	Venue	Played	Won	Lost	Drawn
1876–77	England	Australia	2	1	1	0
1878–79	England	Australia	1	1	0	0
Totals			3	2	1	0

The 1870s saw the first official matches between English and Australian teams. Due to the amount of time that it took teams to travel from England to Australia (and vice versa), these teams were generally not a true representation of the best players for each country. At the time, there was no significance placed on these matches – statisticians later called them "test matches" between England and Australia.

James Lillywhite's English side toured Australia in between January and April 1877 and played the first two test matches after a drawn match against a New South Wales side.

England in Australia 1876/77. Match length: Timeless. Balls per over: 4. Series result: Drawn 1–1.

No.	Date	Home captain	Away captain	Venue	Result
1	15,16,17,19 Mar 1877	Dave Gregory (AUS)	James Lillywhite (ENG)	Melbourne Cricket Ground (AUS)	AUS by 45 runs
2	31 Mar,2,3,4 Apr 1877	Dave Gregory (AUS)	James Lillywhite (ENG)	Melbourne Cricket Ground (AUS)	ENG by 4 wkts

Just over a year later, an Australian side visited England and played a match against the MCC. In what turned out to be a match that was completed in one day, only 105 runs were scored with the Australian side emerging the victors by nine wickets. This match however was not granted test status.

In 1879, Lord Harris led an English side down under between January and March. This tour schedule involved a single test match followed by two series of two matches against Victorian and New South Wales sides.

England in Australia 1878/79. Match length: Timeless. Balls per over: 4. Series result: Australia, 1–0.

No.	Date	Home captain	Away captain	Venue	Result
3	2,3,4 Jan 1879	Dave Gregory (AUS)	Lord Harris (ENG)	Melbourne Cricket Ground (AUS)	AUS by 10 wkts

== The 1880s ==
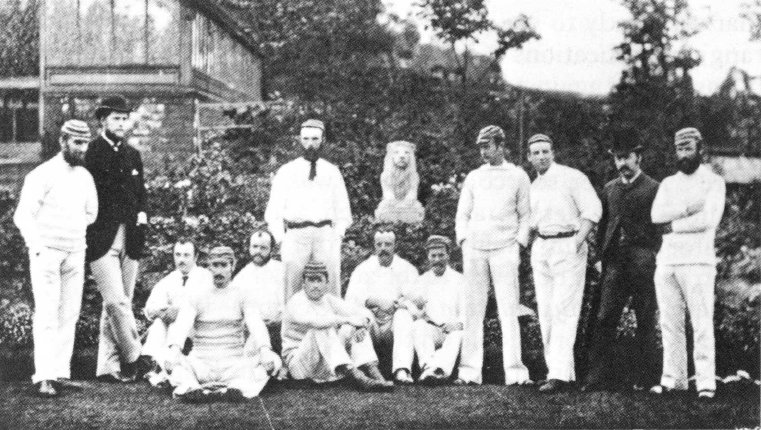
1882 team

Season	Opponent	Venue	Played	Won	Lost	Drawn
1880	England	England	1	0	1	0
1881–82	England	Australia	4	2	0	2
1882	England	England	1	1	0	0
1882–83	England	Australia	4	2	2	0
1884	England	England	3	0	1	2
1884-5	England	Australia	5	2	3	0
1886	England	England	3	0	3	0
1886–87	England	Australia	2	0	2	0
1887–88	England	Australia	1	0	1	0
1888	England	England	3	1	2	0
Totals			27	8	15	4

Australia toured England 5 times during the 1880s and played 27 Test matches. One of these matches was played in 1880, 1 in 1882 and 3 in 1884, 1886 and 1888 respectively. Losing a total of 15 matches. Note: Balls per over: 4. 16 of them were timeless matches while 11 were 3-day Test matches. During this time Percy McDonnell led the Australian scoring with 950 runs. Closely followed by Billy Murdoch on 860 and Alec Bannerman on 745. during this time Spofforth was the most prolific wicket taker with 94 wickets at an average of 18.41 runs per wicket. Palmer closely followed with 78 wickets at an average of 21.51 per wicket.

== The 1890s ==
Season	Opponent	Venue	Played	Won	Lost	Drawn	Result
1890	England	England	3	0	3	0	Lost
1891–92	England	Australia	3	2	1	0	Won
1893	England	England	3	0	1	2	Lost
1894–95	England	Australia	5	2	3	0	Lost
1896	England	England	3	1	2	0	Lost
1897–98	England	Australia	5	4	1	0	Won
1899	England	England	5	1	0	4	Won
Totals			27	10	11	6	

Australia toured England 4 times during the 1890s and played 26 Test matches against them. (won 10, lost 10)

Note: Half the Tests had 5 balls per over and half had 6 balls per over. Half of them were 3-day Test matches and half were timeless Test matches.

- 1890: 2 Tests
- 1893: 3 Tests
- 1896: 3 Tests
- 1899: First 5 Test tour

=== List of Australian Test captains in the 1890s ===
The Australian Test captains in the 1890s were Murdoch (2 Tests), Blackham (7), Giffen (4), Trott (8) and Darling (5).

=== List of top Australian Test run scorers in the 1890s ===
1. Darling 1139

=== List of top Australian Test wicket takers in the 1890s ===
1. Giffen 74
2. Trumble 63
3. Jones 56
4. Turner 51

== 1900s ==
Season	Opponent	Venue	Played	Won	Lost	Drawn	Result
1901–02	England	Australia	5	4	1	0	Won
1902	England	England	5	2	1	2	Won
1902–03	South Africa	South Africa	3	2	0	1	Won
1903–04	England	Australia	5	2	3	0	Lost
1905	England	England	5	0	2	3	Lost
1907–08	England	Australia	5	4	1	0	Won
1909	England	England	5	2	1	2	Won
Totals			33	16	9	8	

Australian team started touring other countries such as South Africa which had Test status (first tour in 1903) and New Zealand for the first time in 1905.

=== Test tours ===
Australia toured England 3 times between 1900–1909 and toured South Africa for the first time in 1903. Australia played 33 Test matches in this decade winning 16 of them and losing 9. Most of them were against England and only 3 of them were against South Africa. Test cricket had for the first time gone to Africa. All the Test matches had 6 balls per over. Most of them were 3-day Test matches while 15 of them were timeless Test matches.

- 1902: 5 Tests in England
- 1903: First tour of South Africa, 3 Tests
- 1905: 5 Tests in England
- 1909: 5 Tests in England

=== Australian Test captains ===
The two main Australian Test team captains during this period were Darling and Noble.

=== List of top Australian wicket takers of the period ===
1. Noble 89
2. Saunders 79
3. Trumble 78

== The 1910s ==
Season	Opponent	Venue	Played	Won	Lost	Drawn	Result
1910–11	South Africa	Australia	5	4	1	0	Won
1911–12	England	Australia	5	1	4	0	Lost
1912	South Africa	England	3	2	0	1	Won
1912	England	England	3	0	1	2	Lost
Totals			16	7	6	3	

Australia were visited in the first two summers of this decade by South Africa and England respectively. In 1912 the Australian team toured England and played in the 1912 Triangular Tournament with their hosts and South Africa.

Australia toured USA and Canada in June to August 1913, playing five matches, four in Philadelphia and one in Toronto.

Needless to say, this was the decade of World War I. After the last match of the Triangular series in August 1912, Australia did not play another Test match until December 1920 when England, as the Marylebone Cricket Club toured Australia in a five Test series.

== The 1920s ==
=== Test tours ===
Season	Opponent	Venue	Played	Won	Lost	Drawn	Result
1920–21	England	Australia	5	5	0	0	Won
1921	England	England	5	3	0	2	Won
1921–22	South Africa	South Africa	3	1	0	2	Won
1924–25	England	Australia	5	4	1	0	Won
1926	England	England	5	0	1	4	Lost
1928–29	England	Australia	5	1	4	0	Lost
Totals			28	14	6	8	

Australia toured England twice and South Africa once during this decade. Australia played 28 Test matches during this decade, winning 14 and losing 6. Most of them were against England and only 3 against South Africa. 5 of the Test matches had 8 ball overs. Most of the Test matches were timeless whereas there were 9 three-day Test matches and 3 four-day Test matches.

- 1921: 5 Tests in England, 3 Tests in South Africa in November
- 1926: 5 Tests in England

=== Australian Test captains ===
The two main Australian Test captains during this decade were Armstrong and Collins. Both of them had a good record.

=== List of top Australian Test run scorers of the 1920s ===
1. Ryder 1394
2. Collins 1352
3. Macartney 1252
4. Gregory 1146

=== List of top Australian wicket takers of the 1920s ===
1. Mailey 99
2. Gregory 85

== The 1930s ==
Season	Opponent	Venue	Played	Won	Lost	Drawn	Result
1930	England	England	5	2	1	2	Won
1930–31	West Indies	Australia	5	4	1	0	Won
1931–32	South Africa	Australia	5	5	0	0	Won
1932–33	England	Australia	5	1	4	0	Lost
1934	England	England	5	2	1	2	Won
1935–36	South Africa	South Africa	5	4	0	1	Won
1936–37	England	Australia	5	3	2	0	Won
1938	England	England	4	1	1	2	Drawn
Totals			39	22	10	7	

Australia toured England thrice and had the first 5 Test tour of South Africa. Australia played 39 Tests in this decade winning 22 and losing 10. Australia also toured India and Ceylon in 1935 but no official international match was played although India got Test status in 1932.

=== Test tours ===
- 1930: 5 Tests in England
- 1934: 5 Tests in England
- 1935–1936: First 5 Test tour of South Africa
- 1938: 4 Tests in England

=== Australian Test captains ===
The leading Australian Test captain in this decade was Woodfull. Don Bradman led the Australian team in 9 Test matches in this decade.

=== Australian Test batsmen ===
Don Bradman, regarded by most followers of the game as the greatest batsman to have played the game scored 4625 Test runs in this decade at an average of 102.77 runs per innings with 19 centuries.

Sir Donald eclipsed other performances which would have otherwise had been noticed such as Stan McCabe's 2748 runs at an average of 48.2 runs per innings.

=== List of top Australian wicket takers in the 1930s ===
- Grimmett 169 wickets at an average of 21.95 runs per wicket
- O'Reilly 136 wickets at an average of 23.68 runs per wicket

== The 1940s ==
=== Test tours ===
Season	Opponent	Venue	Played	Won	Lost	Drawn	Result
1945–46	New Zealand	New Zealand	1	1	0	0	Won
1946–47	England	Australia	5	3	0	2	Won
1947–48	India	Australia	5	4	0	1	Won
1948	England	England	5	4	0	1	Won
1949–50	South Africa	South Africa	5	4	0	1	Won
Totals			21	16	0	5	

This decade was affected by World War II. Due to this Australia played only 17 Test matches. Their performance was impressive perhaps due to the Don Bradman factor as they won 13 of them and did not lose a single Test match. Most of the victories were against England. Australia were led by Sir Donald Bradman during this period. He scored 1903 runs at an average of 105.72 runs per innings.

- 1946 Australia's first Test tour of New Zealand (1 Test)
- 1948 5 Test tour of England (see: The Invincibles (cricket))
- 1949–1950 5 Test tour of South Africa

=== Australian Test bowlers ===
- Ray Lindwall 70 wickets at an average of 19.17 runs per wicket.
- Johnston 54 wickets at an average of 18.51 runs per wicket.

== The 1950s ==
Season	Opponent	Venue	Played	Won	Lost	Drawn	Result
1950–51	England	Australia	5	4	1	0	Won
1951–52	West Indies	Australia	5	4	1	0	Won
1952–53	South Africa	Australia	5	2	2	1	Drawn
1953	England	England	5	0	1	4	Lost
1954–55	England	Australia	5	1	4	0	Lost
1954–55	West Indies	West Indies	5	3	0	2	Won
1956	England	England	5	1	2	2	Lost
1956–57	Pakistan	Pakistan	1	0	1	0	Lost
1956–57	India	India	3	2	0	1	Won
1957–58	South Africa	South Africa	5	3	0	2	Won
1958–59	England	Australia	5	4	1	0	Won
1959–60	Pakistan	Pakistan	3	2	0	1	Won
1959–60	India	India	5	2	1	2	Won
Totals			57	28	14	15	

England was no longer the prime opponent. Australia played 13 Test matches against South Africa and 10 against West Indies. Most of the Tests during this period were played with 8 ball overs and 5-day Test matches although Australia also played 22 six-day Test matches. Australian Test captains were Hassett, Johnson and the popular Richie Benaud who had an exceptional record during this period. Australia's leading runscorer in this decade was Harvey with 4573 runs at an average of 50.25 runs per innings while the leading wicket taker was Richie Benaud with 165 wickets at an average of 23.95.

=== Test tours ===
- 1953 5 Tests in England
- 1955 5 Test tour of West Indies
- 1956 5 Tests in England
- 1956 first tour of Pakistan, 1 Test
- 1956 first tour of India, 3 Tests
- 1958 5 Tests in South Africa
- 1959 3 Tests in Pakistan
- 1959–1960 5 Tests in India

== The 1960s ==
Season	Opponent	Venue	Played	Won	Lost	Drawn	Result
1960–61	West Indies	Australia	5	2	1	1^{a}	Won
1961	England	England	5	2	1	2	Won
1962–63	England	Australia	5	1	1	3	Drawn
1963–64	South Africa	Australia	5	1	1	3	Drawn
1964	England	England	5	1	0	4	Won
1964–65	India	India	3	1	1	1	Drawn
1964–65	Pakistan	Pakistan	1	0	0	1	Drawn
1964–65	Pakistan	Australia	1	0	0	1	Drawn
1964–65	West Indies	West Indies	5	1	2	2	Lost
1965–66	England	Australia	5	1	1	3	Drawn
1966–67	South Africa	South Africa	5	1	3	1	Lost
1967–68	India	Australia	4	4	0	0	Won
1968	England	England	5	1	1	3	Drawn
1968–69	West Indies	Australia	5	3	1	1	Won
1969–70	India	India	5	3	1	1	Won
Totals			64	22	14	27^{a}	

- Includes one tied match

Richie Benaud captained Australia in 18 Test matches, Bob Simpson in 29 and Bill Lawry in 16. Lawry was the leading Test batsman. He scored 4717 Test runs at an average of 49.65 runs per innings while McKenzie was the leading Test wicket taker with 238 Test wickets.

=== Test tours ===
- 1961 5 Tests in England
- 1964 5 Tests in England
- 1964 3 Tests in India
- 1964 1 Test in Pakistan
- 1965 5 Tests in West Indies
- 1966–1967 5 Tests in South Africa
- 1968 5 Tests in England
- 1969 5 Tests in India

== The 1970s ==
Australia's Record in Test Match Cricket 1970–1979

Season	Opponent	Venue	Played	Won	Lost	Drawn	Result
1970	South Africa	South Africa	4	0	4	0	Lost
1970–71	England	Australia	7	0	2	5	Lost
1972	England	England	5	2	2	1	Drawn
1972–73	Pakistan	Australia	3	3	0	0	Won
1972–73	West Indies	West Indies	5	3	0	2	Won
1973–74	New Zealand	Australia	3	2	0	1	Won
1973–74	New Zealand	New Zealand	3	1	1	1	Drawn
1974–75	England	Australia	6	4	1	1	Won
1975	England	England	4	1	0	3	Won
1975–76	West Indies	Australia	6	5	1	0	Won
1976–77	Pakistan	Australia	3	1	1	1	Drawn
1976–77	New Zealand	New Zealand	2	1	0	1	Won
1976–77	England	Australia	1	1	0	0	Won
1977	England	England	5	0	3	2	Lost
1977–78	India	Australia	5	3	2	0	Won
1977–78	West Indies	West Indies	5	1	3	1	Lost
1978–79	England	Australia	6	1	5	0	Lost
1978–79	Pakistan	Australia	2	1	1	0	Drawn
1979–80	India	India	6	0	2	4	Lost
1979–80	West Indies	Australia	3	0	2	1	Lost
1979–80	England	Australia	3	3	0	0	Won
Totals			87	33	30	24	

Australia's Record in ODI Cricket 1970–1979

Year	Tournament	Venue	Played	Won	Lost	Tied	N/R	Result
1971	v England	Australia	1	1	0	0	0	Won
1972	Prudential Trophy	England	3	1	2	0	0	Lost
1974	v New Zealand	New Zealand	2	2	0	0	0	Won
1975	v England	Australia	1	0	1	0	0	Lost
1975	1st World Cup^{T}	England	5	4	1	0	0	Runner-up
1975	v West Indies	Australia	1	1	0	0	0	Won
1977	Prudential Trophy	England	3	1	2	0	0	Lost
1978	v West Indies	West Indies	2	1	1	0	0	Drawn
1979	v England	Australia	4	2	1	0	1	Won
1979	2nd World Cup^{T}	England	3	1	2	0	0	Eliminated
1979–80	World Series^{T}	Australia	6	2	4	0	0	Completed 1980
Totals			31	16	14	0	1	

^{T: denotes tournament played between three or more teams}

== The 1980s ==
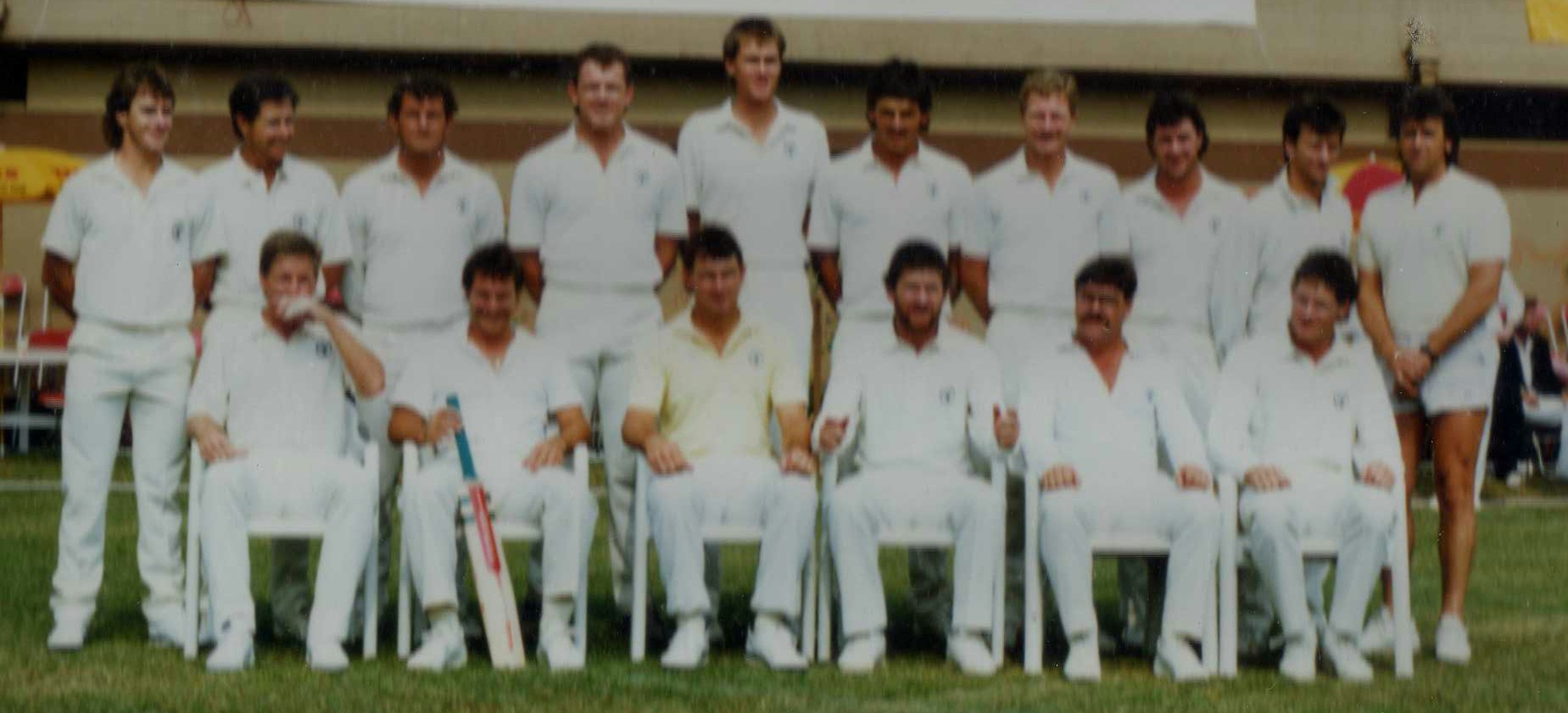
1988 team

Australia's Record in Test Match Cricket 1980–1989

Season	Opponent	Venue	Played	Won	Lost	Drawn	Result
1980	Pakistan	Pakistan	3	0	1	2	Lost
1980	England	England	1	0	0	1	Drawn
1980–81	New Zealand	Australia	3	2	0	1	Won
1980–81	India	Australia	3	1	1	1	Drawn
1981	England	England	6	1	3	2	Lost
1981–82	Pakistan	Australia	3	2	1	0	Won
1981–82	West Indies	Australia	3	1	1	1	Drawn
1981–82	New Zealand	New Zealand	3	1	1	1	Drawn
1982–83	Pakistan	Pakistan	3	0	3	0	Lost
1982–83	England	Australia	5	2	1	2	Won
1982–83	Sri Lanka	Sri Lanka	1	1	0	0	Won
1983–84	Pakistan	Australia	5	2	0	3	Won
1983–84	West Indies	West Indies	5	0	3	2	Lost
1984–85	West Indies	Australia	5	1	3	1	Lost
1985	England	England	6	1	3	2	Lost
1985–86	New Zealand	Australia	3	1	2	0	Lost
1985–86	India	Australia	3	0	0	3	Drawn
1986–87	India	India	3	0	0	2^{#}	Drawn
1986–87	England	Australia	5	1	2	2	Lost
1987–88	New Zealand	Australia	3	1	0	2	Won
1987–88	England	Australia	1	0	0	1	Drawn
1987–88	Sri Lanka	Australia	1	1	0	0	Won
1988–89	Pakistan	Pakistan	3	0	1	2	Lost
1988–89	West Indies	Australia	5	1	3	1	Lost
1989	England	England	6	4	0	2	Won
1989–90	New Zealand	Australia	1	0	0	1	Drawn
1989–90	Sri Lanka	Australia	2	1	0	1	Won
Totals			91	25	29	36^{#}	

^{# plus one tied result}

Australia's Record in ODI Cricket 1980–1989

Year	Tournament	Venue	Played	Won	Lost	Tied	N/R	Result
1979–80	World Series^{T}	Australia	2	1	1	0	0	Eliminated
1980	Prudential Trophy	England	2	0	2	0	0	Lost
1980–81	World Series^{T}	Australia	14	9	4	0	1	Won
1981	Prudential Trophy	England	3	2	1	0	0	Won
1981–82	World Series^{T}	Australia	14	5	9	0	0	Runner-up
1982	v New Zealand	New Zealand	3	2	1	0	0	Won
1982	v Pakistan	Pakistan	3	0	2	0	1	Lost
1983	World Series^{T}	Australia	12	7	5	0	0	Won
1983	v New Zealand	Australia	1	0	1	0	0	Lost
1983	v Sri Lanka	Sri Lanka	4	0	2	0	2	Lost
1983	3rd World Cup^{T}	England	6	2	4	0	0	Eliminated
1984	World Series^{T}	Australia	13	5	6	1	1	Runner-up
1984	v West Indies	West Indies	4	1	3	0	0	Lost
1984	v India	India	5	3	0	0	2	Won
1985	World Series^{T}	Australia	13	5	8	0	0	Runner-up
1985	World Champ. Cup^{T}	Australia	3	1	2	0	0	Eliminated
1985	Rothmans Cup^{T}	Sharjah	2	1	1	0	0	Runner-up
1985	Texaco Trophy	England	3	2	1	0	0	Won
1986	World Series^{T}	Australia	12	8	3	0	1	Won
1986	v New Zealand	New Zealand	4	2	2	0	0	Drawn
1986	Australasia Cup^{T}	Sharjah	1	0	1	0	0	Eliminated
1986	v India	India	6	2	3	0	1	Lost
1987	B&H Challenge^{T}	Australia	3	0	3	0	0	Eliminated
1987	World Series^{T}	Australia	10	5	5	0	0	Runner-up
1987	Sharjah Cup^{T}	Sharjah	3	0	3	0	0	Eliminated
1987	4th World Cup^{T}	India/Pakistan	8	7	1	0	0	Won
1988	World Series^{T}	Australia	10	9	1	0	0	Won
1988	v England	Australia	1	1	0	0	0	Won
1988	v Pakistan	Pakistan	1	0	1	0	0	Lost
1988–89	World Series^{T}	Australia	11	6	5	0	0	Runner-up
1989	Texaco Trophy	England	3	1	1	1	0	Lost
1989	Nehru Cup^{T}	India	5	2	3	0	0	Eliminated
1989–90	World Series^{T}	Australia	2	2	0	0	0	Completed in 1990
Totals			187	91	85	2	9	
		Home	121	64	53	1	3	
		Away	45	17	21 1	6		
		Neutral	21	10	11	0	0	

^{T: denotes tournament between three or more teams.}

Australian cricket during the 1980s was comparatively unsuccessful, particularly following the retirement of players such as Marsh and Lillee. Queenslander Allan Border, rated as one of the finest middle-order players in history, took over as captain and attempted a re-building process. For quite some time, the common wisdom was that Australia's score in an innings would be "Border plus 100". Border achieved the feat of scoring more than 150 runs in both innings of a Test during a tour of Pakistan during this decade.

As the decade continued, a number of talented players made their debuts and established themselves in the team. Among these were fast bowler Craig McDermott, wicket keeper Ian Healy, Steve Waugh and batsman Dean Jones. Cult heroes such as overweight Tasmanian batsman David Boon and Victorian bowler Merv Hughes also earned places in the team.

In the closing years of the 1980s, Australia won back the Ashes from England and began an era of dominance in that series which only ended in 2005. This decade was also notable for Australia's first Cricket World Cup victory, achieved in 1987 when they won against England by 7 runs in the most closely fought World Cup final to date at Eden Gardens in Calcutta. These two aforementioned victories are considered to have signalled the genesis of the team's rise to dominance, though at that point they were still behind the West Indies and failed to win any Tests in India or Pakistan. In 1986, Australia and India played out only the second tie in Test history, with Jones producing a famous double-century innings in sapping heat.

== The 1990s ==
Australia's Record in Test Match Cricket 1990–1999

Season	Opponent	Venue	Played	Won	Lost	Drawn	Result
1989–90	Pakistan	Australia	3	1	0	2	Won
1989–90	New Zealand	New Zealand	1	0	1	0	Lost
1990–91	England	Australia	5	3	0	2	Won
1990–91	West Indies	West Indies	5	1	3	1	Lost
1991–92	India	Australia	5	4	0	1	Won
1991–92	Sri Lanka	Sri Lanka	3	1	0	2	Won
1992–93	West Indies	Australia	5	1	2	2	Lost
1992–93	New Zealand	New Zealand	3	1	1	1	Drawn
1993	England	England	6	4	1	1	Won
1993–94	New Zealand	Australia	3	2	0	1	Won
1993–94	South Africa	Australia	3	1	1	1	Drawn
1993–94	South Africa	South Africa	3	1	1	1	Drawn
1994–95	Pakistan	Pakistan	3	0	1	2	Lost
1994–95	England	Australia	5	3	1	1	Won
1994–95	West Indies	West Indies	4	2	1	1	Won
1995–96	Pakistan	Australia	3	2	1	0	Won
1995–96	Sri Lanka	Australia	3	3	0	0	Won
1996–97	India	India	1	0	1	0	Lost
1996–97	West Indies	Australia	5	3	2	0	Won
1996–97	South Africa	South Africa	3	2	1	0	Won
1997	England	England	6	3	2	1	Won
1997–98	New Zealand	Australia	3	2	0	1	Won
1997–98	South Africa	Australia	3	1	0	2	Won
1997–98	India	India	3	1	2	0	Lost
1998–99	Pakistan	Pakistan	3	1	0	2	Won
1998–99	England	Australia	5	3	1	1	Won
1998–99	West Indies	West Indies	4	2	2	0	Drawn
1999-00	Sri Lanka	Sri Lanka	3	0	1	2	Lost
1999–00	Zimbabwe	Zimbabwe	1	1	0	0	Won
1999–00	Pakistan	Australia	3	3	0	0	Won
1999–00	India	Australia	2	2	0	0	Completed 2000
Totals			109	55	26	28	

Australia's Record in ODI Cricket 1990–1999

Year	Tournament	Venue	Played	Won	Lost	Tied	N/R	Result
1989–90	World Series	Australia	8	6	2	0	0	Won
1990	Rothmans Cup	New Zealand	5	5	0	0	0	Won
1990	Austral-Asia Cup	Sharjah	4	3	1	0	0	Runner-up
1990–91	World Series	Australia	10	9	1	0	0	Won
1991	v West Indies	West Indies	5	4	1	0	0	Won
1991–92	World Series	Australia	10	7	2	0	1	Won
1992	5th World Cup	Aust/NZ	8	4	4	0	0	Eliminated
1992	v Sri Lanka	Sri Lanka	3	1	2	0	0	Lost
1992–93	World Series	Australia	10	5	4	1	0	Runner-up
1993	v New Zealand	New Zealand	5	3	2	0	0	Won
1993	Texaco Trophy	England	3	3	0	0	0	Won
1993–94	World Series	Australia	11	7	4	0	0	Won
1994	v South Africa	South Africa	8	4	4	0	0	Drawn
1994	Austral-Asia Cup	Sharjah	3	2	1	0	0	Semi-final
1994	Singer World Series	Sri Lanka	3	1	2	0	0	Eliminated
1994	Wills Triangular Series	Pakistan	6	5	1	0	0	Won
1994–95	World Series	Australia	4	3	1	0	0	Won
1995	NZ Centenary T’ment	New Zealand	4	3	1	0	0	Won
1995	v West Indies	West Indies	5	1	4	0	0	Lost
1995–96	World Series	Australia	10	7	3	0	0	Won
1996	6th World Cup	Ind/Pak/SL	7	5	2	0	0	Runner-up
1996	Singer World Series	Sri Lanka	4	2	2	0	0	Runner-up
1996	Titan Cup	India	5	0	5	0	0	Eliminated
1996–97	CUB Series	Australia	8	3	5	0	0	Eliminated
1997	v South Africa	South Africa	7	4	3	0	0	Won
1997	Texaco Trophy	England	3	0	3	0	0	Lost
1997–98	CUB Series	Australia	11	5	6	0	0	Won
1998	v New Zealand	Australia	4	2	2	0	0	Drawn
1998	Pepsi Triangular Series	India	5	3	2	0	0	Won
1998	Coca-Cola Cup	Sharjah	5	4	1	0	0	Runner-up
1998	Wills Cup	Bangladesh	1	0	1	0	0	Eliminated
1998	v Pakistan	Pakistan	3	3	0	0	0	Won
1999	CUB Series	Australia	12	9	3	0	0	Won
1999	v West Indies	West Indies	7	3	3	1	0	Drawn
1999	7th World Cup	UK/Ire/Neth	10	7	2	1	0	Won
1999	Aiwa Cup	Sri Lanka	5	4	1	0	0	Runner-up
1999	v Zimbabwe	Zimbabwe	3	3	0	0	0	Won
Totals			225	140	81	3	1	

The 1990s saw the dawn and twilight of many well-known Australian cricketers Shane Warne became a household name during the 1993 Ashes tour, Allan Border retired after playing South Africa at Durban in 1994, Glenn McGrath became famous as a metronome (and as a rabbit) during the 1994–95 tour of the West Indies, Ricky Ponting came onto the scene with 96 against Sri Lanka during 1995–96, Craig McDermott was forced to retire during the 1996–97 season, while Brett Lee appeared at the turn of the century. Meanwhile, Australian cricket was run by three captains, Allan Border, Mark Taylor and Steve Waugh.

Australia continued to assert their dominance over The Ashes during the 1990s, won the unofficial Test 'world championship' prize from West Indies during 1994–95, won a second World Cup in 1999 and began a long winning streak in 1999, both in one-day internationals and Tests. The only venues where Australia struggled were India and Sri Lanka. The 1992–93 Frank Worrell Trophy series against the West Indies was the last Test series Australia lost at home until the 2008–09 series loss to South Africa.

A year after losing to Sri Lanka in the final of the 1996 World Cup, Australia adopted a policy of fielding separate Test and one-day sides. The policy was intended to ensure that players were only chosen for the side for which they were suitable. This resulted in the immediate removal of captain Taylor and his deputy Ian Healy from the ODI team. The move proved successful, and was also adopted by other teams such as England and the West Indies.

The defeat of the then-dominant West Indies on their 1995 tour of the Caribbean is viewed as the moment when Australia became the dominant side in the world. Since then, in spite of a few occasions (specifically the 2005 Ashes series) the Australians have had an extremely high winning rate that compares favourably to the leading teams in history (much like the West Indies for the two decades prior).

During the period from October 1999 till November 2007, The Aussies played 93 tests and Won 72 out of those. During the period they featured in 28 test series, winning in 24 of them and losing only twice.

- The 1994–95 World Series Cup was expanded to include an Australia A side, and by making the finals, it proved that Australia had a lot of young cricketers ready to represent their country (and many of them did)
- Mark Taylor's captaincy, following the retirement of Allan Border

== The 2000s ==
Australia's Record in Test Match Cricket 2000–2009

Season	Opponent	Venue	Played	Won	Lost	Drawn	Result
1999-00	India	Australia	1	1	0	0	Won
1999–90	New Zealand	New Zealand	3	3	0	0	Won
2000–01	West Indies	Australia	5	5	0	0	Won
2000–01	India	India	3	1	2	0	Lost
2001	England	England	5	4	0	1	Won
2001–02	New Zealand	New Zealand	3	0	0	3	Drawn
2001–02	South Africa	Australia	3	3	0	0	Won
2001–02	South Africa	South Africa	3	2	1	0	Won
2002–03	Pakistan	SL/UAE	3	3	0	0	Won
2002–03	England	Australia	5	4	1	0	Won
2002–03	West Indies	West Indies	4	3	1	0	Won
2003	Bangladesh	Australia	2	2	0	0	Won
2003–04	Zimbabwe	Australia	2	2	0	0	Won
2003–04	India	Australia	4	1	1	2	Drawn
2003–04	Sri Lanka	Sri Lanka	3	3	0	0	Won
2004	Sri Lanka	Australia	2	1	0	1	Won
2004–05	India	India	4	2	1	1	Won
2004–05	New Zealand	Australia	2	2	0	0	Won
2004–05	Pakistan	Australia	3	3	0	0	Won
2004–05	New Zealand	New Zealand	3	2	0	1	Won
2005	England	England	5	1	2	2	Lost
2005–06	ICC World XI	Australia	1	1	0	0	Won
2005–06	West Indies	Australia	3	3	0	0	Won
2005–06	South Africa	Australia	3	2	0	1	Won
2005–06	South Africa	South Africa	3	3	0	0	Won
2005–06	Bangladesh	Bangladesh	2	2	0	0	Won
2006–07	England	Australia	5	5	0	0	Won
2007–08	Sri Lanka	Australia	2	2	0	0	Won
2007–08	India	Australia	4	2	1	1	Won
2007–08	West Indies	Australia	3	2	1	0	Won
2008–09	India	India	4	0	2	2	Lost
2008–09	New Zealand	Australia	2	2	0	0	Won
2008–09	South Africa	Australia	3	1	2	0	Lost
2008–09	South Africa	South Africa	3	2	1	0	Won
2009	England	England	5	1	2	2	Lost
2009-10	West Indies	Australia	3	2	0	1	Won
Totals			114	72	18	19	

During this decade, Australia's dominance has continued to the point that they have gone months sometimes even a full calendar year without losing a single match and have racked up many records along the way. Following Steve Waugh's omission in 2002 from One Day International cricket and, in his retirement in 2004 from Test cricket, Ricky Ponting replaced him as Captain and continued the team's international dominance.

The 2005 Ashes series 2–1 loss to England was considered a disaster. The return series in 2006–07, was, however, a resounding success, with the Australians completing a 5–0 whitewash of the English, a feat not witnessed since Warwick Armstrong's side in 1920–21. The 2006–07 season also saw the retirements of Shane Warne, Glenn McGrath and Justin Langer. The Ashes were again lost 2–1 in England in 2009, this result reduced Australia to 4th in the ICC Test Rankings, their lowest ever position. Australia's dominance during this time extended to One-Day Cricket, with the Australians winning a third consecutive Cricket World Cup in 2007, following their successes in 2003 and 1999, and being undefeated in the 2003 and 2007 tournaments. Australia pulled out of their cricket tour of Pakistan because of Terrorism in Pakistan on 11 March 2008.

== The 2010s ==
Australia's Record in Test Match Cricket 2010–2019

Season	Opponent	Venue	Played	Won	Lost	Drawn	Result
2009-10	Pakistan	Australia	3	3	0	0	Won
2009-10	New Zealand	New Zealand	2	2	0	0	Won
2010	Pakistan	England	2	1	1	0	Drawn
2010-11	India	India	2	0	2	0	Lost
2010-11	England	Australia	5	1	3	1	Lost
2011	Sri Lanka	Sri Lanka	3	1	0	2	Won
2011-12	South Africa	South Africa	2	1	1	0	Drawn
2011-12	New Zealand	Australia	2	1	1	0	Drawn
2011-12	India	Australia	4	4	0	0	Won
2011-12	West Indies	West Indies	3	2	0	1	Won
2012-13	South Africa	Australia	3	0	1	2	Lost
2012-13	Sri Lanka	Australia	3	3	0	0	Won
2012-13	India	India	4	0	4	0	Lost
2013	England	England	5	0	3	2	Won
2013-14	England	Australia	5	5	0	0	Won
2013-14	South Africa	South Africa	3	2	1	0	Won
2014	Pakistan	UAE	2	0	2	0	Lost
2014	India	Australia	4	2	0	2	Won
2015	West Indies	West Indies	2	2	0	0	Won
2015	England	England	5	2	3	0	Lost
2015-16	West Indies	Australia	3	2	0	1	Won
2015-16	New Zealand	New Zealand	2	2	0	0	Won
2015-16	New Zealand	Australia	3	2	0	1	Won
2016	Sri Lanka	Sri Lanka	3	0	3	0	Lost
2016-17	South Africa	Australia	3	1	2	0	Lost
2016-17	Pakistan	Australia	3	3	0	0	Won
2016-17	India	India	4	1	2	1	Lost
2017	Bangladesh	Bangladesh	2	1	1	0	Drawn
2017-18	England	Australia	5	4	0	1	Won
2017-18	South Africa	South Africa	4	1	3	0	Lost
2018-19	Pakistan	UAE	2	0	1	1	Lost
2018-19	India	Australia	4	1	2	1	Lost
2018-19	Sri Lanka	Australia	2	2	0	0	Won
2019	England	England	5	2	2	1	Drawn

== The 2020s ==
Australia's Record in Test Match Cricket 2020–current

Season	Opponent	Venue	Played	Won	Lost	Drawn	Result
2019-20	Pakistan	Australia	2	2	0	0	Won
2019-20	New Zealand	Australia	3	3	0	0	Won
2020	Bangladesh	Bangladesh	0	0	0	0	-
2020-21	India	Australia	4	1	2	1	Lost
2021-22	England	Australia	5	4	0	1	Won
2021-22	Pakistan	Pakistan	3	1	0	2	Won
2022	Sri Lanka	Sri Lanka	2	1	1		Drawn
2022-23	West Indies	Australia	2	2	0	0	Won
2022-23	South Africa	Australia	3	2	0	1	Won
2022-23	India	India					
2022	England	England					

== Tournament history ==
=== World Cup ===
The Australian cricket team has had a rich history participating in the World Cup. At present, they have won the World Cup five times as well as three titles in a row, the only team to do so. After the 2007 tournament, their dominance of the tournament can be analysed through the winning percentage of all countries which have participated, as Australia hold a 10% higher winning rate over the next best side.

Their dominance of the tournament in 1999–2007 was such that they won 23 consecutive games. To put this into perspective, the second longest winning streak behind this is nine straight victories by the West Indies team of the 1970s.

=== ICC Champions Trophy ===
The Australian cricket team finally captured victory in the ICC Champions Trophy series after beating the West Indies in the final of the 2006 series and backed it up by winning their second straight ICC Champions Trophy by beating New Zealand in the 2009 edition in South Africa.

=== ICC knockout ===
The Australian cricket team made it as far as the quarter-finals in the ICC knockout. They have reached the quarter-finals on two different occasions.

=== Commonwealth Games ===
Despite topping their pool, Australia lost to South Africa in the gold medal play-off.

=== Austral-Asia Cup ===
Australia have entered the Austral-Asia cup three times. The best result came in 1990 in which they were runners-up.

=== Twenty20 World Cup ===
They reached the semi-final of the first Twenty20 World Cup in 2007 losing to the eventual champions India, but also lost to Pakistan and Zimbabwe in the group stages. In the 2009 World Cup they were eliminated in the qualification round after losing by six wickets to both the West Indies and Sri Lanka. In 2010 they were runners up after losing to England by seven wickets in the Final. In 2012 they reached the semi-finals but lost to the West Indies by 74 runs. In 2014

== History of Australia's One-Day International Shirts ==

.
