= History of Australian cricket from 1900–01 to 1918 =

This article describes the history of Australian cricket from the 1900–01 season until 1918.

Notable Australian players during this period include Joe Darling, Monty Noble, Victor Trumper, Clem Hill, Hugh Trumble, Warwick Armstrong, Charlie Macartney, Syd Gregory, Warren Bardsley, Bert Hopkins, Bill Howell, James Kelly, Tibby Cotter and Bill Whitty.

== Domestic cricket ==
The 1900–01 season was notable for Clem Hill's career-high 365* which enabled South Australia to defeat New South Wales by an innings. Hill went on to be the season's leading runscorer with 620 @ 103.33. The leading wicket-takers with 20 apiece were Jack Saunders @ 17.13 (BB 6/70) and Joe Travers @ 20.75 (BB 9/30).

When South Africa toured in 1910–11, Australia relied on the outstanding bowling of Bill Whitty who was the season's leading wicket-taker with 70 wickets @ 20.27 (BB 6/17). The top runscorer was Aubrey Faulkner of South Africa with 1534 runs @ 59.00 (HS 204); the leading home batsman was Victor Trumper with 1246 @ 69.22 (HS 214*).

The 1914–15 season was the last to be played before the First World War ended first-class cricket in Australia until December 1918. Jack Ryder, whose best years were after the war, was the leading runscorer in 1914–15 with 445 runs @ 74.16 (HS 151). The leading bowler was Bert Ironmonger with 36 wickets @ 17.52 (BB 7/69).

=== Sheffield Shield winners ===
- 1900–01 – Victoria
- 1901–02 – New South Wales
- 1902–03 – New South Wales
- 1903–04 – New South Wales
- 1904–05 – New South Wales
- 1905–06 – New South Wales
- 1906–07 – New South Wales
- 1907–08 – Victoria
- 1908–09 – New South Wales
- 1909–10 – South Australia
- 1910–11 – New South Wales
- 1911–12 – New South Wales
- 1912–13 – South Australia
- 1913–14 – New South Wales
- 1914–15 – Victoria
- 1915–18 – no competition due to World War I

== International tours of Australia ==
=== England 1901–02 ===
- 1st Test at Sydney Cricket Ground – England won by an innings and 124 runs
- 2nd Test at Melbourne Cricket Ground – Australia won by 229 runs
- 3rd Test at Adelaide Oval – Australia won by 4 wickets
- 4th Test at Sydney Cricket Ground – Australia won by 7 wickets
- 5th Test at Melbourne Cricket Ground – Australia won by 32 runs

For more information about this tour, see: English cricket team in Australia in 1901-02

=== England 1902–03 ===
An English team managed by Lord Hawke toured Australia and New Zealand in 1902–03. The team was captained by Plum Warner and included Bernard Bosanquet, Frederick Fane, Cuthbert Burnup and George Thompson. They played three first-class matches in Australia versus New South Wales, South Australia and Victoria.

=== England 1903–04 ===
- 1st Test at Sydney Cricket Ground – England won by 5 wickets
- 2nd Test at Melbourne Cricket Ground – England won by 185 runs
- 3rd Test at Adelaide Oval – Australia won by 216 runs
- 4th Test at Sydney Cricket Ground – England won by 157 runs
- 5th Test at Melbourne Cricket Ground – Australia won by 218 runs

For more information about this tour, see: English cricket team in Australia in 1903-04

=== England 1907–08 ===
- 1st Test at Sydney Cricket Ground – Australia won by 2 wickets
- 2nd Test at Melbourne Cricket Ground – England won by 1 wicket
- 3rd Test at Adelaide Oval – Australia won by 245 runs
- 4th Test at Melbourne Cricket Ground – Australia won by 308 runs
- 5th Test at Sydney Cricket Ground – Australia won by 49 runs

For more information about this tour, see: English cricket team in Australia in 1907-08

=== South Africa 1910–11 ===
- 1st Test at Sydney Cricket Ground – Australia won by an innings and 114 runs
- 2nd Test at Melbourne Cricket Ground – Australia won by 89 runs
- 3rd Test at Adelaide Oval – South Africa won by 38 runs
- 4th Test at Melbourne Cricket Ground – Australia won by 530 runs
- 5th Test at Sydney Cricket Ground – Australia won by 7 wickets

=== England 1911–12 ===
- 1st Test at Sydney Cricket Ground – Australia won by 146 runs
- 2nd Test at Melbourne Cricket Ground – England won by 8 wickets
- 3rd Test at Adelaide Oval – England won by 7 wickets
- 4th Test at Melbourne Cricket Ground – England won by an innings and 225 runs
- 5th Test at Sydney Cricket Ground – England won by 70 runs

For more information about this tour, see: English cricket team in Australia in 1911-12

=== New Zealand 1913–14 ===
This was New Zealand's second tour of Australia. Four matches were played in December 1913 and January 1914. New Zealand played each of Queensland, New South Wales, Victoria and South Australia.

New Zealand secured its first victory in Australia by winning the opening game against Queensland at Brisbane Cricket Ground by 12 runs. They owed the victory to team captain Dan Reese who took 7–53 in Queensland's first innings.

New Zealand lost to both New South Wales and Victoria by an innings but managed a draw against South Australia.

== External sources ==
- CricketArchive — itinerary of Australian cricket
