= History of Australian cricket from 1930–31 to 1945 =

This article describes the history of Australian cricket from the 1930–31 season until 1945.

Notable Australian players during this period include Don Bradman, Bert Oldfield, Bill O'Reilly, Bill Woodfull, Bill Ponsford and Stan McCabe.

== Domestic cricket ==
=== Sheffield Shield winners ===
- 1930–31 – Victoria
- 1931–32 – New South Wales
- 1932–33 – New South Wales
- 1933–34 – Victoria
- 1934–35 – Victoria
- 1935–36 – South Australia
- 1936–37 – Victoria
- 1937–38 – New South Wales
- 1938–39 – South Australia
- 1939–40 – New South Wales
- 1941–45 – no competition due to Second World War

== International tours of Australia ==
=== West Indies 1930–31 ===
For information about this tour, see: West Indian cricket team in Australia in 1930-31

=== South Africa 1931–32 ===
For information about this tour, see: South African cricket team in Australia in 1931-32

=== England 1932–33 ===
For information about this tour, see: English cricket team in Australia in 1932-33

=== MCC 1935–36 ===
For information about this tour, see: Marylebone Cricket Club cricket team in Australia in 1935–36

=== England 1936–37 ===
For information about this tour, see: English cricket team in Australia in 1936-37

=== New Zealand 1937–38 ===
For information about this tour, see: New Zealand cricket team in Australia and Ceylon in 1937–38

== External sources ==
- CricketArchive — itinerary of Australian cricket
