= 2016–17 Sydney Sixers season =

Sydney Sixers
2016–17 season
- Coach: Greg Shipperd (2nd season)
- Captain(s): Moises Henriques
- Home ground: Sydney Cricket Ground, Sydney
- BBL: 2nd
- BBL Finals: TBD
- Leading Run Scorer: Daniel Hughes (196)
- Leading Wicket Taker: Sean Abbott (13)

The 2016–17 Sydney Sixers season is the club's sixth consecutive season in the Big Bash League (BBL).

== Players ==
=== Squad ===
Players with international caps are listed in bold.

S/N	Name	Nat.	Date of birth (age)	Batting style	Bowling style	Notes
Batsmen
15	Daniel Hughes	(Australia)	16 February 1989 (age 36)	Left-handed	Right arm medium	
41	Michael Lumb	(England)	12 February 1980 (age 45)	Left-handed	Right arm medium	Visa contract & International Cap
53	Nic Maddinson	(Australia)	21 December 1991 (age 33)	Left-handed	Left arm orthodox	International Cap
20	Jason Roy	(England)	21 July 1990 (age 34)	Right-handed	–	Visa contract & International Cap
14	Jordan Silk	(Australia)	13 April 1992 (age 32)	Right-handed	–	
49	Steve Smith	(Australia)	2 June 1989 (age 35)	Right-handed	Right-arm leg break	International Cap
All-rounders
77	Sean Abbott	(Australia)	29 February 1992 (age 33)	Right-handed	Right arm fast medium	International Cap
22	Johan Botha	(South Africa)	2 May 1982 (age 42)	Right-handed	Right arm off spin	Non-Visa Contract & International Cap
23	Ben Dwarshuis	(Australia)	23 June 1994 (age 30)	Left-handed	Left arm fast medium	
21	Moises Henriques	(Australia)	1 February 1987 (age 38)	Right-handed	Right arm fast medium	Captain & International Cap
72	Stephen O'Keefe	(Australia)	9 December 1984 (age 40)	Right-handed	Left arm orthodox	International Cap
Wicket-keepers
7	Sam Billings	(England)	15 June 1991 (age 33)	Right-handed	–	Visa contract & International Cap
1	Ryan Carters	(Australia)	25 July 1990 (age 34)	Right-handed	–	
24	Brad Haddin	(Australia)	23 October 1977 (age 47)	Right-handed	–	International Cap (International retiree)
Pace bowlers
33	Jackson Bird	(Australia)	11 December 1986 (age 38)	Right-handed	Right arm fast medium	International Cap
4	Doug Bollinger	(Australia)	24 July 1981 (age 43)	Left-handed	Left arm fast medium	International Cap
5	Harry Conway	(Australia)	17 September 1992 (age 32)	Right-handed	Right arm fast medium	
8	Josh Hazlewood	(Australia)	8 January 1991 (age 34)	Left-handed	Right arm fast medium	International cap
15	Joe Mennie	(Australia)	24 December 1988 (age 36)	Right-handed	Right arm fast medium	International Cap
56	Mitchell Starc	(Australia)	30 January 1990 (age 35)	Left-handed	Left-arm fast	International Cap
6	Henry Thornton	(Australia)	16 December 1996 (age 28)	Right-handed	Right arm fast	
Spin bowlers
67	Nathan Lyon	(Australia)	20 November 1987 (age 37)	Right-handed	Right arm off spin	International Cap
28	Will Somerville	(Australia)	9 August 1984 (age 40)	Right-handed	Right arm off spin	
52	Soumil Chhibber	(Australia)	16 June 1995 (age 29)	Right-handed	Right arm off spin	Development Rookie

== Big Bash League ==
=== Ladder ===
Pos	Team	Pld	W	L	NR	Pts	NRR	Qualification
1	Perth Scorchers (C)	8	5	3	0	10	0.618	Advanced to semi-finals
2	Brisbane Heat	8	5	3	0	10	0.516	Advanced to semi-finals
3	Sydney Sixers	8	5	3	0	10	−0.848	Advanced to semi-finals
4	Melbourne Stars	8	4	4	0	8	0.397	Advanced to semi-finals
5	Melbourne Renegades	8	4	4	0	8	0.042	
6	Adelaide Strikers	8	3	5	0	6	0.334	
7	Hobart Hurricanes	8	3	5	0	6	−0.530	
8	Sydney Thunder	8	3	5	0	6	−0.600	

(C) Champions

=== Results by round ===
Round	1	2	3	4	5	6	7	8
Ground	A	H	H	A	A	H	H	A
Result	W	L	W	L	W	W		
Position								

Updated to match(es) played on 11 January 2017. Source: bigbash.com.au
A = Away; H = Home; W = Win; D = Draw; L = Loss

=== Matches ===
20 December	(H) Sydney Thunder; 8/159 (20 overs)	v	Sydney Sixers; 1/160 (18 overs)	Sydney Sixers won by 9 wickets
19:40 (D/N); Scorecard	(H) Sydney Thunder; 8/159 (20 overs)	v	Sydney Sixers; 1/160 (18 overs)	Spotless Stadium; Attendance: 21,798; Umpires: John Ward and Paul Wilson; Player of the match: Moises Henriques (Sixers)
19:40 (D/N); Scorecard	Ryan Gibson 53 (43); Joe Mennie 2/16 (2 overs)		Moises Henriques 76* (41); Andre Russell 1/27 (4 overs)	Spotless Stadium; Attendance: 21,798; Umpires: John Ward and Paul Wilson; Player of the match: Moises Henriques (Sixers)
Sydney Sixers won the toss and elected to field.; Ryan Gibson (Thunder) made his T20 debut.; The crowd of 21,798 is the highest ever crowd for a cricket match at Spotless Stadium.				Spotless Stadium; Attendance: 21,798; Umpires: John Ward and Paul Wilson; Player of the match: Moises Henriques (Sixers)

23 December	Hobart Hurricanes; 6/200 (20 overs)	v	Sydney Sixers (H); 140 (16.2 overs)	Hobart Hurricanes won by 60 runs
18:10 (D/N); Scorecard	Hobart Hurricanes; 6/200 (20 overs)	v	Sydney Sixers (H); 140 (16.2 overs)	Sydney Cricket Ground; Attendance: 21,002; Umpires: Phillip Gillespie and Paul Wilson; Player of the match: D'Arcy Short (Hurricanes)
18:10 (D/N); Scorecard	Tim Paine 63 (45); Sean Abbott 2/41 (4 overs)		Sam Billings 42 (33); Clive Rose 2/14 (2 overs)	Sydney Cricket Ground; Attendance: 21,002; Umpires: Phillip Gillespie and Paul Wilson; Player of the match: D'Arcy Short (Hurricanes)
Sydney Sixers won the toss and elected to field.; D'Arcy Short (Hurricanes) made his T20 debut.				Sydney Cricket Ground; Attendance: 21,002; Umpires: Phillip Gillespie and Paul Wilson; Player of the match: D'Arcy Short (Hurricanes)

27 December	Perth Scorchers; 8/130 (20 overs)	v	Sydney Sixers (H); 4/132 (18 overs)	Sydney Sixers won by 6 wickets
19:10 (D/N); Scorecard	Perth Scorchers; 8/130 (20 overs)	v	Sydney Sixers (H); 4/132 (18 overs)	Sydney Cricket Ground; Attendance: 30,013; Umpires: Simon Fry and Michael Graham-Smith; Player of the match: Johan Botha (Sixers)
19:10 (D/N); Scorecard	Mitchell Marsh 31* (29); William Somerville 2/10 (2 overs)		Sam Billings 40 (30); Andrew Tye 3/15 (4 overs)	Sydney Cricket Ground; Attendance: 30,013; Umpires: Simon Fry and Michael Graham-Smith; Player of the match: Johan Botha (Sixers)
Perth Scorchers won the toss and elected to bat.				Sydney Cricket Ground; Attendance: 30,013; Umpires: Simon Fry and Michael Graham-Smith; Player of the match: Johan Botha (Sixers)

31 December	(H) Adelaide Strikers; 9/152 (20 overs)	v	Sydney Sixers; 104 (18.2 overs)	Adelaide Strikers won by 48 runs
18:40 (D/N); Scorecard	(H) Adelaide Strikers; 9/152 (20 overs)	v	Sydney Sixers; 104 (18.2 overs)	Adelaide Oval; Attendance: 45,471; Umpires: Ashley Barrow and Greg Davidson; Player of the match: Sean Abbott (Sixers)
18:40 (D/N); Scorecard	Ben Dunk 37 (20); Sean Abbott 5/16 (4 overs)		Sam Billings 40 (30); Billy Stanlake 3/17 (3.2 overs)	Adelaide Oval; Attendance: 45,471; Umpires: Ashley Barrow and Greg Davidson; Player of the match: Sean Abbott (Sixers)
Sydney Sixers won the toss and elected to field.; Tom Andrews (Strikers) made his T20 debut.				Adelaide Oval; Attendance: 45,471; Umpires: Ashley Barrow and Greg Davidson; Player of the match: Sean Abbott (Sixers)

3 January	(H) Brisbane Heat; 6/186 (20 overs)	v	Sydney Sixers; 7/191 (19.4 overs)	Sydney Sixers won by 3 wickets
18:10 (D/N); Scorecard	(H) Brisbane Heat; 6/186 (20 overs)	v	Sydney Sixers; 7/191 (19.4 overs)	The Gabba; Attendance: 32,371; Umpires: Ashley Barrow and Mick Martell; Player of the match: Daniel Hughes (Sixers)
18:10 (D/N); Scorecard	Joe Burns 51* (33); Sean Abbott 3/38 (4 overs)		Daniel Hughes 85 (55); Mitchell Swepson 2/25 (4 overs)	The Gabba; Attendance: 32,371; Umpires: Ashley Barrow and Mick Martell; Player of the match: Daniel Hughes (Sixers)
Sydney Sixers won the toss and elected to field.; Henry Thornton (Sixers) made his T20 debut.				The Gabba; Attendance: 32,371; Umpires: Ashley Barrow and Mick Martell; Player of the match: Daniel Hughes (Sixers)

9 January	Melbourne Renegades; 6/170 (20 overs)	v	Sydney Sixers (H); 4/171 (19.3 overs)	Sydney Sixers won by 6 wickets
19:40 (D/N); Scorecard	Melbourne Renegades; 6/170 (20 overs)	v	Sydney Sixers (H); 4/171 (19.3 overs)	Sydney Cricket Ground; Attendance: 30,702; Umpires: Shawn Craig and Tony Wilds; Player of the match: Brad Haddin (Sixers)
19:40 (D/N); Scorecard	Aaron Finch 57 (44); Ben Dwarshuis 3/35 (4 overs)		Daniel Hughes 41 (29); Thisara Perera 2/26 (4 overs)	Sydney Cricket Ground; Attendance: 30,702; Umpires: Shawn Craig and Tony Wilds; Player of the match: Brad Haddin (Sixers)
Melbourne Renegades won the toss and elected to bat.; The crowd of 30,702 is the highest crowd for a non-derby BBL match at the SCG.				Sydney Cricket Ground; Attendance: 30,702; Umpires: Shawn Craig and Tony Wilds; Player of the match: Brad Haddin (Sixers)

=== Home attendance ===
Game	Opponent	Attendance
2	Hobart Hurricanes	21,002
3	Perth Scorchers	30,013
6	Melbourne Renegades	30,702
7	Sydney Thunder	TBD
Total Attendance		81,717
Average Attendance		27,239
