= 2014–15 Sydney Sixers season =

Sydney Sixers
2014–15 season
- President: Stuart Clark
- Coach: Trevor Bayliss (4th season)
- Captain(s): Brad Haddin (4th season)
- Home ground: Sydney Cricket Ground, Sydney
- CLT20: DNQ
- BBL: 4th
- BBL Finals: Runners-Up
- Highest home attendance: 36,487
- Lowest home attendance: 12,789
- Average home attendance: 24,023 (home matches)
- Club membership: 1,915

The 2014–15 Sydney Sixers season was the club's fourth consecutive season in the Big Bash League (BBL).

Sydney Sixers came fourth overall after the regular season, qualifying for the finals series. The club reached the final at Manuka Oval in Canberra, but was defeated by 4 wickets on the last ball of the match by Perth Scorchers. The final was also the last match of Brett Lee's career as a cricketer.

== Players ==
=== Squad ===
Players with international caps are listed in bold.

No.	Name	Nat	Birth date	Batting style	Bowling style	Notes
Batsmen
14	Jordan Silk	(Australia)	13 April 1992 (age 33)	Right-handed	-	
27	**Ed Cowan**	(Australia)	16 June 1982 (age 43)	Left-handed	Right arm leg spin	
45	**Michael Lumb**	(England)	12 February 1980 (age 45)	Left-handed	Right arm medium	Overseas player
49	**Steve Smith**	(Australia)	2 June 1989 (age 36)	Right-handed	Right arm leg spin	
53	**Nic Maddinson**	(Australia)	21 December 1991 (age 33)	Left-handed	Left arm orthodox	
All-rounders
-	**Dwayne Smith**	(Barbados)	12 April 1983 (age 42)	Right-handed	Right arm medium	Overseas player. Initially announced as contracted player pre-season but was unable to participate in tournament.
21	**Moises Henriques**	(Australia)	1 February 1987 (age 38)	Right-handed	Right arm fast medium	
72	**Stephen O'Keefe**	(Australia)	9 December 1984 (age 40)	Right-handed	Left arm orthodox	
77	**Sean Abbott**	(Australia)	29 February 1992 (age 33)	Right-handed	Right arm fast medium	
23	Ben Dwarshuis	(Australia)	23 June 1994 (age 31)	Left-handed	Left arm fast medium	
94	Simon Keen	(Australia)	4 October 1987 (age 37)	Left-handed	Right arm medium	Injury replacement player for Trent Copeland
Wicketkeepers
24	**Brad Haddin**	(Australia)	23 October 1977 (age 47)	Right-handed	–	Captain
1	Ryan Carters	(Australia)	25 July 1990 (age 35)	Right-handed	–	
50	Riki Wessels	(Australia)	12 November 1985 (age 39)	Right-handed	–	
Pace bowlers
58	**Brett Lee**	(Australia)	8 November 1976 (age 48)	Right-handed	Right arm fast	
56	**Mitchell Starc**	(Australia)	30 January 1990 (age 35)	Left-handed	Left-arm fast medium	
8	**Josh Hazlewood**	(Australia)	8 January 1991 (age 34)	Left-handed	Right arm fast medium	
4	**Doug Bollinger**	(Australia)	24 July 1981 (age 44)	Left-handed	Left arm fast medium	
9	**Trent Copeland**	(Australia)	14 March 1986 (age 39)	Right-handed	Right arm fast medium	
Spin bowlers
67	**Nathan Lyon**	(Australia)	20 November 1987 (age 37)	Right-handed	Right arm off spin	
-	Luke Doran	(Australia)	14 August 1991 (age 34)	Right-handed	Left arm orthodox	Injury replacement player for Stephen O'Keefe

=== Transfers ===
In:

Nat	Name	Role	Previous team
(Barbados)	Dwayne Smith	All-rounder	Perth Scorchers
(Australia)	Ryan Carters	Wicket-keeper	Sydney Thunder
(Australia)	Doug Bollinger	Bowler	Hobart Hurricanes
(Australia)	Luke Doran	Bowler	Sydney Thunder
(Australia)	Simon Keen	All-rounder	Uncontracted in BBL03
(Australia)	Riki Wessels	Wicket-keeper	Uncontracted in BBL03

Out:

Nat	Name	Role	Going to
(Australia)	Ravi Bopara	All-rounder	Not re-signed
(Australia)	Marcus North	Batsmen	Retired
(Australia)	Mark Cosgrove	Batsmen	Not re-signed
(Papua New Guinea)	Charles Amini	All-rounder	Not re-signed
(Australia)	Daniel Smith	Wicket-keeper	Not re-signed
(England)	Chris Tremlett	Bowler	Not re-signed
(Australia)	Josh Lalor	Bowler	Not re-signed
(Australia)	Shane Cassel	Bowler	Not re-signed

== Champions League Twenty20 ==
As the Sydney Sixers lost in the semi-finals to the Perth Scorchers, they did not qualify for the 2014 Champions League Twenty20 tournament.

== Big Bash League ==
=== Ladder ===
Pos	Team	Pld	W	L	NR	Pts	NRR	Qualification
1	Adelaide Strikers	8	6	1	1	13	1.159	Advanced to semi-finals
2	Perth Scorchers (C)	8	5	3	0	10	0.705	Advanced to semi-finals
3	Melbourne Stars	8	5	3	0	10	0.336	Advanced to semi-finals
4	Sydney Sixers	8	5	3	0	10	−0.014	Advanced to semi-finals
5	Hobart Hurricanes	8	3	5	0	6	−0.280	
6	Melbourne Renegades	8	3	5	0	6	−0.331	
7	Sydney Thunder	8	2	5	1	5	−0.485	
8	Brisbane Heat	8	2	6	0	4	−1.116	

(C) Champions

=== Matches ===
Times shown are in Australian Western Standard Time (UTC+08) for Perth, Australian Central Daylight Time (UTC+10:30) for Adelaide, Australian Eastern Standard Time (UTC+10:00) for Brisbane and Australian Eastern Daylight Time (UTC+11:00) for all remaining venues.

19 December	Melbourne Renegades; 7/154 (20 overs)	v	(H) Sydney Sixers; 2/158 (18.5 overs)	Sydney Sixers won by 8 wickets
19:40 (D/N); Scorecard	Melbourne Renegades; 7/154 (20 overs)	v	(H) Sydney Sixers; 2/158 (18.5 overs)	Sydney Cricket Ground; Attendance: 12,789; Umpires: Ashley Barrow (Aus) and Damien Mealey (Aus); Player of the match: Nic Maddinson (Sixers)
19:40 (D/N); Scorecard	Callum Ferguson 40 (32); Sean Abbott 2/20 (4 overs)		Nic Maddinson 84* (54); Nathan Rimmington 1/22 (3 overs)	Sydney Cricket Ground; Attendance: 12,789; Umpires: Ashley Barrow (Aus) and Damien Mealey (Aus); Player of the match: Nic Maddinson (Sixers)
Sydney Sixers won the toss and elected to field; Ben Dwarshuis (Sixers) made his Twenty20 debut				Sydney Cricket Ground; Attendance: 12,789; Umpires: Ashley Barrow (Aus) and Damien Mealey (Aus); Player of the match: Nic Maddinson (Sixers)

23 December	(H) Hobart Hurricanes; 8/154 (19 overs)	v	Sydney Sixers; 3/158 (18.1 overs)	Sydney Sixers won by 7 wickets
19:10 (D/N); Scorecard	(H) Hobart Hurricanes; 8/154 (19 overs)	v	Sydney Sixers; 3/158 (18.1 overs)	Bellerive Oval, Hobart; Umpires: Paul Wilson (Aus) and Michael Graham-Smith (Aus); Player of the match: Moises Henriques (Sixers)
19:10 (D/N); Scorecard	George Bailey 71 (44); Brett Lee 3/34 (4 overs)		Michael Lumb 44 (31); Cameron Boyce 1/24 (4 overs)	Bellerive Oval, Hobart; Umpires: Paul Wilson (Aus) and Michael Graham-Smith (Aus); Player of the match: Moises Henriques (Sixers)
Hobart Hurricanes won the toss and elected to bat; Match reduced to 19 overs per side due to rain; Sydney Sixers took a team hat-trick				Bellerive Oval, Hobart; Umpires: Paul Wilson (Aus) and Michael Graham-Smith (Aus); Player of the match: Moises Henriques (Sixers)

27 December	Sydney Sixers; 7/180 (20 overs)	v	(H) Sydney Thunder; 5/164 (20 overs)	Sydney Sixers won by 16 runs
19:10 (D/N); Scorecard	Sydney Sixers; 7/180 (20 overs)	v	(H) Sydney Thunder; 5/164 (20 overs)	Stadium Australia, Sydney; Umpires: Paul Wilson (Aus) and Sam Nogajski (Aus); Player of the match: Aiden Blizzard (Thunder)
19:10 (D/N); Scorecard	Rikki Wessels 50 (33); Gurinder Sandhu 2/28 (4 overs)		Aiden Blizzard 80 (42); Sean Abbott 2/28 (4 overs)	Stadium Australia, Sydney; Umpires: Paul Wilson (Aus) and Sam Nogajski (Aus); Player of the match: Aiden Blizzard (Thunder)
Sydney Thunder won the toss and elected to bowl				Stadium Australia, Sydney; Umpires: Paul Wilson (Aus) and Sam Nogajski (Aus); Player of the match: Aiden Blizzard (Thunder)

29 December	Perth Scorchers; 7/135 (20 overs)	v	Sydney Sixers (H); 99 (17.3 overs)	Perth Scorchers won by 36 runs
19:10 (D/N); Scorecard	Perth Scorchers; 7/135 (20 overs)	v	Sydney Sixers (H); 99 (17.3 overs)	Sydney Cricket Ground; Attendance: 24,477; Umpires: Sam Nojagski (Aus) and Shawn Craig (Aus); Player of the match: Andrew Tye (Scorchers)
19:10 (D/N); Scorecard	Marcus Harris 36 (26); Mitchell Starc 2/21 (4 overs)		Riki Wessels 28 (26); Ashton Turner 2/3 (1 over)	Sydney Cricket Ground; Attendance: 24,477; Umpires: Sam Nojagski (Aus) and Shawn Craig (Aus); Player of the match: Andrew Tye (Scorchers)
Perth Scorchers won the toss and elected to bat				Sydney Cricket Ground; Attendance: 24,477; Umpires: Sam Nojagski (Aus) and Shawn Craig (Aus); Player of the match: Andrew Tye (Scorchers)

5 January	Sydney Sixers; 6/150 (20 overs)	v	Melbourne Stars (H); 4/150 (20 overs)	Scores level;Stars won the Super Over
19:10 (D/N); Scorecard	Sydney Sixers; 6/150 (20 overs)	v	Melbourne Stars (H); 4/150 (20 overs)	Melbourne Cricket Ground; Attendance: 22,098; Umpires: Sam Nojagski and Paul Wilson; Player of the match: James Faulkner (Stars)
19:10 (D/N); Scorecard	Michael Lumb 80 (61); Scott Boland 2/19 (4 overs)		Kevin Pietersen 54 (43); Ben Dwarshuis 2/31 (4 overs)	Melbourne Cricket Ground; Attendance: 22,098; Umpires: Sam Nojagski and Paul Wilson; Player of the match: James Faulkner (Stars)
Melbourne Stars won the toss and elected to field				Melbourne Cricket Ground; Attendance: 22,098; Umpires: Sam Nojagski and Paul Wilson; Player of the match: James Faulkner (Stars)

11 January	(H) Brisbane Heat; 6/147 (20 overs)	v	Sydney Sixers; 4/148 (17.4 overs)	Sydney Sixers won by 6 wickets
18:10 (D/N); Scorecard	(H) Brisbane Heat; 6/147 (20 overs)	v	Sydney Sixers; 4/148 (17.4 overs)	The Gabba, Woolloongabba, Brisbane; Attendance: 28,724; Umpires: Paul Wilson and Damien Mealey; Player of the match: Doug Bollinger (Sixers)
18:10 (D/N); Scorecard	Peter Forrest 62* (56); Brett Lee 2/29 (4 overs)		Ryan Carters 30* (21); James Hopes 2/23 (3 overs)	The Gabba, Woolloongabba, Brisbane; Attendance: 28,724; Umpires: Paul Wilson and Damien Mealey; Player of the match: Doug Bollinger (Sixers)
Sydney Sixers won the toss and elected to field				The Gabba, Woolloongabba, Brisbane; Attendance: 28,724; Umpires: Paul Wilson and Damien Mealey; Player of the match: Doug Bollinger (Sixers)

14 January	Adelaide Strikers; 6/182 (20 overs)	v	Sydney Sixers (H); 159 (19.4 overs)	Adelaide Strikers won by 23 runs
19:10 (D/N); Scorecard	Adelaide Strikers; 6/182 (20 overs)	v	Sydney Sixers (H); 159 (19.4 overs)	Sydney Cricket Ground; Attendance: 21,644; Umpires: Sam Nojagski and Michael Graham-Smith; Player of the match: Johan Botha (Strikers)
19:10 (D/N); Scorecard	Craig Simmons 46 (34); Steve O'Keefe 1/21 (4 overs)		Jordan Silk 67 (34); Johan Botha 2/27 (4 overs)	Sydney Cricket Ground; Attendance: 21,644; Umpires: Sam Nojagski and Michael Graham-Smith; Player of the match: Johan Botha (Strikers)
Adelaide Strikers won the toss and elected to bat				Sydney Cricket Ground; Attendance: 21,644; Umpires: Sam Nojagski and Michael Graham-Smith; Player of the match: Johan Botha (Strikers)

22 January	Sydney Thunder; 4/154 (20 overs)	v	Sydney Sixers (H); 6/155 (20 overs)	Sydney Sixers won by 4 wickets
19:40 (D/N); Scorecard	Sydney Thunder; 4/154 (20 overs)	v	Sydney Sixers (H); 6/155 (20 overs)	Sydney Cricket Ground; Attendance: 36,487; Umpires: Geoff Joshua and Ashley Barrow; Player of the match: Jordan Silk (Sixers)
19:40 (D/N); Scorecard	Jacques Kallis 56 (43); Nathan Lyon 3/19 (4 overs)		Jordan Silk 69* (43); Josh Lalor 4/29 (4 overs)	Sydney Cricket Ground; Attendance: 36,487; Umpires: Geoff Joshua and Ashley Barrow; Player of the match: Jordan Silk (Sixers)
Sydney Sixers won the toss and elected to field; The crowd of 36,487 was the highest in NSW domestic cricket history beating the previous record (32,823) set earlier in the season between the same teams.; Jake Doran and Chris Green (both Thunder) made their Twenty20 debuts				Sydney Cricket Ground; Attendance: 36,487; Umpires: Geoff Joshua and Ashley Barrow; Player of the match: Jordan Silk (Sixers)

=== Finals ===
The top four teams from the group stage qualified for the semi-finals.

==== Playoff tree ====
Semifinals
4	Sydney Sixers	4/181 (20 ov)
1	Adelaide Strikers (H)	94 (14.3 ov)
2	Perth Scorchers (H)	7/144 (20 ov)
3	Melbourne Stars	126 (19.5 ov)

Final
4	Sydney Sixers	5/147 (20 ov)
2	Perth Scorchers	6/148 (20 ov)

==== Matches ====
24 January	Sydney Sixers; 4/181 (20 overs)	v	Adelaide Strikers (H); 94 (14.3 overs)	Sydney Sixers won by 87 runs
18:40 (D/N) Semi-final 1 Scorecard	Sydney Sixers; 4/181 (20 overs)	v	Adelaide Strikers (H); 94 (14.3 overs)	Adelaide Oval; Attendance: 52,633; Umpires: Gerard Abood and Mick Martell; Player of the match: Nic Maddinson (Sixers)
18:40 (D/N) Semi-final 1 Scorecard	Nic Maddinson 85 (48); Shaun Tait 1/30 (4 overs)		Ben Laughlin 22 (10); Doug Bollinger 3/21 (3 overs)	Adelaide Oval; Attendance: 52,633; Umpires: Gerard Abood and Mick Martell; Player of the match: Nic Maddinson (Sixers)
Sydney Sixers won the toss and elected to bat; The crowd of 52,633 was the highest for any sport at the re-developed Adelaide Oval. It was also the highest ever Australian domestic cricket crowd.				Adelaide Oval; Attendance: 52,633; Umpires: Gerard Abood and Mick Martell; Player of the match: Nic Maddinson (Sixers)

28 January	Sydney Sixers; 5/147 (20 overs)	v	Perth Scorchers; 6/148 (20 overs)	Perth Scorchers won by 4 wickets
19:40 (D/N) Final Scorecard	Sydney Sixers; 5/147 (20 overs)	v	Perth Scorchers; 6/148 (20 overs)	Manuka Oval, Canberra; Attendance: 11,741; Umpires: Mick Martell and Paul Wilson; Player of the match: Shaun Marsh (Scorchers)
19:40 (D/N) Final Scorecard	Moises Henriques 77 (57); Jason Behrendorff 1/19 (4 overs)		Shaun Marsh 73 (59); Brett Lee 3/25 (4 overs)	Manuka Oval, Canberra; Attendance: 11,741; Umpires: Mick Martell and Paul Wilson; Player of the match: Shaun Marsh (Scorchers)
Sydney Sixers won the toss and elected to bat				Manuka Oval, Canberra; Attendance: 11,741; Umpires: Mick Martell and Paul Wilson; Player of the match: Shaun Marsh (Scorchers)

=== Player statistics ===
- Statistics include all finals games
- Key: Hover over heading for tooltips

Player			Batting									Fielding		Bowling							
#	Name	M	I	NO	R	B	SR	Ave	HS	50	6s	C	S	O	M	R	W	Eco	Ave	BBI	SR
1	Ryan Carters	10	8	3	112	90	124.44	22.40	35*	0	2	13	0	-	-	-	-	-	-	-	-
4	Doug Bollinger	10	2	0	1	2	50.00	0.50	1	0	0	6	0	34.0	0	294	9	8.64	32.66	3/21	22.6
6	Luke Doran	4	2	1	2	4	50.00	2.00	1*	0	0	1	0	8.0	0	69	3	8.62	32.66	2/22	16.0
8	Josh Hazlewood	0	-	-	-	-	-	-	-	-	-	-	-	-	-	-	-	-	-	-	-
9	Trent Copeland	0	-	-	-	-	-	-	-	-	-	-	-	-	-	-	-	-	-	-	-
14	Jordan Silk	10	9	4	272	199	136.68	54.40	69*	2	9	4	0	-	-	-	-	-	-	-	-
21	Moises Henriques	9	9	2	245	205	119.51	35.00	77	1	6	5	0	24.0	0	153	5	6.37	30.60	2/22	28.8
23	Ben Dwarshuis	3	-	-	-	-	-	-	-	-	-	1	0	10.0	0	95	4	9.50	23.75	2/31	15.0
24	Brad Haddin	0	-	-	-	-	-	-	-	-	-	-	-	-	-	-	-	-	-	-	-
27	Ed Cowan	2	2	1	1	5	20.00	1.00	1*	0	0	0	0	-	-	-	-	-	-	-	-
45	Michael Lumb	10	10	0	265	215	123.25	26.50	80	1	9	4	0	-	-	-	-	-	-	-	-
49	Steve Smith	0	-	-	-	-	-	-	-	-	-	-	-	-	-	-	-	-	-	-	-
50	Riki Wessels	9	9	0	205	182	112.63	22.77	50	1	4	2	0	-	-	-	-	-	-	-	-
53	Nic Maddinson	10	10	1	284	193	147.15	31.55	85	2	16	2	0	-	-	-	-	-	-	-	-
56	Mitchell Starc	2	2	1	3	4	75.00	3.00	3*	0	0	1	0	8.0	0	57	3	7.12	19.00	2/21	16.0
58	Brett Lee	10	2	1	14	9	155.55	14.00	7*	0	0	2	0	39.0	0	279	13	7.15	21.46	3/25	18.0
67	Nathan Lyon	4	1	1	4	4	100.00	-	4*	0	0	1	0	15.0	0	107	8	7.13	13.37	3/19	11.2
72	Stephen O'Keefe	6	3	2	14	8	175.00	14.00	9*	0	0	0	0	19.3	0	126	3	6.46	42.00	2/17	39.0
77	Sean Abbott	10	5	0	33	33	100.00	6.60	21	0	1	4	0	35.0	0	274	9	7.82	30.44	2/14	23.3
94	Simon Keen	1	-	-	-	-	-	-	-	-	-	1	0	1.0	0	10	0	10.00	-	-	-

Source: Cricinfo

== Popularity ==
The 2014-15 Big Bash League season saw a significant increase in crowds as well as TV viewership on Network Ten for the Sydney Sixers matches. Major statistics for the season were as follows:

- Total Sixers membership tally was 1915, an increase of 25% compared to 2013-14 season.
- The crowd of 36,487 for the derby match against Sydney Thunder on January 22, 2015, was the highest ever in NSW domestic cricket history beating the previous record crowd of 32,823 set earlier in the season between the same teams.
- Average home crowd of 24,023, an increase of 22% compared to 2013-14 season.
- The Sixers matches during the Big Bash League had an average viewership of 1,000,072 for each game on TV. These are the highest average ratings for any sports club which is based in Sydney.
