= 2023–24 Sydney Sixers season =

Overview of Sydney Sixers in 2023–24

Sydney Sixers
2023–24 season
- Coach: Greg Shipperd
- Captain(s): Moises Henriques
- Home ground: Sydney Cricket Ground
- BBL Season: 2nd
- BBL finals: Runner-up
- Leading Wicket Taker: Ben Dwarshuis (17)

The 2023–24 Sydney Sixers season was the eleventh in the club's history. Coached by Greg Shipperd and captained by Moises Henriques they had competed in the BBL's 2023–24 season.

== Squad information ==
The current squad of the Sydney Sixers for the 2023–24 Big Bash League season as of 10 October 2023.

- Players with international caps are listed in **bold**.

S/N	Name	Nat.	Date of birth (age)	Batting style	Bowling style	Notes
Batsmen
9	**James Vince**	England	14 March 1991 (age 35)	Right-handed	Right-arm medium	Visa contract & International Cap
41	**Kurtis Patterson**	Australia	5 May 1993 (age 33)	Left-handed	—N/a	International
14	Jordan Silk	Australia	13 April 1992 (age 34)	Right-handed	Right arm medium	
16	Daniel Hughes	Australia	16 February 1989 (age 37)	Left-handed	Right arm medium	Vice-captain
18	Jack Edwards	Australia	19 April 2000 (age 26)	Right-handed	Right arm medium	
All-rounders
21	**Moises Henriques**	Australia	1 February 1987 (age 39)	Right-handed	Right-arm medium-fast	Captain & International Cap
50	Hayden Kerr	Australia	10 April 1996 (age 30)	Right-handed	Right arm medium-fast	
77	**Sean Abbott**	Australia	29 February 1992 (age 34)	Right-handed	Right-arm fast-medium	International Cap
Wicket-keepers
22	**Josh Philippe**	Australia	1 June 1997 (age 29)	Right-handed	Right-arm medium	
Pace bowlers
27	**Ben Dwarshuis**	Australia	23 June 1994 (age 32)	Left-handed	Left arm fast-medium	
33	**Jackson Bird**	Australia	11 December 1986 (age 39)	Right-handed	Right arm fast-medium	International Cap
59	**Tom Curran**	England	12 March 1995 (age 31)	Right-handed	Right-arm fast medium	Visa contract & International Cap
78	Mickey Edwards	Australia	23 December 1994 (age 31)	Right-handed	Right arm fast-medium	
Spin bowlers
7	Lloyd Pope	Australia	1 December 1999 (age 26)	Right-handed	Right arm leg break	
	Joel Davies	Australia	28 October 2003 (age 22)	Left-handed	Slow left arm orthodox	
36	**Todd Murphy**	Australia	15 November 2000 (age 25)	Left-handed	Right arm off break	International
	**Rehan Ahmed**	England	13 August 2004 (age 22)	Right-handed	Right-arm leg spin	Overseas Draft Pick (Bronze) & International
72	**Steve O'Keefe**	Australia	9 December 1984 (age 41)	Right-handed	Slow left arm orthodox	International Cap

== Standings ==
Pos	Team	Pld	W	L	NR	Pts	NRR	Qualification
1	Brisbane Heat (C)	10	7	1	2	16	0.972	Advanced to Qualifier
2	Sydney Sixers	10	6	2	2	14	0.339	Advanced to Qualifier
3	Perth Scorchers	10	6	3	1	13	0.725	Advanced to Knockout
4	Adelaide Strikers	10	5	4	1	11	0.331	Advanced to Knockout
5	Hobart Hurricanes	10	4	6	0	8	−0.268	
6	Melbourne Stars	10	4	6	0	8	−1.051	
7	Melbourne Renegades	10	2	6	2	6	−0.289	
8	Sydney Thunder	10	1	7	2	4	−0.652	

Source: ESPNcricinfo
(C) Champions

== Regular season ==
Match 2
8 December 2023
19:15 (N)
Scorecard

Sydney Sixers; 6/175 (20 overs)	v	Melbourne Renegades; 7/167 (20 overs)
Steve Smith 61 (42); Will Sutherland 2/21 (4 overs)		Will Sutherland 51* (30); Ben Dwarshuis 3/36 (4 overs)

Sydney Sixers won by 8 runs
Sydney Cricket Ground, Sydney
Attendance: 13,089
Umpires: Bruce Oxenford and Michael Graham-Smith
Player of the match: Steve Smith (Sydney Sixers)

- Melbourne Renegades won the toss and elected to field.

Match 5
11 December 2023
19:15 (N)
Scorecard

Hobart Hurricanes; 8/135 (20 overs)	v	Sydney Sixers; 4/139 (19.2 overs)
Caleb Jewell 42 (24); Tom Curran 3/19 (4 overs)		Daniel Hughes 60* (50); Corey Anderson 2/10 (3.3 overs)

Sydney Sixers won by 6 wickets
York Park, Launceston
Umpires: Greg Davidson and Nathan Johnstone
Player of the match: Daniel Hughes (Sydney Sixers)

- Hobart Hurricanes won the toss and elected to bat.

Match 11
22 December 2023
19:15 (N)
Scorecard

Sydney Sixers; 7/155 (20 overs)	v	Adelaide Strikers; 6/154 (20 overs)
Jordan Silk 66* (45); Jamie Overton 3/23 (4 overs)		Matthew Short 55 (48); Moises Henriques 2/11 (2 overs)

Sydney Sixers won by 1 run
Sydney Cricket Ground, Sydney
Attendance: 18,368
Umpires: Donovan Koch and Gerard Abood
Player of the match: Jordan Silk (Sydney Sixers)

- Adelaide Strikers won the toss and elected to field.

Match 14
26 December 2023
18:05 (N)
Scorecard

Sydney Sixers; 8/154 (20 overs)	v	Melbourne Stars; 6/155 (19.3 overs)
James Vince 83 (55); Usama Mir 3/19 (4 overs)		Hilton Cartwright 47* (30); Sean Abbott 2/32 (4 overs)

Melbourne Stars won by 4 wickets
Sydney Cricket Ground, Sydney
Attendance: 16,269
Umpires: Gerard Abood and Paul Wilson
Player of the match: Hilton Cartwright (Melbourne Stars)

- Melbourne Stars won the toss and elected to field.

Match 19
30 December 2023
19:15 (N)
Scorecard

Sydney Thunder; 7/151 (20 overs)	v	Sydney Sixers; 1/34 (4 overs)
Alex Ross 44 (39); Jack Edwards 3/24 (4 overs)		Kurtis Patterson 13* (9); Chris Green 1/12 (1 over)

No result
Sydney Showground Stadium, Sydney
Attendance: 22,102
Umpires: Greg Davidson and Sam Nogajski

- Sydney Thunder won the toss and elected to bat.
- No further play was possible due to rain.

Match 22
1 January 2024
18:15 (N)
Scorecard

Brisbane Heat	v	Sydney Sixers

Match abandoned without a ball bowled
The Gabba, Brisbane
Attendance: –
Umpires: Stephen Dionysius and Ben Treloar

- No toss.
- No play was possible due to rain.

Match 24
3 January 2024
18:05 (N)
Scorecard

Sydney Sixers; 8/141 (20 overs)	v	Brisbane Heat; 4/104 (14.3 overs)
Josh Philippe 41 (36); Matthew Kuhnemann 2/19 (4 overs)		Josh Brown 43 (31); Ben Dwarshuis 1/7 (2 overs)

Brisbane Heat won by 3 runs (DLS method)
Coffs Harbour International Stadium, Coffs Harbour
Attendance: 10,372
Umpires: Simon Lightbody and Paul Wilson
Player of the match: Paul Walter (Brisbane Heat)

- Brisbane Heat won the toss and elected to field.
- No further play was possible due to rain.

Match 28
6 January 2024
19:15 (N)
Scorecard

Melbourne Stars; 4/156 (20 overs)	v	Sydney Sixers; 3/160 (18.1 overs)
Dan Lawrence 36 (34); Todd Murphy 2/15 (4 overs)		James Vince 79 (57); Scott Boland 2/38 (4 overs)

Sydney Sixers won by 7 wickets
Melbourne Cricket Ground, Melbourne
Attendance: –
Player of the match: James Vince (Sydney Sixers)

- Sydney Sixers won the toss and elected to field.

Match 34
12 January 2024
19:15 (N)
Scorecard

Sydney Sixers; 7/151 (20 overs)	v	Sydney Thunder; 132 (19.5 overs)
Josh Philippe 47 (35); Nathan McAndrew 2/17 (3 overs)		David Warner 37 (39); Steve O'Keefe 3/13 (4 overs)

Sydney Sixers won by 19 runs
Sydney Cricket Ground, Sydney
Attendance: 41,027
Umpires: Shawn Craig and Simon Lightbody
Player of the match: Steve O'Keefe (Sydney Sixers)

- Sydney Thunder won the toss and elected to field.

Match 39
16 January 2024
16:40 AWST (D/N)
Scorecard

Perth Scorchers; 4/197 (20 overs)	v	Sydney Sixers; 7/201 (20 overs)
Laurie Evans 72 (34); Ben Dwarshuis 2/23 (4 overs)		Daniel Hughes 74 (43); Jason Behrendorff 3/35 (4 overs)

Sydney Sixers won by 3 wickets
Optus Stadium, Perth
Attendance: 33,412
Umpires: Nathan Johnstone and Sam Nogajski
Player of the match: Daniel Hughes (Sydney Sixers)

- Perth Scorchers won the toss and elected to bat.

== Play-offs ==
=== Matches ===
Qualifier
19 January 2024
18:40 AEST (N)
Scorecard

Sydney Sixers; 152/8 (20 overs)	v	Brisbane Heat; 113 (17.5 overs)
Moises Henriques 59 (50); Michael Neser 3/27 (4 overs)		Jimmy Peirson 26 (25); Ben Dwarshuis 5/21 (3.5 overs)

Sydney Sixers won by 39 runs
Heritage Bank Stadium, Carrara
Attendance: –
Umpires: Michael Graham-Smith and Sam Nogajski
Player of the match: Ben Dwarshuis (Sydney Sixers)

- Brisbane Heat won the toss and elected to field.

Final
24 January 2024
19:15 AEDT (N)
Scorecard

Brisbane Heat; 8/166 (20 overs)	v	Sydney Sixers; 112 (17.3 overs)
Josh Brown 53 (38); Sean Abbott 4/32 (4 overs)		Moises Henriques 25 (27); Spencer Johnson 4/26 (4 overs)

Brisbane Heat won by 54 runs
Sydney Cricket Ground, Sydney
Attendance: 43,153
Umpires: Gerard Abood and Sam Nogajski
Player of the match: Spencer Johnson (Brisbane Heat)

- Sydney Sixers won the toss and elected to field.
