= 2021–22 Sydney Sixers season =

Overview of Sydney Sixers in 2021–22

Sydney Sixers
2021–22 season
- Coach: Greg Shipperd
- Captain(s): Moises Henriques
- Home ground: Sydney Cricket Ground
- BBL Season: 2nd
- BBL Finals: Runner up
- Leading Run Scorer: Moises Henriques (440)
- Leading Wicket Taker: Hayden Kerr (25)

The 2021–22 Sydney Sixers season was the eleventh in the club's history. Coached by Greg Shipperd and captained by Moises Henriques they had competed in the BBL's 2021–22 season.

== Standings ==
Pos	Team	Pld	W	L	NR	BP	Pts	NRR	Qualification
1	Perth Scorchers (C)	14	11	3	0	7	40	0.926	Advanced to play-off phase
2	Sydney Sixers	14	9	4	1	6	35	1.027	Advanced to play-off phase
3	Sydney Thunder	14	9	5	0	8	35	0.725	Advanced to play-off phase
4	Adelaide Strikers	14	6	8	0	10	28	0.237	Advanced to play-off phase
5	Hobart Hurricanes	14	7	7	0	6	27	−0.332	Advanced to play-off phase
6	Melbourne Stars	14	7	7	0	5	26	−0.222	
7	Brisbane Heat	14	3	11	0	7	16	−0.910	
8	Melbourne Renegades	14	3	10	1	5	16	−1.477	

Source: ESPNcricinfo
(C) Champions

== Regular season ==
Match 1
5 December 2021
19:15 (N)
Scorecard

(H) Sydney Sixers; 4/213 (20 overs)	v	Melbourne Stars; 61 (11.1 overs)
Josh Philippe 83 (47); Brody Couch 2/36 (3 overs)		Peter Nevill 18 (14); Steve O'Keefe 4/14 (4 overs)

Sydney Sixers won by 152 runs
Sydney Cricket Ground, Sydney
Attendance: 10,013
Umpires: Phillip Gillespie and Michael Graham-Smith
Player of the match: Josh Philippe (Sydney Sixers)

- Melbourne Stars won the toss and elected to field.
- Brody Couch, Sam Elliott and Syed Faridoun (Melbourne Stars) all made their T20 debuts.
- The Sydney Sixers' winning margin of 152 runs was the largest in a BBL match, bettering the previous record of 145 runs which also was set by the Sixers.

Match 4
8 December 2021
18:35 (N)
Scorecard

Sydney Sixers; 9/144 (20 overs)	v	Hobart Hurricanes (H); 8/130 (20 overs)
Moises Henriques 73 (48); Tom Rogers 3/28 (4 overs)		Peter Handscomb 47 (31); Tom Curran 3/27 (4 overs)

Sydney Sixers won by 14 runs
University of Tasmania Stadium, Launceston
Attendance: 3,316
Umpires: Darren Close and Bruce Oxenford
Player of the match: Moises Henriques (Sydney Sixers)

- Hobart Hurricanes won the toss and elected to field.

Match 8
11 December 2021
18:35 (N)
Scorecard

Hobart Hurricanes; 2/213 (20 overs)	v	Sydney Sixers (H); 4/151 (18 overs)
Matthew Wade 93 (46); Tom Curran 1/46 (3 overs)		Josh Philippe 72 (46); Joel Paris 3/35 (4 overs)

Hobart Hurricanes won by 44 runs (DLS method)
Sydney Cricket Ground, Sydney
Attendance: 11,070
Umpires: Michael Graham-Smith and Bruce Oxenford
Player of the match: Matthew Wade (Hobart Hurricanes)

- Hobart Hurricanes won the toss and elected to bat.
- Sydney Sixers were set a revised target of 196 runs from 18 overs due to rain.
- Josh Kann (Hobart Hurricanes) made his T20 debut.
- X-factor subs: Josh Kann (Hobart Hurricanes) replaced Tom Lammonby.

Match 13
15 December 2021
19:15 (N)
Scorecard

(H) Melbourne Stars; 5/177 (20 overs)	v	Sydney Sixers; 3/182 (19.4 overs)
Glenn Maxwell 103 (57); Dan Christian 1/17 (2 overs)		Josh Philippe 99* (61); Brody Couch 1/22 (3 overs)

Sydney Sixers won by 7 wickets
Melbourne Cricket Ground, Melbourne
Attendance: 11,037
Umpires: Shawn Craig and Bruce Oxenford
Player of the match: Josh Phillipe (Sydney Sixers)

- Sydney Sixers won the toss and elected to field.
- X-factor subs: Hayden Kerr (Sydney Sixers) replaced Lloyd Pope.

Match 16
21 December 2021
19:15 (N)
Scorecard

Adelaide Strikers; 8/147 (20 overs)	v	Sydney Sixers (H); 6/150 (19.2 overs)
Thomas Kelly 41 (34); Dan Christian 3/8 (3 overs)		Jordan Silk 36 (24); Rashid Khan 3/20 (4 overs)

Sydney Sixers won by 4 wickets
Sydney Cricket Ground, Sydney
Attendance: 8,359
Umpires: Bruce Oxenford and David Taylor
Player of the match: Sean Abbott (Sydney Sixers)

- Adelaide Strikers won the toss and elected to bat.

Match 20
26 December 2021
18:05 (D/N)
Scorecard

Sydney Sixers; 4/168 (16 overs)	v	Sydney Thunder (H); 142 (15.1 overs)
Daniel Hughes 50 (26); Daniel Sams 2/29 (3 overs)		Jason Sangha 47 (30); Hayden Kerr 3/29 (3 overs)

Sydney Sixers won by 30 runs (DLS method)
Sydney Showground Stadium, Sydney
Attendance: 10,061
Umpires: Greg Davidson and Bruce Oxenford
Player of the match: Dan Christian (Sydney Sixers)

- Sydney Thunder won the toss and elected to field.
- Rain stopped play during Sydney Sixers innings. Sydney Thunder were set a revised target of 173 runs from 16 overs.
- Todd Murphy (Sydney Sixers) made his T20 debut.
- X-factor subs: Mickey Edwards (Sydney Sixers) replaced Todd Murphy.

Match 25
29 December 2021
18:05 (N)
Scorecard

Brisbane Heat; 105 (19.1 overs)	v	Sydney Sixers (H); 8/106 (20 overs)
Jack Wildermuth 27 (26); Sean Abbott 4/31 (4 overs)		Sean Abbott 37* (43); Jack Wildermuth 2/18 (4 overs)

Sydney Sixers won by 2 wickets.
Sydney Cricket Ground, Sydney
Attendance: 11,354
Umpires: Darren Close and Sam Nogajski
Player of the match: Sean Abbott (Sydney Sixers)

- Brisbane Heat won the toss and elected to bat.
- X-factor subs: Jack Wildermuth (Brisbane Heat) replaced Matthew Kuhnemann.

Match 30
1 January 2022
19:30 (N)
Scorecard

Melbourne Renegades	v	Sydney Sixers (H)

No result
Coffs Harbour International Stadium, Coffs Harbour
Attendance: 5,164
Umpires: Phillip Gillespie and David Taylor

- Sydney Sixers won the toss and elected to field.
- No play was possible due to rain.

Match 34
4 January 2022
18:15 (N)
Scorecard

(H) Perth Scorchers; 8/143 (20 overs)	v	Sydney Sixers; 8/133 (20 overs)
Aaron Hardie 45 (24); Hayden Kerr 4/32 (4 overs)		Dan Christian 73 (61); Andrew Tye 3/17 (4 overs)

Perth Scorchers won by 10 runs
Metricon Stadium, Gold Coast
Umpires: Gerard Abood and Troy Penman
Player of the match: Aaron Hardie (Perth Scorchers)

- Perth Scorchers won the toss and elected to bat.

Match 42
9 January 2022
19:15 (N)
Scorecard

(H) Sydney Sixers; 4/151 (20 overs)	v	Perth Scorchers; 5/152 (19 overs)
Dan Christian 35* (20); Ashton Agar 2/23 (4 overs)		Ashton Turner 69 (41); Ben Dwarshuis 2/34 (4 overs)

Perth Scorchers won by 5 wickets
Coffs Harbour International Stadium, Coffs Harbour
Attendance: 7,022
Umpires: Sam Nogajski and Tony Wilds
Player of the match: Ashton Turner (Perth Scorchers)

- Sydney Sixers won the toss and elected to bat.
- Justin Avendano (Sydney Sixers) became the first player to represent multiple clubs in one BBL season, after previously playing for the Melbourne Stars.

Match 45
11 January 2022
19:15 (N)
Scorecard

Sydney Sixers; 6/150 (20 overs)	v	Melbourne Renegades (H); 105 (17 overs)
Moises Henriques 49 (35); Cameron Boyce 2/15 (4 overs)		Shaun Marsh 39 (36); Ben Dwarshuis 5/26 (4 overs)

Sydney Sixers won by 45 runs
GMHBA Stadium, Geelong
Umpires: Michael Graham-Smith and David Taylor
Player of the match: Ben Dwarshuis (Sydney Sixers)

- Sydney Sixers won the toss and elected to bat.
- Ben Dwarshuis (Sydney Sixers) took his maiden five-wicket haul in T20s.

Match 50
15 January 2022
18:40 (N)
Scorecard

(H) Sydney Sixers; 5/197 (20 overs)	v	Sydney Thunder; 9/137 (20 overs)
Daniel Hughes 66 (48); Nathan McAndrew 2/30 (3 overs)		Chris Green 50 (31); Steve O'Keefe 4/18 (4 overs)

Sydney Sixers won by 60 runs
Sydney Cricket Ground, Sydney
Attendance: 20,306
Umpires: Gerard Abood and Phillip Gillespie
Player of the match: Steve O'Keefe (Sydney Sixers)

- Sydney Thunder won the toss and elected to field.

Match 52
17 January 2022
16:35 (D/N)
Scorecard

Sydney Sixers; 7/161 (20 overs)	v	Adelaide Strikers (H); 2/165 (17.3 overs)
Justin Avendano 52 (29); Fawad Ahmed 3/16 (4 overs)		Ian Cockbain 71* (42); Ben Dwarshuis 1/37 (3 overs)

Adelaide Strikers won by 8 wickets
Adelaide Oval, Adelaide
Umpires: Darren Close and Phillip Gillespie
Player of the match: Ian Cockbain (Adelaide Strikers)

- Sydney Sixers won the toss and elected to bat.
- Ben Dwarshuis (Sydney Sixers) took his 100th BBL wicket, becoming the first player to do so whilst representing one team and fifth player overall.

Match 36 (Note: Originally the match was scheduled to be played on 5 January 2022 but was postponed due to COVID-19 cases in Brisbane Heat's squad.)
19 January 2022
12:05
Scorecard

Sydney Sixers; 6/178 (20 overs)	v	Brisbane Heat (H); 8/151 (20 overs)
Daniel Hughes 59 (45); Michael Neser 3/39 (4 overs)		Max Bryant 57 (55); Hayden Kerr 3/23 (4 overs)

Sydney Sixers won by 27 runs
The Gabba, Brisbane
Umpires: Phillip Gillespie and David Taylor
Player of the match: Daniel Hughes (Sydney Sixers)

- Brisbane Heat won the toss and elected to field.
- Chris Lynn (Brisbane Heat) became the first player to score 3,000 runs in the BBL.

== Playoffs ==
Qualifier
22 January 2022
19:15 (N)
Scorecard

(H) Perth Scorchers; 3/189 (20 overs)	v	Sydney Sixers; 141 (19.1 overs)
Josh Inglis 79 (49); Hayden Kerr 2/37 (4 overs)		Ben Dwarshuis 66 (28); Ashton Agar 2/16 (4 overs)

Perth Scorchers won by 48 runs
Marvel Stadium, Melbourne
Umpires: Gerard Abood and Shawn Craig
Player of the match: Josh Inglis (Perth Scorchers)

- Perth Scorchers won by the toss and elected to bat.
- Nicholas Bertus (Sydney Sixers) made his T20 debut.

Challenger
26 January 2022
19:25 (N)
Scorecard

Adelaide Strikers; 4/167 (20 overs)	v	Sydney Sixers (H); 6/170 (20 overs)
Jonathan Wells 62* (47); Sean Abbott 3/27 (4 overs)		Hayden Kerr 98* (58); Harry Conway 2/37 (4 overs)

Sydney Sixers won by 4 wickets
Sydney Cricket Ground, Sydney
Umpires: Donovan Koch and Sam Nogajski
Player of the match: Hayden Kerr (Sydney Sixers)

- Sydney Sixers won the toss and elected to field.
- Jake Carder (Sydney Sixers) made his T20 debut.

Final
28 January 2022
19:40 (N)
Scorecard

(H) Perth Scorchers; 6/171 (20 overs)	v	Sydney Sixers; 92 (16.2 overs)
Laurie Evans 76* (41); Nathan Lyon 2/24 (3 overs)		Daniel Hughes 42 (33); Andrew Tye 3/15 (3 overs)

Perth Scorchers won by 79 runs
Marvel Stadium, Melbourne
Attendance: 10,333
Umpires: Phillip Gillespie and Sam Nogajski
Player of the match: Laurie Evans (Perth Scorchers)

- Sydney Sixers won the toss and elected to field.
- X-factor subs: Justin Avendano (Sydney Sixers) replaced Jackson Bird.

== Squad ==
The squad for the 2021–22 Big Bash League season.

- Players with international caps are listed in **bold**.
- Ages are given as of the first match of the tournament, 5 December 2021

No	Name	Nationality	Date of birth (age)	Batting style	Bowling style	Notes
Batsmen
9	James Vince	England	14 March 1991 (aged 30)	Right-handed	Right-arm medium	Visa contract & International Cap
14	Jordan Silk	Australia	13 April 1992 (aged 29)	Right-handed	Right arm medium	
16	Daniel Hughes	Australia	16 February 1989 (aged 32)	Left-handed	Right arm medium	Vice-captain
18	Jack Edwards	Australia	19 April 2000 (aged 21)	Right-handed	Right arm medium	
All-rounders
21	Moises Henriques	Australia	1 February 1987 (aged 34)	Right-handed	Right-arm medium-fast	Captain & International Cap
26	Carlos Brathwaite	West Indies	18 July 1988 (aged 33)	Right-handed	Right arm fast-medium	Visa contract & International Cap
50	Hayden Kerr	Australia	10 April 1996 (aged 25)	Right-handed	Right arm medium-fast	
54	Dan Christian	Australia	4 May 1983 (aged 38)	Right-handed	Right arm medium-fast	International Cap
77	Sean Abbott	Australia	29 February 1992 (aged 29)	Right-handed	Right-arm fast-medium	International Cap
Wicket-keepers
22	Josh Philippe	Australia	1 June 1997 (aged 24)	Right-handed	Right-arm medium	
Pace bowlers
27	Ben Dwarshuis	Australia	23 June 1994 (aged 27)	Left-handed	Left arm fast-medium	
33	Jackson Bird	Australia	11 December 1986 (aged 34)	Right-handed	Right arm fast-medium	International Cap
59	Tom Curran	England	12 March 1995 (aged 26)	Right-handed	Right-arm fast medium	Visa contract & International Cap
78	Mickey Edwards	Australia	23 December 1994 (aged 26)	Right-handed	Right arm fast-medium	
Spin bowlers
7	Lloyd Pope	Australia	1 December 1999 (aged 22)	Right-handed	Right arm leg break	
46	Ben Manenti	Australia	23 March 1997 (aged 24)	Right-handed	Right arm off break	
67	Nathan Lyon	Australia	20 December 1987 (aged 33)	Right-handed	Right arm off break	International Cap
72	Steve O'Keefe	Australia	9 December 1984 (aged 36)	Right-handed	Slow left arm orthodox	International Cap
