= 2015–16 Sydney Sixers season =

2015-16 season of Australian men's professional cricket team the Sydney Sixers

Sydney Sixers
2015–16 season
- Coach: Greg Shipperd (1st season)
- Captain(s): Moises Henriques
- Home ground: Sydney Cricket Ground, Sydney
- BBL: 8th
- BBL Finals: DNQ
- Leading Run Scorer: Michael Lumb (253)
- Leading Wicket Taker: Sean Abbott (11)
- Highest home attendance: 38,456 vs Thunder (16 January 2016)
- Lowest home attendance: 20,072 vs Hurricanes (20 December 2015)
- Average home attendance: 27,956

The 2015–16 Sydney Sixers season is the club's fifth consecutive season in the Big Bash League (BBL). After losing in the final of the 2014–15 Big Bash League season to Perth Scorchers, the Sixers had originally qualified for the T20 Champions League. However, this tournament was cancelled due to lack of spectator and sponsorship interest. In the BBL, the club finished last during the regular season, recording only two wins from eight matches.

== Players ==
=== Squad ===
Players with international caps are listed in bold.

| No. | Name | Nat | Birth date | Batting style | Bowling style | Notes |
Batsmen
| 41 | **Michael Lumb** | (England) | 12 February 1980 (age 45) | Left-handed | Right arm medium | Overseas player |
| 27 | **Ed Cowan** | (Australia) | 16 June 1982 (age 42) | Left-handed | Right arm leg spin | |
| 49 | **Steve Smith** | (Australia) | 2 June 1989 (age 35) | Right-handed | Right arm leg spin | |
| 53 | **Nic Maddinson** | (Australia) | 21 December 1991 (age 33) | Left-handed | Left arm orthodox | |
| 14 | Jordan Silk | (Australia) | 13 April 1992 (age 32) | Right-handed | – | |
| 36 | Nick Larkin | (Australia) | 1 May 1990 (age 34) | Right-handed | – | Injury replacement player |
All-rounders
| 21 | **Moises Henriques** | (Australia) | 1 February 1987 (age 38) | Right-handed | Right arm fast medium | Captain |
| 22 | **Johan Botha** | (South Africa) | 2 May 1982 (age 42) | Right-handed | Right arm off spin | Overseas player |
| 72 | **Stephen O'Keefe** | (Australia) | 9 December 1984 (age 40) | Right-handed | Left arm orthodox | |
| 77 | **Sean Abbott** | (Australia) | 29 February 1992 (age 33) | Right-handed | Right arm fast medium | |
| 23 | Ben Dwarshuis | (Australia) | 23 June 1994 (age 30) | Left-handed | Left arm fast medium | |
| 37 | Trent Lawford | (Australia) | 18 April 1988 (age 36) | Right-handed | Right arm fast medium | |
Wicket-keepers
| 24 | **Brad Haddin** | (Australia) | 23 October 1977 (age 47) | Right-handed | – | |
| 1 | Ryan Carters | (Australia) | 25 July 1990 (age 34) | Right-handed | – | |
Bowlers
| 56 | **Mitchell Starc** | (Australia) | 30 January 1990 (age 35) | Left-handed | Left-arm fast | |
| 8 | **Josh Hazlewood** | (Australia) | 8 January 1991 (age 34) | Left-handed | Right arm fast medium | |
| 4 | **Doug Bollinger** | (Australia) | 24 July 1981 (age 43) | Left-handed | Left arm fast medium | |
| 33 | **Jackson Bird** | (Australia) | 11 December 1986 (age 38) | Right-handed | Right arm fast medium | |
| 79 | Mickey Edwards | (Australia) | unknown | Right-handed | Right arm fast medium | |
| 67 | **Nathan Lyon** | (Australia) | 20 November 1987 (age 37) | Right-handed | Right arm off spin | |
| 5 | **Riley Ayre** | (Australia) | 2 April 1996 (age 28) | Right-handed | Right arm off spin | Rookie. Replacement player for Nathan Lyon. |
| | **Soumil Chhibber** | (Australia) | 16 June 1995 (age 29) | Right-handed | Right arm off spin | Development Rookie |
| 88 | **Li Kai Ming** | (Hong Kong) | 5 July 1991 (age 33) | Right-handed | Right arm leg spin | Community Rookie |

== Big Bash League ==
=== Ladder ===
| Pos | Team | Pld | W | L | NR | Pts | NRR | Qualification |
|---|---|---|---|---|---|---|---|---|
| 1 | Adelaide Strikers | 8 | 7 | 1 | 0 | 14 | 0.544 | Advanced to semi-finals |
| 2 | Melbourne Stars | 8 | 5 | 3 | 0 | 10 | 0.366 | Advanced to semi-finals |
| 3 | Perth Scorchers | 8 | 5 | 3 | 0 | 10 | 0.181 | Advanced to semi-finals |
| 4 | Sydney Thunder (C) | 8 | 4 | 4 | 0 | 8 | 0.375 | Advanced to semi-finals |
| 5 | Melbourne Renegades | 8 | 3 | 5 | 0 | 6 | −0.041 | |
| 6 | Brisbane Heat | 8 | 3 | 5 | 0 | 6 | −0.204 | |
| 7 | Hobart Hurricanes | 8 | 3 | 5 | 0 | 6 | −0.955 | |
| 8 | Sydney Sixers | 8 | 2 | 6 | 0 | 4 | −0.330 | |

(C) Champions

=== Results by round ===
| Round | 1 | 2 | 3 | 4 | 5 | 6 | 7 | 8 |
|---|---|---|---|---|---|---|---|---|
| Ground | A | H | A | H | A | A | H | H |
| Result | L | W | W | L | L | L | L | L |
| Position | 8 | 3 | 3 | 4 | 5 | 7 | 8 | 8 |

Updated to match(es) played on 16 January 2016. Source: bigbash.com.au
A = Away; H = Home; W = Win; D = Draw; L = Loss

=== Matches ===
| 17 December | (H) Sydney Thunder; 4/158 (20 overs) | v | Sydney Sixers; 122 (19.5 overs) | Sydney Thunder won by 36 runs |
| 19:40 (D/N); Scorecard | (H) Sydney Thunder; 4/158 (20 overs) | v | Sydney Sixers; 122 (19.5 overs) | Spotless Stadium; Attendance: 18,287; Umpires: Geoff Joshua and Paul Wilson; Player of the match: Michael Hussey (Thunder) |
| 19:40 (D/N); Scorecard | Michael Hussey 80* (59); Trent Lawford 1/12 (2 overs) | | Michael Lumb 34 (27); Andre Russell 3/13 (4 overs) | Spotless Stadium; Attendance: 18,287; Umpires: Geoff Joshua and Paul Wilson; Player of the match: Michael Hussey (Thunder) |
| Sydney Thunder won the toss and elected to bat. | | | | Spotless Stadium; Attendance: 18,287; Umpires: Geoff Joshua and Paul Wilson; Player of the match: Michael Hussey (Thunder) |

| 20 December | (H) Sydney Sixers; 7/186 (20 overs) | v | Hobart Hurricanes; 91 (15.5 overs) | Sydney Sixers won by 95 runs |
| 16:20 (D/N); Scorecard | (H) Sydney Sixers; 7/186 (20 overs) | v | Hobart Hurricanes; 91 (15.5 overs) | Sydney Cricket Ground; Attendance: 20,072; Umpires: Simon Fry and Phillip Gillespie; Player of the match: Brad Haddin (Sixers) |
| 16:20 (D/N); Scorecard | Brad Haddin 72 (45); Cameron Boyce 2/25 (4 overs) | | George Bailey 62* (45); Nathan Lyon 5/23 (3.5 overs) | Sydney Cricket Ground; Attendance: 20,072; Umpires: Simon Fry and Phillip Gillespie; Player of the match: Brad Haddin (Sixers) |
| Sydney Sixers won the toss and elected to bat.; Sam Rainbird (Hurricanes) made his T20 debut. | | | | Sydney Cricket Ground; Attendance: 20,072; Umpires: Simon Fry and Phillip Gillespie; Player of the match: Brad Haddin (Sixers) |

| 23 December | (H) Melbourne Renegades; 4/172 (20 overs) | v | Sydney Sixers; 7/174 (18.5 overs) | Sydney Sixers won by 3 wickets |
| 19:10 (D/N); Scorecard | (H) Melbourne Renegades; 4/172 (20 overs) | v | Sydney Sixers; 7/174 (18.5 overs) | Etihad Stadium; Attendance: 20,850; Umpires: Simon Fry and Sam Nogajski; Player of the match: Michael Lumb (Sixers) |
| 19:10 (D/N); Scorecard | Chris Gayle 46 (33); Johan Botha 1/13 (2 overs) | | Michael Lumb 63 (35); Nathan Rimmington 4/26 (4 overs) | Etihad Stadium; Attendance: 20,850; Umpires: Simon Fry and Sam Nogajski; Player of the match: Michael Lumb (Sixers) |
| Sydney Sixers won the toss and elected to field.; Cameron Stevenson (Renegades) made his T20 debut. | | | | Etihad Stadium; Attendance: 20,850; Umpires: Simon Fry and Sam Nogajski; Player of the match: Michael Lumb (Sixers) |

| 27 December | (H) Sydney Sixers; 6/139 (20 overs) | v | Melbourne Stars; 5/143 (18.4 overs) | Melbourne Stars won by 5 wickets |
| 19:10 (D/N); Scorecard | (H) Sydney Sixers; 6/139 (20 overs) | v | Melbourne Stars; 5/143 (18.4 overs) | Sydney Cricket Ground; Attendance: 29,104; Umpires: Geoff Joshua and Sam Nogaski; Player of the match: Glenn Maxwell (Stars) |
| 19:10 (D/N); Scorecard | Moisés Henriques 41* (34); Ben Hilfenhaus 2/25 (3 overs) | | Peter Handscomb 52 (40); Doug Bollinger 2/31 (3.4 overs) | Sydney Cricket Ground; Attendance: 29,104; Umpires: Geoff Joshua and Sam Nogaski; Player of the match: Glenn Maxwell (Stars) |
| Sydney Sixers won the toss and elected to bat.; The crowd of 29,104 is the highest crowd at the SCG for a non-derby BBL match. | | | | Sydney Cricket Ground; Attendance: 29,104; Umpires: Geoff Joshua and Sam Nogaski; Player of the match: Glenn Maxwell (Stars) |

| 31 December | Sydney Sixers; 5/176 (20 overs) | v | Adelaide Strikers (H); 5/182 (19.3 overs) | Adelaide Strikers won by 5 wickets |
| 18:40 (D/N); Scorecard | Sydney Sixers; 5/176 (20 overs) | v | Adelaide Strikers (H); 5/182 (19.3 overs) | Adelaide Oval; Attendance: 46,389; Umpires: Simon Fry and Paul Wilson; Player of the match: Travis Head (Strikers) |
| 18:40 (D/N); Scorecard | Brad Haddin 54* (35); Adil Rashid 3/34 (4 overs) | | Travis Head 101* (53); Ben Dwarshuis 3/25 (4 overs) | Adelaide Oval; Attendance: 46,389; Umpires: Simon Fry and Paul Wilson; Player of the match: Travis Head (Strikers) |
| Adelaide Strikers won the toss and elected to field.; Hamish Kingston (Strikers) made his T20 debut. | | | | Adelaide Oval; Attendance: 46,389; Umpires: Simon Fry and Paul Wilson; Player of the match: Travis Head (Strikers) |

| 2 January | Sydney Sixers; 8/112 (20 overs) | v | Perth Scorchers (H); 1/114 (14.3 overs) | Perth Scorchers won by 9 wickets |
| 18:15 (D/N); Scorecard | Sydney Sixers; 8/112 (20 overs) | v | Perth Scorchers (H); 1/114 (14.3 overs) | #TheFurnace; Attendance: 20,444; Umpires: Ashley Barrow and Paul Wilson; Player of the match: David Willey (Scorchers) |
| 18:15 (D/N); Scorecard | Michael Lumb 47 (45); David Willey 3/22 (4 overs) | | Shaun Marsh 63* (54); Sean Abbott 1/11 (1 over) | #TheFurnace; Attendance: 20,444; Umpires: Ashley Barrow and Paul Wilson; Player of the match: David Willey (Scorchers) |
| Sydney Sixers won the toss and elected to bat.; William Somerville (Sixers) made his T20 debut. | | | | #TheFurnace; Attendance: 20,444; Umpires: Ashley Barrow and Paul Wilson; Player of the match: David Willey (Scorchers) |

| 10 January | Brisbane Heat; 8/162 (20 overs) | v | Sydney Sixers (H); 8/156 (20 overs) | Brisbane Heat won by 6 runs |
| 19:25 (D/N); Scorecard | Brisbane Heat; 8/162 (20 overs) | v | Sydney Sixers (H); 8/156 (20 overs) | Sydney Cricket Ground; Attendance: 24,192; Umpires: Phillip Gillespie and Michael Graham-Smith; Player of the match: Joe Burns (Heat) |
| 19:25 (D/N); Scorecard | Joe Burns 60 (51); Sean Abbott 3/8 (2 overs) | | Michael Lumb 47 (38); Mitchell Swepson 2/26 (3 overs) | Sydney Cricket Ground; Attendance: 24,192; Umpires: Phillip Gillespie and Michael Graham-Smith; Player of the match: Joe Burns (Heat) |
| Brisbane Heat won the toss and elected to bat.; Nick Larkin (Sixers) and Mitchell Swepson (Heat) both made their T20 debuts. | | | | Sydney Cricket Ground; Attendance: 24,192; Umpires: Phillip Gillespie and Michael Graham-Smith; Player of the match: Joe Burns (Heat) |

| 16 January | Sydney Thunder; 5/202 (20 overs) | v | Sydney Sixers (H); 156 (17.3 overs) | Sydney Thunder won by 46 runs |
| 18:10 (D/N); Scorecard | Sydney Thunder; 5/202 (20 overs) | v | Sydney Sixers (H); 156 (17.3 overs) | Sydney Cricket Ground; Attendance: 38,456; Umpires: Gerard Abood and John Ward; Player of the match: Shane Watson (Thunder) |
| 18:10 (D/N); Scorecard | Shane Watson 66 (41); Sean Abbott 2/41 (4 overs) | | Nic Maddinson 70 (40); Clint McKay 3/16 (2.3 overs) | Sydney Cricket Ground; Attendance: 38,456; Umpires: Gerard Abood and John Ward; Player of the match: Shane Watson (Thunder) |
| Sydney Sixers won the toss and elected to field.; Nathan McAndrew (Thunder) made his T20 debut.; The crowd of 38,456 is the highest crowd for a domestic cricket game in New South Wales. | | | | Sydney Cricket Ground; Attendance: 38,456; Umpires: Gerard Abood and John Ward; Player of the match: Shane Watson (Thunder) |

== Home attendance ==
| Game | Opponent | Attendance |
|---|---|---|
| 4 | Hobart Hurricanes | 20,072 |
| 10 | Melbourne Stars | 29,104 |
| 26 | Brisbane Heat | 24,192 |
| 30 | Sydney Thunder | 38,456 |
| Total Attendance | | 111,824 |
| Average Attendance | | 27,956 |
