= 2013–14 Sydney Sixers season =

Sydney Sixers
2012–13 season
- Coach: Trevor Bayliss (3rd season)
- Captain(s): Brad Haddin (3rd season)
- Home ground: Sydney Cricket Ground, Sydney
- CLT20: DNQ
- Big Bash League: 2nd
- BBL Finals: Semi-finalist
- Player of the Season: Nic Maddinson

The 2013–14 Sydney Sixers season was the club's third consecutive season in the Big Bash League (BBL).

== Players ==
=== Squad ===
Players with international caps are listed in bold.

No.	Name	Nat	Birth date	Batting style	Bowling style	Notes
Batsmen
45	**Michael Lumb**	(England)	12 February 1980 (age 46)	Left-handed	Right arm medium	Overseas player
53	**Nic Maddinson**	(Australia)	21 December 1991 (age 34)	Left-handed	Left arm orthodox	
14	Jordan Silk	(Australia)	13 April 1992 (age 34)	Right-handed	-	
All-rounders
-	Sean Abbott	(Australia)	29 February 1992 (age 34)	Right-handed	Right arm fast medium	
10	**Ravi Bopara**	(England)	4 May 1985 (age 41)	Right-handed	Right arm medium	Overseas player
21	**Moisés Henriques**	(Australia)	1 February 1987 (age 39)	Right-handed	Right arm fast medium	
72	**Stephen O'Keefe**	(Australia)	9 December 1984 (age 41)	Right-handed	Left arm orthodox	
49	**Steve Smith**	(Australia)	2 June 1989 (age 37)	Right-handed	Right arm leg spin	
26	**Marcus North**	(Australia)	28 July 1979 (age 47)	Left-handed	Right arm off spin	
99	**Mark Cosgrove**	(Australia)	14 June 1984 (age 42)	Left-handed	Right arm medium	
-	Ben Dwarshuis	(Australia)	23 June 1994 (age 32)	Left-handed	Left arm fast medium	
-	**Charles Amini**	(Papua New Guinea)	14 April 1992 (age 34)	Left-handed	Right arm leg spin	Rookie contract
Wicketkeepers
24	**Brad Haddin**	(Australia)	23 October 1977 (age 48)	Right-handed	–	Captain
13	Daniel Smith	(Australia)	17 March 1982 (age 44)	Right-handed	–	
Pace bowlers
9	**Trent Copeland**	(Australia)	14 March 1986 (age 40)	Right-handed	Right arm fast medium	
8	**Josh Hazlewood**	(Australia)	8 January 1991 (age 35)	Left-handed	Right arm fast medium	
58	**Brett Lee**	(Australia)	8 November 1976 (age 49)	Right-handed	Right arm fast	
56	**Mitchell Starc**	(Australia)	30 January 1990 (age 36)	Left-handed	Left-arm fast medium	
33	**Chris Tremlett**	(England)	2 September 1981 (age 44)	Right-handed	Right arm fast medium	Overseas Player
2	Josh Lalor	(Australia)	2 November 1987 (age 38)	Right-handed	Left arm fast medium	
Spin bowlers
67	**Nathan Lyon**	(Australia)	20 November 1987 (age 38)	Right-handed	Right arm off spin	
-	Shane Cassel	(Australia)	15 September 1993 (age 32)	Left-handed	Right arm leg spin	Rookie contract

=== Transfers ===
In:

Nat	Name	Role	Previous team
(Australia)	Jordan Silk	Batsmen	New player
(Australia)	Sean Abbott	All-rounder	Sydney Thunder
(England)	Ravi Bopara	All-rounder	New to BBL
(Australia)	Marcus North	Batsmen	Perth Scorchers
(Australia)	Mark Cosgrove	Batsmen	Sydney Thunder
(Australia)	Ben Dwarshuis	All-rounder	New player
(Australia)	Charles Amini	All-rounder	New player
(Australia)	Trent Copeland	Bowler	Sydney Thunder
(England)	Chris Tremlett	Bowler	New to BBL
(Australia)	Nathan Lyon	Bowler	Adelaide Strikers
(Australia)	Shane Cassel	Bowler	New player

Out:

Nat	Name	Role	Going to
(Australia)	Daniel Hughes	Batsmen	Sydney Thunder
(Australia)	David Warner	Batsmen	Sydney Thunder
(Australia)	Kurtis Patterson	Batsmen	Sydney Thunder
(Sri Lanka)	Jeevan Mendis	All-rounder	Uncontracted in BBL
(Australia)	Ian Moran	All-rounder	Not re-signed
(Australia)	Dominic Thornely	All-rounder	Not re-signed
(Australia)	Luke Feldmen	Bowler	Not re-signed
(Trinidad and Tobago)	Sunil Narine	All-rounder	Not re-signed

== Review ==
Sydney Sixers were much improved from the previous season's disappointing result. The club registered six wins from the eight in the group stage to qualify for the finals series. However, they lost in the semi-final against Perth Scorchers.

The first match of the campaign began against cross-town rivals Sydney Thunder at home (Sydney Cricket Ground). Sixers won the toss, electing to field. They were able to restrict the Thunder to 166 runs, with Usman Khawaja scoring 66. Sixers chased down the runs with 10 balls to spare. Player of the Match, Nic Maddinson expertly guided the Sixers to victory with 61 runs.

The second match was a very lopsided encounter. After sending the Melbourne Stars in, the Sixers were unable to restrict their opponents total effectively. The Stars scored 200 runs which proved very difficult to chase down. The Sixers ended with a total of 9/123 by the end of the allotted 20 overs.

The Sixers went on a two-game winning streak, defeating Brisbane Heat and Adelaide Strikers on the road. After losing both tosses, the Sixers were able to firstly restrict the Heat to 7/136 when chasing the 140 runs posted by the Sixers, and then successfully chase down the Strikers 7/149 with 5 balls to spare.

The Sixers fifth match of the tournament proved to be one of the most exciting in BBL03, with the game going to a super over. However it was not meant to be for the Sixers. The club lost this game in heartbreaking fashion after only being able to conjure up one run from their super over. Scorchers all rounder Adam Voges picked off the run with a boundary from the first ball of Brett Lee's super over. The game itself was a thrilling one for the spectators with many twists and turns. The Scorchers began proceedings horrifically losing two wickets without score from the first over of the game by Brett Lee. A superb 129 run partnership between Simon Katich and Sam Whiteman steadied the ship before Whiteman was eventually bowled by Lee in the eighteenth over. Voges then guided the Scorchers to a total of 153. In reply, the Sixers had trouble of their own keeping wickets in hand. With regular opener Michael Lumb out for the game, Stephen O'Keefe partnered Nic Maddinson at the top of the order. Both looked to move the scores on but fell cheaply. Then when Moises Henriques and Marcus North both returned to the pavilion without troubling the scorers the Sixers were 4/20. Scorchers bowler Tim Behrendorff was the destroyer with 3/21 from his four overs. Steve Smith and Jordan Silk did some rebuilding of their own before Silk gifted Voges an easy return catch. Smith continued scoring runs and looked in fine form as he reached his half century. The Sixers seemed like they would now easily make the runs. However, the game turned on its head once more when Dan Smith attempted to play a reverse sweep only to scoop the ball to fine leg. With the Scorchers eyeing off the Sixers tail-enders, Steve Smith took it upon himself to finish the game. A mistimed shot of the bowling of Yasir Arafat saw him caught at short third man by Voges with the Sixers 7/131. Lyon quickly departed and the Scorchers looked destined to win. However, the nineteenth over by Thomas saw some big hitting by Lee and Chris Tremlett leaving the Sixers with just 7 runs of the final over by Arafat to win. Neither side could quite find the slice of luck to get the win in ordinary time. With Lee out bowled, Tremlett faced the final delivery needing two runs to win. He dug out the ball from Arafat who couldn't quite hold onto out bumping it out to cover. The Sixers scampered through for a single leaving the scores tied. The Sixers super over was disastrous as Steve Smith was out bowled from the first ball attempting a low-percentage lap sweep. Henriques soon followed caught in the gully region for a pair of ducks for the night. Their super over ended at 2/1 from four balls. The one run scored by Maddinson was easily surpassed by the Scorchers as Voges flicked Lee's first ball through the leg side for a boundary.

The Sixers then returned to the winners circle, going on a three-game streak. They defeated Hobart Hurricanes at home, Melbourne Renegades at Docklands Stadium and Sydney Thunder at Stadium Australia on their way to finishing second on the ladder.

In a rain-affected final against soon-becoming-rival Perth Scorchers, the Scorchers fell 6 runs short of the 54-run target set by Scorchers according to the Duckworth–Lewis method. The semi-finals loss saw them bow out of the tournament. The result means they did not qualify for the 2014 Champions League Twenty20 tournament.

== Champions League Twenty20 ==
As the Sydney Sixers finished seventh in the 2012–13 Big Bash League season, they did not qualify for the 2013 Champions League Twenty20 tournament. This means they are unable to defend their title that they won in 2012.

== Big Bash League ==
=== Regular season ===
==== Ladder ====
Pos	Team	Pld	W	L	NR	Pts	NRR	Qualification
1	Melbourne Stars	8	8	0	0	16	2.189	Advanced to semi-finals
2	Sydney Sixers	8	6	2	0	12	−0.218	Advanced to semi-finals
3	Perth Scorchers (C)	8	5	3	0	10	−0.064	Advanced to semi-finals
4	Hobart Hurricanes	8	3	4	1	7	0.321	Advanced to semi-finals
5	Brisbane Heat	8	3	5	0	6	−0.197	
6	Melbourne Renegades	8	3	5	0	6	−0.475	
7	Adelaide Strikers	8	2	5	1	5	−0.933	
8	Sydney Thunder	8	1	7	0	2	−0.654	

(C) Champions

==== Matches ====
21 December	Sydney Thunder; 6/166 (20 overs)	v	Sydney Sixers (H); 4/167 (18.2 overs)	Sydney Sixers won by 6 wickets
19:10 (D/N); Scorecard	Sydney Thunder; 6/166 (20 overs)	v	Sydney Sixers (H); 4/167 (18.2 overs)	Sydney Cricket Ground; Attendance: 18,180; Umpires: Gerard Abood and Ashley Barrow; Player of the match: Nic Maddinson (Sixers)
19:10 (D/N); Scorecard	Usman Khawaja 66 (51); Moisés Henriques 2/24 (4 overs)		Nic Maddinson 61 (40); Carl Sandri 1/20 (2 overs)	Sydney Cricket Ground; Attendance: 18,180; Umpires: Gerard Abood and Ashley Barrow; Player of the match: Nic Maddinson (Sixers)
Sydney Sixers won the toss and elected to field.				Sydney Cricket Ground; Attendance: 18,180; Umpires: Gerard Abood and Ashley Barrow; Player of the match: Nic Maddinson (Sixers)

29 December	Melbourne Stars; 5/200 (20 overs)	v	Sydney Sixers (H); 9/123 (20 overs)	Melbourne Stars won by 77 runs
19:10 (D/N); Scorecard	Melbourne Stars; 5/200 (20 overs)	v	Sydney Sixers (H); 9/123 (20 overs)	Sydney Cricket Ground, Sydney; Attendance: 20,368; Umpires: Ashley Barrow and Michael Graham-Smith; Player of the match: Glenn Maxwell (Stars)
19:10 (D/N); Scorecard	David Hussey 50* (41); Josh Hazlewood 3/20 (4 overs)		Michael Lumb 29 (19); Glenn Maxwell 3/26 (4 overs)	Sydney Cricket Ground, Sydney; Attendance: 20,368; Umpires: Ashley Barrow and Michael Graham-Smith; Player of the match: Glenn Maxwell (Stars)
Sydney Sixers won the toss and elected to field.				Sydney Cricket Ground, Sydney; Attendance: 20,368; Umpires: Ashley Barrow and Michael Graham-Smith; Player of the match: Glenn Maxwell (Stars)

2 January	Sydney Sixers; 8/140 (20 overs)	v	Brisbane Heat (H); 7/136 (20 overs)	Sydney Sixers won by 4 runs
18:40 (D/N); Scorecard	Sydney Sixers; 8/140 (20 overs)	v	Brisbane Heat (H); 7/136 (20 overs)	Brisbane Cricket Ground, Woolloongabba, Brisbane; Attendance: 22,324; Umpires: Ashley Barrow and John Ward; Player of the match: Brett Lee (Sixers)
18:40 (D/N); Scorecard	Michael Lumb 56 (42); Cameron Gannon 4/24 (4 overs)		Craig Kieswetter 38 (40); Brett Lee 2/22 (4 overs)	Brisbane Cricket Ground, Woolloongabba, Brisbane; Attendance: 22,324; Umpires: Ashley Barrow and John Ward; Player of the match: Brett Lee (Sixers)
Brisbane Heat won the toss and elected to field.; Mark Steketee made his T20 debut for Brisbane Heat.				Brisbane Cricket Ground, Woolloongabba, Brisbane; Attendance: 22,324; Umpires: Ashley Barrow and John Ward; Player of the match: Brett Lee (Sixers)

5 January	(H) Adelaide Strikers; 7/149 (20 overs)	v	Sydney Sixers; 4/150 (19.1 overs)	Sydney Sixers won by 6 wickets
19:40 (D/N); Scorecard	(H) Adelaide Strikers; 7/149 (20 overs)	v	Sydney Sixers; 4/150 (19.1 overs)	Adelaide Oval, Adelaide; Attendance: 26,506; Umpires: Simon Fry and Sam Nogajski; Player of the match: Michael Lumb (Sixers)
19:40 (D/N); Scorecard	Shakib Al Hasan 46 (30); Josh Hazlewood 3/16 (4 overs)		Michael Lumb 54 (41); Shakib Al Hasan 2/21 (4 overs)	Adelaide Oval, Adelaide; Attendance: 26,506; Umpires: Simon Fry and Sam Nogajski; Player of the match: Michael Lumb (Sixers)
Adelaide Strikers won the toss and elected to bat.				Adelaide Oval, Adelaide; Attendance: 26,506; Umpires: Simon Fry and Sam Nogajski; Player of the match: Michael Lumb (Sixers)

10 January	Perth Scorchers; 5/153 (20 overs)	v	Sydney Sixers (H); 9/153 (20 overs)	Scores level; Perth Scorchers won the Super Over
19:40 (D/N); Scorecard	Perth Scorchers; 5/153 (20 overs)	v	Sydney Sixers (H); 9/153 (20 overs)	Sydney Cricket Ground; Umpires: Gerard Abood (Aus) and Simon Fry (Aus)
19:40 (D/N); Scorecard	Simon Katich 71 (56); Brett Lee 4/28 (4 overs)		Steve Smith 65 (48); Yasir Arafat 4/24 (4 overs)	Sydney Cricket Ground; Umpires: Gerard Abood (Aus) and Simon Fry (Aus)
Perth Scorchers won the toss and elected to bat.				Sydney Cricket Ground; Umpires: Gerard Abood (Aus) and Simon Fry (Aus)

15 January	(H) Sydney Sixers; 6/179 (20 overs)	v	Hobart Hurricanes; 8/172 (20 overs)	Sydney Sixers won by 7 runs
19:40 (D/N); Scorecard	(H) Sydney Sixers; 6/179 (20 overs)	v	Hobart Hurricanes; 8/172 (20 overs)	Sydney Cricket Ground; Attendance: 17,264; Umpires: Michael Graham-Smith and Paul Wilson; Player of the match: Steve Smith
19:40 (D/N); Scorecard	Steve Smith 52 (32); Ben Hilfenhaus 2/25 (4 overs)		Tim Paine 57 (30); Josh Hazlewood 2/25 (3 overs)	Sydney Cricket Ground; Attendance: 17,264; Umpires: Michael Graham-Smith and Paul Wilson; Player of the match: Steve Smith
Sydney Sixers won the toss and elected to bat				Sydney Cricket Ground; Attendance: 17,264; Umpires: Michael Graham-Smith and Paul Wilson; Player of the match: Steve Smith

18 January	Sydney Sixers; 6/151 (20 overs)	v	Melbourne Renegades (H); 5/149 (20 overs)	Sydney Sixers won by 2 runs
19:40 (D/N); Scorecard	Sydney Sixers; 6/151 (20 overs)	v	Melbourne Renegades (H); 5/149 (20 overs)	Docklands Stadium, Melbourne; Attendance: 14,152; Umpires: Damien Mealey and Tony Ward; Player of the match: Moisés Henriques (Sixers)
19:40 (D/N); Scorecard	Moisés Henriques 55 (39); Nathan Rimmington 2/35 (4 overs)		Dwayne Bravo 38 (30); Josh Hazlewood 1/22 (4 overs)	Docklands Stadium, Melbourne; Attendance: 14,152; Umpires: Damien Mealey and Tony Ward; Player of the match: Moisés Henriques (Sixers)
Melbourne Renegades won the toss and elected to field				Docklands Stadium, Melbourne; Attendance: 14,152; Umpires: Damien Mealey and Tony Ward; Player of the match: Moisés Henriques (Sixers)

25 January	(H) Sydney Thunder; 6/128 (20 overs)	v	Sydney Sixers; 2/131 (19.2 overs)	Sydney Sixers won by 8 wickets
19:10 (D/N); Scorecard	(H) Sydney Thunder; 6/128 (20 overs)	v	Sydney Sixers; 2/131 (19.2 overs)	Stadium Australia, Sydney; Attendance: 25,726; Umpires: Ashley Barrow and Damien Mealey; Player of the match: Nathan Lyon (Sixers)
19:10 (D/N); Scorecard	Daniel Hughes 32 (33); Nathan Lyon 3/14 (4 overs)		Nic Maddinson 59* (56); Chris Tremain 1/14 (3 overs)	Stadium Australia, Sydney; Attendance: 25,726; Umpires: Ashley Barrow and Damien Mealey; Player of the match: Nathan Lyon (Sixers)
Sydney Sixers won the toss and elected to field.				Stadium Australia, Sydney; Attendance: 25,726; Umpires: Ashley Barrow and Damien Mealey; Player of the match: Nathan Lyon (Sixers)

=== Finals ===
Semifinals
1	Melbourne Stars (H)	8/141 (20 ovs)
4	Hobart Hurricanes	3/142 (18.1 ovs)
3	Perth Scorchers (D/L)	5/193 (20 ovs)
2	Sydney Sixers (H)	6/48 (5 ovs)

Final
3	Perth Scorchers (H)	4/191 (20 ovs)
4	Hobart Hurricanes	7/152 (20 ovs)

5 February	Perth Scorchers; 5/193 (20 overs)	v	Sydney Sixers (H); 6/48 (5 overs)	Perth Scorchers won by 5 runs (D/L)
19:45 (D/N) Semi-final Scorecard	Perth Scorchers; 5/193 (20 overs)	v	Sydney Sixers (H); 6/48 (5 overs)	Sydney Cricket Ground; Attendance: 12,570; Umpires: Mick Martell and Paul Wilson; Player of the match: Craig Simmons (Scorchers)
19:45 (D/N) Semi-final Scorecard	Craig Simmons 112 (58); Mitchell Starc 2/37 (4 overs)		Nic Maddinson 36 (16); Jason Behrendorff 2/5 (1 over)	Sydney Cricket Ground; Attendance: 12,570; Umpires: Mick Martell and Paul Wilson; Player of the match: Craig Simmons (Scorchers)
Sydney Sixers won the toss and elected to field.; Rain during the innings break reduced the Sixers' target to 54 runs from 5 overs according to the Duckworth–Lewis method.				Sydney Cricket Ground; Attendance: 12,570; Umpires: Mick Martell and Paul Wilson; Player of the match: Craig Simmons (Scorchers)
