= Sydney Sixers =

Australian men's franchise cricket team

- Nicknames: Sixers; 6ers
- League: Big Bash League

Personnel
- Captain: TBA
- Coach: Matthew Mott
- Owner: Cricket New South Wales

Team information
- City: Sydney, New South Wales
- Colours: Pink
- Founded: 2011; 15 years ago
- Home ground: Sydney Cricket Ground
- Capacity: 48,000

History
- Big Bash League wins: 3 (BBL |01, BBL |09, BBL |10)
- Champions League wins: 1 (2012)
- Official website: sydneysixers.com.au
Home kit
Away kit

Season
- • 2011–12 • 2012–13 • 2013–14 • 2014–15 • 2015–16 • 2016–17 • 2017–18 • 2018–19 • 2019–20 • 2020–21 • 2021–22 • 2022–23 • 2023–24 • 2024–25 • 2025–26 • 2026–27

The Sydney Sixers, stylised as the Sydney 6ers, are an Australian men's professional franchise cricket team that compete in Australia's domestic Twenty20 (T20) cricket competition, the Big Bash League (BBL). Along with the Sydney Thunder, their competition rivals, the Sixers are the successors of the New South Wales Blues who played in the now-defunct KFC Twenty20 Big Bash. The Sixers play at the Sydney Cricket Ground (SCG) in Moore Park. The team's inaugural coach was Trevor Bayliss, who was replaced in 2015 by current coach Greg Shipperd. Since the inaugural 2011–12 Big Bash League season, the Sixers have won three titles and appeared in seven finals.

== History ==
=== Foundation ===
The Sydney Sixers were created when the decision was made to move away from state representative teams to city-based teams for the domestic Twenty20 competition. It is believed that this move was to align its structure with that of India and South Africa, where domestic teams are based around cities. This was an important factor for the ongoing Champions League Twenty20 tournament, as those three nations were founding members. It was decided that there would be two teams from Sydney, two teams from Melbourne, and one from each other capital city for an eight team competition. The names Sixers (and Thunder for cross-city rivals) were decided upon by Cricket NSW. Other names considered for the two teams were Rocks and Edge.

=== 2011–2012: BBL01 ===
==== Regular season ====
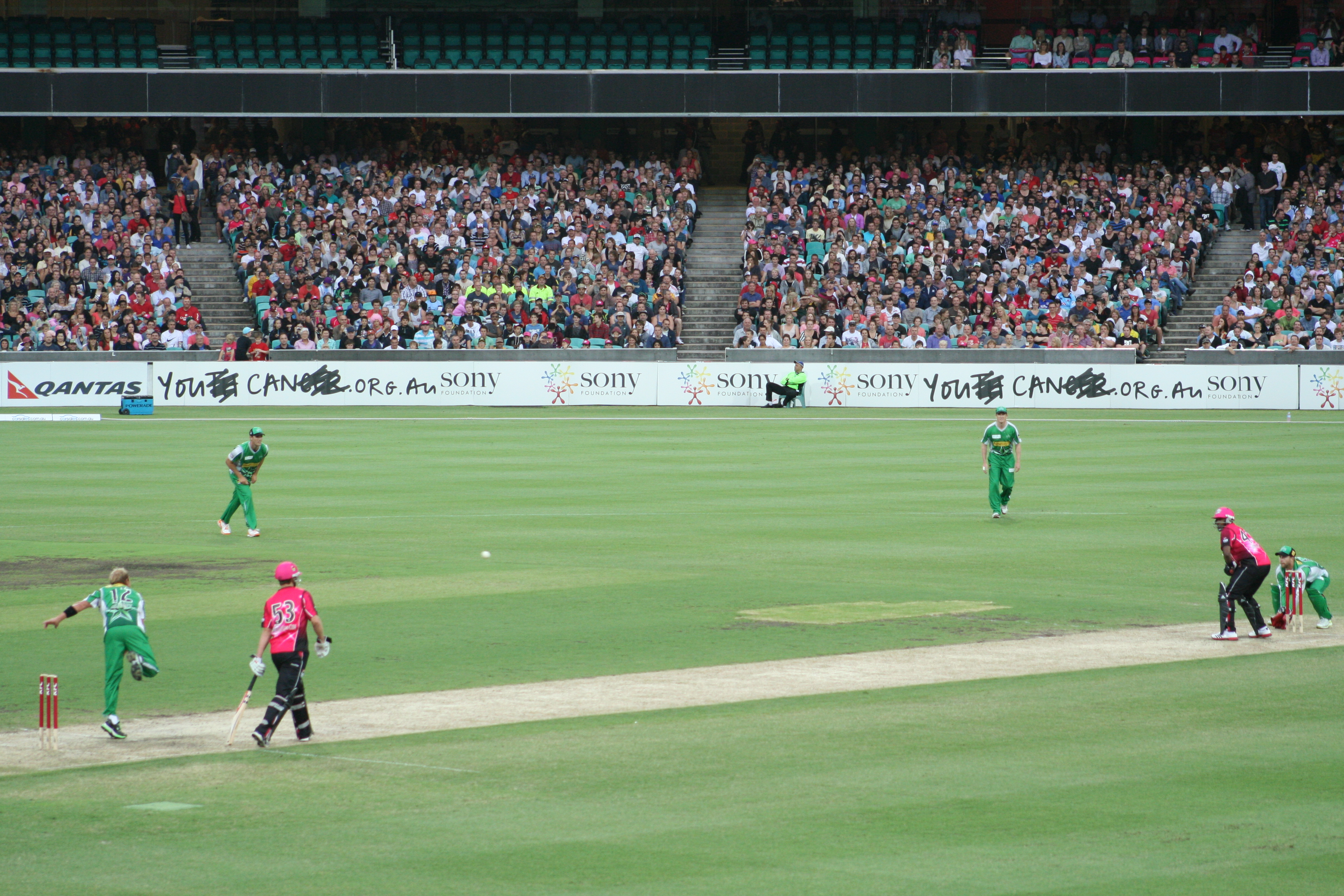
Shane Warne bowling against Sydney Sixers in 2011 at the SCG

The Sydney Sixers were chosen to host the first game of the new and exciting format of the BBL. The game was played on 16 December 2011, at the historical Sydney Cricket Ground (SCG) against the Brisbane Heat. The Sixers then traveled down to Hobart and were dominated by the Hurricanes in a 42-run defeat. Phil Jaques and Travis Birt amassed a 107 wicket partnership, with Birt the Player of the Match. Upon returning home, a standout performance with the bat from West Indian import Dwayne Bravo assured the win for the Sixers with 51 runs as the Melbourne Stars fell two runs short in an exciting run chase. The Sixers then lost on the road to the Melbourne Renegades before picking up away wins against Sydney Thunder and Adelaide Strikers. The Sixers then battled-out a hard-fought win against the Perth Scorchers at home. After losing a couple of early wickets, Steve Smith smacked a quickfire 51 before the Sixers lost 5/8 in the final two overs to be bowled out for 176. In the end this was enough as the Scorchers failed to achieve the target by one run. The stunning spell of swing by Mitchell Starc earned him the Player of the Match.

==== Finals series ====
In form after three consecutive wins to close out the regular season, the Sixers went on to win against the Hurricanes in Hobart. Sydney were able to put on a par-score after winning the toss (6/153, Nic Maddinson – 68 runs). A good spell of bowling from Brett Lee (2/22) and Ian Moran at the death ensured the Sixers would reach the final. The Sixers went on to win the inaugural 2011–12 Big Bash League (BBL), defeating the Perth Scorchers at the WACA Ground. Again Lee (2/21) led the Sixers' attack, as they were able to restrict Perth to 8/156. Moises Henriques guided the innings, scoring 70 runs to make light work of the run-chase. The Sixers won with seven balls to spare.

=== 2012–2013: BBL02 ===
==== 2012 Champions League Twenty20 ====
By winning the inaugural 2011–12 Big Bash League, the Sixers earned the right to compete in the 2012 Champions League Twenty20 tournament. They were drawn into Group B along with the Chennai Super Kings, Mumbai Indians (India – Indian Premier League), Yorkshire (England – Twenty20 Cup) and Highveld Lions. The Sixers cruised through the group stage without too many difficulties. The batters blasted the Super Kings out of the park scoring 185/5 with the bowlers backing them up to win by 12 runs. Mitchell Starc tore through Yorkshire (96/9) to which the Sixers surpassed in 8.5 overs. The Sixers were able to overcome the Lions humble score (137/9) with and over to spare before making it four-from-four with an easy 12-run win over the Indians.

Their semi-final match against the Titans proved much more challenging. The Titans amassed a modest 163/5 with the Sixers needing all twenty to overs to secure the win. On the final delivery, Pat Cummins missed the ball entirely, but the batters were able to scramble home for a bye despite Cummins colliding with the bowler. The final, however, was in stark contrast. The Sixers' attack, led by Josh Hazlewood bundled out the Highveld Lions for a paltry 121 runs. They only needed 12.3 to blast home the runs with Michael Lumb thumping an unbeaten 82 runs.

==== Regular season ====
The Sixers' season ended in bitter disappointment, winning only two games and coming second last on the ladder. They did not qualify for the finals series.

=== 2013–2014: BBL03 ===
In what was effectively a very good regular season (only losing one of eight games) and coming second on the ladder, the Sixers were left to rue what might have been, as they were once again beaten by the Perth Scorchers in the semi-finals. In a rain-affected match, the Sixers' target was reduced to 54 in five overs, and the seemingly impossible target was realized when they fell short at 6/48.

=== 2014–2015: BBL04 ===
The Sixers put their BBL03 campaign behind them, signing some new faces whilst retaining the more experienced core group of players. The Sixers performed well throughout the entire regular season winning five games, losing two games (to Perth Scorchers and Adelaide Strikers) in regular time and losing a Super Over to the Melbourne Stars.

Coming up against the Strikers in Adelaide (to whom they had already lost to in the season) they were able to get the job done easily in the end. Some big hitting (Nic Maddinson – 85 runs) set up a 4/181 score line before the bowlers were able to rip through the Strikers batting order, all-out for 94 runs. With a very poor record against the Perth Scorchers (aside from the BBL01 Big Final victory), the Sixers opened proceedings at Manuka Oval in Canberra for the 4th edition of the "Big Final". Some early wickets made it hard going for the Sixers with skipper Moises Henriques scoring a well-made 77 (before being run-out on the final delivery). The Scorchers steadily continued to pile on the runs with wickets in hand. Needing 8 runs off the final over, Brett Lee put in arguably his best Twenty20 performance in his final game of professional cricket. His first ball was expertly paddled for runs before Lee began to sting the opposition. With three balls remaining the Scorchers were destined to win with one needed. However, Lee would not go away, taking back-to-back wickets. Still requiring one more run, with Lee on a hat-trick, Yasir Arafat was able to flick the ball off his pads and the batsmen were able to scamper through for a single after the throw to the bowler's end was too hard for Henriques to catch and effect the run-out which would have brought the game to a Super Over.

=== 2016–2017: BBL06 ===
The Sixers finished third on the BBL ladder after eight regular season games.

In the semi-final at the Gabba against the Brisbane Heat, captain Moises Henriques was the Player of the Match after the Sixers defeated the Heat in a Super Over.

The Sixers travelled to Perth for the Big Final after the first-placed Scorchers defeated the Melbourne Stars in their semi-final. However, the Sydney Sixers fell short at the last hurdle, losing the Big Bash League final to the Scorchers by nine wickets at the WACA Ground.

It was the second time in three years the Sixers made the final against the Scorchers but could not grasp the title.

== Colours ==
The Sixers play in a magenta strip. While a spokesperson from Cricket NSW alluded that the team's colours may have some connection with the "Pink dollar" and Sydney Gay and Lesbian Mardi Gras, pink was ultimately chosen for reasons more related to McGrath Foundation, and to create a "really rock star, high-profile cricket team". Orange and yellow had also been considered for the Sixers and cross-town rivals, Sydney Thunder, but Cricket NSW believed these colours were too similar to that of the Western Australian cricket team, the Wests Tigers (NRL) and the GWS Giants (AFL). Magenta, therefore, gave a unique identity for the team and attempted to create a reflection of the competition which was "new and vibrant."

== Rivalries ==
- The Sydney Smash – When the league began in 2011, Cricket Australia decided they would place two teams in Sydney. With the core group of players for both teams coming from the New South Wales cricket team, this rivalry automatically becomes widely anticipated in Sydney. After four seasons of the BBL the Sydney Sixers finally lost to the Sydney Thunder in the opening match of the fifth series, breaking the seven consecutive wins the Sixers had banked up from previous years. Thunder also swept the 2015/16 season series 2–0. Matches played in subsequent seasons up to 2020 have seen one win by each team per season.

=== List of Sydney Smash matches ===
Date	Winner	Margin	Venue	Attendance	Player of the match
8 January 2012	Sixers	17 Runs (D/L)	ANZ Stadium	31,262	Mitchell Starc
8 December 2012	Sixers	7 wickets	SCG	15,279	Brad Haddin
30 December 2012	Sixers	4 wickets	ANZ Stadium	20,986	Daniel Hughes
21 December 2013	Sixers	6 wickets	SCG	18,180	Nic Maddinson
25 January 2014	Sixers	8 wickets	ANZ Stadium	25,726	Nathan Lyon
27 December 2014	Sixers	16 runs	ANZ Stadium	32,823	Aiden Blizzard
22 January 2015	Sixers	4 wickets	SCG	36,487	Jordan Silk
17 December 2015	Thunder	36 runs	Spotless Stadium	18,287	Michael Hussey
16 January 2016	Thunder	46 runs	SCG	38,456	Shane Watson
20 December 2016	Sixers	9 wickets	Spotless Stadium	21,798	Moises Henriques
14 January 2017	Thunder	8 wickets	SCG	39,756	Fawad Ahmed
19 December 2017	Thunder	5 wickets	Spotless Stadium	21,589	Shane Watson
13 January 2018	Sixers	8 wickets	SCG	36,458	Chris Green
24 December 2018	Thunder	21 runs	Spotless Stadium	10,508	Jos Buttler
2 February 2019	Sixers	9 wickets (D/L)	SCG	34,385	Sean Abbott
28 December 2019	Sixers	Super Over	SCG	35,296	Tom Curran
18 January 2020	Thunder	4 runs (D/L)	Giants Stadium	15,476	Chris Morris
13 January 2021	Sixers	5 wickets (D/L)	Manuka Oval		Steve O'Keefe
21 January 2021	Thunder	46 runs	Adelaide Oval		Alex Hales
26 December 2021	Sixers	30 runs (D/L)	Sydney Showground Stadium		Dan Christian
15 January 2022	Sixers	60 runs	Sydney Cricket Ground		Steve O'Keefe

== Home grounds ==
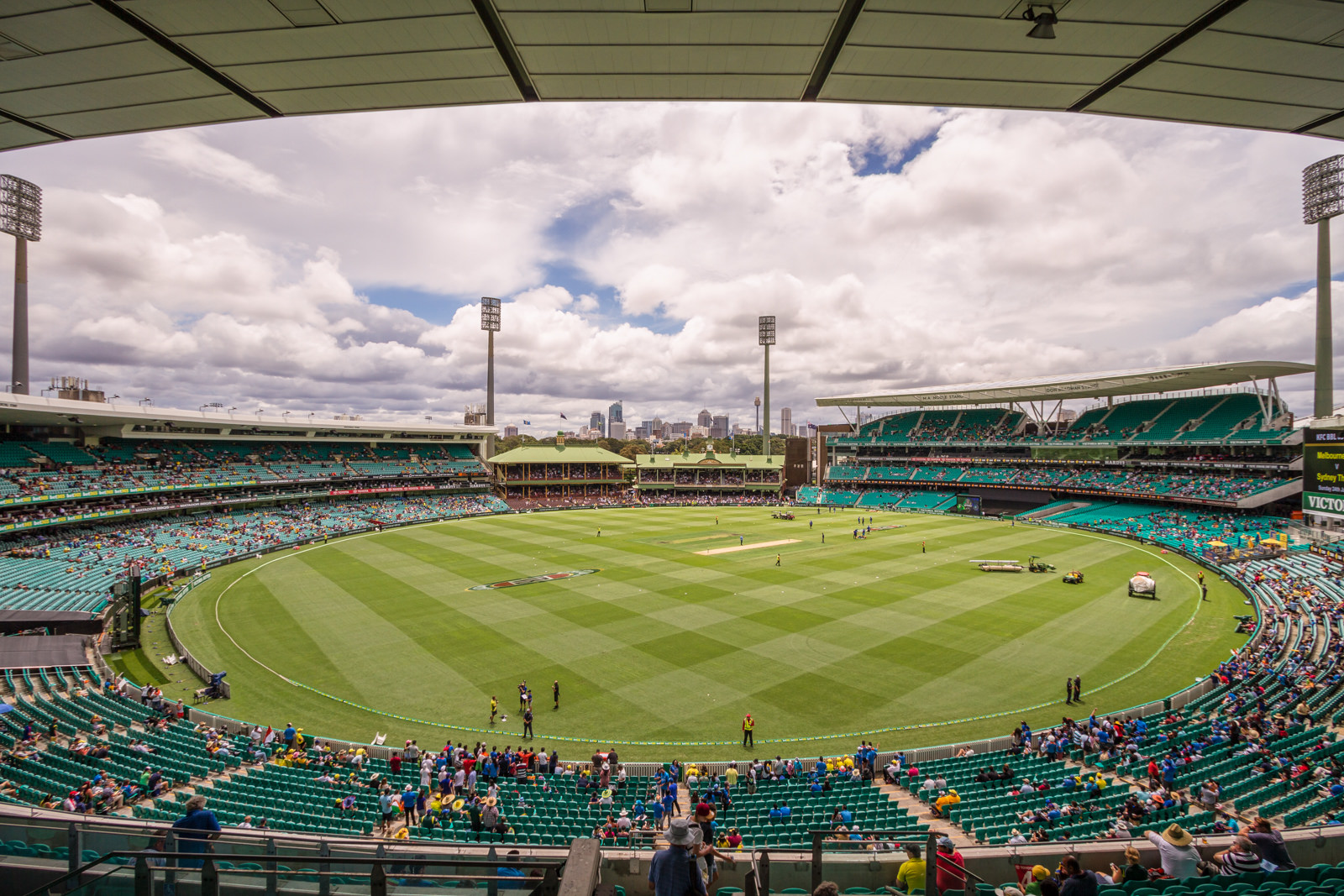
Sydney Cricket Ground

The Sydney Sixers play out of the Sydney Cricket Ground, Sydney. The stadium has had a capacity of 48,000 since the completion of redevelopments in 2014. The makeover included new state-of-art facilities and grandstand as well as one of the biggest video screens in the southern hemisphere.

The Sixers set a new domestic crowd record for cricket in New South Wales when 39,756 people attended the Sydney Smash on 14 January 2017. Since BBL|11 they also play matches at C.ex Coffs International Stadium in Coffs Harbour.

Venue	Games hosted by season															
Venue	01	02	03	04	05	06	07	08	09	10	11	12	13	14	15	Total
C.ex Coffs International Stadium	0	0	0	0	0	0	0	0	1	0	2	1	1	1	1	7
North Sydney Oval	0	0	0	0	0	0	0	0	0	0	0	1	0	0	0	1
Sydney Cricket Ground	3	4	5	4	4	4	5	7	7	1	5	6	5	5	5	70

== Current squad ==
The squad of the Sydney Sixers for the 2026–27 Big Bash League season as of 19 October 2026.

- Players with international caps are listed in **bold**.

No.	Name	Nat.	Birth date	Batting style	Bowling style	Year signed	Notes
Batters
9	Oliver Davies	Australia	14 October 2000 (age 26)	Right-handed	Right-arm off spin	2021	
26	Riley Kingsell	Australia	26 September 2005 (age 21)	Right-handed	Right-arm medium	2026	
14	Jordan Silk	Australia	13 April 1992 (age 34)	Right-handed	Right-arm leg spin	2013	
49	**Steve Smith**	Australia	2 June 1989 (age 37)	Right-handed	Right-arm leg spin	2011	
All-rounders
51	**Joel Davies**	Australia	11 September 2003 (age 23)	Left-handed	Left-arm orthodox	2023	
18	**Jack Edwards**	Australia	19 April 2000 (age 26)	Right-handed	Right-arm medium	2019	
34	**Chris Jordan**	England	4 October 1988 (age 38)	Right-handed	Right-arm fast-medium	2026	International Signing
50	Hayden Kerr	Australia	10 October 1996 (age 30)	Left-handed	Right-arm medium-fast	2020	
44	Jake Scott	Australia	10 January 2005 (age 21)	Left-handed	Right-arm fast-medium	2026	
Wicket-keepers
22	**Josh Philippe**	Australia	1 June 1997 (age 29)	Right-handed	—N/a	2018	
43	**Tim Seifert**	New Zealand	14 December 1994 (age 31)	Right-handed	—N/a	2026	International Signing
11	Lachlan Shaw	Australia	26 December 2002 (age 23)	Right-handed	—N/a	2025	
Bowlers
77	**Sean Abbott**	Australia	29 February 1992 (age 34)	Right-handed	Right-arm fast-medium	2011	
5	Jafer Chohan	England	11 July 2002 (age 24)	Right-handed	Right-arm leg spin	2024	International Signing
27	**Ben Dwarshuis**	Australia	23 June 1994 (age 32)	Left-handed	Right-arm fast-medium	2014	
9	Fergus O'Neill	Australia	27 January 2001 (age 25)	Right-handed	Right-arm fast-medium	2025	
77	Corey Rocchiccioli	Australia	8 October 1997 (age 29)	Right-handed	Right-arm off spin	2026	

== Seasons ==
=== Summaries ===
Season	W–L	Pos.	Finals	Coach	Captain	Most runs	Most wickets	Refs
2011–12	5–2	3rd	C	Trevor Bayliss	Brad Haddin	Nic Maddinson (302)	Brett Lee (16)	
2012–13	3–5	7th	DNQ	Trevor Bayliss	Brad Haddin	Moises Henriques (254)	Mitchell Starc (10)	
2013–14	6–2	2nd	SF	Trevor Bayliss	Moises Henriques	Nic Maddinson (293)	Nathan Lyon (13)	
2014–15	5–3	4th	RU	Trevor Bayliss	Moises Henriques	Nic Maddinson (346)	Doug Bollinger (12)	
2015–16	2–6	8th	DNQ	Greg Shipperd	Moises Henriques	Nic Maddinson (233)	Sean Abbott (13)	
2016–17	5–3	3rd	RU	Greg Shipperd	Moises Henriques	Daniel Hughes (369)	Sean Abbott (13)	
2017–18	4–6	5th	DNQ	Greg Shipperd	Moises Henriques	Daniel Hughes (364)	Sean Abbott (15)	
2018–19	8–6	3rd	KF	Greg Shipperd	Moises Henriques	Jordan Silk (394)	Sean Abbott (22)	
2019–20	9–4	2nd	C	Greg Shipperd	Moises Henriques	Josh Philippe (487)	Sean Abbott (15)	
2020–21	9–5	1st	C	Greg Shipperd	Moises Henriques	Josh Philippe (508)	Sean Abbott (20)	
2021–22	10–6	2nd	RU	Greg Shipperd	Moises Henriques	Josh Philippe (512)	Sean Abbott (26)	
2022–23	10–3	2nd	Third	Greg Shipperd	Moises Henriques	Josh Philippe (429)	Sean Abbott (24)	
2023–24	6–2	2nd	RU	Greg Shipperd	Moises Henriques	James Vince (359)	Sean Abbott (20)	
2024–25	6–2	2nd	Third	Greg Shipperd	Moises Henriques	Josh Philippe (356)	Ben Dwarshuis (17)	
2025–26	8–2	2nd	RU	Greg Shipperd	Moises Henriques	Steve Smith (299)	Jack Edwards (19)	

=== Tournament finishes ===
Chart of yearly table positions for Sydney Sixers in BBL

Season	League standing	Final standing
2011–12	3rd out of 8	Champions
2012–13	7th out of 8	Did not qualify
2013–14	2nd out of 8	Semifinals
2014–15	4th out of 8	Runners-up
2015–16	8th out of 8	Did not qualify
2016–17	3rd out of 8	Runners-up
2017–18	5th out of 8	Did not qualify
2018–19	3rd out of 8	Knockout
2019–20	2nd out of 8	Champions
2020–21	1st out of 8	Champions
2021–22	2nd out of 8	Runners-up
2022–23	2nd out of 8	Third
2023–24	2nd out of 8	Runners-up
2024–25	2nd out of 8	Third
2026–27	2nd out of 8	Runners-up

- C: Champions
- RU: Runners-up
- SF: Team qualified for the semi-final stage
- Third: Finished third

=== Statistics ===
Season	Big Bash League								Champions League Twenty20
Season	P	W	L	NR	Pts	NRR	Position	Finals	Champions League Twenty20
2011–12	7	5	2	0	10	+0.262	3rd	Champions	—
2012–13	8	3	5	0	6	–0.380	7th	—	Champions
2013–14	8	6	2	0	12	–0.218	2nd	Semifinals	—
2014–15	8	5	3	0	10	–0.014	4th	Runners-up	—
2015–16	8	2	6	0	4	–0.330	8th	—	Tournament not held
2016–17	8	5	3	0	10	–0.848	3rd	Runners-up	Tournament not held
2017–18	10	4	6	0	8	+0.331	5th	—	Tournament not held
2018–19	14	8	6	0	16	+0.047	3rd	—	Tournament not held
2019–20	14	9	4	1	19	+0.269	2nd	Champions	Tournament not held
2020–21	14	9	5	0	36	+0.257	1st	Champions	Tournament not held
2021–22	17	10	6	1	35	+1.027	2nd	Runners-up	Tournament not held
2022–23	14	10	3	1	21	+0.846	2nd	Third	Tournament not held
2023–24	10	6	2	2	14	+0.339	2nd	Runners-up	Tournament not held
2024–25	10	6	2	2	14	+0.156	2nd	Third	Tournament not held
2025–26	10	6	3	1	13	+0.339	2nd	Runners-up	

== Honours ==
- Big Bash:
  - Champions: 3 – BBL |01, BBL |09, BBL |10
  - Runners-up: 5 – BBL |04, BBL |06, BBL |11, BBL |13, BBL |15,
  - Minor Premiers: 1 – BBL |10
  - Finals Series appearances: 12 – BBL |01, BBL |03, BBL |04, BBL |06, BBL |08, BBL |09, BBL |10, BBL |11,
    BBL |12, BBL |13, BBL |14, BBL |15
  - Wooden Spoons: 1 – BBL |05
- Champions League Twenty20:
  - Champions: 1 – 2012

== Records ==
=== Results summary ===
As of 23 January 2026

Big Bash League
Opposition	M	Won	Lost	Tied (W)	NR	W–L%
Adelaide Strikers	22	14	8	0	0	63.63
Brisbane Heat	25	16	7	1 (1)	1	68.75
Hobart Hurricanes	23	10	11	0	2	47.61
Melbourne Renegades	21	15	5	0	1	75.00
Melbourne Stars	26	16	9	1 (0)	0	63.46
Perth Scorchers	31	12	18	1 (0)	0	40.32
Sydney Thunder	30	19	8	1 (1)	2	69.64
Total	178	102	66	4 (2)	6	60.63

Champions League Twenty20
Opposition	M	Won	Lost	Tied	NR	W–L%
Chennai Super Kings	1	1	0	0	0	100
Highveld Lions	2	2	0	0	0	100
Mumbai Indians	1	1	0	0	0	100
Titans	1	1	0	0	0	100
Yorkshire Carnegie	1	1	0	0	0	100
Total	6	6	0	0	0	100

=== Team records ===
==== Highest totals ====
As of 23 January 2026

Score (overs)	RR	Inns	Opposition	Venue	Tournament	Date	Ref
3/220 (20.0)	11.00	1st	Perth Scorchers	Sydney Cricket Ground, Sydney	BBL|14	11 January 2025	
4/213 (20.0)	10.65	1st	Melbourne Stars	Sydney Cricket Ground, Sydney	BBL|11	5 December 2021	
209 (20.0)	10.45	2nd	Brisbane Heat	The Gabba, Brisbane	BBL|12	1 January 2023	
4/205 (20.0)	10.25	1st	Melbourne Renegades	Bellerive Oval, Hobart	BBL|10	13 December 2020	
5/203 (20.0)	10.15	1st	Adelaide Strikers	Coffs Harbour International Stadium, Coffs Harbour	BBL|12	17 January 2023	

==== Lowest totals ====
As of 23 January 2026

Score (overs)	RR	Inns	Opposition	Venue	Tournament	Date	Ref
74 (13.4)	5.41	2nd	Melbourne Stars	Melbourne Cricket Ground, Melbourne	BBL|08	10 February 2019	
76 (15.5)	4.8	1st	Sydney Thunder	Sydney Showground Stadium, Sydney	BBL|09	18 January 2020	
92 (16.2)	5.63	2nd	Perth Scorchers	Docklands Stadium, Melbourne	BBL|11	28 January 2022	
97 (16.4)	5.82	2nd	Perth Scorchers	Perth Stadium, Perth	BBL|10	6 January 2021	
9/99 (20.0)	4.95	1st	Sydney Thunder	Sydney Cricket Ground, Sydney	BBL|06	14 January 2017	

=== Batting records ===
==== Most career runs ====
As of 23 January 2025

Batter	Span	Mat	Inns	Runs
Moises Henriques	2011–2026	159	148	3,386
Josh Philippe	2018–2026	112	108	2,714
Jordan Silk	2013–2026	141	114	2,437
Daniel Hughes	2012–2026	100	95	2,340
James Vince	2019–2025	73	71	2013

==== Highest individual score ====
As of 23 January 2026

Batter	Runs	Balls	Opposition	Venue	Tournament	Date
Steve Smith	125*	66	Sydney Thunder	Sydney Cricket Ground, Sydney	BBL|12	21 January 2023
Steve Smith	121*	64	Perth Scorchers	Sydney Cricket Ground, Sydney	BBL|14	11 January 2025
James Vince	101*	58	Melbourne Stars	Sydney Cricket Ground, Sydney	BBL|14	26 December 2024
Steve Smith	101	56	Adelaide Strikers	Coffs Harbour International Stadium, Coffs Harbour	BBL|12	17 January 2023
Steve Smith	100	42	Sydney Thunder	Sydney Cricket Ground, Sydney	BBL|15	17 January 2023

==== Highest averages and strike rates ====
As of 23 January 2026

Highest averages
Batter	Span	Mat	Inns	Ave
Steve Smith	2011–2026	45	42	47.54
Joe Denly	2018–2019	11	11	35.37
James Vince	2019–2025	73	71	32.46
Sam Billings	2016–2018	11	10	31.44
Jordan Silk	2013–2026	141	114	30.84
Minimum innings played — 10

Highest strike rates
Batter	Span	SR
Steve Smith	2011–2026	146.77
Tom Curran	2018–2024	143.60
Ben Dwarshuis	2014–2026	141.77
Dan Christian	2020–2023	139.82
Josh Philippe	2018–2026	137.90
Minimum balls faced — 250

==== Most fifties and hundreds ====
As of 23 January 2026

Most fifties (and over)
Batter	Span	Mat	Inns	50s
Josh Philippe	2018–2026	112	108	18
Moises Henriques	2011–2026	159	148	17
Daniel Hughes	2011–2026	100	95	16
Steve Smith	2011–2026	45	42	14
James Vince	2019–2025	73	71	12

Most hundreds
Batter	Span	Mat	Inns	100s
Steve Smith	2011–2026	45	42	4
James Vince	2019–2025	73	71	1

=== Bowling records ===
==== Most wickets ====
As of 23 January 2026

Bowler	Span	Inn	Wickets
Sean Abbott	2014–2026	117	174
Ben Dwarshuis	2014–2026	125	164
Steve O'Keefe	2012–2024	102	101
Hayden Kerr	2019–2026	51	58
Tom Curran	2018–2024	35	51

==== Best economy rates ====
As of 23 January 2026

Bowler	Span	Overs	Econ
Luke Feldman	2012–2014	26.2	6.53
Joel Davies	2023–2026	38.0	6.55
Steve O'Keefe	2012–2024	354.5	6.58
Stuart MacGill	2011–2012	25.0	6.64
Todd Murphy	2021–2025	69.0	6.73
Minimum overs bowled – 25.0

==== Best bowling figures ====
Bowler	Figure	Overs	Econ	Opposition	Venue	Tournament	Date	Ref
Sean Abbott	5/16	4.0	4.00	Adelaide Strikers	Adelaide Oval, Adelaide	BBL|06	31 December 2016	
Ben Dwarshuis	5/21	3.5	5.47	Brisbane Heat	Carrara Stadium, Gold Coast	BBL|13	19 January 2024	
Nathan Lyon	5/23	3.5	6.00	Hobart Hurricanes	Sydney Cricket Ground, Sydney	BBL|05	20 December 2015	
Ben Dwarshuis	5/26	4.0	6.50	Melbourne Renegades	Kardinia Park	BBL|11	11 January 2022	
Jack Edwards	5/26	4.0	6.50	Sydney Thunder	Sydney Showground Stadium, Sydney	BBL|15	20 December 2025	

=== Partnership records ===
==== Highest partnership by wicket ====
Wicket	Runs	First batter	Second batter	Opposition	Venue	Date
1st	141	Steve Smith	Babar Azam	Sydney Thunder	Sydney Cricket Ground, Sydney	16 January 2026
2nd	167*	James Vince	Josh Philippe	Hobart Hurricanes	Sydney Cricket Ground, Sydney	23 January 2019
3rd	155*	Steve Smith	Moises Henriques	Sydney Thunder	Sydney Cricket Ground, Sydney	21 January 2023
4th	124	Daniel Hughes	Jordan Silk	Perth Scorchers	Sydney Cricket Ground, Sydney	22 December 2018
5th	98	Moises Henriques	Ryan Carters	Perth Scorchers	Manuka Oval, Canberra	28 January 2015
6th	77*	Jordan Silk	Dan Christian	Melbourne Stars	Melbourne Cricket Ground, Melbourne	26 January 2021
7th	88	Tom Curran	Sean Abbott	Sydney Thunder	Sydney Showground Stadium, Sydney	24 December 2018
8th	62*	Hayden Kerr	Joel Davies	Brisbane Heat	Coffs Harbour International Stadium, Coffs Harbour	5 January 2026
9th	59*	Sean Abbott	Ben Dwarshuis	Brisbane Heat	Sydney Cricket Ground, Sydney	29 December 2021
10th	43	Ben Dwarshuis	Steve O'Keefe	Perth Scorchers	Docklands Stadium, Melbourne	22 January 2022

==== Highest partnership by runs ====
Runs	First batter	Second batter	Opposition	Wicket	Venue	Date
167*	James Vince	Josh Philippe	Hobart Hurricanes	2nd	Sydney Cricket Ground, Sydney	23 January 2019
155*	Steve Smith	Moises Henriques	Sydney Thunder	3rd	Sydney Cricket Ground, Sydney	21 January 2023
155*	Steve Smith	Kurtis Patterson	Adelaide Strikers	2nd	Coffs Harbour International Stadium, Coffs Harbour	21 January 2023
141	Steve Smith	Babar Azam	Sydney Thunder	1st	Sydney Cricket Ground, Sydney	16 January 2026
140	Josh Philippe	Babar Azam	Sydney Thunder	2nd	Sydney Showground Stadium, Sydney	20 December 2025

== Administration and support staff ==
Sydney Sixers staff
Position	Name
Head coach	Matthew Mott
General manager	Rachel Haynes

=== Coaching history ===
Name	Years	ref
Trevor Bayliss	2011–2015	
Greg Shipperd	2015–2026	
Matthew Mott	2026–present	

== Players ==
=== Australian representatives ===
The following is a list of cricketers who have played for the Sixers after making their debut in the national men's team (the period they spent as both a Sixers squad member and an Australian-capped player is in brackets):

- Brad Haddin (BBL|01–03)
- Steve Smith (BBL|01–03, 05, 12–16)
- Mitchell Starc (BBL|01–04, 15)
- Brett Lee (BBL|01–04)
- Josh Hazlewood (BBL|01–06, 15)
- Moises Henriques (BBL|03–15)
- Stephen O'Keefe (BBL|04–11)
- Nathan Lyon (BBL|04–12)
- Sean Abbott (BBL|04–16)
- Ben Dwarshuis (BBL|10–16)
- Josh Philippe (BBL|11–16)
- Todd Murphy (BBL|13–15)
- Kane Richardson (BBL|15)
- Joel Davies (BBL|16)

=== Overseas players ===
- Dwayne Bravo – West Indies (2011)
- Michael Lumb – England (2011–2015)
- Jeevan Mendis – Sri Lanka (2012)
- Sunil Narine – West Indies (2012)
- Nathan McCullum – New Zealand (2012)
- Ravi Bopara – England (2013)
- Chris Tremlett – England (2013)
- Sachithra Senanayake – Sri Lanka (2013)
- Dwayne Smith – West Indies (2014)
- Riki Wessels – England (2014–2015)
- Johan Botha – South Africa (2015)
- Sam Billings – England (2016–2018)
- Jason Roy – England (2016–2018)
- Colin Munro – New Zealand (2017)
- Carlos Brathwaite – West Indies (2018, 2020–2021)
- Joe Denly – England (2018–2019)
- Tom Curran – England (2018–2021)
- James Vince – England (2019–2023)
- Jason Holder – West Indies (2020)
- Jake Ball – England (2021)
- Chris Jordan – England (2021–2022)
- Izharulhaq Naveed (2022)
- Jafer Chohan (2024–2026)
- Akeal Hossien
- Sam Curran (2025)
- Babar Azam (2025)
- Tim Seifert (2026–)

== Captains ==
Captain	Span	Matches	Won	Lost	Tied	NR	W–L%
Brad Haddin	2011–16	10	5	5	0	0	50
Steve Smith	2011–14	11	8	2	1	0	72.72
Moises Henriques	2013–25	116	67	41	3	5	57.75
Marcus North	2014	1	0	1	0	0	0
Nic Maddinson	2015–16	5	1	4	0	0	20
Johan Botha	2017–18	8	4	4	0	0	50
Daniel Hughes	2020–22	15	10	5	0	0	66.66

== See also ==
- Cricket in New South Wales
- Cricket NSW
- New South Wales Blues
- Sydney Thunder
