= 2011–12 Sydney Sixers season =

Inaugural season of Australian cricket team

Sydney Sixers
2011–12 season
- Coach: Trevor Bayliss (1st season)
- Captain(s): Brad Haddin (1st season)
- Home ground: Sydney Cricket Ground, Sydney
- CLT20: DNQ
- Big Bash League: 3rd
- BBL Finals: Champions
- Leading Run Scorer: Nic Maddinson (275)
- Leading Wicket Taker: Mitchell Starc (13)
- Highest home attendance: 27,520 (Round 3 v Melbourne Stars)
- Lowest home attendance: 12,285 (Round 1 v Brisbane Heat)

The 2011–12 Sydney Sixers season was the club's inaugural season in the Big Bash League (BBL) as the league adopted city-based teams rather than the traditional state representative team format of previous years. This was to align itself with the structure of the Indian Premier League for the ongoing Champions League Twenty20 competition. The Sixers were the inaugural champions of the Big Bash League, thus earning the right to compete in the 2012 Champions League Twenty20 in October 2012. The Sixers went on to win this tournament in their first effort.

== Players ==
=== Squad ===
Players with international caps are listed in bold.

- Ages are given as of 16 December 2011, the date of the first match played during the tournament

No.	Name	Nationality	Date of birth	Batting style	Bowling style	Notes
Batsmen
7	Dominic Thornely	Australia	1 October 1978 (aged 33)	Right-handed	Right-arm medium & off spin	
35	**Ed Cowan**	Australia	16 June 1982 (aged 29)	Left-handed	Right-arm leg break	
45	**Michael Lumb**	England	12 February 1980 (aged 31)	Left-handed	Right-arm medium	Overseas player
53	Nic Maddinson	Australia	21 December 1991 (aged 19)	Left-handed	Slow Left-arm orthodox	
99	Ben Rohrer	Australia	26 March 1981 (aged 30)	Left-handed	–	
All-rounders
5	Ian Moran	Australia	16 August 1979 (aged 32)	Right-handed	Right-arm fast-medium	
15	**Nathan McCullum**	New Zealand	1 September 1980 (aged 31)	Right-handed	Right-arm off break	Overseas Player (replaced Dwayne Bravo mid-season)
19	**Steve Smith**	Australia	2 June 1989 (aged 22)	Right-handed	Right-arm leg break	
21	**Moisés Henriques**	Australia	1 February 1987 (aged 24)	Right-handed	Right-arm fast-medium	
33	**Shane Watson**	Australia	17 June 1981 (aged 30)	Right-handed	Right-arm medium	
47	**Dwayne Bravo**	West Indies	7 October 1983 (aged 28)	Right-handed	Right-arm fast-medium	Overseas Player (left mid-season to join national team)
72	**Stephen O'Keefe**	Australia	9 December 1984 (aged 27)	Right-handed	Slow left-arm orthodox	
Wicket-keepers
20	Peter Nevill	Australia	13 October 1985 (aged 26)	Right-handed	–	
24	**Brad Haddin**	Australia	23 October 1977 (aged 34)	Right-handed	–	Captain
Bowlers
8	**Josh Hazlewood**	Australia	8 January 1991 (aged 20)	Left-handed	Right-arm fast-medium	
11	**Stuart MacGill**	Australia	25 February 1971 (aged 40)	Right-handed	Right-arm leg break	
27	**Pat Cummins**	Australia	8 May 1993 (aged 18)	Right-handed	Right-arm fast	
58	**Brett Lee**	Australia	8 November 1976 (aged 35)	Right-handed	Right-arm fast	
56	**Mitchell Starc**	Australia	30 January 1990 (aged 21)	Left-handed	Left-arm fast-medium	

== Review ==
In an exciting time for the league with the introduction of city-based teams, the Sydney Sixers were chosen to host the first game of this new format. The game was played on 16 December 2011, at the historical Sydney Cricket Ground (SCG). The Sixers opponents were Brisbane Heat. After losing the toss, the Sixers were asked to field first. The Sixers bowlers did a capable job of restricting the Heat to 8/139 from their allotted 20 overs. Stuart MacGill showed his class, coming out of retirement for this tournament, to end with the best figures from a Sixers bowler with 2/21. The Sixers easily chased down the runs with 8 balls to spare. Skipper and opening batsmen Brad Haddin got the Sixers off to a flying start, scoring 76 from 59 balls, allowing Steve Smith and Moises Henriques to pick up the final runs for the Sixers. The batting performance from Haddin earned him the Player of the Match award.

The Sixers then traveled down to Hobart to meet the Hurricanes. The Hurricanes dominated the match and won by 42 runs. After scoring at 6-runs per over with the loss of one wicket after 10 overs, Phil Jaques and Travis Birt unleashed a flurry of boundaries and scoring shots to amass a 107 wicket partnership. This was broken by the ever-willing wicket-taker Mitchell Starc. The Hurricanes made 3/169 and this total was seemingly unreachable for the Sixers after losing some early wickets. A fantastic spell of seam bowling from cult-hero Rana Naved-ul-Hasan, including 4 wickets for 6 runs from 11 balls at the death was enough to kill of the game. Hurricanes top order batsmen Birt was named Player of the Match.

A return to the SCG brought a return to the winners' circle for the Sixers. A standout performance with the bat from West Indian import Dwayne Bravo assured the win for the Sixers. The Sixers won the toss, batted and scored 9/166 in their 20 overs. Melbourne Stars all-rounder David Hussey was their best with ball (2/25) and bat (42 runs), but his performance was not enough to get the Stars over the line. The Stars fell 2 runs short in an exciting run chase.

The Sixers then picked up three wins on the road against the Melbourne Renegades, Sydney Thunder and Adelaide Strikers before battling out a hard-fought win against the Perth Scorchers at home. After losing a couple of early wickets, a steadying partnership from Henriques and Maddinson followed. A fantastic exhibition of ball striking from Smith in his 51 from 25 balls boosted the Sixers run rate. The final two overs saw the Sixers lose 5 for 8 and bowled out for 176. In the end this was enough as the Scorchers failed to achieve the target by the narrowest of margins. The run chase began well with the Scorches 0/32 from the first four overs. Mitchell Starc then claimed three wickets in five balls with some magnificent swinging deliveries. A calming performance from Marcus North assured Perth of securing top spot on the ladder, needing only 151 runs to do so. With one over to go, Perth needed 13 runs for victory. Brett Lee was the bowler for the Sixers. After a one, four, one from the first three balls, Perth now needed seven runs from three balls. Lee bowled a dot ball as Nathan Coulter-Nile swung and missed a full ball outside off stump. Lee then bowled Coulter-Nile out, but the umpire called no-ball. Replays suggested it was a legal delivery. Lee's next delivery was a wide. In what probably should have been an unbeatable seven from the last ball, now became five from two balls. Coulter-Nile scored two runs off the next ball. The final ball saw Coulter-Nile drive to Steve Smith at long on and as the batsmen tried to make two runs for a draw the result was inevitable. Smith's throw was accurate to Lee, who was able to knock off the bails, running North out. The Scorchers fell one run short. The stunning spell of swing by Starc earned him the Player of the Match.

== Big Bash League ==
=== Regular season ===
==== Ladder ====
Pos	Team	Pld	W	L	NR	Pts	NRR	Qualification
1	Perth Scorchers	7	5	2	0	10	0.626	Advanced to semi-finals
2	Hobart Hurricanes	7	5	2	0	10	0.569	Advanced to semi-finals
3	Sydney Sixers (C)	7	5	2	0	10	0.262	Advanced to semi-finals
4	Melbourne Stars	7	4	3	0	8	0.254	Advanced to semi-finals
5	Brisbane Heat	7	3	4	0	6	0.324	
6	Adelaide Strikers	7	2	5	0	4	−0.338	
7	Melbourne Renegades	7	2	5	0	4	−0.582	
8	Sydney Thunder	7	2	5	0	4	−1.250	

(C) Champions

==== Matches ====
16 December 2011	Brisbane Heat; 8/139 (20 overs)	v	Sydney Sixers (H); 3/140 (18.4 overs)	Sydney Sixers won by 7 wickets
19:00 UTC+11 (D/N); Scorecard	Brisbane Heat; 8/139 (20 overs)	v	Sydney Sixers (H); 3/140 (18.4 overs)	Sydney Cricket Ground, Sydney; Attendance: 12,285; Umpires: Bruce Oxenford & Paul Reiffel; Player of the match: Brad Haddin (Sydney Sixers)
19:00 UTC+11 (D/N); Scorecard	Dan Christian 32 (22); Stuart MacGill 2/21 (4 overs)		Brad Haddin 76 (59); Dan Christian 1/20 (4 overs)	Sydney Cricket Ground, Sydney; Attendance: 12,285; Umpires: Bruce Oxenford & Paul Reiffel; Player of the match: Brad Haddin (Sydney Sixers)
Brisbane Heat won the toss and elected to bat				Sydney Cricket Ground, Sydney; Attendance: 12,285; Umpires: Bruce Oxenford & Paul Reiffel; Player of the match: Brad Haddin (Sydney Sixers)

21 December 2011	Hobart Hurricanes (H); 3/169 (20 overs)	v	Sydney Sixers; 9/127 (20 overs)	Hobart Hurricanes won by 42 runs
19:00 UTC+11 (D/N); Scorecard	Hobart Hurricanes (H); 3/169 (20 overs)	v	Sydney Sixers; 9/127 (20 overs)	Bellerive Oval, Hobart; Attendance: 8,298; Umpires: Simon Fry & Geoff Joshua; Player of the match: Travis Birt (Hobart Hurricanes)
19:00 UTC+11 (D/N); Scorecard	Phil Jaques 73 (55); Mitchell Starc 2/35 (4 overs)		Nic Maddinson 33 (27); Rana Naved-ul-Hasan 4/22 (4 overs)	Bellerive Oval, Hobart; Attendance: 8,298; Umpires: Simon Fry & Geoff Joshua; Player of the match: Travis Birt (Hobart Hurricanes)
Hobart Hurricanes won the toss and elected to bat				Bellerive Oval, Hobart; Attendance: 8,298; Umpires: Simon Fry & Geoff Joshua; Player of the match: Travis Birt (Hobart Hurricanes)

27 December 2011	Sydney Sixers (H); 9/166 (20 overs)	v	Melbourne Stars; 8/164 (20 overs)	Sydney Sixers won by 2 runs
19:00 UTC+11 (D/N); Scorecard	Sydney Sixers (H); 9/166 (20 overs)	v	Melbourne Stars; 8/164 (20 overs)	Sydney Cricket Ground, Sydney; Attendance: 27,520; Umpires: Gerard Abood & Bruce Oxenford; Player of the match: Dwayne Bravo (Sydney Sixers)
19:00 UTC+11 (D/N); Scorecard	Dwayne Bravo 51 (39); David Hussey 2/25 (4 overs)		David Hussey 42 (30); Steve Smith 2/27 (4 overs)	Sydney Cricket Ground, Sydney; Attendance: 27,520; Umpires: Gerard Abood & Bruce Oxenford; Player of the match: Dwayne Bravo (Sydney Sixers)
Sydney Sixers won the toss and elected to bat				Sydney Cricket Ground, Sydney; Attendance: 27,520; Umpires: Gerard Abood & Bruce Oxenford; Player of the match: Dwayne Bravo (Sydney Sixers)

2 January 2012	Sydney Sixers; 6/161 (20 overs)	v	Melbourne Renegades (H); 2/164 (17.4 overs)	Melbourne Renegades won by 8 wickets
19:00 UTC+11 (D/N); Scorecard	Sydney Sixers; 6/161 (20 overs)	v	Melbourne Renegades (H); 2/164 (17.4 overs)	Docklands Stadium, Melbourne; Attendance: 12,238; Umpires: Mick Martell & Paul Reiffel; Player of the match: Andrew McDonald (Melbourne Renegades)
19:00 UTC+11 (D/N); Scorecard	Moises Henriques 41 (30); Shane Harwood 2/28 (3 overs)		Brad Hodge 72* (51); Josh Hazlewood 1/19 (2 overs)	Docklands Stadium, Melbourne; Attendance: 12,238; Umpires: Mick Martell & Paul Reiffel; Player of the match: Andrew McDonald (Melbourne Renegades)
Sydney Sixers won the toss and elected to bat				Docklands Stadium, Melbourne; Attendance: 12,238; Umpires: Mick Martell & Paul Reiffel; Player of the match: Andrew McDonald (Melbourne Renegades)

8 January 2012	Sydney Sixers; 7/117 (16 overs)	v	Sydney Thunder (H); 4/29 (5.3 overs)	Sydney Sixers wins by 17 runs (D/L)
18:00 UTC+11 (D/N); Scorecard	Sydney Sixers; 7/117 (16 overs)	v	Sydney Thunder (H); 4/29 (5.3 overs)	ANZ Stadium, Sydney; Attendance: 31,262; Umpires: Bruce Oxenford and Paul Reiffel; Player of the match: Mitchell Starc (Sydney Sixers)
18:00 UTC+11 (D/N); Scorecard	Ben Rohrer 38 (24); Sean Abbott 2/17 (2 overs)		Jason Floros 15 (10); Mitchell Starc 3/17 (2.3 overs)	ANZ Stadium, Sydney; Attendance: 31,262; Umpires: Bruce Oxenford and Paul Reiffel; Player of the match: Mitchell Starc (Sydney Sixers)
Sydney Sixers won the toss and elected to bat.; Rain ended the match during the Sydney Thunder's innings after 5.3 overs.				ANZ Stadium, Sydney; Attendance: 31,262; Umpires: Bruce Oxenford and Paul Reiffel; Player of the match: Mitchell Starc (Sydney Sixers)

10 January 2012	Sydney Sixers; 8/151 (20 overs)	v	Adelaide Strikers (H); 87 (18.4 overs)	Sydney Sixers won by 64 runs
19:00 UTC+10:30 (D/N); Scorecard	Sydney Sixers; 8/151 (20 overs)	v	Adelaide Strikers (H); 87 (18.4 overs)	Adelaide Oval, Adelaide; Attendance: 26,837; Umpires: Ashley Barrow and Mick Martell; Player of the match: Stephen O'Keefe (Sydney Sixers)
19:00 UTC+10:30 (D/N); Scorecard	Moises Henriques 42 (37); Alfonso Thomas 3/24 (4 overs)		Aiden Blizzard 27 (21); Steve O'Keefe 3/20 (4 overs)	Adelaide Oval, Adelaide; Attendance: 26,837; Umpires: Ashley Barrow and Mick Martell; Player of the match: Stephen O'Keefe (Sydney Sixers)
Sydney Sixers won the toss and elected to bat.				Adelaide Oval, Adelaide; Attendance: 26,837; Umpires: Ashley Barrow and Mick Martell; Player of the match: Stephen O'Keefe (Sydney Sixers)

18 January 2012	Sydney Sixers (H); 176 (20 overs)	v	Perth Scorchers; 6/175 (20 overs)	Sydney Sixers won by 1 run
19:00 UTC+11 (D/N); Scorecard	Sydney Sixers (H); 176 (20 overs)	v	Perth Scorchers; 6/175 (20 overs)	Sydney Cricket Ground, Sydney; Attendance: 20,400; Umpires: Simon Fry and Paul Wilson; Player of the match: Mitchell Starc (Sydney Sixers)
19:00 UTC+11 (D/N); Scorecard	Steve Smith 51 (25); Nathan Coulter-Nile 3/38 (4 overs)		Marcus North 59 (52); Mitchell Starc 3/28 (4 overs)	Sydney Cricket Ground, Sydney; Attendance: 20,400; Umpires: Simon Fry and Paul Wilson; Player of the match: Mitchell Starc (Sydney Sixers)
Sydney Sixers won the toss and elected to bat				Sydney Cricket Ground, Sydney; Attendance: 20,400; Umpires: Simon Fry and Paul Wilson; Player of the match: Mitchell Starc (Sydney Sixers)

=== Finals ===
==== Playoff tree ====
Semi-finals
1	Perth Scorchers	3/174 (20)
4	Melbourne Stars	8/163 (20)
2	Hobart Hurricanes	7/146 (20)
3	Sydney Sixers	6/153 (20)

Final
1	Perth Scorchers	5/156 (20)
3	Sydney Sixers	3/158 (18.5)

==== Matches ====
22 January 2012	Sydney Sixers; 6/153 (20 overs)	v	Hobart Hurricanes; 7/146 (20 overs)	Sydney Sixers won by 7 runs
19:00 UTC+11 (D/N); Scorecard	Sydney Sixers; 6/153 (20 overs)	v	Hobart Hurricanes; 7/146 (20 overs)	Blundstone Arena; Attendance: 14,185; Umpires: Mick Martell and Paul Reiffel; Player of the match: Nic Maddinson (Sydney Sixers)
19:00 UTC+11 (D/N); Scorecard	Nic Maddinson 68 (51); Ben Laughlin 2/25 (4 overs)		Phil Jaques 63 (48); Brett Lee 2/22 (4 overs)	Blundstone Arena; Attendance: 14,185; Umpires: Mick Martell and Paul Reiffel; Player of the match: Nic Maddinson (Sydney Sixers)
Sydney Sixers won the toss and elected to bat				Blundstone Arena; Attendance: 14,185; Umpires: Mick Martell and Paul Reiffel; Player of the match: Nic Maddinson (Sydney Sixers)

28 January 2012	Perth Scorchers; 8/156 (20 overs)	v	Sydney Sixers; 3/158 (18.5 overs)	Sydney Sixers won by 7 wickets
17:00 UTC+8 (D/N); Scorecard	Perth Scorchers; 8/156 (20 overs)	v	Sydney Sixers; 3/158 (18.5 overs)	WACA Ground; Attendance: 16,255; Umpires: Paul Reiffel and John Ward; Player of the match: Moisés Henriques (Sydney Sixers)
17:00 UTC+8 (D/N); Scorecard	Mitchell Marsh 77 (57); Brett Lee 2/21 (4 overs)		Moisés Henriques 70 (41); Ben Edmondson 2/25 (3.5 overs)	WACA Ground; Attendance: 16,255; Umpires: Paul Reiffel and John Ward; Player of the match: Moisés Henriques (Sydney Sixers)
Perth Scorchers won the toss and elected to bat				WACA Ground; Attendance: 16,255; Umpires: Paul Reiffel and John Ward; Player of the match: Moisés Henriques (Sydney Sixers)

== Champions League Twenty20 ==
As winners of the 2011–12 Big Bash League season, the Sixers earned the right to compete in the 2012 Champions League Twenty20 tournament. Please see 2012–13 Sydney Sixers season#Champions League Twenty20 for more details.
