= Daniel Hughes (cricketer) =

Australian cricketer (born 1989)

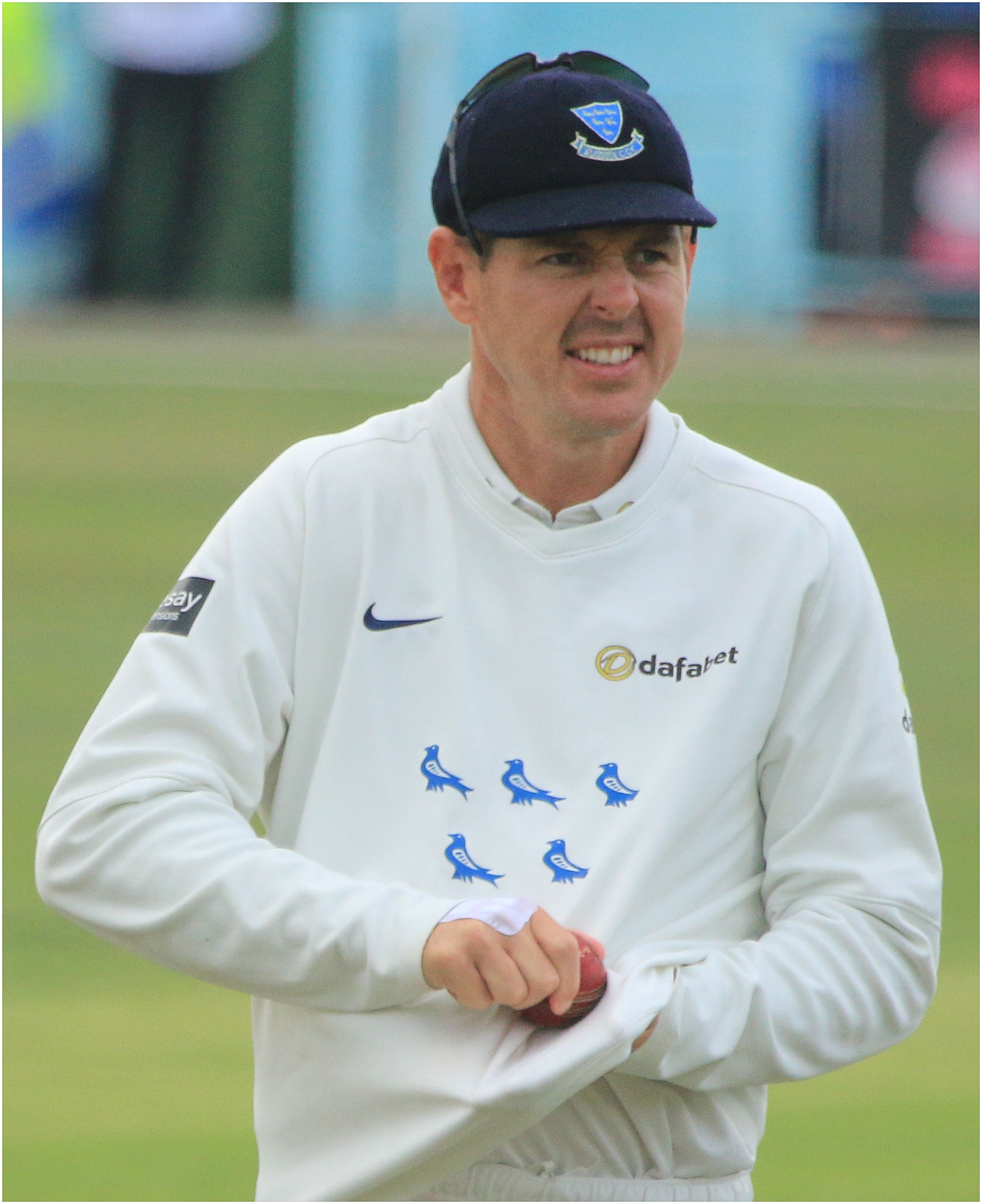
- Hughes playing for Sussex (2025)

Personal information
- Full name: Daniel Peter Hughes
- Born: 16 February 1989 (age 37); Bathurst, New South Wales, Australia
- Height: 187 cm (6 ft 2 in)
- Batting: Left-handed
- Bowling: Right-arm medium
- Role: Opening batter

Domestic team information
- Years: Team
- 2012/13–2024/25: New South Wales (squad no. 16)
- 2012/13: Sydney Sixers
- 2013/14–2014/15: Sydney Thunder
- 2016/17–present: Sydney Sixers (squad no. 16)
- 2024–2026: Sussex (squad no. 89)
- 2024: Southern Brave (squad no. 16)
- First-class debut: 14 March 2013 New South Wales v South Australia
- List A debut: 11 February 2013 New South Wales v Tasmania

Career statistics
Competition	FC	LA	T20
Matches	105	48	157
Runs scored	6,658	2,547	3,949
Batting average	37.40	57.88	29.91
100s/50s	13/37	11/11	1/23
Top score	178	152	108*
Catches/stumpings	65/–	21/–	49/–
- Source: ESPNcricinfo, 26 September 2026

Daniel Peter Hughes (born 16 February 1989) is an Australian first-class cricketer who plays for New South Wales. Hughes plays for New South Wales and made his Twenty20 debut on 26 December 2012 playing for Sydney Sixers against Hobart Hurricanes.

== Career ==
Hughes plays for the Mosman Cricket Club in the NSW Premier Cricket competition. Hughes played every match for New South Wales in the 2017–18 JLT One-Day Cup. He scored two centuries during the tournament, the first against South Australia in 45-run loss and the second against Queensland. He scored 122, his highest List A score, as part of a 192-run opening partnership with Nic Maddinson, for which he was named man of the match. This was also his fourth consecutive score of 50 or more in the tournament. Hughes signed for English county team Sussex for the 2024 T20 Blast and part of the 2024 County Championship.
