= 2025–26 Perth Scorchers season =

Perth Scorchers season

Perth Scorchers
2025–26 season
- Coach: Adam Voges
- Captain(s): Ashton Turner
- Overseas player: Finn Allen; Laurie Evans; David Payne
- Home ground: Perth Stadium
- League: BBL
- BBL season: 1st
- BBL finals: Champions (6th title)
- Leading Run Scorer: Finn Allen (466)
- Leading Wicket Taker: Cooper Connolly (15)
- Highest home attendance: 55,018
- Average home attendance: 38,947

The 2025–26 Perth Scorchers season will be the fifteen in the club's history. Coached by Adam Voges and captained by Ashton Turner, the club will compete in the BBL |15.

In the final, Perth Scorchers defeated Sydney Sixers by 6 wickets to win their sixth title.

== Background ==
The Perth Scorchers are an Australian men's professional Twenty20 franchise cricket team that competes in the Big Bash League. The Scorchers wear a teal uniform and are based in Perth in the Australian state of Western Australia. Their home ground is Perth Stadium.

== Current squad ==
- Players with international caps are listed in **bold**.

Perth Scorchers 2025–26
No.	Name	Nat.	Birth Date	Batting Style	Bowling Style	Additional Info.
Batters
32	**Finn Allen**	(New Zealand)	22 April 1999	Right-handed	Right-arm off spin	Overseas Draft Pick (Platinum)
32	Laurie Evans	(England)	12 October 1987	Right-handed	Right-arm off spin	Overseas Draft Pick (Silver)
20	Sam Fanning	(Australia)	20 November 2000	Left-handed	Right-arm off spin	
19	Nick Hobson	(Australia)	22 August 1994	Left-handed	Right-arm medium	
All-rounders
18	**Ashton Agar**	(Australia)	14 October 1993	Left-handed	Left-arm orthodox spin	
8	**Cooper Connolly**	(Australia)	22 August 2003	Left-handed	Left-arm orthodox spin	
21	**Aaron Hardie**	(Australia)	7 January 1999	Right-handed	Right-arm fast	
10	**Mitch Marsh**	(Australia)	20 October 1991	Right-handed	Right-arm fast	
17	**Ashton Turner**	(Australia)	25 January 1993	Right-handed	Right-arm off spin	Captain
Wicket Keepers
95	**Josh Inglis**	(Australia)	4 March 1995	Right-handed	—N/a	
Bowlers
4	Mahli Beardman	(Australia)	31 August 2005	Right-handed	Right-arm fast	
24	Brody Couch	(Australia)	5 December 1999	Left-handed	Right-arm fast seam	
99	Bryce Jackson	(Australia)	28 November 1999	Right-handed	Right-arm fast	
12	Matthew Kelly	(Australia)	7 December 1994	Right-handed	Right-arm fast	
28	**Lance Morris**	(Australia)	28 March 1998	Right-handed	Right-arm fast	
3	**Joel Paris**	(Australia)	11 December 1992	Left-handed	Left-arm fast	
14	**David Payne**	(England)	15 February 1991	Right-handed	Left-arm fast	Overseas Draft Pick (Bronze)
2	**Jhye Richardson**	(Australia)	20 September 1996	Right-handed	Right-arm fast	

== League stage ==
On 3 July 2025, Cricket Australia confirmed the full schedule for the tournament.

Match 1
14 December 2025
19:15 (D/N)
Scorecard

Sydney Sixers; 5/113 (11 overs)	v	Perth Scorchers; 5/117 (10.1 overs)
Jack Edwards 46* (21); Brody Couch 2/12 (2 overs)		Cooper Connolly 59 (31); Ben Dwarshuis 2/36 (3 overs)

Perth Scorchers won by 5 wickets
Perth Stadium, Perth
Attendance: 26,823
Umpires: Gerard Abood and Donovan Koch
Player of the match: Cooper Connolly (Perth Scorchers)

- Perth Scorchers won the toss and elected to field.
- The match was reduced to 11 overs per side due to rain.

== Standing ==
=== Points table ===
Pos	Team	Pld	W	L	NR	Pts	NRR	Qualification
1	Perth Scorchers (C)	10	7	3	0	14	1.363	Advanced to the Qualifier
2	Sydney Sixers (R)	10	6	3	1	13	0.605	Advanced to the Qualifier
3	Hobart Hurricanes	10	6	3	1	13	0.331	Advanced to the Knockout
4	Melbourne Stars	10	6	4	0	12	0.759	Advanced to the Knockout
5	Brisbane Heat	10	5	5	0	10	−0.431	
6	Adelaide Strikers	10	4	6	0	8	−0.231	
7	Melbourne Renegades	10	3	7	0	6	−1.202	
8	Sydney Thunder	10	2	8	0	4	−1.212	

Source: ESPNcricinfo
(C) Champions; (R) Runners-up

=== Match summary ===
Team	League matches										Finals		
Team	1	2	3	4	5	6	7	8	9	10	QF/KO	Ch	F
Perth Scorchers													

Win	Loss	Tie	No result

== Play-offs ==
Qualifier
20 January 2026
1	Perth Scorchers	9/147 (20 overs)
2	Sydney Sixers	99 (15 overs)
Knockout
21 January 2026
3	Hobart Hurricanes	5/114 (10 overs)
4	Melbourne Stars	4/81 (7 overs)

Challenger
23 January 2026
2	Sydney Sixers	8/198 (20 overs)
3	Hobart Hurricanes	141 (17.2 overs)

Final
25 January 2026
1	Perth Scorchers	4/133 (17.3 overs)
2	Sydney Sixers	132 (20 overs)

=== Qualifier ===
Qualifier
20 January 2026
19:30 (N)
Scorecard

Perth Scorchers; 9/147 (20 overs)	v	Sydney Sixers; 99 (15 overs)
Finn Allen 49 (30); Ben Dwarshuis 2/23 (4 overs)		Steve Smith 37 (24); Mahli Beardman 3/20 (3 overs)

Perth Scorchers won by 48 runs
Perth Stadium, Perth
Umpires: Gerard Abood and Sam Nogajski
Player of the match: Finn Allen (Perth Scorchers)

- Sydney Sixers won the toss and elected to field.

== Final ==
Final
25 January 2026
19:15 (N)
Scorecard

Sydney Sixers; 132 (20 overs)	v	Perth Scorchers; 4/133 (17.3 overs)
Steve Smith 24 (13); David Payne 3/18 (4 overs)		Mitchell Marsh 44 (43); Sean Abbott 2/19 (4 overs)

Perth Scorchers won by 6 wickets
Perth Stadium, Perth
Umpires: Donovan Koch and Sam Nogajski
Player of the match: David Payne (Perth Scorchers)

- Perth Scorchers won the toss and elected to field.

== Administration and support staff ==
Perth Scorchers staff
Position	Name
Head Coach	Adam Voges
List Management & Strategy	Simon Katich
Assistant Coach	Tim Macdonald
Assistant Coach	Beau Casson
