= 2023–24 Perth Scorchers season =

Perth Scorchers season

Perth Scorchers
2023–24 season
- Coach: Adam Voges
- Captain(s): Ashton Turner; Aaron Hardie
- Home ground: Perth Stadium
- League: BBL
- BBL season: 3rd
- BBL finals: Knock-out 4th Place
- Leading Run Scorer: Aaron Hardie (334)
- Leading Wicket Taker: Jason Behrendorff (16)
- Average home attendance: 35,235

The 2023–24 Perth Scorchers season was the thirteenth in the club's history. Coached by Adam Voges, captained by Ashton Turner, and vice captained by Aaron Hardie. They competed in the 13 season.

The Perth Scorchers are an Australian men's professional Twenty20 franchise cricket team that competes in the Big Bash League. The Scorchers wears a teal uniform and are based in Perth in the Australian state of Western Australia. Their home ground is the Perth Stadium.

== Squad information ==
The squad of the Perth Scorchers for the 2023–24 Big Bash League season as of 5 December 2023.

- Players with international caps are listed in **bold**.

No.	Name	Nationality	Date of birth (age)	Batting style	Bowling style	Notes
Batters
16	**Zak Crawley**	Australia	3 February 1998 (age 28)	Right-handed	—N/a	Overseas Draft Pick (Gold) & International
8	Cooper Connolly	Australia	22 August 2003 (age 23)	Left-handed	Slow left-arm orthodox	
17	**Ashton Turner**	Australia	25 January 1993 (age 33)	Right-handed	Right-arm off break	Captain & International
19	Nick Hobson	Australia	22 August 1994 (age 32)	Left-handed	—N/a	
28	Stephen Eskinazi	England	28 March 1994 (age 32)	Right-handed	—N/a	
32	Laurie Evans	England	12 October 1987 (age 38)	Right-handed	Right-arm fast-medium	Overseas Draft Pick (Silver)
All-rounders
10	**Mitchell Marsh**	Australia	20 October 1991 (age 34)	Right-handed	Right-arm medium	International
21	**Aaron Hardie**	Australia	7 January 1999 (age 27)	Right-handed	Right-arm medium-fast	International
Wicket-keepers
95	**Josh Inglis**	Australia	4 March 1995 (age 31)	Right-handed	—N/a	International
9	Sam Whiteman	Australia	19 March 1992 (age 34)	Left-handed	—N/a	
Pace bowlers
2	**Jhye Richardson**	Australia	20 September 1996 (age 29)	Right-handed	Right-arm fast	International
5	**Jason Behrendorff**	Australia	20 April 1992 (age 34)	Right-handed	Left-arm fast-medium	International
12	Matthew Kelly	Australia	7 December 1994 (age 31)	Right-handed	Right-arm fast-medium	
28	Lance Morris	Australia	28 March 1998 (age 28)	Right-handed	Right-arm fast	Cricket Australia contract
68	**Andrew Tye**	Australia	12 December 1986 (age 39)	Right-handed	Right-arm medium-fast	International
-	Liam Haskett	Australia	31 May 2001 (age 25)	Right-handed	Left-arm medium-fast	
Spin bowlers
18	**Ashton Agar**	Australia	14 October 1993 (age 32)	Left-handed	Slow left-arm orthodox	International
15	Hamish McKenzie	Australia	21 September 1999 (age 26)	Left-handed	Left-arm unorthodox	

== Standings ==
Pos	Team	Pld	W	L	NR	Pts	NRR	Qualification
1	Brisbane Heat (C)	10	7	1	2	16	0.972	Advanced to Qualifier
2	Sydney Sixers	10	6	2	2	14	0.339	Advanced to Qualifier
3	Perth Scorchers	10	6	3	1	13	0.725	Advanced to Knockout
4	Adelaide Strikers	10	5	4	1	11	0.331	Advanced to Knockout
5	Hobart Hurricanes	10	4	6	0	8	−0.268	
6	Melbourne Stars	10	4	6	0	8	−1.051	
7	Melbourne Renegades	10	2	6	2	6	−0.289	
8	Sydney Thunder	10	1	7	2	4	−0.652	

Source: ESPNcricinfo
(C) Champions

== Regular season ==
=== Matches ===
Match 4
10 December 2023
19:15 (N)
Scorecard

Perth Scorchers; 2/30 (6.5 overs)	v	Melbourne Renegades
Aaron Hardie 20* (23); Tom Rogers 1/7 (2 overs)

No result
Kardinia Park, Geelong
Attendance: 6,601
Umpires: Simon Lightbody and Ben Treloar

- Melbourne Renegades won the toss and elected to field.
- Match abandoned due to unsafe pitch.
- Hamish McKenzie (Perth Scorchers) made his T20 debut.

Match 7
13 December 2023
19:15 (N)
Scorecard

Melbourne Stars; 101 (19.1 overs)	v	Perth Scorchers; 3/102 (13.5 overs)
Hilton Cartwright 24 (18); Jason Behrendorff 3/28 (4 overs)		Stephen Eskinazi 25 (25); Joel Paris 1/17 (2 overs)

Perth Scorchers won by 7 wickets
Melbourne Cricket Ground, Melbourne
Attendance: 13,522
Umpires: Shawn Craig and Phillip Gillespie
Player of the match: Hamish McKenzie (Perth Scorchers)

- Perth Scorchers won the toss and elected to field.

Match 9
20 December 2023
16:15 (D/N)
Scorecard

Hobart Hurricanes; 8/172 (20 overs)	v	Perth Scorchers; 1/173 (16.1 overs)
Chris Jordan 59 (20); Jason Behrendorff 4/25 (4 overs)		Aaron Hardie 85* (45); Chris Jordan 1/25 (3 overs)

Perth Scorchers won by 9 wickets
Perth Stadium, Perth
Attendance: 28,494
Umpires: Michael Graham-Smith and Paul Wilson
Player of the match: Jason Behrendorff (Perth Scorchers)

- Hobart Hurricanes won the toss and elected to bat.

Match 15
26 December 2023
18:15 (N)
Scorecard

Perth Scorchers; 162 (19.4 overs)	v	Melbourne Renegades; 8/149 (20 overs)
Josh Inglis 64 (44); Tom Rogers 3/18 (4 overs)		Shaun Marsh 59 (36); Andrew Tye 2/21 (4 overs)

Perth Scorchers won by 13 runs
Perth Stadium, Perth
Attendance: 42,226
Umpires: Shawn Craig and Greg Davidson
Player of the match: Josh Inglis (Perth Scorchers)

- Melbourne Renegades won the toss and elected to field.

Match 25
3 January 2024
18:15 (N)
Scorecard

Perth Scorchers; 4/211 (20 overs)	v	Adelaide Strikers; 169 (19.2 overs)
Laurie Evans 85* (28); Henry Thornton 2/31 (4 overs)		Matthew Short 74 (44); Lance Morris 5/24 (4 overs)

Perth Scorchers won by 42 runs
Perth Stadium, Perth
Attendance: 41,576
Umpires: Gerard Abood and Ben Treloar
Player of the match: Laurie Evans (Perth Scorchers)

- Adelaide Strikers won the toss and elected to field.

Match 27
5 January 2024
18:45 (N)
Scorecard

Perth Scorchers; 7/153 (20 overs)	v	Adelaide Strikers; 1/154 (16.1 overs)
Josh Inglis 39 (25); David Payne 2/22 (3 overs)		Matthew Short 76* (51); Lance Morris 1/25 (3 overs)

Adelaide Strikers won by 9 wickets
Adelaide Oval, Adelaide
Attendance: –
Umpires: Andrew Crozier and Michael Graham-Smith
Player of the match: Matthew Short (Adelaide strikers)

- Adelaide Strikers won the toss and elected to field.

Match 30
8 January 2024
19:15 (N)
Scorecard

Sydney Thunder; 8/137 (20 overs)	v	Perth Scorchers; 3/140 (19.1 overs)
Alex Hales 72 (55); Cooper Connolly 3/25 (4 overs)		Zak Crawley 58 (56); Nathan McAndrew 2/27 (4 overs)

Perth Scorchers won by 7 wickets
Sydney Showground Stadium, Sydney
Attendance: –
Umpires: Troy Penman and Ben Treloar
Player of the match: Ashton Agar (Perth Scorchers)

- Perth Scorchers won the toss and elected to field.

Match 32
10 January 2024
18:40 (N)
Scorecard

Brisbane Heat; 6/191 (20 overs)	v	Perth Scorchers; 9/168 (20 overs)
Michael Neser 64* (30); Ashton Agar 2/29 (4 overs)		Laurie Evans 51 (29); Spencer Johnson 2/23 (4 overs)

Brisbane Heat won by 23 runs
The Gabba, Brisbane
Attendance: –
Umpires: Greg Davidson and David Taylor
Player of the match: Michael Neser (Brisbane Heat)

- Brisbane Heat won the toss and elected to bat.

Match 35
13 January 2024
13:15
Scorecard

Perth Scorchers; 6/163 (20 overs)	v	Brisbane Heat; 128 (19.5 overs)
Nick Hobson 48* (30); Michael Neser 2/21 (3 overs)		Jimmy Peirson 42 (41); Andrew Tye 4/14 (3.5 overs)

Perth Scorchers won by 35 runs
Optus Stadium, Perth
Attendance: 32,583
Umpires: Bruce Oxenford and Nathan Johnstone
Player of the match: Nick Hobson (Perth Scorchers)

- Perth Scorchers won the toss and elected to bat.

Match 39
16 January 2024
16:40 AWST (D/N)
Scorecard

Perth Scorchers; 4/197 (20 overs)	v	Sydney Sixers; 7/201 (20 overs)
Laurie Evans 72 (34); Ben Dwarshuis 2/23 (4 overs)		Daniel Hughes 74 (43); Jason Behrendorff 3/35 (4 overs)

Sydney Sixers won by 3 wickets
Optus Stadium, Perth
Attendance: –
Umpires: Nathan Johnstone and Sam Nogajski
Player of the match: Daniel Hughes (Sydney Sixers)

- Perth Scorchers won the toss and elected to bat.

== Play-offs ==
Knockout
20 January 2024
16:40 AWST (N)
Scorecard

Adelaide Strikers; 7/155 (20 overs)	v	Perth Scorchers; 105 (16.2 overs)
Jake Weatherald 56 (32); Cooper Connolly 2/17 (3 overs)		Sam Fanning 31 (20); Lloyd Pope 4/24 (4 overs)

Adelaide Strikers won by 50 runs
Optus Stadium, Perth
Attendance: –
Umpires: Gerard Abood and Shawn Craig
Player of the match: Lloyd Pope (Adelaide Strikers)

- Perth Scorchers won the toss and elected to field.
