= 2021–22 Perth Scorchers season =

Perth Scorchers season

Perth Scorchers
2021–22 season
- Coach: Adam Voges
- Captain(s): Ashton Turner
- Home ground: Perth Stadium
- BBL Season: 1st
- BBL Finals: Champions (4th title)
- Leading Run Scorer: Kurtis Patterson (391)
- Leading Wicket Taker: Andrew Tye (25)

The 2021–22 Perth Scorchers season was the eleventh in the club's history. Coached by Adam Voges and captained by Mitchell Marsh they competed in the BBL's 2021–22 season. In the final, they beat Sydney Sixers to clinch their fourth BBL title.

== Standings ==
Pos	Team	Pld	W	L	NR	BP	Pts	NRR	Qualification
1	Perth Scorchers (C)	14	11	3	0	7	40	0.926	Advanced to play-off phase
2	Sydney Sixers	14	9	4	1	6	35	1.027	Advanced to play-off phase
3	Sydney Thunder	14	9	5	0	8	35	0.725	Advanced to play-off phase
4	Adelaide Strikers	14	6	8	0	10	28	0.237	Advanced to play-off phase
5	Hobart Hurricanes	14	7	7	0	6	27	−0.332	Advanced to play-off phase
6	Melbourne Stars	14	7	7	0	5	26	−0.222	
7	Brisbane Heat	14	3	11	0	7	16	−0.910	
8	Melbourne Renegades	14	3	10	1	5	16	−1.477	

Source: ESPNcricinfo
(C) Champions

== Regular season ==
The Scorchers only played the first match of their season at their regular home ground of Optus Stadium, due to Western Australia's strict COVID-19 border controls. They played "home" fixtures at Metricon Stadium, Sydney Showgrounds Stadium, GMHBA Stadium, and Marvel Stadium.

The match on Boxing Day against the Melbourne Renegades had the uniquely late start time of 21:15, meaning the match went well past midnight.

Match 5
8 December 2021
18:35 (N)
Scorecard

(H) Perth Scorchers; 6/157 (20 overs)	v	Brisbane Heat; 151 (19.5 overs)
Kurtis Patterson 55 (30); Cameron Gannon 2/32 (4 overs)		Xavier Bartlett 34* (25); Matthew Kelly 4/28 (4 overs)

Perth Scorchers won by 6 runs
Perth Stadium, Perth
Attendance: 16,108
Umpires: Gerard Abood and Greg Davidson
Player of the match: Matthew Kelly (Perth Scorchers)

- Perth Scorchers won the toss and elected to bat.

Match 9
11 December 2021
21:30 (N)
Scorecard

(H) Perth Scorchers; 1/195 (20 overs)	v	Adelaide Strikers; 146 (17.5 overs)
Colin Munro 114* (73)		Matthew Short 63 (47); Andrew Tye 3/21 (3 overs)

Perth Scorchers won by 49 runs
Sydney Showground Stadium, Sydney
Attendance: Closed Event
Umpires: Nathan Johnstone and Tony Wilds
Player of the match: Colin Munro (Perth Scorchers)

- Perth Scorchers won the toss and elected to bat.
- Thomas Kelly (Adelaide Strikers) made his T20 debut.
- X-factor subs: Liam Scott (Adelaide Strikers) replaced Wes Agar.

Match 12
14 December 2021
19:15 (N)
Scorecard

Perth Scorchers; 5/182 (20 overs)	v	Hobart Hurricanes (H); 129 (19 overs)
Mitchell Marsh 100* (60); Nathan Ellis 2/33 (4 overs)		Ben McDermott 41 (29); Tymal Mills 3/23 (4 overs)

Perth Scorchers won by 53 runs
Blundstone Arena, Hobart
Attendance: 5,673
Umpires: Gerard Abood and Donovan Koch
Player of the match: Mitchell Marsh (Perth Scorchers)

- Perth Scorchers won the toss and elected to bat.

Match 15
20 December 2021
16:15 (D/N)
Scorecard

Perth Scorchers; 7/167 (20 overs)	v	Hobart Hurricanes (H); 9/125 (20 overs)
Kurtis Patterson 78 (48); Jordan Thompson 3/33 (4 overs)		Wil Parker 25* (17); Andrew Tye 3/19 (4 overs)

Perth Scorchers won by 42 runs
Blundstone Arena, Hobart
Umpires: Gerard Abood and Tony Wilds
Player of the match: Kurtis Patterson (Perth Scorchers)

- Perth Scorchers won the toss and elected to bat.
- X-factor subs: Jordan Thompson (Hobart Hurricanes) replaced Riley Meredith.

Match 17
22 December 2021
19:15 (N)
Scorecard

Perth Scorchers; 5/206 (20 overs)	v	Melbourne Renegades (H); 5/185 (20 overs)
Mitchell Marsh 86 (53); Kane Richardson 3/33 (4 overs)		Aaron Finch 68 (43); Ashton Agar 2/23 (3 overs)

Perth Scorchers won by 21 runs
Marvel Stadium, Melbourne
Attendance: 9,487
Umpires: Donovan Koch and Ben Treloar
Player of the match: Mitchell Marsh (Perth Scorchers)

- Perth Scorchers won the toss and elected to bat.

Match 21
26 December 2021
21:15 (N)
Scorecard

Melbourne Renegades; 8/151 (20 overs)	v	Perth Scorchers (H); 2/152 (16.5 overs)
Mackenzie Harvey 45 (40); Jason Behrendorff 2/19 (4 overs)		Colin Munro 58* (32); Nic Maddinson 1/5 (1 over)

Perth Scorchers won by 8 wickets
Marvel Stadium, Melbourne
Attendance: 1,785
Umpires: Phillip Gillespie and Nathan Johnstone
Player of the match: Mitchell Marsh (Perth Scorchers)

- Melbourne Renegades won the toss and bat.

Match 24
28 December 2021
19:15 (N)
Scorecard

(H) Sydney Thunder; 7/200 (20 overs)	v	Perth Scorchers; 8/166 (20 overs)
Sam Billings 67 (35); Matthew Kelly 3/30 (4 overs)		Colin Munro 64* (43); Nathan McAndrew 3/40 (4 overs)

Sydney Thunder won by 34 runs
Manuka Oval, Canberra
Umpires: Donovan Koch and David Taylor
Player of the match: Sam Billings (Sydney Thunder)

- Perth Scorchers won the toss and elected to field.
- X-factor subs: Lance Morris (Perth Scorchers) replaced Peter Hatzoglou.

Match 31
2 January 2022
15:30 (D/N)
Scorecard

Perth Scorchers; 8/180 (20 overs)	v	Melbourne Stars (H); 130 (18.5 overs)
Kurtis Patterson 54 (39); Qais Ahmad 2/26 (4 overs)		Joe Clarke 52 (32); Tymal Mills 3/28 (3.5 overs)

Perth Scorchers won by 50 runs
Junction Oval, Melbourne
Umpires: Geoff Davidson and Bruce Oxenford
Player of the match: Peter Hatzoglou (Perth Scorchers)

- Perth Scorchers won the toss and elected to bat.
- Xavier Crone and Tom Rogers (Melbourne Stars) both made their T20 debuts.

Match 34
4 January 2022
18:15 (N)
Scorecard

(H) Perth Scorchers; 8/143 (20 overs)	v	Sydney Sixers; 8/133 (20 overs)
Aaron Hardie 45 (24); Hayden Kerr 4/32 (4 overs)		Dan Christian 73 (61); Andrew Tye 3/17 (4 overs)

Perth Scorchers won by 10 runs
Metricon Stadium, Gold Coast
Umpires: Gerard Abood and Troy Penman
Player of the match: Aaron Hardie (Perth Scorchers)

- Perth Scorchers won the toss and elected to bat.

Match 38
6 January 2022
20:15 (N)
Scorecard

(H) Perth Scorchers; 9/133 (18 overs)	v	Sydney Thunder; 4/137 (17 overs)
Cameron Bancroft 30 (31); Gurinder Sandhu 4/22 (4 overs)		Jason Sangha 34 (26); Andrew Tye 2/38 (4 overs)

Sydney Thunder won by 6 wickets (DLS method)
Metricon Stadium, Gold Coast
Umpires: Gerard Abood and Troy Penman
Player of the match: Gurinder Sandhu (Sydney Thunder)

- Perth Scorchers won the toss and elected to bat.
- Rain stopped play during Perth Scorchers innings. Sydney Thunder were set a revised target of 135 runs from 18 overs due to rain.
- Gurinder Sandhu became the first player to take a hat-trick for the Sydney Thunder.

Match 42
9 January 2022
19:15 (N)
Scorecard

(H) Sydney Sixers; 4/151 (20 overs)	v	Perth Scorchers; 5/152 (19 overs)
Dan Christian 35* (20); Ashton Agar 2/23 (4 overs)		Ashton Turner 69 (41); Ben Dwarshuis 2/34 (4 overs)

Perth Scorchers won by 5 wickets
Coffs Harbour International Stadium, Coffs Harbour
Umpires: Sam Nogajski and Tony Wilds
Player of the match: Ashton Turner (Perth Scorchers)

- Sydney Sixers won the toss and elected to bat.
- Justin Avendano (Sydney Sixers) became the first player to represent multiple clubs in one BBL season, after previously playing for the Melbourne Stars.

Match 27 (Note: Originally the match was scheduled to be played on 30 December 2021 but was postponed due to COVID-19 cases in Melbourne Stars' squad.)
11 January 2022
14:10 (D/N)
Scorecard

(H) Perth Scorchers; 3/196 (20 overs)	v	Melbourne Stars; 9/149 (20 overs)
Laurie Evans 69 (46); Haris Rauf 2/38 (4 overs)		Beau Webster 63 (47); Matthew Kelly 4/25 (4 overs)

Perth Scorchers won by 47 runs
GMHBA Stadium, Geelong
Umpires: Phillip Gillespie and Simon Lightbody
Player of the match: Laurie Evans (Perth Scorchers)

- Perth Scorchers won the toss and elected to bat.
- X-factor subs: Clint Hinchliffe (Melbourne Stars) replaced Brody Couch.

Match 49
14 January 2022
10:10
Scorecard

Perth Scorchers; 9/127 (20 overs)	v	Adelaide Strikers (H); 4/130 (17 overs)
Laurie Evans 39 (31); Fawad Ahmed 3/30 (4 overs)		Ian Cockbain 35* (24); Aaron Hardie 3/31 (4 overs)

Adelaide Strikers won by 6 wickets
Adelaide Oval, Adelaide
Umpires: Michael Graham-Smith and Bruce Oxenford
Player of the match: Fawad Ahmed (Adelaide Strikers)

- Adelaide Strikers won the toss and elected to field.

Match 53
17 January 2022
20:15 (N)
Scorecard

(H) Brisbane Heat; 7/155 (20 overs)	v	Perth Scorchers; 4/156 (18.4 overs)
Max Bryant 81 (56); Peter Hatzoglou 2/17 (4 overs)		Mitchell Marsh 59 (34); Mitchell Swepson 2/19 (4 overs)

Perth Scorchers won by 6 wickets
Marvel Stadium, Melbourne
Attendance: 480
Umpires: Shawn Craig and Ben Treloar
Player of the match: Mitchell Marsh (Perth Scorchers)

- Brisbane Heat won the toss and elected to bat.

== Playoffs ==
Qualifier
22 January 2022
19:15 (N)
Scorecard

(H) Perth Scorchers; 3/189 (20 overs)	v	Sydney Sixers; 141 (19.1 overs)
Josh Inglis 79 (49); Hayden Kerr 2/37 (4 overs)		Ben Dwarshuis 66 (28); Ashton Agar 2/16 (4 overs)

Perth Scorchers won by 48 runs
Marvel Stadium, Melbourne
Umpires: Gerard Abood and Shawn Craig
Player of the match: Josh Inglis (Perth Scorchers)

- Perth Scorchers won by the toss and elected to bat.
- Nicholas Bertus (Sydney Sixers) made his T20 debut.

Final
28 January 2022
19:40 (N)
Scorecard

(H) Perth Scorchers; 6/171 (20 overs)	v	Sydney Sixers; 92 (16.2 overs)
Laurie Evans 76* (41); Nathan Lyon 2/24 (3 overs)		Daniel Hughes 42 (33); Andrew Tye 3/15 (3 overs)

Perth Scorchers won by 79 runs
Marvel Stadium, Melbourne
Umpires: Phillip Gillespie and Sam Nogajski
Player of the match: Laurie Evans (Perth Scorchers)

- Sydney Sixers won the toss and elected to field.
- X-factor subs: Justin Avendano (Sydney Sixers) replaced Jackson Bird.

== Squad ==
The squad for the 2021–22 Big Bash League season.

- Players with international caps are listed in **bold**.
- Ages are given as of the first match of the tournament, 5 December 2021

No.	Name	Nationality	Date of birth (age)	Batting style	Bowling style	Notes
Batsmen
4	Cameron Bancroft	Australia	19 November 1992 (aged 29)	Right-handed	Right-arm off break	International Cap
82	Colin Munro	New Zealand	11 March 1987 (aged 34)	Left-handed	Right-arm medium	Visa Contract and International Cap
82	Laurie Evans	England	12 October 1987 (aged 34)	Left-handed	Right-arm fast medium	Visa Contract and International Cap
41	Kurtis Patterson	Australia	5 April 1993 (age 26)	Left-handed	Right-arm off break	International Cap
All-rounders
18	Ashton Agar	Australia	14 October 1993 (aged 28)	Right-handed	Slow left-arm orthodox	International Cap
10	Mitchell Marsh	Australia	20 October 1991 (aged 30)	Right-handed	Right-arm fast-medium	Captain; International Cap
17	Ashton Turner	Australia	25 January 1993 (aged 28)	Right-handed	Right-arm off break	International Cap
31	Cameron Green	Australia	3 June 1999 (age 21)	Right-handed	Right-arm fast-medium	International Cap
Wicket-keepers
95	Josh Inglis	Australia	4 March 1995 (aged 26)	Right-handed	–	
9	Sam Whiteman	Australia	19 March 1992 (aged 29)	Left-handed	–	
Pace bowlers
5	Jason Behrendorff	Australia	20 April 1990 (aged 31)	Right-handed	Left-arm fast-medium	International Cap
12	Matt Kelly	Australia	7 December 1994 (aged 26)	Right-handed	Right-arm fast-medium	
3	Joel Paris	Australia	11 December 1992 (aged 28)	Left-handed	Left-arm fast-medium	International Cap
2	Jhye Richardson	Australia	20 September 1996 (aged 25)	Right-handed	Right-arm fast	International Cap
68	Andrew Tye	Australia	12 December 1986 (aged 34)	Right-handed	Right-arm medium-fast	Vice Captain; International Cap
21	Cameron Gannon	United States	23 January 1989 (aged 32)	Right-handed	Right-arm fast-medium	International Cap
6	Liam Guthrie	Australia	9 April 1997 (aged 24)	Left-handed	Left-arm fast-medium	Local Replacement
Spin bowlers
27	Peter Hatzoglou	Australia	27 November 1998 (age 22)	Right-handed	Right-arm leg break	
–	Corey Rocchiccioli	Australia	8 October 1997 (aged 24)	Right-handed	Right-arm off break	Local Replacement
