= 2024–25 Perth Scorchers season =

Perth Scorchers season

Perth Scorchers
2024–25 season
- Coach: Adam Voges
- Captain(s): Ashton Turner
- Overseas player: Finn Allen; Matthew Hurst; Keaton Jennings
- Home ground: Perth Stadium
- League: BBL
- BBL season: 5th
- BBL finals: Did not qualify
- Leading Run Scorer: Cooper Connolly (351)
- Leading Wicket Taker: Jason Behrendorff (17)
- Player of the Season: Cooper Connolly

The 2024–25 Perth Scorchers season was the fourteenth season of the club's history. Coached by Adam Voges and captained by Ashton Turner, the club competed in the BBL |14.

The Scorchers finished fifth in the league stage with four wins and six losses and failed to qualify for the finals. Cooper Connolly was the team's leading run-scorer with 351 runs, while Jason Behrendorff was the leading wicket-taker with 17 wickets.

== Background ==
The Perth Scorchers are an Australian men's professional Twenty20 franchise cricket team that competes in the Big Bash League. The Scorchers wear a teal uniform and are based in Perth in the Australian state of Western Australia. Their home ground is Perth Stadium.

Adam Voges continued as head coach and Ashton Turner as captain for the BBL|14 season.

The Scorchers signed Finn Allen as a direct overseas signing, while Matthew Hurst and Keaton Jennings were selected in the BBL draft.

== Current squad ==
- Players with international caps are listed in **bold**.

Perth Scorchers 2024–25
No.	Name	Nat.	Birth Date	Batting Style	Bowling Style	Additional Info.
Batters
32	**Finn Allen**	(New Zealand)	22 April 1999	Right-handed	Right-arm off spin	Overseas Draft Pick
20	Sam Fanning	(Australia)	20 November 2000	Left-handed	Right-arm off spin	
19	Nick Hobson	(Australia)	22 August 1994	Left-handed	Right-arm medium	
39	Keaton Jennings	(England)	20 June 1992	Left-handed	Right-arm off spin	Overseas Draft Pick
All-rounders
18	**Ashton Agar**	(Australia)	14 October 1993	Left-handed	Left-arm orthodox spin	
8	**Cooper Connolly**	(Australia)	22 August 2003	Left-handed	Left-arm orthodox spin	
21	**Aaron Hardie**	(Australia)	7 January 1999	Right-handed	Right-arm fast	
10	**Mitch Marsh**	(Australia)	20 October 1991	Right-handed	Right-arm fast	
17	**Ashton Turner**	(Australia)	25 January 1993	Right-handed	Right-arm off spin	Captain
44	Matthew Spoors	(Australia)	15 October 1999	Right-handed	Right-arm off spin	
Wicket Keepers
48	**Josh Inglis**	(Australia)	4 March 1995	Right-handed	—N/a	
11	Matthew Hurst	(England)	20 November 2001	Right-handed	—N/a	Overseas Draft Pick
Bowlers
40	Mahli Beardman	(Australia)	31 August 2005	Right-handed	Right-arm fast	
34	**Jason Behrendorff**	(Australia)	20 April 1990	Left-handed	Left-arm fast-medium	
24	Bryce Jackson	(Australia)	28 November 1999	Right-handed	Right-arm fast	Replacement player
12	Matthew Kelly	(Australia)	7 December 1994	Right-handed	Right-arm fast	
28	**Lance Morris**	(Australia)	28 March 1998	Right-handed	Right-arm fast	
60	**Jhye Richardson**	(Australia)	20 September 1996	Right-handed	Right-arm fast	
6	**Andrew Tye**	(Australia)	12 December 1986	Right-handed	Right-arm fast	

== League stage ==
On 12 July 2024, Cricket Australia confirmed the full schedule for the tournament.

Match 1
15 December 2024
19:15 (D/N)
Scorecard

Melbourne Stars; 9/146 (20 overs)	v	Perth Scorchers; 4/150 (17.1 overs)
Tom Curran 37 (19); Jhye Richardson 3/19 (4 overs)		Cooper Connolly 64 (51); Tom Curran 1/25 (4 overs)

Perth Scorchers won by 6 wickets
Optus Stadium, Perth
Attendance: 30,469
Umpires: Gerard Abood and Shawn Craig
Player of the match: Jhye Richardson (Perth Scorchers)

- Melbourne Stars won the toss and elected to bat.

Match 2
21 December 2024
16:00 (D/N)
Scorecard

Perth Scorchers; 6/155 (20 overs)	v	Hobart Hurricanes; 2/156 (19.2 overs)
Josh Inglis 49 (35); Riley Meredith 3/27 (4 overs)		Mitchell Owen 101* (64); Jason Behrendorff 2/21 (4 overs)

Hobart Hurricanes won by 8 wickets
Bellerive Oval, Hobart
Attendance: 7,561
Umpires: Simon Lightbody and Benjamin Treloar
Player of the match: Mitchell Owen (Hobart Hurricanes)

- Hobart Hurricanes won the toss and elected to field.

Match 3
23 December 2024
19:15 (D/N)
Scorecard

Perth Scorchers; 8/143 (20 overs)	v	Melbourne Renegades; 8/144 (19 overs)
Cooper Connolly 66 (50); Tom Rogers 3/22 (4 overs)		Jacob Bethell 30 (22); Jason Behrendorff 2/33 (4 overs)

Melbourne Renegades won by 2 wickets
Marvel Stadium, Melbourne
Attendance: 18,014
Umpires: Shawn Craig and Greg Davidson
Player of the match: Tom Rogers (Melbourne Renegades)

- Melbourne Renegades won the toss and elected to field.

Match 4
26 December 2024
21:15 (D/N)
Scorecard

Perth Scorchers; 6/165 (20 overs)	v	Brisbane Heat; 132 (19.4 overs)
Nick Hobson 47* (16); Spencer Johnson 4/20 (4 overs)		Matthew Renshaw 36 (24); Andrew Tye 2/23 (3.4 overs)

Perth Scorchers won by 33 runs
Optus Stadium, Perth
Attendance: 41,921
Umpires: Donovan Koch and Benjamin Treloar
Player of the match: Nick Hobson (Perth Scorchers)

- Brisbane Heat won the toss and elected to field.

Match 5
31 December 2024
19:15 (D/N)
Scorecard

Adelaide Strikers; 8/142 (20 overs)	v	Perth Scorchers; 3/146 (14.3 overs)
Brendan Doggett 47* (39); Jhye Richardson 3/29 (4 overs)		Finn Allen 50 (23); Henry Thornton 2/26 (3 overs)

Perth Scorchers won by 7 wickets
Adelaide Oval, Adelaide
Attendance: 41,624
Umpires: Phillip Gillespie and Sam Nogajski
Player of the match: Cooper Connolly (Perth Scorchers)

- Perth Scorchers won the toss and elected to field.

Match 6
3 January 2025
21:15 (D/N)
Scorecard

Perth Scorchers; 4/177 (20 overs)	v	Sydney Thunder; 6/179 (20 overs)
Finn Allen 68 (31); Chris Green 3/20 (4 overs)		David Warner 49 (33); Lance Morris 3/22 (4 overs)

Sydney Thunder won by 4 wickets
Optus Stadium, Perth
Attendance: 46,471
Umpires: Michael Graham-Smith and David Taylor
Player of the match: Sherfane Rutherford (Sydney Thunder)

- Sydney Thunder won the toss and elected to field.

Match 7
7 January 2025
19:15 (D/N)
Scorecard

Perth Scorchers; 8/147 (20 overs)	v	Melbourne Renegades; 6/150 (19.4 overs)
Ashton Agar 51* (30); Adam Zampa 3/27 (4 overs)		Will Sutherland 70 (45); Lance Morris 2/21 (4 overs)

Melbourne Renegades won by 4 wickets
Optus Stadium, Perth
Attendance: 31,795
Umpires: Shawn Craig and Stephen Dionysius
Player of the match: Tom Rogers (Melbourne Renegades)

- Melbourne Renegades won the toss and elected to field.

Match 8
11 January 2025
16:45 (D/N)
Scorecard

Sydney Sixers; 3/220 (20 overs)	v	Perth Scorchers; 7/206 (20 overs)
Steve Smith 121* (64); Cooper Connolly 1/27 (3 overs)		Ashton Turner 66* (32); Sean Abbott 4/43 (4 overs)

Sydney Sixers won by 14 runs
Sydney Cricket Ground, Sydney
Attendance: 31,165
Umpires: Phillip Gillespie and Roberto Howard
Player of the match: Steve Smith (Sydney Sixers)

- Perth Scorchers won the toss and elected to field.

Match 9
13 January 2025
19:30 (D/N)
Scorecard

Sydney Thunder; 7/158 (20 overs)	v	Perth Scorchers; 97 (17.2 overs)
Sam Konstas 53 (42); Lance Morris 3/43 (4 overs)		Aaron Hardie 22 (17); Chris Green 3/13 (4 overs)

Sydney Thunder won by 61 runs
ENGIE Stadium, Sydney
Attendance: 10,213
Umpires: Mike Graham-Smith and David Taylor
Player of the match: Tom Andrews (Sydney Thunder)

- Perth Scorchers won the toss and elected to field.

Match 10
18 January 2025
20:15 (D/N)
Scorecard

Adelaide Strikers; 161 (19.1 overs)	v	Perth Scorchers; 5/163 (16.2 overs)
Liam Scott 67 (43); Mahli Beardman 3/17 (3 overs)		Cooper Connolly 39* (21); D'Arcy Short 2/37 (3.2 overs)

Perth Scorchers won by 5 wickets
Optus Stadium, Perth
Attendance: 41,878
Umpires: Greg Davidson and Mike Graham-Smith
Player of the match: Jason Behrendorff (Perth Scorchers)

- Perth Scorchers won the toss and elected to field.

== Standing ==
=== Points table ===
Pos	Team	Pld	W	L	NR	Pts	NRR	Qualification
1	Hobart Hurricanes (C)	10	7	2	1	15	−0.120	Advanced to the Qualifier
2	Sydney Sixers	10	6	2	2	14	0.156	Advanced to the Qualifier
3	Sydney Thunder (R)	10	5	3	2	12	0.340	Advanced to the Knockout
4	Melbourne Stars	10	5	5	0	10	0.135	Advanced to the Knockout
5	Perth Scorchers	10	4	6	0	8	0.219	
6	Melbourne Renegades	10	4	6	0	8	0.139	
7	Brisbane Heat	10	3	6	1	7	−0.831	
8	Adelaide Strikers	10	3	7	0	6	−0.122	

Source: ESPNcricinfo
(C) Champions; (R) Runners-up

== Administration and support staff ==
Perth Scorchers staff
Position	Name
Head Coach	Adam Voges
Assistant Coach	Tim Macdonald
Assistant Coach	Beau Casson
