= 2022–23 Perth Scorchers season =

Perth Scorchers season

Perth Scorchers
2022–23 season
- Coach: Adam Voges
- Captain(s): Ashton Turner
- Home ground: Perth Stadium
- Highest home attendance: 53,886
- Lowest home attendance: 21,042
- Average home attendance: 31,160

The 2022–23 Perth Scorchers season was the twelfth in the club's history. Coached by Adam Voges and captained by Ashton Turner they competed in the Big Bash League's 2022–23 season, BBL|12.

== Standings ==
Pos	Team	Pld	W	L	NR	Pts	NRR	Qualification
1	Perth Scorchers (C)	14	11	3	0	22	1.205	Advanced to play-off phase
2	Sydney Sixers	14	10	3	1	21	0.846	Advanced to play-off phase
3	Melbourne Renegades	14	7	7	0	14	−0.027	Advanced to play-off phase
4	Sydney Thunder	14	7	7	0	14	−0.716	Advanced to play-off phase
5	Brisbane Heat	14	6	7	1	13	−0.483	Advanced to play-off phase
6	Hobart Hurricanes	14	6	8	0	12	−0.340	
7	Adelaide Strikers	14	5	9	0	10	−0.151	
8	Melbourne Stars	14	3	11	0	6	−0.287	

Source: ESPNcricinfo
(C) Champions

== Squad information ==
The current squad of the Perth Scorchers for the 2022–23 Big Bash League season as of 22 February 2022.

Team	Playing squad
Perth Scorchers	Ashton Agar, Cameron Bancroft, Ashton Turner (c), Jason Behrendorff, Cooper Connolly, Faf du Plessis, Stephen Eskinazi, Cameron Green, Aaron Hardie, Peter Hatzoglou, Nick Hobson, Josh Inglis, Matt Kelly, Adam Lyth, Hamish McKenzie, Lance Morris, Jhye Richardson

== Regular season ==
Match 6
17 December 2022
16:05 (D/N)
Scorecard

(H) Perth Scorchers; 9/155 (20 overs)	v	Sydney Sixers; 117 (20 overs)
Aaron Hardie 55 (32); Jackson Bird 3/26 (4 overs)		Hayden Kerr 42 (35); Jhye Richardson 4/9 (4 overs)

Perth Scorchers won by 38 runs
Perth Stadium, Perth
Attendance: 21,042
Umpires: Shawn Craig and Bruce Oxenford
Player of the match: Jhye Richardson (Perth Scorchers)

- Perth Scorchers won the toss and elected to bat

Match 8
19 December 2022
19:15 (N)
Scorecard

(H) Hobart Hurricanes; 8/172 (20 overs)	v	Perth Scorchers; 8/164 (20 overs)
Matthew Wade 51 (29); Jhye Richardson 3/26 (4 overs)		Josh Inglis 62 (37); Patrick Dooley 4/16 (4 overs)

Hobart Hurricanes won by 8 runs
York Park, Launceston
Attendance: 5,342
Umpires: Greg Davidson and Michael Graham-Smith
Player of the match: Patrick Dooley (Hobart Hurricanes)

- Hobart Hurricanes won the toss and elected to bat.

Match 12
23 December 2022
15:30 (D/N)
Scorecard

Perth Scorchers; 7/229 (20 overs)	v	Melbourne Stars (H); 8/168 (20 overs)
Josh Inglis 74 (33); Luke Wood 5/50 (4 overs)		Beau Webster 43 (32); Jason Behrendorff 3/32 (4 overs)

Perth Scorchers won by 61 runs
Junction Oval, Melbourne
Attendance: 3,697
Umpires: Simon Lightbody and Paul Wilson
Player of the match: Josh Inglis (Perth Scorchers)

- Perth Scorchers won the toss and elected to bat.

Match 16
26 December 2022
18:15 (N)
Scorecard

Adelaide Strikers; 7/133 (20 overs)	v	Perth Scorchers (H); 7/136 (19.1 overs)
Chris Lynn 35 (34); Andrew Tye 3/30 (4 overs)		Ashton Turner 48* (38); Matt Short 2/11 (2 overs)

Perth Scorchers won by 3 wickets
Perth Stadium, Perth
Attendance: 26,211
Umpires: Gerard Abood and Nathan Johnstone
Player of the match: Ashton Turner (Perth Scorchers)

- Adelaide Strikers won the toss and elected to bat.

Match 20
29 December 2022
18:15 (N)
Scorecard

Melbourne Stars; 135 (20 overs)	v	Perth Scorchers (H); 4/136 (17.3 overs)
Hilton Cartwright 36 (32); Jhye Richardson 4/25 (4 overs)		Ashton Turner 53 (26); Luke Wood 2/29 (3.3 overs)

Perth Scorhers won by 6 wickets
Perth Stadium, Perth
Attendance: 27,752
Umpires: Ben Treloar and Sam Nogajski
Player of the match: Jhye Richardson (Perth Scorchers)

- Melbourne Stars won the toss and elected to bat

Match 24
1 January 2023
13:40 (D/N)
Scorecard

(H) Melbourne Renegades; 6/155 (20 overs)	v	Perth Scorchers; 5/156 (19.4 overs)
Aaron Finch 65 (48); Andrew Tye 3/32 (4 overs)		Josh Inglis 47 (34); Kane Richardson 2/21 (4 overs)

Perth Scorchers won by 5 wickets
Docklands Stadium, Melbourne
Attendance: 9,027
Umpires: Bruce Oxenford and Shawn Craig
Player of the match: Josh Inglis (Perth Scorchers)

- Melbourne Renegades won the toss and elected to bat.

Match 29
4 January 2023
18:15 (N)
Scorecard

(H) Perth Scorchers; 9/142 (20 overs)	v	Sydney Thunder; 4/143 (17 overs)
Ashton Turner 61 (37); Nathan McAndrew 3/29 (4 overs)		Oliver Davies 58 (47); Jhye Richardson 2/36 (3.4 overs)

Sydney Thunder won by 6 wickets
Perth Stadium, Perth
Attendance: 24,182
Umpires: Michael Johnstone and Michael Graham-Smith
Player of the match: Oliver Davies (Sydney Thunder)

- Perth Scorchers won the toss and elected to bat.
- Joel Davies (Sydney Thunder) made his T20 debut.

Match 33
7 January 2023
18:15 (N)
Scorecard

Brisbane Heat; 9/171 (20 overs)	v	Perth Scorchers (H); 3/173 (16.3 overs)
Colin Munro 45 (26); Andrew Tye 3/37 (4 overs)		Cameron Bancroft 76* (48); Mark Steketee 1/35 (2.3 overs)

Perth Scorchers won by 7 wickets
Perth Stadium, Perth
Attendance: 28,029
Umpires: Ben Treloar and Simon Lightbody
Player of the match: Cameron Bancroft (Perth Scorchers)

- Perth Scorchers won the toss and elected to field
- Cooper Connolly (Perth Scorchers) made his T20 debut.

Match 37
11 January 2023
18:40 (N)
Scorecard

(H) Brisbane Heat; 6/155 (20 overs)	v	Perth Scorchers; 2/157 (16.2 overs)
Max Bryant 36 (27); Jason Behrendorff 3/21 (4 overs)		Josh Inglis 67* (35); Xavier Bartlett 1/31 (3 overs)

Perth Scorchers won by 8 wickets
The Gabba, Brisbane
Attendance: 16,816
Umpires: Eloise Sheridan and Michael Graham-Smith
Player of the match: Jason Behrendorff (Perth Scorchers)

- Perth Scorchers won the toss and elected to field.
- Spencer Johnson (Brisbane Heat) made his T20 debut.

Match 39
13 January 2023
18:30 (N)
Scorecard

(H) Sydney Thunder; 111 (19 overs)	v	Perth Scorchers; 1/112 (12.5 overs)
Oliver Davies 52 (36); Andrew Tye 3/27 (4 overs)		Cameron Bancroft 55* (40); Nathan McAndrew 1/17 (3 overs)

Perth Scorchers won by 9 wickets
Sydney Showground Stadium, Sydney
Umpires: Simon Lightbody and Paul Wilson
Player of the match: Andrew Tye (Perth Scorchers)

- Perth Scorchers won the toss and elected to field.

Match 43
15 January 2023
19:15 (N)
Scorecard

(H) Sydney Sixers; 5/151 (20 overs)	v	Perth Scorchers; 7/145 (20 overs)
Josh Philippe 54 (48); Peter Hatzoglou 2/27 (4 overs)		Stephen Eskinazi 66* (54); Sean Abbott 3/18 (4 overs)

Sydney Sixers won by 6 runs
Sydney Cricket Ground, Sydney
Attendance: 20,304
Umpires: Ben Treloar and Paul Wilson
Player of the match: Sean Abbott (Sydney Sixers)

- Perth Scorchers won the toss and elected to field.

Match 46
18 January 2023
16:40 (N)
Scorecard

Hobart Hurricanes; 9/146 (20 overs)	v	Perth Scorchers (H); 3/147 (17.3 overs)
Tom Andrews 27 (21); Lance Morris 2/21 (4 overs)		Aaron Hardie 90* (62); Riley Meredith 2/35 (4 overs)

Perth Scorchers won by 7 wickets
Perth Stadium, Perth
Attendance: 25,956
Umpires: Greg Davidson and Phillip Gillespie
Player of the match: Aaron Hardie (Perth Scorchers)

- Hobart Hurricanes won the toss and elected to bat.

Match 48
20 January 2023
16:00 (N)
Scorecard

(H) Adelaide Strikers; 92 (17 overs)	v	Perth Scorchers; 3/94 (11.1 overs)
Adam Hose 30 (23); Peter Hatzoglou 3/14 (3 overs)		Aaron Hardie 43 (30); Cameron Boyce 2/12 (3 overs)

Perth Scorchers won by 7 wickets
Adelaide Oval, Adelaide
Attendance: 19,751
Umpires: Nathan Johnstone and Troy Penman
Player of the match: David Payne (Perth Scorchers)

- Adelaide Strikers won the toss and elected to bat.

Match 52
22 January 2023
16:15 (N)
Scorecard

(H) Perth Scorchers; 5/212 (20 overs)	v	Melbourne Renegades; 5/202 (20 overs)
Cameron Bancroft 95* (50); Matt Critchley 2/34 (4 overs)		Aaron Finch 76* (35); Ashton Turner 2/25 (3 overs)

Perth Scorchers won by 10 runs
Perth Stadium, Perth
Attendance: 32,259
Umpires: Donovan Koch and Paul Wilson
Player of the match: Cameron Bancroft (Perth Scorchers)

- Melbourne Renegades won the toss and elected to field.

== Play-offs ==
=== Matches ===
Qualifier
28 January 2023
16:15 (N)
Scorecard

Sydney Sixers; 8/151 (20 overs)	v	Perth Scorchers; 3/154 (18.3 overs)
Moises Henriques 58 (43); David Payne 3/33 (4 overs)		Ashton Turner 84* (47); Sean Abbott 3/25 (4 overs)

Perth Scorchers won by 7 wickets
Perth Stadium, Perth
Attendance: 41,126
Umpires: Donovan Koch and Paul Wilson
Player of the match: Ashton Turner (Perth Scorchers)

- Sydney Sixers won the toss and elected to bat.

Final
4 February 2023
16:30 (D/N)
Scorecard

Brisbane Heat; 7/175 (20 overs)	v	Perth Scorchers; 5/178 (19.2 overs)
Nathan McSweeney 41 (37); Jason Behrendorff 2/26 (4 overs)		Ashton Turner 53 (32); Matthew Kuhnemann 1/28 (4 overs)

Perth Scorchers won by 5 wickets
Perth Stadium, Perth
Attendance: 53,886
Umpires: Sam Nogajski and Paul Wilson
Player of the match: Ashton Turner (Perth Scorchers)

- Brisbane Heat won the toss and elected to bat.
