= 2015–16 Perth Scorchers season =

Perth Scorchers season

Perth Scorchers
2015–16 season
- Coach: Justin Langer
- Captain(s): Adam Voges
- Home ground: WACA Ground, Perth
- BBL: 3rd
- BBL finals: Semi-finalist
- Leading Wicket Taker: Andrew Tye (13)
- Highest home attendance: 20,870
- Lowest home attendance: 19,225
- Average home attendance: 20,273 (home matches)

== Ladder ==
Pos	Team	Pld	W	L	NR	Pts	NRR	Qualification
1	Adelaide Strikers	8	7	1	0	14	0.544	Advanced to semi-finals
2	Melbourne Stars	8	5	3	0	10	0.366	Advanced to semi-finals
3	Perth Scorchers	8	5	3	0	10	0.181	Advanced to semi-finals
4	Sydney Thunder (C)	8	4	4	0	8	0.375	Advanced to semi-finals
5	Melbourne Renegades	8	3	5	0	6	−0.041	
6	Brisbane Heat	8	3	5	0	6	−0.204	
7	Hobart Hurricanes	8	3	5	0	6	−0.955	
8	Sydney Sixers	8	2	6	0	4	−0.330	

(C) Champions

== Ladder progress ==
Round	1	2	3	4	5	6	7	8
Ground	H	H	A	H	A	A	A	H
Result	L	W	W	W	L	W	W	L
Position	6	4	2	1	2	2	1	3

Source: Competitive Matches
A = Away; H = Home; W = Win; D = Draw; L = Lose

== Regular season ==
21 December
16:10
Scorecard

(H) Perth Scorchers; 6/151 (20 overs)	v	Adelaide Strikers; 6/152 (19.1 overs)
Shaun Marsh 47 (35); Ben Laughlin 2/20 (3 overs)		Mahela Jayawardene 42 (40); David Willey 2/24 (4 overs)

Adelaide Strikers won by 4 wickets
#TheFurnace
Attendance: 20,553
Umpires: Gerard Abood and Mick Martell
Player of the match: Adil Rashid (Strikers)

- Perth Scorchers won the toss and elected to bat.

26 December
16:10
Scorecard

Brisbane Heat; 7/117 (20 overs)	v	Perth Scorchers (H); 1/118 (15.1 overs)
Chris Lynn 75* (58); Andrew Tye 3/23 (4 overs)		Michael Klinger 53* (42); Andrew Fekete 1/16 (2 overs)

Perth Scorchers won by 9 wickets
#TheFurnace
Attendance: 19,225
Umpires: Shawn Craig and Michael Graham-Smith
Player of the match: David Willey (Scorchers)

- Brisbane Heat won the toss and elected to bat.

30 December
19:10 (D/N)
Scorecard

(H) Melbourne Renegades; 4/170 (20 overs)	v	Perth Scorchers; 0/171 (18.4 overs)
Aaron Finch 72 (48); Jason Behrendorff 2/14 (4 overs)		Michael Klinger 90* (58)

Perth Scorchers won by 10 wickets
Etihad Stadium
Attendance: 26,787
Umpires: Gerard Abood and Phillip Gillespie
Player of the match: Michael Klinger (Scorchers)

- Perth Scorchers won the toss and elected to field.
- This was the first ever 10-wicket win in a BBL match.
- The crowd of 26,787 is the highest crowd at Etihad Stadium for a non-derby BBL match.
- Michael Klinger and Shaun Marsh's unbeaten 171-run partnership is the highest partnership for the Scorchers in their history and the second highest overall.

2 January
18:15 (D/N)
Scorecard

Sydney Sixers; 8/112 (20 overs)	v	Perth Scorchers (H); 1/114 (14.3 overs)
Michael Lumb 47 (45); David Willey 3/22 (4 overs)		Shaun Marsh 63* (54); Sean Abbott 1/11 (1 over)

Perth Scorchers won by 9 wickets
#TheFurnace
Attendance: 20,444
Umpires: Ashley Barrow and Paul Wilson
Player of the match: David Willey (Scorchers)

- Sydney Sixers won the toss and elected to bat.
- William Somerville (Sixers) made his T20 debut.

5 January
19:10 (D/N)
Scorecard

(H) Adelaide Strikers; 2/174 (20 overs)	v	Perth Scorchers; 138 (17.3 overs)
Mahela Jayawardene 57 (37); Ashton Agar 1/12 (2 overs)		David Willey 31 (17); Adil Rashid 3/23 (4 overs)

Adelaide Strikers won by 36 runs
Adelaide Oval
Attendance: 46,633
Umpires: Shawn Craig and Greg Davidson
Player of the match: Travis Head (Strikers)

- Adelaide Strikers won the toss and elected to bat.
- Jake Lehmann (Strikers) made his T20 debut.

7 January
19:40 (D/N)
Scorecard

Perth Scorchers; 5/175 (20 overs)	v	Sydney Thunder (H); 9/145 (20 overs)
Cameron Bancroft 72 (53); Andre Russell 2/31 (4 overs)		Andre Russell 42 (20); Andrew Tye 3/22 (4 overs)

Perth Scorchers won by 30 runs
Spotless Stadium
Attendance: 18,942
Umpires: Greg Davidson and Paul Wilson
Player of the match: Cameron Bancroft (Scorchers)

- Sydney Thunder won the toss and elected to field.

10 January
16:20
Scorecard

Perth Scorchers; 5/173 (20 overs)	v	Hobart Hurricanes (H); 6/172 (20 overs)
Michael Carberry 62 (35); Shaun Tait 2/29 (4 overs)		Tim Paine 57 (47); Ashton Agar 2/38 (4 overs)

Perth Scorchers won by 1 run
Blundstone Arena
Attendance: 18,149
Umpires: Ashley Barrow and Paul Wilson
Player of the match: Michael Carberry (Scorchers)

- Perth Scorchers won the toss and elected to bat.
- The crowd of 18,149 is the highest ever crowd for any sport at Blundstone Arena.

16 January
18:15 (D/N)
Scorecard

Melbourne Stars; 9/146 (20 overs)	v	Perth Scorchers (H); 94 (19 overs)
David Hussey 36 (25); Matt Dixon 3/32 (4 overs)		Adam Voges 46* (51); Daniel Worrall 3/15 (4 overs)

Melbourne Stars won by 52 runs
#TheFurnace
Attendance: 20,870
Umpires: Phillip Gillespie and Geoff Joshua
Player of the match: Ben Hilfenhaus (Stars)

- Perth Scorchers won the toss and elected to field.
- Jhye Richardson (Scorchers) made his T20 debut.
- The crowd of 20,870 is the highest crowd for a BBL at this ground.

== Knockout phase ==
Semifinals
1	Adelaide Strikers (H)	7/159 (20 ov)
4	Sydney Thunder	2/160 (17.4 ov)
3	Perth Scorchers	7/139 (20 ov)
2	Melbourne Stars	3/140 (18.1 ov)

Final
2	Melbourne Stars
4	Sydney Thunder

== Semi-finals ==
The top four teams from the group stage qualified for the semi-finals.

22 January
19:40 (D/N)
Scorecard

Perth Scorchers; 7/139 (20 overs)	v	Melbourne Stars (H); 3/140 (18.1 overs)
Adam Voges 52 (40); Daniel Worrall 3/25 (4 overs)		Kevin Pietersen 62 (36); Brad Hogg 1/20 (4 overs)

Melbourne Stars won by 7 wickets
Melbourne Cricket Ground
Attendance: 30,174
Umpires: Geoff Joshua and Sam Nogajski
Player of the match: Kevin Pietersen (Stars)

- Melbourne Stars won the toss and elected to field.

== Current squad ==
Players with international caps are listed in bold.

- Ages are given as of 17 December 2015, the date of the opening match of the tournament

No.	Name	Nationality	Date of birth	Batting style	Bowling style	Notes
	Batsmen					
32	**Adam Voges**	Australia	4 October 1979 (aged 36)	Right-handed	Left arm orthodox	Captain
6	Cameron Bancroft	Australia	19 November 1992 (aged 23)	Right-handed	–	
20	**Shaun Marsh**	Australia	9 July 1983 (aged 32)	Left-handed	Left arm orthodox	
7	Michael Klinger	Australia	4 July 1980 (aged 35)	Right-handed	–	
15	**Michael Carberry**	England	29 September 1980 (aged 35)	Left-handed	Right-arm offbreak	International Player
14	Marcus Harris	Australia	21 July 1992 (aged 23)	Left-handed	Right-arm offbreak	
	All-rounders					
13	**Nathan Coulter-Nile**	Australia	11 October 1987 (aged 28)	Right-handed	Right-arm fast	
31	**Brad Hogg**	Australia	6 February 1971 (aged 44)	Left-handed	Slow left-arm wrist-spin	
10	**Mitchell Marsh**	Australia	20 October 1990 (aged 25)	Right-handed	Right-arm fast medium	
17	Ashton Turner	Australia	25 January 1993 (aged 22)	Right-handed	Right-arm offbreak	
	Wicket-keepers					
9	Sam Whiteman	Australia	19 March 1992 (aged 23)	Left-handed	–	
	Bowlers					
5	Jason Behrendorff	Australia	20 April 1990 (aged 25)	Right-handed	Left-arm fast medium	
33	Simon Mackin	Australia	1 September 1992 (aged 23)	Right-handed	Right-arm fast medium	
68	Andrew Tye	Australia	12 December 1986 (aged 29)	Right-handed	Right-arm medium fast	
3	Joel Paris	Australia	11 December 1992 (aged 23)	Left-handed	Left-arm fast medium	
18	**Ashton Agar**	Australia	14 October 1993 (aged 22)	Left-handed	Left arm orthodox	
8	**David Willey**	England	28 February 1990 (aged 25)	Left-handed	Left-arm fast medium	International Player
67	**James Muirhead**	Australia	30 July 1993 (aged 22)	Right-handed	Right-arm leg spin	

== Home attendance ==
Game	Opponent	Attendance
6	Adelaide Strikers	20,553
9	Brisbane Heat	19,225
17	Sydney Sixers	20,444
31	Melbourne Stars	20,870
Total Attendance		81,092
Average Attendance		20,273
