= List of Australia Twenty20 International cricketers =

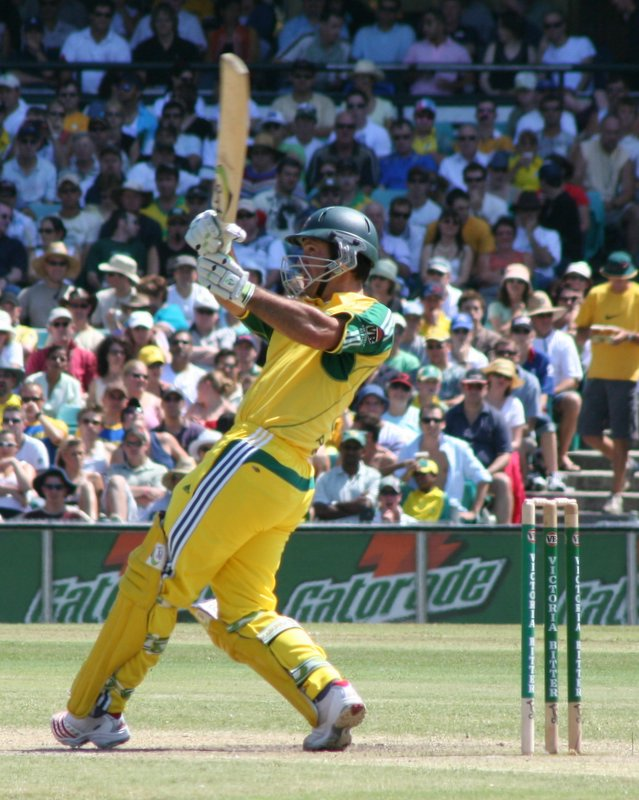
Ricky Ponting served as Australia's first captain in Twenty20 Internationals.

Since their first match in 2005, 116 players have represented Australia in Twenty20 Internationals. A Twenty20 International is an international cricket match between two representative teams, as determined by the International Cricket Council (ICC). A Twenty20 International is played under the rules of Twenty20 cricket. The list is arranged in the order in which each player won his first Twenty20 cap. Where more than one player won his first Twenty20 cap in the same match, those players are listed alphabetically by surname.

Australia played against New Zealand in the first ever Twenty20 International.

== Key ==
General

- ‡ – Captain
- † – Wicket-keeper
- First – Year of debut
- Last – Year of latest game
- Mat – Number of matches played

Batting

- Runs – Runs scored in career
- HS – Highest score
- 100 – Centuries scored
- 50 – Half-centuries scored
- Avg – Runs scored per dismissal
- * – Batsman remained not out

Bowling

- Balls – Balls bowled in career
- Wkt – Wickets taken in career
- BBI – Best bowling in an innings
- Ave – Average runs per wicket

Fielding

- Ca – Catches taken
- St – Stumpings taken

== Players ==
Statistics are correct as of 17 June 2026.

Australia T20I cricketers
General					Batting					Bowling				Fielding		Ref
Cap	Name	First	Last	Mat	Runs	HS	Avg	50	100	Balls	Wkt	BBI	Ave	Ca	St	Ref
1	Michael Clarke ‡	2005	2010	34	488	67	21.21	1	0	156	6	1/2	37.50	13	0	
2	Adam Gilchrist ‡†	2005	2008	13	272	48	22.66	0	0	—	—	—	—	17	0	
3	James Hopes	2005	2010	12	105	30	21.00	0	0	222	10	2/26	28.30	3	0	
4	Michael Hussey	2005	2012	38	721	60*	37.94	4	0	6	0	—	—	20	0	
5	Michael Kasprowicz	2005	2005	2	3	3*	—	0	0	42	5	4/29	11.40	2	0	
6	Simon Katich	2005	2006	3	69	39	34.50	0	0	—	—	—	—	2	0	
7	Brett Lee	2005	2012	25	101	43*	16.83	0	0	545	28	3/23	25.50	6	0	
8	Damien Martyn	2005	2006	4	120	96	30.00	1	0	—	—	—	—	1	0	
9	Glenn McGrath	2005	2005	2	5	5	2.50	0	0	48	5	3/31	15.80	1	0	
10	Ricky Ponting ‡	2005	2009	17	401	98*	28.64	2	0	—	—	—	—	8	0	
11	Andrew Symonds	2005	2009	14	337	85*	48.14	2	0	185	8	2/14	34.62	3	0	
12	Jason Gillespie	2005	2005	1	24	24	24.00	0	0	24	1	1/49	49.00	0	0	
13	Matthew Hayden	2005	2007	9	308	73*	51.33	4	0	—	—	—	—	1	0	
14	Nathan Bracken	2006	2009	19	15	4*	5.00	0	0	377	19	3/11	23.05	6	0	
15	Stuart Clark	2006	2007	9	—	—	—	–	—	216	13	4/20	18.23	4	0	
16	Brad Haddin ‡†	2006	2014	34	402	47	17.47	0	0	—	—	—	—	17	6	
17	Mick Lewis	2006	2006	2	—	—	—	–	—	45	4	2/18	12.25	1	0	
18	Brad Hogg	2006	2014	15	55	41	13.75	0	0	294	7	2/31	53.28	1	0	
19	Shane Watson ‡	2006	2016	58	1,462	124*	29.24	10	1	930	48	4/15	24.72	20	0	
20	Shane Harwood	2007	2009	3	0	0*	—	0	0	72	3	2/21	37.66	0	0	
21	Ben Hilfenhaus	2007	2012	7	2	2	1.00	0	0	156	9	2/15	17.88	0	0	
22	Cameron White ‡	2007	2014	47	984	85*	32.80	5	0	42	1	1/11	51.00	23	0	
23	Brad Hodge	2007	2014	15	183	36	26.14	0	0	30	1	1/13	43.00	5	0	
24	Mitchell Johnson	2007	2013	30	109	28*	10.90	0	0	656	38	3/15	20.97	5	0	
25	Ashley Noffke	2007	2008	2	0	0	0.00	0	0	45	4	3/18	10.25	0	0	
26	Luke Pomersbach	2007	2007	1	15	15	15.00	0	0	—	—	—	—	0	0	
27	Shaun Tait	2007	2016	21	11	6	2.75	0	0	478	28	3/13	21.03	3	0	
28	Adam Voges	2007	2013	7	139	51	46.33	1	0	12	2	2/5	2.50	3	0	
29	David Hussey	2008	2012	39	756	88*	22.90	3	0	361	19	3/25	20.63	24	0	
30	Shaun Marsh	2008	2016	15	255	47*	18.21	0	0	—	—	—	—	3	0	
31	Luke Ronchi †	2008	2009	3	47	36	23.50	0	0	—	—	—	—	0	0	(Note: Luke Ronchi has also played Twenty20 International cricket for New Zealand and the World XI. Only his record for Australia is given above.)
32	David Warner ‡	2009	2024	110	3,277	100*	33.43	28	1	—	—	—	—	62	0	
33	Callum Ferguson	2009	2009	3	16	8	5.33	0	0	—	—	—	—	1	0	
34	Moises Henriques	2009	2021	24	355	62*	22.88	2	0	138	7	3/22	27.71	6	0	(Note: Moises Henriques has also played Twenty20 International cricket for Portugal. Only his record for Australia is given above.)
35	Peter Siddle	2009	2010	2	1	1*	—	0	0	48	3	2/24	19.33	0	0	
36	Brett Geeves	2009	2009	1	—	—	—	–	—	20	2	2/35	17.50	0	0	
37	Ben Laughlin	2009	2013	3	—	—	—	–	—	71	2	1/32	59.00	1	0	
38	Nathan Hauritz	2009	2009	3	6	4	3.00	0	0	44	2	1/20	23.50	1	0	
39	Marcus North	2009	2009	1	20	20	20.00	0	0	—	—	—	—	0	0	
40	Dirk Nannes	2009	2010	15	16	12*	16.00	0	0	318	27	4/18	14.92	1	0	(Note: Dirk Nannes has also played Twenty20 International cricket for the Netherlands. Only his record for Australia is given above.)
41	Tim Paine †	2009	2017	10	47	21	7.83	0	0	—	—	—	—	10	2	(Note: Tim Paine has also played Twenty20 International cricket for the World XI. Only his record for Australia is given above.)
42	Travis Birt	2010	2012	4	31	17	10.33	0	0	—	—	—	—	1	0	
43	Steve Smith ‡	2010	2024	67	1,094	90	24.86	5	0	291	17	3/20	22.17	41	0	
44	Dan Christian	2010	2021	23	118	39	14.75	0	0	279	13	3/27	30.61	6	0	
45	Ryan Harris	2010	2010	3	2	2*	—	0	0	70	4	2/27	23.75	0	0	
46	Steve O'Keefe	2010	2011	7	32	22	6.40	0	0	114	6	3/29	24.83	1	0	
47	John Hastings	2010	2016	9	46	15	11.50	0	0	186	7	3/14	35.28	2	0	
48	Clint McKay	2010	2013	6	19	7	9.50	0	0	136	4	2/24	45.75	0	0	
49	Aaron Finch ‡	2011	2022	103	3,120	172	34.28	19	2	12	0	—	—	50	0	
50	Doug Bollinger	2011	2014	9	1	1*	—	0	0	210	9	1/22	27.66	2	0	
51	Pat Cummins	2011	2024	57	158	28	10.53	0	0	1,254	66	3/15	23.57	16	0	
52	James Pattinson	2011	2012	4	5	5*	—	0	0	78	3	2/17	34.66	3	0	
53	Matthew Wade ‡†	2011	2024	92	1,202	80	26.13	3	0	—	—	—	—	58	6	
54	Mitchell Marsh ‡	2011	2026	86	2,233	103*	33.32	13	1	300	17	3/24	22.76	37	0	
55	George Bailey ‡	2012	2017	29	470	63	26.11	2	0	—	—	—	—	10	0	(Note: George Bailey has also played Twenty20 International cricket for the World XI. Only his record for Australia is given above.)
56	Xavier Doherty	2012	2013	11	18	9*	18.00	0	0	228	10	3/20	30.00	0	0	
57	James Faulkner	2012	2017	24	159	41*	14.45	0	0	515	36	5/27	19.00	11	0	
58	Glenn Maxwell	2012	2026	130	2,897	145*	28.97	12	5	1,117	51	3/10	29.70	62	0	
59	Mitchell Starc	2012	2024	65	98	14	9.80	0	0	1,458	79	4/20	23.81	22	0	
60	Ben Cutting	2013	2014	4	35	29	11.66	0	0	66	1	1/18	99.00	5	0	(Note: Ben Cutting has also played Twenty20 International cricket for the World XI. Only his record for Australia is given above.)
61	Nathan Coulter-Nile	2013	2019	28	150	34	13.63	0	0	582	34	4/31	23.58	13	0	
62	Josh Hazlewood	2013	2025	60	29	13*	9.66	0	0	1,348	79	4/12	21.26	13	0	
63	Ben Rohrer	2013	2013	1	16	16	16.00	0	0	—	—	—	—	0	0	
64	Fawad Ahmed	2013	2013	2	3	3*	—	0	0	48	3	3/25	22.66	0	0	
65	Nic Maddinson	2013	2018	6	45	34	11.25	0	0	—	—	—	—	1	0	
66	Chris Lynn	2014	2018	18	291	44	19.40	0	0	—	—	—	—	3	0	
67	James Muirhead	2014	2014	5	4	3	4.00	0	0	90	6	2/13	18.16	3	0	
68	Sean Abbott	2014	2026	29	50	13*	8.33	0	0	532	33	4/31	24.90	16	0	
69	Cameron Boyce	2014	2016	7	4	3	4.00	0	0	138	8	2/10	19.00	0	0	
70	Phillip Hughes	2014	2014	1	6	6	6.00	0	0	—	—	—	—	0	0	
71	Kane Richardson	2014	2023	36	17	9	4.25	0	0	756	45	4/30	23.53	14	0	
72	Ben Dunk †	2014	2017	5	99	32	19.80	0	0	—	—	—	—	5	2	
73	Nathan Reardon	2014	2014	2	4	4	4.00	0	0	—	—	—	—	0	0	
74	Marcus Stoinis	2015	2026	87	1,416	78	30.78	6	0	905	53	4/23	25.22	24	0	
75	Travis Head ‡	2016	2026	53	1,335	91	28.40	6	0	36	1	1/16	56.00	9	0	
76	Scott Boland	2016	2016	3	—	—	—	–	—	66	3	3/26	30.00	1	0	
77	Nathan Lyon	2016	2018	2	4	4*	—	0	0	30	1	1/33	48.00	0	0	
78	Andrew Tye	2016	2021	32	83	20	10.37	0	0	683	47	4/23	21.21	10	0	
79	Cameron Bancroft †	2016	2016	1	0	0*	—	0	0	—	—	—	—	1	0	
80	Usman Khawaja	2016	2016	9	241	58	26.77	1	0	—	—	—	—	5	0	
81	Peter Nevill †	2016	2016	9	25	10*	25.00	0	0	—	—	—	—	2	1	
82	Adam Zampa	2016	2026	116	80	13*	4.70	0	0	2,491	150	5/19	20.34	16	0	
83	Ashton Agar	2016	2024	49	279	29	11.62	0	0	1,042	49	6/30	23.04	32	0	
84	Michael Klinger	2017	2017	3	143	62	47.66	1	0	—	—	—	—	2	0	
85	Billy Stanlake	2017	2019	19	9	7	9.00	0	0	420	27	4/8	20.14	0	0	
86	Ashton Turner	2017	2023	19	110	24	12.22	0	0	78	4	2/12	20.50	7	0	
87	Jhye Richardson	2017	2022	18	45	11	15.00	0	0	396	19	3/26	29.26	10	0	
88	Jason Behrendorff	2017	2024	17	7	5	7.00	0	0	318	18	4/21	24.61	7	0	
89	Alex Carey †	2018	2025	42	267	37*	11.12	0	0	—	—	—	—	22	10	
90	D'Arcy Short	2018	2020	23	642	76	30.57	4	0	114	3	1/13	50.33	8	0	
91	Mitchell Swepson	2018	2022	8	32	14*	—	0	0	150	11	3/12	18.54	4	0	
92	Jack Wildermuth	2018	2018	2	1	1*	—	0	0	18	1	1/16	32.00	1	0	
93	Ben McDermott	2018	2023	25	342	54	18.00	2	0	—	—	—	—	15	0	
94	Peter Handscomb †	2019	2019	2	33	20*	33.00	0	0	—	—	—	—	0	0	
95	Daniel Sams	2020	2022	10	106	41	26.50	0	0	180	7	2/33	43.57	4	0	
96	Josh Philippe †	2021	2026	17	186	45	12.40	0	0	—	—	—	—	2	0	
97	Riley Meredith	2021	2024	6	—	—	—	–	—	137	9	3/48	24.66	0	0	
98	Nathan Ellis	2021	2026	37	39	12	7.80	0	0	771	55	4/12	18.18	12	0	
99	Josh Inglis ‡†	2022	2026	47	1,005	110	27.16	2	2	—	—	—	—	30	3	
100	Ben Dwarshuis	2022	2026	15	63	17	7.87	0	0	342	22	4/36	24.36	1	0	
101	Cameron Green	2022	2026	28	638	62*	29.00	6	0	231	14	3/35	25.00	25	0	
102	Marnus Labuschagne	2022	2022	1	2	2	2.00	0	0	—	—	—	—	1	0	
103	Tim David	2022	2026	72	1,622	102*	34.51	9	1	164	5	1/18	51.00	42	0	(Note: Tim David has also played Twenty20 International cricket for Singapore. Only his record for Australia is given above.)
104	Aaron Hardie	2023	2025	16	180	28*	22.50	0	0	240	13	3/21	26.61	6	0	
105	Spencer Johnson	2023	2026	9	0	0	0.00	0	0	172	15	5/26	16.60	0	0	
106	Tanveer Sangha	2023	2023	7	2	2*	—	0	0	168	10	4/31	24.90	1	0	
107	Matthew Short	2023	2026	24	416	66	20.80	1	0	108	9	5/22	22.88	16	0	
108	Chris Green	2023	2023	1	2	2*	—	0	0	24	0	—	—	2	0	
109	Xavier Bartlett	2024	2026	22	73	34*	10.42	0	0	548	24	3/13	22.83	13	0	
110	Jake Fraser-McGurk	2024	2025	8	115	50	14.37	1	0	—	—	—	—	8	0	
111	Cooper Connolly	2024	2026	12	75	47	10.71	0	0	150	3	1/24	77.00	4	0	
112	Mitchell Owen	2025	2026	15	179	50	17.90	1	0	30	2	1/14	29.50	4	0	
113	Matthew Kuhnemann	2025	2026	8	7	5	2.33	0	0	162	3	1/27	73.33	0	0	
114	Mahli Beardman	2026	2026	1	—	—	—	–	—	24	2	2/33	16.50	0	0	
115	Jack Edwards	2026	2026	1	5	5	5.00	0	0	12	0	—	—	1	0	
116	Matt Renshaw	2026	2026	7	138	65	23.00	1	0	18	2	2/26	13.00	1	0	
117	Nikhil Chaudhary	2026	2026	1	18	18	18.00	0	0	12	1	1/14	14.00	2	0	
118	Joel Davies	2026	2026	1	7	7	7.00	0	0	18	3	3/17	5.66	0	0	

== Captains ==
Australia T20I captains
No.	Name	First	Last	Matches	Won	Lost	Tied	No Result	Win% (Note: Percentage is worked out by counting tied games as half a win and excluding no results from the equation.)
1	Ricky Ponting	2005	2009	17	7	10	0	0	41.17
2	Adam Gilchrist	2007	2007	2	1	1	0	0	50.00
3	Michael Clarke	2007	2010	18	12	4	1	1	73.52
4	Brad Haddin	2009	2009	2	1	1	0	0	50.00
5	Cameron White	2011	2011	6	2	4	0	0	33.33
6	George Bailey	2012	2014	28	14	13	1	0	51.78
7	Aaron Finch	2014	2022	76	40	32	1	3	55.47
8	Steve Smith	2015	2016	8	4	4	0	0	50.00
9	Shane Watson	2016	2016	1	0	1	0	0	0.00
10	David Warner	2016	2018	9	8	1	0	0	88.88
11	Matthew Wade	2020	2024	13	4	9	0	0	30.76
12	Mitchell Marsh	2023	2026	39	27	9	0	3	75.00
13	Travis Head	2024	2026	4	1	3	0	0	25.00
14	Josh Inglis	2024	2024	3	3	0	0	0	100.00

== See also ==
- List of Australian Test cricketers
- List of Australian ODI cricketers
