= Perth Scorchers =

Men's cricket team

- Nickname: Scorchers
- League: Big Bash League
- Association: Cricket Australia

Personnel
- Captain: Ashton Turner
- Coach: Adam Voges
- Owner: WA Cricket

Team information
- City: Perth, Western Australia
- Colours: Orange
- Founded: 2011; 15 years ago
- Home ground: Perth Stadium
- Capacity: 60,000

History
- Big Bash League wins: 6 (BBL |03, BBL |04, BBL |06, BBL |11, BBL |12, BBL |15)
- Official website: perthscorchers.com.au
Playing kit (2025-26)

Season
- 2011–12 • 2012–13 • 2013–14 • 2014–15 • 2015–16 • 2016–17 • 2017–18 • 2018–19 • 2019–20 • 2020–21 • 2021–22 • 2022–23 • 2023–24 • 2024–25 • 2025–26 • 2026–27

The Perth Scorchers are an Australian men's professional Twenty20 (T20) franchise cricket team that competes in the Australian Big Bash League (BBL) competition. The Scorchers wear an orange uniform and are based in Perth, Western Australia (WA). Their home ground since 2018 is Perth Stadium, having previously been a tenant of the WACA Ground. They are the defending champions, having won BBL|15.

The Scorchers are the most successful team in BBL history, winning a record six titles to date and being runners-up on three occasions. After losing to the Sydney Sixers and Brisbane Heat in BBL|01 and BBL|02 respectively, they won the next two consecutive titles, becoming the first team to achieve the feat in the league's early history. These wins came against the Hobart Hurricanes, and the Sydney Sixers in a last-ball thriller at Canberra's Manuka Oval. The Scorchers are also the most successful T20 franchise cricket team globally.

== History ==
=== 2011–2012: BBL01 season ===
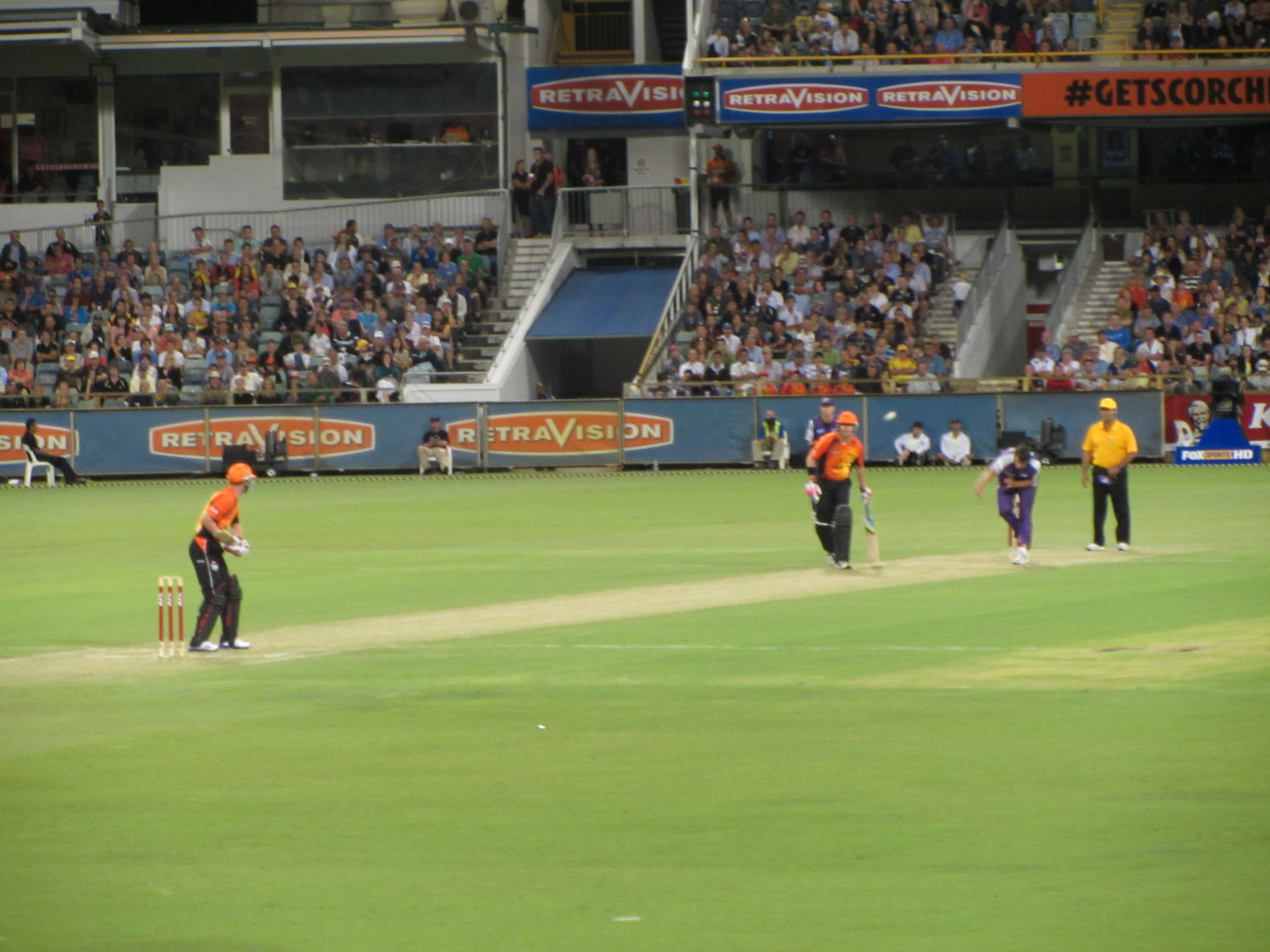
Perth Scorchers taking on Hobart Hurricanes at the WACA Ground in 2011

The majority of the initial Scorchers squad was recruited from the Western Australia cricket team, with the addition of West Australian Simon Katich and international imports South Africa's Herschelle Gibbs and England's Paul Collingwood. Brad Hogg was recruited despite having not played state or international cricket since the 2007–08 season.

The Scorchers started the 2011–12 Big Bash League season poorly, losing to the Hobart Hurricanes in their opening game at the WACA Ground by 31 runs. However, they subsequently won 5 games in a row, finishing the season at the top of the ladder and securing a home final. The Scorchers then won the semi-final against the Melbourne Stars by 11 runs but lost to the Sydney Sixers in the final by 7 wickets.

==== 2012 Champions League ====
By finishing in the top two of the Big Bash League, they won a position at the 2012 Champions League Twenty20 tournament, held in South Africa in October 2012. The team performed poorly, only winning one game. The Marsh brothers, Shaun and Mitchell were both dropped from the final game after excessively celebrating Mitchell's 21st birthday during the tournament.

=== 2012–2013: BBL02 season ===
For the 2012–13 season, Collingwood did not return, and when their first choice overseas player Albie Morkel was unavailable, new coach Justin Langer recruited South African all-rounder Alfonso Thomas, who he had previously played with at Somerset. Other squad changes included the return of Adam Voges and the departure of Nathan Rimmington and Luke Ronchi. Tasmanian Tom Triffitt was recruited as the wicket keeper. Pat Cummins was recruited from the 2011–12 winning Sydney Sixers, but was injured whilst playing for the Sixers at the 2012 Champions League Twenty20 and did not play for the Scorchers.

The Scorchers again started the season poorly, losing to the Melbourne Stars in their second match when they scored an Australian record low team total of 69 runs. However, as they did in the previous season, they recovered and won five of the next six games in a row, finishing in second position and securing a home final against the Melbourne Stars. In a rain-affected semi-final, the Scorchers won by 8 wickets off the final ball of the innings. They hosted the grand final against the Brisbane Heat but were defeated by 34 runs.

==== 2013 Champions League ====
The Scorchers again qualified for the 2013 Champions League Twenty20 tournament, but with a squad depleted by injury and a lack of player availability, again performed poorly, losing all three of their matches to finish bottom of their group.

=== 2013–2014: BBL03 season ===
For their third BBL season, the Scorchers retained the services of senior players Simon Katich, Brad Hogg, Adam Voges, Shaun Marsh and Mitchell Marsh, but lost Michael Hussey and Marcus North to the two Sydney-based teams. South African Alfonso Thomas returned as an international player, but new signing Dwayne Smith from the West Indies did not travel to Perth for personal reasons. He was replaced in the team by Yasir Arafat from Pakistan.

The Scorchers finished third with five wins from eight games and defeated the Sydney Sixers in their semi-final at the Sydney Cricket Ground to advance to the final. The fourth-placed Hobart Hurricanes defeated the Melbourne Stars in the other semi-final, affording the Scorchers the hosting rights for their third consecutive final. The Scorchers finally won their first BBL title, and brought silverware to Western Australian cricket for the first time in over a decade.

==== Final ====
7 February 2014
16:45 (D/N)
Scorecard

Perth Scorchers (H); 4/191 (20 overs)	v	Hobart Hurricanes; 7/152 (20 overs)
Shaun Marsh 63* (43); Evan Gulbis 1/14 (1 over)		George Bailey 58 (32); Brad Hogg 2/17 (4 overs)

Perth Scorchers won by 39 runs
Western Australia Cricket Association Ground, Perth
Attendance: 20,783
Umpires: Mick Martell and John Ward
Player of the match: Brad Hogg (Perth)

- Perth Scorchers won the toss and elected to bat.

=== 2014–2015: BBL04 season ===
Adam Voges was elected to captain the team after the retirement of Simon Katich, while Englishman Michael Carberry signed on for the season as an international recruit, and also regained the services of Yasir Arafat. For the fourth straight year, the Scorchers made it to the final of the Big Bash League, after finishing in 2nd place and defeating the Melbourne Stars in the semi-final for the third time. However, the final was not played at the WACA Ground and was instead played at Manuka Oval due to World Cup and tri-series constraints, despite Perth technically earning a Home final after finishing ahead of their finals opponents the Sydney Sixers. The rematch of the BBL01 final came down to the last ball, with the Scorchers needing a run to win. After a brilliant last over from Brett Lee in his final cricket game which included 2 wickets, a fumbled run-out on the last ball handed the Scorchers their second title.

==== Final ====
Final
28 January
19:40 (D/N)
Scorecard

Sydney Sixers; 5/147 (20 overs)	v	Perth Scorchers; 6/148 (20 overs)
Moises Henriques 77 (57); Jason Behrendorff 1/19 (4 overs)		Shaun Marsh 73 (59); Brett Lee 3/25 (4 overs)

Perth Scorchers won by 4 wickets
Manuka Oval, Canberra
Attendance: 11,837
Umpires: Mick Martell and Paul Wilson
Player of the match: Shaun Marsh (Scorchers)

- Sydney Sixers won the toss and elected to bat

=== 2015–2016: BBL05 season ===
Adam Voges retained his role as captain, while Michael Carberry and David Willey became the two international players. On 30 December 2015 the Scorchers completed the first ever 10-wicket win in BBL history against Melbourne Renegades. They maintained their record of qualifying for every Big Bash finals series, but lost to the Melbourne Stars in the semi-final, making this season the only one in which the Scorchers failed to qualify for the final, and ending their hopes of a third successive trophy.

=== 2016–2017: BBL06 season ===
Mitchell Johnson, having retired from international cricket, joined the Scorchers. Crowd favourite Brad Hogg left the Scorchers to join the Melbourne Renegades. In the semi-final, Johnson took three wickets for three runs from his four overs, a BBL record low runs conceded, and the third best in all Twenty20 history. He was economical again in the final, conceding only 13 runs as Perth won their third BBL trophy, against the Sydney Sixers.

==== Final ====
Final
28 January
16:15
Scorecard

Sydney Sixers; 9/141 (20 overs)	v	Perth Scorchers (H); 1/144 (15.5 overs)
Brad Haddin 38 (25); Jhye Richardson 3/30 (4 overs)		Michael Klinger 71* (49); Nathan Lyon 1/28 (4 overs)

Perth Scorchers won by 9 wickets
WACA Ground
Attendance: 21,832
Umpires: Mick Martell and Paul Wilson
Player of the match: Jhye Richardson (Scorchers)

- Perth Scorchers won the toss and elected to field.
- The crowd of 21,832 is the highest ever for a BBL match at the WACA.

=== 2017–2018: BBL07 season ===
The Scorchers unveiled an updated logo ready for the upcoming seventh Big Bash season. Unusually, they decided to only recruit a single overseas player, David Willey who would return for his third season. Mitchell Marsh took over the captaincy from Michael Klinger.

The Scorchers finished atop the table with eight wins in their ten matches and welcomed the Hobart Hurricanes to Perth Stadium for the semifinal. Winning the toss and electing to field first, a depleted Scorchers bowling unit had no answers for the bats of Matthew Wade and Ben McDermott, surrendering 210 runs in the innings. The bats never got going as the Scorchers could only answer with 139 runs before their tenth wicket fell in the 18th over.

=== 2018–2019: BBL08 season ===
Aside from Adam Voges moving from playing to coaching, the Scorchers returned most of their roster from BBL07, as well as adding Pakistani bowler Usman Qadir. However, very little would go right for them in this tournament. Struggles from key players like Klinger and Hilton Cartwright, as well as varying absences of Ashton Agar, Jason Behrendorff, and Jhye Richardson contributed to a poor season with only four wins in 14 matches. This would place the Scorchers last in the table, failing to qualify for the finals for the first time in BBL and get the wooden spoon.

=== 2019–2020: BBL09 season ===
The Scorchers roster saw significant overhaul preceding BBL09, which included the retirement of Klinger as well as the departures of Cartwright, Nathan Coulter-Nile, and Shaun Marsh. Notable additions included bowlers Fawad Ahmed and Matthew Kelly, batsmen Nick Hobson and Kurtis Patterson, and English imports Chris Jordan and Liam Livingstone. Ahmed and Jordan proved effective additions with 15 wickets each, and Livingstone made for a dynamic opening partnership with Josh Inglis. Depth was an issue, however, and the Scorchers would finish with six wins in 14 matches, just one point behind the Hurricanes and Thunder for a spot in the now expanded BBL playoff.

=== 2020–2021: BBL10 season ===
The Scorchers loaded up on import bats for BBL10, returning Livingstone as well as bringing on Joe Clarke, Colin Munro, and Jason Roy. Ashton Turner took over the captaincy for this tournament. The Scorchers stumbled out of the gates, with three defeats and a no result in their first four matches. They ended the skid with a New Year's Eve victory over the Adelaide Strikers and would go on to win eight of the last ten matches and finish second on the table behind the Sydney Sixers. Munro had a strong tournament that earned him a spot on the ESPNcricinfo BBL team of the season. He was joined by Jhye Richardson, who led the tournament with 29 wickets. The Scorchers fell to the Sixers in the Qualifier before cruising to a 49 run victory over the Brisbane Heat in the Challenger. This earned them a rematch against the Sixers in the Final. Scorchers bowling was unable to contain the opposition's bats as the Sixers won by 27 runs to claim consecutive BBL titles.

==== Final ====
6 February 2021
19:40 (N)
Scorecard

Sydney Sixers; 6/188 (20 overs)	v	Perth Scorchers; 9/161 (20 overs)
James Vince 95 (60); Andrew Tye 2/29 (4 overs)		Liam Livingstone 45 (35); Ben Dwarshuis 3/37 (4 overs)

Sydney Sixers won by 27 runs
Sydney Cricket Ground, Sydney
Attendance: 25,295
Umpires: Sam Nogajski and Paul Wilson
Player of the match: James Vince (Sydney Sixers)

- Perth Scorchers won the toss and elected to field.

=== 2021–2022: BBL11 season ===
The Scorchers retained most of their key players going into BBL11. Whilst they lost imports Livingstone, Clarke, and Roy, they brought in English batter Laurie Evans and fast bowler Tymal Mills. However, the Scorchers would face a unique challenge in this tournament. After an opening victory over Brisbane Heat in Perth, the Scorchers were forced to play all of their remaining games on the road due to Western Australia's tightened travel requirements in response to the ongoing COVID-19 pandemic. Undeterred, the squad started the tournament on a blistering pace with wins in their first six matches. The Scorchers would go on to finish atop the table with 11 wins in 14 matches. Marsh, Agar, and Tye all had stellar tournaments and were named to the ESPNcricinfo BBL team of the season. In the Qualifier, the Scorchers cruised to a handy 48 run victory over the Sixers. In the Final six days later, the Scorchers again faced a Sixers squad depleted by injury and COVID-19. With outstanding bowling and an audacious partnership between Evans and Turner, the Scorchers defeated the Sixers by 79 runs to win their record fourth BBL title.

==== Final ====
28 January 2022
19:40 (N)
Scorecard

Perth Scorchers; 6/171 (20 overs)	v	Sydney Sixers; 92 (16.2 overs)
Laurie Evans 76* (41); Nathan Lyon 2/24 (3 overs)		Daniel Hughes 42 (33); Andrew Tye 3/15 (3 overs)

Perth Scorchers won by 79 runs
Docklands Stadium, Melbourne
Attendance: 10,333
Umpires: Sam Nogajski and Phillip Gillespie
Player of the match: Laurie Evans (Perth Scorchers)

- Sydney Sixers won the toss and elected to field.

=== 2022–2023: BBL12 season ===
Due to a number of factors, the Scorchers lost numerous key pieces from BBL11's championship squad. Opener Patterson signed with the Sixers, while Munro was taken by the Heat in the inaugural BBL international draft. The Scorchers made three picks in the draft and none would play in the tournament. Evans, the 12th overall pick, had his contract terminated on 11 November after testing positive for a banned substance. Phil Salt, the 19th overall pick, withdrew from the tournament due to injury on 2 December, while Marsh was ruled out of the tournament on the same day. Mills, the 30th and final pick of the draft, withdrew on 15 December for personal reasons that were later revealed to be a stroke suffered by his daughter. To cover for these losses, the Scorchers signed South African batter Faf du Plessis as well as English batters Adam Lyth and Stephen Eskinazi. Despite the personnel losses, the Scorchers started the tournament strong. The Scorchers finished the season on top of the season ladder playing the Sydney Sixers in Perth in the Qualifier match and beating them by 7 wickets on the back of a 132* run partnership between captain Ashton Turner and opener Cam Bancroft to reach the BBL final for the eighth time.

They played the Brisbane Heat a week later in the BBL12 Decider, winning by 5 wickets with 4 balls remaining. On a very hot day at Perth Stadium in front of a record Scorchers and BBL Finals crowd of 53,886, Brisbane set a competitive target of 175. In the run chase, every Scorchers' batsman reached double figures, but only Turner scored a half century, with 53 runs from 32 balls until he was run out. It was then left to the inexperienced Nick Hobson and teenager Cooper Connolly to score the remaining 39 runs from the last 19 balls. Connolly, in only his second BBL innings, scored 25 runs off 11 balls including 2 sixes before Hobson finished the task with a six and a four to give the Scorchers their fifth Big Bash title.

==== Final ====
4 February 2023
16:30 (N)
Scorecard

Brisbane Heat; 7/175 (20 overs)	v	Perth Scorchers; 5/178 (19.2 overs)
Nathan McSweeney 41* (37); Jason Behrendorff 2/26 (4 overs)		Ashton Turner 53 (32); Matthew Kuhnemann 1/28 (4 overs)

Perth Scorchers won by 5 wickets
Perth Stadium
Attendance: 53,866
Umpires: Sam Nogajski and Paul Wilson
Player of the match: Ashton Turner (Perth Scorchers)

- Brisbane Heat won the toss and elected to bat.

=== 2023–2024: BBL13 season ===
For the second year in a row, Perth Scorchers lost a key opening batter – Bancroft signed with the Sydney Thunder – and declined to use a platinum pick in the international draft. They did, however, bring in several English batters. With the 16th pick, they selected Zak Crawley, followed by bringing back Evans with the 17th pick. Scorchers also retained Eskinazi and brought back Sam Whiteman, who had spent the previous two campaigns with Sydney Thunder. Marsh would miss his second consecutive Big Bash, this time due to test duties.

Following an opening no-result against Renegades in Geelong, Scorchers started strong with victories in their first four completed matches. In the second of those, facing Hobart Hurricanes, Turner came up limping after bowling his first delivery and exited the match. It was thereafter announced that Turner had aggravated a meniscus injury in his right knee, requiring surgery that would take him out of the tournament. Aaron Hardie would assume the captaincy in his stead. Scorchers experienced an uneven second half of the competition, losing three of their last five matches as they struggled to find an effective opening partnership. Jhye Richardson would also be lost to injury in this period. With the tournament reduced from 14 to 10 matches for each team and a four-team final, Scorchers finished third on the table to set up a showdown against Adelaide Strikers in the Eliminator, in which they were bowled out for just 105 runs.

=== 2024–2025: BBL14 season ===
Perth began the season with a win over the Melbourne Stars, chasing 146 with contributions from Cooper Connolly and Ashton Turner in the first match of the campaign. Throughout the league phase, the Scorchers’ form was inconsistent, finishing with 4 wins and 6 losses, placing them fifth on the ladder and outside the finals positions in the condensed 10-match season format. Key performances included several strong batting displays and notable contributions from emerging players. Cooper Connolly was among the competition’s highest run-scorers early in the season. However, deficit performances against teams like the Sydney Thunder and others saw Perth fail to secure enough victories to qualify for the finals. Many of these losses were close, struggling to finish games off. This was shown as they had the highest net run rate in the competition, although missing out on finals. On a bright note, young gun Cooper Connolly won the Player of the Tournament.

== Seasons ==
=== Season summaries ===
Season	W–L	Pos.	Finals	Coach	Captain	Most Runs	Most Wickets	Most Valuable Player	Refs
2011–12	5–2*	1st*	RU	Mickey Arthur	Marcus North	Mitch Marsh – 309	Ben Edmondson – 14	–	
2012–13	5–3	2nd	RU	Justin Langer	Simon Katich	Shaun Marsh – 412*	Alfonso Thomas – 14	–	
2013–14	5–3	3rd	C	Justin Langer	Simon Katich	Simon Katich – 314	Yasir Arafat – 12	–	
2014–15	5–3	2nd	C	Justin Langer	Adam Voges	Michael Klinger – 326*	Jason Behrendorff – 15 (Note: Yasir Arafat also took 15 wickets, but at a higher bowling average.)	–	
2015–16	5–3	3rd	SF	Justin Langer	Adam Voges (Note: Michael Klinger stood in as acting captain for five games.)	Michael Klinger – 285	Andrew Tye – 13	David Willey	
2016–17	5–3*	1st*	C	Justin Langer	Adam Voges (Note: Michael Klinger stood in as acting captain for three games.)	Michael Klinger – 334	Mitchell Johnson – 13	Andrew Tye	
2017–18	8–2*	1st*	SF	Justin Langer	Adam Voges (Note: Ashton Turner stood in as acting captain for one game.)	Ashton Turner – 252	Andrew Tye – 16	Ashton Agar	
2018–19	4–10	8th	DNQ	Adam Voges	Mitch Marsh (Note: Ashton Turner and Michael Klinger stood in as acting captain for seven games and one game respectively.)	Ashton Turner – 378	Andrew Tye – 17	Ashton Turner	
2019–20	6–8	6th	DNQ	Adam Voges	Mitch Marsh	Liam Livingstone – 425	Fawad Ahmed – 15 (Note: Chris Jordan and Jhye Richardson also took 15 wickets, but at a higher bowling average.)	Jhye Richardson	
2020–21	8–5	2nd	RU	Adam Voges	Ashton Turner	Colin Munro – 443	Jhye Richardson – 29*	Jhye Richardson	
2021–22	11–3*	1st*	C	Adam Voges	Ashton Turner	Kurtis Patterson – 391	Andrew Tye – 25	Ashton Agar	
2022–23	11–3*	1st*	C	Adam Voges	Ashton Turner	Aaron Hardie – 460*	Andrew Tye – 26	Aaron Hardie	
2023–24	6–3	3rd	KF	Adam Voges	Ashton Turner (Note: Aaron Hardie was appointed as captain after three games due to an injury to Ashton Turner.)	Aaron Hardie – 334	Jason Behrendorff – 16	Aaron Hardie	
2024–25	4–6	5th	DNQ	Adam Voges	Ashton Turner	Cooper Connolly – 351	Jason Behrendorff – 17*	Cooper Connolly* (Note: Joint player of the tournament with Glenn Maxwell.)	
2025-26	11–3*	1st*	C	Adam Voges	Ashton Turner	Finn Allen – 466*	Cooper Connolly – 15	Finn Allen	

Legend
DNQ	Did not qualify	CF	Lost the Challenger	*	Led the league
EF	Lost the Eliminator	SF	Semi-finalists	^	League record
KF	Lost the Knockout	RU	Runners-up	C	Champions

=== Tournament finishes ===
Chart of yearly table positions for Perth Scorchers in BBL

Season	League standing	Final standing
2011–12	1st out of 8	Runners-up
2012–13	2nd out of 8	Runners-up
2013–14	3rd out of 8	Champions
2014–15	2nd out of 8	Champions
2015–16	3rd out of 8	Semi-finals
2016–17	1st out of 8	Champions
2017–18	1st out of 8	Semi-finals
2018–19	8th out of 8	Did not qualify
2019–20	6th out of 8	Did not qualify
2020–21	2nd out of 8	Runners-up
2021–22	1st out of 8	Champions
2022–23	1st out of 8	Champions
2023–24	3rd out of 8	Knockout
2024–25	5th out of 8	Did not qualify
2025–26	1st out of 8	Champions

- C: Champions
- RU: Runners-up
- SF: Team qualified for the semi-finals

=== Statistics ===
Season	Played	Wins	Losses	Tied/NR
2011–12	7	5	2	0
2012–13	8	5	3	0
2013–14	8	5	3	0
2014–15	8	5	3	0
2015–16	8	5	3	0
2016–17	8	5	3	0
2017–18	10	8	2	0
2018–19	14	4	10	0
2019–20	14	6	8	0
2020–21	13	8	5	0
2021–22	14	11	3	0
2022–23	14	11	3	0
2023–24	9	6	3	0
2024–25	10	4	6	0
2025–26	12	9	3	0
Source: ESPNcricinfo

== Captaincy records ==
There have been seven captains in the Scorchers' history, including matches featuring an acting captain.

Captain	Span	M	Won	Lost	Tied	NR	W–L%
Marcus North	2011–12	13	7	5	0	1	58.33
Simon Katich	2012–14	24	13	10	0	1	56.52
Adam Voges	2014–18	34	22	12	0	0	64.71
Mitchell Marsh	2014–20	21	7	14	0	0	30
Michael Klinger	2015–19	9	6	3	0	0	66.67
Ashton Turner	2018–25	82	54	26	0	2	67.5
Aaron Hardie	2023–24	8	4	4	0	0	50

== Home grounds ==
Venue	Games hosted by season															
Venue	01	02	03	04	05	06	07	08	09	10	11	12	13	14	15	Total
Optus Stadium	0	0	0	0	0	0	1	7	7	4	1	9	6	5	7	47
WACA Ground	5	6	5	5	4	6	5	0	0	0	0	0	0	0	0	36

== Current squad ==
The squad of the Perth Scorchers for the 2026–27 Big Bash League season as of 23 October 2026.

- Players with international caps are listed in **bold**.

No.	Name	Nat.	Birth Date	Batting Style	Bowling Style	Additional Info.
Batters
16	**Zak Crawley**	England	3 February 1998 (age 28)	Right-handed	Right-arm off spin	International Signing
All-rounders
18	**Ashton Agar**	Australia	14 October 1993 (age 33)	Left-handed	Left-arm orthodox spin	
8	**Cooper Connolly**	Australia	22 August 2003 (age 23)	Left-handed	Left-arm orthodox spin	
21	**Aaron Hardie**	Australia	7 January 1999 (age 27)	Right-handed	Right-arm fast	
30	Calvin Harrison	England	29 April 1998 (age 28)	Right-handed	Right-arm leg spin	International Signing
32	Will Malajczuk	Australia	23 September 2007 (age 19)	Left-handed	Right-arm off spin	
10	**Mitch Marsh**	Australia	20 October 1991 (age 35)	Right-handed	Right-arm fast	
17	**Ashton Turner**	Australia	25 January 1993 (age 33)	Right-handed	Right-arm off spin	Captain
Wicket Keepers
5	Joel Curtis	Australia	4 November 1999 (age 27)	Left-handed	—N/a	
12	**Aneurin Donald**	England	20 December 1996 (age 29)	Right-handed	—N/a	International Signing
Bowlers
4	**Mahli Beardman**	Australia	31 August 2005 (age 21)	Right-handed	Right-arm fast	
24	Brody Couch	Australia	5 December 1999 (age 26)	Left-handed	Right-arm fast	
28	**Lance Morris**	Australia	28 March 1998 (age 28)	Right-handed	Right-arm fast	
3	**Joel Paris**	Australia	11 December 1992 (age 33)	Left-handed	Left-arm fast	
2	**Jhye Richardson**	Australia	20 September 1996 (age 30)	Right-handed	Right-arm fast	

== Administration and support staff ==
Perth Scorchers staff
Position	Name
General Manager	Kade Harvey
Head Coach	Adam Voges
Assistant Coach	Tim Macdonald
Assistant Coach	Beau Casson

== Players ==
The Scorchers have focused on selecting mainly local players in their squad throughout their time in the BBL. This practice was questioned by some commentators, including Brad Hodge and Dirk Nannes, as being unfair or possibly illegal to "bundle" contracts by overpaying on state cricket association contracts and underpaying on the Scorcher's contract. However, no adverse findings have ever been delivered against the Scorchers or the WACA. In 2023 it was highlighted that the Melbourne Stars had five ex-Scorchers on their squad.

=== Australian representatives ===
The following is a list of cricketers who have played for the Scorchers after making their debut in the national men's team (the period they spent as both a Scorchers squad member and an Australian-capped player is in brackets):

- Michael Beer (BBL|01–03)
- Brad Hogg (BBL|01–05)
- Michael Hussey (BBL|01–02)
- Simon Katich (BBL|01–03)
- Mitch Marsh (BBL|01–16)
- Shaun Marsh (BBL|01–08)
- Marcus North (BBL|01–02)
- Luke Ronchi (BBL|01)
- Adam Voges (BBL|02–07)
- Ashton Agar (BBL|03–16)
- Nathan Coulter-Nile (BBL|03–08)
- Pat Cummins (BBL|03)
- James Muirhead (BBL|04–07)
- Joel Paris (BBL|05–10, 15–16)
- Cameron Bancroft (BBL|06–12)
- Mitchell Johnson (BBL|06–07)
- Andrew Tye (BBL|06–14)
- Jason Behrendorff (BBL|07–14)
- Hilton Cartwright (BBL|07–08)
- Michael Klinger (BBL|07–08)
- Jhye Richardson (BBL|07–16)
- Ashton Turner (BBL|07–16)
- Fawad Ahmed (BBL|09–10)
- Kurtis Patterson (BBL|09–11)
- Cameron Green (BBL|10, 12)
- Peter Hatzoglou (BBL|11-12)
- Josh Inglis (BBL|12–15)
- Aaron Hardie (BBL|13–16)
- Marcus Harris (BBL|13)
- Cooper Connolly (BBL|14–16)
- Lance Morris (BBL|14–16)
- Mahli Beardman (BBL|16)

=== Overseas players ===
- (England) Paul Collingwood (BBL|01)
- (South Africa) Herschelle Gibbs (BBL|01–02)
- (South Africa) Alfonso Thomas (BBL|02–03)
- (Pakistan) Yasir Arafat (BBL|03–04)
- (England) Michael Carberry (BBL|04–05)
- (England) David Willey (BBL|05–08)
- (England) Ian Bell (BBL|06)
- (England) Tim Bresnan (BBL|06–07)
- (Pakistan) Usman Qadir (BBL|08)
- (England) Chris Jordan (BBL|09)
- (England) Liam Livingstone (BBL|09–10)
- (South Africa) Morné Morkel (BBL|09)
- (New Zealand) Colin Munro (BBL|10–11)
- (England) Joe Clarke (BBL|10)
- (England) Jason Roy (BBL|10)
- (England) Laurie Evans (BBL|11, 13, 15)
- (England) Tymal Mills (BBL|11)
- (South Africa) Faf du Plessis (BBL|12)
- (England) Stephen Eskinazi (BBL|12–13)
- (England) Adam Lyth (BBL|12)
- (England) David Payne (BBL|12, 15)
- (England) Zak Crawley (BBL|13, 16)
- (New Zealand) Finn Allen (BBL|14–15)
- (England) Matthew Hurst (BBL|14)
- (England) Keaton Jennings (BBL|14)
- (England) Aneurin Donald (BBL|16)
- (England) Calvin Harrison (BBL|16)

== Honours ==
- Champions (6): BBL|03, BBL|04, BBL|06, BBL|11, BBL|12, BBL|15
- Runners-Up (3): BBL|01, BBL|02, BBL|10
- Minor Premiers (6): BBL|01, BBL|06, BBL|07, BBL|11, BBL|12, BBL|15
- Finals series appearances (12): BBL|01, BBL|02, BBL|03, BBL|04, BBL|05, BBL|06, BBL|07, BBL|10, BBL|11, BBL|12, BBL|13 , BBL|15
- Wooden Spoons (1): BBL|08

== Statistics and awards ==
As of 13 September 2026

=== Team stats ===
- Win–loss record:

Opposition	M	Won	Lost	Tied	NR	W–L%
Adelaide Strikers	29	17	12	0	0	58.62
Brisbane Heat	25	16	9	0	0	64
Hobart Hurricanes	23	14	9	0	0	60.87
Melbourne Renegades	24	17	6	0	1	73.91
Melbourne Stars	25	16	8	0	1	66.67
Sydney Sixers	32	20	12	0	0	62.5
Sydney Thunder	21	10	11	0	0	47.62
Total	179	110	67	0	2	62.15

- Highest score in an innings: 6/257 (20 overs) vs Brisbane Heat, 19 December 2025
- Highest successful chase: 2/192 (19.2 overs) vs Melbourne Renegades, 22 December 2011
- Lowest successful defence: 7/117 (20 overs) vs Melbourne Renegades, 26 December 2013
- Largest victory:
  - By runs: 98 runs vs Adelaide Strikers, 10 January 2013
  - By balls remaining: 53 balls remaining vs Adelaide Strikers, 20 January 2023
- Longest winning streak: 9 matches (18 January 2023 – 3 January 2024)
- Longest losing streak: 5 matches (24 January – 28 December 2020)

=== Individual stats ===
- Most runs: Ashton Turner – 2,520
- Highest score in an innings: Colin Munro – 114* (73) vs Adelaide Strikers, 11 December 2021
- Highest partnership: Michael Klinger and Shaun Marsh – 171* vs Melbourne Renegades, 30 December 2015
- Most wickets: Andrew Tye – 159
- Best bowling figures in an innings: Andrew Tye – 5/23 (4 overs) vs Melbourne Stars, 26 December 2017
- Hat-tricks taken:
  - Andrew Tye vs Brisbane Heat, 11 January 2017
  - Andrew Tye vs Sydney Sixers, 23 December 2017
- Most catches (fielder): Ashton Agar – 55
- Most dismissals (wicket-keeper): Josh Inglis – 90 (73 catches, 17 stumpings)

=== Individual awards ===
- Player of the Match:
  - Mitch Marsh – 11
  - Jhye Richardson and Ashton Turner – 9
  - Jason Behrendorff, Josh Inglis, and Shaun Marsh – 6
  - Michael Klinger – 5
  - Cameron Bancroft and Andrew Tye – 4
  - Ashton Agar, Nathan Coulter-Nile, Laurie Evans, Brad Hogg, and Liam Livingstone – 3
  - Finn Allen, Yasir Arafat, Michael Carberry, Cooper Connolly, Aaron Hardie, Nick Hobson, Mitchell Johnson, Colin Munro, David Payne, Jason Roy, Craig Simmons, and David Willey – 2
  - Fawad Ahmed, Michael Beer, Hilton Cartwright, Herschelle Gibbs, Peter Hatzoglou, Simon Katich, Matthew Kelly, Hamish McKenzie, Marcus North, Joel Paris, Kurtis Patterson, and Adam Voges – 1
- BBL Player of the Final:
  - Brad Hogg – BBL|03
  - Shaun Marsh – BBL|04
  - Jhye Richardson – BBL|06
  - Laurie Evans – BBL|11
  - Ashton Turner – BBL|12
  - David Payne – BBL|15
- BBL Player of the Tournament:
  - Cooper Connolly – BBL|14
- BBL Team of the Tournament:
  - Mitch Marsh (3) – BBL|06, BBL|09, BBL|11
  - Josh Inglis (3) – BBL|09, BBL|12, BBL|13
  - Aaron Hardie (3) – BBL|12, BBL|13, BBL|15
  - Andrew Tye (2) – BBL|05, BBL|12
  - Ashton Turner (2) – BBL|07, BBL|08
  - Ashton Agar – BBL|07
  - Mitchell Johnson – BBL|07
  - Colin Munro – BBL|10
  - Jhye Richardson – BBL|10
  - Lance Morris – BBL|13
  - Jason Behrendorff – BBL|14
  - Cooper Connolly – BBL|14
  - Finn Allen – BBL|15
