= Nick Hobson =

Australian cricketer (born 1994)

Personal information
- Full name: Nicholas Richard Hobson
- Born: 22 August 1994 (age 32); Perth, Western Australia
- Batting: Left-handed
- Bowling: Right-arm medium
- Role: Middle-order batter

Domestic team information
- Years: Team
- 2018/19–: Perth Scorchers (squad no. 19)
- 2020/21–2023/24: Western Australia (squad no. 19)
- T20 debut: 24 January 2019 Perth Scorchers v Sydney Thunder
- LA debut: 2 March 2021 Western Australia v South Australia

Career statistics
Competition	List A	T20
Matches	10	39
Runs scored	240	481
Batting average	48.00	25.31
100s/50s	0/1	0/0
Top score	64*	48*
Catches/stumpings	7/–	22/–
- Source: Cricinfo, 9 July 2025

Nicholas Richard Hobson (born 22 August 1994) is an Australian cricketer who represents the Perth Scorchers in the Big Bash League. He made his Twenty20 debut for the Perth Scorchers against the Sydney Thunder on 24 January 2019 during the 2018-19 Big Bash League season. He made his List A debut on 2 March 2021, for Western Australia in the 2020–21 Marsh One-Day Cup.
