= Laurie Evans =

English cricketer (born 1987)

Personal information
- Full name: Laurie John Evans
- Born: 12 October 1987 (age 39); Lambeth, London, England
- Height: 6 ft 0 in (1.83 m)
- Batting: Right-handed
- Bowling: Right-arm medium-fast
- Role: Batter, occasional wicket-keeper

Domestic team information
- Years: Team
- 2005–2010: Surrey (Note: Only sides which Evans has played for in more than one season are included in this list. For other sides, see the detail in the main article.)
- 2010–2016: Warwickshire (squad no. 32)
- 2017–2020: Sussex (squad no. 32)
- 2020–2026: Surrey
- 2021/22–2023/24: Perth Scorchers
- 2022–2023: Manchester Originals
- 2024–2025: Southern Brave
- 2025/26–present: Perth Scorchers
- FC debut: 14 April 2007 Durham UCCE v Nottinghamshire
- LA debut: 5 August 2009 Surrey v Derbyshire

Career statistics
Competition	FC	LA	T20
Matches	73	63	382
Runs scored	3,495	1,735	7,765
Batting average	29.36	37.71	28.23
100s/50s	6/18	3/5	3/44
Top score	213*	134*	108*
Balls bowled	366	54	22
Wickets	2	1	1
Bowling average	135.00	82.00	35.00
5 wickets in innings	0	0	0
10 wickets in match	0	0	0
Best bowling	1/29	1/29	1/5
Catches/stumpings	58/–	25/–	163/6
- Source: CricketArchive, 27 September 2026
- Evans's voice recorded April 2015

Laurie John Evans (born 12 October 1987) is an English cricketer who currently plays for Essex County Cricket Club.

A right-handed top-order batsman Evans has previously represented Surrey, Warwickshire, Northamptonshire and Sussex in county cricket. Since 2019 he has been selected as an overseas player for various global Twenty20 leagues. He has played for the Rajshahi Kings, Multan Sultans, St Kitts & Nevis Patriots, Barbados Royals, Colombo Kings, Perth Scorchers and Melbourne Renegades.

He is the nephew of Olympic rower Greg Searle.

== Career ==
Evans was born in Lambeth in London and educated at The John Fisher School and Whitgift School. He attended Durham University, where he played first-class cricket for Durham MCC University. He played three first-class games for Durham UCCE in 2007, and one first-class game for the Marylebone Cricket Club (MCC) against the touring West Indies later that summer.

Evans graduated from Surrey County Cricket Club Academy in 2007. He made his first-class debut for the club in April 2009 in a County Championship Division Two match against Gloucestershire at The Oval. He was selected for the following match at Derbyshire, and made two further appearances later in the campaign, his Twenty20 debut in June and List A debut in August.

Having only played two Championship games and a single one-day match in the 2010 season, Evans was released by Surrey at the end of the campaign. He signed for Warwickshire later that year.

With Tim Ambrose, Evans set a new Warwickshire county record for a sixth wicket partnership on 1 July 2015. The pair added 327 against Sussex in the County Championship at Birmingham.

In August 2016 Evans moved to Northamptonshire on a one-month-long loan. In December 2016, Evans signed for Sussex.

In September 2018, Evans was named in Kabul's squad in the first edition of the Afghanistan Premier League tournament. The following month, he was named in the squad for the Rajshahi Kings team, following the draft for the 2018–19 Bangladesh Premier League. He was the leading run-scorer for the Kings in the tournament, with 339 runs in eleven matches. In November 2019, he was selected to play for the Dhaka Platoon in the 2019–20 Bangladesh Premier League.

On 29 May 2020, Evans was named in a 55-man group of players to begin training ahead of international fixtures starting in England following the COVID-19 pandemic. On 9 July 2020, Evans was included in England's 24-man squad to start training behind closed doors for the One Day International (ODI) series against Ireland.

On 7 August 2020, Evans re-joined Surrey on a week-long loan to play in the 2020 Bob Willis Trophy match against Essex. The loan was extended for the following match and the next week Surrey announced that Evans had signed a two-year contract with the club. Sussex initially stated that he would return to their side for the 2020 T20 Blast before taking up his contract with Surrey at the end of the season. However, Sussex subsequently announced that Evans had expressed his desire to join Surrey immediately, with both clubs issuing statements that said Evans would be joining his new club on loan for the remainder of the season - but would not be able to play in any matches against his former side - before moving permanently at the end of the campaign.

In November 2021 Evans was signed by the Perth Scorchers for the 2021-22 Big Bash league. He played a very crucial role in the Scorchers winning that season including scoring 76 runs off 41 balls in the final.

In April 2022, he was bought by the Manchester Originals for the 2022 season of The Hundred.

Following a complex and protracted process, in June 2026 Evans was issued with a two-year suspension by the Court of Arbitration for Sport (CAS) backdated to May 2024 for an anti-doping rule violation relating to unintentional use of ostarine relating to a test made in August 2022. He had served a period of provisional suspension from November 2022 to March 2023, and in May 2024 had been found to have borne "no fault and negligence" by the National Anti-Doping Panel (NADP) for the positive test. That decision was in turn appealed by UK Anti-Doping leading to a reprimand issued in March 2025. However, the World Anti-Doping Agency appealed that decision to CAS who ultimately issued their final decision in 2026. Richard Gould, the CEO of England and Wales Cricket Board, said that the governing body viewed that the case as relating to contamination and that the decision was due to a "heavy-handed and flawed system".

Evans had had his contract with the Perth Scorchers terminated in November 2022 due to the provisional suspension. He was subsequently re-drafted by the Manchester Originals in the £100k bracket for the 2023 season. Evans was also re-selected by Perth Scorchers for the 2023-24 Big Bash league".

In October 2026, Evans joined Essex on a one-year white-ball contract with an option to also play in the county championship.
