= Cooper Connolly =

Australian cricketer (born 2003)

- Connolly in 2026

Personal information
- Full name: Cooper Patrick Leonard Connolly
- Born: 22 August 2003 (age 23); Perth, Western Australia, Australia
- Batting: Left-handed
- Bowling: Slow left-arm orthodox
- Role: Batting All-rounder

International information
- National side: Australia (2024–present)
- Test debut (cap 471): 10 February 2025 v Sri Lanka
- Last Test: 27 October 2026 v South Africa
- ODI debut (cap 249): 29 September 2024 v England
- Last ODI: 30 September 2026 v South Africa
- ODI shirt no.: 9
- T20I debut (cap 111): 7 September 2024 v Scotland
- Last T20I: 21 June 2026 v Bangladesh
- T20I shirt no.: 9

Domestic team information
- Years: Team
- 2022/23–present: Perth Scorchers
- 2023/24–present: Western Australia
- 2025: San Francisco Unicorns
- 2026: Punjab Kings

Career statistics
Competition	Test	ODI	T20I	FC
Matches	2	18	14	14
Runs scored	33	502	91	829
Batting average	11.00	38.61	10.11	39.47
100s/50s	0/0	1/3	0/0	0/9
Top score	29	149	47	90
Balls bowled	108	283	150	561
Wickets	1	9	3	6
Bowling average	76.00	27.66	77.00	66.33
5 wickets in innings	0	1	0	0
10 wickets in match	0	0	0	0
Best bowling	1/41	5/22	1/24	2/59
Catches/stumpings	0/–	6/–	4/–	6/–
- Source: ESPNcricinfo, 1 November 2026

Cooper Patrick Leonard Connolly (born 22 August 2003) is an Australian international cricketer who represents the Australian national cricket team in all forms of this game. He is a left-handed batter and a slow left-arm orthodox bowler, who plays for Western Australia in domestic cricket, Perth Scorchers in the Big Bash League and Punjab Kings in the Indian Premier League.

== Career ==
Connolly playing against South Africa in 2026

In January 2022, he was named as the captain of the Australia national under-19 cricket team for the 2022 ICC Under-19 Cricket World Cup. The allrounder also captained the Western Australia under-17 cricket team. In August 2022, he was signed by the Perth Scorchers to play for them in the 2022–23 Big Bash League season. He made his Twenty20 debut for the Scorchers, on 7 January 2023 against the Brisbane Heat in the 2022–23 Big Bash League. He played in the final and got 25 runs off 11 balls to win the match for the Scorchers.

He made his List A debut for Western Australia on 24 September 2023, against Queensland in the 2023–24 Marsh One-Day Cup. He made his first-class debut for Western Australia on 21 March 2024, against Tasmania in the 2023–24 Sheffield Shield final, scoring 90 in the first innings.

On 15 July 2024, Connolly was named in Australia's T20I and ODI squads for their tour of England and Scotland to be held in September that year. He made his T20I debut against Scotland on September 7 and his ODI debut against England on September 29.

In January 2025 Connolly was included in Australia's Test squad to tour Sri Lanka. In the second Test in Australia's tour of Sri Lanka in January 2025, Connolly made his Test debut. Before the game, he received his Baggy Green, the 471st (Note: Referring to number of players to have played Test Cricket for Australia) from former Test allrounder and fellow Western Australian Simon Katich.

In June 2026, Connolly scored his first hundred in international cricket in an ODI against Bangladesh at the Sher-e-Bangla National Cricket Stadium in Mirpur, scoring 149 off 134 balls, amounting to more than half of the team's successful run chase of 275.

== Playing style ==
Connolly has stated that he models himself after former Australian batsman and fellow Western Australian Shaun Marsh.

== Records and achievements ==
During the 2025 ODI series against South Africa, Connolly became the youngest Australian to take a five-wicket haul in One Day International cricket.

=== International five-wicket hauls ===
==== ODI five-wicket hauls ====
Wkts	Runs	Overs	Econ	Match	Opponents	City	Venue	Year
5	22	6	3.66	5	South Africa	Mackay, Australia	Great Barrier Reef Arena	2025

=== International centuries ===
==== ODI centuries ====
Runs	Balls	Opponents	City	Venue	Year
149	134	Bangladesh	Mirpur, Bangladesh	Shere Bangla National Stadium	2026
