= Joel Paris =

Australian cricketer (born 1992)

Personal information
- Full name: Joel Samuel Paris
- Born: 11 December 1992 (age 33); Perth, Western Australia, Australia
- Height: 191 cm (6 ft 3 in)
- Batting: Left-handed
- Bowling: Left-arm fast-medium
- Role: Bowler

International information
- National side: Australia (2016)
- ODI debut (cap 211): 12 January 2016 v India
- Last ODI: 15 January 2016 v India
- ODI shirt no.: 11

Domestic team information
- Years: Team
- 2012/13–present: Western Australia (squad no. 3)
- 2013/14–2020/21: Perth Scorchers (squad no. 3)
- 2021/22–2022/23: Hobart Hurricanes (squad no. 3)
- 2023/24–2024/25: Melbourne Stars (squad no. 8)
- 2024/25–present: Perth Scorchers (squad no. 3)

Career statistics
Competition	ODI	FC	LA	T20
Matches	2	56	31	59
Runs scored	–	1,417	111	109
Batting average	–	22.14	18.50	7.26
100s/50s	–	1/1	0/0	0/0
Top score	–	102*	18*	20*
Balls bowled	96	10,177	1,499	1,131
Wickets	1	211	61	58
Bowling average	93.00	20.19	18.16	27.82
5 wickets in innings	0	8	1	0
10 wickets in match	–	1	0	0
Best bowling	1/40	6/23	5/42	3/13
Catches/stumpings	1/–	25/–	11/–	16/–
- Source: ESPNcricinfo, 23 October 2026

Joel Samuel Paris (born 11 December 1992) is an Australian cricketer, currently contracted to Western Australia and the Perth Scorchers domestically.

== Career ==
From Perth, Paris represented Western Australia at under-19 level, making his debut while aged only 16. He attended Scotch College in Perth. A left-arm fast bowler, he went on to play a total of eight Youth One Day International (ODI) matches for the Australian national under-19 cricket team, including at the 2012 ICC Under-19 World Cup, where he took six wickets.

For the 2011–12 season, Paris received a rookie contract with the Western Australian Cricket Association (WACA), which was maintained for the following season. Having missed portions of the previous season due to a stress fracture in his foot, he debuted at state level towards the end of the 2012–13 edition of the Ryobi One-Day Cup, taking 1/35 against New South Wales. Signed to the Perth Scorchers for the 2013–14 season, he debuted for the team at the 2013 edition of the Champions League Twenty20, taking two wickets from four matches (one of which was abandoned due to rain). These wickets each came in the match against the Otago Volts, which was his Twenty20 debut. He took wickets with his first two balls, with his first over a double-wicket maiden, but conceded 50 runs from his final three overs to finish with 2/50 for the match. At grade cricket level, Paris plays for Claremont–Nedlands.

He made his One Day International debut for Australia against India on 12 January 2016. He wears the no. 11 jersey, a number previously worn by Glenn McGrath.

== Career best performances ==
	Bowling (innings)			
	Figures	Fixture	Venue	Season
ODI	1/40	Australia v India	Gabba, Brisbane	2015/16
FC	6/23	Western Australia v Tasmania	WACA, Perth	2015/16
LA	4/13	Tasmania v Western Australia	Gabba, Brisbane	2014/15
T20	3/22	Perth Scorchers v Lahore Lions	M. Chinnaswamy Stadium, Bangalore	2014
