= Aaron Hardie =

Australian cricketer (born 1999)

Personal information
- Full name: Aaron Mark Hardie
- Born: 7 January 1999 (age 27); Bournemouth, Dorset, England
- Height: 193 cm (6 ft 4 in)
- Batting: Right-handed
- Bowling: Right-arm medium-fast
- Role: All-rounder

International information
- National side: Australia (2023–2025)
- ODI debut (cap 239): 9 September 2023 v South Africa
- Last ODI: 22 August 2025 v South Africa
- ODI shirt no.: 20
- T20I debut (cap 104): 30 August 2023 v South Africa
- Last T20I: 21 June 2026 v Bangladesh
- T20I shirt no.: 20

Domestic team information
- Years: Team
- 2018/19: Cricket Australia XI
- 2018/19–present: Perth Scorchers (squad no. 21)
- 2018/19–present: Western Australia
- 2022: Surrey (squad no. 15)
- 2024: Texas Super Kings
- 2025: Punjab Kings
- 2026: Peshawar Zalmi

Career statistics
Competition	ODI	T20I	FC	LA
Matches	15	18	44	35
Runs scored	180	180	2,320	492
Batting average	15.00	22.50	38.66	20.50
100s/50s	0/0	0/0	3/12	0/2
Top score	44	28*	174*	64
Balls bowled	426	270	4,485	1014
Wickets	10	15	74	28
Bowling average	39.20	26.00	30.90	34.28
5 wickets in innings	0	0	0	0
10 wickets in match	0	0	0	0
Best bowling	2/13	3/21	4/24	3/28
Catches/stumpings	6/–	8/–	29/–	13/–
- Source: ESPNcricinfo, 23 October 2026

Aaron Mark Hardie (born 7 January 1999) is an Australian international cricketer who has represented the Australia national cricket team in ODI and T20I cricket. A right-handed all-rounder who bowls right-arm medium-fast, domestically he plays for Western Australia at the state level, and the Perth Scorchers in the Big Bash League.

== Early life ==
Hardie was born in England, but grew up in Perth, Western Australia.

== Domestic career ==
In January 2018, he was added to Australia's squad for the 2018 Under-19 Cricket World Cup, but was later ruled out of the tournament due to injury. In November 2018, he played for the Cricket Australia XI team in a four-day match against India at the Sydney Cricket Ground. During the match, he took the wicket of India's captain Virat Kohli, finishing with figures of four wickets for 50 runs in the first innings, and scored 86 runs while batting. Hardie described the experience as being "a bit surreal".

He made his Twenty20 debut for the Perth Scorchers in the 2018–19 Big Bash League season on 9 January 2019. He bowled one over, conceding thirteen runs, and did not bat, with the Perth Scorchers winning by six wickets. He made his first-class debut for Western Australia in the 2018–19 Sheffield Shield season on 20 March 2019. He made his List A debut on 23 October 2019, for Western Australia in the 2019–20 Marsh One-Day Cup. In March 2020, in round nine of the 2019–20 Sheffield Shield season, Hardie scored his maiden century in first-class cricket. In April 2022, in the final of the 2021–22 Sheffield Shield season, Hardie scored 174 not out, with Western Australia going on to win the tournament.

In June 2022, Hardie was signed by Surrey to play in the T20 Blast and County Championship in England.

Hardie was appointed Western Australia's captain for the 2026-27 Sheffield Shield season.

== International career ==
In August 2023 Hardie was called up to the Australia squad for the T20I series against South Africa. He was also called up to the squad for the ODI series against South Africa. On 30 August 2023 Hardie made his T20I debut for Australia against South Africa in the first match of the three match T20I series. On 9 September 2023 Hardie made his ODI debut for Australia against South Africa in the second match of the five match series.

== Statistics ==
T20 Franchise Statistics
Team	Season	League		Batting						Bowling						Fielding
Team	Season	Competition	Matches	Innings	Not Outs	Runs	Average	High score	100s / 50s	Overs	Wickets	Runs	Economy	Average	BBM	Catches
Perth Scorchers	2018/19	BBL	2	1	0	8	8.00	8	0 / 0	4	2	38	9.50	19.00	2/25	0
Perth Scorchers	2019/20	BBL	0	–	–	–	–	–	0 / 0	0	–	–	–	–	–	0
Perth Scorchers	2020/21	BBL	17	9	2	123	17.57	33	0 / 0	44	10	397	9.02	39.70	3/46	10
Perth Scorchers	2021/22	BBL	9	8	2	115	19.16	45	0 / 0	6	3	40	6.66	13.33	3/31	4
Perth Scorchers	2022/23	BBL	15	15	4	460	41.81	90*	0 / 4	14	5	112	8.00	22.40	2/10	6
Perth Scorchers	2023/24	BBL	11	11	2	334	37.11	85*	0 / 2	16.1	6	112	6.92	18.66	2/24	4
Perth Scorchers	2024/25	BBL	7	7	0	120	17.14	34	0 / 0	2	0	14	7.00	–	–	2
Perth Scorchers	2025/26	BBL	2	2	0	36	18.00	23	0 / 0	5.5	1	62	10.63	62.00	1/16	0
Perth Scorchers	Total		63	53	10	1196	27.81	90*	0 / 6	92	27	775	8.42	28.70	3/31	26
Surrey	2022	T20 Blast	3	3	0	29	9.66	15	0 / 0	5	1	62	12.40	62.00	1/33	1
Surrey	Total		3	3	0	29	9.66	15	0 / 0	5	1	62	12.40	62.00	1/33	1
Texas Super Kings	2024	MLC	7	7	1	147	24.50	40*	0 / 0	8.3	4	100	11.76	25.00	2/22	8
Texas Super Kings	Total		7	7	1	147	24.50	40*	0 / 0	8.3	4	100	11.76	25.00	2/22	8
Career Total			73	63	11	1372	26.38	90*	0 / 6	105.3	32	937	8.90	29.28	3/31	35

As of match played 19 December 2025
