= Lance Morris =

Australian cricketer (born 1998)

Personal information
- Full name: Lance Richard Thomas Morris
- Born: 28 March 1998 (age 28); Busselton, Western Australia, Australia
- Nickname: The Wild Thing
- Batting: Right-handed
- Bowling: Right-arm fast
- Role: Bowler

International information
- National side: Australia (2024–present)
- ODI debut (cap 245): 2 February 2024 v West Indies
- Last ODI: 10 November 2024 v Pakistan
- ODI shirt no.: 28

Domestic team information
- Years: Team
- 2019/20–2020/21: Melbourne Stars (squad no. 28)
- 2020/21–present: Western Australia (squad no. 1)
- 2021–present: Perth Scorchers (squad no. 1)

Career statistics
| Competition | ODI | FC | LA | T20 |
|---|---|---|---|---|
| Matches | 3 | 26 | 14 | 35 |
| Runs scored | 0 | 45 | 15 | 3 |
| Batting average | 0 | 3.75 | 3.75 | 1.00 |
| 100s/50s | 0/0 | 0/0 | 0/0 | 0/0 |
| Top score | 0 | 14* | 12 | 2 |
| Balls bowled | 123 | 3,774 | 593 | 665 |
| Wickets | 4 | 87 | 22 | 40 |
| Bowling average | 24.00 | 24.75 | 24.04 | 22.95 |
| 5 wickets in innings | 0 | 3 | 0 | 1 |
| 10 wickets in match | 0 | 0 | 0 | 0 |
| Best bowling | 2/13 | 5/26 | 4/64 | 5/24 |
| Catches/stumpings | 1/– | 7/– | 5/– | 7/– |
- Source: Cricinfo, 10 January 2026

Lance Richard Thomas Morris (born 28 March 1998) is an Australian cricketer who represents the Australia national cricket team in ODI cricket. A right-arm fast bowler, Morris plays for Western Australia and the Perth Scorchers. He is regarded as one of the fastest bowlers in Australia.

Morris previously played for the Melbourne Stars.

== Background ==
He was born in Busselton, Western Australia to Garry Morris and Peta Morris. Morris' hometown is Dunsborough, Western Australia and moved to Perth in 2016 to pursue cricket.

== Franchise career ==
Lance made his Twenty20 debut on 10 January 2020 for the Melbourne Stars in the 2019–20 Big Bash League season. He remained with the Melbourne Stars for the 2020–21 season, before signing with the Perth Scorchers for 2021–22. Lance was a part of the Scorchers back-to-back championship wins for the 2021–22 season and the 2022–23 season.

Morris has committed to Perth Scorchers until at least the end of the 2024–25 KFC Big Bash League season, after signing a two-year deal with the Club.

== Domestic career ==
Morris made his first-class debut on 10 October 2020, for Western Australia in the 2020–21 Sheffield Shield season. He made his List A debut on 8 April 2021, for Western Australia in the 2020–21 Marsh One-Day Cup.

Lance played for Western Australia in the 2021-22 Sheffield Shield season. He played in the grand final against Victoria, which saw Western Australia overcome a 23-year drought and be named Sheffield Shield Champions for 2021–22.

In the 2022–23 season, Morris played for Western Australia in their back-to-back Sheffield Shield series triumph.

== International career ==
Morris was added to the Australian Test squad against the West Indies in December 2022.

Morris toured as a part of the winning Australian Test squad against South Africa in December 2022–January 2023. He was also in the Australian Test squad for the tour against India in February–March 2023. Additionally, Morris was included in Australia’s extended Test squad to face Pakistan in 2023/24. However he was released from the squad after the first test to participate in the Big Bash League.

In January 2024, he earned his maiden call-up to the Australia's One Day International (ODI) squad for their series against the West Indies, making his debut in the first match of the series on 2 February 2024. In the 3rd match of the series at Manuka Oval on February 6, 2024, Morris took his first wicket in international cricket. He recorded figures of 2/13 off 4.3 overs in a comprehensive victory over the West Indies.

== Statistics ==
T20 Franchise Statistics
| Team | Season | League | | Batting | | | | | Bowling | | | | | Fielding |
| Team | Season | Competition | Matches | Innings | Runs | Average | High score | 100s / 50s | Overs | Wickets | Runs | Economy | Average | Catches |
|---|---|---|---|---|---|---|---|---|---|---|---|---|---|---|
| Melbourne Stars | 2019/20 | BBL | 4 | 0 | 0 | — | — | 0 / 0 | 10 | 1 | 119 | 11.90 | 119.00 | 1 |
| Melbourne Stars | 2020/21 | BBL | 1 | 1 | 2 | 2.00 | 2 | 0 / 0 | 2 | 0 | 23 | 11.50 | — | 0 |
| Melbourne Stars | Total | | 5 | 1 | 2 | 2.00 | 2 | 0 / 0 | 12 | 1 | 142 | 11.83 | 142.00 | 1 |
| Perth Scorchers | 2021/22 | BBL | 4 | 1 | 0 | 0.00 | 0* | 0 / 0 | 15.3 | 2 | 125 | 8.17 | 62.5 | 0 |
| Perth Scorchers | 2022/23 | BBL | 5 | 0 | 0 | — | — | 0 / 0 | 20 | 9 | 137 | 6.85 | 15.22 | 0 |
| Perth Scorchers | 2023/24 | BBL | 7 | 1 | 1 | 1.00 | 1 | 0 / 0 | 23 | 13 | 166 | 7.21 | 12.77 | 1 |
| Perth Scorchers | Total | | 16 | 2 | 1 | 0.50 | 1 | 0 / 0 | 48.3 | 24 | 428 | 8.86 | 17.83 | 1 |
| Career Total | | | 21 | 3 | 3 | 1.00 | 2 | 0 / 0 | 60.3 | 25 | 570 | 9.66 | 24.73 | 2 |

Statistics are correct to January 14, 2024
