= Jhye Richardson =

Australian cricketer (born 1996)

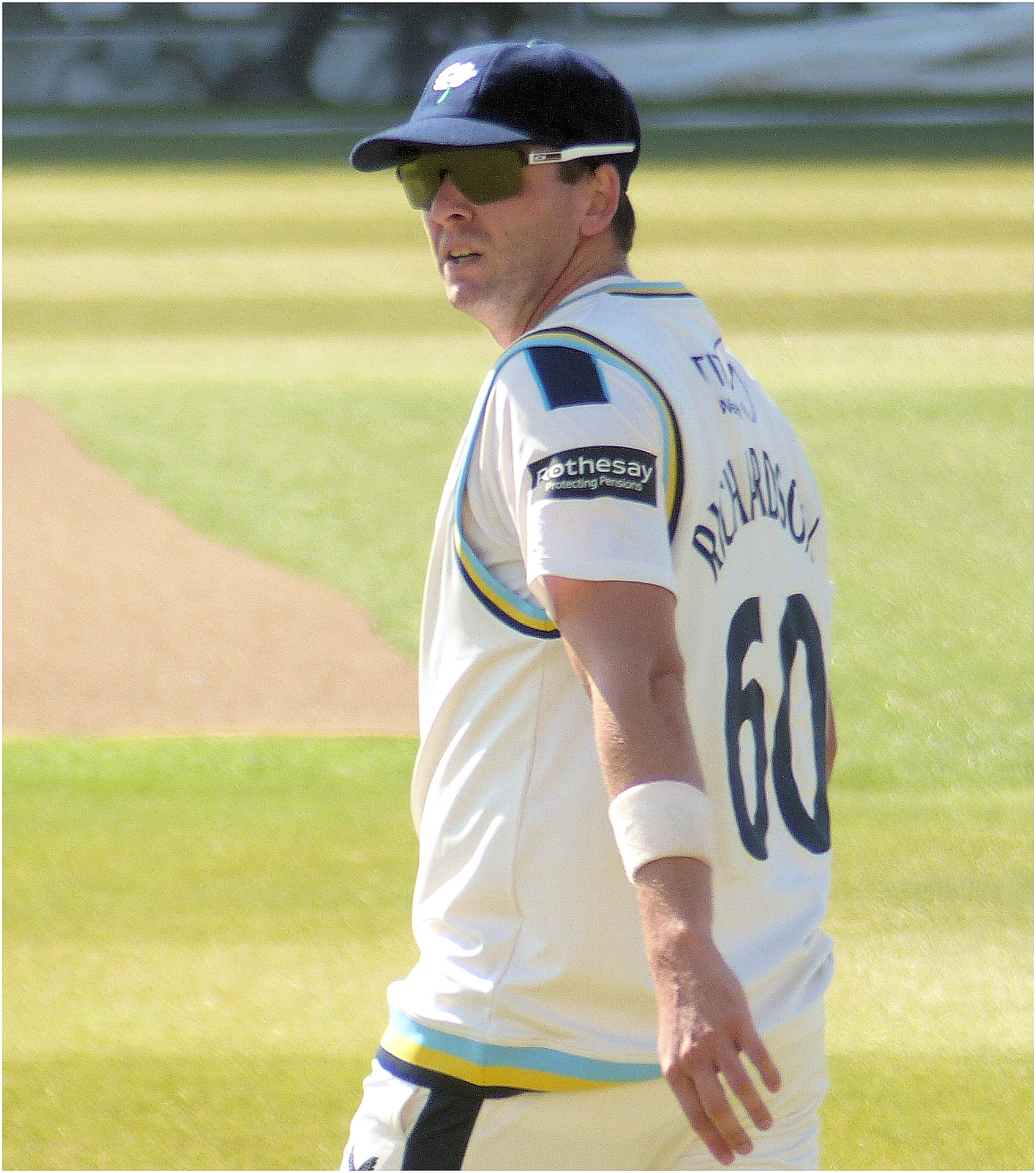
- Richardson playing for Yorkshire in April 2025

Personal information
- Full name: Jhye Avon Richardson
- Born: 20 September 1996 (age 30); Murdoch, Western Australia
- Height: 179 cm (5 ft 10 in)
- Batting: Right-handed
- Bowling: Right-arm fast
- Role: Bowler

International information
- National side: Australia (2017–present)
- Test debut (cap 458): 24 January 2019 v Sri Lanka
- Last Test: 26 December 2025 v England
- ODI debut (cap 224): 19 January 2018 v England
- Last ODI: 19 June 2022 v Sri Lanka
- ODI shirt no.: 60
- T20I debut (cap 87): 19 February 2017 v Sri Lanka
- Last T20I: 11 June 2022 v Sri Lanka
- T20I shirt no.: 60

Domestic team information
- Years: Team
- 2015/16–: Western Australia
- 2015/16–: Perth Scorchers
- 2021: Punjab Kings
- 2024: Delhi Capitals
- 2026: Yorkshire

Career statistics
Competition	Test	ODI	T20I	FC
Matches	4	15	18	38
Runs scored	25	93	45	923
Batting average	6.25	18.60	15.00	19.22
100s/50s	0/0	0/0	0/0	0/5
Top score	9	29	11	71
Balls bowled	591	810	396	7,111
Wickets	13	27	19	143
Bowling average	21.00	29.37	29.26	23.75
5 wickets in innings	1	0	0	5
10 wickets in match	0	0	0	1
Best bowling	5/42	4/26	3/26	8/47
Catches/stumpings	0/–	5/–	10/–	13/–
- Source: ESPNcricinfo, 23 October 2026

Jhye Avon Richardson (born 20 September 1996) is an Australian cricketer who has represented the Australia national cricket team in all three formats. A right-arm fast bowler, Richardson plays for Western Australia and Perth Scorchers at domestic level.

== Domestic and franchise career ==
Richardson is a right-arm fast bowler, and says that, due to his height (178 cm) and frame ("70 odd kilos"), he was initially discouraged by coaches to become a pace bowler, a role generally associated with taller and heavier cricketers. He made his List A debut for Western Australia on 21 October 2015 in the 2015–16 Matador BBQs One-Day Cup. In December 2015, he was named in Australia's squad for the 2016 Under-19 Cricket World Cup. On 16 January 2016, he made his T20 debut for the Perth Scorchers in the 2015–16 Big Bash League. He made his first-class debut for Western Australia on 15 March 2016 in the 2015–16 Sheffield Shield.

In the 2016–17 Big Bash League, Richardson claimed 11 wickets for the Scorchers and was named player of the match in the final after taking 3/30 as the Scorchers defeated the Sydney Sixers.

In November 2018, Richardson took a career best 8/47 in the first innings against New South Wales at Optus Stadium.

In February 2021, Richardson was bought by the Punjab Kings in the IPL auction ahead of the 2021 Indian Premier League, and also the Welsh Fire for the inaugural 2021 season of The Hundred tournament.

He was bought by Mumbai Indians in the IPL 2023 auction. In March 2023, Richardson underwent surgery to address hamstring issues, and, as a result, missed the entire of the 2023 IPL season.

He was bought by Delhi Capitals in the 2024 IPL auction.

In February 2026, Richardson signed a short-term contract with Yorkshire County Cricket Club to play in the opening two months of that year's County Championship season.

== International career ==
In February 2017, Richardson was named in Australia's T20I squad for their series against Sri Lanka. He made his T20I debut for Australia against Sri Lanka at Kardinia Park, Geelong on 19 February 2017.

In January 2018, he was named in Australia's ODI squad for their series against England. He made his ODI debut for Australia against England on 19 January 2018. Later in the same month, he was named in Australia's Test squad for their series against South Africa in March 2018, albeit, was not selected to play. In April 2018, he was awarded a national contract by Cricket Australia for the 2018–19 season.

In January 2019, Richardson was named in the squad for the ODI series against India. He played the first game at the Sydney Cricket Ground, returning with career best figures of 4/26, including the wicket of the Indian captain Virat Kohli, to help Australia to its 1,000th international win across all formats. Later the same month, Richardson was added to Australia's Test squad for the series against Sri Lanka, replacing the injured Josh Hazlewood. He made his Test debut for Australia against Sri Lanka on 24 January 2019, taking three wickets in the first innings.

He was awarded the Bradman Young Cricketer of the Year at the Allan Border Medal ceremony by Cricket Australia in 2018.

Richardson played in the final three matches of Australia's ODI series against India in March 2019, claiming 8 wickets as Australia came back from an 0–2 series deficit to eventually win the series 3–2.

In the subsequent series against Pakistan in the UAE in March 2019, Richardson dislocated his shoulder in the second match diving in the outfield. Despite this, in April 2019, he was named in Australia's squad for the 2019 Cricket World Cup. The International Cricket Council named him as one of the five exciting talents making their Cricket World Cup debut. However, he was later ruled out of the tournament, and was replaced in the squad by Kane Richardson.

In December 2021, in the second Ashes Test match against England, Richardson took his first five-wicket haul in Test cricket.
