= 2025–26 Big Bash League season =

15th edition of the Big Bash League

2025–26 Big Bash League
- Dates: 14 December 2025 – 25 January 2026
- Administrator: Cricket Australia
- Cricket format: Twenty20
- Tournament format(s): Group stage and playoffs
- Champions: Perth Scorchers (6th title)
- Runners-up: Sydney Sixers
- Participants: 8
- Matches: 44
- Attendance: 1,088,924 (24,748 per match)
- Player of the series: Sam Harper (Melbourne Stars)
- Most runs: Finn Allen (466) (Perth Scorchers)
- Most wickets: Haris Rauf (20) (Melbourne Stars)
- Official website: Big Bash League

The 2025–26 Big Bash League season or BBL|15 was the fifteenth edition of professional men's Twenty20 cricket tournament in Australia and the fifteenth under the Big Bash League (BBL) model. The tournament was played from 14 December 2025, with the final held on 25 January 2026, where the Perth Scorchers defeated the Sydney Sixers by 6 wickets to win their sixth title. The Hobart Hurricanes were the defending champions, but were knocked out by the Sydney Sixers during the Challenger.

== Background ==
Sky Sports UK extended its partnership with the Big Bash League for a further four years till 2029. Fox Cricket and Seven Network retained the official broadcasting rights for the 2025–26 BBL – Big Bash League.

== Draft ==
The 2025–26 season players draft was held on 19 June 2025.

Table of international draft selections
Club	Round	Pick	Player	National team	Notes
Adelaide Strikers	1	3	Luke Wood	England	
Adelaide Strikers	2	10	Jamie Overton	England	Pre-signed player
Adelaide Strikers	3	23	Hasan Ali	Pakistan	
Adelaide Strikers	4	26	Passed		
Brisbane Heat	1	1	Shaheen Afridi	Pakistan	
Brisbane Heat	2	9	Colin Munro	New Zealand	Pre-signed player
Brisbane Heat	3	24	Passed		
Brisbane Heat	4	25	Tom Alsop	England	
Hobart Hurricanes	1	6	Chris Jordan	England	Pre-signed player
Hobart Hurricanes	2	13	Rishad Hossain	Bangladesh	
Hobart Hurricanes	3	20	Passed		
Hobart Hurricanes	4	29	Rehan Ahmed	England	
Melbourne Renegades	1	4	Mohammad Rizwan	Pakistan	
Melbourne Renegades	2	11	Hassan Khan	United States	
Melbourne Renegades	3	22	Tim Seifert	New Zealand	Pre-signed player
Melbourne Renegades	4	27	Passed		
Melbourne Stars	1	2	Haris Rauf	Pakistan	Retention pick
Melbourne Stars	2	15	Tom Curran	England	Pre-signed player
Melbourne Stars	3	18	Joe Clarke	England	
Melbourne Stars	4	31	Passed		
Perth Scorchers	1	5	Finn Allen	New Zealand	Pre-signed player
Perth Scorchers	2	16	Passed		
Perth Scorchers	3	17	Laurie Evans	England	
Perth Scorchers	4	28	David Payne	England	
Sydney Sixers	1	7	Sam Curran	England	
Sydney Sixers	2	14	Babar Azam	Pakistan	Pre-signed player
Sydney Sixers	3	19	Passed		
Sydney Sixers	4	30	Jafer Chohan	England	
Sydney Thunder	1	8	Lockie Ferguson	New Zealand	
Sydney Thunder	2	12	Shadab Khan	Pakistan	
Sydney Thunder	3	21	Sam Billings	England	Pre-signed player
Sydney Thunder	4	32	Passed		

== Squads ==
Squads contracted for the 2025–26 Big Bash League season
Adelaide Strikers	Brisbane Heat	Hobart Hurricanes	Melbourne Renegades	Melbourne Stars	Perth Scorchers	Sydney Sixers	Sydney Thunder
Matt Short (c); Hassan Ali (PAK); Cameron Boyce; Jordan Buckingham; Alex Carey; Mackenzie Harvey; ~~Travis Head~~; Thomas Kelly; Chris Lynn; Harry Manenti (Note: Local replacement player); Harry Nielsen; Jamie Overton (ENG); Lloyd Pope; Alex Ross; Jason Sangha; Liam Scott; Tabraiz Shamsi (SA) (Note: International replacement player); Tom Straker; Henry Thornton; Jerrssis Wadia; Luke Wood (ENG)	Usman Khawaja (c); Shaheen Afridi (PAK); Tom Alsop (ENG); Thomas Balkin; Xavier Bartlett; Max Bryant; Paddy Dooley; Liam Haskett; Lachlan Hearne; Spencer Johnson; Zaman Khan (PAK); Matthew Kuhnemann; Marnus Labuschagne; Nathan McSweeney; Colin Munro (NZL); Michael Neser; Oliver Patterson; Jimmy Peirson; Matt Renshaw; Callum Vidler; Hugh Weibgen; Jack Wildermuth; Jack Wood	Nathan Ellis (c); Rehan Ahmed (ENG); Marcus Bean; Jackson Bird; Hugo Burdon; Iain Carlisle; Nikhil Chaudhary; Tim David; Rishad Hossain (BAN); Chris Jordan (ENG); Ben McDermott; Riley Meredith; Mitch Owen; Will Prestwidge; Billy Stanlake; Matthew Wade; Charlie Wakim; Beau Webster; ~~Jake Weatherald~~; Mac Wright	Will Sutherland (c); Michael Archer; Jason Behrendorff; Josh Brown; Harry Dixon; Brendan Doggett; Sam Elliott; Jake Fraser-McGurk; Caleb Jewell; Hassan Khan (PAK); Nathan Lyon; Fergus O'Neill; Ollie Peake; Mohammad Rizwan (PAK); Tom Rogers; Tim Seifert (NZL); Matthew Spoors (CAN); Andrew Tye; Adam Zampa	Marcus Stoinis (c); Austin Anlezark; ~~Scott Boland~~; Hilton Cartwright; Joe Clarke (ENG); Tom Curran (ENG); Sam Hain (ENG); Sam Harper; Liam Hatcher; Campbell Kellaway; Blake Macdonald; Glenn Maxwell; Hamish McKenzie; Jon Merlo; Haris Rauf (PAK); Tom Rogers; Aryan Sharma; Peter Siddle; Mark Steketee; Mitchell Swepson; Tom Whitney	Ashton Turner (c); Ashton Agar; Finn Allen (NZL); Mahli Beardman; Cooper Connolly; Brody Couch; Joel Curtis; Laurie Evans (ENG); Sam Fanning; Aaron Hardie; Nick Hobson; Luke Holt; Josh Inglis; Bryce Jackson; Matthew Kelly; Mitchell Marsh; Lance Morris; Joel Paris; David Payne (ENG); Jhye Richardson; Corey Rocchiccioli	Moises Henriques (c); Sean Abbott; Babar Azam (PAK); Jafer Chohan (ENG); Sam Curran (ENG); Joel Davies; Ben Dwarshuis; Jack Edwards; Josh Hazlewood (Note: Supplementary player); Daniel Hughes; Hayden Kerr; Riley Kingsell; Ben Manenti; Todd Murphy; Mitchell Perry; Josh Philippe; Kane Richardson; Lachlan Shaw; Jordan Silk; Harjas Singh; Steve Smith; Mitchell Starc; Charlie Stobo	David Warner (c); Wes Agar; Charlie Anderson; Tom Andrews; ~~Ravichandran Ashwin (IND)~~ (Note: Player withdrew from tournament); Cameron Bancroft; Sam Billings (ENG); Pat Cummins; Ollie Davies; Lockie Ferguson (NZL); Matthew Gilkes; Chris Green; Ryan Hadley; Shadab Khan (PAK); Sam Konstas; Nic Maddinson; Nathan McAndrew; Blake Nikitaras; Aidan O'Connor; Daniel Sams; Tanveer Sangha; Reece Topley (ENG); David Willey (ENG)

Notes

- Unless otherwise specified, all players are Australian.
- Starting from the 2023–24 season, teams were allowed to sign up to two marquee supplementary players who would not count as part of their regular 18-player squad. These players must be signed to the Australia national cricket team.

== Venues ==
Adelaide	Brisbane	Melbourne		Perth
Adelaide Oval	The Gabba	Docklands Stadium	Melbourne Cricket Ground	Perth Stadium
Capacity: 53,500	Capacity: 36,000	Capacity: 48,000	Capacity: 100,000	Capacity: 60,000
Geelong	2025–26 Big Bash League season is located in Australia			Coffs Harbour
Kardinia Park	2025–26 Big Bash League season is located in Australia			Coffs Harbour International Stadium
Capacity: 40,000	2025–26 Big Bash League season is located in Australia			Capacity: 10,000
Hobart	2025–26 Big Bash League season is located in Australia			Sydney
Bellerive Oval	2025–26 Big Bash League season is located in Australia			Sydney Showground Stadium
Capacity: 19,500	2025–26 Big Bash League season is located in Australia			Capacity: 23,500
Canberra	2025–26 Big Bash League season is located in Australia			Sydney
Manuka Oval	2025–26 Big Bash League season is located in Australia			Sydney Cricket Ground
Capacity: 13,500	2025–26 Big Bash League season is located in Australia			Capacity: 48,000

== Standings ==
=== Points table ===
Pos	Team	Pld	W	L	NR	Pts	NRR	Qualification
1	Perth Scorchers (C)	10	7	3	0	14	1.363	Advanced to the Qualifier
2	Sydney Sixers (R)	10	6	3	1	13	0.605	Advanced to the Qualifier
3	Hobart Hurricanes	10	6	3	1	13	0.331	Advanced to the Knockout
4	Melbourne Stars	10	6	4	0	12	0.759	Advanced to the Knockout
5	Brisbane Heat	10	5	5	0	10	−0.431	
6	Adelaide Strikers	10	4	6	0	8	−0.231	
7	Melbourne Renegades	10	3	7	0	6	−1.202	
8	Sydney Thunder	10	2	8	0	4	−1.212	

Source: ESPNcricinfo
(C) Champions; (R) Runners-up

=== Win–loss table ===
Below is a summary of results for each team's ten regular season matches, plus finals where applicable, in chronological order. A team's opponent for any given match is listed above the margin of victory/defeat.

Team	League stage										Play-offs				Pos.
Team	1	2	3	4	5	6	7	8	9	10	Q	K	C	F	Pos.
Adelaide; Strikers (ADS)	SYS; 3 wickets	MLS; 6 wickets	BRH; 7 runs	BRH; 7 wickets	PRS; 33 runs	SYT; 6 runs	HBH; 37 runs	PRS; 32 runs	MLS; 6 wickets	MLR; 8 wickets	X	X	X	X	6th
Brisbane; Heat (BRH)	MLR; 14 runs	PRS; 8 wickets	SYT; 34 runs	ADS; 7 runs	ADS; 7 wickets	MLS; 4 wickets	SYS; 3 wickets	SYT; 7 wickets	HBH; 3 runs	SYS; 5 wickets	X	X	X	X	5th
Hobart; Hurricanes (HBH)	SYT; 4 wickets	MLS; 8 wickets	MLR; 7 wickets	PRS; 4 wickets	MLR; 4 wickets	PRS; 40 runs	SYT; 6 wickets	ADS; 37 runs	SYS; N/R	BRH; 3 runs	→	MLS; 3 runs (DLS)	SYS; 57 runs	X	3rd (CF)
Melbourne; Renegades (MLR)	BRH; 14 runs	HBH; 7 wickets	HBH; 4 wickets	SYS; 6 wickets	MLS; 4 wickets	PRS; 4 wickets	MLS; 8 wickets	SYT; 4 wickets (DLS)	PRS; 50 runs	ADS; 8 wickets	X	X	X	X	7th
Melbourne; Stars (MLS)	HBH; 8 wickets	ADS; 6 wickets	SYS; 7 wickets	SYT; 9 wickets	BRH; 4 wickets	MLR; 4 wickets	SYS; 6 wickets	MLR; 8 wickets	ADS; 6 wickets	PRS; 6 wickets	→	HBH; 3 runs (DLS)	X	X	4th (KO)
Perth; Scorchers (PRS)	SYS; 5 wickets	BRH; 8 wickets	HBH; 4 wickets	SYT; 71 runs	HBH; 40 runs	ADS; 33 runs	MLR; 4 wickets	ADS; 32 runs	MLR; 50 runs	MLS; 6 wickets	SYS; 48 runs	→	→	SYS; 6 wickets	1st (C)
Sydney; Sixers (SYS)	PRS; 5 wickets	ADS; 3 wickets	SYT; 47 runs	MLS; 7 wickets	MLR; 6 wickets	BRH; 3 wickets	MLS; 6 wickets	HBH; N/R	SYT; 5 wickets	BRH; 5 wickets	PRS; 48 runs	→	HBH; 57 runs	PRS; 6 wickets	2nd (RU)
Sydney; Thunder (SYT)	HBH; 4 wickets	SYS; 47 runs	BRH; 34 runs	MLS; 9 wickets	PRS; 71 runs	HBH; 6 wickets	ADS; 6 runs	BRH; 7 wickets	MLR; 4 wickets (DLS)	SYS; 5 wickets	X	X	X	X	8th

Team's results→	Won	Lost	N/R

=== Match summary ===
Team	Group matches										Playoffs		
Team	1	2	3	4	5	6	7	8	9	10	Q/K	C	F
Adelaide Strikers	2	2	2	4	4	6	6	6	6	8			
Brisbane Heat	0	2	2	4	4	6	6	8	10	10			
Hobart Hurricanes	2	2	4	6	8	8	10	12	13	13	W	L	
Melbourne Renegades	2	2	2	2	4	6	6	6	6	6			
Melbourne Stars	2	4	6	8	8	8	8	10	12	12	L		
Perth Scorchers	2	2	2	4	6	8	8	10	12	14	W		W
Sydney Sixers	0	0	2	2	4	6	8	9	11	13	L	W	L
Sydney Thunder	0	0	2	2	2	2	2	2	4	4			

Win	Loss	No result

- Note: The total points at the end of each group match are listed.
- Note: Click on the points (group matches) or W/L (playoffs) to see the match summary.

Visitor team →	ADS	BRH	HBH	MLR	MLS	PRS	SYS	SYT
Home team ↓	ADS	BRH	HBH	MLR	MLS	PRS	SYS	SYT
Adelaide Strikers		Strikers; 7 wickets		Strikers; 8 wickets	Stars; 6 wickets	Scorchers; 32 runs		Strikers; 6 runs
Brisbane Heat	Heat; 7 runs				Heat; 4 wickets	Heat; 8 wickets	Sixers; 5 wickets	Heat; 7 wickets
Hobart Hurricanes	Hurricanes; 37 runs	Heat; 3 runs		Hurricanes; 4 wickets		Scorchers; 40 runs		Hurricanes; 4 wickets
Melbourne Renegades		Renegades; 14 runs	Hurricanes; 7 wickets		Stars; 8 wickets	Scorchers; 50 runs	Sixers; 6 wickets	
Melbourne Stars	Stars; 6 wickets		Stars; 8 wickets	Renegades; 4 wickets			Sixers; 6 wickets	Stars; 9 wickets
Perth Scorchers	Scorchers; 33 runs		Hurricanes; 4 wickets	Renegades; 4 wickets	Scorchers; 6 wickets		Scorchers; 5 wickets	
Sydney Sixers	Strikers; 3 wickets	Sixers; 3 wickets	Match abandoned		Stars; 7 wickets			Sixers; 5 wickets
Sydney Thunder		Thunder; 34 runs	Hurricanes; 6 wickets	Thunder; 4 wickets (DLS)		Scorchers; 71 runs	Sixers; 47 runs	

Home team won	Visitor team won

- Note: Results listed are according to the home (horizontal) and visitor (vertical) teams.
- Note: Click on a result to see a summary of the match.

== League stage ==
On 3 July 2025, Cricket Australia confirmed the full schedule for the tournament.

Match 1
14 December 2025
19:15 (D/N)
Scorecard

Sydney Sixers; 5/113 (11 overs)	v	Perth Scorchers; 5/117 (10.1 overs)
Jack Edwards 46* (21); Brody Couch 2/12 (2 overs)		Cooper Connolly 59 (31); Ben Dwarshuis 2/36 (3 overs)

Perth Scorchers won by 5 wickets
Perth Stadium, Perth
Attendance: 26,823
Umpires: Gerard Abood and Donovan Koch
Player of the match: Cooper Connolly (Perth Scorchers)

- Perth Scorchers won the toss and elected to field.
- The match was reduced to 11 overs per side due to rain.

Match 2
15 December 2025
19:15 (N)
Scorecard

Melbourne Renegades; 5/212 (20 overs)	v	Brisbane Heat; 8/198 (20 overs)
Tim Seifert 102 (56); Jack Wildermuth 3/34 (4 overs)		Colin Munro 55 (32); Will Sutherland 3/33 (4 overs)

Melbourne Renegades won by 14 runs
Kardinia Stadium, Geelong
Attendance: 10,043
Umpires: Phillip Gillespie and Sam Nogajski
Player of the match: Tim Seifert (Melbourne Renegades)

- Brisbane Heat won the toss and elected to field.

Match 3
16 December 2025
19:15 (N)
Scorecard

Sydney Thunder; 6/180 (20 overs)	v	Hobart Hurricanes; 6/181 (19.5 overs)
Cameron Bancroft 61 (44); Billy Stanlake 3/34 (4 overs)		Nikhil Chaudhary 41 (31); Shadab Khan 2/36 (4 overs)

Hobart Hurricanes won by 4 wickets
Bellerive Oval, Hobart
Attendance: 6,217
Umpires: Michael Graham-Smith and Sharad Patel
Player of the match: Chris Jordan (Hobart Hurricanes)

- Hobart Hurricanes won the toss and elected to field.

Match 4
17 December 2025
19:15 (N)
Scorecard

Sydney Sixers; 9/159 (20 overs)	v	Adelaide Strikers; 7/160 (19.2 overs)
Josh Philippe 46 (28); Luke Wood 3/26 (4 overs)		Liam Scott 51 (32); Jack Edwards 2/27 (4 overs)

Adelaide Strikers won by 3 wickets
Sydney Cricket Ground, Sydney
Attendance: 20,110
Umpires: Gerard Abood and Phillip Gillespie
Player of the match: Jamie Overton (Adelaide Strikers)

- Adelaide Strikers won the toss and elected to field.

Match 5
18 December 2025
19:15 (N)
Scorecard

Hobart Hurricanes; 9/158 (20 overs)	v	Melbourne Stars; 2/159 (16 overs)
Ben McDermott 69 (52); Peter Siddle 3/30 (4 overs)		Marcus Stoinis 62* (31); Rishad Hossain 2/33 (3 overs)

Melbourne Stars won by 8 wickets
Melbourne Cricket Ground, Melbourne
Attendance: 19,034
Umpires: Donovan Koch and Sam Nogajski
Player of the match: Marcus Stoinis (Melbourne Stars)

- Melbourne Stars won the toss and elected to field.

Match 6
19 December 2025
19:15 (N)
Scorecard

Perth Scorchers; 6/257 (20 overs)	v	Brisbane Heat; 2/258 (19.5 overs)
Finn Allen 79 (38); Xavier Bartlett 2/44 (4 overs)		Jack Wildermuth 110* (54); Jhye Richardson 1/49 (4 overs)

Brisbane Heat won by 8 wickets
The Gabba, Brisbane
Attendance: 24,277
Umpires: Daryl Brigham and Phillip Gillespie
Player of the match: Matt Renshaw (Brisbane Heat)

- Brisbane Heat won the toss and elected to field.
- Matt Renshaw (Brisbane Heat) and Jack Wildermuth (Brisbane Heat) scored their maiden centuries in T20s.
- This was the highest successful run chase in BBL history.

Match 7
20 December 2025
19:15 (N)
Scorecard

Sydney Sixers; 5/198 (20 overs)	v	Sydney Thunder; 151 (19.1 overs)
Josh Philippe 96 (57); Reece Topley 3/41 (4 overs)		Sam Billings 51 (28); Jack Edwards 5/26 (4 overs)

Sydney Sixers won by 47 runs
Sydney Showground Stadium, Sydney
Attendance: 20,568
Umpires: Donovan Koch and Sam Nogajski
Player of the match: Josh Philippe (Sydney Sixers)

- Sydney Thunder won the toss and elected to field.
- Jack Edwards (Sydney Sixers) scored his first five-wicket haul in T20s.

Match 8
21 December 2025
19:15 (N)
Scorecard

Melbourne Renegades; 9/145 (20 overs)	v	Hobart Hurricanes; 3/149 (13.5 overs)
Tim Seifert 34 (21); Chris Jordan 4/19 (4 overs)		Nikhil Chaudhary 79 (38); Jason Behrendorff 2/35 (3 overs)

Hobart Hurricanes won by 7 wickets
Kardinia Stadium, Geelong
Attendance: 10,267
Umpires: Gerard Abood and Stephen Dionysius
Player of the match: Chris Jordan (Hobart Hurricanes)

- Hobart Hurricanes won the toss and elected to field.
- Tim Ward (Hobart Hurricanes) made his T20 debut.

Match 9
22 December 2025
19:15 (N)
Scorecard

Sydney Thunder; 4/193 (20 overs)	v	Brisbane Heat; 6/159 (20 overs)
Matthew Gilkes 76 (48); Jack Wildermuth 2/25 (4 overs)		Matt Renshaw 43 (28); Shadab Khan 4/24 (4 overs)

Sydney Thunder won by 34 runs
Manuka Oval, Canberra
Umpires: Shawn Craig and Claire Polosak
Player of the match: Matthew Gilkes (Sydney Thunder)

- Brisbane Heat won the toss and elected to field.

Match 10
23 December 2025
19:15 (N)
Scorecard

Adelaide Strikers; 8/155 (20 overs)	v	Melbourne Stars; 4/161 (18.1 overs)
Matthew Short 56 (42); Haris Rauf 3/28 (4 overs)		Sam Harper 55 (36); Hasan Ali 2/25 (3 overs)

Melbourne Stars won by 6 wickets
Adelaide Oval, Adelaide
Attendance: 26,025
Umpires: Gerard Abood and Sam Nogajski
Player of the match: Tom Curran (Melbourne Stars)

- Melbourne Stars won the toss and elected to field.
- Jerrssis Wadia (Adelaide Strikers) made his T20 debut.

Match 11
26 December 2025
18:05 (N)
Scorecard

Sydney Sixers; 144 (20 overs)	v	Melbourne Stars; 3/145 (17.3 overs)
Daniel Hughes 60 (42); Peter Siddle 3/23 (4 overs)		Sam Harper 110* (60); Joel Davies 2/16 (4 overs)

Melbourne Stars won by 7 wickets
Sydney Cricket Ground, Sydney
Attendance: 25,589
Umpires: Gerard Abood and Troy Penman
Player of the match: Sam Harper (Melbourne Stars)

- Melbourne Stars won the toss and elected to field.
- Sam Harper (Melbourne Stars) scored his maiden century in T20s.

Match 12
26 December 2025
21:15 (N)
Scorecard

Perth Scorchers; 8/150 (20 overs)	v	Hobart Hurricanes; 6/153 (19.3 overs)
Finn Allen 43 (23); Rishad Hossain 3/33 (4 overs)		Tim David 42* (28); Cooper Connolly 3/23 (3 overs)

Hobart Hurricanes won by 4 wickets
Perth Stadium, Perth
Attendance: 42,620
Umpires: Shawn Craig and Michael Graham-Smith
Player of the match: Tim David (Hobart Hurricanes)

- Hobart Hurricanes won the toss and elected to field.

Match 13
27 December 2025
19:15 (N)
Scorecard

Brisbane Heat; 9/179 (20 overs)	v	Adelaide Strikers; 172 (19.5 overs)
Max Bryant 63 (32); Matthew Short 2/13 (3 overs)		Matthew Short 63 (39); Xavier Bartlett 3/26 (4 overs)

Brisbane Heat won by 7 runs
The Gabba, Brisbane
Attendance: 29,210
Umpires: Stephen Dionysius and Donovan Koch
Player of the match: Xavier Bartlett (Brisbane Heat)

- Adelaide Strikers won the toss and elected to field.
- Thomas Balkin (Brisbane Heat) made his T20 debut.

Match 14
28 December 2025
19:15 (N)
Scorecard

Sydney Thunder; 128 (20 overs)	v	Melbourne Stars; 1/132 (14 overs)
Shadab Khan 25 (24); Haris Rauf 3/29 (4 overs)		Joe Clarke 60 (37); Chris Green 1/8 (2 overs)

Melbourne Stars won by 9 wickets
Manuka Oval, Canberra
Umpires: Daryl Brigham and Troy Penman
Player of the match: Haris Rauf (Melbourne Stars)

- Melbourne Stars won the toss and elected to field.
- Ryan Hadley (Sydney Thunder) made his T20 debut.
- Cameron Bancroft (Sydney Thunder) scored his 2,000th BBL run.

Match 15
29 December 2025
19:15 (N)
Scorecard

Melbourne Renegades; 9/162 (20 overs)	v	Hobart Hurricanes; 6/163 (19 overs)
Oliver Peake 29 (22); Nathan Ellis 3/30 (4 overs)		Matthew Wade 43* (20); Adam Zampa 3/25 (4 overs)

Hobart Hurricanes won by 4 wickets
Bellerive Oval, Hobart
Attendance: 9,195
Umpires: Shawn Craig and Chris Grant
Player of the match: Nathan Ellis (Hobart Hurricanes)

- Hobart Hurricanes won the toss and elected to field.

Match 16
30 December 2025
19:15 (N)
Scorecard

Perth Scorchers; 8/202 (20 overs)	v	Sydney Thunder; 131 (17.3 overs)
Ashton Turner 99* (41); Daniel Sams 4/51 (4 overs)		Matthew Gilkes 33 (19); Aaron Hardie 2/7 (2 overs)

Perth Scorchers won by 71 runs
Sydney Showground Stadium, Sydney
Attendance: 15,020
Umpires: Donovan Koch and Sharad Patel
Player of the match: Ashton Turner (Perth Scorchers)

- Sydney Thunder won the toss and elected to field.

Match 17
31 December 2025
19:15 (N)
Scorecard

Brisbane Heat; 121 (19.4 overs)	v	Adelaide Strikers; 3/125 (14.1 overs)
Matthew Kuhnemann 31* (22); Jamie Overton 3/19 (4 overs)		Chris Lynn 79* (41); Oliver Patterson 1/15 (2 overs)

Adelaide Strikers won by 7 wickets
Adelaide Oval, Adelaide
Attendance: 40,713
Umpires: Michael Graham-Smith and Troy Penman
Player of the match: Liam Scott (Adelaide Strikers)

- Adelaide Strikers won the toss and elected to field.
- Lachlan Hearne and Oliver Patterson (Brisbane Heat) both made their T20 debuts.
- Chris Lynn (Adelaide Strikers) became the first player to score 4,000 career runs in the BBL.

Match 18
1 January 2026
16:00 (D/N)
Scorecard

Melbourne Renegades; 9/164 (20 overs)	v	Sydney Sixers; 4/168 (19.1 overs)
Josh Brown 43 (19); Sean Abbott 3/16 (4 overs)		Babar Azam 58* (46); Gurinder Sandhu 2/23 (4 overs)

Sydney Sixers won by 6 wickets
Docklands Stadium, Melbourne
Attendance: 26,865
Umpires: Stephen Dionysius and Sharad Patel
Player of the match: Sean Abbott (Sydney Sixers)

- Sydney Sixers won the toss and elected to field.

Match 19
1 January 2026
19:15 (N)
Scorecard

Perth Scorchers; 3/229 (20 overs)	v	Hobart Hurricanes; 9/189 (20 overs)
Mitchell Marsh 102 (58); Nathan Ellis 2/44 (4 overs)		Nikhil Chaudhary 31 (15); Ashton Agar 3/38 (4 overs)

Perth Scorchers won by 40 runs
Bellerive Oval, Hobart
Attendance: 9,436
Umpires: Donovan Koch and Ben Treloar
Player of the match: Mitchell Marsh (Perth Scorchers)

- Hobart Hurricanes won the toss and elected to field.

Match 20
2 January 2026
19:15 (N)
Scorecard

Melbourne Stars; 6/195 (20 overs)	v	Brisbane Heat; 6/199 (19.4 overs)
Marcus Stoinis 43 (35); Thomas Balkin 2/35 (4 overs)		Max Bryant 48* (26); Mitchell Swepson 2/30 (3 overs)

Brisbane Heat won by 4 wickets
The Gabba, Brisbane
Attendance: 31,948
Umpires: Roberto Howard and Troy Penman
Player of the match: Max Bryant (Brisbane Heat)

- Brisbane Heat won the toss and elected to field.

Match 21
3 January 2026
19:15 (N)
Scorecard

Sydney Thunder; 4/205 (20 overs)	v	Hobart Hurricanes; 4/207 (17.5 overs)
David Warner 130* (65); Will Prestwidge 2/19 (2 overs)		Tim Ward 90 (49); Daniel Sams 3/36 (3 overs)

Hobart Hurricanes won by 6 wickets
Sydney Showground Stadium, Sydney
Attendance: 14,466
Umpires: Mitch Claydon and Michael Graham-Smith
Player of the match: David Warner (Sydney Thunder)

- Hobart Hurricanes won the toss and elected to field.

Match 22
4 January 2026
18:05 (N)
Scorecard

Melbourne Stars; 9/173 (20 overs)	v	Melbourne Renegades; 6/177 (19.5 overs)
Tom Curran 38 (18); Gurinder Sandhu 4/41 (4 overs)		Josh Brown 84 (48); Peter Siddle 2/39 (4 overs)

Melbourne Renegades won by 4 wickets
Melbourne Cricket Ground, Melbourne
Umpires: Gerard Abood and Donovan Koch
Player of the match: Josh Brown (Melbourne Renegades)

- Melbourne Renegades won the toss and elected to field.

Match 23
4 January 2026
21:15 (N)
Scorecard

Perth Scorchers; 8/153 (20 overs)	v	Adelaide Strikers; 120 (18.1 overs)
Mitchell Marsh 37 (33); Lloyd Pope 4/23 (4 overs)		Liam Scott 33 (28); Joel Paris 3/22 (4 overs)

Perth Scorchers won by 33 runs
Perth Stadium, Perth
Umpires: Eloise Sheridan and Ben Treloar
Player of the match: Joel Paris (Perth Scorchers)

- Adelaide Strikers won the toss and elected to field.
- Joel Curtis (Perth Scorchers) made his T20 debut.

Match 24
5 January 2026
19:15 (N)
Scorecard

Brisbane Heat; 114/9 (20 overs)	v	Sydney Sixers; 7/118 (18.4 overs)
Jack Wildermuth 31 (17); Joel Davies 2/19 (4 overs)		Joel Davies 35* (26); Matthew Kuhnemann 2/14 (4 overs)

Sydney Sixers won by 3 wickets
Coffs Harbour International Stadium, Coffs Harbour
Umpires: Michael Graham-Smith and Sharad Patel
Player of the match: Joel Davies (Sydney Sixers)

- Sydney Sixers won the toss and elected to field.

Match 25
6 January 2026
19:15 (N)
Scorecard

Adelaide Strikers; 8/165 (20 overs)	v	Sydney Thunder; 7/159 (20 overs)
Liam Scott 49* (32); Wes Agar 3/16 (3 overs)		David Warner 67* (51); Jamie Overton 3/25 (4 overs)

Adelaide Strikers won by 6 runs
Adelaide Oval, Adelaide
Umpires: Andrew Crozier and Riki Wessels
Player of the match: Jamie Overton (Adelaide Strikers)

- Sydney Thunder won the toss and elected to field.

Match 26
7 January 2026
19:15 (D/N)
Scorecard

Perth Scorchers; 127 (19.2 overs)	v	Melbourne Renegades; 6/130 (20 overs)
Aaron Hardie 44 (40); Gurinder Sandhu 4/28 (4 overs)		Oliver Peake 42* (30); Ashton Turner 1/1 (1 over)

Melbourne Renegades won by 4 wickets
Perth Stadium, Perth
Umpires: Eloise Sheridan and Ben Treloar
Player of the match: Oliver Peake (Melbourne Renegades)

- Melbourne Renegades won the toss and elected to field.

Match 27
8 January 2026
19:15 (N)
Scorecard

Melbourne Stars; 128 (19.5 overs)	v	Sydney Sixers; 4/129 (17.1 overs)
Blake Macdonald 33 (22); Ben Dwarshuis 4/13 (3.5 overs)		Josh Philippe 35 (25); Marcus Stoinis 2/20 (4 overs)

Sydney Sixers won by 6 wickets
Melbourne Cricket Ground, Melbourne
Umpires: Mitchell Claydon and Andrew Crozier
Player of the match: Joel Davies (Sydney Sixers)

- Sydney Sixers won the toss and elected to field.

Match 28
9 January 2026
19:15 (N)
Scorecard

Hobart Hurricanes; 6/178 (20 overs)	v	Adelaide Strikers; 9/141 (20 overs)
Mitchell Owen 33 (9); Jamie Overton 2/13 (2 overs)		Liam Scott 91* (58); Rishad Hossain 3/26 (4 overs)

Hobart Hurricanes won by 37 runs
Bellerive Oval, Hobart
Umpires: Roberto Howard and Troy Penman
Player of the match: Nathan Ellis (Hobart Hurricanes)

- Adelaide Strikers won the toss and elected to field.

Match 29
10 January 2026
16:00 (D/N)
Scorecard

Sydney Thunder; 6/180 (20 overs)	v	Brisbane Heat; 3/183 (16.2 overs)
David Warner 82 (56); Matt Renshaw 2/29 (4 overs)		Usman Khawaja 78 (48); Wes Agar 1/27 (2 overs)

Brisbane Heat won by 7 wickets
The Gabba, Brisbane
Umpires: Chris Grant and Ben Treloar
Player of the match: Usman Khawaja (Brisbane Heat)

- Sydney Thunder won the toss and elected to bat.
- Sydney Thunder were eliminated from finals contention as a result of this match.

Match 30
10 January 2026
19:15 (N)
Scorecard

Melbourne Renegades; 7/166 (20 overs)	v	Melbourne Stars; 2/170 (15.5 overs)
Josh Brown 80 (50); Marcus Stoinis 3/33 (4 overs)		Sam Harper 84* (51); Hassan Khan 1/20 (3 overs)

Melbourne Stars won by 8 wickets
Docklands Stadium, Melbourne
Umpires: Sam Nogajski (Aus) and Riki Wessels (Eng)
Player of the match: Sam Harper (Melbourne Stars)

- Melbourne Stars won the toss and elected to field.

Match 31
11 January 2026
14:05
Scorecard

Sydney Sixers; 0/32 (5 overs)	v	Hobart Hurricanes
Steven Smith 19* (16)

No result
Sydney Cricket Ground, Sydney
Umpires: Claire Polosak and Eloise Sheridan

- Hobart Hurricanes won the toss and elected to field.
- No further play was possible due to rain.
- Hobart Hurricanes secured their finals spot as a result of this match.

Match 32
11 January 2026
19:15 (N)
Scorecard

Perth Scorchers; 4/232 (20 overs)	v	Adelaide Strikers; 8/200 (20 overs)
Mitchell Marsh 88 (51); Lloyd Pope 2/36 (4 overs)		Alex Carey 71 (39); David Payne 3/35 (4 overs)

Perth Scorchers won by 32 runs
Adelaide Oval, Adelaide
Umpires: Mitchell Claydon and Andrew Crozier
Player of the match: Mitchell Marsh (Perth Scorchers)

- Adelaide Strikers won the toss and elected to field.
- Luke Holt (Perth Scorchers) made his T20 debut.
- Mitchell Marsh hit his 100th six in the BBL.

Match 33
12 January 2026
19:15 (N)
Scorecard

Melbourne Renegades; 8/170 (20 overs)	v	Sydney Thunder; 6/140 (15.2 overs)
Hassan Khan 46 (31); Wes Agar 2/23 (4 overs)		Chris Green 34* (13); Gurinder Sandhu 4/42 (4 overs)

Sydney Thunder won by 4 wickets (DLS method)
Sydney Showground Stadium, Sydney
Umpires: Sam Nogajski and Troy Penman
Player of the match: Chris Green (Sydney Thunder)

- Sydney Thunder won the toss and elected to field.
- Sydney Thunder were set a revised target of 140 runs from 16 overs due to rain.

Match 34
13 January 2026
19:15 (N)
Scorecard

Adelaide Strikers; 83 (19.3 overs)	v	Melbourne Stars; 4/86 (15.1 overs)
Cameron Boyce 20 (18); Tom Curran 4/10 (4 overs)		Tom Rogers 32 (40); Liam Scott 2/12 (2.1 overs)

Melbourne Stars won by 6 wickets
Melbourne Cricket Ground
Umpires: Gerard Abood and Ben Treloar
Player of the match: Tom Curran (Melbourne Stars)

- Melbourne Stars won the toss and elected to field.
- Melbourne Stars secured a spot in the finals, while Adelaide Strikers were eliminated from finals contention as a result of this match.

Match 35
14 January 2026
19:15 (N)
Scorecard

Brisbane Heat; 8/160 (20 overs)	v	Hobart Hurricanes; 8/157 (20 overs)
Nathan McSweeney 49 (32); Riley Meredith 3/40 (4 overs)		Ben McDermott 59 (36); Xavier Bartlett 3/44 (4 overs)

Brisbane Heat won by 3 runs
Bellerive Oval, Hobart
Umpires: Michael Graham-Smith (Aus) and Riki Wessels (Eng)
Player of the match: Matthew Kuhnemann (Brisbane Heat)

- Hobart Hurricanes won the toss and elected to field.

Match 36
15 January 2026
19:15 (N)
Scorecard

Perth Scorchers; 7/219 (20 overs)	v	Melbourne Renegades; 7/169 (20 overs)
Finn Allen 101 (53); Sam Elliott 4/28 (3 overs)		Tim Seifert 66 (43); Cooper Connolly 2/23 (4 overs)

Perth Scorchers won by 50 runs
Docklands Stadium, Melbourne
Umpires: Sam Nogajski and Ben Treloar
Player of the match: Finn Allen (Perth Scorchers)

- Melbourne Renegades won the toss and elected to field.
- Perth Scorchers secured a spot in the finals, while Melbourne Renegades were eliminated from finals contention as a result of this match.
- This was the last BBL match at Docklands Stadium.

Match 37
16 January 2026
19:15 (N)
Scorecard

Sydney Thunder; 6/189 (20 overs)	v	Sydney Sixers; 5/191 (17.2 overs)
David Warner 110* (65); Sam Curran 3/28 (4 overs)		Steve Smith 100 (42); Nathan McAndrew 2/34 (2 overs)

Sydney Sixers won by 5 wickets
Sydney Cricket Ground, Sydney
Umpires: Gerard Abood and Andrew Crozier
Player of the match: Steve Smith (Sydney Sixers)

- Sydney Sixers won the toss and elected to field.
- Aidan O'Connor (Sydney Thunder) made his T20 debut.

Match 38
17 January 2026
17:00 (D/N)
Scorecard

Melbourne Renegades; 99 (16.5 overs)	v	Adelaide Strikers; 2/100 (11.5 overs)
Will Sutherland 38 (28); Tabraiz Shamsi 4/15 (3.5 overs)		Matthew Short 30 (22); Callum Stow 1/8 (2 overs)

Adelaide Strikers won by 8 wickets
Adelaide Oval, Adelaide
Umpires: Donovan Koch and Troy Penman
Player of the match: Tabraiz Shamsi (Adelaide Strikers)

- Adelaide Strikers won the toss and elected to field.
- Michael Archer (Melbourne Renegades) made his T20 debut.

Match 39
17 January 2026
20:15 (D/N)
Scorecard

Melbourne Stars; 130 (18.2 overs)	v	Perth Scorchers; 4/134 (16.5 overs)
Marcus Stoinis 55 (39); Jhye Richardson 4/16 (3.2 overs)		Finn Allen 69 (39); Haris Rauf 3/23 (4 overs)

Perth Scorchers won by 6 wickets
Perth Stadium, Perth
Umpires: Michael Graham-Smith and Sam Nogajski
Player of the match: Jhye Richardson (Perth Scorchers)

- Perth Scorchers won the toss and elected to field.

Match 40
18 January 2026
19:15 (N)
Scorecard

Brisbane Heat; 9/171 (20 overs)	v	Sydney Sixers; 5/177 (18.4 overs)
Nathan McSweeney 69* (54); Mitchell Starc 4/35 (4 overs)		Steve Smith 54 (40); Xavier Bartlett 2/32 (3.4 overs)

Sydney Sixers won by 5 wickets
The Gabba, Brisbane
Umpires: Gerard Abood and Ben Treloar
Player of the match: Sam Curran (Sydney Sixers)

- Sydney Sixers won the toss and elected to field.
- Sydney Sixers secured a spot in the finals, while Brisbane Heat were eliminated from finals contention as a result of this match.

== Play-offs ==
Qualifier
20 January 2026
1	Perth Scorchers	9/147 (20 overs)
2	Sydney Sixers	99 (15 overs)
Knockout
21 January 2026
3	Hobart Hurricanes	5/114 (10 overs)
4	Melbourne Stars	4/81 (7 overs)

Challenger
23 January 2026
2	Sydney Sixers	8/198 (20 overs)
3	Hobart Hurricanes	141 (17.2 overs)

Final
25 January 2026
1	Perth Scorchers	4/133 (17.3 overs)
2	Sydney Sixers	132 (20 overs)

=== Qualifier ===
Qualifier
20 January 2026
19:30 (N)
Scorecard

Perth Scorchers; 9/147 (20 overs)	v	Sydney Sixers; 99 (15 overs)
Finn Allen 49 (30); Ben Dwarshuis 2/23 (4 overs)		Steve Smith 37 (24); Mahli Beardman 3/20 (3 overs)

Perth Scorchers won by 48 runs
Perth Stadium, Perth
Umpires: Gerard Abood and Sam Nogajski
Player of the match: Finn Allen (Perth Scorchers)

- Sydney Sixers won the toss and elected to field.

=== Knockout ===
Knockout
21 January 2026
19:30 (N)
Scorecard

Hobart Hurricanes; 5/114 (10 overs)	v	Melbourne Stars; 4/81 (7 overs)
Beau Webster 47 (26); Haris Rauf 2/27 (2 overs)		Joe Clarke 31 (17); Riley Meredith 2/19 (2 overs)

Hobart Hurricanes won by 3 runs (DLS method)
Bellerive Oval, Hobart
Umpires: Phillip Gillespie and Michael Graham-Smith
Player of the match: Beau Webster (Hobart Hurricanes)

- Melbourne Stars won the toss and elected to field.
- The match was reduced to 10 overs per side due to rain.
- Melbourne Stars were set a revised target of 85 runs from 7 overs due to rain.

=== Challenger ===
Challenger
23 January 2026
19:15 (N)
Scorecard

Sydney Sixers; 8/198 (20 overs)	v	Hobart Hurricanes; 141 (17.2 overs)
Steve Smith 65 (43); Riley Meredith 3/52 (4 overs)		Ben McDermott 40 (26); Ben Dwarshuis 3/26 (3 overs)

Sydney Sixers won by 57 runs
Sydney Cricket Ground, Sydney
Umpires: Phillip Gillespie and Donovan Koch
Player of the match: Joel Davies (Sydney Sixers)

- Hobart Hurricanes won the toss and elected to field.

=== Final ===
Final
25 January 2026
19:15 (N)
Scorecard

Sydney Sixers; 132 (20 overs)	v	Perth Scorchers; 4/133 (17.3 overs)
Steve Smith 24 (13); David Payne 3/18 (4 overs)		Mitchell Marsh 44 (43); Sean Abbott 2/19 (4 overs)

Perth Scorchers won by 6 wickets
Perth Stadium, Perth
Umpires: Donovan Koch and Sam Nogajski
Player of the match: David Payne (Perth Scorchers)

- Perth Scorchers won the toss and elected to field.

== Team of the tournament ==
The official team of the tournament was announced on 22 January 2026.

#	Player	Team	Runs	Wickets
1	Finn Allen	Perth Scorchers	466	0
2	Sam Harper (wk)	Melbourne Stars	381	0
3	David Warner (c)	Sydney Thunder	433	0
4	Matt Renshaw	Brisbane Heat	324	5
5	Aaron Hardie	Perth Scorchers	339	11
6	Marcus Stoinis	Melbourne Stars	273	15
7	Jack Edwards	Sydney Sixers	133	19
8	Tom Curran	Melbourne Stars	60	16
9	Haris Rauf	Melbourne Stars	4	20
10	Lloyd Pope	Adelaide Strikers	7	15
11	Peter Siddle	Melbourne Stars	12	16
12	Liam Scott	Adelaide Strikers	310	5

== Season statistics ==
=== Team statistics ===
Highest team total
Score (overs)	Team	Opponent	Result	Venue	Date
2/258 (19.5)	Brisbane Heat	Perth Scorchers	Won	The Gabba	19 December 2025
6/257 (20.0)	Perth Scorchers	Brisbane Heat	Lost	The Gabba	19 December 2025
4/232 (20.0)	Perth Scorchers	Adelaide Strikers	Won	Adelaide Oval	11 January 2026
3/229 (20.0)	Perth Scorchers	Hobart Hurricanes	Won	Bellerive Oval	1 January 2026
7/219 (20.0)	Perth Scorchers	Melbourne Renegades	Won	Docklands Stadium	15 January 2026

Lowest team totals (losing team)
Score (overs)	Team	Opponent	Venue	Date
83 (19.3)	Adelaide Strikers	Melbourne Stars	Melbourne Cricket Ground	13 January 2026
99 (15)	Sydney Sixers	Perth Scorchers	Perth Stadium	20 January 2026
99 (16.5)	Melbourne Renegades	Adelaide Strikers	Adelaide Oval	17 January 2026
5/113 (11.0) †	Sydney Sixers	Perth Scorchers	Perth Stadium	14 December 2025
9/114 (20.0)	Brisbane Heat	Sydney Sixers	Coffs Harbour International Stadium	5 January 2026

Notes

- Only includes completed matches
- Only games with more than ten overs batted are listed above.

† Denotes a match was shortened due to weather.

=== Batting statistics ===
Most individual runs
Runs	Batsmen	Team	Inns
466	Finn Allen	Perth Scorchers	11
433	David Warner	Sydney Thunder	8
381	Sam Harper	Melbourne Stars	10
360	Mitchell Marsh	Perth Scorchers	12
339	Aaron Hardie	Perth Scorchers	12

Highest batting average
Average	Batsmen	Team	Runs	Inns	NO
86.60	David Warner	Sydney Thunder	433	8	3
59.80	Steve Smith	Sydney Sixers	299	6	1
58.00	Mac Wright	Hobart Hurricanes	58	3	2
54.60	Marcus Stoinis	Melbourne Stars	273	8	3
54.42	Sam Harper	Melbourne Stars	381	10	3
Minimum innings batted – 3

Highest individual score
High Score	Batsmen	Team	Opposition	Balls	Venue	Date
130*	David Warner	Sydney Thunder	Hobart Hurricanes	65	Sydney Showground Stadium	3 January 2026
110*	Jack Wildermuth	Brisbane Heat	Perth Scorchers	54	The Gabba	19 December 2025
110*	Sam Harper	Melbourne Stars	Sydney Sixers	60	Melbourne Cricket Ground	26 December 2025
110*	David Warner	Sydney Thunder	Sydney Sixers	65	Sydney Cricket Ground	16 January 2026
102	Tim Seifert	Melbourne Renegades	Brisbane Heat	51	Kardinia Park	15 December 2025
102	Matt Renshaw	Brisbane Heat	Perth Scorchers	56	The Gabba	19 December 2025
102	Mitchell Marsh	Perth Scorchers	Hobart Hurricanes	58	Bellerive Oval	1 January 2026

Most sixes
Sixes	Batsmen	Team	Inns
38	Finn Allen	Perth Scorchers	11
20	David Warner	Sydney Thunder	8
20	Josh Brown	Melbourne Renegades	10
20	Mitchell Marsh	Perth Scorchers	12
17	Nikhil Chaudhary	Hobart Hurricanes	10
17	Matt Renshaw	Brisbane Heat	10

=== Bowling statistics ===
Most wickets
Wickets	Player	Team	Inns
20	Haris Rauf	Melbourne Stars	11
19	Jack Edwards	Sydney Sixers	12
18	Gurinder Sandhu	Melbourne Renegades	9
16	Peter Siddle	Melbourne Stars	11
16	Tom Curran	Melbourne Stars	10
16	Ben Dwarshuis	Sydney Sixers	12

Best bowling figures
BB	Bowler	Team	Overs	Econ
5/26	Jack Edwards	Sydney Sixers	4.0	6.50
4/10	Tom Curran	Melbourne Stars	3.5	2.50
4/13	Ben Dwarshuis	Sydney Sixers	4.0	3.39
4/15	Tabraiz Shamsi	Adelaide Strikers	3.5	3.91
4/16	Jhye Richardson	Perth Scorchers	3.2	4.80

Best bowling average
Average	Bowler	Team	Wkts
10.50	Tabraiz Shamsi	Adelaide Strikers	8
13.00	Sam Elliott	Melbourne Renegades	5
13.35	Joel Davies	Sydney Sixers	14
13.54	David Payne	Perth Scorchers	11
14.93	Cooper Connolly	Perth Scorchers	15
Minimum overs bowled – 5.0

== Attendance ==
For the eight consecutive season, the Perth Scorchers topped the league in the highest average attendance, finishing with a club record of 38,947. This season was the fourth highest average attended Big Bash season ever, with a final average of 24,748, the highest since the 2017–18 season. The Grand Final in Perth had record attendance for a Big Bash final, with 55,018 spectators at Perth Stadium. A total of 1,081,484 people attended Big Bash games this season.

Match attendances in chronological order
Match	Teams	Date	Venue	Location	Attendance	Capacity % (Note: Based on general venue capacity, which will vary depending on cricket capacity.)
1	Perth Scorchers vs Sydney Sixers	14 December 2025	Perth Stadium	Perth	27,091	44%
2	Melbourne Renegades vs Brisbane Heat	15 December 2025	Kardinia Park	Geelong	10,043	25%
3	Hobart Hurricanes vs Sydney Thunder	16 December 2025	Bellerive Oval	Hobart	6,217	32%
4	Sydney Sixers vs Adelaide Strikers	17 December 2025	Sydney Cricket Ground	Sydney	20,110	42%
5	Melbourne Stars vs Hobart Hurricanes	18 December 2025	Melbourne Cricket Ground	Melbourne	19,034	19%
6	Brisbane Heat vs Perth Scorchers	19 December 2025	The Gabba	Brisbane	24,227	66%
7	Sydney Thunder vs Sydney Sixers	20 December 2025	Sydney Showground Stadium	Sydney	20,568	88%
8	Melbourne Renegades vs Hobart Hurricanes	21 December 2025	Kardinia Park	Geelong	10,267	26%
9	Sydney Thunder vs Brisbane Heat	22 December 2025	Manuka Oval	Canberra	9,004	60%
10	Adelaide Strikers vs Melbourne Stars	23 December 2025	Adelaide Oval	Adelaide	26,053	49%
11	Sydney Sixers vs Melbourne Stars	26 December 2025	Sydney Cricket Ground	Sydney	25,589	53%
12	Perth Scorchers vs Hobart Hurricanes	26 December 2025	Perth Stadium	Perth	42,620	70%
13	Brisbane Heat vs Adelaide Strikers	27 December 2025	The Gabba	Brisbane	29,210	79%
14	Melbourne Stars vs Sydney Thunder	28 December 2025	Manuka Oval	Canberra	10,255	68%
15	Hobart Hurricanes vs Melbourne Renegades	29 December 2025	Bellerive Oval	Hobart	9,195	47%
16	Sydney Thunder vs Perth Scorchers	30 December 2025	Sydney Showground Stadium	Sydney	15,020	64%
17	Brisbane Heat vs Adelaide Strikers	31 December 2025	Adelaide Oval	Adelaide	41,170	80%
18	Melbourne Renegades vs Sydney Sixers	1 January 2026	Docklands Stadium	Melbourne	26,865	48%
19	Hobart Hurricanes vs Perth Scorchers	1 January 2026	Bellerive Oval	Hobart	9,436	48%
20	Brisbane Heat vs Melbourne Stars	2 January 2026	The Gabba	Brisbane	31,972	86%
21	Sydney Thunder vs Hobart Hurricanes	3 January 2026	Sydney Showground Stadium	Sydney	14,466	62%
22	Melbourne Stars vs Melbourne Renegades	4 January 2026	Melbourne Cricket Ground	Melbourne	68,124	68%
23	Perth Scorchers vs Adelaide Strikers	4 January 2026	Perth Stadium	Perth	37,643	61%
24	Sydney Sixers vs Brisbane Heat	5 January 2026	Coffs Harbour International Stadium	Coffs Harbour	9,157	91%
25	Adelaide Strikers vs Sydney Thunder	6 January 2026	Adelaide Oval	Adelaide	20,152	38%
26	Perth Scorchers vs Melbourne Renegades	7 January 2026	Perth Stadium	Perth	29,865	50%
27	Melbourne Stars vs Sydney Sixers	8 January 2026	Melbourne Cricket Ground	Melbourne	23,764	24%
28	Hobart Hurricanes vs Adelaide Strikers	9 January 2026	Bellerive Oval	Hobart	10,318	53%
29	Brisbane Heat vs Sydney Thunder	10 January 2026	The Gabba	Brisbane	32,281	87%
30	Melbourne Renegades vs Melbourne Stars	10 January 2026	Docklands Stadium	Melbourne	42,846	91%
31	Sydney Sixers vs Hobart Hurricanes	11 January 2026	Sydney Cricket Ground	Sydney	30,090	63%
32	Adelaide Strikers vs Perth Scorchers	11 January 2026	Adelaide Oval	Adelaide	23,835	44%
33	Sydney Thunder vs Melbourne Renegades	12 January 2026	Sydney Showground Stadium	Sydney	8,124	35%
34	Melbourne Stars vs Adelaide Strikers	13 January 2026	Melbourne Cricket Ground	Melbourne	26,672	27%
35	Hobart Hurricanes vs Brisbane Heat	14 January 2026	Bellerive Oval	Hobart	10,290	51%
36	Melbourne Renegades vs Perth Scorchers	15 January 2026	Docklands Stadium	Melbourne	16,992	36%
37	Sydney Sixers vs Sydney Thunder	16 January 2026	Sydney Cricket Ground	Sydney	40,114	84%
38	Adelaide Strikers vs Melbourne Renegades	17 January 2026	Adelaide Oval	Adelaide	23,810	45%
39	Perth Scorchers vs Melbourne Stars	17 January 2026	Perth Stadium	Perth	48,608	81%
40	Brisbane Heat vs Sydney Sixers	18 January 2026	The Gabba	Brisbane	32,401	88%
Qualifier	Perth Scorchers vs Sydney Sixers	20 January 2026	Perth Stadium	Perth	31,781	52%
Knockout	Hobart Hurricanes vs Melbourne Stars	21 January 2026	Bellerive Oval	Hobart	7,440	38%
Challenger	Sydney Sixers vs Hobart Hurricanes	23 January 2026	Sydney Cricket Ground	Sydney	31,127	65%
Final	Perth Scorchers vs Sydney Sixers	25 January 2026	Perth Stadium	Perth	55,018	90%

=== Home team attendances ===
Teams are ranked in order of highest home attendance to lowest.

Rank	Team	Venue/s	Match 1	Match 2	Match 3	Match 4	Match 5	Final 1	Final 2	Average
1	Perth Scorchers	Perth Stadium	27,091	42,620	37,643	29,865	48,608	31,781	55,018	38,947
2	Brisbane Heat	The Gabba	24,277	29,210	31,972	32,281	32,401	—N/a	—N/a	30,028
3	Melbourne Stars	Melbourne Cricket Ground, Manuka Oval	19,034	10,255	68,124	23,764	26,672	—N/a	—N/a	29,570
4	Adelaide Strikers	Adelaide Oval	26,053	41,170	20,152	23,835	23,810	—N/a	—N/a	27,004
5	Sydney Sixers	Sydney Cricket Ground, Coffs Harbour International Stadium	20,110	25,589	9,157	30,090	40,114	31,127	—N/a	26,031
6	Melbourne Renegades	Docklands Stadium, Kardinia Park	10,043	10,267	26,865	42,846	16,992	—N/a	—N/a	21,403
7	Sydney Thunder	Sydney Showground Stadium, Manuka Oval	20,568	9,004	15,020	14,466	8,124	—N/a	—N/a	13,436
8	Hobart Hurricanes	Bellerive Oval	6,231	9,195	9,436	10,318	10,286	7,440	—N/a	8,818
	Average	All	19,137	22,107	27,293	25,928	25,877	31,342		24,748

- Italics* denotes a match played at a team's secondary home venue

Team	Home match attendance						
Team	No.	Total	Highest	Lowest	Average		
Team	No.	Total	Highest	Lowest	2024–25	2025–26	Change
Adelaide Strikers	5	135,020	41,170	20,152	28,593	27,004	▼1,589
Brisbane Heat	5	150,141	32,401	24,277	26,593	30,028	▲3,435
Hobart Hurricanes	6	52,906	10,318	6,231	9,459	8,818	▼641
Melbourne Renegades	5	107,013	42,846	10,043	21,528	21,403	▼125
Melbourne Stars	5	147,849	68,124	10,255	24,401	29,570	▲5,169
Perth Scorchers	7	272,626	55,018	27,091	38,507	38,947	▲440
Sydney Sixers	6	156,187	40,114	9,157	26,515	26,031	▼484
Sydney Thunder	5	67,182	20,568	8,124	12,353	13,436	▲1,083
Total	44	1,088,924	—		22,825	24,748	▲1,923

=== Attendance records ===
Highest attended match
Crowd	Home team	Away team	Venue	City	Date
68,124	Melbourne Stars	Melbourne Renegades	Melbourne Cricket Ground	Melbourne	4 January 2026
55,018	Perth Scorchers	Sydney Sixers	Perth Stadium	Perth	25 January 2026
48,608	Perth Scorchers	Melbourne Stars	Perth Stadium	Perth	17 January 2026
42,846	Melbourne Renegades	Melbourne Stars	Docklands Stadium	Melbourne	10 January 2026
42,620	Perth Scorchers	Hobart Hurricanes	Perth Stadium	Perth	26 December 2025

Lowest Attended Match
Attendance	Home Team	Away Team	Venue	City	Date
6,231	Hobart Hurricanes	Sydney Thunder	Bellerive Oval	Hobart	16 December 2025
7,440	Hobart Hurricanes	Melbourne Stars	Bellerive Oval	Hobart	21 January 2026
8,124	Sydney Thunder	Melbourne Renegades	Sydney Showground Stadium	Sydney	12 January 2026
9,004	Sydney Thunder	Brisbane Heat	Manuka Oval	Canberra	22 December 2025
9,157	Sydney Sixers	Brisbane Heat	Coffs Harbour International Stadium	Coffs Harbour	5 January 2026

=== Average attendance per state ===
State/territory	Venues	Home teams	Matches	Average attendance
Australian Capital Territory	Manuka Oval	Melbourne Stars; Sydney Thunder	2	9,630
New South Wales	Sydney Cricket Ground; Sydney Showground Stadium; Coffs Harbour International Stadium	Sydney Sixers; Sydney Thunder	10	21,436
Queensland	The Gabba	Brisbane Heat	5	30,028
South Australia	Adelaide Oval	Adelaide Strikers	5	27,004
Tasmania	Bellerive Oval	Hobart Hurricanes	6	8,818
Victoria	Melbourne Cricket Ground; Docklands Stadium; Kardinia Park	Melbourne Renegades; Melbourne Stars	9	27,179
Western Australia	Perth Stadium	Perth Scorchers	7	38,947

== See also ==
- 2025–26 Women's Big Bash League season
