= 2023–24 Big Bash League season =

13th edition of the Big Bash League

2023–24 Big Bash League
- Dates: 7 December 2023 – 24 January 2024
- Administrator: Cricket Australia
- Cricket format: Twenty20
- Tournament format(s): One and a half round-robin and playoffs
- Champions: Brisbane Heat (2nd title)
- Runners-up: Sydney Sixers
- Participants: 8
- Matches: 44
- Attendance: 881,701 (20,039 per match)
- Player of the series: Matthew Short (Adelaide Strikers)
- Most runs: Matthew Short (541) (Adelaide Strikers)
- Most wickets: Xavier Bartlett (20) (Brisbane Heat)
- Official website: cricket.com.au/big-bash

The 2023–24 Big Bash League season or BBL|13 (also known as KFC Big Bash League 2023 for sponsorship reasons) was the thirteenth edition of the Big Bash League (BBL), the professional men's Twenty20 domestic cricket competition in Australia. It started on 7 December 2023 and the final was played on 24 January 2024, with Brisbane Heat defeating Sydney Sixers to win their second BBL title.

The season was shorter than the previous season, with a total of 44 matches. This was in response to concerns that the previous 61 match season was too long.

== Draft ==
The 2023–24 season players draft was held on 3 September 2023.

Table of international draft selections
Club	Round	Pick	Player	National team	Notes
Adelaide Strikers	1	1	Rashid Khan	Afghanistan	Retention Pick, Withdrew
Adelaide Strikers	2	10	Jamie Overton	England	
Adelaide Strikers	3	23	Passed	—	
Adelaide Strikers	4	26	Adam Hose	England	
Brisbane Heat	1	7	Colin Munro	New Zealand	
Brisbane Heat	2	15	Sam Billings	England	
Brisbane Heat	3	18	Paul Walter	England	
Brisbane Heat	4	31	Passed	—	
Hobart Hurricanes	1	4	Chris Jordan	England	
Hobart Hurricanes	2	11	Sam Hain	England	
Hobart Hurricanes	3	22	Corey Anderson	New Zealand	
Hobart Hurricanes	4	27	Passed	—	
Melbourne Renegades	1	5	Quinton de Kock	South Africa	
Melbourne Renegades	2	12	Mujeeb Ur Rahman	Afghanistan	
Melbourne Renegades	3	21	Passed	—	
Melbourne Renegades	4	28	Passed	—	
Melbourne Stars	1	2	Harry Brook	England	Withdrew
Melbourne Stars	2	9	Haris Rauf	Pakistan	
Melbourne Stars	3	24	Passed	—	
Melbourne Stars	4	25	Usama Mir	Pakistan	
Perth Scorchers	1	8	Passed	—	
Perth Scorchers	2	16	Zak Crawley	England	
Perth Scorchers	3	17	Laurie Evans	England	
Perth Scorchers	4	32	Passed	—	
Sydney Sixers	1	3	Tom Curran	England	Retention pick
Sydney Sixers	2	14	James Vince	England	
Sydney Sixers	3	19	Passed	—	
Sydney Sixers	4	30	Rehan Ahmed	England	
Sydney Thunder	1	6	Alex Hales	England	
Sydney Thunder	2	13	Zaman Khan	Pakistan	
Sydney Thunder	3	20	Passed	—	
Sydney Thunder	4	29	Passed	—	

== Squads ==
Adelaide Strikers	Brisbane Heat	Hobart Hurricanes	Melbourne Renegades
Adam Hose (England); Alex Carey; Ben Manenti (Italy); Brendan Doggett; Cameron Boyce; Chris Lynn; D'Arcy Short; David Payne (England); Harry Nielsen; Henry Hunt; Henry Thornton; Jake Weatherald; James Bazley; Jamie Overton (England); Josh Kann; Matt Short (c); Thomas Kelly; Travis Head; Wes Agar	Callum Vidler; Charlie Wakim; Colin Munro (New Zealand); Jack Wildermuth; Jack Wood; Jimmy Peirson; Josh Brown; Marnus Labuschagne; Matthew Kuhnemann; Matt Renshaw; Max Bryant; Michael Neser; Mitchell Swepson; Nathan McSweeney; Paul Walter (England); Sam Billings (England); Spencer Johnson; Usman Khawaja (c); Will Prestwidge; Xavier Bartlett	Ben McDermott; Billy Stanlake; Caleb Jewell; Chris Jordan (England); Corey Anderson (United States); Iain Carlisle; Liam Guthrie; Mac Wright; Matthew Wade; Mitchell Owen; Nathan Ellis (c); Nikhil Chaudhary; Patrick Dooley; Peter Hatzoglou; Riley Meredith; Sam Hain (England); Sam Heazlett; Tim David	Aaron Finch; Adam Zampa; Fergus O'Neill; Harry Dixon; Jake Fraser-McGurk; Joe Clarke (England); Jon Wells; Jordan Cox (England); Kane Richardson; Mackenzie Harvey; Mujeeb Ur Rahman (Afghanistan); Nathan Lyon; Nic Maddinson (c); Peter Siddle; Quinton de Kock (South Africa); Ruwantha Kellepotha (Sri Lanka); Shaun Marsh; Tom Rogers; Will Sutherland
Melbourne Stars	Perth Scorchers	Sydney Sixers	Sydney Thunder
Beau Webster; Brody Couch; Campbell Kellaway; Corey Rocchiccioli; Dan Lawrence (England); Glenn Maxwell(c); Haris Rauf (Pakistan); Hilton Cartwright; Imad Wasim (Pakistan); Joe Burns; Joel Paris; Liam Dawson (England); Marcus Stoinis; Mark Steketee; Nathan Coulter-Nile; Nick Larkin; Olly Stone (England); Peter Handscomb; Sam Harper; Scott Boland; Tom Rogers; Usama Mir (Pakistan)	Aaron Hardie(c); Andrew Tye; Ashton Agar; Cameron Gannon; Cooper Connolly; Hamish McKenzie; Jason Behrendorff; Jhye Richardson; Josh Inglis; Lance Morris; Laurie Evans (England); Liam Haskett; Matthew Kelly; Mitchell Marsh; Nick Hobson; Sam Whiteman; Stephen Eskinazi (England); Zak Crawley(England); Marcus Harris; Sam Fanning	Ben Dwarshuis; Daniel Hughes; Hayden Kerr; Izharulhaq Naveed (Afghanistan); Jack Edwards; Jackson Bird; James Vince (England); Joel Davies; Jordan Silk; Josh Philippe; Kurtis Patterson; Mitchell Perry; Moises Henriques(c); Ryan Hadley; Sean Abbott; Steve O'Keefe; Steve Smith; Todd Murphy; Tom Curran (England)	Alex Hales (England); Alex Ross; Blake Nikitaras; Cameron Bancroft; Chris Green(c); Daniel Sams; David Warner; Gurinder Sandhu; Jason Sangha; Liam Doddrell; Liam Hatcher; Matt Gilkes; Nathan McAndrew; Oliver Davies; Pat Cummins; Sam Konstas; Tanveer Sangha; Tom Kohler-Cadmore (England); Will Salzmann; Zaman Khan (Pakistan)

== Venues ==
Adelaide	Albury	Brisbane	Canberra	Coffs Harbour
Adelaide Oval	Lavington Sports Ground	The Gabba	Manuka Oval	Coffs Harbour International Stadium
Capacity: 53,583	Capacity: 12,000	Capacity: 42,000	Capacity: 14,000	Capacity: 10,000
Matches: 5	Matches: 1	Matches: 5	Matches: 2	Matches: 1
Team: Adelaide Strikers	Team: Melbourne Stars	Team: Brisbane Heat	Team: Sydney Thunder	Team: Sydney Sixers
Geelong	2023–24 Big Bash League season is located in Australia			Gold Coast
GMHBA Stadium	2023–24 Big Bash League season is located in Australia			Heritage Bank Stadium
Capacity: 40,000	2023–24 Big Bash League season is located in Australia			Capacity: 21,000
Matches: 1	2023–24 Big Bash League season is located in Australia			Matches: 2
Team: Melbourne Renegades	2023–24 Big Bash League season is located in Australia			Team: Brisbane Heat
Hobart	2023–24 Big Bash League season is located in Australia			Launceston
Blundstone Arena	2023–24 Big Bash League season is located in Australia			University of Tasmania Stadium
Capacity: 19,500	2023–24 Big Bash League season is located in Australia			Capacity: 16,000
Matches: 4	2023–24 Big Bash League season is located in Australia			Matches: 1
Team: Hobart Hurricanes	2023–24 Big Bash League season is located in Australia			Team: Hobart Hurricanes
	2023–24 Big Bash League season is located in Australia			A small stand to the left and a two tier stand and scoreboard filled with people in the backdrop of an oval grass playing surface scattered with players. Spectators stand in the foreground.
Perth	Melbourne		Sydney	
Optus Stadium	Marvel Stadium	Melbourne Cricket Ground	Sydney Showground Stadium	Sydney Cricket Ground
Capacity: 60,000	Capacity: 53,359	Capacity: 100,024	Capacity: 22,000	Capacity: 48,000
Matches: 6	Matches: 4	Matches: 4	Matches: 3	Matches: 5
Team: Perth Scorchers	Team: Melbourne Renegades	Team: Melbourne Stars	Team: Sydney Thunder	Team: Sydney Sixers

== Teams and Standings ==
=== Points table ===
Pos	Team	Pld	W	L	NR	Pts	NRR	Qualification
1	Brisbane Heat (C)	10	7	1	2	16	0.972	Advanced to Qualifier
2	Sydney Sixers	10	6	2	2	14	0.339	Advanced to Qualifier
3	Perth Scorchers	10	6	3	1	13	0.725	Advanced to Knockout
4	Adelaide Strikers	10	5	4	1	11	0.331	Advanced to Knockout
5	Hobart Hurricanes	10	4	6	0	8	−0.268	
6	Melbourne Stars	10	4	6	0	8	−1.051	
7	Melbourne Renegades	10	2	6	2	6	−0.289	
8	Sydney Thunder	10	1	7	2	4	−0.652	

Source: ESPNcricinfo
(C) Champions

=== Win–loss table ===
Below is a summary of results for each team's ten regular season matches, plus finals where applicable, in chronological order. A team's opponent for any given match is listed above the margin of victory/defeat.

Team	1	2	3	4	5	6	7	8	9	10	Q	K	C	F	Pos.
Adelaide; Strikers (ADS)	BRH; N/R	SYT; 6 wickets	SYS; 1 run	MLR; 4 wickets	MLS; 7 wickets	PRS; 42 runs	PRS; 9 wickets	HBH; 5 wickets	HBH; 8 wickets	SYT; 9 wickets	→	PRS; 50 runs	BRH; 54 runs	X	4th (CF)
Brisbane; Heat (BRH)	MLS; 103 runs	ADS; N/R	SYT; 20 runs	MLR; 6 wickets	SYT; 15 runs	SYS; N/R	SYS; 3 runs (DLS)	HBH; 1 run (DLS)	PRS; 23 runs	PRS; 35 runs	SYS; 39 runs	→	ADS; 54 runs	SYS; 54 runs	1st (C)
Hobart; Hurricanes (HBH)	SYS; 6 wickets	PRS; 9 wickets	MLR; 6 wickets	MLS; 7 wickets (DLS)	SYT; 7 wickets	MLR; 6 wickets	BRH; 1 run (DLS)	ADS; 5 wickets	ADS; 8 wickets	MLS; 7 runs	X	X	X	X	5th
Melbourne; Renegades (MLR)	SYS; 8 runs	PRS; N/R	BRH; 6 wickets	HBH; 6 wickets	PRS; 13 runs	ADS; 4 wickets	MLS; 8 wickets	HBH; 6 wickets	MLS; 6 wickets	SYT; N/R	X	X	X	X	7th
Melbourne; Stars (MLS)	BRH; 103 runs	PRS; 7 wickets	SYT; 5 wickets	SYS; 4 wickets	HBH; 7 wickets (DLS)	ADS; 7 wickets	MLR; 8 wickets	SYS; 7 wickets	MLR; 6 wickets	HBH; 7 runs	X	X	X	X	6th
Perth; Scorchers (PRS)	MLR; N/R	MLS; 7 wickets	HBH; 9 wickets	MLR; 13 runs	ADS; 42 runs	ADS; 9 wickets	SYT; 7 wickets	BRH; 23 runs	BRH; 35 runs	SYS; 3 wickets	→	ADS; 50 runs	X	X	3rd (KO)
Sydney; Sixers (SYS)	MLR; 8 runs	HBH; 6 wickets	ADS; 1 run	MLS; 4 wickets	SYT; N/R	BRH; N/R	BRH; 3 runs (DLS)	MLS; 7 wickets	SYT; 19 runs	PRS; 3 wickets	BRH; 39 runs	→	→	BRH; 54 runs	2nd (RU)
Sydney; Thunder (SYT)	BRH; 20 runs	ADS; 6 wickets	MLS; 5 wickets	BRH; 15 runs	SYS; N/R	HBH; 7 wickets	PRS; 7 wickets	SYS; 19 runs	ADS; 9 wickets	MLR; N/R	X	X	X	X	8th

Team's results→	Won	Lost	N/R

=== League progression ===
Team	Group matches										Playoffs		
Team	1	2	3	4	5	6	7	8	9	10	Q/K	C	F
Adelaide Strikers	1	3	3	3	3	3	5	7	9	11	W	L	
Brisbane Heat	2	3	5	7	9	10	12	14	16	16	L	W	W
Hobart Hurricanes	0	0	2	2	4	6	6	6	6	8			
Melbourne Renegades	0	1	1	1	1	3	3	3	5	6			
Melbourne Stars	0	0	0	2	4	6	8	8	8	8			
Perth Scorchers	1	3	5	7	9	9	11	11	13	13	L		
Sydney Sixers	2	4	6	6	7	8	8	10	12	14	W		L
Sydney Thunder	0	0	2	2	3	3	3	3	3	4			

Win	Loss	No result

- Note: The total points at the end of each group match are listed.
- Note: Click on the points (group matches) or W/L (playoffs) to see the match summary.

Visitor team →	ADS	BRH	HBH	MLR	MLS	PRS	SYS	SYT
Home team ↓	ADS	BRH	HBH	MLR	MLS	PRS	SYS	SYT
Adelaide Strikers		Match abandoned	Strikers; 5 wickets		Stars; 7 wickets	Strikers; 9 wickets		Strikers; 6 wickets
Brisbane Heat			Heat; 1 run (DLS)		Heat; 103 runs	Heat; 23 runs	Match abandoned	Heat; 15 runs
Hobart Hurricanes	Strikers; 8 wickets			Hurricanes; 6 wickets	Stars; 7 wickets (DLS)		Sixers; 6 wickets	Hurricanes; 7 wickets
Melbourne Renegades	Renegades; 4 wickets	Heat; 6 wickets	Hurricanes; 6 wickets		Renegades; 6 wickets	Match abandoned		
Melbourne Stars			Hurricanes; 7 runs	Stars; 8 wickets		Scorchers; 7 wickets	Sixers; 7 wickets	Thunder; 5 wickets
Perth Scorchers	Scorchers; 42 runs	Scorchers; 35 runs	Scorchers; 9 wickets	Scorchers; 13 runs			Sixers; 3 wickets	
Sydney Sixers	Sixers; 1 run	Heat; 3 runs (DLS)		Sixers; 8 runs	Stars; 4 wickets			Sixers; 19 runs
Sydney Thunder	Strikers; 9 wickets	Heat; 20 runs		Match abandoned		Scorchers; 7 wickets	Match abandoned	

Home team won	Visitor team won

- Note: Results listed are according to the home (horizontal) and visitor (vertical) teams.
- Note: Click on a result to see a summary of the match.

== League stage ==
On 6 July, Cricket Australia confirmed the full schedule for the tournament.

Match 1
7 December 2023
18:15 AEST (N)
Scorecard

Brisbane Heat; 3/214 (20 overs)	v	Melbourne Stars; 111 (15.1 overs)
Colin Munro 99* (61); Nathan Coulter-Nile 1/35 (4 overs)		Hilton Cartwright 33 (16); Mitchell Swepson 3/23 (3.1 overs)

Brisbane Heat won by 103 runs
The Gabba, Brisbane
Attendance: 20,315
Umpires: Gerard Abood and Paul Wilson
Player of the match: Colin Munro (Brisbane Heat)

- Melbourne Stars won the toss and elected to field.

Match 2
8 December 2023
19:15 AEDT (N)
Scorecard

Sydney Sixers; 6/175 (20 overs)	v	Melbourne Renegades; 7/167 (20 overs)
Steve Smith 61 (42); Will Sutherland 2/21 (4 overs)		Will Sutherland 51* (30); Ben Dwarshuis 3/36 (4 overs)

Sydney Sixers won by 8 runs
Sydney Cricket Ground, Sydney
Attendance: 13,089
Umpires: Bruce Oxenford and Michael Graham-Smith
Player of the match: Steve Smith (Sydney Sixers)

- Melbourne Renegades won the toss and elected to field.

Match 3
9 December 2023
18:45 ACDT (N)
Scorecard

Adelaide Strikers	v	Brisbane Heat

Match abandoned without a ball bowled
Adelaide Oval, Adelaide
Attendance: –
Umpires: Shawn Craig and Nathan Johnstone

- No toss.
- No play was possible due to rain.

Match 4
10 December 2023
19:15 AEDT (N)
Scorecard

Perth Scorchers; 2/30 (6.5 overs)	v	Melbourne Renegades
Aaron Hardie 20* (23); Tom Rogers 1/7 (2 overs)

No result
GMHBA Stadium, Geelong
Attendance: 6,601
Umpires: Simon Lightbody and Ben Treloar

- Melbourne Renegades won the toss and elected to field.
- Match abandoned due to unsafe pitch.
- Hamish McKenzie (Perth Scorchers) made his T20 debut.

Match 5
11 December 2023
19:15 AEDT (N)
Scorecard

Hobart Hurricanes; 8/135 (20 overs)	v	Sydney Sixers; 4/139 (19.2 overs)
Caleb Jewell 42 (24); Tom Curran 3/19 (4 overs)		Daniel Hughes 60* (50); Corey Anderson 2/10 (3.3 overs)

Sydney Sixers won by 6 wickets
University of Tasmania Stadium, Launceston
Attendance: 6,289
Umpires: Greg Davidson and Nathan Johnstone
Player of the match: Daniel Hughes (Sydney Sixers)

- Hobart Hurricanes won the toss and elected to bat.

Match 6
12 December 2023
19:15 AEDT (N)
Scorecard

Brisbane Heat; 7/151 (20 overs)	v	Sydney Thunder; 131 (19 overs)
Colin Munro 46 (33); Tanveer Sangha 3/21 (4 overs)		Oliver Davies 35 (30); Xavier Bartlett 3/35 (4 overs)

Brisbane Heat won by 20 runs
Manuka Oval, Canberra
Attendance: 7,175
Umpires: Gerard Abood and Bruce Oxenford
Player of the match: Mitchell Swepson (Brisbane Heat)

- Sydney Thunder won the toss and elected to field.

Match 7
13 December 2023
19:15 AEDT (N)
Scorecard

Melbourne Stars; 101 (19.1 overs)	v	Perth Scorchers; 3/102 (13.5 overs)
Hilton Cartwright 24 (18); Jason Behrendorff 3/28 (4 overs)		Stephen Eskinazi 25 (25); Joel Paris 1/17 (2 overs)

Perth Scorchers won by 7 wickets
Melbourne Cricket Ground, Melbourne
Attendance: 13,522
Umpires: Shawn Craig and Phillip Gillespie
Player of the match: Hamish McKenzie (Perth Scorchers)

- Perth Scorchers won the toss and elected to field.

Match 8
19 December 2023
18:45 ACDT (N)
Scorecard

Sydney Thunder; 7/200 (20 overs)	v	Adelaide Strikers; 4/205 (19.4 overs)
Cameron Bancroft 74 (54); Jamie Overton 2/29 (4 overs)		Matthew Short 82 (41); Tanveer Sangha 1/33 (4 overs)

Adelaide Strikers won by 6 wickets
Adelaide Oval, Adelaide
Attendance: 20,748
Umpires: Greg Davidson and Phillip Gillespie
Player of the match: Matthew Short (Adelaide Strikers)

- Sydney Thunder won the toss and elected to bat.

Match 9
20 December 2023
16:15 AWST (D/N)
Scorecard

Hobart Hurricanes; 8/172 (20 overs)	v	Perth Scorchers; 1/173 (16.1 overs)
Chris Jordan 59 (20); Jason Behrendorff 4/25 (4 overs)		Aaron Hardie 85* (45); Chris Jordan 1/25 (3 overs)

Perth Scorchers won by 9 wickets
Optus Stadium, Perth
Attendance: 28,494
Umpires: Michael Graham-Smith and Paul Wilson
Player of the match: Jason Behrendorff (Perth Scorchers)

- Hobart Hurricanes won the toss and elected to bat.

Match 10
21 December 2023
19:15 AEDT (N)
Scorecard

Melbourne Renegades; 8/162 (20 overs)	v	Brisbane Heat; 4/163 (18.1 overs)
Jake Fraser-McGurk 55 (23); Paul Walter 3/27 (4 overs)		Matt Renshaw 49* (37); Mujeeb Ur Rahman 2/27 (4 overs)

Brisbane Heat won by 6 wickets
Marvel Stadium, Melbourne
Attendance: 14,893
Umpires: Phillip Gillespie and Claire Polosak
Player of the match: Paul Walter (Brisbane Heat)

- Brisbane Heat won the toss and elected to field.

Match 11
22 December 2023
19:15 AEDT (N)
Scorecard

Sydney Sixers; 7/155 (20 overs)	v	Adelaide Strikers; 6/154 (20 overs)
Jordan Silk 66* (45); Jamie Overton 3/23 (4 overs)		Matthew Short 55 (48); Moises Henriques 2/11 (2 overs)

Sydney Sixers won by 1 run
Sydney Cricket Ground, Sydney
Attendance: 18,368
Umpires: Donovan Koch and Gerard Abood
Player of the match: Jordan Silk (Sydney Sixers)

- Adelaide Strikers won the toss and elected to field.

Match 12
23 December 2023
15:30 AEDT (D/N)
Scorecard

Melbourne Stars; 172 (20 overs)	v	Sydney Thunder; 5/176 (18.2 overs)
Beau Webster 59 (44); Daniel Sams 4/33 (4 overs)		Alex Hales 40 (26); Beau Webster 4/29 (4 overs)

Sydney Thunder won by 5 wickets
Lavington Sports Ground, Albury
Attendance: 10,113
Umpires: Greg Davidson and Bruce Oxenford
Player of the match: Zaman Khan (Sydney Thunder)

- Melbourne Stars won the toss and elected to bat.

Match 13
23 December 2023
19:15 AEDT (N)
Scorecard

Melbourne Renegades; 5/183 (20 overs)	v	Hobart Hurricanes; 4/187 (19 overs)
Jonathan Wells 40* (24); Nathan Ellis 2/32 (4 overs); Patrick Dooley 2/32 (4 overs)		Matthew Wade 82 (50); Tom Rogers 2/32 (4 overs)

Hobart Hurricanes won by 6 wickets
Blundstone Arena, Hobart
Attendance: 8,186
Umpires: Sam Nogajski and Simon Lightbody
Player of the match: Matthew Wade (Hobart Hurricanes)

- Hobart Hurricanes won the toss and elected to field.

Match 14
26 December 2023
18:05 AEDT (N)
Scorecard

Sydney Sixers; 8/154 (20 overs)	v	Melbourne Stars; 6/155 (19.3 overs)
James Vince 83 (55); Usama Mir 3/19 (4 overs)		Hilton Cartwright 47* (30); Sean Abbott 2/32 (4 overs)

Melbourne Stars won by 4 wickets
Sydney Cricket Ground, Sydney
Attendance: 16,269
Umpires: Gerard Abood and Paul Wilson
Player of the match: Hilton Cartwright (Melbourne Stars)

- Melbourne Stars won the toss and elected to field.

Match 15
26 December 2023
18:15 AWST (N)
Scorecard

Perth Scorchers; 162 (19.4 overs)	v	Melbourne Renegades; 8/149 (20 overs)
Josh Inglis 64 (44); Tom Rogers 3/18 (4 overs)		Shaun Marsh 59 (36); Andrew Tye 2/21 (4 overs)

Perth Scorchers won by 13 runs
Optus Stadium, Perth
Attendance: 42,226
Umpires: Shawn Craig and Greg Davidson
Player of the match: Josh Inglis (Perth Scorchers)

- Melbourne Renegades won the toss and elected to field.

Match 16
27 December 2023
18:15 AEST (N)
Scorecard

Brisbane Heat; 172 (19.4 overs)	v	Sydney Thunder; 9/157 (20 overs)
Nathan McSweeney 73 (52); Daniel Sams 5/30 (4 overs)		Cameron Bancroft 46 (39); Xavier Bartlett 3/29 (4 overs)

Brisbane Heat won by 15 runs
The Gabba, Brisbane
Attendance: 29,155
Umpires: Donovan Koch and Simon Lightbody
Player of the match: Nathan McSweeney (Brisbane Heat)

- Brisbane Heat won the toss and elected to bat.

Match 17
28 December 2023
19:15 AEDT (N)
Scorecard

Hobart Hurricanes; 155 (19.4 overs)	v	Melbourne Stars; 3/67 (6.3 overs)
Caleb Jewell 45 (37); Haris Rauf 3/24 (3 overs)		Glenn Maxwell 35* (18); Riley Meredith 2/15 (2 overs)

Melbourne Stars won by 7 wickets (DLS method)
Blundstone Arena, Hobart
Attendance: 7,455
Umpires: Sam Nogajski and Ben Treloar
Player of the match: Glenn Maxwell (Melbourne Stars)

- Melbourne Stars won the toss and elected to field.
- Melbourne Stars were set a revised target of 67 runs from 7 overs due to rain.

Match 18
29 December 2023
19:15 AEDT (N)
Scorecard

Adelaide Strikers; 6/177 (20 overs)	v	Melbourne Renegades; 6/178 (18.4 overs)
Chris Lynn 56 (34); Mujeeb Ur Rahman 3/20 (4 overs)		Jake Fraser-McGurk 70 (37); David Payne 3/37 (3.4 overs)

Melbourne Renegades won by 4 wickets
Marvel Stadium, Melbourne
Attendance: 15,449
Umpires: Gerard Abood and Bruce Oxenford
Player of the match: Jake Fraser-McGurk (Melbourne Renegades)

- Adelaide Strikers won the toss and elected to bat.

Match 19
30 December 2023
19:15 AEDT (N)
Scorecard

Sydney Thunder; 7/151 (20 overs)	v	Sydney Sixers; 1/34 (4 overs)
Alex Ross 44 (39); Jack Edwards 3/24 (4 overs)		Kurtis Patterson 13* (9); Chris Green 1/12 (1 over)

No result
Sydney Showground Stadium, Sydney
Attendance: 22,102
Umpires: Greg Davidson and Sam Nogajski

- Sydney Thunder won the toss and elected to bat.
- No further play was possible due to rain.

Match 20
31 December 2023
18:45 ACDT (N)
Scorecard

Adelaide Strikers; 4/205 (20 overs)	v	Melbourne Stars; 3/211 (19 overs)
Chris Lynn 83* (42); Glenn Maxwell 2/21 (3 overs)		Beau Webster 66* (48); Cameron Boyce 1/15 (4 overs)

Melbourne Stars won by 7 wickets
Adelaide Oval, Adelaide
Attendance: 42,504
Umpires: Shawn Craig and Michael Graham-Smith
Player of the match: Marcus Stoinis (Melbourne Stars)

- Melbourne Stars won the toss and elected to field.

Match 21
1 January 2024
16:00 AEDT (D/N)
Scorecard

Sydney Thunder; 8/150 (20 overs)	v	Hobart Hurricanes; 3/151 (18.1 overs)
Chris Green 33* (17); Chris Jordan 2/20 (4 overs)		Ben McDermott 53* (34); Nathan McAndrew 1/21 (3.1 overs)

Hobart Hurricanes won by 7 wickets
Blundstone Arena, Hobart
Attendance: 9,130
Umpires: Bruce Oxenford and Nathan Johnstone
Player of the match: Chris Jordan (Hobart Hurricanes)

- Hobart Hurricanes won the toss and elected to field.

Match 22
1 January 2024
18:15 AEST (N)
Scorecard

Brisbane Heat	v	Sydney Sixers

Match abandoned without a ball bowled
The Gabba, Brisbane
Attendance: –
Umpires: Stephen Dionysius and Ben Treloar

- No toss.
- No play was possible due to rain.

Match 23
2 January 2024
19:15 AEDT (N)
Scorecard

Melbourne Renegades; 7/97 (14 overs)	v	Melbourne Stars; 2/98 (12 overs)
Quinton de Kock 23 (16); Dan Lawrence 2/8 (2 overs)		Thomas Rogers 42* (34); Tom Rogers 1/21 (3 overs)

Melbourne Stars won by 8 wickets
Melbourne Cricket Ground, Melbourne
Attendance: 27,024
Umpires: Michael Graham-Smith and Sam Nogajski
Player of the match: Glenn Maxwell (Melbourne Stars)

- Melbourne Stars won the toss and elected to field.
- Match reduced to 14 overs per side due to rain.

Match 24
3 January 2024
18:05 AEDT (N)
Scorecard

Sydney Sixers; 8/141 (20 overs)	v	Brisbane Heat; 4/104 (14.3 overs)
Josh Philippe 41 (36); Matthew Kuhnemann 2/19 (4 overs)		Josh Brown 43 (31); Ben Dwarshuis 1/7 (2 overs)

Brisbane Heat won by 3 runs (DLS method)
Coffs Harbour International Stadium, Coffs Harbour
Attendance: 10,372
Umpires: Simon Lightbody and Paul Wilson
Player of the match: Paul Walter (Brisbane Heat)

- Brisbane Heat won the toss and elected to field.
- No further play was possible due to rain.

Match 25
3 January 2024
18:15 AWST (N)
Scorecard

Perth Scorchers; 4/211 (20 overs)	v	Adelaide Strikers; 169 (19.2 overs)
Laurie Evans 85* (28); Henry Thornton 2/31 (4 overs)		Matthew Short 74 (44); Lance Morris 5/24 (4 overs)

Perth Scorchers won by 42 runs
Optus Stadium, Perth
Attendance: 41,576
Umpires: Gerard Abood and Ben Treloar
Player of the match: Laurie Evans (Perth Scorchers)

- Adelaide Strikers won the toss and elected to field.

Match 26
4 January 2024
19:15 AEDT (N)
Scorecard

Melbourne Renegades; 4/147 (20 overs)	v	Hobart Hurricanes; 4/148 (18.4 overs)
Jordan Cox 47 (36); Tim David 1/0 (1 over)		Sam Hain 51 (36); Fergus O'Neill 2/25 (4 overs)

Hobart Hurricanes won by 6 wickets
Marvel Stadium, Melbourne
Attendance: 13,107
Umpires: Bruce Oxenford and Eloise Sheridan
Player of the match: Sam Hain (Hobart Hurricanes)

- Hobart Hurricanes won the toss and elected to field.

Match 27
5 January 2024
18:45 ACDT (N)
Scorecard

Perth Scorchers; 7/153 (20 overs)	v	Adelaide Strikers; 1/154 (16.1 overs)
Josh Inglis 39 (25); David Payne 2/22 (3 overs)		Matthew Short 76* (51); Lance Morris 1/25 (3 overs)

Adelaide Strikers won by 9 wickets
Adelaide Oval, Adelaide
Attendance: 26,186
Umpires: Andrew Crozier and Michael Graham-Smith
Player of the match: Matthew Short (Adelaide strikers)

- Adelaide Strikers won the toss and elected to field.

Match 28
6 January 2024
19:15 AEDT (N)
Scorecard

Melbourne Stars; 4/156 (20 overs)	v	Sydney Sixers; 3/160 (18.1 overs)
Dan Lawrence 36 (34); Todd Murphy 2/15 (4 overs)		James Vince 79 (57); Scott Boland 2/38 (4 overs)

Sydney Sixers won by 7 wickets
Melbourne Cricket Ground, Melbourne
Attendance: 30,011
Umpires: Ben Treloar and Greg Davidson
Player of the match: James Vince (Sydney Sixers)

- Sydney Sixers won the toss and elected to field.

Match 29
7 January 2024
18:15 AEST (N)
Scorecard

Brisbane Heat; 7/132 (20 overs)	v	Hobart Hurricanes; 9/116 (16 overs)
Colin Munro 56 (47); Chris Jordan 3/19 (4 overs)		Nikhil Chaudhary 55 (38); Xavier Bartlett 3/30 (4 overs)

Brisbane Heat won by 1 run (DLS method)
The Gabba, Brisbane
Attendance: 27,124
Umpires: Shawn Craig and Sam Nogajski
Player of the match: Xavier Bartlett (Brisbane Heat)

- Hobart Hurricanes won the toss and elected to field.
- Hobart Hurricanes were set a revised target of 118 runs from 16 overs due to rain.

Match 30
8 January 2024
19:15 AEDT (N)
Scorecard

Sydney Thunder; 8/137 (20 overs)	v	Perth Scorchers; 3/140 (19.1 overs)
Alex Hales 72 (55); Cooper Connolly 3/25 (4 overs)		Zak Crawley 58 (56); Nathan McAndrew 2/27 (4 overs)

Perth Scorchers won by 7 wickets
Sydney Showground Stadium, Sydney
Attendance: 8,672
Umpires: Troy Penman and Ben Treloar
Player of the match: Ashton Agar (Perth Scorchers)

- Perth Scorchers won the toss and elected to field.

Match 31
9 January 2024
19:10 ACDT (N)
Scorecard

Hobart Hurricanes; 7/165 (20 overs)	v	Adelaide Strikers; 5/168 (19.2 overs)
Ben McDermott 95* (61); Jamie Overton 3/23 (4 overs)		Matthew Short 45 (32); Nathan Ellis 2/44 (4 overs)

Adelaide Strikers won by 5 wickets
Adelaide Oval, Adelaide
Attendance: 25,024
Umpires: Sam Nogajski and Nathan Johnstone
Player of the match: Cameron Boyce (Adelaide Strikers)

- Adelaide Strikers won the toss and elected to field.

Match 32
10 January 2024
18:40 AEST (N)
Scorecard

Brisbane Heat; 6/191 (20 overs)	v	Perth Scorchers; 9/168 (20 overs)
Michael Neser 64* (30); Ashton Agar 2/29 (4 overs)		Laurie Evans 51 (29); Spencer Johnson 2/23 (4 overs)

Brisbane Heat won by 23 runs
The Gabba, Brisbane
Attendance: 26,465
Umpires: Greg Davidson and David Taylor
Player of the match: Michael Neser (Brisbane Heat)

- Brisbane Heat won the toss and elected to bat.

Match 33
11 January 2024
19:15 AEDT (N)
Scorecard

Hobart Hurricanes; 6/167 (20 overs)	v	Adelaide Strikers; 2/169 (15.5 overs)
Mac Wright 37 (27); Cameron Boyce 2/17 (4 overs)		Jake Weatherald 80* (32); Nikhil Chaudhary 1/18 (3 overs)

Adelaide Strikers won by 8 wickets
Blundstone Arena, Hobart
Attendance: 8,852
Umpires: Sam Nogajski and Sharad Patel
Player of the match: Jake Weatherald (Adelaide Strikers)

- Adelaide Strikers won the toss and elected to field.

Match 34
12 January 2024
19:15 AEDT (N)
Scorecard

Sydney Sixers; 7/151 (20 overs)	v	Sydney Thunder; 132 (19.5 overs)
Josh Philippe 47 (35); Nathan McAndrew 2/17 (3 overs)		David Warner 37 (39); Steve O'Keefe 3/13 (4 overs)

Sydney Sixers won by 19 runs
Sydney Cricket Ground, Sydney
Attendance: 41,027
Umpires: Shawn Craig and Simon Lightbody
Player of the match: Steve O'Keefe (Sydney Sixers)

- Sydney Thunder won the toss and elected to field.

Match 35
13 January 2024
13:15 AWST
Scorecard

Perth Scorchers; 6/163 (20 overs)	v	Brisbane Heat; 128 (19.5 overs)
Nick Hobson 48* (30); Michael Neser 2/21 (3 overs)		Jimmy Peirson 42 (41); Andrew Tye 4/14 (3.5 overs)

Perth Scorchers won by 35 runs
Optus Stadium, Perth
Attendance: 32,583
Umpires: Bruce Oxenford and Nathan Johnstone
Player of the match: Nick Hobson (Perth Scorchers)

- Perth Scorchers won the toss and elected to bat.

Match 36
13 January 2024
19:30 AEDT (N)
Scorecard

Melbourne Stars; 8/137 (20 overs)	v	Melbourne Renegades; 4/139 (17.2 overs)
Hilton Cartwright 38 (30); Kane Richardson 2/17 (4 overs)		Shaun Marsh 64* (49); Nathan Coulter-Nile 2/25 (4 overs)

Melbourne Renegades won by 6 wickets
Marvel Stadium, Melbourne
Attendance: 41,205
Umpires: Greg Davidson and Gerard Abood
Player of the match: Shaun Marsh (Melbourne Renegades)

- Melbourne Renegades won the toss and elected to field.

Match 37
14 January 2024
19:15 AEDT (N)
Scorecard

Sydney Thunder; 140 (19.2 overs)	v	Adelaide Strikers; 1/141 (16.1 overs)
Alex Hales 43 (32); Lloyd Pope 4/22 (3 overs)		Matthew Short 74* (49); Tanveer Sangha 1/27 (4 overs)

Adelaide Strikers won by 9 wickets
Manuka Oval, Canberra
Attendance: 11,173
Umpires: Simon Lightbody and Paul Wilson
Player of the match: Lloyd Pope (Adelaide Strikers)

- Sydney Thunder won the toss and elected to bat.

Match 38
15 January 2024
19:15 AEDT (N)
Scorecard

Hobart Hurricanes; 8/187 (20 overs)	v	Melbourne Stars; 4/180 (20 overs)
Matthew Wade 63 (41); Dan Lawrence 4/35 (4 overs)		Beau Webster 55* (43); Nathan Ellis 2/29 (4 overs)

Hobart Hurricanes won by 7 runs
Melbourne Cricket Ground, Melbourne
Attendance: 22,782
Umpires: Shawn Craig and Ben Treloar
Player of the match: Nathan Ellis (Hobart Hurricanes)

- Melbourne Stars won the toss and elected to field.

Match 39
16 January 2024
16:40 AWST (D/N)
Scorecard

Perth Scorchers; 4/197 (20 overs)	v	Sydney Sixers; 7/201 (20 overs)
Laurie Evans 72 (34); Ben Dwarshuis 2/23 (4 overs)		Daniel Hughes 74 (43); Jason Behrendorff 3/35 (4 overs)

Sydney Sixers won by 3 wickets
Optus Stadium, Perth
Attendance: 33,412
Umpires: Nathan Johnstone and Sam Nogajski
Player of the match: Daniel Hughes (Sydney Sixers)

- Perth Scorchers won the toss and elected to bat.

Match 40
17 January 2024
19:15 AEDT (N)
Scorecard

Sydney Thunder	v	Melbourne Renegades

Match abandoned without a ball bowled
Sydney Showground Stadium, Sydney
Attendance: –
Umpires: Michael Graham-Smith and Ben Treloar

- No toss.
- No play was possible due to rain.

== Play-offs ==
Qualifier
19 January 2024 — Carrara
1	Brisbane Heat	113 (17.5 overs)
2	Sydney Sixers	8/152 (20 overs)
Knockout
20 January 2024 — Perth
3	Perth Scorchers	105 (16.2 overs)
4	Adelaide Strikers	7/155 (20 overs)

Challenger
22 January 2024 — Carrara
1	Brisbane Heat	7/214 (20 overs)
4	Adelaide Strikers	160 (19.5 overs)

Final
24 January 2024 — Sydney
2	Sydney Sixers	112 (17.3 overs)
1	Brisbane Heat	8/166 (20 overs)

=== Qualifier ===
19 January 2024
18:40 AEST (N)
Scorecard

Sydney Sixers; 8/152 (20 overs)	v	Brisbane Heat; 113 (17.5 overs)
Moises Henriques 59 (50); Michael Neser 3/27 (4 overs)		Jimmy Peirson 26 (25); Ben Dwarshuis 5/21 (3.5 overs)

Sydney Sixers won by 39 runs
Heritage Bank Stadium, Carrara
Attendance: 20,191
Umpires: Michael Graham-Smith and Sam Nogajski
Player of the match: Ben Dwarshuis (Sydney Sixers)

- Brisbane Heat won the toss and elected to field.

=== Knockout ===
20 January 2024
16:40 AWST (N)
Scorecard

Adelaide Strikers; 7/155 (20 overs)	v	Perth Scorchers; 105 (16.2 overs)
Jake Weatherald 56 (32); Cooper Connolly 2/17 (3 overs)		Sam Fanning 31 (20); Lloyd Pope 4/24 (4 overs)

Adelaide Strikers won by 50 runs
Optus Stadium, Perth
Attendance: 33,117
Umpires: Gerard Abood and Shawn Craig
Player of the match: Lloyd Pope (Adelaide Strikers)

- Perth Scorchers won the toss and elected to field.

=== Challenger ===
22 January 2024
18:40 AEST (N)
Scorecard

Brisbane Heat; 7/214 (20 overs)	v	Adelaide Strikers; 160 (19.5 overs)
Josh Brown 140 (57); David Payne 2/17 (3 overs)		Harry Nielsen 50 (33); Nathan McSweeney 3/3 (0.5 over)

Brisbane Heat won by 54 runs
Heritage Bank Stadium, Carrara
Attendance: 6,562
Umpires: Gerard Abood and Sam Nogajski
Player of the match: Josh Brown (Brisbane Heat)

- Brisbane Heat won the toss and elected to bat.
- Brown's 140 was the third highest innings in the history of the BBL to date, and the highest in a final.

=== Final ===
24 January 2024
19:15 AEDT (N)
Scorecard

Brisbane Heat; 8/166 (20 overs)	v	Sydney Sixers; 112 (17.3 overs)
Josh Brown 53 (38); Sean Abbott 4/32 (4 overs)		Moises Henriques 25 (27); Spencer Johnson 4/26 (4 overs)

Brisbane Heat won by 54 runs
Sydney Cricket Ground, Sydney
Attendance: 43,153
Umpires: Gerard Abood and Sam Nogajski
Player of the match: Spencer Johnson (Brisbane Heat)

- Sydney Sixers won the toss and elected to field.
- Johnson's bowling figures were the best to date in a BBL Grand Final

== Season statistics ==
Highest team totals
Team	Score (Overs)	Opponent	Result	Venue
Brisbane Heat	3/214 (20 overs)	Melbourne Stars	Won	The Gabba
Brisbane Heat	7/214 (20 overs)	Adelaide Strikers	Won	Carrara Stadium
Melbourne Stars	3/211 (19 overs)	Adelaide Strikers	Won	Adelaide Oval
Perth Scorchers	4/211 (20 overs)	Adelaide Strikers	Won	Perth Stadium
Adelaide Strikers	4/205 (19.4 overs)	Sydney Thunder	Won	Adelaide Oval

Last updated: 24 January 2024

Most individual runs
Player	Team	Runs
Matt Short	Adelaide Strikers	541
Josh Brown	Brisbane Heat	366
Aaron Hardie	Perth Scorchers	334
Chris Lynn	Adelaide Strikers	304
Laurie Evans	Perth Scorchers	292

- Source: CricInfo

Highest individual score
Player	Team	Opposition	Runs
Josh Brown	Brisbane Heat	Adelaide Strikers	140
Colin Munro	Brisbane Heat	Melbourne Stars	99 not out
Ben McDermott	Hobart Hurricanes	Adelaide Strikers	95
Laurie Evans	Perth Scorchers	Adelaide Strikers	85 not out
Aaron Hardie	Perth Scorchers	Hobart Hurricanes	85 not out

Most wickets
Player	Team	Wkts
Xavier Bartlett	Brisbane Heat	20
Spencer Johnson	Brisbane Heat	19
Ben Dwarshuis	Sydney Sixers	17
Paul Walter	Brisbane Heat	17
Jason Behrendorff	Perth Scorchers	16

Best bowling
Player	Team	Opposition	Figures
Ben Dwarshuis	Sydney Sixers	Brisbane Heat	5/21
Lance Morris	Perth Scorchers	Adelaide Strikers	5/24
Daniel Sams	Sydney Thunder	Brisbane Heat	5/30
Andrew Tye	Perth Scorchers	Brisbane Heat	4/14
Lloyd Pope	Adelaide Strikers	Sydney Thunder	4/22

== Attendances ==
Match attendances in chronological order
Match	Teams	Date	Venue	Location	Attendance	Capacity % (Note: Based on general venue capacity, which will vary depending on cricket capacity.)
1	Brisbane Heat vs Melbourne Stars	7 December 2023	The Gabba	Brisbane	20,315	48%
2	Sydney Sixers vs Melbourne Renegades	8 December 2023	Sydney Cricket Ground	Sydney	13,089	27%
3	Adelaide Strikers vs Brisbane Heat	9 December 2023	Adelaide Oval	Adelaide	– (Note: No crowd recorded as match was abandoned without a ball bowled)	N/A
4	Perth Scorchers vs Melbourne Renegades	10 December 2023	Kardinia Park	Geelong	6,601	18%
5	Hobart Hurricanes vs Sydney Sixers	11 December 2023	York Park	Launceston	6,289	33%
6	Brisbane Heat vs Sydney Thunder	12 December 2023	Manuka Oval	Canberra	7,175	48%
7	Melbourne Stars vs Perth Scorchers	13 December 2023	Melbourne Cricket Ground	Melbourne	13,522	14%
8	Adelaide Strikers vs Sydney Thunder	19 December 2023	Adelaide Oval	Adelaide	20,748	39%
9	Perth Scorchers vs Hobart Hurricanes	20 December 2023	Perth Stadium	Perth	28,494	47%
10	Melbourne Renegades vs Brisbane Heat	21 December 2023	Docklands Stadium	Melbourne	14,893	26%
11	Sydney Sixers vs Adelaide Strikers	22 December 2023	Sydney Cricket Ground	Sydney	18,368	38%
12	Melbourne Stars vs Sydney Thunder	23 December 2023	Lavington Sports Ground	Albury	10,113	84%
13	Hobart Hurricanes vs Melbourne Renegades	23 December 2023	Bellerive Oval	Hobart	8,186	42%
14	Sydney Sixers vs Melbourne Stars	26 December 2023	Sydney Cricket Ground	Sydney	16,269	34%
15	Perth Scorchers vs Melbourne Renegades	26 December 2023	Perth Stadium	Perth	42,226	69%
16	Brisbane Heat vs Sydney Thunder	27 December 2023	The Gabba	Brisbane	29,155	81%
17	Hobart Hurricanes vs Melbourne Stars	28 December 2023	Bellerive Oval	Hobart	7,455	37%
18	Melbourne Renegades vs Adelaide Strikers	29 December 2023	Docklands Stadium	Melbourne	15,449	29%
19	Sydney Thunder vs Sydney Sixers	30 December 2023	Sydney Showground Stadium	Sydney	22,102	94%
20	Adelaide Strikers vs Melbourne Stars	31 December 2023	Adelaide Oval	Adelaide	42,504	79%
21	Hobart Hurricanes vs Sydney Thunder	1 January 2024	Bellerive Oval	Hobart	9,130	47%
22	Brisbane Heat vs Sydney Sixers	1 January 2024	The Gabba	Brisbane	–	N/A
23	Melbourne Stars vs Melbourne Renegades	2 January 2024	Melbourne Cricket Ground	Melbourne	27,024	27%
24	Sydney Sixers vs Brisbane Heat	3 January 2024	Coffs Harbour International Stadium	Coffs Harbour	10,372	100%
25	Perth Scorchers vs Adelaide Strikers	3 January 2024	Perth Stadium	Perth	41,576	68%
26	Melbourne Renegades vs Hobart Hurricanes	4 January 2024	Docklands Stadium	Melbourne	13,107	23%
27	Adelaide Strikers vs Perth Scorchers	5 January 2024	Adelaide Oval	Adelaide	26,189	49%
28	Melbourne Stars vs Sydney Sixers	6 January 2024	Melbourne Cricket Ground	Melbourne	30,011	30%
29	Brisbane Heat vs Hobart Hurricanes	7 January 2024	The Gabba	Brisbane	27,124	65%
30	Sydney Thunder vs Perth Scorchers	8 January 2024	Sydney Showground Stadium	Sydney	8,672	37%
31	Adelaide Strikers vs Hobart Hurricanes	9 January 2024	Adelaide Oval	Adelaide	25,024	47%
32	Brisbane Heat vs Perth Scorchers	10 January 2024	The Gabba	Brisbane	26,465	74%
33	Hobart Hurricanes vs Adelaide Strikers	11 January 2024	Bellerive Oval	Hobart	8,852	45%
34	Sydney Sixers vs Sydney Thunder	12 January 2024	Sydney Cricket Ground	Sydney	41,027	85%
35	Perth Scorchers vs Brisbane Heat	13 January 2024	Perth Stadium	Perth	32,583	53%
36	Melbourne Renegades vs Melbourne Stars	13 January 2024	Docklands Stadium	Melbourne	41,205	72%
37	Sydney Thunder vs Adelaide Strikers	14 January 2024	Manuka Oval	Canberra	11,173	74%
38	Melbourne Stars vs Hobart Hurricanes	15 January 2024	Melbourne Cricket Ground	Melbourne	22,782	23%
39	Perth Scorchers vs Sydney Sixers	16 January 2024	Perth Stadium	Perth	33,412	56%
40	Sydney Thunder vs Melbourne Renegades	17 January 2024	Sydney Showground Stadium	Sydney	–	N/A
Qualifier	Brisbane Heat vs Sydney Sixers	19 January 2024	Heritage Bank Stadium	Carrara	20,191	90%
Knockout	Perth Scorchers vs Adelaide Strikers	20 January 2024	Perth Stadium	Perth	33,117	54%
Challenger	Brisbane Heat vs Adelaide Strikers	22 January 2024	Heritage Bank Stadium	Carrara	6,562	29%
Final	Sydney Sixers vs Brisbane Heat	24 January 2024	Sydney Cricket Ground	Sydney	43,153	90%
Total					881,704	—
Average					21,505	—

As of 24 January 2024

== See also ==
- 2023–24 Women's Big Bash League season
