= 2025–26 Melbourne Renegades season =

Australian cricket team season

Melbourne Renegades
2025–26 season
- Coach: Cameron White
- Captain(s): Will Sutherland
- Home ground: Marvel Stadium; GMHBA Stadium
- BBL season: 7th
- BBL finals: Did not qualify
- Leading Run Scorer: Josh Brown (311)
- Leading Wicket Taker: Gurinder Sandhu (18)
- Highest home attendance: 42,846 vs. Melbourne Stars at Marvel Stadium (10 January 2026)
- Lowest home attendance: 10,043 vs. Brisbane Heat at GMHBA Stadium (15 December 2025)
- Average home attendance: 21,403
- Club membership: 12,528

The 2025–26 Melbourne Renegades season was the fifteenth in the club's history. Coached by Cameron White and captained by Will Sutherland they competed in the Big Bash League's 2025–26 season.

== Squad information ==
The squad of the Melbourne Renegades for the 2025–26 Big Bash League season as of 16 January 2026.

- Players with international caps are listed in **bold**.

No.	Name	Nat.	Date of birth	Batting style	Bowling style	Notes
Batters
6	Josh Brown	Australia	26 December 1993 (age 32)	Right-handed	Right-arm off spin	
22	Harry Dixon	Australia	16 February 2005 (age 21)	Left-handed	Right-arm off spin	
23	**Jake Fraser-McGurk**	Australia	11 April 2002 (age 24)	Right-handed	Right arm leg spin	
32	Caleb Jewell	Australia	21 April 1997 (age 29)	Left-handed	Left-arm medium	
19	Oliver Peake	Australia	11 September 2006 (age 19)	Left-handed	Right-arm medium	
All-rounders
98	Hassan Khan	United States	16 October 1998 (age 27)	Right-handed	Left-arm orthodox	Overseas draft pick (Gold)
	Will Salzmann	Australia	19 November 2003 (age 22)	Right-handed	Right-arm medium	
7	**Matthew Spoors**	Canada	6 May 1999 (age 27)	Right-handed	Right-arm Leg break	Replacement player for Lyon.
12	**Will Sutherland**	Australia	27 October 1999 (age 26)	Right-handed	Right-arm fast	Captain
Wicketkeepers
16	**Mohammad Rizwan**	Pakistan	1 June 1992 (age 34)	Right-handed	—N/a	Overseas draft pick (Platinum)
43	**Tim Seifert**	New Zealand	14 December 1994 (age 31)	Right-handed	—N/a	Overseas draft pick (Gold)
Pace bowlers
5	**Jason Behrendorff**	Australia	20 April 1990 (age 36)	Right-handed	Left-arm fast	
35	**Brendan Doggett**	Australia	3 May 1994 (age 32)	Right-handed	Right-arm fast	
1	Sam Elliott	Australia	18 February 2000 (age 26)	Right-handed	Right-arm medium	Replacement player for Salzmann.
69	Fergus O'Neill	Australia	27 January 2001 (age 25)	Right-handed	Right-arm fast	
8	Tom Rogers	Australia	3 March 1994 (age 32)	Left-handed	Right-arm fast	
28	**Gurinder Sandhu**	Australia	14 June 1993 (age 33)	Left-handed	Right-arm fast	
68	**Andrew Tye**	Australia	12 December 1986 (age 39)	Right-handed	Right-arm medium-fast	Replacement player for Rogers.
Spin bowlers
44	Michael Archer	Australia	28 February 1997 (age 29)	Right-handed	Right-arm leg spin	Replacement player for Zampa.
67	**Nathan Lyon**	Australia	20 November 1987 (age 38)	Right-handed	Right-arm off spin	
24	Callum Stow	Australia	27 August 2002 (age 23)	Right-handed	Left-arm unorthodox	
88	**Adam Zampa**	Australia	31 March 1992 (age 34)	Right-handed	Right-arm leg spin	

== Regular season ==
=== League table ===
Pos	Team	Pld	W	L	NR	Pts	NRR	Qualification
1	Perth Scorchers (C)	10	7	3	0	14	1.363	Advanced to the Qualifier
2	Sydney Sixers (R)	10	6	3	1	13	0.605	Advanced to the Qualifier
3	Hobart Hurricanes	10	6	3	1	13	0.331	Advanced to the Knockout
4	Melbourne Stars	10	6	4	0	12	0.759	Advanced to the Knockout
5	Brisbane Heat	10	5	5	0	10	−0.431	
6	Adelaide Strikers	10	4	6	0	8	−0.231	
7	Melbourne Renegades	10	3	7	0	6	−1.202	
8	Sydney Thunder	10	2	8	0	4	−1.212	

Source: ESPNcricinfo
(C) Champions; (R) Runners-up

=== Matches ===
Match 2
15 December 2025
19:15 (N)
Scorecard

Melbourne Renegades; 5/212 (20 overs)	v	Brisbane Heat; 8/198 (20 overs)
Tim Seifert 102 (56); Jack Wildermuth 3/34 (4 overs)		Colin Munro 55 (32); Will Sutherland 3/33 (4 overs)

Melbourne Renegades won by 14 runs
Kardinia Stadium, Geelong
Attendance: 10,043
Umpires: Phillip Gillespie and Sam Nogajski
Player of the match: Tim Seifert (Melbourne Renegades)

- Brisbane Heat won the toss and elected to field.

Match 8
21 December 2025
19:15 (N)
Scorecard

Melbourne Renegades; 9/145 (20 overs)	v	Hobart Hurricanes; 3/149 (13.5 overs)
Tim Seifert 34 (21); Chris Jordan 4/19 (4 overs)		Nikhil Chaudhary 79 (38); Jason Behrendorff 2/35 (3 overs)

Hobart Hurricanes won by 7 wickets
Kardinia Stadium, Geelong
Attendance: 10,267
Umpires: Gerard Abood and Stephen Dionysius
Player of the match: Chris Jordan (Hobart Hurricanes)

- Hobart Hurricanes won the toss and elected to field.
- Tim Ward (Hobart Hurricanes) made his T20 debut.

Match 15
29 December 2025
19:15 (N)
Scorecard

Melbourne Renegades; 9/162 (20 overs)	v	Hobart Hurricanes; 6/163 (19 overs)
Oliver Peake 29 (22); Nathan Ellis 3/30 (4 overs)		Matthew Wade 43* (20); Adam Zampa 3/25 (4 overs)

Hobart Hurricanes won by 4 wickets
Bellerive Oval, Hobart
Attendance: 9,195
Umpires: Shawn Craig and Chris Grant
Player of the match: Nathan Ellis (Hobart Hurricanes)

- Hobart Hurricanes won the toss and elected to field.

Match 18
1 January 2026
16:00 (D/N)
Scorecard

Melbourne Renegades; 9/164 (20 overs)	v	Sydney Sixers; 4/168 (19.1 overs)
Josh Brown 43 (19); Sean Abbott 3/16 (4 overs)		Babar Azam 58* (46); Gurinder Sandhu 2/23 (4 overs)

Sydney Sixers won by 6 wickets
Docklands Stadium, Melbourne
Attendance: 26,865
Umpires: Stephen Dionysius and Sharad Patel
Player of the match: Sean Abbott (Sydney Sixers)

- Sydney Sixers won the toss and elected to field.

Match 22
4 January 2026
18:05 (N)
Scorecard

Melbourne Stars; 9/173 (20 overs)	v	Melbourne Renegades; 6/177 (19.5 overs)
Tom Curran 38 (18); Gurinder Sandhu 4/41 (4 overs)		Josh Brown 84 (48); Peter Siddle 2/39 (4 overs)

Melbourne Renegades won by 4 wickets
Melbourne Cricket Ground, Melbourne
Umpires: Gerard Abood and Donovan Koch
Player of the match: Josh Brown (Melbourne Renegades)

- Melbourne Renegades won the toss and elected to field.

Match 26
7 January 2026
19:15 (D/N)
Scorecard

Perth Scorchers; 127 (19.2 overs)	v	Melbourne Renegades; 6/130 (20 overs)
Aaron Hardie 44 (40); Gurinder Sandhu 4/28 (4 overs)		Oliver Peake 42* (30); Ashton Turner 1/1 (1 over)

Melbourne Renegades won by 4 wickets
Perth Stadium, Perth
Umpires: Eloise Sheridan and Ben Treloar
Player of the match: Oliver Peake (Melbourne Renegades)

- Melbourne Renegades won the toss and elected to field.

Match 30
10 January 2026
19:15 (N)
Scorecard

Melbourne Renegades; 7/166 (20 overs)	v	Melbourne Stars; 2/170 (15.5 overs)
Josh Brown 80 (50); Marcus Stoinis 3/33 (4 overs)		Sam Harper 84* (51); Hassan Khan 1/20 (3 overs)

Melbourne Stars won by 8 wickets
Docklands Stadium, Melbourne
Umpires: Sam Nogajski (Aus) and Riki Wessels (Eng)
Player of the match: Sam Harper (Melbourne Stars)

- Melbourne Stars won the toss and elected to field.

Match 33
12 January 2026
19:15 (N)
Scorecard

Melbourne Renegades; 8/170 (20 overs)	v	Sydney Thunder; 6/140 (15.2 overs)
Hassan Khan 46 (31); Wes Agar 2/23 (4 overs)		Chris Green 34* (13); Gurinder Sandhu 4/42 (4 overs)

Sydney Thunder won by 4 wickets (DLS method)
Sydney Showground Stadium, Sydney
Umpires: Sam Nogajski and Troy Penman
Player of the match: Chris Green (Sydney Thunder)

- Sydney Thunder won the toss and elected to field.
- Sydney Thunder were set a revised target of 140 runs from 16 overs due to rain.

Match 36
15 January 2026
19:15 (N)
Scorecard

Perth Scorchers; 7/219 (20 overs)	v	Melbourne Renegades; 7/169 (20 overs)
Finn Allen 101 (53); Sam Elliott 4/28 (3 overs)		Tim Seifert 66 (43); Cooper Connolly 2/23 (4 overs)

Perth Scorchers won by 50 runs
Docklands Stadium, Melbourne
Umpires: Sam Nogajski and Ben Treloar
Player of the match: Finn Allen (Perth Scorchers)

- Melbourne Renegades won the toss and elected to field.
- Perth Scorchers secured a spot in the finals as a result of this match, while Melbourne Renegades were eliminated from finals contention as a result of this match.

Match 38
17 January 2026
17:00 (D/N)
Scorecard

Melbourne Renegades; 99 (16.5 overs)	v	Adelaide Strikers; 2/100 (11.5 overs)
Will Sutherland 38 (28); Tabraiz Shamsi 4/15 (3.5 overs)		Matthew Short 30 (22); Callum Stow 1/8 (2 overs)

Adelaide Strikers won by 8 wickets
Adelaide Oval, Adelaide
Umpires: Donovan Koch and Troy Penman
Player of the match: Tabraiz Shamsi (Adelaide Strikers)

- Adelaide Strikers won the toss and elected to field.
- Michael Archer (Melbourne Renegades) made his T20 debut.
