= Oli Patterson =

Australian cricketer (born 2006)

Personal information
- Full name: Oliver Patterson
- Born: 3 January 2006 (age 20); Sydney, New South Wales, Australia
- Batting: Right-handed
- Bowling: Left-arm medium-fast
- Role: Bowler

Domestic team information
- Years: Team
- 2025/26–: Brisbane Heat (squad no. 54)
- 2026–: Queensland (squad no. 54)

Career statistics
Competition	LA	T20
Matches	5	3
Runs scored	39	21
Batting average	9.75	21.00
100s/50s	0/0	0/0
Top score	17	19*
Balls bowled	234	58
Wickets	4	4
Bowling average	76.00	22.00
5 wickets in innings	0	0
10 wickets in match	0	0
Best bowling	1/39	2/32
Catches/stumpings	3/–	0/–
- Source: Cricinfo, 18 October 2026

Oliver Patterson (born 3 January 2006) is an Australian cricketer who has represented Queensland and the Brisbane Heat in domestic cricket.

== Early life ==
Patterson was born in Sydney, Australia. He began playing cricket at the age of eight for the Eastern Suburbs Junior Cricket Club in Sydney. He played for Avalon in the Manly Junior Cricket Association for the 11-12's age group, and played in junior representative sides for Manly District.

Patterson attended school at Cranbrook School. He represented their first XI team for three years, where he received several bowling awards, as well as achieving the side's highest ever individual score of 204.

Patterson first played 1st Grade Premier Cricket at the age of 18 for the Eastern Suburbs Cricket Club in the NSW Premier Cricket competition, before making the move to Queensland where he joined the Western Suburbs District Cricket Club in the Queensland Premier Cricket competition.

== Domestic Career ==
Patterson played for New South Wales at under-17 and under-19 level.

Patterson gained attention from the Brisbane Heat after his season with Western Suburbs in the Queensland T20 Max competition. He took 15 wickets at an average of 9.73. He signed with the Heat ahead of the 2025–26 Big Bash League season. He made his debut against the Adelaide Strikers.

In February 2026, Patterson was added to the Queensland squad ahead of their match against Victoria in the One Day Cup. He made his debut and took his first wicket in List A cricket, getting Victoria wicket-keeper Sam Harper caught at slip.

== International Career ==
Patterson was part of the Australian under-19 squad for their tour of India in 2024. He played two Youth ODI's and one Youth Test.

== Personal life ==
Patterson's father, Mark Patterson, played first-class and List A cricket for New South Wales.
