= Mark Patterson (Australian cricketer) =

Australian cricketer (born 1966)

Personal information
- Born: 15 November 1966 (age 59); Dubbo, Australia
- Source: ESPNcricinfo, 14 January 2017

Mark Patterson (born 15 November 1966) is an Australian former cricketer. He played three first-class and four List A matches for New South Wales between 1994/95 and 1995/96.

Patterson's son, Oliver Patterson, is also an Australian cricketer.

== See also ==
- List of New South Wales representative cricketers
