= Joel Davies =

Australian cricketer (born 2003)

Personal information
- Full name: Joel Derek Davies
- Born: 28 September 2003 (age 23); Hurstville, New South Wales, Australia
- Batting: Left-handed
- Bowling: Slow left-arm orthodox
- Role: Bowler
- Relatives: Oliver Davies (brother)

International information
- National side: Australia (2026–present)
- T20I debut (cap 118): 17 June 2026 v Bangladesh
- Last T20I: 21 November 2026 v England

Domestic team information
- Years: Team
- 2022/23: Sydney Thunder (squad no. 51)
- 2023/24–present: Sydney Sixers (squad no. 51)
- 2025/26–present: New South Wales

Career statistics
Competition	T20I	FC	LA	T20
Matches	4	5	4	27
Runs scored	21	217	20	210
Batting average	21.00	31.00	10.00	17.50
100s/50s	0/0	0/1	0/0	0/0
Top score	13*	52*	20	35*
Balls bowled	66	629	132	336
Wickets	5	9	4	20
Bowling average	16.00	31.22	39.25	19.70
5 wickets in innings	0	0	0	0
10 wickets in match	0	0	0	0
Best bowling	3/17	3/55	1/10	3/17
Catches/stumpings	3/–	1/–	1/–	15/–
- Source: ESPNcricinfo, 22 November 2026

Joel Derek Davies (born 28 September 2003) is an Australian cricketer who plays for Sydney Sixers in the Big Bash League. Davies previously played for Sydney Thunder. He is a left-handed batsman and left arm orthodox spin bowler.

== Domestic career ==
Davies was playing Sydney Premier Cricket for Manly Warringah from the age of 14. He averaged over 114 as he captained NSW Metro to the 2022 national under-19 championships with Davies scoring 458 runs across 6 matches. This form led to his signing with the Sydney Thunder for the 2022–23 Big Bash League season. He made his Big Bash debut on 4 January 2023 against the Perth Scorchers taking 2 catches and being credited for 2 run outs. Prior to that, he had caused another run out of Tim David with a direct hit as a substitute fielder against Hobart Hurricanes on 31 December 2022.

He was given a full contract by Sydney Sixers for 2023–24 Big Bash League season. He played in the Big Bash final on 24 January 2024, as Sydney Sixers lost to Brisbane Heat at the Sydney Cricket Ground. He was awarded a rookie contract by New South Wales cricket team in April 2024.

Davies made his Sheffield Shield debut in December 2025, scoring an unbeaten half-century against Queensland. That season, Davies became a regular starter for Sydney Sixers, including a match-of-the-match award in the Challenger match against Hobart Hurricanes, as they reached the final of the 2025–26 Big Bash League.

== International career ==
In December 2022 he was called up as captain to the Australia under-19 cricket squad to face the touring England under-19s. He had previously been a reserve for the 2022 ICC Under-19 Cricket World Cup.

In December 2023, he was called up to the senior Australia national cricket team for their T20 tour India, however didn't play a match. In May 2026, he was again named in the Australia squad for a T20 tour of Bangladesh, making his debut in the first match and finishing with figures of 3/17.

== Personal life ==
He is the younger brother of Australian cricketer Oliver Davies. In 2018, in different grades both brothers scored centuries for Manly against St George in the Sydney club competition, whilst their father Kevin was scoring a century for Warringah's fourth grade Shires club. Through their mum, the Davies brothers are eligible to get a Trinidad passport and grew up supporting both Australia and the West Indies.
