= Hamish McKenzie (cricketer) =

Australian cricketer (born 1999)

Hamish Mckenzie
Personal information
- Born: 21 September 1999 (age 27); North Sydney, New South Wales
- Nickname: Chief
- Batting: Left-handed
- Bowling: Left-arm unorthodox spin
- Role: Bowler

Domestic team information
- Years: Team
- 2023/24-2024/25: Western Australia
- 2023/24: Perth Scorchers
- 2024/25-Present: Melbourne Stars
- FC debut: 4 November 2023 Western Australia v NSW

Career statistics
Competition	FC	LA	T20
Matches	2	1	4
Runs scored	29	9	6
Batting average	7.25	9.00	6.00
100s/50s	0	0	0
Top score	22	9	6
Balls bowled	66	54	24
Wickets	3	1	2
Bowling average	49.33	65.00	30.50
5 wickets in innings	0	0	0
10 wickets in match	0	0	0
Best bowling	2/37	1/65	2/12
Catches/stumpings	1/-	1/-	0/-
- Source: CricInfo, 14 December 2024

Hamish McKenzie (born 21 September 1999) is an Australian cricketer for Western Australia and Melbourne Stars. He is a left handed batsman and bowls left-arm unorthodox spin. He made his first class debut on 4 November 2023 against NSW. He made his Big Bash League debut on 10 December 2023 for Perth Scorchers against Melbourne Renegades.

== Career ==
McKenzie plays for Subiaco-Floreat in Grade Cricket and was awarded the man-of-the-match award in March 2022 as they won the one day final. He also took 65 wickets at an average of 13.32 across all formats to win the 2021-22 Olly Cooley Medal as WA Premier Cricket's best player.

In May 2022, he signed a rookie contract with the Western Australia cricket team. Playing for a Western Australia XI against the touring Indian team he took the wickets of Hardik Pandya and Dinesh Karthik in October 2022. He credited former test spinner Brad Hogg with helping him learn the professionalism necessary to make it at a higher level. In December 2022, he signed a contract with Perth Scorchers for the Big Bash League.

Mackenzie made his first class debut for Western Australia on 4 November 2023, against NSW. He was also confirmed as returning for Perth Scorchers for the 2023–24 Big Bash League season. He made his debut for the Scorchers in December 2023 but did not bowl in a game abandoned because of rain against the Melbourne Renegades. He took his first wickets in his second game, dismissing Hilton Cartwright and Usama Mir in a spell of 2-13.

In August 2024, he signed for Big Bash team Melbourne Stars on a two-year contract.
