= Luke Holt =

Australian cricketer (born 2003)

Personal information
- Born: 22 October 2003 (age 23)
- Batting: Right-handed
- Bowling: Right-arm leg break
- Role: Bowler

Domestic team information
- Years: Team
- 2025/26–: Perth Scorchers (squad no. 9)

Career statistics
Competition	T20
Matches	3
Runs scored	8
Batting average	–
100s/50s	0/0
Top score	8*
Balls bowled	30
Wickets	1
Bowling average	52.00
5 wickets in innings	0
10 wickets in match	0
Best bowling	1/22
Catches/stumpings	2/–
- Source: CricInfo, 22 January 2026

Luke Holt (born 22 October 2003) is an Australian cricketer who has represented the Perth Scorchers in domestic cricket. He is a right-arm leg break bowler.

== Domestic career ==
Holt played Western Australia Premier Cricket for Willetton. He was named in the WA Premier Cricket Male Team of the Year 2024-25 after taking 37 wickets.

Holt was added to the Scorchers squad as a Local Replacement Player in January 2026 after an injury to Ashton Agar. He made his debut against the Adelaide Strikers.

== International career ==
Holt represented Australia at under 19 level. In a four-day match against England, Holt, batting higher up in the order as a Nightwatchman, ultimately sealed victory for Australia alongside Hugh Weibgen.
