= Oliver Davies (cricketer) =

Australian cricketer (born 2000)

Ollie Davies
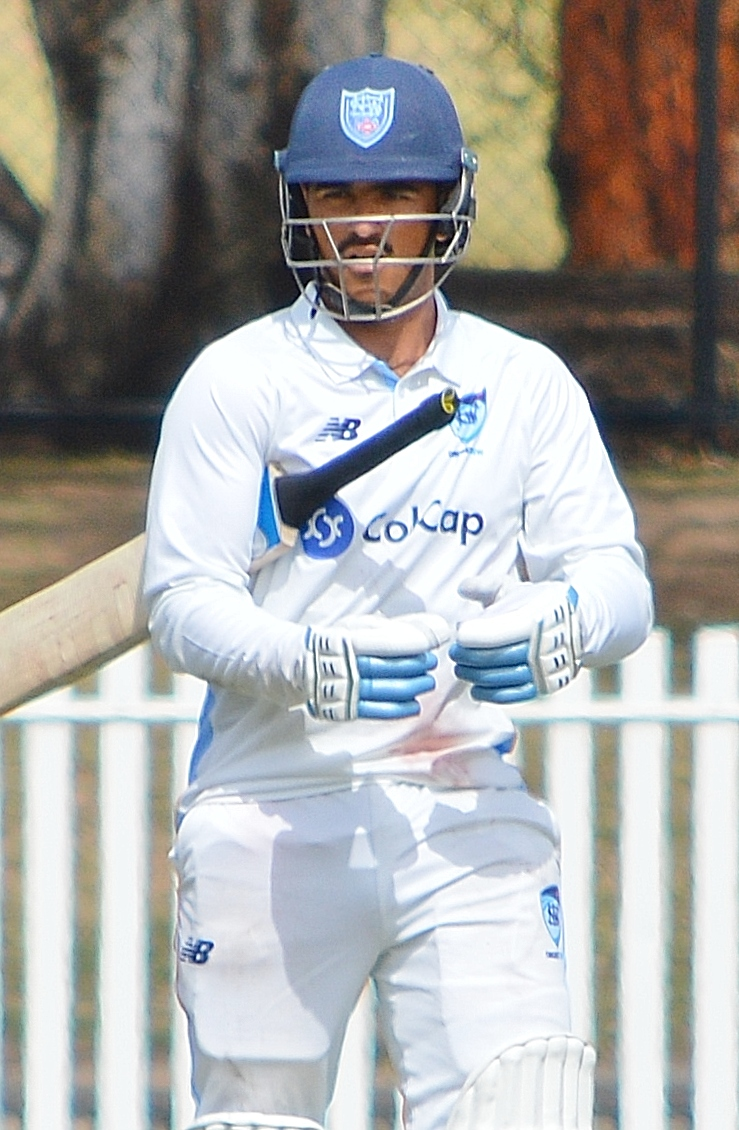
- Davies playing First Class cricket with New South Wales in October 2025

Personal information
- Full name: Oliver Henry Leon Davies
- Born: 14 October 2000 (age 26); Curl Curl, New South Wales, Australia
- Height: 179 cm (5 ft 10 in)
- Batting: Right-handed
- Bowling: Right-arm off break
- Role: Top-order batter
- Relatives: Joel Davies (brother)

Domestic team information
- Years: Team
- 2020/21–present: Sydney Thunder (squad no. 9)
- 2020/21–present: New South Wales (squad no. 14)

Career statistics
Competition	FC	LA	T20
Matches	27	31	49
Runs scored	1,690	726	836
Batting average	37.55	27.92	19.90
100s/50s	4/8	0/2	0/3
Top score	253	57	65
Balls bowled	456	72	25
Wickets	3	4	0
Bowling average	103.00	21.75	–
5 wickets in innings	0	0	–
10 wickets in match	0	0	–
Best bowling	2/105	2/12	–
Catches/stumpings	22/–	18/–	16/–
- Source: ESPNcricinfo, 25 October 2026

Oliver Henry Leon Davies (born 14 October 2000) is an Australian cricketer who plays for New South Wales and the Sydney Thunder. He is an aggressive right-handed batter, often attacking spin bowling. He is eligible to play for either Australia or West Indies.

== Career ==
Prior to his Twenty20 debut, he was named in Australia's squad for the 2020 Under-19 Cricket World Cup. He made his Twenty20 debut on 22 December 2020, for the Sydney Thunder, in the 2020–21 Big Bash League season. He made his List A debut on 15 February 2021, for New South Wales in the 2020–21 Marsh One-Day Cup. He made his First class debut on 2 March 2023, for New South Wales in the 2022–23 Sheffield Shield season.

At the conclusion of the 2023–24 Sheffield Shield season, Davies was the top scorer for New South Wales, scoring 670 runs at an average of 67.00 and was named in the Cricket Australia team of the tournament. In October 2024, he was named in the Australia A squad for the India A tour of Australia.

== Personal life ==
Ollie attended St Paul's College, Manly and was in the same year as soccer player Calem Nieuwenhof. His younger brother, Joel Davies, is also a cricketer, who signed with Sydney Thunder during the 2022–23 Big Bash League season. Through their mother the Davies brothers are eligible to get a Trinidad passport and grew up supporting both Australia and the West Indies.
