= Caleb Jewell =

Australian cricketer (born 1997)

Personal information
- Full name: Caleb Paul Jewell
- Born: 21 April 1997 (age 29); Hobart, Tasmania, Australia
- Batting: Left-handed
- Role: Batter

Domestic team information
- Years: Team
- 2015/16–present: Tasmania (squad no. 32)
- 2018–2025: Hobart Hurricanes (squad no. 32)
- 2025–2026: Derbyshire (squad no. 23)
- 2025/26–present: Melbourne Renegades (squad no. 13)

Career statistics
Competition	FC	LA	T20
Matches	82	68	83
Runs scored	4,720	2,337	1,719
Batting average	32.32	38.31	22.32
100s/50s	9/24	6/11	0/9
Top score	232	137	76
Catches/stumpings	55/–	31/1	32/–
- Source: ESPNcricinfo, 25 October 2026

Caleb Paul Jewell (born 21 April 1997) is an Australian cricketer. He made his first-class debut for Tasmania on 15 March 2016 in the 2015–16 Sheffield Shield. In September 2018, he was named in the Hobart Hurricanes' squad for the 2018 Abu Dhabi T20 Trophy. He made his Twenty20 debut for the Hobart Hurricanes in the 2018 Abu Dhabi T20 Trophy on 5 October 2018. In February 2021, during the 2020–21 Sheffield Shield season, Jewell scored his maiden first-class century.

For the 2023 UK cricket season, he signed for Doncaster Town Cricket Club. In September 2024, Jewell signed a deal with Derbyshire to be one of their 2025 season overseas players. He scored his highest first-class score to date of 232 whilst playing for Derbyshire in their game against Kent on Saturday 24th May 2025. This game was in Division 2 of the English County Championship at the County Ground, Derby.

Jewell joined the Melbourne Renegades for the 2025–26 Big Bash League season.
