= Josh Brown (cricketer) =

Australian cricketer (born 1993)

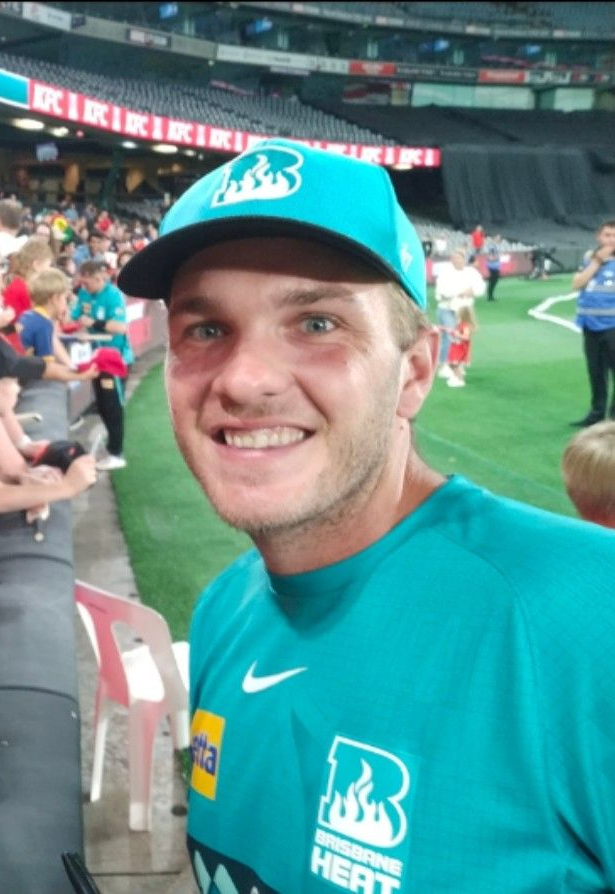
- Brown in 2023

Personal information
- Born: 26 December 1993 (age 32); Brisbane, Queensland
- Height: 1.90 m (6 ft 3 in)
- Batting: Right-handed
- Bowling: Right-arm medium
- Role: Batter

Domestic team information
- Years: Team
- 2024/25–: Melbourne Renegades (squad no. 6)
- 2022/23–2023/24: Brisbane Heat (squad no. 98)
- 2022/23: Queensland
- 2024: Chattogram Challengers
- 2024/25: Victoria
- 2025: Sudurpashim Royals
- 2025: Montreal Royal Tigers
- T20 debut: 15 December 2022 Brisbane Heat v Melbourne Renegades

Career statistics
Competition	List A	Twenty20
Matches	5	50
Runs scored	69	1256
Batting average	13.80	25.12
100s/50s	0/0	1/5
Top score	38	140
Balls bowled	57	-
Wickets	1	-
Bowling average	66.00	–
5 wickets in innings	0	–
10 wickets in match	0	–
Best bowling	1/38	–
Catches/stumpings	2/–	14/–
- Source: Cricinfo, 23 January 2026

Joshua Brown (born 26 December 1993) is an Australian cricketer who plays for Melbourne Renegades in the Big Bash League. He is a right-handed batsman and a right-arm medium pace bowler.

Typically a big-striking opening batsman, Brown played in two Big Bash Finals for Brisbane Heat, winning one title. Outside of his native Australia, he has played in professional short-form cricket leagues in Asia and North America. Predominantly a Twenty20 cricketer, he has also played List A cricket for Queensland and Victoria.

== Biography ==
Brown grew up in Brisbane and played soccer as a youth, only starting playing cricket at the age 13 years-old. At the age of 23 years-old he quickly progressed from third grade cricket to the Queensland Second XI within 18 months. He played grade cricket for Northern Suburbs District Cricket Club, and in 2019, played club cricket in England for Histon CC in the Cambridge and Hunts Premier League. His time in England included a knock of 290 runs from 149 balls against March Town CC which included 25 fours and 25 sixes. In August 2022, Brown hit the second highest score ever in the Queensland T20 Max competition, when he hit 159 from 59 balls whilst opening the batting for Northern Districts. He makes cricket bats, including his own.

Brown made his debut in the Big Bash for Brisbane Heat on 15 December 2022 against the Melbourne Renegades. In his second match, on January 1, 2023, he scored 62 runs from 23 balls and won the Player of the Match award against the Sydney Sixers. It was the fifth fastest half-century in club history, but Brown was so new to the team he did not even have his name on the back of his kit. Commentator Adam Gilchrist described Brown as "his new favourite player" and Brown spoke of this being meaningful as he had himself taken time-off school to watch Gilchrist play at The Gabba. Brown received publicity because uniquely in modern sport he played the innings using a bat he had made himself. Brown played consistently at the top of the batting order for Brisbane Heat throughout the rest of the 2022-23 Big Bash and they reached the final against Perth Scorchers on February 4, 2023. In the Big Bash Final, Brown opened the innings as Brisbane batted first and scored 25 from twelve balls with the Scorchers ultimately winning the title. On 26 February 2023, he made his List A debut for Queensland against the New South Wales in the 2022–23 Marsh One-Day Cup.

He was given a full contract by Brisbane Heat for 2023-24 Big Bash League season. On 22 January 2024, Brown hit the equal second-fastest century in the competition's history, reaching 100 from 41 balls, before finishing on 140 runs from 57 balls including a tournament record 12 sixes as well as 10 fours in the Qualifier Final against the Adelaide Strikers in Carrara, Queensland. It was also the third highest individual score in Big Bash history. The innings propelled the Brisbane Heat into the BBL13 Final against the Sydney Sixers. On 24 January 2024 he opened the batting in the Big Bash Final for the second consecutive season. He top scored for Brisbane Heat with 53 from 38 balls, as his side won the title, defeating Sydney Sixers at the Sydney Cricket Ground.

In January 2024, Brown signed for the Chattogram Challengers for the Bangladesh Premier League. In April 2024, he agreed a two-year contract with the Melbourne Renegades.

In September 2024, he made his debut for Victoria cricket team in the One-Day Cup in a four-wicket victory over Tasmanian Tigers. However, Brown was delisted by Victoria after only one season with the state.

In October 2025, he played in Super 60 Cricket League Canada for Montreal Royal Tigers. The following month, he signed for Sudurpashim Royals for the 2025 Nepal Premier League.
