= Tom Rogers (cricketer, born 1999) =

Australian cricketer (born 1999)

Personal information
- Full name: Thomas Fraser Rogers
- Born: 7 February 1999 (age 27); Greensborough, Victoria, Australia
- Batting: Left-handed
- Bowling: Right-arm medium
- Role: Top-order batter

Domestic team information
- Years: Team
- 2021/22–: Melbourne Stars (squad no. 3)
- 2022/23–: Victoria
- 2026: Galle Gallants

Career statistics
Competition	FC	LA	T20
Matches	9	26	48
Runs scored	342	883	818
Batting average	24.42	35.32	19.02
100s/50s	0/3	1/5	0/2
Top score	76	196	53
Catches/stumpings	8/–	12/–	27/–
- Source: Cricinfo, 25 October 2026

Thomas Fraser Rogers (born 7 February 1999) is an Australian cricketer.

Rogers has played T20 for the Melbourne Stars since the 2021–22 season. He made his debut on 2 January 2022, as one of six replacement players called into the squad in January 2022 during the 2021–22 Big Bash League season after ten members of the original squad became unavailable due to contracting COVID-19. Rogers was subsequently ruled out of the Stars' next game against the Melbourne Renegades only one day later after testing positive to COVID-19.
