= Will Sutherland =

Australian cricketer

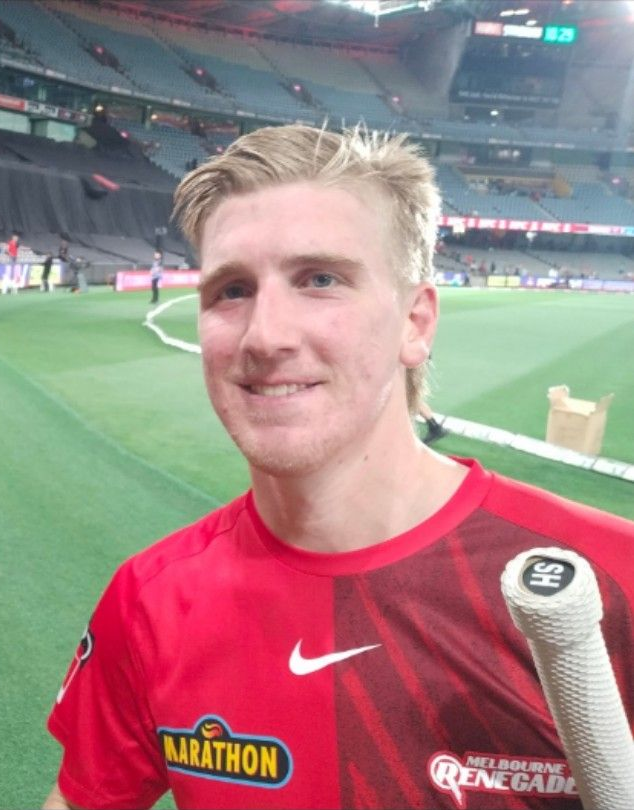
- Sutherland in 2023

Personal information
- Full name: William James Sutherland
- Born: 27 October 1999 (age 27); East Melbourne, Victoria, Australia
- Height: 1.95 m (6 ft 5 in)
- Batting: Right handed
- Bowling: Right arm medium-fast
- Role: All-rounder
- Relatives: James Sutherland (father); Annabel Sutherland (sister)

International information
- National side: Australia (2024)
- ODI debut (cap 247): 4 February 2024 v West Indies
- Last ODI: 6 February 2024 v West Indies
- ODI shirt no.: 3

Domestic team information
- Years: Team
- 2017/18–present: Victoria (squad no. 12)
- 2018/19–present: Melbourne Renegades
- 2025: Yorkshire

Career statistics
Competition	ODI	FC	LA	T20
Matches	2	59	53	85
Runs scored	18	1,591	933	958
Batting average	18.00	19.40	24.55	17.74
100s/50s	0/0	2/3	1/5	0/3
Top score	18	101*	100	70
Balls bowled	51	9,852	2,426	1,293
Wickets	2	187	73	53
Bowling average	16.50	24.54	31.30	37.03
5 wickets in innings	0	7	1	0
10 wickets in match	0	0	0	0
Best bowling	2/28	6/67	5/45	3/14
Catches/stumpings	1/–	57/–	27/–	40/–
- Source: Cricinfo, 25 October 2026

William James Sutherland (born 27 October 1999) is an Australian cricketer. He made his List A debut for Cricket Australia XI against Pakistan during their tour of Australia on 10 January 2017. In July 2017, he took a multi-year deal with Victoria, rather than playing in the AFL. He attended Scotch College and is the son of James Sutherland, the former CEO of Cricket Australia.

In December 2017, he was named as the vice captain of Australia's squad for the 2018 Under-19 Cricket World Cup. In March 2018, he won the Commonwealth Bank Future Star Award at Cricket Victoria awards ceremony.

He made his Twenty20 debut for Melbourne Renegades in the 2018–19 Big Bash League season on 20 December 2018. In 2023, Will Sutherland was named the captain of the Melbourne renegades, taking over captaincy from Nic Maddinson. In only his second game of the 2019–20 Marsh One-Day Cup, Sutherland was named Man of the Match, making his maiden List-A half century scoring 54 runs, and followed it up with bowling figures of 2/43, guiding his team to a 1 run victory.

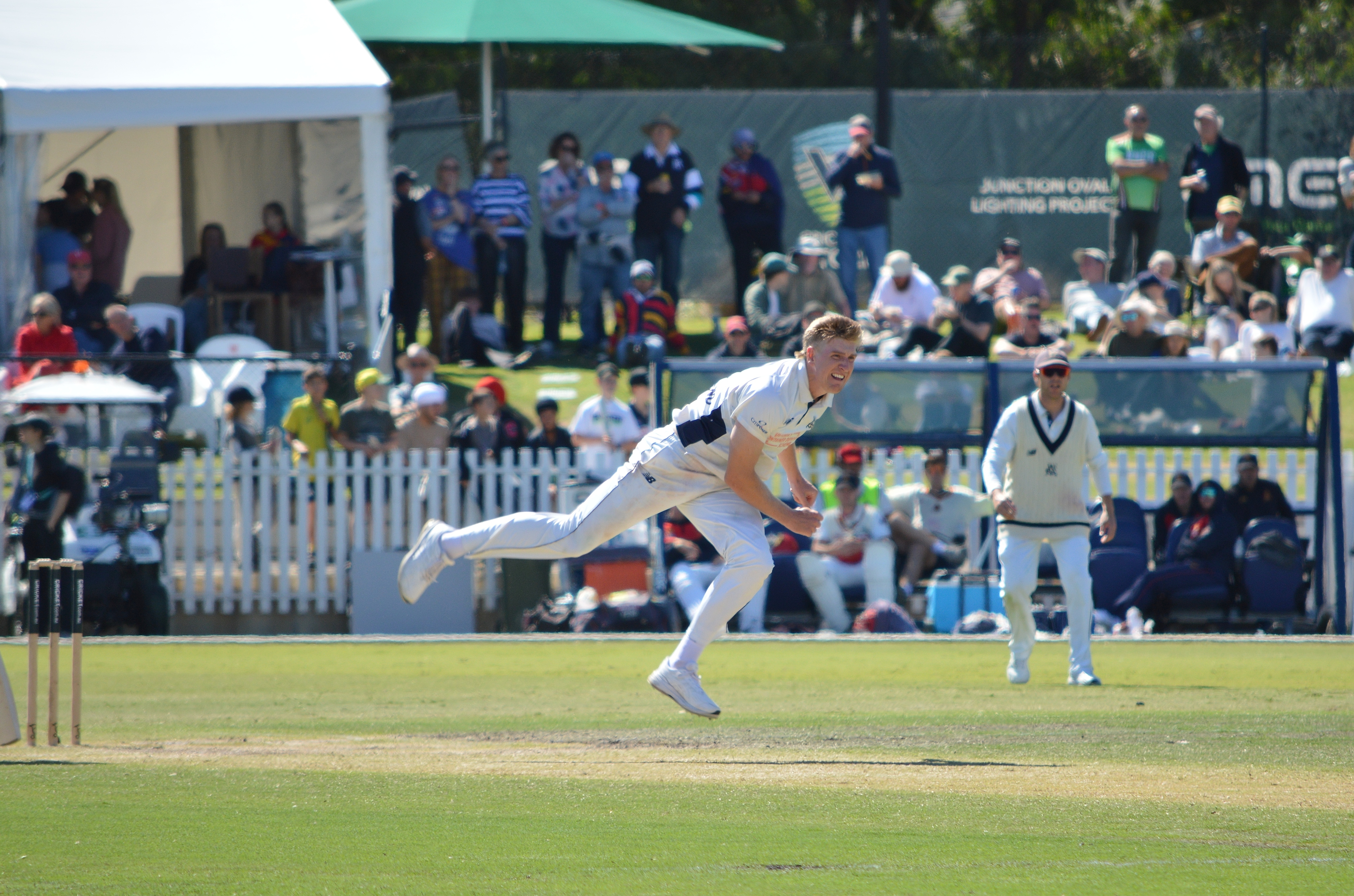
Sutherland became the full-time for Victoria in 2024 and captained the team to the 2025–26 Sheffield Shield final (pictured).

He made his first-class debut on 12 November 2019, for Victoria in the 2019–20 Sheffield Shield season. In February 2020, in the round eight match against Queensland, Sutherland took his maiden five-wicket haul in first-class cricket, with 5/34. A year later, Sutherland was named the Bradman Young Cricketer of the Year at the 2021 Australian Cricket Awards.

Sutherland was ruled out of stints with both Essex and Somerset due to injuries.

In January 2024, he was named in the Australian squad for the ODI series against West Indies. He made his international debut in the second match, and took one catch with bowling figures of 2/28.

In January 2025, Sutherland signed to play for Yorkshire in the T20 Blast and County Championship.
