= 2021–22 Big Bash League season squads =

The 2021–22 Big Bash League season is the eleventh season of the Big Bash League, the premier Twenty20 cricket competition in Australia. Each 2021–22 squad is made up of 18 active players. Teams can sign up to five overseas players, with a maximum of three of those being able to play in a matchday.

== Adelaide Strikers ==
- Players with international caps are listed in **bold**.
- Ages are given as of the first match of the tournament, 5 December 2021

No.	Name	Nationality	Date of birth (age)	Batting style	Bowling style	Notes
Batsmen
1	**Phil Salt**	England	28 August 1996 (aged 25)	Right-handed	Right-arm medium	Visa contract
28	Jake Weatherald	Australia	4 November 1994 (aged 27)	Left-handed	Right-arm leg spin	
29	Jon Wells	Australia	13 August 1988 (aged 33)	Right-handed	Right-arm medium	
34	**Travis Head**	Australia	29 December 1993 (aged 27)	Left-handed	Right-arm off spin	Captain
77	**Matt Renshaw**	Australia	28 March 1996 (aged 25)	Left-handed	Right-arm off spin	
88	Ryan Gibson	Australia	30 December 1993 (aged 27)	Right-handed	Right-arm leg spin	
All-rounders
2	Matt Short	Australia	8 November 1995 (aged 26)	Right-handed	Right-arm off spin	
6	Cameron Valente	Australia	6 September 1994 (aged 27)	Right-handed	Right-arm medium-fast	
12	Liam Scott	Australia	12 December 2000 (aged 20)	Right-handed	Right-arm fast-medium	
Wicket-keepers
4	Harry Nielsen	Australia	3 May 1995 (aged 26)	Right-handed	–	
5	**Alex Carey**	Australia	27 August 1991 (aged 30)	Left-handed	–	Vice captain
Bowlers
9	Liam O'Connor	Australia	20 June 1993 (aged 28)	Right-handed	Right-arm leg spin	
11	**Daniel Worrall**	Australia	10 July 1991 (aged 30)	Right-handed	Right-arm fast medium	
13	Harry Conway	Australia	17 September 1992 (aged 29)	Right-handed	Right-arm fast medium	
14	**Danny Briggs**	England	30 April 1991 (aged 30)	Right-handed	Left-arm orthodox	Visa contract
19	**Rashid Khan**	Afghanistan	20 September 1998 (aged 23)	Right-handed	Right-arm leg spin	Visa contract
21	**Wes Agar**	Australia	5 February 1997 (aged 24)	Right-handed	Right-arm fast	
42	Spencer Johnson	Australia	6 December 1995 (aged 25)	Left-handed	Left-arm fast-medium	
64	**Peter Siddle**	Australia	25 November 1984 (aged 37)	Right-handed	Right-arm fast medium	

== Brisbane Heat ==
The Brisbane Heat squad for the 2021–22 Big Bash League season.

- Players with international caps are listed in **bold**.
- Ages are given as of the first match of the tournament, 5 December 2021

No	Name	Nationality	Date of birth (age)	Batting style	Bowling style	Notes
Batsmen
5	**Sam Heazlett**	Australia	29 December 1990 (aged 30)	Left-handed	Left-arm orthodox	
17	Max Bryant	Australia	3 October 1999 (aged 22)	Right-handed	Right-arm medium	
26	**Tom Cooper**	Netherlands	26 November 1986 (aged 35)	Right-handed	Right-arm off-break	Non-visa Dutch international
50	**Chris Lynn**	Australia	10 April 1990 (aged 31)	Right-handed	Left-arm orthodox	
All-rounders
7	James Bazley	Australia	8 April 1995 (aged 26)	Right-handed	Right-arm medium-fast	
33	**Marnus Labuschagne**	Australia	22 June 1994 (aged 27)	Right-handed	Right-arm leg-break	
7	**Michael Neser**	Australia	29 March 1990 (aged 31)	Right-handed	Right-arm medium-fast	
–	Tom Abell	England	5 March 1994 (age 27)	Right-handed	Right-arm medium	Visa contract
24	**Jack Wildermuth**	Australia	1 September 1993 (aged 28)	Right-handed	Right-arm medium-fast	
Wicketkeepers
18	**Tom Banton**	England	11 November 1998 (aged 23)	Right-handed	–	Visa contract
–	**Ben Duckett**	England	17 October 1994 (age 27)	Left-handed	Right-arm off break	Visa contract
59	Jimmy Peirson	Australia	13 October 1992 (aged 29)	Right-handed	–	Captain
Pace bowlers
6	Mark Steketee	Australia	17 January 1994 (aged 27)	Right-handed	Right-arm fast-medium	
19	Xavier Bartlett	Australia	17 December 1998 (aged 22)	Right-handed	Right-arm medium-fast	
38	Matthew Willans	Australia	18 December 2000 (aged 20)	Right-handed	Left-arm fast	
42	Connor Sully	Australia	24 October 2000 (aged 21)	Right-handed	Right arm fast	
Spin bowlers
4	**Mitchell Swepson**	Australia	4 October 1993 (aged 28)	Right-handed	Right Arm leg break	
30	Matthew Kuhnemann	Australia	20 September 1996 (aged 25)	Left-handed	Left-arm orthodox	
88	**Mujeeb Ur Rahman**	Afghanistan	28 March 2001 (aged 20)	Right-handed	Right-arm off break	Visa contract

== Hobart Hurricanes ==
The Hobart Hurricanes squad for the 2021–22 Big Bash League season.

- Players with international caps are listed in **bold**.
- Ages are given as of the first match of the tournament, 5 December 2021

No.	Name	Nationality	Date of birth (age)	Batting style	Bowling style	Notes
Batsmen
8	**Tim David**	Singapore	16 March 1996 (aged 25)	Right-handed		Non-visa Singaporean international
41	**Colin Ingram**	South Africa	3 July 1985 (aged 36)	Left-handed		Visa contract
9	Will Jacks	England	21 November 1998 (aged 23)	Right-handed		Visa contract
1	Caleb Jewell	Australia	21 April 1997 (aged 24)	Left-handed		
29	**Dawid Malan**	England	3 September 1987 (aged 34)	Left-handed		Visa contract
-	Charlie Wakim	Australia	9 July 1991 (aged 30)	Right-handed		
33	Macalister Wright	Australia	22 January 1998 (aged 23)	Right-handed	Right-arm Leg Break	
All-rounders
72	**Nathan Ellis**	Australia	22 December 1994 (aged 26)	Right-handed	Right-arm fast medium	
44	**James Faulkner**	Australia	29 April 1990 (aged 31)	Right-Handed	Left-arm Fast medium	
16	Mitchell Owen	Australia	16 September 2001 (aged 20)	Right-handed	Right-arm fast medium	
84	**Keemo Paul**	West Indies	21 February 1998 (aged 23)	Right-handed	Right-arm fast medium	Visa contract
23	**D'Arcy Short**	Australia	8 September 1990 (aged 31)	Left-handed	Left-arm Leg spin	
23	**Johan Botha**	Australia	2 May 1982 (aged 39)	Right-handed	Right-arm Off break	
Wicket-keepers
13	**Matthew Wade**	Australia	26 December 1987 (aged 33)	Left-handed	Right-arm medium	Captain
2	Jake Doran	Australia	2 December 1996 (aged 25)	Left-handed		
28	**Ben McDermott**	Australia	12 December 1994 (aged 26)	Right-handed		
54	**Peter Handscomb**	Australia	26 December 1994 (aged 26)	Right-handed		Vice captain
Pace bowlers
15	David Moody	Australia	28 April 1995 (aged 26)	Right-handed	Right-arm fast medium	
35	Aaron Summers	Australia	24 May 1996 (aged 25)	Right-handed	Right-arm fast	
25	**Scott Boland**	Australia	11 April 1989 (aged 32)	Right-handed	Right-arm fast medium	
21	**Riley Meredith**	Australia	21 June 1996 (aged 25)	Right-handed	Right-arm fast medium	
4	Nick Winter	Australia	19 June 1993 (aged 28)	Left-handed	Left-arm fast medium	
Spin bowlers
1	**Sandeep Lamichhane**	Nepal	2 August 2000 (aged 21)	Right-handed	Right-arm Leg spin	Visa contract
17	Wil Parker	Australia	29 May 2002 (aged 19)	Right-handed	Right-arm Leg spin	

== Melbourne Renegades ==
The squad for the 2021–22 Big Bash League season.

- Players with international caps are listed in **bold**.
- Ages are given as of the first match of the tournament, 5 December 2021

No.	Name	Nationality	Date of birth (age)	Batting style	Bowling style	Notes
Batsmen
18	Unmukt Chand	India	26 March 1993 (aged 28)	Right-handed	Right arm off break	Visa contract
5	**Aaron Finch**	Australia	17 November 1986 (aged 35)	Right-handed	Slow left arm orthodox	
23	Jake Fraser-McGurk	Australia	11 April 2002 (aged 19)	Right-handed	Right arm leg break	
14	**Marcus Harris**	Australia	21 July 1992 (aged 29)	Left-handed	Right arm off break	
3	Mackenzie Harvey	Australia	18 September 2000 (aged 21)	Left-handed	Right arm medium-fast	
53	**Nic Maddinson**	Australia	21 December 1991 (aged 29)	Left-handed	Left-arm orthodox	Captain
9	**Shaun Marsh**	Australia	9 July 1983 (age 36)	Left-handed	Slow left arm orthodox	Vice captain
35	James Seymour	Australia	13 March 1992 (age 29)	Left-handed	Right arm off break	Replacement player for Shaun Marsh
All-rounders
29	Jonathan Merlo	Australia	15 December 1998 (aged 22)	Right-handed	Right-arm medium-fast	Replacement player for Nic Maddinson
7	**Mohammad Nabi**	Afghanistan	1 January 1985 (aged 36)	Right-handed	Right arm off break	Visa contract
12	Will Sutherland	Australia	27 October 1999 (aged 22)	Right-handed	Right arm fast medium	
61	Jack Prestwidge	Australia	28 February 1996 (age 24)	Right-handed	Right-arm medium fast	
Wicketkeepers
6	Sam Harper	Australia	10 December 1996 (aged 24)	Right-handed	–	
4	Brayden Stepien	Australia	27 July 1997 (aged 24)	Right-handed	Right-arm medium	Local replacement player
Pace bowlers
2	Zak Evans	Australia	26 March 2000 (age 19)	Right-handed	Right-arm fast	
11	Josh Lalor	Australia	2 November 1987 (age 33)	Right-handed	Left arm fast medium	
19	**James Pattinson**	Australia	3 May 1990 (aged 31)	Right-handed	Right arm fast	
16	Mitchell Perry	Australia	27 April 2000 (age 20)	Left-handed	Right-arm fast medium	
55	**Kane Richardson**	Australia	12 February 1991 (aged 30)	Right-handed	Right arm fast medium	Vice captain
24	**Reece Topley**	England	21 February 1994 (age 27)	Right-handed	Left arm medium-fast	Visa contract
Spin bowlers
13	**Cameron Boyce**	Australia	27 July 1989 (aged 32)	Right-handed	Right arm leg break	
75	**Zahir Khan**	Afghanistan	20 December 1998 (aged 22)	Left-handed	Left-arm unorthodox	Visa contract

== Melbourne Stars ==
The squad for the 2021–22 Big Bash League season.

- Players with international caps are listed in **bold**.
- Ages are given as of the first match of the tournament, 5 December 2021

No.	Name	Nationality	Date of birth (age)	Batting style	Bowling style	Notes
Batsmen
15	Joe Burns	Australia	6 September 1989 (aged 32)	Right-handed	Right-arm medium	International Cap
10	Will Pucovski	Australia	2 February 1998 (aged 23)	Right-handed	Right-arm off break	International Cap
36	Nick Larkin	Australia	1 May 1990 (aged 31)	Right-handed	—	
53	Nic Maddinson	Australia	21 December 1991 (aged 29)	Left-handed	Left-arm orthodox	International Cap
All-rounders
16	Marcus Stoinis	Australia	16 August 1989 (aged 32)	Right-handed	Right-arm medium	Vice Captain; International Cap
23	Clint Hinchliffe	Australia	23 October 1996 (aged 25)	Left-handed	Slow left-arm unorthodox	
32	Glenn Maxwell	Australia	14 October 1988 (aged 33)	Right-handed	Right-arm off-spin	Captain; International Cap
35	Hilton Cartwright	Australia	14 February 1992 (aged 29)	Right-handed	Right-arm medium	International Cap
Wicketkeepers
13	Seb Gotch	Australia	12 July 1993 (aged 28)	Right-handed	Right-arm off-break	
29	Nicholas Pooran	West Indies	2 October 1995 (aged 26)	Left-handed	—	Visa Contract and International Cap
72	Andre Fletcher	West Indies	28 November 1987 (aged 34)	Right-handed	—	Visa Contract and International Cap
Pace bowlers
7	Nathan Coulter-Nile	Australia	11 October 1987 (aged 34)	Right-handed	Right-arm fast	International Cap
9	Jackson Coleman	Australia	18 December 1991 (aged 29)	Right-handed	Right-arm fast-medium	U-19 International Cap
19	Liam Hatcher	Australia	17 September 1996 (aged 25)	Right-handed	Right-arm fast	
28	Lance Morris	Australia	28 March 1998 (aged 23)	Right-handed	Right-arm fast-medium	
37	Billy Stanlake	Australia	4 November 1994 (aged 27)	Left-handed	Right-arm fast	International Cap
43	Sam Rainbird	Australia	5 June 1992 (aged 29)	Right-handed	Left-arm medium-fast	International Cap
77	Haris Rauf	Pakistan	7 November 1993 (aged 28)	Right-handed	Right-arm fast	Visa Contract and International Cap
90	Dilbar Hussain	Pakistan	20 February 1993 (aged 28)	Right-handed	Right-arm fast	Visa Contract
Spin bowlers
6	Tom O'Connell	Australia	14 June 2000 (aged 21)	Left-handed	Right-arm leg spin	
88	Adam Zampa	Australia	31 March 1992 (aged 29)	Right-handed	Right-arm leg-break	International Cap

== Perth Scorchers ==
The squad for the 2021–22 Big Bash League season.

- Players with international caps are listed in **bold**.
- Ages are given as of the first match of the tournament, 5 December 2021

No.	Name	Nationality	Date of birth (age)	Batting style	Bowling style	Notes
Batsmen
4	Cameron Bancroft	Australia	19 November 1992 (aged 29)	Right-handed	Right-arm off break	International Cap
82	Colin Munro	New Zealand	11 March 1987 (aged 34)	Left-handed	Right-arm medium	Visa Contract and International Cap
82	Laurie Evans	England	12 October 1987 (aged 34)	Left-handed	Right-arm fast medium	Visa Contract and International Cap
41	Kurtis Patterson	Australia	5 April 1993 (age 26)	Left-handed	Right-arm off break	International Cap
All-rounders
18	Ashton Agar	Australia	14 October 1993 (aged 28)	Right-handed	Slow left-arm orthodox	International Cap
10	Mitchell Marsh	Australia	20 October 1991 (aged 30)	Right-handed	Right-arm fast-medium	Captain; International Cap
17	Ashton Turner	Australia	25 January 1993 (aged 28)	Right-handed	Right-arm off break	International Cap
31	Cameron Green	Australia	3 June 1999 (age 21)	Right-handed	Right-arm fast-medium	International Cap
Wicket-keepers
95	Josh Inglis	Australia	4 March 1995 (aged 26)	Right-handed	–	
9	Sam Whiteman	Australia	19 March 1992 (aged 29)	Left-handed	–	
Pace bowlers
5	Jason Behrendorff	Australia	20 April 1990 (aged 31)	Right-handed	Left-arm fast-medium	International Cap
12	Matt Kelly	Australia	7 December 1994 (aged 26)	Right-handed	Right-arm fast-medium	
3	Joel Paris	Australia	11 December 1992 (aged 28)	Left-handed	Left-arm fast-medium	International Cap
2	Jhye Richardson	Australia	20 September 1996 (aged 25)	Right-handed	Right-arm fast	International Cap
68	Andrew Tye	Australia	12 December 1986 (aged 34)	Right-handed	Right-arm medium-fast	Vice Captain; International Cap
21	Cameron Gannon	United States	23 January 1989 (aged 32)	Right-handed	Right-arm fast-medium	International Cap
6	Liam Guthrie	Australia	9 April 1997 (aged 24)	Left-handed	Left-arm fast-medium	Local Replacement
Spin bowlers
27	Peter Hatzoglou	Australia	27 November 1998 (age 22)	Right-handed	Right-arm leg break	
–	Corey Rocchiccioli	Australia	8 October 1997 (aged 24)	Right-handed	Right-arm off break	Local Replacement

== Sydney Sixers ==
The squad for the 2021–22 Big Bash League season.

- Players with international caps are listed in **bold**.
- Ages are given as of the first match of the tournament, 5 December 2021

No	Name	Nationality	Date of birth (age)	Batting style	Bowling style	Notes
Batsmen
9	James Vince	England	14 March 1991 (aged 30)	Right-handed	Right-arm medium	Visa contract & International Cap
14	Jordan Silk	Australia	13 April 1992 (aged 29)	Right-handed	Right arm medium	
16	Daniel Hughes	Australia	16 February 1989 (aged 32)	Left-handed	Right arm medium	Vice-captain
18	Jack Edwards	Australia	19 April 2000 (aged 21)	Right-handed	Right arm medium	
All-rounders
21	Moises Henriques	Australia	1 February 1987 (aged 34)	Right-handed	Right-arm medium-fast	Captain & International Cap
26	Carlos Brathwaite	West Indies	18 July 1988 (aged 33)	Right-handed	Right arm fast-medium	Visa contract & International Cap
50	Hayden Kerr	Australia	10 April 1996 (aged 25)	Right-handed	Right arm medium-fast	
54	Dan Christian	Australia	4 May 1983 (aged 38)	Right-handed	Right arm medium-fast	International Cap
77	Sean Abbott	Australia	29 February 1992 (aged 29)	Right-handed	Right-arm fast-medium	International Cap
Wicket-keepers
22	Josh Philippe	Australia	1 June 1997 (aged 24)	Right-handed	Right-arm medium	
Pace bowlers
27	Ben Dwarshuis	Australia	23 June 1994 (aged 27)	Left-handed	Left arm fast-medium	
33	Jackson Bird	Australia	11 December 1986 (aged 34)	Right-handed	Right arm fast-medium	International Cap
59	Tom Curran	England	12 March 1995 (aged 26)	Right-handed	Right-arm fast medium	Visa contract & International Cap
78	Mickey Edwards	Australia	23 December 1994 (aged 26)	Right-handed	Right arm fast-medium	
Spin bowlers
7	Lloyd Pope	Australia	1 December 1999 (aged 22)	Right-handed	Right arm leg break	
46	Ben Manenti	Australia	23 March 1997 (aged 24)	Right-handed	Right arm off break	
67	Nathan Lyon	Australia	20 December 1987 (aged 33)	Right-handed	Right arm off break	International Cap
72	Steve O'Keefe	Australia	9 December 1984 (aged 36)	Right-handed	Slow left arm orthodox	International Cap

== Sydney Thunder ==
The squad for the 2021–22 Big Bash League season.

- Players with international caps are listed in **bold**.
- Ages are given as of the first match of the tournament, 5 December 2021

No.	Name	Nationality	Date of birth (age)	Batting style	Bowling style	Notes
Batters
18	**Usman Khawaja**	Australia	18 December 1986 (aged 34)	Left-handed	Right-arm off-break	Captain
6	**Alex Hales**	England	5 January 1989 (aged 32)	Right-handed	Right arm medium	
9	Oliver Davies	Australia	15 October 2000 (aged 21)	Right-handed	Right-arm off break	
49	Alex Ross	Australia	17 April 1992 (aged 29)	Right-handed	Right-arm off-break	
32	Jason Sangha	Australia	8 September 1999 (aged 22)	Right-handed	Right arm leg spin	
All-rounders
93	Chris Green	Australia	1 October 1993 (aged 28)	Right-handed	Right arm off-break	Vice captain
44	Nathan McAndrew	Australia	14 July 1993 (aged 28)	Right-handed	Right-arm fast medium	
95	**Daniel Sams**	Australia	27 October 1992 (aged 29)	Right-handed	Left-arm fast medium	
31	**Ben Cutting**	Australia	30 January 1987 (aged 34)	Right-handed	Right-arm fast medium	
Wicket-keepers
7	**Sam Billings**	England	15 June 1991 (aged 30)	Right-Handed	Right-arm medium	Visa contract
22	Matt Gilkes	Australia	21 August 1999 (aged 22)	Left-Handed	Left-arm medium	
16	Baxter Holt	Australia	21 October 1999 (aged 22)	Right-handed	Right-arm medium	
3	Sam Whiteman	Australia	19 March 1992 (aged 29)	Left-handed	Left-arm medium	Replacement player
Bowlers
11	**Saqib Mahmood**	England	25 February 1997 (aged 24)	Right-handed	Right-arm fast	Visa contract
35	Brendan Doggett	Australia	3 May 1994 (aged 27)	Right-handed	Right-arm fast medium	
20	**Chris Tremain**	Australia	10 August 1991 (aged 30)	Right-handed	Right-arm fast medium	
50	Jono Cook	Australia	14 December 1989 (aged 31)	Right-handed	Right arm leg spin	
28	**Gurinder Sandhu**	Australia	14 June 1993 (aged 28)	Right-handed	Right arm fast medium	
17	Tanveer Sangha	Australia	26 November 2001 (aged 20)	Right-handed	Right arm leg spin	
