= 2018–19 Melbourne Renegades season =

Melbourne Renegades
2018–19 season
- Coach: Andrew McDonald
- Captain(s): Aaron Finch
- Home ground: Marvel Stadium (Capacity: 47,000); GMHBA Stadium (Capacity: 36,000)
- BBL Season: 2nd
- BBL Finals: Champions
- Leading Run Scorer: Sam Harper (341)
- Leading Wicket Taker: Kane Richardson (24)
- Player of the Season: Daniel Christian
- Highest home attendance: 40,816 vs Melbourne Stars (17 February 2019)
- Lowest home attendance: 10,287 vs Sydney Thunder (30 January 2019)
- Average home attendance: 21,703

The 2018–19 Melbourne Renegades season is the eighth in the club's history. Coached by Andrew McDonald and captained by Aaron Finch, they competed in the BBL's 2018–19 season and they ended up winning the title.

== Fixtures ==
=== Regular season ===
Match 2

20 December 2018
19:15 (D/N)
Scorecard

Perth Scorchers; 103 (19 overs)	v	Melbourne Renegades (H); 6/107 (15.2 overs)
Michael Klinger 28 (32); Daniel Christian 3/22 (3 overs)		Sam Harper 36 (25); Jason Behrendorff 2/17 (4 overs)

Melbourne Renegades won by 4 wickets
Marvel Stadium, Melbourne
Attendance: 15,011
Umpires: Gerard Abood and Sam Nogajski
Player of the match: Usman Khan Shinwari (Melbourne Renegades)

- Melbourne Renegades won the toss and elected to field.
- Will Sutherland (Melbourne Renegades) made his T20 debut.

Match 6

23 December 2018
18:45 (D/N)
Scorecard

(H) Adelaide Strikers; 5/174 (20 overs)	v	Melbourne Renegades; 5/176 (19.1 overs)
Matthew Short 65 (41); Kane Richardson 2/39 (4 overs)		Daniel Christian 49* (27); Rashid Khan 2/13 (4 overs)

Melbourne Renegades won by 5 wickets
Adelaide Oval, Adelaide
Attendance: 34,214
Umpires: Simon Fry and Geoff Joshua
Player of the match: Daniel Christian (Melbourne Renegades)

- Melbourne Renegades won the toss and elected to field.
- Cameron Valente (Adelaide Strikers) made his T20 debut.

Match 12

29 December 2018
19:00 (D/N)
Scorecard

Sydney Sixers; 7/132 (20 overs)	v	Melbourne Renegades (H); 9/99 (20 overs)
Jordan Silk 30 (33); Kane Richardson 3/22 (4 overs)		Mackenzie Harvey 30 (24); Tom Curran 3/18 (4 overs)

Sydney Sixers win by 33 runs
Marvel Stadium, Melbourne
Attendance: 23,129
Umpires: Geoff Joshua and Sam Nogajski
Player of the match: Benjamin Manenti (Sydney Sixers)

- Melbourne Renegades won the toss and elected to field.
- Mackenzie Harvey (Melbourne Renegades) and Benjamin Manenti (Sydney Sixers) both made their T20 debuts.

Match 16

1 January 2019
19:15 (D/N)
Scorecard

Melbourne Renegades; 9/148 (20 overs)	v	Melbourne Stars (H); 3/151 (17.5 overs)
Daniel Christian 32 (28); Dwayne Bravo 3/27 (4 overs)		Marcus Stoinis 78* (49); Cameron Boyce 2/23 (4 overs)

Melbourne Stars won by 7 wickets
Melbourne Cricket Ground, Melbourne
Attendance: 46,418
Umpires: Shawn Craig and John Ward
Player of the match: Marcus Stoinis (Melbourne Stars)

- Melbourne Stars won the toss and elected to field.
- Jonathan Merlo (Melbourne Stars) made his T20 debut.

Match 18

3 January 2019
19:15 (D/N)
Scorecard

Adelaide Strikers; 6/158 (20 overs)	v	Melbourne Renegades (H); 9/126 (20 overs)
Jake Weatherald 71 (44); Cameron Boyce 2/16 (4 overs)		Beau Webster 33 (36); Michael Neser 2/10 (3 overs)

Adelaide Strikers won by 32 runs
GMHBA Stadium, Geelong
Attendance: 18,029
Umpires: Gerard Abood and Michael Graham-Smith
Player of the match: Jake Weatherald (Adelaide Strikers)

- Melbourne Renegades won the toss and elected to field.

Match 23

7 January 2019
19:15 (D/N)
Scorecard

Hobart Hurricanes; 5/145 (20 overs)	v	Melbourne Renegades (H); 4/150 (19.2 overs)
George Bailey 70* (53); Kane Richardson 3/38 (4 overs)		Aaron Finch 42 (39); Clive Rose 1/15 (4 overs)

Melbourne Renegades won by 6 wickets
Marvel Stadium, Melbourne
Attendance: 18,584
Umpires: Simon Lightbody and Paul Wilson
Player of the match: Sam Harper (Melbourne Renegades)

- Melbourne Renegades won the toss and elected to field.

Match 26

10 January 2019
18:15 (D/N)
Scorecard

(H) Brisbane Heat; 8/144 (20 overs)	v	Melbourne Renegades; 2/145 (15.4 overs)
Brendon McCullum 50 (47); Usman Khan Shinwari 3/16 (4 overs)		Sam Harper 56* (40); Mujeeb Ur Rahman 1/23 (4 overs)

Melbourne Renegades won by 8 wickets
The Gabba, Brisbane
Attendance: 30,281
Umpires: Geoff Joshua and Simon Lightbody
Player of the match: Sam Harper (Melbourne Renegades)

- Melbourne Renegades won the toss and elected to field.

Match 29

13 January 2019
18:35 (D/N)
Scorecard

Brisbane Heat; 4/192 (20 overs)	v	Melbourne Renegades (H); 91 (17.5 overs)
Brendon McCullum 69 (43); Daniel Christian 2/24 (4 overs)		Cameron Boyce 25 (21); Brendan Doggett 3/16 (2.5 overs)

Brisbane Heat won by 101 runs
GMHBA Stadium, Geelong
Attendance: 16,008
Umpires: Shawn Craig and Phillip Gillespie
Player of the match: Max Bryant (Brisbane Heat)

- Melbourne Renegades won the toss and elected to field.

Match 32

16 January 2019
19:15 (D/N)
Scorecard

(H) Sydney Sixers; 9/115 (20 overs)	v	Melbourne Renegades; 3/116 (13 overs)
Tom Curran 44 (30); Mohammad Nabi 4/25 (4 overs)		Tom Cooper 49 (33); Steve O'Keefe 2/23 (3 overs)

Melbourne Renegades won by 7 wickets
Sydney Cricket Ground, Sydney
Attendance: 16,281
Umpires: Greg Davidson and Phillip Gillespie
Player of the match: Kane Richardson (Melbourne Renegades)

- Melbourne Renegades won the toss and elected to field.

Match 35

19 January 2019
18:45 (D/N)
Scorecard

(H) Melbourne Renegades; 121 (19.3 overs)	v	Melbourne Stars; 4/124 (19.2 overs)
Mohammad Nabi 28 (33); Marcus Stoinis 3/19 (4 overs)		Marcus Stoinis 70* (65); Kane Richardson 2/17 (4 overs)

Melbourne Stars won by 6 wickets
Marvel Stadium, Melbourne
Attendance: 38,117
Umpires: Phillip Gillespie and Geoff Joshua
Player of the match: Marcus Stoinis (Melbourne Stars)

- Melbourne Stars won the toss and elected to field.

Match 38

22 January 2019
19:15 (D/N)
Scorecard

Melbourne Renegades; 9/152 (20 overs)	v	Sydney Thunder (H); 5/140 (20 overs)
Aaron Finch 54 (38); Gurinder Sandhu 3/23 (4 overs)		Jason Sangha 54* (49); Harry Gurney 2/27 (4 overs)

Melbourne Renegades won by 12 runs
Spotless Stadium, Sydney
Attendance: 10,332
Umpires: Shawn Craig and Greg Davidson
Player of the match: Harry Gurney (Melbourne Renegades)

- Sydney Thunder won the toss and elected to field.

Match 43

28 January 2019
18:15 (D/N)
Scorecard

Melbourne Renegades; 5/157 (20 overs)	v	Perth Scorchers (H); 79 (16 overs)
Mackenzie Harvey 38 (32); Matthew Kelly 2/30 (4 overs)		Nick Hobson 19 (18); Daniel Christian 4/20 (3 overs)

Melbourne Renegades won by 78 runs
Optus Stadium, Perth
Attendance: 21,698
Umpires: Shawn Craig and Paul Wilson
Player of the match: Chris Tremain (Melbourne Renegades)

- Perth Scorchers won the toss and elected to field.

Match 46

30 January 2019
19:15 (D/N)
Scorecard

(H) Melbourne Renegades; 7/140 (20 overs)	v	Sydney Thunder; 113 (19.1 overs)
Cameron Boyce 51* (22); Jonathan Cook 2/18 (3 overs)		Baxter Holt 37 (28); Kane Richardson 3/27 (4 overs)

Melbourne Renegades won by 27 runs
Marvel Stadium, Melbourne
Attendance: 10,287
Umpires: Phillip Gillespie and Geoff Joshua
Player of the match: Cameron Boyce (Melbourne Renegades)

- Melbourne Renegades won the toss and elected to bat.
- Baxter Holt (Sydney Thunder) made his T20 debut.

Match 52

7 February 2019
19:40 (D/N)
Scorecard

(H) Hobart Hurricanes; 6/183 (20 overs)	v	Melbourne Renegades; 8/167 (20 overs)
Matthew Wade 58 (30); Harry Gurney 2/40 (4 overs)		Tom Cooper 44 (34); Jofra Archer 2/19 (4 overs)

Hobart Hurricanes won by 16 runs
Blundstone Arena, Hobart
Attendance: 8,235
Umpires: Shawn Craig and Geoff Joshua
Player of the match: Matthew Wade (Hobart Hurricanes)

- Melbourne Renegades won the toss and elected to field.

=== Knockout phase ===
Semi-final

15 February 2019
19:40 (D/N)
Scorecard

Sydney Sixers; 3/180 (20 overs)	v	Melbourne Renegades (H); 7/184 (19.5 overs)
Josh Philippe 52 (31); Cameron Boyce 2/33 (4 overs)		Aaron Finch 44 (41); Steve O'Keefe 2/22 (4 overs)

Melbourne Renegades won by 3 wickets
Marvel Stadium, Melbourne
Attendance: 15,342
Umpires: Gerard Abood and Phillip Gillespie
Player of the match: Daniel Christian (Melbourne Renegades)

- Melbourne Renegades won the toss and elected to field.

Final

17 February 2019
14:45
Scorecard

(H) Melbourne Renegades; 5/145 (20 overs)	v	Melbourne Stars; 7/132 (20 overs)
Tom Cooper 43* (35); Adam Zampa 2/21 (4 overs)		Ben Dunk 57 (45); Chris Tremain 2/21 (4 overs)

Melbourne Renegades won by 13 runs
Marvel Stadium, Melbourne
Attendance: 40,816
Umpires: Gerard Abood and Sam Nogajski
Player of the match: Dan Christian (Melbourne Renegades)

- Melbourne Stars won the toss and elected to field.

== Ladder ==
Pos	Team	Pld	W	L	NR	Pts	NRR	Qualification
1	Hobart Hurricanes	14	10	4	0	20	0.603	Advanced to semi-finals
2	Melbourne Renegades (C)	14	8	6	0	16	0.173	Advanced to semi-finals
3	Sydney Sixers	14	8	6	0	16	0.047	Advanced to semi-finals
4	Melbourne Stars	14	7	7	0	14	−0.062	Advanced to semi-finals
5	Brisbane Heat	14	6	7	1	13	0.249	
6	Sydney Thunder	14	6	7	1	13	0.000	
7	Adelaide Strikers	14	6	8	0	12	−0.473	
8	Perth Scorchers	14	4	10	0	8	−0.502	

(C) Champions

== Squad information ==
The following is the Renegades men squad for the 2018–19 Big Bash League season as of 28 December 2018.

S/N	Name	Nationality	Date of birth (age)	Batting style	Bowling style	Notes
Batsmen
5	Aaron Finch	Australia	17 November 1986 (age 38)	Right-handed	Left arm orthodox	Captain
26	Tom Cooper	Netherlands	26 November 1986 (age 38)	Right-handed	Right arm off spin	Australian passport, vice captain
7	Cameron White	Australia	18 August 1983 (age 41)	Right-handed	Right arm leg break	
21	Marcus Harris	Australia	21 July 1992 (age 32)	Left-handed	–	
20	Beau Webster	Australia	1 December 1993 (age 31)	Right-handed	Right arm off break	
19	Kelvin Smith	Australia	5 September 1994 (age 30)	Left-handed	Right arm off spin	
All-rounders
10	Jack Wildermuth	Australia	21 December 1993 (age 31)	Right-handed	Right arm medium	
12	Will Sutherland	Australia	27 October 1999 (age 25)	Right-handed	Right arm fast medium	
77	Mohammad Nabi	Afghanistan	1 January 1985 (age 40)	Right-handed	Right arm off break	Visa contract
3	Mackenzie Harvey	Australia	18 September 2000 (age 24)	Left-handed	Right arm fast medium	Replacement player for Aaron Finch
54	Daniel Christian	Australia	4 May 1983 (age 41)	Right-handed	Right arm fast medium	Vice captain
23	Jake Fraser-McGurk	Australia	11 April 2002 (age 22)	Right-handed	Right arm leg break	Replacement player for Zak Evans
Wicketkeepers
15	Tim Ludeman	Australia	23 June 1987 (age 37)	Right-handed	–	
6	Sam Harper	Australia	10 December 1996 (age 28)	Right-handed	–	
Pace bowlers
34	Chris Tremain	Australia	10 August 1991 (age 33)	Right-handed	Right arm fast medium	
55	Kane Richardson	Australia	12 February 1991 (age 34)	Right-handed	Right arm fast medium	
16	Joe Mennie	Australia	24 December 1988 (age 36)	Right-handed	Right arm fast medium	
2	Zak Evans	Australia	26 March 2000 (age 24)	Right-handed	Right arm fast	
11	Harry Gurney	England	25 October 1986 (age 38)	Right-handed	Left arm fast	Visa contract, replacement player for Usman Khan Shinwari
14	Usman Khan Shinwari	Pakistan	1 May 1994 (age 30)	Right-handed	Left arm fast	Visa contract
17	Andrew Fekete	Australia	18 May 1985 (age 39)	Right-handed	Right-arm fast	Replacement player for Will Sutherland
–	Mitchell Perry	Australia	27 April 2000 (age 24)	Left-handed	Right arm fast medium	
Spin bowlers
18	Jon Holland	Australia	29 May 1987 (age 37)	Right-handed	Left-arm orthodox spin	
13	Cameron Boyce	Australia	27 July 1989 (age 35)	Right-handed	Leg spin	

== Season statistics ==
=== Home attendance ===
Match	Opponent	Attendance
2	Perth Scorchers	15,011
12	Sydney Sixers	23,129
18	Adelaide Strikers	18,029
23	Hobart Hurricanes	18,584
29	Brisbane Heat	16,008
35	Melbourne Stars	38,117
46	Sydney Thunder	10,287
SF	Sydney Sixers	15,342
GF	Melbourne Stars	40,816
Total Attendance		195,323
Average Attendance		21,703
