= 2019–20 Melbourne Renegades season =

Melbourne Renegades
2019–20 season
- Coach: Michael Klinger
- Captain(s): Aaron Finch
- Home ground: Marvel Stadium (Capacity: 47,000); GMHBA Stadium (Capacity: 36,000)
- BBL Season: 8th
- BBL Finals: DNQ
- Leading Run Scorer: Shaun Marsh (449)
- Leading Wicket Taker: Cameron Boyce (14)
- Player of the Season: Beau Webster
- Highest home attendance: 30,388 vs Melbourne Stars (10 January 2020)
- Lowest home attendance: 8,421 vs Sydney Thunder (19 December 2019)
- Average home attendance: 15,528

The 2019–20 Melbourne Renegades season was the ninth in the club's history. Coached by Michael Klinger and captained by Aaron Finch, they competed in the BBL's 2019–20 season.

== Standings ==
| Pos | Team | Pld | W | L | NR | Pts | NRR | Qualification |
|---|---|---|---|---|---|---|---|---|
| 1 | Melbourne Stars | 14 | 10 | 4 | 0 | 20 | 0.526 | Advanced to play-off phase |
| 2 | Sydney Sixers (C) | 14 | 9 | 4 | 1 | 19 | 0.269 | Advanced to play-off phase |
| 3 | Adelaide Strikers | 14 | 8 | 5 | 1 | 17 | 0.564 | Advanced to play-off phase |
| 4 | Hobart Hurricanes | 14 | 6 | 7 | 1 | 13 | −0.355 | Advanced to play-off phase |
| 5 | Sydney Thunder | 14 | 6 | 7 | 1 | 13 | −0.446 | Advanced to play-off phase |
| 6 | Perth Scorchers | 14 | 6 | 8 | 0 | 12 | −0.023 | |
| 7 | Brisbane Heat | 14 | 6 | 8 | 0 | 12 | −0.237 | |
| 8 | Melbourne Renegades | 14 | 3 | 11 | 0 | 6 | −0.348 | |

(C) Champions

== Fixtures and results ==
Match 3

19 December 2019
19:10 (D/N)
Scorecard

| (H) Melbourne Renegades; 5/169 (20 overs) | v | Sydney Thunder; 4/171 (19.4 overs) |
| Shaun Marsh 42 (33); Daniel Sams 2/26 (3 overs) | | Alex Hales 68 (38); Harry Gurney 2/26 (4 overs) |

Sydney Thunder won by 6 wickets
GMHBA Stadium, Geelong
Attendance: 8,421
Umpires: Greg Davidson and Donovan Koch
Player of the match: Alex Hales (Sydney Thunder)

- Melbourne Renegades won the toss and elected to bat.

Match 7

21 December 2019
21:10 (D/N)
Scorecard

| (H) Perth Scorchers; 7/196 (20 overs) | v | Melbourne Renegades; 6/185 (20 overs) |
| Mitchell Marsh 56* (22); Kane Richardson 4/22 (4 overs) | | Beau Webster 67* (37); Fawad Ahmed 2/22 (4 overs) |

Perth Scorchers won by 11 runs
Optus Stadium, Perth
Attendance: 23,869
Umpires: Gerard Abood and Shawn Craig
Player of the match: Mitchell Marsh (Perth Scorchers)

- Melbourne Renegades won the toss and elected to field.

Match 11

24 December 2019
14:45
Scorecard

| Melbourne Renegades; 147 (19.1 overs) | v | Hobart Hurricanes (H); 3/151 (19.1 overs) |
| Aaron Finch 50 (37); Nathan Ellis 3/15 (3 overs) | | D'Arcy Short 60 (45); Tom Cooper 2/32 (4 overs) |

Hobart Hurricanes won by 7 wickets
Blundstone Arena, Hobart
Attendance: 8,865
Umpires: Michael Graham-Smith and Sam Nogajski
Player of the match: Riley Meredith (Hobart Hurricanes)

- Melbourne Renegades won the toss and elected to bat.

Match 15

29 December 2019
19:10 (D/N)
Scorecard

| Adelaide Strikers; 6/155 (20 overs) | v | Melbourne Renegades (H); 8/137 (20 overs) |
| Phil Salt 54 (26); Kane Richardson 4/33 (4 overs) | | Aaron Finch 50 (39); Rashid Khan 2/15 (4 overs) |

Adelaide Strikers won by 18 runs
Marvel Stadium, Melbourne
Attendance: 20,089
Umpires: Greg Davidson and Donovan Koch
Player of the match: Rashid Khan (Adelaide Strikers)

- Adelaide Strikers won the toss and elected to bat.

Match 20

2 January 2020
19:10 (D/N)
Scorecard

| (H) Melbourne Renegades; 6/153 (20 overs) | v | Sydney Sixers; 4/154 (19.5 overs) |
| Sam Harper 45 (24); Lloyd Pope 2/22 (4 overs) | | James Vince 41 (26); Tom Andrews 2/22 (3 overs) |

Sydney Sixers won by 6 wickets
Marvel Stadium, Melbourne
Attendance: 11,903
Umpires: Simon Fry and John Ward
Player of the match: James Vince (Sydney Sixers)

- Melbourne Renegades won the toss and elected to bat.

Match 22

4 January 2020
18:40 (D/N)
Scorecard

| Melbourne Renegades; 9/142 (20 overs) | v | Melbourne Stars (H); 2/143 (18.5 overs) |
| Shaun Marsh 43 (33); Sandeep Lamichhane 3/26 (4 overs) | | Marcus Stoinis 68* (55); Kane Richardson 1/34 (4 overs) |

Melbourne Stars won by 8 wickets
Melbourne Cricket Ground, Melbourne
Attendance: 54,478
Umpires: Gerard Abood and Phillip Gillespie
Player of the match: Adam Zampa (Melbourne Stars)

- Melbourne Stars won the toss and elected to field.

Match 26

7 January 2020
19:10 (D/N)
Scorecard

| (H) Melbourne Renegades; 5/175 (20 overs) | v | Perth Scorchers; 4/178 (19 overs) |
| Sam Harper 73 (46); Jhye Richardson 3/22 (4 overs) | | Liam Livingstone 59 (39); Richard Gleeson 3/35 (4 overs) |

Perth Scorchers won by 6 wickets
GMHBA Stadium, Geelong
Attendance: 11,568
Umpires: Nathan Johnstone and Paul Wilson
Player of the match: Liam Livingstone (Perth Scorchers)

- Perth Scorchers won the toss and elected to field.

Match 30

10 January 2020
19:10 (D/N)
Scorecard

| (H) Melbourne Renegades; 7/168 (20 overs) | v | Melbourne Stars; 3/169 (18.4 overs) |
| Shaun Marsh 63 (43); Nathan Coulter-Nile 2/29 (4 overs) | | Glenn Maxwell 83* (45); Samit Patel 1/21 (4 overs) |

Melbourne Stars won by 7 wickets
Marvel Stadium, Melbourne
Attendance: 30,388
Umpires: Simon Fry and Michael Graham-Smith
Player of the match: Glenn Maxwell (Melbourne Stars)

- Melbourne Stars won the toss and elected to field.
- Lance Morris (Melbourne Stars) made his T20 debut.

Match 33

12 January 2020
15:40
Scorecard

| (H) Adelaide Strikers; 6/173 (20 overs) | v | Melbourne Renegades; 110 (17.4 overs) |
| Jonathan Wells 58 (38); Cameron Boyce 1/22 (4 overs) | | Beau Webster 49 (33); Peter Siddle 3/14 (3 overs) |

Adelaide Strikers won by 63 runs
Adelaide Oval, Adelaide
Attendance: 28,271
Umpires: Gerard Abood and Shawn Craig
Player of the match: Jonathan Wells (Adelaide Strikers)

- Adelaide Strikers won the toss and elected to bat.

Match 37

15 January 2020
18:10 (D/N)
Scorecard

| Melbourne Renegades; 4/172 (20 overs) | v | Sydney Thunder (H); 7/122 (14 overs) |
| Sam Harper 52 (38); Liam Bowe 2/23 (4 overs) | | Alex Ross 51 (27); Dan Christian 3/14 (2 overs) |

Melbourne Renegades won by 12 runs (DLS method)
Manuka Oval, Canberra
Attendance: 9,005
Umpires: Simon Fry and Donovan Koch
Player of the match: Sam Harper (Melbourne Renegades)

- Melbourne Renegades won the toss and elected to bat.
- Sydney Thunder were given a revised target of 135 runs from 14 overs due to rain.

Match 44

19 January 2020
19:10 (D/N)
Scorecard

| Melbourne Renegades; 6/164 (20 overs) | v | Brisbane Heat (H); 120 (15 overs) |
| Beau Webster 36 (26); Ben Laughlin 3/31 (4 overs) | | Sam Heazlett 56 (37); Cameron Boyce 4/15 (4 overs) |

Melbourne Renegades won by 44 runs
The Gabba, Brisbane
Attendance: 27,524
Umpires: Greg Davidson and Simon Lightbody
Player of the match: Cameron Boyce (Melbourne Renegades)

- Brisbane Heat won the toss and elected to field.
- Brisbane Heat suffered the worst 10-wicket collapse in a BBL match, losing all ten wickets for 36 runs, including the last seven wickets for seven runs in 16 balls.

Match 47

21 January 2020
19:10 (D/N)
Scorecard

| Hobart Hurricanes; 3/190 (20 overs) | v | Melbourne Renegades (H); 4/186 (20 overs) |
| Mac Wright 70* (50); Cameron Boyce 2/27 (4 overs) | | Mohammad Nabi 63 (30); Qais Ahmad 1/25 (4 overs) |

Hobart Hurricanes won by 4 runs
Marvel Stadium, Melbourne
Attendance: 12,241
Umpires: Shawn Craig and Tony Wilds
Player of the match: Mac Wright (Hobart Hurricanes)

- Melbourne Renegades won the toss and elected to field.
- As a result of this match, Melbourne Renegades were eliminated.

Match 52

25 January 2020
15:40
Scorecard

| Melbourne Renegades; 5/175 (20 overs) | v | Sydney Sixers (H); 3/176 (18.4 overs) |
| Aaron Finch 109 (68); Tom Curran 3/27 (4 overs) | | Steve Smith 66* (40); Will Sutherland 1/24 (3.4 overs) |

Sydney Sixers won by 7 wickets
Sydney Cricket Ground, Sydney
Attendance: 23,587
Umpires: Darren Close and Paul Wilson
Player of the match: Steve Smith (Sydney Sixers)

- Sydney Sixers won the toss and elected to field.
- Nathan McSweeney and Brayden Stepien (Melbourne Renegades) both made their T20 debuts.

Match 56

27 January 2020
14:45
Scorecard

| Brisbane Heat; 7/154 (20 overs) | v | Melbourne Renegades (H); 3/155 (19.2 overs) |
| Matt Renshaw 65 (47); Will Sutherland 3/30 (3 overs) | | Aaron Finch 63* (49); Ben Cutting 2/35 (2.2 overs) |

Melbourne Renegades won by 7 wickets
Marvel Stadium, Melbourne
Attendance: 14,087
Umpires: Phillip Gillespie and Paul Wilson
Player of the match: Aaron Finch (Melbourne Renegades)

- Brisbane Heat won the toss and elected to bat.
- Zak Evans (Melbourne Renegades) made his T20 debut.

== Squad information ==
The following is the Renegades men squad for the 2019–20 Big Bash League season as of 24 January 2020.

| S/N | Name | Nationality | Date of birth (age) | Batting style | Bowling style | Notes |
Batsmen
| 5 | Aaron Finch | Australia | 17 November 1986 (age 38) | Right-handed | Slow left arm orthodox | Captain |
| 26 | Tom Cooper | Netherlands | 26 November 1986 (age 32) | Right-handed | Right arm off break | Vice captain |
| 14 | Alex Doolan | Australia | 29 November 1985 (age 39) | Right-handed | – | Injury replacement player for Zak Evans |
| 23 | Jake Fraser-McGurk | Australia | 11 April 2002 (age 22) | Right-handed | Right arm leg break | |
| 14 | Marcus Harris | Australia | 21 July 1992 (age 32) | Left-handed | Right arm off break | |
| 3 | Mackenzie Harvey | Australia | 18 September 2000 (age 24) | Left-handed | Right arm fast medium | |
| 9 | Shaun Marsh | Australia | 9 July 1983 (age 36) | Left-handed | Slow left arm orthodox | |
All-rounders
| 29 | Tom Andrews | Australia | 7 October 1994 (age 30) | Left-handed | Slow left-arm orthodox | Injury replacement player for Jon Holland |
| 41 | Faheem Ashraf | Pakistan | 16 January 1994 (age 31) | Left-handed | Right-arm medium-fast | Visa contract, didn't make an appearance due to national team call-up |
| 54 | Daniel Christian | Australia | 4 May 1983 (age 41) | Right-handed | Right arm fast medium | Vice captain |
| 77 | Mohammad Nabi | Afghanistan | 1 January 1985 (age 34) | Right-handed | Right arm off break | Visa contract, replacement player for Richard Gleeson |
| 10 | Jack Wildermuth | Australia | 1 September 1993 (age 26) | Right-handed | Right arm fast medium | |
| 20 | Beau Webster | Australia | 1 December 1993 (age 25) | Right-handed | Right arm off break | |
| 12 | Will Sutherland | Australia | 27 October 1999 (age 25) | Right-handed | Right arm fast medium | |
| 48 | Samit Patel | England | 30 November 1984 (age 40) | Right-handed | Slow left-arm orthodox | Visa contract, injury replacement player for Harry Gurney |
| 38 | Nathan McSweeney | Australia | 8 March 1999 (age 26) | Right-handed | Right-arm offbreak | Replacement player for Kane Richardson |
Wicketkeepers
| 6 | Sam Harper | Australia | 10 December 1996 (age 28) | Right-handed | – | |
| 4 | Brayden Stepien | Australia | 27 July 1997 (age 27) | Right-handed | Right-arm medium | Injury replacement player for Sam Harper |
Pace bowlers
| 2 | Zak Evans | Australia | 26 March 2000 (age 19) | Right-handed | Right-arm fast | |
| 16 | Joe Mennie | Australia | 24 December 1988 (age 36) | Right-handed | Right arm fast medium | |
| 33 | Richard Gleeson | England | 2 December 1987 (age 37) | Right-handed | Right arm fast medium | Visa contract |
| 11 | Harry Gurney | England | 25 October 1986 (age 38) | Right-handed | Left arm fast medium | Visa contract |
| 55 | Kane Richardson | Australia | 12 February 1991 (age 34) | Right-handed | Right arm fast medium | |
| 17 | Andrew Fekete | Australia | 18 May 1985 (age 39) | Right-handed | Right arm fast medium | Replacement player for Mackenzie Harvey |
| – | Luke Robins | Australia | 18 May 1994 (age 30) | Right-handed | Right-arm fast-medium | Replacement player for Aaron Finch |
| 36 | Usman Khan Shinwari | Pakistan | 1 May 1994 (age 30) | Right-handed | Left arm fast | Visa contract, didn't make an appearance due to national team call-up |
Spin bowlers
| 13 | Cameron Boyce | Australia | 27 July 1989 (age 35) | Right-handed | Right arm leg break | |
| 18 | Jon Holland | Australia | 29 May 1987 (age 32) | Right-handed | Slow left arm orthodox | |

== Season statistics ==
=== Home attendance ===
| Match No. | Opponent | Attendance |
|---|---|---|
| 3 | Sydney Thunder | 8,421 |
| 15 | Adelaide Strikers | 20,089 |
| 20 | Sydney Sixers | 11,903 |
| 26 | Perth Scorchers | 11,568 |
| 30 | Melbourne Stars | 30,388 |
| 47 | Hobart Hurricanes | 12,241 |
| 56 | Brisbane Heat | 14,087 |
| Total Attendance | | 108,697 |
| Average Attendance | | 15,528 |
