= List of Sydney Sixers cricketers =

The Sydney Sixers is an Australian cricket club who play in the Big Bash League, the national domestic Twenty20 competition. Along with cross-town rivals, Sydney Thunder, the club was established in 2011 as an inaugural member of the eight-club league. The Big Bash League consists of a regular season and a finals series of the top four teams. The two "Big finalists" earn the right to compete in the international Twenty20 tournament called the Champions League Twenty20 (CLT20). This list includes players who have played at least one match for the Sixers in the Big Bash League and the Champions League Twenty20.

== List of players ==
Correct as of 25 January 2026.

Players are listed according to the date of their debut for the Sixers. All statistics are for Big Bash League and Champions League Twenty20 only.

The number to the left of player name represents 'cap'. For players who debuted for the club in the same match, player caps are ordered by that of the batting order.

In the category "Debut", games are listed as Tournament/Round. e.g. BBL03/SF would equate to 2013–14 Big Bash League, Semi-final.

Hover over column headings for key.

Sydney Sixers players
	Player	Nat	Seasons	Debut	Mat	
1	Brad Haddin	(Australia)	2011–2013	BBL01/1	15	
2	Michael Lumb	(England)	2011–2014	BBL01/1	35	
3	Nic Maddinson	(Australia)	2011–2018	BBL01/1	61	
4	Steve Smith	(Australia)	2011–2013, 2015, 2022–2026	BBL01/1	40	
5	Moises Henriques	(Australia)	2011–2026	BBL01/1	150	
6	Ed Cowan	(Australia)	2011–2012, 2014	BBL01/1	3	
7	Josh Hazlewood	(Australia)	2011–2016, 2025–2026	BBL01/1	—	
8	Brett Lee	(Australia)	2011–2015	BBL01/1	36	
9	Dwayne Bravo	(Trinidad and Tobago)	2011–2012	BBL01/1	4	
10	Mitchell Starc	(Australia)	2011–2015, 2025–2026	BBL01/1	—	
11	Stuart MacGill	(Australia)	2011–2012	BBL01/1	8	
12	Peter Nevill	(Australia)	2011–2012	BBL01/2	8	
13	Dominic Thornely	(Australia)	2011–2013	BBL01/2	15	
14	Ben Rohrer	(Australia)	2011–2012	BBL01/3	11	
15	Ian Moran	(Australia)	2011–2012	BBL01/5	5	
16	Nathan McCullum	(New Zealand)	2011–2012	BBL01/6	6	
17	Stephen O'Keefe	(Australia)	2011–2019	BBL01/6	—	
18	Shane Watson	(Australia)	2011–2012	2012 CLT20/1	3	
19	Pat Cummins	(Australia)	2011–2012	2012 CLT20/1	6	
20	David Warner	(Australia)	2012–2013	BBL02/1	1	
21	Jeevan Mendis	(Sri Lanka)	2012–2013	BBL02/1	4	
22	Luke Feldman	(Australia)	2012–2014	BBL02/1	8	
23	Sunil Narine	(Trinidad and Tobago)	2012–2013	BBL02/2	5	
24	Daniel Smith	(Australia)	2012–2014	BBL02/3	13	
25	Josh Lalor	(Australia)	2012–2014	BBL02/4	6	
26	Daniel Hughes	(Australia)	2012–2025	BBL02/5	100	
27	Kurtis Patterson	(Australia)	2012–2013	BBL02/5	1	
28	Sachithra Senanayake	(Sri Lanka)	2012–2013	BBL02/7	2	
29	Mark Cosgrove	(Australia)	2013–2014	BBL03/1	3	
30	Ravi Bopara	(England)	2013–2014	BBL03/1	5	
31	Jordan Silk	(Australia)	2013–2026	BBL03/1	—	
32	Marcus North	(Australia)	2013–2014	BBL03/2	8	
33	Chris Tremlett	(England)	2013–2014	BBL03/5	1	
34	Nathan Lyon	(Australia)	2013–2025	BBL03/6	34	
35	Sean Abbott	(Australia)	2013–2026	BBL03/8	—	
36	Trent Copeland	(Australia)	2013–2014	BBL03/SF	1	
37	Ryan Carters	(Australia)	2014–2017	BBL04/1	10	
38	Ben Dwarshuis	(Australia)	2014–2026	BBL04/1	—	
39	Luke Doran	(Australia)	2014–2015	BBL04/1	4	
40	Doug Bollinger	(Australia)	2014–2016	BBL04/1	10	
41	Riki Wessels	(England)	2014–2015	BBL04/2	9	
42	Simon Keen	(Australia)	2014–2015	BBL04/6	1	
43	Jack Edwards	(Australia)	2018–2026	BBL08/1	—	
44	Josh Philippe	(Australia)	2018–2026	BBL08/1	100	
45	Tom Curran	(England)	2018–2024	BBL08/1	32	
46	James Vince	(England)	2019–2025	BBL09/1	73	
47	Dan Christian	(Australia)	2020–2023	BBL10/1	47	
48	Hayden Kerr	(Australia)	2021–2026	BBL11/1	—	
49	Todd Murphy	(Australia)	2022–2025	BBL12/1	—	
50	Joel Davies	(Australia)	2023–2026	BBL13/1	—	
51	Ben Manenti	(Australia)	2023–2025	BBL13/1	—	
52	Lachlan Shaw	(Australia)	2024–2026	BBL14/1	—	
53	Mitch Perry	(Australia)	2024–2026	BBL14/1	—	
54	Jafer Chohan	(England)	2024–2026	BBL14/1	—	
55	Babar Azam	(Pakistan)	2025	BBL15/1	—	—
56	Mitchell Starc	(Australia)	2025–2026	BBL15/1	—	
57	Ben Manenti	(Australia)	2025	BBL15/1	—	

Sources: Sydney Sixers official player and statistics pages; Cricket Australia; Cricinfo. Historical figures are retained from the original table where verified; later figures should be cross-checked against the relevant BBL scorecards before publication.

== See also ==
- Sydney Sixers
- Big Bash League
- Champions League Twenty20
