= 2018–19 Big Bash League season =

Cricket tournament

2018–19 Big Bash League
- Dates: 19 December 2018 – 17 February 2019
- Administrator: Cricket Australia
- Cricket format: Twenty20
- Tournament format(s): Double round robin and knockout
- Champions: Melbourne Renegades (1st title)
- Participants: 8
- Matches: 59
- Attendance: 1,212,596 (20,552 per match)
- Player of the series: D'Arcy Short (Hobart Hurricanes)
- Most runs: D'Arcy Short (Hobart Hurricanes) (637)
- Most wickets: Kane Richardson (Melbourne Renegades) (24)
- Official website: bigbash.com.au

The 2018–19 Big Bash League season or BBL|08 was the eighth season of the KFC Big Bash League, the professional men's Twenty20 domestic cricket competition in Australia. The tournament started on 19 December 2018. Adelaide Strikers were the defending champions. The competition was extended to a full home and away season for the first time, with each team playing each other twice at both a home venue and away venue. For this season of the tournament, the toss was replaced by a bat flip, with "roofs and flats" used instead of heads or tails.

The season saw Cameron Bancroft's return to professional cricket, following his involvement in the ball-tampering scandal in March 2018.

The title was won by Melbourne Renegades, who defeated Melbourne Stars at the Marvel Stadium.

== Teams ==
| Team | Home Ground | Capacity | Captain | Coach |
|---|---|---|---|---|
| Adelaide Strikers | Adelaide Oval; Traeger Park | 53,583; 10,000 | Travis Head | Jason Gillespie |
| Brisbane Heat | The Gabba; Metricon Stadium | 42,000; 25,000 | Chris Lynn | Daniel Vettori |
| Hobart Hurricanes | Blundstone Arena; UTAS Stadium | 19,500; 15,500 | Matthew Wade | Adam Griffith |
| Melbourne Renegades | Marvel Stadium; GMHBA Stadium | 48,003; 34,000 | Aaron Finch | Andrew McDonald |
| Melbourne Stars | Melbourne Cricket Ground; Metricon Stadium; Ted Summerton Reserve | 100,024; 25,000; 7,500 | Glenn Maxwell | Stephen Fleming |
| Perth Scorchers | Optus Stadium | 60,000 | Mitchell Marsh | Adam Voges |
| Sydney Sixers | Sydney Cricket Ground | 48,000 | Moises Henriques | Greg Shipperd |
| Sydney Thunder | Spotless Stadium; Manuka Oval | 22,000; 12,000 | Shane Watson | Shane Bond |

== Venues ==
| Adelaide | Alice Springs | Brisbane | Canberra | Geelong |
|---|---|---|---|---|
| Adelaide Oval | Traeger Park | The Gabba | Manuka Oval | GMHBA Stadium |
| Capacity: 53,583 | Capacity: 7,200 | Capacity: 42,000 | Capacity: 12,000 | Capacity: 34,000 |
| Matches: 7 | Matches: 1 | Matches: 5 | Matches: 2 | Matches: 2 |
| Hobart | 2018–19 Big Bash League season is located in Australia | | | Gold Coast |
| Blundstone Arena | 2018–19 Big Bash League season is located in Australia | | | Metricon Stadium |
| Capacity: 19,500 | 2018–19 Big Bash League season is located in Australia | | | Capacity: 25,000 |
| Matches: 5 + 1 final | 2018–19 Big Bash League season is located in Australia | | | Matches: 3 |
| Perth | 2018–19 Big Bash League season is located in Australia | | | Launceston |
| Optus Stadium | 2018–19 Big Bash League season is located in Australia | | | University of Tasmania Stadium |
| Capacity: 60,000 | 2018–19 Big Bash League season is located in Australia | | | Capacity: 15,500 |
| Matches: 7 | 2018–19 Big Bash League season is located in Australia | | | Matches: 2 |
| | 2018–19 Big Bash League season is located in Australia | | | A small stand to the left and a two tier stand and scoreboard filled with people in the backdrop of an oval grass playing surface scattered with players. Spectators stand in the foreground. |
| Moe | Melbourne | | Sydney | |
| Ted Summerton Reserve | Marvel Stadium | Melbourne Cricket Ground | Spotless Stadium | Sydney Cricket Ground |
| Capacity: 7,500 | Capacity: 48,003 | Capacity: 100,024 | Capacity: 22,000 | Capacity: 48,000 |
| Matches: 1 | Matches: 5 + 2 final | Matches: 5 | Matches: 5 | Matches: 7 |

== League stage ==
=== Points table ===
| Pos | Team | Pld | W | L | NR | Pts | NRR | Qualification |
|---|---|---|---|---|---|---|---|---|
| 1 | Hobart Hurricanes | 14 | 10 | 4 | 0 | 20 | 0.603 | Advanced to semi-finals |
| 2 | Melbourne Renegades (C) | 14 | 8 | 6 | 0 | 16 | 0.173 | Advanced to semi-finals |
| 3 | Sydney Sixers | 14 | 8 | 6 | 0 | 16 | 0.047 | Advanced to semi-finals |
| 4 | Melbourne Stars | 14 | 7 | 7 | 0 | 14 | −0.062 | Advanced to semi-finals |
| 5 | Brisbane Heat | 14 | 6 | 7 | 1 | 13 | 0.249 | |
| 6 | Sydney Thunder | 14 | 6 | 7 | 1 | 13 | 0.000 | |
| 7 | Adelaide Strikers | 14 | 6 | 8 | 0 | 12 | −0.473 | |
| 8 | Perth Scorchers | 14 | 4 | 10 | 0 | 8 | −0.502 | |

(C) Champions

=== Matches ===
19 December 2018
18:15 (D/N)
Scorecard

| (H) Brisbane Heat; 146 (19.4 overs) | v | Adelaide Strikers; 5/147 (19.1 overs) |
| Chris Lynn 33 (20); Rashid Khan 3/19 (4 overs) | | Alex Carey 70 (46); James Pattinson 2/23 (4 overs) |

Adelaide Strikers won by 5 wickets
The Gabba, Brisbane
Attendance: 26,932
Umpires: Simon Fry and Paul Wilson
Player of the match: Rashid Khan (Adelaide Strikers)

- Adelaide Strikers won the toss and elected to field.
- Max Bryant (Brisbane Heat) made his T20 debut.
- Mujeeb Ur Rahman (Brisbane Heat) made 27 runs, the highest score by a number 11 batsman in T20's and in the history of BBL.
- Jimmy Peirson and Mujeeb Ur Rahman (Brisbane Heat) made the highest last wicket partnership (of 45) in the history of BBL.

20 December 2018
19:15 (D/N)
Scorecard

| Perth Scorchers; 103 (19 overs) | v | Melbourne Renegades (H); 6/107 (15.2 overs) |
| Michael Klinger 28 (32); Dan Christian 3/22 (3 overs) | | Sam Harper 36 (25); Jason Behrendorff 2/17 (4 overs) |

Melbourne Renegades won by 4 wickets
Marvel Stadium, Melbourne
Attendance: 15,011
Umpires: Gerard Abood and Sam Nogajski
Player of the match: Usman Shinwari (Melbourne Renegades)

- Melbourne Renegades won the toss and elected to field.
- Will Sutherland (Melbourne Renegades) made his T20 debut.

21 December 2018
19:15 (D/N)
Scorecard

| (H) Sydney Thunder; 5/181 (20 overs) | v | Melbourne Stars; 6/74 (8 overs) |
| Jason Sangha 63* (36); Adam Zampa 2/23 (4 overs) | | Nick Larkin 28* (13); Daniel Sams 3/5 (2 overs) |

Sydney Thunder won by 15 runs (D/L method)
Manuka Oval, Canberra
Attendance: 8,788
Umpires: Simon Lightbody and Tony Wilds
Player of the match: Daniel Sams (Sydney Thunder)

- Melbourne Stars won the toss and elected to field.
- Melbourne Stars were set a target of 90 runs from 8 overs due to rain.
- Travis Dean (Melbourne Stars) made his T20 debut.

22 December 2018
15:30
Scorecard

| (H) Sydney Sixers; 4/164 (20 overs) | v | Perth Scorchers; 8/147 (20 overs) |
| Jordan Silk 67* (49); Jason Behrendorff 2/28 (4 overs) | | Hilton Cartwright 53 (40); Steve O'Keefe 3/19 (4 overs) |

Sydney Sixers won by 17 runs
Sydney Cricket Ground, Sydney
Attendance: 17,436
Umpires: Greg Davidson and Michael Graham-Smith
Player of the match: Steve O'Keefe (Sydney Sixers)

- Sydney Sixers won the toss and elected to bat.
- Jack Edwards and Lloyd Pope (Sydney Sixers) both made their T20 debuts.

22 December 2018
18:00 (D/N)
Scorecard

| Hobart Hurricanes; 6/159 (19 overs) | v | Brisbane Heat (H); 144 (18.4 overs) |
| D'Arcy Short 67 (52); Mujeeb Ur Rahman 2/23 (4 overs) | | Ben Cutting 58 (32); James Faulkner 3/25 (3.4 overs) |

Hobart Hurricanes won by 15 runs
Metricon Stadium, Gold Coast
Attendance: 12,791
Umpires: Phillip Gillespie and John Ward
Player of the match: D'Arcy Short (Hobart Hurricanes)

- Brisbane Heat won the toss and elected to field.
- Match was reduced to 19 overs per side due to rain.

23 December 2018
18:45 (D/N)
Scorecard

| (H) Adelaide Strikers; 5/174 (20 overs) | v | Melbourne Renegades; 5/176 (19.1 overs) |
| Matthew Short 65 (41); Kane Richardson 2/39 (4 overs) | | Dan Christian 49* (27); Rashid Khan 2/13 (4 overs) |

Melbourne Renegades won by 5 wickets
Adelaide Oval, Adelaide
Attendance: 34,214
Umpires: Simon Fry and Geoff Joshua
Player of the match: Dan Christian (Melbourne Renegades)

- Melbourne Renegades won the toss and elected to field.
- Cameron Valente (Adelaide Strikers) made his T20 debut.

24 December 2018
15:45
Scorecard

| Melbourne Stars; 5/155 (20 overs) | v | Hobart Hurricanes (H); 4/156 (18.4 overs) |
| Glenn Maxwell 47 (31); Jofra Archer 3/25 (4 overs) | | Matthew Wade 52 (37); Sandeep Lamichhane 3/24 (4 overs) |

Hobart Hurricanes won by 6 wickets
Blundstone Arena, Hobart
Attendance: 9,132
Umpires: Shawn Craig and Sam Nogajski
Player of the match: D'Arcy Short (Hobart Hurricanes)

- Hobart Hurricanes won the toss and elected to field.

24 December 2018
19:15 (D/N)
Scorecard

| (H) Sydney Thunder; 9/169 (20 overs) | v | Sydney Sixers; 9/148 (20 overs) |
| Jos Buttler 63 (37); Tom Curran 3/24 (4 overs) | | Tom Curran 62 (40); Daniel Sams 3/30 (4 overs) |

Sydney Thunder won by 21 runs
Spotless Stadium, Sydney
Attendance: 10,508
Umpires: Gerard Abood and Tony Wilds
Player of the match: Jos Buttler (Sydney Thunder)

- Sydney Sixers won the toss and elected to field.
- Jonathan Cook (Sydney Thunder) made his T20 debut.

26 December 2018
16:15
Scorecard

| Adelaide Strikers; 88 (17.2 overs) | v | Perth Scorchers (H); 3/92 (18 overs) |
| Jake Weatherald 22 (17); Jhye Richardson 3/7 (3 overs) | | Will Bosisto 36* (34); Cameron Valente 1/16 (2 overs) |

Perth Scorchers won by 7 wickets
Optus Stadium, Perth
Attendance: 40,646
Umpires: Phillip Gillespie and Geoff Joshua
Player of the match: Jhye Richardson (Perth Scorchers)

- Perth Scorchers won the toss and elected to field.

27 December 2018
19:15 (D/N)
Scorecard

| (H) Sydney Sixers; 9/130 (20 overs) | v | Melbourne Stars; 5/132 (14.5 overs) |
| Jordan Silk 41* (37); Jackson Coleman 3/18 (3 overs) | | Peter Handscomb 70 (35); Ben Dwarshuis 3/26 (3.5 overs) |

Melbourne Stars won by 5 wickets
Sydney Cricket Ground, Sydney
Attendance: 22,221
Umpires: Shawn Craig and Simon Lightbody
Player of the match: Peter Handscomb (Melbourne Stars)

- Melbourne Stars won the toss and elected to field.

28 December 2018
19:15 (D/N)
Scorecard

| Sydney Thunder; 6/193 (20 overs) | v | Hobart Hurricanes (H); 3/196 (19.1 overs) |
| Jos Buttler 89 (54); Clive Rose 2/30 (4 overs) | | Matthew Wade 85 (49); Sam Rainbird 2/25 (2.1 overs) |

Hobart Hurricanes won by 7 wickets
Blundstone Arena, Hobart
Attendance: 10,478
Umpires: Simon Fry and Michael Graham-Smith
Player of the match: Matthew Wade (Hobart Hurricanes)

- Hobart Hurricanes won the toss and elected to field.

29 December 2018
19:00 (D/N)
Scorecard

| Sydney Sixers; 7/132 (20 overs) | v | Melbourne Renegades (H); 9/99 (20 overs) |
| Jordan Silk 30 (33); Kane Richardson 3/22 (4 overs) | | Mackenzie Harvey 30 (24); Tom Curran 3/18 (4 overs) |

Sydney Sixers won by 33 runs
Marvel Stadium, Melbourne
Attendance: 23,129
Umpires: Geoff Joshua and Sam Nogajski
Player of the match: Ben Manenti (Sydney Sixers)

- Melbourne Renegades won the toss and elected to field.
- Mackenzie Harvey (Melbourne Renegades) and Ben Manenti (Sydney Sixers) both made their T20 debuts.

30 December 2018
19:15 (D/N)
Scorecard

| Perth Scorchers; 8/107 (20 overs) | v | Hobart Hurricanes (H); 4/110 (17.3 overs) |
| Ashton Agar 32 (37); Riley Meredith 3/15 (4 overs) | | Alex Doolan 41* (36); Ashton Agar 2/19 (4 overs) |

Hobart Hurricanes won by 6 wickets
University of Tasmania Stadium, Launceston
Attendance: 12,455
Umpires: Michael Graham-Smith and Tony Wilds
Player of the match: Riley Meredith (Hobart Hurricanes)

- Hobart Hurricanes won the toss and elected to field.

31 December 2018
18:45 (D/N)
Scorecard

| (H) Adelaide Strikers; 4/175 (20 overs) | v | Sydney Thunder; 6/155 (20 overs) |
| Colin Ingram 75 (43); Daniel Sams 2/24 (4 overs) | | Callum Ferguson 47 (39); Peter Siddle 3/20 (4 overs) |

Adelaide Strikers won by 20 runs
Adelaide Oval, Adelaide
Attendance: 41,987
Umpires: Gerard Abood and Greg Davidson
Player of the match: Peter Siddle (Adelaide Strikers)

- Adelaide Strikers won the toss and elected to bat.

1 January 2019
13:45
Scorecard

| (H) Brisbane Heat; 7/164 (20 overs) | v | Sydney Sixers; 5/165 (19.3 overs) |
| Chris Lynn 84 (55); Tom Curran 3/25 (4 overs) | | Moises Henriques 57 (37); Josh Lalor 2/32 (4 overs) |

Sydney Sixers won by 5 wickets
Metricon Stadium, Gold Coast
Attendance: 17,106
Umpires: Phillip Gillespie and Donovan Koch
Player of the match: Chris Lynn (Brisbane Heat)

- Sydney Sixers won the toss and elected to field.
- Justin Avendano (Sydney Sixers) made his T20 debut.

1 January 2019
19:15 (D/N)
Scorecard

| Melbourne Renegades; 9/148 (20 overs) | v | Melbourne Stars (H); 3/151 (17.5 overs) |
| Dan Christian 32 (28); Dwayne Bravo 3/27 (4 overs) | | Marcus Stoinis 78* (49); Cameron Boyce 2/23 (4 overs) |

Melbourne Stars won by 7 wickets
Melbourne Cricket Ground, Melbourne
Attendance: 46,418
Umpires: Shawn Craig and John Ward
Player of the match: Marcus Stoinis (Melbourne Stars)

- Melbourne Stars won the toss and elected to field.
- Jonathan Merlo (Melbourne Stars) made his T20 debut.

2 January 2019
19:15 (D/N)
Scorecard

| (H) Sydney Thunder; 6/142 (20 overs) | v | Perth Scorchers; 5/141 (20 overs) |
| Jos Buttler 55 (54); Ashton Agar 2/27 (4 overs) | | Ashton Turner 60* (36); Fawad Ahmed 2/22 (4 overs) |

Sydney Thunder won by 1 run
Spotless Stadium, Sydney
Attendance: 17,882
Umpires: Tony Wilds and Paul Wilson
Player of the match: Callum Ferguson (Sydney Thunder)

- Sydney Thunder won the toss and elected to bat.

3 January 2019
19:15 (D/N)
Scorecard

| Adelaide Strikers; 6/158 (20 overs) | v | Melbourne Renegades (H); 9/126 (20 overs) |
| Jake Weatherald 71 (44); Cameron Boyce 2/16 (4 overs) | | Beau Webster 33 (36); Michael Neser 2/10 (3 overs) |

Adelaide Strikers won by 32 runs
GMHBA Stadium, Geelong
Attendance: 18,029
Umpires: Gerard Abood and Michael Graham-Smith
Player of the match: Jake Weatherald (Adelaide Strikers)

- Melbourne Renegades won the toss and elected to field.

4 January 2019
19:15 (D/N)
Scorecard

| Sydney Sixers; 8/161 (20 overs) | v | Hobart Hurricanes (H); 5/162 (19.5 overs) |
| Daniel Hughes 61 (40); Johan Botha 3/22 (4 overs) | | D'Arcy Short 64 (42); Sean Abbott 2/29 (4 overs) |

Hobart Hurricanes won by 5 wickets
Blundstone Arena, Hobart
Attendance: 12,920
Umpires: Simon Lightbody and John Ward
Player of the match: D'Arcy Short (Hobart Hurricanes)

- Hobart Hurricanes won the toss and elected to field.

5 January 2019
17:15 (D/N)
Scorecard

| Sydney Thunder; 8/135 (20 overs) | v | Melbourne Stars (H); 2/137 (17.2 overs) |
| Daniel Sams 42 (25); Scott Boland 2/28 (4 overs) | | Glenn Maxwell 41* (31); Fawad Ahmed 1/26 (4 overs) |

Melbourne Stars won by 8 wickets
Metricon Stadium, Gold Coast
Attendance: 8,156
Umpires: Greg Davidson and Geoff Joshua
Player of the match: Marcus Stoinis (Melbourne Stars)

- Sydney Thunder won the toss and elected to bat.

5 January 2019
18:30 (D/N)
Scorecard

| (H) Perth Scorchers; 6/135 (20 overs) | v | Brisbane Heat; 5/139 (18.2 overs) |
| Ashton Turner 47 (30); Mujeeb Ur Rahman 2/10 (4 overs) | | Chris Lynn 33 (34); Nathan Coulter-Nile 3/25 (4 overs) |

Brisbane Heat won by 5 wickets
Optus Stadium, Perth
Attendance: 40,511
Umpires: Phillip Gillespie and Tony Wilds
Player of the match: Mujeeb Ur Rahman (Brisbane Heat)

- Brisbane Heat won the toss and elected to field.

6 January 2019
18:45 (D/N)
Scorecard

| (H) Adelaide Strikers; 5/150 (20 overs) | v | Sydney Sixers; 4/152 (18.2 overs) |
| Jake Weatherald 50 (40); Steve O'Keefe 2/31 (4 overs) | | Joe Denly 76* (60); Rashid Khan 2/25 (4 overs) |

Sydney Sixers won by 6 wickets
Adelaide Oval, Adelaide
Attendance: 31,810
Umpires: Gerard Abood and Michael Graham-Smith
Player of the match: Joe Denly (Sydney Sixers)

- Adelaide Strikers won the toss and elected to bat.

7 January 2019
19:15 (D/N)
Scorecard

| Hobart Hurricanes; 5/145 (20 overs) | v | Melbourne Renegades (H); 4/150 (19.2 overs) |
| George Bailey 70* (53); Kane Richardson 3/38 (4 overs) | | Aaron Finch 42 (39); Clive Rose 1/15 (4 overs) |

Melbourne Renegades won by 6 wickets
Marvel Stadium, Melbourne
Attendance: 18,584
Umpires: Simon Lightbody and Paul Wilson
Player of the match: Sam Harper (Melbourne Renegades)

- Melbourne Renegades won the toss and elected to field.

8 January 2019
19:15 (D/N)
Scorecard

| Brisbane Heat; 8/186 (20 overs) | v | Sydney Thunder (H); 2/34 (5.3 overs) |
| Brendon McCullum 56 (35); Jonathan Cook 3/27 (4 overs) | | Callum Ferguson 16 (12); James Pattinson 1/6 (2 overs) |

Brisbane Heat won by 15 runs (D/L method)
Spotless Stadium, Sydney
Attendance: 11,147
Umpires: Shawn Craig and Greg Davidson
Player of the match: Chris Lynn (Brisbane Heat)

- Sydney Thunder won the toss and elected to field.
- Rain stopped play during Sydney Thunder's innings.

9 January 2019
19:15 (D/N)
Scorecard

| (H) Melbourne Stars; 6/146 (20 overs) | v | Perth Scorchers; 4/147 (17.4 overs) |
| Ben Dunk 62 (47); Andrew Tye 4/18 (4 overs) | | Cameron Bancroft 59 (42); Dwayne Bravo 2/18 (3 overs) |

Perth Scorchers won by 6 wickets
Melbourne Cricket Ground, Melbourne
Attendance: 25,342
Umpires: Simon Fry and Sam Nogajski
Player of the match: Andrew Tye (Perth Scorchers)

- Perth Scorchers won the toss and elected to field.
- Aaron Hardie (Perth Scorchers) made his T20 debut.

10 January 2019
18:15 (D/N)
Scorecard

| (H) Brisbane Heat; 8/144 (20 overs) | v | Melbourne Renegades; 2/145 (15.4 overs) |
| Brendon McCullum 50 (47); Usman Shinwari 3/16 (4 overs) | | Sam Harper 56* (40); Mujeeb Ur Rahman 1/23 (4 overs) |

Melbourne Renegades won by 8 wickets
The Gabba, Brisbane
Attendance: 30,281
Umpires: Geoff Joshua and Simon Lightbody
Player of the match: Sam Harper (Melbourne Renegades)

- Melbourne Renegades won the toss and elected to field.

11 January 2019
18:30 (D/N)
Scorecard

| (H) Adelaide Strikers; 5/178 (20 overs) | v | Melbourne Stars; 137 (19.2 overs) |
| Colin Ingram 57 (41); Liam Plunkett 4/36 (4 overs) | | Evan Gulbis 37 (25); Ben Laughlin 3/19 (3.2 overs) |

Adelaide Strikers won by 41 runs
Adelaide Oval, Adelaide
Attendance: 30,392
Umpires: John Ward and Tony Wilds
Player of the match: Colin Ingram (Adelaide Strikers)

- Melbourne Stars won the toss and elected to field.

13 January 2019
14:45
Scorecard

| (H) Sydney Thunder; 6/168 (20 overs) | v | Adelaide Strikers; 97 (17.4 overs) |
| Shane Watson 68 (40); Rashid Khan 2/21 (4 overs) | | Colin Ingram 48 (30); Arjun Nair 3/12 (3 overs) |

Sydney Thunder won by 71 runs
Spotless Stadium, Sydney
Attendance: 17,010
Umpires: Gerard Abood and Simon Lightbody
Player of the match: Shane Watson (Sydney Thunder)

- Sydney Thunder won the toss and elected to bat.

13 January 2019
18:35 (D/N)
Scorecard

| Brisbane Heat; 4/192 (20 overs) | v | Melbourne Renegades (H); 91 (17.5 overs) |
| Brendon McCullum 69 (43); Dan Christian 2/24 (4 overs) | | Cameron Boyce 25 (21); Brendan Doggett 3/16 (2.5 overs) |

Brisbane Heat won by 101 runs
GMHBA Stadium, Geelong
Attendance: 16,008
Umpires: Shawn Craig and Phillip Gillespie
Player of the match: Max Bryant (Brisbane Heat)

- Melbourne Renegades won the toss and elected to field.

13 January 2019
18:35 (D/N)
Scorecard

| Sydney Sixers; 5/177 (20 overs) | v | Perth Scorchers (H); 3/178 (18.5 overs) |
| Moises Henriques 38 (21); Matthew Kelly 2/32 (4 overs) | | Cameron Bancroft 87* (61); Ben Manenti 1/16 (2 overs) |

Perth Scorchers won by 7 wickets
Optus Stadium, Perth
Attendance: 30,075
Umpires: Simon Fry and Geoff Joshua
Player of the match: Cameron Bancroft (Perth Scorchers)

- Perth Scorchers won the toss and elected to field.
- Cameron Green (Perth Scorchers) made his T20 debut.

14 January 2019
19:15 (D/N)
Scorecard

| Hobart Hurricanes; 2/185 (20 overs) | v | Melbourne Stars (H); 126 (17.1 overs) |
| D'Arcy Short 96* (57); Tom O'Connell 1/17 (2 overs) | | Seb Gotch 35 (26); Riley Meredith 4/21 (4 overs) |

Hobart Hurricanes won by 59 runs
Melbourne Cricket Ground, Melbourne
Attendance: 20,188
Umpires: Michael Graham-Smith and John Ward
Player of the match: D'Arcy Short (Hobart Hurricanes)

- Melbourne Stars won the toss and elected to field.
- Tom O'Connell (Melbourne Stars) made his T20 debut.

16 January 2019
19:15 (D/N)
Scorecard

| (H) Sydney Sixers; 9/115 (20 overs) | v | Melbourne Renegades; 3/116 (13 overs) |
| Tom Curran 44 (30); Mohammad Nabi 4/25 (4 overs) | | Tom Cooper 49 (33); Steve O'Keefe 2/23 (3 overs) |

Melbourne Renegades won by 7 wickets
Sydney Cricket Ground, Sydney
Attendance: 16,281
Umpires: Greg Davidson and Phillip Gillespie
Player of the match: Kane Richardson (Melbourne Renegades)

- Melbourne Renegades won the toss and elected to field.

17 January 2019
18:15 (D/N)
Scorecard

| Sydney Thunder; 4/186 (20 overs) | v | Brisbane Heat (H); 2/10 (3 overs) |
| Shane Watson 100 (62); Ben Cutting 2/41 (4 overs) | | Chris Lynn 4 (9); Gurinder Sandhu 1/3 (1 over) |

No result
The Gabba, Brisbane
Attendance: 26,644
Umpires: Shawn Craig and Donovan Koch

- Sydney Thunder won the toss and elected to bat.
- Jack Prestwidge (Brisbane Heat) made his T20 debut.
- A flood light failure stopped play during Brisbane Heat's innings.

18 January 2019
18:30 (D/N)
Scorecard

| (H) Perth Scorchers; 9/177 (20 overs) | v | Hobart Hurricanes; 6/178 (19.3 overs) |
| Sam Whiteman 68 (44); James Faulkner 3/35 (4 overs) | | George Bailey 69 (39); Aaron Hardie 2/25 (3 overs) |

Hobart Hurricanes won by 4 wickets
Optus Stadium, Perth
Attendance: 36,612
Umpires: Michael Graham-Smith and Tony Wilds
Player of the match: George Bailey (Hobart Hurricanes)

- Hobart Hurricanes won the toss and elected to field.
- David Moody (Hobart Hurricanes) made his T20 debut.

19 January 2019
18:45 (D/N)
Scorecard

| (H) Melbourne Renegades; 121 (19.3 overs) | v | Melbourne Stars; 4/124 (19.2 overs) |
| Mohammad Nabi 28 (33); Marcus Stoinis 3/19 (4 overs) | | Marcus Stoinis 70* (65); Kane Richardson 2/17 (4 overs) |

Melbourne Stars won by 6 wickets
Marvel Stadium, Melbourne
Attendance: 38,117
Umpires: Phillip Gillespie and Geoff Joshua
Player of the match: Marcus Stoinis (Melbourne Stars)

- Melbourne Stars won the toss and elected to field.

20 January 2019
19:15 (D/N)
Scorecard

| (H) Sydney Sixers; 7/177 (20 overs) | v | Brisbane Heat; 98 (18.1 overs) |
| James Vince 75 (46); Josh Lalor 5/26 (4 overs) | | Ben Cutting 28 (26); Tom Curran 3/16 (4 overs) |

Sydney Sixers won by 79 runs
Sydney Cricket Ground, Sydney
Attendance: 14,921
Umpires: Shawn Craig and John Ward
Player of the match: James Vince (Sydney Sixers)

- Brisbane Heat won the toss and elected to field.

21 January 2019
18:45 (D/N)
Scorecard

| (H) Adelaide Strikers; 5/154 (20 overs) | v | Hobart Hurricanes; 0/158 (16.5 overs) |
| Colin Ingram 67* (36); Jofra Archer 2/23 (4 overs) | | Matthew Wade 84* (49) |

Hobart Hurricanes won by 10 wickets
Adelaide Oval, Adelaide
Attendance: 27,514
Umpires: Simon Lightbody and Paul Wilson
Player of the match: Matthew Wade (Hobart Hurricanes)

- Adelaide Strikers won the toss and elected to bat.

22 January 2019
19:15 (D/N)
Scorecard

| Melbourne Renegades; 9/152 (20 overs) | v | Sydney Thunder (H); 5/140 (20 overs) |
| Aaron Finch 54 (38); Gurinder Sandhu 3/23 (4 overs) | | Jason Sangha 54* (49); Harry Gurney 2/27 (4 overs) |

Melbourne Renegades won by 12 runs
Spotless Stadium, Sydney
Attendance: 10,332
Umpires: Shawn Craig and Greg Davidson
Player of the match: Harry Gurney (Melbourne Renegades)

- Sydney Thunder won the toss and elected to field.

23 January 2019
14:45
Scorecard

| (H) Melbourne Stars; 2/167 (20 overs) | v | Adelaide Strikers; 123 (19.4 overs) |
| Ben Dunk 72* (53); Rashid Khan 1/32 (4 overs) | | Jake Lehmann 40 (32); Marcus Stoinis 3/20 (4 overs) |

Melbourne Stars won by 44 runs
Ted Summerton Reserve, Moe
Attendance: 6,093
Umpires: Phillip Gillespie and Michael Graham-Smith
Player of the match: Ben Dunk (Melbourne Stars)

- Adelaide Strikers won the toss and elected to field.

23 January 2019
19:15 (D/N)
Scorecard

| Hobart Hurricanes; 4/172 (20 overs) | v | Sydney Sixers (H); 1/173 (17.1 overs) |
| Matthew Wade 64 (51); Ben Dwarshuis 1/25 (3 overs) | | Josh Philippe 86* (49); James Faulkner 1/22 (3 overs) |

Sydney Sixers won by 9 wickets
Sydney Cricket Ground, Sydney
Attendance: 21,162
Umpires: Sam Nogajski and Tony Wilds
Player of the match: Josh Philippe (Sydney Sixers)

- Sydney Sixers won the toss and elected to field.
- Josh Philippe scored the highest individual score for the Sixers in BBL history with 86*, surpassing Daniel Hughes and Nic Maddinson, who had both previously scored 85.
- Philippe and James Vince also scored the highest second-wicket partnership in BBL history, scoring 167*. This was also the highest partnership for any wicket by the Sixers.

24 January 2019
18:40 (D/N)
Scorecard

| (H) Perth Scorchers; 4/181 (20 overs) | v | Sydney Thunder; 4/182 (19.2 overs) |
| Shaun Marsh 96* (55); Chris Green 2/35 (4 overs) | | Callum Ferguson 113* (53); Matthew Kelly 1/25 (4 overs) |

Sydney Thunder won by 6 wickets
Optus Stadium, Perth
Attendance: 24,727
Umpires: Simon Fry and John Ward
Player of the match: Callum Ferguson (Sydney Thunder)

- Sydney Thunder won the toss and elected to field.
- Nick Hobson (Perth Scorchers) and Matthew Gilkes (Sydney Thunder) both made their T20 debuts.

27 January 2019
19:40 (D/N)
Scorecard

| (H) Melbourne Stars; 134/8 (20 overs) | v | Brisbane Heat; 129/8 (20 overs) |
| Marcus Stoinis 43 (29); Ben Cutting 2/10 (2 overs) | | Matt Renshaw 45 (43); Marcus Stoinis 4/21 (4 overs) |

Melbourne Stars won by 5 runs
Melbourne Cricket Ground, Melbourne
Attendance: 22,231
Umpires: Simon Fry and Geoff Joshua
Player of the match: Marcus Stoinis (Melbourne Stars)

- Brisbane Heat won the toss and elected to field.

28 January 2019
18:15 (D/N)
Scorecard

| Melbourne Renegades; 5/157 (20 overs) | v | Perth Scorchers (H); 79 (16 overs) |
| Mackenzie Harvey 38 (32); Matthew Kelly 2/30 (4 overs) | | Nick Hobson 19 (18); Dan Christian 4/20 (3 overs) |

Melbourne Renegades won by 78 runs
Optus Stadium, Perth
Attendance: 21,698
Umpires: Shawn Craig and Paul Wilson
Player of the match: Chris Tremain (Melbourne Renegades)

- Perth Scorchers won the toss and elected to field.

29 January 2019
16:00
Scorecard

| Brisbane Heat; 6/145 (20 overs) | v | Hobart Hurricanes (H); 1/146 (14.2 overs) |
| Alex Ross 62 (35); James Faulkner 2/27 (4 overs); David Moody 2/27 (4 overs) | | D'Arcy Short 68* (41); Ben Cutting 1/29 (3 overs) |

Hobart Hurricanes won by 9 wickets
Blundstone Arena, Hobart
Attendance: 11,320
Umpires: Sam Nogajski and John Ward
Player of the match: D'Arcy Short (Hobart Hurricanes)

- Hobart Hurricanes won the toss and elected to field.
- Jarrod Freeman (Hobart Hurricanes) made his T20 debut.

29 January 2019
19:00 (D/N)
Scorecard

| Adelaide Strikers; 8/124 (20 overs) | v | Sydney Sixers (H); 2/130 (14.1 overs) |
| Jake Lehmann 46 (46); Ben Dwarshuis 3/7 (4 overs) | | Moises Henriques 61* (31); Michael Neser 1/11 (2 overs) |

Sydney Sixers won by 8 wickets
Sydney Cricket Ground, Sydney
Attendance: 8,083
Umpires: Greg Davidson and Tony Wilds
Player of the match: Ben Dwarshuis (Sydney Sixers)

- Sydney Sixers won the toss and elected to field.

30 January 2019
19:15 (D/N)
Scorecard

| (H) Melbourne Renegades; 7/140 (20 overs) | v | Sydney Thunder; 113 (20 overs) |
| Cameron Boyce 51* (22); Jonathan Cook 2/18 (3 overs) | | Baxter Holt 37 (28); Kane Richardson 3/27 (4 overs) |

Melbourne Renegades won by 27 runs
Marvel Stadium, Melbourne
Attendance: 10,287
Umpires: Phillip Gillespie and Geoff Joshua
Player of the match: Cameron Boyce (Melbourne Renegades)

- Melbourne Renegades won the toss and elected to bat.
- Baxter Holt (Sydney Thunder) made his T20 debut.

31 January 2019
19:40 (D/N)
Scorecard

| (H) Hobart Hurricanes; 7/169 (20 overs) | v | Adelaide Strikers; 3/170 (17.5 overs) |
| Matthew Wade 88 (54); Ben Laughlin 3/31 (4 overs) | | Jake Weatherald 82 (42); Simon Milenko 1/19 (2 overs) |

Adelaide Strikers won by 7 wickets
University of Tasmania Stadium, Launceston
Attendance: 13,836
Umpires: Simon Lightbody and John Ward
Player of the match: Jake Weatherald (Adelaide Strikers)

- Adelaide Strikers won the toss and elected to field.

1 February 2019
19:40 (D/N)
Scorecard

| Perth Scorchers; 9/128 (20 overs) | v | Brisbane Heat (H); 4/130 (17.3 overs) |
| Nick Hobson 43 (35); Mujeeb Ur Rahman 3/16 (4 overs) | | Chris Lynn 56* (39); Matthew Kelly 2/27 (3 overs) |

Brisbane Heat won by 6 wickets
The Gabba, Brisbane
Attendance: 21,254
Umpires: Greg Davidson and Donovan Koch
Player of the match: Mujeeb Ur Rahman (Brisbane Heat)

- Brisbane Heat won the toss and elected to field.
- Matthew Kuhnemann (Brisbane Heat) and Clint Hinchliffe (Perth Scorchers) both made their T20 debuts.
- Josh Lalor (Brisbane Heat) took a hat-trick.
- Chris Lynn (Brisbane Heat) became the leading run-scorer in the Big Bash League with 1,945 runs.

2 February 2019
19:00 (D/N)
Scorecard

| Sydney Thunder; 6/128 (20 overs) | v | Sydney Sixers (H); 1/85 (10.3 overs) |
| Chris Green 34* (22); Sean Abbott 2/23 (4 overs) | | James Vince 43* (35) |

Sydney Sixers won by 9 wickets (D/L method)
Sydney Cricket Ground, Sydney
Attendance: 34,385
Umpires: Simon Fry and Paul Wilson
Player of the match: Sean Abbott (Sydney Sixers)

- Sydney Sixers won the toss and elected to field.
- Sydney Sixers were set a revised target of 124 runs from 19 overs due to rain. This was further reduced to 84 runs from 12 overs.

3 February 2019
17:45 (D/N)
Scorecard

| (H) Adelaide Strikers; 8/176 (20 overs) | v | Brisbane Heat; 4/180 (18.4 overs) |
| Jonathan Wells 30 (27); Josh Lalor 3/25 (4 overs) | | Matt Renshaw 90* (50); Peter Siddle 2/39 (4 overs) |

Brisbane Heat won by 6 wickets
Adelaide Oval, Adelaide
Attendance: 19,075
Umpires: Phillip Gillespie and Michael Graham-Smith
Player of the match: Matt Renshaw (Brisbane Heat)

- Brisbane Heat won the toss and elected to field.

3 February 2019
18:15 (D/N)
Scorecard

| (H) Perth Scorchers; 3/182 (20 overs) | v | Melbourne Stars; 9/155 (20 overs) |
| Ashton Turner 69 (42); Liam Plunkett 1/23 (3 overs) | | Glenn Maxwell 61 (40); Nathan Coulter-Nile 3/30 (4 overs) |

Perth Scorchers won by 27 runs
Optus Stadium, Perth
Attendance: 16,660
Umpires: Gerard Abood and Nathan Johnstone
Player of the match: Ashton Turner (Perth Scorchers)

- Melbourne Stars won the toss and elected to field.
- Michael Klinger (Perth Scorchers) regained his record of the leading run-scorer in the Big Bash League with 1,947 runs. Chris Lynn of the Brisbane Heat had over taken Klinger two nights prior.

7 February 2019
19:40 (D/N)
Scorecard

| (H) Hobart Hurricanes; 6/183 (20 overs) | v | Melbourne Renegades; 8/167 (20 overs) |
| Matthew Wade 58 (30); Harry Gurney 2/40 (4 overs) | | Tom Cooper 44 (34); Jofra Archer 2/19 (4 overs) |

Hobart Hurricanes won by 16 runs
Blundstone Arena, Hobart
Attendance: 8,235
Umpires: Shawn Craig and Geoff Joshua
Player of the match: Matthew Wade (Hobart Hurricanes)

- Melbourne Renegades won the toss and elected to field.

8 February 2019
19:40 (D/N)
Scorecard

| Melbourne Stars; 8/156 (20 overs) | v | Brisbane Heat (H); 0/158 (10 overs) |
| Marcus Stoinis 81 (51); Josh Lalor 3/43 (4 overs) | | Ben Cutting 81* (30) |

Brisbane Heat won by 10 wickets
The Gabba, Brisbane
Attendance: 21,391
Umpires: Greg Davidson and Tony Wilds
Player of the match: Ben Cutting (Brisbane Heat)

- Brisbane Heat won the toss and elected to field.

9 February 2019
13:15
Scorecard

| Perth Scorchers; 6/174 (20 overs) | v | Adelaide Strikers (H); 5/175 (19.2 overs) |
| Josh Inglis 55 (37); Rashid Khan 2/22 (4 overs) | | Jonathan Wells 69 (42); Nathan Coulter-Nile 2/28 (4 overs) |

Adelaide Strikers won by 5 wickets
Adelaide Oval, Adelaide
Attendance: 11,673
Umpires: David Shepard and John Ward
Player of the match: Jonathan Wells (Adelaide Strikers)

- Perth Scorchers won the toss and elected to bat.

9 February 2019
18:15 (D/N)
Scorecard

| Hobart Hurricanes; 4/165 (19 overs) | v | Sydney Thunder (H); 6/166 (18.2 overs) |
| George Bailey 53 (35); Pat Cummins 2/28 (4 overs) | | Callum Ferguson 47 (34); Qais Ahmad 2/22 (4 overs) |

Sydney Thunder won by 4 wickets
Manuka Oval, Canberra
Attendance: 11,557
Umpires: Simon Lightbody and Paul Wilson
Player of the match: Pat Cummins (Sydney Thunder)

- Sydney Thunder won the toss and elected to field.
- The match was reduced to 19 overs per side due to rain.

10 February 2019
14:45
Scorecard

| (H) Melbourne Stars; 6/168 (20 overs) | v | Sydney Sixers; 74 (13.4 overs) |
| Glenn Maxwell 82 (43); Tom Curran 2/39 (4 overs) | | Daniel Hughes 12 (9); Sandeep Lamichhane 3/11 (3.4 overs) |

Melbourne Stars won by 94 runs
Melbourne Cricket Ground, Melbourne
Attendance: 22,359
Umpires: Gerard Abood and Sam Nogajski
Player of the match: Glenn Maxwell (Melbourne Stars)

- Sydney Sixers won the toss and elected to field.

== Play-offs ==
Semifinals
1 | Hobart Hurricanes (H) | 7/153
4 | Melbourne Stars | 4/157
3 | Sydney Sixers | 3/180
2 | Melbourne Renegades (H) | 7/184

Final
2 | Melbourne Renegades (H) | 5/145
4 | Melbourne Stars | 7/132

=== Semi-final 1 ===
14 February 2019
19:40 (D/N)
Scorecard

| (H) Hobart Hurricanes; 7/153 (20 overs) | v | Melbourne Stars; 4/157 (18.5 overs) |
| Ben McDermott 53 (42); Daniel Worrall 4/23 (4 overs) | | Glenn Maxwell 43* (33); Qais Ahmad 3/33 (4 overs) |

Melbourne Stars won by 6 wickets
Blundstone Arena, Hobart
Attendance: 12,404
Umpires: Shawn Craig and Sam Nogajski
Player of the match: Daniel Worrall (Melbourne Stars)

- Melbourne Stars won the toss and elected to field.

=== Semi-final 2 ===
15 February 2019
19:40 (D/N)
Scorecard

| Sydney Sixers; 3/180 (20 overs) | v | Melbourne Renegades (H); 7/184 (19.5 overs) |
| Josh Philippe 52 (31); Cameron Boyce 2/33 (4 overs) | | Aaron Finch 44 (41); Steve O'Keefe 2/22 (4 overs) |

Melbourne Renegades won by 3 wickets
Marvel Stadium, Melbourne
Attendance: 15,342
Umpires: Gerard Abood and Phillip Gillespie
Player of the match: Dan Christian (Melbourne Renegades)

- Melbourne Renegades won the toss and elected to field.

=== Final ===
17 February 2019
14:45
Scorecard

| (H) Melbourne Renegades; 5/145 (20 overs) | v | Melbourne Stars; 7/132 (20 overs) |
| Tom Cooper 43* (35); Adam Zampa 2/21 (4 overs) | | Ben Dunk 57 (45); Chris Tremain 2/21 (4 overs) |

Melbourne Renegades won by 13 runs
Marvel Stadium, Melbourne
Attendance: 40,816
Umpires: Gerard Abood and Sam Nogajski
Player of the match: Dan Christian (Melbourne Renegades)

- Melbourne Stars won the toss and elected to field.

== Statistics ==
Most runs
| Player | Team | Runs |
|---|---|---|
| D'Arcy Short | Hobart Hurricanes | 637 |
| Matthew Wade | Hobart Hurricanes | 592 |
| Marcus Stoinis | Melbourne Stars | 533 |
| Callum Ferguson | Sydney Thunder | 442 |
| Daniel Hughes | Sydney Sixers | 399 |

Most wickets
| Player | Team | Wickets |
|---|---|---|
| Kane Richardson | Melbourne Renegades | 24 |
| James Faulkner | Hobart Hurricanes | 18 |
| Sean Abbott | Sydney Sixers | 18 |
| Steve O'Keefe | Sydney Sixers | 17 |
| Tom Curran | Sydney Sixers | 16 |

== TV audience ==
This was the first BBL season featuring the new cricket broadcasting rights deal made between Cricket Australia, Fox Sports Australia and Seven Network. Fox Sports broadcast all 59 matches from the BBL season on their new Fox Cricket channel, with 16 of those broadcast exclusively. Channel Seven will be broadcasting 43 matches, including all finals fixtures. For these 43 matches Channel Seven were the “Host Broadcaster” and did the toss and player of the match.

| Match No | Teams | Average TV Ratings | | | | | | | |
| Match No | Teams | National (Channel Seven) | | 5 Metro Cities (Channel Seven) | | National (Fox Cricket) | | National Total (Seven + Fox) | |
| Match No | Teams | Session 1 | Session 2 | Session 1 | Session 2 | Session 1 | Session 2 | Session 1 | Session 2 |
|---|---|---|---|---|---|---|---|---|---|
| 1 | Brisbane Heat vs Adelaide Strikers | 879,000 | 920,000 | 594,000 | 614,000 | 267,000 | 286,000 | 1,146,000 | 1,206,000 |
| 2 | Melbourne Renegades vs Perth Scorchers | 808,000 | 839,000 | 528,000 | 555,000 | 220,000 | 270,000 | 1,028,000 | 1,109,000 |
| 3 | Sydney Thunder vs Melbourne Stars | 777,000 | 623,000 | 529,000 | 422,000 | 197,000 | 168,000 | 974,000 | 791,000 |
| 4 | Sydney Sixers vs Perth Scorchers | - | - | - | - | 188,000 | 229,000 | 188,000 | 229,000 |
| 5 | Brisbane Heat vs Hobart Hurricanes | - | - | - | - | 286,000 | 315,000 | 286,000 | 315,000 |
| 6 | Adelaide Strikers vs Melbourne Renegades | 749,000 | 807,000 | 510,000 | 555,000 | | | | |
| 7 | Hobart Hurricanes vs Melbourne Stars | - | - | - | - | | | | |
| 8 | Sydney Thunder vs Sydney Sixers | 642,000 | 584,000 | 399,000 | 374,000 | | | | |
| 9 | Perth Scorchers vs Adelaide Strikers | 983,000 | 864,000 | 667,000 | 579,000 | | | | |
| 10 | Sydney Sixers vs Melbourne Stars | 830,000 | 785,000 | 543,000 | 528,000 | | | | |
| 11 | Hobart Hurricanes vs Sydney Thunder | 834,000 | 870,000 | 574,000 | 582,000 | 216,000 | 241,000 | 1,050,000 | 1,111,000 |
| 12 | Melbourne Renegades vs Sydney Sixers | - | - | - | - | 292,000 | 286,000 | 292,000 | 286,000 |
| 13 | Hobart Hurricanes vs Perth Scorchers | 876,000 | 795,000 | 581,000 | 523,000 | | | | |
| 14 | Adelaide Strikers vs Sydney Thunder | 636,000 | 610,000 | 435,000 | 416,000 | | | | |
| 15 | Brisbane Heat vs Sydney Sixers | | | 311,000 | 402,000 | | | | |
| 16 | Melbourne Stars vs Melbourne Renegades | | | 530,000 | 518,000 | | | | |
| 17 | Sydney Thunder vs Perth Scorchers | 829,000 | 885,000 | 560,000 | 611,000 | 233,000 | 230,000 | 1,062,000 | 1,115,000 |
| 18 | Melbourne Renegades vs Adelaide Strikers | 835,000 | 827,000 | 563,000 | 570,000 | 211,000 | 189,000 | 1,046,000 | 1,016,000 |
| 19 | Hobart Hurricanes vs Sydney Sixers | 746,000 | 818,000 | 454,000 | 514,000 | | | | |
| 20 | Melbourne Stars vs Sydney Thunder | - | - | - | - | 195,000 | 287,000 | 195,000 | 287,000 |
| 21 | Perth Scorchers vs Brisbane Heat | - | - | - | - | 242,000 | 149,000 | 242,000 | 149,000 |
| 22 | Adelaide Strikers vs Sydney Sixers | | | | | | | | |
| SF1 | Hobart Hurricanes vs Melbourne Stars | 458,000 | 460,000 | - | - | 254,000 | 270,000 | 712,000 | 730,000 |
| SF2 | Melbourne Renegades vs Sydney Sixers | 458,000 | 533,000 | - | - | 223,000 | 266,000 | 681,000 | 799,000 |
| Final | Melbourne Renegades vs Melbourne Stars | 475,000 | 600,000 | - | - | 287,000 | 342,000 | 762,000 | 942,000 |

- League matches broadcast by both Fox Cricket and Channel Seven.
- League matches broadcast exclusively by Fox Cricket.
- Semi-finals and final broadcast by both Fox Cricket and Channel Seven.

== See also ==
- 2018–19 Women's Big Bash League season
