= David Moody (cricketer) =

Australian cricketer

Personal information
- Full name: David John Masson Moody
- Born: 28 April 1995 (age 31); Maylands, Perth, Western Australia
- Height: 1.95 m (6 ft 5 in)
- Batting: Right-handed
- Bowling: Right-arm fast-medium
- Role: Bowler
- Relatives: Tom Moody (uncle)

Domestic team information
- Years: Team
- 2014/15–2022/23: Western Australia
- 2018/19: Perth Scorchers
- 2024/25–: Victoria

Career statistics
Competition	FC	LA	T20
Matches	45	14	10
Runs scored	240	21	8
Batting average	7.50	5.25	8.00
100s/50s	0/0	0/0	0/0
Top score	31*	8	8
Balls bowled	7,714	611	163
Wickets	131	12	9
Bowling average	36.04	53.75	26.55
5 wickets in innings	1	0	0
10 wickets in match	0	0	0
Best bowling	5/59	3/44	3/16
Catches/stumpings	19/–	5/–	1/–
- Source: Cricinfo, 23 October 2026

David John Masson Moody (born 28 April 1995) is an Australian cricketer. Moody was born in Perth, and attended Guildford Grammar School between 2008 and 2012.

He made his first-class debut for Western Australia during the 2014–15 Sheffield Shield season. The nephew of Tom Moody, a former Australian international, he had earlier played matches for several invitational sides against international teams in preparation for the 2015 World Cup, including games against Afghanistan, Bangladesh, India, and the United Arab Emirates. He also featured in the 2015 Prime Minister's XI match against England. Moody, a right-arm medium pacer, secured a rookie contract with the Western Australian Cricket Association (WACA) for the 2014–15 domestic season, and on debut against New South Wales in February 2015 took 4/60 in the first innings, including wickets in both his first and third overs. He took his maiden first-class five wicket haul in March 2017 on the second day of the Victoria v Western Australia Sheffield Shield match in Alice Springs.

He made his Twenty20 debut for the Hobart Hurricanes in the 2018–19 Big Bash League season on 18 January 2019.
