= Brayden Stepien =

Australian cricketer (born 1997)

Personal information
- Born: 27 July 1997 (age 29); Bendigo, Victoria
- Batting: Left-handed
- Bowling: Right-arm medium
- Role: Wicket-keeper

Domestic team information
- Years: Team
- 2019/20: Melbourne Renegades (squad no. 4)

Career statistics
Competition	T20
Matches	2
Runs scored	–
Batting average	–
100s/50s	–
Top score	–
Catches/stumpings	0/–
- Source: Cricinfo, 7 October 2021

Brayden Stepien (born 27 July 1997) is an Australian cricketer. Stepien was called into the Melbourne Renegades squad in 2020 as a local replacement player for Sam Harper, where he made his Twenty20 debut on 25 January 2020, for the Melbourne Renegades in the 2019–20 Big Bash League season. On 14 January 2021, Stepien was recalled to the Renegades squad as a local replacement player for Cameron Boyce.
