= Jonathan Cook (cricketer) =

Australian cricketer (born 1989)

Personal information
- Full name: Jonathan David Cook
- Born: 14 December 1989 (age 36); Port Macquarie, New South Wales, Australia
- Batting: Right-handed
- Bowling: Right-arm leg break
- Role: Bowler

Domestic team information
- Years: Team
- 2018/19–2020/21: Sydney Thunder

Career statistics
Competition	T20
Matches	24
Runs scored	21
Batting average	10.50
100s/50s	0/0
Top score	12*
Balls bowled	474
Wickets	24
Bowling average	25.00
5 wickets in innings	0
10 wickets in match	0
Best bowling	4/21
Catches/stumpings	6/–
- Source: Cricinfo, 4 October 2021

Jonathan David Cook (born 14 December 1989) is an Australian cricketer. He made his Twenty20 debut for Sydney Thunder in the 2018–19 Big Bash League season on 24 December 2018.
