= Cameron Valente =

Australian cricketer

Personal information
- Full name: Cameron Valente
- Born: 6 September 1994 (age 32)
- Batting: Right-handed
- Bowling: Right-arm medium-fast
- Role: All-rounder

Domestic team information
- Years: Team
- 2016–present: South Australia (squad no. 3)
- 2016–2017: Perth Scorchers
- 2017–2018: Brisbane Heat
- 2019–present: Adelaide Strikers
- First-class debut: 14 February 2016 South Australia v Victoria
- Last First-class: 23 November 2017 South Australia v Tasmania
- List A debut: 2 October 2016 South Australia v Western Australia

Career statistics
Competition	FC	LA	T20
Matches	10	29	14
Runs scored	217	574	84
Batting average	12.05	26.09	16.80
100s/50s	0/0	2/0	0/0
Top score	43	100	21
Balls bowled	1,746	1,407	210
Wickets	14	36	8
Bowling average	55.57	35.69	39.75
5 wickets in innings	0	0	0
10 wickets in match	0	0	0
Best bowling	4/36	4/49	2/36
Catches/stumpings	2/-	7/-	1/–
- Source: ESPNcricinfo, 4 October 2021

Cameron Valente (born 6 September 1994) is an Australian cricketer. He plays as an all-rounder and is contracted to the South Australian Redbacks.

Valente represented South Australia at under-17 and under-19 level before playing for the Australia national under-19 cricket team in the 2014 Under-19 Cricket World Cup. He rose through the ranks, impressing for South Australia's under-23 team in the Futures League and making his first-class debut in the 2015–16 Sheffield Shield season. His best performances for South Australia have come in List A matches, as he took the equal-most wickets in the 2016–17 Matador BBQs One-Day Cup and has scored two List A centuries.

== Early life and youth career ==
Valente grew up in Adelaide, where his father played cricket for Flinders University. His mother died of cancer when he was four years old, which meant Valente had to spend much of his time with his father at cricket training and matches. Valente took up cricket himself and began to play grade cricket for Adelaide Cricket Club, eventually representing South Australia at both Under-17 and Under-19 National Championships. In the 2012–13 season he played for Adelaide in A-grade cricket, taking 12 wickets and scoring 174 runs in 10 matches, proving himself enough to be included in Australia's national under-19 team. He played sixteen Youth One Day Internationals for Australia, including playing in the 2014 Under-19 Cricket World Cup. After this he earned a Hampshire scholarship to spend two months playing in Hampshire's local league and training in English conditions.

== Domestic career ==
Valente started to impress in the 2014–15 season. Playing for the Western Grit in the SACA Premier League he took 17 wickets at an average of 20.71 and scored 260 runs at an average of 52 to prove his abilities as an all-rounder. In the first round of grade cricket he played a match-winning performance for Adelaide, with scores of 96 and 49 not with the bat and bowling performances of 6/33 and 2/37, and despite not having a first-class contract he was included in South Australia's 12-man squad for a match against New South Wales. Throughout the season he had impressive form in the Futures League playing for South Australia's Under-23 side, and he was rewarded at the end of the season with a rookie contract for South Australia.

In his first season with the Redbacks, Valente made his first-class debut, playing in a Sheffield Shield match against Victoria. He continued to impress and was given a second rookie contract for the 2016–17 season, during which he made his List A debut in the 2016–17 Matador BBQs One-Day Cup. During the tournament he scored his maiden List A century against Victoria, saving South Australia from embarrassment in a heavy loss. At the end of the tournament Valente was the equal leading wicket-taker across the entire tournament, taking 15 wickets at a bowling average of 16.73, including a career-best 4/49 against Cricket Australia XI. Later in the season Valente also had an opportunity to play against a world-class lineup when he was included in a Cricket Australia XI team against the touring Pakistan national cricket team. Valente was the best of the Cricket Australia XI bowlers, taking 4/36. On 20 December 2016 he signed with Big Bash team the Perth Scorchers as a replacement for the injured Jason Behrendorff. At the end of the season he was promoted from a rookie contract to a full contract with South Australia for the 2017–18 season.

He made his Twenty20 debut for Adelaide Strikers in the 2018–19 Big Bash League season on 23 December 2018.
