= Baxter Holt =

Australian cricketer (born 1999)

Personal information
- Full name: Baxter Jason Holt
- Born: 21 October 1999 (age 27); Carlingford, New South Wales, Australia
- Batting: Right-handed
- Bowling: Right-arm medium
- Role: Wicket-keeper-batsman

Domestic team information
- Years: Team
- 2018/19–2021/22: Sydney Thunder (squad no. 27)
- 2018/19–2022/23: New South Wales
- 2024/25–2025/26: Western Australia

Career statistics
Competition	FC	LA	T20
Matches	12	8	9
Runs scored	363	122	84
Batting average	21.35	20.33	14.00
100s/50s	0/1	0/0	0/0
Top score	54	41*	37
Catches/stumpings	38/2	14/2	8/2
- Source: Cricinfo, 20 May 2026

Baxter Jason Holt (born 21 October 1999) is an Australian cricketer who plays as a right-handed wicket-keeper-batsman. Holt has represented both his native New South Wales and Western Australia in Australian domestic cricket. He is a graduate from The King's School, Parramatta. In 2018 he played for the Australia national under-19 cricket team and has previously played for Sydney Thunder in the Big Bash League

== Career ==
On 30 January 2019 Holt made his Twenty20 debut for Sydney Thunder during the 2018-19 Big Bash League season against the Melbourne Renegades, hitting 37 from 28 deliveries and adding 2 catches and a stumping. He made his first-class debut for New South Wales in the 2018–19 Sheffield Shield season on 20 March 2019.

Holt has been mentored by Southern Stars wicket-keeper Alyssa Healy and is studying for a bachelor's degree in sports science from the University of Technology and Science in Sydney. He made his List A debut on 24 November 2021, for New South Wales in the 2021–22 Marsh One-Day Cup.

In 2024, Holt moved to play for the Western Australia cricket team.

Holt was delisted by Western Australia at the end of the 2025-26 season, having played One-Day cricket for the state, but having never played first-class cricket.
