= Matthew Kelly (cricketer) =

Australian cricketer

Matt Kelly
Personal information
- Full name: Matthew Kelly
- Born: 7 December 1994 (age 31); Claremont, Western Australia
- Batting: Right-handed
- Bowling: Right-arm fast-medium
- Role: Bowler

Domestic team information
- Years: Team
- 2017/18–2025/26: Western Australia
- 2017/18–2025/26: Perth Scorchers
- 2022: Northamptonshire

Career statistics
Competition	FC	LA	T20
Matches	59	29	42
Runs scored	968	122	104
Batting average	16.40	10.16	11.55
100s/50s	0/1	0/0	0/0
Top score	89	33	23*
Balls bowled	10,650	1,301	895
Wickets	180	34	60
Bowling average	27.43	32.76	20.85
5 wickets in innings	8	0	0
10 wickets in match	0	0	0
Best bowling	6/49	4/25	4/25
Catches/stumpings	22/–	17/–	13/–
- Source: ESPNcricinfo, 20 May 2026

Matthew Kelly (born 7 December 1994) is a former Australian professional cricketer. He made his List A debut for Western Australia on 7 October 2017 in the 2017–18 JLT One-Day Cup.

In 2013 he played for the Australia Under-19 team against India, New Zealand, Zimbabwe and South Africa. He was awarded a rookie contract with the Western Australia cricket team in April 2016. He made his first-class debut for Western Australia in the 2017–18 Sheffield Shield season on 26 October 2017.

Kelly was selected as a replacement player for the Perth Scorchers in January 2018 when Andrew Tye was picked in the Australian national team. He made his Twenty20 debut in the Scorchers 3 run loss to Sydney Thunder, taking a wicket and a catch during the match. In April 2019, he was signed by the Indian Premier League (IPL) franchise the Kolkata Knight Riders. He replaced South African bowler Anrich Nortje, who was ruled out of the tournament by a shoulder injury. He was released by the Kolkata Knight Riders ahead of the 2020 IPL auction.

Kelly retired from professional cricket following the 2025-26 season, at the age of 31, after a run of injuries.
