= Mackenzie Harvey =

Australian cricketer

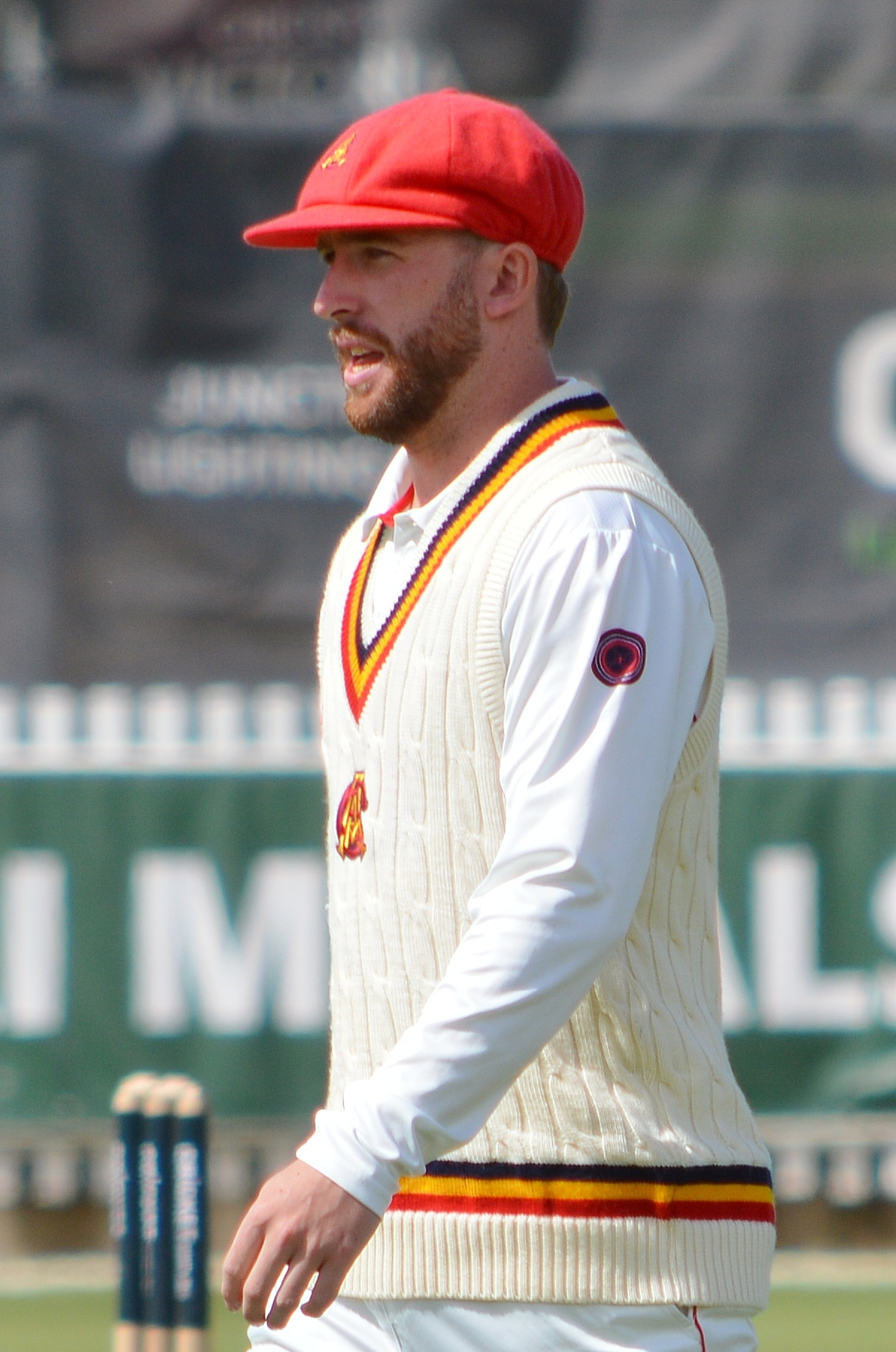
- Harvey playing First Class cricket with South Australia in March 2026

Personal information
- Full name: Mackenzie Walter Harvey
- Born: 18 September 2000 (age 26); East St Kilda, Victoria, Australia
- Batting: Left-handed
- Bowling: Right-arm medium
- Role: Top-order batter
- Relatives: Ian Harvey (uncle)

Domestic team information
- Years: Team
- 2018/19–2022/23: Victoria (squad no. 15)
- 2018/19–2024/25: Melbourne Renegades (squad no. 3)
- 2024/25–present: South Australia (squad no. 15)
- 2025/26–present: Adelaide Strikers (squad no. 15)

Career statistics
Competition	FC	List A	T20
Matches	6	34	51
Runs scored	184	1,164	765
Batting average	20.44	38.80	18.65
100s/50s	0/1	2/8	0/2
Top score	62*	134*	71*
Balls bowled	–	56	-
Wickets	–	1	-
Bowling average	–	71.00	-
5 wickets in innings	–	0	-
10 wickets in match	–	0	-
Best bowling	–	1/7	-
Catches/stumpings	5/–	14/–	10/–
- Source: ESPNcricinfo, 18 October 2026

Mackenzie Walter Harvey (born 18 September 2000) is an Australian cricketer. A left-handed batter, he is regarded as one of the best fielders in Australia, often fielding as a substitute for the national team. He is a nephew of former Australian cricketer Ian Harvey.

== Career ==
In December 2017, Harvey scored 136 runs in his first match for the Australia national under-19 cricket team against a touring Pakistan team. In January 2018, he was selected to play for Cricket Australia XI in a tour match against an England XI as part of the England tour of Australia, he scored 59 runs from 48 balls. Later that month, he was drafted in by the Melbourne Renegades as a replacement player for Aaron Finch for 2017–18 Big Bash League season, but did not play.

He made his List A debut for Victoria in the 2018–19 JLT One-Day Cup on 26 September 2018. He made his Twenty20 debut for Melbourne Renegades in the 2018–19 Big Bash League season on 29 December 2018.

In December 2019, he was named in Australia's squad for the 2020 Under-19 Cricket World Cup. Initially, Australia did not name a captain of their squad, however Harvey was officially named as the team captain just ahead of their opening match.

Harvey was selected as part of the San Francisco Unicorns squad ahead of the 2023 Major League Cricket season. He was resigned by the team for the 2024 Major League Cricket season.

In April 2024, Harvey signed with South Australia ahead of the 2024/25 season. On 6 November, he scored his maiden List A century against Victoria, scoring an unbeaten 134 runs from 110 balls.

In March 2026, Harvey opened the batting in the Sheffield Shield final, being part of the South Australian side that went on to win the trophy.
