= Josh Lalor =

Australian cricketer

Personal information
- Full name: Joshua Kendall Lalor
- Born: 2 November 1987 (age 39); Mount Druitt, New South Wales, Australia
- Height: 1.78 m (5 ft 10 in)
- Batting: Right-handed
- Bowling: Left-arm fast-medium
- Role: Bowler

Domestic team information
- Years: Team
- 2011/12–2015/16: New South Wales
- 2011/12: Perth Scorchers
- 2012/13–2013/14: Sydney Sixers (squad no. 2)
- 2014/15: Sydney Thunder (squad no. 2)
- 2015/16–2019/20: Brisbane Heat (squad no. 2)
- 2016/17: Cricket Australia XI
- 2020/21: Melbourne Renegades (squad no. 11)
- FC debut: 25 November 2011 New South Wales v Western Australia
- Last FC: 6 November 2015 New South Wales v Victoria
- LA debut: 20 November 2011 New South Wales v Queensland
- Last LA: 6 October 2014 New South Wales v Queensland

Career statistics
| Competition | FC | LA | T20 |
|---|---|---|---|
| Matches | 9 | 7 | 65 |
| Runs scored | 94 | 45 | 140 |
| Batting average | 13.42 | 22.50 | 7.77 |
| 100s/50s | 0/0 | 0/0 | 0/0 |
| Top score | 29* | 26 | 14 |
| Balls bowled | 1,403 | 408 | 1,318 |
| Wickets | 22 | 5 | 66 |
| Bowling average | 35.81 | 79.20 | 27.96 |
| 5 wickets in innings | 1 | 0 | 1 |
| 10 wickets in match | 0 | 0 | 0 |
| Best bowling | 5/97 | 2/60 | 5/26 |
| Catches/stumpings | 0/– | 3/– | 20/– |
- Source: CricInfo, 22 October 2022

Joshua Kendall Lalor (born 2 November 1987) is an Australian cricketer who plays for New South Wales and Melbourne Renegades.

Lalor, who has Aboriginal Australian ancestry, was born in Mount Druitt, New South Wales. He is a marketing graduate of the University of Western Sydney.

== Playing career ==
Lalor made his debut for New South Wales in a List A match on 20 November 2011, making his first-class debut five days later. In the T20 Big Bash League, Lalor has represented five different teams including the Perth Scorchers, the Sydney Sixers, the Sydney Thunder, and the Brisbane Heat. During the 2018–19 Big Bash League season, while playing for the Heat, Lalor took a hat trick against the Perth Scorchers on 1 February 2019.
