= Steve O'Keefe =

Australian cricketer

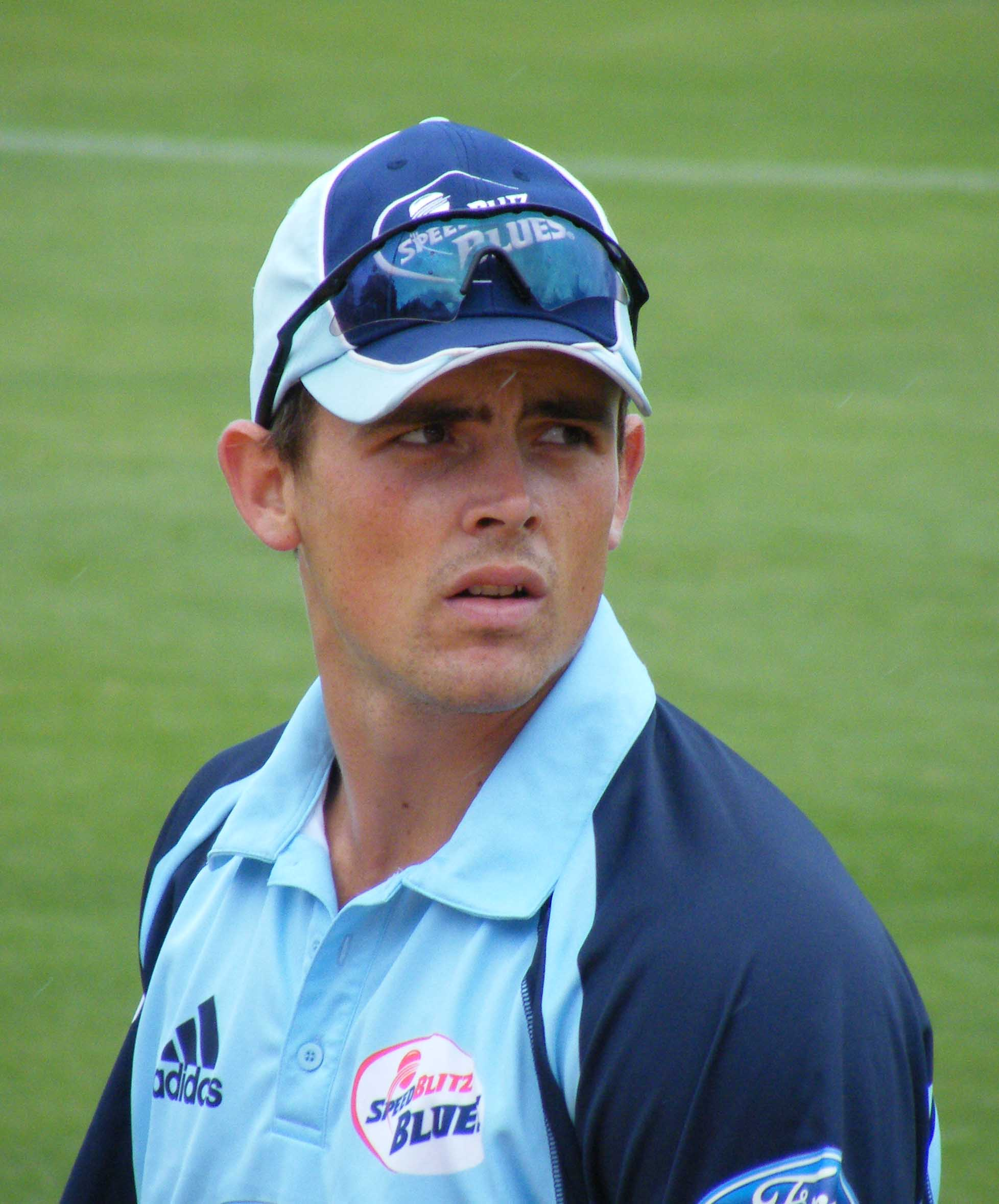
- O'Keefe in November 2008

Personal information
- Full name: Stephen Norman John O'Keefe
- Born: 9 December 1984 (age 41); Penang, Malaysia
- Nickname: Sock (SOK), Sango
- Height: 1.75 m (5 ft 9 in)
- Batting: Right-handed
- Bowling: Slow left-arm orthodox
- Role: All-rounder

International information
- National side: Australia (2010–2017)
- Test debut (cap 439): 22 October 2014 v Pakistan
- Last Test: 4 September 2017 v Bangladesh
- T20I debut (cap 46): 6 July 2010 v Pakistan
- Last T20I: 16 October 2011 v South Africa
- T20I shirt no.: 72

Domestic team information
- Years: Team
- 2005/06–2019/20: New South Wales (squad no. 72)
- 2011/12–2023/24: Sydney Sixers (squad no. 72)

Career statistics
Competition	Test	T20I	FC	LA
Matches	9	7	88	53
Runs scored	86	32	2,356	612
Batting average	9.55	6.40	25.60	21.85
100s/50s	0/0	0/0	0/12	0/1
Top score	25	22	99	70*
Balls bowled	2,228	114	17,646	2,162
Wickets	35	6	301	30
Bowling average	29.40	24.83	24.66	58.43
5 wickets in innings	2	0	13	0
10 wickets in match	1	0	4	0
Best bowling	6/35	3/29	8/77	3/65
Catches/stumpings	0/–	1/–	32/–	22/–
- Source: ESPNcricinfo, 10 December 2019

Stephen Norman John O'Keefe (born 9 December 1984) is a former Australian cricketer who played for the Australian national team in Test matches and Twenty20 Internationals, and a commentator for SEN and Nine. O'Keefe was formerly the captain of the New South Wales Sheffield Shield team.

== Personal life ==
O'Keefe was born on 9 December 1984 in Malaysia to Stephen, who worked for the Royal Australian Air Force, and Jan, a nurse. His father was stationed in Malaysia at the time of his birth. The family, which also includes O'Keefe's sister Rebekah, later moved to Sale, Victoria and then to Richmond, New South Wales. O'Keefe taught at the Richmond High School during his early cricket career.

On 8 August 2016, Steve O'Keefe was fined $10,000 by Cricket Australia after being issued with a criminal infringement notice by New South Wales Police following an incident at a Sydney hotel on 6 August 2016.

O'Keefe was later fined $20,000 and suspended from the domestic Matador Cup following an alcohol-fueled incident in April 2017, in which he was reported to have made 'highly inappropriate comments' to New South Wales Breakers cricketer Rachael Haynes and her partner at Cricket NSW's Steve Waugh Medal function.

== Domestic career ==
O'Keefe played as a spin bowler for the Sydney Sixers. He was also a handy batsman, and used to open the batting for the Sixers. O'Keefe picked up the first wicket for the 2016–17 Big Bash League season, taking the wicket of Sydney Thunder opening batsmen Kurtis Patterson who was caught by Doug Bollinger. O'Keefe is best known in the big bash during its fourth edition when he hit a last ball boundary of the bowling of Josh Lalor, to win a thriller against the Sydney Thunder which was Brett lee's final match at the Sydney Cricket Ground.

O'Keefe made his First-Class debut for New South Wales against Tasmania in November 2005. O'Keefe took 2 wickets and scored 10 runs on debut. His first scoring shot was a six.

O'Keefe did not play first class cricket again until November 2009. Against Tasmania he took 3–101. That summer he took 15 first class wickets at an average of 30.93, making him one of the better performing spinners in Australia. He also made 247 runs at an average of 61.75.

In 2010–11 O'Keefe took 26 first class wickets at 20.57 with a best of 4–65. This saw him discussed as an international prospect, as Australian spin stocks were thin at the time. The Australian selectors dropped Nathan Hauritz but used Xavier Doherty, Michael Beer and Steve Smith as spinners. O'Keefe was picked to play for Australia A.

When the touring team for Sri Lanka and South Africa in late 2011 was picked, O'Keefe was overlooked in favour of Nathan Lyon. Lyon's strong performances saw him establish himself as Australia's first-choice spinner.

O'Keefe struggled in 2011–12 only taking 9 first class wickets at an average of 52. The following summer was better – O'Keefe took 24 wickets at an average of 22.2. This made him the second highest wicket taking spinner in Australia, after Nathan Lyon but at a much better average. He was considered a possibility as a backup spinner to Lyon on the 2013 tour of India. However he was overlooked in favour of Xavier Doherty, who had taken two first class wickets that summer, and batting all rounder Glenn Maxwell, who had taken nine. He also missed selection on the 2013 Ashes in favour of Ashton Agar.

O'Keefe's omission at international level was confusing to many. According to one report:

Over time there have been a range of reasons available on the rumour mill. He just bowls darts, some said. He's too chippy, was another explanation thrown out there. Yet another was a personality clash with an influential figure in the Australian set-up. The clash was very much true, but it being a reason for him being overlooked was only ever a theory. Whether his cause was further harmed, too, by his occasional bucking of the old-school maxim that you don't question selectors is unknown, too.

In 2013–14 O'Keefe took 41 first class wickets at 20.43 including a best of 6–70. He finished the 2013/14 domestic Sheffield Shield season as the leading wicket taker for the NSW Blues, just edging out Western Australia's Jason Behrendorff. He was picked on the 2014 tour of the UAE to play Pakistan. Kerry O'Keeffe (no relation) said at the time:

It is a reward for some of the stuff he has done over the past two years. His numbers are undeniable so they obviously misread him somehow. They have been forced to pick him as he has kept putting them in the book... I think they had a perception of him that didn’t quite fit and the only way to change that perception was to take wickets. He has fought against a perception and broken it down. This should be his reward.

O'Keefe made his Test debut.

In 2014–15 O'Keefe took 28 first class wickets at 23.21 with a best of 5–24. He was overlooked for selection on the 2015 tours of the West Indies and England in favour of Fawad Ahmed, who ultimately ended up playing no Tests. In 2015 he toured India with Australia A, taking 14 wickets at 20.07 with a best return of 6–82.

In 2015–16 O'Keefe took 20 first class wickets at 24.10. The Kochi Tuskers Kerala picked him up at the Indian Premier League auction for $20,000. In Sydney Grade Cricket he plays for Manly Warringah, although he originally played for Hawkesbury.

In April 2020, New South Wales did not renew his contract to play in the Sheffield Shield, O’Keefe announcing his retirement from first-class and List A cricket. However, O'Keefe continued to play for the Sydney Sixers in the Big Bash League. O'Keefe won three BBL titles with the Sydney Sixers throughout his playing time with them. On 10 January 2024, O’Keefe announced his retirement from professional cricket announcing he would cease playing at the end of the 2023/24 Big Bash League season. In his final season he helped to guide the Sydney Sixers to another final. Taking 8 wickets in 9 matches, his final wicket being in a losing effort in the Big Bash Final, against the Brisbane Heat.

== International career ==
O'Keefe was called up to the Australian Test team to replace the injured Nathan Hauritz for the series against Pakistan in England, but did not play in the Tests. He made his Twenty20 international debut during the England tour. In the lead-up to the 2010–11 Ashes series, O'Keefe performed impressively taking 4/88 for 'Australia-A' in a tour game against a full strength English batting line up in Hobart. These figures would remain the best by an Australian spinner all summer.

However he was consistently overlooked in favour of other spinners. In 2013 selector John Inverarity said "Steve O'Keefe is a very good cricketer. He's taken wickets, and he's a steady batsman. Whenever we've been at the selection table, we've marginally preferred other players to him. But he's still regarded as a good cricketer. We're very aware of his figures and we do look deeper than that. But there's a panel of five of us and there's a consistency of view when we select the spinners."

He made his Test match debut for Australia against Pakistan in the United Arab Emirates on 22 October 2014. He was Australian Test Cap number 439. O'Keefe took 2/107 in the first innings and 2/112 in the second, claiming Asad Shafiq as his first Test victim.

In Australia's second innings of the first Test versus Sri Lanka at Pallakele in 2016, Stephen O'Keefe along with Peter Nevill set the record for the slowest partnership for any wicket in Test history, scoring 4 runs from 178 balls/29.4 overs with a scoring run rate of just 0.13 runs per over, which is also the lowest spanning at least 100 or more balls. O'Keefe scored those four crucial runs, a boundary. After this match, O'Keefe had to return home due to an injury to his hamstring.

On 24 February 2017, he took his first 5-wicket haul in a Test match, against India at the Maharashtra Cricket Association Stadium, 6/35 where India were all out for 105 runs in the first innings. At the time, this was India's worst collapse in any Test match, losing their last seven wickets for eleven runs. He then repeated the same figures (6/35) in the second inning a day later, as Australia won by 333 runs. His match figures of 12/70 were the second best bowling by a visiting bowler in a Test in India. This was the second time in the history of Test cricket that a bowler had recorded six wickets and an identical number of runs in both innings of a Test after B. S. Chandrasekhar of India, who had figures of 6/52 in both innings in 1977, coincidentally against Australia at the MCG, with O'Keefe's figures setting the record for the best identical bowling figures in Test history.

== Career best performances ==
	Bowling			
	Score	Fixture	Venue	Season
Test	6/35	Australia v India	Maharashtra Cricket Association Stadium, Pune	2017
T20I	3/29	Australia v Pakistan	Edgbaston, Birmingham	2010
FC	8/77	New South Wales v Victoria	Junction Oval, Melbourne	2018
LA	3/65	Queensland v New South Wales	Gabba, Brisbane	2012
T20	3/13	Sydney Sixers v Sydney Thunder	Sydney Cricket Ground, Sydney	2024

== See also ==
- List of Test cricketers born in non-Test playing nations
