= Jordan Silk =

Australian cricketer

Personal information
- Full name: Jordan Christopher Silk
- Born: 13 April 1992 (age 34); Penrith, New South Wales, Australia
- Height: 187 cm (6 ft 2 in)
- Batting: Right-handed
- Bowling: Right-arm medium
- Role: Middle-order batter

Domestic team information
- Years: Team
- 2012/13–present: Tasmania (squad no. 21)
- 2013/14–present: Sydney Sixers (squad no. 14)

Career statistics
Competition	FC	LA	T20
Matches	114	78	141
Runs scored	6,468	2,408	2,437
Batting average	32.17	35.41	30.84
100s/50s	13/35	2/19	0/8
Top score	181	142	78
Balls bowled	287	42	–
Wickets	2	0	–
Bowling average	80.00	–	–
5 wickets in innings	0	0	–
10 wickets in match	0	–	–
Best bowling	1/4	–	–
Catches/stumpings	92/–	42/–	88/–
- Source: ESPNcricinfo, 25 October 2026

Jordan Christopher Silk (born 13 April 1992) is an Australian cricketer who plays for Tasmania. Silk was recruited from Sydney grade cricket, where he holds the record for being the youngest player to make a century on debut.

Silk fielded as a substitute for Australia against Sri Lanka in Hobart on 16 December 2012, and caught Nuwan Kulasekara off the bowling of Nathan Lyon.

== Domestic career ==
Silk made his first class debut against Queensland, on 7 March 2013. In his second game, he made a century to help Tasmania into the Sheffield Shield final. In the final, Silk again scored a century, to help Tasmania win its third title.

In April 2013, Silk was selected as part of the Australia A cricket team to tour England.

In 2016, Silk spent a season with Cuckfield Cricket Club, and racked up 947 runs for the club in the Sussex Premier League.

In 2024, Silk played for Brentwood Cricket Club in the Essex Premier League, as Brentwood won the ECB National Club Championship.

== Big Bash League ==
Silk currently plays for the Sydney Sixers franchise from the 2013–14 Big Bash League season. He was awarded the Bradman Young Cricketer of the Year at the Allan Border Medal ceremony by the CA in 2014.

== Career best performances ==
	Batting			
	Score	Fixture	Venue	Season
FC	127	Tasmania v Victoria	Bellerive Oval, Hobart	2012/13
LA	87	Tasmania v South Australia	Karen Rolton Oval, Adelaide	2019/20
T20	69*	Sydney Thunder v Sydney Sixers	SCG, Sydney	2014/15
