= Cameron Boyce (cricketer) =

Australian cricketer (born 1989)

Personal information
- Full name: Cameron John Boyce
- Born: 27 July 1989 (age 37); Charleville, Queensland, Australia
- Batting: Right-handed
- Bowling: Right-arm leg break
- Role: Bowler

International information
- National side: Australia (2014–2016)
- T20I debut: 5 October 2014 v Pakistan
- Last T20I: 31 January 2016 v India

Domestic team information
- Years: Team
- 2009/10–2015/16: Queensland
- 2012/13, 2022/23–present: Adelaide Strikers
- 2014/15–2017/18: Hobart Hurricanes
- 2016/17–2017/18: Tasmania
- 2018/19–2021/22: Melbourne Renegades

Career statistics
Competition	T20I	FC	LA	T20
Matches	7	48	48	112
Runs scored	4	960	229	331
Batting average	4.00	17.14	13.47	10.34
100s/50s	0/0	0/5	0/1	0/1
Top score	3	66	52	51*
Balls bowled	138	7,580	2,144	2,349
Wickets	8	96	55	121
Bowling average	19.00	49.92	35.61	24.27
5 wickets in innings	0	3	0	1
10 wickets in match	0	0	0	0
Best bowling	2/10	7/68	4/21	5/21
Catches/stumpings	0/–	30/–	21/–	14/–
- Source: ESPNcricinfo, 29 January 2025

Cameron John Boyce (born 27 July 1989) is an Australian cricketer. He is a right-arm leg break bowler who has played for several domestic teams in Australia and has appeared in seven T20I matches for the Australian cricket team.

Boyce began playing cricket for his home state of Queensland in the 2009/10 summer. He was dropped from Queensland's team and moved to Tasmania in 2016, before being dropped again by Tasmania in 2018. He has also played in the Big Bash League (BBL) for the Adelaide Strikers, the Hobart Hurricanes, and the Melbourne Renegades, winning the competition with the Renegades in the 2018–19 season.

== Early life and career ==
Boyce was born in the western Queensland town of Charleville. Before moving to Tasmania, Boyce played senior cricket for Toombul District Cricket Club in Brisbane.

Boyce made his debut for Queensland against Western Australia at the Gabba in March 2010. The following week he played in the season's Sheffield Shield Final. Queensland lost, but Boyce took six wickets in Victoria's second innings. After being selected for the Australian Chairman's XI team for a match against the visiting Indians in Canberra in 2011, former Test spinner Ashley Mallett claimed that Boyce was the best leg spinner he had seen in first class cricket since Shane Warne, saying Boyce had "definitely got the potential to play Test cricket."

In the Big Bash League (BBL), Boyce played first for the South Australian-based Adelaide Strikers in the 2012–13 season, then for the Tasmanian-based Hobart Hurricanes from 2014 onwards. He was dropped from the Queensland squad at the end of the 2015/16 season and moved to Tasmania to play for their state team.

== International career ==
Boyce made his Twenty20 International (T20I) debut for Australia against Pakistan in the United Arab Emirates in October 2014. He took two wickets for ten runs in a low-scoring game. Boyce played in the T20I match between England and Australia in Cardiff on 31 August 2015. He flew in from Brisbane for the one-off match, where he bowled one over and was not required to bat. This was Boyce's fifth T20I in a row for Australia, meaning he had played in every T20I the team had played since the 2014 ICC World Twenty20. Boyce also played for Australia A during the 2015 off-season, when the team toured India.

Boyce performed well for the Hobart Hurricanes in the 2015–16 BBL season, where he bowled primarily in the middle overs of the game and consistently took wickets. As a result of his performances for both Australia and the Hurricanes, as well as his experience playing in India, he was included in Australia's squad for the 2016 ICC World Twenty20 in India as one of the team's two spin bowlers alongside Nathan Lyon.

== Later cricket career ==
Boyce played well for Tasmania in one-day competitions, After playing in every match of the regular season, he was dropped from the team and didn't play in the finals. His contracts with Tasmania and the Hurricanes were not renewed at the end of the season and he moved back to Brisbane.

On 8 June 2018, it was announced that Boyce had signed a two-year deal for the Melbourne Renegades in the BBL. His first season with the Renegades was successful. He played for the team in the season final, where he took the two wickets of the Melbourne Stars' opening batters, starting a catastrophic batting collapse that led to a Renegades win. On 19 January 2022, in the 2021–22 BBL season, Boyce became the first bowler to take four wickets in four consecutive deliveries in the BBL.

Boyce returned to the Adelaide Strikers, his first BBL team, for the 2022–23 BBL season.
