= 2024–25 Sheffield Shield season =

Cricket tournament

2024–25 Sheffield Shield
- Dates: 8 October 2024 – 29 March 2025
- Administrator: Cricket Australia
- Cricket format: First-class
- Tournament format(s): Double round-robin and final
- Champions: South Australia (14th title)
- Participants: 6
- Matches: 31
- Player of the series: Fergus O'Neill (Victoria)
- Most runs: Jake Weatherald (Tasmania) (906)
- Most wickets: Nathan McAndrew (South Australia) (40)
- Official website: 2024–25 Sheffield Shield

The 2024–25 Sheffield Shield season was the 123rd season of the Australian inter-state domestic first-class cricket competition. Cricket Australia revealed the season fixtures in July of 2024. The season started on 8 October 2024 and the final was played on 26 March 2025. South Australia won the title, beating Queensland by 4 wickets in front of a large crowd at Karen Rolton Oval and breaking a 29-year drought.

== Points table ==
See the Sheffield Shield points system. South Australia clinched top spot after Round 9, and hosted the final.

Pos	Team	Pld	W	L	D	A	BP	DP	Pts
1	South Australia	10	6	1	3	0	16.61	0	55.61
2	Queensland	10	3	3	4	0	17.76	0	39.76
3	Victoria	10	4	5	1	0	14.49	0	39.49
4	New South Wales	10	3	4	3	0	15.39	0	36.39
5	Tasmania	10	3	5	2	0	15.92	0	35.92
6	Western Australia	10	3	4	3	0	14.43	0	35.43
Source: ESPNcricinfo, Cricket.com.au

== Round–robin ==
Visitor team →	NSW	QLD	SA	TAS	VIC	WA
Home team ↓	NSW	QLD	SA	TAS	VIC	WA
New South Wales		Match drawn	Match drawn	Tasmania; 55 runs	NSW; 76 runs	NSW; Inns & 68 runs
Queensland	Queensland; 188 runs		SA; 129 runs	Match drawn	Victoria; 90 runs	WA; Inns & 12 runs
South Australia	NSW; Inns & 1 run	Match drawn		SA; 87 runs	SA; 138 runs	Match drawn
Tasmania	Tasmania; 326 runs	Queensland; 9 wickets	SA; 2 runs		Tasmania; 20 runs	WA; Inns & 45 runs
Victoria	Victoria; 141 runs	Queensland; 23 runs	SA; 4 wickets	Match drawn		Victoria; 8 wickets
Western Australia	Match drawn	Match drawn	SA; 6 wickets	WA; 6 wickets	Victoria; 34 runs	

Home team won	Visitor team won

- Note: Results listed are according to the home (horizontal) and visitor (vertical) teams.
- Note: Click on a result to see a summary of the match.

=== Round 1 ===
8–11 October 2024
Scorecard

(home team) New South Wales	v	South Australia
366 (99 overs); Sam Konstas 152 (241); Lloyd Pope 3/69 (12 overs)		260 (86.3 overs); Alex Carey 90 (85); Nathan Lyon 5/47 (24.3 overs)
6/282d (78 overs); Sam Konstas 105 (225); Jordan Buckingham 3/48 (14 overs)		5/309 (110 overs); Nathan McSweeney 127* (283); Nathan Lyon 3/94 (39 overs)

Match drawn
Cricket Central, Sydney
Umpires: Phillip Gillespie and Michael Graham-Smith
Player of the match: Sam Konstas (New South Wales)

- New South Wales won the toss and elected to bat.
- Sam Konstas (New South Wales) scored his maiden century in first-class cricket.
- Points: New South Wales 3.66, South Australia 2.60

8–11 October 2024
Scorecard

(home team) Victoria	v	Tasmania
9/428d (116.3 overs); Marcus Harris 143 (179); Gabe Bell 3/63 (23 overs)		9/527d (167 overs); Beau Webster 113 (183); Mitchell Perry 3/79 (23 overs)
2/120 (52 overs); Marcus Harris 52 (70); Kieran Elliott 1/19 (7 overs)

Match drawn
Junction Oval, Melbourne
Umpires: Shawn Craig and Donovan Koch
Player of the match: Marcus Harris (Victoria)

- Tasmania won the toss and elected to field.
- Tom Rogers (Victoria) made his first-class debut.
- Points: Victoria 3.00, Tasmania 2.66

8–11 October 2024
Scorecard

(home team) Western Australia	v	Queensland
465 (124.2 overs); Josh Inglis 122 (117); Michael Neser 5/68 (25 overs)		367 (112.2 overs); Jack Clayton 85 (194); Cameron Gannon 5/57 (26.2 overs)
6/263d (68 overs); Mitchell Marsh 94 (142); Jack Wildermuth 3/38 (14 overs)		1/120 (35 overs); Usman Khawaja 64* (97); Matthew Kelly 1/27 (9 overs)

Match drawn
WACA Ground, Perth
Umpires: Gerard Abood and Sam Nogajski
Player of the match: Josh Inglis (Western Australia)

- Queensland won the toss and elected to field.
- Tom Straker (Queensland) made his first-class debut.
- Points: Western Australia 3.45, Queensland 2.96

=== Round 2 ===
20–23 October 2024
Scorecard

(home team) Victoria	v	New South Wales
272 (96.2 overs); Peter Handscomb 64 (112); Sean Abbott 5/62 (22.2 overs)		136 (53.5 overs); Josh Philippe 45* (96); Will Sutherland 3/24 (10 overs)
246 (61.5 overs); Sam Harper 72 (99); Mitchell Starc 6/81 (17.5 overs)		241 (77.2 overs); Josh Philippe 88 (123); Sam Elliott 4/44 (14.2 overs)

Victoria won by 141 runs
Melbourne Cricket Ground, Melbourne
Umpires: Phillip Gillespie and Sam Nogajski
Player of the match: Fergus O'Neill (Victoria)

- New South Wales won the toss and elected to field.
- Points: Victoria 7.72, New South Wales 1

20–23 October 2024
Scorecard

South Australia	v	Queensland (home team)
314 (100.5 overs); Henry Hunt 136 (314); Tom Whitney 5/57 (19 overs)		308 (72.3 overs); Jimmy Peirson 94 (119); Nathan McAndrew 3/55 (19 overs)
9/352d (94 overs); Alex Carey 123* (163); Tom Whitney 3/62 (11 overs)		229 (73.3 overs); Jack Clayton 91 (164); Nathan McAndrew 5/38 (18 overs)

South Australia won by 129 runs
Allan Border Field, Brisbane
Umpires: Gerard Abood and Ben Treloar
Player of the match: Alex Carey (South Australia)

- Queensland won the toss and elected to field.
- Tom Whitney (Queensland) made his first-class debut.
- Points: South Australia 8.14, Queensland 1.98

20–23 October 2024
Scorecard

Tasmania	v	Western Australia (home team)
277 (87.3 overs); Mitchell Owen 69 (60); Corey Rocchiccioli 4/70 (24.3 overs)		332 (96.1 overs); Josh Inglis 101 (141); Riley Meredith 3/50 (22 overs)
137 (56.3 overs); Charlie Wakim 37 (74); Brody Couch 4/50 (12.3 overs)		4/83 (19.3 overs); Hilton Cartwright 39* (50); Kieran Elliott 3/22 (6 overs)

Western Australia won by 6 wickets
WACA Ground, Perth
Umpires: Donovan Koch and Michael Graham-Smith
Player of the match: Josh Inglis (Western Australia)

- Western Australia won the toss and elected to field.
- Points: Western Australia 8.32, Tasmania 1.77

=== Round 3 ===
1–4 November 2024
Scorecard

(home team) New South Wales	v	Queensland
239 (73.3 overs); Kurtis Patterson 91 (162); Angus Lovell 3/13 (4.3 overs)		5/406d (143.5 overs); Angus Lovell 146* (314); Ryan Hadley 2/63 (26.5 overs)
4/256 (82 overs); Oliver Davies 88 (135); Mitchell Swepson 2/83 (35 overs)

Match drawn
Cricket Central, Sydney
Umpires: Gerard Abood and Greg Davidson
Player of the match: Angus Lovell (Queensland)

- New South Wales won the toss and elected to bat.
- Only 27.1 overs were possible on Day 2 due to rain.
- Benji Floros (Queensland) made his first-class debut.
- Points: Queensland 2.50, New South Wales 1.69

1–4 November 2024
Scorecard

(home team) Tasmania	v	Western Australia
317 (112.3 overs); Mitchell Owen 83 (83); Joel Paris 4/45 (25 overs)		9/460d (161 overs); Hilton Cartwright 153 (278); Matthew Kuhnemann 5/100 (43 overs)
98 (67.5 overs); Bradley Hope 24 (99); Ashton Agar 3/12 (17.5 overs)

Western Australia won by an innings and 45 runs
Bellerive Oval, Hobart
Umpires: Andrew Crozier and Simon Lightbody
Player of the match: Hilton Cartwright (Western Australia)

- Western Australia won the toss and elected to field.
- Brody Couch became the first bowler to take hat-trick for Western Australia in the Sheffield Shield.
- Points: Western Australia 7.48, Tasmania 1.57

1–4 November 2024
Scorecard

(home team) South Australia	v	Victoria
307 (105.1 overs); Henry Hunt 62 (151); Peter Siddle 3/57 (23 overs)		232 (94.5 overs); Sam Harper 89 (136); Ben Manenti 5/73 (30.5 overs)
8/270d (73 overs); Ben Manenti 62* (71); Peter Siddle 4/63 (18 overs)		207 (101.5 overs); Campbell Kellaway 80 (228); Lloyd Pope 6/74 (30.5 overs)

South Australia won by 138 runs
Adelaide Oval, Adelaide
Umpires: Donovan Koch and Troy Penman
Player of the match: Ben Manenti (South Australia)

- Victoria won the toss and elected to field.
- Henry Thornton (South Australia) made his first-class debut.
- Points: South Australia 7.90, Victoria 1.22

=== Round 4 ===
14–16 November 2024
Scorecard

(home team) South Australia	v	New South Wales
110 (41.3 overs); Henry Hunt 30 (96); Jackson Bird 7/46 (15 overs)		394 (127 overs); Kurtis Patterson 71 (188); Nathan McAndrew 4/90 (31 overs)
283 (85.3 overs); Jake Lehmann 100 (163); Jack Edwards 4/41 (14 overs)

New South Wales won by an innings and 1 run
Karen Rolton Oval, Adelaide
Umpires: Greg Davidson and Simon Lightbody
Player of the match: Jackson Bird (New South Wales)

- South Australia won the toss and elected to bat.
- Lachlan Shaw (New South Wales) made his first-class debut.
- Points: New South Wales 7.98, South Australia 0.60

15–18 November 2024
Scorecard

Western Australia	v	Victoria (home team)
167 (60 overs); Joel Curtis 36 (72); Todd Murphy 4/37 (15 overs)		373 (112 overs); Thomas Rogers 76 (143); Joel Paris 3/44 (19 overs)
325 (135.3 overs); Joel Curtis 119* (239); Sam Elliott 4/47 (21.3 overs)		2/122 (23.2 overs); Peter Handscomb 56* (61); Corey Rocchiccioli 2/47 (9.2 overs)

Victoria won by 8 wickets
Junction Oval, Melbourne
Umpires: Eloise Sheridan and Ben Treolar
Player of the match: Fergus O'Neill (Victoria)

- Victoria won the toss and elected to field.
- Joel Curtis (Western Australia) scored his maiden century in first-class cricket.
- Corey Rocchiccioli (Western Australia) took a hat-trick. His first wicket was on the final ball of Victoria's first innings, with the final two coming from his first two balls of the second innings.
- Points: Victoria 8.22, Western Australia 0.80

15–18 November 2024
Scorecard

Tasmania	v	Queensland (home team)
461 (99.2 overs); Jake Weatherald 186 (204); Tom Straker 4/87 (24.2 overs)		291 (86.3 overs); Matt Renshaw 121 (224); Riley Meredith 3/53 (18 overs)
		5/225 (81 overs) (f/o); Ben McDermott 59* (144); Riley Meredith 3/39 (14 overs)

Match drawn
Allan Border Field, Brisbane
Umpires: Stephen Dionysius and Michael Graham-Smith
Player of the match: Jake Weatherald (Tasmania)

- Queensland won the toss and elected to field.
- Only 76 overs were possible on Day 1 due to bad light, and only 9.1 overs were possible on Day 2 due to rain.
- Points: Tasmania 4.61, Queensland 2.91

=== Round 5 ===
23–26 November 2024 (D/N)
Scorecard

Western Australia	v	South Australia (home team)
373 (112.5 overs); Jayden Goodwin 139 (272); Brendan Doggett 5/97 (28 overs)		253 (86 overs); Henry Hunt 106 (249); Joel Paris 5/34 (20 overs)
3/243d (80 overs); Cameron Bancroft 105* (255); Spencer Johnson 2/60 (18 overs)		6/208 (72.3 overs); Jake Lehmann 53 (65); Keaton Critchell 3/33 (11 overs)

Match drawn
Adelaide Oval, Adelaide
Umpires: Greg Davidson and Stephen Dionysius
Player of the match: Jayden Goodwin (Western Australia)

- South Australia won the toss and elected to field.
- Keaton Critchell (Western Australia) made his first-class debut.
- Points: Western Australia 3.15, South Australia 2.23

24–27 November 2024
Scorecard

Tasmania	v	New South Wales (home team)
364 (129.2 overs); Tim Ward 92 (246); Jackson Bird 3/58 (28 overs)		338 (93.4 overs); Kurtis Patterson 99 (163); Gabe Bell 4/52 (24 overs)
8/268d (70 overs); Tim Ward 96 (147); Sean Abbott 4/71 (16 overs)		239 (74.5 overs); Josh Philippe 55 (100); Matthew Kuhnemann 3/76 (30 overs)

Tasmania won by 55 runs
Sydney Cricket Ground, Sydney
Umpires: Claire Polosak and Ben Treolar
Player of the match: Tim Ward (Tasmania)

- New South Wales won the toss and elected to field.
- Points: Tasmania 7.61, New South Wales 1.78

24–27 November 2024 (D/N)
Scorecard

Victoria	v	Queensland (home team)
186 (51.5 overs); Matthew Short 54 (70); Mitchell Swepson 4/31 (12 overs)		297 (101.2 overs); Jimmy Peirson 61 (111); Xavier Crone 4/68 (20.2 overs)
439 (109.3 overs); Campbell Kellaway 122 (175); Liam Guthrie 4/96 (20.3 overs)		238 (79.4 overs); Ben McDermott 68 (151); Sam Elliott 4/43 (20 overs)

Victoria won by 90 runs
The Gabba, Brisbane
Umpires: Simon Lightbody and Troy Penman
Player of the match: Campbell Kellaway (Victoria)

- Victoria won the toss and elected to bat.
- Campbell Kellaway (Victoria) scored his first century in first-class cricket.
- Points: Victoria 6.9, Queensland 1.96

=== Round 6 ===
6–9 December 2024
Scorecard

Western Australia	v	New South Wales (home team)
211 (67 overs); Josh Inglis 41 (68); Jack Edwards 5/41 (17 overs)		9/463d (134 overs); Kurtis Patterson 167* (255); Brody Couch 3/66 (22 overs)
184 (101.5 overs); Cameron Bancroft 48 (148); Jack Edwards 5/41 (25.5 overs)

New South Wales won by innings and 68 runs
Sydney Cricket Ground, Sydney
Umpires: Greg Davidson and Troy Penman
Player of the match: Jack Edwards (New South Wales)

- Western Australia won the toss and elected to bat.
- Only 20 overs of play was possible on day 2 due to rain.
- Jack Edwards (New South Wales) took his first ten-wicket haul in first-class cricket.
- Points: New South Wales 8.09, Western Australia 0.71

6–9 December 2024
Scorecard

Queensland	v	Victoria (home team)
172 (54.3 overs); Matt Renshaw 59 (99); Mitchell Perry 5/33 (14 overs)		123 (54 overs); Marcus Harris 41 (112); Xavier Bartlett 5/32 (13 overs)
223 (69.4 overs); Jimmy Peirson 82 (147); Fergus O'Neill 4/22 (15.4 overs)		249 (89.5 overs); Peter Handscomb 78 (139); Mitchell Swepson 4/88 (30 overs)

Queensland won by 23 runs
Melbourne Cricket Ground, Melbourne
Umpires: Shawn Craig and Ben Treloar
Player of the match: Mark Steketee (Queensland)

- Victoria won the toss and elected to field.
- Points: Queensland 7, Victoria 1

6–9 December 2024
Scorecard

South Australia	v	Tasmania (home team)
6/398d (108 overs); Jason Sangha 151 (257); Riley Meredith 4/95 (20 overs)		203 (68.1 overs); Jake Doran 51 (79); Liam Scott 3/30 (13 overs)
9/233d (55 overs); Conor McInerney 75 (73); Matthew Kuhnemann 4/67 (20 overs)		426 (113 overs); Tim Ward 142 (288); Wes Agar 3/91 (25 overs)

South Australia won by 2 runs
Bellerive Oval, Hobart
Umpires: Michael Graham-Smith and Sharad Patel
Player of the match: Jason Sangha (South Australia)

- Tasmania won the toss and elected to field.
- Only 43 overs of play was possible on day 2 due to rain.
- Points: South Australia 8.46, Tasmania 0.43

=== Round 7 ===
8–11 February 2025
Scorecard

(home team) Tasmania	v	Victoria
236 (86.1 overs); Aidan O'Connor 53 (92); Peter Siddle 2/43 (21.1 overs)		258 (80 overs); Harry Dixon 66 (73); Kieran Elliott 4/55 (17 overs)
291 (82.2 overs); Jake Weatherald 155 (212); Fergus O'Neill 3/63 (19.2 overs)		249 (81.2 overs); Peter Handscomb 93 (161); Kieran Elliott 6/84 (28.1 overs)

Tasmania won by 20 runs
Bellerive Oval, Hobart
Umpires: Phillip Gillespie and Ben Treloar
Player of the match: Kieran Elliott (Tasmania)

- Victoria won the toss and elected to field.
- Raf MacMillan, Aidan O'Connor (Tasmania) and Harry Dixon (Victoria) all made their first-class debuts.
- Kieran Elliott (Tasmania) took his first five-wicket haul and ten-wicket haul in first-class cricket.
- Points: Tasmania 7.36, Victoria 1.58

8–11 February 2025
Scorecard

(home team) Queensland	v	New South Wales
387 (107.3 overs); Jack Clayton 134 (258); Liam Hatcher 4/92 (20.3 overs)		259 (81.4 overs); Jack Edwards 108 (148); Xavier Bartlett 4/54 (17.4 overs)
3/289d (63.4 overs); Matt Renshaw 125* (174); Ross Pawson 1/52 (13 overs)		229 (94 overs); Josh Philippe 80 (143); Michael Neser 3/72 (21 overs)

Queensland won by 188 runs
The Gabba, Brisbane
Umpires: Shawn Craig and Andrew Crozier
Player of the match: Jack Clayton (New South Wales)

- New South Wales won the toss and elected to field.
- Hanno Jacobs and Ross Pawson (New South Wales) both made their first-class debuts.
- Points: Queensland 8.44, New South Wales 1.29

8–9 February 2025
Scorecard

(home team) Western Australia	v	South Australia
120 (42.4 overs); Sam Fanning 49 (94); Liam Scott 3/10 (8.4 overs)		124 (40.2 overs); Jason Sangha 45 (81); Brody Couch 4/33 (9 overs)
66 (26.3 overs); Ashton Turner 30 (36); Nathan McAndrew 7/11 (9.3 overs)		4/66 (17.4 overs); Jason Sangha 24* (43); Brody Couch 1/4 (2 overs)

South Australia won by 6 wickets
WACA Ground, Perth
Umpires: Donovan Koch and Simon Lightbody
Player of the match: Nathan McAndrew (South Australia)

- South Australia won the toss and elected to field.
- 763 balls were bowled throughout the match, the lowest total in an outright result in Sheffield Shield history.
- Points: South Australia 7, Western Australia 1

=== Round 8 ===
18–20 February 2025
Scorecard

(home team) New South Wales	v	Victoria
238 (65.2 overs); Oliver Davies 89 (94); Scott Boland 4/56 (14 overs)		182 (60.1 overs); Harry Dixon 38 (27); Jackson Bird 3/24 (10 overs)
174 (69 overs); Matthew Gilkes 49 (130); Scott Boland 6/46 (21 overs)		154 (38.4 overs); Todd Murphy 40* (32); Jackson Bird 5/68 (15 overs)

New South Wales won by 76 runs
Sydney Cricket Ground, Sydney
Umpires: Michael Graham-Smith and Simon Lightbody
Player of the match: Jackson Bird (New South Wales)

- New South Wales won the toss and elected to bat.
- Points: New South Wales 7.38, Victoria 1

18–20 February 2025
Scorecard

(home team) Queensland	v	Western Australia
147 (53.4 overs); Ben McDermott 37 (113); Corey Rocchiccioli 7/52 (15.4 overs)		312 (114 overs); Sam Fanning 95 (229); Michael Neser 4/34 (21 overs)
153 (58.4 overs); Lachlan Hearne 33 (65); Lance Morris 3/35 (13 overs)

Western Australia won by an innings and 12 runs
The Gabba, Brisbane
Umpires: Sam Nogajski and Claire Polosak
Player of the match: Corey Rocchiccioli (Western Australia)

- Queensland won the toss and elected to bat.
- Hugo Burdon (Queensland) made his first-class debut.
- Corey Rocchiccioli (Western Australia) took his first five-wicket haul in first-class cricket.
- Points: Western Australia 7.72, Queensland 0.7

18–21 February 2025
Scorecard

(home team) South Australia	v	Tasmania
93 (47.2 overs); Jason Sangha 28 (68); Kieran Elliott 6/23 (13.2 overs)		101 (33.4 overs); Beau Webster 28 (45); Brendan Doggett 6/40 (12.4 overs)
388 (132.4 overs); Jason Sangha 75 (201); Riley Meredith 3/81 (29.4 overs)		293 (98 overs); Nivethan Radhakrishnan 68* (243); Lloyd Pope 4/76 (20 overs)

South Australia won by 87 runs
Adelaide Oval, Adelaide
Umpires: Phillip Gillespie and Eloise Sheridan
Player of the match: Brendan Doggett (South Australia)

- South Australia won the toss and elected to bat.
- Points: South Australia 7, Tasmania 1

=== Round 9 ===
6–9 March 2025
Scorecard

(home team) Victoria	v	South Australia
285 (69.5 overs); Campbell Kellaway 79 (137); Henry Thornton 4/42 (12.5 overs)		283 (94.2 overs); Nathan McSweeney 60 (199); Fergus O'Neill 5/51 (28.2 overs)
297 (88.2 overs); Campbell Kellaway 77 (190); Liam Scott 4/49 (14.2 overs)		6/300 (96.3 overs); Jake Lehmann 105* (193); Scott Boland 3/69 (20 overs)

South Australia won by 4 wickets
Junction Oval, Melbourne
Umpires: Phillip Gillespie and Michael Graham-Smith
Player of the match: Jake Lehmann (South Australia)

- South Australia won the toss and elected to field.
- Points: South Australia 7.83, Victoria 1.85

6–9 March 2025
Scorecard

Queensland	v	Tasmania (home team)
9/425d (116.5 overs); Usman Khawaja 127 (221); Beau Webster 3/71 (23 overs)		161 (52.4 overs); Jake Weatherald 55 (78); Michael Neser 6/37 (15 overs)
1/82 (25.4 overs); Jack Clayton 34* (71); Riley Meredith 1/26 (8 overs)		345 (94.4 overs) (f/o); Jake Weatherald 71 (81); Mark Steketee 3/87 (23 overs)

Queensland won by 9 wickets
Bellerive Oval, Hobart
Umpires: Shawn Craig and Sam Nogajski
Player of the match: Michael Neser (Queensland)

- Tasmania won the toss and elected to field.
- Points: Queensland 8.35, Tasmania 0.6

6–9 March 2025
Scorecard

(home team) Western Australia	v	New South Wales
196 (68.3 overs); Ashton Turner 42 (51); Jackson Bird 3/22 (16)		261 (108.3 overs); Kurtis Patterson 86 (262); Lance Morris 5/26 (20.3 overs)
4/346d (120 overs); Hilton Cartwright 171* (294); Liam Hatcher 2/47 (20 overs)		4/130 (55 overs); Matthew Gilkes 53* (97); Joel Paris 2/8 (13 overs)

Match drawn
WACA Ground, Perth
Umpires: Gerard Abood and Donovan Koch
Player of the match: Hilton Cartwright (Western Australia)

- New South Wales won the toss and elected to field.
- Points: New South Wales 2.52, Western Australia 1.8

=== Round 10 ===
15–18 March 2025
Scorecard

(home team) South Australia	v	Queensland
7/614d (143.4 overs); Conor McInerney 142 (222); Marnus Labuschagne 2/73 (19 overs)		370 (113.5 overs); Jimmy Peirson 128 (281); Nathan McAndrew 3/68 (21 overs)
5/252 (76 overs); Jason Sangha 103 (194); Marnus Labuschagne 2/34 (18 overs)

Match drawn
Karen Rolton Oval, Adelaide
Umpires: Gerard Abood and Troy Penman
Player of the match: Conor McInerney (South Australia)

- South Australia won the toss and elected to bat.
- Conor McInerney (South Australia) scored his first century in first-class cricket.
- Points: South Australia 3.85, Queensland 2.96

15–18 March 2025
Scorecard

Victoria	v	Western Australia (home team)
197 (87.4 overs); Oliver Peake 52 (168); Corey Rocchiccioli 5/67 (29.4 overs)		186 (78.2 overs); Cooper Connolly 56 (104); David Moody 4/41 (16 overs)
9/370d (121 overs); Campbell Kellaway 165* (338); Corey Rocchiccioli 3/110 (36 overs)		347 (81.2 overs); Hilton Cartwright 79 (126); Peter Siddle 4/68 (17.2 overs)

Victoria won by 34 runs
WACA Ground, Perth
Umpires: Michael Graham-Smith and Ben Treloar
Player of the match: Campbell Kellaway (Victoria)

- Western Australia won the toss and elected to field.
- Oliver Peake (Victoria) made his first-class debut.
- Points: Victoria 7, Western Australia 1

15–18 March 2025 (D/N)
Scorecard

(home team) Tasmania	v	New South Wales
331 (96.3 overs); Jordan Silk 112 (208); Sean Abbott 6/99 (26 overs)		186 (62.4 overs); Ben Dwarshuis 40* (31); Beau Webster 5/44 (17.4 overs)
4/383d (100 overs); Jake Weatherald 145 (157); Tanveer Sangha 2/106 (30 overs)		202 (67.2 overs); Sam Konstas 68 (117); Matthew Kuhnemann 5/49 (20 overs)

Tasmania won by 326 runs
Bellerive Oval, Hobart
Umpires: Phillip Gillespie and Donovan Koch
Player of the match: Jordan Silk (Tasmania)

- Tasmania won the toss and elected to bat.
- Points: Tasmania 8.31, New South Wales 1

== Final ==
26–29 March 2025
Scorecard

Queensland	v	South Australia (home team)
95 (35.5 overs); Michael Neser 34 (37); Brendan Doggett 6/31 (11.5 overs)		271 (72.4 overs); Jake Lehmann 102 (151); Callum Vidler 4/64 (18 overs)
445 (136.2 overs); Jack Wildermuth 111 (140); Brendan Doggett 5/109 (35 overs)		6/270 (69.1 overs); Jason Sangha 126* (192); Mark Steketee 3/40 (14 overs)

South Australia won by 4 wickets
Karen Rolton Oval, Adelaide
Umpires: Donovan Koch and Sam Nogajski
Player of the match: Brendan Doggett (South Australia)

- South Australia won the toss and elected to field.
- Brendan Doggett (South Australia) took his first ten-wicket haul in first-class cricket.

== Statistics ==
=== Most runs ===
Player	Team	Mat	Inns	NO	Runs	Ave	HS	100	50
Jake Weatherald	Tasmania	10	18	0	906	50.33	187	3	3
Hilton Cartwright	Western Australia	10	18	3	861	57.40	171*	2	3
Jake Lehmann	South Australia	10	19	3	750	44.11	130*	4	2
Kurtis Patterson	New South Wales	8	14	1	743	57.15	167*	1	5
Alex Carey	South Australia	5	10	1	741	82.33	123*	4	2

=== Most wickets ===
Player	Team	Mat	Inns	Overs	Wkts	Ave	Econ	BBI	BBM	5	10
Nathan McAndrew	South Australia	8	14	269.5	40	20.20	2.99	7/11	8/43	2	0
Fergus O'Neill	Victoria	9	17	316.1	38	21.07	2.53	5/51	9/73	2	0
Corey Rocchiccioli	Western Australia	9	17	335.5	38	27.71	3.13	7/52	9/79	2	0
Jackson Bird	New South Wales	7	14	229.3	34	17.20	2.54	7/46	11/111	2	1
Brendan Doggett	South Australia	7	13	243.3	33	24.15	3.27	6/31	11/140	4	1

== See also ==
- 2024–25 Marsh One-Day Cup
