= 2024–25 Dean Jones Trophy =

Cricket tournament

- Dates: 22 September 2024 – 1 March 2025
- Administrator: Cricket Australia
- Cricket format: List A
- Tournament format: Round-robin tournament
- Host(s): Adelaide; Brisbane; Hobart; Launceston; Melbourne; Perth; Sydney
- Champions: South Australia (4th title)
- Participants: 6
- Matches: 22
- Player of the series: Liam Scott (SA)
- Most runs: Mackenzie Harvey (SA) (334)
- Most wickets: Peter Siddle (VIC) (17)
- Official website: 2024–25 One-Day Cup

The 2024–25 Dean Jones Trophy was the 56th season of the official List A domestic cricket competition played in Australia. The tournament ran from 22 September 2024 to 1 March 2025.

South Australia won the competition, the first time they had won both the One-Day Cup and the Sheffield Shield in the same season.

In December 2024, while the tournament was underway, Cricket Australia announced that the trophy given to the winners of the One-Day Cup would henceforth be known as the Dean Jones Trophy.

== Points table ==
Pos	Team	Pld	W	L	T	NR	BP	Pts	NRR
1	South Australia	7	4	2	0	1	3	21	0.250
2	Victoria	7	4	3	0	0	2	18	−0.162
3	New South Wales	7	3	3	0	1	2	16	0.099
4	Queensland	7	3	3	0	1	1	15	0.244
5	Tasmania	7	3	3	0	1	1	15	0.134
6	Western Australia	7	2	5	0	0	1	9	−0.481

Source: ESPNcricinfo
- Qualified to the final

Point system:

- Win – 4
- Tie – 2 each
- No Result – 2 each
- Loss – 0
- Bonus Point – 1 (run rate 1.25 times that of opposition)

== Fixtures ==
22 September 2024
09:30
Scorecard

(H) New South Wales; 9/287 (50 overs)	v	Western Australia; 279 (48.5 overs)
Josh Philippe 139 (119); Jhye Richardson 5/63 (10 overs)		Cameron Bancroft 71 (83); Jack Edwards 2/33 (10 overs)

New South Wales won by 8 runs
Cricket Central, Sydney
Umpires: Gerard Abood and Sam Nogajski
Player of the match: Josh Philippe (New South Wales)

- Western Australia won the toss and elected to field.
- Points: New South Wales 4, Western Australia 0

23 September 2024
10:00
Scorecard

Tasmania; 126 (30.1 overs)	v	Victoria (H); 6/128 (26.5 overs)
Jake Weatherald 31 (31); Sam Elliott 7/12 (8 overs)		Sam Harper 43 (32); Beau Webster 3/20 (7 overs)

Victoria won by 4 wickets
Junction Oval, Melbourne
Umpires: Phillip Gillespie and Shawn Craig
Player of the match: Sam Elliott (Victoria)

- Victoria won the toss and elected to field.
- Sam Elliott (Victoria) took his first five-wicket haul in List A cricket. His bowling figures of 7/12 are the best for Victoria in One Day Cup history.
- Points: Victoria 5, Tasmania 0

24 September 2024
09:30
Scorecard

South Australia; 166 (37.5 overs)	v	Western Australia; 164 (37.4 overs)
Daniel Drew 49 (68); Bryce Jackson 6/31 (9 overs)		Ashton Turner 53 (54); Nathan McAndrew 5/40 (10 overs)

South Australia won by 2 runs
Cricket Central, Sydney
Umpires: Donovan Koch and Sam Nogajski
Player of the match: Nathan McAndrew (South Australia)

- Western Australia won the toss and elected to field.
- Bryce Jackson (Western Australia) and Nathan McAndrew (South Australia) both took their first five-wicket haul in List A cricket.
- Points: South Australia 4, Western Australia 0

25 September 2024
10:00
Scorecard

Queensland; 5/128 (16 overs)	v	Tasmania
Matt Renshaw 51 (36); Gabe Bell 2/12 (3 overs)

No result
Junction Oval, Melbourne
Umpires: Phillip Gillespie and Michael Graham-Smith

- Tasmania won the toss and elected to field.
- The match was reduced to 16 overs per side due to rain.
- Tom Straker (Queensland) made his List A debut.
- No further play was possible due to rain.
- Points: Queensland 2, Tasmania 2

26 September 2024
09:30
Scorecard

(H) New South Wales	v	South Australia

Match abandoned
Cricket Central, Sydney
Umpires: Gerard Abood and Donovan Koch

- No toss
- No play was possible due to rain.
- Points: New South Wales 2, South Australia 2

27 September 2024
10:00
Scorecard

(H) Victoria; 7/240 (50 overs)	v	Queensland; 234 (49.5 overs)
Marcus Harris 63 (93); Mitchell Swepson 3/38 (10 overs)		Usman Khawaja 57 (72); Todd Murphy 3/38 (10 overs)

Victoria won by 6 runs
Junction Oval, Melbourne
Umpires: Shawn Craig and Andrew Crozier
Player of the match: Todd Murphy (Victoria)

- Queensland won the toss and elected to field.
- Points: Victoria 4, Queensland 0

13 October 2024
10:00
Scorecard

Queensland; 300 (49.3 overs)	v	Western Australia (H); 6/301 (49 overs)
Usman Khawaja 76 (80); Jhye Richardson 3/36 (9.3 overs)		Sam Whiteman 74 (67); Matt Renshaw 1/13 (2 overs)

Western Australia won by 4 wickets
WACA Ground, Perth
Umpires: Andrew Crozier and Sam Nogajski
Player of the match: Jhye Richardson (Western Australia)

- Western Australia won the toss and elected to field.
- Points: Western Australia 4, Queensland 0

25 October 2024
10:05
Scorecard

New South Wales; 8/336 (45 overs)	v	Victoria (H); 196 (34.2 overs)
Matthew Gilkes 74 (42); Peter Siddle 5/49 (9 overs)		Matthew Short 80 (58); Chris Green 3/27 (5.2 overs)

New South Wales won by 140 runs
Junction Oval, Melbourne
Umpires: Simon Lightbody and Troy Penman
Player of the match: Matthew Gilkes (New South Wales)

- Victoria won the toss and elected to field.
- The match was reduced to 45 overs per side due to rain.
- Charlie Anderson (New South Wales) made his List A debut.
- Points: New South Wales 5, Victoria 0

25 October 2024
10:00
Scorecard

South Australia; 218 (47 overs)	v	Queensland (H); 1/223 (32.3 overs)
Nathan McSweeney 137 (131); Liam Guthrie 4/15 (8 overs)		Jimmy Peirson 100* (98); Lloyd Pope 1/61 (6.3 overs)

Queensland won by 9 wickets
Allan Border Field, Brisbane
Umpires: Gerard Abood and Ben Treloar
Player of the match: Liam Guthrie (Queensland)

- South Australia won the toss and elected to bat.
- Nathan McSweeney (South Australia) and Jimmy Peirson (Queensland) scored their first century in List A cricket.
- Points: Queensland 5, South Australia 0

25 October 2024
10:00
Scorecard

(H) Western Australia; 53 (20.1 overs)	v	Tasmania; 3/55 (8.3 overs)
D'Arcy Short 22 (41); Beau Webster 6/17 (6 overs)		Mitchell Owen 29 (17); Joel Paris 2/10 (4 overs)

Tasmania won by 7 wickets
WACA Ground, Perth
Umpires: Donovan Koch and Michael Graham-Smith
Player of the match: Beau Webster (Tasmania)

- Tasmania won the toss and elected to field.
- Beau Webster (Tasmania) took his first five-wicket haul in List A cricket.
- Western Australia bowled out for second lowest total of 53 runs in the history of Australia One Day Cup.
- Points: Tasmania 5, Western Australia 0

6 November 2024
10:05
Scorecard

Victoria; 7/286 (50 overs)	v	South Australia (H); 1/289 (37.4 overs)
Peter Handscomb 104 (121); Spencer Johnson 4/46 (10 overs)		Mackenzie Harvey 134* (110); Xavier Crone 1/43 (6 overs)

South Australia won by 9 wickets
Karen Rolton Oval, Adelaide
Umpires: Ben Treloar and Troy Penman
Player of the match: Mackenzie Harvey (South Australia)

- South Australia won the toss and elected to field.
- Mackenzie Harvey (South Australia) scored his first century in List A cricket.
- Points: South Australia 5, Victoria 0

12 November 2024
10:05
Scorecard

New South Wales; 197 (45.2 overs)	v	South Australia (H); 4/198 (38.4 overs)
Matthew Gilkes 35 (41); Harry Conway 3/27 (9.2 overs)		Alex Carey 75 (63); Jack Nisbet 2/55 (8 overs)

South Australia won by 6 wickets
Adelaide Oval, Adelaide
Umpires: Greg Davidson and Simon Lightbody
Player of the match: Liam Scott (South Australia)

- South Australia won the toss and elected to field.
- Sam Konstas and Lachlan Shaw (New South Wales) both made their List A debuts.
- Points: South Australia 5, New South Wales 0

13 November 2024
10:05
Scorecard

(H) Victoria; 6/132 (23 overs)	v	Western Australia; 108 (22.4 overs)
Sam Harper 59* (54); Hilton Cartwright 2/23 (4 overs)		Ashton Turner 24 (24); Todd Murphy 4/27 (5 overs)

Victoria won by 15 runs (DLS method)
Melbourne Cricket Ground, Melbourne
Umpires: Eloise Sheridan and Ben Treloar
Player of the match: Todd Murphy (Victoria)

- Western Australia won the toss and elected to field.
- The match was reduced to 23 overs per side due to rain.
- Western Australia were set a revised target of 124 runs in 23 overs.
- Points: Victoria 4, Western Australia 0

3 December 2024
14:05 (D/N)
Scorecard

Queensland; 6/319 (46.3 overs)	v	Tasmania (H); 281 (44.2 overs)
Matt Renshaw 122 (99); Matthew Kuhnemann 3/49 (10 overs)		Matthew Wade 68 (53); Mitchell Swepson 4/40 (10 overs)

Queensland won by 56 runs (DLS method)
Bellerive Oval, Hobart
Umpires: Sharad Patel and Ben Treloar
Player of the match: Matt Renshaw (Queensland)

- Tasmania won the toss and elected to field.
- Rain interrupted Queensland's innings at 46.3 overs.
- Tasmania were set a revised target of 338 runs in 46 overs.
- Raf MacMillan (Tasmania) and Angus Lovell (Queensland) both made their List A debuts.
- Points: Queensland 4, Tasmania 0

5 February 2025
11:05
Scorecard

(H) Tasmania; 205 (47.1 overs)	v	New South Wales; 3/209 (38.3 overs)
Caleb Jewell 37 (42); Ben Dwarshuis 4/39 (8.1 overs)		Moises Henriques 71* (83); Gabe Bell 3/29 (10 overs)

New South Wales won by 7 wickets
University of Tasmania Stadium, Launceston
Umpires: Phillip Gillespie and Michael Graham-Smith
Player of the match: Moises Henriques (New South Wales)

- New South Wales won the toss and elected to field.
- Aidan O'Connor (Tasmania) made his List A debut.
- Points: New South Wales 5, Tasmania 0

13 February 2025
10:00
Scorecard

(H) Queensland; 9/310 (45 overs)	v	New South Wales; 256 (42.2 overs)
Lachlan Hearne 107 (91); Jack Nisbet 4/49 (9 overs)		Sam Konstas 116 (98); Liam Guthrie 3/45 (8.2 overs)

Queensland won by 54 runs
Allan Border Field, Brisbane
Umpires: Shawn Craig and Stephen Dionysius
Player of the match: Lachlan Hearne (Queensland)

- New South Wales won the toss and elected to field.
- The match was reduced to 45 overs per side due to rain.
- Callum Vidler (Queensland) made his List A debut.
- Lachlan Hearne (Queensland) and Sam Konstas (New South Wales) both scored their first centuries in List A cricket.
- Points: Queensland 4, New South Wales 0

13 February 2025
10:00
Scorecard

South Australia; 9/208 (50 overs)	v	Western Australia (H); 164 (38.5 overs)
Liam Scott 47 (68); Mahli Beardman 4/46 (10 overs)		D'Arcy Short 55 (68); Liam Scott 3/16 (8 overs)

South Australia won by 44 runs
WACA Ground, Perth
Umpires: Donovan Koch and Simon Lightbody
Player of the match: Liam Scott (South Australia)

- Western Australia won the toss and elected to field.
- Joel Curtis, Jayden Goodwin, Corey Rocchiccioli (Western Australia) and Harry Matthias (South Australia) all made their List A debuts.
- Points: South Australia 5, Western Australia 0

13 February 2025
14:00 (D/N)
Scorecard

Victoria; 9/266 (50 overs)	v	Tasmania (H); 270/5 (40.3 overs)
Tom Rogers 68 (70); Raf MacMillan 2/39 (9 overs)		Caleb Jewell 105* (115); Will Sutherland 2/45 (7 overs)

Tasmania won by 5 wickets
Bellerive Oval, Hobart
Umpires: Michael Graham-Smith and Sam Nogajski
Player of the match: Caleb Jewell (Tasmania)

- Victoria won the toss and elected to bat.
- Harry Dixon (Victoria) made his List A debut.
- Points: Tasmania 4, Victoria 0

23 February 2025
10:00
Scorecard

(H) New South Wales; 310 (49.5 overs)	v	Victoria; 2/311 (37.4 overs)
Lachlan Shaw 80 (67); Todd Murphy 3/46 (10 overs)		Campbell Kellaway 117* (101); Hayden Kerr 1/50 (7 overs)

Victoria won by 8 wickets
Cricket Central, Sydney
Umpires: Gerard Abood and Ben Treloar
Player of the match: Campbell Kellaway (Victoria)

- Victoria won the toss and elected to field.
- Campbell Kellaway (Victoria) scored his first century in List A cricket.
- Points: Victoria 5, New South Wales 0

23 February 2025
10:05
Scorecard

(H) Queensland; 131 (29.2 overs)	v	Western Australia; 4/132 (26 overs)
Mitchell Swepson 45 (35); Bryce Jackson 4/39 (10 overs)		Hilton Cartwright 33 (41); Callum Vidler 3/36 (6 overs)

Western Australia won by 6 wickets
The Gabba, Brisbane
Umpires: Donovan Koch and Claire Polosak
Player of the match: Bryce Jackson (Western Australia)

- Western Australia won the toss and elected to field.
- Points: Western Australia 5, Queensland 0

23 February 2025
11:00
Scorecard

(H) South Australia; 9/329 (50 overs)	v	Tasmania; 8/330 (49 overs)
Mackenzie Harvey 129 (118); Beau Webster 3/48 (9 overs)		Mitchell Owen 149 (69); Lloyd Pope 2/46 (10 overs)

Tasmania won by 2 wickets
Adelaide Oval, Adelaide
Umpires: Phillip Gillespie and Eloise Sheridan
Player of the match: Mitchell Owen (Tasmania)

- Tasmania won the toss and elected to field.
- Nivethan Radhakrishnan (Tasmania) made his List A debut.
- Points: Tasmania 4, South Australia 0

== Final ==
1 March 2025
14:05 (D/N)
Scorecard

(H) South Australia; 7/268 (50 overs)	v	Victoria; 204 (43.3 overs)
Harry Nielsen 68 (93); Peter Siddle 3/40 (10 overs)		Will Sutherland 50 (52); Henry Thornton 4/27 (9.3 overs)

South Australia won by 64 runs
Adelaide Oval, Adelaide
Umpires: Donovan Koch and Sam Nogajski
Player of the match: Henry Thornton (South Australia)

- Victoria won the toss and elected to field.

== Statistics ==
=== Most runs ===
Player	Team	Mat	Inns	NO	Runs	Ave	HS	100	50
Mackenzie Harvey	South Australia	7	7	1	334	55.66	134*	2	0
Matt Renshaw	Queensland	7	7	1	305	50.83	122	1	2
Matthew Gilkes	New South Wales	6	6	0	302	50.33	74	0	2
Lachlan Hearne	Queensland	7	6	0	277	46.16	107	1	1
Josh Philippe	New South Wales	6	6	0	270	45	139	1	0

=== Most wickets ===
Player	Team	Mat	Overs	Runs	Wkts	Ave	BBI	SR	4WI
Peter Siddle	Victoria	8	60.0	319	17	18.76	5/49	21.17	1
Beau Webster	Tasmania	5	34.0	153	16	9.56	6/17	12.75	1
Sam Elliott	Victoria	7	51.0	326	14	23.28	7/12	21.86	1
Bryce Jackson	Western Australia	4	39.0	187	12	15.58	6/31	19.50	2
Todd Murphy	Victoria	8	65.0	340	11	30.90	4/27	35.45	1

== Television coverage ==
Every match of the 2024–25 One-Day Cup was streamed live by Cricket Australia through their website and the CA Live app. Kayo Sports also streamed all 22 matches. Fox Cricket broadcast 8 matches, including the final.

== See also ==
- 2024–25 Sheffield Shield season
