= Australia A cricket team in India in 2025–26 =

International cricket tour

| | India A | Australia A |
- Dates: 16 September – 5 October 2025
| Captains | Shreyas Iyer (Note: Dhruv Jurel captained India A in the second unofficial Test.) | Nathan McSweeney (First-class); Jack Edwards (Note: Will Sutherland captained Australia A in the first unofficial ODI.) (List A) |

FC series
- Result: India A won the 2-match series 1–0
| Most runs | Sai Sudharsan (248) | Josh Philippe (212) |
| Most wickets | Gurnoor Brar (8); Manav Suthar (8) | Corey Rocchiccioli (6) |

LA series
- Result: India A won the 3-match series 2–1
| Most runs | Riyan Parag (187) | Cooper Connolly (147) |
| Most wickets | Nishant Sindhu (6) | Tanveer Sangha (7) |
- Player of the series: Riyan Parag (India A)

The Australia A cricket team toured India in September and October 2025 to play against India A cricket team. The tour consisted of two first-class and three List A matches. In May 2025, the Board of Control for Cricket in India (BCCI) confirmed the fixtures for the tour.

== Squads ==
| India A | | Australia A | |
| First-class | List A | First-class | List A |
|---|---|---|---|
| Shreyas Iyer (c); Dhruv Jurel (vc, wk); Khaleel Ahmed; Ayush Badoni; Gurnoor Brar; Harsh Dubey; Abhimanyu Easwaran; Narayan Jagadeesan (wk); Tanush Kotian; Prasidh Krishna; Nitish Kumar Reddy; Devdutt Padikkal; KL Rahul (Note: In squad for second unofficial Test only.); Sai Sudharsan; Manav Suthar; Mohammed Siraj; Yash Thakur | Shreyas Iyer (c); Tilak Varma (vc) (Note: In squad for second and third unofficial ODI only.); Rajat Patidar; Priyansh Arya (Note: In squad for first unofficial ODI only.); Ayush Badoni; Ravi Bishnoi; Vipraj Nigam; Riyan Parag; Abhishek Porel (wk); Harshit Rana; Abhishek Sharma; Suryansh Shedge; Nishant Sindhu; Arshdeep Singh; Gurjapneet Singh; Prabhsimran Singh (wk); Yudhvir Singh | Nathan McSweeney (c); Xavier Bartlett; Cooper Connolly; ~~Brody Couch~~; Jack Edwards; ~~Aaron Hardie~~; Campbell Kellaway; Sam Konstas; ~~Lance Morris~~; Todd Murphy; Fergus O'Neill; Oliver Peake; Josh Philippe (wk); Corey Rocchiccioli; Liam Scott; Will Sutherland; Henry Thornton | Jack Edwards (c); Cooper Connolly; Harry Dixon; Sam Elliott; Jake Fraser-McGurk; ~~Aaron Hardie~~; Mackenzie Harvey; Todd Murphy; Tanveer Sangha; Liam Scott; Lachlan Shaw (wk); Tom Straker; Will Sutherland; Henry Thornton; ~~Callum Vidler~~ |

On 24 August, Lance Morris was ruled out of the unofficial Test series due to back surgery. He was replaced by Brody Couch. Later, Couch was ruled out of the series due to a side strain and was replaced by Henry Thornton. On 8 September, Callum Vidler was ruled out of the unofficial ODI series due to a partial stress fracture and was replaced by Henry Thornton. On 11 September, Aaron Hardie was ruled out of the tour due to a shoulder injury, and Will Sutherland was added to second unofficial Test.

On 6 September, KL Rahul and Mohammed Siraj were added to the second unofficial Test. On 22 September, Shreyas Iyer was ruled out of the second unofficial Test due to his personal reasons.

== First-class series ==
=== 1st Unofficial Test ===
16–19 September 2025
Scorecard

| Australia A | v | India A |
| 532/6d (73 overs); Josh Philippe 123* (87); Harsh Dubey 3/141 (27 overs) | | 531/7d (141.4 overs); Devdutt Padikkal 150 (281); Corey Rocchiccioli 3/159 (36.1 overs) |
| 56/0 (16 overs); Sam Konstas 27* (49) |

Match drawn
Ekana Cricket Stadium, Lucknow
Umpires: Ulhas Gandhe (Ind) and Anish Sahasrabudhe (Ind)

- Australia A won the toss and elected to bat.
- Only 54.4 overs play was possible on day 4 due to rain.

=== 2nd Unofficial Test ===
23–26 September 2025
Scorecard

| Australia A | v | India A |
| 420 (97.2 overs); Jack Edwards 88 (78); Manav Suthar 5/107 (32 overs) | | 194 (52.5 overs); Sai Sudharsan 75 (140); Henry Thornton 4/36 (10 overs) |
| 185 (46.5 overs); Nathan McSweeney 85* (149); Gurnoor Brar 3/42 (9 overs) | | 413/5 (91.3 overs); KL Rahul 176* (210); Todd Murphy 3/114 (28 overs) |

India A won by 5 wickets
Ekana Cricket Stadium, Lucknow
Umpires: Keyur Kelkar (Ind) and Amit Rana (Ind)
Player of the match: KL Rahul (India A)

- India A won the toss and elected to field.

== List A series ==
=== 1st Unofficial ODI ===
30 September – 1 October 2025
13:30 (D/N)
Scorecard

| India A 413/6 (50 overs) | v | Australia A 242 (33.1 overs) |
| Shreyas Iyer 110 (83); Will Sutherland 2/73 (9 overs) | | Mackenzie Harvey 68 (62); Nishant Sindhu 4/50 (6.1 overs) |

India A won by 171 runs
Green Park Stadium, Kanpur
Umpires: Ajitesh Argal (Ind) and Tanmay Srivastava (Ind)
Player of the match: Shreyas Iyer (India A)

- Australia A won the toss and elected to field.
- No play was possible on 30 September due to rain.
- Gurjapneet Singh (India A) made his List A debut.
- Priyansh Arya (India A) scored his maiden century in List A cricket.

=== 2nd Unofficial ODI ===
3 October 2025
13:30 (D/N)
Scorecard

| India A 246 (45.5 overs) | v | Australia A 160/1 (16.4 overs) |
| Tilak Varma 94 (122); Jack Edwards 4/56 (8.5 overs) | | Mackenzie Harvey 70* (49); Nishant Sindhu 1/24 (2 overs) |

Australia A won by 9 wickets (DLS method)
Green Park Stadium, Kanpur
Umpires: Ajitesh Argal (Ind) and Tanmay Srivastava (Ind)
Player of the match: Mackenzie Harvey (Australia A)

- India A won the toss and elected to bat.
- The second innings was reduced to 25 overs due to rain and Australia A were set a revised target of 160 runs from 25 overs.

=== 3rd Unofficial ODI ===
5 October 2025
13:30 (D/N)
Scorecard

| Australia A 316 (49.1 overs) | v | India A 322/8 (46 overs) |
| Jack Edwards 89 (75); Arshdeep Singh 3/38 (10 overs) | | Prabhsimran Singh 102 (68); Todd Murphy 4/42 (10 overs) |

India A won by 2 wickets
Green Park Stadium, Kanpur
Umpires: Ajitesh Argal (Ind) and Tanmay Srivastava (Ind)
Player of the match: Prabhsimran Singh (India A)

- Australia A won the toss and elected to bat.
