= Keaton Critchell =

Australian cricketer

Personal information
- Full name: Keaton Grant Critchell
- Born: 11 January 1997 (age 29)
- Batting: Right-handed
- Bowling: Right-arm fast medium

Domestic team information
- Years: Team
- 2023/24–2025/26: Western Australia
- FC debut: 23 November 2024 Western Australia v South Australia
- LA debut: 14 February 2024 Western Australia v Tasmania

Career statistics
| Competition | FC | LA |
|---|---|---|
| Matches | 3 | 6 |
| Runs scored | 29 | 33 |
| Batting average | 7.25 | 11.00 |
| 100s/50s | 0/0 | 0/0 |
| Top score | 12 | 18 |
| Balls bowled | 192 | 138 |
| Wickets | 4 | 3 |
| Bowling average | 29.75 | 42.00 |
| 5 wickets in innings | 0 | 0 |
| 10 wickets in match | 0 | 0 |
| Best bowling | 3/33 | 1/24 |
| Catches/stumpings | 2/– | 3/– |
- Source: CricInfo, 20 May 2026

Keaton Critchell (born 11 January 1997) is an Australian former professional cricketer who played for Western Australia. He is a right-handed batsman and right-arm medium-fast bowler. He made his List A cricket debut on 14 February 2024 against Tasmania.

== Career ==
He made his List A debut for Western Australia on 14 February 2024 against Tasmania in the 2023–24 Marsh One-Day Cup. In April 2024, Critchell signed a professional contract with the Western Australia cricket team ahead of the 2024–25 season. He took his first List A wicket against Victoria on 13 November 2024 in the 2024–25 One-Day Cup. He made his first-class debut against South Australia in the 2024–25 Sheffield Shield season on 23 November 2024. He took three wickets on his first-class debut.

Critchell wasn't offered a new contract with Western Australia for the 2026-27 season.
