= 2019–20 Marsh One-Day Cup =

Cricket tournament

2019 Marsh One-Day Cup
- Dates: 21 September 2019 – 26 November 2019
- Administrator: Cricket Australia
- Cricket format: List A
- Tournament format: Round-robin tournament
- Host(s): Perth, Brisbane, Adelaide, Melbourne, Sydney, Gold Coast, Hobart
- Champions: Western Australia (14th title)
- Participants: 6
- Matches: 22
- Player of the series: Usman Khawaja & Marnus Labuschagne (QLD)
- Most runs: Daniel Hughes (NSW) (440 runs)
- Most wickets: Nathan Coulter-Nile (WA) (17 wickets)

The 2019 Marsh One-Day Cup was the 51st season of the official List A domestic cricket competition in Australia. The tournament saw matches played in Perth, Brisbane, Adelaide, Melbourne, Sydney, Gold Coast, and Hobart. Fox Cricket broadcast thirteen matches from the tournament. The tournament was sponsored by Marsh & McLennan Companies, after previously being sponsored by Jardine Lloyd Thompson.

Western Australia won the tournament, after they beat Queensland by four wickets in the final.

== Points table ==
Pos	Team	Pld	W	L	T	NR	BP	Ded	Pts	NRR
1	Queensland	7	5	2	0	0	2	0	22	0.757
2	Western Australia	7	5	2	0	0	2	0	22	0.482
3	South Australia	7	4	3	0	0	2	0	18	0.078
4	Tasmania	7	3	4	0	0	1	1	12	−0.034
5	Victoria	7	3	4	0	0	0	0	12	−0.784
6	New South Wales	7	1	6	0	0	1	0	5	−0.488

RESULT POINTS:

- Win – 4
- Tie – 2 each
- No Result – 2 each
- Loss – 0
- Bonus Point – 1 (Run rate 1.25 times that of opposition.)
- Additional Bonus Point – 1 (Run rate twice that of opposition.)

== Squads ==
The following squads were named:

New South Wales	Queensland	South Australia	Tasmania	Victoria	Western Australia
Peter Nevill (c); Sean Abbott; Nicholas Bertus; Jack Edwards; Mickey Edwards; Daniel Fallins; Matthew Gilkes; Liam Hatcher; Moises Henriques; Daniel Hughes; Nick Larkin; Nathan McAndrew; Arjun Nair; Kurtis Patterson; Daniel Sams	Usman Khawaja (c); Xavier Bartlett; Max Bryant; Joe Burns; Ben Cutting; Cameron Gannon; Sam Heazlett; Charlie Hemphrey; Matthew Kuhnemann; Marnus Labuschagne; Michael Neser; Jimmy Peirson; Matthew Renshaw; Billy Stanlake; Mark Steketee; Jack Wildermuth	Travis Head (c); Wes Agar; Alex Carey; Tom Cooper; Callum Ferguson; Jake Lehmann; Joe Mennie; Harry Nielsen; Lloyd Pope; Kane Richardson; Luke Robins; Alex Ross; Cameron Valente; Jake Weatherald; Adam Zampa	Matthew Wade (c); George Bailey; Jackson Bird; Alex Doolan; Jake Doran; Nathan Ellis; James Faulkner; Jarrod Freeman; Caleb Jewell; Ben McDermott; Riley Meredith; Alex Pyecroft; Gurinder Sandhu; Jordan Silk; Beau Webster	Peter Handscomb (c); Scott Boland; Jackson Coleman; Travis Dean; Andrew Fekete; Aaron Finch; Sam Harper; Marcus Harris; Mackenzie Harvey; Jon Holland; Nic Maddinson; Glenn Maxwell; James Pattinson; Will Pucovski; Matthew Short; Will Sutherland; Chris Tremain	Mitchell Marsh (c); Ashton Agar; Cameron Bancroft; Hilton Cartwright; Nathan Coulter-Nile; Cameron Green; Matt Kelly; Shaun Marsh; Josh Philippe; Jhye Richardson; D'Arcy Short; Marcus Stoinis; Ashton Turner; Andrew Tye

== Fixtures ==
21 September
14:00 (D/N)
Scorecard

Western Australia; 8/386 (50 overs)	v	Victoria; 261 (39.2 overs)
Marcus Stoinis 101* (58); Jon Holland 2/72 (10 overs)		Nic Maddinson 87 (80); Ashton Agar 3/54 (9 overs)

Western Australia won by 125 runs
WACA Ground, Perth
Umpires: Claire Polosak and Sam Nogajski
Player of the match: Marcus Stoinis (Western Australia)

- Western Australia won the toss and elected to bat.
- Will Sutherland (Victoria) conceded 102 runs from his ten overs, the most expensive bowling spell in one-day domestic cricket in Australia.

22 September
9:30
Scorecard

New South Wales; 5/305 (50 overs)	v	Queensland; 6/307 (48 overs)
Jack Edwards 84 (103); Billy Stanlake 2/49 (10 overs)		Sam Heazlett 70 (57); Harry Conway 3/72 (10 overs)

Queensland won by 4 wickets
Allan Border Field, Brisbane
Umpires: Michael Graham-Smith and Donovan Koch
Player of the match: Jack Wildermuth (Queensland)

- Queensland won the toss and elected to field.
- Nicholas Bertus and Nathan McAndrew (New South Wales) both made their List A debuts.

23 September
10:00
Scorecard

Victoria; 185 (47.5 overs)	v	Tasmania; 184 (40.4 overs)
Will Sutherland 53 (66); Nathan Ellis 3/35 (8.5 overs)		Ben McDermott 78 (108); Chris Tremain 4/36 (9.4 overs)

Victoria won by 1 run
WACA Ground, Perth
Umpires: Greg Davidson and Sam Nogajski
Player of the match: Will Sutherland (Victoria)

- Victoria won the toss and elected to bat.
- Nathan Ellis (Tasmania) made his List A debut.

24 September
9:30
Scorecard

South Australia; 226 (48.5 overs)	v	Queensland; 3/227 (35.5 overs)
Tom Cooper 62 (75); Billy Stanlake 3/38 (10 overs)		Joe Burns 65* (71); Cameron Valente 1/19 (3.5 overs)

Queensland won by 7 wickets
Allan Border Field, Brisbane
Umpires: Gerard Abood and Donovan Koch
Player of the match: Billy Stanlake (Queensland)

- Queensland won the toss and elected to field.

25 September
10:00
Scorecard

Western Australia; 312 (50 overs)	v	Tasmania; 210 (44.4 overs)
D'Arcy Short 129 (101); Riley Meredith 4/42 (10 overs)		George Bailey 70 (80); Jhye Richardson 3/23 (8 overs)

Western Australia won by 102 runs
WACA Ground, Perth
Umpires: Nathan Johnstone and Greg Davidson
Player of the match: D'Arcy Short (Western Australia)

- Tasmania won the toss and elected to field.

26 September
9:30
Scorecard

New South Wales; 173 (38.4 overs)	v	South Australia; 5/177 (39 overs)
Peter Nevill 40 (67); Kane Richardson 3/25 (8 overs)		Tom Cooper 52* (73); Arjun Nair 2/42 (9 overs)

South Australia won by 5 wickets
Allan Border Field, Brisbane
Umpires: Simon Lightbody and Donovan Koch
Player of the match: Kane Richardson (South Australia)

- South Australia won the toss and elected to field.
- Lloyd Pope (South Australia) made his List A debut.

29 September
10:00
Scorecard

Queensland; 9/322 (50 overs)	v	Victoria; 168 (39.5 overs)
Usman Khawaja 138 (126); James Pattinson 3/56 (10 overs)		Will Sutherland 66 (67); Mark Steketee 4/25 (10 overs)

Queensland won by 154 runs
Junction Oval, Melbourne
Umpires: John Ward and Geoff Joshua
Player of the match: Usman Khawaja (Queensland)

- Queensland won the toss and elected to bat.

29 September
10:00
Scorecard

South Australia; 9/228 (50 overs)	v	Tasmania; 5/229 (46.2 overs)
Alex Ross 82* (117); James Faulkner 3/28 (10 overs)		Ben McDermott 103* (140); Cameron Valente 1/42 (9.2 overs)

Tasmania won by 5 wickets
Karen Rolton Oval, Adelaide
Umpires: Darren Close and Simon Fry
Player of the match: Ben McDermott (Tasmania)

- South Australia won the toss and elected to bat.

30 September
9:30
Scorecard

Western Australia; 6/210 (35 overs)	v	New South Wales; 7/235 (35 overs)
Shaun Marsh 82 (84); Arjun Nair 2/18 (3 overs)		Daniel Hughes 112* (96); Nathan Coulter-Nile 3/47 (7 overs)

Western Australia won by 8 runs (DLS method)
Drummoyne Oval, Sydney
Umpires: Paul Wilson and Tony Wilds
Player of the match: Daniel Hughes (New South Wales)

- New South Wales won the toss and elected to field.
- Matthew Gilkes (New South Wales) made his List A debut.

1 October
10:00
Scorecard

Queensland; 6/304 (50 overs)	v	Victoria; 1/305 (44.2 overs)
Usman Khawaja 112 (125); Will Sutherland 2/43 (6 overs)		Aaron Finch 188* (151); Marnus Labuschagne 1/60 (8 overs)

Victoria won by 9 wickets
Junction Oval, Melbourne
Umpires: Sam Nogajski and Michael Graham-Smith
Player of the match: Aaron Finch (Victoria)

- Queensland won the toss and elected to bat.

1 October
10:00
Scorecard

Tasmania; 7/255 (50 overs)	v	South Australia; 2/257 (38.4 overs)
Caleb Jewell 104 (117); Cameron Valente 2/40 (10 overs)		Travis Head 80* (99); Riley Meredith 2/69 (8 overs)

South Australia won by 8 wickets
Karen Rolton Oval, Adelaide
Umpires: Ben Treloar and Simon Fry
Player of the match: Alex Carey (South Australia)

- Tasmania won the toss and elected to bat.
- Jarrod Freeman (Tasmania) made his List A debut.

2 October
9:30
Scorecard

New South Wales; 6/348 (50 overs)	v	Western Australia; 271 (44.3 overs)
Daniel Hughes 152 (143); Andrew Tye 3/86 (10 overs)		Hilton Cartwright 74 (68); Harry Conway 3/30 (8 overs)

New South Wales won by 77 runs
Drummoyne Oval, Sydney
Umpires: Paul Wilson and Tony Wilds
Player of the match: Daniel Hughes (New South Wales)

- Western Australia won the toss and elected to field.

23 October
10:00
Scorecard

New South Wales; 237 (43.1 overs)	v	Tasmania; 4/239 (45.1 overs)
Peter Nevill 56 (71); Nathan Ellis 5/38 (8.1 overs)		George Bailey 67 (73); Josh Hazlewood 3/47 (10 overs)

Tasmania won by 6 wickets
North Sydney Oval, Sydney
Umpires: Phillip Gillespie and Simon Lightbody
Player of the match: Nathan Ellis (Tasmania)

- Tasmania won the toss and elected to field.

23 October
10:00
Scorecard

Queensland; 9/295 (50 overs)	v	South Australia; 7/296 (49.4 overs)
Marnus Labuschagne 135 (127); Wes Agar 5/69 (10 overs)		Callum Ferguson 91 (113); Jack Wildermuth 3/53 (10 overs)

South Australia won by 3 wickets
The Gabba, Brisbane
Umpires: Greg Davidson and Shawn Craig
Player of the match: Adam Zampa (South Australia)

- South Australia won the toss and elected to field.

23 October
14:00 (D/N)
Scorecard

Western Australia; 9/281 (42 overs)	v	Victoria; 8/165 (20 overs)
Cameron Bancroft 76 (70); Matthew Short 2/32 (6 overs)		Peter Handscomb 73* (54); Matthew Kelly 3/7 (2 overs)

Western Australia won by 9 runs (DLS method)
WACA Ground, Perth
Umpires: Nathan Johnstone and Gerard Abood
Player of the match: Marcus Stoinis (Western Australia)

- Western Australia won the toss and elected to bat.
- Aaron Hardie (Western Australia) and Xavier Crone (Victoria) both made their List A debuts.

31 October
10:00
Scorecard

Queensland; 268 (50 overs)	v	Western Australia; 242 (48.1 overs)
Marnus Labuschagne 87 (89); Marcus Stoinis 4/50 (9 overs)		Shaun Marsh 85 (95); Michael Neser 3/37 (9.1 overs)

Queensland won by 26 runs
Metricon Stadium, Gold Coast
Umpires: Simon Fry and Michael Graham-Smith
Player of the match: Marnus Labuschagne (Queensland)

- Western Australia won the toss and elected to field.
- Bryce Street (Queensland) and Liam O'Connor (Western Australia) both made their List A debuts.

17 November
10:00
Scorecard

Western Australia; 252 (49.1 overs)	v	South Australia; 246 (49 overs)
Cameron Green 86 (78); Wes Agar 5/40 (10 overs)		Callum Ferguson 127 (125); Nathan Coulter-Nile 5/48 (10 overs)

Western Australia won by 6 runs
Karen Rolton Oval, Adelaide
Umpires: Darren Close and Shawn Craig
Player of the match: Nathan Coulter-Nile (Western Australia)

- South Australia won the toss and elected to field.

17 November
14:00 (D/N)
Scorecard

Victoria; 265 (49.2 overs)	v	New South Wales; 259 (49.5 overs)
Matthew Short 88 (85); Daniel Sams 5/46 (10 overs)		Moises Henriques 98 (111); Peter Siddle 3/40 (10 overs)

Victoria won by 6 runs
Melbourne Cricket Ground, Melbourne
Umpires: Phillip Gillespie and Geoff Joshua
Player of the match: Matthew Short (Victoria)

- Victoria won the toss and elected to bat.
- Jake Fraser-McGurk (Victoria) made his List A debut.

18 November
10:00
Scorecard

Tasmania; 223 (50 overs)	v	Queensland; 6/226 (47.1 overs)
Gurinder Sandhu 51 (48); Mark Steketee 3/33 (10 overs)		Usman Khawaja 86* (128); Jackson Bird 2/28 (10 overs)

Queensland won by 4 wickets
Blundstone Arena, Hobart
Umpires: Simon Fry and Michael Graham-Smith
Player of the match: Usman Khawaja (Queensland)

- Queensland won the toss and elected to field.

19 November
10:00
Scorecard

South Australia; 4/322 (50 overs)	v	Victoria; 5/321 (50 overs)
Callum Ferguson 122 (128); Xavier Crone 2/76 (10 overs)		Aaron Finch 119 (123); Daniel Worrall 2/56 (10 overs)

South Australia won by 1 run
Melbourne Cricket Ground, Melbourne
Umpires: John Ward and Geoff Joshua
Player of the match: Callum Ferguson (South Australia)

- South Australia won the toss and elected to bat.
- Mitchell Perry (Victoria) made his List A debut.

20 November
10:00
Scorecard

Tasmania; 9/251 (50 overs)	v	New South Wales; 131 (32.3 overs)
Mac Wright 104 (117); Liam Hatcher 3/46 (10 overs)		Jason Sangha 23 (26); Jackson Bird 6/25 (10 overs)

Tasmania won by 120 runs
Blundstone Arena, Hobart
Umpires: Tony Wilds and Michael Graham-Smith
Player of the match: Mac Wright (Tasmania)

- New South Wales won the toss and elected to field.
- Hayden Kerr (New South Wales) made his List A debut.
- Mac Wright (Tasmania) scored his maiden century in List A cricket.

== Final ==
26 November
10:00
Scorecard

Queensland; 205 (49.3 overs)	v	Western Australia; 6/210 (48.0 overs)
Jimmy Peirson 79 (83); Jhye Richardson 3/35 (10 overs)		Shaun Marsh 101* (132); Mark Steketee 2/32 (10 overs)

Western Australia won by 4 wickets
Allan Border Field, Brisbane
Umpires: Gerard Abood and Shawn Craig
Player of the match: Shaun Marsh (Western Australia)

- Western Australia won the toss and elected to field.

== Statistics ==
=== Most runs ===
Player	Team	Mat	Inns	NO	Runs	Avge	HS	100	50
Daniel Hughes	New South Wales	7	8	1	440	73.33	152	2	1
Aaron Finch	Victoria	6	6	1	409	81.80	188*	2	0
Callum Ferguson	South Australia	7	7	0	403	57.57	127	2	1
Usman Khawaja	Queensland	6	6	1	398	79.60	138	2	1
Shaun Marsh	Western Australia	8	8	1	389	55.57	101*	1	2

=== Most wickets ===
Player	Team	Mat	Overs	Runs	Wkts	Avge	BBI	SR	4WI
Nathan Coulter-Nile	Western Australia	7	60.3	322	17	18.94	5/48	21.3	1
Mark Steketee	Queensland	7	65.5	277	13	21.30	4/25	30.3	1
Nathan Ellis	Tasmania	7	52.0	271	12	22.58	5/38	26.0	1
Marcus Stoinis	Western Australia	8	52.0	290	12	24.16	4/50	26.0	1
Jackson Bird	Tasmania	6	59.0	226	11	20.54	6/25	32.1	1
