= 2020–21 Marsh One-Day Cup =

Cricket tournament

2021 Marsh One-Day Cup
- Dates: 15 February – 11 April 2021
- Administrator: Cricket Australia
- Cricket format: List A
- Tournament format: Round-robin tournament
- Host(s): Adelaide; Brisbane; Hobart; Melbourne; Perth; Sydney
- Champions: New South Wales (12th title)
- Participants: 6
- Matches: 16
- Player of the series: David Warner (NSW) & Tom Andrews (TAS)
- Most runs: Peter Handscomb (VIC) (299)
- Most wickets: Joel Paris (WA); Sean Abbott (NSW); Matthew Kuhnemann (QLD); Jackson Bird (TAS) (10 each)

The 2021 Marsh One-Day Cup was the 52nd season of the official List A domestic cricket competition being played in Australia.

Played during the first summer of the COVID-19 pandemic, the tournament's schedule was not confirmed until December 2020. with the final scheduled to be played on 30 April 2021, the latest finish to a domestic cricket season in Australia. On 10 February 2021, Cricket Australia reduced the tournament from 22 to 16 matches due to concerns over bubble fatigue, which resulted in a full schedule change.

New South Wales won the tournament, after they beat Western Australia by 102 runs in the final.

== Points table ==
Pos	Team	Pld	W	L	T	NR	BP	Ded	Pts	NRR
1	New South Wales	5	4	0	0	1	2	0	19	1.505
2	Western Australia	5	3	1	0	1	4	0	17	1.311
3	Queensland	5	3	1	0	1	2	0	15	1.020
4	Tasmania	5	2	3	0	0	2	0	10	0.023
5	Victoria	5	1	3	0	1	0	0	5	−1.226
6	South Australia	5	0	5	0	0	0	0	0	−2.256

Source: ESPNCricinfo.com
- Qualified to the finals

RESULT POINTS:

- Win – 4
- Tie – 2 each
- Match Abandoned (NR) – 1 each
- Loss – 0
- Bonus Point – 1 (Run rate 1.25 times that of opposition.)
- Additional Bonus Point – 1 (Run rate twice that of opposition.)

== Fixtures ==
15 February 2021
10:00
Scorecard

New South Wales; 9/318 (50 overs)	v	Victoria; 259 (46.1 overs)
Steve Smith 127 (124); Jon Holland 2/40 (10 overs)		Matthew Short 67 (67); Pat Cummins 2/28 (7 overs)

New South Wales won by 59 runs
North Sydney Oval, Sydney
Umpires: Rod Tucker and Troy Penman
Player of the match: Steve Smith (New South Wales)

- Victoria won the toss and elected to field.
- Oliver Davies (New South Wales) and Zak Evans (Victoria) both made their List A debuts.

22 February 2021
10:00
Scorecard

Tasmania; 237 (49.5 overs)	v	Queensland; 6/238 (47.4 overs)
Jordan Silk 77 (88); Billy Stanlake 4/24 (10 overs)		Usman Khawaja 93 (106); Nathan Ellis 3/39 (10 overs)

Queensland won by 4 wickets
Blundstone Arena, Hobart
Umpires: Bruce Oxenford and Darren Close
Player of the match: Billy Stanlake (Queensland)

- Queensland won the toss and elected to field.
- Mitchell Owen (Tasmania) made his List A debut.

2 March 2021
10:00
Scorecard

Western Australia; 5/369 (50 overs)	v	South Australia; 356 (49.2 overs)
Cameron Green 144 (101); Daniel Worrall 2/62 (10 overs)		Travis Head 142 (86); Liam Guthrie 2/55 (10 overs)

Western Australia won by 13 runs
WACA Ground, Perth
Umpires: Donovan Koch and Nathan Johnstone
Player of the match: Cameron Green (Western Australia)

- South Australia won the toss and elected to field.
- Liam Guthrie, Nick Hobson (Western Australia), Corey Kelly and Peter Hatzoglou (South Australia) all made their List A debuts.

4 March 2021
14:00 (D/N)
Scorecard

South Australia; 205 (46.3 overs)	v	New South Wales; 4/208 (29.1 overs)
Alex Carey 99 (114); Sean Abbott 3/30 (8.3 overs)		David Warner 87 (74); Wes Agar 2/54 (8.1 overs)

New South Wales won by 6 wickets
Adelaide Oval, Adelaide
Umpires: Ben Treloar and Michael Graham-Smith
Player of the match: David Warner (New South Wales)

- South Australia won the toss and elected to bat.

10 March 2021
10:00
Scorecard

Victoria; 222 (46.2 overs)	v	Tasmania; 4/225 (44.2 overs)
Peter Handscomb 95 (106); Tom Andrews 3/45 (10 overs)		Jordan Silk 69* (74); Brody Couch 1/19 (7 overs)

Tasmania won by 6 wickets
Junction Oval, Melbourne
Umpires: Shawn Craig and Simon Lightbody
Player of the match: Tom Andrews (Tasmania)

- Tasmania won the toss and elected to field.
- Brody Couch, Todd Murphy and Wil Parker (Victoria) all made their List A debuts.

11 March 2021
10:00
Scorecard

Queensland; 9/264 (50 overs)	v	Western Australia; 143 (31.5 overs)
Jack Wildermuth 66 (66); Joel Paris 4/50 (10 overs)		Sam Whiteman 52 (63); Michael Neser 3/10 (6 overs)

Queensland won by 93 runs (DLS method)
The Gabba, Brisbane
Umpires: David Taylor and Gerard Abood
Player of the match: Jack Wildermuth (Queensland)

- Western Australia won the toss and elected to field.

12 March 2021
10:00
Scorecard

South Australia; 104 (32 overs)	v	Tasmania; 1/108 (17.3 overs)
Callum Ferguson 26 (54); Tom Andrews 3/29 (9 overs)		Tim Paine 54 (68); Cameron Valente 1/16 (4.3 overs)

Tasmania won by 9 wickets
Junction Oval, Melbourne
Umpires: Shawn Craig and Darren Close
Player of the match: Riley Meredith (Tasmania)

- South Australia won the toss and elected to bat.

14 March 2021
10:00
Scorecard

New South Wales	v	Western Australia

Match abandoned
North Sydney Oval, Sydney
Umpires: Claire Polosak and Tony Wilds

- No toss.
- No play was possible due to rain.

18 March 2021
10:00
Scorecard

Tasmania; 9/258 (50 overs)	v	New South Wales; 7/259 (48.5 overs)
Caleb Jewell 70 (51); Ben Dwarshuis 4/50 (10 overs)		David Warner 108 (115); Jackson Bird 3/52 (10 overs)

New South Wales won by 3 wickets
Blundstone Arena, Hobart
Umpires: Darren Close and Sam Nogajski
Player of the match: David Warner (New South Wales)

- New South Wales won the toss and elected to field.

20 March 2021
10:00
Scorecard

Queensland	v	Victoria

Match abandoned
Allan Border Field, Brisbane
Umpires: Greg Davidson and Donovan Koch

- No toss.
- No play was possible due to a wet outfield.

23 March 2021
10:00
Scorecard

Western Australia; 317 (48.3 overs)	v	Victoria; 147 (30.1 overs)
Josh Inglis 91 (57); Jonathan Merlo 5/71 (9.3 overs)		Sam Harper 60 (64); Joel Paris 4/21 (7.1 overs)

Western Australia won by 170 runs
WACA Ground, Perth
Umpires: Bruce Oxenford and Paul Wilson
Player of the match: Josh Inglis (Western Australia)

- Western Australian won the toss and elected to bat.

28 March 2021
10:00
Scorecard

Queensland; 6/321 (50 overs)	v	South Australia; 161 (34.5 overs)
Marnus Labuschagne 82 (80); Spencer Johnson 1/38 (6 overs)		Jake Weatherald 68 (78); Matthew Kuhnemann 4/37 (7.5 overs)

Queensland won by 160 runs
Allan Border Field, Brisbane
Umpires: Donovan Koch and Paul Reiffel
Player of the match: Matthew Kuhnemann (Queensland)

- South Australia won the toss and elected to field.
- Samuel Kerber (South Australia) made his List A debut.

31 March 2021
14:00 (D/N)
Scorecard

Queensland; 203 (46.5 overs)	v	New South Wales (H); 2/204 (33.2 overs)
Jimmy Peirson 59 (77); Pat Cummins 3/34 (8 overs)		Daniel Hughes 101 (100); Xavier Bartlett 1/20 (4 overs)

New South Wales won by 8 wickets
North Sydney Oval, Sydney
Umpires: Greg Davidson and Gerard Abood
Player of the match: Daniel Hughes (New South Wales)

- Queensland won the toss and elected to bat.

8 April 2021
9:45
Scorecard

Victoria; 7/333 (50 overs)	v	South Australia; 312 (49.3 overs)
Peter Handscomb 131 (105); Wes Agar 3/46 (10 overs)		Travis Head 77 (55); Matthew Short 3/44 (7 overs)

Victoria won by 21 runs
Junction Oval, Melbourne
Umpires: Phillip Gillespie and Sam Nogajski
Player of the match: Jonathan Merlo (Victoria)

- South Australia won the toss and elected to field.
- James Seymour and Sam Elliott (Victoria) both made their List A debuts.

8 April 2021
9:30
Scorecard

Western Australia; 307 (48.3 overs)	v	Tasmania; 148 (24.5 overs)
Mitchell Marsh 63 (48); Sam Rainbird 3/58 (10 overs)		Beau Webster 51* (37); Jason Behrendorff 3/33 (6 overs)

Western Australia won by 159 runs
WACA Ground, Perth
Umpires: Michael Graham-Smith and Nathan Johnstone
Player of the match: Jason Behrendorff (Western Australia)

- Tasmania won the toss and elected to field.
- Lance Morris (Western Australia) made his List A debut.

== Final ==
11 April 2021
9:30
Scorecard

New South Wales; 8/251 (50 overs)	v	Western Australia; 149 (40.3 overs)
Jack Edwards 108 (122); Jason Behrendorff 3/46 (10 overs)		Cameron Green 36 (55); Sean Abbott 4/23 (7 overs)

New South Wales won by 102 runs
Bankstown Oval, Sydney
Umpires: Gerard Abood and Shawn Craig
Player of the match: Jack Edwards (New South Wales)

- New South Wales won the toss and elected to bat.

== Statistics ==
=== Most runs ===
Player	Team	Mat	Inns	NO	Runs	Ave	HS	100	50
Peter Handscomb	Victoria	4	4	0	299	74.75	131	1	1
Travis Head	South Australia	5	5	0	276	55.2	142	1	1
Sam Whiteman	Western Australia	5	5	0	220	44	66	0	3
Steve Smith	New South Wales	2	2	1	213	213	127	1	1
Cameron Green	Western Australia	5	5	0	210	42	144	1	0

=== Most wickets ===
Player	Team	Mat	Overs	Runs	Wkts	Ave	BBI	SR	4WI
Joel Paris	Western Australia	3	27.1	133	10	13.3	4/21	16.3	2
Sean Abbott	New South Wales	4	33.3	152	10	15.2	4/23	20.1	1
Matthew Kuhnemann	Queensland	4	29.4	157	10	15.7	4/37	17.8	1
Jackson Bird	Tasmania	5	45.3	242	10	24.2	3/52	27.3	0
Jonathan Merlo	Victoria	2	17.0	116	8	24.2	5/71	12.75	1

== Television coverage ==
Every match of the 2021 Marsh Cup was streamed live by Cricket Australia through their website and the CA Live app. Kayo Sports also streamed all 16 matches from the tournament. Fox Cricket broadcast 12 matches, including the final.
