= Tom Whitney (cricketer) =

Australian cricketer

Personal information
- Born: 7 November 2002 (age 24); Brisbane, Queensland, Australia
- Batting: Right-handed
- Bowling: Right-arm fast-medium
- Role: Bowler

Domestic team information
- Years: Team
- 2022/23–present: Queensland (squad no. 31)
- 2024: Brisbane Heat

Career statistics
| Competition | FC | LA | T20 |
|---|---|---|---|
| Matches | 3 | 6 | 2 |
| Runs scored | 28 | 13 | - |
| Batting average | 14.00 | 6.50 | - |
| 100s/50s | 0/0 | 0/0 | -/- |
| Top score | 24* | 9* | - |
| Balls bowled | 402 | 312 | 36 |
| Wickets | 11 | 10 | 2 |
| Bowling average | 26.45 | 36.90 | 27.50 |
| 5 wickets in innings | 1 | 0 | 0 |
| 10 wickets in match | 0 | 0 | 0 |
| Best bowling | 5/57 | 2/41 | 1/27 |
| Catches/stumpings | 0/– | 0/– | 0/– |
- Source: ESPNcricinfo, 18 October 2026

Tom Whitney (born 7 November 2002) is an Australian cricketer who plays for Queensland. He plays as a right-arm fast-medium bowler and right-handed batter.

== Career ==
In December 2021, Whitney was named as part of Australia's 15-player squad for the 2022 Under-19 Men's Cricket World Cup. On 26 February 2023, he made his List A debut for Queensland against New South Wales in the 2022–23 Marsh One-Day Cup. In May 2023, he was awarded a rookie contract for Queensland.

On October 20 2024, Whitney made his first-class debut against South Australia during the 2024–25 Sheffield Shield season. He became the 12th Queensland player to take a five-wicket haul on debut, with figures of 5/57 in the first innings. He was upgraded to a full time contract in May 2025.
