= Ross Pawson =

Australian cricketer

Personal information
- Full name: Ross Robert Pawson
- Born: 15 November 1994 (age 31); Albury, New South Wales, Australia
- Batting: Right-handed
- Bowling: Right-arm fast medium
- Role: Bowler

Domestic team information
- Years: Team
- 2022/23: Sydney Thunder
- 2024/25: New South Wales (squad no. 25)

Career statistics
Competition	FC	T20
Matches	1	1
Runs scored	13	–
Batting average	6.50	–
100s/50s	0/0	–
Top score	9	–
Balls bowled	180	12
Wickets	2	0
Bowling average	58.00	–
5 wickets in innings	0	–
10 wickets in match	0	–
Best bowling	1/52	–
Catches/stumpings	0/–	0/–
- Source: Cricinfo, 24 September 2025

Ross Robert Pawson (born 15 November 1994) is an Australian cricketer who plays for New South Wales cricket team and Sydney Thunder. He is a right-handed batsman and right-arm medium-fast bowler.

== Career ==
Pawson was called up by Sydney Thunder for the 2022–23 Big Bash League season. He made his Twenty20 debut in Eliminator of that tournament against Brisbane Heat on 27 January 2023. In May 2023, Pawson was signed a professional contract with New South Wales ahead of the 2023–24 season. He made his first-class debut on 8 February 2025 in the 2024–25 Sheffield Shield season.

Pawson is currently under investigation by the NSW police sex crimes squad and has been indefinitely suspended by Cricket NSW. The allegations pertain to sending unsolicited pictures of a sexual nature. No charges have yet been laid.
