= Brendan Doggett =

Australian cricketer (born 1994)

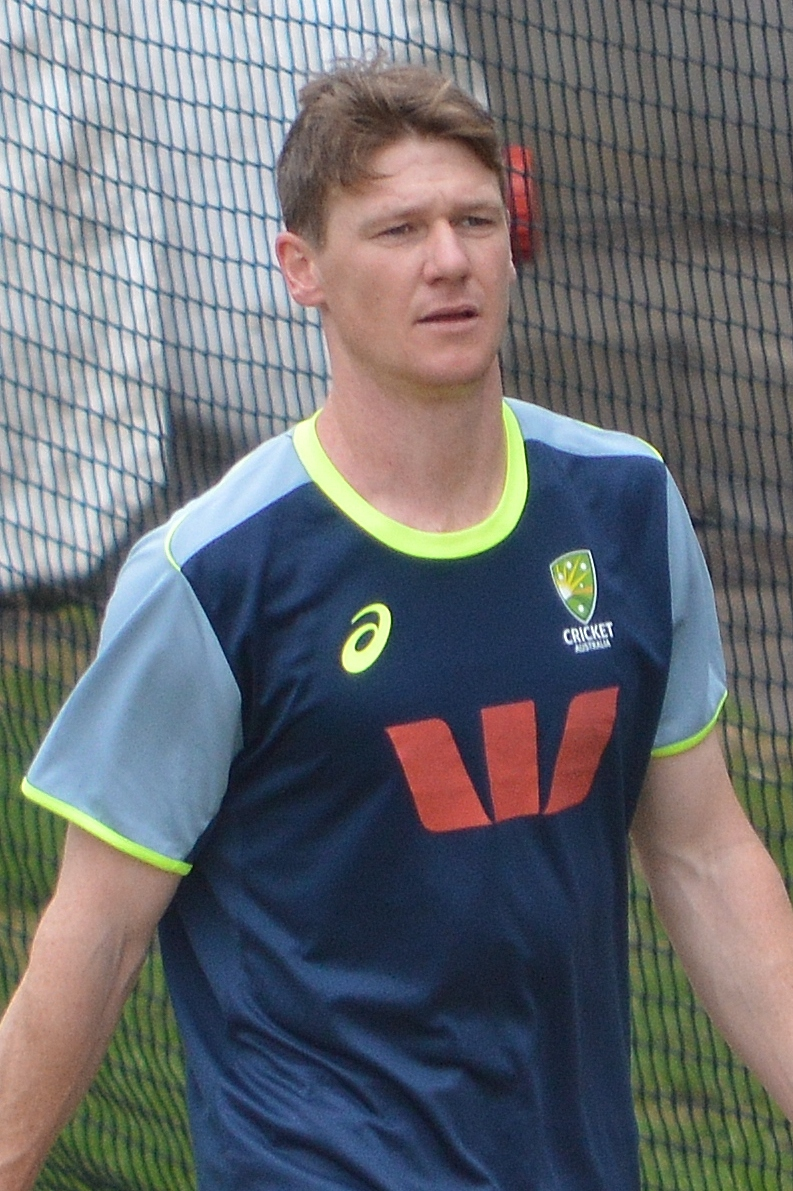
- Doggett in December 2025

Personal information
- Full name: Brendan James Doggett
- Born: 3 May 1994 (age 32); Rockhampton, Queensland, Australia
- Batting: Right-handed
- Bowling: Right-arm fast-medium
- Role: Bowler

International information
- National side: Australia (2025–present)
- Test debut (cap 472): 21 November 2025 v England
- Last Test: 4 December 2025 v England

Domestic team information
- Years: Team
- 2016/17: Cricket Australia XI
- 2017/18–2020/21: Queensland
- 2017/18–2018/19: Brisbane Heat
- 2019/20–2022/23: Sydney Thunder
- 2021/22–present: South Australia
- 2023/24–2024/25: Adelaide Strikers
- 2025: Durham

Career statistics
Competition	Test	FC	LA	T20
Matches	2	56	17	51
Runs scored	20	454	55	100
Batting average	20.00	9.08	11.00	11.11
100s/50s	0/0	0/0	0/0	0/0
Top score	13	49	28	47*
Balls bowled	290	10,413	835	944
Wickets	7	214	26	44
Bowling average	30.71	26.34	35.80	30.59
5 wickets in innings	0	9	0	1
10 wickets in match	0	1	0	0
Best bowling	3/51	6/15	4/75	5/35
Catches/stumpings	1/–	20/–	6/–	16/–
- Source: ESPNcricinfo, 23 October 2026

Brendan James Doggett (born 3 May 1994) is an Australian international cricketer. He plays in the test side of the Australia national team as a right-arm fast-medium bowler. Doggett is of Worimi heritage and is the fifth First Nations person to represent Australia in test cricket. He represents South Australia in domestic cricket and Adelaide Strikers in the Big Bash League.

== Domestic career ==
=== Queensland ===
At the beginning of the 2016–17 season, Doggett earned a rookie contract with the Queensland Bulls, becoming just the second Indigenous Australian to have a contract with the team, but he did not play for them throughout the season, instead making his List A for Cricket Australia XI in the 2016–17 Matador BBQs One-Day Cup. He played in the first match against Queensland, and late in the innings he bowled fellow Queenslander Ben Cutting to take his first List A wicket. He took six wickets across four matches in the tournament, the second-most of any player for Cricket Australia XI.

No longer in the Cricket Australia XI squad, Doggett played his first matches for Queensland in the 2017–18 JLT One-Day Cup and took five wickets for the team while conceding 6.19 runs per over in four matches. He then made his first-class debut in the opening round of the 2017–18 Sheffield Shield season. In his first innings of first-class bowling he had impressive figures of 4/33 while Victoria were bowled out for 148. In February 2018, in round eight of the 2017–18 Sheffield Shield season, he took his maiden five-wicket haul in first-class cricket.

=== South Australia ===
In 2021 Doggett moved to Adelaide and began playing for South Australia.

Doggett won the player of the match award in the 2024-25 Sheffield Shield Final, having taken 11 wickets in the match, including 6/31 in the first innings and 5/109 in the second. His efforts led South Australia to their first Sheffield Shield title in 29 years. His match figures of 11/140 were the best ever figures in a Sheffield Shield final.

=== County Cricket ===
In February, Doggett signed a short-term contract with Durham County Cricket Club to play for them in the first two months of the 2025 County Championship season.

== International career ==
In September 2018, he was named in Australia's Test squad for their series against Pakistan, but he did not play. He was selected for Australia A as an injury replacement for the India A tour of Australia in 2024–25. In the first unofficial Test, he took his third five-wicket haul with figures of 6/15. In November 2024, he was added to the Australian Test squad ahead of the second Test of the Indian tour of Australia as an injury replacement for Josh Hazlewood, but did not play.

Doggett made his Test debut in the first Test of the 2025–26 Ashes series, in Perth, on 21 November 2025. He became the fifth Indigenous player to play for the Australian men's Test team. With he and Scott Boland playing, it was also the first time two Indigenous players had played in an Australian men's Test team together. Doggett took 7 wickets across 2 matches (Perth and Brisbane) in the series at an average of 30.71.
