= Henry Thornton (cricketer) =

Australian cricketer (born 1996)

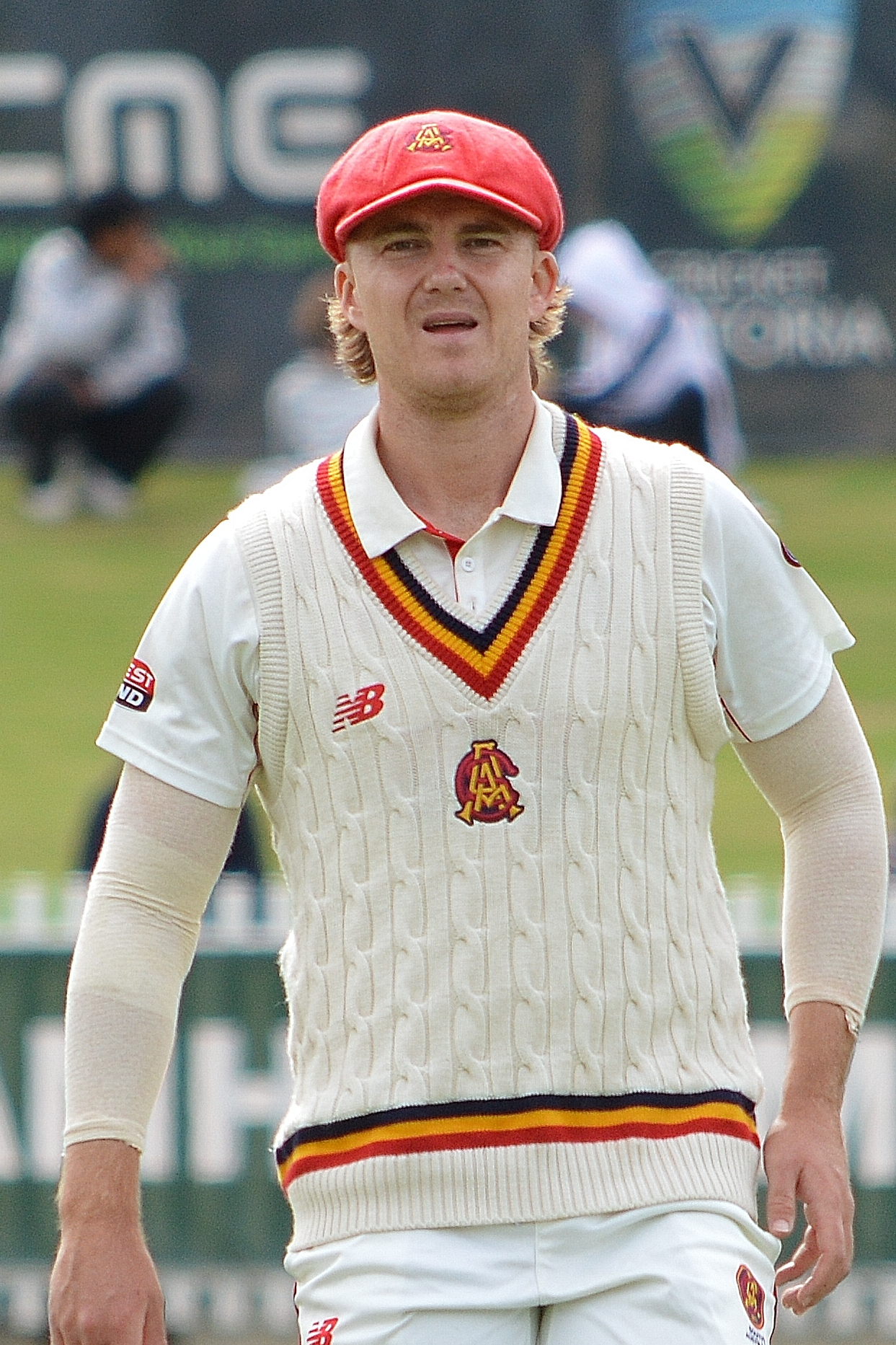
- Thornton playing First Class cricket with South Australia in March 2026

Personal information
- Full name: Henry Thomas Raphael James York Thornton
- Born: 16 December 1996 (age 29); Kogarah, New South Wales, Australia
- Batting: Right-handed
- Bowling: Right-arm fast
- Role: Bowler

Domestic team information
- Years: Team
- 2016/17: Sydney Sixers (squad no. 6)
- 2017/18: Cricket Australia XI (squad no. 9)
- 2017/18: New South Wales
- 2021/22–present: Adelaide Strikers (squad no. 58)
- 2021/22: Victoria
- 2022/23–present: South Australia (squad no. 58)

Career statistics
Competition	FC	LA	T20
Matches	15	39	36
Runs scored	188	256	56
Batting average	13.42	15.05	14.00
100s/50s	0/0	0/1	0/0
Top score	32*	51	28*
Balls bowled	2,400	1,973	725
Wickets	55	64	51
Bowling average	22.45	30.03	20.66
5 wickets in innings	1	1	1
10 wickets in match	0	0	0
Best bowling	5/71	7/39	5/3
Catches/stumpings	4/–	9/–	7/–
- Source: Cricinfo, 23 October 2026

Henry Thornton (born 16 December 1996) is an Australian cricketer who plays for the South Australian cricket team and the Adelaide Strikers. He made his List A debut for Cricket Australia XI against Pakistanis during their tour of Australia on 10 January 2017.

== Domestic career ==
Thornton made his Twenty20 debut playing for the Sydney Sixers in the 2016–17 Big Bash League against the Brisbane Heat on 3 January 2017. He opened the bowling and bowled his full four overs with figures of 1/40. Though it was the only BBL match he played for the season, he made his List A debut a week later playing for Cricket Australia XI in a tour match against Pakistan. He bowled 10 overs, including a maiden, and had figures of 3/69. Later in the season Thornton played a Twenty20 tour match against Sri Lanka, this time playing for the invitational team Prime Minister's XI. He bowled 2.1 overs with figures of 0/24.

Thornton was included in the Cricket Australia XI squad for the 2017–18 JLT One-Day Cup. He played three matches during the tournament, bowling at an economy rate of 5.64, but he was only able to take two wickets.

Four years after his Big Bash debut, Thornton played his second match in the competition, appearing for Adelaide Strikers in a 2021–22 match against Brisbane Heat. He took one wicket for the cost of 12 runs in three overs, generating some "eye-catching late movement" during the match.

On 16 December 2022 (his 26th birthday), Thornton took 5/3 to help bowl the Sydney Thunder out for 15, the lowest score in a professional T20 match.

On 1 November 2024, Thornton made his first-class debut for South Australia during the 2024–25 Sheffield Shield season.

Thornton won the inaugural Michael Bevan Medal as player of the match in the 2024–25 One-Day Cup final, having taken figures of 4–27 from 9.3 overs, as South Australia won their first One-Day Cup in 13 years.
