= Nathan McAndrew =

Australian cricketer

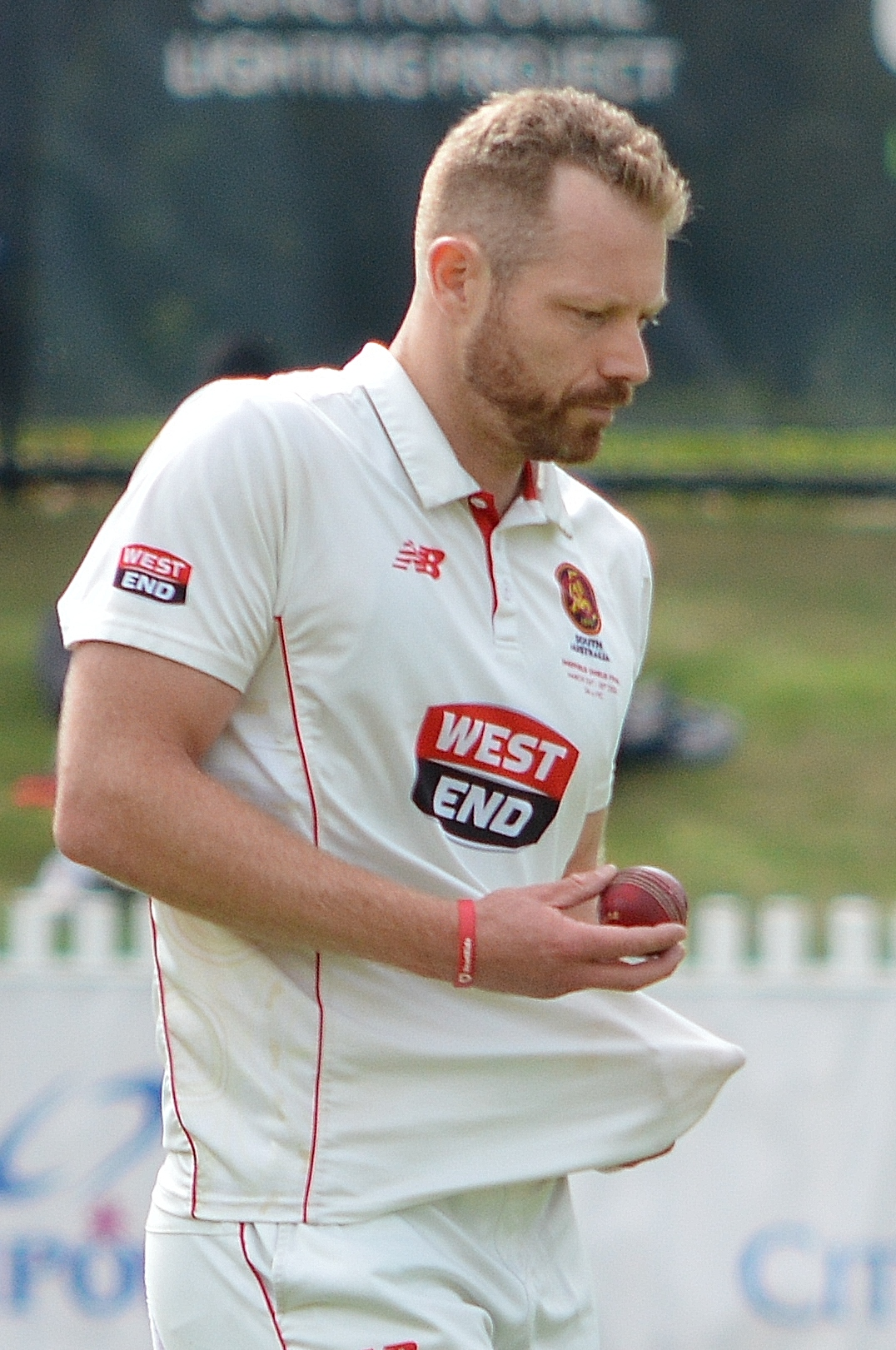
- McAndrew playing First Class cricket for South Australia in March 2026

Personal information
- Full name: Nathan John McAndrew
- Born: 14 July 1993 (age 33); Wollongong, New South Wales, Australia
- Height: 1.91 m (6 ft 3 in)
- Batting: Right-handed
- Bowling: Right-arm medium-fast
- Role: Bowler

Domestic team information
- Years: Team
- 2015/16–present: Sydney Thunder (squad no. 44)
- 2015/16: Auckland
- 2019/20–2020/21: New South Wales (squad no. 44)
- 2021/22–present: South Australia (squad no. 0)
- 2022: Warwickshire (squad no. 0)
- 2023–2025: Sussex (squad no. 43)
- 2026: Glamorgan (squad no. 0)

Career statistics
Competition	FC	LA	T20
Matches	69	27	119
Runs scored	2,089	313	702
Batting average	24.01	14.90	15.95
100s/50s	0/10	0/1	0/0
Top score	92	55	36
Balls bowled	13,233	1,331	2,258
Wickets	274	38	127
Bowling average	25.06	34.07	27.41
5 wickets in innings	14	2	3
10 wickets in match	1	0	0
Best bowling	7/11	5/23	6/21
Catches/stumpings	25/–	10/–	39/–
- Source: Cricinfo, 23 October 2026

Nathan John McAndrew (born 14 July 1993) is an Australian cricketer. A medium-fast bowler, McAndrew was called into the Sydney Thunder squad for BBL|05, where the Sydney Thunder would ultimately win the championship. He made his Twenty20 debut on 16 January 2016 against the Sydney Sixers.

After linking up with the club through NSW bowling coach Andre Adams, McAndrew made his first-class debut for Auckland on 5 February 2016 in the 2015–16 Plunket Shield, where he played three matches.

McAndrew was first called up to the New South Wales squad in 2019, where he made his List A debut on 22 September 2019, in the 2019–20 Marsh One-Day Cup.

In June 2020, McAndrew was included in the New South Wales contracts list ahead of the 2020/21 season, where he appeared in the 2020–21 Marsh One-Day Cup.

In May 2021, McAndrew signed with South Australia for the 2021/22 season. McAndrew made his Sheffield Shield debut in the opening game of the 2021-22 Sheffield Shield season against Western Australia, taking 3/71 in the first innings, including Test players Cameron Bancroft, Cameron Green and Shaun Marsh, and scoring 65*. McAndrew cites his reasons for moving to South Australia as being due to his ambition to play Sheffield Shield in addition to white-ball cricket.

He signed for Sussex County Cricket Club for the 2023 season. McAndrew went on to rejoin the club for both the 2024 and 2025 seasons.

== Personal life ==
As of 2021, McAndrew had almost completed his studies in civil engineering at the University of Wollongong. He was able to study part-time to allow time for his cricket career.
