= Craig Howard (cricketer) =

Australian cricketer (born 1974)

Personal information
- Born: 8 April 1974 (age 52); Melbourne, Australia

Domestic team information
- Years: Team
- 1993-1996: Victoria
- Source: Cricinfo, 10 December 2015

Craig Howard (born 8 April 1974) is an Australian former cricketer. He played 16 first-class cricket matches for Victoria between 1993 and 1996. A leg spin bowler, Howard played for Victoria around the time of Shane Warne's emergence and struggled in comparison.

Since retiring from playing, Howard has become a spin bowling coach. He has worked as a consultant with Cricket Australia, South Australia, Adelaide Strikers and the New Zealand women's team. In February 2024, he was appointed National Spin Bowling Coach of the Sri Lanka's men team on a two-year contract.

== See also ==
- List of Victoria first-class cricketers
