= Sam Konstas =

Australian cricketer (born 2005)

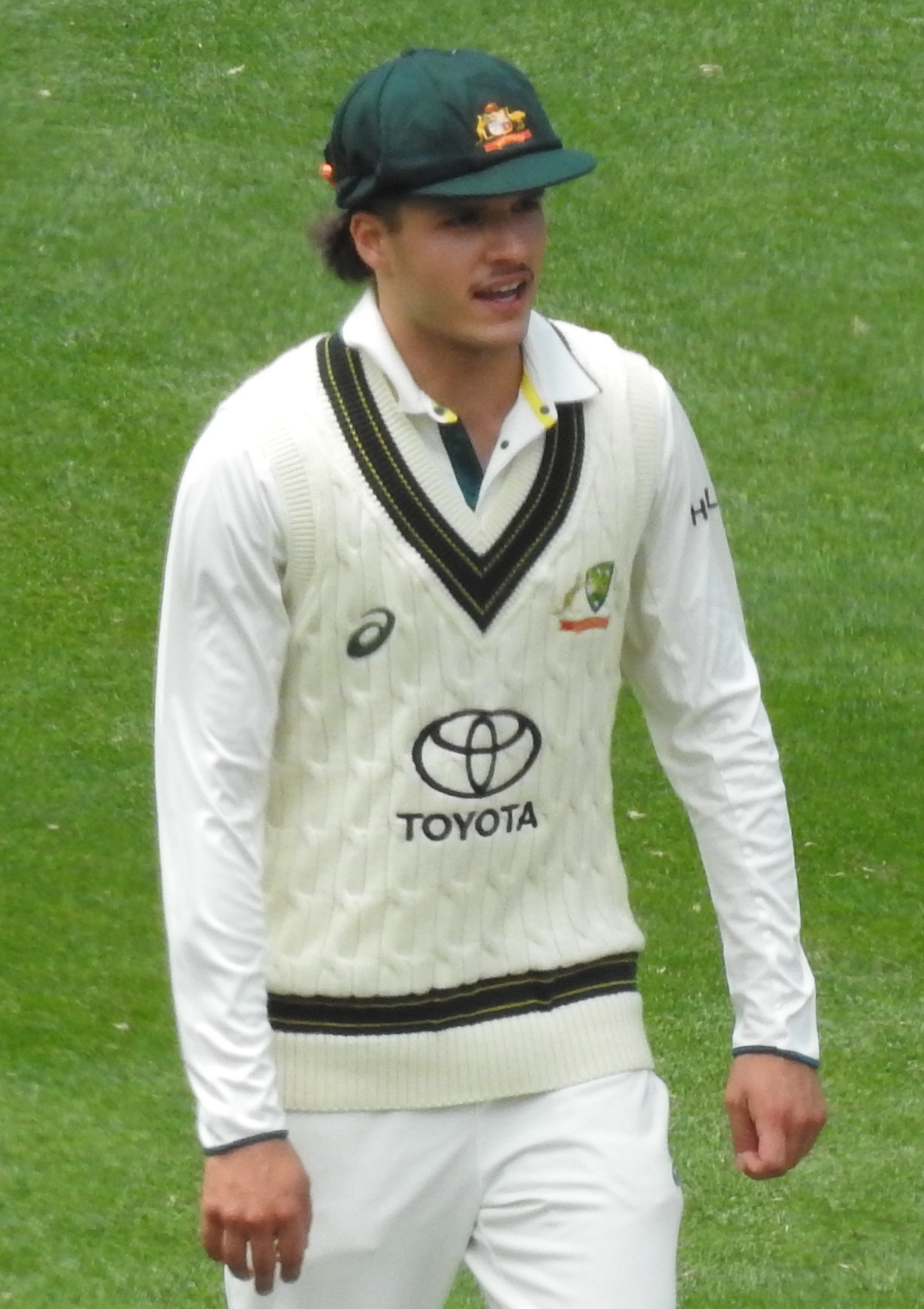
- Konstas in 2024

Personal information
- Full name: Sam James Konstas
- Born: 2 October 2005 (age 21); Kogarah, New South Wales, Australia
- Batting: Right-handed
- Role: Top-order batter

International information
- National side: Australia (2024–present)
- Test debut (cap 468): 26 December 2024 v India
- Last Test: 12 July 2025 v West Indies

Domestic team information
- Years: Team
- 2023/24–present: New South Wales (squad no. 5)
- 2024/25–present: Sydney Thunder (squad no. 5)

Career statistics
Competition	Test	FC	LA	T20
Matches	5	35	12	14
Runs scored	163	2,219	507	273
Batting average	16.30	35.22	42.25	19.50
100s/50s	0/1	5/9	2/1	0/3
Top score	60	152	149	63
Catches/stumpings	5/–	32/–	9/–	4/–
Medal record
Men's cricket
Representing Australia
ICC World Test Championship
Runner-up	2023–2025
- Source: ESPNcricinfo, 25 October 2026

Sam James Konstas (born 2 October 2005) is an Australian international cricketer who plays for the Australian national team, New South Wales in the Sheffield Shield and Sydney Thunder in the Big Bash League. He is a right-handed top-order batter.

== Early and personal life ==
Konstas was born in Kogarah, a suburb of the St. George region of Southern Sydney and is an Australian of Greek descent. He attended Cranbrook School in Sydney's Eastern Suburbs, and grew up supporting NRL team Wests Tigers.

Konstas has a twin brother called Johnny and played his junior cricket for the Kingsgrove Cricket Club.

In a 2025 interview, Konstas stated that in the Australian Football League (AFL), he supports both Collingwood Football Club and the Sydney Swans.

== Domestic career ==
He made his first-class debut against Tasmania in November 2023. In December 2023, Konstas signed his first professional contract for the Sydney Thunder.

Konstas made his first century in first-class cricket against South Australia on 8 October 2024, scoring 152 runs off 241 deliveries. Konstas made another century in the second innings of the same match, making him the youngest player to score back-to-back Sheffield Shield hundreds since Ricky Ponting in 1993. He made his List A debut playing for New South Wales against South Australia on 12 November 2024 during the 2024–25 One-Day Cup.

In December 2024, Konstas made his Big Bash League debut as well as his professional T20 debut playing for Sydney Thunder against Adelaide Strikers in the third match of the 2024–25 Big Bash League season at Manuka Oval, Canberra. In his debut match, Konstas scored the fastest fifty for the Sydney Thunder in Big Bash League history, from 20 deliveries. Konstas finished with a score of 56 runs having hit eight fours and two sixes.

== International career ==
In July 2023, Konstas was named in the squad of the Australia under-19 team for a tour to England against the England under-19 cricket team.

In December 2023, Konstas was named as part of the Australian squad for the 2024 Under-19 Cricket World Cup. He made a century against the West Indies, scoring 108 from 121 balls.

=== India in Australia 2024/25 ===
After a good start to the 2024–25 Sheffield Shield season, Konstas was selected for the India A tour of Australia. In the 2nd innings of the second unofficial Test, Konstas scored 73 not out and, alongside teammate Beau Webster, sealed the win. Konstas was then selected for the Prime-Ministers XI 1 Dec 2024 match against India A. In the shortened game of forty six overs per side, Konstas scored 107 off 97 with 14 fours and a six against bowlers such as Mohammed Siraj and Ravindra Jadeja.

On 20 December 2024, Konstas was named in the Australian 15-man Test squad for the 2024 Boxing Day Test against India. He had his Baggy green presented to him by former Australian Captain Mark Taylor. He was brought in as a replacement to Nathan McSweeney ahead of the fourth Test match in the Border-Gavaskar series. Konstas was preferred over McSweeney due to the lack of form for the latter in his debut Test series, having scored just 72 runs across six innings in three Tests (average of 12.00).

He subsequently made a successful if eventful debut as an opener, scoring a rapid 60 runs, including many unorthodox ramp shots with four fours and two sixes. He reached 50 runs from 52 balls, the third-fastest 50 by an Australian debutant in Test cricket. During Australia's first innings, former Indian captain Virat Kohli shoulder bumped him after an over. Kohli was found guilty of breaching the ICC code of conduct and was penalised 20% of his match fee and the loss of one demerit point.

His next test at the Sydney Cricket Ground was less effective on the field, being dismissed for 23 and 22 runs on the way to an Australian match and series win. Although he was involved in a verbal incident with Indian bowler Jasprit Bumrah in the final over of Day 1, after his opening partner Usman Khawaja was accused of wasting time. After Bumrah dismissed Khawaja shortly after, Bumrah and other Indian players were seen to celebrate towards Konstas.

=== Tour of Sri Lanka 2025 ===
In January 2025, Konstas was named in Australia's squad for their two-match Test series against Sri Lanka. However, he was not selected in either match of the series and was released mid-tour to play in the Sheffield Shield for New South Wales.

=== World Test Championship Final 2025 ===
In May 2025, Konstas was named in Australia's squad for the one-off Test match against South Africa. Although he was not selected to play in the starting XI, he was a substitute fielder for Australia when Steve Smith left the field with a broken finger.

=== Tour of West Indies 2025 ===
In June 2025, Konstas was selected in Australia's starting XI in place of Marnus Labuschagne for the first test of their three-match Test series against West Indies. In the first test Konstas struggled, making scores of just three and five on an inconsistent pitch in Bridgetown, Barbados. He lost both his wickets to fast bowler Shamar Joseph.
