= Sam Elliott (cricketer) =

Australian cricketer (born 2000)

Personal information
- Full name: Samuel M Elliott
- Born: 18 February 2000 (age 26); Mitcham, Victoria, Australia
- Batting: Right-handed
- Bowling: Right-arm fast-medium
- Relatives: Matthew Elliott (father)

Domestic team information
- Years: Team
- 2020/21–present: Victoria
- 2021/22: Melbourne Stars
- 2025/26–present: Melbourne Renegades (squad no. 1)

Career statistics
Competition	FC	LA	T20
Matches	18	28	6
Runs scored	459	280	23
Batting average	19.12	18.66	5.75
100s/50s	0/1	0/0	0/0
Top score	80*	46*	13
Balls bowled	2,944	1,302	95
Wickets	62	46	5
Bowling average	24.82	29.34	25.20
5 wickets in innings	3	2	0
10 wickets in match	0	0	0
Best bowling	5/26	7/12	4/28
Catches/stumpings	5/-	6/-	0/–
- Source: Cricinfo, 18 October 2026

Samuel M. Elliott (born 18 February 2000) is an Australian cricketer.

In May 2019, Elliott was awarded a rookie contract with Victoria ahead of the 2019–20 season. He made his List A debut on 8 April 2021, for Victoria in the 2020–21 Marsh One-Day Cup. He made his Twenty20 debut on 5 December 2021, for the Melbourne Stars in the 2021–22 Big Bash League season. He made his first class debut for Victoria on 24 November 2022, against Tasmania in the 2022–23 Sheffield Shield.

In September 2024, Elliott took 7/12 against Tasmania in the 2024–25 One-Day Cup, the best figures by a Victorian in the domestic one-day competition.

== Personal life ==
Elliott's father, Matthew Elliot, played Test cricket for Australia. His brother, Will, is an Australian rules footballer who currently plays for Werribee Football Club in the Victorian Football League (VFL) after the AFL killed off his old team, the Northern Bullants.
