= Lloyd Pope =

Australian cricketer (born 1999)

Personal information
- Full name: Lloyd Aylmer James Pope
- Born: 1 December 1999 (age 26); Adelaide, South Australia
- Batting: Right-handed
- Bowling: Right-arm leg break
- Role: Bowler

Domestic team information
- Years: Team
- 2017/18–present: South Australia (squad no. 24)
- 2018/19–2022/23: Sydney Sixers (squad no. 7)
- 2023/24–present: Adelaide Strikers (squad no. 24)
- 2025: Northamptonshire (squad no. 16)

Career statistics
Competition	FC	LA	T20
Matches	23	23	67
Runs scored	175	31	18
Batting average	10.29	7.75	2.25
100s/50s	0/0	0/0	0/0
Top score	36	12*	5
Balls bowled	4,344	1,135	1,290
Wickets	63	33	75
Bowling average	47.41	33.30	24.45
5 wickets in innings	3	0	0
10 wickets in match	0	0	0
Best bowling	7/87	4/78	4/22
Catches/stumpings	9/–	4/–	9/–
- Source: Cricinfo, 18 October 2026

Lloyd Aylmer James Pope (born 1 December 1999) is an Australian cricketer who currently represents South Australia and the Adelaide Strikers. A right-arm leg spin bowler, he is known for his effective use of the wrong'un as a variation. Pope was well renowned in his early career for his hair, becoming a cult hero of Australian cricket due to his “flowing red hair”.

== Career ==
In August 2017, he was offered a rookie contract with South Australia. In December 2017, he was named in Australia's squad for the 2018 Under-19 Cricket World Cup. On 23 January 2018, in the Under-19 Cricket World Cup, Pope took figures of 8/35 in Australia's quarter-final match against England. These were the best bowling figures in the history of the Under-19 Cricket World Cup. He was the leading wicket-taker for Australia in the tournament, with eleven dismissals.

He made his first-class debut for South Australia in the 2018–19 Sheffield Shield season on 16 October 2018. Later the same month, in his second first-class match, he took seven wickets for 87 runs in the first innings against Queensland. In doing so, he became the youngest bowler to take a seven-wicket haul in the Sheffield Shield.

He made his Twenty20 debut for Sydney Sixers in the 2018–19 Big Bash League season on 22 December 2018. He made his List A debut for South Australia, on 26 September 2019, in the 2019–20 Marsh One-Day Cup.

Pope was part of the Sydney Sixers title-winning squad in the 2019-20 Big Bash League season, playing eight matches over the season and taking 10 wickets. On 10 October 2020, in the 2020–21 Sheffield Shield, Pope became the first leg spinner in 50 years to take a five-wicket haul on the opening day of a Sheffield Shield season.

During the 2023–24 Big Bash League season, Pope was named as a local replacement player for Travis Head, debuting for the Adelaide Strikers on 5 January 2024. In July 2024, he was officially signed by the Strikers on a three-year deal. Pope was named in the BBL team of the tournament both in 2024-2025, and 2025-2026.

On 4 November 2024, he achieved his third first-class five-wicket haul with fourth innings figures of 6/74 to prevent a draw against Victoria. He was chosen as part of the Prime Minister's XI squad for a day-night match against an Indian XI as part of the 2024–25 Indian tour of Australia.

In May 2025, Pope signed to play for Northamptonshire County Cricket Club in that year's T20 Blast.

Despite sharing a surname and also having red hair, he is not related to fellow South Australian cricketer Katelyn Pope.
