= Raf MacMillan =

Australian cricketer

Personal information
- Full name: Rafael MacMillan
- Born: 1 February 2005 (age 21); New South Wales
- Batting: Right-handed
- Bowling: Right arm off spin

Domestic team information
- Years: Team
- 2024–present: Tasmania
- 2025: Hobart Hurricanes
- LA debut: 3 December 2024 Tasmania v Queensland
- FC debut: 8 February 2025 Tasmania v Victoria

Career statistics
Competition	FC	LA	T20
Matches	2	9	1
Runs scored	67	23	0
Batting average	16.75	4.60	0.00
100s/50s	0/0	0/0	0/0
Top score	47	7	0
Balls bowled	156	390	12
Wickets	2	8	0
Bowling average	55.00	47.12	–
5 wickets in innings	0	0	–
10 wickets in match	0	0	–
Best bowling	1/32	3/29	–
Catches/stumpings	1/–	5/–	0/0
- Source: Cricinfo, 25 October 2026

Rafael MacMillan (born 1 February 2005) is an Australian cricketer who plays for Tasmania. He is a right-handed off-break bowler and right-handed batsman.

== Domestic career ==
MacMillan played club cricket for St George District Cricket Club in New South Wales. He signed a two-year rookie contract with Tasmania in May 2024, having previously spent time in the New South Wales academy system.

He made his One-Day Cup debut for Tasmania against Queensland on 3 December 2024. He made his first class cricket debut for Tasmania against Victoria on 8 February 2025 in the Sheffield Shield.

== International career ==
MacMillan was an important member of the Australia national under-19 cricket team that won the 2024 Under-19 Cricket World Cup in South Africa, taking wickets in every Australia game including 3-16 against England. In the final against India U19, on 11 February 2024, he finished with figures of 3-43 from his ten overs. He received praise for his efforts in the tournament from Australia Under-19 coach Anthony Clark, who described him as "almost the final cog in the wheel ... he's good at what he does".
