= Todd Murphy =

Australian cricketer (born 2000)

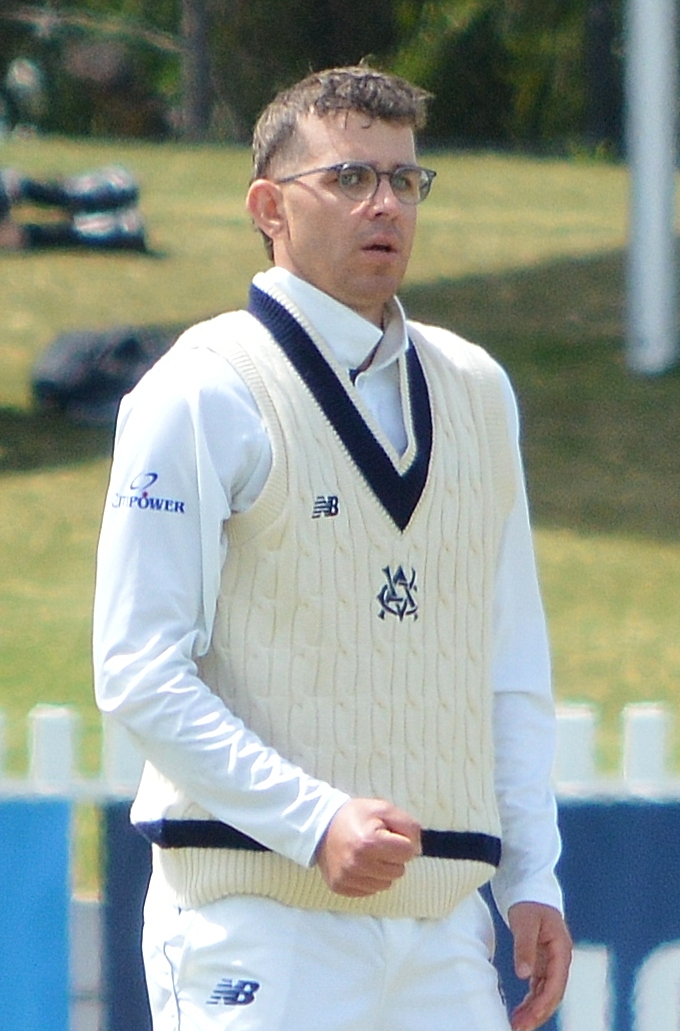
- Murphy in October 2025

Personal information
- Full name: Todd Raymond Murphy
- Born: 15 November 2000 (age 25); Echuca, Victoria, Australia
- Nickname: Goggles
- Batting: Left-handed
- Bowling: Right-arm off spin
- Role: Bowler

International information
- National side: Australia (2023–present)
- Test debut (cap 465): 9 February 2023 v India
- Last Test: 29 January 2025 v Sri Lanka

Domestic team information
- Years: Team
- 2020/21–present: Victoria (squad no. 28)
- 2021/22–present: Sydney Sixers (squad no. 36)
- 2025: Gloucestershire (squad no. 28)

Career statistics
| Competition | Test | FC | LA | T20 |
|---|---|---|---|---|
| Matches | 7 | 52 | 39 | 30 |
| Runs scored | 122 | 1,010 | 128 | 30 |
| Batting average | 13.55 | 17.11 | 7.11 | – |
| 100s/50s | 0/0 | 0/1 | 0/0 | 0/0 |
| Top score | 41 | 76 | 20 | 14* |
| Balls bowled | 1,157 | 9,744 | 1,854 | 414 |
| Wickets | 22 | 140 | 43 | 21 |
| Bowling average | 28.13 | 33.95 | 35.53 | 22.14 |
| 5 wickets in innings | 1 | 1 | 0 | 0 |
| 10 wickets in match | 0 | 0 | 0 | 0 |
| Best bowling | 7/124 | 7/124 | 4/27 | 3/35 |
| Catches/stumpings | 3/– | 19/– | 15/– | 8/– |
Medal record
Men's Cricket
Representing Australia
ICC World Test Championship
| Winner | 2021-2023 |
- Source: ESPNcricinfo, 25 October 2026

Todd Raymond Murphy (born 15 November 2000) is an Australian cricketer. A right-arm off spin bowler, Murphy made his first-class debut for Victoria in April 2021 and his Test debut for Australia in February 2023. He was a member of the Australian team that won the 2023 ICC World Test Championship final.

== Early life ==
Murphy was born in Echuca, Victoria, and raised just across the Murray River in Moama, New South Wales. His father, Jamie Murphy, was a left-handed middle-order batsman who played eight seasons for St Kilda in Victorian Premier Cricket, where he was a teammate of Shane Warne.

Murphy played for Moama Cricket Club as a junior, initially as a top-order batsman and medium-pace bowler. He transitioned to off spin in 2017 after being observed "stuffing around" in the nets by former Victorian leg-spinner, Craig Howard. Murphy spent a season with Sandhurst Cricket Club in the Bendigo District Cricket Association before moving to St Kilda Cricket Club in 2018/19.

== First-class and Test career ==
Murphy made his List A debut on 10 March 2021, for Victoria in the 2020–21 Marsh One-Day Cup. Prior to his List A debut, Murphy was named in Australia's squad for the 2020 Under-19 Cricket World Cup.

Murphy made his first-class debut on 3 April 2021, for Victoria in the 2020–21 Sheffield Shield season, scoring 34 runs and taking one wicket. He made his Twenty20 debut on 26 December 2021, for the Sydney Sixers in the 2021–22 Big Bash League season.

After just seven first-class matches, in 2023, Murphy was named as a member of the Australian Test squad for the team's tour of India. He was one of four spinners selected alongside Nathan Lyon, Ashton Agar, and Mitchell Swepson. In February 2023, Murphy made his Test debut at Nagpur and took figures of 7/124 from 47 overs. He played all four Test matches on the tour, finishing with 14 wickets.

=== 2023 Ashes ===
In April 2023, Murphy was selected for the squad for the 2023 Ashes as the second spinner beyond Nathan Lyon. Following Lyon's return home with a calf injury, Murphy made his Ashes debut at Headingley, Leeds where he took 1/49 from 9.3 overs. Following this Murphy was dropped for the 4th Test which was Australia's first test in 10 years without a spinner. Recalled for the 5th Test, Murphy took 2/22 from 6 overs in the first innings and 4/110 from 22.5 overs in the second.He also scored vital runs; his 34 in the first innings was instrumental in giving Australia a slender first innings lead and he scored 18 in the second innings.

=== 2025 ===
In June 2025, Murphy signed a contract with Gloucestershire County Cricket Club to play in four matches in that year's County Championship.

In December 2025, Murphy was recalled into the Test lineup to replace Nathan Lyon, who got injured during the 3rd Test in Adelaide, to play the Boxing Day Test at the MCG. Ultimately he didn't play in the match though, as stand-in captain Steve Smith decided to go with an all-pace attack instead.

== Playing style ==
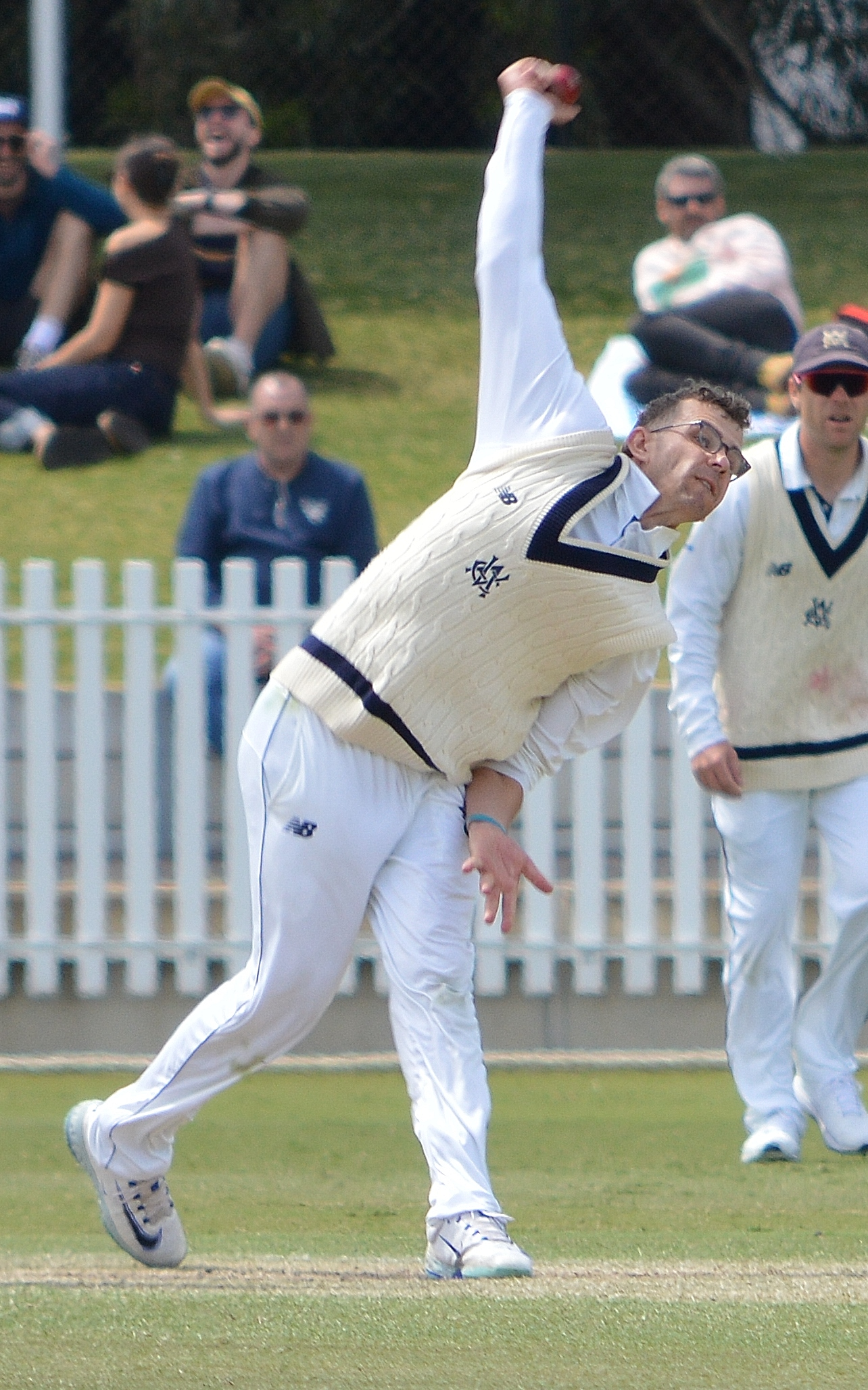
Todd Murphy bowling for Victoria during the Sheffield Shield first class cricket match between Victoria and New South Wales at Junction Oval in Melbourne on 17 October 2025.

Murphy is a right-arm off spin bowler of brisk pace, delivering most of his deliveries in excess of 90 km/h. He bowls with a high, jaunty action that has been compared to that of former England spinner, Graeme Swann. He is a left-handed batsman who bats in the tail, usually at number nine or ten.

Considered a top prospect in Australian cricket, a 2024 Fox Sports Australia article on best young players ranked Murphy as the best young player in Australian cricket.

Murphy wears prescription glasses when batting, bowling and fielding, one of few Test cricketers to have done so.

== Personal life ==
In 2022, Murphy was studying for a Bachelor of Exercise and Sport Science/Bachelor of Business (Sport Management) at Deakin University.

Murphy supports the Collingwood Football Club in the Australian Football League.
