= Campbell Kellaway =

Australian cricketer

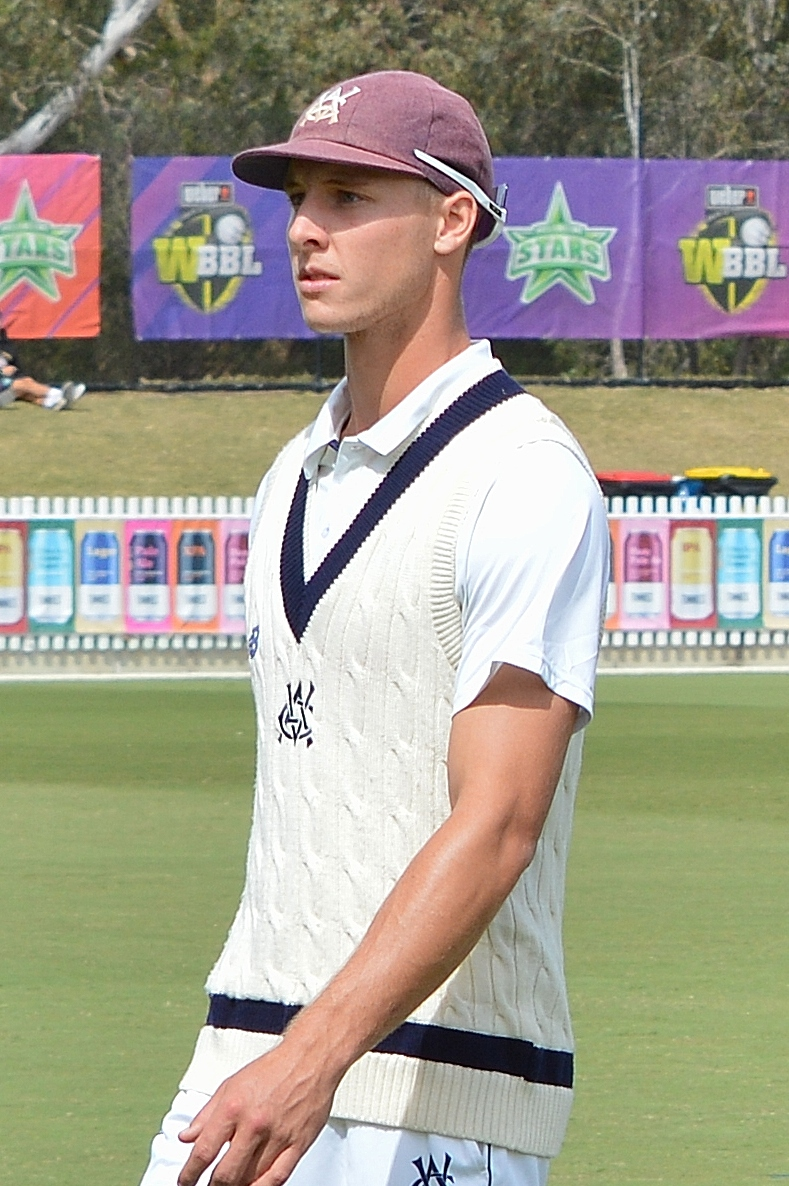
- Kellaway in 2025

Personal information
- Full name: Campbell James Kellaway
- Born: 1 November 2002 (age 24)
- Batting: Left-handed
- Bowling: Left-arm orthodox
- Role: Middle-order batter

Domestic team information
- Years: Team
- 2022/23–present: Victoria
- 2022/23–present: Melbourne Stars

Career statistics
Competition	FC	LA	T20
Matches	47	19	21
Runs scored	2,405	625	255
Batting average	30.06	36.76	18.21
100s/50s	3/14	2/2	0/0
Top score	165*	117*	41*
Balls bowled	321	150	24
Wickets	2	5	0
Bowling average	115.50	23.40	–
5 wickets in innings	0	0	–
10 wickets in match	0	0	–
Best bowling	1/0	2/25	–
Catches/stumpings	30/–	9/–	12/–
- Source: Cricinfo, 25 October 2026

Campbell James Kellaway (born 1 November 2002) is a professional Australian cricketer who plays Australian domestic cricket for Victoria and the Melbourne Stars.

== Cricket career ==
Kellaway represented Australia at the 2022 ICC Under-19 Cricket World Cup and made his List A debut against Queensland in the Marsh One-Day Cup in November 2022. He then made his first class debut for Victoria on 24 November 2022, against Tasmania in the 2022–23 Sheffield Shield. He also signed with the Melbourne Stars, and made his debut against the Hobart Hurricanes in BBL 12 in December.

In December 2022, Kellaway scored an unbeaten century for the Cricket Australia XI against a visiting South African side.

Kellaway made 165 not out in Victoria's second innings of their final game of the 2024-25 Sheffield Shield season, to help the team to victory over Western Australia at the WACA Ground.

== Personal life ==
Kellaway is the nephew of AFL footballers Andrew and Duncan Kellaway.
