= Joel Curtis =

Australian cricketer

Personal information
- Full name: Joel L Curtis
- Born: November 4, 1999 (age 27); Perth, Western Australia
- Batting: Left-handed
- Role: Wicket-keeper-batter

Domestic team information
- Years: Team
- 2023/24–present: Western Australia (squad no. 5)
- 2025/26–present: Perth Scorchers
- FC debut: 28 November 2023 WA v Qld
- List A debut: 13 February 2025 WA v SA

Career statistics
Competition	FC	LA	T20
Matches	19	13	5
Runs scored	733	543	35
Batting average	24.43	41.76	7.00
100s/50s	1/3	1/4	0/0
Top score	119*	116	16
Catches/stumpings	59/4	18/1	2/–
- Source: ESPNcricinfo, 25 October 2026

Joel Curtis (born 4 November 1999) is an Australian cricketer. A wicketkeeper-batter, he made his first-class debut for Western Australia against Queensland on 28 November 2023 in the 2023–24 Sheffield Shield season. In his third first-class match, in November 2024, he top-scored for Western Australia in each innings, with 36 and 119 not out.
