= Angus Lovell =

Australian cricketer (born 1999)

Personal information
- Full name: Angus Charles Ivor Lovell
- Born: 12 September 1999 (age 27); Isle of Wight
- Batting: Right-handed
- Bowling: Right arm off spin

Domestic team information
- Years: Team
- 2024-: Queensland
- FC debut: 3 February 2024 Queensland v Tasmania

Career statistics
Competition	FC	LA
Matches	17	5
Runs scored	659	74
Batting average	21.25	14.80
100s/50s	1/2	0/0
Top score	146*	42
Balls bowled	339	54
Wickets	4	1
Bowling average	59.25	69.00
5 wickets in innings	0	0
10 wickets in match	0	0
Best bowling	3/13	1/31
Catches/stumpings	18/–	3/–
- Source: CricInfo, 23 October 2026

Angus Charles Ivor Lovell (born 12 September 1999) is an Australian cricketer who plays for Queensland. He is a right handed batsman and right-arm off break bowler.

== Early life ==
Lovell was born on the Isle of Wight in England, and lived in New Zealand before his family settled on the Sunshine Coast, Queensland. He attended Matthew Flinders Anglican College and became the youngest player to make his first grade debut for the Sunshine Coast Scorchers, aged 16 years and 35 days. Lovell captained Queensland at under-17 level and under-19 level, and during the 2016-17 Under 17 National Championships he scored 489 runs, and was named the Player of the Championships.

== Career ==
Lovell was included in the Queensland Academy of Sport cricket squad for the 2019–20 season.

He featured for the Queensland cricket team Second XI during the 2023–24 season, and made scores of 84 against Tasmania Second XI and 137 against Western Australia Second XI, leading to a call-up to the Queensland team for his first-class debut against Tasmania in the Sheffield Shield in February 2024. After making four Shield appearances at the end of the season he was awarded a full-time contract in April 2024.

He scored his maiden Sheffield Shield century in November 2024 scoring an unbeaten 146 against New South Wales. He made his One-Day Cup debut for Queensland against Tasmania on 3 December 2024.

== Style of play ==
A tall right-handed batsman, Lovell has been compared in style to the former Australian Test batsman Martin Love.

== Personal life ==
Lovell attended the University of Queensland.
