= Nathan McSweeney =

Australian cricketer (born 1999)

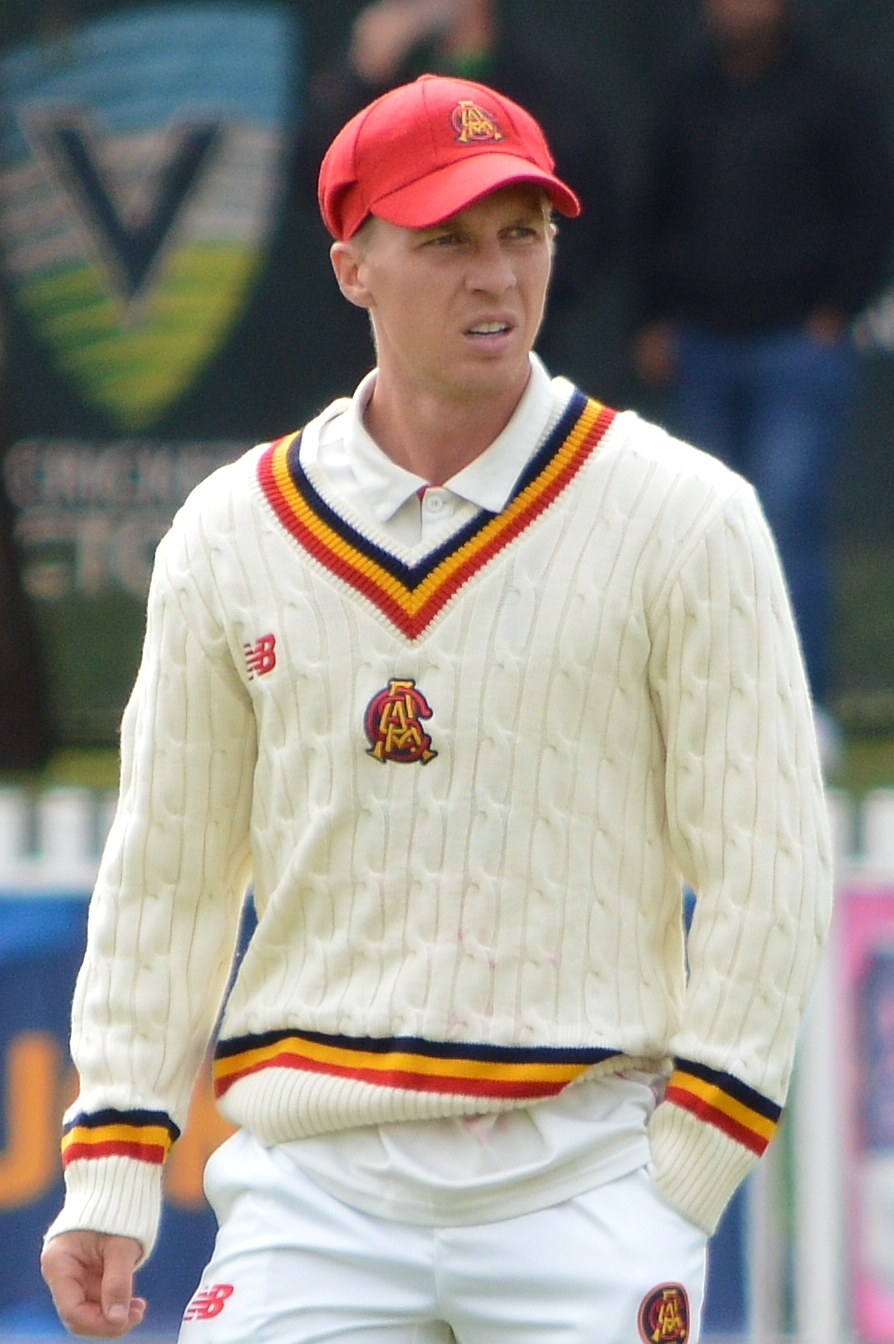
- McSweeney playing First Class cricket with South Australia in March 2026

Personal information
- Full name: Nathan Andrew McSweeney
- Born: 8 March 1999 (age 27); Brisbane, Queensland, Australia
- Nickname: Buddha
- Batting: Right-handed
- Bowling: Right-arm off break
- Role: Top-order batter

International information
- National side: Australia (2024)
- Test debut (cap 467): 22 November 2024 v India
- Last Test: 14 December 2024 v India

Domestic team information
- Years: Team
- 2018/19–2019/20: Queensland (squad no. 38)
- 2019/20: Melbourne Renegades (squad no. 38)
- 2021/22–present: South Australia (squad no. 38)
- 2021/22–present: Brisbane Heat (squad no. 38)
- 2026: Northamptonshire (squad no. 38)

Career statistics
Competition	Test	FC	LA	T20
Matches	3	70	45	47
Runs scored	72	4,394	1,896	1,141
Batting average	14.40	37.87	47.40	28.52
100s/50s	0/0	12/21	3/15	0/6
Top score	39	226*	137	84
Balls bowled	–	2,273	734	97
Wickets	–	31	17	6
Bowling average	–	34.67	38.17	21.00
5 wickets in innings	–	0	0	0
10 wickets in match	–	0	0	0
Best bowling	–	4/89	3/12	3/3
Catches/stumpings	3/–	62/–	26/–	25/–
- Source: ESPNcricinfo, 23 October 2026

Nathan Andrew McSweeney (born 8 March 1999) is an Australian right-handed batter and occasional off spinner who has represented the national team in Test cricket in 2024. In domestic cricket he captains South Australia and plays for Brisbane Heat.

McSweeney previously played for the Queensland Bulls and Melbourne Renegades. He has captained the Australia A and Prime Minister's XI teams.

== Domestic career ==
McSweeney plays for Glenelg in South Australian Premier Cricket.

Prior to his senior debut, McSweeney was named in Australia's squad for the 2018 Under-19 Cricket World Cup. He scored a match-winning 156 runs against Papua New Guinea during the competition. He made his first-class debut for Queensland against Tasmania in the 2018–19 Sheffield Shield season and made his senior Twenty20 debut in January 2020 for Melbourne Renegades in the Big Bash League. He was signed by the Brisbane Heat as a local replacement player for Marnus Labuschagne for the 2021–22 Big Bash League season before being signed to a longer-term contract by the team following a series of successful performances, receiving a two-year deal with the club.

In May 2021, McSweeney moved to South Australia ahead of the 2021/22 domestic season, making his List A debut in September 2021 in the 2021–22 Marsh One-Day Cup. He scored his maiden first-class century in December 2022 against Tasmania.

In March 2023, McSweeney was announced as the captain of Australia A for their tour of New Zealand. Playing in the first unofficial Test, he scored 50 in the first innings and 69 not out in the second.

In the absence of regular captain Usman Khawaja, McSweeney captained Brisbane Heat to their second Big Bash League title during the 2023–24 season. After scoring 307 runs at an average of 51.16 he was named in the 2023–24 Marsh One-Day Cup team of the tournament.

In April 2024, McSweeney was named as the captain of South Australia for the 2024–25 Australian domestic season. He scored his maiden List A century in October 2024, making 137 runs in 131 balls against Queensland.

McSweeney led South Australia to the Sheffield Shield and One-Day Cup titles in his first season as captain, delivering South Australia their first Sheffield Shield title in 29 years, their first One Day title in 13 years. South Australia were the first recipients of the newly introduced Dean Jones Trophy as winners of the One-Day Cup.

In the 2025-26 Sheffield Shield season, McSweeney led South Australia to the Sheffield Shield title once again, this time winning the Final against Victoria by 56 runs, South Australia's first time going back-to-back in the Sheffield Shield in the competition's history. In the match, McSweeney scored 72 runs for the game, which included 52 in South Australia's first innings.

== International career ==
McSweeney captained Australia A against the touring India A side during the 2024–25 season. He opened the batting for the first time in first-class cricket in the second match of the series, having been earmarked for a role as opener for the full Australian side later in the summer. At the conclusion of the match, he was named in Australia's team to play against the touring Indian Test side.

McSweeney made his Test debut in the first match of the series at Perth. He made 10 runs in his first innings in international cricket before recording a duck in his second. He played in the second and third matches of the series, making scores of 39, 10 not out, nine and four before being dropped ahead of the fourth Test match, making way for debutant Sam Konstas. The decision caused some controversy, coming after only three matches.

In January 2025, McSweeney was recalled to the Test squad as part of a two-Test series against Sri Lanka, but didn't play in either match.

== Playing style ==
Usually a conservative batter, McSweeney has the ability to be aggressive when batting with the lower order, most notably scoring 28 runs from an over to reach a century in a tenth-wicket partnership with Harry Conway in March 2024. He is a part-time off break bowler, often being called upon to break partnerships.
