= Corey Rocchiccioli =

Australian cricketer (born 1997)

Personal information
- Full name: Corey James Rocchiccioli
- Born: 8 October 1997 (age 29); Subiaco, Western Australia, Australia
- Nickname: The Rock
- Height: 190 cm (6 ft 3 in)
- Batting: Right-handed
- Bowling: Right-arm off break
- Role: Bowler

Domestic team information
- Years: Team
- 2021/22–present: Western Australia (squad no. 77)
- 2022/23: Melbourne Renegades (squad no. 77)
- 2023/24: Melbourne Stars (squad no. 77)
- 2025: Warwickshire
- 2025/26: Perth Scorchers (squad no. 77)
- 2026/27-present: Sydney Sixers (squad no. 77)

Career statistics
Competition	FC	LA	T20
Matches	56	3	5
Runs scored	927	11	1
Batting average	16.85	5.50	1.00
100s/50s	0/1	0/0	0/0
Top score	50	9	1
Balls bowled	11,199	138	108
Wickets	193	3	6
Bowling average	30.87	42.33	25.66
5 wickets in innings	6	0	0
10 wickets in match	0	0	0
Best bowling	7/52	2/38	2/25
Catches/stumpings	33/–	1/–	2/–
- Source: ESPNcricinfo, 23 October 2026

Corey James Rocchiccioli (born 8 October 1997) is an Australian cricketer who plays for Western Australia as a right-arm off break bowler.

== Early life ==
Rocchiccioli was born on 8 October 1997 in Perth. He is of Italian and Irish heritage.

== Career ==
Rocchiccioli was offered a rookie contract by Western Australia ahead of the 2020/21 season, where he did not play a match, before being elevated to a senior contract prior to the 2021/22 season. He made his first-class debut on 24 September 2021, for Western Australia against South Australia in the opening match of 2021–22 Sheffield Shield season.

Rocchiccioli was added to the Perth Scorchers squad on 8 December 2020 as injury cover for Ashton Agar during BBL|10, however did not feature in any matches. Rocchiccioli made his BBL debut in the 2022/23 season for the Melbourne Renegades.

In October 2024, he was selected for the Australia A squad ahead of the India A tour of Australia.

In June 2025, Rocchiccioli signed a short-term contract to play four English County Championship matches for Warwickshire County Cricket Club.
