= Donovan Koch =

South African cricket umpire (born 1976)

Personal information
- Full name: Donovan Marius Koch
- Born: 11 October 1976 (age 50); Somerset West, Cape Province, South Africa
- Batting: Right-handed
- Bowling: Right-arm medium fast
- Role: Umpire

Umpiring information
- ODIs umpired: 6 (2022–2025)
- T20Is umpired: 15 (2022–2026)
- WTests umpired: 1 (2026)
- WODIs umpired: 7 (2020–2025)
- WT20Is umpired: 7 (2020)
- Source: Cricinfo, 30 January 2023

Donovan Koch (born 11 October 1976) is a South African former cricketer and currently an international umpire. He played twenty-one first-class and twenty List A matches between 1997 and 2002. He is now an umpire in Australia.

He stood in his first Twenty20 International (T20I) match, between Australia and Sri Lanka, on 13 February 2022. On 31 August 2022, he stood in his first One Day International (ODI) match, between Australia and Zimbabwe. As of January 2023, he has officiated in 20 international fixtures.

== See also ==
- List of One Day International cricket umpires
- List of Twenty20 International cricket umpires
