= 2025–26 Sheffield Shield season =

Cricket tournament

2025–26 Sheffield Shield
- Dates: 4 October 2025 – 30 March 2026
- Administrator: Cricket Australia
- Cricket format: First-class
- Tournament format(s): Double round-robin and final
- Champions: South Australia (15th title)
- Participants: 6
- Matches: 31
- Official website: 2025–26 Sheffield Shield

The 2025–26 Sheffield Shield season was the 124th season of the Australian interstate domestic first-class cricket competition. Cricket Australia revealed the season fixtures in July of 2025. The season started on 4 October 2025, and the final was played from 26 to 30 March 2026. South Australia won the title, defeating Victoria by 56 runs and securing back-to-back titles for the first time in their history.

== Points table ==
Pos	Team	Pld	W	L	T	D	Bat	Bowl	Ded	Pts	Qualification
1	Victoria	10	7	2	0	1	8.56	9.3	0	60.86	Advance to the final
2	South Australia (C)	10	4	2	0	4	7.61	9.2	0	44.81	Advance to the final
3	Queensland	10	3	4	0	3	8.18	8.2	0	37.38	
4	Tasmania	10	4	4	0	2	3.73	8.5	2	36.23	
5	New South Wales	10	2	4	0	4	6.94	8.6	0	31.54	
6	Western Australia	10	1	5	0	4	2.95	9.2	0	22.15	

Source: Cricket.com.au, ESPNcricinfo
(C) Champion

== Round–robin ==
Visitor team →	NSW	QLD	SA	TAS	VIC	WA
Home team ↓	NSW	QLD	SA	TAS	VIC	WA
New South Wales		NSW; 341 runs	Match drawn	Tasmania; Inns & 58 runs	Victoria; 300 runs	Match drawn
Queensland	Match drawn		SA; 7 wickets	Match drawn	Queensland; 7 wickets	Match drawn
South Australia	SA; 9 wickets	Queensland; 7 wickets		SA; 10 wickets	Victoria; 4 wickets	Match drawn
Tasmania	Match drawn	Tasmania; 140 runs	SA; 3 wickets		Victoria; 70 runs	Tasmania; 3 runs
Victoria	Victoria; 38 runs	Queensland; 36 runs	Match drawn	Victoria; 144 runs		Victoria; 6 wickets
Western Australia	NSW; 74 runs	WA; 1 wicket	Match drawn	Tasmania; 22 runs	Victoria; 353 runs	

Home team won	Visitor team won

- Note: Results listed are according to the home (horizontal) and visitor (vertical) teams.
- Note: Click on a result to see a summary of the match.

=== Round 1 ===
4–7 October 2025
Scorecard

Tasmania	v	Queensland (H)
379 (110.3 overs); Jordan Silk 104 (170); Michael Neser 4/75 (24 overs)		612 (144.4 overs); Marnus Labuschagne 160 (206); Nikhil Chaudhary 5/108 (24 overs)
7/317 (103 overs); Nikhil Chaudhary 76* (80); Jack Wildermuth 2/45 (16.1 overs)

Match drawn
Allan Border Field, Brisbane
Umpires: Sam Nogajski and Troy Penman
Player of the match: Marnus Labuschagne (Queensland)

- Tasmania won the toss and elected to bat.
- Nikhil Chaudhary (Tasmania) and Hugh Weibgen (Queensland) both made their first-class debuts.
- Michael Neser (Queensland) took his 400th wicket in first-class cricket.
- Nikhil Chaudhary (Tasmania) took his maiden five-wicket haul in first-class cricket.
- Points: Queensland 3.53, Tasmania 2.51

4–7 October 2025
Scorecard

(H) South Australia	v	Victoria
9/350d (113.2 overs); Henry Hunt 126 (307); Mitchell Perry 4/75 (24 overs)		9/343d (100 overs); Peter Handscomb 103 (180); Lloyd Pope 3/87 (27 overs)
223 (78.5 overs); Harry Nielsen 52 (88); Doug Warren 5/69 (24.5 overs)		6/231 (70.4 overs); Oliver Peake 70* (147); Jordan Buckingham 3/43 (17 overs)

Victoria won by 4 wickets
Adelaide Oval, Adelaide
Umpires: Donovan Koch and Ben Treloar
Player of the match: Doug Warren (Victoria)

- Victoria won the toss and elected to field.
- Fergus O'Neill (Victoria) scored his 1,000th run in first-class cricket.
- Doug Warren (Victoria) took his maiden five-wicket haul in first-class cricket.
- Points: Victoria 8.03, South Australia 1.77

4–7 October 2025
Scorecard

New South Wales	v	Western Australia (H)
170 (62.5 overs); William Salzmann 43 (72); Ashton Agar 3/5 (5.5 overs)		161 (61.5 overs); Hilton Cartwright 34 (54); Ryan Hadley 5/38 (17 overs)
221 (74.3 overs); William Salzmann 72 (130); Matthew Kelly 5/43 (23 overs)		156 (55.1 overs); Ashton Agar 42 (59); Liam Hatcher 4/49 (12 overs)

New South Wales won by 74 runs
WACA Ground, Perth
Umpires: Gerard Abood and Michael Graham-Smith
Player of the match: Will Salzmann (New South Wales)

- Western Australia won the toss and elected to field.
- Only 25.1 overs were played on day 1 due to rain and a wet outfield.
- Will Salzmann (New South Wales) made his first-class debut.
- Ryan Hadley (New South Wales) and Matthew Kelly (Western Australia) both took their maiden five-wicket haul in first-class cricket.
- Cameron Gannon (Western Australia) took his 200th wicket in first-class cricket.
- Points: New South Wales 7, Western Australia 1

=== Round 2 ===
15–17 October 2025
Scorecard

(H) Victoria	v	New South Wales
240 (68.5 overs); Peter Handscomb 85 (144); Liam Hatcher 5/88 (14.5 overs)		163 (50.5 overs); Matthew Gilkes 41 (99); Fergus O'Neill 5/26 (16 overs)
177 (65 overs); Campbell Kellaway 47 (97); Liam Hatcher 3/29 (10 overs)		216 (60.4 overs); Oliver Davies 64 (73); Scott Boland 5/67 (15.4 overs)

Victoria won by 38 runs
Junction Oval, Melbourne
Umpires: Stephen Dionysius and Troy Penman
Player of the match: Scott Boland (Victoria)

- New South Wales won the toss and elected to field.
- Charlie Stobo replaced Sean Abbott as an injury substitute for New South Wales during Victoria's first innings.
- Liam Hatcher (New South Wales) took his maiden five-wicket haul in first-class cricket.
- Points: Victoria 7.4, New South Wales 1

15–18 October 2025
Scorecard

(H) Tasmania	v	Western Australia
171 (53.4 overs); Jake Doran 41* (53); Liam Haskett 3/26 (10 overs)		172 (59.5 overs); Hilton Cartwright 36 (41); Bradley Hope 4/51 (12.5 overs)
259 (73.4 overs); Jake Weatherald 94 (99); Matthew Kelly 6/49 (18.4 overs)		255 (91.2 overs); Aaron Hardie 61 (125); Riley Meredith 3/41 (21 overs)

Tasmania won by 3 runs
Bellerive Oval, Hobart
Umpires: Michael Graham-Smith and Roberto Howard
Player of the match: Jake Weatherald (Tasmania)

- Western Australia won the toss and elected to field.
- Points: Tasmania 5, Western Australia 1

15–18 October 2025
Scorecard

(H) South Australia	v	Queensland
228 (84.3 overs); Conor McInerney 60 (163); Michael Neser 4/30 (15.3 overs)		398 (97.3 overs); Marnus Labuschagne 159 (197); Wes Agar 5/88 (18 overs)
308 (110.2 overs); Jason Sangha 55 (116); Mitchell Swepson 6/109 (42.2 overs)		3/139 (40 overs); Angus Lovell 72* (115); Jordan Buckingham 2/23 (8 overs)

Queensland won by 7 wickets
Adelaide Oval, Adelaide
Umpires: Daryl Brigham and Ben Treloar
Player of the match: Mitchell Swepson (Queensland)

- Queensland won the toss and elected to field.
- Lachlan Hearne (Queensland) scored his maiden century in first-class cricket.
- Points: Queensland 8.98, South Australia 1.28

=== Round 3 ===
28–31 October 2025
Scorecard

New South Wales	v	Queensland (H)
7/429d (116.5 overs); Kurtis Patterson 122 (261); James Bazley 3/80 (16.5 overs)		8/347d (106 overs); Jack Clayton 113 (236); Liam Hatcher 3/42 (17 overs)
1/79 (27 overs); Sam Konstas 41 (64); Samuel Skelly 1/4 (3 overs)

Match drawn
The Gabba, Brisbane
Umpires: Stephen Dionysius and Michael Graham-Smith
Player of the match: Kurtis Patterson (New South Wales)

- Queensland won the toss and elected to field.
- No play was possible on day 1 due to rain.
- Samuel Skelly (Queensland) and Ryan Hicks (New South Wales) both made their first-class debuts.
- Points: New South Wales 3.35, Queensland 2.69

28–31 October 2025
Scorecard

(H) Victoria	v	Tasmania
256 (90.5 overs); Peter Handscomb 48 (157); Riley Meredith 3/37 (15 overs)		232 (80.4 overs); Jake Doran 73 (156); Mitchell Perry 5/58 (17.4 overs)
5/330d (97 overs); Campbell Kellaway 147 (268); Riley Meredith 3/87 (20 overs)		210 (83.1 overs); Tim Ward 52 (94); Fergus O'Neill 4/54 (25 overs)

Victoria won by 144 runs
Junction Oval, Melbourne
Umpires: Gerard Abood and Sharad Patel
Player of the match: Campbell Kellaway (Victoria)

- Tasmania won the toss and elected to field.
- Points: Victoria 7.56, Tasmania 1.32

28–31 October 2025
Scorecard

South Australia	v	Western Australia (H)
215 (59 overs); Jake Lehmann 96 (126); Corey Rocchiccioli 3/35 (13 overs)		307 (110.2 overs); Cameron Bancroft 122 (255); Brendan Doggett 6/48 (21.2 overs)
8/394d (125 overs); Nathan McSweeney 103 (168); Cooper Connolly 2/59 (15 overs)		6/195 (69 overs); Cameron Bancroft 58 (93); Liam Scott 3/26 (11 overs)

Match drawn
WACA Ground, Perth
Umpires: Andrew Crozier and Ben Treloar
Player of the match: Brendan Doggett (South Australia)

- Western Australia won the toss and elected to field.
- Points: South Australia 1.85, Western Australia 2.66

=== Round 4 ===
10–12 November 2025
Scorecard

Victoria	v	New South Wales (H)
382 (103.1 overs); Peter Handscomb 104 (210); Mitchell Starc 4/91 (18 overs)		128 (49.5 overs); Steve Smith 57 (89); Sam Elliott 5/26 (8.5 overs)
9/171d (63.3 overs); Marcus Harris 58 (143); Sean Abbott 4/18 (9 overs)		125 (39.4 overs); Steve Smith 56* (98); Sam Elliott 3/24 (9.4 overs)

Victoria won by 300 runs
Sydney Cricket Ground, Sydney
Umpires: Andrew Crozier and Troy Penman
Player of the match: Peter Handscomb (Victoria)

- Victoria won the toss and elected to bat.
- Ryan Hicks replaced Will Salzmann as an injury substitute for New South Wales during Victoria's first innings.
- Sam Elliott (Victoria) took his maiden five-wicket haul in first-class cricket.
- Points: Victoria 8.75, New South Wales 0.9

10–12 November 2025
Scorecard

(H) Tasmania	v	South Australia
209 (64.2 overs); Jordan Silk 64 (105); Brendan Doggett 5/66 (19.2 overs)		177 (48 overs); Alex Carey 59 (63); Beau Webster 5/50 (13 overs)
184 (51.5 overs); Caleb Jewell 41 (49); Henry Thornton 3/23 (8.5 overs)		7/219 (51.5 overs); Liam Scott 53 (79); Gabe Bell 3/59 (16 overs)

South Australia won by 3 wickets
Bellerive Oval, Hobart
Umpires: Gerard Abood and Mitch Claydon
Player of the match: Liam Scott (South Australia)

- South Australia won the toss and elected to field.
- Points: South Australia 7, Tasmania 1.09

11–14 November 2025
Scorecard

Queensland	v	Western Australia (H)
390 (105 overs); Matt Renshaw 101 (198); Cameron Gannon 4/88 (23 overs)		7/322d (107.3 overs); Cameron Green 94 (172); Michael Neser 2/47 (20.3 overs)
203 (58.3 overs); Jack Clayton 54 (109); Corey Rocchiccioli 5/47 (14 overs)		9/272 (82.3 overs); Sam Whiteman 81 (170); Xavier Bartlett 3/25 (15 overs)

Western Australia won by 1 wicket
WACA Ground, Perth
Umpires: Abhijeet Bengeri (Ind) and Ben Treloar (Aus)
Player of the match: Corey Rocchiccioli (Western Australia)

- Western Australia won the toss and elected to field.
- Points: Western Australia 7.65, Queensland 2.38

=== Round 5 ===
22–25 November 2025
Scorecard

(H) New South Wales	v	Tasmania
9/391d (100.4 overs); Kurtis Patterson 80 (158); Riley Meredith 3/77 (21 overs)		8/623d (154.1 overs); Nikhil Chaudhary 163 (184); Tanveer Sangha 4/175 (52.1 overs)
174 (91.5 overs); Lachlan Shaw 44 (97); Gabe Bell 3/30 (20 overs)

Tasmania won by an innings and 58 runs
Cricket Central, Sydney
Umpires: Phillip Gillespie (Aus) and Riki Wessels (Eng)
Player of the match: Nikhil Chaudhary (Tasmania)

- Tasmania won the toss and elected to field.
- Jackson Bird replaced Aidan O'Connor as an concussion substitute for Tasmania during New South Wales' first innings.
- Nikhil Chaudhary (Tasmania) scored his maiden century in first-class cricket.
- Charlie Wakim replaced Mitchell Owen as an injury substitute for Tasmania during Tasmania's first innings.
- Points: Tasmania 8.42, New South Wales 2.07

22–24 November 2025 (D/N)
Scorecard

Victoria	v	Queensland (H)
9/318d (83 overs); Sam Harper 85 (115); Sam Geyer 4/102 (16 overs)		430 (129.1 overs); Matt Renshaw 112 (192); Will Sutherland 3/63 (20.1 overs)
143 (53 overs); Matthew Short 54 (85); Gurinder Sandhu 5/23 (16 overs)		3/32 (6.2 overs); Lachlan Hearne 11* (9); Mitchell Perry 2/22 (3 overs)

Queensland won by 7 wickets
The Gabba, Brisbane
Umpires: Abhijeet Bengeri (Ind) and Michael Graham-Smith (Aus)
Player of the match: Gurinder Sandhu (Queensland)

- Victoria won the toss and elected to bat.
- Sam Geyer (Queensland) made his first-class debut.
- Points: Queensland 8.4, Victoria 1.88

22–25 November 2025 (D/N)
Scorecard

Western Australia	v	South Australia (H)
188 (66.3 overs); Jayden Goodwin 53 (106); Henry Thornton 3/25 (14 overs)		333 (105.5 overs); Nathan McSweeney 68 (140); Liam Haskett 3/89 (24 overs)
6/324 (113 overs); Cooper Connolly 70 (135); Henry Thornton 3/77 (28 overs)

Match drawn
Adelaide Oval, Adelaide
Umpires: Andrew Crozier and Eloise Sheridan
Player of the match: Henry Thornton (South Australia)

- Western Australia won the toss and elected to bat.
- No play was possible on day 1 due to rain.
- Points: South Australia 3.13, Western Australia 1.8

=== Round 6 ===
4–7 December 2025
Scorecard

Western Australia	v	Victoria (H)
194 (75.2 overs); Aaron Hardie 53 (73); Sam Elliott 5/33 (19.2 overs)		255 (95.1 overs); Blake Macdonald 79 (145); Cameron Gannon 5/47 (23 overs)
255 (104.4 overs); Sam Whiteman 103 (252); Matthew Short 4/57 (20 overs)		4/195 (38.5 overs); Blake Macdonald 109* (116); Brody Couch 3/34 (8 overs)

Victoria won by 6 wickets
Melbourne Cricket Ground, Melbourne
Umpires: Daryl Brigham and Michael Graham-Smith
Player of the match: Blake Macdonald (Victoria)

- Victoria won the toss and elected to field.
- Only 38 overs play was possible on day 3 due to rain.
- Blake Macdonald (Victoria) scored his maiden century in first-class cricket.
- Points: Victoria 7.55, Western Australia 1

5–7 December 2025
Scorecard

(H) New South Wales	v	Queensland
7/471d (135.2 overs); Sam Konstas 116 (185); Tom Straker 2/61 (26 overs)		92 (52.1 overs); Jack Clayton 14 (40); Charlie Stobo 5/9 (15.1 overs)
4/143d (29.1 overs); Sam Konstas 53 (58); Mitchell Swepson 3/37 (8.1 overs)		181 (41.1 overs); Hugo Burdon 59 (86); Tanveer Sangha 3/30 (8 overs)

New South Wales won by 341 runs
Sydney Cricket Ground, Sydney
Umpires: Gerard Abood and Ben Treloar
Player of the match: Charlie Stobo (New South Wales)

- New South Wales won the toss and elected to bat.
- Joel Davies (New South Wales) made his first-class debut.
- Charlie Stobo (New South Wales) took his maiden five-wicket haul in first-class cricket.
- Benji Floros replaced Sam Geyer as a concussion substitute for Queensland during their second innings.
- Points: New South Wales 8.23, Queensland 0.4

5–7 December 2025
Scorecard

Tasmania	v	South Australia (H)
195 (71.1 overs); Ruwantha Kellepotha 50 (104); Jordan Buckingham 4/49 (18 overs)		426 (88.2 overs); Liam Scott 147 (171); Jackson Bird 3/89 (23 overs)
260 (74.2 overs); Tim Ward 66 (132); Jordan Buckingham 4/58 (20 overs)		0/30 (5.5 overs); Mackenzie Harvey 20* (21)

South Australia won by 10 wickets
Adelaide Oval, Adelaide
Umpires: Troy Penman and Eloise Sheridan
Player of the match: Liam Scott (South Australia)

- Tasmania won the toss and elected to bat.
- Mackenzie Harvey (South Australia) made his first-class debut.
- Liam Scott (South Australia) scored his maiden century in first-class cricket.
- Points: South Australia 9.26, Tasmania 1

=== Round 7 ===
5–8 February 2026
Scorecard

(H) New South Wales	v	South Australia
202 (55.1 overs); Sam Konstas 44 (110); Nathan McAndrew 4/23 (12 overs)		197 (62.5 overs); Jason Sangha 59 (115); Liam Hatcher 4/41 (18 overs)
8/440d (123 overs); Kurtis Patterson 173* (302); Nathan McAndrew 3/68 (17 overs)		2/118 (54 overs); Mackenzie Harvey 62* (167); Joel Davies 1/8 (12 overs)

Match drawn
Sydney Cricket Ground, Sydney
Umpires: Phillip Gillespie and Chris Grant
Player of the match: Kurtis Patterson (New South Wales)

- New South Wales won the toss and elected to bat.
- Points: New South Wales 2.02, South Australia 2

5–8 February 2026
Scorecard

Queensland	v	Victoria (H)
149 (60 overs); Hugo Burdon 43 (104); Sam Elliott 4/43 (16 overs)		144 (57.2 overs); Peter Handscomb 67 (140); Michael Neser 3/15 (13 overs)
236 (86.1 overs); Hugo Burdon 43 (90); Fergus O'Neill 3/36 (19.1 overs)		205 (85.1 overs); Dylan Brasher 72 (218); Tom Straker 4/32 (14.1 overs)

Queensland won by 36 runs
Melbourne Cricket Ground, Melbourne
Umpires: Mitch Claydon and Andrew Crozier
Player of the match: Hugo Burdon (Queensland)

- Victoria won the toss and elected to field.
- Dylan Brasher (Victoria) and Jem Ryan (Queensland) both made their first-class debuts.
- Harry Dixon replaced Thomas Rogers as an injury substitute for Victoria during Victoria's first innings.
- Points: Queensland 7, Victoria 1

5–8 February 2026
Scorecard

Tasmania	v	Western Australia (H)
239 (73 overs); Jordan Silk 55 (142); Cameron Gannon 4/49 (18 overs)		155 (45.3 overs); Corey Rocchiccioli 36 (60); Billy Stanlake 4/35 (11 overs)
260 (75.1 overs); Jake Doran 74 (145); Jhye Richardson 4/54 (19 overs)		322 (113.4 overs); Cameron Bancroft 74 (135); Gabe Bell 6/82 (32.4 overs)

Tasmania won by 22 runs
WACA Ground, Perth
Umpires: Stephen Dionysius and Sharad Patel
Player of the match: Gabe Bell (Tasmania)

- Western Australia won the toss and elected to field.
- Points: Tasmania 7.39, Western Australia 1

=== Round 8 ===
16–18 February 2026
Scorecard

(H) Queensland	v	South Australia
185 (66.5 overs); Jimmy Peirson 52 (117); Liam Scott 5/33 (15.5 overs)		214 (72.1 overs); Jake Lehmann 74 (123); Jem Ryan 3/58 (14 overs)
119 (51 overs); Lachlan Hearne 53 (65); Nathan McAndrew 5/32 (15 overs)		3/91 (37 overs); Henry Hunt 29 (78); Jem Ryan 2/16 (10 overs)

South Australia won by 7 wickets
The Gabba, Brisbane
Umpires: Roberto Howard and Troy Penman
Player of the match: Liam Scott (South Australia)

- South Australia won the toss and elected to field.
- Campbell Thompson (South Australia) made his first-class debut.
- Points: South Australia 7.14, Queensland 1

16–19 February 2026
Scorecard

Victoria	v	Western Australia (H)
9/431d (116.5 overs); Sam Harper 119 (109); Brody Couch 3/91 (21 overs)		238 (80.2 overs); Sam Fanning 99 (175); Sam Elliott 5/75 (15.2 overs)
4/274d (59 overs); Sam Harper 141* (156); Corey Rocchiccioli 2/71 (16 overs)		114 (44.5 overs); Joel Curtis 59 (80); Scott Boland 6/22 (11.5 overs)

Victoria won by 353 runs
WACA Ground, Perth
Umpires: Michael Graham-Smith and Riki Wessels
Player of the match: Sam Harper (Victoria)

- Western Australia won the toss and elected to field.
- Kade Povey (Western Australia) made his first-class debut.
- Points: Victoria 8.59, Western Australia 1.08

16–19 February 2026 (D/N)
Scorecard

(H) Tasmania	v	New South Wales
136 (41.3 overs); Charlie Wakim 58 (109); Liam Hatcher 5/51 (11 overs)		356 (112.4 overs); Josh Philippe 81 (143); Riley Meredith 3/66 (20.4 overs)
454 (137.5 overs); Beau Webster 108* (260); Ryan Hadley 3/107 (29.5 overs)		5/128 (37 overs); Sam Konstas 35 (48); Riley Meredith 4/40 (11 overs)

Match drawn
Bellerive Oval, Hobart
Umpires: Gerard Abood and Sharad Patel
Player of the match: Beau Webster (Tasmania)

- Tasmania won the toss and elected to bat.
- Charlie Anderson made his first-class debut after replacing Jack Edwards as an injury substitute for New South Wales during their first innings.
- Aidan O'Connor replaced Gabe Bell as an injury substitute for Tasmania during New South Wales' first innings.
- Points: Tasmania 1.5, New South Wales 3.26

=== Round 9 ===
5–8 March 2026
Scorecard

Western Australia	v	(H) Queensland
210 (73.1 overs); Sam Fanning 62 (132); Jem Ryan 3/48 (16 overs)		173 (66 overs); Jem Ryan 33 (44); Albert Esterhuysen 4/37 (13 overs)
229 (87.4 overs); Sam Fanning 87 (146); Marnus Labuschagne 4/22 (12 overs)		6/44 (24 overs); Marnus Labuschagne 13 (24); Cameron Gannon 3/27 (11 overs)

Match drawn
Allan Border Field, Brisbane
Umpires: Ben Treloar and Shawn Craig
Player of the match: Sam Fanning (Western Australia)

- Western Australia won the toss and elected to bat.
- Albert Esterhuysen (Western Australia) and Steve McGiffin (Queensland) both made their first-class debuts.
- Tom Straker replaced Jack Wildermuth as an injury substitute for Queensland during Western Australia's second innings.
- Points: Western Australia 2.1, Queensland 2

5–7 March 2026
Scorecard

Victoria	v	(H) Tasmania
222 (64.5 overs); Sam Harper 93 (115); Riley Meredith 4/53 (15 overs)		91 (43.2 overs); Matthew Kuhnemann 23 (47); Fergus O'Neill 3/17 (14 overs)
193 (52.4 overs); Peter Handscomb 47 (102); Beau Webster 3/25 (11 overs)		254 (83.2 overs); Tim Ward 66 (116); Mitchell Perry 5/45 (17 overs)

Victoria won by 70 runs
Bellerive Oval, Hobart
Umpires: Phillip Gillespie and Troy Penman
Player of the match: Sam Harper (Victoria)

- Tasmania won the toss and elected to field.
- Points: Victoria 7.22, Tasmania 1

5–7 March 2026
Scorecard

New South Wales	v	(H) South Australia
269 (76.2 overs); Joel Davies 47 (67); Henry Thornton 5/71 (20.2 overs)		373 (99.2 overs); Jason Sangha 115 (178); Liam Hatcher 4/116 (23 overs)
198 (71.1 overs); Lachlan Shaw 64 (124); Nathan McAndrew 6/55 (20 overs)		1/96 (19.3 overs); Travis Head 58 (48); Ryan Hadley 1/11 (5 overs)

South Australia won by 9 wickets
Karen Rolton Oval, Adelaide
Umpires: Chris Grant and Michael Graham-Smith
Player of the match: Nathan McAndrew (South Australia)

- South Australia won the toss and elected to field.
- Points: South Australia 8.73, New South Wales 1.69

=== Round 10 ===
14–17 March 2026
Scorecard

(H) New South Wales	v	Western Australia
232 (73.2 overs); Josh Philippe 52 (77); Corey Rocchiccioli 5/62 (20.2 overs)		333 (112.4 overs); Cameron Green 135 (254); Charlie Stobo 4/49 (22.4 overs)
8/373d (105 overs); Josh Philippe 72 (77); Joel Paris 2/34 (23 overs)		9/139 (70 overs); Cameron Green 25 (43); Liam Hatcher 3/24 (16 overs)

Match drawn
Cricket Central, Sydney
Umpires: Gerard Abood and Michael Graham-Smith
Player of the match: Cameron Green (Western Australia)

- Western Australia won the toss and elected to field.
- Points: New South Wales 2.02, Western Australia 2.86

14–17 March 2026
Scorecard

South Australia	v	(H) Victoria
305 (95.4 overs); Henry Hunt 81 (170); Todd Murphy 4/67 (24.4 overs)		308 (113.2 overs); Campbell Kellaway 66 (142); Nathan McSweeney 3/18 (15.2 overs)
3/204d (64 overs); Jason Sangha 57* (96); Scott Boland 1/10 (8 overs)

Match drawn
Junction Oval, Melbourne
Umpires: Shawn Craig and Phillip Gillespie
Player of the match: Henry Hunt (South Australia)

- Victoria won the toss and elected to field.
- Points: Victoria 2.88, South Australia 2.65

14–17 March 2026
Scorecard

(H) Tasmania	v	Queensland
198 (58.1 overs); Jake Weatherald 39 (46); Michael Neser 5/37 (12.1 overs)		178 (71.2 overs); Lachlan Hearne 48 (88); Lawrence Neil-Smith 4/49 (18 overs)
341 (121.5 overs); Jordan Silk 82 (179); Mitchell Swepson 4/47 (27.5 overs)		221 (82.1 overs); Xavier Bartlett 36 (40); Beau Webster 4/53 (20 overs)

Tasmania won by 140 runs
Bellerive Oval, Hobart
Umpires: Donovan Koch and Sam Nogajski
Player of the match: Jake Doran (Tasmania)

- Queensland won the toss and elected to field.
- Thomas Balkin (Queensland) made his first-class debut.
- Hayden Kerr replaced Thomas Balkin as an injury substitute for Queensland during their first innings.
- Points: Tasmania 7, Queensland 1

== Final ==
26–30 March 2026
Scorecard

South Australia	v	Victoria (H)
198 (76.4 overs); Nathan McSweeney 52 (127); Will Sutherland 4/54 (17.4 overs)		261 (91 overs); Fergus O'Neill 64* (136); Henry Thornton 3/58 (17 overs)
258 (81.3 overs); Alex Carey 103 (168); Scott Boland 3/78 (21 overs)		139 (49.5 overs); Marcus Harris 35 (92); Henry Thornton 3/12 (8.5 overs)

South Australia won by 56 runs
Junction Oval, Melbourne
Umpires: Shawn Craig and Sam Nogajski
Player of the match: Nathan McAndrew

- Victoria won the toss and elected to field.
- Only 28 overs of play was possible on day 1 due to rain.

== See also ==
- 2025–26 One-Day Cup
