= Australian Cricketers' Association =

Representative body of Australian professional cricketers

- Founded: 1997
- Headquarters: Cremorne, Victoria
- Location: Australia
- Key people: Christina Matthews, President; Paul Marsh, CEO; Greg Dyer, Chairman
- Website: auscricket.com.au

The Australian Cricketers' Association (ACA) is an organisation that represents the professional first-class cricketers of Australia, both past and present. It is not a formally registered Trade Union, but an Incorporated Association.

== History ==
The Australian Cricketer's Association was founded in February 1997 with inaugural president Tim May and was originally served first-class cricketers exclusively.

In 2010, ACA expressed their displeasure towards Cricket Australia (CA) due to the understanding or deal between Board of Control for Cricket in India (BCCI) and CA by which the former will pay 10% from the Australian players' IPL salary to CA. Paul Marsh, chief executive of ACA at-the-time stated that their players would oppose this decision by not signing CA, IPL contracts.

== Current administration ==
As of September 2026, Christina Matthews is the president of the Australian Cricketers' Association . Paul Marsh—who has previously been CEO of the AFL Players Association—became the CEO of the organisation in 2025. The chairman is Greg Healy, and the remaining members of the Board of Directors are Moises Henriques, Usman Khawaja, Beth Mooney, Lisa Sthalekar, Janet Torney, Darren Tucker and Ashton Turner.

=== Player delegates ===
The Australian Cricketers' Association have three types of player delegates to represent Australian professional cricket—state delegates, who represent players in the Sheffield Shield, One-Day Cup and Women's National Cricket League and "W/BBL delegates", who represent players in the Big Bash League and Women's Big Bash League. As of September 2026, this is the full list of ACA's player delegates.

List of player delegates
Player	Form/s	Team/s
Josh Philippe	State, BBL	New South Wales, Sydney Sixers
Kurtis Patterson	State	New South Wales
Hannah Darlington	State, WBBL	New South Wales Breakers, Sydney Thunder
Lauren Cheatle	State, WBBL	New South Wales Breakers, Sydney Sixers
Jack Sinfield	State	Queensland
Matt Renshaw	State	Queensland
Charli Knott	State	Queensland Fire
Grace Parsons	State	Queensland Fire
Harry Nielsen	State	South Australia
Jason Sangha	State	South Australia
Bridget Patterson	State, WBBL	South Australia, Adelaide Strikers
Kate Peterson	State	South Australia
Campbell Kellaway	State	Victoria
Todd Murphy	State	Victoria
Olivia Henry	State	Victoria
Georgia Prestwidge	State, WBBL	Victoria, Melbourne Stars
Liam Haskett	State	Western Australia
Cameron Bancroft	State	Western Australia
Mikayla Hinkley	State	Western Australia
Mathilda Carmichael	State	Western Australia
Charlie Wakim	State	Tasmania
Iain Carlisle	State	Tasmania
Jordan Silk	State	Tasmania
Hayley Silver-Holmes	State	Tasmania Tigers
Naomi Stalenberg	State	Tasmania Tigers
Rachel Trenaman	State, WBBL	Tasmania Tigers, Hobart Hurricanes
Annie Wikman	State	ACT Meteors
Olivia Porter	State	ACT Meteors
Alex Carey	BBL	Adelaide Strikers, Australia
Jimmy Peirson	BBL	Brisbane Heat
Georgia Redmayne	WBBL	Brisbane Heat
Mac Wright	BBL	Hobart Hurricanes
Will Sutherland	BBL	Melbourne Renegades
Courtney Webb	WBBL	Melbourne Renegades
Hilton Cartwright	BBL	Melbourne Stars
Alana King	WBBL	Perth Scorchers
Chris Green	BBL	Sydney Thunder
