= 2025–26 Dean Jones Trophy =

Cricket tournament

- Dates: 16 September 2025 – 11 March 2026
- Administrator: Cricket Australia
- Cricket format: List A
- Tournament format: Round-robin tournament
- Host(s): Adelaide; Brisbane; Hobart; Melbourne; Perth; Sydney
- Champions: New South Wales (13th title)
- Participants: 6
- Matches: 22
- Most runs: Kurtis Patterson (NSW) (565)
- Most wickets: Tanveer Sangha (NSW) (19)
- Official website: One-Day Cup

The 2025–26 Dean Jones Trophy (also known as One-Day Cup) was the 57th season of the official List A domestic cricket competition played in Australia. The tournament took place from 16 September 2025 to 11 March 2026 and was won by New South Wales.

== Points table ==
Pos	Team	Pld	W	L	T	NR	BP	Ded	Pts	NRR
1	Tasmania	7	5	2	0	0	2	0	22	0.330
2	New South Wales	7	4	3	0	0	3	0	19	0.765
3	Queensland	7	4	3	0	0	2	0	18	0.607
4	Western Australia	7	4	3	0	0	2	0.5	17.5	0.127
5	South Australia	7	2	5	0	0	2	0	10	−0.911
6	Victoria	7	2	5	0	0	0	0	8	−0.916

Source: ESPNcricinfo
- Qualified to the final

Point system:

- Win – 4
- Tie – 2 each
- No Result – 2 each
- Loss – 0
- Bonus Point – 1 (run rate 1.25 times that of opposition)

== Fixtures ==
16 September 2025
09:30
Scorecard

(H) New South Wales; 224 (49.4 overs)	v	Tasmania; 8/225 (49.2 overs)
Kurtis Patterson 110 (125); Nathan Ellis 3/37 (10 overs)		Matthew Kuhnemann 56* (71); Tanveer Sangha 2/34 (10 overs)

Tasmania won by 2 wickets
Cricket Central, Sydney
Umpires: Mitch Claydon and Shawn Craig
Player of the match: Kurtis Patterson (New South Wales)

- Tasmania won the toss and elected to field.
- Ryan Hadley and Blake Nikitaras (New South Wales) both made their List A debuts.
- Points: Tasmania 4, New South Wales 0

17 September 2025
09:30
Scorecard

(H) Queensland; 5/310 (50 overs)	v	Victoria; 255 (46.2 overs)
Marnus Labuschagne 130 (118); Will Sutherland 2/60 (10 overs)		Glenn Maxwell 107 (82); Michael Neser 3/43 (10 overs)

Queensland won by 55 runs
Allan Border Field, Brisbane
Umpires: Donovan Koch (Aus) and Riki Wessels (Eng)
Player of the match: Marnus Labuschagne (Queensland)

- Victoria won the toss and elected to field.
- Hugh Weibgen (Queensland) and Callum Stow (Victoria) both made their List A debuts.
- Points: Queensland 4, Victoria 0

19 September 2025
14:00 (D/N)
Scorecard

Tasmania; 381 (49.3 overs)	v	Victoria (H); 272 (40.1 overs)
Matthew Wade 105 (68); Mitchell Perry 4/101 (9.3 overs)		Sam Harper 88 (51); Mitchell Owen 4/57 (6.5 overs)

Tasmania won by 109 runs
Allan Border Field, Brisbane
Umpires: Andrew Crozier and Donovan Koch
Player of the match: Mitchell Owen (Tasmania)

- Victoria won the toss and elected to field.
- Points: Tasmania 5, Victoria 0

20 September 2025
09:30
Scorecard

(H) New South Wales; 7/288 (50 overs)	v	South Australia; 157 (36.3 overs)
Matthew Gilkes 99 (107); Wes Agar 2/44 (10 overs)		Mackenzie Harvey 60 (55); Chris Green 4/25 (10 overs)

New South Wales won by 131 runs
Cricket Central, Sydney
Umpires: Shawn Craig and Roberto Howard
Player of the match: Chris Green (New South Wales)

- South Australia won the toss and elected to field.
- Points: New South Wales 5, South Australia 0

21 September 2025
14:00 (D/N)
Scorecard

Western Australia; 9/321 (50 overs)	v	Queensland (H); 8/323 (49.1 overs)
Joel Curtis 116 (108); Mitchell Swepson 4/52 (10 overs)		Hugh Weibgen 115* (94); Joel Paris 3/40 (10 overs)

Queensland won by 2 wickets
Allan Border Field, Brisbane
Umpires: Andrew Crozier and Stephen Dionysius
Player of the match: Hugh Weibgen (Queensland)

- Western Australia won the toss and elected to bat.
- Joel Curtis (Western Australia) and Hugh Weibgen (Queensland) both scored their first centuries in List A cricket.
- Points: Queensland 4, Western Australia 0

24 September 2025
10:00
Scorecard

Western Australia; 9/298 (50 overs)	v	South Australia (H); 232 (44.3 overs)
Sam Fanning 75 (91); Jordan Buckingham 2/33 (10 overs)		Mackenzie Harvey 76 (65); Joel Paris 5/42 (9.3 overs)

Western Australia won by 66 runs
Karen Rolton Oval, Adelaide
Umpires: Phillip Gillespie and Chris Grant
Player of the match: Joel Paris (Western Australia)

- South Australia won the toss and elected to field.
- Hanno Jacobs (South Australia) and Albert Esterhuysen (Western Australia) both made their List A debuts.
- Joel Paris (Western Australia) took his maiden five-wicket haul in List A cricket.
- Points: Western Australia 5, South Australia 0

9 October 2025
10:00
Scorecard

(H) Queensland; 311 (45.3 overs)	v	Tasmania; 5/317 (48.2 overs)
Marnus Labuschagne 105 (91); Nikhil Chaudhary 3/66 (9.3 overs)		Tim Ward 105 (96); Jack Wildermuth 2/42 (6 overs)

Tasmania won by 5 wickets
Allan Border Field, Brisbane
Umpires: Sam Nogajski and Troy Penman
Player of the match: Tim Ward (Tasmania)

- Tasmania won the toss and elected to field.
- Tim Ward (Tasmania) scored his maiden century in List A cricket.
- Points: Tasmania 4, Queensland 0

9 October 2025
11:00
Scorecard

(H) South Australia; 8/273 (50 overs)	v	Victoria; 194 (44.1 overs)
Jake Lehmann 85 (95); Xavier Crone 4/61 (10 overs)		Sam Harper 59 (68); Nathan McAndrew 5/23 (8.1 overs)

South Australia won by 79 runs
Adelaide Oval, Adelaide
Umpires: Donovan Koch and Ben Treloar
Player of the match: Nathan McAndrew (South Australia)

- Victoria won the toss and elected to field.
- Austin Anlezark (Victoria) made his List A debut.
- Points: South Australia 5, Victoria 0

9 October 2025
14:00 (D/N)
Scorecard

New South Wales; 331 (50 overs)	v	Western Australia (H); 244 (46.5 overs)
Kurtis Patterson 66 (71); Mahli Beardman 3/48 (9 overs)		Sam Whiteman 52 (56); Sean Abbott 3/28 (8 overs)

New South Wales won by 87 runs
WACA Ground, Perth
Umpires: Gerard Abood and Michael Graham-Smith
Player of the match: Sean Abbott (New South Wales)

- Western Australia won the toss and elected to field.
- Points: New South Wales 5, Western Australia -0.5

20 October 2025
10:00
Scorecard

(H) Victoria; 8/183 (36 overs)	v	New South Wales; 178 (35.2 overs)
Will Sutherland 46 (44); Charlie Stobo 3/32 (7 overs)		Charlie Stobo 47 (41); Sam Elliott 2/15 (5.2 overs)

Victoria won by 5 runs
Junction Oval, Melbourne
Umpires: Stephen Dionysius and Troy Penman
Player of the match: Campbell Kellaway (Victoria)

- New South Wales won the toss and elected to field.
- The match was reduced to 36 overs per side due to rain.
- Points: Victoria 4, New South Wales 0

20 October 2025
10:30
Scorecard

Western Australia; 9/248 (44 overs)	v	Tasmania (H); 6/252 (37.5 overs)
Sam Fanning 66 (91); Bradley Hope 3/40 (7 overs)		Jordan Silk 81 (75); Mahli Beardman 2/55 (7 overs)

Tasmania won by 4 wickets (DLS method)
Bellerive Oval, Hobart
Umpires: Michael Graham-Smith and Roberto Howard
Player of the match: Jordan Silk (Tasmania)

- Western Australia won the toss and elected to bat.
- The match was reduced to 44 overs per side due to rain.
- Tasmania were set a revised target of 252 runs.
- Teague Wyllie (Western Australia) made his List A debut.
- Points: Tasmania 4, Western Australia 0

20 October 2025
11:00
Scorecard

Queensland; 128 (23.5 overs)	v	South Australia (H); 1/122 (17.1 overs)
Jimmy Peirson 42 (38); Nathan McSweeney 3/12 (3.1 overs)		Mackenzie Harvey 52* (52); James Bazley 1/18 (4 overs)

South Aust won by 9 wickets (DLS method)
Karen Rolton Oval, Adelaide
Umpires: Daryl Brigham and Ben Treloar
Player of the match: Nathan McSweeney (South Australia)

- South Australia won the toss and elected to field.
- The match was reduced to 25 overs per side due to rain.
- South Australia were set a revised target of 120 runs.
- Benji Floros (Queensland) made his List A debut.
- Points: South Australia 5, Queensland 0

3 November 2025
10:00
Scorecard

Queensland; 9/287 (50 overs)	v	New South Wales (H); 191 (42.1 overs)
Marnus Labuschagne 101 (111); Tanveer Sangha 3/64 (10 overs)		Lachlan Shaw 60 (64); Benji Floros 4/22 (7 overs)

Queensland won by 96 runs
Cricket Central, Sydney
Umpires: Sharad Patel and Ben Treloar
Player of the match: Marnus Labuschagne (Queensland)

- New South Wales won the toss and elected to field.
- Points: Queensland 5, New South Wales 0

15 November 2025
10:30
Scorecard

South Australia; 195 (46.2 overs)	v	Tasmania (H); 6/196 (39.4 overs)
Nathan McSweeney 49 (92); Billy Stanlake 3/31 (10 overs)		Beau Webster 78 (96); Nathan McAndrew 2/48 (10 overs)

Tasmania won by 4 wickets
Kingston Twin Ovals, Hobart
Umpires: Gerard Abood and Mitch Claydon
Player of the match: Beau Webster (Tasmania)

- Tasmania won the toss and elected to field.
- Points: Tasmania 5, South Australia 0

2 December 2025
10:00
Scorecard

(H) Victoria; 285 (49.1 overs)	v	Western Australia; 3/289 (44.4 overs)
Sam Harper 54 (50); Joel Paris 4/62 (10 overs)		Ashton Turner 71* (61); Sam Elliott 1/36 (8 overs)

Western Australia won by 7 wickets
Junction Oval, Melbourne
Umpires: Daryl Brigham and Michael Graham-Smith
Player of the match: Ashton Turner (Western Australia)

- Western Australia won the toss and elected to field.
- Sam Elliott replaced Austin Anlezark as a concussion substitute for Victoria.
- Points: Western Australia 4, Victoria 0

3 February 2026
10:00
Scorecard

Queensland; 215 (49 overs)	v	Victoria (H); 3/216 (44.3 overs)
Jimmy Peirson 65 (92); Todd Murphy 3/29 (10 overs)		Peter Handscomb 90* (107); Michael Neser 1/18 (5 overs)

Victoria won by 7 wickets
Melbourne Cricket Ground, Melbourne
Umpires: Andrew Crozier and Claire Polosak
Player of the match: Peter Handscomb (Victoria)

- Victoria won the toss and elected to field.
- Thomas Balkin and Oliver Patterson (Queensland) both made their List A debuts.
- Points: Victoria 4, Queensland 0

10 February 2026
10:00
Scorecard

South Australia; 7/242 (50 overs)	v	New South Wales (H); 3/246 (44 overs)
Jason Sangha 57 (67); Charlie Stobo 3/36 (10 overs)		Kurtis Patterson 104* (110); Hanno Jacobs 1/37 (6 overs)

New South Wales won by 7 wickets
Cricket Central, Sydney
Umpires: Gerard Abood and Chris Grant
Player of the match: Kurtis Patterson (New South Wales)

- New South Wales won the toss and elected to field.
- Joel Davies (New South Wales) and Campbell Thompson (South Australia) both made their List A debuts.
- Points: New South Wales 4, South Australia 0

10 February 2026
14:00 (D/N)
Scorecard

Tasmania; 318 (50 overs)	v	Western Australia (H); 9/319 (48.4 overs)
Beau Webster 138 (122); Bryce Jackson 4/55 (10 overs)		Joel Curtis 75 (57); Aidan O'Connor 2/47 (9 overs)

Western Australia won by 1 wicket
WACA Ground, Perth
Umpires: Stephen Dionysius and Sharad Patel
Player of the match: Beau Webster (Tasmania)

- Western Australia won the toss and elected to field.
- Will Malajczuk (Western Australia) made his List A debut.
- Points: Western Australia 4, Tasmania 0

21 February 2026
10:00
Scorecard

(H) Queensland; 260 (49.2 overs)	v	South Australia; 135 (26.1 overs)
Marnus Labuschagne 126 (137); Lloyd Pope 3/53 (10 overs)		Mackenzie Harvey 72 (66); Mitchell Swepson 7/28 (7.1 overs)

Queensland won by 125 runs
The Gabba, Brisbane
Umpires: Roberto Howard and Troy Penman
Player of the match: Mitchell Swepson (Queensland)

- South Australia won the toss and elected to field.
- Mitchell Swepson (Queensland) took his maiden five-wicket haul in List A cricket.
- Points: Queensland 5, South Australia 0

21 February 2026
14:00 (D/N)
Scorecard

(H) Tasmania; 274 (50 overs)	v	New South Wales; 3/275 (31 overs)
Charlie Wakim 76 (73); Ryan Hadley 5/69 (9 overs)		Kurtis Patterson 125* (89); Billy Stanlake 1/22 (2 overs)

New South Wales won by 7 wickets
Bellerive Oval, Hobart
Umpires: Gerard Abood and Sharad Patel
Player of the match: Kurtis Patterson (New South Wales)

- New South Wales won the toss and elected to field.
- Ryan Hadley (New South Wales) took his maiden five-wicket haul in List A cricket.
- Points: New South Wales 5, Tasmania 0

21 February 2026
14:00 (D/N)
Scorecard

Victoria; 9/230 (50 overs)	v	Western Australia (H); 2/232 (39.5 overs)
Campbell Kellaway 105 (117); Bryce Jackson 4/40 (10 overs)		Joel Curtis 91 (83); Mitchell Perry 1/22 (6 overs)

Western Australia won by 8 wickets
WACA Ground, Perth
Umpires: Michael Graham-Smith and Riki Wessels
Player of the match: Joel Curtis (Western Australia)

- Western Australia won the toss and elected to field.
- Dylan Brasher (Victoria) made his List A debut.
- Points: Western Australia 5, Victoria 0

== Final ==
11 March 2026
14:05
Scorecard

(H) Tasmania; 118 (20.3 overs)	v	New South Wales; 6/119 (20.1 overs)
Nikhil Chaudhary 31 (24); Sean Abbott 3/25 (4 overs)		Kurtis Patterson 52* (57); Nathan Ellis 2/26 (5 overs)

New South Wales won by 4 wickets
Bellerive Oval, Hobart
Umpires: Phillip Gillespie and Sam Nogajski
Player of the match: Kurtis Patterson (New South Wales)

- New South Wales won the toss and elected to field.
- The match was reduced to 22 overs per side due to rain.

== Television coverage ==
Every match of the 2025–26 One-Day Cup was streamed live by Cricket Australia through their website and the CA Live app. Kayo Sports also streamed all 22 matches. Fox Cricket broadcast four matches, including the final.

== See also ==
- 2025–26 Sheffield Shield season
