= 2024–25 Big Bash League season =

14th edition of the Big Bash League

2024–25 Big Bash League
- Dates: 15 December 2024 – 27 January 2025
- Administrator: Cricket Australia
- Cricket format: Twenty20
- Tournament format(s): Group stage and playoffs
- Champions: Hobart Hurricanes (1st title)
- Runners-up: Sydney Thunder
- Participants: 8
- Matches: 44
- Attendance: 942,958 (21,431 per match)
- Player of the series: Cooper Connolly (Perth Scorchers) & Glenn Maxwell (Melbourne Stars)
- Most runs: Mitchell Owen (452) (Hobart Hurricanes)
- Most wickets: Jason Behrendorff (17) (Perth Scorchers)
- Official website: Big Bash League

The 2024–25 Big Bash League season or BBL|14 was the fourteenth edition of the Big Bash League (BBL), the professional men's Twenty20 domestic cricket competition in Australia. The tournament was played from 15 December 2024, with the final held on 27 January 2025, where the Hobart Hurricanes defeated the Sydney Thunder by seven wickets to win their maiden BBL title. Brisbane Heat were the defending champions but failed to qualify from the league stage.

== Background ==
On 10 July 2024, it was announced that Big Bash League would return for a fourteenth season in 2024, being held from 15 December 2024, with the final scheduled to be held on 27 January 2025. The 2025 season clashed with the New Zealand Super Smash, Bangladesh Premier League, SA20 and International League T20.

== Draft ==
The 2024–25 season players draft was held on 1 September 2024.

Table of international draft selections
Club	Round	Pick	Player	National team	Notes
Adelaide Strikers	1	5	Jamie Overton	England	
Adelaide Strikers	2	11	Ollie Pope	England	Pre-signed player
Adelaide Strikers	3	20	Fabian Allen	West Indies	
Adelaide Strikers	4	29	Passed		
Brisbane Heat	1	6	Colin Munro	New Zealand	Pre-signed player
Brisbane Heat	2	14	Paul Walter	England	
Brisbane Heat	3	19	Passed		
Brisbane Heat	4	30	Tom Alsop	England	
Hobart Hurricanes	1	4	Shai Hope	West Indies	
Hobart Hurricanes	2	12	Chris Jordan	England	Pre-signed player
Hobart Hurricanes	3	21	Passed		
Hobart Hurricanes	4	28	Rishad Hossain	Bangladesh	Withdrew
Melbourne Renegades	1	2	Laurie Evans	England	
Melbourne Renegades	2	10	Jacob Bethell	England	
Melbourne Renegades	3	23	Tim Seifert	New Zealand	Pre-signed player
Melbourne Renegades	4	26	Passed		
Melbourne Stars	1	1	Ben Duckett	England	
Melbourne Stars	2	9	Tom Curran	England	Pre-signed player
Melbourne Stars	3	24	Usama Mir	Pakistan	
Melbourne Stars	4	25	Passed		
Perth Scorchers	1	7	Finn Allen	New Zealand	Pre-signed player
Perth Scorchers	2	15	Passed		
Perth Scorchers	3	18	Matthew Hurst	England	
Perth Scorchers	4	31	Keaton Jennings	England	
Sydney Sixers	1	8	James Vince	England	Retention Pick
Sydney Sixers	2	16	Akeal Hosein	West Indies	Pre-signed player
Sydney Sixers	3	17	Passed		
Sydney Sixers	4	32	Jafer Chohan	England	
Sydney Thunder	1	3	Lockie Ferguson	New Zealand	
Sydney Thunder	2	13	Sam Billings	England	Pre-signed player
Sydney Thunder	3	22	Sherfane Rutherford	West Indies	
Sydney Thunder	4	27	Passed		

== Squads ==
Unless otherwise specified, all players are Australian.

Adelaide Strikers	Brisbane Heat	Hobart Hurricanes	Melbourne Renegades
Fabian Allen (WIN); James Bazley; Cameron Boyce; Jordan Buckingham; Alex Carey; Brendan Doggett; Liam Haskett (Note: Local replacement player); Travis Head; Thomas Kelly; Chris Lynn; Harry Manenti (ITA); Harry Nielsen; Jamie Overton (ENG); Lloyd Pope; Ollie Pope (ENG); Alex Ross; Liam Scott; D'Arcy Short; Matthew Short (cap); Henry Thornton; Jake Weatherald	Tom Alsop (ENG); Tom Banton (ENG) (Note: International replacement player); Xavier Bartlett; Max Bryant; Daniel Drew; Spencer Johnson; Usman Khawaja (cap); Matthew Kuhnemann; Marnus Labuschagne; Nathan McSweeney; Colin Munro (NZ); Michael Neser; Jimmy Peirson; Will Prestwidge; Matthew Renshaw; Tom Straker; Mitchell Swepson; Callum Vidler; Paul Walter (ENG); Tom Whitney; Jack Wildermuth; Jack Wood	Marcus Bean; Iain Carlisle; Nikhil Chaudhary; Tim David; Paddy Dooley; Jake Doran; Nathan Ellis (cap); Peter Hatzoglou; Shai Hope (WIN); ~~Rishad Hossain~~ (BAN) (Note: Withdrew from the tournament); Caleb Jewell; Chris Jordan (ENG); Ben McDermott; Riley Meredith; Mitch Owen; Waqar Salamkheil (AFG); Billy Stanlake; Matthew Wade; Charlie Wakim; Mac Wright	Jacob Bethell (ENG); Josh Brown; Xavier Crone; Harry Dixon; Laurie Evans (ENG); Jake Fraser-McGurk; Marcus Harris; Mackenzie Harvey; Hassan Khan (USA); Nathan Lyon; Fergus O'Neill; Kane Richardson; Tom Rogers; Gurinder Sandhu; Tim Seifert (NZ); Callum Stow; Will Sutherland (cap); Jon Wells; Adam Zampa
Melbourne Stars	Perth Scorchers	Sydney Sixers	Sydney Thunder
Austin Anlezark; Scott Boland; Hilton Cartwright; Joe Clarke (ENG); Brody Couch; Tom Curran (ENG); Ben Duckett (ENG); Sam Harper; Campbell Kellaway; Blake Macdonald; Glenn Maxwell; Hamish McKenzie; Jonathan Merlo; Adam Milne; Usama Mir (PAK); Joel Paris; Tom Rogers; Peter Siddle; Mark Steketee; Marcus Stoinis (cap); Doug Warren; Beau Webster	Ashton Agar; Finn Allen (NZ); Mahli Beardman; Jason Behrendorff; Cooper Connolly; Sam Fanning; Aaron Hardie; Nick Hobson; Matthew Hurst (ENG); Josh Inglis; Bryce Jackson; Keaton Jennings (ENG); Matt Kelly; Mitchell Marsh; Lance Morris; Jhye Richardson; Matthew Spoors; Ashton Turner (cap); Andrew Tye	Sean Abbott; Jackson Bird; Jafer Chohan (ENG); Joel Davies; Ben Dwarshuis; Jack Edwards; Josh Hazlewood (Note: Supplementary player); Moises Henriques (cap); Akeal Hosein (WIN); Daniel Hughes; Hayden Kerr; Ben Manenti (ITA); Todd Murphy; Kurtis Patterson; Mitchell Perry; Josh Philippe; Lachlan Shaw; Jordan Silk; Steve Smith; Mitchell Starc; James Vince (ENG)	Tom Andrews; Wes Agar; Cameron Bancroft; Sam Billings (ENG); Pat Cummins; Ollie Davies; Lockie Ferguson (NZ); Matthew Gilkes; Chris Green; Ryan Hadley; Liam Hatcher; Sam Konstas; Nic Maddinson; Nathan McAndrew; Blake Nikitaras; Sherfane Rutherford; Will Salzmann; Daniel Sams; Jason Sangha; Tanveer Sangha; Hugh Weibgen; David Warner (cap)

== Venues ==
Adelaide	Brisbane	Canberra	Coffs Harbour
Adelaide Oval	The Gabba	Manuka Oval	C.ex Coffs International Stadium
Capacity: 53,500	Capacity: 36,000	Capacity: 13,500	Capacity: 10,000
Matches: 5	Matches: 5	Matches: 2	Matches: 1
Team: Adelaide Strikers	Team: Brisbane Heat	Teams: Melbourne Stars, Sydney Thunder	Team: Sydney Sixers
Geelong	2024–25 Big Bash League season is located in Australia		
GMHBA Stadium	2024–25 Big Bash League season is located in Australia		
Capacity: 40,000	2024–25 Big Bash League season is located in Australia		
Matches: 1	2024–25 Big Bash League season is located in Australia		
Team: Melbourne Renegades	2024–25 Big Bash League season is located in Australia		
Hobart	2024–25 Big Bash League season is located in Australia		Perth
Ninja Stadium	2024–25 Big Bash League season is located in Australia		Optus Stadium
Capacity: 19,500	2024–25 Big Bash League season is located in Australia		Capacity: 60,000
Matches: 5	2024–25 Big Bash League season is located in Australia		Matches: 5
Team: Hobart Hurricanes	2024–25 Big Bash League season is located in Australia		Team: Perth Scorchers
Melbourne		Sydney	
Marvel Stadium	Melbourne Cricket Ground	ENGIE Stadium	Sydney Cricket Ground
Capacity: 48,000	Capacity: 100,000	Capacity: 23,500	Capacity: 48,000
Matches: 4	Matches: 4	Matches: 4	Matches: 4
Team: Melbourne Renegades	Team: Melbourne Stars	Team: Sydney Thunder	Team: Sydney Sixers

== Standings ==
=== Points table ===
Pos	Team	Pld	W	L	NR	Pts	NRR	Qualification
1	Hobart Hurricanes (C)	10	7	2	1	15	−0.120	Advanced to the Qualifier
2	Sydney Sixers	10	6	2	2	14	0.156	Advanced to the Qualifier
3	Sydney Thunder (R)	10	5	3	2	12	0.340	Advanced to the Knockout
4	Melbourne Stars	10	5	5	0	10	0.135	Advanced to the Knockout
5	Perth Scorchers	10	4	6	0	8	0.219	
6	Melbourne Renegades	10	4	6	0	8	0.139	
7	Brisbane Heat	10	3	6	1	7	−0.831	
8	Adelaide Strikers	10	3	7	0	6	−0.122	

Source: ESPNcricinfo
(C) Champions; (R) Runners-up

=== Win–loss table ===
Below is a summary of results for each team's ten regular season matches, plus finals where applicable, in chronological order. A team's opponent for any given match is listed above the margin of victory/defeat.

Team	League stage										Play-offs				Pos.
Team	1	2	3	4	5	6	7	8	9	10	Q	K	C	F	Pos.
Adelaide; Strikers (ADS)	SYT; 2 wickets	MLS; 15 runs	BRH; 3 wickets	HBH; 11 runs	PRS; 7 wickets	MLR; 5 wickets	HBH; 5 wickets	BRH; 56 runs	SYS; 3 wickets	PRS; 5 wickets	X	X	X	X	8th
Brisbane; Heat (BRH)	MLS; 8 wickets	ADS; 2 wickets	PRS; 33 runs	SYS; 8 wickets	MLS; 5 wickets	SYS; N/R	SYT; 5 wickets	ADS; 56 runs	HBH; 5 wickets	MLR; 3 wickets	X	X	X	X	7th
Hobart; Hurricanes (HBH)	MLR; 6 wickets	PRS; 8 wickets	ADS; 11 runs	SYS; 50 runs	ADS; 5 wickets	SYT; N/R	SYT; 6 wickets	MLR; 4 wickets	BRH; 5 wickets	MLS; 40 runs	SYS; 12 runs	→	→	SYT; 7 wickets	1st (C)
Melbourne; Renegades (MLR)	SYS; 5 wickets	HBH; 6 wickets	PRS; 2 wickets	SYT; 8 runs	ADS; 5 wickets	MLS; 5 wickets	PRS; 4 wickets	MLS; 42 runs	HBH; 4 wickets	BRH; 3 wickets	X	X	X	X	6th
Melbourne; Stars (MLS)	PRS; 6 wickets	BRH; 8 wickets	ADS; 15 runs	SYS; 8 wickets	SYT; 18 runs	BRH; 5 wickets	MLR; 5 wickets	SYS; 16 runs	MLR; 42 runs	HBH; 40 runs	→	SYT; 21 runs (DLS)	X	X	4th (KO)
Perth; Scorchers (PRS)	MLS; 6 wickets	HBH; 8 wickets	MLR; 2 wickets	BRH; 33 runs	ADS; 7 wickets	SYT; 4 wickets	MLR; 4 wickets	SYS; 14 runs	SYT; 61 runs	ADS; 5 wickets	X	X	X	X	5th
Sydney; Sixers (SYS)	MLR; 5 wickets	SYT; 5 wickets	MLS; 8 wickets	BRH; 8 wickets	HBH; 50 runs	BRH; N/R	MLS; 16 runs	PRS; 14 runs	ADS; 3 wickets	SYT; N/R	HBH; 12 runs	→	SYT; 4 wickets	X	2nd (CF)
Sydney; Thunder (SYT)	ADS; 2 wickets	SYS; 5 wickets	MLS; 18 runs	MLR; 8 runs	PRS; 4 wickets	BRH; 5 wickets	HBH; N/R	HBH; 6 wickets	PRS; 61 runs	SYS; N/R	→	MLS; 21 runs (DLS)	SYS; 4 wickets	HBH; 7 wickets	3rd (RU)

Team's results→	Won	Lost	N/R

=== Match summary ===
Team	Group matches										Playoffs		
Team	1	2	3	4	5	6	7	8	9	10	Q/K	C	F
Adelaide Strikers	0	2	2	2	2	4	4	6	6	6			
Brisbane Heat	2	4	4	4	4	5	7	7	7	7			
Hobart Hurricanes	0	2	4	6	8	9	11	13	15	15	W		W
Melbourne Renegades	0	2	4	4	4	4	6	6	6	8			
Melbourne Stars	0	0	0	0	0	2	4	6	8	10	L		
Perth Scorchers	2	2	2	4	6	6	6	6	6	8			
Sydney Sixers	2	4	6	8	8	9	9	11	13	14	L	L	
Sydney Thunder	2	2	4	6	8	8	9	9	11	12	W	W	L

Win	Loss	No result

- Note: The total points at the end of each group match are listed.
- Note: Click on the points (group matches) or W/L (playoffs) to see the match summary.

Visitor team →	ADS	BRH	HBH	MLR	MLS	PRS	SYS	SYT
Home team ↓	ADS	BRH	HBH	MLR	MLS	PRS	SYS	SYT
Adelaide Strikers		Strikers; 56 runs	Hurricanes; 11 runs		Strikers; 15 runs	Scorchers; 7 wickets	Sixers; 3 wickets	
Brisbane Heat	Heat; 3 wickets		Hurricanes; 5 wickets		Stars; 5 wickets		Sixers; 8 wickets	Heat; 5 wickets
Hobart Hurricanes	Hurricanes; 5 wickets			Hurricanes; 4 wickets		Hurricanes; 8 wickets	Hurricanes; 50 runs	Hurricanes; 6 wickets
Melbourne Renegades	Strikers; 5 wickets	Renegades; 3 wickets	Renegades; 6 wickets		Stars; 42 runs	Renegades; 2 wickets		
Melbourne Stars		Heat; 8 wickets	Stars; 40 runs	Stars; 5 wickets			Stars; 16 runs	Thunder; 18 runs
Perth Scorchers	Scorchers; 5 wickets	Scorchers; 33 runs		Renegades; 4 wickets	Scorchers; 6 wickets			Thunder; 4 wickets
Sydney Sixers		Match abandoned		Sixers; 5 wickets	Sixers; 8 wickets	Sixers; 14 runs		Match abandoned
Sydney Thunder	Thunder; 2 wickets		Match abandoned	Thunder; 8 runs		Thunder; 61 runs	Sixers; 5 wickets	

Home team won	Visitor team won

- Note: Results listed are according to the home (horizontal) and visitor (vertical) teams.
- Note: Click on a result to see a summary of the match.

== League stage ==
On 12 July 2024, Cricket Australia confirmed the full schedule for the tournament.

Match 1
15 December 2024
19:15 (D/N)
Scorecard

Melbourne Stars; 9/146 (20 overs)	v	Perth Scorchers; 4/150 (17.1 overs)
Tom Curran 37 (19); Jhye Richardson 3/19 (4 overs)		Cooper Connolly 64 (51); Tom Curran 1/25 (4 overs)

Perth Scorchers won by 6 wickets
Optus Stadium, Perth
Attendance: 30,469
Umpires: Gerard Abood and Shawn Craig
Player of the match: Jhye Richardson (Perth Scorchers)

- Melbourne Stars won the toss and elected to bat.

Match 2
16 December 2024
19:15 (D/N)
Scorecard

Melbourne Renegades; 7/169 (20 overs)	v	Sydney Sixers; 5/172 (18.3 overs)
Tim Seifert 55 (42); Sean Abbott 2/34 (4 overs)		Moises Henriques 53* (27); Will Sutherland 2/20 (2.3 overs)

Sydney Sixers won by 5 wickets
Sydney Cricket Ground, Sydney
Attendance: 15,217
Umpires: Phillip Gillespie and Sam Nogajski
Player of the match: Moises Henriques (Sydney Sixers)

- Sydney Sixers won the toss and elected to field.

Match 3
17 December 2024
19:15 (N)
Scorecard

Adelaide Strikers; 8/182 (20 overs)	v	Sydney Thunder; 8/183 (19.4 overs)
Jamie Overton 45* (35); Lockie Ferguson 3/24 (4 overs)		Sam Konstas 56 (27); Jamie Overton 2/28 (3.4 overs)

Sydney Thunder won by 2 wickets
Manuka Oval, Canberra
Attendance: 8,021
Umpires: Simon Lightbody and Michael Graham-Smith
Player of the match: Daniel Sams (Sydney Thunder)

- Sydney Thunder won the toss and elected to field.
- Sam Konstas (Sydney Thunder) made his T20 debut.
- Sam Konstas made the fastest fifty for Sydney Thunder in tournament history.

Match 4
18 December 2024
19:15 (N)
Scorecard

Melbourne Stars; 6/162 (20 overs)	v	Brisbane Heat; 2/163 (18.1 overs)
Sam Harper 46 (36); Xavier Bartlett 3/25 (4 overs)		Jimmy Peirson 72* (56); Marcus Stoinis 1/20 (4 overs)

Brisbane Heat won by 8 wickets
Melbourne Cricket Ground, Melbourne
Attendance: 17,114
Umpires: Troy Penman and Benjamin Treloar
Player of the match: Jimmy Peirson (Brisbane Heat)

- Brisbane Heat won the toss and elected to field.
- Tom Whitney (Brisbane Heat) made his T20 debut.

Match 5
19 December 2024
19:15 (N)
Scorecard

Hobart Hurricanes; 74 (12.4 overs)	v	Melbourne Renegades; 4/78 (9 overs)
Nathan Ellis 35 (29); Will Sutherland 3/14 (3 overs)		Tim Seifert 37* (19); Nathan Ellis 2/12 (3 overs)

Melbourne Renegades won by 6 wickets
GMHBA Stadium, Geelong
Attendance: 13,221
Umpires: Phillip Gillespie and Claire Polosak
Player of the match: Tom Rogers (Melbourne Renegades)

- Melbourne Renegades won the toss and elected to field.
- Hobart Hurricanes registered their lowest-ever team total in tournament history.

Match 6
20 December 2024
19:15 (N)
Scorecard

Adelaide Strikers; 6/165 (20 overs)	v	Melbourne Stars; 9/150 (20 overs)
D'Arcy Short 60 (42); Peter Siddle 2/21 (4 overs)		Sam Harper 48 (44); Lloyd Pope 3/21 (4 overs)

Adelaide Strikers won by 15 runs
Adelaide Oval, Adelaide
Attendance: 23,654
Umpires: Gerard Abood and Michael Graham-Smith
Player of the match: Lloyd Pope (Adelaide Strikers)

- Melbourne Stars won the toss and elected to field.
- Doug Warren (Melbourne Stars) made his T20 debut.

Match 7
21 December 2024
16:00 (D/N)
Scorecard

Perth Scorchers; 6/155 (20 overs)	v	Hobart Hurricanes; 2/156 (19.2 overs)
Josh Inglis 49 (35); Riley Meredith 3/27 (4 overs)		Mitchell Owen 101* (64); Jason Behrendorff 2/21 (4 overs)

Hobart Hurricanes won by 8 wickets
Bellerive Oval, Hobart
Attendance: 7,561
Umpires: Simon Lightbody and Benjamin Treloar
Player of the match: Mitchell Owen (Hobart Hurricanes)

- Hobart Hurricanes won the toss and elected to field.
- Mitchell Owen (Hobart Hurricanes) scored his first century in T20s.

Match 8
21 December 2024
19:15 (N)
Scorecard

Sydney Thunder; 5/163 (20 overs)	v	Sydney Sixers; 5/164 (20 overs)
Cameron Bancroft 70* (52); Akeal Hosein 2/23 (4 overs)		Jordan Silk 36* (25); Lockie Ferguson 2/32 (4 overs)

Sydney Sixers won by 5 wickets
ENGIE Stadium, Sydney
Attendance: 17,547
Umpires: Shawn Craig and Gregory Davidson
Player of the match: Ben Dwarshuis (Sydney Sixers)

- Sydney Sixers won the toss and elected field.
- Lachlan Shaw (Sydney Sixers) made his T20 debut.

Match 9
22 December 2024
19:15 (N)
Scorecard

Adelaide Strikers; 6/174 (20 overs)	v	Brisbane Heat; 7/175 (20 overs)
Jamie Overton 45* (24); Will Prestwidge 2/16 (2 overs)		Nathan McSweeney 78* (49); Lloyd Pope 2/17 (3 overs)

Brisbane Heat won by 3 wickets
The Gabba, Brisbane
Attendance: 23,681
Umpires: Stephen Dionysius and Donovan Koch
Player of the match: Nathan McSweeney (Brisbane Heat)

- Brisbane Heat won the toss and elected to field.

Match 10
23 December 2024
19:15 (N)
Scorecard

Perth Scorchers; 8/143 (20 overs)	v	Melbourne Renegades; 8/144 (19 overs)
Cooper Connolly 66 (50); Tom Rogers 3/22 (4 overs)		Jacob Bethell 30 (22); Jason Behrendorff 2/33 (4 overs)

Melbourne Renegades won by 2 wickets
Marvel Stadium, Melbourne
Attendance: 18,014
Umpires: Shawn Craig and Gregory Davidson
Player of the match: Tom Rogers (Melbourne Renegades)

- Melbourne Renegades won the toss and elected to field.

Match 11
26 December 2024
18:05 (N)
Scorecard

Melbourne Stars; 9/194 (20 overs)	v	Sydney Sixers; 2/198 (18.1 overs)
Ben Duckett 68 (29); Jackson Bird 3/35 (3 overs)		James Vince 101* (58); Tom Curran 1/39 (3 overs)

Sydney Sixers won by 8 wickets
Sydney Cricket Ground, Sydney
Attendance: 23,212
Umpires: Gerard Abood and Michael Graham-Smith
Player of the match: James Vince (Sydney Sixers)

- Sydney Sixers won the toss and elected to field.

Match 12
26 December 2024
21:15 (N)
Scorecard

Perth Scorchers; 6/165 (20 overs)	v	Brisbane Heat; 132 (19.4 overs)
Nick Hobson 47* (16); Spencer Johnson 4/20 (4 overs)		Matt Renshaw 36 (24); Andrew Tye 2/23 (3.4 overs)

Perth Scorchers won by 33 runs
Optus Stadium, Perth
Attendance: 41,921
Umpires: Donovan Koch and Benjamin Treloar
Player of the match: Nick Hobson (Perth Scorchers)

- Brisbane Heat won the toss and elected to field.

Match 13
27 December 2024
19:15 (N)
Scorecard

Hobart Hurricanes; 5/214 (20 overs)	v	Adelaide Strikers; 6/203 (20 overs)
Ben McDermott 68* (34); Jamie Overton 2/27 (4 overs)		Matthew Short 52 (29); Chris Jordan 2/36 (4 overs)

Hobart Hurricanes won by 11 runs
Adelaide Oval, Adelaide
Attendance: 25,102
Umpires: Sam Nogajski and Sharad Patel
Player of the match: Ben McDermott (Hobart Hurricanes)

- Adelaide Strikers won the toss and elected to field.

Match 14
28 December 2024
19:15 (N)
Scorecard

Sydney Thunder; 8/182 (20 overs)	v	Melbourne Stars; 8/164 (20 overs)
Sam Billings 72 (39); Beau Webster 3/42 (4 overs)		Ben Duckett 67 (49); Wes Agar 3/25 (4 overs)

Sydney Thunder won by 18 runs
Manuka Oval, Canberra
Attendance: 10,249
Umpires: Roberto Howard and Michael Graham-Smith
Player of the match: Sam Billings (Sydney Thunder)

- Melbourne Stars won the toss and elected to field.

Match 15
29 December 2024
19:15 (N)
Scorecard

Brisbane Heat; 9/138 (20 overs)	v	Sydney Sixers; 2/142 (16.1 overs)
Nathan McSweeney 34 (29); Ben Dwarshuis 4/32 (4 overs)		Josh Philippe 66* (41); Xavier Bartlett 1/21 (3.1 overs)

Sydney Sixers won by 8 wickets
The Gabba, Brisbane
Attendance: 30,122
Umpires: Simon Lightbody and Phillip Gillespie
Player of the match: Ben Dwarshuis (Sydney Sixers)

- Sydney Sixers won the toss and elected to field.

Match 16
30 December 2024
19:15 (N)
Scorecard

Sydney Thunder; 4/156 (20 overs)	v	Melbourne Renegades; 8/148 (20 overs)
David Warner 86* (57); Kane Richardson 1/24 (4 overs)		Laurie Evans 40 (26); Wes Agar 4/32 (4 overs)

Sydney Thunder won by 8 runs
ENGIE Stadium, Sydney
Attendance: 12,919
Umpires: Gerard Abood and Troy Penman
Player of the match: David Warner (Sydney Thunder)

- Melbourne Renegades won the toss and elected to field.

Match 17
31 December 2024
19:15 (N)
Scorecard

Adelaide Strikers; 8/142 (20 overs)	v	Perth Scorchers; 3/146 (14.3 overs)
Brendan Doggett 47* (39); Jhye Richardson 3/29 (4 overs)		Finn Allen 50 (23); Henry Thornton 2/26 (3 overs)

Perth Scorchers won by 7 wickets
Adelaide Oval, Adelaide
Attendance: 41,624
Umpires: Phillip Gillespie and Sam Nogajski
Player of the match: Cooper Connolly (Perth Scorchers)

- Perth Scorchers won the toss and elected to field.

Match 18
1 January 2025
16:00 (D/N)
Scorecard

Hobart Hurricanes; 6/161 (20 overs)	v	Sydney Sixers; 111 (19.3 overs)
Nikhil Chaudhary 42 (31); Jackson Bird 4/16 (4 overs)		Moises Henriques 22 (19); Chris Jordan 3/22 (3.3 overs)

Hobart Hurricanes won by 50 runs
Bellerive Oval, Hobart
Attendance: 8,049
Umpires: Simon Lightbody and Michael Graham-Smith
Player of the match: Nikhil Chaudhary (Hobart Hurricanes)

- Sydney Sixers won the toss and elected to field.

Match 19
1 January 2025
19:15 (N)
Scorecard

Brisbane Heat; 7/149 (20 overs)	v	Melbourne Stars; 5/153 (19.1 overs)
Max Bryant 77* (48); Mark Steketee 2/42 (4 overs)		Dan Lawrence 64* (38); Xavier Bartlett 4/10 (4 overs)

Melbourne Stars won by 5 wickets
The Gabba, Brisbane
Attendance: 25,023
Umpires: Donovan Koch and Benjamin Treloar
Player of the match: Marcus Stoinis (Melbourne Stars)

- Melbourne Stars won the toss and elected to field.

Match 20
2 January 2025
19:15 (N)
Scorecard

Melbourne Renegades; 9/142 (20 overs)	v	Adelaide Strikers; 5/143 (17.1 overs)
Josh Brown 66 (41); Henry Thornton 3/22 (4 overs)		Chris Lynn 88 (51); Adam Zampa 2/29 (4 overs)

Adelaide Strikers won by 5 wickets
Marvel Stadium, Melbourne
Attendance: 18,297
Umpires: Shawn Craig and Eloise Sheridan
Player of the match: Chris Lynn (Adelaide Strikers)

- Adelaide Strikers won the toss and elected to field.

Match 21
3 January 2025
18:05 (N)
Scorecard

Brisbane Heat	v	Sydney Sixers

Match abandoned
Coffs Harbour International Stadium, Coffs Harbour
Attendance: –
Umpires: Troy Penman and Benjamin Treloar

- No toss.
- No play was possible due to rain.

Match 22
3 January 2025
21:15 (N)
Scorecard

Perth Scorchers; 4/177 (20 overs)	v	Sydney Thunder; 6/179 (20 overs)
Finn Allen 68 (31); Chris Green 3/20 (4 overs)		David Warner 49 (33); Lance Morris 3/22 (4 overs)

Sydney Thunder won by 4 wickets
Optus Stadium, Perth
Attendance: 46,471
Umpires: Michael Graham-Smith and David Taylor
Player of the match: Sherfane Rutherford (Sydney Thunder)

- Sydney Thunder won the toss and elected to field.
- Hugh Weibgen (Sydney Thunder) made his T20 debut.

Match 23
4 January 2025
19:15 (N)
Scorecard

Melbourne Renegades; 7/168 (20 overs)	v	Melbourne Stars; 5/171 (19.4 overs)
Jacob Bethell 49 (36); Joel Paris 2/23 (4 overs)		Ben Duckett 67 (49); Gurinder Sandhu 3/29 (4 overs)

Melbourne Stars win by 5 wickets
Melbourne Cricket Ground, Melbourne
Attendance: 40,636
Umpires: Shawn Craig and Donovan Koch
Player of the match: Ben Duckett (Melbourne Stars)

- Melbourne Stars won the toss and elected to field.

Match 24
5 January 2025
19:15 (N)
Scorecard

Adelaide Strikers; 5/186 (20 overs)	v	Hobart Hurricanes; 5/187 (18.4 overs)
Chris Lynn 49 (27); Waqar Salamkheil 2/22 (2 overs)		Tim David 62* (28); Cameron Boyce 2/23 (4 overs)

Hobart Hurricanes won by 5 wickets
Bellerive Oval, Hobart
Attendance: 5,331
Umpires: Sharad Patel and Ben Treloar
Player of the match: Tim David (Hobart Hurricanes)

- Adelaide Strikers won the toss and elected to bat.

Match 25
6 January 2025
19:15 (N)
Scorecard

Sydney Thunder; 8/173 (20 overs)	v	Brisbane Heat; 5/174 (18.5 overs)
David Warner 50 (36); Spencer Johnson 3/39 (4 overs)		Max Bryant 72 (35); Lockie Ferguson 2/21 (4 overs)

Brisbane Heat won by 5 wickets
The Gabba, Brisbane
Attendance: 23,309
Umpires: Eloise Sheridan and Andrew Crozier
Player of the match: Max Bryant (Brisbane Heat)

- Brisbane Heat won the toss and elected to field.

Match 26
7 January 2025
19:15 (D/N)
Scorecard

Perth Scorchers; 8/147 (20 overs)	v	Melbourne Renegades; 6/150 (19.4 overs)
Ashton Agar 51* (30); Adam Zampa 3/27 (4 overs)		Will Sutherland 70 (45); Lance Morris 2/21 (4 overs)

Melbourne Renegades won by 4 wickets
Optus Stadium, Perth
Attendance: 31,795
Umpires: Shawn Craig and Stephen Dionysius
Player of the match: Tom Rogers (Melbourne Renegades)

- Melbourne Renegades won the toss and elected to field.

Match 27
8 January 2025
19:15 (N)
Scorecard

Sydney Thunder	v	Hobart Hurricanes

Match abandoned
ENGIE Stadium, Sydney
Attendance: –
Umpires: Gerard Abood and Claire Polosak

- No toss.
- No play was possible due to rain.

Match 28
9 January 2025
19:15 (N)
Scorecard

Melbourne Stars; 5/156 (20 overs)	v	Sydney Sixers; 9/140 (20 overs)
Glenn Maxwell 58* (32); Sean Abbott 3/29 (4 overs)		James Vince 53 (44); Mark Steketee 3/14 (3 overs)

Melbourne Stars won by 16 runs
Melbourne Cricket Ground, Melbourne
Attendance: 21,645
Umpires: Donovan Koch and Simon Lightbody
Player of the match: Glenn Maxwell (Melbourne Stars)

- Sydney Sixers won the toss and elected to field.

Match 29
10 January 2025
19:15 (N)
Scorecard

Sydney Thunder; 6/164 (20 overs)	v	Hobart Hurricanes; 4/165 (16.5 overs)
David Warner 88* (66); Riley Meredith 2/30 (4 overs)		Tim David 68* (38); George Garton 2/31 (3 overs)

Hobart Hurricanes won by 6 wickets
Bellerive Oval, Hobart
Attendance: 7,859
Umpires: Michael Graham-Smith and Troy Penman
Player of the match: Tim David (Hobart Hurricanes)

- Hobart Hurricanes won the toss and elected to field.

Match 30
11 January 2025
16:45 (D/N)
Scorecard

Sydney Sixers; 3/220 (20 overs)	v	Perth Scorchers; 7/206 (20 overs)
Steve Smith 121* (64); Cooper Connolly 1/27 (3 overs)		Ashton Turner 66* (32); Sean Abbott 4/43 (4 overs)

Sydney Sixers won by 14 runs
Sydney Cricket Ground, Sydney
Attendance: 31,165
Umpires: Phillip Gillespie and Roberto Howard
Player of the match: Steve Smith (Sydney Sixers)

- Perth Scorchers won the toss and elected to field.

Match 31
11 January 2025
20:00 (N)
Scorecard

Adelaide Strikers; 5/251 (20 overs)	v	Brisbane Heat; 195 (20 overs)
Matthew Short 109 (54); Matthew Kuhnemann 3/50 (4 overs)		Nathan McSweeney 43 (24); D'Arcy Short 4/15 (3 overs)

Adelaide Strikers won by 56 runs
Adelaide Oval, Adelaide
Attendance: 27,212
Umpires: Sam Nogajski and Greg Davidson
Player of the match: Matthew Short (Adelaide Strikers)

- Brisbane Heat won the toss and elected to field.
- Jordan Buckingham and Liam Haskett (Adelaide Strikers) both made their T20 debuts.

Match 32
12 January 2025
19:15 (N)
Scorecard

Melbourne Stars; 165 (20 overs)	v	Melbourne Renegades; 123 (19.5 overs)
Glenn Maxwell 90 (52); Fergus O'Neill 2/16 (4 overs)		Tim Seifert 26 (26); Mark Steketee 5/17 (4 overs)

Melbourne Stars win by 42 runs
Marvel Stadium, Melbourne
Attendance: 38,031
Umpires: Gerard Abood and Ben Treloar
Player of the match: Glenn Maxwell (Melbourne Stars)

- Melbourne Renegades won the toss and elected to field.
- Harry Dixon (Melbourne Renegades) made his T20 debut.
- Mark Steketee (Melbourne Stars) took his first five-wicket haul in T20s.

Match 33
13 January 2025
19:30 (N)
Scorecard

Sydney Thunder; 7/158 (20 overs)	v	Perth Scorchers; 97 (17.2 overs)
Sam Konstas 53 (42); Lance Morris 3/43 (4 overs)		Aaron Hardie 22 (17); Chris Green 3/13 (4 overs)

Sydney Thunder won by 61 runs
ENGIE Stadium, Sydney
Attendance: 10,213
Umpires: Mike Graham-Smith and David Taylor
Player of the match: Tom Andrews (Sydney Thunder)

- Perth Scorchers won the toss and elected to field.
- Mahli Beardman (Perth Scorchers) made his T20 debut.

Match 34
14 January 2025
19:30 (N)
Scorecard

Melbourne Renegades; 7/154 (20 overs)	v	Hobart Hurricanes; 6/155 (19.4 overs)
Jacob Bethell 87 (50); Riley Meredith 3/36 (4 overs)		Matthew Wade 36 (23); Jacob Bethell 2/29 (3 overs)

Hobart Hurricanes won by 4 wickets
Bellerive Oval, Hobart
Attendance: 8,573
Umpires: Gerard Abood and Andrew Crozier
Player of the match: Jacob Bethell (Melbourne Renegades)

- Hobart Hurricanes won the toss and elected to field.
- Callum Stow (Melbourne Renegades) made his T20 debut.

Match 35
15 January 2025
19:30 (N)
Scorecard

Adelaide Strikers; 5/182 (20 overs)	v	Sydney Sixers; 7/183 (19.5 overs)
Ollie Pope 57 (39); Todd Murphy 2/2 (1 over)		Steve Smith 52 (31); Lloyd Pope 2/33 (4 overs)

Sydney Sixers won by 3 wickets
Adelaide Oval, Adelaide
Attendance: 25,373
Umpires: Donovan Koch and Simon Lightbody
Player of the match: Steve Smith (Sydney Sixers)

- Sydney Sixers won the toss and elected to field.

Match 36
16 January 2025
19:30 (N)
Scorecard

Brisbane Heat; 6/201 (20 overs)	v	Hobart Hurricanes; 5/207 (20 overs)
Marnus Labuschagne 77 (44); Nathan Ellis 3/42 (4 overs)		Caleb Jewell 76 (49); Spencer Johnson 3/26 (4 overs)

Hobart Hurricanes won by 5 wickets
The Gabba, Brisbane
Attendance: 30,833
Umpires: Shawn Craig and Steve Dionysius
Player of the match: Caleb Jewell (Hobart Hurricanes)

- Hobart Hurricanes won the toss and elected to field.
- Marcus Bean (Hobart Hurricanes) made his T20 debut.

Match 37
17 January 2025
19:15 (N)
Scorecard

Sydney Thunder; 1/36 (5.1 overs)	v	Sydney Sixers
David Warner 22* (14); Jack Edwards 1/5 (2 overs)

No result
Sydney Cricket Ground, Sydney
Attendance: 30,874
Umpires: Andrew Crozier and Sam Nogajski

- Sydney Sixers won the toss and elected to field.
- No further play was possible due to rain.

Match 38
18 January 2025
17:00 (D/N)
Scorecard

Brisbane Heat; 4/196 (20 overs)	v	Melbourne Renegades; 7/199 (18 overs)
Jack Wood 45 (27); Adam Zampa 2/29 (4 overs)		Jake Fraser-McGurk 95 (46); Paul Walter 2/23 (4 overs)

Melbourne Renegades won by 3 wickets
Marvel Stadium, Melbourne
Attendance: 20,077
Umpires: Donovan Koch and Ben Treloar
Player of the match: Jake Fraser-McGurk (Melbourne Renegades)

- Melbourne Renegades won the toss and elected to field.
- Oliver Peake (Melbourne Renegades) made his T20 debut.

Match 39
18 January 2025
20:15 (D/N)
Scorecard

Adelaide Strikers; 161 (19.1 overs)	v	Perth Scorchers; 5/163 (16.2 overs)
Liam Scott 67 (43); Mahli Beardman 3/17 (3 overs)		Cooper Connolly 39* (21); D'Arcy Short 2/37 (3.2 overs)

Perth Scorchers won by 5 wickets
Optus Stadium, Perth
Attendance: 41,878
Umpires: Greg Davidson and Mike Graham-Smith
Player of the match: Jason Behrendorff (Perth Scorchers)

- Perth Scorchers won the toss and elected to field.

Match 40
19 January 2025
19:15 (N)
Scorecard

Melbourne Stars; 5/219 (20 overs)	v	Hobart Hurricanes; 179 (19.3 overs)
Glenn Maxwell 76* (32); Nathan Ellis 1/3 (1 over)		Nathan Ellis 40 (22); Mark Steketee 4/24 (3.3 overs)

Melbourne Stars won by 40 runs
Melbourne Cricket Ground, Melbourne
Attendance: 32,360
Umpires: Shawn Craig and Sam Nogajski
Player of the match: Glenn Maxwell (Melbourne Stars)

- Hobart Hurricanes won the toss and elected to field.

== Play-offs ==
Qualifier
21 January 2025
1	Hobart Hurricanes	7/173 (20 overs)
2	Sydney Sixers	5/161 (20 overs)
Knockout
22 January 2025
3	Sydney Thunder	7/135 (19 overs)
4	Melbourne Stars	114 (18 overs)

Challenger
24 January 2025
2	Sydney Sixers	7/151 (20 overs)
3	Sydney Thunder	6/157 (18.5 overs)

Final
27 January 2025
1	Hobart Hurricanes	3/185 (14.1 overs)
3	Sydney Thunder	7/182 (20 overs)

=== Qualifier ===
Qualifier
21 January 2025
19:30 (N)
Scorecard

Hobart Hurricanes; 7/173 (20 overs)	v	Sydney Sixers; 5/161 (20 overs)
Ben McDermott 42 (31); Jafer Chohan 2/28 (4 overs)		Jordan Silk 57 (44); Cameron Gannon 2/10 (3 overs)

Hobart Hurricanes won by 12 runs
Ninja Stadium, Hobart
Attendance: 13,132
Umpires: Shawn Craig and Sam Nogajski
Player of the match: Riley Meredith (Hobart Hurricanes)

- Sydney Sixers won the toss and elected to field.

=== Knockout ===
Knockout
22 January 2025
19:30 (N)
Scorecard

Sydney Thunder; 7/135 (19 overs)	v	Melbourne Stars; 114 (18 overs)
Oliver Davies 36 (35); Tom Curran 2/26 (4 overs); Usama Mir 2/26 (4 overs)		Glenn Maxwell 28 (21); Nathan McAndrew 5/16 (4 overs)

Sydney Thunder won by 21 runs (DLS method)
Engie Stadium, Sydney
Attendance: 13,067
Umpires: Phillip Gillespie and Donovan Koch
Player of the match: Nathan McAndrew (Sydney Thunder)

- Melbourne Stars won the toss and elected to field.
- The match was reduced to 19 overs per side due to bad weather.
- Nathan McAndrew (Sydney Thunder) took his first five-wicket haul in T20s.

=== Challenger ===
Challenger
24 January 2025
19:15 (N)
Scorecard

Sydney Sixers; 7/151 (20 overs)	v	Sydney Thunder; 6/157 (18.5 overs)
Jordan Silk 43* (30); Tom Andrews 2/15 (2 overs)		Sam Billings 42* (29); Hayden Kerr 2/35 (4 overs)

Sydney Thunder won by 4 wickets
Sydney Cricket Ground, Sydney
Attendance: 32,107
Umpires: Donovan Koch and Sam Nogajski
Player of the match: Sam Billings (Sydney Thunder)

- Sydney Thunder won the toss and elected to field.

=== Final ===
Final
27 January 2025
19:15 (N)
Scorecard

Sydney Thunder; 7/182 (20 overs)	v	Hobart Hurricanes; 3/185 (14.1 overs)
Jason Sangha 67 (42); Nathan Ellis 3/23 (4 overs)		Mitchell Owen 108 (42); Tanveer Sangha 2/43 (4 overs)

Hobart Hurricanes won by 7 wickets
Ninja Stadium, Hobart
Attendance: 15,706
Umpires: Donovan Koch and Sam Nogajski
Player of the match: Mitchell Owen (Hobart Hurricanes)

- Hobart Hurricanes won the toss and elected to field.
- Mitchell Owen (Hobart Hurricanes) equaled the record for fastest century in the BBL.

== Team of the tournament ==
The team of the tournament was announced on 23 January.

- David Warner (captain), Sydney Thunder
- Mitchell Owen, Hobart Hurricanes
- Cooper Connolly, Perth Scorchers
- Marcus Stoinis, Melbourne Stars
- Sam Billings (wicket-keeper), Sydney Thunder
- Glenn Maxwell, Melbourne Stars
- Tim David, Hobart Hurricanes
- Ben Dwarshuis, Sydney Sixers
- Tom Rogers, Melbourne Renegades
- Jason Behrendorff, Perth Scorchers
- Lloyd Pope, Adelaide Strikers
- Jamie Overton (twelfth), Adelaide Strikers

== Season statistics ==
Highest team total
Score (overs)	Team	Opponent	Result	Venue	Date
5/251 (20.0)	Adelaide Strikers	Brisbane Heat	Won	Adelaide Oval, Adelaide	11 January 2025
3/220 (20.0)	Sydney Sixers	Perth Scorchers	Won	Sydney Cricket Ground, Sydney	11 January 2025
5/219 (20.0)	Melbourne Stars	Hobart Hurricanes	Won	Melbourne Cricket Ground, Melbourne	19 January 2025
5/214 (20.0)	Hobart Hurricanes	Adelaide Strikers	Won	Adelaide Oval, Adelaide	27 December 2024
5/207 (20.0)	Hobart Hurricanes	Brisbane Heat	Won	The Gabba, Brisbane	16 January 2025

- Source: ESPNcricinfo

Lowest team totals (completed matches)
Score (overs)	Team	Opponent	Venue	Date
74 (12.4)	Hobart Hurricanes	Melbourne Renegades	Simonds Stadium, Geelong	19 December 2024
97 (17.2)	Perth Scorchers	Sydney Thunder	Sydney Showground Stadium, Sydney	13 January 2025
111 (19.3)	Sydney Sixers	Hobart Hurricanes	Bellerive Oval, Hobart	1 January 2025
114 (18.0)	Melbourne Stars	Sydney Thunder	Sydney Showground Stadium, Sydney	22 January 2025
123 (19.5)	Melbourne Renegades	Melbourne Stars	Docklands Stadium, Melbourne	12 January 2025

- Source: ESPNcricinfo

Most individual runs
Runs	Player	Team
452	Mitchell Owen	Hobart Hurricanes
405	David Warner	Sydney Thunder
351	Cooper Connolly	Perth Scorchers
325	Glenn Maxwell	Melbourne Stars
311	Marcus Stoinis	Melbourne Stars

- Source: ESPNcricinfo

Highest individual score
Runs	Batsmen	Team	Opposition
121 not out	Steve Smith	Sydney Sixers	Perth Scorchers
109	Matthew Short	Adelaide Strikers	Brisbane Heat
108	Mitchell Owen	Hobart Hurricanes	Sydney Thunder
101 not out	Mitchell Owen	Hobart Hurricanes	Perth Scorchers
101 not out	James Vince	Sydney Sixers	Melbourne Stars

- Source: ESPNcricinfo

Most wickets
Wickets	Player	Team
17	Jason Behrendorff	Perth Scorchers
16	Tom Rogers	Melbourne Renegades
16	Riley Meredith	Hobart Hurricanes
15	Mark Steketee	Melbourne Stars
15	Lance Morris	Perth Scorchers
15	Lloyd Pope	Adelaide Strikers

- Source: ESPNcricinfo

== Attendance ==
Match attendances in chronological order
Match	Teams	Date	Venue	Location	Attendance	Capacity % (Note: Based on general venue capacity, which will vary depending on cricket capacity.)
1	Perth Scorchers vs Melbourne Stars	15 December 2024	Optus Stadium	Perth	30,469	50%
2	Sydney Sixers vs Melbourne Renegades	16 December 2024	Sydney Cricket Ground	Sydney	15,217	32%
3	Sydney Thunder vs Adelaide Strikers	17 December 2024	Manuka Oval	Canberra	8,021	59%
4	Brisbane Heat vs Melbourne Stars	18 December 2024	Melbourne Cricket Ground	Melbourne	17,114	17%
5	Melbourne Renegades vs Hobart Hurricanes	19 December 2024	GMHBA Stadium	Geelong	13,221	33%
6	Adelaide Strikers vs Melbourne Stars	20 December 2024	Adelaide Oval	Adelaide	23,654	44%
7	Hobart Hurricanes vs Perth Scorchers	21 December 2024	Ninja Stadium	Hobart	7,561	38%
8	Sydney Thunder vs Sydney Sixers	21 December 2024	ENGIE Stadium	Sydney	17,547	75%
9	Brisbane Heat vs Adelaide Strikers	22 December 2024	The Gabba	Brisbane	23,681	56%
10	Melbourne Renegades vs Perth Scorchers	23 December 2024	Marvel Stadium	Melbourne	18,014	34%
11	Sydney Sixers vs Melbourne Stars	26 December 2024	Sydney Cricket Ground	Sydney	23,212	48%
12	Perth Scorchers vs Brisbane Heat	26 December 2024	Optus Stadium	Perth	41,921	70%
13	Adelaide Strikers vs Hobart Hurricanes	27 December 2024	Adelaide Oval	Adelaide	25,102	47%
14	Melbourne Stars vs Sydney Thunder	28 December 2024	Manuka Oval	Canberra	10,249	76%
15	Brisbane Heat vs Sydney Sixers	29 December 2024	The Gabba	Brisbane	30,122	72%
16	Sydney Thunder vs Melbourne Renegades	30 December 2024	ENGIE Stadium	Sydney	12,919	55%
17	Adelaide Strikers vs Perth Scorchers	31 December 2024	Adelaide Oval	Adelaide	41,624	78%
18	Hobart Hurricanes vs Sydney Sixers	1 January 2025	Ninja Stadium	Hobart	8,049	40%
19	Brisbane Heat vs Melbourne Stars	1 January 2025	The Gabba	Brisbane	25,023	60%
20	Melbourne Renegades vs Adelaide Strikers	2 January 2025	Marvel Stadium	Melbourne	18,297	34%
21	Sydney Sixers vs Brisbane Heat	3 January 2025	Coffs Harbour International Stadium	Coffs Harbour	—N/a	—N/a
22	Perth Scorchers vs Sydney Thunder	3 January 2025	Optus Stadium	Perth	46,471	78%
23	Melbourne Stars vs Melbourne Renegades	4 January 2025	Melbourne Cricket Ground	Melbourne	40,636	41%
24	Hobart Hurricanes vs Adelaide Strikers	5 January 2025	Ninja Stadium	Hobart	5,331	27%
25	Brisbane Heat vs Sydney Thunder	6 January 2025	The Gabba	Brisbane	23,309	56%
26	Perth Scorchers vs Melbourne Renegades	7 January 2025	Optus Stadium	Perth	31,795	53%
27	Sydney Thunder vs Hobart Hurricanes	8 January 2025	ENGIE Stadium	Sydney	—N/a	—N/a
28	Melbourne Stars vs Sydney Sixers	9 January 2025	Melbourne Cricket Ground	Melbourne	21,645	22%
29	Hobart Hurricanes vs Sydney Thunder	10 January 2025	Ninja Stadium	Hobart	7,859	39%
30	Sydney Sixers vs Perth Scorchers	11 January 2025	Sydney Cricket Ground	Sydney	31,165	65%
31	Adelaide Strikers vs Brisbane Heat	11 January 2025	Adelaide Oval	Adelaide	27,212	51%
32	Melbourne Renegades vs Melbourne Stars	12 January 2025	Marvel Stadium	Melbourne	38,031	67%
33	Sydney Thunder vs Perth Scorchers	13 January 2025	ENGIE Stadium	Sydney	10,213	43%
34	Hobart Hurricanes vs Melbourne Renegades	14 January 2025	Ninja Stadium	Hobart	8,573	43%
35	Adelaide Strikers vs Sydney Sixers	15 January 2025	Adelaide Oval	Adelaide	25,373	47%
36	Brisbane Heat vs Hobart Hurricanes	16 January 2025	The Gabba	Brisbane	30,833	83%
37	Sydney Sixers vs Sydney Thunder	17 January 2025	Sydney Cricket Ground	Sydney	30,874	64%
38	Melbourne Renegades vs Brisbane Heat	18 January 2025	Marvel Stadium	Melbourne	20,077	36%
39	Perth Scorchers vs Adelaide Strikers	18 January 2025	Optus Stadium	Perth	41,878	68%
40	Melbourne Stars vs Hobart Hurricanes	19 January 2025	Melbourne Cricket Ground	Melbourne	32,360	32%
Qualifier	Hobart Hurricanes vs Sydney Sixers	20 January 2025	Ninja Stadium	Hobart	13,132	67%
Knockout	Sydney Thunder vs Melbourne Stars	21 January 2025	Engie Stadium	Sydney	13,067	56%
Challenger	Sydney Sixers vs Sydney Thunder	23 January 2025	Sydney Cricket Ground	Sydney	32,107	67%
Final	Hobart Hurricanes vs Sydney Thunder	27 January 2025	Ninja Stadium	Hobart	15,706	81%
Total					942,958	—
Average					21,929	—

As of 27 January 2025 - the final (Hobart Hurricanes vs Sydney Thunder)

=== Home team attendances ===
Home team attendances ranked in order of highest average.

Team	Venue/s	Match 1	Match 2	Match 3	Match 4	Match 5	Final 1	Final 2	Average
Perth Scorchers	Optus Stadium	30,469	41,921	46,471	31,795	41,869	—N/a	—N/a	38,507
Adelaide Strikers	Adelaide Oval	23,654	25,102	41,624	27,212	25,373	—N/a	—N/a	28,593
Brisbane Heat	The Gabba	23,681	30,122	25,023	23,309	30,833	—N/a	—N/a	26,593
Sydney Sixers	SCG; C.ex Int. Stadium	15,217	23,212	—N/a	31,165	30,874	32,107	—N/a	26,515
Melbourne Stars	MCG; Manuka Oval	17,114	10,249*	40,636	21,645	32,360	—N/a	—N/a	24,401
Melbourne Renegades	Marvel Stadium; GMHBA Stadium	13,221*	18,014	18,297	38,031	20,077	—N/a	—N/a	21,528
Sydney Thunder	ENGIE Stadium; Manuka Oval	8,021*	17,547	12,919	—N/a	10,213	13,067	—N/a	12,353
Hobart Hurricanes	Ninja Stadium	7,561	8,049	5,331	7,859	8,573	13,132	15,706	9,459
Average	All	17,367	21,777	27,186	25,859	23,427	18,503		21,927

As of 27 January 2025 - The Final (Hobart Hurricanes vs Sydney Thunder)

* Match played at secondary home

== See also ==
- 2024–25 Women's Big Bash League season
