= Ryan Hicks (cricketer) =

Australian cricketer

- Hicks in 2026

Personal information
- Full name: Ryan Richard Hicks
- Born: 18 March 2005 (age 21)
- Batting: Right-handed
- Bowling: Right-arm leg break
- Role: Wicket-keeper-batter

Domestic team information
- Years: Team
- 2024/25–present: New South Wales

Career statistics
Competition	FC	LA
Matches	6	1
Runs scored	181	29
Batting average	22.62	29.00
100s/50s	0/1	0/0
Top score	50	29
Catches/stumpings	15/0	1/0
- Source: ESPNcricinfo, 23 October 2026

Ryan Hicks (born 18 March 2005) is a professional Australian cricketer who has played first-class cricket for New South Wales.

== Career ==
A wicketkeeper-batter, Hicks played for Australia at the 2024 ICC Under-19 Cricket World Cup, as well as playing unofficial youth tests for the Under-19 team, including a match where he scored a hundred against England in September 2023. Shortly after the Under-19 World Cup, Hicks was awarded his first state rookie contract with New South Wales for the 2024/25 season. Hicks made his first-class debut for New South Wales against Queensland on 28 October 2025 in the 2025–26 Sheffield Shield season.

Hicks was upgraded to a senior contract with New South Wales for the 2026-27 season.
