= Dylan Brasher =

Australian cricketer (born 2001)

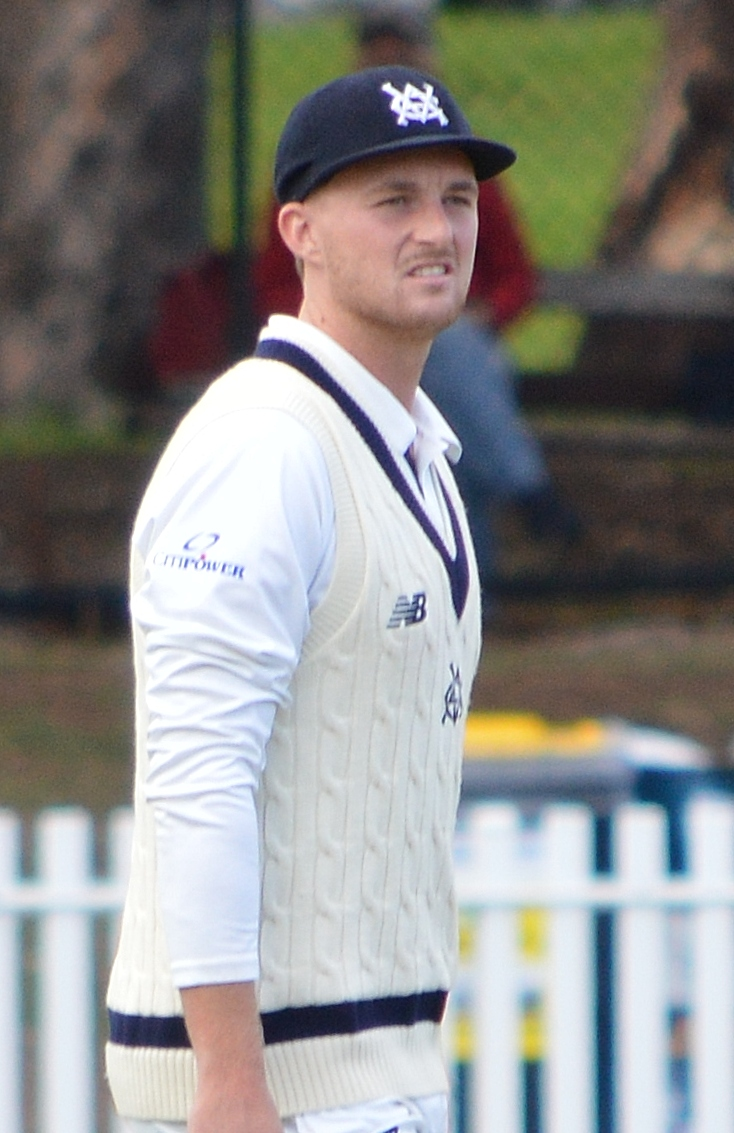
- Brasher playing First Class cricket with Victoria in March 2026

Personal information
- Born: 15 March 2001 (age 25)
- Batting: Left-handed
- Bowling: Right-arm Leg-Break
- Role: Top-order batter

Domestic team information
- Years: Team
- 2023/24–: Victoria (squad no. 20)

Career statistics
Competition	FC	LA
Matches	3	2
Runs scored	118	23
Batting average	23.60	11.50
100s/50s	0/1	0/0
Top score	72	23
Balls bowled	6	–
Wickets	0	–
Bowling average	–	–
5 wickets in innings	0	–
10 wickets in match	0	–
Best bowling	–	–
Catches/stumpings	3/–	1/–
- Source: Cricinfo, 20 September 2026

Dylan Brasher (born 15 March 2001) is an Australian cricketer who has represented Victoria in domestic cricket.

== Early life ==
Brasher was a student at the Maribyrnong Sports Academy. He played with Taylors Lakes Cricket Club in the Victorian Sub-District Cricket Association from Under-10 level.

== Career ==
In 2014, Brasher scored a century for Victoria in the School Sport Australia 12-and-Under Cricket Championships. He also represented Victoria at under 15, under-17s and under-19s level. In 2018, at the Under-18 state championships in Victoria, Brasher became only the seventh batsman to score more than 300 runs for the tournament, finishing with 304 runs at an average of 76.

Brasher plays for the Footscray Cricket Club in the Victorian Premier Cricket competition. He was added to the Victorian cricket squad as a rookie ahead of the 2023-24 Sheffield Shield season.

After a good run of form in Premier Cricket and with Victoria's second XI, Brasher was named in the match squad for Victoria in round seven of the 2025-26 Sheffield Shield season. He made his first-class debut against Queensland. On day three of the match, in Victoria's second innings, Brasher scored a maiden half-century in first class cricket, ending the day with an unbeaten 54. He was eventually dismissed for 72 off 218 balls, with Victoria losing narrowly to Queensland by 36 runs.

Brasher made his List A debut against Western Australia during the 2025-26 One-Day Cup.
