= 2006–07 Ford Ranger One Day Cup season =

2006–07 Ford Ranger One Day Cup
- Administrator: Cricket Australia
- Cricket format: Limited overs
- Tournament format: Double round-robin
- Champions: Queensland (7th title)
- Participants: 6
- Matches: 31
- Player of the series: Matthew Elliott (SA)
- Most runs: Clinton Perren (QLD) (470)
- Most wickets: James Hopes (QLD) (20)

The 2006–07 season of the Ford Ranger One Day Cup was the 38th season of the domestic one-day cricket competition played in Australia. It involved 30 group matches and a final match. The Queensland Bulls defeated the Victorian Bushrangers in the final, played at the Melbourne Cricket Ground.

== Squads ==
Victoria

- Cricket Australia contract: Brad Hodge, Shane Warne, Cameron White
- State contract: Jason Arnberger, Rob Cassell, Adam Crosthwaite, Gerard Denton, Shane Harwood, David Hussey, Nick Jewell, Michael Klinger, Brad Knowles, Michael Lewis, Lloyd Mash, Andrew McDonald, Jon Moss, Dirk Nannes, Peter Siddle, Allan Wise
- Rookie contract: Grant Baldwin, Aiden Blizzard, Aaron Finch, Matthew Gale, Jon Holland, Peter Nevill

New South Wales

- Cricket Australia contract: Nathan Bracken, Stuart Clark, Michael Clarke, Brad Haddin, Phil Jaques, Simon Katich, Brett Lee, Glenn McGrath, and Stuart MacGill
- State contract: Aaron Bird, Doug Bollinger, Mark Cameron, Beau Casson, Ed Cowan, Scott Coyte, Murray Creed, Nathan Hauritz, Moises Henriques, Jason Krejza, Grant Lambert, Tim Lang, Greg Mail, Matthew Nicholson, Aaron O’Brien, James Packman, Grant Roden, Craig Simmons, Daniel Smith, Dominic Thornely
- Rookie contract: Tom Cooper, Peter Forrest, John Hastings, Usman Khawaja, Stephen O’Keefe, Martin Paskal, David Warner

Queensland

- Cricket Australia contract: Matthew Hayden, Mitchell Johnson, Michael Kasprowicz, Andrew Symonds, Shane Watson
- State contract: Andy Bichel, Ryan Broad, Daniel Doran, Chris Hartley, James Hopes, Shane Jurgensen, Nick Kruger, Martin Love, Jimmy Maher, Brendan Nash, Ashley Noffke, Clinton Perren, Craig Philipson, Nathan Rimmington, Chris Simpson, Lachlan Stevens, Grant Sullivan
- Rookie contracts: Murray Bragg, Ben Cutting, Ryan LeLoux, Nathan Reardon

South Australia

- Cricket Australia contract: Daniel Cullen, Jason Gillespie, Shaun Tait
- State contract: Nathan Adcock, Cullen Bailey, Greg Blewett, Cameron Borgas, Ben Cameron, Mark Cleary, Mark Cosgrove, Shane Deitz, Matthew Elliott, Callum Ferguson, Daniel Harris, Ryan Harris, Trent Kelly, Darren Lehmann, Graham Manou, Gary Putland, Paul Rofe
- Rookie contract: Lachlan Oswald-Jacobs, Tom Plant, Simon Roberts, Chadd Sayers, Ken Skewes

Western Australia

- Cricket Australia contract: Adam Gilchrist, Brad Hogg, Mike Hussey, Justin Langer, Damien Martyn
- State contract: David Bandy, Brett Dorey, Ben Edmondson, Sean Ervine, Shawn Gillies, Aaron Heal, Clint Heron, Mathew Inness, Andrew James, Tim MacDonald, Steve Magoffin, Shaun Marsh, Scott Meuleman, Marcus North, Chris Rogers, Luke Ronchi, Adam Voges, Darren Wates, Peter Worthington
- Rookie contract: Arron Crawford, Nathan Coulter-Nile, Liam Davis, Theo Doropoulos, Craig King, Josh Mangan, Luke Pomersbach

Tasmania

- Cricket Australia contract: Ricky Ponting
- State contract: George Bailey, Michael Bevan, Travis Birt, Luke Butterworth, Sean Clingeleffer, David Dawson, Michael Dighton, Michael Di Venuto, Xavier Doherty, Andrew Downtown, Brendan Drew, Brett Geeves, Adam Griffith, Ben Hilfenhaus, Dan Marsh, Tim Paine, Damien Wright
- Rookie contract: Dane Anderson, Alex Doolan, Chris Duval, Jason Shelton, Matthew Wade, Jonathon Wells
- Squad members: Nick Grainer, Scott Kremerskothen, Rhett Lockyear, Darren McNees, Adam Polkinghorne, Jade Selby, Luke Swards, Nathan Wegman

== Table ==
Pos	Team	Pld	W	L	T	NR	BP	Pts	NRR
1	Victoria	10	7	3	0	0	4	32	0.603
2	Queensland	10	6	4	0	0	2	26	0.081
3	Western Australia	10	5	5	0	0	2	22	0.322
4	South Australia	10	5	5	0	0	1	21	−0.094
5	Tasmania	10	4	6	0	0	1	17	−0.502
6	New South Wales	10	3	7	0	0	1	13	−0.445

== Fixtures ==
=== Final ===
25 February 2007 (D/N)
Scorecard

Queensland; 5/274 (50 overs)	v	Victoria; 9/253 (50 overs)
Jimmy Maher 108 (133); Darren Pattinson 2/49 (10 overs)		Andrew McDonald 65* (64); Aaron Nye 3/55 (10 overs)

Queensland won by 21 runs
Melbourne Cricket Ground, Melbourne
Umpires: Daryl Harper and Bob Parry
Player of the match: Jimmy Maher (Queensland)

- Queensland won the toss and elected to bat.
