= Jem Ryan =

Australian cricketer

Personal information
- Full name: Jem Johnson Ryan
- Born: 31 May 2004 (age 22); Pambula, New South Wales, Australia
- Batting: Left-handed
- Bowling: Right-arm fast-medium
- Role: Bowler
- Relatives: Samson Ryan (brother)

Domestic team information
- Years: Team
- 2025/26–: Queensland

Career statistics
Competition	FC
Matches	6
Runs scored	37
Batting average	9.25
100s/50s	0/0
Top score	33
Balls bowled	985
Wickets	24
Bowling average	19.33
5 wickets in innings	0
10 wickets in match	0
Best bowling	3/24
Catches/stumpings	4/–
- Source: Cricinfo, 16 November 2026

Jem Johnson Ryan (born 31 May 2004) is an Australian cricketer who has played for Queensland since the 2025–26 season. His older brother Samson Ryan plays for Richmond in the Australian Football League.

Born in Pambula on the New South Wales south coast in May 2004, Ryan now lives in Queensland, where he attended Toowoomba Grammar School. A right-arm fast-medium bowler, he had back surgery in 2025, and made his first-class debut for Queensland in the second half of the 2025–26 Sheffield Shield season, taking 12 wickets in his first three matches. In his second match, against South Australia, he was Queensland's leading wicket-taker, with 3 for 58 and 2 for 16.
