= Charlie Stobo =

Australian cricketer (born 1995)

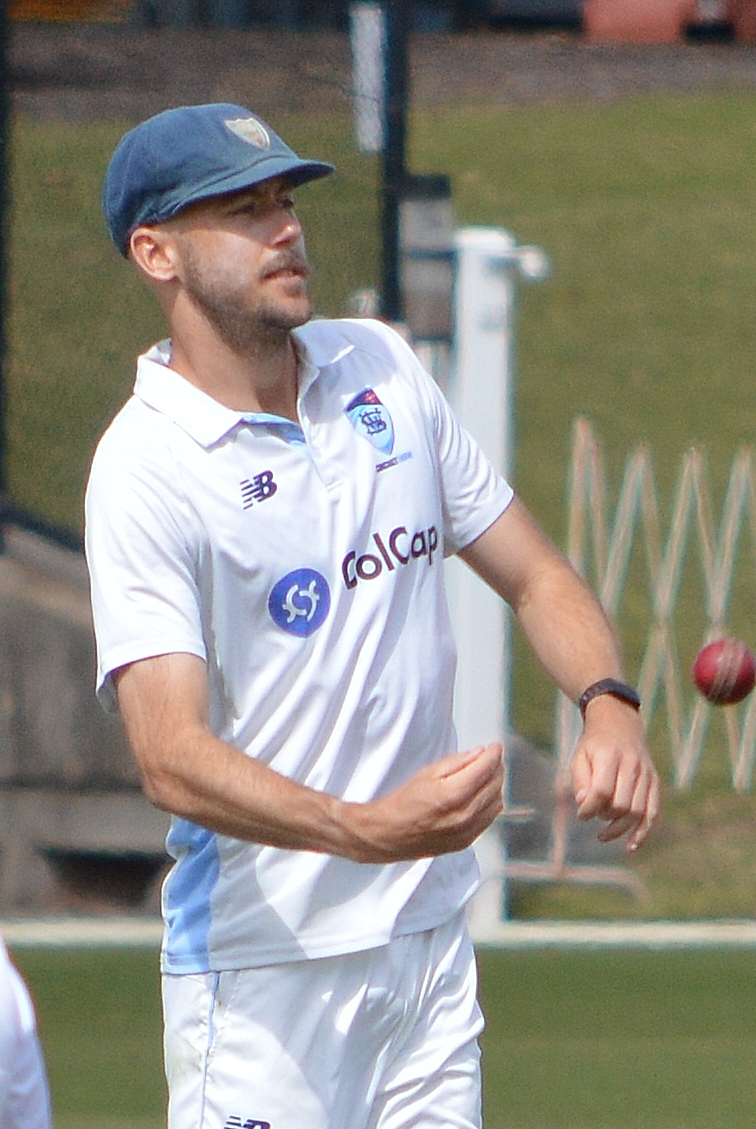
- Stobo playing First Class cricket with New South Wales in October 2025

Personal information
- Full name: Charles Henry Stobo
- Born: 8 March 1995 (age 31); Sydney, New South Wales, Australia
- Batting: Right-handed
- Bowling: Right-arm fast-medium
- Role: Bowling all-rounder

Domestic team information
- Years: Team
- 2016/17–2017/18: New South Wales
- 2017/18: Cricket Australia XI (squad no. 19)
- 2020/21–2024/25: Western Australia (squad no. 8)
- 2024: Kent (squad no. 35)
- 2025/26–: New South Wales (squad no. 13)
- 2025/26–: Sydney Sixers (squad no. 13)
- FC debut: 5 December 2016 NSW v South Australia
- LA debut: 10 October 2017 CA XI v Victoria

Career statistics
Competition	FC	LA	T20
Matches	32	22	2
Runs scored	876	326	–
Batting average	17.87	27.16	–
100s/50s	0/2	0/1	–
Top score	64	72	–
Balls bowled	4,982	1,034	6
Wickets	82	26	2
Bowling average	27.24	33.57	12.50
5 wickets in innings	0	0	0
10 wickets in match	0	0	0
Best bowling	5/9	3/32	1/12
Catches/stumpings	18/–	10/–	0/–
- Source: Cricinfo, 19 October 2026

Charles Henry Stobo (born 8 March 1995) is an Australian cricketer who has represented New South Wales and Western Australia at domestic cricket level. He is the son of former cricketer Richard Stobo.

== Domestic career ==
Stobo made his first-class debut for New South Wales in the 2016–17 Sheffield Shield season on 5 December 2016. He made his List A debut for Cricket Australia XI in the 2017–18 JLT One-Day Cup on 10 October 2017 against Victoria, bowling 7 overs and conceding 57 runs in a big loss. He took his first career List A wicket in his second match, against Tasmania when he got opener Ben McDermott out for 27.

In 2020 he moved to Western Australia, and after strong performances in Western Australia Premier Cricket, Stobo was called into the Western Australia squad for the 2020–21 Marsh One-Day Cup and established himself in both of WA's One-Day and Sheffield Shield teams over the next few years.

In 2025 Stobo returned to NSW.
