= Richard Stobo =

Australian cricketer (born 1965)

Personal information
- Born: 20 June 1965 (age 61); Toowoomba, Queensland, Australia
- Source: ESPNcricinfo, 2 February 2017

Richard Stobo (born 20 June 1965) is an Australian cricketer. He played six first-class and two List A matches for New South Wales between 1988–89 and 1992–93.

== See also ==
- List of New South Wales representative cricketers
