= Thomas Balkin =

Australian cricketer (born 2004)

Personal information
- Born: 8 January 2004 (age 22)
- Batting: Right-handed
- Bowling: Right-arm medium-fast
- Role: Bowler

Domestic team information
- Years: Team
- 2025–: Queensland (squad no. 8)
- 2025/26–: Brisbane Heat (squad no. 95)

Career statistics
Competition	FC	LA	T20
Matches	1	2	5
Runs scored	–	9	10
Batting average	–	–	10.00
100s/50s	0/0	0/0	0/0
Top score	–	9*	9*
Balls bowled	48	78	83
Wickets	1	2	6
Bowling average	41.00	28.00	19.83
5 wickets in innings	0	0	0
10 wickets in match	0	0	0
Best bowling	1/41	1/22	2/30
Catches/stumpings	0/–	0/–	4/–
- Source: CricInfo, 17 March 2026

Thomas Balkin (born 8 January 2004) is an Australian cricketer who has represented Queensland and the Brisbane Heat in domestic cricket.

== Early life ==
Balkin attended school at St Joseph's College, Nudgee. Growing up, he played cricket for the Toombul Cricket Club.

Balkin was mentored by Australian international cricketer Ryan Harris from the age of 15, when Harris coached a Cricket Australia XI, in which Balkin featured, during the under-17 National Championships.

Balkin was part of the Queensland Cricket Academy. In April 2025, Balkin was awarded the Bob Spence Trophy as the most improved Under-21 Male Player in the Queensland Premier Cricket competition.

== Domestic career ==
Balkin represented Queensland at under-17 and under-19 level.

Balkin gained a rookie contract with Queensland in 2025. In December 2025, he was added to the squad of the Brisbane Heat as a Local Replacement Player.

In his debut match against the Adelaide Strikers, after international recruit Shaheen Shah Afridi was injured, Balkin was required to bowl the final over of the match with the Strikers requiring 10 runs to win. He took two wickets and won the match for the Heat.

Balkin made his List A debut for Queensland against Victoria during the 2025–26 One-Day Cup. He took the wicket of Tom Rogers in his first game.

In March 2026, Balkin made his Sheffield Shield debut against Tasmania.

== International Career ==
Balkin was part of the extended squad for Australia at the 2022 Under-19 World Cup, however did not play a game. He represented Australia's under-19 side in their tour of England in 2023.
