= Lachlan Hearne =

Australian cricketer (born 2000)

Personal information
- Full name: Lachlan David Hearne
- Born: 19 December 2000 (age 25); Camperdown, New South Wales, Australia
- Batting: Left-handed
- Bowling: Right-arm off break
- Role: Top-order batter

Domestic team information
- Years: Team
- 2020/21–2021/22: New South Wales (squad no. 22)
- 2024/25–present: Queensland (squad no. 22)
- 2025/26–present: Brisbane Heat (squad no. 22)

Career statistics
Competition	FC	LA	T20
Matches	21	19	2
Runs scored	984	694	3
Batting average	27.33	40.82	1.50
100s/50s	1/7	2/2	0/0
Top score	106	121	2
Balls bowled	12	12	–
Wickets	0	1	–
Bowling average	-	7.00	–
5 wickets in innings	-	0	–
10 wickets in match	-	0	–
Best bowling	-	1/7	–
Catches/stumpings	5/–	6/–	0/–
- Source: ESPNcricinfo, 23 October 2026

Lachlan David Hearne (born 19 December 2000) is an Australian cricketer who plays for Queensland as a batter.

== Career ==
He made his first-class debut on 3 April 2021, for New South Wales in the 2020–21 Sheffield Shield season. Prior to his first-class debut, he was named in Australia's squad for the 2020 Under-19 Cricket World Cup. He made his List A debut on 14 February 2022, for New South Wales in the 2021–22 Marsh One-Day Cup.

Hearne joined the Brisbane Heat ahead of the 2025–26 Big Bash League season.
