= Hugo Burdon =

Australian cricketer (born 2001)

Personal information
- Full name: Hugo Raffles Burdon
- Born: 29 November 2001 (age 24); Singapore
- Batting: Right-handed
- Role: Batting

Domestic team information
- Years: Team
- 2024–present: Queensland

Career statistics
Competition	FC	LA
Matches	8	12
Runs scored	278	266
Batting average	17.37	26.60
100s/50s	0/1	0/2
Top score	59	73
Catches/stumpings	1/–	3/–
- Source: ESPNcricinfo, 23 October 2026

Hugo Raffles Burdon (born 29 November 2001) is an Australian cricketer for Queensland cricket team. He is a right-handed batsman.

== Early life ==
He is from the Gold Coast, Queensland, and attended The Southport School. He represented Queensland at Under-17 and Under-19 level. He made his first grade debut in Premier Cricket as a 17-year-old and plays for Gold Coast District Cricket Club.

== Career ==
He was part of the Brisbane Heat squad during Big Bash League in the 2021-22 and 2023-24 seasons.

He made his debut for Queensland Bulls on 8 February 2024 against Tasmania Tigers in the One-Day Cup. He signed a professional contract with Queensland cricket team in April 2024. He continued to play for Queensland Bulls during the 2024-25 season. Burdon made his First Class debut for Queensland Bulls vs Western Australia on 18-21 February 2025.
