= Doug Warren (cricketer) =

Australian cricketer

Personal information
- Full name: Douglas Warren
- Born: 17 July 2001 (age 25)
- Batting: Left-handed
- Bowling: Left arm orthodox spin

Domestic team information
- Years: Team
- 2023–present: Victoria
- 2024/25–present: Melbourne Stars
- FC debut: 14 November 2023 Victoria v Queensland

Career statistics
Competition	FC	LA	T20
Matches	5	3	3
Runs scored	52	9	13
Batting average	26.00	9.00	6.50
100s/50s	0/0	0/0	0/0
Top score	20	6*	7
Balls bowled	943	138	55
Wickets	14	3	2
Bowling average	38.35	40.66	40.50
5 wickets in innings	1	0	0
10 wickets in match	0	0	0
Best bowling	5/69	2/54	1/18
Catches/stumpings	3/–	1/-	0/–
- Source: CricInfo, 18 October 2026

Doug Warren (born 17 July 2001) is an Australian cricketer who plays for Victoria and Melbourne Stars as a left arm orthodox spin bowler. He is a left-handed batsman.

== Career ==
Warren was awarded a rookie contract with Victoria in May 2023. This came after he made his debut for the Victoria Second XI in February 2023.

He made his Sheffield Shield debut on 16 November 2023 for Victoria against Queensland. Coach David Hussey called it an "impressive debut". With first-choice spin bowler Todd Murphy injured, he retained his place for the following week's fixture against South Australia.

In September 2024, he signed with the Melbourne Stars for the Big Bash League. He made his Big Bash debut on 20 December 2024 against Adelaide Strikers.

== Personal life ==
Warren studied a Bachelor of Commerce at Melbourne University.
