= Liam Haskett =

Australian cricketer (born 2001)

Personal information
- Born: 31 May 2001 (age 25); Perth, Western Australia
- Batting: Right-handed
- Bowling: Left-arm fast medium
- Role: Bowler

Domestic team information
- Years: Team
- 2023/24: Western Australia
- 2024/25: Adelaide Strikers
- FC debut: 3 October 2023 Western Australia v Victoria

Career statistics
Competition	FC	LA	T20
Matches	11	3	5
Runs scored	76	2	7
Batting average	8.44	1.00	7.00
100s/50s	0/0	0/0	0/0
Top score	17	2	5
Balls bowled	1,802	120	96
Wickets	33	3	3
Bowling average	30.42	49.00	70.00
5 wickets in innings	0	0	0
10 wickets in match	0	0	0
Best bowling	3/12	2/72	2/43
Catches/stumpings	3/–	1/–	2/–
- Source: CricInfo, 23 October 2026

Liam Haskett (born 31 May 2001) is an Australian cricketer who plays for Western Australia and Adelaide Strikers. He is a left arm fast medium bowler and right handed bastsman. He made his First-class cricket debut on 3 October 2023 against Victoria.

== Career ==
Described as a tall left-arm quick capable of extracting significant bounce, Haskett featured for Claremont-Nedlands in grade cricket and took 21 wickets at an average of 19.62 during the 2022–23 season, leading to a call up to the Western Australia second-XI. He was awarded a rookie contract with Western Australia in May 2023.

Haskett was brought into the Western Australia match day squad for their opening fixture of the 2023–24 Sheffield Shield season, at home against Victoria. He subsequently made his first-class debut in the match starting on 3 October 2023. His maiden wicket in first class cricket was Travis Dean in the Victorian first innings.

In December 2023, Haskett signed with the Perth Scorchers ahead of the 2023–24 Big Bash League season. In April 2024, he was upgraded from a rookie contract to a full contract with Western Australia.

Haskett joined the Adelaide Strikers for the 2024–25 Big Bash League season. He made his debut against Brisbane Heat on 11 January 2025.

== Personal life ==
Haskett's father Lloyd Haskett is a former Australian rules footballer with Western Australian Football League (WAFL) clubs East Perth and West Perth.
