= Jack Sinfield (cricketer) =

Australian cricketer

Personal information
- Born: 27 April 2003 (age 23)
- Batting: Left-handed
- Bowling: Right arm off break

Domestic team information
- Years: Team
- 2023-: Queensland
- FC debut: 21 February 2023 2023 Queensland v New South Wales
- LA debut: 14 February 2023 2023 Queensland v Victoria

Career statistics
Competition	FC	LA
Matches	4	1
Runs scored	58	7
Batting average	29.00	7.00
100s/50s	0/0	0/0
Top score	29	7
Balls bowled	725	60
Wickets	8	0
Bowling average	54.12	-
5 wickets in innings	0	0
10 wickets in match	0	0
Best bowling	3/46	0/59
Catches/stumpings	2/–	0/–
- Source: CricInfo, 18 October 2025

Jack Sinfield (born 27 April 2003) is an Australian cricketer. He is a left-handed batsman and right-arm offbreak bowler. He made his list-A debut for Queensland Cricket on 14 February 2023 away against Victoria. He made his first-class cricket debut on 21 February 2023 against New South Wales cricket team. Sinfield was named in the Australia squad for the 2022 Under-19 World Cup.

== Career ==
From Gold Coast, Sinfield came through the Redlands grade cricket side that has also produced the likes of Sam Heazlett, Jimmy Peirson, James Bazley and Marnus Labuschagne for Queensland Cricket. In December 2020 he was brought into the Brisbane Heat squad for the Big Bash.

Sinfield made his list-A debut for Queensland Cricket on 14 February 2023 away against Victoria in the Marsh Cup, Sinfield made his first-class cricket debut for Queensland Cricket on 21 February 2023 against New South Wales, taking 3-46. He was retained on a rookie contract for the 2023–24 season by Queensland.

== International career ==
Sinfield was named in the Australia squad for the 2022 Under-19 World Cup.
