= Tom Straker =

Australian cricketer (born 2005)

Personal information
- Born: 19 March 2005 (age 21); Caringbah, New South Wales, Australia
- Batting: Right-handed
- Bowling: Right-arm medium
- Role: Bowler

Domestic team information
- Years: Team
- 2024-: Queensland

Career statistics
Competition	FC	LA
Matches	13	12
Runs scored	129	25
Batting average	10.75	8.33
100s/50s	0/0	0/0
Top score	36*	16
Balls bowled	2,011	536
Wickets	29	18
Bowling average	35.58	35.33
5 wickets in innings	0	0
10 wickets in match	0	0
Best bowling	4/32	4/50
Catches/stumpings	3/–	2/–
- Source: ESPNcricinfo, 18 October 2026

Tom Straker (born 19 March 2005) is an Australian cricketer who plays for the Queensland cricket team. He is a right-arm medium pace bowler and right-handed batsman.

== Career ==
He made his debut for the Australia national under-19 cricket team against England U19 in January 2023. He was selected to tour England with the Australia U19 side in July 2023. He was a member of the NSW Metro side that won the Australian national U19 title in December 2023.

He played for Australia U19 as they won the 2024 Under-19 Cricket World Cup, taking six wickets for 24 runs in a man-of-the-match performance in the semi-final against Pakistan U19 in February 2024. This was the best figures ever recorded in a U19 World Cup semi final or final, eclipsing the 6-25 set in 2014 by Kagiso Rabada.

He signed a rookie contract with Queensland cricket team in April 2024. He made his List A debut for Queensland Bulls on 25 September 2024 against Tasmania Tigers in the One-Day Cup. He made his first-class debut for Queensland on 8 October 2024 against Western Australia in the Sheffield Shield. His best bowling figures in his debut season was when he took 4/87 against NSW. He was upgraded to a full time contract in May 2025.

== Personal life ==
A member of Sutherland Cricket Club, he is nicknamed 'Monster Truck'.
