= Charlie Wakim =

Australian cricketer (born 1991)

Personal information
- Full name: Charles Arthur Wakim
- Born: 9 July 1991 (age 35); Paddington, Sydney, Australia
- Batting: Right-handed
- Bowling: Right-arm off break
- Role: Batter

Domestic team information
- Years: Team
- 2017/18–2025/26: Tasmania (squad no. 9)
- 2018: Hobart Hurricanes (squad no. 19)
- 2021/22: Melbourne Stars (squad no. 48)
- 2023/24: Brisbane Heat (squad no. 98)

Career statistics
Competition	FC	LA	T20
Matches	39	14	9
Runs scored	2,101	485	125
Batting average	29.59	34.64	13.88
100s/50s	3/10	0/3	0/0
Top score	160	82	43
Balls bowled	94	–	6
Wickets	1	–	0
Bowling average	81.00	–	–
5 wickets in innings	0	–	0
10 wickets in match	0	–	–
Best bowling	1/27	–	–
Catches/stumpings	27/–	7/–	3/–
- Source: ESPNcricinfo, 20 May 2026

Charles Arthur Wakim (born 9 July 1991) is a former Australian cricketer who played for Tasmania in the Sheffield Shield. He has also played for Hobart Hurricanes, Melbourne Stars and Brisbane Heat in the Big Bash League (BBL).

== Early life ==
Wakim was born in Sydney and has Lebanese ancestry. He grew up in Kensington, an inner-city Sydney suburb. After attending Waverley College, he studied at the University of New South Wales.

== Cricket career ==
He made his List A debut for Tasmania in the 2017–18 JLT One-Day Cup on 2 October 2017. In September 2018, he was named in the Hobart Hurricanes' squad for the 2018 Abu Dhabi T20 Trophy. He made his Twenty20 debut for the Hobart Hurricanes in the 2018 Abu Dhabi T20 Trophy on 5 October 2018. He made his first-class debut for Tasmania in the 2018–19 Sheffield Shield season on 23 February 2019, scoring 160 and 22 in Tasmania's five-wicket victory.

Wakim was called up to play for the Melbourne Stars against the Perth Scorchers at the Junction Oval on 2 January 2022, being brought into the squad for the 2021–22 Big Bash after several members of the original squad became unavailable due to illness.

Wakim was delisted by Tasmania at the end of the 2025-26 season.
