= Queensland cricket team =

Australian cricket team

Queensland Bulls

Personnel
- Captain: (Australia) Marnus Labuschagne
- Coach: James Hopes

Team information
- Colors: Maroon Gold
- Founded: 1882; 144 years ago
- Home ground: The Gabba
- Capacity: 42,000
- Secondary home ground: Allan Border Field
- Secondary ground capacity: 6,500

History
- First-class debut: NSW in 1892 at The Gabba
- Sheffield Shield wins: 9 (1995, 1997, 2000, 2001, 2002, 2006, 2012, 2018, 2021).
- One Day Cup wins: 10 (1976, 1981, 1982, 1989, 1996, 1998, 2007, 2013, 2014)
- Twenty20 Cup wins: 0
- Official website: Queensland Bulls
First-class
One-day

The Queensland men's cricket team (also known as the Queensland Bulls) are an Australian men's professional cricket team based in Queensland. The team competes in Sheffield Shield, the highest level of Australia domestic first class cricket, since the 1926–27 season, as well as the One-Day Cup, the highest level of Australian domestic one-day, since its inception in 1969–70. They also competed in the now defunct KFC Twenty20 Big Bash.

== History ==
=== 1824 to 1926/27 ===
The first European settlement in Queensland was a penal colony established at Redcliffe in 1824, which moved to Brisbane the following year. Free settlers first arrived in 1842.

The earliest evidence of cricket being played in Queensland is in 1857, two years prior to separation from New South Wales and statehood. A match between Brisbane and Ipswich was held in 1859 while in 1860 a Toowoomba team played Dalby. By 1862, there were also teams in Warwick, Maryborough, Gayndah, Gympie, Rockhampton and the Lockyer Valley.

Queensland's first inter-colonial (i.e. representative) match was in 1864 when their XXII was beaten by a New South Wales XI. In 1875, Queensland recorded their first victory when their XVIII beat the NSW XI. That victory was a catalyst for the formation of the Queensland Cricket Association in 1876. Queensland was finally granted first-class status in 1892/93, winning its inaugural first-class match against NSW in that season by 14 runs. Queensland rarely played more than two inter-colonial matches per season from 1892 to 1893, with generally one match (and often both) against New South Wales. The tyranny of distance and non-professional status of the players severely limited opportunities for more first-class competition during this period.

The Sheffield Shield competition started in 1892/93 but Queensland's initial applications for admission were refused. Despite their minimal first-class exposure, Queensland still produced four Australian Test players prior to their Sheffield Shield debut, though none played more than six Tests. The first was the colourful Arthur Coningham who played his only Test in 1895. Remarkably, he took a wicket with his very first delivery (it was also the first ball of the Test). He also scored Queensland's initial first-class century, 151 against NSW.

1910/11 was a very successful season as Queensland recorded three first-class wins for the first time, beating NSW home and away and Victoria in Melbourne in their only three games of the summer.

=== 1926/27 to 1963/64 ===
Queensland was finally admitted to the Sheffield Shield in 1926/27 and had a successful debut year, defeating NSW in their first-ever Shield match and also eventual winners South Australia in their only meeting. Like most new teams, the side struggled to maintain that level of performance and finished last in the (then) four-team competition 15 times in its first 19 seasons. However, the decision to include Queensland quickly paid off with the emergence of regular Test players such as Bill Brown, Don Tallon, Percy Hornibrook and Ron Oxenham. Brisbane hosted its first Test match in 1928/29 when Australia met England at the Exhibition Ground.

By the early 1950s, Queensland had a very competitive side and was regularly finishing in the top three of the (now) five-team Shield following Western Australia's admission in 1946/47. In 1956/57, they finished an agonising one point behind winners NSW. More Australian players were produced, including Ron Archer, Wally Grout, Ken 'Slasher' Mackay and Peter Burge. Another highlight of this period was the dramatic Tied Test between Australia and the West Indies at the Gabba in 1960/61.

=== 1964/65 to 1972/73 ===
This period was undoubtedly Queensland's worst era, finishing last eight times in nine Shield seasons. Rock bottom was reached in 1967–68 when the side failed to win a single game. The Queensland Cricket Association (QCA) decided to recruit high-profile interstate players to revive the team's fortunes. Greg Chappell was vice-captain of South Australia under brother Ian and was lured north for the 1973/74 season with the promise of the Queensland captaincy. Emerging pace bowler Jeff Thomson followed the next year.

=== 1973/74 to 1993/94 ===
The addition of Chappell and Thomson to a side containing players such as Sam Trimble, Martin Kent, Tony Dell and Geoff Dymock had an immediate impact. Queensland gained four seconds and a third over the next five seasons, as well as winning the domestic one day cup in 1975/76, Queensland's first piece of silverware.

The Queensland teams of the 1980s were even stronger, featuring many outstanding cricketers, both "home-grown" like Craig McDermott, Carl Rackemann and Ian Healy and others attracted from interstate or overseas such as Vivian Richards, Allan Border, Kepler Wessels and Ian Botham. Queensland were runners up five times in seven seasons in the 1980s (including a heartbreaking one wicket loss to NSW in 1984/85), and won the one-day trophy three more times in this period, but their first Shield win still proved elusive.

=== 1994/95 to date ===
The 68-year wait finally came to an end in the 1994/95 season when Stuart Law led Queensland to their inaugural Sheffield Shield win after finishing last the previous year.

Since their breakthrough win, Queensland has enjoyed a golden era, winning the competition a further eight times (including three consecutive seasons from 1999/2000 to 2001/02) and also finishing as runners-up seven times. Since Tasmania were admitted in 1977/78, the Bulls have finished in sixth (i.e. last) place just twice.

== Colours and mascot ==
The primary club colour of Queensland Bulls is Maroon which represents the state colour of Queensland. The secondary club colour is Gold, with additional contrasting colour of white.

The "Bulls" mascot and nickname were adopted at the commencement of the 1993/94 season.

== Home grounds ==
The side plays most of its home games at the Brisbane Cricket Ground, generally referred to as "the Gabba", a contraction of the suburb name of Woolloongabba in which it is located. Matches are occasionally played at Allan Border Field in Albion, a suburb of Inner North-Eastern Brisbane and Cazaly's Stadium in Cairns, the largest city in Far North Queensland. 28 first-class games and two Tests were played at the Exhibition Ground between 1893 and 1931.

== Current squad ==
Players with international caps are listed in bold.

No.	Name	Nationality	Birth date	Batting style	Bowling style	Notes
Batters
17	Max Bryant	Australia	3 October 1999 (age 27)	Right-handed	Right-arm medium	
29	Hugo Burdon	Australia	29 November 2001 (age 24)	Right-handed	Right-arm fast	
21	Jack Clayton	Australia	25 February 1999 (age 27)	Left-handed	Left-arm wrist spin	
22	Lachlan Hearne	Australia	14 October 2000 (age 26)	Left-handed	—N/a	
18	**Usman Khawaja**	Australia	18 December 1986 (age 39)	Left-handed	Right-arm off break	Cricket Australia contract
33	**Marnus Labuschagne**	Australia	22 June 1994 (age 32)	Right-handed	Right-arm leg break	Captain & Cricket Australia contract
48	Angus Lovell	Australia	12 September 1999 (age 27)	Right-handed	—N/a	
77	**Matt Renshaw**	Australia	28 March 1996 (age 30)	Left-handed	Right-arm off break	
23	Hugh Weibgen	Australia	28 October 2004 (age 21)	Right-handed	Right-arm off break	
All-rounders
20	**Michael Neser**	Australia	29 March 1990 (age 36)	Right-handed	Right-arm medium-fast	Cricket Australia contract
24	**Jack Wildermuth**	Australia	1 September 1993 (age 33)	Right-handed	Right-arm medium-fast	
Wicket-keeper
-	Lachlan Aitken	Australia	2 February 2005 (age 21)	Right-handed	—N/a	
59	Jimmy Peirson	Australia	13 October 1992 (age 34)	Right-handed	—N/a	
Spin bowlers
27	Jack Sinfield	Australia	27 April 2003 (age 23)	Left-handed	Right-arm off break	Rookie contract
4	**Mitch Swepson**	Australia	4 October 1993 (age 33)	Right-handed	Right-arm leg break	Vice-captain
Pace bowlers
8	Thomas Balkin	Australia	8 January 2004 (age 22)	Right-handed	Right-arm medium	Rookie contract
19	**Xavier Bartlett**	Australia	17 December 1998 (age 27)	Right-handed	Right-arm fast-medium	Cricket Australia contract
54	Oliver Patterson	Australia	3 January 2006 (age 20)	Right-handed	Left-arm medium	Rookie contract
9	Jem Ryan	Australia	31 May 2004 (age 22)	Left-handed	Right-arm fast	Rookie contract
14	**Gurinder Sandhu**	Australia	14 June 1993 (age 33)	Left-handed	Right-arm fast-medium	
16	Mark Steketee	Australia	17 January 1994 (age 32)	Right-handed	Right-arm fast-medium	
45	Tom Straker	Australia	19 March 2005 (age 21)	Right-handed	Right-arm medium	
98	Callum Vidler	Australia	14 October 2005 (age 21)	Right-handed	Right-arm medium	
31	Tom Whitney	Australia	7 November 2002 (age 23)	Right-handed	Right-arm fast-medium	Rookie contract

Source(s): QLD Bulls – Players

== Test players ==
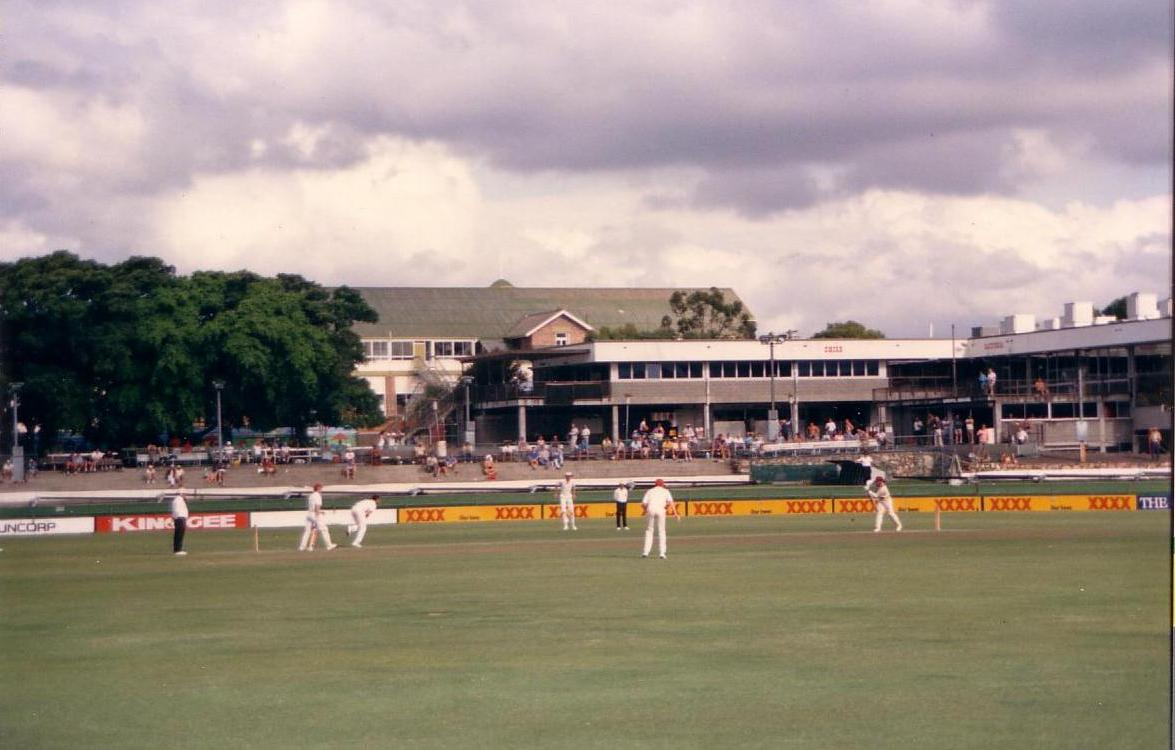
Queensland versus South Australia in a Sheffield Shield match at the 'Gabba, during the mid-1980s

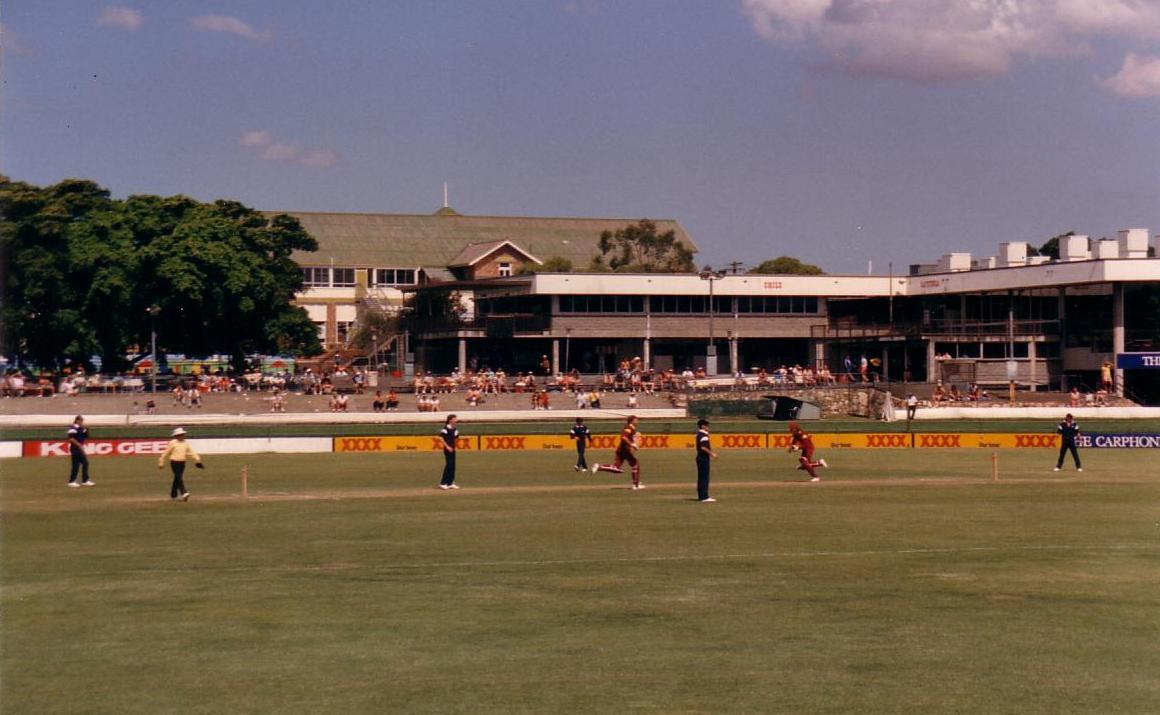
Queensland Bulls versus Victorian Bushrangers in a limited overs one-day cricket match at the 'Gabba during the mid-1980s

Queensland has produced more than 50 players who have represented Australia in Test matches, while a number of Test players from other countries have played for the team. For a fuller list of players, see Queensland cricketers.

- Andy Bichel
- Allan Border
- Ian Botham
- Bill Brown
- Peter Burge
- Joe Burns
- Greg Chappell
- Tony Dell
- Peter George
- Wally Grout
- Wes Hall
- Ryan Harris
- Matthew Hayden
- Ian Healy
- Graeme Hick
- Trevor Hohns
- Alec Hurwood
- Mitchell Johnson
- Michael Kasprowicz
- Usman Khawaja
- Marnus Labuschagne
- Stuart Law
- Ray Lindwall
- Martin Love
- Colin McCool
- Craig McDermott
- Ken Mackay
- Michael Neser
- Carl Rackemann
- Matt Renshaw
- Viv Richards
- Greg Ritchie
- Andrew Symonds
- Don Tallon
- Jeff Thomson
- Shane Watson

== Titles ==
=== Sheffield Shield ===
9 titles:

- 1994/95
- 1996/97
- 1999/2000
- 2000/01
- 2001/02
- 2005/06
- 2011/12
- 2017/18
- 2020/21

=== Domestic One-Day Cup ===
10 titles:

- 1975/76
- 1980/81
- 1981/82
- 1988/89
- 1995/96
- 1997/98
- 2006/07
- 2008/09
- 2012/13
- 2013/14

== First-class records ==
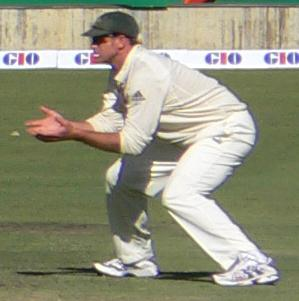
Matthew Hayden

=== Batting records ===
Most runs for Queensland

Player	Runs	Career
Martin Love	10297	1992/93 – 2008/09
Stuart Law	9920	1988/89 – 2003/04
Jimmy Maher	9889	1993/94 – 2007/08
Sam Trimble	9465	1959/60 – 1975/76
Matthew Hayden	8831	1991/92 – 2007/08
Allan Border	7661	1980/81 – 1995/96

Highest individual score:

- Martin Love 300* vs Victoria in 2003/04

Most centuries:

- Martin Love 28

Most runs in a season:

- Stuart Law 1204 runs in 1990/91

Highest partnership:

- Kepler Wessels and Robbie Kerr 388 vs Victoria in 1982/83

Highest team score:

- 900/6d vs Victoria in 2005/06

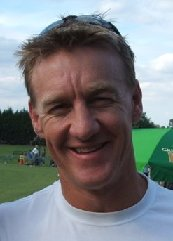
Andy Bichel

=== Bowling records ===
Most wickets for Queensland

Player	Wickets	Career
Michael Kasprowicz	498	1989/90 – 2007/08
Andy Bichel	463	1992/93 – 2007/08
Carl Rackemann	425	1979/80 – 1995/96
Jeff Thomson	349	1974/75 – 1985/86
Craig McDermott	329	1983/84 – 1995/96
Geoff Dymock	309	1971/72 – 1981/82

Most wickets in a season:

- Michael Kasprowicz 64 wickets in 1995/96

Most wickets in an innings:

- Peter Allan 10/61 vs Victoria in 1965/66

Most wickets in a match:

- Peter Allan 13/110 vs NSW in 1968/69

== See also ==
- Queensland Cricket
- List of Queensland first-class cricketers
- Cricket in Queensland
