= 2023–24 Sheffield Shield season =

Cricket tournament

2023–24 Sheffield Shield
- Dates: 3 October 2023 – 25 March 2024
- Administrator: Cricket Australia
- Cricket format: First-class
- Tournament format(s): Double round-robin and final
- Champions: Western Australia (18th title)
- Participants: 6
- Matches: 31
- Player of the series: Beau Webster (Tasmania)
- Most runs: Beau Webster (Tasmania) (938)
- Most wickets: Chris Tremain (New South Wales) (50)

The 2023–24 Sheffield Shield season was the 122nd of the Australian inter-state domestic first-class cricket competition. Cricket Australia revealed the season fixtures in June 2023. The tournament opened in October 2023 with Western Australia the defending champions. Finishing first the previous season, Western Australia hosted the final at the WACA Ground in Perth, defeating Tasmania by 377 runs on March 24, 2024, to complete a hat-trick of three consecutive titles.

== Points table ==
Pos	Team	Pld	W	L	D	A	BP	DP	Pts
1	Western Australia	10	5	2	3	0	14.93	0	47.93
2	Tasmania	10	5	2	3	0	14.36	0	47.36
3	New South Wales	10	4	3	3	0	15.31	0	42.31
4	Victoria	10	4	4	2	0	12.94	0	38.94
5	South Australia	10	3	6	1	0	14.49	0	33.49
6	Queensland	10	2	6	2	0	11.84	0	25.84
Source: ESPNcricinfo

== Round-Robin stage ==
=== Round 1 ===
3–5 October 2023
Scorecard

(home team) South Australia	v	Tasmania
307 (63.4 overs); Jake Lehmann 115 (143); Gabe Bell 3/68 (14.4 overs)		381 (102.1 overs); Charlie Wakim 110 (144); Jordan Buckingham 7/71 (23.1 overs)
157 (44.4 overs); Nathan McSweeney 48 (97); Beau Webster 4/32 (11.4 overs)		3/84 (19.5 overs); Jake Weatherald 29 (52); Brendan Doggett 2/23 (6.5 overs)

Tasmania won by 7 wickets
Karen Rolton Oval, Adelaide
Umpires: Greg Davidson and Sam Nogajski
Player of the match: Charlie Wakim (Tasmania)

- South Australia won the toss and elected to bat.
- Mitchell Owen (Tasmania) made his First Class debut.
- Points: Tasmania 8.73, South Australia 1.87.

4–7 October 2023
Scorecard

Queensland	v	New South Wales (home team)
176 (66.2 overs); Bryce Street 45 (98); Jack Edwards 6/36 (15 overs)		446 (117.2 overs); Jack Edwards 87 (117); Mitchell Swepson 3/73 (27.2 overs)
7/417 (142.4 overs); Michael Neser 140 (292); Chris Tremain 3/77 (27 overs)

Match drawn
Cricket Central, Sydney
Umpires: Nathan Johnstone and Simon Lightbody
Player of the match: Jack Edwards (New South Wales)

- New South Wales won the toss and elected to field.
- Points: New South Wales 3.79, Queensland 1.70.

4–7 October 2023
Scorecard

Victoria	v	Western Australia (home team)
256 (82.4 overs); Travis Dean 87 (158); Aaron Hardie 3/29 (16 overs)		481 (157.1 overs); Cameron Bancroft 122 (319); Will Sutherland 3/66 (19 overs)
172 (95.2 overs); Mitchell Perry 43 (173); Corey Rocchiccioli 3/14 (26.2 overs)

Western Australia won by an innings and 53 runs
WACA Ground, Perth
Umpires: Gerard Abood and Shawn Craig
Player of the match: Cameron Bancroft (Western Australia)

- Western Australia won the toss and elected to field.
- Liam Haskett (Western Australia) made his First Class debut.
- Points: Western Australia 7.31, Victoria 0.76.

=== Round 2 ===
14–17 October 2023
Scorecard

Victoria	v	Queensland (home team)
253 (80 overs); Matthew Short 100 (175); Gurinder Sandhu 3/68 (20 overs)		9/501d (152 overs); Matt Renshaw 135 (262); Cameron McClure 3/86 (22 overs)
144 (64.4 overs); Peter Handscomb 43 (147); Mitchell Swepson 5/39 (16.4 overs)

Queensland won by an innings and 104 runs
Great Barrier Reef Arena, Mackay
Umpires: Donovan Koch and Sharad Patel
Player of the match: Matt Renshaw (Queensland)

- Queensland won the toss and elected to field.
- Points: Queensland 7.83, Victoria 0.93

15–18 October 2023
Scorecard

(home team) South Australia	v	New South Wales
293 (97.3 overs); Nathan McSweeney 64 (172); Chris Tremain 4/57 (23.3 overs)		183 (58.4 overs); Matthew Gilkes 57 (85); Nathan McAndrew 5/42 (15.4 overs)
212 (71.1 overs); Nathan McSweeney 100 (160); Jack Nisbet 5/53 (13.1 overs)		136 (54.1 overs); Daniel Hughes 58 (137); Nathan McAndrew 5/19 (14.1 overs)

South Australia won by 186 runs
Adelaide Oval, Adelaide
Umpires: Michael Graham-Smith and Troy Penman
Player of the match: Nathan McSweeney (South Australia)

- New South Wales won the toss and elected to field.
- Jack Nisbet (New South Wales) made his First Class debut.
- Points: South Australia 7.93, New South Wales 1.00

15–18 October 2023
Scorecard

Tasmania	v	Western Australia (home team)
439 (134.2 overs); Jordan Silk 181 (349); Charles Stobo 3/87 (26.2 overs)		8/574d (179 overs); Sam Whiteman 188 (383); Gabe Bell 3/80 (33 overs)
5/129 (65.2 overs); Beau Webster 32* (91); Liam Haskett 2/17 (11 overs)

Match drawn
WACA Ground, Perth
Umpires: Sam Nogajski and Stephen Dionysius
Player of the match: Sam Whiteman (Western Australia)

- Tasmania won the toss and elected to bat.
- Points: Tasmania 2.23, Western Australia 2.46

=== Round 3 ===
26–29 October 2023
Scorecard

(home team) Victoria	v	New South Wales
196 (86.2 overs); Peter Handscomb 43 (94); Chris Tremain 4/32 (17.2 overs)		102 (41.1 overs); Jackson Bird 29 (23); Fergus O'Neill 4/23 (12 overs)
284 (87.3 overs); Fergus O'Neill 70 (79); Chris Tremain 4/50 (21.3 overs)		173 (76.1 overs); Jason Sangha 78 (142); Will Sutherland 3/21 (18 overs)

Victoria won by 205 runs
Melbourne Cricket Ground, Melbourne
Umpires: Donovan Koch and Gerard Abood
Player of the match: Fergus O'Neill (Victoria)

- New South Wales won the toss and elected to field.
- Only 81 overs were possible on day 1 due to a wet outfield.
- Points: Victoria 7.00, New South Wales 1.00

26–29 October 2023
Scorecard

Queensland	v	Tasmania (home team)
379 (123.3 overs); Joe Burns 133 (285); Gabe Bell 3/65 (22 overs)		150 (67 overs); Beau Webster 59 (145); Mark Steketee 4/42 (16 overs)
6/202d (58 overs); Matt Renshaw 57 (109); Bradley Hope 3/25 (11 overs)		7/432 (122.2 overs); Matthew Wade 105 (167); Michael Neser 2/76 (26 overs)

Tasmania won by 3 wickets
Bellerive Oval, Hobart
Umpires: Ben Treloar and Michael Graham-Smith
Player of the match: Matthew Wade (Tasmania)

- Tasmania won the toss and elected to field.
- Points: Tasmania 6.50, Queensland 2.03

26–29 October 2023
Scorecard

Western Australia	v	South Australia (home team)
241 (87.4 overs); Cameron Bancroft 57 (124); Wes Agar 6/42 (22.4 overs)		264 (85.4 overs); Ben Manenti 86 (107); Joel Paris 6/74 (22 overs)
8/377d (105 overs); Cameron Bancroft 100 (221); Wes Agar 2/60 (18 overs)		154 (62.5 overs); Henry Hunt 28 (89); Joel Paris 5/39 (17.5 overs)

Western Australia won by 200 runs
Adelaide Oval, Adelaide
Umpires: David Taylor and Phillip Gillespie
Player of the match: Joel Paris (Western Australia)

- Western Australia won the toss and elected to bat.
- Points: Western Australia 7.41, South Australia 1.64

=== Round 4 ===
5–8 November 2023
Scorecard

Tasmania	v	Victoria (home team)
452 (148.2 overs); Charlie Wakim 148 (269); Will Sutherland 3/83 (25 overs)		373 (118.3 overs); Marcus Harris 164 (306); Mitchell Owen 3/38 (17 overs)
2/183 (68 overs); Jordan Silk 82* (181); Peter Siddle 1/16 (9.4 overs)

Match drawn
Junction Oval, Melbourne
Umpires: Shawn Craig and Simon Lightbody
Player of the match: Marcus Harris (Victoria)

- Victoria won the toss and elected to field.
- Travis Dean was replaced by Campbell Kellaway during the match after sustaining a concussion.
- Points: Victoria 2.58, Tasmania 2.40

6–8 November 2023
Scorecard

Western Australia	v	New South Wales (home team)
141 (62.5 overs); Cameron Bancroft 34 (88); Liam Hatcher 4/56 (15.5 overs)		276 (73.3 overs); Oliver Davies 129 (143); Lance Morris 3/87 (17.3 overs)
136 (63.1 overs); Cameron Bancroft 54 (160); Chris Tremain 5/35 (20 overs)		0/4 (0.4 overs); Ryan Hackney 4* (4); Lance Morris 0/4 (0.4 overs)

New South Wales won by 10 wickets
Sydney Cricket Ground, Sydney
Umpires: Ben Treloar and Greg Davidson
Player of the match: Oliver Davies (New South Wales)

- New South Wales won the toss and elected to field.
- Hamish McKenzie (Western Australia) made his first-class debut.
- Oliver Davies (New South Wales) scored his maiden century in first-class cricket.
- Points: New South Wales 7.76, Western Australia 1.00

6–9 November 2023
Scorecard

South Australia	v	Queensland (home team)
5/359d (129.4 overs); Henry Hunt 162 (371); Matt Renshaw 1/8 (0.4 overs)		238 (80.1 overs); Jimmy Peirson 61 (123); Nathan McAndrew 6/41 (23.1 overs)
151 (53.4 overs); Jake Fraser-McGurk 33 (48); Gurinder Sandhu 4/31 (15.4 overs)		269 (88.4 overs); Usman Khawaja 114 (226); Nathan McAndrew 3/60 (25 overs)

South Australia won by 3 runs
The Gabba, Brisbane
Umpires: Donovan Koch and Nathan Johnstone
Player of the match: Nathan McAndrew (South Australia)

- Queensland won the toss and elected to field.
- Only 79.2 overs of play were possible on day 1 due to rain.
- Points: South Australia 7.45, Queensland 0.58

=== Round 5 ===
15–17 November 2023
Scorecard

South Australia	v	Western Australia (home team)
192 (73.5 overs); Nathan McAndrew 50* (48); Aaron Hardie 3/11 (8.5 overs)		204 (66.5 overs); Hilton Cartwright 40 (60); Nathan McAndrew 3/39 (14.5 overs)
212 (61.4 overs); Ben Manenti 66 (88); Lance Morris 3/44 (14.4 overs)		8/201 (61.5 overs); Jayden Goodwin 47* (72); Brendan Doggett 4/61 (20 overs)

Western Australia won by 2 wickets
WACA Ground, Perth
Umpires: Sam Nogajski and Claire Polosak
Player of the match: Jayden Goodwin (Western Australia)

- Western Australia won the toss and elected to field.
- Points: Western Australia 7.04, South Australia 1.00

16–19 November 2023
Scorecard

(home team) Victoria	v	Queensland
7/300d (128 overs); Marcus Harris 73 (212); Jack Wildermuth 3/49 (27 overs)		219 (98.1 overs); Jack Wildermuth 40 (67); Scott Boland 4/47 (25 overs)
9/190d (57 overs); Will Sutherland 66 (77); Liam Guthrie 6/60 (13 overs)		158 (81.5 overs); Bryce Street 46 (134); Will Sutherland 4/32 (19 overs)

Victoria won by 113 runs
Melbourne Cricket Ground, Melbourne
Umpires: Gerard Abood and Eloise Sheridan
Player of the match: Will Sutherland (Victoria)

- Queensland won the toss and elected to field.
- Doug Warren (Victoria) made his first class debut.
- Points: Victoria 7.07, Queensland 0.69

18–20 November 2023
Scorecard

New South Wales	v	Tasmania (home team)
181 (42 overs); Oliver Davies 67 (65); Gabe Bell 4/29 (12 overs)		493 (131 overs); Bradley Hope 132* (146); Jackson Bird 3/102 (28 overs)
311 (110.5 overs); Oliver Davies 62 (93); Lawrence Neil-Smith 3/57 (20 overs)

Tasmania won by an innings and 1 run
Bellerive Oval, Hobart
Umpires: Simon Lightbody and Bruce Oxenford
Player of the match: Bradley Hope (Tasmania)

- Tasmania won the toss and elected to field.
- Bradley Hope (Tasmania) scored his maiden century in first-class cricket.
- Points: Tasmania 8.91, New South Wales 0.80

=== Round 6 ===
28 November–1 December 2023
Scorecard

Victoria	v	South Australia (home team)
278 (60.3 overs); Sam Harper 151 (104); Wes Agar 5/45 (16.3 overs)		252 (70.2 overs); Jake Fraser-McGurk 101 (106); Fergus O'Neill 5/28 (18.2 overs)
231 (88.3 overs); Will Pucovski 65 (175); Nathan McAndrew 4/50 (21 overs)		234 (61.4 overs); Alex Carey 81 (116); Fergus O'Neill 5/83 (21 overs)

Victoria won by 23 runs
Adelaide Oval, Adelaide
Umpires: Michael Graham-Smith and Nathan Johnstone
Player of the match: Sam Harper (Victoria)

- South Australia won the toss and elected to field.
- Only 43 overs were possible on Day 1 due to rain.
- Jake Fraser-McGurk (South Australia) scored his maiden century in first-class cricket.
- Fergus O'Neill (Victoria) took his maiden five-wicket haul in first-class cricket.
- Points: South Australia 1.52, Victoria 7.78

28–30 November 2023
Scorecard

(home team) New South Wales	v	Tasmania
224 (63.5 overs); Oliver Davies 81 (115); Lawrence Neil-Smith 7/58 (20.5 overs)		200 (52.4 overs); Mitchell Owen 70 (55); Chris Tremain 3/40 (14.4 overs)
118 (34.2 overs); Ryan Hackney 31 (45); Gabe Bell 5/26 (9.2 overs)		68 (22.1 overs); Jake Doran 29 (31); Chris Tremain 6/31 (10 overs)

New South Wales won by 74 runs
Sydney Cricket Ground, Sydney
Umpires: Phillip Gillespie and Ben Treloar
Player of the match: Chris Tremain (New South Wales)

- Tasmania won the toss and elected to field.
- Sam Konstas (New South Wales) made his first-class debut.
- Gabe Bell (Tasmania) took his maiden five-wicket haul in first-class cricket.
- Points: New South Wales 7.24, Tasmania 1.00

28 November–1 December 2023
Scorecard

(home team) Queensland	v	Western Australia
8/274d (108 overs); Usman Khawaja 102* (215); Jhye Richardson 4/36 (23 overs)		330 (95.4 overs); Hilton Cartwright 132 (230); Gurinder Sandhu 5/77 (26.4 overs)
3/137 (62 overs); Joe Burns 62* (175); Jhye Richardson 1/27 (11 overs)

Match drawn
The Gabba, Brisbane
Umpires: Donovan Koch and Bruce Oxenford
Player of the match: Hilton Cartwright (Western Australia)

- Western Australia won the toss and elected to field.
- Only 28 overs were possible on Day 1 due to rain.
- Joel Curtis (Western Australia) made his first-class debut.
- Points: Queensland 2.29, Western Australia 3.00

=== Round 7 ===
3–6 February 2024
Scorecard

South Australia	v	Victoria (home team)
173 (70.3 overs); Ben Manenti 47* (62); Mitchell Perry 3/43 (15 overs)		288 (88.3 overs); Nic Maddinson 104 (182); Liam Scott 4/18 (12.3 overs)
271 (83.2 overs); Harry Nielsen 67 (91); Fergus O'Neill 5/47 (20.2 overs)		7/157 (44.3 overs); Campbell Kellaway 35* (101); Brendan Doggett 3/41 (11 overs)

Victoria won by 3 wickets
Junction Oval, Melbourne
Umpires: Greg Davidson and Simon Lightbody
Player of the match: Nic Maddinson (Victoria)

- Victoria won the toss and elected to field.
- Points: Victoria 7.88, South Australia 1.00

3–6 February 2024
Scorecard

(home team) Queensland	v	Tasmania
282 (84.4 overs); Ben McDermott 146* (218); Gabe Bell 4/40 (14 overs)		219 (59.4 overs); Charlie Wakim 39 (66); Mark Steketee 4/58 (14.4 overs)
160 (57.2 overs); Jack Clayton 102 (181); Gabe Bell 6/39 (19 overs)		6/228 (56.3 overs); Jordan Silk 84* (158); Gurinder Sandhu 2/47 (14 overs)

Tasmania won by 4 wickets
The Gabba, Brisbane
Umpires: Shawn Craig and Andrew Crozier
Player of the match: Gabe Bell (Tasmania)

- Queensland won the toss and elected to bat.
- Angus Lovell (Queensland) made his first-class debut.
- Gabe Bell (Tasmania) took his maiden ten-wicket match haul in first-class cricket.
- Points: Tasmania 7.19, Queensland 1.82

3–6 February 2024
Scorecard

(home team) Western Australia	v	New South Wales
256 (88 overs); Sam Whiteman 107 (188); Chris Green 3/33 (16 overs)		251 (99.4 overs); Moises Henriques 95 (210); Corey Rocchiccioli 4/101 (33.4 overs)
176 (56.5 overs); Cameron Bancroft 36 (108); Chris Green 6/83 (20 overs)		6/182 (59.3 overs); Daniel Hughes 59 (137); Corey Rocchiccioli 3/104 (26.3 overs)

New South Wales won by 4 wickets
WACA Ground, Perth
Umpires: Nathan Johnstone and Ben Trealor
Player of the match: Chris Green (New South Wales)

- New South Wales won the toss and elected to field.
- Points: New South Wales 7.51, Western Australia 1.56

=== Round 8 ===
16–19 February 2024
Scorecard

(home team) New South Wales	v	Victoria
252 (86.5 overs); Jack Edwards 99 (166); Will Sutherland 5/51 (17 overs)		6/454d (141.5 overs); Will Pucovski 131 (302); Nathan Lyon 5/153 (52 overs)
8/116 (49 overs); Sam Konstas 35 (97); Scott Boland 5/41 (14 overs)

Match drawn
Sydney Cricket Ground, Sydney
Umpires: Shawn Craig and Greg Davidson
Player of the match: Scott Boland (Victoria)

- Victoria won the toss and elected to field.
- Only 72.4 overs on Day 3 and 26.1 overs on Day 4 were possible due to rain.
- Points: Victoria 2.94, New South Wales 1.72

16–19 February 2024
Scorecard

(home team) Tasmania	v	Western Australia
183 (49 overs); Bradley Hope 63 (98); Joel Paris 4/48 (13 overs)		271 (89.3 overs); Jayden Goodwin 85 (185); Beau Webster 3/30 (15.3 overs)
8/537d (135 overs); Caleb Jewell 227 (319); Joel Paris 3/76 (25 overs)		2/242 (71.4 overs); Cameron Green 103* (142); Beau Webster 1/26 (10 overs)

Match drawn
Bellerive Oval, Hobart
Umpires: Gerard Abood and Ben Treloar
Player of the match: Caleb Jewell (Tasmania)

- Western Australia won the toss and elected to field.
- Kieran Elliott (Tasmania) made his first-class debut.
- Points: Tasmania 2.00, Western Australia 2.71

16–19 February 2024
Scorecard

(home team) South Australia	v	Queensland
132 (40.3 overs); Jake Lehmann 52 (93); Mark Steketee 3/50 (9 overs)		159 (50.5 overs); Marnus Labuschagne 38 (112); Nathan McAndrew 3/25 (9.5 overs)
232 (72 overs); Alex Carey 90 (116); Mark Steketee 3/39 (12 overs)		3/206 (63.3 overs); Jack Clayton 54* (133); Jordan Buckingham 2/39 (14 overs)

Queensland won by 7 wickets
Adelaide Oval, Adelaide
Umpires: Nathan Johnstone and Bruce Oxenford
Player of the match: Mark Steketee (Queensland)

- South Australia won the toss and elected to bat.
- Kyle Brazell (South Australia) made his first-class debut.
- Points: Queensland 7.00, South Australia 1.00

=== Round 9 ===
1–4 March 2024
Scorecard

South Australia	v	New South Wales (home team)
287 (99.2 overs); Thomas Kelly 54 (94); Jack Nisbet 3/50 (18.2 overs)		8/510d (144 overs); Oliver Davies 116 (166); Nathan McAndrew 3/63 (30 overs)
9/259 (92.4 overs); Thomas Kelly 69 (134); Jack Edwards 4/59 (17 overs)

Match drawn
Cricket Central, Sydney
Umpires: Phillip Gillespie and Donovan Koch
Player of the match: Daniel Hughes (New South Wales)

- New South Wales won the toss and elected to field.
- Points: South Australia 2.37, New South Wales 3.33

1–4 March 2024
Scorecard

(home team) Tasmania	v	Victoria
240 (65.3 overs); Jake Doran 47 (67); Will Sutherland 5/73 (15.3 overs)		106 (32.2 overs); Will Pucovski 22 (29); Gabe Bell 4/21 (11.2 overs)
307 (74.5 overs); Beau Webster 167* (180); Fergus O'Neill 3/75 (19 overs)		384 (105.1 overs); Nic Maddinson 109 (145); Iain Carlisle 4/68 (21.1 overs)

Tasmania won by 57 runs
Bellerive Oval, Hobart
Umpires: Michael Graham-Smith and Sam Nogajski
Player of the match: Beau Webster (Tasmania)

- Victoria won the toss and elected to field.
- Beau Webster and Riley Meredith had a partnership of 153 runs in the second innings, a record 10th-wicket partnership for Tasmania.
- Will Pucovski was replaced by Campbell Kellaway during the match after sustaining a concussion.
- Points: Tasmania 7.4, Victoria 1.00

1–4 March 2024
Scorecard

(home team) Western Australia	v	Queensland
310 (102 overs); Jayden Goodwin 115 (268); Xavier Bartlett 5/64 (26 overs)		170 (54.5 overs); Jack Wildermuth 41 (55); Corey Rocchiccioli 4/54 (14 overs)
7/307d (83 overs); Josh Inglis 136* (165); Jack Wildermuth 2/47 (14 overs)		301 (96.1 overs); Jack Wildermuth 91 (133); Corey Rocchiccioli 4/109 (33 overs)

Western Australia won by 146 runs
WACA Ground, Perth
Umpires: Bruce Oxenford and Paul Wilson
Player of the match: Josh Inglis (Western Australia)

- Queensland won the toss and elected to field.
- Jayden Goodwin (Western Australia) scored his maiden century in first-class cricket.
- Points: Western Australia 8.00, Queensland 0.9

=== Round 10 ===
11–14 March 2024
Scorecard

South Australia	v	Tasmania (home team)
271 (77.2 overs); Nathan McSweeney 117 (174); Kieran Elliott 3/65 (14.2 overs)		123 (36.2 overs); Jake Doran 52 (77); Nathan McAndrew 6/44 (15.2 overs)
175 (59.1 overs); Harry Nielsen 53 (87); Iain Carlisle 3/42 (15 overs)		189 (45.2 overs); Beau Webster 68 (76); Jordan Buckingham 5/65 (15.4 overs)

South Australia won by 134 runs
Bellerive Oval, Hobart
Umpires: Gerard Abood and Donovan Koch
Player of the match: Nathan McSweeney (South Australia)

- Tasmania won the toss and elected to field.
- Points: South Australia 7.71, Tasmania 1.00

11–14 March 2024
Scorecard

Western Australia	v	Victoria (home team)
244 (83.1 overs); Jayden Goodwin 43 (117); Scott Boland 4/41 (19 overs)		144 (43 overs); Matthew Short 53 (69); Cameron Gannon 5/42 (12 overs)
168 (66.4 overs); Cameron Bancroft 58 (166); Scott Boland 4/51 (20.4 overs)		130 (42.1 overs); Campbell Kellaway 53 (136); Liam Haskett 3/12 (8.1 overs)

Western Australia won by 138 runs
Junction Oval, Melbourne
Umpires: Phillip Gillespie and Michael Graham-Smith
Player of the match: Cameron Gannon (Western Australia)

- Victoria won the toss and elected to field.
- Points: Western Australia 7.44, Victoria 1.00

11–14 March 2024
Scorecard

(home team) Queensland	v	New South Wales
144 (48.1 overs); Xavier Bartlett 70 (75); Chris Tremain 6/20 (15.1 overs)		316 (88.3 overs); Oliver Davies 131 (147); Mitchell Swepson 3/76 (25 overs)
301 (84.3 overs); Xavier Bartlett 69 (109); Tanveer Sangha 4/116 (33 overs)		5/133 (28.2 overs); Daniel Hughes 54 (31); Callum Vidler 3/38 (7.2 overs)

New South Wales won by 5 wickets
Allan Border Field, Brisbane
Umpires: Shawn Craig and Sam Nogajski
Player of the match: Oliver Davies (New South Wales)

- New South Wales won the toss and elected to field.
- Callum Vidler (Queensland) made his first-class debut.
- Sam Konstas was replaced by Kurtis Patterson during the match after sustaining a concussion.
- Points: New South Wales 8.16, Queensland 1.00

== Final ==
21–25 March 2024
Scorecard

Western Australia	v	Tasmania
347 (102.1 overs); Sam Whiteman 104 (154); Iain Carlisle 3/65 (18.1 overs)		186 (92 overs); Caleb Jewell 45 (116); Corey Rocchiccioli 4/48 (28 overs)
376 (124.5 overs); Hilton Cartwright 94 (206); Iain Carlisle 3/58 (17 overs)		160 (41 overs); Jordan Silk 46 (59); Cameron Gannon 5/23 (11 overs)

Western Australia won by 377 runs
Western Australia Cricket Association Ground, Perth
Umpires: Shawn Craig and Sam Nogajski
Player of the match: Sam Whiteman (Western Australia)

- Tasmania won the toss and elected to field.
- Cooper Connolly (Western Australia) made his first-class debut.

== Statistics ==
=== Most runs ===
Player	Team	Mat	Inns	NO	Runs	Ave	HS	100	50
Beau Webster	Tasmania	11	19	3	938	58.62	167*	3	6
Cameron Bancroft	Western Australia	10	17	1	778	48.62	122	3	4
Sam Whiteman	Western Australia	11	19	0	770	40.52	188	3	2
Nathan McSweeney	South Australia	10	20	1	762	40.10	117	3	3
Charlie Wakim	Tasmania	11	21	0	679	32.33	148	2	2

=== Most wickets ===
Player	Team	Mat	Inns	Overs	Wkts	Ave	Econ	BBI	BBM	5	10
Chris Tremain	New South Wales	10	18	318.4	50	15.90	2.49	6/20	9/63	3	0
Nathan McAndrew	South Australia	9	17	317.0	48	18.58	2.81	6/41	10/61	4	1
Corey Rocchiccioli	Western Australia	11	21	437.0	46	27.60	2.90	4/48	8/163	0	0
Gabe Bell	Tasmania	9	16	299.2	42	19.90	2.79	6/39	10/79	2	1
Fergus O'Neill	Victoria	9	17	292.0	40	17.25	2.36	5/28	10/111	3	1

== See also ==
- 2023–24 Marsh One-Day Cup
