= 2022–23 Marsh One-Day Cup =

Cricket tournament

- Dates: 23 September 2022 – 8 March 2023
- Administrator: Cricket Australia
- Cricket format: List A
- Tournament format: Round-robin tournament
- Host(s): Adelaide; Brisbane; Hobart; Launceston; Melbourne; Perth; Sydney
- Champions: Western Australia (16th title)
- Participants: 6
- Matches: 22
- Player of the series: Josh Philippe (WA)
- Most runs: Daniel Hughes (NSW) (548)
- Most wickets: Tom Rogers (TAS) (20)

The 2022–23 Marsh One-Day Cup was the 54th season of the official List A domestic cricket competition played in Australia.

In the final, Western Australia beat South Australia by 181 runs to win their 16th one-day title, and the second of three titles won consecutively from 2021–22 to 2023–24.

== Points table ==
Pos	Team	Pld	W	L	T	NR	BP	Ded	Pts	NRR
1	Western Australia	7	7	0	0	0	2	0	30	1.039
2	South Australia	7	4	3	0	0	2	0	18	0.141
3	Victoria	7	3	4	0	0	1	0	13	−0.343
4	Queensland	7	3	4	0	0	1	0	13	−0.530
5	New South Wales	7	2	5	0	0	2	0	10	0.157
6	Tasmania	7	2	5	0	0	2	0	10	−0.400

Source: Cricket Australia
- Qualified to the final

RESULT POINTS:

- Win – 4
- Tie – 2 each
- No Result – 2 each
- Loss – 0
- Bonus Point – 1 (run rate 1.25 times that of opposition)

== Fixtures ==
23 September 2022
10:05
Scorecard

New South Wales; 7/277 (50 overs)	v	Victoria (H); 3/158 (29 overs)
Daniel Hughes 117 (128); Todd Murphy 2/29 (10 overs)		Will Pucovski 64 (75); Will Salzmann 1/17 (3 overs)

Victoria won by 3 runs (DLS method)
Junction Oval, Melbourne
Umpires: Claire Polosak and Phillip Gillespie
Player of the match: Daniel Hughes (New South Wales)

- Victoria won the toss and elected to field.
- Victoria innings curtailed at 29 overs due to bad light; DLS par score was 155.
- Will Salzmann (New South Wales) made his List A debut.

25 September 2022
10:05
Scorecard

(H) Victoria; 9/274 (50 overs)	v	Western Australia; 5/277 (47.4 overs)
Peter Handscomb 93 (110); Andrew Tye 4/54 (10 overs)		Josh Philippe 100 (96); Jonathan Merlo 2/47 (8 overs)

Western Australia won by 5 wickets
Junction Oval, Melbourne
Umpires: Phillip Gillespie and Shawn Craig
Player of the match: Josh Philippe (Western Australia)

- Victoria won the toss and elected to bat.

26 September 2022
14:05 (D/N)
Scorecard

South Australia; 8/278 (50 overs)	v	Queensland (H); 217 (46.5 overs)
Ben Manenti 60 (45); Matt Renshaw 2/30 (6 overs)		Sam Truloff 49 (79); Henry Thornton 3/55 (10 overs)

South Australia won by 61 runs
Allan Border Field, Brisbane
Umpires: Bruce Oxenford and Sharad Patel
Player of the match: Ben Manenti (South Australia)

- Queensland won the toss and elected to field.

28 September 2022
14:05 (D/N)
Scorecard

(H) South Australia; 220 (44.1 overs)	v	Tasmania; 2/221 (32.5 overs)
Alex Carey 59 (45); Tom Rogers 5/32 (10 overs)		Caleb Jewell 126* (97); Ben Manenti 2/44 (9 overs)

Tasmania won by 8 wickets
Allan Border Field, Brisbane
Umpires: Donovan Koch and Stephen Dionysius
Player of the match: Tom Rogers (Tasmania)

- South Australia won the toss and elected to bat.

30 September 2022
14:05 (D/N)
Scorecard

(H) Queensland; 164 (44.1 overs)	v	Tasmania; 4/168 (31.2 overs)
Mark Steketee 35* (36); Riley Meredith 5/26 (10 overs)		Ben McDermott 70 (83); Michael Neser 2/38 (8.2 overs)

Tasmania won by 6 wickets
Allan Border Field, Brisbane
Umpires: Sam Nogajski and Troy Penman
Player of the match: Riley Meredith (Tasmania)

- Tasmania won the toss and elected to field.

1 October 2022
10:05
Scorecard

New South Wales; 76 (21.4 overs)	v	Western Australia (H); 1/77 (17 overs)
Daniel Sams 26 (31); Jhye Richardson 4/24 (8 overs)		Josh Philippe 37* (46); Liam Hatcher 1/25 (3 overs)

Western Australia won by 9 wickets
WACA Ground, Perth
Umpires: Michael Graham-Smith and Nathan Johnstone
Player of the match: Jhye Richardson (Western Australia)

- New South Wales won the toss and elected to bat.
- New South Wales were dismissed for their lowest-ever total in one-day domestic cricket in Australia.

21 October 2022
10:00
Scorecard

Tasmania; 5/252 (50 overs)	v	South Australia (H); 6/255 (47.4 overs)
Jake Doran 105* (128); Nathan McAndrew 1/27 (9 overs)		Jake Lehmann 78* (64); Tom Rogers 3/44 (9 overs)

South Australia won by 4 wickets
Adelaide Oval, Adelaide
Umpires: Bruce Oxenford and Eloise Sheridan
Player of the match: Nathan McSweeney (South Australia)

- South Australia won the toss and elected to field.

22 October 2022
10:00
Scorecard

(H) Victoria; 6/244 (36 overs)	v	Western Australia; 7/247 (35.2 overs)
Matthew Short 75 (59); Andrew Tye 3/46 (7 overs)		Josh Philippe 81 (50); Will Sutherland 2/43 (7 overs)

Western Australia won by 3 wickets
Junction Oval, Melbourne
Umpires: Shawn Craig and Nathan Johnstone
Player of the match: Josh Philippe (Western Australia)

- Western Australia won the toss and elected to field.
- The match was reduced to 36 overs per side due to rain.

26 October 2022
14:00 (D/N)
Scorecard

Victoria; 7/265 (50 overs)	v	Tasmania (H); 9/248 (50 overs)
Marcus Harris 142* (139); Beau Webster 2/23 (5 overs)		Jake Doran 104 (131); Scott Boland 3/38 (10 overs)

Victoria won by 17 runs
University of Tasmania Stadium, Launceston
Umpires: Michael Graham-Smith and David Taylor
Player of the match: Marcus Harris (Victoria)

- Tasmania won the toss and elected to field.
- Tim Ward (Tasmania) made his List A debut.

5 November 2022
10:00
Scorecard

South Australia; 5/330 (50 overs)	v	New South Wales (H); 322 (49.1 overs)
Nathan McSweeney 94 (113); Liam Hatcher 2/40 (7 overs)		Daniel Hughes 139 (127); Henry Thornton 3/67 (10 overs)

South Australia won by 8 runs
North Sydney Oval, Sydney
Umpires: Sam Nogajski and Ben Treloar
Player of the match: Nathan McSweeney (South Australia)

- New South Wales won the toss and elected to field.

5 November 2022
10:00
Scorecard

(H) Western Australia; 236 (47.2 overs)	v	Queensland; 231 (49.4 overs)
Josh Philippe 73 (94); Michael Neser 5/28 (9.2 overs)		Matt Renshaw 104 (114); Matthew Kelly 3/34 (9.4 overs)

Western Australia won by 5 runs
WACA Ground, Perth
Umpires: Shawn Craig and Simon Lightbody
Player of the match: Matt Renshaw (Western Australia)

- Queensland won the toss and elected to field.

15 November 2022
10:05
Scorecard

Victoria; 171 (47 overs)	v	Queensland (H); 3/173 (36 overs)
Campbell Kellaway 34 (61); Mark Steketee 3/30 (9 overs)		Sam Truloff 55 (79); Scott Boland 1/22 (8 overs)

Queensland won by 7 wickets
Allan Border Field, Brisbane
Umpires: Gerard Abood and Phillip Gillespie
Player of the match: Mark Steketee (Queensland)

- Queensland won the toss and elected to field.
- Campbell Kellaway (Victoria) made his List A debut.

16 November 2022
10:00
Scorecard

South Australia; 6/266 (50 overs)	v	Western Australia (H); 8/270 (48.3 overs)
Henry Hunt 103 (137); Andrew Tye 2/53 (10 overs)		Josh Inglis 85 (70); Henry Thornton 3/57 (10 overs)

Western Australia won by 2 wickets
WACA Ground, Perth
Umpires: Bruce Oxenford and Michael Graham-Smith
Player of the match: Josh Inglis (Western Australia)

- Western Australia won the toss and elected to field.
- Henry Hunt (South Australia) scored his maiden century in List A cricket.

17 November 2022
11:00
Scorecard

New South Wales; 8/300 (50 overs)	v	Tasmania (H); 140 (28.1 overs)
Daniel Hughes 101 (114); Nathan Ellis 3/54 (10 overs)		Matthew Wade 42 (49); Chris Green 4/20 (9 overs)

New South Wales won by 160 runs
Blundstone Arena, Hobart
Umpires: Donovan Koch and Greg Davidson
Player of the match: Daniel Hughes (New South Wales)

- Tasmania won the toss and elected to field.

27 November 2022
14:05 (D/N)
Scorecard

Queensland; 5/298 (43.2 overs)	v	New South Wales (H); 8/165 (19.5 overs)
Max Bryant 88* (53); Chris Tremain 3/46 (8 overs)		Daniel Hughes 43 (40); Blake Edwards 3/30 (3.5 overs)

Queensland won by 31 runs (DLS method)
North Sydney Oval, Sydney
Umpires: Ben Treloar and Gerard Abood
Player of the match: Max Bryant (Queensland)

- New South Wales won the toss and elected to field.
- Queensland innings curtailed at 43.2 overs due to rain.
- New South Wales innings curtailed at 19.5 overs due to rain; DLS par score was 196.
- Blake Edwards and Jack Clayton (both Queensland) made their List A debuts.

14 February 2023
14:05 (D/N)
Scorecard

Queensland; 202 (46.2 overs)	v	Victoria (H); 1/205 (31 overs)
Sam Heazlett 100 (135); Fergus O'Neill 4/22 (10 overs)		Matthew Short 108* (94); Will Prestwidge 1/49 (4 overs)

Victoria won by 9 wickets
Melbourne Cricket Ground, Melbourne
Umpires: Shawn Craig and Troy Penman
Player of the match: Fergus O'Neill (Victoria)

- Queensland won the toss and elected to bat.
- Jack Sinfield (Queensland) made his List A debut.

15 February 2023
13:35 (D/N)
Scorecard

(H) South Australia; 210 (47.3 overs)	v	Western Australia; 3/212 (38.2 overs)
Ben Manenti 61 (39); Jason Behrendorff 3/36 (9.3 overs)		Cameron Bancroft 80* (88); Wes Agar 2/33 (8 overs)

Western Australia won by 7 wickets
Adelaide Oval, Adelaide
Umpires: Stephen Dionysius and Simon Lightbody
Player of the match: Cameron Bancroft (Western Australia)

- Western Australia won the toss and elected to field.

16 February 2023
14:05
Scorecard

(H) New South Wales; 291 (49.5 overs)	v	Tasmania; 189 (40 overs)
Daniel Hughes 126 (130); Nathan Ellis 4/59 (9.5 overs)		Mac Wright 32 (60); Adam Zampa 3/45 (9 overs)

New South Wales won by 102 runs
North Sydney Oval, Sydney
Umpires: Greg Davidson and David Taylor
Player of the match: Daniel Hughes (New South Wales)

- New South Wales won the toss and elected to bat.

26 February 2023
10:00
Scorecard

Victoria; 136 (42.3 overs)	v	South Australia (H); 2/137 (26 overs)
James Seymour 51 (75); Nathan McAndrew 3/22 (9 overs)		Henry Hunt 63 (70); Ruwantha Kellepotha 2/43 (7 overs)

South Australia won by 8 wickets
Adelaide Oval, Adelaide
Umpires: Donovan Koch and Simon Lightbody
Player of the match: Nathan McAndrew (South Australia)

- South Australia won the toss and elected to field.
- Daniel Drew (South Australia) and Tom Rogers (Victoria) both made their List A debuts.

26 February 2023
11:00
Scorecard

(H) Tasmania; 6/285 (48.4 overs)	v	Western Australia; 4/190 (21.2 overs)
Caleb Jewell 104 (117); Jason Behrendorff 2/42 (9.4 overs)		Josh Philippe 85 (48); Tom Andrews 2/41 (5 overs)

Western Australia won by 6 wickets
Blundstone Arena, Hobart
Umpires: Sam Nogajski and Sharad Patel
Player of the match: Josh Philippe (Western Australia)

- Tasmania won the toss and elected to bat.
- Tasmania innings curtailed at 48.4 overs due to rain.
- Western Australia innings reduced to 24 overs due to rain; target was 190.
- Iain Carlisle (Tasmania) made his List A debut.

26 February 2023
13:05 (D/N)
Scorecard

(H) Queensland; 272 (49.5 overs)	v	New South Wales; 269 (49.5 overs)
Jack Clayton 56 (67); Liam Hatcher 6/58 (10 overs)		Moises Henriques 59 (69); Liam Guthrie 3/42 (10 overs)

Queensland won by 3 runs
The Gabba, Brisbane
Umpires: Ben Treloar and Bruce Oxenford
Player of the match: Liam Hatcher (New South Wales)

- Queensland won the toss and elected to bat.
- Josh Brown, Patrick Dooley, Steve McGiffin and Tom Whitney (Queensland) all made their List A debuts.

== Final ==
8 March 2023
12:05
Scorecard

(H) Western Australia; 7/387 (50 overs)	v	South Australia; 206 (31.4 overs)
Josh Inglis 138 (110); Wes Agar 2/56 (10 overs)		Henry Hunt 50 (55); Ashton Agar 5/64 (9.4 overs)

Western Australia won by 181 runs
WACA Ground, Perth
Umpires: Gerard Abood and Sam Nogajski
Player of the match: Josh Inglis (Western Australia)

- South Australia won the toss and elected to field.
- Josh Inglis (Western Australia) scored his maiden List A century.

== Statistics ==
=== Most runs ===
Player	Team	Mat	Inns	NO	Runs	Ave	HS	100	50
Daniel Hughes	New South Wales	7	7	0	548	78.28	139	4	0
Josh Philippe	Western Australia	8	8	1	438	62.57	100	1	4
Jake Doran	Tasmania	7	6	2	335	83.75	105*	2	0
Cameron Bancroft	Western Australia	8	7	2	327	65.4	90	0	3
Caleb Jewell	Tasmania	7	7	1	317	52.83	126*	2	0

=== Most wickets ===
Player	Team	Mat	Overs	Runs	Wkts	Ave	BBI	SR	4WI
Tom Rogers	Tasmania	7	61.1	340	20	17	5/32	18.35	2
Andrew Tye	Western Australia	6	47.4	241	14	17.21	4/54	20.42	1
Henry Thornton	South Australia	8	61.5	402	14	28.71	3/55	26.5	0
Jason Behrendorff	Western Australia	8	66.1	308	12	25.66	3/17	33.08	0
Michael Neser	Queensland	4	37.4	166	11	15.09	5/28	20.54	1

== Television coverage ==
Every match of the 2022-23 Marsh Cup were streamed live by Cricket Australia through their website and the CA Live app. Kayo Sports also streamed all 22 matches from the tournament. Fox Cricket broadcast 13 matches, including the final.
