= 2022–23 Sheffield Shield season =

Cricket tournament

2022–23 Sheffield Shield
- Dates: 3 October 2022 – 27 March 2023
- Administrator: Cricket Australia
- Cricket format: First-class
- Tournament format(s): Double round-robin and final
- Champions: Western Australia (17th title)
- Participants: 6
- Matches: 31
- Player of the series: Michael Neser (Queensland)
- Most runs: Cameron Bancroft (Western Australia) (945)
- Most wickets: Will Sutherland (Victoria) (41)

The 2022–23 Sheffield Shield season was the 121st of the Australian inter-state domestic first-class cricket competition. In June 2022 Cricket Australia revealed the return of the traditional home and away format after two seasons disrupted by the pandemic. The tournament started in October 2022 with Western Australia the defending champions. Finishing the regular season atop the standings, Western Australia hosted the final at the WACA Ground in Perth, defeating Victoria by nine wickets on 26 March 2023 to retain the title.

== Points table ==
Pos	Team	Pld	W	L	D	A	BP	DP	Pts
1	Western Australia	10	6	2	2	0	13.60	0	51.60
2	Victoria	10	5	2	3	0	13.71	0	46.71
3	Queensland	10	4	2	4	0	13.69	0	41.69
4	South Australia	10	2	4	4	0	14.88	2	28.88
5	Tasmania	10	2	4	4	0	12.30	0	28.30
6	New South Wales	10	0	5	5	0	13.31	2	16.31

== Round-Robin stage ==
=== Round 1 ===
3−6 October 2022
Scorecard

New South Wales	v	Western Australia (home team)
180 (75 overs); Kurtis Patterson 72* (149); Lance Morris 5/36 (18 overs)		258 (105 overs); Teague Wyllie 104 (204); Ben Dwarshuis 4/48 (20 overs)
162 (56.1 overs); Baxter Holt 54 (78); Lance Morris 4/46 (12.1 overs)		2/85 (24.5 overs); Cameron Bancroft 34 (42); Nathan Lyon 2/33 (4.5 overs)

Western Australia won by 8 wickets
WACA Ground, Perth
Umpires: Gerard Abood and Michael Graham-Smith
Player of the match: Lance Morris (Western Australia)

- Western Australia won the toss and elected to field.
- Ben Dwarshuis (New South Wales) and Sam Fanning (Western Australia) both made their first-class debuts.
- Teague Wyllie (Western Australia) scored his maiden century in first-class cricket.
- Points: Western Australia 7.48, New South Wales 0.7

6−9 October 2022
Scorecard

Tasmania	v	Queensland (home team)
147 (60.2 overs); Jarrod Freeman 44 (65); Mark Steketee 4/43 (17 overs)		458 (153.4 overs); Marnus Labuschagne 127 (234); Riley Meredith 5/96 (30.4 overs)
139 (53 overs); Caleb Jewell 29 (50); Gurinder Sandhu 5/41 (17 overs)

Queensland won by an innings and 172 runs
Allan Border Field, Brisbane
Umpires: Nathan Johnstone and Bruce Oxenford
Player of the match: Gurinder Sandhu (Queensland)

- Queensland won the toss and elected to field.
- Points: Queensland 7.82, Tasmania 0.4

6−9 October 2022
Scorecard

Victoria	v	South Australia (home team)
310 (100 overs); Will Sutherland 100 (168); David Grant 4/82 (20 overs)		230 (71.5 overs); Travis Head 76 (136); Will Sutherland 4/45 (15.5 overs)
7/344d (92 overs); Peter Handscomb 132 (183); Jordan Buckingham 4/78 (21 overs)		7/207 (107.4 overs); Henry Hunt 97* (326); Fergus O'Neill 2/24 (17 overs)

Match drawn
Karen Rolton Oval, Adelaide
Umpires: Greg Davidson and Ben Treloar
Player of the match: Will Sutherland (Victoria)

- South Australia won the toss and elected to field.
- Fergus O'Neill (Victoria) made his first-class debut.
- Points: Victoria 3.1, South Australia 2.3

=== Round 2 ===
16−19 October 2022
Scorecard

(home team) South Australia	v	Tasmania
227 (76.1 overs); Jake Lehmann 73 (105); Jackson Bird 4/51 (18 overs); Peter Siddle 4/51 (18 overs)		245 (96.4 overs); Tim Ward 82 (219); Wes Agar 4/34 (19 overs)
252 (73.5 overs); Ben Manenti 85* (96); Beau Webster 4/39 (11.5 overs)		3/235 (73.3 overs); Caleb Jewell 108* (213); Jordan Buckingham 1/27 (16 overs)

Tasmania won by 7 wickets
Adelaide Oval, Adelaide
Umpires: Gerard Abood and Bruce Oxenford
Player of the match: Peter Siddle (Tasmania)

- South Australia won the toss and elected to bat.
- Points: Tasmania 7.45, South Australia 1.27

17−20 October 2022
Scorecard

Western Australia	v	Victoria (home team)
466 (145.2 overs); Cameron Bancroft 100 (201); Todd Murphy 3/104 (35 overs)		4/616d (168 overs); Peter Handscomb 281* (367); Aaron Hardie 2/87 (26 overs)
5/185 (56 overs); Hilton Cartwright 76* (137); Todd Murphy 3/42 (16 overs)

Match drawn
Junction Oval, Melbourne
Umpires: Shawn Craig and Nathan Johnstone
Player of the match: Peter Handscomb (Victoria)

- Western Australia won the toss and elected to bat.
- Points: Western Australia 2.45, Victoria 2.38

18−21 October 2022
Scorecard

(home team) New South Wales	v	Queensland
246 (80.3 overs); Matthew Gilkes 72 (121); Mitchell Swepson 3/53 (19 overs)		6/477d (149 overs); Matt Renshaw 200* (403); Sean Abbott 3/98 (30 overs)
256 (115.1 overs); Moises Henriques 99* (280); Mitchell Swepson 5/113 (44.1 overs)		0/10 (2 overs); Matt Renshaw 7* (4)

Match drawn
Drummoyne Oval, Sydney
Umpires: Greg Davidson and Simon Lightbody
Player of the match: Matt Renshaw (Queensland)

- Queensland won the toss and elected to field.
- Points: Queensland 2.2, New South Wales 1.96

=== Round 3 ===
29 October−1 November 2022
Scorecard

Victoria	v	Tasmania (home team)
7/351d (130 overs); Ashley Chandrasinghe 119 (333); Peter Siddle 3/61 (30 overs)		535 (128.1 overs); Jordan Silk 154 (161); Mitchell Perry 4/112 (25.1 overs)
1/122 (68.5 overs); Travis Dean 70* (200); Riley Meredith 1/43 (13 overs)

Match drawn
Blundstone Arena, Hobart
Umpires: David Taylor and Michael Graham-Smith
Player of the match: Jordan Silk (Tasmania)

- Tasmania won the toss and elected to field.
- Ashley Chandrasinghe (Victoria) made his first-class debut.
- Ashley Chandrasinghe (Victoria) scored his maiden century in first-class cricket.
- Points: Tasmania 2.46, Victoria 1.83

31 October−3 November 2022
Scorecard

(home team) New South Wales	v	South Australia
5/389d (120 overs); Kurtis Patterson 122* (175); Wes Agar 2/69 (24 overs)		311 (93.1 overs); Alex Carey 64 (74); Ben Dwarshuis 3/44 (17.1 overs)
8/193d (60 overs); Baxter Holt 49* (63); Wes Agar 3/43 (16 overs)		3/82 (30.5 overs); Henry Hunt 25 (61); Chris Tremain 1/7 (4 overs)

Match drawn
North Dalton Park, Wollongong
Umpires: Ben Treloar and Sam Nogajski
Player of the match: Wes Agar (South Australia)

- New South Wales won the toss and elected to bat.
- Both teams were penalised 2 points for slow over rates.
- Points: South Australia 0.51, New South Wales 0.46

31 October−3 November 2022
Scorecard

Queensland	v	Western Australia (home team)
211 (89.2 overs); Michael Neser 56 (113); Jhye Richardson 4/40 (20.2 overs)		115 (45 overs); Aaron Hardie 44 (74); Mark Steketee 6/38 (13 overs)
97 (35.3 overs); Joe Burns 31 (43); Lance Morris 4/26 (8.3 overs)		7/196 (74.1 overs); Aaron Hardie 70* (121); Michael Neser 5/36 (19 overs)

Western Australia won by 3 wickets
WACA Ground, Perth
Umpires: Shawn Craig and Simon Lightbody
Player of the match: Aaron Hardie (Western Australia)

- Western Australia won the toss and elected to field.
- Points: Western Australia 7, Queensland 1.11

=== Round 4 ===
10−13 November 2022
Scorecard

Victoria	v	Queensland (home team)
63 (32.4 overs); Ashley Chandrasinghe 16 (84); Mark Steketee 5/19 (11 overs)		205 (75.2 overs); Gurinder Sandhu 42 (81); Scott Boland 3/41 (23 overs)
132 (42.92 overs); Will Sutherland 48 (53); Michael Neser 5/48 (16.2 overs)

Queensland won by an innings and 10 runs
Allan Border Field, Brisbane
Umpires: Gerard Abood and Philip Gillespie
Player of the match: Michael Neser (Queensland)

- Victoria won the toss and elected to bat.
- Points: Queensland 7.05, Victoria 1

11−14 November 2022
Scorecard

South Australia	v	Western Australia (home team)
299 (102.3 overs); Henry Hunt 71 (167); Matthew Kelly 5/34 (27 overs)		444 (151.1 overs); Sam Whiteman 193 (394); Ben Manenti 5/107 (31.1 overs)
117 (35.3 overs); Ben Manenti 39 (25); Matthew Kelly 4/23 (12 overs)

Western Australia won by an innings and 28 runs
WACA Ground, Perth
Umpires: Bruce Oxenford and Michael Graham-Smith
Player of the match: Sam Whiteman (Western Australia)

- Western Australia won the toss and elected to field.
- Ben Manenti (South Australia) took his maiden five-wicket haul in first-class cricket.
- Points: Western Australia 7.59, South Australia 0.9

12−15 November 2022
Scorecard

(home team) Tasmania	v	New South Wales
333 (95.4 overs); Matthew Wade 146 (198); Ben Dwarshuis 4/88 (22 overs)		7/216d (64 overs); Sean Abbott 53 (82); Riley Meredith 4/65 (15 overs)
2/176 (24 overs); Tim Ward 90* (71); Jason Sangha 1/35 (6 overs)

Match drawn
Blundstone Arena, Hobart
Umpires: Donovan Koch and Greg Davidson
Player of the match: Matthew Wade (Tasmania)

- New South Wales won the toss and elected to field.
- Only 8 overs of play were possible on day 2 due to rain.
- No play was possible on day 4 due to rain.
- Points: Tasmania 3.03, New South Wales 2.16

=== Round 5 ===
20−23 November 2022
Scorecard

(home team) South Australia	v	Queensland
240 (104.4 overs); Harry Nielsen 90 (235); Xavier Bartlett 4/64 (28 overs)		342 (115.1 overs); Joe Burns 85 (237); Nathan McAndrew 5/93 (26 overs)
3/246 (92 overs); Nathan McSweeney 77 (218); Xavier Bartlett 2/48 (18 overs)

Match drawn
Adelaide Oval, Adelaide
Umpires: Nathan Johnstone and Shawn Craig
Player of the match: Nathan McAndrew (South Australia)

- Queensland won the toss and elected to field.
- Only 52.5 overs of play were possible on day 1 due to rain.
- Points: Queensland 2.24, South Australia 1.97

22−25 November 2022
Scorecard

Western Australia	v	New South Wales (home team)
233 (95 overs); Sam Fanning 61 (135); Chris Green 4/71 (30 overs)		93 (38 overs); Daniel Hughes 30 (96); Corey Rocchiccioli 4/31 (16 overs)
127 (56 overs); D'Arcy Short 39 (101); Chris Green 5/41 (20 overs)		134 (40.3 overs); Chris Green 38 (37); Corey Rocchiccioli 4/68 (15 overs)

Western Australia won by 133 runs
Sydney Cricket Ground, Sydney
Umpires: Ben Treloar and Michael Graham-Smith
Player of the match: Chris Green (New South Wales)

- Western Australia won the toss and elected to field.
- Chris Green and Toby Gray (New South Wales) both made their first-class debut.
- Chris Green took his maiden five-wicket haul in first-class cricket.
- Points: Western Australia 7.33, New South Wales 1

24−27 November 2022
Scorecard

(home team) Victoria	v	Tasmania
121 (52.4 overs); Fergus O'Neill 31 (54); Jackson Bird 4/13 (15 overs)		220 (79.4 overs); Jake Doran 85 (154); Sam Elliott 3/45 (20.4 overs)
336 (93.1 overs); Sam Elliott 80 (162); Jackson Bird 4/54 (27 overs)		6/241 (74.1 overs); Jake Doran 47* (76); Will Sutherland 4/69 (24 overs)

Tasmania won by 4 wickets
Melbourne Cricket Ground, Melbourne
Umpires: Greg Davidson and Simon Lightbody
Player of the match: Jackson Bird (Tasmania)

- Tasmania won the toss and elected to field.
- Campbell Kellaway and Sam Elliott (Victoria) both made their first-class debut.
- Points: Tasmania 7.2, Victoria 1

=== Round 6 ===
1−4 December 2022
Scorecard

(home team) Victoria	v	New South Wales
209 (74.1 overs); Will Sutherland 39 (80); Sam Harper 39 (80); Sean Abbott 4/56 (18.1 overs)		260 (86.1 overs); Moises Henriques 97 (179); Will Sutherland 4/57 (22.1 overs)
283 (98.1 overs); Campbell Kellaway 81 (171); Chris Green 2/27 (16 overs)		163 (58.4 overs); Daniel Hughes 33 (83); Will Sutherland 5/58 (20 overs)

Victoria won by 69 runs
CitiPower Centre, St Kilda
Umpires: Phillip Gillespie and Shawn Craig
Player of the match: Will Sutherland (Victoria)

- New South Wales won the toss and elected to field.
- Ruwantha Kellepotha and Matthew Short replaced Jon Holland and Sam Harper for Victoria on day 2 as COVID-19 substitutes.
- Jack Prestwidge replaced Sam Elliott for Victoria on day 3 as a concussion substitute, making his first-class debut in the process.
- Points: Victoria 7.09, New South Wales 1.6

1−3 December 2022
Scorecard

South Australia	v	Tasmania (home team)
329 (99.2 overs); Nathan McSweeney 118 (241); Peter Siddle 4/59 (25 overs)		148 (50.3 overs); Jake Doran 42 (53); Brendan Doggett 4/21 (12.3 overs)
236 (68.5 overs); Daniel Drew 92 (157); Jackson Bird 4/48 (16 overs)		208 (51.3 overs); Jarrod Freeman 52 (47); Wes Agar 4/32 (12.3 overs)

South Australia won by 208 runs
Blundstone Arena, Hobart
Umpires: Donovan Koch and Nathan Johnstone
Player of the match: Nathan McSweeney (South Australia)

- Tasmania won the toss and elected to field.
- Nathan McSweeney scored his maiden century in first-class cricket.
- Points: South Australia 8.29, Tasmania 1

1−4 December 2022
Scorecard

(home team) Queensland	v	Western Australia
6/295d (102.3 overs); Bryce Street 83 (182); Joel Paris 3/26 (21 overs)		7/427d (160 overs); Sam Whiteman 10* (11); Mark Steketee 0/3 (2 overs)
7/97 (65.4 overs); Jack Clayton 37* (160); Lance Morris 3/22 (17 overs)

Match drawn
The Gabba, Brisbane
Umpires: Ben Treloar and Bruce Oxenford
Player of the match: Cameron Bancroft (Western Australia)

- Western Australia won the toss and elected to field.
- No play was possible on day 1 due to rain.
- Points: Queensland 1.94, Western Australia 1.91

=== Round 7 ===
9−12 February 2023
Scorecard

(home team) Victoria	v	Queensland
307 (103.1 overs); Marcus Harris 100 (148); Michael Neser 4/71 (23.1 overs)		175 (64.3 overs); Michael Neser 43 (78); Will Sutherland 4/35 (13.3 overs)
217 (78.4 overs); Mitch Perry 75 (152); Xavier Bartlett 4/32 (14 overs)		185 (89.2 overs); Jack Clayton 66 (144); Jon Holland 3/24 (17 overs)

Victoria won by 164 runs
Melbourne Cricket Ground, Melbourne
Umpires: Phillip Gillespie and Troy Penman
Player of the match: Marcus Harris (Victoria)

- Queensland won the toss and elected to field.
- Points: Victoria 7.94, Queensland 0.8

10−13 February 2023
Scorecard

(home team) South Australia	v	Western Australia
7/438d (126 overs); Daniel Drew 208* (345); Charlie Stobo 3/54 (27 overs)		162 (51 overs); Marcus Stoinis 56 (68); Nathan McAndrew 3/51 (14 overs)
6/191d (50 overs); Nathan McSweeney 104* (131); Matthew Kelly 3/38 (14 overs)		303 (97.2 overs); Cameron Bancroft 80 (159); Nathan McAndrew 4/73 (28 overs)

South Australia won by 164 runs
Adelaide Oval, Adelaide
Umpires: Paul Wilson and Stephen Dionysius
Player of the match: Daniel Drew (South Australia)

- Western Australia won the toss and elected to field.
- Points: South Australia 8.23, Western Australia 0.5

11−14 February 2023
Scorecard

(home team) New South Wales	v	Tasmania
8/417d (142 overs); Daniel Hughes 178 (337); Peter Siddle 2/55 (21 overs)		236 (104 overs); Beau Webster 75* (150); Sean Abbott 3/40 (22 overs)
1/105d (25 overs); Daniel Hughes 63* (78); Jarrod Freeman 1/34 (7 overs)		0/6 (8 overs); Tim Ward 4* (32)

Match drawn
Sydney Cricket Ground, Sydney
Umpires: Donovan Koch and Gerard Abood
Player of the match: Daniel Hughes (New South Wales)

- New South Wales won the toss and elected to bat.
- Points: New South Wales 2.71, Tasmania 1.56

=== Round 8 ===
20−23 February 2023
Scorecard

(home team) Victoria	v	South Australia
169 (53.3 overs); Matthew Short 70 (69); Wes Agar 5/54 (14.3 overs)		114 (55.5 overs); Nathan McSweeney 23 (60); Fergus O'Neill 4/28 (19 overs)
312 (84.3 overs); Matthew Short 119 (135); Spencer Johnson 6/87 (23.3 overs)		190 (59.5 overs); Ben Manenti 82 (96); Mitchell Perry 5/64 (17.3 overs)

Victoria won by 177 runs
CitiPower Centre, St Kilda
Umpires: Donovan Koch and Simon Lightbody
Player of the match: Matthew Short (Victoria)

- Victoria won the toss and elected to bat.
- Harry Matthias and Spencer Johnson (South Australia) both made their first-class debut.
- Points: Victoria 7, South Australia 1

21−24 February 2023
Scorecard

Western Australia	v	Tasmania (home team)
300 (88 overs); Josh Inglis 116 (134); Jackson Bird 4/51 (22 overs)		169 (64.2 overs); Beau Webster 52 (102); Charlie Stobo 3/45 (16.2 overs)
3/372d (100 overs); Cameron Bancroft 176* (280); Nathan Ellis 1/70 (19 overs)		120 (35.2 overs); Beau Webster 30 (63); Mathew Kelly 4/41 (11 overs)

Western Australia won by 383 runs
Blundstone Arena, Hobart
Umpires: Sam Nogajski and Sharad Patel
Player of the match: Cameron Bancroft (Western Australia)

- Tasmania won the toss and elected to field.
- Points: Western Australia 8, Tasmania 1

21−24 February 2023
Scorecard

New South Wales	v	Queensland (home team)
320 (97.4 overs); Matthew Gilkes 94 (160); Xavier Bartlett 4/50 (15.4 overs)		304 (95.1 overs); Jimmy Peirson 115 (162); Sean Abbott 5/76 (25.1 overs)
216 (64.5 overs); Ben Dwarshuis 48* (45); Mark Steketee 3/36 (16 overs)		5/235 (82.5 overs); Jack Clayton 87* (197); Hayden Kerr 2/37 (13 overs)

Queensland won by 5 wickets
The Gabba, Brisbane
Umpires: David Taylor and Paul Wilson
Player of the match: Jimmy Peirson (Queensland)

- Queensland won the toss and elected to field.
- Aryan Jain and Jack Sinfield (Queensland) both made their first-class debuts.
- Points: Queensland 8.04, New South Wales 2.2

=== Round 9 ===
2−5 March 2023
Scorecard

(home team) New South Wales	v	Victoria
203 (82.3 overs); Chris Green 52 (126); Mitchell Perry 4/24 (14.3 overs)		331 (125 overs); Matthew Short 104 (196); Liam Hatcher 4/95 (26 overs)
130 (51.1 overs); Chris Green 39* (85); Mitchell Perry 4/30 (15.1 overs)		0/3 (2.2 overs); Travis Dean 3* (12)

Victoria won by 10 wickets
Lavington Sports Ground, Albury
Umpires: Bruce Oxenford and Nathan Johnstone
Player of the match: Matthew Short (Victoria)

- Victoria won the toss and elected to field.
- Oliver Davies (New South Wales) made his first-class debut.
- Points: Victoria 7.39, New South Wales 0.63

2−5 March 2023
Scorecard

South Australia	v	Queensland (home team)
272 (80 overs); Ben Manenti 88 (101); Xavier Bartlett 3/54 (16 overs)		290 (101 overs); Jimmy Peirson 90 (150); Spencer Johnson 7/47 (23 overs)
111 (46.5 overs); Jake Carder 32 (70); Mark Steketee 4/34 (14.4 overs)		5/96 (26.2 overs); Sam Heazlett 26 (41); Liam Scott 2/20 (6 overs)

Queensland won by 5 wickets
The Gabba, Brisbane
Umpires: Gerard Abood and Michael Graham-Smith
Player of the match: Jimmy Peirson (Queensland)

- Queensland won the toss and elected to field.
- Points: Queensland 7.89, South Australia 1.62

2−5 March 2023
Scorecard

Tasmania	v	Western Australia (home team)
179 (67.5 overs); Tim Ward 44 (109); Corey Rocchiccioli 4/31 (12 overs)		336 (101.1 overs); Mitchell Marsh 108* (111); Jarrod Freeman 4/81 (23 overs)
236 (86 overs); Caleb Jewell 121 (194); Charlie Stobo 4/57 (19 overs)		1/82 (16.3 overs); Sam Whiteman 31 (39); Lawrence Neil-Smith 1/18 (5 overs)

Western Australia won by 9 wickets
WACA Ground, Perth
Umpires: Phillip Gillespie and Simon Lightbody
Player of the match: Charlie Stobo (Western Australia)

- Tasmania won the toss and elected to bat.
- Points: Western Australia 8.34, Tasmania 0.9

=== Round 10 ===
14−17 March 2023
Scorecard

Tasmania (home team)	v	Queensland
7/479d (140 overs); Beau Webster 168* (285); Liam Guthrie 4/103 (27 overs)		300 (81.5 overs); Max Bryant 84 (100); Jackson Bird 3/72 (17.5 overs)
5/252d (60 overs); Jordan Silk 101* (137); Liam Guthrie 2/48 (13 overs)		1/184 (62 overs); Bryce Street 102* (216); Lawrence Neil-Smith 1/30 (12 overs)

Match drawn
Blundstone Arena, Hobart
Umpires: Shawn Craig and Michael Graham-Smith
Player of the match: Beau Webster (Tasmania)

- Queensland won the toss and elected to field.
- Iain Carlisle (Tasmania) made his first-class debut.
- Points: Tasmania 3.3, Queensland 2.6

14−17 March 2023
Scorecard

New South Wales	v	South Australia (home team)
9/447d (133.4 overs); Jack Edwards 138 (179); Nathan McAndrew 6/97 (32.4 overs)		7/309d (100 overs); Jake Lehmann 101* (178); Chris Tremain 3/75 (24 overs)
3/247d (49 overs); Ryan Hackney 102 (123); Ben Manenti 2/74 (15 overs)		7/290 (86.4 overs); Daniel Drew 84 (139); Ryan Hadley 2/44 (14 overs)

Match drawn
Karen Rolton Oval, Adelaide
Umpires: Donovan Koch and Sam Nogajski
Player of the match: Jack Edwards (New South Wales)

- South Australia won the toss and elected to field.
- Blake MacDonald and Ryan Hadley (New South Wales) both made their first-class debuts.
- Points: New South Wales 2.89, South Australia 2.79

14−17 March 2023
Scorecard

Western Australia (home team)	v	Victoria
122 (61 overs); Ashton Turner 27 (69); Scott Boland 4/29 (15 overs)		298 (92 overs); Marcus Harris 84 (140); Cameron Gannon 4/93 (23 overs)
236 (91.5 overs); Hilton Cartwright 82 (194); Scott Boland 4/69 (25.5 overs)		3/64 (26.2 overs); Marcus Harris 29 (49); Cameron Gannon 1/9 (3 overs)

Victoria won by 7 wickets
WACA Ground, Perth
Umpires: Greg Davidson and Ben Treloar
Player of the match: Scott Boland (Victoria)

- Victoria won the toss and elected to field.
- Points: Victoria 7.98, Western Australia 1

== Final ==
23−27 March 2023
Scorecard

Victoria	v	Western Australia (home team)
195 (95.5 overs); Ashley Chandrasinghe 46* (280); Lance Morris 3/53 (20 overs)		315 (119 overs); Ashton Turner 128 (227); Will Sutherland 5/75 (28 overs)
210 (60.2 overs); Will Sutherland 83 (84); Matthew Kelly 4/41 (16 overs)		1/93 (24.4 overs); Teague Wyllie 43* (50); Scott Boland 1/27 (8 overs)

Western Australia won by 9 wickets
WACA Ground, Perth
Umpires: Michael Graham-Smith and Sam Nogajski
Player of the match: Ashton Turner (Western Australia)

- Western Australia won the toss and elected to field.

== Statistics ==
=== Most runs ===
Player	Team	Mat	Inns	NO	Runs	Ave	HS	100	50
Cameron Bancroft	Western Australia	11	20	4	945	59.06	176*	4	1
Daniel Drew	South Australia	8	16	1	656	43.73	208*	1	3
Caleb Jewell	Tasmania	10	19	2	652	38.35	121	2	3
Peter Handscomb	Victoria	6	10	1	634	70.44	281*	2	2
Hilton Cartwright	Western Australia	11	18	2	629	39.31	82	0	7

=== Most wickets ===
Player	Team	Mat	Inns	Overs	Wkts	Ave	Econ	BBI	BBM	5	10
Will Sutherland	Victoria	10	18	309.0	41	19.92	2.64	5/58	9/115	2	0
Michael Neser	Queensland	8	15	271.3	40	16.67	2.45	5/36	9/70	2	0
Mark Steketee	Queensland	9	16	265.5	38	18.86	2.69	6/38	7/104	2	0
Wes Agar	South Australia	9	16	317.0	36	27.36	3.10	5/54	7/130	1	0
Matthew Kelly	Western Australia	8	16	254.2	35	15.77	2.17	5/34	9/57	1	0
