= 2023–24 Marsh One-Day Cup =

Cricket tournament

- Dates: 24 September 2023 – 25 February 2024
- Administrator: Cricket Australia
- Cricket format: List A
- Tournament format: Round-robin tournament
- Host(s): Adelaide; Brisbane; Hobart; Launceston; Mackay; Melbourne; Perth; Sydney
- Champions: Western Australia (17th title)
- Participants: 6
- Matches: 22
- Most runs: Daniel Hughes (NSW) (453)
- Most wickets: Andrew Tye (WA) (15)

The 2023–24 Marsh One-Day Cup is the 55th season of the official List A domestic cricket competition played in Australia. The tournament runs from 24 September 2023 to 25 February 2024.

In the final, Western Australia beat New South Wales by 5 wickets to win their 17th one-day title and third in a row.

== Points table ==
Pos	Team	Pld	W	L	T	NR	BP	Ded	Pts	NRR
1	New South Wales	7	5	2	0	0	2	0	22	0.330
2	Western Australia	7	5	2	0	0	1	0	21	0.543
3	Victoria	7	5	2	0	0	1	0	21	0.232
4	Tasmania	7	3	4	0	0	1	0	13	−0.201
5	Queensland	7	1	5	0	1	1	0	7	−0.735
6	South Australia	7	1	5	0	1	0	1	5	−0.327

Updated to match(es) played on 14 February 2024. Source: Cricket Australia
- Qualified to the final

RESULT POINTS:

- Win – 4
- Tie – 2 each
- No Result – 2 each
- Loss – 0
- Bonus Point – 1 (run rate 1.25 times that of opposition)

== Fixtures ==
24 September 2023
10:35
Scorecard

(H) Queensland; 238 (46.2 overs)	v	Western Australia; 6/242 (40.2 overs)
Ben McDermott 52 (69); Lance Morris 4/64 (10 overs)		Josh Philippe 90 (88); Mark Steketee 2/39 (8 overs)

Western Australia won by 4 wickets
Allan Border Field, Brisbane
Umpires: Donovan Koch and Claire Polosak
Player of the match: Josh Philippe (Western Australia)

- Western Australia won the toss and elected to field.
- Cooper Connolly (Western Australia) made his List A debut.

25 September 2023
10:05
Scorecard

Tasmania; 224 (50 overs)	v	Victoria (H); 7/229 (44.5 overs)
Beau Webster 83 (86); Scott Boland 2/30 (10 overs)		Peter Handscomb 51 (42); Beau Webster 2/17 (4 overs)

Victoria won by 3 wickets
Junction Oval, Melbourne
Umpires: Nathan Johnstone and Shawn Craig
Player of the match: Beau Webster (Tasmania)

- Victoria won the toss and elected to field.

26 September 2023
14:05 (D/N)
Scorecard

Western Australia; 7/371 (50 overs)	v	South Australia (H); 8/349 (50 overs)
Sam Whiteman 89 (91); Brendan Doggett 2/52 (10 overs)		Daniel Drew 120 (119); D'Arcy Short 3/81 (8 overs)

Western Australia won by 22 runs
Allan Border Field, Brisbane
Umpires: Andrew Crozier and Donovan Koch
Player of the match: Ashton Turner (Western Australia)

- South Australia won the toss and elected to field.

27 September 2023
10:05
Scorecard

Tasmania; 198 (49.5 overs)	v	New South Wales (H); 4/202 (34.3 overs)
Beau Webster 65 (80); Jack Edwards 2/24 (9 overs)		Jack Edwards 92 (63); Patrick Dooley 2/60 (8 overs)

New South Wales won by 6 wickets
Junction Oval, Melbourne
Umpires: Ben Treloar and Phillip Gillespie
Player of the match: Jack Edwards (New South Wales)

- New South Wales won the toss and elected to field.
- Lawrence Neil-Smith (Tasmania) made his List A debut.

28 September 2023
14:05 (D/N)
Scorecard

South Australia	v	Queensland (H)

No result (abandoned with a toss)
Allan Border Field, Brisbane
Umpires: Donovan Koch and Stephen Dionysius

- Queensland won the toss and elected to field.
- No play was possible due to rain.

29 September 2023
10:05
Scorecard

(H) Victoria; 7/298 (50 overs)	v	New South Wales; 239 (46.2 overs)
Sam Harper 96 (98); Hayden Kerr 3/57 (10 overs)		Daniel Hughes 69 (93); Will Sutherland 3/39 (8.2 overs)

Victoria won by 59 runs
Junction Oval, Melbourne
Umpires: David Taylor and Michael Graham-Smith
Player of the match: Sam Harper (Victoria)

- Victoria won the toss and elected to bat.

8 October 2023
10:00
Scorecard

Tasmania; 9/435 (50 overs)	v	South Australia (H); 398 (46.4 overs)
Jordan Silk 116 (85); Brendan Doggett 3/86 (9 overs)		Jake Fraser-McGurk 125 (38); Mitchell Owen 3/46 (8 overs)

Tasmania won by 37 runs
Karen Rolton Oval, Adelaide
Umpires: Greg Davidson and Sam Nogajski
Player of the match: Jake Fraser-McGurk (South Australia)

- South Australia won the toss and elected to field.
- Tasmania scored the highest innings total in Marsh Cup history.
- Jake Fraser-McGurk (South Australia) scored the fastest ever List A century off 29 balls.

9 October 2023
10:00
Scorecard

(H) New South Wales; 217 (44.1 overs)	v	Queensland; 9/219 (37.2 overs)
Moises Henriques 82 (84); Liam Guthrie 3/58 (9.1 overs)		Sam Heazlett 58 (46); Jack Edwards 4/38 (8 overs)

Queensland won by 1 wicket
North Sydney Oval, Sydney
Umpires: Nathan Johnstone and Simon Lightbody
Player of the match: Gurinder Sandhu (Queensland)

- Queensland won the toss and elected to field.
- Jack Nisbet (New South Wales) made his List A debut.
- Queensland's 10th wicket partnership of 73 runs was the highest in One-Day Cup history.

9 October 2023
10:00
Scorecard

Victoria; 107 (21.1 overs)	v	Western Australia (H); 4/109 (23.4 overs)
Fergus O'Neill 22 (13); Andrew Tye 3/14 (3.1 overs)		D'Arcy Short 39 (39); Will Sutherland 2/14 (6 overs)

Western Australia won by 6 wickets
WACA Ground, Perth
Umpires: Gerard Abood and Shawn Craig
Player of the match: Jason Behrendorff (Western Australia)

- Western Australia won the toss and elected to field.

19 October 2023
10:05
Scorecard

Victoria; 6/349 (50 overs)	v	Queensland (H); 330 (48.1 overs)
Matthew Short 134 (100); Jack Wildermuth 3/72 (10 overs)		Matt Renshaw 102 (68); Todd Murphy 3/45 (10 overs)

Victoria won by 19 runs
Great Barrier Reef Arena, Mackay
Umpires: Donovan Koch and Sharad Patel
Player of the match: Matthew Short (Victoria)

- Queensland won the toss and elected to field.

20 October 2023
10:00
Scorecard

New South Wales; 7/291 (50 overs)	v	South Australia (H); 258 (48.2 overs)
Moises Henriques 103* (72); Harry Conway 2/45 (10 overs)		Henry Hunt 75 (95); Will Salzmann 3/48 (9.2 overs)

New South Wales won by 33 runs
Adelaide Oval, Adelaide
Umpires: Michael Graham-Smith and Troy Penman
Player of the match: Moises Henriques (New South Wales)

- South Australia won the toss and elected to field.
- Liam Hatcher (New South Wales) took a hat-trick, dismissing Ben Manenti, Nathan McAndrew and Wes Agar in consecutive deliveries.

31 October 2023
11:05
Scorecard

(H) Tasmania; 8/376 (50 overs)	v	Queensland; 348 (49.5 overs)
Caleb Jewell 137 (137); Liam Guthrie 3/76 (10 overs)		Ben McDermott 143 (112); Patrick Dooley 2/47 (10 overs)

Tasmania won by 28 runs
Bellerive Oval, Hobart
Umpires: Ben Treloar and Michael Graham-Smith
Player of the match: Caleb Jewell (Tasmania)

- Queensland won the toss and elected to field.

4 November 2023
10:00
Scorecard

Western Australia; 216 (42.2 overs)	v	New South Wales (H); 8/225 (42 overs)
Josh Philippe 61 (60); Will Salzmann 4/48 (9 overs)		Blake Macdonald 81 (93); Andrew Tye 3/43 (9 overs)

New South Wales won by 2 wickets (DLS method)
Cricket Central, Sydney Olympic Park, Sydney
Umpires: Gerard Abood and Greg Davidson
Player of the match: Blake Macdonald (New South Wales)

- New South Wales won the toss and elected to field.
- Match reduced to 43 overs due to rain.
- New South Wales were set a revised target of 222.
- Blake Macdonald (New South Wales), Hamish McKenzie and Mahli Beardman (Western Australia) all made their List A debuts.

11 November 2023
11:05
Scorecard

(H) Tasmania; 156 (37.5 overs)	v	Victoria; 4/160 (35.4 overs)
Beau Webster 47 (76); Sam Elliott 4/26 (7.5 overs)		Matthew Short 81* (88); Tom Rogers 2/38 (9 overs)

Victoria won by 6 wickets
University of Tasmania Stadium, Launceston
Umpires: Simon Lightbody and Sam Nogajski
Player of the match: Sam Elliott (Victoria)

- Victoria won the toss and elected to field.

20 November 2023
12:35 (D/N)
Scorecard

South Australia; 7/279 (50 overs)	v	Western Australia (H); 6/282 (49.3 overs)
Daniel Drew 84 (96); D'Arcy Short 1/27 (4 overs)		Sam Whiteman 137* (124); Lloyd Pope 3/59 (10 overs)

Western Australia won by 4 wickets
WACA Ground, Perth
Umpires: Nathan Johnstone and Sam Nogajski
Player of the match: Sam Whiteman (Western Australia)

- Western Australia won the toss and elected to field.
- Sam Whiteman scored his maiden century in List A cricket.

1 February 2024
11:05
Scorecard

(H) Western Australia; 161 (39.1 overs)	v	New South Wales; 5/163 (32.2 overs)
D'Arcy Short 47 (53); Jack Edwards 3/14 (8 overs)		Daniel Hughes 52 (83); Cameron Gannon 2/24 (8 overs)

New South Wales won by 5 wickets
WACA Ground, Perth
Umpires: Ben Treloar and Nathan Johnstone
Player of the match: Jack Edwards (New South Wales)

- New South Wales won the toss and elected to field.
- Sam Fanning (Western Australia) made his List A debut.

8 February 2024
10:00
Scorecard

South Australia; 9/231 (50 overs)	v	Victoria (H); 7/234 (44.1 overs)
Harry Nielsen 61 (86); Fergus O'Neill 3/38 (10 overs)		Tom Rogers 67 (87); Jordan Buckingham 3/36 (10 overs)

Victoria won by 3 wickets
Junction Oval, Melbourne
Umpires: Greg Davidson and Simon Lightbody
Player of the match: Fergus O'Neill (Victoria)

- Victoria won the toss and elected to field.
- Jake Winter (South Australia) made his List A debut.

8 February 2024
13:05 (D/N)
Scorecard

(H) Queensland; 150 (35.3 overs)	v	Tasmania; 5/153 (27 overs)
Max Bryant 32 (50); Iain Carlisle 3/39 (8 overs)		Caleb Jewell 61 (68); Liam Guthrie 1/15 (4 overs)

Tasmania won by 5 wickets
The Gabba, Brisbane
Umpires: Andrew Crozier and Bruce Oxenford
Player of the match: Caleb Jewell (Tasmania)

- Queensland won the toss and elected to bat.
- Hugo Burdon (Queensland) made his List A debut.

14 February 2024
10:30
Scorecard

Queensland; 218 (49.4 overs)	v	South Australia (H); 5/223 (44.1 overs)
Marnus Labuschagne 74 (99); Jordan Buckingham 6/41 (10 overs)		Thomas Kelly 81 (66); Gurinder Sandhu 2/26 (10 overs)

South Australia won by 5 wickets
Karen Rolton Oval, Adelaide
Umpires: Nathan Johnstone and Bruce Oxenford
Player of the match: Jordan Buckingham (South Australia)

- South Australia won the toss and elected to field.
- Dylan McLachlan (Queensland) made his List A debut.
- Jordan Buckingham (South Australia) took his maiden five-wicket haul in List A cricket.
- Alex Carey (South Australia) equalled the record for most dismissals (8) by a wicket-keeper in a List A match.

14 February 2024
11:00
Scorecard

Western Australia; 4/320 (50 overs)	v	Tasmania (H); 268 (36.2 overs)
D'Arcy Short 127 (121); Billy Stanlake 2/54 (10 overs)		Charlie Wakim 68 (53); Ashton Agar 3/54 (10 overs)

Western Australia won by 52 runs
Bellerive Oval, Hobart
Umpires: Gerard Abood and Ben Treloar
Player of the match: D'Arcy Short (Western Australia)

- Western Australia won the toss and elected to bat.
- Keaton Critchell and Bryce Jackson (Western Australia) made their List A debuts.

14 February 2024
11:35
Scorecard

Victoria; 311 (48.4 overs)	v	New South Wales (H); 3/256 (40.5 overs)
Tom Rogers 196 (142); Ben Dwarshuis 4/40 (9 overs)		Daniel Hughes 119 (126); Sam Elliott 1/19 (5 overs)

New South Wales won by 7 wickets (DLS method)
North Sydney Oval, Sydney
Umpires: Greg Davidson and Simon Lightbody
Player of the match: Tom Rogers (Victoria)

- New South Wales won the toss and elected to field.
- New South Wales were set a revised target of 253 from 42 overs.
- Tom Rogers (Victoria) scored his maiden century in List A cricket.

== Final ==
25 February 2024
10:05
Scorecard

(H) New South Wales; 169 (42 overs)	v	Western Australia; 5/170 (33.2 overs)
Oliver Davies 51 (53); Joel Paris 4/21 (9 overs)		Hilton Cartwright 73* (80); Will Salzmann 1/22 (3 overs)

Western Australia won by 5 wickets
Cricket Central, Sydney Olympic Park, Sydney
Umpires: Shawn Craig and Sam Nogajski
Player of the match: Hilton Cartwright (Western Australia)

- Western Australia won the toss and elected to field.

== Statistics ==
=== Most runs ===
Player	Team	Mat	Inns	NO	Runs	Ave	HS	100	50
Daniel Hughes	New South Wales	8	8	0	453	56.62	119	1	4
Sam Whiteman	Western Australia	8	8	2	419	69.83	137*	1	2
Tom Rogers	Victoria	7	7	0	406	58	196	1	1
Moises Henriques	New South Wales	8	8	3	364	72.8	103*	1	2
Caleb Jewell	Tasmania	7	7	0	327	46.71	137	1	2

=== Most wickets ===
Player	Team	Mat	Overs	Runs	Wkts	Ave	BBI	SR	4WI
Andrew Tye	Western Australia	8	60.3	355	15	23.66	3/14	24.2	0
Jack Edwards	New South Wales	6	49.0	184	14	13.14	4/38	21	1
Will Salzmann	New South Wales	5	33.3	192	13	14.76	4/48	15.46	1
Will Sutherland	Victoria	7	59.3	295	13	22.69	3/39	27.46	0
Sam Elliott	Victoria	7	55.3	307	13	23.61	4/26	25.61	1

== Television coverage ==
Every match of the 2023–24 Marsh Cup is streamed live by Cricket Australia through their website and the CA Live app. Kayo Sports also streams all 22 matches. Fox Cricket will broadcast 13 matches, including the final.

== See also ==
- 2023–24 Sheffield Shield season
