= Luke Doran =

Australian cricketer

Personal information
- Full name: Luke Andrew Doran
- Born: 14 August 1991 (age 35); Baulkham Hills, Sydney, New South Wales
- Batting: Right-handed
- Bowling: Slow left-arm orthodox
- Role: Bowler
- Relatives: Jake Doran (brother)

Domestic team information
- Years: Team
- 2010/11–2012/13: New South Wales
- 2011/12–2012/13: Sydney Thunder
- 2014/15: Sydney Sixers

Career statistics
Competition	LA	T20
Matches	3	15
Runs scored	0	7
Batting average	–	3.50
100s/50s	0/0	0/0
Top score	0*	4
Balls bowled	216	240
Wickets	8	8
Bowling average	17.62	35.87
5 wickets in innings	0	0
10 wickets in match	–	–
Best bowling	4/40	2/22
Catches/stumpings	0/–	2/–
- Source: ESPNcricinfo, 8 March 2024

Luke Andrew Doran (born 14 August 1991 in Baulkham Hills, Sydney, New South Wales) is an Australian cricketer who plays for the Sydney Sixers and the New South Wales Blues. He was a member of Australia's 2010 Under-19 Cricket World Cup squad which won the 2010 Under-19 Cricket World Cup in New Zealand. He has played in three List A matches for New South Wales, and 15 Big Bash games for the Sydney Sixers. Doran did not play in the 2015–16 Big Bash League season due to a side strain, although he was in the Sixers semi-final squad.

Doran previously represented the Fairfield-Liverpool Lions, and now also represents Lindisfarne in the Cricket Tasmania Premier League; in the 2015 final, Doran was dismissed for 87 and threw his bat at the match official.

He is the older brother of cricketer Jake Doran; both attended The Hills Sports High School in Sydney.
