= Kyle Brazell =

Australian cricketer (born 2001)

Personal information
- Full name: Kyle Brazell
- Born: 20 September 2001 (age 25)
- Batting: Left-handed
- Bowling: Slow left-arm orthodox

Domestic team information
- Years: Team
- 2023/24: South Australia (squad no. 3)

Career statistics
Competition	FC
Matches	3
Runs scored	104
Batting average	17.33
100s/50s	0/0
Top score	30
Catches/stumpings	0/–
- Source: ESPNcricinfo, 13 March 2024

Kyle Brazell (born 20 September 2001) is an Australian cricketer. He made his first-class cricket debut for South Australia against Queensland on 16 February 2024 in the 2023–24 Sheffield Shield season. Brazell was the captain of Tea Tree Gully District Cricket Club in South Australian Premier Cricket.

== Career ==
As a teenager, Brazell attended Rostrevor College and played both cricket and Australian rules football. In 2017, his successes in junior cricket shifted his focus away from football. He played for the South Australia in the under-15 national cricket championships, then later in the year played for a Cricket Australia XI at the under-17 national championships, where he was the top run-scorer for the tournament and named player of the tournament. This performance earned him a spot in the Australia under-17s squad that played at the under-19 national championships in December 2017. He also made his senior Grade debut in October 2017 for Tea Tree Gully. His school team at Rostrevor toured Sri Lanka in June 2018, and for the 2018/19 season, Brazell transferred from Tea Tree Gully to Adelaide University to bat further up the batting order. He was again selected to play for Cricket Australia in the under-19 national championships in 2018.

In 2020, Brazell played for the North Adelaide Football Club in the South Australian National Football League. He nominated for the 2020 AFL draft but was not selected. He subsequently earned a rookie contract with the South Australia cricket team for the 2021/22 season. In the 2021/22 season, Brazell finished second in Adelaide University's club champion award to Will Bosisto, then transferred back to Tea Tree Gully for the 2022/23 season.

Brazell didn't play a match for South Australia in the 2022/23 season, but retained his rookie contract for the 2023/24 season. After scoring a century for Tea Tree Gully in SACA Premier Cricket, Brazell made his first-class debut in a Sheffield Shield match against Queensland beginning on 16 February 2024, being handed his Baggy Red by former South Australian player Callum Ferguson. He opened the batting for South Australia, registering a duck in the first innings and 25 runs in the second. Brazell played two more first-class matches in the 2023/24 season, but wasn't able to break into the team in the 2024/25 season when South Australia won the Sheffield Shield. He was dropped from South Australia's list at the end of the season.

== Personal life ==
As of 2025, Brazell was studying a Bachelor of Medical Radiation Science degree.
