= Blake Macdonald (cricketer) =

Australian cricketer

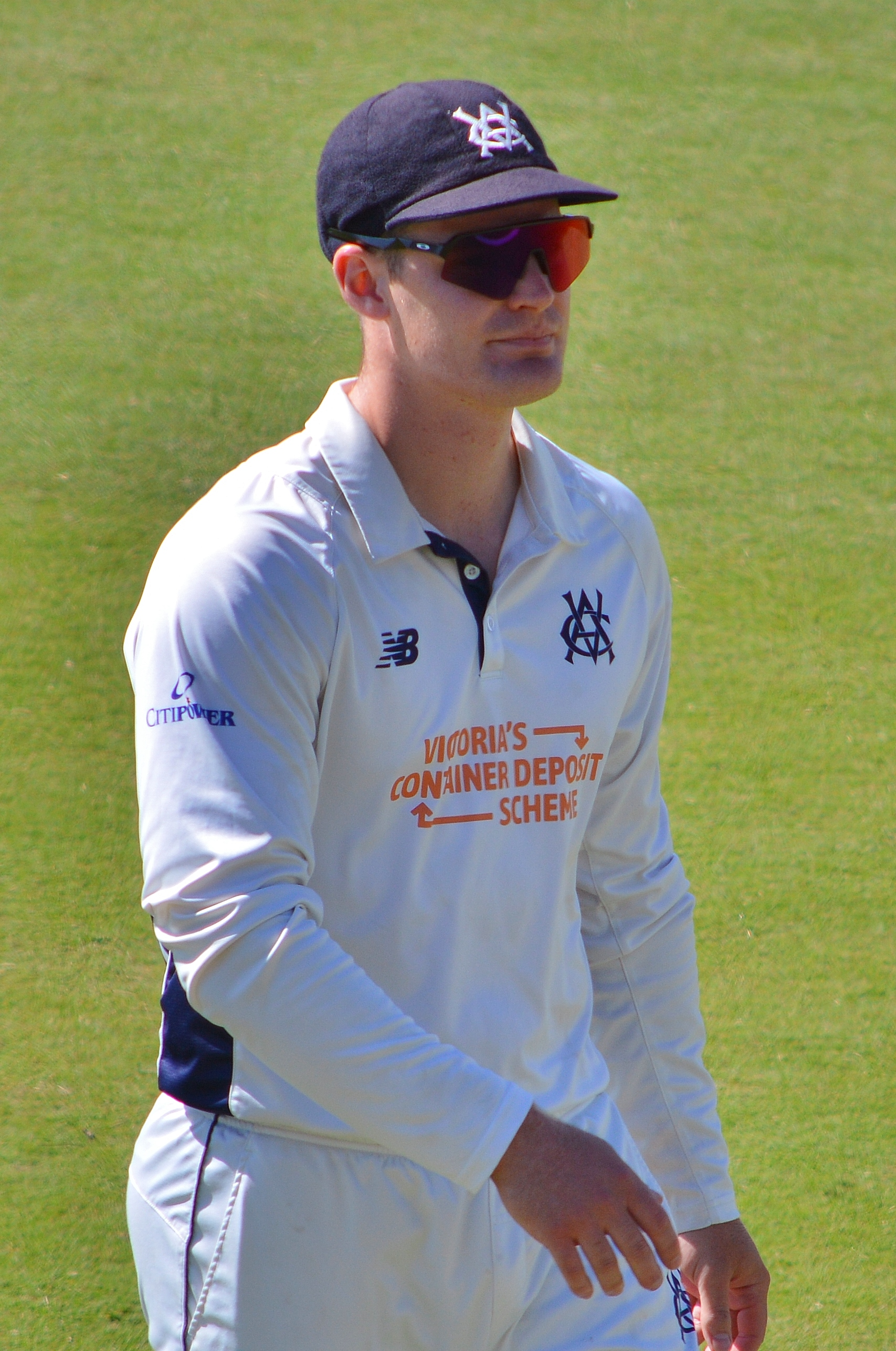
- Macdonald playing First Class cricket with Victoria in March 2026

Personal information
- Full name: Blake Duncan Macdonald
- Born: 23 February 1998 (age 28); Canberra, Australian Capital Territory, Australia
- Batting: Right-handed
- Bowling: Right-arm medium
- Role: Batsman

Domestic team information
- Years: Team
- 2023/24: New South Wales
- 2024/25–: Victoria
- 2025/26–: Melbourne Stars

Career statistics
Competition	FC	LA	T20
Matches	11	9	10
Runs scored	554	283	238
Batting average	27.70	35.37	29.75
100s/50s	1/3	0/1	0/1
Top score	109*	81	59
Catches/stumpings	13/–	3/–	3/–
- Source: Cricinfo, 3 October 2026

Blake Duncan Macdonald (born 23 February 1998) is an Australian cricketer who plays Australian domestic cricket for Victoria, having previously played for New South Wales.

== Career ==
Macdonald captained the ACT/NSW Country team to second place at the 2014/15 Under 17 National Championships, where he was named in the team of the carnival and was subsequently selected for the Under 19 Championships. He made his first grade debut in ACT Grade Cricket for Western District UC Cricket Club the same season.

In the 2017/18 season, Macdonald began playing for St George Cricket Club in NSW Premier Cricket after being contacted by former Australian test cricketer and club captain Trent Copeland.

In November 2022, while playing for a combined NSW/ACT team, Macdonald scored an unbeaten 177 in a tour match against the West Indies.

He made his first-class debut on 14 March 2023 for New South Wales in the 2022–23 Sheffield Shield, scoring 21 and 61. Shortly afterwards, Macdonald received his first state contract with New South Wales ahead of the 2023/24 season. He made his List A debut on 4 November 2023 for New South Wales in the 2023–24 Marsh One-Day Cup, scoring 81 in a Player of the Match winning performance as his team successfully chased Western Australia's 221 from 43 overs.

Having been delisted after one season at New South Wales, Macdonald moved to Victoria to join the St Kilda Cricket Club in Victorian Premier Cricket, in the hopes of breaking through into the Victorian team. After impressing early in the season with St Kilda, Macdonald was signed to the Melbourne Stars for the 2024-25 Big Bash League season, however he didn't make an appearance. Despite this, Macdonald broke into Victoria's Sheffield Shield team for the final two rounds of the season.

Macdonald made his maiden first class century for Victoria the following season, in a match against Western Australia at the Melbourne Cricket Ground, scoring 109 not out in a run chase.

== Personal life ==
Macdonald obtained a Bachelor of Science at the University of Canberra, majoring in psychology. He is the son of former cricketer Darryle Macdonald. As of 2024, he has been in a relationship with Kirsten Parker, a Registered Nurse.
