= Dylan McLachlan =

Australian cricketer (born 1999)

Personal information
- Full name: Dylan Peter McLachlan
- Born: 14 January 1999 (age 27)
- Batting: Right-handed
- Role: Wicket-keeper batsman

Domestic team information
- Years: Team
- 2023/24, 2026/27–present: Queensland

Career statistics
Competition	List A
Matches	4
Runs scored	127
Batting average	42.33
100s/50s	0/1
Top score	66*
Catches/stumpings	2/–
- Source: ESPNCricinfo, 18 October 2026

Dylan Peter McLachlan (born 14 January 1999) is an Australian cricketer who is contracted to Queensland. He is a wicket-keeper batsman, who plays for Queensland cricket team in domestic cricket. He played club cricket for Valley District Cricket Club. He made his List A debut for Queensland on 14 February 2024, against South Australia in the 2023–24 Marsh One-Day Cup. A former student of Marist College Ashgrove, he is the first Indigenous player to represent Queensland since Brendan Doggett and Mikayla Hinkley.
