= Toby Gray =

Australian cricketer

Personal information
- Full name: Toby William Gray
- Born: 16 October 2001 (age 25); Waratah, New South Wales
- Batting: Right-handed
- Bowling: Legbreak
- Role: Bowler

Domestic team information
- Years: Team
- 2022/23–: New South Wales
- 2022/23–: Sydney Thunder

Career statistics
| Competition | FC | T20 |
|---|---|---|
| Matches | 1 | 1 |
| Runs scored | 6 | 10 |
| Batting average | 3.00 | 10.00 |
| 100s/50s | 0/0 | 0/0 |
| Top score | 4 | 10 |
| Balls bowled | 168 | 12 |
| Wickets | 3 | 1 |
| Bowling average | 34.66 | 18.00 |
| 5 wickets in innings | 0 | 0 |
| 10 wickets in match | 0 | 0 |
| Best bowling | 3/58 | 1/18 |
| Catches/stumpings | 1/– | 0/– |
- Source: ESPNcricinfo, 28 December 2022

Toby William Gray (born 16 October 2001) is an Australian cricketer, who plays for the New South Wales cricket team in Sheffield Shield. He made his first-class debut on 22 November 2022, for New South Wales in the 2022–23 Sheffield Shield season. He marked his debut by picking up three wickets. He is a talented leg spinner, who was named in the Sydney Thunder's squad as a replacement player for the 2022–23 Big Bash League season following his impressive Sheffield Shield debut.
