= Ryan Hackney =

Australian cricketer (born 1999)

Personal information
- Born: 15 July 1999 (age 27)
- Batting: Left-handed
- Bowling: Slow left arm orthodox
- Role: Batsman

Domestic team information
- Years: Team
- 2021/22–2024/25: New South Wales
- FC debut: 9 February 2022 New South Wales v Queensland Cricket

Career statistics
Competition	First-class
Matches	12
Runs scored	430
Batting average	20.47
100s/50s	1/1
Top score	102
Catches/stumpings	11/–
- Source: ESPNCricinfo, 18 October 2023

Ryan Hackney (born 15 July 1999) is an Australian cricketer who plays for New South Wales. A left-handed batsman, he made his first-class debut for New South Wales on 9 February 2022 against Queensland.

== Early life ==
From Springwood, New South Wales, he attended St Columba's Catholic College. Hackney made his first grade cricket debut aged 16 years-old for Penrith District Cricket Club in Sydney. Hackney studied sports management part-time through Deakin University. As a youngster playing for Faulconbridge, Hackney broke the run scoring record of Matthew Wade at domestic under-19 level, scoring 1104 runs as an 18-year-old during the 2017–18 season. He subsequently earned a call up to the Australia national under-19 cricket team and a rookie contract with NSW Blues.

== Career ==
Hackney made his New South Wales debut in February 2022 against Queensland Cricket in the Sheffield Shield. He gained further first team opportunities after averaging 60 for the New South Wales second-XI during the 2022–23 season. He scored his maiden first-class century in March 2023 against South Australia.
