= Blake Edwards (cricketer) =

Australian cricketer (born 1999)

Personal information
- Born: 26 October 1999 (age 27)

Career statistics
Competition	First-class	List A
Matches	4	3
Runs scored	10	20
Batting average	5.00	20.00
100s/50s	0/0	0/0
Top score	8	18
Balls bowled	519	125
Wickets	7	3
Bowling average	47.28	39.66
5 wickets in innings	0	0
10 wickets in match	0	0
Best bowling	3/95	3/30
Catches/stumpings	1/–	1/–
- Source: Cricinfo, 14 February 2023

Blake Edwards (born 26 October 1999) is an Australian cricketer. He made his first-class debut on 12 November 2019, for Queensland in the 2019–20 Sheffield Shield season. In January 2020, he was named in the Cricket Australia XI team to face the England Lions. In June 2020, he was upgraded to a full contract for Queensland ahead of the 2020–21 domestic season.
