= Jayden Goodwin =

Australian cricketer (born 2001)

Personal information
- Born: 13 December 2001 (age 24); Perth, Western Australia, Australia
- Batting: Left-handed
- Bowling: Legbreak googly
- Role: Batsman
- Relatives: Murray Goodwin (father)

Domestic team information
- Years: Team
- 2021/22–: Western Australia (squad no. 7)
- First-class debut: 10 November 2021 WA v Qld
- List A debut: 13 February 2025 WA v SA

Career statistics
Competition	FC	List A
Matches	26	2
Runs scored	1,391	30
Batting average	30.23	15.00
100s/50s	2/8	0/0
Top score	139	24
Catches/stumpings	17/–	1/–
- Source: Cricinfo, 23 October 2026

Jayden Goodwin (born 13 December 2001) is an Australian cricketer. He made his first-class debut on 10 November 2021, for Western Australia in the 2021–22 Sheffield Shield season.

His father, Murray, played Test cricket for Zimbabwe.

After playing for Western Australia at age division levels, Goodwin decided to take a two-year break from cricket in 2019 to fulfill his Mormon Mission in Zimbabwe. However he returned to Australia in 2020 due to the travel restrictions amidst the COVID-19 pandemic, and made his first-class debut the following year. He replaced Sam Whiteman in the squad, who was ruled out due to delayed onset concussion.
