= Aryan Jain =

Australian cricketer (born 1997)

Personal information
- Born: 26 June 1997 (age 29)
- Batting: Left-handed
- Bowling: Left-arm fast

Domestic team information
- Years: Team
- 2023–: Queensland
- FC debut: 21 February 2023 Queensland v New South Wales

Career statistics
Competition	First-class
Matches	2
Runs scored	76
Batting average	25.33
100s/50s	0/0
Top score	44*
Catches/stumpings	0/–
- Source: CricInfo, 5 October 2023

Aryan Jain (born 26 June 1997) is an Australian cricketer. He is a left-handed batsman and left-arm fast bowler. He made his first-class cricket debut on 21 February 2023, against New South Wales.

== Early life ==
Both his parents were born in India. Jain played under-19 cricket for Queensland growing up. Between 2016 and 2019, Jain moved to London to study at the London School of Economics and played club cricket for Bexley in the Kent Cricket League. On his return to Australia he played for his Premier Cricket club, South Brisbane and the Queensland second-XI, for whom he scored four half-centuries in three matches during the 2019–20 season. In 2021, he was hired by financial firm Ernst & Young but resigned in 2023 to pursue cricket.

== Career ==
Jain made his first-class cricket debut for Queensland Cricket on 21 February 2023 against New South Wales. In his second first-class match he was part of an unbeaten 127-run second innings stand with Bryce Street to secure a draw against Tasmania, and set a new high first-class score of 44 not out from 99 balls. He was retained on a rookie contract for the 2023–24 season by Queensland.
