= Bradley Hope =

Australian cricketer (born 1999)

Personal information
- Full name: Bradley Mark Hope
- Born: 13 July 1999 (age 27); Perth, Western Australia, Australia
- Height: 1.87 m (6 ft 2 in)
- Batting: Right-handed
- Bowling: Right-arm medium
- Role: All-rounder

Domestic team information
- Years: Team
- 2018/19: Western Australia
- 2019/20: Cricket Australia XI
- 2021/22–present: Tasmania (squad no. 30)

Career statistics
Competition	FC	LA
Matches	28	15
Runs scored	1,129	155
Batting average	25.65	17.22
100s/50s	2/6	0/0
Top score	132*	49*
Balls bowled	2,301	258
Wickets	30	6
Bowling average	47.83	52.66
5 wickets in innings	0	0
10 wickets in match	0	0
Best bowling	4/51	3/40
Catches/stumpings	13/–	5/–
- Source: ESPNcricinfo, 18 October 2026

Bradley Mark Hope (born 13 July 1999) is an Australian cricketer. He made his first-class debut for Western Australia in the 2018–19 Sheffield Shield season on 23 February 2019. In January 2020, he was named in the Cricket Australia XI team to face the England Lions. He made his List A debut on 24 November 2021, for Tasmania in the 2021–22 Marsh One-Day Cup.
