= Cameron Bancroft =

Australian cricketer (born 1992)

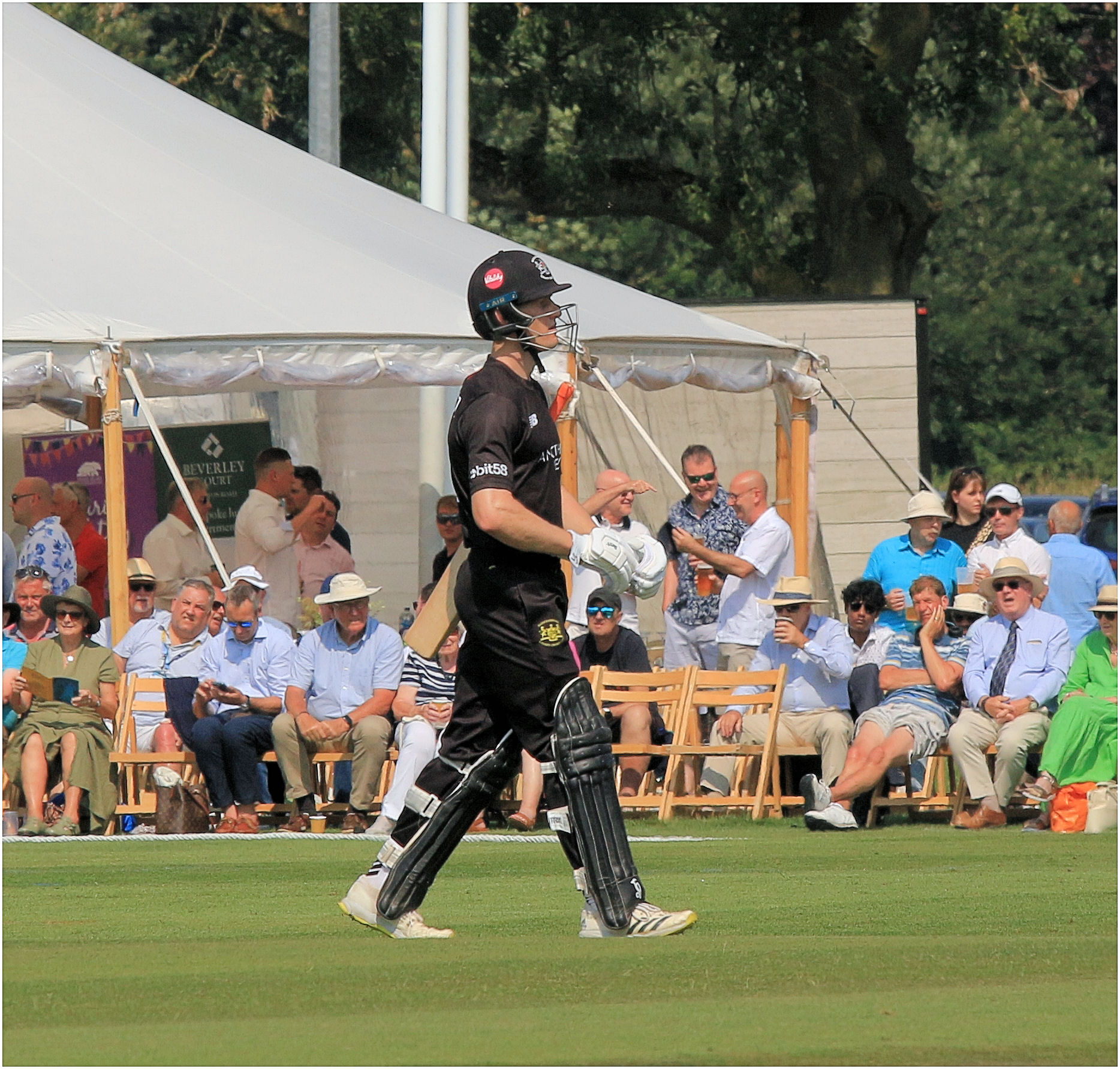
- Bancroft playing for Gloucestershire in 2024

Personal information
- Full name: Cameron Timothy Bancroft
- Born: 19 November 1992 (age 34); Attadale, Western Australia
- Nickname: Bangers
- Height: 1.82 m (6 ft 0 in)
- Batting: Right-handed
- Bowling: Right-arm off break
- Role: Wicket-keeper-batter

International information
- National side: Australia (2016–2019)
- Test debut (cap 451): 23 November 2017 v England
- Last Test: 14 August 2019 v England
- Only T20I (cap 79): 31 January 2016 v India

Domestic team information
- Years: Team
- 2011/12–present: Western Australia
- 2014/15–2022/23: Perth Scorchers
- 2016–2017: Gloucestershire
- 2019–2021: Durham
- 2023: Somerset
- 2023/24–present: Sydney Thunder
- 2024–present: Gloucestershire

Career statistics
Competition	Test	T20I	FC	LA
Matches	10	1	203	126
Runs scored	446	0	13,032	4,219
Batting average	26.23	–	37.77	40.96
100s/50s	0/3	0/0	33/54	6/27
Top score	82*	0*	228*	176
Balls bowled	–	–	66	–
Wickets	–	–	2	–
Bowling average	–	–	38.50	–
5 wickets in innings	–	–	0	–
10 wickets in match	–	–	0	–
Best bowling	–	–	1/10	–
Catches/stumpings	16/–	1/–	321/1	97/2
- Source: ESPNcricinfo, 25 October 2026

Cameron Timothy Bancroft (born 19 November 1992) is an Australian cricketer contracted to Western Australia in Australian first class cricket, Gloucestershire in English first class cricket, and the Sydney Thunder in the Big Bash League. He made his Test debut for the Australian national team in November 2017.

As a result of a Cricket Australia investigation into a ball tampering incident during the 3rd Test against South Africa in March 2018, Bancroft and two others, captain Steve Smith and vice-captain David Warner, were charged by Cricket Australia on 27 March 2018 with bringing the game into disrepute, suspended, and sent home from the tour. The next day, as a result of his involvement in the ball tampering incident, Cricket Australia banned Bancroft from all international and domestic cricket for nine months and from any leadership role in Australian cricket for an additional year. Bancroft made his return to cricket on 30 December 2018, playing for the Perth Scorchers in the 2018–19 Big Bash League season. Bancroft scored 138 not out on his Sheffield Shield return as well.

== Youth career and pre-international debut ==
After playing under-17, under-19 and under-23 cricket for Western Australia, Bancroft played several under-19 Tests and One Day Internationals for the Australia Under-19 cricket team, impressing by scoring three centuries at an average of 50.90. In August 2012, Bancroft played in the 2012 ICC Under-19 Cricket World Cup, where he scored the second highest number of runs.

He made his List A debut for Western Australia against Tasmania on 16 October 2011 and his first-class debut one week later.

== International career ==
In 2015, Bancroft was selected in the Australian Test squad to tour Bangladesh; however, that tour was cancelled for security reasons. Bancroft and the rest of the team members returned to their respective states.

He made his Twenty20 International debut for Australia against India on 31 January 2016, but did not face a ball in Australia’s innings. It remains his only T20I appearance.

In November 2017, he was named in Australia's Test squad for the 2017–18 Ashes series. Bancroft replaced Matt Renshaw as an opening batsman and became the first Australian opener to make his debut in an Ashes Test since Michael Slater in 1993.

Bancroft's baggy green cap was presented to him by Geoff Marsh. In his first Test innings, he scored 5 and 82 not out to help secure Australia's 10-wicket victory against England. He played in all five Tests in that series.

=== Ball-tampering incident and suspension ===
Bancroft was selected for the 2018 tour of South Africa and played in the first three Tests. In March 2018, he admitted to ball-tampering in the third Test match, held in Cape Town. During the match, television footage showed Bancroft rubbing the ball with sandpaper. On discovering that footage of the incident had been broadcast, Bancroft put the sandpaper down the front of his trousers, before being spoken to by the on-field umpires.

At a later press conference, captain Steve Smith admitted that the plan to tamper with the ball was concocted by the team "leadership group." The ICC later imposed a one-match ban on Smith and handed Bancroft three demerit points. Cricket Australia then imposed further sanctions against Bancroft, Smith and David Warner, meaning they would not take part in the fourth Test. Cricket Australia launched a separate investigation into the incident as a matter of urgency.

Cricket Australia CEO James Sutherland announced that, as a result of the preliminary investigation into the incident, Smith, Warner and Bancroft had been charged with bringing the game into disrepute, suspended and sent home. Warner was later found to be responsible for developing the plan to tamper with the ball and instructing Bancroft on how to do it. Bancroft was found to have carried out those instructions, tried to conceal evidence and misled match officials by denying knowledge of the tampering. As a result, Bancroft received a 9-month ban from international and domestic cricket in Australia and was banned from any leadership role for 1 further year after the initial ban was completed.

Somerset County Cricket Club announced that Bancroft would not be joining the county as its overseas player for the 2018 season, as had been planned.

=== Return to cricket ===
Bancroft made a return to professional cricket on 30 December 2018, playing for the Perth Scorchers in the 2018–19 Big Bash League season. In the match, he scored two runs from three balls, with the Hobart Hurricanes going on to win the game by 6 wickets. Bancroft went on to make 296 runs in 10 games in the season, including a career best score of 87 not out during a game against the Sydney Sixers, for which he was awarded man of the match.

In February 2019, Bancroft returned to first-class cricket, playing for Western Australia against New South Wales in the 2018–19 Sheffield Shield. He made an unbeaten 138 in the first innings and 86 in the second. Bancroft faced a total of 621 balls in the match, falling 28 balls short of former Australian captain Steve Waugh's record of most balls faced in a Shield match.

Later in the year, he was appointed captain of Durham County Cricket Club in England for the 2019 season. While the move to make him captain was criticised by some members of the public, it was supported by Durham director of cricket Marcus North as well as former Australian captain, teammate and fellow ball-tampering conspirator, Steve Smith. In his one-day debut for Durham against Northamptonshire, Bancroft scored 150 not out off 130 balls.

The aftermath of the ball-tampering scandal and the challenges of returning to professional cricket took a toll on Bancroft's mental health. He openly discussed his struggles, as well as the pressures and expectations faced by professional athletes.

=== 2019 Ashes series ===
In July 2019, Bancroft was named in Australia's squad for the 2019 Ashes series in England. He made his international return in the first Test at Edgbaston at the beginning of August. He played the first two Tests, scoring 8, 7, 13 and 16, and was dropped for the third Test.

=== Pursuit of a recall ===
Following his omission from the test team during the 2019 Ashes, Bancroft's form dipped dramatically, resulting in him being omitted from Western Australia's Sheffield Shield team the following summer after a poor return of 158 runs from 13 innings at an average of 13.16.

In following seasons, Bancroft managed to turn his form around, being the highest aggregate run scorer in the 2022-23 Sheffield Shield, scoring 945 runs at an average of 59.06, and then the second top run scorer in the 2023-24 Sheffield Shield with 778 runs at 48.62. This sustained period of good form made Bancroft one of the leading contenders to open the batting for Australia in test cricket following David Warner's retirement in early 2024. However, Bancroft suffered another dramatic form slump in the first half of the 2024-25 season, ruining his chances of selection for the upcoming Border-Gavaskar Trophy series.

In January 2025, Bancroft collided with Daniel Sams going for a catch in the outfield whilst playing in a BBL match for the Sydney Thunder against the Perth Scorchers. Their heads collided, and both were treated for concussion. Bancroft was left with a broken shoulder and nose, however was able to walk off the field. Sams, however, was knocked unconscious, exhibiting the fencing response, and was stretchered off the ground. Both were taken to hospital, diagnosed with concussion, and discharged the following afternoon. Sams was cleared of any fractures, however he was ruled out for at least the next 12 days under the Cricket Australia concussion protocol. Bancroft was sidelined for "an extended period" due to his fractures.

In February 2025, Bancroft was named Gloucestershire red-ball captain for the 2025 County Championship season.

=== Recall of sandpapergate ===
On 18th November 2026, Bancroft published an article in The West Australian stating that there were others in the team that knew about the use of sandpaper during the test that led up to the 2018 Australian ball-tampering scandal.

"It was not just the three of us - Steve Smith, David Warner and I - who knew about me using sandpaper on the ball in South Africa. It was the whole team."

"It made me feel angry, betrayed and alone."

"What I saw, experienced and lived with - not only him, but everyone else on that tour in South Africa - is not the public account he gave in his press conference and in the years previously when he has spoken on this time."

— Bancroft
