= Gabe Bell =

Australian cricketer (born 1995)

Personal information
- Full name: Gabriel Teague Bell
- Born: 3 July 1995 (age 31); Trevallyn, Tasmania, Australia
- Height: 1.95 m (6 ft 5 in)
- Batting: Right-handed
- Bowling: Right-arm medium
- Role: Bowler

Domestic team information
- Years: Team
- 2016/17–present: Tasmania (squad no. 5)
- 2026: Gloucestershire (squad no. 5)

Career statistics
Competition	First-class	List A
Matches	63	4
Runs scored	477	29
Batting average	7.95	29.00
100s/50s	0/0	0/0
Top score	35*	17
Balls bowled	12,546	192
Wickets	238	8
Bowling average	25.52	16.62
5 wickets in innings	4	0
10 wickets in match	1	0
Best bowling	6/39	3/29
Catches/stumpings	21/–	0/–
- Source: ESPNcricinfo, 23 October 2026

Gabriel Teague Bell (born 3 July 1995) is an Australian cricketer. He made his first-class debut for Tasmania in the 2016–17 Sheffield Shield season on 16 March 2017. He made his List A debut for Tasmania in the 2018–19 JLT One-Day Cup on 6 October 2018.
