= Daniel Drew (cricketer) =

Australian cricketer (born 1996)

Personal information
- Full name: Daniel Robert Drew
- Born: 22 May 1996 (age 30); Adelaide, South Australia
- Batting: Right-handed
- Bowling: Right-arm off break
- Role: Batter

Domestic team information
- Years: Team
- 2019/20–2025/26: South Australia (squad no. 47)
- 2021/22: Adelaide Strikers (squad no. 47)
- 2024/25: Brisbane Heat (squad no. 96)

Career statistics
Competition	FC	LA	T20
Matches	23	17	5
Runs scored	1,205	563	61
Batting average	29.39	40.21	20.33
100s/50s	2/3	2/3	0/0
Top score	208*	120	23*
Catches/stumpings	17/–	3/–	0/–
- Source: Cricinfo, 26 March 2026

Daniel Robert Drew (born 22 May 1996) is a former Australian professional cricketer who played for South Australia as a right-handed top order batter.

== Career ==
Following a dominant season in South Australian Premier Cricket for West Torrens Cricket Club, Drew was awarded a rookie contract with South Australia as an all-rounder ahead of the 2017/18 domestic season. However, he did not play and was removed from the contract list at the conclusion of the season. He made his first-class debut on 7 December 2019, for South Australia in the 2019–20 Sheffield Shield season. Despite playing a single match, he was awarded a full contract with South Australia in 2020.

He made his Twenty20 debut on 7 December 2021, for the Adelaide Strikers in the 2021–22 Big Bash League season. On 10 February 2022, Drew scored his maiden first-class century against Victoria in his second match, ending the innings on 130 runs from 317 deliveries.

During round 7 of the 2022–23 Sheffield Shield season, he scored an unbeaten double century against Western Australia with 208 runs. Later that month, he made his List A debut against Victoria as part of the 2022–23 Marsh One-Day Cup. At the conclusion of the season, Drew was named as part of Cricket Australia's team of the tournament and was the top scorer for South Australia with 656 runs at an average of 43.73. On 26 September 2023, Drew scored his maiden List A century with 120 runs against Western Australia.

Drew was delisted by South Australia at the end of the 2025-26 season.
