= Will Salzmann =

Australian cricketer (born 2003)

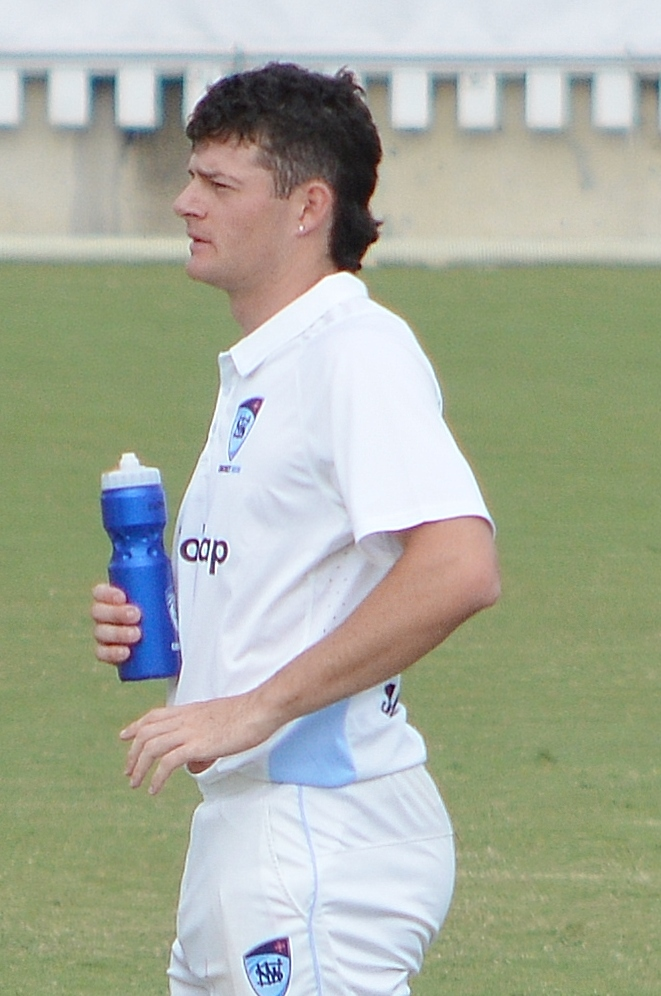
- Salzmann playing First Class cricket with New South Wales in October 2025

Personal information
- Full name: William Salzmann
- Born: 19 November 2003 (age 23)
- Batting: Right-handed
- Bowling: Right-arm fast-medium
- Role: All-rounder

Domestic team information
- Years: Team
- 2022/23–present: New South Wales (squad no. 19)

Career statistics
Competition	FC	List A
Matches	9	11
Runs scored	426	188
Batting average	30.42	47.00
100s/50s	0/3	0/1
Top score	73	70*
Balls bowled	168	349
Wickets	0	17
Bowling average	–	23.35
5 wickets in innings	0	0
10 wickets in match	0	0
Best bowling	–	4/48
Catches/stumpings	5/–	5/–
- Source: CricInfo, 25 October 2026

William Salzmann (born 19 November 2003) is an Australian cricketer who plays for New South Wales. He is a right-handed batsman and right-arm medium-fast bowler. He made his List A cricket debut for New South Wales on 23 September 2022 against Victoria, and his first-class debut on 4 October 2025 against Western Australia.

== Early life ==
From Tahmoor, in Macarthur, New South Wales, Salzmann plays club cricket for Campbelltown Camden District Cricket Club. He featured as NSW Metro won the 2022 national under-19 championships; although injury prevented him from bowling he impressed as a batsman, having a top score of 96 and hitting the winning runs in the grand final with a six.

== Career ==
Salzmann signed a rookie contract with New South Wales cricket team in May 2022. He made his List A cricket debut for NSW on 23 September 2022 against Victoria. He took a wicket with his third ball in professional cricket, to dismiss Mackenzie Harvey. In November 2023, whilst still a teenager, Salzmann took four wickets to help New South Wales beat Western Australia cricket team in the 2023–24 Marsh One-Day Cup.

On his first-class debut, in the first round of the 2025–26 Sheffield Shield season, Salzmann made 43 and 72, top-scoring in each innings for New South Wales, who defeated Western Australia by 74 runs.

== International career ==
Salzmann played at the 2022 Under-19 Cricket World Cup held in the Caribbean, where he was the leading wicket-taker for Australia U19 as they reached the semi-finals.
