= Ashley Chandrasinghe =

Australian cricketer

Personal information
- Full name: Ashley Philip Chandrasinghe
- Born: 17 December 2001 (age 24); Carlton, Victoria, Australia
- Nickname: Ash
- Batting: Left-handed
- Role: Top order batter

Domestic team information
- Years: Team
- 2022/23–present: Victoria

Career statistics
| Competition | FC |
|---|---|
| Matches | 14 |
| Runs scored | 517 |
| Batting average | 22.47 |
| 100s/50s | 1/2 |
| Top score | 119* |
| Balls bowled | 35 |
| Wickets | 2 |
| Bowling average | 15.00 |
| 5 wickets in innings | 0 |
| 10 wickets in match | 0 |
| Best bowling | 2/30 |
| Catches/stumpings | 14/0 |
- Source: ESPNcricinfo, 19 November 2026

Ashley Philip Chandrasinghe (born 17 December 2001) is an Australian domestic cricketer who plays first-class cricket for the Victoria in the Sheffield Shield. He is a left handed batsman.

== Early life ==
Chandrasinghe attended Berwick Grammar School in Officer, Victoria.

== Career ==
He made his debut for Casey-South Melbourne Cricket Club in the 2019–20 season and marked his debut with a century. He made his debut for the Victoria Second XI in November 2021. He played cricket in Darwin when Victoria was out of season. In August 2022 Chandrasinghe set a new record by hitting five consecutive centuries in the Darwin Premier League. Such was his form with Waratah he was awarded the Ralph Wiese Medal in September 2022.

Chandrasinghe was awarded a rookie contract with Victoria for the 2022–23 after his 2021–22 season with the Victorian Second XI saw he score 423 runs at an average of 84.60. He made his first-class debut for Victoria on 28 October, 2022 in the Sheffield Shield against Tasmania at the Blundstone Arena, Hobart. He replaced Will Pucovski in the side. He finished day one 63 not out after sharing a 157-run partnership for the third wicket with Victoria captain Peter Handscomb. On the second day he completed his debut century and finished 119 not out as Victoria declared on 7/351.

Opening the batting for Victoria in the 2022–23 Sheffield Shield Final against Western Australia, Chandrasinghe batted for approaching seven hours, to score 46 not out, becoming the first man to carry his bat in a Sheffield Shield final since Jamie Cox in 1998. Chandrasinghe faced 280 balls and hit four boundaries as Victoria was bowled out for 195. The innings solidified Chandrasinghe's reputation through the early years of career as a solid but slow-scoring defensive opening batsman.

Chandrasinghe won the John Scholes Medal as man of the match in the 2023–24 Victorian Premier Cricket final, scoring 53 & 103* and carrying his bat in the second innings in Casey-South Melbourne's reverse outright loss against Carlton.

== Personal life ==
He is of Sri Lankan ancestry.
