= Iain Carlisle =

Australian cricketer

Personal information
- Full name: Iain James Carlisle
- Born: 5 January 2000 (age 26); Canberra, Australian Capital Territory, Australia
- Height: 1.92 m (6 ft 4 in)
- Batting: Left-handed
- Bowling: Right-arm fast
- Role: Bowler

Domestic team information
- Years: Team
- 2022/23–present: Tasmania (squad no. 35)

Career statistics
Competition	FC	LA
Matches	5	5
Runs scored	52	1
Batting average	10.40	N/A
100s/50s	0/0	0/0
Top score	24	1*
Balls bowled	968	180
Wickets	21	7
Bowling average	24.80	27.00
5 wickets in innings	0	0
10 wickets in match	0	–
Best bowling	4/68	3/39
Catches/stumpings	2/–	5/–
- Source: ESPNcricinfo, 21 October 2025

Iain James Carlisle (born 5 January 2000) is an Australian cricketer. He is currently signed to Tasmania in domestic cricket and to the Hobart Hurricanes in the Big Bash League.

== Career ==
Originally from Canberra, Carlisle was raised in Wollongong where he then moved to Sydney, playing for Campbelltown-Camden District Cricket Club in the first grade NSW Premier Cricket competition. In 2017, following successful performances in the Under-17 NSW Metro Championships and for Cricket Australia XI in the Under-19 National Championships, Carlisle was selected as part of an under-19 series against Sri Lanka.

In November 2017, Carlisle was selected as part of the preliminary squad for Australia's squad in the 2018 Under-19 Cricket World Cup, however he was not selected in the final 15-player squad. Carlisle was awarded a rookie contract with Tasmania for the 2019–20 season due to a lack of cricket opportunities in New South Wales.

In December 2022, he was signed to the Hobart Hurricanes. He made his List A debut for Tasmania against Western Australia on 26 February 2023 during the 2022–23 Marsh One-Day Cup. Additionally, he made his first-class debut for Tasmania against Queensland on 14 March 2023 during the 2022–23 Sheffield Shield season. In July 2023 he was re-signed to the Hobart Hurricanes, but didn't get a chance to play for the franchise. Then he was again re-signed to same franchise in In July 2024.
