= Jordan Buckingham =

Australian cricketer

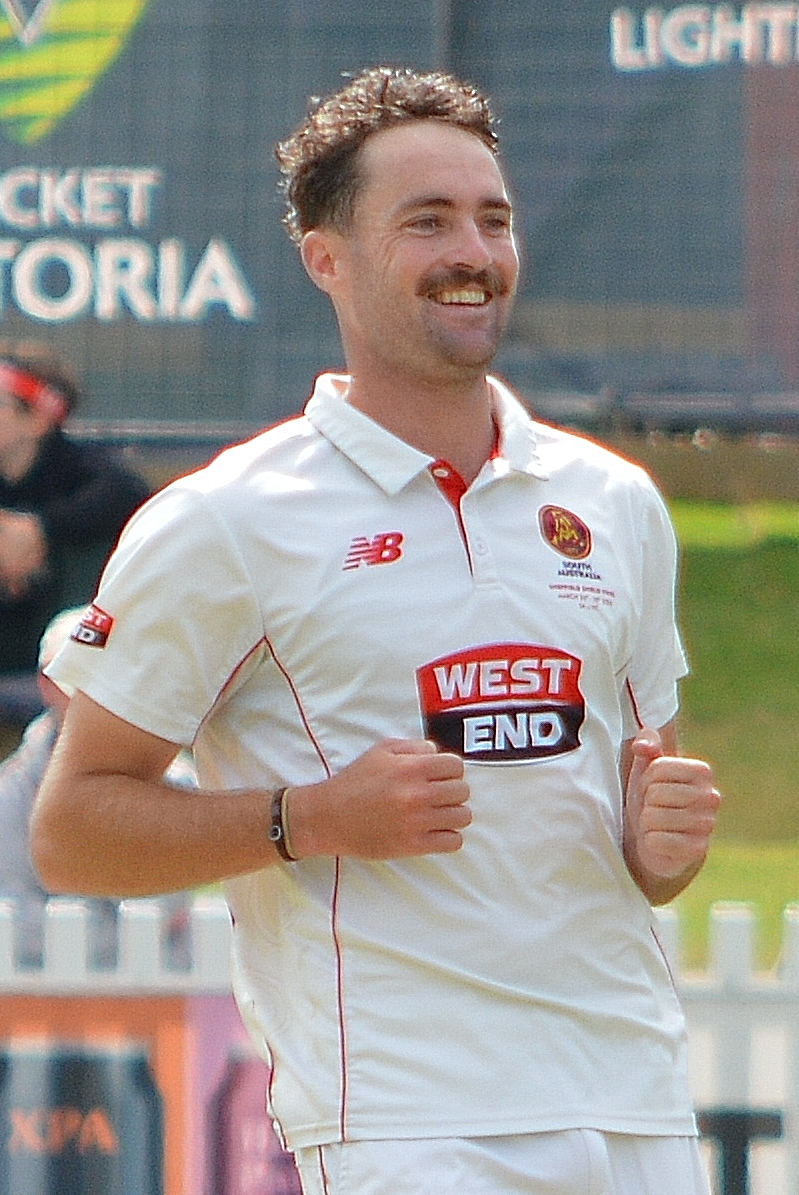
- Buckingham playing First Class cricket for South Australia in March 2026

Personal information
- Full name: Jordan Steven Dermott Buckingham
- Born: 17 March 2000 (age 26); Bundoora, Victoria, Australia
- Height: 192 cm (6 ft 4 in)
- Batting: Right-handed
- Bowling: Right-arm fast-medium
- Role: Bowler

Domestic team information
- Years: Team
- 2021/22–present: South Australia (squad no. 21)
- 2023: Northamptonshire (squad no. 32)
- 2024/25–present: Adelaide Strikers (squad no. 21)
- 2025: Yorkshire

Career statistics
Competition	FC	LA	T20
Matches	37	11	3
Runs scored	97	31	0
Batting average	3.73	10.33	–
100s/50s	0/0	0/0	0/0
Top score	17	15*	0*
Balls bowled	6373	531	60
Wickets	122	16	2
Bowling average	29.40	30.06	48.00
5 wickets in innings	4	1	0
10 wickets in match	0	0	0
Best bowling	7/71	6/41	1/23
Catches/stumpings	20/–	1/–	1/–
- Source: ESPNCricinfo, 20 September 2026

Jordan Steven Dermott Buckingham (born 17 March 2000) is an Australian cricketer, who is a right-arm fast-medium bowler. He plays for South Australia cricket team in domestic cricket.

== Career ==
He made his first-class debut for South Australia against New South Wales on 23 March 2022 during the 2021–22 Sheffield Shield season. In December 2022, Buckingham was selected to play for Cricket Australia XI against South Africa as part of the 2022 South African tour of Australia.

In April 2023, Buckingham earned his maiden call-up to the Australia A cricket team for their first-class series against New Zealand. On 9 April 2023, in the second unofficial Test, he took his maiden five-wicket haul in first-class cricket. In May 2023, he signed to play for Northamptonshire County Cricket Club in the 2023 County Championship as a replacement for Lance Morris.

He made his List A debut against Queensland on 28 September 2023, although the match was abandoned before the toss due to bad weather. In December 2023, he was called up to replace Michael Neser for the Prime Minister's XI in a tour match against Pakistan, returning figures of 5/80 in the first innings.

In February 2024, Buckingham was named in the 2023–24 Marsh One-Day Cup team of the tournament for taking 9 wickets in three matches at an average of 13.88.

Buckingham joined Yorkshire County Cricket Club in March 2025, signing a contract to play in four of the club's 2025 County Championship matches.
