= Fergus O'Neill =

Australian cricketer (born 2001)

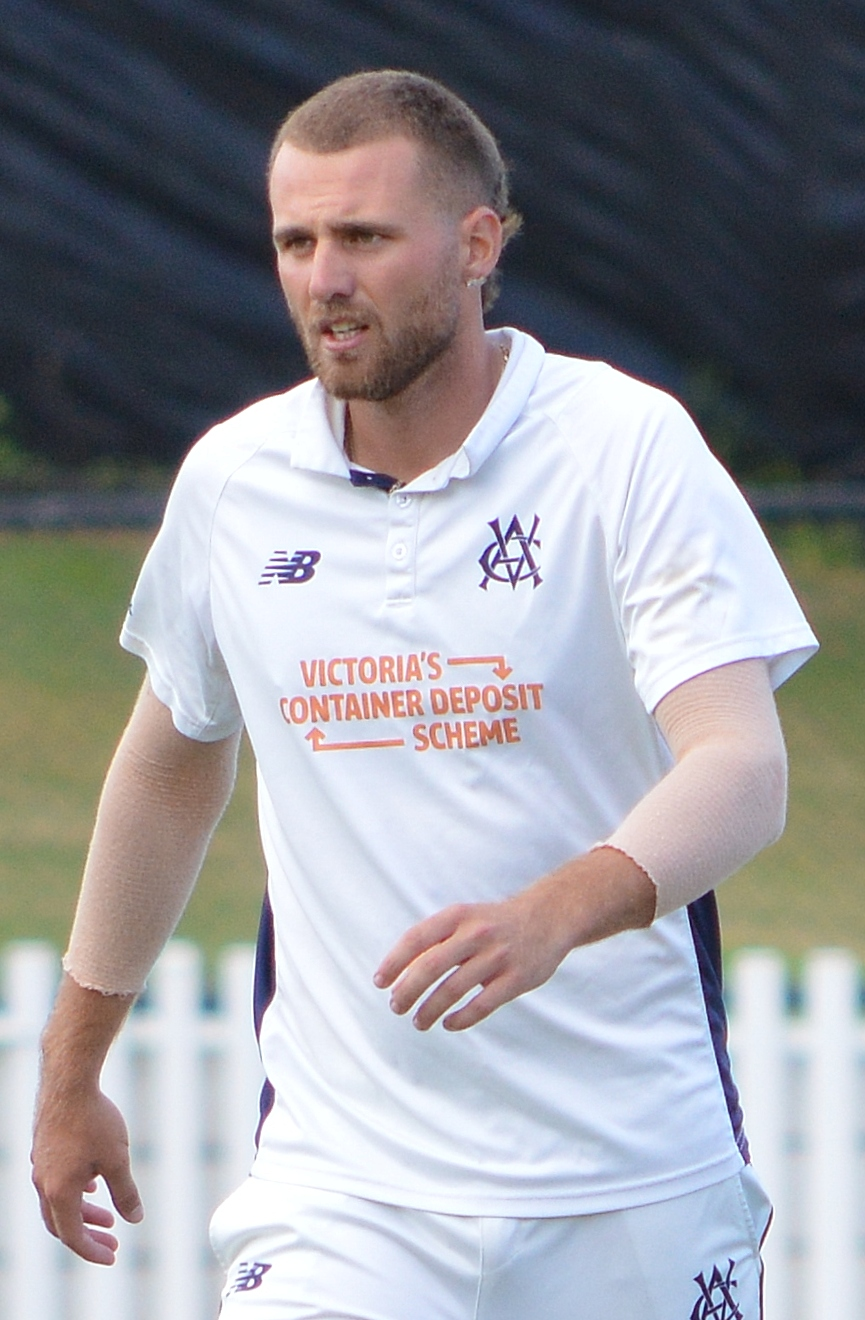
- O'Neill in March 2026

Personal information
- Full name: Fergus Patrick O'Neill
- Born: 27 January 2001 (age 25); Tauranga, New Zealand
- Height: 193 cm (6 ft 4 in)
- Batting: Right-handed
- Bowling: Right-arm fast-medium
- Role: Bowling all rounder

Domestic team information
- Years: Team
- 2021/22–present: Victoria (squad no. 17)
- 2023/24–2025/26: Melbourne Renegades (squad no. 9)
- 2025–present: Nottinghamshire

Career statistics
Competition	FC	LA	T20
Matches	52	18	12
Runs scored	1,889	128	60
Batting average	27.37	16.00	10.00
100s/50s	0/9	0/0	0/0
Top score	70*	25*	16*
Balls bowled	9,898	912	231
Wickets	205	29	10
Bowling average	20.09	25.55	30.30
5 wickets in innings	11	0	0
10 wickets in match	1	0	0
Best bowling	6/72	4/22	3/16
Catches/stumpings	17/–	5/–	3/–
- Source: ESPNcricinfo, 23 October 2026

Fergus Patrick O'Neill (born 27 January 2001) is an Australian cricketer who plays domestic cricket for Victoria. He made his List A debut for Victoria against Western Australia in the 2021–22 Marsh One-Day Cup, and his first-class debut in the 2022–23 Sheffield Shield against South Australia. In the 2023–24 Big Bash League season he was signed by the Melbourne Renegades.

== Early life ==
Born in Tauranga, New Zealand, O'Neill was raised in Victoria.

== Career ==
In 2014, O'Neill and his father Peter O'Neill both scored centuries in the same North West Metro Cricket Association match for the Flemington Colts. Peter retired not out on 106, while Fergus was eventually caught for 104. Fergus attended Maribyrnong College, a sports secondary school in Melbourne.

A bowling all-rounder, O'Neill plays for Melbourne in Victorian Premier Cricket. In 2019 he took a hat-trick against Monash, finishing with career-best figures of 6/25. In the 2021–22 season he received the Paul Sheahan Club Champion Award for his all-round performance, averaging 19.31 with the ball and 42.33 with the bat that year.

O'Neill's performances in Premier cricket earned him a List A debut for Victoria later that season, as well as a first-class appearance for Victoria the following season in which he took four wickets on debut, including the wickets of Australian Test players Alex Carey, and Travis Head (twice). In Victoria's victory over South Australia in the 2023–24 Sheffield Shield, he took five wickets in each innings.

O'Neill was named 2024–25 Sheffield Shield player of the season after taking 38 wickets at an average of 21.07.

He signed for Nottinghamshire County Cricket Club to play in the opening four rounds of the 2025 County Championship. O'Neill took 5/81 in the first innings of his debut match against Durham. In his third outing for Nottinghamshire, he claimed new First Class career-best figures of 5/19 in the first innings against Warwickshire. At the end of his stint, he was the leading wicket taker in the Championship with 21 wickets at an average of 17.9.

In November 2025, O'Neill agreed a contract with Nottinghamshire which will see him play County Championship matches for the club from April to June in both 2026 and 2027.

With O'Neill's contracts with Victoria and the Melbourne Renegades expiring at the end of the 2025-26 season, it was widely reported that he had received and was considering offers from New South Wales and the Sydney Sixers. O'Neill accepted the move to the Sixers for the Big Bash, signing a two-year deal, however chose to remain with Victoria on a three-year contract.

In June 2026, O'Neill ended his second spell with Nottinghamshire having taken 26 wickets in five County Championship matches.
