= Jake Doran =

Australian cricketer

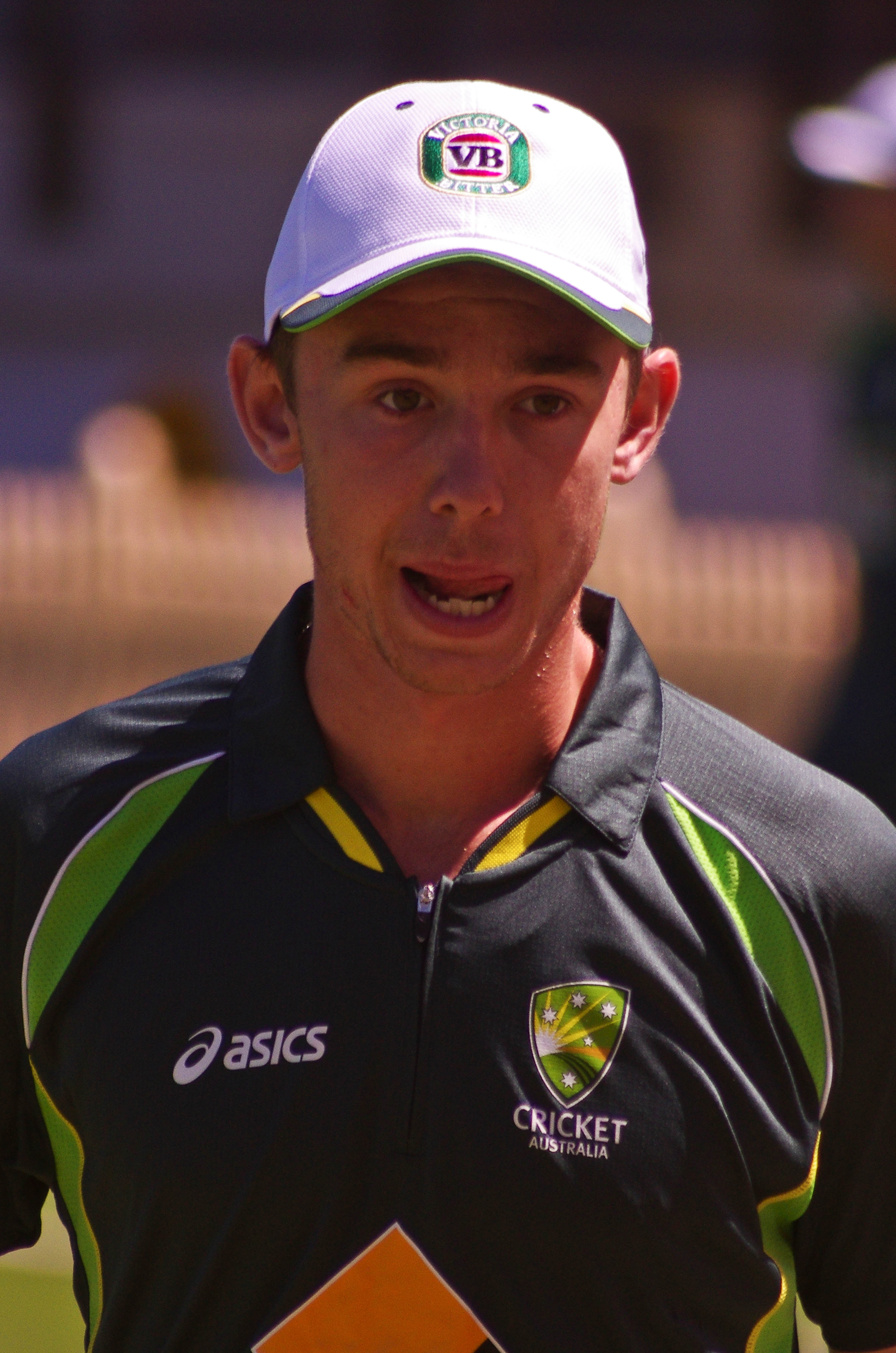
- Doran in 2014

Personal information
- Full name: Jake Richard Doran
- Born: 2 December 1996 (age 29); Blacktown, New South Wales, Australia
- Height: 173 cm (5 ft 8 in)
- Batting: Left-handed
- Bowling: Left-arm medium
- Role: Wicket-keeper batsman
- Relatives: Luke Doran (brother)

Domestic team information
- Years: Team
- 2014/15–2016/17: Sydney Thunder (squad no. 23)
- 2015/16–present: Tasmania (squad no. 2)
- 2018/19–2019/20: Hobart Hurricanes (squad no. 2)

Career statistics
Competition	FC	LA	T20
Matches	93	36	15
Runs scored	4,982	636	111
Batting average	31.13	27.65	12.33
100s/50s	5/28	2/0	0/0
Top score	123	105*	28
Balls bowled	174	–	–
Wickets	2	–	–
Bowling average	65.00	–	–
5 wickets in innings	0	–	–
10 wickets in match	0	–	–
Best bowling	1/5	–	–
Catches/stumpings	246/4	36/1	2/0
- Source: ESPNcricinfo, 25 October 2026

Jake Richard Doran (born 2 December 1996) is an Australian cricketer who plays for Tasmania. He previously represented Sydney Thunder and Hobart Hurricanes. He is the youngest player to be signed to a Big Bash League contract. Doran is the younger brother of cricketer Luke Doran and attended The Hills Sports High School.

== Domestic career ==
In 2013, Doran almost became the youngest player to score a First Grade century; playing for Fairfield-Liverpool against Sydney University, he was on 87* when his team declared. Aged 16, Doran became the youngest player ever to play for New South Wales second XI. For the 2014/15 season, New South Wales signed Doran on a rookie contract, and in October 2014, Doran signed for Big Bash team Sydney Thunder, making him the youngest player to sign a Big Bash contract. Doran signed a one-year contract with the Thunder, a week before finishing his HSC exams. Three other teams, including the Melbourne Stars were believed to have been interested in signing Doran; the Stars would have offered him a senior deal. In January 2015, Doran made his BBL debut for Thunder in a Sydney Derby match against Sydney Sixers; Doran did not bat in the match.

In March 2015, Doran signed for Tasmania from New South Wales on a two-year contract. He made his first-class debut in a Sheffield Shield match against Western Australia, making scores of 5 and 17. In his first five Sheffield Shield matches, he averaged 19.70, with 2 half-centuries. In September 2015, Doran was added to the Tasmania squad for the Matador Cup, and he made his List A debut a month later against Queensland, but did not bat in the match.

In November 2017, he scored his maiden first-class century, batting for Tasmania against South Australia in the 2017–18 Sheffield Shield season. In March 2018, Cricket Australia named Doran in their Sheffield Shield team of the year.

== International career ==
In November 2013, Doran played for Cricket Australia Chairman's XI against an England XI; the match was a tour match prior to the 2013-14 Ashes series, and Doran scored 17 in his only innings. He has also played for Prime Minister's XI against English and Indian teams. He has represented Australia under-19s, and averaged 83 at the 2014 Under-19 Cricket World Cup. Doran captained the under-19 team in series against England under-19 in 2014/15 and 2015, and scored 103 in the 2015 U-19 Test match between the teams at Chester-le-Street. Former Australian cricketer Stuart MacGill suggested that Doran should have been picked for the fifth and final Test of the 2015 Ashes series.
