= 2017–18 Sheffield Shield season =

Cricket tournament

2017–18 Sheffield Shield
- Dates: 26 October 2017 – 27 March 2018
- Administrator: Cricket Australia
- Cricket format: First-class
- Tournament format(s): Double round-robin and final
- Champions: Queensland (8th title)
- Participants: 6
- Matches: 31
- Player of the series: (Victoria (state)) Chris Tremain (Victoria)
- Most runs: Matt Renshaw (Queensland) (804)
- Most wickets: (Victoria (state)) Chris Tremain (Victoria) (51)

The 2017–18 Sheffield Shield season was the 116th season of the Sheffield Shield, the Australian domestic first-class cricket competition. It started on 26 October 2017 and finished on 27 March 2018. The opening round of matches were played as day/night fixtures and the first three rounds of matches took place before the Ashes series. Victoria were the defending champions.

In round two of the competition, Mitchell Starc became the first bowler to take a hat-trick in each innings of a first-class cricket match in Australia. He became the second Australian, and the eighth bowler overall, to do so in a first-class match.

In the final round of fixtures, Tasmania beat the defending champions, Victoria, by 156 runs to advance to their first Sheffield Shield final since the 2012–13 season. They faced Queensland at Allan Border Field in Brisbane. In the final, Queensland beat Tasmania by nine wickets to win their eighth title and their first since 2012. This was also the final season for Doug Bollinger, Ed Cowan, Ben Cutting and Michael Klinger.

== Points table ==
Team	Pld	W	L	D	NR	BP	Pts
Queensland	10	6	1	3	0	16.00	55.00
Tasmania	10	5	3	2	0	15.55	47.55
Victoria	10	3	2	5	0	16.91	39.91
Western Australia	10	3	5	2	0	17.09	37.09
New South Wales	10	3	5	2	0	14.37	34.37
South Australia	10	2	6	2	0	15.04	29.04

== Round-Robin stage ==
=== Round 1 ===
26–29 October 2017 (D/N)
Scorecard

(H) Queensland	v	Victoria
166 (59.4 overs); Usman Khawaja 40 (70); Chris Tremain 4/36 (14.4 overs)		148 (38.3 overs); Aaron Finch 41 (52); Brendan Doggett 4/33 (9 overs)
311 (93.2 overs); Usman Khawaja 122 (195); Scott Boland 3/57 (21 overs)		219 (71.3 overs); Chris Tremain 47 (46); Jack Wildermuth 4/41 (15 overs)

Queensland won by 110 runs
The Gabba, Brisbane
Umpires: Geoff Joshua and Simon Lightbody
Player of the match: Usman Khawaja (Queensland)

- Queensland won the toss and elected to bat.
- Brendan Doggett (Queensland) made his first-class debut.

26–29 October 2017 (D/N)
Scorecard

(H) Western Australia	v	Tasmania
323 (97.3 overs); Shaun Marsh 63 (138); Jackson Bird 4/61 (28.3 overs)		231 (72 overs); Jake Doran 54 (159); Matthew Kelly 4/58 (17 overs)
9/272d (69.2 overs); Nathan Coulter-Nile 52 (79); Sam Rainbird 3/47 (18 overs)		63 (23.1 overs); Beau Webster 33* (49); Nathan Coulter-Nile 3/18 (6 overs)

Western Australia won by 301 runs
WACA, Perth
Umpires: Gerard Abood and Paul Wilson
Player of the match: Nathan Coulter-Nile (Western Australia)

- Tasmania won the toss and elected to field.
- Matthew Kelly (Western Australia) made his first-class debut.
- Tasmania's second innings total of 63 was their lowest in the Sheffield Shield.

27–30 October 2017 (D/N)
Scorecard

(H) South Australia	v	New South Wales
92 (33.3 overs); Jake Weatherald 30 (51); Trent Copeland 6/24 (13.3 overs)		242 (87.5 overs); David Warner 83 (139); Chadd Sayers 4/82 (27 overs)
206 (76.4 overs); Jake Weatherald 71 (178); Mitchell Starc 8/73 (24.4 overs)		4/57 (21.5 overs); David Warner 32 (73); Daniel Worrall 2/19 (7 overs)

New South Wales won by 6 wickets
Adelaide Oval, Adelaide
Umpires: Sam Nogajski and John Ward
Player of the match: Mitchell Starc (New South Wales)

- South Australia won the toss and elected to bat.
- Mitchell Starc (New South Wales) picked up his best first-class bowling figures with 8/73.

=== Round 2 ===
4–7 November 2017
Scorecard

South Australia	v	Victoria (H)
322 (105.2 overs); Jake Lehmann 103 (115); Scott Boland 4/71 (24 overs)		345 (91.5 overs); Marcus Harris 103 (139); Chadd Sayers 3/62 (21 overs)
8/370d (96 overs); Callum Ferguson 182* (213); Chris Tremain 3/60 (17 overs)		8/273 (84 overs); Glenn Maxwell 64 (82); Joe Mennie 4/39 (18 overs)

Match drawn
Melbourne Cricket Ground, Melbourne
Umpires: Phillip Gillespie and Tony Wilds
Player of the match: Jake Lehmann (South Australia)

- South Australia won the toss and elected to bat.

4–7 November 2017
Scorecard

(H) New South Wales	v	Western Australia
270 (89.2 overs); Steve Smith 76 (130); Jhye Richardson 4/47 (21.2 overs)		176 (67 overs); Cameron Bancroft 76* (187); Mitchell Starc 4/56 (20 overs)
6/300d (70 overs); Steve Smith 127 (167); Simon Mackin 2/75 (17 overs)		223 (77.1 overs); Shaun Marsh 91 (130); Mitchell Starc 3/41 (15.1 overs)

New South Wales won by 171 runs
Hurstville Oval, Hurstville
Umpires: Shawn Craig and Bruce Oxenford
Player of the match: Mitchell Starc (New South Wales)

- Western Australia won the toss and elected to field.
- Play on Day 1 was suspended early due to bad light.
- Mitchell Starc (New South Wales) took a hat-trick in Western Australia's first innings dismissing Jason Behrendorff, David Moody and Simon Mackin in consecutive deliveries.
- Mitchell Starc also took a hat-trick in Western Australia's second innings, dismissing Jason Behrendorff, David Moody and Jonathan Wells in consecutive deliveries. He became the first bowler to take two hat-tricks in the same match in the Sheffield Shield and the eighth to achieve this feat in first-class cricket.

4–7 November 2017
Scorecard

(H) Tasmania	v	Queensland
186 (64.5 overs); Ben McDermott 37 (114); Michael Neser 6/57 (17.5 overs)		181 (55.1 overs); Jack Wildermuth 35 (57); Jackson Bird 3/40 (17 overs)
150 (64.3 overs); Alex Doolan 58 (112); Luke Feldman 5/31 (15.3 overs)		3/158 (56.2 overs); Joe Burns 70 (120); Gabe Bell 2/31 (13 overs)

Queensland won by 7 wickets
Blundstone Arena, Hobart
Umpires: Michael Graham-Smith and John Ward
Player of the match: Michael Neser (Queensland)

- Tasmania won the toss and elected to bat.
- Tom Rogers (Tasmania) made his first-class debut.

=== Round 3 ===
13–16 November 2017
Scorecard

Tasmania	v	Victoria (H)
172 (63.1 overs); George Bailey 106 (178); Fawad Ahmed 4/68 (23.1 overs)		144 (46.3 overs); Marcus Harris 86 (96); Tom Rogers 4/21 (9 overs)
2/424d (135 overs); Alex Doolan 247* (380); Peter Siddle 1/41 (20 overs)		5/106 (47 overs); Glenn Maxwell 45* (115); Sam Rainbird 2/33 (14 overs)

Match drawn
Melbourne Cricket Ground, Melbourne
Umpires: Donovan Koch and Sam Nogajski
Player of the match: Alex Doolan (Tasmania)

- Tasmania won the toss and elected to bat.
- Only 23 overs were played on Day 4 due to rain
- Riley Meredith (Tasmania) made his first-class debut.
- Jake Doran (Tasmania) became the first batsman to be an on-field substitute in a Sheffield Shield match, after Jordan Silk had a concussion.

13–16 November 2017
Scorecard

(H) Queensland	v	New South Wales
183 (71.3 overs); Usman Khawaja 78* (192); Trent Copeland 3/33 (23 overs)		271 (70.2 overs); Daniel Hughes 98* (125); Michael Neser 3/58 (16.2 overs)
215 (67 overs); Marnus Labuschagne 88* (169); Sean Abbott 4/65 (19 overs)		4/130 (30.5 overs); David Warner 37 (41); Luke Feldman 3/45 (12 overs)

New South Wales won by 6 wickets
Allan Border Field, Brisbane
Umpires: Phillip Gillespie and Simon Lightbody
Player of the match: Daniel Hughes (New South Wales)

- Queensland won the toss and elected to bat.

13–16 November 2017
Scorecard

(H) Western Australia	v	South Australia
7/514d (125 overs); Cameron Bancroft 228* (351); Joe Mennie 3/130 (26 overs)		363 (82.5 overs); Jake Weatherald 152 (160); Jhye Richardson 4/90 (20.5 overs)
173 (52.5 overs); Shaun Marsh 52 (77); Joe Mennie 3/28 (12 overs)		5/325 (93.4 overs); Jake Weatherald 143 (281); Andrew Holder 3/45 (16 overs)

South Australia won by 5 wickets
WACA, Perth
Umpires: Michael Graham-Smith and Tony Wilds
Player of the match: Jake Weatherald (South Australia)

- Western Australia won the toss and elected to bat.
- Andrew Holder (Western Australia) made his first-class debut.
- Cameron Bancroft (Western Australia) and Jake Weatherald (South Australia) both made their highest scores in first-class cricket.
- Western Australia made the highest total in the first innings in a losing cause in a Sheffield Shield match since the 2009–10 season.

=== Round 4 ===
23–26 November 2017
Scorecard

Tasmania	v	South Australia (H)
282 (111.1 overs); Jake Doran 114 (293); Adam Zampa 5/59 (29.1 overs)		141 (36.4 overs); Travis Head 80 (91); Jackson Bird 5/30 (12 overs)
244 (91.3 overs); George Bailey 86 (138); Kane Richardson 4/30 (13.3 overs)		243 (74.3 overs); Callum Ferguson 94 (192); Jackson Bird 3/51 (21 overs)

Tasmania won by 142 runs
Adelaide Oval, Adelaide
Umpires: Phillip Gillespie and Michael Graham-Smith
Player of the match: Jackson Bird (Tasmania)

- Tasmania won the toss and elected to bat.
- Jake Doran (Tasmania) scored his maiden first-class century.

24–27 November 2017
Scorecard

Victoria	v	New South Wales (H)
9/562d (140.5 overs); Glenn Maxwell 278 (318); Steve O'Keefe 3/128 (35 overs)		243 (92.5 overs); Steve O'Keefe 50* (96); Jon Holland 5/67 (33 overs)
3/148d (21 overs); Marcus Harris 62* (62); Trent Copeland 2/52 (9 overs)		8/256 (119.5 overs); Kurtis Patterson 61 (135); Jon Holland 2/36 (34 overs)

Match drawn
North Sydney Oval, North Sydney
Umpires: Simon Fry and Geoff Joshua
Player of the match: Glenn Maxwell (Victoria)

- Victoria won the toss and elected to bat.
- Glenn Maxwell (Victoria) made his highest score in first-class cricket.

24–27 November 2017
Scorecard

(H) Western Australia	v	Queensland
414 (105.2 overs); Mitchell Marsh 141 (209); Jack Wildermuth 3/69 (18 overs)		424 (105.5 overs); Jack Wildermuth 95 (151); Simon Mackin 3/106 (29 overs)
8/306d (101.2 overs); Ashton Turner 101* (160); Mitchell Swepson 4/131 (37 overs)		7/290 (59 overs); Joe Burns 103 (142); Matthew Kelly 5/60 (17 overs)

Match drawn
WACA, Perth
Umpires: Greg Davidson and Tony Wilds
Player of the match: Jack Wildermuth (Queensland)

- Western Australia won the toss and elected to bat.

=== Round 5 ===
3–6 December 2017
Scorecard

Western Australia	v	Victoria (H)
243 (86.5 overs); William Bosisto 57 (161); Fawad Ahmed 3/58 (19.5 overs)		450 (153.5 overs); Seb Gotch 98 (200); Ashton Agar 4/119 (50 overs)
3/281 (107 overs); Jonathan Wells 107 (198); Daniel Christian 1/18 (10 overs)

Match drawn
Melbourne Cricket Ground, Melbourne
Umpires: Shawn Craig and Shaun Haig
Player of the match: William Bosisto (Western Australia)

- Western Australia won the toss and elected to bat.

3–6 December 2017
Scorecard

(H) Tasmania	v	New South Wales
4/392d (112 overs); Jordan Silk 104 (248); Doug Bollinger 2/82 (22 overs)		208 (89.5 overs); Ed Cowan 67 (141); Gabe Bell 3/36 (17 overs)
0/4 (0.2 overs); Jordan Silk 4* (2)		184 (78.5 overs) (f/o); Peter Nevill 70 (160); Jackson Bird 4/40 (19 overs)

Tasmania won by 10 wickets
Blundstone Arena, Hobart
Umpires: Simon Lightbody and Paul Wilson
Player of the match: Jackson Bird (Tasmania)

- New South Wales won the toss and elected to field.
- No play was possible on day 1 due to rain.

3–6 December 2017
Scorecard

South Australia	v	Queensland (H)
485 (137.4 overs); Alex Carey 139 (209); Mitchell Swepson 5/142 (36 overs)		5/389d (122 overs); Joe Burns 202* (332); Adam Zampa 2/138 (43 overs)
7/234d (63 overs); Travis Head 65 (105); Marnus Labuschagne 2/33 (6 overs)		3/125 (42 overs); Matt Renshaw 51* (133); Chadd Sayers 2/13 (9 overs)

Match drawn
Cazaly's Stadium, Cairns
Umpires: Geoff Joshua and Donovan Koch
Player of the match: Joe Burns (Queensland)

- South Australia won the toss and elected to bat.
- Alex Carey (South Australia) scored his maiden first-class century.
- Joe Burns (Queensland) scored his maiden first-class double century.

=== Round 6 ===
8–11 February 2018
Scorecard

(H) Queensland	v	Tasmania
255 (75.1 overs); Matt Renshaw 56 (91); Gabe Bell 3/43 (14.1 overs)		115 (34 overs); George Bailey 25 (42); Luke Feldman 6/32 (11 overs)
285 (91.4 overs); Jimmy Peirson 61 (128); Matthew Wade 3/13 (3.4 overs)		219 (69 overs); Jake Doran 95 (182); Michael Neser 3/47 (15 overs)

Queensland won by 206 runs
The Gabba, Brisbane
Umpires: Shawn Craig and Brad White
Player of the match: Luke Feldman (Queensland)

- Queensland won the toss and elected to field.
- Lachlan Pfeffer (Queensland) made his first-class debut.

8–11 February 2018
Scorecard

(H) South Australia	v	Victoria
379 (95 overs); Harry Nielsen 105 (182); Chris Tremain 4/86 (25 overs)		371 (115.3 overs); Cameron White 149 (218); Nicholas Winter 5/85 (27 overs)
243 (70.5 overs); Jake Weatherald 62 (101); Scott Boland 4/41 (21 overs)		4/253 (65 overs); Peter Handscomb* 114 (128); Joe Mennie 2/40 (13 overs)

Victoria won by 6 wickets
Adelaide Oval, Adelaide
Umpires: Abhijit Deshmukh and John Ward
Player of the match: Cameron White (Victoria)

- Victoria won the toss and elected to field.
- Nicholas Winter (South Australia) and Eamonn Vines (Victoria) made their first-class debuts.
- Harry Nielsen (South Australia) scored his maiden first-class century.
- Nicholas Winter (South Australia) took his maiden first-class five-wicket-haul.

8–11 February 2018
Scorecard

New South Wales	v	Western Australia (H)
204 (82.2 overs); Daniel Hughes 49 (112); Mitchell Marsh 4/50 (16 overs)		215 (70 overs); Hilton Cartwright 78 (172); Charlie Stobo 3/32 (10 overs)
179 (62.2 overs); Ed Cowan 55 (110); Simon Mackin 6/43 (17.2 overs)		6/172 (34.3 overs); Shaun Marsh 39 (51); Gurinder Sandhu 2/22 (8 overs)

Western Australia won by 4 wickets
WACA, Perth
Umpires: Simon Lightbody and Tony Wilds
Player of the match: Simon Mackin (Western Australia)

- New South Wales won the toss and elected to bat.
- Alex Bevilaqua (Western Australia) and Mickey Edwards (New South Wales) both made their first-class debuts.

=== Round 7 ===
16–19 February 2018
Scorecard

(H) Tasmania	v	Western Australia
9/431d (115.4 overs); Matthew Wade 139 (242); Liam Guthrie 3/104 (22.4 overs)		67 (27.5 overs); Ashton Turner 19 (42); Tom Rogers 4/9 (3 overs)
		277 (61.1 overs) (f/o); Josh Philippe 74 (82); Tom Rogers 3/46 (13 overs)

Tasmania won by an innings and 87 runs
Blundstone Arena, Hobart
Umpires: Greg Davidson and Abhijit Deshmukh
Player of the match: Matthew Wade (Tasmania)

- Western Australia won the toss and elected to field.
- Josh Philippe, Clint Hinchliffe and Liam Guthrie (Western Australia) all made their first-class debuts.

16–19 February 2018
Scorecard

Queensland	v	Victoria (H)
5/452d (128 overs); Matt Renshaw 170 (218); Chris Tremain 1/54 (26 overs)		9/436d (154 overs); Will Pucovski 188 (414); Mitchell Swepson 3/151 (49 overs)
4/184d (57 overs); Marnus Labuschagne 100* (161); Peter Siddle 3/21 (10 overs)

Match drawn
Melbourne Cricket Ground, Melbourne
Umpires: Phillip Gillespie and Michael Graham-Smith
Player of the match: Will Pucovski (Victoria)

- Victoria won the toss and elected to field.

16–19 February 2018
Scorecard

(H) New South Wales	v	South Australia
256 (90.4 overs); Daniel Hughes 93 (214); Nicholas Winter 5/48 (25.4 overs)		281 (74.1 overs); Tom Cooper 105* (135); Trent Copeland 4/63 (25 overs)
213 (68.4 overs); Daniel Hughes 41 (68); Nicholas Winter 5/61 (24 overs)		3/192 (49.4 overs); Jake Weatherald 56 (93); Charlie Stobo 1/39 (8 overs)

South Australia won by 7 wickets
Sydney Cricket Ground, Sydney
Umpires: Geoff Joshua and Brad White
Player of the match: Nicholas Winter (South Australia)

- New South Wales won the toss and elected to bat.
- Nicholas Winter (South Australia) took his maiden first-class ten-wicket-haul in the match.

=== Round 8 ===
24–27 February 2018
Scorecard

(H) New South Wales	v	Tasmania
8/449d (106.5 overs); Moises Henriques 131* (183); Tom Rogers 4/88 (20.5 overs)		4/489d (158.0 overs); Beau Webster 102* (259); Steve O'Keefe 1/40 (26 overs)

Match drawn
Sydney Cricket Ground, Sydney
Umpires: Sam Nogajski and John Ward
Player of the match: Beau Webster (Tasmania)

- New South Wales won the toss and elected to bat.
- Jarrod Freeman (Tasmania) made his first-class debut.

24–27 February 2018
Scorecard

Victoria	v	Western Australia (H)
392 (97.5 overs); Travis Dean 111 (195); Marcus Stoinis 3/63 (20 overs)		302 (65.5 overs); Josh Philippe 62 (79); Chris Tremain 7/82 (18 overs)
8/378d (71.3 overs); Aaron Finch 151* (122); Marcus Stoinis 4/82 (20 overs)		213 (51.3 overs); Josh Inglis 54* (39); Scott Boland 3/44 (14 overs)

Victoria won by 255 runs
WACA, Perth
Umpires: Geoff Joshua and Tony Wilds
Player of the match: Chris Tremain (Victoria)

- Victoria won the toss and elected to bat.
- Chris Tremain (Victoria) took his maiden first-class ten-wicket haul.

25–28 February 2018
Scorecard

Queensland	v	South Australia (H)
342 (100.2 overs); Matt Renshaw 112 (148); Nicholas Winter 3/79 (24 overs)		162 (51.3 overs); Adam Zampa 57 (57); Michael Neser 4/32 (15 overs)
8/285d (86.2 overs); Marnus Labuschagne 62 (144); Nicholas Winter 3/55 (18 overs)		347 (89.3 overs); Alex Carey 98 (107); Brendan Doggett 5/77 (22 overs)

Queensland won by 118 runs
Adelaide Oval, Adelaide
Umpires: Shawn Craig and Simon Lightbody
Player of the match: Matt Renshaw (Queensland)

- South Australia won the toss and elected to field.
- Brendan Doggett (Queensland) took his maiden first-class five-wicket haul.

=== Round 9 ===
3–6 March 2018
Scorecard

(H) Victoria	v	New South Wales
199 (75.4 overs); Marcus Harris 102 (161); Steve O'Keefe 8/77 (32.4 overs)		171 (55.1 overs); Kurtis Patterson 43 (73); Fawad Ahmed 3/32 (13.1 overs)
280 (103.1 overs); Travis Dean 106 (270); Trent Copeland 5/59 (24.1 overs)		285 (101.5 overs); Daniel Hughes 59* (146); Fawad Ahmed 5/94 (24.5 overs)

Victoria won by 23 runs
Junction Oval, St Kilda
Umpires: Gerard Abood and Simon Lightbody
Player of the match: Steve O'Keefe (New South Wales)

- Victoria won the toss and elected to bat.
- Param Uppal (New South Wales) made his first-class debut.
- Will Pucovski was substituted out of the match following a hit to the head by a bouncer off the bowling of Sean Abbott. He was replaced in the match by Daniel Christian.

5–8 March 2018
Scorecard

(H) Tasmania	v	South Australia
393 (125.5 overs); Jake Doran 74 (204); Nicholas Winter 5/81 (31.5 overs)		227 (68.3 overs); Callum Ferguson 51 (119); Tom Rogers 4/58 (14.3 overs)
164 (50.2 overs); Jordan Silk 53 (80); Daniel Worrall 4/17 (12.2 overs)		314 (87.1 overs); Travis Head 145 (167); Jackson Bird 4/64 (24.1 overs)

Tasmania won by 16 runs
Blundstone Arena, Hobart
Umpires: Tony Wilds and Michael Graham-Smith
Player of the match: Travis Head (South Australia)

- Tasmania won the toss and elected to bat.
- Conor McInerney (South Australia) made his first-class debut.

6–9 March 2018
Scorecard

(H) Queensland	v	Western Australia
263 (84.4 overs); Charlie Hemphrey 103* (219); Simon Mackin 3/61 (16 overs)		9/211d (54.4 overs); Josh Inglis 39* (50); Mitchell Swepson 3/54 (13.4 overs)
2/252d (64 overs); Matt Renshaw 143* (196); Marcus Stoinis 1/26 (9 overs)		93 (38.2 overs); Ashton Turner 19 (43); Jack Wildermuth 4/25 (12 overs)

Queensland won by 211 runs
The Gabba, Brisbane
Umpires: Phillip Gillespie and John Ward
Player of the match: Charlie Hemphrey (Queensland)

- Western Australia won the toss and elected to field.
- Luke Feldman (Queensland) took his 200th wicket in first-class cricket.

=== Round 10 ===
14–17 March 2018
Scorecard

(H) Tasmania	v	Victoria
344 (104.5 overs); Jake Doran 57 (102); Chris Tremain 6/81 (27 overs)		182 (44.4 overs); Daniel Christian 69 (87); Andrew Fekete 6/67 (12 overs)
215 (64.3 overs); Tom Rogers 80 (104); Peter Siddle 3/76 (20 overs)		221 (49.4 overs); Travis Dean 46 (72); Andrew Fekete 4/43 (11 overs)

Tasmania won by 156 runs
Blundstone Arena, Hobart
Umpires: Geoff Joshua and John Ward
Player of the match: Andrew Fekete (Tasmania)

- Victoria won the toss and elected to field.

14–17 March 2018
Scorecard

Queensland	v	New South Wales (H)
243 (76.3 overs); Joe Burns 97 (171); Trent Copeland 5/74 (29 overs)		402 (117.2 overs); Nic Maddinson 87 (63); Michael Neser 3/45 (25 overs)
9/438d (119 overs); Marnus Labuschagne 134 (218); Trent Copeland 4/94 (39.3 overs)		243 (46.5 overs); Peter Nevill 53 (55); Michael Neser 3/43 (9 overs)

Queensland won by 36 runs
North Dalton Park, Wollongong
Umpires: Phillip Gillespie and Sam Nogajski
Player of the match: Marnus Labuschagne (Queensland)

- New South Wales won the toss and elected to field.

14–17 March 2018
Scorecard

Western Australia	v	South Australia (H)
355 (88.4 overs); Josh Inglis 83 (117); Daniel Worrall 5/72 (22.4 overs)		201 (53.5 overs); Conor McInerney 51 (90); Liam Guthrie 4/59 (18 overs)
7/370d (119 overs); Hilton Cartwright 111* (181); Nicholas Winter 4/90 (21 overs)		283 (101 overs); Callum Ferguson 92 (228); Ashton Agar 3/41 (25 overs)

Western Australia won by 241 runs
Gliderol Stadium, Glenelg
Umpires: Gerard Abood and Greg Davidson
Player of the match: Hilton Cartwright (Western Australia)

- South Australia won the toss and elected to field.

== Final ==
23–27 March 2018
Scorecard

Tasmania	v	Queensland (H)
477 (138.2 overs); Matthew Wade 108 (190); Brendan Doggett 5/101 (31 overs)		516 (148.3 overs); Charlie Hemphrey 77 (194); Beau Webster 3/83 (25.3 overs)
1/166d (26 overs); Alex Doolan 82* (74); Jack Wildermuth 1/54 (6 overs)		1/128 (22.5 overs); Matt Renshaw 81* (83); Beau Webster 1/7 (2 overs)

Queensland won by 9 wickets
Allan Border Field, Brisbane
Umpires: Gerard Abood and Sam Nogajski
Player of the match: Matthew Wade (Tasmania)

- Tasmania won the toss and elected to bat.
- Day 1 of the match was abandoned due to an unsafe outfield.

== Squads ==
=== New South Wales ===
New South Wales named the following squad for 2017–18. Players with international caps are listed in bold.

No.	Name	Nat	Birth date	Batting style	Bowling style	Notes
Batsmen
3	Daniel Hughes	(Australia)	16 February 1989 (age 37)	Left-handed	Right-arm medium	
17	Kurtis Patterson	(Australia)	5 May 1993 (age 33)	Left-handed	Right-arm off break	
18	Param Uppal	(Australia)	25 October 1998 (age 28)	Right-handed	Right-arm off-break	Rookie contract
19	**Steve Smith**	(Australia)	2 June 1989 (age 37)	Right-handed	Right-arm leg break	Cricket Australia contract, captain
22	Ryan Gibson	(Australia)	30 December 1993 (age 32)	Right-handed	Right-arm medium	
27	**Ed Cowan**	(Australia)	16 June 1982 (age 44)	Left-handed	Right-arm leg break	
31	**David Warner**	(Australia)	27 October 1986 (age 40)	Left-handed	Right-arm leg break	Cricket Australia contract
36	Nick Larkin	(Australia)	1 May 1990 (age 36)	Right-handed	—	
53	**Nic Maddinson**	(Australia)	21 December 1991 (age 34)	Left-handed	Slow left-arm orthodox	
–	Jordan Gauci	(Australia)	27 July 1998 (age 28)	Right-handed	—	Rookie contract
–	Jason Sangha	(Australia)	8 September 1999 (age 27)	Right-handed	Left-arm leg break	Rookie contract
All-rounders
14	Ben Dwarshuis	(Australia)	23 June 1994 (age 32)	Left-handed	Left-arm fast-medium	
21	**Moises Henriques**	(Australia)	1 February 1987 (age 39)	Right-handed	Right-arm medium-fast	Vice-captain
Wicket-keepers
20	**Peter Nevill**	(Australia)	13 October 1985 (age 41)	Right-handed	—	Cricket Australia contract
70	Jay Lenton	(Australia)	10 August 1990 (age 36)	Left-handed	—	
Bowlers
5	Harry Conway	(Australia)	17 September 1992 (age 34)	Right-handed	Right-arm fast-medium	
8	**Josh Hazlewood**	(Australia)	8 January 1991 (age 35)	Left-handed	Right-arm fast-medium	Cricket Australia contract
9	**Trent Copeland**	(Australia)	14 March 1986 (age 40)	Right-handed	Right-arm fast-medium	
12	Arjun Nair	(Australia)	12 April 1998 (age 28)	Right-handed	Right-arm off break	
24	William Somerville	(New Zealand)	9 August 1984 (age 42)	Right-handed	Right-arm off break	
25	Charlie Stobo	(Australia)	8 March 1995 (age 31)	Right-handed	Right-arm fast-medium	
28	**Gurinder Sandhu**	(Australia)	14 June 1993 (age 33)	Left-handed	Right-arm fast-medium	
30	**Pat Cummins**	(Australia)	8 May 1993 (age 33)	Right-handed	Right-arm fast	Cricket Australia contract
42	Daniel Fallins	(Australia)	12 August 1996 (age 30)	Right-handed	Right-arm leg-break	Rookie contract
56	**Mitchell Starc**	(Australia)	30 January 1990 (age 36)	Left-handed	Left-arm fast	Cricket Australia contract
67	**Nathan Lyon**	(Australia)	20 November 1987 (age 38)	Right-handed	Right-arm off break	Cricket Australia contract
72	**Steve O'Keefe**	(Australia)	9 December 1984 (age 41)	Right-handed	Slow left-arm orthodox	
77	**Sean Abbott**	(Australia)	29 February 1992 (age 34)	Right-handed	Right-arm fast-medium	
78	Mickey Edwards	(Australia)	23 December 1994 (age 31)	Right-handed	Right-arm fast-medium	Rookie contract
–	Liam Hatcher	(Australia)	17 September 1996 (age 30)	Right-handed	Right-arm fast-medium	Rookie contract
–	Henry Thornton	(Australia)	16 December 1996 (age 29)	Right-handed	Right-arm fast-medium	

=== Queensland ===
Queensland named the following squad for 2017–18. Players with international caps are listed in bold.

No.	Name	Nat	Birth date	Batting style	Bowling style	Notes
Batsmen
4	**Usman Khawaja**	(Australia)	18 December 1986 (age 39)	Left-handed	Right-arm medium	Cricket Australia contract, Captain
9	**Marnus Labuschagne**	(Australia)	22 June 1994 (age 32)	Right-handed	Right-arm leg break	Cricket Australia contract
15	**Joe Burns**	(Australia)	6 September 1989 (age 37)	Right-handed	Right-arm medium	Cricket Australia contract
25	Sam Truloff	(Australia)	24 March 1993 (age 33)	Right-handed	Right-arm leg break	
44	Charlie Hemphrey	(England)	31 August 1989 (age 37)	Right-handed	Right-arm off break	
47	**Sam Heazlett**	(Australia)	12 September 1995 (age 31)	Left-handed	Left-arm off break	
50	**Chris Lynn**	(Australia)	4 October 1990 (age 36)	Right-handed	Slow left-arm orthodox	
66	**Peter Forrest**	(Australia)	15 November 1985 (age 41)	Right-handed	Right-arm medium	
94	**Matt Renshaw**	(Australia)	28 March 1996 (age 30)	Left-handed	Right-arm off break	Cricket Australia contract
–	Bryce Street	(Australia)	–	Left-handed	Right-arm medium	Rookie contract
All-rounders
20	Michael Neser	(Australia)	29 March 1990 (age 36)	Right-handed	Right-arm medium-fast	
24	Jack Wildermuth	(Australia)	1 September 1993 (age 33)	Right-handed	Right-arm medium-fast	
31	**Ben Cutting**	(Australia)	30 January 1987 (age 39)	Right-handed	Right-arm fast-medium	
52	Jason Floros	(Australia)	24 November 1990 (age 35)	Left-handed	Right-arm off break	
–	James Bazley	(Australia)	8 April 1995 (age 31)	Right-handed	Right-arm medium	
–	Max Bryant	(Australia)	3 October 1999 (age 27)	Right-handed	Right-arm medium	Rookie contract
–	Harry Wood	(Australia)	–	Right-handed	Right-arm fast-medium	Rookie contract
Wicket-keepers
33	Lachlan Pfeffer	(Australia)	8 April 1991 (age 35)	Left-handed	—	
59	Jimmy Peirson	(Australia)	13 October 1992 (age 34)	Right-handed	—	
Bowlers
14	**Peter George**	(Australia)	16 October 1986 (age 40)	Right-handed	Right-arm fast-medium	
16	Mark Steketee	(Australia)	17 January 1994 (age 32)	Right-handed	Right-arm fast-medium	
21	Cameron Gannon	(Australia)	23 January 1989 (age 37)	Right-handed	Right-arm fast-medium	
22	Mitchell Swepson	(Australia)	4 October 1993 (age 33)	Right-handed	Right-arm leg break	
35	Brendan Doggett	(Australia)	3 April 1994 (age 32)	Right-handed	Right-arm fast-medium	
58	Luke Feldman	(Australia)	1 August 1984 (age 42)	Right-handed	Right-arm fast-medium	
64	**Billy Stanlake**	(Australia)	4 November 1994 (age 32)	Right-handed	Right-arm fast-medium	Cricket Australia contract
–	Xavier Bartlett	(Australia)	17 December 1998 (age 27)	Right-handed	Right-arm fast-medium	Rookie contract
–	Matthew Kuhnemann	(Australia)	20 September 1996 (age 30)	Left-handed	Slow left-arm orthodox	Rookie contract
–	Jack Prestwidge	(Australia)	–	Right-handed	Right-arm fast-medium	Rookie contract

=== South Australia ===
South Australia named the following squad for 2017–18. Players with international caps are listed in bold.

No.	Name	Nat	Birth date	Batting style	Bowling style	Notes
Batsmen
7	Johnathan Dalton	(Australia)	9 June 1996 (age 30)	Right-handed	Right-arm medium	
12	**Callum Ferguson**	(Australia)	21 November 1984 (age 41)	Right-handed	Right-arm medium	
20	Kelvin Smith	(Australia)	5 September 1994 (age 32)	Left-handed	Right-arm off break	
26	**Tom Cooper**	(Netherlands)	26 November 1986 (age 39)	Right-handed	Right-arm off break	
28	Jake Weatherald	(Australia)	4 November 1994 (age 32)	Left-Handed	Right arm leg break	
33	Jake Lehmann	(Australia)	8 July 1992 (age 34)	Left-handed	Slow left-arm orthodox	
34	**Travis Head**	(Australia)	29 December 1993 (age 32)	Left-handed	Right-arm off break	Captain Cricket Australia contract
39	Conor McInerney	(Australia)	30 March 1994 (age 32)	Left-handed	Slow left-arm orthodox	
49	Alex Ross	(Australia)	17 April 1992 (age 34)	Right-handed	Right-arm off break	
–	Patrick Page	(Australia)	15 January 1998 (age 28)	Left-handed	Right-arm medium	
–	Jake Winter	(Australia)	2 June 1997 (age 29)	Right-handed	Right-arm medium	Rookie contract
All-rounders
3	Cameron Valente	(Australia)	6 September 1994 (age 32)	Right-handed	Right-arm medium-fast	
–	Daniel Drew	(Australia)	–	Right-handed	Right-arm off break	Rookie contract
–	Ben Pengelley	(Australia)	16 February 1998 (age 28)	Left-handed	Left-arm medium-fast	Rookie contract
Wicket-keepers
4	Harry Nielsen	(Australia)	3 May 1995 (age 31)	Left-handed	Right-arm off break	
5	**Alex Carey**	(Australia)	27 August 1991 (age 35)	Left-handed	—	
Bowlers
1	**Daniel Worrall**	(Australia)	10 July 1991 (age 35)	Right-handed	Right-arm fast-medium	
15	**Joe Mennie**	(Australia)	24 December 1988 (age 37)	Right-handed	Right-arm fast-medium	
17	Michael Cormack	(Australia)	29 June 1997 (age 29)	Right-handed	Right-arm off break	Rookie contract
21	Spencer Johnson	(Australia)	16 December 1995 (age 30)	Left-handed	Left-arm fast-medium	Rookie contract
27	Chadd Sayers	(Australia)	31 August 1987 (age 39)	Right-handed	Right-arm medium-fast	
29	Tom Andrews	(Australia)	7 October 1994 (age 32)	Left-handed	Slow left-arm orthodox	
30	Nick Benton	(Australia)	29 June 1991 (age 35)	Right-handed	Right-arm medium-fast	
44	Nick Winter	(Australia)	19 June 1993 (age 33)	Left-handed	Left-arm fast-medium	
55	**Kane Richardson**	(Australia)	12 February 1991 (age 35)	Right-handed	Right-arm fast	
63	**Adam Zampa**	(Australia)	31 March 1992 (age 34)	Right-handed	Right-arm leg break	Cricket Australia contract
–	David Grant	(Australia)	24 April 1997 (age 29)	Right-handed	Right-arm medium-fast	
–	Lloyd Pope	(Australia)	1 December 1999 (age 26)	Right-handed	Right-arm leg break	Rookie contract

=== Tasmania ===
Tasmania named the following squad for 2017–18. Players with international caps are listed in bold.

No.	Name	Nat	Birth date	Batting style	Bowling style	Notes
Batsmen
2	Jake Doran	(Australia)	2 December 1996 (age 29)	Left-handed	Left-arm medium	
9	Charlie Wakim	(Australia)	9 July 1991 (age 35)	Right-handed	Right-arm medium	
10	**George Bailey**	(Australia)	7 September 1982 (age 44)	Right-handed	Right-arm medium	Cricket Australia contract, captain
21	Jordan Silk	(Australia)	13 April 1992 (age 34)	Right-handed	Right-arm fast-medium	
28	Ben McDermott	(Australia)	12 December 1994 (age 31)	Right-handed	Right-arm medium	
64	**Alex Doolan**	(Australia)	29 November 1985 (age 40)	Right-handed	Right arm medium	Vice-captain
–	Jake Hancock	(Australia)	28 November 1991 (age 34)	Right-handed	Right-arm off-break	
–	Caleb Jewell	(Australia)	21 April 1997 (age 29)	Left-handed	Left-arm medium	Rookie contract
–	Corey Murfet	(Australia)	21 January 1997 (age 29)	Left-handed	Right-arm medium	Rookie contract
All-rounders
15	Simon Milenko	(Australia)	24 November 1988 (age 37)	Right-handed	Right-arm medium	
19	Jarrod Freeman	(Australia)	15 June 2000 (age 26)	Right-handed	Right-arm off-break	Not contracted
20	Beau Webster	(Australia)	1 December 1993 (age 32)	Right-handed	Right-arm off-break	
25	**James Faulkner**	(Australia)	29 April 1990 (age 36)	Right-handed	Left-arm medium-fast	Cricket Australia contract
–	Liam Devlin	(Australia)	—	Right-handed	Right-arm leg break	Rookie contract
–	Mac Wright	(Australia)	27 January 1998 (age 28)	Right-handed	Right-arm leg break	Rookie contract
Wicket-keepers
31	**Matthew Wade**	(Australia)	26 December 1987 (age 38)	Left-handed	Right-arm medium	Cricket Australia Contract
36	**Tim Paine**	(Australia)	8 December 1984 (age 41)	Right-handed	—	
51	**Ben Dunk**	(Australia)	3 November 1987 (age 39)	Left-handed	Right-arm off-break	
Bowlers
3	Cameron Stevenson	(Australia)	30 October 1992 (age 34)	Right-handed	Right-arm fast-medium	
5	Gabe Bell	(Australia)	3 July 1995 (age 31)	Right-handed	Right-arm medium-fast	
6	Tom Rogers	(Australia)	3 March 1994 (age 32)	Left-handed	Right-arm fast-medium	
12	Riley Meredith	(Australia)	21 June 1996 (age 30)	Left-handed	Right-arm fast-medium	Rookie contract
13	**Cameron Boyce**	(Australia)	27 July 1989 (age 37)	Right-handed	Right-arm leg break	
16	Nick Buchanan	(Australia)	3 April 1991 (age 35)	Right-handed	Right-arm fast-medium	
17	Andrew Fekete	(Australia)	18 May 1985 (age 41)	Right-handed	Right-arm fast	
22	**Jackson Bird**	(Australia)	11 December 1986 (age 39)	Right-handed	Right-arm fast-medium	
43	Sam Rainbird	(Australia)	5 June 1992 (age 34)	Right-handed	Right-arm medium-fast	
–	Andrew Perrin	(Australia)	23 June 1990 (age 36)	Right-handed	Right-arm fast-medium	
–	Hamish Kingston	(Australia)	17 December 1990 (age 35)	Right-handed	Right-arm medium-fast	Not contracted
–	Aaron Summers	(Australia)	24 March 1996 (age 30)	Right-handed	Right-arm fast	Rookie contract

=== Victoria ===
Victoria named the following squad for 2017–18. Players with international caps are listed in bold.

No.	Name	Nat	Birth date	Batting style	Bowling style	Notes
Batsmen
5	**Aaron Finch**	(Australia)	17 November 1986 (age 39)	Right-handed	Left-arm off break	Vice Captain, Cricket Australia contract
8	Blake Thomson	(Australia)	9 December 1997 (age 28)	Right-handed	Right-arm off break	
9	**Cameron White**	(Australia)	18 August 1983 (age 43)	Right-handed	Right-arm leg break	
10	Will Pucovski	(Australia)	2 February 1998 (age 28)	Right-handed	Right-arm off break	
14	Marcus Harris	(Australia)	21 July 1992 (age 34)	Left-handed	Right-arm off break	
22	Eamonn Vines	(Australia)	17 January 1994 (age 32)	Left-handed	—	
29	Travis Dean	(Australia)	1 February 1992 (age 34)	Right-handed	Right-arm Medium	
36	Seb Gotch	(Australia)	12 July 1993 (age 33)	Right-handed	—	Occasional wicket-keeper
All-rounders
2	Matthew Short	(Australia)	8 November 1995 (age 31)	Right-handed	Right-arm off break	
12	Will Sutherland	(Australia)	27 October 1999 (age 27)	Right-handed	Right-arm fast-medium	Rookie contract
32	**Glenn Maxwell**	(Australia)	14 October 1988 (age 38)	Right-handed	Right-arm off break	Cricket Australia contract
45	**Daniel Christian**	(Australia)	4 May 1983 (age 43)	Right-handed	Right-arm fast-medium	
–	Guy Walker	(Australia)	12 September 1995 (age 31)	Right-handed	Right-arm medium-fast	
Wicket-keepers
7	Sam Harper	(Australia)	10 December 1996 (age 29)	Right-handed	Right-arm medium	
54	**Peter Handscomb**	(Australia)	26 April 1991 (age 35)	Right-handed	—	Captain, Cricket Australia contract
Bowlers
3	Jackson Coleman	(Australia)	18 December 1991 (age 34)	Right-handed	Left-arm medium-fast	
17	**James Muirhead**	(Australia)	30 July 1993 (age 33)	Right-handed	Right-arm leg break	
18	**Jon Holland**	(Australia)	29 May 1987 (age 39)	Right-handed	Slow left-arm orthodox	
19	**James Pattinson**	(Australia)	3 May 1990 (age 36)	Left-handed	Right-arm fast	Cricket Australia contract
20	**Peter Siddle**	(Australia)	25 November 1984 (age 41)	Right-handed	Right-arm fast	
24	**Scott Boland**	(Australia)	11 March 1989 (age 37)	Right-handed	Right-arm fast medium	
26	Xavier Crone	(Australia)	19 December 1997 (age 28)	Right-handed	Right-arm medium-fast	
34	Jake Reed	(Australia)	28 September 1990 (age 36)	Left-handed	Right-arm fast	
80	**Fawad Ahmed**	(Australia)	5 February 1982 (age 44)	Right-handed	Right-arm leg break	
99	**Chris Tremain**	(Australia)	10 August 1991 (age 35)	Right-handed	Right-arm medium-fast	
–	Wes Agar	(Australia)	5 February 1997 (age 29)	Right-handed	Right-arm fast-medium	JLT Cup contract
–	Zak Evans	(Australia)	–	Right-handed	Right-arm fast	Rookie contract
–	Sam Grimwade	(Australia)	16 December 1996 (age 29)	Right-handed	Right-arm off break	Rookie contract
–	Jackson Koop	(Australia)	9 August 1995 (age 31)	Right-handed	Right-arm fast-medium	Rookie contract
–	Tom O'Donnell	(Australia)	23 October 1996 (age 30)	Right-handed	Left-arm medium-fast	Rookie contract
–	Mitch Perry	(Australia)	–	Right-handed	Right-arm fast-medium	Rookie contract

=== Western Australia ===
Western Australia named the following squad for 2017–18. Players with international caps are listed in bold.

No.	Name	Nat	Birth date	Batting style	Bowling style	Contract Type & Notes
Batsmen
4	**Cameron Bancroft**	(Australia)	19 November 1992 (age 33)	Right-handed	—	Occasional Wicket-keeper
8	Jonathan Wells	(Australia)	13 August 1988 (age 38)	Right-handed	Right-arm medium	
20	**Shaun Marsh**	(Australia)	9 July 1983 (age 43)	Left-handed	Right-arm medium	
27	Josh Philippe	(Australia)	1 June 1997 (age 29)	Left-handed	Right-arm medium	Not contracted
39	Will Bosisto	(Australia)	8 September 1993 (age 33)	Right-handed	Right-arm off break	
–	Jake Carder	(Australia)	11 December 1995 (age 30)	Left-handed	Right-arm medium	Rookie contract
All-rounders
10	**Mitchell Marsh**	(Australia)	20 October 1991 (age 35)	Right-handed	Right-arm fast-medium	Captain
16	**Marcus Stoinis**	(Australia)	16 August 1989 (age 37)	Right-handed	Right-arm medium	
17	**Ashton Turner**	(Australia)	25 January 1993 (age 33)	Right-handed	Right-arm off break	
23	**D'Arcy Short**	(Australia)	9 August 1990 (age 36)	Left-handed	Left-arm unorthodox	
24	Clint Hinchcliffe	(Australia)	23 October 1996 (age 30)	Left-handed	Slow left-arm orthodox	Rookie contract
35	**Hilton Cartwright**	(Australia)	14 February 1992 (age 34)	Right-handed	Right-arm medium	
–	**Matthew Spoors**	(Australia)	–	Right-handed	Right-arm Leg break	Rookie contract
Wicket-keepers
9	Sam Whiteman	(Australia)	19 March 1992 (age 34)	Left-handed	—	
95	Josh Inglis	(Australia)	4 May 1995 (age 31)	Right-handed	—	
Bowlers
2	**Jhye Richardson**	(Australia)	20 September 1996 (age 30)	Right-handed	Right-arm fast-medium	
3	**Joel Paris**	(Australia)	12 November 1992 (age 34)	Left-handed	Left-arm fast-medium	
5	**Jason Behrendorff**	(Australia)	20 April 1990 (age 36)	Right-handed	Left-arm fast-medium	
6	Liam Guthrie	(Australia)	9 April 1997 (age 29)	Left-handed	Left-arm fast-medium	Not contracted
12	Matt Kelly	(Australia)	7 December 1994 (age 31)	Right-handed	Right-arm medium-fast	Rookie contract
13	**Nathan Coulter-Nile**	(Australia)	11 October 1987 (age 39)	Right-handed	Right-arm fast	
15	David Moody	(Australia)	28 April 1995 (age 31)	Right-handed	Right-arm fast-medium	
18	**Ashton Agar**	(Australia)	14 October 1993 (age 33)	Left-handed	Slow left-arm orthodox	
29	Alex Bevilaqua	(Australia)	29 October 1996 (age 30)	Right-handed	Right-arm fast-medium	Rookie contract
33	Simon Mackin	(Australia)	1 September 1992 (age 34)	Right-handed	Right-arm fast-medium	
36	Andrew Holder	(Australia)	22 September 1999 (age 27)	Right-handed	Right-arm fast-medium	Not contracted
68	**Andrew Tye**	(Australia)	12 December 1986 (age 39)	Right-handed	Right-arm medium-fast	
–	Kyle Gardiner	(Australia)	20 September 1996 (age 30)	Right-handed	Right-arm leg break	Rookie contract
–	Cameron Green	(Australia)	3 June 1999 (age 27)	Right-handed	Right-arm fast-medium	

== Debutants ==
The following players made their first-class debuts throughout the competition.

Date	Name	Role	Batting	Bowling	Team	Against
26 October 2017	Brendan Doggett	Bowler	Right-handed	Right-arm fast-medium	Queensland	South Australia
26 October 2017	Matthew Kelly	Bowler	Right-handed	Right-arm fast-medium	Western Australia	Tasmania
4 November 2017	Tom Rogers	Bowler	Left-handed	Right-arm fast-medium	Tasmania	Queensland
13 November 2017	Riley Meredith	Bowler	Right-handed	Right-arm fast-medium	Tasmania	Victoria
13 November 2017	Andrew Holder	Bowler	Right-handed	Right-arm fast-medium	Western Australia	South Australia
8 February 2018	Lachlan Pfeffer	Batsman	Left-handed	Right-arm medium	Queensland	Tasmania
8 February 2018	Nicholas Winter	Bowler	Left-handed	Left-arm fast-medium	South Australia	Victoria
8 February 2018	Eamonn Vines	Batsman	Left-handed	Left-arm medium	Victoria	South Australia
8 February 2018	Alex Bevilaqua	Bowler	Right-handed	Right-arm fast-medium	Western Australia	New South Wales
8 February 2018	Mickey Edwards	Bowler	Right-handed	Right-arm fast-medium	New South Wales	Western Australia
16 February 2018	Liam Guthrie	Bowler	Left-handed	Left-arm fast-medium	Western Australia	Tasmania
16 February 2018	Clint Hinchliffe	All-rounder	Left-handed	Slow left-arm orthodox	Western Australia	Tasmania
16 February 2018	Josh Philippe	Batsman	Right-handed	Right-arm medium	Western Australia	Tasmania
24 February 2018	Jarrod Freeman	All-rounder	Right-handed	Right-arm off-break	Tasmania	New South Wales
3 March 2018	Param Uppal	Batsman	Right-handed	Right-arm off-break	New South Wales	Victoria
5 March 2018	Conor McInerney	Batsman	Left-handed	Slow left-arm orthodox	South Australia	Tasmania

== Broadcasting ==
All Sheffield Shield matches were exclusively streamed live and free on Cricket Australia's official website, with the final broadcast live on ABC Radio Grandstand radio.
