= 2016–17 Sheffield Shield season =

Cricket tournament

2016–17 Sheffield Shield
- Logo of the 2016–17 Sheffield Shield season
- Dates: 25 October 2016 – 29 March 2017
- Administrator: Cricket Australia
- Cricket format: First-class
- Tournament format(s): Double round-robin and final
- Champions: Victoria (31st title)
- Participants: 6
- Matches: 31
- Player of the series: Chadd Sayers (South Australia)
- Most runs: Ed Cowan (New South Wales) (959)
- Most wickets: Chadd Sayers (South Australia) (62)

The 2016–17 Sheffield Shield season was the 115th season of the Sheffield Shield, the Australian domestic first-class cricket competition. It started on 25 October 2016 and finished on 30 March 2017. There was a break between December and January for the Big Bash League. The first round of matches were played as day/night games in preparation for Australia's day/night Test match against Pakistan on 15 December 2016. A second day/night round of fixtures took place in round five of the tournament.

Victoria qualified for the final after their 8 wicket win against Western Australia in round 9 of the competition. Victoria secured a home tie in the final, with an innings victory against Queensland in round 10. However, the Melbourne Cricket Ground was unavailable for the fixture, so it took place at Traeger Park in Alice Springs. They faced South Australia in the final, for the second consecutive year. Victoria won the competition with a first-innings lead in the final, after the match finished as a draw. It was their 31st tournament win and their third consecutive title.

== Points table ==
Team	Pld	W	L	D	NR	BP	Pts
Victoria	10	7	2	1	0	17.31	60.31
South Australia	10	5	5	0	0	17.24	47.24
Western Australia	10	5	5	0	0	15.48	45.48
New South Wales	10	4	3	3	0	17.60	44.60
Queensland	10	4	5	1	0	16.53	41.53
Tasmania	10	1	6	3	0	10.64	19.64

== Round-Robin stage ==
Visitor team →	NSW	QLD	SA	TAS	VIC	WA
Home team ↓	NSW	QLD	SA	TAS	VIC	WA
New South Wales		Match drawn	NSW; 8 wickets	Match drawn	Victoria; 198 runs	NSW; 3 wickets
Queensland	NSW; 225 runs		Queensland; 128 runs	Queensland; 133 runs	Victoria; Inns & 11 runs	Queensland; 97 runs
South Australia	SA; 2 wickets	SA; 6 wickets		SA; Inns & 94 runs	Victoria; 124 runs	WA; 7 runs
Tasmania	Match drawn	Queensland; Inns & 172 runs	SA; 193 runs		Match drawn	WA; 9 wickets
Victoria	NSW; Inns & 77 runs	Victoria; Inns & 81 runs	Victoria; 5 wickets	Victoria; 113 runs		Victoria; 8 wickets
Western Australia	WA; 6 runs	WA; 8 wickets	SA; 10 wickets	Tasmania; 9 wickets	WA; Inns & 38 runs	

Home team won	Visitor team won

- Note: Results listed are according to the home (horizontal) and visitor (vertical) teams.
- Note: Click on a result to see a summary of the match.

=== Round 1 ===
25–28 October (D/N)
Scorecard

New South Wales	v	Queensland (H)
7/327d (78 overs); Steve Smith 117 (164); Luke Feldman 5/68 (17 overs)		6/330d (93 overs); Joe Burns 129 (232); Josh Hazlewood 4/70 (22 overs)
7/367d (93 overs); David Warner 134 (160); Michael Neser 2/63 (13 overs)		139 (47.2 overs); Joe Burns 30 (46); Doug Bollinger 4/32 (12 overs)

New South Wales won by 225 runs
Brisbane Cricket Ground, Brisbane
Umpires: Phillip Gillespie and Michael Graham-Smith
Player of the match: David Warner (New South Wales)

- New South Wales won the toss and elected to bat.
- Bonus Points: Queensland 2.00, New South Wales 1.87

25–28 October (D/N)
Scorecard

(H) Western Australia	v	South Australia
9/271d (79.4 overs); Shaun Marsh 73 (151); Joe Mennie 3/56 (19 overs)		9/505d (106 overs); Tom Cooper 138 (154); Jason Behrendorff 3/70 (20 overs)
302 (78.2 overs); Shaun Marsh 110 (165); Chadd Sayers 4/57 (17 overs)		0/69 (23.3 overs); Jake Weatherald 37* (61)

South Australia won by 10 wickets
WACA, Perth
Umpires: Gerard Abood and Ashley Barrow
Player of the match: Chadd Sayers (South Australia)

- South Australia won the toss and elected to field.
- Bonus Points: Western Australia 1.51, South Australia 3.61

25–28 October (D/N)
Scorecard

(H) Victoria	v	Tasmania
415 (117.2 overs); Marcus Harris 115 (144); Jackson Bird 3/75 (30 overs)		255 (97.3 overs); George Bailey 64 (172); Daniel Christian 4/35 (20.3 overs)
9/204d (44 overs); Marcus Harris 77 (88); Beau Webster 3/25 (6 overs)		251 (83.3 overs); James Faulkner 78 (156); Chris Tremain 3/60 (16.3 overs)

Victoria won by 113 runs
Melbourne Cricket Ground, Melbourne
Umpires: Geoff Davidson and Geoff Joshua
Player of the match: Marcus Harris (Victoria)

- Tasmania won the toss and elected to field.
- Bonus Points: Victoria 2.73, Tasmania 0.95

=== Round 2 ===
4–7 November
Scorecard

Queensland	v	Victoria (H)
137 (47.4 overs); Sam Heazlett 51 (78); Jon Holland 4/32 (11.4 overs)		417 (113.2 overs); Cameron White 104* (226); Jack Wildermuth 3/51 (16 overs)
199 (65.1 overs); Marnus Labuschagne 70 (132); Jon Holland 4/46 (13 overs)

Victoria won by an innings and 81 runs
Melbourne Cricket Ground, Melbourne
Umpires: Gerard Abood and John Ward
Player of the match: Jon Holland (Victoria)

- Queensland won the toss and elected to bat.
- Bonus points: Victoria 2.61, Queensland 0.70

4–7 November
Scorecard

Western Australia	v	New South Wales (H)
216 (84.3 overs); Ashton Turner 81 (102); Steve O'Keefe 5/65 (28.3 overs)		298 (94 overs); Nic Maddinson 116 (200); Ashton Agar 6/110 (36 overs)
177 (102.3 overs); Michael Klinger 50 (164); William Somerville 5/65 (39 overs)		7/96 (35.3 overs); Ed Cowan 25 (56); Ashton Agar 4/31 (14.3 overs)

New South Wales won by 3 wickets
Sydney Cricket Ground, Sydney
Umpires: Geoff Davidson and Phillip Gillespie
Player of the match: William Somerville (New South Wales)

- Western Australia won the toss and elected to bat.
- Ryan Gibson (New South Wales) made his first-class debut.
- Bonus Points: New South Wales 1.98, Western Australia 1.16

4–7 November
Scorecard

Tasmania	v	South Australia (H)
98 (43.4 overs); Dom Michael 17 (30); Chadd Sayers 6/32 (16 overs)		481 (116 overs); Jake Weatherald 135 (177); Cameron Stevenson 4/110 (26 overs)
289 (80.3 overs); George Bailey 142* (209); Chadd Sayers 5/44 (19.3 overs)

South Australia won by an innings and 94 runs
Adelaide Oval, Adelaide
Umpires: Ashley Barrow and Geoff Joshua
Player of the match: Chadd Sayers (South Australia)

- Tasmania won the toss and elected to bat.
- Cameron Stevenson (Tasmania) made his first-class debut.
- Bonus Points: South Australia 2.98, Tasmania 0.80

=== Round 3 ===
17–20 November
Scorecard

Victoria	v	New South Wales (H)
6/510d (160 overs); Peter Handscomb 215 (356); Doug Bollinger 2/67 (27 overs)		225 (89 overs); Kurtis Patterson 55 (122); Chris Tremain 4/22 (18 overs)
2/105d (23 overs); Marcus Harris 62* (67); Steve O'Keefe 2/6 (3 overs)		192 (81.5 overs); Daniel Hughes 54 (153); Chris Tremain 3/31 (15 overs)

Victoria won by 198 runs
Sydney Cricket Ground, Sydney
Umpires: Shawn Craig and Phillip Gillespie
Player of the match: Peter Handscomb (Victoria)

- Victoria won the toss and elected to bat.
- Bonus Points: New South Wales 0.55, Victoria 1.94

17–20 November
Scorecard

(H) Queensland	v	South Australia
7/475d (122 overs); Matt Renshaw 108 (202); Adam Zampa 4/141 (31 overs)		258 (73 overs); Alex Carey 76 (140); Luke Feldman 3/56 (15 overs)
7/228d (54 overs); Sam Heazlett 63 (92); Travis Head 2/42 (9 overs)		317 (121 overs); Jake Weatherald 73 (183); Ben Cutting 3/60 (20 overs)

Queensland won by 128 runs
Brisbane Cricket Ground, Brisbane
Umpires: Tony Wilds and Paul Wilson
Player of the match: Matt Renshaw (Queensland)

- South Australia won the toss and elected to field.
- Bonus Points: Queensland 2.43, South Australia 1.08

17–20 November
Scorecard

(H) Western Australia	v	Tasmania
262 (64.2 overs); Ashton Turner 110 (144); Simon Milenko 2/49 (11 overs)		402 (124.5 overs); Alex Doolan 202 (311); Jason Behrendorff 5/80 (34.5 overs)
345 (110.1 overs); Jonathan Wells 120 (270); Jackson Bird 3/69 (25.1 overs)		1/209 (50.5 overs); Jordan Silk 77* (149); D'Arcy Short 1/36 (7.5 overs)

Tasmania won by 9 wickets
WACA, Perth
Umpires: Michael Graham-Smith and John Ward
Player of the match: Alex Doolan (Tasmania)

- Tasmania won the toss and elected to field.
- D'Arcy Short (Western Australia) made his first-class debut.
- Bonus Points: Western Australia 1.22, Tasmania 1.90

=== Round 4 ===
26–29 November
Scorecard

South Australia	v	Victoria (H)
405 (111.3 overs); Travis Head 130 (188); Chris Tremain 4/91 (29.3 overs)		367 (105.5 overs); Aaron Finch 102 (151); Joe Mennie 4/64 (25.5 overs)
162 (46.3 overs); Travis Head 52 (97); Jon Holland 4/25 (7 overs)		5/201 (60.1 overs); Cameron White 40* (71); Kane Richardson 3/36 (13 overs)

Victoria won by 5 wickets
Melbourne Cricket Ground, Melbourne
Umpires: Michael Graham-Smith and Damien Mealey
Player of the match: Jon Holland (Victoria)

- Victoria won the toss and elected to field.
- Bonus Points: Victoria 2.11, South Australia 2.60

26–29 November
Scorecard

New South Wales	v	Tasmania (H)
5/495d (145 overs); Peter Nevill 179* (331); James Faulkner 2/35 (15 overs)		209 (100.2 overs); Jake Doran 66 (202); Trent Copeland 6/54 (33 overs)
1/128d (26 overs); Ed Cowan 66* (73); James Faulkner 1/26 (4 overs)		4/266 (104.4 overs); James Faulkner 100* (222); Trent Copeland 2/65 (25 overs)

Match drawn
Bellerive Oval, Hobart
Umpires: Gerard Abood and Mick Martell
Player of the match: Peter Nevill (New South Wales)

- Tasmania won the toss and elected to field.
- Bonus Points: Tasmania 0.37, New South Wales 1.86

26–29 November
Scorecard

(H) Queensland	v	Western Australia
422 (117.3 overs); Jack Wildermuth 93 (154); Simon Mackin 3/100 (26 overs)		6/340d (116.5 overs); Cameron Bancroft 103 (243); Michael Neser 2/50 (20 overs)
6/252d (63 overs); Michael Neser 53* (44); Mitchell Marsh 4/38 (11 overs)		237 (66.4 overs); Michael Klinger 65 (116); Ben Cutting 3/48 (14.4 overs)

Queensland won by 97 runs
Tony Ireland Stadium, Townsville
Umpires: Ashley Barrow and Shawn Craig
Player of the match: Michael Neser (Queensland)

- Queensland won the toss and elected to bat.
- Sam Truloff (Queensland) made his first-class debut.
- Bonus Points: Queensland 1.96, Western Australia 1.45

=== Round 5 ===
5–8 December (D/N)
Scorecard

(H) Tasmania	v	Victoria
203 (75.1 overs); Dom Michael 54 (85); Jon Holland 5/49 (17.1 overs)		230 (60.3 overs); Daniel Christian 93 (110); Sam Rainbird 4/25 (9.3 overs)
9/387d (123 overs); Beau Webster 122* (250); Chris Tremain 4/97 (31 overs)		8/319 (108.1 overs); Daniel Christian 79* (176); Jackson Bird 3/68 (27.1 overs)

Match drawn
Bellerive Oval, Hobart
Umpires: Ashley Barrow and Sam Nogajski
Player of the match: Beau Webster (Tasmania)

- Tasmania won the toss and elected to bat.
- Jake Hancock (Tasmania) made his first-class debut.
- Bonus Points: Tasmania 1.03, Victoria 1.30

5–8 December (D/N)
Scorecard

New South Wales	v	South Australia (H)
269 (90.4 overs); Nic Maddinson 80 (122); Kane Richardson 3/64 (22 overs)		236 (85.4 overs); Sam Raphael 61 (92); Nathan Lyon 3/63 (28.4 overs)
87 (46.5 overs); Ed Cowan 45 (100); Chadd Sayers 5/27 (18.5 overs)		8/121 (33.5 overs); Jake Lehmann 47* (62); Charlie Stobo 4/46 (11 overs)

South Australia won by 2 wickets
Adelaide Oval, Adelaide
Umpires: Greg Davidson and John Ward
Player of the match: Chadd Sayers (South Australia)

- South Australia won the toss and elected to field.
- Charlie Stobo (New South Wales) and David Grant (South Australia) both made their first-class debuts.
- Bonus Points: South Australia 1.36, New South Wales 1.69

5–8 December (D/N)
Scorecard

Queensland	v	Western Australia (H)
353 (105.5 overs); Usman Khawaja 157 (281); Simon Mackin 5/68 (31 overs)		265 (72.3 overs); Ashton Turner 100 (186); Luke Feldman 3/50 (15 overs)
138 (46.5 overs); Usman Khawaja 61 (80); Simon Mackin 6/33 (15.5 overs)		2/227 (64.5 overs); Jonathan Wells 113* (192); Luke Feldman 1/40 (13 overs)

Western Australia won by 8 wickets
WACA, Perth
Umpires: Geoff Joshua and Phillip Gillespie
Player of the match: Simon Mackin (Western Australia)

- Queensland won the toss and elected to bat.
- Bonus Points: Western Australia 1.35, Queensland 2.39

=== Round 6 ===
1–4 February
Scorecard

(H) Victoria	v	New South Wales
258 (89.1 overs); Travis Dean 67 (182); Harry Conway 3/25 (15 overs)		523 (151.1 overs); Ed Cowan 212 (386); Jon Holland 4/155 (41.1 overs)
188 (78.5 overs); Travis Dean 79* (211); William Somerville 4/68 (26.5 overs)

New South Wales won by an innings and 77 runs
Melbourne Cricket Ground, Melbourne
Umpires: Greg Davidson and Stephen Harris (SA)
Player of the match: Ed Cowan (New South Wales)

- New South Wales won the toss and elected to field.
- Will Pucovski (Victoria) made his first-class debut.
- Bonus Points: Victoria 0.98, New South Wales 2.08

1–4 February
Scorecard

Western Australia	v	South Australia (H)
201 (58.4 overs); Josh Inglis 49* (80); Chadd Sayers 5/68 (19.4 overs)		247 (52.3 overs); Jake Lehmann 77 (98); Simon Mackin 7/81 (17.3 overs)
245 (80.4 overs); Cameron Bancroft 56 (150); Kane Richardson 5/69 (16.4 overs)		192 (39.2 overs); Tom Cooper 55 (64); Simon Mackin 5/82 (18 overs)

Western Australia won by 7 runs
Glenelg Oval, Adelaide
Umpires: Shawn Craig and Tony Gillies (NZ)
Player of the match: Simon Mackin (Western Australia)

- South Australia won the toss and elected to field.
- Bonus Points: South Australia 1.47, Western Australia 1.01

1–4 February
Scorecard

(H) Queensland	v	Tasmania
9/405d (137 overs); Chris Hartley 102* (200); Cameron Stevenson 3/77 (26 overs)		200 (92.2 overs); George Bailey 55 (136); Michael Neser 3/39 (25 overs)
6/146d (39 overs); Sam Truloff 44 (33); Andrew Perrin 2/18 (8 overs)		218 (73.4 overs); Simon Milenko 68 (90); Jason Floros 3/72 (21 overs)

Queensland won by 133 runs
Brisbane Cricket Ground, Brisbane
Umpires: Gerard Abood and C. K. Nandan (Ind)
Player of the match: Chris Hartley (Queensland)

- Queensland won the toss and elected to bat.
- Andrew Perrin (Tasmania) made his first-class debut.
- Chris Hartley (Queensland) equaled Darren Berry's record of 546 dismissals by a wicket-keeper in the Sheffield Shield.
- Bonus Points: Queensland 1.71, Tasmania 0.60

=== Round 7 ===
10–13 February
Scorecard

(H) New South Wales	v	Queensland
6/603d (156 overs); Moises Henriques 265 (327); Marnus Labuschagne 2/103 (20 overs)		434 (171.5 overs); Joe Burns 108 (261); William Somerville 8/136 (58.5 overs)
		1/123f/o (38 overs); Joe Burns 88* (111); William Somerville 1/45 (19 overs)

Match drawn
Sydney Cricket Ground, Sydney
Umpires: Stephen Harris (SA) and Mick Martell
Player of the match: Moises Henriques (New South Wales)

- New South Wales won the toss and elected to bat.
- Mark Steketee (Queensland) was dismissed under a new law that allows catches to be taken after they hit a close-in fielder's helmet. Steketee was caught off the bat pad's helmet. Such a catch would be deemed not out in a Test match.
- Bonus Points: New South Wales 2.09, Queensland 1.12

10–13 February
Scorecard

(H) Tasmania	v	Western Australia
198 (51.1 overs); George Bailey 75 (111); Cameron Green 5/24 (8.1 overs)		410 (119.1 overs); Hilton Cartwright 94 (145); Cameron Stevenson 3/88 (25 overs)
265 (66.2 overs); Simon Milenko 75 (62); David Moody 4/45 (14 overs)		1/54 (9.3 overs); Hilton Cartwright 27* (17); Simon Milenko 1/18 (2.3 overs)

Western Australia won by 9 wickets
Bellerive Oval, Hobart
Umpires: Simon Fry and Simon Lightbody
Player of the match: Hilton Cartwright (Western Australia)

- Western Australia won the toss and elected to field.
- Cameron Green (Western Australia) made his first-class debut.
- Bonus Points: Tasmania 0.50, Western Australia 2.41

10–13 February
Scorecard

Victoria	v	South Australia (H)
184 (68.3 overs); Aaron Finch 49 (53); Chadd Sayers 4/40 (19 overs)		178 (52.1 overs); Jake Lehmann 92 (116); Jon Holland 4/26 (13.1 overs)
306 (91.2 overs); Aaron Finch 71 (104); Chadd Sayers 4/59 (24 overs)		188 (42.2 overs); Travis Head 47 (84); James Pattinson 3/37 (9 overs)

Victoria won by 124 runs
Adelaide Oval, Adelaide
Umpires: C. K. Nandan (Ind) and Paul Wilson
Player of the match: James Pattinson (Victoria)

- South Australia won the toss and elected to field.
- Sam Harper (Victoria) was hospitalized after being struck on the head by Jake Lehmann's bat. Victoria asked to be allowed to replace Harper with a concussion sub but their request was denied in fear of the game forfeiting its first-class status. Concussion substitutes are, however, allowed in all domestic one-day and Twenty20 games.
- Bonus Points: Victoria 1.00, South Australia 1.00

=== Round 8 ===
25–28 February
Scorecard

(H) New South Wales	v	Tasmania
253 (76.2 overs); Ed Cowan 115 (205); Simon Milenko 4/60 (15 overs)		490 (160.4 overs); George Bailey 200* (389); William Somerville 5/99 (31.4 overs)
1/141 (43 overs); Daniel Hughes 71* (126); Sam Rainbird 1/43 (12 overs)

Match drawn
North Dalton Park, Wollongong
Umpires: Damien Mealey and John Ward
Player of the match: George Bailey (Tasmania)

- Tasmania won the toss and elected to field.
- No play was possible on day 4 due to rain and a wet outfield.
- New South Wales 1.03, Tasmania 1.67

25–28 February
Scorecard

Queensland	v	South Australia (H)
218 (80.4 overs); James Peirson 50 (120); Adam Zampa 6/62 (21.4 overs)		156 (61.1 overs); Jake Lehmann 59 (110); Jack Wildermuth 5/40 (11 overs)
216 (80.3 overs); James Peirson 71 (91); Adam Zampa 4/57 (19.3 overs)		4/279 (83.1 overs); Tom Cooper 119* (168); Marnus Labuschagne 1/35 (7 overs)

South Australia won by 6 wickets
Adelaide Oval, Adelaide
Umpires: Ashley Barrow and Geoff Joshua
Player of the match: Adam Zampa (South Australia)

- Queensland won the toss and elected to bat.
- Bonus Points: South Australia 1.00, Queensland 1.18

25–28 February
Scorecard

Victoria	v	Western Australia (H)
117 (34.2 overs); Daniel Christian 39 (46); Jason Behrendorff 9/37 (13.2 overs)		285 (80.5 overs); Jonathan Wells 70 (168); Chris Tremain 3/51 (20 overs)
130 (50.3 overs); Aaron Finch 65* (133); Jason Behrendorff 5/52 (15.3 overs)

Western Australia won by an innings and 38 runs
WACA, Perth
Umpires: Greg Davidson and Tony Wilds
Player of the match: Jason Behrendorff (Western Australia)

- Victoria won the toss and elected to bat.
- Seb Gotch (Victoria) made his first-class debut.
- Jason Behrendorff (Western Australia) took figures of 9 for 37 in the first innings, the fifth-best figures in Sheffield Shield history.
- Bonus Points: Western Australia 1.85, Victoria 1.00

=== Round 9 ===
7–10 March
Scorecard

South Australia	v	New South Wales (H)
229 (68.1 overs); Callum Ferguson 75 (158); Pat Cummins 4/57 (18 overs)		434 (110.4 overs); Ed Cowan 125 (216); Daniel Worrall 5/85 (25 overs)
304 (94.1 overs); Callum Ferguson 103 (204); Pat Cummins 4/47 (18 overs)		2/100 (13 overs); Ed Cowan 48* (39); Daniel Worrall 1/22 (3 overs)

New South Wales won by 8 wickets
Sydney Cricket Ground, Sydney
Umpires: Michael Graham-Smith and Paul Wilson
Player of the match: Pat Cummins (New South Wales)

- South Australia won the toss and elected to bat.
- Just 51 overs of play were possible on day 1 due to rain.
- Bonus Points: New South Wales 2.86, South Australia 0.89

7–10 March
Scorecard

(H) Tasmania	v	Queensland
150 (51.2 overs); Simon Milenko 39 (49); Peter George 3/17 (11.2 overs)		437 (127.1 overs); Jack Wildermuth 110 (157); Andrew Perrin 3/98 (24 overs)
115 (44.3 overs); Jake Hancock 20 (51); Cameron Gannon 3/12 (13.3 overs)

Queensland won by an innings and 172 runs
Bellerive Oval, Hobart
Umpires: Gerard Abood and Phillip Gillespie
Player of the match: Jack Wildermuth (Queensland)

- Queensland won the toss and elected to field.
- Bonus Points: Tasmania 0.50, Queensland 1.96

8–11 March
Scorecard

Western Australia	v	Victoria (H)
146 (51.3 overs); Ashton Turner 59 (84); Fawad Ahmed 3/14 (7.3 overs)		322 (112.3 overs); Chris Tremain 111 (232); David Moody 5/59 (28 overs)
258 (114.4 overs); Hilton Cartwright 101 (193); James Pattinson 5/58 (21 overs)		2/83 (19 overs); Marcus Harris 43 (50); Simon Mackin 1/18 (6 overs)

Victoria won by 8 wickets
Traeger Park, Alice Springs
Umpires: Shawn Craig and Sam Nogajski
Player of the match: Chris Tremain (Victoria)

- Victoria won the toss and elected to field.
- Bonus Points: Victoria 1.84, Western Australia 0.70

=== Round 10 ===
16–19 March
Scorecard

South Australia	v	Tasmania (H)
225 (63 overs); Jake Weatherald 46 (58); Sam Rainbird 4/50 (16 overs)		332 (97.1 overs); Ben McDermott 104 (232); Joe Mennie 5/67 (20.1 overs)
406 (117.1 overs); Callum Ferguson 90 (206); Gabe Bell 4/97 (27 overs)		106 (29.4 overs); Sam Rainbird 33 (19); Joe Mennie 4/21 (8 overs)

South Australia won by 193 runs
Bellerive Oval, Hobart
Umpires: Shawn Craig and Mick Martell
Player of the match: Joe Mennie (South Australia)

- Tasmania won the toss and elected to field.
- Johnathan Dalton (South Australia) and Gabe Bell (Tasmania) both made their first-class debuts.
- Ben McDermott (Tasmania) scored his maiden first-class century.
- Bonus Points: Tasmania 2.32, South Australia 1.25

16–19 March
Scorecard

(H) Queensland	v	Victoria
208 (67.4 overs); Chris Hartley 57 (84); Chris Tremain 3/41 (13 overs)		280 (96.2 overs); Rob Quiney 57 (100); Michael Neser 4/74 (20.2 overs)
61 (22 overs); Chris Hartley 18 (44); James Pattinson 5/7 (6 overs)

Victoria won by an innings and 11 runs
Allan Border Field, Brisbane
Umpires: Simon Fry and Sam Nogajski
Player of the match: James Pattinson (Victoria)

- Victoria won the toss and elected to field.
- Rain reduced play to just 73 overs on day 1, and just 56 overs on day 2.
- Bonus Points: Queensland 1.08, Victoria 1.80

16–19 March
Scorecard

(H) Western Australia	v	New South Wales
9/436d (114 overs); Cameron Bancroft 104 (200); Harry Conway 2/58 (20 overs)		309 (99.2 overs); Ed Cowan 69 (87); Jason Behrendorff 4/70 (23 overs)
4/275d (62 overs); Hilton Cartwright 170* (173); Trent Copeland 3/72 (21 overs)		396 (96.2 overs); Daniel Hughes 110 (138); Ashton Turner 6/111 (31.2 overs)

Western Australia won by 6 runs
WACA, Perth
Umpires: Gerard Abood and Paul Wilson
Player of the match: Hilton Cartwright (Western Australia)

- New South Wales won the toss and elected to field.
- Bonus Points: Western Australia 2.82, New South Wales 1.59

== Final ==
26–30 March
Scorecard

(H) Victoria	v	South Australia
487 (166.2 overs); Marcus Harris 120 (189); Chadd Sayers 7/84 (34.2 overs)		287 (84.3 overs); Jake Weatherald 60 (133); Jon Holland 7/82 (26.3 overs)
323 (122.5 overs); Aaron Finch 83 (149); Travis Head 2/31 (7 overs)		6/236 (65 overs); Travis Head 137* (172); Fawad Ahmed 3/81 (21 overs)

Match drawn
Traeger Park, Alice Springs
Umpires: Simon Fry and Paul Wilson
Player of the match: Jon Holland (Victoria)

- Victoria won the toss and elected to bat.
- Alex Carey (South Australia) took his 59th dismissal of the tournament, a record for wicket-keeper in a single Sheffield Shield season.

== Statistics ==
=== Most runs ===
Player	Team	Mat	Inns	NO	Runs	Ave	HS	100	50
Ed Cowan	New South Wales	9	16	3	959	73.76	212	3	5
Hilton Cartwright	Western Australia	10	18	2	861	53.81	170*	2	5
George Bailey	Tasmania	9	17	3	839	59.92	200*	2	4
Marcus Harris	Victoria	11	20	1	808	42.52	120	2	4
Moises Henriques	New South Wales	9	13	1	775	64.58	265	2	4

=== Most wickets ===
Player	Team	Mat	Inns	Overs	Wkts	Ave	BBI	SR
Chadd Sayers	South Australia	11	21	446.2	62	19.00	7/84	43.10
Jon Holland	Victoria	11	19	361	50	20.78	7/82	43.30
Chris Tremain	Victoria	10	19	296.1	42	18.97	4/22	42.30
Jason Behrendorff	Western Australia	7	13	212.4	37	17.59	9/37	34.40
William Somerville	New South Wales	7	13	324	35	23.14	8/136	55.50
