= University of Tasmania Cricket Club =

Tasmania University Cricket Club
- Founded: 1898
- Home ground: University Oval, Tasmania
- Colours: Red/Black/White
- President: Gene Phair
- Head coach: Damien Wright
- Captain: Param Uppal (1st Grade), Tom Roberts (2nd Grade), Hayden Honeywood (3rd Grade), Finn Blizzard (U18), Mitchell Woolford (U16)
- 2024-25: Premiers (1st Grade), 5th (2nd Grade), 7th (3rd Grade), 3rd (U16), Runners up (U18)

The University of Tasmania Cricket Club, also known as the "Lions", represent the University of Tasmania in Tasmania's Grade Cricket Competition. Although many of the players are students, or former students it is not compulsory to be so, in order to play for the cricket club.

The Tasmanian University Cricket Club was founded in 1898, just eight years after the University itself was founded. Despite being founded over 60 years earlier, TUCC did not get accepted into TCA competitions until the 1960–61 season.

TUCC have won six TCA premierships, including back to back wins in 1985–86 and 1986–87.

TUCC competes in the TCA competition on Saturdays and Sundays from October to March. They have senior teams in First Grade, Second Grade, Third Grade and Fourth Grade (KSCA 5th Grade) and junior teams including U17, U15, U13, Hurricanes Stage 1&2 and Woolworths Master Blasters and Junior Blasters. The competition consists of a mix of two-day, one-day and T20 matches.

== Honours ==
TCA Premierships:

First Grade - (7) 1974–75, 1977–78, 1985–86, 1986–87, 1999–2000, 2008–2009, 2020–21

Kookaburra Cup One Day (7) - 1995–96, 1999–00, 2000–01, 2003–04, 2012–13, 2017–18, 2020–21

Twenty20 (2) - 2005–06, 2010–11, 2022-23

Twenty20 Statewide (1) - 2010-11

Women’s 2nd Grade T20 (1) - 2020-21

Emerson Rodwell Medallists - Ray Brown (80/81), Graeme Cunningham (03/04), Andrew Kealy (09/10), Josh Marquet (99/00), Brad Thomas (93/94, 95/96, 98/99)

Kim Fazackerley Medallists - Amanda Silva (09/10), Sterre Kalis (17/18), Ashley Day (18/19)

== Notable current players ==
James Faulkner, Tim Paine, Jake Doran, Tim Ward (cricketer), Brad Hope, Timothy Oakley.

== Notable past players ==
Ben Hilfenhaus, Andrew Perrin, Brad Thomas, Rhett Lockyear, Sterre Kalis, Julia Price, Eldine Baptiste, Josh Marquet, Jamie Cox, Dene Hills, Jason Krejza, Ben Laughlin, Graeme Cunningham, Darren McNees, John Hampshire, Tony Daly, Ray Brown, Hassan Azad, Joe Mennie, Sasha Moloney, Katelyn Fryett, Maddie Blazely.
