= Music Saves Lives =

American non-profit organization encouraging blood donation

Music Saves Lives is an American not-for-profit 501(c)(3) organization and is listed in the Internal Revenue Service publication 78.

Established in January 2006 by founder Russel Hornbeek in Seal Beach, California, Music Saves Lives has educated students and encouraged over 250,000 summer blood donations from youth under the age of 25. This organization has been honored by the American Red Cross Blood Services six years in a row for organizing the largest national collection of blood from youth ages 16 to 25 during the summer months of June, July and August.

Music Saves Lives has attributed its record-setting blood-donor recruitment to reaching students in "lifestyle" music partnering. Each summer, Music Saves Lives partners with the largest summer concert tour that has 17 years experience, the Vans Warped Tour. Young blood donors receive a music-related incentive, such as a meet-and-greet with a notable band, music downloads, and backstage VIP passes distributed by the blood centers.

Since 2007, the Gibson Guitar Corporation has teamed up with Music Saves Lives and donated several guitars to be designed by various artists (Mike Oncley, Ryan Seaman, Cory Burke, Josh Kenyon, Colby Nichols, Andrew Holder, Sara Antoinette Martin), signed by bands (Bad Religion, Pennywise, Coheed and Cambria, Reel Big Fish, NOFX, Bouncing Souls, Thrice, Katy Perry, Meg and Dia, Jack's Mannequin) and then auctioned off to support the non-profit.

In 2011, Music Saves Lives and Smorgasbord Productions created the first full-length animated public service announcement (PSA). This PSA animation features the band 3oh!3 and the animated cast from Supa Pirate Booty Hunt, an adult-style cartoon featuring a booty-loving pirate and his side kick, Daniel the Turtle. The PSA animation entered the Burbank International Film Festival and won six film festival awards for: Best Character Design / Best Production Design / Best Art Direction / Best Sound Editing / Best Voice Acting / Best Writing (Animation / Original).

In January 2012, rapper Coolio represented Music Saves Lives in the Food Network reality series Rachael vs. Guy: Celebrity Cook-Off.

At the 2012 Comic Con Event, Music Saves Lives premiered the second Smorgasbord animation production called "Metal in My Shell" with metal-rock star, and lead singer in the band Megadeth, Dave Mustaine. Mustaine shares a rock off with character Captain Zack to prove that he is god of all metal, while promoting a life-saving message about donating blood.
