= Jarrod Freeman =

Australian cricketer (born 2000)

Personal information
- Full name: Jarrod Allan Freeman
- Born: 15 July 2000 (age 26); Launceston, Tasmania, Australia
- Nickname: Froggy
- Height: 1.75 m (5 ft 9 in)
- Batting: Right-handed
- Bowling: Right-arm off break
- Role: Bowling all-rounder

Domestic team information
- Years: Team
- 2017/18–2024/25: Tasmania (squad no. 19)
- 2018/19: Hobart Hurricanes (squad no. 19)

Career statistics
Competition	FC	LA	T20
Matches	30	3	2
Runs scored	776	4	–
Batting average	21.55	4.00	–
100s/50s	0/3	0/0	–
Top score	63*	4	–
Balls bowled	4,845	102	24
Wickets	59	3	1
Bowling average	46.50	29.00	37.00
5 wickets in innings	0	0	0
10 wickets in match	0	–	–
Best bowling	4/72	2/17	1/26
Catches/stumpings	6/–	1/–	0/–
- Source: ESPNcricinfo, 9 March 2024

Jarrod Allan Freeman (born 15 July 2000) is an Australian cricketer. He made his first-class debut for Tasmania in the 2017–18 Sheffield Shield season on 24 February 2018. Prior to his first-class debut, he was part of Australia's squad for the 2018 Under-19 Cricket World Cup. In 2019, Freeman was added to the Hobart Hurricanes squad to replace Johan Botha, who retired mid-season. He made his Twenty20 debut for the Hobart Hurricanes in the 2018–19 Big Bash League season on 29 January 2019. He made his List A debut for Tasmania, on 1 October 2019, in the 2019–20 Marsh One-Day Cup.
