= Brad Thomas (cricketer) =

Australian cricketer (born 1972)

Personal information
- Full name: Bradley John Thomas
- Born: 18 January 1972 (age 54); Hobart, Tasmania
- Batting: Right-handed
- Bowling: Right-arm medium

Domestic team information
- Years: Team
- 2001/02: Tasmania

Career statistics
Competition	First-class	List A
Matches	1	4
Runs scored	25	48
Batting average	12.50	24.00
100s/50s	0/0	0/0
Top score	21	16*
Balls bowled	48	90
Wickets	1	1
Bowling average	52.00	74.00
5 wickets in innings	0	0
10 wickets in match	0	0
Best bowling	1/52	1/15
Catches/stumpings	0/–	1/–
- Source: Cricinfo, 25 August 2010

Bradley John Thomas (born 18 January 1972) is an Australian cricket player, who played a single first-class match and three List A matches for Tasmania in 2001–02.

Brad Thomas is a middle-order allrounder, playing for University of Tasmania Cricket Club. He was born in Hobart in 1972.
