= Param Uppal =

Australian cricketer (born 1998)

Personal information
- Full name: Param Uppal
- Born: 25 October 1998 (age 28); Chandigarh, India
- Batting: Right-handed
- Bowling: Right-arm off break
- Role: Batsman

Domestic team information
- Years: Team
- 2017–present: New South Wales (squad no. 18)
- 2017/18: Cricket Australia XI (squad no. 3)
- First-class debut: 3 March 2018 New South Wales v Victoria
- Last First-class: 14 March 2018 New South Wales v Queensland
- List A debut: 27 September 2017 Cricket Australia XI v South Australia
- Last List A: 17 October 2017 Cricket Australia XI v Western Australia

Career statistics
Competition	FC	LA
Matches	2	6
Runs scored	72	83
Batting average	18.00	16.60
100s/50s	0/0	0/0
Top score	24	32
Balls bowled	180	30
Wickets	0	0
Bowling average	–	–
5 wickets in innings	–	–
10 wickets in match	–	–
Best bowling	–	–
Catches/stumpings	1/–	0/–
- Source: ESPNcricinfo, 4 August 2019

Param Uppal (born 25 October 1998) is an Australian cricketer of Indian origin. He made his List A debut for Cricket Australia XI in the 2017–18 JLT One-Day Cup on 27 September 2017. He made his first-class debut for New South Wales in the 2017–18 Sheffield Shield season on 3 March 2018.

== Early life ==
Uppal was born in 1998 in Chandigarh, India. He moved with his parents to Australia at the age of four.

== Domestic career ==
Uppal was chosen to be part of the Cricket Australia XI squad for the 2017–18 JLT One-Day Cup. He made his List A debut against South Australia in the first match on 27 September, and went on to play all six matches for the tournament, though he only averaged 16.60 with the bat and was unable to take any wickets. Param continues to play first grade cricket for University in Hobart, Tasmania. In 2024 Param finished first in the batting and bowing aggregates and averages scoring 757 at 68.82, and taking 34 wickets at 12.91.

== International career ==
In December 2017, he was named in Australia's squad for the 2018 Under-19 Cricket World Cup.
