= Australians in Italy =

Australian individuals who travel to Italy on a permanent or/and temporary basis

Regions with significant populations
- Veneto Calabria Rome Milian Sicily
- Rome: 30,000
- Milan: 10,000

Languages
- Australian English and Italian

Religion
- Roman Catholic Protestant

Related ethnic groups
- Italian Australians, Australian diaspora, Australians

Australians in Italy consist of Australian individuals who travel to Italy on a permanent or/and temporary basis. There were over 30,000 Australians in Italy as of 2002, including dual citizens (Italian Australians). Approximately two-thirds are settled in Rome while the rest are mainly in Milan. Australian expatriates in Italy over the age of 15 account for 5.9% (172,000) of all Australian expatriates, in comparison to the United Kingdom accounting for 33.4% (969,000) within 1999–2003. 12.6% of these individuals entered Italy with a tertiary education. Australian tourism within Italy accounted for 1.3% of total tourism within Italy, and staying on average 10.5 nights within 2018. Australian tourists stay longer on average in Italy than other tourists visiting for non-UE countries. Australia and Italy have a bilateral relationship regarding trade developments such as agreements surrounding free trade, partnership in building security measures, and international relation schemes such as Brexit. Australia has various other agreements with Italy including a working holiday visa, defence industry cooperation, and economic and commercial cooperation agreements. Australia has two embassies in Italy, one in Rome and the other in Milan. These bodies manage public diplomacy and collaborate with Australian companies such as 'Screen Australia' to produce films within the Italian landscape.

Italian Australians, Dual citizens, Australian expatriates, Australian International students, Roman Catholic priests, Australian tourists are amongst many other Australian individuals who travel to Italy. The COVID-19 pandemic (2019–2021) has made it difficult for Australians to travel to Italy including an international travel ban, and limited flight carriers operating. A minority of Australian Italian individuals have migrated back to Italy to be re-assimilated into their cultural heritage. Australian Italians also travel back to Italy short term to visit relatives and friends. Australian tourists and International students travel to Italy to study or observe the historical sites. Australian Roman Catholic priests and other religious leaders travel to Italy for meetings with Vatican officials such as the Vatican II meeting, or for other Religious vocation such as study.

== Demographics ==
Australians entering Italy must have a valid Australian passport (validity of a minimum of three months) and may require Schengen visa corresponding to the amount of time they intend on staying in Italy whether that is on a permanent or temporary basis. From 1991 until 2003, 32,863 Australians departed for Italy from Australia. There are various categories of Australians departures including returning Italian migrants, individuals with Italian heritage, dual-citizens, and expatriates. Australians who arrive in Italy and intend to work and stay for a period longer than 90 days must obtain a residency permit, complemented by a residency contact (employer). There are three types of permits; 3–12 month stay, 12–24 month stay, 2–5 year stay. Statistics show that from 2007, 35.8% of Australian departures were permanent whilst 63.9% were long term individuals of ages 20–39. While, figures from 2007 to 2012 demonstrate individuals 25–39 account for the majority of Australian departures to Italy on both permanent and temporary basis. In 2006, a study of 7,900 Australians overseas were Italian-born, whilst 60.8% had an Italian heritage. In 2007, the majority of the 30,000 Australians in Italy were positioned in Rome (two-thirds), whilst 10,000 were in Milan. Within this population, 18,000 are dual-nationals. The Australian embassy in Rome stated that there is a decline in short-term and permanent basis Australians in Italy.

There is a low percentage (13%) of Australians in Italy with a high level of education, however there is a large percentage of Australians with highly qualified jobs within Italy. Therefore, immigration studies suggest that 87% of those with no education are returning migrants who moved to Australia on a temporary basis, to the labour force which had low qualified jobs.

== COVID-19 ==
On 8 March 2020 the COVID-19 pandemic put the majority of Italy in lockdown due to the high number of coronavirus cases. The Lombardy, Veneto and Emilia-Romagna regions that had a high number of cases and, put major cities such as Milan on lockdown. During this lockdown, educational institutions, tourist attractions, offices and other businesses were forced to closed or to operate remotely, and a regional travel ban was put in place. This ban impacted 16 million people. Australia placed an overseas travel ban, to its citizens. They are only allowed to exit the country with an exception from the Australian Department of Home Affairs. A level 3 non-essential travel advisory was put into place. This impacted millions of Australians from entering Italy. Australians were only able to leave Australia with an exemption. The economic impact in Italy within the first three months recorded a 200 million euro impact.

== Australians in the Vatican ==
=== The Vatican II Council ===
The Vatican II Council announced by Pope John XXIII on 11 October 1962 was an Ecumenical Council that sought to modernise the Roman Catholic church. It consisted of a four-year congregation of religious figures such as bishops and scholars participating in various debates, and resulting in various religious documents containing liturgical doctrines and a renewed practice of the Catholic faith being written.

=== Eris O'Brien ===
Eris O'Brien (1895–1974) born in Condobolin, New South Wales, Australia was an archbishop and academic who has written various published letters and books such as "The Dawn of Catholicism in Australia". O'Brien ventured to Rome firstly in September 1934, to gain knowledge about Cardinal Francis Moran's life as he was selected to write a bibliography on his legacy. He returned to Rome in 1962 to attend the Vatican II meeting. In this vocation, O'Brien delivered a speech of the third intervention on marital notions inspired by his previous publications. This intervention can be found in the "Acta Synodalia".

=== Cardinal Sir Norman Thomas Gilroy ===
Cardinal Sir Norman Thomas Gilroy (1896–1977) born in Glebe, Sydney, was a theologian and Archbishop who attended the Vatican II meeting from 1962 until 1965. Gilroy was a member of the Council of Presidency. His scholarship within this council entitled him to direct debates. However, he was later demoted due to the inclusion of more knowledgeable theologists, which consequently led to the repudiation of his contributions. It was to his discretion that higher authoritative figures such as the Pope and his Government at the time to make such decisions. Gilroy expressed his concern within the first session of the meeting to withstand following the teachings of the writings of the council, more specifically those of "De Ecclesia".

=== Post Vatican II council ===
The Synod for the bishops of Oceania was a Catholic gathering of bishops from Australasia in the Vatican. It was initiated by Pope John Paul II. The synod began in November 1998, and consisted of 117 bishops that aimed to modernise the traditional views of the Vatican, and appropriate them to suit the Australasian community. The Vatican officials however, did not agree on the practices and ideas of the Australian bishops, and thus, has created tension between the Australasian and Roman bishops. This disagreement is seen in the "Statement of Conclusions" written by the Vatican officials before the meeting came to a resolution.

== Return migration of Italian Australians ==
=== Italian migration ===
In 2016, there were 174,042 first-generation Italian-Australians within Australia 40.5% (70,527) settling in Victoria, and 28.4% (49,476) settling in New South Wales. 86.3% of these Italian-Australians in 2016 arrived before 2007. During and post WWII, there was heavy industrialisation of weaponry and agriculture within Australia, providing an abundance of job opportunities. Conversely, in Italy post WWII there was a downturn in industrialisation, resulting in increased unemployment rates, and a heavy deflation in their economy. There was a large economic separation between the Northern and Southern parts of Italy, which catalysed a further downturn in their economy, affecting individuals' abilities to meet their basic needs. The Italians were prompted by the government to leave and migrate to other countries. Australia aimed to increase their population by 1% per year (75,000). Arthur Carwell, Australia's first minister of Immigration, introduced an assisted passage scheme in 1952 with the United Kingdom which was later adjusted and formally opened to Italy after a small reduction in Immigration rates. Within this scheme, Italians were selected by the Italian Ministry of Labor and Social Security to be employed in industrial and agricultural jobs that lacked employees. The Italian and Australian government divided the cost for these individuals to migrate.

=== Italian Australians in Italy ===
Within 1960–1975, of 90,000 Italian migrants, 22% of Italian Australians returned to Italy for permanent residence. This on average was after over a decade of living in Australia, and constituted both Italian born, and Australian born individuals with Italian heritage. Associazione Nazionale Emigrati ed Ex emigrati in Australia (ANEA) is an organization which began in 1976 in Italy, in an attempt to reintegrate Italian Australians back into Italy, whilst maintaining a connection with Australia. The organisation was later known to the Ministry of Foreign Affairs facilitates conferences each year placing emphasis on social and cultural reintegration. Within the 1970s many Italian-Australians from Queensland, New South Wales, Victoria, and South Australia returned to Veneto, Trentino and Calabria within both North and Southern regions of Italy.

== Australian tourism to Italy ==
Between the 19th and 20th century Australians who visited Italy for tourism purposes entailed British Australians. These individuals were exposed to the Roman Catholic sector of Christianity which conflicted with their Protestant views. Within the 1950s Italian Australians were also a predominant group of Australian tourism in Italy. Within 2006, 70% of Australians leaving Australia consisted of individuals going to visit relatives within different countries. The large population of Italian Australians within Australia have influenced tourism to Italy due to their migrant cultural influence on Australians. This familiarised Australians with the Italian culture and created a sense of curiosity, directing more tourists to Italy. Within this period, the modernisation of the Italian film industry introduced Australians to the culture and landscape of Italy with the work of directors such as De Sica.

Australian tourists staying in Italy for a period under 90 days within a 180-day period do not require a Schengen visa. As of 2021, Australians must obtain ETIAS authorisation in 2021. This authorisation will be valid for a period of five years. Within the last two decades, a stronger relationship between Italy and Australia, and the evolution of transport systems has further increased Australian tourism into Italy. In 2011–2012, 51.5% of inbound arrivals to Italy were tourists. However, due to the COVID-19 pandemic in 2020, 90% of accommodation and travel bookings were cancelled in Rome, and 80% cancelled in Sicily.

=== Educational tourism ===
Educational Tourism is the concept of individual's traveling to a foreign place to learn, experiment and thus, report on foreign historical, social, and cultural contexts. Australian educational tourism volume increased within the 1970s. The predominant regions of Italy to be visited by Australian scholars entails Rome, Florence and Venice, however the scope of education is not limited to these cities. Scholars have the ability to travel elsewhere to conduct primary research as a result of the boom in globalisation. The University of Sydney (NSW, Australia) within the 1980s introduced an educational Alumni travel program. Similarly, Wollongong Universities (NSW, Australia) introduced a similar program called "Odyssey Travel". These programs opened the opportunity for Australians to travel and study abroad in Italy whilst also conducting their university degrees.

== Notable Australians in Italy ==
- Christian Vieri (1973), footballer
- Massimiliano Rosolino (1978), swimmer

== See also ==
- Australian diaspora
- Australia–Italy relations
- Immigration to Italy
- Italian Australians
