= Rachael vs. Guy: Celebrity Cook-Off =

- Genre: Cooking; Competition
- Starring: Rachael Ray; Guy Fieri
- Country of origin: United States
- No. of seasons: 3
- No. of episodes: 18

Production
- Running time: 60 minutes

Original release
- Network: Food Network
- Release: January 1, 2012 – February 10, 2014

Rachael vs. Guy: Celebrity Cook-Off is an American cooking competition series that premiered on Food Network on January 1, 2012. The series puts Team Captains Rachael Ray and Guy Fieri against each other in determining who is the best cooking mentor toward their team of four celebrities. Each week, one celebrity will be eliminated, with the "last star standing" winning a $50,000.00 cash donation toward their charity. The series premiere earned 3.524 million viewers, and a rating of 1.1; it ranked 3rd overall in the cable ratings that night. The second season premiered on January 6, 2013, the third season on January 13, 2014.

== Season One ==
=== Participating celebrities ===
In the premiere episode, Guy & Rachael played "roshambo" to determine who would pick first for their teams. Guy won (paper beating rock) and chose first. Here are how the teams were chosen, and what charity each celebrity was supporting:

| Celebrity | Occupation | Team | Charity | Status |
|---|---|---|---|---|
| Aaron Carter | Platinum Recording Artist | Rachael | Kids Beating Cancer | Eliminated 1st on January 1, 2012 |
| Alyssa Campanella | Miss USA 2011 | Guy | Susan G. Komen for the Cure | Eliminated 2nd on January 8, 2012 |
| Cheech Marin | Actor & Comedian | Guy | Hispanic Scholarship Fund | Eliminated 3rd on January 15, 2012 |
| Summer Sanders | Gold Medal Olympian | Rachael | Right To Play | Eliminated 4th on January 22, 2012 |
| Taylor Dayne | Multi-Platinum Recording Artist | Rachael | Cambodian Children's Fund | Eliminated 5th on January 29, 2012 |
| Joey Fatone | Singer & Television Personality | Guy | Fatone Family Foundation | Eliminated 6th on January 29, 2012 |
| Coolio | Grammy Winning Rapper | Guy | Music Saves Lives | Runner-up on January 29, 2012 |
| **Lou Diamond Phillips** | **Actor** | **Rachael** | **No Kid Hungry** | **Winner** **on January 29, 2012** |

=== Celebrity progress ===
| No. | Contestant | Episode | | | | | |
| No. | Contestant | 1 | 2 | 3 | 4 | 5 | 6 |
|---|---|---|---|---|---|---|---|
| 1 | Lou | IN | IN | LOW | IN | **WIN** | **WINNER** |
| 2 | Coolio | **WIN** | IN | **WIN** | **WIN** | **WIN** | **RUNNER-UP** |
| 3 | Joey | **WIN** | IN | LOW | **WIN** | **OUT** | |
| 4 | Taylor | LOW | IN | **WIN** | LOW | **OUT** | |
| 5 | Summer | IN | LOW | **WIN** | **OUT** | | |
| 6 | Cheech | **WIN** | IN | **OUT** | | | |
| 7 | Alyssa | **WIN** | **OUT** | | | | |
| 8 | Aaron | **OUT** | | | | | |

(WIN) The celebrity won the series.
(RUNNER-UP) The celebrity was the runner-up of the series.
(WIN) The celebrity won the task.
(IN) The celebrity lost the task but was not in the bottom two.
(LOW) The celebrity competed in and won the cook-off to advance to the next round.
(OUT) The celebrity lost that week's cook-off and was eliminated from the competition.

=== Episodes ===
==== Episode One: Celebrity Food Festival ====
As described above, the teams are chosen and given their first task: supply food for the first ever Celebrity Cook-Off Food Festival, to be attended by 150 people. Each person is given a token to give to the celebrity who, in their opinion, made the best dish. The team with the most tokens wins the task and is safe from elimination. The two members of the losing team with the least tokens will have a 10-minute "secret ingredient" cook-off to determine who advances and who is eliminated (similar to the "Secret Ingredient Showdown" in the 2011 The Next Iron Chef: Super Chefs competition).

Each team had a 90-minute brainstorming session with their coach to determine the overall theme for their dishes, then was given two hours to cook their dishes before serving them to the Festival-goers.

- Team Rachael's food theme: "Hot in the City" (Spicy Foods)
- Team Guy's food theme: Mexican Foods
- Winning team: Team Guy
- Bottom 2 Cook-Off Participants: Aaron Carter and Taylor Dayne
- Elimination Cook-Off Secret Ingredient: Shrimp
- Advanced: Taylor Dayne
- Eliminated: Aaron Carter

==== Episode Two: Let Them Eat Cake ====
The contestants make desserts judged by 13 pastry students and instructors. Each of the 13-student panel would grade the contestants' dishes on four different scores.

- Winning team: Tie (Each team received 26 points out of a maximum of 52)
- Bottom 2 Cook-Off Participants: Alyssa Campanella and Summer Sanders (Due to the tie, the team captains were chosen for the cook-off.)
- Elimination Cook-Off Assignment: Salad
- Advanced: Summer Sanders
- Eliminated: Alyssa Campanella

==== Episode Three: Chopping Block ====
The remaining six have one-on-one battles, to prepare favorite dishes of three judges from Chopped. (Note: winners' names appear in bold)

- Marcus Samuelsson (Fried chicken): **Coolio** vs. Lou Diamond Phillips
- Scott Conant (Tomato & basil pasta sauce): **Taylor Dayne** vs. Joey Fatone
- Alex Guarnaschelli (Porterhouse steak): **Summer Sanders** vs. Cheech Marin
- Winning team: Team Rachael (2 out of 3 rounds)
- Bottom 3 Cook-Off Participants: Lou Diamond Phillips, Cheech Marin, and Joey Fatone
- Elimination Cook-Off Assignment: Grilled cheese sandwich
- Advanced: Joey Fatone and Lou Diamond Phillips
- Eliminated: Cheech Marin

==== Episode Four: Food Lunch Trucks ====
The remaining five are asked to run food trucks

- Winning team: Team Guy
- Bottom 2 Cook-Off Participants: Taylor Dayne and Summer Sanders
- Elimination Cook Off Assignment: Amuse-bouche
- Advanced: Taylor Dayne
- Eliminated: Summer Sanders

==== Episode Five: Friends and Family Favorites ====
The remaining four are asked to cater a three-course dinner for ten.

- Advanced: Coolio, Lou Diamond Phillips
- Bottom 2 Cook-Off Participants: Joey Fatone, Taylor Dayne
- Elimination Cook Off Assignment: Use anything in the pantry
- Third Place: Joey Fatone (Fried rice)
- Fourth place: Taylor Dayne (Matzah ball soup)

==== Episode Six: Restaurant Battle ====
The final two are asked to run their own restaurants, to be judged by Tim and Nina Zagat, based on comments of 40 diners.

- Winning team: Team Rachael
- Winner: Lou Diamond Phillips (28/30)
- Runner-up: Coolio (23/30)

== Season Two ==
=== Participating celebrities ===
| Celebrity | Occupation | Team | Charity | Status |
|---|---|---|---|---|
| Gilbert Gottfried | Actor & Comedian | Rachael | The Gift of Laughter: The Friars | Eliminated 1st on January 6, 2013 |
| Cornelia Guest | Fashion designer, Author and Philanthropist | Guy | Humane Society of New York | Eliminated 2nd on January 13, 2013 |
| Chilli | Grammy Winning R&B Artist | Guy | Cat's Crew | Eliminated 3rd on January 20, 2013 |
| Johnny Weir | Figure Skater | Guy | Human Rights Campaign Foundation | Eliminated 4th on January 27, 2013 |
| Kathy Najimy | Actress | Rachael | PETA | Eliminated 5th on February 3, 2013 |
| Hines Ward | Former NFL Player & Super Bowl MVP | Rachael | Hines Ward Helping Hands Foundation | Eliminated 5th on February 3, 2013 |
| Carnie Wilson | Singer & Television Personality | Rachael | Autism Research Institute | Runner-up on February 10, 2013 |
| Dean McDermott | Reality Television Star & Actor | Guy | Miracle Babies | Winner on February 10, 2013 |

=== Celebrity progress ===
| Contestant | Episode | | | | | |
| Contestant | 1 | 2 | 3 | 4 | 5 | 6 |
|---|---|---|---|---|---|---|
| Dean | WIN | LOW | LOW | WIN | WIN | WINNER |
| Carnie | IN | WIN | WIN | LOW | LOW | RUNNER-UP |
| Hines | IN | WIN | WIN | WIN | OUT | |
| Kathy | LOW | WIN | WIN | IN | OUT | |
| Johnny | WIN | IN | IN | OUT | | |
| Chilli | WIN | IN | OUT | | | |
| Cornelia | WIN | OUT | | | | |
| Gilbert | OUT | | | | | |

(WINNER) The celebrity won the series.
(RUNNER-UP) The celebrity was the runner-up of the series.
(WIN) The celebrity won the task.
(IN) The celebrity lost the task but was not in the bottom two.
(LOW) The celebrity competed in and won the cook-off to advance to the next round.
(OUT) The celebrity lost that week's cook-off and was eliminated from the competition.

=== Episodes ===
==== Episode One: The Show Must Go On ====
Teams are chosen, and the teams' first challenge is to prepare a tasting menu. Each team must produce four individual dishes plus one team dessert, and put on a skit.

- Team Rachael Captain: Kathy Najimy
- Team Guy Captain: Dean McDermott
- Winning team: Team Guy
- Bottom 2 Cook-Off Participants: Kathy Najimy and Gilbert Gottfried
- Elimination Cook-Off Assignment: Ideal midnight snack
- Advanced: Kathy Najimy
- Eliminated: Gilbert Gottfried

==== Episode Two: Hollywood Walk of Farm ====
The two teams visit a farm to learn about fresh cooking. For their challenge, each team member must create a dish with a specific meat product, such as salmon or lamb chops, along with a side dish that includes vegetables that they must pick on their own as a team.

- Team Rachael Captain: Carnie Wilson
- Team Guy Captain: Cornelia Guest
- Winning team: Team Rachael
- Bottom 2 Cook-Off Participants: Cornelia Guest and Dean McDermott
- Elimination Cook-Off Assignment: Corn
- Advanced: Dean McDermott
- Eliminated: Cornelia Guest

==== Episode Three: Bright Lights, Big Classics ====
The teams run their own diners with the help of wait staff. Each team member is responsible for one of three diner classics: the tuna melt, the cheeseburger, or the club sandwich. One member must also entertain the crowd.

- Team Rachael Captain: Hines Ward
- Team Guy Captain: Johnny Weir
- Winning team: Team Rachael
- Bottom 2 Cook-Off Participants: Chilli and Dean McDermott
- Elimination Cook-Off Assignment: Milkshake
- Advanced: Dean McDermott
- Eliminated: Chilli

==== Episode Four: Picky Palates ====
The remaining five have to create a child's birthday party menu

- Winning team: Tie
- Bottom 2 Cook-Off Participants: Johnny Weir and Carnie Wilson
- Elimination Cook-Off Assignment: Hot dogs
- Advanced: Carnie Wilson
- Eliminated: Johnny Weir

==== Episode Five: Lights, Camera, Lunch Trucks ====
The remaining four are asked to run food trucks and are judged individually.

- Winning cook: Dean McDermott
- Bottom 3 Cook-Off Participants: Carnie Wilson, Hines Ward, and Kathy Najimy
- Elimination Cook-Off Assignment: Anything on a stick
- Advanced: Carnie Wilson
- Eliminated: Hines Ward and Kathy Najimy

==== Episode Six: Star Studded Supper ====
- Winning team: Team Guy
- Winner: Dean McDermott
- Runner-Up: Carnie Wilson

== Season Three ==
=== Participating celebrities ===
| Celebrity | Occupation | Team | Charity | Status |
|---|---|---|---|---|
| Chris Kattan | Saturday Night Live Comedian & Actor | Guy | The Chrysalis Foundation | Eliminated 1st on January 13, 2014 |
| Jake Pavelka | Reality Television Star The Bachelor | Rachael | Tag the World | Eliminated 2nd on January 20, 2014 |
| Judy Gold | Comedian | Rachael | Project ALS | Eliminated 3rd on January 27, 2014 |
| Vanilla Ice | Rapper & Television Host | Guy | Make-A-Wish Foundation | Eliminated 4th on February 3, 2014 |
| Florence Henderson | Actress & Singer | Rachael | City of Hope | Finalist on February 10, 2014 |
| Tiffany | Platinum Recording Artist | Guy | The Caring Place | Finalist on February 10, 2014 |
| Penn Jillette | Magician, Illusionist, & Entrepreneur | Rachael | Opportunity Village | Runner-up on February 10, 2014 |
| Herschel Walker | Former NFL Player & Heisman Trophy Winner | Guy | Patriot Support | Winner on February 10, 2014 |

=== Celebrity progress ===
| Contestant | Episode | | | | | |
| Contestant | 1 | 2 | 3 | 4 | 5 | 6 |
|---|---|---|---|---|---|---|
| Herschel | WIN | IN | MVP | MVP | IN | WINNER |
| Penn | IN | WIN | MVP | MVP | WIN | RUNNER-UP |
| Tiffany | MVP | IN | WIN | WIN | IN | OUT |
| Florence | IN | MVP | IN | IN | MVP | OUT |
| Vanilla Ice | WIN | IN | WIN | WIN | OUT | |
| Judy | IN | WIN | IN | OUT | | |
| Jake | IN | WIN | OUT | | | |
| Chris | WIN | OUT | | | | |

(WIN) The celebrity won the series.
(RUNNER-UP) The celebrity was the runner-up of the series.
(WIN) The celebrity won the task.
(IN) The celebrity lost the task but was not eliminated.
(MVP) The celebrity was their team's MVP.
(OUT) The celebrity was eliminated.

=== Episodes ===
==== Episode One: Chefs of the Roundtable ====
Teams are chosen, and the teams' first challenge is to prepare a medieval themed meal.

Guest Judge: Lee Anne Wong
Winning Team: Team Guy
MVP: Tiffany
Eliminated: No One

==== Episode Two: Leis in the Fray ====
The teams must prepare a meal for a luau.

Guest Judge: Marc Murphy
Winning Team: Team Rachael
MVP: Florence Henderson
Eliminated: Chris Kattan

==== Episode Three: Supermarket Smackdown ====
Guest Judge: Madison Cowan
Winning Team:Team Guy
MVP: Penn Jillette and Herschel Walker
Eliminated: Jake Pavelka

==== Episode Four: Big Game Grub ====
The episode is set in a sports center. In the first challenge, the celebrities must make chicken wings (vegetarian Vanilla Ice was allowed to instead make a similar game day food out of tofu). Based on that, each team's MVP gets chosen who also gains immunity from elimination. In the next challenge, they have to cook elevated stadium food.

Guest Judge: Alex Guarnaschelli and Josh Elliott
Winning Team: Team Guy
MVP: Penn Jillette and Herschel Walker
Eliminated: Judy Gold

==== Episode Five: Boardwalk Bites ====
First, in a mini-challenge to win a 10-minute advantage in the main challenge, the celebrities must make French fries. In the main challenge they must make hot dogs.

Guest Judge: Amanda Freitag
Winning Team: Team Rachael
MVP: Florence Henderson
Eliminated: Vanilla Ice

The finalists therefore are Herschel Walker, Tiffany, Penn Jillette and Florence Henderson.

==== Episode Six: Sink or Swim ====
Aboard a ship, the finalists have to cook three-course dinners with Vanilla Ice and Judy Gold assisting them. They have to give five-minute presentations.

Judges: Aaron Sanchez, Scott Conant, Sunny Anderson, and some restaurateurs.
Winning Celebrity: Herschel Walker

Penn was the runner-up and was given $5,000 for his charity from Rachael and Guy's own money.
