= Milian =

Milian is a Spanish (Milián) and Polish surname: from a reduced form of the Latin personal name Aemilianus (a derivative of Aemilius, a Roman family name probably derived from aemulus ‘rival’). This was borne by various early saints and hence was widely used throughout Europe as a personal name in the Middle Ages.

Milian or Milián is a surname. Notable people with the surname include:

- Agustín Milián (born 1958), Spanish handball player
- Christina Milian (born 1981), American R&B and pop singer-songwriter, record producer, dancer, and actress
  - Christina Milian (album), released October 9, 2001
  - Christina Milian discography
- Jerzy Milian (1935–2018), Polish jazz musician, painter, composer and vibraphonist from the city of Poznań
- Juan Milián (born 1981), Spanish politician
- Marilyn Milian (born 1961), former Florida state circuit court judge, formerly on American TV program The People's Court
- Ted Milian (born 1954), Canadian football player
- Tomas Milian (1932–2017), Cuban-American actor
