= Joe Burns (cricketer) =

Italian cricketer (born 1989)

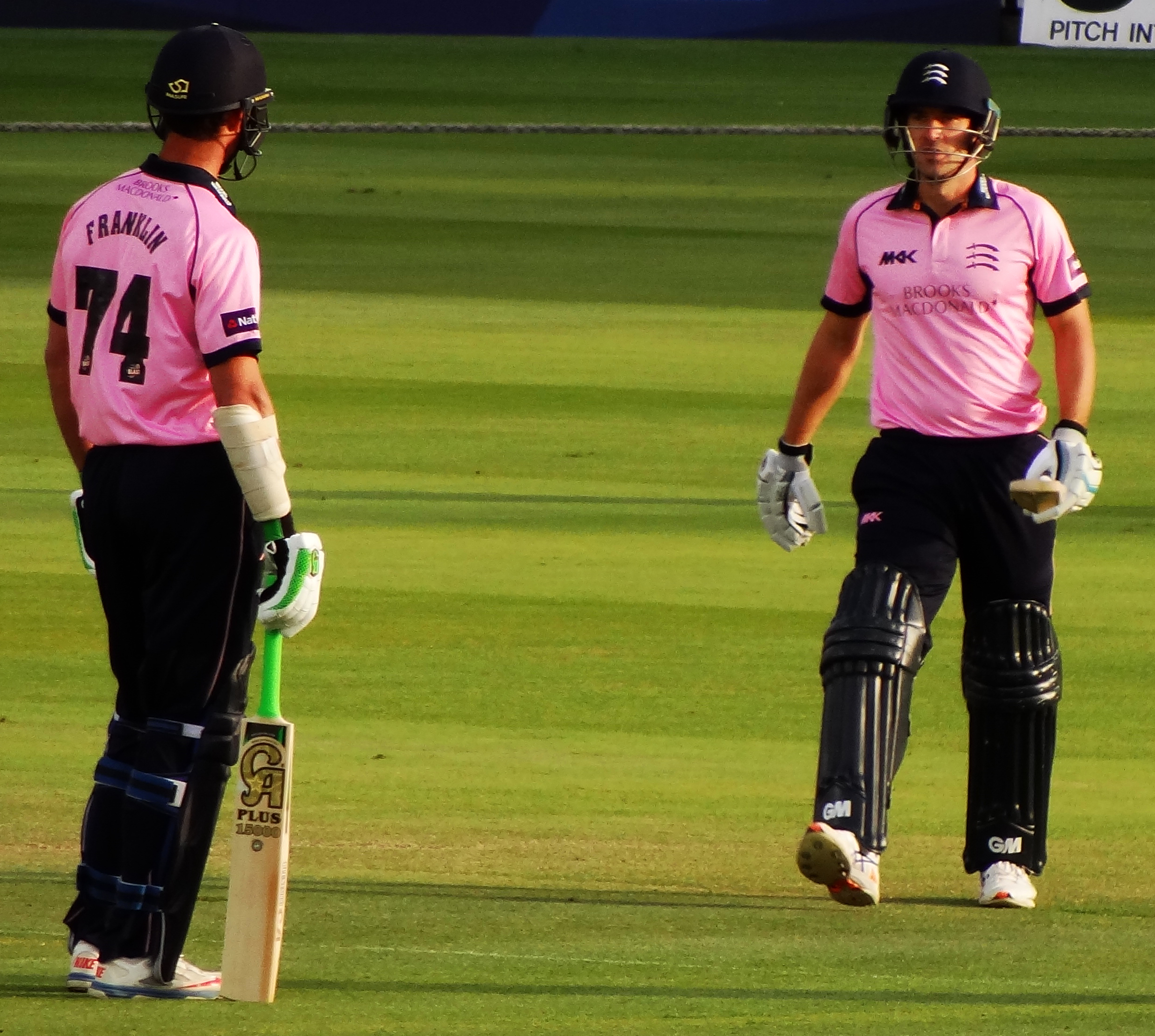
- James Franklin and Burns (right) in 2015

Personal information
- Full name: Joseph Anthony Burns
- Born: 6 September 1989 (age 37); Herston, Queensland, Australia
- Height: 182 cm (6 ft 0 in)
- Batting: Right-handed
- Bowling: Right-arm medium
- Role: Batter
- Relatives: Harold Burns (Great uncle)

International information
- National sides: Australia (2014–2020); Italy (2024–present)
- Test debut (cap 441): 26 December 2014; Australia v India
- Last Test: 26 December 2020; Australia v India
- ODI debut (cap 207): 27 August 2015; Australia v Ireland
- Last ODI: 13 September 2015; Australia v England
- T20I debut (cap 43): 9 June 2024; Italy v Luxembourg
- Last T20I: 11 July 2025; Italy v Netherlands

Domestic team information
- Years: Team
- 2010/11–2023/24: Queensland
- 2012/13–2020/21: Brisbane Heat
- 2013: Leicestershire
- 2015: Middlesex
- 2018: Glamorgan
- 2019: Lancashire
- 2021/22–2023/24: Melbourne Stars

Career statistics
Competition	Test	ODI	FC	LA
Matches	23	6	160	89
Runs scored	1,442	146	9,809	2,702
Batting average	36.97	24.33	37.58	34.64
100s/50s	4/7	0/1	20/54	3/16
Top score	180	69	202*	154
Balls bowled	–	–	132	78
Wickets	–	–	1	2
Bowling average	–	–	50.00	33.50
5 wickets in innings	–	–	0	0
10 wickets in match	–	–	0	0
Best bowling	–	–	1/0	1/7
Catches/stumpings	23/–	2/–	173/–	38/–
- Source: ESPNcricinfo, 9 March 2025

Joseph Anthony Burns (born 6 September 1989) is an Australian-Italian cricketer. He previously played for the Australia national cricket team, Melbourne Stars in the Big Bash League and Queensland in Australian domestic cricket. In May 2024, he announced his move to Italy as a tribute for his late brother Dominic, who died in February 2024 and in the hopes of playing for Italy in the 2026 T20 World Cup. Under his leadership, the Italy national cricket team qualified for the 2026 T20 World Cup for the first time. However, in the lead up to the tournament, he was dropped from the squad and replaced by Wayne Madsen as captain.

== Early life ==
Burns' parents were both school teachers. He was a good cricketer as a child, though not a prodigy. "I finished uni, thinking I was going to get a job in business," he said. "I didn't play cricket with the ambition of playing professionally … but you make a few runs, go up the grades, and it all happened so quickly from there." Burns grew up in Brisbane's northern suburbs and attended Nudgee College.

== Domestic and T20 career ==
Burns made an exceptional start in his Sheffield Shield debut against South Australia, scoring 140 in February 2011.

In the 2011–12 Sheffield Shield season, Burns was the fifth highest run scorer in the Australian first-class cricket season, scoring 781 runs. This was followed by 587 runs in the 2012–13 Sheffield Shield season.

Burns performances resulted in a call in early 2013 up to the Australia A to face the touring party from England, where he scored 114 in a one-day game, not long after being named the Bradman Young Cricketer of the Year.

Burns continued his good form on his return to Australia and was top scorer for the Brisbane Heat in their win over Perth Scorchers in the final of the 2012–13 Big Bash League season.

Burns performances brought him to the attention of Leicestershire who signed him as a replacement for their overseas player, Ramnaresh Sarwan, between May and August of the 2013 County season. This was curtailed in July, when a hip injury forced Burns to end his spell in England and return home to Queensland.

Burns deputised for the Middlesex captain Adam Voges during the 2015 English season.

In December 2017, Burns scored his maiden first-class double century, batting for Queensland against South Australia in the 2017–18 Sheffield Shield season. In March 2018, Cricket Australia named Burns in their Sheffield Shield team of the year. In 2019, he signed with Lancashire ahead of the 2019 County Championship in England, but returned to Australia for personal reasons after making only one appearance.

In April 2021, Burns was signed by Lahore Qalandars to play in the rescheduled matches in the 2021 Pakistan Super League.

== International career ==
In December 2014, Burns was selected to play for Australia in the Boxing Day Test against India at the Melbourne Cricket Ground following an injury to all rounder Mitchell Marsh. He batted at number 6 and scored 13 runs before being caught behind off Umesh Yadav.

Burns then managed to score two half centuries (58 and 66) in his second Test at the Sydney Cricket Ground.

In November 2015, Burns made his first Test century against New Zealand at the Gabba, bringing up his century with two consecutive sixes off the bowling of off-spinner Mark Craig.

Burns made his One Day International debut for Australia against Ireland on 27 August 2015 in Stormont, Belfast, Northern Ireland. In his ODI debut, he scored a half century.

Home and away Test series against the West Indies and New Zealand in 2015–16 produced Burns two more centuries, but lean scores followed in Sri Lanka in the latter half of 2016 which resulted in Burns being dropped after the Hobart Test against South Africa in November 2016.

=== Recalls ===
On 28 March 2018, Burns was urgently recalled to the Test team following the suspensions of Steve Smith, David Warner and Cameron Bancroft for ball tampering during the third Test of the Australian 2018 Tour of South Africa.

In February 2019, Burns was again recalled to the Test squad for the two match series against Sri Lanka, and opened the batting in both matches. In the first match, across both Sri Lanka innings, Burns fielded at slips and took three catches. In the second match, in Canberra, Burns scored his fourth Test century, hitting 180 in the first innings.

In June 2019, Burns was diagnosed with a fatigue disorder, dating back to a viral infection that he suffered in October 2018. He recovered, and was recalled in the home Test series against Pakistan in November 2019, scoring 97 in Australia's only innings.

Burns went on to play the subsequent three Test home series against New Zealand in December 2019 and January 2020, scoring a half century in the first Test at Perth. In April 2020, Cricket Australia awarded Burns with a central contract ahead of the 2020–21 season.

=== Move to Italy ===
In May 2024, Burns confirmed that he will be representing Italy as a tribute for his late brother. He is eligible to represent Italy through his mother's nationality, and will now be a part of their squad for the sub regional qualifiers. He also revealed that he will be wearing the number 85 on his jersey to honor his brother as 85 was the number in the last team played.

Burns debuted for Italy on June 8, against Luxembourg as part of Italy's 2026 ICC Men's T20 World Cup qualification process.

In the Regional Qualifier A finals, Burns scored a century (108 not out) off 55 balls against Romania. Italy subsequently qualified for the Regional Finals.

Test centuries scored by Joe Burns
No.	Score	Against	Venue	Date	Result
1	129	New Zealand	The Gabba, Brisbane	5 November 2015	Australia won
2	128	West Indies	Melbourne Cricket Ground, Melbourne	26 December 2015	Australia won
3	170	New Zealand	Hagley Oval, Christchurch	20 February 2016	Australia won
4	180	Sri Lanka	Manuka Oval, Canberra	1 February 2019	Australia won

International T20 centuries scored by Joe Burns
No.	Score	Against	Venue	Date	Result
1	108*	Romania	Rome	16 June 2024	Italy won
