= Alex Bevilaqua =

Australian cricketer (born 1996)

Alex Bevilaqua (Bevs)
Personal information
- Full name: Alex Attey Bevilaqua
- Born: 29 October 1996 (age 30); Subiaco, Western Australia
- Height: 2.07 m (6 ft 9 in)
- Batting: Right-handed
- Bowling: Right-arm fast-medium
- Role: Bowler

Domestic team information
- Years: Team
- 2017/18–2018/19 2023: Western Australia Bovey Tracey CC (loan)

Career statistics
Competition	First-class
Matches	2
Runs scored	57
Batting average	19.00
100s/50s	0/0
Top score	36
Balls bowled	192
Wickets	2
Bowling average	46.00
5 wickets in innings	0
10 wickets in match	0
Best bowling	1/21
Catches/stumpings	2/–
- Source: Cricinfo, 5 October 2021

Alex Bevilaqua (Bevs) (born 29 October 1996) is an Australian cricketer. He made his first-class debut for Western Australia in the 2017–18 Sheffield Shield season on 8 February 2018. In May 2019, he was signed by Tasmania ahead of the 2019–20 season.
