= Liam Guthrie =

Australian cricketer (born 1997)

Personal information
- Full name: Liam Christopher James Guthrie
- Born: 9 April 1997 (age 29); Subiaco, Western Australia, Australia
- Batting: Left-handed
- Bowling: Left-arm fast-medium
- Role: Bowler

Domestic team information
- Years: Team
- 2017/18–2021/22: Western Australia
- 2021/22: Brisbane Heat
- 2022/23–2024/25: Queensland
- 2025–2026: Northamptonshire
- FC debut: 16 February 2018 Western Australia v Tasmania
- Last FC: 19 October 2020 Western Australia v NSW

Career statistics
Competition	FC	LA	T20
Matches	35	30	7
Runs scored	455	131	17
Batting average	12.29	9.35	8.50
100s/50s	0/2	0/0	0/0
Top score	52	21	11*
Balls bowled	5,599	1,345	150
Wickets	104	42	6
Bowling average	36.10	31.57	45.33
5 wickets in innings	2	0	0
10 wickets in match	0	0	0
Best bowling	7/94	4/15	2/32
Catches/stumpings	15/—	13/–	3/–
- Source: ESPNCricinfo, 27 September 2026

Liam Christopher James Guthrie (born 9 April 1997) is an Australian cricketer. He plays first-class cricket and List A cricket for Western Australia and for Hobart Hurricanes in the Big Bash League.

== Career ==
He made his first-class debut for Western Australia against Tasmania on 16 February 2018 as part of the 2017–18 Sheffield Shield season. He made his List A debut on 2 March 2021, for Western Australia in the 2020–21 Marsh One-Day Cup. He made his Twenty20 debut on 6 December 2021, for the Brisbane Heat in the 2021–22 Big Bash League season. He has recently been signed to the Hobart Hurricanes, for the 2023-24 season.

Guthrie joined Northamptonshire County Cricket Club on a three-year contract in March 2025.
