= Eamonn Vines =

Australian cricketer (born 1994)

Personal information
- Full name: Eamonn M Vines
- Born: 17 January 1994 (age 32)
- Batting: Left-handed

Domestic team information
- Years: Team
- 2018–2020: Victoria (squad no. 22)

Career statistics
Competition	First-class
Matches	6
Runs scored	163
Batting average	16.30
100s/50s	0/0
Top score	38
Catches/stumpings	5/0
- Source: Cricinfo, 28 November 2019

Eamonn Vines (born 17 January 1994) is an Australian cricketer. He made his first-class debut on 8 February 2018 for Victoria against South Australia at the Adelaide Oval during the 2017–18 Sheffield Shield season. In 2021 Eamonn Vines moved to Tasmania, where he made his Tasmanian debut on 18 February 2022 against New South Wales at the SCG.
