= Harold Burns (cricketer) =

Australian cricketer

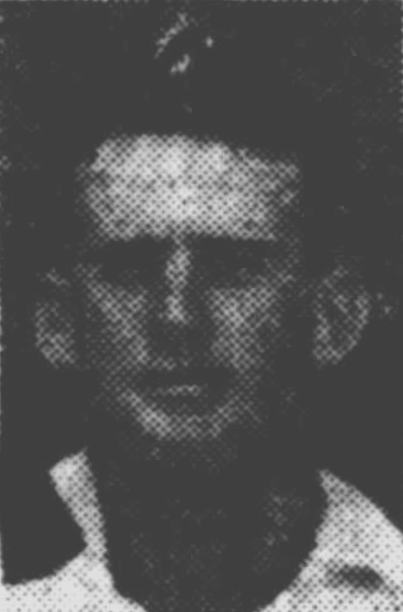

Personal information
- Full name: Harold Vincent Burns
- Born: 20 May 1908; Ebagoolah, Queensland
- Died: 4 June 1944 (aged 36); Cairns, Queensland
- Batting: Right-handed
- Role: Wicket-keeper
- Relatives: Joe Burns (Great-nephew)

Domestic team information
- Years: Team
- 1930/31–1931/32: Queensland
- Source: CricInfo, 23 April 2016

Harold Vincent Burns (20 May 1908 – 4 June 1944) was an Australian first-class cricketer who played for the Queensland cricket team from 1930/31 until 1931/32. He is the great-uncle of Joe Burns, who plays cricket for the Queensland cricket team and the Australia national cricket team.
