= Conor McInerney =

Australian cricketer (born 1994)

Personal information
- Full name: Conor James Walker McInerney
- Born: 30 March 1994 (age 32); Woodville South, South Australia
- Batting: Left-handed
- Bowling: Slow left-arm orthodox
- Role: Opening batter

Domestic team information
- Years: Team
- 2017/18–2020/21, 2023/24–2025/26: South Australia (squad no. 37)

Career statistics
Competition	FC	LA
Matches	30	1
Runs scored	1,331	24
Batting average	22.94	24.00
100s/50s	1/7	0/0
Top score	142	24
Balls bowled	137	–
Wickets	1	–
Bowling average	95.00	–
5 wickets in innings	0	–
10 wickets in match	0	–
Best bowling	1/33	–
Catches/stumpings	34/–	0/–
- Source: Cricinfo, 23 March 2026

Conor James Walker McInerney (born 30 March 1994) is an Australian cricketer. He made his first-class debut for South Australia in the 2017–18 Sheffield Shield season on 5 March 2018. He made his List A debut for South Australia in the 2018–19 JLT One-Day Cup on 3 October 2018.

McInerney made his first class debut in the 2017-18 Sheffield Shield. In April 2021, McInerney was one of five players to be dropped by the South Australia cricket team, following a season without any wins.

Ahead of the 2023-24 season, McInerney was added back onto South Australia's contract list. However, he was once again delisted at the end of the 2025-26 season.
