= Andrew Holder =

Australian cricketer

Personal information
- Full name: Andrew Brian Holder
- Batting: Right-handed
- Bowling: Right-arm fast-medium
- Role: Bowler

Domestic team information
- Years: Team
- 2017/18: Western Australia
- First-class debut: 13 November 2017 Western Australia v South Australia

Career statistics
Competition	First-class
Matches	3
Runs scored	48
Batting average	16.00
100s/50s	0/0
Top score	20*
Balls bowled	461
Wickets	8
Bowling average	34.00
5 wickets in innings	0
10 wickets in match	0
Best bowling	3/45
Catches/stumpings	0/–
- Source: Cricinfo, 5 October 2021

Andrew Holder is an Australian businessman and cricketer. He has represented Western Australia three times in the Sheffield Shield. In 2012, he founded Revo Fitness, which became a national chain of gyms.

He made his first-class cricket debut for Western Australia on 13 November 2017 in the 2017-18 Sheffield Shield season.

Holder founded Revo Fitness with a single gym in Shenton Park.
