= Luke Feldman =

Australian cricketer (born 1984)

Personal information
- Full name: Luke William Feldman
- Born: 1 August 1984 (age 42); Sunnybank, Queensland, Australia
- Batting: Right-handed
- Bowling: Right-arm fast-medium
- Role: Bowler

Domestic team information
- Years: Team
- 2009/10–2018/19: Queensland
- 2012/13: Sydney Sixers
- 2013/14: Sydney Thunder
- 2013/14: Northern Districts
- 2015/16: Brisbane Heat
- 2016/17: Central Districts

Career statistics
Competition	FC	LA	T20
Matches	63	33	23
Runs scored	741	158	25
Batting average	16.46	17.55	12.50
100s/50s	0/1	0/0	0/0
Top score	52	33	12*
Balls bowled	11,902	1,516	476
Wickets	232	36	21
Bowling average	25.94	35.55	29.71
5 wickets in innings	8	1	0
10 wickets in match	0	0	0
Best bowling	6/32	5/57	29.71
Catches/stumpings	24/–	5/–	7/–
- Source: ESPNcricinfo, 15 May 2019

Luke Feldman (born 1 August 1984) is a former Australian cricketer who played for the Queensland Bulls. He is the son of former Queensland One Nation party leader Bill Feldman.

Feldman was a policeman in the North Queensland country towns of Charters Towers and Innisfail and drove to play club cricket in Townsville and Cairns comps before returning to fulfil his duties as a policeman after the game. After some strong performances he was offered a place in the Queensland Academy.

He made his Sheffield Shield debut against the Victorian Bushrangers at the Melbourne Cricket Ground. During the match, he made a mid-night arrest after an intruder came into his hotel room. By that stage he'd already bowled Nick Jewell and was soon wreaking more havoc on the Victorian team. Since then he has improved by gaining match figures of 9 for 81 against the New South Wales Blues.

Feldman played a key role in a rare "tied" draw between Queensland and Victoria in the 2011–12 Sheffield Shield season. Batting at number 11 and needing two runs to win off the last ball of the match, Feldman scored a single. He did not attempt a second run; had he done so and succeeded, Queensland would have won the match; had he done so and failed, the match would have been a tie as opposed to a draw, and both teams would have earned three points for the match as opposed to two.

In March 2018, during the 2017–18 Sheffield Shield season, he took his 200th first-class wicket.

In March 2019, Feldman announced his retirement from professional cricket, rededicating his life to the Queensland Police Force. He retired after 63 first-class matches and 232 wickets.
