= Juan Milián =

Spanish politician (born 1981)

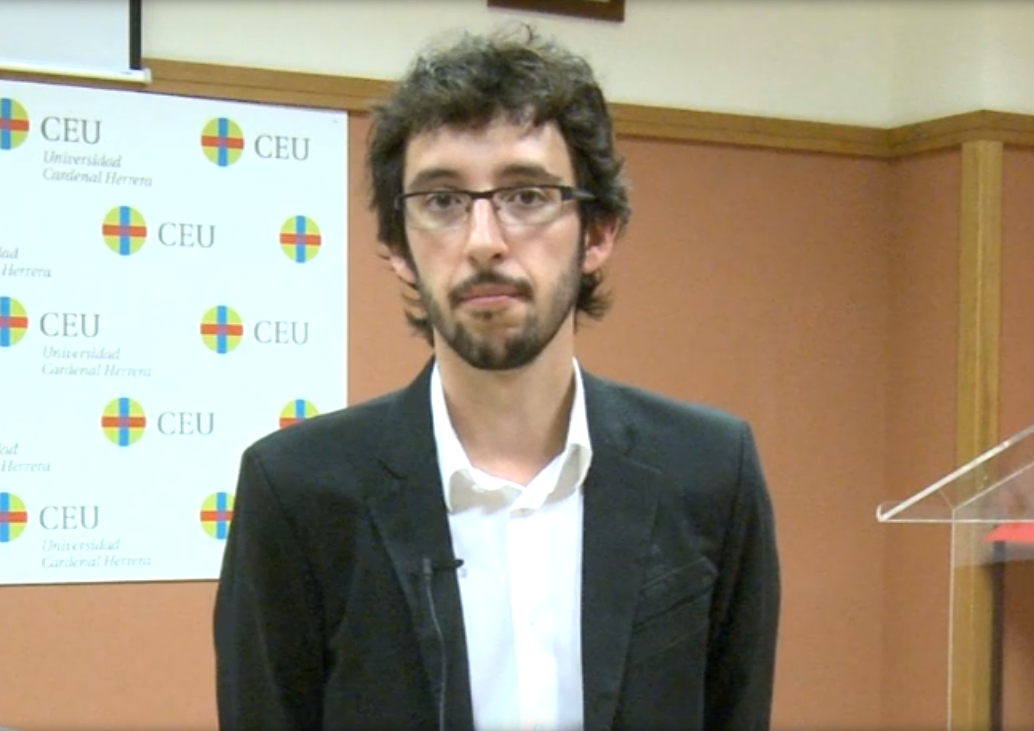
- Milián in 2013

Member of the Senate
- Incumbent
- Assumed office 8 October 2025
- Appointed by: Parliament of Catalonia

Personal details
- Born: 27 August 1981 (age 44)
- Party: People's Party

Juan Bautista Milián Querol (born 27 August 1981) is a Spanish politician serving as a member of the Senate since 2025. From 2011 to 2017, he was a member of the Parliament of Catalonia.
