= Jake Hancock (cricketer) =

Australian cricketer (born 1991)

Personal information
- Born: 28 November 1991 (age 34)
- Batting: Right-handed

Career statistics
Competition	First-class
Matches	5
Runs scored	75
Batting average	8.33
100s/50s	0/0
Top score	28
Catches/stumpings	3/–
- Source: ESPNcricinfo, 5 October 2021

Jake Hancock (born 28 November 1991) is an Australian cricketer. He made his first-class debut for Tasmania in the 2016–17 Sheffield Shield season on 5 December 2016.
