= Johnathan Dalton =

Australian cricketer (born 1996)

Personal information
- Full name: Johnathan David Dalton
- Born: 9 June 1996 (age 30)
- Batting: Right-handed
- Bowling: Right-arm medium
- Role: Opening batsman

Domestic team information
- Years: Team
- 2016/17–present: South Australia
- First-class debut: 16 March 2017 South Australia v Tasmania

Career statistics
| Competition | First-class |
|---|---|
| Matches | 10 |
| Runs scored | 455 |
| Batting average | 22.75 |
| 100s/50s | 0/3 |
| Top score | 71 |
| Balls bowled | 72 |
| Wickets | 0 |
| Bowling average | – |
| 5 wickets in innings | – |
| 10 wickets in match | – |
| Best bowling | – |
| Catches/stumpings | 4/– |
- Source: ESPNcricinfo, 28 February 2018

Johnathan Dalton (born 9 June 1996) is an Australian cricketer. He made his first-class debut for South Australia in the 2016–17 Sheffield Shield season on 16 March 2017.

== Domestic career ==
=== 2015–16 season ===
Dalton played for South Australia Under-23s in three matches in the 2015–16 Futures League, scoring 192 runs at an average of 32.00. His high score of 92 came against Victoria Under-23s in the final match of the tournament.

=== 2016–17 season ===
He continued for South Australia in the Futures League in the 2016–17 season and his form improved, averaging 45.50. He scored twin centuries, 104 and 100 not out, against Victoria. He got the opportunity to play against the touring South African side in a tour match for a South Australia second XI. He scored 20 runs before he was run-out.

His form was good enough to be rewarded with his first-class debut at the end of the season. He played in a Sheffield Shield match against Tasmania. He opened the batting, scoring 40 runs in the first innings and 71 in the second. As South Australia won the match, they progressed to the final against Victoria, which Dalton also played in. He again opened the batting, but this time he was bowled by James Pattinson on the third ball of South Australia's first innings.

=== 2017–18 season ===
Dalton earned his first contract with South Australia ahead of the 2017–18 season.
