= Simon Mackin =

Australian cricketer

Personal information
- Full name: Simon Patrick Mackin
- Born: 1 September 1992 (age 34); Wyalkatchem, Western Australia
- Height: 2.02 m (6 ft 8 in)
- Batting: Right-handed
- Bowling: Right-arm fast-medium
- Role: Bowler

Domestic team information
- Years: Team
- 2013/14–2019/20: Western Australia (squad no. 33)
- 2020/21: Victoria
- FC debut: 8 December 2013 WA v Tasmania
- LA debut: 20 July 2014 National Performance Squad v South Africa A

Career statistics
Competition	FC	LA
Matches	32	10
Runs scored	105	2
Batting average	5.00	–
100s/50s	0/0	0/0
Top score	15*	1*
Balls bowled	5,796	534
Wickets	101	14
Bowling average	30.39	31.92
5 wickets in innings	5	1
10 wickets in match	2	0
Best bowling	7/81	5/33
Catches/stumpings	16/–	2/–
- Source: ESPNcricinfo, 7 January 2021

Simon Patrick Mackin (born 1 September 1992) is an Australian cricketer who debuted for Western Australia during the 2013–14 season.

Mackin was born in Wyalkatchem, a small country town in the Wheatbelt region of Western Australia, and raised nearby in Tammin. A right-arm fast bowler who stands 2.02 metres (6 ft 8 in) tall, he made his debut for the state under-23 side in 2010, aged 18, after previous appearances for state under-15, under-17, and under-19 teams. At the conclusion of the 2012–13 season, following good form for Willetton at grade level, Mackin was named the WA Cricket Media Guild's Player of the Future. He subsequently received a rookie contract from the Western Australian Cricket Association (WACA) for the 2013–14 season.

In November 2013, Mackin played a match for a Cricket Australia Chairman's XI against the touring English team at Traeger Park, Alice Springs, after two other bowlers (Alister McDermott and Kane Richardson) withdrew. He made his first-class debut shortly after, taking two wickets in a Sheffield Shield game against Queensland. Mackin's height and bowling ability have led to him being compared to Jo Angel, who holds the record for the most first-class wickets taken for Western Australia.

After taking 39 wickets in his first 13 first-class matches, he then took 23 in his next two, in the Sheffield Shield in 2016-17: 5 for 68 and 6 for 33 against Queensland, and 7 for 81 and 5 for 78 against South Australia. Western Australia won both matches.
