= Andrew Perrin =

Australian cricketer (born 1990)

Personal information
- Full name: Andrew Barry Perrin
- Born: 23 June 1990 (age 36)
- Batting: Right-handed
- Bowling: Right-arm fast-medium
- Role: Bowler

Domestic team information
- Years: Team
- 2016/17: Tasmania

Career statistics
Competition	First-class
Matches	3
Runs scored	6
Batting average	2.00
100s/50s	0/0
Top score	2*
Balls bowled	186
Wickets	10
Bowling average	23.70
5 wickets in innings	0
10 wickets in match	0
Best bowling	3/84
Catches/stumpings	1/–
- Source: Cricinfo, 4 February 2017

Andrew Perrin (born 23 June 1990) is an Australian cricketer. Perrin moved to Tasmania from Victoria in 2016 in order to increase his chances of playing interstate cricket. He made his first-class debut for Tasmania in the 2016–17 Sheffield Shield season on 1 February 2017. After three first class matches, Perrin represented the Tasmanian U23 side in the four-day Futures League for the remainder of the 2017–18 season. In February 2020, Perrin represented the Victorian Second XI in a four-day match against the Australian Capital Territory in the Cricket Australia Second XI competition.
