= 2016–17 Hobart Hurricanes season =

Hobart Hurricanes
2016–17 season
- Coach: Damien Wright
- Captain(s): Tim Paine
- Home ground: Blundstone Arena
- Big Bash League: 7th
- BBL Finals: –
- Highest home attendance: 18,079 (Round 2 vs. Melbourne Stars)

The 2016–17 Hobart Hurricanes' season was the team's sixth season in the Big Bash League (BBL).

== League table ==
Pos	Team	Pld	W	L	NR	Pts	NRR	Qualification
1	Perth Scorchers (C)	8	5	3	0	10	0.618	Advanced to semi-finals
2	Brisbane Heat	8	5	3	0	10	0.516	Advanced to semi-finals
3	Sydney Sixers	8	5	3	0	10	−0.848	Advanced to semi-finals
4	Melbourne Stars	8	4	4	0	8	0.397	Advanced to semi-finals
5	Melbourne Renegades	8	4	4	0	8	0.042	
6	Adelaide Strikers	8	3	5	0	6	0.334	
7	Hobart Hurricanes	8	3	5	0	6	−0.530	
8	Sydney Thunder	8	3	5	0	6	−0.600	

(C) Champions

== Matches ==
23 December
18:10 (D/N)
Scorecard

Hobart Hurricanes; 6/200 (20 overs)	v	Sydney Sixers (H); 140 (16.2 overs)
Tim Paine 63 (45); Sean Abbott 2/41 (4 overs)		Sam Billings 42 (33); Shaun Tait 3/32 (3.2 overs)

Hobart Hurricanes won by 60 runs
Sydney Cricket Ground
Attendance: 21,002
Umpires: Phillip Gillespie and Paul Wilson
Player of the match: D'Arcy Short (Hurricanes)

- Sydney Sixers won the toss and elected to field.
- D'Arcy Short (Hurricanes) made his T20 debut.

26 December
19:10 (D/N)
Scorecard

(H) Hobart Hurricanes; 4/188 (20 overs)	v	Melbourne Stars; 3/191 (17.4 overs)
Tim Paine 91 (61); Ben Hilfenhaus 3/38 (4 overs)		Rob Quiney 75 (43); Stuart Broad 2/35 (3.4 overs)

Melbourne Stars won by 7 wickets
Blundstone Arena
Attendance: 18,079
Umpires: Geoff Joshua and Paul Wilson
Player of the match: Rob Quiney (Stars)

- Hobart Hurricanes won the toss and elected to bat.
- Sam Harper (Stars) made his T20 debut.

30 December
18:10 (D/N)
Scorecard

Hobart Hurricanes; 9/173 (20 overs)	v	Brisbane Heat (H); 3/174 (16.2 overs)
Daniel Christian 33 (23); Jack Wildermuth 2/26 (3 overs)		Chris Lynn 85* (50); Stuart Broad 1/24 (3 overs)

Brisbane Heat won by 7 wickets
The Gabba
Attendance: 34,601
Umpires: John Ward and Paul Wilson
Player of the match: Chris Lynn (Heat)

- Brisbane Heat won the toss and elected to field.
- The crowd of 34,601 set a new record for the highest for a BBL match on the ground

2 January
19:10 (D/N)
Scorecard

Adelaide Strikers; 143 (20 overs)	v	Hobart Hurricanes (H); 2/144 (17.4 overs)
Brad Hodge 55 (45); Daniel Christian 5/14 (4 overs)		D'Arcy Short 60 (39); Billy Stanlake 1/17 (4 overs)

Hobart Hurricanes won by 8 wickets
Blundstone Arena
Attendance: 16,815
Umpires: Phillip Gillespie and John Ward
Player of the match: Daniel Christian (Hurricanes)

- Hobart Hurricanes won the toss and elected to field.
- Beau Webster (Hurricanes) made his T20 debut.

6 January
18:40 (D/N)
Scorecard

Hobart Hurricanes; 8/161 (20 overs)	v	Adelaide Strikers (H); 5/164 (18.2 overs)
Beau Webster 67* (43); Chris Jordan 3/24 (4 overs)		Ben Dunk 79* (49); Daniel Christian 2/24 (4 overs)

Adelaide Strikers won by 5 wickets
Adelaide Oval
Attendance: 39,229
Umpires: Simon Fry and Michael Graham-Smith
Player of the match: Ben Dunk (Strikers)

- Adelaide Strikers won the toss and elected to field.

8 January
19:10 (D/N)
Scorecard

(H) Hobart Hurricanes; 8/161 (20 overs)	v	Sydney Thunder; 4/162 (16.5 overs)
George Bailey 69* (54); Carlos Brathwaite 2/31 (3 overs)		Shane Watson 55 (31); Cameron Boyce 2/28 (3.5 overs)

Sydney Thunder won by 6 wickets
Blundstone Arena
Attendance: 17,939
Umpires: Greg Davidson and Mick Martell
Player of the match: Shane Watson (Thunder)

- Sydney Thunder won the toss and elected to field.

12 January
18:40 (D/N)
Scorecard

(H) Melbourne Renegades; 4/222 (20 overs)	v	Hobart Hurricanes; 8/223 (20 overs)
Aaron Finch 63 (40); Jake Reed 2/54 (4 overs)		Ben McDermott 114 (52); Sunil Narine 3/27 (4 overs)

Hobart Hurricanes won by 2 wickets
Etihad Stadium
Attendance: 26,816
Umpires: Phillip Gillespie and Paul Wilson
Player of the match: Ben McDermott (Hurricanes)

- Hobart Hurricanes won the toss and elected to field.
- The Renegades score of 222 set a new record for the highest in BBL history. This was then surpassed by the Hurricanes in the second innings
- The combined total of 445 runs set a new record for the highest number of runs scored in a BBL match
- Ben McDermott scored the second-highest individual BBL score, and third-fastest BBL century (47 balls)

21 January
16:20
Scorecard

(H) Hobart Hurricanes; 6/134 (20 overs)	v	Perth Scorchers; 3/135 (13.5 overs)
D'Arcy Short 36 (24); Mitchell Johnson 2/15 (4 overs)		Shaun Marsh 57 (34); Clive Rose 1/28 (4 overs)

Perth Scorchers won by 7 wickets
Blundstone Arena
Attendance: 17,445
Umpires: Gerard Abood and Michael Graham-Smith
Player of the match: Shaun Marsh (Scorchers)

- Perth Scorchers won the toss and elected to field.

== Squad ==
Players with international caps are listed in bold.

- Ages are given as of 20 December 2016, the date of the first match of the tournament

No.	Name	Nationality	Date of birth (age)	Batting style	Bowling style	Notes
Batsmen
10	**George Bailey**	Australia	7 September 1982 (aged 33)	Right-handed	Right arm medium	International Cap
46	Dominic Michael	Australia	8 October 1987 (aged 28)	Left-handed	Right-arm medium	
11	**Kumar Sangakkara**	Sri Lanka	27 October 1977 (aged 38)	Left-handed	Right arm medium	Visa contract & International Cap
23	D'Arcy Short	Australia	9 August 1990 (aged 25)	Left-handed	Left arm orthodox spin	
20	Beau Webster	Australia	1 December 1993 (aged 22)	Right-handed	Right arm off break	
9	Jonathan Wells	Australia	13 August 1988 (aged 27)	Right-handed	Right arm medium	
All-rounders
77	James Bazley	Australia	8 April 1995 (aged 20)	Right-handed	Right arm fast medium	
54	**Daniel Christian**	Australia	4 May 1983 (aged 32)	Right-handed	Right arm fast medium	International Cap
29	Hamish Kingston	Australia	17 December 1990 (aged 25)	Right-handed	Right arm medium	
15	Simon Milenko	Australia	24 November 1988 (aged 27)	Right-handed	Right arm fast medium	
Wicketkeepers
–	Ben McDermott	Australia	12 December 1994 (aged 21)	Right-handed	Right arm fast medium	Visa contract
27	**Tim Paine**	Australia	8 December 1984 (aged 31)	Right-handed	Right arm medium	Captain & International Cap
Pace bowlers
8	**Stuart Broad**	England	24 June 1986 (aged 29)	Right-handed	Right arm fast medium	Visa contract & International Cap
43	Sam Rainbird	Australia	5 June 1992 (aged 23)	Right-handed	Left arm fast medium	
44	Jake Reed	Australia	28 September 1990 (aged 25)	Right-handed	Right arm fast medium	
32	**Shaun Tait**	Australia	22 February 1983 (aged 32)	Right-handed	Right arm fast	International Cap
Spin bowlers
13	**Cameron Boyce**	Australia	27 July 1989 (aged 26)	Right-handed	Right arm leg spin	International Cap
31	Clive Rose	Australia	13 October 1989 (aged 26)	Right-handed	Left arm orthodox	
