= 2015–16 Hobart Hurricanes season =

Hobart Hurricanes
2015–16 season
- Coach: Damien Wright (5th season)
- Captain(s): Tim Paine (5th season)
- Home ground: Blundstone Arena, Hobart
- BBL: 7th
- BBL Finals: –
- Leading Run Scorer: George Bailey (240)
- Leading Wicket Taker: Cameron Boyce (11)
- Highest home attendance: 18,149 vs Perth Scorchers (10 January 2016)
- Lowest home attendance: 14,848 vs Brisbane Heat (22 December 2015)

The 2015–16 Hobart Hurricanes season lists the results of the Hobart Hurricanes, an Australian cricket team, in the 2015–16 season.

== League table ==
| Pos | Team | Pld | W | L | NR | Pts | NRR | Qualification |
|---|---|---|---|---|---|---|---|---|
| 1 | Adelaide Strikers | 8 | 7 | 1 | 0 | 14 | 0.544 | Advanced to semi-finals |
| 2 | Melbourne Stars | 8 | 5 | 3 | 0 | 10 | 0.366 | Advanced to semi-finals |
| 3 | Perth Scorchers | 8 | 5 | 3 | 0 | 10 | 0.181 | Advanced to semi-finals |
| 4 | Sydney Thunder (C) | 8 | 4 | 4 | 0 | 8 | 0.375 | Advanced to semi-finals |
| 5 | Melbourne Renegades | 8 | 3 | 5 | 0 | 6 | −0.041 | |
| 6 | Brisbane Heat | 8 | 3 | 5 | 0 | 6 | −0.204 | |
| 7 | Hobart Hurricanes | 8 | 3 | 5 | 0 | 6 | −0.955 | |
| 8 | Sydney Sixers | 8 | 2 | 6 | 0 | 4 | −0.330 | |

(C) Champions

== Matches ==
20 December
16:20
Scorecard

| (H) Sydney Sixers; 7/186 (20 overs) | v | Hobart Hurricanes; 91 (15.5 overs) |
| Brad Haddin 72 (45); Cameron Boyce 2/25 (4 overs) | | George Bailey 62* (45); Nathan Lyon 5/23 (3.5 overs) |

Sydney Sixers won by 95 runs
Sydney Cricket Ground
Attendance: 20,072
Umpires: Simon Fry and Phillip Gillespie
Player of the match: Brad Haddin (Sixers)

- Sydney Sixers won the toss and elected to bat.
- Sam Rainbird (Hurricanes) made his T20 debut.

22 December
19:10 (D/N)
Scorecard

| (H) Hobart Hurricanes; 3/184 (20 overs) | v | Brisbane Heat; 8/164 (20 overs) |
| Tim Paine 87* (58); Ben Cutting 1/32 (4 overs) | | Jason Floros 42 (23); Sam Rainbird 3/37 (4 overs) |

Hobart Hurricanes won by 20 runs
Blundstone Arena
Attendance: 14,848
Umpires: Greg Davidson and Michael Graham-Smith
Player of the match: Tim Paine (Hurricanes)

- Hobart Hurricanes won the toss and elected to bat.
- The crowd of 14,848 set a new record for the highest in Tasmanian domestic cricket history, beating the previous record of 14,744 set in the previous season between the same teams

29 December
18:10 (D/N)
Scorecard

| Hobart Hurricanes; 4/194 (20 overs) | v | Brisbane Heat (H); 9/179 (20 overs) |
| Daniel Christian 56* (24); Samuel Badree 2/27 (4 overs) | | Chris Lynn 101 (51); Jake Reed 3/31 (4 overs) |

Hobart Hurricanes won by 15 runs
The Gabba
Attendance: 29,876
Umpires: Ashley Barrow and Simon Fry
Player of the match: Chris Lynn (Heat)

- Hobart Hurricanes won the toss and elected to bat.
- Sam Heazlett (Heat) made his T20 debut.

1 January
19:10 (D/N)
Scorecard

| (H) Hobart Hurricanes; 6/163 (20 overs) | v | Sydney Thunder; 9/152 (20 overs) |
| George Bailey 56* (29); Clint McKay 4/28 (3 overs) | | Michael Hussey 71 (51); Shaun Tait 3/16 (4 overs) |

Hobart Hurricanes won by 11 runs
Blundstone Arena
Attendance: 17,151
Umpires: Phillip Gillespie and Geoff Joshua
Player of the match: Shaun Tait (Hurricanes)

- Sydney Thunder won the toss and elected to field.
- The crowd of 17,151 set a new record for the highest crowd at Blundstone Arena for a cricket match and the second highest crowd for any sport at the stadium

4 January
19:40 (D/N)
Scorecard

| (H) Hobart Hurricanes; 5/140 (20 overs) | v | Melbourne Renegades; 5/144 (14 overs) |
| Daniel Christian 58 (40); Xavier Doherty 2/19 (3 overs) | | Aaron Finch 60 (39); Cameron Boyce 3/34 (4 overs) |

Melbourne Renegades won by 5 wickets
Blundstone Arena
Attendance: 16,412
Umpires: Sam Nogajski and Paul Wilson
Player of the match: Chris Tremain (Renegades)

- Melbourne Renegades won the toss and elected to field.

6 January
19:40 (D/N)
Scorecard

| Hobart Hurricanes; 124 (20 overs) | v | Melbourne Stars (H); 2/126 (15 overs) |
| George Bailey 55 (40); Adam Zampa 2/18 (4 overs) | | Glenn Maxwell 56* (32); Sam Rainbird 1/25 (4 overs) |

Melbourne Stars won by 8 wickets
Melbourne Cricket Ground
Attendance: 33,603
Umpires: Geoff Joshua and Sam Nogajski
Player of the match: Glenn Maxwell (Stars)

- Melbourne Stars won the toss and elected to field.

10 January
16:20
Scorecard

| Perth Scorchers; 5/173 (20 overs) | v | Hobart Hurricanes (H); 6/172 (20 overs) |
| Michael Carberry 62 (35); Shaun Tait 2/29 (4 overs) | | Tim Paine 57 (47); Ashton Agar 2/38 (4 overs) |

Perth Scorchers won by 1 run
Blundstone Arena
Attendance: 18,149
Umpires: Ashley Barrow and Paul Wilson
Player of the match: Michael Carberry (Scorchers)

- Perth Scorchers won the toss and elected to bat.
- The crowd of 18,149 set a new record for the largest crowd for any sport at Blundstone Arena

13 January
19:10 (D/N)
Scorecard

| Hobart Hurricanes; 143 (19.3 overs) | v | Adelaide Strikers (H); 4/146 (20 overs) |
| Tim Paine 45 (39); Michael Neser 3/26 (3.3 overs) | | Tim Ludeman 57* (58); Simon Milenko 3/25 (4 overs) |

Adelaide Strikers won by 6 wickets
Adelaide Oval
Attendance: 49,115
Umpires: Shawn Craig and Paul Wilson
Player of the match: Adil Rashid (Strikers)

- Hobart Hurricanes won the toss and elected to bat.
- Greg West (Strikers) made his T20 debut.

== Squad ==
Players with international caps are listed in bold.

- Ages are given as of 17 December 2017, the date of the first match played during the tournament

| No. | Name | Nationality | Date of birth | Batting style | Bowling style | Notes |
| | Batsmen | | | | | |
|---|---|---|---|---|---|---|
| 10 | **George Bailey** | Australia | 7 September 1982 (aged 33) | Right-handed | Right arm medium | |
| 11 | **Kumar Sangakkara** | Sri Lanka | 27 October 1977 (aged 38) | Left-handed | Right arm medium | Overseas player |
| 9 | Jonathan Wells | Australia | 13 August 1988 (aged 27) | Right-handed | Right arm medium | |
| 20 | Beau Webster | Australia | 1 December 1993 (aged 22) | Right-handed | Right-arm off-break | |
| 33 | Michael Hill | Australia | 29 September 1988 (aged 27) | Left-handed | Right-arm medium | |
| 46 | Dominic Michael | Australia | 8 October 1987 (aged 28) | Left-handed | Right-arm medium | |
| | All-rounders | | | | | |
| 88 | **Darren Sammy** | West Indies | 20 December 1983 (aged 31) | Right-handed | Right arm fast medium | Overseas player |
| 54 | **Daniel Christian** | Australia | 4 May 1983 (aged 32) | Right-handed | Right arm fast medium | |
| 15 | Simon Milenko | Australia | 24 November 1988 (aged 27) | Right-handed | Right arm fast medium | |
| | Wicketkeepers | | | | | |
| 27 | **Tim Paine** | Australia | 8 December 1984 (aged 31) | Right-handed | Right arm medium | Captain |
| 51 | **Ben Dunk** | Australia | 11 March 1987 (aged 28) | Left-handed | – | |
| | Bowlers | | | | | |
| 32 | **Shaun Tait** | Australia | 22 February 1983 (aged 32) | Right-handed | Right arm fast | |
| 25 | **Timm van der Gugten** | Netherlands | 25 February 1991 (aged 24) | Right-handed | Right arm fast medium | Australian born but plays for the Netherlands |
| 44 | Jake Reed | Australia | 28 September 1990 (aged 25) | Right-handed | Right arm fast medium | |
| 43 | Sam Rainbird | Australia | 5 June 1992 (aged 23) | Right-handed | Left arm fast medium | |
| 15 | Joe Mennie | Australia | 24 December 1988 (aged 26) | Right-handed | Right arm fast medium | |
| 13 | **Cameron Boyce** | Australia | 27 July 1989 (aged 26) | Right-handed | Right arm leg spin | |
| 31 | Clive Rose | Australia | 13 October 1989 (aged 26) | Right-handed | Left arm orthodox | |
