= 2021–22 Hobart Hurricanes season =

Overview of Hobart Hurricanes in 2021–22

Hobart Hurricanes
2021–22 season
- Coach: Adam Griffith
- Captain(s): Matthew Wade
- Home ground: Bellerive Oval; University of Tasmania Stadium
- BBL Season: 5th
- BBL Playoffs: Eliminator
- Leading Run Scorer: Ben McDermott (577)
- Leading Wicket Taker: Tom Rogers (20)

The 2021–22 Hobart Hurricanes season was the eleventh in the club's history. The Australian professional men's cricket team was coached by Adam Griffith and captained by Matthew Wade, they competed in the BBL's 2021–22 season.

== Squad ==
The Hobart Hurricanes squad for the 2021–22 Big Bash League season.

- Players with international caps are listed in **bold**.
- Ages are given as of the first match of the tournament, 5 December 2021

No.	Name	Nationality	Date of birth (age)	Batting style	Bowling style	Notes
Batsmen
8	**Tim David**	Singapore	16 March 1996 (aged 25)	Right-handed		Non-visa Singaporean international
41	**Colin Ingram**	South Africa	3 July 1985 (aged 36)	Left-handed		Visa contract
9	Will Jacks	England	21 November 1998 (aged 23)	Right-handed		Visa contract
1	Caleb Jewell	Australia	21 April 1997 (aged 24)	Left-handed		
29	**Dawid Malan**	England	3 September 1987 (aged 34)	Left-handed		Visa contract
-	Charlie Wakim	Australia	9 July 1991 (aged 30)	Right-handed		
33	Macalister Wright	Australia	22 January 1998 (aged 23)	Right-handed	Right-arm Leg Break	
All-rounders
72	**Nathan Ellis**	Australia	22 December 1994 (aged 26)	Right-handed	Right-arm fast medium	
44	**James Faulkner**	Australia	29 April 1990 (aged 31)	Right-Handed	Left-arm Fast medium	
16	Mitchell Owen	Australia	16 September 2001 (aged 20)	Right-handed	Right-arm fast medium	
84	**Keemo Paul**	West Indies	21 February 1998 (aged 23)	Right-handed	Right-arm fast medium	Visa contract
23	**D'Arcy Short**	Australia	8 September 1990 (aged 31)	Left-handed	Left-arm Leg spin	
23	**Johan Botha**	Australia	2 May 1982 (aged 39)	Right-handed	Right-arm Off break	
Wicket-keepers
13	**Matthew Wade**	Australia	26 December 1987 (aged 33)	Left-handed	Right-arm medium	Captain
2	Jake Doran	Australia	2 December 1996 (aged 25)	Left-handed		
28	**Ben McDermott**	Australia	12 December 1994 (aged 26)	Right-handed		
54	**Peter Handscomb**	Australia	26 December 1994 (aged 26)	Right-handed		Vice captain
Pace bowlers
15	David Moody	Australia	28 April 1995 (aged 26)	Right-handed	Right-arm fast medium	
35	Aaron Summers	Australia	24 May 1996 (aged 25)	Right-handed	Right-arm fast	
25	**Scott Boland**	Australia	11 April 1989 (aged 32)	Right-handed	Right-arm fast medium	
21	**Riley Meredith**	Australia	21 June 1996 (aged 25)	Right-handed	Right-arm fast medium	
4	Nick Winter	Australia	19 June 1993 (aged 28)	Left-handed	Left-arm fast medium	
Spin bowlers
1	**Sandeep Lamichhane**	Nepal	2 August 2000 (aged 21)	Right-handed	Right-arm Leg spin	Visa contract
17	Wil Parker	Australia	29 May 2002 (aged 19)	Right-handed	Right-arm Leg spin	

== League table ==
Pos	Team	Pld	W	L	NR	BP	Pts	NRR	Qualification
1	Perth Scorchers (C)	14	11	3	0	7	40	0.926	Advanced to play-off phase
2	Sydney Sixers	14	9	4	1	6	35	1.027	Advanced to play-off phase
3	Sydney Thunder	14	9	5	0	8	35	0.725	Advanced to play-off phase
4	Adelaide Strikers	14	6	8	0	10	28	0.237	Advanced to play-off phase
5	Hobart Hurricanes	14	7	7	0	6	27	−0.332	Advanced to play-off phase
6	Melbourne Stars	14	7	7	0	5	26	−0.222	
7	Brisbane Heat	14	3	11	0	7	16	−0.910	
8	Melbourne Renegades	14	3	10	1	5	16	−1.477	

Source: ESPNcricinfo
(C) Champions

== League stage matches ==
8 December 2021
18:35 (N)
Scorecard

Sydney Sixers; 9/144 (20 overs)	v	Hobart Hurricanes (H); 8/130 (20 overs)
Moises Henriques 73 (48); Tom Rogers 3/28 (4 overs)		Peter Handscomb 47 (31); Tom Curran 3/27 (4 overs)

Sydney Sixers won by 14 runs
University of Tasmania Stadium, Launceston
Attendance: 3,316
Umpires: Darren Close and Bruce Oxenford
Player of the match: Moises Henriques (Sydney Sixers)

- Hobart Hurricanes won the toss and elected to field.

11 December 2021
18:35 (N)
Scorecard

Hobart Hurricanes; 2/213 (20 overs)	v	Sydney Sixers (H); 4/151 (18 overs)
Matthew Wade 93 (46); Tom Curran 1/46 (3 overs)		Josh Philippe 72 (46); Joel Paris 3/35 (4 overs)

Hobart Hurricanes won by 44 runs (DLS method)
Sydney Cricket Ground, Sydney
Attendance: 11,070
Umpires: Michael Graham-Smith and Bruce Oxenford
Player of the match: Matthew Wade (Hobart Hurricanes)

- Hobart Hurricanes won the toss and elected to bat.
- Sydney Sixers were set a revised target of 196 runs from 18 overs due to rain.
- Josh Kann (Hobart Hurricanes) made his T20 debut

14 December 2021
19:15 (N)
Scorecard

Perth Scorchers; 5/182 (20 overs)	v	Hobart Hurricanes (H); 129 (19 overs)
Mitchell Marsh 100* (60); Nathan Ellis 2/33 (4 overs)		Ben McDermott 41 (29); Tymal Mills 3/23 (4 overs)

Perth Scorchers won by 53 runs
Blundstone Arena, Hobart
Attendance: 5,673
Umpires: Gerard Abood and Donovan Koch
Player of the match: Mitchell Marsh (Perth Scorchers)

- Perth Scorchers won the toss and elected to bat.

20 December 2021
16:15 (D/N)
Scorecard

Perth Scorchers (H); 7/167 (20 overs)	v	Hobart Hurricanes; 9/125 (20 overs)
Kurtis Patterson 78 (48); Jordan Thompson 3/33 (4 overs)		Wil Parker 25* (17); Andrew Tye 3/19 (4 overs)

Perth Scorchers won by 42 runs
Blundstone Arena, Hobart
Attendance: 1,990
Umpires: Gerard Abood and Tony Wilds
Player of the match: Kurtis Patterson (Perth Scorchers)

- Perth Scorchers won the toss and elected to bat.

24 December 2021
15:30
Scorecard

(H) Hobart Hurricanes; 6/180 (20 overs)	v	Melbourne Stars; 9/156 (20 overs)
Ben McDermott 67 (43); Andre Russell 3/48 (4 overs)		Joe Clarke 52 (40); Tom Rogers 3/29 (4 overs)

Hobart Hurricanes won by 24 runs
Blundstone Arena, Hobart
Attendance: 4,967
Umpires: Darren Close and Michael Graham-Smith
Player of the match: Nathan Ellis (Hobart Hurricanes)

- Hobart Hurricanes won the toss and elected to bat.

27 December 2021
18:05 (N)
Scorecard

Adelaide Strikers; 5/175 (20 overs)	v	Hobart Hurricanes (H); 3/176 (18.3 overs)
Matt Renshaw 63 (41); Riley Meredith 3/37 (4 overs)		Ben McDermott 110* (60); Peter Siddle 1/25 (3 overs)

Hobart Hurricanes won by 7 wickets
Blundstone Arena, Hobart
Attendance: 4,896
Umpires: Simon Lightbody and Sam Nogajski
Player of the match: Ben McDermott (Hobart Hurricanes)

- Adelaide Strikers won the toss and elected to bat.

29 December 2021
19:15 (N)
Scorecard

Hobart Hurricanes; 5/206 (20 overs)	v	Melbourne Renegades (H); 121 (15.5 overs)
Ben McDermott 127 (65); Reece Topley 2/17 (4 overs)		Sam Harper 57 (35); Tom Rogers 3/24 (3 overs)

Hobart Hurricanes won by 85 runs
Marvel Stadium, Melbourne
Attendance: 8,314
Umpires: Michael Graham-Smith and Tony Wilds
Player of the match: Ben McDermott (Hobart Hurricanes)

- Melbourne Renegades won the toss and elected to field.
- Ben McDermott (Hobart Hurricanes) became the first player to score centuries in consecutive BBL matches.

1 January 2022
16:00 (D/N)
Scorecard

Brisbane Heat; 8/150 (20 overs)	v	Hobart Hurricanes (H); 8/136 (20 overs)
James Bazley 44* (27); Nathan Ellis 3/41 (4 overs)		Tom Rogers 33* (20); Xavier Bartlett 4/30 (4 overs)

Brisbane Heat won by 14 runs
Blundstone Arena, Hobart
Umpires: Michael Graham-Smith and Nathan Johnstone
Player of the match: Xavier Bartlett (Brisbane Heat)

- Hobart Hurricanes won the toss and elected to field.

5 January 2022
18:45 (N)
Scorecard

Hobart Hurricanes; 126 (19.5 overs)	v	Adelaide Strikers (H); 3/129 (15.1 overs)
D'Arcy Short 32 (32); Peter Siddle 5/23 (3.5 overs)		Matthew Short 72* (44); Sandeep Lamichhane 2/22 (4 overs)

Adelaide Strikers won by 7 wickets
Adelaide Oval, Adelaide
Umpires: Phillip Gillespie and Tony Wilds
Player of the match: Matthew Short (Adelaide Strikers)

- Adelaide Strikers won the toss and elected to field.

Match 41
8 January 2022
19:30 (N)
Scorecard

(H) Brisbane Heat; 8/144 (20 overs)	v	Hobart Hurricanes; 2/145 (17.2 overs)
Lachlan Pfeffer 69 (51); Sandeep Lamichhane 2/23 (4 overs)		Ben McDermott 93 (61); Will Prestwidge 2/37 (3.2 overs)

Hobart Hurricanes won by 8 wickets
The Gabba, Brisbane
Umpires: Gerard Abood and David Taylor
Player of the match: Ben McDermott (Hobart Hurricanes)

- Hobart Hurricanes won the toss and elected to field.
- Paddy Dooley (Brisbane Heat) and Will Sanders (Hobart Hurricanes) both made their T20 debuts.

10 January 2022
14:10
Scorecard

(H) Hobart Hurricanes; 6/139 (20 overs)	v	Sydney Thunder; 1/140 (17.2 overs)
Ben McDermott 38 (34); Nathan McAndrew 2/31 (4 overs)		Alex Hales 80* (56); D'Arcy Short 1/9 (3 overs)

Sydney Thunder won by 9 wickets
Melbourne Cricket Ground, Melbourne
Attendance: 5,802
Umpires: Gerard Abood and David Taylor
Player of the match: Alex Hales (Sydney Thunder)

- Hobart Hurricanes won the toss and elected to bat.

Match 47
13 January 2022
15:45 (D/N)
Scorecard

Hobart Hurricanes; 6/177 (20 overs)	v	Sydney Thunder (H); 9/168 (20 overs)
Matthew Wade 83* (54); Gurinder Sandhu 2/27 (3 overs)		Alex Hales 38 (17); Jordan Thompson 3/24 (3 overs)

Hobart Hurricanes won by 9 runs
Marvel Stadium, Melbourne
Attendance: 10,014
Umpires: Sam Nogajski and Troy Penman
Player of the match: Riley Meredith (Hobart Hurricanes)

- Hobart Hurricanes won the toss and elected to bat.

18 January 2022
19:15 (N)
Scorecard

(H) Hobart Hurricanes; 5/182 (20 overs)	v	Melbourne Renegades; 6/176 (20 overs)
Matthew Wade 48 (39); Josh Lalor 2/37 (4 overs); Cameron Boyce 2/37 (4 overs)		Aaron Finch 75 (52); Tom Rogers 3/35 (4 overs)

Hobart Hurricanes won by 6 runs
Marvel Stadium, Melbourne
Attendance: 1,324
Umpires: Shawn Craig and Tony Wilds
Player of the match: Aaron Finch (Melbourne Renegades)

- Hobart Hurricanes won the toss and elected to bat.

Match 56
19 January 2022
19:50 (N)
Scorecard

(H) Melbourne Stars; 2/273 (20 overs)	v	Hobart Hurricanes; 6/167 (20 overs)
Glenn Maxwell 154* (64); Jordan Thompson 1/32 (3 overs)		Ben McDermott 55 (33); Brody Couch 3/30 (4 overs)

Melbourne Stars won by 106 runs
Melbourne Cricket Ground, Melbourne
Umpires: Gerard Abood and Donovan Koch
Player of the match: Glenn Maxwell (Melbourne Stars)

- Hobart Hurricanes won the toss and elected to field.
- * Glenn Maxwell (Melbourne Stars) set a new highest individual score in a BBL match
- Melbourne Stars set a new record for the highest team total in a BBL match.

== Playoffs ==
Eliminator
21 January 2022
19:15 (N)
Scorecard

(H) Adelaide Strikers; 6/188 (20 overs)	v	Hobart Hurricanes; 166 (19.4 overs)
Matthew Short 89 (48); Riley Meredith 2/37 (4 overs); Tom Rogers 2/37 (4 overs)		D’Arcy Short 56 (34); Peter Siddle 4/32 (3.4 overs)

Adelaide Strikers won by 22 runs
Melbourne Cricket Ground, Melbourne
Umpires: Phillip Gillespie and Donovan Koch
Player of the match: Matthew Short (Adelaide Strikers)

- Adelaide Strikers won the toss and elected to bat.
