= 2011–12 Big Bash League season =

Inaugural season of the Big Bash League

2011–12 Big Bash League
- Dates: 16 December 2011 – 28 January 2012
- Administrator: Cricket Australia
- Cricket format: Twenty20
- Tournament format(s): Round-robin and knockout
- Host: Australia
- Champions: Sydney Sixers (1st title)
- Runners-up: Perth Scorchers
- Participants: 8
- Matches: 31
- Attendance: 544,920 (17,578 per match)
- Player of the series: David Hussey (Melbourne Stars)
- Most runs: Travis Birt (Hobart Hurricanes) (345)
- Most wickets: Rana Naved-ul-Hasan (Hobart Hurricanes) (15)
- Official website: www.bigbash.com.au

The 2011–12 Big Bash League season or BBL|01 was the inaugural season of the Big Bash League, the top-class franchise Twenty20 cricket competition in Australia. The tournament replaced the KFC Twenty20 Big Bash, which ran each season from 2005–06 to 2010–11 featuring state teams.

The tournament was won by the Sydney Sixers, which defeated Perth Scorchers in the final at the WACA Ground on 28 January 2012. David Hussey of the Melbourne Stars was named the player of the tournament, having scored 243 runs and taken eight wickets in eight matches.

== Teams ==
The competition features eight city-based franchises, instead of the six state-based teams which had previously competed in the KFC Twenty20 Big Bash. Each state's capital city features one team, with Sydney and Melbourne featuring two.

Team	City	State	Home ground	Coach	Captain	Overseas player(s)
Adelaide Strikers	Adelaide	South Australia	Adelaide Oval	Darren Berry	Michael Klinger	Kieron Pollard, Alfonso Thomas, James Franklin
Brisbane Heat	Brisbane	Queensland	The Gabba	Darren Lehmann	James Hopes	Brendon McCullum, Roelof van der Merwe, Daniel Vettori
Hobart Hurricanes	Hobart	Tasmania	Blundstone Arena	Allister de Winter	Tim Paine	Rana Naved-ul-Hasan, Owais Shah
Melbourne Renegades	Melbourne	Victoria	Etihad Stadium	Simon Helmot	Andrew McDonald	Shahid Afridi, Abdul Razzaq
Melbourne Stars	Melbourne	Victoria	Melbourne Cricket Ground	Greg Shipperd	Cameron White	Luke Wright, Jade Dernbach
Perth Scorchers	Perth	Western Australia	WACA Ground	Mickey Arthur	Marcus North	Paul Collingwood, Herschelle Gibbs
Sydney Sixers	Sydney	New South Wales	Sydney Cricket Ground	Trevor Bayliss	Brad Haddin	Michael Lumb, Dwayne Bravo, Nathan McCullum
Sydney Thunder	Sydney	New South Wales	Stadium Australia	Shane Duff	David Warner	Fidel Edwards, Chris Gayle

== League stage ==
Fixtures were announced in July 2011. The final was played on 28 January 2012.

=== Points table ===
Pos	Team	Pld	W	L	NR	Pts	NRR	Qualification
1	Perth Scorchers	7	5	2	0	10	0.626	Advanced to semi-finals
2	Hobart Hurricanes	7	5	2	0	10	0.569	Advanced to semi-finals
3	Sydney Sixers (C)	7	5	2	0	10	0.262	Advanced to semi-finals
4	Melbourne Stars	7	4	3	0	8	0.254	Advanced to semi-finals
5	Brisbane Heat	7	3	4	0	6	0.324	
6	Adelaide Strikers	7	2	5	0	4	−0.338	
7	Melbourne Renegades	7	2	5	0	4	−0.582	
8	Sydney Thunder	7	2	5	0	4	−1.250	

(C) Champions

=== Fixtures ===
16 December 2011
19:00 UTC+11 (D/N)
Scorecard

Brisbane Heat; 8/139 (20 overs)	v	(H) Sydney Sixers; 3/140 (18.4 overs)
Daniel Christian 32 (22); Stuart MacGill 2/21 (4 overs)		Brad Haddin 76 (59); Daniel Christian 1/20 (4 overs)

Sydney Sixers won by 7 wickets
Sydney Cricket Ground
Attendance: 12,285
Umpires: Bruce Oxenford and Paul Reiffel
Player of the match: Brad Haddin (Sydney Sixers)

- Brisbane Heat won the toss and elected to bat.

17 December 2011
19:00 UTC+11 (D/N)
Scorecard

(H) Melbourne Stars; 7/153 (20 overs)	v	Sydney Thunder; 4/154 (19 overs)
David Hussey 52 (27); Doug Bollinger 2/22 (3 overs)		David Warner 102* (51); James Faulkner 2/20 (4 overs)

Sydney Thunder won by 6 wickets
Melbourne Cricket Ground
Attendance: 23,496
Umpires: Simon Fry and Paul Wilson
Player of the match: David Warner (Sydney Thunder)

- Sydney Thunder won the toss and elected to field.

18 December 2011
17:30 UTC+10:30 (D/N)
Scorecard

(H) Adelaide Strikers; 5/189 (20 overs)	v	Melbourne Renegades; 122 (17.5 overs)
Daniel Harris 49 (33); Aaron Heal 2/32 (4 overs)		Glenn Maxwell 46 (31); Kane Richardson 3/27 (4 overs)

Adelaide Strikers won by 67 runs
Adelaide Oval
Attendance: 11,742
Umpires: Ashley Barrow And Bruce Oxenford
Player of the match: Michael Klinger (Adelaide Strikers)

- Melbourne Renegades won the toss and elected to field.

18 December 2011
18:00 UTC+8 (D/N)
Scorecard

Hobart Hurricanes; 140 (19.3 overs)	v	(H) Perth Scorchers; 109 (19.5 overs)
Travis Birt 40 (30); Ben Edmondson 4/40 (4 overs)		Mitchell Marsh 35 (35); Ben Hilfenhaus 2/10 (4 overs)

Hobart Hurricanes won by 31 runs
WACA Ground
Attendance: 13,307
Umpires: Gerard Abood and Tony Ward
Player of the match: Ben Hilfenhaus (Hobart Hurricanes)

- Hobart Hurricanes won the toss and elected to bat.

20 December 2011
18:30 UTC+10 (D/N)
Scorecard

Melbourne Stars; 7/177 (20 overs)	v	Brisbane Heat (H); 7/169 (20 overs)
Robert Quiney 97 (60); Nathan Hauritz 3/18 (4 Overs)		Brendon McCullum 36 (25); Clint McKay 3/22 (4 Overs)

Melbourne Stars won by 8 runs
The Gabba
Attendance: 29,241
Umpires: Paul Reiffel and Ian Lock
Player of the match: Robert Quiney

- Melbourne Stars won the toss and elected to bat.

21 December 2011
19:00 UTC+11 (D/N)
Scorecard

(H) Hobart Hurricanes; 3/169 (20 overs)	v	Sydney Sixers; 9/127 (20 overs)
Phil Jaques 73 (55); Mitchell Starc 2/35 (4 overs)		Nic Maddinson 33 (27); Naved-ul-Hasan 4/22 (4 overs)

Hobart Hurricanes won by 42 runs
Blundstone Arena
Attendance: 8,298
Umpires: Geoff Joshua and Simon Fry
Player of the match: Travis Birt (Hobart Hurricanes)

- Hobart Hurricanes won the toss and elected to bat.

22 December 2011
19:00 UTC+11 (D/N)
Scorecard

(H) Melbourne Renegades; 3/188 (20 overs)	v	Perth Scorchers; 2/192 (19.2 overs)
Andrew McDonald 50 (33); Michael Beer 2/28 (4 overs)		Shaun Marsh 99* (52); Andrew McDonald 1/21 (2 overs)

Perth Scorchers won by 8 wickets
Etihad Stadium
Attendance: 13,265
Umpires: Gerard Abood and Bob Parry
Player of the match: Shaun Marsh (Perth Scorchers)

- Melbourne Renegades won the toss and elected to bat.

23 December 2011
19:00 UTC+11 (D/N)
Scorecard

Adelaide Strikers; 8/155 (20 overs)	v	Sydney Thunder (H); 4/156 (18.3 overs)
Johan Botha 41 (33); Sean Abbott 2/20 (4 overs)		Chris Gayle 100 (51); Aaron O'Brien 3/26 (4 overs)

Sydney Thunder won by 6 wickets
ANZ Stadium
Attendance: 11,337
Umpires: Mick Martell and Paul Wilson
Player of the match: Chris Gayle (Sydney Thunder)

- Adelaide Strikers won the toss and elected to bat.

27 December 2011
19:00 UTC+11 (D/N)
Scorecard

(H) Sydney Sixers; 9/166 (20 overs)	v	Melbourne Stars; 8/164 (20 overs)
Dwayne Bravo 51 (39); Clint McKay 2/35 (4 overs)		David Hussey 42 (30); Steve Smith 2/27 (4 overs)

Sydney Sixers won by 2 runs
Sydney Cricket Ground
Attendance: 27,520
Umpires: Gerard Abood and Bruce Oxenford
Player of the match: Dwayne Bravo

- Sydney Sixers won the toss and elected to bat.

28 December 2011
19:00 UTC+10:30 (D/N)
Scorecard

Hobart Hurricanes; 4/171 (20 overs)	v	Adelaide Strikers (H); 8/157 (20 overs)
Travis Birt 44 (26); Johan Botha 2/28 (4 overs)		Tom Cooper 43* (27); Xavier Doherty 4/17 (4 overs)

Hobart Hurricanes won by 14 runs
Adelaide Oval
Attendance: 27,380
Umpires: Geoff Joshua and John Ward
Player of the match: Xavier Doherty (Hobart Hurricanes)

- Hobart Hurricanes won the toss and elected to bat.

29 December 2011
18:00 UTC+8 (D/N)
Scorecard

(H) Perth Scorchers; 8/162 (20 overs)	v	Brisbane Heat; 6/152 (20 overs)
Marcus North 40 (29); Michael Neser 2/23 (3 overs)		Peter Forrest 59 (42); Ben Edmondson 2/33 (4 overs)

Perth Scorchers won by 10 runs
WACA Ground
Attendance: 15,454
Umpires: Mick Martell and Paul Wilson
Player of the match: Marcus North (Perth Scorchers)

- Perth Scorchers won the toss and elected to bat.

30 December 2011
19:00 UTC+11 (D/N)
Scorecard

Melbourne Renegades; 8/140 (20 overs)	v	Sydney Thunder (H); 7/134 (20 overs)
Brad Hodge 44 (31); Sean Abbott 2/21 (4 overs)		Chris Gayle 75 (54); Shahid Afridi 3/21 (4 overs)

Melbourne Renegades won by 6 runs
ANZ Stadium
Attendance: 18,731
Umpires: Ian Lock and Tony Ward
Player of the match: Shahid Afridi (Melbourne Renegades)

- Melbourne Renegades won the toss and elected to bat.

1 January 2012
19:00 UTC+11 (D/N)
Scorecard

Sydney Thunder; 8/138 (20 overs)	v	Hobart Hurricanes (H); 5/139 (18.4 overs)
Chris Gayle 53 (33); Rana Naved-ul-Hasan 3/22 (4 overs)		Owais Shah 41* (32); Scott Coyte 2/14 (4 overs)

Hobart Hurricanes won by 5 wickets
Blundstone Arena
Attendance: 12,238
Umpires: Ian Lock and Bob Parry
Player of the match: Rana Naved-ul-Hasan (Hobart Hurricanes)

- Sydney Thunder won the toss and elected to bat.

2 January 2012
19:00 UTC+11 (D/N)
Scorecard

Sydney Sixers; 6/161 (20 overs)	v	Melbourne Renegades (H); 2/164 (17.4 overs)
Moises Henriques 41 (30); Dirk Nannes 2/36 (4 overs)		Brad Hodge 72* (51); Josh Hazlewood 1/19 (2 overs)

Melbourne Renegades won by 8 wickets
Etihad Stadium
Attendance: 10,818
Umpires: Mick Martell and Paul Reiffel
Player of the match: Andrew McDonald (Melbourne Renegades)

- Sydney Sixers won the toss and elected to bat.

3 January 2012
18:30 UTC+10 (D/N)
Scorecard

Adelaide Strikers; 4/166 (20 overs)	v	Brisbane Heat (H); 135 (18 overs)
Michael Klinger 53 (44); Alister McDermott 2/31 (4 overs)		Steve Paulsen 35* (26); Kane Richardson 2/2 (2 overs)

Adelaide Strikers won by 31 runs
The Gabba
Attendance: 14,397
Umpires: Simon Fry and John Ward
Player of the match: Tom Cooper (Adelaide Strikers)

- Adelaide Strikers won the toss and elected to bat.

4 January 2012
19:00 UTC+11 (D/N)
Scorecard

Perth Scorchers; 136 (20 overs)	v	Melbourne Stars (H); 5/128 (20 overs)
Herschelle Gibbs 69 (48); James Faulkner 3/17 (4 overs)		Matthew Wade 53* (43); Nathan Coulter-Nile 2/20 (3 overs)

Perth Scorchers won by 8 runs
Melbourne Cricket Ground
Attendance: 19,840
Umpires: Mick Martell and Paul Wilson
Player of the match: Herschelle Gibbs (Perth Scorchers)

- Perth Scorchers won the toss and elected to bat.

6 January 2012
18:30 UTC+10
Scorecard

(H) Brisbane Heat; 4/201 (20 overs)	v	Hobart Hurricanes; 4/198 (20 overs)
Matthew Hayden 76 (51); Rhett Lockyear 1/13 (1 over)		Travis Birt 74 (36); Roelof van der Merwe 1/23 (3 overs)

Brisbane Heat won by 3 runs
The Gabba
Attendance: 15,134
Umpires: Ashley Barrow and Paul Wilson
Player of the match: Matthew Hayden (Brisbane Heat)

- Brisbane Heat won the toss and elected to bat.

7 January 2012
19:00 UTC+11 (D/N)
Scorecard

(H) Melbourne Stars; 5/167 (20 overs)	v	Melbourne Renegades; 3/58 (8.1 overs)
David Hussey 51 (42); Shahid Afridi 2/20 (4 overs)		Glenn Maxwell 28 (24); Shane Warne 1/4 (1 over)

Melbourne Stars won by 11 runs (D/L)
Melbourne Cricket Ground
Attendance: 40,227
Umpires: Simon Fry and Geoff Joshua
Player of the match: David Hussey (Melbourne Stars)

- Melbourne Stars won the toss and elected to bat.
- Rain ended the match during the Melbourne Renegades' innings after 8.1 overs. Their target was 70 runs according to the Duckworth–Lewis method.

8 January 2012
18:00 UTC+11 (D/N)
Scorecard

Sydney Sixers; 7/117 (16 overs)	v	Sydney Thunder (H); 4/29 (5.3 overs)
Ben Rohrer 38 (24); Sean Abbott 2/17 (2 overs)		Jason Floros 15 (10); Mitchell Starc 3/17 (2.3 overs)

Sydney Sixers wins by 17 runs (D/L)
ANZ Stadium
Attendance: 31,262
Umpires: Bruce Oxenford and Paul Reiffel
Player of the match: Mitchell Starc

- Sydney Sixers won the toss and elected to bat.
- Rain ended the match during the Sydney Thunder's innings after 5.3 overs.

8 January 2012
18:00 UTC+8 (D/N)
Scorecard

(H) Perth Scorchers; 5/184 (20 overs)	v	Adelaide Strikers; 142 (19.3 overs)
Marcus North 70 (52); James Muirhead 2/37 [3 overs]		Michael Klinger 32 (22); Brad Hogg 3/20 [4 overs]

Perth Scorchers won by 42 runs
WACA Ground
Attendance: 15,953
Umpires: Robert Parry and Tony Ward
Player of the match: Brad Hogg

- Perth Scorchers won the toss and elected to bat.

9 January 2012
19:00 UTC+11 (D/N)
Scorecard

Melbourne Stars; 3/203 (20 overs)	v	(H) Hobart Hurricanes; 9/184 (20 overs)
Luke Wright 117 (60); Naved-ul-Hasan 2/38 (4 overs)		Owais Shah 55 (37); James Faulkner 4/46 (4 overs)

Melbourne Stars won by 19 runs
Blundstone Arena
Attendance: 13,713
Umpires: Geoff Joshua and John Ward
Player of the match: Luke Wright (Melbourne Stars)

- Melbourne Stars won the toss and elected to bat.

10 January 2012
19:00 UTC+10:30 (D/N)
Scorecard

Sydney Sixers; 8/151 (20 overs)	v	Adelaide Strikers (H); 87 (18.4 overs)
Moises Henriques 42 (37); Alfonso Thomas 3/24 (4 overs)		Aiden Blizzard 27 (21); Steve O'Keefe 3/20 (4 overs)

Sydney Sixers won by 64 runs
Adelaide Oval
Attendance: 26,837
Umpires: Ashley Barrow and Mick Martell
Player of the match: Stephen O'Keefe (Sydney Sixers)

- Sydney Sixers won the toss and elected to bat.

11 January 2012
19:00 UTC+11 (D/N)
Scorecard

(H) Sydney Thunder; 99 (19.2 overs)	v	Perth Scorchers; 1/103 (14.1 overs)
Tim Armstrong 25 (25); Nathan Coulter-Nile 3/9 (3 overs)		Mitchell Marsh 64* (58); Scott Coyte 1/19 (3.1 overs)

Perth Scorchers won by 9 wickets
ANZ Stadium
Attendance: 12,363
Umpires: Gerard Abood and Mick Martell
Player of the match: Nathan Coulter-Nile (Perth Scorchers)

- Sydney Thunder won the toss and elected to bat.

12 January 2012
19:00 UTC+11 (D/N)
Scorecard

Brisbane Heat; 7/168 (20 overs)	v	Melbourne Renegades (H); 9/156 (20 overs)
Daniel Vettori 40 (25); Shahid Afridi 3/35 (4 overs)		Aaron Finch 72 (46); Alister McDermott 3/18 (4 overs)

Brisbane Heat won by 12 runs
Etihad Stadium
Attencance: 15,888
Umpires: Ian Lock and Tony Ward
Player of the match: Daniel Vettori (Brisbane Heat)

- Brisbane Heat won the toss and elected to bat.

17 January 2012
18:30 UTC+10
Scorecard

(H) Brisbane Heat; 4/195 (20 overs)	v	Sydney Thunder; 6/104 (20 overs)
Daniel Christian 75* (47); Nic Bills 2/44 (4 overs)		Usman Khawaja 37 (36); Alister McDermott 2/25 (4 overs)

Brisbane Heat won by 91 runs
The Gabba
Attendance: 9,514
Umpires: Simon Fry and John Ward
Player of the match: Daniel Christian (Brisbane Heat)

- Sydney Thunder won the toss and elected to field

18 January 2012
16:00 UTC+11
Scorecard

Melbourne Renegades; 4/173 (20 overs)	v	Hobart Hurricanes (H); 3/174 (19.5 overs)
Aaron Finch 67 (45); Jason Krejza 3/39 (4 overs)		Jonathan Wells 72 (61); Dirk Nannes 1/22 (4 overs)

Hobart Hurricanes won by 7 wickets
Blundstone Arena
Attendance: 7,820
Umpires: Gerard Abood and Ashley Barrow
Player of the match: Owais Shah (Hobart Hurricanes)

- Melbourne Renegades won the toss and elected to bat.

18 January 2012
19:00 UTC+11 (D/N)
Scorecard

(H) Sydney Sixers; 176 (20 overs)	v	Perth Scorchers; 6/175 (20 overs)
Steve Smith 51 (25); Nathan Coulter-Nile 3/38 (4 overs)		Marcus North 59 (52); Mitchell Starc 3/28 (4 overs)

Sydney Sixers won by 1 run
Sydney Cricket Ground
Attendance: 20,400
Umpires: Simon Fry and Paul Wilson
Player of the match: Mitchell Starc (Sydney Sixers)

- Sydney Sixers won the toss and elected to bat

19 January 2012
19:00 UTC+11 (D/N)
Scorecard

Adelaide Strikers; 125 (19.3 overs)	v	Melbourne Stars (H); 4/129 (18.5 overs)
Callum Ferguson 41 (29); Clint McKay 3/17 (4 overs)		David Hussey 41* (36); James Franklin 2/21 (3 overs)

Melbourne Stars won by 6 wickets
Melbourne Cricket Ground
Attendance: 26,133
Umpires: Ian Lock and Bob Parry
Player of the match: Clint McKay (Melbourne Stars)

- Adelaide Strikers won the toss and elected to bat

== Play-offs ==
Semi-finals
1	Perth Scorchers (H)	3/174 (20)
4	Melbourne Stars	8/163 (20)
2	Hobart Hurricanes (H)	7/146 (20)
3	Sydney Sixers	6/153 (20)

Final
1	Perth Scorchers (H)	8/156 (20)
3	Sydney Sixers	3/158 (18.5)

=== Semi-final 1 ===
21 January 2012
17:00 UTC+8 (D/N)
Scorecard

(H) Perth Scorchers; 3/174 (20 overs)	v	Melbourne Stars; 8/163 (20 overs)
Herschelle Gibbs 71 (46); Luke Wright 1/14 (2 overs)		James Faulkner 38 (27); Brad Hogg 2/17 (4 overs)

Perth Scorchers won by 11 runs
WACA Ground
Attendance: 15,225
Umpires: Simon Fry and John Ward
Player of the match: Mitchell Marsh (Perth Scorchers)

- Perth Scorchers won the toss and elected to bat

=== Semi-final 2 ===
22 January 2012
19:00 UTC+11 (D/N)
Scorecard

Sydney Sixers; 6/153 (20 overs)	v	Hobart Hurricanes (H); 7/146 (20 overs)
Nic Maddinson 68 (51); Ben Laughlin 2/25 (4 overs)		Phil Jaques 63 (48); Brett Lee 2/22 (4 overs)

Sydney Sixers won by 7 runs
Blundstone Arena
Attendance: 14,185
Umpires: Mick Martell and Paul Reiffel
Player of the match: Nic Maddinson (Sydney Sixers)

- Sydney Sixers won the toss and elected to bat

=== Final ===
28 January 2012
17:00 UTC+8 (D/N)
Scorecard

(H) Perth Scorchers; 5/156 (20 overs)	v	Sydney Sixers; 3/158 (18.5 overs)
Mitchell Marsh 77 (57); Brett Lee 2/21 (4 overs)		Moisés Henriques 70 (41); Ben Edmondson 2/25 (3.5 overs)

Sydney Sixers won by 7 wickets
WACA Ground
Attendance: 16,255
Umpires: Paul Reiffel and John Ward
Player of the match: Moisés Henriques (Sydney Sixers)

- Perth Scorchers won the toss and elected to bat

== Statistics ==
Highest team totals
Team	Total	Opponent	Ground
Melbourne Stars	3/203	Hobart Hurricanes	Blundstone Arena
Brisbane Heat	4/201	Hobart Hurricanes	The Gabba, Brisbane
Hobart Hurricanes	4/198	Brisbane Heat	The Gabba, Brisbane
Brisbane Heat	4/195	Sydney Thunder	The Gabba, Brisbane
Perth Scorchers	2/192	Melbourne Renegades	Etihad Stadium, Melbourne

- Source: CricInfo

Most runs
Player	Team	Runs
Travis Birt	Hobart Hurricanes	345
Mitchell Marsh	Perth Scorchers	309
Herschelle Gibbs	Perth Scorchers	302
Owais Shah	Hobart Hurricanes	282
Nic Maddinson	Sydney Sixers	275

- Source: CricInfo

Highest individual score
Player	Team	Score	Opponent	Ground
Luke Wright	Melbourne Stars	117	Hobart Hurricanes	Blundstone Arena, Hobart
David Warner	Sydney Thunder	102*	Melbourne Stars	Melbourne Cricket Ground, Melbourne
Chris Gayle	Sydney Thunder	100*	Adelaide Strikers	ANZ Stadium, Sydney
Shaun Marsh	Perth Scorchers	99*	Melbourne Renegades	Etihad Stadium, Melbourne
Robert Quiney	Melbourne Stars	97	Brisbane Heat	Brisbane Cricket Ground, Brisbane

- Source: CricInfo

Most wickets
Player	Team	Wickets
Naved-ul-Hasan	Hobart Hurricanes	15
Ben Edmondson	Perth Scorchers	14
Mitchell Starc	Sydney Sixers	13
Brad Hogg	Perth Scorchers	13
James Faulkner	Melbourne Stars	13

- Source: CricInfo

Best bowling figures
Player	Team	Figures	Opponent	Ground
Xavier Doherty	Hobart Hurricanes	4/17	Adelaide Strikers	Adelaide Oval, Adelaide
Naved-ul-Hasan	Hobart Hurricanes	4/22	Sydney Sixers	Bellerive Oval, Hobart
Ben Edmondson	Perth Scorchers	4/40	Hobart Hurricanes	Western Australia Cricket Association Ground, Perth
James Faulkner	Melbourne Stars	4/46	Hobart Hurricanes	Bellerive Oval, Hobart
Nathan Coulter-Nile	Perth Scorchers	3/9	Sydney Thunder	ANZ Stadium, Sydney

- Source: CricInfo

== Attendance ==
The following table lists the matches with the highest attendance during this season.

Home team	Attendance	Opponent	Ground
Melbourne Stars	40,227	Melbourne Renegades	Melbourne Cricket Ground
Sydney Thunder	31,262	Sydney Sixers	ANZ Stadium
Brisbane Heat	29,241	Melbourne Stars	The Gabba
Sydney Sixers	27,520	Melbourne Stars	Sydney Cricket Ground
Adelaide Strikers	27,380	Hobart Hurricanes	Adelaide Oval
Adelaide Strikers	26,837	Sydney Sixers	Adelaide Oval
Melbourne Stars	26,133	Adelaide Strikers	Melbourne Cricket Ground

Average attendance
Team	Ground	Attendance
Melbourne Stars	Melbourne Cricket Ground	27,424
Adelaide Strikers	Adelaide Oval	21,986
Sydney Sixers	Sydney Cricket Ground	20,068
Sydney Thunder	ANZ Stadium	18,423
Brisbane Heat	The Gabba	17,072
Perth Scorchers	WACA Ground	14,905
Melbourne Renegades	Etihad Stadium	13,324
Hobart Hurricanes	Bellerive Oval	10,517
