= 2016–17 Big Bash League season =

Cricket tournament

2016–17 Big Bash League
- Dates: 20 December 2016 – 28 January 2017
- Administrator: Cricket Australia
- Cricket format: Twenty20
- Tournament format(s): Group stage and knockout
- Champions: Perth Scorchers (3rd title)
- Participants: 8
- Matches: 35
- Attendance: 1,053,997 (30,114 per match)
- Player of the series: Chris Lynn (Brisbane Heat)
- Most runs: Ben Dunk (364), (Adelaide Strikers)
- Most wickets: Sean Abbott (20), (Sydney Sixers)
- Official website: bigbash.com.au

The 2016–17 Big Bash League season or BBL|06 was the sixth season of the KFC Big Bash League, the professional men's Twenty20 domestic cricket competition in Australia. The tournament ran from 20 December 2016 to 28 January 2017. The format of the tournament was identical to previous seasons with each team played eight group-stage matches, four at home and four away, before the top four ranked teams progressed to the semi-finals.

Perth Scorchers won the title, defeating Sydney Sixers by nine wickets in the final to claim their third title. Chris Lynn of Brisbane Heat was named player of the tournament for the second consecutive season, scoring 309 runs from just five matches. The leading run-scorer was Ben Dunk of Adelaide Strikers, who scored 364 runs over the season. The leading wicket-taker was Sean Abbott of Sydney Sixers, who took 20 wickets from ten matches. He was also named the best player under 25 in the tournament.

== Pre-season ==
Warm up matches

2 December 2016
Scorecard

Canterbury Kings; 7/172 (20 overs)	v	Sydney Thunder; 5/152 (20 overs)

Canterbury Kings won by 20 runs
Hagley Oval, Christchurch, New Zealand

13 December 2016
Scorecard

Melbourne Stars; 8/150 (20 overs)	v	Sydney Thunder (H); 6/138 (20 overs)

Melbourne Stars won by 12 runs
Lavington Sports Ground, Albury

13 December 2016
Scorecard

(H) Sydney Thunder; 4/149 (20 overs)	v	Melbourne Stars; 7/143 (20 overs)

Sydney Thunder won by 6 runs
Lavington Sports Ground, Albury

16 December 2016
Scorecard

Hobart Hurricanes; 7/154 (20 overs)	v	Brisbane Heat; 5/158 (19.2 overs)

Brisbane Heat won by 5 wickets
Buderim, Queensland

17 December 2016
Scorecard

Brisbane Heat; 6/188 (20 overs)	v	Hobart Hurricanes; 8/140 (20 overs)

Brisbane Heat won by 48 runs
Buderim, Queensland

19 December 2016
Scorecard

Melbourne Renegades; 6/164 (20 overs)	v	Melbourne Stars; 2/165 (15.3 overs)

Melbourne Stars won by 8 wickets
Merv Hughes Oval, Footscray

Festival of Cricket matches

13 December 2016
Scorecard

Legends XI; 5/174 (20 overs)	v	Perth Scorchers; 3/177 (16.5 overs)

Perth Scorchers won by 7 wickets
Aquinas College, Perth

== League stage ==
A total of 32 matches were played during the group stage.

=== Points table ===
Pos	Team	Pld	W	L	NR	Pts	NRR	Qualification
1	Perth Scorchers (C)	8	5	3	0	10	0.618	Advanced to semi-finals
2	Brisbane Heat	8	5	3	0	10	0.516	Advanced to semi-finals
3	Sydney Sixers	8	5	3	0	10	−0.848	Advanced to semi-finals
4	Melbourne Stars	8	4	4	0	8	0.397	Advanced to semi-finals
5	Melbourne Renegades	8	4	4	0	8	0.042	
6	Adelaide Strikers	8	3	5	0	6	0.334	
7	Hobart Hurricanes	8	3	5	0	6	−0.530	
8	Sydney Thunder	8	3	5	0	6	−0.600	

(C) Champions

=== Match summary ===
Visitor team →	ADS	BRH	HBH	MLR	MLS	PRS	SYS	SYT
Home team ↓	ADS	BRH	HBH	MLR	MLS	PRS	SYS	SYT
Adelaide Strikers		Heat; 10 runs	Strikers; 5 wickets	Renegades; 6 runs			Strikers; 48 runs	
Brisbane Heat			Heat; 7 wickets	Renegades; 1 run		Scorchers; 27 runs	Sixers; 3 wickets	
Hobart Hurricanes	Hurricanes; 8 wickets				Stars; 7 wickets	Scorchers; 7 wickets		Thunder; 6 wickets
Melbourne Renegades			Hurricanes; 2 wickets		Stars; 46 runs	Scorchers; 4 wickets		Renegades; 49 runs
Melbourne Stars	Stars; 2 wickets	Heat; 7 wickets		Renegades; 7 runs (D/L)			Sixers; 3 wickets	
Perth Scorchers	Scorchers; 48 runs	Heat; 9 wickets			Stars; 7 wickets			Scorchers; 50 runs
Sydney Sixers			Hurricanes; 60 runs	Sixers; 6 wickets		Sixers; 6 wickets		Thunder; 8 wickets
Sydney Thunder	Strikers; 77 runs	Heat; 3 wickets			Thunder; 6 wickets		Sixers; 9 wickets	

Home team won	Visitor team won

- Note: Results listed are according to the home (horizontal) and visitor (vertical) teams.
- Note: Click on a result to see a summary of the match.

=== Matches ===
20 December
19:40 (D/N)
Scorecard

(H) Sydney Thunder; 8/159 (20 overs)	v	Sydney Sixers; 1/160 (18 overs)
Ryan Gibson 53 (43); Joe Mennie 2/16 (2 overs)		Moises Henriques 76* (41); Andre Russell 1/27 (4 overs)

Sydney Sixers won by 9 wickets
Spotless Stadium
Attendance: 21,798
Umpires: John Ward and Paul Wilson
Player of the match: Moises Henriques (Sixers)

- Sydney Sixers won the toss and elected to field.
- Ryan Gibson (Thunder) made his T20 debut.
- The crowd of 21,798 is the highest ever crowd for a cricket match at Spotless Stadium.

21 December
19:10 (D/N)
Scorecard

Brisbane Heat; 5/206 (20 overs)	v	Adelaide Strikers (H); 6/196 (20 overs)
Alex Ross 64 (36); Kieron Pollard 2/27 (4 overs)		Ben Dunk 85 (43); Mark Steketee 3/32 (4 overs)

Brisbane Heat won by 10 runs
Adelaide Oval
Attendance: 38,011
Umpires: Shawn Craig and Sam Nogajski
Player of the match: Brendon McCullum (Heat)

- Adelaide Strikers won the toss and elected to field.
- Liam O'Connor, Jake Weatherald (Strikers) and Jack Wildermuth (Heat) all made their T20 debuts.

22 December
19:40 (D/N)
Scorecard

(H) Melbourne Renegades; 7/179 (20 overs)	v	Sydney Thunder; 130 (19.1 overs)
Aaron Finch 63 (37); Andre Russell 2/42 (4 overs)		Ryan Gibson 39 (37); Brad Hogg 2/22 (4 overs)

Melbourne Renegades won by 49 runs
Etihad Stadium
Attendance: 23,015
Umpires: Gerard Abood and Simon Fry
Player of the match: Aaron Finch (Renegades)

- Sydney Thunder won the toss and elected to field.
- Arjun Nair (Thunder) made his T20 debut.

23 December
18:10 (D/N)
Scorecard

Hobart Hurricanes; 6/200 (20 overs)	v	Sydney Sixers (H); 140 (16.2 overs)
Tim Paine 63 (45); Sean Abbott 2/41 (4 overs)		Sam Billings 42 (33); Clive Rose 2/14 (2 overs)

Hobart Hurricanes won by 60 runs
Sydney Cricket Ground
Attendance: 21,002
Umpires: Phillip Gillespie and Paul Wilson
Player of the match: D'Arcy Short (Hurricanes)

- Sydney Sixers won the toss and elected to field.
- D'Arcy Short (Hurricanes) made his T20 debut.

23 December
18:15 (D/N)
Scorecard

(H) Perth Scorchers; 7/197 (20 overs)	v	Adelaide Strikers; 9/149 (20 overs)
Ian Bell 61 (42); Michael Neser 2/37 (4 overs)		Brad Hodge 56 (33); Mitchell Johnson 3/33 (4 overs)

Perth Scorchers won by 48 runs
#TheFurnace
Attendance: 20,430
Umpires: Greg Davidson and Mick Martell
Player of the match: Ashton Turner (Scorchers)

- Adelaide Strikers won the toss and elected to field.

26 December
19:10 (D/N)
Scorecard

(H) Hobart Hurricanes; 4/188 (20 overs)	v	Melbourne Stars; 3/191 (17.4 overs)
Tim Paine 91 (61); Ben Hilfenhaus 3/38 (4 overs)		Rob Quiney 75 (43); Stuart Broad 2/35 (3.4 overs)

Melbourne Stars won by 7 wickets
Blundstone Arena
Attendance: 18,079
Umpires: Geoff Joshua and Paul Wilson
Player of the match: Rob Quiney (Stars)

- Hobart Hurricanes won the toss and elected to bat.
- Sam Harper (Stars) made his T20 debut.

27 December
19:10 (D/N)
Scorecard

Perth Scorchers; 8/130 (20 overs)	v	Sydney Sixers (H); 4/132 (18 overs)
Mitchell Marsh 31* (29); William Somerville 2/10 (2 overs)		Sam Billings 40 (30); Andrew Tye 3/15 (4 overs)

Sydney Sixers won by 6 wickets
Sydney Cricket Ground
Attendance: 30,013
Umpires: Simon Fry and Michael Graham-Smith
Player of the match: Johan Botha (Sixers)

- Perth Scorchers won the toss and elected to bat.

28 December
19:10 (D/N)
Scorecard

(H) Sydney Thunder; 7/157 (20 overs)	v	Brisbane Heat; 7/160 (19.4 overs)
Eoin Morgan 52 (43); Samuel Badree 2/20 (4 overs)		Chris Lynn 85* (48); Fawad Ahmed 2/19 (4 overs)

Brisbane Heat won by 3 wickets
Spotless Stadium
Attendance: 20,234
Umpires: Shawn Craig and Damien Mealey
Player of the match: Chris Lynn (Heat)

- Brisbane Heat won the toss and elected to field.

29 December
19:10 (D/N)
Scorecard

(H) Melbourne Renegades; 8/148 (20 overs)	v	Perth Scorchers; 6/152 (20 overs)
Cameron White 37 (29); David Willey 2/15 (3 overs)		Michael Klinger 72 (55); Sunil Narine 2/20 (4 overs)

Perth Scorchers won by 4 wickets
Etihad Stadium
Attendance: 26,112
Umpires: Greg Davidson and Mick Martell
Player of the match: Michael Klinger (Scorchers)

- Perth Scorchers won the toss and elected to field.

30 December
18:10 (D/N)
Scorecard

Hobart Hurricanes; 9/173 (20 overs)	v	Brisbane Heat (H); 3/174 (16.2 overs)
Daniel Christian 33 (23); Jack Wildermuth 2/26 (3 overs)		Chris Lynn 84* (50); Stuart Broad 1/24 (3 overs)

Brisbane Heat won by 7 wickets
The Gabba
Attendance: 34,601
Umpires: John Ward and Paul Wilson
Player of the match: Chris Lynn (Heat)

- Brisbane Heat won the toss and elected to field.

31 December
18:40 (D/N)
Scorecard

(H) Adelaide Strikers; 9/152 (20 overs)	v	Sydney Sixers; 104 (18.2 overs)
Ben Dunk 37 (20); Sean Abbott 5/16 (4 overs)		Sam Billings 40 (30); Billy Stanlake 3/17 (3.2 overs)

Adelaide Strikers won by 48 runs
Adelaide Oval
Attendance: 45,471
Umpires: Ashley Barrow and Greg Davidson
Player of the match: Sean Abbott (Sixers)

- Sydney Sixers won the toss and elected to field.
- Tom Andrews (Strikers) made his T20 debut.

1 January
18:10 (D/N)
Scorecard

Melbourne Renegades; 4/171 (20 overs)	v	Melbourne Stars (H); 9/151 (18 overs)
Cameron White 64* (43); James Faulkner 1/19 (4 overs)		Luke Wright 45 (40); Brad Hogg 3/22 (4 overs)

Melbourne Renegades won by 7 runs (D/L)
Melbourne Cricket Ground
Attendance: 71,162
Umpires: Shawn Craig and Geoff Joshua
Player of the match: Brad Hogg (Renegades)

- Melbourne Stars won the toss and elected to field.
- Rain reduced the Stars innings to 18 overs with a revised target of 159.

1 January
18:15 (D/N)
Scorecard

(H) Perth Scorchers; 4/177 (20 overs)	v	Sydney Thunder; 8/127 (20 overs)
Ian Bell 45 (38); Shane Watson 1/18 (2 overs)		Pat Cummins 39 (26); David Willey 2/21 (4 overs)

Perth Scorchers won by 50 runs
#TheFurnace
Attendance: 20,220
Umpires: Gerard Abood and Michael Graham-Smith
Player of the match: Mitchell Marsh (Scorchers)

- Sydney Thunder won the toss and elected to field.
- Jay Lenton (Thunder) made his T20 debut.

2 January
19:10 (D/N)
Scorecard

Adelaide Strikers; 143 (20 overs)	v	Hobart Hurricanes (H); 2/144 (17.4 overs)
Brad Hodge 55 (45); Daniel Christian 5/14 (4 overs)		D'Arcy Short 60 (39); Billy Stanlake 1/17 (4 overs)

Hobart Hurricanes won by 8 wickets
Blundstone Arena
Attendance: 16,815
Umpires: Phillip Gillespie and John Ward
Player of the match: Daniel Christian (Hurricanes)

- Hobart Hurricanes won the toss and elected to field.
- Beau Webster (Hurricanes) made his T20 debut.

3 January
18:10 (D/N)
Scorecard

(H) Brisbane Heat; 6/186 (20 overs)	v	Sydney Sixers; 7/191 (19.4 overs)
Joe Burns 51* (33); Sean Abbott 3/38 (4 overs)		Daniel Hughes 85 (55); Mitchell Swepson 2/25 (4 overs)

Sydney Sixers won by 3 wickets
The Gabba
Attendance: 32,371
Umpires: Ashley Barrow and Mick Martell
Player of the match: Daniel Hughes (Sixers)

- Sydney Sixers won the toss and elected to field.
- Henry Thornton (Sixers) made his T20 debut.

4 January
19:10 (D/N)
Scorecard

Melbourne Stars; 8/166 (20 overs)	v	Sydney Thunder (H); 4/168 (20 overs)
Kevin Pietersen 60 (37); Shane Watson 3/23 (4 overs)		Eoin Morgan 71* (50); Ben Hilfenhaus 2/39 (4 overs)

Sydney Thunder won by 6 wickets
Spotless Stadium
Attendance: 20,076
Umpires: Gerard Abood and Simon Fry
Player of the match: Eoin Morgan (Thunder)

- Sydney Thunder won the toss and elected to field.

5 January
16:10
Scorecard

(H) Perth Scorchers; 6/173 (20 overs)	v	Brisbane Heat; 1/174 (14.4 overs)
Mitchell Marsh 70 (41); Mitchell Swepson 2/27 (4 overs)		Chris Lynn 98* (49); David Willey 1/30 (2 overs)

Brisbane Heat won by 9 wickets
#TheFurnace
Attendance: 20,446
Umpires: Phillip Gillespie and John Ward
Player of the match: Chris Lynn (Heat)

- Perth Scorchers won the toss and elected to bat.
- Chris Lynn equaled the record for the most number of sixes hit a BBL innings (11).

6 January
18:40 (D/N)
Scorecard

Hobart Hurricanes; 8/161 (20 overs)	v	Adelaide Strikers (H); 5/164 (18.2 overs)
Beau Webster 67* (43); Chris Jordan 3/24 (4 overs)		Ben Dunk 79* (49); Daniel Christian 2/24 (4 overs)

Adelaide Strikers won by 5 wickets
Adelaide Oval
Attendance: 39,229
Umpires: Simon Fry and Michael Graham-Smith
Player of the match: Ben Dunk (Strikers)

- Adelaide Strikers won the toss and elected to field.

7 January
19:10 (D/N)
Scorecard

Melbourne Stars; 7/200 (20 overs)	v	Melbourne Renegades (H); 9/154 (20 overs)
Kevin Pietersen 73 (46); James Pattinson 3/44 (4 overs)		Cameron White 38 (29); Adam Zampa 3/19 (4 overs)

Melbourne Stars won by 46 runs
Etihad Stadium
Attendance: 44,189
Umpires: Geoff Joshua and Sam Nogajski
Player of the match: Adam Zampa (Stars)

- Melbourne Renegades won the toss and elected to field.
- The crowd of 44,189 is the highest ever for a cricket match at Etihad Stadium.

8 January
19:10 (D/N)
Scorecard

(H) Hobart Hurricanes; 8/161 (20 overs)	v	Sydney Thunder; 4/162 (16.5 overs)
George Bailey 69* (54); Carlos Brathwaite 2/31 (3 overs)		Shane Watson 55 (31); Cameron Boyce 2/28 (3.5 overs)

Sydney Thunder won by 6 wickets
Blundstone Arena
Attendance: 17,939
Umpires: Greg Davidson and Mick Martell
Player of the match: Shane Watson (Thunder)

- Sydney Thunder won the toss and elected to field.

9 January
19:40 (D/N)
Scorecard

Melbourne Renegades; 6/170 (20 overs)	v	Sydney Sixers (H); 4/171 (19.3 overs)
Aaron Finch 57 (44); Ben Dwarshuis 3/35 (4 overs)		Daniel Hughes 41 (29); Thisara Perera 2/26 (4 overs)

Sydney Sixers won by 6 wickets
Sydney Cricket Ground
Attendance: 30,702
Umpires: Shawn Craig and Tony Wilds
Player of the match: Brad Haddin (Sixers)

- Melbourne Renegades won the toss and elected to bat.
- The crowd of 30,702 is the highest crowd for a non-derby BBL match at the SCG.

10 January
19:40 (D/N)
Scorecard

Adelaide Strikers; 8/152 (20 overs)	v	Melbourne Stars (H); 8/153 (19.3 overs)
Ben Dunk 35 (25); Scott Boland 4/30 (4 overs)		Ben Hilfenhaus 32* (24); Ben Laughlin 3/19 (4 overs)

Melbourne Stars won by 2 wickets
Melbourne Cricket Ground
Attendance: 40,254
Umpires: John Ward and Paul Wilson
Player of the match: Ben Hilfenhaus (Stars)

- Melbourne Stars won the toss and elected to field.
- Liam Bowe (Stars) and Wes Agar (Strikers) both made their T20 debuts.

11 January
18:40 (D/N)
Scorecard

Perth Scorchers; 5/156 (20 overs)	v	Brisbane Heat (H); 129 (19.2 overs)
Michael Klinger 81 (54); Mitchell Swepson 2/22 (4 overs)		Alex Ross 39 (40); Andrew Tye 4/22 (3.2 overs)

Perth Scorchers won by 27 runs
The Gabba
Attendance: 34,677
Umpires: Simon Fry and Michael Graham-Smith
Player of the match: Michael Klinger (Scorchers)

- Brisbane Heat won the toss and elected to field.
- Andrew Tye (Scorchers) took a hat-trick.

12 January
19:40 (D/N)
Scorecard

(H) Melbourne Renegades; 4/222 (20 overs)	v	Hobart Hurricanes; 8/223 (20 overs)
Aaron Finch 63 (40); Jake Reed 2/54 (4 overs)		Ben McDermott 114 (52); Sunil Narine 3/27 (4 overs)

Hobart Hurricanes won by 2 wickets
Etihad Stadium
Attendance: 26,816
Umpires: Phillip Gillespie and Paul Wilson
Player of the match: Ben McDermott (Hurricanes)

- Hobart Hurricanes won the toss and elected to field.
- The Renegades score of 222 was the highest ever score in BBL history. This was then surpassed by the Hurricanes in the second innings.
- The combined total of 445 runs, including a record 58 boundaries, is the highest ever in a BBL match.
- Ben McDermott scored the second-highest individual BBL score, as well as the third-fastest BBL century (47 balls).
- The crowd of 26,816 is the highest crowd for a non-derby BBL match at Etihad Stadium.

14 January
18:10 (D/N)
Scorecard

(H) Sydney Sixers; 9/99 (20 overs)	v	Sydney Thunder; 2/100 (10 overs)
Daniel Hughes 20 (19); Fawad Ahmed 4/14 (4 overs)		Kurtis Patterson 38* (26); Sean Abbott 2/36 (4 overs)

Sydney Thunder won by 8 wickets
Sydney Cricket Ground
Attendance: 39,756
Umpires: Ashley Barrow and Greg Davidson
Player of the match: Fawad Ahmed (Thunder)

- Sydney Sixers won the toss and elected to bat.
- The crowd of 39,756 is the highest crowd for any domestic match in New South Wales.

14 January
18:15 (D/N)
Scorecard

(H) Perth Scorchers; 7/134 (20 overs)	v	Melbourne Stars; 3/137 (17.2 overs)
Andrew Tye 42 (33); Michael Beer 2/12 (4 overs)		Kevin Pietersen 44* (42); Jhye Richardson 2/26 (3 overs)

Melbourne Stars won by 7 wickets
#TheFurnace
Attendance: 21,171
Umpires: Geoff Joshua and Damien Mealey
Player of the match: Michael Beer (Stars)

- Perth Scorchers won the toss and elected to bat.

16 January
19:10 (D/N)
Scorecard

Melbourne Renegades; 9/171 (20 overs)	v	Adelaide Strikers (H); 8/165 (20 overs)
Marcus Harris 85 (53); Kieron Pollard 3/30 (3 overs)		Ben Dunk 32 (25); Thisara Perera 4/25 (3 overs)

Melbourne Renegades won by 6 runs
Adelaide Oval
Attendance: 42,388
Umpires: John Ward and Tony Wilds
Player of the match: Marcus Harris (Renegades)

- Adelaide Strikers won the toss and elected to field.

17 January
19:40 (D/N)
Scorecard

(H) Melbourne Stars; 7/138 (20 overs)	v	Brisbane Heat; 3/139 (18.1 overs)
Luke Wright 60* (55); Mitchell Swepson 2/14 (4 overs)		Alex Ross 46* (40); Evan Gulbis 1/8 (1 over)

Brisbane Heat won by 7 wickets
Melbourne Cricket Ground
Attendance: 40,225
Umpires: Gerard Abood and Michael Graham-Smith
Player of the match: Mitchell Swepson (Heat)

- Melbourne Stars won the toss and elected to bat.
- Marnus Labuschagne (Heat) made his T20 debut.

18 January
19:40 (D/N)
Scorecard

Adelaide Strikers; 5/178 (20 overs)	v	Sydney Thunder (H); 101 (15.3 overs)
Ben Dunk 65 (40); Shane Watson 2/42 (4 overs)		Shane Watson 39 (26); Ish Sodhi 6/11 (3.3 overs)

Adelaide Strikers won by 77 runs
Spotless Stadium
Attendance: 20,642
Umpires: Ashley Barrow and Mick Martell
Player of the match: Ish Sodhi (Strikers)

- Sydney Thunder won the toss and elected to field.
- Alex Carey (Strikers) made his T20 debut.

20 January
18:40 (D/N)
Scorecard

Melbourne Renegades; 5/199 (20 overs)	v	Brisbane Heat (H); 198 (19.5 overs)
Aaron Finch 71 (35); Mark Steketee 2/37 (4 overs)		Brendon McCullum 64 (40); Thisara Perera 2/27 (4 overs)

Melbourne Renegades won by 1 run
The Gabba
Attendance: 35,112
Umpires: Shawn Craig and Sam Nogajski
Player of the match: Aaron Finch (Renegades)

- Brisbane Heat won the toss and elected to field.
- Andrew Harriott (Renegades) made his T20 debut.

21 January
16:20
Scorecard

(H) Hobart Hurricanes; 6/134 (20 overs)	v	Perth Scorchers; 3/135 (13.5 overs)
D'Arcy Short 36 (24); Mitchell Johnson 2/15 (4 overs)		Shaun Marsh 57 (34); Clive Rose 1/28 (4 overs)

Perth Scorchers won by 7 wickets
Blundstone Arena
Attendance: 17,445
Umpires: Gerard Abood and Michael Graham-Smith
Player of the match: Shaun Marsh (Scorchers)

- Perth Scorchers won the toss and elected to field.

21 January
19:25 (D/N)
Scorecard

(H) Melbourne Stars; 8/156 (20 overs)	v	Sydney Sixers; 7/160 (19 overs)
Luke Wright 62 (47); Ben Dwarshuis 3/25 (4 overs)		Daniel Hughes 34 (33); Scott Boland 3/37 (4 overs)

Sydney Sixers won by 3 wickets
Melbourne Cricket Ground
Attendance: 46,671
Umpires: Ashley Barrow and Greg Davidson
Player of the match: Sean Abbott (Sixers)

- Sydney Sixers won the toss and elected to field.

== Play-offs ==
Semifinals
4	Melbourne Stars	8/136 (20 ov)
1	Perth Scorchers (H)	3/139 (16.5 ov)
2	Brisbane Heat (H)	9/167 (20 ov)
3	Sydney Sixers	8/167 (20 ov)

Final
3	Sydney Sixers	9/141 (20 ov)
1	Perth Scorchers (H)	1/144 (15.5 ov)

=== Semi-final 1 ===
Semi-final 1
24 January
16:40
Scorecard

Melbourne Stars; 8/136 (20 overs)	v	Perth Scorchers (H); 3/139 (16.5 overs)
Seb Gotch 48 (47); Mitchell Johnson 3/3 (4 overs)		Shaun Marsh 56* (44); Evan Gulbis 1/9 (1 over)

Perth Scorchers won by 7 wickets
#TheFurnace
Attendance: 19,977
Umpires: Shawn Craig and Sam Nogajski
Player of the match: Mitchell Johnson (Scorchers)

- Perth Scorchers won the toss and elected to field.
- Mitchell Johnson's figures of 3/3 is the most economical completed spell in BBL history.

=== Semi-final 2 ===
Semi-final 2
25 January
18:40 (D/N)
Scorecard

(H) Brisbane Heat; 9/167 (20 overs)	v	Sydney Sixers; 8/167 (20 overs)
Brendon McCullum 46 (27); Nathan Lyon 4/23 (4 overs)		Moises Henriques 64 (34); Mark Steketee 2/21 (4 overs)

Sydney Sixers won in the Super Over
The Gabba
Attendance: 35,116
Umpires: Gerard Abood and Geoff Joshua
Player of the match: Moises Henriques (Sixers)

- Sydney Sixers won the toss and elected to field.
- The crowd of 35,116 is the highest ever for a BBL match at the Gabba.

=== Final ===
Final
28 January
16:15
Scorecard

Sydney Sixers; 9/141 (20 overs)	v	Perth Scorchers (H); 1/144 (15.5 overs)
Brad Haddin 38 (25); Jhye Richardson 3/30 (4 overs)		Michael Klinger 71* (49); Nathan Lyon 1/28 (4 overs)

Perth Scorchers won by 9 wickets
#TheFurnace
Attendance: 21,832
Umpires: Mick Martell and Paul Wilson
Player of the match: Jhye Richardson (Scorchers)

- Perth Scorchers won the toss and elected to field.
- The crowd of 21,832 was the highest ever for a BBL match at the WACA.

== Statistics ==
Most runs
Player	Team	Runs
Ben Dunk	Adelaide Strikers	364
Aaron Finch	Melbourne Renegades	354
Michael Klinger	Perth Scorchers	334
Brendon McCullum	Brisbane Heat	323
Chris Lynn	Brisbane Heat	309

- Source: ESPNcricinfo

Most wickets
Player	Team	Wickets
Sean Abbott	Sydney Sixers	20
Mark Steketee	Brisbane Heat	15
Scott Boland	Melbourne Stars	14
Three players		13

- Source: ESPNcricinfo

== TV audience ==
BBL games are currently broadcast in Australia by the free-to-air Network Ten.

Following are the television ratings for 2016–17 BBL season in Australia.

The Super Over of the second semi final match drew ratings of 1,720,000 nationally, and 1,250,000 in the 5 metro cities.

Match No	Teams	Average TV Ratings			
Match No	Teams	National		5 metro cities	
Match No	Teams	Session 1	Session 2	Session 1	Session 2
1	Sydney Thunder vs Sydney Sixers	1,220,000	1,150,000	834,000	805,000
2	Adelaide Strikers vs Brisbane Heat	1,220,000	1,430,000	865,000	1,040,000
3	Melbourne Renegades vs Sydney Thunder	1,150,000	1,180,000	759,000	798,000
4	Sydney Sixers vs Hobart Hurricanes	698,000	1,100,000	475,000	717,000
5	Perth Scorchers vs Adelaide Strikers	1,060,000	707,000	747,000	531,000
6	Hobart Hurricanes vs Melbourne Stars	805,000	1,040,000	542,000	709,000
7	Sydney Sixers vs Perth Scorchers	905,000	1,130,000	638,000	803,000
8	Sydney Thunder vs Brisbane Heat	799,000	1,160,000	542,000	796,000
9	Melbourne Renegades vs Perth Scorchers	932,000	1,290,000	650,000	880,000
10	Brisbane Heat vs Hobart Hurricanes	803,000	1,170,000	550,000	773,000
11	Adelaide Strikers vs Sydney Sixers	723,000	858,000	471,000	580,000
12	Melbourne Stars vs Melbourne Renegades	925,000	1,270,000	608,000	868,000
13	Perth Scorchers vs Sydney Thunder	1,030,000	613,000	686,000	449,000
14	Hobart Hurricanes vs Adelaide Strikers	968,000	1,130,000	636,000	754,000
15	Brisbane Heat vs Sydney Sixers	972,000	1,190,000	632,000	794,000
16	Sydney Thunder vs Melbourne Stars	943,000	1,140,000	618,000	756,000
17	Perth Scorchers vs Brisbane Heat	896,000	1,330,000	572,000	906,000
18	Adelaide Strikers vs Hobart Hurricanes	752,000	1,070,000	511,000	737,000
19	Melbourne Renegades vs Melbourne Stars	947,000	1,150,000	625,000	784,000
20	Hobart Hurricanes vs Sydney Thunder	1,010,000	1,200,000	665,000	806,000
21	Sydney Sixers vs Melbourne Renegades	1,040,000	1,130,000	709,000	808,000
22	Melbourne Stars vs Adelaide Strikers	1,120,000	1,260,000	774,000	907,000
23	Brisbane Heat vs Perth Scorchers	1,230,000	1,270,000	823,000	886,000
24	Melbourne Renegades vs Hobart Hurricanes	1,160,000	1,280,000	794,000	907,000
25	Sydney Sixers vs Sydney Thunder	703,000	1,000,000	476,000	662,000
26	Perth Scorchers vs Melbourne Stars	1,040,000	823,000	736,000	628,000
27	Adelaide Strikers vs Melbourne Renegades	1,000,000	1,100,000	692,000	768,000
28	Melbourne Stars vs Brisbane Heat	1,090,000	1,140,000	755,000	814,000
29	Sydney Thunder vs Adelaide Strikers	901,000	946,000	617,000	674,000
30	Brisbane Heat vs Melbourne Renegades	1,050,000	1,290,000	716,000	906,000
31	Hobart Hurricanes vs Perth Scorchers	462,000	657,000	315,000	444,000
32	Melbourne Stars vs Sydney Sixers	1,004,000	1,110,000	683,000	788,000
SF1	Perth Scorchers vs Melbourne Stars	1,190,000	1,290,000	821,000	913,000
SF2	Brisbane Heat vs Sydney Sixers	1,200,000	1,390,000	833,000	987,000
Final	Perth Scorchers vs Sydney Sixers	1,190,000	1,480,000	834,000	1,030,000
