= Hobart Hurricanes =

Men's cricket franchise based in Tasmania

- Nickname: Hurricanes
- League: Big Bash League
- Association: Cricket Australia

Personnel
- Captain: Nathan Ellis
- Coach: Jeff Vaughan
- Owner: Cricket Tasmania

Team information
- City: Hobart, Tasmania
- Colours: Purple
- Founded: 2011; 15 years ago
- Home ground: Bellerive Oval
- Capacity: 19,500

History
- Big Bash League wins: 1 (BBL |14)
- Official website: hobarthurricanes.com.au
T20 kit

Hobart Hurricanes are an Australian men's professional Twenty20 (T20) franchise cricket team based in Hobart, Tasmania. They compete in Australia's domestic Big Bash League (BBL) competition. The Hurricanes play the majority of their home matches at Bellerive Oval in Hobart, with additional home matches at the University of Tasmania Stadium in Launceston and at Traeger Park in Alice Springs, Northern Territory. The Hurricanes wear a purple cricket uniform.

== History ==
=== Inaugural season ===
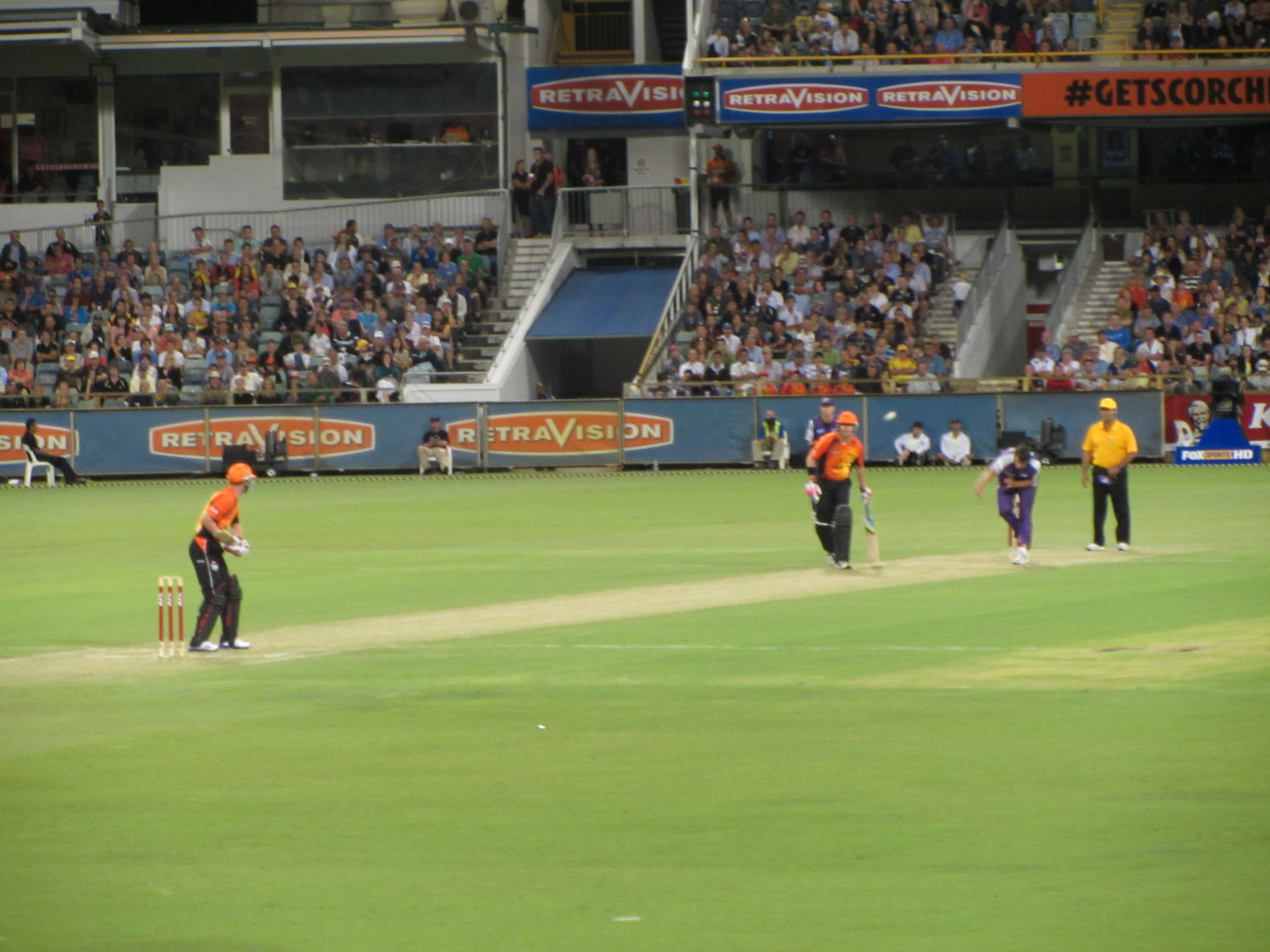
Perth Scorchers taking on Hobart Hurricanes at the WACA Ground in 2011

The Hobart Hurricanes' inaugural coach was Allister de Winter and their inaugural captain was Tim Paine.

The Hobart Hurricanes made a great start to the inaugural Big Bash League season in 2011/12, winning their first game at the WACA Ground against the Perth Scorchers, making 140 before bowling out the Scorchers for 109, with the performance of fast bowler Ben Hilfenhaus resulting in his selection for the annual Boxing Day Test at the Melbourne Cricket Ground. In the Hurricanes' second match they faced fancied favorites Sydney Sixers before inflicting a 42-run defeat on the Sixers at Bellerive Oval in Hobart. Rana Naved-ul-Hasan was the leading wicket taker in Big Bash League 2011–12, taking 15 wickets for the Hurricanes.

=== 2012/13–2023/24 seasons ===
The Hurricanes played a total of 8 games in the 2012–13 Big Bash League. They ended up losing 4 and winning the same number of games. They finished the tournament in 6th position out of 8 teams. The Hurricanes qualified for the semi-finals in 2013–14 Big Bash by just 1 point ahead of Brisbane Heat. They won the semi-final against the Stars. They were outclassed by Perth Scorchers in the final by 39 runs. They finished as the runners-up. Ben Dunk was named the Man of the Tournament with 395 runs and Jonathan Wells was the young gun of the tournament. They only won 3 games in the 2014–15 season and ended up 5th on the table.

In July 2018, they were one of the six teams invited to play in the first edition of the Abu Dhabi T20 Trophy, scheduled to start in October 2018. The 2018-19 season would also be the first time that the team finished a season on top of the ladder, though they would lose in the semi-finals against the Melbourne Renegades.

=== 2024–2025 season ===
The 2024-2025 season of the Big Bash League was the team's most successful season, reaching the top of the ladder in the competition for the first time since the 2018-19 season. The team would then go on to win the Big Bash Title against the Sydney Thunder by 7 wickets, largely thanks to Mitchell Owen's batting performance, who set the record for the fastest 50 runs in a Big Bash Final and tied the record of fastest century in the Big Bash League with Craig Simmons.

== Season summaries ==
Chart of yearly table positions for Hobart Hurricanes in BBL

Season	W–L	Pos.	Finals	Coach	Captain	Most Runs	Most Wickets	Most Valuable Player	Refs
2011–12	5–2	2nd	SF	Allister de Winter	Tim Paine (Note: Xavier Doherty stood in as captain for all eight games.)	Travis Birt – 345*	Rana Naved-ul-Hasan – 15*	–	
2012–13	4–4	6th	DNQ	Allister de Winter	George Bailey (Note: Tim Paine stood in as captain for one game.)	Tim Paine – 260	Ben Laughlin – 14*	–	
2013–14	3–4	4th	RU	Damien Wright	George Bailey (Note: Tim Paine stood in as captain for seven games.)	Ben Dunk – 395*	Ben Laughlin – 14	–	
2014–15	3–5	5th	DNQ	Damien Wright	George Bailey (Note: Tim Paine stood in as captain for one game.)	Ben Dunk – 175	Cameron Boyce – 10	–	
2015–16	3–5	7th	DNQ	Damien Wright	Tim Paine	George Bailey – 240	Cameron Boyce – 11	Dan Christian	
2016–17	3–5	7th	DNQ	Damien Wright	Tim Paine	George Bailey – 247	Dan Christian – 9	Stuart Broad	
2017–18	5–5	4th	RU	Gary Kirsten	George Bailey	D'Arcy Short – 572*	Jofra Archer – 16	D'Arcy Short	
2018–19	10–4*	1st*	SF	Adam Griffith	Matthew Wade	D'Arcy Short – 572*	Jofra Archer – 18 (Note: James Faulkner also took 18 wickets but at a higher economy rate.)	D'Arcy Short	
2019–20	6–7	4th	EF	Adam Griffith	Matthew Wade (Note: Ben McDermott stood in as captain for six games.)	D'Arcy Short – 357	Scott Boland – 15	D'Arcy Short	
2020–21	7–7	6th	DNQ	Adam Griffith	Matthew Wade (Note: Peter Handscomb stood in as captain for 11 games.)	Ben McDermott – 402	Nathan Ellis – 20	Scott Boland	
2021–22	7–7	5th	EF	Adam Griffith	Matthew Wade (Note: Peter Handscomb stood in as captain for two games.)	Ben McDermott – 577*	Tom Rogers – 20	Ben McDermott	
2022–23	6–8	6th	DNQ	Jeff Vaughan	Matthew Wade (Note: Nathan Ellis stood in as captain for two games.)	Tim David – 354	Riley Meredith – 21	Nathan Ellis	
2023–24	4–6	5th	DNQ	Jeff Vaughan	Nathan Ellis	Ben McDermott – 261	Nathan Ellis – 12	Chris Jordan	
2024–25	7–2*	1st*	C	Jeff Vaughan	Nathan Ellis (Note: Ben McDermott stood in as captain for one game.)	Mitchell Owen – 452*	Riley Meredith – 16	Mitchell Owen	
2025–26	6–3	3rd	CF	Jeff Vaughan	Nathan Ellis (Note: Ben McDermott stood in as captain for three games.)	Ben McDermott – 322	Rishad Hossain – 15	Rishad Hossain	

Legend
DNQ	Did not qualify	SF	Semi-finalists	*	Led the league
EF	Lost the Eliminator	RU	Runners-up	^	League record
KF	Lost the Knockout	CF	Lost the Challenger	C	Champions

== Captaincy records ==
There have been seven captains in the Hurricanes' history, including matches featuring an acting captain.

Captain	Span	M	Won	Lost	Tied	NR	W–L%
Xavier Doherty	2011–12	8	5	3	0	0	62.5
George Bailey	2012–18	29	14	14	0	1	50
Tim Paine	2013–17	30	12	18	0	0	40
Matthew Wade	2018–23	52	24	27	0	1	47.06
Ben McDermott	2019–26	10	5	4	0	1	55.56
Peter Handscomb	2020–22	13	7	6	0	0	53.85
Nathan Ellis	2022–26	32	20	11	0	1	64.52

== Home grounds ==
Venue	Games hosted by season															
Venue	01	02	03	04	05	06	07	08	09	10	11	12	13	14	15	Total
Ninja Stadium	5	4	4	4	4	4	4	6	5	3	4	5	4	5	6	67
TIO Traeger Park	0	0	0	0	0	0	0	0	1	0	0	0	0	0	0	1
University of Tasmania Stadium	0	0	0	0	0	0	1	2	2	1	1	2	1	0	0	10

== Current squad ==
The squad of the Hobart Hurricanes for the 2026–27 Big Bash League season as of 15 October 2026.

- Players with international caps are listed in **bold**.

No.	Name	Nat.	Birth Date	Batting Style	Bowling Style	Additional Info.
Batters
8	**Tim David**	Australia	16 March 1996 (age 30)	Right-handed	Right-arm off spin	
32	Nick Hobson	Australia	22 August 1994 (age 32)	Left-handed	Right-arm medium	
61	Tim Ward	Australia	16 February 1998 (age 28)	Left-handed	Right-arm off spin	
11	**Jake Weatherald**	Australia	4 November 1994 (age 32)	Left-handed	Right-arm leg spin	
All Rounders
4	**Nikhil Chaudhary**	Australia	4 May 1996 (age 30)	Right-handed	Right-arm leg spin	
16	**Mitchell Owen**	Australia	16 September 2001 (age 25)	Right-handed	Right-arm medium	
20	**Beau Webster**	Australia	1 December 1993 (age 32)	Right-handed	Right-arm medium	
Wicket-keepers
47	**Shai Hope**	West Indies	10 November 1993 (age 33)	Right-handed	—N/a	International Signing
28	**Ben McDermott**	Australia	12 December 1994 (age 31)	Right-handed	—N/a	
Bowlers
7	Marcus Bean	Australia	5 January 2004 (age 22)	Left-handed	Left-arm medium-fast	
35	Iain Carlisle	Australia	5 January 2000 (age 26)	Left-handed	Right-arm medium	
72	**Nathan Ellis**	Australia	22 September 1994 (age 32)	Right-handed	Right-arm medium	Captain
2	**Rishad Hossain**	Bangladesh	15 July 2002 (age 24)	Right-handed	Right-arm leg spin	International Signing
21	**Riley Meredith**	Australia	21 June 1996 (age 30)	Right-handed	Right-arm fast	
80	Will Prestwidge	Australia	15 January 2002 (age 24)	Left-handed	Right-arm fast	
37	**Billy Stanlake**	Australia	4 November 1994 (age 32)	Left-handed	Right-arm fast	
88	**Adam Zampa**	Australia	31 March 1992 (age 34)	Right-handed	Right-arm leg spin	

== Players ==
=== Australian representatives ===
(Australia) The following is a list of cricketers who have played for the Hurricanes after making their debut in the national men's team (the period they spent as both a Hurricanes squad member and an Australian-capped player is in brackets):

- Travis Birt (BBL|01–04)
- Mark Cosgrove (BBL|01)
- Xavier Doherty (BBL|01–04)
- Ben Hilfenhaus (BBL|01–04)
- Phil Jaques (BBL|01)
- Jason Krejza (BBL|01–02)
- Ben Laughlin (BBL|01–03)
- Ricky Ponting (BBL|01–02)
- George Bailey (BBL|02–09)
- Doug Bollinger (BBL|02–03)
- Tim Paine (BBL|02–08, 12)
- Cameron Boyce (BBL|04–07)
- Ben Dunk (BBL|04–05)
- Dan Christian (BBL|05–07)
- Shaun Tait (BBL|05–06)
- Alex Doolan (BBL|07–08)
- Nathan Reardon (BBL|07)
- D'Arcy Short (BBL|07–12)
- Matthew Wade (BBL|07–16)
- James Faulkner (BBL|08–10)
- Ben McDermott (BBL|06–16)
- Scott Boland (BBL|09–11)
- Peter Handscomb (BBL|10–11)
- Nathan Ellis (BBL|11–16)
- Riley Meredith (BBL|11–16)
- Joel Paris (BBL|11–12)
- Tim David (BBL|12–16)
- Jake Weatherald (BBL|15–16)
- Beau Webster (BBL|15–16)
- Nikhil Chaudhary (BBL|16)
- Adam Zampa (BBL|16)

=== Overseas marquees ===
- (Pakistan) Rana Naved-ul-Hasan (BBL|01)
- (England) Owais Shah (BBL|01–03)
- (New Zealand) Scott Styris (BBL|02)
- (Pakistan) Shoaib Malik (BBL|03–04)
- (England) Tim Bresnan (BBL|04)
- (England) Alex Hales (BBL|04)
- (Cricket West Indies) Daren Sammy (BBL|04–05)
- (Sri Lanka) Kumar Sangakkara (BBL|05–06)
- (England) Stuart Broad (BBL|06)
- (England) Jofra Archer (BBL|07–08)
- (England) Tymal Mills (BBL|07)
- (Afghanistan) Qais Ahmad (BBL|08–09)
- (South Africa) Johan Botha (BBL|08-10)
- (South Africa) David Miller (BBL|09)
- (South Africa) Colin Ingram (BBL|10)
- (England) Will Jacks (BBL|10)
- (Nepal) Sandeep Lamichhane (BBL|10–11)
- (England) Dawid Malan (BBL|10)
- (Cricket West Indies) Keemo Paul (BBL|10)
- (England) Harry Brook (BBL|11)
- (England) Jordan Cox (BBL|11)
- (England) Tom Lammonby (BBL|11)
- (England) Jordan Thompson (BBL|11)
- (Pakistan) Faheem Ashraf (BBL|12)
- (Pakistan) Asif Ali (BBL|12)
- (England) Zak Crawley (BBL|12)
- (Pakistan) Shadab Khan (BBL|12)
- (New Zealand) James Neesham (BBL|12)
- (United States) Corey Anderson (BBL|13)
- (England) Sam Hain (BBL|13)
- (England) Chris Jordan (BBL|13–15)
- (Cricket West Indies) Shai Hope (BBL|14, 16)
- (Afghanistan) Waqar Salamkheil (BBL|14)
- (England) Rehan Ahmed (BBL|15)
- (Bangladesh) Rishad Hossain (BBL|15–16)

== Administration and support staff ==
Position	Name
Head Coach	(Australia) Jeff Vaughan
Batting Coach	(Australia) Jimmy Adams
Bowling Coach	(Australia) Shawn Bradstreet
Head of Strategy	(Australia) Ricky Ponting
General Manager	(Australia) Salliann Beams

== Honours ==
- Champions: 1 – BBL|14
- Runners-up: 2 – BBL|03, BBL|07
- Minor Premiers: 2 – BBL|08, BBL|14
- Finals series appearances: 7 – BBL|01, BBL|03, BBL|07, BBL|08, BBL|09, BBL|11, BBL|14, BBL|15
- Wooden Spoons: 0

== Statistics and awards ==
As of 13 September 2026

=== Team stats ===
- Win–loss record:

Big Bash League:

Opposition	M	Won	Lost	Tied	NR	W–L%
Adelaide Strikers	26	11	14	0	1	44
Brisbane Heat	25	14	11	0	0	56
Melbourne Renegades	23	14	9	0	0	60.87
Melbourne Stars	24	9	15	0	0	37.5
Perth Scorchers	23	9	14	0	0	39.13
Sydney Sixers	22	10	10	0	2	50
Sydney Thunder	25	16	8	0	1	66.67
Total	169	84	81	0	4	50.91

Champions League Twenty20:

Opposition	M	Won	Lost	Tied	NR	W–L%
Barbados Tridents	1	1	0	0	0	100
Cape Cobras	1	1	0	0	0	100
Kolkata Knight Riders	1	0	1	0	0	0
Northern Knights	1	1	0	0	0	100
Kings XI Punjab	1	0	1	0	0	0
Total	5	3	2	0	0	60

- Highest score in an innings: 4/229 (20 overs) vs Adelaide Strikers, 5 January 2023
- Highest successful chase: 8/223 (20 overs) vs Melbourne Renegades, 12 January 2017
- Lowest successful defence: 9/120 (20 overs) vs Brisbane Heat, 25 January 2023
- Largest victory:
  - Batting first: 85 runs vs Melbourne Renegades, 29 December 2021
  - Batting second: 37 balls remaining vs Melbourne Renegades, 21 December 2025
- Longest winning streak: 7 matches (21 December 2024 – 16 January 2025)
- Longest losing streak: 4 matches, twice (4 – 13 January 2016 and 9 – 19 January 2020)

=== Individual stats ===
- Most runs: Ben McDermott – 3,065
- Highest score in an innings: Matthew Wade – 130* (61) vs Adelaide Strikers, 26 January 2020
- Highest partnership: D'Arcy Short and Matthew Wade – 203 vs Adelaide Strikers, 26 January 2020
- Most wickets: Riley Meredith – 117
- Best bowling figures in an innings: Dan Christian – 5/14 (4 overs) vs Adelaide Strikers, 2 January 2017
- Hat-tricks taken:
  - Xavier Doherty vs Sydney Thunder, 23 December 2012
  - Nathan Ellis vs Sydney Thunder, 15 January 2023
- Most catches (fielder): D'Arcy Short – 38
- Most dismissals (wicket-keeper): Matthew Wade – 47 (41 catches, 6 stumpings)

=== Individual awards ===
- Player of the Match:
  - D'Arcy Short – 12
  - Matthew Wade – 8
  - Ben McDermott and Nathan Ellis – 7
  - Riley Meredith – 5
  - Tim David and Ben Dunk – 4
  - Chris Jordan – 3
  - Travis Birt, Dan Christian, Caleb Jewell, Mitchell Owen, Tim Paine, and Ricky Ponting – 2
  - Qais Ahmad, George Bailey, Scott Boland, Cameron Boyce, Nikhil Chaudhary, Xavier Doherty, Paddy Dooley, Sam Hain, Ben Hilfenhaus, Rana Naved-ul-Hasan, Jake Reed, Daren Sammy, Owais Shah, Shaun Tait, Beau Webster and Mac Wright – 1
- BBL Player of the Final:
  - Mitchell Owen – BBL|14
- BBL Player of the Tournament:
  - D'Arcy Short (2) – BBL|07, BBL|08
  - Ben Dunk – BBL|03
  - Ben McDermott – BBL|11
- BBL Team of the Tournament:
  - D'Arcy Short (2) – BBL|07, BBL|08
  - Matthew Wade (2) – BBL|08, BBL|09
  - Ben McDermott (2) – BBL|10, BBL|11
  - Tim David (2) – BBL|12, BBL|14
  - Tim Paine – BBL|05
  - Shaun Tait – BBL|05
  - Jofra Archer – BBL|07
  - George Bailey – BBL|08
  - Paddy Dooley – BBL|12
  - Mitchell Owen – BBL|14

== Team song ==
The Hurricanes were the first BBL franchise to have their own team song, the lyrics of which were written by Tim Paine performed to the tune of When Johnny Comes Marching Home. The team also uses the song Rock You Like a Hurricane to lead the team onto the field, and Hurricane by Australian band Faker, the anthem for team mascot Captain Hurricane.

== See also ==
- Cricket Tasmania
- Tasmania cricket team
