= Riley Meredith =

Australian cricketer (born 1996)

Personal information
- Full name: Riley Patrick Meredith
- Born: 21 June 1996 (age 30); Hobart, Tasmania, Australia
- Batting: Right-handed
- Bowling: Right-arm fast
- Role: Bowler

International information
- National side: Australia (2021–2026)
- ODI debut (cap 234): 22 July 2021 v West Indies
- Last ODI: 15 November 2026 v England
- ODI shirt no.: 34
- T20I debut (cap 97): 3 March 2021 v New Zealand
- Last T20I: 21 November 2026 v England
- T20I shirt no.: 34

Domestic team information
- Years: Team
- 2017/18–present: Tasmania (squad no. 12)
- 2017/18–present: Hobart Hurricanes (squad no. 21)
- 2021: Punjab Kings (squad no. 12)
- 2022–2023: Mumbai Indians (squad no. 21)
- 2024–2026: Somerset (squad no. 12)
- 2025: Islamabad United (squad no. 12)
- 2025: Welsh Fire (squad no. 12)
- 2026: Hyderabad Kingsmen (squad no. 34)

Career statistics
Competition	ODI	T20I	FC	LA
Matches	4	7	43	48
Runs scored	19	–	336	100
Batting average	–	–	12.00	9.09
100s/50s	0/0	–	0/0	0/0
Top score	17*	–	44	17*
Balls bowled	168	161	7,252	2,406
Wickets	2	10	145	68
Bowling average	101.00	27.10	28.92	31.27
5 wickets in innings	0	0	2	1
10 wickets in match	0	0	0	0
Best bowling	1/50	3/48	5/96	5/26
Catches/stumpings	1/–	0/–	14/–	19/–
- Source: ESPNcricinfo, 21 November 2026

Riley Patrick Meredith (born 21 June 1996) is an Australian cricketer. He made his international debut for the Australia cricket team in March 2021. He currently plays for Tasmania and Hobart Hurricanes.

== Domestic and T20 career ==
Meredith made his List A debut for Cricket Australia XI against Pakistanis during their tour of Australia on 10 January 2017. He made his first-class debut for Tasmania in the 2017–18 Sheffield Shield season on 13 November 2017. He made his Twenty20 debut for the Hobart Hurricanes in the 2017–18 Big Bash League season on 1 February 2018.

In February 2021, Meredith was bought by Punjab Kings ahead of the 2021 Indian Premier League. In February 2022, he was bought by the Mumbai Indians in the auction for the 2022 Indian Premier League tournament.

In April 2022, he was bought by the London Spirit for the 2022 season of The Hundred. Due to injury he was replaced by Nathan Ellis without playing a game for the team.

In April 2023, he came as replacement of Jhye Richardson in 2023 Indian Premier League for Mumbai Indians.

In May 2024, he was signed by Somerset County Cricket Club to play across all formats. In October of that year, Meredith re-signed for Somerset for the 2025 T20 Blast. He took 28 wickets in 14 games, and was the top wicket-taker in the tournament. In November 2025, he signed for Somerset again to play in the 2026 edition of the Blast.

In July 2024, he was selected by the Trent Rockets as a stand-in player for The Hundred while Joe Root was on international duty with the England Test team.

In January 2025, Meredith was part of the Hurricanes squad that won the 2024–25 Big Bash League final, taking three wickets in the first innings of the match.

== International career ==
On 16 July 2020, Meredith was named in a 26-man preliminary squad of players to begin training ahead of a possible tour to England following the COVID-19 pandemic. On 14 August 2020, Cricket Australia confirmed that the fixtures would be taking place, with Meredith included in the touring party.

In January 2021, Meredith was named in Australia's Twenty20 International (T20I) squad for their series against New Zealand, going on to make his international debut on 3 March. In June 2021, Meredith was named in Australia's limited overs squad for their tours of the West Indies and Bangladesh. Meredith made his One Day International (ODI) debut on 22 July 2021, for Australia against the West Indies. However, the match was suspended after the toss took place, following a positive test for COVID-19 from a non-playing member of the West Indies team. As the match was suspended, and not abandoned, play resumed two days later after the fixtures were rescheduled following no further COVID-19 cases.
