= Nathan Ellis =

Australian cricketer (born 1994)

Personal information
- Full name: Nathan Trevor Ellis
- Born: 22 September 1994 (age 32); Greenacre, New South Wales, Australia
- Batting: Right-handed
- Bowling: Right-arm fast-medium
- Role: Bowler

International information
- National side: Australia (2021–present)
- ODI debut (cap 235): 29 March 2022 v Pakistan
- Last ODI: 27 September 2026 v South Africa
- ODI shirt no.: 12
- T20I debut (cap 98): 6 August 2021 v Bangladesh
- Last T20I: 21 June 2026 v Bangladesh
- T20I shirt no.: 12

Domestic team information
- Years: Team
- 2018/19–present: Hobart Hurricanes (squad no. 72)
- 2019/20–present: Tasmania
- 2021–2024: Punjab Kings
- 2022–2023: Hampshire
- 2022–2024: London Spirit
- 2025: Chennai Super Kings
- 2026: Sunrisers Leeds

Career statistics
Competition	ODI	T20I	FC	LA
Matches	27	39	10	49
Runs scored	192	39	205	365
Batting average	14.76	7.80	14.64	15.86
100s/50s	0/0	0/0	0/0	0/0
Top score	36*	12	41	36*
Balls bowled	1,330	819	2,156	2,349
Wickets	40	58	42	75
Bowling average	28.95	18.06	29.33	26.93
5 wickets in innings	1	0	2	2
10 wickets in match	0	0	0	0
Best bowling	5/31	4/12	6/43	5/31
Catches/stumpings	8/—	12/–	3/–	13/–
- Source: ESPNcricinfo, 27 September 2026

Nathan Trevor Ellis (born 22 September 1994) is an Australian cricketer. He made his international debut for the Australia cricket team in August 2021. He made history when he became the first cricketer to take a hat-trick on his debut in a Twenty20 International (T20I) match.

== Career ==
In September 2018, Ellis was named in the Hobart Hurricanes' squad for the 2018 Abu Dhabi T20 Trophy. He made his Twenty20 debut for the Hobart Hurricanes in the 2018 Abu Dhabi T20 Trophy on 5 October 2018. He made his List A debut for Tasmania, on 23 September 2019, in the 2019–20 Marsh One-Day Cup. He made his first-class debut on 24 February 2020, for Tasmania in the 2019–20 Sheffield Shield season.

In June 2021, Ellis was named as a travelling reserve player for Australia's Twenty20 International (T20I) series against Bangladesh. Prior to the tour, Ellis was moved up to Australia's full squad, covering for Riley Meredith.

Ellis made his T20I debut on 6 August 2021, for Australia against Bangladesh. In the match, Ellis took a hat-trick, to become the first cricketer to take a hat-trick on debut in a T20I match. He became the third Australian cricketer to achieve a hat-trick in a T20 International, after Brett Lee and Ashton Agar. Later the same month, Ellis was named as one of three players as injury cover in Australia's squad for the 2021 ICC Men's T20 World Cup.

In February 2022, he was bought by the Punjab Kings in the auction for the 2022 Indian Premier League tournament. Later the same month, Ellis was named in Australia's One Day International (ODI) squad for their tour of Pakistan. He made his ODI debut on 29 March 2022, for Australia against Pakistan.

In March 2022, Ellis was signed by the Hampshire Hawks for the 2022 Vitality Blast season in England.

Ellis was retained by the Punjab Kings for both the 2023 and 2024 IPL seasons. He became a key player for the Kings in the 2023 season, playing in 10 matches and taking 13 wickets including his best figures in an IPL match of 4 for 30 against Rajasthan Royals in the inaugural IPL match played at the Assam Cricket Association Stadium in Guwahati.

In May 2024, he was named in Australia's squad for the 2024 ICC Men's T20 World Cup tournament.

In November 2024, he was signed by Chennai Super Kings in the auction for the 2025 Indian Premier League season in India.
