= Allister de Winter =

Australian cricketer and coach

Personal information
- Full name: Allister John de Winter
- Born: 12 March 1968 (age 58); Launceston, Tasmania, Australia
- Batting: Right-handed
- Bowling: Right-arm fast-medium
- Role: Bowler

Domestic team information
- Years: Team
- 1986/87–1992/93: Tasmania

Career statistics
Competition	First-class	List A
Matches	21	10
Runs scored	411	134
Batting average	13.70	22.33
100s/50s	0/1	0/0
Top score	51	36
Balls bowled	3,509	384
Wickets	35	13
Bowling average	50.51	29.53
5 wickets in innings	1	0
10 wickets in match	0	0
Best bowling	5/88	3/39
Catches/stumpings	12/–	1/–
- Source: CricInfo, 14 August 2010

Allister de Winter (born 12 March 1968) is an Australian retired first class cricketer who played for the Tasmanian Tigers from 1986 until 1993. Following his retirement, de Winter pursued a career as a junior development coach. In 2002 he coached the Tasmanian Tigers under-19 side, alongside fellow former Tigers player Michael Farrell. In 2003 the Western Australian Cricket Association employed de Winter as a state development coach. In 2005 de Winter moved to Bangladesh, to take up the position as head coach of the Bangladesh National Cricket Academy and coach of the under-19 Bangladesh cricket team, taking them to a 5th place at the 2006 ICC under-19 World Cup. He is currently the assistant coach of the Tasmanian Tigers, a position he has held since the 2007–08 season.
