= Ashley Barrow =

Australian cricket umpire (born 1962)

Personal information
- Born: 11 October 1962 (age 64); Melbourne, Australia

Umpiring information
- WTests umpired: 1 (2011)
- WODIs umpired: 4 (2010–2014)
- WT20Is umpired: 1 (2013)
- Source: Cricinfo, 4 March 2017

Ashley Barrow (born 11 October 1962) is an Australian cricket umpire. He has stood in domestic matches in the 2016–17 Sheffield Shield season and the 2016–17 Big Bash League season. He has also stood as an umpire in international matches between the Australian and England women's cricket teams.
