= Beau Webster =

Australian cricketer (born 1993)

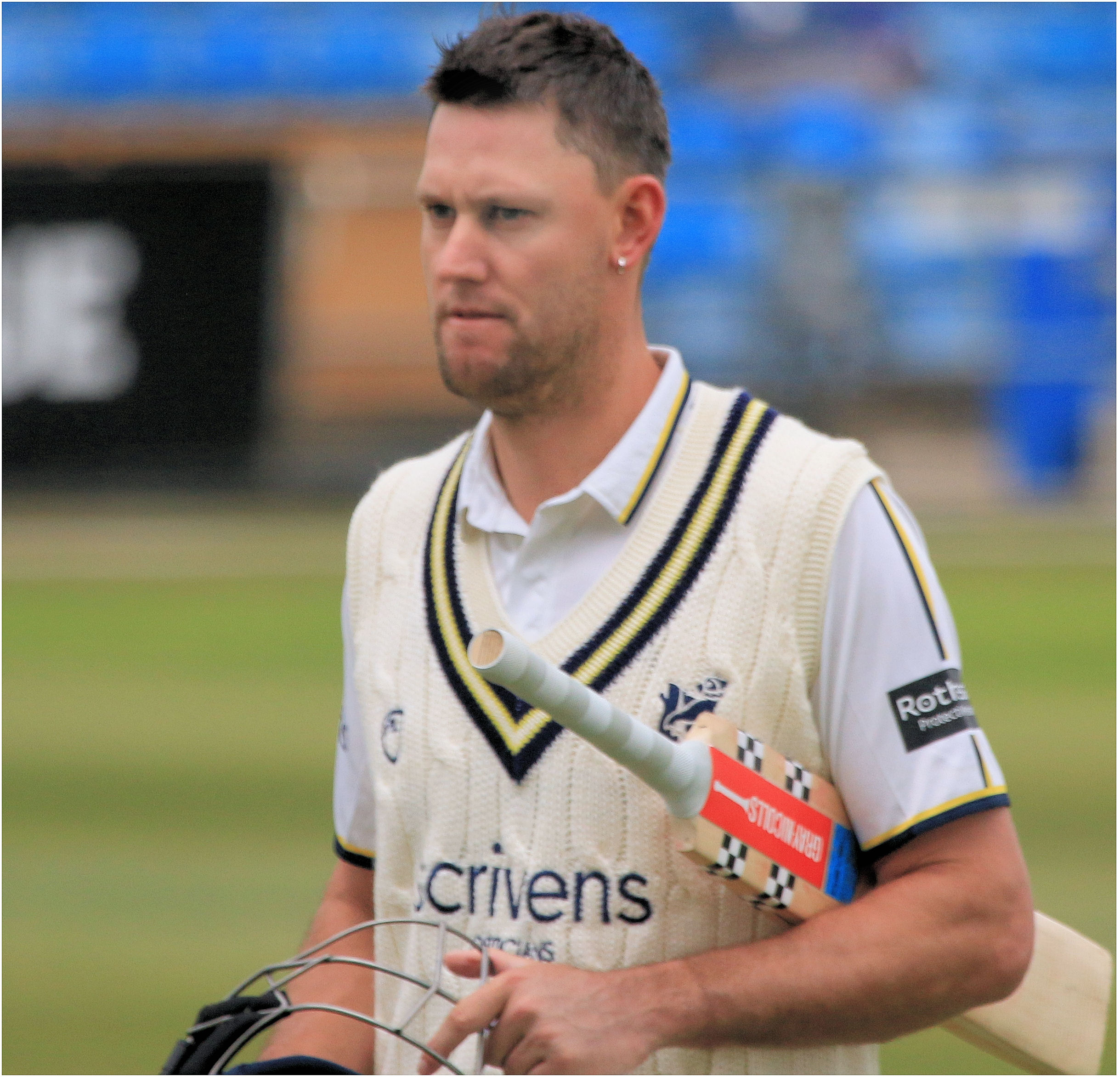
- Webster playing for Warwickshire in 2025

Personal information
- Full name: Beau Jacob Webster
- Born: 1 December 1993 (age 32); Snug, Tasmania, Australia
- Nickname: Slug
- Height: 200 cm (6 ft 7 in)
- Batting: Right-handed
- Bowling: Right-arm off-break; Right-arm medium
- Role: All-rounder

International information
- National side: Australia
- Test debut (cap 469): 3 January 2025 v India
- Last Test: 18 October 2026 v South Africa

Domestic team information
- Years: Team
- 2013/14–present: Tasmania
- 2016/17: Hobart Hurricanes
- 2017/18–2020/21: Melbourne Renegades
- 2021/22–2024/25: Melbourne Stars
- 2023: Essex
- 2024: Gloucestershire
- 2025–2026: Warwickshire
- 2025/26: Hobart Hurricanes

Career statistics
Competition	Test	FC	LA	T20
Matches	12	129	64	113
Runs scored	533	7,132	1,681	2,541
Batting average	31.35	36.95	32.96	30.98
100s/50s	0/5	14/37	2/9	1/17
Top score	72	187	138	112
Balls bowled	729	13,575	1,857	978
Wickets	12	223	57	34
Bowling average	32.33	34.04	30.08	36.91
5 wickets in innings	0	4	1	0
10 wickets in match	0	0	0	0
Best bowling	3/64	6/100	6/17	4/29
Catches/stumpings	16/–	169/–	42/–	56/–
Medal record
Men's cricket
Representing Australia
ICC World Test Championship
Runner-up	2023–2025
- Source: Cricinfo, 18 October 2026

Beau Jacob Webster (born 1 December 1993) is an Australian International cricketer who plays for Tasmania at state level, and the Hobart Hurricanes in the Big Bash League. He also represents Australia in Test cricket. An all-rounder, Webster is a right-handed batter capable of bowling both right-arm medium and off spin.

Webster's ability to bowl both spin and pace was revealed during the 2020–21 Sheffield Shield season, with Webster having introduced pace bowling to his game as a new skill learned during the first lockdown period due to the COVID-19 pandemic. This skill set has resulted in Webster earning comparisons to former Test cricketers Colin Miller and Andrew Symonds.

== Early life ==
Webster grew up in Snug, Tasmania and played cricket for the Kingborough Cricket Club.

== Domestic career ==
Webster made his first-class debut for Tasmania against Queensland in the Sheffield Shield at Hobart in February 2014 after representing the Tasmania U-23 team. He made his List A debut for Tasmania in the 2016–17 Matador BBQs One-Day Cup on 3 October 2016. He made his Twenty20 debut for Hobart Hurricanes on 2 January 2017 in the 2016–17 Big Bash League season.

Webster became the captain of Cricket Australia XI for the 2017–18 JLT One-Day Cup. In the first match of the cup against South Australia he scored 121, his first List A century to help lead Cricket Australia XI to just the second win in the team's history. His 229-run partnership with Jake Carder was the fourth-highest second-wicket partnership in the history of Australia's domestic List A competition. He was named the player of the match for his efforts. He again top scored for Cricket Australia XI against Western Australia with 52, but after he was dismissed, the team suffered a major batting collapse and lost by 9 wickets. He was Cricket Australia XI's top run scorer for the cup with 247 runs at an average of 41.16.

In 2020, he decided to take advantage of his height by bowling medium pace, utilizing extra bounce on his deliveries.

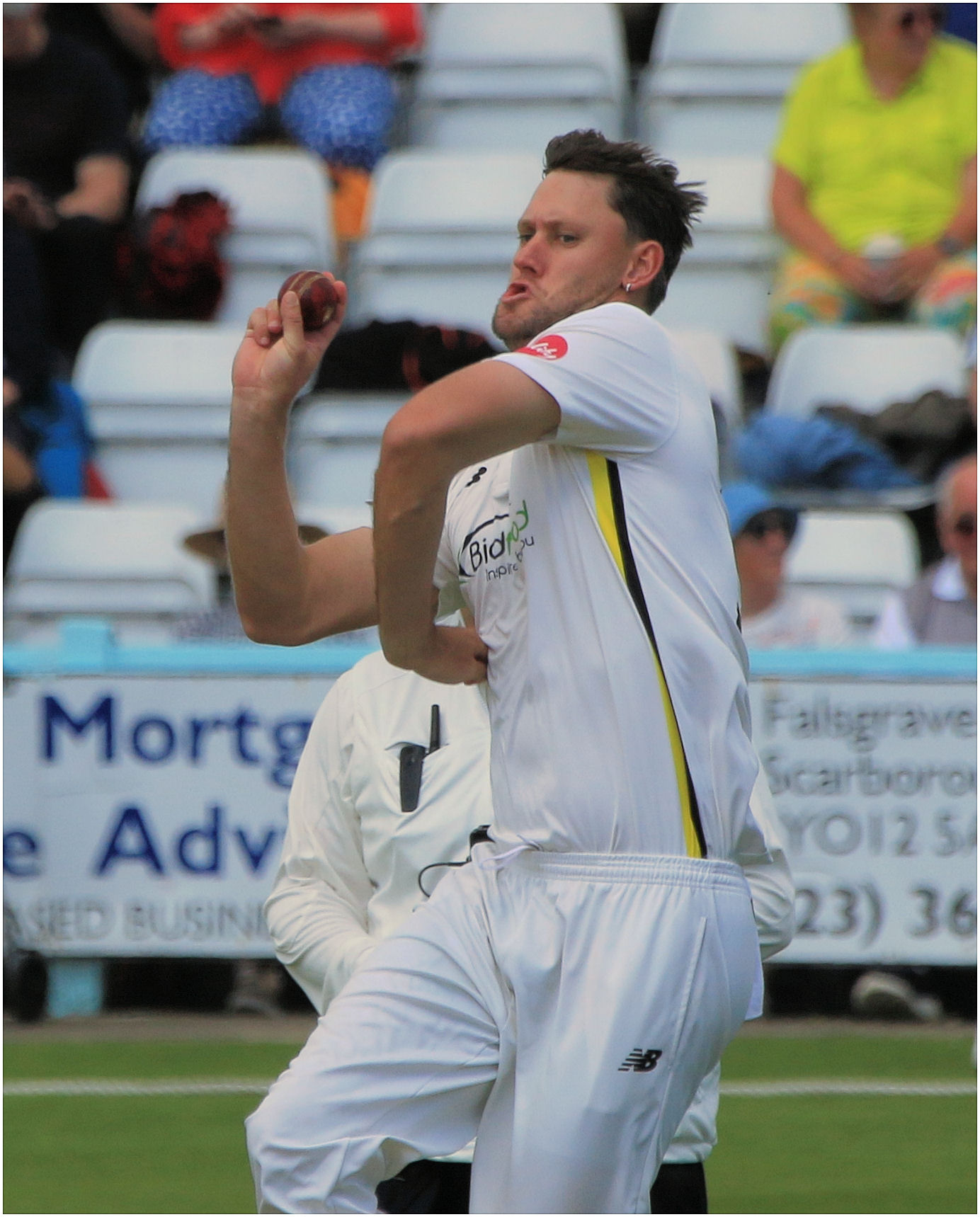
Webster bowling for Gloucestershire in 2024

In 2023 he joined Essex for the One-Day Cup and was the team's leading run scorer and wicket-taker in the competition. In February 2024, he was named as part of the squad for Gloucestershire ahead of the 2024 domestic season. At the conclusion of the 2023–24 Sheffield Shield season, he was named as the player of the series, scoring 938 runs at an average of 58.62 and taking 30 wickets with an average of 29.30. He became the second player in the Sheffield Shield after Garfield Sobers to score 900 runs and take 30 wickets in the same season.

On 25 October 2024, he took his maiden List A five-wicket haul, taking figures of 6/17 in a spell that saw Western Australia lose 8 wickets for just 1 run.

In January 2025, Webster signed a contract to play three months of the forthcoming English County Championship season for Warwickshire.

== International career ==
In November 2024, Webster was called up to the Australian squad ahead of the second Test against India as an injury cover for Mitchell Marsh. He made his Test debut against India in the fifth Test at Sydney on 3 January 2025 where he scored the only half century in either of the two teams' first innings.

In January 2025, Webster was named in Australia's squad for a two-Test series against Sri Lanka.

In June 2025, Webster was part of Australia's XI for the 2025 World Test Championship final. In the first innings, he scored 72 off 92 balls on a difficult batting surface.

In June 2025, Webster was named in Australia's squad for the tour of West Indies.

Webster was named in the 2025/26 Ashes squad but was not included in the playing teams for the first four Tests. He was called into the XI for the fifth Test in Sydney where he scored an unbeaten 71 in the first innings.
