= Ben McDermott =

Australian cricketer (born 1994)

Personal information
- Full name: Benjamin Reginald McDermott
- Born: 12 December 1994 (age 31); Caboolture, Queensland, Australia
- Height: 1.83 m (6 ft 0 in)
- Batting: Right-handed
- Bowling: Right-arm medium
- Role: Opening batter
- Relatives: Craig McDermott (father); Alister McDermott (brother)

International information
- National side: Australia (2018–2023)
- ODI debut (cap 232): 20 June 2021 v West Indies
- Last ODI: 2 April 2022 v Pakistan
- ODI shirt no.: 47
- T20I debut (cap 93): 22 October 2018 v UAE
- Last T20I: 3 December 2023 v India
- T20I shirt no.: 47

Domestic team information
- Years: Team
- 2013/14: Brisbane Heat
- 2014/15, 2023/24–2024/25: Queensland
- 2015/16–2022/23, 2025/26–present: Tasmania
- 2015/16: Melbourne Renegades
- 2016/17–present: Hobart Hurricanes
- 2021: Derbyshire
- 2022–2024: Hampshire
- 2023: Dambulla Aura
- 2025: Karachi Kings
- 2026: Colombo Kaps
- 2026: Lancashire
- 2026: Rotterdam Dockers

Career statistics
Competition	ODI	T20I	FC	LA
Matches	5	25	73	60
Runs scored	223	342	3,867	2,206
Batting average	44.60	18.00	33.33	38.70
100s/50s	1/1	0/2	4/25	6/13
Top score	104	54	146*	143
Catches/stumpings	0/–	14/–	64/–	45/1
- Source: ESPNCricinfo, 23 October 2026

Benjamin Reginald McDermott (born 12 December 1994) is an Australian international cricketer. He represents the Hobart Hurricanes in the Big Bash League and Tasmania in Australian domestic cricket. He made his international debut for the Australian national cricket team in October 2018.

== Early life ==
Born in Caboolture, Queensland, McDermott is the son of Australian Test cricketer Craig McDermott and is the younger brother of Alister McDermott. The McDermott family moved to the Gold Coast when McDermott was seven years of age and the two siblings began playing junior cricket for Runaway Bay and Broadbeach. McDermott made his first XI debut for The Southport School in year 9 and made a remarkable double-hundred for the Gold Coast Dolphins at under-17 level. He also represented Australia in Youth One Day Internationals at Under-19 level and played alongside his brother in the 2014 Prime Minister's XI match against England.

== Cricket career ==
McDermott made his Twenty20 debut on 18 January 2014 for the Brisbane Heat against Adelaide Strikers, scoring 30 runs. On 12 January 2017, while playing for the Hobart Hurricanes against the Melbourne Renegades in the 2016–17 Big Bash League season, he claimed his maiden T20 century by scoring 114 runs off 52 balls, including 9 sixes and 8 fours. This was also third-fastest century in the Big Bash League. He was awarded the player of the match as he helped the Hurricanes chase down 223 to defeat the Renegades in what was the highest scoring Big Bash match at the time.

In March 2017, McDermott scored his maiden first-class century, when he made 104 runs for Tasmania in round 10 of the 2016–17 Sheffield Shield season.

On 3 June 2018, McDermott was selected to play for the Winnipeg Hawks in the players' draft for the inaugural edition of the Global T20 Canada tournament.

In October 2018, McDermott was named in Australia's Twenty20 International (T20I) squad for the series against Pakistan. He made his T20I debut for Australia in the one-off match against the United Arab Emirates on 22 October 2018. In November 2018, he was added to Australia's One Day International (ODI) squad for their series against South Africa, but he did not play.

Ahead of the 2019–20 Marsh One-Day Cup, McDermott was named as one of the six cricketers to watch during the tournament.

On 16 July 2020, McDermott was named in a 26-man preliminary squad of players to begin training ahead of a possible tour to England following the COVID-19 pandemic. In June 2021, he was named in Australia's ODI squad for their tours of the West Indies and Bangladesh. McDermott made his ODI debut on 20 July 2021, for Australia against the West Indies.

In December 2021, McDermott became the first player to hit back to back centuries in the Big Bash League and also the first player to hit three centuries in the Big Bash League.

In March 2022, in the second match against Pakistan, McDermott scored his first century in ODI cricket, with 104 runs, but Pakistan won the match.

In February 2022 McDermott signed for the Hampshire Hawks for the 2022 Vitality Blast season.

In May 2023 McDermott returned to Queensland for the 2023/24 Sheffield Shield season. McDermott spent two seasons at Queensland, and initially signed a contract with them for a third season, before he was granted a release from his contract with Queensland Cricket for personal reasons. McDermott planned to move back to Tasmania with his family, and hoped to play domestic cricket for Tasmania, despite not being contracted for the season.
