= D'Arcy Short =

Australian cricketer

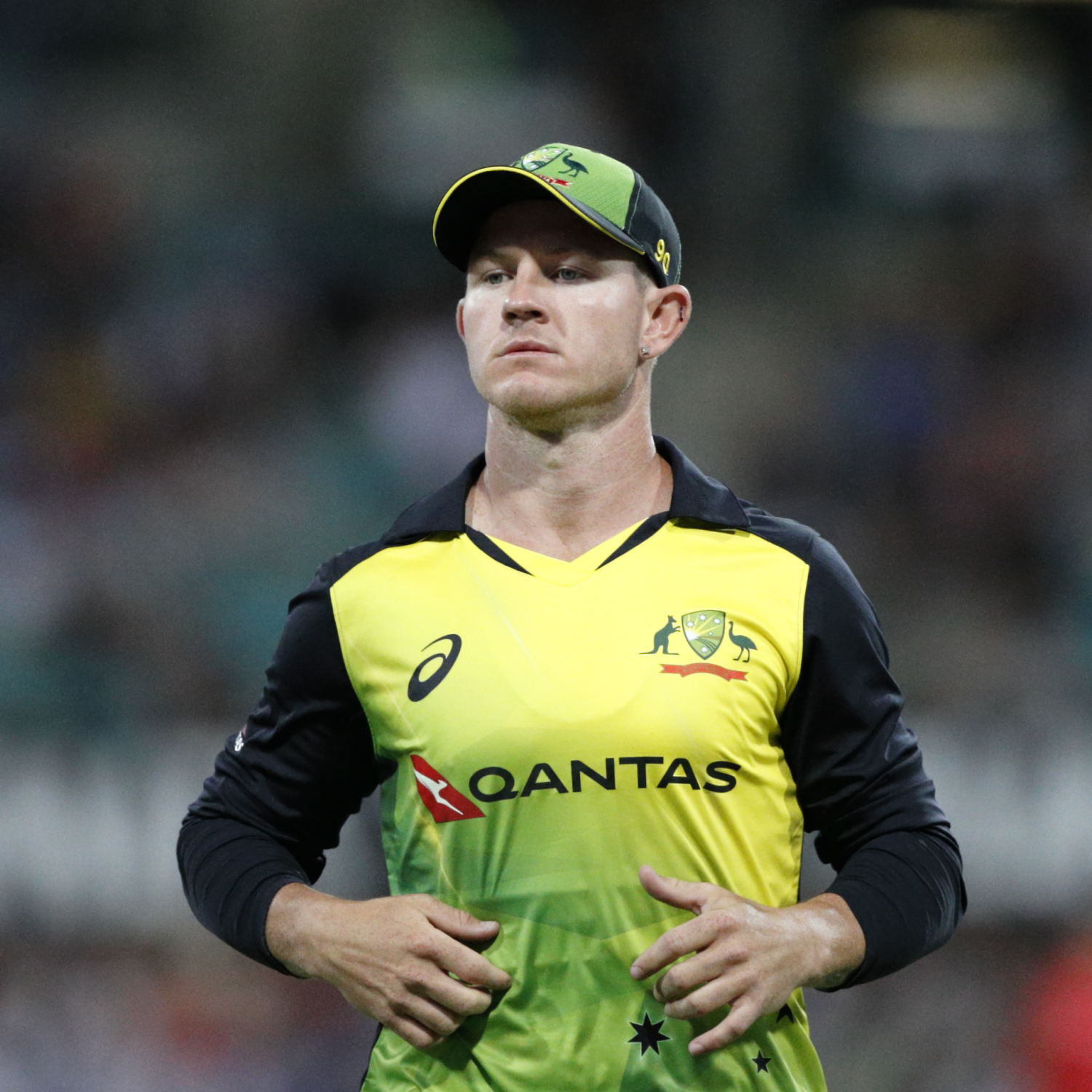
- Short in 2018 in a T20I

Personal information
- Full name: D'Arcy John Matthew Short
- Born: 9 August 1990 (age 36); Katherine, Northern Territory, Australia
- Height: 1.80 m (5 ft 11 in)
- Batting: Left-handed
- Bowling: Left-arm unorthodox spin
- Role: Opening batter

International information
- National side: Australia (2018–2020)
- ODI debut (cap 177): 16 June 2018 v England
- Last ODI: 13 March 2020 v New Zealand
- T20I debut (cap 90): 3 February 2018 v New Zealand
- Last T20I: 8 December 2020 v India
- T20I shirt no.: 23

Domestic team information
- Years: Team
- 2011/12–2024/25: Western Australia
- 2016/17–2022/23: Hobart Hurricanes
- 2018: Rajasthan Royals
- 2019: Durham
- 2021: Hampshire
- 2021: Trent Rockets
- 2023/24–2024/25: Adelaide Strikers
- 2025–present: Gloucestershire
- 2025–present: Lumbini Lions

Career statistics
Competition	ODI	T20I	FC	LA
Matches	8	23	25	73
Runs scored	211	642	1,261	2,105
Batting average	30.14	30.57	31.52	33.41
100s/50s	0/1	0/4	0/8	4/8
Top score	69	76	87	257
Balls bowled	90	114	1,819	1,526
Wickets	0	3	28	38
Bowling average	–	50.33	44.03	41.73
5 wickets in innings	–	0	0	0
10 wickets in match	–	0	0	0
Best bowling	–	1/13	3/78	3/53
Catches/stumpings	2/–	8/–	21/–	24/–
- Source: ESPNcricinfo, 12 April 2026

D'Arcy John Matthew Short (born 9 August 1990) is an Australian international cricketer, who plays One Day Internationals (ODIs) and Twenty20 Internationals (T20Is) for the Australian national team. At the domestic level, he plays for Western Australia and the Adelaide Strikers. He made his international debut for Australia in February 2018.

== Personal life ==
Short was born in Katherine, Northern Territory, but moved to Darwin at about the age of four. He is of Indigenous Australian descent through his maternal grandmother a direct descendant of an Apical Ancestor, whose ancestors are the Migunberri people. There is a special memorial setup within the Yugambeh Museum dedicated to his Apical Ancestor Elizabeth Wheeler.

Short's parents ran an indoor sports centre in Darwin and he grew up playing indoor cricket before progressing through the Darwin grade cricket leagues. At the age of 16, he commuted between Darwin and Adelaide to play in the South Australian Grade Cricket League. He later moved to Perth to have more opportunity to play at higher levels.

== Domestic and franchise career ==
Short made his List A cricket debut in November 2011 against New South Wales in the 2011–12 Ryobi One-Day Cup. He only scored 3 runs, but took two wickets with his left-arm unorthodox spin bowling, including one from the second delivery he bowled.

In February 2010, Short made his debut for Western Australia in the Futures League after performing well for the Northern Territory in the Imparja Cup in 2009. He was also selected in an Indigenous Australian cricket team that toured England in June and July 2009. In March 2011, Short was named the Lord's Taverners Indigenous Cricketer of the Year award winner.

Short made his first-class debut for Western Australia in the 2016–17 Sheffield Shield season on 17 November 2016. He made his Twenty20 (T20) debut for Hobart Hurricanes in the 2016–17 Big Bash League season on 23 December 2016, scoring a quick-fire 61 off 29 balls.

On 10 January 2018, Short made the highest individual score in a Big Bash League match at the time, scoring 122 not out off 69 balls against Brisbane Heat. During the tournament, Short scored a total of 578 runs, including five half-centuries and a century, the most runs by any player in the competition history. He also took 3 wickets during the season and was named Player of the Tournament.

In January 2018, Short was bought by the Rajasthan Royals for ₹4 crores in the 2018 IPL auction.

In March 2019, Short signed for Durham for the upcoming T20 Blast season. He made a fine start to his first game in Durham colours, contributing to a seven run victory over Northamptonshire with an aggressive innings of 46 from 40 balls, whilst also taking 2 wickets from 4 overs.

On 17 May 2021, Short signed for Hampshire Hawks for their upcoming T20 Blast season. Short was drafted by Trent Rockets as one of their overseas players for the inaugural season of The Hundred. In July 2022, he was signed by the Dambulla Giants for the third edition of the Lanka Premier League.

== International career ==
In January 2018, Short was named in Australia's Twenty20 International (T20I) squad for the 2017–18 Trans-Tasman Tri-Series, which started in February 2018. He made his T20I debut for Australia against New Zealand on 3 February 2018.

Short scored a match winning 76 from 46 balls against New Zealand at Eden Park later in the same series. New Zealand posted a mammoth total of 243 with the help of a century from the bat of Martin Guptill. Australia started their innings with David Warner and Short with the pair scoring 121 for the first wicket, including the highest powerplay score of 91 runs. Australia eventually won the match by recording the highest successful chase ever in T20I history, with Short named as the man of the match for his batting performance.

In May 2018, Short was named in Australia's One Day International (ODI) squad for the series against England. He made his ODI debut for Australia against England on 16 June 2018.

In June 2018, Short along with Aaron Finch registered the highest ever opening partnership of 223 runs in a T20I match against Zimbabwe which was ended in the final over with Short managing to score only 46 runs off 42 balls while Finch went on to score a world record individual score of 172 off 76 balls. The partnership of 223 between Finch and Short is also the highest partnership for any wicket in a T20I and also marked the first ever instance of a 200+ run stand in a T20I match for any wicket. The partnership was also the second highest ever partnership for any wicket in any form of T20, just behind 229 runs set by Virat Kohli and AB de Villiers. Australia finally won the match by 100 runs, which is their biggest winning margin in T20Is.

On 16 July 2020, Short was named in a 26-man preliminary squad of players to begin training ahead of a possible tour to England following the COVID-19 pandemic. After the tour to England, which Short did not embark on, he resumed his national duties in the T20I series against India.
