= Jake Reed (cricketer) =

Australian cricketer (born 1990)

Jake Kenneth Reed
Personal information
- Born: 28 September 1990 (age 36)

Domestic team information
- Years: Team
- 2013–2014: Melbourne Renegades
- 2014–: Victoria
- 2014–2017 2019–: Hobart Hurricanes

Career statistics
Competition	FC	T20
Matches	7	10
Runs scored	38	8
Batting average	7.60	-
100s/50s	0/0	0/0
Top score	11	8*
Balls bowled	870	186
Wickets	11	16
Bowling average	48.27	17.31
5 wickets in innings	0	0
10 wickets in match	0	0
Best bowling	3/114	4/14
Catches/stumpings	2/–	2/–
- Source: Cricinfo, 5 October 2021

Jake Kenneth Reed (born 28 September 1990) is an Australian cricketer. He plays for Victoria. He made his debut for the Hobart Hurricanes in the BBL04 on 2 January 2015.
