= Paul Wilson (cricketer) =

Australian cricketer and umpire (born 1972)

Personal information
- Full name: Paul Wilson
- Born: 12 January 1972 (age 54); Newcastle, New South Wales, Australia
- Nickname: Blocker
- Batting: Right-handed
- Bowling: Right-arm fast-medium
- Role: Bowler

International information
- National side: Australia
- Only Test (cap 376): 18 March 1998 v India
- ODI debut (cap 136): 17 December 1997 v New Zealand
- Last ODI: 14 February 1998 v New Zealand

Domestic team information
- Years: Team
- 1993/94–2001/02: South Australia
- 2002/03–2003/04: Western Australia

Umpiring information
- Tests umpired: 8 (2019–2023)
- ODIs umpired: 36 (2014–2022)
- T20Is umpired: 26 (2014–2022)
- WTests umpired: 1 (2011)
- WODIs umpired: 8 (2017–2022)
- WT20Is umpired: 1 (2011)

Career statistics
Competition	Test	ODI	FC	LA
Matches	1	11	51	84
Runs scored	0	4	405	161
Batting average	–	1.33	9.41	7.66
100s/50s	0/0	0/0	0/0	0/0
Top score	0*	2	32*	16
Balls bowled	72	562	11,095	4,542
Wickets	0	13	151	114
Bowling average	–	34.61	30.77	26.63
5 wickets in innings	–	0	4	0
10 wickets in match	–	0	0	0
Best bowling	–	3/39	6/76	4/23
Catches/stumpings	0/–	1/–	8/–	8/–
- Source: Cricinfo, 1 June 2023

Paul Wilson (born 12 January 1972) is an Australian cricket umpire and former cricketer who played one Test match and 11 One Day Internationals (ODIs) for the Australian national cricket team, as well as domestically represented South Australia and Western Australia.

Born in Newcastle, New South Wales, Wilson moved to Adelaide to attend the Australian Cricket Academy, and went on to debut for South Australia during the 1995–96 season. A solidly-built right-arm fast bowler, all of his matches at international level came during the 1997–98 season, with his single Test coming during Australia's tour of India. Wilson remained active at the domestic level until the early 2000s, switching to Western Australia for the 2002–03 season. Retiring at the end of the 2003–04 season, for a time he served as the coach of the Western Fury in the Women's National Cricket League. Wilson later became an umpire, and currently sits on Cricket Australia's national umpires panel.

== Playing career ==
Wilson left a trainee accountant job in Newcastle to travel to Adelaide, where he requested a place at the Australian Cricket Academy.

He emerged late in 1993–94 to make his debut for South Australia. He played 51 first-class games in all, taking 151 wickets at a healthy average of 30.77.

In 2002 he moved to Western Australia where he was contracted by the Western Warriors. He played two seasons for the Warriors, retiring at the end of the 2003–04 season.

After a stint in the 'A' side, Wilson was promoted to the Australian side. He played one Test Match, against India, in Kolkata, in March 1998, but had the unfortunate record of having scored neither a run, nor taken a wicket, after he limped off injured in the early stages of the game. He did not represent Australia again. Before that, he had a short spell as a bowler in the ODI team, playing in 11 games, all in the 1997–98 Australian season.

== Coaching ==
Wilson served as Western Fury coach after retiring.

== Umpiring ==
Wilson is currently an umpire on the Cricket Australia Project Umpire's Panel. He stood in two Twenty20 International games in 2014. He stood in his first One Day International match on 8 November 2014 between Hong Kong and Papua New Guinea in Australia.

He was one of the seventeen on-field umpires for the 2018 Under-19 Cricket World Cup. He was one of the sixteen umpires to stand in matches during the 2019 Cricket World Cup.

In September 2019, in the one-off match between Bangladesh and Afghanistan, Wilson stood in his first Test match. In February 2022, he was named as one of the on-field umpires for the 2022 Women's Cricket World Cup in New Zealand.

In September 2023, he was named as one of the sixteen match officials for 2023 Cricket World Cup.

In February 2024, Wilson announced his retirement from his umpiring career.

== See also ==
- One Test Wonder
- List of Test cricket umpires
- List of One Day International cricket umpires
- List of Twenty20 International cricket umpires
