= 2021–22 Melbourne Renegades season =

Australian domestic cricket team

Melbourne Renegades
2021–22 season
- Coach: David Saker
- Captain(s): Nic Maddinson
- Home ground: Marvel Stadium (Capacity: 47,000); GMHBA Stadium (Capacity: 26,000)
- BBL Season: 8th
- BBL Finals: DNQ
- Leading Run Scorer: Aaron Finch (386)
- Leading Wicket Taker: Kane Richardson (19)
- Highest home attendance: 10,014 (13 January 2022 vs Melbourne Stars, Week 6)
- Lowest home attendance: 4,351 (8 January 2022 vs Sydney Thunder, Week 5)
- Average home attendance: 7,361

The 2021–22 Melbourne Renegades season was the eleventh in the club's history. Coached by David Saker and captained by Nic Maddinson, they competed in the BBL's 2021–22 season.

== Standings ==
Pos	Team	Pld	W	L	NR	BP	Pts	NRR	Qualification
1	Perth Scorchers (C)	14	11	3	0	7	40	0.926	Advanced to play-off phase
2	Sydney Sixers	14	9	4	1	6	35	1.027	Advanced to play-off phase
3	Sydney Thunder	14	9	5	0	8	35	0.725	Advanced to play-off phase
4	Adelaide Strikers	14	6	8	0	10	28	0.237	Advanced to play-off phase
5	Hobart Hurricanes	14	7	7	0	6	27	−0.332	Advanced to play-off phase
6	Melbourne Stars	14	7	7	0	5	26	−0.222	
7	Brisbane Heat	14	3	11	0	7	16	−0.910	
8	Melbourne Renegades	14	3	10	1	5	16	−1.477	

Source: ESPNcricinfo
(C) Champions

== Fixtures and results ==
=== Pre-season ===
30 November 2021
Summary

Melbourne Renegades Academy; 7/149 (20 overs)	v	Melbourne Stars Academy; 6/152 (19.4 overs)

Melbourne Stars Academy won by 4 wickets
CitiPower Centre, Melbourne

30 November 2021
Summary

Melbourne Stars Academy; 4/175 (20 overs)	v	Melbourne Renegades Academy; 7/165 (20 overs)

Melbourne Stars Academy won by 10 runs
CitiPower Centre, Melbourne

1 December 2021
Summary

Melbourne Renegades; 6/143 (18 overs)	v	Hobart Hurricanes

No result
CitiPower Centre, Melbourne

3 December 2021
Summary

Melbourne Renegades; 5/208 (20 overs)	v	Melbourne Stars; 9/156 (20 overs)

Melbourne Renegades won by 52 runs
CitiPower Centre, Melbourne

=== Home and away season ===
Match 3
7 December 2021
19:15 (N)
Scorecard

(H) Melbourne Renegades; 9/153 (20 overs)	v	Adelaide Strikers; 8/151 (20 overs)
Mackenzie Harvey 56 (46); Peter Siddle 3/42 (4 overs)		Harry Nielsen 30 (30); Zahir Khan 3/24 (4 overs)

Melbourne Renegades won by 2 runs
Marvel Stadium, Melbourne
Attendance: 8,932
Umpires: Phillip Gillespie and Michael Graham-Smith
Player of the match: Zahir Khan (Melbourne Renegades)

- Melbourne Renegades won the toss and elected to bat.
- James Seymour (Melbourne Renegades) and Daniel Drew (Adelaide Strikers) both made their T20 debuts.

Match 6
9 December 2021
18:45 (N)
Scorecard

(H) Adelaide Strikers; 149 (19 overs)	v	Melbourne Renegades; 100 (18.4 overs)
Jonathan Wells 37 (30); Kane Richardson 4/32 (4 overs)		Sam Harper 33 (31); Wes Agar 3/17 (3 overs)

Adelaide Strikers won by 49 runs
Adelaide Oval, Adelaide
Attendance: 8,408
Umpires: Michael Graham-Smith and Ben Treloar
Player of the match: Wes Agar (Adelaide Strikers)

- Adelaide Strikers won the toss and elected to bat.

Match 11
13 December 2021
18:15 (N)
Scorecard

Melbourne Renegades; 6/140 (20 overs)	v	Brisbane Heat (H); 5/141 (16.5 overs)
Mackenzie Harvey 71* (56); James Bazley 3/28 (4 overs)		Sam Heazlett 44* (29); Zahir Khan 2/27 (4 overs)

Brisbane Heat won by 5 wickets
Metricon Stadium, Gold Coast
Attendance: 6,489
Umpires: Bruce Oxenford and David Taylor
Player of the match: James Bazley (Brisbane Heat)

- Brisbane Heat won the toss and elected to field.

Match 17
22 December 2021
19:15 (N)
Scorecard

Perth Scorchers; 5/206 (20 overs)	v	Melbourne Renegades (H); 5/185 (20 overs)
Mitchell Marsh 86 (53); Kane Richardson 3/33 (4 overs)		Aaron Finch 68 (43); Ashton Agar 2/23 (3 overs)

Perth Scorchers won by 21 runs
Marvel Stadium, Melbourne
Attendance: 9,487
Umpires: Donovan Koch and Ben Treloar
Player of the match: Mitchell Marsh (Perth Scorchers)

- Perth Scorchers won the toss and elected to bat.

Match 21
26 December 2021
21:15 (N)
Scorecard

Melbourne Renegades; 8/151 (20 overs)	v	Perth Scorchers (H); 2/152 (16.5 overs)
Mackenzie Harvey 45 (40); Jason Behrendorff 2/19 (4 overs)		Colin Munro 58* (32); Nic Maddinson 1/5 (1 over)

Perth Scorchers won by 8 wickets
Marvel Stadium, Melbourne
Attendance: 1,785
Umpires: Phillip Gillespie and Nathan Johnstone
Player of the match: Mitchell Marsh (Perth Scorchers)

- Melbourne Renegades won the toss and bat.

Match 26
29 December 2021
19:15 (N)
Scorecard

Hobart Hurricanes; 5/206 (20 overs)	v	Melbourne Renegades (H); 121 (15.5 overs)
Ben McDermott 127 (65); Reece Topley 2/17 (4 overs)		Sam Harper 57 (35); Tom Rogers 3/24 (3 overs)

Hobart Hurricanes won by 85 runs
Marvel Stadium, Melbourne
Attendance: 8,314
Umpires: Michael Graham-Smith and Tony Wilds
Player of the match: Ben McDermott (Hobart Hurricanes)

- Melbourne Renegades won the toss and elected to field.
- Ben McDermott (Hobart Hurricanes) became the first player to score two consecutive 100s in the BBL.

Match 30
1 January 2022
19:30 (N)
Scorecard

Melbourne Renegades	v	Sydney Sixers (H)

No result
Coffs Harbour International Stadium, Coffs Harbour
Attendance: 5,164
Umpires: Phillip Gillespie and David Taylor

- Sydney Sixers won the toss and elected to field.
- No play was possible due to rain.

Match 33
3 January 2022
19:15 (N)
Scorecard

(H) Melbourne Stars; 126 (20 overs)	v	Melbourne Renegades; 5/129 (18 overs)
Hilton Cartwright 41 (29); Nic Maddinson 3/20 (4 overs)		Aaron Finch 50 (40); Tom O'Connell 2/11 (2 overs)

Melbourne Renegades won by 5 wickets
Melbourne Cricket Ground, Melbourne
Attendance: 21,562
Umpires: Geoff Davidson and Bruce Oxenford
Player of the match: Kane Richardson (Melbourne Renegades)

- Melbourne Stars won the toss and elected to bat.
- Patrick Rowe (Melbourne Stars) made his T20 debut.
- X-factor subs: James Seymour (Melbourne Renegades) replaced Will Sutherland.

Match 37
6 January 2022
18:05 (N)
Scorecard

Brisbane Heat; 6/128 (20 overs)	v	Melbourne Renegades (H); 5/129 (15 overs)
Jake Lehmann 65 (52); Mohammad Nabi 2/19 (4 overs)		Shaun Marsh 57 (35); David Grant 3/20 (4 overs)

Melbourne Renegades won by 5 wickets
GMHBA Stadium, Geelong
Attendance: 4,611
Umpires: Bruce Oxenford and Ben Treloar
Player of the match: Shaun Marsh (Melbourne Renegades)

- Melbourne Renegades won the toss and elected to field.
- Jack Clayton, David Grant, Ronan McDonald, Steve McGiffin, Lachlan Pfeffer and Will Prestwidge (Brisbane Heat) all made their T20 debuts.
- X-factor subs: Mohammad Nabi (Melbourne Renegades) replaced James Pattinson.

Match 40
8 January 2022
18:05 (N)
Scorecard

Sydney Thunder; 7/209 (20 overs)	v	Melbourne Renegades (H); 80 (14.2 overs)
Daniel Sams 98* (44); Kane Richardson 2/39 (4 overs)		James Seymour 25 (23); Mohammad Hasnain 3/22 (3.2 overs)

Sydney Thunder won by 129 runs
Marvel Stadium, Melbourne
Attendance: 4,351
Umpires: Bruce Oxenford and Ben Treloar
Player of the match: Daniel Sams (Sydney Thunder)

- Melbourne Renegades won the toss and elected to field.

Match 45
11 January 2022
19:15 (N)
Scorecard

Sydney Sixers; 6/150 (20 overs)	v	Melbourne Renegades (H); 105 (17 overs)
Moises Henriques 49 (35); Cameron Boyce 2/15 (4 overs)		Shaun Marsh 39 (36); Ben Dwarshuis 5/26 (4 overs)

Sydney Sixers won by 45 runs
GMHBA Stadium, Geelong
Attendance: 5,821
Umpires: Michael Graham-Smith and David Taylor
Player of the match: Ben Dwarshuis (Sydney Sixers)

- Sydney Sixers won the toss and elected to bat.
- Ben Dwarshuis (Sydney Sixers) took his maiden five-wicket haul in T20s.

Match 48
13 January 2022
19:35 (N)
Scorecard

(H) Melbourne Renegades; 7/122 (20 overs)	v	Melbourne Stars; 4/123 (14.3 overs)
Aaron Finch 45 (44); Qais Ahmad 2/15 (4 overs)		Glenn Maxwell 68* (45); Kane Richardson 1/12 (3 overs)

Melbourne Stars won by 6 wickets
Marvel Stadium, Melbourne
Attendance: 10,014
Umpires: Gerard Abood and Ben Treloar
Player of the match: Glenn Maxwell (Melbourne Stars)

- Melbourne Renegades won the toss and elected to bat.

Match 54
18 January 2022
19:15 (N)
Scorecard

(H) Hobart Hurricanes; 5/182 (20 overs)	v	Melbourne Renegades; 6/176 (20 overs)
Matthew Wade 48 (39); Josh Lalor 2/37 (4 overs); Cameron Boyce 2/37 (4 overs)		Aaron Finch 75 (52); Tom Rogers 3/35 (4 overs)

Hobart Hurricanes won by 6 runs
Marvel Stadium, Melbourne
Attendance: 1,324
Umpires: Shawn Craig and Tony Wilds
Player of the match: Aaron Finch (Melbourne Renegades)

- Hobart Hurricanes won the toss and elected to bat.

Match 55
19 January 2022
16:10 (D/N)
Scorecard

(H) Sydney Thunder; 8/170 (20 overs)	v	Melbourne Renegades; 7/169 (20 overs)
Usman Khawaja 77 (51); Cameron Boyce 5/21 (4 overs)		Aaron Finch 82 (64); Gurinder Sandhu 3/33 (4 overs)

Sydney Thunder won by 1 run
Melbourne Cricket Ground, Melbourne
Attendance: 8,886
Umpires: Simon Lightbody and Tony Wilds
Player of the match: Cameron Boyce (Melbourne Renegades)

- Melbourne Renegades won the toss and elected to field.
- Cameron Boyce (Melbourne Renegades) became the first bowler to take four wickets in four consecutive deliveries in the BBL.

== Squad ==
The squad for the 2021–22 Big Bash League season.

- Players with international caps are listed in **bold**.
- Ages are given as of the first match of the tournament, 5 December 2021

No.	Name	Nationality	Date of birth (age)	Batting style	Bowling style	Notes
Batsmen
18	Unmukt Chand	India	26 March 1993 (aged 28)	Right-handed	Right arm off break	Visa contract
5	**Aaron Finch**	Australia	17 November 1986 (aged 35)	Right-handed	Slow left arm orthodox	
23	Jake Fraser-McGurk	Australia	11 April 2002 (aged 19)	Right-handed	Right arm leg break	
14	**Marcus Harris**	Australia	21 July 1992 (aged 29)	Left-handed	Right arm off break	
3	Mackenzie Harvey	Australia	18 September 2000 (aged 21)	Left-handed	Right arm medium-fast	
53	**Nic Maddinson**	Australia	21 December 1991 (aged 29)	Left-handed	Left-arm orthodox	Captain
9	**Shaun Marsh**	Australia	9 July 1983 (age 36)	Left-handed	Slow left arm orthodox	Vice captain
35	James Seymour	Australia	13 March 1992 (age 29)	Left-handed	Right arm off break	Replacement player for Shaun Marsh
All-rounders
29	Jonathan Merlo	Australia	15 December 1998 (aged 22)	Right-handed	Right-arm medium-fast	Replacement player for Nic Maddinson
7	**Mohammad Nabi**	Afghanistan	1 January 1985 (aged 36)	Right-handed	Right arm off break	Visa contract
12	Will Sutherland	Australia	27 October 1999 (aged 22)	Right-handed	Right arm fast medium	
61	Jack Prestwidge	Australia	28 February 1996 (age 24)	Right-handed	Right-arm medium fast	
Wicketkeepers
6	Sam Harper	Australia	10 December 1996 (aged 24)	Right-handed	–	
4	Brayden Stepien	Australia	27 July 1997 (aged 24)	Right-handed	Right-arm medium	Local replacement player
Pace bowlers
2	Zak Evans	Australia	26 March 2000 (age 19)	Right-handed	Right-arm fast	
11	Josh Lalor	Australia	2 November 1987 (age 33)	Right-handed	Left arm fast medium	
19	**James Pattinson**	Australia	3 May 1990 (aged 31)	Right-handed	Right arm fast	
16	Mitchell Perry	Australia	27 April 2000 (age 20)	Left-handed	Right-arm fast medium	
55	**Kane Richardson**	Australia	12 February 1991 (aged 30)	Right-handed	Right arm fast medium	Vice captain
24	**Reece Topley**	England	21 February 1994 (age 27)	Right-handed	Left arm medium-fast	Visa contract
Spin bowlers
13	**Cameron Boyce**	Australia	27 July 1989 (aged 32)	Right-handed	Right arm leg break	
75	**Zahir Khan**	Afghanistan	20 December 1998 (aged 22)	Left-handed	Left-arm unorthodox	Visa contract

== Administration and support staff ==
The current administration and support staff of the Melbourne Renegades for the 2021–22 Big Bash League season as of 29 November 2021.

Position	Name		
Head coach	David Saker		
List manager	Andrew Lynch		
Assistant coach	Simon Helmot		
Assistant coach	Andre Borovec		
Bowling coach	Michael Lewis		
Strength and conditioning coach	Richard Johnson	Physiotherapist	Nick Adcock

- Source:Renegades staff

== Season statistics ==
=== Home attendance ===
Match No.	Opponent	Attendance
3	Adelaide Strikers	8,932
17	Perth Scorchers	9,487
26	Hobart Hurricanes	8,314
37	Brisbane Heat	4,611
40	Sydney Thunder	4,351
45	Sydney Sixers	5,821
48	Melbourne Stars	10,014
Total Attendance		51,530
Average Attendance		7,361
