= 2021–22 Melbourne Stars season =

Overview of Melbourne Stars in 2021–22

Melbourne Stars
2021–22 season
- Coach: David Hussey
- Captain(s): Glenn Maxwell
- Home ground: Melbourne Cricket Ground, Melbourne
- BBL Season: 6th
- Leading Run Scorer: Glenn Maxwell (468)
- Leading Wicket Taker: Brody Couch (16)

The 2021–22 Melbourne Stars season was the eleventh in the club's history. The team was coached by David Hussey and captained by Glenn Maxwell, which they had competed in the BBL's 2021–22 season.

== Squad ==
The squad for the 2021–22 Big Bash League season.

- Players with international caps are listed in **bold**.
- Ages are given as of the first match of the tournament, 5 December 2021

No.	Name	Nationality	Date of birth (age)	Batting style	Bowling style	Notes
Batsmen
15	Joe Burns	Australia	6 September 1989 (aged 32)	Right-handed	Right-arm medium	International Cap
10	Will Pucovski	Australia	2 February 1998 (aged 23)	Right-handed	Right-arm off break	International Cap
36	Nick Larkin	Australia	1 May 1990 (aged 31)	Right-handed	—	
53	Nic Maddinson	Australia	21 December 1991 (aged 29)	Left-handed	Left-arm orthodox	International Cap
All-rounders
16	Marcus Stoinis	Australia	16 August 1989 (aged 32)	Right-handed	Right-arm medium	Vice Captain; International Cap
23	Clint Hinchliffe	Australia	23 October 1996 (aged 25)	Left-handed	Slow left-arm unorthodox	
32	Glenn Maxwell	Australia	14 October 1988 (aged 33)	Right-handed	Right-arm off-spin	Captain; International Cap
35	Hilton Cartwright	Australia	14 February 1992 (aged 29)	Right-handed	Right-arm medium	International Cap
Wicketkeepers
13	Seb Gotch	Australia	12 July 1993 (aged 28)	Right-handed	Right-arm off-break	
29	Nicholas Pooran	West Indies	2 October 1995 (aged 26)	Left-handed	—	Visa Contract and International Cap
72	Andre Fletcher	West Indies	28 November 1987 (aged 34)	Right-handed	—	Visa Contract and International Cap
Pace bowlers
7	Nathan Coulter-Nile	Australia	11 October 1987 (aged 34)	Right-handed	Right-arm fast	International Cap
9	Jackson Coleman	Australia	18 December 1991 (aged 29)	Right-handed	Right-arm fast-medium	U-19 International Cap
19	Liam Hatcher	Australia	17 September 1996 (aged 25)	Right-handed	Right-arm fast	
28	Lance Morris	Australia	28 March 1998 (aged 23)	Right-handed	Right-arm fast-medium	
37	Billy Stanlake	Australia	4 November 1994 (aged 27)	Left-handed	Right-arm fast	International Cap
43	Sam Rainbird	Australia	5 June 1992 (aged 29)	Right-handed	Left-arm medium-fast	International Cap
77	Haris Rauf	Pakistan	7 November 1993 (aged 28)	Right-handed	Right-arm fast	Visa Contract and International Cap
90	Dilbar Hussain	Pakistan	20 February 1993 (aged 28)	Right-handed	Right-arm fast	Visa Contract
Spin bowlers
6	Tom O'Connell	Australia	14 June 2000 (aged 21)	Left-handed	Right-arm leg spin	
88	Adam Zampa	Australia	31 March 1992 (aged 29)	Right-handed	Right-arm leg-break	International Cap

== Season results and standings ==
=== Ladder ===
Pos	Team	Pld	W	L	NR	BP	Pts	NRR	Qualification
1	Perth Scorchers (C)	14	11	3	0	7	40	0.926	Advanced to play-off phase
2	Sydney Sixers	14	9	4	1	6	35	1.027	Advanced to play-off phase
3	Sydney Thunder	14	9	5	0	8	35	0.725	Advanced to play-off phase
4	Adelaide Strikers	14	6	8	0	10	28	0.237	Advanced to play-off phase
5	Hobart Hurricanes	14	7	7	0	6	27	−0.332	Advanced to play-off phase
6	Melbourne Stars	14	7	7	0	5	26	−0.222	
7	Brisbane Heat	14	3	11	0	7	16	−0.910	
8	Melbourne Renegades	14	3	10	1	5	16	−1.477	

Source: ESPNcricinfo
(C) Champions

=== Regular season ===
Match 1
5 December 2021
19:15 (N)
Scorecard

(H) Sydney Sixers; 4/213 (20 overs)	v	Melbourne Stars; 61 (11.1 overs)
Josh Philippe 83 (47); Brody Couch 2/36 (3 overs)		Peter Nevill 18 (14); Steve O'Keefe 4/14 (4 overs)

Sydney Sixers won by 152 runs
Sydney Cricket Ground, Sydney
Umpires: Phillip Gillespie and Michael Graham-Smith
Player of the match: Josh Philippe (Sydney Sixers)

- Melbourne Stars won the toss and elected to field.
- Brody Couch, Sam Elliott and Syed Faridoun (Melbourne Stars) all made their T20 debuts.
- The Sydney Sixers' winning margin of 152 runs was the largest in a BBL match, bettering the previous record of 145 runs which also was set by the Sixers.

Match 7
10 December 2021
19:15 (N)
Scorecard

(H) Melbourne Stars; 4/165 (20 overs)	v	Sydney Thunder; 5/161 (20 overs)
Nick Larkin 52* (43); Tanveer Sangha 2/29 (4 overs)		Matthew Gilkes 56 (49); Nathan Coulter-Nile 2/27 (4 overs)

Melbourne Stars won by 4 runs
Melbourne Cricket Ground, Melbourne
Umpires: Darren Close and Greg Davidson
Player of the match: Nick Larkin (Melbourne Stars)

- Sydney Thunder won the toss and elected to field.

Match 10
12 December 2021
19:15 (N)
Scorecard

(H) Sydney Thunder; 5/151 (20 overs)	v	Melbourne Stars; 4/155 (17.1 overs)
Alex Ross 77* (49); Qais Ahmad 2/17 (4 overs)		Andre Russell 42* (21); Tanveer Sangha 2/20 (4 overs)

Melbourne Stars won by 6 wickets
Sydney Showground Stadium, Sydney
Umpires: Gerard Abood and Ben Treloar
Player of the match: Andre Russell (Melbourne Stars)

- Melbourne Stars won the toss and elected to field.

Match 13
15 December 2021
19:15 (N)
Scorecard

(H) Melbourne Stars; 5/177 (20 overs)	v	Sydney Sixers; 3/182 (19.4 overs)
Glenn Maxwell 103 (57); Dan Christian 1/17 (2 overs)		Josh Philippe 99* (61); Brody Couch 1/22 (3 overs)

Sydney Sixers won by 7 wickets
Melbourne Cricket Ground, Melbourne
Umpires: Shawn Craig and Bruce Oxenford
Player of the match: Josh Phillipe (Sydney Sixers)

- Sydney Sixers won the toss and elected to field.
- X-factor subs: Hayden Kerr (Sydney Sixers) replaced Lloyd Pope.

Match 19
24 December 2021
15:30
Scorecard

(H) Hobart Hurricanes; 6/180 (20 overs)	v	Melbourne Stars; 9/156 (20 overs)
Ben McDermott 67 (43); Andre Russell 3/48 (4 overs)		Joe Clarke 52 (40); Tom Rogers 3/29 (4 overs)

Hobart Hurricanes won by 24 runs
Blundstone Arena, Hobart
Umpires: Darren Close and Michael Graham-Smith
Player of the match: Nathan Ellis (Hobart Hurricanes)

- Hobart Hurricanes won the toss and elected to bat.

Match 23
27 December 2021
20:05 (N)
Scorecard

Melbourne Stars; 9/207 (20 overs)	v	Brisbane Heat (H); 9/187 (20 overs)
Joe Clarke 85 (44); Mark Steketee 3/40 (4 overs)		Chris Lynn 57 (34); Qais Ahmad 3/26 (4 overs)

Melbourne Stars won by 20 runs
The Gabba, Brisbane
Umpires: Gerard Abood and Tony Wilds
Player of the match: Joe Clarke (Melbourne Stars)

- Brisbane Heat won the toss and elected to field.

Match 31
2 January 2022
15:30 (D/N)
Scorecard

Perth Scorchers; 8/180 (20 overs)	v	Melbourne Stars (H); 130 (18.5 overs)
Kurtis Patterson 54 (39); Qais Ahmad 2/26 (4 overs)		Joe Clarke 52 (32); Tymal Mills 3/28 (3.5 overs)

Perth Scorchers won by 50 runs
Junction Oval, Melbourne
Umpires: Geoff Davidson and Bruce Oxenford
Player of the match: Peter Hatzoglou (Perth Scorchers)

- Perth Scorchers won the toss and elected to bat.
- Xavier Crone and Tom Rogers (Melbourne Stars) both made their T20 debuts.

Match 33
3 January 2022
19:15 (N)
Scorecard

(H) Melbourne Stars; 126 (20 overs)	v	Melbourne Renegades; 5/129 (18 overs)
Hilton Cartwright 41 (29); Nic Maddinson 3/20 (4 overs)		Aaron Finch 50 (40); Tom O'Connell 2/11 (2 overs)

Melbourne Renegades won by 5 wickets
Melbourne Cricket Ground, Melbourne
Attendance: 21,562
Umpires: Geoff Davidson and Bruce Oxenford
Player of the match: Kane Richardson (Melbourne Renegades)

- Melbourne Stars won the toss and elected to bat.
- Patrick Rowe (Melbourne Stars) made his T20 debut.
- X-factor subs: James Seymour (Melbourne Renegades) replaced Will Sutherland.

Match 44
10 January 2022
19:15 (N)
Scorecard

Adelaide Strikers; 9/139 (20 overs)	v	Melbourne Stars (H); 5/140 (19.1 overs)
Jonathan Wells 68 (56); Qais Ahmad 2/21 (4 overs)		Joe Clarke 83 (58); Peter Siddle 2/26 (4 overs)

Melbourne Stars won by 5 wickets
Melbourne Cricket Ground, Melbourne
Attendance: 5,802
Umpires: Nathan Johnstone and Troy Penman
Player of the match: Joe Clarke (Melbourne Stars)

- Melbourne Stars won the toss and elected to field.

Match 27 (Note: Originally the match was scheduled to be played on 30 December 2021 but was postponed due to COVID-19 cases in Melbourne Stars' squad.)
11 January 2022
14:10 (D/N)
Scorecard

(H) Perth Scorchers; 3/196 (20 overs)	v	Melbourne Stars; 9/149 (20 overs)
Laurie Evans 69 (46); Haris Rauf 2/38 (4 overs)		Beau Webster 63 (47); Matthew Kelly 4/25 (4 overs)

Perth Scorchers won by 47 runs
GMHBA Stadium, Geelong
Umpires: Phillip Gillespie and Simon Lightbody
Player of the match: Laurie Evans (Perth Scorchers)

- Perth Scorchers won the toss and elected to bat.
- X-factor subs: Clint Hinchliffe (Melbourne Stars) replaced Brody Couch.

Match 48
13 January 2022
19:35 (N)
Scorecard

(H) Melbourne Renegades; 7/122 (20 overs)	v	Melbourne Stars; 4/123 (14.3 overs)
Aaron Finch 45 (44); Qais Ahmad 2/15 (4 overs)		Glenn Maxwell 68* (45); Kane Richardson 1/12 (3 overs)

Melbourne Stars won by 6 wickets
Marvel Stadium, Melbourne
Attendance: 10,014
Umpires: Gerard Abood and Ben Treloar
Player of the match: Glenn Maxwell (Melbourne Stars)

- Melbourne Renegades won the toss and elected to bat.

Match 39 (Note: Originally the match was scheduled to be played on 7 January 2022 but was postponed due to COVID-19 cases in Melbourne Stars' squad.)
15 January 2022
10:10
Scorecard

(H) Adelaide Strikers; 6/155 (20 overs)	v	Melbourne Stars; 8/132 (20 overs)
Jonathan Wells 73 (49); Clint Hinchliffe 2/21 (3 overs)		Hilton Cartwright 49 (35); Henry Thornton 4/26 (4 overs)

Adelaide Strikers won by 23 runs
Adelaide Oval, Adelaide
Umpires: Bruce Oxenford and Michael Graham-Smith
Player of the match: Henry Thornton (Adelaide Strikers)

- Melbourne Stars won the toss and elected to field.

Match 51
16 January 2022
19:15 (N)
Scorecard

Brisbane Heat; 6/149 (20 overs)	v	Melbourne Stars (H); 2/150 (13.5 overs)
Ben Duckett 51 (42); Glenn Maxwell 2/19 (4 overs)		Joe Clarke 62 (36); James Bazley 1/34 (3.5 overs)

Melbourne Stars won by 8 wickets
Melbourne Cricket Ground, Melbourne
Umpires: Shawn Craig and Tony Wilds

- Brisbane Heat won the toss and elected to bat.
- X-factor subs: Nick Larkin (Melbourne Stars) replaced Brody Couch.

Match 56
19 January 2022
19:50 (N)
Scorecard

(H) Melbourne Stars; 2/273 (20 overs)	v	Hobart Hurricanes; 6/167 (20 overs)
Glenn Maxwell 154* (64); Jordan Thompson 1/32 (3 overs)		Ben McDermott 55 (33); Brody Couch 3/30 (4 overs)

Melbourne Stars won by 106 runs
Melbourne Cricket Ground, Melbourne
Umpires: Gerard Abood and Donovan Koch
Player of the match: Glenn Maxwell (Melbourne Stars)

- Hobart Hurricanes won the toss and elected to field.
- X-factor subs: Jordan Thompson (Hobart Hurricanes) replaced Will Sanders.
- Glenn Maxwell (Melbourne Stars) scored the highest individual score in a BBL match.
- Melbourne Stars scored the highest team total in a BBL match.
