= 2021–22 Big Bash League season =

Season of men's professional cricket

2021–22 Big Bash League
- Dates: 5 December 2021 – 28 January 2022
- Administrator: Cricket Australia
- Cricket format: Twenty20
- Tournament format(s): Double round robin and playoffs
- Champions: Perth Scorchers (4th title)
- Participants: 8
- Matches: 61
- Attendance: 437,472 (7,172 per match)
- Player of the series: Ben McDermott (Hobart Hurricanes)
- Most runs: Ben McDermott (Hobart Hurricanes) (577)
- Most wickets: Peter Siddle (Adelaide Strikers) (30)
- Official website: bigbash.com.au

The 2021–22 Big Bash League season or BBL|11 was the eleventh season of the Big Bash League, the professional men's Twenty20 domestic cricket competition in Australia. The tournament was played from 5 December 2021 until 28 January 2022. Perth Scorchers defeated the defending champions Sydney Sixers by 79 runs in the final to claim their fourth title.

== Background ==
On 8 November 2021, Cricket Australia (CA) confirmed that the inaugural BBL First Nations round would be played between 8 January and 14 January. The matches were played at the venues in Adelaide, with the players of all teams wearing Indigenous kits designed by Aboriginal and Torres Strait Islander artists. The round was intended to illustrate the tournament's commitment to deepening education and connections with Indigenous People of Australia.

On 30 December 2021, the 27th match of the regular season between Perth Scorchers and Melbourne Stars was postponed, following a COVID-19 positive case in the Stars' camp. On 5 January 2022, the 36th match of the regular season between Brisbane Heat and Sydney Sixers was postponed, following COVID-19 cases in the Heat's camp. The 39th match of the regular season between Adelaide Strikers and Melbourne Stars was also postponed.

== Teams ==
=== Summary ===
Team	Home ground	Capacity	Captain	Head coach
Adelaide Strikers	Adelaide Oval	53,583	Travis Head	Jason Gillespie
Brisbane Heat	The Gabba; Metricon Stadium	42,000; 25,000	Jimmy Peirson	Wade Seccombe
Hobart Hurricanes	Blundstone Arena; UTAS Stadium	20,000; 21,000	Matthew Wade	Adam Griffith
Melbourne Renegades	Docklands Stadium; GMHBA Stadium	48,003; 26,000 (Note: During the season, the stadium was undergoing construction, which had reduced the stadium's capacity to around 26,000. The stadium will have a capacity of 40,000 once construction is complete.)	Nic Maddinson	David Saker
Melbourne Stars	Melbourne Cricket Ground; Junction Oval	100,024; 7,000	Glenn Maxwell	David Hussey
Perth Scorchers	Perth Stadium	60,000	Ashton Turner	Adam Voges
Sydney Sixers	Sydney Cricket Ground; Coffs Harbour International Stadium	48,000; 20,000	Moises Henriques	Greg Shipperd
Sydney Thunder	Sydney Showground Stadium; Manuka Oval	22,000; 16,000	Usman Khawaja	Trevor Bayliss

=== Visa contracted players ===
Maximum of 3 visa players permitted in the matchday squad.

Club	Player 1	Player 2	Player 3	Additional player(s)	Former player(s)
Adelaide Strikers	Ian Cockbain				George Garton ^{INT} Rashid Khan^{INT}
Brisbane Heat	Ben Duckett	Mujeeb Ur Rahman			Fakhar Zaman^{PER} Tom Abell^{INJ}
Hobart Hurricanes	Harry Brook	Sandeep Lamichhane	Jordan Thompson	Jordan Cox (Note: Only for matches Jordan Thompson is unavailable for.); Tom Lammonby (Note: Only for matches Harry Brook is unavailable for.)	
Melbourne Renegades	Mohammad Nabi	Zahir Khan	Unmukt Chand		Reece Topley^{INT}
Melbourne Stars	Joe Clarke	Syed Faridoun	Ahmed Daniyal	Andre Russell (Note: Only for matches up to 27 December 2021)	Haris Rauf^{PER} Qais Ahmad^{INT}
Perth Scorchers	Colin Munro	Laurie Evans			Tymal Mills^{INT} Brydon Carse^{INJ}
Sydney Sixers					James Vince^{INT} Chris Jordan^{INT} Carlos Brathwaite^{INJ} Tom Curran ^{INJ} Shadab Khan^{PER}
Sydney Thunder	Alex Hales	Muhammad Hasnain			Sam Billings^{INT} Saqib Mahmood^{INT}

^{INJ} Player withdrawn due to injury
^{INT} Player withdrawn due to international duties
^{PER} Player withdrawn for personal reasons and other commitments

== Venues ==
Fourteen venues have been selected to be used for the tournament, including the return of Geelong and Coffs Harbour, while a BBL match was played at the Junction Oval in Melbourne for the first time. Out of Perth Scorchers' seven scheduled home matches, only one match against Brisbane Heat was played at Perth Stadium, and all the other matches were shifted to different venues.

Adelaide	Brisbane	Canberra	Coffs Harbour	Geelong
Adelaide Oval	The Gabba	Manuka Oval	Coffs Harbour International Stadium	GHMBA Stadium
Capacity: 53,583	Capacity: 42,000	Capacity: 14,000	Capacity: 20,000	Capacity: 26,000
Matches: 7	Matches: 5	Matches: 2	Matches: 2	Matches: 2
Perth	2021–22 Big Bash League season is located in Australia			Gold Coast
Perth Stadium	2021–22 Big Bash League season is located in Australia			Metricon Stadium
Capacity: 60,000	2021–22 Big Bash League season is located in Australia			Capacity: 25,000
Matches: 1	2021–22 Big Bash League season is located in Australia			Matches: 4
Hobart	2021–22 Big Bash League season is located in Australia			Launceston
Blundstone Arena	2021–22 Big Bash League season is located in Australia			UTAS Stadium
Capacity: 19,500	2021–22 Big Bash League season is located in Australia			Capacity: 15,500
Matches: 6	2021–22 Big Bash League season is located in Australia			Matches: 2
	2021–22 Big Bash League season is located in Australia			A small stand to the left and a two tier stand and scoreboard filled with people in the backdrop of an oval grass playing surface scattered with players. Spectators stand in the foreground.
Melbourne			Sydney	
Docklands Stadium	Melbourne Cricket Ground	Junction Oval	Sydney Showground Stadium	Sydney Cricket Ground
Capacity: 54,003	Capacity: 100,024	Capacity: 7,000	Capacity: 22,000	Capacity: 48,000
Matches: 7	Matches: 6	Matches: 1	Matches: 6	Matches: 5

Note: Venues of the matches will be changed at any time by border closures restrictions due to COVID-19 pandemic.

== Pre-season ==
Pre-season matches

30 November 2021

Melbourne Renegades Academy; 7/149 (20 overs)	v	Melbourne Stars Academy; 6/152 (19 overs)

Melbourne Stars Academy won by 4 wickets
CitiPower Centre, Melbourne

30 November 2021

Melbourne Stars Academy; 4/175 (20 overs)	v	Melbourne Renegades Academy; 7/165 (20 overs)

Melbourne Stars Academy won by 10 runs
CitiPower Centre, Melbourne

1 December 2021

Melbourne Renegades; 6/143 (18 overs)	v	Hobart Hurricanes

No result
CitiPower Centre, Melbourne

3 December 2021

Melbourne Renegades; 5/208 (20 overs)	v	Melbourne Stars; 9/156 (20 overs)

Melbourne Renegades won by 52 runs
CitiPower Centre, Melbourne

== Teams and standings ==
=== Points table ===
Pos	Team	Pld	W	L	NR	BP	Pts	NRR	Qualification
1	Perth Scorchers (C)	14	11	3	0	7	40	0.926	Advanced to play-off phase
2	Sydney Sixers	14	9	4	1	6	35	1.027	Advanced to play-off phase
3	Sydney Thunder	14	9	5	0	8	35	0.725	Advanced to play-off phase
4	Adelaide Strikers	14	6	8	0	10	28	0.237	Advanced to play-off phase
5	Hobart Hurricanes	14	7	7	0	6	27	−0.332	Advanced to play-off phase
6	Melbourne Stars	14	7	7	0	5	26	−0.222	
7	Brisbane Heat	14	3	11	0	7	16	−0.910	
8	Melbourne Renegades	14	3	10	1	5	16	−1.477	

Source: ESPNcricinfo
(C) Champions

=== Win–loss table ===
A summary of results for each team's fourteen regular season matches, plus finals where applicable, in chronological order. A team's opponent for any given match is listed above the margin of victory or defeat.

Team	1	2	3	4	5	6	7	8	9	10	11	12	13	14	E	Q	K	C	F	Pos.
Adelaide Strikers (ADS)	MLR; 2 runs	MLR; 49 runs	PRS; 49 runs	SYS; 4 wickets	BRH; 39 runs	HBH; 7 wickets	SYT; 22 runs	SYT; 28 runs	HBH; 7 wickets	MLS; 23 runs	MLS; 5 wickets	BRH; 71 runs	PRS; 6 wickets	SYS; 8 wickets	HBH; 22 runs	→	SYT; 6 runs	SYS; 4 wickets	X	3rd (CM)
Brisbane Heat (BRH)	SYT; 7 wickets	PRS; 6 runs	MLR; 5 wickets	SYT; 53 runs	ADS; 39 runs	MLS; 20 runs	SYS; 2 wickets	HBH; 14 runs	SYS; 27 runs	MLR; 5 wickets	HBH; 8 wickets	ADS; 71 runs	MLS; 8 wickets	PRS; 6 wickets	X	X	X	X	X	7th (DNQ)
Hobart Hurricanes (HBH)	SYS; 14 runs	SYS; 44 runs*	PRS; 53 runs	PRS; 42 runs	MLS; 24 runs	ADS; 7 wickets	MLR; 85 runs	BRH; 14 runs	ADS; 7 wickets	BRH; 8 wickets	SYT; 9 wickets	SYT; 9 runs	MLR; 6 runs	MLS; 106 runs	ADS; 22 runs	X	X	X	X	5th (EM)
Melbourne Renegades (MLR)	ADS; 2 runs	ADS; 49 runs	BRH; 5 wickets	PRS; 21 runs	PRS; 8 wickets	HBH; 85 runs	SYS; No Result	MLS; 5 wickets	BRH; 5 wickets	SYT; 129 runs	SYS; 45 runs	MLS; 6 wickets	HBH; 6 runs	SYT; 1 run	X	X	X	X	X	8th (DNQ)
Melbourne Stars (MLS)	SYS; 152 runs	SYT; 4 runs	SYT; 6 wickets	SYS; 7 wickets	HBH; 24 runs	BRH; 20 runs	PRS; 47 runs	PRS; 50 runs	MLR; 5 wickets	ADS; 23 runs	ADS; 5 wickets	MLR; 6 wickets	BRH; 8 wickets	HBH; 106 runs	X	X	X	X	X	6th (DNQ)
Perth Scorchers (PRS)	BRH; 6 runs	ADS; 49 runs	HBH; 53 runs	HBH; 42 runs	MLR; 21 runs	MLR; 8 wickets	SYT; 34 runs	MLS; 47 runs	MLS; 50 runs	SYS; 10 runs	SYT; 6 wickets*	SYS; 5 wickets	ADS; 6 wickets	BRH; 6 wickets	→	SYS; 48 runs	→	→	SYS; 79 runs	1st (C)
Sydney Sixers (SYS)	MLS; 152 runs	HBH; 14 runs	HBH; 44 runs*	MLS; 7 wickets	ADS; 4 wickets	SYT; 30 runs*	BRH; 2 wickets	MLR; No Result	PRS; 10 runs	BRH; 27 runs	PRS; 5 wickets	MLR; 45 runs	SYT; 60 runs	ADS; 8 wickets	→	PRS; 48 runs	→	ADS; 4 wickets	PRS; 79 runs	2nd (RU)
Sydney Thunder (SYT)	BRH; 7 wickets	MLS; 4 runs	MLS; 6 wickets	BRH; 53 runs	SYS; 30 runs*	PRS; 34 runs	ADS; 22 runs	ADS; 28 runs	PRS; 6 wickets*	MLR; 129 runs	HBH; 9 wickets	HBH; 9 runs	SYS; 60 runs	MLR; 1 run	→	→	ADS; 6 runs	X	X	4th (KM)

Team's results→	Won	Lost	N/R

Last updated: 28 January 2022

=== Match summary ===
Visitor team →	ADS	BRH	HBH	MLR	MLS	PRS	SYS	SYT
Home team ↓	ADS	BRH	HBH	MLR	MLS	PRS	SYS	SYT
Adelaide Strikers		Heat; 39 runs	Strikers; 7 wickets	Strikers; 49 runs	Strikers; 23 runs	Strikers; 6 wickets	Strikers; 8 wickets	Thunder; 22 runs
Brisbane Heat	Strikers; 71 runs		Hurricanes; 8 wickets	Heat; 5 wickets	Stars; 20 runs	Scorchers; 6 wickets	Sixers; 27 runs	Thunder; 53 runs
Hobart Hurricanes	Hurricanes; 7 wickets	Heat; 14 runs		Hurricanes; 6 runs	Hurricanes; 24 runs	Scorchers; 53 runs	Sixers; 14 runs	Thunder; 9 wickets
Melbourne Renegades	Renegades; 2 runs	Renegades; 5 wickets	Hurricanes; 85 runs		Stars; 6 wickets	Scorchers; 21 runs	Sixers; 45 runs	Thunder; 129 runs
Melbourne Stars	Stars; 5 wickets	Stars; 8 wickets	Stars; 106 runs	Renegades; 5 wickets		Scorchers; 50 runs	Sixers; 7 wickets	Stars; 4 runs
Perth Scorchers	Scorchers; 49 runs	Scorchers; 6 runs	Scorchers; 42 runs	Scorchers; 8 wickets	Scorchers; 47 runs		Scorchers; 10 runs	Thunder; 6 wickets
Sydney Sixers	Sixers; 4 wickets	Sixers; 2 wickets	Hurricanes; 44 runs	Match abandoned	Sixers; 152 runs	Scorchers; 5 wickets		Sixers; 60 runs
Sydney Thunder	Thunder; 28 runs	Thunder; 7 wickets	Hurricanes; 9 runs	Thunder; 1 run	Stars; 6 wickets	Thunder; 34 runs	Sixers; 30 runs	

Home team won	Visitor team won

- Note: Results listed are according to the home (horizontal) and visitor (vertical) teams.
- Note: Click on a result to see a summary of the match.

== League stage ==
On 14 July 2021, Cricket Australia confirmed the full schedule for the tournament. 45 of the 61 games – including all of the finals – will be shown on Channel Seven, while Fox Cricket and Kayo Sports will broadcast all of the matches.

=== Week 1 ===
Match 1
5 December 2021
19:15 (N)
Scorecard

(H) Sydney Sixers; 4/213 (20 overs)	v	Melbourne Stars; 61 (11.1 overs)
Josh Philippe 83 (47); Brody Couch 2/36 (3 overs)		Peter Nevill 18 (14); Steve O'Keefe 4/14 (4 overs)

Sydney Sixers won by 152 runs
Sydney Cricket Ground, Sydney
Attendance: 10,013
Umpires: Phillip Gillespie and Michael Graham-Smith
Player of the match: Josh Philippe (Sydney Sixers)

- Melbourne Stars won the toss and elected to field.
- Brody Couch, Sam Elliott and Syed Faridoun (Melbourne Stars) all made their T20 debuts.
- The Sydney Sixers' winning margin of 152 runs was the largest in a BBL match, bettering the previous record of 145 runs which also was set by the Sixers.

Match 2
6 December 2021
19:15 (N)
Scorecard

Brisbane Heat; 8/140 (20 overs)	v	Sydney Thunder (H); 3/141 (17.1 overs)
Ben Duckett 46 (35); Daniel Sams 3/22 (4 overs)		Alex Ross 61* (46); Liam Guthrie 2/32 (3 overs)

Sydney Thunder won by 7 wickets
Manuka Oval, Canberra
Attendance: 6,824
Umpires: Greg Davidson and Tony Wilds
Player of the match: Alex Ross (Sydney Thunder)

- Sydney Thunder won the toss and elected to field.
- Liam Guthrie (Brisbane Heat) made his T20 debut.

Match 3
7 December 2021
19:15 (N)
Scorecard

(H) Melbourne Renegades; 9/153 (20 overs)	v	Adelaide Strikers; 8/151 (20 overs)
Mackenzie Harvey 56 (46); Peter Siddle 3/42 (4 overs)		Harry Nielsen 30 (30); Zahir Khan 3/24 (4 overs)

Melbourne Renegades won by 2 runs
Marvel Stadium, Melbourne
Attendance: 8,932
Umpires: Phillip Gillespie and Michael Graham-Smith
Player of the match: Zahir Khan (Melbourne Renegades)

- Melbourne Renegades won the toss and elected to bat.
- James Seymour (Melbourne Renegades) and Daniel Drew (Adelaide Strikers) both made their T20 debuts.

Match 4
8 December 2021
18:35 (N)
Scorecard

Sydney Sixers; 9/144 (20 overs)	v	Hobart Hurricanes (H); 8/130 (20 overs)
Moises Henriques 73 (48); Tom Rogers 3/28 (4 overs)		Peter Handscomb 47 (31); Tom Curran 3/27 (4 overs)

Sydney Sixers won by 14 runs
University of Tasmania Stadium, Launceston
Attendance: 3,316
Umpires: Darren Close and Bruce Oxenford
Player of the match: Moises Henriques (Sydney Sixers)

- Hobart Hurricanes won the toss and elected to field.

Match 5
8 December 2021
18:35 (N)
Scorecard

(H) Perth Scorchers; 6/157 (20 overs)	v	Brisbane Heat; 151 (19.5 overs)
Kurtis Patterson 55 (30); Cameron Gannon 2/32 (4 overs)		Xavier Bartlett 34* (25); Matthew Kelly 4/28 (4 overs)

Perth Scorchers won by 6 runs
Perth Stadium, Perth
Attendance: 16,108
Umpires: Gerard Abood and Greg Davidson
Player of the match: Matthew Kelly (Perth Scorchers)

- Perth Scorchers won the toss and elected to bat.

Match 6
9 December 2021
18:45 (N)
Scorecard

(H) Adelaide Strikers; 149 (19 overs)	v	Melbourne Renegades; 100 (18.4 overs)
Jonathan Wells 37 (30); Kane Richardson 4/32 (4 overs)		Sam Harper 33 (31); Wes Agar 3/17 (3 overs)

Adelaide Strikers won by 49 runs
Adelaide Oval, Adelaide
Attendance: 8,408
Umpires: Michael Graham-Smith and Ben Treloar
Player of the match: Wes Agar (Adelaide Strikers)

- Adelaide Strikers won the toss and elected to bat.

Match 7
10 December 2021
19:15 (N)
Scorecard

(H) Melbourne Stars; 4/165 (20 overs)	v	Sydney Thunder; 5/161 (20 overs)
Nick Larkin 52* (43); Tanveer Sangha 2/29 (4 overs)		Matthew Gilkes 56 (49); Nathan Coulter-Nile 2/27 (4 overs)

Melbourne Stars won by 4 runs
Melbourne Cricket Ground, Melbourne
Attendance: 10,888
Umpires: Darren Close and Greg Davidson
Player of the match: Nick Larkin (Melbourne Stars)

- Sydney Thunder won the toss and elected to field.

Match 8
11 December 2021
18:35 (N)
Scorecard

Hobart Hurricanes; 2/213 (20 overs)	v	Sydney Sixers (H); 4/151 (18 overs)
Matthew Wade 93 (46); Tom Curran 1/46 (3 overs)		Josh Philippe 72 (46); Joel Paris 3/35 (4 overs)

Hobart Hurricanes won by 44 runs (DLS method)
Sydney Cricket Ground, Sydney
Attendance: 11,070
Umpires: Michael Graham-Smith and Bruce Oxenford
Player of the match: Matthew Wade (Hobart Hurricanes)

- Hobart Hurricanes won the toss and elected to bat.
- Sydney Sixers were set a revised target of 196 runs from 18 overs due to rain.
- Josh Kann (Hobart Hurricanes) made his T20 debut.
- X-factor subs: Josh Kann (Hobart Hurricanes) replaced Tom Lammonby.

Match 9
11 December 2021
21:30 (N)
Scorecard

(H) Perth Scorchers; 1/195 (20 overs)	v	Adelaide Strikers; 146 (17.5 overs)
Colin Munro 114* (73)		Matthew Short 63 (47); Andrew Tye 3/21 (3 overs)

Perth Scorchers won by 49 runs
Sydney Showground Stadium, Sydney
Attendance: Closed Event
Umpires: Nathan Johnstone and Tony Wilds
Player of the match: Colin Munro (Perth Scorchers)

- Perth Scorchers won the toss and elected to bat.
- Thomas Kelly (Adelaide Strikers) made his T20 debut.
- X-factor subs: Liam Scott (Adelaide Strikers) replaced Wes Agar.

=== Week 2 ===
Match 10
12 December 2021
19:15 (N)
Scorecard

(H) Sydney Thunder; 5/151 (20 overs)	v	Melbourne Stars; 4/155 (17.1 overs)
Alex Ross 77* (49); Qais Ahmad 2/17 (4 overs)		Andre Russell 42* (21); Tanveer Sangha 2/20 (4 overs)

Melbourne Stars won by 6 wickets
Sydney Showground Stadium, Sydney
Attendance: 4,314
Umpires: Gerard Abood and Ben Treloar
Player of the match: Andre Russell (Melbourne Stars)

- Melbourne Stars won the toss and elected to field.

Match 11
13 December 2021
18:15 (N)
Scorecard

Melbourne Renegades; 6/140 (20 overs)	v	Brisbane Heat (H); 5/141 (16.5 overs)
Mackenzie Harvey 71* (56); James Bazley 3/28 (4 overs)		Sam Heazlett 44* (29); Zahir Khan 2/27 (4 overs)

Brisbane Heat won by 5 wickets
Metricon Stadium, Gold Coast
Attendance: 6,459
Umpires: Bruce Oxenford and David Taylor
Player of the match: James Bazley (Brisbane Heat)

- Brisbane Heat won the toss and elected to field.

Match 12
14 December 2021
19:15 (N)
Scorecard

Perth Scorchers; 5/182 (20 overs)	v	Hobart Hurricanes (H); 129 (19 overs)
Mitchell Marsh 100* (60); Nathan Ellis 2/33 (4 overs)		Ben McDermott 41 (29); Tymal Mills 3/23 (4 overs)

Perth Scorchers won by 53 runs
Blundstone Arena, Hobart
Attendance: 5,673
Umpires: Gerard Abood and Donovan Koch
Player of the match: Mitchell Marsh (Perth Scorchers)

- Perth Scorchers won the toss and elected to bat.

Match 13
15 December 2021
19:15 (N)
Scorecard

(H) Melbourne Stars; 5/177 (20 overs)	v	Sydney Sixers; 3/182 (19.4 overs)
Glenn Maxwell 103 (57); Dan Christian 1/17 (2 overs)		Josh Philippe 99* (61); Brody Couch 1/22 (3 overs)

Sydney Sixers won by 7 wickets
Melbourne Cricket Ground, Melbourne
Attendance: 11,037
Umpires: Shawn Craig and Bruce Oxenford
Player of the match: Josh Phillipe (Sydney Sixers)

- Sydney Sixers won the toss and elected to field.
- X-factor subs: Hayden Kerr (Sydney Sixers) replaced Lloyd Pope.

=== Week 3 ===
Match 14
19 December 2021
18:40 (N)
Scorecard

Sydney Thunder; 7/196 (20 overs)	v	Brisbane Heat (H); 143 (17.3 overs)
Sam Billings 64 (27); Mitchell Swepson 2/27 (4 overs)		Xavier Bartlett 42* (29); Saqib Mahmood 4/22 (3 overs)

Sydney Thunder won by 53 runs
The Gabba, Brisbane
Attendance: 16,189
Umpires: Darren Close and Donovan Koch
Player of the match: Saqib Mahmood (Sydney Thunder)

- Brisbane won the toss and elected to field.
- X-factor subs: Tom Cooper (Brisbane Heat) replaced Tom Abell.

Match 15
20 December 2021
16:15 (D/N)
Scorecard

Perth Scorchers (H); 7/167 (20 overs)	v	Hobart Hurricanes; 9/125 (20 overs)
Kurtis Patterson 78 (48); Jordan Thompson 3/33 (4 overs)		Wil Parker 25* (17); Andrew Tye 3/19 (4 overs)

Perth Scorchers won by 42 runs
Blundstone Arena, Hobart
Attendance: 1,990
Umpires: Gerard Abood and Tony Wilds
Player of the match: Kurtis Patterson (Perth Scorchers)

- Perth Scorchers won the toss and elected to bat.
- X-factor subs: Jordan Thompson (Hobart Hurricanes) replaced Riley Meredith.

Match 16
21 December 2021
19:15 (N)
Scorecard

Adelaide Strikers; 8/147 (20 overs)	v	Sydney Sixers (H); 6/150 (19.2 overs)
Thomas Kelly 41 (34); Dan Christian 3/8 (3 overs)		Jordan Silk 36 (24); Rashid Khan 3/20 (4 overs)

Sydney Sixers won by 4 wickets
Sydney Cricket Ground, Sydney
Attendance: 8,359
Umpires: Bruce Oxenford and David Taylor
Player of the match: Sean Abbott (Sydney Sixers)

- Adelaide Strikers won the toss and elected to bat.

Match 17
22 December 2021
19:15 (N)
Scorecard

Perth Scorchers; 5/206 (20 overs)	v	Melbourne Renegades (H); 5/185 (20 overs)
Mitchell Marsh 86 (53); Kane Richardson 3/33 (4 overs)		Aaron Finch 68 (43); Ashton Agar 2/23 (3 overs)

Perth Scorchers won by 21 runs
Marvel Stadium, Melbourne
Attendance: 9,487
Umpires: Donovan Koch and Ben Treloar
Player of the match: Mitchell Marsh (Perth Scorchers)

- Perth Scorchers won the toss and elected to bat.

Match 18
23 December 2021
18:45 (N)
Scorecard

Brisbane Heat; 7/208 (20 overs)	v	Adelaide Strikers (H); 8/169 (20 overs)
Ben Duckett 78 (47); Rashid Khan 3/34 (4 overs)		Jonathan Wells 55 (41); Mark Steketee 3/27 (4 overs)

Brisbane Heat won by 39 runs
Adelaide Oval, Adelaide
Attendance: 7,581
Umpires: Nathan Johnstone and Bruce Oxenford
Player of the match: Ben Duckett (Brisbane Heat)

- Brisbane Heat won the toss and elected to bat.

Match 19
24 December 2021
15:30
Scorecard

(H) Hobart Hurricanes; 6/180 (20 overs)	v	Melbourne Stars; 9/156 (20 overs)
Ben McDermott 67 (43); Andre Russell 3/48 (4 overs)		Joe Clarke 52 (40); Tom Rogers 3/29 (4 overs)

Hobart Hurricanes won by 24 runs
Blundstone Arena, Hobart
Attendance: 4,967
Umpires: Darren Close and Michael Graham-Smith
Player of the match: Nathan Ellis (Hobart Hurricanes)

- Hobart Hurricanes won the toss and elected to bat.

=== Week 4 ===
Match 20
26 December 2021
18:05 (D/N)
Scorecard

Sydney Sixers; 4/168 (16 overs)	v	Sydney Thunder (H); 142 (15.1 overs)
Daniel Hughes 50 (26); Daniel Sams 2/29 (3 overs)		Jason Sangha 47 (30); Hayden Kerr 3/29 (3 overs)

Sydney Sixers won by 30 runs (DLS method)
Sydney Showground Stadium, Sydney
Attendance: 10,061
Umpires: Greg Davidson and Bruce Oxenford
Player of the match: Dan Christian (Sydney Sixers)

- Sydney Thunder won the toss and elected to field.
- Rain stopped play during Sydney Sixers innings. Sydney Thunder were set a revised target of 173 runs from 16 overs.
- Todd Murphy (Sydney Sixers) made his T20 debut.
- X-factor subs: Mickey Edwards (Sydney Sixers) replaced Todd Murphy.

Match 21
26 December 2021
21:15 (N)
Scorecard

Melbourne Renegades; 8/151 (20 overs)	v	Perth Scorchers (H); 2/152 (16.5 overs)
Mackenzie Harvey 45 (40); Jason Behrendorff 2/19 (4 overs)		Colin Munro 58* (32); Nic Maddinson 1/5 (1 over)

Perth Scorchers won by 8 wickets
Marvel Stadium, Melbourne
Attendance: 1,785
Umpires: Phillip Gillespie and Nathan Johnstone
Player of the match: Mitchell Marsh (Perth Scorchers)

- Melbourne Renegades won the toss and bat.

Match 22
27 December 2021
18:05 (N)
Scorecard

Adelaide Strikers; 5/175 (20 overs)	v	Hobart Hurricanes (H); 3/176 (18.3 overs)
Matt Renshaw 63 (41); Riley Meredith 3/37 (4 overs)		Ben McDermott 110* (60); Peter Siddle 1/25 (3 overs)

Hobart Hurricanes won by 7 wickets
Blundstone Arena, Hobart
Attendance: 4,896
Umpires: Simon Lightbody and Sam Nogajski
Player of the match: Ben McDermott (Hobart Hurricanes)

- Adelaide Strikers won the toss and elected to bat.

Match 23
27 December 2021
20:05 (N)
Scorecard

Melbourne Stars; 9/207 (20 overs)	v	Brisbane Heat (H); 9/187 (20 overs)
Joe Clarke 85 (44); Mark Steketee 3/40 (4 overs)		Chris Lynn 57 (34); Qais Ahmad 3/26 (4 overs)

Melbourne Stars won by 20 runs
The Gabba, Brisbane
Attendance: 14,803
Umpires: Gerard Abood and Tony Wilds
Player of the match: Joe Clarke (Melbourne Stars)

- Brisbane Heat won the toss and elected to field.

Match 24
28 December 2021
19:15 (N)
Scorecard

(H) Sydney Thunder; 7/200 (20 overs)	v	Perth Scorchers; 8/166 (20 overs)
Sam Billings 67 (35); Matthew Kelly 3/30 (4 overs)		Colin Munro 64* (43); Nathan McAndrew 3/40 (4 overs)

Sydney Thunder won by 34 runs
Manuka Oval, Canberra
Attendance: 9,740
Umpires: Donovan Koch and David Taylor
Player of the match: Sam Billings (Sydney Thunder)

- Perth Scorchers won the toss and elected to field.
- X-factor subs: Lance Morris (Perth Scorchers) replaced Peter Hatzoglou.

Match 25
29 December 2021
18:05 (N)
Scorecard

Brisbane Heat; 105 (19.1 overs)	v	Sydney Sixers (H); 8/106 (20 overs)
Jack Wildermuth 27 (26); Sean Abbott 4/31 (4 overs)		Sean Abbott 37* (43); Jack Wildermuth 2/18 (4 overs)

Sydney Sixers won by 2 wickets.
Sydney Cricket Ground, Sydney
Attendance: 11,354
Umpires: Darren Close and Sam Nogajski
Player of the match: Sean Abbott (Sydney Sixers)

- Brisbane Heat won the toss and elected to bat.
- X-factor subs: Jack Wildermuth (Brisbane Heat) replaced Matthew Kuhnemann.

Match 26
29 December 2021
19:15 (N)
Scorecard

Hobart Hurricanes; 5/206 (20 overs)	v	Melbourne Renegades (H); 121 (15.5 overs)
Ben McDermott 127 (65); Reece Topley 2/17 (4 overs)		Sam Harper 57 (35); Tom Rogers 3/24 (3 overs)

Hobart Hurricanes won by 85 runs
Marvel Stadium, Melbourne
Attendance: 8,314
Umpires: Michael Graham-Smith and Tony Wilds
Player of the match: Ben McDermott (Hobart Hurricanes)

- Melbourne Renegades won the toss and elected to field.
- Ben McDermott (Hobart Hurricanes) became the first player to score two consecutive 100s in the BBL.

Match 28
31 December 2021
18:45 (N)
Scorecard

Sydney Thunder; 3/187 (20 overs)	v	Adelaide Strikers (H); 7/165 (20 overs)
Jason Sangha 91* (55); Fawad Ahmed 1/22 (4 overs)		Jonathan Wells 46 (26); Daniel Sams 4/33 (4 overs)

Sydney Thunder won by 22 runs
Adelaide Oval, Adelaide
Attendance: 9,555
Umpires: Darren Close and Greg Davidson
Player of the match: Jason Sangha (Sydney Thunder)

- Sydney Thunder won the toss and elected to bat.

Match 29
1 January 2022
16:00 (D/N)
Scorecard

Brisbane Heat; 8/150 (20 overs)	v	Hobart Hurricanes (H); 8/136 (20 overs)
James Bazley 44* (27); Nathan Ellis 3/41 (4 overs)		Tom Rogers 33* (20); Xavier Bartlett 4/30 (4 overs)

Brisbane Heat won by 14 runs
Blundstone Arena, Hobart
Attendance: 5,137
Umpires: Michael Graham-Smith and Nathan Johnstone
Player of the match: Xavier Bartlett (Brisbane Heat)

- Hobart Hurricanes won the toss and elected to field.
- X-factor subs: Jack Wildermuth (Brisbane Heat) replaced Liam Guthrie.

Match 30
1 January 2022
19:30 (N)
Scorecard

Melbourne Renegades	v	Sydney Sixers (H)

No result
Coffs Harbour International Stadium, Coffs Harbour
Attendance: 5,164
Umpires: Phillip Gillespie and David Taylor

- Sydney Sixers won the toss and elected to field.
- No play was possible due to rain.

=== Week 5 ===
Match 31
2 January 2022
15:30 (D/N)
Scorecard

Perth Scorchers; 8/180 (20 overs)	v	Melbourne Stars (H); 130 (18.5 overs)
Kurtis Patterson 54 (39); Qais Ahmad 2/26 (4 overs)		Joe Clarke 52 (32); Tymal Mills 3/28 (3.5 overs)

Perth Scorchers won by 50 runs
Junction Oval, Melbourne
Attendance: 3,272
Umpires: Geoff Davidson and Bruce Oxenford
Player of the match: Peter Hatzoglou (Perth Scorchers)

- Perth Scorchers won the toss and elected to bat.
- Xavier Crone and Tom Rogers (Melbourne Stars) both made their T20 debuts.

Match 32
2 January 2022
19:15 (N)
Scorecard

(H) Sydney Thunder; 7/172 (20 overs)	v	Adelaide Strikers; 144 (19.1 overs)
Matthew Gilkes 93 (57); Wes Agar 3/26 (4 overs)		Harry Nielsen 39 (31); Mohammad Hasnain 3/20 (4 overs)

Sydney Thunder won by 28 runs
Sydney Showground Stadium, Sydney
Attendance: 5,784
Umpires: Gerard Abood and Simon Lightbody
Player of the match: Matthew Gilkes (Sydney Thunder)

- Sydney Thunder won the toss and elected to bat.
- Henry Hunt (Adelaide Strikers) made his T20 debut.

Match 33
3 January 2022
19:15 (N)
Scorecard

(H) Melbourne Stars; 126 (20 overs)	v	Melbourne Renegades; 5/129 (18 overs)
Hilton Cartwright 41 (29); Nic Maddinson 3/20 (4 overs)		Aaron Finch 50 (40); Tom O'Connell 2/11 (2 overs)

Melbourne Renegades won by 5 wickets
Melbourne Cricket Ground, Melbourne
Attendance: 21,562
Umpires: Geoff Davidson and Bruce Oxenford
Player of the match: Kane Richardson (Melbourne Renegades)

- Melbourne Stars won the toss and elected to bat.
- Patrick Rowe (Melbourne Stars) made his T20 debut.
- X-factor subs: James Seymour (Melbourne Renegades) replaced Will Sutherland.

Match 34
4 January 2022
18:15 (N)
Scorecard

(H) Perth Scorchers; 8/143 (20 overs)	v	Sydney Sixers; 8/133 (20 overs)
Aaron Hardie 45 (24); Hayden Kerr 4/32 (4 overs)		Dan Christian 73 (61); Andrew Tye 3/17 (4 overs)

Perth Scorchers won by 10 runs
Metricon Stadium, Gold Coast
Attendance: 5,970
Umpires: Gerard Abood and Troy Penman
Player of the match: Aaron Hardie (Perth Scorchers)

- Perth Scorchers won the toss and elected to bat.

Match 35
5 January 2022
18:45 (N)
Scorecard

Hobart Hurricanes; 126 (19.5 overs)	v	Adelaide Strikers (H); 3/129 (15.1 overs)
D'Arcy Short 32 (32); Peter Siddle 5/23 (3.5 overs)		Matthew Short 72* (44); Sandeep Lamichhane 2/22 (4 overs)

Adelaide Strikers won by 7 wickets
Adelaide Oval, Adelaide
Attendance: 5,344
Umpires: Phillip Gillespie and Tony Wilds
Player of the match: Matthew Short (Adelaide Strikers)

- Adelaide Strikers won the toss and elected to field.
- X-factor subs: Mac Wright (Hobart Hurricanes) replaced Wil Parker.

Match 37
6 January 2022
18:05 (N)
Scorecard

Brisbane Heat; 6/128 (20 overs)	v	Melbourne Renegades (H); 5/129 (15 overs)
Jake Lehmann 65 (52); Mohammad Nabi 2/19 (4 overs)		Shaun Marsh 57 (35); David Grant 3/20 (4 overs)

Melbourne Renegades won by 5 wickets
GMHBA Stadium, Geelong
Attendance: 4,611
Umpires: Bruce Oxenford and Ben Treloar
Player of the match: Shaun Marsh (Melbourne Renegades)

- Melbourne Renegades won the toss and elected to field.
- Jack Clayton, David Grant, Ronan McDonald, Steve McGiffin, Lachlan Pfeffer and Will Prestwidge (Brisbane Heat) all made their T20 debuts.
- X-factor subs: Mohammad Nabi (Melbourne Renegades) replaced James Pattinson.

Match 38
6 January 2022
20:15 (N)
Scorecard

(H) Perth Scorchers; 9/133 (18 overs)	v	Sydney Thunder; 4/137 (17 overs)
Cameron Bancroft 30 (31); Gurinder Sandhu 4/22 (4 overs)		Jason Sangha 34 (26); Andrew Tye 2/38 (4 overs)

Sydney Thunder won by 6 wickets (DLS method)
Metricon Stadium, Gold Coast
Attendance: 556
Umpires: Gerard Abood and Troy Penman
Player of the match: Gurinder Sandhu (Sydney Thunder)

- Perth Scorchers won the toss and elected to bat.
- Rain stopped play during Perth Scorchers innings. Sydney Thunder were set a revised target of 135 runs from 18 overs due to rain.
- Gurinder Sandhu became the first player to take a hat-trick for the Sydney Thunder.

Match 40
8 January 2022
18:05 (N)
Scorecard

Sydney Thunder; 7/209 (20 overs)	v	Melbourne Renegades (H); 80 (14.2 overs)
Daniel Sams 98* (44); Kane Richardson 2/39 (4 overs)		James Seymour 25 (23); Mohammad Hasnain 3/22 (3.2 overs)

Sydney Thunder won by 129 runs
Marvel Stadium, Melbourne
Attendance: 4,351
Umpires: Bruce Oxenford and Ben Treloar
Player of the match: Daniel Sams (Sydney Thunder)

- Melbourne Renegades won the toss and elected to field.

Match 41
8 January 2022
19:30 (N)
Scorecard

(H) Brisbane Heat; 8/144 (20 overs)	v	Hobart Hurricanes; 2/145 (17.2 overs)
Lachlan Pfeffer 69 (51); Sandeep Lamichhane 2/23 (4 overs)		Ben McDermott 93 (61); Will Prestwidge 2/37 (3.2 overs)

Hobart Hurricanes won by 8 wickets
The Gabba, Brisbane
Attendance: 9,704
Umpires: Gerard Abood and David Taylor
Player of the match: Ben McDermott (Hobart Hurricanes)

- Hobart Hurricanes won the toss and elected to field.
- Paddy Dooley (Brisbane Heat) and Will Sanders (Hobart Hurricanes) both made their T20 debuts.
- X-factor subs: Mac Wright (Hobart Hurricanes) replaced Will Sanders.

=== Week 6 ===
Match 42
9 January 2022
19:15 (N)
Scorecard

(H) Sydney Sixers; 4/151 (20 overs)	v	Perth Scorchers; 5/152 (19 overs)
Dan Christian 35* (20); Ashton Agar 2/23 (4 overs)		Ashton Turner 69 (41); Ben Dwarshuis 2/34 (4 overs)

Perth Scorchers won by 5 wickets
Coffs Harbour International Stadium, Coffs Harbour
Attendance: 7,022
Umpires: Sam Nogajski and Tony Wilds
Player of the match: Ashton Turner (Perth Scorchers)

- Sydney Sixers won the toss and elected to bat.
- Justin Avendano (Sydney Sixers) became the first player to represent multiple clubs in one BBL season, after previously playing for the Melbourne Stars.

Match 43
10 January 2022
14:10
Scorecard

(H) Hobart Hurricanes; 6/139 (20 overs)	v	Sydney Thunder; 1/140 (17.2 overs)
Ben McDermott 38 (34); Nathan McAndrew 2/31 (4 overs)		Alex Hales 80* (56); D'Arcy Short 1/9 (3 overs)

Sydney Thunder won by 9 wickets
Melbourne Cricket Ground, Melbourne
Attendance: 5,802
Umpires: Gerard Abood and David Taylor
Player of the match: Alex Hales (Sydney Thunder)

- Hobart Hurricanes won the toss and elected to bat.

Match 44
10 January 2022
19:15 (N)
Scorecard

Adelaide Strikers; 9/139 (20 overs)	v	Melbourne Stars (H); 5/140 (19.1 overs)
Jonathan Wells 68 (56); Qais Ahmad 2/21 (4 overs)		Joe Clarke 83 (58); Peter Siddle 2/26 (4 overs)

Melbourne Stars won by 5 wickets
Melbourne Cricket Ground, Melbourne
Attendance: 5,802
Umpires: Nathan Johnstone and Troy Penman
Player of the match: Joe Clarke (Melbourne Stars)

- Melbourne Stars won the toss and elected to field.

Match 27 (Note: Originally the match was scheduled to be played on 30 December 2021 but was postponed due to COVID-19 cases in Melbourne Stars' squad.)
11 January 2022
14:10 (D/N)
Scorecard

(H) Perth Scorchers; 3/196 (20 overs)	v	Melbourne Stars; 9/149 (20 overs)
Laurie Evans 69 (46); Haris Rauf 2/38 (4 overs)		Beau Webster 63 (47); Matthew Kelly 4/25 (4 overs)

Perth Scorchers won by 47 runs
GMHBA Stadium, Geelong
Attendance: 5,821
Umpires: Phillip Gillespie and Simon Lightbody
Player of the match: Laurie Evans (Perth Scorchers)

- Perth Scorchers won the toss and elected to bat.
- X-factor subs: Clint Hinchliffe (Melbourne Stars) replaced Brody Couch.

Match 45
11 January 2022
19:15 (N)
Scorecard

Sydney Sixers; 6/150 (20 overs)	v	Melbourne Renegades (H); 105 (17 overs)
Moises Henriques 49 (35); Cameron Boyce 2/15 (4 overs)		Shaun Marsh 39 (36); Ben Dwarshuis 5/26 (4 overs)

Sydney Sixers won by 45 runs
GMHBA Stadium, Geelong
Attendance: 5,821
Umpires: Michael Graham-Smith and David Taylor
Player of the match: Ben Dwarshuis (Sydney Sixers)

- Sydney Sixers won the toss and elected to bat.
- Ben Dwarshuis (Sydney Sixers) took his maiden five-wicket haul in T20s.

Match 46
12 January 2022
18:15 (N)
Scorecard

Adelaide Strikers; 4/161 (20 overs)	v	Brisbane Heat (H); 90 (15 overs)
Jake Weatherald 35 (31); Will Prestwidge 2/34 (4 overs)		Ben Duckett 24 (18); Rashid Khan 6/17 (4 overs)

Adelaide Strikers won by 71 runs
The Gabba, Brisbane
Attendance: 8,386
Umpires: Phillip Gillespie and Simon Lightbody
Player of the match: Rashid Khan (Adelaide Strikers)

- Adelaide Strikers won the toss and elected to bat.

Match 47
13 January 2022
15:45 (D/N)
Scorecard

Hobart Hurricanes; 6/177 (20 overs)	v	Sydney Thunder (H); 9/168 (20 overs)
Matthew Wade 83* (54); Gurinder Sandhu 2/27 (3 overs)		Alex Hales 38 (17); Jordan Thompson 3/24 (3 overs)

Hobart Hurricanes won by 9 runs
Marvel Stadium, Melbourne
Attendance: 10,014
Umpires: Sam Nogajski and Troy Penman
Player of the match: Riley Meredith (Hobart Hurricanes)

- Hobart Hurricanes won the toss and elected to bat.
- X-factor subs: Mitchell Owen (Hobart Hurricanes) replaced Wil Parker.

Match 48
13 January 2022
19:35 (N)
Scorecard

(H) Melbourne Renegades; 7/122 (20 overs)	v	Melbourne Stars; 4/123 (14.3 overs)
Aaron Finch 45 (44); Qais Ahmad 2/15 (4 overs)		Glenn Maxwell 68* (45); Kane Richardson 1/12 (3 overs)

Melbourne Stars won by 6 wickets
Marvel Stadium, Melbourne
Attendance: 10,014
Umpires: Gerard Abood and Ben Treloar
Player of the match: Glenn Maxwell (Melbourne Stars)

- Melbourne Renegades won the toss and elected to bat.

Match 49
14 January 2022
10:10
Scorecard

Perth Scorchers; 9/127 (20 overs)	v	Adelaide Strikers (H); 4/130 (17 overs)
Laurie Evans 39 (31); Fawad Ahmed 3/30 (4 overs)		Ian Cockbain 35* (24); Aaron Hardie 3/31 (4 overs)

Adelaide Strikers won by 6 wickets
Adelaide Oval, Adelaide
Attendance: 2,869
Umpires: Michael Graham-Smith and Bruce Oxenford
Player of the match: Fawad Ahmed (Adelaide Strikers)

- Adelaide Strikers won the toss and elected to field.

Match 39 (Note: Originally the match was scheduled to be played on 7 January 2022 but was postponed due to COVID-19 cases in Melbourne Stars' squad.)
15 January 2022
10:10
Scorecard

(H) Adelaide Strikers; 6/155 (20 overs)	v	Melbourne Stars; 8/132 (20 overs)
Jonathan Wells 73 (49); Clint Hinchliffe 2/21 (3 overs)		Hilton Cartwright 49 (35); Henry Thornton 4/26 (4 overs)

Adelaide Strikers won by 23 runs
Adelaide Oval, Adelaide
Attendance: 3,511
Umpires: Bruce Oxenford and Michael Graham-Smith
Player of the match: Henry Thornton (Adelaide Strikers)

- Melbourne Stars won the toss and elected to field.

Match 50
15 January 2022
18:40 (N)
Scorecard

(H) Sydney Sixers; 5/197 (20 overs)	v	Sydney Thunder; 9/137 (20 overs)
Daniel Hughes 66 (48); Nathan McAndrew 2/30 (3 overs)		Chris Green 50 (31); Steve O'Keefe 4/18 (4 overs)

Sydney Sixers won by 60 runs
Sydney Cricket Ground, Sydney
Attendance: 20,306
Umpires: Gerard Abood and Phillip Gillespie
Player of the match: Steve O'Keefe (Sydney Sixers)

- Sydney Thunder won the toss and elected to field.

=== Week 7 ===
Match 51
16 January 2022
19:15 (N)
Scorecard

Brisbane Heat; 6/149 (20 overs)	v	Melbourne Stars (H); 2/150 (13.5 overs)
Ben Duckett 51 (42); Glenn Maxwell 2/19 (4 overs)		Joe Clarke 62 (36); James Bazley 1/34 (3.5 overs)

Melbourne Stars won by 8 wickets
Melbourne Cricket Ground, Melbourne
Attendance: 7,099
Umpires: Shawn Craig and Tony Wilds
Player of the match: Glenn Maxwell (Melbourne Stars)

- Brisbane Heat won the toss and elected to bat.
- X-factor subs: Nick Larkin (Melbourne Stars) replaced Brody Couch.

Match 52
17 January 2022
16:35 (D/N)
Scorecard

Sydney Sixers; 7/161 (20 overs)	v	Adelaide Strikers (H); 2/165 (17.3 overs)
Justin Avendano 52 (29); Fawad Ahmed 3/16 (4 overs)		Ian Cockbain 71* (42); Ben Dwarshuis 1/37 (3 overs)

Adelaide Strikers won by 8 wickets
Adelaide Oval, Adelaide
Attendance: 4,255
Umpires: Darren Close and Phillip Gillespie
Player of the match: Ian Cockbain (Adelaide Strikers)

- Sydney Sixers won the toss and elected to bat.
- Ben Dwarshuis (Sydney Sixers) took his 100th BBL wicket, becoming the first player to do so whilst representing one team and fifth player overall.

Match 53
17 January 2022
20:15 (N)
Scorecard

(H) Brisbane Heat; 7/155 (20 overs)	v	Perth Scorchers; 4/156 (18.4 overs)
Max Bryant 81 (56); Peter Hatzoglou 2/17 (4 overs)		Mitchell Marsh 59 (34); Mitchell Swepson 2/19 (4 overs)

Perth Scorchers won by 6 wickets
Marvel Stadium, Melbourne
Attendance: 480
Umpires: Shawn Craig and Ben Treloar
Player of the match: Mitchell Marsh (Perth Scorchers)

- Brisbane Heat won the toss and elected to bat.

Match 54
18 January 2022
19:15 (N)
Scorecard

(H) Hobart Hurricanes; 5/182 (20 overs)	v	Melbourne Renegades; 6/176 (20 overs)
Matthew Wade 48 (39); Josh Lalor 2/37 (4 overs); Cameron Boyce 2/37 (4 overs)		Aaron Finch 75 (52); Tom Rogers 3/35 (4 overs)

Hobart Hurricanes won by 6 runs
Marvel Stadium, Melbourne
Attendance: 1,324
Umpires: Shawn Craig and Tony Wilds
Player of the match: Aaron Finch (Melbourne Renegades)

- Hobart Hurricanes won the toss and elected to bat.

Match 36 (Note: Originally the match was scheduled to be played on 5 January 2022 but was postponed due to COVID-19 cases in Brisbane Heat's squad.)
19 January 2022
12:05
Scorecard

Sydney Sixers; 6/178 (20 overs)	v	Brisbane Heat (H); 8/151 (20 overs)
Daniel Hughes 59 (45); Michael Neser 3/39 (4 overs)		Max Bryant 57 (55); Hayden Kerr 3/23 (4 overs)

Sydney Sixers won by 27 runs
The Gabba, Brisbane
Attendance: 5,239
Umpires: Phillip Gillespie and David Taylor
Player of the match: Daniel Hughes (Sydney Sixers)

- Brisbane Heat won the toss and elected to field.
- Chris Lynn (Brisbane Heat) became the first player to score 3,000 runs in the BBL.

Match 55
19 January 2022
16:10 (D/N)
Scorecard

(H) Sydney Thunder; 8/170 (20 overs)	v	Melbourne Renegades; 7/169 (20 overs)
Usman Khawaja 77 (51); Cameron Boyce 5/21 (4 overs)		Aaron Finch 82 (64); Gurinder Sandhu 3/33 (4 overs)

Sydney Thunder won by 1 run
Melbourne Cricket Ground, Melbourne
Attendance: 8,886
Umpires: Simon Lightbody and Tony Wilds
Player of the match: Cameron Boyce (Melbourne Renegades)

- Melbourne Renegades won the toss and elected to field.
- Cameron Boyce (Melbourne Renegades) became the first bowler to take four wickets in four consecutive deliveries in the BBL.

Match 56
19 January 2022
19:50 (N)
Scorecard

(H) Melbourne Stars; 2/273 (20 overs)	v	Hobart Hurricanes; 6/167 (20 overs)
Glenn Maxwell 154* (64); Jordan Thompson 1/32 (3 overs)		Ben McDermott 55 (33); Brody Couch 3/30 (4 overs)

Melbourne Stars won by 106 runs
Melbourne Cricket Ground, Melbourne
Attendance: 8,886
Umpires: Gerard Abood and Donovan Koch
Player of the match: Glenn Maxwell (Melbourne Stars)

- Hobart Hurricanes won the toss and elected to field.
- X-factor subs: Jordan Thompson (Hobart Hurricanes) replaced Will Sanders.
- Glenn Maxwell (Melbourne Stars) scored the highest individual score in a BBL match.
- Melbourne Stars scored the highest team total in a BBL match.

== Play-offs ==
Eliminator
4	Adelaide Strikers	6/188
5	Hobart Hurricanes	166

Qualifier
1	Perth Scorchers	3/189
2	Sydney Sixers	141
Knockout
3	Sydney Thunder	6/178
4	Adelaide Strikers	6/184

Challenger
2	Sydney Sixers	6/170
4	Adelaide Strikers	4/167

Final
1	Perth Scorchers	6/171
2	Sydney Sixers	92

=== Eliminator ===
21 January 2022
19:15 (N)
Scorecard

(H) Adelaide Strikers; 6/188 (20 overs)	v	Hobart Hurricanes; 166 (19.4 overs)
Matthew Short 89 (48); Riley Meredith 2/37 (4 overs); Tom Rogers 2/37 (4 overs)		D’Arcy Short 56 (34); Peter Siddle 4/32 (3.4 overs)

Adelaide Strikers won by 22 runs
Melbourne Cricket Ground, Melbourne
Attendance: 2,082
Umpires: Phillip Gillespie and Donovan Koch
Player of the match: Matthew Short (Adelaide Strikers)

- Adelaide Strikers won the toss and elected to bat.

=== Qualifier ===
22 January 2022
19:15 (N)
Scorecard

(H) Perth Scorchers; 3/189 (20 overs)	v	Sydney Sixers; 141 (19.1 overs)
Josh Inglis 79 (49); Hayden Kerr 2/37 (4 overs)		Ben Dwarshuis 66 (28); Ashton Agar 2/16 (4 overs)

Perth Scorchers won by 48 runs
Marvel Stadium, Melbourne
Attendance: 2,071
Umpires: Gerard Abood and Shawn Craig
Player of the match: Josh Inglis (Perth Scorchers)

- Perth Scorchers won by the toss and elected to bat.
- Nicholas Bertus (Sydney Sixers) made his T20 debut.

=== Knockout ===
23 January 2022
19:15 (N)
Scorecard

Adelaide Strikers; 6/184 (20 overs)	v	Sydney Thunder (H); 6/178 (20 overs)
Ian Cockbain 65 (38); Tanveer Sangha 2/15 (4 overs)		Jason Sangha 61 (43); Harry Conway 2/33 (4 overs)

Adelaide Strikers won by 6 runs
Melbourne Cricket Ground, Melbourne
Attendance: 2,777
Umpires: Phillip Gillespie and Donovan Koch
Player of the match: Ian Cockbain (Adelaide Strikers)

- Adelaide Strikers won the toss and elected to bat.

=== Challenger ===
26 January 2022
19:25 (N)
Scorecard

Adelaide Strikers; 4/167 (20 overs)	v	Sydney Sixers (H); 6/170 (20 overs)
Jonathan Wells 62* (47); Sean Abbott 3/27 (4 overs)		Hayden Kerr 98* (58); Harry Conway 2/37 (4 overs)

Sydney Sixers won by 4 wickets
Sydney Cricket Ground, Sydney
Attendance: 10,896
Umpires: Donovan Koch and Sam Nogajski
Player of the match: Hayden Kerr (Sydney Sixers)

- Sydney Sixers won the toss and elected to field.
- Jake Carder (Sydney Sixers) made his T20 debut.

=== Final ===
28 January 2022
19:40 (N)
Scorecard

(H) Perth Scorchers; 6/171 (20 overs)	v	Sydney Sixers; 92 (16.2 overs)
Laurie Evans 76* (41); Nathan Lyon 2/24 (3 overs)		Daniel Hughes 42 (33); Andrew Tye 3/15 (3 overs)

Perth Scorchers won by 79 runs
Marvel Stadium, Melbourne
Attendance: 10,333
Umpires: Phillip Gillespie and Sam Nogajski
Player of the match: Laurie Evans (Perth Scorchers)

- Sydney Sixers won the toss and elected to field.
- X-factor subs: Justin Avendano (Sydney Sixers) replaced Jackson Bird.
