= Jack Clayton (cricketer) =

Australian cricketer

Personal information
- Full name: Jack Jamieson Clayton
- Born: 25 February 1999 (age 27); Brisbane, Queensland
- Batting: Left-handed
- Bowling: Slow left-arm orthodox
- Role: Batter

Domestic team information
- Years: Team
- 2021/22: Brisbane Heat (squad no. 84)
- 2021/22–present: Queensland (squad no. 21)

Career statistics
| Competition | FC | LA | T20 |
|---|---|---|---|
| Matches | 42 | 22 | 2 |
| Runs scored | 2,472 | 567 | 21 |
| Batting average | 38.03 | 28.35 | 10.50 |
| 100s/50s | 6/14 | 0/7 | 0/0 |
| Top score | 134 | 80 | 15 |
| Balls bowled | 88 | 48 | – |
| Wickets | 1 | 0 | – |
| Bowling average | 52.00 | – | – |
| 5 wickets in innings | 0 | – | – |
| 10 wickets in match | 0 | – | – |
| Best bowling | 1/3 | – | – |
| Catches/stumpings | 15/– | 5/– | 0/– |
- Source: Cricinfo, 23 October 2026

Jack Jamieson Clayton (born 25 February 1999) is an Australian cricketer who plays for Queensland as a batter. Clayton is also a talented Australian Rules footballer, having previously played for the Brisbane Lions academy in second tier NEAFL.

== Career ==
Clayton was offered a rookie contract by Queensland ahead of the 2020–21 season, which was renewed for 2021–22. In May 2022, Clayton was upgraded to a full contract by Queensland.

During December 2021 and January 2022, the 2021–22 Big Bash League cricket tournament was impacted with multiple cases of COVID-19 being reported across several of the competing teams. One of the teams to be severely affected by the outbreak was the Brisbane Heat. As a result, only three players in the Heat's original squad were available for their match against the Melbourne Renegades at the GMHBA Stadium in Geelong on 6 January 2022. With twelve players ruled out of the match due to COVID, the Brisbane Heat assembled a new squad for the match, with as many as ten players in line to make their debut, including Clayton. Therefore, Clayton, along with David Grant, Ronan McDonald, Steve McGiffin, Will Prestwidge and Lachlan Pfeffer all made their Twenty20 debuts in the match for the Heat. In the match, Clayton opened the batting, scoring fifteen runs, including three boundaries.

He made his first-class debut on 18 February 2022, for Queensland in the 2021–22 Sheffield Shield season.
