= List of Hobart Hurricanes cricketers =

List of cricketers

The Hobart Hurricanes are an Australian cricket club who play in the Big Bash League, the national domestic Twenty20 competition. The club was established in 2011 as an inaugural member of the eight-club league. The Big Bash League consists of a regular season and a finals series of the top five teams. This list includes players who have played at least one match for the Hurricanes in the Big Bash League.

== List of players ==
Correct as of 23 January 2023.

Players are listed according to the date of their debut for the Hurricanes. All statistics are for Big Bash League only.

- The number to the left of player name represents 'cap'. For players who debuted for club in the same match, player caps are ordered by alphabetical order of last name.
- In category "Debut" games are listed as Tournament/Round. e.g. BBL02/8 would equate to 2012–13 Big Bash League, Hobart Hurricanes' 8th Match of the tournament.
- Hover over column headings for key

Hobart Hurricanes players						Batting				Fielding		Bowling					Ref
	Player	Nat	Seasons	Debut	Mat	Runs	HS	Ave	SR	Ct	St	Wkts	BBI	Ave	Econ	SR	Ref
1	Travis Birt	(Australia)	2011–2015	BBL01/1	29	679	74	26.11	145.70	13	0	–	–	–	–	–	
2	Xavier Doherty	(Australia)	2011–2015	BBL01/1	26	46	15*	15.33	115.00	8	–	24	4/17	26.91	7.25	22.25	
3	Ben Hilfenhaus	(Australia)	2011–2015	BBL01/1	17	86	38*	17.20	114.66	5	–	18	4/27	28.11	7.84	21.50	
4	Phil Jaques	(Australia)	2011–2012	BBL01/1	8	234	73	33.42	119.38	1	–	–	–	–	–	–	
5	Jason Krejza	(Australia)	2011–2013	BBL01/1	11	8	5	2.66	66.66	5	–	11	3/39	29.45	8.52	20.72	
6	Ben Laughlin	(Australia)	2011–2014	BBL01/1	25	41	10	5.12	63.07	9	–	35	4/31	19.74	7.51	15.77	
7	Rhett Lockyear	(Australia)	2011–2012	BBL01/1	6	30	23	10.00	100.00	2	–	2	1/1	31.50	10.50	18.00	
8	Rana Naved-ul-Hasan	(Pakistan)	2011–2012	BBL01/1	8	35	30*	17.50	175.00	2	–	15	4/22	17.00	8.01	12.73	
9	Ricky Ponting	(Australia)	2011–2013	BBL01/1	8	253	63*	36.14	118.22	2	–	1	1/11	23.00	11.50	12.00	
10	Owais Shah	(England)	2011–2014	BBL01/1	22	472	69	36.30	126.88	7	–	–	–	–	–	–	
11	Tom Triffitt	(Australia)	2011–2012	BBL01/1	8	76	21	15.20	128.81	5	0	–	–	–	–	–	
12	Jonathan Wells	(Australia)	2011–2017	BBL01/2	40	814	72	30.14	120.95	13	–	0	–	–	7.71	–	
13	Matt Johnston	(Australia)	2011–2012	BBL01/3	5	28	13*	14.00	133.33	2	–	1	1/20	99.00	7.61	78.00	
14	Michael Hogan	(Australia)	2012–2013	BBL01/6	8	13	5*	6.50	72.22	3	–	5	2/22	45.20	8.07	33.60	
15	Mark Cosgrove	(Australia)	2012	BBL01/7	1	2	2	2.00	40.00	0	–	–	–	–	–	–	
16	George Bailey	(Australia)	2012–2020	BBL02/1	72	1559	74*	34.64	137.35	33	–	–	–	–	–	–	
17	Doug Bollinger	(Australia)	2012–2014	BBL02/1	18	6	6*	6.00	150.00	2	–	12	2/22	42.50	7.84	32.50	
18	Evan Gulbis	(Australia)	2012–2015	BBL02/1	16	115	22	10.45	130.68	4	–	10	3/29	33.10	9.11	21.80	
19	Tim Paine	(Australia)	2012–2022	BBL02/1	44	1129	91	27.53	121.65	28	9	–	–	–	–	–	
20	Scott Styris	(New Zealand)	2012–2013	BBL02/1	5	26	24	8.66	113.04	2	–	2	1/25	57.50	8.62	40.00	
21	Aiden Blizzard	(Australia)	2012–2014	BBL02/4	9	120	48	20.00	125.00	0	–	–	–	–	–	–	
22	Mark Higgs	(Australia)	2013	BBL02/8	1	–	–	–	–	0	–	0	–	–	10.00	–	
23	Ben Dunk	(Australia)	2013–2016	BBL03/1	26	683	96	27.32	131.09	19	0	0	–	–	10.50	–	
24	Shoaib Malik	(Pakistan)	2013–2015	BBL03/1	12	143	42	14.30	115.32	1	–	11	3/37	24.00	7.54	19.09	
25	Joe Mennie	(Australia)	2013–2015	BBL03/1	6	7	4	2.33	46.66	1	–	6	3/20	28.00	9.33	18.00	
26	Cameron Boyce	(Australia)	2014–2018	BBL03/5	40	89	24*	8.09	115.58	7	–	43	3/11	25.74	8.23	18.76	
27	Dimitri Mascarenhas	(England)	2014	BBL03/8	4	24	16	12.00	88.88	2	–	5	2/42	29.40	9.18	19.20	
28	Alex Hales	(England)	2014–2015	BBL04/1	5	71	34	14.20	118.33	0	–	–	–	–	–	–	
29	Daren Sammy	(Saint Lucia)	2014–2016	BBL04/1	11	123	38*	24.60	150.00	3	–	3	1/8	73.33	9.16	48.00	
30	Timm van der Gugten	(Netherlands)	2014	BBL04/3	1	9	9*	-	100.00	1	–	0	–	–	10.66	–	
31	Jake Reed	(Australia)	2015–2017	BBL04/4	10	8	8*	-	266.66	2	–	16	4/11	17.31	8.93	11.62	
32	Tim Bresnan	(England)	2015	BBL04/5	4	20	13	6.66	83.33	1	–	4	3/18	29.75	8.50	21.00	
33	Michael Hill	(Australia)	2015–2016	BBL04/6	5	169	64	33.80	127.06	3	–	–	–	–	–	–	
34	Dan Christian	(Australia)	2015–2018	BBL05/1	28	469	58	23.45	141.26	8	–	22	5/14	26.81	8.30	19.36	
35	Sam Rainbird	(Australia)	2015–2017	BBL05/1	7	2	1*	0.66	33.33	3	–	6	3/37	32.33	8.43	23.00	
36	Kumar Sangakkara	(Sri Lanka)	2015–2017	BBL05/1	13	173	43	14.41	120.13	2	–	–	–	–	–	–	
37	Shaun Tait	(Australia)	2015–2017	BBL05/1	12	6	5	3.00	85.71	0	–	14	3/16	28.64	9.25	18.57	
38	Clive Rose	(Australia)	2015–2020	BBL05/2	53	182	32*	18.20	140.00	14	–	27	2/14	43.81	8.11	32.40	
39	Simon Milenko	(Australia)	2016–2020	BBL05/8	36	309	66*	19.31	126.63	12	–	9	3/25	22.55	9.98	13.55	
40	Stuart Broad	(England)	2016–2017	BBL06/1	8	14	11*	14.00	200.00	2	–	8	2/35	30.37	8.23	22.12	
41	Hamish Kingston	(Australia)	2016–2017	BBL06/1	4	29	17	14.50	161.11	1	–	3	2/20	37.00	11.10	20.00	
42	Dom Michael	(Australia) (Samoa)	2016	BBL06/1	2	0	0	0.00	0.00	0	–	–	–	–	–	–	
43	D'Arcy Short	(Australia)	2016–2023	BBL06/1	82	2706	122*	37.06	132.45	38	–	34	5/21	36.70	8.58	25.64	
44	Beau Webster	(Australia)	2017	BBL06/4	5	76	67*	25.33	133.33	3	–	–	–	–	8.00	–	
45	Ben McDermott	(Australia)	2017–2023	BBL06/5	82	2296	127	34.26	139.06	41	3	–	–	–	–	–	
46	Jofra Archer	(England)	2017–2019	BBL07/1	27	61	25*	20.33	141.86	11	–	34	3/15	23.29	7.72	18.08	
47	Alex Doolan	(Australia)	2017–2019	BBL07/1	14	260	70*	23.63	113.04	9	–	–	–	–	–	–	
48	Tymal Mills	(England)	2017–2018	BBL07/1	10	1	1	1.00	14.28	2	–	8	2/42	48.62	9.72	30.00	
49	Aaron Summers	(Australia)	2017	BBL07/1	1	–	–	–	–	0	–	–	–	–	10.33	–	
50	Matthew Wade	(Australia)	2017–2023	BBL07/1	64	1931	130*	33.87	146.06	26	4	–	–	–	–	–	
51	Tom Rogers	(Australia)	2017–2022	BBL07/2	25	76	33*	10.85	96.20	4	–	29	3/24	26.17	8.40	18.68	
52	Nathan Reardon	(Australia)	2018	BBL07/8	3	32	32	32.00	145.45	1	–	-					
53	Riley Meredith	(Australia)	2018–2023	BBL07/SF	59	30	10	4.28	107.14	10	–	80	4/21	21.85	8.05	16.27	
54	Johan Botha	(South Africa) (Australia)	2018–2021	BBL08/1	6	7	4*	-	116.66	7	–	11	3/22	27.45	7.55	21.81	
55	James Faulkner	(Australia)	2018–2020	BBL08/1	25	90	28*	12.85	118.42	4	–	36	3/21	19.05	8.02	14.25	
56	Jake Doran	(Australia)	2019–2020	BBL08/7	4	39	28	13.00	81.25	0	–	–	–	–	–	–	
57	Caleb Jewell	(Australia)	2019–2023	BBL08/8	41	809	70	21.28	128.41	18	–	–	–	–	–	–	
58	David Moody	(Australia)	2019	BBL08/8	5	–	–	–	–	0	–	5	2/27	27.80	9.26	18.00	
59	Jarrod Freeman	(Australia)	2019	BBL08/11	2	–	–	–	–	0	–	1	1/26	37.00	9.25	24.00	
60	Qais Ahmad	(Afghanistan)	2019–2020	BBL08/13	18	31	11*	6.20	79.48	7	–	19	4/12	26.10	8.00	19.57	
61	Nathan Ellis	(Australia)	2019–2023	BBL09/1	51	237	24	11.28	126.06	22	–	61	4/27	25.54	8.23	18.60	
62	David Miller	(South Africa)	2019–2020	BBL09/1	14	198	90*	22.00	131.12	6	–	–	–	–	–	–	
63	Macalister Wright	(Australia)	2019–2023	BBL09/2	11	240	70*	26.66	107.62	8	–	–	–	–	–	–	
64	Scott Boland	(Australia)	2020–2022	BBL09/6	26	37	10	12.33	77.08	3	–	34	4/41	24.23	8.21	17.70	
65	Tim David	(Singapore) (Australia)	2020–2023	BBL10/1	43	851	76*	31.51	159.06	21	–	3	1/4	100.33	8.68	69.33	
66	Peter Handscomb	(Australia)	2020–2022	BBL10/1	27	414	47	19.71	119.30	10	0	–	–	–	–	–	
67	Colin Ingram	(South Africa)	2020–2021	BBL10/1	10	258	55	25.80	127.09	2	–	–	–	–	–	–	
68	Will Jacks	(England)	2020–2021	BBL10/1	8	79	34	9.87	114.49	2	–	1	1/9	35.00	8.75	24.00	
69	Keemo Paul	(Guyana)	2020	BBL10/4	2	8	8	8.00	88.88	0	–	1	1/41	68.00	13.60	30.00	
70	Dawid Malan	(England)	2020–2021	BBL10/5	10	265	75	26.50	113.73	6	–	–	–	–	–	–	
71	Wil Parker	(Australia)	2020–2023	BBL10/5	9	47	25*	11.75	134.28	1	–	1	1/42	185.00	10.27	108.00	
72	Sandeep Lamichhane	(Nepal)	2021–2022	BBL10/7	22	24	13*	24.00	126.31	0	–	22	3/32	29.81	7.70	23.22	
73	Nick Winter	(Australia)	2021	BBL10/9	3	-	0*	0.00	0.00	1	–	–	–	–	8.28	–	
74	Mitchell Owen	(Australia)	2021–2023	BBL10/10	11	50	16	12.50	119.04	1	–	3	2/25	60.66	9.49	38.33	
75	Jordan Cox	(England)	2021	BBL11/1	1	10	10	10.00	83.33	2	–	–	–	–	–	–	
76	Tom Lammonby	(England)	2021–2022	BBL11/1	3	-	0	0.00	0.00	2	–	–	–	–	10.00	–	
77	Joel Paris	(Australia)	2021–2023	BBL11/1	12	53	16*	7.57	112.76	0	–	12	3/35	27.08	8.78	18.50	
78	Josh Kann	(Australia)	2021–2022	BBL11/2	3	–	–	–	–	1	–	1	1/40	76.00	15.20	30.00	
79	Jordan Thompson	(England)	2021–2022	BBL11/2	11	52	15*	7.42	152.94	3	–	8	3/24	21.37	9.00	14.25	
80	Harry Brook	(England)	2021–2022	BBL11/3	7	44	22	6.28	75.86	7	–	–	–	–	–	–	
81	Will Sanders	(Australia)	2022	BBL11/10	2	–	–	–	–	0	–	–	–	–	13.00	–	
82	Asif Ali	(Pakistan)	2022–2023	BBL12/1	10	79	41	9.87	133.89	3	–	–	–	–	–	–	
83	Paddy Dooley	(Australia)	2022–2023	BBL12/1	10	25	10*	25.00	80.64	2	–	19	4/16	12.78	6.56	11.68	
84	Jimmy Neesham	(New Zealand)	2022	BBL12/1	5	62	28	12.40	144.18	2	–	1	1/8	49.00	9.80	30.00	
85	Shadab Khan	(Pakistan)	2022	BBL12/1	5	58	22	11.60	107.40	3	–	7	3/20	20.57	7.57	16.28	
86	Faheem Ashraf	(Pakistan)	2023	BBL12/6	9	61	26	15.25	107.01	5	–	7	2/19	37.71	8.12	27.85	
87	Zak Crawley	(England)	2023	BBL12/7	8	185	54*	26.42	117.83	5	–	–	–	–	–	–	
88	Tom Andrews	(Australia)	2023	BBL12/9	3	27	27	27.00	122.72	0	–	–	–	–	8.60	–	

Source: ESPN Cricinfo Hurricanes Batting records and ESPN Cricinfo Hurricanes Bowling and Fielding records

== See also ==
- List of Big Bash League cricketers
