= Will Prestwidge =

Australian cricketer

- Prestwidge in 2026

Personal information
- Born: 15 January 2002 (age 24)
- Batting: Left-handed
- Bowling: Right-arm fast
- Role: Bowler
- Relatives: Scott Prestwidge (father); Jack Prestwidge (brother); Georgia Prestwidge (sister)

Domestic team information
- Years: Team
- 2021/22: Brisbane Heat (squad no. 8)
- 2021/22: Queensland
- 2024/25–: Tasmania
- 2025/26–: Hobart Hurricanes (squad no. 80)

Career statistics
Competition	FC	LA	T20
Matches	1	11	9
Runs scored	12	235	46
Batting average	12.00	33.57	9.20
100s/50s	0/0	0/1	0/0
Top score	12	71	21
Balls bowled	116	370	117
Wickets	2	7	8
Bowling average	50.50	60.14	24.37
5 wickets in innings	0	0	0
10 wickets in match	0	0	0
Best bowling	2/19	2/19	2/16
Catches/stumpings	0/–	1/–	1/–
- Source: Cricinfo, 25 October 2026

Will Prestwidge (born 15 January 2002) is an Australian cricketer who plays as a bowler. In May 2021, along with fellow player James Bazley, Prestwidge was awarded with a rookie contract with the Queensland cricket team ahead of the 2021-22 domestic cricket season in Australia. Prestwidge also represents the Northern Suburbs District Cricket Club in Queensland Premier Cricket.

== Personal life ==
Several members of Prestwidge's family have played various forms of cricket in Australia. His father, Scott Prestwidge, played domestic cricket for the Queensland Bulls, playing in three first-class and more than fifty List A matches from 1991 to 2001. His brother, Jack Prestwidge, made his List A cricket debut for Queensland in September 2018, and made his Twenty20 debut for the Brisbane Heat in the 2018–19 Big Bash League season in January 2019. He has also played for the Melbourne Renegades, also in the Big Bash League. His sister, Georgia Prestwidge, plays for the Queensland Fire in the Women's National Cricket League (WNCL), making her debut in October 2014, and for the Brisbane Heat in the Women's Big Bash League (WBBL).

== Cricket career ==
In December 2019, Prestwidge was selected to play for the Ponting XII team in a twenty-over match against the Gilchrist XII team. The match was played on 27 December 2019, ahead of the 2019–20 Big Bash League match between the Adelaide Strikers and the Melbourne Stars at the Metricon Stadium in the Gold Coast.

Ahead of the 2021–22 Big Bash League season, Prestwidge was signed by the Brisbane Heat to play in the tournament. Prestwidge was brought into the squad as an injury replacement for fellow fast-bowler Matt Willans, who was ruled out the tournament after undergoing surgery for a shoulder reconstruction. Prestwidge was also included in Queensland's squad for the 2021–22 Marsh One-Day Cup, Australia's domestic List A cricket competition.

During December 2021 and January 2022, the 2021–22 Big Bash League cricket tournament was impacted with multiple cases of COVID-19 being reported across several of the competing teams. One of the teams to be severely affected by the outbreak was the Brisbane Heat. As a result, only three players in the Heat's original squad were available for their match against the Melbourne Renegades at the GMHBA Stadium in Geelong on 6 January 2022. With twelve players ruled out of the match due to COVID, the Brisbane Heat assembled a new squad for the match, with as many as ten players in line to make their debut, including Prestwidge. Therefore, Prestwidge, along with Jack Clayton, David Grant, Ronan McDonald, Steve McGiffin and Lachlan Pfeffer all made their Twenty20 debuts in the match for the Heat. In the match, Prestwidge finished not out at the end of the Heat's innings, scoring two runs, with the team making 128/6 from their twenty overs. He also bowled two overs, but did not take any wickets, and conceded twenty-two runs, with the Melbourne Renegades winning the match by five wickets with five overs to spare. Two days later, in the Heat's match against the Hobart Hurricanes, Prestwidge took his first wicket, dismissing Caleb Jewell. He also dismissed Ben McDermott, to finish the match with figures of 2/37.

He made his List A debut on 23 February 2022, for Queensland in the 2021–22 Marsh One-Day Cup.
