= Cricket Superstar =

- Genre: Reality
- Developed by: North One Television Australia
- Presented by: Lee Furlong
- Judges: Allan Border
- Country of origin: Australia
- Original language: English
- No. of seasons: 1
- No. of episodes: 12

Production
- Production locations: Brisbane, Queensland
- Running time: 60 minutes

Original release
- Network: Fox8
- Release: 4 January 2012 – present

Related
- Football Superstar; The Recruit

Cricket Superstar is an Australian cricket-based reality television series that aired on Fox8 in 2012. Working on a weekly elimination format (known on the show as dismissals), the winner received a rookie contract with his state and a scholarship to the Cricket Centre of Excellence. The winner was 21-year-old Victorian, Ian Holland.

== Season One (2012) ==
The series was hosted by Lee Furlong. Former Australian captain Allan Border was the chief judge and Graham Manou was the mentor. It was filmed in Brisbane and featured guest appearances by current and former players including Matthew Hayden and Ricky Ponting.

It first aired on 4 January 2012.

=== Contestants ===
The final squad of 15 players was selected from 60 finalists, from over 1000 applicants. The prize for the winner was a rookie contract with their state association for the 2012/13 season and a four-month scholarship at the Cricket Centre of Excellence in Brisbane.

Name	Date of birth	State	Main skill	Comments	References
Ian Holland	3 October 1990	Vic	All-rounder	Winner	Fox8, ESPN, CA
Dave Vernon	27 September 1990	WA	Pace bowler	Runner-up	Fox8, ESPN, CA
James Moss	19 November 1989	SA	Batsman	Dismissed in week 10; Was rookie listed by Adelaide (AFL) in 2008 & 2009	Fox8, ESPN, CA
Ben Cooper	10 February 1992	Tas	Batsman	Dismissed in week 9 Brother of Tom Cooper, both Ben and Tom have played international cricket for the Netherlands cricket team	Fox8, ESPN
Jake Fawcett	22 March 1990	WA	Batsman	Dismissed in week 8 Has played List-A cricket for Western Australia	Fox8, ESPN, CA
Josh Clarke	14 December 1992	NSW	All-rounder	Dismissed in week 8	Fox8, ESPN
Chris Chellew	14 September 1990	WA	All-rounder	Withdrew due to injury in week 8	Fox8, ESPN, CA
Justin Avendano	11 August 1993	NSW	Batsman	Dismissed in week 6	Fox8
Richard Potter	12 September 1993	NSW	Wicket-keeper	Dismissed in week 6	Fox8
Mason Crozier	24 November 1991	Vic	Pace bowler	Dismissed in week 6 Brother of Fremantle footballer Hayden Crozier	Fox8
Alex Frick	14 May 1992	SA	Pace bowler	Dismissed in week 5 (injury); Son of John Frick	Fox8
Sam Brandon	19 November 1991	Qld	Pace bowler	Dismissed in week 4	Fox8
Jake Scicluna	6 October 1994	NSW	Batsman	Dismissed in week 3	Fox8
Cameron Williams	18 November 1991	SA	Spin bowler	Dismissed in week 3. Has played First Class for South Australia	Fox8, ESPN, CA
Jackson Smith	30 November 1992	Qld	Pace bowler	Dismissed in week 2	Fox8
