= Justin Avendano =

Australian cricketer (born 1993)

Personal information
- Full name: Justin Avendano
- Born: 11 August 1993 (age 33)
- Nickname: Avocado
- Batting: Right-handed
- Bowling: Right-arm off break
- Role: Batsman

Domestic team information
- Years: Team
- 2018/19–2020/21: Sydney Sixers (squad no. 32)
- 2021/22: Melbourne Stars

Career statistics
Competition	T20
Matches	19
Runs scored	251
Batting average	14.76
100s/50s	0/1
Top score	52
Catches/stumpings	0/–
- Source: Cricinfo, 28 January 2022

Justin Avendano (born 11 August 1993) is an Australian cricketer who has represented the Sydney Sixers and the Melbourne Stars in the Big Bash League.

Avendano plays club cricket for North Sydney and for the Cricket NSW High Performance Transition Academy squad. In 2012 featured on the FOX Sports reality show Cricket Superstar. Avendano is a big hitting batsman and in a Sydney Sixers Academy match in November 2018 against Auckland at the Hurtsville Oval, his innings of 122 from 63 balls included hitting the maximum 6 sixes in one single 6-ball over. Avendano also hit a century opening the batting in a development game for the Sixers Academy against the Lahore Qalanders at the Blacktown International Sports Park in October 2017.

He made his Twenty20 debut for Sydney Sixers in the 2018–19 Big Bash League season on 1 January 2019.

In January 2022, Avendano was called up into the Melbourne Stars squad for the 2021–22 Big Bash.
