= Josh Kann =

Australian cricketer (born 1999)

Personal information
- Born: 15 November 1999 (age 26)

Career statistics
Competition	T20
Matches	3
Runs scored	-
Batting average	-
100s/50s	-
Top score	-
Balls bowled	30
Wickets	1
Bowling average	76.00
5 wickets in innings	0
10 wickets in match	0
Best bowling	1/40
Catches/stumpings	1/–
- Source: Cricinfo, 22 October 2022

Josh Kann (born 15 November 1999) is an Australian cricketer. He made his Twenty20 debut on 11 December 2021, for the Hobart Hurricanes in the 2021–22 Big Bash League season.
