= Xavier Crone =

Australian cricketer (born 1997)

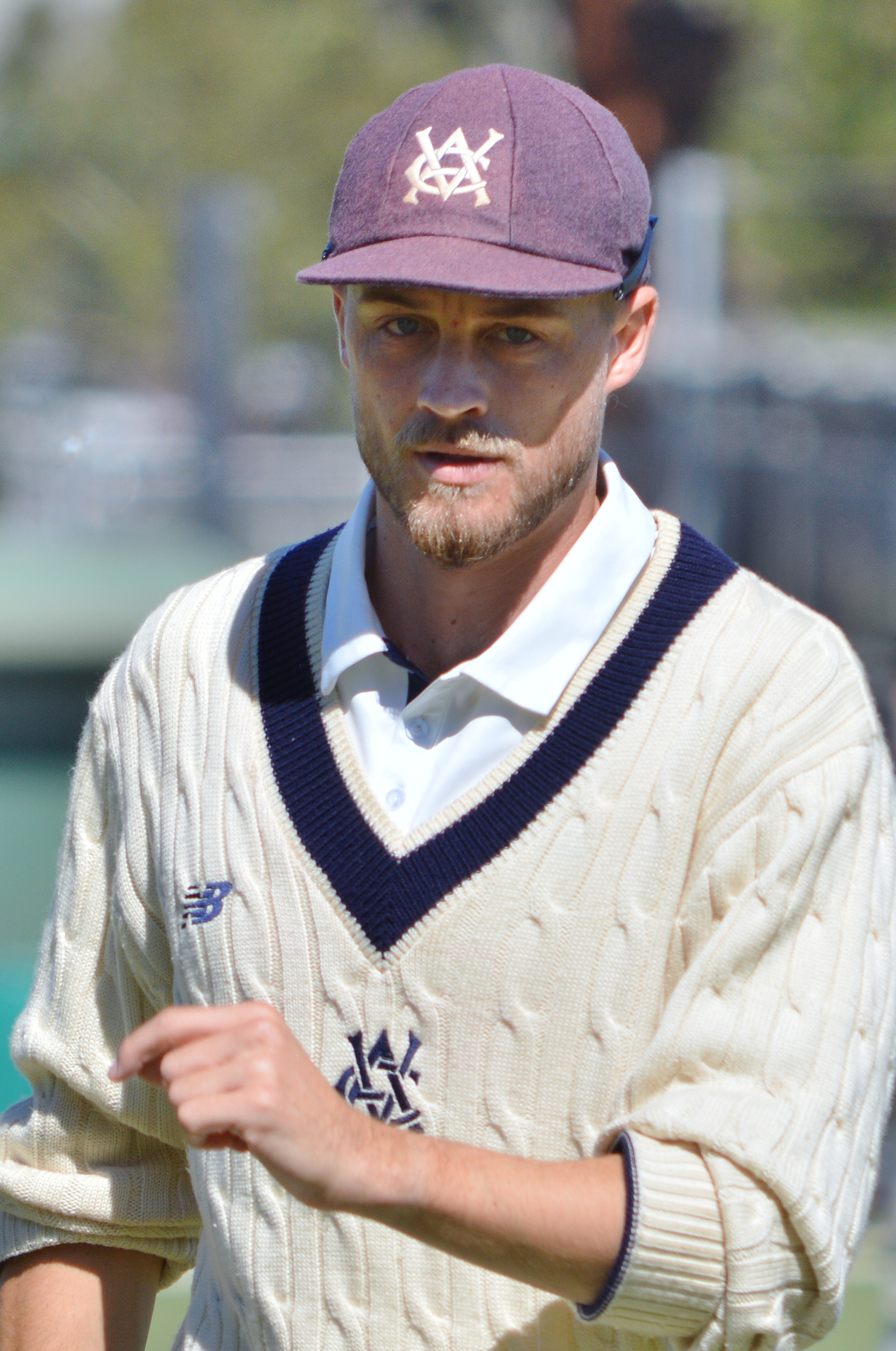
- Crone playing First Class cricket with Victoria in March 2026

Personal information
- Full name: Xavier Alexander Crone
- Born: 19 December 1997 (age 28); Strathfieldsaye, Victoria
- Batting: Right-handed
- Bowling: Right-arm fast-medium
- Role: All-rounder

Domestic team information
- Years: Team
- 2019/20–2025/26: Victoria (squad no. 26)
- 2021/22: Melbourne Stars
- 2024/25: Melbourne Renegades (squad no. 26)

Career statistics
Competition	FC	LA	T20
Matches	6	12	3
Runs scored	175	62	2
Batting average	25.00	8.85	1.00
100s/50s	0/1	0/0	0/0
Top score	62*	19	1
Balls bowled	974	522	30
Wickets	18	15	0
Bowling average	33.38	39.62	–
5 wickets in innings	0	0	–
10 wickets in match	0	0	–
Best bowling	4/68	4/61	–
Catches/stumpings	2/–	5/–	0/–
- Source: Cricinfo, 25 February 2026

Xavier Alexander Crone (born 19 December 1997) is a former Australian professional cricketer. He made his List A debut on 23 October 2019, for Victoria in the 2019–20 Marsh One-Day Cup. He made his first-class debut on 20 November 2021, for Victoria in the 2021–22 Sheffield Shield season.

Crone made his Twenty20 debut for the Melbourne Stars against the Perth Scorchers at the Junction Oval on 2 January 2022, being called into the squad for the 2021–22 Big Bash after several members of the original squad became unavailable due to a COVID-19 outbreak.
