= Syed Faridoun =

Pakistani cricketer (born 2001)

Personal information
- Born: 15 May 2001 (age 25); Lahore, Punjab, Pakistan
- Batting: Right-handed
- Bowling: Left-arm chinaman
- Role: Bowler

Domestic team information
- Years: Team
- 2021/22: Melbourne Stars
- 2022; 2024-present: Lahore Qalandars (squad no. 257)

Career statistics
Competition	T20
Matches	1
Runs scored	6
Batting average	–
100s/50s	0/0
Top score	6*
Balls bowled	24
Wickets	0
Bowling average	–
5 wickets in innings	0
10 wickets in match	0
Best bowling	–
Catches/stumpings	0/–
- Source: Cricinfo, 22 October 2022

Syed Faridoun (born 15 May 2001) is a Pakistani cricketer. He made his Twenty20 debut on 5 December 2021, for the Melbourne Stars in the 2021–22 Big Bash League season.
