= Brody Couch =

Australian cricketer (born 1999)

Personal information
- Full name: Brody Louis Couch
- Born: 5 December 1999 (age 26); New York, United States
- Batting: Left-handed
- Bowling: Right-arm fast
- Role: Bowler

Domestic team information
- Years: Team
- 2020/21-2021/22: Victoria (squad no. 24)
- 2021/22-2022/23: Melbourne Stars (squad no. 24)
- 2024–present: San Francisco Unicorns (squad no. 24)
- 2024/25–present: Western Australia (squad no. 15)
- 2025/26–: Perth Scorchers (squad no. 15)

Career statistics
Competition	FC	LA	T20
Matches	14	13	55
Runs scored	158	74	185
Batting average	10.53	12.33	18.50
100s/50s	0/0	0/0	0/0
Top score	31	39	43
Balls bowled	2,021	606	994
Wickets	43	18	52
Bowling average	28.02	33.55	28.88
5 wickets in innings	0	0	0
10 wickets in match	0	0	0
Best bowling	4/33	3/45	3/30
Catches/stumpings	5/–	7/–	14/–
- Source: ESPNcricinfo, 25 October 2026

Brody Louis Couch (born 5 December 1999) is an American-Australian cricketer. A right-arm fast bowler, he is capable of bowling speeds upwards of 90 mph (144.84 km/h). He currently plays for Western Australia, the San Francisco Unicorns and the Perth Scorchers.

== Career ==
He made his List A debut for Victoria in the 2020–21 Marsh One-Day Cup on 10 March 2021. He made his first-class debut on 20 November 2021 for Victoria in the 2021–22 Sheffield Shield season. He made his Twenty20 debut on 5 December 2021 for the Melbourne Stars in the 2021–22 Big Bash League season.

In 2023, Couch was drafted into the San Francisco Unicorns squad for the 2023 Major League Cricket season as a local player.

In April 2024, Couch was named as part of Western Australia's squad for the 2024/25 domestic season. On 4 November 2024, he became the first Western Australian player to take a hat-trick in the Sheffield Shield by dismissing Jake Doran, Lawrence Neil-Smith and Kieran Elliott in consecutive deliveries.

Couch joined the Perth Scorchers in 2025. He was part of the Scorchers' XI that won the championship title of BBL 15.
