= Ben Dwarshuis =

Australian cricketer (born 1994)

- Dwarshuis in 2026

Personal information
- Full name: Benjamin James Dwarshuis
- Born: 23 June 1994 (age 32); Kareela, New South Wales, Australia
- Height: 1.91 m (6 ft 3 in)
- Batting: Left-handed
- Bowling: Left-arm fast-medium
- Role: Bowler

International information
- National side: Australia (2022–present)
- ODI debut (cap 248): 19 September 2024 v England
- Last ODI: 14 June 2026 v Bangladesh
- ODI shirt no.: 82
- T20I debut: 5 April 2022 v Pakistan
- Last T20I: 21 November 2026 v England
- T20I shirt no.: 82

Domestic team information
- Years: Team
- 2014/15–present: Sydney Sixers
- 2016/17–present: New South Wales
- 2021, 2025: Worcestershire
- 2022, 2026: Birmingham Phoenix
- 2024: Durham
- 2024: Northern Superchargers
- 2025: Islamabad United
- 2026: Punjab Kings
- 2023, 2026: Washington Freedom

Career statistics
Competition	ODI	T20I	FC	LA
Matches	7	16	13	36
Runs scored	65	64	432	370
Batting average	16.25	8.00	25.41	17.61
100s/50s	0/0	0/0	0/2	0/0
Top score	33	17	60*	44
Balls bowled	342	354	2,155	1,659
Wickets	12	23	38	60
Bowling average	27.08	24.30	35.92	24.96
5 wickets in innings	0	0	0	0
10 wickets in match	0	0	0	0
Best bowling	3/47	4/36	4/48	4/39
Catches/stumpings	1/–	1/–	2/–	16/–
- Source: ESPNcricinfo, 22 November 2026

Benjamin James Dwarshuis (born 23 June 1994) is an Australian cricketer who represents Australia in limited overs cricket as a left-arm fast-medium bowler. He plays for the and for New South Wales in domestic cricket, Sydney Sixers in the Big Bash League, Washington Freedom in Major League Cricket and Punjab Kings in the Indian Premier League.

== Early life and family ==
Dwarshuis was born on 23 June 1994 in Kareela, New South Wales to an Australian family of Dutch descent.

Dwarshuis is married to Courtney Bridge.

Dwarshuis attended Heathcote High School in the Sutherland Shire.

== Career ==
He made his List A debut for New South Wales in the 2016–17 Matador BBQs One-Day Cup on 7 October 2016.

In January 2018, he was named in Australia's Twenty20 International (T20I) squad for the 2017–18 Trans-Tasman Tri-Series. Later the same month, he was bought by the Kings XI Punjab in the 2018 IPL auction. In March 2021, Dwarshuis was signed by Worcestershire County Cricket Club to play in the 2021 T20 Blast tournament in England.

On 13 September 2021, Dwarshuis was included in the Delhi Capitals squad for the second phase of the 2021 IPL in the United Arab Emirates, as a replacement player for Chris Woakes. In January 2022, in the 2021–22 Big Bash League season, Dwarshuis took his maiden five-wicket haul in T20 cricket.

In February 2022, Dwarshuis was named in Australia's Twenty20 International (T20I) squad for their one-off match against Pakistan. He made his T20I debut on 5 April 2022, for Australia against Pakistan.

Dwarshuis made his first-class debut for New South Wales on 3 October 2022, against Western Australia in the 2022–23 Sheffield Shield season.

In November 2023, he was selected in Australia's squad for the 5-match T20 series against India. In the 4th T20I against India, he picked up 3 wickets for 40 runs off his 4 overs.

In December 2024, Dwarshuis signed for a second spell with Worcestershire, agreeing a deal to play for the club in the 2025 T20 Blast.

In January 2026, Dwarshuis was selected in Australia's squad for the 2026 Men's T20 World Cup, replacing the injured Pat Cummins. He played one game against Zimbabwe, in which he conceded 40 runs off his 4 overs and did not take any wickets. He did not play in the tournament again.

In May 2026, Dwarshuis was signed by the Indian Premier League (IPL) for the Punjab Kings (PBKS) as a replacement for Lockie Ferguson. He played one match against the Delhi Capitals (DC) and bowled an expensive spell of 51 runs in 4 overs, picking up only 1 wicket.
