= List of Big Bash League cricketers =

This is a list of cricketers who played for different teams of Big Bash League.

== See also ==
- List of Women's Big Bash League cricketers
