= Patrick Rowe (cricketer) =

Australian cricketer (born 2001)

Personal information
- Full name: Patrick Justin Rowe
- Born: 28 January 2001 (age 25); Randwick, New South Wales, Australia
- Batting: Right-handed
- Role: Wicket-keeper

Domestic team information
- Years: Team
- 2023/24: Mid West Rhinos

Career statistics
Competition	FC	LA	T20
Matches	6	3	1
Runs scored	163	1	3
Batting average	27.16	0.50	3.00
100s/50s	0/2	0/0	0/0
Top score	72	1	3
Catches/stumpings	4/0	3/1	0/1
- Source: Cricinfo, 18 June 2025

Patrick Justin Rowe (born 28 January 2001) is an Australian cricketer. A right-handed batsman and wicket-keeper, Rowe plays for St Kilda Cricket Club and is a member of the Victoria squad.

Rowe made his first-class debut on 11 December 2020 for Australia A as a concussion substitute for Cameron Green against a touring India side at the SCG after Green was struck on the head in his follow-through whilst bowling from a drive by Jasprit Bumrah. Prior to his first-class debut, he was named in Australia's squads for the 2018 Under-19 Cricket World Cup and the 2020 Under-19 Cricket World Cup. He made his Twenty20 debut on 3 January 2022, for the Melbourne Stars in the 2021–22 Big Bash League season.

In late 2023 Rowe began playing in Zimbabwe for the Mid West Rhinos.
