= Clint Hinchliffe =

Australian cricketer (born 1996)

Personal information
- Full name: Clinton Desmond Hinchliffe
- Born: 23 October 1996 (age 30); Duncraig, Western Australia
- Batting: Left-handed
- Bowling: Slow left-arm unorthodox
- Role: All-rounder

Domestic team information
- Years: Team
- 2017/18: Western Australia
- 2017/18: Cricket Australia XI (squad no. 2)
- 2018/19: Perth Scorchers (squad no. 23)
- 2019/20–: Melbourne Stars (squad no. 23)
- List A debut: 16 August 2016 National Performance Squad v Australia A

Career statistics
Competition	FC	LA	T20
Matches	1	10	27
Runs scored	1	228	98
Batting average	0.50	25.33	8.90
100s/50s	0/0	0/0	0/0
Top score	1	49	25*
Balls bowled	36	198	360
Wickets	1	6	19
Bowling average	14.00	35.33	25.42
5 wickets in innings	0	0	0
10 wickets in match	0	0	0
Best bowling	1/14	4/71	3/19
Catches/stumpings	0/–	2/–	9/–
- Source: ESPNcricinfo, 15 January 2022

Clinton Desmond Hinchliffe (born 23 October 1996) is an Australian cricketer and Australian rules footballer, currently playing for the Swan Districts Football Club in the West Australian Football League. He is a left-handed batsman and left-arm unorthodox bowler. He made his List A debut for the National Performance Squad against Australia A on 16 August 2016. He also played in a tour match for the Western Australia XI against England prior to the 2017–18 Ashes series.

== Domestic career ==
Hinchliffe played both cricket and Australian rules football growing up, being good enough in the latter to play for Western Australia in the 2015 AFL Under 18 Championships. He was named as one of his side's best players in their loss to Vic Metro. He also played juniors and WAFL reserves for West Perth.

Hinchliffe was in the Cricket Australia XI squad for the 2017–18 JLT One-Day Cup. He took his career best figures of 4/71 in the 11th match against New South Wales in a 93-run loss. He played all six matches for Cricket Australia XI, scoring 150 runs and taking 6 wickets, the most wickets of anyone in the squad.

He made his first-class debut for Western Australia in the 2017–18 Sheffield Shield season on 16 February 2018. He made his Twenty20 debut for the Perth Scorchers in the 2018–19 Big Bash League season on 1 February 2019.

== Personal life ==
Away from his own sport's career, Hinchliffe co-owns the Seamer Indoor Sports Centre, in the Perth suburb of Balcatta.
