= Will Sanders (cricketer) =

Australian cricketer

Personal information
- Full name: Will Sanders
- Batting: Right-handed
- Bowling: Right-arm fast
- Role: Bowler

Domestic team information
- Years: Team
- 2021/22: Hobart Hurricanes
- Source: Cricinfo, 21 January 2022

Will Sanders is an Australian cricketer. On 7 January 2022, Sanders was added to the Hobart Hurricanes squad for the 2021-22 Big Bash League season as a COVID-19 replacement. He made his Twenty20 debut for the Hobart Hurricanes on 8 January 2022.
