= James Seymour (Australian cricketer) =

Australian cricketer (born 1992)

Personal information
- Full name: James Lewis Seymour
- Born: 13 March 1992 (age 34)
- Batting: Left-handed
- Bowling: Right arm off break
- Role: Batsmen

Domestic team information
- Years: Team
- 2020/21–2023/24: Victoria
- 2021/22: Melbourne Renegades
- 2022/23: Melbourne Stars

Career statistics
Competition	FC	LA	T20
Matches	5	5	14
Runs scored	254	86	154
Batting average	28.22	21.50	15.40
100s/50s	1/1	0/1	0/0
Top score	105	51	25
Balls bowled	24	–	30
Wickets	0	–	0
Bowling average	–	–	–
5 wickets in innings	–	–	–
10 wickets in match	–	–	–
Best bowling	–	–	–
Catches/stumpings	5/–	1/–	0/–
- Source: Cricinfo, 10 October 2025

James Lewis Seymour (born 13 March 1992) is an Australian cricketer. He made his first-class debut on 3 April 2021, for Victoria in the 2020–21 Sheffield Shield season. He made his List A debut on 8 April 2021, for Victoria in the 2020–21 Marsh One-Day Cup. In November 2021, in the 2021–22 Sheffield Shield season, Seymour scored his maiden century in first-class cricket. He made his Twenty20 debut on 7 December 2021, for the Melbourne Renegades in the 2021–22 Big Bash League season.
