= Nick Larkin =

Australian cricketer (born 1990)

Personal information
- Full name: Nicholas Christopher Richard Larkin
- Born: 1 May 1990 (age 36); New South Wales, Australia
- Batting: Right-handed
- Role: Batsman

International information
- National side: Ireland (2014)

Domestic team information
- Years: Team
- 2013–2014: Northern Knights
- 2014/15–2021/22: New South Wales (squad no. 36)
- 2015/16: Sydney Sixers (squad no. 36)
- 2018/19–2023/24: Melbourne Stars (squad no. 36)

Career statistics
Competition	FC	LA	T20
Matches	43	12	58
Runs scored	2,121	151	1069
Batting average	29.05	15.10	30.54
100s/50s	4/8	0/0	0/6
Top score	175*	36	83*
Catches/stumpings	43/—	3/–	23/–
- Source: ESPNcricinfo, 5 January 2026

Nicholas Christopher Richard Larkin (born 1 May 1990) is a former Australian cricketer. He played domestic cricket in Australia for New South Wales and in the Big Bash League for the Sydney Sixers and Melbourne Stars, and briefly represented Ireland in international cricket in 2014.

== Cricket career ==
Possessing an Irish passport from his mother's side of the family, Larkin played club cricket in Ireland for two years in 2013 and 2014, playing for the Northern Knights. In 2014 he also represented Ireland in two List A games against Sri Lanka A in the lead-up to the 2015 Cricket World Cup. After the 2014 season, he returned to Australia and began playing first-class cricket for New South Wales in the Sheffield Shield, making his debut for the side on 31 October 2014. He scored a century in his second match, and earned a contract with New South Wales for the following 2015–16 season. He would later rule himself out of a return for Ireland, turning down and opportunity to join their squad for an Intercontinental Cup match and focusing instead on advancing his career in New South Wales.

During his time playing for New South Wales, Larkin also became the captain of Sydney University Cricket Club in NSW Premier Cricket, and he won the award for captain of the year twice in 2017 and 2018.

In the 2020–21 Sheffield Shield season, despite playing in seven matches for New South Wales, he was dropped ahead of the final, and was subsequently cut from New South Wales' list of contracted players for the 2021–22 season.

== Big Bash League ==
On 10 January 2016 Larkin made his Twenty20 debut for the Sydney Sixers in the 2015–16 Big Bash League season, but he didn't play another match for the season and his contract with the team was not renewed. Later, he joined the Melbourne Stars as a replacement for the injured Nic Maddinson, making his debut for the side on 21 December 2018.

Larkin struggled to establish himself as a mainstay at the Stars, but had his breakout towards the end of the 2019–20 season. After being omitted from the Stars' lineup for the first three matches and recording a golden duck in the fourth, he scored his maiden half-century against the Sydney Thunder on 2 January 2020 and was named the player of the match. In the Challenger (a knockout match), he scored his personal best of 83 runs not out and was named the player of the match a second time, helping the Stars to reach the final.

In 2024, Larkin retired from cricket, ending his career with the Melbourne Stars.
