= Tom O'Connell (cricketer) =

Australian cricketer (born 2000)

Personal information
- Full name: Thomas O'Connell
- Born: 14 June 2000 (age 26)
- Batting: Right-handed
- Bowling: Right-arm leg break
- Role: Bowling all-rounder

Domestic team information
- Years: Team
- 2018–: Victoria
- 2019–2022: Melbourne Stars
- 2024–: Chittagong Kings

Career statistics
Competition	List A	T20
Matches	4	8
Runs scored	34	12
Batting average	8.50	6.00
100s/50s	0/0	0/0
Top score	22	9*
Balls bowled	186	84
Wickets	8	5
Bowling average	25.12	22.40
5 wickets in innings	0	0
10 wickets in match	0	0
Best bowling	3/56	2/11
Catches/stumpings	2/–	3/–
- Source: Cricinfo, 19 June 2022

Tom O'Connell (born 14 June 2000) is an Australian cricketer from Geelong, Victoria who plays as a bowling all-rounder, bowling right-arm leg spin.

He made his List A debut for Victoria in the 2018–19 JLT One-Day Cup on 16 September 2018. He made his Twenty20 debut for the Melbourne Stars in the 2018–19 Big Bash League season on 14 January 2019.

O'Connell was included in the Chittagong Kings squad ahead of the 2025 Bangladesh Premier League.
