= Ronan McDonald =

Australian cricketer (born 1992)

Personal information
- Full name: Ronan Henry McDonald
- Born: 30 June 1992 (age 34); Brisbane, Queensland, Australia
- Batting: Right-handed
- Bowling: Right-arm fast-medium
- Role: Bowler

Domestic team information
- Years: Team
- 2012/13: Queensland
- 2021/22: Brisbane Heat (squad no. 78)

Career statistics
Competition	FC	T20
Matches	2	1
Runs scored	29	-
Batting average	14.50	-
100s/50s	0/0	-
Top score	18	-
Balls bowled	336	12
Wickets	5	1
Bowling average	40.40	21.00
5 wickets in innings	0	0
10 wickets in match	0	0
Best bowling	2/134	1/21
Catches/stumpings	3/–	1/–
- Source: Cricinfo, 6 January 2022

Ronan McDonald (born 30 June 1992) is an Australian cricketer. He played in two first-class matches for Queensland in 2013. On 6 January 2022, McDonald was added to the Brisbane Heat squad for the 2021–22 Big Bash League season after 12 players were ruled out with COVID-19. He made his Twenty20 debut later the same day, for the Brisbane Heat.

== See also ==
- List of Queensland first-class cricketers
