= Lachlan Pfeffer =

Australian cricketer (born 1991)

Personal information
- Born: 8 April 1991 (age 35)
- Batting: Left-handed
- Role: Wicket-keeper

Domestic team information
- Years: Team
- 2017/18―2019/20: Queensland (squad no. 33)

Career statistics
| Competition | FC | LA | T20 |
|---|---|---|---|
| Matches | 6 | 1 | 4 |
| Runs scored | 214 | 4 | 109 |
| Batting average | 19.45 | 4.00 | 27.25 |
| 100s/50s | 0/1 | 0/0 | 0/1 |
| Top score | 50 | 4 | 69 |
| Catches/stumpings | 4/– | 1/1 | 2/– |
- Source: Cricinfo, 16 January 2022

Lachlan Pfeffer (born 8 April 1991) is an Australian cricketer. He made his first-class debut for Queensland in the 2017–18 Sheffield Shield season on 8 February 2018. He made his List A debut for Queensland in the 2018–19 JLT One-Day Cup on 16 September 2018. He made his Twenty20 debut on 6 January 2022, for the Brisbane Heat in the 2021–22 Big Bash League season.
