= Steve McGiffin =

Australian cricketer (born 1997)

Personal information
- Full name: Steven McGiffin
- Born: 16 April 1997 (age 29)
- Batting: Right-handed
- Bowling: Right-arm medium-fast
- Role: Allrounder

Domestic team information
- Years: Team
- 2021/22: Brisbane Heat (squad no. 99)

Career statistics
Competition	T20
Matches	2
Runs scored	20
Batting average	20.00
100s/50s	0/0
Top score	14*
Balls bowled	12
Wickets	0
Bowling average	-
5 wickets in innings	0
10 wickets in match	0
Best bowling	-
Catches/stumpings	1/–
- Source: Cricinfo, 6 January 2022

Steve McGiffin (born 16 April 1997) is an Australian cricket player from the Western Suburbs of Brisbane. On 6 January 2022, McGiffin was added to the Brisbane Heat squad for the 2021-22 Big Bash League season after 12 players were ruled out with COVID-19. He made his Twenty20 debut for the Brisbane Heat against the Melbourne Renegades on 6 January 2022 at GMHBA Stadium. On 26 February 2023, he made his List A debut for the Queensland against the New South Wales in the 2022–23 Marsh One-Day Cup.
