= David Grant (cricketer) =

Australian cricketer (born 1997)

Personal information
- Full name: David Malcolm Kerr Grant
- Born: 24 March 1997 (age 29); Adelaide, South Australia
- Batting: Right-handed
- Bowling: Right-arm medium-fast
- Role: Bowler

Domestic team information
- Years: Team
- 2016–present: South Australia
- 2017–present: Cricket Australia XI

Career statistics
| Competition | FC | LA | T20 |
|---|---|---|---|
| Matches | 15 | 8 | 2 |
| Runs scored | 84 | 20 | 1 |
| Batting average | 7.63 | 20.00 | – |
| 100s/50s | 0/0 | 0/0 | 0/0 |
| Top score | 14 | 9 | 1* |
| Balls bowled | 2,939 | 384 | 48 |
| Wickets | 39 | 9 | 3 |
| Bowling average | 39.12 | 42.66 | 16.00 |
| 5 wickets in innings | 0 | 0 | 0 |
| 10 wickets in match | 0 | 0 | 0 |
| Best bowling | 4/38 | 4/31 | 3/20 |
| Catches/stumpings | 5/– | 2/– | 0/– |
- Source: ESPNcricinfo, 9 October 2022

David Malcolm Kerr Grant (born 24 May 1997) is an Australian cricketer from North Adelaide, South Australia. He is a right-handed batsman and bowls right-arm medium-fast, basing his bowling style on former Test cricketer Glenn McGrath. Grant has played internationally for Australia's national under-19 team and currently plays domestically for South Australia.

== Youth career (2014–2016) ==
When Grant started playing cricket, he decided to model himself after the Australian Test bowler Glenn McGrath, who was dominating world cricket at the time. Rather than trying to bowl as quickly as he could, McGrath focused on movement off the seam and consistently bowling the ball in the right place, so Grant followed the same suit in his own bowling. While he was still a teenager, Grant started to play cricket for Australia's national under-19 team, making his Youth One Day International (ODI) debut in 2014 against Sri Lanka. The second innings of the match was washed out and Grant did not get an opportunity to bowl. During 2015 Grant spent the winter training at the National Cricket Centre in Brisbane, and during his time there he also got to spend time training under Glenn McGrath at India's MRF Pace Foundation. Grant described this experience as "definitely the highlight" of his career to that point.

Grant was selected to play for Australia later in the winter in England. He played Youth Test matches against England and took part in a Youth ODI series against them as well, with a highlight performance in the third match, taking three wickets in consecutive overs with spearing yorkers. After strong performances for Australia in a variety of conditions, he was selected to play for South Australia in the national under-19 championships at the end of 2016. Overall, Grant played two Youth Tests and nine Youth ODIs.

== Domestic career (2016–present) ==
In September 2016 Grant represented the National Performance Squad team in the Quadrangular Tournament, with Australia A, India A and South Africa A being the other three teams. During the tournament, he made his List A cricket debut against South Africa A and was a standout performer with bowling figures of four wickets for 31 runs to help the National Performance Squad to a 17-run victory, bowling out South Africa A for 226.

Grant was given a rookie contract with South Australia's state cricket team for the 2016–17 season and, because he was not selected to play for South Australia in the 2016–17 Matador BBQs One-Day Cup, he was part of the Cricket Australia XI squad for the tournament instead, along with a number of people he'd played and trained with in the National Performance Squad. Later in the season, he was also given an opportunity to make his first-class cricket debut when he was named in South Australia's 12-man squad for two consecutive matches in the 2016–17 Sheffield Shield season. His debut came against New South Wales on 5 December 2017. He took two wickets for 55 runs in his first bowling innings. In March, Grant suffered a foot stress fracture, meaning he couldn't play for South Australia for the rest of the season, but he was still upgraded from his rookie contract to a full contract with South Australia for the next season.

== Player profile ==
Grant is a tall pace bowler. As he has based his playing style on McGrath, Grant does not focus on bowling very quickly. He is a seam bowler who works on getting the ball in the right place and only bowls at speeds of around 125 km/h (78 mph), though South Australian Cricket Association high-performance manager Tim Nielsen has said he is capable of getting into the 130's. Nielsen has also said that he is similar to fellow Redbacks bowler Chadd Sayers, but as he is taller and potentially faster, he could become more like Australian Test bowler Josh Hazlewood with time. His experience on pitches around the world from a young age have given him more experience in different conditions and helped his development.
