= Tom Rogers (cricketer, born 1994) =

Australian cricketer (born 1994)

Personal information
- Full name: Thomas Stewart Rogers
- Born: 3 March 1994 (age 32); Bruce, Australian Capital Territory
- Batting: Left-handed
- Bowling: Right-arm medium-fast
- Role: Bowling all-rounder

Domestic team information
- Years: Team
- 2017/18–: Tasmania (squad no. 6)
- 2017/18–2021/22: Hobart Hurricanes (squad no. 6)
- 2022/23–: Melbourne Renegades (squad no. 8)
- 2024–2025: Kent (squad no. 8)
- 2024/25: Pretoria Capitals

Career statistics
| Competition | FC | LA | T20 |
|---|---|---|---|
| Matches | 15 | 35 | 85 |
| Runs scored | 365 | 299 | 396 |
| Batting average | 17.38 | 16.61 | 14.66 |
| 100s/50s | 0/1 | 0/0 | 0/0 |
| Top score | 80 | 38 | 49* |
| Balls bowled | 1,948 | 1,651 | 1,780 |
| Wickets | 47 | 52 | 98 |
| Bowling average | 22.31 | 28.75 | 26.27 |
| 5 wickets in innings | 0 | 1 | 1 |
| 10 wickets in match | 0 | 0 | 0 |
| Best bowling | 4/9 | 5/32 | 5/16 |
| Catches/stumpings | 3/– | 17/– | 36/– |
- Source: Cricinfo, 25 October 2026

Thomas Stewart Rogers (born 3 March 1994) is an Australian cricketer. He is a right-arm fast bowler.

Rogers was in the Futures League for the ACT Comets from the 2013–14 season to the 2016–17 season. He was offered a contract for Tasmania for the 2017–18 season. He made his List A debut for Tasmania in the 2017–18 JLT One-Day Cup on 7 October 2017. In March 2018, Cricket Australia named Rogers in their Sheffield Shield team of the year.

He made his Twenty20 debut for Hobart Hurricanes in the 2017–18 Big Bash League season on 30 December 2017. He switched to the Sydney Sixers in 2020–21 but did not play a match for the team and moved back to Hobart for the 2021–22 season before moving to play for Melbourne Renegades in 2022–23.

Rogers played six matches for Kent County Cricket Club in the T20 Blast during 2024 and re-signed to play for the club in the group stages of the 2025 competition.
