= James Bazley =

Australian cricketer

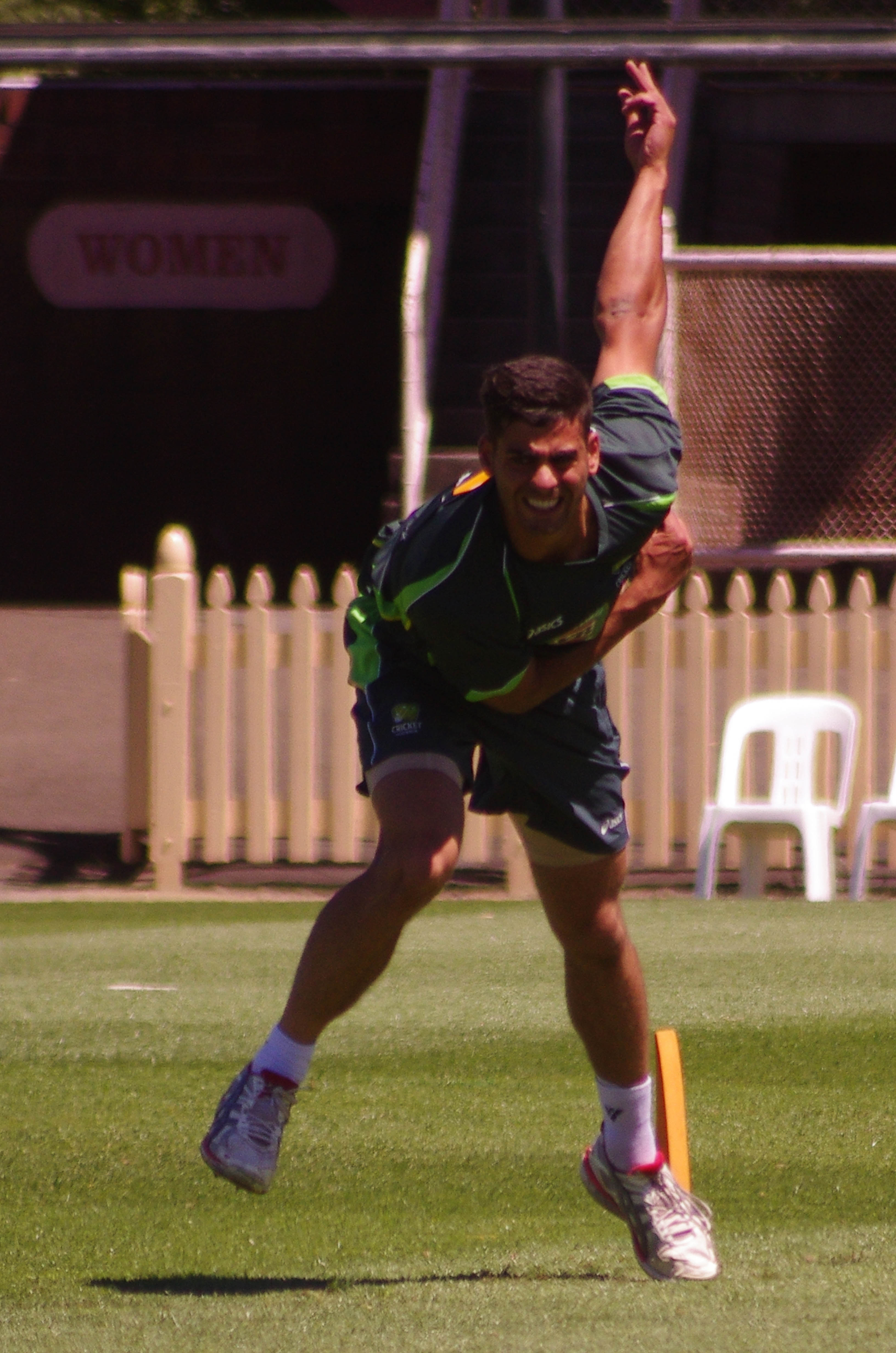
- Bazley in 2014

Personal information
- Full name: James Jordan Bazley
- Born: 8 April 1995 (age 31); Buderim, Queensland, Australia
- Batting: Right-handed
- Bowling: Right arm fast-medium
- Role: All-rounder

Domestic team information
- Years: Team
- 2014/15–2016/17: Cricket Australia XI (squad no. 7)
- 2020/21–2023/24: Queensland
- 2020/21–2022/23: Brisbane Heat (squad no. 7)
- 2023: Kent (squad no. 77)
- 2023/24–: Adelaide Strikers (squad no. 7)

Career statistics
Competition	FC	LA	T20
Matches	14	30	48
Runs scored	290	275	442
Batting average	22.30	11.95	14.25
100s/50s	0/3	0/0	0/0
Top score	64*	45	49*
Balls bowled	1,599	994	697
Wickets	23	23	33
Bowling average	35.95	42.91	31.03
5 wickets in innings	0	0	0
10 wickets in match	0	0	0
Best bowling	2/9	3/12	4/22
Catches/stumpings	9/–	7/–	11/–
- Source: Cricinfo, 1 November 2025

James Jordan Bazley (born 8 April 1995) is an Australian cricketer. He has been described as an all-rounder who is a medium-fast bowler and power-hitting lower order batsman.

Bazley began his cricket career playing for the Sunshine Coast Cricket Club in Queensland Premier Cricket. He was selected to represent Australia at the 2014 Under 19 World Cup and was described as having an important impact in the tournament with bat and ball. He received a rookie contract with the Brisbane Heat the same year. He did not play for the Brisbane Heat in the 2014–15 season but was selected to represent a Cricket Australia XI in a T20 tour game against South Africa.

In 2015 Bazley was selected in the squad of the newly established Cricket Australia XI which competed in the 2015–16 Matador BBQs One-Day Cup, and he made his List A debut for the team on 5 October 2015. In November he was named as twelfth man in the Cricket Australia XI for a tour game against the visiting West Indies Test team, and he ultimately played in the match making his first-class debut and taking four wickets across two innings bowling and scoring a 50 in the only innings he batted in.

In 2015 Bazley received a rookie contract with the Queensland state team and was still playing for Sunshine Coast in grade cricket, and as of 2017 he had received a full state contract with Queensland but had moved to East Redlands in grade cricket. In 2016 he received a contract from the Hobart Hurricanes, and he suffered a career-threatening groin injury whilst training with the side in 2017 being sidelined for the entirety of the 2017/18 season and the vast majority of the 2018/19 season.

In the 2019/20 season Bazley returned to cricket by playing for the East Redlands side in Queensland Premier Cricket and the Queensland 2nd XI, and he was contracted by the Brisbane Heat for the 2020/21 Big Bash League. In 2021 he returned to the Queensland state team receiving a full contract, and he was re-signed by the Heat for the 2022/23 Big Bash League.

On 9 August 2023, Bazley signed with Adelaide Strikers on a multi-year deal starting in 2023–24.
