= 2017–18 Big Bash League season squads =

The 2017–18 Big Bash League season was the seventh season of the Big Bash League, the premier Twenty20 cricket competition in Australia. Each team could sign a minimum of 18 players, including two rookies and two visa contracted players.

Ages are given as of the date of the first match played in the tournament.

== Adelaide Strikers ==
No.	Name	National side	Date of birth (age)	Batting style	Bowling style	Notes
Batsmen
34	Travis Head	Australia	29 December 1993 (aged 23)	Left-handed	Right arm off spin	Captain
77	Jono Dean	Australia	23 June 1984 (aged 33)	Right-handed	Right arm off spin	
88	Daniel Drew	Australia	22 May 1996 (aged 21)	Right-handed	Right arm off spin	
41	Colin Ingram	South Africa	3 July 1985 (aged 32)	Left-handed	Right arm leg spin	
33	Jake Lehmann	Australia	8 July 1992 (aged 25)	Left-handed	Left arm orthodox	
28	Jake Weatherald	Australia	4 November 1994 (aged 23)	Left-handed	Right arm leg spin	
29	Jonathan Wells	Australia	13 August 1988 (aged 29)	Right-handed	Right arm medium	
All-rounders
20	Michael Neser	Australia	29 March 1990 (aged 27)	Right-handed	Right arm medium fast	
Wicketkeepers
5	Alex Carey	Australia	27 August 1991 (aged 26)	Left-handed	Right arm medium fast	
Bowlers
56	Ben Laughlin	Australia	3 October 1982 (aged 35)	Right-handed	Right arm fast medium	
3	Billy Stanlake	Australia	11 April 1994 (aged 23)	Right-handed	Right arm fast	
21	Wes Agar	Australia	5 February 1997 (aged 20)	Right-handed	Right arm fast	
17	Michael Cormack	Australia	29 June 1997 (aged 20)	Right-handed	Right arm off spin	
14	David Grant	Australia	24 May 1997 (aged 20)	Right-handed	Right arm medium fast	
19	Rashid Khan	Afghanistan	20 September 1998 (aged 19)	Right-handed	Right arm leg spin	
9	Liam O'Connor	Australia	20 June 1993 (aged 24)	Right-handed	Right arm leg spin	
91	Peter Siddle	Australia	22 January 1984 (aged 33)	Right-handed	Right arm fast medium	
44	Nick Winter	Australia	19 June 1993 (aged 24)	Left-handed	Left arm medium fast	

== Brisbane Heat ==
No.	Name	National side	Date of birth (age)	Batting style	Bowling style	Notes
Batsmen
62	Joe Burns	Australia	6 September 1989 (aged 28)	Right-handed	Right arm medium	
1	Max Bryant	Australia	–	Right-handed	Right arm medium	
5	Sam Heazlett	Australia	12 September 1995 (aged 22)	Left-handed	Left arm orthodox	
9	Marnus Labuschagne	Australia	22 June 1994 (aged 23)	Right-handed	Right arm leg spin	
50	Chris Lynn	Australia	10 April 1990 (aged 27)	Right-handed	Left arm leg spin	
42	Brendon McCullum	New Zealand	27 September 1981 (aged 36)	Right-handed	Right arm medium	Captain
77	Matthew Renshaw	Australia	28 March 1996 (aged 21)	Left-handed	Right arm off spin	
49	Alex Ross	Australia	17 April 1992 (aged 25)	Right-handed	Right arm off spin	
All-rounders
52	Jason Floros	Australia	24 December 1990 (aged 26)	Left-handed	Right arm off spin	
Wicketkeepers
59	Jimmy Peirson	Australia	13 October 1992 (aged 25)	Right-handed	-	
Bowlers
31	Ben Cutting	Australia	30 January 1987 (aged 30)	Right-handed	Right arm fast medium	
35	Brendan Doggett	Australia	3 May 1994 (aged 23)	Right-handed	Right arm medium fast	
7	Shadab Khan	Pakistan	23 January 1998 (aged 19)	Right-handed	Right arm leg spin	
2	Josh Lalor	Australia	2 November 1987 (aged 30)	Right-handed	Left arm fast medium	
86	Yasir Shah	Pakistan	2 May 1986 (aged 31)	Right-handed	Right arm leg spin	
4	Mitch Swepson	Australia	4 October 1993 (aged 24)	Right-handed	Right arm leg spin	
6	Mark Steketee	Australia	2 January 1994 (aged 23)	Right-handed	Right arm fast	
3	Cameron Valente	Australia	6 September 1994 (aged 23)	Right-handed	Right arm fast	

== Hobart Hurricanes ==
No.	Name	National side	Date of birth (age)	Batting style	Bowling style	Notes
Batsmen
10	George Bailey	Australia	7 September 1982 (aged 35)	Right-handed	Right arm medium	Captain & International Cap
14	Alex Doolan	Australia	29 November 1985 (aged 32)	Right-handed		International Cap
-	Nathan Reardon	Australia	11 September 1984 (aged 33)	Left-handed	Right-Arm medium	International Cap
All-rounders
23	D'Arcy Short	Australia	9 August 1990 (aged 27)	Left-handed	Left arm orthodox spin	
77	James Bazley	Australia	8 April 1995 (aged 22)	Right-handed	Right arm medium	
54	Daniel Christian	Australia	4 May 1983 (aged 34)	Right-handed	Right arm medium-fast	International Cap
29	Hamish Kingston	Australia	17 December 1990 (aged 27)	Right-handed	Right arm medium-fast	
15	Simon Milenko	Australia	24 November 1988 (aged 29)	Right-handed	Right arm fast-medium	
Wicketkeepers
28	Ben McDermott	Australia	12 December 1994 (aged 23)	Right-handed	Right arm medium	
27	Tim Paine	Australia	8 December 1984 (aged 33)	Right-handed	Right arm medium	International Cap
13	Matthew Wade	Australia	26 December 1987 (aged 29)	Left-handed	Right arm medium	International Cap
Pace bowlers
43	Sam Rainbird	Australia	5 June 1992 (aged 25)	Right-handed	Left arm fast-medium	
44	Jake Reed	Australia	28 September 1990 (aged 27)	Right-handed	Right arm fast-medium	
-	Tom Rogers	Australia	3 March 1994 (aged 23)	Right-handed	Right arm fast-medium	
-	Jofra Archer	England	5 January 1995 (aged 22)	Right-handed	Right arm fast-medium	Overseas Player
72	Tymal Mills	England	12 August 1992 (aged 25)	Right-handed	Left arm fast	Overseas Player
-	David Moody	Australia	28 April 1995 (aged 22)	Right-handed	Right arm fast-medium	
Spin bowlers
13	Cameron Boyce	Australia	27 July 1989 (aged 28)	Right-handed	Right arm leg spin	International Cap
31	Clive Rose	Australia	13 October 1989 (aged 28)	Right-handed	Left arm orthodox	

== Melbourne Renegades ==
No.	Name	National side	Date of birth (age)	Batting style	Bowling style	Notes
Batsmen
5	Aaron Finch	Australia	17 November 1987 (aged 30)	Right-handed	Left arm orthodox	Captain
26	Tom Cooper	Australia	26 November 1986 (aged 31)	Right-handed	Right arm off spin	
21	Marcus Harris	Australia	21 July 1992 (aged 25)	Left-handed	Right arm off spin	
17	Brad Hodge	Australia	29 December 1974 (aged 42)	Right-handed	Right arm off spin	
9	Matt Short	Australia	8 November 1995 (aged 22)	Right-handed	Right arm off spin	
20	Beau Webster	Australia	1 December 1993 (aged 24)	Right-handed	Right arm off spin	
7	Cameron White	Australia	18 August 1983 (aged 34)	Right-handed	Right arm leg spin	
All-rounders
47	Dwayne Bravo	West Indies	7 October 1983 (aged 34)	Right-handed	Right arm medium fast	
31	Brad Hogg	Australia	6 February 1971 (aged 46)	Left-handed	Slow left-arm wrist-spin	
24	Jack Wildermuth	Australia	1 September 1993 (aged 24)	Right-handed	Right arm medium fast	
Wicketkeepers
15	Tim Ludeman	Australia	23 June 1987 (aged 30)	Right-handed	-	
Bowlers
25	Jon Holland	Australia	29 May 1987 (aged 30)	Right-handed	Left arm orthodox	
15	Joe Mennie	Australia	24 December 1988 (aged 28)	Right-handed	Right arm fast medium	
74	Sunil Narine	West Indies	26 May 1988 (aged 29)	Left-handed	Right arm off spin	
19	James Pattinson	Australia	3 May 1990 (aged 27)	Left-handed	Right arm fast medium	
23	Kane Richardson	Australia	12 February 1991 (aged 26)	Right-handed	Right arm fast medium	
14	Chris Tremain	Australia	10 August 1991 (aged 26)	Right-handed	Right arm fast	
4	Guy Walker	Australia	12 September 1995 (aged 22)	Right-handed	Right arm fast	

== Melbourne Stars ==
No.	Name	National side	Date of birth (age)	Batting style	Bowling style	Notes
Batsmen
24	Kevin Pietersen	England	27 June 1980 (aged 37)	Right-handed	Right arm off spin	
12	Rob Quiney	Australia	20 August 1982 (aged 35)	Left-handed	Right arm medium	
All-rounders
11	John Hastings	Australia	4 November 1985 (aged 32)	Right-handed	Right arm fast medium	Captain
5	James Faulkner	Australia	29 April 1990 (aged 27)	Right-handed	Left arm medium fast	
4	Evan Gulbis	Australia	26 March 1986 (aged 31)	Right-handed	Right arm medium	
32	Glenn Maxwell	Australia	14 October 1988 (aged 29)	Right-handed	Right arm off spin	
16	Marcus Stoinis	Australia	16 August 1989 (aged 28)	Right-handed	Right arm medium	
6	Luke Wright	England	7 March 1985 (aged 32)	Right-handed	Right arm medium fast	
Wicketkeepers
51	Ben Dunk	Australia	11 March 1987 (aged 30)	Left-handed	Right arm off spin	
13	Seb Gotch	Australia	12 July 1993 (aged 24)	Left-handed	Right arm medium	
54	Peter Handscomb	Australia	26 April 1991 (aged 26)	Right-handed	Right arm off spin	
3	Sam Harper	Australia	10 December 1996 (aged 21)	Right-handed	-	
Bowlers
19	Michael Beer	Australia	9 June 1984 (aged 33)	Right-handed	Left arm orthodox	
25	Scott Boland	Australia	11 April 1989 (aged 28)	Right-handed	Right arm medium fast	
9	Jackson Coleman	Australia	18 December 1991 (aged 26)	Right-handed	Left arm medium fast	
20	Ben Hilfenhaus	Australia	15 March 1983 (aged 34)	Right-handed	Right arm fast medium	
17	Daniel Worrall	Australia	10 July 1991 (aged 26)	Right-handed	Right arm fast medium	
63	Adam Zampa	Australia	31 March 1992 (aged 25)	Right-handed	Right arm leg spin	
