= 2019–20 Melbourne Stars season =

Melbourne Stars
2019-20 season
- Coach: (Australia) David Hussey
- Captain(s): (Australia) Glenn Maxwell
- Home ground: Melbourne Cricket Ground, Melbourne
- BBL Season: 1st
- BBL Playoffs: Runners Up
- Leading Run Scorer: (Australia) Marcus Stoinis (705)
- Leading Wicket Taker: (Pakistan) Haris Rauf (20) (Australia) Adam Zampa (20)
- Highest home attendance: 54,478 vs Renegades (4 January 2020)
- Lowest home attendance: 6,180 vs Hurricanes (22 December 2019)
- Average home attendance: 21,446

The 2019–20 Melbourne Stars season is the ninth in the club's history. Coached by David Hussey and captained by Glenn Maxwell, they competed in the BBL's 2019–20 season.

== Season ==
=== Ladder ===
Pos	Team	Pld	W	L	NR	Pts	NRR	Qualification
1	Melbourne Stars	14	10	4	0	20	0.526	Advanced to play-off phase
2	Sydney Sixers (C)	14	9	4	1	19	0.269	Advanced to play-off phase
3	Adelaide Strikers	14	8	5	1	17	0.564	Advanced to play-off phase
4	Hobart Hurricanes	14	6	7	1	13	−0.355	Advanced to play-off phase
5	Sydney Thunder	14	6	7	1	13	−0.446	Advanced to play-off phase
6	Perth Scorchers	14	6	8	0	12	−0.023	
7	Brisbane Heat	14	6	8	0	12	−0.237	
8	Melbourne Renegades	14	3	11	0	6	−0.348	

(C) Champions

=== Regular season ===
20 December 2019
19:10 (D/N)
Scorecard

Melbourne Stars; 7/167 (20 overs)	v	Brisbane Heat (H); 8/145 (20 overs)
Glenn Maxwell 83 (39); Matt Renshaw 1/2 (1 over)		Tom Banton 64 (36); Adam Zampa 3/30 (4 overs)

Melbourne Stars won by 22 runs
Metricon Stadium, Gold Coast
Attendance: 11,969
Umpires: Simon Lightbody and John Ward
Player of the match: Glenn Maxwell (Melbourne Stars)

- Brisbane Heat won the toss and elected to field.

22 December 2019
14:45
Scorecard

(H) Melbourne Stars; 4/163 (20 overs)	v	Hobart Hurricanes; 111 (16 overs)
Marcus Stoinis 81* (54); Riley Meredith 3/27 (4 overs)		Clive Rose 32* (18); Haris Rauf 5/27 (4 overs)

Melbourne Stars won by 52 runs
Ted Summerton Reserve, Moe
Attendance: 6,180
Umpires: Greg Davidson and Donovan Koch
Player of the match: Haris Rauf (Melbourne Stars)

- Melbourne Stars won the toss and elected to bat.

27 December 2019
19:10 (D/N)
Scorecard

Adelaide Strikers; 4/174 (20 overs)	v	Melbourne Stars (H); 6/169 (20 overs)
Jonathan Wells 68* (46); Sandeep Lamichhane 1/15 (3 overs)		Glenn Maxwell 43 (25); Peter Siddle 3/24 (4 overs)

Adelaide Strikers won by 5 runs
Metricon Stadium, Gold Coast
Attendance: 7,421
Umpires: Shawn Craig and Sam Nogajski
Player of the match: Jonathan Wells (Adelaide Strikers)

- Melbourne Stars won the toss and elected to field.

30 December 2019
19:10 (D/N)
Scorecard

(H) Hobart Hurricanes; 5/69 (11 overs)	v	Melbourne Stars; 3/55 (7.3 overs)
Caleb Jewell 26 (28); Dale Steyn 2/12 (2 overs)		Marcus Stoinis 25 (19); James Faulkner 2/10 (2 overs)

Melbourne Stars won by 4 runs (DLS method)
University of Tasmania Stadium, Launceston
Attendance: 8,753
Umpires: Phillip Gillespie and Tony Wilds
Player of the match: Nathan Coulter-Nile (Melbourne Stars)

- Melbourne Stars won the toss and elected to field.
- The match was reduced to 11 overs per side due to rain. No further play was possible due to rain.

2 January 2020
15:40
Scorecard

(H) Sydney Thunder; 7/142 (20 overs)	v	Melbourne Stars; 7/143 (19.4 overs)
Alex Ross 40 (32); Haris Rauf 3/24 (4 overs)		Nick Larkin 65 (45); Daniel Sams 3/25 (4 overs)

Melbourne Stars won by 3 wickets
Sydney Showground Stadium, Sydney
Attendance: 14,435
Umpires: Michael Graham-Smith and Nathan Johnstone
Player of the match: Nick Larkin (Melbourne Stars)

- Sydney Thunder won the toss and elected to bat.

4 January 2020
19:10 (D/N)
Scorecard

Melbourne Renegades; 9/142 (20 overs)	v	Melbourne Stars (H); 2/143 (18.5 overs)
Shaun Marsh 43 (33); Sandeep Lamichhane 3/26 (4 overs)		Marcus Stoinis 68* (55); Kane Richardson 1/34 (4 overs)

Melbourne Stars won by 8 wickets
Melbourne Cricket Ground, Melbourne
Attendance: 54,478
Umpires: Gerard Abood and Phillip Gillespie
Player of the match: Adam Zampa (Melbourne Stars)

- Melbourne Stars won the toss and elected to field.

8 January 2020
19:10 (D/N)
Scorecard

Sydney Thunder; 5/145 (20 overs)	v	Melbourne Stars (H); 4/148 (17.5 overs)
Matthew Gilkes 41 (35); Haris Rauf 3/23 (4 overs)		Glenn Maxwell 59* (37); Arjun Nair 2/15 (2 overs)

Melbourne Stars won by 6 wickets
Melbourne Cricket Ground, Melbourne
Attendance: 21,322
Umpires: Geoff Joshua and Donovan Koch
Player of the match: Haris Rauf (Melbourne Stars)

- Melbourne Stars won the toss and elected to field.
- Haris Rauf (Melbourne Stars) took the sixth hat-trick in the BBL.

10 January 2020
19:10 (D/N)
Scorecard

Melbourne Renegades (H); 7/168 (20 overs)	v	Melbourne Stars; 3/169 (18.4)
Shaun Marsh 63 (43); Nathan Coulter-Nile 2/29 (4 overs)		Glenn Maxwell 83* (45); Samit Patel 1/21 (4 overs)

Melbourne Stars won by 7 wickets
Marvel Stadium, Melbourne
Attendance: 30,388
Umpires: Simon Fry and Michael Graham-Smith
Player of the match: Glenn Maxwell (Melbourne Stars)

- Melbourne Stars won the toss and elected to field
- Lance Morris (Melbourne Stars) made his T20 debut.

12 January 2020
19:10 (D/N)
Scorecard

(H) Melbourne Stars; 1/219 (20 overs)	v	Sydney Sixers; 7/175 (20 overs)
Marcus Stoinis 147* (79); Tom Curran 1/58 (4 overs)		Ben Dwarshuis 42* (17); Clint Hinchliffe 3/20 (4 overs)

Melbourne Stars won by 44 runs
Melbourne Cricket Ground, Melbourne
Attendance: 21,556
Umpires: Phillip Gillespie and Donovan Koch
Player of the match: Marcus Stoinis (Melbourne Stars)

- Sydney Sixers won the toss and elected to field.
- Marcus Stoinis (Melbourne Stars) scored the highest individual score in a BBL match.

15 January 2020
18:10 (D/N)
Scorecard

Perth Scorchers (H); 86 (13.5 overs)	v	Melbourne Stars; 2/89 (12 overs)
Josh Inglis 37 (19); Jackson Coleman 3/16 (3 overs)		Marcus Stoinis 39* (31); Mitchell Marsh 1/15 (2 overs)

Melbourne Stars won by 8 wickets
Optus Stadium, Perth
Attendance: 25,074
Umpires: Gerard Abood and Nathan Johnstone
Player of the match: Jackson Coleman (Melbourne Stars)

- Perth Scorchers won the toss and elected to bat.
- Jaron Morgan (Perth Scorchers) made his T20 debut.

18 January 2020
15:40
Scorecard

Melbourne Stars (H); 6/141 (20 overs)	v	Perth Scorchers; 9/131 (20 overs)
Hilton Cartwright 58 (56); Matthew Kelly 3/27 (4 overs)		Cameron Bancroft 32 (44); Nic Maddinson 3/24 (4 overs)

Melbourne Stars won by 10 runs
Melbourne Cricket Ground, Melbourne
Attendance: 28,042
Umpires: Darren Close and Paul Wilson
Player of the match: Glenn Maxwell (Melbourne Stars)

- Melbourne Stars won the toss and elected to bat

20 January 2020
18:40 (D/N)
Scorecard

Sydney Sixers (H); 4/143 (14 overs)	v	Melbourne Stars; 5/125 (14 overs)
Moises Henriques 72 (31); Sandeep Lamichhane 2/38 (3 overs)		Marcus Stoinis 62 (37); Ben Dwarshuis 2/20 (3 overs)

Sydney Sixers won by 21 runs (DLS method)
Sydney Cricket Ground, Sydney
Umpires: Gerard Abood and Paul Wilson
Player of the match: Moises Henriques (Sydney Sixers)

- Melbourne Stars won the toss and elected to field.
- The match was reduced to 14 overs per side due to rain.

22 January 2020
19:10 (D/N)
Scorecard

Adelaide Strikers (H); 4/162 (20 overs)	v	Melbourne Stars; 8/151 (20 overs)
Jonathan Wells 55* (36); Clint Hinchliffe 3/19 (3 overs)		Peter Handscomb 65* (39); Peter Siddle 4/33 (4 overs)

Adelaide Strikers won by 11 runs
Adelaide Oval, Adelaide
Attendance: 23,014
Umpires: Greg Davidson and Donovan Koch
Player of the match: Jonathan Wells (Adelaide Strikers)

- Melbourne Stars won the toss and elected to field.

25 January 2020
19:10 (D/N)
Scorecard

Brisbane Heat; 5/186 (20 overs)	v	Melbourne Stars (H); 115 (17.4 overs)
AB de Villiers 71 (37); Adam Zampa 3/27 (4 overs)		Peter Handscomb 27 (18); Mitchell Swepson 3/31 (4 overs)

Brisbane Heat won by 71 runs
Melbourne Cricket Ground, Melbourne
Attendance: 27,676
Player of the match: AB de Villiers (Brisbane Heat)

- Brisbane Heat won the toss and elected to bat.
- Dilbar Hussain (Melbourne Stars) made his T20 debut.

=== Playoffs ===
==== Qualifier ====
31 January 2020
19:15 (D/N)
Scorecard

Sydney Sixers; 7/142 (20 overs)	v	Melbourne Stars (H); 99 (18 overs)
Josh Philippe 34 (28); Adam Zampa 3/21 (4 overs)		Clint Hinchliffe 25* (25); Sean Abbott 3/23 (4 overs)

Sydney Sixers won by 43 runs
Melbourne Cricket Ground, Melbourne
Attendance: 13,275
Umpires: Gerard Abood and Phillip Gillespie
Player of the match: Steve O'Keefe (Sydney Sixers)

- Melbourne Stars won the toss and elected to field.

==== The Challenger ====
6 February 2020
19:40 (D/N)
Scorecard

(H) Melbourne Stars; 2/194 (20 overs)	v	Sydney Thunder; 8/166 (20 overs)
Nick Larkin 83* (49); Chris Morris 2/30 (4 overs)		Alex Ross 58 (38); Haris Rauf 3/17 (4 overs)

Melbourne Stars won by 28 runs
Melbourne Cricket Ground, Melbourne
Attendance: 13,067
Umpires: Gerard Abood and Shawn Craig
Player of the match: Nick Larkin (Melbourne Stars)

- Melbourne Stars won the toss and elected to bat.

==== The Final ====
8 February 2020
19:15 (D/N)
Scorecard

(H) Sydney Sixers; 5/116 (12 overs)	v	Melbourne Stars; 6/97 (12 overs)
Josh Philippe 52 (29); Glenn Maxwell 2/17 (2 overs)		Nick Larkin 38* (26); Nathan Lyon 2/19 (2 overs)

Sydney Sixers won by 19 runs
Sydney Cricket Ground, Sydney
Attendance: 10,121
Umpires: Gerard Abood and Paul Wilson
Player of the match: Josh Philippe (Sydney Sixers)

- Melbourne Stars won the toss and elected to field.
- The match was reduced to 12 overs per side due to rain.

== Players ==
=== Squad ===
The following is the Stars men's squad for the 2019–20 Big Bash League season as of 27 January 2020.

S/N	Name	Nat.	Date of birth (age)	Batting style	Bowling style	Notes
Batsmen
36	Nick Larkin	(Australia) (Republic of Ireland)	1 May 1990 (age 35)	Right-handed	-	
53	Nic Maddinson	(Australia)	21 December 1991 (age 34)	Left-handed	Left-arm orthodox	International Cap
All-rounders
12	Jonathan Merlo	(Australia)	15 December 1998 (age 27)	Right-handed	Right-arm medium-fast	
16	Marcus Stoinis	(Australia)	16 August 1989 (age 36)	Right-handed	Right-arm medium	International Cap
23	Clint Hinchliffe	(Australia)	23 October 1996 (age 29)	Left-handed	Left-arm orthodox	
32	Glenn Maxwell	(Australia)	14 October 1988 (age 37)	Right-handed	Right-arm off-spin	Captain, International Cap
35	Hilton Cartwright	(Australia)	14 February 1992 (age 34)	Right-handed	Right-arm medium	International Cap
Wicketkeepers
13	Seb Gotch	(Australia)	12 July 1993 (age 32)	Right-handed	Right-arm off-break	
51	Ben Dunk	(Australia)	11 March 1987 (age 39)	Left-handed	Right arm off-break	International Cap
54	Peter Handscomb	(Australia)	26 April 1991 (age 34)	Right-handed	Right-arm medium fast	Vice-Captain, International Cap
Pace bowlers
7	Nathan Coulter-Nile	(Australia)	11 October 1987 (age 38)	Right-handed	Right-arm fast	International Cap
8	Dale Steyn	(South Africa)	26 August 1983 (age 36)	Right-handed	Right-arm fast	Visa Contract and International Cap
9	Jackson Coleman	(Australia)	18 December 1991 (age 34)	Right-handed	Right-arm fast-medium	U-19 International Cap
17	Daniel Worrall	(Australia)	10 July 1991 (age 34)	Right-handed	Right-arm fast-medium	
28	Lance Morris	(Australia)	28 March 1998 (age 27)	Right-handed	Right-arm fast	
40	Pat Brown	(England)	23 August 1998 (age 27)	Right-handed	Right-arm fast-medium	Visa Contract and International Cap
72	Dilbar Hussain	(Pakistan)	20 February 1993 (age 33)	Right-handed	Right-arm fast	Visa Contract
77	Haris Rauf	(Pakistan)	7 November 1993 (age 32)	Right-handed	Right-arm fast	Visa Contract and International Cap
Spin bowlers
6	Tom O'Connell	(Australia)	14 June 2000 (age 25)	Right-handed	Left-arm orthodox	
25	Sandeep Lamichhane	(Nepal)	2 August 2000 (age 25)	Right-handed	Right-arm leg-break	Visa Contract and International Cap
88	Adam Zampa	(Australia)	31 March 1992 (age 33)	Right-handed	Right-arm leg-break	International Cap

- Player ruled out of season due to injury.

=== Personnel Changes ===
==== Incoming Players ====
Entry date	Role	No.	Player	From team	Notes	Ref.
14 April 2019	All-rounder	35	(Australia) Hilton Cartwright	(Australia) Perth Scorchers	International Cap	
14 August 2019	Pace Bowler	7	(Australia) Nathan Coulter-Nile	(Australia) Perth Scorchers	International Cap	
14 August 2019	All-rounder	23	(Australia) Clint Hinchliffe	(Australia) Perth Scorchers		
14 August 2019	Pace Bowler	28	(Australia) Lance Morris	(Australia) Perth Scorchers		
8 October 2019	Pace Bowler	8	(South Africa) Dale Steyn	(South Africa) International Player	Visa Contract and International Cap	
6 November 2019	Pace Bowler	40	(England) Pat Brown	(England) International Player	Visa Contract and International Cap	
19 December 2019	Pace Bowler	77	(Pakistan) Haris Rauf	(Pakistan) International Player	Visa Contract, Injury Replacement for Dale Steyn	
24 January 2020	Pace Bowler	72	(Pakistan) Dilbar Hussain	(Pakistan) International Player	Visa Contract, International Replacement for Haris Rauf	

==== Outgoing Players ====
Exit date	Role	No.	Player	To team	Notes	Ref.
8 February 2019	Spin Bowler	19	(Australia) Michael Beer	Retired	International Cap	
1 March 2019	All-rounder	4	(Australia) Evan Gulbis	Released		
1 March 2019	Batsman	28	(Australia) Travis Dean	Released		
1 March 2019	Pace Bowler	33	(England) Liam Plunkett	Released	Visa Contract and International Cap	
3 May 2019	All-rounder	47	(Trinidad and Tobago) Dwayne Bravo	Released	Visa Contract and International Cap	
31 August 2019	Pace Bowler	22	(Australia) Jackson Bird	(Australia) Sydney Sixers	International Cap	
23 October 2019	Pace Bowler	25	(Australia) Scott Boland	(Australia) Hobart Hurricanes	International Cap	
5 January 2020	Spin Bowler	23	(Australia) Liam Bowe	(Australia) Sydney Thunder		

== Season statistics ==
=== Attendance ===
==== Home attendance ====
Match	Opponent	Attendance
2	Hobart Hurricanes	6,180
3	Adelaide Strikers	7,421
6	Melbourne Renegades	54,478
7	Sydney Thunder	21,322
9	Sydney Sixers	21,556
10	Perth Scorchers	28,042
14	Brisbane Heat	27,676
QF	Sydney Sixers	13,275
CH	Sydney Thunder	13,067
Total Attendance		193,017
Average Attendance		21,446

=== Batting ===
==== Most runs ====
Batsman	Matches	Innings	Runs	BF	Average	SR
(Australia) Marcus Stoinis	17	17	705	516	54.23	136.62
(Australia) Glenn Maxwell	17	16	398	268	39.80	148.50
(Australia) Nick Larkin	14	11	297	217	37.12	136.86
(Australia) Hilton Cartwright	9	8	230	182	38.33	126.37
(Australia) Peter Handscomb	12	10	188	146	31.33	128.76

Full Table on Cricinfo

Last updated: 8 February 2020

==== Highest scores ====
Batsman	Score	Opp
(Australia) Marcus Stoinis	147*	Sixers
(Australia) Glenn Maxwell	83*	Renegades
(Australia) Nick Larkin	83*	Thunder
(Australia) Glenn Maxwell	83	Heat
(Australia) Marcus Stoinis	83	Thunder

Full Table on Cricinfo

Last updated: 6 February 2020

==== Best strike rates ====
Batsman	Mat	SR
(Australia) Jonathan Merlo	1	200.00
(Australia) Nathan Coulter-Nile	12	150.00
(Australia) Glenn Maxwell	17	148.50
(Australia) Nick Larkin	14	136.86
(Australia) Marcus Stoinis	17	136.62

Full Table on Cricinfo

Last updated: 8 February 2020

==== Most sixes ====
Batsman	6's
(Australia) Marcus Stoinis	28
(Australia) Glenn Maxwell	20
(Australia) Nick Larkin	8
(Australia) Hilton Cartwright	6
(Australia) Peter Handscomb	5

Full Table on Cricinfo

Last updated: 8 February 2020

=== Bowling ===
==== Most wickets ====
Bowler	Matches	Wkts	Balls	RC	BBI	Econ
(Pakistan) Haris Rauf	10	20	237	267	5/27	7.05
(Australia) Adam Zampa	12	20	270	324	3/21	7.20
(Nepal) Sandeep Lamichhane	13	15	270	335	3/26	7.44
(Australia) Glenn Maxwell	17	10	222	260	3/19	7.02
(Australia) Nathan Coulter-Nile	12	10	228	286	2/14	7.52

Full Table on Cricinfo

Last updated: 8 February 2020

==== Best bowling figures in an innings ====
Bowler	Ovr	BBI	Opp
(Pakistan) Haris Rauf	4.0	5/27	Hurricanes
(Australia) Jackson Coleman	3.0	3/16	Scorchers
(Pakistan) Haris Rauf	4.0	3/17	Thunder
(Australia) Clint Hinchliffe	3.0	3/19	Strikers
(Australia) Clint Hinchliffe	4.0	3/20	Sixers

Full Table on Cricinfo

Last updated: 86 February 2020

==== Best economy rates ====
Batsman	Mat	Econ
(Australia) Jackson Coleman	1	5.33
(South Africa) Dale Steyn	4	6.23
(Australia) Nic Maddinson	14	6.50
(Australia) Glenn Maxwell	17	7.02
(Pakistan) Haris Rauf	10	7.05

Full Table on Cricinfo

Last updated: 8 February 2020

==== Hat-tricks ====
Hat-trick No.	Player	Opp	Dismissals
1	(Pakistan) Haris Rauf	Sydney Thunder	Matthew Gilkes (c); Callum Ferguson (b); Daniel Sams (lbw)
