= 2018–19 JLT One-Day Cup =

Cricket tournament

2018 JLT One-Day Cup
- Dates: 16 September 2018 – 10 October 2018
- Administrator: Cricket Australia
- Cricket format: List A
- Tournament format: Round-robin tournament
- Host(s): Townsville, Sydney, Perth, Melbourne
- Champions: Victoria (6th title)
- Participants: 6
- Matches: 20
- Player of the series: Ben McDermott (TAS)
- Most runs: Chris Lynn (QLD) (452 runs)
- Most wickets: Andrew Tye (WA); Gurinder Sandhu (TAS) (18 wickets each)

The 2018 JLT One-Day Cup was the 50th season of the official List A domestic cricket competition in Australia. It was played over a four-week period at the start of the domestic season to separate its schedule from the Sheffield Shield season. The tournament was held in Townsville, Sydney, Perth and Melbourne. Fox Cricket broadcast 13 matches from the tournament. The tournament was sponsored by Jardine Lloyd Thompson.

== Points table ==
Pos	Team	Pld	W	L	T	NR	BP	Pts	NRR
1	Western Australia	5	5	0	0	0	3	23	1.945
2	Tasmania	5	3	2	0	0	1	13	−0.257
3	South Australia	5	2	3	0	0	1	9	−0.174
4	Victoria	5	2	3	0	0	1	9	−0.464
5	New South Wales	5	2	3	0	0	1	9	−0.484
6	Queensland	5	1	4	0	0	1	5	−0.322

RESULT POINTS:

- Win – 4
- Tie – 2 each
- No Result – 2 each
- Loss – 0
- Bonus Point – 1 (Run rate 1.25 times that of opposition.)
- Additional Bonus Point – 1 (Run rate twice that of opposition.)

== Squads ==
The following squads were named:

New South Wales	Queensland	South Australia	Tasmania	Victoria	Western Australia
Kurtis Patterson (c); Sean Abbott; Harry Conway; Trent Copeland; Pat Cummins; Ben Dwarshuis; Jack Edwards; Mickey Edwards; Ryan Gibson; Chris Green; Moises Henriques; Daniel Hughes; Nick Larkin; Jay Lenton; Peter Nevill; Steve O'Keefe; Daniel Sams; Jason Sangha	Jimmy Peirson (c); Chris Lynn (c); Xavier Bartlett; Max Bryant; Joe Burns; Luke Feldman; Sam Heazlett; Charlie Hemphrey; Lachlan Pfeffer; Jack Prestwidge; Billy Stanlake; Mark Steketee; Mitchell Swepson; Sam Truloff; Jack Wildermuth	Jake Lehmann (c); Alex Carey; Tom Cooper; Callum Ferguson; Spencer Johnson; Joe Mennie; Harry Nielsen; Kane Richardson; Luke Robins; Alex Ross; Chadd Sayers; Cameron Valente; Jake Weatherald; Daniel Worrall; Adam Zampa	George Bailey (c); Jackson Bird; Nicholas Buchanan; Jake Doran; ~~James Faulkner~~; Ben McDermott; Riley Meredith; Simon Milenko; Tom Rogers; Clive Rose; Gurinder Sandhu; Jordan Silk; Aaron Summers; Matthew Wade; Beau Webster	Peter Handscomb (c); Wes Agar; Scott Boland; Jackson Coleman; Travis Dean; Seb Gotch; Marcus Harris; Mackenzie Harvey; Nic Maddinson; Glenn Maxwell; Tom O'Connell; Matthew Short; Will Sutherland; Chris Tremain; Cameron White	Ashton Turner (c); Ashton Agar; Will Bosisto; Hilton Cartwright; Nathan Coulter-Nile; Cameron Green; Josh Inglis; Matt Kelly; Simon Mackin; Joel Paris; Josh Philippe; Jhye Richardson; D'Arcy Short; Marcus Stoinis; Andrew Tye; Usman Qadir; Jonathan Wells; Sam Whiteman

New South Wales captain Peter Nevill was ruled out of the tournament after suffering a broken thumb while batting in the nets at the WACA Ground prior to the start of the Blues' campaign. He was replaced in the squad by Jay Lenton, while Kurtis Patterson assumed captaincy duties.

Tasmanian all-rounder James Faulkner sustained a calf injury whilst playing for Lancashire Lightning in the semi-final of England's domestic T20 competition. He was replaced in the squad by Gurinder Sandhu.

South Australia's Daniel Worrall sustained a back injury and was replaced by allrounder Luke Robins in the squad prior to the tournament.

Simon Mackin, Will Bosisto and Sam Whiteman were added to the Western Australian squad after D'Arcy Short, Marcus Stoinis and Matt Kelly were ruled out for the start of the tournament through injury.

Queenslander Jimmy Peirson made an early recovery from his injury and joined their squad prior to the match against Tasmania.

Chris Green and Ben Dwarshuis were added to the New South Wales squad in place of Jason Sangha and Trent Copeland prior to their clash with Tasmania, to allow the latter two to play Grade Cricket.

Wicket keeper Peter Nevill returned to the New South Wales squad after making a quick recovery from a broken thumb. He replaced fellow wicket keeper Jay Lenton.

Pat Cummins was added to the New South Wales squad after recovering from a back injury.

== Debutants ==
The following players made their List A debuts throughout the competition.

Date	Name	Role	Batting	Bowling	Team	Against	Scores
16 September 2018	Tom O’Connell	All-rounder	Right-handed	Right-arm leg-break	Victoria	Queensland	12, 2/42
18 September 2018	Jack Edwards	All-rounder	Right-handed	Right-arm medium-fast	New South Wales	Western Australia	32, 0/1
18 September 2018	Jay Lenton	Wicket-keeper	Left-handed	Right-arm medium	New South Wales	Western Australia	0, 3c
18 September 2018	Daniel Sams	All-rounder	Left-handed	Left-arm fast-medium	New South Wales	Western Australia	62, 3/46
18 September 2018	Josh Philippe	Wicket-keeper batsman	Right-handed	Right-arm medium	Western Australia	New South Wales	59

== League stage ==
16 September
10:00
Scorecard

Victoria; 240 (48.3 overs)	v	Queensland; 227 (46.5 overs)
Glenn Maxwell 80 (91); Mark Steketee 4/35 (9 overs)		Mitchell Swepson 77 (78); Will Sutherland 5/45 (10 overs)

Victoria won by 13 runs
Riverway Stadium, Townsville
Umpires: Shawn Craig and Michael Graham-Smith
Player of the match: Will Sutherland (Victoria)

- Queensland won the toss and elected to field.
- Lachlan Pfeffer (Queensland) and Tom O'Connell (Victoria) made their List A debuts.
- Xavier Bartlett, Max Bryant (both Queensland), Nic Maddinson, Will Sutherland and Tom O'Connell (all three Victoria) debuted for their states.
- Will Sutherland (Victoria) took his first List A five wicket haul.
- Mitchell Swepson (Queensland) scored his first List A half century.
- Tom O'Connell (Victoria) became the youngest Australian leg-spinner to play List A cricket.

18 September
14:00 (D/N)
Scorecard

New South Wales; 204 (43.4 overs)	v	Western Australia; 6/206 (32.2 overs)
Daniel Sams 62 (60); Andrew Tye 3/30 (7 overs)		Ashton Turner 70* (55); Daniel Sams 3/46 (7 overs)

Western Australia won by 4 wickets
WACA Ground, Perth
Umpires: Greg Davidson and Phillip Gillespie
Player of the match: Daniel Sams (New South Wales)

- New South Wales won the toss and elected to bat.
- Jack Edwards, Jay Lenton and Daniel Sams (all New South Wales) and Josh Philippe (Western Australia) made their List A debuts.
- Cameron Green and Josh Inglis made their debuts for Western Australia.
- Daniel Sams (New South Wales) and Josh Philippe (Western Australia) scored their first List A half centuries.

19 September
10:00
Scorecard

Tasmania; 8/321 (50 overs)	v	Victoria; 256 (47.2 overs)
Matthew Wade 117 (74); Jackson Coleman 2/47 (10 overs)		Marcus Harris 69 (73); Clive Rose 4/42 (9.2 overs)

Tasmania won by 65 runs
Riverway Stadium, Townsville
Umpires: Shawn Craig and Michael Graham-Smith
Player of the match: Matthew Wade (Tasmania)

- Tasmania won the toss and elected to bat.
- Aaron Summers (Tasmania) made his List A debut.
- Matthew Wade (Tasmania) scored the fastest ever List A century by a Tasmanian.

20 September
14:00 (D/N)
Scorecard

New South Wales; 241 (49.1 overs)	v	South Australia; 3/245 (38.2 overs)
Daniel Hughes 79 (98); Adam Zampa 3/37 (10 overs)		Jake Weatherald 106* (98); Mickey Edwards 2/66 (9.2 overs)

South Australia won by 7 wickets
WACA Ground, Perth
Umpires: Phillip Gillespie and John Ward.
Player of the match: Jake Weatherald (South Australia)

- South Australia won the toss and elected to field.

22 September
10:00
Scorecard

Queensland; 6/316 (50 overs)	v	Tasmania; 6/317 (49 overs)
Chris Lynn 70 (65); Riley Meredith 3/62 (10 overs)		Ben McDermott 117 (125); Mark Steketee 4/84 (10 overs)

Tasmania won by 4 wickets
Riverway Stadium, Townsville
Umpires: Paul Wilson and Michael Graham-Smith
Player of the match: Ben McDermott (Tasmania)

- Queensland won the toss and elected to bat.
- Jack Prestwidge (Queensland) made his List A debut.
- Gurinder Sandhu made his debut for Tasmania.
- Charlie Hemphrey (Queensland) scored his maiden List A half century.

22 September
14:00 (D/N)
Scorecard

South Australia; 9/237 (50 overs)	v	Western Australia; 5/240 (45.1 overs)
Alex Carey 58 (59); Nathan Coulter-Nile 3/46 (10 overs)		Josh Inglis 50 (63); Kane Richardson 2/54 (10 overs)

Western Australia won by 5 wickets
WACA Ground, Perth
Umpires: Greg Davidson and John Ward
Player of the match: Nathan Coulter-Nile (Western Australia)

- Western Australia won the toss and elected to field.

23 September
09:30
Scorecard

Victoria; 327 (50 overs)	v	New South Wales; 261 (42 overs)
Cameron White 123 (139); Sean Abbott 5/70 (10 overs)		Moises Henriques 77 (67); Jackson Coleman 5/39 (7 overs)

Victoria won by 66 runs
North Sydney Oval, Sydney
Umpires: Geoff Joshua and Simon Lightbody
Player of the match: Cameron White (Victoria)

- New South Wales won the toss and elected to field.
- Sean Abbott (New South Wales) and Jackson Coleman (Victoria) both took their maiden List A five wicket hauls.

25 September
09:30
Scorecard

South Australia; 280 (48.5 overs)	v	Queensland; 3/281 (35.3 overs)
Tom Cooper 139 (134); Billy Stanlake 3/36 (10 overs)		Chris Lynn 106* (71); Adam Zampa 3/58 (10 overs)

Queensland won by 7 wickets
Hurstville Oval, Sydney
Umpires: Claire Polosak and Simon Fry
Player of the match: Billy Stanlake (Queensland)

- Queensland won the toss and elected to field.
- Matthew Kuhnemann made his debut for Queensland.
- Max Bryant (Queensland) scored the fastest ever List A half century by a Queenslander, reaching fifty off just 23 deliveries.

25 September
14:00 (D/N)
Scorecard

New South Wales; 239 (47.3 overs)	v	Tasmania; 151 (31.3 overs)
Jack Edwards 68 (50); Gurinder Sandhu 4/42 (8.3 overs)		Clive Rose 35 (50); Sean Abbott 5/43 (8 overs)

New South Wales won by 88 runs
North Sydney Oval, Sydney
Umpires: Sam Nogajski and Donovan Koch
Player of the match: Sean Abbott (New South Wales)

- Tasmania won the toss and elected to field.
- Jack Edwards (New South Wales) made his maiden List A half century.
- Daniel Sams (New South Wales) earned a state contract after gaining twelve upgrade points from four List A matches.

26 September
10:00
Scorecard

Victoria; 200 (45.4 overs)	v	Western Australia; 4/202 (28.3 overs)
Peter Handscomb 57 (81); Andrew Tye 3/47 (9 overs)		Josh Philippe 65 (52); Glenn Maxwell 1/15 (4 overs)

Western Australia won by 6 wickets
Junction Oval, St Kilda
Umpires: Geoff Joshua and Simon Lightbody
Player of the match: Andrew Tye (Western Australia)

- Victoria won the toss and elected to bat.
- Mackenzie Harvey (Victoria) made his List A debut.
- Usman Qadir made his debut for Western Australia.

27 September
09:30
Scorecard

South Australia; 7/236 (50 overs)	v	Tasmania; 7/238 (49 overs)
Jake Weatherald 79 (82); Riley Meredith 2/30 (8 overs)		Ben McDermott 102* (120); Kane Richardson 2/46 (10 overs)

Tasmania won by 3 wickets
Bankstown Oval, Sydney
Umpires: Nathan Johnstone and Simon Fry
Player of the match: Ben McDermott (Tasmania)

- South Australia won the toss and elected to bat.

28 September
09:30
Scorecard

Western Australia; 387 (47 overs)	v	Queensland; 271 (42.3 overs)
D'Arcy Short 257 (148); Matthew Kuhnemann 3/50 (8 overs)		Sam Heazlett 107 (102); Andrew Tye 6/46 (8.3 overs)

Western Australia won by 116 runs
Hurstville Oval, Sydney
Umpires: Gerard Abood and Tony Wilds
Player of the match: D'Arcy Short (Western Australia)

- Queensland won the toss and elected to field.

30 September
10:00
Scorecard

South Australia; 7/265 (50 overs)	v	Victoria; 257 (50 overs)
Callum Ferguson 133 (125); Fawad Ahmed 2/53 (10 overs)		Cameron White 81 (102); Joe Mennie 3/38 (10 overs)

South Australia won by 8 runs
Junction Oval, St Kilda
Umpires: David Shepard and John Ward
Player of the match: Callum Ferguson (South Australia)

- South Australia won the toss and elected to bat.
- Luke Robins (South Australia) made his List A debut.

1 October
09:30
Scorecard

Tasmania; 8/290 (50 overs)	v	Western Australia; 5/292 (40.3 overs)
George Bailey 79 (88); Usman Qadir 2/40 (10 overs)		Marcus Stoinis 93* (49); Jackson Bird 2/58 (8 overs)

Western Australia won by 5 wickets
Hurstville Oval, Sydney
Umpires: Paul Wilson and Tony Wilds
Player of the match: Marcus Stoinis (Western Australia)

- Western Australia won the toss and elected to field.

1 October
14:00 (D/N)
Scorecard

Queensland; 296 (47.2 overs)	v	New South Wales; 4/300 (45.4 overs)
Chris Lynn 135 (113); Chris Green 5/53 (10 overs)		Moises Henriques 134* (134); Charlie Hemphrey 1/22 (2 overs)

New South Wales won by 6 wickets
Drummoyne Oval, Sydney
Umpires: Gerard Abood and Simon Lightbody
Player of the match: Jack Edwards (New South Wales)

- Queensland won the toss and elected to bat.
- Andrew Gode (Queensland) made his List A debut.

== Play-offs ==
=== Bracket ===
Qualifying Finals
3 Oct, Sydney
Queensland	363/5
South Australia	334
4 Oct, Sydney
Victoria	win
New South Wales

Semi-finals
6 Oct, Sydney
Tasmania	180/4
Queensland	177
7 Oct, St Kilda
Western Australia	269
Victoria	332

Final
10 Oct, St Kilda
Tasmania	164
Victoria	274

=== Qualifying Finals ===
3 October
14:00 (D/N)
Scorecard

Queensland; 5/363 (50 overs)	v	South Australia; 334 (47.2 overs)
Sam Heazlett 83 (59); Joe Mennie 2/72 (10 overs)		Callum Ferguson 101 (80); Matthew Kuhnemann 3/60 (10 overs)

Queensland won by 24 runs (D/L method)
North Sydney Oval, Sydney
Umpires: John Ward and Gerard Abood
Player of the match: Mitchell Swepson (Queensland)

- South Australia won the toss and elected to field.
- South Australia's innings was reduced to 49 overs due to rain, and were set a target of 359 to win.

4 October
14:00 (D/N)
Scorecard

Victoria	v	New South Wales

No result
Drummoyne Oval, Sydney
Umpires: Greg Davidson and Simon Fry

- New South Wales won the toss and elected to field.
- The match was abandoned without a ball bowled due to wet weather. Victoria progressed on to the semi-finals after finishing in a higher position on the ladder.

=== Semi-finals ===
6 October
14:00 (D/N)
Scorecard

Queensland; 177 (44.5 overs)	v	Tasmania; 4/180 (37.2 overs)
Mark Steketee 30 (38); Clive Rose 2/14 (3.5 overs)		George Bailey 70* (97); Luke Feldman 2/20 (7 overs)

Tasmania won by 6 wickets
Drummoyne Oval, Sydney
Umpires: Gerard Abood and Simon Fry
Player of the match: Gurinder Sandhu (Tasmania)

- Tasmania won the toss and elected to field.
- Gabe Bell (Tasmania) made his List A debut.

7 October
10:30
Scorecard

Victoria; 332 (49.5 overs)	v	Western Australia; 269 (45.5 overs)
Peter Handscomb 80 (73); Nathan Coulter-Nile 3/50 (10 overs)		Josh Inglis 64 (68); Nic Maddinson 4/29 (4.5 overs)

Victoria won by 63 runs
Junction Oval, St Kilda
Umpires: Paul Wilson and Sam Nogajski
Player of the match: Marcus Harris (Victoria)

- Victoria won the toss and elected to bat.

=== Final ===
10 October
10:30
Scorecard

Victoria; 274 (50 overs)	v	Tasmania; 164 (40.4 overs)
Cameron White 88 (96); Gurinder Sandhu 7/56 (10 overs)		Alex Doolan 46 (73); Andrew Fekete 2/20 (6 overs)

Victoria won by 110 runs
Junction Oval, St Kilda
Umpires: Paul Wilson and Sam Nogajski
Player of the match: Peter Handscomb (Victoria)

- Victoria won the toss and elected to bat.
- Gurinder Sandhu (Tasmania) took a hat-trick in Victoria's innings dismissing Matthew Short, Fawad Ahmed and Andrew Fekete in consecutive deliveries.

== Statistics ==
=== Most Runs ===
Player	Team	Mat	Inns	NO	Runs	Avge	HS	100	50
Chris Lynn	Queensland	7	7	1	452	75.33	135	2	3
Ben McDermott	Tasmania	7	7	1	427	71.16	117	2	2
D'Arcy Short	Western Australia	5	5	0	404	80.80	257	1	1
Sam Heazlett	Queensland	7	7	0	380	54.28	107	1	2
Peter Handscomb	Victoria	8	7	0	361	51.57	89	0	4

=== Most wickets ===
Player	Team	Mat	Overs	Runs	Wkts	Avge	BBI	SR	4WI
Andrew Tye	Western Australia	6	54.3	291	18	16.16	6/46	18.1	1
Gurinder Sandhu	Tasmania	6	56.3	300	18	16.66	7/56	18.1	2
Mark Steketee	Queensland	7	66.2	424	14	30.28	4/35	28.4	2
Adam Zampa	South Australia	6	60.0	305	12	25.41	3/37	30.0	0
Sean Abbott	New South Wales	6	41.0	306	12	25.50	5/43	20.5	2
