= 2017–18 JLT One-Day Cup =

Cricket tournament

2017 JLT One-Day Cup
- 2017–18 JLT One-Day Cup logo
- Dates: 27 September 2017 – 21 October 2017
- Administrator: Cricket Australia
- Cricket format: List A
- Tournament format: Round-robin tournament
- Host(s): Sydney, Brisbane, Perth, Hobart
- Champions: Western Australia (13th title)
- Participants: 7
- Matches: 23
- Player of the series: Shaun Marsh (WA)
- Most runs: Shaun Marsh (WA) (412 runs)
- Most wickets: Joe Mennie (SA); Jhye Richardson (WA) (13 wickets each)

The 2017 JLT One-Day Cup was the 48th season of the official List A domestic cricket competition in Australia. It was played over a four-week period at the start of the domestic season to separate its schedule from the Sheffield Shield season. The tournament was held in Sydney, Brisbane, Perth and Hobart, with all 23 matches broadcast live on the Cricket Australia website and app. It was the first time in more than a decade that neither the Nine Network nor Fox Sports (Australia) had broadcast the tournament. The tournament was sponsored by Jardine Lloyd Thompson.

Western Australia finished top of the group stage, progressing directly to the final. South Australia and Victoria finished second and third respectively, progressing to the elimination final. South Australia won the elimination match by 176 runs, and in the final, Western Australia beat South Australia by 6 wickets.

== Points table ==
Pos	Team	Pld	W	L	T	NR	BP	Pts	NRR
1	Western Australia	6	5	1	0	0	2	22	0.886
2	South Australia	6	4	2	0	0	1	17	−0.017
3	Victoria	6	3	3	0	0	3	15	0.556
4	New South Wales	6	3	3	0	0	2	14	0.412
5	Queensland	6	3	3	0	0	1	13	0.013
6	Tasmania	6	2	4	0	0	2	10	−0.427
7	Cricket Australia XI	6	1	5	0	0	0	4	−1.312

RESULT POINTS:

- Win – 4
- Tie – 2 each
- No Result – 2 each
- Loss – 0
- Bonus Point – 1 (Run rate 1.25 times that of opposition.)
- Additional Bonus Point – 1 (Run rate twice that of opposition.)

== Squads ==
The following squads were named:

New South Wales	Queensland	South Australia	Tasmania	Victoria	Western Australia	Cricket Australia XI
Peter Nevill (c); Sean Abbott; Doug Bollinger; Harry Conway; Ed Cowan; Pat Cummins; Mickey Edwards; Ryan Gibson; Daniel Hughes; Jay Lenton; Nathan Lyon; Nic Maddinson; Arjun Nair; Kurtis Patterson; Gurinder Sandhu; Mitchell Starc; William Somerville	Usman Khawaja (c); Joe Burns; Ben Cutting; Brendan Doggett; Jason Floros; Cameron Gannon; Sam Heazlett; Marnus Labuschagne; Michael Neser; James Peirson; Matt Renshaw; Billy Stanlake; Mitchell Swepson; Jack Wildermuth	Callum Ferguson (c); Tom Andrews; Alex Carey; Tom Cooper; Michael Cormack; Spencer Johnson; Jake Lehmann; Joe Mennie; Alex Ross; Chadd Sayers; Kelvin Smith; Cameron Valente; Jake Weatherald; Nicholas Winter; Daniel Worrall	George Bailey (c); Jackson Bird; Nick Buchanan; Cameron Boyce; Alex Doolan; Jake Doran; Ben Dunk; Andrew Fekete; Ben McDermott; Riley Meredith; Simon Milenko; Sam Rainbird; Tom Rogers; Jordan Silk; Charlie Wakim	Cameron White (c); Wes Agar; Scott Boland; Travis Dean; Seb Gotch; Sam Harper; Marcus Harris; John Hastings; Jon Holland; Will Pucovski; Matthew Short; Peter Siddle; Blake Thomson; Chris Tremain; Will Sutherland	Mitchell Marsh (c); Cameron Bancroft; Will Bosisto; Josh Inglis; Matthew Kelly; Michael Klinger; Simon Mackin; Shaun Marsh; David Moody; Jhye Richardson; D'Arcy Short; Ashton Turner; Andrew Tye; Jonathan Wells	Beau Webster (c); Max Bryant; Jake Carder; Jackson Coleman; Daniel Fallins; David Grant; Clint Hinchliffe; Matthew Kuhnemann; Jonathan Merlo; Harry Nielsen; Ben Pengelley; Mark Steketee; Charles Stobo; Henry Thornton; Param Uppal; Mac Wright

== Fixtures ==
27 September
09:30
Scorecard

South Australia; 9/254 (50 overs)	v	Cricket Australia XI; 3/256 (46.5 overs)
Cameron Valente 100 (138); Jackson Coleman 4/46 (10 overs)		Beau Webster 121 (133); Daniel Worrall 1/40 (10 overs)

Cricket Australia XI won by 7 wickets
Allan Border Field, Brisbane
Umpires: Geoff Joshua and Michael Graham-Smith
Player of the match: Beau Webster (Cricket Australia XI)

- Cricket Australia XI won the toss and elected to field.
- Max Bryant, Jonathan Merlo, Ben Pengelley, Harry Nielsen, Param Uppal and Mac Wright (Cricket Australia XI) all made their List A debuts.

29 September
09:30
Scorecard

Cricket Australia XI; 7/279 (50 overs)	v	Queensland; 6/282 (48.3 overs)
Max Bryant 60 (48); Cameron Gannon 2/54 (9 overs)		Matthew Renshaw 67 (97); Mark Steketee 3/48 (10 overs)

Queensland won by 4 wickets
Allan Border Field, Brisbane
Umpires: Donovan Koch and Paul Wilson
Player of the match: Mitchell Swepson (Queensland)

- Queensland won the toss and elected to field.
- Marnus Labuschagne (Queensland) became the first fielder to be penalised under the new rule of "fake fielding".

29 September
14:00 (D/N)
Scorecard

Western Australia; 269/9 (50 overs)	v	New South Wales; 260 (49.2 overs)
Shaun Marsh 132* (136); Gurinder Sandhu 4/57 (9 overs)		Moises Henriques 72 (70); Jason Behrendorff 3/34 (9.2 overs)

Western Australia won by 9 runs
WACA, Perth
Umpires: Greg Davidson and Phillip Gillespie
Player of the match: Shaun Marsh (Western Australia)

- New South Wales won the toss and elected to field.
- Mickey Edwards (New South Wales) made his List A debut.

1 October
09:30
Scorecard

South Australia; 8/240 (50 overs)	v	Queensland; 157 (36.5 overs)
Tom Cooper 115* (107); Jack Wildermuth 4/39 (10 overs)		James Peirson 60 (69); Joe Mennie 5/36 (9.5 overs)

South Australia won by 83 runs
Allan Border Field, Brisbane
Umpires: Michael Graham-Smith and Paul Wilson
Player of the match: Tom Cooper (South Australia)

- Queensland won the toss and elected to field.

1 October
10:00
Scorecard

Western Australia; 4/283 (50 overs)	v	Victoria; 245 (46.5 overs)
Shaun Marsh 88 (112); Peter Siddle 2/48 (10 overs)		Seb Gotch 61 (61); Andrew Tye 3/37 (8.5 overs)

Western Australia won by 38 runs
WACA, Perth
Umpires: Shawn Craig and Tony Wilds
Player of the match: Shaun Marsh (Western Australia)

- Victoria won the toss and elected to field.

2 October
10:00
Scorecard

New South Wales; 6/316 (50 overs)	v	Tasmania; 214 (39.2 overs)
Nic Maddinson 137 (119); Cameron Boyce 2/50 (10 overs)		Jordan Silk 55 (52); Mickey Edwards 4/31 (9 overs)

New South Wales won by 102 runs
WACA, Perth
Umpires: Greg Davidson and Phillip Gillespie
Player of the match: Nic Maddinson (New South Wales)

- Tasmania won the toss and elected to field.
- Charlie Wakim (Tasmania) made his List A debut.

4 October
10:00
Scorecard

Victoria; 6/325 (50 overs)	v	Tasmania; 214 (46 overs)
Cameron White 165 (154); Andrew Fekete 4/48 (10 overs)		Ben McDermott 97 (124); Peter Siddle 3/27 (10 overs)

Victoria won by 111 runs
WACA, Perth
Umpires: Shawn Craig and Tony Wilds
Player of the match: Cameron White (Victoria)

- Victoria won the toss and elected to bat.

6 October
10:30
Scorecard

South Australia; 6/346 (50 overs)	v	New South Wales; 9/301 (49.3 overs)
Alex Ross 110 (85); Sean Abbott 3/59 (10 overs)		Daniel Hughes 105 (104); Joe Mennie 4/53 (10 overs)

South Australia won by 45 runs
Hurstville Oval, Sydney
Umpires: Greg Davidson and Michael Graham-Smith
Player of the match: Alex Ross (South Australia)

- New South Wales won the toss and elected to field.
- Alex Ross (South Australia) set a new record for the most runs scored in one over by an Australian in List A cricket (32).

7 October
14:30 (D/N)
Scorecard

Queensland; 6/309 (50 overs)	v	Victoria; 298 (49.4 overs)
Usman Khawaja 85 (97); Fawad Ahmed 3/44 (10 overs)		Peter Siddle 62 (45); Cameron Gannon 2/43 (8.4 overs)

Queensland won by 11 runs
North Sydney Oval, Sydney
Umpires: Geoff Joshua and Simon Lightbody
Player of the match: Usman Khawaja (Queensland)

- Victoria won the toss and elected to field.

7 October
14:00 (D/N)
Scorecard

Tasmania; 207 (49.5 overs)	v	Western Australia; 2/208 (36.4 overs)
Jordan Silk 80 (86); David Moody 3/47 (7.5 overs)		Mitchell Marsh 67* (49); Cameron Boyce 1/36 (10 overs)

Western Australia won by 8 wickets
WACA, Perth
Umpires: Shawn Craig and Phillip Gillespie
Player of the match: Shaun Marsh (Western Australia)

- Tasmania won the toss and elected to bat.
- Tom Rogers (Tasmania) and Matthew Kelly (Western Australia) both made their List A debuts.

8 October
10:30
Scorecard

New South Wales; 8/332 (50 overs)	v	Cricket Australia XI; 239 (41 overs)
Nic Maddinson 123 (113); Clint Hinchliffe 4/72 (10 overs)		Max Bryant 89 (61); Doug Bollinger 3/62 (10 overs)

New South Wales won by 93 runs
Hurstville Oval, Sydney
Umpires: Claire Polosak and Paul Wilson
Player of the match: Nic Maddinson (New South Wales)

- Cricket Australia XI won the toss and elected to field.
- Matthew Kuhnemann (Cricket Australia XI) made his List A debut.
- Claire Polosak became the first woman to stand as an onfield umpire in a men's domestic fixture in Australia.
- Peter Nevill (New South Wales) equalled the record for the most dismissals by a wicket-keeper in a List A game (8).

10 October
10:30
Scorecard

Tasmania; 6/315 (50 overs)	v	South Australia; 186 (39.2 overs)
George Bailey 86 (62); Michael Cormack 2/52 (9 overs)		Callum Ferguson 43 (45); Ben Dunk 3/14 (4.2 overs)

Tasmania won by 129 runs
North Sydney Oval, Sydney
Umpires: Gerard Abood and Simon Fry
Player of the match: George Bailey (Tasmania)

- South Australia have won the toss and elected to field.
- Nick Buchanan (Tasmania) made his List A debut.

10 October
10:30
Scorecard

Cricket Australia XI; 9/232 (50 overs)	v	Victoria; 3/233 (38.4 overs)
Harry Nielsen 94 (93); Chris Tremain 3/151 (10 overs)		Peter Handscomb 103* (73); Mark Steketee 2/57 (9.4 overs)

Victoria won by 7 wickets
Hurstville Oval, Sydney
Umpires: Simon Lightbody and Paul Wilson
Player of the match: Peter Handscomb (Victoria)

- Victoria won the toss and elected to field.
- Charles Stobo (Cricket Australia XI) and Blake Thomson (Victoria) both made their List A debuts.

11 October
10:30
Scorecard

Western Australia; 3/301 (41 overs)	v	Queensland; 9/292 (41 overs)
Michael Klinger 128 (120); Ben Cutting 2/64 (8 overs)		Michael Neser 122 (81); Matthew Kelly 4/25 (8 overs)

Western Australia won by 11 runs (D/L method)
Drummoyne Oval, Sydney
Umpires: Phillip Gillespie and Donovan Koch
Player of the match: Michael Neser (Queensland)

- Queensland won the toss and elected to field.
- The match was reduced to 41 overs per side due to rain, with Queensland set a target of 304 to win.

12 October
10:30
Scorecard

South Australia; 6/356 (50 overs)	v	Victoria; 8/345 (50 overs)
Callum Ferguson 73 (72); Fawad Ahmed 3/61 (10 overs)		Travis Dean 119 (98); Cameron Valente 3/54 (10 overs)

South Australia won by 11 runs
North Sydney Oval, Sydney
Umpires: Greg Davidson and Tony Wilds
Player of the match: Travis Dean (Victoria)

- Victoria won the toss and elected to field.
- Spencer Johnson (South Australia) made his List A debut.
- Will Sutherland (Victoria) became the youngest player to make his List A debut for Victoria.

13 October
10:30
Scorecard

Tasmania; 7/334 (50 overs)	v	Cricket Australia XI; 220 (46.2 overs)
George Bailey 126 (100); Clint Hinchliffe 2/51 (8 overs)		Jake Carder 54 (68); Cameron Boyce 3/61 (10 overs)

Tasmania won by 114 runs
Hurstville Oval, Sydney
Umpires: Simon Fry and Geoff Joshua
Player of the match: George Bailey (Tasmania)

- Tasmania won the toss and elected to bat.
- Daniel Fallins (Cricket Australia XI) made his List A debut.

13 October
14:30 (D/N)
Scorecard

Queensland; 7/282 (50 overs)	v	New South Wales; 4/283 (48.5 overs)
Usman Khawaja 138 (139); Mitchell Starc 3/48 (10 overs)		Daniel Hughes 122 (137); Cameron Gannon 1/39 (8.5 overs)

New South Wales won by 6 wickets
Drummoyne Oval, Sydney
Umpires: Gerard Abood and John Ward
Player of the match: Daniel Hughes (New South Wales)

- New South Wales won the toss and elected to field.

15 October
10:30
Scorecard

South Australia; 7/330 (50 overs)	v	Western Australia; 6/325 (50 overs)
Callum Ferguson 169 (138); Jhye Richardson 3/60 (10 overs)		Michael Klinger 143 (138); Tom Cooper 2/40 (6.2 overs)

South Australia won by 5 runs
Drummoyne Oval, Sydney
Umpires: Simon Lightbody and Paul Wilson
Player of the match: Callum Ferguson (South Australia)

- South Australia won the toss and elected to bat.

15 October
14:30 (D/N)
Scorecard

New South Wales; 144 (42.2 overs)	v	Victoria; 4/108 (26 overs)
Doug Bollinger 30 (34); Will Sutherland 4/11 (5.2 overs)		Matthew Short 43 (50); Mitchell Starc 3/35 (8 overs)

Victoria won by 35 runs (D/L method)
North Sydney Oval, Sydney
Umpires: Simon Fry and John Ward

- New South Wales won the toss and elected to bat.
- The match was abandoned during Victoria's innings due to an unsafe pitch, resulting in Victoria's qualification for the finals and New South Wales' elimination.
- William Somerville (New South Wales) made his List A debut.

17 October
10:30
Scorecard

Cricket Australia XI; 179 (48.4 overs)	v	Western Australia; 1/182 (30.2 overs)
Beau Webster 52 (106); Simon Mackin 5/33 (10 overs)		D'Arcy Short 119* (92); Beau Webster 1/17 (4 overs)

Western Australia won by 9 wickets
North Sydney Oval, Sydney
Umpires: Shawn Craig and Geoff Joshua
Player of the match: Simon Mackin (Western Australia)

- Cricket Australia XI won the toss and elected to bat.

17 October
14:00 (D/N)
Scorecard

Queensland; 8/339 (50 overs)	v	Tasmania; 256 (48.5 overs)
Joe Burns 79 (62); Simon Milenko 4/80 (10 overs)		George Bailey 62 (77); Mitchell Swepson 3/52 (10 overs)

Queensland won by 83 runs
Blundstone Arena, Hobart
Umpires: Gerard Abood and Sam Nogajski
Player of the match: Michael Neser (Queensland)

- Queensland won the toss and elected to bat.

== Finals ==
=== Elimination Final ===
Elimination Final
19 October
14:00 (D/N)
Scorecard

South Australia; 5/339 (48 overs)	v	Victoria; 168 (35.5 overs)
Jake Weatherald 116 (121); Daniel Christian 2/69 (10 overs)		Travis Dean 31 (36); Daniel Worrall 5/62 (10 overs)

South Australia won by 176 runs (D/L method)
Blundstone Arena, Hobart
Umpires: Gerard Abood and Sam Nogajski
Player of the match: Jake Weatherald (South Australia)

- Victoria won the toss and elected to field.
- The match was reduced to 48 overs per side due to rain with Victoria set a target of 345 runs.

=== Final ===
Final
21 October
14:00 (D/N)
Scorecard

South Australia; 9/248 (50 overs)	v	Western Australia; 4/250 (43.4 overs)
Tom Cooper 63 (84); Andrew Tye 2/43 (10 overs)		Mitchell Marsh 80* (80); Kane Richardson 1/47 (8.4 overs)

Western Australia won by 6 wickets
Blundstone Arena, Hobart
Umpires: Sam Nogajski and Paul Wilson
Player of the match: Mitchell Marsh (Western Australia)

- South Australia won the toss and elected to bat.

== Statistics ==
=== Most Runs ===
Player	Team	Mat	Inns	NO	Runs	Avge	HS	100	50
Shaun Marsh	Western Australia	7	6	1	412	82.40	132*	1	3
Nic Maddinson	New South Wales	6	6	0	398	66.33	137	2	1
Usman Khawaja	Queensland	6	6	0	380	63.33	138	1	2
Daniel Hughes	New South Wales	6	6	0	379	63.16	122	2	2
George Bailey	Tasmania	6	6	0	373	62.16	126	1	3

=== Most wickets ===
Player	Team	Mat	Balls	Runs	Wkts	Avge	BBI	SR	4WI
Joe Mennie	South Australia	7	377	293	13	22.53	5/36	29.0	1
Jhye Richardson	Western Australia	7	414	356	13	27.38	3/60	31.8	0
Sean Abbott	New South Wales	6	296	297	12	24.75	3/29	24.6	0
Fawad Ahmed	Victoria	7	354	322	12	26.83	3/24	29.5	0
Daniel Worrall	South Australia	8	424	394	12	33.83	5/62	35.3	1

== See also ==
- 2017–18 Sheffield Shield season
