= Luke Robins =

Australian cricketer (born 1994)

Personal information
- Full name: Luke J Robins
- Born: 18 May 1994 (age 32)
- Batting: Right-handed
- Bowling: Right-arm fast-medium
- Role: Bowler

Domestic team information
- Years: Team
- 2018-2021: South Australia (squad no. 11)

Career statistics
Competition	FC	LA
Matches	5	3
Runs scored	23	8
Batting average	3.83	8.00
100s/50s	0/0	0/0
Top score	12	8
Balls bowled	864	168
Wickets	9	4
Bowling average	51.44	38.00
5 wickets in innings	0	0
10 wickets in match	0	0
Best bowling	2/24	2/55
Catches/stumpings	1/–	1/–
- Source: Cricinfo, 4 October 2021

Luke Robins (born 18 May 1994) is an Australian cricketer. He made his List A debut for South Australia in the 2018–19 JLT One-Day Cup on 30 September 2018. He made his first-class debut for South Australia in the 2018–19 Sheffield Shield season on 3 March 2019. In April 2021, Robins was one of five players to be dropped by the South Australia cricket team, following a season without any wins.
