= Ben Pengelley =

Australian cricketer

Personal information
- Full name: Ben Pengelley
- Born: 16 February 1998 (age 28); Alice Springs, Northern Territory, Australia
- Batting: Left-handed
- Bowling: Left-arm fast-medium
- Role: All-rounder

Domestic team information
- Years: Team
- 2017–present: South Australia
- 2017/18: Cricket Australia XI
- LA debut: 27 September 2017 Cricket Australia XI v South Australia
- Last LA: 13 October 2017 Cricket Australia XI v Tasmania

Career statistics
Competition	LA
Matches	5
Runs scored	71
Batting average	17.75
100s/50s	0/1
Top score	53
Balls bowled	138
Wickets	2
Bowling average	75.50
5 wickets in innings	0
10 wickets in match	0
Best bowling	1/27
Catches/stumpings	1/–
- Source: Cricinfo, 10 April 2018

Ben Pengelley (born 16 February 1998) is an Australian cricketer. He made his List A debut for Cricket Australia XI in the 2017–18 JLT One-Day Cup on 27 September 2017.

== Career ==
Pengelley grew up in Yulara, Northern Territory. His family briefly moved to Western Australia before settling in Whyalla in South Australia, roughly 400 km north of Adelaide, where Pengelley finished high school. While living in Whyalla he started playing grade cricket for Adelaide Cricket Club despite the long commute to and from the city. In December 2016 Pengelley represented South Australia in the national under-19 championships as an all-rounder, scoring 359 runs and taking 8 wickets, and he was named in the team of the tournament. In grade cricket in 2016–17 he averaged an impressive 42.89 runs batting for Adelaide, and he made his Futures League debut for South Australia under-23s in the final round of the season.

In the 2017 winter Pengelley was selected as part of Australia's National Performance Squad to train for three months in Brisbane and tour India in the lead up to the summer despite not yet having a contract with any state team. After this he was given a rookie contract with South Australia cricket team for the 2017–18 season.

=== 2017–18 season ===
Pengelly was in the Cricket Australia XI squad for the 2017–18 JLT One-Day Cup. He made his List A debut for the side in the first match, which was against his home state of South Australia. He took his first career List A wicket, that of Alex Ross. He then scored his maiden List A century against Queensland in his second match, scoring 53 runs off 36 balls before being dismissed with an over left in the innings. He played five matches in the tournament and took two wickets in total.
