= Aaron Summers (cricketer) =

Australian cricketer (born 1996)

Personal information
- Full name: Aaron William Summers
- Born: 24 March 1996 (age 30); Perth, Western Australia
- Batting: Right-handed
- Bowling: Right-arm fast
- Role: Bowler

Domestic team information
- Years: Team
- 2017/18: Hobart Hurricanes (squad no. 35)
- 2018/19: Tasmania (squad no. 35)
- 2019: Karachi Kings (squad no. 35)
- 2020/21: Southern Punjab (squad no. 35)

Career statistics
Competition	LA	T20
Matches	7	3
Runs scored	42	–
Batting average	14.00	–
100s/50s	0/0	–
Top score	19	–
Balls bowled	306	66
Wickets	5	0
Bowling average	77.00	–
5 wickets in innings	0	–
10 wickets in match	0	–
Best bowling	3/72	–
Catches/stumpings	3/–	1/–
- Source: ESPNcricinfo, 31 January 2021

Aaron William Summers (born 24 March 1996) is an Australian former cricketer. He made his Twenty20 debut for Hobart Hurricanes in the 2017–18 Big Bash League season on 21 December 2017. He made his List A debut for Tasmania in the 2018–19 JLT One-Day Cup on 19 September 2018.

In July 2019, he was selected to play for the Belfast Titans in the inaugural edition of the Euro T20 Slam cricket tournament. However, the following month the tournament was cancelled.

In December 2020, it was announced that Summers would play in the 2020–21 Pakistan Cup, becoming the first Australian cricketer to play in a domestic cricket competition in Pakistan, after signing with Southern Punjab.

In May 2021, after playing professionally and working in Darwin, Northern Territory, Summers was arrested and charged in relation to seven counts of grooming and possessing child abuse material. In December 2021, after pleading guilty, he was jailed for three years and 11 months, and was registered as a sex offender.

After having served his jail sentence, Summers was extradited to Tasmania in April 2025 to face further charges. He pleaded not guilty to all charges in September 2025 and remained on bail. In June 2026, Summers changed his plea to guilty of two counts of penetrative sexual abuse of a child and one count of grooming with the intent of exposing a child to indecent material. Summers was sentenced to 2 and a half years in jail, however to only serve 10 months, with the rest of the term suspended.
