= Andrew Gode =

Australian cricketer (born 1990)

Personal information
- Full name: Andrew John Gode
- Born: 5 April 1990 (age 36); Southport, Queensland, Australia
- Batting: Right-handed
- Bowling: Right-arm leg break
- Role: All-rounder

Domestic team information
- Years: Team
- 2018-19: Queensland (squad no. 66)

Career statistics
| Competition | LA |
|---|---|
| Matches | 1 |
| Runs scored | 0 |
| Batting average | 0 |
| 100s/50s | 0/0 |
| Top score | 0 |
| Balls bowled | 28 |
| Wickets | 0 |
| Bowling average | - |
| 5 wickets in innings | 0 |
| 10 wickets in match | 0 |
| Best bowling | - |
| Catches/stumpings | 0/0 |
- Source: Cricinfo, 11 February 2026

Andrew John Gode (born 5 April 1990) is an Australian cricketer. He made his List A debut for Queensland in the 2018–19 JLT One-Day Cup on 1 October 2018.

He is now co-host of the podcast We Got the Chocolates.
