= 2017–18 Big Bash League season =

Cricket tournament

2017–18 Big Bash League
- Dates: 19 December 2017 – 4 February 2018
- Administrator: Cricket Australia
- Cricket format: Twenty20
- Tournament format(s): Group stage and knockout
- Champions: Adelaide Strikers (1st title)
- Participants: 8
- Matches: 43
- Attendance: 1,140,835 (26,531 per match)
- Player of the series: D'Arcy Short (Hobart Hurricanes)
- Most runs: D'Arcy Short (572), (Hobart Hurricanes)
- Most wickets: Rashid Khan (18), (Adelaide Strikers); Dwayne Bravo (18), (Melbourne Renegades)
- Official website: bigbash.com.au

The 2017–18 Big Bash League season or BBL|07 was the seventh season of the Big Bash League, the professional men's Twenty20 domestic cricket competition in Australia. The tournament started on 19 December 2017 and finished on 4 February 2018. Perth Scorchers were the defending champions. The competition was extended to a total of 40 group games for the first time, each team playing ten matches in the group-stage.

The title was won by Adelaide Strikers who defeated Hobart Hurricanes at the Adelaide Oval by 25 runs.

== Venues ==
Thirteen venues were selected to host the matches with Traeger Park, GMHBA Stadium and University of Tasmania Stadium all holding their first BBL match. The newly completed Optus Stadium was also added to the list of host grounds after the Perth Scorchers finished top of the table at the end of the main season, earning the right to host the first semi-final at the new stadium.

| Adelaide | Alice Springs | Brisbane | Canberra | Geelong |
|---|---|---|---|---|
| Adelaide Oval | Traeger Park | The Gabba | Manuka Oval | GMHBA Stadium |
| Capacity: 53,500 | Capacity: 10,000 | Capacity: 42,000 | Capacity: 12,000 | Capacity: 34,000 |
| Matches: 4 + 2 Finals | Matches: 1 | Matches: 5 | Matches: 1 | Matches: 1 |
| Hobart | Launceston | Melbourne | Melbourne | |
| Blundstone Arena | University of Tasmania Stadium | Etihad Stadium | Melbourne Cricket Ground | |
| Capacity: 19,500 | Capacity: 15,500 | Capacity: 53,359 | Capacity: 100,024 | |
| Matches: 4 | Matches: 1 | Matches: 4 | Matches: 5 | |
| Perth | Perth | Sydney | Sydney | |
| Optus Stadium | The WACA | Spotless Stadium | Sydney Cricket Ground | |
| Capacity: 60,000 | Capacity: 24,500 | Capacity: 24,000 | Capacity: 46,000 | |
| Matches: 1 | Matches: 5 | Matches: 4 | Matches: 5 | |
2017–18 Big Bash League season is located in Australia

== League stage ==
=== Points ===
| Pos | Team | Pld | W | L | NR | Pts | NRR | Qualification |
|---|---|---|---|---|---|---|---|---|
| 1 | Perth Scorchers | 10 | 8 | 2 | 0 | 16 | 0.154 | Advanced to semi-finals |
| 2 | Adelaide Strikers (C) | 10 | 7 | 3 | 0 | 14 | 0.801 | Advanced to semi-finals |
| 3 | Melbourne Renegades | 10 | 6 | 4 | 0 | 12 | 0.297 | Advanced to semi-finals |
| 4 | Hobart Hurricanes | 10 | 5 | 5 | 0 | 10 | −0.291 | Advanced to semi-finals |
| 5 | Sydney Sixers | 10 | 4 | 6 | 0 | 8 | 0.331 | |
| 6 | Sydney Thunder | 10 | 4 | 6 | 0 | 8 | −0.039 | |
| 7 | Brisbane Heat | 10 | 4 | 6 | 0 | 8 | −0.437 | |
| 8 | Melbourne Stars | 10 | 2 | 8 | 0 | 4 | −0.926 | |

(C) Champions

=== Matches ===
19 December 2017
19:40 (D/N)
Scorecard

| Sydney Sixers; 9/149 (20 overs) | v | Sydney Thunder (H); 5/150 (20 overs) |
| Sam Billings 32 (21); Fawad Ahmed 2/11 (4 overs) | | Shane Watson 77 (46); Daniel Sams 4/14 (4 overs) |

Sydney Thunder won by 5 wickets
Sydney Showground Stadium, Sydney
Attendance: 21,589
Umpires: Gerard Abood and Phillip Gillespie
Player of the match: Shane Watson (Sydney Thunder)

- Sydney Thunder won the toss and elected to field.
- Daniel Sams (Sydney Sixers) made his T20 debut.

20 December 2017
18:40 (D/N)
Scorecard

| (H) Brisbane Heat; 7/206 (20 overs) | v | Melbourne Stars; 6/191 (20 overs) |
| Alex Ross 51 (36); Marcus Stoinis 3/38 (4 overs) | | Marcus Stoinis 99 (51); Shadab Khan 2/41 (4 overs) |

Brisbane Heat won by 15 runs
The Gabba, Brisbane
Attendance: 27,433
Umpires: Shawn Craig and John Ward
Player of the match: Marcus Stoinis (Melbourne Stars)

- Melbourne Stars won the toss and elected to field.
- Brendan Doggett (Brisbane Heat) made his T20 debut.

21 December 2017
19:40 (D/N)
Scorecard

| (H) Hobart Hurricanes; 8/164 (20 overs) | v | Melbourne Renegades; 3/165 (18.3 overs) |
| D'Arcy Short 34 (19); Dwayne Bravo 5/28 (4 overs) | | Cameron White 79 (59); Jofra Archer 2/17 (4 overs) |

Melbourne Renegades won by 7 wickets
Bellerive Oval, Hobart
Attendance: 11,010
Umpires: Michael Graham-Smith and Sam Nogajski
Player of the match: Dwayne Bravo (Melbourne Renegades)

- Melbourne Renegades won the toss and elected to field
- Aaron Summers (Hobart Hurricanes) made his T20 debut.

22 December 2017
19:10 (D/N)
Scorecard

| (H) Adelaide Strikers; 6/163 (20 overs) | v | Sydney Thunder; 110 (17.4 overs) |
| Alex Carey 44 (26); Arjun Nair 3/36 (4 overs) | | Kurtis Patterson 48 (37); Ben Laughlin 4/26 (3.4 overs) |

Adelaide Strikers won by 53 runs
Adelaide Oval, Adelaide
Attendance: 36,278
Umpires: Greg Davidson and Simon Lightbody
Player of the match: Rashid Khan (Adelaide Strikers)

- Adelaide Strikers won the toss and elected to bat.

23 December 2017
16:10
Scorecard

| (H) Sydney Sixers; 132 (18.4 overs) | v | Perth Scorchers; 4/136 (18.1 overs) |
| Nic Maddinson 31 (33); Andrew Tye 4/21 (3.4 overs) | | Ashton Turner 52* (27); Sean Abbott 3/28 (3.1 overs) |

Perth Scorchers won by 6 wickets
Sydney Cricket Ground, Sydney
Attendance: 21,692
Umpires: Geoff Joshua and Rod Tucker
Player of the match: Ashton Turner (Perth Scorchers)

- Perth Scorchers won the toss and elected to field.
- Will Bosisto, Josh Philippe and Josh Inglis (Perth Scorchers) all made their T20 debut.
- Andrew Tye (Perth Scorchers) took a hat-trick.

23 December 2017
19:25 (D/N)
Scorecard

| Brisbane Heat; 8/132 (20 overs) | v | Melbourne Renegades (H); 3/137 (18.4 overs) |
| Alex Ross 48 (44); Jack Wildermuth 3/16 (4 overs) | | Tom Cooper 52* (44); Shadab Khan 2/17 (4 overs) |

Melbourne Renegades won by 7 wickets
Docklands Stadium, Melbourne
Attendance: 20,567
Umpires: John Ward and Paul Wilson
Player of the match: Jack Wildermuth (Melbourne Renegades)

- Melbourne Renegades won the toss and elected to field.

26 December 2017
16:10
Scorecard

| (H) Perth Scorchers; 6/142 (20 overs) | v | Melbourne Stars; 8/129 (20 overs) |
| Hilton Cartwright 58 (53); James Faulkner 2/19 (3 overs) | | James Faulkner 35* (31); Andrew Tye 5/23 (4 overs) |

Perth Scorchers won by 13 runs
WACA Ground, Perth
Attendance: 19,506
Umpires: Simon Fry and Simon Lightbody
Player of the match: Hilton Cartwright (Perth Scorchers)

- Melbourne Stars won the toss and elected to field.

27 December 2017
18:10 (D/N)
Scorecard

| Sydney Thunder; 4/149 (17 overs) | v | Brisbane Heat (H); 4/153 (16.5 overs) |
| Shane Watson 56 (34); Shadab Khan 2/27 (4 overs) | | Joe Burns 45* (35); Mitchell McClenaghan 2/45 (4 overs) |

Brisbane Heat won by 6 wickets (D/L)
The Gabba, Brisbane
Attendance: 34,343
Umpires: Gerard Abood and Tony Wilds
Player of the match: Alex Ross (Brisbane Heat)

- Sydney Thunder won the toss and elected to bat.
- Both innings were reduced to 17 overs due to a rain delay, with Brisbane Heat set a target of 151 to win by the D/L method.

28 December 2017
19:10 (D/N)
Scorecard

| Adelaide Strikers; 3/167 (20 overs) | v | Sydney Sixers (H); 8/161 (20 overs) |
| Alex Carey 83* (59); Ben Dwarshuis 2/41 (4 overs) | | Jordan Silk 50 (32); Rashid Khan 2/22 (4 overs) |

Adelaide Strikers won by 6 runs
Sydney Cricket Ground, Sydney
Attendance: 25,879
Umpires: Shawn Craig and Paul Wilson
Player of the match: Alex Carey (Adelaide Strikers)

- Sydney Sixers won the toss and elected to field.

29 December 2017
19:10 (D/N)
Scorecard

| (H) Melbourne Renegades; 9/130 (20 overs) | v | Perth Scorchers; 7/133 (19 overs) |
| Tom Cooper 34 (24); Mitchell Johnson 3/13 (4 overs) | | Michael Klinger 37 (27); Brad Hogg 2/16 (4 overs) |

Perth Scorchers won by 3 wickets
Etihad Stadium, Melbourne
Attendance: 30,018
Umpires: Phillip Gillespie and Tony Wilds
Player of the match: Mitchell Johnson (Perth Scorchers)

- Perth Scorchers won the toss and elected to field.

30 December 2017
19:10 (D/N)
Scorecard

| Sydney Thunder; 5/166 (20 overs) | v | Hobart Hurricanes (H); 109 (19.3 overs) |
| Jos Buttler 67 (41); Clive Rose 2/20 (4 overs) | | Alex Doolan 34 (32); Fawad Ahmed 2/14 (4 overs) |

Sydney Thunder won by 57 runs
University of Tasmania Stadium, Launceston
Attendance: 16,734
Umpires: Greg Davidson and Simon Fry
Player of the match: Jos Buttler (Sydney Thunder)

- Hobart Hurricanes won the toss and elected to field.
- Tom Rogers (Hobart Hurricanes) made his T20 debut.

31 December 2017
18:40 (D/N)
Scorecard

| (H) Adelaide Strikers; 7/147 (20 overs) | v | Brisbane Heat; 91 (16.2 overs) |
| Michael Neser 40* (26); Josh Lalor 3/40 (4 overs) | | Cameron Gannon 23 (26); Ben Laughlin 3/11 (2.2 overs) |

Adelaide Strikers won by 56 runs
Adelaide Oval, Adelaide
Attendance: 46,594
Umpires: Michael Graham-Smith and Geoff Joshua
Player of the match: Michael Neser (Adelaide Strikers)

- Adelaide Strikers won the toss and elected to bat

1 January 2018
18:25 (D/N)
Scorecard

| Hobart Hurricanes; 3/189 (20 overs) | v | Sydney Thunder (H); 8/180 (20 overs) |
| D'Arcy Short 97 (63); Fawad Ahmed 1/27 (4 overs) | | Jos Buttler 81 (43); Cameron Boyce 2/14 (3 overs) |

Hobart Hurricanes won by 9 runs
Spotless Stadium, Sydney
Attendance: 16,496
Umpires: Gerard Abood and Phillip Gillespie
Player of the match: D'Arcy Short (Hobart Hurricanes)

- Sydney Thunder won the toss and elected to field.

1 January 2018
18:20 (D/N)
Scorecard

| Sydney Sixers; 4/167 (20 Overs) | v | Perth Scorchers (H); 4/170 (19.1 Overs) |
| Jordan Silk 45 (33); David Willey 2/30 (4 Overs) | | Michael Klinger 83 (61); Daniel Sams 2/25 (3 Overs) |

Perth Scorchers won by 6 wickets
The WACA, Perth
Attendance: 20,982
Umpires: Donovan Koch and John Ward
Player of the match: Michael Klinger (Perth Scorchers)

- Perth Scorchers won the toss and elected to field.
- Tim David (Perth Scorchers) made his T20 debut.

2 January 2018
19:10 (D/N)
Scorecard

| (H) Melbourne Stars; 7/141 (20 overs) | v | Brisbane Heat; 1/144 (14.4 overs) |
| Glenn Maxwell 50 (39); Mitchell Swepson 3/14 (4 overs) | | Chris Lynn 63* (46); Liam Bowe 1/21 (2 overs) |

Brisbane Heat won by 9 wickets
Melbourne Cricket Ground, Melbourne
Attendance: 36,834
Umpires: Michael Graham-Smith and Geoff Joshua
Player of the match: Mitchell Swepson (Brisbane Heat)

- Brisbane Heat won the toss and elected to field

3 January 2018
19:10 (D/N)
Scorecard

| Sydney Sixers; 8/111 (20 overs) | v | Melbourne Renegades (H); 2/112 (15.3 overs) |
| Johan Botha 32* (23); Dwayne Bravo 3/29 (4 overs) | | Aaron Finch 51 (38); Ben Dwarshuis 1/19 (4 overs) |

Melbourne Renegades won by 8 wickets
GMHBA Stadium, Geelong
Attendance: 23,586
Umpires: Greg Davidson and Simon Fry
Player of the match: Aaron Finch (Melbourne Renegades)

- Melbourne Renegades won the toss and elected to field
- Mickey Edwards (Sydney Sixers) made his T20 debut.

4 January 2018
19:10 (D/N)
Scorecard

| (H) Hobart Hurricanes; 5/183 (20 overs) | v | Adelaide Strikers; 6/176 (20 overs) |
| D'Arcy Short 96 (58); Rashid Khan 2/18 (4 overs) | | Colin Ingram 66 (44); Jofra Archer 3/15 (4 overs) |

Hobart Hurricanes win by 7 runs
Bellerive Oval, Hobart
Attendance: 12,167
Umpires: Geoff Joshua and Sam Nogajski
Player of the match: D'Arcy Short (Hobart Hurricanes)

- Hobart Hurricanes won the toss and elected to bat

5 January 2018
18:10 (D/N)
Scorecard

| (H) Brisbane Heat; 6/191 (20 overs) | v | Perth Scorchers; 142 (19 overs) |
| Ben Cutting 46 (20); David Willey 2/40 (4 overs) | | Ashton Agar 31 (18); Brendan Doggett 5/35 (4 overs) |

Brisbane Heat won by 49 runs
The Gabba, Brisbane
Attendance: 35,564
Umpires: Phillip Gillespie and Tony Wilds
Player of the match: Ben Cutting (Brisbane Heat)

- Perth Scorchers won the toss and elected to field.

6 January 2018
19:10 (D/N)
Scorecard

| (H) Melbourne Stars; 4/157 (20 overs) | v | Melbourne Renegades; 4/159 (17.5 overs) |
| Ben Dunk 47 (30); Mohammad Nabi 1/27 (4 overs) | | Mohammad Nabi 52 (30); John Hastings 2/24 (3.5 overs) |

Melbourne Renegades won by 6 wickets
Melbourne Cricket Ground, Melbourne
Attendance: 48,086
Umpires: Shawn Craig and John Ward
Player of the match: Mohammad Nabi (Melbourne Renegades)

- Melbourne Renegades won the toss and elected to field
- Jackson Coleman (Melbourne Stars) made his T20 debut.

7 January 2018
19:10 (D/N)
Scorecard

| Adelaide Strikers; 7/158 (20 overs) | v | Sydney Thunder (H); 9/133 (20 overs) |
| Colin Ingram 48 (31); Fawad Ahmed 3/31 (4 overs) | | Ben Rohrer 29 (13); Michael Neser 3/29 (4 overs) |

Adelaide Strikers won by 25 runs
Spotless Stadium, Sydney
Attendance: 13,052
Umpires: Simon Fry and Simon Lightbody
Player of the match: Rashid Khan (Adelaide Strikers)

- Adelaide Strikers won the toss and elected to bat

8 January 2018
18:10 (D/N)
Scorecard

| (H) Hobart Hurricanes; 6/170 (20 overs) | v | Sydney Sixers; 4/165 (20 overs) |
| D'Arcy Short 42 (36); Sean Abbott 3/27 (4 overs) | | Sam Billings 61* (31); Tymal Mills 2/42 (4 overs) |

Hobart Hurricanes won by 5 runs
Bellerive Oval, Hobart
Attendance: 12,896
Umpires: Shawn Craig and Donovan Koch
Player of the match: Sam Billings (Sydney Sixers)

- Hobart Hurricanes won the toss and elected to bat.

8 January 2018
18:20 (D/N)
Scorecard

| Melbourne Renegades; 3/185 (20 overs) | v | Perth Scorchers (H); 5/186 (19.5 overs) |
| Cameron White 68* (30); Andrew Tye 2/36 (4 overs) | | Ashton Turner 70(32); Mohammed Nabi 1/30 (3.5 overs) |

Perth Scorchers won by 5 wickets
WACA Ground, Perth
Attendance: 22,475
Umpires: Michael Graham-Smith & Sam Nogajski
Player of the match: Ashton Turner (Perth Scorchers)

- Perth Scorchers won the toss and elected to field

9 January 2018
19:10 (D/N)
Scorecard

| Melbourne Stars; 6/151 (20 overs) | v | Adelaide Strikers (H); 2/152 (18.4 overs) |
| Glenn Maxwell 60 (39); Rashid Khan 1/23 (4 overs) | | Alex Carey 59* (52); Glenn Maxwell 1/24 (3 overs) |

Adelaide Strikers won by 8 wickets
Adelaide Oval, Adelaide
Attendance: 42,624
Umpires: Phillip Gillespie and Tony Wilds
Player of the match: Travis Head (Adelaide Strikers)

- Melbourne Stars won the toss and elected to bat

10 January 2018
18:40 (D/N)
Scorecard

| Hobart Hurricanes; 4/179 (20 overs) | v | Brisbane Heat (H); 8/176 (20 overs) |
| D'Arcy Short 122* (69); Ben Cutting 2/27 (4 overs) | | Sam Heazlett 45 (33); Cameron Boyce 2/23 (4 overs) |

Hobart Hurricanes won by 3 runs
The Gabba, Brisbane
Attendance: 33,017
Umpires: Greg Davidson and Simon Fry
Player of the match: D'Arcy Short (Hobart Hurricanes)

- Hobart Hurricanes won the toss and elected to bat.
- D'Arcy Short (Hobart Hurricanes) scored the highest individual score in a BBL match.

11 January 2018
19:40 (D/N)
Scorecard

| (H) Sydney Thunder; 4/175 (20 overs) | v | Perth Scorchers; 4/172 (20 overs) |
| Usman Khawaja 85 (51); Tim Bresnan 2/38 (4 overs) | | Cameron Bancroft 75* (56); Fawad Ahmed 1/19 (4 overs) |

Sydney Thunder won by 3 runs
Spotless Stadium, Sydney
Attendance: 14,706
Umpires: Phillip Gillespie and Tony Wilds
Player of the match: Usman Khawaja (Sydney Thunder)

- Sydney Thunder won the toss and elected to bat

12 January 2018
19:40 (D/N)
Scorecard

| Melbourne Stars; 4/167 (20 overs) | v | Melbourne Renegades (H); 9/144 (20 overs) |
| Kevin Pietersen 74 (46); Mohammad Nabi 2/15 (4 overs) | | Dwayne Bravo 26 (18); Jackson Coleman 3/27 (4 overs) |

Melbourne Stars won by 23 runs
Etihad Stadium, Melbourne
Attendance: 44,316
Umpires: Michael Graham-Smith and Geoff Joshua
Player of the match: Kevin Pietersen (Melbourne Stars)

- Melbourne Renegades won the toss and elected to field
- Daniel Fallins (Melbourne Stars) made his T20 debut.
- The crowd of 44,316 is the highest ever for a cricket match at Etihad Stadium.

13 January 2018
16:10
Scorecard

| (H) Adelaide Strikers; 112 (19.2 overs) | v | Perth Scorchers; 4/114 (18.2 overs) |
| Alex Carey 44 (32); Ashton Agar 3/19 (4 overs) | | Hilton Cartwright 47* (44); Michael Neser 2/18 (3.2 overs) |

Perth Scorchers won by 6 wickets
Traeger Park, Alice Springs
Attendance: 3,906
Umpires: Donovan Koch and John Ward
Player of the match: Ashton Agar (Perth Scorchers)

- Perth Scorchers won the toss and elected to field

13 January 2018
19:20 (D/N)
Scorecard

| Sydney Thunder; 6/156 (20 overs) | v | Sydney Sixers (H); 2/157 (20 overs) |
| Chris Green 49 (27); Moises Henriques 2/25 (3 overs) | | Daniel Hughes 66* (55); Fawad Ahmed 1/22 (4 overs) |

Sydney Sixers won by 8 wickets
Sydney Cricket Ground, Sydney
Attendance: 36,458
Umpires: Greg Davidson and Simon Lightbody
Player of the match: Chris Green (Sydney Thunder)

- Sydney Sixers won the toss and elected to field

15 January 2018
19:40 (D/N)
Scorecard

| Brisbane Heat; 8/165 (20 overs) | v | Hobart Hurricanes (H); 4/166 (18.2 overs) |
| Brendon McCullum 51 (38); Jofra Archer 2/32 (4 overs) | | D'Arcy Short 59 (49); Joe Burns 1/10 (1 over) |

Hobart Hurricanes won by 6 wickets
Bellerive Oval, Hobart
Attendance: 14,873
Umpires: Gerard Abood and Tony Wilds
Player of the match: Dan Christian (Hobart Hurricanes)

- Brisbane Heat won the toss and elected to bat

16 January 2018
19:40 (D/N)
Scorecard

| (H) Melbourne Stars; 7/128 (20 overs) | v | Sydney Sixers; 2/129 (15.1 overs) |
| Glenn Maxwell 28 (16); Nathan Lyon 3/18 (4 overs) | | Nic Maddinson 62 (31); Jackson Coleman 1/14 (1.1 overs) |

Sydney Sixers won by 8 wickets
Melbourne Cricket Ground, Melbourne
Attendance: 26,130
Umpires: Shawn Craig and John Ward
Player of the match: Nathan Lyon (Sydney Sixers)

- Sydney Sixers won the toss and elected to field

17 January 2018
19:10 (D/N)
Scorecard

| (H) Adelaide Strikers; 4/187 (20 overs) | v | Hobart Hurricanes; 4/176 (20 overs) |
| Alex Carey 100 (56); Jofra Archer 3/27 (4 overs) | | Alex Doolan 70* (55); Peter Siddle 1/18 (3 overs) |

Adelaide Strikers won by 11 runs
Adelaide Oval, Adelaide
Attendance: 40,355
Umpires: Greg Davidson and Simon Lightbody
Player of the match: Alex Carey (Adelaide Strikers)

- Adelaide Strikers won the toss and elected to bat

18 January 2018
19:40 (D/N)
Scorecard

| Brisbane Heat; 73 (16.4 overs) | v | Sydney Sixers (H); 1/74 (10 overs) |
| Alex Ross 15 (21); Sean Abbott 4/11 (4 overs) | | Daniel Hughes 37 (28); Yasir Shah 1/37 (4 overs) |

Sydney Sixers won by 9 wickets
Sydney Cricket Ground, Sydney
Attendance: 22,900
Umpires: Michael Graham-Smith and Geoff Joshua
Player of the match: Sean Abbott (Sydney Sixers)

- Sydney Sixers won the toss and elected to field.

20 January 2018
18:10 (D/N)
Scorecard

| (H) Melbourne Stars; 6/147 (20 overs) | v | Sydney Thunder; 3/149 (16.1 overs) |
| Peter Handscomb 57 (44); Chris Green 2/27 (4 overs) | | Shane Watson 49* (28); Liam Bowe 2/30 (4 overs) |

Sydney Thunder won by 7 wickets
Melbourne Cricket Ground, Melbourne
Attendance: 27,421
Umpires: Greg Davidson and Simon Lightbody
Player of the match: Shane Watson (Sydney Thunder)

- Sydney Thunder won the toss and elected to field

20 January 2018
18:20 (D/N)
Scorecard

| Hobart Hurricanes; 5/167 (20 overs) | v | Perth Scorchers (H); 5/168 (19.2 overs) |
| Simon Milenko 66* (37); Ashton Agar 2/14 (4 overs) | | Cameron Bancroft 54 (36); Tymal Mills 1/25 (4 overs) |

Perth Scorchers won by 5 wickets
WACA Ground, Perth
Attendance: 22,236
Umpires: Shawn Craig and Donovan Koch
Player of the match: Ashton Agar (Perth Scorchers)

- Perth Scorchers won the toss and elected to field.

22 January 2018
19:40 (D/N)
Scorecard

| Adelaide Strikers; 5/173 (20 overs) | v | Melbourne Renegades (H); 7/147 (20 overs) |
| Colin Ingram 68 (36); Dwayne Bravo 2/30 (4 overs) | | Brad Hodge 30* (18); Ben Laughlin 2/18 (4 overs) |

Adelaide Strikers won by 26 runs
Etihad Stadium, Melbourne
Attendance: 23,089
Umpires: Michael Graham-Smith and Geoff Joshua
Player of the match: Colin Ingram (Adelaide Strikers)

- Melbourne Renegades won the toss and elected to field

23 January 2018
19:40 (D/N)
Scorecard

| Melbourne Stars; 5/189 (20 overs) | v | Sydney Sixers (H); 5/190 (17.3 overs) |
| Glenn Maxwell 84 (47); Carlos Brathwaite 2/31 (4 overs) | | Joe Denly 72* (45); Evan Gulbis 2/22 (3 overs) |

Sydney Sixers won by 5 wickets
Sydney Cricket Ground, Sydney
Attendance: 17,145
Umpires: Phillip Gillespie and Tony Wilds
Player of the match: Joe Denly (Sydney Sixers)

- Sydney Sixers won the toss and elected to field

24 January 2018
19:40 (D/N)
Scorecard

| Melbourne Renegades; 6/189 (20 overs) | v | Sydney Thunder (H); 180 (20 overs) |
| Marcus Harris 64 (41); Gurinder Sandhu 2/37 (4 overs) | | Ben Rohrer 48 (21); Kane Richardson 4/22 (4 overs) |

Melbourne Renegades won by 9 runs
Manuka Oval, Canberra
Attendance: 11,319
Umpires: Shawn Craig and John Ward
Player of the match: Kane Richardson (Melbourne Renegades)

- Sydney Thunder won the toss and elected to field

25 January 2018
16:40
Scorecard

| Adelaide Strikers; 6/137 (20 overs) | v | Perth Scorchers (H); 6/141 (19.3 overs) |
| Jake Weatherald 56 (43); Jhye Richardson 2/23 (4 overs) | | Adam Voges 56* (45); Rashid Khan 3/20 (4 overs) |

Perth Scorchers won by 4 wickets
WACA Ground, Perth
Attendance: 22,355
Umpires: Greg Davidson and Simon Lightbody
Player of the match: Adam Voges (Perth Scorchers)

- Perth Scorchers won the toss and elected to field
- This was the last Big Bash League game at the WACA as all future Scorchers home games will be played at Optus Stadium

27 January 2018
16:10
Scorecard

| Hobart Hurricanes; 7/185 (20 overs) | v | Melbourne Stars (H); 7/186 (19.1 overs) |
| Dan Christian 56 (37); John Hastings 2/41 (4 overs) | | Kevin Pietersen 46 (23); Tymal Mills 2/56 (4 overs) |

Melbourne Stars won by 3 wickets
Melbourne Cricket Ground, Melbourne
Attendance: 19,671
Umpires: Michael Graham-Smith and Geoff Joshua
Player of the match: Kevin Pietersen (Melbourne Stars)

- Melbourne Stars won the toss and elected to field

27 January 2018
18:20 (D/N)
Scorecard

| Melbourne Renegades; 3/187 (20 overs) | v | Brisbane Heat (H); 161 (19.5 overs) |
| Tom Cooper 65* (36); Mitchell Swepson 1/27 (4 overs) | | Alex Ross 36 (27); Kane Richardson 4/35 (4 overs) |

Melbourne Renegades won by 26 runs
The Gabba, Brisbane
Attendance: 34,543
Umpires: Gerard Abood and Phillip Gillespie
Player of the match: Tom Cooper (Melbourne Renegades)

- Brisbane Heat won the toss and elected to field

== Play-offs ==
Semifinals
2 | Adelaide Strikers (H) | 5/178
3 | Melbourne Renegades | 4/177
4 | Hobart Hurricanes | 4/210
1 | Perth Scorchers (H) | 139

Final
2 | Adelaide Strikers (H) | 2/202
4 | Hobart Hurricanes | 5/177

=== Semi-final 1 ===
1 February 2018
16:40
Scorecard

| Hobart Hurricanes; 4/210 (20 overs) | v | Perth Scorchers (H); 139 (17.5 overs) |
| Matthew Wade 71 (45); Tim Bresnan 2/40 (4 overs) | | Tim Bresnan 43 (26); Dan Christian 4/17 (3.5 overs) |

Hobart Hurricanes won by 71 runs
Optus Stadium, Perth
Attendance: 52,960
Umpires: Gerard Abood and Sam Nogajski
Player of the match: Matthew Wade (Hobart Hurricanes)

- Perth Scorchers won the toss and elected to field
- Riley Meredith (Hobart Hurricanes) made his T20 debut.
- Double header with Semi-final 1 of the Women's BBL.

=== Semi-final 2 ===
2 February 2018
19:10 (D/N)
Scorecard

| (H) Adelaide Strikers; 5/178 (20 overs) | v | Melbourne Renegades; 4/177 (20 overs) |
| Travis Head 85* (57); Joe Mennie 1/21 (4 overs) | | Marcus Harris 45 (27); Travis Head 1/27 (4 overs) |

Adelaide Strikers won by 1 run
Adelaide Oval, Adelaide
Attendance: 36,298
Umpires: Shawn Craig and Phillip Gillespie
Player of the match: Travis Head (Adelaide Strikers)

- Adelaide Strikers won the toss and elected to bat
- Harry Nielsen (Adelaide Strikers) made his T20 debut.
- Double header with Semi-final 2 of the Women's BBL.

=== Final ===
4 February 2018
16:00
Scorecard

| (H) Adelaide Strikers; 2/202 (20 overs) | v | Hobart Hurricanes; 5/177 (20 overs) |
| Jake Weatherald 115 (70); Daniel Christian 1/38 (4 overs) | | D'Arcy Short 68 (44); Peter Siddle 3/17 (4 overs) |

Adelaide Strikers won by 25 runs
Adelaide Oval, Adelaide
Attendance: 40,732
Umpires: Shawn Craig and Phillip Gillespie
Player of the match: Jake Weatherald (Adelaide Strikers)

- Adelaide Strikers won the toss and elected to bat
- Adelaide Strikers won their first title
- Double header with the Final of the Women's BBL.

== Statistics ==
Most runs
| Player | Team | Runs |
|---|---|---|
| D'Arcy Short | Hobart Hurricanes | 572 |
| Alex Carey | Adelaide Strikers | 443 |
| Jake Weatherald | Adelaide Strikers | 383 |
| Travis Head | Adelaide Strikers | 374 |
| Shane Watson | Sydney Thunder | 331 |

- Source: ESPNcricinfo

Most wickets
| Player | Team | Wickets |
|---|---|---|
| Rashid Khan | Adelaide Strikers | 18 |
| Dwayne Bravo | Melbourne Renegades | 18 |
| Andrew Tye | Perth Scorchers | 16 |
| Ben Laughlin | Adelaide Strikers | 16 |
| Jofra Archer | Hobart Hurricanes | 16 |

- Source: ESPNcricinfo

== TV audience ==
This was the last season BBL games in Australia were broadcast by the free-to-air channel Network Ten.

Following are the television ratings for 2017–18 BBL season in Australia.

| Match No | Teams | Average TV Ratings | | | |
| Match No | Teams | National | | 5 metro cities | |
| Match No | Teams | Session 1 | Session 2 | Session 1 | Session 2 |
|---|---|---|---|---|---|
| 1 | Sydney Thunder vs Sydney Sixers | 1,180,000 | 1,160,000 | 786,000 | 819,000 |
| 2 | Brisbane Heat vs Melbourne Stars | 1,200,000 | 1,240,000 | 826,000 | 860,000 |
| 3 | Hobart Hurricanes vs Melbourne Renegades | 1,100,000 | 1,230,000 | 747,000 | 856,000 |
| 4 | Adelaide Strikers vs Sydney Thunder | 989,000 | 1,130,000 | 684,000 | 779,000 |
| 5 | Sydney Sixers vs Perth Scorchers | 631,000 | 767,000 | 429,000 | 511,000 |
| 6 | Melbourne Renegades vs Brisbane Heat | 975,000 | 1,090,000 | 660,000 | 765,000 |
| 7 | Perth Scorchers vs Melbourne Stars | 765,000 | 1,050,000 | 520,000 | 731,000 |
| 8 | Brisbane Heat vs Sydney Thunder | 845,000 | 1,190,000 | 574,000 | 827,000 |
| 9 | Sydney Sixers vs Adelaide Strikers | 737,000 | 1,060,000 | 507,000 | 727,000 |
| 10 | Melbourne Renegades vs Perth Scorchers | 865,000 | 1,100,000 | 600,000 | 788,000 |
| 11 | Hobart Hurricanes vs Sydney Thunder | 843,000 | 950,000 | 560,000 | 655,000 |
| 12 | Adelaide Strikers vs Brisbane Heat | 763,000 | 858,000 | 544,000 | 626,000 |
| 13 | Sydney Thunder vs Hobart Hurricanes | 771,000 | 1,200,000 | 529,000 | 800,000 |
| 14 | Perth Scorchers vs Sydney Sixers | 977,000 | 657,000 | 687,000 | 475,000 |
| 15 | Melbourne Stars vs Brisbane Heat | 1,030,000 | 1,340,000 | 701,000 | 945,000 |
| 16 | Melbourne Renegades vs Sydney Sixers | 916,000 | 1,170,000 | 594,000 | 771,000 |
| 17 | Hobart Hurricanes vs Adelaide Strikers | 751,000 | 1,160,000 | 491,000 | 785,000 |
| 18 | Brisbane Heat vs Perth Scorchers | 919,000 | 1,190,000 | 640,000 | 823,000 |
| 19 | Melbourne Stars vs Melbourne Renegades | 876,000 | 1,120,000 | 620,000 | 789,000 |
| 20 | Sydney Thunder vs Adelaide Strikers | 886,000 | 1,150,000 | 625,000 | 798,000 |
| 21 | Hobart Hurricanes vs Sydney Sixers | 571,000 | 1,060,000 | 374,000 | 714,000 |
| 22 | Perth Scorchers vs Melbourne Renegades | 971,000 | 621,000 | 687,000 | 452,000 |
| 23 | Adelaide Strikers vs Melbourne Stars | 1,130,000 | 1,170,000 | 786,000 | 832,000 |
| 24 | Brisbane Heat vs Hobart Hurricanes | 1,070,000 | 1,210,000 | 710,000 | 830,000 |
| 25 | Sydney Thunder vs Perth Scorchers | 1,070,000 | 1,120,000 | 715,000 | 785,000 |
| 26 | Melbourne Renegades vs Melbourne Stars | 1,040,000 | 1,120,000 | 670,000 | 751,000 |
| 27 | Adelaide Strikers vs Perth Scorchers | 618,000 | 726,000 | 440,000 | 513,000 |
| 28 | Sydney Sixers vs Sydney Thunder | 891,000 | 1,040,000 | 602,000 | 714,000 |
| 29 | Hobart Hurricanes vs Brisbane Heat | 1,040,000 | 1,190,000 | 667,000 | 794,000 |
| 30 | Melbourne Stars vs Sydney Sixers | 928,000 | 982,000 | 615,000 | 673,000 |
| 31 | Adelaide Strikers vs Hobart Hurricanes | 980,000 | 1,160,000 | 648,000 | 799,000 |
| 32 | Sydney Sixers vs Brisbane Heat | 778,000 | 873,000 | 516,000 | 587,000 |
| 33 | Melbourne Stars vs Sydney Thunder | 540,000 | 849,000 | 329,000 | 533,000 |
| 34 | Perth Scorchers vs Hobart Hurricanes | 763,000 | 602,000 | 514,000 | 439,000 |
| 35 | Melbourne Renegades vs Adelaide Strikers | 883,000 | 853,000 | 603,000 | 607,000 |
| 36 | Sydney Sixers vs Melbourne Stars | 937,000 | 868,000 | 638,000 | 586,000 |
| 37 | Sydney Thunder vs Melbourne Renegades | 808,000 | 873,000 | 532,000 | 597,000 |
| 38 | Perth Scorchers vs Adelaide Strikers | 827,000 | 1,040,000 | 569,000 | 738,000 |
| 39 | Melbourne Stars vs Hobart Hurricanes | 564,000 | 666,000 | 362,000 | 431,000 |
| 40 | Brisbane Heat vs Melbourne Renegades | 742,000 | 797,000 | 481,000 | 553,000 |
| SF1 | Perth Scorchers vs Hobart Hurricanes | 1,190,000 | 1,270,000 | 788,000 | 866,000 |
| SF2 | Adelaide Strikers vs Melbourne Renegades | 1,050,000 | 1,340,000 | 739,000 | 991,000 |
| Final | Adelaide Strikers vs Hobart Hurricanes | 1,190,000 | 1,520,000 | 806,000 | 1,040,000 |
