= Blake Thomson =

Australian cricketer (born 1997)

Personal information
- Born: 9 December 1997 (age 28)

Career statistics
Competition	List A
Matches	3
Runs scored	41
Batting average	41.00
100s/50s	0/0
Top score	24
Balls bowled	2
Wickets	0
Bowling average	–
5 wickets in innings	–
10 wickets in match	–
Best bowling	–
Catches/stumpings	3/–
- Source: Cricinfo, 5 October 2021

Blake Thomson (born 9 December 1997) is an Australian cricketer. He made his List A debut for Victoria in the 2017–18 JLT One-Day Cup on 10 October 2017.
