= Jay Lenton =

Australian cricketer (born 1990)

Personal information
- Full name: Jay Stephen Lenton
- Born: 10 August 1990 (age 36); Belmont, New South Wales, Australia
- Batting: Left-handed
- Bowling: Right-arm medium
- Role: Wicket-keeper

Domestic team information
- Years: Team
- 2015–present: New South Wales
- 2016–present: Sydney Thunder (squad no. 70)
- First-class debut: 6 November 2015 NSW v Victoria
- Twenty20 debut: 1 January 2017 Thunder v Scorchers

Career statistics
Competition	FC	LA	T20
Matches	3	4	22
Runs scored	22	33	141
Batting average	7.33	8.25	23.50
100s/50s	0/0	0/0	0/0
Top score	16	18	27*
Catches/stumpings	3/1	10/0	12/5
- Source: Cricket Archive, 22 October 2022

Jay Stephen Lenton (born 10 August 1990) is an Australian cricketer who plays for New South Wales. A wicket-keeper, he made his first-class debut on 6 November 2015 in the 2015–16 Sheffield Shield. He made his Twenty20 (T20) debut for Sydney Thunder on 1 January 2017 in the 2016–17 Big Bash League season. He made his List A debut for New South Wales in the 2018–19 JLT One-Day Cup on 18 September 2018.

He was appointed as the assistant coach of the Sydney Sixers ahead of the 2021–22 Big Bash League season. Just hours prior to the start of the challenger knockout match against the Adelaide Strikers during the 2021–22 BBL season, he was formally added to the lineup of Sydney Sixers as the local replacement player for Josh Philippe who was tested positive for COVID-19. Lenton was formally added to the BBL's local replacement player pool before being included to the Sydney Sixers squad due to the non availability of wicket-keepers in the original pool of players.
