= Daniel Sams =

Australian cricketer

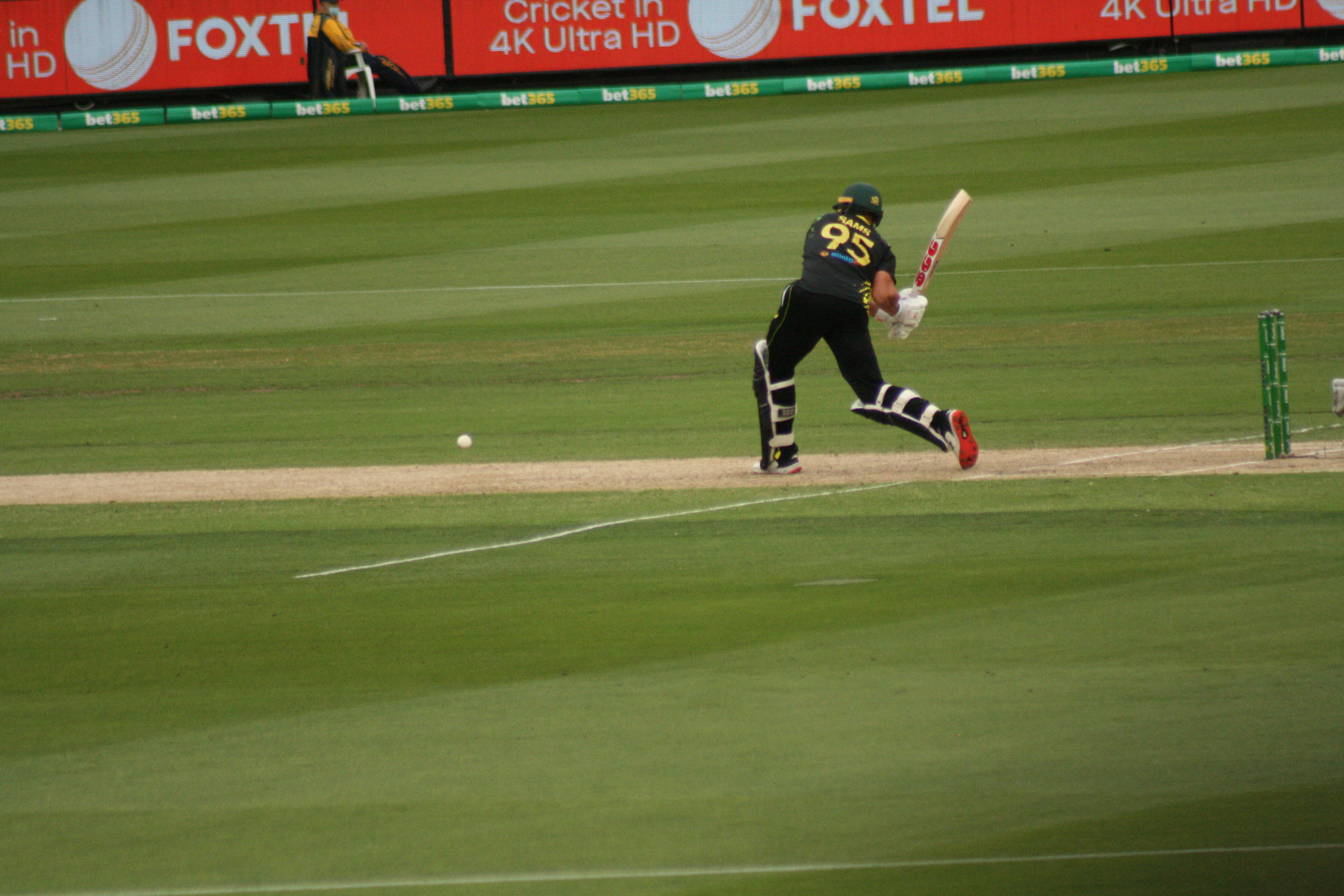
- Sams batting in the final T20 match of Sri Lanka's 2021–22 tour of Australia at the MCG, February 2022

Personal information
- Full name: Daniel Richard Sams
- Born: 27 October 1992 (age 34); Milperra, New South Wales, Australia
- Nickname: Karate Kid
- Height: 185 cm (6 ft 1 in)
- Batting: Right-handed
- Bowling: Left-arm fast-medium
- Role: All-rounder

International information
- National side: Australia (2020–2022)
- T20I debut (cap 95): 6 December 2020 v India
- Last T20I: 9 October 2022 v England
- T20I shirt no.: 95

Domestic team information
- Years: Team
- 2017/18: Canterbury
- 2017/18: Sydney Sixers (squad no. 27)
- 2018/19–2022/23: New South Wales (squad no. 95)
- 2018/19–present: Sydney Thunder (squad no. 95)
- 2020: Delhi Capitals (squad no. 95)
- 2021: Royal Challengers Bangalore
- 2022: Mumbai Indians
- 2022–2024: Essex
- 2022–2023: Trent Rockets
- 2023: Texas Super Kings
- 2024: Karachi Kings
- 2024: Sharjah Warriorz
- 2025: Peshawar Zalmi
- 2025: Nottinghamshire
- 2026–present: Lahore Qalandars
- 2026: Somerset

Career statistics
Competition	T20I	FC	LA	T20
Matches	10	5	22	240
Runs scored	106	255	463	2,504
Batting average	26.50	25.50	24.36	16.91
100s/50s	0/0	0/2	0/2	0/7
Top score	41	88	62	98*
Balls bowled	180	928	945	4,801
Wickets	7	13	26	292
Bowling average	43.57	38.00	33.65	24.51
5 wickets in innings	0	0	1	1
10 wickets in match	0	0	0	0
Best bowling	2/33	4/55	5/46	5/30
Catches/stumpings	4/–	2/–	5/–	91/–
- Source: ESPNcricinfo, 4 September 2026

Daniel Richard Sams (born 27 October 1992) is an Australian international cricketer. Nicknamed "the Karate Kid", he made his international debut for the Australia cricket team in December 2020.

== Career ==
Sams made his first-class cricket debut for New Zealand team Canterbury in the 2017–18 Plunket Shield season on 30 October 2017. He made his Twenty20 debut for Sydney Sixers in the 2017–18 Big Bash League season in December 2017, taking four wickets for fourteen runs, at the time the best figures by a debutant in the tournament. He made his List A debut for New South Wales in the 2018–19 JLT One-Day Cup in September 2018.

In June 2019, Sams was selected to play for the Vancouver Knights franchise team in the 2019 Global T20 Canada tournament. In July 2020, Sams was named in a 26-man preliminary squad of players to begin training ahead of a possible tour to England following the COVID-19 pandemic and was later included in the tour party, although he did not play a match.

In August 2020, Sams was picked by Delhi Capitals for the 2020 Indian Premier League and at the start of the following season was traded to Royal Challengers Bangalore.

In October 2020, Sams was named in Australia's squad for the limited overs matches against the touring Indian team. He made his Twenty20 International (T20I) debut for in December 2020. In August 2021, Sams was named as one of three players as injury cover in Australia's squad for the 2021 ICC Men's T20 World Cup.

In February 2022, Sams was selected in the Australian squad to play in the five Twenty20 International (T20I) matches against Sri Lanka. Later the same month, he was bought by the Mumbai Indians in the auction for the 2022 Indian Premier League tournament.

In June 2023, Sams joined the Texas Super Kings squad for the inaugural season of Major League Cricket.

In February 2024, Sams played for Karachi Kings in Pakistan Super League

In November 2024, Sams signed for Nottinghamshire County Cricket Club to play in the 2025 T20 Blast.

In January 2025, Sams collided with Cameron Bancroft going for a catch in the outfield whilst playing in a BBL match against the Perth Scorchers. Their heads collided, and both were treated for concussion. Bancroft was left with a broken shoulder and nose, however was able to walk off the field. Sams, however, was knocked unconscious, exhibiting the fencing response, and was stretchered off the ground. Both were taken to hospital, diagnosed with concussion, and discharged the following afternoon. Sams was cleared of any fractures, however was ruled out for at least the next 12 days under the Cricket Australia concussion protocol. Bancroft was sidelined for "an extended period" due to his fractures.

In December 2025, Sams agreed to join Somerset County Cricket Club for the 2026 T20 Blast.

He will play for Lahore Qalandars in the Pakistan Super League season 2026.
