= Michael Cormack (cricketer) =

Australian cricketer

Personal information
- Full name: Michael James Alan Cormack
- Born: 29 June 1997 (age 29); Adelaide, South Australia, Australia
- Batting: Right-handed
- Bowling: Right-arm offbreak
- Role: Bowler

Domestic team information
- Years: Team
- 2016/17–2017/18: South Australia
- LA debut: 12 October 2016 South Australia v New South Wales
- Last LA: 12 October 2017 South Australia v Victoria

Career statistics
Competition	List A
Matches	6
Runs scored	18
Batting average	9.00
100s/50s	0/0
Top score	15
Balls bowled	318
Wickets	5
Bowling average	64.80
5 wickets in innings	0
10 wickets in match	0
Best bowling	2/52
Catches/stumpings	0/–
- Source: ESPNcricinfo, 21 October 2017

Michael Cormack (born 29 June 1997) is an Australian cricketer. He is currently contracted with South Australia.

== Cricket career ==
Cormack first made his name in Australia's Under-19 National Championships, in which he was the leading wicket-taker with 21 wickets and a bowling average of 16.57. He started playing for South Australia in the Futures League in the 2015–16 season and was named in Australia's squad for the 2016 Under-19 Cricket World Cup, though Australia pulled out of the tournament in Bangladesh due to security concerns.

Cormack was given a rookie contract with South Australia for the 2016–17 season and was named in the state's squad for the 2016–17 Matador BBQs One-Day Cup. He made his List A debut on 12 October 2016 against New South Wales. He was thrown in the deep end when the team's captain, Callum Ferguson, decided he would open the bowling after New South Wales won the toss and chose to bat first. Making the task more daunting was that four of New South Wales' top six batsmen had represented Australia in international matches. Despite the difficult task presented to him, Cormack impressed with bowling figures of 1/42 from 10 overs, taking the key wicket of New South Wales captain Moises Henriques. After the one-day tournament, Cormack spent the rest of the season playing for South Australia in the Futures League and also played for a South Australia XI in a tour match against the touring South Africans.

Cormack was chosen to be a part of Australia's National Performance Squad in 2017 and his rookie contract with South Australia was renewed for the 2017–18 season. South Australian coach Jamie Siddons was excited ahead of the season of the prospect of Cormack playing a few games for the team because of his ability to bowl a doosra, a ball which spins in the opposite direction to his normal delivery. He played four matches for the Redbacks during the 2017–18 JLT One-Day Cup and was selected to play for a Cricket Australia XI in a tour match at Adelaide Oval against the touring England Test team.
