= Mickey Edwards (cricketer) =

Australian cricketer

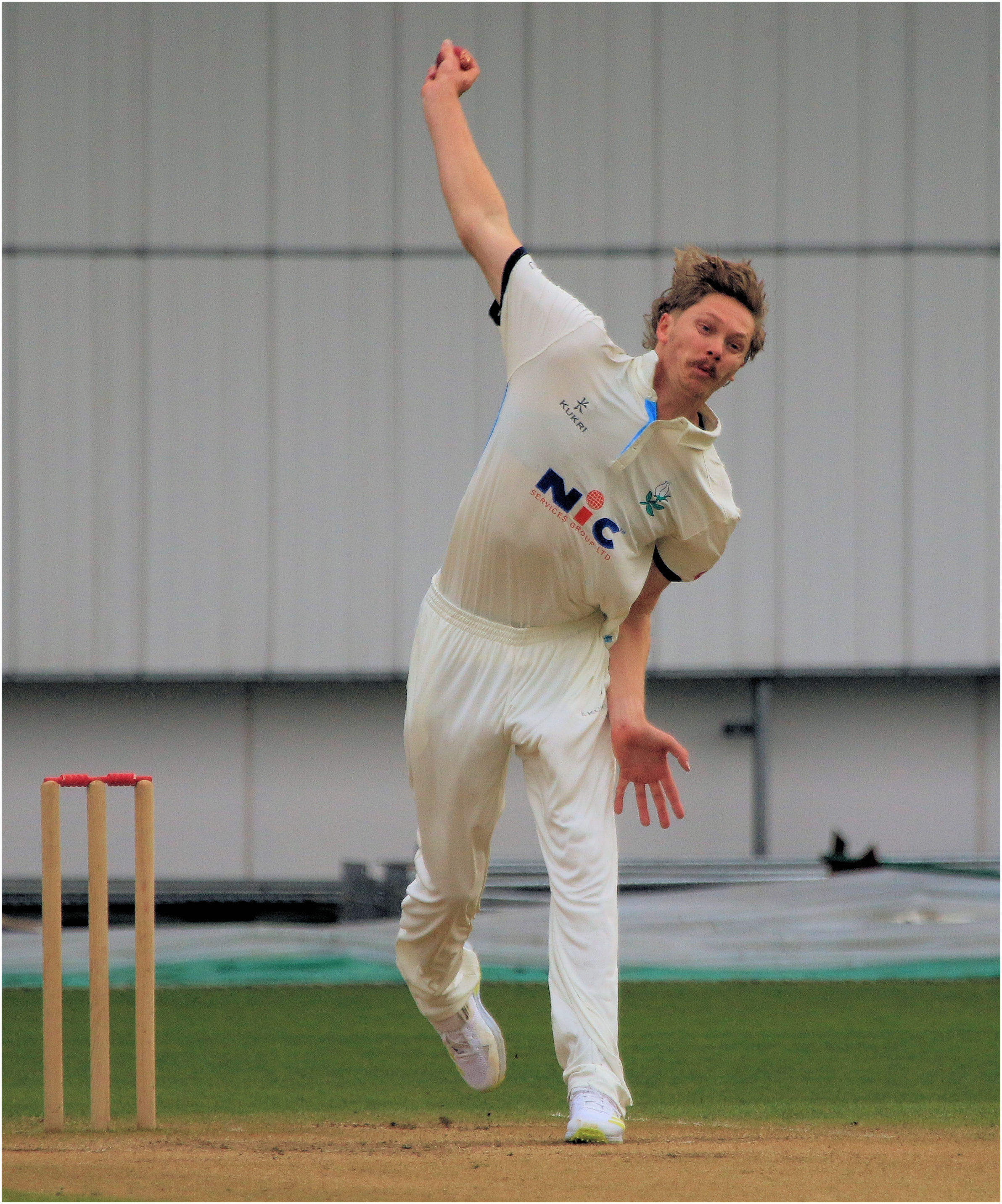
- Edwards in 2024

Personal information
- Full name: Michael William Edwards
- Born: 23 December 1994 (age 31); Sydney, New South Wales, Australia
- Height: 198 cm (6 ft 6 in)
- Batting: Right-handed
- Bowling: Right-arm fast-medium
- Role: Bowler
- Relatives: Jack Edwards (brother)

Domestic team information
- Years: Team
- 2017/18–2022/23: New South Wales (squad no. 78)
- 2017/18–2024: Sydney Sixers (squad no. 78)
- 2023–2024: Yorkshire (squad no. 78)

Career statistics
Competition	FC	LA	T20
Matches	9	10	3
Runs scored	107	29	0
Batting average	8.23	9.66	–
100s/50s	0/0	0/0	0/0
Top score	19*	11	0*
Balls bowled	1,095	440	54
Wickets	15	11	2
Bowling average	44.46	38.81	42.00
5 wickets in innings	0	0	0
10 wickets in match	0	0	0
Best bowling	3/54	4/31	1/19
Catches/stumpings	3/–	1/–	3/–
- Source: ESPNcricinfo, 20 August 2024

Michael William Edwards (born 23 December 1994) is an Australian retired cricketer. He represented New South Wales in the JLT Cup and Sheffield Shield competitions. When not representing the Blues, he represented Manly Warringah District Cricket Club in Sydney Grade Cricket. He attended St Augustine's College.

He first rose to fame filling in as substitute fielder during the fifth day of the third test between Australia and Pakistan at the Sydney Cricket Ground in January 2017. Due to his 198 cm tall figure and long blond hair, the crowd immediately embraced him as a new cult hero and began to cheer every time he fielded the ball. Edwards immediately became a popular hit on social media for his cameo.

== Domestic career ==
Edwards was offered a rookie contract by New South Wales in 2015. However, he was unable to play during the 2015–16 season due to multiple stress fractures.

=== 2017–18 season ===
Edwards was offered a rookie contract for the 2017–18 domestic season by New South Wales and was included in the squad for the 2017–18 JLT One-Day Cup. Edwards made his List A cricket debut for New South Wales on 29 September 2017, playing against Western Australia in a 50-over match in Perth. He had a breakout performance in his second match against Tasmania, taking 4 wickets for 31 runs to give New South Wales a 102-run win. He played four matches for the tournament and took 5 wickets in total.

He made his Twenty20 debut for Sydney Sixers in the 2017–18 Big Bash League season on 3 January 2018.

With brother Jack making his debut against Western Australia in September 2018 the Edwards brothers became the first brothers to play for New South Wales since the Waugh twins in 2004.

=== 2023 season ===
In February 2023, Edwards joined Yorkshire on an 18-month contract, qualifying as a local player due to having a British passport.

=== 2024 season ===
A recurring foot injury restricted Edwards to four first-class appearances for Yorkshire and he announced his retirement from professional cricket in October 2024.
