= Josh Philippe =

Australian cricketer (born 1997)

Personal information
- Full name: Joshua Ryan Philippe
- Born: 1 June 1997 (age 29); Subiaco, Western Australia, Australia
- Batting: Right-handed
- Role: Wicket-keeper-batter

International information
- National side: Australia (2021–present)
- ODI debut (cap 233): 20 July 2021 v West Indies
- Last ODI: 19 October 2025 v India
- ODI shirt no.: 2
- T20I debut (cap 96): 22 February 2021 v New Zealand
- Last T20I: 1 February 2026 v Pakistan
- T20I shirt no.: 2

Domestic team information
- Years: Team
- 2017/18–2023/24: Western Australia (squad no. 27)
- 2017/18: Perth Scorchers (squad no. 27)
- 2018/19–present: Sydney Sixers (squad no. 22)
- 2020: Royal Challengers Bangalore (squad no. 1)
- 2024/25–present: New South Wales (squad no. 2)
- 2026: Multan Sultans (squad no. 22)
- 2026: Surrey

Career statistics
Competition	ODI	T20I	FC	LA
Matches	4	17	68	63
Runs scored	102	186	3,409	2,168
Batting average	25.50	12.40	30.71	35.54
100s/50s	0/0	0/0	5/23	3/15
Top score	39	45	129	139
Catches/stumpings	4/–	2/-	197/8	76/4
- Source: ESPNcricinfo, 25 October 2026

Joshua Ryan Philippe (born 1 June 1997) is an Australian cricketer who plays as a wicket-keeper batsman. He made his international debut for the Australia cricket team in February 2021. Born to a cricketing family, his father played for Western Australia 2nd XI and coached Western Fury while his mother represented Western Australia in the 1980s.

== Career ==
Philippe made his Twenty20 debut for Perth Scorchers against the Sydney Sixers in the 2017–18 Big Bash League season on 23 December 2017. Prior to his T20 debut, he scored 88 runs from 92 balls opening the batting against England in a warm-up match representing a Western Australia XI, prior to the 2017–18 Ashes series.

Philippe made his first-class debut for Western Australia in the 2017–18 Sheffield Shield season in February 2018 and his List A debut for the team in the 2018–19 JLT One-Day Cup in September 2018. He won the Player of the Match award when the Prime Minister's XI beat the touring South Africans on 31 October 2018; he was the match top-scorer with 57, and made four dismissals and conceded no byes in the South African innings.

In July 2020, Philippe was named in a 26-man preliminary squad of players to begin training ahead of a possible tour to England following the COVID-19 pandemic. In August, Cricket Australia confirmed that the fixtures would be taking place, with Philippe included in the touring party, although he did not play during the series.

After being bought by Royal Challengers Bangalore in 2020 IPL auction, Philippe played for them in the 2020 Indian Premier League, scoring 78 runs in five innings. He was retained for the 2021 season but withdrew from the tournament prior to its start for personal reasons.

In January 2021, Philippe was named in Australia's Twenty20 International (T20I) squad for their series against New Zealand. He made his T20I debut for Australia, against New Zealand, on 22 February 2021. In June 2021, Philippe was named in Australia's limited overs squad for their tours of the West Indies and Bangladesh. Philippe made his One Day International (ODI) debut on 20 July 2021, for Australia against the West Indies.

In September 2021, in the opening match of the 2021–22 Marsh One-Day Cup, Philippe scored his first century in List A cricket, with 137 runs against South Australia.
