= Max Bryant =

Australian cricketer

Personal information
- Full name: Max Arthur Bryant
- Born: 10 March 1999 (age 27); Murwillumbah, New South Wales, Australia
- Batting: Right-handed
- Bowling: Right-arm medium
- Role: Batter

Domestic team information
- Years: Team
- 2017/18: Cricket Australia XI (squad no. 15)
- 2018/19–2026/27: Queensland
- 2018/19–present: Brisbane Heat
- 2025: Peshawar Zalmi
- LA debut: 27 September 2017 Cricket Australia XI v South Australia

Career statistics
Competition	FC	LA	T20
Matches	9	45	86
Runs scored	377	1,165	1,788
Batting average	23.56	27.73	23.84
100s/50s	–/1	0/7	–/7
Top score	84	89	81
Catches/stumpings	8/–	25/–	34/–
- Source: ESPNcricinfo, 18 October 2026

Max Arthur Bryant (born 10 March 1999) is an Australian cricketer. He made his List A debut for Cricket Australia XI in the 2017–18 JLT One-Day Cup on 27 September 2017.

== Early life ==
Bryant was born in Murwillumbah and raised 15 km south of the Queensland-New South Wales border in Kingscliff. He grew up playing cricket and rugby league for Cudgen in the Gold Coast competition. Due to its close proximity and population difference, most sports teams based in the north-eastern Tweed region of New South Wales fall under the jurisdiction of neighbouring Gold Coast sporting administrations. State representation differs between sports and this was evidenced when Bryant played for New South Wales in rugby league and Queensland in cricket. At the age of seven, he moved to Townsville for three years before relocating to the Gold Coast. Upon return, Bryant began playing Queensland Premier Cricket for the Gold Coast Dolphins where he made his first grade debut at the age of 16 in December 2015. and attended St Joseph's College throughout his teenage years. He continued to play rugby league as a teenager and was offered a three-year developmental contract with the Gold Coast Titans but gave the sport away at the age of 17 to focus on cricket.

== Domestic career ==
Bryant was in the Cricket Australia XI squad for the 2017–18 JLT One-Day Cup. He made his List A debut in Cricket Australia XI's victory over South Australia, but he only scored one run and did not bowl. He played again in their second match, top-scoring for the side with 60 runs against Queensland in a losing effort. He registered his highest score for the tournament against New South Wales, reaching 89 runs off just 61 balls, also in a loss. His form was good enough that he did not miss a match for Cricket Australia XI and finished the tournament with a total of 168 runs with a strike rate over 100.

He made his Twenty20 debut for Brisbane Heat in the 2018–19 Big Bash League season on 19 December 2018. He made his first-class debut on 24 February 2020, for Queensland in the 2019–20 Sheffield Shield season. In 2024 he won his first ever Big Bash League title in 2023-24 season where he scored 29 off 19 balls.

Bryant fell out of favour with Queensland in the 2025-26 season, playing only one List A match for the season, and lost his state contract at the end of the season.

== International career ==
In December 2017, he was named in Australia's squad for the 2018 Under-19 Cricket World Cup.
