= Seb Gotch =

Australian cricketer (born 1993)

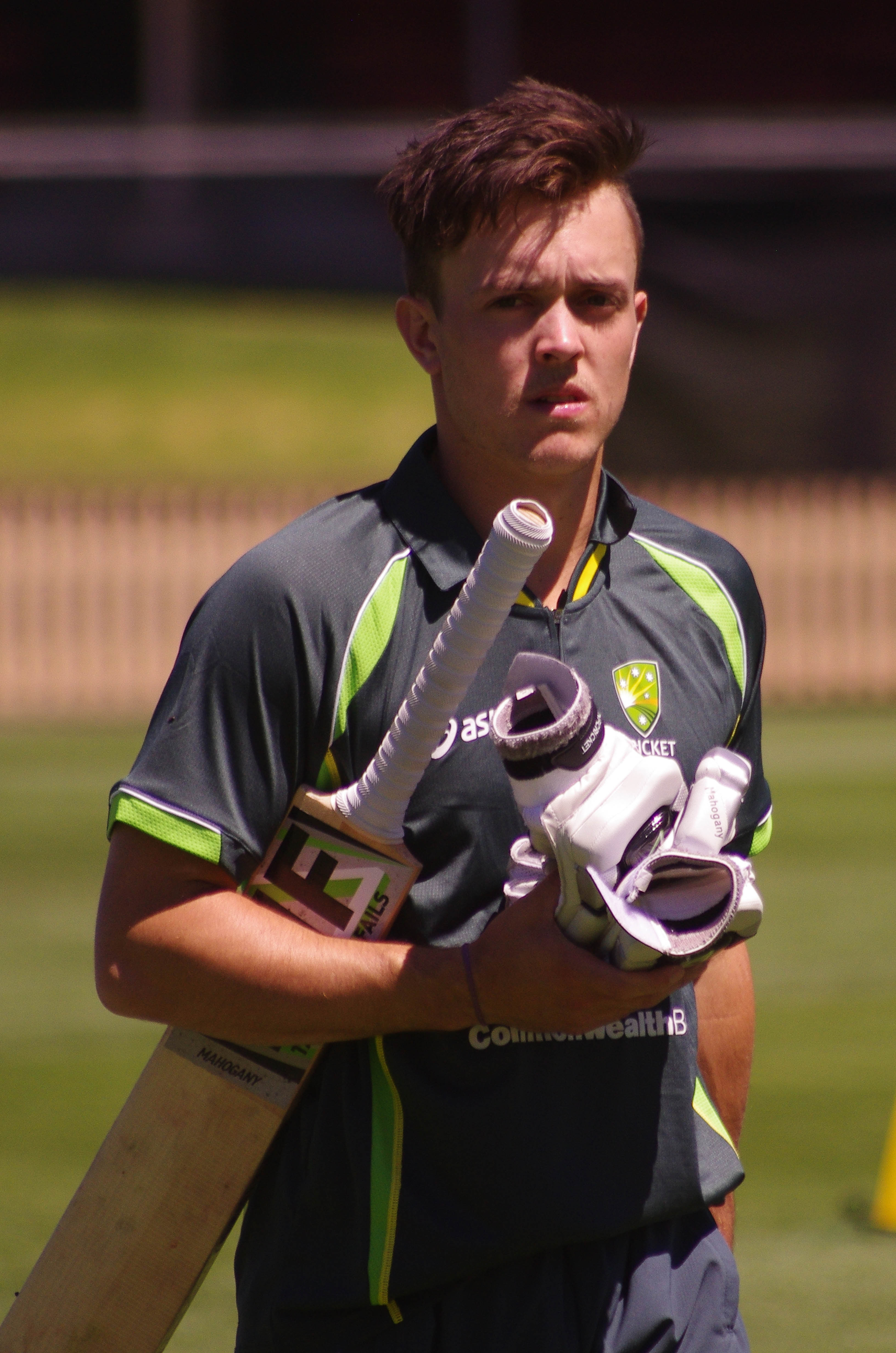
- Gotch in 2014

Personal information
- Full name: Sebastian Edward Gotch
- Born: 12 July 1993 (age 33); Hughesdale, Victoria, Victoria, Australia
- Batting: Right-handed
- Role: Wicket-keeper

Domestic team information
- Years: Team
- 2016/17–2020/21: Melbourne Stars
- 2016/17–2020/21: Victoria

Career statistics
Competition	FC	LA	T20
Matches	29	17	37
Runs scored	1,187	347	417
Batting average	33.91	24.78	17.37
100s/50s	2/6	0/2	0/0
Top score	102*	61	48
Catches/stumpings	100/8	13/1	19/8
- Source: Cricinfo, 12 May 2022

Sebastian Edward Gotch (born 12 July 1993) is an Australian former cricketer who played as a wicket-keeper batsman. He made his List A debut for Cricket Australia XI on 5 October 2015 in the 2015–16 Matador BBQs One-Day Cup and his debut in the 2016–17 Big Bash League season for the Melbourne Stars in January 2017. He made his first-class debut for Victoria in the 2016–17 Sheffield Shield season on 25 February 2017. Gotch continued to play for the Melbourne Stars in BBL 08, 09, and 10 with mixed results, averaging 20, 9, and 13 respectively. In the 2019–2020 season playing for Victoria in the Sheffield Shield, Gotch scored back to back centuries. Seb Gotch plays Premier Cricket for the Melbourne Cricket Club where he has scored 5 centuries and 18 half centuries in the men's premier firsts.

He is the son of former Australian rules footballer and coach Brad Gotch and played football for the Oakleigh Chargers in the TAC Cup.

In May 2022, Gotch was forced to retire from cricket, due to a chronic finger injury.
