= Clive Rose (cricketer) =

Australian cricketer (born 1989)

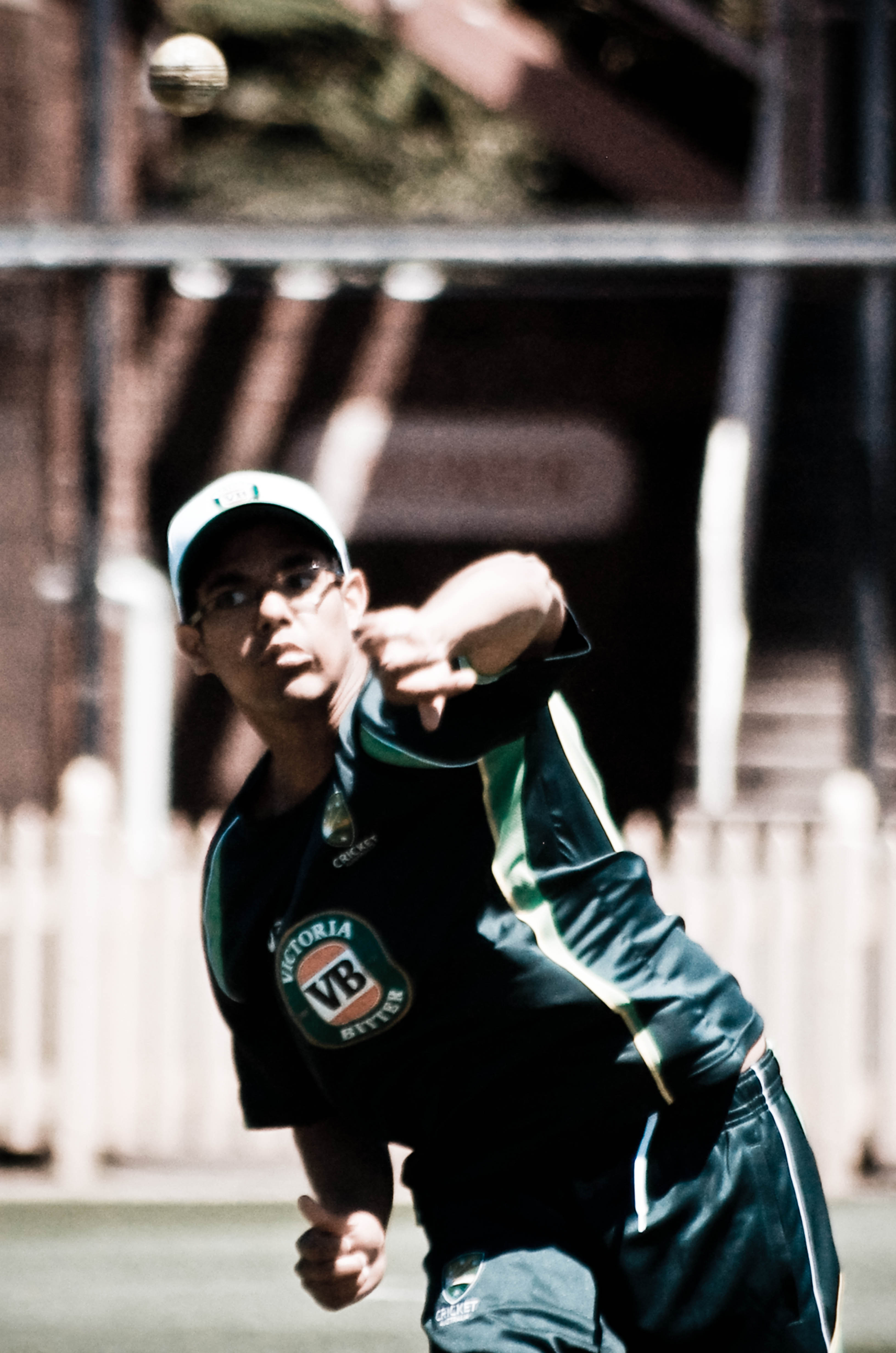

Personal information
- Full name: Clive Andrew Rose
- Born: 13 October 1989 (age 37)
- Batting: Right-handed
- Bowling: Slow left-arm Orthodox
- Role: Bowler

Domestic team information
- Years: Team
- 2012-2013: Victoria
- 2013-2016: Tasmania
- 2012-2014: Melbourne Stars
- 2015-2020: Hobart Hurricanes
- 2018–present: Tasmania

Career statistics
Competition	FC	LA	T20
Matches	10	27	58
Runs scored	240	253	183
Batting average	17.14	16.86	15.25
100s/50s	0/0	0/0	0/0
Top score	45	35	32*
Balls bowled	1823	1217	965
Wickets	22	22	28
Bowling average	49.00	45.36	48.32
5 wickets in innings	0	0	0
10 wickets in match	0	0	0
Best bowling	4/64	4/42	2/14
Catches/stumpings	6/–	8/–	17/–
- Source: Cricinfo, 22 March 2021

Clive Andrew Rose (born 13 October 1989) is an Australian cricketer who played for Victoria and Tasmania. Rose is a left-arm orthodox spinner. He is of Pakistani heritage.

In October 2013, Rose hit 26 off 9 deliveries to give Tasmania a dramatic final-over win over Queensland in the Ryobi Cup. He also played for the Hobart Hurricanes in the Big Bash League.

Rose has also represented Victoria in Indoor cricket.
