= List of Big Bash League records and statistics =

The Big Bash League (BBL), also known as the KFC Big Bash League for sponsorship reasons, is an Australian professional Twenty20 cricket league which was established in 2011 by Cricket Australia. Records listed here are counted from the inaugural season onwards and do not include the league's predecessor, the KFC Twenty20 Big Bash. Players who competed in the 2025–26 Big Bash League season are highlighted in bold.

== Listing notation ==
=== Team notation ===
- "2/200" indicates that a team scored 200 runs for two wickets and the innings was closed, either due to a successful run chase or if no playing time remained.
- "200" indicates that a team scored 200 runs and was all out.

=== Batting notation ===
- "100" indicates that a batter scored 100 runs and was out.
- "100*" indicates that a batter scored 100 runs and was not out.

=== Bowling notation ===
- "5/20 (4.0)" indicates that a bowler has captured 5 wickets while conceding 20 runs from 4 overs.

== Results summary ==
Team	Mat	Won	Lost	Tied (W)	NR	Win %	Titles
Adelaide Strikers	167	80	84	0	3	48.78	1
Brisbane Heat	167	76	88	1 (0)	2	46.06	2
Hobart Hurricanes	168	84	81	0	3	50.90	1
Melbourne Renegades	161	64	95	0	2	40.25	1
Melbourne Stars	171	82	87	1 (1)	1	48.82	0
Perth Scorchers	179	109	67	1 (1)	2	62.14	6
Sydney Sixers	179	102	67	4 (2)	6	60.11	3
Sydney Thunder	166	66	94	1 (0)	5	40.99	1
As of Sydney Sixers v Perth Scorchers at Perth, Final, BBL|15

Notes

- Win percentage is the percentage of completed matches won (i.e. % of wins vs % of losses).
- Total matches do not include matches played outside of the Big Bash League (e.g. the Champions League Twenty20).

== Team records ==
=== Highest totals ===
Score (overs)	Team	Opposition	Result	Season
**2/273 (20.0 overs)**	Melbourne Stars	Hobart Hurricanes	Won	2021–22
**2/258 (19.5 overs)**	Brisbane Heat	Perth Scorchers	Won	2025–26
**6/257 (20.0 overs)**	Perth Scorchers	Brisbane Heat	Lost	2025–26
**5/251 (20.0 overs)**	Adelaide Strikers	Brisbane Heat	Won	2024–25
**4/232 (20.0 overs)**	Perth Scorchers	Adelaide Strikers	Won	2025–26

=== Lowest totals ===
Score (overs)	Team	Opposition	Season
**15 (5.5 overs)**	Sydney Thunder	Adelaide Strikers	2022–23
**57 (12.4 overs)**	Melbourne Renegades	Melbourne Stars	2014–15
**60 (10.4 overs)**	Melbourne Renegades	Sydney Sixers	2020–21
**61 (11.1 overs)**	Melbourne Stars	Sydney Sixers	2021–22
**62 (14.4 overs)**	Sydney Thunder	Sydney Sixers	2022–23

=== Highest successful run chases ===
Score (overs)	Team	Opposition	Season
**2/258 (19.5 overs)**	Brisbane Heat	Perth Scorchers	2025–26
**3/230 (19.3 overs)**	Adelaide Strikers	Hobart Hurricanes	2022–23
**8/223 (20 overs)**	Hobart Hurricanes	Melbourne Renegades	2016–17
**3/211 (19 overs)**	Melbourne Stars	Adelaide Strikers	2023–24
**7/210 (19.2 overs)**	Hobart Hurricanes	Brisbane Heat	2013–14

=== List of tied matches ===
In the instance a match is tied, teams play a super over to determine the winner of the match. If the teams tie during the super over, they play another until a winner is decided.

No.	Batting first	Batting second	Venue	Result	Season	Ref(s)
1	Perth Scorchers	Sydney Sixers	Sydney Cricket Ground	Match tied Scorchers won (0/4 – 2/1)	2013–14	
2	Sydney Sixers	Melbourne Stars	Melbourne Cricket Ground	Match tied Stars won (0/19 – 2/9)	2014–15	
3	Brisbane Heat	Sydney Sixers	The Gabba	Match tied Sixers won (0/22 – 0/15)	2016–17	
4	Sydney Thunder	Sydney Sixers	Sydney Cricket Ground	Match tied Sixers won (2/16 – 0/15)	2019–20	

=== Other team records ===
- Lowest successful run defence: (Note: Does not include shortened matches.) Perth Scorchers — 7/117 (20 overs) vs Melbourne Renegades, 26 December 2013
- Largest winning margin:
  - Batting first: Sydney Sixers – 152 runs vs Melbourne Stars, 5 December 2021
  - Fielding first: Melbourne Stars – 75 balls remaining vs Adelaide Strikers, 9 January 2014

== Batting records ==
=== Most runs ===
Batter	Inns	Runs	Span
**Chris Lynn** (Heat, Strikers)	135	**4,133**	2011–2026
**Moises Henriques** (Sixers)	145	**3,324**	2011–2026
**Glenn Maxwell** (Renegades, Stars)	121	**3,317**	2011–2026
Aaron Finch (Renegades)	105	**3,311**	2011–2024
**Marcus Stoinis** (Scorchers, Stars)	116	**3,250**	2012–2026

=== Highest batting average ===
Batter	Inns	Average	Runs	Span
**David Warner** (Thunder)	31	**49.52**	1,139	2011–2026
**Steve Smith** (Sixers)	39	**48.32**	1,498	2011–2026
Brad Hodge (Strikers, Renegades, Stars)	45	**42.78**	1,412	2011–2018
Shaun Marsh (Scorchers, Renegades)	79	**40.72**	2,810	2011–2024
**Liam Scott** (Strikers)	18	**37.27**	410	2020–2026
Minimum innings played – 10

=== Highest individual score ===
Batter	Runs	Balls	Opposition	Season
**Glenn Maxwell** (Stars)	**154***	64	Hobart Hurricanes	2021–22
**Marcus Stoinis** (Stars)	**147***	79	Sydney Sixers	2019–20
Josh Brown (Heat)	**140**	57	Adelaide Strikers	2023–24
**Matthew Wade** (Hurricanes)	**130***	61	Adelaide Strikers	2019–20
**David Warner** (Thunder)	**130***	65	Hobart Hurricanes	2025–26

=== Most sixes ===
Batter	6s	Span
**Chris Lynn** (Heat, Strikers)	**227**	2011–2026
**Glenn Maxwell** (Renegades, Stars)	**153**	2011–2026
**Ben McDermott** (Heat, Renegades, Hurricanes)	**146**	2014–2026
Aaron Finch (Renegades)	**118**	2011–2024
**Marcus Stoinis** (Scorchers, Stars)	**117**	2012–2026

=== Highest strike rate ===
Batter	SR	Span
**Laurie Evans** (Renegades, Scorchers)	**156.82**	2021–2026
**Tim David** (Scorchers, Hurricanes)	**155.79**	2018–2025
**Glenn Maxwell** (Renegades, Stars)	**154.35**	2011–2026
**Steve Smith** (Sixers)	**150.85**	2011–2026
**Josh Brown** (Heat, Renegades)	**150.67**	2022–2026
Minimum balls faced – 500

=== Most ducks ===
Batter	Ducks	Inns	Span
**Sam Harper** (Renegades, Stars)	11	97	2016–2025
Nathan Coulter-Nile (Scorchers, Stars)	10	48	2011–2024
**Ben Dwarshuis** (Sixers)	10	70	2014–2026
Alex Hales (Strikers, Hurricanes, Renegades, Thunder)	10	78	2013–2024
**Daniel Sams** (Sixers, Thunder)	10	84	2017–2026
Dan Christian (Hurricanes, Heat, Renegades, Sixers, Thunder)	10	127	2011–2025

=== Other batting records ===
- Most scores 50 (or over): Chris Lynn (Heat, Strikers) — 33
- Most runs in a season: Marcus Stoinis (Stars) — 705 (2019–20)
- Fastest fifty: Chris Gayle (Renegades) — 12 balls faced (2015–16)
- Fastest century: Craig Simmons (Scorchers) / Mitchell Owen (Hurricanes) — 39 balls faced (2013–14 / 2024–25)
- Most sixes in an innings: Josh Brown (Heat) — 12 (2023–24)
- Most runs in an over: Steve Smith (Sydney Sixers) — 32 (2025–26)

== Bowling records ==
=== Most wickets ===
Bowler	Inn	Wkts	Span
**Sean Abbott** (Thunder, Sixers)	132	**186**	2011–2026
**Ben Dwarshuis** (Sixers)	126	**164**	2014–2026
**Andrew Tye** (Thunder, Scorchers, Renegades)	117	**162**	2014–2026
**Jason Behrendorff** (Scorchers, Renegades)	113	**145**	2012–2026
**Kane Richardson** (Strikers, Renegades, Sixers)	115	**142**	2011–2025

=== List of hat-tricks ===
No.	Bowler	Team	Opposition	Dismissals	Season	Ref(s)
1	Xavier Doherty	Hobart Hurricanes	Sydney Thunder	Simon Keen (c); Ryan Carters (st); Cameron Borgas (lbw)	2012–13	
2	Andrew Tye	Perth Scorchers	Brisbane Heat	Jack Wildermuth (c); Mitchell Swepson (c); Mark Steketee (b)	2016–17	
3	Andrew Tye	Perth Scorchers	Sydney Sixers	Sean Abbott (c); Steve O'Keefe (c); Daniel Sams (lbw)	2017–18	
4	Josh Lalor	Brisbane Heat	Perth Scorchers	Andrew Tye (c); Matthew Kelly (c); Nick Hobson (c)	2018–19	
5	Rashid Khan	Adelaide Strikers	Sydney Sixers	James Vince (c); Jack Edwards (lbw); Jordan Silk (b)	2019–20	
6	Haris Rauf	Melbourne Stars	Sydney Thunder	Matthew Gilkes (c); Callum Ferguson (b); Daniel Sams (lbw)	2019–20	
7	Gurinder Sandhu	Sydney Thunder	Perth Scorchers	Colin Munro (c); Aaron Hardie (c); Laurie Evans (c)	2021–22	
8	Cameron Boyce	Melbourne Renegades	Sydney Thunder	Alex Hales (c); Jason Sangha (st); Alex Ross (lbw); Daniel Sams (lbw)	2021–22	
9	Michael Neser	Brisbane Heat	Melbourne Renegades	Jake Fraser-McGurk (c); Nic Maddinson (b); Jonathan Wells (b)	2022–23	
10	Nathan Ellis	Hobart Hurricanes	Sydney Thunder	Matthew Gilkes (lbw); Oliver Davies (c); Nathan McAndrew (b)	2022–23	

Last updated: 31 December 2025

=== Best economy rates ===
Bowler	Overs	Econ	Span
Lasith Malinga (Stars)	50.0	**5.40**	2012–2014
Muttiah Muralitharan (Renegades)	61.0	**5.70**	2012–2014
Usman Shinwari (Renegades)	28.0	**6.14**	2018–2019
Mitchell Johnson (Scorchers)	74.0	**6.14**	2016–2018
Mujeeb Ur Rahman (Heat, Renegades)	201.2	**6.41**	2018–2023
Minimum overs bowled – 25.0

=== Other bowling records ===
- Most wickets in a season: Daniel Sams (Thunder) / Peter Siddle (Strikers) — 30 (2019–20 / 2020–21)
- Most runs conceded in an innings: Liam Guthrie (Heat) — 70 (2021–22)
- Best bowling figures in an innings: Lasith Malinga (Stars) — 6/7 (4.0) vs Perth Scorchers, 12 December 2012
- Best bowling figures on debut: Daniel Sams (Sixers) – 4/14 (4.0) vs Sydney Thunder, 19 December 2017

== Fielding records ==
=== Most dismissals (wicket-keeper) ===
Wicket-keeper	Inns	Dis	Ct	St	Span
**Josh Philippe** (Scorchers, Sixers)	110	**110**	95	15	2017–2026
**Josh Inglis** (Scorchers)	79	**90**	72	17	2017–2026
**Jimmy Peirson** (Heat)	122	**90**	73	17	2014–2026
**Sam Harper** (Renegades, Stars)	97	**79**	67	12	2016–2026
**Matthew Wade** (Renegades, Stars, Hurricanes)	103	**70**	61	9	2011–2026

=== Most catches (fielder) ===
Fielder	Inns	Ct	Span
**Glenn Maxwell** (Renegades, Stars)	129	97	2011–2026
**Jordan Silk** (Sixers)	139	88	2013–2026
**Sean Abbott** (Thunder, Sixers)	132	75	2011–2026
**Moises Henriques** (Sixers)	151	72	2011–2026
**Chris Green** (Thunder)	119	69	2015–2026
Dan Christian (Hurricanes, Heat, Renegades, Sixers, Thunder)	138	69	2011–2025

Notes

- Does not include catches taken as a substitute fielder

=== Other fielding records ===
- Most dismissals in a season: Josh Inglis (Scorchers) — 18 (2022–23)
- Most catches in a season: Jordan Silk (Sixers) — 18 (2022–23)

== Partnership records ==
=== Highest partnership by wicket ===
Wicket	Runs	First batter	Second batter	Team	Opposition	Venue	Date
1st wicket	207	Marcus Stoinis	Hilton Cartwright	Stars	Sixers	Melbourne Cricket Ground, Melbourne	12 January 2020
2nd wicket	212	Jack Wildermuth	Matt Renshaw	Heat	Scorchers	The Gabba, Brisbane	19 December 2025
3rd wicket	164	Mitchell Marsh	Aaron Hardie	Scorchers	Hurricanes	Bellerive Oval, Hobart	1 January 2026
4th wicket	151	Joe Clarke	Hilton Cartwright	Stars	Heat	The Gabba, Brisbane	27 December 2021
5th wicket	137*	Cameron Bancroft	Hilton Cartwright	Scorchers	Thunder	Sydney Cricket Ground, Sydney	11 January 2018
6th wicket	94*	Mohammad Nabi	Dan Christian	Renegades	Strikers	Adelaide Oval, Adelaide	23 December 2018
7th wicket	88	Tom Curran	Sean Abbott	Sixers	Thunder	Sydney Cricket Ground, Sydney	24 December 2018
8th wicket	81	Glenn Maxwell	Usama Mir	Stars	Renegades	Docklands Stadium, Melbourne	12 January 2025
9th wicket	84*	Brendan Doggett	Cameron Boyce	Strikers	Scorchers	Adelaide Oval, Adelaide	31 December 2024
10th wicket	61*	Daniel Worrall	Danny Briggs	Strikers	Hurricanes	Bellerive Oval, Hobart	13 December 2020

=== Highest partnership by runs ===
Runs	First batsmen	Second batsmen	Team	Opposition	Wicket	Venue	Date
212	Jack Wildermuth	Matt Renshaw	Heat	Scorchers	2nd wicket	The Gabba, Brisbane	19 December 2025
207	Marcus Stoinis	Hilton Cartwright	Stars	Sixers	1st wicket	Melbourne Cricket Ground, Melbourne	12 January 2020
203	Matthew Wade	D'Arcy Short	Hurricanes	Strikers	1st wicket	Adelaide Oval, Adelaide	26 January 2020
172	Rob Quiney	Luke Wright	Stars	Hurricanes	1st wicket	Bellerive Oval, Hobart	9 January 2012
171*	Shaun Marsh	Michael Klinger	Scorchers	Renegades	1st wicket	Docklands Stadium, Melbourne	30 December 2015

== Individual records (others) ==
=== Most matches ===
Player	Mat	Span
**Moises Henriques** (Sixers)	154	2011–2026
**Jordan Silk** (Sixers)	141	2013–2026
**Ashton Turner** (Scorchers)	141	2013–2026
Dan Christian (Hurricanes, Heat, Renegades, Sixers, Thunder)	140	2011–2025
**Chris Lynn** (Heat, Strikers)	137	2011–2026
Jonathan Wells (Hurricanes, Strikers, Renegades)	137	2011–2025

=== Most matches as captain ===
Player	Team(s)	Mat	Span
**Moises Henriques** †	Sydney Sixers	**129**	2013–2026
**Ashton Turner** †	Perth Scorchers	**82**	2013–2026
Aaron Finch	Melbourne Renegades	**79**	2012–2023
**Glenn Maxwell**	Melbourne Stars	**65**	2018–2024
**Matthew Wade**	Hobart Hurricanes	**52**	2018–2023

† Denotes players who are the captain of their team currently

=== Player of the final ===
Season	Player	Team	Score (balls)	BF	Catches	Ref
2011–12	Moises Henriques	Sydney Sixers	70 (41)	—		
2012–13	Nathan Hauritz	Brisbane Heat	—	0/11	3	
2013–14	Brad Hogg	Perth Scorchers	—	2/17	—	
2014–15	Shaun Marsh	Perth Scorchers	73 (59)	—		
2015–16	Usman Khawaja	Sydney Thunder	70 (40)	—		
2016–17	Jhye Richardson	Perth Scorchers	—	3/30	—	
2017–18	Jake Weatherald	Adelaide Strikers	115 (70)	—		
2018–19	Dan Christian	Melbourne Renegades	38* (30)	2/33	2	
2019–20	Josh Philippe	Sydney Sixers	52 (29)	—		
2020–21	James Vince	Sydney Sixers	95 (60)	—	2	
2021–22	Laurie Evans	Perth Scorchers	76* (41)	—		
2022–23	Ashton Turner	Perth Scorchers	53 (32)	—		
2023–24	Spencer Johnson	Brisbane Heat	—	4/26	1	
2024–25	Mitchell Owen	Hobart Hurricanes	108 (42)	—		
2025–26	David Payne	Perth Scorchers	—	3/18	1	

== See also ==
- List of Women's Big Bash League records and statistics
- List of Big Bash League centuries
- List of Big Bash League five-wicket hauls
