= List of Big Bash League five-wicket hauls =

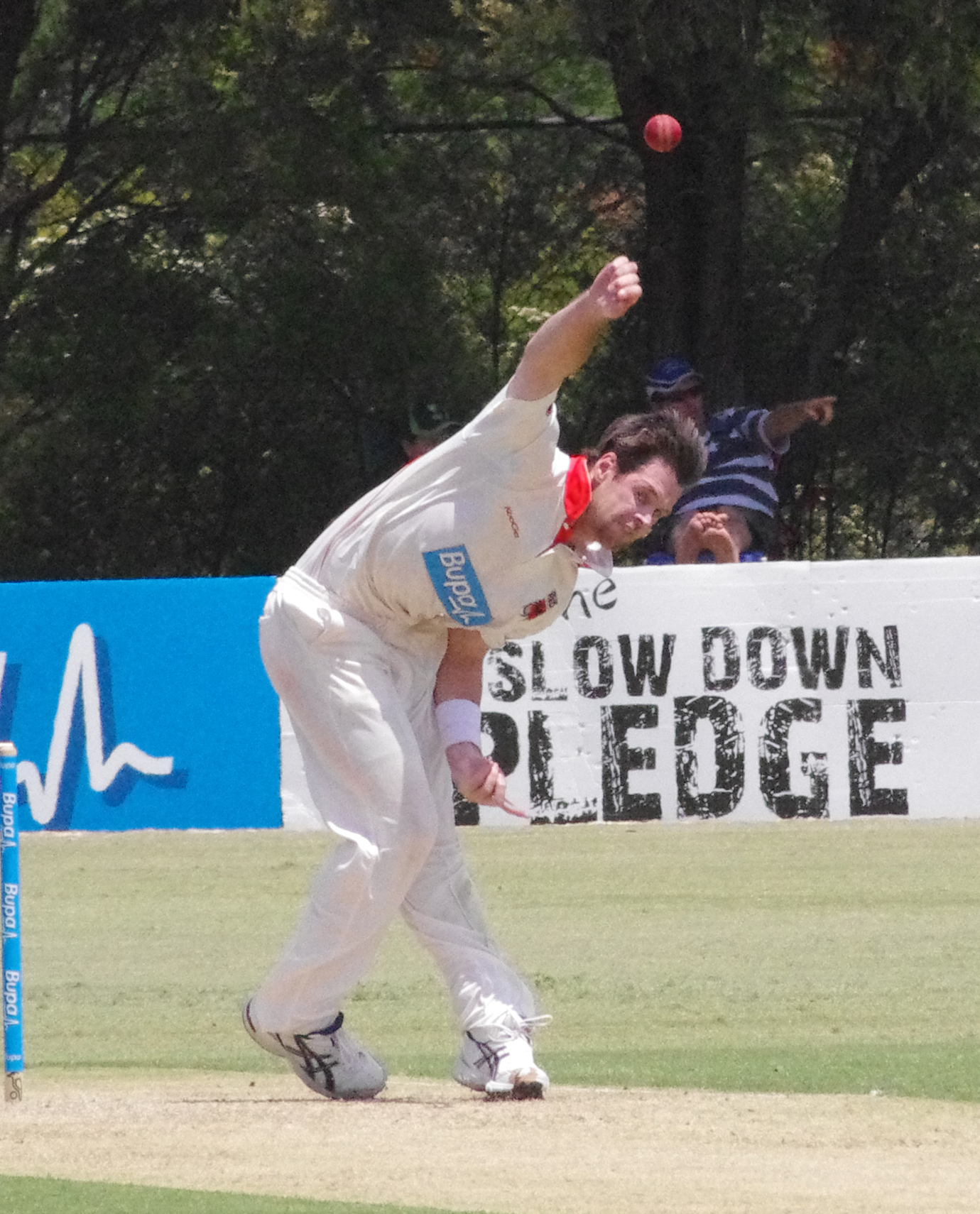
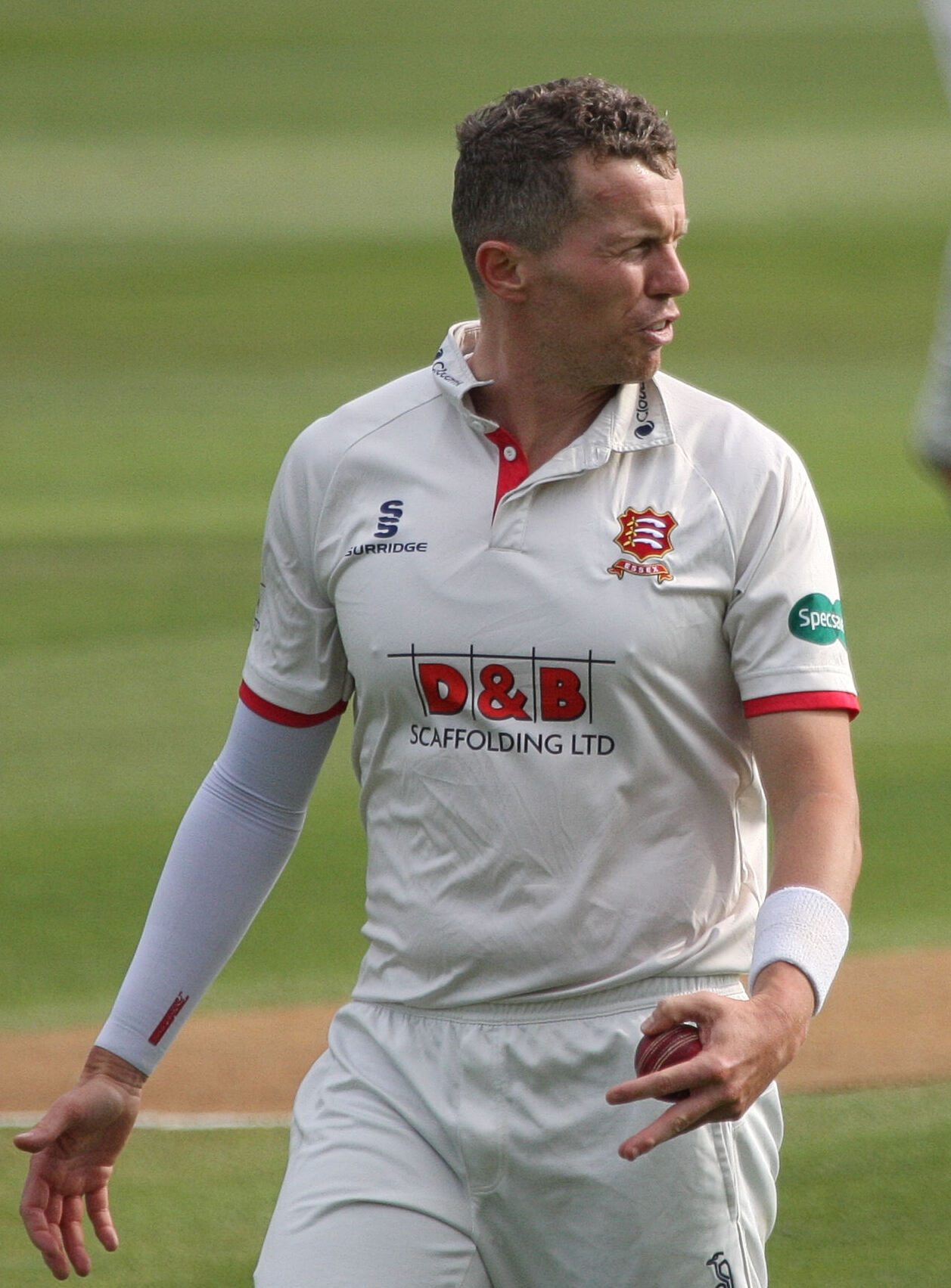
Dan Christian (left), Peter Siddle (right) and Ben Dwarshuis (not pictured) are the only players to have taken multiple five-wicket hauls.

In cricket, a five-wicket haul (also known as a "five-for" or "fifer") refers to a bowler taking five or more wickets in a single innings. This is regarded as a notable achievement. The Big Bash League (BBL) is a professional Twenty20 cricket league in Australia, which has been held annually since its first season in 2011–12. In the fifteen seasons played, 31 five-wicket hauls have been taken by twenty eight different bowlers. Players from all eight teams have taken five-wicket hauls.

The first five-wicket haul was taken by Lasith Malinga of the Melbourne Stars against the Perth Scorchers on 12 December 2012. Of the 31 five-wicket hauls, only 8 have been scored by non-Australian bowlers. Three players have achieved multiple five-wicket hauls, with Dan Christian, Peter Siddle and Ben Dwarshuis each earning two over their BBL careers.

The list includes all the five-wicket hauls taken in the BBL, listed in chronological order and does not include matches played by the BBL teams in other tournaments, such as the Champions League Twenty20.

== Key ==
Key
Symbol	Meaning
Date	Day on which the match was held
Inn	Innings in which the five-wicket haul was taken
Overs	Number of overs bowled
Runs	Number of runs conceded
Wkts	Number of wickets taken
Econ	Runs conceded per over
Batsmen	Batsmen whose wickets were taken
Result	Result from the perspective of the bowler's team

== Five-wicket hauls ==
Big Bash League five-wicket hauls
No.	Bowler	Ground	Team	Opposition	Date	Inn	Overs	Runs	Wkts	Econ	Batsmen	Result
1	Lasith Malinga	WACA Ground, Perth	Melbourne Stars	Perth Scorchers	12 December 2012	1	4	7	6	1.75	Marcus North; Marcus Stoinis; Hilton Cartwright; Nathan Coulter-Nile; Tom Triffitt; Joe Mennie	Won
2	Dan Christian (1/2)	Stadium Australia, Sydney	Brisbane Heat	Sydney Thunder	28 December 2012	1	4	26	5	6.50	Chris Gayle; Matt Prior; Simon Keen; Chris Tremain; Scott Coyte	Won
3	Nathan Lyon	Sydney Cricket Ground, Sydney	Sydney Sixers	Hobart Hurricanes	20 December 2015	2	3.5	23	5	6.00	Tim Paine; Kumar Sangakkara; Joe Mennie; Sam Rainbird; Shaun Tait	Won
4	Samuel Badree	Melbourne Cricket Ground, Melbourne	Brisbane Heat	Melbourne Stars	14 January 2016	2	4	22	5	5.50	Luke Wright; Kevin Pietersen; Marcus Stoinis; Peter Handscomb; Rob Quiney	Won
5	Sean Abbott	Adelaide Oval, Adelaide	Sydney Sixers	Adelaide Strikers	31 December 2016	1	4	16	5	4.00	Brad Hodge; Ben Dunk; Travis Head; Chris Jordan; Tom Andrews	Lost
6	Dan Christian (2/2)	Bellerive Oval, Hobart	Hobart Hurricanes	Adelaide Strikers	2 January 2017	1	4	14	5	3.50	Jono Dean; Travis Head; Brad Hodge; Ben Laughlin; Liam O'Connor	Won
7	Ish Sodhi	Sydney Showground Stadium, Sydney	Adelaide Strikers	Sydney Thunder	18 January 2017	2	3.3	11	6	3.14	Carlos Brathwaite; Ben Rohrer; Jay Lenton; Arjun Nair; Chris Green; Clint McKay	Won
8	Dwayne Bravo	Bellerive Oval, Hobart	Melbourne Renegades	Hobart Hurricanes	21 December 2017	1	4	28	5	7.00	Alex Doolan; Ben McDermott; Jofra Archer; Cameron Boyce; Matthew Wade	Won
9	Andrew Tye	WACA Ground, Perth	Perth Scorchers	Melbourne Stars	26 December 2017	2	4	23	5	5.75	Peter Handscomb; Luke Wright; Marcus Stoinis; John Hastings; Adam Zampa	Won
10	Brendan Doggett	The Gabba, Brisbane	Brisbane Heat	Perth Scorchers	5 January 2018	2	4	35	5	8.75	Ashton Turner; Josh Inglis; Tim David; Andrew Tye; Joel Paris	Won
11	Josh Lalor	Sydney Cricket Ground, Sydney	Brisbane Heat	Sydney Sixers	20 January 2019	1	4	26	5	6.5	Josh Phillipe; Daniel Hughes; Jordan Silk; Tom Curran; Jack Edwards	Lost
12	Haris Rauf	Ted Summerton Reserve, Moe	Melbourne Stars	Hobart Hurricanes	22 December 2019	2	4	27	5	6.75	Ben McDermott; Mac Wright; Tom Rogers; Nathan Ellis; Qais Ahmad	Won
13	James Pattinson	The Gabba, Brisbane	Brisbane Heat	Adelaide Strikers	14 January 2020	1	4	33	5	8.25	Phil Salt; Travis Head; Jake Weatherald; Harry Nielsen; Jonathan Wells	Won
14	D'Arcy Short	Bellerive Oval, Hobart	Hobart Hurricanes	Sydney Thunder	24 January 2020	2	4	21	5	5.25	Alex Hales; Alex Ross; Chris Morris; Jay Lenton; Arjun Nair	Won
15	Peter Siddle (1/2)	York Park, Launceston	Adelaide Strikers	Hobart Hurricanes	15 December 2020	1	3.3	16	5	4.57	D'Arcy Short; Mac Wright; James Faulkner; Tim David; Riley Meredith	Won
16	Mujeeb Ur Rahman†	The Gabba, Brisbane	Brisbane Heat	Hobart Hurricanes	30 December 2020	1	4	15	5	3.75	Ben McDermott; Dawid Malan; Keemo Paul; Wil Parker; Scott Boland	Lost
17	Adam Zampa	Melbourne Cricket Ground, Melbourne	Melbourne Stars	Adelaide Strikers	15 January 2021	2	3.2	17	5	5.10	Matt Renshaw; Jake Weatherald; Daniel Worrall; Danny Briggs; Liam O'Connor	Won
18	Zak Evans	Melbourne Cricket Ground, Melbourne	Melbourne Renegades	Hobart Hurricanes	26 January 2021	2	4	33	5	8.25	Matthew Wade; D'Arcy Short; Will Jacks; Nathan Ellis; Riley Meredith	Won
19	Peter Siddle (2/2)	Adelaide Oval, Adelaide	Adelaide Strikers	Hobart Hurricanes	5 January 2022	1	3.5	23	5	6.00	Ben McDermott; Tim David; Mitchell Owen; Tom Rogers; Sandeep Lamichhane	Won
20	Ben Dwarshuis (1/2)	Kardinia Park, Geelong	Sydney Sixers	Melbourne Renegades	11 January 2022	2	4	26	5	6.50	Mackenzie Harvey; Will Sutherland; Sam Harper; Josh Lalor; Zahir Khan	Won
21	Rashid Khan	The Gabba, Brisbane	Adelaide Strikers	Brisbane Heat	12 January 2022	2	4	17	6	4.25	Sam Heazlett; Jake Lehmann; Will Prestwidge; Matthew Kuhnemann; Mujeeb Ur Rahman; Liam Guthrie	Won
22	Cameron Boyce	Melbourne Cricket Ground, Melbourne	Melbourne Renegades	Sydney Thunder	19 January 2022	1	4	21	5	5.25	Alex Hales; Jason Sangha; Alex Ross; Daniel Sams; Matthew Gilkes	Lost
23	Henry Thornton	Sydney Showground Stadium, Sydney	Adelaide Strikers	Sydney Thunder	16 December 2022	2	2.5	3	5	1.05	Rilee Rossouw; Jason Sangha; Alex Ross; Oliver Davies; Brendan Doggett	Won
24	Luke Wood	Junction Oval, Melbourne	Melbourne Stars	Perth Scorchers	23 December 2022	1	4	50	5	12.50	Faf du Plessis; Ashton Turner; Josh Inglis; Aaron Hardie; Jhye Richardson	Lost
25	Tom Rogers	Melbourne Cricket Ground, Melbourne	Melbourne Renegades	Melbourne Stars	3 January 2023	2	4	16	5	4.00	Joe Clarke; Beau Webster; Tom Rogers; Hilton Cartwright; Luke Wood	Won
26	Daniel Sams	The Gabba, Brisbane	Sydney Thunder	Brisbane Heat	27 December 2023	1	4	30	5	7.5	Josh Brown; Nathan McSweeney; Xavier Bartlett; Spencer Johnson; Mitchell Swepson	Lost
27	Lance Morris	Perth Stadium, Perth	Perth Scorchers	Adelaide Strikers	3 January 2024	2	4	24	5	6	Chris Lynn; Adam Hose; Matthew Short; Jamie Overton; James Bazley	Won
28	Ben Dwarshuis (2/2)	Carrara Stadium, Gold Coast	Sydney Sixers	Brisbane Heat	19 January 2024	2	3.5	21	5	5.5	Josh Brown; Matt Renshaw; Paul Walter; Michael Neser; Matthew Kuhnemann	Won
29	Mark Steketee	Docklands Stadium, Melbourne	Melbourne Stars	Melbourne Renegades	12 January 2025	2	4	17	5	4.25	Josh Brown; Marcus Harris; Jake Fraser-McGurk; Harry Dixon; Adam Zampa	Won
30	Nathan McAndrew	Sydney Showground Stadium, Sydney	Sydney Thunder	Melbourne Stars	22 January 2025	2	4	16	5	4.00	Sam Harper; Tom Rogers; Hilton Cartwright; Mark Steketee; Doug Warren	Won
31	Jack Edwards	Sydney Showground Stadium, Sydney	Sydney Sixers	Sydney Thunder	20 December 2025	2	4	26	5	6.50	Sam Konstas; David Warner; Sam Billings; Daniel Sams; Shadab Khan	Won

== See also ==
- List of Big Bash League records and statistics
- List of Big Bash League centuries
