= 2019–20 Big Bash League season =

Cricket tournament

2019–20 Big Bash League
- Dates: 17 December 2019 – 8 February 2020
- Administrator: Cricket Australia
- Cricket format: Twenty20
- Tournament format(s): Double round robin and Playoffs
- Champions: Sydney Sixers (2nd title)
- Participants: 8
- Matches: 61
- Attendance: 1,119,541 (18,353 per match)
- Player of the series: Marcus Stoinis (Melbourne Stars)
- Most runs: Marcus Stoinis (Melbourne Stars) (705)
- Most wickets: Daniel Sams (Sydney Thunder) (30)
- Official website: bigbash.com.au

The 2019–20 Big Bash League season or BBL|09 was the ninth season of the Big Bash League, the professional men's Twenty20 domestic cricket competition in Australia. The tournament started on 17 December 2019 and concluded on 8 February 2020.

The length of the season was shortened from the previous season, although the number of matches was increased from 59 to 61. The post-season stage of the tournament was revamped into a play-off system, with the top two teams in the league getting a second chance to advance to the final even if they lost the first match in the play-offs.

Melbourne Renegades were the defending champions, but finished last in the group stage. In the final, Sydney Sixers beat Melbourne Stars by 19 runs.

== Teams ==
Team	Home Ground	Capacity	Captain	Coach
Adelaide Strikers	Adelaide Oval	53,583	Travis Head	Jason Gillespie
Brisbane Heat	The Gabba; Carrara Stadium	42,000; 25,000	Chris Lynn	Darren Lehmann
Hobart Hurricanes	Bellerive Oval; York Park; Traeger Park	19,500; 15,500; 7,200	Matthew Wade	Adam Griffith
Melbourne Renegades	Docklands Stadium; Kardinia Park	48,003; 34,000	Aaron Finch	Michael Klinger
Melbourne Stars	Melbourne Cricket Ground; Carrara Stadium; Ted Summerton Reserve	100,024; 25,000; 7,500	Glenn Maxwell	David Hussey
Perth Scorchers	Perth Stadium	60,000	Mitchell Marsh	Adam Voges
Sydney Sixers	Sydney Cricket Ground; Coffs Harbour International Stadium	48,000; 20,000	Moises Henriques	Greg Shipperd
Sydney Thunder	Sydney Showground Stadium; Manuka Oval	22,000; 16,000	Callum Ferguson	Shane Bond

== Venues ==
Adelaide	Alice Springs	Brisbane	Canberra	Coffs Harbour
Adelaide Oval	Traeger Park	The Gabba	Manuka Oval	Coffs Harbour International Stadium
Capacity: 53,583	Capacity: 7,200	Capacity: 42,000	Capacity: 14,000	Capacity: 20,000
Matches: 7	Matches: 1	Matches: 5	Matches: 2	Matches: 1
Geelong	2019–20 Big Bash League season is located in Australia			Gold Coast
Kardinia Park	2019–20 Big Bash League season is located in Australia			Carrara Stadium
Capacity: 34,000	2019–20 Big Bash League season is located in Australia			Capacity: 25,000
Matches: 2	2019–20 Big Bash League season is located in Australia			Matches: 3
Hobart	2019–20 Big Bash League season is located in Australia			Launceston
Bellerive Oval	2019–20 Big Bash League season is located in Australia			York Park
Capacity: 19,500	2019–20 Big Bash League season is located in Australia			Capacity: 15,500
Matches: 4	2019–20 Big Bash League season is located in Australia			Matches: 2
	2019–20 Big Bash League season is located in Australia			A small stand to the left and a two tier stand and scoreboard filled with people in the backdrop of an oval grass playing surface scattered with players. Spectators stand in the foreground.
Perth	Melbourne		Sydney	
Perth Stadium	Docklands Stadium	Melbourne Cricket Ground	Sydney Showground Stadium	Sydney Cricket Ground
Capacity: 60,000	Capacity: 54,003	Capacity: 100,024	Capacity: 22,000	Capacity: 48,000
Matches: 7	Matches: 5	Matches: 5	Matches: 5	Matches: 6

== League stage ==
=== Points table ===
Pos	Team	Pld	W	L	NR	Pts	NRR	Qualification
1	Melbourne Stars	14	10	4	0	20	0.526	Advanced to play-off phase
2	Sydney Sixers (C)	14	9	4	1	19	0.269	Advanced to play-off phase
3	Adelaide Strikers	14	8	5	1	17	0.564	Advanced to play-off phase
4	Hobart Hurricanes	14	6	7	1	13	−0.355	Advanced to play-off phase
5	Sydney Thunder	14	6	7	1	13	−0.446	Advanced to play-off phase
6	Perth Scorchers	14	6	8	0	12	−0.023	
7	Brisbane Heat	14	6	8	0	12	−0.237	
8	Melbourne Renegades	14	3	11	0	6	−0.348	

(C) Champions

=== Matches ===
17 December 2019
19:10 (D/N)
Scorecard

Sydney Thunder; 6/172 (20 overs)	v	Brisbane Heat (H); 143 (19.2 overs)
Callum Ferguson 73* (44); Mitchell Swepson 2/11 (2 overs)		Ben Cutting 28 (18); Chris Green 2/19 (4 overs)

Sydney Thunder won by 29 runs
The Gabba, Brisbane
Attendance: 26,784
Umpires: Gerard Abood and Sam Nogajski
Player of the match: Callum Ferguson (Sydney Thunder)

- Sydney Thunder won the toss and elected to bat.

18 December 2019
19:10 (D/N)
Scorecard

Perth Scorchers; 131 (20 overs)	v	Sydney Sixers (H); 2/137 (15 overs)
Cameron Green 36 (32); Tom Curran 3/32 (4 overs)		Josh Philippe 81* (44); Chris Jordan 2/13 (3 overs)

Sydney Sixers won by 8 wickets
Sydney Cricket Ground, Sydney
Attendance: 13,247
Umpires: Simon Fry and Phillip Gillespie
Player of the match: Josh Philippe (Sydney Sixers)

- Sydney Sixers won the toss and elected to field.
- Hayden Kerr (Sydney Sixers) made his T20 debut.

19 December 2019
19:10 (D/N)
Scorecard

(H) Melbourne Renegades; 5/169 (20 overs)	v	Sydney Thunder; 4/171 (19.4 overs)
Shaun Marsh 42 (33); Daniel Sams 2/26 (3 overs)		Alex Hales 68 (38); Harry Gurney 2/26 (4 overs)

Sydney Thunder won by 6 wickets
GMHBA Stadium, Geelong
Attendance: 8,421
Umpires: Greg Davidson and Donovan Koch
Player of the match: Alex Hales (Sydney Thunder)

- Melbourne Renegades won the toss and elected to bat.

20 December 2019
14:45
Scorecard

(H) Hobart Hurricanes; 9/129 (20 overs)	v	Sydney Sixers; 104 (18.5 overs)
D'Arcy Short 51 (40); Sean Abbott 3/20 (4 overs)		Josh Philippe 24 (22); Qais Ahmad 4/12 (4 overs)

Hobart Hurricanes won by 25 runs
TIO Traeger Park, Alice Springs
Attendance: 1,057
Umpires: Darren Close and Tony Wilds
Player of the match: Qais Ahmad (Hobart Hurricanes)

- Hobart Hurricanes won the toss and elected to bat.

20 December 2019
19:10 (D/N)
Scorecard

Melbourne Stars; 7/167 (20 overs)	v	Brisbane Heat (H); 8/145 (20 overs)
Glenn Maxwell 83 (39); Matt Renshaw 1/2 (1 over)		Tom Banton 64 (36); Adam Zampa 3/30 (4 overs)

Melbourne Stars won by 22 runs
Metricon Stadium, Gold Coast
Attendance: 11,969
Umpires: Simon Lightbody and John Ward
Player of the match: Glenn Maxwell (Melbourne Stars)

- Brisbane Heat won the toss and elected to field.

21 December 2019
18:10 (D/N)
Scorecard

Adelaide Strikers; 5/161 (20 overs)	v	Sydney Thunder (H); 1/40 (4.2 overs)
Jonathan Wells 55* (32); Daniel Sams 2/21 (4 overs)		Callum Ferguson 27* (14); Billy Stanlake 1/8 (1 over)

No result
Manuka Oval, Canberra
Attendance: 5,556
Umpires: Sam Nogajski and Paul Wilson

- Sydney Thunder won the toss and elected to field.
- Heavy smog from the Australian bushfires during Sydney Thunder's innings prevented any further play.

21 December 2019
21:10 (D/N)
Scorecard

(H) Perth Scorchers; 7/196 (20 overs)	v	Melbourne Renegades; 6/185 (20 overs)
Mitchell Marsh 56* (22); Kane Richardson 4/22 (4 overs)		Beau Webster 67* (37); Fawad Ahmed 2/22 (4 overs)

Perth Scorchers won by 11 runs
Optus Stadium, Perth
Attendance: 23,869
Umpires: Gerard Abood and Shawn Craig
Player of the match: Mitchell Marsh (Perth Scorchers)

- Melbourne Renegades won the toss and elected to field.

22 December 2019
14:45
Scorecard

(H) Melbourne Stars; 4/163 (20 overs)	v	Hobart Hurricanes; 111 (16 overs)
Marcus Stoinis 81* (54); Riley Meredith 3/27 (4 overs)		Clive Rose 32* (18); Haris Rauf 5/27 (4 overs)

Melbourne Stars won by 52 runs
Ted Summerton Reserve, Moe
Attendance: 6,180
Umpires: Greg Davidson and Donovan Koch
Player of the match: Haris Rauf (Melbourne Stars)

- Melbourne Stars won the toss and elected to bat.

22 December 2019
19:10 (D/N)
Scorecard

Brisbane Heat; 4/209 (20 overs)	v	Sydney Sixers (H); 7/161 (20 overs)
Chris Lynn 94 (35); Ben Manenti 2/38 (4 overs)		James Vince 39 (27); Mitchell Swepson 2/27 (4 overs)

Brisbane Heat won by 48 runs
Sydney Cricket Ground, Sydney
Attendance: 14,891
Umpires: Phillip Gillespie and Michael Graham-Smith
Player of the match: Chris Lynn (Brisbane Heat)

- Sydney Sixers won the toss and elected to field.

23 December 2019
19:10 (D/N)
Scorecard

(H) Adelaide Strikers; 4/198 (18 overs)	v	Perth Scorchers; 7/183 (18 overs)
Jake Weatherald 83 (47); Jhye Richardson 2/29 (4 overs)		Liam Livingstone 69 (26); Rashid Khan 3/40 (4 overs)

Adelaide Strikers won by 15 runs (DLS method)
Adelaide Oval, Adelaide
Attendance: 28,308
Umpires: Geoff Joshua and Tony Wilds
Player of the match: Jake Weatherald (Adelaide Strikers)

- Perth Scorchers won the toss and elected to field.
- The match was reduced to 18 overs per side due to rain.

24 December 2019
14:45
Scorecard

Melbourne Renegades; 147 (19.1 overs)	v	Hobart Hurricanes (H); 3/151 (19.1 overs)
Aaron Finch 50 (37); Nathan Ellis 3/15 (3 overs)		D'Arcy Short 60 (45); Tom Cooper 2/32 (4 overs)

Hobart Hurricanes won by 7 wickets
Blundstone Arena, Hobart
Attendance: 8,865
Umpires: Michael Graham-Smith and Sam Nogajski
Player of the match: Riley Meredith (Hobart Hurricanes)

- Melbourne Renegades won the toss and elected to bat.

26 December 2019
19:10 (D/N)
Scorecard

Sydney Sixers; 7/174 (20 overs)	v	Perth Scorchers (H); 126 (18.1 overs)
Tom Curran 43* (21); Chris Jordan 3/29 (4 overs)		Ashton Turner 28 (20); Sean Abbott 3/30 (4 overs)

Sydney Sixers won by 48 runs
Optus Stadium, Perth
Attendance: 30,247
Umpires: Greg Davidson and John Ward
Player of the match: Tom Curran (Sydney Sixers)

- Perth Scorchers won the toss and elected to field.

27 December 2019
19:10 (D/N)
Scorecard

Adelaide Strikers; 4/174 (20 overs)	v	Melbourne Stars (H); 6/169 (20 overs)
Jonathan Wells 68* (46); Sandeep Lamichhane 1/15 (3 overs)		Glenn Maxwell 43 (25); Peter Siddle 3/24 (4 overs)

Adelaide Strikers won by 5 runs
Metricon Stadium, Gold Coast
Attendance: 7,421
Umpires: Shawn Craig and Sam Nogajski
Player of the match: Jonathan Wells (Adelaide Strikers)

- Melbourne Stars won the toss and elected to field.

28 December 2019
19:10 (D/N)
Scorecard

Sydney Thunder; 8/149 (20 overs)	v	Sydney Sixers (H); 7/149 (20 overs)
Callum Ferguson 52 (42); Lloyd Pope 3/23 (4 overs)		Moises Henriques 41 (30); Chris Morris 2/36 (4 overs)

Match tied
(Sydney Sixers won the Super Over)
Sydney Cricket Ground, Sydney
Attendance: 35,296
Umpires: Michael Graham-Smith and Tony Wilds
Player of the match: Tom Curran (Sydney Sixers)

- Sydney Thunder won the toss and elected to bat.

29 December 2019
19:10 (D/N)
Scorecard

Adelaide Strikers; 6/155 (20 overs)	v	Melbourne Renegades (H); 8/137 (20 overs)
Phil Salt 54 (26); Kane Richardson 4/33 (4 overs)		Aaron Finch 50 (39); Rashid Khan 2/15 (4 overs)

Adelaide Strikers won by 18 runs
Marvel Stadium, Melbourne
Attendance: 20,089
Umpires: Greg Davidson and Donovan Koch
Player of the match: Rashid Khan (Adelaide Strikers)

- Adelaide Strikers won the toss and elected to bat.

30 December 2019
19:10 (D/N)
Scorecard

(H) Hobart Hurricanes; 5/69 (11 overs)	v	Melbourne Stars; 3/55 (7.3 overs)
Caleb Jewell 26 (28); Dale Steyn 2/12 (2 overs)		Marcus Stoinis 25 (19); James Faulkner 2/10 (2 overs)

Melbourne Stars won by 4 runs (DLS method)
University of Tasmania Stadium, Launceston
Attendance: 8,753
Umpires: Phillip Gillespie and Tony Wilds
Player of the match: Nathan Coulter-Nile (Melbourne Stars)

- Melbourne Stars won the toss and elected to field.
- The match was reduced to 11 overs per side due to rain. No further play was possible due to rain.

31 December 2019
19:10 (D/N)
Scorecard

Sydney Thunder; 5/168 (20 overs)	v	Adelaide Strikers (H); 9/165 (20 overs)
Callum Ferguson 73 (46); Peter Siddle 2/30 (4 overs)		Jake Weatherald 52 (37); Arjun Nair 2/19 (3 overs)

Sydney Thunder won by 3 runs
Adelaide Oval, Adelaide
Attendance: 41,414
Umpires: Shawn Craig and John Ward
Player of the match: Callum Ferguson (Sydney Thunder)

- Sydney Thunder won the toss and elected to bat.

1 January 2020
19:10 (D/N)
Scorecard

Perth Scorchers; 6/149 (20 overs)	v	Brisbane Heat (H); 109 (18.4 overs)
Cameron Bancroft 50 (42); Zahir Khan 2/18 (4 overs)		Zahir Khan 19* (10); Fawad Ahmed 3/16 (4 overs)

Perth Scorchers won by 40 runs
Metricon Stadium, Gold Coast
Attendance: 20,135
Umpires: Donovan Koch and Tony Wilds
Player of the match: Fawad Ahmed (Perth Scorchers)

- Perth Scorchers won the toss and elected to bat.
- This was the highest attendance for Cricket at this stadium and the Gold Coast

2 January 2020
15:40
Scorecard

(H) Sydney Thunder; 7/142 (20 overs)	v	Melbourne Stars; 7/143 (19.4 overs)
Alex Ross 40 (32); Haris Rauf 3/24 (4 overs)		Nick Larkin 65 (45); Daniel Sams 3/25 (4 overs)

Melbourne Stars won by 3 wickets
Sydney Showground Stadium, Sydney
Attendance: 14,435
Umpires: Michael Graham-Smith and Nathan Johnstone
Player of the match: Nick Larkin (Melbourne Stars)

- Sydney Thunder won the toss and elected to bat.

2 January 2020
19:10 (D/N)
Scorecard

(H) Melbourne Renegades; 6/153 (20 overs)	v	Sydney Sixers; 4/154 (19.5 overs)
Sam Harper 45 (24); Lloyd Pope 2/22 (4 overs)		James Vince 41 (26); Tom Andrews 2/22 (3 overs)

Sydney Sixers won by 6 wickets
Marvel Stadium, Melbourne
Attendance: 11,903
Umpires: Simon Fry and John Ward
Player of the match: James Vince (Sydney Sixers)

- Melbourne Renegades won the toss and elected to bat.

3 January 2020
19:10 (D/N)
Scorecard

Brisbane Heat; 3/212 (20 overs)	v	Hobart Hurricanes (H); 9/181 (20 overs)
Chris Lynn 88* (55); Riley Meredith 1/38 (4 overs)		George Bailey 28 (14); Jack Prestwidge 2/16 (2 overs)

Brisbane Heat won by 31 runs
Blundstone Arena, Hobart
Attendance: 11,861
Umpires: Darren Close and Sam Nogajski
Player of the match: Chris Lynn (Brisbane Heat)

- Hobart Hurricanes won the toss and elected to field.

4 January 2020
18:40 (D/N)
Scorecard

Melbourne Renegades; 9/142 (20 overs)	v	Melbourne Stars (H); 2/143 (18.5 overs)
Shaun Marsh 43 (33); Sandeep Lamichhane 3/26 (4 overs)		Marcus Stoinis 68* (55); Kane Richardson 1/34 (4 overs)

Melbourne Stars won by 8 wickets
Melbourne Cricket Ground, Melbourne
Attendance: 54,478
Umpires: Gerard Abood and Phillip Gillespie
Player of the match: Adam Zampa (Melbourne Stars)

- Melbourne Stars won the toss and elected to field.

5 January 2020
17:40 (D/N)
Scorecard

Adelaide Strikers; 6/176 (20 overs)	v	Sydney Sixers (H); 3/180 (19.3 overs)
Jonathan Wells 40* (28); Lloyd Pope 2/41 (4 overs)		Josh Philippe 83* (52); Peter Siddle 1/29 (3.3 overs)

Sydney Sixers won by 7 wickets
C.ex Coffs International Stadium, Coffs Harbour
Attendance: 9,834
Umpires: Geoff Joshua and Donovan Koch
Player of the match: Josh Philippe (Sydney Sixers)

- Adelaide Strikers won the toss and elected to bat.

5 January 2020
21:40 (D/N)
Scorecard

Hobart Hurricanes; 2/180 (20 overs)	v	Perth Scorchers (H); 8/172 (20 overs)
D'Arcy Short 103* (70); Liam Livingstone 1/2 (1 over)		Mitchell Marsh 48 (36); Scott Boland 2/29 (4 overs)

Hobart Hurricanes won by 8 runs
Optus Stadium, Perth
Attendance: 29,919
Umpires: Michael Graham-Smith and John Ward
Player of the match: D'Arcy Short (Hobart Hurricanes)

- Hobart Hurricanes won the toss and elected to bat.

6 January 2020
19:10 (D/N)
Scorecard

Brisbane Heat; 4/119 (8 overs)	v	Sydney Thunder (H); 4/60 (5 overs)
Tom Banton 56 (19); Daniel Sams 2/24 (2 overs)		Alex Hales 20* (9); Jack Prestwidge 2/15 (1 over)

Brisbane Heat won by 16 runs (DLS method)
Sydney Showground Stadium, Sydney
Attendance: 10,896
Umpires: Greg Davidson and Simon Fry
Player of the match: Tom Banton (Brisbane Heat)

- Brisbane Heat won the toss and elected to bat.
- The match was reduced to 8 overs per side due to rain. Further rain during the second innings reduced it to 5 overs.

7 January 2020
19:10 (D/N)
Scorecard

(H) Melbourne Renegades; 5/175 (20 overs)	v	Perth Scorchers; 4/178 (19 overs)
Sam Harper 73 (46); Jhye Richardson 3/22 (4 overs)		Liam Livingstone 59 (39); Richard Gleeson 3/35 (4 overs)

Perth Scorchers won by 6 wickets
GMHBA Stadium, Geelong
Attendance: 11,568
Umpires: Nathan Johnstone and Paul Wilson
Player of the match: Liam Livingstone (Perth Scorchers)

- Perth Scorchers won the toss and elected to field.

8 January 2020
15:40
Scorecard

(H) Adelaide Strikers; 135 (19.4 overs)	v	Sydney Sixers; 8/137 (18.4 overs)
Jake Weatherald 47 (31); Tom Curran 4/22 (3.4 overs)		James Vince 27 (20); Rashid Khan 4/22 (4 overs)

Sydney Sixers won by 2 wickets
Adelaide Oval, Adelaide
Attendance: 18,287
Umpires: Simon Fry and Michael Graham-Smith
Player of the match: Tom Curran (Sydney Sixers)

- Sydney Sixers won the toss and elected to field.
- Rashid Khan (Adelaide Strikers) took the fifth hat-trick in the BBL.

8 January 2020
19:10 (D/N)
Scorecard

Sydney Thunder; 5/145 (20 overs)	v	Melbourne Stars (H); 4/148 (17.5 overs)
Matthew Gilkes 41 (35); Haris Rauf 3/23 (4 overs)		Glenn Maxwell 59* (37); Arjun Nair 1/15 (2 overs)

Melbourne Stars won by 6 wickets
Melbourne Cricket Ground, Melbourne
Attendance: 21,322
Umpires: Geoff Joshua and Donovan Koch
Player of the match: Haris Rauf (Melbourne Stars)

- Melbourne Stars won the toss and elected to field.
- Haris Rauf (Melbourne Stars) took the sixth hat-trick in the BBL.

9 January 2020
19:10 (D/N)
Scorecard

Hobart Hurricanes; 9/126 (20 overs)	v	Brisbane Heat (H); 5/131 (18.2 overs)
Matthew Wade 61 (46); Josh Lalor 3/21 (4 overs)		Ben Cutting 43* (29); Scott Boland 3/16 (4 overs)

Brisbane Heat won by 5 wickets
The Gabba, Brisbane
Attendance: 29,749
Umpires: Gerard Abood and Shawn Craig
Player of the match: Ben Cutting (Brisbane Heat)

- Hobart Hurricanes won the toss and elected to bat.

10 January 2020
19:10 (D/N)
Scorecard

(H) Melbourne Renegades; 7/168 (20 overs)	v	Melbourne Stars; 3/169 (18.4 overs)
Shaun Marsh 63 (43); Nathan Coulter-Nile 2/29 (4 overs)		Glenn Maxwell 83* (45); Samit Patel 1/21 (4 overs)

Melbourne Stars won by 7 wickets
Marvel Stadium, Melbourne
Attendance: 30,388
Umpires: Simon Fry and Michael Graham-Smith
Player of the match: Glenn Maxwell (Melbourne Stars)

- Melbourne Stars won the toss and elected to field.
- Lance Morris (Melbourne Stars) made his T20 debut.

11 January 2020
18:10 (D/N)
Scorecard

Hobart Hurricanes; 6/162 (20 overs)	v	Sydney Thunder (H); 6/166 (19.4 overs)
George Bailey 43 (30); Daniel Sams 2/29 (4 overs)		Alex Hales 55 (36); Clive Rose 2/27 (4 overs)

Sydney Thunder won by 4 wickets
Sydney Showground Stadium, Sydney
Attendance: 11,454
Umpires: Tony Wilds and Paul Wilson
Player of the match: Alex Hales (Sydney Thunder)

- Sydney Thunder won the toss and elected to field.

11 January 2020
21:10 (D/N)
Scorecard

(H) Perth Scorchers; 3/213 (20 overs)	v	Brisbane Heat; 8/179 (20 overs)
Mitchell Marsh 93* (41); Zahir Khan 1/33 (4 overs)		Tom Banton 55 (32); Joel Paris 2/29 (4 overs)

Perth Scorchers won by 34 runs
Optus Stadium, Perth
Attendance: 29,321
Umpires: Geoff Joshua and John Ward
Player of the match: Mitchell Marsh (Perth Scorchers)

- Perth Scorchers won the toss and elected to bat.

12 January 2020
15:40
Scorecard

(H) Adelaide Strikers; 6/173 (20 overs)	v	Melbourne Renegades; 110 (17.4 overs)
Jonathan Wells 58 (38); Cameron Boyce 1/22 (4 overs)		Beau Webster 49 (33); Peter Siddle 3/14 (3 overs)

Adelaide Strikers won by 63 runs
Adelaide Oval, Adelaide
Attendance: 28,271
Umpires: Gerard Abood and Shawn Craig
Player of the match: Jonathan Wells (Adelaide Strikers)

- Adelaide Strikers won the toss and elected to bat.

12 January 2020
19:10 (D/N)
Scorecard

(H) Melbourne Stars; 1/219 (20 overs)	v	Sydney Sixers; 7/175 (20 overs)
Marcus Stoinis 147* (79); Tom Curran 1/58 (4 overs)		Ben Dwarshuis 42* (17); Clint Hinchliffe 3/20 (4 overs)

Melbourne Stars won by 44 runs
Melbourne Cricket Ground, Melbourne
Attendance: 21,556
Umpires: Phillip Gillespie and Donovan Koch
Player of the match: Marcus Stoinis (Melbourne Stars)

- Sydney Sixers won the toss and elected to field.
- Marcus Stoinis (Melbourne Stars) scored the highest individual score in a BBL match.

13 January 2020
19:10 (D/N)
Scorecard

Perth Scorchers; 7/175 (20 overs)	v	Hobart Hurricanes (H); 98 (17.1 overs)
Josh Inglis 73 (46); Tom Rogers 2/30 (4 overs)		George Bailey 36 (31); Jhye Richardson 4/19 (4 overs)

Perth Scorchers won by 77 runs
Blundstone Arena, Hobart
Attendance: 10,174
Umpires: Greg Davidson and Simon Lightbody
Player of the match: Josh Inglis (Perth Scorchers)

- Hobart Hurricanes won the toss and elected to field.

14 January 2020
15:40
Scorecard

Adelaide Strikers; 110 (19 overs)	v	Brisbane Heat (H); 3/114 (15.2 overs)
Rashid Khan 28 (27); James Pattinson 5/33 (4 overs)		Matt Renshaw 52* (45); Liam O'Connor 1/22 (3 overs)

Brisbane Heat won by 7 wickets
The Gabba, Brisbane
Attendance: 19,681
Umpires: Tony Wilds and Paul Wilson
Player of the match: James Pattinson (Brisbane Heat)

- Adelaide Strikers won the toss and elected to bat.

15 January 2020
18:10 (D/N)
Scorecard

Melbourne Renegades; 4/172 (20 overs)	v	Sydney Thunder (H); 7/122 (14 overs)
Sam Harper 52 (38); Liam Bowe 2/23 (4 overs)		Alex Ross 51 (27); Dan Christian 3/14 (2 overs)

Melbourne Renegades won by 12 runs (DLS method)
Manuka Oval, Canberra
Attendance: 9,005
Umpires: Simon Fry and Donovan Koch
Player of the match: Sam Harper (Melbourne Renegades)

- Melbourne Renegades won the toss and elected to bat.
- Sydney Thunder were given a revised target of 135 runs from 14 overs due to rain.

15 January 2020
21:10 (D/N)
Scorecard

(H) Perth Scorchers; 86 (13.5 overs)	v	Melbourne Stars; 2/89 (12 overs)
Josh Inglis 37 (19); Jackson Coleman 3/16 (3 overs)		Marcus Stoinis 39* (31); Mitchell Marsh 1/15 (2 overs)

Melbourne Stars won by 8 wickets
Optus Stadium, Perth
Attendance: 25,074
Umpires: Gerard Abood and Nathan Johnstone
Player of the match: Jackson Coleman (Melbourne Stars)

- Perth Scorchers won the toss and elected to bat.
- Jaron Morgan (Perth Scorchers) made his T20 debut.

16 January 2020
19:10 (D/N)
Scorecard

(H) Sydney Sixers; 2/45 (6.4 overs)	v	Hobart Hurricanes
Daniel Hughes 26* (22); Clive Rose 1/11 (2 overs); Scott Boland 1/11 (2 overs)

No result
Sydney Cricket Ground, Sydney
Attendance: 13,338
Umpires: Geoff Joshua and Paul Wilson

- Hobart Hurricanes won the toss and elected to field.
- Rain during Sydney Sixers' innings prevented any further play.

17 January 2020
15:40
Scorecard

Brisbane Heat; 100 (17 overs)	v	Adelaide Strikers (H); 0/104 (10.5 overs)
Matt Renshaw 43 (31); Liam O'Connor 3/30 (4 overs)		Phil Salt 67* (38)

Adelaide Strikers won by 10 wickets
Adelaide Oval, Adelaide
Attendance: 18,463
Umpires: Shawn Craig and Phillip Gillespie
Player of the match: Liam O'Connor (Adelaide Strikers)

- Brisbane Heat won the toss and elected to bat.

18 January 2020
15:40
Scorecard

(H) Melbourne Stars; 6/141 (20 overs)	v	Perth Scorchers; 9/131 (20 overs)
Hilton Cartwright 58* (56); Matthew Kelly 3/27 (4 overs)		Cameron Bancroft 32 (44); Nic Maddinson 3/24 (4 overs)

Melbourne Stars won by 10 runs
Melbourne Cricket Ground, Melbourne
Attendance: 28,042
Umpires: Darren Close and Paul Wilson
Player of the match: Glenn Maxwell (Melbourne Stars)

- Melbourne Stars won the toss and elected to bat.

18 January 2020
19:10 (D/N)
Scorecard

Sydney Sixers; 76 (15.5 overs)	v	Sydney Thunder (H); 2/28 (5.3 overs)
Justin Avendano 28 (31); Daniel Sams 3/14 (3 overs)		Usman Khawaja 13 (14); Jackson Bird 1/5 (3 overs)

Sydney Thunder won by 4 runs (DLS method)
Sydney Showground Stadium, Sydney
Attendance: 15,476
Umpires: Gerard Abood and Tony Wilds
Player of the match: Chris Morris (Sydney Thunder)

- Sydney Thunder won the toss and elected to field.
- The match was reduced to 16 overs per side due to rain. No further play was possible due to rain.

19 January 2020
14:45
Scorecard

Adelaide Strikers; 5/186 (20 overs)	v	Hobart Hurricanes (H); 6/176 (20 overs)
Travis Head 79 (40); Scott Boland 2/26 (4 overs)		David Miller 90* (48); Wes Agar 4/33 (4 overs)

Adelaide Strikers won by 10 runs
University of Tasmania Stadium, Launceston
Attendance: 6,181
Umpires: Simon Fry and John Ward
Player of the match: Travis Head (Adelaide Strikers)

- Hobart Hurricanes won the toss and elected to field.

19 January 2020
19:10 (D/N)
Scorecard

Melbourne Renegades; 6/164 (20 overs)	v	Brisbane Heat (H); 120 (15 overs)
Beau Webster 36 (26); Ben Laughlin 3/31 (4 overs)		Sam Heazlett 56 (37); Cameron Boyce 4/15 (4 overs)

Melbourne Renegades won by 44 runs
The Gabba, Brisbane
Attendance: 27,524
Umpires: Greg Davidson and Simon Lightbody
Player of the match: Cameron Boyce (Melbourne Renegades)

- Brisbane Heat won the toss and elected to field.
- Brisbane Heat suffered the worst 10-wicket collapse in a BBL match, losing all ten wickets for 36 runs, including the last seven wickets for seven runs in 16 balls.

20 January 2020
18:40 (D/N)
Scorecard

(H) Sydney Sixers; 4/143 (14 overs)	v	Melbourne Stars; 5/125 (14 overs)
Moises Henriques 72 (31); Sandeep Lamichhane 2/38 (3 overs)		Marcus Stoinis 62 (37); Ben Dwarshuis 2/20 (3 overs)

Sydney Sixers won by 21 runs (DLS method)
Sydney Cricket Ground, Sydney
Attendance: 15,643
Umpires: Gerard Abood and Paul Wilson
Player of the match: Moises Henriques (Sydney Sixers)

- Melbourne Stars won the toss and elected to field.
- The match was reduced to 14 overs per side due to rain.

20 January 2020
21:40 (D/N)
Scorecard

Sydney Thunder; 5/153 (20 overs)	v	Perth Scorchers (H); 2/154 (15.3 overs)
Alex Hales 85 (59); Chris Jordan 3/28 (4 overs)		Liam Livingstone 78 (49); Gurinder Sandhu 1/33 (4 overs)

Perth Scorchers won by 8 wickets
Optus Stadium, Perth
Attendance: 18,039
Umpires: Phillip Gillespie and Geoff Joshua
Player of the match: Liam Livingstone (Perth Scorchers)

- Sydney Thunder won the toss and elected to bat.

21 January 2020
19:10 (D/N)
Scorecard

Hobart Hurricanes; 3/190 (20 overs)	v	Melbourne Renegades (H); 4/186 (20 overs)
Mac Wright 70* (50); Cameron Boyce 2/27 (4 overs)		Mohammad Nabi 63 (30); Qais Ahmad 1/25 (4 overs)

Hobart Hurricanes won by 4 runs
Marvel Stadium, Melbourne
Attendance: 12,241
Umpires: Shawn Craig and Tony Wilds
Player of the match: Mac Wright (Hobart Hurricanes)

- Melbourne Renegades won the toss and elected to field.
- As a result of this match, Melbourne Renegades were eliminated.

22 January 2020
19:10 (D/N)
Scorecard

(H) Adelaide Strikers; 4/162 (20 overs)	v	Melbourne Stars; 8/151 (20 overs)
Jonathan Wells 55* (36); Clint Hinchliffe 3/19 (3 overs)		Peter Handscomb 65* (39); Peter Siddle 4/33 (4 overs)

Adelaide Strikers won by 11 runs
Adelaide Oval, Adelaide
Attendance: 23,014
Umpires: Greg Davidson and Donovan Koch
Player of the match: Jonathan Wells (Adelaide Strikers)

- Melbourne Stars won the toss and elected to field.

23 January 2020
19:10 (D/N)
Scorecard

(H) Brisbane Heat; 8/126 (20 overs)	v	Sydney Sixers; 2/127 (15.5 overs)
James Pattinson 27* (15); Jackson Bird 2/21 (4 overs)		Josh Philippe 52* (43); James Pattinson 1/19 (3.5 overs)

Sydney Sixers won by 8 wickets
The Gabba, Brisbane
Attendance: 26,327
Umpires: Phillip Gillespie and Geoff Joshua
Player of the match: Steve O'Keefe (Sydney Sixers)

- Sydney Sixers won the toss and elected to field.

24 January 2020
18:10 (D/N)
Scorecard

(H) Hobart Hurricanes; 6/185 (20 overs)	v	Sydney Thunder; 128 (17.3 overs)
Mac Wright 64 (45); Daniel Sams 4/34 (4 overs)		Alex Hales 63 (42); D'Arcy Short 5/21 (4 overs)

Hobart Hurricanes won by 57 runs
Blundstone Arena, Hobart
Attendance: 8,468
Umpires: Gerard Abood and Simon Lightbody
Player of the match: D'Arcy Short (Hobart Hurricanes)

- Hobart Hurricanes won the toss and elected to bat.

24 January 2020
21:10 (D/N)
Scorecard

Adelaide Strikers; 5/181 (20 overs)	v	Perth Scorchers (H); 7/165 (20 overs)
Phil Salt 59 (31); Matthew Kelly 2/26 (3 overs)		Liam Livingstone 79 (54); Wes Agar 3/36 (4 overs)

Adelaide Strikers won by 16 runs
Optus Stadium, Perth
Attendance: 29,636
Umpires: Michael Graham-Smith and Nathan Johnstone
Player of the match: Wes Agar (Adelaide Strikers)

- Adelaide Strikers won the toss and elected to bat.

25 January 2020
15:40
Scorecard

Melbourne Renegades; 5/175 (20 overs)	v	Sydney Sixers (H); 3/176 (18.4 overs)
Aaron Finch 109 (68); Tom Curran 3/27 (4 overs)		Steve Smith 66* (40); Will Sutherland 1/24 (3.4 overs)

Sydney Sixers won by 7 wickets
Sydney Cricket Ground, Sydney
Attendance: 23,587
Umpires: Darren Close and Paul Wilson
Player of the match: Steve Smith (Sydney Sixers)

- Sydney Sixers won the toss and elected to field.
- Nathan McSweeney and Brayden Stepien (Melbourne Renegades) both made their T20 debuts.

25 January 2020
19:10 (D/N)
Scorecard

Brisbane Heat; 5/186 (20 overs)	v	(H) Melbourne Stars; 115 (17.4 overs)
AB de Villiers 71 (37); Adam Zampa 3/27 (4 overs)		Peter Handscomb 27 (18); Mitchell Swepson 3/31 (4 overs)

Brisbane Heat won by 71 runs
Melbourne Cricket Ground, Melbourne
Attendance: 27,676
Umpires: Shawn Craig and John Ward
Player of the match: AB de Villiers (Brisbane Heat)

- Brisbane Heat won the toss and elected to bat.
- Dilbar Hussain (Melbourne Stars) made his T20 debut.

26 January 2020
14:45
Scorecard

Perth Scorchers; 4/99 (15 overs)	v	Sydney Thunder (H); 3/97 (11.4 overs)
Cameron Bancroft 35* (25); Chris Morris 1/9 (2 overs)		Alex Hales 47 (27); Jhye Richardson 1/13 (3 overs)

Sydney Thunder won by 7 wickets (DLS method)
Sydney Showground Stadium, Sydney
Attendance: 9,395
Umpires: Greg Davidson and Simon Fry
Player of the match: Alex Hales (Sydney Thunder)

- Perth Scorchers won the toss and elected to bat.
- Sydney Thunder were set a revised target of 96 runs from 12 overs.

26 January 2020
19:10 (D/N)
Scorecard

Hobart Hurricanes; 1/217 (20 overs)	v	Adelaide Strikers (H); 8/207 (20 overs)
Matthew Wade 130* (61); Michael Neser 1/26 (3 overs)		Phil Salt 66 (33); Clive Rose 2/16 (2 overs)

Hobart Hurricanes won by 10 runs
Adelaide Oval, Adelaide
Attendance: 27,390
Umpires: Michael Graham-Smith and Geoff Joshua
Player of the match: Matthew Wade (Hobart Hurricanes)

- Hobart Hurricanes won the toss and elected to bat.

27 January 2020
14:45
Scorecard

Brisbane Heat; 7/154 (20 overs)	v	Melbourne Renegades (H); 3/155 (19.2 overs)
Matt Renshaw 65 (47); Will Sutherland 3/30 (3 overs)		Aaron Finch 63* (49); Ben Cutting 2/35 (2.2 overs)

Melbourne Renegades won by 7 wickets
Marvel Stadium, Melbourne
Attendance: 14,087
Umpires: Phillip Gillespie and Paul Wilson
Player of the match: Aaron Finch (Melbourne Renegades)

- Brisbane Heat won the toss and elected to bat.
- Zak Evans (Melbourne Renegades) made his T20 debut.

== Play-offs ==
Eliminator
4	Hobart Hurricanes (H)	140
5	Sydney Thunder	5/197

Qualifier
1	Melbourne Stars (H)	99
2	Sydney Sixers	7/142
Knockout
3	Adelaide Strikers (H)	9/143
5	Sydney Thunder	7/151

Challenger
1	Melbourne Stars (H)	2/194
5	Sydney Thunder	8/166

Final
2	Sydney Sixers (H)	5/116
1	Melbourne Stars	6/97

=== Eliminator ===
30 January 2020
19:40 (D/N)
Scorecard

Sydney Thunder; 5/197 (20 overs)	v	Hobart Hurricanes (H); 140 (18.3 overs)
Alex Hales 60 (37); Nathan Ellis 1/18 (4 overs)		D'Arcy Short 37 (24); Jonathan Cook 4/21 (4 overs)

Sydney Thunder won by 57 runs
Blundstone Arena, Hobart
Attendance: 11,031
Umpires: Shawn Craig and Paul Wilson
Player of the match: Jonathan Cook (Sydney Thunder)

- Sydney Thunder won the toss and elected to bat.

=== Qualifier ===
31 January 2020
19:15 (D/N)
Scorecard

Sydney Sixers; 7/142 (20 overs)	v	Melbourne Stars (H); 99 (18 overs)
Josh Philippe 34 (28); Adam Zampa 3/21 (4 overs)		Clint Hinchliffe 25* (25); Sean Abbott 3/23 (4 overs)

Sydney Sixers won by 43 runs
Melbourne Cricket Ground, Melbourne
Attendance: 13,275
Umpires: Gerard Abood and Phillip Gillespie
Player of the match: Steve O'Keefe (Sydney Sixers)

- Melbourne Stars won the toss and elected to field.

=== Knockout ===
1 February 2020
19:40 (D/N)
Scorecard

Sydney Thunder; 7/151 (20 overs)	v	Adelaide Strikers (H); 9/143 (20 overs)
Alex Hales 59 (35); Peter Siddle 2/21 (4 overs)		Jonathan Wells 34 (27); Daniel Sams 3/26 (4 overs)

Sydney Thunder won by 8 runs
Adelaide Oval, Adelaide
Attendance: 15,963
Umpires: Shawn Craig and Paul Wilson
Player of the match: Alex Hales (Sydney Thunder)

- Adelaide Strikers won the toss and elected to field.

=== Challenger ===
6 February 2020
19:40 (D/N)
Scorecard

(H) Melbourne Stars; 2/194 (20 overs)	v	Sydney Thunder; 8/166 (20 overs)
Nick Larkin 83* (49); Chris Morris 2/30 (4 overs)		Alex Ross 58 (38); Haris Rauf 3/17 (4 overs)

Melbourne Stars won by 28 runs
Melbourne Cricket Ground, Melbourne
Attendance: 13,067
Umpires: Gerard Abood and Shawn Craig
Player of the match: Nick Larkin (Melbourne Stars)

- Melbourne Stars won the toss and elected to bat.

=== Final ===
8 February 2020
19:15 (D/N)
Scorecard

(H) Sydney Sixers; 5/116 (12 overs)	v	Melbourne Stars; 6/97 (12 overs)
Josh Philippe 52 (29); Glenn Maxwell 2/17 (2 overs)		Nick Larkin 38* (26); Nathan Lyon 2/19 (2 overs)

Sydney Sixers won by 19 runs
Sydney Cricket Ground, Sydney
Attendance: 10,121
Umpires: Gerard Abood and Paul Wilson
Player of the match: Josh Philippe (Sydney Sixers)

- Melbourne Stars won the toss and elected to field.
- The match was reduced to 12 overs per side due to rain.
