= List of Big Bash League centuries =

In cricket, a batter reaches a century when he or she scores 100 or more runs in a single innings. A century is regarded as a landmark score for a batter, and their number of centuries is generally recorded in their career statistics. The Big Bash League (BBL) is a professional league for Twenty20 cricket in Australia, which has been held annually since its first edition in 2011–12. In the fifteen seasons played, 49 centuries have been scored. Batters from all of the eight franchises have scored centuries.

The first century in the BBL was achieved on 17 December 2011 at the Melbourne Cricket Ground by David Warner for the Sydney Thunder against the Melbourne Stars. Of the 49 centuries, only 9 have been scored by overseas batters—two by Luke Wright and one by Chris Gayle, Alex Hales, Colin Munro, Joe Clarke, James Vince, Tim Seifert and Finn Allen each. Steve Smith is the only player to have scored four BBL centuries.

As of 2026, the record for the highest individual score in the BBL is held by Glenn Maxwell, who was the captain of the Melbourne Stars when he scored 154 runs (not out) from 64 balls. The fastest to reach a century is tied between Craig Simmons and Mitchell Owen, who both achieved the score in just 39 balls faced. Jake Weatherald and Mitchell Owen are the only players to score a century in the final. Weatherald achieved the feat in the final of 2017–18 season and Owen did it in the final of 2024–25 season. Josh Brown hit the most sixes (12) in an innings in BBL history en route to scoring 140 runs in 57 balls against Adelaide Strikers in the 2023–24 season. Additionally, only once have two centuries been scored in a single innings, with Jack Wildermuth and Matt Renshaw scoring 110* off 54 balls and 102 off 51 balls for the Brisbane Heat, respectively.

The below list includes all BBL centuries organised in a chronological order. These statistics do not cover any of the matches played in the Champions League Twenty20.

== Key ==
Symbol	Meaning
#	Serial number of century
*	Remained not out
†	Captained their team at the time of century
Balls	Balls faced during the innings
S/R.	Strike rate during the innings
Inn.	The innings of the match
Won	The match was won by the team for which the player played
Lost	The match was lost by the team for which the player played

== Centuries ==
Big Bash League centuries
#	Score	Balls	S/R	Player	Team	Opposition	Inn.	Venue	Date	Result
1	102*	51	200.00	David Warner † (1/3)	Sydney Thunder	Melbourne Stars	2	Melbourne Cricket Ground, Melbourne	17 December 2011	Won
2	100*	54	185.18	Chris Gayle	Sydney Thunder	Adelaide Strikers	2	Stadium Australia, Sydney	23 December 2011	Won
3	117	60	195.00	Luke Wright (1/2)	Melbourne Stars	Hobart Hurricanes	1	Bellerive Oval, Hobart	9 January 2012	Won
4	111*	65	170.76	Aaron Finch † (1/2)	Melbourne Renegades	Melbourne Stars	1	Docklands Stadium, Melbourne	7 December 2012	Won
5	112*	70	160.00	Luke Pomersbach	Brisbane Heat	Melbourne Renegades	1	Docklands Stadium, Melbourne	15 January 2013	Won
6	102	41	248.78	Craig Simmons (1/2)	Perth Scorchers	Adelaide Strikers	1	WACA Ground, Perth	16 January 2014	Won
7	112	58	193.10	Craig Simmons (2/2)	Perth Scorchers	Sydney Sixers	1	Sydney Cricket Ground, Sydney	5 February 2014	Won
8	105*	60	175.00	Michael Klinger	Perth Scorchers	Melbourne Renegades	1	WACA Ground, Perth	26 December 2014	Won
9	103*	64	160.93	Peter Handscomb	Melbourne Stars	Perth Scorchers	2	Melbourne Cricket Ground, Melbourne	21 January 2015	Won
10	109*	70	155.71	Usman Khawaja (1/2)	Sydney Thunder	Melbourne Stars	1	Melbourne Cricket Ground, Melbourne	20 December 2015	Won
11	101	51	198.03	Chris Lynn †	Brisbane Heat	Hobart Hurricanes	2	The Gabba, Brisbane	29 December 2015	Lost
12	101*	53	190.56	Travis Head	Adelaide Strikers	Sydney Sixers	2	Adelaide Oval, Adelaide	31 December 2015	Won
13	109*	63	173.01	Luke Wright (2/2)	Melbourne Stars	Melbourne Renegades	2	Melbourne Cricket Ground, Melbourne	2 January 2016	Won
14	104*	59	176.27	Usman Khawaja (2/2)	Sydney Thunder	Adelaide Strikers	2	Adelaide Oval, Adelaide	21 January 2016	Won
15	114	52	219.23	Ben McDermott (1/3)	Hobart Hurricanes	Melbourne Renegades	2	Docklands Stadium, Melbourne	12 January 2017	Won
16	122*	69	176.81	D'Arcy Short (1/2)	Hobart Hurricanes	Brisbane Heat	1	The Gabba, Brisbane	10 January 2018	Won
17	100	56	178.57	Alex Carey (1/2)	Adelaide Strikers	Hobart Hurricanes	1	Adelaide Oval, Adelaide	17 January 2018	Won
18	115	70	164.28	Jake Weatherald	Adelaide Strikers	Hobart Hurricanes	1	Adelaide Oval, Adelaide	4 February 2018	Won
19	100	62	161.29	Shane Watson †	Sydney Thunder	Brisbane Heat	1	The Gabba, Brisbane	17 January 2019	No result
20	113*	53	213.21	Callum Ferguson	Sydney Thunder	Perth Scorchers	2	Perth Stadium, Perth	24 January 2019	Won
21	103*	70	147.14	D'Arcy Short (2/2)	Hobart Hurricanes	Perth Scorchers	1	Perth Stadium, Perth	5 January 2020	Won
22	147*	79	186.07	Marcus Stoinis	Melbourne Stars	Sydney Sixers	1	Melbourne Cricket Ground, Melbourne	12 January 2020	Won
23	109	68	160.29	Aaron Finch † (2/2)	Melbourne Renegades	Sydney Sixers	1	Sydney Cricket Ground, Sydney	25 January 2020	Lost
24	130*	61	213.11	Matthew Wade †	Hobart Hurricanes	Adelaide Strikers	1	Adelaide Oval, Adelaide	26 January 2020	Won
25	101	62	162.90	Alex Carey (2/2)	Adelaide Strikers	Brisbane Heat	1	Adelaide Oval, Adelaide	21 January 2021	Won
26	110	56	196.42	Alex Hales	Sydney Thunder	Sydney Sixers	1	Adelaide Oval, Adelaide	22 January 2021	Won
27	114*	73	156.16	Colin Munro	Perth Scorchers	Adelaide Strikers	1	Sydney Showground Stadium, Sydney	11 December 2021	Won
28	100*	60	166.66	Mitchell Marsh (1/2)	Perth Scorchers	Hobart Hurricanes	1	Bellerive Oval, Hobart	14 December 2021	Won
29	103	57	180.70	Glenn Maxwell † (1/2)	Melbourne Stars	Sydney Sixers	1	Melbourne Cricket Ground, Melbourne	15 December 2021	Lost
30	110*	60	183.33	Ben McDermott (2/3)	Hobart Hurricanes	Adelaide Strikers	2	Bellerive Oval, Hobart	27 December 2021	Won
31	127	65	195.38	Ben McDermott (3/3)	Hobart Hurricanes	Melbourne Renegades	1	Docklands Stadium, Melbourne	29 December 2021	Won
32	154*	64	240.62	Glenn Maxwell † (2/2)	Melbourne Stars	Hobart Hurricanes	1	Melbourne Cricket Ground, Melbourne	19 January 2022	Won
33	101*	66	153.03	Joe Clarke	Melbourne Stars	Hobart Hurricanes	1	Melbourne Cricket Ground, Melbourne	16 December 2022	Won
34	100*	59	169.49	Matthew Short † (1/2)	Adelaide Strikers	Hobart Hurricanes	2	Adelaide Oval, Adelaide	5 January 2023	Won
35	101	56	180.35	Steve Smith (1/4)	Sydney Sixers	Adelaide Strikers	1	Coffs Harbour International Stadium, Coffs Harbour	17 January 2023	Won
36	125*	66	189.39	Steve Smith (2/4)	Sydney Sixers	Sydney Thunder	1	Sydney Cricket Ground, Sydney	21 January 2023	Won
37	140	57	245.61	Josh Brown	Brisbane Heat	Adelaide Strikers	1	Carrara Stadium, Gold Coast	22 January 2024	Won
38	101*	64	157.81	Mitchell Owen (1/2)	Hobart Hurricanes	Perth Scorchers	2	Bellerive Oval, Hobart	21 December 2024	Won
39	101*	58	174.13	James Vince	Sydney Sixers	Melbourne Stars	2	Sydney Cricket Ground, Sydney	26 December 2024	Won
40	121*	64	189.06	Steve Smith (3/4)	Sydney Sixers	Perth Scorchers	1	Sydney Cricket Ground, Sydney	11 January 2025	Won
41	109	54	201.85	Matthew Short † (2/2)	Adelaide Strikers	Brisbane Heat	1	Adelaide Oval, Adelaide	11 January 2025	Won
42	108	42	257.14	Mitchell Owen (2/2)	Hobart Hurricanes	Sydney Thunder	2	Bellerive Oval, Hobart	27 January 2025	Won
43	102	56	182.14	Tim Seifert	Melbourne Renegades	Brisbane Heat	1	Kardinia Park, Geelong	15 December 2025	Won
44	110*	54	203.70	Jack Wildermuth	Brisbane Heat	Perth Scorchers	2	The Gabba, Brisbane	19 December 2025	Won
45	102	51	200.00	Matt Renshaw	Brisbane Heat	Perth Scorchers	2	The Gabba, Brisbane	19 December 2025	Won
46	110*	60	183.33	Sam Harper	Melbourne Stars	Sydney Sixers	2	Sydney Cricket Ground, Sydney	26 December 2025	Won
47	102	58	175.86	Mitchell Marsh (2/2)	Perth Scorchers	Hobart Hurricanes	1	Bellerive Oval, Hobart	1 January 2026	Won
48	130*	65	200.00	David Warner † (2/3)	Sydney Thunder	Hobart Hurricanes	1	Sydney Showground Stadium, Sydney	3 January 2026	Lost
49	101	53	190.56	Finn Allen	Perth Scorchers	Melbourne Renegades	1	Docklands Stadium, Melbourne	15 January 2026	Won
50	110*	65	169.23	David Warner † (3/3)	Sydney Thunder	Sydney Sixers	1	Sydney Cricket Ground, Sydney	16 January 2026	Lost
51	100	42	238.10	Steve Smith (4/4)	Sydney Sixers	Sydney Thunder	2	Sydney Cricket Ground, Sydney	16 January 2026	Won

== See also ==
- List of Big Bash League records and statistics
- List of Big Bash League five-wicket hauls
