= Arjun Nair =

Australian cricketer (born 1998)

Personal information
- Full name: Arjun Jayanand Nair
- Born: 12 April 1998 (age 28); Canberra, Australian Capital Territory
- Batting: Right-handed
- Bowling: Right-arm offbreak
- Role: All-rounder

Domestic team information
- Years: Team
- 2015/16–present: New South Wales (squad no. 7)
- 2016/17: Cricket Australia XI (squad no. 7)
- 2016/17–present: Sydney Thunder (squad no. 7)
- FC debut: 25 February 2016 New South Wales v South Australia
- LA debut: 13 August 2016 National Performance Squad v South Africa A

Career statistics
Competition	FC	LA	T20
Matches	5	15	36
Runs scored	106	174	251
Batting average	15.14	19.33	20.91
100s/50s	0/0	0/1	0/0
Top score	42	67	45
Balls bowled	740	744	486
Wickets	4	20	23
Bowling average	86.00	34.25	27.08
5 wickets in innings	0	0	0
10 wickets in match	0	0	0
Best bowling	2/71	3/15	3/12
Catches/stumpings	2/–	4/–	9/–
- Source: ESPNcricinfo, 3 January 2022

Arjun Nair (born 12 April 1998) is an Australian cricketer. He is of Indian descent.

Nair is an all-rounder who bats in right hand and bowls right arm off-spin.

== Early life and education ==
Nair was born on 12 April 1998 in Canberra, Australia to parents of Indian descent who moved to Australia from Thrippunithura, Kerala. He graduated from Patrician Brothers' College, Blacktown in 2015.

== Career ==
Nair started playing cricket at the age of three, with formal coaching starting at the age of four under Coach Ganesh. Displaying early talent, he was playing under-10s cricket by the age of six. At 13, Nair commenced playing Grade cricket and progressed to First Grade cricket at 15, making him the youngest player of Indian background to compete in Sydney's First Grade and the ninth youngest in its 120-year history.

Nair, a right-hand top-order batsman and off-spin bowler, had notable achievements in Australian junior cricket by the age of 17. He was a standout performer in the 2015 All Schools Under-19 championship, scoring five centuries in the Green Shield championship. His performance in the Green Shield championship included an aggregate of 996 runs from 21 matches. Additionally, he took a six-wicket haul in the Under-19 National Championship in Adelaide, earning him the player of the final award.

Nair's consistent performance in junior cricket led to several accolades, including the Rising Star and Sports Person of the Year awards from Patrician Brothers College, and the Sports Person of the Year 2013 from Richmond. He was also named the Sports Person of the Year in the 2012 Wenty Leagues. His performance earned him selection in the Australian Under-19 team for the junior Ashes series in the UK, where he debuted with a four-wicket spell against England.

Nair was selected in National Performance Squad of Australia when he was 19 years old. He made his first-class debut for New South Wales in February 2016 in the 2015–16 Sheffield Shield against South Australia at International Sports Stadium, Coffs Harbour. Later, he became part of the Sydney Thunder squad in the Big Bash League. He made his Twenty20 (T20) debut for Sydney Thunder in the 2016–17 Big Bash League season on 22 December 2016.

In 2018, Nair was banned for bowling for three months due to illegal bowling action.
