= Jonathan Wells (cricketer) =

Australian cricketer

Jon Wells
Personal information
- Full name: Jonathan Wayne Wells
- Born: 13 August 1988 (age 38); Hobart, Tasmania, Australia
- Batting: Right-handed
- Bowling: Right-arm medium
- Role: Middle-order batter

Domestic team information
- Years: Team
- 2008/09–2014/15: Tasmania
- 2011/12–2016/17: Hobart Hurricanes
- 2015/16–2018/19: Western Australia
- 2017/18–2021/22: Adelaide Strikers
- 2021: Peshawar Zalmi
- 2022–: Melbourne Renegades

Career statistics
Competition	FC	LA	T20
Matches	56	32	147
Runs scored	2,365	734	3,174
Batting average	23.41	31.91	33.41
100s/50s	3/8	2/2	0/16
Top score	120	121*	73
Balls bowled	328	42	19
Wickets	1	1	0
Bowling average	203.00	36.00	–
5 wickets in innings	0	0	–
10 wickets in match	0	0	–
Best bowling	1/28	1/6	–
Catches/stumpings	36/–	10/–	49/–
- Source: ESPNcricinfo, 4 November 2023

Jonathan Wayne Wells (born 13 August 1988) is an Australian cricket player, who plays for Western Australia in first-class and one-day cricket, and the Melbourne Renegades in the Big Bash League (BBL). He originates from Tasmania, and represented Tasmania in both first-class and one-day cricket previously.

Wells spent several seasons on the cusp of selection for Tasmania before making his first-class debut in 2008. He spent the next seven years fighting to keep a spot in the state team while improving his form in both one-day and Twenty20 cricket, playing for the Hobart Hurricanes in the BBL. In 2015 he was cut from Tasmania's squad for the second time and moved to Western Australia to seek more opportunities, earning a contract with his new state in 2016.

Wells played for the Hobart Hurricanes in the BBL for the first six seasons of the tournament before switching teams to the Adelaide Strikers. In his first season with the Strikers he won the tournament after coming up against his former side in the final.

== Early life ==
Wells was born in Hobart, Tasmania. He played both junior cricket and Australian rules football and was a member of the Tassie Mariners TAC Cup side in 2005. He was the 2004–05 Tasmanian under-17 "Player of the Championships", and was also the 2005 National under-17 "Player of the Championships". He gained selection in the Australian squad of 30 for the 2006 Under-19 World Cup and the Tasmanian second XI in 2005–06. He was called up to the Tigers' senior squad despite his youth in 2006 due to his impressive form in representative sides over the previous seasons. He went into his second season on a rookie contract, the 2007–08 season, looking to break into Tasmania's batting lineup, but he didn't make his debut for the state until his third season.

== First-class career ==
=== Tasmania (2008–2015) ===
Wells received his first call up to the Tigers senior side in December 2008, based upon his solid performances in the Tasmanian Grade Cricket competition, and the indifferent form of the Tigers top order in the start of the 2008-09 season. He made his Sheffield Shield debut at home against the New South Wales Blues, and despite nervously running himself out for 4 in his first innings, he made a solid contribution of 46 in the second innings to give an indication of his potential at first-class level. He took advantage of Tasmania's unsettled top order and played six matches during the season. The highlights of his season were an 85 he scored against New South Wales and a 98 against Victoria, falling just short of scoring a maiden first-class century. Wells was upgraded to a full contract with Tasmania after his debut season, but for the rest of his time with the team he failed to secure a permanent place in the squad. Often he was forced to play for Tasmania's second XI and in grade cricket.

After a few years in the system Wells started to have more success in limited overs cricket. Wells made his Twenty20 debut in the 2010–11 Big Bash for Tasmania, filling in for Tim Paine, and scored 51 not out in his first innings as Tasmania demolished Victoria. He also scored his maiden List A century against Queensland in the 2011–12 Ryobi Cup with 121 not out, helping to secure Tasmania's spot in the tournament's final. Despite his improving form he was dropped from Tasmania's contract list in 2012.

After being cut from Tasmania's list Wells started to make his way back up through the ranks in Twenty20 cricket, playing for the Hobart Hurricanes in the recently created Big Bash League. He established himself as a regular member of the Hurricanes' team during BBL|03, and his form in grade cricket was also exceptional. He won the Emerson Rodwell Medal, Tasmania's grade cricket medal for the best player of the season, after the 2013–14 season. He amassed 752 runs at an average of 72.20 and also bowled well, taking eight wickets. It was the first time he had won the medal after finishing in second place twice before.

Wells had the best season of his career yet in the 2014–15 summer. He made his way back into Tasmania's team and scored a century in a one-day match against Victoria. In BBL|04 he scored half-centuries against both the Melbourne Stars and the Adelaide Strikers with 68 and 58 respectively. He was among Tasmania's best batsmen for the season. He had the team's third best batting average in the Sheffield Shield and was their third-highest run scorer in one day matches. Regardless of his improvement, after playing 35 first-class matches and 26 one-day matches for Tasmania, he was again cut from their contract list. He moved to Western Australia, seeking more opportunities to play first-class and one-day cricket, but he was kept on by the Hurricanes for Twenty20 matches.

=== Western Australia (2015–present) ===
Despite not being contracted to Western Australia in the 2015–16 season, he was named in the squad for the Matador Cup, Australia's one-day tournament, and played two Sheffield Shield matches for the state. He was one of eight players added to Western Australia's contract list for the 2016–17 season after impressing selectors enough in his two Shield matches.

He did not play in the first match of the 2016–17 Sheffield Shield season, but after scoring 153 and 149 not out for Western Australia Under-23s against Victoria Under-23s he was selected for the second Shield match to replace Shaun Marsh, who was on Test duty. In Western Australia's third match he scored 120, his first first-class century, in the second innings, and two matches later he scored 113 not out to take Western Australia to their first victory of the season by eight wickets. He also fired in BBL|06, with 137 runs for the Hurricanes at a strike-rate of 130.47, his best performance coming against the Adelaide Strikers, scoring a quickfire 55 off 37 balls.

Wells signed with the Adelaide Strikers to play for them in BBL|07, his first team change after playing 45 games in six seasons for the Hurricanes. His highlight of the tournament came in a match against the Sydney Sixers when he hit a six a distance of 104 metres, landing the ball on the roof of the O'Reilly stand at the Sydney Cricket Ground. He finished the tournament by winning the final with the Strikers against his former side the Hurricanes and becoming a BBL champion.

Wells improved on his form for the Strikers in BBL|08, scoring 359 runs at an average of 44.88, leading the run scoring for the Strikers in what was an unsuccessful defence of their title from the previous season.

In BBL 09, Wells was linked to a possible selection in Australia's T20I squad after improving yet again, scoring 478 runs at an average of 68.29. He sat fourth on the run scorers table at the conclusion of the season and led the competition for batting average.
