= Big Bash League =

Australian professional Twenty20 cricket franchise league

- Tournament logo
- Countries: Australia
- Administrator: Cricket Australia
- Format: Twenty20
- First edition: 2011–12
- Latest edition: 2025–26
- Next edition: 2026–27
- Tournament format: Double round-robin and Knockout finals
- Number of teams: 8
- Current champion: Perth Scorchers (6th title)
- Most successful: Perth Scorchers (6 titles)
- Most runs: Chris Lynn (4,133)
- Most wickets: Sean Abbott (186)
- TV: Seven Network; Fox Cricket
- Website: www.bigbash.com.au
- 2026–27 Big Bash League season

The Big Bash League (BBL), also known as the KFC Big Bash League for sponsorship reasons, is a professional Twenty20 (T20) cricket league in Australia. Established in 2011 by Cricket Australia, it features eight city-based franchises and is held annually between December and February. In 2016–17, it was one of the two T20 cricket leagues—alongside the Indian Premier League—to feature amongst the top ten domestic sport leagues in average attendance.

The Perth Scorchers are the most successful team in the tournament's history and the most dominant franchise in Australian sport, having won the title six times including consecutively for two years twice. As of 2026, there have been 15 seasons of the tournament. The current champions are the Perth Scorchers, who won the 2025–26 season after defeating the Sydney Sixers by 6 wickets in the final.

== History ==
=== Background ===
Following the creation of the T20 Blast in 2003 and a perceived waning interest in Australian cricket from teenage audiences, Cricket Australia launched the Twenty20 Big Bash in 2005–06. The Twenty20 Big Bash was the first top-level domestic Twenty20 cricket competition in Australia and was contested between the six state-based teams that contested the Sheffield Shield and One-Day Cup. The competition held its last season in 2010–11. In July 2011, Cricket Australia announced the launch of a franchise-based competition, the Big Bash League, as a replacement for the Twenty20 Big Bash League. This competition would have eight, city-based teams, as opposed to the six state-based teams of its predecessor.

=== Trophy ===
A design contest was held in 2011 to determine the design of the Big Bash League trophy. The competition was restricted to Australian designers, with the final design, chosen by the public from a field of three, revealed on 13 December 2011.

=== Expansion proposals ===
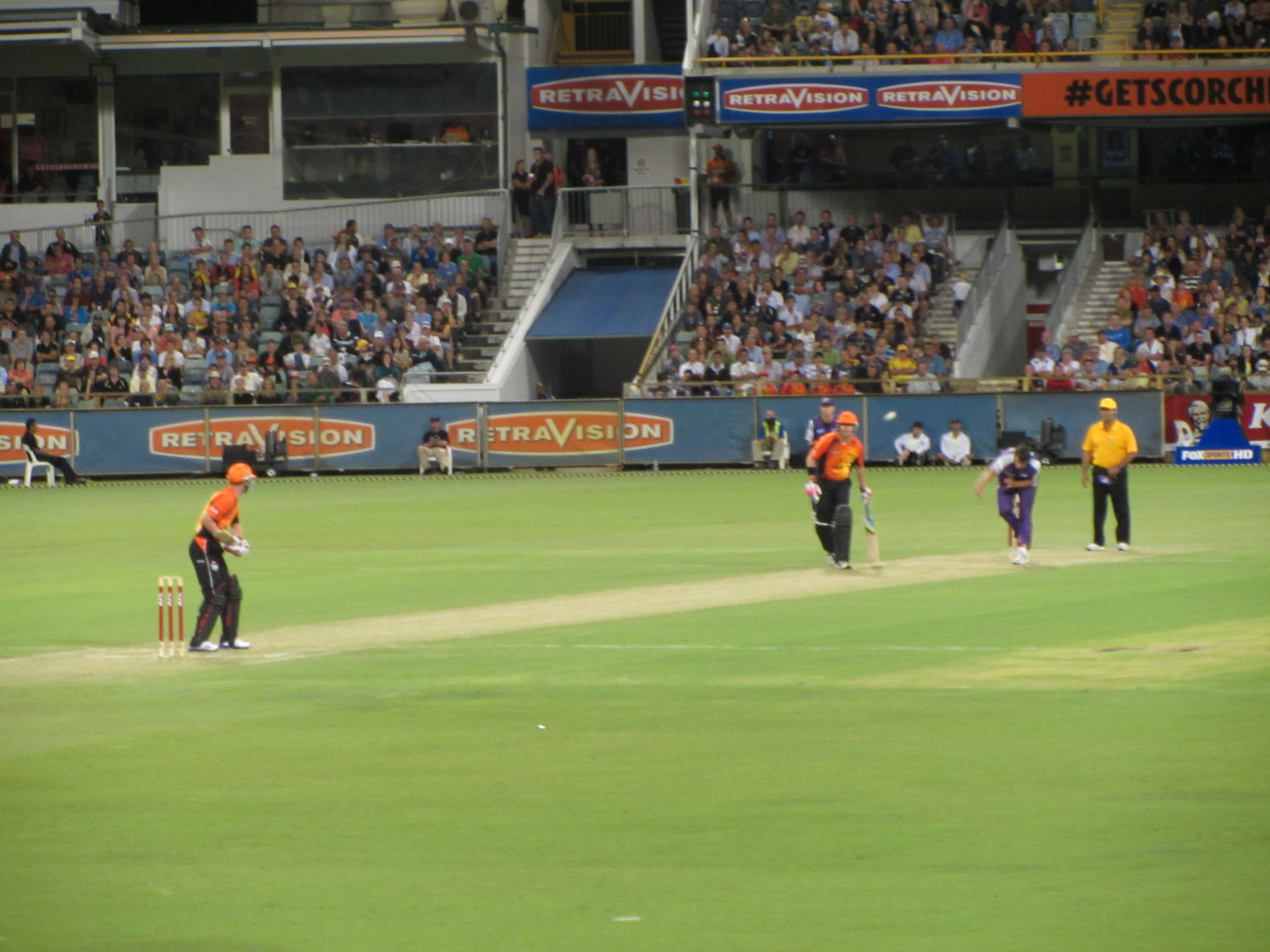
Perth Scorchers taking on Hobart Hurricanes at the WACA in 2011

It had been proposed that the tournament would undergo expansion into more regional areas not supported by international cricket. The expansion was originally planned to be implemented in 2012. The proposed teams included: Newcastle, Canberra, Geelong, and Gold Coast. A New Zealand-based team was also mentioned as a possibility which would be based at Auckland or Christchurch, but this is unlikely to happen. The expansion proposal was suspended, mainly because the proposed cities lacked the proper cricket hosting facilities.

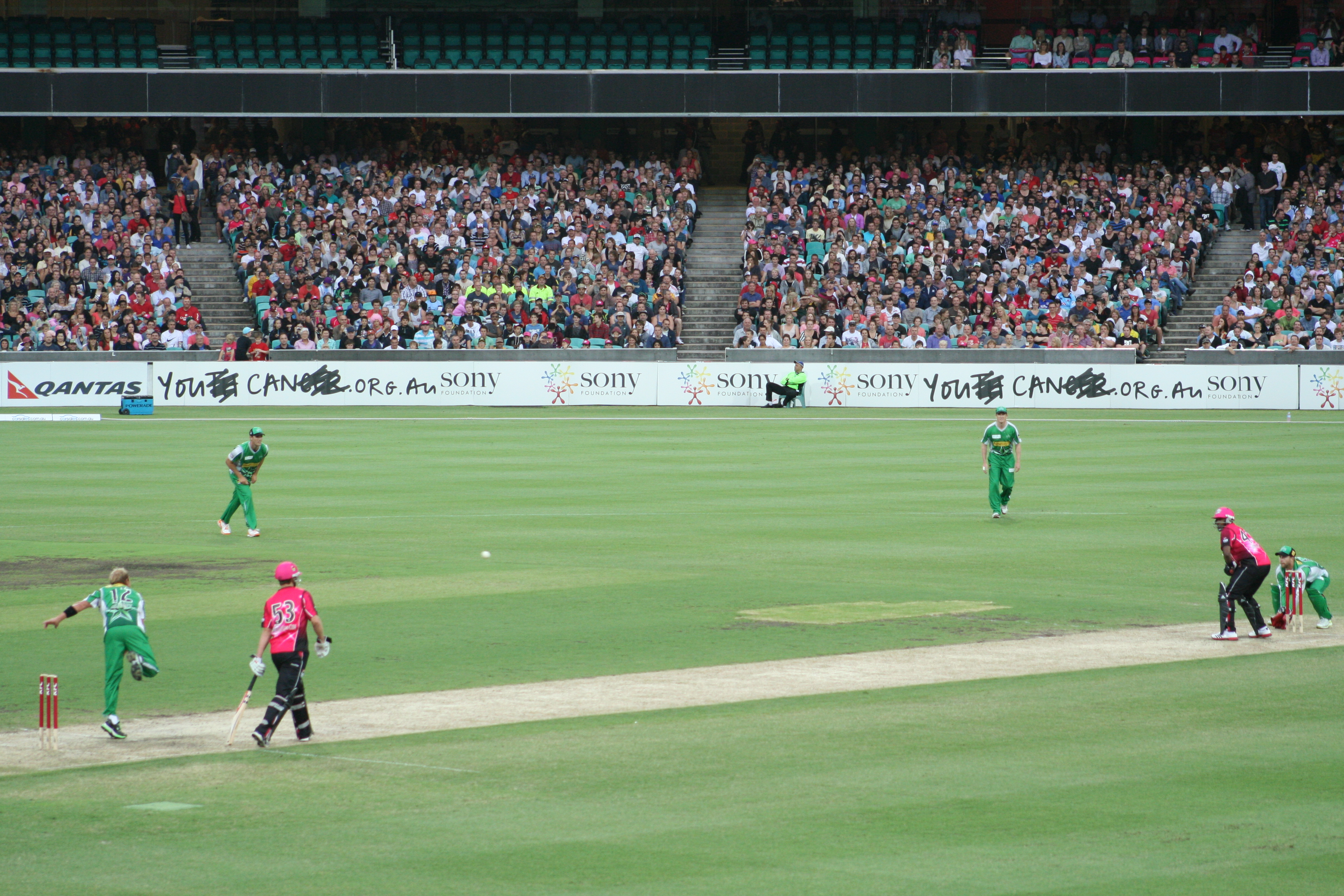
Shane Warne of Melbourne Stars bowling against Sydney Sixers at the SCG in 2011

In 2015, former Black Caps captain and Melbourne Stars coach Stephen Fleming suggested the expansion of the tournament to include New Zealand teams and become a trans-Tasman competition. He said an expansion into New Zealand would be widely supported by locals. His views were also supported by Brisbane Heat coach and former Black Caps captain Daniel Vettori. Melbourne Renegades chief executive Stuart Coventry also stated that he wants Cricket Australia to grant each club a fifth home fixture next season. Coventry said the BBL was ready to expand from 8 to 10 games, and adding matches would further establish the franchises.

In 2016, Anthony Everard, head of the BBL, flagged the league's intentions to approach expansion through a soft launch. He stated the short to medium term goal was to schedule BBL games involving existing franchises in regional markets before potentially adding new teams after the 2017–18 season when the broadcast deal expired. He also indicated the regional markets of Canberra, Geelong, Launceston, Coffs Harbour, Albury, Moe, Cairns, Gold Coast, and Alice Springs will likely host games during the soft launch period. On 27 January 2017, Everard announced an extra eight matches would be added to the 2017–18 season and implored each existing franchise to look at new markets when considering where the extra games would be played, although the lengthened season was not implemented until 2018–19.

In 2018, it was reported that the Gold Coast Suns were interested in securing a Big Bash League franchise if the competition was expanded.

Cricket ACT has campaigned for an expansion team in both the men's and women's competition. In October 2024, Australian Capital Territory Chief Minister Andrew Barr announced as part of his campaign for the 2024 Australian Capital Territory election, that the ACT Government would provide funding for an expansion team in both the men's and women's competitions in partnership with Cricket ACT, if the territory was granted a team. The proposed team would be based at Manuka Oval in Canberra, where the Australian national team have hosted international fixtures. In July 2025, Cricket Australia (CA) CEO Todd Greenburg floated the idea of expanding the competition to New Zealand, following a Boston Consulting Group (BCG) report on improving and innovating the league. ESPN reported in December 2025 that "New Zealand, which boasts teams in many Australian sports leagues, is an obvious first foray abroad [for the BBL]. Its proximity to the east coast of Australia makes it easier from a logistical sense while being attractive to broadcasters. With New Zealand being two hours ahead of Sydney and Melbourne, and five in front of Perth, having triple headers on game days could create a television bonanza." The CA board was reported to also be considering an expansion into Singapore.

=== Women's Big Bash League ===
Former women's Test captain and Head of Brisbane's Centre of Excellence, Belinda Clark, revealed on 19 January 2014 that planning for a women's BBL was in its early stages but could become a reality very soon. She stated that the proposal was being considered due to the huge rise in television ratings during the 2013–14 season, and the rise in women's cricket popularity.

On 19 February 2015, Cricket Australia announced that a Women's Big Bash League (WBBL) would commence in the 2015–16 season, with teams aligned to the men's competition. It was announced that the teams would share the names and colours of the existing men's BBL teams, meaning that there would be two teams from Sydney and Melbourne and one team from Adelaide, Brisbane, Hobart, and Perth.

The inaugural Women's Big Bash League was won by the Sydney Thunder against the Sydney Sixers by 3 wickets. The current champion from the 2022–23 Women's Big Bash League season is Adelaide Strikers who won their maiden WBBL title by defeating Sydney Thunder by 10 runs.

=== Christmas Day match ===
In December 2015, Cricket Australia revealed that they are looking into the possibility of hosting a Christmas Day BBL match in the coming years, possibly after the next season. If the proposal is passed, it would have been a first in the history of Australian sport since no professional matches had played in Australia on Christmas Day at that time. "It is something we have just recently started discussing, the possibilities of that. We're talking about playing a Christmas Eve match, we already play Boxing Day," CA's Executive GM (Operations) Mike McKenna said. This has not yet occurred, but in September 2018, it was reported that Cricket Australia had struck a deal with the Australian Cricketers' Association to play BBL matches on Christmas Day.

== Format ==
=== BBL|01–BBL|08: Knock-out playoff system ===
The first BBL season had 28 group stage matches, before expanding to 32 in the following season. Each team played seven in a round-robin tournament style format, before playing a second team twice, allowing both Sydney and Melbourne teams to play two derbies within a single season. The top four ranked teams then progressed to the semi-finals, played in a knockout style to determine the season champions. The final of the tournament is played at the home ground of the higher-ranked team. The only exception to this rule was 2014–15 season when the final was played at a neutral venue (Manuka Oval), due to the 2015 Cricket World Cup.

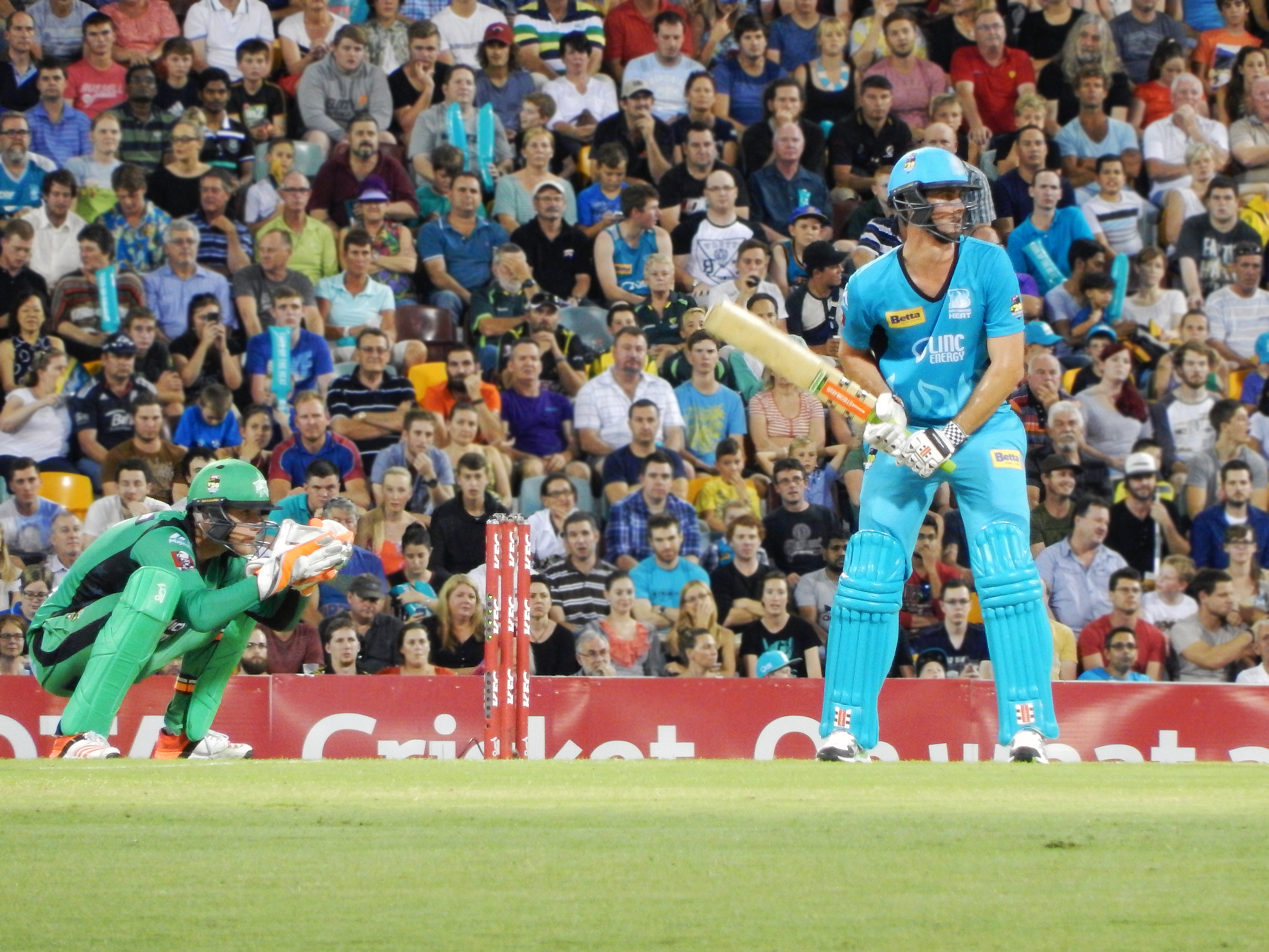
Ben Cutting of Brisbane Heat batting against Melbourne Stars at The Gabba in 2014

Additionally, carrying on from the Twenty20 Big Bash, each season's two finalists used to qualify for the Champions League Twenty20 tournament, an annual international Twenty20 competition played between the top domestic teams from various nations. The tournament became defunct after its 2014 edition.

In the 2017–18 season, the tournament expanded from 32 matches to 40 matches, with each team playing 10 matches before the semi-finals. The season was held over a similar time-frame thus resulting in more doubleheaders (one game afternoon, one game night) and teams playing more regularly.

From the 2018–19 season, each team played all other teams twice during a season, for a total of 56 regular season matches before the finals series. This season also saw the introduction of a 'bat flip' to decide which team would bowl or field first, replacing a traditional coin toss.

=== BBL|09–BBL|12: Five-team playoff system, introduction of the "Power Surge" ===
The finals structure was changed in the 2019–20 season to include a fifth team, and a "double chance" for the top two teams. The structure was a hybrid version of the Page–McIntyre final four system with the addition of 'The Eliminator' being the difference between the original and hybrid versions.

The following season saw the introduction of three new rules:

- the "Power Surge", a two-over period that acted as a second powerplay, forcing a set amount of fielder into the inner circle.
- the "X-Factor player", a player could enter a match after the 10th over of the first innings or later as a replacement for any player who had not yet bat or had bowled no more than one over.
- the "Bash Boost", a bonus point awarded during the second innings based on a target set via the Duckworth–Lewis–Stern method.

The 2022–23 season saw the removal of the "Bash Boost" bonus points and "X-Factor player". In addition to keeping the "Power Surge", the Decision Review System was also implemented, giving teams one review per innings.

=== BBL|13–present: Four-team playoffs return ===
The 2023–24 season was shortened, with each team played ten regular season matches, playing three teams twice, and four teams once; for a total of 40 regular season games and 4 finals. This was in response to concerns that the 61-game season was too long. Furthermore, the league reverted to the top four reaching the playoff stage from the 2023–24 season, but retained the double chance for the top two teams:

- Qualifier – First v Second
- Knockout – Third v Fourth
- Challenger – Loser of the Qualifier v Winner of the Knockout
- Final – Winner of the Qualifier v Winner of the Challenger

== Teams ==
Location of Big Bash League teams

Team	Location	Home ground	Coach	Captain	Owner
Adelaide Strikers	Adelaide, South Australia	Adelaide Oval	Tim Paine	Matt Short	South Australian Cricket Association
Brisbane Heat	Brisbane, Queensland	The Gabba	James Hopes	Usman Khawaja	Queensland Cricket
Hobart Hurricanes	Hobart, Tasmania	Bellerive Oval	Jeff Vaughan	Nathan Ellis	Cricket Tasmania
Melbourne Renegades	Melbourne, Victoria	Melbourne Cricket Ground	Luke Ronchi	Will Sutherland	Cricket Victoria
Melbourne Stars	Melbourne, Victoria	Melbourne Cricket Ground	Cameron White	Marcus Stoinis	Cricket Victoria
Perth Scorchers	Perth, Western Australia	Perth Stadium	Adam Voges	Ashton Turner	WA Cricket
Sydney Sixers	Sydney, New South Wales	Sydney Cricket Ground	Matthew Mott	Moises Henriques	Cricket New South Wales
Sydney Thunder	Sydney, New South Wales	Sydney; Showground Stadium	Andrew Flintoff	David Warner	Cricket New South Wales

The competition features eight city-based franchises, instead of the six state-based teams which had previously competed in the KFC Twenty20 Big Bash. Each state's capital city features one team, with Sydney and Melbourne featuring two. The team names and colours for all teams were officially announced on 6 April 2011.

A single team must have a squad of 18 players, with more allowed to be signed to the team. This squad including a minimum of two rookie contracts. Teams must also sign at least two international players, picked through a draft. Each team can also sign replacement players, in the instance that players from their original 18-player squad are unavailable. Though there is no limit on Australian replacement players, there is a maximum of two overseas replacement players.

Starting, from the 2023–24 season onwards, teams are allowed to sign up to two marquee supplementary players who would not count as part of their regular 18-player squad. These players must be signed to the Australia national cricket team. Additionally, teams are allowed to pre-sign one international player prior to the draft.

== Rivalries ==
Throughout the history of the tournament rivalries have been formed by competition between teams and by teams being in the same city. The Melbourne Derby and Sydney Derby matches are some of the most heavily attended matches during the league and are widely anticipated by the fans.

=== Sydney Smash ===
The Sydney Smash is a game between the Sydney-based teams, the Sydney Sixers and Sydney Thunder. This rivalry was started in the inaugural season due to both teams being from Sydney and being made up of New South Wales cricket team players. The Sixers have won 16 times to the Thunder's 7 but the game still attracts a large crowd for every game.

=== Melbourne Derby ===
The Melbourne Derby took place between the two Melbourne based teams, the Melbourne Renegades and the Melbourne Stars until 2026. This derby was similar in nature to the Sydney Smash as the cores of both teams come from the Victoria cricket team and happened since the inaugural season of the competition until BBL|15. In BBL|05 the game drew the largest crowd for a Big Bash game with 80,883 fans attending the game at the MCG. In 2026, it was announced that Cricket Victoria intends to merge the two teams into one identity, effectively ending the rivalry. Two weeks later, after pushback from other state associations, this move was reversed and the two teams will continue to play as separate entities.

=== Perth Scorchers – Sydney Sixers ===
The Scorchers/Sixers rivalry has developed over the competition's 15 seasons due to their unparalleled success. The Scorchers have won the title six times and Sixers have claimed the trophy three times. The Scorchers and the Sixers have both been runners up three times. They've met in the final on six occasions. The Scorchers have won four of those encounters and the Sixers two.

== Seasons and results ==
The most successful team is the Perth Scorchers, having won six titles, double that of any other team. Every team except the Melbourne Stars have won the title at least once.

Finals summary
Season	Edition	Final			Final host	Final venue	Attendance
Season	Edition	Winner	Result	Runner-up	Final host	Final venue	Attendance
2011–12; Details	BBL|01	Sydney Sixers; 3/158 (18.5 overs)	Sixers won by 7 wickets Scorecard	Perth Scorchers; 5/156 (20 overs)	Perth Scorchers	WACA Ground, Perth	16,255
2012–13; Details	BBL|02	Brisbane Heat; 5/167 (20 overs)	Heat won by 34 runs Scorecard	Perth Scorchers; 9/133 (20 overs)	Perth Scorchers	WACA Ground, Perth	18,517
2013–14; Details	BBL|03	Perth Scorchers; 4/191 (20 overs)	Scorchers won by 39 runs Scorecard	Hobart Hurricanes; 7/152 (20 overs)	Perth Scorchers	WACA Ground, Perth	20,783
2014–15; Details	BBL|04	Perth Scorchers; 6/148 (20 overs)	Scorchers won by 4 wickets Scorecard	Sydney Sixers; 5/147 (20 overs)	Neutral venue	Manuka Oval, Canberra	11,837
2015–16; Details	BBL|05	Sydney Thunder; 7/181 (19.3 overs)	Thunder won by 3 wickets Scorecard	Melbourne Stars; 9/176 (20 overs)	Melbourne Stars	Melbourne Cricket Ground, Melbourne	47,672
2016–17; Details	BBL|06	Perth Scorchers; 1/144 (15.5 overs)	Scorchers won by 9 wickets Scorecard	Sydney Sixers; 9/141 (20 overs)	Perth Scorchers	WACA Ground, Perth	21,832
2017–18; Details	BBL|07	Adelaide Strikers; 2/202 (20 overs)	Strikers won by 25 runs Scorecard	Hobart Hurricanes; 5/177 (20 overs)	Adelaide Strikers	Adelaide Oval, Adelaide	40,732
2018–19; Details	BBL|08	Melbourne Renegades; 5/145 (20 overs)	Renegades won by 13 runs Scorecard	Melbourne Stars; 7/132 (20 overs)	Melbourne Renegades	Docklands Stadium, Melbourne	40,816
2019–20; Details	BBL|09	Sydney Sixers; 5/116 (12 overs)	Sixers won by 19 runs Scorecard	Melbourne Stars; 6/97 (12 overs)	Sydney Sixers	Sydney Cricket Ground, Sydney	10,121
2020–21; Details	BBL|10	Sydney Sixers; 6/188 (20 overs)	Sixers won by 27 runs Scorecard	Perth Scorchers; 9/161 (20 overs)	Sydney Sixers	Sydney Cricket Ground, Sydney	25,295
2021–22; Details	BBL|11	Perth Scorchers; 6/171 (20 overs)	Scorchers won by 79 runs Scorecard	Sydney Sixers; 92 (16.2 overs)	Neutral venue	Docklands Stadium, Melbourne	10,333
2022–23; Details	BBL|12	Perth Scorchers; 5/178 (19.2 overs)	Scorchers won by 5 wickets Scorecard	Brisbane Heat; 7/175 (20 overs)	Perth Scorchers	Perth Stadium, Perth	53,886
2023–24; Details	BBL|13	Brisbane Heat; 8/166 (20 overs)	Heat won by 54 runs Scorecard	Sydney Sixers; 112 (17.3 overs)	Sydney Sixers	Sydney Cricket Ground, Sydney	43,153
2024–25; Details	BBL|14	Hobart Hurricanes; 3/185 (14.1 overs)	Hurricanes won by 7 wickets Scorecard	Sydney Thunder; 7/182 (20 overs)	Hobart Hurricanes	Bellerive Oval, Hobart	15,706
2025–26; Details	BBL|15	Perth Scorchers; 4/133 (17.3 overs)	Scorchers won by 6 wickets Scorecard	Sydney Sixers; 132 (20 overs)	Perth Scorchers	Perth Stadium, Perth	55,018

=== Team summary by season ===
Team	2011–12	2012–13	2013–14	2014–15	2015–16	2016–17	2017–18	2018–19	2019–20	2020–21	2021–22	2022–23	2023–24	2024–25	2025–26
Adelaide Strikers	6th	5th	7th	1st (SF)	1st (SF)	6th	2nd (C)	7th	3rd (KF)	5th (EF)	4th (CF)	7th	4th (CF)	8th	6th
Brisbane Heat	5th	4th (C)	5th	8th	6th	2nd (SF)	7th	5th	7th	4th (CF)	7th	5th (RU)	1st (C)	7th	5th
Hobart Hurricanes	2nd (SF)	6th	4th (RU)	5th	7th	7th	4th (RU)	1st (SF)	4th (EF)	6th	5th (EF)	6th	5th	1st (C)	3rd (CF)
Melbourne Renegades	7th	1st (SF)	6th	6th	5th	5th	3rd (SF)	2nd (C)	8th	8th	8th	3rd (KF)	7th	6th	7th
Melbourne Stars	4th (SF)	3rd (SF)	1st (SF)	3rd (SF)	2nd (RU)	4th (SF)	8th	4th (RU)	1st (RU)	7th	6th	8th	6th	4th (KF)	4th (KF)
Perth Scorchers	1st (RU)	2nd (RU)	3rd (C)	2nd (C)	3rd (SF)	1st (C)	1st (SF)	8th	6th	2nd (RU)	1st (C)	1st (C)	3rd (KF)	5th	1st (C)
Sydney Sixers	3rd (C)	7th	2nd (SF)	4th (RU)	8th	3rd (RU)	5th	3rd (SF)	2nd (C)	1st (C)	2nd (RU)	2nd (CF)	2nd (RU)	2nd (CF)	2nd (RU)
Sydney Thunder	8th	8th	8th	7th	4th (C)	8th	6th	6th	5th (CF)	3rd (KF)	3rd (KF)	4th (EF)	8th	3rd (RU)	8th

=== Champions ===
Team	Total	Winning season(s)
Perth Scorchers	6	BBL|03, BBL|04, BBL|06, BBL|11, BBL|12, BBL|15
Sydney Sixers	3	BBL|01, BBL|09, BBL|10
Brisbane Heat	2	BBL|02, BBL|13
Hobart Hurricanes	1	BBL|14
Melbourne Renegades	1	BBL|08
Adelaide Strikers	1	BBL|07
Sydney Thunder	1	BBL|05
Melbourne Stars	—N/a	

=== Wooden Spoons ===
The wooden spoon in Big Bash League is a colloquial term for the team that finishes the season at the bottom of the table. The Hobart Hurricanes are the only team to never win the wooden spoon.

Team	Total	Wooden spoon season(s)
Sydney Thunder	6	BBL|01, BBL|02, BBL|03, BBL|06, BBL|13, BBL|15
Melbourne Renegades	3	BBL|09, BBL|10, BBL|11
Melbourne Stars	2	BBL|07, BBL|12
Brisbane Heat	1	BBL|04
Sydney Sixers	1	BBL|05
Perth Scorchers	1	BBL|08
Adelaide Strikers	1	BBL|14
Hobart Hurricanes	—N/a	

== Salary cap ==
The salary cap was initially $1 million, and increased to $1.05 million for the third season. In February 2015, the salary cap increased to $1.3 million for the fifth season, and to $1.6 million for the sixth season.

In 2023–24 the cap was at $3 million AUD, with the ability to also have 2 players paid outside the cap.

== Prize money ==
Cricket Australia increased the prize money for the BBL to a total of A$890,000 for the four finalists from 2015–16 season, after the Champions League Twenty20 tournament was discontinued with effect from 2015. As of 2016, prize money is split between the teams as follows:

- $20,000 – To the team that finishes fifth in the season
- $80,000 – To each losing semi-finalist
- $260,000 – To the Runner-up of the season
- $450,000 – To the Champion of the season

However, the additional cash increase of $600,000 will go to successful clubs and not their players. Up to the 2014–15 BBL season, a total prize money of $290,000 was awarded.

== Audience ==
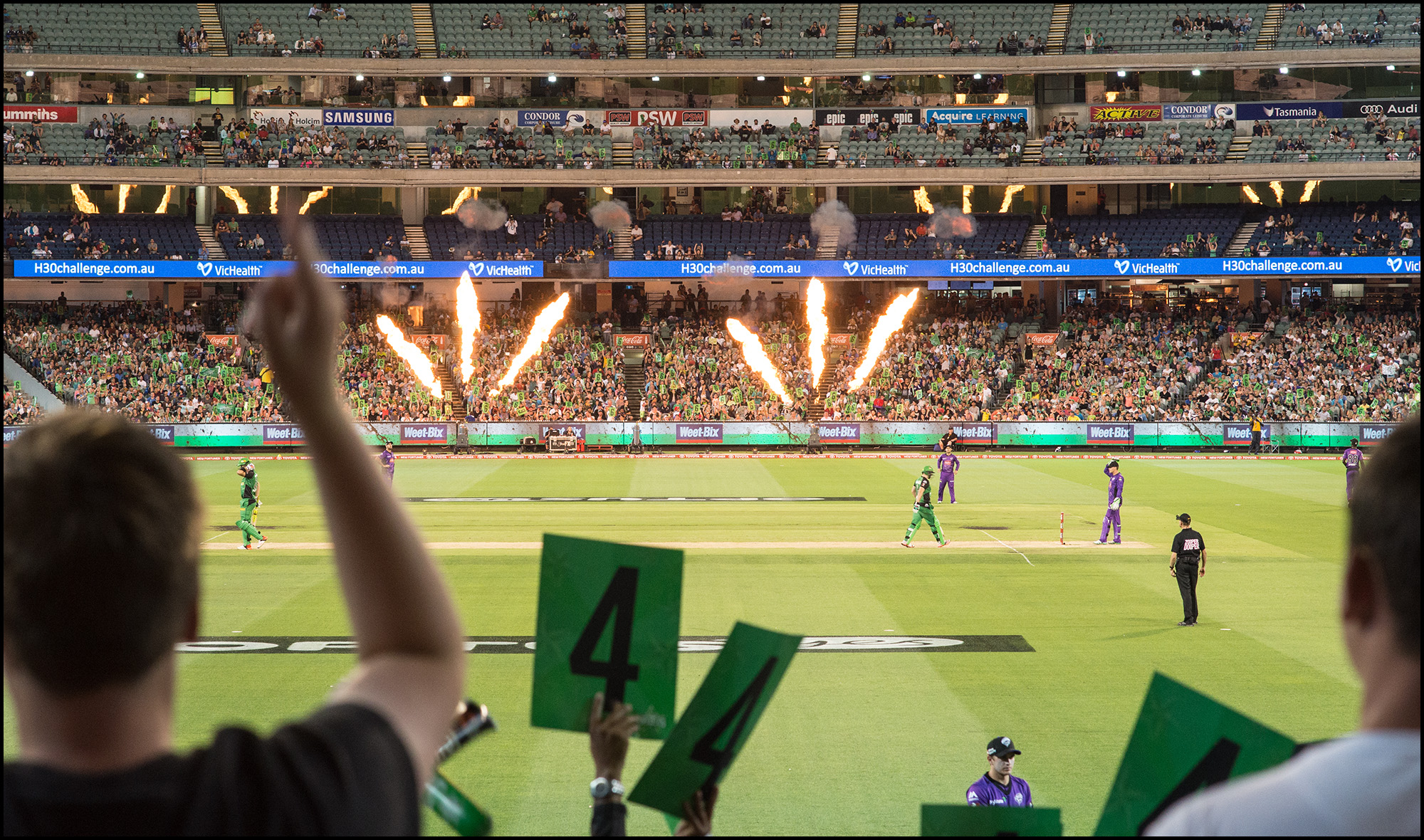
Melbourne Stars vs Hobart Hurricanes at the MCG in 2016

Average home crowds for the season are listed below. These figures include finals matches. The figures for the whole season average include the finals. Post-Christmas matches have historically been the highest attended period for the League. BBL has provided a platform to create interest in playing cricket among younger children, due to its big hitting, high scoring and entertaining nature of the game.

The 2014–15 season saw record domestic cricket crowds in the states of South Australia, New South Wales, Tasmania and the ACT, including a record attendance of 52,633 at the Adelaide Strikers' home semi-final, which was then the biggest ever crowd at the redeveloped Adelaide Oval.

In the 2015–16 season, attendance figure records continued to be broken across all the venues. Perth Scorchers became the first ever BBL team to sell out all of its home matches in a season. On 2 January 2016, the BBL single match attendance record was surpassed, with a crowd of 80,883 watching the first of two Melbourne derbies between the Melbourne Stars and the Melbourne Renegades at the Melbourne Cricket Ground. The Big Bash League also entered the top 10 most attended sports leagues in the world with respect to average crowd per match in this season.

Home crowd averages (BBL|01–BBL|10)
Team	2011–12	2012–13	2013–14	2014–15	2015–16	2016–17	2017–18	2018–19	2019–20	2020–21*	Average
**Adelaide Strikers**	21,950	13,319	23,704	**39,295**	**43,689**	**41,342**	**35,247**	28,095	25,143	10,693	28,248
**Brisbane Heat**	17,072	15,897	**23,708**	24,701	29,353	34,375	32,980	22,343	23,167	12,693	23,629
**Hobart Hurricanes**	11,251	12,107	9,552	13,776	16,640	17,570	13,536	11,348	8,299	5,146	11,923
**Melbourne Renegades**	13,324	13,804	21,929	22,301	29,010	30,033	28,315	21,703	15,528	7,814	20,376
**Melbourne Stars**	**27,424**	**21,426**	19,951	27,698	40,298	49,578	31,628	21,541	21,447	9,300	27,029
**Perth Scorchers**	15,239	13,762	18,061	18,918	20,273	20,679	26,725	**30,133**	**26,586**	**16,952**	20,733
**Sydney Sixers**	20,092	13,286	18,446	23,842	27,956	30,368	24,815	17,798	16,995	3,017	19,662
**Sydney Thunder**	18,423	10,278	14,866	17,938	19,333	20,688	15,432	12,461	10,888	4,177	14,448
Finals	15,222	17,568	15,286	27,888	42,182	25,642	43,334	22,854	12,691	25,295	24,726
Season average	17,749	14,196	18,781	23,538	29,443	30,122	26,528	20,554	18,520	8,992	20,842

Home crowd averages (BBL|11–present)
Team	2021–22*	2022–23	2023–24	2024–25	2025–26	Average
**Adelaide Strikers**	5,931	21,105	28,616	28,593	26,898	22,229
**Brisbane Heat**	8,751	16,699	19,570	26,593	30,023	20,327
**Hobart Hurricanes**	4,218	7,068	7,982	9,459	8,818	7,509
**Melbourne Renegades**	7,361	11,809	21,164	21,528	21,403	16,653
**Melbourne Stars**	9,678	16,320	20,690	24,401	27,570	19,732
**Perth Scorchers**	**16,108**	**31,160**	**31,144**	**38,507**	**38,947**	31,173
**Sydney Sixers**	10,470	16,969	23,713	26,515	26,031	20,740
**Sydney Thunder**	7,345	10,111	13,982	12,353	13,436	11,445
Finals	5,632	25,726	25,756	18,503	39,309	22,985
Season average	7,371	16,720	21,505	22,825	24,748	19,199

Key

- **Bold** denotes the team which had the highest average attendance for that season
- Italics denotes that the season is still in progress, and that numbers are not final
- * denotes seasons which were impacted by COVID-19

=== Television audiences ===
BBL games are currently broadcast in Australia on free-to-air television by the Seven Network and subscription television by Fox Cricket. The Seven Network broadcasts 45 of 61 Matches including the Finals Series. Fox Cricket televises all 61 Matches including 16 Matches exclusively in 4K.

The rights were previously held by Network 10, who in 2013 paid $100 million for BBL rights over five years, marking the channel's first foray in elite cricket coverage. Network 10's BBL coverage became a regular feature of Australian summers and attracted an average audience of more than 943,000 people nationally in 2014–15 season, including a peak audience of 1.9 million viewers for the final between the Scorchers and Sixers.

The 2015–16 season attracted an average audience of 1.13 million for each match in Australia this season, an 18% increase over the previous season. A cumulative audience of 9.65 million watched the matches in Australia, out of which 39% were women. The opening Sydney Derby match of the season attracted a peak audience of 1.53 million. The last group match between Renegades and Strikers in Season 2 was watched by an average audience of 1.36 million, which peaked at 1.67 million. The BBL Final was watched by an average audience of 1.79 million, which peaked at 2.24 million viewers. This was the first time that the ratings for a BBL match crossed the 2 million mark. The KFC BBL|10 Final reached 2.5 million viewers on Seven and 669,000 on Foxtel, capping an extraordinary season in which players, officials, staff and broadcast partners successfully navigated through the many challenges presented by the COVID-19 pandemic.

== Grounds ==
A total of 17 grounds have been used to host BBL matches to date. Sydney Thunder moved out of ANZ Stadium after the 2014–15 season and relocated to Sydney Showground Stadium for the next 10 years. From 2020, the tournament Final has been played at the home ground of the team that wins 'The Qualifier', a playoff match contested between the 2 teams finishing 1st and 2nd in the League. The WACA Ground has hosted the final 4 times, more times than any other venue. Manuka Oval hosted the final of 2014–15 BBL season as a neutral venue primarily because other major grounds were being prepared for the 2015 Cricket World Cup.

Perth Stadium replaced the WACA Ground as the home ground of Perth Scorchers starting with the 2017–18 BBL semi-finals. Perth's home match against Hobart Hurricanes (and a doubleheader WBBL match featuring the Perth Scorchers and Sydney Thunder) became only the second public event at the new stadium.

In September 2017, the Adelaide Strikers agreed to play one home BBL and WBBL match at Traeger Park in Alice Springs over the course of the 2017–18 season. In 2018, they announced that one BBL and two WBBL matches would be held at Traeger Park for the 2018–19 and 2019–20 seasons.

From 2017–18 to 2022–23, the Melbourne Renegades played two matches per season at Kardinia Park in Geelong, Victoria and the Hobart Hurricanes play multiple games at UTAS Stadium in Launceston, Tasmania. The Melbourne Stars would play at least one home match at a secondary venue, often the Citi Power Centre, Melbourne or Manuka Oval in Canberra, ACT, or People First Stadium in the Gold Coast. The Sydney Sixers played two games at Coffs Harbour International Stadium in Coffs Harbour, New South Wales each season, while the Sydney Thunder played two home matches at Manuka Oval, Canberra.

Due to a shorter tournament format being introduced for the 2023–24 season and beyond, The Melbourne Stars, Melbourne Renegades, Sydney Sixers, and Sydney Thunder each reduced playing two home games at secondary venues to one match. The Melbourne Stars play one home match at either Lavington Sports Ground in Albury, New South Wales, or Manuka Oval in Canberra, ACT. The Melbourne Renegades play one home match at Kardinia Park in Geelong, Victoria. The Sydney Sixers play one of their home matches at Coffs Harbour International Stadium in Coffs Harbour, New South Wales, while cross town rivals Sydney Thunder play one match at Manuka Oval in Canberra, ACT. The main reason behind this is because they play an extra match in their home city each year when they play an "away game" against their cross town rivals. This allows fairness across the competition meaning each team plays an equal number of games in their home city each year, while allowing the game to progress and be reached in other areas.

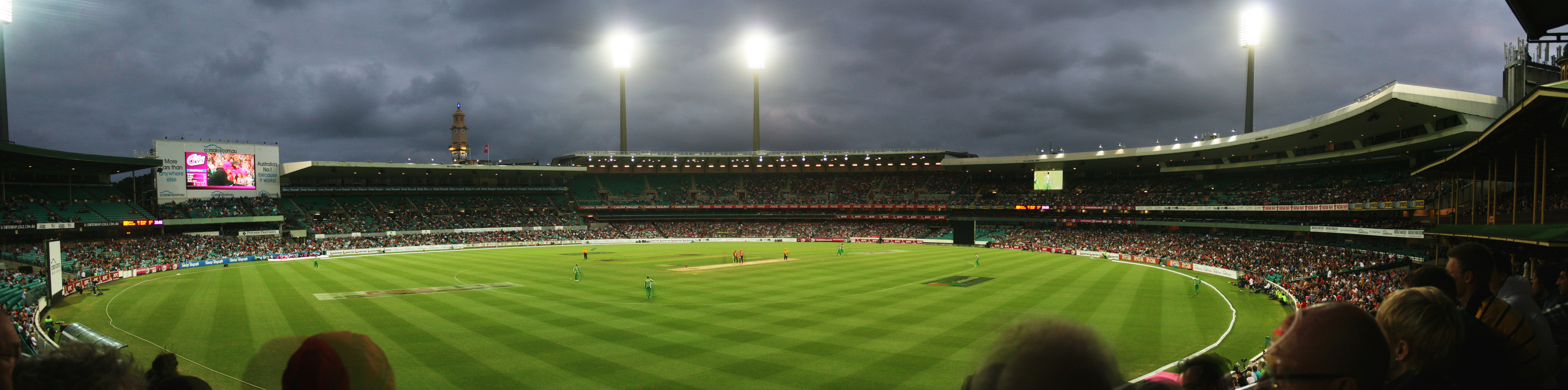
Panoramic view of the SCG during a Big Bash League match in 2011. It is the home ground of Sydney Sixers.

Stadium	Capacity	City	Home team
Current Grounds
Melbourne Cricket Ground	100,024	Melbourne	Melbourne Renegades; Melbourne Stars
Perth Stadium	60,000	Perth	Perth Scorchers
Adelaide Oval	53,583	Adelaide	Adelaide Strikers
Sydney Cricket Ground	48,000	Sydney	Sydney Sixers
The Gabba	42,000	Brisbane	Brisbane Heat
Engie Stadium	22,000	Sydney	Sydney Thunder
Ninja Stadium	20,000	Hobart	Hobart Hurricanes
Secondary Grounds
GMHBA Stadium	40,000	Geelong	Melbourne Renegades
People First Stadium	25,000	Gold Coast	Brisbane Heat; Melbourne Stars
UTAS Stadium	21,000	Launceston	Hobart Hurricanes
Coffs Harbour International Stadium	20,000	Coffs Harbour	Sydney Sixers
Cazalys Stadium	13,500	Cairns	Brisbane Heat
Corroboree Group Oval	12,000	Canberra	Sydney Thunder
Lavington Sports Ground	12,000	Albury	Sydney Thunder; Melbourne Stars
Traeger Park	10,000	Alice Springs	Hobart Hurricanes; Adelaide Strikers
Ted Summerton Reserve	7,500	Moe	Melbourne Stars
Citi Power Centre	7,000	Melbourne	Melbourne Stars
Former Grounds
Accor Stadium	82,000	Sydney	Sydney Thunder (2011–2014)
WACA Ground	20,000	Perth	Perth Scorchers (2011–2018)
Marvel Stadium	53,359	Melbourne	Melbourne Renegades (2011–2026)

== Records and statistics ==
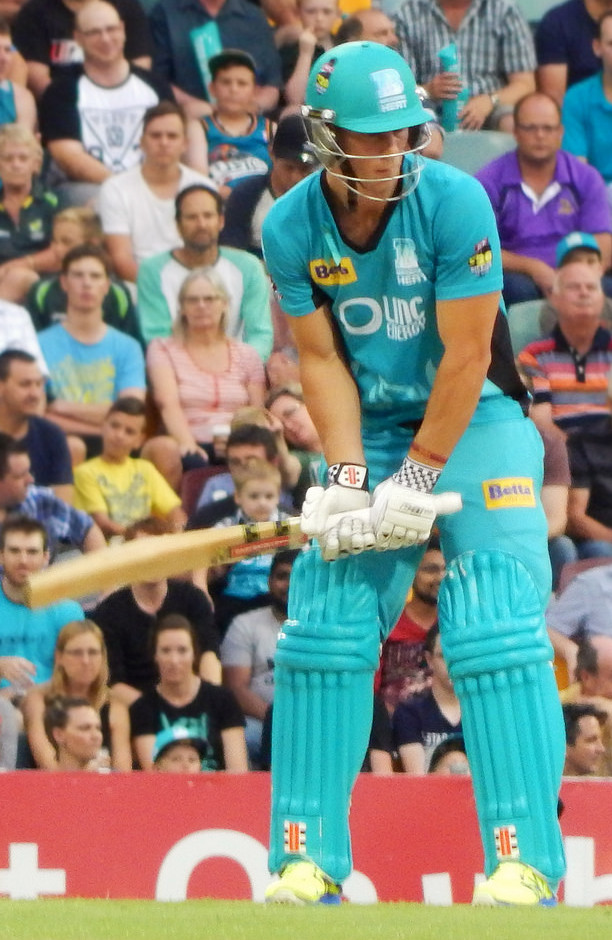
Chris Lynn has scored the most career runs in the Big Bash League.

Here is a list of Big Bash League records. All records are based on statistics at espncricinfo.com. Chris Lynn, who currently plays for the Adelaide Strikers, holds the record of scoring most runs in the league. Sean Abbott, who currently plays for the Sydney Sixers, has taken the most wickets of any bowler.

As of 25 January 2026

Batting records
Most runs	Chris Lynn	4,133
Highest score	Glenn Maxwell	154* vs Hobart Hurricanes (19 January 2022)
Highest partnership	Matt Renshaw & Jack Wildermuth	212 vs Perth Scorchers (19 December 2025)
Bowling records
Most wickets	Sean Abbott	186
Best bowling figures	Lasith Malinga	6/7 vs Perth Scorchers (12 December 2012)
Fielding
Most dismissals (wicket-keeper)	Josh Philippe	110
Most catches (fielder)	Glenn Maxwell	97
Team records
Highest total	Melbourne Stars	2/273 (20.0) vs Hobart Hurricanes (19 January 2022)
Lowest total	Sydney Thunder	15 (5.5) vs Adelaide Strikers (16 December 2022)
Individual records
Most championships	Ashton Turner; Ashton Agar	6
Most championships as captain	Ashton Turner	3
Most matches	Moises Henriques	154
Most matches as captain	Moises Henriques	129

== See also ==
- The Big Appeal
- Women's Big Bash League
- List of Big Bash League centuries
- List of Big Bash League five-wicket hauls
- Twenty20 Big Bash
