= 2011–12 Sheffield Shield season =

Australian cricket tournament

2011–12 Sheffield Shield
- Sheffield Shield logo
- Administrator: Cricket Australia
- Cricket format: First-class
- Tournament format: Double round-robin
- Champions: Queensland (7th title)
- Participants: 6
- Matches: 30, plus final
- Player of the series: Jackson Bird (Tasmania)
- Most runs: Ed Cowan (Tasmania) – 948 runs
- Most wickets: Jackson Bird (Tasmania) – 53 wickets

The 2011–12 Sheffield Shield season is the 110th season of the Sheffield Shield, the first-class Australian domestic cricket competition. . The season began on 11 October 2011, with Queensland playing Victoria, and concluded on 19 March 2012 with the top two teams playing off in the final.

== Teams ==
Club	Home ground	Coach	Captain
New South Wales	Sydney Cricket Ground^{[a]}	Anthony Stuart	Steve O'Keefe
Queensland	Brisbane Cricket Ground	Darren Lehmann	James Hopes
South Australia	Adelaide Oval	Darren Berry	Michael Klinger
Tasmania	Bellerive Oval	Tim Coyle	George Bailey
Victoria	Melbourne Cricket Ground	Greg Shipperd	Cameron White
Western Australia	WACA Ground	Mickey Arthur	Marcus North

- ^{a} New South Wales will also host one match at Bankstown Oval in Sydney and Manuka Oval in Canberra.

== Table ==
The top two teams after the conclusion of the regular season competed in the Sheffield Shield final. Due to finishing first on the points table, Queensland won the right to host the final at their home ground, The Gabba. For an explanation of how points are awarded, see Sheffield Shield points system.

Team	Pld	W	L	D	T	Pts	Quot
Queensland	10	6	2	2	0	36	1.167
Tasmania	10	5	3	2	0	36	1.198
Victoria	10	5	3	2	0	36	1.164
Western Australia	10	5	4	1	0	34	1.176
New South Wales	10	1	4	5	0	12	0.773
South Australia	10	0	6	4	0	2	0.624

Updated to completion of season.

== Fixtures ==
Correct as of 21 March 2012. Source

=== October ===
11–14 October 2011
Scorecard

(H) Queensland	v	Victoria
355 (108.5 overs); AW Robinson 78 (130 balls); DJ Pattinson 3/75 (17.5 overs)		298 (105.3 overs); CJL Rogers 72 (109 balls); BCJ Cutting 4/50 (29 overs)
9/243 dec. (81 overs); PJ Forrest 101 (210 balls); PM Siddle 2/30 (14 overs)		234 (77.3 overs); RJ Quiney 109 (142 balls); CJ Boyce 4/78 (21.3 overs)

Queensland won by 66 runs
Brisbane Cricket Ground
Umpires: Bruce Oxenford and Simon Fry
Player of the match: Andrew Robinson (Queensland)

- Queensland won the toss and elected to bat.

11–14 October 2011
Scorecard

(H) Western Australia	v	Tasmania
176 (53 overs); AC Voges 58 (92 balls); LR Butterworth 4/34 (13 overs)		206 (56.4 overs); GJ Bailey 49 (88 balls); MG Hogan 5/30 (19.4 overs)
4/437 dec. (150 overs); AC Voges 150* (298 balls); XJ Doherty 2/121 (35 overs)		382 (105.1 overs); GJ Bailey 116 (270 balls); MG Johnson 5/69 (29 overs)

Western Australia won by 25 runs
WACA Ground, Perth
Umpires: Mick Martell & John Ward
Player of the match: Adam Voges (Western Australia)

- Western Australia won the toss and elected to bat.

17–20 October 2011
Scorecard

(H) South Australia	v	New South Wales
9/478 dec. (133 overs); DT Christian 131* (168 balls); MA Starc 3/126 (28 overs)		255 (78 overs); PM Nevill 82 (166 balls); PR George 5/36 (16 overs)
		5/402 (137.4 overs) f/o UT Khawaja 101 (229 balls); GD Putland 2/56 (25 overs)

Match drawn
Adelaide Oval
Umpires: Ashley Barrow and Geoff Joshua
Player of the match: Peter George (South Australia)

- South Australia won the toss and elected to bat.

25–28 October 2011
Scorecard

(H) New South Wales	v	Victoria
201 (74.2 overs); MC Henriques 68 (130 balls); JM Herrick 5/79 (24 overs)		427 (120.1 overs); CJL Rogers 106 (172 balls); SM Katich 3/43 (15 overs)
7/433 dec. (116 overs); BJ Rohrer 114 (144 balls); JM Holland 3/118 (37 overs)

Match drawn
Sydney Cricket Ground
Umpires: Ian Lock and John Ward
Player of the match: Ben Rohrer (New South Wales)

- New South Wales won the toss and elected to bat.

25–27 October 2011
Scorecard

(H) Queensland	v	Tasmania
287 (94.5 overs); WJ Townsend 82 (194 balls); BW Hilfenhaus 4/57 (23 overs)		129 (49.5 overs); GJ Bailey 28 (66 balls); NJ Reardon 3/14 (5.5 overs)
		130 (59.4 overs) f/o JJ Krejza 42* (63 overs); RJ Harris 7/60 (21.4 overs)

Queensland won by an innings and 28 runs
Brisbane Cricket Ground
Umpires: Bob Parry and Tony Ward
Player of the match: Ryan Harris (Queensland)

- Queensland won the toss and elected to bat.

25–28 October 2011
Scorecard

Western Australia	v	South Australia (H)
335 (109.4 overs); MJ North 119 (169 balls); GD Putland 5/71 (28 overs)		225 (79.1 overs); DJ Harris 65 (102 balls); MG Hogan 3/45 (20 overs)
7/242 dec. (83 overs); LM Davis 93 (233 balls); GD Putland 3/41 (14 overs)		9/119 (76 overs); M Klinger 38 (128 overs); NM Coulter-Nile 4/46 (23 overs)

Match drawn
Adelaide Oval
Umpires: Gerard Abood and Paul Wilson
Player of the match: Liam Davis (Western Australia)

- Western Australia won the toss and elected to bat.

=== November ===
1–4 November 2011
Scorecard

Queensland	v	Western Australia (H)
273 (72 overs); SJ Paulsen 90* (119 balls); MR Marsh 6/84 (15 overs)		221 (65.1 overs); MA Johnson 53 (84 balls); MG Gale 4/93 (17 overs)
9/341 dec. (104.3 overs); RA Broad 135 (225 balls); MR Marsh 3/72 (25 overs)		201 (62.1 overs); MS Harris 91* (181 overs); BCJ Cutting 5/43 (14 overs)

Queensland won by 192 runs
WACA Ground
Umpires: Mick Martell and Paul Reiffel
Player of the match: Ryan Broad (Queensland)

- Western Australia won the toss and elected to field.

4–7 November 2011
Scorecard

Victoria	v	Tasmania (H)
362 (122.1 overs); MS Wade 108 (210 balls); EP Gulbis 3/50 (13.1 overs)		235 (92.2 overs); AJ Doolan 74 (130 balls); JM Herrick 4/59 (19 overs)
190 (58.5 overs); MS Wade 80 (162 overs); BW Hilfenhaus 5/44 (16 overs)		262 (100.2 overs); SJ Cazzulino 95 (255 balls); GJ Maxwell 3/36 (16 overs)

Victoria won by 55 runs
Melbourne Cricket Ground
Umpires: Simon Fry and Geoff Joshua
Player of the match: Matthew Wade (Victoria)

- Victoria won the toss and elected to bat.

6–9 November 2011
Scorecard

(H) New South Wales	v	South Australia
6/474 dec. (117.1 overs); DA Warner 148 (185 balls); PR George 3/126 (31 overs)		266 (86 overs); TLW Cooper 98 (167 balls); SM Katich 3/29 (10 overs)
		5/373 (115 overs) f/o TLW Cooper 203* (291 balls); JR Hazlewood 2/44 (22 overs)

Match drawn
Bankstown Oval
Umpires: Bob Parry and Tony Ward
Player of the match: Tom Cooper (South Australia)

- New South Wales won the toss and elected to bat.

11–14 November 2011
Scorecard

(H) Victoria	v	Western Australia
301 (87.1 overs); RJ Quiney 92 (129 balls); JP Behrendorff 4/76 (23 overs)		218 (80 overs); TR Birt 63 (102 balls); JL Pattinson 3/27 (16 overs)
278 (87 overs); GJ Maxwell 72 (120 balls); MR Marsh 3/37 (11 overs)		5/363 (106.5 overs); LM Davis 108 (235 balls); SM Boland 1/41 (13 overs)

Western Australia won by 5 wickets
Melbourne Cricket Ground
Umpires: Ashley Barrow and Ian Lock
Player of the match: Liam Davis (Western Australia)

- Western Australia won the toss and elected to field.

15–18 November 2011
Scorecard

(H) Tasmania	v	South Australia
361 (116 overs); JP Faulkner 77 (123 balls); PR George 4/112 (31 overs)		260 (87.3 overs); M Klinger 86 (127 balls); BW Hilfenhaus 4/60 (21.3 overs)
2/300 dec. (87 overs); EJM Cowan 134* (209 balls); CJ Sayers 1/41 (17 overs)		219 (78.5 overs); DJ Harris 50 (98 balls); XJ Doherty 4/27 (15 overs)

Tasmania won by 182 runs
Melbourne Cricket Ground
Umpires: Paul Reiffel and Paul Wilson
Player of the match: George Bailey (Tasmania)

- South Australia won the toss and elected to field.

15–18 November 2011
Scorecard

(H) Queensland	v	New South Wales
282 (85 overs); BJ Cutting 58 (51 balls); MA Starc 5/66 (18 overs)		277 (90.2 overs); PM Nevill 69 (131 balls); CJ Boyce 3/23 (11 overs)
218 (87.5 overs); JR Hopes 72 (84 balls); SJ O'Keefe 4/66 (34 overs)		209 (57 overs); SJ O'Keefe 82 (81 balls); BJ Cutting 4/34 (12 overs)

Queensland won by 14 runs
Brisbane Cricket Ground
Umpires: Simon Fry and Sam Nogajski
Player of the match: Ben Cutting (Queensland)

- Queensland won the toss and elected to bat.

22–25 November 2011
Scorecard

Tasmania	v	Victoria (H)
217 (84.2 overs); MJ Johnston 59 (120 balls); CJ McKay 6/40 (18.2 overs)		94 (38.3 overs); RJ Quiney 33 (72 balls); JM Bird 5/35 (13 overs)
288 (77 overs); TIF Triffitt 70 (68 balls); JM Herrick 4/101 (23 overs)		318 (112.1 overs); CJL Rogers 118 (269 balls); JM Bird 5/61 (28 overs)

Tasmania won by 93 runs
Melbourne Cricket Ground
Umpires: Gerard Abood and Bob Parry
Player of the match: Jackson Bird (Tasmania)

- Tasmania won the toss and elected to bat.

25–28 November 2011
Scorecard

Western Australia	v	New South Wales (H)
150 (60.5 overs); WM Robinson 52 (152 balls); JR Hazlewood 4/51 (19.5 overs)		6/441 dec. (118.5 overs); KR Patterson 157 (189 balls); NJ Rimmington 3/75 (29.5 overs)
365 (114.4 overs); NJ Rimmington 102* (157 balls); JR Hazlewood 4/111 (31.4 overs)		4/78 (13.2 overs); TD Cruickshank 33* (33 balls); MG Hogan 2/29 (5 overs)

New South Wales won by 6 wickets
Sydney Cricket Ground
Umpires: Geoff Joshua and Paul Wilson
Player of the match: Kurtis Patterson (New South Wales)

- New South Wales won the toss and elected to field.

25–28 November 2011
Scorecard

(H) South Australia	v	Queensland
9/349 dec. (114.4 overs); DT Christian 108 (211 balls); MG Gale 5/81 (26.4 overs)		3/350 dec. (120.4 overs); WJ Townsend 166* (379 balls); DT Christian 1/54 (23 overs)
9/260 dec. (54 overs); CJ Ferguson 62 (82 balls); CJ Boyce 5/110 (18 overs)		6/260 (61.3 overs); JA Burns 74 (125 balls); DT Christian 3/67 (20 overs)

Queensland won by 4 wickets
Adelaide Oval
Umpires: Chris Gaffaney and Ian Lock
Player of the match: Wade Townsend (Queensland)

- South Australia won the toss and elected to bat.

=== December ===
2–5 December 2011
Scorecard

(H) Victoria	v	Queensland
7/498 dec. (128.4 overs); DJ Hussey 130 (178 balls); NJ Reardon 2/99 (25 overs)		295 (104.2 overs); CD Hartley 62 (127 balls); JM Herrick 3/97 (28.2 overs)
3/196 dec. (38 overs); AJ Finch 82 (92 balls); RA Broad 1/7 (2 overs)		9/399 (107 overs); JA Burns 123 (198 balls); JM Herrick 3/105 (26 overs)

Match drawn
Melbourne Cricket Ground
Umpires: Chris Gaffaney and Paul Reiffel
Player of the match: Joe Burns (Queensland)

- Victoria won the toss and elected to bat.

5–8 December 2011
Scorecard

South Australia	v	Western Australia (H)
93 (38 overs); TC Thornton 24 (84 balls); MG Hogan 5/24 (11 overs)		368 (99.4 overs); WM Robinson 91 (193 balls); JM Mennie 7/96 (29.4 overs)
289 (113.4 overs); CJ Ferguson 126 (201 balls); MG Hogan 4/62 (32.4 overs)		0/16 (5.2 overs); MS Harris 9* (14 balls); JM Mennie 0/4 (3 overs)

Western Australia won by 10 wickets
WACA Ground
Umpires: Gerard Abood and Tony Ward
Player of the match: Michael Hogan (Western Australia)

- South Australia won the toss and elected to bat.

6–9 December 2011
Scorecard

Tasmania	v	New South Wales (H)
392 (128.3 overs); AJ Doolan 82 (174 balls); JK Lalor 5/97 (31.3 overs)		264 (98.5 overs); PM Nevill 112* (217 balls); JP Faulkner 3/27 (15.5 overs)
0/272 dec. (54 overs); EJM Cowan 145* (159 balls); TA Copeland 0/3 (2 overs)		8/292 (100 overs); SM Katich 76 (123 balls); JM Bird 3/69 (21 overs)

Match drawn
Manuka Oval
Umpires: Ashley Barrow and Mick Martell
Player of the match: Steven Cazzulino (Tasmania)

- Tasmania won the toss and elected to bat.

=== January ===
No Sheffield Shield matches were played in January due to the 2011–12 Big Bash League season.

=== February ===
2–5 February 2012
Scorecard

Victoria	v	South Australia (H)
437 (118.4 overs); RJ Quiney 114 (145 balls); PR George 3/85 (29 overs)		224 (81.3 overs); JD Smith 76 (102 balls); JM Holland 3/43 (16.3 overs)
4/231 dec. (45.1 overs); RJ Quiney 119 (128 balls); JA Haberfield 2/57 (12 overs)		258 (80.2 overs); TLW Cooper 93 (161 balls); JM Holland 4/74 (26.2 overs)

Victoria won by 186 runs
Adelaide Oval
Umpires: Gerard Abood and Tony Ward
Player of the match: RJ Quiney (Victoria)

- Victoria won the toss and elected to bat.

6–9 February 2012
Scorecard

New South Wales	v	Tasmania (H)
341 (86 overs); SPD Smith 98 (151 balls); JJ Krejza 2/53 (12 overs)		7/345 dec. (102 overs); GJ Bailey 117 (140 balls); JK Lalor 3/73 (16 overs)
9/150 dec. (51.3 overs); PJ Hughes 36 (53 balls); JM Bird 4/51 (17 overs)		4/150 (43.2 overs); EM Cowan 39 (84 balls); SNJ O'Keefe 1/20 (9 overs)

Tasmania won by 6 wickets
Bellerive Oval
Umpires: Mick Martell and Damien Mealey
Player of the match: GJ Bailey (Tasmania)

- Tasmania won the toss and elected to field.

6–9 February 2012
Scorecard

(H) Queensland	v	Western Australia
251 (107.4 overs); CA Lynn 80 (162 balls); NM Coulter-Nile 4/66 (27 overs)		359 (109.3 overs); SE Marsh 79 (132 balls); BCJ Cutting 5/99 (22 overs)
175 (61.3 overs); JA Burns 43 (82 balls); NJ Rimmington 3/28 (14 overs)		9/68 (19.5 overs); AC Voges 18 (30 balls); AC McDermott 7/24 (10 overs)

Western Australia won by 1 wicket
Brisbane Cricket Ground
Umpires: Simon Fry and Adrian Holdstock
Player of the match: AC McDermott (Queensland)

- Queensland won the toss and elected to bat.

13–15 February 2012
Scorecard

(H) Victoria	v	South Australia
220 (62.1 overs); AB McDonald 72 (98 balls); JM Mennie 5/43 (21.1 overs)		100 (42 overs); TD Stray 29 (71 balls); AB McDonald 5/21 (16 overs)
181 (56 overs); JM Holland 55 (39 balls); CJ Sayers 5/57 (24 overs)		267 (84 overs); CJ Ferguson 71 (162 balls); PM Siddle 6/43 (24 overs)

Victoria won by 34 runs
Melbourne Cricket Ground
Umpires: Mick Martell and Adrian Holdstock
Player of the match: PM Siddle (Victoria)

- Victoria won the toss and elected to bat.

17–20 February 2012
Scorecard

Queensland	v	Tasmania (H)
205 (69 overs); BCJ Cutting 79 (84 balls); JM Bird 6/62 (22 overs)		260 (78 overs); EJM Cowan 82 (172 balls); AC McDermott 3/48 (20 overs)
215 (65.2 overs); BCJ Cutting 66* (83 balls); LR Butterworth 4/45 (15.2 overs)		2/163(43.1 overs); EJM Cowan 77 (97 balls); SJ Magoffin 1/28 (11 overs)

Tasmania won by 8 wickets
Bellerive Oval
Umpires: Ian Lock and Bob Parry
Player of the match: JM Bird (Tasmania)

- Tasmania won the toss and elected to field.

17–19 February 2012
Scorecard

New South Wales	v	Western Australia (H)
91 (44.2 overs); PJ Hughes 28 (106 balls); NM Coulter-Nile 4/20 (9 overs)		3/560 dec.(171 overs); LM Davis 303* (524 balls); SR Watson 1/16 (12 overs)
146 (51.3 overs); NM Hauritz 44 (67 balls); MA Beer 7/46 (16.3 overs)

Western Australia won by an innings and 323 runs
WACA Ground
Umpires: Ashley Barrow and Tony Ward
Player of the match: LM Davis (Western Australia)

- New South Wales won the toss and elected to bat.

29 February – 3 March 2012
Scorecard

(H) South Australia	v	Tasmania
126 (49.3 overs); TD Stray 51 (117 balls); JP Faulkner 4/22 (13 overs)		399 (118.2 overs); RT Ponting 130 (173 balls); JM Mennie 3/88 (28 overs)
2/421 (139 overs); M Klinger 219* (422 balls); JM Bird 1/74 (28 overs)

Match drawn
Adelaide Oval
Umpires: Sam Nogajski and John Ward
Player of the match: M Klinger (South Australia)

- South Australia won the toss and elected to bat.

=== March ===
1–4 March 2012
Scorecard

(H) New South Wales	v	Queensland
269 (91.1 overs); PJ Hughes 73 (121 balls); SJ Magoffin 6/44 (25 overs)		236 (78.3 overs); JA Burns 90 (174 balls); TA Copeland 4/69 (20 overs)
0/15 (6 overs); PJ Hughes 7* (11 balls); JR Hopes 0/0 (1 overs)

Match drawn
Sydney Cricket Ground
Umpires: Geoff Joshua and Tony Ward
Player of the match: TA Copeland (New South Wales)

- Queensland won the toss and elected to field.

1–4 March 2012
Scorecard

Victoria	v	Western Australia (H)
277 (101.4 overs); RJ Quiney 83 (245 balls); NJ Rimmington 5/46 (25 overs)		301 (76.2 overs); L Ronchi 64 (64 balls); PM Siddle 5/64 (21 overs)
8/390 dec. (103 overs); CJL Rogers 124 (223 balls); MA Beer 3/89 (28 overs)		154 (42.5 overs); NM Coulter-Nile 44* (40 balls); WD Sheridan 5/15 (9 overs)

Victoria won by 212 runs
WACA Ground
Umpires: Gerard Abood and Paul Wilson
Player of the match: WD Sheridan (Victoria)

- Western Australia won the toss and elected to field.

8–10 March 2012
Scorecard

Western Australia	v	Tasmania (H)
142 (58.5 overs); AC Voges 49 (126 balls); JM Bird 5/32 (19 overs)		363 (117.2 overs); EJM Cowan 143 (272 balls); JP Behrendorff 4/85 (23 overs)
241 (84.2 overs); L Ronchi 71 (106 balls); JM Bird 6/63 (22 overs)		2/21 (6.5 overs); EJM Cowan 12 (21 balls); NJ Rimmington 1/9 (3 overs)

Tasmania won by 8 wickets
Bellerive Oval
Umpires: Mick Martell and John Ward
Player of the match: JM Bird (Tasmania)

- Tasmania won the toss and elected to field.

8–10 March 2012
Scorecard

South Australia	v	Queensland (H)
162 (71.3 overs); GD Putland 31 (53 balls); JR Hopes 3/28 (18 overs)		356 (102 overs); JA Burns 130 (240 balls); GD Putland 6/72 (30 overs)
103 (64.4 overs); TLW Cooper 49 (117 balls); AC McDermott 4/35 (12.4 overs)

Queensland won by an innings and 91 runs
Brisbane Cricket Ground
Umpires: Gerard Abood and Ian Lock
Player of the match: JA Burns (Queensland)

- Queensland won the toss and elected to field.

8–10 March 2012
Scorecard

New South Wales	v	Victoria (H)
208 (82.4 overs); SPD Smith 86 (126 balls); JM Herrick 3/50 (18 overs)		185 (59.5 overs); CL White 39 (98 balls); BJ Rohrer 4/13 (4.5 overs)
212 (60.4 overs); PM Nevill 56* (101 balls); AB McDonald 4/42 (18.4 overs)		5/236 (53.5 overs); CJL Rogers 70 (109 balls); CP Tremain 3/51 (10 overs)

Victoria won by 5 wickets
Melbourne Cricket Ground
Umpires: Geoff Joshua and Paul Wilson
Player of the match: AC McDonald (Victoria)

- New South Wales won the toss and elected to bat.

== Final ==
16–19 March 2012
Scorecard

Tasmania	v	Queensland (H)
241 (107.5 overs); SJ Cazzulino 68 (198 balls); AC McDermott 6/54 (24.5 overs)		276 (83.1 overs); CD Hartley 111 (169 balls); LR Butterworth 4/54 (24 overs)
167 (64 overs); EJM Cowan 71 (171 balls); JR Hopes 5/61 (20 overs)		7/133 (62.1 overs); WJ Townsend 36 (122 balls); JP Faulkner 3/27 (18 overs)

Queensland won by 3 wickets
Brisbane Cricket Ground
Umpires: Simon Fry and Bruce Oxenford
Player of the match: CD Hartley (Queensland)

- Tasmania won the toss and elected to bat.

== Statistics ==
=== Most runs ===
Player	Team	Matches	Innings	Not Outs	Runs	Average	HS	100s	50s
Ed Cowan	Tasmania	10	19	3	948	59.25	145*	3	4
Rob Quiney	Victoria	10	19	0	938	49.36	119	3	5
Liam Davis	Western Australia	8	15	1	921	65.78	303*	3	3
Michael Klinger	South Australia	10	19	1	835	46.38	219*	1	4
Joe Burns	Queensland	11	19	0	781	41.10	130	2	4

Last updated 20 March 2012

=== Highest scores ===
Runs	Balls	Player	Team	Opponent	Ground	Date of match
303*	524	Liam Davis	West Australia	New South Wales	WACA Ground	17 February 2012
219	422	Michael Klinger	South Australia	Tasmania	Adelaide Oval	29 February 2012
203*	291	Tom Cooper	South Australia	New South Wales	Sydney Cricket Ground	6 November 2011
178	371	Adam Voges	Western Australia	New South Wales	WACA Ground	17 February 2012
166*	379	Wade Townsend	Queensland	South Australia	Adelaide Oval	25 November 2011

Last updated 20 March 2012

=== Most wickets ===
Player	Team	Matches	Overs	Wickets	Average	BBI	5wi	10wm
Jackson Bird	Tasmania	8	307.4	53	16.00	6/62	5	2
Michael Hogan	Western Australia	10	387.3	46	23.52	5/24	2	0
Jayde Herrick	Victoria	10	366.5	45	30.97	5/79	1	0
James Faulkner	Tasmania	10	313.3	39	25.17	4/22	0	0
Ben Cutting	Queensland	8	204.4	36	18.75	5/43	2	0

Last updated 20 March 2012

=== Best bowling ===
Figures	Overs	Player	Team	Opponent	Ground	Match date
7/24	10.0	Alister McDermott	Queensland	Western Australia	Brisbane Cricket Ground	6 February 2012
7/46	16.3	Michael Beer	Western Australia	New South Wales	WACA Ground	17 February 2012
7/60	21.4	Ryan Harris	Queensland	Tasmania	Brisbane Cricket Ground	25 October 2011
7/96	29.4	Joe Mennie	South Australia	Western Australia	WACA Ground	5 December 2011
6/40	18.2	Clint McKay	Victoria	Tasmania	Melbourne Cricket Ground	22 November 2011

Last updated 20 March 2012

== See also ==
- 2011–12 Ryobi One-Day Cup
- 2011–12 Big Bash League season
