= 2012–13 Sheffield Shield season =

Australian cricket tournament

2012–13 Sheffield Shield
- Administrator: Cricket Australia
- Cricket format: First-class
- Tournament format: Double round-robin
- Champions: Tasmania (3rd title)
- Participants: 6
- Player of the series: Ricky Ponting (Tasmania)
- Most runs: Ricky Ponting (Tasmania) – 911 runs
- Most wickets: Chadd Sayers (South Australia) – 48 wickets

The 2012–13 Sheffield Shield season was the 111th season of the Sheffield Shield, the Australian domestic first-class cricket competition. The competition was won by Tasmania. It was one of the most tightly contested seasons in many years, with all six teams having a chance to make the final heading into the last round of the regular season.

== Table ==
Team	Pld	WO	WI	D	LO	LI	Pts	Quot
Tasmania	10	4	1	0	3	2	30	1.3755
Queensland	10	4	1	0	5	0	30	0.9896
New South Wales	10	4	3	0	2	1	29	1.1526
Victoria	10	4	1	0	4	1	28	0.9453
Western Australia	10	4	0	0	5	1	28	0.8198
South Australia	10	4	0	0	5	1	26	0.8533

Updated to completion of season.

== Fixtures ==
=== September 2012 ===
18–20 September
Scorecard

(home team) Western Australia	v	New South Wales
217 (82.1 overs); Mitchell Marsh 67 (133); Doug Bollinger 3/55 (19.1 overs)		358 (103 overs); Moisés Henriques 78 (115); Nathan Rimmington 4/70 (22 overs)
248 (66 overs); Liam Davis 73 (127); Trent Copeland 4/57 (19 overs)		2/108 (24.1 overs); Peter Nevill 65 (73); Nathan Rimmington 1/18 (6 overs)

New South Wales won by 8 wickets
Western Australia Cricket Association Ground, Perth, Western Australia
Umpires: Gerard Abood and Simon Fry
Player of the match: Trent Copeland (New South Wales)

- New South Wales won the toss and elected to field
- Points: New South Wales 6, Western Australia 0

26–29 September
Scorecard

(home team) New South Wales	v	Tasmania
442 (131.3 overs); Moisés Henriques 161* (229); Jackson Bird 3/75 (25 overs)		8/298d (109 overs); Mark Cosgrove 84 (148); Doug Bollinger 3/60 (24 overs)
6/198d (40 overs); Nic Maddinson 86 (105); Jackson Bird 3/46 (10 overs)		7/262 (77 overs); Aiden Blizzard 88 (106); Moisés Henriques 3/41 (12 overs)

Match drawn
Bankstown Oval, Sydney
Umpires: Tony Ward and Paul Wilson
Player of the match: Moisés Henriques (New South Wales)

- New South Wales won the toss and elected to bat
- Points: New South Wales 2, Tasmania 0

30 September – 2 October
Scorecard

(home team) Western Australia	v	Victoria
175 (48.5 overs); Tom Triffitt 42 (57); James Pattinson 4/30 (14 overs)		375 (98.4 overs); Andrew McDonald 101 (88); Michael Hogan 3/73 (20.4 overs)
200 (58.3 overs); Nathan Coulter-Nile 45 (30); John Hastings 5/30 (13.3 overs)		0/4 (0.1 overs); Chris Rogers 4 (1); Mitchell Johnson 0/4 (0.1 overs)

Victoria won by 10 wickets
Western Australia Cricket Association Ground, Perth, Western Australia
Umpires: Damien Mealey and John Ward
Player of the match: John Hastings (Victoria)

- Victoria won the toss and elected to field
- Points: Victoria 6, Western Australia 0

=== October 2012 ===
1–4 October
Scorecard

(home team) Queensland	v	South Australia
398 (113.4 overs); Ben Cutting 109 (78); Gary Putland 5/100 (34 overs)		184 (66.1 overs); Phillip Hughes 95 (146); James Hopes 5/27 (20 overs)
8/248d (58.1 overs); Chris Hartley 103* (107); Chadd Sayers 3/66 (18 overs)		271 (77.4 overs); Phillip Hughes 83 (167); Luke Feldman 4/50 (18.4 overs)

Queensland won by 191 runs
Brisbane Cricket Ground, Woolloongabba, Brisbane
Umpires: Ashley Barrow and Ian Lock
Player of the match: Ben Cutting (Queensland)

- South Australia won the toss and elected to field
- Points: Queensland 6, South Australia 0

9–12 October
Scorecard

Tasmania	v	South Australia (home team)
3/403d (112 overs); Alex Doolan 149 (226); Johan Botha 1/63 (15 overs)		224 (67 overs); Tim Ludeman 85 (126); Luke Butterworth 6/49 (21 overs)
		149 f/o (51.4 overs); Phillip Hughes 37 (66); Luke Butterworth 4/40 (20 overs)

Tasmania won by an innings and 30 runs
Adelaide Oval, Adelaide
Umpires: Geoff Joshua and Paul Wilson
Player of the match: Luke Butterworth (Tasmania)

- Tasmania won the toss and elected to bat
- Points: Tasmania 6, South Australia 0

10–13 October
Scorecard

(home team) Queensland	v	Victoria
149 (47.3 overs); Usman Khawaja 28 (66); John Hastings 4/41 (10.3 overs)		227 (84.2 overs); Matthew Wade 89 (175); Alister McDermott 3/45 (22.2 overs)
125 (53.4 overs); Wade Townsend 42 (130); James Pattinson 6/32 (14.4 overs)		0/48 (9.3 overs); Robert Quiney 25 (27); Alister McDermott 0/21 (4.3 overs)

Victoria won by 10 wickets
Brisbane Cricket Ground, Woolloongabba, Brisbane
Umpires: Sam Nogajski and Paul Reiffel
Player of the match: James Pattinson (Victoria)

- Victoria won the toss and elected to field
- Points: Victoria 6, Queensland 0

23–26 October
Scorecard

Tasmania	v	Victoria (home team)
5/439d (132 overs); Ricky Ponting 162 (242)*; John Hastings 2/58 (25 overs)		320 (107.2 overs); Andrew McDonald 64 (116); Jackson Bird 4/73 (24.2 overs)
2/165 (51.4 overs); Alex Doolan 60* (118); James Pattinson 2/24 (9 overs)

Match drawn
Melbourne Cricket Ground, Melbourne
Umpires: Paul Reiffel and John Ward
Player of the match: Ricky Ponting (Tasmania)

- Victoria won the toss and elected to field
- Points: Tasmania 2, Victoria 0

23–26 October
Scorecard

(home team) South Australia	v	Queensland
9/402d (135.5 overs); Callum Ferguson 164 (342); Ben Cutting 3/73 (29 overs)		9/406d (114.3 overs); Wade Townsend 129 (307); Daniel Christian 4/81 (29.3 overs)
225 (76.4 overs); Daniel Christian 71 (129); Cameron Boyce 2/47 (19 overs)		6/129 (45 overs); Alex Kemp 33 (61); Daniel Worrall 3/36 (8 overs)

Match drawn
Adelaide Oval, Adelaide
Umpires: Gerard Abood and Simon Fry
Player of the match: Callum Ferguson (South Australia)

- South Australia won the toss and elected to bat
- Points: Queensland 2, South Australia 0

=== November 2012 ===
1–4 November
Scorecard

South Australia	v	Tasmania (home team)
112 (49.1 overs); Johan Botha 22 (48); James Faulkner 5/23 (12 overs)		138 (52 overs); Ben Dunk 45 (73); Chadd Sayers 4/29 (13 overs)
237 (83.2 overs); Travis Head 75 (108); Luke Butterworth 3/40 (19.2 overs)		196 (75.3 overs); Luke Butterworth 57 (76); Kane Richardson 4/34 (16 overs)

South Australia won by 15 runs
Bellerive Oval, Hobart
Umpires: Ian Lock and Sam Nogajski
Player of the match: Daniel Christian (South Australia)

- Tasmania won the toss and elected to field
- Points: South Australia 6, Tasmania 2

1–4 November
Scorecard

Western Australia	v	Victoria (home team)
248 (79.1 overs); Marcus North 87 (170); Clint McKay 2/49 (20 overs)		219 (60.4 overs); Clint McKay 65 (51); Jason Behrendorff 4/29 (15 overs)
138 (49.4 overs); Mitchell Johnson 40* (32); James Pattinson 4/42 (16 overs)		5/171 (54.1 overs); Matthew Wade 50* (73); Jason Behrendorff 3/24 (10 overs)

Victoria won by 5 wickets
Melbourne Cricket Ground, Melbourne
Umpires: Vineet Kulkarni and Paul Wilson
Player of the match: Clint McKay (Victoria)

- Victoria won the toss and elected to field
- Points: Victoria 6, Western Australia 2

2–5 November
Scorecard

New South Wales	v	Queensland (home team)
184 (67.2 overs); Peter Nevill 42 (140); Luke Feldman 4/47 (19.3 overs)		256 (81.5 overs); Joe Burns 64 (115); Trent Copeland 2/42 (21.5 overs)
175 (44.4 overs); David Warner 39 (44); Cameron Gannon 4/61 (15.4 overs)		4/106 (22.1 overs); Usman Khawaja 54 (55); Trent Copeland 2/33 (5.1 overs)

Queensland won by 6 wickets
Allan Border Field, Albion, Brisbane
Umpires: Geoff Joshua and Bruce Oxenford
Player of the match: Usman Khawaja (Queensland)

- Queensland won the toss and elected to field
- Points: Queensland 6, New South Wales 0

9–12 November
Scorecard

(home team) Tasmania	v	Queensland
95 (25.1 overs); Ben Dunk 22 (24); Ben Cutting 4/25 (8.1 overs)		360 (85 overs); Usman Khawaja 138 (178); James Faulkner 4/98 (20 overs)
142 (62 overs); Aiden Blizzard 49 (81); Cameron Gannon 6/53 (21 overs)

Queensland won by an innings and 123 runs
Bellerive Oval, Hobart
Umpires: Simon Fry and Vineet Kulkarni
Player of the match: Usman Khawaja (Queensland)

- Queensland won the toss and elected to field
- Points: Queensland 6, Tasmania 0

12–15 November
Scorecard

(home team) Western Australia	v	South Australia
9/400d (117.5 overs); Marcus Harris 114 (201); Joe Mennie 4/115 (25 overs)		237 (84.2 overs); Phillip Hughes 92 (148); Mitchell Marsh 2/35 (6 overs)
191 (58.3 overs); Tom Triffitt 85 (97); Chadd Sayers 3/37 (17 overs)		244 (91.2 overs); Travis Head 95* (178); Mitchell Johnson 3/52 (19.2 overs)

Western Australia won by 110 runs
Western Australia Cricket Association Ground, Perth, Western Australia
Umpires: Mick Martell and John Ward
Player of the match: Nathan Coulter-Nile (Western Australia)

- Western Australia won the toss and elected to bat
- Points: Western Australia 6, South Australia 0

13–16 November
Scorecard

(home team) New South Wales	v	Victoria
293 (90 overs); Brad Haddin 108* (158); Louis Cameron 3/61 (19 overs)		330 (111.3 overs); Chris Rogers 125 (258); Mitchell Starc 4/72 (22.3 overs)
3/194 (64 overs); Scott Henry 81* (183); David Hussey 2/16 (7 overs)

Match drawn
Sydney Cricket Ground, Sydney
Umpires: Ian Lock and Tony Ward
Player of the match: Chris Rogers (Victoria)

- New South Wales won the toss and elected to bat
- Rain reduced play on the final day to 5 overs
- Points: Victoria 2, New South Wales 0
- First class debut: Louis Cameron (Victoria)

23–26 November
Scorecard

(home team) Victoria	v	South Australia
346 (121 overs); John Hastings 80 (98); Gary Putland 7/64 (36 overs)		443 (119.2 overs); Phillip Hughes 158 (256); John Hastings 5/66 (26 overs)
132 (61 overs); Peter Handscomb 50 (136); Gary Putland 5/28 (25 overs)		1/36 (7 overs); Michael Klinger 18* (19); Jayde Herrick 1/10 (3 overs)

South Australia won by 9 wickets
Melbourne Cricket Ground, Melbourne
Umpires: Mick Martell and Damien Mealey
Player of the match: Gary Putland (South Australia)

- South Australia won the toss and elected to field
- Points: South Australia 6, Victoria 0

26–29 November
Scorecard

Western Australia	v	Tasmania (home team)
67 (37.3 overs); Marcus Harris 21 (41); Jackson Bird 6/25 (13.3 overs)		448 (131 overs); Ben Dunk 97 (208); Mitchell Johnson 4/103 (30 overs)
263 (100.1 overs); Sam Whiteman 96 (229); Luke Butterworth 5/50 (25.1 overs)

Tasmania won by an innings and 118 runs
Bellerive Oval, Hobart
Umpires: Ashley Barrow and Tony Ward
Player of the match: Jackson Bird (Tasmania)

- Western Australia won the toss and elected to bat
- Points: Tasmania 6, Western Australia 0

27–30 November
Scorecard

Queensland	v	New South Wales (home team)
243 (73.4 overs); Nathan Reardon 71 (147); Doug Bollinger 4/57 (21.4 overs)		8/319d (109.2 overs); Steve Smith 90 (182); Cameron Gannon 3/51 (28.2 overs)
173 (73 overs); Wade Townsend 39 (90); Adam Zampa 3/17 (6 overs)		7/98 (37.3 overs); Brad Haddin 33 (61); Ben Cutting 4/30 (12.3 overs)

New South Wales won by 3 wickets
Manuka Oval, Canberra
Umpires: Paul Reiffel and Derek Walker
Player of the match: Brad Haddin (New South Wales)

- Queensland won the toss and elected to bat
- Points: New South Wales 6, Queensland 0
- First class debut: Adam Zampa (New South Wales)

=== January 2013 ===
24–27 January
Scorecard

Western Australia	v	New South Wales (home team)
242 (98.2 overs); John Rogers 45 (131); Stephen O'Keefe 4/55 (29.2 overs)		344 (111.2 overs); Steve Smith 72 (163); Ashton Agar 3/103 (37.2 overs)
8/219 (84 overs); Marcus Harris 43 (67); Stephen O'Keefe 4/47 (32 overs)

Match drawn
Blacktown Olympic Park Oval, Blacktown
Umpires: Gerard Abood and Sam Nogajski
Player of the match: Stephen O'Keefe (New South Wales)

- New South Wales won the toss and elected to field
- Points: New South Wales 2, Western Australia 0
- First class debuts: Ashton Agar (Western Australia) and Hilton Cartwright (New South Wales)

24–27 January
Scorecard

Victoria	v	South Australia (home team)
319 (103.5 overs); Chris Rogers 131 (254); Chadd Sayers 6/49 (23 overs)		267 (99 overs); Phillip Hughes 120 (209); Will Sheridan 4/49 (19 overs)
136 (65.2 overs); James Pattinson 33 (64); Joe Mennie 6/43 (21 overs)		9/191 (54.2 overs); Tim Ludeman 49 (79); Scott Boland 3/30 (9.2 overs)

South Australia won by 1 wicket
Adelaide Oval, Adelaide
Umpires: Ian Lock and Paul Wilson
Player of the match: Joe Mennie (South Australia)

- Victoria won the toss and elected to bat
- Points: South Australia 6, Victoria 2
- First class debut: James Muirhead (Victoria)

=== February 2013 ===
4–7 February
Scorecard

Western Australia	v	Queensland (home team)
111 (51.5 overs); Adam Voges 38 (95); Cameron Gannon 4/49 (18 overs)		168 (53.1 overs); Greg Moller 44 (68); Michael Hogan 4/43 (16.1 overs)
496 (136.4 overs); John Rogers 89 (132); Matthew Gale 4/109 (27)		340 (122.4 overs); Greg Moller 120 (234); Nathan Coulter-Nile 6/84 (29 overs)

Western Australia won by 99 runs
Brisbane Cricket Ground, Woolloongabba, Brisbane
Umpires: Ashley Barrow and Damien Mealey
Player of the match: Nathan Coulter-Nile (Western Australia)

- Queensland won the toss and elected to field
- Points: Western Australia 6, Queensland 2

6–9 February
Scorecard

(home team) Tasmania	v	New South Wales
6/425d (129 overs); Ricky Ponting 200* (349); Josh Hazlewood 3/76 (24 overs)		500 (147.1 overs); Nic Maddinson 154 (230); Luke Butterworth 5/83 (32 overs)
245 (72.2 overs); Mark Cosgrove 92 (136); Chris Tremain 5/57 (12.2 overs)		8/123 (25 overs); Nic Maddinson 31 (30); Evan Gulbis 4/36 (7 overs)

Match drawn
Bellerive Oval, Hobart
Umpires: Gerard Abood and Geoff Joshua

- Tasmania won the toss and elected to bat
- Points: New South Wales 2, Tasmania 0

18–21 February
Scorecard

Queensland	v	Victoria (home team)
322 (93.1 overs); Peter Forrest 119 (235); Will Sheridan 4/71 (19 overs)		9/536d (169.3 overs); Cameron White 144 (234); Michael Hill 144 (323); Nathan Hauritz 5/135 (54.3 overs)
249 (93.3 overs); Greg Moller 43 (89); Fawad Ahmed 5/83 (32.3 overs)		2/36 (4.5 overs); Cameron White 19* (9); Cameron Gannon 1/19 (2.5 overs)

Victoria won by 8 wickets
Melbourne Cricket Ground, Melbourne
Umpires: Geoff Joshua and Tony Ward
Player of the match: Cameron White (Victoria)

- Queensland won the toss and elected to bat
- Points: Victoria 6, Queensland 0
- First-class debuts: Ronan McDonald and Dominic Michael (Queensland); Clive Rose (Victoria)

19–22 February
Scorecard

New South Wales	v	South Australia (home team)
157 (54.2 overs); Brad Haddin 56 (78); Chadd Sayers 5/54 (20 overs)		240 (82.5 overs); Jake Brown 65 (114); Trent Copeland 4/56 (26 overs)
173 (63.2 overs); Peter Nevil 36 (114); Joe Mennie 4/48 (23 overs)		6/94 (32.3 overs); Sam Raphael 34 (70); Doug Bollinger 4/31 (11 overs)

South Australia won by 4 wickets
Adelaide Oval, Adelaide
Umpires: Ashley Barrow and Mick Martell
Player of the match: Chadd Sayers (South Australia)

- New South Wales won the toss and elected to bat
- Points South Australia 6, New South Wales 0
- First-class debut: Alex Carey (South Australia)

21–24 February
Scorecard

Tasmania	v	Western Australia (home team)
211 (67.4 overs); Jason Krejza 36 (32); Ashton Agar 3/47 (14 overs)		97 (41.5 overs); Sam Whiteman 19 (49); Luke Butterworth 5/35 (15 overs)
242 (67.2 overs); Ricky Ponting 76 (92); Ryan Duffield 4/71 (18 overs)		8/358 (112.2 overs); Sam Whiteman 83 (167); James Faulkner 4/69 (26.2 overs)

Western Australia won by 2 wickets
Western Australia Cricket Association Ground, Perth, Western Australia
Umpires: Ian Lock and Sam Nogajski
Player of the match: Sam Whiteman (Western Australia)

- Western Australia won the toss and elected to field
- Points: Western Australia 6, Tasmania 2

=== March 2013 ===
7–10 March
Scorecard

Tasmania	v	Queensland (home team)
245 (98.3 overs); Jonathan Wells 82 (133); Ryan Harris 3/85 (26 overs)		281 (95.5 overs); Joe Burns 120 (293); Ben Hilfenhaus 4/84 (23.5 overs)
6/342d (109 overs); Alex Doolan 83 (189); Cameron Gannon		143 (60 overs); Luke Pomersbach 61 (142); Luke Butterworth 4/30 (21 overs)

Tasmania won by 163 runs
Brisbane Cricket Ground, Woolloongabba, Brisbane
Umpires: Geoff Joshua and Ian Lock
Player of the match: Ben Hilfenhaus (Tasmania)

- Queensland won the toss and elected to field
- Points: Tasmania 6, Queensland 2
- First-class debut: Jordan Silk (Tasmania)

7–10 March
Scorecard

(home team) Victoria	v	New South Wales
128 (39.3 overs); Clint McKay 41 (42); Gurinder Sandhu 5/31 (11 overs)		268 (68.3 overs); Nic Maddinson 76 (67); Cameron White 3/4 (4.3 overs)
289 (102.1 overs); Cameron White 73 (149); Steve O'Keefe 3/54 (22.4 overs)		4/150 (51 overs); Ben Rohrer 38* (78); Jayde Herrick 1/21 (9 overs)

New South Wales won by 6 wickets
Melbourne Cricket Ground, Melbourne
Umpires: Damien Mealey and Tony Ward
Player of the match: Gurinder Sandhu (New South Wales)

- Victoria won the toss and elected to bat
- Points: New South Wales 6, Victoria 0
- First-class debut: Gurinder Sandhu (New South Wales)

7–10 March
Scorecard

(home team) South Australia	v	Western Australia
248 (101.5 overs); Callum Ferguson 63 (166); Michael Hogan 5/40 (23 overs)		235 (84.3 overs); Michael Hussey 99* (154); Johan Botha 5/59 (26 overs)
193 (77 overs); Tim Ludeman 57 (130); Ashton Agar 5/65 (22 overs)		9/211 (72.2 overs); Marcus Harris 74 (115); Johan Botha 3/60 (29.2 overs)

Western Australia won by 1 wicket
Adelaide Oval, Adelaide
Umpires: Dennis Smith and John Ward
Player of the match: Michael Hogan (Western Australia)

- Western Australia won the toss and elected to field
- Points: Western Australia 6, South Australia 2

14–17 March
Scorecard

(home team) Tasmania	v	Victoria
6/369d (95.4 overs); Ricky Ponting 104 (131); Fawad Ahmed 2/86 (23.4 overs)		358 (108.4 overs); David Hussey 112 (152); Evan Gulbis 5/104 (24.4 overs)
7/325d (75.2 overs); Jordan Silk 127 (210); Fawad Ahmed 4/122 (30.2 overs)		225 (63 overs); Rob Quiney 55 (86); James Faulkner 5/56 (15 overs)

Tasmania won by 111 runs
Bellerive Oval, Hobart
Umpires: Gerard Abood and Dennis Smith
Player of the match: Jordan Silk (Tasmania)

- Victoria won the toss and elected to field
- Points: Tasmania 6, Victoria 0
- First-class debut: Ryan Sidebottom (Victoria)

14–17 March
Scorecard

South Australia	v	New South Wales (home team)
182 (66.3 overs); Johan Botha 53 (83); Gurinder Sandhu 4/58 (17 overs)		219 (80.5 overs); Steve O'Keefe 46 (101); Chadd Sayers 5/53 (28.5 overs)
127 (50 overs); Callum Ferguson 44* (119); Gurinder Sandhu 3/20 (11 overs)		2/91 (21.2 overs); Nic Maddinson 41* (17); Chadd Sayers 1/29 (11 overs)

New South Wales won by 8 wickets
Sydney Cricket Ground, Sydney
Umpires: Simon Fry and John Ward
Player of the match: Gurinder Sandhu (New South Wales)

- New South Wales won the toss and elected to field
- Points: New South Wales 6, South Australia 0
- First-class debut: Daniel Hughes (New South Wales)

14–17 March
Scorecard

Queensland	v	Western Australia (home team)
164 (48.2 overs); Luke Pomersbach 57 (80); Burt Cockley 4/50 (14 overs)		228 (76.2 overs); Michael Hussey 96 (190); Ryan Harris 6/58 (25.2 overs)
9/336d (106 overs); Michael Neser 77 (137); Ryan Duffield 4/83 (26 overs)		152 (53.5 overs); Michael Hussey 37 (79); James Hopes 4/42 (18 overs)

Queensland won by 120 runs
Western Australia Cricket Association Ground, Perth, Western Australia
Umpires: Mick Martell and Paul Wilson
Player of the match: Ryan Harris (Queensland)

- Western Australia won the toss and elected to field
- Points: Queensland 6, Western Australia 2

== Final ==
22–26 March
Scorecard

(home team) Tasmania	v	Queensland
419 (173.4 overs); Jordan Silk 108 (358); James Hopes 4/71 (40.4 overs)		225 (87.2 overs); Peter Forrest 56 (172); Evan Gulbis 4/62 (21 overs)
251 (96.5 overs); James Faulkner 89 (207); Ryan Harris 4/32 (14 overs)		6/183 (87 overs); Nathan Reardon 51 (149); Luke Butterworth 2/30 (20 overs)

Match drawn
Bellerive Oval, Hobart
Umpires: Simon Fry and John Ward
Player of the match: James Faulkner

- Tasmania won the toss and elected to bat

== Statistics ==
=== Most runs ===
Player	Team	Matches	Innings	Not Out	Runs	HS	Average	100s	50s
Ricky Ponting	Tasmania	9	16	4	911	200*	75.91	3	4
Mark Cosgrove	Tasmania	11	20	0	784	104	39.20	1	7
Chris Rogers	Victoria	10	17	2	742	131	49.46	3	1
Alex Doolan	Tasmania	10	18	1	715	149	42.05	1	4
Phillip Hughes	South Australia	6	12	0	673	158	56.08	2	3

=== High scores ===
Player	Team	Runs	Balls	Opponent	Ground	Date
Ricky Ponting	Tasmania	200*	349	New South Wales	Hobart	6 February 2013
Callum Ferguson	South Australia	164	342	Queensland	Adelaide	23 October 2012
Ricky Ponting	Tasmania	162*	242	Victoria	Melbourne	23 October 2012
Moisés Henriques	New South Wales	161*	229	Tasmania	Sydney	26 September 2012
Phillip Hughes	South Australia	158	256	Victoria	Melbourne	23 November 2012

=== Most wickets ===
Player	Team	Matches	Overs	Runs	Wickets	Average	BBI
Chadd Sayers	South Australia	9	353.0	889	48	18.52	6/49
Luke Butterworth	Tasmania	11	376.4	936	45	20.80	6/49
James Faulkner	Tasmania	10	282.4	793	39	20.33	5/23
Joe Mennie	South Australia	6	234.0	727	33	22.03	6/43
Michael Hogan	Western Australia	9	300.5	750	30	25.00	5/40

=== Best bowling ===
Player	Team	Figures	Overs	Opponent	Ground	Date
Gary Putland	South Australia	7/64	12.0	Victoria	Melbourne	23 November 2012
Jackson Bird	Tasmania	6/25	20.0	Western Australia	Hobart	25 November 2012
James Pattinson	Victoria	6/32	14.4	Queensland	Brisbane	10 October 2012
Joe Mennie	South Australia	6/43	21.0	Tasmania	Adelaide	24 January 2013
Luke Butterworth	Tasmania	6/49	21.0	South Australia	Adelaide	9 October 2012
