= 2012–13 Ryobi One-Day Cup =

2012–13 National One Day Cup
- Administrator: Cricket Australia
- Cricket format: Limited overs cricket
- Tournament format: Round-robin tournament
- Champions: Queensland Bulls (9th title)
- Participants: 6
- Matches: 25
- Most runs: Aaron Finch (Victoria) (504)
- Most wickets: Kane Richardson (South Australia) (21)

The 2012–13 Ryobi One Day Cup was the 43rd season of official List A domestic cricket in Australia. The competition had the same format as the previous season.

The 2012–13 competition was won by the Queensland Bulls. The final was reduced to 32 overs due to rain, with Queensland defeating Victoria by 2 runs. The win was Queensland's first since the 2008–09 season.

== Table ==
Pos	Team	Pld	W	L	T	NR	BP	Pts	NRR
1	Victorian Bushrangers	8	5	3	0	0	3	23	0.701
2	Queensland Bulls	8	4	3	0	1	1	19	−0.632
3	Southern Redbacks	8	4	4	0	0	2	18	0.269
4	New South Wales Blues	8	4	4	0	0	1	17	−0.331
5	Tasmanian Tigers	8	3	4	0	1	1	15	−0.025
6	Western Warriors	8	3	5	0	0	2	14	−0.029

Source: Points Table at Cricket Australia

Visitor team →	NSW	QLD	SA	TAS	VIC	WA
Home team ↓	NSW	QLD	SA	TAS	VIC	WA
New South Wales		Queensland; 30 runs	NSW; 56 runs		Victoria; 6 wickets	WA; 111 runs
Queensland	Queensland; 110 runs			Match abandoned	Victoria; 190 runs	WA; 110 runs
South Australia	NSW; 18 runs	SA; 9 wickets		Tasmania; 3 runs	Victoria; 2 wickets	
Tasmania	NSW; 37 runs	Queensland; 5 wickets	SA; 82 runs			Tasmania; 85 runs
Victoria		Queensland; 6 wickets	SA; 4 wickets	Victoria; 25 runs		Victoria; 9 wickets
Western Australia	NSW; 27 runs		SA; 14 runs	Tasmania; 51 runs	WA; 25 runs	

Home team won	Visitor team won

- Note: Results listed are according to the home (horizontal) and visitor (vertical) teams.
- Note: Click on a result to see a summary of the match.

== Fixtures ==
=== September 2012 ===
16 September 2012
11:15
Scorecard

New South Wales; 5/281 (50 overs)	v	Western Australia (H); 254 (49.4 overs)
Steve Smith 99 (88); Mitchell Johnson 2/68 (12 overs)		Mitchell Marsh 78 (65); Doug Bollinger 4/67 (13 overs)

New South Wales won by 27 runs
Western Australia Cricket Association Ground, Perth, Western Australia
Umpires: Gerard Abood and Simon Fry
Player of the match: Doug Bollinger (New South Wales)

- Western Australia won the toss and elected to field.
- List A debuts: Scott Henry (New South Wales) and Sam Whiteman (Western Australia)
- Points: New South Wales 4, Western Australia 0

28 September 2012
11:15
Scorecard

(H) Western Australia; 9/248 (50 overs)	v	Victoria; 223 (48.4 overs)
Liam Davis 93 (104); John Hastings 4/59 (13 overs)		Michael Hill 40 (47); Nathan Coulter-Nile 4/65 (12 overs)

Western Australia won by 25 runs
Western Australia Cricket Association Ground, Perth, Western Australia
Umpires: Damien Mealey and John Ward
Player of the match: Liam Davis (Western Australia)

- Western Australia won the toss and elected to bat.
- List A debut: William Bosisto (Western Australia)
- Points: Western Australia 4, Victoria 0

=== October 2012 ===
7 October 2012
13:15 (D/N)
Scorecard

Victoria; 2/379 (50 overs)	v	Queensland (H); 189 (38.1 overs)
Aaron Finch 154 (141); Ben Cutting 2/101 (12 overs)		Joe Burns 50 (55); Jon Holland 3/49 (13 overs)

Victoria won by 190 runs
Brisbane Cricket Ground, Woolloongabba, Brisbane
Umpires: Ian Lock and Paul Reiffel
Player of the match: Aaron Finch (Victoria)

- Victoria won the toss and elected to bat
- Points: Victoria 6, Queensland 0

14 October 2012
13:45 (D/N)
Scorecard

Tasmania; 9/221 (50 overs)	v	South Australia (H); 218 (49.5 overs)
Ricky Ponting 47 (63); Johan Botha 3/42 (13 overs)		Daniel Christian 81* (98); Jason Krejza 4/35 (10 overs)

Tasmania won by 3 runs
Adelaide Oval, Adelaide
Umpires: Geoff Joshua and Paul Wilson
Player of the match: Jason Krejza (Tasmania)

- South Australia won the toss and elected to field
- List A debuts: Alex Ross and Daniel Worrall (South Australia)
- Points: Tasmania 4, South Australia 0

21 October 2012
13:45 (D/N)
Scorecard

Queensland; 189 (48.5 overs)	v	South Australia (H); 1/192 (36.1 overs)
Usman Khawaja 57 (69); Kane Richardson 6/48 (11 overs)		Phillip Hughes 95 (103); James Hopes 1/20 (5 overs)

South Australia won by 9 wickets
Adelaide Oval, Adelaide
Umpires: Simon Fry and Tony Ward
Player of the match: Kane Richardson

- South Australia won the toss and elected to field
- Points: South Australia 5, Queensland 0

28 October 2012
14:15 (D/N)
Scorecard

(H) Victoria; 6/348 (50 overs)	v	Tasmania; 323 (49.4 overs)
David Hussey 100 (78); Ben Laughlin 3/68 (10 overs)		George Bailey 74 (67); Darren Pattinson 4/46 (9 overs)

Victoria won by 25 runs
Melbourne Cricket Ground, Melbourne
Umpires: Geoff Joshua and Paul Reiffel
Player of the match: David Hussey (Victoria)

- Victoria won the toss and elected to field
- Points: Victoria 4, Tasmania 0

31 October 2012
14:15 (D/N)
Scorecard

South Australia; 8/248 (50 overs)	v	Tasmania (H); 166 (43.4 overs)
Phillip Hughes 114 (134); Jason Krejza 4/58 (11 overs)		Mark Cosgrove 37 (47); Johan Botha 4/29 (10.4 overs)

South Australia won by 82 runs
Bellerive Oval, Hobart
Umpires: Ian Lock and Sam Nogajski
Player of the match: Phillip Hughes (South Australia)

- Tasmania won the toss and elected to field
- Points: South Australia 5, Tasmania 0

=== November 2012 ===
7 November 2012
14:15 (D/N)
Scorecard

Western Australia; 181 (48.3 overs)	v	Victoria (H); 1/185 (33.2 overs)
Mitchell Marsh 51 (76); Jayde Herrick 5/51 (12.3 overs)		Aaron Finch 80 (89); Hilton Cartwright 1/33 (5.2 overs)

Victoria won by 9 wickets
Melbourne Cricket Ground, Melbourne
Umpires: Ashley Barrow and Paul Wilson
Player of the match: Jayde Herrick (Victoria)

- Western Australia won the toss and elected to bat
- List A debut: Hilton Cartwright (Western Australia)
- Points: Victoria 5, Western Australia 0

14 November 2012
14:15 (D/N)
Scorecard

(H) Tasmania; 275 (50 overs)	v	Queensland; 5/278 (49.5 overs)
George Bailey 102 (124); Nathan Hauritz 3/53 (11 overs)		Usman Khawaja 78 (91); James Faulkner 2/78 (11 overs)

Queensland won by 5 wickets
Bellerive Oval, Hobart
Umpires: Geoff Joshua and Sam Nogajski
Player of the match: Nathan Reardon (Queensland)

- Queensland won the toss and elected to field
- Points: Queensland 4, Tasmania 0

17 November 2012
11:15
Scorecard

South Australia; 9/219 (50 overs)	v	Western Australia (H); 205 (47.5 overs)
Alex Ross 62 (73); Nathan Coulter-Nile 3/40 (11 overs)		Sam Whiteman 74 (96); Daniel Christian 3/62 (13 overs)

South Australia won by 14 runs
Western Australia Cricket Association Ground, Perth, Western Australia
Umpires: Nathan Johnstone and John Ward
Player of the match: Alex Ross (South Australia)

- South Australia won the toss and elected to bat
- Points: South Australia 4, Western Australia 0

18 November 2012
11:15
Scorecard

(H) New South Wales; 350 (49.3 overs)	v	Victoria; 4/352 (46.4 overs)
Steve Smith 92 (68); Scott Boland 4/85 (13 overs)		David Hussey 140 (84); Moisés Henriques 2/66 (11 overs)

Victoria won by 6 wickets
Sydney Cricket Ground, Sydney
Umpires: Gerard Abood and Tony Ward
Player of the match: Aaron Finch ( Victoria)

- Victoria won the toss and elected to field
- Points: Victoria 4, New South Wales 0

21 November 2012
13:15 (D/N)
Scorecard

(H) Queensland; 8/252 (50 overs)	v	New South Wales; 142 all out (36.5 overs)
Peter Forrest 62 (96); Steve O'Keefe 3/65 (13 overs)		Brad Haddin 31 (58); Alister McDermoot 3/26 (10.5 overs)

Queensland won by 110 runs
Brisbane Cricket Ground, Woolloongabba, Brisbane
Umpires: Ashley Barrow Paul Reiffel
Player of the match: Matthew Gale (Queensland)

- Queensland won the toss and elected to bat
- Points: Queensland 5, New South Wales 0

28 November 2012
14:15 (D/N)
Scorecard

(H) Victoria; 8/241 (50 overs)	v	South Australia; 6/246 (46.2 overs)
Peter Handscomb 65 (72); Gary Putland 4/44 (12 overs)		Michael Klinger 88 (107); Scott Boland 5/63 (11 overs)

South Australia won by 4 wickets
Melbourne Cricket Ground, Melbourne
Umpires: Mick Martell Damien Mealey
Player of the match: Gary Putland (South Australia)

- Victoria won the toss and elected to bat
- Points: South Australia 4, Victoria 0

=== December 2012 ===
1 December 2012
10:30 (D/N)
Scorecard

(H) Tasmania; 8/192 (50 overs)	v	Western Australia; 107 (36.3 overs)
James Faulkner 66 (88); Michael Hogan 4/37 (13 overs)		Marcus North 23 (52); James Faulkner 4/32 (13 overs)

Tasmania won by 85 runs
West Park Oval, Burnie
Umpires: Ashley Barrow Tony Ward
Player of the match: James Faulkner (Tasmania)

- Tasmania won the toss and elected to bat
- List A debut: Jordan Silk (Tasmania)
- Points: Tasmania 5, Western Australia 0

2 December 2012
10:30 (D/N)
Scorecard

Queensland; 6/292 (50 overs)	v	New South Wales (H); 262 (47.2 overs)
Chris Hartley 87 (109); Moisés Henriques 3/67 (13 overs)		Ben Rohrer 80 (60); Cameron Gannon 5/38 (11.2 overs)

Queensland won by 30 runs
Manuka Oval, Canberra
Umpires: Paul Reiffel Derek Walker
Player of the match: Chris Hartley (Queensland)

- New South Wales won the toss and elected to field
- List A debut: Adam Zampa (New South Wales)
- Points: Queensland 4, New South Wales 0

=== January 2013 ===
27 January 2013
13:15 (D/N)
Scorecard

(H) Queensland	v	Tasmania

Match abandoned without a ball bowled
Brisbane Cricket Ground, Woolloongabba, Brisbane
Umpires: Geoff Joshua and John Ward

- Points: Queensland 2, Tasmania 2

30 January 2013
14:15 (D/N)
Scorecard

Western Australia; 7/266 (50 overs)	v	New South Wales (H); 155 (45.1 overs)
Adam Voges 77* (82); Gurinder Sandhu 3/64 (12 overs)		Stephen O'Keefe 34 (62); Michael Hogan 3/29 (11 overs)

Western Australia won by 111 runs
Sydney Cricket Ground, Sydney
Umpires: Gerard Abood and Damien Mealey
Player of the match: Adam Voges (Western Australia

- New South Wales won the toss and elected to field
- Points: Western Australia 5, New South Wales 0
- List A debuts: Gurinder Sandhu (New South Wales); Ashton Agar, Joel Paris and John Rogers (Western Australia)

=== February 2013 ===
2 February 2013
13:15 (D/N)
Scorecard

Western Australia; 4/308 (50 overs)	v	Queensland (H); 198 (43.4 overs)
Shaun Marsh 155* (147); Matthew Gale 3/50 (11 overs)		Nathan Reardon 58 (50); Jason Behrendorff 3/39 (12 overs)

Western Australia won by 110 runs
Brisbane Cricket Ground, Woolloongabba, Brisbane
Umpires: Ashley Barrow and Damien Mealey
Player of the match: Shaun Marsh (Western Australia)

- Western Australia won the toss and elected to bat
- Points: Western Australia 5, Queensland 0

9 February 2013
13:45 (D/N)
Scorecard

(H) South Australia; 7/255 (50 overs)	v	Victoria; 8/256 (49.3 overs)
Callum Ferguson 110 (125); Fawad Ahmed 3/47 (13 overs)		David Hussey 87 (86); Kane Richardson 5/61 (13 overs)

Victoria won by 2 wickets
Adelaide Oval, Adelaide
Umpires: Ian Lock and John Ward
Player of the match: John Hastings (Victoria)

- South Australia won the toss and elected to bat
- Points: Victoria 4, South Australia 0

11 February 2013
14:15 (D/N)
Scorecard

New South Wales; 4/246 (50 overs)	v	Tasmania (H); 209 (45.3 overs)
David Dawson 124* (139); Matt Johnston 2/39 (8 overs)		Jordan Silk 54 (71); Gurinder Sandhu 5/35 (9.3 overs)

New South Wales won by 37 runs
Bellerive Oval, Hobart
Umpires: Gerard Abood and Geoff Joshua
Player of the match: David Dawson (New South Wales)

- New South Wales won the toss and elected to bat
- Points: New South Wales 4, Tasmania 0
- List A debuts: Daniel Hughes (New South Wales) and Harrison Allanby (Tasmania)

14 February 2013
14:15 (D/N)
Scorecard

(H) New South Wales; 8/264 (50 overs)	v	South Australia; 8/208 (50 overs)
Nic Maddinson 85 (74); Kane Richardson 6/51 (13 overs)		Callum Ferguson 78 (119); Gurinder Sandhu 3/50 (12 overs)

New South Wales won by 56 runs
Sydney Cricket Ground, Sydney
Umpires: Sam Nogajski and Paul Wilson
Player of the match: Nic Maddinson (New South Wales)

- New South Wales won the toss and elected to bat
- Points: New South Wales 5, South Australia 0
- List A debuts: Travis Head and Chadd Sayers (South Australia)

16 February 2013
14:15 (D/N)
Scorecard

(H) Victoria; 8/242 (50 overs)	v	Queensland; 4/243 (47.4 overs)
Michael Hill 88 (104); Matthew Gale 5/67 (11 overs)		Chris Hartley 74 (115); Will Sheridan 2/42 (8 overs)

Queensland won by 6 wickets
Melbourne Cricket Ground, Melbourne
Umpires: Ian Lock and Tony Ward
Player of the match: Nathan Reardon (Queensland)

- Victoria won the toss and elected to bat
- Points: Queensland 4, Victoria 0
- List A debut: Dominic Michael (Queensland)

17 February 2013
13:45 (D/N)
Scorecard

(H) South Australia; 8/266 (50 overs)	v	New South Wales; 248 (48 overs)
Brad Haddin 125 (112); Jake Haberfield 2/35 (6 overs)		Johan Botha 53 (56); Sean Abbott 3/48 (11 overs)

New South Wales won by 18 runs
Adelaide Oval, Adelaide
Umpires: Simon Fry and Mick Martel
Player of the match: Brad Haddin (New South Wales)

- New South Wales won the toss and elected to bat
- Points: New South Wales 4, South Australia 0
- List A debut: Alex Carey (South Australia)

19 February 2013
11:15
Scorecard

Tasmania; 6/307 (50 overs)	v	Western Australia (H); 256 (43.3 overs)
Ricky Ponting 95 (105); Burt Cockley 2/91 (13 overs)		Mitchell Marsh 104 (96); James Faulkner 3/62 (11 overs)

Tasmania won by 51 runs
Western Australia Cricket Association Ground, Perth, Western Australia
Umpires: Ian Lock and Sam Nogajski
Player of the match: James Faulkner (Tasmania)

- Western Australia won the toss and elected to field
- Points: Tasmania 4, Western Australia 0
- List A debut: Ashton Turner (Western Australia)

== Final ==
27 February 2013
14:15 (D/N)
Scorecard

Queensland; 9/146 (32/32 overs)	v	Victoria (H); 144 (31.4/32 overs)
Jason Floros 47 (32); Clint McKay 2/24 (8 overs)		Peter Handscomb 42 (50); Ryan Harris 4/26 (7.4 overs)

Queensland won by 2 runs (D/L)
Melbourne Cricket Ground, Melbourne
Umpires: Simon Fry and John Ward
Player of the match: Ryan Harris (Queensland)

- Victoria won the toss and elected to field
- Match reduced to 32 overs per side
- Queensland won the 2012–13 Ryobi One-Day Cup
