= 2011–12 Ryobi One-Day Cup =

2011–12 National One Day Cup
- Administrator: Cricket Australia
- Cricket format: Limited overs cricket
- Tournament format: Round-robin tournament
- Champions: Southern Redbacks (3rd title)
- Participants: 6
- Matches: 25
- Most runs: Michael Klinger (South Australia) (498)
- Most wickets: Alister McDermott (Queensland) (16)

The 2011–12 Ryobi One-Day Cup was the 42nd season of official List A domestic cricket in Australia.

The season's format reverted to the 50-overs a side format, with Cricket Australia acknowledging the ICC's commitment to 50-over cricket and the 2015 ICC World Cup most likely be staged as a 50-over tournament. Unlike previous seasons, the competition was not a "complete double round robin", and each state played eight preliminary matches instead of ten.

The 2011–12 competition was won by the South Australian Redbacks. The final's result was a tie, but the Redbacks had gained a "bonus point" in the round robin series that put them ahead of the Tasmanian Tigers. The win was South Australia's first One-day domestic title in 25 years.

== Table ==
Pos	Team	Pld	W	L	T	NR	BP	Pts	NRR
1	Southern Redbacks	8	6	2	0	0	3	27	0.470
2	Tasmanian Tigers	8	6	2	0	0	2	26	0.211
3	New South Wales Blues	8	4	4	0	0	1	17	0.171
4	Queensland Bulls	8	4	4	0	0	1	17	0.018
5	Victorian Bushrangers	8	3	5	0	0	1	13	−0.144
6	Western Warriors	8	1	7	0	0	0	4	−0.741

== Fixtures ==
=== October 2011 ===
9 October 2011
Scorecard

(home team) Queensland; 7/269 (50 overs)	v	Victoria; 238 (48.5 overs)
Peter Forrest 81 (96); Peter Siddle 3/49 (12 overs)		Robert Quiney 57 (67); Steve Magoffin 3/59 (12 overs)

Queensland won by 31 runs
Brisbane Cricket Ground, Woolloongabba, Brisbane
Umpires: Simon Fry and Paul Reiffel
Player of the match: Peter Forrest (Queensland)

- Victoria won the toss and elected to field.
- List A debut: Peter Handscomb (Victoria)
- Points: Queensland 4, Victoria 0

15 October 2011
Scorecard

New South Wales; 3/261 (49/49 overs)	v	South Australia (home team); 3/262 (48/49 overs)
Usman Khawaja 116 (138); Gary Putland 2/64 (9 overs)		Tom Cooper 100* (99); Moisés Henriques 1/34 (8 overs)

South Australia won by 7 wickets
Adelaide Oval, Adelaide
Umpires: Ashley Barrow and Paul Wilson
Player of the match: Tom Cooper (South Australia)

- New South Wales won the toss and elected to bat.
- Rain delayed the start of play and reduced play to 49 overs per side.
- List A debut: Luke Doran (NSW) and Joe Mennie (South Australia)
- Points: South Australia 4, New South Wales 0

16 October 2011
Scorecard

Tasmania; 231 (49.2 overs)	v	Western Australia (home team); 164 (34.4 overs)
Mark Cosgrove 43 (51); Nathan Coulter-Nile 4/66 (12 overs)		Liam Davis 38 (32); Evan Gulbis 4/8 (5 overs)

Tasmania won by 67 runs
Western Australia Cricket Association Ground, Perth, Western Australia
Umpires: Mick Martell and John Ward
Player of the match: Evan Gulbis (Tasmania)

- Western Australia won the toss and elected to field.
- List A debut: Cameron Bancroft (Western Australia)
- Points: Tasmania 5, Western Australia 0

22 October 2011
Scorecard

(home team) Queensland; 8/262 (50 overs)	v	Tasmania; 8/257 (50 overs)
Ryan Broad 92 (120); James Faulkner 3/56 (12 overs)		Ed Cowan 65 (92); Alister McDermott 3/62 (13 overs)

Queensland won by 5 runs
Ray Mitchell Oval, Mackay
Umpires: Damien Mealey and John Ward
Player of the match: Ryan Broad (Queensland)

- Queensland won the toss and elected to bat.
- List A debut: Graeme Skennar (Queensland)
- Points: Queensland 4, Tasmania 0

23 October 2011
Scorecard

Western Australia; 7/233 (50 overs)	v	South Australia (home team); 8/235 (48 overs)
Luke Ronchi 113* (101); Gary Putland 3/52 (10 overs)		Callum Ferguson 110* (129); Michael Beer 3/39 (13 overs)

South Australia won by 2 wickets
Adelaide Oval, Adelaide
Umpires: Gerard Abood and Simon Fry
Player of the match: Callum Ferguson (South Australia)

- South Australia won the toss and elected to field.
- Points: South Australia 4, Western Australia 0

30 October 2011
Scorecard

Victoria; 7/317 (49/49 overs)	v	New South Wales (home team); 3/318 (40.3/49 overs)
Brad Hodge 144 (123); Moisés Henriques 3/68 (13 overs)		Daniel Smith 179* (122); Cameron White 1/24 (3 overs)

New South Wales won by 7 wickets
North Sydney Oval, North Sydney
Umpires: Ian Lock and John Ward
Player of the match: Daniel Smith (New South Wales)

- New South Wales won the toss and elected to field.
- Rain delayed the start of play and reduced play to 49 overs per side.
- List A debut: Jayde Herrick (Victoria)
- Points: New South Wales 4, Victoria 0

=== November 2011 ===
2 November 2011
Scorecard

(home team) Tasmania; 6/222 (50 overs)	v	Victoria; 9/220 (50 overs)
Nick Kruger 71 (117); Jon Holland 2/31 (10 overs)		Cameron White 36 (54); Xavier Doherty 3/57 (13 overs)

Tasmania won by 2 runs
Bellerive Oval, Hobart
Umpires: Simon Fry and Geoff Joshua
Player of the match: James Faulkner (Tasmania)

- Victoria won the toss and elected to field.
- List A debut: James Faulkner (Tasmania)
- Points: Tasmania 4, Victoria 0

4 November 2011
Scorecard

(home team) New South Wales; 8/261 (50 overs)	v	South Australia; 238 (50 overs)
David Warner 86 (98); Daniel Christian 3/59 (13 overs)		Adam Crosthwaite 72 (104); Doug Bollinger 4/62 (13 overs)

New South Wales won by 23 runs
Sydney Cricket Ground, Sydney
Umpires: Michael Kumutat and Bob Parry
Player of the match: David Warner (New South Wales)

- New South Wales won the toss and elected to bat.
- Points: New South Wales 4, South Australia 0

6 November 2011
Scorecard

(home team) Western Australia; 229 (49.4 overs)	v	Queensland; 7/233 (49 overs)
Marcus North 55 (79); Alister McDermott 5/64 (11.4 overs)		Ben Dunk 115 (124); Mitchell Marsh 4/40 (11 overs)

Queensland won by 3 wickets
Western Australia Cricket Association Ground, Perth, Western Australia
Umpires: Nathan Johnstone and Paul Reiffel
Player of the match: Ben Dunk (Queensland)

- Queensland won the toss and elected to field.
- Points: Queensland 4, Western Australia 0

13 November 2011
Scorecard

(home team) Tasmania; 8/212 (42/45 overs)	v	South Australia; 169 (36.4/40 overs)
Ed Cowan 91* (103); Kane Richardson 3/43 (10 overs)		Tom Cooper 66 (80); Ben Hilfenhaus 4/24 (9 overs)

Tasmania won by 48 runs (D/L)
West Park Oval, Burnie
Umpires: Paul Reiffel and Paul Wilson
Player of the match: Ed Cowan (Tasmania)

- South Australia won the toss and elected to field.
- Rain stopped the Tasmania innings after 42 overs and set South Australia a target of 218 runs from 40 overs.
- Tasmania 5, South Australia 0

16 November 2011
Scorecard

(home team) Victoria; 5/317 (50 overs)	v	Western Australia; 258 (45.2 overs)
Matthew Wade 120 (130); Ben Edmondson 3/87 (11 overs)		Wes Robinson 66 (95); James Pattinson 3/31 (10.2 overs)

Victoria won by 59 runs
Melbourne Cricket Ground, Melbourne
Umpires: Ashley Barrow and John Ward
Player of the match: Matthew Wade (Victoria)

- Victoria won the toss and elected to bat.
- Points: Victoria 4, Western Australia 0
- Western Australia: Adam Voges retired hurt and Marcus North was unable to bat due to an injury.

20 November 2011
Scorecard

(home team) Queensland; 221 (48.5 overs)	v	New South Wales; 171 (43.5 overs)
Chris Lynn 61 (71); Mitchell Starc 5/39 (12.5 overs)		Moisés Henriques 38 (58); Cameron Gannon 2/26 (7 overs)

Queensland won by 50 runs
Brisbane Cricket Ground, Woolloongabba, Brisbane
Umpires: Simon Fry and Sam Nogajski
Player of the match: Mitchell Starc (New South Wales)

- Queensland won the toss and elected to bat.
- List A debut: Josh Lalor (New South Wales)
- Points: Queensland 5, New South Wales 0

23 November 2011
Scorecard

Queensland; 194 (49.3 overs)	v	South Australia (home team); 3/195 (38.4 overs)
Michael Neser 56 (69); Jake Haberfield 4/50 (13 overs)		Michael Klinger 105 (122); Bradley Ipson 2/47 (9 overs)

South Australia won by 7 wickets
Adelaide Oval, Adelaide
Umpires: Chris Gaffaney (NZ) and Ian Lock
Player of the match: Michael Klinger (South Australia)

- South Australia won the toss and elected to field.
- South Australia 5, Queensland 0

27 November 2011
Scorecard

(home team) Victoria; 6/321 (50 overs)	v	Tasmania; 247 (46.2 overs)
David Hussey 76 (49); Jason Krejza 2/69 (12 overs)		Tom Triffitt 72* (50); Jayde Herrick 4/69 (11 overs)

Victoria won by 74 runs
Melbourne Cricket Ground, Melbourne
Umpires: Gerard Abood and Ashley Barrow
Player of the match: Rob Quiney (Victoria)

- Tasmania won the toss and elected to field.
- Points: Victoria 5, Tasmania 0

30 November 2011
Scorecard

Western Australia; 199 (48.1 overs)	v	New South Wales (home team); 5/198 (43.2/46 overs)
Wes Robinson 87 (130); Trent Copeland 5/44 (12.1 overs)		Steve Smith 57 (84); D'Arcy Short 2/14 (4 overs)

New South Wales won by 5 wickets (D/L)
Sydney Cricket Ground, Sydney
Umpires: Geoff Joshua and Paul Wilson
Player of the match: Trent Copeland (New South Wales)

- Western Australia won the toss and elected to bat.
- Rain reduced the New South Wales innings and set a target of 194 runs from 46 overs.
- List A debut: Timm van der Gugten (New South Wales) and D'Arcy Short (Western Australia)
- Points: New South Wales 4, Western Australia 0

=== December 2011 ===
4 December 2011
Scorecard

Tasmania; 188 (49.4 overs)	v	New South Wales (home team); 9/184 (50 overs)
George Bailey 35 (54); Luke Doran 4/40 (13 overs)		Moisés Henriques 65* (71); Ben Laughlin 6/53 (13 overs)

Tasmania won by 4 runs
Manuka Oval, Canberra
Umpires: Michael Kumutat and Mick Martell
Player of the match: Ben Laughlin (Tasmania)

- Tasmania won the toss and elected to bat.
- Points: Tasmania: 4, New South Wales 0

7 December 2011
Scorecard

(home team) Victoria; 237 (48.4 overs)	v	Queensland; 225 (48.1 overs)
Aaron Finch 71 (106); Alister McDermott 4/30 (10.4 overs)		Nathan Reardon 53 (80); Andrew McDonald 5/38 (9.1 overs)

Victoria won by 12 runs
Melbourne Cricket Ground, Melbourne
Umpires: Geoff Joshua and Paul Reiffel
Player of the match: Glenn Maxwell (Victoria)

- Victoria won the toss and elected to bat.
- List A debut: Scott Boland (Victoria)
- Points: Victoria 4, Queensland 0

10 December 2011
Scorecard

(home team) Western Australia; 8/252 (50 overs)	v	South Australia; 4/253 (39.1 overs)
Luke Ronchi 101* (83); Kane Richardson 3/43 (10 overs)		Daniel Harris 58 (72); Ryan Duffield 2/81 (10 overs)

South Australia won by 6 wickets
Western Australia Cricket Association Ground, Perth, Western Australia
Umpires: Gerard Abood and Nathan Johnstone
Player of the match: Kane Richardson (South Australia)

- South Australia won the toss and elected to field.
- Points: South Australia 5, Western Australia 0

=== February 2012 ===
4 February 2012
Scorecard

New South Wales; 230 (47.5 overs)	v	Tasmania (home team); 7/231 (44.5 overs)
Usman Khawaja 100 (106); Jason Krejza 6/55 (11.5 overs)		George Bailey 94 (99); Scott Coyte 6/60 (12.5 overs)

Tasmania won by 3 wickets
Bellerive Oval, Hobart
Umpires: Ashley Barrow and Damien Mealey
Player of the match: Jason Krejza (Tasmania)

- New South Wales won the toss and elected to bat.
- List A debut: Jackson Bird and Ashton May (Tasmania)
- Points: Tasmania 4, New South Wales 0

7 February 2012
Scorecard

Victoria; 123 (37.2 overs)	v	South Australia (home team); 9/124 (35.2 overs)
Ryan Carters 44 (66); Jake Haberfield 4/30 (9.2 overs)		Tom Cooper 60* (75); Jon Holland 6/29 (13 overs)

South Australia won by 1 wicket
Adelaide Oval, Adelaide
Umpires: Bob Parry and John Ward
Player of the match: Jon Holland (Victoria)

- Victoria won the toss and elected to bat.
- List A debut: Daniel Salpietro (Victoria)
- Points: South Australia 5, Victoria 0

11 February 2012
Scorecard

Western Australia; 9/284 (50 overs)	v	Queensland (home team); 279 (50 overs)
Marcus North 93 (95); Ben Cutting 4/68 (113 overs)		Nathan Reardon 116 (113); Jason Behrendorff 3/45 (8 overs)

Western Australia won by 5 runs
Brisbane Cricket Ground, Woolloongabba, Brisbane
Umpires: Simon Fry and Adrian Holdstock
Player of the match: Nathan Reardon (Queensland)

- Western Australia won the toss and elected to bat.
- Western Australia 4, Queensland 0

15 February 2012
Scorecard

Queensland; 9/282 (50 overs)	v	Tasmania (home team); 3/283 (47/2 overs)
Chris Lynn 98 (100); Jackson Bird 2/20 (7 overs)		Ed Cowan 125 (107); Alister McDermott 1/26 (8 overs)

Tasmania won by 7 wicket
Bellerive Oval, Hobart
Umpires: Geoff Joshua and Ian Lock
Player of the match: Ed Cowan (Tasmania)

- Tasmania won the toss and elected to field.
- List A debut: Matthew Gale (Queensland)
- Points: Tasmania 4, Queensland 0

18 February 2012
Scorecard

South Australia; 7/277 (50 overs)	v	Victoria (home team); 229 (44.2 overs)
Michael Klinger 112 (131); Cameron White 3/55 (9 overs)		Aaron Finch 63 (62); Jake Haberfield 3/36 (7.2 overs)

South Australia won by 48 runs
Melbourne Cricket Ground, Melbourne
Umpires: Mick Martell and John Ward
Player of the match: Michael Klinger (South Australia)

- Victoria won the toss and elected to field.
- List A debuts: Andrew Fekete, Alex Keath, and Clive Rose (Victoria)
- Points: South Australia 4, Victoria 0

22 February 2012
Scorecard

(home team) Western Australia; 151 (42.4 overs)	v	New South Wales; 6/152 (35.5 overs)
Nathan Coulter-Nile 53* (70); Mitchell Starc 4/39 (11.4 overs)		Phillip Hughes 58* (81); Nathan Coulter-Nile 3/44 (12 overs)

New South Wales won by 4 wickets
Western Australia Cricket Association Ground, Perth, Western Australia
Umpires: Ashley Barrow and John Ward
Player of the match: Nathan Coulter-Nile (Western Australia)

- New South Wales won the toss and elected to field.
- List A debuts: Chris Tremain (New South Wales) and Tim Armstrong (Western Australia
- Points: New South Wales 5, Western Australia 0

== Final ==
25 February 2012
Scorecard

(home team) South Australia; 285 (49.4 overs)	v	Tasmania; 4/285 (50 overs)
Michael Klinger 81 (105); James Faulkner 4/75 (12 overs)		George Bailey 101 (105); Nathan Lyon 3/86 (13 overs)

Match tied
Adelaide Oval, Adelaide
Umpires: Paul Reiffel and John Ward
Player of the match: George Bailey (Tasmania)

- South Australia won the toss and elected to bat.
- South Australia won the 2011–12 Ryobi One-Day Cup due to more points accumulated in the round robin tournament.
