= 2012–13 Big Bash League season =

2nd season of the Big Bash League

2012–13 Big Bash League
- Dates: 7 December 2012 – 19 January 2013
- Administrator: Cricket Australia
- Cricket format: Twenty20
- Tournament format(s): Group stage and knockout
- Champions: Brisbane Heat (1st title)
- Participants: 8
- Matches: 35
- Attendance: 503,262 (14,379 per match)
- Player of the series: Aaron Finch (Melbourne Renegades)
- Most runs: Shaun Marsh (412), (Perth Scorchers)
- Most wickets: Ben Laughlin (14), (Hobart Hurricanes)

The 2012–13 Big Bash League season or BBL|02 was the second season of the Big Bash League, the top-class Twenty20 cricket competition in Australia. The tournament began on 7 December 2012, with the final held on 19 January 2013.

Defending champions, Sydney Sixers were knocked out in the group stage. Melbourne Renegades finished first in the group stage with seven wins. Perth Scorchers, Melbourne Stars and Brisbane Heat were the other teams to reach the semi-finals. In the first semi-final, Brisbane defeated Melbourne Renegades by 15 runs; in the other semi-final, Perth defeated Melbourne Stars by eight wickets in a rain curtailed match to make the final for the second year in a row. In the final, Brisbane beat Perth by 34 runs to win their first title. Perth Scorchers finished runners-up for the second successive year.

The two finalists, Perth Scorchers and Brisbane Heat qualified for the 2013 Champions League Twenty20.

== Personnel signings ==
The official window for signing players lasted between 9 July and 20 July 2012. Each team had a salary cap of A$1 million and could sign a maximum of 18 players and a minimum of 14, including up to two international players. The minimum playing contract was set at A$20,000. Unlike the inaugural season, Cricket Australia allowed players the opportunity to sign multi-year contracts.

== Format ==
This season featured the same number of teams as the previous season, but included an expanded group stage of 35 matches. Each team played eight group-stage matches with the four best performing teams from the group stage advancing to the semi-final stage.

The rules for the tournament deviated from those in the laws of cricket where any no-ball will be followed by a free hit.

== League stage ==
=== Points table ===
Pos	Team	Pld	W	L	NR	Pts	NRR	Qualification
1	Melbourne Renegades	8	7	1	0	14	0.791	Advanced to semi-finals
2	Perth Scorchers	8	5	3	0	10	1.322	Advanced to semi-finals
3	Melbourne Stars	8	5	3	0	10	0.246	Advanced to semi-finals
4	Brisbane Heat (C)	8	4	4	0	8	0.464	Advanced to semi-finals
5	Adelaide Strikers	8	4	4	0	8	−0.162	
6	Hobart Hurricanes	8	4	4	0	8	−0.569	
7	Sydney Sixers	8	3	5	0	6	−0.380	
8	Sydney Thunder	8	0	8	0	0	−1.360	

(C) Champions

=== Match summary ===
Visitor team →	ADS	BRH	HBH	MLR	MLS	PRS	SYS	SYT
Home team ↓	ADS	BRH	HBH	MLR	MLS	PRS	SYS	SYT
Adelaide Strikers		Heat; 3 wickets			Stars; 8 runs	Scorchers; 98 runs	Strikers; 9 wickets	
Brisbane Heat			Hurricanes; 8 wickets		Heat; 24 runs	Scorchers; 9 wickets	Sixers; 5 wickets	
Hobart Hurricanes	Strikers; 38 runs	Heat; 8 wickets				Hurricanes; 6 wickets		Hurricanes; 30 runs
Melbourne Renegades	Renegades; 48 runs	Renegades; 6 wickets	Renegades; 7 wickets		Renegades; 8 wickets			
Melbourne Stars			Stars; 4 wickets	Renegades; 9 wickets			Stars; 21 runs	Stars; 13 runs
Perth Scorchers	Strikers; 6 wickets			Scorchers; 51 runs	Stars; 24 runs			Scorchers; 9 wickets
Sydney Sixers			Hurricanes; 7 wickets	Renegades; 29 runs		Scorchers; 7 wickets		Sixers; 7 wickets
Sydney Thunder	Strikers; 51 runs	Heat; 5 wickets		Renegades; 5 wickets			Sixers; 4 wickets	

Home team won	Visitor team won

- Note: Results listed are according to the home (horizontal) and visitor (vertical) teams.
- Note: Click on a result to see a summary of the match.

=== Matches ===
Times shown are in Australian Western Standard Time (UTC+08) for Perth, Australian Central Daylight Time (UTC+10:30) for Adelaide, Australian Eastern Standard Time (UTC+10:00) for Brisbane and Australian Eastern Daylight Time (UTC+11:00) for all remaining venues.

7 December
19:00 (D/N)
Scorecard

Melbourne Stars; 5/167 (20 overs)	v	Melbourne Renegades (H); 2/168 (18.2 overs)
Luke Wright 95 (41); Aaron O'Brien 2/27 (4 overs)		Aaron Finch 111* (65); Jackson Bird 1/29 (4 overs)

Melbourne Renegades won by 8 wickets
Etihad Stadium, Melbourne
Attendance: 23,589
Umpires: Simon Fry & Paul Reiffel
Player of the match: Aaron Finch (Melbourne Renegades)

- Melbourne Stars won the toss and elected to bat

8 December
19:00 (D/N)
Scorecard

Sydney Thunder; 5/143 (20 overs)	v	Sydney Sixers (H); 3/147 (18.4 overs)
Ryan Carters 33* (24); Luke Feldman 2/19 (4 overs)		Brad Haddin 59 (48); Chris Tremain 2/27 (4 overs)

Sydney Sixers won by 7 wickets
Sydney Cricket Ground
Attendance: 15,279
Umpires: Ashley Barrow & Tony Ward
Player of the match: Brad Haddin (Sydney Sixers)

- Sydney Sixers won the toss and elected to field
- Twenty20 debuts: Gurinder Sandhu & Chris Tremain (Sydney Thunder)

9 December
17:00 (D/N)
Scorecard

(H) Brisbane Heat; 6/172 (20 overs)	v	Hobart Hurricanes; 2/175 (19 overs)
Daniel Christian 49 (34); Evan Gulbis 3/29 (4 overs)		Travis Birt 57* (40); Ben Cutting 1/19 (3 overs)

Hobart Hurricanes won by 8 wickets
The Gabba, Woolloongabba, Brisbane
Attendance: 14,057
Umpires: Steve Davis & Damien Mealey
Player of the match: Travis Birt (Hobart)

- Brisbane Heat won the toss and elected to bat
- Twenty20 debuts: Joe Burns & Cameron Gannon (Brisbane Heat)

9 December
18:00 (D/N)
Scorecard

(H) Perth Scorchers; 6/162 (20 overs)	v	Adelaide Strikers; 4/164 (19.2 overs)
Adam Voges 58 (41); Gary Putland 2/39 (4 overs)		Phillip Hughes 74 (48); Joe Mennie 1/29 (4 overs)

Adelaide Strikers won by 6 wickets
WACA Ground, Perth
Attendance: 12,117
Umpires: Ian Lock & Paul Wilson
Player of the match: Phillip Hughes (Adelaide)

- Perth Scorchers won the toss and elected to bat

12 December
17:00 (D/N)
Scorecard

(H) Perth Scorchers; 69 (15.2 overs)	v	Melbourne Stars; 0/29 (2.0 overs)
Hilton Cartwright 17 (16); Lasith Malinga 6/7 (4 overs)		Luke Wright 23* (11)

Melbourne Stars won by 10 wickets (D/L)
WACA Ground, Perth
Attendance: 4,329
Umpires: Ian Lock & John Ward
Player of the match: Lasith Malinga (Melbourne Stars)

- Melbourne Stars won the toss and elected to field
- Twenty20 debuts: Peter Handscomb (Melbourne Stars), Hilton Cartwright & Marcus Stoinis (Perth Scorchers)

13 December
19:00 (D/N)
Scorecard

(H) Adelaide Strikers; 8/185 (20 overs)	v	Brisbane Heat; 7/186 (20 overs)
Callum Ferguson 52 (36); Thisara Perera 3/27 (4 overs)		Luke Pomersbach 65 (39); Kieron Pollard 2/38 (4 overs)

Brisbane Heat won by 3 wickets
Adelaide Oval
Attendance: 10,546
Umpires: Damien Mealey & Paul Wilson
Player of the match: Luke Pomersbach (Brisbane)

- Brisbane Heat won the toss and elected to field
- Twenty20 debut: Cameron Boyce (Adelaide Strikers)

14 December
19:00 (D/N)
Scorecard

(H) Sydney Thunder; 7/116 (20 overs)	v	Melbourne Renegades; 5/117 (18.2 overs)
Chris Tremain 37* (23); Aaron O'Brien 3/15 (3 overs)		Aaron Finch 31 (33); Azhar Mahmood 2/18 (4 overs)

Melbourne Renegades won by 5 wickets
ANZ Stadium, Sydney
Attendance: 7,413
Umpires: Ashley Barrow & Tony Ward
Player of the match: Aaron O'Brien (Melbourne Renegades)

- Melbourne Renegades won the toss and elected to field

15 December
19:00 (D/N)
Scorecard

Hobart Hurricanes; 8/134 (20 overs)	v	Melbourne Stars (H); 6/135 (19.1 overs)
Tim Paine 46 (46); Clint McKay 3/24 (4 overs)		Rob Quiney 35 (31); Ben Laughlin 3/14 (4 overs)

Melbourne Stars won by 4 wickets
Melbourne Cricket Ground
Attendance: 11,184
Umpires: Geoff Joshua & Mick Martell
Player of the match: Clint McKay (Melbourne Stars)

- Melbourne Stars won the toss and elected to field

16 December
19:00 (D/N)
Scorecard

(H) Sydney Sixers; 9/113 (20 overs)	v	Perth Scorchers; 3/114 (19.2 overs)
Stephen O'Keefe 29 (34); Michael Beer 2/19 (4 overs)		Herschelle Gibbs 40 (42); Luke Feldman 1/13 (3.2 overs)

Perth Scorchers won by 7 wickets
Sydney Cricket Ground
Attendance: 9,057
Umpires: Gerard Abood & Tony Ward
Player of the match: Michael Beer (Perth)

- Perth Scorchers won the toss and elected to field

18 December
18:30 (D/N)
Scorecard

(H) Brisbane Heat; 4/109 (13.1 overs)	v	Perth Scorchers; 1/51 (4.2 overs)
Chris Lynn 51 (29); Alfonso Thomas 3/15 (3 overs)		Nathan Coulter-Nile 23* (6); James Hopes 1/6 (1 over)

Perth Scorchers won by 9 wickets (D/L)
The Gabba, Woolloongabba, Brisbane
Attendance: 10,600
Umpires: Damien Mealey & Paul Reiffel
Player of the match: Nathan Coulter-Nile (Perth)

- Perth Scorchers won the toss and elected to field

19 December
19:00 (D/N)
Scorecard

Hobart Hurricanes; 9/102 (20 overs)	v	Melbourne Renegades (H); 3/103 (13.2 overs)
Ricky Ponting 25 (25); Nathan Rimmington 3/18 (4 overs)		Aaron Finch 46* (40); Xavier Doherty 2/17 (4 overs)

Melbourne Renegades won by 7 wickets
Etihad Stadium, Melbourne
Attendance: 7,951
Umpires: Sam Nogajski & John Ward
Player of the match: Marlon Samuels (Melbourne Renegades)

- Melbourne Renegades won the toss and elected to field

20 December
19:00 (D/N)
Scorecard

Adelaide Strikers; 6/177 (20 overs)	v	Sydney Thunder (H); 126 (18.4 overs)
Michael Klinger 60 (46); Dirk Nannes 4/17 (4 overs)		Scott Coyte 33 (15); Kane Richardson 3/9 (3.4 overs)

Adelaide Strikers won by 51 runs
ANZ Stadium, Sydney
Attendance: 4,101
Umpires: Bruce Oxenford & Paul Reiffel
Player of the match: Kane Richardson (Adelaide)

- Sydney Thunder won the toss and elected to field
- Twenty20 debut: Adam Zampa (Sydney Thunder)

21 December
19:00 (D/N)
Scorecard

(H) Melbourne Stars; 6/177 (20 overs)	v	Sydney Sixers; 5/156 (20 overs)
Glenn Maxwell 82 (50); Ian Moran 3/30 (3 overs)		Steve O'Keefe 42 (35); Shane Warne 2/32 (4 overs)

Melbourne Stars won by 21 runs
Melbourne Cricket Ground, Melbourne
Attendance: 14,260
Umpires: Ashley Barrow & Tony Ward
Player of the match: Glenn Maxwell (Melbourne Stars)

- Sydney Sixers won the toss and elected to field
- Twenty20 debut: Scott Henry (Melbourne Stars)

22 December
19:00 (D/N)
Scorecard

Brisbane Heat; 7/133 (20 overs)	v	Melbourne Renegades (H); 4/137 (19.1 overs)
Thisara Perera 38 (24); Muttiah Muralitharan 2/22 (4 overs)		Aaron Finch 33 (34); Ben Cutting 2/12 (4 overs)

Melbourne Renegades won by 6 wickets
Etihad Stadium, Melbourne
Attendance: 7,023
Umpires: Gerard Abood & Bruce Oxenford
Player of the match: Ben Cutting (Brisbane)

- Brisbane Heat won the toss and elected to bat

23 December
16:30
Scorecard

(H) Hobart Hurricanes; 4/177 (20 overs)	v	Sydney Thunder; 9/147 (20 overs)
Ricky Ponting 63 (45); Adam Zampa 3/26 (4 overs)		Simon Keen 24 (12); Xavier Doherty 3/32 (4 overs)

Hobart Hurricanes won by 30 runs
Bellerive Oval, Hobart
Attendance: 12,209
Umpires: Tony Ward & John Ward
Player of the match: Ricky Ponting (Hobart)

- Sydney Thunder won the toss and elected to field

23 December
19:00 (D/N)
Scorecard

Sydney Sixers; 6/135 (20 overs)	v	Adelaide Strikers (H); 1/136 (15.5 overs)
Steve Smith 58 (43); Shaun Tait 2/13 (3 overs)		Tim Ludeman 71 (43); Stephen O'Keefe 1/24 (2.5 overs)

Adelaide Strikers won by 9 wickets
Adelaide Oval
Attendance: 11,730
Umpires: Simon Fry & Sam Nogajski
Player of the match: Tim Ludeman (Adelaide)

- Sydney Sixers won the toss and elected to bat
- Twenty20 debut: Brad Young (Adelaide Strikers)

26 December
19:00 (D/N)
Scorecard

(H) Sydney Sixers; 8/154 (20 overs)	v	Hobart Hurricanes; 3/158 (19.5 overs)
Michael Lumb 34 (22); Ben Laughlin 4/31 (4 overs)		Ricky Ponting 63 (52); Luke Feldman 2/21 (4 overs)

Hobart Hurricanes won by 7 wickets
Sydney Cricket Ground
Attendance: 11,005
Umpires: Steve Davis & Damien Mealey
Player of the match: Ricky Ponting (Hobart)

- Hobart Hurricanes won the toss and elected to field
- Twenty20 debuts: Daniel Hughes & Kurtis Patterson (Sydney Sixers)

27 December
19:00 (D/N)
Scorecard

Melbourne Stars; 8/175 (20 overs)	v	Adelaide Strikers (H); 4/167 (20 overs)
Brad Hodge 88 (58); Shaun Tait 2/36 (4 overs)		Kieron Pollard 65* (43); James Faulkner 2/32 (4 overs)

Melbourne Stars won by 8 runs
Adelaide Oval
Attendance: 15,344
Umpires: Geoff Joshua & Ian Lock
Player of the match: Brad Hodge (Melbourne Stars)

- Melbourne Stars won the toss and elected to bat
- Twenty20 debut: Clive Rose (Melbourne Stars)

28 December
19:00 (D/N)
Scorecard

(H) Sydney Thunder; 126 (20 overs)	v	Brisbane Heat; 5/127 (16.4 overs)
Chris Gayle 28 (28); Daniel Christian 5/26 (4 overs)		Chris Lynn 51* (38); Chris Tremain 2/27 (4 overs)

Brisbane Heat won by 5 wickets
ANZ Stadium, Sydney
Attendance: 8,610
Umpires: Steve Davis & Paul Reiffel
Player of the match: Daniel Christian (Brisbane)

- Sydney Thunder won the toss and elected to bat

29 December
18:00 (D/N)
Scorecard

(H) Perth Scorchers; 3/187 (20 overs)	v	Melbourne Renegades; 136 (19.1 overs)
Shaun Marsh 85 (52); Will Sheridan 1/22 (3 overs)		Ben Rohrer 52 (33); Alfonso Thomas 4/8 (3 overs)

Perth Scorchers won by 51 runs
WACA Ground, Perth
Attendance: 14,000
Umpires: Geoff Joshua & Mick Martell
Player of the match: Shaun Marsh (Perth)

- Melbourne Renegades won the toss and elected to field
- Twenty20 debut: Jason Behrendorff (Perth Scorchers)

30 December
19:00 (D/N)
Scorecard

(H) Sydney Thunder; 6/132 (20 overs)	v	Sydney Sixers; 6/136 (19 overs)
Usman Khawaja 66 (47); Josh Lalor 2/20 (4 overs)		Daniel Hughes 51* (36); Dirk Nannes 3/24 (4 overs)

Sydney Sixers won by 4 wickets
ANZ Stadium, Sydney
Attendance: 20,986
Umpires: Gerard Abood & Ashley Barrow
Player of the match: Daniel Hughes (Sydney Sixers)

- Sydney Thunder won the toss and elected to bat

1 January
19:00 (D/N)
Scorecard

Perth Scorchers; 8/152 (20 overs)	v	Hobart Hurricanes (H); 4/153 (18.3 overs)
Simon Katich 66 (41); Ben Laughlin 3/19 (4 overs)		Tim Paine 74* (57); Brad Hogg 3/17 (4 overs)

Hobart Hurricanes won by 6 wickets
Bellerive Oval, Hobart
Attendance: 12,110
Umpires: Simon Fry & Paul Wilson
Player of the match: Tim Paine (Hobart)

- Perth Scorchers won the toss and elected to bat

2 January
19:00 (D/N)
Scorecard

(H) Melbourne Renegades; 6/155 (20 overs)	v	Adelaide Strikers; 107 (18.3 overs)
Tom Cooper 59 (46); Brad Young 2/37 (4 overs)		Johan Botha 31 (31); Muttiah Muralitharan 3/18 (4 overs)

Melbourne Renegades won by 48 runs
Etihad Stadium, Melbourne
Attendance: 14,174
Umpires: Paul Wilson and Sam Nogajski
Player of the match: Muttiah Muralitharan (Melbourne Renegades)

- Adelaide Strikers won the toss and elected to field

3 January
19:00 (D/N)
Scorecard

(H) Brisbane Heat; 5/171 (20 overs)	v	Melbourne Stars; 9/147 (20 overs)
James Hopes 49 (40); Lasith Malinga 3/26 (4 overs)		Luke Wright 34 (30); Thisara Perera 3/18 (2 overs)

Brisbane Heat won by 24 runs
The Gabba, Woolloongabba, Brisbane
Attendance: 24,570
Umpires: Ian Lock & Mick Martell
Player of the match: James Hopes (Brisbane)

- Melbourne Stars won the toss and elected to field

4 January
18:00 (D/N)
Scorecard

Sydney Thunder; 9/113 (20 overs)	v	Perth Scorchers (H); 1/117 (13.2 overs)
Usman Khawaja 56 (45); Brad Hogg 4/29 (4 overs)		Shaun Marsh 56* (45); Gurinder Sandhu 1/18 (4 overs)

Perth Scorchers won by 9 wickets
WACA Ground, Perth
Attendance: 15,708
Umpires: Damien Mealey & John Ward
Player of the match: Jason Behrendorff (Perth)

- Sydney Thunder won the toss and elected to bat

5 January
19:00 (D/N)
Scorecard

Adelaide Strikers; 4/162 (20 overs)	v	Hobart Hurricanes (H); 8/124 (20 overs)
Michael Klinger 71* (61); Xavier Doherty 1/25 (4 overs)		Tim Paine 33 (31); Cameron Boyce 3/17 (3 overs)

Adelaide Strikers won by 38 runs
Bellerive Oval, Hobart
Attendance: 12,009
Umpires: Geoff Joshua & Ian Lock
Player of the match: Cameron Boyce (Adelaide)

- Adelaide Strikers won the toss and elected to bat

6 January
19:00 (D/N)
Scorecard

(H) Melbourne Stars; 9/146 (20 overs)	v	Melbourne Renegades; 1/147 (18.5 overs)
Luke Wright 29 (22); Will Sheridan 3/36 (4 overs)		Aaron Finch 67* (47); Shane Warne 1/24 (4 overs)

Melbourne Renegades won by 9 wickets
Melbourne Cricket Ground, Melbourne
Attendance: 46,581
Umpires: Sam Nogajski & Simon Fry
Player of the match: Aaron Finch (Melbourne Renegades)

- Melbourne Stars won the toss and elected to bat

7 January
19:00 (D/N)
Scorecard

(H) Brisbane Heat; 9/127 (20 overs)	v	Sydney Sixers; 5/128 (19 overs)
Luke Pomersbach 37 (33); Stephen O'Keefe 3/21 (4 overs)		Michael Lumb 61* (55); Ben Cutting 2/9 (3 overs)

Sydney Sixers won by 5 wickets
The Gabba, Woolloongabba, Brisbane
Attendance: 14,362
Umpires: Bruce Oxenford & Damien Mealey
Player of the match: Michael Lumb (Sydney Sixers)

- Brisbane Heat won the toss and elected to bat

8 January
19:00 (D/N)
Scorecard

(H) Melbourne Stars; 8/145 (20 overs)	v	Sydney Thunder; 132 (19.4 overs)
Brad Hodge 39 (26); Chris Gayle 2/5 (1 over)		Chris Gayle 65 (43); James Faulkner 3/24 (3.4 overs)

Melbourne Stars won by 13 runs
Melbourne Cricket Ground Melbourne
Attendance: 13,680
Umpires: Geoff Joshua & Mick Martell
Player of the match: Chris Gayle (Sydney Thunder)

- Melbourne Stars won the toss and elected to bat

9 January
19:00 (D/N)
Scorecard

Melbourne Renegades; 5/178 (20 overs)	v	Sydney Sixers (H); 149 (20 overs)
Alex Hales 89 (52); Moisés Henriques 1/9 (1 over)		Stephen O'Keefe 41 (29); Nathan Rimmington 3/27 (4 overs)

Melbourne Renegades won by 29 runs
Sydney Cricket Ground
Attendance: 17,801
Umpires: Gerard Abood & Ashley Barrow
Player of the match: Alex Hales (Melbourne Renegades)

- Melbourne Renegades won the toss and elected to bat
- Twenty20 debut: Fawad Ahmed (Melbourne Renegades)

10 January
19:00 (D/N)
Scorecard

Perth Scorchers; 4/189 (20 overs)	v	Adelaide Strikers (H); 91 (18.3 overs)
Shaun Marsh 79 (60); Kane Richardson 2/42 (4 overs)		Kane Richardson 20 (17); Nathan Coulter-Nile 3/13 (3 overs)

Perth Scorchers won by 98 runs
Adelaide Oval
Attendance: 15,657
Umpires: Paul Wilson and Mick Martell
Player of the match: Shaun Marsh (Perth)

- Perth Scorchers won the toss and elected to bat
- Twenty20 debut: Travis Head (Adelaide Strikers)

12 January
19:00 (D/N)
Scorecard

(H) Hobart Hurricanes; 3/150 (20 overs)	v	Brisbane Heat; 2/152 (14.1 overs)
Jonathan Wells 40 (24); Daniel Christian 2/32 (4 overs)		Luke Pomersbach 82 (42); Ben Laughlin 1/35 (3 overs)

Brisbane Heat won by 8 wickets
Bellerive Oval, Hobart
Attendance: 12,098
Umpires: Gerard Abood & Sam Nogajski
Player of the match: Luke Pomersbach (Brisbane)

- Hobart Hurricanes won the toss and elected to bat
- Twenty20 debuts: Mark Higgs (Hobart Hurricanes) & Chris Sabburg (Brisbane Heat)

== Play-offs ==
Semi-finals
15 January — Docklands Stadium, Melbourne
1	Melbourne Renegades	168/9 (20 overs)
4	Brisbane Heat	183/3 (20 overs)
16 January — WACA Ground, Perth
2	Perth Scorchers	142/2 (13 overs)
3	Melbourne Stars	183/2 (18 overs)

Final
19 January — WACA Ground, Perth
SF1W	Brisbane Heat	167/5 (20 overs)
SF2W	Perth Scorchers	133/9 (20 overs)

=== Semi-final 1 ===
15 January 2013
19:00 (N)
Scorecard

Melbourne Renegades; 168/9 (20 overs)	v	Brisbane Heat; 183/3 (20 overs)
Ben Rohrer 42 (22); Muthiah Muralidaran 1/35 (4 overs)		Luke Pomersbach 112* (70); Ben Cutting 3/24 (4 overs)

Brisbane Heat won by 15 runs
Docklands Stadium, Melbourne
Umpires: John Ward and Paul Wilson
Player of the match: Luke Pomersbach (Brisbane Heat)

- Brisbane Heat won the toss and elected to bat.

=== Semi-final 2 ===
16 January 2013
17:00 (N)
Scorecard

Melbourne Stars; 183/2 (18 overs)	v	Perth Scorchers; 142/2 (13 overs)
Cameron White 88 (53); Nathan Coulter-Nile 1/24 (4 overs)		Shaun Marsh 68 (40); John Hastings 1/22 (3 overs)

Perth Scorchers won by 8 wickets
WACA Ground, Perth
Umpires: Mick Martell and Simon Fry
Player of the match: Shaun Marsh (Perth Scorchers)

- Perth Scorchers won the toss and elected to field.

=== Final ===
19 January 2013
17:00 (D/N)
Scorecard

Brisbane Heat; 167/5 (20 overs)	v	Perth Scorchers; 133/9 (20 overs)
Joe Burns 43 (27); Jason Behrendorff 2/38(4 overs)		Adam Voges 49 (32); Kemar Roach 3/18 (4 overs)

Brisbane Heat won by 34 runs
WACA Ground, Perth
Umpires: Mick Martell and Simon Fry
Player of the match: Nathan Hauritz (Brisbane Heat)

- Brisbane Heat won the toss and elected to bat.

== Statistics ==
Aaron Finch of Melbourne Renegades was named Player of the Tournament after scoring 332 runs, including an unbeaten century. Shaun Marsh of Perth Scorchers finished as the leading run-scorer with 412 runs in nine innings and Ben Laughlin of Hobart Hurricanes was the leading wicket-taker with 14 wickets in eight matches. The highest individual score of the tournament was 112 not out by Luke Pomersbach of Brisbane Heat in the semi-final game against Melbourne Renegades. Lasith Malinga took the best bowling figures of the tournament, taking six wickets for seven runs for Melbourne Stars against Perth Scorchers. This was the best bowling figures in Twenty20 cricket of Malinga's career and also the best bowling in a Twenty20 game on Australian soil. Xavier Doherty of Hobart Hurricanes took a hat-trick during the tournament.

Highest team totals
Team	Total	Opponent	Ground
Perth Scorchers	4/189 (20 overs)	Adelaide Strikers	Adelaide Oval
Perth Scorchers	3/187 (20 overs)	Melbourne Renegades	WACA Ground
Brisbane Heat	7/186 (20 overs)	Adelaide Strikers	Adelaide Oval
Adelaide Strikers	8/185 (20 overs)	Brisbane Heat	Adelaide Oval
Melbourne Stars	2/183 (18 overs)	Perth Scorchers	WACA Ground
Brisbane Heat	3/183 (20 overs)	Melbourne Renegades	Etihad Stadium

- Source: CricInfo

Most individual runs
Player	Team	Runs
Shaun Marsh	Perth Scorchers	412
Luke Pomersbach	Brisbane Heat	397
Brad Hodge	Melbourne Stars	342
Aaron Finch	Melbourne Renegades	332
Ben Rohrer	Melbourne Renegades	295

- Source: CricInfo

Highest individual score
Player	Team	Score	Opponent	Ground
Luke Pomersbach	Brisbane Heat	112*	Melbourne Renegades	Etihad Stadium
Aaron Finch	Melbourne Renegades	111*	Melbourne Stars	Etihad Stadium
Alex Hales	Melbourne Renegades	89	Sydney Sixers	Sydney Cricket Ground
Brad Hodge	Melbourne Stars	88	Adelaide Strikers	Adelaide Oval
Cameron White	Melbourne Stars	88	Perth Scorchers	WACA Ground

- Source: CricInfo

Most wickets
Player	Team	Wickets
Ben Laughlin	Hobart Hurricanes	14
Lasith Malinga	Melbourne Stars	13
Ben Cutting	Brisbane Heat	13
Alfonso Thomas	Perth Scorchers	12
Four players		11

- Source: CricInfo

Best bowling figures
Player	Team	Figures	Opponent	Ground
Lasith Malinga	Melbourne Stars	6/7	Perth Scorchers	WACA Ground
Daniel Christian	Brisbane Heat	5/26	Sydney Thunder	Stadium Australia
Alfonso Thomas	Perth Scorchers	4/8	Melbourne Renegades	WACA Ground
Dirk Nannes	Sydney Thunder	4/17	Adelaide Strikers	Stadium Australia
Brad Hogg	Perth Scorchers	4/29	Sydney Thunder	WACA Ground

- Source: CricInfo
