= Haberfield =

Haberfield may refer to:

- Graham Haberfield (1941–1975), actor
- Jake Haberfield (born 1986), cricketer
- Haberfield, New South Wales
