= Tom Thornton (cricketer) =

Australian cricketer (born 1989)

Personal information
- Born: 11 July 1989 (age 37); Canberra, Australia
- Source: Cricinfo, 28 September 2020

Tom Thornton (born 11 July 1989) is an Australian cricketer. He played in two first-class matches for South Australia in 2011.

== See also ==
- List of South Australian representative cricketers
