= Tom Stray =

South Australian cricketer (born 1987)

Thomas Dean Stray (born 18 January 1987 in Box Hill, Victoria) is a professional cricketer, representing the South Australia cricket team. He played in the 2006 Under-19 Cricket World Cup in Sri Lanka.
