= Tom Triffitt =

Australian cricketer (born 1990)

Personal information
- Full name: Thomas Ian Francis Triffitt
- Born: 13 November 1990 (age 35); Latrobe, Tasmania, Australia
- Height: 1.76 m (5 ft 9 in)
- Batting: Right-handed
- Role: Wicket-keeper

Domestic team information
- Years: Team
- 2011–2012: Tasmania
- 2011–2012: Hobart Hurricanes
- 2012–2013: Western Australia
- 2012–2013: Perth Scorchers
- 2014–2016: Melbourne Stars
- 2020–: Orford Oysters

Career statistics
Competition	FC	LA	T20
Matches	24	13	30
Runs scored	1036	154	202
Batting average	25.90	14.00	12.62
100s/50s	0/8	0/1	0/0
Top score	85	72*	25*
Catches/stumpings	94/2	16/1	22/1
- Source: CricketArchive, 29 January 2019

Thomas Ian Francis Triffitt (born 13 November 1990) is an Australian cricketer who has played for Tasmania, Western Australia, Hobart Hurricanes and the Perth Scorchers. Triffitt attended the Australian Cricket Academy, and went on to play for the Australian under-19 cricket team, serving as the team's wicket-keeper at the 2010 Under-19 World Cup. He made his debut at state level during the 2010–11 season, and played regularly over the following seasons as a replacement for Tim Paine.

== Domestic career ==
Triffitt was born in Latrobe, Tasmania, and grew up in Irishtown, in the north-west of the state. During his high school years, he boarded at the Launceston Church Grammar School. He played underage cricket for Tasmania at both under-17 and under-19 level, beginning at under-17 level at the age of 15. He subsequently received a scholarship to attend the Australian Cricket Academy at the Australian Institute of Sport. In July 2009 Triffitt was selected to play for the Australian under-19 cricket team during a tour by the Indian under-19 team, playing two under-19 Test matches. Playing as a wicket-keeper, he progressed to Tasmania's under-23 side in the Futures League in December 2009 and soon established himself as the side's first-choice wicket-keeper.

Considered one of the top junior wicket-keepers in the country, Triffitt was selected in Australia's squad for the 2010 ICC Under-19 Cricket World Cup, as the only Tasmanian member. He played every match in the tournament, and took 17 dismissals, the most of any player. He also scored 117 runs during the tournament, at an average of 29.25. Having originally been granted a rookie contract for the 2009–10 season by the Tasmanian Cricket Association, Triffitt was upgraded to a senior contract for the 2010–11 season, and made his debut for the state in the 2010–11 Ryobi One-Day Cup, against Victoria at Bellerive Oval in February 2011. Over the following two seasons, he was generally Tasmania's first-choice wicket-keeper, replacing Tim Paine who was either playing for Australia or injured. Triffitt was also named in the Hobart Hurricanes' squad for the inaugural season of the Big Bash League, replacing the injured Evan Gulbis in the squad, and filling the role of the injured Paine. He played every match in the tournament for Hobart, scoring 76 runs at an average of 15.20, and taking five catches.

In July 2012 Triffitt was signed to a two-year contract by the Western Australian Cricket Association (WACA), following the departure of Western Australia's first-choice wicket-keeper, Luke Ronchi, to New Zealand. He was also signed to the Perth Scorchers the same month. Triffitt debuted for Western Australia in the 2012–13 Ryobi One-Day Cup match against New South Wales, and registered a half century on his Sheffield Shield debut for Western Australia that month against the same opposition at the WACA. He played every match for the state in the 2012–13 season, in both the first-class and limited-overs competitions. In November 2012, he scored 85 runs against South Australia, his highest first-class score. He had also taken five catches in the game's first innings. At WACA grade cricket level, Triffitt plays for the Fremantle District Cricket Club. In Tasmania, he had played NTCA grade cricket for the Launceston Cricket Club.

In January 2014 Triffitt and teammate Tim Armstrong were involved in an incident whilst in Queensland with the Western Australian Futures League cricket team. Triffitt was arrested and charged with two counts of stealing and one count of wilful damage. Triffitt had his contract terminated and was suspended from selection to any WA representative team for the remainder of the season. The charges were later dropped and Triffitt admitted that he had a problem with alcohol, and had approached former footballer Heath Black to overcome the issue.

In January 2018 Triffitt was working in real estate in Hobart and had officially retired from professional cricket aged 27. In December 2025 it was reported that the Tasmanian Civil and Administrative Tribunal had found Triffitt guilty of professional misconduct, and enforced a five year ban backdated to 2021.
