= Liam Davis (cricketer) =

Australian cricketer

Personal information
- Full name: Liam Murray Davis
- Born: 2 August 1984 (age 42); Perth, Western Australia
- Nickname: Buff
- Height: 1.75 m (5 ft 9 in)
- Batting: Right-handed
- Bowling: Right-arm fast-medium
- Role: Batsman

Domestic team information
- Years: Team
- 2005/06–2012/13: Western Australia
- 2013/14: Perth Scorchers

Career statistics
Competition	FC	LA	T20
Matches	40	26	9
Runs scored	2,373	854	122
Batting average	31.22	34.16	15.25
100s/50s	4/8	2/2	0/1
Top score	303*	116*	53
Balls bowled	6	–	–
Wickets	1	–	–
Bowling average	6.00	–	–
5 wickets in innings	0	–	–
10 wickets in match	0	–	–
Best bowling	1/6	–	–
Catches/stumpings	31/–	3/–	1/–
- Source: CricketArchive, 30 May 2020

Liam Murray Davis (born 2 August 1984) is an Australian former professional cricketer who played for Western Australia in Australian domestic cricket. A former Australian under-19 representative, Davis made his debut for Western Australia in 2006. Generally playing as an opening batsman, he did not establish himself in the state team until late in the decade, having previously missed several matches due to injury. In February 2012, Davis scored a triple-century, 303 not out, against New South Wales, the second-highest score ever recorded for Western Australia at first-class level. He was also featured on the supplementary list of the Perth Scorchers for the 2012–13 season of the Big Bash League.

== Domestic career ==
Born in Perth, Western Australia, and educated at Churchlands Senior High School, Davis played under-17 and under-19 cricket for Western Australia, and also represented the Australian national under-19 team in five under-19 Tests and three under-19 One-Day Internationals. He scored a century on his under-19 Test debut in January 2003, 132 from 187 balls against England. Davis made his List A debut for Western Australia in January 2006, replacing Adam Voges who was suspended, and scored six runs batting third in the order, behind Justin Langer and Luke Ronchi. He played for Weybridge in the Surrey Premier League during the 2006 English cricket season as an overseas player.

Davis made his first-class debut for Western Australia against South Australia in November 2007, scoring eight and 42 runs in the first and second innings respectively. In his second match, against New South Wales, he scored 116 runs in the first innings, his maiden first-class century. He was seen by some as a replacement for the retiring Justin Langer. His form in the 2007–08 season led to him being offered a place at the Centre of Excellence. A rib injury during the 2009–10 season restricted Davis to four Sheffield Shield and three Ford Ranger Cup matches. He returned in the 2010–11 season to score two centuries in the first two matches of the Ryobi One-Day Cup, becoming the third Western Australia player, after Justin Langer and Luke Ronchi, to hit consecutive one-day centuries.

In October 2011, Davis was named in the Australian squad for the Hong Kong Sixes, but was later forced to withdraw due to state commitments. In November 2011, he signed with the Perth Scorchers in the Big Bash League for the 2011–12 season, however, he did not play any matches for the team due to injury. In a Sheffield Shield match against New South Wales in February 2012, Davis scored 303 not out, a triple-century and his highest score in any form of cricket. He shared in a partnership of 389 runs with Adam Voges, the third-highest partnership for Western Australia. After this innings, he became the leading runscorer in the competition for the 2011–12 season. Davis was selected to tour England with the Australia A team in July and August 2012. Having failed to gain a senior contract, he was included on the Perth Scorchers' supplementary list for the 2012–13 season.
