= Graeme Skennar =

Australian cricketer (born 1987)

Personal information
- Born: 24 March 1987 (age 39); Atherton, Queensland, Australia
- Source: Cricinfo, 9 October 2020

Graeme Skennar (born 24 March 1987) is an Australian cricketer. He played in three List A matches for Queensland in 2011.

== See also ==
- List of Queensland first-class cricketers
