= Steven Cazzulino =

Australian cricketer (born 1987)

Personal information
- Born: 1 February 1987 (age 39)
- Batting: Left-handed
- Role: Opening batsman

Domestic team information
- Years: Team
- 2010–2014: Tasmania
- Source: Cricinfo, 20 March 2016

Steven Cazzulino (born 1 February 1987) is an Australian cricketer. He played 13 first-class matches for Tasmania between 2010 and 2014.
