= Wade Townsend (cricketer) =

Australian cricketer (born 1986)

Wade James Townsend (born 29 January 1986) is an Australian professional cricketer who played for first-class team Queensland.

Townsend was born in the Brisbane suburb of Herston. Prior to becoming a professional cricketer he was a fish filleter.

Townsend opened in the Queensland vs Victoria 2010 Sheffield Shield Final, scoring 1 run in the first innings and 19 in the second innings.
