= Australian Cricket Academy =

Cricket training centre

The Australian Cricket Academy was founded in 1987 as a joint initiative of the Australian Institute of Sport (AIS) and the Australian Cricket Board (ACB). It was initially located at Henley Beach in Adelaide before moving to the Allan Border Field in Brisbane, Queensland in 2004 and renamed the "Commonwealth Bank Centre of Excellence".

It was designed to be a finishing school for leading young cricketers and is a program within the AIS. It was for some time known as the Commonwealth Bank Cricket Academy as part of a sponsorship arrangement with the Commonwealth Bank of Australia.

In 1997, to celebrate the Academy's tenth anniversary, a team of graduates called the Australian Cricket Academy XI (captained by Stuart Law) played an Australian XI. The match was tied.

The current manager is the retired captain of the Australian women's cricket team, Belinda Clark. At the end of the 2010–11 Ashes series, Troy Cooley became head coach.

== Notable graduates ==
=== Australia ===
- Michael Bevan (SA/NSW/TAS)
- Greg Blewett (SA)
- Nathan Bracken (NSW)
- Michael Clarke (NSW)
- Xavier Doherty (TAS)
- Callum Ferguson (SA)
- Adam Gilchrist (NSW/WA)
- Jason Gillespie (SA)
- Brad Haddin (NSW)
- Ben Hilfenhaus (TAS)
- Brad Hodge (VIC)
- David Hussey (WA)
- Michael Hussey (WA)
- Mitchell Johnson (QLD/WA)
- Brendon Julian (WA)
- Michael Kasprowicz (QLD)
- Simon Katich (WA/NSW)
- Jason Krejza (NSW)
- Justin Langer (WA)
- Brett Lee (NSW)
- Shane Lee (NSW)
- Stuart MacGill (NSW)
- Shaun Marsh (WA)
- Damien Martyn (WA)
- Glenn McGrath (NSW)
- Tim Paine (TAS)
- Ricky Ponting (TAS)
- Michael Slater (NSW)
- Andrew Symonds (QLD)
- Shaun Tait (SA)
- Shane Watson (QLD/NSW)
- Cameron White (VIC)
- Craig White (Vic & England)

=== Other ===
- Jason Gallian (England)
- Murray Goodwin (Zimbabwe)
- Douglas Marillier (Zimbabwe)
- Martin McCague (England)
- Suresh Raina (India)

=== Expellees ===
- David Warner (NSW) was expelled in 2007
- Aaron Finch (VIC) was expelled in 2007
- Shane Warne (VIC) was expelled in the early 1990s

== See also ==
- Cricket in Queensland
