= Will Sheridan (cricketer) =

Australian cricketer

Personal information
- Full name: William David Sheridan
- Born: 5 July 1987 (age 39); Chertsey, Surrey, England
- Height: 187 cm (6 ft 2 in)
- Batting: Right-handed
- Bowling: Left-arm fast-medium
- Role: All-rounder

Domestic team information
- Years: Team
- 2009/10–2013/14: Victoria
- 2011/12–2013/14: Melbourne Renegades (squad no. 31)

Career statistics
Competition	FC	LA	T20
Matches	12	16	13
Runs scored	294	136	67
Batting average	16.33	11.33	13.40
100s/50s	0/1	0/0	0/0
Top score	54	31	15*
Balls bowled	1,395	427	192
Wickets	28	10	11
Bowling average	32.14	39.70	24.54
5 wickets in innings	1	0	0
10 wickets in match	0	0	0
Best bowling	5/15	2/26	3/28
Catches/stumpings	6/–	3/–	7/–
- Source: ESPNcricinfo, 9 December 2024

William David Sheridan (born 5 July 1987) is an Australian cricketer who has played domestically for Victoria and the Melbourne Renegades.

Born in Chertsey, Surrey in the United Kingdom Sheridan emigrated to Australia at 3 months of age with his family, and was raised in Kiama, New South Wales. He played underage cricket for the Australian Capital Territory, as well as appearing for the Australian under-19 cricket team at the 2006 ICC Under-19 Cricket World Cup. Playing as a fast-bowling left-handed all-rounder, Sheridan appeared for the ACT in several matches in the Futures League, before moving to Melbourne and signing a rookie contract with Cricket Victoria for the 2009–10 Australian cricket season. He debuted for Victoria during the 2009–10 Sheffield Shield, playing his first first-class match against New South Wales at the Newcastle No. 1 Sports Ground, and scored a half-century, 54, on debut.

Over the following seasons, Sheridan regularly played for Victoria at both first-class and List A level. His first five-wicket haul, 5/15, was achieved in a Sheffield Shield match against Western Australia during the penultimate round of the 2011–12 competition. At grade cricket level, Sheridan plays for the Richmond Cricket Club. In the final of the 2011–12 Victorian Premier Cricket competition, he was awarded the John Scholes Medal as the best player on the ground, having taken three wickets and made 69. Sheridan now plays for the Yarraville Club Cricket Club and was named Man of the Match in the 2017/18 VTCA Grand Final scoring an unbeaten 112 in the club's 8th grand final victory in 10 seasons.
