= Matthew Gale =

Australian cricketer

Personal information
- Full name: Matthew Geoffrey Gale
- Born: 28 November 1983 (age 42); Box Hill, Victoria, Australia
- Nickname: Zephyr
- Height: 1.86 m (6 ft 1 in)
- Batting: Right-handed
- Bowling: Right-arm Fast-Medium
- Role: Bowler

Domestic team information
- Years: Team
- 2011–2014: Queensland
- 2012–2013: Brisbane Heat
- 2013–2014: Melbourne Renegades

Career statistics
| Competition | FC | LA | T20 |
|---|---|---|---|
| Matches | 7 | 7 | 6 |
| Runs scored | 51 | 50 | 5 |
| Batting average | 5.66 | 50.00 | 5.00 |
| 100s/50s | 0/0 | 0/0 | 0/0 |
| Top score | 18 | 22* | 4* |
| Balls bowled | 1,106 | 402 | 101 |
| Wickets | 22 | 13 | 5 |
| Bowling average | 31.04 | 29.61 | 27.00 |
| 5 wickets in innings | 1 | 1 | 0 |
| 10 wickets in match | 0 | 0 | 0 |
| Best bowling | 5/81 | 5/67 | 4/10 |
| Catches/stumpings | 2/– | 0/– | 1/– |
- Source: Cricinfo, 26 April 2014

Matthew Gale (born 28 November 1983) is an Australian cricketer. He plays for the Queensland Bulls and the Melbourne Renegades.

His career was curtailed by injury during the early part of the 2001/02 season. He eventually made his mark in Premier cricket with some outstanding performances.

As a result, he was offered a further extension to his VIS scholarship and was rewarded with selection in the Institute Challenge Series in Darwin.

However, injury and illness saw him in the wilderness for several seasons, earning a reputation as a dependable grade player with Ringwood, which he captained.

A financial planner, Gale is now based in Brisbane where he made his first class debut for Queensland against Western Australia at Perth in 2011, where he took 4 for 93 in the first innings and 2 for 40 in the second. His best bowling figures are 5 for 81. He later made his List A debut against Tasmania but, went wicket-less at over six runs an over.

In 2012, he was signed by the Brisbane Heat but, didn't play a game of the regular season. The Heat went on to win the tournament and Gale was part of the squad that went to the Champions League. He made his Twenty20 debut against the Titans, replacing an injured Kemar Roach and he took 4 for 10 in that match.

Gale continued to make regular appearances with the Bulls until he was signed by the Melbourne Renegades for the next Big Bash season. However, Gale could only take one wicket in four outings for the Renegades. He was not offered a contract by the Queensland Bulls for the 2014-15 season.

Gale is a nephew of former Australian test team bowling coach David Saker.
