= Chris Hartley =

Australian cricketer

Personal information
- Full name: Christopher Desmond Hartley
- Born: 24 May 1982 (age 44); Nambour, Queensland, Australia
- Nickname: Harts, Hannibal
- Height: 1.69 m (5 ft 7 in)
- Batting: Left-handed
- Role: Wicket-keeper

Domestic team information
- Years: Team
- 2003/04–2016/17: Queensland
- 2011/12–2013/14: Brisbane Heat
- 2014/15–2015/16: Sydney Thunder
- FC debut: 19 December 2003 Queensland v South Australia
- Last FC: 16 March 2017 Queensland v Victoria
- LA debut: 29 February 2004 Queensland v Western Australia
- Last LA: 21 October 2015 Queensland v Western Australia

Career statistics
| Competition | FC | LA | T20 |
|---|---|---|---|
| Matches | 131 | 96 | 55 |
| Runs scored | 6,138 | 2,077 | 312 |
| Batting average | 34.48 | 31.46 | 17.33 |
| 100s/50s | 10/33 | 1/13 | 0/0 |
| Top score | 142* | 142 | 35 |
| Catches/stumpings | 547/17 | 115/14 | 34/8 |
- Source: ESPNcricinfo, 2 April 2017

Christopher Desmond Hartley (born 24 May 1982) is an Australian cricketer who played for Queensland in Australian domestic cricket between 2002 and 2016. He was the team's first-choice wicket-keeper and won two Sheffield Shield titles with the team.

Hartley was born at Nambour, Queensland and educated at Brisbane Boys' College where he was College Captain in 1999.

He played as a hard-hitting left-handed batsman and became the first from his state since Matthew Hayden to score a debut century, making 103 against South Australia in 2003–04. On 21 September 2005, he took part in Australia A's tour of Pakistan. He was part of Queensland's Pura Cup winning side for 2005–06 and took seven catches in the final to finish with a tally for the season of 53 dismissals.

Hartley was announced Sheffield Shield player of the 2009–10 season on 15 March 2010 in the week preceding the Shield Final.

In the 2014–15 Big Bash League season, Hartley represented Sydney Thunder.

In 2016, he took his 500th Sheffield Shield catch, the first wicket-keeper to do so. In February 2017 he equalled Darren Berry's record for the most dismissals by a wicket-keeper in the Sheffield Shield, when he took his 546th dismissal. Later that month, he played in his 100th consecutive Sheffield Shield match. However, shortly after that he broke a finger, meaning he missed his first Sheffield Shield match since October 2007.

In March 2017, he announced his retirement from domestic cricket, following the conclusion of the 2016–17 Sheffield Shield season.
