= Jayde Herrick =

Australian cricketer (born 1985)

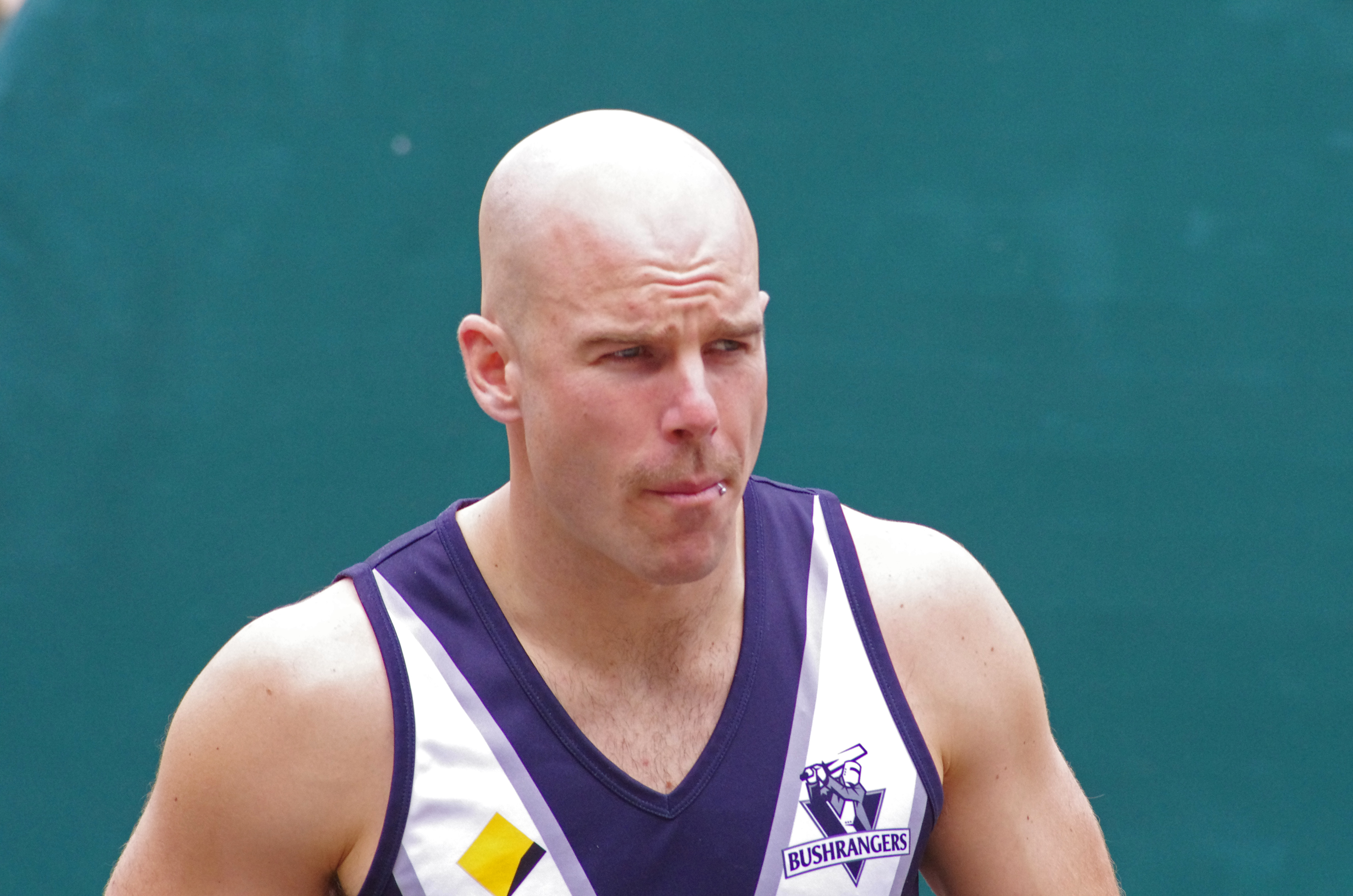

Personal information
- Full name: Jayde Matthew Herrick
- Born: 16 January 1985 (age 41); Melbourne, Australia
- Batting: Right-handed
- Bowling: Right-arm fast-medium
- Role: Bowler

Domestic team information
- Years: Team
- 2010/11: Wellington
- 2010/11–2012/13: Victoria (squad no. 28)
- 2011/12–2013/14: Melbourne Renegades (squad no. 28)
- FC debut: 23 November 2010 Wellington v Otago
- Last FC: 14 March 2013 Victoria v Tasmania
- LA debut: 30 October 2011 Victoria v New South Wales
- Last LA: 13 February 2013 Victoria v England Lions

Career statistics
Competition	FC	LA	T20
Matches	19	10	2
Runs scored	391	25	0
Batting average	19.55	25.00	0.00
100s/50s	0/1	0/0	0/0
Top score	62*	13*	0
Balls bowled	3,865	484	45
Wickets	77	16	0
Bowling average	31.55	29.31	–
5 wickets in innings	1	1	–
10 wickets in match	0	0	–
Best bowling	5/79	5/51	–
Catches/stumpings	0/0	3/–	1/–
- Source: CricketArchive, 23 December 2014

Jayde Matthew Herrick (born 16 January 1985) is a former Australian cricketer who played for Victoria. He is a right-arm fast-medium bowler and a right-hand batsman.

== Career ==
In November 2010, Herrick made his First-class cricket debut for Wellington in a New Zealand domestic match and then the following month played for Victoria in a match against England. He impressed, making 40 runs from just 19 balls in the second innings and by taking the wickets of Eoin Morgan and Paul Collingwood.

Herrick made a remarkable Sheffield Shield debut for Victoria in March 2011. Playing against South Australia, he claimed match bowling figures of 6/115 from 36 overs. Batting at number 11, he was also part of a crucial 85-run partnership with Steve Gilmour. In that partnership, Herrick contributed 43 from 55 balls.

He signed with the Melbourne Renegades in the newly formed Big Bash League for the 2011–12 season.

In the 2012/13 Sheffield Shield season, Herrick took multiple wickets against Western Australia, New South Wales and Tasmania. His last recorded first-class matches were in late 2013, including for Victoria Under-23s and a Cricket Australia Chairman's XI game."

Herrick's most consistent season was 2012/13, with key wickets in the Sheffield Shield. He retired from professional cricket thereafter.
