= Jake Haberfield =

Australian cricketer (born 1986)

Personal information
- Full name: Jake Andy Haberfield
- Born: 18 June 1986 (age 40); Townsville, Queensland
- Nickname: Habers
- Height: 1.9 m (6 ft 3 in)
- Batting: Right-handed
- Bowling: Right-arm fast
- Role: Bowler

Domestic team information
- Years: Team
- 2008/09–2012/13: South Australia
- 2013/14: Victoria

Career statistics
Competition	FC	LA	T20
Matches	18	31	3
Runs scored	91	26	–
Batting average	6.50	5.20	–
100s/50s	0/0	0/0	–
Top score	26*	5*	–
Balls bowled	2,951	1,415	60
Wickets	45	54	2
Bowling average	42.93	21.40	44.50
5 wickets in innings	0	0	0
10 wickets in match	0	0	0
Best bowling	4/60	4/30	1/27
Catches/stumpings	4/–	13/–	0/–
- Source: CricketArchive, 12 May 2022

Jake Andy Haberfield (born 18 June 1986) is a professional cricketer who played for the Victorian Bushrangers. On 2 December 2013, Haberfield was signed by the Melbourne Renegades Big Bash League franchise as their final signing for the second season, but did not play a match for the side.
