= Gary Putland =

Australian cricketer (born 1986)

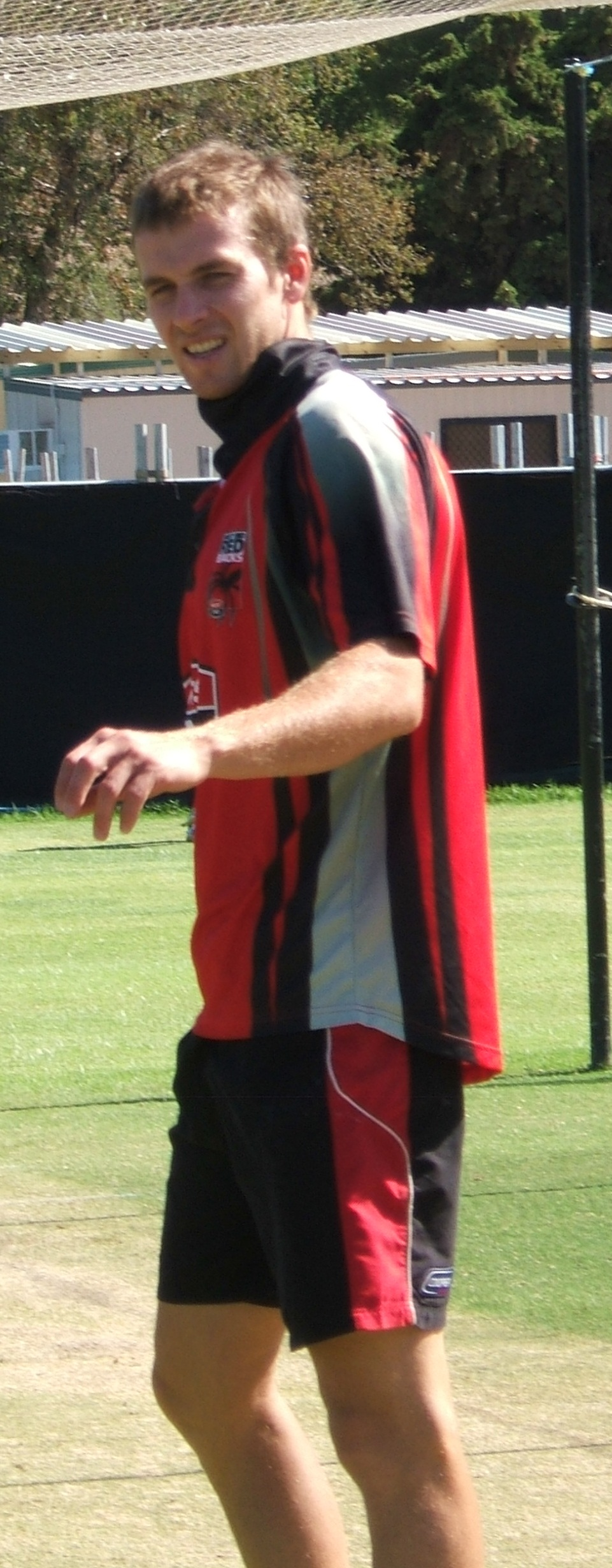

Personal information
- Full name: Gary David Putland
- Born: 10 February 1986 (age 40)
- Batting: Right-handed
- Bowling: Left-arm fast-medium
- Role: Bowler

Domestic team information
- Years: Team
- 2005/06–2015/16: South Australia
- 2011/12–2015/16: Adelaide Strikers

Career statistics
Competition	FC	LA	T20
Matches	26	35	23
Runs scored	189	53	16
Batting average	6.09	5.30	5.33
100s/50s	0/0	0/0	0/0
Top score	31*	9	4*
Balls bowled	5,284	1,836	419
Wickets	92	54	16
Bowling average	30.30	29.38	37.25
5 wickets in innings	6	0	0
10 wickets in match	1	0	0
Best bowling	7/64	4/41	3/31
Catches/stumpings	9/–	8/–	10/–
- Source: ESPNcricinfo, 12 February 2022

Gary Putland (born 10 February 1986) is an Australian professional cricketer. He is a left-arm fast-medium bowler who has played for the Southern Redbacks, the representative team of the South Australian Cricket Association.

Putland represented Australia at youth level and was trained at the Australian Cricket Academy. He played grade cricket for Southern Districts. He started playing limited overs and Twenty20 matches for South Australia in the 2005–06 season, but it took him until February 2010 to make his first-class debut for the state, in a Sheffield Shield match against Western Australia. He entered the players auction to join the Indian Premier League in 2011, but was unsold.
