= Damien Mealey =

Australian cricketer and umpire (born 1968)

Personal information
- Full name: Damien Barry Mealey
- Born: 20 April 1968 (age 58); Brisbane, Australia
- Role: umpire

Umpiring information
- WODIs umpired: 2 (2011–2016)
- WT20Is umpired: 5 (2009–2014)
- Source: ESPNcricinfo, 17 July 2016

Damien Mealey (born 20 April 1968) is an Australian cricketer and umpire.

He was the umpire for the Matador BBQs One-Day Cup match played between the CA XI and South Australia.
