= Jason Krejza =

Australian cricketer

Personal information
- Full name: Jason John Krejza
- Born: 14 January 1983 (age 43); Newtown, New South Wales, Australia
- Nickname: Krazy, Subway
- Height: 1.84 m (6 ft 0 in)
- Batting: Right-handed
- Bowling: Right-arm off-break
- Role: All-rounder

International information
- National side: Australia (2008–2011)
- Test debut (cap 404): 6 November 2008 v India
- Last Test: 21 December 2008 v South Africa
- ODI debut (cap 187): 6 February 2011 v England
- Last ODI: 24 March 2011 v India

Domestic team information
- Years: Team
- 2004/05–2006/07: New South Wales
- 2005: Leicestershire
- 2006/07–2012/13: Tasmania
- 2011/12–2012/13: Hobart Hurricanes

Career statistics
Competition	Test	ODI	FC	LA
Matches	2	8	54	58
Runs scored	71	13	1,587	615
Batting average	23.66	13.00	25.19	18.63
100s/50s	0/0	0/0	2/7	0/1
Top score	32	7	118*	52*
Balls bowled	743	425	8,959	2,796
Wickets	13	7	114	61
Bowling average	43.23	47.28	49.59	38.06
5 wickets in innings	1	0	1	1
10 wickets in match	1	0	1	0
Best bowling	8/215	2/28	8/215	6/55
Catches/stumpings	4/–	2/–	31/–	25/–
- Source: CricketArchive, 18 July 2020

Jason John Krejza (born 14 January 1983) is a former Australian cricketer. He played for the Tasmanian Tigers and Leicestershire. Krejza's father was an association football player from Czechoslovakia and his mother was born in Poland. His nickname is "Krazy".

== 2004–2008: Early domestic career ==
Krejza is an all-rounder, contributing to the team mainly as a right arm off-break bowler, but also as a right-handed lower-middle order batsman. He became a regular in the NSW team in 2004/05 but lost his place in 2006/07. However solid form for Sydney Grade team UTS-Balmain led to his inclusion in the NSW limited overs team towards the end of 2006. On 21 December 2006 Krejza announced that he would leave the New South Wales Blues to join the Tasmanian Tigers due to being considered 4th choice behind spinners Stuart MacGill, Nathan Hauritz and Beau Casson in the selection process.

After crossing over mid-season to Tasmania [2006–7 season], Krejza played in 2 Pura Cup games, claiming 5 wickets and scoring a disappointing 17 runs in two innings. In the Ford Ranger Cup competition, however, he made his mark, taking 8 wickets in 4 games whilst also scoring 83 runs, with a top score of 53 not out.

During the off-season, his cricketing career was placed at risk after being caught speeding and drink-driving by Hobart police. He was subsequently suspended from Tasmania's pre-season training and warned to stay away from alcohol by his team's leadership group.

His renewed dedication to cricket saw him excel in the 2007–8 season. In the Pura Cup, he played 7 games and scored 289 runs at an average of 36.12, with a high score of 63. He also took 18 wickets at 47.11. The only downside to his season was that he did not break into the one-day side, with incumbent Xavier Doherty being Tasmania's sole spin bowler in the one-day arena. He played only one game, and was named 12th man in Tasmania's competition victory against Victoria.

== International career ==
=== 2008–09: Test berth in India ===
After being named to Australia's A Team tour to India in August, he was selected for Australia's Test tour of India. With his selection, Australian chairman of selectors Andrew Hilditch said, "Jason Krejza had a good season for Tasmania last year but is a selection very much for Indian conditions. The selectors felt right-arm finger spinners would perform well in India and Jason now has a chance to prove himself at the international level."

Krejza was seen as the second spinner in the squad behind Bryce McGain. However, McGain was sent home injured. Krejza was attacked by the Indian Board President's XI—a team consisting mainly of young emerging players or fringe Indian representatives—in a tour match, conceding 0/199 in 31 overs, and he was then excluded from the first three Tests at the expense of McGain's replacement, Cameron White. This was despite captain Ricky Ponting frequently hinting that Krejza would play and predicting that India's senior batsmen would not have the gumption to attack him.

Krejza eventually made his debut in the fourth test in Nagpur, which Australia had to win in order to draw the series and retain the Border–Gavaskar Trophy. He came in at the expense of fast bowler Stuart Clark and played alongside White. Rahul Dravid became his first wicket. He went on to claim 8 wickets for 215 runs in the first innings. In the process, he became just the fourteenth Australian to take five or more wickets in an innings on debut, and also created the unenviable world-record of conceding the most runs for any bowler on debut, while also taking most wickets in his first Test match innings. It also beat his best first-class bowling of 4 for 91. In the second innings he took a further 4 wickets for 143 runs, leaving him with figures of 12 wickets for 358 runs in his first test. He is the second on the list of Test bowlers who have conceded most runs in a single Test match, beaten only by Tommy Scott's match return of 9 for 374, for the West Indies against England in Kingston, Jamaica, in 1929/1930. He was named man of the match despite Australia's defeat.

Krejza was then dropped for the First Test against New Zealand in Brisbane on grounds that the pitch would benefit seamers as Australia fielded no spinners. He was to be recalled for the Second Test in Adelaide, but he injured his ankle and was replaced by fellow offspinner Nathan Hauritz. Australia won both Tests. Krejza played his first Test in Australia against South Africa in Perth. He took 1/103 and 0/106 and was dropped from the squad for the Second Test in favour of Hauritz after the tourists reached their target of 414 with six wickets in hand.

=== 2011: International Re-Call ===
After spending a couple of seasons in international wilderness, Krejza was surprisingly called up to the Australian One-Day side for the 7th ODI against England. His opportunity arose due to injuries to first-choice spinners Nathan Hauritz and Steve Smith, and preferred back-up option Xavier Doherty. He made his ODI debut in Perth and finished with bowling figures of 2/53 from 9 overs as well as making 6 not out with the bat in a match the Australians won by 57 runs to take the series 6–1. Krejza was also named in the Australian squad for the 2011 Cricket World Cup on the subcontinent, with both Hauritz and Doherty unable to make the trip due to their respective injuries.
