= Gerard Abood =

Australian cricket umpire (born 1972)

Personal information
- Full name: Gerard Anthony Abood
- Born: 28 February 1972 (age 54); Sydney, Australia
- Role: Umpire

Umpiring information
- ODIs umpired: 2 (2018–2020)
- T20Is umpired: 8 (2018–2020)
- WTests umpired: 1 (2017)
- WODIs umpired: 9 (2008–2014)
- WT20Is umpired: 11 (2008–2017)
- Source: ESPNcricinfo, 8 December 2020

Gerard Abood (born 28 February 1972) is an Australian cricket umpire. He has officiated in matches in the Big Bash League tournament as well as women's One Day International (ODI) matches in the 2014–16 ICC Women's Championship.

In November 2017, along with Geoff Joshua, he was one of the on-field umpires for the Women's Ashes Test match between Australia and England. He stood in his first Twenty20 International (T20I) match, between Australia and England, on 7 February 2018. He officiated in his first ODI, a match between Australia and South Africa, on 9 November 2018. As of December 2020, he had officiated in 2 ODIs and 8 T20Is.

== See also ==
- List of One Day International cricket umpires
- List of Twenty20 International cricket umpires
