= 2015–16 Big Bash League season squads =

The 2015–16 Big Bash League season was the fifth season of the Big Bash League, the top-level Twenty20 cricket competition in Australia. Each team signed a minimum of 18 players, including two rookie contracts and two visa contacted players.

== Adelaide Strikers ==
- Ages given as of 17 December 2015, the date of the first match of the season

No.	Name	National side	Date of birth (age)	Batting style	Bowling style	Notes
Batsmen
17	Brad Hodge	Australia	29 December 1974 (aged 40)	Right-handed	Right arm off spin	Captain
50	Craig Simmons	Australia	1 December 1982 (aged 33)	Left-handed	Left arm orthodox	
77	Jono Dean	Australia	23 June 1984 (aged 31)	Right-handed	Right arm off spin	
34	Travis Head	Australia	29 December 1993 (aged 21)	Left-handed	Right arm off spin	
49	Alex Ross	Australia	17 April 1992 (aged 23)	Right-handed	Right arm off spin	
19	Kelvin Smith	Australia	5 September 1994 (aged 21)	Left-handed	Right arm off spin	
–	Patrick Page	Australia	15 January 1998 (aged 17)	Left-handed	Right arm medium fast	Development rookie contract
33	Jake Lehmann	Australia	8 July 1992 (aged 23)	Left-handed	Left arm orthodox	
27	Mahela Jayawardene	Sri Lanka	27 May 1977 (aged 38)	Right-handed	Right arm medium	Visa contract, injury replacement player for Kieron Pollard
All-rounders
55	Kieron Pollard	West Indies	12 May 1987 (aged 28)	Right-handed	Right arm medium fast	Visa contract
20	Michael Neser	Australia	29 March 1990 (aged 25)	Right-handed	Right arm medium fast	
29	Hamish Kingston	Australia	17 December 1990 (aged 25)	Right-handed	Right arm medium fast	
42	Alexander Keath	Australia	20 January 1992 (aged 23)	Right-handed	Right arm medium	
Wicketkeepers
15	Tim Ludeman	Australia	23 June 1987 (aged 28)	Right-handed	–	
Pace bowlers
23	Kane Richardson	Australia	12 February 1991 (aged 24)	Right-handed	Right arm fast medium	
56	Ben Laughlin	Australia	3 October 1982 (aged 33)	Right-handed	Right arm fast medium	
10	Gary Putland	Australia	10 February 1986 (aged 29)	Right-handed	Left arm fast medium	
3	Billy Stanlake	Australia	11 April 1994 (aged 21)	Right-handed	Right arm fast medium	
Spin bowlers
25	Jon Holland	Australia	29 May 1987 (aged 28)	Right-handed	Left arm off spin	
95	Adil Rashid	England	17 February 1988 (aged 27)	Right-handed	Right arm leg spin	Visa contract

== Brisbane Heat ==
- Ages given as of 17 December 2015, the date of the first match of the season

No.	Name	National side	Date of birth (age)	Batting style	Bowling style	Notes
Batsmen
62	Joe Burns	Australia	6 September 1989 (aged 26)	Right-handed	Right arm medium	
54	Lendl Simmons	West Indies	25 January 1985 (aged 30)	Right-handed	Right arm medium	Visa contract, replacement player for Brendon McCullum
14	Alex Doolan	Australia	29 November 1985 (aged 30)	Right-handed	Right arm medium	
00	Peter Forrest	Australia	15 November 1985 (aged 30)	Right-handed	Right arm medium	
50	Chris Lynn	Australia	10 April 1990 (aged 25)	Right-handed	Left arm orthodox	Captain
36	Nathan Reardon	Australia	8 November 1984 (aged 31)	Left-handed	Right arm medium	
All-rounders
52	Jason Floros	Australia	24 December 1990 (aged 24)	Left-handed	Right arm off spin	
39	James Hopes	Australia	24 November 1978 (aged 37)	Right-handed	Right arm fast medium	
24	Jack Wildermuth	Australia	1 September 1993 (aged 22)	Right-handed	Right arm medium fast	
Wicketkeepers
42	Brendon McCullum	New Zealand	27 September 1981 (aged 34)	Right-handed	Right arm medium	Visa contract
59	James Peirson	Australia	13 October 1992 (aged 23)	Right-handed	–	
Pace bowlers
16	Nick Buchanan	Australia	4 March 1991 (aged 24)	Right-handed	Right arm fast medium	
12	Andrew Fekete	Australia	18 May 1985 (aged 30)	Right-handed	Right arm fast medium	
58	Luke Feldman	Australia	1 August 1984 (aged 31)	Right-handed	Right arm fast medium	
2	Josh Lalor	Australia	4 November 1987 (aged 28)	Right-handed	Left arm fast medium	
31	Ben Cutting	Australia	30 January 1987 (aged 28)	Right-handed	Right arm fast medium	
6	Mark Steketee	Australia	17 January 1994 (aged 21)	Right-handed	Right arm fast medium	
Spin bowlers
77	Samuel Badree	West Indies	8 March 1981 (aged 34)	Right-handed	Right arm leg spin	Visa contract
4	Mitchell Swepson	Australia	4 October 1993 (aged 22)	Right-handed	Right arm leg spin	

== Hobart Hurricanes ==
- Ages given as of 17 December 2015, the date of the first match of the season

No.	Name	National side	Date of birth (age)	Batting style	Bowling style	Notes
Batsmen
10	George Bailey	Australia	7 September 1982 (aged 33)	Right-handed	Right arm medium	
11	Kumar Sangakkara	Sri Lanka	27 October 1977 (aged 38)	Left-handed	Right arm medium	Visa contract
9	Jonathan Wells	Australia	13 August 1988 (aged 27)	Right-handed	Right arm medium	
20	Beau Webster	Australia	1 December 1993 (aged 22)	Right-handed	Right-arm off-break	
33	Michael Hill	Australia	29 September 1988 (aged 27)	Left-handed	Right-arm medium	
46	Dominic Michael	Australia	8 October 1987 (aged 28)	Left-handed	Right-arm medium	
All-rounders
88	Darren Sammy	West Indies	20 December 1983 (aged 31)	Right-handed	Right arm fast medium	Visa contract
54	Daniel Christian	Australia	4 May 1983 (aged 32)	Right-handed	Right arm fast medium	
15	Simon Milenko	Australia	24 November 1988 (aged 27)	Right-handed	Right arm fast medium	
Wicketkeepers
27	Tim Paine	Australia	8 December 1984 (aged 31)	Right-handed	Right arm medium	Captain
51	Ben Dunk	Australia	11 March 1987 (aged 28)	Left-handed	–	
Pace bowlers
32	Shaun Tait	Australia	22 February 1983 (aged 32)	Right-handed	Right arm fast	
25	Timm van der Gugten	Netherlands	25 February 1991 (aged 24)	Right-handed	Right arm fast medium	Non-visa Dutch international
44	Jake Reed	Australia	28 September 1990 (aged 25)	Right-handed	Right arm fast medium	
43	Sam Rainbird	Australia	5 June 1992 (aged 23)	Right-handed	Left arm fast medium	
15	Joe Mennie	Australia	24 December 1988 (aged 26)	Right-handed	Right arm fast medium	
Spin bowlers
13	Cameron Boyce	Australia	27 July 1989 (aged 26)	Right-handed	Right arm leg spin	
31	Clive Rose	Australia	13 October 1989 (aged 26)	Right-handed	Left arm orthodox	

== Melbourne Renegades ==
- Ages given as of 17 December 2015, the date of the first match of the season

No.	Name	National side	Date of birth (age)	Batting style	Bowling style	Notes
Batsmen
5	Aaron Finch	Australia	17 November 1986 (aged 29)	Right-handed	Left arm orthodox	Captain
6	Tom Beaton	Australia	28 November 1990 (aged 25)	Right-handed	Right arm medium	
26	Tom Cooper	Netherlands	26 November 1986 (aged 29)	Right-handed	Right arm off spin	Non-visa Dutch international
12	Callum Ferguson	Australia	21 November 1984 (aged 31)	Right-handed	Right arm medium	
9	Matt Short	Australia	8 November 1995 (aged 20)	Right-handed	Right arm off spin	
7	Cameron White	Australia	18 August 1983 (aged 32)	Right-handed	Right arm leg break	
–	Ben McDermott	Australia	12 December 1994 (aged 21)	Right-handed	Right arm medium	Injury replacement player for Callum Ferguson
All-rounders
47	Dwayne Bravo	West Indies	7 October 1983 (aged 32)	Right-handed	Right arm fast medium	Visa contract
333	Chris Gayle	West Indies	21 September 1979 (aged 36)	Left-handed	Right arm off spin	Visa contract
3	Cameron Stevenson	Australia		Right-handed	Right arm fast medium	Supplementary listed player
Wicketkeepers
20	Peter Nevill	Australia	13 October 1985 (aged 30)	Right-handed	–	
13	Matthew Wade	Australia	26 December 1987 (aged 27)	Left-handed	Right arm medium	
Pace bowlers
19	James Pattinson	Australia	3 May 1990 (aged 25)	Left-handed	Right arm fast	
35	Nathan Rimmington	Australia	11 November 1982 (aged 33)	Right-handed	Right arm fast medium	
10	Peter Siddle	Australia	25 November 1984 (aged 31)	Right-handed	Right arm fast medium	
14	Chris Tremain	Australia	10 August 1991 (aged 24)	Right-handed	Right arm fast medium	
4	Guy Walker	Australia	12 September 1995 (aged 20)	Right-handed	Right arm fast medium	
44	Nick Winter	Australia	19 June 1993 (aged 22)	Left-handed	Left arm fast medium	
21	Cameron Gannon	Australia	23 January 1989 (aged 26)	Right-handed	Right arm fast medium	Injury replacement player for Nick Winter
–	Tom O'Donnell	Australia	23 October 1996 (aged 19)	Right-handed	Left arm medium	Development rookie contract
Spin bowlers
24	Xavier Doherty	Australia	22 November 1982 (aged 33)	Left-handed	Left-arm orthodox	
43	Nathan Hauritz	Australia	18 October 1981 (aged 34)	Right-handed	Right arm off spin	
–	Gehan Seneviratne	Australia				Community rookie contract

== Melbourne Stars ==
- Ages given as of 17 December 2015, the date of the first match of the season

No.	Name	National side	Date of birth (age)	Batting style	Bowling style	Notes
Batsmen
24	Kevin Pietersen	England	27 June 1980 (aged 35)	Right-handed	Right arm off spin	Visa contract
8	David Hussey	Australia	15 July 1977 (aged 38)	Right-handed	Right arm off spin	Captain
21	Robert Quiney	Australia	20 August 1982 (aged 33)	Left-handed	Right arm medium	
All-rounders
6	Luke Wright	England	7 March 1985 (aged 30)	Right-handed	Right arm fast medium	Visa contract
5	James Faulkner	Australia	29 April 1990 (aged 25)	Right-handed	Left arm fast medium	Vice-captain
32	Glenn Maxwell	Australia	14 October 1988 (aged 27)	Right-handed	Right arm off spin	
11	John Hastings	Australia	4 November 1985 (aged 30)	Right-handed	Right arm fast medium	
16	Marcus Stoinis	Australia	16 August 1989 (aged 26)	Right-handed	Right arm medium	
4	Evan Gulbis	Australia	26 March 1986 (aged 29)	Right-handed	Right arm fast medium	
Wicketkeepers
54	Peter Handscomb	Australia	26 April 1991 (aged 24)	Right-handed	–	
7	Tom Triffitt	Australia	13 November 1990 (aged 25)	Right-handed	–	
2	Sam Harper	Australia	10 December 1996 (aged 19)	Right-handed	–	
Pace bowlers
17	Daniel Worrall	Australia	10 July 1991 (aged 24)	Right-handed	Right arm fast medium	
25	Scott Boland	Australia	11 April 1989 (aged 26)	Right-handed	Right arm fast medium	
20	Ben Hilfenhaus	Australia	15 March 1983 (aged 32)	Right-handed	Right arm fast medium	
Spin bowlers
19	Michael Beer	Australia	9 June 1984 (aged 31)	Right-handed	Left arm orthodox	
63	Adam Zampa	Australia	31 March 1992 (aged 23)	Right-handed	Right-arm leg break	

== Perth Scorchers ==
- Ages given as of 17 December 2015, the date of the first match of the season

No.	Name	National side	Date of birth (age)	Batting style	Bowling style	Notes
Batsmen
32	Adam Voges	Australia	4 October 1979 (aged 36)	Right-handed	Left arm orthodox	Captain
6	Cameron Bancroft	Australia	19 November 1992 (aged 23)	Right-handed	–	
20	Shaun Marsh	Australia	9 July 1983 (aged 32)	Left-handed	Left arm orthodox	
7	Michael Klinger	Australia	4 July 1980 (aged 35)	Right-handed	–	
15	Michael Carberry	England	29 September 1980 (aged 35)	Left-handed	Right-arm offbreak	Visa contract
14	Marcus Harris	Australia	21 July 1992 (aged 23)	Left-handed	Right-arm offbreak	
All-rounders
13	Nathan Coulter-Nile	Australia	11 October 1987 (aged 28)	Right-handed	Right-arm fast	
31	Brad Hogg	Australia	6 February 1971 (aged 44)	Left-handed	Slow left-arm wrist-spin	
10	Mitchell Marsh	Australia	20 October 1990 (aged 25)	Right-handed	Right-arm fast medium	
17	Ashton Turner	Australia	25 January 1993 (aged 22)	Right-handed	Right-arm offbreak	
Wicket-keepers
9	Sam Whiteman	Australia	19 March 1992 (aged 23)	Left-handed	–	
Pace bowlers
5	Jason Behrendorff	Australia	20 April 1990 (aged 25)	Right-handed	Left-arm fast medium	
33	Simon Mackin	Australia	1 September 1992 (aged 23)	Right-handed	Right-arm fast medium	
68	Andrew Tye	Australia	12 December 1986 (aged 29)	Right-handed	Right-arm medium fast	
3	Joel Paris	Australia	11 December 1992 (aged 23)	Left-handed	Left-arm fast medium	
8	David Willey	England	28 February 1990 (aged 25)	Left-handed	Left-arm fast medium	Visa contract
Spin bowlers
18	Ashton Agar	Australia	14 October 1993 (aged 22)	Left-handed	Left arm orthodox	
67	James Muirhead	Australia	30 July 1993 (aged 22)	Right-handed	Right-arm leg spin	

== Sydney Sixers ==
- Ages given as of 17 December 2015, the date of the first match of the season

No.	Name	National side	Date of birth (age)	Batting style	Bowling style	Notes
Batsmen
41	Michael Lumb	England	12 February 1980 (aged 35)	Left-handed	Right arm medium	Visa contract
27	Ed Cowan	Australia	16 June 1982 (aged 33)	Left-handed	Right arm leg spin	
49	Steve Smith	Australia	2 June 1989 (aged 26)	Right-handed	Right arm leg spin	
53	Nic Maddinson	Australia	21 December 1991 (aged 23)	Left-handed	Left arm orthodox	
14	Jordan Silk	Australia	13 April 1992 (aged 23)	Right-handed	–	
36	Nick Larkin	Australia	1 May 1990 (aged 25)	Right-handed	–	Injury replacement player
All-rounders
21	Moises Henriques	Australia	1 February 1987 (aged 28)	Right-handed	Right arm fast medium	Captain
22	Johan Botha	South Africa	2 May 1982 (aged 33)	Right-handed	Right arm off spin	Visa contract
72	Stephen O'Keefe	Australia	9 December 1984 (aged 31)	Right-handed	Left arm orthodox	
77	Sean Abbott	Australia	29 February 1992 (aged 23)	Right-handed	Right arm fast medium	
23	Ben Dwarshuis	Australia	23 June 1994 (aged 21)	Left-handed	Left arm fast medium	
37	Trent Lawford	Australia	18 April 1988 (aged 27)	Right-handed	Right arm fast medium	
Wicket-keepers
24	Brad Haddin	Australia	23 October 1977 (aged 38)	Right-handed	–	
1	Ryan Carters	Australia	25 July 1990 (aged 25)	Right-handed	–	
Pace bowlers
56	Mitchell Starc	Australia	30 January 1990 (aged 25)	Left-handed	Left-arm fast	
8	Josh Hazlewood	Australia	8 January 1991 (aged 24)	Left-handed	Right arm fast medium	
4	Doug Bollinger	Australia	24 July 1981 (aged 34)	Left-handed	Left arm fast medium	
33	Jackson Bird	Australia	11 December 1986 (aged 29)	Right-handed	Right arm fast medium	
79	Mickey Edwards	Australia	unknown	Right-handed	Right arm fast medium	
Spin bowlers
67	Nathan Lyon	Australia	20 November 1987 (aged 28)	Right-handed	Right arm off spin	
5	Riley Ayre	Australia	2 April 1996 (aged 19)	Right-handed	Right arm off spin	Replacement player for Nathan Lyon
–	Soumil Chhibber	Australia	16 June 1995 (aged 20)	Right-handed	Right arm off spin	Development rookie contract
88	Li Kai Ming	Hong Kong	5 July 1991 (aged 24)	Right-handed	Right arm leg spin	Community rookie contract

== Sydney Thunder ==
- Ages given as of 17 December 2015, the date of the first match of the season

No.	Name	National side	Date of birth (age)	Batting style	Bowling style	Notes
Batsmen
48	Michael Hussey	Australia	27 May 1975 (aged 40)	Left-handed	Right arm medium	Captain
18	Usman Khawaja	Australia	18 December 1986 (aged 28)	Left-handed	Right arm medium	
6	Aiden Blizzard	Australia	27 June 1984 (aged 31)	Left-handed	Left arm medium	
17	Kurtis Patterson	Australia	5 April 1993 (aged 22)	Left-handed	Right arm off spin	
99	Ben Rohrer	Australia	26 March 1981 (aged 34)	Left-handed	–	
29	Ahillen Beadle	Australia	29 August 1986 (aged 29)	Left-handed	Left arm orthodox	
23	Jake Doran	Australia	2 December 1996 (aged 19)	Left-handed	Right arm medium	
All-rounders
3	Jacques Kallis	South Africa	16 October 1975 (aged 40)	Right-handed	Right arm fast	Visa contract
12	Andre Russell	West Indies	29 April 1988 (aged 27)	Right-handed	Right arm fast medium	Visa contract
4	Andrew McDonald	Australia	15 June 1981 (aged 34)	Right-handed	Right-arm fast-medium	
33	Shane Watson	Australia	17 June 1981 (aged 34)	Right-handed	Right-arm fast-medium	
Wicket-keepers
21	Chris Hartley	Australia	24 May 1982 (aged 33)	Left-handed	–	
Pace bowlers
30	Pat Cummins	Australia	8 May 1993 (aged 22)	Right-handed	Right arm fast	
27	Clint McKay	Australia	22 February 1983 (aged 32)	Right-handed	Right arm fast medium	
11	Gurinder Sandhu	Australia	14 February 1993 (aged 22)	Left-handed	Right arm fast medium	
8	Alister McDermott	Australia	7 June 1991 (aged 24)	Right-handed	Right arm fast medium	
Spin bowlers
93	Chris Green	Australia	1 October 1993 (aged 22)	Right-handed	Right arm off spin	
52	Fawad Ahmed	Australia	5 February 1982 (aged 33)	Right-handed	Right arm leg spin	
