= List of Melbourne Renegades cricketers =

The Melbourne Renegades is an Australian cricket club who play in the Big Bash League, the national domestic Twenty20 competition. Along with cross-town rivals, Melbourne Stars, the club was established in 2011 as an inaugural member of the eight-club league. The Big Bash League consists of a regular season and a finals series of the top four teams.

== List of players ==
As of 1 January 2020.

Players are listed according to the date of their debut for the Renegades. All statistics are for Big Bash League only.

- The number to the left of player name represents 'cap'. For players who debuted for club in the same match, player caps are ordered by alphabetical order of last name

	Player	Nationality	Seasons	Mat	Runs	HS	Ave	SR	Ct	St	Wkts	BBI	Ave	Econ	SR
1	Shahid Afridi	Pakistan	2011–2012	7	69	26	23.00	153.33	1	—	10	3/21	20.80	7.47	16.7
2	Meyrick Buchanan	Australia	2011	1	11	11	11.00	64.70	—	—	—	—	—	—	—
3	Aaron Finch	Australia	2011–2019	58	2046	111*	37.88	136.40	27	—	5	1/14	39.60	8.73	27.2
4	Aaron Heal	Australia	2011–2012	4	1	1	0.50	33.33	—	—	3	2/32	28.66	7.16	24.0
5	Graham Manou	Australia	2011–2012	7	24	18*	24.00	82.75	5	2	—	—	—	—	—
6	Glenn Maxwell	Australia	2011–2012	6	128	46	21.33	136.17	3	—	1	1/21	95.00	7.30	78.0
7	Andrew McDonald	Australia	2011–2012	7	164	60*	32.80	126.15	—	—	1	1/21	90.00	10.00	54.0
8	Dirk Nannes	Australia	2011–2012	6	4	2*	4.00	100.00	2	—	6	2/36	28.83	7.52	23.0
9	Abdul Razzaq	Pakistan	2011–2012	6	42	27*	14.00	120.00	3	—	2	1/25	61.50	9.97	37.0
10	Nathan Reardon	Australia	2011–2012	7	50	22*	12.50	100.00	5	—	—	—	—	—	—
11	Shaun Tait	Australia	2011–2012	5	0	0	0.00	0.00	—	—	4	2/31	41.00	10.25	24.0
12	Shane Harwood	Australia	2011–2012	5	3	3	3.00	100.00	—	—	7	2/26	20.00	8.23	14.5
13	William Sheridan	Australia	2011–2013	13	67	15*	13.40	98.52	7	—	11	3/28	24.54	8.43	17.4
14	Brad Hodge	Australia	2011–2018	12	258	72*	43.00	135.78	—	—	0	—	—	13.00	—
15	Jayde Herrick	Australia	2012–2013	2	0	0	0.00	—	1	—	0	—	—	8.00	—
16	Brenton McDonald	Australia	2012	1	—	—	—	—	—	—	1	1/28	28.00	9.33	18.0
17	Tom Cooper	Netherlands; Australia	2012–2019	65	1136	65*	24.17	123.88	31	—	10	2/12	28.10	7.20	23.4
18	Faf du Plessis	South Africa	2012	1	14	14	14.00	82.35	1	—	—	—	—	—	—
19	Daniel Harris	Australia	2012–2014	9	113	31	12.55	77.39	2	—	0	—	—	10.00	—
20	Muttiah Muralitharan	Sri Lanka	2012–2014	16	1	1	0.50	20.00	2	—	19	3/18	18.31	5.70	19.2
21	Peter Nevill	Australia	2012–2017	27	186	25	13.28	97.38	8	4	—	—	—	—	—
22	Aaron O'Brien	Australia	2012–2018	17	40	14*	40.00	100.00	9	—	16	3/15	26.43	7.42	21.3
23	Darren Pattinson	Australia	2012–2013	9	8	5	4.00	114.28	3	—	9	3/34	23.88	7.67	18.6
24	Nathan Rimmington	Australia	2012–2017	35	90	26	11.25	92.78	8	—	34	4/26	25.85	8.13	19.0
25	Ben Rohrer	Australia	2012–2015	23	498	57	31.12	133.51	5	—	—	—	—	—	—
26	Marlon Samuels	West Indies	2012–2013	6	73	21	14.60	121.66	3	—	8	3/16	18.12	6.59	16.5
27	Michael Hill	Australia	2013–2014	7	123	40	20.50	114.95	4	—	—	—	—	—	—
28	Alex Doolan	Australia	2013–2015	10	133	30	13.30	103.90	7	—	—	—	—	—	—
29	Fawad Ahmed	Australia	2013–2015	9	3	2	1.50	37.50	1	—	5	2/13	44.80	6.78	39.6
30	Alex Hales	England	2013	2	109	89	54.50	162.68	—	—	—	—	—	—	—
31	Jos Buttler	England	2013–2014	5	130	61	26.00	151.16	3	—	—	—	—	—	—
32	Andrew Fekete	Australia	2013–2014	4	1	1*	1.00	25.00	—	—	3	2/27	37.00	9.25	24.0
33	James Pattinson	Australia	2013–2017	14	21	13	3.50	77.77	2	—	19	4/24	23.89	9.20	15.5
34	Matthew Gale	Australia	2014	4	4	4*	—	40.00	—	—	1	1/22	103.00	8.58	72.0
35	Dwayne Bravo	West Indies	2014–2018	27	471	59*	29.43	141.86	8	—	33	5/28	24.63	8.07	18.3
36	Solomon Mire	Zimbabwe	2014	2	2	1	1.00	66.66	—	—	—	—	—	—	—
37	Peter Siddle	Australia	2014–2015	7	7	5	7.00	58.33	1	—	5	3/35	35.20	7.33	28.8
38	Callum Ferguson	Australia	2014–2017	16	348	40	26.76	130.33	7	—	—	—	—	—	—
39	Andre Russell	West Indies	2014–2015	4	86	43	43.00	186.95	1	—	4	2/20	23.50	7.94	17.7
40	Matthew Wade	Australia	2014–2016	13	245	71	20.41	118.35	8	1	—	—	—	—	—
41	Matthew Short	Australia	2014–2018	6	113	62	28.25	117.70	3	—	1	1/26	40.00	6.66	36.0
42	Nick Winter	Australia	2014–2015	3	0	0	0.00	0.00	—	—	5	3/19	11.60	6.96	10.0
43	Shakib Al Hasan	Bangladesh	2015	4	39	22	9.75	108.33	3	—	7	4/13	13.85	6.06	13.7
44	Tom Beaton	Australia	2015–2016	12	194	41*	32.33	151.56	2	—	—	—	—	—	—
45	Ben Stokes	England	2015	4	128	77	32.00	156.09	2	—	3	2/22	20.33	12.20	10.0
46	Xavier Doherty	Australia	2015–2017	8	0	0*	—	0.00	1	—	6	2/19	41.83	8.96 —	28.0
47	Chris Gayle	West Indies	2015–2016	8	260	56	32.50	155.68	1	—	0	—	—	10.00	—
48	Chris Tremain	Australia	2015–2019	23	35	27*	11.66	112.90	9	—	21	3/9	30.23	7.65	23.7
49	Guy Walker	Australia	2015	1	—	—	—	—	—	—	0	—	—	15.66	—
50	Cameron White	Australia	2015–2019	35	931	79*	34.48	118.44	11	—	—	—	—	—	—
51	Cameron Stevenson	Australia; United States	2015–2017	3	—	—	—	—	—	—	2	1/21	34.50	9.85	21.0
52	Cameron Gannon	Australia; United States	2015–2016	6	26	23	26.00	152.94	—	—	4	2/31	45.75	8.25	33.2
53	Nathan Hauritz	Australia	2015	1	—	—	—	—	—	—	0	—	—	14.50	—
54	Aaron Ayre	Australia	2016	1	0	0	0.00	0.00	—	—	—	—	—	—	—
55	Ben McDermott	Australia	2016	2	9	7	9.00	90.00	1	—	—	—	—	—	—
56	Marcus Harris	Australia	2016–2019	27	645	85	23.88	127.21	12	—	—	—	—	—	—
57	Brad Hogg	Australia	2016–2018	16	11	9*	—	73.33	3	—	15	3/22	30.80	7.70	24.0
58	Sunil Narine	West Indies	2016–2017	8	52	21	10.40	136.84	3	—	13	3/27	19.23	7.81	14.7
59	Trent Lawford	Australia	2017	2	6	4*	6.00	60.00	—	—	1	1/16	62.00	10.33	36.0
60	Thisara Perera	Sri Lanka	2017	4	40	28*	13.33	148.14	4	—	8	4/25	17.12	9.13	11.2
61	Andrew Harriott	Australia	2017	1	—	—	—	—	2	—	—	—	—	—	—
62	Tim Ludeman	Australia	2017–2018	10	33	14	11.00	110.00	10	3	—	—	—	—	—
63	Mohammad Nabi	Afghanistan	2017–2019	21	316	52	24.30	119.69	5	—	16	4/25	23.62	6.65	21.3
64	Kane Richardson	Australia	2017–2020	28	71	12*	35.50	112.69	14	—	44	4/22	18.93	7.64	14.8
65	Jack Wildermuth	Australia	2017–2020	23	86	24	7.81	96.62	3	—	16	3/16	35.62	7.88	27.1
66	Jon Holland	Australia	2018	4	1	1	1.00	33.33	3	—	1	1/16	55.00	9.16	36.0
67	Beau Webster	Australia	2018–2020	14	229	67*	38.16	129.37	10	—	0	—	—	6.80	—
68	Kieron Pollard	West Indies	2018	4	67	29*	22.33	124.07	3	—	4	2/19	17.50	10.00	10.5
69	Joe Mennie	Australia	2018–2019	3	5	5	5.00	62.50	1	—	2	1/21	48.50	8.81	33.0
70	Cameron Boyce	Australia	2018–2020	20	165	51*	16.50	142.24	4	—	19	2/16	26.36	6.57	24.0
71	Daniel Christian	Australia	2018–2020	20	284	49*	23.66	122.94	18	—	15	4/20	26.33	7.59	20.8
72	Sam Harper	Australia	2018–2020	20	406	56*	21.36	139.04	3	—	—	—	—	—	
73	Will Sutherland	Australia	2018–2020	2	8	7*	8.00	72.72	1	—	0	—	—	6.66	—
74	Usman Khan Shinwari	Pakistan	2018–2019	7	5	3*	—	83.33	2	—	8	3/16	21.50	6.14	21.0
75	Kelvin Smith	Australia	2018	1	3	3	3.00	60.00	—	—	—	—	—	—	—
76	Mackenzie Harvey	Australia	2018–2019	13	162	38	13.50	110.95	7	—	—	—	—	—	—
77	Harry Gurney	England	2019–2020	13	1	1*	1.00	50.00	1	—	13	2/26	29.61	8.02	22.1
78	Richard Gleeson	England	2019–2020	4	0	0	0.00	0.00	—	—	2	1/36	60.50	11.34	32.0
79	Shaun Marsh	Australia	2019–2020	4	150	55	37.50	127.11	—	—	—	—	—	—	—
80	Tom Andrews	Australia	2020	-	-	-	-	-	—	—	—	—	—	—	—
81	Nathan McSweeney	Australia	2020	-	-	-	-	-	—	—	—	—	—	—	—
82	Brayden Stepien	Australia	2020	-	-	-	-	-	—	—	—	—	—	—	—
83	Zak Evans	Australia	2020	-	-	-	-	-	—	—	—	—	—	—	—
84	Jake Fraser-McGurk	Australia	2020	-	-	-	-	-	—	—	—	—	—	—	—
85	Peter Hatzoglou	Australia	2020	-	-	-	-	-	—	—	—	—	—	—	—
86	Benny Howell	England	2020	-	-	-	-	-	—	—	—	—	—	—	—
87	Josh Lalor	Australia	2020	-	-	-	-	-	—	—	—	—	—	—	—
88	Jack Prestwidge	Australia	2020	-	-	-	-	-	—	—	—	—	—	—	—
89	Rilee Rossouw	South Africa	2020	-	-	-	-	-	—	—	—	—	—	—	—
90	Noor Ahmad	Afghanistan	2020	-	-	-	-	-	—	—	—	—	—	—	—
91	Imad Wasim	Pakistan	2020	-	-	-	-	-	—	—	—	—	—	—	—
92	Mitchell Perry	Australia	2021	-	-	-	-	-	—	—	—	—	—	—	—

Source: ESPN.cricinfo Renegades Batting records and ESPN.cricinfo Renegades Bowling & Fielding records

== See also ==
- Melbourne Renegades
- Big Bash League
