= 2017–18 Melbourne Renegades season =

Melbourne Renegades
2017–18 season
- Coach: Andrew McDonald
- Captain(s): Aaron Finch
- Home ground: Eithad Stadium (Capacity: 47,000); GMHBA Stadium (Capacity: 36,000)
- BBL Season: 3rd
- BBL Finals: Semi-finalists
- Leading Run Scorer: Marcus Harris (324)
- Leading Wicket Taker: Dwayne Bravo (18)
- Highest home attendance: 44,316 vs Melbourne Stars (12 January 2018)
- Lowest home attendance: 20,567 vs Brisbane Heat (23 December 2017)
- Average home attendance: 28,315

The 2017–18 Melbourne Renegades season is the seventh in the club's history. Coached by Andrew McDonald and captained by Aaron Finch, they competed in the BBL's 2017–18 season.

== Fixtures ==
=== Pre-season ===
10 December 2017
Report

Team Red; 8/189 (20 overs)	v	Team Black; 1/190 (17.1 overs)

Team Black won by 9 wickets
Geelong Cricket Ground, Geelong

15 December 2017
Report

Melbourne Renegades; 6/169 (20 overs)	v	(H) Brisbane Heat; 8/150 (20 overs)

Melbourne Renegades won by 19 runs
John Blank Oval, Maroochydore

16 December 2017
Report

Brisbane Heat (H); 6/136 (20 overs)	v	Melbourne Renegades; 1/139 (13 overs)

Melbourne Renegades won by 9 wickets
John Blank Oval, Maroochydore

=== Regular season ===
21 December 2017
19:40 (D/N)
Scorecard

(H) Hobart Hurricanes; 8/164 (20 overs)	v	Melbourne Renegades; 3/165 (18.3 overs)
D'Arcy Short 34 (19); Dwayne Bravo 5/28 (4 overs)		Cameron White 79 (59); Jofra Archer 2/17 (4 overs)

Melbourne Renegades won by 7 wickets
Bellerive Oval, Hobart
Attendance: 11,010
Umpires: Michael Graham-Smith and Sam Nogajski
Player of the match: Dwayne Bravo (Melbourne Renegades)

- Melbourne Renegades won the toss and elected to field
- Aaron Summers (Hobart Hurricanes) made his T20 debut.

23 December 2017
19:25 (D/N)
Scorecard

Brisbane Heat; 8/132 (20 overs)	v	Melbourne Renegades (H); 3/137 (18.4 overs)
Alex Ross 48 (44); Jack Wildermuth 3/16 (4 overs)		Tom Cooper 52* (44); Shadab Khan 2/17 (4 overs)

Melbourne Renegades won by 7 wickets
Etihad Stadium, Melbourne
Attendance: 20,567
Umpires: John Ward and Paul Wilson
Player of the match: Jack Wildermuth (Melbourne Renegades)

- Melbourne Renegades won the toss and elected to field.

29 December 2017
19:10 (D/N)
Scorecard

(H) Melbourne Renegades; 9/130 (20 overs)	v	Perth Scorchers; 7/133 (19 overs)
Tom Cooper 34 (24); Mitchell Johnson 3/13 (4 overs)		Michael Klinger 37 (27); Brad Hogg 2/16 (4 overs)

Perth Scorchers won by 3 wickets
Etihad Stadium, Melbourne
Attendance: 30,018
Umpires: Phillip Gillespie and Tony Wilds
Player of the match: Mitchell Johnson (Perth Scorchers)

- Perth Scorchers won the toss and elected to field.

3 January 2018
19:10 (D/N)
Scorecard

Sydney Sixers; 8/111 (20 overs)	v	Melbourne Renegades (H); 2/112 (15.3 overs)
Johan Botha 32* (23); Dwayne Bravo 3/29 (4 overs)		Aaron Finch 51 (38); Ben Dwarshuis 1/19 (4 overs)

Melbourne Renegades won by 8 wickets
GMHBA Stadium, Geelong
Attendance: 23,586
Umpires: Greg Davidson and Simon Fry
Player of the match: Aaron Finch (Melbourne Renegades)

- Melbourne Renegades won the toss and elected to field
- Mickey Edwards (Sydney Sixers) made his T20 debut.

6 January 2018
19:10 (D/N)
Scorecard

(H) Melbourne Stars; 4/157 (20 overs)	v	Melbourne Renegades; 4/159 (17.5 overs)
Ben Dunk 47 (30); Mohammad Nabi 1/27 (4 overs)		Mohammad Nabi 52 (30); John Hastings 2/24 (3.5 overs)

Melbourne Renegades won by 6 wickets
Melbourne Cricket Ground, Melbourne
Attendance: 48,086
Umpires: Shawn Craig and John Ward
Player of the match: Mohammad Nabi (Melbourne Renegades)

- Melbourne Renegades won the toss and elected to field
- Jackson Coleman (Melbourne Stars) made his T20 debut.

8 January 2018
18:20 (D/N)
Scorecard

Melbourne Renegades; 3/185 (20 overs)	v	Perth Scorchers (H); 5/186 (19.5 overs)
Cameron White 68* (30); Andrew Tye 2/36 (4 overs)		Ashton Turner 70 (32); Mohammed Nabi 1/30 (3.5 overs)

Perth Scorchers won by 5 wickets
WACA Ground, Perth
Attendance: 22,475
Umpires: Michael Graham-Smith & Sam Nogajski
Player of the match: Ashton Turner (Perth Scorchers)

- Perth Scorchers won the toss and elected to field

12 January 2018
19:40 (D/N)
Scorecard

Melbourne Stars; 4/167 (20 overs)	v	(H) Melbourne Renegades; 9/144 (20 overs)
Kevin Pietersen 74 (46); Mohammad Nabi 2/15 (4 overs)		Dwayne Bravo 26 (18); Jackson Coleman 3/27 (4 overs)

Melbourne Stars won by 23 runs
Etihad Stadium, Melbourne
Attendance: 44,316
Umpires: Michael Graham-Smith and Geoff Joshua
Player of the match: Kevin Pietersen (Melbourne Stars)

- Melbourne Renegades won the toss and elected to field
- Daniel Fallins (Melbourne Stars) made his T20 debut.

22 January 2018
19:40 (D/N)
Scorecard

Adelaide Strikers; 5/173 (20 overs)	v	(H) Melbourne Renegades; 7/147 (20 overs)
Colin Ingram 68 (36); Dwayne Bravo 2/30 (4 overs)		Brad Hodge 30* (18); Ben Laughlin 2/18 (4 overs)

Adelaide Strikers won by 26 runs
Etihad Stadium, Melbourne
Attendance: 23,089
Umpires: Michael Graham-Smith and Geoff Joshua
Player of the match: Colin Ingram (Adelaide Strikers)

- Melbourne Renegades won the toss and elected to field

24 January 2018
19:40 (D/N)
Scorecard

Melbourne Renegades; 6/189 (20 overs)	v	(H) Sydney Thunder; 180 (20 overs)
Marcus Harris 64 (41); Gurinder Sandhu 2/37 (4 overs)		Ben Rohrer 48 (21); Kane Richardson 4/22 (4 overs)

Melbourne Renegades won by 9 runs
Manuka Oval, Canberra
Attendance: 11,319
Umpires: Shawn Craig and John Ward
Player of the match: Kane Richardson (Melbourne Renegades)

- Sydney Thunder won the toss and elected to field

27 January 2018
18:20 (D/N)
Scorecard

Melbourne Renegades; 3/187 (20 overs)	v	(H) Brisbane Heat; 161 (19.5 overs)
Tom Cooper 65* (36); Mitchell Swepson 1/27 (4 overs)		Alex Ross 36 (27); Kane Richardson 4/35 (4 overs)

Melbourne Renegades won by 26 runs
The Gabba, Brisbane
Attendance: 34,543
Umpires: Gerard Abood and Phillip Gillespie
Player of the match: Tom Cooper (Melbourne Renegades)

- Brisbane Heat won the toss and elected to field

=== Knockout phase ===
==== Semi final ====
2 February 2018
19:10 (D/N)
Scorecard

(H) Adelaide Strikers; 5/178 (20 overs)	v	Melbourne Renegades; 4/177 (20 overs)
Travis Head 85* (57); Joe Mennie 1/21 (4 overs)		Marcus Harris 45 (27); Travis Head 1/27 (4 overs)

Adelaide Strikers won by 1 run
Adelaide Oval, Adelaide
Attendance: 36,298
Umpires: Shawn Craig and Phillip Gillespie
Player of the match: Travis Head (Adelaide Strikers)

- Adelaide Strikers won the toss and elected to bat
- Harry Nielsen (Adelaide Strikers) made his T20 debut.

== Ladder ==
Pos	Team	Pld	W	L	NR	Pts	NRR	Qualification
1	Perth Scorchers	10	8	2	0	16	0.154	Advanced to semi-finals
2	Adelaide Strikers (C)	10	7	3	0	14	0.801	Advanced to semi-finals
3	Melbourne Renegades	10	6	4	0	12	0.297	Advanced to semi-finals
4	Hobart Hurricanes	10	5	5	0	10	−0.291	Advanced to semi-finals
5	Sydney Sixers	10	4	6	0	8	0.331	
6	Sydney Thunder	10	4	6	0	8	−0.039	
7	Brisbane Heat	10	4	6	0	8	−0.437	
8	Melbourne Stars	10	2	8	0	4	−0.926	

(C) Champions

== Squad information ==
The following is the Renegades men squad for the 2017–18 Big Bash League season as of 28 January 2018.

S/N	Name	Nationality	Date of birth (age)	Batting style	Bowling style	Notes
Batsmen
5	Aaron Finch	Australia	17 November 1986 (age 39)	Right-handed	Left arm orthodox	Captain
26	Tom Cooper	Netherlands	26 November 1986 (age 39)	Right-handed	Right arm off spin	Non-visa Dutch international
9	Matt Short	Australia	8 November 1995 (age 30)	Right-handed	Right arm off spin	
7	Cameron White	Australia	18 August 1983 (age 42)	Right-handed	Right arm leg break	
21	Marcus Harris	Australia	21 July 1992 (age 33)	Left-handed	–	
17	Brad Hodge	Australia	29 December 1974 (age 51)	Right-handed	Right Arm off spin	
20	Beau Webster	Australia	1 December 1993 (age 32)	Right-handed	Right arm off break	
29	Travis Dean	Australia	1 February 1992 (age 34)	Right-handed	–	Replacement player for Cameron White
All-rounders
47	Dwayne Bravo	West Indies	7 October 1983 (age 42)	Right-handed	Right arm medium fast	Visa contract
10	Jack Wildermuth	Australia	21 December 1993 (age 32)	Right-handed	Right arm medium fast	
12	Will Sutherland	Australia	27 October 1999 (age 26)	Right-handed	Right arm fast medium	Rookie contract
77	Mohammad Nabi	Afghanistan	1 January 1985 (age 41)	Right-handed	Right arm off break	Visa contract
00	Kieron Pollard	West Indies	12 May 1987 (age 39)	Right-handed	Right arm medium fast	Visa contract, replacement player for Mohammad Nabi
3	Mackenzie Harvey	Australia	18 September 2000 (age 25)	Left-handed	Right arm medium fast	Replacement player for Aaron Finch
Wicketkeepers
15	Tim Ludeman	Australia	23 June 1987 (age 39)	Right-handed	–	
Pace bowlers
19	James Pattinson	Australia	3 May 1990 (age 36)	Left-handed	Right arm fast	
34	Chris Tremain	Australia	10 August 1991 (age 34)	Right-handed	Right arm fast medium	
4	Guy Walker	Australia	12 September 1995 (age 30)	Right-handed	Right arm medium fast	
55	Kane Richardson	Australia	12 February 1991 (age 35)	Right-handed	Right arm fast medium	
16	Joe Mennie	Australia	24 December 1988 (age 37)	Right-handed	Right arm fast medium	
2	Xavier Crone	Australia	19 December 1997 (age 28)	Right-handed	Right arm fast medium	
Spin bowlers
31	Brad Hogg	Australia	6 February 1971 (age 55)	Left-handed	Slow left-arm wrist-spin	
18	Jon Holland	Australia	29 May 1987 (age 39)	Right-handed	Left-arm orthodox spin	

== Transfers ==
In:

Name	Moving from	Ref.
Brad Hodge	Adelaide Strikers	
Beau Webster	Hobart Hurricanes	
Travis Dean	Unattached	
Jack Wildermuth	Brisbane Heat	
Will Sutherland*	Unattached	
Mohammad Nabi	Unattached	
Kieron Pollard	Adelaide Strikers	
Mackenzie Harvey	Unattached	
Tim Ludeman	Adelaide Strikers	
Kane Richardson	Adelaide Strikers	
Joe Mennie	Sydney Sixers	
Xavier Crone	Unattached	
Jon Holland	Adelaide Strikers	

Out:

Name	Moving to	Ref.
Tom Beaton	Delisted	
Callum Ferguson	Sydney Thunder	
Cameron Stevenson	Delisted	
Trent Lawford	Delisted	
Thisara Perera	Delisted	
Peter Nevill	Sydney Sixers	
Matthew Wade	Hobart Hurricanes	
Andrew Harriott	Delisted	
Nathan Rimmington	Delisted	
Peter Siddle	Adelaide Strikers	
Nicholas Winter	Adelaide Strikers	
Xavier Doherty	Retired	
Sunil Narine	Delisted	

== Season statistics ==
=== Most runs ===
Player	Mat	Inns	Runs	Ave	SR	HS	100	50
Marcus Harris	11	11	324	29.45	129.08	64	0	2
Cameron White	8	8	304	76.00	111.35	79*	0	3
Tom Cooper	11	9	298	49.66	141.23	65*	0	3
Aaron Finch	6	6	108	18.00	136.70	51	0	1
Matthew Short	3	3	106	35.33	121.83	62	0	1

Source: ESPNcricinfo, 3 February 2018

=== Most wickets ===
Player	Mat	Inns	Wkts	Ave	Econ	BBI	SR
Dwayne Bravo	11	11	18	20.16	8.47	5/28	14.2
Kane Richardson	10	10	12	26.16	8.05	4/22	19.5
Jack Wildermuth	11	11	10	31.10	8.18	3/16	22.8
Mohammad Nabi	7	7	8	18.62	5.76	2/15	19.3
Chris Tremain	4	4	7	17.00	7.93	3/29	12.8

Source: ESPNcricinfo, 3 February 2018

=== Home attendance ===
Match	Opponent	Attendance
2	Brisbane Heat	20,567
3	Perth Scorchers	30,018
4	Sydney Sixers	23,586
7	Melbourne Stars	44,316
8	Adelaide Strikers	23,089
Total Attendance		141,576
Average Attendance		28,315

=== TV audience ===
BBL games are currently broadcast in Australia by the free-to-air channel Network Ten.

Following are the television ratings for the Melbourne Renegades's 2017–18 BBL season matches in Australia.

Match No	Teams	Average TV Ratings			
Match No	Teams	National		5 metro cities	
Match No	Teams	Session 1	Session 2	Session 1	Session 2
1	Hobart Hurricanes vs Melbourne Renegades	1,100,000	1,230,000	747,000	856,000
2	Melbourne Renegades vs Brisbane Heat	975,000	1,090,000	660,000	765,000
3	Melbourne Renegades vs Perth Scorchers	865,000	1,100,000	600,000	788,000
4	Melbourne Renegades vs Sydney Sixers	916,000	1,170,000	594,000	771,000
5	Melbourne Stars vs Melbourne Renegades	876,000	1,120,000	620,000	789,000
6	Perth Scorchers vs Melbourne Renegades	971,000	621,000	687,000	452,000
7	Melbourne Renegades vs Melbourne Stars	1,040,000	1,120,000	670,000	751,000
8	Melbourne Renegades vs Adelaide Strikers	883,000	853,000	603,000	607,000
9	Sydney Thunder vs Melbourne Renegades	808,000	873,000	532,000	597,000
10	Brisbane Heat vs Melbourne Renegades	742,000	797,000	481,000	553,000
SF	Adelaide Strikers vs Melbourne Renegades	1,050,000	1,340,000	739,000	991,000
