= 2014–15 Big Bash League season =

Cricket tournament

2014–15 Big Bash League
- Dates: 18 December 2014 – 28 January 2015
- Administrator: Cricket Australia
- Cricket format: Twenty20
- Tournament format(s): Group stage and knockout
- Champions: Perth Scorchers (2nd title)
- Participants: 8
- Matches: 35
- Attendance: 825,657 (23,590 per match)
- Player of the series: Jacques Kallis (Sydney Thunder)
- Most runs: Michael Klinger (326), (Perth Scorchers)
- Most wickets: John Hastings (16), (Melbourne Stars)
- Official website: bigbash.com.au

The 2014–15 Big Bash League season or BBL|04 was the fourth season of the Big Bash League (BBL), the top-class Twenty20 cricket competition in Australia. The season ran from 18 December 2014 to 28 January 2015, two weeks longer than the previous season.

Perth Scorchers won back-to-back titles by defeating Sydney Sixers by four wickets in the final. It was hosted at Canberra's Manuka Oval. Jacques Kallis of Sydney Thunder was named Player of the Tournament, scoring 235 runs and taking six wickets, and Jason Behrendorff of Perth Scorchers was named Young Gun of the Tournament after taking 15 wickets.

== Squads ==
Adelaide Strikers	Brisbane Heat	Hobart Hurricanes	Melbourne Renegades	Melbourne Stars	Perth Scorchers	Sydney Sixers	Sydney Thunder
Johan Botha (c); Jono Dean; Travis Head; Brad Hodge; Jon Holland; Hamish Kingston; Ben Laughlin; Trent Lawford; Tim Ludeman; Kieron Pollard; Gary Putland; Kane Richardson; Alex Ross; Chadd Sayers; Craig Simmons; Shaun Tait; Ryan ten Doeschate; Adam Zampa; Michael Neser	James Hopes (c); James Bazley; Joe Burns; Daniel Christian; Ben Cutting; Ryan Duffield; Andrew Flintoff; Jason Floros; Peter Forrest; Cameron Gannon; Mitchell Johnson; Chris Lynn; Alister McDermott; Simon Milenko; Jimmy Peirson; Nathan Reardon; Mark Steketee; Daniel Vettori; Shane Watson; Samuel Badree; Nick Buchanan	George Bailey (c); Travis Birt; Cameron Boyce; Tim Bresnan; Xavier Doherty; Ben Dunk; Evan Gulbis; Alex Hales; Ben Hilfenhaus; Michael Hill; Ryan Lees; Joe Mennie; Dom Michael; Tim Paine; Sam Rainbird; Jake Reed; Darren Sammy; Shoaib Malik; Timm van der Gugten; Beau Webster; Jonathan Wells; Sean Willis	Shakib Al Hasan; Aaron Finch (c); Ben Ashkenazi; Tom Beaton; Dwayne Bravo; Tom Cooper; Alex Doolan; Fawad Ahmed; Andrew Fekete; Callum Ferguson; Jayde Herrick; Peter Nevill; Aaron O'Brien; James Pattinson; Nathan Rimmington; Ben Rohrer; Andre Russell; Jesse Ryder; Matthew Short; Lega Siaka; Peter Siddle; Matthew Wade; Nicholas Winter	Cameron White (c); Michael Beer; Jackson Bird; Scott Boland; James Faulkner; Luke Feldman; Peter Handscomb; John Hastings; David Hussey; Alex Keath; Clint McKay; Glenn Maxwell; Kevin Pietersen; Rob Quiney; Clive Rose; Marcus Stoinis; Daniel Worrall; Luke Wright	Adam Voges (c); Ashton Agar; Jason Behrendorff; Michael Carberry; Hilton Cartwright; Nathan Coulter-Nile; Brad Hogg; Michael Klinger; Simon Mackin; Mitchell Marsh; Shaun Marsh; James Muirhead; Joel Paris; Ashton Turner; Andrew Tye; Sam Whiteman; Yasir Arafat	Brad Haddin (c); Sean Abbott; Josh Anderson; Doug Bollinger; Ryan Carters; Trent Copeland; Ben Dwarshuis; Moises Henriques; Brett Lee; Michael Lumb; Nathan Lyon; Nic Maddinson; Steve O'Keefe; Jordan Silk; Steve Smith; Mitchell Starc; Riki Wessels	Michael Hussey (c); Ahillen Beadle; Aiden Blizzard; Pat Cummins; Jake Doran; Chris Green; Chris Hartley; Nathan Hauritz; Daniel Hughes; Jacques Kallis; Craig Kieswetter; Josh Lalor; Andrew McDonald; Eoin Morgan; Dirk Nannes; Kurtis Patterson; Gurinder Sandhu; Chris Tremain; Usman Khawaja

== League stage ==
There were 32 matches played during the group stage of the fourth edition of the Big Bash League. To address poor attendances and late finishing matches most matches started half an hour earlier, with matches in this time slot now 07:10pm AEDST. However, some matches including the final still started at 07:40pm AEDST.

=== Points table ===
Pos	Team	Pld	W	L	NR	Pts	NRR	Qualification
1	Adelaide Strikers	8	6	1	1	13	1.159	Advanced to semi-finals
2	Perth Scorchers (C)	8	5	3	0	10	0.705	Advanced to semi-finals
3	Melbourne Stars	8	5	3	0	10	0.336	Advanced to semi-finals
4	Sydney Sixers	8	5	3	0	10	−0.014	Advanced to semi-finals
5	Hobart Hurricanes	8	3	5	0	6	−0.280	
6	Melbourne Renegades	8	3	5	0	6	−0.331	
7	Sydney Thunder	8	2	5	1	5	−0.485	
8	Brisbane Heat	8	2	6	0	4	−1.116	

(C) Champions

=== Match summary ===
Visitor team →	ADS	BRH	HBH	MLR	MLS	PRS	SYS	SYT
Home team ↓	ADS	BRH	HBH	MLR	MLS	PRS	SYS	SYT
Adelaide Strikers			Strikers; 8 wickets		Strikers; 8 wickets	Scorchers; 18 runs		Match abandoned
Brisbane Heat	Strikers; 5 wickets		Heat; 18 runs		Heat; 1 run		Sixers; 6 wickets	
Hobart Hurricanes		Hurricanes; 6 wickets		Renegades; 37 runs		Scorchers; 18 runs	Sixers; 7 wickets	
Melbourne Renegades	Strikers; 22 runs	Renegades; 5 wickets			Stars; 112 runs			Renegades; 8 wickets
Melbourne Stars			Hurricanes; 52 runs	Stars; 3 wickets		Stars; 3 wickets	Stars; Super Over	
Perth Scorchers	Strikers; 1 wicket	Scorchers; 8 wickets		Scorchers; 35 runs				Thunder; 20 runs
Sydney Sixers	Strikers; 23 runs			Sixers; 8 wickets		Scorchers; 36 runs		Sixers; 4 wickets
Sydney Thunder		Thunder; 56 runs	Hurricanes; 5 wickets (D/L)		Stars; 8 wickets		Sixers; 16 runs	

Home team won	Visitor team won

- Note: Results listed are according to the home (horizontal) and visitor (vertical) teams.
- Note: Click on a result to see a summary of the match.

=== Matches ===
18 December
19:10 (D/N)
Scorecard

Melbourne Stars; 7/148 (20 overs)	v	Adelaide Strikers (H); 2/149 (12.3 overs)
Kevin Pietersen 66 (46); Kane Richardson 2/20 (3 overs)		Tim Ludeman 92* (44); John Hastings 2/31 (2.3 overs)

Adelaide Strikers won by 8 wickets
Adelaide Oval
Attendance: 27,635
Umpires: Michael Graham-Smith and John Ward
Player of the match: Tim Ludeman (Strikers)

- Melbourne Stars won the toss and elected to bat
- Tim Ludeman (Strikers) scored the fastest fifty (18 balls) in the Big Bash League to this point

19 December
19:40 (D/N)
Scorecard

Melbourne Renegades; 7/154 (20 overs)	v	Sydney Sixers (H); 2/158 (18.5 overs)
Callum Ferguson 40 (32); Sean Abbott 2/20 (4 overs)		Nic Maddinson 84* (54); Nathan Rimmington 1/22 (3 overs)

Sydney Sixers won by 8 wickets
Sydney Cricket Ground
Attendance: 12,337
Umpires: Ashley Barrow and Damien Mealey
Player of the match: Nic Maddinson (Sixers)

- Sydney Sixers won the toss and elected to field
- Ben Dwarshuis (Sixers) made his Twenty20 debut

20 December
19:10 (D/N)
Scorecard

Hobart Hurricanes; 5/190 (20 overs)	v	Melbourne Stars (H); 9/138 (20 overs)
Jonathan Wells 68 (44); John Hastings 3/24 (4 overs)		Cameron White 62 (48); Ben Hilfenhaus 4/27 (4 overs)

Hobart Hurricanes won by 52 runs
Melbourne Cricket Ground
Attendance: 18,284
Umpires: Mick Martell and Geoff Joshua
Player of the match: Darren Sammy (Hurricanes)

- Melbourne Stars won the toss and elected to field

21 December
19:10 (D/N)
Scorecard

(H) Sydney Thunder; 1/208 (20 overs)	v	Brisbane Heat; 152 (17.4 overs)
Jacques Kallis 97* (55); Cameron Gannon 1/47 (4 overs)		Nathan Reardon 49 (25); Gurinder Sandhu 3/19 (3 overs)

Sydney Thunder won by 56 runs
ANZ Stadium, Sydney
Attendance: 10,733
Umpires: Damien Mealey and John Ward
Player of the match: Jacques Kallis (Thunder)

- Brisbane Heat won the toss and elected to field
- Simon Milenko (Heat) made his Twenty20 debut

22 December
16:10 (D/N)
Scorecard

(H) Perth Scorchers; 7/146 (20 overs)	v	Adelaide Strikers; 9/147 (19.4 overs)
Michael Klinger 49 (33); Kane Richardson 3/31 (4 overs)		Brad Hodge 42 (36); Jason Behrendorff 4/22 (4 overs)

Adelaide Strikers won by 1 wicket
#TheFurnace, Perth
Attendance: 18,809
Umpires: Ashley Barrow (Aus) and Greg Davidson (Aus)
Player of the match: Jason Behrendorff (Scorchers)

- Perth Scorchers won the toss and elected to bat
- Marcus Harris (Scorchers) and Trent Lawford (Strikers) made their Twenty20 debuts

23 December
19:10 (D/N)
Scorecard

(H) Hobart Hurricanes; 8/154 (19 overs)	v	Sydney Sixers; 3/158 (18.1 overs)
George Bailey 71 (44); Brett Lee 3/34 (4 overs)		Michael Lumb 44 (31); Cameron Boyce 1/24 (4 overs)

Sydney Sixers won by 7 wickets
Bellerive Oval, Hobart
Attendance: 13,140
Umpires: Paul Wilson (Aus) and Michael Graham-Smith (Aus)
Player of the match: Moises Henriques (Sixers)

- Hobart Hurricanes won the toss and elected to bat
- Match reduced to 19 overs per side due to rain
- Sydney Sixers took a team hat-trick

26 December
16:10 (D/N)
Scorecard

(H) Perth Scorchers; 3/192 (20 overs)	v	Melbourne Renegades; 9/157 (20 overs)
Michael Klinger 105* (60); Matthew Short 1/26 (3 overs)		Andre Russell 43 (21); Jason Behrendorff 2/16 (4 overs)

Perth Scorchers won by 35 runs
#TheFurnace, Perth
Attendance: 18,207
Umpires: Mick Martell (Aus) and Gerard Abood (Aus)
Player of the match: Michael Klinger (Scorchers)

- Perth Scorchers won the toss and elected to bat
- Matt Dixon (Scorchers), Nicholas Winter and Matthew Short (both Renegades) made their Twenty20 debuts

27 December
19:10 (D/N)
Scorecard

Sydney Sixers; 7/180 (20 overs)	v	Sydney Thunder (H); 5/164 (20 overs)
Riki Wessels 50 (33); Gurinder Sandhu 2/28 (4 overs)		Aiden Blizzard 80* (42); Sean Abbott 2/28 (4 overs)

Sydney Sixers won by 16 runs
ANZ Stadium, Sydney
Attendance: 32,823
Umpires: Paul Wilson (Aus) and Sam Nojagski (Aus)
Player of the match: Aiden Blizzard (Thunder)

- Sydney Thunder won the toss and elected to field
- The crowd of 32,823 was the highest in NSW domestic cricket history

28 December
18:10 (D/N)
Scorecard

(H) Brisbane Heat; 8/164 (20 overs)	v	Melbourne Stars; 7/163 (20 overs)
Chris Lynn 48 (34); James Faulkner 2/26 (4 overs)		Rob Quiney 45* (31); Ryan Duffield 3/28 (4 overs)

Brisbane Heat won by 1 run
The Gabba, Woolloongabba, Brisbane
Attendance: 26,733
Umpires: Michael Graham-Smith (Aus) and Damien Mealey (Aus)
Player of the match: Ryan Duffield (Heat)

- Melbourne Stars won the toss and elected to field

29 December
19:10 (D/N)
Scorecard

Perth Scorchers; 7/135 (20 overs)	v	Sydney Sixers (H); 99 (17.3 overs)
Marcus Harris 36 (26); Mitchell Starc 2/21 (4 overs)		Riki Wessels 28 (26); Ashton Turner 2/3 (1 over)

Perth Scorchers won by 36 runs
Sydney Cricket Ground
Attendance: 24,276
Umpires: Sam Nojagski (Aus) and Shawn Craig (Aus)
Player of the match: Andrew Tye (Scorchers)

- Perth Scorchers won the toss and elected to bat

30 December
19:10 (D/N)
Scorecard

Sydney Thunder; 6/114 (20 overs)	v	Melbourne Renegades (H); 2/118 (13.5 overs)
Daniel Hughes 40* (35); James Pattinson 3/24 (4 overs)		Aaron Finch 48 (37); Dirk Nannes 1/18 (2 overs)

Melbourne Renegades won by 8 wickets
Etihad Stadium, Melbourne
Attendance: 22,534
Umpires: Ashley Barrow (Aus) and Rod Tucker (Aus)
Player of the match: James Pattinson (Renegades)

- Melbourne Renegades won the toss and elected to field

31 December
18:40 (D/N)
Scorecard

Hobart Hurricanes; 8/136 (20 overs)	v	Adelaide Strikers (H); 2/141 (14.3 overs)
Jonathan Wells 56* (35); Shaun Tait 3/20 (4 overs)		Tim Ludeman 54 (33); Darren Sammy 1/10 (3 overs)

Adelaide Strikers won by 8 wickets
Adelaide Oval
Attendance: 43,288
Umpires: Greg Davidson (Aus) and Mick Martell (Aus)
Player of the match: Tim Ludeman (Strikers)

- Hobart Hurricanes won the toss and elected to bat
- The sold-out crowd of 43,288 was the highest in South Australia domestic cricket history

1 January
16:10 (D/N)
Scorecard

Sydney Thunder; 3/178 (20 overs)	v	Perth Scorchers (H); 5/159 (20 overs)
Jacques Kallis 70 (49); Andrew Tye 1/26 (4 overs)		Michael Carberry 69* (48); Jacques Kallis 2/24 (4 overs)

Sydney Thunder won by 20 runs
#TheFurnace, Perth
Attendance: 17,633
Umpires: Michael Graham-Smith (Aus) and Shawn Craig (Aus)
Player of the match: Jacques Kallis (Thunder)

- Sydney Thunder won the toss and elected to bat

2 January
19:10 (D/N)
Scorecard

Brisbane Heat; 6/208 (20 overs)	v	Hobart Hurricanes (H); 4/209 (19 overs)
Peter Forrest 62 (43); Cameron Boyce 3/40 (4 overs)		Ben Dunk 67 (40); Andrew Flintoff 1/28 (2 overs)

Hobart Hurricanes won by 6 wickets
Bellerive Oval, Hobart
Attendance: 14,744
Umpires: Ashley Barrow and John Ward
Player of the match: Ben Dunk (Hurricanes)

- Hobart Hurricanes won the toss and elected to field
- Jake Reed (Hurricanes) made his Twenty20 debut and the crowd of 14,744 was the highest in Tasmanian domestic cricket history

3 January
19:10 (D/N)
Scorecard

Melbourne Stars; 6/169 (20 overs)	v	Melbourne Renegades (H); 57 (12.4 overs)
Luke Wright 39 (21); Dwayne Bravo 3/22 (3 overs)		Tom Cooper 10 (15); Michael Beer 2/14 (4 overs)

Melbourne Stars won by 112 runs
Etihad Stadium, Melbourne
Attendance: 33,734
Umpires: Geoff Joshua and Paul Wilson
Player of the match: Michael Beer (Stars)

- Melbourne Renegades won the toss and elected to field
- Melbourne Renegades score of 57 was the lowest score in BBL history

4 January
18:10 (D/N)
Scorecard

(H) Brisbane Heat; 6/152 (20 overs)	v	Adelaide Strikers; 5/158 (18.5 overs)
Peter Forrest 33 (31); Craig Simmons 2/26 (4 overs)		Travis Head 57* (40); Cameron Gannon 2/32 (2.5 overs)

Adelaide Strikers won by 5 wickets
The Gabba, Woolloongabba, Brisbane
Attendance: 28,832
Umpires: Ashley Barrow and John Ward
Player of the match: Travis Head (Strikers)

- Adelaide Strikers won the toss and elected to field.

5 January
19:10 (D/N)
Scorecard

Sydney Sixers; 6/150 (20 overs)	v	Melbourne Stars (H); 4/150 (20 overs)
Michael Lumb 80 (61); Scott Boland 2/19 (4 overs)		Kevin Pietersen 54 (43); Ben Dwarshuis 2/31 (4 overs)

Scores level;Stars won the Super Over
Melbourne Cricket Ground
Attendance: 22,098
Umpires: Sam Nojagski and Paul Wilson
Player of the match: James Faulkner (Stars)

- Melbourne Stars won the toss and elected to field

6 January
18:40 (D/N)
Scorecard

Perth Scorchers; 6/133 (20 overs)	v	Adelaide Strikers (H); 115 (19.3 overs)
Adam Voges 54* (36); Adam Zampa 2/26 (4 overs)		Tim Ludeman 22 (21); Brad Hogg 2/11 (4 overs)

Perth Scorchers won by 18 runs
Adelaide Oval
Attendance: 42,654
Umpires: Damien Mealey and Geoff Joshua
Player of the match: Brad Hogg (Scorchers)

- Adelaide Strikers won the toss and elected to field

7 January
19:10 (D/N)
Scorecard

Melbourne Renegades; 7/163 (20 overs)	v	Hobart Hurricanes (H); 126 (19.2 overs)
Ben Stokes 77* (37); Ben Hilfenhaus 3/32 (4 overs)		George Bailey 20 (24); Nicholas Winter 3/19 (3.2 overs)

Melbourne Renegades won by 37 runs
Bellerive Oval, Hobart
Attendance: 13,918
Umpires: John Ward and Shawn Craig
Player of the match: Ben Stokes (Renegades)

- Hobart Hurricanes won the toss and elected to field

8 January
16:10 (D/N)
Scorecard

Brisbane Heat; 7/134 (20 overs)	v	Perth Scorchers (H); 2/137 (15.5 overs)
Nathan Reardon 52* (40); Brad Hogg 2/14 (4 overs)		Michael Carberry 77* (37); Ben Cutting 1/19 (3 overs)

Perth Scorchers won by 8 wickets
#TheFurnace, Perth
Attendance: 19,437
Umpires: Mick Martell and Sam Nojagski
Player of the match: Michael Carberry (Scorchers)

- Brisbane Heat won the toss and elected to bat

9 January
19:10 (D/N)
Scorecard

(H) Sydney Thunder; 7/77 (17 overs)	v	Hobart Hurricanes; 5/84 (13.5 overs)
Daniel Hughes 26 (22); Jake Reed 4/11 (4 overs)		Michael Hill 24 (23); Jacques Kallis 2/18 (4 overs)

Hobart Hurricanes won by 5 wickets (D/L)
Sydney Showground Stadium
Attendance: 15,880
Umpires: Greg Davidson and Rod Tucker
Player of the match: Jake Reed (Hurricanes)

- Hobart Hurricanes won the toss and elected to field
- Match was reduced to 17 overs per side and Hobart's target extended to 81 due to rain

10 January
19:10 (D/N)
Scorecard

Melbourne Renegades; 6/153 (20 overs)	v	Melbourne Stars (H); 7/154 (20 overs)
Matthew Wade 71 (49); James Faulkner 3/19 (3 overs)		Glenn Maxwell 66 (44); Ben Stokes 2/22 (2 overs)

Melbourne Stars won by 3 wickets
Melbourne Cricket Ground
Attendance: 37,323
Umpires: Mick Martell and Shawn Craig
Player of the match: Glenn Maxwell (Stars)

- Melbourne Renegades won the toss and elected to bat

11 January
13:45
Scorecard

Perth Scorchers; 8/141 (20 overs)	v	Hobart Hurricanes (H); 7/123 (20 overs)
Ashton Turner 37 (25); Tim Bresnan 3/18 (4 overs)		Michael Hill 64 (55); Yasir Arafat 2/21 (4 overs)

Perth Scorchers won by 18 runs
Bellerive Oval, Hobart
Attendance: 13,303
Umpires: Michael Graham-Smith and Ashley Barrow
Player of the match: Jason Behrendorff (Scorchers)

- Perth Scorchers won the toss and elected to bat
- Perth Scorchers secured their place in the semi-finals

11 January
18:10 (D/N)
Scorecard

(H) Brisbane Heat; 6/147 (20 overs)	v	Sydney Sixers; 4/148 (17.4 overs)
Peter Forrest 62* (56); Brett Lee 2/29 (4 overs)		Ryan Carters 30* (21); James Hopes 2/23 (3 overs)

Sydney Sixers won by 6 wickets
The Gabba, Woolloongabba, Brisbane
Attendance: 28,724
Umpires: Paul Wilson and Damien Mealey
Player of the match: Doug Bollinger (Sixers)

- Sydney Sixers won the toss and elected to field

12 January
18:40 (D/N)
Scorecard

(H) Adelaide Strikers; 5/119 (10 overs)	v	Sydney Thunder; 0/18 (1 over)
Alex Ross 30* (11); Chris Tremain 2/32 (2 overs)		Jason Roy 14* (6); Kane Richardson 0/14 (1 over)

Match Abandoned
Adelaide Oval
Attendance: 30,473
Umpires: Simon Fry and Bruce Oxenford

- Sydney Thunder won the toss and elected to field
- Match reduced to 10 overs per side and play suspended after 1 over of Thunder's innings due to rain
- Ahillen Beadle (Thunder) made his Twenty20 debut

13 January
19:10 (D/N)
Scorecard

Brisbane Heat; 80 (17.3 overs)	v	Melbourne Renegades (H); 5/81 (14 overs)
Ben Cutting 30 (35); Shakib Al Hasan 4/13 (4 overs)		Tom Beaton 31* (16); Dan Christian 2/13 (4 overs)

Melbourne Renegades won by 5 wickets
Etihad Stadium, Melbourne
Attendance: 17,276
Umpires: Geoff Joshua and John Ward
Player of the match: Shakib Al Hasan (Renegades)

- Melbourne Renegades won the toss and elected to field

14 January
19:10 (D/N)
Scorecard

Adelaide Strikers; 6/182 (20 overs)	v	Sydney Sixers (H); 159 (19.4 overs)
Craig Simmons 46 (34); Steve O'Keefe 1/21 (4 overs)		Jordan Silk 67 (34); Johan Botha 2/27 (4 overs)

Adelaide Strikers won by 23 runs
Sydney Cricket Ground
Attendance: 18,739
Umpires: Sam Nojagski and Michael Graham-Smith
Player of the match: Johan Botha (Strikers)

- Adelaide Strikers won the toss and elected to bat

15 January
18:40 (D/N)
Scorecard

(H) Brisbane Heat; 6/198 (20 overs)	v	Hobart Hurricanes; 8/180 (20 overs)
Chris Lynn 81 (35); Shoaib Malik 3/37 (4 overs)		Shoaib Malik 42 (23); Mark Steketee 2/28 (4 overs)

Brisbane Heat won by 18 runs
The Gabba, Woolloongabba, Brisbane
Attendance: 16,376
Umpires: Gerard Abood and Paul Wilson
Player of the match: Chris Lynn (Heat)

- Hobart Hurricanes won the toss and elected to field
- Chris Lynn (Heat) scored the equal-fastest fifty in Big Bash League history (18 balls)

17 January
19:10 (D/N)
Scorecard

(H) Sydney Thunder; 8/106 (20 overs)	v	Melbourne Stars; 2/107 (14.3 overs)
Aiden Blizzard 45 (48); Michael Beer 2/14 (4 overs)		Kevin Pietersen 67* (42); Josh Lalor 1/18 (2 overs)

Melbourne Stars won by 8 wickets
Sydney Showground Stadium
Attendance: 14,469
Umpires: Rod Tucker and Damien Mealey
Player of the match: Kevin Pietersen (Stars)

- Melbourne Stars won the toss and elected to field

19 January
19:40 (D/N)
Scorecard

Adelaide Strikers; 5/166 (20 overs)	v	Melbourne Renegades (H); 7/144 (20 overs)
Travis Head 71 (34); Nathan Rimmington 2/40 (3 overs)		Ben Stokes 33 (19); Ben Laughlin 2/24 (3 overs)

Adelaide Strikers won by 22 runs
Etihad Stadium, Melbourne
Attendance: 16,481
Umpires: Gerard Abood and Greg Davidson
Player of the match: Travis Head (Strikers)

- Adelaide Strikers won the toss and elected to bat
- Kelvin Smith (Strikers) made his Twenty20 debut

21 January
19:40 (D/N)
Scorecard

Perth Scorchers; 2/179 (20 overs)	v	Melbourne Stars (H); 7/182 (19.3 overs)
Shaun Marsh 79 (51); Michael Beer 1/38 (4 overs)		Peter Handscomb 103* (64); Yasir Arafat 4/27 (4 overs)

Melbourne Stars won by 3 wickets
Melbourne Cricket Ground
Attendance: 33,778
Umpires: Greg Davidson and Shawn Craig
Player of the match: Peter Handscomb (Stars)

- Perth Scorchers won the toss and elected to bat
- Melbourne Stars recorded the largest run chase in the BBL at the MCG

22 January
19:40 (D/N)
Scorecard

Sydney Thunder; 4/154 (20 overs)	v	Sydney Sixers (H); 6/155 (20 overs)
Jacques Kallis 56 (43); Nathan Lyon 3/19 (4 overs)		Jordan Silk 69* (43); Josh Lalor 4/29 (4 overs)

Sydney Sixers won by 4 wickets
Sydney Cricket Ground
Attendance: 36,487
Umpires: Geoff Joshua and Ashley Barrow
Player of the match: Jordan Silk (Sixers)

- Sydney Sixers won the toss and elected to field
- The crowd of 36,487 was the highest in NSW domestic cricket history beating the previous record (32,823) set earlier in the season between the same teams.
- Jake Doran and Chris Green (both Thunder) made their Twenty20 debuts

== Play-offs ==
Semifinals
4	Sydney Sixers	4/181 (20 ov)
1	Adelaide Strikers (H)	94 (14.3 ov)
2	Perth Scorchers (H)	7/144 (20 ov)
3	Melbourne Stars	126 (19.5 ov)

Final
4	Sydney Sixers	5/147 (20 ov)
2	Perth Scorchers	6/148 (20 ov)

=== Semi-final 1 ===
The top four teams from the group stage qualified for the semi-finals.

Semi-final 1
24 January
18:40 (D/N)
Scorecard

Sydney Sixers; 4/181 (20 overs)	v	Adelaide Strikers (H); 94 (14.3 overs)
Nic Maddinson 85 (48); Shaun Tait 1/30 (4 overs)		Ben Laughlin 22 (10); Doug Bollinger 3/21 (3 overs)

Sydney Sixers won by 87 runs
Adelaide Oval
Attendance: 52,633
Umpires: Gerard Abood and Mick Martell
Player of the match: Nic Maddinson (Sixers)

- Sydney Sixers won the toss and elected to bat
- The crowd of 52,633 was the then highest for any sport at the re-developed Adelaide Oval. It was also the then highest ever Australian domestic cricket crowd.

=== Semi-final 2 ===
Semi-final 2
25 January
16:10 (D/N)
Scorecard

(H) Perth Scorchers; 7/144 (20 overs)	v	Melbourne Stars; 126 (19.5 overs)
Michael Carberry 50 (36); John Hastings 3/27 (4 overs)		Luke Wright 31 (25); Andrew Tye 4/18 (4 overs)

Perth Scorchers won by 18 runs
WACA Ground, Perth
Attendance: 19,289
Umpires: Sam Nojagski and Geoff Joshua
Player of the match: Andrew Tye (Scorchers)

- Perth Scorchers won the toss and elected to bat

=== Final ===
The winners of the 2 semi-finals qualified for the finals.

Final
28 January
19:40 (D/N)
Scorecard

Sydney Sixers; 5/147 (20 overs)	v	Perth Scorchers; 6/148 (20 overs)
Moises Henriques 77 (57); Jason Behrendorff 1/19 (4 overs)		Shaun Marsh 73 (59); Brett Lee 3/25 (4 overs)

Perth Scorchers won by 4 wickets
Manuka Oval, Canberra
Attendance: 11,837
Umpires: Mick Martell and Paul Wilson
Player of the match: Shaun Marsh (Scorchers)

- Sydney Sixers won the toss and elected to bat

== Statistics ==
Most runs
Player	Team	Runs
Michael Klinger	Perth Scorchers	326
Kevin Pietersen	Melbourne Stars	293
Nic Maddinson	Sydney Sixers	284
Jordan Silk	Sydney Sixers	272
Michael Carberry	Perth Scorchers	266

Most wickets
Player	Team	Wickets
John Hastings	Melbourne Stars	16
Jason Behrendorff	Perth Scorchers	15
Yasir Arafat	Perth Scorchers	15
Andrew Tye	Perth Scorchers	14
Two players		13

- Source: BigBash
