= 2015–16 Big Bash League season =

Cricket tournament

2015–16 Big Bash League
- Dates: 17 December 2015 – 24 January 2016
- Administrator: Cricket Australia
- Cricket format: Twenty20
- Tournament format(s): Group stage and knockout
- Champions: Sydney Thunder (1st title)
- Participants: 8
- Matches: 35
- Attendance: 1,030,495 (29,443 per match)
- Player of the series: Chris Lynn (Brisbane Heat)
- Most runs: Chris Lynn (378), (Brisbane Heat)
- Most wickets: Clint McKay (18), (Sydney Thunder)
- Official website: bigbash.com.au

The 2015–16 Big Bash League season (BBL|05) was the fifth season of the Big Bash League (BBL), the top-class Twenty20 cricket competition in Australia. The tournament ran from 17 December 2015 to 24 January 2016.

The title was won by Sydney Thunder, who defeated Melbourne Stars by three wickets in the final to claim their first title. Perth Scorchers, who had been seeking a third successive title, lost to the Stars in the semi-final, failing to reach the final for the first time. Chris Lynn of the Brisbane Heat was the tournament's leading run-scorer, scoring 378 runs from eight matches, and was named player of the tournament. The leading wicket-taker was Clint McKay of Sydney Thunder, who took 18 wickets from ten matches. Travis Head of the Adelaide Strikers was named the best player under 25, scoring 299 runs and taking six wickets.

== Pre-season ==
Warm up matches

5 December 2015
Details

| Canterbury Kings; 210/3 (20 overs) | v | Sydney Thunder; 201/6 (20 overs) |

Canterbury Kings won by 9 runs
Hagley Oval, Christchurch, New Zealand

13 December 2015

| Melbourne Renegades (H); 146/7 (20 overs) | v | Victorian Invitational XI; 97 |

Melbourne Renegades won by 49 runs
Merv Hughes Oval, Footscray

Festival of Cricket matches

11 December 2015
Scorecard

| Perth Scorchers; 231/8 (20 overs) | v | Legends XI; 189/6 (20 overs) |

Perth Scorchers won by 42 runs
Aquinas College, Perth
Attendance: 6,500

11 December 2015 (D/N)
Scorecard

| Melbourne Renegades; 144/8 (20 overs) | v | Melbourne Stars; 147/4 (17.3 overs) |

Melbourne Stars won by 6 wickets
Simonds Stadium, Geelong
Attendance: 10,023

== League stage ==
=== Points table ===
| Pos | Team | Pld | W | L | NR | Pts | NRR | Qualification |
|---|---|---|---|---|---|---|---|---|
| 1 | Adelaide Strikers | 8 | 7 | 1 | 0 | 14 | 0.544 | Advanced to semi-finals |
| 2 | Melbourne Stars | 8 | 5 | 3 | 0 | 10 | 0.366 | Advanced to semi-finals |
| 3 | Perth Scorchers | 8 | 5 | 3 | 0 | 10 | 0.181 | Advanced to semi-finals |
| 4 | Sydney Thunder (C) | 8 | 4 | 4 | 0 | 8 | 0.375 | Advanced to semi-finals |
| 5 | Melbourne Renegades | 8 | 3 | 5 | 0 | 6 | −0.041 | |
| 6 | Brisbane Heat | 8 | 3 | 5 | 0 | 6 | −0.204 | |
| 7 | Hobart Hurricanes | 8 | 3 | 5 | 0 | 6 | −0.955 | |
| 8 | Sydney Sixers | 8 | 2 | 6 | 0 | 4 | −0.330 | |

(C) Champions

=== Match summary ===
| Visitor team → | ADS | BRH | HBH | MLR | MLS | PRS | SYS | SYT |
| Home team ↓ | ADS | BRH | HBH | MLR | MLS | PRS | SYS | SYT |
|---|---|---|---|---|---|---|---|---|
| Adelaide Strikers | | | Strikers; 6 wickets | | Strikers; 19 runs | Strikers; 36 runs | Strikers; 5 wickets | |
| Brisbane Heat | Strikers; 8 wickets | | Hurricanes; 15 runs | Renegades; 7 wickets | | | | Heat; 6 wickets |
| Hobart Hurricanes | | Hurricanes; 20 runs | | Renegades; 5 wickets | | Scorchers; 1 run | | Hurricanes; 11 runs |
| Melbourne Renegades | Strikers; 27 runs | | | | Stars; 8 wickets | Scorchers; 10 wickets | Sixers; 3 wickets | |
| Melbourne Stars | | Heat; 56 runs | Stars; 8 wickets | Stars; 7 wickets | | | | Thunder; 1 run |
| Perth Scorchers | Strikers; 4 wickets | Scorchers; 9 wickets | | | Stars; 52 runs | | Scorchers; 9 wickets | |
| Sydney Sixers | | Heat; 6 runs | Sixers; 95 runs | | Stars; 5 wickets | | | Thunder; 46 runs |
| Sydney Thunder | Thunder; 7 wickets | | | Renegades; 5 wickets | | Scorchers; 30 runs | Thunder; 36 runs | |

| Home team won | Visitor team won |

- Note: Results listed are according to the home (horizontal) and visitor (vertical) teams.
- Note: Click on a result to see a summary of the match.

=== Matches ===
17 December
19:40 (D/N)
Scorecard

| (H) Sydney Thunder; 4/158 (20 overs) | v | Sydney Sixers; 122 (19.5 overs) |
| Michael Hussey 80* (59); Trent Lawford 1/12 (2 overs) | | Michael Lumb 34 (27); Andre Russell 3/13 (4 overs) |

Sydney Thunder won by 36 runs
Spotless Stadium
Attendance: 18,287
Umpires: Geoff Joshua and Paul Wilson
Player of the match: Michael Hussey (Thunder)

- Sydney Thunder won the toss and elected to bat.

18 December
19:10 (D/N)
Scorecard

| (H) Adelaide Strikers; 5/187 (20 overs) | v | Melbourne Stars; 7/168 (20 overs) |
| Alex Ross 65 (31); Scott Boland 2/55 (4 overs) | | Marcus Stoinis 50 (42); Kane Richardson 3/23 (4 overs) |

Adelaide Strikers won by 19 runs
Adelaide Oval
Attendance: 27,611
Umpires: Gerard Abood and Michael Graham-Smith
Player of the match: Alex Ross (Strikers)

- Melbourne Stars won the toss and elected to field.

19 December
18:10 (D/N)
Scorecard

| (H) Brisbane Heat; 5/180 (20 overs) | v | Melbourne Renegades; 3/184 (19.3 overs) |
| Chris Lynn 35 (20); Xavier Doherty 2/29 (4 overs) | | Aaron Finch 65 (45); Andrew Fekete 2/44 (4 overs) |

Melbourne Renegades won by 7 wickets
The Gabba
Attendance: 26,245
Umpires: Ashley Barrow and Sam Nogajski
Player of the match: Aaron Finch (Renegades)

- Brisbane Heat won the toss and elected to bat.
- Guy Walker (Renegades) made his T20 debut.

20 December
16:20
Scorecard

| (H) Sydney Sixers; 7/186 (20 overs) | v | Hobart Hurricanes; 91 (15.5 overs) |
| Brad Haddin 72 (45); Cameron Boyce 2/25 (4 overs) | | George Bailey 62* (45); Nathan Lyon 5/23 (3.5 overs) |

Sydney Sixers won by 95 runs
Sydney Cricket Ground
Attendance: 20,072
Umpires: Simon Fry and Phillip Gillespie
Player of the match: Brad Haddin (Sixers)

- Sydney Sixers won the toss and elected to bat.
- Sam Rainbird (Hurricanes) made his T20 debut.
- Phillip Gillespie made his T20 debut as an umpire.

20 December
19:25 (D/N)
Scorecard

| Sydney Thunder; 6/178 (20 overs) | v | Melbourne Stars (H); 5/177 (20 overs) |
| Usman Khawaja 109* (70); Glenn Maxwell 2/28 (4 overs) | | Kevin Pietersen 76 (42); Andre Russell 2/28 (4 overs) |

Sydney Thunder won by 1 run
Melbourne Cricket Ground
Attendance: 18,809
Umpires: Shawn Craig and Paul Wilson
Player of the match: Usman Khawaja (Thunder)

- Melbourne Stars won the toss and elected to field.

21 December
16:10
Scorecard

| (H) Perth Scorchers; 6/151 (20 overs) | v | Adelaide Strikers; 6/152 (19.1 overs) |
| Shaun Marsh 47 (35); Ben Laughlin 2/20 (3 overs) | | Mahela Jayawardene 42 (40); David Willey 2/24 (4 overs) |

Adelaide Strikers won by 4 wickets
#TheFurnace
Attendance: 20,553
Umpires: Gerard Abood and Mick Martell
Player of the match: Adil Rashid (Strikers)

- Perth Scorchers won the toss and elected to bat.

22 December
19:10 (D/N)
Scorecard

| (H) Hobart Hurricanes; 3/184 (20 overs) | v | Brisbane Heat; 8/164 (20 overs) |
| Tim Paine 87* (58); Ben Cutting 1/32 (4 overs) | | Jason Floros 42 (23); Sam Rainbird 3/37 (4 overs) |

Hobart Hurricanes won by 20 runs
Blundstone Arena
Attendance: 14,848
Umpires: Greg Davidson and Michael Graham-Smith
Player of the match: Tim Paine (Hurricanes)

- Hobart Hurricanes won the toss and elected to bat.
- The crowd of 14,848 was the highest in Tasmanian domestic cricket history, beating the previous record of 14,744 set in the previous season between the same teams.

23 December
19:10 (D/N)
Scorecard

| (H) Melbourne Renegades; 4/172 (20 overs) | v | Sydney Sixers; 7/174 (18.5 overs) |
| Chris Gayle 46 (33); Johan Botha 1/13 (2 overs) | | Michael Lumb 63 (35); Nathan Rimmington 4/26 (4 overs) |

Sydney Sixers won by 3 wickets
Etihad Stadium
Attendance: 20,850
Umpires: Simon Fry and Sam Nogajski
Player of the match: Michael Lumb (Sixers)

- Sydney Sixers won the toss and elected to field.
- Cameron Stevenson (Renegades) made his T20 debut.

26 December
16:10
Scorecard

| Brisbane Heat; 7/117 (20 overs) | v | Perth Scorchers (H); 1/118 (15.1 overs) |
| Chris Lynn 75* (58); Andrew Tye 3/23 (4 overs) | | Michael Klinger 53* (42); Andrew Fekete 1/16 (2 overs) |

Perth Scorchers won by 9 wickets
#TheFurnace
Attendance: 19,225
Umpires: Shawn Craig and Michael Graham-Smith
Player of the match: David Willey (Scorchers)

- Brisbane Heat won the toss and elected to bat.

27 December
19:10 (D/N)
Scorecard

| (H) Sydney Sixers; 6/139 (20 overs) | v | Melbourne Stars; 5/143 (18.4 overs) |
| Moisés Henriques 41* (34); Ben Hilfenhaus 2/25 (3 overs) | | Peter Handscomb 52 (40); Doug Bollinger 2/31 (3.4 overs) |

Melbourne Stars won by 5 wickets
Sydney Cricket Ground
Attendance: 29,104
Umpires: Geoff Joshua and Sam Nogaski
Player of the match: Glenn Maxwell (Stars)

- Sydney Sixers won the toss and elected to bat.
- The crowd of 29,104 is the highest crowd at the SCG for a non-derby BBL match.

28 December
19:10 (D/N)
Scorecard

| Adelaide Strikers; 9/117 (20 overs) | v | Sydney Thunder (H); 3/121 (16.3 overs) |
| Brad Hodge 34 (33); Clint McKay 2/18 (3 overs) | | Jacques Kallis 49* (48); Ben Laughlin 2/22 (2.3 overs) |

Sydney Thunder won by 7 wickets
Spotless Stadium
Attendance: 21,500
Umpires: Gerard Abood and Greg Davidson
Player of the match: Andre Russell (Thunder)

- Adelaide Strikers won the toss and elected to bat.
- The crowd of 21,500 is the highest attendance for a cricket match at Spotless Stadium and the second highest attendance for any sport at the stadium.
- Billy Stanlake (Strikers) made his T20 debut.

29 December
18:10 (D/N)
Scorecard

| Hobart Hurricanes; 4/194 (20 overs) | v | Brisbane Heat (H); 9/179 (20 overs) |
| Daniel Christian 56* (24); Samuel Badree 2/27 (4 overs) | | Chris Lynn 101 (51); Jake Reed 3/31 (4 overs) |

Hobart Hurricanes won by 15 runs
The Gabba
Attendance: 29,876
Umpires: Ashley Barrow and Simon Fry
Player of the match: Chris Lynn (Heat)

- Hobart Hurricanes won the toss and elected to bat.
- Sam Heazlett (Heat) made his T20 debut.

30 December
19:10 (D/N)
Scorecard

| (H) Melbourne Renegades; 4/170 (20 overs) | v | Perth Scorchers; 0/171 (18.4 overs) |
| Aaron Finch 72 (48); Jason Behrendorff 2/14 (4 overs) | | Michael Klinger 90* (58) |

Perth Scorchers won by 10 wickets
Etihad Stadium
Attendance: 26,787
Umpires: Gerard Abood and Phillip Gillespie
Player of the match: Michael Klinger (Scorchers)

- Perth Scorchers won the toss and elected to field.
- This was the first ever 10-wicket win in a BBL match.
- The crowd of 26,787 is the highest crowd at Etihad Stadium for a non-derby BBL match.
- Michael Klinger and Shaun Marsh's unbeaten 171-run partnership is the highest partnership for the Scorchers in their history and the second highest overall.

31 December
18:40 (D/N)
Scorecard

| Sydney Sixers; 5/176 (20 overs) | v | Adelaide Strikers (H); 5/182 (19.3 overs) |
| Brad Haddin 54* (35); Adil Rashid 3/34 (4 overs) | | Travis Head 101* (53); Ben Dwarshuis 3/25 (4 overs) |

Adelaide Strikers won by 5 wickets
Adelaide Oval
Attendance: 46,389
Umpires: Simon Fry and Paul Wilson
Player of the match: Travis Head (Strikers)

- Adelaide Strikers won the toss and elected to field.
- Hamish Kingston (Strikers) made his T20 debut.

1 January
19:10 (D/N)
Scorecard

| (H) Hobart Hurricanes; 6/163 (20 overs) | v | Sydney Thunder; 9/152 (20 overs) |
| George Bailey 56* (29); Clint McKay 4/28 (3 overs) | | Michael Hussey 71 (51); Shaun Tait 3/16 (4 overs) |

Hobart Hurricanes won by 11 runs
Blundstone Arena
Attendance: 17,151
Umpires: Phillip Gillespie and Geoff Joshua
Player of the match: Shaun Tait (Hurricanes)

- Sydney Thunder won the toss and elected to field.
- The crowd of 17,151 was the highest crowd at Blundstone Arena for a cricket match and the second highest crowd for any sport at the stadium.

2 January
18:10 (D/N)
Scorecard

| Melbourne Renegades; 7/161 (20 overs) | v | Melbourne Stars (H); 3/163 (19.1 overs) |
| Cameron White 54 (39); John Hastings 4/29 (4 overs) | | Luke Wright 109* (63); Chris Tremain 1/22 (4 overs) |

Melbourne Stars won by 7 wickets
Melbourne Cricket Ground
Attendance: 80,883
Umpires: Shawn Craig and Sam Nogajski
Player of the match: Luke Wright (Stars)

- Melbourne Stars won the toss and elected to field.
- The crowd of 80,883 is the highest ever recorded attendance for a domestic cricket match.

2 January
18:15 (D/N)
Scorecard

| Sydney Sixers; 8/112 (20 overs) | v | Perth Scorchers (H); 1/114 (14.3 overs) |
| Michael Lumb 47 (45); David Willey 3/22 (4 overs) | | Shaun Marsh 63* (54); Sean Abbott 1/11 (1 over) |

Perth Scorchers won by 9 wickets
#TheFurnace
Attendance: 20,444
Umpires: Ashley Barrow and Paul Wilson
Player of the match: David Willey (Scorchers)

- Sydney Sixers won the toss and elected to bat.
- William Somerville (Sixers) made his T20 debut.

3 January
18:10 (D/N)
Scorecard

| Sydney Thunder; 5/186 (20 overs) | v | Brisbane Heat (H); 4/189 (19.3 overs) |
| Michael Hussey 56 (43); Samuel Badree 1/26 (4 overs) | | Chris Lynn 75 (32); Andre Russell 2/28 (4 overs) |

Brisbane Heat won by 6 wickets
The Gabba
Attendance: 27,507
Umpires: Simon Fry and Michael Graham-Smith
Player of the match: Chris Lynn (Heat)

- Brisbane Heat won the toss and elected to field.

4 January
19:40 (D/N)
Scorecard

| (H) Hobart Hurricanes; 5/140 (20 overs) | v | Melbourne Renegades; 5/144 (14 overs) |
| Daniel Christian 58 (40); Xavier Doherty 2/19 (3 overs) | | Aaron Finch 60 (39); Cameron Boyce 3/34 (4 overs) |

Melbourne Renegades won by 5 wickets
Blundstone Arena
Attendance: 16,412
Umpires: Sam Nogajski and Paul Wilson
Player of the match: Chris Tremain (Renegades)

- Melbourne Renegades won the toss and elected to field.

5 January
19:10 (D/N)
Scorecard

| (H) Adelaide Strikers; 2/174 (20 overs) | v | Perth Scorchers; 138 (17.3 overs) |
| Mahela Jayawardene 57 (37); Ashton Agar 1/12 (2 overs) | | David Willey 31 (17); Adil Rashid 3/23 (4 overs) |

Adelaide Strikers won by 36 runs
Adelaide Oval
Attendance: 46,633
Umpires: Shawn Craig and Greg Davidson
Player of the match: Travis Head (Strikers)

- Adelaide Strikers won the toss and elected to bat.
- Jake Lehmann (Strikers) made his T20 debut.

6 January
19:40 (D/N)
Scorecard

| Hobart Hurricanes; 124 (20 overs) | v | Melbourne Stars (H); 2/126 (15 overs) |
| George Bailey 55 (40); Adam Zampa 2/18 (4 overs) | | Glenn Maxwell 56* (32); Sam Rainbird 1/25 (4 overs) |

Melbourne Stars won by 8 wickets
Melbourne Cricket Ground
Attendance: 33,603
Umpires: Geoff Joshua and Sam Nogajski
Player of the match: Glenn Maxwell (Stars)

- Melbourne Stars won the toss and elected to field.

7 January
19:40 (D/N)
Scorecard

| Perth Scorchers; 5/175 (20 overs) | v | Sydney Thunder (H); 9/145 (20 overs) |
| Cameron Bancroft 72 (53); Andre Russell 2/31 (4 overs) | | Andre Russell 42 (20); Andrew Tye 3/22 (4 overs) |

Perth Scorchers won by 30 runs
Spotless Stadium
Attendance: 18,942
Umpires: Greg Davidson and Paul Wilson
Player of the match: Cameron Bancroft (Scorchers)

- Sydney Thunder won the toss and elected to field.

8 January
18:40 (D/N)
Scorecard

| (H) Brisbane Heat; 6/175 (20 overs) | v | Adelaide Strikers; 2/179 (18.4 overs) |
| Jimmy Peirson 51 (36); Adil Rashid 2/17 (4 overs) | | Tim Ludeman 57* (49); Samuel Badree 1/25 (4 overs) |

Adelaide Strikers won by 8 wickets
The Gabba
Attendance: 33,783
Umpires: Ashley Barrow and Phillip Gillespie
Player of the match: Mahela Jayawardene (Strikers)

- Adelaide Strikers won the toss and elected to field.
- The crowd of 33,783 is the highest crowd at the Gabba for a BBL match.

9 January
19:10 (D/N)
Scorecard

| (H) Melbourne Renegades; 6/155 (20 overs) | v | Melbourne Stars; 2/156 (18 overs) |
| Dwayne Bravo 59* (37); Marcus Stoinis 3/11 (2 overs) | | Kevin Pietersen 67* (43); Cameron Stevenson 1/28 (3 overs) |

Melbourne Stars won by 8 wickets
Etihad Stadium
Attendance: 43,176
Umpires: Geoff Joshua and Mick Martell
Player of the match: Marcus Stoinis (Stars)

- Melbourne Stars won the toss and elected to field.
- Aaron Ayre (Renegades) made his T20 debut.
- The crowd of 43,176 is the highest at Etihad Stadium for a cricket match.

10 January
16:20
Scorecard

| Perth Scorchers; 5/173 (20 overs) | v | Hobart Hurricanes (H); 6/172 (20 overs) |
| Michael Carberry 62 (35); Shaun Tait 2/29 (4 overs) | | Tim Paine 57 (47); Ashton Agar 2/38 (4 overs) |

Perth Scorchers won by 1 run
Blundstone Arena
Attendance: 18,149
Umpires: Ashley Barrow and Paul Wilson
Player of the match: Michael Carberry (Scorchers)

- Perth Scorchers won the toss and elected to bat.
- The crowd of 18,149 is the highest ever crowd for any sport at Blundstone Arena.

10 January
19:25 (D/N)
Scorecard

| Brisbane Heat; 8/162 (20 overs) | v | Sydney Sixers (H); 8/156 (20 overs) |
| Joe Burns 60 (51); Sean Abbott 3/8 (2 overs) | | Michael Lumb 47 (38); Mitchell Swepson 2/26 (3 overs) |

Brisbane Heat won by 6 runs
Sydney Cricket Ground
Attendance: 24,192
Umpires: Phillip Gillespie and Michael Graham-Smith
Player of the match: Joe Burns (Heat)

- Brisbane Heat won the toss and elected to bat.
- Nick Larkin (Sixers) and Mitchell Swepson (Heat) both made their T20 debuts.

11 January
19:40 (D/N)
Scorecard

| (H) Sydney Thunder; 5/173 (20 overs) | v | Melbourne Renegades; 5/176 (19.2 overs) |
| Usman Khawaja 62 (42); Dwayne Bravo 2/26 (4 overs) | | Cameron White 61 (46); Andre Russell 2/42 (4 overs) |

Melbourne Renegades won by 5 wickets
Spotless Stadium
Attendance: 18,602
Umpires: Gerard Abood and Shawn Craig
Player of the match: Cameron White (Renegades)

- Sydney Thunder won the toss and elected to bat.

13 January
19:10 (D/N)
Scorecard

| Hobart Hurricanes; 143 (19.3 overs) | v | Adelaide Strikers (H); 4/146 (20 overs) |
| Tim Paine 45 (39); Michael Neser 3/26 (3.3 overs) | | Tim Ludeman 57* (58); Simon Milenko 3/25 (4 overs) |

Adelaide Strikers won by 6 wickets
Adelaide Oval
Attendance: 49,115
Umpires: Shawn Craig and Paul Wilson
Player of the match: Adil Rashid (Strikers)

- Hobart Hurricanes won the toss and elected to bat.
- Greg West (Strikers) made his T20 debut.
- The crowd of 49,115 is the highest at Adelaide Oval for a non-finals BBL match.

14 January
19:40 (D/N)
Scorecard

| Brisbane Heat; 7/188 (20 overs) | v | Melbourne Stars (H); 9/132 (20 overs) |
| Chris Lynn 56 (24); Adam Zampa 2/31 (4 overs) | | Evan Gulbis 61* (52); Samuel Badree 5/22 (4 overs) |

Brisbane Heat won by 56 runs
Melbourne Cricket Ground
Attendance: 30,649
Umpires: Greg Davidson and Sam Nogajski
Player of the match: Samuel Badree (Heat)

- Melbourne Stars won the toss and elected to field.

16 January
18:10 (D/N)
Scorecard

| Sydney Thunder; 5/202 (20 overs) | v | Sydney Sixers (H); 156 (17.3 overs) |
| Shane Watson 66 (41); Sean Abbott 2/41 (4 overs) | | Nic Maddinson 70 (40); Clint McKay 3/16 (2.3 overs) |

Sydney Thunder won by 46 runs
Sydney Cricket Ground
Attendance: 38,456
Umpires: Gerard Abood and John Ward
Player of the match: Shane Watson (Thunder)

- Sydney Sixers won the toss and elected to field.
- Nathan McAndrew (Thunder) made his T20 debut.
- The crowd of 38,456 is the highest crowd for a domestic cricket game in New South Wales.

16 January
18:15 (D/N)
Scorecard

| Melbourne Stars; 9/146 (20 overs) | v | Perth Scorchers (H); 94 (19 overs) |
| David Hussey 36 (25); Matt Dixon 3/32 (4 overs) | | Adam Voges 46* (51); Daniel Worrall 3/15 (4 overs) |

Melbourne Stars won by 52 runs
#TheFurnace
Attendance: 20,870
Umpires: Phillip Gillespie and Geoff Joshua
Player of the match: Ben Hilfenhaus (Stars)

- Perth Scorchers won the toss and elected to field.
- Jhye Richardson (Scorchers) made his T20 debut.
- The crowd of 20,870 is the highest crowd for a BBL match at this ground.

18 January
19:40 (D/N)
Scorecard

| Adelaide Strikers; 5/170 (20 overs) | v | Melbourne Renegades (H); 143 (15.3 overs) |
| Tim Ludeman 49 (41); Xavier Doherty 2/30 (4 overs) | | Chris Gayle 56 (17); Travis Head 3/16 (2 overs) |

Adelaide Strikers won by 27 runs
Etihad Stadium
Attendance: 25,227
Umpires: Gerard Abood and Shawn Craig
Player of the match: Travis Head (Strikers)

- Melbourne Renegades won the toss and elected to field.
- Chris Gayle (Renegades) equaled the world record for the fastest fifty in a T20 match (12 balls, set by Yuvraj Singh during India vs. England in the 2007 World Twenty20)

== Play-offs ==
Semifinals
1 | Adelaide Strikers (H) | 7/159 (20 ov)
4 | Sydney Thunder | 2/160 (17.4 ov)
3 | Perth Scorchers | 7/139 (20 ov)
2 | Melbourne Stars (H) | 3/140 (18.1 ov)

Final
2 | Melbourne Stars (H) | 9/176 (20 ov)
4 | Sydney Thunder | 7/181 (19.3 ov)

=== Semi-final 1 ===
Semi-final 1
21 January
19:10 (D/N)
Scorecard

| (H) Adelaide Strikers; 7/159 (20 overs) | v | Sydney Thunder; 2/160 (17.4 overs) |
| Alex Ross 47 (38); Clint McKay 3/44 (4 overs) | | Usman Khawaja 104* (59); Ben Laughlin 1/21 (3 overs) |

Sydney Thunder won by 8 wickets
Adelaide Oval
Attendance: 48,699
Umpires: Gerard Abood and Simon Fry
Player of the match: Usman Khawaja (Thunder)

- Adelaide Strikers won the toss and elected to bat.

=== Semi-final 2 ===
Semi-final 2
22 January
19:40 (D/N)
Scorecard

| Perth Scorchers; 7/139 (20 overs) | v | Melbourne Stars (H); 3/140 (18.1 overs) |
| Adam Voges 52 (40); Daniel Worrall 3/25 (4 overs) | | Kevin Pietersen 62 (36); Brad Hogg 1/20 (4 overs) |

Melbourne Stars won by 7 wickets
Melbourne Cricket Ground
Attendance: 30,174
Umpires: Geoff Joshua and Sam Nogajski
Player of the match: Kevin Pietersen (Stars)

- Melbourne Stars won the toss and elected to field.

=== Final ===
Final
24 January
19:20 (D/N)
Scorecard

| (H) Melbourne Stars; 9/176 (20 overs) | v | Sydney Thunder; 7/181 (19.3 overs) |
| Kevin Pietersen 74 (39); Shane Watson 2/17 (3 overs) | | Usman Khawaja 70 (40); Marcus Stoinis 3/30 (4 overs) |

Sydney Thunder won by 3 wickets
Melbourne Cricket Ground
Attendance: 47,672
Umpires: Simon Fry and Sam Nogajski
Player of the match: Usman Khawaja (Thunder)

- Sydney Thunder won the toss and elected to field.
- The crowd of 47,672 was the highest crowd for a non-derby BBL match at the MCG, and remained the highest crowd for a Big Bash League final until the 2022–23 BBL final.

== Statistics ==
Most runs
| Player | Team | Runs |
|---|---|---|
| Chris Lynn | Brisbane Heat | 378 |
| Usman Khawaja | Sydney Thunder | 345 |
| Kevin Pietersen | Melbourne Stars | 323 |
| Michael Hussey | Sydney Thunder | 306 |
| Travis Head | Adelaide Strikers | 299 |

- Source: ESPNcricinfo

Most wickets
| Player | Team | Wickets |
|---|---|---|
| Clint McKay | Sydney Thunder | 18 |
| Adil Rashid | Adelaide Strikers | 16 |
| Andre Russell | Sydney Thunder | 16 |
| Andrew Tye | Perth Scorchers | 13 |
| Two players | | 12 |

- Source: ESPNcricinfo

== Notable events ==
The opening Sydney Derby match was played for the "Batting for Change Trophy" at Spotless Stadium. During the match money was raised for the Batting for Change charity after every six which was hit.

The January 2 match between Perth Scorchers and Sydney Sixers at the WACA Ground saw the clubs wearing Batman and Superman playing gear as a part of a league partnership with Warner Bros. Pictures.

== TV audience ==
Matches were broadcast in Australia by the free-to-air Network Ten. Network Ten's BBL coverage has become a regular feature of Australian summers and attracted an average audience of 1.13 million for each match in Australia this season, an 18% increase on the previous season. A cumulative audience of 9.65 million watched the BBL matches in Australia, out of which 39% were females.

The opening Sydney Derby match attracted more a peak audience of 1.53 million. A peak audience of 1.05 million watched the second innings of the match in the five major capital cities, making it then the highest-rating non-finals match in BBL history. This record was broken in the last match between Renegades and Strikers when Session 2 was watched by an average audience of 1.36 million, which peaked at 1.67 million.

The BBL Final was watched by an average audience of 1.79 million, which peaked at 2.24 million viewers. This was the first time that the ratings for a BBL match crossed the 2 million mark.

Following are the television ratings for 2015–16 BBL season in Australia.

| Match No | Teams | Average TV Ratings | | | |
| Match No | Teams | National | | 5 metro cities | |
| Match No | Teams | Session 1 | Session 2 | Session 1 | Session 2 |
|---|---|---|---|---|---|
| 1 | Sydney Thunder vs Sydney Sixers | 1,220,000 | 1,250,000 | 856,000 | 917,000 |
| 2 | Adelaide Strikers vs Melbourne Stars | 999,000 | 1,270,000 | 720,000 | 941,000 |
| 3 | Brisbane Heat vs Melbourne Renegades | 843,000 | 1,100,000 | 642,000 | 853,000 |
| 4 | Sydney Sixers vs Hobart Hurricanes | 693,000 | 827,000 | 488,000 | 590,000 |
| 5 | Melbourne Stars vs Sydney Thunder | 1,170,000 | 1,250,000 | 817,000 | 914,000 |
| 6 | Perth Scorchers vs Adelaide Strikers | 898,000 | 1,200,000 | 664,000 | 919,000 |
| 7 | Hobart Hurricanes vs Brisbane Heat | 843,000 | 1,170,000 | 597,000 | 831,000 |
| 8 | Melbourne Renegades vs Sydney Sixers | 864,000 | 1,160,000 | 603,000 | 847,000 |
| 9 | Perth Scorchers vs Brisbane Heat | 708,000 | 857,000 | 511,000 | 614,000 |
| 10 | Sydney Sixers vs Melbourne Stars | 686,000 | 952,000 | 479,000 | 675,000 |
| 11 | Sydney Thunder vs Adelaide Strikers | 797,000 | 1,030,000 | 575,000 | 758,000 |
| 12 | Brisbane Heat vs Hobart Hurricanes | 855,000 | 1,130,000 | 608,000 | 790,000 |
| 13 | Melbourne Renegades vs Perth Scorchers | 917,000 | 1,170,000 | 677,000 | 864,000 |
| 14 | Adelaide Strikers vs Sydney Sixers | 729,000 | 887,000 | 517,000 | 629,000 |
| 15 | Hobart Hurricanes vs Sydney Thunder | 902,000 | 1,160,000 | 665,000 | 831,000 |
| 16 | Melbourne Stars vs Melbourne Renegades | 852,000 | 1,260,000 | 621,000 | 880,000 |
| 17 | Perth Scorchers vs Sydney Sixers | 753,000 | 1,060,000 | 577,000 | 759,000 |
| 18 | Brisbane Heat vs Sydney Thunder | 968,000 | 1,250,000 | 676,000 | 913,000 |
| 19 | Hobart Hurricanes vs Melbourne Renegades | 1,160,000 | 1,250,000 | 857,000 | 983,000 |
| 20 | Adelaide Strikers vs Perth Scorchers | 1,210,000 | 1,270,000 | 878,000 | 983,000 |
| 21 | Melbourne Stars vs Hobart Hurricanes | 1,120,000 | 1,180,000 | 846,000 | 913,000 |
| 22 | Sydney Thunder vs Perth Scorchers | 1,123,000 | 1,090,000 | 781,000 | 930,000 |
| 23 | Brisbane Heat vs Adelaide Strikers | 1,180,000 | 1,040,000 | 765,000 | 887,000 |
| 24 | Melbourne Renegades vs Melbourne Stars | 841,000 | 1,070,000 | 599,000 | 777,000 |
| 25 | Hobart Hurricanes vs Perth Scorchers | 653,000 | 848,000 | 465,000 | 636,000 |
| 26 | Sydney Sixers vs Brisbane Heat | 1,080,000 | 1,180,000 | 803,000 | 859,000 |
| 27 | Sydney Thunder vs Melbourne Renegades | 1,210,000 | 1,240,000 | 868,000 | 904,000 |
| 28 | Adelaide Strikers vs Hobart Hurricanes | 1,040,000 | 1,190,000 | 788,000 | 897,000 |
| 29 | Melbourne Stars vs Brisbane Heat | 1,200,000 | 1,230,000 | 868,000 | 910,000 |
| 30 | Sydney Sixers vs Sydney Thunder | 777,000 | 1,120,000 | 536,000 | 790,000 |
| 31 | Perth Scorchers vs Melbourne Stars | 1,020,000 | 667,000 | 769,000 | 540,000 |
| 32 | Melbourne Renegades vs Adelaide Strikers | 1,110,000 | 1,360,000 | 820,000 | 1,020,000 |
| SF1 | Adelaide Strikers vs Sydney Thunder | 1,070,000 | 1,220,000 | 806,000 | 929,000 |
| SF2 | Melbourne Stars vs Perth Scorchers | 1,050,000 | 1,180,000 | 774,000 | 900,000 |
| Final | Melbourne Stars vs Sydney Thunder | 1,570,000 | 1,790,000 | 1,130,000 | 1,300,000 |
| Average | | 1,057,414 | | 776,129 | |
