= Craig Simmons =

Australian former professional cricketer (born 1982)

Personal information
- Full name: Craig Joseph Simmons
- Born: 1 December 1982 (age 43); Paddington, New South Wales, Australia
- Nickname: Simmo
- Height: 1.70 m (5 ft 7 in)
- Batting: Left-handed
- Bowling: Slow left arm orthodox
- Role: Batsman

Domestic team information
- Years: Team
- 2003/04–2004/05: Western Australia
- 2005/06–2006/07: New South Wales
- 2008/09–2014/15: Western Australia
- 2013/14–2014/15: Perth Scorchers
- 2014/15–2015/16: Adelaide Strikers

Career statistics
Competition	FC	LA	T20
Matches	7	21	29
Runs scored	187	501	711
Batting average	15.58	23.85	25.39
100s/50s	0/1	0/3	2/0
Top score	60	98	112
Balls bowled	120	–	84
Wickets	1	–	3
Bowling average	72.00	–	29.33
5 wickets in innings	0	–	0
10 wickets in match	0	–	0
Best bowling	1/37	–	2/26
Catches/stumpings	3/–	4/–	5/–
- Source: CricketArchive, 19 May 2019

Craig Joseph Simmons (born 1 December 1982) is an Australian former professional cricketer. He played domestically for Western Australia, New South Wales, Perth Scorchers and Adelaide Strikers. At grade cricket level, he plays for Rockingham-Mandurah in the WACA district competition, having previously played for Fremantle in WACA district matches and Gordon in Sydney Grade Cricket matches. A left-handed batsman, Simmons represented the Australian national under-19 team at the 2002 Under-19 World Cup, playing seven matches. At the tournament, he scored 155 runs from 115 balls against Kenya's under-19 team, contributing to Australia's total of 6/480 from 50 overs and eventual win by 430 runs.

Simmons made his first-class debut for Western Australia in December 2003, against Victoria at the WACA Ground in Perth. He transferred to New South Wales for the 2005–06 season, and regularly played ING Cup matches, as well as top-scoring for New South Wales in the final of the inaugural KFC Twenty20 Big Bash season, which the team lost to Victoria. Playing only twice at state level the following season, Simmons' Cricket NSW contract was not renewed for the 2007–08 season, and he subsequently returned to Western Australia, breaking into the team for a small number of games during the 2008–09 and 2011–12 seasons.

After good form for Rockingham-Mandurah at district level, Simmons replaced the injured Liam Davis in the Perth Scorchers' squad for the 2013–14 Big Bash League season. In his fourth game for the Scorchers, against the Adelaide Strikers in mid-January 2014, Simmons scored a century from 39 balls, breaking the record for the fastest Big Bash League century; a record that would not be matched until 11 years later when Mitchell Owen of the Hobart Hurricanes tied it during the 2024-25 final. He was dismissed shortly after, finishing with 102 runs from 41 balls, with his innings including eight fours and eight sixes. In the team's semi-final against the Sydney Sixers, Simmons scored another century, 112 runs from 58 balls. He thus became the first player to score two centuries in Big Bash League matches, and also equalled Chris Gayle's competition record of eleven sixes in a match. As of that match, he has a strike rate of 176.51 runs per 100 balls, the best of any player who has faced over 125 balls in the competition. He subsequently signed for the Adelaide Strikers for the 2014–15 and the 2015–16 BBL seasons.
