= Aaron Ayre =

Australian cricketer (born 1992)

Personal information
- Born: 6 August 1992 (age 34); Canberra, Australia

Domestic team information
- Years: Team
- 2015-present: Victoria (squad no. 4)
- 2016: Melbourne Renegades

Career statistics
Competition	FC	T20
Matches	2	1
Runs scored	90	0
Batting average	22.50	0.00
100s/50s	0/0	0/0
Top score	36	-
Balls bowled	-	-
Wickets	-	-
Bowling average	-	-
5 wickets in innings	-	-
10 wickets in match	-	-
Best bowling	-	-
Catches/stumpings	3/1	0/0
- Source: Cricinfo, 3 November 2019

Aaron Ayre (born 6 August 1992) is an Australian cricketer who plays as a wicket-keeper. He made his first-class debut for Victoria on 14 November 2015 in the 2015–16 Sheffield Shield. On 9 January 2016 he made his Twenty20 debut for the Melbourne Renegades in the 2015–16 Big Bash League.
