= Alex Ross (cricketer) =

Australian cricketer (born 1992)

Personal information
- Full name: Alexander Ian Ross
- Born: 17 April 1992 (age 34); Melbourne, Victoria, Australia
- Nickname: Sweepologist
- Batting: Right-handed
- Bowling: Right-arm offbreak
- Role: Middle-order batsman

Domestic team information
- Years: Team
- 2012–2019: South Australia
- 2014–2016: Adelaide Strikers
- 2016–2019: Brisbane Heat
- 2016: Jamaica Tallawahs
- 2019–2024: Sydney Thunder
- 2023–2024: Durdanto Dhaka
- 2024–: Adelaide Strikers
- 2024: Jaffna Kings
- 2025: Khulna Tigers
- First-class debut: 7 February 2015 South Australia v Western Australia
- List A debut: 14 October 2012 South Australia v Tasmania

Career statistics
Competition	FC	LA	T20
Matches	18	51	144
Runs scored	868	1,103	2,819
Batting average	28.00	29.02	28.19
100s/50s	0/6	1/6	0/14
Top score	92*	110	89*
Catches/stumpings	22/–	22/–	55/–
- Source: Cricinfo, 20 December 2024

Alexander Ian Ross (born 17 April 1992) is an Australian cricketer. The son of a cricket coach, Ross started playing domestic cricket for South Australia in 2012, having moved to the state in 2009 with his father. He began to rise to prominence in the 2014–15 season when, after improved form in both first-class and List A cricket, he began playing for the Adelaide Strikers in the Big Bash League. In his first match of BBL|05 he scored 65 runs off 31 balls, making excellent use of the sweep shot and earning the moniker "sweepologist". He represented South Australia in first-class and one-day cricket and currently plays for the Adelaide Strikers in the Big Bash League.

== Early life ==
Ross was born in Melbourne, Victoria, but he spent most of his early life in Christchurch, New Zealand where his father, Ashley Ross, worked as a cricket coach, at one stage being the assistant coach of the New Zealand national cricket team. While living in Christchurch he played hockey rather than cricket. Ross moved back to Australia in 2009 when his father got a job as a cricket coach in Adelaide, South Australia, where he attended St Peter's College. Ross began his cricketing career playing grade cricket for Kensington Cricket Club, though he had also spent twelve months in Canberra in the Australian Capital Territory, where he played for the ACT Comets' under-17s team. Ross won the Talbot Smith Fielding Trophy in the 2011–12 grade cricket season as the most outstanding fielder in South Australian grade cricket, and at the end of the season he was given a rookie contract with South Australia's state team.

== Domestic career ==
=== Early career (2012–2015) ===
Ross made his List A debut for South Australia in the 2012–13 Ryobi One-Day Cup against Tasmania and scored his maiden half-century against Western Australia in his fourth match. It wasn't until two years later in the 2014–15 season that he played in any other major formats of the game, having played twelve one-day matches in the 2012–13 and 2013–14 seasons. He started the season playing for the Eastern Edge in the SACA Premier League and scored a match-winning 164 runs off 141 balls for the team, hitting nine sixes in the process. After scoring runs in the 2014–15 Matador BBQs One-Day Cup Ross was signed by Big Bash League (BBL) team the Adelaide Strikers and made his Twenty20 debut for the side in their first match of BBL|04. After the BBL he made his first-class debut, playing for South Australia in a Sheffield Shield match against Western Australia. His improvement was rewarded when he was elevated to a senior contract with South Australia.

=== Breakthrough season ===
Ross had a breakout season in 2015–16, in which national selector Mark Waugh called him "the most improved player in Australia". Despite coming close on three occasions early in the season, he was unable to score his maiden domestic century. Two of these performances came in the 2015–16 Matador BBQs One-Day Cup, when he scored a match-winning 88 not out in a thrilling one-wicket victory over Queensland and 97 not out in the elimination final against Victoria, which took South Australia into the final of the competition. He finished the tournament with the highest batting average for the Redbacks, 59.25, and 237 runs in total. His improved form continued in the Sheffield Shield season, during which he scored 642 runs, second only to captain Travis Head for South Australia.

T20 career (2015–present)

Ross gained notoriety in BBL|05 in the Strikers' first match of the season. In a man-of-the-match performance against the Melbourne Stars he scored 65 runs off 31 balls to lead the Strikers to victory. During the innings he made great use of the sweep shot, and he was given the nickname "the sweepologist" by former Australian bowler Damien Fleming. Ross credited his successes with the sweep shot to his hockey background. At the end of the BBL season he changed clubs, signing a contract with the Brisbane Heat. Ross won the 2016 Bradman Young Cricketer of the Year Award with 31.86% of the votes and he finished the season playing for South Australia in the Sheffield Shield final. Though South Australia were unable to win the match, Ross scored an impressive pair of half-centuries with 72 and 71 in his two innings.

Ross signed with the Jamaica Tallawahs in the 2016 Caribbean Premier League, but he was only given three opportunities with the club in the last few matches before the finals, scoring 46 runs at a strike-rate of 95.45. After this he joined the Australia A squad in Queensland. His 2016–17 was not as successful as the previous season as he injured his hand during South Australia's opening Matador Cup match and missed out on the rest of the tournament and the first half of the Sheffield Shield season. He returned to cricket in BBL|06 with the Heat and return to South Australia's Sheffield Shield side for the second half of the season. He was awarded the Bradman Young Cricketer of the Year at the Allan Border Medal ceremony by Cricket Australia in 2016.

In October 2017, in the 2017–18 JLT One-Day Cup, Ross set a new record for the most runs scored in one over by an Australian in List A cricket, with 32. Overall he scored 224 runs for the tournament at an average of 32.00.

In January 2018, Ross was involved in a controversial moment in a BBL match, when he became the first player in BBL history to be dismissed for obstruction. Returning for a second run, Ross deviated from his original line of running and slid on an awkward angle, causing the ball to his bat and go onto the stumps. In the process of a run out appeal, the Hobart Hurricanes requested the umpires check the incident for possible obstruction. After deliberation, the third umpire ruled that Ross had intentionally deviated from his line to obstruct wicket keeper Matthew Wade from taking the ball. The incident caused national debate, with Heat captain Brendon McCullum stating on the broadcast of the game he was willing to be fined in order to express his view that Ross should not have been given out.
