= Ahillen Beadle =

Bahraini-Australian cricketer (b. 1986)

Personal information
- Full name: Ahillen Rajakumaran Beadle
- Born: 29 August 1986 (age 40); Bahrain
- Batting: Left-handed
- Bowling: Slow left-arm orthodox
- Role: All-rounder

Domestic team information
- Years: Team
- 2015: Sydney Thunder (squad no. 29)

Career statistics
Competition	T20
Matches	3
Runs scored	7
Batting average	7.00
100s/50s	0/0
Top score	7
Balls bowled	48
Wickets	1
Bowling average	61.00
5 wickets in innings	0
10 wickets in match	0
Best bowling	1/39
Catches/stumpings	0/-
- Source: ESPNcricinfo, 31 October 2017

Ahillen Rajakumaran Beadle is a Bahraini-born Australian cricketer of Sri Lankan descent who has represented Australia and the Sydney Thunder. He made his debut for the Sydney Thunder in the 2014–15 season and was a member of the Thunder's championship-winning squad in the 2015/16 season. He has also represented Australia at the Under-19 level in cricket.

He only has one kidney, due to an injury sustained while playing grade cricket. This cost him years of his career.
