= Nick Winter (cricketer) =

Australian cricketer (born 1993)

Nicholas Winter
Personal information
- Full name: Nicholas Philip Winter
- Born: 19 June 1993 (age 33); Canberra, Australian Capital Territory
- Batting: Left-handed
- Bowling: Left-arm medium-fast
- Role: Bowler

Domestic team information
- Years: Team
- 2014/15–2021/22: South Australia
- 2014/15: Melbourne Renegades
- 2016/17: Northern Districts
- 2020/21: Hobart Hurricanes
- FC debut: 8 February 2018 South Australia v Victoria
- LA debut: 6 October 2014 South Australia v Victoria

Career statistics
Competition	FC	LA	T20
Matches	22	8	7
Runs scored	431	12	0
Batting average	15.39	12.00	0.00
100s/50s	0/1	0/0	0/0
Top score	53*	7*	0
Balls bowled	5,094	372	116
Wickets	78	6	7
Bowling average	30.85	78.50	20.85
5 wickets in innings	4	0	0
10 wickets in match	1	0	0
Best bowling	5/48	2/94	3/19
Catches/stumpings	3/–	0/–	1/–
- Source: Cricinfo, 4 October 2024

Nicholas Winter (born 19 June 1993) is an Australian cricketer who played for South Australia.

== Career ==
=== Move to South Australia and injury (2013–2016) ===
Winter originally came from Canberra in the Australian Capital Territory, playing for the territory's representative team the ACT Comets before he was brought to South Australia for the 2013–14 season. Winter spent the season playing for South Australia in the Futures League, Australia's second XI competition, in which he was named the player of the year. He was rewarded with a rookie contract with SACA for the 2014–15 season. Winter made his List A debut in the 2014–15 Matador BBQs One-Day Cup for South Australia on 6 October 2014, against Victoria, bowling seven overs and conceding 53 runs.

Winter was also given a contract with Big Bash League team the Melbourne Renegades. He made his Twenty20 debut for the club in BBL|04 when a number of the club's bowlers were unavailable, being called up for international duty. He opened the bowling but only bowled two overs. He made his second appearance for the Renegades later in the season when teammate Peter Siddle was called up to play a Test match.

Winter was again rookie contracted with South Australia for the 2015–16 season, but in his first grade cricket match of the season for Tea Tree Gully he tore a muscle in his side, forcing him out of cricket for several months, including the beginning of BBL|05, and when he did recover from the torn muscle he tore it again trying to return for the Renegades. At the end of the season he was dropped from South Australia's contract list.

=== Comeback (2016–present) ===
Despite no longer having a contract with South Australia, Winter stayed in Adelaide, recovering from his injury while studying a Bachelor of International Studies and Politics at the University of Adelaide. Winter then spent the English summer playing for Plumtree Cricket Club in the Nottinghamshire Premier League taking 31 wickets at an average of 17.42. He bounced back in the 2016–17 season, playing premier grade cricket for the university and being named the team's club champion for the season. Due to his comeback he was going to be offered his first full contract with South Australia for the 2017–18 season, but due to a pay dispute with Cricket Australia the state was unable to offer it to him immediately. Instead, Winter had to train with the state team unpaid for two months before finally being given the contract in August.

Winter played four matches for South Australia in the 2017–18 JLT One-Day Cup. He bowled a total of 30 overs and took 5 wickets at an average of 46.00 with an economy of 7.66.
