= Tom Beaton =

Australian cricketer

Personal information
- Full name: Thomas Michael Beaton
- Born: 28 November 1990 (age 35); Mount Lawley, Western Australia
- Nickname: Beats
- Batting: Right-handed
- Bowling: Right-arm medium
- Role: Batsman

Domestic team information
- Years: Team
- 2010/11–2015/16: Western Australia
- 2011/12–2012/13: Perth Scorchers
- 2014/15–2015/16: Melbourne Renegades
- 2016/17: Otago
- FC debut: 10 February 2011 Western Australia v South Australia
- LA debut: 3 December 2010 Western Australia v Queensland

Career statistics
Competition	FC	LA	T20
Matches	12	11	22
Runs scored	345	268	301
Batting average	27.25	26.80	23.15
100s/50s	0/1	0/2	0/0
Top score	72*	71	41*
Balls bowled	204	–	–
Wickets	2	–	–
Bowling average	60.00	–	–
5 wickets in innings	0	–	–
10 wickets in match	0	–	–
Best bowling	1/15	–	–
Catches/stumpings	9/–	2/–	7/–
- Source: CricketArchive, 30 May 2020

Thomas Michael Beaton (born 28 November 1990) is an Australian cricketer who has played for Western Australia and the Perth Scorchers domestically. A right-handed batsman, he also played with the Melbourne Renegades for the 2014–15 and 2015–16 seasons of the Big Bash League.

== Cricket career ==
As of 2009 Beaton was playing for Mount Lawley in Western Australian club cricket and in August the Cricket Australia Youth Selection Panel selected him in a fourteen-man squad which played five one-day matches against a Sri Lanka side in the Northern Territory. His junior career ultimately included captaining the Australian Under-19 team in a Test match against India in 2009, and he was also a member of the Australian team that won the 2010 ICC Under-19 Cricket World Cup held in New Zealand. In May 2010 he was awarded a rookie contract with the Western Warriors.

Beaton made his List A debut for the Warriors in December 2010 following consistent performances for his club side Mt Lawley and being the second leading run-scorer in the Futures League second-tier national competition. He made a vital 71 runs in his debut match against Queensland, breaking the record for most runs on debut for the Warriors and helping to set a new 5th-wicket partnership for WA against Queensland with captain Adam Voges, as the Warriors won by five wickets. He made his Twenty20 debut on 30 December 2010 in a loss to Tasmania, scoring 16 from 11 balls before being caught in the deep.

In 2012 Beaton had his rookie deal with Western Australia upgraded to a full contract, and also in 2012 he was named as a supplementary player for the Perth Scorchers, eligible to be selected by the Scorchers or any other team in the Big Bash League if there were injuries throughout the season. He represented the Scorchers in the 2012 Champion's League Trophy in South Africa.

In mid-2014 Beaton went to England and played for Skelmanthorpe in the Drakes Huddersfield League in the hopes of expanding his game and he focused on improving his off-spin bowling. He struggled in First-class cricket for Western Australia in the 2014/15 season and in December 2015 he signed with the Melbourne Renegades hoping to perform well in the Big Bash League to move on from the First-class season.

In 2016 Beaton's contract with Western Australia was not renewed. In mid-2016 he joined Carlton for Victorian Premier Cricket, and in late December he received a two-game contract to play for Otago in the Super Smash League and traveled to New Zealand on Christmas Day to represent the side. In 2018 he signed a declaration of intent to qualify as a local New Zealand player so he could play more for Otago, however in order to meet the eligibility criteria he was required to remain in New Zealand for ten out of twelve months for two consecutive years and he ultimately decided to return to Australia to support his family.

In the 2018/19 cricket season Beaton was recruited for Western Australian district side Midland-Guildford and he played his first full season with the club in 2019/20. In late 2020 Beaton was number one draft pick in the Southern Smash, a district T20 competition in Western Australia, selected by the Albany Finance Fury.

Recently Beaton has established a cricket coaching business in Perth, the Tom Beaton Cricket Academy. He was also made captain of the Premium Aussies Cricket Club, a club owned by his wife, which competes in the American Premiere League in the United States.
