= Nick Buchanan (Australian cricketer) =

Australian cricketer

Personal information
- Full name: Nicholas David Buchanan
- Born: 3 April 1991 (age 35); Sunnybank, Brisbane, Queensland, Australia
- Height: 1.96 m (6 ft 5 in)
- Batting: Right-handed
- Bowling: Right-arm medium-fast
- Role: Bowler
- Relatives: John Buchanan (father)

Domestic team information
- Years: Team
- 2011/12: Brisbane Heat (squad no. 16)
- 2016/17: Brisbane Heat (squad no. 16)
- 2017/18: Tasmania (squad no. 16)
- LA debut: 10 October 2017 Tasmania v South Australia
- Twenty20 debut: 16 December 2011 Brisbane Heat v Sydney Sixers

Career statistics
| Competition | List A | Twenty20 |
|---|---|---|
| Matches | 1 | 5 |
| Runs scored | – | 11 |
| Batting average | – | 5.50 |
| 100s/50s | – | 0/0 |
| Top score | – | 8* |
| Balls bowled | 42 | 72 |
| Wickets | 1 | 4 |
| Bowling average | 43.00 | 32.25 |
| 5 wickets in innings | 0 | 0 |
| 10 wickets in match | 0 | 0 |
| Best bowling | 1/43 | 2/42 |
| Catches/stumpings | 1/– | 3/– |
- Source: ESPNcricinfo, 22 March 2021

Nicholas David Buchanan (born 3 April 1991) is an Australian cricketer. He made his Twenty20 (T20) debut for Brisbane Heat in the 2011–12 Big Bash League season on 16 December 2011. In August 2017, he was named in the 2017/18 squad for Tasmania, making his List A debut on 10 October 2017 against South Australia.
