= Hamish Kingston =

Australian cricketer (born 1990)

Personal information
- Full name: Hamish Phillip Kingston
- Born: 17 December 1990 (age 35); Hobart, Tasmania
- Batting: Right-handed
- Bowling: Right-arm fast medium
- Role: Bowler

Domestic team information
- Years: Team
- 2014/15–2018/19: Tasmania
- 2015/16: Adelaide Strikers
- 2016/17: Hobart Hurricanes

Career statistics
Competition	FC	LA	T20
Matches	11	13	5
Runs scored	209	86	29
Batting average	13.93	17.20	14.50
100s/50s	0/0	0/0	0/0
Top score	29	39	17
Balls bowled	1,854	534	72
Wickets	32	16	4
Bowling average	38.84	27.06	33.50
5 wickets in innings	0	0	0
10 wickets in match	0	0	0
Best bowling	4/61	3/44	2/20
Catches/stumpings	5/–	7/–	1/–
- Source: Cricinfo, 27 April 2023

Hamish Phillip Kingston (born 17 December 1990) is an Australian former cricketer. He played for Tasmania. On 31 December 2015 he made his Twenty20 debut for the Adelaide Strikers in the 2015–16 Big Bash League.
