= Guy Walker =

Australian cricketer (born 1995)

Personal information
- Born: 12 September 1995 (age 31); Nottingham, England
- Batting: Right handed
- Bowling: Right arm medium-fast

Career statistics
Competition	T20
Matches	1
Runs scored	–
Batting average	–
100s/50s	–
Top score	–
Balls bowled	18
Wickets	0
Bowling average	–
5 wickets in innings	–
10 wickets in match	–
Best bowling	–
Catches/stumpings	0/–
- Source: Cricinfo, 5 October 2021

Guy Walker (born 12 September 1995) is an Australian cricketer. He was born in Nottinghamshire whilst his father, Lyndsay Walker, was playing county cricket for Nottinghamshire County Cricket Club.

He made his Twenty20 (T20) debut for Melbourne Renegades in the 2015–16 Big Bash League season on 19 December 2015. In late 2018, Walker signed as an Australian rules football rookie with Melbourne, but retired due to a shoulder nerve injury one year later without having played an AFL game.
