= Andrew Tye =

Australian cricketer (born 1986)

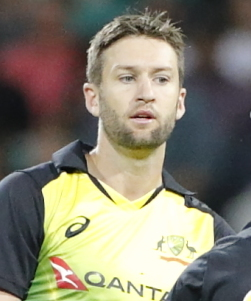
- Tye in 2018

Personal information
- Full name: Andrew James Tye
- Born: 12 December 1986 (age 39); Perth, Western Australia
- Height: 1.91 m (6 ft 3 in)
- Batting: Right-handed
- Bowling: Right-arm medium-fast
- Role: Bowler

International information
- National side: Australia (2016–2021)
- ODI debut (cap 222): 14 January 2018 v England
- Last ODI: 19 June 2018 v England
- ODI shirt no.: 68
- T20I debut (cap 78): 29 January 2016 v India
- Last T20I: 7 August 2021 v Bangladesh
- T20I shirt no.: 68

Domestic team information
- Years: Team
- 2013/14–present: Western Australia
- 2013/14: Sydney Thunder
- 2014/15–2024/25: Perth Scorchers
- 2016: Gloucestershire
- 2017: Gujarat Lions
- 2018–2019: Kings XI Punjab
- 2018–2019: Gloucestershire
- 2020: Rajasthan Royals
- 2022: Lucknow Super Giants
- 2022: Durham
- 2023: Karachi Kings
- 2023: Northamptonshire
- 2023: Seattle Orcas
- 2024: Washington Freedom
- 2025/26: Melbourne Renegades
- 2026: Yorkshire
- 2026: London Spirit

Career statistics
Competition	ODI	T20I	LA	T20
Matches	7	32	70	266
Runs scored	57	83	396	909
Batting average	14.25	10.37	15.23	13.17
100s/50s	0/0	0/0	0/0	0/0
Top score	19	20	44	44
Balls bowled	387	683	3,462	5,674
Wickets	12	47	148	367
Bowling average	32.66	21.21	21.62	21.51
5 wickets in innings	1	0	4	3
10 wickets in match	0	0	0	0
Best bowling	5/46	4/23	6/46	5/17
Catches/stumpings	1/–	10/–	19/–	102/–
- Source: Cricinfo, 15 August 2026

Andrew James "AJ" Tye (born 12 December 1986) is an Australian cricketer who played One Day Internationals (ODIs) and Twenty20 Internationals (T20Is) for the Australian national cricket team. At the domestic level he plays for Western Australia and Melbourne Renegades. He is most famous for his use of the knuckle ball and wide variation of pace.

== Early career ==
From the northern suburbs of Perth, Tye played second XI cricket in England for Somerset, Durham and Northamptonshire before making his list A debut in the 2013–14 Ryobi One-Day Cup aged 26. He took the second most wickets in the tournament and returned the best single innings bowling figures of 5 wickets for 46 runs against Tasmania.

Following his impressive performances in the One Day tournament, he signed with the Sydney Thunder for the 2013–14 Big Bash League season. For the 2014–15 Big Bash League season however, he switched to play for the Perth Scorchers.

He was seen as a breakout player in BBL|04, with Australian T20 captain Aaron Finch labelling him as the 'find of the tournament'. He enjoyed success with the team, and was a focal contributor to Perth's second successive Big Bash League title.

At grade cricket level, Tye plays for Scarborough.

== Indian Premier League ==
Tye was bought by the Chennai Super Kings in the auction for the 2015 Indian Premier League but did not play in the IPL until 2017 IPL when he first played for Gujarat Lions. On his debut, he took a five-wicket haul, including a hat-trick. His bowling figures of 5/17 were the best by a bowler on debut in the IPL, until Alzarri Joseph broke his record with figures of 6/12 against Sunrisers Hyderabad in the 2019 IPL.

In January 2018, Tye was bought by Kings XI Punjab in the 2018 IPL auction. During the tournament, Tye broke a record. On 16 May 2018, against the Mumbai Indians when he picked up the figures of 4–16, he went on to become the first ever player to take three 4 wicket-haul in a single season of the IPL. Tye then went on to win the Purple Cap for the 2018 IPL season for taking the most wickets (24) during the season. For his excellent performances in the 2018 IPL season, he was named in ESPNcricinfo’s and Cricbuzz’s 2018 IPL team of the tournament.

Tye played for Kings XI franchise in the 2019 IPL season before he was released by them ahead of the 2020 IPL auction.

Tye was sold to Rajasthan Royals for the 2020 season. He played one game for them, taking figures of 1/50 against Delhi Capitals.

On 23 March 2022, Tye was signed as replacement for the injured Mark Wood by the Lucknow Super Giants. In the 2022 season, he played only 3 matches taking 2 wickets. He was released by the Lucknow Super Giants ahead of the Indian Premier League 2023 Auction. In the 2023 Auction, he had kept a base price of 1 cr. but was unsold.

== International career ==
He made his Twenty20 International debut for Australia against India on 29 January 2016. In January 2018, he was named in Australia's One Day International (ODI) squad for their series against England. He made his ODI debut for Australia against England on 14 January 2018.

In April 2018, he was awarded a national contract by Cricket Australia for the 2018–19 season. He went on to become the leading wicket taker in T20IS in 2018 with 31 wickets. On 16 July 2020, Tye was named in a 26-man preliminary squad of players to begin training ahead of a possible tour to England following the COVID-19 pandemic. On 14 August 2020, Cricket Australia confirmed that the fixtures would be taking place, with Tye included in the touring party. In November 2020, Tye replaced Kane Richardson in the Australian squad for T20I and ODI matches against India.
