= Michael Hill (cricketer, born 1988) =

Australian cricketer (born 1988)

Personal information
- Full name: Michael William Hill
- Born: 29 September 1988 (age 38); Greensborough, Victoria
- Batting: Left-handed
- Bowling: Right-arm medium
- Role: Batsman
- Relatives: Sharyn Hill (mother)

Domestic team information
- Years: Team
- 2008/09–2013/14: Victoria
- 2012/13–2013/14: Melbourne Renegades
- 2014/15: Tasmania
- 2014/15–2015/16: Hobart Hurricanes

Career statistics
Competition	FC	LA	T20
Matches	20	28	14
Runs scored	823	441	308
Batting average	24.93	23.21	25.66
100s/50s	2/2	0/1	0/1
Top score	144	88	64
Balls bowled	60	–	–
Wickets	1	–	–
Bowling average	39.00	–	–
5 wickets in innings	0	–	–
10 wickets in match	0	–	–
Best bowling	1/8	–	–
Catches/stumpings	17/–	10/–	9/–
- Source: ESPN Cricinfo, 12 December 2023

Michael William Hill (born 29 September 1988) is an Australian cricketer. He is a left-handed batsman and a right arm medium bowler. He played his junior cricket at Diamond Creek Cricket Club and was the captain of the Victoria under-19 team in 2007. He was also appointed captain of the Australian under-19 team for the 2008 under-19 World Cup.

Hill made hist List A debut for Victoria on 26 October 2008 at Brisbane Cricket Ground. He did not bat or bowl, as Victoria's top order chased down Queensland's target successfully. He made his first class debut against Western Australia at the WACA on 10 October 2010. He made 47 off 111 balls in his first innings and hit 8 fours in his innings. He scored 17 not out in his second innings, Victoria went on to win the game by 8 wickets.

Prior to the 2014–15 season, he was recruited by Tasmania and played three games for the Tigers in the 2014–15 Matador BBQs One-Day Cup.

Hill is the son of Sharyn Hill who played three tests and fourteen one day internationals for the Australia national women's cricket team.
