= Andrew Fekete (cricketer) =

Australian cricketer

Personal information
- Full name: Andrew Loton Fekete
- Born: 18 May 1985 (age 41)
- Batting: Right-handed
- Bowling: Right-arm fast-medium
- Role: Bowler

Domestic team information
- Years: Team
- 2011/12: Victoria
- 2012/13–2017/18: Tasmania (squad no. 17)
- 2013/14–2014/15: Melbourne Renegades (squad no. 17)
- 2015/16: Brisbane Heat (squad no. 17)
- 2017/18: Sydney Thunder (squad no. 12)
- 2018/19–2019/20: Melbourne Renegades (squad no. 17)
- 2018/19–2019/20: Victoria

Career statistics
Competition	FC	LA	T20
Matches	39	28	15
Runs scored	318	74	3
Batting average	9.93	18.50	1.50
100s/50s	0/0	0/0	0/0
Top score	30	15	1*
Balls bowled	7,137	1,334	239
Wickets	128	38	10
Bowling average	30.69	30.44	40.50
5 wickets in innings	4	0	0
10 wickets in match	1	0	0
Best bowling	6/67	4/30	2/27
Catches/stumpings	9/–	5/–	0/–
- Source: Cricinfo, 7 April 2020

Andrew Loton Fekete (born 18 May 1985) is an Australian cricketer who has played for Victoria and Tasmania.

The Victorian-born Fekete made his List A debut for Victoria in February 2012. He took 2/42, but broke his foot while bowling, courtesy of a powerful hit by Theo Doropoulos. Fekete's next game came in February 2013, after almost a year and a move to Tasmania. In October 2013, he played his third List A match, took 4/38, and earned the man of the match award.

Fekete made his first class debut in November 2013. In the 2014–15 Sheffield Shield season, he was the second highest wicket-taker, taking 37 wickets at 24.10. He played two matches for Australia A in July 2015, and in September was selected as part of the Australian Test squad for its tour of Bangladesh.

Fekete signed for the Sydney Thunder in the Big Bash League during the 2017–18 Big Bash League season.

In March 2018, Fekete took career-best match figures of 10/110 in Tasmania's fixture against Victoria to progress Tasmania to the final of the 2017–18 Sheffield Shield season.
