= Cameron Stevenson =

American cricketer

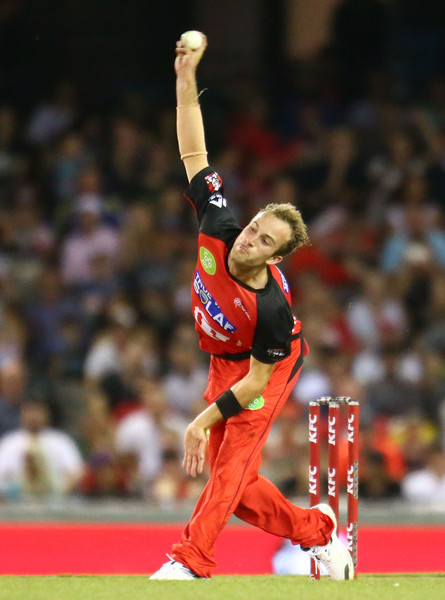

Personal information
- Full name: Cameron Aaron Henry Stevenson
- Born: 30 October 1992 (age 34); Victoria, Australia
- Batting: Right-handed
- Bowling: Right-arm fast medium
- Role: All-rounder

International information
- National side: United States
- ODI debut (cap 31): 8 December 2019 v UAE
- Last ODI: 17 September 2022 v Namibia
- ODI shirt no.: 13
- T20I debut (cap 28): 12 July 2022 v Singapore
- Last T20I: 17 July 2022 v PNG

Domestic team information
- Years: Team
- 2015/16–2016/17: Melbourne Renegades
- 2016/17: Tasmania
- 2023-present: Texas Super Kings

Career statistics
Competition	ODI	T20I	FC	LA
Matches	18	4	8	24
Runs scored	141	13	130	230
Batting average	10.84	4.33	16.25	15.33
100s/50s	0/0	0/0	0/0	0/0
Top score	34*	8	42	34*
Balls bowled	693	72	1,310	991
Wickets	23	4	22	35
Bowling average	27.91	24.50	38.40	25.05
5 wickets in innings	0	0	0	1
10 wickets in match	0	0	0	0
Best bowling	3/22	1/15	4/110	5/32
Catches/stumpings	3/–	2/–	2/–	4/–
- Source: ESPNcricinfo, 21 April 2023

Cameron Stevenson (born 30 October 1992) is an Australian-born American cricketer who represents the United States cricket team. He is a right-handed batsman and right-arm fast medium bowler.

He made his T20 debut for Melbourne Renegades against Sydney Sixers on 23 December 2015. He made his List A debut for Tasmania against South Australia on 19 October 2016. He made his first-class debut for Tasmania in the 2016–17 Sheffield Shield season on 4 November 2016.

Stevenson holds a United States passport, and in November 2019, he was named in the United States' squad for the 2019–20 Regional Super50 tournament. On 11 November 2019, he made his debut for the United States, against Guyana.

In December 2019, he was named in the United States' One Day International (ODI) squad for the 2019 United Arab Emirates Tri-Nation Series. He made his ODI debut for the United States, against the United Arab Emirates on 8 December 2019.

In June 2022, Stevenson was named in the USA's Twenty20 International (T20I) squad for the 2022 ICC Men's T20 World Cup Global Qualifier B tournament in Zimbabwe. He made his T20I debut on 12 July 2022, for the USA against Singapore.

In March 2023, Stevenson was drafted by the Texas Super Kings for the inaugural season of Major League Cricket.
