= Tim Ludeman =

Australian cricketer (born 1987)

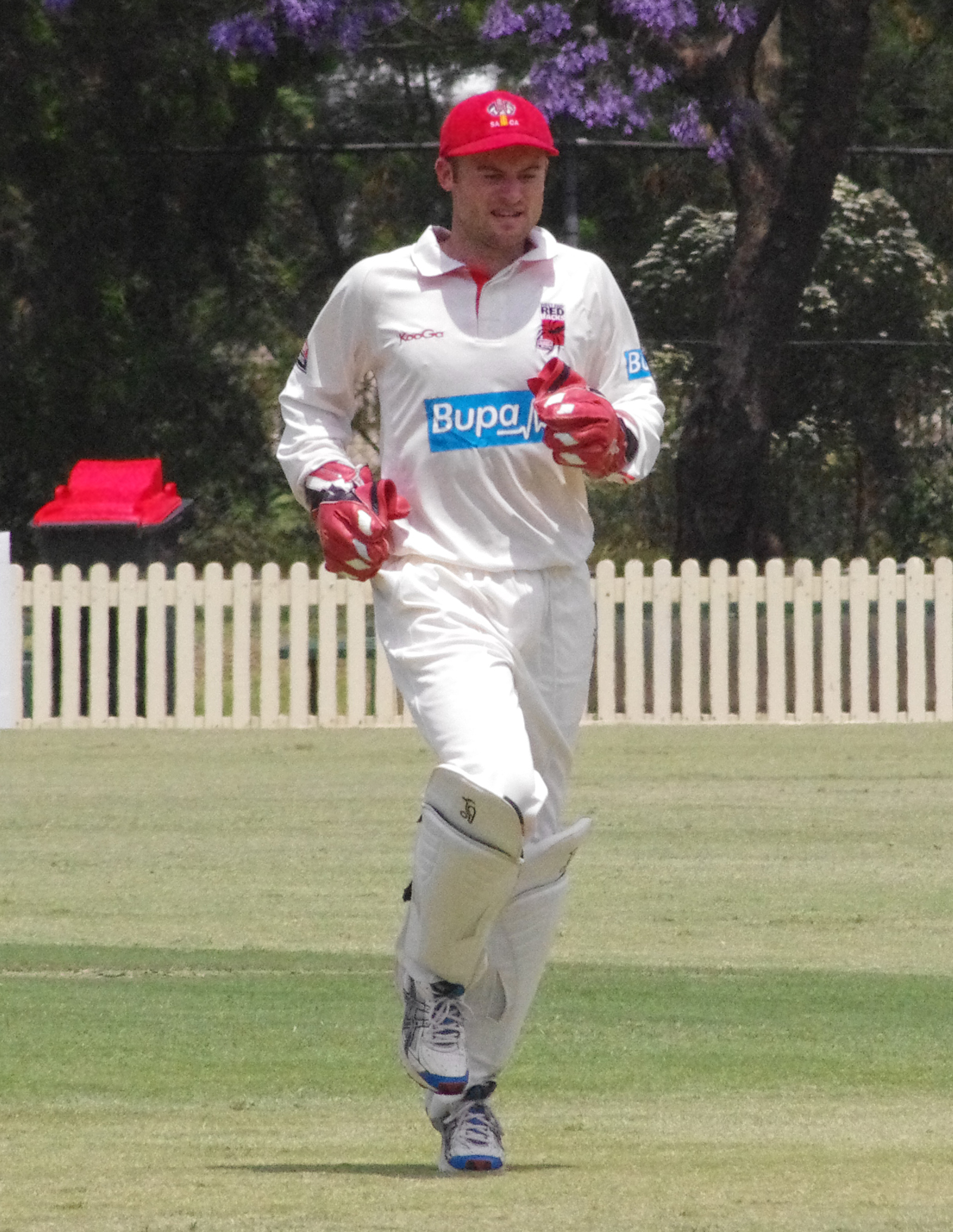

Personal information
- Full name: Timothy Paul Ludeman
- Born: 23 June 1987 (age 39); Warrnambool, Victoria, Australia
- Nickname: Ludes
- Height: 1.76 m (5 ft 9 in)
- Batting: Right-handed
- Role: Wicketkeeper-Batsman

Domestic team information
- Years: Team
- 2009/10–2016/17: South Australia
- 2012/13–2016/17: Adelaide Strikers
- 2017/18–2018/19: Melbourne Renegades

Career statistics
Competition	FC	LA	T20
Matches	47	36	55
Runs scored	1,658	528	941
Batting average	23.35	18.85	26.13
100s/50s	2/7	0/2	0/5
Top score	106	52	92*
Catches/stumpings	158/7	28/3	31/4
- Source: ESPNCricinfo, 7 October 2021

Tim Ludeman (born 23 June 1987) is an Australian cricketer. Ludeman is a wicket-keeper who formerly played for South Australia. He is a right-handed batsman and wicket-keeper.

On 18 December 2014, Ludeman made 92 not out from just 44 deliveries in a Big Bash League match for the Adelaide Strikers against the Melbourne Stars. His fifty came off 18 balls, making it the fastest in BBL history at the time.
