= Trent Lawford =

Australian cricketer (born 1988)

Personal information
- Born: 18 April 1988 (age 38); Melbourne, Australia
- Batting: Right-handed
- Bowling: Right-arm medium-fast
- Role: Bowling all-rounder

Domestic team information
- Years: Team
- 2013/14–2014/15: South Australia
- 2014/15: Adelaide Strikers
- 2015/16: Sydney Sixers
- 2016/17: Northern Districts
- 2016/17: Melbourne Renegades (squad no. 37)

Career statistics
Competition	FC	LA	T20
Matches	7	2	10
Runs scored	221	61	30
Batting average	24.55	30.50	7.50
100s/50s	0/1	0/1	0/0
Top score	81*	61	7
Balls bowled	1,416	85	168
Wickets	23	1	5
Bowling average	36.21	119.00	49.40
5 wickets in innings	1	0	0
10 wickets in match	0	0	0
Best bowling	5/82	1/49	2/34
Catches/stumpings	1/–	0/–	1/–
- Source: ESPNcricinfo, 3 May 2022

Trent Lawford (born 18 April 1988) is an Australian cricketer. He has played for South Australia in the Sheffield Shield and in Australian domestic limited-overs cricket; as well as the Adelaide Strikers, Sydney Sixers and Melbourne Renegades in the Big Bash League and Northern Districts in the Super Smash in New Zealand.

Lawford made his first-class cricket debut for South Australia against Western Australia in November 2013.

He won the Jack Ryder Medal in Victorian Premier cricket for the 2017–18 season.
