= 2013–14 Melbourne Renegades season =

Melbourne Renegades
2013–14 season
- Coach: Simon Helmot
- Captain(s): Aaron Finch
- Home ground: Etihad Stadium
- BBL Season: 6th
- BBL Finals: DNQ
- Leading Run Scorer: Aaron Finch (262)
- Leading Wicket Taker: Nathan Rimmington (10)
- Highest home attendance: 42,837
- Lowest home attendance: 10,896
- Average home attendance: 21,929

The 2013–14 Melbourne Renegades season was the third in the club's history. Coached by David Saker and captained by Aaron Finch, they competed in the BBL's 2013–14 season.

== Summary ==
Despite maintaining the majority of their squad from the previous season, and also recruiting Australian test bowlers Peter Siddle and James Pattinson, the Renegades struggled in the 2013–14 Big Bash League season, only winning 3 games, and in the process finishing 6th and missing the finals.

== Fixtures ==
=== Regular season ===
20 December
19:40 (D/N)
Scorecard

| (H) Melbourne Stars; 7/208 (20 overs) | v | Melbourne Renegades; 132 (17.3 overs) |
| Luke Wright 70 (32); Nathan Rimmington 2/34 (4 overs) | | Jos Buttler 49 (28); Jackson Bird 4/31 (4 overs) |

Melbourne Stars won by 76 runs
Melbourne Cricket Ground
Attendance: 25,266
Umpires: Simon Fry and John Ward
Player of the match: Luke Wright (Melbourne Stars)

- Melbourne Renegades won the toss and elected to field.

26 December
16:40 (D/N)
Scorecard

| (H) Perth Scorchers; 7/117 (20 overs) | v | Melbourne Renegades; 8/111 (20 overs) |
| Shaun Marsh 31 (34); Nathan Rimmington 2/14 (4 overs) | | Alex Doolan 21 (15); Yasir Arafat 3/15 (4 overs) |

Perth Scorchers won by 6 runs
Western Australia Cricket Association Ground, Perth
Attendance: 15,953
Umpires: Mick Martell and Paul Wilson
Player of the match: Yasir Arafat (Perth Scorchers)

- Perth Scorchers won the toss and elected to bat.

30 December
19:40 (D/N)
Scorecard

| (H) Melbourne Renegades; 3/210 (20 overs) | v | Brisbane Heat; 153 (19.2 overs) |
| Aaron Finch 81 (51); Dan Christian 2/43 (4 overs) | | Ben Cutting 40 (19); James Pattinson 3/36 (4 overs) |

Melbourne Renegades won by 57 runs
Docklands Stadium, Melbourne
Attendance: 19,832
Umpires: Geoff Joshua and Sam Nogajski
Player of the match: Aaron Finch (Melbourne Renegades)

- Melbourne Renegades won the toss and elected to bat.

1 January
13:50
Scorecard

| Melbourne Renegades; 8/162 (20 overs) | v | Hobart Hurricanes (H); 111 (17.1 overs) |
| Aaron Finch 50 (31); Ben Laughlin 3/16 (4 overs) | | Tim Paine 31 (28); James Pattinson 4/24 (4 overs) |

Melbourne Renegades won by 51 runs
Bellerive Oval, Hobart
Attendance: 10,924
Umpires: Geoff Joshua and Ian Lock
Player of the match: James Pattinson (Melbourne Renegades)

- Melbourne Renegades won the toss and elected to bat.

4 January
19:10 (D/N)
Scorecard

| (H) Melbourne Renegades; 5/163 (20 overs) | v | Melbourne Stars; 1/167 (16.2 overs) |
| Aaron Finch 84* (55); Jackson Bird 3/24 (4 overs) | | Cameron White 84* (49); Aaron O'Brien 1/38 (3 overs) |

Melbourne Stars won by 9 wickets
Docklands Stadium, Melbourne
Attendance: 42,837
Umpires: Ashley Barrow and Tony Ward
Player of the match: Cameron White (Melbourne Stars)

- Melbourne Renegades won the toss and elected to bat.

14 January
19:40 (D/N)
Scorecard

| (H) Melbourne Renegades; 104 (18.3 overs) | v | Sydney Thunder; 1/105 (11.3 overs) |
| Daniel Harris 30 (31); Gurinder Sandhu 3/21 (4 overs) | | Usman Khawaja 46* (34); James Pattinson 1/30 (3.3 overs) |

Sydney Thunder won by 9 wickets
Docklands Stadium, Melbourne
Attendance: 10,896
Umpires: Geoff Joshua and Tony Ward
Player of the match: Gurinder Sandhu (Sydney Thunder)

- Melbourne Renegades won the toss and elected to bat

18 January
19:40 (D/N)
Scorecard

| Sydney Sixers; 6/151 (20 overs) | v | Melbourne Renegades (H); 5/149 (20 overs) |
| Moisés Henriques 55 (39); Nathan Rimmington 2/35 (4 overs) | | Dwayne Bravo 38 (30); Josh Hazlewood 1/22 (4 overs) |

Sydney Sixers won by 2 runs
Docklands Stadium, Melbourne
Attendance: 14,152
Umpires: Damien Mealey and Tony Ward
Player of the match: Moisés Henriques (Sydney Sixers)

- Melbourne Renegades won the toss and elected to field

22 January
20:10 (D/N)
Scorecard

| Melbourne Renegades; 6/155 (20 overs) | v | Adelaide Strikers (H); 7/154 (20 overs) |
| Dwayne Bravo 47 (33); Jon Holland 2/19 (4 overs) | | Michael Neser 35* (24); Peter Siddle 3/35 (4 overs) |

Melbourne Renegades won by 1 run
Adelaide Oval, Adelaide
Attendance: 21,745
Umpires: Damien Mealey and Tony Ward
Player of the match: Dwayne Bravo (Melbourne Renegades)

- Melbourne Renegades won the toss and elected to bat.

== Ladder ==
| Pos | Team | Pld | W | L | NR | Pts | NRR | Qualification |
|---|---|---|---|---|---|---|---|---|
| 1 | Melbourne Stars | 8 | 8 | 0 | 0 | 16 | 2.189 | Advanced to semi-finals |
| 2 | Sydney Sixers | 8 | 6 | 2 | 0 | 12 | −0.218 | Advanced to semi-finals |
| 3 | Perth Scorchers (C) | 8 | 5 | 3 | 0 | 10 | −0.064 | Advanced to semi-finals |
| 4 | Hobart Hurricanes | 8 | 3 | 4 | 1 | 7 | 0.321 | Advanced to semi-finals |
| 5 | Brisbane Heat | 8 | 3 | 5 | 0 | 6 | −0.197 | |
| 6 | Melbourne Renegades | 8 | 3 | 5 | 0 | 6 | −0.475 | |
| 7 | Adelaide Strikers | 8 | 2 | 5 | 1 | 5 | −0.933 | |
| 8 | Sydney Thunder | 8 | 1 | 7 | 0 | 2 | −0.654 | |

(C) Champions

=== Ladder progress ===
| Round | 1 | 2 | 3 | 4 | 5 | 6 | 7 | 8 |
|---|---|---|---|---|---|---|---|---|
| Ground | A | A | H | A | H | H | H | A |
| Result | L | L | W | W | L | L | L | W |
| Position | 8 | 8 | 5 | 3 | | | | 6 |

Source: Competitive Matches
A = Away; H = Home; W = Win; D = Draw; L = Lose

== Squad information ==
The following is the Renegades men squad for the 2013–14 Big Bash League season.

| S/N | Name | Nationality | Date of birth (age) | Batting style | Bowling style | Notes |
Batsmen
| 5 | Aaron Finch | Australia | 17 November 1986 (age 39) | Right-handed | Left arm orthodox | Captain |
| 26 | Tom Cooper | Netherlands | 26 November 1986 (age 39) | Right-handed | Right arm off spin | Non-visa Dutch international |
| 14 | Alex Doolan | Australia | 29 November 1985 (age 40) | Right-handed | Right arm medium | |
| 29 | Daniel Harris | Australia | 31 December 1979 (age 46) | Right-handed | Right arm medium | |
| 33 | Michael Hill | Australia | 29 September 1988 (age 37) | Left-handed | Right arm medium | |
| 99 | Ben Rohrer | Australia | 26 March 1981 (age 45) | Left-handed | – | |
All-rounders
| 31 | Will Sheridan | Australia | 5 May 1987 (age 39) | Right-handed | Left arm fast medium | |
| 11 | Aaron O'Brien | Australia | 2 October 1981 (age 44) | Left-handed | Left-arm orthodox | |
| – | Mohammad Hafeez | Pakistan | 17 October 1980 (age 45) | Right-handed | Right arm off spin | Visa contract |
| 47 | Dwayne Bravo | West Indies | 7 October 1983 (age 42) | Right-handed | Right arm fast medium | Visa contract |
| – | Matthew Short | Australia | 8 November 1995 (age 30) | Right-handed | Right arm off spin | Development rookie contract |
| 7 | Solomon Mire | Zimbabwe | 21 August 1989 (age 37) | Right-handed | Right arm fast medium | Community rookie contract |
Wicketkeepers
| 20 | Peter Nevill | Australia | 13 October 1985 (age 40) | Right-handed | – | |
| 9 | Jos Buttler | England | 8 September 1990 (age 35) | Right-handed | – | Visa contract |
Pace bowlers
| 28 | Jayde Herrick | Australia | 16 January 1985 (age 41) | Right-handed | Right arm fast medium | |
| 35 | Nathan Rimmington | Australia | 11 November 1982 (age 43) | Right-handed | Right arm fast medium | |
| 19 | James Pattinson | Australia | 3 May 1990 (age 36) | Left-handed | Right arm fast | |
| 10 | Peter Siddle | Australia | 25 November 1984 (age 41) | Right-handed | Right arm fast medium | |
| 32 | Matthew Gale | Australia | 28 November 1983 (age 42) | Right-handed | Right arm fast medium | |
| – | Jake Haberfield | Australia | 18 June 1986 (age 40) | Right-handed | Right arm fast medium | |
| – | Jake Reed | Australia | 28 September 1990 (age 35) | - | Right arm fast | |
| – | Andrew Fekete | Australia | 18 May 1985 (age 41) | Right-handed | Right arm fast medium | |
Spin bowlers
| 8 | Muttiah Muralitharan | Sri Lanka | 17 April 1972 (age 54) | Right-handed | Right arm off spin | Visa contract |
| 23 | Fawad Ahmed | Australia | 5 February 1982 (age 44) | Right-handed | Right arm leg spin | |

== Season statistics ==
=== Home attendance ===
| Match | Opponent | Attendance |
|---|---|---|
| 3 | Brisbane Heat | 19,832 |
| 5 | Melbourne Stars | 42,837 |
| 6 | Sydney Thunder | 10,896 |
| 7 | Sydney Sixers | 14,152 |
| Total Attendance | | 87,717 |
| Average Attendance | | 21,929 |
