= 2012–13 Melbourne Renegades season =

Melbourne Renegades
2012–13 season
- President: James Brayshaw
- Coach: Simon Helmot
- Captain(s): Aaron Finch
- Home ground: Etihad Stadium
- BBL Season: 1st
- BBL Finals: Semi-final
- Leading Run Scorer: Aaron Finch (332)
- Leading Wicket Taker: Muttiah Muralitharan (11)
- Highest home attendance: 23,589
- Lowest home attendance: 5,029
- Average home attendance: 13,406

The 2012–13 Melbourne Renegades season was the second in the club's history. Coached by Simon Helmot and captained by Aaron Finch, they competed in the BBL's 2012–13 season.

== Summary ==
The 2012–13 Big Bash League season saw the Renegades release several star players including the previous seasons captain, Andrew McDonald. However the recruitment of consistent players such as Ben Rohrer and Peter Nevill and cricket legend Muttiah Muralitharan, saw the season being the Renegades most successful season to date, finishing on top of the ladder, only losing to the Perth Scorchers in the regular season. Aaron Finch also became the first Renegades player to score a century after scoring 111 from 65 balls against the Melbourne Stars. Finch also won The Renegades were knocked out by the Brisbane Heat in the semi-finals, losing by 15 runs.

== Fixtures ==
=== Regular season ===
7 December
19:00 (D/N)
Scorecard

Melbourne Stars; 5/167 (20 overs)	v	Melbourne Renegades (H); 2/168 (18.2 overs)
Luke Wright 53 (41); Aaron O'Brien 2/27 (4 overs)		Aaron Finch 111* (65); Jackson Bird 1/29 (4 overs)

Melbourne Renegades won by 8 wickets
Docklands Stadium, Melbourne
Attendance: 23,589
Umpires: Simon Fry & Paul Reiffel
Player of the match: Aaron Finch (Melbourne Renegades)

- Melbourne Stars won the toss and elected to bat

14 December
19:00 (D/N)
Scorecard

(H) Sydney Thunder; 7/116 (20 overs)	v	Melbourne Renegades; 5/117 (18.2 overs)
Chris Tremain 37* (23); Aaron O'Brien 3/15 (3 overs)		Aaron Finch 31 (33); Azhar Mahmood 2/18 (4 overs)

Melbourne Renegades won by 5 wickets
Stadium Australia, Sydney
Attendance: 7,413
Umpires: Ashley Barrow & Tony Ward
Player of the match: Aaron O'Brien (Melbourne Renegades)

- Melbourne Renegades won the toss and elected to field

19 December
19:00 (D/N)
Scorecard

Hobart Hurricanes; 9/102 (20 overs)	v	Melbourne Renegades (H); 3/103 (13.2 overs)
Ricky Ponting 25 (25); Nathan Rimmington 3/18 (4 overs)		Aaron Finch 46* (40); Xavier Doherty 2/17 (4 overs)

Melbourne Renegades won by 7 wickets
Docklands Stadium, Melbourne
Attendance: 7,951
Umpires: Sam Nogajski & John Ward
Player of the match: Marlon Samuels (Melbourne Renegades)

- Melbourne Renegades won the toss and elected to field

22 December
19:00 (D/N)
Scorecard

Brisbane Heat; 7/133 (20 overs)	v	Melbourne Renegades (H); 4/137 (19.1 overs)
Thisara Perera 38 (24); Muttiah Muralitharan 2/22 (4 overs)		Aaron Finch 33 (34); Ben Cutting 2/12 (4 overs)

Melbourne Renegades won by 6 wickets
Docklands Stadium, Melbourne
Attendance: 7,023
Umpires: Gerard Abood & Bruce Oxenford
Player of the match: Ben Cutting (Brisbane Heat)

- Brisbane Heat won the toss and elected to bat

29 December
18:00 (D/N)
Scorecard

(H) Perth Scorchers; 3/187 (20 overs)	v	Melbourne Renegades; 136 (19.1 overs)
Shaun Marsh 85 (52); Will Sheridan 1/22 (3 overs)		Ben Rohrer 52 (33); Alfonso Thomas 4/8 (3 overs)

Perth Scorchers won by 51 runs
Western Australia Cricket Association Ground, Perth
Attendance: 14,000
Umpires: Geoff Joshua & Mick Martell
Player of the match: Shaun Marsh (Perth Scorchers)

- Melbourne Renegades won the toss and elected to field
- Twenty20 debut: Jason Behrendorff (Perth Scorchers)

2 January
19:00 (D/N)
Scorecard

(H) Melbourne Renegades; 6/155 (20 overs)	v	Adelaide Strikers; 107 (18.3 overs)
Tom Cooper 59 (46); Brad Young 2/37 (4 overs)		Johan Botha 31 (31); Muttiah Muralitharan 3/18 (4 overs)

Melbourne Renegades won by 48 runs
Docklands Stadium, Melbourne
Attendance: 14,174
Umpires: Paul Wilson and Sam Nogajski
Player of the match: Muttiah Muralitharan (Melbourne Renegades)

- Adelaide Strikers won the toss and elected to field

6 January
19:00 (D/N)
Scorecard

(H) Melbourne Stars; 9/146 (20 overs)	v	Melbourne Renegades; 1/147 (18.5 overs)
Luke Wright 29 (22); Will Sheridan 3/36 (4 overs)		Aaron Finch 67* (47); Shane Warne 1/24 (4 overs)

Melbourne Renegades won by 9 wickets
Melbourne Cricket Ground, Melbourne
Attendance: 46,581
Umpires: Sam Nogajski & Simon Fry
Player of the match: Aaron Finch (Melbourne Renegades)

- Melbourne Stars won the toss and elected to bat

9 January
19:00 (D/N)
Scorecard

Melbourne Renegades; 5/178 (20 overs)	v	Sydney Sixers (H); 149 (20 overs)
Alex Hales 89 (52); Moisés Henriques 1/9 (1 over)		Stephen O'Keefe 41 (29); Nathan Rimmington 3/27 (4 overs)

Melbourne Renegades won by 29 runs
Sydney Cricket Ground
Attendance: 17,801
Umpires: Gerard Abood & Ashley Barrow
Player of the match: Alex Hales (Melbourne Renegades)

- Melbourne Renegades won the toss and elected to bat
- Twenty20 debut: Fawad Ahmed (Melbourne Renegades)

=== Knockout stage ===
15 January
19:00 (D/N)
Scorecard

Melbourne Renegades; 9/168 (20 overs)	v	Brisbane Heat; 3/183 (20 overs)
Ben Rohrer 42 (22); Ben Cutting 3/24 (4 overs)		Luke Pomersbach 112* (70); Aaron Finch 1/23 (2 overs)

Brisbane Heat won by 15 runs
Docklands Stadium, Melbourne
Attendance: 16,285
Umpires: John Ward & Paul Wilson
Player of the match: Luke Pomersbach (Brisbane Heat)

- Brisbane Heat won the toss and elected to bat.

== Ladder ==
Pos	Team	Pld	W	L	NR	Pts	NRR	Qualification
1	Melbourne Renegades	8	7	1	0	14	0.791	Advanced to semi-finals
2	Perth Scorchers	8	5	3	0	10	1.322	Advanced to semi-finals
3	Melbourne Stars	8	5	3	0	10	0.246	Advanced to semi-finals
4	Brisbane Heat (C)	8	4	4	0	8	0.464	Advanced to semi-finals
5	Adelaide Strikers	8	4	4	0	8	−0.162	
6	Hobart Hurricanes	8	4	4	0	8	−0.569	
7	Sydney Sixers	8	3	5	0	6	−0.380	
8	Sydney Thunder	8	0	8	0	0	−1.360	

(C) Champions

=== Ladder progress ===
Round	1	2	3	4	5	6	7	8
Ground	H	A	H	A	A	H	A	A
Result	W	W	W	W	L	W	W	W
Position	1	1	1	1	2	1	1	1

Source: Competitive Matches
A = Away; H = Home; W = Win; D = Draw; L = Lose

== Squad information ==
The current squad of the Melbourne Renegades for the 2012–13 Big Bash League season.

S/N	Name	Nationality	Date of birth (age)	Batting style	Bowling style	Notes
Batsmen
	Meyrick Buchanan	Australia	13 September 1993 (age 31)	Right-handed	Right arm off break	
	Tom Cooper	Netherlands	26 November 1986 (age 38)	Right-handed	Right arm off break	Non-visa Dutch international
	Alex Doolan	Australia	25 November 1985 (age 39)	Right-handed	Right arm medium	
	Aaron Finch	Australia	17 November 1986 (age 38)	Right-handed	Slow left-arm orthodox	Captain
	Alex Hales	England	3 January 1989 (age 36)	Right-handed	Right arm medium	Visa contract, injury replacement player for Marlon Samuels
	Daniel Harris	Australia	31 December 1979 (age 45)	Right-handed	Right arm medium	
	Michael Hill	Australia	29 September 1988 (age 36)	Left-handed	Right arm medium	
	Ben Rohrer	Australia	26 March 1981 (age 44)	Left-handed	–	Vice captain
All-rounders
	Faf du Plessis	South Africa	13 July 1984 (age 40)	Right-handed	Right arm leg break	Visa contract
	Aaron O'Brien	Australia	2 October 1981 (age 43)	Left-handed	Slow left-arm orthodox	
	Marlon Samuels	West Indies	5 February 1981 (age 44)	Right-handed	Right arm off break	Visa contract, replacement player for Faf du Plessis
	Will Sheridan	Australia	7 May 1987 (age 38)	Right-handed	Left arm fast medium	
Wicket-keepers
	Peter Nevill	Australia	13 October 1985 (age 39)	Right-handed	–	
Pace bowlers
	Brendan Drew	Australia	16 December 1983 (age 41)	Right-handed	Right arm fast medium	
	Jake Haberfield	Australia	18 June 1986 (age 38)	Right-handed	Right arm fast medium	
	Jayde Herrick	Australia	16 January 1985 (age 40)	Right-handed	Right arm fast medium	
	Darren Pattinson	England	2 August 1979 (age 45)	Right-handed	Right arm fast medium	Non-visa English international
	Nathan Rimmington	Australia	11 November 1982 (age 42)	Right-handed	Right arm fast medium	
Spin bowlers
	Fawad Ahmed	Australia	10 March 1979 (age 46)	Right-handed	Right arm leg break	
	James Muirhead	Australia	30 July 1993 (age 31)	Right-handed	Right arm leg break	
	Muttiah Muralitharan	Sri Lanka	17 April 1972 (age 53)	Right-handed	Right arm off break	Visa contract

== Season statistics ==
=== Home attendance ===
Game	Opponent	Attendance
1	Melbourne Stars	23,589
3	Hobart Hurricanes	7,951
4	Brisbane Heat	5,029
6	Adelaide Strikers	14,174
SF1	Brisbane Heat	16,285
Total Attendance		67,028
Average Attendance		13,406
