= 2023–24 Melbourne Renegades season =

Melbourne Renegades
2023–24 season
- Coach: David Saker
- Captain(s): Nic Maddinson
- Home ground: Marvel Stadium; GMHBA Stadium
- BBL season: 7th
- BBL finals: Did not qualify
- Leading Run Scorer: Jake Fraser-McGurk (257)
- Leading Wicket Taker: Tom Rogers (8)
- Player of the Season: Jake Fraser-McGurk
- Highest home attendance: 41,205 vs. Melbourne Stars at Marvel Stadium (13 January 2024)
- Lowest home attendance: 6,601 vs. Perth Scorchers at GMHBA Stadium (10 December 2023)
- Average home attendance: 18,251
- Club membership: 11,903

The 2023–24 Melbourne Renegades season is the thirteenth in the club's history. Coached by David Saker and captained by Nic Maddinson, they competed in the BBL's 2023–24 season.

== Summary ==
The club posted a record 11,903 members for the season.

== Squad information ==
=== Playing squad ===
The squad for the 2023–24 Big Bash League season is shown below.

- Players with international caps are listed in **bold**
- Ages are given as of 7 December 2023, the date of the first match played in the 2023–24 competition
- * denotes a player who is currently unavailable for selection.
- * denotes a player who is unavailable for rest of the season.

No.	Name	Nat.	Date of birth	Batting style	Bowling style	Notes
Batters
5	**Aaron Finch**	Australia	17 November 1986 (aged 37)	Right-handed	Slow left arm orthodox	
18	Harry Dixon	Australia	16 February 2005 (aged 18)	Left-handed	Right-arm off break	
23	Jake Fraser-McGurk	Australia	11 April 2002 (aged 21)	Right-handed	Right arm leg break	
3	Mackenzie Harvey	Australia	18 September 2000 (aged 23)	Left-handed	—	
53	**Nic Maddinson**	Australia	21 December 1991 (aged 31)	Left-handed	Slow left-arm orthodox	Captain
9	**Shaun Marsh**	Australia	9 July 1983 (aged 40)	Left-handed	Slow left arm orthodox	
29	Jonathan Wells	Australia	13 August 1988 (aged 35)	Right-handed	Right-arm medium	
All-rounders
69	Fergus O'Neill	Australia	27 January 2001 (aged 22)	Right-handed	Right-arm fast-medium	
12	Will Sutherland	Australia	27 October 1999 (aged 24)	Right-handed	Right arm fast medium	Vice captain
Wicketkeepers
10	Joe Clarke	England	26 May 1996 (aged 27)	Right-handed	—	Visa contract
77	Jordan Cox	England	21 October 2000 (aged 23)	Right-handed	—	Visa contract, replacement player for Quinton de Kock
13	**Quinton de Kock**	South Africa	17 December 1992 (aged 30)	Left-handed	—	Visa contract
–	**Scott Edwards**	Netherlands	23 August 1996 (age 29)	Right-handed	—	Replacement player for Joe Clarke
Pace bowlers
55	**Kane Richardson**	Australia	12 February 1991 (aged 32)	Right-handed	Right arm fast medium	
8	Tom Rogers	Australia	3 March 1994 (aged 29)	Left-handed	Right arm fast-medium	
64	**Peter Siddle**	Australia	25 November 1984 (aged 39)	Right-handed	Right-arm fast-medium	
Spin bowlers
21	**Akeal Hosein**	West Indies	25 April 1993 (age 33)	Left-handed	Left-arm orthodox	Visa contract, replacement player for Mujeeb Ur Rahman
4	Ruwantha Kellepotha	Sri Lanka	13 July 1991 (aged 32)	Right-handed	Right-arm leg-spin	
67	**Nathan Lyon**	Australia	20 December 1987 (aged 35)	Right-handed	Right arm off break	
7	**Mujeeb Ur Rahman**	Afghanistan	28 March 2001 (aged 22)	Right-handed	Right-arm off break	Visa contract
88	**Adam Zampa**	Australia	31 March 1992 (aged 31)	Right-handed	Right-arm leg break	

=== Coaching staff ===
The administration and support staff of the Melbourne Renegades for the 2023–24 Big Bash League season as of 23 November 2023.

Position	Name
Head coach	David Saker
List manager	Andrew Lynch
Assistant coach	Simon Helmot
Assistant coach	Ian Bell
Assistant coach	Andre Borovec
Bowling coach	Michael Lewis
Strength & Conditioning oach	Richard Johnson
Physiotherapist	Nick Adcock

== Regular season ==
=== League table ===
Pos	Team	Pld	W	L	NR	Pts	NRR	Qualification
1	Brisbane Heat (C)	10	7	1	2	16	0.972	Advanced to Qualifier
2	Sydney Sixers	10	6	2	2	14	0.339	Advanced to Qualifier
3	Perth Scorchers	10	6	3	1	13	0.725	Advanced to Knockout
4	Adelaide Strikers	10	5	4	1	11	0.331	Advanced to Knockout
5	Hobart Hurricanes	10	4	6	0	8	−0.268	
6	Melbourne Stars	10	4	6	0	8	−1.051	
7	Melbourne Renegades	10	2	6	2	6	−0.289	
8	Sydney Thunder	10	1	7	2	4	−0.652	

Source: ESPNcricinfo
(C) Champions

=== Result by round ===
Round	1	2	3	4	5	6	7	8	9	10
Ground	A	H	H	A	A	H	A	H	H	A
Result	L	NR	L	L	L	W	L	L	W	NR
Position	6	3	5	7	8	7	7	8	7	7

Updated to match(es) played on 12 December 2023. Source: Big Bash League
A = Away; H = Home; W = Win; L = Loss; NR = No result

=== Matches ===
Match 2
8 December 2023
19:15 (N)
Scorecard

(H) Sydney Sixers; 6/175 (20 overs)	v	Melbourne Renegades; 7/167 (20 overs)
Steve Smith 61 (42); Will Sutherland 2/21 (4 overs)		Will Sutherland 51* (30); Ben Dwarshuis 3/36 (4 overs)

Sydney Sixers won by 8 runs
Sydney Cricket Ground, Sydney
Attendance: 13,089
Umpires: Bruce Oxenford and Michael Graham-Smith
Player of the match: Steve Smith (Sydney Sixers)

- Melbourne Renegades won the toss and elected to field.

Match 4
10 December 2023
19:15 (N)
Scorecard

Perth Scorchers; 2/30 (6.5 overs)	v	Melbourne Renegades (H)
Aaron Hardie 20* (23); Tom Rogers 1/7 (2 overs)

No result
GMHBA Stadium, Geelong
Attendance: 6,601
Umpires: Simon Lightbody and Ben Treloar

- Melbourne Renegades won the toss and elected to field.
- Match abandoned due to unsafe pitch.

Match 10
21 December 2023
19:15 (N)
Scorecard

(H) Melbourne Renegades; 8/162 (20 overs)	v	Brisbane Heat; 4/163 (18.1 overs)
Jake Fraser-McGurk 55 (23); Paul Walter 3/27 (4 overs)		Matt Renshaw 49* (37); Mujeeb Ur Rahman 2/27 (4 overs)

Brisbane Heat won by 6 wickets
Marvel Stadium, Melbourne
Attendance: 14,893
Umpires: Phillip Gillespie and Claire Polosak
Player of the match: Paul Walter (Brisbane Heat)

- Brisbane Heat won the toss and elected to field.

Match 13
23 December 2023
19:15 (N)
Scorecard

Melbourne Renegades; 5/183 (20 overs)	v	Hobart Hurricanes (H); 4/187 (19 overs)
Jonathan Wells 40* (24); Nathan Ellis 2/32 (4 overs); Patrick Dooley 2/32 (4 overs)		Matthew Wade 82 (50); Tom Rogers 2/32 (4 overs)

Hobart Hurricanes won by 6 wickets
Blundstone Arena, Hobart
Attendance: 8,186
Umpires: Sam Nogajski and Simon Lightbody
Player of the match: Matthew Wade (Hobart Hurricanes)

- Hobart Hurricanes won the toss and elected to field.

Match 15
26 December 2023
18:15 (N)
Scorecard

(H) Perth Scorchers; 162 (19.4 overs)	v	Melbourne Renegades; 8/149 (20 overs)
Josh Inglis 64 (44); Tom Rogers 3/18 (4 overs)		Shaun Marsh 59 (36); Andrew Tye 2/21 (4 overs)

Perth Scorchers won by 13 runs
Optus Stadium, Perth
Attendance: 42,226
Umpires: Shawn Craig and Greg Davidson
Player of the match: Josh Inglis (Perth Scorchers)

- Melbourne Renegades won the toss and elected to field.

Match 18
29 December 2023
19:15 (N)
Scorecard

Adelaide Strikers; 6/177 (20 overs)	v	Melbourne Renegades (H); 6/178 (18.4 overs)
Chris Lynn 56 (34); Mujeeb Ur Rahman 3/20 (4 overs)		Jake Fraser-McGurk 70 (37); David Payne 3/37 (3.4 overs)

Melbourne Renegades won by 4 wickets
Marvel Stadium, Melbourne
Attendance: 15,449
Umpires: Gerard Abood and Bruce Oxenford
Player of the match: Jake Fraser-McGurk (Melbourne Renegades)

- Adelaide Strikers won the toss and elected to bat.

Match 23
2 January 2024
19:15 (N)
Scorecard

Melbourne Renegades; 7/97 (14 overs)	v	Melbourne Stars (H); 2/98 (12 overs)
Quinton de Kock 23 (16); Dan Lawrence 2/8 (2 overs)		Thomas Rogers 42* (34); Tom Rogers 1/21 (3 overs)

Melbourne Stars won by 8 wickets
Melbourne Cricket Ground, Melbourne
Attendance: 27,024
Umpires: Michael Graham-Smith and Sam Nogajski
Player of the match: Glenn Maxwell (Melbourne Stars)

- Melbourne Stars won the toss and elected to field.
- Match reduced to 14 overs per side due to rain.

Match 26
4 January 2024
19:15 (N)
Scorecard

(H) Melbourne Renegades; 4/147 (20 overs)	v	Hobart Hurricanes; 4/148 (18.4 overs)
Jordan Cox 47 (36); Tim David 1/0 (1 over)		Sam Hain 51 (36); Fergus O'Neill 2/25 (4 overs)

Hobart Hurricanes won by 6 wickets
Marvel Stadium, Melbourne
Attendance: 13,107
Umpires: Bruce Oxenford and Eloise Sheridan
Player of the match: Sam Hain (Hobart Hurricanes)

- Hobart Hurricanes won the toss and elected to field.

Match 36
13 January 2024
19:30 (N)
Scorecard

Melbourne Stars; 8/137 (20 overs)	v	Melbourne Renegades (H); 4/139 (17.2 overs)
Hilton Cartwright 38 (30); Kane Richardson 2/17 (4 overs)		Shaun Marsh 64* (49); Nathan Coulter-Nile 2/25 (4 overs)

Melbourne Renegades won by 6 wickets
Marvel Stadium, Melbourne
Attendance: 41,205
Umpires: Greg Davidson and Gerard Abood
Player of the match: Shaun Marsh (Melbourne Renegades)

- Melbourne Renegades won the toss and elected to field.

Match 40
17 January 2024
19:15 AEDT (N)
Scorecard

(H) Sydney Thunder	v	Melbourne Renegades

No result
Sydney Showground Stadium, Sydney
Attendance: –
Umpires: Michael Graham-Smith and Ben Treloar

- No toss.
- Match abandoned without a ball bowled due to weather.

== Attendances ==
Match	Teams	Date	Venue	Location	Attendance	Capacity % (Note: Based on general venue capacity, which will vary depending on cricket capacity.)
2	Sydney Sixers vs Melbourne Renegades	8 December 2023	Sydney Cricket Ground	Sydney	13,089	27%
4	Melbourne Renegades vs Perth Scorchers	10 December 2023	GMHBA Stadium	Geelong	6,601	18%
10	Melbourne Renegades vs Brisbane Heat	21 December 2023	Marvel Stadium	Melbourne	14,893	26%
13	Hobart Hurricanes vs Melbourne Renegades	23 December 2023	Blundstone Arena	Hobart	8,186	42%
15	Perth Scorchers vs Melbourne Renegades	26 December 2023	Optus Stadium	Perth	42,226	69%
18	Melbourne Renegades vs Adelaide Strikers	29 December 2023	Marvel Stadium	Melbourne	15,449	33%
23	Melbourne Stars vs Melbourne Renegades	2 January 2024	Melbourne Cricket Ground	Melbourne	27,024	27%
26	Melbourne Renegades vs Hobart Hurricanes	4 January 2024	Marvel Stadium	Melbourne	13,107	28%
36	Melbourne Renegades vs Melbourne Stars	13 January 2024	Marvel Stadium	Melbourne	41,205	88%
40	Sydney Thunder vs Melbourne Renegades	17 January 2024	Sydney Showground Stadium	Sydney		
Home Average					18,251	39%
Home Total					91,255	—
Overall Average						%
Overall Total						—

- denotes home matches.
