= 2014–15 Melbourne Renegades season =

Melbourne Renegades
2014–15 season
- President: James Brayshaw
- Coach: Simon Helmot
- Captain(s): Aaron Finch
- Home ground: Etihad Stadium
- BBL Season: 6th
- BBL Finals: DNQ
- Leading Run Scorer: Matthew Wade (168)
- Leading Wicket Taker: James Pattinson and Shakib Al Hasan (7)
- Player of the Season: James Pattinson
- Highest home attendance: 33,430
- Lowest home attendance: 16,481
- Average home attendance: 22,301
- Club membership: 5,510

The 2014–15 Melbourne Renegades season was the fourth in the club's history. Coached by Simon Helmot and captained by Aaron Finch, they are competed in the BBL's 2014–15 season.

== Summary ==
Similarly to the previous season, the Renegades headed into the 2014–15 Big Bash League season with confidence after signing Matthew Wade and Callum Ferguson in the pre-season, but failed to qualify for the finals yet again, finishing 6th. The poor run from the previous season resulted in the coach Simon Helmot being sacked.

== Squad ==
S/N	Name	Nationality	Date of birth (age)	Batting style	Bowling style	Notes
Batsmen
5	Aaron Finch	Australia	17 November 1986 (age 39)	Right-handed	Left arm orthodox	Captain
26	Tom Cooper	Netherlands	26 November 1986 (age 39)	Right-handed	Right arm off spin	Non-visa Dutch international
–	Lega Siaka	Papua New Guinea	21 December 1992 (age 32)	Right-handed	Right arm leg spin	Community rookie contract
12	Callum Ferguson	Australia	21 November 1984 (age 41)	Right-handed	Right arm medium	
14	Alex Doolan	Australia	29 November 1985 (age 40)	Right-handed	Right arm medium	
99	Ben Rohrer	Australia	26 March 1981 (age 44)	Left-handed	–	Vice captain
–	Jesse Ryder	New Zealand	6 August 1984 (age 41)	Left-handed	Right arm medium	Visa contract
6	Tom Beaton	Australia	28 November 1990 (age 35)	Right-handed	Right arm medium	
All-rounders
75	Shakib Al Hasan	Bangladesh	24 March 1987 (age 38)	Left-handed	Slow left-arm orthodox	Visa contract, replacement player for Dwayne Bravo
47	Dwayne Bravo	West Indies	7 October 1983 (age 42)	Right-Handed	Right arm fast medium	Visa contract
7	Andre Russell	West Indies	29 April 1988 (age 37)	Right-handed	Right arm fast medium	Visa contract, injury replacement player for Jesse Ryder
9	Matthew Short	Australia	8 November 1995 (age 30)	Right-handed	Right arm off spin	
38	Ben Stokes	England	4 June 1991 (age 34)	Left-handed	Right arm fast medium	Visa contract, replacement player for Andre Russell
Wicketkeepers
13	Matthew Wade	Australia	26 December 1987 (age 37)	Left-handed	Right arm medium	
20	Peter Nevill	Australia	13 October 1985 (age 40)	Right-handed	-	
Pace bowlers
10	Peter Siddle	Australia	25 November 1984 (age 41)	Right-handed	Right arm fast medium	
19	James Pattinson	Australia	3 May 1990 (age 35)	Left-handed	Right arm fast	
35	Nathan Rimmington	Australia	11 November 1982 (age 43)	Right-handed	Right arm fast medium	
28	Jayde Herrick	Australia	16 January 1985 (age 40)	Right-handed	Right-arm fast medium	
17	Andrew Fekete	Australia	18 May 1985 (age 40)	Right-handed	Right-arm fast	Injury replacement player for Jayde Herrick
44	Nicholas Winter	Australia	19 June 1993 (age 32)	Left-handed	Left arm fast medium	
–	Ben Ashkenazi	Australia	5 October 1994 (age 31)	Left-handed	Right-arm medium	Development rookie contract
Spin bowlers
23	Fawad Ahmed	Australia	5 February 1982 (age 43)	Right-handed	Right arm leg spin	
11	Aaron O'Brien	Australia	2 October 1981 (age 44)	Left-handed	Left-arm orthodox	

== Fixtures ==
=== Pre-season ===
14 December
12:00
Scorecard

(H) Melbourne Renegades; 5/164 (20 overs)	v	Premier Cricket All Stars; 5/127 (20 overs)
Aaron Finch 93 (60); Jake Haberfield 2/27 (4 overs)		Hayden Butterworth 37* (32); Fawad Ahmed 2/22 (4 overs)

Melbourne Renegades won by 37 runs
Merv Hughes Oval, Footscray
Attendance: 1,500
Umpires: D Brigham and A Sammartino

- Melbourne Renegades won the toss and elected to bat

=== Regular season ===
19 December
19:40 (D/N)
Scorecard

Melbourne Renegades; 7/154 (20 overs)	v	Sydney Sixers (H); 2/158 (18.5 overs)
Callum Ferguson 40 (32); Sean Abbott 2/20 (4 overs)		Nic Maddinson 84* (54); Nathan Rimmington 1/22 (3 overs)

Sydney Sixers won by 8 wickets
Sydney Cricket Ground
Attendance: 12,789
Umpires: Ashley Barrow and Damien Mealey
Player of the match: Nic Maddinson (Sydney Sixers)

- Sydney Sixers won the toss and elected to field
- Ben Dwarshuis (Sixers) made his Twenty20 debut

26 December
16:10 (D/N)
Scorecard

(H) Perth Scorchers; 3/192 (20 overs)	v	Melbourne Renegades; 9/157 (20 overs)
Michael Klinger 105* (60); Matthew Short 1/26 (3 overs)		Andre Russell 43 (21); Jason Behrendorff 2/16 (4 overs)

Perth Scorchers won by 35 runs
#TheFurnace, Perth
Attendance: 18,207
Umpires: Mick Martell and Gerard Abood
Player of the match: Michael Klinger (Perth Scorchers)

- Perth Scorchers won the toss and elected to bat
- Matt Dixon (Scorchers), Nicholas Winter and Matthew Short (both Renegades) made their Twenty20 debuts

30 December
19:10 (D/N)
Scorecard

Sydney Thunder; 6/114 (20 overs)	v	Melbourne Renegades (H); 2/118 (13.5 overs)
Daniel Hughes 40* (35); James Pattinson 3/24 (4 overs)		Aaron Finch 48 (37); Dirk Nannes 1/18 (2 overs)

Melbourne Renegades won by 8 wickets
Etihad Stadium, Melbourne
Attendance: 22,108
Umpires: Ashley Barrow and Rod Tucker
Player of the match: James Pattinson (Melbourne Renegades)

- Melbourne Renegades won the toss and elected to field

3 January
19:10 (D/N)
Scorecard

Melbourne Stars; 6/169 (20 overs)	v	Melbourne Renegades (H); 57 (12.4 overs)
Luke Wright 39 (21); Dwayne Bravo 3/22 (3 overs)		Tom Cooper 10 (15); Scott Boland 2/10 (2 overs)

Melbourne Stars won by 112 runs
Etihad Stadium, Melbourne
Attendance: 33,430
Umpires: Geoff Joshua and Paul Wilson
Player of the match: Michael Beer (Melbourne Stars)

- Melbourne Renegades won the toss and elected to field
- Melbourne Renegades score of 57 was the lowest score in BBL history

7 January
19:10 (D/N)
Scorecard

Melbourne Renegades; 7/163 (20 overs)	v	Hobart Hurricanes (H); 126 (19.2 overs)
Ben Stokes 77* (37); Ben Hilfenhaus 3/32 (4 overs)		George Bailey 20 (24); Nicholas Winter 3/19 (3.2 overs)

Melbourne Renegades won by 37 runs
Bellerive Oval, Hobart
Attendance: 13,918
Umpires: John Ward and Shawn Craig
Player of the match: Ben Stokes (Melbourne Renegades)

- Hobart Hurricanes won the toss and elected to field

10 January
19:10 (D/N)
Scorecard

Melbourne Renegades; 6/153 (20 overs)	v	Melbourne Stars (H); 7/154 (20 overs)
Matthew Wade 71 (49); James Faulkner 3/19 (3 overs)		Glenn Maxwell 66 (44); Ben Stokes 2/22 (2 overs)

Melbourne Stars won by 3 wickets
Melbourne Cricket Ground
Attendance: 37,323
Umpires: Mick Martell and Shawn Craig
Player of the match: Glenn Maxwell (Melbourne Stars)

- Melbourne Renegades won the toss and elected to bat

13 January
19:10 (D/N)
Scorecard

Brisbane Heat; 80 (17.3 overs)	v	Melbourne Renegades (H); 5/81 (14 overs)
Ben Cutting 30 (35); Shakib Al Hasan 4/13 (4 overs)		Tom Beaton 31* (16); Dan Christian 2/13 (4 overs)

Melbourne Renegades won by 5 wickets
Etihad Stadium, Melbourne
Attendance: 17,276
Umpires: Geoff Joshua and John Ward
Player of the match: Shakib Al Hasan (Melbourne Renegades)

- Melbourne Renegades won the toss and elected to field

19 January
19:10 (D/N)
Scorecard

Adelaide Strikers; 5/166 (20 overs)	v	Melbourne Renegades (H); 7/144 (20 overs)
Travis Head 71 (34); Nathan Rimmington 2/40 (3 overs)		Ben Stokes 33 (19); Ben Laughlin 2/24 (3 overs)

Adelaide Strikers won by 22 runs
Etihad Stadium, Melbourne
Attendance: 16,481
Umpires: Gerard Abood and Greg Davidson
Player of the match: Travis Head (Adelaide Strikers)

- Adelaide Strikers won the toss and elected to bat
- Kelvin Smith (Strikers) made his Twenty20 debut

== Ladder ==
Pos	Team	Pld	W	L	NR	Pts	NRR	Qualification
1	Adelaide Strikers	8	6	1	1	13	1.159	Advanced to semi-finals
2	Perth Scorchers (C)	8	5	3	0	10	0.705	Advanced to semi-finals
3	Melbourne Stars	8	5	3	0	10	0.336	Advanced to semi-finals
4	Sydney Sixers	8	5	3	0	10	−0.014	Advanced to semi-finals
5	Hobart Hurricanes	8	3	5	0	6	−0.280	
6	Melbourne Renegades	8	3	5	0	6	−0.331	
7	Sydney Thunder	8	2	5	1	5	−0.485	
8	Brisbane Heat	8	2	6	0	4	−1.116	

(C) Champions

=== Ladder progress ===
Round	1	2	3	4	5	6	7	8
Ground	A	A	H	H	A	A	H	H
Result	L	L	W	L	W	L	W	L
Position	6	6	4	8	7	7	5	6

Source: Competitive Matches
A = Away; H = Home; W = Win; D = Draw; L = Lose

== Season statistics ==
=== Home attendance ===
Match	Opponent	Attendance
3	Sydney Thunder	22,018
4	Melbourne Stars	33,430
7	Brisbane Heat	17,276
8	Adelaide Strikers	16,481
Total Attendance		89,205
Average Attendance		22,301
