= 2015–16 Melbourne Renegades season =

Melbourne Renegades
2015–16 season
- Coach: David Saker
- Captain(s): Aaron Finch
- Home ground: Etihad Stadium
- BBL Season: 5th
- BBL Finals: DNQ
- Leading Run Scorer: Chris Gayle (260)
- Leading Wicket Taker: Nathan Rimmington (7)
- Highest home attendance: 43,176 vs Melbourne Stars (9 January 2016)
- Lowest home attendance: 20,850 vs Sydney Sixers (23 December 2015)
- Average home attendance: 29,010

The 2015–16 Melbourne Renegades season was the fifth in the club's history. Coached by David Saker and captained by Aaron Finch, they competed in the BBL's 2015–16 season.

== Summary ==
David Saker was unveiled as the new coach for the Renegades in the 2015–16 Big Bash League season. The Renegades also signed experienced players Cameron White, Xavier Doherty and Chris Gayle to strengthen their squad.

== Fixtures ==
=== Pre-season ===
11 December (D/N)
Report

Melbourne Renegades; 8/144 (20 overs)	v	Melbourne Stars; 4/147 (17.3 overs)

Melbourne Stars won by 6 wickets
Simonds Stadium, Geelong
Attendance: 10,023

13 December
Report

Melbourne Renegades; 7/146 (20 overs)	v	Victorian Invitational XI; 97

Melbourne Renegades won by 49 runs
Merv Hughes Oval, Footscray

=== Regular season ===
19 December
18:10 (D/N)
Scorecard

(H) Brisbane Heat; 5/180 (20 overs)	v	Melbourne Renegades; 3/184 (19.3 overs)
Chris Lynn 35 (20); Xavier Doherty 2/29 (4 overs)		Aaron Finch 65 (45); Andrew Fekete 2/44 (4 overs)

Melbourne Renegades won by 7 wickets
The Gabba
Attendance: 26,245
Umpires: Ashley Barrow and Sam Nogajski
Player of the match: Aaron Finch (Renegades)

- Brisbane Heat won the toss and elected to bat.
- Guy Walker (Renegades) made his T20 debut.

23 December
19:10 (D/N)
Scorecard

(H) Melbourne Renegades; 4/172 (20 overs)	v	Sydney Sixers; 7/174 (18.5 overs)
Chris Gayle 46 (33); Johan Botha 1/13 (2 overs)		Michael Lumb 63 (35); Nathan Rimmington 4/26 (4 overs)

Sydney Sixers won by 3 wickets
Etihad Stadium
Attendance: 20,850
Umpires: Simon Fry and Sam Nogajski
Player of the match: Michael Lumb (Sixers)

- Sydney Sixers won the toss and elected to field.
- Cameron Stevenson (Renegades) made his T20 debut.

30 December
19:10 (D/N)
Scorecard

(H) Melbourne Renegades; 4/170 (20 overs)	v	Perth Scorchers; 0/171 (18.4 overs)
Aaron Finch 72 (48); Jason Behrendorff 2/14 (4 overs)		Michael Klinger 90* (58)

Perth Scorchers won by 10 wickets
Etihad Stadium
Attendance: 26,787
Umpires: Gerard Abood and Phillip Gillespie
Player of the match: Michael Klinger (Scorchers)

- Perth Scorchers won the toss and elected to field.
- This was the first ever 10-wicket win in a BBL match.
- The crowd of 26,787 is the highest crowd at Etihad Stadium for a non-derby BBL match.
- Michael Klinger and Shaun Marsh's unbeaten 171-run partnership is the highest partnership for the Scorchers in their history and the second highest overall.

2 January
18:10 (D/N)
Scorecard

Melbourne Renegades; 7/161 (20 overs)	v	Melbourne Stars (H); 3/163 (19.1 overs)
Cameron White 54 (39); John Hastings 4/29 (4 overs)		Luke Wright 109* (63); Chris Tremain 1/22 (4 overs)

Melbourne Stars won by 7 wickets
Melbourne Cricket Ground
Attendance: 80,883
Umpires: Shawn Craig and Sam Nogajski
Player of the match: Luke Wright (Stars)

- Melbourne Stars won the toss and elected to field.
- The crowd of 80,883 is the highest ever recorded attendance for a domestic cricket match.

4 January
19:40 (D/N)
Scorecard

(H) Hobart Hurricanes; 5/140 (20 overs)	v	Melbourne Renegades; 5/144 (14 overs)
Daniel Christian 58 (40); Xavier Doherty 2/19 (3 overs)		Aaron Finch 60 (39); Cameron Boyce 3/34 (4 overs)

Melbourne Renegades won by 5 wickets
Blundstone Arena
Attendance: 16,412
Umpires: Sam Nogajski and Paul Wilson
Player of the match: Chris Tremain (Renegades)

- Melbourne Renegades won the toss and elected to field.

9 January
19:10 (D/N)
Scorecard

(H) Melbourne Renegades; 6/155 (20 overs)	v	Melbourne Stars; 2/156 (18 overs)
Dwayne Bravo 59* (37); Marcus Stoinis 3/11 (2 overs)		Kevin Pietersen 67* (43); Cameron Stevenson 1/28 (3 overs)

Melbourne Stars won by 8 wickets
Etihad Stadium
Attendance: 43,176
Umpires: Geoff Joshua and Mick Martell
Player of the match: Marcus Stoinis (Stars)

- Melbourne Stars won the toss and elected to field.
- Aaron Ayre (Renegades) made his T20 debut.
- The crowd of 43,176 is the highest at Etihad Stadium for a cricket match.

11 January
19:40 (D/N)
Scorecard

(H) Sydney Thunder; 5/173 (20 overs)	v	Melbourne Renegades; 5/176 (19.2 overs)
Usman Khawaja 62 (42); Dwayne Bravo 2/26 (4 overs)		Cameron White 61 (46); Andre Russell 2/42 (4 overs)

Melbourne Renegades won by 5 wickets
Spotless Stadium
Attendance: 18,602
Umpires: Gerard Abood and Shawn Craig
Player of the match: Cameron White (Renegades)

- Sydney Thunder won the toss and elected to bat.

18 January
19:40 (D/N)
Scorecard

Adelaide Strikers; 5/170 (20 overs)	v	Melbourne Renegades (H); 143 (15.3 overs)
Tim Ludeman 49 (41); Xavier Doherty 2/30 (4 overs)		Chris Gayle 56 (17); Travis Head 3/16 (2 overs)

Adelaide Strikers won by 27 runs
Etihad Stadium
Attendance: 25,227
Umpires: Gerard Abood and Shawn Craig
Player of the match: Travis Head (Strikers)

- Melbourne Renegades won the toss and elected to field.
- Chris Gayle (Renegades) equaled the world record for the fastest fifty in a T20 match (12 balls).

== Ladder ==
Pos	Team	Pld	W	L	NR	Pts	NRR	Qualification
1	Adelaide Strikers	8	7	1	0	14	0.544	Advanced to semi-finals
2	Melbourne Stars	8	5	3	0	10	0.366	Advanced to semi-finals
3	Perth Scorchers	8	5	3	0	10	0.181	Advanced to semi-finals
4	Sydney Thunder (C)	8	4	4	0	8	0.375	Advanced to semi-finals
5	Melbourne Renegades	8	3	5	0	6	−0.041	
6	Brisbane Heat	8	3	5	0	6	−0.204	
7	Hobart Hurricanes	8	3	5	0	6	−0.955	
8	Sydney Sixers	8	2	6	0	4	−0.330	

(C) Champions

=== Ladder progress ===
Round	1	2	3	4	5	6	7	8
Ground	A	H	H	A	A	H	A	H
Result	W	L	L	L	W	L	W	L
Position	4	4	7	7	6	6	4	5

Source: Competitive Matches
A = Away; H = Home; W = Win; D = Draw; L = Lose

== Squad information ==
The following is the Renegades men squad for the 2015–16 Big Bash League season as of 31 December 2015.

No.	Name	Nationality	Date of birth (age)	Batting style	Bowling style	Notes
Batsmen
5	Aaron Finch	Australia	17 November 1986 (age 39)	Right-handed	Left arm orthodox	Captain
6	Tom Beaton	Australia	28 November 1990 (age 35)	Right-handed	Right arm medium	
26	Tom Cooper	Netherlands	26 November 1986 (age 39)	Right-handed	Right arm off spin	Non-visa Dutch international
12	Callum Ferguson	Australia	21 November 1984 (age 41)	Right-handed	Right arm medium	
9	Matt Short	Australia	8 November 1995 (age 30)	Right-handed	Right arm off spin	
7	Cameron White	Australia	18 August 1983 (age 43)	Right-handed	Right arm leg break	
28	Ben McDermott	Australia	12 December 1994 (age 31)	Right-handed	Right arm medium	Injury replacement player for Callum Ferguson
All-rounders
47	Dwayne Bravo	West Indies	7 October 1983 (age 42)	Right-handed	Right arm fast medium	Visa contract
333	Chris Gayle	West Indies	21 September 1979 (age 46)	Left-handed	Right arm off spin	Visa contract
3	Cameron Stevenson	Australia	30 October 1992 (age 33)	Right-handed	Right arm fast medium	Replacement player for James Pattinson
Wicketkeepers
20	Peter Nevill	Australia	13 October 1985 (age 40)	Right-handed	–	
13	Matthew Wade	Australia	26 December 1987 (age 38)	Left-handed	Right arm medium	
–	Aaron Ayre	Australia	6 August 1992 (age 34)	Left-handed	–	Replacement player for Matthew Wade
Pace bowlers
19	James Pattinson	Australia	3 May 1990 (age 36)	Left-handed	Right arm fast	
35	Nathan Rimmington	Australia	11 November 1982 (age 43)	Right-handed	Right arm fast medium	
10	Peter Siddle	Australia	25 November 1984 (age 41)	Right-handed	Right arm fast medium	
14	Chris Tremain	Australia	10 August 1991 (age 35)	Right-handed	Right arm fast medium	
4	Guy Walker	Australia	12 September 1995 (age 30)	Right-handed	Right arm fast medium	
44	Nick Winter	Australia	19 June 1993 (age 33)	Left-handed	Left arm fast medium	
21	Cameron Gannon	Australia	23 January 1989 (age 37)	Right-handed	Right arm fast medium	Injury replacement player for Nick Winter
–	Tom O'Donnell	Australia	23 October 1996 (age 29)	Right-handed	Left arm medium	Development rookie contract
Spin bowlers
24	Xavier Doherty	Australia	22 November 1982 (age 43)	Left-handed	Left-arm orthodox	
43	Nathan Hauritz	Australia	18 October 1981 (age 44)	Right-handed	Right arm off spin	
–	Gehan Seneviratne	Australia				Community rookie contract

== Season statistics ==
=== Most runs ===
Player	Mat	Inns	Runs	Ave	SR	HS	100	50
Chris Gayle	8	8	260	32.50	155.68	56	0	1
Aaron Finch	5	5	246	49.20	143.02	72	0	3
Cameron White	8	8	235	33.57	119.28	61	0	3
Dwayne Bravo	8	8	201	50.25	164.75	59*	0	1
Tom Beaton	8	7	96	19.20	154.83	41*	0	0

Source: ESPNcricinfo, 24 January 2016

=== Most wickets ===
Player	Mat	Inns	Wkts	Ave	Econ	BBI	SR
Nathan Rimmington	7	7	7	32.14	8.33	4/26	23.1
Xavier Doherty	7	7	6	36.83	8.84	2/19	25.0
Chris Tremain	8	8	6	42.66	7.78	2/48	32.0
Dwayne Bravo	8	8	6	18.00	8.04	2/26	31.8
Cameron Gannon	6	6	4	45.75	8.25	2/31	33.2

Source: ESPNcricinfo, 24 January 2016.

=== Home attendance ===
Match	Opponent	Attendance
2	Sydney Sixers	20,850
3	Perth Scorchers	26,787
6	Melbourne Stars	43,176
8	Adelaide Strikers	25,227
Total Attendance		116,040
Average Attendance		29,010

=== TV audience ===
Match No	Teams	Average TV Ratings			
Match No	Teams	National		5 metro cities	
Match No	Teams	Session 1	Session 2	Session 1	Session 2
1	Brisbane Heat vs Melbourne Renegades	843,000	1,100,000	642,000	853,000
2	Melbourne Renegades vs Sydney Sixers	864,000	1,160,000	603,000	847,000
3	Melbourne Renegades vs Perth Scorchers	917,000	1,170,000	677,000	864,000
4	Melbourne Stars vs Melbourne Renegades	852,000	1,260,000	621,000	880,000
5	Hobart Hurricanes vs Melbourne Renegades	1,160,000	1,250,000	857,000	983,000
6	Melbourne Renegades vs Melbourne Stars	841,000	1,070,000	599,000	777,000
7	Sydney Thunder vs Melbourne Renegades	1,210,000	1,240,000	868,000	904,000
8	Melbourne Renegades vs Adelaide Strikers	1,110,000	1,360,000	820,000	1,020,000
Total		7,797,000	9,610,000	5,687,000	7,128,000
Average		1,087,938		800,938	
