= 2016–17 Melbourne Renegades season =

Australian cricket team results

Melbourne Renegades
2016–17 season
- Coach: Andrew McDonald
- Captain(s): Aaron Finch
- Home ground: Etihad Stadium
- BBL Season: 5th
- BBL Finals: DNQ
- Leading Run Scorer: Aaron Finch (354)
- Leading Wicket Taker: Sunil Narine (13)
- Highest home attendance: 44,189 vs Melbourne Stars (7 January 2017)
- Lowest home attendance: 23,015 vs Sydney Thunder (22 December 2016)
- Average home attendance: 30,033

The 2016–17 Melbourne Renegades season was the sixth in the club's history. Coached by Andrew McDonald and captained by Aaron Finch, they competed in the BBL's 2016–17 season.

== Fixtures ==
=== Pre-season ===
19 December 2016
Scorecard

Melbourne Renegades; 6/164 (20 overs)	v	Melbourne Stars; 2/165 (15.3 overs)

Melbourne Stars won by 8 wickets
Merv Hughes Oval, Footscray

=== Regular season ===
22 December
19:40 (D/N)
Scorecard

(H) Melbourne Renegades; 7/179 (20 overs)	v	Sydney Thunder; 130 (19.1 overs)
Aaron Finch 63 (37); Andre Russell 2/42 (4 overs)		Ryan Gibson 39 (37); Brad Hogg 2/22 (4 overs)

Melbourne Renegades won by 49 runs
Etihad Stadium
Attendance: 23,015
Umpires: Gerard Abood and Simon Fry
Player of the match: Aaron Finch (Renegades)

- Sydney Thunder won the toss and elected to field.
- Arjun Nair (Thunder) made his T20 debut.

29 December
19:10 (D/N)
Scorecard

(H) Melbourne Renegades; 8/148 (20 overs)	v	Perth Scorchers; 6/152 (20 overs)
Cameron White 37 (29); David Willey 2/15 (3 overs)		Michael Klinger 72 (55); Sunil Narine 2/20 (4 overs)

Perth Scorchers won by 4 wickets
Etihad Stadium
Attendance: 26,112
Umpires: Greg Davidson and Mick Martell
Player of the match: Michael Klinger (Scorchers)

- Perth Scorchers won the toss and elected to field.

1 January
18:10 (D/N)
Scorecard

Melbourne Renegades; 4/171 (20 overs)	v	Melbourne Stars (H); 9/151 (18 overs)
Cameron White 64* (43); James Faulkner 1/19 (4 overs)		Luke Wright 45 (40); Brad Hogg 3/22 (4 overs)

Melbourne Renegades won by 7 runs (D/L)
Melbourne Cricket Ground
Attendance: 71,162
Umpires: Shawn Craig and Geoff Joshua
Player of the match: Brad Hogg (Renegades)

- Melbourne Stars won the toss and elected to field.
- Rain reduced the Stars innings to 18 overs with a revised target of 159.

7 January
19:10 (D/N)
Scorecard

(H) Melbourne Renegades; 9/154 (20 overs)	v	Melbourne Stars; 7/200 (20 overs)
Cameron White 38 (29); Adam Zampa 3/19 (4 overs)		Kevin Pieterson 73 (46); James Pattinson 3/44 (4 overs)

Melbourne Stars won by 46 runs
Etihad Stadium
Attendance: 44,189
Umpires: Geoff Joshua and Sam Nogajski
Player of the match: Adam Zampa (Stars)

- Melbourne Renegades won the toss and chose to field
- 44,189 is the highest attendance for a cricket match at the Etihad Stadium

9 January
19:40 (D/N)
Scorecard

Melbourne Renegades; 6/170 (20 overs)	v	Sydney Sixers (H); 4/171 (19.3 overs)
Aaron Finch 57 (44); Ben Dwarshuis 3/35 (4 overs)		Daniel Hughes 41 (29); Thisara Perera 2/26 (4 overs)

Sydney Sixers won by 6 wickets
Sydney Cricket Ground
Attendance: 30,702
Umpires: Shawn Craig and Tony Wilds
Player of the match: Brad Haddin (Sixers)

- Melbourne Renegades won the toss and elected to bat.
- The crowd of 30,702 is the highest crowd for a non-derby BBL match at the SCG.

12 January
19:40 (D/N)
Scorecard

(H) Melbourne Renegades; 4/222 (20 overs)	v	Hobart Hurricanes; 8/223 (20 overs)
Aaron Finch 63 (40); Jake Reed 2/54 (4 overs)		Ben McDermott 114 (52); Sunil Narine 3/27 (4 overs)

Hobart Hurricanes won by 2 wickets
Etihad Stadium
Attendance: 26,816
Umpires: Phillip Gillespie and Paul Wilson
Player of the match: Ben McDermott (Hurricanes)

- Hobart Hurricanes won the toss and elected to field.
- The Renegades score of 222 was the highest ever score in BBL history. This was then surpassed by the Hurricanes in the second innings.
- The combined total of 445 runs, including a record 58 boundaries, is the highest ever in a BBL match.
- Ben McDermott scored the second-highest individual BBL score, as well as the third-fastest BBL century (47 balls).

16 January
19:10 (D/N)
Scorecard

Melbourne Renegades; 9/171 (20 overs)	v	Adelaide Strikers (H); 8/165 (20 overs)
Marcus Harris 85 (53); Kieron Pollard 3/30 (3 overs)		Ben Dunk 32 (25); Thisara Perera 4/25 (3 overs)

Melbourne Renegades won by 6 runs
Adelaide Oval
Attendance: 42,388
Umpires: John Ward and Tony Wilds
Player of the match: Marcus Harris (Renegades)

- Adelaide Strikers won the toss and elected to field.

20 January
18:40 (D/N)
Scorecard

Melbourne Renegades; 5/199 (20 overs)	v	Brisbane Heat (H); 198 (19.5 overs)
Aaron Finch 71 (35); Mark Steketee 2/37 (4 overs)		Brendon McCullum 64 (40); Thisara Perera 2/27 (4 overs)

Melbourne Renegades won by 1 run
The Gabba
Attendance: 35,112
Umpires: Shawn Craig and Sam Nogajski
Player of the match: Aaron Finch (Renegades)

- Brisbane Heat won the toss and elected to field.
- Andrew Harriott (Renegades) made his T20 debut.
- The crowd of 35,112 is the highest ever for a BBL match at the Gabba.

== Ladder ==
Pos	Team	Pld	W	L	NR	Pts	NRR	Qualification
1	Perth Scorchers (C)	8	5	3	0	10	0.618	Advanced to semi-finals
2	Brisbane Heat	8	5	3	0	10	0.516	Advanced to semi-finals
3	Sydney Sixers	8	5	3	0	10	−0.848	Advanced to semi-finals
4	Melbourne Stars	8	4	4	0	8	0.397	Advanced to semi-finals
5	Melbourne Renegades	8	4	4	0	8	0.042	
6	Adelaide Strikers	8	3	5	0	6	0.334	
7	Hobart Hurricanes	8	3	5	0	6	−0.530	
8	Sydney Thunder	8	3	5	0	6	−0.600	

(C) Champions

=== Ladder progress ===
Round	1	2	3	4	5	6	7	8
Ground	H	H	A	H	A	H	A	A
Result	W	L	W	L	L	L	W	W
Position	2	5	3	4	5	7	5	5

Source: Competitive Matches
A = Away; H = Home; W = Win; D = Draw; L = Lose

== Squad information ==
The following is the Renegades men squad for the 2016–17 Big Bash League season as of 6 January 2017.

S/N	Name	Nationality	Date of birth (age)	Batting style	Bowling style	Notes
Batsmen
5	Aaron Finch	Australia	17 November 1986 (age 39)	Right-handed	Left arm orthodox	Captain
6	Tom Beaton	Australia	28 November 1990 (age 35)	Right-handed	Right arm medium	
26	Tom Cooper	Australia	26 November 1986 (age 39)	Right-handed	Right arm off spin	Non-visa Dutch international
12	Callum Ferguson	Australia	21 November 1984 (age 41)	Right-handed	Right arm medium	
9	Matt Short	Australia	8 November 1995 (age 30)	Right-handed	Right arm off spin	Injury replacement player for Guy Walker
7	Cameron White	Australia	18 August 1983 (age 43)	Right-handed	Right arm leg break	
21	Marcus Harris	Australia	21 July 1992 (age 34)	Left-handed	–	
All-rounders
47	Dwayne Bravo	West Indies	7 October 1983 (age 42)	Right-handed	Right arm fast medium	Visa contract
31	Brad Hogg	Australia	6 February 1971 (age 55)	Left-handed	Slow left-arm wrist-spin	
11	Cameron Stevenson	Australia	30 October 1992 (age 33)	Right-handed	Right arm fast medium	Injury replacement player for Peter Siddle
37	Trent Lawford	Australia	18 April 1988 (age 38)	Right-handed	Right arm fast medium	Replacement player for Matthew Wade
16	Thisara Perera	Sri Lanka	3 April 1989 (age 37)	Left-handed	Right arm fast medium	Visa contract, injury replacement player for Dwayne Bravo
Wicketkeepers
20	Peter Nevill	Australia	13 October 1985 (age 40)	Right-handed	–	
13	Matthew Wade	Australia	26 December 1987 (age 38)	Left-handed	Right arm medium	
64	Andrew Harriott	Australia	3 May 1992 (age 34)	Right-handed	–	Injury replacement for Peter Nevill
Pace bowlers
19	James Pattinson	Australia	3 May 1990 (age 36)	Left-handed	Right arm fast	
35	Nathan Rimmington	Australia	11 November 1982 (age 43)	Right-handed	Right arm fast medium	
10	Peter Siddle	Australia	25 November 1984 (age 41)	Right-handed	Right arm fast medium	
14	Chris Tremain	Australia	10 August 1991 (age 35)	Right-handed	Right arm fast medium	
4	Guy Walker	Australia	12 September 1995 (age 30)	Right-handed	Right arm fast medium	
44	Nick Winter	Australia	19 June 1993 (age 33)	Left-handed	Left arm fast medium	
Spin bowlers
24	Xavier Doherty	Australia	22 November 1982 (age 43)	Left-handed	Left-arm orthodox	
74	Sunil Narine	West Indies	26 May 1988 (age 38)	Left-handed	Right arm off break	Visa contract

== Season statistics ==
=== Most runs ===
Player	Mat	Inns	Runs	Ave	SR	HS	100	50
Aaron Finch	8	8	354	44.25	160.90	71	0	4
Cameron White	8	8	227	32.42	132.74	64*	0	1
Marcus Harris	7	7	220	31.42	132.53	85	0	1
Callum Ferguson	8	7	183	30.50	150.00	39	0	0
Tom Cooper	8	8	167	23.85	159.04	53*	0	1

Source: ESPNcricinfo, 22 January 2017

=== Most wickets ===
Player	Mat	Inns	Wkts	Ave	Econ	BBI	SR
Sunil Narine	8	8	13	19.23	7.81	3/27	14.7
Thisara Perera	4	4	8	17.12	9.13	4/25	11.2
Brad Hogg	8	8	8	28.87	7.21	3/22	24.0
Tom Cooper	8	8	5	23.40	7.80	2/12	18.0
Nathan Rimmington	4	4	4	45.75	26.50	2/37	15.0

Source: ESPNcricinfo, 22 January 2017.

=== Home attendance ===
Match	Opponent	Attendance
1	Sydney Thunder	23,015
2	Perth Scorchers	26,112
4	Melbourne Stars	44,189
6	Hobart Hurricanes	26,816
Total Attendance		120,132
Average Attendance		30,033

=== TV audience ===
BBL games are currently broadcast in Australia by the free-to-air Network Ten.

Following are the television ratings for the Melbourne Renegades's 2016–17 BBL season matches in Australia.

Match No	Teams	Average TV Ratings			
Match No	Teams	National		5 metro cities	
Match No	Teams	Session 1	Session 2	Session 1	Session 2
1	Melbourne Renegades vs Sydney Thunder	1,150,000	1,180,000	759,000	798,000
2	Melbourne Renegades vs Perth Scorchers	932,000	1,290,000	650,000	880,000
3	Melbourne Stars vs Melbourne Renegades	925,000	1,270,000	608,000	868,000
4	Melbourne Renegades vs Melbourne Stars	947,000	1,150,000	625,000	784,000
5	Sydney Sixers vs Melbourne Renegades	1,040,000	1,130,000	709,000	808,000
6	Melbourne Renegades vs Hobart Hurricanes	1,160,000	1,280,000	794,000	907,000
7	Adelaide Strikers vs Melbourne Renegades	1,000,000	1,100,000	692,000	768,000
8	Brisbane Heat vs Melbourne Renegades	1,050,000	1,290,000	716,000	906,000
