= 2011–12 Melbourne Renegades season =

Melbourne Renegades
2011–12 season
- President: James Brayshaw
- Coach: Simon Helmot
- Captain(s): Andrew McDonald
- Home ground: Etihad Stadium
- BBL Season: 7th
- BBL Finals: DNQ
- Leading Run Scorer: Aaron Finch (259)
- Leading Wicket Taker: Shahid Afridi (10)
- Highest home attendance: 15,888
- Lowest home attendance: 10,818
- Average home attendance: 13,323

The 2011–12 Melbourne Renegades season was the inaugural in the club's history. Coached by Simon Helmot and captained by Andrew McDonald, they competed in the BBL's 2011–12 season.

== Summary ==
The Renegades' foundation captain was Victorian all-rounder Andrew McDonald and coached by then Victorian Bushrangers one-day coach, Simon Helmot. In their first season, the Renegade signed local state players such as Aaron Finch, Glenn Maxwell, Brad Hodge and Dirk Nannes, along with Pakistani imports Shahid Afridi and Abdul Razzaq. The Renegades struggled in their first season, only winning two games against the Sydney Thunder and the Sydney Sixers irrespectively. Aaron Finch scored 259 runs, whilst Shahid Afridi took 10 wickets.

== Regular season ==
=== League table ===
Pos	Team	Pld	W	L	NR	Pts	NRR	Qualification
1	Perth Scorchers	7	5	2	0	10	0.626	Advanced to semi-finals
2	Hobart Hurricanes	7	5	2	0	10	0.569	Advanced to semi-finals
3	Sydney Sixers (C)	7	5	2	0	10	0.262	Advanced to semi-finals
4	Melbourne Stars	7	4	3	0	8	0.254	Advanced to semi-finals
5	Brisbane Heat	7	3	4	0	6	0.324	
6	Adelaide Strikers	7	2	5	0	4	−0.338	
7	Melbourne Renegades	7	2	5	0	4	−0.582	
8	Sydney Thunder	7	2	5	0	4	−1.250	

(C) Champions

=== Results by round ===
Round	1	2	3	4	5	6	7
Ground	A	H	A	H	A	H	A
Result	L	L	W	W	L	L	L
Position	8	8	7	5	6	7	7

Updated to match(es) played on January 2011. Source: Big Bash League
A = Away; H = Home; W = Win; L = Loss; NR = No result

=== Matches ===
18 December 2011
17:30 UTC+10:30 (D/N)
Scorecard

Adelaide Strikers; 5/189 (20 overs)	v	Melbourne Renegades; 122 (17.5 overs)
Daniel Harris 49 (33); Aaron Heal 2/32 (4 overs)		Glenn Maxwell 46 (31); Kane Richardson 3/27 (4 overs)

Adelaide Strikers won by 67 runs
Adelaide Oval, Adelaide
Attendance: 11,742
Umpires: Ashley Barrow And Bruce Oxenford
Player of the match: Michael Klinger (Adelaide Strikers)

- Melbourne Renegades won the toss and elected to field.
- Meyrick Buchanan (Melbourne Renegades) made his T20 debut.

22 December 2011
19:00 UTC+11 (D/N)
Scorecard

Melbourne Renegades; 3/188 (20 overs)	v	Perth Scorchers; 2/192 (19.2 overs)
Andrew McDonald 50 (33); Michael Beer 2/28 (4 overs)		Shaun Marsh 99* (52); Andrew McDonald 1/21 (2 overs)

Perth Scorchers won by 8 wickets
Etihad Stadium, Melbourne
Attendance: 13,265
Umpires: Gerard Abood and Bob Parry
Player of the match: Shaun Marsh (Perth Scorchers)

- Melbourne Renegades won the toss and elected to bat.
- Will Sheridan (Melbourne Renegades) made his T20 debut.

30 December 2011
19:00 UTC+11 (D/N)
Scorecard

Melbourne Renegades; 8/140 (20 overs)	v	Sydney Thunder; 7/134 (20 overs)
Brad Hodge 44 (31); Sean Abbott 2/21 (4 overs)		Chris Gayle 75 (54); Shahid Afridi 3/21 (4 overs)

Melbourne Renegades won by 6 runs
ANZ Stadium, Sydney
Attendance: 18,731
Umpires: Ian Lock and Tony Ward
Player of the match: Shahid Afridi (Melbourne Renegades)

- Melbourne Renegades won the toss and elected to bat.
- Tim Cruickshank (Sydney Thunder) made his T20 debut.

2 January 2012
19:00 UTC+11 (D/N)
Scorecard

Sydney Sixers; 6/161 (20 overs)	v	Melbourne Renegades; 2/164 (17.4 overs)
Moises Henriques 41 (30); Josh Hazlewood 1/19 (2 overs)		Brad Hodge 72* (51); Dirk Nannes 2/36 (4 overs)

Melbourne Renegades won by 8 wickets
Etihad Stadium, Melbourne
Attendance: 10,818
Umpires: Mick Martell and Paul Reiffel
Player of the match: Andrew McDonald (Melbourne Renegades)

- Sydney Sixers won the toss and elected to bat.

7 January 2012
19:00 UTC+11 (D/N)
Scorecard

Melbourne Stars; 5/167 (20 overs)	v	Melbourne Renegades; 3/58 (8.1 overs)
David Hussey 51 (42); Shahid Afridi 2/20 (4 overs)		Glenn Maxwell 28 (24); Shane Warne 1/4 (1 over)

Melbourne Stars won by 11 runs (DL method)
Melbourne Cricket Ground, Melbourne
Attendance: 40,227
Umpires: Simon Fry and Geoff Joshua
Player of the match: David Hussey (Melbourne Stars)

- Melbourne Stars won the toss and elected to bat.
- Rain ended the match during the Melbourne Renegades' innings after 8.1 overs. Their target was 70 runs according to the Duckworth–Lewis method.

12 January 2012
19:00 UTC+11 (D/N)
Scorecard

Brisbane Heat; 7/168 (20 overs)	v	Melbourne Renegades; 9/156 (20 overs)
Daniel Vettori 40 (25); Shahid Afridi 3/35 (4 overs)		Aaron Finch 72 (46); Alister McDermott 3/18 (4 overs)

Brisbane Heat won by 12 runs
Etihad Stadium, Melbourne
Attencance: 15,888
Umpires: Ian Lock and Tony Ward
Player of the match: Daniel Vettori (Brisbane Heat)

- Brisbane Heat won the toss and elected to bat.

18 January 2012
16:00 UTC+11
Scorecard

Melbourne Renegades; 4/173 (20 overs)	v	Hobart Hurricanes; 3/174 (19.5 overs)
Aaron Finch 67 (45); Jason Krejza 3/39 (4 overs)		Jonathan Wells 72 (61); Dirk Nannes 1/22 (4 overs)

Hobart Hurricanes won by 7 wickets
Blundstone Arena, Hobart
Attendance: 7,820
Umpires: Gerard Abood and Ashley Barrow
Player of the match: Owais Shah (Hobart Hurricanes)

- Melbourne Renegades won the toss and elected to bat.
- Jayde Herrick and Brenton McDonald (both Melbourne Renegades) made their T20 debut.

== Squad information ==
=== Playing squad ===
The squad for the 2011–12 Big Bash League season is shown below.

- Players with international caps are listed in **bold**
- Ages are given as of 18 December 2011, the date of the first match played in the 2011–12 competition.
- * denotes a player who is currently unavailable for selection.
- * denotes a player who is unavailable for rest of the season.

No.	Name	Nationality	Date of birth (age)	Batting style	Bowling style	Notes
Batsmen
–	Meyrick Buchanan	Australia	15 September 1993 (aged 18)	Right-handed	Right-arm off-break	
5	**Aaron Finch**	Australia	17 November 1986 (aged 25)	Right-handed	Left-arm medium	
33	Michael Hill	Australia	29 September 1988 (aged 23)	Left-handed	Right-arm medium	
7	**Brad Hodge**	Australia	29 December 1974 (aged 36)	Right-handed	Right-arm off-break	
36	Nathan Reardon	Australia	8 November 1984 (aged 27)	Left-handed	Right-arm medium	
All-rounders
10	**Shahid Afridi**	Pakistan	1 March 1980 (aged 31)	Right-handed	Right-arm leg break	Visa contract
1	Glenn Maxwell	Australia	14 October 1988 (aged 23)	Right-handed	Right-arm off-break	
4	**Andrew McDonald**	Australia	5 June 1981 (aged 30)	Right-handed	Right-arm medium-fast	Captain
12	**Abdul Razzaq**	Pakistan	2 December 1979 (aged 32)	Right-handed	Right-arm medium-fast	Visa contract
31	Will Sheridan	Australia	6 May 1987 (aged 24)	Left-handed	Left-arm fast-medium	
Wicket-keepers
–	Ryan Carters	Australia	25 June 1990 (aged 21)	Right-handed	—N/a	
9	**Graham Manou**	Australia	23 April 1979 (aged 32)	Right-handed	—N/a	
Pace bowlers
–	**Shane Harwood**	Australia	1 March 1974 (aged 37)	Right-handed	Right-arm fast	
28	Jayde Herrick	Australia	16 January 1985 (aged 26)	Right-handed	Right-arm fast medium	
26	**Dirk Nannes**	Australia	16 May 1976 (aged 35)	Right-handed	Left-arm fast	
32	**Shaun Tait**	Australia	22 February 1983 (aged 28)	Right-handed	Right-arm fast	
Spin bowlers
8	Aaron Heal	Australia	13 March 1983 (aged 28)	Left-handed	Slow left arm orthodox	
6	Brenton McDonald	Australia	30 April 1984 (aged 27)	Left-handed	Right-arm leg-break	

== Season statistics ==
=== Home attendance ===
Match	Opponent	Attendance
2	Perth Scorchers	13,265
4	Sydney Sixers	10,818
6	Brisbane Heat	15,888
Total Attendance		39,971
Average Attendance		13,323
