= 2024–25 Melbourne Renegades season =

Melbourne Renegades
2024–25 season
- Coach: Cameron White
- Captain(s): Will Sutherland
- Home ground: Marvel Stadium; GMHBA Stadium
- BBL season: 6th
- BBL finals: Did not qualify
- Leading Run Scorer: Tim Seifert (200)
- Leading Wicket Taker: Tom Rogers (16)
- Highest home attendance: 38,031 vs. Melbourne Stars at Marvel Stadium (12 January 2025)
- Lowest home attendance: 13,221 vs. Hobart Hurricanes at GMHBA Stadium (19 December 2024)
- Average home attendance: 21,528

The 2024–25 Melbourne Renegades season was the fourteenth in the club's history. Coached by Cameron White and captained by Will Sutherland they competed in the Big Bash League's 2024–25 season.

== Squad information ==
The current squad of the Melbourne Renegades for the 2024–25 Big Bash League season as of 18 January 2025.

- Players with international caps are listed in **bold**.

No.	Name	Nat.	Date of birth	Batting style	Bowling style	Notes
Batters
6	Josh Brown	Australia	26 December 1993 (age 32)	Right-handed	—N/a	
22	Harry Dixon	Australia	16 February 2005 (age 21)	Left-handed	Right-arm off break	
32	Laurie Evans	England	12 October 1987 (age 38)	Right-handed	Right arm off break	Overseas draft pick (Platinum)
23	**Jake Fraser-McGurk**	Australia	11 April 2002 (age 24)	Right-handed	Right arm leg break	
3	Mackenzie Harvey	Australia	18 September 2000 (age 25)	Left-handed	Right arm medium	
2	**Jacob Bethell**	England	23 October 2003 (age 22)	Left-handed	Slow left-arm orthodox	Overseas draft pick (Gold)
29	Jonathan Wells	Australia	13 August 1988 (age 38)	Right-handed	Right-arm medium	
14	**Marcus Harris**	Australia	21 July 1992 (age 34)	Left-handed	Right-arm off break	
1	Tawanda Muyeye	Zimbabwe	5 March 2001 (age 25)	Right-handed	Right-arm off break	Replacement player for Evans
19	Oliver Peake	Australia	11 September 2006 (age 19)	Left-handed	Right-arm off break	Replacement player for Wells.
All-rounders
16	Hassan Khan	United States	16 October 1998 (age 27)	Left-handed	Slow left-arm orthodox	Replacement player for Bethell.
12	**Will Sutherland**	Australia	27 October 1999 (age 26)	Right-handed	Right arm fast medium	Captain
Wicketkeepers
43	**Tim Seifert**	New Zealand	14 December 1994 (age 31)	Right-handed	—N/a	Overseas draft pick (Gold)
Pace bowlers
26	Xavier Crone	Australia	19 December 1997 (age 28)	Right-handed	Right-arm fast-medium	
	Sam Elliott	Australia	18 February 2000 (age 26)	Right-handed	Right-arm medium	Replacement player for Sandhu.
9	Fergus O'Neill	Australia	27 January 2001 (age 25)	Right-handed	Right-arm fast	
55	**Kane Richardson**	Australia	12 February 1991 (age 35)	Right-handed	Right arm fast medium	
8	Tom Rogers	Australia	3 March 1994 (age 32)	Left-handed	Right arm fast-medium	
63	**Gurinder Sandhu**	Australia	14 June 1993 (age 33)	Left-handed	Right arm fast-medium	
Spin bowlers
24	Callum Stow	Australia	27 August 2002 (age 24)	Right-handed	Left-arm wrist spin	Replacement player for Lyon.
67	**Nathan Lyon**	Australia	20 December 1987 (age 38)	Right-handed	Right arm off break	
88	**Adam Zampa**	Australia	31 March 1992 (age 34)	Right-handed	Right-arm leg break	

== Regular season ==
=== League table ===
Pos	Team	Pld	W	L	NR	Pts	NRR	Qualification
1	Hobart Hurricanes (C)	10	7	2	1	15	−0.120	Advanced to the Qualifier
2	Sydney Sixers	10	6	2	2	14	0.156	Advanced to the Qualifier
3	Sydney Thunder (R)	10	5	3	2	12	0.340	Advanced to the Knockout
4	Melbourne Stars	10	5	5	0	10	0.135	Advanced to the Knockout
5	Perth Scorchers	10	4	6	0	8	0.219	
6	Melbourne Renegades	10	4	6	0	8	0.139	
7	Brisbane Heat	10	3	6	1	7	−0.831	
8	Adelaide Strikers	10	3	7	0	6	−0.122	

Source: ESPNcricinfo
(C) Champions; (R) Runners-up

=== Result by round ===
Round	1	2	3	4	5	6	7	8	9	10
Ground	A	H	H	A	H	A	A	H	A	H
Result	L	W	W	L	L	L	W	L	L	W
Position								8	8	6

Updated to match(es) played on 12 December 2023. Source: Big Bash League
A = Away; H = Home; W = Win; L = Loss; NR = No result

=== Matches ===
Match 2
16 December 2024
19:15 (D/N)
Scorecard

Melbourne Renegades; 7/169 (20 overs)	v	Sydney Sixers; 5/172 (18.3 overs)
Tim Seifert 55 (42); Sean Abbott 2/34 (4 overs)		Moises Henriques 53* (27); Will Sutherland 2/20 (2.3 overs)

Sydney Sixers won by 5 wickets
Sydney Cricket Ground, Sydney
Attendance: 15,217
Umpires: Phillip Gillespie and Sam Nogajski
Player of the match: Moises Henriques (Sydney Sixers)

- Sydney Sixers won the toss and elected to field.

Match 5
19 December 2024
19:15 (N)
Scorecard

Hobart Hurricanes; 74 (12.4 overs)	v	Melbourne Renegades; 4/78 (9 overs)
Nathan Ellis 35 (29); Will Sutherland 3/14 (3 overs)		Tim Seifert 37* (19); Nathan Ellis 2/12 (3 overs)

Melbourne Renegades won by 6 wickets
GMHBA Stadium, Geelong
Attendance: 13,221
Umpires: Phillip Gillespie and Claire Polosak
Player of the match: Tom Rogers (Melbourne Renegades)

- Melbourne Renegades won the toss and elected to field.
- Hobart Hurricanes registered their lowest-ever team total in tournament history.

Match 10
23 December 2024
19:15 (N)
Scorecard

Perth Scorchers; 8/143 (20 overs)	v	Melbourne Renegades; 8/144 (19 overs)
Cooper Connolly 66 (50); Tom Rogers 3/22 (4 overs)		Jacob Bethell 30 (22); Jason Behrendorff 2/33 (4 overs)

Melbourne Renegades won by 2 wickets
Marvel Stadium, Melbourne
Attendance: 18,014
Umpires: Shawn Craig and Gregory Davidson
Player of the match: Tom Rogers (Melbourne Renegades)

- Melbourne Renegades won the toss and elected to field.

Match 16
30 December 2024
19:15 (N)
Scorecard

Sydney Thunder; 4/156 (20 overs)	v	Melbourne Renegades; 8/148 (20 overs)
David Warner 86* (57); Kane Richardson 1/24 (4 overs)		Laurie Evans 40 (26); Wes Agar 4/32 (4 overs)

Sydney Thunder won by 8 runs
ENGIE Stadium, Sydney
Attendance: 12,919
Umpires: Gerard Abood and Troy Penman
Player of the match: David Warner (Sydney Thunder)

- Melbourne Renegades won the toss and elected to field.

Match 20
2 January 2025
19:15 (N)
Scorecard

Melbourne Renegades; 9/142 (20 overs)	v	Adelaide Strikers; 5/143 (17.1 overs)
Josh Brown 66 (41); Henry Thornton 3/22 (4 overs)		Chris Lynn 88 (51); Adam Zampa 2/29 (4 overs)

Adelaide Strikers won by 5 wickets
Marvel Stadium, Melbourne
Attendance: 18,297
Umpires: Shawn Craig and Eloise Sheridan
Player of the match: Chris Lynn (Adelaide Strikers)

- Adelaide Strikers won the toss and elected to field.

Match 23
4 January 2025
19:15 (N)
Scorecard

Melbourne Renegades; 7/168 (20 overs)	v	Melbourne Stars; 5/171 (19.4 overs)
Jacob Bethell 49 (36); Joel Paris 2/23 (4 overs)		Ben Duckett 67 (49); Gurinder Sandhu 3/29 (4 overs)

Melbourne Stars win by 5 wickets
Melbourne Cricket Ground, Melbourne
Attendance: 40,636
Umpires: Shawn Craig and Donovan Koch
Player of the match: Ben Duckett (Melbourne Stars)

- Melbourne Stars won the toss and elected to field.

Match 26
7 January 2025
19:15 (D/N)
Scorecard

Perth Scorchers; 8/147 (20 overs)	v	Melbourne Renegades; 6/150 (19.4 overs)
Ashton Agar 51* (30); Adam Zampa 3/27 (4 overs)		Will Sutherland 70 (45); Lance Morris 2/21 (4 overs)

Melbourne Renegades won by 4 wickets
Optus Stadium, Perth
Attendance: 31,795
Umpires: Shawn Craig and Stephen Dionysius
Player of the match: Tom Rogers (Melbourne Renegades)

- Melbourne Renegades won the toss and elected to field.

Match 32
12 January 2025
19:15 (N)
Scorecard

Melbourne Stars; 165 (20 overs)	v	Melbourne Renegades; 123 (19.5 overs)
Glenn Maxwell 90 (52); Fergus O'Neill 2/16 (4 overs)		Tim Seifert 26 (26); Mark Steketee 5/17 (4 overs)

Melbourne Stars win by 42 runs
Marvel Stadium, Melbourne
Attendance: 38,031
Umpires: Gerard Abood and Ben Treloar
Player of the match: Glenn Maxwell (Melbourne Stars)

- Melbourne Renegades won the toss and elected to field.
- Harry Dixon (Melbourne Renegades) made his T20 debut.
- Mark Steketee (Melbourne Stars) took his first five-wicket haul in T20s.

Match 34
14 January 2025
19:30 (N)
Scorecard

Melbourne Renegades; 7/154 (20 overs)	v	Hobart Hurricanes; 6/155 (19.4 overs)
Jacob Bethell 87 (50); Riley Meredith 3/36 (4 overs)		Matthew Wade 36 (23); Jacob Bethell 2/29 (3 overs)

Hobart Hurricanes won by 4 wickets
Bellerive Oval, Hobart
Attendance: 8,573
Umpires: Gerard Abood and Andrew Crozier
Player of the match: Jacob Bethell (Melbourne Renegades)

- Hobart Hurricanes won the toss and elected to field.
- Callum Stow (Melbourne Renegades) made his T20 debut.

Match 38
18 January 2025
17:00 (D/N)
Scorecard

Brisbane Heat; 4/196 (20 overs)	v	Melbourne Renegades; 7/199 (18 overs)
Jack Wood 45 (27); Adam Zampa 2/29 (4 overs)		Jake Fraser-McGurk 95 (46); Paul Walter 2/23 (4 overs)

Melbourne Renegades won by 3 wickets
Marvel Stadium, Melbourne
Attendance: 20,077
Umpires: Donovan Koch and Ben Treloar
Player of the match: Jake Fraser-McGurk (Melbourne Renegades)

- Melbourne Renegades won the toss and elected to field.
- Oliver Peake (Melbourne Renegades) made his T20 debut.
