= Harriott =

Harriott is an English surname.

== People ==
- Ainsley Harriott (born 1957), English chef and television presenter
- Andrew Harriott (born 1992), Australian cricketer
- Claude Harriott (born 1981), Jamaican-American football player
- Darren Harriott (born 1988), British comedian
- Derrick Harriott (born 1939), Jamaican reggae musician
- Joe Harriott (1928–1973), Jamaican jazz musician
- John Edward Harriott (c. 1797–1866), Canadian fur trader
- Sue Harriott (born 1947), English bowls player
