= Brenton McDonald =

Australian cricketer (born 1984)

Personal information
- Born: 30 April 1984 (age 42)
- Batting: Left-handed
- Bowling: Right-arm legbreak and googly

Domestic team information
- Years: Team
- 2011/12: Melbourne Renegades
- 2012/13: South Australia
- Source: Cricinfo, 19 August 2020

Brenton McDonald (born 30 April 1984) is an Australian former cricketer. A right-arm googly bowler, McDonald played one match in the Big Bash League for the Melbourne Renegades in 2011 and two List A matches for South Australia in October 2012.

The younger brother of former Test cricketer and national coach Andrew McDonald, he was nicknamed Les by his father because he was a "miserable tacker" when he was young.

McDonald played his junior cricket in Albury, New South Wales before moving to Melbourne in 2011 to play for Richmond Cricket Club in the Victorian Premier Cricket Association. McDonald won a premiership with Richmond in 2011–12 before moving to South Australia.

In total, McDonald played for three clubs in two different states. He won three premierships in a row, one with each club.

McDonald retired from cricket in 2016.
