= Andrew Harriott =

Australian cricketer (born 1992)

Personal information
- Full name: Andrew Graeme Harriott
- Born: 3 May 1992 (age 34); Tamworth, New South Wales, Australia
- Batting: Right-handed
- Role: Wicket-keeper

Domestic team information
- Years: Team
- 2014/15–2016/17: ACT Comets
- 2016/17: Melbourne Renegades
- Source: Cricinfo, 29 August 2020

Andrew Harriott (born 3 May 1992) is an Australian cricketer who played a single match for the Melbourne Renegades.
