= Melbourne Renegades =

Melbourne-based franchise cricket team

- Nickname(s): The 'Gades, The Men in Red (During The Melbourne Derby)
- League: Big Bash League
- Association: Cricket Australia

Personnel
- Captain: Will Sutherland
- Coach: Luke Ronchi
- Owner: Cricket Victoria

Team information
- City: Melbourne, Victoria
- Colours: Red
- Founded: 2011; 15 years ago
- Home ground: Melbourne Cricket Ground
- Capacity: 100,024
- Secondary home ground: Junction Oval
- Secondary ground capacity: 7,000

History
- Big Bash League wins: 1 (BBL |08)
- Official website: melbournerenegades.com.au
Regular kit
Indigenous kit

The Melbourne Renegades is an Australian men's professional Twenty20 (T20) franchise cricket team based in Melbourne, Victoria. They compete in the Australian domestic Big Bash League (BBL) competition. As of the 2024–25 season, the team is coached by Cameron White and captained by Will Sutherland. Since the establishment of the BBL in BBL |01, the Renegades have won one title in BBL |08.

On 2 June 2026, it was reported that the brands of the Renegades and the Melbourne Stars would be merged into a new franchise, utilising the Stars' existing BBL license. Nick Cummins, the CEO of Cricket Victoria (CV), has described the new team as "just a merger of brands and staff" and "not a merger of the teams". Two weeks later, it was confirmed that both the Renegades and the Stars would compete in the upcoming 2026–27 season under their existing names.

== History ==
=== Initial seasons (2011–2013) ===
The Renegades' foundation captain was Victorian all-rounder Andrew McDonald and coached by then Victorian Bushrangers one-day coach, Simon Helmot. In their first season, the Renegades signed local state players such as Aaron Finch, Glenn Maxwell, Brad Hodge and Dirk Nannes, along with Pakistani imports Shahid Afridi and Abdul Razzaq. The Renegades struggled in their first season, only winning two games against the Sydney Thunder and the Sydney Sixers respectively. Aaron Finch scored 259 runs, whilst Shahid Afridi took 10 wickets.

The 2012–13 Big Bash League season saw the Renegades release several star players including the previous season's captain, Andrew McDonald. However, the recruitment of consistent players such as Ben Rohrer and Peter Nevill and cricket legend Muttiah Muralitharan, saw the season being the Renegades most successful season to date, finishing on top of the ladder, only losing to the Perth Scorchers in the regular season. Aaron Finch also became the first Renegades player to score a century after scoring 111 from 65 balls against the Melbourne Stars. The Renegades were knocked out by the Brisbane Heat in the semi-finals, losing by 15 runs.

=== Lean years (2013–2017) ===
Despite maintaining the majority of their squad from the previous season and also recruiting Australian test bowlers Peter Siddle and James Pattinson, the Renegades struggled in the 2013–14 Big Bash League season, only winning 3 games, and in the process finishing 6th and missing the finals.

Similarly to the previous season, the Renegades headed into the 2014–15 Big Bash League season with confidence after signing Matthew Wade and Callum Ferguson in the pre-season, but failed to qualify for the finals yet again, finishing 6th. The poor run from the previous season resulted in the coach Simon Helmot being sacked.

The Renegades appointed David Saker as the new coach for the 2015–16 Big Bash League season. The Renegades also signed experienced players Cameron White, Xavier Doherty and Chris Gayle to strengthen their squad.

Renegades got a big boost by signing Brad Hogg, Sunil Narine and Thisara Perera for the 2016–17 Big Bash League season, however narrowly missed finals, finishing 5th on the table.

=== Successful seasons (2017–2019) ===
The 2017–18 Big Bash League season saw the Renegades rejuvenate their squad, with Jack Wildermuth, Mohammad Nabi, Kieron Pollard, Tim Ludeman, Kane Richardson, along with the return of inaugural 2011–12 Renegades player Brad Hodge. They qualify for the finals for the first time after 5 years; finishing 3rd on the table and winning 6 of their 10 matches. However, they were knocked out in semi-final by Adelaide Strikers by one run at Adelaide Oval in front of 36,298 fans.

2018–19 BBL Champions
- 1. Marcus Harris; 2. Aaron Finch (c); 3. Sam Harper (†); 4. Cameron White; 5. Mackenzie Harvey; 6. Tom Cooper; 7. Dan Christian; 8. Cameron Boyce; 9. Kane Richardson; 10. Chris Tremain; 11. Harry Gurney

With the retirements of Brad Hogg and Brad Hodge, the 2018–19 Big Bash League season was similar to the previous, with the Renegades making crucial signings such as Dan Christian, Cameron Boyce, Harry Gurney and Usman Shinwari. The Renegades finished the regular season in second place behind the Hobart Hurricanes, earning a home semi-final against the Sydney Sixers at Docklands. Chasing 181 runs for victory, the Renegades were 6/148, needing 33 runs from 14 balls. They chased the total down with one ball to spare thanks to Dan Christian and Kane Richardson hitting vital boundaries off the bowling of Sean Abbott and Ben Dwarshuis. Due to cross-town rivals, the Melbourne Stars upsetting the Hurricanes in their semi-final the night before, the final was a home Melbourne Derby at Docklands two days after their victory over the Sixers.

The final saw the Stars win the toss and elect to field in front of 40,816 fans. They had the Renegades 5/65 after 10.2 overs, but an unbeaten 80 run partnership between Dan Christian and Tom Cooper saw the Renegades post a modest total of 145 after their 20 overs. The Renegades initially struggled defending the total, with the Stars being 0/93, needing 53 runs off the final 43 deliveries. What transpired next has gone down as one of the biggest "chokes" in Australian sporting history, with the Stars losing 7 wickets in the next five overs and struggling at 7/112. Despite some late hitting from Adam Zampa, the Stars fell 13 runs short, giving the Renegades their first BBL title. Dan Christian was named man of the match for his match saving 38 runs off 30 balls, and 2 wickets for 33 runs off his 4 overs of bowling.

=== Recent dip in form (2019–2022) ===
Following the success of the 2018–19 championship victory, coach Andrew McDonald left his role as head coach in October 2019, less than two months before the beginning of the 2019–20 Big Bash League season. Michael Klinger, who had recently retired from first-class cricket, was appointed coach of the Renegades on 26 November 2019. After signing Pakistani visa players Usman Shinwari and Faheem Ashraf, they pulled out on the eve of the start of the season. Their replacements were English duo Harry Gurney, who played in the BBL championship the previous season, and Richard Gleeson. The Renegades struggled with injuries and form throughout the season, finishing the season in 8th position, but did finish the season on the winners list, defeating the Brisbane Heat by seven wickets.

The following season in 2020–21 had a similar outcome to its predecessor. Visa recruit Imran Tahir pulled out of the season for personal reasons, and returning Australian test bowler James Pattinson was re-called to the national team and was unavailable for selection. Frontline spinner Cameron Boyce also withdrew from the season due to illness. Despite winning their first match of the season against the Perth Scorchers, the Renegades hit an all-time low, losing two matches by over 100 runs, and being consistently outperformed. The season did however see the unearthing of young players such as Jake Fraser-McGurk, Mackenzie Harvey, Will Sutherland, Zak Evans, Mitchell Perry and Peter Hatzoglou. The Renegades finished the season in 8th position again, but did register one more victory in comparison to the previous season. Just days after the Renegades' final victory of the 2020–21 season against the Hobart Hurricanes, Michael Klinger stood down as head coach. Aaron Finch also stood down as captain of the team just weeks before the start of the 2021–22 Big Bash League season, replaced by new recruit Nic Maddinson. This didn't result in a change of fortune as the Renegades finished in 8th position for the third season in a row. The shining highlight was Cameron Boyce taking four wickets in a row in the final match of the season against the Sydney Thunder.

== Home ground ==
The Renegades have played its home games at Docklands Stadium since the league's inception in 2011. A drop-in pitch is used to facilitate cricket at the venue. At the end of the 2016–17 Big Bash League season, the stadium was rated the most entertaining venue for Twenty20 cricket in Australia.

Since the 2017–18 Big Bash League season, the Renegades have also played up to 2 home matches at Kardinia Park in Geelong, approximately 70 kilometres south-west of Melbourne.

Due to the COVID-19 pandemic, the 2020–21 Big Bash League season saw the Renegades play home matches interstate at Bellerive Oval in Hobart, Carrara Stadium on the Gold Coast and Adelaide Oval in Adelaide due to quarantine issues. Only three home games in Victoria were played, with two at Docklands and one at the Melbourne Cricket Ground.

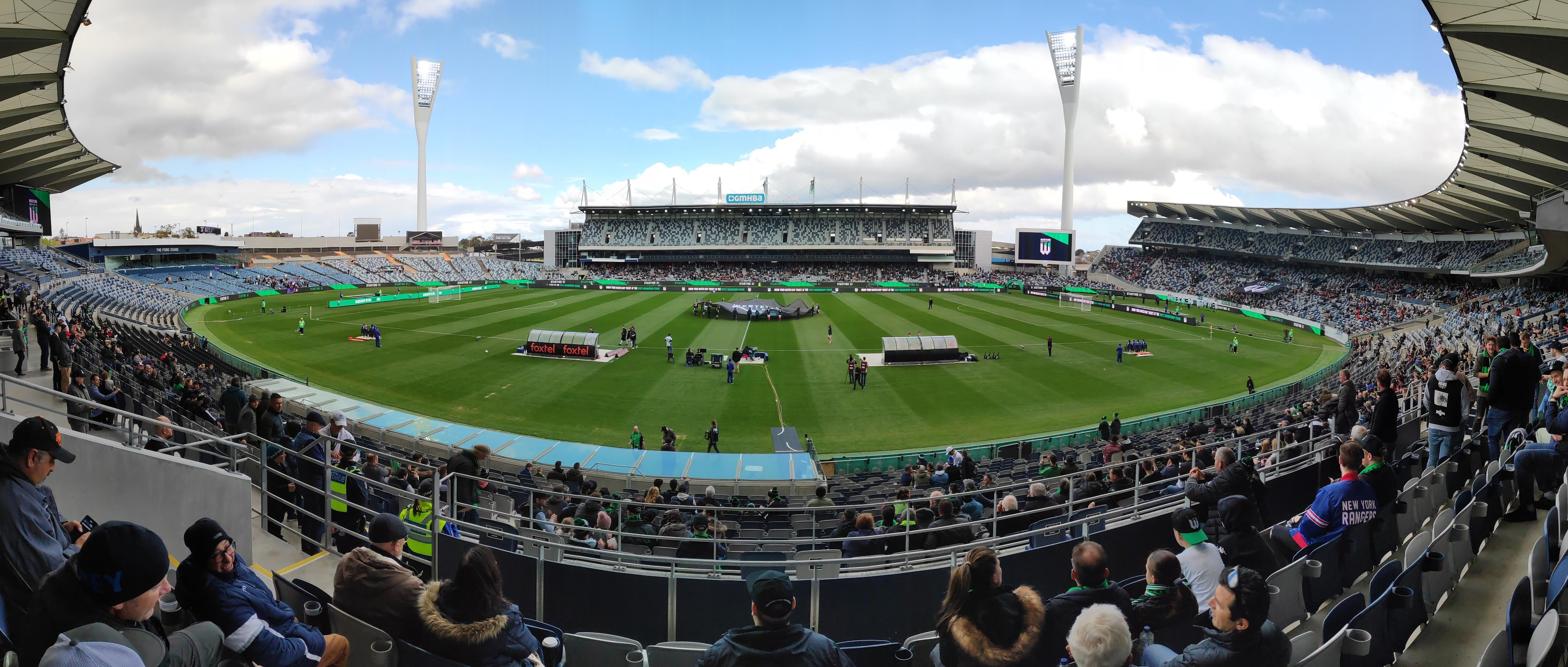
Panoramic view of Kardinia Park in 2019.

Venue	Games hosted by season															
Venue	01	02	03	04	05	06	07	08	09	10	11	12	13	14	15	Total
GMHBA Stadium	0	0	0	0	0	0	1	2	2	0	2	2	1	1	2	13
Marvel Stadium	3	5	4	4	4	4	4	7	5	2	5	6	4	4	3	64

== Players ==
=== Current squad ===
The squad of the Melbourne Renegades for the 2026–27 Big Bash League season as of 9 October 2026.

- Players with international caps are listed in **bold**.

No.	Name	Nat.	Date of birth	Batting style	Bowling style	Notes
Batters
6	Josh Brown	Australia	26 December 1993 (age 32)	Right-handed	Right-arm off spin	
22	Harry Dixon	Australia	16 February 2005 (age 21)	Left-handed	Right-arm off spin	
23	**Jake Fraser-McGurk**	Australia	11 April 2002 (age 24)	Right-handed	Right arm leg spin	
32	Caleb Jewell	Australia	21 April 1997 (age 29)	Left-handed	Left-arm medium	
19	**Oliver Peake**	Australia	11 September 2006 (age 20)	Left-handed	Right-arm medium	
All-rounders
4	**Michael Bracewell**	New Zealand	14 February 1991 (age 35)	Left-handed	Right-arm off spin	International Signing
46	**Ben Manenti**	Italy Australia	23 March 1997 (age 29)	Right-handed	Right-arm off spin	
12	**Will Sutherland**	Australia	27 October 1999 (age 27)	Right-handed	Right-arm fast	Captain
Wicketkeepers
51	**Jonny Bairstow**	England	26 September 1989 (age 37)	Right-handed	—N/a	International Signing
Bowlers
44	Michael Archer	Australia	28 February 1997 (age 29)	Right-handed	Right-arm leg spin	
5	**Jason Behrendorff**	Australia	20 April 1990 (age 36)	Right-handed	Left-arm fast	
35	**Brendan Doggett**	Australia	3 May 1994 (age 32)	Right-handed	Right-arm fast	
1	Sam Elliott	Australia	18 February 2000 (age 26)	Right-handed	Right-arm medium	
8	Tom Rogers	Australia	3 March 1994 (age 32)	Left-handed	Right-arm fast	
24	Callum Stow	Australia	27 August 2002 (age 24)	Right-handed	Left-arm unorthodox	

=== Captains ===
As of 19 January 2022

Name	Seasons	M	W	L	T	NR	W%
Andrew McDonald	2011–2012	7	2	5	0	0	28.57
Aaron Finch	2012–2022	71	31	40	0	0	43.66
Ben Rohrer	2013–2015	5	3	2	0	0	60.00
Cameron White	2016–2018	5	1	4	0	0	20.00
Dwayne Bravo	2018	3	2	1	0	0	66.66
Tom Cooper	2018–2019	8	4	4	0	0	50.00
Dan Christian	2020	5	2	3	0	0	40.00
Shaun Marsh	2020	1	0	1	0	0	0.00
Kane Richardson	2021–2022	3	1	1	0	1	50.00
Nic Maddinson	2021–2022	9	2	7	0	0	22.22

- Source:CricInfo

=== Team of the Decade (2011–2021) ===
On 28 January 2021, to celebrate the inaugural decade of the club and the league, the Renegades announced their team of the decade. All 93 players who had played for the Renegades were eligible for selection, but only two overseas players were permitted in the final XI, in line with the rules for nine of the ten seasons of the competition.

1. Aaron Finch (captain)
2. Shaun Marsh
3. Sam Harper (wicket-keeper)
4. Ben Rohrer
5. Tom Cooper
6. Dan Christian
7. Dwayne Bravo
8. Cameron Boyce
9. Kane Richardson
10. Nathan Rimmington
11. Muttiah Muralitharan
12. Mohammad Nabi (12th man)

== Administration and support staff ==
=== Current staff ===
The current administration and support staff of the Melbourne Renegades for the 2023–24 Big Bash League season as of 23 November 2023.

Position	Name
Head coach	Cameron White
List manager	Andrew Lynch
Assistant coach	Simon Helmot
Assistant coach	Ian Bell
Assistant coach	Andre Borovec
Bowling coach	Michael Lewis
Strength and conditioning coach	Richard Johnson
Physiotherapist	Nick Adcock

- Source: Melbourne Renegades

=== Managerial history ===
As of 19 January 2021

Name	Seasons	M	W	L	NR	W%
Simon Helmot	2011–2015	32	15	17	0	46.88
David Saker	2015–2016	8	3	5	0	37.50
Andrew McDonald	2016–2019	35	20	15	0	57.14
Michael Klinger	2019–2021	28	7	21	0	25.00
David Saker	2021–present	10	3	10	1	23.08

== Identity ==
Official Mascot

The official mascot of the team – 'Sledge' – was revealed on 2 November 2011 after online voting on the team's official Facebook page.

The mascot has been described as the future of cricket. He comes from the year 2020 and wears industrial gear clad in corrugated shin pads and a futuristic helmet that hides his true identity.

For the 2014–15 season a new female mascot, Willow was added, with the club also retaining the Sledge mascot.

== Support and fan following ==
The Renegades averaged 13,323 fans to their home games for the inaugural BBL season, and 13,406 supporters in their second BBL season. The average attendance increased by a huge margin in the third season when they registered an average crowd of 21,929. The fourth season had an even better average crowd of 22,324 fans for their home matches.

Their highest home attendance was to the Melbourne Derby in their third BBL season, attracting 42,837 fans. The biggest non-home attendance in BBL history occurred in the 2015–16 season against the Stars, with 80,883 present. Their largest non-Derby attendance was 30,018, which came in their seventh BBL season against the Perth Scorchers.

Renegades' members have steadily increased with every passing season. They reached their biggest membership mark ever for a season two weeks before the start of the 2015–16 Big Bash League season.

Season	Average attendance	Membership	References
2011–12	13,323	–	
2012–13	13,406	–	
2013–14	21,929	3,383	
2014–15	22,301	5,510	
2015–16	29,010	7,637	
2016–17	30,033	8,828	
2017–18	28,315	–	
2018–19	21,703	–	
2019–20	15,528	–	
2020–21	7,814*	–	
2021–22	7,361*	–	
2022–23	11,809	–	
2023–24	18,251	11,903	
2024–25	21,528	12,187	
2025–26	21,403	12,528	

== Rivalry with Melbourne Stars ==
When the league began in 2011, Cricket Australia decided they would place two teams in Melbourne. With the core group of players for both teams coming from the Victoria cricket team, this rivalry automatically became widely anticipated in Melbourne. The derby between the new two teams, the Melbourne Stars and the Renegades, quickly became hugely popular with big crowds flocking in to the derby matches at both the MCG and Docklands Stadium. In BBL05, during the first leg of the two derbies at the MCG, it drew a record crowd of 80,883 which was the highest crowd for any domestic cricket match ever in the history of the sport at that time which record was later broken in the 2022 Indian Premier League final.

List of Melbourne Derby matches
Date	Winner	Margin	Venue	Attendance	Player of the match
7 January 2012	Stars	11 runs (D/L)	MCG	40,227	David Hussey
7 December 2012	Renegades	8 wickets	Docklands Stadium	23,589	Aaron Finch
6 January 2013	Renegades	9 wickets	MCG	46,581	Aaron Finch
20 December 2013	Stars	76 runs	MCG	25,266	Luke Wright
4 January 2014	Stars	9 wickets	Docklands Stadium	42,837	Cameron White
3 January 2015	Stars	112 runs	Docklands Stadium	33,734	Michael Beer
10 January 2015	Stars	3 wickets	MCG	37,323	Glenn Maxwell
2 January 2016	Stars	7 wickets	MCG	80,883	Luke Wright
9 January 2016	Stars	8 wickets	Docklands Stadium	43,176	Marcus Stoinis
1 January 2017	Renegades	7 runs (D/L)	MCG	71,162	Brad Hogg
7 January 2017	Stars	46 runs	Docklands Stadium	44,189	Adam Zampa
6 January 2018	Renegades	6 wickets	MCG	48,086	Mohammad Nabi
12 January 2018	Stars	23 runs	Docklands Stadium	44,316	Kevin Pietersen
1 January 2019	Stars	7 wickets	MCG	46,418	Marcus Stoinis
19 January 2019	Stars	6 wickets	Docklands Stadium	38,117	Marcus Stoinis
17 February 2019	Renegades	13 runs	Docklands Stadium	40,816	Daniel Christian
4 January 2020	Stars	7 wickets	MCG	54,478	Adam Zampa
10 January 2020	Stars	7 wickets	Docklands Stadium	30,388	Glenn Maxwell
17 January 2021	Stars	6 wickets	MCG	14,979	Liam Hatcher
20 January 2021	Renegades	5 wickets	Docklands Stadium	14,202	Mackenzie Harvey
3 January 2022	Renegades	5 wickets	MCG	21,562	Kane Richardson
13 January 2022	Stars	6 wickets	Docklands Stadium	10,014	Glenn Maxwell
3 January 2023	Renegades	33 runs	MCG	38,564	Tom Rogers
14 January 2023	Renegades	6 runs	Docklands Stadium	22,437	Kane Richardson

== Honours ==
- Big Bash League:
  - Champions (1): BBL |08
  - Runners Up (0):
  - Minor Premiers (1): BBL |02
  - Finals Series Appearances (4): BBL |02, BBL |07, BBL |08, BBL |12
  - Wooden Spoons (3): BBL |09, BBL |10, BBL |11

== Season summaries ==
Chart of yearly table positions for Melbourne Renegades in BBL

Season	Coach	Captain	League position	Finals result	Player of the season	Ref.
2011–12	Simon Helmot	Andrew McDonald	7th	Did not qualify	Aaron Finch	
2012–13	Simon Helmot	Aaron Finch	1st	Semi-finalists	Aaron Finch	
2013–14	Simon Helmot	Aaron Finch	6th	Did not qualify	Aaron Finch	
2014–15	Simon Helmot	Aaron Finch	6th	Did not qualify	James Pattinson	
2015–16	David Saker	Aaron Finch	5th	Did not qualify	Dwayne Bravo	
2016–17	Andrew McDonald	Aaron Finch	5th	Did not qualify	Aaron Finch	
2017–18	Andrew McDonald	Aaron Finch	3rd	Semi-finalists	Tom Cooper	
2018–19	Andrew McDonald	Aaron Finch	2nd	Champions	Dan Christian	
2019–20	Michael Klinger	Aaron Finch	8th	Did not qualify	Beau Webster	
2020–21	Michael Klinger	Aaron Finch	8th	Did not qualify	Sam Harper	
2021–22	David Saker	Nic Maddinson	8th	Did not qualify	Kane Richardson	
2022–23	David Saker	Nic Maddinson	3rd	Knockout	Aaron Finch	
2023–24	David Saker	Nic Maddinson	7th	Did not qualify	Jake Fraser-McGurk	
2024–25	Cameron White	Will Sutherland	6th	Did not qualify		

== Players ==
=== Australian representatives ===
The following is a list of cricketers who have played for the Renegades after making their debut in the national men's team (the period they spent as both a Renegades squad member and an Australian-capped player is in brackets):

- Aaron Finch (BBL|01–13)
- Shane Harwood (BBL|01)
- Brad Hodge (BBL|01, 07)
- Graham Manou (BBL|01)
- Andrew McDonald (BBL|01)
- Dirk Nannes (BBL|01)
- Shaun Tait (BBL|01)
- Fawad Ahmed (BBL|03–04, 12)
- James Pattinson (BBL|03–07, 10–11)
- Ben Rohrer (BBL|03–04)
- Peter Siddle (BBL|03–06, 13)
- Alex Doolan (BBL|04)
- Callum Ferguson (BBL|04–06)
- Matthew Wade (BBL|04–06)
- Xavier Doherty (BBL|05–06)
- Nathan Hauritz (BBL|05)
- Peter Nevill (BBL|05–06)
- Cameron White (BBL|05–08)
- Brad Hogg (BBL|06–07)
- Chris Tremain (BBL|06–08)
- Jon Holland (BBL|07–10)
- Joe Mennie (BBL|07–09)
- Kane Richardson (BBL|07–14)
- Jack Wildermuth (BBL|07–09)
- Cameron Boyce (BBL|08–11)
- Dan Christian (BBL|08–09)
- Marcus Harris (BBL|08–12, 14)
- Shaun Marsh (BBL|09–13)
- Nic Maddinson (BBL|11–13)
- Peter Handscomb (BBL|12)
- Nathan Lyon (BBL|13–15)
- Adam Zampa (BBL|13–15)
- Jake Fraser-McGurk (BBL|14–16)
- Gurinder Sandhu (BBL|14–15)
- Will Sutherland (BBL|14–16)
- Jason Behrendorff (BBL|15–16)
- Brendan Doggett (BBL|15–16)
- Oliver Peake (BBL|16)

=== Overseas signings ===
- (Pakistan) Shahid Afridi (BBL|01)
- (Pakistan) Abdul Razzaq (BBL|01)
- (South Africa) Faf du Plessis (BBL|02)
- (England) Alex Hales (BBL|02)
- (Sri Lanka) Muttiah Muralitharan (BBL|02–03)
- (Cricket West Indies) Marlon Samuels (BBL|02)
- (Cricket West Indies) Dwayne Bravo (BBL|03–07)
- (England) Jos Buttler (BBL|03)
- (Bangladesh) Shakib Al Hasan (BBL|04)
- (Cricket West Indies) Andre Russell (BBL|04, 12)
- (England) Ben Stokes (BBL|04)
- (Cricket West Indies) Chris Gayle (BBL|05)
- (Cricket West Indies) Sunil Narine (BBL|06)
- (Sri Lanka) Thisara Perera (BBL|06)
- (Afghanistan) Mohammad Nabi (BBL|07–11)
- (Cricket West Indies) Kieron Pollard (BBL|07)
- (England) Harry Gurney (BBL|08–09)
- (Pakistan) Usman Shinwari (BBL|08)
- (England) Richard Gleeson (BBL|09)
- (England) Samit Patel (BBL|09)
- (Afghanistan) Noor Ahmad (BBL|10)
- (England) Benny Howell (BBL|10)
- (South Africa) Rilee Rossouw (BBL|10)
- (Pakistan) Imad Wasim (BBL|10)
- (United States) Unmukt Chand (BBL|11)
- (Afghanistan) Zahir Khan (BBL|11)
- (England) Reece Topley (BBL|11)
- (England) Matt Critchley (BBL|12)
- (New Zealand) Martin Guptill (BBL|12)
- (Cricket West Indies) Akeal Hosein (BBL|12–13)
- (Sri Lanka) Ruwantha Kellepotha (BBL|12)
- (Afghanistan) Mujeeb Ur Rahman (BBL|12–13)
- (England) Joe Clarke (BBL|13)
- (England) Jordan Cox (BBL|13)
- (South Africa) Quinton de Kock (BBL|13)
- (New Zealand) Tim Seifert (BBL|14–15)
- (England) Jacob Bethell (BBL|14)
- (England) Laurie Evans (BBL|14)
- (United States) Hassan Khan (BBL|14–15)
- (England) Tawanda Muyeye (BBL|14)
- (Pakistan) Mohammad Rizwan (BBL|15)
- (England) Jonny Bairstow (BBL|16)
- (New Zealand) Michael Bracewell (BBL|16)

== See also ==
- Melbourne Renegades (WBBL)
- Big Bash League
- Cricket Victoria
- Cricket in Victoria
- Twenty20 cricket
- Melbourne University Renegades Volleyball Club
