= Jake Fraser-McGurk =

Australian cricketer (born 2002)

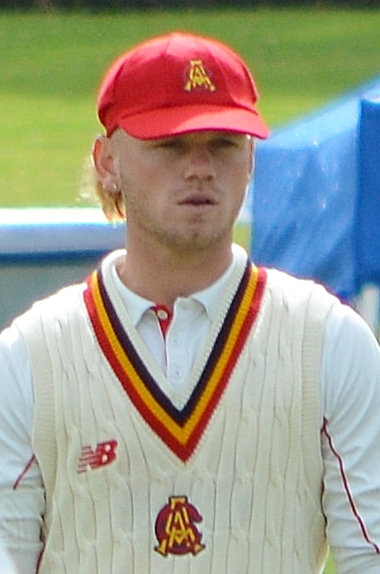
- Fraser-McGurk playing First Class cricket with South Australia in March 2026

Personal information
- Full name: Jake Matthew Fraser-McGurk
- Born: 11 April 2002 (age 24); Box Hill, Victoria, Australia
- Batting: Right-handed
- Bowling: Right-arm leg break
- Role: Batter

International information
- National side: Australia (2024–2025)
- ODI debut (cap 246): 4 February 2024 v West Indies
- Last ODI: 14 February 2025 v Sri Lanka
- ODI shirt no.: 23
- T20I debut (cap 110): 4 September 2024 v Scotland
- Last T20I: 21 November 2026 v England
- T20I shirt no.: 23

Domestic team information
- Years: Team
- 2019/20: Victoria (squad no. 23)
- 2020/21–present: Melbourne Renegades (squad no. 23)
- 2023/24–present: South Australia (squad no. 23)
- 2023/24: Dubai Capitals (squad no. 23)
- 2024–2025: Delhi Capitals (squad no. 33)
- 2024–2025: San Francisco Unicorns

Career statistics
Competition	ODI	T20I	FC	LA
Matches	7	9	18	42
Runs scored	98	116	630	1,064
Batting average	14.00	12.88	19.68	29.55
100s/50s	0/0	0/1	1/1	2/3
Top score	41	50	101	125
Catches/stumpings	3/–	8/–	13/–	17/–
- Source: ESPNcricinfo, 22 November 2026

Jake Matthew Fraser-McGurk (born 11 April 2002) is an Australian international cricketer who has represented the Australia national cricket team in ODI and T20I cricket. McGurk is a right-handed batsman who plays for South Australia, Melbourne Renegades, Delhi Capitals and the San Francisco Unicorns.

McGurk previously played for Victoria and the Dubai Capitals. He scored a fifty on his first-class, List A and IPL debut.

== Early life ==
Fraser-McGurk grew up in the Melbourne suburb of Mont Albert and attended Carey Baptist Grammar School until the end of year 10. He completed his final two years of school through SEDA College. He started playing junior cricket aged 9 at Boroondara Cricket Club.

== Domestic career ==
Fraser-McGurk made his first-class debut on 12 November 2019, for Victoria in the 2019–20 Sheffield Shield. He made his List A debut on 17 November 2019, for Victoria in the 2019–20 Marsh One-Day Cup.

He made his Twenty20 debut on 12 December 2020, for the Melbourne Renegades, in the 2020–21 Big Bash League season. He scored the fastest List-A hundred off 29 balls on 8 October 2023, surpassing the previous record of 31 balls by AB de Villiers. During the 2024 IPL season, Fraser-McGurk played for the Delhi Capitals. On debut, he scored 55 off 35 against the Lucknow Super Giants. He ended the season with 330 runs in 9 innings with a strike rate of 234, and smashing 32 fours and 28 sixes.

== International career ==
In December 2019, Fraser-McGurk was named in Australia's squad for the 2020 Under-19 Cricket World Cup. However, he had to leave the tournament early, after being scratched by a monkey during a team trip to a nature reserve.

In May 2024, he was named as a reserve player in Australia's squad for the 2024 ICC Men's T20 World Cup tournament. On 15 July 2024, Fraser-McGurk was included in the Australia squad for a white-ball tour of England and Scotland to be held in September that year. On 4 September 2024, Fraser-McGurk made his T20I debut for Australia against Scotland. He scored 0 on his debut, becoming the first top 6 batter for Australia to be dismissed for a duck on T20I debut. The same month, he scored his maiden international half-century against England.

== Statistics ==
T20 Franchise Statistics
Team	Season	League		Batting						Bowling						Fielding
Team	Season	Competition	Matches	Innings	Not Outs	Runs	Average	High score	100s / 50s	Overs	Wickets	Runs	Economy	Average	BBM	Catches
Melbourne Renegades	2020/21	BBL	10	10	3	127	18.14	40	0 / 0	1	0	10	10.00	–	–	7
Melbourne Renegades	2021/22	BBL	9	8	0	112	14.00	32	0 / 0	0	0	0	–	–	–	4
Melbourne Renegades	2022/23	BBL	6	6	0	40	6.66	24	0 / 0	0	0	0	–	–	–	6
Melbourne Renegades	2023/24	BBL	9	8	0	257	32.12	70	0 / 2	0	0	0	–	–	–	3
Melbourne Renegades	2024/25	BBL	10	10	0	188	18.80	95	0 / 1	0	0	0	–	–	–	3
Melbourne Renegades	2025/26	BBL	10	10	0	163	16.30	42	0 / 0	0	0	0	–	–	–	12
Melbourne Renegades	Total		54	52	3	887	16.43	95	0 / 3	1	0	10	10.00	–	–	35
Dubai Capitals	2023/24	ILT20	3	3	0	109	36.33	54	0 / 1	0	–	–	–	–	–	0
Dubai Capitals	Total		3	3	0	109	36.33	54	0 / 1	0	–	–	–	–	–	0
Delhi Capitals	2024	IPL	9	9	0	330	36.66	84	0 / 4	0	–	–	–	–	–	3
Delhi Capitals	2025	IPL	6	6	0	55	9.16	38	0 / 0	0	–	–	–	–	–	3
Delhi Capitals	Total		15	15	0	385	25.66	84	0 / 4	0	–	–	–	–	–	6
San Francisco Unicorns	2024	MLC	7	7	0	81	18.00	23	0 / 0	0	–	–	–	–	–	0
San Francisco Unicorns	2025	MLC	11	11	0	275	25.00	88	0 / 2	0	–	–	–	–	–	11
San Francisco Unicorns	Total		18	18	0	356	19.77	88	0 / 2	0	–	–	–	–	–	11
Career Total			81	79	3	1588	20.89	95	0 / 10	1	0	10	10.00	–	–	41

As of match played 17 January 2026
