= David Saker =

Australian cricketer and coach

Personal information
- Full name: David James Saker
- Born: 29 May 1966 (age 60); Melbourne, Victoria, Australia
- Batting: Right-handed
- Bowling: Right-arm fast-medium
- Relatives: Matthew Gale (nephew)

Domestic team information
- Years: Team
- 1994/95–1999/00: Victoria
- 2000/01–2002/03: Tasmania

Career statistics
Competition	First-class	List A
Matches	72	43
Runs scored	1,384	255
Batting average	19.77	15.93
100s/50s	0/4	0/0
Top score	66*	47*
Balls bowled	15,943	2,211
Wickets	247	46
Bowling average	30.10	32.82
5 wickets in innings	5	0
10 wickets in match	2	0
Best bowling	7/32	4/35
Catches/stumpings	18/–	3/–
- Source: CricketArchive, 17 August 2010

David James Saker (born 29 May 1966) is an Australian cricket coach and former player who played first-class cricket for Victoria and Tasmania. He has been the fast bowling coach for the England, Australia and Sri Lanka national cricket team.

== Playing career ==
Saker was born at Melbourne, Victoria in 1966. A right-arm fast-medium bowler, Saker made his first class debut in the 1994–95 season. He spent six years with the Bushrangers before accepting an offer to join the Tasmanian side at the start of the 2000–01 season. As a veteran in a fairly young side he was named as their Player of the Year for 2001–02. Saker was also a handy batsman, making four first class half-centuries, even opening the batting at times for the Bushrangers in limited-overs games. He retired in 2002–03 with 247 wickets to his name at 30.10.

== Coaching ==
In 2004 he became an assistant coach at Victoria under Greg Shipperd.

On 8 April 2010, Saker was appointed as the fast bowling coach of the England cricket team, replacing the departing Ottis Gibson. After Saker's key role in the team winning the 2010–11 Ashes series, he was handed a new three-year contract.

Saker left the English job in early 2015, and was appointed head coach of the Melbourne Renegades in the Big Bash League. Two months later, he was also appointed coach of the Victoria Bushrangers in first class and one day cricket. He led Victoria to the Sheffield Shield in his only season with the state, and was then appointed fast-bowling coach for the Australian national cricket team in July 2016. He resigned on 7 February 2019 with immediate effect following investigations into his role in the ball tampering saga.

In July 2019, he was appointed as the fast bowling coach of the United States national cricket team on a short-term basis. In December 2019, he was appointed as the fast bowling coach of Sri Lanka national cricket team on two-year contract. He then coached England at the 2022 T20 World Cup and agreed to coach the England Test team for the 2023 Ashes.
