= Alex Doolan =

Australian cricketer

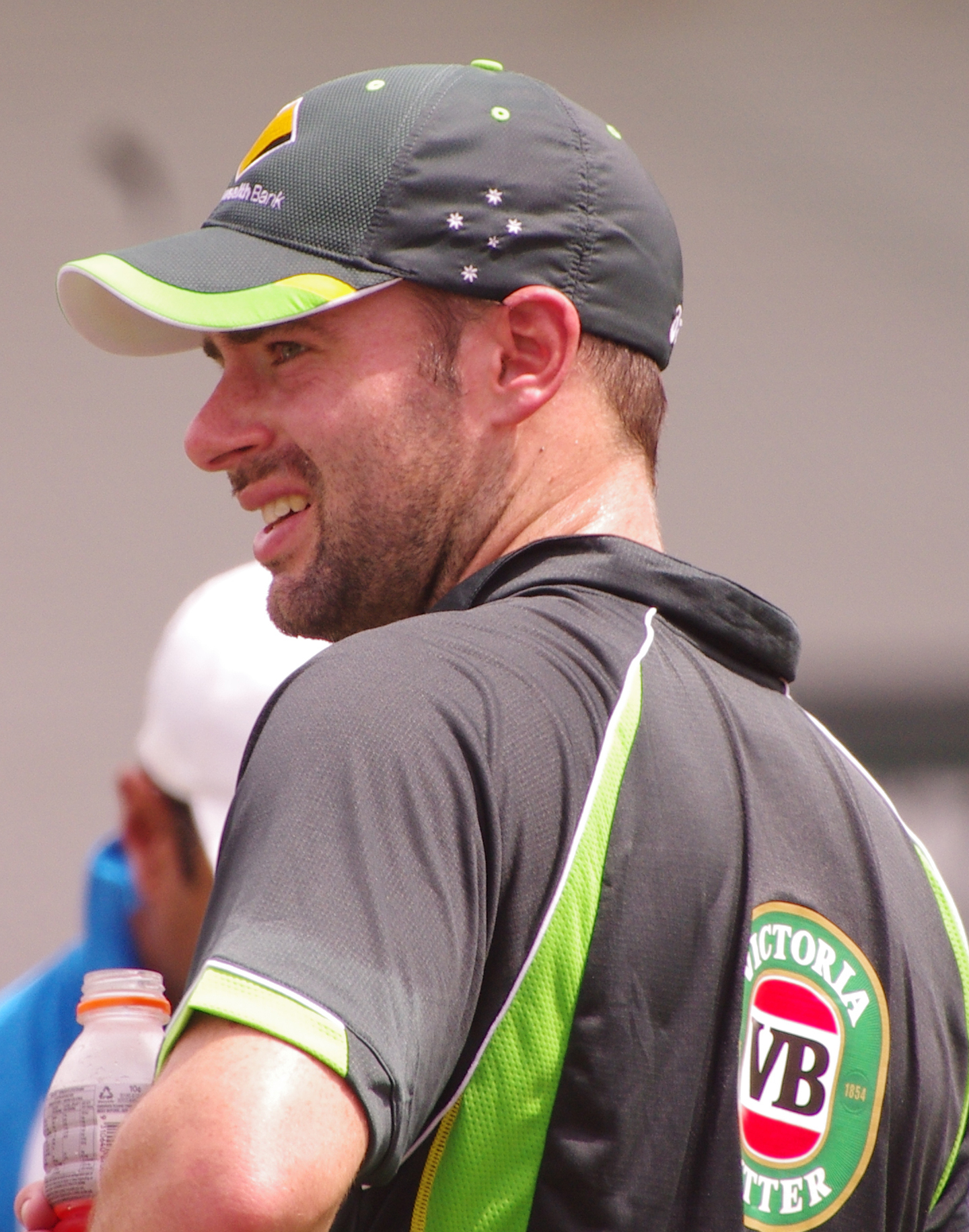
- Doolan in 2014

Personal information
- Full name: Alexander James Doolan
- Born: 29 November 1985 (age 40); Launceston, Tasmania, Australia
- Height: 1.83 m (6 ft 0 in)
- Batting: Right-handed
- Role: Top-order batter
- Relatives: Bruce Doolan (father)

International information
- National side: Australia (2014)
- Test debut (cap 437): 12 February 2014 v South Africa
- Last Test: 22 October 2014 v Pakistan

Domestic team information
- Years: Team
- 2008/09–2020/21: Tasmania
- 2012/13–2014/15: Melbourne Renegades
- 2017/18–2018/19: Hobart Hurricanes

Career statistics
Competition	Test	FC	LA	T20
Matches	4	118	42	27
Runs scored	191	6,824	1,336	409
Batting average	23.87	33.61	36.10	17.04
100s/50s	0/1	12/34	0/9	0/1
Top score	89	247*	96	70*
Catches/stumpings	4/–	82/–	14/–	18/–
- Source: ESPNcricinfo, 24 December 2022

Alexander James Doolan (born 29 November 1985) is an Australian former cricketer, who played domestic cricket for Tasmania from 2009 to 2021 and played four Test matches for Australia in 2014. Despite almost scoring a century on debut, Doolan was dropped after his fourth match and never returned to the national team. He retired from cricket in 2021. As of December 2022, Doolan is the eighth-highest Sheffield Shield run-scorer of all-time for Tasmania.

== Early career ==
Doolan played domestic cricket for his home state of Tasmania and became their regular number three batter. He was playing for the team in the 2010–11 Sheffield Shield season, and was at the crease when teammate Mark Cosgrove hit the winning runs to give Tasmania their second-ever Sheffield Shield title.

The innings that brought Doolan wider public attention was his unbeaten 161 for Australia A against the touring South Africans (then ranked as the number one Test team in the world) in November 2012. His rise to national attention coincided with the retirement of Ricky Ponting from the Australian national cricket team, so Doolan was seen as a potential replacement for Ponting. John Inverarity, Australia's national selector, included Doolan in his shortlist of four players who could replace Ponting. His opportunity did not come, and when the Sheffield Shield went on break for two months to make way for the 2012–13 Big Bash League season, Doolan had less opportunities to play. He was contracted with the Melbourne Renegades for the Big Bash League, but he spent most of the tournament on the bench watching. His form dropped when the Sheffield Shield returned. Doolan finished that summer fourth on the Sheffield Shield tally with 715 runs at 42.05, improving on his leaner 2011–12. Doolan was able to benefit from Ponting's retirement in another way, as Ponting played with Tasmania for the rest of the year and Doolan spent time with him to learn from him.

Doolan came to attention again the next summer with a match-winning century for Tasmania against New South Wales. Doolan had another opportunity to push for selection in Australia's Test team the next summer when he was again selected to play for Australia A, this time against the touring English team. Doolan was added to Australia's Test squad as injury cover for Shane Watson ahead of the final Test match of the 2013–14 Ashes series, but he was not required to play.

== Test selection ==
Doolan was named in Australia's 15-man squad for their 2013–14 tour of South Africa. He was the only member of the squad who hadn't played a Test match before. From the start of the tour, Doolan was prepared to bat at number three for Australia, and he was selected to play in this position in Australia's warm-up match. Doolan made his Test cricket debut in the first match of the series at Centurion Park in February 2014. In the first innings he scored only 27 runs before being dismissed, but in Australia's second innings he calmed Australia's innings after an early wicket and scored 89 runs. After the match, Doolan expressed regret at not scoring a century on debut, saying, "I am not sure I will ever get over that. You only ever get one chance to make a debut hundred and I blew that opportunity, I think I will probably get more disappointed as time goes on rather than the other way around." Despite becoming the incumbent number three batter in the team, Doolan was not awarded a contract by Cricket Australia in 2014. Instead, he signed another contract with Tasmania.

The Test team's next series was against Pakistan in the United Arab Emirates in October 2014. Doolan felt uncomfortable playing in Asia because footwork against spin bowling didn't come naturally to him, but he started the tour well by scoring a century against Pakistan A in a warm-up match. In the first Test match at Dubai International Cricket Stadium, Doolan was "stagnant" at the crease and did not fare well against Pakistan's spin bowlers. He only scored five runs in his first innings, four of them coming from a mishit, and he was out for a duck in the second innings. For the second and final Test match, he was replaced in the team by Glenn Maxwell because Maxwell was a better player of spin bowling. He was dropped from the squad altogether after this series and never again considered for Test selection.

== Later career ==
After being dropped from the Test team, Doolan struggled to regain form. In the 2014–15 Sheffield Shield season his batting average was only 18.94. However, he did have moments of returning to form in subsequent seasons and became a consistent contributor for Tasmania.

In the 2016–17 Matador BBQs One-Day Cup, Doolan scored 362 runs at an average of 120.66 with his highest score being 93. This was the fourth-most runs of any player and the second-highest average (the highest of anyone who'd played in more than 2 matches). He made his career-highest score of 247 runs not out in November 2017, and in November 2019, during the 2019–20 Sheffield Shield season, he became the seventh batsman for Tasmania to score a century in each innings in a first-class match.

Doolan was pushed aside in the 2020–21 Sheffield Shield season to make way for younger players. His final first-class match came when he was a very late replacement for Tim Paine, who had fallen ill. He had to fly from Tasmania to Melbourne on the morning of the match start, and was still in the airport when the match began. At the end of the season, Doolan retired from cricket. At the time of his retirement, he had scored 6,824 first-class runs. 5,978 of his runs were scored for Tasmania in the Sheffield Shield, making him the eighth-highest Sheffield Shield run-scorer in the team's history.
