= Ben Rohrer =

Australian former cricketer (born 1981)

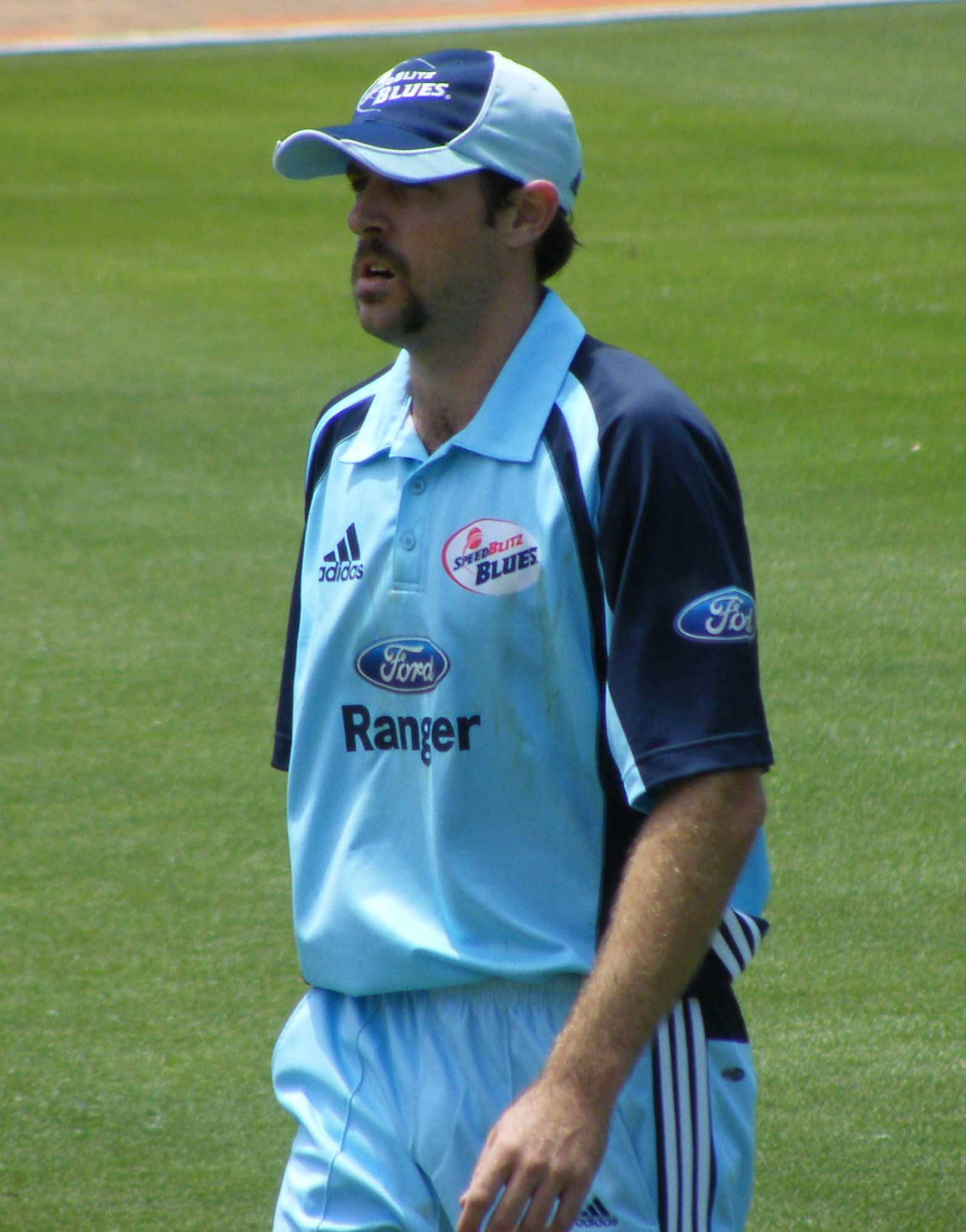

Personal information
- Full name: Ben James Rohrer
- Born: 26 March 1981 (age 45); Bankstown, Sydney, Australia
- Height: 1.80 m (5 ft 11 in)
- Batting: Left-handed
- Bowling: Right-arm medium
- Role: Middle-order batter

International information
- National side: Australia (2013)
- Only T20I (cap 63): 13 February 2013 v West Indies

Domestic team information
- Years: Team
- 2006/07–2016/17: New South Wales
- 2011/12–2012/13: Sydney Sixers
- 2012/13–2014/15: Melbourne Renegades (squad no. 99)
- 2013: Delhi Daredevils
- 2013: Antigua Hawksbills
- 2015/16–2017/18: Sydney Thunder

Career statistics
| Competition | T20I | FC | LA | T20 |
|---|---|---|---|---|
| Matches | 1 | 55 | 47 | 103 |
| Runs scored | 16 | 2,927 | 950 | 1,677 |
| Batting average | 16.00 | 36.13 | 25.67 | 26.20 |
| 100s/50s | 0/0 | 5/17 | 0/5 | 0/3 |
| Top score | 16 | 163 | 80 | 64* |
| Balls bowled | – | 241 | 12 | 6 |
| Wickets | – | 5 | 0 | 0 |
| Bowling average | – | 30.20 | – | – |
| 5 wickets in innings | – | 0 | – | – |
| 10 wickets in match | – | 0 | – | – |
| Best bowling | – | 4/13 | – | – |
| Catches/stumpings | 0/– | 31/– | 15/– | 33/– |
- Source: ESPNcricinfo, 17 July 2020

Ben Rohrer (born 26 March 1981) is an Australian former cricketer who played for the New South Wales in Australian domestic cricket from 2007 to 2016 and various Twenty20 teams in the Big Bash League. Rohrer had a breakout season in the 2012–13 Big Bash League season, which resulted in his selection for the Australian national cricket team in a Twenty20 International and a contract with the Delhi Daredevils in the 2013 Indian Premier League. Rohrer retired from cricket in 2018 and took up a coaching role with Tasmania.

== Cricket career ==
=== Early career ===
Rohrer made his first-class debut for New South Wales (NSW) against Tasmania in March 2007 and scored a century in his debut. Rohrer shone in the Twenty20 format, where he helped NSW win the 2008–09 KFC Twenty20 Big Bash. In the tournament final, he scored a very fast 44 runs from 20 balls to help NSW recover from 4 for 92, and took the game to the last delivery where NSW needed one run for victory. Rohrer was unable to hit the ball, but he and Daniel Smith ran a bye to win.

As the winners of the domestic Twenty20 competition, Rohrer took part in the Blues charge towards victory in the inaugural Twenty20 Champions League. In the first game, a victory against South Africa's Diamond Eagles, Rohrer hit an unbeaten 22 runs off 15 balls including 2 fours and a six. Rohrer scored 19 runs off 11 balls in the semi-final against Victoria which NSW to put them into the final against Trinidad and Tobago who beat NSW earlier in the tournament. In the final NSW batted first and lost quick wickets for very few runs before Rohrer came in at number five and began the NSW revival with a 6 over fine leg before getting out for 16 runs off 12 balls. NSW won the tournament.

=== 2012–13 season ===
In February 2013, the Australian national cricket team was scheduled to play a T20I match against the West Indies at the same time as their Test squad was training for a series in India. The overlap made several of Australia's T20I players unavailable. Rohrer was selected to join the team to help fill in the gaps because he had had a very successful time playing for the Melbourne Renegades in the 2012–13 Big Bash League season. Rohrer scored 16 runs in the match, his Twenty20 International debut, then never played for Australia again.

The Delhi Daredevils signed Rohrer for the 2013 Indian Premier League (IPL) as a replacement for Varun Aaron, who was unavailable due to injury. Following the IPL, he also joined the Antigua Hawksbills for the 2013 Caribbean Premier League, replacing Steve Smith when Smith was unable to get clearance to play in the competition from Cricket Australia.

=== Later career ===
Rohrer suffered a heavy knock to his head from a cricket ball while playing for New South Wales against Victoria in November 2014. During 2014, Cricket NSW entered into a deal to provide a new helmet design for batsmen which provided extra protection for the sides and rear of the batsman's head. Rohrer requested one of these helmets, but it did not arrive before the start of the season. In a November match against Victoria, Rohrer was struck on the head by a bouncer bowled by Chris Tremain. If Rohrer had been wearing the new helmet design, he would have had extra protection from the ball. Rohrer had to be driven from the field on a motorised stretcher, and at hospital was diagnosed with a concussion that lasted for several weeks. He was still recovering from the blow later in the month when his former teammate Phillip Hughes was struck and killed in a similar incident.

In August 2017, New South Wales announced that Rohrer would not be given a contract to play for the state in the 2017–18 season, though he still played for the local Sydney Thunder during the 2017–18 Big Bash League season. Rohrer instead moved to Tasmania and took up a role as their state's talent manager.

In August 2018, Rohrer announced his retirement from all forms of cricket to take up a coaching role in Tasmania.
