= Simon Helmot =

Australian cricket coach

Personal information
- Full name: Simon Grant Helmot
- Born: 12 February 1972 (age 54); Melbourne, Australia
- Batting: Right-handed
- Bowling: Right-hand medium
- Role: Coach

Simon Helmot (born 12 February 1972) is an Australian cricket coach, who was formerly the coach of the Melbourne Renegades.

Simon Helmot began his coaching career early, taking the reins of the Hawthorn-Monash University Cricket Club in Melbourne at 25, while he was still a player. After retiring, Helmot took charge of the Under-19s at the Victorian Institute of Sport and then spent two years coaching the ACT Comets in the Cricket Australia Cup. He returned to Melbourne in 2007 to take up a role as Victoria Bushrangers high performance manager and coached the Australia A side that visited India in 2008. Helmot became an assistant coach under Greg Shipperd at Victoria for the 2008–09 season.

Since 2008–09, Helmot has coached the Victorian Bushrangers in the One Day competition. In that time they have played in three finals, winning the 2010/11 title.

In the 2011/12 season, Helmot was appointed the inaugural coach of the Melbourne Renegades in the newly formed Big Bash League. He served from 2011 to 2015, with his best season coming in 2012–13, where the Renegades finished as minor premiers, but were knocked out in the semi-final to the Brisbane Heat.

On 29 January 2015, Helmot parted ways with the Renegades. Helmot was named head coach in BCB's High Performance Programme in June 2016. As of 2018 he is assistant coach of IPL team Sunrisers Hyderabad.

Recently he has joined with BPL team Chittagong Vikings as head coach.

== See also ==
- Melbourne Renegades
- Victorian Bushrangers
- Big Bash League
- Bangladesh Premier League
