= Nathan Rimmington =

English-Australian cricketer

Personal information
- Full name: Nathan John Rimmington
- Born: 11 November 1982 (age 44); Redcliffe, Queensland, Australia
- Nickname: Rimmo
- Height: 1.77 m (5 ft 10 in)
- Batting: Right-handed
- Bowling: Right-arm fast-medium
- Role: Bowler
- Relatives: Rikki-Lee Rimmington (sister)

Domestic team information
- Years: Team
- 2005/06–2010/11: Queensland
- 2011: Kings XI Punjab
- 2011/12–2016/17: Western Australia
- 2011/12–2012/13: Perth Scorchers
- 2012/13–2016/17: Melbourne Renegades
- 2014: Hampshire
- 2015: Derbyshire
- 2017/18: Queensland
- 2018–2020: Durham (squad no. 11)
- 2018: Nangarhar Leopards

Career statistics
Competition	FC	LA	T20
Matches	53	56	118
Runs scored	1,221	534	214
Batting average	20.35	17.80	9.72
100s/50s	1/4	0/1	0/0
Top score	102*	55	26
Balls bowled	8,432	2,970	2,348
Wickets	134	74	135
Bowling average	31.60	31.58	23.26
5 wickets in innings	3	0	1
10 wickets in match	0	0	0
Best bowling	5/27	4/34	5/27
Catches/stumpings	15/–	10/–	27/–
- Source: ESPNcricinfo, 20 September 2020

Nathan John Rimmington (born 11 November 1982) is an Australian former cricketer who last played for Durham County. He is an attacking right-arm fast-medium bowler. Born in Redcliffe, Queensland, Rimmington holds dual Australian and British citizenship.

Rimmington made his debut for Queensland in 2005–06 as a replacement for Michael Kasprowicz who was on international duty. It was in the Twenty20 tournament where he has impressed, being the leading wicket taker not just for the Bulls but for the competition. A rising star, he won the Peter Burge Medal in 2003–04.

A man-of-the-match performance of 4/40 in the 2008–09 Ford Ranger Cup final ensured an eighth one-day title for Queensland.

He played for Kings XI Punjab in the Indian Premier League in 2011, but was unavailable for the 2012 season due to injury, and was released by the franchise later that year.

Rimmington moved to Western Australia for the 2011–12 season, initially on a two-year deal. Rimmington played for the Perth Scorchers throughout the 2011–12 Big Bash League season and the subsequent Champions League competition, before switching to the Melbourne Renegades for the 2012–13 Big Bash season.

Rimmington signed for Hampshire in July 2014, as cover for their regular overseas player, Kyle Abbott, who was on international duty.
