= Sam Nogajski =

Australian cricket umpire (born 1979)

Personal information
- Full name: Samuel J Nogajski
- Born: 1 January 1979 (age 47); Hobart, Tasmania, Australia
- Role: Umpire

Umpiring information
- Tests umpired: 2 (2025)
- ODIs umpired: 25 (2017–2025)
- T20Is umpired: 38 (2017–2026)
- WODIs umpired: 4 (2014–2016)
- WT20Is umpired: 20 (2010–2019)
- Source: ESPNcricinfo, 24 June 2023

Samuel J Nogajski (born 1 January 1979) is an Australian cricket umpire. He stood as an umpire in the 2016–17 Ranji Trophy in India.

== Career ==
Until 2012, Nogajski was a maths teacher at The Hutchins School. In 2012, he became part of the National Umpire Panel.

In 2016, Nogajski became part of Cricket Australia's international panel of umpires.

Nogajski stood in his first Twenty20 International (T20I) on 19 February 2017, in the match between Australia and Sri Lanka at Kardinia Park, Geelong. He made his One Day International (ODI) umpiring debut on 6 October 2017, in the match between Papua New Guinea and Scotland in the 2015–17 ICC World Cricket League Championship.

In October 2018, Nogajski was named as one of the twelve on-field umpires for the 2018 ICC Women's World Twenty20. In October 2019, he was appointed as one of the twelve umpires to officiate matches in the 2019 ICC T20 World Cup Qualifier tournament in the United Arab Emirates. In January 2020, he was named as one of the sixteen umpires for the 2020 Under-19 Cricket World Cup tournament in South Africa.

== See also ==
- List of Test cricket umpires
- List of One Day International cricket umpires
- List of Twenty20 International cricket umpires
