= List of Champions League Twenty20 captains =

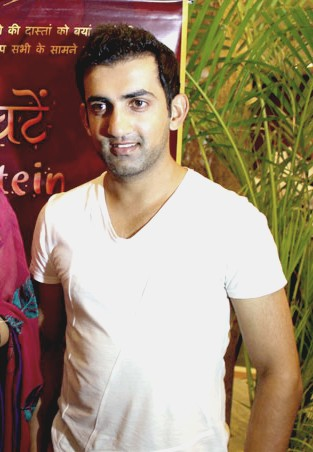
Gautam Gambhir captained in the second-highest number of CLT20 matches, leading the Delhi Daredevils (Note: Now known as the Delhi Capitals) and the Kolkata Knight Riders in 18 matches. He is also one of the only three players to have each led two teams in the tournament.

In cricket, a captain is a player who leads the team and has additional roles and responsibilities. The Champions League Twenty20 (CLT20) was an international professional Twenty20 (T20) cricket league which featured the best performing teams from the domestic T20 cricket leagues of major cricketing nations, such as the Indian Premier League and Australia's Big Bash League. The league was discontinued due to a lack of interest among the fans and the sponsors. In the six editions that were played from 2009 to 2014, 63 players captained their team in at least one match.

MS Dhoni played the highest number of matches as a captain, leading the Chennai Super Kings in 23 matches with a win–loss percentage of 63.04. Among those who captained in more than ten matches, Trinidad and Tobago's (Note: Now known as the Trinidad and Tobago Red Force) Daren Ganga had the best win–loss percentage: 79.16. Among the captains with a 100% win percentage, Sydney Thunder's Brad Haddin captained the highest number of matches: six. On the other hand, Central Stags' Jamie How captained the highest number of matches without registering a win; he led his team in four matches and all of them were lost. Only three players each captained two teams in the CLT20: Gautam Gambhir led the Delhi Daredevils and the Kolkata Knight Riders, Simon Katich led the New South Wales Blues and the Perth Scorchers, and Jehan Mubarak led the Wayamba Elevens (Note: Now known as the Wayamba United) and the Southern Express.

The Highveld Lions (Note: Now known as the Imperial Lions) played the highest number of matches while being under the captaincy of a single player; Alviro Petersen led the team in all of the 14 matches it played in the CLT20. Four players captained the Mumbai Indians and the Cape Cobras in the CLT20, which is the highest among all teams.

== Key ==
Key
Symbol	Meaning
First	Year of the first CLT20 match as a captain
Last	Year of latest CLT20 match as a captain
Mat	Number of matches as a captain
Team(s)	Team(s) for which the player played as captain in at least one match
Won	Number of games won
Lost	Number of games lost
Tied	Number of games tied
NR	Number of games with no result
Win%	Percentage of games won to those captained (Note: Games that did not have a result are not taken into consideration while calculating the result percentage. Ties are counted as half a win.)

== List of CLT20 captains ==
The list includes those players who captained their team in at least one CLT20 match. The list is initially organised by the number of matches as a captain and if the numbers are tied, the list is sorted by last name. (Note: To sort these tables by any statistic, click on the icon in the column title.)

Champions League Twenty20 captains
Player	Nationality (Note: The information in the nationality column is according to Cricinfo. This information may not necessarily reflect the player's birthplace or citizenship.)	First	Last	Mat	Team(s)	Won	Lost	Tied	NR	Win%
MS Dhoni	India	2010	2014	23	Chennai Super Kings	14	8	1	0	63.04
Gautam Gambhir	India	2009	2014	18	Delhi Daredevils; Kolkata Knight Riders	10	7	0	1	58.82
Simon Katich	Australia	2009	2013	15	New South Wales Blues; Perth Scorchers	7	6	1	1	53.57
Alviro Petersen	South Africa	2010	2013	14	Highveld Lions	6	6	1	1	50.00
Daren Ganga	West Indies	2009	2011	12	Trinidad and Tobago	9	2	1	0	79.16
Harbhajan Singh	India	2011	2012	10	Mumbai Indians	4	4	0	2	50.00
Michael Klinger	Australia	2010	2011	9	South Australian Redbacks	5	3	0	1	62.50
Anil Kumble	India	2009	2010	9	Royal Challengers Bangalore	4	5	0	0	44.44
Jehan Mubarak	Sri Lanka	2009	2014	9	Wayamba Elevens; Southern Express	2	7	0	0	22.22
Daniel Flynn	New Zealand	2014	2014	7	Northern Knights	4	3	0	0	57.14
Gareth Hopkins	New Zealand	2011	2012	7	Auckland Aces	3	4	0	0	42.85
Denesh Ramdin	West Indies	2012	2013	7	Trinidad and Tobago	3	3	0	1	50.00
Alfonso Thomas	South Africa	2011	2011	7	Somerset Sabres (Note: Now known as Somerset)	4	2	0	1	66.66
Shikhar Dhawan	India	2013	2013	6	Sunrisers Hyderabad	3	3	0	0	50.00
Rahul Dravid	India	2013	2013	6	Rajasthan Royals	5	1	0	0	83.33
Andrew Gale	England	2012	2012	6	Yorkshire Carnegie (Note: Now known as the Yorkshire Vikings)	2	3	0	1	40.00
Brad Haddin	Australia	2012	2012	6	Sydney Sixers	6	0	0	0	100.00
Davy Jacobs	South Africa	2010	2010	6	Warriors	4	2	0	0	66.66
Mohammad Hafeez	Pakistan	2014	2014	6	Lahore Lions	3	3	0	0	50.00
Brendon McCullum	New Zealand	2013	2013	6	Otago Volts	4	1	1	0	75.00
Daniel Vettori	New Zealand	2011	2011	6	Royal Challengers Bangalore	3	3	0	0	50.00
George Bailey	Australia	2014	2014	5	Kings XI Punjab	4	1	0	0	80.00
Andrew Puttick	South Africa	2009	2009	5	Cape Cobras	3	2	0	0	60.00
Rohit Sharma	India	2013	2013	5	Mumbai Indians	4	1	0	0	80.00
Martin van Jaarsveld	South Africa	2012	2012	5	Titans	2	2	0	1	50.00
Cameron White	Australia	2009	2009	5	Victorian Bushrangers (Note: Now known as Victoria)	2	3	0	0	40.00
Johan Botha	South Africa	2011	2011	4	Warriors	2	2	0	0	50.00
Henry Davids	South Africa	2013	2013	4	Titans	2	2	0	0	50.00
Boeta Dippenaar	South Africa	2009	2009	4	Diamond Eagles (Note: Now known as the VKB Knights)	1	2	1	0	37.50
Rayad Emrit	West Indies	2014	2014	4	Barbados Tridents	1	2	1	0	37.50
Jamie How	New Zealand	2010	2010	4	Central Stags	0	4	0	0	0.00
David Hussey	Australia	2010	2010	4	Victorian Bushrangers	2	1	1	0	62.50
Justin Kemp	South Africa	2011	2011	4	Cape Cobras	1	2	0	1	33.33
Justin Langer	Australia	2009	2009	4	Somerset Sabres	1	3	0	0	25.00
Marcus North	Australia	2012	2012	4	Perth Scorchers	1	2	0	1	33.33
Tim Paine	Australia	2014	2014	4	Hobart Hurricanes	3	1	0	0	75.00
Ramnaresh Sarwan	West Indies	2010	2010	4	Guyana	0	4	0	0	0.00
Sachin Tendulkar	India	2010	2010	4	Mumbai Indians	2	2	0	0	50.00
Morné van Wyk	South Africa	2014	2014	4	Dolphins	0	4	0	0	0.00
James Hopes	Australia	2013	2013	3	Brisbane Heat	0	3	0	0	0.00
Misbah-ul-Haq	Pakistan	2013	2013	3	Faisalabad Wolves	1	2	0	0	33.33
Justin Ontong	South Africa	2014	2014	3	Cape Cobras	0	2	1	0	16.66
Kieron Pollard	West Indies	2014	2014	3	Mumbai Indians	1	2	0	0	33.33
Lahiru Thirimanne	Sri Lanka	2013	2013	3	Kandurata Maroons	0	3	0	0	0.00
Adam Voges	Australia	2014	2014	3	Perth Scorchers	1	2	0	0	33.33
Craig Cumming	New Zealand	2009	2009	2	Otago Volts	0	2	0	0	0.00
Adam Gilchrist	Australia	2009	2009	2	Deccan Chargers	0	2	0	0	0.00
Mahela Jayawardene	Sri Lanka	2012	2012	2	Delhi Daredevils	2	0	0	0	100.00
Jacques Kallis	South Africa	2011	2011	2	Kolkata Knight Riders	1	1	0	0	50.00
Thilina Kandamby	Sri Lanka	2012	2012	2	Uva Next	0	1	0	1	0.00
Shoaib Malik	Pakistan	2012	2012	2	Sialkot Stallions	1	1	0	0	50.00
Ross Taylor	New Zealand	2012	2012	2	Delhi Daredevils	0	1	0	1	0.00
Mahela Udawatte	Sri Lanka	2011	2011	2	Ruhuna Eleven	1	1	0	0	50.00
James Adams	England	2012	2012	1	Hampshire Royals (Note: Now known as Hampshire)	0	1	0	0	0.00
Xavier Doherty	Australia	2014	2014	1	Hobart Hurricanes	0	1	0	0	0.00
Matthew Hoggard	England	2011	2011	1	Leicestershire Foxes	0	1	0	0	0.00
Ed Joyce	Ireland	2009	2009	1	Sussex Sharks	0	1	0	0	0.00
Mitchell Marsh	Australia	2014	2014	1	Perth Scorchers	1	0	0	0	100.00
Dimitri Mascarenhas	England	2012	2012	1	Hampshire Royals	0	1	0	0	0.00
Andrew McDonald	Australia	2011	2011	1	Leicestershire Foxes	0	1	0	0	0.00
Suresh Raina	India	2012	2012	1	Chennai Super Kings	1	0	0	0	100.00
Dane Vilas	South Africa	2014	2014	1	Cape Cobras	0	1	0	0	0.00
Michael Yardy	England	2009	2009	1	Sussex Sharks	0	0	1	0	50.00

== See also ==
- List of Indian Premier League captains
- List of Big Bash League captains
- List of Bangladesh Premier League captains
- List of Pakistan Super League captains
