= List of Adelaide Strikers players =

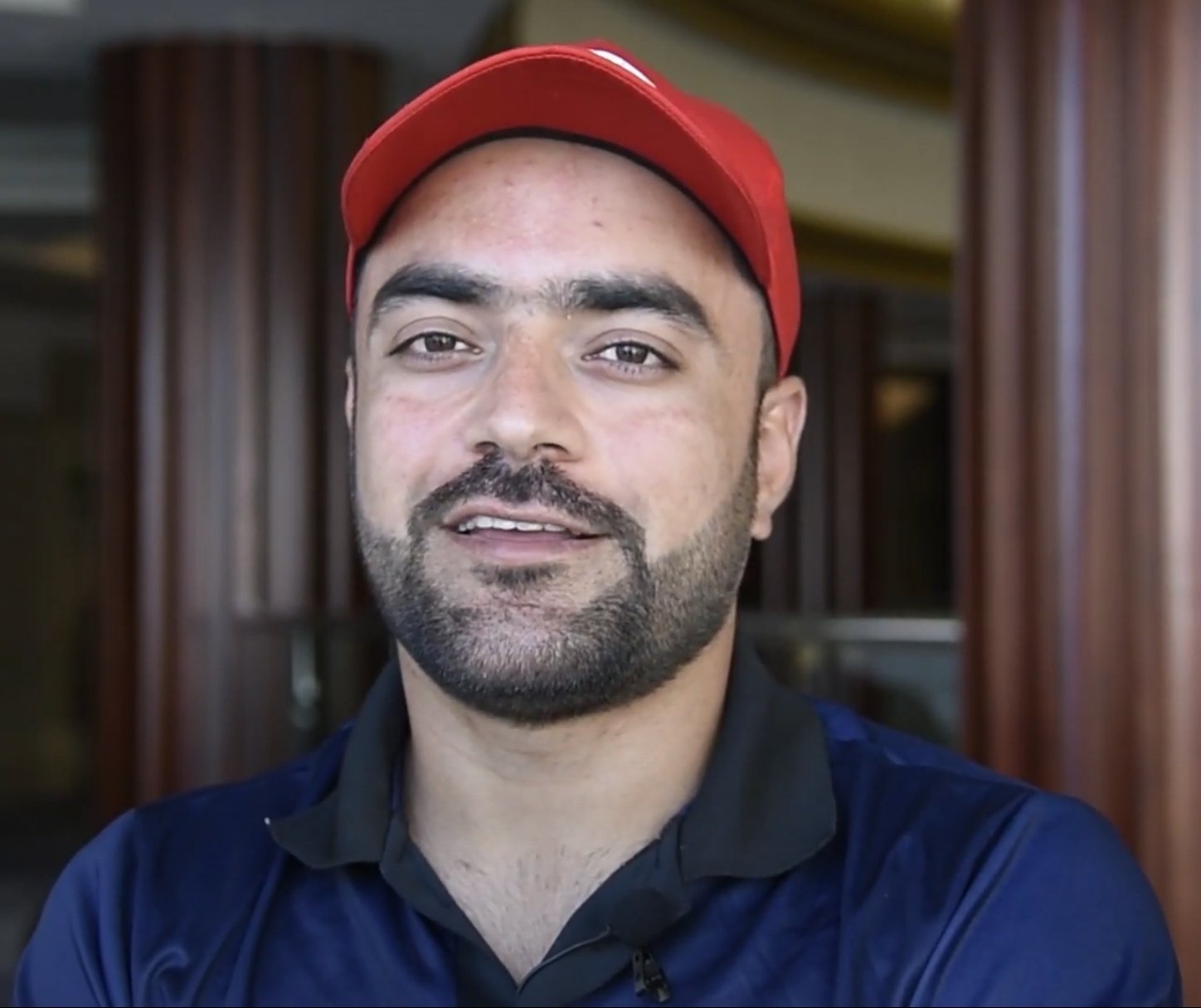
Rashid Khan has played 69 matches for the Adelaide Strikers and taken 98 wickets, the most of any Strikers player.

The Adelaide Strikers are a cricket team based in Adelaide, South Australia, which competes in the Big Bash League (BBL). The team was established in 2011 as part of the creation of the BBL, a revamp of Australia's domestic Twenty20 competition. The Strikers have participated in every edition of the BBL, winning the competition once in the 2017–18 season. As of the end of the 2024/25 BBL Season (BBL 14), ninety-four cricketers have played for the Strikers. Cricket Australia initially restricted each BBL team to two players from other countries on their lists, expanding this to three players ahead of the 2020–21 season. As a result, the vast majority of these players are Australian nationals.

== Men's team players ==
Statistics are correct to the end of the 2024/25 Big Bash League Season (BBL 14).

Adelaide Strikers players				Batting					Bowling							Fielding		Ref
Name	Nat	Career	Mat	Inn	NO	Runs	HS	Avg	Balls	Mdn	Runs	Wkt	Best	Avg	Econ	Ca	St	Ref
Wes Agar	(Australia)	2016/17–2023/24	56	20	8	83	15	6.92	1161	1	1663	69	4/6	24.10	9.12	11	–	
Fabian Allen	(Cricket West Indies)	2024/25	1	1	0	7	7	7.00	12	0	10	1	1/10	10.00	5.00	0	–	
Tom Andrews	(Australia)	2016/17	2	1	0	2	2	2.00	30	0	40	0	–	–	8.00	1	–	
James Bazley	(Australia)	2023/24-	13	11	1	106	31	10.6	102	0	216	2	1/9	108.00	12.71	6	–	
Aiden Blizzard	(Australia)	2011/12	5	5	0	104	30	20.80	–	–	–	–	–	–	–	4	–	
Cameron Borgas	(Australia)	2011/12	6	6	1	111	31	22.20	6	0	20	0	–	–	20.00	3	–	
Johan Botha	(South Africa)	2011/12–2014/15	27	22	9	302	41*	23.23	554	1	627	20	2/11	31.35	6.79	11	–	
Cameron Boyce	(Australia)	2012/13 2023/23-	17	4	2	9	7	4.5	344	0	414	20	3/17	20.70	7.22	1	–	
Jordan Buckingham	(Australia)	2023/24	3	1	1	0	0*	–	60	0	96	2	1/23	48.00	9.60	1	–	
Danny Briggs	(England)	2020/21	14	7	3	55	35*	13.75	275	0	340	11	3/20	30.90	7.41	1	–	
Alex Carey	(Australia)	2016/17–	58	58	3	1868	101	33.96	–	–	–	–	–	–	–	53	6	
Ian Cockbain	(England)	2021/22	6	6	2	239	71*	59.75	–	–	–	–	–	–	–	6	–	
Harry Conway	(Australia)	2019/20–2022/23	23	5	2	16	6	5.33	481	0	682	20	3/36	34.10	8.50	1	–	
Tom Cooper	(Netherlands)	2011/12	5	5	2	101	43*	33.66	–	–	–	–	–	–	–	2	–	
Adam Crosthwaite	(Australia)	2011/12	6	6	0	60	18	10.00	–	–	–	–	–	–	–	3	3	
Jono Dean	(Australia)	2013/14–2017/18	22	19	3	317	54*	19.81	–	–	–	–	–	–	–	5	–	
Colin de Grandhomme	(New Zealand)	2022/23	13	13	1	232	37	19.33	150	0	225	5	2/27	45.00	9.00	2	–	
Theo Doropoulos	(Australia)	2012/13	3	3	1	12	12*	6.00	6	0	12	0	–	–	12.00	1	–	
Brendan Drew	(Australia)	2011/12	3	2	0	15	10	7.50	72	0	90	4	2/27	22.50	7.50	1	–	
Daniel Drew	(Australia)	2021/22	3	3	1	45	23*	22.50	–	–	–	–	–	–	–	0	–	
Brendan Doggett	(Australia)	2023/24-	7	2	1	87	47*	87.00	118	0	161	3	1/16	53.67	8.19	15	–	
Ben Dunk	(Australia)	2016/17	8	8	1	364	85	52.00	12	0	20	1	1/20	20.00	10.00	4	–	
Fawad Ahmed	(Australia)	2021/22	13	2	2	5	4*	–	312	0	391	11	3/16	35.54	7.51	2	–	
Callum Ferguson	(Australia)	2011/12–2013/14	18	16	0	262	52	16.37	–	–	–	–	–	–	–	8	–	
James Franklin	(New Zealand)	2011/12	1	1	0	7	7	7.00	18	0	22	2	2/22	11.00	7.33	0	–	
George Garton	(England)	2021/22	6	6	1	63	19	12.60	120	0	208	6	2/23	34.66	10.40	2	–	
Ryan Gibson	(Australia)	2020/21–2022/23	16	15	5	154	43*	15.40	6	0	10	0	–	–	10.00	9	–	
Alex Hales	(England)	2013/14	8	8	0	175	49	21.87	–	–	–	–	–	–	–	2	–	
Daniel Harris	(Australia)	2011/12	6	6	0	142	49	23.66	6	0	15	0	–	–	15.00	3	–	
Liam Haskett	(Australia)	2023/24	2	1	0	5	5	5.00	30	0	77	2	2/43	38.50	15.40	1	–	
Travis Head	(Australia)	2012/13–	57	55	5	1394	101*	27.88	342	0	459	18	3/16	25.50	8.05	18	–	
Brad Hodge	(Australia)	2014/15–2016/17	20	20	6	593	56*	42.35	6	0	8	0	–	–	8.00	8	–	
Adam Hose	(England)	2022/23-2023/24	23	21	4	402	56*	23.64	–	–	–	–	–	–	–	15	–	
Jon Holland	(Australia)	2013/14–2015/16	12	2	1	5	5*	5.00	216	0	300	8	2/19	37.50	8.33	5	–	
Phillip Hughes	(Australia)	2012/13–2013/14	8	8	1	175	74	25.00	–	–	–	–	–	–	–	5	–	
Henry Hunt	(Australia)	2021/22-2022/23	9	9	0	154	49	17.11	–	–	–	–	–	–	–	3	–	
Colin Ingram	(South Africa)	2017/18–2018/19	25	25	5	610	75	30.50	72	0	103	1	1/20	103.00	8.58	6	–	
Mahela Jayawardene	(Sri Lanka)	2015/16	7	7	0	191	57	27.28	–	–	–	–	–	–	–	1	–	
Matt Johnston	(Australia)	2012/13	2	2	2	11	8*	–	30	0	51	2	1/22	25.50	10.20	0	–	
Chris Jordan	(England)	2016/17	5	5	1	36	18	9.00	102	0	158	9	3/24	17.55	9.29	6	–	
Thomas Kelly	(Australia)	2021/22-2023/24	34	27	7	409	43	20.45	–	–	–	–	–	–	–	12	–	
Rashid Khan	(Afghanistan)	2017/18–2022/23	69	49	15	403	40	11.85	1598	1	1716	98	6/17	17.51	6.44	15	–	
Hamish Kingston	(Australia)	2015/16	1	–	–	–	–	–	12	0	23	1	1/23	23.00	11.50	0	–	
Michael Klinger	(Australia)	2011/12–2013/14	22	22	3	663	86*	34.89	–	–	–	–	–	–	–	8	–	
Ben Laughlin	(Australia)	2014/15–2018/19	50	12	3	53	22	5.88	1009	0	1357	60	4/26	22.61	8.06	13	–	
Trent Lawford	(Australia)	2014/15	2	1	0	4	4	4.00	24	0	30	0	–	–	7.50	1	–	
Jake Lehmann	(Australia)	2015/16–2018/19	30	25	4	267	46	12.71	24	0	42	1	1/5	42.00	10.50	13	–	
Tim Ludeman	(Australia)	2012/13–2016/17	37	34	6	846	92*	30.21	–	–	–	–	–	–	–	21	1	
Chris Lynn	(Australia)	2022/23-	25	25	3	950	88	43.18	–	–	–	–	–	–	–	4	–	
Nathan Lyon	(Australia)	2011/12–2012/13	4	2	0	2	2	1.00	71	0	96	2	1/26	48.00	8.11	2	–	
Ben Manenti	(Australia) (Italy)	2022/23-2023/24	5	3	1	36	23	18.00	30	0	49	0	–	–	9.80	2	–	
Bryce McGain	(Australia)	2011/12	3	1	1	0	0*	–	60	0	113	2	1/43	56.50	11.30	0	–	
James Muirhead	(Australia)	2011/12	2	1	1	5	5*	–	30	0	54	4	2/17	13.50	10.80	1	–	
Michael Neser	(Australia)	2012/13–2020/21	62	39	13	348	40*	13.38	1202	2	1671	62	3/24	26.95	8.34	30	–	
Harry Nielsen	(Australia)	2017/18-	49	31	9	459	50	20.86	–	–	–	–	–	–	–	31	3	
Ben Oakley	(Australia)	2013/14	2	–	–	–	–	–	24	0	50	0	–	–	12.50	2	–	
Aaron O'Brien	(Australia)	2011/12	7	5	1	28	13	7.00	168	0	181	6	3/26	30.16	6.46	0	–	
Liam O'Connor	(Australia)	2016/17–2020/21	23	7	3	7	2	1.75	456	0	586	15	3/30	39.06	7.71	8	–	
Jamie Overton	(England)	2023/24-	18	15	11	276	45*	69.00	396	0	582	27	3/23	21.55	8.81	12	–	
David Payne	(England)	2023/24	10	3	2	35	14*	35.00	196	0	306	12	3/37	25.50	9.36	3	–	
Kieron Pollard	(Cricket West Indies)	2012/13–2016/17	18	16	2	311	65*	22.21	186	0	286	12	3/30	23.83	9.22	8	–	
LLoyd Pope	(Australia)	2023/24-	16	2	0	1	1	0.50	336	0	502	28	4/22	17.93	8.96	3	–	
Ollie Pope	(England)	2024/25-	9	9	0	191	57	21.22	–	–	–	–	–	–	–	5	3	
Gary Putland	(Australia)	2012/13–2015/16	7	2	1	1	1*	1.00	132	2	186	3	2/39	62.00	8.45	3	–	
Adil Rashid	(England)	2015/16	9	4	3	43	25	43.00	208	0	226	16	3/23	14.12	6.51	1	–	
Nathan Reardon	(Australia)	2012/13–2013/14	16	14	2	320	43	26.66	12	0	29	0	–	–	14.50	4	–	
Matt Renshaw	(Australia)	2020/21–2021/22	25	25	3	513	63	23.31	60	0	97	1	1/38	97.00	9.70	9	–	
Kane Richardson	(Australia)	2011/12–2016/17	36	17	5	162	45	13.50	728	3	964	37	3/9	26.05	7.94	15	–	
Alex Ross	(Australia)	2014/15–2015/16 2024/25-	28	24	4	503	65	25.15	–	–	–	–	–	–	–	13	–	
Saeed Ajmal	(Pakistan)	2012/13	1	–	–	–	–	–	24	0	22	1	1/22	22.00	5.50	0	–	
Daniel Salpietro	(Australia)	2011/12	2	2	0	13	12	6.50	48	0	65	1	1/28	65.00	8.12	1	–	
Phil Salt	(England)	2019/20–2020/21	30	30	1	671	67*	23.13	–	–	–	–	–	–	–	13	–	
Liam Scott	(Australia)	2020/21–	9	8	3	100	67	20.00	66	0	125	2	1/23	62.50	11.36	1	–	
Shakib Al Hasan	(Bangladesh)	2013/14	2	2	0	48	46	24.00	30	0	31	2	2/21	15.50	6.20	1	–	
D'Arcy Short	(Australia)	2023/24-	20	20	1	432	66	22.74	74	0	102	6	4/15	17.00	8.27	6	–	
Matthew Short	(Australia)	2018/19-	79	77	6	2073	109	29.19	829	0	919	28	3/14	32.82	6.65	47	–	
Peter Siddle	(Australia)	2017/18–2022/23	72	22	13	42	11	4.67	1458	2	1738	91	5/16	19.09	7.15	16	–	
Craig Simmons	(Australia)	2014/15–2015/16	13	13	0	223	46	17.15	84	0	88	3	2/26	29.33	6.28	3	–	
James Smith	(Australia)	2012/13	1	1	0	5	5	5.00	6	0	15	1	1/15	15.00	15.00	0	–	
Kelvin Smith	(Australia)	2014/15–2016/17	2	2	1	41	41*	41.00	6	0	7	0	–	–	7.00	0	–	
Ish Sodhi	(New Zealand)	2016/17	3	2	2	13	8*	–	69	0	70	9	6/11	7.77	6.08	0	–	
Billy Stanlake	(Australia)	2015/16–2019/20	39	9	8	13	4*	13.00	812	0	1081	34	3/17	31.79	7.98	6	–	
Shaun Tait	(Australia)	2012/13–2014/15	18	5	3	3	2	1.50	384	0	503	28	3/22	17.96	7.85	0	–	
Ryan ten Doeschate	(Netherlands)	2014/15	5	5	0	60	26	12.00	–	–	–	–	–	–	–	1	–	
Alfonso Thomas	(South Africa)	2011/12	7	4	2	17	7	8.50	156	0	177	5	3/24	35.40	6.80	0	–	
Henry Thornton	(Australia)	2021/22-	31	11	7	44	28*	11.00	646	1	931	48	5/3	19.39	8.69	7	–	
Cameron Valente	(Australia)	2018/19–2020/21	14	9	4	84	21	16.80	210	0	318	8	2/36	39.75	9.08	1	–	
Jake Weatherald	(Australia)	2016/17–	93	92	7	2176	115	25.60	–	–	–	–	–	–	–	34	–	
Jonathan Wells	(Australia)	2017/18–2021/22	71	68	22	1740	73	37.82	–	–	–	–	–	–	–	24	–	
Greg West	(Australia)	2015/16	2	–	–	–	–	–	36	0	62	2	2/24	31.00	10.33	1	–	
Cameron White	(Australia)	2019/20	6	5	2	36	18	12.00	–	–	–	–	–	–	–	2	–	
Daniel Worrall	(Australia)	2020/21–2021/22	16	11	5	92	62*	15.33	335	1	404	15	2/12	26.93	7.23	3	–	
Brad Young	(Australia)	2012/13	5	2	1	12	9*	12.00	108	0	120	5	2/37	24.00	6.66	0	–	
Adam Zampa	(Australia)	2013/14–2014/15	12	3	1	15	10*	7.50	246	0	288	11	2/26	26.18	7.02	2	–	

== Captains ==
Statistics are correct to the end of the 2024/25 Big Bash League Season (BBL 14).

Name	Nat	Span	Mat	Won	Lost	Tied	NR	Win %
Michael Klinger	(Australia)	2011/12	7	2	5	0	0	28.57
Johan Botha	(South Africa)	2012/13–2014/15	23	12	9	0	2	57.14
Phillip Hughes	(Australia)	2013/14	2	0	2	0	0	0.00
Brad Hodge	(Australia)	2015/16–2016/17	17	10	7	0	0	58.82
Travis Head	(Australia)	2017/18–2022/23	28	17	11	0	0	60.71
Colin Ingram	(South Africa)	2017/18–2018/19	14	5	9	0	0	35.71
Alex Carey	(Australia)	2019/20–2020/21	16	7	8	0	1	46.66
Peter Siddle	(Australia)	2020/21–2022/23	27	12	15	0	0	44.44
Matt Short	(Australia)	2022/23-	20	12	8	0	0	60.00
Alex Ross	(Australia)	2024/25	3	2	1	0	0	66.67

== See also ==
- List of Big Bash League captains
