= Ben Oakley =

Ben Oakley may refer to:

- Ben Oakley (canoeist) (born 1988), British canoeist who won a bronze medal at the Wildwater Canoeing World Championships
- Ben Oakley (cricketer) (born 1982), Australian cricketer who played Big Bash League for the Adelaide Strikers
