= List of Pakistan Super League captains =

Pakistan Super League is a professional Twenty20 cricket league, which is operated by the Pakistan Cricket Board. It is contested between six franchises comprising cricketers from Pakistan and around the world (excluding India). A player who leads the cricket team is known as its captain. Each team usually has one nominated captain, although if that player is not participating in a match another player will deputise for them. The captain of a cricket team typically shoulders more responsibility for results than team captains in other sports.

== Key ==
Word	Meaning
First	Year of the first match played as a captain
Last	Year of latest match played as a captain
Matches	Number of matches played as a captain
Team(s)	Team(s) for which the player has played as captain
Won / Lost	Number of games won / lost as a captain
Tied	Number of games tied
NR	Number of games with no result
	Denotes a player who is full time captain of their respective franchise.

== List of PSL captains ==
This is a list of the players who have acted as captain in at least one match of PSL. Five teams competed in both; first and second seasons of the league and with the addition of Multan Sultans in 2018 season currently six teams compete for the title. Shaheen Afridi, captain of the team Lahore Qalandars, who has led his team thrice to become the champions with 18 wins out of 35 played with a winning percentage of 51.42. His team have been the champions in 2022 and in 2023, becoming the first ever team in PSL history to successfully defend their PSL title. Shan Masood & Rilee Rossouw was led the Karachi Kings & Quetta Gladiators in PSL 9 respectively. Shadab Khan was the winning captain for Islamabad United in PSL 2024.

Pakistan Super League captains
Player	Nationality	First	Last	Matches	Team(s)	Won	Lost	Tied	NR	Win%
Sarfraz Ahmed	Pakistan	2016	2023	80	Quetta Gladiators	38	41	0	1	48.10
Misbah-ul-Haq	Pakistan	2016	2018	26	Islamabad United	15	10	1	0	59.61
Shahid Afridi	Pakistan	2016	2016	10	Peshawar Zalmi	6	4	0	0	60
Shoaib Malik	Pakistan	2016	2019	30	Karachi Kings; Multan Sultans; Peshawar Zalmi	10	19	0	1	34.48
Azhar Ali	Pakistan	2016	2016	7	Lahore Qalandars	2	5	0	0	28.5
Dwayne Bravo	West Indies	2016	2016	1	Lahore Qalandars	0	1	0	0	0
Shane Watson	Australia	2016	2016	2	Islamabad United	1	1	0	0	50
Ravi Bopara	England	2016	2016	1	Karachi Kings	0	1	0	0	0
Darren Sammy	West Indies	2017	2020	39	Peshawar Zalmi	22	16	0	1	57.89
Brendon McCullum	New Zealand	2017	2018	18	Lahore Qalandars	5	11	2	0	33.33
Kumar Sangakkara	Sri Lanka	2017	2017	10	Karachi Kings	5	5	0	0	50
Imad Wasim	Pakistan	2018	2023	51	Karachi Kings	23	24	2	2	48.97
Eoin Morgan	England	2018	2018	3	Karachi Kings	1	2	0	0	33.33
JP Duminy	South Africa	2018	2018	2	Islamabad United	2	0	0	0	100
Mohammad Hafeez	Pakistan	2018	2019	4	Peshawar Zalmi; Lahore Qalandars	2	2	0	0	50
Rumman Raees	Pakistan	2018	2018	2	Islamabad United	1	1	0	0	50
Mohammad Amir	Pakistan	2018	2018	1	Karachi Kings	0	1	0	0	0
Mohammad Sami	Pakistan	2019	2019	9	Islamabad United	4	5	0	0	44.44
Shadab Khan	Pakistan	2019	2024	56	Islamabad United	31	24	0	1	55.35
AB de Villiers	South Africa	2019	2019	3	Lahore Qalandars	1	2	0	0	33.33
Fakhar Zaman	Pakistan	2019	2019	5	Lahore Qalandars	1	4	0	0	20.00
Shan Masood	Pakistan	2020	2024	21	Multan Sultans Karachi Kings	10	9	1	1	47.61
Sohail Akhtar	Pakistan	2020	2021	23	Lahore Qalandars	12	11	0	0	52.17
Wahab Riaz	Pakistan	2020	2022	28	Peshawar Zalmi	13	14	0	0	48.21
Babar Azam	Pakistan	2020	2024	33	Karachi Kings; Peshawar Zalmi	12	20	0	1	36.36
Mohammad Rizwan	Pakistan	2021	2024	48	Multan Sultans	32	16	0	0	66.66
Usman Khawaja	Australia	2021	2021	1	Islamabad United	1	0	0	0	100
Shaheen Afridi	Pakistan	2022	2024	35	Lahore Qalandars	18	15	1	1	51.42
Asif Ali	Pakistan	2022	2022	3	Islamabad United	0	3	0	0	0
Mohammad Nawaz	Pakistan	2023	2023	2	Quetta Gladiators	1	1	0	0	50
Tom Kohler-Cadmore	England	2023	2023	1	Peshawar Zalmi	0	1	0	0	0
David Wiese	South Africa	2023	2023	1	Lahore Qalandars	0	1	0	0	0
Rilee Rossouw	South Africa	2024	2024	11	Quetta Gladiators	5	5	0	1	45.45

Source: ESPNcricinfo

== See also ==
- List of Pakistan Super League cricketers
- List of Pakistan Super League records and statistics
- Pakistan Super League - PSL Tickets for Season 10
