= South African cricket team in Australia in 2014–15 =

International cricket tour

	Australia	South Africa
- Dates: 2 November – 23 November 2014
Captains	Aaron Finch (T20); Michael Clarke & George Bailey (ODI)	JP Duminy (T20); AB de Villiers (ODI)

One Day International series
- Results: Australia won the 5-match series 4–1
Most runs	Steve Smith (254)	AB de Villiers (271)
Most wickets	Josh Hazlewood (9)	Morne Morkel (10)
- Player of the series: Steve Smith (Aus)

Twenty20 International series
- Results: Australia won the 3-match series 2–1
Most runs	Aaron Finch (91)	Quinton de Kock (94)
Most wickets	James Faulkner (6)	Kyle Abbott (4)
- Player of the series: James Faulkner (Aus)

The South Africa cricket team toured Australia from 2 to 23 November 2014. The tour consisted of three Twenty20 Internationals (T20I) and five One Day International (ODI) matches. During the ODI series, the International Cricket Council undertook a trial to broadcast the discussions between the on-field and television umpires. Australian captain Michael Clarke injured his hamstring during the first ODI game and was ruled out for the rest of the series. George Bailey captained the side in his absence.

Australia won the T20I series 2–1 and the ODI series 4–1. With their win in the final ODI match, Australia went to number one in the ODI rankings.

== Squads ==
ODIs		T20s	
Australia	South Africa	Australia	South Africa
George Bailey (C); Nathan Coulter-Nile; Pat Cummins; Xavier Doherty; James Faulkner; Aaron Finch; Josh Hazlewood; Mitchell Johnson; Mitchell Marsh; Glenn Maxwell; Kane Richardson; Steve Smith; Mitchell Starc; Matthew Wade (WK); David Warner; Shane Watson; Michael Clarke (withdrew)	AB de Villiers (C); Hashim Amla; Kyle Abbott; Quinton de Kock (WK); JP Duminy; Faf du Plessis; Imran Tahir; Ryan McLaren; David Miller; Morne Morkel; Wayne Parnell; Robin Peterson; Vernon Philander; Rilee Rossouw; Dale Steyn	Aaron Finch (C); Sean Abbott; Doug Bollinger; Cameron Boyce; Patrick Cummins; Ben Cutting; Ben Dunk (WK); James Faulkner; Nic Maddinson; Glenn Maxwell; Nathan Reardon; Kane Richardson; Shane Watson; Cameron White	JP Duminy (C); Kyle Abbott; Farhaan Behardien; Quinton de Kock (WK); Marchant de Lange; Reeza Hendricks; Imran Tahir; Ryan McLaren; David Miller; Wayne Parnell; Robin Peterson; Kagiso Rabada; Rilee Rossouw; David Wiese

== Tour match ==
=== Twenty20: Cricket Australia XI v South Africans ===
2 November 2014
Scorecard

Cricket Australia XI; 5/189 (20 overs)	v	South Africa; 167 (18.5 overs)
Ashton Turner 73 (46); Kyle Abbott 2/22 (4 overs)		Rilee Rossouw 47 (29); Ben Ashkenazi 3/21 (2.5 overs)

Cricket Australia XI won by 22 runs
North Sydney Oval, Sydney
Umpires: Greg Davidson (Aus) and Tony Wilds (Aus)

- South Africans won the toss and elected to field.

== T20I series ==
=== 1st T20I ===
5 November 2014
7:05 PM
Scorecard

Australia; 6/144 (20 overs)	v	South Africa; 3/145 (19 overs)
Shane Watson 47 (36); Kyle Abbott 3/21 (4 overs)		Rilee Rossouw 78 (50); Patrick Cummins 1/21 (4 overs)

South Africa won by 7 wickets
Adelaide Oval, Adelaide
Umpires: Simon Fry (Aus) and John Ward (Aus)
Player of the match: Rilee Rossouw (SA)

- Australia won the toss and elected to bat.
- This was South Africa's first victory in Australia in T20Is.
- Ben Dunk, Nathan Reardon (both Aus) and Rilee Rossouw, Kagiso Rabada and Reeza Hendricks (all SA) made their T20I debuts.

=== 2nd T20I ===
7 November 2014
7:35 PM
Scorecard

South Africa; 7/101 (20 overs)	v	Australia; 3/102 (12.4 overs)
JP Duminy 49 (51); James Faulkner 3/25 (4 overs)		Aaron Finch 44* (30); Wayne Parnell 2/17 (3.4 overs)

Australia won by 7 wickets
Melbourne Cricket Ground, Melbourne
Umpires: Simon Fry (Aus) and Mick Martell (Aus)
Player of the match: Cameron Boyce (Aus)

- South Africa won the toss and elected to bat.

=== 3rd T20I ===
9 November 2014
7:35 PM
Scorecard

South Africa; 6/145 (20 overs)	v	Australia; 8/146 (19.5 overs)
Reeza Hendricks 49 (48); James Faulkner 3/28 (4 overs)		Cameron White 41* (31); David Wiese 3/21 (4 overs)

Australia won by 2 wickets
Sydney Olympic Stadium, Sydney
Umpires: Mick Martell (Aus) and John Ward (Aus)
Player of the match: Cameron White (Aus)

- Australia won the toss and elected to field.

== ODI series ==
=== 1st ODI ===
14 November 2014
11:20 AM (D/N)
Scorecard

Australia; 8/300 (50 overs)	v	South Africa; 268 (48.1 overs)
George Bailey 70 (75); Vernon Philander 4/45 (10 overs)		AB de Villiers 80 (76); Nathan Coulter-Nile 4/48 (10 overs)

Australia won by 32 runs
WACA Ground, Perth
Umpires: Simon Fry (Aus) and Nigel Llong (Eng)
Player of the match: Nathan Coulter-Nile (Aus)

- South Africa won the toss and elected to field.
- AB de Villiers became the fastest player to score 7,000 career runs in ODI cricket.

=== 2nd ODI ===
16 November 2014
11:20 AM (D/N)
Scorecard

Australia; 154 (41.4 overs)	v	South Africa; 7/157 (27.4 overs)
Mitchell Marsh 67 (88); Morné Morkel 5/21 (8 overs)		AB de Villiers 48 (41); Josh Hazlewood 5/31 (9.4 overs)

South Africa won by 3 wickets
WACA Ground, Perth
Umpires: Billy Bowden (NZ) and John Ward (Aus)
Player of the match: Morné Morkel (SA)

- Australia won the toss and elected to bat.
- Morné Morkel's 5/21 are his best figures in ODIs.

=== 3rd ODI ===
19 November 2014
2:20 PM (D/N)
Scorecard

Australia; 5/329 (50 overs)	v	South Africa; 9/256 (44.3 overs)
Aaron Finch 109 (127); Morné Morkel 2/84 (10 overs)		Hashim Amla 102 (115); Mitchell Starc 4/32 (8 overs)

Australia won by 73 runs
Manuka Oval, Canberra
Umpires: Simon Fry (Aus) and Nigel Llong (Eng)
Player of the match: Steve Smith

- Australia won the toss and elected to bat.

=== 4th ODI ===
21 November 2014
2:20 PM (D/N)
Scorecard

South Africa; 8/267 (50 overs)	v	Australia; 7/268 (49 overs)
AB de Villiers 91 (88); James Faulkner 2/45 (10 overs)		Steve Smith 104 (112); Dale Steyn 2/47 (9 overs)

Australia won by 3 wickets
Melbourne Cricket Ground
Umpires: Billy Bowden (NZ) and John Ward (Aus)
Player of the match: Steve Smith

- South Africa won the toss and elected to bat.
- Australia completed their first ever ODI victory over South Africa at the MCG

=== 5th ODI ===
23 November 2014
2:20 PM (D/N)
Scorecard

South Africa; 6/280 (50 overs)	v	Australia; 8/275 (47.1 overs)
Quinton de Kock 107 (123); Pat Cummins 3/54 (9 overs)		Shane Watson 82 (93); Robin Peterson 4/32 (6.1 overs)

Australia won by 2 wickets (DLS method)
Sydney Cricket Ground
Umpires: Nigel Llong (Eng) and Mick Martell (Aus)
Player of the match: Quinton de Kock (SA)

- South Africa won the toss and elected to bat.
- Australia's innings was revised to 48 overs and target to 275 after a rain delay.
