= Nathan Reardon =

Australian cricketer

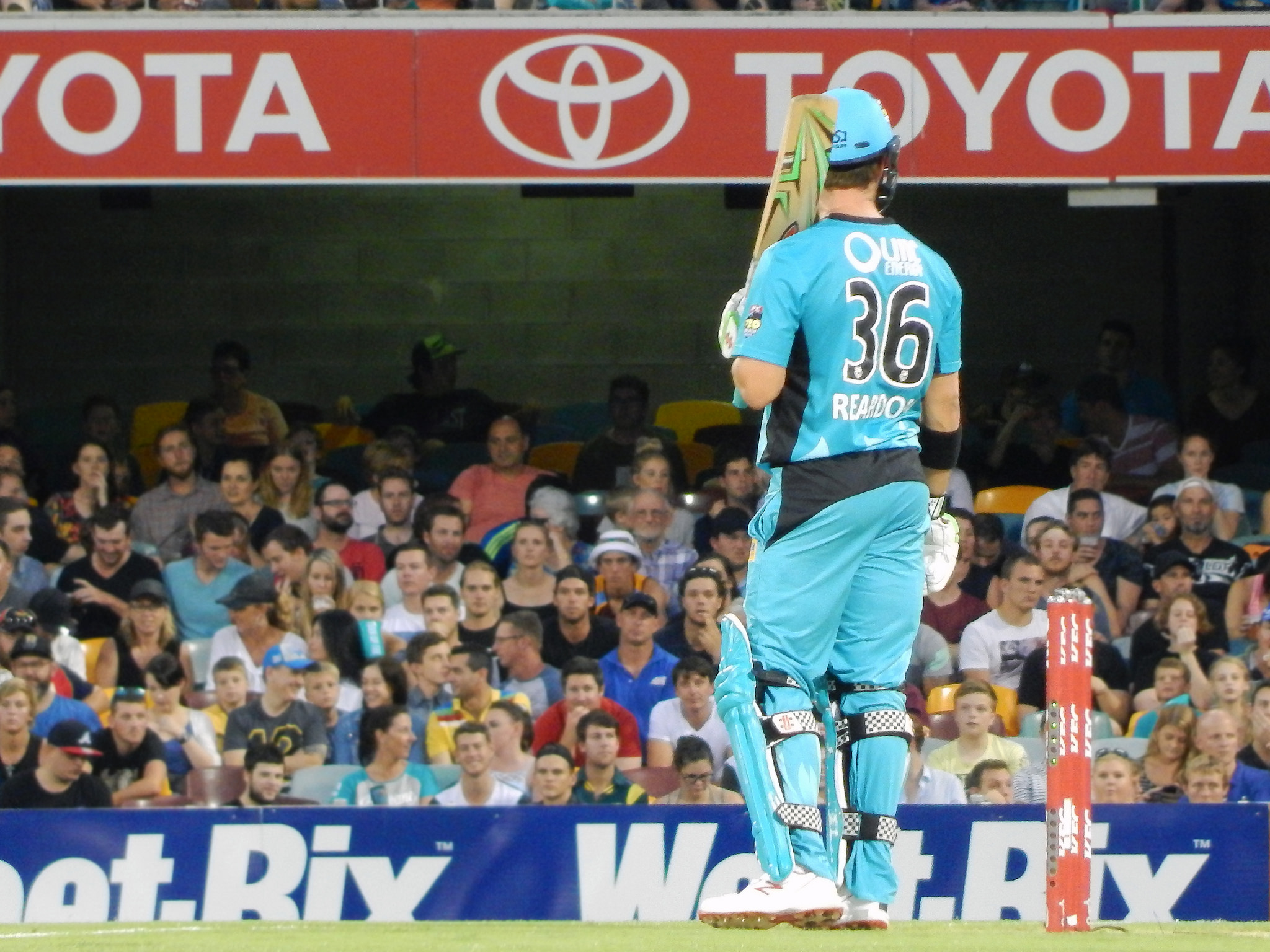

Personal information
- Full name: Nathan Jon Reardon
- Born: 8 November 1984 (age 42); Chinchilla, Queensland, Australia
- Nickname: Reardo
- Batting: Left-handed
- Bowling: Right-arm medium
- Role: Middle-order batter

International information
- National side: Australia (2014)
- T20I debut (cap 73): 5 November 2014 v South Africa
- Last T20I: 7 November 2014 v South Africa
- T20I shirt no.: 35

Domestic team information
- Years: Team
- 2005/06–2016/17: Queensland
- 2011/12: Melbourne Renegades
- 2012/13–2013/14: Adelaide Strikers
- 2014/15–2016/17: Brisbane Heat
- 2016/17: Northern Districts
- 2017/18: Hobart Hurricanes

Career statistics
Competition	T20I	FC	LA	T20
Matches	2	30	88	75
Runs scored	4	1,305	2,466	1,188
Batting average	4.00	26.10	31.61	20.84
100s/50s	0/0	1/6	2/20	0/4
Top score	4	147	116	56
Balls bowled	–	938	138	71
Wickets	–	15	1	3
Bowling average	–	43.53	137.00	35.33
5 wickets in innings	–	0	0	0
10 wickets in match	–	0	0	0
Best bowling	–	3/14	1/11	2/20
Catches/stumpings	0/–	13/–	26/–	23/–
- Source: ESPNcricinfo, 8 May 2022

Nathan Jon Reardon (born 8 November 1984) is an Australian former professional cricketer. He primarily played as a batsman in limited overs matches, playing for his home state of Queensland from 2005 to 2016. He also played Twenty20 cricket in the Big Bash League for four different teams, and represented Australia in two Twenty20 Internationals in November 2014.

== Cricket career ==
Reardon made his debut for Queensland in its opening game of the 2005–06 ING Cup on 14 October 2005. He was selected as the team's "super sub" (an experimental rule allowing a player to be substituted into the match partway through) to replace the injured Chris Simpson. He was considered an all-rounder early in his career, combining his batting with medium-pace bowling, but later on bowled less and was included in the team purely for his batting.

Across his career, Reardon experienced more success in one-day and Twenty20 matches than he did in longer first-class matches. He had his best season in the 2011–12 Ryobi One-Day Cup. He scored his maiden one-day century in a match against Western Australia on 11 February 2012. Although Queensland went on to lose the game by 5 runs, Reardon was still named the player of the match for his efforts. Reardon finished the competition with 403 runs at an average of 57.57, the second-most runs of any batter in the competition.

Reardon was included in the Australian national cricket team's squad for a Twenty20 International (T20I) series against South Africa in November 2014. This series was being played in very close proximity to a Test series in the United Arab Emirates, which made a number of Test players unavailable for the T20I series. Reardon was selected off of the back of his strong batting in the 2014–15 Matador BBQs One-Day Cup to make up for this unavailability. He made his T20I debut in the first match of the series at Adelaide Oval on 5 November. His cap was presented to him by former Australian batsman Michael Hussey. He played his second and final T20I two days later on 7 November at the Melbourne Cricket Ground, and was never selected to play for Australia again. He played his final professional cricket game for the Hobart Hurricanes in the Big Bash League in February 2018.

== See also ==
- List of Queensland first-class cricketers
- List of Adelaide Strikers players
