= 2022 Pakistan Super League final =

Cricket match

2022 Pakistan Super League Final
- Event: 2022 Pakistan Super League
Lahore Qalandars	Multan Sultans
Lahore Qalandars team colours	Multan Sultans team colours
180/5	138
20 overs	19.3 overs
- Lahore Qalandars won by 42 runs
- Date: 27 February 2022
- Venue: Gaddafi Stadium, Lahore
- Player of the match: Mohammad Hafeez (Lahore Qalandars)
- Umpires: Aleem Dar; Richard Illingworth
- Attendance: 27,000

The 2022 Pakistan Super League Final was a Twenty20 cricket match played on 27 February 2022 at the Gaddafi Stadium in Lahore, Pakistan, between defending champion Multan Sultans and Lahore Qalandars to decide the champions of the 2022 edition of the Pakistan Super League (PSL). Lahore Qalandars won the match by 42 runs, to win their maiden HBL PSL title. Haris Rauf took the final wicket, of Tayyab Tahir off the third ball of the 20th over, to complete the Qalandars' victory.

== Background to the Final ==
Multan Sultans suffered a major setback after their middle order batter Tim David tested positive for COVID-19 and had to miss their qualifier match, however, this news was not confirmed nor denied by team's management. The team however found little difficulty in defeating Lahore Qalandars by 28 runs thanks to half centuries by captain Mohammad Rizwan (53 not out) and Rilee Rossouw (65 not out) and the bowling effort by Shahnawaz Dahani (3/19). For the losing side Fakhar Zaman fought a lone battle, scoring 63.

In the first eliminator, Islamabad United, although fighting both COVID and injury related issues as well as controversies, rode their mercurial opener Alex Hales (69) and all round display by man of the match Faheem Ashraf (19 not out and 1/15) to edge out a fighting team of Peshawar Zalmi led by a tearful Wahab Riyaz. In the topsy turvy contest where momentum swayed back and forth, United sneaked home with three balls to go, eliminating Peshawar Zalmi who fought till the last over thanks to handy contributions by Shoaib Malik (55) and Salman Irshad (3/31).

In the second eliminator Lahore Qalandars got the better of Islamabad United in another close encounter like the first eliminator. Batting first Lahore Qalandars scored 168/7 supported by a solid 52 by Abdullah Shafique and all round display by David Wiese (28 not out off only 8 balls and 1/20). Islamabad United fell short by 6 runs as they were all out with 2 balls left in their stipulated 20 overs in spite of the efforts by Azam Khan (40 off 28 balls) and Alex Hales (38 off 29 balls).

One day before the final, Tim Davis rejoined the team after fully recovering and returning negative report during a routine PCR testing. Lahore Qalandars head coach and team director Aqib Javed tested covid-19 positive and had to miss team's both Eliminator 2 and final fixtures. The prize money for the winners and runners-up was set at PKR 80 million and PKR 32 million, respectively.

== Route to the Final ==
At the end of the league stage, Multan Sultans and Lahore Qalandars played ten matches each and finished at 1st and 2nd positions respectively on points table. Multan Sultans had an outstanding league stage phase where they lost only once (which was against Lahore Qalandars). Lahore Qalandars won six matches, lost three and managed to tie one but lost in the Super over. In the playoffs, Multan faced Lahore in the Qualifier in Lahore, where Multan was victorious by 28 runs and became the first team to reach the final. Lahore Qalandars after losing, faced Islamabad United (winners of Eliminator 1) in the Eliminator 2, Lahore posted 168 in 20 overs and after a close finish won the match by only 6 runs.

League progression
Team	Group matches										Playoffs		
Team	1	2	3	4	5	6	7	8	9	10	Q1/E	Q2	F
Lahore Qalandars	0	2	4	6	6	8	10	10	12	12	L	W	W
Multan Sultans	2	4	6	8	10	12	12	14	16	18	W		L

Win	Loss	No result

- Note: The total points at the end of each group match are listed.
- Note: Click on the points (group matches) or W/L (playoffs) to see the match summary.

=== League stage matches ===
Both sides played each other twice in the round-robin stage of the tournament. The first League-stage match was won by Multan Sultans by 5 wickets, held in Karachi on 29 January. Sultans won the toss and invited Qalandars to bat first. Qalandars started their innings well and posted a massive total of 206 runs for the loss of 5 wickets on the back of Fakhar Zaman's brilliant knock of 76 runs off 35 balls. In reply, Sultans also started really well, their openers came out all gun blazing and managed to put up a partnership of 150 runs, but a late comeback from Qalandars' bowlers saw them requiring 16 runs from the last over, however their finisher Khushdil Shah's wonderful hitting in the last over helped them complete their highest successful run-chase and highest successful chase in PSL history ever, helping them win the match by 5 wickets and with two balls to spare.

The second League-stage match between the two sides was held in Lahore on 11 February. Sultans, who before this match won 6 out of their 6 matches and already qualified for the playoffs decided to give match practice to their benched players. Qalandars batted first where they scored 182 runs for the loss of 4 wickets from their full 20 overs. In response, Sultans couldn't chase down the target as Qalandars bowlers were excellent and bowled them out on 130 runs in 19.3 overs, winning the match and ending Sultans' winning streak.

29 January 2022 (D/N)
Match 3
Scorecard

Lahore Qalandars; 206/5 (20 overs)	v	Multan Sultans; 209/5 (19.4 overs)

Multan Sultans won by 5 wickets
National Stadium, Karachi

11 February 2022
Match 17
Scorecard

Lahore Qalandars; 182/4 (20 overs)	v	Multan Sultans; 130 (19.3 overs)

Lahore Qalandars won by 52 runs
Gaddafi Stadium, Lahore

=== Playoffs ===
==== Qualifier ====
Both teams faced each other for the first time in the Qualifier match and second time in the playoffs overall in PSL. Sultans, who were sent into bat by Qalandars posted 163 runs for the loss of 2 wickets. In reply, Qalandars started well, but lost their way in the middle phase of their innings and ended up losing the match by 28 runs.

23 February 2022
Match 31
Scorecard

Multan Sultans; 163/2 (20 overs)	v	Lahore Qalandars; 135/9 (20 overs)

Multan Sultans won by 28 runs
Gaddafi Stadium, Lahore

== Match ==
=== Report ===
Lahore Qalandars won the toss and elected to bat first. At the start, they put up 25 runs for three wickets in 4.2 overs, with Fakhar Zaman, Abdullah Shafique and Zeeshan Ashraf getting out early. Following which Mohammad Hafeez scored 69 runs off 46 balls to steer and anchor the Qalandars' innings. However, by the end of the 13th over, Qalandars had only managed 84 runs.

Later in the innings, Harry Brook made an unbeaten 41 runs off 22-balls while smashing 19 runs in five balls of the 17th over bowled by Rumman Raees. It was complemented by late attack from David Wiese who made another 28 runs off the eight balls he faced. Thus, Lahore Qalandars managed 180 runs for 5 wickets at the end of the innings.

In pursuit of the 181-runs target, the Multan Sultans never quite got going. Opener Mohammad Rizwan was bowled cheaply by Hafeez and his opening partner Shan Masood was run out after a mix-up. After which Hafeez removed Aamer Azmat while Rilee Rossouw was caught out at the cow corner boundary. Later, the Tim David and Khushdil Shah partnership put on 51 runs in 33 balls, but that wasn't nearly brisk enough for what the Sultans needed, before David was caught off Shaheen Afridi's ball by the boundary fielder. Afridi's yorker tore through David Willey's stumps to force the Sultans tail out, and another took Rumman Raees out in the next over. From the other end, Haris Rauf took Khushdil's wicket to end all hopes of a Sultans comeback. Wiese took the final wicket as Sultans were bowled out for 138 runs in the last over, what was their worst showing of the tournament.

Consequently, Lahore Qalandars won their maiden PSL title by defeating the defending champions' Multan Sultans by 42 runs. Hafeez was adjudged as the man of the match.

=== Scorecard ===
keys:

- † indicates team captain
- * indicates not out

Toss: Lahore Qalandars won the toss and elected to bat.

Result: Lahore Qalandars won by 42 runs

Lahore Qalandars innings
Player	Status	Runs	Balls	4s	6s	Strike rate
Fakhar Zaman	c Shahnawaz Dahani b Asif Afridi	3	6	0	0	50.00
Abdullah Shafique	st Mohammad Rizwan b Asif Afridi	14	13	2	0	107.69
Zeeshan Ashraf	c Mohammad Rizwan b David Willey	7	5	1	0	140.00
Kamran Ghulam	c Tim David b Asif Afridi	15	20	0	3	75.00
Mohammad Hafeez	c Shan Masood b Shahnawaz Dahani	69	46	9	1	150.00
Harry Brook	*	41	22	2	3	186.36
David Wiese	*	28	8	1	3	350.00
Samit Patel	did not bat					
Shaheen Afridi†	did not bat					
Haris Rauf	did not bat					
Zaman Khan	did not bat					
Extras 3 (b1, lb 1, wd 1); Total 180/5 (20 overs)				15	10	9.00 RR

Fall of wickets: 1-12 (Fakhar Zaman, 2.2 ov), 2-23 (Zeeshan Ashraf, 3.3 ov), 3-25 (Abdullah Shafique, 4.2 ov), 4-79 (Kamran Ghulam, 11.5 ov), 5-137 (Mohammad Hafeez, 17.2 ov)

Multan Sultans bowling
Bowler	Overs	Maidens	Runs	Wickets	Econ	Wides	NBs
Asif Afridi	4	0	19	3	4.75	0	0
David Willey	4	0	42	1	10.50	0	0
Rumman Raees	2	0	35	0	17.50	0	0
Khushdil Shah	3	0	26	0	8.66	1	0
Imran Tahir	4	0	22	0	5.50	0	0
Shahnawaz Dahani	3	0	34	1	11.33	0	0

Target: 181 runs from 20 overs at 9.05 RR

Multan Sultans innings
Player	Status	Runs	Balls	4s	6s	Strike rate
Shan Masood	run out (Fakhar Zaman)	19	15	1	0	126.66
Mohammad Rizwan†	b Mohammad Hafeez	14	12	3	0	116.66
Aamer Azmat	c Fakhar Zaman b Mohammad Hafeez	6	9	0	0	66.66
Rilee Rossouw	c Abdullah Shafique b Zaman Khan	15	22	1	0	68.18
Asif Afridi	b Zaman Khan	1	3	0	0	33.33
Tim David	c Fakhar Zaman b Shaheen Afridi	27	17	2	1	158.82
Khushdil Shah	b Haris Rauf	32	23	4	1	139.13
David Willey	b Shaheen Afridi	0	1	0	0	0.00
Rumman Raees	b Shaheen Afridi	6	7	1	0	85.71
Imran Tahir	c Haris Rauf b David Wiese	10	7	2	0	142.85
Shahnawaz Dahani	*	0	1	0	0	0.00
Extras 8 (lb 2, wd 6); Total 138 (19.3 overs)				14	2	7.07 RR

Fall of wickets: 1-36 (Mohammad Rizwan, 3.6 ov), 2-41 (Shan Masood, 4.6 ov), 3-46 (Aamer Azmat, 6.4 ov), 4-50 (Asif Afridi, 7.6 ov), 5-63 (Rilee Rossouw, 10.4 ov), 6-114 (Tim David, 16.1 ov), 7-120 (David Willey, 16.4 ov), 8-122 (Khushdil Shah, 17.2 ov), 9-138 (Rumman Raees, 18.5 ov), 10-138 (Imran Tahir, 19.3 ov)

Lahore Qalandars bowling
Bowler	Overs	Maidens	Runs	Wickets	Econ	Wides	NBs
Shaheen Afridi	4	0	30	3	7.50	3	0
Mohammad Hafeez	4	0	23	2	5.75	0	0
Haris Rauf	4	0	34	1	8.50	1	0
Samit Patel	2	0	7	0	3.50	0	0
Zaman Khan	4	0	26	2	6.50	2	0
David Wiese	1.3	0	16	1	10.66	0	0

== Match officials ==
Role	Name
On field Umpire	(Pakistan) Aleem Dar
On field Umpire	(England) Richard Illingworth
TV Umpire	(England) Michael Gough
Reserve Umpire	(Pakistan) Ahsan Raza
Match Referee	(Sri Lanka) Roshan Mahanama

== See also ==
- Multan Sultans in 2022
- Lahore Qalandars in 2022
