= List of Bangladesh Premier League captains =

The Bangladesh Premier League (BPL) is a professional Twenty20 cricket tournament organized by the Bangladesh Cricket Board (BCB). As of 19 February 2022, 50 players have captained their team in at least one match.

== Notable captains ==
Mashrafe Mortaza, the former captain of the Bangladesh national cricket team, has played the most matches as a captain, having led all 86 matches in which he has played. While Mosharraf Hossain, Shoaib Malik and Tom Abell are tied for the best win–loss percentage in the BPL as a captain, each with 100%, all have only captained for at most three matches. Of those who have captained for at least 10 matches, Imrul Kayes has the best win–loss percentage in the BPL, with a win–loss percentage of 71.42% from 28 matches. Mortaza leads in number of matches won as a captain with 54 wins. Of those who have captained at least 10 matches, Mosaddek Hossain has the worst win–loss percentage of 15.38% from 13 matches. Mahmudullah has lost the most matches with 42 losses.

Shakib Al Hasan, Nasir Hossain, Tamim Iqbal, Alok Kapali, Mortaza, Nafees, Mushfiqur Rahim, Mahmudullah, Misbah-ul-Haq, Kayes, Malik, Mohammad Nabi, Mehidy Hasan, Naeem Islam and Mosaddek are the only players who have captained two or more teams. Rahim has captained different teams every season and is the only captain to have led seven teams in BPL which are Duronto Rajshahi, Sylhet Royals, Sylhet Super Stars, Barisal Bulls, Rajshahi Kings, Chittagong Vikings and Khulna Tigers. Peter Trego has captained his team for the most matches without registering a win; he led his team in five matches which resulted in five losses.

Of the 50 players who have played at least one match as a captain, 22 of them are from Bangladesh. Of the 28 others, five each are from England and Sri Lanka, four each are from Australia, Pakistan and West Indies, three from New Zealand and one each from Afghanistan, South Africa and Zimbabwe.

== Key ==
Key
Symbol	Meaning
First	Year of their first BPL match as a captain
Last	Year of their latest BPL match as a captain
Match(es)	Number of matches as a captain
Team(s)	Team(s) for which the player has played as captain in at least one match
Won	Number of games won
Lost	Number of games lost
Tied	Number of games tied
NR	Number of games with no result
Win%	Percentage of games won as captain (Note: Games that did not have a result are not taken into consideration while calculating the result percentage. Ties are counted as half a win.)

== List ==
The list includes those players who have captained their team in at least one BPL match. The list is initially organised by the number of matches as a captain and if the numbers are tied, the list is sorted by sorted by their last name. (Note: To sort these tables by any statistic, click on the icon in the column title.) (Note: These statistics are correct as of the 2022 season.)

Bangladesh Premier League captains
Player	First	Last	Match(es)	Team(s)	Won	Lost	Tied	NR	Win%
Mashrafe Mortaza	2012	2023	100	Dhaka Gladiators, Comilla Victorians, Rangpur Riders, Dhaka Platoon, Sylhet Strikers	64	36	0	0	64.00
Mahmudullah	2012	2022	88	Barisal Bulls, Chittagong Kings, Khulna Titans, Chattogram Challengers, Minister Dhaka	42	42	1	0	50.00
Shakib Al Hasan	2012	2023	88	Khulna Royal Bengals, Rangpur Riders, Dhaka Dynamites, Fortune Barishal	54	32	0	0	61.36
Mushfiqur Rahim	2012	2023	86	Duronto Rajshahi; Sylhet Royals; Sylhet Super Stars; Barisal Bulls, Rajshahi Kings, Chittagong Vikings, Khulna Tigers	42	42	1	0	48.83
Imrul Kayes	2012	2023	42	Sylhet Royals; Comilla Victorians; Chattogram Challengers	31	11	0	0	73.80
Tamim Iqbal	2013	2017	34	Duronto Rajshahi; Chittagong Vikings; Comilla Victorians	14	20	0	0	41.17
Nasir Hossain	2013	2023	26	Rangpur Riders; Dhaka Dynamites; Sylhet Sixers; Dhaka Dominators	7	18	0	0	26.92
Daren Sammy	2016	2017	23	Rajshahi Kings	11	12	0	0	47.82
Brad Hodge	2012	2013	18	Barisal Burners	9	9	0	0	50.00
Mehidy Hasan	2019	2023	18	Rajshahi Kings; Chattogram Challengers; Fortune Barishal	8	10	0	0	44.44
Naeem Islam	2016	2022	14	Rangpur Riders; Chattogram Challengers	7	7	0	0	50.00
Shahriar Nafees	2012	2013	14	Barisal Burners; Khulna Royal Bengals	4	10	0	0	28.57
Mosaddek Hossain	2020	2022	13	Sylhet Thunder; Sylhet Sunrisers	2	11	0	0	15.38
Nurul Hasan	2019	2023	13	Chattogram Challengers; Rangpur Riders	9	4	0	0	69.23
Andre Russell	2019	2020	13	Rajshahi Royals	8	5	0	0	61.53
Abdur Razzak	2013	2013	11	Rangpur Riders	5	6	0	0	45.45
Shuvagata Hom	2023	2023	11	Chattogram Challengers	3	8	0	0	27.27
Kumar Sangakkara	2015	2015	10	Dhaka Dynamites	4	6	0	0	40.00
Alok Kapali	2012	2019	9	Sylhet Royals; Barisal Burners; Sylhet Sixers	5	4	0	0	55.55
Mohammad Nabi	2017	2020	8	Comilla Victorians; Rangpur Rangers	3	5	0	0	37.50
Yasir Ali	2023	2023	8	Khulna Tigers	2	6	0	0	25.00
Luke Ronchi	2017	2017	7	Chittagong Vikings	2	5	0	0	28.57
David Warner	2019	2019	7	Sylhet Sixers	2	5	0	0	28.57
Shane Watson	2019	2020	7	Rangpur Rangers	4	3	0	0	57.14
Misbah- ul-Haq	2015	2017	6	Rangpur Riders; Chittagong Vikings	1	5	0	0	16.66
Dasun Shanaka	2019	2019	6	Cumilla Warriors	2	4	0	0	33.33
Brendan Taylor	2013	2013	6	Chittagong Kings	5	1	0	0	83.33
Shoaib Malik	2017	2023	5	Comilla Victorians; Rajshahi Royals	3	2	0	0	60.00
Peter Trego	2012	2012	5	Sylhet Royals	0	5	0	0	0.00
Afif Hossain	2022	2022	4	Chattogram Challengers	3	1	0	0	75.00
Ravi Bopara	2022	2022	4	Sylhet Sunrisers	0	4	0	0	0.00
Andre Fletcher	2020	2020	4	Sylhet Thunder	0	3	1	0	12.50
Shai Hope	2023	2023	4	Khulna Tigers	1	3	0	0	25.00
Jahurul Islam	2013	2013	4	Duronto Rajshahi	1	3	0	0	25.00
Chamara Kapugedera	2013	2013	4	Duronto Rajshahi	3	1	0	0	75.00
Dawid Malan	2019	2020	4	Cumilla Warriors	2	2	0	0	50.00
Mohammad Ashraful	2012	2013	4	Dhaka Gladiators	1	3	0	0	25.00
Shahid Afridi	2015	2015	4	Sylhet Super Stars	2	2	0	0	50.00
Rayad Emrit	2019	2019	2	Chattogram Challengers	1	1	0	0	50.00
Muktar Ali	2013	2013	2	Duronto Rajshahi	0	2	0	0	0.00
Steve Smith	2019	2019	2	Comilla Victorians	1	1	0	0	50.00
Soumya Sarkar	2020	2020	2	Cumilla Warriors	0	1	1	0	25.00
Lou Vincent	2013	2013	2	Khulna Royal Bengals	1	1	0	0	50.00
Tom Abell	2019	2019	1	Rangpur Rangers	1	0	0	0	100.00
Arafat Sunny	2016	2016	1	Rangpur Riders	0	1	0	0	0.00
Liam Dawson	2016	2016	1	Rangpur Riders	0	1	0	0	0.00
Tillakaratne Dilshan	2015	2015	1	Chittagong Vikings	0	1	0	0	0.00
Faf du Plessis	2022	2022	1	Comilla Victorians	0	1	0	0	0.00
Enamul Haque	2013	2013	1	Chittagong Kings	0	1	0	0	0.00
Brendon McCullum	2017	2017	1	Rangpur Riders	0	1	0	0	0.00
Mosharraf Hossain	2013	2013	1	Dhaka Gladiators	1	0	0	0	100.00
Jehan Mubarak	2013	2013	1	Khulna Royal Bengals	0	1	0	0	0.00
Sohail Tanvir	2019	2019	1	Sylhet Sixers	0	1	0	0	0.00
Suhrawadi Shuvo	2012	2012	1	Sylhet Royals	0	1	0	0	0.00
Ziaur Rahman	2023	2023	1	Chattogram Challengers	0	1	0	0	0.00
