= List of Big Bash League captains =

Cricket captain list

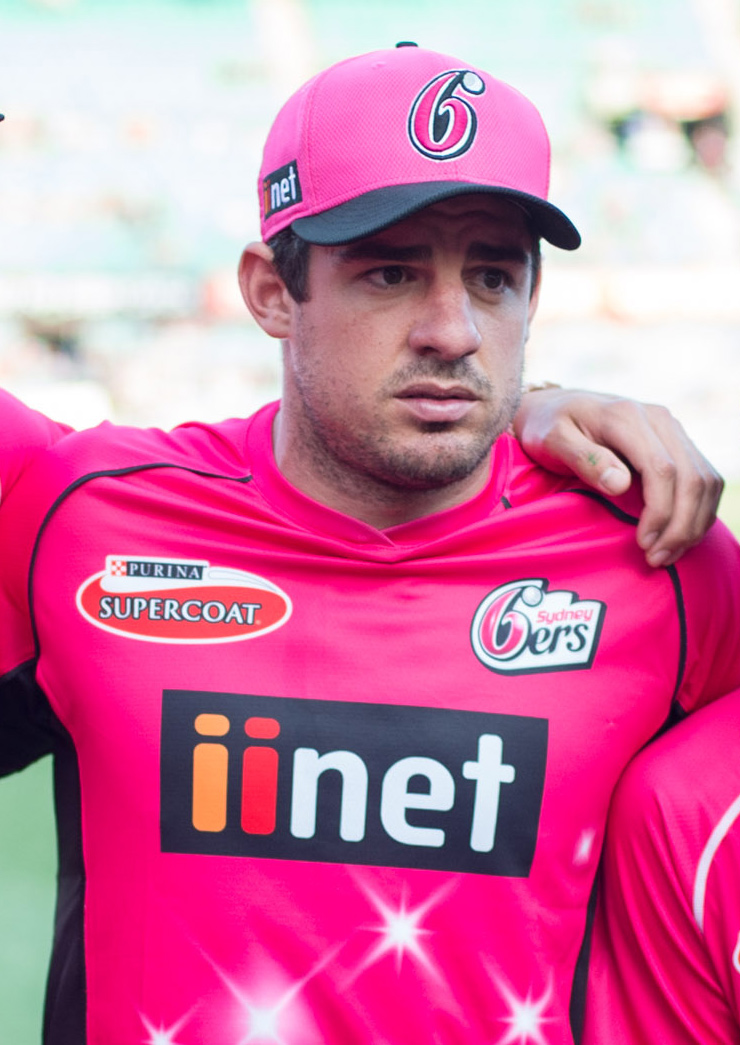
Moises Henriques is the longest serving Big Bash League captain, having first held the role in 2013.

In cricket, a captain is a player who leads the team and has additional roles and responsibilities. The Big Bash League (BBL) is a professional Twenty20 cricket league in Australia, which has been held annually since its first season in 2011–12. In the fifteen seasons played, 67 players have captained their team in at least one match.

Moises Henriques, from the Sydney Sixers, has played the most matches as a captain, leading the team in 120 matches. There have been eight non-Australian captains in the BBL: three from New Zealand, South Africa, and the West Indies each, and one from the Netherlands. Eight players have captained more than one team in their BBL career.

This list includes those players who have captained their team in at least one BBL match. It is sorted by the date each player first took over captaincy. These statistics do not cover matches played in other tournaments such as the Champions League Twenty20. Players who captained a team during the 2025–26 season are highlighted in bold.

== Key ==
Symbol	Meaning
First	Year of the first BBL match as a captain
Last	Year of latest BBL match as a captain
Mat	Number of matches as a captain
Team(s)	Team(s) for which the player has played as captain in at least one match
Won	Number of games won
Lost	Number of games lost
Tied	Number of games tied
NR	Number of games with no result
W %	Percentage of games won to those captained (Note: Games that did not have a result are not taken into consideration while calculating the result percentage. Ties are counted as half a win.)

== List of BBL captains ==
As of 11 January 2026

Big Bash League captains
Player	Nationality	First	Last	Mat	Team(s)	Won	Lost	Tied	NR	W %
James Hopes	Australia	2011	2015	24	Brisbane Heat	9	15	0	0	37.50
Brad Haddin	Australia	2011	2016	10	Sydney Sixers	5	5	0	0	50.00
Cameron White	Australia	2011	2018	32	Melbourne Stars; Melbourne Renegades	18	13	1	0	57.81
**David Warner**	Australia	2011	2026	20	Sydney Thunder	9	10	0	1	47.36
Michael Klinger	Australia	2011	2019	16	Adelaide Strikers; Perth Scorchers	8	8	0	0	50.00
Andrew McDonald	Australia	2011	2012	7	Melbourne Renegades	2	5	0	0	28.57
Xavier Doherty	Australia	2011	2012	8	Hobart Hurricanes	5	3	0	0	62.50
Marcus North	Australia	2011	2014	10	Perth Scorchers; Sydney Sixers	6	4	0	0	60.00
Steve Smith	Australia	2011	2014	11	Sydney Sixers	8	2	1	0	77.27
Peter Forrest	Australia	2011	2012	6	Brisbane Heat	3	3	0	0	50.00
Daniel Smith	Australia	2011	2012	6	Sydney Thunder	1	5	0	0	16.66
Shane Warne	Australia	2012	2013	6	Melbourne Stars	3	3	0	0	50.00
Aaron Finch	Australia	2012	2023	79	Melbourne Renegades	35	44	0	0	47.30
Chris Rogers	Australia	2012	2012	6	Sydney Thunder	0	6	0	0	0.00
George Bailey	Australia	2012	2018	29	Hobart Hurricanes	14	14	0	1	50.00
Simon Katich	Australia	2012	2014	20	Perth Scorchers	12	7	1	0	62.50
Johan Botha	South Africa	2012	2018	31	Adelaide Strikers; Sydney Sixers	16	13	0	2	55.17
Chris Gayle	West Indies	2013	2013	2	Sydney Thunder	0	2	0	0	0.00
Ben Rohrer	Australia	2013	2016	7	Melbourne Renegades; Sydney Thunder	3	4	0	0	42.85
**Moises Henriques**	Australia	2013	2026	124	Sydney Sixers	71	44	3	6	61.44
Tim Paine	Australia	2013	2017	25	Hobart Hurricanes	9	16	0	0	36.00
Chris Hartley	Australia	2013	2015	4	Brisbane Heat; Sydney Thunder	2	1	0	1	66.66
James Faulkner	Australia	2013	2013	1	Melbourne Stars	0	1	0	0	0.00
Michael Hussey	Australia	2013	2016	23	Sydney Thunder	9	14	0	0	39.13
Daniel Vettori	New Zealand	2013	2013	1	Brisbane Heat	0	1	0	0	0.00
Phillip Hughes	Australia	2014	2014	2	Adelaide Strikers	0	2	0	0	0.00
Adam Voges	Australia	2014	2018	31	Perth Scorchers	21	10	0	0	67.74
Brad Hodge	Australia	2014	2017	18	Adelaide Strikers; Melbourne Stars	11	7	0	0	61.11
Nic Maddinson	Australia	2015	2023	29	Melbourne Stars; Sydney Sixers; Melbourne Renegades	6	22	0	0	20.68
David Hussey	Australia	2015	2017	19	Melbourne Stars	10	9	0	0	52.63
Chris Lynn	Australia	2015	2022	50	Brisbane Heat	21	28	0	1	42.00
Shane Watson	Australia	2016	2019	31	Sydney Thunder	13	17	0	1	43.33
Brendon McCullum	New Zealand	2016	2018	18	Brisbane Heat	8	9	1	0	47.22
Joe Burns	Australia	2017	2017	1	Brisbane Heat	1	0	0	0	100.00
John Hastings	Australia	2017	2018	10	Melbourne Stars	2	8	0	0	20.00
Travis Head	Australia	2017	2023	28	Adelaide Strikers	17	11	0	0	60.71
Dwayne Bravo	West Indies	2018	2018	3	Melbourne Renegades	2	1	0	0	66.66
Colin Ingram	South Africa	2018	2019	14	Adelaide Strikers	5	9	0	0	35.71
Mitchell Marsh	Australia	2018	2020	20	Perth Scorchers	6	14	0	0	30.00
Tom Cooper	Netherlands	2018	2019	8	Melbourne Renegades	4	4	0	0	50.00
Glenn Maxwell	Australia	2018	2024	65	Melbourne Stars	34	30	0	1	52.30
**Ashton Turner**	Australia	2018	2026	78	Perth Scorchers	50	26	0	2	65.78
Matthew Wade	Australia	2018	2023	52	Hobart Hurricanes	24	27	0	1	46.15
Callum Ferguson	Australia	2019	2021	32	Sydney Thunder	16	14	1	1	50.00
**Ben McDermott**	Australia	2019	2026	8	Hobart Hurricanes	4	3	0	1	57.14
Alex Carey	Australia	2019	2021	16	Adelaide Strikers	7	8	0	1	43.75
Daniel Hughes	Australia	2020	2022	15	Sydney Sixers	10	5	0	0	66.66
Daniel Christian	Australia	2020	2020	5	Melbourne Renegades	2	3	0	0	40.00
Peter Handscomb	Australia	2020	2022	14	Melbourne Stars; Hobart Hurricanes	7	7	0	0	50.00
Peter Siddle	Australia	2020	2023	27	Adelaide Strikers	12	15	0	0	44.44
Shaun Marsh	Australia	2020	2020	1	Melbourne Renegades	0	1	0	0	0.00
Jimmy Peirson	Australia	2020	2023	25	Brisbane Heat	9	15	0	1	36.00
Chris Green	Australia	2021	2025	32	Sydney Thunder	13	18	0	1	40.62
Kane Richardson	Australia	2021	2022	1	Melbourne Renegades	1	1	0	1	33.33
Jason Sangha	Australia	2022	2022	6	Sydney Thunder	3	3	0	0	50.00
Adam Zampa	Australia	2022	2023	15	Melbourne Stars	4	11	0	0	26.66
**Usman Khawaja**	Australia	2022	2026	14	Sydney Thunder; Brisbane Heat	10	4	0	0	71.42
**Nathan Ellis**	Australia	2022	2026	30	Hobart Hurricanes	20	10	0	0	66.66
**Matthew Short**	Australia	2023	2026	28	Adelaide Strikers	13	15	0	0	46.42
Colin Munro	New Zealand	2023	2025	11	Brisbane Heat	7	4	0	0	63.63
**Marcus Stoinis**	Australia	2023	2026	20	Melbourne Stars	10	10	0	0	50.00
Aaron Hardie	Australia	2023	2024	8	Perth Scorchers	4	4	0	0	50.00
**Will Sutherland**	Australia	2023	2026	21	Melbourne Renegades	9	12	0	0	42.85
**Nathan McSweeney**	Australia	2024	2026	8	Brisbane Heat	4	4	0	0	50.00
Mitchell Swepson	Australia	2024	2025	2	Brisbane Heat	1	1	0	0	50.00
Alex Ross	Australia	2024	2025	3	Adelaide Strikers	1	2	0	0	33.33
**Xavier Bartlett**	Australia	2025	2025	3	Brisbane Heat	1	2	0	0	33.33
