= Rilee Rossouw =

South African cricketer (born 1989)

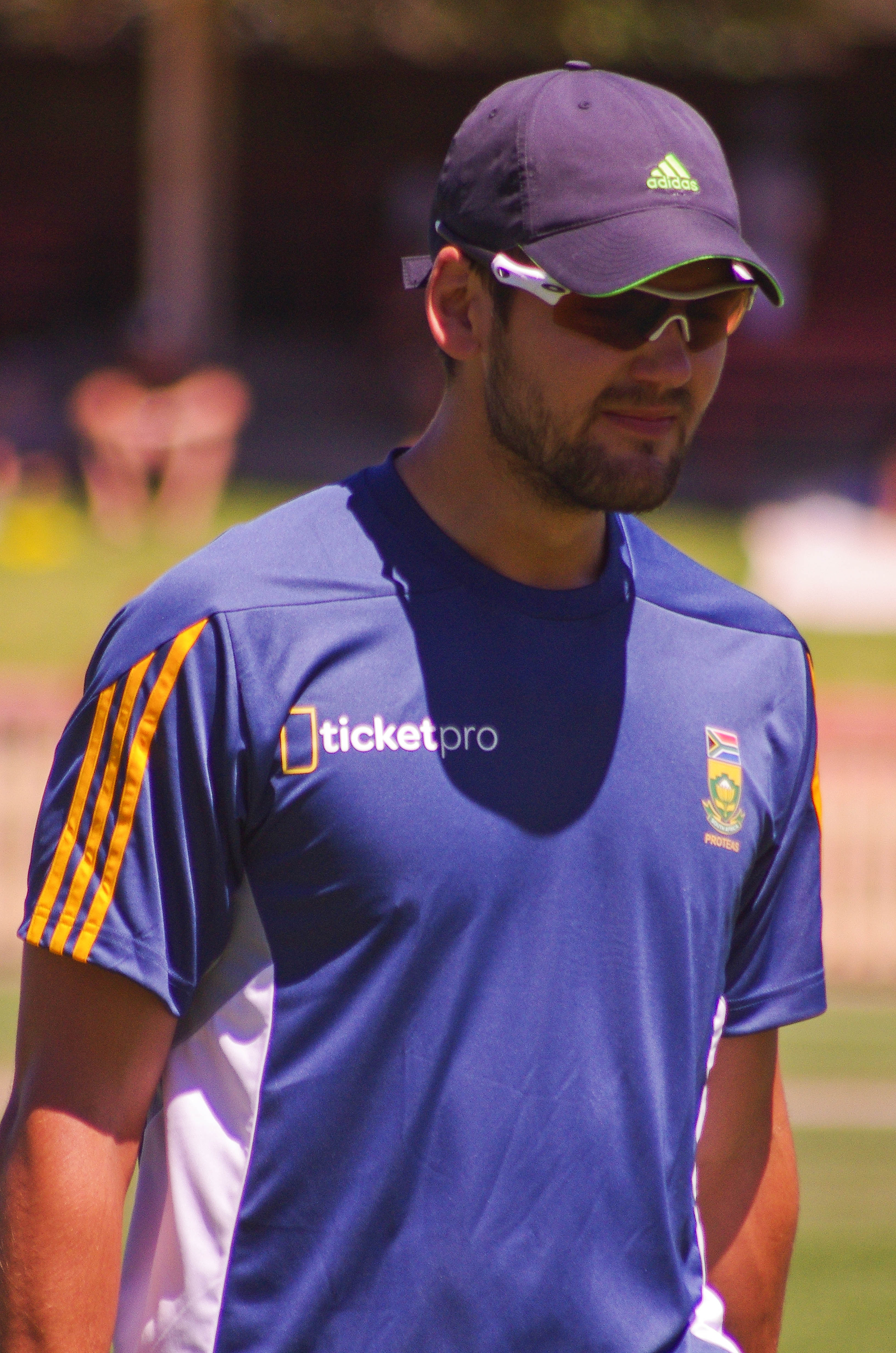
- Rossouw in 2014.

Personal information
- Full name: Rilee Roscoe Rossouw
- Born: 9 October 1989 (age 37); Bloemfontein, Orange Free State Province, South Africa
- Batting: Left-handed
- Bowling: Right-arm off break
- Role: Top-order batter

International information
- National side: South Africa (2014–2023)
- ODI debut (cap 112): 21 August 2014 v Zimbabwe
- Last ODI: 12 October 2016 v Australia
- ODI shirt no.: 27
- T20I debut (cap 63): 5 November 2014 v Australia
- Last T20I: 28 March 2023 v West Indies
- T20I shirt no.: 32 (previously 27)

Domestic team information
- Years: Team
- 2007/08–2012/13: Free State (Note: Only teams which Roussow has played for in more than one season are included in this list.)
- 2007/08–2016/17: Knights
- 2014–2015: Royal Challengers Bangalore
- 2017–2019; 2024–2026: Quetta Gladiators (squad no. 4)
- 2017–2019: Hampshire (squad no. 30)
- 2020–2023: Multan Sultans (squad no. 2)
- 2021/22–present: Free State
- 2023–present: Pretoria Capitals
- 2024–present: St Kitts & Nevis Patriots
- 2023: Delhi Capitals
- 2024: Punjab Kings

Career statistics
Competition	ODI	T20I	FC	LA
Matches	36	29	108	158
Runs scored	1,239	767	7,363	5,818
Batting average	38.71	34.86	40.90	39.84
100s/50s	3/7	2/3	19/33	12/35
Top score	132	109	319	156
Balls bowled	45	–	78	93
Wickets	1	–	3	1
Bowling average	44.00	–	23.33	87.00
5 wickets in innings	0	–	0	0
10 wickets in match	0	–	0	0
Best bowling	1/17	–	1/1	1/17
Catches/stumpings	22/–	13/–	119/–	78/–
- Source: ESPNcricinfo, 21 July 2024

Rilee Roscoe Rossouw (born 9 October 1989) is a South African international cricketer who currently plays for the Joburg Super Kings in the SA20 and the Quetta Gladiators in the Pakistan Super League. A prolific left-handed top-order batsman, Rossouw has played in major leagues globally, including the IPL for the Punjab Kings.

== Domestic cricket ==
Rossouw made his first-class debut in November 2007 for Free State against Easterns, batting at number three he topscored in the match with 83, an innings that included 13 fours. At the end of his maiden season he made the step-up to franchise cricket playing three Twenty20 matches for the Eagles.

Rossouw was a regular in the Eagles team during the 2008/09 season, in the SuperSport Series he was the team's leading scorer with 765 runs including three centuries. His maiden first-class century came against the Titans in November 2008, he made 106 including 20 boundaries. In the return fixture in March 2009 he scored 109 in a team total of 178, no other batsman passed 16. Again the innings was in vain as the Eagles lost to the league champions. In the one-day format he also scored a maiden century, he struck 131 off 108 balls against the Warriors.

Rossouw scored 1,261 runs at 57.61 in the 2009/10 season, this included a score of 319 off 291 balls against the Titans. The innings was the fastest triple century in South African domestic cricket and included 47 fours and 8 sixes. Alongside Dean Elgar he shared a second wicket partnership of 480 in 84 overs, the largest South African partnership for any wicket.

Rossouw played in the IPL 2011 for Royal Challengers Bangalore and replaced Nic Maddinson in IPL 2014 for Royal Challengers Bangalore. He was included in the Free State cricket team squad for the 2015 Africa T20 Cup.

Rossouw played in the 2017 Season of the Pakistan Super League for the Quetta Gladiators as a replacement player. Where it was reported that he earned around $370,000. He played for Quetta till 2019. In 2020 he was picked by Multan Sultans. He represented Multan Sultans for 4 years till PSL8 and now has been traded to Quetta Gladiators again, for ninth edition of Pakistan Super League.

In October 2018, he was named in the squad for the Rangpur Riders team, following the draft for the 2018–19 Bangladesh Premier League. He was the leading run-scorer for the team in the tournament, with 558 runs in 14 matches. In November 2019, he was selected to play for the Khulna Tigers in the 2019–20 Bangladesh Premier League. In July 2020, he was named in the St Lucia Zouks squad for the 2020 Caribbean Premier League. However, Rossouw was one of five South African cricketers to miss the tournament, after failing to confirm travel arrangements in due time. In November 2020, he was named in the squad for the Melbourne Renegades in the 2019–20 Big Bash League season.

In November 2021, he was selected to play for the Dambulla Giants following the players' draft for the 2021 Lanka Premier League. In April 2022, he was bought by the Oval Invincibles for the 2022 season of The Hundred in England.

In May 2022, he signed with Somerset County Cricket Club for the T20 Blast.

In late 2025, Rossouw moved from the Pretoria Capitals to the Joburg Super Kings (JSK) for the fourth season of the SA20. On 1 January 2026, he made history by hitting the winning runs in the first-ever SA20 Super Over, leading JSK to victory against Durban's Super Giants. Rossouw started the 2026 season as JSK's leading run-scorer before an injury in mid-January sidelined him for a portion of the tournament. In the 2026 PSL Draft, Rossouw was re-acquired by the Quetta Gladiators for approximately PKR 5.55 crore, continuing his long-standing association with the franchise.

== International cricket ==
While attending Grey College in Bloemfontein Rossouw was selected to represent a South African schools team. He made his debut for South Africa under-19s in the second 'Test' against Bangladesh in December 2007. He also played against India prior to the 2008 Under-19 Cricket World Cup. At the World Cup he played all six matches scoring 136 runs at an average of 34.00 as South Africa reached the final.

Rossouw was selected in the South Africa A squad for the tours of Bangladesh and Sri Lanka in 2010, on the latter he scored 131 from 151 balls against Sri Lanka A, sharing century stands with Dean Elgar and Jonathan Vandiar.

He made his One Day International debut against Zimbabwe in August 2014.

He made his Twenty20 International debut for South Africa against Australia on 5 November 2014. He was the man of the match for his score of 78 off 50 balls.

On 5 January 2017, Rossouw signed a Kolpak deal with Hampshire County Cricket Club which made him ineligible to represent South Africa anymore, ending his international career. His last act as an international cricketer before he returned was scoring a 122 at Newlands Cricket Ground where South Africa beat Australia in a 5–0 whitewash, winning the Player of the Series award.

In October 2022, he made his first T20I century against India at Indore.
