= Ben Oakley (cricketer) =

Australian cricketer (born 1982)

Personal information
- Full name: Ben Stephen Oakley
- Born: 9 May 1982 (age 44)
- Batting: Left-handed
- Bowling: Left-arm fast-medium
- Role: Bowler

Domestic team information
- Years: Team
- 2013/14: Adelaide Strikers
- Source: Cricinfo, 10 January 2021

Ben Stephen Oakley (born 9 May 1982) is an Australian cricketer. He made his Twenty20 debut on 22 December 2013, for the Adelaide Strikers, in the 2013–14 Big Bash League season.
